= 2016–17 Biathlon World Cup – Pursuit Men =

The 2016–17 Biathlon World Cup – Pursuit Men started on Sunday 4 December 2016 in Östersund and finished on Saturday 18 March 2017 in Oslo Holmenkollen. The defending titlist was Martin Fourcade of France.

The small crystal globe winner for the category was Martin Fourcade of France.

== Competition format ==
The 12.5 kilometres (7.8 mi) pursuit race is skied over five laps. The biathlete shoots four times at any shooting lane, in the order of prone, prone, standing, standing, totalling 20 targets. For each missed target a biathlete has to run a 150 metres (490 ft) penalty loop. Competitors' starts are staggered, according to the result of the previous sprint race.

== 2015–16 Top 3 standings ==
Medal	Athlete	Points
Gold:	(France) Martin Fourcade	391
Silver:	(Russia) Anton Shipulin	300
Bronze:	(Norway) Johannes Thingnes Bø	278

== Medal winners ==
Event	Gold	Time	Silver	Time	Bronze	Time
Östersund details	Anton Babikov; Russia	31:22.3 (0+0+1+0)	Maxim Tsvetkov; Russia	31:32.8 (0+0+0+0)	Martin Fourcade; France	31:37.5 (2+0+0+2)
Pokljuka details	Martin Fourcade; France	30:27.4 (0+0+0+0)	Emil Hegle Svendsen; Norway	30:33.4 (0+0+0+0)	Anton Shipulin; Russia	30:33.6 (0+0+0+1)
Nové Město details	Martin Fourcade; France	32:53.6 (0+1+0+0)	Anton Shipulin; Russia	33:23.8 (0+0+1+1)	Quentin Fillon Maillet; France	33:31.9 (0+0+0+0)
Oberhof details	Martin Fourcade; France	36:45.7 (0+1+0+0)	Arnd Peiffer; Germany	37:55.6 (0+0+1+2)	Dominik Windisch; Italy	38:18.1 (0+0+3+2)
Ruhpolding details	Martin Fourcade; France	33:57.5 (0+2+1+0)	Emil Hegle Svendsen; Norway	34:15.8 (0+0+0+0)	Michal Krčmář; Czech Republic	34:17.0 (0+0+0+0)
World Championships details	Martin Fourcade; France	30:16.9 (0+0+0+1)	Johannes Thingnes Bø; Norway	30:39.7 (1+1+1+0)	Ole Einar Bjørndalen; Norway	30:42.5 (0+0+0+1)
Pyeongchang details	Martin Fourcade; France	31:24.2 (0+0+0+0)	Anton Shipulin; Russia	31:58.7 (0+0+0+0)	Julian Eberhard; Austria	32:00.9 (0+2+0+1)
Kontiolahti details	Arnd Peiffer; Germany	30:35.0 (0+0+0+0)	Simon Eder; Austria	30:35.3 (0+0+1+1)	Emil Hegle Svendsen; Norway	30:37.3 (0+0+1+1)
Oslo Holmenkollen details	Anton Shipulin; Russia	32:11.9 (0+0+1+0)	Martin Fourcade; France	32:17.6 (1+0+0+1)	Johannes Thingnes Bø; Norway	32:33.5 (1+0+0+1)

== Standings ==
#	Name	ÖST	POK	NOV	OBE	RUH	HOC	PYE	KON	OSL	Total
1	Martin Fourcade (FRA)	48	60	60	60	60	60	60	40	54	502
2	Anton Shipulin (RUS)	34	48	54	25	43	43	54	31	60	392
3	Arnd Peiffer (GER)	43	29	15	54	40	22	20	60	15	298
4	Johannes Thingnes Bø (NOR)	31	43	40	—	26	54	—	36	48	278
5	Emil Hegle Svendsen (NOR)	25	54	DNS	43	54	DNS	—	48	25	249
6	Simon Schempp (GER)	32	40	43	21	36	31	—	—	30	233
7	Julian Eberhard (AUT)	14	20	28	22	28	34	48	DNS	38	232
8	Simon Eder (AUT)	18	25	10	DNS	—	29	43	54	36	215
9	Dominik Windisch (ITA)	16	12	16	48	30	16	19	17	26	200
10	Erik Lesser (GER)	40	30	17	40	18	13	28	—	13	199
11	Lowell Bailey (USA)	26	23	32	—	15	38	32	14	18	198
12	Benedikt Doll (GER)	8	19	26	17	19	30	34	21	23	197
13	Michal Krčmář (CZE)	36	31	31	13	48	—	0	9	28	196
14	Evgeniy Garanichev (RUS)	11	15	30	—	16	21	40	29	32	194
15	Ondřej Moravec (CZE)	23	27	0	20	4	40	—	43	34	191
16	Dominik Landertinger (AUT)	20	14	—	11	38	20	36	18	29	186
17	Ole Einar Bjørndalen (NOR)	29	32	29	4	7	48	22	12	DNS	183
18	Jean-Guillaume Béatrix (FRA)	30	2	34	26	24	28	30	—	1	175
19	Andrejs Rastorgujevs (LAT)	10	—	36	—	31	4	27	32	31	171
20	Maxim Tsvetkov (RUS)	54	34	27	31	2	—	21	DNS	—	169
21	Lukas Hofer (ITA)	1	13	11	29	3	DNS	31	38	40	166
22	Anton Babikov (RUS)	60	7	7	38	DNS	2	26	DNS	17	157
23	Simon Desthieux (FRA)	27	26	18	—	—	14	38	29	DNF	152
24	Michael Rösch (BEL)	2	38	38	27	10	10	—	19	—	144
25	Dmytro Pidruchnyi (UKR)	28	11	24	—	23	27	11	20	—	144
26	Quentin Fillon Maillet (FRA)	DNF	21	48	16	9	19	16	DNF	14	143
27	Michal Šlesingr (CZE)	19	22	22	36	—	11	17	8	7	142
28	Artem Pryma (UKR)	17	18	14	32	14	—	8	5	20	128
29	Vladimir Iliev (BUL)	—	—	19	24	29	23	DNS	11	12	118
30	Krasimir Anev (BUL)	0	16	4	—	11	36	6	25	19	117
#	Name	ÖST	POK	NOV	OBE	RUH	HOC	PYE	KON	OSL	Total
31	Henrik L'Abée-Lund (NOR)	22	—	—	34	20	—	24	—	16	116
32	Serhiy Semenov (UKR)	0	17	20	12	0	26	4	0	24	103
33	Benjamin Weger (SUI)	0	24	—	30	21	0	0	10	10	95
34	Fredrik Lindström (SWE)	3	—	2	0	22	24	—	0	43	94
35	Simon Fourcade (FRA)	38	0	—	—	25	—	25	—	6	94
36	Matvey Eliseev (RUS)	24	36	9	—	DNS	—	—	22	0	91
37	Tarjei Bø (NOR)	—	—	—	—	—	32	—	30	27	89
38	Vetle Sjåstad Christiansen (NOR)	—	—	—	14	—	—	29	34	11	88
39	Daniel Mesotitsch (AUT)	7	0	13	19	32	0	—	13	—	84
40	Lars Helge Birkeland (NOR)	13	28	6	—	5	—	—	24	—	76
41	Erlend Bjøntegaard (NOR)	4	9	25	1	34	—	—	—	—	73
42	Sebastian Samuelsson (SWE)	21	6	23	—	0	—	0	15	2	67
43	Dmitry Malyshko (RUS)	15	—	0	23	27	—	—	—	—	65
44	Serafin Wiestner (SUI)	0	0	12	—	0	15	15	—	9	51
45	Roman Rees (GER)	5	—	—	—	—	—	18	27	0	50
46	Tim Burke (USA)	6	0	—	15	17	9	—	—	—	47
47	Fabien Claude (FRA)	12	DNF	—	18	8	—	0	6	0	44
48	Christian Gow (CAN)	—	10	—	—	—	18	9	4	—	41
49	Mario Dolder (SUI)	0	8	0	0	13	12	0	7	0	40
50	Klemen Bauer (SLO)	—	0	0	—	DNF	25	3	1	3	32
51	Timofey Lapshin (KOR)	—	—	—	—	—	—	—	26	4	30
52	Sergey Bocharnikov (BLR)	—	0	—	5	0	1	23	0	0	29
53	Florian Graf (GER)	0	1	—	0	—	—	12	16	—	29
54	Vladimir Semakov (UKR)	—	—	—	28	—	—	0	0	—	28
55	Vladimir Chepelin (BLR)	0	—	8	—	12	—	5	—	—	25
56	Sean Doherty (USA)	—	—	—	—	0	0	—	23	0	23
57	Alexey Volkov (RUS)	—	—	—	—	—	—	—	—	22	22
58	Jaroslav Soukup (CZE)	—	—	21	—	—	—	—	—	0	21
59	Fredrik Gjesbakk (NOR)	—	—	—	—	—	—	—	—	21	21
60	Martin Otčenáš (SVK)	—	0	0	—	—	17	—	—	—	17
#	Name	ÖST	POK	NOV	OBE	RUH	HOC	PYE	KON	OSL	Total
61	Tomáš Krupčík (CZE)	—	3	—	—	—	—	14	—	—	17
62	Lorenz Wäger (AUT)	—	—	—	—	—	—	7	—	8	15
63	Yan Savitskiy (KAZ)	—	—	0	0	6	8	0	DNS	—	14
64	Leif Nordgren (USA)	—	—	—	—	—	0	13	0	—	13
65	Matthias Bischl (GER)	—	—	5	6	0	—	—	—	—	11
66	Yury Shopin (RUS)	—	—	—	10	—	—	0	—	—	10
67	Jeremy Finello (SUI)	—	0	—	—	—	—	10	—	—	10
68	Jesper Nelin (SWE)	9	—	—	—	0	0	—	—	—	9
69	Antonin Guigonnat (FRA)	—	—	—	9	—	—	—	—	—	9
70	Adam Václavík (CZE)	0	0	—	8	1	0	0	—	0	9
71	Olli Hiidensalo (FIN)	0	0	3	—	—	5	—	0	—	8
72	Giuseppe Montello (ITA)	—	—	—	0	—	7	0	—	—	7
73	Russell Currier (USA)	—	—	LAP	7	—	—	—	—	—	7
74	Kauri Kõiv (EST)	—	—	—	—	—	6	—	—	—	6
75	Alexandr Loginov (RUS)	—	—	—	—	—	—	—	—	5	5
75	Matthias Dorfer (GER)	—	5	—	—	—	—	—	—	—	5
77	Tomáš Hasilla (SVK)	0	4	0	—	—	0	0	—	—	4
78	Dimitar Gerdzhikov (BUL)	0	—	DNS	3	—	—	0	0	DNS	3
79	Dzmitry Abasheu (BLR)	—	—	—	—	—	—	—	3	0	3
80	Cornel Puchianu (ROU)	—	0	—	—	—	3	—	—	DNS	3
81	Anton Sinapov (BUL)	—	0	0	—	—	DNF	2	—	0	2
82	Matej Kazár (SVK)	—	—	0	2	—	—	—	—	0	2
83	Rok Tršan (SLO)	0	—	—	—	—	—	—	2	0	2
84	Scott Gow (CAN)	0	0	1	0	0	0	0	—	—	1
85	Vegard Gjermundshaug (NOR)	—	—	—	—	—	—	1	—	—	1
