= 2016–17 Biathlon World Cup – Nation Men =

== 2015–16 Top 3 standings ==
Medal	Nation	Points
Gold:	Norway	7808
Silver:	Germany	7518
Bronze:	Russia	7178

== Standings ==
#	Nation	ÖST MR	ÖST SR	ÖST IN	ÖST SP	POK SP	POK RL	NOV SP	OBE SP	RUH RL	RUH SP	ANT IN	ANT RL	HOC MR	HOC SP	HOC IN	HOC RL	PYE SP	PYE RL	KON SP	KON SR	KON MR	OSL SP	Total
1	Germany	195	180	355	417	394	360	380	404	360	408	402	420	210	421	393	330	389	290	391	180	195	374	7448
2	France	155	210	401	425	421	420	395	373	230	383	403	270	195	369	391	390	402	420	377	165	210	411	7416
3	Russia	165	125	367	392	407	390	383	381	390	378	425	360	180	343	387	420	377	330	344	90	165	393	7192
4	Norway	210	105	437	375	433	230	422	368	420	413	398	390	125	415	380	250	341	360	425	110	155	419	7181
5	Austria	105	195	367	365	359	290	359	406	270	412	332	310	115	379	382	360	437	390	400	210	80	403	6926
6	Ukraine	110	115	270	360	313	330	373	358	330	336	369	330	155	296	311	290	372	310	308	135	180	319	6270
7	Czech Republic	135	90	339	333	368	310	369	400	310	303	319	190	135	346	415	220	337	250	387	145	145	377	6223
8	Italy	180	95	300	309	247	270	286	380	220	265	223	220	165	315	309	310	372	200	325	105	135	325	5556
9	Switzerland	115	145	306	312	354	250	297	340	140	346	282	250	90	335	306	160	338	210	285	115	95	324	5395
10	United States	125	65	338	312	287	—	207	262	200	353	351	290	80	360	383	270	319	220	320	195	125	228	5290
11	Bulgaria	75	80	347	273	291	210	327	267	250	273	321	210	75	396	344	230	299	100	315	60	65	290	5098
12	Sweden	145	165	300	374	229	—	307	255	290	329	349	230	145	274	296	210	206	—	261	125	110	285	4885
13	Canada	50	135	258	289	315	220	277	243	210	233	256	160	95	328	246	190	312	270	261	65	50	162	4625
14	Belarus	90	110	329	259	271	100	304	229	160	276	225	150	50	229	324	130	326	170	256	85	105	305	4483
15	Kazakhstan	85	155	221	222	208	190	241	225	190	203	252	200	105	268	235	180	246	230	244	155	90	177	4322
16	Slovakia	60	30	331	202	283	180	285	237	180	164	196	170	100	298	269	200	206	190	187	100	115	220	4203
17	Slovenia	100	55	284	209	215	200	277	129	170	275	251	180	70	220	193	140	191	160	283	70	75	322	4069
18	Romania	45	40	290	203	202	160	182	244	110	189	159	90	60	306	198	150	205	90	200	55	40	190	3408
19	Estonia	65	85	198	156	188	170	178	197	150	116	210	140	55	264	300	110	141	140	220	80	55	175	3393
20	Finland	95	60	221	188	127	150	154	119	100	207	186	130	110	238	205	120	146	130	192	95	85	144	3202
21	Latvia	—	100	249	205	151	110	204	171	80	243	198	80	35	182	186	100	266	180	182	50	—	180	3152
22	Lithuania	55	50	186	192	178	140	172	173	90	201	168	110	40	228	238	70	177	110	201	40	70	99	2988
23	Poland	80	35	177	134	152	120	140	199	130	149	156	120	45	190	213	80	184	80	107	45	60	143	2739
24	Japan	40	75	117	88	114	130	112	161	120	50	124	100	85	189	219	170	110	150	154	35	100	143	2586
25	South Korea	70	45	82	80	44	—	52	152	70	36	46	70	65	133	123	90	80	120	142	75	45	95	1715
26	Belgium	—	—	66	100	125	—	111	105	—	107	94	—	—	131	150	—	59	—	131	—	—	63	1242
27	United Kingdom	—	70	—	15	37	—	23	—	—	11	63	—	—	42	95	60	—	—	—	—	—	76	492
28	Croatia	—	—	63	13	63	—	33	104	—	59	—	—	—	76	56	—	—	—	—	—	—	—	467
29	Serbia	—	—	—	—	—	—	—	17	—	17	13	—	—	50	54	—	—	—	—	—	—	11	162
30	Greece	—	—	—	—	—	—	—	29	—	7	11	—	—	19	37	—	—	—	43	—	—	15	161
#	Nation	ÖST MR	ÖST SR	ÖST IN	ÖST SP	POK SP	POK RL	NOV SP	OBE SP	RUH RL	RUH SP	ANT IN	ANT RL	HOC MR	HOC SP	HOC IN	HOC RL	PYE SP	PYE RL	KON SP	KON SR	KON MR	OSL SP	Total
31	Hungary	—	—	—	—	—	—	—	—	—	—	—	—	—	39	31	—	—	—	—	—	—	—	70
32	Australia	—	—	—	—	—	—	—	—	—	—	—	—	—	47	—	—	—	—	—	—	—	—	47
