= 2016–17 Biathlon World Cup – Nation Women =

== 2015–16 Top 3 standings ==
Medal	Nation	Points
Gold:	Germany	7406
Silver:	France	7176
Bronze:	Czech Republic	6944

== Standings ==
#	Nation	ÖST MR	ÖST SR	ÖST IN	ÖST SP	POK SP	POK RL	NOV SP	OBE SP	RUH RL	RUH SP	ANT IN	ANT RL	HOC MR	HOC SP	HOC IN	HOC RL	PYE SP	PYE RL	KON SP	KON SR	KON MR	OSL SP	Total
1	Germany	195	180	434	406	431	420	400	379	420	396	438	420	210	414	430	420	412	420	403	180	195	348	7951
2	France	155	210	416	415	410	390	426	423	390	404	420	390	195	416	320	360	413	290	402	165	210	426	7646
3	Ukraine	110	115	379	350	338	360	342	384	330	359	352	330	155	357	384	390	345	270	326	135	180	314	6605
4	Czech Republic	135	90	382	397	381	330	373	325	290	401	354	160	135	393	363	330	333	360	333	145	145	392	6547
5	Italy	180	95	293	335	344	200	373	363	310	378	356	360	165	403	378	310	339	310	364	105	135	385	6481
6	Norway	210	105	292	343	378	310	377	325	360	329	326	210	125	311	279	210	362	390	375	110	155	383	6265
7	Russia	165	125	394	305	359	290	379	354	190	345	379	310	180	368	304	220	297	200	378	90	165	342	6139
8	Sweden	145	165	372	337	285	250	302	348	270	362	336	270	145	325	265	290	338	330	347	125	110	317	6034
9	Belarus	90	110	341	355	337	230	287	313	250	341	328	290	50	335	379	230	362	220	343	85	105	302	5683
10	Kazakhstan	85	155	327	294	308	180	302	303	210	297	298	170	105	294	300	200	309	230	335	155	90	246	5193
11	Switzerland	115	145	287	279	317	220	268	315	180	228	246	220	90	329	304	190	342	210	299	115	95	307	5101
12	Poland	80	35	265	283	309	270	315	374	160	294	350	200	45	293	304	270	339	190	309	45	60	245	5035
13	Austria	105	195	368	347	274	170	282	167	230	284	344	230	115	293	291	—	213	160	275	210	80	321	4954
14	United States	125	65	281	299	269	—	316	180	150	242	233	190	80	325	342	180	354	180	308	195	125	304	4743
15	Finland	95	60	253	315	281	190	321	323	120	222	360	250	110	254	324	170	143	—	286	95	85	362	4619
16	Canada	50	135	248	243	282	210	316	247	220	252	314	140	95	268	300	160	313	250	229	65	50	232	4619
17	Slovakia	60	30	199	242	277	160	228	179	200	257	155	180	100	323	289	250	365	170	321	100	115	298	4498
18	Japan	40	75	286	191	143	130	294	228	170	227	198	120	85	186	231	120	233	150	197	35	100	169	3608
19	Bulgaria	75	80	179	204	153	150	187	211	130	182	183	130	75	203	231	100	129	130	157	60	65	128	3142
20	South Korea	70	45	170	100	133	110	120	204	110	114	176	110	65	269	280	140	211	140	163	75	45	201	3051
21	Slovenia	100	55	159	174	244	140	101	189	—	201	193	—	70	230	256	150	121	—	213	70	75	228	2969
22	Lithuania	55	50	162	116	139	120	157	225	100	95	157	100	40	170	156	110	183	110	192	40	70	190	2737
23	Estonia	65	85	167	191	126	100	207	160	90	116	150	90	55	109	154	130	157	120	160	80	55	125	2692
24	Romania	45	40	101	136	145	90	70	191	—	117	205	—	60	155	159	—	163	—	163	55	40	151	2086
25	China	—	—	—	—	—	—	—	190	140	140	196	150	—	231	233	—	159	—	—	—	—	145	1584
26	Latvia	—	100	105	83	96	—	76	—	—	94	99	—	35	122	107	—	85	—	79	50	—	97	1228
27	United Kingdom	—	70	45	49	79	—	66	57	—	63	29	—	—	75	109	—	—	—	—	—	—	—	642
28	Spain	—	—	23	43	69	—	—	—	—	55	67	—	—	43	59	—	—	—	41	—	—	59	459
29	Hungary	—	—	—	62	21	—	—	—	—	73	41	—	—	23	25	—	37	—	—	—	—	57	339
30	Bosnia and Herzegovina	—	—	—	—	25	—	47	—	—	—	51	—	—	21	—	—	—	—	—	—	—	—	144
#	Nation	ÖST MR	ÖST SR	ÖST IN	ÖST SP	POK SP	POK RL	NOV SP	OBE SP	RUH RL	RUH SP	ANT IN	ANT RL	HOC MR	HOC SP	HOC IN	HOC RL	PYE SP	PYE RL	KON SP	KON SR	KON MR	OSL SP	Total
31	Moldova	—	—	—	—	—	—	—	—	—	—	—	—	—	44	60	—	—	—	—	—	—	—	104
32	Greece	—	—	—	—	—	—	—	—	—	—	—	—	—	29	35	—	—	—	—	—	—	—	64
