= 2016–17 Biathlon World Cup – Mass start Women =

The 2016–17 Biathlon World Cup – Mass start Women started on Sunday 18 December 2016 in Nové Město and finished on Sunday 19 March 2017 in Oslo Holmenkollen. The defending titlist was Gabriela Koukalová of the Czech Republic.

The small crystal globe winner for the category was Gabriela Koukalová of the Czech Republic.

== Competition format ==
In the mass start, all biathletes start at the same time and the first across the finish line wins. In this 12.5 kilometres (7.8 mi) competition, the distance is skied over five laps; there are four bouts of shooting (two prone and two standing, in that order) with the first shooting bout being at the lane corresponding to the competitor's bib number (bib #10 shoots at lane #10 regardless of position in race), with the rest of the shooting bouts being on a first-come, first-served basis (if a competitor arrives at the lane in fifth place, they shoot at lane 5). As in the sprint and pursuit, competitors must ski one 150 metres (490 ft) penalty loop for each miss. Here again, to avoid unwanted congestion, World Cup Mass starts are held with only the 30 top ranking athletes on the start line (half that of the pursuit) as here all contestants start simultaneously.

== 2015–16 Top 3 standings ==
| Medal | Athlete | Points |
|---|---|---|
| Gold: | (Czech Republic) Gabriela Soukalová | 241 |
| Silver: | (France) Marie Dorin Habert | 236 |
| Bronze: | (Germany) Laura Dahlmeier | 228 |

== Medal winners ==
| Event | Gold | Time | Silver | Time | Bronze | Time |
|---|---|---|---|---|---|---|
| Nové Město details | Gabriela Koukalová; Czech Republic | 34:42.1 (0+1+0+0) | Laura Dahlmeier; Germany | 34:45.2 (2+0+0+0) | Dorothea Wierer; Italy | 34:51.8 (1+0+0+0) |
| Oberhof details | Gabriela Koukalová; Czech Republic | 37:20.5 (0+0+0+0) | Laura Dahlmeier; Germany | 37:52.0 (0+0+1+0) | Eva Puskarčíková; Czech Republic | 38:05.9 (0+0+0+0) |
| Antholz-Anterselva details | Nadine Horchler; Germany | 36:11.5 (0+0+0+0) | Laura Dahlmeier; Germany | 36:14.6 (1+0+0+2) | Gabriela Koukalová; Czech Republic | 36:19.5 (1+1+0+0) |
| World Championships details | Laura Dahlmeier; Germany | 33:13.8 (0+0+0+0) | Susan Dunklee; United States | 33:18.4 (0+0+0+0) | Kaisa Mäkäräinen; Finland | 33:33.9 (1+0+0+0) |
| Oslo Holmenkollen details | Tiril Eckhoff; Norway | 34:23.1 (0+0+1+0) | Gabriela Koukalová; Czech Republic | 34:45.7 (0+1+0+0) | Kaisa Mäkäräinen; Finland | 34:57.6 (0+0+1+1) |

== Standings ==
| # | Name | NOV | OBE | ANT | HOC | OSL | Total |
|---|---|---|---|---|---|---|---|
| 1 | Gabriela Koukalová (CZE) | 60 | 60 | 48 | 43 | 54 | 265 |
| 2 | Laura Dahlmeier (GER) | 54 | 54 | 54 | 60 | 32 | 254 |
| 3 | Kaisa Mäkäräinen (FIN) | 34 | 34 | 43 | 48 | 48 | 207 |
| 4 | Yuliia Dzhima (UKR) | 22 | 40 | 31 | 38 | 31 | 162 |
| 5 | Dorothea Wierer (ITA) | 48 | 24 | 24 | 34 | 26 | 156 |
| 6 | Marie Dorin Habert (FRA) | 36 | 27 | 40 | 36 | 8 | 147 |
| 7 | Selina Gasparin (SUI) | 28 | 36 | 22 | 23 | 30 | 139 |
| 8 | Vanessa Hinz (GER) | 43 | 20 | 34 | 21 | 14 | 132 |
| 9 | Franziska Hildebrand (GER) | 20 | 38 | 20 | 8 | 40 | 126 |
| 10 | Eva Puskarčíková (CZE) | 24 | 48 | 30 | 10 | 12 | 124 |
| 11 | Susan Dunklee (USA) | — | 32 | 14 | 54 | 21 | 121 |
| 12 | Tiril Eckhoff (NOR) | 30 | — | — | 29 | 60 | 119 |
| 13 | Anaïs Chevalier (FRA) | 27 | 16 | 23 | 28 | 24 | 118 |
| 14 | Nadezhda Skardino (BLR) | 23 | 23 | 16 | 25 | 28 | 115 |
| 15 | Justine Braisaz (FRA) | 29 | 22 | 26 | 6 | 29 | 112 |
| 16 | Marte Olsbu (NOR) | 40 | 31 | 6 | 4 | 25 | 106 |
| 17 | Tatiana Akimova (RUS) | 31 | 28 | 25 | 16 | 4 | 104 |
| 18 | Galina Vishnevskaya (KAZ) | 18 | 43 | 28 | — | 10 | 99 |
| 19 | Anna Magnusson (SWE) | 14 | 30 | 36 | — | 16 | 96 |
| 20 | Veronika Vítková (CZE) | 25 | — | 27 | — | 43 | 95 |
| 21 | Lisa Theresa Hauser (AUT) | 32 | DNF | 29 | 12 | 20 | 93 |
| 22 | Alexia Runggaldier (ITA) | — | — | 38 | 32 | 18 | 88 |
| 23 | Anaïs Bescond (FRA) | 21 | 10 | 12 | — | 36 | 79 |
| 24 | Mari Laukkanen (FIN) | 16 | — | 10 | — | 38 | 64 |
| 25 | Maren Hammerschmidt (GER) | — | 21 | 21 | — | 22 | 64 |
| 26 | Teja Gregorin (SLO) | — | — | — | 40 | 23 | 63 |
| 27 | Nadine Horchler (GER) | — | — | 60 | — | — | 60 |
| 28 | Paulína Fialková (SVK) | — | — | — | 31 | 27 | 58 |
| 29 | Darya Domracheva (BLR) | — | — | — | 22 | 34 | 56 |
| 30 | Olena Pidhrushna (UKR) | 26 | 25 | — | — | — | 51 |
| # | Name | NOV | OBE | ANT | HOC | OSL | Total |
| 31 | Federica Sanfilippo (ITA) | 12 | 8 | 4 | 20 | 6 | 50 |
| 32 | Celia Aymonier (FRA) | 6 | 14 | 2 | 24 | 2 | 48 |
| 33 | Franziska Preuß (GER) | 38 | — | — | — | — | 38 |
| 34 | Lena Häcki (SUI) | 8 | 18 | 8 | — | — | 34 |
| 35 | Kaia Wøien Nicolaisen (NOR) | — | — | 32 | — | — | 32 |
| 36 | Lisa Vittozzi (ITA) | — | — | — | 30 | — | 30 |
| 37 | Magdalena Gwizdoń (POL) | — | 29 | — | — | — | 29 |
| 38 | Monika Hojnisz (POL) | 10 | — | 18 | — | — | 28 |
| 39 | Anastasiya Merkushyna (UKR) | — | — | — | 27 | — | 27 |
| 40 | Chardine Sloof (SWE) | — | 26 | — | — | — | 26 |
| 40 | Irina Starykh (RUS) | — | — | — | 26 | — | 26 |
| 42 | Anastasiya Kuzmina (SVK) | — | — | — | 18 | — | 18 |
| 43 | Clare Egan (USA) | — | — | — | 14 | — | 14 |
| 44 | Rosanna Crawford (CAN) | — | 12 | — | — | — | 12 |
| 45 | Tang Jialin (CHN) | — | 6 | — | — | — | 6 |
| 46 | Anna Frolina (KOR) | — | 4 | — | — | — | 4 |
| 46 | Fanny Horn Birkeland (NOR) | 4 | — | — | — | — | 4 |
| 48 | Ekaterina Avvakumova (KOR) | — | — | — | 2 | — | 2 |
