= 2016–17 Biathlon World Cup – Individual Women =

The 2016–17 Biathlon World Cup – Individual Women started on Wednesday 30 November 2016 in Östersund and finished on Wednesday 15 February 2017 at the World Championships in Hochfilzen. The defending titlist was Dorothea Wierer of Italy.

The small crystal globe winner for the category was Laura Dahlmeier of Germany.

== Competition format ==
The 15 kilometres (9.3 mi) individual race is the oldest biathlon event; the distance is skied over five laps. The biathlete shoots four times at any shooting lane, in the order of prone, standing, prone, standing, totalling 20 targets. For each missed target a fixed penalty time, usually one minute, is added to the skiing time of the biathlete. Competitors' starts are staggered, normally by 30 seconds.

== 2015–16 Top 3 standings ==
Medal	Athlete	Points
Gold:	(Italy) Dorothea Wierer	154
Silver:	(France) Marie Dorin Habert	152
Bronze:	(Czech Republic) Gabriela Soukalová	128

== Medal winners ==
Event	Gold	Time	Silver	Time	Bronze	Time
Östersund details	Laura Dahlmeier; Germany	46:14.0 (0+0+1+1)	Anaïs Bescond; France	46:29.8 (0+0+0+1)	Darya Yurkevich; Belarus	47:31.3 (0+0+0+0)
Antholz-Anterselva details	Laura Dahlmeier; Germany	44:48.7 (1+1+0+0)	Anaïs Chevalier; France	44:52.5 (0+1+0+0)	Alexia Runggaldier; Italy	45:34.7 (0+1+0+0)
World Championships details	Laura Dahlmeier; Germany	41:30.1 (1+0+0+0)	Gabriela Koukalová; Czech Republic	41:54.8 (1+0+0+0)	Alexia Runggaldier; Italy	43:15.7 (0+0+0+0)

== Standings ==
#	Name	ÖST	ANT	HOC	Total
1	Laura Dahlmeier (GER)	60	60	60	180
2	Vanessa Hinz (GER)	31	38	34	103
3	Alexia Runggaldier (ITA)	0	48	48	96
4	Gabriela Koukalová (CZE)	24	17	54	95
5	Olena Pidhrushna (UKR)	28	24	31	83
6	Maren Hammerschmidt (GER)	0	40	36	76
7	Olga Podchufarova (RUS)	27	34	15	76
8	Yuliia Dzhima (UKR)	21	21	32	74
9	Mari Laukkanen (FIN)	0	30	43	73
10	Eva Puskarčíková (CZE)	26	28	18	72
11	Kaisa Mäkäräinen (FIN)	17	26	26	69
12	Lisa Theresa Hauser (AUT)	36	31	0	67
13	Marie Dorin Habert (FRA)	22	43	1	66
14	Anaïs Chevalier (FRA)	8	54	3	65
15	Justine Braisaz (FRA)	40	23	0	63
16	Franziska Hildebrand (GER)	16	32	10	58
17	Tatiana Akimova (RUS)	29	29	0	58
18	Anaïs Bescond (FRA)	54	DSQ	0	54
19	Darya Yurkevich (BLR)	48	0	6	54
20	Ekaterina Glazyrina (RUS)	38	16	—	54
21	Nadezhda Skardino (BLR)	0	25	24	49
22	Monika Hojnisz (POL)	0	36	11	47
23	Dorothea Wierer (ITA)	10	10	25	45
24	Franziska Preuß (GER)	43	—	—	43
25	Dunja Zdouc (AUT)	—	13	30	43
26	Darya Domracheva (BLR)	—	14	28	42
27	Ekaterina Avvakumova (KOR)	—	—	40	40
28	Hanna Öberg (SWE)	34	6	0	40
29	Susan Dunklee (USA)	0	0	38	38
30	Yuliya Zhuravok (UKR)	30	7	—	37
#	Name	ÖST	ANT	HOC	Total
31	Marte Olsbu (NOR)	25	12	0	37
32	Mona Brorsson (SWE)	18	19	0	37
33	Teja Gregorin (SLO)	0	5	29	34
34	Veronika Vítková (CZE)	32	0	0	32
35	Anna Magnusson (SWE)	20	11	0	31
36	Iryna Varvynets (UKR)	7	—	21	28
37	Iryna Kryuko (BLR)	0	0	27	27
38	Kaia Wøien Nicolaisen (NOR)	—	27	0	27
39	Julia Ransom (CAN)	0	0	23	23
40	Ekaterina Shumilova (RUS)	23	—	—	23
41	Zhang Yan (CHN)	—	1	22	23
42	Nadine Horchler (GER)	—	22	—	22
43	Galina Vishnevskaya (KAZ)	2	0	20	22
44	Emma Lunder (CAN)	—	20	0	20
45	Clare Egan (USA)	1	0	19	20
46	Fabienne Hartweger (AUT)	19	0	0	19
47	Krystyna Guzik (POL)	0	18	0	18
48	Emilia Yordanova (BUL)	0	0	17	17
49	Celia Aymonier (FRA)	0	0	16	16
50	Fuyuko Tachizaki (JPN)	15	0	0	15
51	Olga Poltoranina (KAZ)	—	15	0	15
52	Darya Usanova (KAZ)	14	0	—	14
53	Paulína Fialková (SVK)	—	0	14	14
54	Aita Gasparin (SUI)	0	—	13	13
55	Julia Schwaiger (AUT)	13	—	—	13
56	Joanne Reid (USA)	12	0	0	12
57	Alina Raikova (KAZ)	0	—	12	12
58	Anna Frolina (KOR)	3	2	7	12
59	Anna Kistanova (KAZ)	11	0	0	11
60	Lucie Charvátová (CZE)	0	9	0	9
#	Name	ÖST	ANT	HOC	Total
61	Svetlana Sleptsova (RUS)	9	—	0	9
62	Amanda Lightfoot (GBR)	0	0	9	9
63	Megan Tandy (CAN)	0	8	0	8
64	Anastasiya Merkushyna (UKR)	0	0	8	8
65	Sari Furuya (JPN)	6	0	0	6
66	Baiba Bendika (LAT)	5	0	0	5
67	Lisa Vittozzi (ITA)	0	0	5	5
68	Magdalena Gwizdoń (POL)	0	0	4	4
69	Lena Häcki (SUI)	4	0	0	4
70	Sanna Markkanen (FIN)	—	4	0	4
71	Chardine Sloof (SWE)	—	3	—	3
72	Tiril Eckhoff (NOR)	—	—	2	2
