= 2016–17 Biathlon World Cup – Relay Men =

The 2016–17 Biathlon World Cup – Relay Men started on Sunday 11 December 2016 in Pokljuka and finished on Sunday 5 March 2017 in Pyeongchang. The defending team was Norway.

The winning team was Russia.

== Competition format ==
The relay teams consist of four biathletes. Every athlete's leg is skied over three 2.5 kilometres (1.6 mi) laps for a total of 7.5 kilometres (4.7 mi), with two shooting rounds: one prone and one standing. For every round of five targets there are eight bullets available, though the last three can only be single-loaded manually from the spare round holders or from bullets deposited by the athlete into trays or onto the mat at the firing line. If after eight bullets there are still standing targets, one 150 metres (490 ft) penalty loop must be taken for each remaining target. The first-leg participants start all at the same time, and as in cross-country skiing relays, every athlete of a team must touch the team's next-leg participant to perform a valid changeover. On the first shooting stage of the first leg, the participant must shoot in the lane corresponding to their bib number (bib #10 shoots at lane #10 regardless of their position in the race), then for the remainder of the relay, the athletes shoot at the lane corresponding to the position they arrived (arrive at the range in 5th place, shoot at lane five).

== 2015–16 Top 3 standings ==
Medal	Nation	Points
Gold:	Norway	282
Silver:	Russia	255
Bronze:	Germany	236

== Medal winners ==
Event	Gold	Time	Silver	Time	Bronze	Time
Pokljuka details	France Jean-Guillaume Béatrix; Quentin Fillon Maillet; Simon Desthieux; Martin Fourcade	1:11:56.5 (0+1) (0+2) (0+1) (0+0) (0+0) (0+2) (0+1) (0+0)	Russia Maxim Tsvetkov; Anton Babikov; Matvey Eliseev; Anton Shipulin	1:12:12.2 (0+0) (0+0) (0+1) (0+1) (1+3) (0+0) (0+0) (0+1)	Germany Erik Lesser; Matthias Dorfer; Benedikt Doll; Simon Schempp	1:12:18.0 (0+3) (0+2) (0+0) (0+0) (0+3) (0+2) (0+1) (0+0)
Ruhpolding details	Norway Ole Einar Bjørndalen; Vetle Sjåstad Christiansen; Henrik L'Abée-Lund; Emil Hegle Svendsen	1:13:40.7 (0+1) (0+0) (0+0) (0+2) (0+0) (0+2) (0+0) (0+0)	Russia Alexey Volkov; Anton Shipulin; Matvey Eliseev; Anton Babikov	1:13:45.8 (0+0) (0+0) (0+1) (0+0) (0+0) (0+0) (0+0) (0+1)	Germany Erik Lesser; Benedikt Doll; Arnd Peiffer; Simon Schempp	1:14:04.2 (0+0) (1+3) (0+0) (0+3) (0+0) (0+2) (0+0) (0+1)
Antholz-Anterselva details	Germany Erik Lesser; Benedikt Doll; Arnd Peiffer; Simon Schempp	1:13:57.2 (0+0) (0+2) (0+2) (0+1) (0+0) (0+1) (0+0) (0+1)	Norway Lars Helge Birkeland; Henrik L'Abée-Lund; Johannes Thingnes Bø; Emil Hegle Svendsen	1:13:57.3 (0+1) (0+1) (0+1) (0+3) (0+1) (0+0) (0+0) (0+2)	Russia Maxim Tsvetkov; Evgeniy Garanichev; Dmitry Malyshko; Anton Babikov	1:14:30.8 (0+0) (0+0) (0+3) (0+0) (0+2) (0+2) (0+0) (0+2)
World Championships details	Russia Alexey Volkov; Maxim Tsvetkov; Anton Babikov; Anton Shipulin	1:14:15.0 (0+1) (0+1) (0+0) (0+0) (0+0) (0+0) (0+0) (0+1)	France Jean-Guillaume Béatrix; Quentin Fillon Maillet; Simon Desthieux; Martin Fourcade	1:14:20.8 (0+0) (0+0) (0+1) (0+0) (0+3) (0+0) (0+0) (0+0)	Austria Daniel Mesotitsch; Julian Eberhard; Simon Eder; Dominik Landertinger	1:14:35.1 (0+0) (0+1) (0+2) (0+2) (0+1) (0+2) (0+1) (0+1)
Pyeongchang details	France Jean-Guillaume Béatrix; Simon Fourcade; Simon Desthieux; Martin Fourcade	1:12:09.5 (0+1) (0+2) (0+1) (0+0) (0+1) (0+1) (0+2) (0+2)	Austria Lorenz Wäger; Simon Eder; Julian Eberhard; Dominik Landertinger	1:12:43.3 (0+0) (0+1) (0+1) (0+1) (0+2) (0+0) (0+2) (0+2)	Norway Vetle Sjåstad Christiansen; Ole Einar Bjørndalen; Vegard Gjermundshaug; Henrik L'Abée-Lund	1:12:54.9 (0+0) (0+0) (0+2) (0+1) (0+0) (1+3) (0+0) (0+2)

== Standings ==
#	Nation	POK	RUH	ANT	HOC	PYE	Total
1	Russia	54	54	48	60	43	259
2	France	60	32	36	54	60	242
3	Germany	48	48	60	43	38	237
4	Norway	32	60	54	34	48	228
5	Austria	38	36	40	48	54	216
6	Ukraine	43	43	43	38	40	207
7	Czech Republic	40	40	28	31	34	173
8	Italy	36	31	31	40	29	167
9	Canada	31	30	25	28	36	150
10	Switzerland	34	23	34	25	30	146
11	Bulgaria	30	34	30	32	19	145
12	Kazakhstan	28	28	29	27	32	144
13	Slovakia	27	27	26	29	28	137
14	United States	—	29	38	36	31	134
15	Slovenia	29	26	27	23	25	130
16	Belarus	19	25	24	22	26	116
17	Estonia	26	24	23	20	23	116
18	Japan	22	21	19	26	24	112
19	Finland	24	19	22	21	22	108
20	Romania	25	20	18	24	18	105
21	Sweden	0	38	32	30	0	100
22	Latvia	20	17	17	19	27	100
23	Poland	21	22	21	17	17	98
24	Lithuania	23	18	20	16	20	97
25	South Korea	0	16	16	18	21	71
26	United Kingdom	—	—	—	15	—	15
