= 2016–17 Biathlon World Cup – Relay Women =

The 2016–17 Biathlon World Cup – Relay Women started on Sunday 11 December 2016 in Pokljuka and finished on Sunday 5 March 2017 in Pyeongchang. The defending team was Germany.

The winning team was Germany.

== Competition format ==
The relay teams consist of four biathletes. Every athlete's leg is skied over three 2 kilometres (1.2 mi) laps for a total of 6 kilometres (3.7 mi), with two shooting rounds: one prone and one standing. For every round of five targets there are eight bullets available, though the last three can only be single-loaded manually from the spare round holders or from bullets deposited by the athlete into trays or onto the mat at the firing line. If after eight bullets there are still standing targets, one 150 metres (490 ft) penalty loop must be taken for each remaining target. The first-leg participants start all at the same time, and as in cross-country skiing relays, every athlete of a team must touch the team's next-leg participant to perform a valid changeover. On the first shooting stage of the first leg, the participant must shoot in the lane corresponding to their bib number (bib #10 shoots at lane #10 regardless of their position in the race), then for the remainder of the relay, the athletes shoot at the lane corresponding to the position they arrived (arrive at the range in 5th place, shoot at lane five).

== 2015–16 Top 3 standings ==
| Medal | Nation | Points |
|---|---|---|
| Gold: | Germany | 235 |
| Silver: | Ukraine | 234 |
| Bronze: | Czech Republic | 228 |

== Medal winners ==
| Event | Gold | Time | Silver | Time | Bronze | Time |
|---|---|---|---|---|---|---|
| Pokljuka details | Germany Vanessa Hinz; Franziska Hildebrand; Maren Hammerschmidt; Laura Dahlmeier | 1:11:31.1 (0+1) (0+2) (0+0) (0+3) (0+0) (0+2) (0+1) (0+0) | France Anaïs Chevalier; Justine Braisaz; Celia Aymonier; Marie Dorin Habert | 1:11:41.2 (0+0) (0+1) (0+1) (0+0) (0+1) (0+0) (0+0) (0+0) | Ukraine Iryna Varvynets; Yuliia Dzhima; Olena Pidhrushna; Anastasiya Merkushyna | 1:12:08.8 (0+0) (0+0) (0+0) (0+1) (0+2) (0+0) (0+0) (0+0) |
| Ruhpolding details | Germany Vanessa Hinz; Maren Hammerschmidt; Franziska Preuß; Laura Dahlmeier | 1:09:53.0 (0+0) (0+1) (0+1) (0+1) (0+0) (0+2) (0+0) (0+1) | France Anaïs Chevalier; Justine Braisaz; Anaïs Bescond; Celia Aymonier | 1:09:56.5 (0+1) (0+0) (0+0) (0+3) (0+1) (0+2) (0+0) (0+0) | Norway Kaia Wøien Nicolaisen; Hilde Fenne; Tiril Eckhoff; Marte Olsbu | 1:09:57.5 (0+0) (0+0) (0+0) (0+0) (0+1) (0+0) (0+0) (0+0) |
| Antholz-Anterselva details | Germany Vanessa Hinz; Maren Hammerschmidt; Franziska Hildebrand; Laura Dahlmeier | 1:09:12.4 (0+1) (0+1) (0+0) (0+1) (0+3) (0+1) (0+2) (0+3) | France Anaïs Chevalier; Justine Braisaz; Anaïs Bescond; Marie Dorin Habert | 1:09:36.6 (0+1) (0+1) (0+3) (0+0) (0+0) (0+1) (0+0) (0+2) | Italy Lisa Vittozzi; Federica Sanfilippo; Alexia Runggaldier; Dorothea Wierer | 1:09:45.8 (0+1) (0+1) (0+1) (0+2) (0+0) (0+3) (0+0) (0+1) |
| World Championships details | Germany Vanessa Hinz; Maren Hammerschmidt; Franziska Hildebrand; Laura Dahlmeier | 1:11:16.6 (0+0) (0+2) (0+1) (0+3) (0+0) (0+0) (0+1) (0+2) | Ukraine Iryna Varvynets; Yuliia Dzhima; Anastasiya Merkushyna; Olena Pidhrushna | 1:11:23.0 (0+0) (0+1) (0+1) (0+1) (0+1) (0+0) (0+0) (0+0) | France Anaïs Chevalier; Celia Aymonier; Justine Braisaz; Marie Dorin Habert | 1:11:24.7 (0+0) (0+1) (0+0) (0+3) (0+3) (0+0) (0+0) (0+0) |
| Pyeongchang details | Germany Nadine Horchler; Maren Hammerschmidt; Denise Herrmann; Franziska Hildebrand | 1:07:35.6 (0+0) (0+1) (0+1) (0+1) (0+0) (1+3) (0+1) (0+0) | Norway Kaia Wøien Nicolaisen; Hilde Fenne; Tiril Eckhoff; Marte Olsbu | 1:07:58.4 (0+1) (0+0) (0+1) (1+3) (0+2) (0+1) (0+2) (0+1) | Czech Republic Jessica Jislová; Eva Puskarčíková; Lucie Charvátová; Gabriela Koukalová | 1:07:58.5 (0+2) (0+2) (0+0) (0+0) (0+1) (1+3) (0+0) (0+1) |

== Standings ==
| # | Nation | POK | RUH | ANT | HOC | PYE | Total |
|---|---|---|---|---|---|---|---|
| 1 | Germany | 60 | 60 | 60 | 60 | 60 | 300 |
| 2 | France | 54 | 54 | 54 | 48 | 38 | 248 |
| 3 | Ukraine | 48 | 43 | 43 | 54 | 36 | 224 |
| 4 | Norway | 40 | 48 | 30 | 30 | 54 | 202 |
| 5 | Czech Republic | 43 | 38 | 25 | 43 | 48 | 197 |
| 6 | Italy | 29 | 40 | 48 | 40 | 40 | 197 |
| 7 | Sweden | 34 | 36 | 36 | 38 | 43 | 187 |
| 8 | Belarus | 32 | 34 | 38 | 32 | 31 | 167 |
| 9 | Russia | 38 | 28 | 40 | 31 | 29 | 166 |
| 10 | Poland | 36 | 25 | 29 | 36 | 28 | 154 |
| 11 | Switzerland | 31 | 27 | 31 | 28 | 30 | 147 |
| 12 | Kazakhstan | 27 | 30 | 26 | 29 | 32 | 144 |
| 13 | Canada | 30 | 31 | 23 | 25 | 34 | 143 |
| 14 | Slovakia | 25 | 29 | 27 | 34 | 26 | 141 |
| 15 | Austria | 26 | 32 | 32 | 0 | 25 | 115 |
| 16 | Japan | 22 | 26 | 21 | 21 | 24 | 114 |
| 17 | Finland | 28 | 21 | 34 | 26 | — | 109 |
| 18 | Bulgaria | 24 | 22 | 22 | 19 | 22 | 109 |
| 19 | United States | — | 24 | 28 | 27 | 27 | 106 |
| 20 | South Korea | 20 | 20 | 20 | 23 | 23 | 106 |
| 21 | Lithuania | 21 | 19 | 19 | 20 | 20 | 99 |
| 22 | Estonia | 19 | 18 | 18 | 22 | 21 | 98 |
| 23 | China | — | 23 | 24 | — | — | 47 |
| 23 | Slovenia | 23 | — | — | 24 | — | 47 |
| 25 | Romania | 18 | — | — | — | — | 18 |
