= 2016–17 Biathlon World Cup – mass start men =

The 2016–17 Biathlon World Cup – mass start men started on Sunday 18 December 2016 in Nové Město and finished on Sunday 19 March 2017 in Oslo Holmenkollen. The defending titlist was Martin Fourcade of France.

The small crystal globe winner for the category was Martin Fourcade of France.

== Competition format ==
In the mass start, all biathletes start at the same time and the first across the finish line wins. In this 15 kilometres (9.3 mi) competition, the distance is skied over five laps; there are four bouts of shooting (two prone and two standing, in that order) with the first shooting bout being at the lane corresponding to the competitor's bib number (bib #10 shoots at lane #10 regardless of position in race), with the rest of the shooting bouts being on a first-come, first-served basis (if a competitor arrives at the lane in fifth place, they shoot at lane 5). As in the sprint and pursuit, competitors must ski one 150 metres (490 ft) penalty loop for each miss. Here again, to avoid unwanted congestion, World Cup Mass starts are held with only the 30 top ranking athletes on the start line (half that of the pursuit) as here all contestants start simultaneously.

== 2015–16 top 3 standings ==
| Medal | Athlete | Points |
|---|---|---|
| Gold: | (France) Martin Fourcade | 242 |
| Silver: | (France) Quentin Fillon Maillet | 162 |
| Bronze: | (Russia) Anton Shipulin | 155 |

== Medal winners ==
| Event | Gold | Time | Silver | Time | Bronze | Time |
|---|---|---|---|---|---|---|
| Nové Město details | Martin Fourcade; France | 36:18.9 (0+1+0+0) | Simon Schempp; Germany | 36:27.2 (1+1+0+0) | Anton Babikov; Russia | 36:28.3 (0+0+0+1) |
| Oberhof details | Simon Schempp; Germany | 38:30.9 (0+0+1+0) | Erik Lesser; Germany | 38:31.3 (0+0+0+1) | Martin Fourcade; France | 38:31.3 (0+0+2+0) |
| Antholz-Anterselva details | Johannes Thingnes Bø; Norway | 37:04.3 (0+0+0+0) | Quentin Fillon Maillet; France | 37:08.0 (1+0+0+0) | Anton Shipulin; Russia | 37:26.0 (0+1+0+0) |
| World Championships details | Simon Schempp; Germany | 35:38.3 (0+0+0+0) | Johannes Thingnes Bø; Norway | 35:47.3 (0+0+0+1) | Simon Eder; Austria | 35:48.4 (0+0+0+0) |
| Oslo Holmenkollen details | Martin Fourcade; France | 37:32.2 (0+0+0+0) | Andrejs Rastorgujevs; Latvia | 37:49.6 (0+1+1+0) | Simon Eder; Austria | 38:04.6 (0+0+1+0) |

== Standings ==
| # | Name | NOV | OBE | ANT | HOC | OSL | Total |
|---|---|---|---|---|---|---|---|
| 1 | Martin Fourcade (FRA) | 60 | 48 | 40 | 40 | 60 | 248 |
| 2 | Simon Schempp (GER) | 54 | 60 | 36 | 60 | 21 | 231 |
| 3 | Anton Shipulin (RUS) | 29 | 27 | 48 | 43 | 30 | 177 |
| 4 | Jean-Guillaume Béatrix (FRA) | 28 | 43 | 38 | 23 | 36 | 168 |
| 5 | Erik Lesser (GER) | 30 | 54 | 34 | 20 | 27 | 165 |
| 6 | Johannes Thingnes Bø (NOR) | 32 | — | 60 | 54 | 4 | 150 |
| 7 | Ole Einar Bjørndalen (NOR) | 36 | 40 | 31 | 16 | 24 | 147 |
| 8 | Arnd Peiffer (GER) | 27 | 23 | 20 | 31 | 40 | 141 |
| 9 | Anton Babikov (RUS) | 48 | 34 | 27 | — | 31 | 140 |
| 10 | Benedikt Doll (GER) | 14 | 38 | 22 | 32 | 28 | 134 |
| 11 | Quentin Fillon Maillet (FRA) | 34 | DNF | 54 | 26 | 18 | 132 |
| 12 | Emil Hegle Svendsen (NOR) | — | 36 | 43 | 6 | 43 | 128 |
| 13 | Ondřej Moravec (CZE) | 43 | 28 | 16 | 25 | 14 | 126 |
| 14 | Simon Eder (AUT) | 16 | — | — | 48 | 48 | 112 |
| 15 | Michal Krčmář (CZE) | 22 | 32 | 6 | 18 | 32 | 110 |
| 16 | Lowell Bailey (USA) | 20 | — | 25 | 38 | 26 | 109 |
| 17 | Julian Eberhard (AUT) | 23 | 18 | 32 | 22 | 10 | 105 |
| 18 | Dominik Windisch (ITA) | 25 | 6 | 29 | 14 | 22 | 96 |
| 19 | Maxim Tsvetkov (RUS) | 18 | 30 | 28 | 10 | 6 | 92 |
| 20 | Serhiy Semenov (UKR) | 24 | 16 | 23 | 8 | 20 | 91 |
| 21 | Dominik Landertinger (AUT) | — | 29 | — | 36 | 25 | 90 |
| 22 | Evgeniy Garanichev (RUS) | — | — | 26 | 30 | 34 | 90 |
| 23 | Michal Šlesingr (CZE) | 2 | 4 | 14 | 28 | 38 | 86 |
| 24 | Fredrik Lindström (SWE) | — | — | 24 | 34 | 23 | 81 |
| 25 | Dmytro Pidruchnyi (UKR) | 40 | 8 | 18 | 12 | — | 78 |
| 26 | Andrejs Rastorgujevs (LAT) | 12 | — | 10 | — | 54 | 76 |
| 27 | Simon Desthieux (FRA) | 31 | 10 | 21 | — | 12 | 74 |
| 28 | Matvey Eliseev (RUS) | 38 | 26 | — | — | — | 64 |
| 29 | Lars Helge Birkeland (NOR) | 26 | — | 30 | — | — | 56 |
| 30 | Tarjei Bø (NOR) | — | — | — | 27 | 29 | 56 |
| # | Name | NOV | OBE | ANT | HOC | OSL | Total |
| 31 | Vladimir Iliev (BUL) | 6 | 20 | — | 21 | — | 47 |
| 32 | Benjamin Weger (SUI) | — | 31 | 8 | — | — | 39 |
| 33 | Krasimir Anev (BUL) | — | — | — | 29 | 8 | 37 |
| 34 | Michael Rösch (BEL) | 10 | 22 | — | — | — | 32 |
| 35 | Lukas Hofer (ITA) | — | 25 | — | — | 2 | 27 |
| 36 | Dmitry Malyshko (RUS) | — | 24 | — | — | — | 24 |
| 36 | Klemen Bauer (SLO) | — | — | — | 24 | — | 24 |
| 38 | Vladimir Semakov (UKR) | — | 12 | 12 | — | — | 24 |
| 39 | Erlend Bjøntegaard (NOR) | 21 | — | — | — | — | 21 |
| 39 | Henrik L'Abée-Lund (NOR) | — | 21 | — | — | — | 21 |
| 41 | Fredrik Gjesbakk (NOR) | — | — | — | — | 16 | 16 |
| 42 | Daniel Mesotitsch (AUT) | — | 14 | — | — | — | 14 |
| 43 | Jaroslav Soukup (CZE) | 8 | — | — | — | — | 8 |
| 44 | Lorenz Wäger (AUT) | — | — | 4 | — | — | 4 |
| 44 | Sebastian Samuelsson (SWE) | 4 | — | — | — | — | 4 |
| 44 | Serafin Wiestner (SUI) | — | — | — | 4 | — | 4 |
| 47 | Mario Dolder (SUI) | — | — | — | 2 | — | 2 |
| 47 | Scott Gow (CAN) | — | — | 2 | — | — | 2 |
