= 2016–17 Biathlon World Cup =

Biathlon competition

Discipline	Men	Women
Overall	(France) Martin Fourcade	(Germany) Laura Dahlmeier
Nations Cup	Germany	Germany
Individual	(France) Martin Fourcade	(Germany) Laura Dahlmeier
Sprint	(France) Martin Fourcade	(Czech Republic) Gabriela Koukalová
Pursuit	(France) Martin Fourcade	(Germany) Laura Dahlmeier
Mass start	(France) Martin Fourcade	(Czech Republic) Gabriela Koukalová
Relay	Russia	Germany
- Mixed: Germany

Competition

The 2016–17 Biathlon World Cup (BWC) was a multi-race tournament over a season of biathlon, organised by the International Biathlon Union. The season started on 27 November 2016 in Östersund, Sweden and ended on 19 March 2017 in Holmenkollen, Norway. The defending overall champions from the 2015–16 Biathlon World Cup were Martin Fourcade of France and Gabriela Koukalová of the Czech Republic.

== Calendar ==
Below is the IBU World Cup calendar for the 2016–17 season.

Stage	Location	Date	Individual	Sprint	Pursuit	Mass start	Relay	Mixed relay	Single mixed relay	Details
1	(Sweden) Östersund	27 November–4 December	●	●	●			●	●	details
2	(Slovenia) Pokljuka	9–11 December		●	●		●			details
3	(Czech Republic) Nové Město	15–18 December		●	●	●				details
4	(Germany) Oberhof	5–8 January		●	●	●				details
5	(Germany) Ruhpolding	11–15 January		●	●		●			details
6	(Italy) Antholz-Anterselva	19–22 January	●			●	●			details
WC	(Austria) Hochfilzen	9–19 February	●	●	●	●	●	●		World Championships
7	(South Korea) Pyeongchang	2–5 March		●	●		●			details
8	(Finland) Kontiolahti (Note: Event was relocated from Tyumen, Russia.)	10–12 March		●	●			●	●	details
9	(Norway) Oslo Holmenkollen	17–19 March		●	●	●				details
Total: 67 (31 men's, 31 women's, 5 mixed)			3	9	9	5	5	3	2	

== World Cup podiums ==
=== Men ===
Stage	Date	Place	Discipline	Winner	Second	Third	Yellow bib (After competition)	Det.
1	1 December 2016	(Sweden) Östersund	20 km Individual	(France) Martin Fourcade	(Norway) Johannes Thingnes Bø	(Belarus) Vladimir Chepelin	(France) Martin Fourcade	Detail
1	3 December 2016	(Sweden) Östersund	10 km Sprint	(France) Martin Fourcade	(Sweden) Fredrik Lindström	(Germany) Arnd Peiffer	(France) Martin Fourcade	Detail
1	4 December 2016	(Sweden) Östersund	12.5 km Pursuit	(Russia) Anton Babikov	(Russia) Maxim Tsvetkov	(France) Martin Fourcade	(France) Martin Fourcade	Detail
2	9 December 2016	(Slovenia) Pokljuka	10 km Sprint	(France) Martin Fourcade	(Norway) Johannes Thingnes Bø	(Russia) Anton Shipulin	(France) Martin Fourcade	Detail
2	10 December 2016	(Slovenia) Pokljuka	12.5 km Pursuit	(France) Martin Fourcade	(Norway) Emil Hegle Svendsen	(Russia) Anton Shipulin	(France) Martin Fourcade	Detail
3	15 December 2016	(Czech Republic) Nové Město	10 km Sprint	(France) Martin Fourcade	(Russia) Anton Shipulin	(Norway) Emil Hegle Svendsen	(France) Martin Fourcade	Detail
3	17 December 2016	(Czech Republic) Nové Město	12.5 km Pursuit	(France) Martin Fourcade	(Russia) Anton Shipulin	(France) Quentin Fillon Maillet	(France) Martin Fourcade	Detail
3	18 December 2016	(Czech Republic) Nové Město	15 km Mass Start	(France) Martin Fourcade	(Germany) Simon Schempp	(Russia) Anton Babikov	(France) Martin Fourcade	Detail
4	5 January 2017	(Germany) Oberhof	10 km Sprint	(Austria) Julian Eberhard	(Czech Republic) Michal Šlesingr	(Italy) Dominik Windisch	(France) Martin Fourcade	Detail
4	7 January 2017	(Germany) Oberhof	12.5 km Pursuit	(France) Martin Fourcade	(Germany) Arnd Peiffer	(Italy) Dominik Windisch	(France) Martin Fourcade	Detail
4	8 January 2017	(Germany) Oberhof	15 km Mass Start	(Germany) Simon Schempp	(Germany) Erik Lesser	(France) Martin Fourcade	(France) Martin Fourcade	Detail
5	13 January 2017	(Germany) Ruhpolding	10 km Sprint	(France) Martin Fourcade	(Austria) Julian Eberhard	(Norway) Emil Hegle Svendsen	(France) Martin Fourcade	Detail
5	15 January 2017	(Germany) Ruhpolding	12.5 km Pursuit	(France) Martin Fourcade	(Norway) Emil Hegle Svendsen	(Czech Republic) Michal Krčmář	(France) Martin Fourcade	Detail
6	20 January 2017	(Italy) Antholz-Anterselva	20 km Individual	(Russia) Anton Shipulin	(France) Martin Fourcade	(Ukraine) Serhiy Semenov	(France) Martin Fourcade	Detail
6	22 January 2017	(Italy) Antholz-Anterselva	15 km Mass Start	(Norway) Johannes Thingnes Bø	(France) Quentin Fillon Maillet	(Russia) Anton Shipulin	(France) Martin Fourcade	Detail
WC	11 February 2017	(Austria) Hochfilzen	10 km Sprint	(Germany) Benedikt Doll	(Norway) Johannes Thingnes Bø	(France) Martin Fourcade	(France) Martin Fourcade	Detail
WC	12 February 2017	(Austria) Hochfilzen	12.5 km Pursuit	(France) Martin Fourcade	(Norway) Johannes Thingnes Bø	(Norway) Ole Einar Bjørndalen	(France) Martin Fourcade	Detail
WC	16 February 2017	(Austria) Hochfilzen	20 km Individual	(United States) Lowell Bailey	(Czech Republic) Ondřej Moravec	(France) Martin Fourcade	(France) Martin Fourcade	Detail
WC	19 February 2017	(Austria) Hochfilzen	15 km Mass Start	(Germany) Simon Schempp	(Norway) Johannes Thingnes Bø	(Austria) Simon Eder	(France) Martin Fourcade	Detail
7	3 March 2017	(South Korea) Pyeongchang	10 km Sprint	(Austria) Julian Eberhard	(United States) Lowell Bailey	(France) Martin Fourcade	(France) Martin Fourcade	Detail
7	4 March 2017	(South Korea) Pyeongchang	12.5 km Pursuit	(France) Martin Fourcade	(Russia) Anton Shipulin	(Austria) Julian Eberhard	(France) Martin Fourcade	Detail
8	10 March 2017	(Finland) Kontiolahti	10 km Sprint	(France) Martin Fourcade	(Czech Republic) Ondřej Moravec	(Norway) Emil Hegle Svendsen	(France) Martin Fourcade	Detail
8	11 March 2017	(Finland) Kontiolahti	12.5 km Pursuit	(Germany) Arnd Peiffer	(Austria) Simon Eder	(Norway) Emil Hegle Svendsen	(France) Martin Fourcade	Detail
9	17 March 2017	(Norway) Oslo Holmenkollen	10 km Sprint	(Norway) Johannes Thingnes Bø	(France) Martin Fourcade	(Russia) Anton Shipulin	(France) Martin Fourcade	Detail
9	18 March 2017	(Norway) Oslo Holmenkollen	12.5 km Pursuit	(Russia) Anton Shipulin	(France) Martin Fourcade	(Norway) Johannes Thingnes Bø	(France) Martin Fourcade	Detail
9	19 March 2017	(Norway) Oslo Holmenkollen	15 km Mass Start	(France) Martin Fourcade	(Latvia) Andrejs Rastorgujevs	(Austria) Simon Eder	(France) Martin Fourcade	Detail

=== Women ===
Stage	Date	Place	Discipline	Winner	Second	Third	Yellow bib (After competition)	Det.
1	30 November 2016	(Sweden) Östersund	15 km Individual	(Germany) Laura Dahlmeier	(France) Anaïs Bescond	(Belarus) Darya Yurkevich	(Germany) Laura Dahlmeier	Detail
1	3 December 2016	(Sweden) Östersund	7.5 km Sprint	(France) Marie Dorin Habert	(Finland) Kaisa Mäkäräinen	(Czech Republic) Gabriela Koukalová	(Germany) Laura Dahlmeier	Detail
1	4 December 2016	(Sweden) Östersund	10 km Pursuit	(Czech Republic) Gabriela Koukalová	(Germany) Laura Dahlmeier	(Italy) Dorothea Wierer	(Germany) Laura Dahlmeier	Detail
2	9 December 2016	(Slovenia) Pokljuka	7.5 km Sprint	(Germany) Laura Dahlmeier	(France) Justine Braisaz	(Norway) Marte Olsbu	(Germany) Laura Dahlmeier	Detail
2	10 December 2016	(Slovenia) Pokljuka	10 km Pursuit	(Germany) Laura Dahlmeier	(Finland) Kaisa Mäkäräinen	(Czech Republic) Eva Puskarčíková	(Germany) Laura Dahlmeier	Detail
3	16 December 2016	(Czech Republic) Nové Město	7.5 km Sprint	(Russia) Tatiana Akimova	(France) Anaïs Chevalier	(United States) Susan Dunklee	(Germany) Laura Dahlmeier	Detail
3	17 December 2016	(Czech Republic) Nové Město	10 km Pursuit	(France) Anaïs Chevalier	(Italy) Dorothea Wierer	(Russia) Tatiana Akimova	(Germany) Laura Dahlmeier	Detail
3	18 December 2016	(Czech Republic) Nové Město	12.5 km Mass Start	(Czech Republic) Gabriela Koukalová	(Germany) Laura Dahlmeier	(Italy) Dorothea Wierer	(Germany) Laura Dahlmeier	Detail
4	6 January 2017	(Germany) Oberhof	7.5 km Sprint	(Czech Republic) Gabriela Koukalová	(Finland) Kaisa Mäkäräinen	(France) Marie Dorin Habert	(Germany) Laura Dahlmeier	Detail
4	7 January 2017	(Germany) Oberhof	10 km Pursuit	(France) Marie Dorin Habert	(Czech Republic) Gabriela Koukalová	(Finland) Kaisa Mäkäräinen	(Czech Republic) Gabriela Koukalová	Detail
4	8 January 2017	(Germany) Oberhof	12.5 km Mass Start	(Czech Republic) Gabriela Koukalová	(Germany) Laura Dahlmeier	(Czech Republic) Eva Puskarčíková	(Czech Republic) Gabriela Koukalová	Detail
5	14 January 2017	(Germany) Ruhpolding	7.5 km Sprint	(Finland) Kaisa Mäkäräinen	(Czech Republic) Gabriela Koukalová	(Germany) Laura Dahlmeier	(Czech Republic) Gabriela Koukalová	Detail
5	15 January 2017	(Germany) Ruhpolding	10 km Pursuit	(Finland) Kaisa Mäkäräinen	(Czech Republic) Gabriela Koukalová	(France) Marie Dorin Habert	(Czech Republic) Gabriela Koukalová	Detail
6	19 January 2017	(Italy) Antholz-Anterselva	15 km Individual	(Germany) Laura Dahlmeier	(France) Anaïs Chevalier	(Italy) Alexia Runggaldier	(Germany) Laura Dahlmeier	Detail
6	21 January 2017	(Italy) Antholz-Anterselva	12.5 km Mass Start	(Germany) Nadine Horchler	(Germany) Laura Dahlmeier	(Czech Republic) Gabriela Koukalová	(Germany) Laura Dahlmeier	Detail
WC	10 February 2017	(Austria) Hochfilzen	7.5 km Sprint	(Czech Republic) Gabriela Koukalová	(Germany) Laura Dahlmeier	(France) Anaïs Chevalier	(Germany) Laura Dahlmeier	Detail
WC	12 February 2017	(Austria) Hochfilzen	10 km Pursuit	(Germany) Laura Dahlmeier	(Belarus) Darya Domracheva	(Czech Republic) Gabriela Koukalová	(Germany) Laura Dahlmeier	Detail
WC	15 February 2017	(Austria) Hochfilzen	15 km Individual	(Germany) Laura Dahlmeier	(Czech Republic) Gabriela Koukalová	(Italy) Alexia Runggaldier	(Germany) Laura Dahlmeier	Detail
WC	19 February 2017	(Austria) Hochfilzen	12.5 km Mass Start	(Germany) Laura Dahlmeier	(United States) Susan Dunklee	(Finland) Kaisa Mäkäräinen	(Germany) Laura Dahlmeier	Detail
7	2 March 2017	(South Korea) Pyeongchang	7.5 km Sprint	(Germany) Laura Dahlmeier	(Norway) Tiril Eckhoff	(France) Anaïs Chevalier	(Germany) Laura Dahlmeier	Detail
7	4 March 2017	(South Korea) Pyeongchang	10 km Pursuit	(Germany) Laura Dahlmeier	(Finland) Kaisa Mäkäräinen	(France) Anaïs Bescond	(Germany) Laura Dahlmeier	Detail
8	10 March 2017	(Finland) Kontiolahti	7.5 km Sprint	(Norway) Tiril Eckhoff	(Germany) Laura Dahlmeier	(Belarus) Darya Domracheva	(Germany) Laura Dahlmeier	Detail
8	11 March 2017	(Finland) Kontiolahti	10 km Pursuit	(Germany) Laura Dahlmeier	(France) Marie Dorin Habert	(Italy) Lisa Vittozzi	(Germany) Laura Dahlmeier	Detail
9	17 March 2017	(Norway) Oslo Holmenkollen	7.5 km Sprint	(Finland) Mari Laukkanen	(France) Justine Braisaz	(France) Anaïs Bescond	(Germany) Laura Dahlmeier	Detail
9	18 March 2017	(Norway) Oslo Holmenkollen	10 km Pursuit	(Finland) Mari Laukkanen	(Czech Republic) Gabriela Koukalová	(France) Justine Braisaz	(Germany) Laura Dahlmeier	Detail
9	19 March 2017	(Norway) Oslo Holmenkollen	12.5 km Mass Start	(Norway) Tiril Eckhoff	(Czech Republic) Gabriela Koukalová	(Finland) Kaisa Mäkäräinen	(Germany) Laura Dahlmeier	Detail

=== Men's team ===
Event	Date	Place	Discipline	Winner	Second	Third	Det.
2	11 December 2016	(Slovenia) Pokljuka	4x7.5 km Relay	France Jean-Guillaume Béatrix; Quentin Fillon Maillet; Simon Desthieux; Martin Fourcade	Russia Maxim Tsvetkov; Anton Babikov; Matvey Eliseev; Anton Shipulin	Germany Erik Lesser; Matthias Dorfer; Benedikt Doll; Simon Schempp	Detail
5	11 January 2017	(Germany) Ruhpolding	4x7.5 km Relay	Norway Ole Einar Bjørndalen; Vetle Sjåstad Christiansen; Henrik L'Abee-Lund; Emil Hegle Svendsen	Russia Alexey Volkov; Anton Shipulin; Matvey Eliseev; Anton Babikov	Germany Erik Lesser; Benedikt Doll; Arnd Peiffer; Simon Schempp	Detail
6	21 January 2017	(Italy) Antholz-Anterselva	4x7.5 km Relay	Germany Erik Lesser; Benedikt Doll; Arnd Peiffer; Simon Schempp	Norway Lars Helge Birkeland; Henrik L'Abee-Lund; Johannes Thingnes Bø; Emil Hegle Svendsen	Russia Maxim Tsvetkov; Evgeniy Garanichev; Dmitry Malyshko; Anton Babikov	Detail
WC	18 February 2017	(Austria) Hochfilzen	4x7.5 km Relay	Russia Alexey Volkov; Maxim Tsvetkov; Anton Babikov; Anton Shipulin	France Jean-Guillaume Béatrix; Quentin Fillon Maillet; Simon Desthieux; Martin Fourcade	Austria Daniel Mesotitsch; Julian Eberhard; Simon Eder; Dominik Landertinger	Detail
7	5 March 2017	(South Korea) Pyeongchang	4x7.5 km Relay	France Jean-Guillaume Béatrix; Simon Fourcade; Simon Desthieux; Martin Fourcade	Austria Lorenz Wäger; Simon Eder; Julian Eberhard; Dominik Landertinger	Norway Vetle Sjåstad Christiansen; Ole Einar Bjørndalen; Vegard Gjermundshaug; Henrik L'Abee-Lund	Detail

=== Women's team ===
Event	Date	Place	Discipline	Winner	Second	Third	Det.
2	11 December 2016	(Slovenia) Pokljuka	4x6 km Relay	Germany Vanessa Hinz; Franziska Hildebrand; Maren Hammerschmidt; Laura Dahlmeier	France Anaïs Chevalier; Justine Braisaz; Celia Aymonier; Marie Dorin Habert	Ukraine Iryna Varvynets; Yuliia Dzhima; Olena Pidhrushna; Anastasiya Merkushyna	Detail
5	12 January 2017	(Germany) Ruhpolding	4x6 km Relay	Germany Vanessa Hinz; Maren Hammerschmidt; Franziska Preuß; Laura Dahlmeier	France Anaïs Chevalier; Justine Braisaz; Anaïs Bescond; Celia Aymonier	Norway Kaia Wøien Nicolaisen; Hilde Fenne; Tiril Eckhoff; Marte Olsbu	Detail
6	22 January 2017	(Italy) Antholz-Anterselva	4x6 km Relay	Germany Vanessa Hinz; Maren Hammerschmidt; Franziska Hildebrand; Laura Dahlmeier	France Anaïs Chevalier; Justine Braisaz; Anaïs Bescond; Marie Dorin Habert	Italy Lisa Vittozzi; Federica Sanfilippo; Alexia Runggaldier; Dorothea Wierer	Detail
WC	17 February 2017	(Austria) Hochfilzen	4x6 km Relay	Germany Vanessa Hinz; Maren Hammerschmidt; Franziska Hildebrand; Laura Dahlmeier	Ukraine Iryna Varvynets; Yuliia Dzhima; Anastasiya Merkushyna; Olena Pidhrushna	France Anaïs Chevalier; Celia Aymonier; Justine Braisaz; Marie Dorin Habert	Detail
7	5 March 2017	(South Korea) Pyeongchang	4x6 km Relay	Germany Nadine Horchler; Maren Hammerschmidt; Denise Herrmann; Franziska Hildebrand	Norway Kaia Wøien Nicolaisen; Hilde Fenne; Tiril Eckhoff; Marte Olsbu	Czech Republic Jessica Jislová; Eva Puskarčíková; Lucie Charvátová; Gabriela Koukalová	Detail

=== Mixed ===
Event	Date	Place	Discipline	Winner	Second	Third	Det.
1	27 November 2016	(Sweden) Östersund	2x6 km + 2x7.5 km Mixed Relay	Norway Marte Olsbu; Fanny Horn Birkeland; Ole Einar Bjørndalen; Johannes Thingnes Bø	Germany Franziska Hildebrand; Laura Dahlmeier; Benedikt Doll; Arnd Peiffer	Italy Lisa Vittozzi; Dorothea Wierer; Lukas Hofer; Dominik Windisch	Detail
1	27 November 2016	(Sweden) Östersund	1x6 km + 1x7.5 km Single Mixed Relay	France Marie Dorin Habert; Martin Fourcade	Austria Lisa Theresa Hauser; Simon Eder	Germany Franziska Preuß; Erik Lesser	Detail
WC	9 February 2017	(Austria) Hochfilzen	2x6 km + 2x7.5 km Mixed Relay	Germany Vanessa Hinz; Laura Dahlmeier; Arnd Peiffer; Simon Schempp	France Anaïs Chevalier; Marie Dorin Habert; Quentin Fillon Maillet; Martin Fourcade	Russia Olga Podchufarova; Tatiana Akimova; Alexander Loginov; Anton Shipulin	Detail
8	12 March 2017	(Finland) Kontiolahti	1x6 km + 1x7.5 km Single Mixed Relay	Austria Lisa Theresa Hauser; Simon Eder	United States Susan Dunklee; Lowell Bailey	Germany Laura Dahlmeier; Roman Rees	Detail
8	12 March 2017	(Finland) Kontiolahti	2x6 km + 2x7.5 km Mixed Relay	France Marie Dorin Habert; Anaïs Bescond; Simon Desthieux; Quentin Fillon Maillet	Germany Nadine Horchler; Maren Hammerschmidt; Benedikt Doll; Arnd Peiffer	Ukraine Iryna Varvynets; Olga Abramova; Serhiy Semenov; Dmytro Pidruchnyi	Detail

== Standings: Men ==
=== Overall ===
Pos.		Points
1.	(France) Martin Fourcade	1322
2.	(Russia) Anton Shipulin	918
3.	(Norway) Johannes Thingnes Bø	812
4.	(Germany) Arnd Peiffer	746
5.	(Germany) Simon Schempp	741

- Final standings after 26 races.

=== Individual ===
Pos.		Points
1.	(France) Martin Fourcade	162
2.	(Russia) Anton Shipulin	126
3.	(United States) Lowell Bailey	117
4.	(Norway) Johannes Thingnes Bø	115
5.	(Norway) Lars Helge Birkeland	103

- Final standings after 3 races.

=== Sprint ===
Pos.		Points
1.	(France) Martin Fourcade	484
2.	(Austria) Julian Eberhard	345
3.	(Norway) Emil Hegle Svendsen	276
4.	(Germany) Arnd Peiffer	275
5.	(Norway) Johannes Thingnes Bø	269

- Final standings after 9 races.

=== Pursuit ===
Pos.		Points
1.	(France) Martin Fourcade	502
2.	(Russia) Anton Shipulin	392
3.	(Germany) Arnd Peiffer	298
4.	(Norway) Johannes Thingnes Bø	278
5.	(Norway) Emil Hegle Svendsen	249

- Final standings after 9 races.

=== Mass start ===
Pos.		Points
1.	(France) Martin Fourcade	248
2.	(Germany) Simon Schempp	231
3.	(Russia) Anton Shipulin	177
4.	(France) Jean-Guillaume Béatrix	168
5.	(Germany) Erik Lesser	165

- Final standings after 5 races.

=== Relay ===
Pos.		Points
1.	Russia	259
2.	France	242
3.	Germany	237
4.	Norway	228
5.	Austria	216

- Final standings after 5 races.

=== Nation ===
Pos.		Points
1.	Germany	7448
2.	France	7416
3.	Russia	7192
4.	Norway	7181
5.	Austria	6926

- Final standings after 22 races.

== Standings: Women ==
=== Overall ===
Pos.		Points
1.	(Germany) Laura Dahlmeier	1211
2.	(Czech Republic) Gabriela Koukalová	1090
3.	(Finland) Kaisa Mäkäräinen	972
4.	(France) Marie Dorin Habert	857
5.	(Italy) Dorothea Wierer	721

- Final standings after 26 races.

=== Individual ===
Pos.		Points
1.	(Germany) Laura Dahlmeier	180
2.	(Germany) Vanessa Hinz	104
3.	(Czech Republic) Gabriela Koukalová	96
4.	(Italy) Alexia Runggaldier	96
5.	(Ukraine) Olena Pidhrushna	84

- Final standings after 3 races.

=== Sprint ===
Pos.		Points
1.	(Czech Republic) Gabriela Koukalová	377
2.	(Germany) Laura Dahlmeier	372
3.	(Finland) Kaisa Mäkäräinen	337
4.	(France) Marie Dorin Habert	297
5.	(France) Justine Braisaz	282

- Final standings after 9 races.

=== Pursuit ===
Pos.		Points
1.	(Germany) Laura Dahlmeier	405
2.	(Czech Republic) Gabriela Koukalová	385
3.	(Finland) Kaisa Mäkäräinen	368
4.	(France) Marie Dorin Habert	346
5.	(Italy) Dorothea Wierer	287

- Final standings after 9 races.

=== Mass start ===
Pos.		Points
1.	(Czech Republic) Gabriela Koukalová	265
2.	(Germany) Laura Dahlmeier	254
3.	(Finland) Kaisa Mäkäräinen	207
4.	(Ukraine) Yuliia Dzhima	162
5.	(Italy) Dorothea Wierer	156

- Final standings after 5 races.

=== Relay ===
Pos.		Points
1.	Germany	300
2.	France	248
3.	Ukraine	224
4.	Norway	203
5.	Czech Republic	198

- Final standings after 5 races.

=== Nation ===
Pos.		Points
1.	Germany	7953
2.	France	7647
3.	Ukraine	6612
4.	Czech Republic	6565
5.	Italy	6489

- Final standings after 22 races.

== Standings: Mixed ==
=== Mixed relay ===
Pos.		Points
1.	Germany	264
2.	France	257
3.	Austria	201
4.	Norway	195
5.	Russia	195

- Final standings after 5 races.

== Medal table ==
Rank	Nation	Gold	Silver	Bronze	Total
1	Germany	22	11	6	39
2	France	21	15	14	50
3	Norway	6	10	9	25
4	Czech Republic	5	9	7	21
5	Russia	5	6	8	19
6	Finland	4	4	3	11
7	Austria	3	4	4	11
8	United States	1	3	1	5
9	Italy	0	1	9	10
10	Belarus	0	1	3	4
10	Ukraine	0	1	3	4
12	Latvia	0	1	0	1
12	Sweden	0	1	0	1
Totals (13 entries)		67	67	67	201

== Achievements ==
First World Cup career victory

Men

- Anton Babikov (RUS), 25, in his 3rd season — the WC 1 Pursuit in Östersund; it also was his first podium
- Benedikt Doll (GER), 26, in his 7th season — the World Championships Sprint in Hochfilzen; first podium was 2014-15 Sprint in Khanty-Mansiysk
- Lowell Bailey (USA), 35, in his 15th season — the World Championships Individual in Hochfilzen; first podium was 2013-14 Sprint in Kontiolahti

Women

- Tatiana Akimova (RUS), 26, in her 2nd season — the WC 3 Sprint in Nove Mesto; it also was her first podium
- Anaïs Chevalier (FRA), 23, in her 3rd season — the WC 3 Pursuit in Nove Mesto; first podium was 2016-17 Sprint in Nove Mesto
- Nadine Horchler (GER), 30, in her 7th season — the WC 6 Mass Start in Antholz; it also was her first podium
- Mari Laukkanen (FIN), 29, in her 10th season — the WC 9 Sprint in Oslo Holmenkollen; first podium was 2013-14 Sprint in Kontiolahti

First World Cup podium

Men

- Vladimir Chepelin (BLR), 28, in his 8th season — no. 3 in the WC 1 Individual in Östersund
- Michal Krčmář (CZE), 25, in his 5th season — no. 3 in the WC 5 Pursuit in Ruhpolding
- Andrejs Rastorgujevs (LAT), 28, in his 8th season — no. 2 in the WC 9 Mass Start in Oslo Holmenkollen

Women

- Darya Yurkevich (BLR), 28, in her 4th season — no. 3 in the WC 1 Individual in Östersund
- Justine Braisaz (FRA), 20, in her 3rd season — no. 2 in the WC 2 Sprint in Pokljuka
- Eva Puskarčíková (CZE), 25, in her 4th season — no. 3 in the WC 2 Pursuit in Pokljuka
- Anaïs Chevalier (FRA), 23, in her 3rd season — no. 2 in the WC 3 Sprint in Nove Mesto
- Alexia Runggaldier (ITA), 25, in her 4th season — no. 3 in the WC 6 Individual Antholtz
- Lisa Vittozzi (ITA), 22, in her 3rd season — no. 3 in the WC 8 Pursuit Kontiolahti

Victory in this World Cup (all-time number of victories in parentheses)

Men

- Martin Fourcade (FRA), 14 (61) first places
- Johannes Thingnes Bø (NOR), 2 (13) first place
- Simon Schempp (GER), 2 (12) first places
- Anton Shipulin (RUS), 2 (10) first places
- Julian Eberhard (AUT), 2 (3) first places
- Arnd Peiffer (GER), 1 (8) first place
- Anton Babikov (RUS), 1 (1) first place
- Lowell Bailey (USA), 1 (1) first place
- Benedikt Doll (GER), 1 (1) first place

Women

- Laura Dahlmeier (GER), 10 (17) first places
- Gabriela Koukalová (CZE), 5 (17) first places
- Kaisa Mäkäräinen (FIN), 2 (21) first places
- Marie Dorin Habert (FRA), 2 (7) first places
- Tiril Eckhoff (NOR), 2 (4) first places
- Mari Laukkanen (FIN), 2 (2) first places
- Tatiana Akimova (RUS), 1 (1) first place
- Anaïs Chevalier (FRA), 1 (1) first place
- Nadine Horchler (GER), 1 (1) first place

== Retirements ==
The following notable biathletes retired during or after the 2016–17 season:

Men

- Alex Gleave (GBR)
- Daniel Böhm (GER)
- Károly Gombos (HUN)
- Yan Savitskiy (KAZ)
- Ivan Joller (SUI)

Women

- Jitka Landová (CZE)
- Kristel Viigipuu (EST)
- Tina Bachmann (GER)
- Zanna Juskane (LAT)
- Fanny Horn Birkeland (NOR)
- Marion Roenning Huber (NOR)
- Svetlana Sleptsova (RUS)
- Andreja Mali (SLO)
- Teja Gregorin (SLO)
- Jana Gereková (SVK)
