= 2016–17 Biathlon World Cup – Mixed Relay =

The 2016–17 Biathlon World Cup – Mixed Relay started on Sunday 27 November 2016 in Östersund and finished on Sunday 12 March 2017 in Kontiolahti. The defending team was Norway.

The winning team was Germany.

== Competition format ==
The relay teams consist of four biathletes. Legs 1 and 2 are skied by the women, and legs 3 and 4 by the men. The women's legs are 6 kilometres (3.7 mi) and men's legs are 7.5 kilometres (4.7 mi). Every athlete's leg is skied over three laps, with two shooting rounds: one prone and one standing. For every round of five targets there are eight bullets available, though the last three can only be single-loaded manually from the spare round holders or from bullets deposited by the athlete into trays or onto the mat at the firing line. If after eight bullets there are still standing targets, one 150 metres (490 ft) penalty loop must be taken for each remaining target. The first-leg participants all start at the same time, and as in cross-country skiing relays, every athlete of a team must touch the team's next-leg participant to perform a valid changeover. On the first shooting stage of the first leg, the participant must shoot in the lane corresponding to their bib number (bib #10 shoots at lane #10 regardless of their position in the race), then for the remainder of the relay, the athletes shoot at the lane corresponding to the position they arrived (arrive at the range in 5th place, shoot at lane five).

The single mixed relay involves one male and one female biathlete each completing two legs consisting of one prone and one standing shoot. The female biathletes all start the race at the same time and complete one 6 kilometres (3.7 mi) leg before exchanging with their male counterparts who complete one 7.5 kilometres (4.7 mi) leg before exchanging again with the female skier who after completing another leg switches again with the male biathlete who completes the race. The rules regarding shooting are the same as in the regular mixed relay.

== 2015–16 Top 3 standings ==
Medal	Nation	Points
Gold:	Norway	264
Silver:	Germany	252
Bronze:	France	223

== Medal winners ==
Event	Gold	Time	Silver	Time	Bronze	Time
Östersund (MR) details	Norway Marte Olsbu; Fanny Horn Birkeland; Ole Einar Bjørndalen; Johannes Thingnes Bø	1:10:57.1 (0+1) (0+1) (0+0) (0+3) (0+0) (0+0) (0+1) (0+0)	Germany Franziska Hildebrand; Laura Dahlmeier; Benedikt Doll; Arnd Peiffer	1:11:30.8 (0+0) (0+1) (0+0) (0+3) (0+0) (0+1) (0+1) (0+0)	Italy Lisa Vittozzi; Dorothea Wierer; Lukas Hofer; Dominik Windisch	1:11:41.3 (0+3) (0+1) (0+2) (0+1) (0+0) (1+3) (0+1) (0+1)
Östersund (SR) details	France Marie Dorin Habert; Martin Fourcade	35:43.5 (0+0) (0+2) (0+0) (0+0) (0+0) (0+1) (0+0) (0+1)	Austria Lisa Theresa Hauser; Simon Eder	35:59.5 (0+1) (0+1) (0+1) (0+0) (0+1) (0+0) (0+1) (0+1)	Germany Franziska Preuß; Erik Lesser	36:08.7 (0+0) (0+1) (0+0) (0+1) (0+1) (0+0) (0+0) (0+2)
World Championships (MR) details	Germany Vanessa Hinz; Laura Dahlmeier; Arnd Peiffer; Simon Schempp	1:09:06.4 (0+0) (0+2) (0+2) (0+2) (0+0) (0+0) (0+0) (0+1)	France Anaïs Chevalier; Marie Dorin Habert; Quentin Fillon Maillet; Martin Fourcade	1:09:08.6 (0+0) (0+2) (0+0) (0+2) (0+1) (1+3) (0+0) (0+0)	Russia Olga Podchufarova; Tatiana Akimova; Alexandr Loginov; Anton Shipulin	1:09:09.6 (0+0) (0+0) (0+1) (0+0) (0+0) (0+3) (0+0) (0+0)
Kontiolahti (SR) details	Austria Lisa Theresa Hauser; Simon Eder	31:35.1 (0+0) (0+2) (0+0) (0+1) (0+0) (0+2) (0+0) (0+0)	United States Susan Dunklee; Lowell Bailey	32:07.9 (0+0) (0+0) (0+0) (0+2) (0+0) (0+2) (0+0) (0+1)	Germany Laura Dahlmeier; Roman Rees	32:08.4 (0+1) (0+0) (0+0) (0+2) (0+1) (0+2) (0+0) (0+0)
Kontiolahti (MR) details	France Marie Dorin Habert; Anaïs Bescond; Simon Desthieux; Quentin Fillon Maillet	1:11:34.5 (0+0) (0+1) (0+0) (0+1) (0+2) (0+2) (0+1) (0+2)	Germany Nadine Horchler; Maren Hammerschmidt; Benedikt Doll; Arnd Peiffer	1:11:45.5 (0+1) (0+1) (0+2) (0+0) (0+1) (0+2) (0+1) (0+2)	Ukraine Iryna Varvynets; Olga Abramova; Serhiy Semenov; Dmytro Pidruchnyi	1:12:01.6 (0+0) (0+0) (0+3) (0+0) (0+0) (0+1) (0+1) (0+1)

== Standings ==
#	Nation	ÖST MR	ÖST SR	HOC MR	KON SR	KON MR	Total
1	Germany	54	48	60	48	54	264
2	France	40	60	54	43	60	257
3	Austria	30	54	32	60	25	201
4	Norway	60	30	34	31	40	195
4	Russia	43	34	48	27	43	195
6	Ukraine	31	32	40	36	48	187
7	Italy	48	28	43	30	36	185
8	Sweden	38	43	38	34	31	184
9	Czech Republic	36	27	36	38	38	175
10	United States	34	22	25	54	34	169
11	Kazakhstan	26	40	30	40	27	163
12	Switzerland	32	38	27	32	28	157
13	Finland	28	21	31	28	26	134
14	Belarus	27	31	19	26	30	133
15	Slovakia	21	15	29	29	32	126
16	Canada	19	36	28	22	19	124
17	Slovenia	29	20	23	23	24	119
18	Bulgaria	24	25	24	21	22	116
19	Estonia	22	26	20	25	20	113
20	Japan	17	24	26	16	29	112
21	South Korea	23	18	22	24	18	105
22	Poland	25	16	18	18	21	98
23	Lithuania	20	19	17	17	23	96
24	Romania	18	17	21	20	17	93
25	Latvia	—	29	16	19	—	64
26	United Kingdom	—	23	—	—	—	23
