= 2016–17 Biathlon World Cup – Individual Men =

The 2016–17 Biathlon World Cup – Individual Men started on Thursday 1 December 2016 in Östersund and finished on Thursday 16 February 2017 at the World Championships in Hochfilzen. The defending titlist was Martin Fourcade of France.

The small crystal globe winner for the category was Martin Fourcade of France.

== Competition format ==
The 20 kilometres (12 mi) individual race is the oldest biathlon event; the distance is skied over five laps. The biathlete shoots four times at any shooting lane, in the order of prone, standing, prone, standing, totalling 20 targets. For each missed target a fixed penalty time, usually one minute, is added to the skiing time of the biathlete. Competitors' starts are staggered, normally by 30 seconds.

== 2015–16 Top 3 standings ==
Medal	Athlete	Points
Gold:	(France) Martin Fourcade	140
Silver:	(Austria) Simon Eder	138
Bronze:	(Austria) Dominik Landertinger	105

== Medal winners ==
Event	Gold	Time	Silver	Time	Bronze	Time
Östersund details	Martin Fourcade; France	51:33.8 (0+2+0+0)	Johannes Thingnes Bø; Norway	52:03.3 (0+0+0+2)	Vladimir Chepelin; Belarus	52:58.1 (1+0+0+0)
Antholz-Anterselva details	Anton Shipulin; Russia	50:38.1 (0+0+1+0)	Martin Fourcade; France	51:19.1 (0+1+1+0)	Serhiy Semenov; Ukraine	51:34.9 (0+0+0+1)
World Championships details	Lowell Bailey; United States	48:07.4 (0+0+0+0)	Ondřej Moravec; Czech Republic	48:10.7 (0+0+0+0)	Martin Fourcade; France	48:28.6 (1+0+1+0)

== Standings ==
#	Name	ÖST	ANT	HOC	Total
1	Martin Fourcade (FRA)	60	54	48	162
2	Anton Shipulin (RUS)	30	60	36	126
3	Lowell Bailey (USA)	26	31	60	117
4	Johannes Thingnes Bø (NOR)	54	27	34	115
5	Lars Helge Birkeland (NOR)	43	28	32	103
6	Krasimir Anev (BUL)	36	38	25	99
7	Serhiy Semenov (UKR)	0	48	40	88
8	Benjamin Weger (SUI)	31	22	31	84
9	Ole Einar Bjørndalen (NOR)	40	43	0	83
10	Ondřej Moravec (CZE)	24	0	54	78
11	Erik Lesser (GER)	10	20	43	73
12	Michal Krčmář (CZE)	0	34	38	72
13	Simon Schempp (GER)	0	40	28	68
14	Evgeniy Garanichev (RUS)	18	29	21	68
15	Benedikt Doll (GER)	11	30	22	63
16	Quentin Fillon Maillet (FRA)	13	26	24	63
17	Vladimir Chepelin (BLR)	48	3	10	61
18	Simon Eder (AUT)	29	—	29	58
19	Maxim Tsvetkov (RUS)	19	36	—	55
20	Fredrik Lindström (SWE)	32	19	3	54
21	Julian Eberhard (AUT)	23	—	27	50
22	Arnd Peiffer (GER)	9	32	7	48
23	Simon Fourcade (FRA)	28	15	—	43
24	Jean-Guillaume Béatrix (FRA)	6	18	19	43
25	Daniel Mesotitsch (AUT)	15	0	26	41
26	Michal Šlesingr (CZE)	16	0	23	39
27	Andrejs Rastorgujevs (LAT)	38	0	0	38
28	Tim Burke (USA)	25	7	5	37
29	Dominik Windisch (ITA)	0	17	20	37
30	Florian Graf (GER)	34	—	—	34
#	Name	ÖST	ANT	HOC	Total
31	Tuomas Grönman (FIN)	21	10	—	31
32	Kauri Kõiv (EST)	20	0	11	31
33	Alexey Volkov (RUS)	—	—	30	30
34	Leif Nordgren (USA)	DNS	12	18	30
35	Vegard Gjermundshaug (NOR)	17	13	—	30
36	Lukas Hofer (ITA)	22	DNS	7	29
37	Cornel Puchianu (ROU)	27	0	0	27
38	Dominik Landertinger (AUT)	0	11	15	26
39	Vladimir Semakov (UKR)	0	25	—	25
40	Scott Gow (CAN)	0	24	0	24
41	Vladimir Iliev (BUL)	7	0	17	24
42	Simon Desthieux (FRA)	0	23	0	23
43	Lorenz Wäger (AUT)	—	21	—	21
44	Fabien Claude (FRA)	0	4	16	20
45	Matej Kazár (SVK)	5	0	12	17
46	Sebastian Samuelsson (SWE)	—	16	0	16
47	Tomáš Hasilla (SVK)	14	0	0	14
48	Peppe Femling (SWE)	0	14	—	14
49	Emil Hegle Svendsen (NOR)	—	—	14	14
50	Dzmitry Abasheu (BLR)	—	0	13	13
51	Martin Otčenáš (SVK)	12	0	0	12
52	Henrik L'Abée-Lund (NOR)	0	9	—	9
53	Tomáš Krupčík (CZE)	—	—	9	9
54	Yan Savitskiy (KAZ)	0	0	8	8
55	Klemen Bauer (SLO)	8	0	0	8
56	Paul Schommer (USA)	—	8	—	8
57	Lenart Oblak (SLO)	—	6	0	6
58	Anton Sinapov (BUL)	4	—	2	6
59	Sean Doherty (USA)	—	5	0	5
60	Torstein Stenersen (SWE)	0	—	4	4
#	Name	ÖST	ANT	HOC	Total
61	Thomas Bormolini (ITA)	3	0	0	3
62	Anton Babikov (RUS)	0	2	—	2
63	Mitja Drinovec (SLO)	2	DNS	—	2
64	Sergey Bocharnikov (BLR)	0	0	1	1
65	Jaroslav Soukup (CZE)	0	1	—	1
66	Maksim Varabei (BLR)	1	0	—	1
