= 2016–2017 Biathlon World Cup – World Cup 5 =

The 2016–17 Biathlon World Cup – World Cup 5 was held in Ruhpolding, Germany, from 11 January until 15 January 2017.

== Schedule of events ==
Date	Time	Events
January 11	14:30 CET	Men's 4x7.5 km Relay
January 12	14:30 CET	Women's 4x6 km Relay
January 13	14:45 CET	Men's 10 km Sprint
January 14	14:30 CET	Women's 7.5 km Sprint
January 15	11:30 CET	Men's 12.5 km Pursuit
January 15	14:45 CET	Women's 10 km Pursuit

== Medal winners ==
=== Men ===
Event:	Gold:	Time	Silver:	Time	Bronze:	Time
10 km Sprint details	Martin Fourcade; France	22:34.2 (0+0)	Julian Eberhard; Austria	22:52.2 (0+0)	Emil Hegle Svendsen; Norway	23:13.9 (0+0)
12.5 km Pursuit details	Martin Fourcade; France	33:57.5 (0+2+1+0)	Emil Hegle Svendsen; Norway	34:15.8 (0+0+0+0)	Michal Krčmář; Czech Republic	34:17.0 (0+0+0+0)
4x7.5 km Relay details	Norway; Ole Einar Bjoerndalen; Vetle Sjastad Christiansen; Henrik L'Abee-Lund; Emil Hegle Svendsen	1:13:40.7 (0+1) (0+0) (0+0) (0+2) (0+0) (0+2) (0+0) (0+0)	Russia; Alexey Volkov; Anton Shipulin; Matvey Eliseev; Anton Babikov	1:13:45.8 (0+0) (0+0) (0+1) (0+0) (0+0) (0+0) (0+0) (0+1)	Germany; Erik Lesser; Benedikt Doll; Arnd Peiffer; Simon Schempp	1:14:04.2 (0+0) (1+3) (0+0) (0+3) (0+0) (0+2) (0+0) (0+1)

=== Women ===
Event:	Gold:	Time	Silver:	Time	Bronze:	Time
7.5 km Sprint details	Kaisa Mäkäräinen; Finland	20:51.8 (0+0)	Gabriela Koukalová; Czech Republic	21:13.8 (0+0)	Laura Dahlmeier; Germany	21:21.9 (0+0)
10 km Pursuit details	Kaisa Mäkäräinen; Finland	30:58.0 (0+0+1+0)	Gabriela Koukalová; Czech Republic	31:58.9 (2+0+0+0)	Marie Dorin Habert; France	32:21.1 (1+0+1+1)
4x6 km Relay details	Germany; Vanessa Hinz; Maren Hammerschmidt; Franziska Preuss; Laura Dahlmeier	1:09:53.0 (0+0) (0+1) (0+1) (0+1) (0+0) (0+2) (0+0) (0+1)	France; Anais Chevalier; Justine Braisaz; Anais Bescond; Celia Aymonier	1:09:56.5 (0+1) (0+0) (0+0) (0+3) (0+1) (0+2) (0+0) (0+0)	Norway; Kaia Wøien Nicolaisen; Hilde Fenne; Tiril Eckhoff; Marte Olsbu	1:09:57.5 (0+0) (0+0) (0+0) (0+0) (0+1) (0+0) (0+0) (0+0)

== Achievements ==
Best performance for all time

- Matthias Bischl (GER), 16th place in Sprint
- Michael Willeitner (GER), 38th place in Sprint
- Michal Krčmář (CZE), 3rd place in Pursuit
- Hanna Oeberg (SWE), 7th place in Sprint and 5th in Pursuit
- Markéta Davidová (CZE), 28th place in Sprint
- Lisa Vittozzi (ITA), 10th place in Pursuit
- Irina Uslugina (RUS), 22nd place in Pursuit
- Julia Simon (FRA), 40th place in Pursuit

First World Cup race

- Eligius Tambornino (SUI), 72nd place in Sprint
- Julia Simon (FRA), 45th place in Sprint
