= 2016–17 Biathlon World Cup – World Cup 3 =

The 2016–17 Biathlon World Cup – World Cup 3 was held in Nové Město na Moravě, Czech Republic, from 15 December until 18 December 2016.

== Schedule of events ==
Date	Time	Events
December 15	17:30 CET	Men's 10 km Sprint
December 16	17:30 CET	Women's 7.5 km Sprint
December 17	15:00 CET	Men's 12.5 km Pursuit
December 17	17:40 CET	Women's 10 km Pursuit
December 18	11:45 CET	Men 15 km Mass Start
December 18	14:15 CET	Women 12.5 km Mass Start

== Medal winners ==
=== Men ===
Event:	Gold:	Time	Silver:	Time	Bronze:	Time
10 km Sprint details	Martin Fourcade; France	23:48.0 (0+1)	Anton Shipulin; Russia	23:49.6 (0+0)	Emil Hegle Svendsen; Norway	23:54.4 (0+1)
12.5 km Pursuit details	Martin Fourcade; France	32:53.6 (0+1+0+0)	Anton Shipulin; Russia	33:23.8 (0+0+1+1)	Quentin Fillon Maillet; France	33:31.9 (0+0+0+0)
15 km Mass Start details	Martin Fourcade; France	36:18.9 (0+1+0+0)	Simon Schempp; Germany	36:27.2 (1+1+0+0)	Anton Babikov; Russia	36:28.3 (0+0+0+1)

=== Women ===
Event:	Gold:	Time	Silver:	Time	Bronze:	Time
7.5 km Sprint details	Tatiana Akimova; Russia	21:58.9 (0+0)	Anaïs Chevalier; France	22:03.2 (0+0)	Susan Dunklee; United States	22:04.0 (0+0)
10 km Pursuit details	Anaïs Chevalier; France	30:38.1 (1+0+0+0)	Dorothea Wierer; Italy	30:47.6 (0+1+1+0)	Tatiana Akimova; Russia	30:57.5 (1+0+0+0)
12.5 km Mass Start details	Gabriela Koukalová; Czech Republic	34:42.1 (0+1+0+0)	Laura Dahlmeier; Germany	34:45.2 (2+0+0+0)	Dorothea Wierer; Italy	34:51.8 (1+0+0+0)

== Achievements ==
Best performance for all time

- Vladimir Iliev (BUL), 5th place in Sprint
- Sebastian Samuelsson (SWE), 13th place in Sprint
- Tatiana Akimova (RUS), 1st place in Sprint
- Anaïs Chevalier (FRA), 1st place in Pursuit

First World Cup race

- Aristide Begue (FRA), 61st place in Sprint
- Andrzej Nędza-Kubiniec (POL), 90th place in Sprint
- Kosuke Ozaki (JPN), 91st place in Sprint
- Fredrik Gjesbakk (NOR), 92nd place in Sprint
- Matvey Eliseev (RUS), 6th place in Mass Start
- Marketa Davidova (CZE), 69th place in Sprint
