= 2016–17 Biathlon World Cup – World Cup 7 =

The 2016–17 Biathlon World Cup – World Cup 7 was held in Pyeongchang, South Korea, from 2 March until 5 March 2017.

== Schedule of events ==
Date	Time	Events
March 2	12:15 CET	Women's 7.5 km Sprint
March 3	11:00 CET	Men's 10 km Sprint
March 4	10:45 CET	Women's 10 km Pursuit
March 4	12:30 CET	Men's 12.5 km Pursuit
March 5	08:30 CET	Women's 4x6 km Relay
March 5	11:45 CET	Men's 4x7.5 km Relay

== Medal winners ==
=== Men ===
Event:	Gold:	Time	Silver:	Time	Bronze:	Time
10 km Sprint details	Julian Eberhard; Austria	23:11.1 (0+0)	Lowell Bailey; United States	23:51.8 (0+0)	Martin Fourcade; France	23:56.5 (1+1)
12.5 km Pursuit details	Martin Fourcade; France	31:24.2 (0+0+0+0)	Anton Shipulin; Russia	31:58.7 (0+0+0+0)	Julian Eberhard; Austria	32:00.9 (0+2+0+1)
4x7.5 km Relay details	France; Jean Guillaume Beatrix; Simon Fourcade; Simon Desthieux; Martin Fourcade	1:12:09.5 (0+1) (0+2) (0+1) (0+0) (0+1) (0+1) (0+2) (0+2)	Austria; Lorenz Wäger; Simon Eder; Julian Eberhard; Dominik Landertinger	1:12:43.3 (0+0) (0+1) (0+1) (0+1) (0+2) (0+0) (0+2) (0+2)	Norway; Vetle Sjåstad Christiansen; Ole Einar Bjoerndalen; Vegard Gjermundshaug; Henrik L'Abée-Lund	1:12:54.9 (0+0) (0+0) (0+2) (0+1) (0+0) (1+3) (0+0) (0+2)

=== Women ===
Event:	Gold:	Time	Silver:	Time	Bronze:	Time
7.5 km Sprint details	Laura Dahlmeier; Germany	20:43.7 (0+0)	Tiril Eckhoff; Norway	20:52.1 (0+0)	Anaïs Chevalier; France	21:25.3 (0+0)
10 km Pursuit details	Laura Dahlmeier; Germany	27:58.0 (0+0+0+0)	Kaisa Mäkäräinen; Finland	29:10.6 (0+0+2+0)	Anaïs Bescond; France	29:16.9 (0+0+1+0)
4x6 km Relay details	Germany; Nadine Horchler; Maren Hammerschmidt; Denise Herrmann; Franziska Hildebrand	1:07:35.6 (0+0) (0+1) (0+1) (0+1) (0+0) (1+3) (0+1) (0+0)	Norway; Kaia Wøien Nicolaisen; Hilde Fenne; Tiril Eckhoff; Marte Olsbu	1:07:58.4 (0+1) (0+0) (0+1) (1+3) (0+2) (0+1) (0+2) (0+1)	Czech Republic; Jessica Jislová; Eva Puskarčíková; Lucie Charvátová; Gabriela Koukalová	1:07:58.5 (0+2) (0+2) (0+0) (0+0) (0+1) (1+3) (0+0) (0+1)

== Achievements ==
Best performance for all time

- Roman Rees (GER), 13th place in Sprint
- Tomáš Krupčík (CZE), 19th place in Sprint
- Sergey Bocharnikov (BLR), 30th place in Sprint and 18th in Pursuit
- Friedrik Gjesbakk (NOR), 61st place in Sprint
- Fabian Hoerl (AUT), 45th place in Pursuit
- Ivona Fialkova (SVK), 17th place in Sprint
- Marion Roenning Huber (NOR), 50th place in Sprint

First World Cup race

- Timur Makhambetov (RUS), 99th place in Sprint
- Svetlana Mironova (RUS), 64th place in Sprint
