= 2016–17 Biathlon World Cup – World Cup 8 =

The 2016–17 Biathlon World Cup – World Cup 8 was held from 9 March until 12 March 2017. Initially it was planned to be held in Tyumen, Russia, but IBU cancelled the host rights for Russia. On 7 January 2017, IBU announced that Stage 8 will be held in Kontiolahti, Finland.

== Schedule of events ==
Date	Time	Events
March 10	14:30 CET	Men's 10 km Sprint
March 10	17:45 CET	Women's 7.5 km Sprint
March 11	12:00 CET	Men's 12.5 km Pursuit
March 11	15:15 CET	Women's 10 km Pursuit
March 12	13:30 CET	Single Mixed Relay
March 12	16:15 CET	2 x 6 km + 2 x 7.5 km Relay

== Medal winners ==
=== Men ===
Event:	Gold:	Time	Silver:	Time	Bronze:	Time
10 km Sprint details	Martin Fourcade; France	22:17.0 (0+1)	Ondřej Moravec; Czech Republic	22:17.6 (0+0)	Emil Hegle Svendsen; Norway	22:26.4 (0+0)
12.5 km Pursuit details	Arnd Peiffer; Germany	30:35.0 (0+0+0+0)	Simon Eder; Austria	30:35.3 (0+0+1+1)	Emil Hegle Svendsen; Norway	30:37.3 (0+0+1+1)

=== Women ===
Event:	Gold:	Time	Silver:	Time	Bronze:	Time
7.5 km Sprint details	Tiril Eckhoff; Norway	19:18.4 (0+0)	Laura Dahlmeier; Germany	19:36.7 (0+1)	Darya Domracheva; Belarus	19:38.8 (0+0)
10 km Pursuit details	Laura Dahlmeier; Germany	29:54.4 (0+1+0+0)	Marie Dorin Habert; France	30:10.9 (1+0+0+1)	Lisa Vittozzi; Italy	30:14.3 (0+1+0+0)

=== Mixed ===
Event:	Gold:	Time	Silver:	Time	Bronze:	Time
Single Mixed Relay details	Austria; Lisa Theresa Hauser; Simon Eder	31:35.1 (0+0) (0+2) (0+0) (0+1) (0+0) (0+2) (0+0) (0+0)	United States; Susan Dunklee; Lowell Bailey	32:07.9 (0+0) (0+0) (0+0) (0+2) (0+0) (0+2) (0+0) (0+1)	Germany; Laura Dahlmeier; Roman Rees	32:08.4 (0+1) (0+0) (0+0) (0+2) (0+1) (0+2) (0+0) (0+0)
2 x 6 km + 2 x 7.5 km Relay details	France; Marie Dorin Habert; Anaïs Bescond; Simon Desthieux; Quentin Fillon Maillet	1:11:34.5 (0+0) (0+1) (0+0) (0+1) (0+2) (0+2) (0+1) (0+2)	Germany; Nadine Horchler; Maren Hammerschmidt; Benedikt Doll; Arnd Peiffer	1:11:45.5 (0+1) (0+1) (0+2) (0+0) (0+1) (0+2) (0+1) (0+2)	Ukraine; Iryna Varvynets; Olga Abramova; Serhiy Semenov; Dmytro Pidruchnyi	1:12:01.6 (0+0) (0+0) (0+3) (0+0) (0+0) (0+1) (0+1) (0+1)

== Achievements ==
Best performance for all time

- Roman Rees (GER), 12th place in Sprint
- Celia Aymonier (FRA), 7th place in Sprint
- Darya Usanova (KAZ), 14th place in Sprint

First World Cup race
