= Darya Yurkevich =

Belarusian biathlete (born 1988)

Personal information
- Nationality: Belarusian
- Born: 6 March 1988 (age 37); Minsk

Sport
- Country: Belarus
- Sport: Biathlon

Darya Yurkevich (born 6 March 1988) is a Belarusian biathlete. She was born in Minsk. She has competed in the Biathlon World Cup, and represented Belarus at the Biathlon World Championships 2016.
