= 2016–17 Biathlon World Cup – World Cup 2 =

The 2016–17 Biathlon World Cup – World Cup 2 was held in Pokljuka, Slovenia, from 9 December until 11 December 2016.

== Schedule of events ==
| Date | Time | Events |
|---|---|---|
| December 9 | 11:30 CET | Men's 10 km Sprint |
| December 9 | 14:15 CET | Women's 7.5 km Sprint |
| December 10 | 11:45 CET | Men's 12.5 km Pursuit |
| December 10 | 14:45 CET | Women's 10 km Pursuit |
| December 11 | 11:15 CET | Men's 4x7.5 km Relay |
| December 11 | 14:30 CET | Women's 4x6 km Relay |

== Medal winners ==
=== Men ===
| Event: | Gold: | Time | Silver: | Time | Bronze: | Time |
|---|---|---|---|---|---|---|
| 10 km Sprint details | Martin Fourcade; France | 23:11.7 (0+0) | Johannes Thingnes Bø; Norway | 23:25.4 (0+0) | Anton Shipulin; Russia | 23:26.8 (0+0) |
| 12.5 km Pursuit details | Martin Fourcade; France | 30:27.4 (0+0+0+0) | Emil Hegle Svendsen; Norway | 30:33.4 (0+0+0+0) | Anton Shipulin; Russia | 30:33.6 (0+0+0+1) |
| 4x7.5 km Relay details | France; Jean-Guillaume Béatrix; Quentin Fillon Maillet; Simon Desthieux; Martin Fourcade | 1:11:56.5 (0+1) (0+2) (0+1) (0+0) (0+0) (0+2) (0+1) (0+0) | Russia; Maxim Tsvetkov; Anton Babikov; Matvey Eliseev; Anton Shipulin | 1:12:12.2 (0+0) (0+0) (0+1) (0+1) (1+3) (0+0) (0+0) (0+1) | Germany; Erik Lesser; Matthias Dorfer; Benedikt Doll; Simon Schempp | 1:12:18.0 (0+3) (0+2) (0+0) (0+0) (0+3) (0+2) (0+1) (0+0) |

=== Women ===
| Event: | Gold: | Time | Silver: | Time | Bronze: | Time |
|---|---|---|---|---|---|---|
| 7.5 km Sprint details | Laura Dahlmeier; Germany | 19:51.7 (0+0) | Justine Braisaz; France | 19:55.2 (0+0) | Marte Olsbu; Norway | 20:13.0 (0+0) |
| 10 km Pursuit details | Laura Dahlmeier; Germany | 30:43.1 (0+2+0+0) | Kaisa Mäkäräinen; Finland | 30:59.9 (0+0+1+1) | Eva Puskarčíková; Czech Republic | 31:01.8 (1+0+0+0) |
| 4x6 km Relay details | Germany; Vanessa Hinz; Franziska Hildebrand; Maren Hammerschmidt; Laura Dahlmeier | 1:11:31.0 (0+1) (0+2) (0+0) (0+3) (0+0) (0+2) (0+1) (0+0) | France; Anais Chevalier; Justine Braisaz; Celia Aymonier; Marie Dorin Habert | 1:11:41.2 (0+0) (0+1) (0+1) (0+0) (0+1) (0+0) (0+0) (0+0) | Ukraine; Iryna Varvynets; Yuliia Dzhima; Olena Pidhrushna; Anastasiya Merkushyna | 1:12:08.8 (0+0) (0+0) (0+0) (0+1) (0+2) (0+0) (0+0) (0+0) |
