= Tatiana Akimova =

Russian biathlete (born 1990)

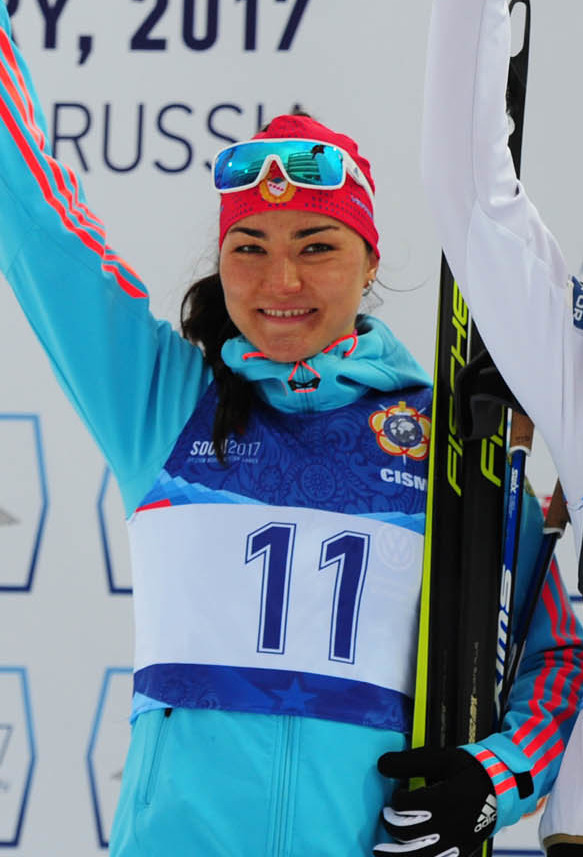

Personal information
- Native name: Татьяна Сергеевна Акимова
- Full name: Tatiana Sergeyevna Akimova
- Nationality: Russian
- Born: 26 October 1990 (age 35) Cheboksary, Chuvash ASSR, Soviet Union
- Height: 168 cm (5 ft 6 in)
- Weight: 57 kg (126 lb)

Sport

Professional information
- Club: CSKA
- World Cup debut: 5 December 2015

World Championships
- Teams: 3 (2016, 2017, 2021)
- Medals: 1

World Cup
- Seasons: 4 (2015/16–2017/18, 2020/21)
- Individual victories: 1
- All victories: 2
- Individual podiums: 2
- All podiums: 4
Medal record
World Championships
Bronze medal – third place	2017 Hochfilzen	Mixed relay
World Military Games
Gold medal – first place	2017 Sochi	7,5 km team sprint
Silver medal – second place	2017 Sochi	7,5 km sprint

Tatiana Sergeyevna Akimova, née Semenova (Russian: Татьяна Сергеевна Акимова; born 26 October 1990) is a Russian biathlete.

She competes in the Biathlon World Cup, and represented Russia at the Biathlon World Championships 2016, the Biathlon World Championships 2017, the 2017 Winter Military World Games, winning a gold medal in 7,5 km team sprint, and 2018 Winter Olympics.

== Results ==
=== Olympic Games ===
Event	Individual	Sprint	Pursuit	Mass start	Relay	Mixed relay
Representing (International Olympic Committee) Olympic Athlete from Russia
(South Korea) 2018 Pyeongchang	15th	20th	31st	30th	—	9th

=== World Championships ===
Event	Individual	Sprint	Pursuit	Mass start	Relay	Mixed relay	Single mixed relay
Representing Russia
(Norway) 2016 Oslo	39th	28th	26th	—	11th	—	—N/a
(Austria) 2017 Hochfilzen	51st	16th	18th	23rd	10th	Bronze	—N/a
Representing Russian Biathlon Union
(Slovenia) 2021 Pokljuka	29th	—	—	—	11th	—	—

*The single mixed relay was added as an event in 2019.

=== World Cup ===
Season	Overall		Individual		Sprint		Pursuit		Mass start	
Season	Points	Position	Points	Position	Points	Position	Points	Position	Points	Position
2015–16	146	45th	2	61st	73	35th	71	35th	—	—
2016–17	479	16th	58	17th	169	15th	148	23rd	104	17th
2017–18	166	39th	20	36th	58	46th	63	38th	25	39th
2020–21	48	66th	12	54th	24	65th	12	65th	―	―

=== Individual Victories ===
- 1 victory – (1 Sp)

No.	Season	Date	Location	Discipline	Level
1	2016/17	16 December 2016	Nové Město, Czech Republic	7.5 km Sprint	World Cup
