= 2016–17 Biathlon World Cup – World Cup 1 =

The 2016–17 Biathlon World Cup – World Cup 1 was the opening event of the season and was held in Östersund, Sweden, from 27 November until 4 December 2016.

== Schedule of events ==
Date	Time	Events
November 27	15:30 CET	2 x 6 km + 2 x 7.5 km Relay
November 27	18:10 CET	Single Mixed Relay
November 30	18:00 CET	Women's 15 km Individual
December 1	18:00 CET	Men's 20 km Individual
December 3	11:45 CET	Women's 7.5 km Sprint
December 3	14:45 CET	Men's 10 km Sprint
December 4	11:15 CET	Women's 10 km Pursuit
December 4	13:20 CET	Men's 12.5 km Pursuit

== Medal winners ==
=== Men ===
Event:	Gold:	Time	Silver:	Time	Bronze:	Time
20 km Individual details	Martin Fourcade; France	51:33.8 (0+2+0+0)	Johannes Thingnes Bø; Norway	52:03.3 (0+0+0+2)	Vladimir Chepelin; Belarus	52:51.8 (1+0+0+0)
10 km Sprint details	Martin Fourcade; France	23:31.9 (0+0)	Fredrik Lindström; Sweden	24:13.4 (0+0)	Arnd Peiffer; Germany	24:15.5 (0+0)
12.5 km Pursuit details	Anton Babikov; Russia	31:22.3 (0+0+1+0)	Maxim Tsvetkov; Russia	31:32.8 (0+0+0+0)	Martin Fourcade; France	31:37.5 (2+0+0+2)

=== Women ===
Event:	Gold:	Time	Silver:	Time	Bronze:	Time
15 km Individual details	Laura Dahlmeier; Germany	46:14.0 (0+0+1+1)	Anais Bescond; France	46:29.8 (0+0+0+1)	Darya Yurkevich; Belarus	47:31.1 (0+0+0+0)
7.5 km Sprint details	Marie Dorin Habert; France	20:09.7 (0+0)	Kaisa Mäkäräinen; Finland	20:21.1 (0+1)	Gabriela Koukalová; Czech Republic	20:29.6 (0+0)
10 km Pursuit details	Gabriela Koukalová; Czech Republic	31:43.3 (0+0+1+0)	Laura Dahlmeier; Germany	31:51.7 (0+1+1+0)	Dorothea Wierer; Italy	32:04.7 (0+0+0+0)

=== Mixed ===
Event:	Gold:	Time	Silver:	Time	Bronze:	Time
Single Mixed Relay details	France; Marie Dorin-Habert; Martin Fourcade	35:43.5 (0+0) (0+2) (0+0) (0+0) (0+0) (0+1) (0+1) (0+0)	Austria; Lisa Theresa Hauser; Simon Eder	35:59.5 (0+1) (0+1) (0+1) (0+0) (0+1) (0+0) (0+1) (0+1)	Germany; Franziska Preuß; Erik Lesser	36:08.7 (0+0) (0+1) (0+0) (0+1) (0+1) (0+0) (0+0) (0+2)
2 x 6 km + 2 x 7.5 km Relay details	Norway; Marte Olsbu; Fanny Horn Birkeland; Ole Einar Bjorndalen; Johannes Thingnes Bø	1:10:57.1 (0+1) (0+1) (0+0) (0+3) (0+0) (0+0) (0+1) (0+0)	Germany; Franziska Hildebrand; Laura Dahlmeier; Benedikt Doll; Arnd Peiffer	1:11:30.8 (0+0) (0+1) (0+0) (0+3) (0+0) (0+1) (0+1) (0+0)	Italy; Lisa Vittozzi; Dorothea Wierer; Lukas Hofer; Dominik Windisch	1:11:41.3 (0+3) (0+1) (0+2) (0+1) (0+0) (0+3) (0+1) (0+1)
