= 2016–2017 Biathlon World Cup – World Cup 4 =

The 2016–17 Biathlon World Cup – World Cup 4 was held in Oberhof, Germany, from 5 January until 8 January 2017.

== Schedule of events ==
Date	Time	Events
January 5	14:15 CET	Men's 10 km Sprint
January 6	14:15 CET	Women's 7.5 km Sprint
January 7	11:30 CET	Men's 12.5 km Pursuit
January 7	14:40 CET	Women's 10 km Pursuit
January 8	12:30 CET	Men 15 km Mass Start
January 8	14:40 CET	Women 12.5 km Mass Start

== Medal winners ==
=== Men ===
Event:	Gold:	Time	Silver:	Time	Bronze:	Time
10 km Sprint details	Julian Eberhard; Austria	27:26.8 (1+0)	Michal Šlesingr; Czech Republic	27:37.6 (0+1)	Dominik Windisch; Italy	28:07.1 (0+1)
12.5 km Pursuit details	Martin Fourcade; France	36:45.7 (0+1+0+0)	Arnd Peiffer; Germany	37:55.6 (0+0+1+2)	Dominik Windisch; Italy	38:18.1 (0+0+3+2)
15 km Mass Start details	Simon Schempp; Germany	38:30.9 (0+0+1+0)	Erik Lesser; Germany	38:31.3 (0+0+0+1)	Martin Fourcade; France	38:31.3 (0+0+2+0)

=== Women ===
Event:	Gold:	Time	Silver:	Time	Bronze:	Time
7.5 km Sprint details	Gabriela Koukalová; Czech Republic	22:28.5 (0+0)	Kaisa Mäkäräinen; Finland	22:49.8 (0+2)	Marie Dorin Habert; France	22:52.5 (0+1)
10 km Pursuit details	Marie Dorin Habert; France	34:33.3 (1+0+0+1)	Gabriela Koukalová; Czech Republic	35:12.1 (0+0+1+2)	Kaisa Mäkäräinen; Finland	35:52.4 (1+0+1+2)
12.5 km Mass Start details	Gabriela Koukalová; Czech Republic	37:20.5 (0+0+0+0)	Laura Dahlmeier; Germany	37:52.0 (0+0+1+0)	Eva Puskarčíková; Czech Republic	38:05.9 (0+0+0+0)

== Achievements ==
Best performance for all time

- Adam Vaclavik (CZE), 17th place in Sprint
- Matthias Bischl (GER), 22nd place in Sprint
- Grzegorz Guzik (POL), 26th place in Sprint
- Martin Jäger (SUI), 29th place in Sprint
- Yury Shopin (RUS), 33rd place in Sprint and 31st place in Pursuit
- Kresimir Crnkovic (CRO), 37th place in Sprint
- Felix Leitner (AUT), 39th place in Sprint
- Remus Faur (ROU), 41st place in Sprint and Pursuit
- Lee In-bok (KOR), 51st place in Sprint
- Giuseppe Montello (ITA), 52nd place in Sprint and 43rd place in Pursuit
- Michal Kubaliak (SVK), 55th place in Sprint and Pursuit
- Vytautas Strolia (LTU), 63rd place in Sprint
- Daumants Lūsa (LAT), 77th place in Sprint
- Jongmin Kim (KOR), 79th place in Sprint
- Vladimir Semakov (UKR), 13th place in Pursuit
- Fabien Claude (FRA), 23rd place in Pursuit
- Dimitar Gerdzhikov (BUL), 38th place in Pursuit
- Celia Aymonier (FRA), 9th place in Sprint
- Chardine Sloof (SWE), 10th place in Sprint
- Anastasiya Merkushyna (UKR), 19th place in Sprint
- Uliana Kaisheva (RUS), 27th place in Sprint

First World Cup race

- Tuukka Invenius (FIN), 82nd place in Sprint
- Martin Ponsiluoma (SWE), 86th place in Sprint
- Roman Yeremin (KAZ), 88th place in Sprint
- Tiia-Maria Talvitie (FIN), 79th place in Sprint
