= 2016–17 Biathlon World Cup – World Cup 9 =

The 2016–17 Biathlon World Cup – World Cup 9 was held in Holmenkollen, Oslo, Norway from 17 March until 19 March 2017.

== Schedule of events ==
Date	Time	Events
March 17	14:00 CET	Women's 7.5 km Sprint
March 17	16:30 CET	Men's 10 km Sprint
March 18	12:45 CET	Women's 10 km Pursuit
March 18	15:00 CET	Men's 12.5 km Pursuit
March 19	11:15 CET	Women 12.5 km Mass Start
March 19	13:30 CET	Men 15 km Mass Start

== Medal winners ==
=== Men ===
Event:	Gold:	Time	Silver:	Time	Bronze:	Time
10 km Sprint details	Johannes Thingnes Bø; Norway	24:53.3 (0+0)	Martin Fourcade; France	25:06.9 (0+1)	Anton Shipulin; Russia	25:14.6 (0+0)
12.5 km Pursuit details	Anton Shipulin; Russia	32:11.9 (0+0+1+0)	Martin Fourcade; France	32:17.6 (1+0+0+1)	Johannes Thingnes Bø; Norway	32:33.5 (1+0+0+1)
15 km Mass Start details	Martin Fourcade; France	37:32.2 (0+0+0+0)	Andrejs Rastorgujevs; Latvia	37:49.6 (0+1+1+0)	Simon Eder; Austria	38:04.6 (0+0+1+0)

=== Women ===
Event:	Gold:	Time	Silver:	Time	Bronze:	Time
7.5 km Sprint details	Mari Laukkanen; Finland	20:33.5 (0+0)	Justine Braisaz; France	20:41.4 (0+0)	Anaïs Bescond; France	20:56.6 (0+0)
10 km Pursuit details	Mari Laukkanen; Finland	29:33.3 (0+0+0+1)	Gabriela Koukalová; Czech Republic	29:59.8 (0+0+0+0)	Justine Braisaz; France	30:34.7 (1+1+0+2)
12.5 km Mass Start details	Tiril Eckhoff; Norway	34:23.1 (0+0+1+0)	Gabriela Koukalová; Czech Republic	34:45.7 (0+1+0+0)	Kaisa Mäkäräinen; Finland	34:57.6 (0+0+1+1)

== Achievements ==
Best performance for all time

- Mari Laukkanen (FIN), 1st place in Sprint
