= Kaia Wøien Nicolaisen =

Norwegian biathlete

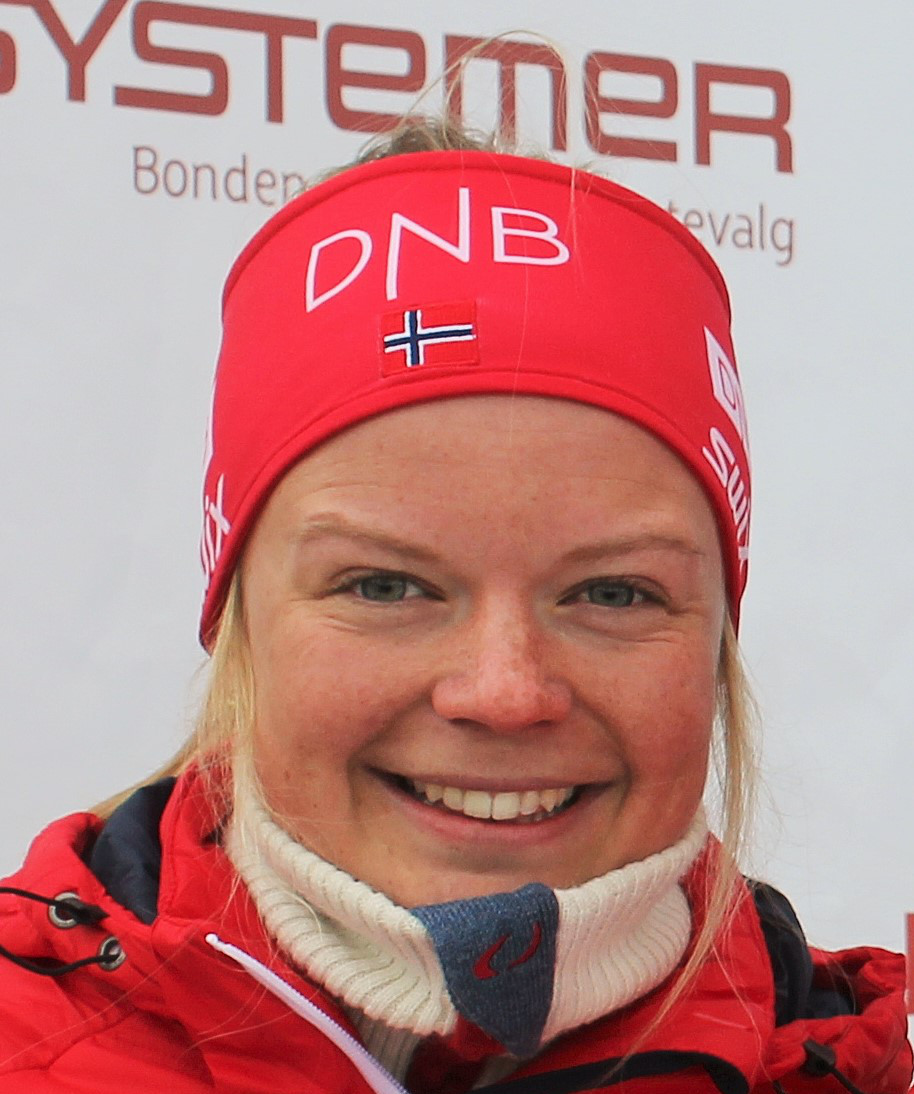
- Nicolaisen in 2016

Personal information
- Nationality: Norwegian
- Born: 23 November 1990 (age 35) Trondheim, Norway

Sport
- Country: Norway
- Sport: Biathlon
Medal record
Junior World Championships
Silver medal – second place	2010 Torsby	3 × 6 km relay
European Championships
Bronze medal – third place	2018 Ridnaun	single mixed relay

Kaia Wøien Nicolaisen (born 23 November 1990) is a Norwegian biathlete. She was born in Trondheim, but represents the club Asker SK. She has competed in the Biathlon World Cup, and represented Norway at the Biathlon World Championships 2016.
