= 2016–17 Biathlon World Cup – World Cup 6 =

The 2016–17 Biathlon World Cup – World Cup 6 was held in Antholz, Italy, from 19 January until 22 January 2017.

== Schedule of events ==
Date	Time	Events
January 19	14:15 CET	Women's 15 km Individual
January 20	14:15 CET	Men's 20 km Individual
January 21	13:30 CET	Women's 12.5 km Mass Start
January 21	15:15 CET	Men's 4x7.5 km Relay
January 22	11:00 CET	Men's 15 km Mass Start
January 22	14:45 CET	Women's 4x6 km Relay

== Medal winners ==
=== Men ===
Event:	Gold:	Time	Silver:	Time	Bronze:	Time
20 km Individual details	Anton Shipulin; Russia	50:38.1 (0+0+1+0)	Martin Fourcade; France	51:19.1 (0+1+1+0)	Serhiy Semenov; Ukraine	51:34.9 (0+0+0+1)
15 km Mass Start details	Johannes Thingnes Bø; Norway	37:04.3 (0+0+0+0)	Quentin Fillon Maillet; France	37:08.0 (1+0+0+0)	Anton Shipulin; Russia	37:26.0 (0+1+0+0)
4x7.5 km Relay details	Germany; Erik Lesser; Benedikt Doll; Arnd Peiffer; Simon Schempp	1:13:57.2 (0+0) (0+2) (0+2) (0+1) (0+0) (0+1) (0+0) (0+1)	Norway; Lars Helge Birkeland; Henrik L'Abee-Lund; Johannes Thingnes Bø; Emil Hegle Svendsen	1:13:57.3 (0+1) (0+1) (0+1) (0+3) (0+1) (0+0) (0+0) (0+2)	Russia; Maxim Tsvetkov; Evgeniy Garanichev; Dmitry Malyshko; Anton Babikov	1:14:30.8 (0+0) (0+0) (0+3) (0+0) (0+2) (0+2) (0+0) (0+2)

=== Women ===
Event:	Gold:	Time	Silver:	Time	Bronze:	Time
15 km Individual details	Laura Dahlmeier; Germany	44:48.7 (1+1+0+0)	Anais Chevalier; France	44:52.5 (0+1+0+0)	Alexia Runggaldier; Italy	45:34.7 (0+1+0+0)
12.5 km Mass Start details	Nadine Horchler; Germany	36:11.5 (0+0+0+0)	Laura Dahlmeier; Germany	36:14.6 (1+0+0+2)	Gabriela Koukalová; Czech Republic	36:19.5 (1+1+0+0)
4x6 km Relay details	Germany; Vanessa Hinz; Maren Hammerschmidt; Franziska Hildebrand; Laura Dahlmeier	1:09:12.4 (0+1) (0+1) (0+0) (0+1) (0+3) (0+1) (0+2) (0+3)	France; Anais Chevalier; Justine Braisaz; Anais Bescond; Marie Dorin Habert	1:09:36.6 (0+1) (0+1) (0+3) (0+0) (0+0) (0+1) (0+0) (0+2)	Italy; Lisa Vittozzi; Federica Sanfilippo; Alexia Runggaldier; Dorothea Wierer	1:09:45.8 (0+1) (0+1) (0+1) (0+2) (0+0) (0+3) (0+0) (0+1)
