= Nadine Horchler =

German biathlete

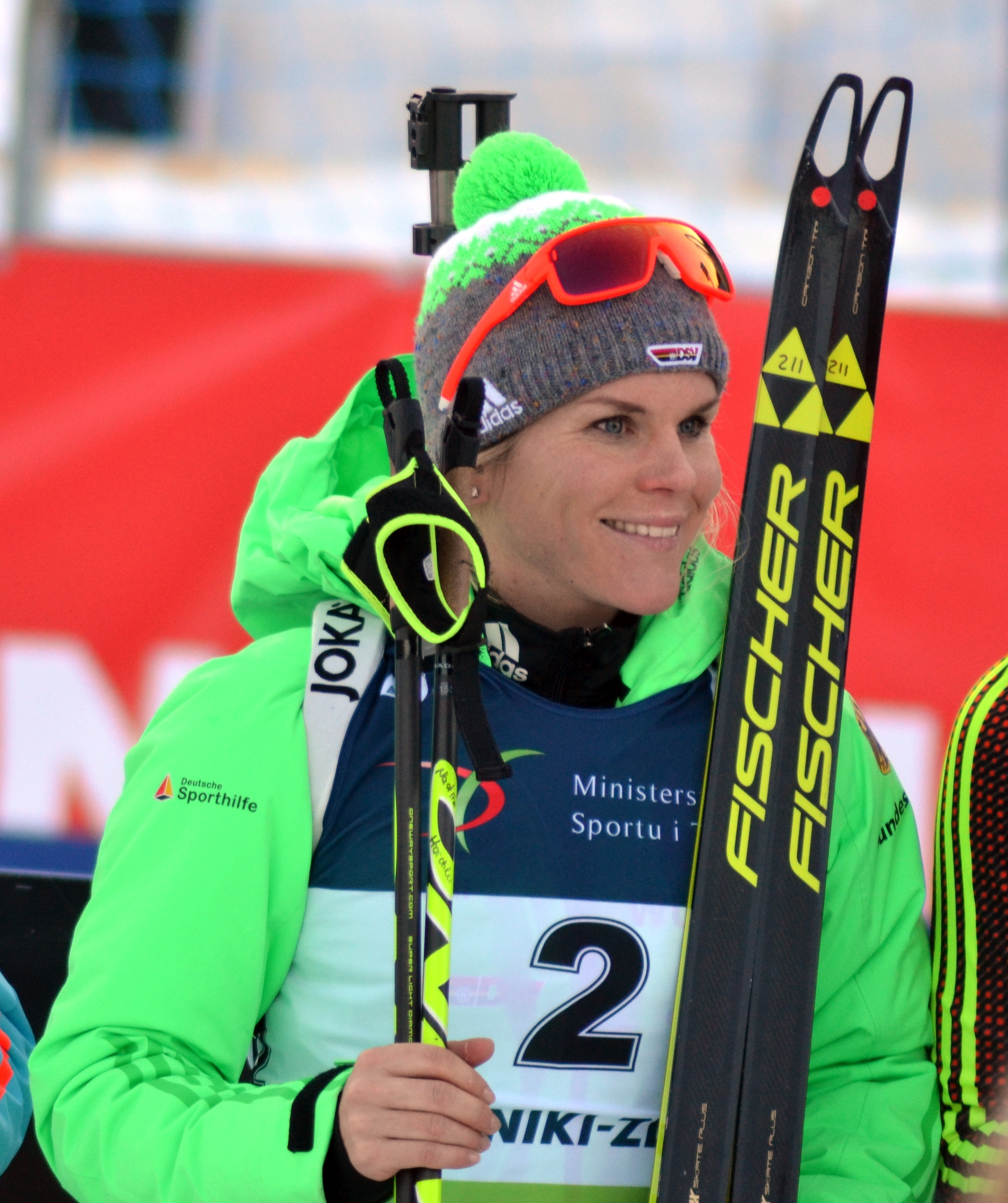

Personal information
- Born: 21 June 1986 (age 40) Arolsen, West Germany

Sport
- Country: Germany
- Sport: Biathlon
- Club: SC Willingen
Medal record
Women's biathlon
Representing Germany
European Championships
Gold medal – first place	2016 Tyumen	7.5 km sprint
Silver medal – second place	2019 Raubichi	Mixed relay
Bronze medal – third place	2011 Ridnaun	10 km pursuit
Bronze medal – third place	2011 Ridnaun	4 × 6 km relay
Bronze medal – third place	2012 Osrblie	4 × 6 km relay
Bronze medal – third place	2019 Raubichi	10 km pursuit

Nadine Horchler (born 21 June 1986) is a German former biathlete. During the 2016–17 Biathlon World Cup season she won the 12.5 km Mass Start race at Rasen-Antholz. She won gold in the 7.5 km sprint at the 2016 IBU Open European Championships.
