= Matvey Eliseev =

Russian biathlete (born 1993)

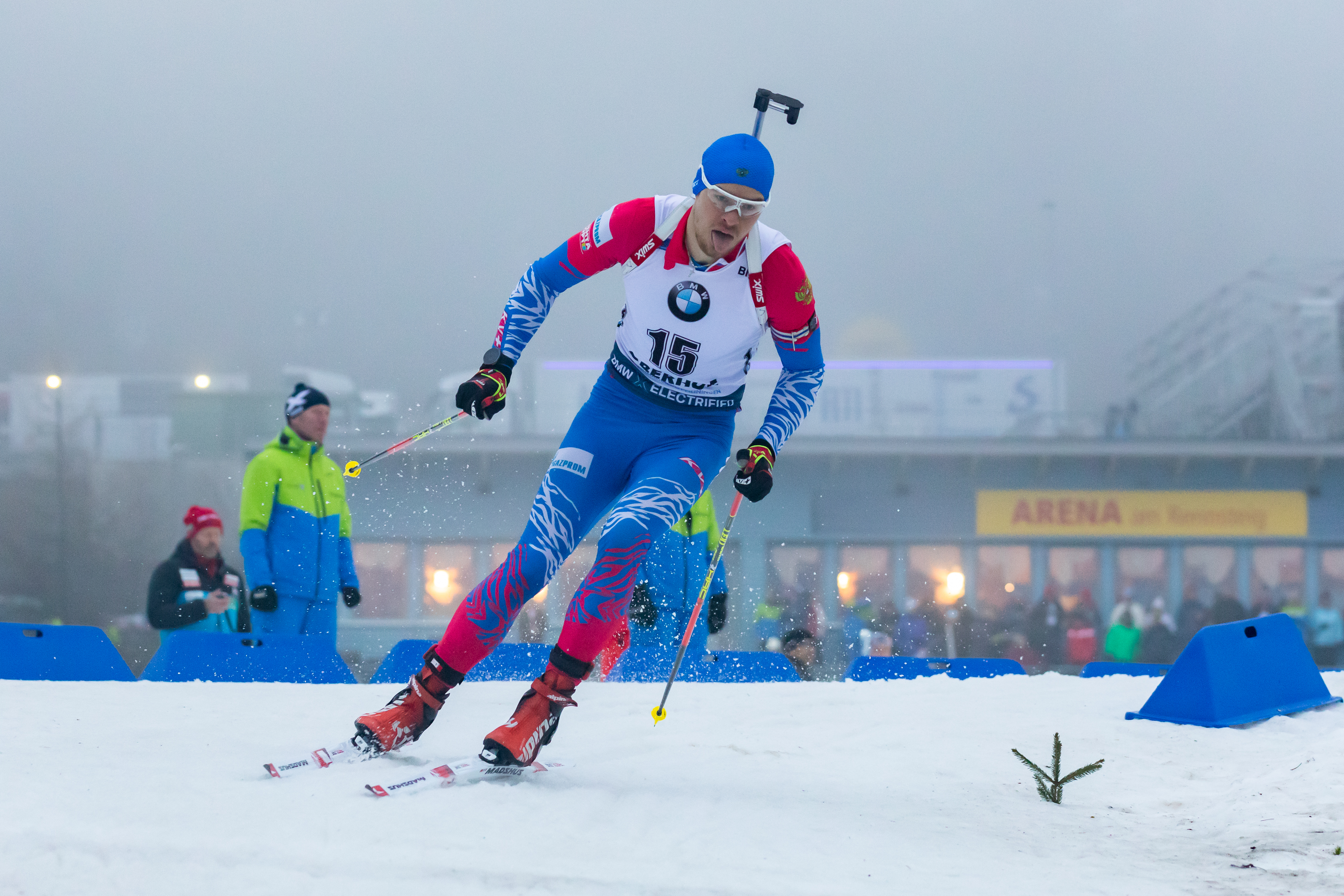
- Eliseev in 2020

Personal information
- Nationality: Russian
- Born: 31 March 1993 (age 33) Zelenograd, Russia
- Height: 1.88 m (6 ft 2 in)
- Weight: 85 kg (187 lb)

Sport

Professional information
- Sport: Biathlon
- World Cup debut: 7 February 2015

Olympic Games
- Teams: 1 (2018)
- Medals: 0

World Championships
- Teams: 3 (2019–2021)
- Medals: 2 (0 gold)

World Cup
- Seasons: 7 (2014/15–)
- Individual podiums: 1
- All podiums: 5
Medal record
Men's biathlon
Representing Russia
World Championships
Bronze medal – third place	2019 Östersund	4 × 7.5 km relay
European Championships
Gold medal – first place	2016 Tumen	Mixed relay
Gold medal – first place	2020 Raubichi	10 km sprint
Silver medal – second place	2019 Raubichi	12.5 km pursuit
World Junior Championships
Bronze medal – third place	2014 Presque Isle	4 × 7.5 km relay
Representing Russian Biathlon Union
World Championships
Bronze medal – third place	2021 Pokljuka	4 × 7.5 km relay
- Updated on 20 February 2021

Matvey Pavlovich Eliseev (Russian: Матвей Павлович Елисеев; born 31 March 1993) is a former Russian biathlete. He competed in the 2018 Winter Olympics.

== Biathlon results ==
All results are sourced from the International Biathlon Union.

=== Olympic Games ===
0 medals

Event	Individual	Sprint	Pursuit	Mass start	Relay	Mixed relay
(South Korea) 2018 Pyeongchang	28th	83rd	—	—	—	9th

=== World Championships ===
2 medals (2 bronze)

Event	Individual	Sprint	Pursuit	Mass start	Relay	Mixed relay	Single mixed relay
(Sweden) 2019 Östersund	—	51st	35th	—	Bronze	—	6th
(Italy) 2020 Antholz-Anterselva	—	12th	55th	28th	4th	6th	7th
(Slovenia) 2021 Pokljuka	60th	18th	16th	15th	Bronze	—	—
