= Anton Babikov =

Russian biathlete

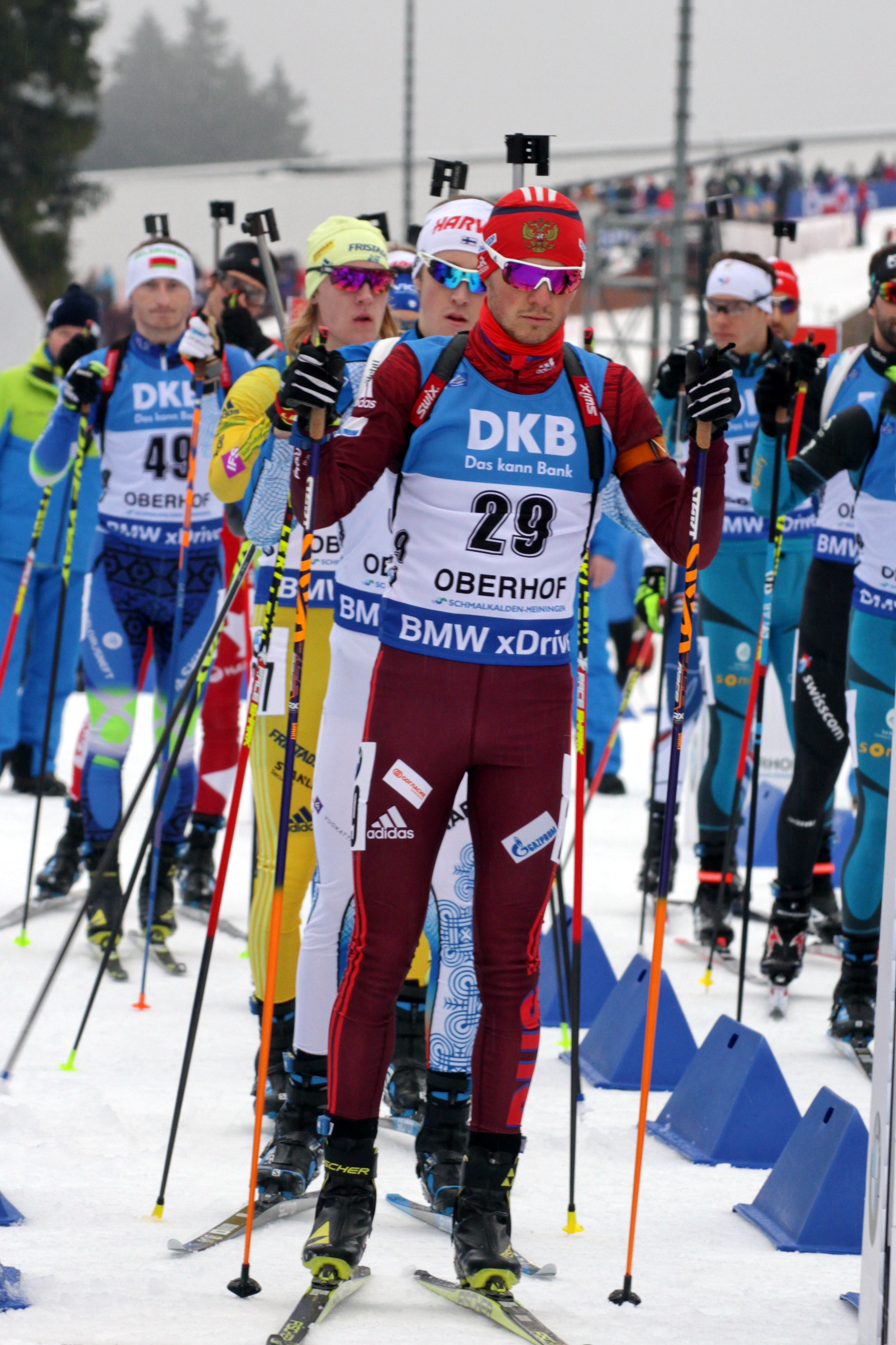
- Babikov in 2018

Personal information
- Native name: Антон Игоревич Бабиков
- Full name: Anton Igorevich Babikov
- Nationality: Russian
- Born: 2 August 1991 (age 34) Ufa, Bashkir ASSR, Soviet Union
- Height: 1.80 m (5 ft 11 in)
- Weight: 66 kg (146 lb)

Sport

Professional information
- World Cup debut: 17 January 2015

World Championships
- Teams: 3 (2016, 2017, 2021)
- Medals: 1 (1 gold)

World Cup
- Seasons: 7 (2014/15–)
- Individual victories: 2
- All victories: 4
- Individual podiums: 3
- All podiums: 12
Medal record
World Championships
Gold medal – first place	2017 Hochfilzen	4 × 7.5 km relay
European Championships
Gold medal – first place	2016 Tumen	12.5 km pursuit
Gold medal – first place	2016 Tumen	Single mixed relay
Gold medal – first place	2022 Arber	Single mixed relay
Silver medal – second place	2022 Arber	20 km individual
Bronze medal – third place	2014 Nové Město	12.5 km pursuit
Bronze medal – third place	2015 Otepää	12.5 km pursuit
Bronze medal – third place	2016 Tumen	10 km sprint

Anton Igorevich Babikov (Russian: Антон Игоревич Бабиков; born 2 August 1991) is a Russian biathlete. He competed in the Biathlon World Cup, and represented Russia at the Biathlon World Championships 2016.

Babikov became an Honored Master of Sports in 2017.

== Biathlon results ==
All results are sourced from the International Biathlon Union.

=== Olympic Games ===
Event	Individual	Sprint	Pursuit	Mass start	Relay	Mixed relay
Representing (International Olympic Committee) Olympic Athlete from Russia
(South Korea) 2018 Pyeongchang	16th	57th	40th	—	—	9th

=== World Championships ===
1 medal (1 gold)

Event	Individual	Sprint	Pursuit	Mass start	Relay	Mixed relay	Single mixed relay
(Norway) 2016 Oslo	—	23rd	21st	16th	6th	—	—N/a
(Austria) 2017 Hochfilzen	—	49th	39th	—	Gold	—	—N/a
(Slovenia) 2021 Pokljuka	—	53rd	56th	—	—	—	—

*The single mixed relay was added as an event in 2019.

=== World Cup ===
Season	Overall		Individual		Sprint		Pursuit		Mass start	
Season	Points	Position	Points	Position	Points	Position	Points	Position	Points	Position
2015–16	132	48th	23	40th	28	61st	56	42nd	25	39th
2016–17	399	24th	2	62nd	100	33rd	157	22nd	140	9th
2017–18										
2019–20										
2020–21										
2021–22			60	7th						

=== Individual victories ===
2 victories (1 Pu, 1 In)

Season	Date	Location	Discipline	Level
2016–17; 1 victories (1 Pu)	4 December 2016	(Sweden) Östersund	12.5 km pursuit	Biathlon World Cup
2021–22; 1 victories (1 In)	20 January 2022	(Italy) Antholz-Anterselva	20 km individual	Biathlon World Cup

*Results are from UIPMB and IBU races which include the Biathlon World Cup, Biathlon World Championships and the Winter Olympic Games.
