= 2017–18 Biathlon World Cup – Sprint Men =

The 2017–18 Biathlon World Cup – Sprint Men started on Saturday 2 December 2017 in Östersund and will finish on Thursday 22 March 2018 in Tyumen. The defending titlist is Martin Fourcade of France.

== Competition format ==
The 10 kilometres (6.2 mi) sprint race is the third oldest biathlon event; the distance is skied over three laps. The biathlete shoots two times at any shooting lane, first prone, then standing, totalling 10 targets. For each missed target the biathlete has to complete a penalty lap of around 150 metres (490 ft). Competitors' starts are staggered, normally by 30 seconds.

== 2016–17 Top 3 standings ==
Medal	Athlete	Points
Gold:	(France) Martin Fourcade	484
Silver:	(Austria) Julian Eberhard	345
Bronze:	(Norway) Emil Hegle Svendsen	276

== Medal winners ==
Event	Gold	Time	Silver	Time	Bronze	Time
Östersund details	Tarjei Bø; Norway	22:40.6 (0+1)	Martin Fourcade; France	22:41.3 (1+0)	Erik Lesser; Germany	22:44.3 (0+1)
Hochfilzen details	Johannes Thingnes Bø; Norway	24:18.4 (0+0)	Martin Fourcade; France	24:30.5 (0+0)	Jakov Fak; Slovenia	24:53.8 (0+0)
Annecy details	Johannes Thingnes Bø; Norway	22:16.9 (0+0)	Martin Fourcade; France	22:38.0 (0+0)	Antonin Guigonnat; France	22:51.6 (0+0)
Oberhof details	Martin Fourcade; France	25:03.3 (0+0)	Emil Hegle Svendsen; Norway	25:11.4 (0+0)	Johannes Thingnes Bø; Norway	25:13.5 (2+0)
Antholz-Anterselva details	Johannes Thingnes Bø; Norway	23:19.3 (1+0)	Martin Fourcade; France	23:32.1 (0+0)	Arnd Peiffer; Germany	24:01.5 (0+0)
Kontiolahti details	Anton Shipulin; Russia	23:51.6 (0+0)	Andrejs Rastorgujevs; Latvia	23:57.4 (0+0)	Quentin Fillon Maillet; France	24:08.9 (0+0)
Oslo Holmenkollen details	Henrik L'Abée-Lund; Norway	26:10.3 (0+0)	Johannes Thingnes Bø; Norway	26:16.4 (0+1)	Martin Fourcade; France	26:17.2 (0+0)
Tyumen details	Martin Fourcade; France	25:49.0 (0+0)	Simon Desthieux; France	26:22.2 (0+0)	Fredrik Lindström; Sweden	26:22.5 (0+0)

== Standings ==
#	Name	ÖST	HOC	ANN	OBE	ANT	KON	OSL	TYU	Total
1	Martin Fourcade (FRA)	54	54	54	60	54	DNS	48	60	384
2	Johannes Thingnes Bø (NOR)	30	60	60	48	60	43	54	27	382
3	Arnd Peiffer (GER)	13	38	19	29	48	40	38	34	259
4	Anton Shipulin (RUS)	16	32	38	13	43	60	23	31	256
5	Andrejs Rastorgujevs (LAT)	34	23	17	—	27	54	26	43	224
6	Simon Desthieux (FRA)	2	20	40	28	30	38	11	54	223
7	Simon Schempp (GER)	40	43	43	7	21	34	0	24	212
8	Jakov Fak (SLO)	31	48	28	36	8	23	9	22	205
9	Lukas Hofer (ITA)	18	26	1	38	14	32	40	28	197
10	Tarjei Bø (NOR)	60	27	0	40	19	8	15	25	194
11	Julian Eberhard (AUT)	20	30	0	23	36	13	43	26	191
12	Benjamin Weger (SUI)	23	36	30	34	25	0	29	13	190
13	Erik Lesser (GER)	48	34	0	—	26	36	5	40	189
14	Lars Helge Birkeland (NOR)	12	28	20	26	38	27	31	3	185
15	Timofey Lapshin (KOR)	28	25	34	27	18	26	0	17	175
16	Quentin Fillon Maillet (FRA)	29	3	0	1	15	48	34	38	168
17	Benedikt Doll (GER)	11	0	29	24	28	18	32	19	161
18	Henrik L'Abée-Lund (NOR)	0	40	DNS	3	3	30	60	16	152
19	Dominik Windisch (ITA)	0	0	32	19	24	31	10	21	137
20	Fredrik Lindström (SWE)	36	0	0	17	—	0	30	48	131
21	Johannes Kühn (GER)	32	17	3	21	22	0	0	29	124
22	Anton Babikov (RUS)	24	11	26	12	34	0	0	0	107
23	Simon Eder (AUT)	27	6	15	—	23	DNS	22	14	107
24	Emil Hegle Svendsen (NOR)	43	—	—	54	9	—	—	—	106
25	Ondřej Moravec (CZE)	0	7	4	30	31	21	12	—	105
26	Maxim Tsvetkov (RUS)	6	21	DNS	0	10	11	14	38	100
27	Alexandr Loginov (RUS)	14	12	23	18	0	—	—	32	99
28	Antonin Guigonnat (FRA)	—	—	48	0	13	0	7	30	98
29	Dmytro Pidruchnyi (UKR)	0	29	—	31	0	0	20	—	80
30	Tim Burke (USA)	0	0	31	43	0	3	0	—	77
#	Name	ÖST	HOC	ANN	OBE	ANT	KON	OSL	TYU	Total
31	Evgeniy Garanichev (RUS)	0	0	22	—	0	0	36	18	76
32	Sean Doherty (USA)	0	19	24	0	0	6	27	—	76
33	Matvey Eliseev (RUS)	9	24	21	20	0	0	0	—	74
34	Jesper Nelin (SWE)	21	9	0	0	—	19	14	9	72
35	Klemen Bauer (SLO)	0	19	0	2	4	22	24	—	71
36	Roman Rees (GER)	—	—	—	11	12	14	28	0	65
37	Dmitry Malyshko (RUS)	—	—	—	—	—	15	25	23	63
38	Mario Dolder (SUI)	38	0	0	—	0	5	17	9	60
39	Krasimir Anev (BUL)	DNS	—	0	—	6	28	16	10	60
40	Erlend Bjøntegaard (NOR)	—	0	16	—	5	17	18	4	60
41	Scott Gow (CAN)	25	0	25	9	—	0	0	—	59
42	Michal Krčmář (CZE)	0	15	7	32	0	0	4	—	58
43	Ole Einar Bjørndalen (NOR)	10	13	—	0	—	29	0	2	54
44	Sebastian Samuelsson (SWE)	5	0	18	4	—	20	6	—	53
45	Lowell Bailey (USA)	19	0	6	—	0	25	0	—	50
46	Sergey Bocharnikov (BLR)	0	—	—	23	—	10	3	11	47
47	Emilien Jacquelin (FRA)	4	0	—	0	40	0	0	0	44
48	Simon Fourcade (FRA)	26	0	0	—	17	0	—	—	43
49	Dominik Landertinger (AUT)	—	—	—	0	0	—	21	20	41
50	Nathan Smith (CAN)	17	22	0	—	—	—	—	—	39
51	Fredrik Gjesbakk (NOR)	—	—	36	—	—	—	—	0	36
52	Tero Seppaelae (FIN)	0	17	10	8	0	0	0	0	35
53	Vladimir Semakov (UKR)	0	5	—	0	29	0	0	—	34
54	Martin Otčenáš (SVK)	0	0	12	—	20	2	0	0	34
55	Artem Pryma (UKR)	0	—	—	25	0	0	8	—	33
56	Philipp Nawrath (GER)	0	32	0	—	—	—	—	—	32
57	Vladimir Chepelin (BLR)	0	—	—	0	32	0	—	—	32
58	Roman Yeremin (KAZ)	0	0	0	—	0	0	19	12	31
59	Vladimir Iliev (BUL)	0	0	14	0	0	16	0	1	31
60	Christian Gow (CAN)	15	0	11	5	—	0	0	—	31
#	Name	ÖST	HOC	ANN	OBE	ANT	KON	OSL	TYU	Total
61	Kalev Ermits (EST)	0	0	27	0	0	0	0	0	27
62	Leif Nordgren (USA)	0	0	0	—	0	24	0	—	24
63	Jean-Guillaume Béatrix (FRA)	22	2	0	0	—	—	—	—	24
64	Tobias Eberhard (AUT)	—	0	13	10	0	0	0	—	23
65	Thomas Bormolini (ITA)	1	0	9	0	0	12	0	0	22
66	Florent Claude (BEL)	—	—	5	15	—	0	—	—	20
67	Tuomas Grönman (FIN)	—	—	2	0	16	0	0	0	18
68	Jaroslav Soukup (CZE)	0	—	—	16	—	0	0	—	16
69	Jeremy Finello (SUI)	0	0	0	14	DNS	0	2	0	16
70	Vetle Sjåstad Christiansen (NOR)	—	—	—	—	—	—	—	15	15
71	Michael Rösch (BEL)	0	14	—	—	1	—	0	0	15
72	Raman Yaliotnau (BLR)	8	0	0	0	7	0	0	0	15
73	Roland Lessing (EST)	—	10	—	0	2	—	—	0	12
74	Grzegorz Guzik (POL)	0	0	0	0	11	0	0	0	11
75	Daniel Mesotitsch (AUT)	0	0	—	0	—	9	0	0	9
76	Serafin Wiestner (SUI)	0	0	8	0	0	—	—	—	8
77	Mikito Tachizaki (JPN)	0	8	0	0	—	—	0	0	8
78	Fabien Claude (FRA)	—	—	—	—	—	—	—	8	8
79	Miha Dovzan (SLO)	0	1	0	0	0	0	0	7	8
80	Rene Zahkna (EST)	7	0	0	0	—	0	0	0	7
81	Anton Sinapov (BUL)	0	0	0	7	0	0	0	0	7
82	Brendan Green (CAN)	0	0	0	0	—	7	0	—	7
83	Felix Leitner (AUT)	0	0	0	0	—	—	0	6	6
84	Maksim Varabei (BLR)	0	0	—	—	0	—	0	5	5
85	Martin Ponsiluoma (SWE)	0	—	—	—	—	4	—	0	4
86	Ruslan Tkalenko (UKR)	0	4	0	0	0	0	0	—	4
87	Michal Šlesingr (CZE)	3	0	0	—	0	DNS	—	—	3
88	Olli Hiidensalo (FIN)	0	0	0	0	0	0	1	0	1
89	Cornel Puchianu (ROU)	0	0	0	0	0	1	0	—	1
