= 2017–18 Biathlon World Cup – Pursuit Men =

The 2017–18 Biathlon World Cup – Pursuit Men started on Sunday 3 December 2017 in Östersund and will finish on Saturday 24 March 2018 in Tyumen. The defending titlist is Martin Fourcade of France.

== Competition format ==
The 12.5 kilometres (7.8 mi) pursuit race is skied over five laps. The biathlete shoots four times at any shooting lane, in the order of prone, prone, standing, standing, totalling 20 targets. For each missed target a biathlete has to run a 150 metres (490 ft) penalty loop. Competitors' starts are staggered, according to the result of the previous sprint race.

== 2016–17 Top 3 standings ==
Medal	Athlete	Points
Gold:	(France) Martin Fourcade	502
Silver:	(Russia) Anton Shipulin	392
Bronze:	(Germany) Arnd Peiffer	298

== Medal winners ==
Event	Gold	Time	Silver	Time	Bronze	Time
Östersund details	Martin Fourcade; France	30:12.2 (1+0+0+0)	Jakov Fak; Slovenia	30:53.0 (1+0+0+1)	Quentin Fillon Maillet; France	30:54.3 (1+0+0+1)
Hochfilzen details	Johannes Thingnes Bø; Norway	36:41.1 (2+0+1+0)	Jakov Fak; Slovenia	37:39.9 (0+0+1+0)	Martin Fourcade; France	37:51.1 (1+0+1+3)
Annecy details	Johannes Thingnes Bø; Norway	32:52.7 (0+0+0+0)	Martin Fourcade; France	33:54.1 (0+0+1+1)	Anton Shipulin; Russia	34:03.2 (0+0+0+1)
Oberhof details	Martin Fourcade; France	32:23.6 (1+0+0+0)	Johannes Thingnes Bø; Norway	32:29.9 (1+1+1+0)	Tarjei Bø; Norway	32:54.5 (0+0+0+0)
Antholz-Anterselva details	Johannes Thingnes Bø; Norway	31:14.4 (0+0+0+0)	Martin Fourcade; France	32:14.9 (1+0+0+0)	Anton Shipulin; Russia	32:32.9 (1+0+0+0)
Oslo Holmenkollen details	Martin Fourcade; France	31:31.6 (1+0+1+0)	Lukas Hofer; Italy	31:49.7 (1+0+0+0)	Johannes Thingnes Bø; Norway	32:04.1 (1+2+0+1)
Tyumen details	Martin Fourcade; France	32:09.7 (0+0+0+1)	Johannes Thingnes Bø; Norway	32:57.6 (0+0+1+0)	Lukas Hofer; Italy	33:18.1 (0+0+0+0)

== Standings ==
#	Name	ÖST	HOC	ANN	OBE	ANT	OSL	TYU	Total
1	Martin Fourcade (FRA)	60	48	54	60	54	60	60	396
2	Johannes Thingnes Bø (NOR)	28	60	60	54	60	48	54	364
3	Anton Shipulin (RUS)	34	32	48	29	48	36	27	254
4	Lukas Hofer (ITA)	30	36	36	38	5	54	48	247
5	Arnd Peiffer (GER)	26	28	30	31	43	31	38	227
6	Lars Helge Birkeland (NOR)	38	31	24	21	32	23	28	197
7	Jakov Fak (SLO)	54	54	28	30	DNS	22	7	195
8	Tarjei Bø (NOR)	22	40	21	48	12	29	21	193
9	Simon Eder (AUT)	27	13	32	—	36	38	34	180
10	Simon Desthieux (FRA)	3	27	38	25	34	30	20	177
11	Benjamin Weger (SUI)	10	19	25	36	29	32	19	170
12	Benedikt Doll (GER)	15	14	34	32	26	34	14	168
13	Henrik L'Abée-Lund (NOR)	29	34	—	17	18	40	29	167
14	Fredrik Lindström (SWE)	40	25	0	26	—	21	43	155
15	Maxim Tsvetkov (RUS)	18	38	—	0	21	43	32	152
16	Simon Schempp (GER)	25	43	40	DNS	DNS	6	26	140
17	Quentin Fillon Maillet (FRA)	48	29	—	1	28	14	16	136
18	Julian Eberhard (AUT)	36	30	DNS	12	31	17	8	134
19	Andrejs Rastorgujevs (LAT)	21	18	22	—	23	26	24	134
20	Emil Hegle Svendsen (NOR)	43	—	—	43	40	—	—	126
21	Erik Lesser (GER)	31	26	9	—	4	16	40	126
22	Antonin Guigonnat (FRA)	—	—	29	14	22	20	36	121
23	Alexandr Loginov (RUS)	6	0	43	23	9	—	30	121
24	Erlend Bjøntegaard (NOR)	—	7	31	—	30	7	25	100
25	Anton Babikov (RUS)	7	21	18	0	27	2	17	92
26	Dominik Windisch (ITA)	—	—	26	0	24	19	23	92
27	Evgeniy Garanichev (RUS)	12	15	17	—	2	27	18	91
28	Lowell Bailey (USA)	24	5	27	—	6	13	—	75
29	Michal Krčmář (CZE)	2	16	19	34	—	0	—	71
30	Dmytro Pidruchnyi (UKR)	—	23	—	40	3	3	—	69
#	Name	ÖST	HOC	ANN	OBE	ANT	OSL	TYU	Total
31	Matvey Eliseev (RUS)	8	22	16	15	8	—	—	69
32	Sebastian Samuelsson (SWE)	11	—	5	18	—	28	—	62
33	Tim Burke (USA)	0	—	15	27	20	0	—	62
34	Ondřej Moravec (CZE)	19	0	0	28	0	12	—	59
35	Sean Doherty (USA)	—	24	11	—	—	24	—	59
36	Émilien Jacquelin (FRA)	13	DNS	—	0	38	—	6	57
37	Roman Rees (GER)	—	—	—	22	1	25	5	53
38	Christian Gow (CAN)	20	0	12	20	—	0	—	52
39	Johannes Kühn (GER)	16	0	0	7	13	—	15	51
40	Simon Fourcade (FRA)	32	—	—	—	16	—	—	48
41	Artem Pryma (UKR)	17	—	—	16	—	15	—	48
42	Jesper Nelin (SWE)	5	20	—	—	—	0	22	47
43	Dominik Landertinger (AUT)	—	—	—	8	19	18	DNS	45
44	Jeremy Finello (SUI)	—	2	20	11	—	11	0	44
45	Krasimir Anev (BUL)	—	—	7	—	26	8	0	41
46	Ole Einar Bjørndalen (NOR)	23	0	—	5	—	—	9	37
47	Sergey Bocharnikov (BLR)	—	—	—	24	—	0	11	35
48	Florent Claude (BEL)	—	—	23	10	—	—	—	33
49	Klemen Bauer (SLO)	0	4	3	2	14	10	—	33
50	Timofey Lapshin (KOR)	DNF	DNS	10	19	DNF	—	3	32
51	Vetle Sjåstad Christiansen (NOR)	—	—	—	—	—	—	31	31
52	Michael Rösch (BEL)	0	9	—	—	15	0	—	24
53	Mario Dolder (SUI)	14	—	—	—	—	9	0	23
54	Michal Šlesingr (CZE)	4	1	DNS	—	17	—	—	22
55	Thomas Bormolini (ITA)	1	11	0	0	—	0	10	22
56	Jean-Guillaume Béatrix (FRA)	0	17	4	—	—	—	—	21
57	Dmitry Malyshko (RUS)	—	—	—	—	—	5	13	18
58	Scott Gow (CAN)	0	0	14	0	—	0	—	14
59	Vladimir Iliev (BUL)	—	—	13	0	—	0	1	14
60	Kalev Ermits (EST)	0	—	8	6	—	—	—	14
#	Name	ÖST	HOC	ANN	OBE	ANT	OSL	TYU	Total
61	Alexey Volkov (RUS)	—	—	—	13	—	—	—	13
62	Philipp Nawrath (GER)	0	12	0	—	—	—	—	12
63	Petr Pashchenko (RUS)	—	—	—	—	—	—	12	12
64	Roland Lessing (EST)	—	0	—	0	11	—	0	11
65	Nathan Smith (CAN)	0	10	—	—	—	—	—	10
66	Grzegorz Guzik (POL)	—	—	—	—	10	—	—	10
67	Tero Seppaelae (FIN)	—	0	DNS	9	0	0	0	9
68	Tomáš Krupčík (CZE)	9	—	0	0	—	—	—	9
69	Brendan Green (CAN)	0	8	—	0	—	—	—	8
70	Adam Václavík (CZE)	—	0	—	—	7	—	—	7
71	Oskars Muiznieks (LAT)	—	0	6	—	—	—	—	6
72	Ruslan Tkalenko (UKR)	—	6	0	—	—	—	—	6
73	Serafin Wiestner (SUI)	0	—	0	4	—	—	—	4
74	Miha Dovžan (SLO)	—	0	0	—	—	0	4	4
75	Olli Hiidensalo (FIN)	—	—	0	—	—	4	0	4
76	Vytautas Strolia (LTU)	0	3	0	—	DNS	0	—	3
77	Tobias Eberhard (AUT)	—	—	0	3	LAP	—	—	3
78	Fabien Claude (FRA)	—	—	—	—	—	—	2	2
78	Fredrik Gjesbakk (NOR)	—	—	2	—	—	—	—	2
80	Leif Nordgren (USA)	—	—	0	—	0	1	—	1
81	Martin Otčenáš (SVK)	—	—	1	—	0	—	—	1
