= 2017–18 Biathlon World Cup – Pursuit Women =

The 2017–18 Biathlon World Cup – Pursuit Women started on Sunday 3 December 2017 in Östersund and will finish on Saturday 24 March 2018 in Tyumen. The defending titlist is Laura Dahlmeier of Germany.

== Competition format ==
The 10 kilometres (6.2 mi) pursuit race is skied over five laps. The biathlete shoots four times at any shooting lane, in the order of prone, prone, standing, standing, totalling 20 targets. For each missed target a biathlete has to run a 150 metres (490 ft) penalty loop. Competitors' starts are staggered, according to the result of the previous sprint race.

== 2016–17 Top 3 standings ==
Medal	Athlete	Points
Gold:	(Germany) Laura Dahlmeier	405
Silver:	(Czech Republic) Gabriela Koukalová	384
Bronze:	(Finland) Kaisa Mäkäräinen	368

== Medal winners ==
Event	Gold	Time	Silver	Time	Bronze	Time
Östersund details	Denise Herrmann; Germany	30:02.7 (0+0+2+0)	Justine Braisaz; France	30:28.5 (0+0+0+0)	Marte Olsbu; Norway	30:50.7 (0+1+0+1)
Hochfilzen details	Anastasiya Kuzmina; Slovakia	34:31.2 (1+0+0+0)	Kaisa Mäkäräinen; Finland	34:41.4 (1+0+0+1)	Darya Domracheva; Belarus	34:43.0 (0+0+1+0)
Annecy details	Laura Dahlmeier; Germany	30:09.9 (0+0+0+1)	Anastasiya Kuzmina; Slovakia	30:23.9 (3+0+0+1)	Lisa Vittozzi; Italy	30:41.7 (1+0+0+0)
Oberhof details	Anastasiya Kuzmina; Slovakia	30:49.5 (0+1+1+0)	Dorothea Wierer; Italy	31:53.9 (0+0+0+0)	Vita Semerenko; Ukraine	31:59.7 (0+0+0+0)
Antholz-Anterselva details	Laura Dahlmeier; Germany	29:45.0 (1+0+0+0)	Dorothea Wierer; Italy	30:02.3 (1+0+1+0)	Darya Domracheva; Belarus	30:05.2 (0+1+0+1)
Oslo Holmenkollen details	Darya Domracheva; Belarus	30:37.4 (1+0+1+0)	Anastasiya Kuzmina; Slovakia	30:46.6 (0+2+2+0)	Susan Dunklee; United States	31:06.9 (1+0+1+0)
Tyumen details	Kaisa Mäkäräinen; Finland	30:52.7 (0+1+1+0)	Anaïs Bescond; France	30:52.9 (0+0+0+1)	Laura Dahlmeier; Germany	31:10.2 (0+0+0+1)

== Standings ==
#	Name	ÖST	HOC	ANN	OBE	ANT	OSL	TYU	Total
1	Anastasiya Kuzmina (SVK)	5	60	54	60	30	54	39	301
2	Kaisa Mäkäräinen (FIN)	36	54	31	40	40	19	60	280
3	Laura Dahlmeier (GER)	—	31	60	36	60	36	48	271
4	Dorothea Wierer (ITA)	28	43	30	54	54	30	25	264
5	Darya Domracheva (BLR)	—	48	—	38	48	60	43	237
6	Anaïs Bescond (FRA)	17	28	29	31	34	23	54	216
7	Denise Herrmann (GER)	60	16	40	25	29	13	14	197
8	Lisa Vittozzi (ITA)	43	20	48	5	32	9	34	191
9	Vanessa Hinz (GER)	34	29	25	23	21	31	13	176
10	Ekaterina Yurlova-Percht (RUS)	30	21	28	29	27	17	6	158
11	Vita Semerenko (UKR)	23	25	34	48	24	—	—	154
12	Veronika Vítková (CZE)	21	30	3	27	36	32	—	149
13	Justine Braisaz (FRA)	54	6	36	32	5	—	—	133
14	Marte Olsbu (NOR)	48	40	0	—	—	22	21	131
15	Marie Dorin Habert (FRA)	27	27	26	DNS	28	21	—	129
16	Maren Hammerschmidt (GER)	40	1	21	22	17	24	3	128
17	Yuliia Dzhima (UKR)	20	38	DNS	28	—	40		126
18	Lisa Theresa Hauser (AUT)	29	DNS	—	13	25	26	26	119
19	Franziska Hildebrand (GER)	6	13	6	30	23	27	12	117
20	Anna Frolina (KOR)	—	7	2	34	14	38	20	115
21	Franziska Preuß (GER)	15	—	0	20	31	16	31	113
22	Galina Vishnevskaya (KAZ)	31	15	—	—	38	1	24	109
23	Nadezhda Skardino (BLR)	38	22	—	19	DNS	29	DNS	108
24	Selina Gasparin (SUI)	8	11	43	10	22	12	—	106
25	Anaïs Chevalier (FRA)	DNS	10	18	0	26	25	22	101
26	Weronika Nowakowska-Ziemniak (POL)	12	17	27	43	—	DNS	DNS	99
27	Célia Aymonier (FRA)	—	18	19	26	13	10	11	97
28	Iryna Kryuko (BLR)	19	32	22	21	—	—	DNS	94
29	Tiril Eckhoff (NOR)	0	—	17	—	43	0	30	90
30	Susan Dunklee (USA)	—	—	38	—	DNS	48	—	86
#	Name	ÖST	HOC	ANN	OBE	ANT	OSL	TYU	Total
31	Fuyuko Tachizaki (JPN)	—	4	0	3	8	43	27	85
32	Valj Semerenko (UKR)	25	23	32	—	—	—	—	80
33	Anastasiya Merkushyna (UKR)	16	19	13	16	—	5	—	69
34	Synnøve Solemdal (NOR)	22	34	—	0	12	0	0	68
35	Olena Pidhrushna (UKR)	32	—	11	24	—	—	—	67
36	Ingrid Landmark Tandrevold (NOR)	—	24	—	15	—	18	8	65
37	Daria Virolaynen (RUS)	0	—	—	17	—	11	36	64
38	Tatiana Akimova (RUS)	14	36	5	8	0	—	—	63
39	Mona Brorsson (SWE)	1	—	15	14	—	28	0	58
40	Mari Laukkanen (FIN)	11	3	24	9	—	DNF	9	56
41	Eva Puskarčíková (CZE)	0	—	16	18	11	7	—	52
42	Uliana Kaisheva (RUS)	—	—	—	—	—	34	16	50
43	Karolin Horchler (GER)	—	9	—	—	—	—	40	49
44	Paulína Fialková (SVK)	—	DNF	0	—	19	2	28	49
45	Lena Häcki (SUI)	24	—	0	—	0	0	23	47
46	Krystyna Guzik (POL)	13	8	20	1	—	—	—	42
47	Federica Sanfilippo (ITA)	0	0	12	0	20	6	—	38
48	Emma Lunder (CAN)	—	14	23	—	—	DNF	—	37
49	Hanna Öberg (SWE)	—	—	4	—	—	14	19	37
50	Julia Ransom (CAN)	18	—	14	4	—	0	—	36
51	Iryna Varvynets (UKR)	—	26	—	0	7	—	—	33
52	Irina Uslugina (RUS)	—	—	—	—	—	—	32	32
53	Hilde Fenne (NOR)	26	5	—	0	—	0	—	31
54	Nadine Horchler (GER)	—	—	—	—	—	—	29	29
55	Alexia Runggaldier (ITA)	10	—	—	—	18	—	—	28
56	Elisa Gasparin (SUI)	0	DNS	—	7	0	20	0	27
57	Katharina Innerhofer (AUT)	—	—	8	—	0	0	18	26
58	Ekaterina Avvakumova (KOR)	0	0	10	—	—	15	—	25
59	Magdalena Gwizdoń (POL)	9	0	9	2	—	0	—	20
60	Svetlana Mironova (RUS)	0	0	—	—	—	—	17	17
#	Name	ÖST	HOC	ANN	OBE	ANT	OSL	TYU	Total
61	Nicole Gontier (ITA)	—	—	—	—	16	—	—	16
62	Kaia Wøien Nicolaisen (NOR)	0	—	—	—	15	—	—	15
63	Julia Schwaiger (AUT)	—	—	—	—	—	—	15	15
64	Linn Persson (SWE)	0	0	—	11	—	0	4	15
65	Emma Nilsson (SWE)	2	—	0	0	6	0	7	15
66	Julia Simon (FRA)	—	—	—	—	0	3	10	13
67	Sari Furuya (JPN)	—	—	0	12	—	—	0	12
68	Johanna Talihärm (EST)	—	12	0	—	—	—	—	12
69	Baiba Bendika (LAT)	—	—	0	—	10	0	0	10
70	Jessica Jislová (CZE)	—	—	1	0	9	—	—	10
71	Kamila Żuk (POL)	—	—	—	—	0	8	0	8
72	Anja Eržen (SLO)	0	0	7	—	—	—	—	7
73	Victoria Slivko (RUS)	7	—	—	—	—	—	—	7
74	Monika Hojnisz (POL)	0	DNS	—	6	—	—	—	6
75	Chloé Chevalier (FRA)	—	—	0	—	—	—	5	5
76	Elisabeth Högberg (SWE)	0	—	—	0	—	4	—	4
77	Anna Magnusson (SWE)	4	0	0	0	—	—	0	4
78	Clare Egan (CAN)	—	0	—	—	4	—	—	4
79	Olga Poltoranina (KAZ)	—	—	—	0	3	—	—	3
80	Tang Jialin (CHN)	3	—	—	—	—	—	—	3
81	Darya Klimina (KAZ)	—	—	—	0	—	—	2	2
82	Markéta Davidová (CZE)	—	0	0	—	2	—	—	2
83	Rosanna Crawford (CAN)	0	2	DNS	—	—	0	—	2
84	Dzinara Alimbekava (BLR)	—	—	0	—	0	—	1	1
85	Alina Raikova (KAZ)	—	0	—	0	1	—	0	1
