= 2017–18 Biathlon World Cup – Nation Men =

== 2016–17 Top 3 standings ==
Medal	Nation	Points
Gold:	Germany	7448
Silver:	France	7416
Bronze:	Russia	7192

== Standings ==
#	Nation	ÖST SR	ÖST MR	ÖST IN	ÖST SP	HOC SP	HOC RL	ANN SP	OBE SP	OBE RL	RUH IN	RUH RL	ANT SP	KON SP	KON SR	KON MR	OSL SP	OSL RL	TYU SP	Total
1	Norway	115	210	417	433	428	420	416	442	360	385	420	417	402	180	180	445	420	368	6458
2	France	165	135	430	409	377	360	442	389	310	412	390	424	386	210	155	393	290	452	6129
3	Germany	195	180	361	420	415	390	391	374	290	401	330	402	410	105	135	398	310	403	5910
4	Russia	125	145	398	354	377	250	387	351	330	308	360	387	386	155	165	384	360	401	5623
5	Italy	135	195	318	298	322	310	342	357	390	352	270	332	375	145	210	332	210	335	5228
6	Austria	210	70	378	330	321	130	324	323	230	354	310	351	313	195	125	386	390	360	5100
7	Sweden	155	155	318	362	270	330	279	292	420	281	290	141	343	110	145	350	330	345	4916
8	Slovenia	—	100	355	317	368	180	313	317	200	341	220	265	344	75	55	333	230	314	4327
9	Switzerland	75	115	327	356	283	270	325	339	270	272	190	276	236	85	65	348	190	280	4302
10	Czech Republic	110	95	301	298	317	140	311	378	180	428	250	300	293	70	90	292	220	—	4073
11	Ukraine	145	110	298	245	338	290	206	354	210	307	170	281	254	165	195	297	200	—	4065
12	Bulgaria	70	80	261	179	196	210	300	246	250	325	230	204	336	40	70	274	130	303	3704
13	United States	65	55	290	283	275	230	361	196	—	319	80	289	355	90	115	324	270	—	3597
14	Canada	50	85	288	357	310	170	285	298	220	256	180	175	218	135	75	247	160	—	3509
15	Belarus	105	105	157	260	218	60	142	300	80	234	160	312	263	60	105	288	250	316	3415
16	Slovakia	95	165	214	212	217	80	280	140	130	271	200	290	268	100	110	210	150	246	3378
17	Finland	55	125	186	150	199	200	296	251	100	266	130	288	236	65	95	289	180	238	3349
18	Estonia	85	45	163	260	184	190	188	254	160	219	150	216	237	80	85	200	170	224	3110
19	Latvia	—	—	289	192	242	220	279	121	140	265	100	214	230	55	—	211	90	272	2920
20	Kazakhstan	180	—	167	110	135	70	160	156	170	272	210	225	222	115	100	203	100	278	2873
21	Romania	45	50	208	185	200	150	146	200	—	138	60	177	226	45	—	178	120	224	2352
22	Lithuania	60	75	203	158	236	100	166	208	110	196	110	158	192	35	60	144	—	138	2349
23	Poland	90	90	109	153	147	90	177	166	90	129	120	242	129	50	50	111	80	133	2156
24	Japan	100	60	175	120	135	110	137	151	150	84	140	95	104	125	80	92	110	173	2141
25	South Korea	80	65	18	165	134	120	151	144	120	40	70	131	147	95	45	105	70	170	1870
26	Belgium	—	—	51	93	114	160	105	115	190	116	90	101	96	—	—	91	140	74	1536
27	United Kingdom	—	—	19	17	11	—	45	47	—	17	—	29	25	30	—	19	—	—	259
28	Greece	—	—	55	9	5	—	21	19	—	11	—	11	57	—	—	27	—	—	215
29	Croatia	—	—	37	51	33	—	33	—	—	15	—	5	—	—	—	—	—	—	174
30	Serbia	—	—	7	7	7	—	15	—	—	13	—	3	—	—	—	—	—	55	107
