= 2017–18 Biathlon World Cup – Nation Women =

== 2016–17 Top 3 standings ==
Medal	Nation	Points
Gold:	Germany	7951
Silver:	France	7646
Bronze:	Ukraine	6605

== Standings ==
#	Nation	ÖST SR	ÖST MR	ÖST IN	ÖST SP	HOC SP	HOC RL	ANN SP	OBE SP	OBE RL	RUH IN	RUH RL	ANT SP	KON SP	KON SR	KON MR	OSL SP	OSL RL	TYU SP	Total
1	Germany	195	180	368	418	373	420	426	400	390	360	420	417	436	105	135	367	390	389	6179
2	France	165	135	366	396	385	360	371	373	420	382	230	393	355	210	155	369	420	402	5887
3	Italy	135	195	284	374	386	200	385	317	290	380	390	374	368	145	210	338	360	276	5407
4	Russia	125	145	315	323	385	330	335	333	330	348	270	347	337	155	165	396	230	368	5237
5	Norway	115	210	404	402	397	190	294	277	220	324	330	355	321	180	180	311	330	392	5232
6	Ukraine	145	110	404	387	388	390	398	344	310	405	210	305	385	165	195	306	250	—	5097
7	Sweden	155	155	380	328	241	250	318	367	360	334	360	261	284	110	145	380	290	306	5024
8	Belarus	105	105	392	325	381	270	341	366	170	404	190	361	416	60	105	318	220	383	4912
9	Switzerland	75	115	292	325	296	310	323	289	190	310	250	323	279	85	65	352	310	343	4532
10	Czech Republic	110	95	345	317	302	290	357	377	230	356	290	392	348	70	90	323	190	—	4482
11	Poland	90	90	260	353	341	180	332	381	250	313	310	204	325	50	50	293	270	274	4366
12	Finland	55	125	316	308	270	160	319	360	270	292	120	287	320	65	95	307	200	339	4208
13	Slovakia	95	165	306	264	326	150	343	160	—	293	200	355	328	100	110	381	—	350	3926
14	Kazakhstan	180	—	299	263	254	210	153	290	120	277	180	314	303	115	100	262	150	317	3787
15	Canada	50	85	300	288	267	230	290	332	180	343	220	139	310	135	75	282	210	—	3736
16	Austria	210	70	304	227	269	—	97	280	200	235	170	280	224	195	125	286	180	354	3706
17	Japan	100	60	216	178	242	220	251	318	210	207	160	160	257	125	80	275	140	302	3501
18	South Korea	80	65	232	235	251	170	276	289	150	123	90	169	242	95	45	264	160	247	3183
19	United States	65	55	209	171	176	—	235	128	—	198	150	273	312	90	115	282	170	—	2629
20	Estonia	85	45	135	153	211	120	185	221	160	153	110	171	104	80	85	159	130	260	2567
21	Bulgaria	70	80	115	160	163	140	193	174	140	158	100	181	155	40	70	202	120	—	2261
22	Lithuania	60	75	93	121	118	130	157	172	—	119	140	159	131	35	60	186	110	67	1933
23	Slovenia	—	100	133	178	178	—	178	67	—	212	—	151	158	75	55	181	—	135	1801
24	China	—	—	112	185	126	—	148	116	130	176	130	130	115	—	—	62	—	158	1588
25	Romania	45	50	40	99	72	—	108	111	—	101	—	131	35	45	—	27	—	90	954
26	Latvia	—	—	112	75	51	—	89	—	—	131	—	125	85	55	—	97	—	82	902
27	United Kingdom	—	—	110	29	88	—	61	41	—	62	—	—	57	30	—	63	—	—	541
28	Moldova	—	—	35	33	37	—	35	—	—	—	—	25	—	—	—	—	—	81	246
29	Spain	—	—	47	63	—	—	—	—	—	—	—	37	—	—	—	—	—	73	220
30	Hungary	—	—	19	25	62	—	—	—	—	—	—	31	—	—	—	—	—	—	137
