= 2017–18 Biathlon World Cup – Mass start Men =

The 2017–18 Biathlon World Cup – Mass start Men started on Sunday 17 December 2017 in Annecy and will finish on Sunday 25 March 2018 in Tyumen. The defending titlist is Martin Fourcade of France.

== Competition format ==
In the mass start, all biathletes start at the same time and the first across the finish line wins. In this 15 kilometres (9.3 mi) competition, the distance is skied over five laps; there are four bouts of shooting (two prone and two standing, in that order) with the first shooting bout being at the lane corresponding to the competitor's bib number (bib #10 shoots at lane #10 regardless of position in race), with the rest of the shooting bouts being on a first-come, first-served basis (if a competitor arrives at the lane in fifth place, they shoot at lane 5). As in the sprint and pursuit, competitors must ski one 150 metres (490 ft) penalty loop for each miss. Here again, to avoid unwanted congestion, World Cup Mass starts are held with only the 30 top ranking athletes on the start line (half that of the pursuit) as here all contestants start simultaneously.

== 2016–17 Top 3 standings ==
Medal	Athlete	Points
Gold:	(France) Martin Fourcade	248
Silver:	(Germany) Simon Schempp	231
Bronze:	(Russia) Anton Shipulin	177

== Medal winners ==
Event	Gold	Time	Silver	Time	Bronze	Time
Annecy details	Martin Fourcade; France	36:30.3 (0+0+0+0)	Johannes Thingnes Bø; Norway	36:34.2 (2+0+0+0)	Erik Lesser; Germany	36:36.5 (0+0+0+0)
Ruhpolding details	Johannes Thingnes Bø; Norway	37:11.2 (0+0+0+1)	Martin Fourcade; France	37:15.7 (0+0+2+0)	Antonin Guigonnat; France	37:19.6 (0+0+0+0)
Antholz-Anterselva details	Martin Fourcade; France	40:18.6 (0+1+0+1)	Tarjei Bø; Norway	40:21.4 (1+0+0+1)	Erlend Bjøntegaard; Norway	40:23.7 (0+1+0+1)
Kontiolahti details	Julian Eberhard; Austria	38:04.8 (0+0+1+1)	Martin Fourcade; France	38:11.7 (2+0+0+0)	Anton Shipulin; Russia	38:24.1 (0+1+0+0)
Tyumen details	Maxim Tsvetkov; Russia	37:37.3 (0+0+0+0)	Erlend Bjøntegaard; Norway	37:40.0 (0+0+0+0)	Johannes Thingnes Bø; Norway	37:53.9 (1+0+1+0)

== Standings ==
#	Name	ANN	RUH	ANT	KON	TYU	Total
1	Martin Fourcade (FRA)	60	54	60	54	22	250
2	Johannes Thingnes Bø (NOR)	54	60	38	22	48	222
3	Benedikt Doll (GER)	23	32	43	43	43	184
4	Tarjei Bø (NOR)	30	40	54	21	38	183
5	Anton Shipulin (RUS)	43	26	32	48	25	174
6	Erik Lesser (GER)	48	23	24	40	32	167
7	Arnd Peiffer (GER)	38	36	22	38	31	165
8	Jakov Fak (SLO)	34	31	29	29	30	153
9	Erlend Bjøntegaard (NOR)	31	—	48	8	54	141
10	Quentin Fillon Maillet (FRA)	21	43	20	31	24	139
11	Simon Desthieux (FRA)	24	30	31	20	29	134
12	Dominik Windisch (ITA)	36	4	34	36	21	131
13	Antonin Guigonnat (FRA)	18	48	16	30	18	130
14	Lukas Hofer (ITA)	26	27	12	28	36	129
15	Simon Eder (AUT)	29	29	26	—	20	104
16	Fredrik Lindström (SWE)	27	22	—	26	28	103
17	Julian Eberhard (AUT)	—	24	4	60	12	100
18	Henrik L'Abée-Lund (NOR)	4	2	30	23	40	99
19	Johannes Kühn (GER)	—	12	40	4	34	90
20	Alexandr Loginov (RUS)	32	8	23	—	27	90
21	Michal Krčmář (CZE)	—	25	25	34	—	84
22	Anton Babikov (RUS)	28	—	14	16	26	84
23	Maxim Tsvetkov (RUS)	20	—	—	—	60	80
24	Benjamin Weger (SUI)	40	—	28	10	2	80
25	Simon Schempp (GER)	12	38	—	25	4	79
26	Lars Helge Birkeland (NOR)	25	16	10	12	10	73
27	Ondřej Moravec (CZE)	—	6	27	32	—	65
28	Andrejs Rastorgujevs (LAT)	8	21	8	18	8	63
29	Emil Hegle Svendsen (NOR)	—	14	36	—	—	50
30	Evgeniy Garanichev (RUS)	22	—	—	—	23	45
31	Lowell Bailey (USA)	16	—	—	27	—	43
32	Krasimir Anev (BUL)	—	18	—	24	—	42
33	Tim Burke (USA)	—	20	18	—	—	38
34	Michal Šlesingr (CZE)	—	34	—	—	—	34
35	Roman Rees (GER)	—	28	—	—	—	28
36	Simon Fourcade (FRA)	—	—	21	—	—	21
37	Timofey Lapshin (KOR)	6	—	—	14	—	20
38	Jesper Nelin (SWE)	—	—	—	—	16	16
39	Sean Doherty (USA)	14	—	—	—		14
39	Vetle Sjåstad Christiansen (SWE)	—	—	—	—	14	14
41	Scott Gow (CAN)	10	—	—	—	—	10
41	Dominik Landertinger (AUT)	—	10	—	—	—	10
43	Ole Einar Bjørndalen (NOR)	—	—	—	6	—	6
43	Dmitry Malyshko (RUS)	—	—	—	—	6	6
43	Émilien Jacquelin (FRA)	—	—	6	—	—	6
46	Leif Nordgren (USA)	—	—	—	2	—	2
46	Vladimir Chepelin (BLR)	—	—	2	—	—	2
46	Matvey Eliseev (RUS)	2	—	—	—	—	2
