= 2017–18 Biathlon World Cup – Relay Men =

The 2017–18 Biathlon World Cup – Relay Men started on Sunday 10 December 2017 in Hochfilzen and will finish on Sunday 18 March 2018 in Oslo Holmenkollen. The defending team is Russia.

== Competition format ==
The relay teams consist of four biathletes. Every athlete's leg is skied over three 2.5 kilometres (1.6 mi) laps for a total of 7.5 kilometres (4.7 mi), with two shooting rounds: one prone and one standing. For every round of five targets there are eight bullets available, though the last three can only be single-loaded manually from the spare round holders or from bullets deposited by the athlete into trays or onto the mat at the firing line. If after eight bullets there are still standing targets, one 150 metres (490 ft) penalty loop must be taken for each remaining target. The first-leg participants start all at the same time, and as in cross-country skiing relays, every athlete of a team must touch the team's next-leg participant to perform a valid changeover. On the first shooting stage of the first leg, the participant must shoot in the lane corresponding to their bib number (bib #10 shoots at lane #10 regardless of their position in the race), then for the remainder of the relay, the athletes shoot at the lane corresponding to the position they arrived (arrive at the range in 5th place, shoot at lane five).

== 2016–17 Top 3 standings ==
Medal	Nation	Points
Gold:	Russia	259
Silver:	France	242
Bronze:	Germany	237

== Medal winners ==
Event	Gold	Time	Silver	Time	Bronze	Time
Hochfilzen details	Norway Ole Einar Bjørndalen; Henrik L'Abée-Lund; Erlend Bjøntegaard; Lars Helge Birkeland	1:21:21.8 (0+2) (0+0) (0+0) (0+3) (0+2) (0+1) (0+0) (0+1)	Germany Erik Lesser; Benedikt Doll; Arnd Peiffer; Simon Schempp	1:23:16.7 (0+0) (0+3) (0+0) (0+3) (0+2) (0+3) (0+3) (0+3)	France Jean-Guillaume Béatrix; Simon Desthieux; Emilien Jacquelin; Quentin Fillon Maillet	1:23:55.8 (0+0) (2+3) (0+2) (0+2) (0+0) (0+3) (0+0) (1+3)
Oberhof details	Sweden Martin Ponsiluoma; Jesper Nelin; Sebastian Samuelsson; Fredrik Lindström	1:19:44.1 (0+1) (0+1) (0+2) (0+0) (0+1) (1+3) (0+0) (0+1)	Italy Thomas Bormolini; Lukas Hofer; Dominik Windisch; Thierry Chenal	1:20:54.9 (0+1) (1+3) (0+3) (0+1) (0+0) (0+0) (0+0) (1+3)	Norway Vetle Sjåstad Christiansen; Henrik L'Abée-Lund; Lars Helge Birkeland; Tarjei Bø	1:21:48.7 (0+0) (0+1) (2+3) (0+2) (1+3) (0+1) (0+2) (0+2)
Ruhpolding details	Norway Lars Helge Birkeland; Tarjei Bø; Emil Hegle Svendsen; Johannes Thingnes Bø	1:13:11.1 (0+1) (0+0) (0+3) (0+0) (0+0) (0+1) (0+0) (0+2)	France Simon Desthieux; Quentin Fillon Maillet; Martin Fourcade; Antonin Guigonnat	1:13:36.0 (0+2) (0+1) (0+2) (0+0) (0+0) (0+0) (0+1) (0+0)	Russia Alexey Volkov; Maxim Tsvetkov; Anton Babikov; Anton Shipulin	1:14:04.5 (0+0) (0+1) (0+2) (0+0) (0+0) (0+0) (0+0) (0+1)
Oslo Holmenkollen details	Norway Lars Helge Birkeland; Henrik L'Abée-Lund; Tarjei Bø; Johannes Thingnes Bø	1:13:13.7 (0+0) (0+0) (0+2) (0+0) (0+1) (0+0) (0+0) (0+0)	Austria Dominik Landertinger; Felix Leitner; Simon Eder; Julian Eberhard	1:14:04.0 (0+0) (0+2) (0+1) (0+1) (0+0) (0+1) (0+0) (0+0)	Russia Maxim Tsvetkov; Anton Babikov; Dmitry Malyshko; Anton Shipulin	1:14:10.6 (0+0) (0+0) (0+0) (0+1) (0+2) (0+0) (0+0) (0+1)

== Standings ==
#	Nation	HOC	OBE	RUH	OSL	Total
1	Norway	60	48	60	60	228
2	Sweden	43	60	38	43	184
3	France	48	40	54	38	180
4	Germany	54	38	43	40	175
5	Russia	34	43	48	48	173
6	Italy	40	54	36	30	160
7	Austria	22	32	40	54	148
8	Switzerland	36	36	28	28	128
9	Ukraine	38	30	26	29	123
10	Slovenia	27	29	31	32	119
11	Bulgaria	30	34	32	22	118
12	Czech Republic	23	27	34	31	115
13	Canada	26	31	27	25	109
14	Estonia	28	25	24	26	103
15	Finland	29	19	22	27	97
16	Belgium	25	28	18	23	94
17	Slovakia	17	22	29	24	92
18	Belarus	15	17	25	34	91
19	Latvia	31	23	19	18	91
20	Kazakhstan	16	26	30	19	91
21	Japan	20	24	23	20	87
22	United States	32	—	17	36	85
23	South Korea	21	21	16	16	74
24	Poland	18	18	21	17	74
25	Romania	24	0	15	21	60
26	Lithuania	19	20	20	—	59
