= 2017–18 Biathlon World Cup =

Biathlon competition

Discipline	Men	Women
Overall	(France) Martin Fourcade	(Finland) Kaisa Mäkäräinen
Nations Cup	Norway	Germany
Individual	(France) Martin Fourcade (Norway) Johannes Thingnes Bø	(Belarus) Nadezhda Skardino
Sprint	(France) Martin Fourcade	(Slovakia) Anastasiya Kuzmina
Pursuit	(France) Martin Fourcade	(Slovakia) Anastasiya Kuzmina
Mass start	(France) Martin Fourcade	(Finland) Kaisa Mäkäräinen
Relay	Norway	Germany
- Mixed: Italy

Competition

The 2017–18 Biathlon World Cup (BWC) was a multi-race series over a season of biathlon, organised by the International Biathlon Union. The season started on 24 November 2017 in Östersund, Sweden and ended on 25 March 2018 in Tyumen, Russia. The defending overall champions from the 2016–17 Biathlon World Cup were Martin Fourcade of France and Laura Dahlmeier of Germany.

== Calendar ==
Below is the IBU World Cup calendar for the 2017–18 season.

Stage	Location	Date	Individual	Sprint	Pursuit	Mass start	Relay	Mixed relay	Single mixed relay	Details
1	(Sweden) Östersund	26 November–3 December	●	●	●			●	●	details
2	(Austria) Hochfilzen	8–10 December		●	●		●			details
3	(France) Annecy-Le Grand-Bornand	14–17 December		●	●	●				details
4	(Germany) Oberhof	4–7 January		●	●		●			details
5	(Germany) Ruhpolding	10–14 January	●			●	●			details
6	(Italy) Antholz-Anterselva	18–21 January		●	●	●				details
OG	(South Korea) Pyeongchang	9–25 February	Olympic Games							
7	(Finland) Kontiolahti	8–11 March		●		●		●	●	details
8	(Norway) Oslo Holmenkollen	13–18 March		●	●		●			details
9	(Russia) Tyumen	20–25 March		●	●	●				details
Total: 56 (26 men's, 26 women's, 4 mixed)			2	8	7	5	4	2	2	

== World Cup podiums ==
=== Men ===
Stage	Date	Place	Discipline	Winner	Second	Third	Yellow bib (After competition)	Det.
1	30 November 2017	(Sweden) Östersund	20 km Individual	(Norway) Johannes Thingnes Bø	(France) Quentin Fillon Maillet	(France) Martin Fourcade	(Norway) Johannes Thingnes Bø	Detail
1	2 December 2017	(Sweden) Östersund	10 km Sprint	(Norway) Tarjei Bø	(France) Martin Fourcade	(Germany) Erik Lesser	(France) Martin Fourcade	Detail
1	3 December 2017	(Sweden) Östersund	12.5 km Pursuit	(France) Martin Fourcade	(Slovenia) Jakov Fak	(France) Quentin Fillon Maillet	(France) Martin Fourcade	Detail
2	8 December 2017	(Austria) Hochfilzen	10 km Sprint	(Norway) Johannes Thingnes Bø	(France) Martin Fourcade	(Slovenia) Jakov Fak	(France) Martin Fourcade	Detail
2	9 December 2017	(Austria) Hochfilzen	12.5 km Pursuit	(Norway) Johannes Thingnes Bø	(Slovenia) Jakov Fak	(France) Martin Fourcade	(France) Martin Fourcade	Detail
3	15 December 2017	(France) Le Grand-Bornand	10 km Sprint	(Norway) Johannes Thingnes Bø	(France) Martin Fourcade	(France) Antonin Guigonnat	(France) Martin Fourcade	Detail
3	16 December 2017	(France) Le Grand-Bornand	12.5 km Pursuit	(Norway) Johannes Thingnes Bø	(France) Martin Fourcade	(Russia) Anton Shipulin	(France) Martin Fourcade	Detail
3	17 December 2017	(France) Le Grand-Bornand	15 km Mass Start	(France) Martin Fourcade	(Norway) Johannes Thingnes Bø	(Germany) Erik Lesser	(France) Martin Fourcade	Detail
4	5 January 2018	(Germany) Oberhof	10 km Sprint	(France) Martin Fourcade	(Norway) Emil Hegle Svendsen	(Norway) Johannes Thingnes Bø	(France) Martin Fourcade	Detail
4	6 January 2018	(Germany) Oberhof	12.5 km Pursuit	(France) Martin Fourcade	(Norway) Johannes Thingnes Bø	(Norway) Tarjei Bø	(France) Martin Fourcade	Detail
5	10 January 2018	(Germany) Ruhpolding	20 km Individual	(France) Martin Fourcade	(Czech Republic) Ondřej Moravec	(Norway) Johannes Thingnes Bø	(France) Martin Fourcade	Detail
5	14 January 2018	(Germany) Ruhpolding	15 km Mass Start	(Norway) Johannes Thingnes Bø	(France) Martin Fourcade	(France) Antonin Guigonnat	(France) Martin Fourcade	Detail
6	19 January 2018	(Italy) Antholz-Anterselva	10 km Sprint	(Norway) Johannes Thingnes Bø	(France) Martin Fourcade	(Germany) Arnd Peiffer	(France) Martin Fourcade	Detail
6	20 January 2018	(Italy) Antholz-Anterselva	12.5 km Pursuit	(Norway) Johannes Thingnes Bø	(France) Martin Fourcade	(Russia) Anton Shipulin	(France) Martin Fourcade	Detail
6	21 January 2018	(Italy) Antholz-Anterselva	15 km Mass Start	(France) Martin Fourcade	(Norway) Tarjei Bø	(Norway) Erlend Bjøntegaard	(France) Martin Fourcade	Detail
OG	11 February 2018	(South Korea) Pyeongchang	10 km Sprint	(Germany) Arnd Peiffer	(Czech Republic) Michal Krčmář	(Italy) Dominik Windisch		Detail
OG	12 February 2018	(South Korea) Pyeongchang	12.5 km Pursuit	(France) Martin Fourcade	(Sweden) Sebastian Samuelsson	(Germany) Benedikt Doll		Detail
OG	15 February 2018	(South Korea) Pyeongchang	20 km Individual	(Norway) Johannes Thingnes Bø	(Slovenia) Jakov Fak	(Austria) Dominik Landertinger		Detail
OG	18 February 2018	(South Korea) Pyeongchang	15 km Mass Start	(France) Martin Fourcade	(Germany) Simon Schempp	(Norway) Emil Hegle Svendsen		Detail
7	8 March 2018	(Finland) Kontiolahti	10 km Sprint	(Russia) Anton Shipulin	(Latvia) Andrejs Rastorgujevs	(France) Quentin Fillon Maillet	(France) Martin Fourcade	Detail
7	11 March 2018	(Finland) Kontiolahti	15 km Mass Start	(Austria) Julian Eberhard	(France) Martin Fourcade	(Russia) Anton Shipulin	(France) Martin Fourcade	Detail
8	15 March 2018	(Norway) Oslo Holmenkollen	10 km Sprint	(Norway) Henrik L'Abée-Lund	(Norway) Johannes Thingnes Bø	(France) Martin Fourcade	(France) Martin Fourcade	Detail
8	17 March 2018	(Norway) Oslo Holmenkollen	12.5 km Pursuit	(France) Martin Fourcade	(Italy) Lukas Hofer	(Norway) Johannes Thingnes Bø	(France) Martin Fourcade	Detail
9	22 March 2018	(Russia) Tyumen	10 km Sprint	(France) Martin Fourcade	(France) Simon Desthieux	(Sweden) Fredrik Lindström	(France) Martin Fourcade	Detail
9	24 March 2018	(Russia) Tyumen	12.5 km Pursuit	(France) Martin Fourcade	(Norway) Johannes Thingnes Bø	(Italy) Lukas Hofer	(France) Martin Fourcade	Detail
9	25 March 2018	(Russia) Tyumen	15 km Mass Start	(Russia) Maxim Tsvetkov	(Norway) Erlend Bjøntegaard	(Norway) Johannes Thingnes Bø	(France) Martin Fourcade	Detail

=== Women ===
Stage	Date	Place	Discipline	Winner	Second	Third	Yellow bib (After competition)	Det.
1	29 November 2017	(Sweden) Östersund	15 km Individual	(Belarus) Nadezhda Skardino	(Norway) Synnøve Solemdal	(Ukraine) Yuliia Dzhima	(Belarus) Nadezhda Skardino	Detail
1	1 December 2017	(Sweden) Östersund	7.5 km Sprint	(Germany) Denise Herrmann	(France) Justine Braisaz	(Ukraine) Yuliia Dzhima	(Norway) Synnøve Solemdal	Detail
1	3 December 2017	(Sweden) Östersund	10 km Pursuit	(Germany) Denise Herrmann	(France) Justine Braisaz	(Norway) Marte Olsbu	(France) Justine Braisaz	Detail
2	8 December 2017	(Austria) Hochfilzen	7.5 km Sprint	(Belarus) Darya Domracheva	(Slovakia) Anastasiya Kuzmina	(Italy) Dorothea Wierer	(France) Justine Braisaz	Detail
2	9 December 2017	(Austria) Hochfilzen	10 km Pursuit	(Slovakia) Anastasiya Kuzmina	(Finland) Kaisa Mäkäräinen	(Belarus) Darya Domracheva	(Finland) Kaisa Mäkäräinen	Detail
3	14 December 2017	(France) Le Grand-Bornand	7.5 km Sprint	(Slovakia) Anastasiya Kuzmina	(Germany) Laura Dahlmeier	(Ukraine) Vita Semerenko	(Finland) Kaisa Mäkäräinen	Detail
3	16 December 2017	(France) Le Grand-Bornand	10 km Pursuit	(Germany) Laura Dahlmeier	(Slovakia) Anastasiya Kuzmina	(Italy) Lisa Vittozzi	(Slovakia) Anastasiya Kuzmina	Detail
3	17 December 2017	(France) Le Grand-Bornand	12.5 km Mass Start	(France) Justine Braisaz	(Belarus) Iryna Kryuko	(Germany) Laura Dahlmeier	(Slovakia) Anastasiya Kuzmina	Detail
4	4 January 2018	(Germany) Oberhof	7.5 km Sprint	(Slovakia) Anastasiya Kuzmina	(Finland) Kaisa Mäkäräinen	(Czech Republic) Veronika Vítková	(Slovakia) Anastasiya Kuzmina	Detail
4	6 January 2018	(Germany) Oberhof	10 km Pursuit	(Slovakia) Anastasiya Kuzmina	(Italy) Dorothea Wierer	(Ukraine) Vita Semerenko	(Slovakia) Anastasiya Kuzmina	Detail
5	11 January 2018	(Germany) Ruhpolding	15 km Individual	(Italy) Dorothea Wierer	(Finland) Kaisa Mäkäräinen	(Canada) Rosanna Crawford	(Slovakia) Anastasiya Kuzmina	Detail
5	14 January 2018	(Germany) Ruhpolding	12.5 km Mass Start	(Finland) Kaisa Mäkäräinen	(Germany) Laura Dahlmeier	(Czech Republic) Veronika Vítková	(Finland) Kaisa Mäkäräinen	Detail
6	18 January 2018	(Italy) Antholz-Anterselva	7.5 km Sprint	(Norway) Tiril Eckhoff	(Germany) Laura Dahlmeier	(Czech Republic) Veronika Vítková	(Finland) Kaisa Mäkäräinen	Detail
6	20 January 2018	(Italy) Antholz-Anterselva	10 km Pursuit	(Germany) Laura Dahlmeier	(Italy) Dorothea Wierer	(Belarus) Darya Domracheva	(Finland) Kaisa Mäkäräinen	Detail
6	21 January 2018	(Italy) Antholz-Anterselva	12.5 km Mass Start	(Belarus) Darya Domracheva	(Slovakia) Anastasiya Kuzmina	(Finland) Kaisa Mäkäräinen	(Finland) Kaisa Mäkäräinen	Detail
OG	10 February 2018	(South Korea) Pyeongchang	7.5 km Sprint	(Germany) Laura Dahlmeier	(Norway) Marte Olsbu	(Czech Republic) Veronika Vítková		Detail
OG	12 February 2018	(South Korea) Pyeongchang	10 km Pursuit	(Germany) Laura Dahlmeier	(Slovakia) Anastasiya Kuzmina	(France) Anaïs Bescond		Detail
OG	15 February 2018	(South Korea) Pyeongchang	15 km Individual	(Sweden) Hanna Öberg	(Slovakia) Anastasiya Kuzmina	(Germany) Laura Dahlmeier		Detail
OG	17 February 2018	(South Korea) Pyeongchang	12.5 km Mass Start	(Slovakia) Anastasiya Kuzmina	(Belarus) Darya Domracheva	(Norway) Tiril Eckhoff		Detail
7	9 March 2018	(Finland) Kontiolahti	7.5 km Sprint	(Belarus) Darya Domracheva	(Germany) Franziska Hildebrand	(Italy) Lisa Vittozzi	(Finland) Kaisa Mäkäräinen	Detail
7	11 March 2018	(Finland) Kontiolahti	12.5 km Mass Start	(Germany) Vanessa Hinz	(Italy) Lisa Vittozzi	(France) Anaïs Chevalier	(Finland) Kaisa Mäkäräinen	Detail
8	15 March 2018	(Norway) Oslo Holmenkollen	7.5 km Sprint	(Slovakia) Anastasiya Kuzmina	(Belarus) Darya Domracheva	(Ukraine) Yuliia Dzhima	(Slovakia) Anastasiya Kuzmina	Detail
8	18 March 2018	(Norway) Oslo Holmenkollen	10 km Pursuit	(Belarus) Darya Domracheva	(Slovakia) Anastasiya Kuzmina	(United States) Susan Dunklee	(Slovakia) Anastasiya Kuzmina	Detail
9	23 March 2018	(Russia) Tyumen	7.5 km Sprint	(Belarus) Darya Domracheva	(Finland) Kaisa Mäkäräinen	(Norway) Tiril Eckhoff	(Slovakia) Anastasiya Kuzmina	Detail
9	24 March 2018	(Russia) Tyumen	10 km Pursuit	(Finland) Kaisa Mäkäräinen	(France) Anaïs Bescond	(Germany) Laura Dahlmeier	(Finland) Kaisa Mäkäräinen	Detail
9	25 March 2018	(Russia) Tyumen	12.5 km Mass Start	(Belarus) Darya Domracheva	(Slovakia) Paulína Fialková	(France) Anaïs Chevalier	(Finland) Kaisa Mäkäräinen	Detail

=== Men's team ===
Stage	Date	Place	Discipline	Winner	Second	Third	Det.
2	10 December 2017	(Austria) Hochfilzen	4x7.5 km Relay	Norway Ole Einar Bjørndalen; Henrik L'Abée-Lund; Erlend Bjøntegaard; Lars Helge Birkeland	Germany Erik Lesser; Benedikt Doll; Arnd Peiffer; Simon Schempp	France Jean-Guillaume Béatrix; Simon Desthieux; Emilien Jacquelin; Quentin Fillon Maillet	Detail
4	7 January 2018	(Germany) Oberhof	4x7.5 km Relay	Sweden Martin Ponsiluoma; Jesper Nelin; Sebastian Samuelsson; Fredrik Lindström	Italy Thomas Bormolini; Lukas Hofer; Dominik Windisch; Thierry Chenal	Norway Vetle Sjåstad Christiansen; Henrik L'Abée-Lund; Lars Helge Birkeland; Tarjei Bø	Detail
5	12 January 2018	(Germany) Ruhpolding	4x7.5 km Relay	Norway Lars Helge Birkeland; Tarjei Bø; Emil Hegle Svendsen; Johannes Thingnes Bø	France Simon Desthieux; Quentin Fillon Maillet; Martin Fourcade; Antonin Guigonnat	Russia Alexey Volkov; Maxim Tsvetkov; Anton Babikov; Anton Shipulin	Detail
OG	23 February 2018	(South Korea) Pyeongchang	4x7.5 km Relay	Sweden Peppe Femling; Jesper Nelin; Sebastian Samuelsson; Fredrik Lindström	Norway Lars Helge Birkeland; Tarjei Bø; Johannes Thingnes Bø; Emil Hegle Svendsen	Germany Erik Lesser; Benedikt Doll; Arnd Peiffer; Simon Schempp	Detail
8	18 March 2018	(Norway) Oslo Holmenkollen	4x7.5 km Relay	Norway Lars Helge Birkeland; Henrik L'Abée-Lund; Tarjei Bø; Johannes Thingnes Bø	Austria Dominik Landertinger; Felix Leitner; Simon Eder; Julian Eberhard	Russia Maxim Tsvetkov; Anton Babikov; Dmitry Malyshko; Anton Shipulin	Detail

=== Women's team ===
Stage	Date	Place	Discipline	Winner	Second	Third	Det.
2	10 December 2017	(Austria) Hochfilzen	4x6 km Relay	Germany Vanessa Hinz; Franziska Hildebrand; Maren Hammerschmidt; Laura Dahlmeier	Ukraine Vita Semerenko; Yuliia Dzhima; Valentyna Semerenko; Olena Pidhrushna	France Marie Dorin Habert; Célia Aymonier; Justine Braisaz; Anaïs Bescond	Detail
4	7 January 2018	(Germany) Oberhof	4x6 km Relay	France Anaïs Bescond; Anaïs Chevalier; Célia Aymonier; Justine Braisaz	Germany Vanessa Hinz; Denise Herrmann; Franziska Preuß; Maren Hammerschmidt	Sweden Linn Persson; Anna Magnusson; Elisabeth Högberg; Mona Brorsson	Detail
5	13 January 2018	(Germany) Ruhpolding	4x6 km Relay	Germany Franziska Preuß; Denise Herrmann; Franziska Hildebrand; Laura Dahlmeier	Italy Lisa Vittozzi; Dorothea Wierer; Nicole Gontier; Federica Sanfilippo	Sweden Linn Persson; Mona Brorsson; Anna Magnusson; Hanna Öberg	Detail
OG	22 February 2018	(South Korea) Pyeongchang	4x6 km Relay	Belarus Nadezhda Skardino; Iryna Kryuko; Dzinara Alimbekava; Darya Domracheva	Sweden Linn Persson; Mona Brorsson; Anna Magnusson; Hanna Öberg	France Anaïs Chevalier; Marie Dorin Habert; Justine Braisaz; Anaïs Bescond	Detail
8	17 March 2018	(Norway) Oslo Holmenkollen	4x6 km Relay	France Anaïs Chevalier; Célia Aymonier; Marie Dorin Habert; Anaïs Bescond	Germany Maren Hammerschmidt; Denise Herrmann; Franziska Preuß; Laura Dahlmeier	Italy Lisa Vittozzi; Dorothea Wierer; Nicole Gontier; Federica Sanfilippo	Detail

=== Mixed ===
Stage	Date	Place	Discipline	Winner	Second	Third	Det.
1	26 November 2017	(Sweden) Östersund	1x6 km + 1x7.5 km Single Mixed Relay	Austria Lisa Theresa Hauser; Simon Eder	Germany Vanessa Hinz; Erik Lesser	Kazakhstan Galina Vishnevskaya; Maxim Braun	Detail
1	26 November 2017	(Sweden) Östersund	2x6 km + 2x7.5 km Mixed Relay	Norway Ingrid Landmark Tandrevold; Tiril Eckhoff; Johannes Thingnes Bø; Emil Hegle Svendsen	Italy Lisa Vittozzi; Dorothea Wierer; Dominik Windisch; Lukas Hofer	Germany Franziska Preuß; Maren Hammerschmidt; Benedikt Doll; Arnd Peiffer	Detail
OG	20 February 2018	(South Korea) Pyeongchang	2x6 km + 2x7.5 km Mixed Relay	France Marie Dorin Habert; Anaïs Bescond; Simon Desthieux; Martin Fourcade	Norway Marte Olsbu; Tiril Eckhoff; Johannes Thingnes Bø; Emil Hegle Svendsen	Italy Lisa Vittozzi; Dorothea Wierer; Lukas Hofer; Dominik Windisch	Detail
7	10 March 2018	(Finland) Kontiolahti	1x6 km + 1x7.5 km Single Mixed Relay	France Anaïs Chevalier; Antonin Guigonnat	Austria Lisa Theresa Hauser; Julian Eberhard	Norway Marte Olsbu; Johannes Thingnes Bø	Detail
7	10 March 2018	(Finland) Kontiolahti	2x6 km + 2x7.5 km Mixed Relay	Italy Lisa Vittozzi; Dorothea Wierer; Dominik Windisch; Lukas Hofer	Ukraine Anastasiya Merkushyna; Vita Semerenko; Artem Pryma; Dmytro Pidruchnyi	Norway Synnøve Solemdal; Tiril Eckhoff; Henrik L'Abée-Lund; Tarjei Bø	Detail

== Standings: Men ==
=== Overall ===
Pos.		Points
1.	(France) Martin Fourcade	1116
2.	(Norway) Johannes Thingnes Bø	1027
3.	(Russia) Anton Shipulin	697
4.	(Germany) Arnd Peiffer	668
5.	(Italy) Lukas Hofer	637

- Final standings after 22 races.

=== Individual ===
Pos.		Points
1.	(France) Martin Fourcade	108
1.	(Norway) Johannes Thingnes Bø	108
3.	(France) Quentin Fillon Maillet	75
4.	(Italy) Lukas Hofer	70
5.	(Czech Republic) Ondřej Moravec	65

- Final standings after 2 races.

=== Sprint ===
Pos.		Points
1.	(France) Martin Fourcade	384
2.	(Norway) Johannes Thingnes Bø	382
3.	(Germany) Arnd Peiffer	259
4.	(Russia) Anton Shipulin	256
5.	(Latvia) Andrejs Rastorgujevs	224

- Final standings after 8 races.

=== Pursuit ===
Pos.		Points
1.	(France) Martin Fourcade	396
2.	(Norway) Johannes Thingnes Bø	364
3.	(Russia) Anton Shipulin	254
4.	(Italy) Lukas Hofer	247
5.	(Germany) Arnd Peiffer	227

- Final standings after 7 races.

=== Mass start ===
Pos.		Points
1.	(France) Martin Fourcade	250
2.	(Norway) Johannes Thingnes Bø	222
3.	(Germany) Benedikt Doll	184
4.	(Norway) Tarjei Bø	183
5.	(Russia) Anton Shipulin	174

- Final standings after 5 races.

=== Relay ===
Pos.		Points
1.	Norway	228
2.	Sweden	184
3.	France	180
4.	Germany	175
5.	Russia	173

- Final standings after 4 races.

=== Nation ===
Pos.		Points
1.	Norway	6458
2.	France	6129
3.	Germany	5910
4.	Russia	5623
5.	Italy	5228

- Final standings after 18 races.

== Standings: Women ==
=== Overall ===
Pos.		Points
1.	(Finland) Kaisa Mäkäräinen	822
2.	(Slovakia) Anastasiya Kuzmina	819
3.	(Belarus) Darya Domracheva	804
4.	(Germany) Laura Dahlmeier	730
5.	(Italy) Dorothea Wierer	681

- Final standings after 22 races.

=== Individual ===
Pos.		Points
1.	(Belarus) Nadezhda Skardino	96
2.	(Ukraine) Yuliia Dzhima	91
3.	(Finland) Kaisa Mäkäräinen	84
4.	(Ukraine) Valj Semerenko	83
5.	(Belarus) Darya Domracheva	65

- Final standings after 2 races.

=== Sprint ===
Pos.		Points
1.	(Slovakia) Anastasiya Kuzmina	323
2.	(Belarus) Darya Domracheva	313
3.	(Finland) Kaisa Mäkäräinen	258
4.	(Germany) Laura Dahlmeier	252
5.	(Czech Republic) Veronika Vítková	245

- Final standings after 8 races.

=== Pursuit ===
Pos.		Points
1.	(Slovakia) Anastasiya Kuzmina	301
2.	(Finland) Kaisa Mäkäräinen	280
3.	(Germany) Laura Dahlmeier	271
4.	(Italy) Dorothea Wierer	264
5.	(Belarus) Darya Domracheva	237

- Final standings after 7 races.

=== Mass start ===
Pos.		Points
1.	(Finland) Kaisa Mäkäräinen	216
2.	(Germany) Laura Dahlmeier	207
3.	(Germany) Vanessa Hinz	195
4.	(Belarus) Darya Domracheva	189
5.	(France) Anaïs Chevalier	176

- Final standings after 5 races.

=== Relay ===
Pos.		Points
1.	Germany	228
2.	France	200
3.	Italy	169
4.	Sweden	168
5.	Ukraine	158

- Final standings after 4 races.

=== Nation ===
Pos.		Points
1.	Germany	6179
2.	France	5887
3.	Italy	5407
4.	Russia	5237
5.	Norway	5232

- Final standings after 18 races.

== Standings: Mixed ==
=== Mixed relay ===
Pos.		Points
1.	Italy	188
2.	Norway	188
3.	France	179
4.	Austria	171
5.	Germany	168

- Final standings after 4 races.

== Medal table ==
Rank	Nation	Gold	Silver	Bronze	Total
1	Norway	15	8	11	34
2	France	13	14	11	38
3	Germany	7	8	6	21
4	Belarus	7	2	2	11
5	Slovakia	5	5	0	10
6	Italy	2	7	5	14
7	Finland	2	4	1	7
8	Austria	2	2	0	4
9	Russia	2	0	5	7
10	Sweden	1	0	3	4
11	Ukraine	0	2	5	7
12	Slovenia	0	2	1	3
13	Czech Republic	0	1	3	4
14	Latvia	0	1	0	1
15	Canada	0	0	1	1
15	Kazakhstan	0	0	1	1
15	United States	0	0	1	1
Totals (17 entries)		56	56	56	168

== Achievements ==
First World Cup career victory

Men

- Henrik L'Abée-Lund (NOR), 31, in his 8th season — Stage 8 Sprint in Oslo Holmenkollen; first podium was 2012–13 Sprint in Sochi
- Maxim Tsvetkov (RUS), 26, in his 6th season — Stage 9 Mass start in Tyumen; first podium was 2015–16 Sprint in Antholz–Anterselva

Women

- Nadezhda Skardino (BLR), 32, in her 9th season — Stage 1 Individual in Östersund; first podium was 2012–13 Sprint in Pokljuka
- Denise Herrmann (GER), 28, in her 2nd season — Stage 1 Sprint in Östersund; it was also her first podium
- Justine Braisaz (FRA), 21, in her 4th season — Stage 3 Mass start in Le Grand-Bornand; first podium was 2016–17 Pursuit in Pokljuka
- Vanessa Hinz (GER), 25, in her 6th season — Stage 7 Mass start in Kontiolahti; it was also her first podium

First World Cup podium

Men

- Antonin Guigonnat (FRA), 26, in his 5th season — no. 3 in the Stage 3 Sprint in Le Grand-Bornand
- Erlend Bjøntegaard (NOR), 27, in his 6th season — no. 3 in the Stage 6 Mass start in Anterselva
- Simon Desthieux (FRA), 26, in his 6th season — no. 2 in the Stage 9 Sprint in Tyumen

Women

- Iryna Kryuko (BLR), 26, in her 7th season — no. 2 in the Stage 3 Mass start in Le Grand-Bornand
- Rosanna Crawford (CAN), 29, in her 9th season — no. 3 in the Stage 5 Individual in Ruhpolding
- Paulína Fialková (SVK), 25, in her 7th season — no. 2 in the Stage 9 Mass start in Tyumen

Victory in this World Cup (all-time number of victories in parentheses)

Men

- Martin Fourcade (FRA), 9 (70) first places
- Johannes Thingnes Bø (NOR), 8 (21) first places
- Anton Shipulin (RUS), 1 (11) first place
- Tarjei Bø (NOR), 1 (9) first place
- Julian Eberhard (AUT), 1 (4) first place
- Henrik L'Abée-Lund (NOR), 1 (1) first place
- Maxim Tsvetkov (RUS), 1 (1) first place

Women

- Darya Domracheva (BLR), 6 (31) first places
- Anastasiya Kuzmina (SVK), 5 (11) first places
- Kaisa Mäkäräinen (FIN), 2 (23) first place
- Laura Dahlmeier (GER), 2 (19) first places
- Denise Herrmann (GER), 2 (2) first places
- Tiril Eckhoff (NOR), 1 (5) first place
- Dorothea Wierer (ITA), 1 (4) first place
- Nadezhda Skardino (BLR), 1 (1) first place
- Justine Braisaz (FRA), 1 (1) first place
- Vanessa Hinz (GER), 1 (1) first place

== Retirements ==
The following notable biathletes retired during or after the 2017–18 season:

Men

- Fabian Hoerl (AUT)
- Jaroslav Soukup (CZE)
- Jan Treier (EST)
- Jean-Guillaume Béatrix (FRA)
- Scott Dixon (GBR)
- Matthias Bischl (GER)
- Florian Graf (GER)
- Michael Willeitner (GER)
- Yuki Nakajima (JPN)
- Junji Nagai (JPN)
- Vassiliy Podkorytov (KAZ)
- Alexandr Trifonov (KAZ)
- Kim Jong-min (ROK)
- Rokas Suslavičius (LTU)
- Ole Einar Bjørndalen (NOR)
- Vegard Gjermundshaug (NOR)
- Fredrik Roervik (NOR)
- Kristoffer Skjelvik (NOR)
- Emil Hegle Svendsen (NOR)
- Alexandr Pechenkin (RUS)
- Michal Kubaliak (SVK)
- Tiio Söderhielm (SWE)
- Lowell Bailey (USA)
- Tim Burke (USA)
- Russell Currier (USA)

Women

- Susanna Kurzthaler (AUT)
- Darya Domracheva (BLR)
- Nadzeya Pisarava (BLR)
- Nadezhda Skardino (BLR)
- Julia Ransom (CAN)
- Lea Johannidesova (CZE)
- Veronika Zvařičová (CZE)
- Lena Arnaud (FRA)
- Marie Dorin Habert (FRA)
- Coline Varcin (FRA)
- Auli Kiskola (FIN)
- Emőke Szőcs (HUN)
- Karin Oberhofer (ITA)
- Rina Mitsuhashi (JPN)
- Lyubov Filimonova (KAZ)
- Anna Kistanova (KAZ)
- Natalija Paulauskaitė (LTU)
- Kaia Wøien Nicolaisen (NOR)
- Weronika Nowakowska (POL)
- Florina Ioana Cristea (ROM)
- Reka Forika (ROM)
- Luminita Piscoran (ROM)
- Éva Tófalvi (ROM)
- Anna Eliseeva (RUS)
- Anastasia Evsyunina (RUS)
- Olga Iakushova (RUS)
- Irina Uslugina (RUS)
- Anastasia Zagoruiko (RUS)
- Anja Eržen (SLO)
- Kim Adolfsson (SWE)
- Olga Alifiravets (SWE)
- Mariya Panfilova (UKR)
