= 2017–18 Biathlon World Cup – Mass start Women =

The 2017–18 Biathlon World Cup – Mass start Women ran from Sunday 17 December 2017 in Annecy to Sunday 25 March 2018 in Tyumen. The defending titlist was Gabriela Koukalová of the Czech Republic.

== Competition format ==
In the mass start, all biathletes start at the same time and the first across the finish line wins. In this 12.5 kilometres (7.8 mi) competition, the distance is skied over five laps; there are four bouts of shooting (two prone and two standing, in that order) with the first shooting bout being at the lane corresponding to the competitor's bib number (bib #10 shoots at lane #10 regardless of position in race), with the rest of the shooting bouts being on a first-come, first-served basis (if a competitor arrives at the lane in fifth place, they shoot at lane 5). As in the sprint and pursuit, competitors must ski one 150 metres (490 ft) penalty loop for each miss. Here again, to avoid unwanted congestion, World Cup Mass starts are held with only the 30 top ranking athletes on the start line (half that of the pursuit) as here all contestants start simultaneously.

== 2016–17 Top 3 standings ==
Medal	Athlete	Points
Gold:	(Czech Republic) Gabriela Koukalová	265
Silver:	(Germany) Laura Dahlmeier	254
Bronze:	(Finland) Kaisa Mäkäräinen	207

== Medal winners ==
Event	Gold	Time	Silver	Time	Bronze	Time
Annecy details	Justine Braisaz; France	37:19.4 (0+0+1+0)	Iryna Kryuko; Belarus	37:30.6 (0+0+0+0)	Laura Dahlmeier; Germany	37:39.3 (0+1+0+1)
Ruhpolding details	Kaisa Mäkäräinen; Finland	34:05.6 (1+0+0+1)	Laura Dahlmeier; Germany	34:06.4 (1+0+0+1)	Veronika Vítková; Czech Republic	34:10.2 (1+0+1+0)
Antholz-Anterselva details	Darya Domracheva; Belarus	40:23.9 (1+0+0+0)	Anastasiya Kuzmina; Slovakia	40:35.8 (1+1+0+1)	Kaisa Mäkäräinen; Finland	40:40.1 (1+0+2+1)
Kontiolahti details	Vanessa Hinz; Germany	35:47.9 (0+0+0+0)	Lisa Vittozzi; Italy	36:01.4 (0+0+0+1)	Anaïs Chevalier; France	36:04.7 (0+0+0+1)
Tyumen details	Darya Domracheva; Belarus	35:27.4 (0+0+1+0)	Paulína Fialková; Slovakia	35:29.2 (1+0+0+0)	Anaïs Chevalier; France	35:34.0 (0+0+0+0)

== Standings ==
#	Name	ANN	RUH	ANT	KON	TYU	Total
1	Kaisa Mäkäräinen (FIN)	27	60	48	43	38	216
2	Laura Dahlmeier (GER)	48	54	40	36	29	207
3	Vanessa Hinz (GER)	40	20	32	60	43	195
4	Darya Domracheva (BLR)	—	38	60	31	60	189
5	Anaïs Chevalier (FRA)	38	32	10	48	48	176
6	Anastasiya Kuzmina (SVK)	43	16	54	25	30	168
7	Iryna Kryuko (BLR)	54	27	29	34	14	158
8	Marte Olsbu (NOR)	30	26	43	38	21	158
9	Maren Hammerschmidt (GER)	20	30	38	30	24	142
10	Franziska Hildebrand (GER)	31	22	26	26	27	132
11	Dorothea Wierer (ITA)	32	21	36	20	22	131
12	Lisa Vittozzi (ITA)	4	36	25	54	6	125
13	Ekaterina Yurlova-Percht (RUS)	34	18	31	22	18	123
14	Anaïs Bescond (FRA)	28	24	14	29	28	123
15	Denise Herrmann (GER)	29	40	20	—	23	112
16	Valj Semerenko (UKR)	26	28	30	18	—	102
17	Vita Semerenko (UKR)	24	31	18	24	—	97
18	Veronika Vítková (CZE)	16	48	8	21	—	93
19	Yuliia Dzhima (UKR)	36	26	6	27	—	92
20	Justine Braisaz (FRA)	60	8	21	—	—	89
21	Paulína Fialková (SVK)	—	—	28	—	54	82
22	Nadezhda Skardino (BLR)	—	25	—	32	25	82
23	Celia Aymonier (FRA)	25	6	27	14	10	82
24	Selina Gasparin (SUI)	22	34	12	8	—	76
25	Franziska Preuß (GER)	—	—	34	—	40	74
26	Rosanna Crawford (CAN)	—	43	—	28	—	71
27	Tiril Eckhoff (NOR)	—	—	22	—	36	58
28	Synnøve Solemdal (NOR)	—	14	24	6	2	46
29	Anna Frolina (KOR)	—	—	—	12	31	43
30	Marie Dorin Habert (FRA)	18	—	—	23	—	41
#	Name	ANN	RUH	ANT	KON	TYU	Total
31	Hanna Öberg (SWE)	—	—	—	40	—	40
32	Weronika Nowakowska-Ziemniak (POL)	10	12	4	10	4	40
33	Karolin Horchler (GER)	—	—	—	—	34	34
34	Fuyuko Tachizaki (JPN)	—	—	—	—	32	32
35	Galina Vishnevskaya (KAZ)	—	—	16	4	12	32
36	Anastasiya Merkushyna (UKR)	—	29	—	—	—	29
37	Lisa Theresa Hauser (AUT)	—	—	—	—	26	26
38	Daria Virolainen (RUS)	—	10	—	—	16	26
39	Tatiana Akimova (RUS)	23	—	2	—	—	25
40	Nicole Gontier (ITA)	—	—	23	—	—	23
41	Susan Dunklee (USA)	21	—	—	—	—	21
42	Irina Uslugina (RUS)	—	—	—	—	20	20
43	Clare Egan (USA)	—	—	—	16	—	16
44	Mari Laukkanen (FIN)	14	—	—	—	—	14
45	Federica Sanfilippo (ITA)	12	—	—	—	—	12
46	Krystyna Guzik (POL)	8	—	—	—	—	8
46	Lena Häcki (SUI)	—	—	—	—	8	8
48	Emma Lunder (CAN)	6	—	—	—	—	6
49	Baiba Bendika (LAT)	—	4	—	—	—	4
50	Eva Puskarčíková (CZE)	2	2	—	—	—	4
51	Ivona Fialková (SVK)	—	—	—	2	—	2
