= 2017–18 Biathlon World Cup – Relay Women =

The 2017–18 Biathlon World Cup – Relay Women started on Sunday 10 December 2017 in Hochfilzen and will finish on Saturday 17 March 2018 in Oslo Holmenkollen. The defending team is Germany.

== Competition format ==
The relay teams consist of four biathletes. Every athlete's leg is skied over three 2 kilometres (1.2 mi) laps for a total of 6 kilometres (3.7 mi), with two shooting rounds: one prone and one standing. For every round of five targets there are eight bullets available, though the last three can only be single-loaded manually from the spare round holders or from bullets deposited by the athlete into trays or onto the mat at the firing line. If after eight bullets there are still standing targets, one 150 metres (490 ft) penalty loop must be taken for each remaining target. The first-leg participants start all at the same time, and as in cross-country skiing relays, every athlete of a team must touch the team's next-leg participant to perform a valid changeover. On the first shooting stage of the first leg, the participant must shoot in the lane corresponding to their bib number (bib #10 shoots at lane #10 regardless of their position in the race), then for the remainder of the relay, the athletes shoot at the lane corresponding to the position they arrived (arrive at the range in 5th place, shoot at lane five).

== 2016–17 Top 3 standings ==
Medal	Nation	Points
Gold:	Germany	300
Silver:	France	248
Bronze:	Ukraine	224

== Medal winners ==
Event	Gold	Time	Silver	Time	Bronze	Time
Hochfilzen details	Germany Vanessa Hinz; Franziska Hildebrand; Maren Hammerschmidt; Laura Dahlmeier	1:14:36.4 (0+1) (0+1) (0+2) (0+2) (0+1) (0+0) (0+1) (0+1)	Ukraine Vita Semerenko; Yuliia Dzhima; Valentyna Semerenko; Olena Pidhrushna	1:15:21.3 (0+1) (0+0) (0+0) (0+0) (0+1) (0+1) (0+1) (0+1)	France Marie Dorin Habert; Célia Aymonier; Justine Braisaz; Anaïs Bescond	1:15:40.9 (0+1) (2+3) (0+2) (0+2) (0+2) (0+1) (0+1) (0+1)
Oberhof details	France Anaïs Bescond; Anaïs Chevalier; Célia Aymonier; Justine Braisaz	1:12:42.4 (0+1) (0+0) (1+3) (0+0) (0+0) (0+2) (0+1) (0+3)	Germany Vanessa Hinz; Denise Herrmann; Franziska Preuß; Maren Hammerschmidt	1:13:14.8 (0+3) (1+3) (0+2) (0+0) (0+0) (0+0) (0+2) (1+3)	Sweden Linn Persson; Anna Magnusson; Elisabeth Högberg; Mona Brorsson	1:13:30.6 (0+2) (0+0) (0+0) (0+2) (0+0) (0+1) (0+2) (0+1)
Ruhpolding details	Germany Franziska Preuß; Denise Herrmann; Franziska Hildebrand; Laura Dahlmeier	1:08:47.0 (0+0) (0+0) (0+0) (0+2) (0+3) (0+1) (0+1) (0+2)	Italy Lisa Vittozzi; Dorothea Wierer; Nicole Gontier; Federica Sanfilippo	1:08:49.9 (0+0) (0+0) (0+0) (0+0) (0+1) (0+2) (0+0) (0+0)	Sweden Linn Persson; Mona Brorsson; Anna Magnusson; Hanna Öberg	1:09:04.2 (0+0) (0+1) (0+0) (0+1) (0+0) (0+1) (0+1) (0+1)
Oslo Holmenkollen details	align="right"| 1:10:58.3 (0+0) (0+2) (0+0) (0+1) (0+1) (0+1) (0+0) (0+1)	align="right"| 1:11:12.7 (0+0) (0+2) (0+1) (0+2) (0+1) (0+1) (0+0) (0+0)	align="right"| 1:11:31.5 (0+1) (0+2) (0+0) (0+0) (0+1) (0+1) (0+1) (0+2)			

== Standings ==
#	Nation	HOC	OBE	RUH	OSL	Total
1	Germany	60	54	60	54	228
2	France	48	60	32	60	200
3	Italy	29	38	54	48	169
4	Sweden	34	48	48	48	168
5	Ukraine	54	40	30	34	158
6	Russia	43	43	36	32	154
7	Norway	28	31	43	43	145
8	Switzerland	40	28	34	40	142
9	Poland	27	34	40	36	137
10	Czech Republic	38	32	38	28	136
11	Belarus	36	26	28	31	121
12	Canada	32	27	31	30	120
13	Finland	25	36	21	29	111
14	Japan	31	30	25	23	109
15	Kazakhstan	30	21	27	24	102
16	South Korea	26	24	18	25	93
17	Estonia	21	25	20	22	88
17	Bulgaria	23	23	19	21	86
19	Austria	DNS	29	26	27	82
20	Lithuania	22	—	23	20	65
21	Slovakia	24	—	29	—	53
22	United States	—	—	24	26	50
23	China	—	22	22	DSQ	44
