= 2017–18 Biathlon World Cup – Individual Men =

The 2017–18 Biathlon World Cup – Individual Men started on Thursday 30 November 2017 in Östersund and finished on Wednesday 10 January 2018 in Ruhpolding. The defending titlist was Martin Fourcade of France.

The small crystal globe winner for the category was tied between Johannes Thingnes Bø of Norway and Martin Fourcade of France.

== Competition format ==
The 20 kilometres (12 mi) individual race is the oldest biathlon event; the distance is skied over five laps. The biathlete shoots four times at any shooting lane, in the order of prone, standing, prone, standing, totalling 20 targets. For each missed target a fixed penalty time, usually one minute, is added to the skiing time of the biathlete. Competitors' starts are staggered, normally by 30 seconds.

== 2016–17 Top 3 standings ==
Medal	Athlete	Points
Gold:	(France) Martin Fourcade	162
Silver:	(Russia) Anton Shipulin	126
Bronze:	(United States) Lowell Bailey	117

== Medal winners ==
Event	Gold	Time	Silver	Time	Bronze	Time
Östersund details	Johannes Thingnes Bø; Norway	53:24.5 (0+0+0+0)	Quentin Fillon Maillet; France	55:25.5 (0+0+0+0)	Martin Fourcade; France	55:38.8 (0+0+0+2)
Ruhpolding details	Martin Fourcade; France	44:27.9 (0+0+0+1)	Ondřej Moravec; Czech Republic	45:28.9 (0+0+0+0)	Johannes Thingnes Bø; Norway	45:34.2 (0+0+0+1)

== Standings ==
#	Name	ÖST	RUH	Total
1	Johannes Thingnes Bø (NOR)	60	48	108
1	Martin Fourcade (FRA)	48	60	108
3	Quentin Fillon Maillet (FRA)	54	21	75
4	Lukas Hofer (ITA)	38	32	70
5	Ondřej Moravec (CZE)	11	54	65
6	Andrejs Rastorgujevs (LAT)	34	26	60
7	Simon Eder (AUT)	22	36	58
8	Jakov Fak (SLO)	29	27	56
9	Simon Schempp (GER)	25	28	53
10	Simon Desthieux (FRA)	28	22	50
11	Michal Šlesingr (CZE)	15	34	49
12	Julian Eberhard (AUT)	43	0	43
13	Roman Rees (GER)	—	43	43
14	Arnd Peiffer (GER)	12	30	42
15	Emil Hegle Svendsen (NOR)	30	11	41
16	Michal Krčmář (CZE)	0	40	40
17	Anton Babikov (RUS)	40	—	40
18	Dominik Landertinger (AUT)	—	38	38
19	Benjamin Weger (SUI)	36	—	36
20	Henrik L'Abée-Lund (NOR)	19	17	36
21	Artem Pryma (UKR)	18	15	33
22	Alexandr Loginov (RUS)	32	0	32
23	Krasimir Anev (BUL)	0	31	31
24	Klemen Bauer (SLO)	31	—	31
25	Antonin Guigonnat (FRA)	—	30	30
26	Lars Helge Birkeland (NOR)	27	—	27
27	Anton Shipulin (RUS)	26	0	26
28	Benedikt Doll (GER)	7	19	26
29	Johannes Kühn (GER)	0	25	25
30	Miha Dovzan (SLO)	0	24	24
#	Name	ÖST	RUH	Total
31	Erik Lesser (GER)	24	0	24
32	Ole Einar Bjørndalen (NOR)	23	0	23
33	Matej Kazár (SVK)	0	23	23
34	Alexey Volkov (RUS)	8	14	22
35	Tarjei Bø (NOR)	21	—	21
36	Erlend Bjøntegaard (NOR)	—	20	20
36	Maxim Tsvetkov (RUS)	20	—	20
38	Fredrik Lindström (SWE)	16	3	19
39	Sergey Bocharnikov (BLR)	0	18	18
40	Serhiy Semenov (UKR)	17	—	17
41	Florent Claude (BEL)	—	16	16
42	Simon Fourcade (FRA)	14	0	14
43	Tim Burke (USA)	9	5	14
44	Serafin Wiestner (SUI)	0	13	13
45	Felix Leitner (AUT)	13	—	13
46	Dominik Windisch (ITA)	1	12	13
47	Sean Doherty (USA)	3	10	13
48	Jean-Guillaume Béatrix (FRA)	10	—	10
49	Olli Hiidensalo (FIN)	0	9	9
50	Thomas Bormolini (ITA)	0	8	8
51	Christian Gow (CAN)	0	7	7
52	Emilien Jacquelin (FRA)	6	0	6
53	Vetle Sjåstad Christiansen (NOR)	—	6	6
54	Torstein Stenersen (SWE)	5	0	5
55	Lowell Bailey (USA)	0	4	4
56	Nathan Smith (CAN)	4	—	4
57	George Buta (ROU)	2	0	2
58	Sebastian Samuelsson (SWE)	—	2	2
59	Vladimir Iliev (BUL)	0	1	1
