= 2017–18 Biathlon World Cup – Mixed Relay =

The 2017–18 Biathlon World Cup – Mixed Relay started on Sunday 26 November 2017 in Östersund and finished on Saturday 10 March 2018 in Kontiolahti. The defending team was Germany.

The winning team was Italy.

== Competition format ==
The relay teams consist of four biathletes. Legs 1 and 2 are skied by the women, and legs 3 and 4 by the men. The women's legs are 6 kilometres (3.7 mi) and men's legs are 7.5 kilometres (4.7 mi). Every athlete's leg is skied over three laps, with two shooting rounds: one prone and one standing. For every round of five targets there are eight bullets available, though the last three can only be single-loaded manually from the spare round holders or from bullets deposited by the athlete into trays or onto the mat at the firing line. If after eight bullets there are still standing targets, one 150 metres (490 ft) penalty loop must be taken for each remaining target. The first-leg participants all start at the same time, and as in cross-country skiing relays, every athlete of a team must touch the team's next-leg participant to perform a valid changeover. On the first shooting stage of the first leg, the participant must shoot in the lane corresponding to their bib number (bib #10 shoots at lane #10 regardless of their position in the race), then for the remainder of the relay, the athletes shoot at the lane corresponding to the position they arrived (arrive at the range in 5th place, shoot at lane five).

The single mixed relay involves one male and one female biathlete each completing two legs consisting of one prone and one standing shoot. The female biathletes all start the race at the same time and complete one 6 kilometres (3.7 mi) leg before exchanging with their male counterparts who complete one 7.5 kilometres (4.7 mi) leg before exchanging again with the female skier who after completing another leg switches again with the male biathlete who completes the race. The rules regarding shooting are the same as in the regular mixed relay.

== 2016–17 Top 3 standings ==
Medal	Nation	Points
Gold:	Germany	264
Silver:	France	257
Bronze:	Austria	201

== Medal winners ==
Event	Gold	Time	Silver	Time	Bronze	Time
Östersund (SR) details	Austria Lisa Theresa Hauser; Simon Eder	36:17.0 (0+0) (0+1) (0+0) (0+0) (0+1) (0+0) (0+0) (0+0)	Germany Vanessa Hinz; Erik Lesser	36:33.5 (0+0) (0+1) (0+1) (0+2) (0+2) (0+1) (0+1) (0+1)	Kazakhstan Galina Vishnevskaya; Maxim Braun	36:49.7 (0+1) (0+0) (0+2) (0+2) (0+0) (0+0) (0+0) (0+0)
Östersund (MR) details	Norway Ingrid Landmark Tandrevold; Tiril Eckhoff; Johannes Thingnes Bø; Emil Hegle Svendsen	1:11:31.7 (0+0) (0+2) (0+1) (0+2) (0+2) (0+3) (0+0) (0+3)	Italy Lisa Vittozzi; Dorothea Wierer; Dominik Windisch; Lukas Hofer	1:11:37.0 (0+0) (0+0) (0+0) (0+2) (0+0) (0+0) (1+3) (0+1)	Germany Franziska Preuß; Maren Hammerschmidt; Benedikt Doll; Arnd Peiffer	1:11:38.1 (0+1) (0+1) (0+1) (0+1) (0+3) (0+1) (0+1) (0+1)
Kontiolahti (SR) details	France Anaïs Chevalier; Antonin Guigonnat	33:29.1 (0+1) (0+2) (0+1) (0+0) (0+0) (0+0) (0+2) (0+0)	Austria Lisa Theresa Hauser; Julian Eberhard	33:31.5 (0+2) (0+1) (0+1) (0+0) (0+0) (0+1) (0+2) (0+0)	Norway Marte Olsbu Røiseland; Johannes Thingnes Bø	33:33.5 (0+2) (0+2) (0+0) (0+1) (1+3) (0+0) (0+2) (0+1)
Kontiolahti (MR) details	Italy Dorothea Wierer; Lisa Vittozzi; Dominik Windisch; Lukas Hofer	1:15:08.3 (0+3) (0+3) (0+1) (1+3) (0+2) (0+0) (0+0) (0+1)	Ukraine Anastasiya Merkushyna; Vita Semerenko; Artem Pryma; Dmytro Pidruchnyi	1:15:09.8 (0+0) (0+0) (0+1) (0+0) (0+1) (0+0) (0+0) (0+1)	Norway Synnøve Solemdal; Tiril Eckhoff; Henrik L'Abée-Lund; Tarjei Bø	1:15:17.4 (0+1) (0+2) (0+1) (0+3) (0+1) (0+0) (0+0) (0+1)

== Standings ==
#	Nation	ÖST SR	ÖST MR	KON SR	KON MR	Total
1	Italy	36	54	38	60	188
2	Norway	32	60	48	48	188
3	France	43	36	60	40	179
4	Austria	60	23	54	34	171
5	Germany	54	48	30	36	168
6	Ukraine	38	31	43	54	166
7	Russia	34	38	40	43	155
8	Sweden	40	40	31	38	149
9	Slovakia	28	43	29	31	131
10	Belarus	30	30	21	30	111
11	Kazakhstan	48	DSQ	32	29	109
12	Japan	29	21	34	25	109
13	Czech Republic	31	28	23	27	109
14	Canada	19	26	36	24	105
15	Finland	20	34	22	28	104
16	Switzerland	24	32	26	22	104
17	United States	22	20	27	32	101
18	Estonia	26	18	25	26	95
19	South Korea	25	22	28	18	93
20	Poland	27	27	19	19	92
21	Bulgaria	23	25	17	23	88
22	Lithuania	21	24	16	21	82
23	Slovenia	—	29	24	20	73
24	Romania	18	19	18	—	55
25	Latvia	—	—	20	—	20
26	Great Britain	—	—	15	—	15
