= 2017–18 Biathlon World Cup – Individual Women =

The 2017–18 Biathlon World Cup – Individual Women started on Wednesday 29 November 2017 in Östersund and finished on Thursday 11 January 2018 in Ruhpolding. The defending titlist was Laura Dahlmeier of Germany.

The small crystal globe winner for the category was Nadezhda Skardino of Belarus.

== Competition format ==
The 15 kilometres (9.3 mi) individual race is the oldest biathlon event; the distance is skied over five laps. The biathlete shoots four times at any shooting lane, in the order of prone, standing, prone, standing, totalling 20 targets. For each missed target a fixed penalty time, usually one minute, is added to the skiing time of the biathlete. Competitors' starts are staggered, normally by 30 seconds.

== 2016–17 Top 3 standings ==
Medal	Athlete	Points
Gold:	(Germany) Laura Dahlmeier	180
Silver:	(Germany) Vanessa Hinz	103
Bronze:	(Italy) Alexia Runggaldier	96

== Medal winners ==
Event	Gold	Time	Silver	Time	Bronze	Time
Östersund details	Nadezhda Skardino; Belarus	42:57.4 (0+0+0+0)	Synnøve Solemdal; Norway	43:00.3 (0+0+0+0)	Yuliia Dzhima; Ukraine	43:09.4 (0+0+0+0)
Ruhpolding details	Dorothea Wierer; Italy	41:29.0 (0+0+0+0)	Kaisa Mäkäräinen; Finland	41:41.7 (1+0+0+0)	Rosanna Crawford; Canada	41:50.2 (0+0+0+0)

== Standings ==
#	Name	ÖST	RUH	Total
1	Nadezhda Skardino (BLR)	60	36	96
2	Yuliia Dzhima (UKR)	48	43	91
3	Kaisa Mäkäräinen (FIN)	30	54	84
4	Valj Semerenko (UKR)	43	40	83
5	Darya Domracheva (BLR)	27	38	65
6	Dorothea Wierer (ITA)	0	60	60
7	Veronika Vítková (CZE)	29	29	58
8	Synnøve Solemdal (NOR)	54	0	54
9	Eva Puskarčíková (CZE)	36	18	54
10	Franziska Hildebrand (GER)	28	24	52
11	Anaïs Bescond (FRA)	17	34	51
12	Rosanna Crawford (CAN)	2	48	50
13	Mona Brorsson (SWE)	38	12	50
14	Marte Olsbu (NOR)	31	15	46
15	Paulína Fialková (SVK)	40	4	44
16	Baiba Bendika (LAT)	12	31	43
17	Linn Persson (SWE)	26	17	43
18	Lisa Vittozzi (ITA)	20	23	43
19	Julia Ransom (CAN)	32	7	39
20	Justine Braisaz (FRA)	34	DNS	34
21	Iryna Kryuko (BLR)	3	30	33
22	Anastasiya Kuzmina (SVK)	—	32	32
23	Maren Hammerschmidt (GER)	6	26	32
24	Iryna Varvynets (UKR)	13	19	32
25	Weronika Nowakowska (POL)	0	28	28
26	Anaïs Chevalier (FRA)	0	27	27
27	Anastasiya Merkushyna (UKR)	4	22	26
28	Selina Gasparin (SUI)	25	0	25
29	Daria Virolaynen (RUS)	0	25	25
30	Lisa Theresa Hauser (AUT)	24	0	24
#	Name	ÖST	RUH	Total
31	Mari Laukkanen (FIN)	23	—	23
32	Karolin Horchler (GER)	22	—	22
33	Galina Vishnevskaya (KAZ)	21	0	21
34	Chloé Chevalier (FRA)	—	21	21
35	Ingrid Landmark Tandrevold (NOR)	10	11	21
36	Tatiana Akimova (RUS)	0	20	20
37	Olga Poltoranina (KAZ)	7	13	20
38	Franziska Preuß (GER)	11	9	20
39	Tiril Eckhoff (NOR)	19	0	19
40	Denise Herrmann (GER)	18	1	19
41	Elisa Gasparin (SUI)	0	16	16
42	Hanna Öberg (SWE)	16	—	16
43	Victoria Slivko (RUS)	14	2	16
44	Célia Aymonier (FRA)	15	DNF	15
45	Susan Dunklee (USA)	0	14	14
46	Vanessa Hinz (GER)	0	10	10
47	Amanda Lightfoot (GBR)	10	0	10
48	Veronika Zvařičová (CZE)	—	9	9
49	Ekaterina Yurlova-Percht (RUS)	8	—	8
50	Dzinara Alimbekava (BLR)	—	6	6
51	Emma Nilsson (SWE)	0	5	5
52	Darya Yurkevich (BLR)	5	0	5
53	Irina Uslugina (RUS)	—	3	3
54	Vita Semerenko (UKR)	1	—	1
