= Auli Kiskola =

Finnish biathlete

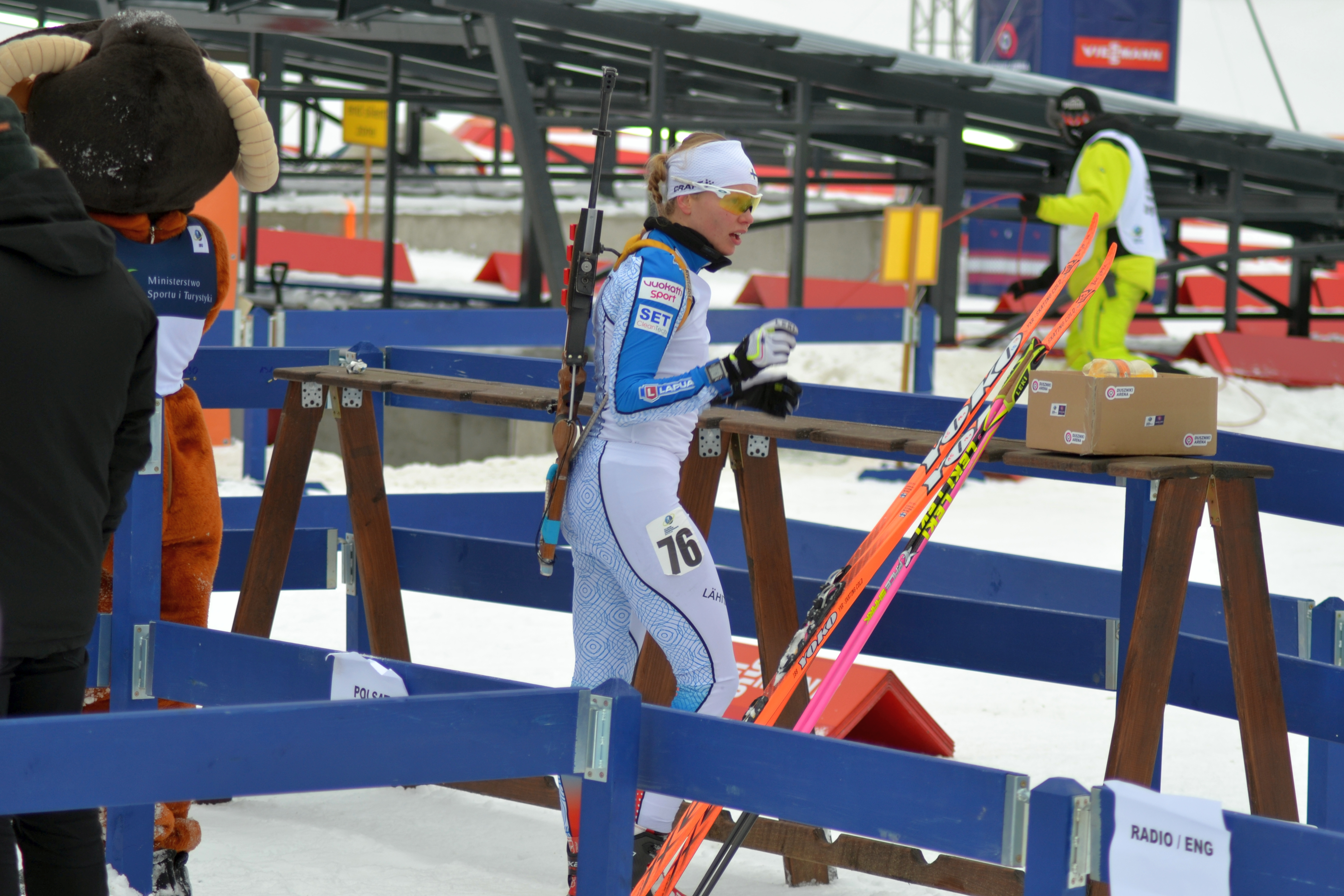
- Biathlon European Championships 2017 Individual Women

Personal information
- Nationality: Finnish
- Born: 12 February 1995 (age 30)

Sport
- Country: Finland
- Sport: Biathlon

Auli Kiskola (born 12 February 1995) is a Finnish biathlete. She represented Finland at the Junior World championships in 2012, 2013 and 2015, and at the Biathlon World Championships 2015 in Kontiolahti.
