= 2017–18 Biathlon World Cup – Stage 8 =

2017–18 Biathlon World Cup – Holmenkollen

The 2017–18 Biathlon World Cup – Stage 8 was the 8th event of the season and was held in Oslo, Holmenkollen, Norway, from 15 March until 18 March 2018.

== Schedule of events ==
Date	Time	Events
March 15	12:00 CET	Men's 10 km Sprint
March 15	14:45 CET	Women's 7.5 km Sprint
March 17	12:30 CET	Women's 4 × 6 km Relay
March 17	15:15 CET	Men's 12.5 km Pursuit
March 18	12:00 CET	Women's 10 km Pursuit
March 18	14:45 CET	Men's + 4 × 7.5 km Relay

== Medal winners ==
=== Men ===
Event:	Gold:	Time	Silver:	Time	Bronze:	Time
10 km Sprint details	Henrik L'Abée-Lund; Norway	26:10.3 (0+0)	Johannes Thingnes Bø; Norway	26:16.4 (0+1)	Martin Fourcade; France	26:17.2 (0+0)
10 km Pursuit details	Martin Fourcade; France	31:31.6 (1+0+1+0)	Lukas Hofer; Italy	31:49.7 (1+0+0+0)	Johannes Thingnes Bø; Norway	32:04.1 (1+2+0+1)
4 x 7,5 km Men Relay details	Norway; Lars Helge Birkeland; Henrik L'Abée-Lund; Tarjei Bø; Johannes Thingnes Bø	1:13:13.7 (0+0) (0+0) (0+2) (0+0) (0+1) (0+0) (0+0) (0+0)	Austria; Dominik Landertinger; Felix Leitner; Simon Eder; Julian Eberhard	1:14:04.0 (0+0) (0+2) (0+1) (0+1) (0+0) (0+1) (0+0) (0+0)	Russia; Maxim Tsvetkov; Anton Babikov; Dmitry Malyshko; Anton Shipulin	1:14:10.6 (0+0) (0+0) (0+0) (0+1) (0+2) (0+0) (0+0) (0+1)

=== Women ===
Event:	Gold:	Time	Silver:	Time	Bronze:	Time
7.5 km Sprint details	Anastasiya Kuzmina; Slovakia	21:31.8 (1+0)	Darya Domracheva; Belarus	21:40.7 (0+0)	Yuliia Dzhima; Ukraine	22:01.0 (0+0)
10 km Pursuit details	Darya Domracheva; Belarus	30:37.4 (1+0+1+0)	Anastasiya Kuzmina; Slovakia	30:46.6 (0+2+2+0)	Susan Dunklee; United States	31:06.9 (1+0+1+0)
4 x 6 km Women Relay details	France; Anaïs Chevalier; Célia Aymonier; Marie Dorin Habert; Anaïs Bescond	1:10:58.3 (0+0) (0+2) (0+0) (0+1) (0+1) (0+1) (0+0) (0+1)	Germany; Maren Hammerschmidt; Denise Herrmann; Franziska Preuß; Laura Dahlmeier	1:11:12.7 (0+0) (0+2) (0+1) (0+2) (0+1) (0+1) (0+0) (0+0)	Italy; Lisa Vittozzi; Dorothea Wierer; Nicole Gontier; Federica Sanfilippo	1:11:31.5 (0+1) (0+2) (0+0) (0+0) (0+1) (0+1) (0+1) (0+2)

== Achievements ==
Best performance for all time

- Henrik L'Abée-Lund (NOR), 1st place in Sprint
- Fuyuko Tachizaki (JPN), 4th place in Pursuit
