= 2017–18 Biathlon World Cup – Stage 4 =

The 2017–18 Biathlon World Cup – Stage 4 was the 4th event of the season and was held in Oberhof, Germany, from 4 January until 7 January 2018.

== Schedule of events ==
Date	Time	Events
January 4	12:30 CET	Women's 7.5 km Sprint
January 5	14:15 CET	Men's 10 km Sprint
January 6	12:15 CET	Women's 10 km Pursuit
January 6	15:00 CET	Men's 12.5 km Pursuit
January 7	11:30 CET	4 x 6 km Women's Relay
January 7	14:30 CET	4 x 7.5 km Men's Relay

== Medal winners ==
=== Men ===
Event:	Gold:	Time	Silver:	Time	Bronze:	Time
10 km Sprint details	Martin Fourcade; France	25:03.3 (0+0)	Emil Hegle Svendsen; Norway	25:11.4 (0+0)	Johannes Thingnes Bø; Norway	25:13.5 (2+0)
12.5 km Pursuit details	Martin Fourcade; France	32:23.6 (1+0+0+0)	Johannes Thingnes Bø; Norway	32:29.9 (1+1+1+0)	Tarjei Bø; Norway	32:54.5 (0+0+0+0)
4 x 7.5 km Relay details	Sweden; Martin Ponsiluoma; Jesper Nelin; Sebastian Samuelsson; Fredrik Lindström	1:19:44.1 (0+1) (0+1) (0+2) (0+0) (0+1) (1+3) (0+0) (0+1)	Italy; Thomas Bormolini; Lukas Hofer; Dominik Windisch; Thierry Chenal	1:20:54.9 (0+1) (1+3) (0+3) (0+1) (0+0) (0+0) (0+0) (1+3)	Norway; Vetle Sjåstad Christiansen; Henrik L'Abee-Lund; Lars Helge Birkeland; Tarjei Bø	1:21:48.7 (0+0) (0+1) (2+3) (0+2) (1+3) (0+1) (0+2) (0+2)

=== Women ===
Event:	Gold:	Time	Silver:	Time	Bronze:	Time
7.5 km Sprint details	Anastasiya Kuzmina; Slovakia	22:23.7 (1+0)	Kaisa Mäkäräinen; Finland	22:59.1 (0+1)	Veronika Vitkova; Czech Republic	23:03.8 (1+0)
10 km Pursuit details	Anastasiya Kuzmina; Slovakia	30:49.5 (0+1+1+0)	Dorothea Wierer; Italy	31:53.9 (0+0+0+0)	Vita Semerenko; Ukraine	31:59.7 (0+0+0+0)
4 x 6 km Relay details	France; Anaïs Bescond; Anaïs Chevalier; Célia Aymonier; Justine Braisaz	1:12:42.4 (0+1) (0+0) (1+3) (0+0) (0+0) (0+2) (0+1) (0+3)	Germany; Vanessa Hinz; Denise Herrmann; Franziska Preuß; Maren Hammerschmidt	1:13:14.8 (0+3) (1+3) (0+2) (0+0) (0+0) (0+0) (0+2) (1+3)	Sweden; Linn Persson; Anna Magnusson; Elisabeth Högberg; Mona Brorsson	1:13:30.6 (0+2) (0+0) (0+0) (0+2) (0+0) (0+1) (0+2) (0+1)
