= 2017–18 Biathlon World Cup – Stage 7 =

The 2017–18 Biathlon World Cup – Stage 7 was the 7th event of the season and was held in Kontiolahti, Finland, from 8 March until 11 March 2018.

== Schedule of events ==
Date	Time	Events
March 8	17:45 CET	Men's 10 km Sprint
March 9	17:45 CET	Women's 7.5 km Sprint
March 10	13:40 CET	6 km + 7.5 km Single Mixed Relay
March 10	16:45 CET	2 × 6 km + 2 × 7.5 km Mixed Relay
March 11	13:30 CET	Men's 15 km Mass Start
March 11	16:10 CET	Women's 12.5 km Mass Start

== Medal winners ==
=== Men ===
Event:	Gold:	Time	Silver:	Time	Bronze:	Time
10 km Sprint details	Anton Shipulin; Russia	23:51.6 (0+0)	Andrejs Rastorgujevs; Latvia	23:57.4 (0+0)	Quentin Fillon Maillet; France	24:08.9 (0+0)
15 km Mass Start details	Julian Eberhard; Austria	38:04.8 (0+0+1+1)	Martin Fourcade; France	38:11.7 (2+0+0+0)	Anton Shipulin; Russia	38:24.1 (0+1+0+0)

=== Women ===
Event:	Gold:	Time	Silver:	Time	Bronze:	Time
7.5 km Sprint details	Darya Domracheva; Belarus	20:56.8 (0+1)	Franziska Hildebrand; Germany	20:57.3 (0+0)	Lisa Vittozzi; Italy	21:02.3 (0+1)
12.5 km Mass Start details	Vanessa Hinz; Germany	35:47.9 (0+0+0+0)	Lisa Vittozzi; Italy	36:01.4 (0+0+0+1)	Anaïs Chevalier; France	36:04.7 (0+0+0+1)

=== Mixed ===
Event:	Gold:	Time	Silver:	Time	Bronze:	Time
6 km + 7.5 km Single Mixed Relay details	France; Anaïs Chevalier; Antonin Guigonnat	33:29.1 (0+1) (0+2) (0+1) (0+0) (0+0) (0+0) (0+2) (0+0)	Austria; Lisa Hauser; Julian Eberhard	33:31.5 (0+2) (0+1) (0+1) (0+0) (0+0) (0+1) (0+2) (0+0)	Norway; Marte Olsbu; Johannes Thingnes Bø	33:33.5 (0+2) (0+2) (0+0) (0+1) (1+3) (0+0) (0+2) (0+1)
2 × 6 km + 2 × 7.5 km Mixed Relay details	Italy; Dorothea Wierer; Lisa Vittozzi; Dominik Windisch; Lukas Hofer	1:15:08.3 (0+3) (0+3) (0+1) (1+3) (0+2) (0+0) (0+0) (0+1)	Ukraine; Anastasiya Merkushyna; Vita Semerenko; Artem Pryma; Dmytro Pidruchnyi	1:15:09.8 (0+0) (0+0) (0+1) (0+0) (0+1) (0+0) (0+0) (0+1)	Norway; Synnøve Solemdal; Tiril Eckhoff; Henrik L'Abee-Lund; Tarjei Bø	1:15:17.4 (0+1) (0+2) (0+1) (0+3) (0+1) (0+0) (0+0) (0+1)

== Achievements ==
Best performance for all time

- Vanessa Hinz (GER), 1st place in Mass Start
