= Federica Sanfilippo =

Italian biathlete (born 1990)

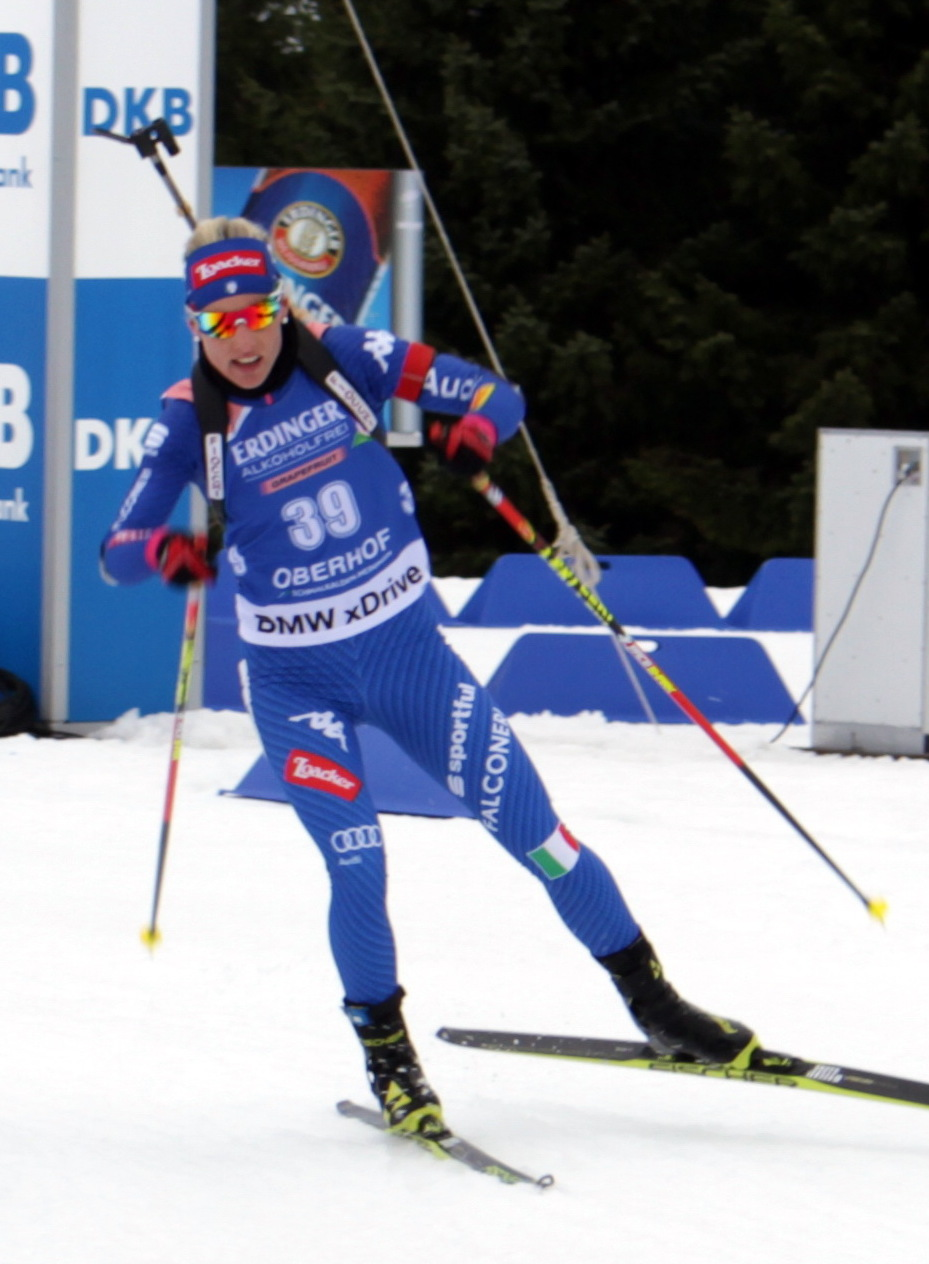
- Sanfilippo in 2018

Personal information
- Born: 24 October 1990 (age 35) Sterzing, Italy
- Height: 1.65 m (5 ft 5 in)

Sport

Professional information
- Club: Fiamme Oro

World Cup
- Individual victories
- All victories: 2
- Individual podiums: 1
- All podiums: 7

Federica Sanfilippo (born 24 October 1990) is a former Italian biathlete. She competed in the Biathlon World Cup, and represented Italy at the Biathlon World Championships 2016 in Holmenkollen. She abruptly retired from Biathlon in 2023.

== World Cup ==
=== Podiums ===
Season	Place	Competition	Placement
2014–15	(Norway) Holmenkollen	Relay	2nd
2015–16	(Sweden) Östersund	Sprint	2nd
2015–16	(Austria) Hochfilzen	Relay	1st
2016–17	(Italy) Antholz	Relay	3rd
2017–18	(Germany) Ruhpolding	Relay	2nd
2017–18	(Norway) Holmenkollen	Relay	3rd
2018–19	(Austria) Hochfilzen	Relay	1st
2021–22	(Finland) Kontiolahti	Relay	3rd
