= 2017–18 Biathlon World Cup – Stage 2 =

The 2017–18 Biathlon World Cup – Stage 2 was the 2nd event of the season and was held in Hochfilzen, Austria, from 8 December until 10 December 2017.

== Schedule of events ==
Date	Time	Events
8 December	11:30 CET	Women's 7.5 km Sprint
8 December	14:15 CET	Men's 10 km Sprint
9 December	12:15 CET	Women's 10 km Pursuit
9 December	14:45 CET	Men's 12.5 km Pursuit
10 December	11:30 CET	4 x 7.5 km Men's Relay
10 December	14:10 CET	4 x 6 km Women's Relay

== Medal winners ==
=== Men ===
Event:	Gold:	Time	Silver:	Time	Bronze:	Time
10 km Sprint details	Johannes Thingnes Bø; Norway	24:18.4 (0+0)	Martin Fourcade; France	24:30.5 (0+0)	Jakov Fak; Slovenia	22:44.3 (0+0)
12.5 km Pursuit details	Johannes Thingnes Bø; Norway	36:41.1 (2+0+1+0)	Jakov Fak; Slovenia	37:39.9 (0+0+1+0)	Martin Fourcade; France	37:51.1 (1+0+1+3)
4 x 7,5 km Men Relay details	Norway; Ole Einar Bjoerndalen; Henrik L'Abée-Lund; Erlend Bjøntegaard; Lars Helge Birkeland	1:21:21.8 (0+2) (0+0) (0+0) (0+3) (0+2) (0+1) (0+0) (0+1)	Germany; Erik Lesser; Benedikt Doll; Arnd Peiffer; Simon Schempp	1:23:16.7 (0+0) (0+3) (0+0) (0+3) (0+2) (0+3) (0+3) (0+3)	France; Jean Guillaume Beatrix; Simon Desthieux; Emilien Jacquelin; Quentin Fillon Maillet	1:23:55.8 (0+0) (2+3) (0+2) (0+2) (0+0) (0+3) (0+0) (1+3)

=== Women ===
Event:	Gold:	Time	Silver:	Time	Bronze:	Time
7.5 km Sprint details	Darya Domracheva; Belarus	22:40.2 (0+0)	Anastasiya Kuzmina; Slovakia	23:03.3 (1+0)	Dorothea Wierer; Italy	23:10.8 (1+0)
10 km Pursuit details	Anastasiya Kuzmina; Slovakia	34:31.2 (1+0+0+0)	Kaisa Mäkäräinen; Finland	34:41.4 (1+0+0+1)	Darya Domracheva; Belarus	34:43.0 (0+0+1+0)
4 x 6 km Women Relay details	Germany; Vanessa Hinz; Franziska Hildebrand; Maren Hammerschmidt; Laura Dahlmeier	1:14:36.4 (0+1) (0+1) (0+2) (0+2) (0+1) (0+0) (0+1) (0+1)	Ukraine; Vita Semerenko; Yuliia Dzhima; Valj Semerenko; Olena Pidhrushna	1:15:21.3 (0+1) (0+0) (0+0) (0+0) (0+1) (0+1) (0+1) (0+1)	France; Marie Dorin Habert; Celia Aymonier; Justine Braisaz; Anais Bescond	1:15:40.9 (0+1) (2+3) (0+2) (0+2) (0+2) (0+1) (0+1) (0+1)
