= Thomas Bormolini =

Italian biathlete (born 1991)

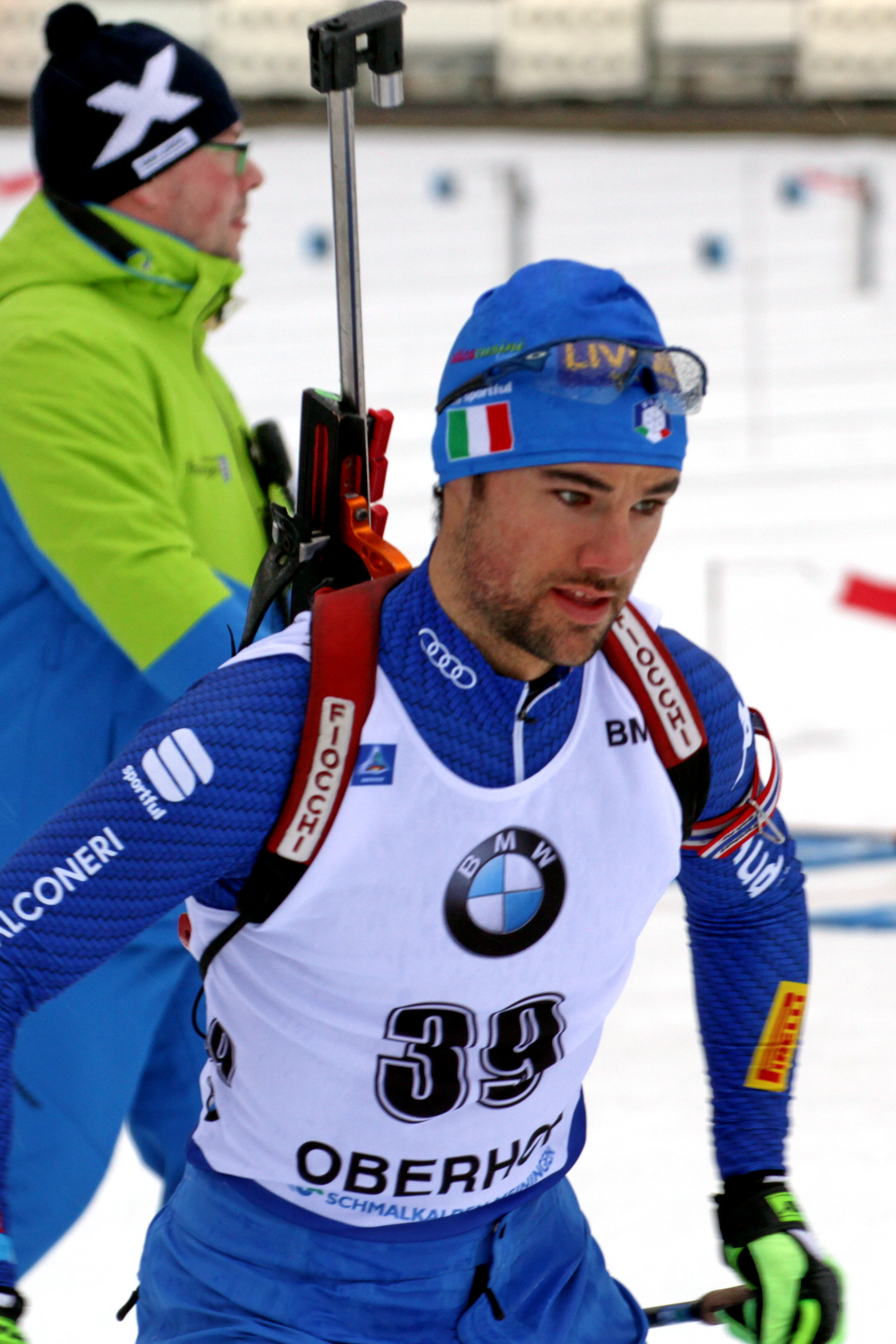
Bormolini in 2018

Thomas Bormolini (born 29 August 1991 in Sondalo) is an Italian biathlete. He competed in the 2014/15 world cup season, and represented Italy at the Biathlon World Championships 2015 in Kontiolahti.

== Biathlon results ==
All results are sourced from the International Biathlon Union.

=== Olympic Games ===
0 medals

Event	Individual	Sprint	Pursuit	Mass start	Relay	Mixed relay
(South Korea) 2018 Pyeongchang	56th	51st	48th	—	12th	—
(China) 2022 Beijing	63rd	23rd	33rd	—	7th	9th

=== World Championships ===
0 medals

Event	Individual	Sprint	Pursuit	Mass start	Relay	Mixed relay	Single Mixed relay
(Finland) 2015 Kontiolahti	83rd	90th	—	—	12th	—	—
(Norway) 2016 Oslo Holmenkollen	51st	56th	37th	—	11th	—	—
(Austria) 2017 Hochfilzen	59th	46th	48th	—	5th	—	—
(Sweden) 2019 Östersund	43rd	43rd	27th	—	15th	—	—
(Italy) 2020 Rasen-Antholz	48th	40th	45th	—	7th	—	—
(Slovenia) 2021 Pokljuka	—	26th	18th	23rd	—	—	—

*During Olympic seasons competitions are only held for those events not included in the Olympic program.
