= 2017–18 Biathlon World Cup – Stage 9 =

The 2017–18 Biathlon World Cup – Stage 9 is the 9th and final event of the season and was held in Tyumen, Russia, from 22 until 25 March 2018.

== Boycott of the event ==
The Canadian team announced on 15 December that they will boycott the event after the IBU decided to keep the event in Tyumen. This was followed up by the delegations from the United States and Czech Republic as well as individual boycotts from Sebastian Samuelsson from Sweden and Klemen Bauer from Slovenia. Due to the ongoing crisis in Donbass Ukraine also boycotted the event.

== Schedule of events ==
Date	Time	Events
22 March	14:45 CET	Men's 10 km Sprint
23 March	14:45 CET	Women's 7.5 km Sprint
24 March	12:30 CET	Men's 12.5 km Pursuit
24 March	15:15 CET	Women's 10 km Pursuit
25 March	12:00 CET	Men's 15 km Mass Start
25 March	14:45 CET	Women's 12.5 km Mass Start

== Medal winners ==
=== Men ===
Event:	Gold:	Time	Silver:	Time	Bronze:	Time
10 km Sprint details	Martin Fourcade; France	25:49.0 (0+0)	Simon Desthieux; France	26:22.2 (0+0)	Fredrik Lindström; Sweden	26:22.5 (0+0)
12.5 km Pursuit details	Martin Fourcade; France	32:09.7 (0+0+0+1)	Johannes Thingnes Bø; Norway	32:57.6 (0+0+1+0)	Lukas Hofer; Italy	33:18.1 (0+0+0+0)
15 km Mass Start details	Maxim Tsvetkov; Russia	37:37.3 (0+0+0+0)	Erlend Bjøntegaard; Norway	37:40.0 (0+0+0+0)	Johannes Thingnes Bø; Norway	37:53.9 (1+0+1+0)

=== Women ===
Event:	Gold:	Time	Silver:	Time	Bronze:	Time
7.5 km Sprint details	Darya Domracheva; Belarus	21:42.8 (0+0)	Kaisa Mäkäräinen; Finland	21:44.0 (0+0)	Tiril Eckhoff; Norway	22:16.1 (1+0)
10 km Pursuit details	Kaisa Mäkäräinen; Finland	30:52.7 (0+1+1+0)	Anaïs Bescond; France	30:52.9 (0+0+0+1)	Laura Dahlmeier; Germany	31:10.2 (0+0+0+1)
12.5 km Mass Start details	Darya Domracheva; Belarus	35:27.4 (0+0+1+0)	Paulína Fialková; Slovakia	35:29.2 (1+0+0+0)	Anaïs Chevalier; France	35:34.0 (0+0+0+0)
