= 2017–18 Biathlon World Cup – Stage 5 =

The 2017–18 Biathlon World Cup – Stage 5 was the 5th event of the season and was held in Ruhpolding, Germany, from 10 January until 14 January 2018.

== Schedule of events ==
Date	Time	Events
January 10	14:20 CET	Men's 20 km Individual
January 11	14:20 CET	Women's 15 km Individual
January 12	14:30 CET	4 x 7.5 km Men's Relay
January 13	14:30 CET	4 x 6 km Women's Relay
January 14	12:15 CET	Men's 15 km Mass Start
January 14	14:40 CET	Women's 12.5 km Mass Start

== Medal winners ==
=== Men ===
Event:	Gold:	Time	Silver:	Time	Bronze:	Time
20 km Individual details	Martin Fourcade; France	44:27.9 (0+0+0+1)	Ondřej Moravec; Czech Republic	45:28.9 (0+0+0+0)	Johannes Thingnes Bø; Norway	45:34.2 (0+0+0+1)
4 x 7,5 km Relay details	Norway; Lars Helge Birkeland; Tarjei Bø; Emil Hegle Svendsen; Johannes Thingnes Bø	1:13:11.1 (0+1) (0+0) (0+3) (0+0) (0+0) (0+1) (0+0) (0+2)	France; Simon Desthieux; Quentin Fillon Maillet; Martin Fourcade; Antonin Guigonnat	1:13:36.0 (0+2) (0+1) (0+2) (0+0) (0+0) (0+0) (0+1) (0+0)	Russia; Alexey Volkov; Maxim Tsvetkov; Anton Babikov; Anton Shipulin	1:14:04.5 (0+0) (0+1) (0+2) (0+0) (0+0) (0+0) (0+0) (0+1)
15 km Mass Start details	Johannes Thingnes Bø; Norway	37:11.2 (0+0+0+1)	Martin Fourcade; France	37:15.7 (0+0+2+0)	Antonin Guigonnat; France	37:19.6 (0+0+0+0)

=== Women ===
Event:	Gold:	Time	Silver:	Time	Bronze:	Time
15 km Individual details	Dorothea Wierer; Italy	41:29.0 (0+0+0+0)	Kaisa Mäkäräinen; Finland	41:41.7 (1+0+0+0)	Rosanna Crawford; Canada	41:50.2 (0+0+0+0)
4 x 6 km Relay details	Germany; Franziska Preuß; Denise Herrmann; Franziska Hildebrand; Laura Dahlmeier	1:08:47.0 (0+0) (0+0) (0+0) (0+2) (0+3) (0+1) (0+1) (0+2)	Italy; Lisa Vittozzi; Dorothea Wierer; Nicole Gontier; Federica Sanfilippo	1:08:49.9 (0+0) (0+0) (0+0) (0+0) (0+1) (0+2) (0+0) (0+0)	Sweden; Linn Persson; Mona Brorsson; Anna Magnusson; Hanna Öberg	1:09:04.2 (0+0) (0+1) (0+0) (0+1) (0+0) (0+1) (0+1) (0+1)
12.5 km Mass Start details	Kaisa Mäkäräinen; Finland	34:05.6 (1+0+0+1)	Laura Dahlmeier; Germany	34:06.4 (1+0+0+1)	Veronika Vitkova; Czech Republic	34:10.2 (1+0+1+0)
