= 2017–18 Biathlon World Cup – Stage 6 =

The 2017–18 Biathlon World Cup – Stage 6 was the 6th event of the season and was held in Antholz, Italy, from 18 January until 21 January 2018.

== Schedule of events ==
Date	Time	Events
January 18	14:15 CET	Women's 7.5 km Sprint
January 19	14:15 CET	Men's 10 km Sprint
January 20	13:15 CET	Women's 10 km Pursuit
January 20	15:00 CET	Men's 12.5 km Pursuit
January 21	12:30 CET	Women's 12.5 km Mass Start
January 21	14:45 CET	Men's 15 km Mass Start

== Medal winners ==
=== Men ===
Event:	Gold:	Time	Silver:	Time	Bronze:	Time
10 km Sprint details	Johannes Thingnes Bø; Norway	23:19.3 (1+0)	Martin Fourcade; France	23:32.1 (0+0)	Arnd Peiffer; Germany	24:01.5 (0+0)
12.5 km Pursuit details	Johannes Thingnes Bø; Norway	31:14.4 (0+0+0+0)	Martin Fourcade; France	32:14.9 (1+0+0+0)	Anton Shipulin; Russia	32:32.9 (1+0+0+0)
15 km Mass Start details	Martin Fourcade; France	40:18.6 (0+1+0+1)	Tarjei Bø; Norway	40:21.4 (1+0+0+1)	Erlend Bjøntegaard; Norway	40:23.7 (0+1+0+1)

=== Women ===
Event:	Gold:	Time	Silver:	Time	Bronze:	Time
7.5 km Sprint details	Tiril Eckhoff; Norway	21:05.3 (0+0)	Laura Dahlmeier; Germany	21:17.3 (0+0)	Veronika Vítková; Czech Republic	21:25.9 (0+0)
10 km Pursuit details	Laura Dahlmeier; Germany	29:45.0 (1+0+0+0)	Dorothea Wierer; Italy	30:01.3 (1+0+1+0)	Darya Domracheva; Belarus	30:05.2 (0+1+0+1)
12.5 km Mass Start details	Darya Domracheva; Belarus	40:23.9 (1+0+0+0)	Anastasiya Kuzmina; Slovakia	40:35.8 (1+1+0+1)	Kaisa Mäkäräinen; Finland	40:40.1 (1+0+2+1)
