= 2017–18 Biathlon World Cup – Stage 3 =

The 2017–18 Biathlon World Cup – Stage 3 was the 3rd event of the season and was held in Annecy, France, from 15 December until 17 December 2017.

== Schedule of events ==
Date	Time	Events
14 December	14:15 CET	Women's 7.5 km Sprint
15 December	14:15 CET	Men's 10 km Sprint
16 December	11:45 CET	Women's 10 km Pursuit
16 December	14:45 CET	Men's 12.5 km Pursuit
17 December	11:45 CET	Women's 12.5 km Mass Start
17 December	14:30 CET	Men's 15 km Mass Start

== Medal winners ==
=== Men ===
Event:	Gold:	Time	Silver:	Time	Bronze:	Time
10 km Sprint details	Johannes Thingnes Bø; Norway	22:16.9 (0+0)	Martin Fourcade; France	22:38.0 (0+0)	Antonin Guigonnat; France	22:51.6 (0+0)
12.5 km Pursuit details	Johannes Thingnes Bø; Norway	32:52.7 (0+0+0+0)	Martin Fourcade; France	33:54.1 (0+0+1+1)	Anton Shipulin; Russia	34:03.2 (0+0+0+1)
15 km Mass Start details	Martin Fourcade; France	36:30.3 (0+0+0+0)	Johannes Thingnes Bø; Norway	36:34.2 (2+0+0+0)	Erik Lesser; Germany	36:36.5 (0+0+0+0)

=== Women ===
Event:	Gold:	Time	Silver:	Time	Bronze:	Time
7.5 km Sprint details	Anastasiya Kuzmina; Slovakia	20:59.6 (0+0)	Laura Dahlmeier; Germany	21:33.5 (0+0)	Vita Semerenko; Ukraine	21:41.0 (0+0)
10 km Pursuit details	Laura Dahlmeier; Germany	30:09.9 (0+0+0+1)	Anastasiya Kuzmina; Slovakia	30:23.9 (3+0+0+1)	Lisa Vittozzi; Italy	30:41.7 (1+0+0+0)
12.5 km Mass Start details	Justine Braisaz; France	37:19.4 (0+0+1+0)	Iryna Kryuko; Belarus	37:30.6 (0+0+0+0)	Laura Dahlmeier; Germany	37:39.3 (0+1+0+1)
