= 2017–18 Biathlon World Cup – Stage 1 =

The 2017–18 Biathlon World Cup – Stage 1 was the opening event of the season and was held in Östersund, Sweden, from 26 November until 3 December 2017.

== Schedule of events ==
Date	Time	Events
November 26	14:15 CET	6 km + 7.5 km Single Mixed Relay
November 26	17:10 CET	2 x 6 km + 2 x 7.5 km Mixed Relay
November 29	17:15 CET	Women's 15 km Individual
November 30	17:15 CET	Men's 20 km Individual
December 1	17:45 CET	Women's 7.5 km Sprint
December 2	14:45 CET	Men's 10 km Sprint
December 3	13:15 CET	Women's 10 km Pursuit
December 3	15:15 CET	Men's 12.5 km Pursuit

== Medal winners ==
=== Men ===
Event:	Gold:	Time	Silver:	Time	Bronze:	Time
20 km Individual	Johannes Thingnes Bø; Norway	53:24.5 (0+0+0+0)	Quentin Fillon Maillet; France	55:25.5 (0+0+0+0)	Martin Fourcade; France	55:38.8 (0+0+0+2)
10 km Sprint	Tarjei Bø; Norway	22:40.6 (0+1)	Martin Fourcade; France	22:41.3 (1+0)	Erik Lesser; Germany	22:44.3 (0+1)
12.5 km Pursuit	Martin Fourcade; France	30:12.2 (1+0+0+0)	Jakov Fak; Slovenia	30:53.0 (1+0+0+1)	Quentin Fillon Maillet; France	30:54.3 (1+0+0+1)

=== Women ===
Event:	Gold:	Time	Silver:	Time	Bronze:	Time
15 km Individual details	Nadezhda Skardino; Belarus	42:57.4 (0+0+0+0)	Synnøve Solemdal; Norway	43:00.3 (0+0+0+0)	Yuliia Dzhima; Ukraine	43:09.4 (0+0+0+0)
7.5 km Sprint details	Denise Herrmann; Germany	19:54.8 (0+1)	Justine Braisaz; France	20:10.1 (0+0)	Yuliia Dzhima; Ukraine	20:14.4 (0+0)
10 km Pursuit details	Denise Herrmann; Germany	30:02.7 (0+0+2+0)	Justine Braisaz; France	30:27.5 (0+0+0+0)	Marte Olsbu; Norway	30:50.7 (0+1+0+1)

=== Mixed ===
Event:	Gold:	Time	Silver:	Time	Bronze:	Time
6 km + 7.5 km Single Mixed Relay details	Austria; Lisa Theresa Hauser; Simon Eder	36:17.0 (0+0) (0+1) (0+0) (0+0) (0+1) (0+0) (0+0) (0+0)	Germany; Vanessa Hinz; Erik Lesser	36:33.5 (0+0) (0+1) (0+1) (0+2) (0+2) (0+1) (0+1) (0+1)	Kazakhstan; Galina Vishnevskaya; Maxim Braun	36:49.7 (0+1) (0+0) (0+2) (0+2) (0+0) (0+0) (0+0) (0+0)
2 x 6 km + 2 x 7.5 km Mixed Relay details	Norway; Ingrid Landmark Tandrevold; Tiril Eckhoff; Johannes Thingnes Bø; Emil Hegle Svendsen	1:11:31.7 (0+0) (0+2) (0+1) (0+2) (0+2) (0+3) (0+0) (0+3)	Italy; Lisa Vittozzi; Dorothea Wierer; Dominik Windisch; Lukas Hofer	1:11:37.0 (0+0) (0+0) (0+0) (0+2) (0+0) (0+0) (1+3) (0+1)	Germany; Franziska Preuß; Maren Hammerschmidt; Benedikt Doll; Arnd Peiffer	1:11:38.1 (0+1) (0+1) (0+1) (0+1) (0+3) (0+1) (0+1) (0+1)
