= Maxim Tsvetkov =

Russian biathlete

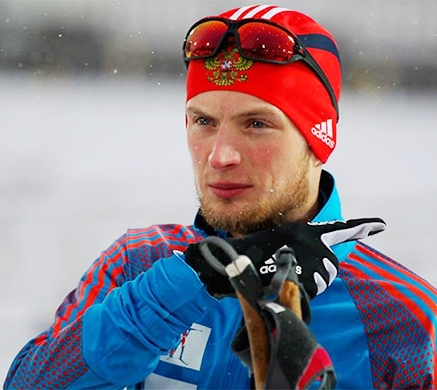

Personal information
- Native name: Максим Сергеевич Цветков
- Nationality: (Russia) Russian
- Born: 3 January 1992 (age 34) Babayevo, Vologda Oblast, Russia

Sport

Professional information
- World Cup debut: 28 February 2013

Olympic Games
- Teams: 1 (2022)
- Medals: 1

World Cup
- Seasons: 5 (2012/13–)
- All races: 58
- Individual victories: 1
- All victories: 3
- Individual podiums: 3
- All podiums: 8
Medal record
Representing ROC
Olympic Games
Bronze medal – third place	2022 Beijing	4 × 7.5 km relay
Representing Russia
World Championships
Gold medal – first place	2017 Hochfilzen	4 × 7.5 km relay
European Championships
Gold medal – first place	2014 Nove Mesto	12.5 km pursuit
Silver medal – second place	2014 Nove Mesto	10 km sprint
Bronze medal – third place	2014 Nove Mesto	20 km individual
Junior World Championships
Gold medal – first place	2012 Kontiolahti	10 km sprint
Gold medal – first place	2012 Kontiolahti	12.5 km pursuit
Silver medal – second place	2013 Obertilliach	12.5 km pursuit
Bronze medal – third place	2013 Obertilliach	10 km sprint
Bronze medal – third place	2013 Obertilliach	4 × 7.5 km relay
Youth World Championships
Gold medal – first place	2011 Nové Město	7.5 km sprint
Gold medal – first place	2011 Nové Město	10 km pursuit
Gold medal – first place	2011 Nové Město	3 × 7.5 km relay
World Military Games
Gold medal – first place	2017 Sochi	10 km sprint
Gold medal – first place	2017 Sochi	10 km team sprint
Bronze medal – third place	2017 Sochi	Mixed relay

Maxim Sergeyevich Tsvetkov (Russian: Максим Сергеевич Цветков; born 3 January 1992) is a Russian biathlete. He competes in the Biathlon World Cup, and represented Russia at the Biathlon World Championships 2016.

== Biathlon results ==
All results are sourced from the International Biathlon Union.

=== Olympic Games ===
Event	Individual	Sprint	Pursuit	Mass start	Relay	Mixed relay
Representing ROC Russian Olympic Committee
(China) 2022 Beijing	4th	4th	17th	20th	Bronze	―
