= Henrik L'Abée-Lund =

Norwegian biathlete (born 1986)

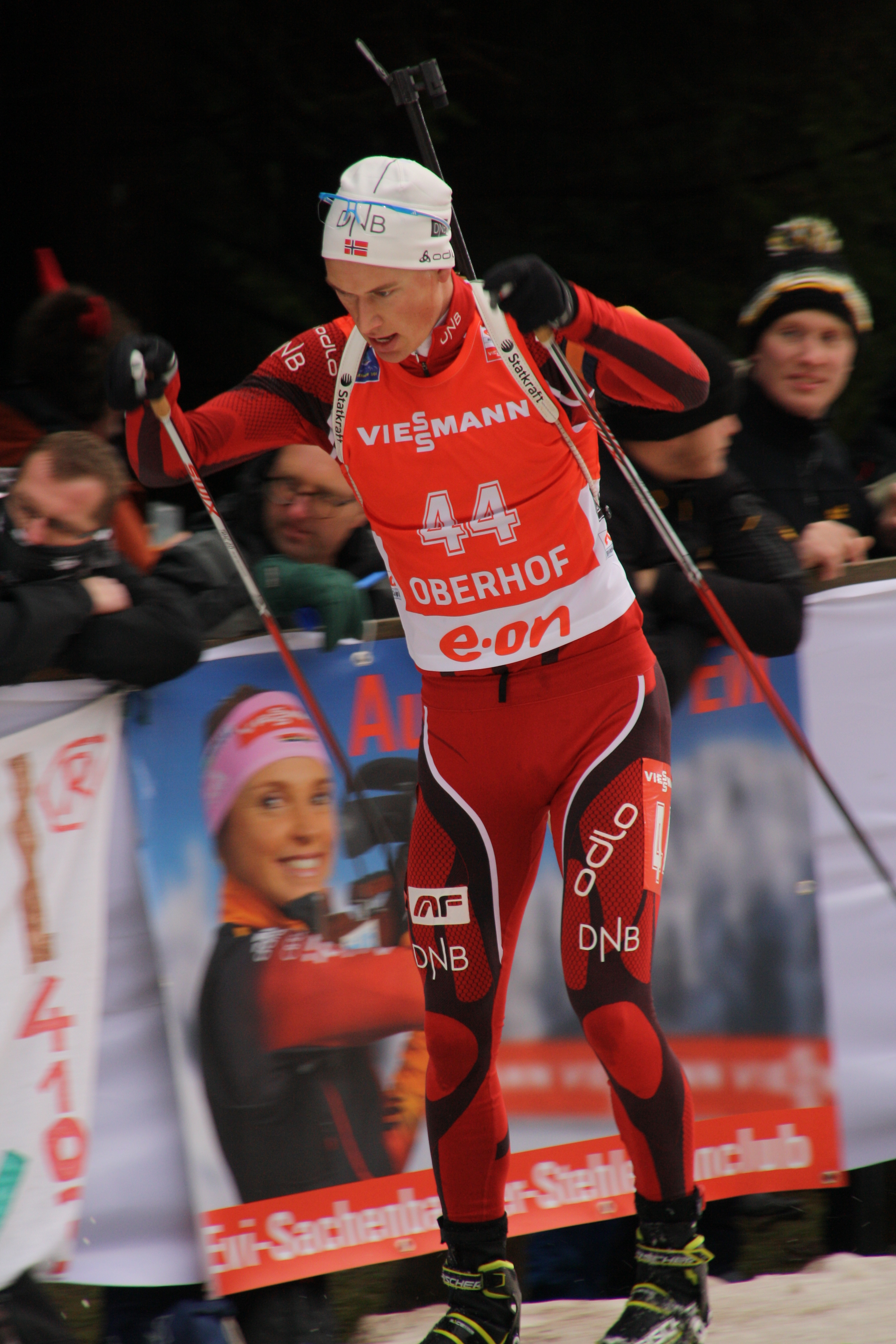

Personal information
- Born: 26 March 1986 (age 40) Trondheim, Norway

Sport
- Sport: Skiing

World Cup career
- Indiv. podiums: 3
- Indiv. wins: 1
Medal record
Men's biathlon
Representing Norway
World Championships
Gold medal – first place	2013 Nové Město	4 × 7.5 km relay
Junior World Championships
Silver medal – second place	2007 Martell	4 × 7.5 km relay
Bronze medal – third place	2007 Martell	10 km sprint
European Championships
Gold medal – first place	2009 Ufa	4x7.5 km relay
Silver medal – second place	2012 Osrblie	4x7.5 km relay
Silver medal – second place	2016 Tyumen	10 km sprint
Bronze medal – third place	2016 Tyumen	2x6+2x7.5 km mixed relay
- Updated on 15 March 2018

Henrik L'Abée-Lund (born 26 March 1986) is a Norwegian former biathlete. He has competed in the Biathlon World Cup since 2010–11 season. L'Abée-Lund has won a gold medal at the Biathlon World Championships 2013 (4 × 7.5 km relay). He announced his retirement from Biathlon on 3 May 2019, citing his demotion to the B-team, family and lack of passion for the sport as the reasons.
