= 2015–16 Biathlon World Cup – Overall Men =

== 2014–15 Top 3 standings ==
Medal	Athlete	Points
Gold:	(France) Martin Fourcade	1042
Silver:	(Russia) Anton Shipulin	978
Bronze:	(Slovenia) Jakov Fak	883

== Events summary ==
Event	Winner	Second	Third
Östersund 20 km Individual details	Ole Einar Bjørndalen; Norway	Simon Schempp; Germany	Alexey Volkov; Russia
Östersund 10 km Sprint details	Martin Fourcade; France	Arnd Peiffer; Germany	Ole Einar Bjørndalen; Norway
Östersund 12.5 km Pursuit details	Martin Fourcade; France	Arnd Peiffer; Germany	Quentin Fillon Maillet; France
Hochfilzen 10 km Sprint details	Simon Schempp; Germany	Martin Fourcade; France	Tarjei Bø; Norway
Hochfilzen 12.5 km Pursuit details	Martin Fourcade; France	Simon Schempp; Germany	Anton Shipulin; Russia
Pokljuka 10 km Sprint details	Simon Schempp; Germany	Ole Einar Bjørndalen; Norway	Evgeniy Garanichev; Russia
Pokljuka 12.5 km Pursuit details	Simon Schempp; Germany	Martin Fourcade; France	Anton Shipulin; Russia
Pokljuka 15 km Mass start details	Jean-Guillaume Béatrix; France	Emil Hegle Svendsen; Norway	Ole Einar Bjørndalen; Norway
Ruhpolding 10 km Sprint details	Johannes Thingnes Bø; Norway	Tarjei Bø; Norway	Emil Hegle Svendsen; Norway
Ruhpolding 12.5 km Pursuit details	Simon Eder; Austria	Martin Fourcade; France	Michal Šlesingr; Czech Republic
Ruhpolding 15 km Mass start details	Martin Fourcade; France	Ondřej Moravec; Czech Republic	Tarjei Bø; Norway
Ruhpolding (2) 20 km Individual details	Martin Fourcade; France	Simon Eder; Austria	Anton Shipulin; Russia
Ruhpolding (2) 15 km Mass start details	Erik Lesser; Germany	Martin Fourcade; France	Evgeniy Garanichev; Russia
Antholz-Anterselva 10 km Sprint details	Simon Schempp; Germany	Maxim Tsvetkov; Russia	Tarjei Bø; Norway
Antholz-Anterselva 12.5 km Pursuit details	Anton Shipulin; Russia	Simon Schempp; Germany	Johannes Thingnes Bø; Norway
Canmore 10 km Sprint details	Martin Fourcade; France	Anton Shipulin; Russia	Simon Schempp; Germany
Canmore 15 km Mass start details	Dominik Windisch; Italy	Benedikt Doll; Germany	Quentin Fillon Maillet; France
Presque Isle 10 km Sprint details	Johannes Thingnes Bø; Norway	Anton Shipulin; Russia	Martin Fourcade; France
Presque Isle 12.5 km Pursuit details	Martin Fourcade; France	Johannes Thingnes Bø; Norway	Anton Shipulin; Russia
World Championships 10 km Sprint details	Martin Fourcade; France	Ole Einar Bjørndalen; Norway	Serhiy Semenov; Ukraine
World Championships 12.5 km Pursuit details	Martin Fourcade; France	Ole Einar Bjørndalen; Norway	Emil Hegle Svendsen; Norway
World Championships 20 km Individual details	Martin Fourcade; France	Dominik Landertinger; Austria	Simon Eder; Austria
World Championships 15 km Mass start details	Johannes Thingnes Bø; Norway	Martin Fourcade; France	Ole Einar Bjørndalen; Norway
Khanty-Mansiysk 10 km Sprint details	Julian Eberhard; Austria	Simon Schempp; Germany	Arnd Peiffer; Germany
Khanty-Mansiysk 12.5 km Pursuit details	Simon Schempp; Germany	Johannes Thingnes Bø; Norway	Erik Lesser; Germany
Khanty-Mansiysk 15 km Mass start details	Cancelled		

== Standings ==
For each event, a first place gives 60 points, a 2nd place 54 pts, a 3rd place 48 pts, a 4th place 43 pts, a fifth place 40 pts, a 6th place 38 pts, 7th 36 pts 8th 34 points, 9th 32 points, 10th 31 points, then linearly decreasing by one point down to the 40th place. Equal placings (ties) give an equal number of points. The sum of all WC points of the season, minus the points from 2 events in which the biathlete got the worst scores, gives the biathlete's total WC score.

#	Name	ÖST IN	ÖST SP	ÖST PU	HOC SP	HOC PU	POK SP	POK PU	POK MS	RU1 SP	RU1 PU	RU1 MS	RU2 IN	RU2 MS	ANT SP	ANT PU	CAN SP	CAN MS	PRE SP	PRE PU	OSL SP	OSL PU	OSL IN	OSL MS	KHA SP	KHA PU	KHA MS	Total
1.	Martin Fourcade (FRA)	20	60	60	54	60	40	54	36	43	54	60	60	54	13	43	60	38	48	60	60	60	60	54	~~1~~	~~DNS~~	—	1151
2	Johannes Thingnes Bø (NOR)	22	38	25	27	18	0	—	34	60	36	31	25	29	34	48	—	—	60	54	43	43	43	60	36	54	—	820
3	Anton Shipulin (RUS)	25	9	26	43	48	38	48	30	13	17	26	48	43	40	60	54	24	54	48	~~0~~	32	27	32	~~0~~	21	—	806
4	Simon Schempp (GER)	54	0	—	60	54	60	60	43	DNS	—	—	DNS	38	60	54	48	20	DNS	—	34	23	25	22	54	60	—	769
5	Simon Eder (AUT)	36	22	29	30	29	DNS	—	—	38	60	20	54	32	38	38	38	27	30	43	14	25	48	30	3	30	—	714
6	Tarjei Bø (NOR)	19	12	43	48	43	32	43	23	54	43	48	30	30	48	34	—	—	34	22	0	10	19	38	6	29	—	708
7	Evgeniy Garanichev (RUS)	10	14	34	38	27	48	38	27	1	32	36	38	48	23	31	31	26	—	—	38	30	34	16	12	27	—	659
8	Benedikt Doll (GER)	0	40	38	34	22	34	28	12	~~0~~	—	30	34	22	30	18	13	54	29	29	8	2	28	23	34	40	—	602
9	Dominik Landertinger (AUT)	34	0	0	28	40	DNS	—	24	36	30	16	17	16	28	32	40	43	—	—	32	27	54	26	43	34	—	600
10	Emil Hegle Svendsen (NOR)	43	36	40	31	36	30	36	54	48	40	28	12	31	14	29	—	—	—	—	24	48	9	6	—	—	—	595
11	Arnd Peiffer (GER)	0	54	54	—	—	0	14	28	30	13	40	0	4	32	40	30	34	32	DNF	36	28	—	40	48	32	—	589
12	Quentin Fillon Maillet (FRA)	43	43	48	22	34	36	40	31	10	22	34	13	28	~~0~~	~~DNS~~	0	48	8	DNF	25	31	22	21	21	DNF	—	580
13	Ole Einar Bjørndalen (NOR)	60	48	30	25	38	54	34	48	—	—	29	0	2	18	11	—	—	—	—	54	54	24	48	0	DNS	—	577
14	Erik Lesser (GER)	2	11	14	0	16	20	29	25	~~0~~	7	—	24	60	7	23	29	6	43	28	22	36	36	27	40	48	—	553
15	Tim Burke (USA)	4	0	2	11	14	27	32	18	23	15	—	11	—	24	19	18	36	21	36	27	24	0	29	38	38	—	467
16	Simon Desthieux (FRA)	26	20	20	32	19	28	17	38	20	16	21	—	34	~~0~~	DNS	0	22	0	2	29	38	13	14	22	18	—	449
17	Lowell Bailey (USA)	17	0	—	29	28	26	12	16	8	19	25	27	20	9	13	17	21	26	27	12	5	26	31	10	19	—	443
18	Michal Šlesingr (CZE)	0	17	21	0	—	0	5	—	34	48	24	8	—	4	9	27	2	27	38	26	29	21	24	29	31	—	424
19	Andreas Birnbacher (GER)	29	0	23	20	32	15	30	40	32	26	27	26	18	0	27	—	—	18	26	—	—	32	—	—	—	—	421
20	Andrejs Rastorgujevs (LAT)	—	0	5	5	15	10	20	—	27	29	32	0	—	5	20	25	40	36	20	21	14	0	10	32	28	—	394
21	Serhiy Semenov (UKR)	31	0	0	21	26	0	2	—	16	6	—	0	—	21	22	28	29	6	16	48	34	0	34	27	26	—	393
22	Dominik Windisch (ITA)	7	0	—	0	0	25	23	32	0	—	—	10	—	22	14	34	60	7	0	40	13	0	43	31	25	—	386
23	Michal Krčmář (CZE)	0	28	17	0	—	2	0	—	29	20	8	31	40	20	28	4	12	12	13	17	19	40	18	2	24	—	384
24	Julian Eberhard (AUT)	0	0	0	36	11	18	18	8	25	23	18	0	—	19	15	43	10	14	19	5	15	0	—	60	23	—	380
25	Ondřej Moravec (CZE)	6	1	22	17	21	22	15	4	28	34	54	43	36	0	0	0	32	DNS	—	0	DNS	6	—	16	16	—	373
26	Maxim Tsvetkov (RUS)	15	0	10	12	30	29	24	10	11	24	22	40	27	54	30	21	4	0	DNS	0	0	—	—	0	0	—	363
27	Simon Fourcade (FRA)	38	0	27	0	—	8	31	20	12	28	38	0	25	31	DNF	36	23	3	6	0	1	31	—	0	—	—	358
28	Nathan Smith (CAN)	14	32	31	23	23	17	6	29	26	38	12	0	26	0	0	10	25	—	—	0	26	0	—	DNS	—	—	338
29	Fredrik Lindström (SWE)	27	0	4	26	24	11	27	22	22	18	6	18	24	—	—	—	—	0	DNS	11	7	12	—	27	36	—	322
30	Krasimir Anev (BUL)	—	21	15	24	4	13	19	—	18	25	4	29	8	36	24	—	—	—	—	7	12	29	12	0	4	—	304
#	Name	ÖST IN	ÖST SP	ÖST PU	HOC SP	HOC PU	POK SP	POK PU	POK MS	RU1 SP	RU1 PU	RU1 MS	RU2 IN	RU2 MS	ANT SP	ANT PU	CAN SP	CAN MS	PRE SP	PRE PU	OSL SP	OSL PU	OSL IN	OSL MS	KHA SP	KHA PU	KHA MS	Total
31	Jean-Guillaume Béatrix (FRA)	11	10	13	14	13	9	26	60	9	11	10	0	—	43	DNF	2	30	0	9	—	—	11	—	0	0	—	281
32	Alexey Slepov (RUS)	—	23	28	3	12	43	16	26	0	0	2	—	—	27	21	0	18	—	—	—	—	—	—	18	14	—	251
33	Lukas Hofer (ITA)	—	0	—	18	20	24	9	—	0	0	—	28	14	29	7	23	—	19	3	0	—	10	—	24	20	—	248
34	Jakov Fak (SLO)	0	0	0	19	31	5	10	—	—	—	—	5	—	26	26	—	—	—	—	2	40	38	36	—	—	—	238
35	Benjamin Weger (SUI)	1	25	0	1	17	21	3	—	2	0	—	0	—	7	25	0	—	38	24	0	DNF	0	—	30	43	—	237
36	Sven Grossegger (AUT)	0	30	18	2	10	19	0	—	40	27	14	0	23	0	DNS	14	16	2	18	0	0	—	—	—	—	—	233
37	Dmytro Pidruchnyi (UKR)	—	34	32	15	0	0	22	14	31	31	43	0	10	0	DNS	—	—	—	—	0	DNS	—	—	—	—	—	232
38	Vladimir Iliev (BUL)	0	20	24	0	—	0	4	—	21	DNF	—	0	—	12	8	—	—	20	34	31	17	20	20	0	0	—	231
39	Dmitry Malyshko (RUS)	9	7	36	40	25	3	8	21	4	5	23	0	12	—	—	0	8	0	DNS	—	—	0	—	0	8	—	209
40	Oleksander Zhyrnyi (UKR)	0	—	—	0	—	0	1	—	19	1	—	15	—	16	17	11	—	10	25	13	16	1	—	28	22	—	195
41	Matej Kazár (SVK)	0	18	6	10	0	0	0	—	0	—	—	21	—	17	12	26	31	23	23	0	0	0	—	0	—	—	187
42	Artem Pryma (UKR)	21	0	0	0	3	0	—	—	—	—	—	—	—	9	5	24	28	25	32	19	9	—	—	—	—	—	175
43	Alexey Volkov (RUS)	48	—	—	—	—	31	25	6	—	—	—	9	—	0	—	19	—	0	—	—	—	2	—	17	10	—	167
44	Erlend Bjøntegaard (NOR)	—	—	—	—	—	—	—	—	24	14	—	32	6	0	—	—	—	31	40	0	—	—	—	DNS	—	—	147
44	Sean Doherty (USA)	24	16	0	16	6	0	—	—	—	—	—	0	—	0	DNS	—	—	28	21	0	0	7	—	20	9	—	147
46	Serafin Wiestner (SUI)	3	0	—	0	—	0	0	—	17	8	—	0	—	1	4	0	—	40	14	30	21	0	8	0	DNS	—	146
47	Vladimir Chepelin (BLR)	18	0	—	0	—	0	0	—	6	2	—	0	—	2	6	—	—	5	12	28	18	0	28	19	0	—	144
48	Anton Babikov (RUS)	23	—	—	—	—	—	—	—	—	—	—	—	—	10	36	—	—	—	—	18	20	—	25	—	—	—	132
49	Vitaliy Kilchytskyy (UKR)	—	0	—	—	—	—	—	—	15	12	—	22	—	15	2	9	—	0	—	—	—	16	—	23	13	—	127
50	Lars Helge Birkeland (NOR)	32	0	16	0	DNS	—	—	—	15	21	—	16	—	—	—	0	—	4	11	—	—	—	—	DNS	—	—	115
51	Yan Savitskiy (KAZ)	12	0	0	0	—	0	—	—	0	—	—	4	—	0	—	—	—	16	5	1	22	30	4	13	DNS	—	107
52	Klemen Bauer (SLO)	5	0	12	9	9	23	21	2	0	—	—	DNF	—	—	—	0	—	9	15	0	0	—	—	—	—	—	105
53	Jaroslav Soukup (CZE)	13	0	0	0	1	16	7	—	0	—	—	0	—	11	3	—	—	—	—	0	0	18	—	14	15	—	98
54	Alexander Os (NOR)	—	—	—	—	—	DNS	—	—	0	9	—	—	—	—	—	32	14	24	10	—	—	—	—	—	—	—	89
55	Aliaksandr Darozhka (BLR)	—	—	—	—	—	14	13	—	—	—	—	0	—	—	—	20	—	—	—	9	0	—	—	7	17	—	80
55	Brendan Green (CAN)	0	0	3	6	7	0	11	—	—	—	—	23	—	0	10	1	—	—	—	6	8	0	—	0	5	—	80
57	Leif Nordgren (USA)	0	0	—	0	0	0	0	—	—	—	—	14	—	0	0	15	—	0	—	23	0	14	DNF	—	—	—	66
58	Macx Davies (CAN)	0	31	11	0	—	7	0	—	0	0	—	0	—	0	—	16	—	—	—	0	0	—	—	0	—	—	65
59	Henrik L'Abée-Lund (NOR)	30	29	0	0	—	0	0	—	—	—	—	—	—	0	0	0	—	—	—	—	—	—	—	—	—	—	59
59	Jesper Nelin (SWE)	—	25	0	0	—	—	—	—	0	—	—	0	—	0	—	—	—	—	—	10	3	0	—	9	12	—	59
#	Name	ÖST IN	ÖST SP	ÖST PU	HOC SP	HOC PU	POK SP	POK PU	POK MS	RU1 SP	RU1 PU	RU1 MS	RU2 IN	RU2 MS	ANT SP	ANT PU	CAN SP	CAN MS	PRE SP	PRE PU	OSL SP	OSL PU	OSL IN	OSL MS	KHA SP	KHA PU	KHA MS	Total
59	Torstein Stenersen (SWE)	—	—	—	—	—	—	—	—	0	0	—	36	21	0	—	0	—	DNS	—	0	—	0	—	0	2	—	59
62	Christian De Lorenzi (ITA)	0	0	7	13	8	0	—	—	0	—	—	2	—	25	0	0	—	0	0	0	0	0	—	—	—	—	55
63	Kalev Ermits (EST)	0	0	—	0	0	0	—	—	0	—	—	0	—	0	—	0	—	22	30	0	—	—	—	—	—	—	52
64	Martin Otčenáš (SVK)	0	13	0	4	5	0	0	—	0	0	—	0	—	0	—	—	—	—	—	16	11	0	—	0	—	—	49
65	Raman Yaliotnau (BLR)	—	26	0	0	—	12	0	—	3	0	—	—	—	0	DNS	—	—	0	0	0	—	0	—	5	0	—	46
66	Alexander Povarnitsyn (RUS)	—	—	—	—	—	—	—	—	—	—	—	—	—	—	—	—	—	13	31	—	—	—	—	—	—	—	44
66	Daniel Böhm (GER)	0	27	9	0	0	0	—	—	0	4	—	—	—	—	—	0	—	0	4	—	—	—	—	—	—	—	44
66	Scott Gow (CAN)	0	0	—	8	0	6	0	—	0	0	—	0	—	0	—	7	—	—	—	0	0	23	—	0	—	—	44
69	Mario Dolder (SUI)	—	—	—	—	—	—	—	—	0	—	—	0	—	0	—	8	—	17	17	0	—	0	—	0	—	—	42
70	Dmitriy Dyuzhev (BLR)	16	0	—	0	0	1	0	—	0	—	—	3	—	0	0	—	—	0	—	—	—	0	—	15	3	—	38
71	Anton Sinapov (BUL)	—	0	0	0	—	0	—	—	—	—	—	—	—	—	—	—	—	0	DNS	0	—	—	—	25	11	—	36
72	Vladimir Semakov (UKR)	0	15	1	0	—	0	0	—	0	—	—	DNS	—	—	—	—	—	—	—	—	—	—	—	11	7	—	34
73	Daniel Mesotitsch (AUT)	28	5	0	0	0	—	—	—	—	—	—	—	—	—	—	—	—	—	—	—	—	—	—	—	—	—	33
74	Yuryi Liadov (BLR)	0	0	—	0	—	—	—	—	—	—	—	—	—	—	—	—	—	15	7	—	—	5	—	—	—	—	27
75	Tomas Kaukėnas (LTU)	0	4	0	0	—	0	—	—	—	—	—	0	—	0	—	—	—	—	—	20	0	0	—	0	—	—	24
76	Maksim Varabei (BLR)	—	—	—	—	—	—	—	—	—	—	—	—	—	—	—	22	—	—	—	0	—	—	—	—	—	—	22
76	Tomáš Krupčík (CZE)	0	3	0	0	—	0	—	—	0	0	—	0	—	3	16	0	—	0	—	—	—	—	—	—	—	—	22
78	Timofey Lapshin (RUS)	—	6	8	7	0	—	—	—	—	—	—	—	—	—	—	—	—	—	—	—	—	—	—	—	—	—	21
78	Tomáš Hasilla (SVK)	0	2	19	0	—	0	—	—	0	—	—	0	—	0	—	—	—	—	—	0	—	—	—	0	DNF	—	21
80	Johannes Kühn (GER)	—	—	—	—	—	—	—	—	—	—	—	20	—	0	—	—	—	—	—	—	—	—	—	—	—	—	20
80	Kauri Kõiv (EST)	0	0	—	0	0	0	—	—	0	DNF	—	0	—	0	—	—	—	—	—	3	0	17	—	0	—	—	20
82	David Komatz (AUT)	—	—	—	—	—	—	—	—	0	0	—	19	—	0	—	—	—	0	—	—	—	0	—	—	—	—	19
83	Cornel Puchianu (ROU)	0	0	0	0	0	0	—	—	0	—	—	0	—	0	—	0	—	0	—	15	0	0	—	0	—	—	15
83	Michail Kletcherov (BUL)	0	0	—	—	—	0	—	—	—	—	—	0	—	0	—	—	—	0	—	0	0	15	—	—	—	—	15
85	Lorenz Wäger (AUT)	—	—	—	—	—	—	—	—	—	—	—	—	—	—	—	3	—	11	0	—	—	—	—	0	0	—	14
86	Christian Gow (CAN)	0	0	—	0	2	4	DNF	—	7	0	—	0	—	0	—	0	—	—	—	—	—	0	—	—	—	—	13
87	Dzmitry Abasheu (BLR)	—	—	—	—	—	—	—	—	—	—	—	0	—	—	—	12	—	—	—	—	—	—	—	—	—	—	12
88	Thomas Bormolini (ITA)	0	0	—	0	—	—	—	—	0	0	—	0	—	—	—	6	—	0	1	0	4	0	—	—	—	—	11
89	Antonin Guigonnat (FRA)	0	0	—	0	—	—	—	—	0	10	—	0	—	0	0	—	—	—	—	—	—	—	—	—	—	—	10
89	Roland Lessing (EST)	0	—	—	0	—	0	—	—	—	—	—	—	—	0	—	—	—	—	—	4	6	0	—	—	—	—	10
#	Name	ÖST IN	ÖST SP	ÖST PU	HOC SP	HOC PU	POK SP	POK PU	POK MS	RU1 SP	RU1 PU	RU1 MS	RU2 IN	RU2 MS	ANT SP	ANT PU	CAN SP	CAN MS	PRE SP	PRE PU	OSL SP	OSL PU	OSL IN	OSL MS	KHA SP	KHA PU	KHA MS	Total
91	Matvey Eliseev (RUS)	—	—	—	—	—	—	—	—	0	3	—	—	—	—	—	—	—	—	—	—	—	—	—	0	6	—	9
92	Dmytro Rusinov (UKR)	0	—	—	—	—	—	—	—	—	—	—	—	—	—	—	—	—	0	8	—	—	—	—	—	—	—	8
92	Florian Graf (GER)	—	—	—	—	—	—	—	—	—	—	—	—	—	—	—	—	—	—	—	—	—	—	—	8	0	—	8
92	George Buta (ROU)	8	0	—	0	0	0	0	—	0	—	—	0	—	0	—	—	—	0	—	0	—	0	—	0	—	—	8
92	Maxim Braun (KAZ)	—	8	0	0	0	0	—	—	0	—	—	—	—	—	—	0	—	—	—	0	—	—	—	0	—	—	8
92	Rene Zahkna (EST)	—	—	—	—	—	—	—	—	0	—	—	7	—	0	1	0	—	0	—	—	—	0	—	0	0	—	8
92	Rok Tršan (SLO)	0	0	—	0	—	0	—	—	0	—	—	0	—	0	—	0	—	0	0	0	—	8	—	—	—	—	8
98	Miroslav Matiaško (SVK)	0	0	—	0	—	—	—	—	0	0	—	6	—	0	—	0	—	0	—	—	—	0	—	—	—	—	6
99	Sergey Bocharnikov (BLR)	0	—	—	—	—	—	—	—	5	0	—	—	—	0	—	—	—	—	—	—	—	—	—	—	—	—	5
99	Vetle Sjåstad Christiansen (NOR)	—	—	—	—	—	—	—	—	—	—	—	—	—	—	—	5	—	—	—	—	—	—	—	—	—	—	5
101	Matthias Bischl (GER)	—	—	—	0	0	—	—	—	—	—	—	—	—	—	—	—	—	—	—	—	—	—	—	4	0	—	4
101	Peppe Femling (SWE)	0	0	—	0	—	0	—	—	0	—	—	—	—	—	—	—	—	—	—	—	—	4	—	—	—	—	4
103	Ruslan Tkalenko (UKR)	—	—	—	—	—	—	—	—	—	—	—	—	—	—	—	—	—	—	—	—	—	3	—	0	0	—	3
104	Jeremy Finello (SUI)	0	0	—	0	—	0	—	—	0	0	—	1	—	0	—	DNS	—	—	—	—	—	0	—	—	—	—	1
104	Martin Jäger (SUI)	DNS	0	—	0	0	0	0	—	0	—	—	0	—	0	—	0	—	1	0	0	0	—	—	—	—	—	1
104	Petr Pashchenko (RUS)	—	—	—	—	—	—	—	—	—	—	—	—	—	—	—	—	—	—	—	—	—	—	—	0	1	—	1
