= 2016–17 Biathlon World Cup – Overall Men =

== 2015–16 Top 3 standings ==
Medal	Athlete	Points
Gold:	(France) Martin Fourcade	1151
Silver:	(Norway) Johannes Thingnes Bø	820
Bronze:	(Russia) Anton Shipulin	806

== Events summary ==
Event	Winner	Second	Third
Östersund 20 km Individual details	Martin Fourcade; France	Johannes Thingnes Bø; Norway	Vladimir Chepelin; Belarus
Östersund 10 km Sprint details	Martin Fourcade; France	Fredrik Lindström; Sweden	Arnd Peiffer; Germany
Östersund 12.5 km Pursuit details	Anton Babikov; Russia	Maxim Tsvetkov; Russia	Martin Fourcade; France
Pokljuka 10 km Sprint details	Martin Fourcade; France	Johannes Thingnes Bø; Norway	Anton Shipulin; Russia
Pokljuka 12.5 km Pursuit details	Martin Fourcade; France	Emil Hegle Svendsen; Norway	Anton Shipulin; Russia
Nové Město 10 km Sprint details	Martin Fourcade; France	Anton Shipulin; Russia	Emil Hegle Svendsen; Norway
Nové Město 12.5 km Pursuit details	Martin Fourcade; France	Anton Shipulin; Russia	Quentin Fillon Maillet; France
Nové Město 15 km Mass start details	Martin Fourcade; France	Simon Schempp; Germany	Anton Babikov; Russia
Oberhof 10 km Sprint details	Julian Eberhard; Austria	Michal Šlesingr; Czech Republic	Dominik Windisch; Italy
Oberhof 12.5 km Pursuit details	Martin Fourcade; France	Arnd Peiffer; Germany	Dominik Windisch; Italy
Oberhof 15 km Mass start details	Simon Schempp; Germany	Erik Lesser; Germany	Martin Fourcade; France
Ruhpolding 10 km Sprint details	Martin Fourcade; France	Julian Eberhard; Austria	Emil Hegle Svendsen; Norway
Ruhpolding 12.5 km Pursuit details	Martin Fourcade; France	Emil Hegle Svendsen; Norway	Michal Krčmář; Czech Republic
Antholz-Anterselva 20 km Individual details	Anton Shipulin; Russia	Martin Fourcade; France	Serhiy Semenov; Ukraine
Antholz-Anterselva 15 km Mass start details	Johannes Thingnes Bø; Norway	Quentin Fillon Maillet; France	Anton Shipulin; Russia
World Championships 10 km Sprint details	Benedikt Doll; Germany	Johannes Thingnes Bø; Norway	Martin Fourcade; France
World Championships 12.5 km Pursuit details	Martin Fourcade; France	Johannes Thingnes Bø; Norway	Ole Einar Bjørndalen; Norway
World Championships 20 km Individual details	Lowell Bailey; United States	Ondřej Moravec; Czech Republic	Martin Fourcade; France
World Championships 15 km Mass start details	Simon Schempp; Germany	Johannes Thingnes Bø; Norway	Simon Eder; Austria
Pyeongchang 10 km Sprint details	Julian Eberhard; Austria	Lowell Bailey; United States	Martin Fourcade; France
Pyeongchang 12.5 km Pursuit details	Martin Fourcade; France	Anton Shipulin; Russia	Julian Eberhard; Austria
Kontiolahti 10 km Sprint details	Martin Fourcade; France	Ondřej Moravec; Czech Republic	Emil Hegle Svendsen; Norway
Kontiolahti 12.5 km Pursuit details	Arnd Peiffer; Germany	Simon Eder; Austria	Emil Hegle Svendsen; Norway
Oslo Holmenkollen 10 km Sprint details	Johannes Thingnes Bø; Norway	Martin Fourcade; France	Anton Shipulin; Russia
Oslo Holmenkollen 12.5 km Pursuit details	Anton Shipulin; Russia	Martin Fourcade; France	Johannes Thingnes Bø; Norway
Oslo Holmenkollen 15 km Mass start details	Martin Fourcade; France	Andrejs Rastorgujevs; Latvia	Simon Eder; Austria

== Standings ==
For each event, a first place gives 60 points, a 2nd place 54 pts, a 3rd place 48 pts, a 4th place 43 pts, a fifth place 40 pts, a 6th place 38 pts, 7th 36 pts 8th 34 points, 9th 32 points, 10th 31 points, then linearly decreasing by one point down to the 40th place. Equal placings (ties) give an equal number of points. The sum of all WC points of the season, minus the points from 2 events in which the biathlete got the worst scores, gives the biathlete's total WC score.

#	Name	ÖST IN	ÖST SP	ÖST PU	POK SP	POK PU	NOV SP	NOV PU	NOV MS	OBE SP	OBE PU	OBE MS	RUH SP	RUH PU	ANT IN	ANT MS	HOC SP	HOC PU	HOC IN	HOC MS	PYE SP	PYE PU	KON SP	KON PU	OSL SP	OSL PU	OSL MS	Total
1.	Martin Fourcade (FRA)	60	60	48	60	60	60	60	60	~~34~~	60	48	60	60	54	~~40~~	48	60	48	40	48	60	60	40	54	54	60	1322
2	Anton Shipulin (RUS)	30	~~13~~	34	48	48	54	54	29	17	25	27	18	43	60	48	20	43	36	43	18	54	~~12~~	31	48	60	30	918
3	Johannes Thingnes Bø (NOR)	54	11	31	54	43	43	40	32	DNS	—	—	4	26	27	60	54	54	34	54	—	—	43	36	60	48	4	812
4	Arnd Peiffer (GER)	~~9~~	48	43	22	29	30	15	27	26	54	23	43	40	32	20	29	22	~~7~~	31	10	20	40	60	27	15	40	746
5	Simon Schempp (GER)	0	20	32	38	40	24	43	54	38	21	60	40	36	40	36	32	31	28	60	—	—	—	—	17	30	21	741
6	Julian Eberhard (AUT)	23	40	14	0	20	32	28	23	60	22	18	54	28	—	32	36	34	27	22	60	48	32	DNS	31	38	10	732
7	Emil Hegle Svendsen (NOR)	—	27	25	43	54	48	DNS	—	36	43	36	48	54	—	43	5	DNS	14	6	—	—	48	48	21	25	43	667
8	Lowell Bailey (USA)	26	28	26	23	23	21	32	20	—	—	—	23	15	31	25	43	38	60	38	54	32	25	14	0	18	26	641
9	Ole Einar Bjørndalen (NOR)	40	29	29	36	32	27	29	36	9	4	40	34	7	43	31	34	48	~~0~~	16	15	22	34	12	~~0~~	DNS	24	631
10	Erik Lesser (GER)	10	26	40	34	30	26	17	30	40	40	54	14	18	20	34	4	13	43	20	40	28	—	—	0	13	27	621
11	Benedikt Doll (GER)	11	43	~~8~~	20	19	16	26	14	~~0~~	17	38	21	19	30	22	60	30	22	32	21	34	11	21	30	23	28	608
12	Ondřej Moravec (CZE)	24	6	23	10	27	34	0	43	22	20	28	0	4	0	16	40	40	54	25	—	—	54	43	36	34	14	597
13	Simon Eder (AUT)	29	17	18	30	25	0	10	16	0	DNS	—	—	—	—	—	19	29	29	48	34	43	38	54	29	36	48	552
14	Dominik Windisch (ITA)	~~0~~	38	16	~~0~~	12	20	16	25	48	48	6	0	30	17	29	23	16	20	14	38	19	24	17	1	26	22	525
15	Jean-Guillaume Béatrix (FRA)	6	18	30	14	2	10	34	28	25	26	43	8	24	18	38	14	28	19	23	24	30	0	—	22	1	36	521
16	Dominik Landertinger (AUT)	0	8	20	0	14	—	—	—	30	11	29	32	38	11	—	24	20	15	36	43	36	30	18	43	29	25	512
17	Michal Krčmář (CZE)	0	3	36	32	31	13	31	22	20	13	32	12	48	34	6	~~0~~	—	38	18	0	0	27	9	13	28	32	498
18	Evgeniy Garanichev (RUS)	18	0	11	6	15	0	30	—	—	—	—	22	16	29	26	31	21	21	30	32	40	18	29	34	32	34	495
19	Maxim Tsvetkov (RUS)	19	31	54	28	34	29	27	18	28	31	30	10	2	36	28	0	—	—	10	27	21	0	DNS	DNS	—	6	469
20	Quentin Fillon Maillet (FRA)	13	~~0~~	~~DNF~~	40	21	25	48	34	14	16	DNF	15	9	26	54	0	19	24	26	9	16	0	DNF	25	14	18	466
21	Andrejs Rastorgujevs (LAT)	38	23	10	0	—	38	36	12	—	—	—	19	31	0	10	0	4	0	—	26	27	36	32	18	31	54	445
22	Michal Šlesingr (CZE)	16	24	19	26	22	0	22	2	54	36	4	~~0~~	—	0	14	0	11	23	28	17	17	6	8	28	7	38	422
23	Serhiy Semenov (UKR)	~~0~~	4	~~0~~	16	17	36	20	24	27	12	16	0	0	48	23	0	26	40	8	16	4	0	0	40	24	20	421
24	Anton Babikov (RUS)	0	36	60	20	7	0	7	48	23	38	34	18	DNS	2	27	0	2	—	—	0	26	3	DNS	0	17	31	399
25	Simon Desthieux (FRA)	0	34	27	21	26	6	18	31	0	—	10	—	—	23	21	7	14	0	—	30	38	17	29	32	DNF	12	396
26	Krasimir Anev (BUL)	36	0	0	15	16	3	4	—	—	—	—	11	11	38	—	38	36	25	29	0	6	20	25	23	19	8	363
27	Dmytro Pidruchnyi (UKR)	—	32	28	0	11	19	24	40	DNS	—	8	36	23	0	18	13	27	0	12	25	11	15	20	0	—	—	362
28	Fredrik Lindström (SWE)	32	54	3	—	—	0	2	—	7	0	—	28	22	19	24	11	24	3	34	—	—	0	0	26	43	23	355
29	Lukas Hofer (ITA)	22	1	1	0	13	9	11	—	43	29	25	0	3	DNS	—	0	DNS	7	—	29	31	26	38	20	40	2	350
30	Benjamin Weger (SUI)	31	16	0	17	24	0	—	—	32	30	31	30	21	22	8	0	0	31	—	0	0	1	10	14	10	—	328
#	Name	ÖST IN	ÖST SP	ÖST PU	POK SP	POK PU	NOV SP	NOV PU	NOV MS	OBE SP	OBE PU	OBE MS	RUH SP	RUH PU	ANT IN	ANT MS	HOC SP	HOC PU	HOC IN	HOC MS	PYE SP	PYE PU	KON SP	KON PU	OSL SP	OSL PU	OSL MS	Total
31	Lars Helge Birkeland (NOR)	43	14	13	9	28	5	6	26	—	—	—	31	5	28	30	—	—	32	—	—	—	20	24	—	—	—	314
32	Vladimir Iliev (BUL)	7	0	—	0	—	40	19	6	31	24	20	13	29	0	—	28	23	17	21	0	DNS	8	11	0	12	—	309
33	Michael Rösch (BEL)	0	0	2	25	38	11	38	10	5	27	22	7	10	0	—	0	10	0	—	0	—	31	19	0	—	—	255
34	Daniel Mesotitsch (AUT)	15	5	7	27	0	15	13	—	16	19	14	26	32	0	—	0	0	26	—	—	—	10	13	0	—	—	238
35	Matvey Eliseev (RUS)	—	25	24	31	36	0	9	38	0	—	26	0	DNS	0	—	—	—	—	—	—	—	14	22	10	0	—	235
36	Tarjei Bø (NOR)	—	—	—	—	—	—	—	—	—	—	—	—	—	—	—	27	32	—	27	—	—	9	30	38	27	29	219
37	Artem Pryma (UKR)	0	21	17	2	18	18	14	—	0	32	—	6	14	0	—	—	—	—	—	31	8	0	5	2	20	—	208
38	Simon Fourcade (FRA)	28	31	38	12	0	0	—	—	—	—	—	0	25	15	—	0	—	—	—	20	25	0	—	0	6	—	200
39	Serafin Wiestner (SUI)	0	15	0	24	0	17	12	—	0	—	—	0	0	0	—	23	15	0	4	36	15	0	—	12	9	—	182
40	Erlend Bjøntegaard (NOR)	0	19	4	3	9	31	25	21	11	1	—	20	34	0	—	—	—	—	—	0	—	—	—	—	—	—	178
41	Henrik L'Abée-Lund (NOR)	0	0	22	0	—	—	—	—	21	34	21	0	20	9	—	—	—	—	—	3	24	—	—	8	16	—	178
42	Klemen Bauer (SLO)	8	0	—	29	0	4	0	—	0	—	—	27	DNF	0	—	8	25	0	24	0	3	21	1	24	3	—	177
43	Sebastian Samuelsson (SWE)	—	22	21	11	6	28	23	4	—	—	—	5	0	16	—	0	—	0	—	0	0	16	15	0	2	—	169
44	Dmitry Malyshko (RUS)	0	10	15	—	—	0	0	—	30	23	24	38	27	0	—	—	—	—	—	—	—	0	—	—	—	—	167
45	Vetle Sjåstad Christiansen (NOR)	—	—	—	—	—	—	—	—	10	14	—	—	—	—	—	—	—	—	—	23	29	28	34	0	11	—	149
46	Tim Burke (USA)	25	12	6	0	0	DNS	—	—	6	15	—	29	17	7	—	1	9	5	—	—	—	—	—	—	—	—	132
47	Vladimir Chepelin (BLR)	48	0	0	0	—	8	8	—	0	—	—	24	12	3	—	0	—	10	—	7	5	0	—	—	—	—	125
48	Roman Rees (GER)	0	0	5	—	—	—	—	—	—	—	—	—	—	—	—	—	—	—	—	28	18	29	27	5	0	—	112
49	Mario Dolder (SUI)	0	0	0	13	8	1	0	—	0	0	—	16	13	0	—	26	12	0	2	0	0	5	7	0	0	—	103
50	Scott Gow (CAN)	0	0	0	18	0	23	1	—	0	0	—	0	0	24	2	16	0	0	—	14	0	0	—	0	—	—	98
51	Florian Graf (GER)	34	0	0	0	1	—	—	—	0	0	—	—	—	—	—	—	—	—	—	12	12	22	16	—	—	—	97
52	Vladimir Semakov (UKR)	0	0	—	—	—	—	—	—	13	28	12	0	—	25	12	0	—	—	—	0	0	0	0	0	—	—	90
53	Cornel Puchianu (ROU)	27	0	—	7	0	0	—	—	0	—	—	0	—	0	—	21	3	0	—	0	—	0	—	15	DNS	—	73
54	Lorenz Wäger (AUT)	—	—	—	—	—	0	—	—	—	—	—	—	—	21	4	—	—	—	—	20	7	0	—	9	8	—	69
55	Fabien Claude (FRA)	0	2	12	0	DNF	—	—	—	0	18	—	0	8	4	—	—	—	16	—	0	0	0	6	1	0	—	67
56	Alexey Volkov (RUS)	—	—	—	—	—	—	—	—	—	—	—	—	—	—	—	—	—	30	—	—	—	—	—	11	22	—	63
57	Leif Nordgren (USA)	DNS	—	—	—	—	—	—	—	—	—	—	0	—	12	—	15	0	18	—	4	13	0	0	0	—	—	62
58	Sergey Bocharnikov (BLR)	0	—	—	0	0	—	—	—	0	5	—	0	0	0	—	0	1	1	—	11	23	0	0	19	0	—	60
59	Christian Gow (CAN)	0	0	—	8	10	DNS	—	—	0	—	—	0	—	0	—	9	18	DNF	—	0	9	0	4	0	—	—	58
60	Matthias Bischl (GER)	—	—	—	—	—	0	5	—	19	6	—	25	0	0	—	—	—	—	—	—	—	—	—	—	—	—	55
#	Name	ÖST IN	ÖST SP	ÖST PU	POK SP	POK PU	NOV SP	NOV PU	NOV MS	OBE SP	OBE PU	OBE MS	RUH SP	RUH PU	ANT IN	ANT MS	HOC SP	HOC PU	HOC IN	HOC MS	PYE SP	PYE PU	KON SP	KON PU	OSL SP	OSL PU	OSL MS	Total
61	Timofey Lapshin (KOR)	—	—	—	—	—	—	—	—	—	—	—	—	—	—	—	—	—	—	—	—	—	23	26	0	4	—	53
62	Fredrik Gjesbakk (NOR)	—	—	—	—	—	0	—	—	—	—	—	—	—	—	—	—	—	—	—	0	—	—	—	16	21	16	53
63	Jaroslav Soukup (CZE)	0	0	—	—	—	22	21	8	0	—	—	0	—	1	—	—	—	—	—	0	—	0	—	0	0	—	52
64	Tomáš Hasilla (SVK)	14	0	0	6	4	0	0	—	—	—	—	0	—	0	—	25	0	0	—	0	0	0	—	0	—	—	49
65	Kauri Kõiv (EST)	20	0	—	0	—	0	—	—	0	—	—	—	—	0	—	12	6	11	—	0	—	—	—	0	—	—	49
66	Tomáš Krupčík (CZE)	—	—	—	0	3	—	—	—	—	—	—	—	—	—	—	—	—	9	—	22	14	—	—	—	—	—	48
67	Yan Savitskiy (KAZ)	0	0	—	0	—	0	0	—	1	0	—	0	6	0	—	17	8	8	—	0	0	4	DNS	—	—	—	44
68	Adam Václavík (CZE)	0	0	0	0	0	—	—	—	24	8	—	2	1	0	—	7	0	—	—	0	0	0	—	0	0	—	42
69	Vitaliy Kilchytskyy (UKR)	0	7	0	0	DNS	14	0	—	18	0	—	0	DNS	—	—	—	—	—	—	—	—	—	—	—	—	—	39
70	Anton Sinapov (BUL)	4	0	—	0	0	0	0	—	0	—	—	0	—	—	—	30	DNF	2	—	0	2	0	—	0	0	—	38
71	Sean Doherty (USA)	—	—	—	—	—	—	—	—	0	—	—	1	0	5	—	2	0	0	—	0	—	0	23	6	0	—	37
72	Tomas Kaukėnas (LTU)	0	0	0	0	—	0	—	—	0	—	—	9	0	0	—	10	0	0	—	0	—	13	0	0	—	—	32
72	Vegard Gjermundshaug (NOR)	17	—	—	—	—	—	—	—	—	—	—	—	—	13	—	—	—	—	—	1	1	—	—	—	—	—	32
74	Tuomas Grönman (FIN)	21	0	—	0	—	—	—	—	—	—	—	0	0	10	—	0	—	—	—	0	—	0	—	0	—	—	31
75	Martin Otčenáš (SVK)	12	0	—	0	0	0	0	—	0	—	—	0	—	0	—	0	17	0	—	0	—	0	—	0	—	—	29
76	Brendan Green (CAN)	0	9	0	0	0	0	0	—	0	—	—	0	—	0	—	3	0	0	—	13	0	0	0	0	—	—	25
77	Matej Kazár (SVK)	5	0	—	0	—	0	0	—	0	2	—	0	—	0	—	0	—	12	—	0	—	0	—	0	0	—	19
78	Remus Faur (ROU)	—	0	—	0	—	0	—	—	0	0	—	0	—	0	—	18	0	0	—	0	—	0	DNS	0	—	—	18
79	Yury Shopin (RUS)	0	—	—	0	—	—	—	—	8	10	—	—	—	—	—	—	—	—	—	0	0	—	—	—	—	—	18
80	Dzmitry Abasheu (BLR)	—	—	—	—	—	—	—	—	—	—	—	0	—	0	—	—	—	13	—	0	—	0	3	0	0	—	16
81	Jeremy Finello (SUI)	0	0	—	0	0	0	—	—	—	—	—	—	—	0	—	0	—	0	—	6	10	0	—	—	—	—	16
82	Grzegorz Guzik (POL)	0	0	—	0	—	0	—	—	15	0	—	0	—	0	—	0	0	0	—	0	0	0	—	0	—	—	15
83	Peppe Femling (SWE)	0	—	—	0	—	0	0	—	—	—	—	—	—	14	—	—	—	—	—	0	—	—	—	0	—	—	14
84	David Komatz (AUT)	—	—	—	—	—	12	0	—	0	—	—	0	0	0	—	—	—	—	—	—	—	—	—	0	—	—	12
85	Martin Jäger (SUI)	—	—	—	—	—	—	—	—	12	0	—	—	—	—	—	—	—	—	—	—	—	—	—	0	—	—	12
86	Antonin Guigonnat (FRA)	—	—	—	—	—	—	—	—	3	9	—	—	—	—	—	—	—	—	—	—	—	—	—	—	—	—	12
87	Giuseppe Montello (ITA)	0	0	—	0	—	0	—	—	0	0	—	0	—	0	—	0	7	0	—	5	0	0	—	0	—	—	12
88	Olli Hiidensalo (FIN)	0	0	0	0	0	2	3	—	—	—	—	0	—	0	—	0	5	0	—	—	—	2	0	0	—	—	12
89	Jesper Nelin (SWE)	0	0	9	0	—	DNS	—	—	—	—	—	0	0	0	—	0	0	0	—	DNS	—	—	—	0	—	—	9
90	Maksim Varabei (BLR)	1	0	—	0	—	0	0	—	0	—	—	—	—	0	—	0	—	—	—	8	0	0	—	0	—	—	9
#	Name	ÖST IN	ÖST SP	ÖST PU	POK SP	POK PU	NOV SP	NOV PU	NOV MS	OBE SP	OBE PU	OBE MS	RUH SP	RUH PU	ANT IN	ANT MS	HOC SP	HOC PU	HOC IN	HOC MS	PYE SP	PYE PU	KON SP	KON PU	OSL SP	OSL PU	OSL MS	Total
91	Matthias Dorfer (GER)	—	—	—	4	5	0	—	—	—	—	—	—	—	—	—	—	—	—	—	—	—	—	—	—	—	—	9
92	Paul Schommer (USA)	—	—	—	—	—	—	—	—	—	—	—	—	—	8	—	—	—	—	—	0	—	0	—	0	—	—	8
93	Alexandr Loginov (RUS)	—	—	—	—	—	—	—	—	—	—	—	—	—	—	—	—	—	0	—	—	—	—	—	3	5	—	8
94	Raman Yaliotnau (BLR)	0	0	0	0	0	7	0	—	0	DNF	—	0	—	—	—	0	—	0	—	—	—	—	—	—	—	—	7
95	Philipp Nawrath (GER)	—	—	—	—	—	—	—	—	—	—	—	—	—	—	—	—	—	—	—	—	—	7	0	0	0	—	7
96	Russell Currier (USA)	0	0	—	0	—	0	LAP	—	0	7	—	0	—	—	—	—	—	—	—	—	—	—	—	—	—	—	7
97	Miha Dovzan (SLO)	0	—	—	0	—	0	0	—	0	—	—	0	—	0	—	0	—	0	—	0	—	0	—	7	0	—	7
98	Thomas Bormolini (ITA)	3	0	—	0	—	0	—	—	0	—	—	0	0	0	—	0	0	0	—	0	—	0	—	4	0	—	7
99	Lenart Oblak (SLO)	—	0	—	—	—	0	0	—	DNS	—	—	—	—	6	—	—	—	0	—	0	—	0	—	0	—	—	6
100	Dimitar Gerdzhikov (BUL)	—	0	0	0	—	0	DNS	—	0	3	—	0	—	0	—	0	—	0	—	2	0	0	0	0	DNS	—	5
101	Torstein Stenersen (SWE)	0	0	—	0	—	—	—	—	0	—	—	0	DNS	—	—	0	0	4	—	0	—	0	—	—	—	—	4
102	Krešimir Crnković (CRO)	0	0	—	0	—	0	—	—	4	DNS	—	0	—	—	—	0	—	0	—	—	—	—	—	—	—	—	4
103	Felix Leitner (AUT)	DNS	0	0	2	0	0	—	—	2	0	—	0	—	—	—	—	—	—	—	—	—	—	—	—	—	—	4
104	Michael Willeitner (GER)	—	—	—	—	—	—	—	—	—	—	—	3	0	0	—	—	—	—	—	—	—	—	—	—	—	—	3
105	Rok Tršan (SLO)	0	0	0	0	—	0	—	—	0	—	—	0	—	—	—	0	—	—	—	0	—	0	2	0	0	—	2
106	Mitja Drinovec (SLO)	2	0	—	0	—	—	—	—	—	—	—	—	—	DNS	—	—	—	—	—	—	—	—	—	—	—	—	2
