= 2017–18 Biathlon World Cup – Overall Men =

== 2016–17 Top 3 standings ==
Medal	Athlete	Points
Gold:	(France) Martin Fourcade	1322
Silver:	(Russia) Anton Shipulin	918
Bronze:	(Norway) Johannes Thingnes Bø	812

== Events summary ==
Event	Winner	Second	Third
Östersund 20 km Individual details	Johannes Thingnes Bø; Norway	Quentin Fillon Maillet; France	Martin Fourcade; France
Östersund 10 km Sprint details	Tarjei Bø; Norway	Martin Fourcade; France	Erik Lesser; Germany
Östersund 12.5 km Pursuit details	Martin Fourcade; France	Jakov Fak; Slovenia	Quentin Fillon Maillet; France
Hochfilzen 10 km Sprint details	Johannes Thingnes Bø; Norway	Martin Fourcade; France	Jakov Fak; Slovenia
Hochfilzen 12.5 km Pursuit details	Johannes Thingnes Bø; Norway	Jakov Fak; Slovenia	Martin Fourcade; France
Annecy 10 km Sprint details	Johannes Thingnes Bø; Norway	Martin Fourcade; France	Antonin Guigonnat; France
Annecy 12.5 km Pursuit details	Johannes Thingnes Bø; Norway	Martin Fourcade; France	Anton Shipulin; Russia
Annecy 15 km Mass start details	Martin Fourcade; France	Johannes Thingnes Bø; Norway	Erik Lesser; Germany
Oberhof 10 km Sprint details	Martin Fourcade; France	Emil Hegle Svendsen; Norway	Johannes Thingnes Bø; Norway
Oberhof 12.5 km Pursuit details	Martin Fourcade; France	Johannes Thingnes Bø; Norway	Tarjei Bø; Norway
Ruhpolding 20 km Individual details	Martin Fourcade; France	Ondřej Moravec; Czech Republic	Johannes Thingnes Bø; Norway
Ruhpolding 15 km Mass start details	Johannes Thingnes Bø; Norway	Martin Fourcade; France	Antonin Guigonnat; France
Antholz-Anterselva 10 km Sprint details	Johannes Thingnes Bø; Norway	Martin Fourcade; France	Arnd Peiffer; Germany
Antholz-Anterselva 12.5 km Pursuit details	Johannes Thingnes Bø; Norway	Martin Fourcade; France	Anton Shipulin; Russia
Antholz-Anterselva 15 km Mass start details	Martin Fourcade; France	Tarjei Bø; Norway	Erlend Bjøntegaard; Norway
Kontiolahti 10 km Sprint details	Anton Shipulin; Russia	Andrejs Rastorgujevs; Latvia	Quentin Fillon Maillet; France
Kontiolahti 15 km Mass start details	Julian Eberhard; Austria	Martin Fourcade; France	Anton Shipulin; Russia
Oslo Holmenkollen 10 km Sprint details	Henrik L'Abée-Lund; Norway	Johannes Thingnes Bø; Norway	Martin Fourcade; France
Oslo Holmenkollen 12.5 km Pursuit details	Martin Fourcade; France	Lukas Hofer; Italy	Johannes Thingnes Bø; Norway
Tyumen 10 km Sprint details	Martin Fourcade; France	Simon Desthieux; France	Fredrik Lindström; Sweden
Tyumen 12.5 km Pursuit details	Martin Fourcade; France	Johannes Thingnes Bø; Norway	Lukas Hofer; Italy
Tyumen 15 km Mass start details	Maxim Tsvetkov; Russia	Erlend Bjøntegaard; Norway	Johannes Thingnes Bø; Norway

== Standings ==
Point system
Place	IN	SP	PU	MS
1	60			
2	54			
3	48			
4	43			
5	40			
6	38			
7	36			
8	34			
9	32			
10	31			
11	30			
12	29			
13	28			
14	27			
15	26			
16	25			
17	24			
18	23			
19	22			
20	21			
21	20			
22	19			18
23	18			16
24	17			14
25	16			12
26	15			10
27	14			8
28	13			6
29	12			4
30	11			2
31	10			—
32	9			—
33	8			—
34	7			—
35	6			—
36	5			—
37	4			—
38	3			—
39	2			—
40	1			—

In each event places 1 to 40 (1 to 30 in a Mass start) are awarded points, a victory being worth 60 points. The full point system is shown in the table on the right. In a Mass start event only 30 athletes are allowed to participate and the points awarded for ranks 22 to 30 differ from the system used in other events. Equal placings (ties) give an equal number of points. An athlete's total World Cup Score is the sum of all World Cup points earned in the season, minus the points from 2 events in which the athlete got their worst scores. Ties in this score are broken by comparing the tied athletes' number of victories. If this number is the same for the athletes in question, the number of second places is compared, and so on. If a tie cannot be broken by this procedure, it remains a tie.

#	Name	ÖST IN	ÖST SP	ÖST PU	HOC SP	HOC PU	ANN SP	ANN PU	ANN MS	OBE SP	OBE PU	RUH IN	RUH MS	ANT SP	ANT PU	ANT MS	KON SP	KON MS	OSL SP	OSL PU	TYU SP	TYU PU	TYU MS	Total
1.	Martin Fourcade (FRA)	48	54	60	54	48	54	54	60	60	60	60	54	54	54	60	DNS	54	48	60	60	60	~~22~~	1116
2	Johannes Thingnes Bø (NOR)	60	30	28	60	60	60	60	54	48	54	48	60	60	60	38	43	~~22~~	54	48	~~27~~	54	48	1027
3	Anton Shipulin (RUS)	26	16	34	32	32	38	48	43	~~13~~	29	0	26	43	48	32	60	48	23	36	31	27	25	697
4	Arnd Peiffer (GER)	~~12~~	~~13~~	26	38	28	19	30	38	29	31	30	36	48	43	22	40	38	38	31	34	38	31	668
5	Lukas Hofer (ITA)	38	18	30	26	36	~~1~~	36	26	38	38	32	27	14	~~5~~	12	32	28	40	54	28	48	36	637
6	Jakov Fak (SLO)	29	31	54	48	54	28	28	34	36	30	27	31	8	DNS	29	23	29	9	22	22	~~7~~	30	602
7	Tarjei Bø (NOR)	21	60	22	27	40	0	21	30	40	48	—	40	19	12	54	8	21	15	29	25	21	38	591
8	Simon Desthieux (FRA)	28	~~2~~	~~3~~	20	27	40	38	24	28	25	22	30	30	34	31	38	20	11	30	54	20	29	579
9	Benedikt Doll (GER)	~~7~~	11	15	0	14	29	34	23	24	32	19	32	28	25	43	18	43	32	34	19	14	43	532
10	Quentin Fillon Maillet (FRA)	54	29	48	3	29	0	—	21	1	1	21	43	15	28	20	48	31	34	14	38	16	24	518
11	Erik Lesser (GER)	24	48	31	34	26	0	9	48	—	—	0	23	26	4	24	36	40	5	16	40	40	32	506
12	Simon Schempp (GER)	25	40	25	43	43	43	40	12	7	DNS	28	38	21	DNS	—	34	25	0	6	24	26	4	484
13	Andrejs Rastorgujevs (LAT)	34	34	21	23	18	17	22	8	—	—	26	21	27	23	8	54	18	26	26	43	24	8	481
14	Lars Helge Birkeland (NOR)	27	12	38	28	31	20	24	25	26	21	—	16	38	32	10	27	12	31	23	~~3~~	28	10	479
15	Benjamin Weger (SUI)	36	23	10	36	19	30	25	40	34	36	—	—	25	29	28	0	10	29	32	13	19	2	476
16	Julian Eberhard (AUT)	43	20	36	30	30	0	DNS	—	23	12	0	24	36	31	4	13	60	43	17	26	8	12	468
17	Henrik L'Abée-Lund (NOR)	19	0	29	40	34	DNS	—	4	3	17	17	2	3	18	30	30	23	60	40	16	29	40	454
18	Simon Eder (AUT)	22	27	27	6	13	15	32	29	—	—	36	29	23	36	26	DNS	—	22	38	14	34	20	449
19	Fredrik Lindström (SWE)	16	36	40	0	25	0	0	27	17	26	3	22	—	—	—	0	26	30	21	48	43	28	408
20	Antonin Guigonnat (FRA)	—	—	—	—	—	48	29	18	0	14	30	48	13	22	16	0	30	7	20	30	36	18	379
21	Dominik Windisch (ITA)	1	0	—	0	—	32	26	36	19	0	12	4	24	24	34	31	36	10	19	21	23	21	373
22	Maxim Tsvetkov (RUS)	20	6	18	21	38	DNS	—	20	0	0	—	—	10	21	—	11	—	14	43	38	32	60	352
23	Alexandr Loginov (RUS)	32	14	6	12	0	23	43	32	18	23	0	8	0	9	23	—	—	—	—	32	30	27	332
24	Emil Hegle Svendsen (NOR)	30	43	43	—	—	—	—	—	54	43	11	14	9	40	36	—	—	—	—	—	—	—	323
25	Anton Babikov (RUS)	40	24	7	11	21	26	18	28	12	0	—	—	34	27	14	0	16	0	2	0	17	26	323
26	Erlend Bjøntegaard (NOR)	—	—	—	0	7	16	31	31	—	—	20	—	5	30	48	17	8	18	7	4	25	54	321
27	Ondřej Moravec (CZE)	11	0	19	7	0	4	0	—	30	28	54	6	31	0	27	21	32	12	12	—	—	—	294
28	Johannes Kühn (GER)	0	32	16	17	0	3	0	—	21	7	25	12	22	13	40	0	4	0	—	29	15	34	290
29	Michal Krčmář (CZE)	0	0	2	15	16	7	19	—	32	34	40	25	0	—	25	0	34	4	0	—	—	—	253
30	Timofey Lapshin (KOR)	—	28	DNF	25	DNS	34	10	6	27	19	—	—	18	DNF	—	26	14	0	—	17	3	—	227
#	Name	ÖST IN	ÖST SP	ÖST PU	HOC SP	HOC PU	ANN SP	ANN PU	ANN MS	OBE SP	OBE PU	RUH IN	RUH MS	ANT SP	ANT PU	ANT MS	KON SP	KON MS	OSL SP	OSL PU	TYU SP	TYU PU	TYU MS	Total
31	Evgeniy Garanichev (RUS)	0	0	12	0	15	22	17	22	—	—	0	—	0	2	—	0	—	36	27	18	18	23	212
32	Tim Burke (USA)	9	0	0	0	—	31	15	—	43	27	5	20	0	20	18	3	—	0	0	—	—	—	191
33	Roman Rees (GER)	—	—	—	—	—	—	—	—	11	22	43	28	12	1	—	14	—	28	25	0	5	—	189
34	Krasimir Anev (BUL)	0	DNS	—	—	—	0	7	—	—	—	31	18	6	26	—	28	24	16	8	10	0	—	174
35	Lowell Bailey (USA)	0	19	24	0	5	6	27	16	—	—	4	—	0	6	—	25	27	0	13	—	—	—	172
36	Sean Doherty (USA)	3	0	—	19	24	24	11	14	0	—	10	—	0	—	—	6	—	27	24	—	—	—	162
37	Dmytro Pidruchnyi (UKR)	—	0	—	29	23	—	—	—	31	40	0	—	0	3	—	0	—	20	3	—	—	—	149
38	Matvey Eliseev (RUS)	—	9	8	24	22	21	16	2	20	15	0	—	0	8	—	0	—	0	—	—	—	—	145
39	Klemen Bauer (SLO)	31	0	0	19	4	0	3	—	2	2	—	—	4	14	—	22	—	24	10	—	—	—	135
40	Jesper Nelin (SWE)	0	21	5	9	20	0	—	—	0	—	—	—	—	—	—	19	—	14	0	9	22	16	135
41	Dominik Landertinger (AUT)	—	—	—	—	—	—	—	—	0	8	38	10	0	19	—	—	—	21	18	20	DNS	—	134
42	Simon Fourcade (FRA)	14	26	32	0	—	0	—	—	—	—	0	—	17	16	21	0	—	—	—	—	—	—	126
43	Ole Einar Bjørndalen (NOR)	23	10	23	13	0	—	—	—	0	5	0	—	—	—	—	29	6	0	—	2	9	—	120
44	Sebastian Samuelsson (SWE)	—	5	11	0	—	18	5	—	4	18	2	—	—	—	—	20	—	6	28	—	—	—	117
45	Artem Pryma (UKR)	18	0	17	—	—	—	—	—	25	16	15	—	0	—	—	0	—	8	15	—	——		114
46	Émilien Jacquelin (FRA)	6	4	13	0	DNS	—	—	—	0	0	0	—	40	38	6	0	—	0	—	0	6	—	113
47	Michal Šlesingr (CZE)	15	3	4	0	1	0	DNS	—	—	—	34	34	0	17	—	DNS	—	—	—	—	—	—	108
48	Sergey Bocharnikov (BLR)	0	0	—	—	—	—	—	—	23	24	18	—	—	—	—	10	—	3	0	11	11	—	100
49	Christian Gow (CAN)	0	15	20	0	0	11	12	—	5	20	7	—	—	—	—	0	—	0	0	—	—	—	90
50	Dmitry Malyshko (RUS)	—	—	—	—	—	—	—	—	—	—	—	—	—	—	—	15	—	25	5	23	13	6	87
51	Mario Dolder (SUI)	0	38	14	0	—	0	—	—	—	—	0	—	0	—	—	5	—	17	9	0	0	—	83
52	Scott Gow (CAN)	0	25	0	0	0	25	14	10	9	0	0	—	—	—	—	0	—	0	0	—	—	—	83
53	Florent Claude (BEL)	—	—	—	—	—	5	23	—	15	10	16	—	—	—	—	0	—	—	—	—	—	—	69
54	Vetle Sjåstad Christiansen (NOR)	—	—	—	—	—	—	—	—	—	—	6	—	—	—	—	—	—	—	—	15	31	14	66
55	Jeremy Finello (SUI)	0	0	—	0	2	0	20	—	14	11	0	—	DNS	—	—	0	—	2	11	0	0	—	60
56	Jean-Guillaume Béatrix (FRA)	10	22	0	2	17	0	4	—	0	—	—	—	—	—	—	—	—	—	—	—	—	—	55
57	Nathan Smith (CAN)	4	17	0	22	10	0	—	—	—	—	—	—	—	—	—	—	—	—	—	—	—	—	53
58	Thomas Bormolini (ITA)	0	1	1	0	11	9	0	—	0	0	8	—	0	—	—	12	—	0	0	0	10	—	52
59	Vladimir Iliev (BUL)	0	0	—	0	—	14	13	—	0	0	1	—	0	—	—	16	—	0	0	1	1	—	46
60	Philipp Nawrath (GER)	0	0	0	32	12	0	0	—	—	—	—	—	—	—	—	—	—	—	—	—	—	—	44
#	Name	ÖST IN	ÖST SP	ÖST PU	HOC SP	HOC PU	ANN SP	ANN PU	ANN MS	OBE SP	OBE PU	RUH IN	RUH MS	ANT SP	ANT PU	ANT MS	KON SP	KON MS	OSL SP	OSL PU	TYU SP	TYU PU	TYU MS	Total
61	Tero Seppälä (FIN)	0	0	—	17	0	10	DNS	—	8	9	0	—	0	0	—	0	—	0	0	0	0	—	44
62	Kalev Ermits (EST)	—	0	0	0	—	27	8	—	0	6	0	—	0	—	—	0	—	0	—	0	—	—	41
63	Michael Rösch (BEL)	0	0	0	14	9	—	—	—	—	—	—	—	1	15	—	—	—	0	0	0	—	—	39
64	Fredrik Gjesbakk (NOR)	—	—	—	—	—	36	2	—	—	—	—	—	—	—	—	—	—	—	—	0	—	—	38
65	Miha Dovzan (SLO)	0	0	—	1	0	0	0	—	0	—	24	—	0	—	—	0	—	0	0	7	4	—	36
66	Martin Otčenáš (SVK)	0	0	—	0	—	12	1	—	—	—	0	—	20	0	—	2	—	0	—	0	—	—	35
67	Alexey Volkov (RUS)	8	—	—	—	—	—	—	—	0	13	14	—	—	—	—	—	—	—	—	—	—	—	35
68	Vladimir Chepelin (BLR)	0	0	—	—	—	—	—	—	0	—	—	—	32	0	2	0	—	—	—	—	—	—	34
69	Vladimir Semakov (UKR)	0	0	—	5	DNS	—	—	—	0	DNS	0	—	29	0	—	0	—	0	—	—	—	—	34
70	Roman Yeremin (KAZ)	—	0	—	0	—	0	—	—	—	—	0	—	0	—	—	0	—	19	DNS	12	0	—	31
71	Leif Nordgren (USA)	0	0	—	0	—	0	0	—	—	—	—	—	0	0	—	24	2	0	1	—	—	—	27
72	Tobias Eberhard (AUT)	—	—	—	0	—	13	0	—	10	3	DNS	—	0	LAP	—	0	—	0	—	—	—	—	26
73	Serafin Wiestner (SUI)	0	0	0	0	—	8	0	—	0	4	13	—	0	—	—	—	—	—	—	—	—	—	25
74	Matej Kazár (SVK)	0	0	0	0	0	0	0	—	—	—	23	—	0	—	—	0	—	0	—	0	0	—	23
75	Roland Lessing (EST)	0	—	—	10	0	—	—	—	0	0	—	—	2	11	—	—	—	—	—	0	0	—	23
76	Grzegorz Guzik (POL)	0	0	—	0	—	0	—	—	0	—	0	—	11	10	—	0	—	0	—	0	—	—	21
77	Felix Leitner (AUT)	13	0	0	0	—	0	—	—	0	—	—	—	—	—	—	—	—	0	0	6	0	—	19
78	Tuomas Grönman (FIN)	0	—	—	—	—	2	0	—	0	0	0	—	16	LAP	—	0	—	0	0	0	—	—	18
79	Serhiy Semenov (UKR)	17	0	—	0	0	—	—	—	—	—	—	—	—	—	—	—	—	—	—	—	—	—	17
80	Jaroslav Soukup (CZE)	0	0	—	—	—	—	—	—	16	0	—	—	—	—	—	0	—	0	—	—	—	—	16
81	Raman Yaliotnau (BLR)	0	8	0	0	—	0	—	—	0	0	0	—	7	0	—	0	—	0	0	0	—	—	15
82	Brendan Green (CAN)	0	0	0	0	8	0	—	—	0	0	0	—	—	—	—	7	—	0	—	—	—	—	15
83	Olli Hiidensalo (FIN)	0	0	—	0	—	0	0	—	0	—	9	—	0	—	—	0	—	1	4	0	0	—	14
84	Petr Pashchenko (RUS)	—	—	—	—	—	—	—	—	—	—	—	—	—	—	—	—	—	—	—	0	12	—	12
85	Fabien Claude (FRA)	—	—	—	—	—	—	—	—	—	—	—	—	—	—	—	—	—	—	—	8	2	—	10
86	Ruslan Tkalenko (UKR)	0	0	—	4	6	0	0	—	0	—	0	—	0	—	—	0	—	0	—	—	—	—	10
87	Tomáš Krupčík (CZE)	0	0	9	0	—	0	0	—	0	0	—	—	—	—	—	—	—	—	—	—	—	—	9
88	Daniel Mesotitsch (AUT)	0	0	—	0	0	—	—	—	0	—	0	—	—	—	—	9	—	0	0	0	0	—	9
89	Mikito Tachizaki (JPN)	0	0	—	8	0	0	—	—	0	—	0	—	—	—	—	—	—	0	—	0	0	—	8
90	Rene Zahkna (EST)	0	7	0	0	—	0	—	—	0	—	0	—	—	—	—	0	—	0	0	0	—	—	7
#	Name	ÖST IN	ÖST SP	ÖST PU	HOC SP	HOC PU	ANN SP	ANN PU	ANN MS	OBE SP	OBE PU	RUH IN	RUH MS	ANT SP	ANT PU	ANT MS	KON SP	KON MS	OSL SP	OSL PU	TYU SP	TYU PU	TYU MS	Total
91	Adam Václavík (CZE)	—	—	—	0	0	0	—	—	0	—	0	—	0	7	—	0	—	0	—	—	—	—	7
92	Anton Sinapov (BUL)	0	0	—	0	—	0	0	—	7	0	—	—	0	—	—	0	—	0	—	0	0	—	7
93	Oskars Muiznieks (LAT)	0	0	—	0	0	0	6	—	0	—	0	—	0	—	—	—	—	—	—	—	—	—	6
94	Maksim Varabei (BLR)	0	0	0	0	—	—	—	—	—	—	—	—	0	—	—	—	—	0	—	5	0	—	5
95	Torstein Stenersen (SWE)	5	—	—	0	—	—	—	—	—	—	0	—	0	—	—	—	—	—	—	—	—	—	5
96	Martin Ponsiluoma (SWE)	—	0	—	—	—	—	—	—	—	—	—	—	—	—	—	4	—	—	—	0	0	—	4
97	Vytautas Strolia (LTU)	0	0	0	0	3	0	0	—	0	—	0	—	0	DNS	—	0	—	0	0	0	—	—	3
98	George Buta (ROU)	2	0	—	0	—	0	—	—	0	—	0	—	—	—	—	0	—	0	—	0	0	—	2
99	Cornel Puchianu (ROU)	0	0	0	0	—	0	—	—	0	—	0	—	0	0	—	1	—	0	—	—	—	—	1
