= Biathlon World Championships 2016 – Men's relay =

Men's relay at the Biathlon World Championships 2016
- Venue: Oslo, Norway
- Date: 12 March
- Competitors: 100 from 25 nations
- Teams: 25
- Winning time: 1:13:16.8

Medalists
gold medal	Ole Einar Bjørndalen; Tarjei Bø; Johannes Thingnes Bø; Emil Hegle Svendsen	Norway
silver medal	Erik Lesser; Benedikt Doll; Arnd Peiffer; Simon Schempp	Germany
bronze medal	Christian Gow; Nathan Smith; Scott Gow; Brendan Green	Canada

The Men's relay event of the Biathlon World Championships 2016 was held on 12 March 2016.

== Results ==
The race was started at 15:30 CET.

Rank	Bib	Team	Time	Penalties (P+S)	Deficit
1st place, gold medalist(s)	1	Norway; Ole Einar Bjørndalen; Tarjei Bø; Johannes Thingnes Bø; Emil Hegle Svendsen	1:14:16.8; 18:09.3; 18:01.9; 18:03.1; 19:02.5	0+1 0+5; 0+0 0+2; 0+1 0+1; 0+0 0+0; 0+0 0+2	
2nd place, silver medalist(s)	4	Germany; Erik Lesser; Benedikt Doll; Arnd Peiffer; Simon Schempp	1:13:28.3; 18:00.2; 18:11.3; 18:32.2; 18:44.6	0+2 0+3; 0+0 0+0; 0+1 0+1; 0+1 0+1; 0+0 0+1	+11.5
3rd place, bronze medalist(s)	9	Canada; Christian Gow; Nathan Smith; Scott Gow; Brendan Green	1:13:40.2; 18:14.9; 17:57.5; 18:36.3; 18:51.5	0+1 0+4; 0+0 0+0; 0+1 0+1; 0+0 0+3; 0+0 0+0	+23.4
4	5	Austria; Sven Grossegger; Simon Eder; Julian Eberhard; Dominik Landertinger	1:14:10.3; 18:32.3; 17:46.2; 19:03.8; 18:48.0	0+3 1+7; 0+0 0+3; 0+1 0+0; 0+2 1+3; 0+0 0+1	+53.5
5	15	Czech Republic; Michal Krčmář; Jaroslav Soukup; Ondřej Moravec; Michal Šlesingr	1:14:11.2; 18:07.7; 18:14.4; 19:03.2; 18:45.9	0+2 0+5; 0+1 0+0; 0+0 0+1; 0+0 0+3; 0+1 0+1	+54.4
6	2	Russia; Maxim Tsvetkov; Evgeniy Garanichev; Anton Babikov; Anton Shipulin	1:14:23.2; 18:25.2; 18:50.8; 18:44.1; 18:23.1	0+4 1+3; 0+0 0+0; 0+0 1+3; 0+2 0+0; 0+2 0+0	+1:06.4
7	17	Sweden; Torstein Stenersen; Jesper Nelin; Peppe Femling; Fredrik Lindström	1:14:23.4; 18:24.3; 18:15.2; 19:10.6; 18:33.3	0+4 0+6; 0+3 0+0; 0+0 0+1; 0+1 0+3; 0+0 0+2	+1:06.6
8	6	United States; Lowell Bailey; Leif Nordgren; Tim Burke; Sean Doherty	1:14:44.1; 18:07.4; 19:09.0; 18:33.0; 18:54.7	0+3 0+2; 0+0 0+1; 0+1 0+1; 0+1 0+0; 0+1 0+0	+1:27.3
9	3	France; Simon Fourcade; Simon Desthieux; Quentin Fillon Maillet; Martin Fourcade	1:15:14.5; 18:31.2; 18:50.8; 18:58.1; 18:54.4	0+2 0+8; 0+1 0+3; 0+0 0+3; 0+1 0+2; 0+0 0+0	+1:57.7
10	10	Switzerland; Jeremy Finello; Serafin Wiestner; Benjamin Weger; Mario Dolder	1:15:22.6; 19:14.2; 17:59.0; 18:45.3; 19:24.1	0+3 0+4; 0+0 0+2; 0+1 0+0; 0+1 0+0; 0+1 0+2	+2:05.8
11	7	Italy; Christian de Lorenzi; Lukas Hofer; Thomas Bormolini; Dominik Windisch	1:15:41.0; 18:31.0; 18:07.6; 19:45.1; 19:17.3	0+2 1+6; 0+0 0+1; 0+1 0+1; 0+0 1+3; 0+0 0+2	+2:24.2
12	11	Slovakia; Matej Kazár; Tomáš Hasilla; Michal Šíma; Martin Otčenáš	1:16:37.7; 18:09.6; 18:30.4; 20:17.4; 19:40.3	0+3 1+5; 0+1 0+0; 0+0 0+0; 0+0 1+3; 0+2 0+2	+3:20.9
13	12	Bulgaria; Krasimir Anev; Anton Sinapov; Vladimir Iliev; Michail Kletcherov	1:16:42.7; 18:21.1; 19:01.4; 18:26.6; 20:53.6	0+5 3+5; 0+0 0+1; 0+3 0+1; 0+2 0+0; 0+0 3+3	+3:25.9
14	18	Estonia; René Zahkna; Kauri Kõiv; Roland Lessing; Kalev Ermits	1:16:46.1; 18:34.6; 18:46.9; 19:40.1; 19:44.5	1+5 0+4; 0+0 0+1; 0+0 0+0; 0+2 0+2; 1+3 0+1	+3:29.3
15	13	Belarus; Vladimir Chepelin; Yuryi Liadov; Dmitriy Dyuzhev; Aliaksandr Darozhka	1:17:22.6; 18:32.6; 19:10.7; 19:33.6; 20:05.7	1+9 0+3; 0+2 0+0; 0+2 0+1; 1+3 0+0; 0+2 0+2	+4:05.8
16	8	Ukraine; Serhiy Semenov; Oleksander Zhyrnyi; Vitaliy Kilchytskyy; Dmytro Pidruchnyi	1:17:39.3; 19:06.6; 19:23.1; 19:37.3; 19:32.3	1+8 0+6; 1+3 0+0; 0+2 0+2; 0+0 0+3; 0+3 0+1	+4:22.5
17	19	Slovenia; Klemen Bauer; Rok Tršan; Lenart Oblak; Miha Dovžan	1:17:49.9; 18:15.9; 19:42.3; 19:30.6; 20:21.1	0+5 0+2; 0+1 0+1; 0+2 0+1; 0+1 0+0; 0+1 0+0	+4:33.1
18	16	Romania; George Buta; Marius Ungureanu; Cornel Puchianu; Remus Faur	1:19:26.1; 19:13.9; 19:42.5; 19:15.1; 21:14.6	0+3 1+3; 0+1 0+0; 0+0 0+0; 0+0 0+0; 0+2 1+3	+6:09.3
19	20	Finland; Tuomas Grönman; Olli Hiidensalo; Teemu Huhtala; Sami Orpana	1:20:30.4; 18:25.5; 19:46.7; 20:54.1; 21:24.1	0+3 1+9; 0+0 0+1; 0+0 1+3; 0+1 0+1; 0+2 0+4	+7:13.6
20	14	Kazakhstan; Yan Savitskiy; Anton Pantov; Maxim Braun; Vassiliy Podkorytov	LAP; 18:14.6; 19:37.6; 21:47.1	0+5 3+10; 0+0 0+1; 0+2 0+0; 0+1 3+4; 0+2 0+5	
21	24	Poland; Mateusz Janik; Grzegorz Guzik; Rafał Penar; Łukasz Szczurek	LAP; 19:59.5; 19:58.8; 20:34.7	0+5 1+8; 0+1 1+3; 0+2 0+1; 0+0 0+2; 0+2 0+2	
22	23	Japan; Junji Nagai; Mikito Tachizaki; Tsukasa Kobonoki; Yuki Nakajima	LAP; 19:14.1; 20:06.9; 20:50.0	2+7 1+6; 0+2 0+1; 0+2 0+2; 2+3 0+0; 0+0 1+3	
23	22	Lithuania; Tomas Kaukėnas; Karol Dombrovski; Vytautas Strolia; Rokas Suslavičius	LAP; 20:32.6; 20:04.1; 20:45.3	3+9 0+6; 1+3 0+3; 0+2 0+0; 2+3 0+2; 0+1 0+1	
24	25	Belgium; Michael Rösch; Thierry Langer; Tom Lahaye-Goffart; Thorsten Langer	LAP; 18:34.3; 20:36.6; 21:30.7	0+5 0+8; 0+0 0+2; 0+2 0+2; 0+0 0+3; 0+3 0+1	
25	21	Latvia; Daumants Lūsa; Ingus Deksnis; Roberts Slotiņš; Aleksandrs Patrijuks	LAP; 20:30.9; 21:56.5; 23:50.6	4+9 5+7; 0+1 0+0; 3+3 0+1; 1+3 4+3; 0+2 1+3	
