= Mateusz Janik =

Polish biathlete

Personal information
- Nationality: Polish
- Born: 20 November 1995 (age 29); Wałbrzych, Poland

Sport
- Country: Poland
- Sport: Biathlon

Mateusz Janik (born 20 November 1995) is a Polish biathlete. He has competed in the Biathlon World Cup, and represented Poland at the Biathlon World Championships 2015 and Biathlon World Championships 2016.

== Biathlon results ==
All results are sourced from the International Biathlon Union.

=== World Championships ===
0 medals

| Event | Individual | Sprint | Pursuit | Mass start | Relay | Mixed relay | Single mixed relay |
|---|---|---|---|---|---|---|---|
| (Finland) 2015 Kontiolahti | — | — | — | — | 20th | — | — |
| (Norway) 2016 Oslo | — | 64th | — | — | 21st | — | — |
| (Sweden) 2019 Östersund | — | — | — | — | 16th | — | — |

*During Olympic seasons competitions are only held for those events not included in the Olympic program.
**The single mixed relay was added as an event in 2019.
