= Teemu Huhtala =

Finnish ice hockey player

- Born: April 4, 1991 (age 34); Tampere, Finland
- Height: 1.82 m (6 ft 0 in)
- Weight: 86 kg (190 lb; 13 st 8 lb)
- Position: Left wing
- Shoots: left
- SM-liiga team Former teams: Ilves; LeKi (Mestis)
- NHL draft: Undrafted
- Playing career: 2011–present

Teemu Huhtala (born April 4, 1991) is a Finnish professional ice hockey player. He currently plays with the Tampereen Ilves team in SM-liiga, the Finnish elite league.

== Career ==
=== Club career ===
Huhtala has been contracted to Ilves since the beginning of his career. In seasons 2007-08 and 2008-09 he tied for best scorer on B-juniors regular season. Huhtala was in 2011 best scorer in A-junior playoffs with 1+6=7. In July 2010 he signed a two-year league contract with Ilves. Nevertheless, he did not make his league debut that season, but he made his first senior appearance with the Mestis-team LeKi and in U20 Finnish national team, in which he scored one assist. Huhtala made his league debut in the first game of 2011-2012 season against local rival Tappara and had ice time of 6.44 minutes. He made his first goal in third game against TPS. Huhtala played five games, scoring one goal and one assist. He played most of the year on loan to LeKi. In May 2012 Huhtala signed a one-year contract extension with Ilves, but it included a trial period until August, after which he did stay on the team.

=== International career ===
Huhtala has played three games in the U20 and seven games in the U18 national team.

== Career statistics ==
Regular season and playoffs

| | | | Regular season | | | | | Playoffs |
| Season | Team | League | GP | G | A | Pts | PIM | GP | G | A | Pts | PIM |
|---|---|---|---|---|---|---|---|---|---|---|---|---|
| 2009-10 | Ilves | Fin-Jr A | 33 | 7 | 15 | 22 | 30 | 5 | 1 | 0 | 1 | 0 |
| 2010-11 | LeKi | Mestis | 1 | 0 | 0 | 0 | 0 |
| 2010-11 | Ilves | Fin-Jr A | 35 | 11 | 8 | 19 | 51 | 7 | 1 | 6 | 7 | 2 |
| 2011-12 | LeKi | Mestis | 30 | 4 | 6 | 10 | 6 |
| 2011-12 | Ilves | SM-liiga | 5 | 1 | 1 | 2 | 0 |
| SM-liiga totals | | | 5 | 1 | 1 | 2 | 0 |
| Mestis totals | | | 33 | 4 | 7 | 11 | 6 |
