= Aliaksandr Darozhka =

Belarusian biathlete (born 1991)

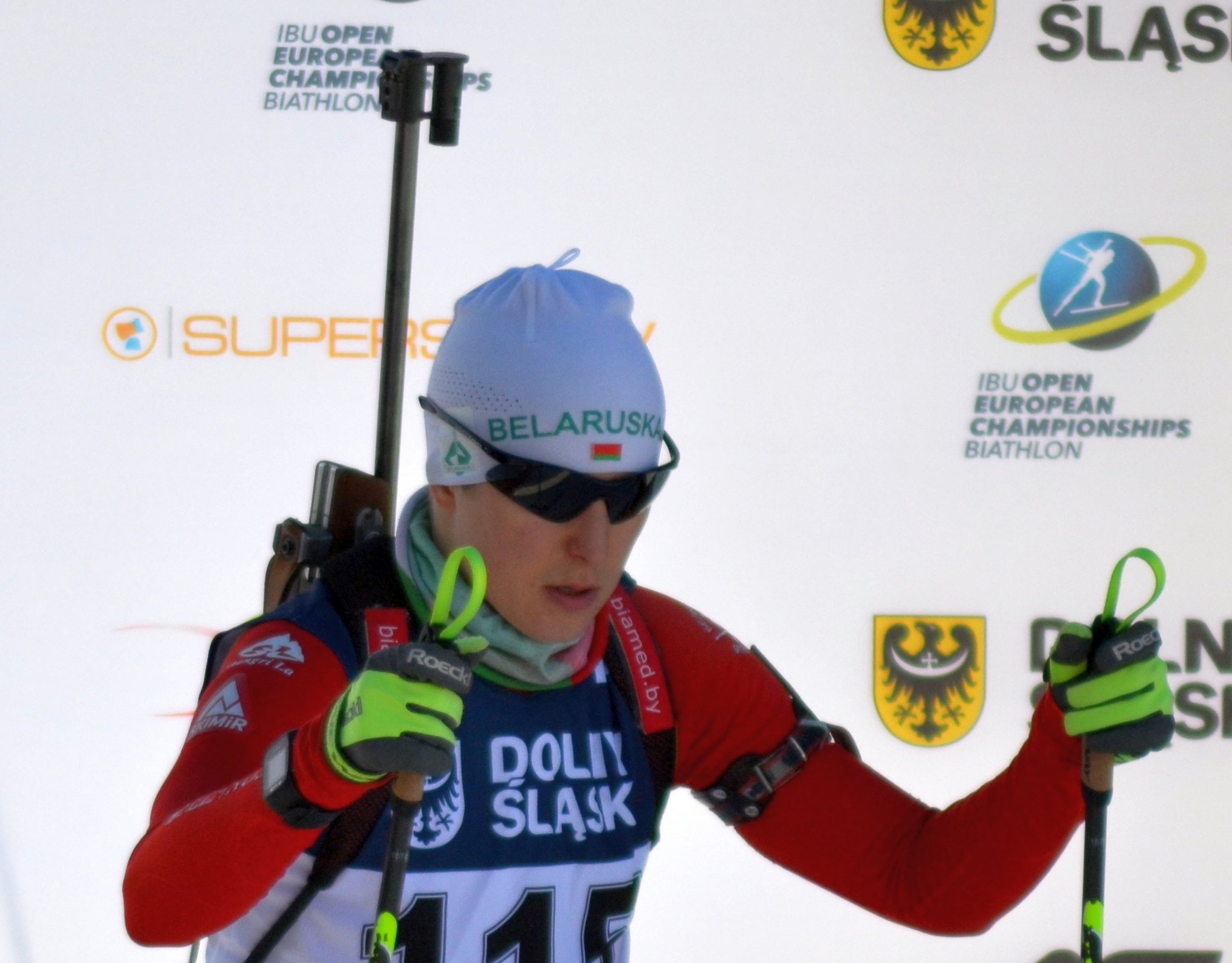
- Darozhka at the 2017 European Championships

Personal information
- Nationality: Belarusian
- Born: 19 August 1991 (age 34) Minsk, Belarus
- Height: 172 cm (5 ft 8 in)
- Weight: 67 kg (148 lb)

Sport
- Sport: Biathlon

Aliaksandr Darozhka (born 19 August 1991) is a Belarusian biathlete. He made his World Cup debut for Belarus in Oberhof in 2014. He competed at the 2014 Winter Olympics in Sochi, in the individual contest.
