= Erik Lesser =

German biathlete (born 1988)

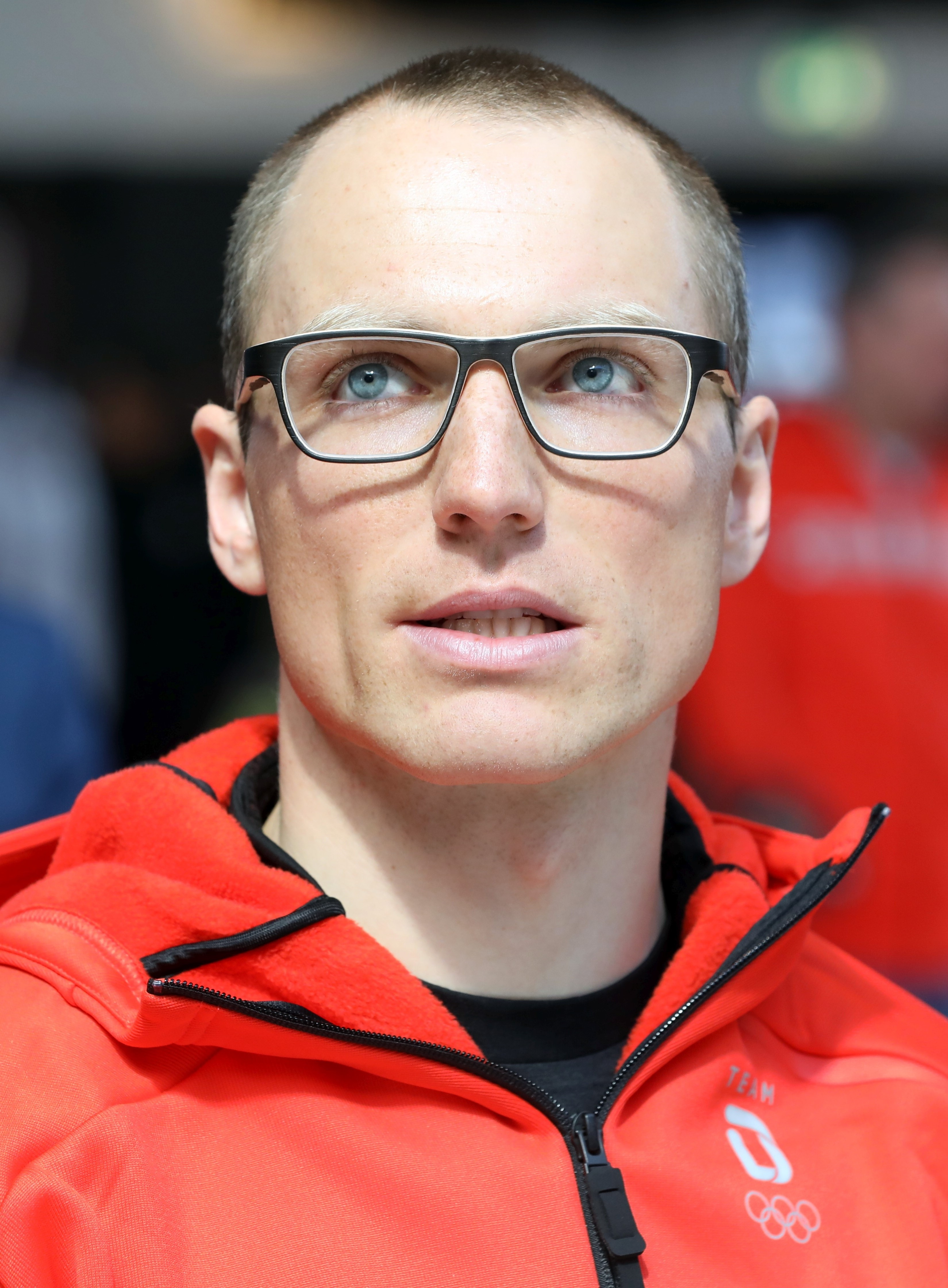
- Lesser in 2018

Personal information
- Nationality: German
- Born: 17 May 1988 (age 38) Suhl, East Germany
- Height: 1.71 m (5 ft 7 in)
- Weight: 71 kg (157 lb)

Sport

Professional information
- Sport: Biathlon
- Club: SV Eintracht Frankenhain
- World Cup debut: 2010

Olympic Games
- Teams: 2 (2014, 2018)
- Medals: 3 (1 gold)

World Championships
- Teams: 7 (2013–2021)
- Medals: 7 (2 gold)

World Cup
- Seasons: 11 (2010/11–2021/22)
- Individual victories: 2
- All victories: 5
- Individual podiums: 11
- All podiums: 40
- Overall titles: 0
- Discipline titles: 0
Medal record
Olympic Games
Gold medal – first place	2014 Sochi	4 × 7.5 km relay
Silver medal – second place	2014 Sochi	20 km individual
Bronze medal – third place	2018 Pyeongchang	4 × 7.5 km relay
World Championships
Gold medal – first place	2015 Kontiolahti	12.5 km pursuit
Gold medal – first place	2015 Kontiolahti	4 × 7.5 km relay
Silver medal – second place	2016 Oslo	4 × 7.5 km relay
Silver medal – second place	2019 Östersund	4 × 7.5 km relay
Silver medal – second place	2020 Antholz	Single mixed relay
Bronze medal – third place	2013 Nové Město	4 × 7.5 km relay
Bronze medal – third place	2020 Antholz	4 × 7.5 km relay
Junior World Championships
Gold medal – first place	2009 Canmore	4 × 7.5 km relay
Bronze medal – third place	2009 Canmore	15 km individual
European Championships
Gold medal – first place	2010 Otepää	4x7.5 km relay
Gold medal – first place	2012 Osrblie	4x7.5 km relay
Silver medal – second place	2010 Otepää	12.5 km pursuit
Bronze medal – third place	2012 Osrblie	20 km individual

Erik Lesser (born 17 May 1988) is a German former biathlete. In 2010, he ran his first single World Cup Race. At the 2014 Winter Olympics in Sochi, he won a silver medal at Men's individual. At the Biathlon World Championships 2013 he won a bronze medal with the German team in Men's relay.

His grandfather Axel Lesser competed in cross-country skiing for East Germany at the 1976 Winter Olympics.

== Career ==
Erik Lesser, grandson of Axel Lesser, lives in Zella-Mehlis and trained mainly in Oberhof. His coach is Mark Kirchner, before Peter Sendel. Lesser began cross-country skiing at the age of six and took up biathlon in 1999 at the age of eleven. A graduate of the Sports Gymnasium Oberhof, he started his competitive career with the club SV Eintracht Frankenhain.

In 2008 he started in Ruhpolding at his first Junior World Championship, where he was seventh in the individual, 16th in the sprint, and eighth in the pursuit. A year later, he won in Canmore a bronze medal in the individual competition, finished eleventh in sprint and pursuit, and took the first leg in the men's relay, where together with Simon Schempp, Benedikt Doll and Florian Graf he took a gold medal. In the summer, he won the Junior Summer World Championships in Oberhof, taking the sprint and pursuit titles on roller skis.

In his World Cup debut in Kontiolahti on 12 March 2010, Lesser finished second in the German mixed relay with Kati Wilhelm, Magdalena Neuner and Simon Schempp. In his debut in solo competition, he finished 44th in the sprint, qualifying him for the subsequent pursuit, where he finished 51st. In 2011, he improved his performance, and at Holmenkollen in Oslo, he finished 24th in the pursuit and 40th in the sprint. At the first race of the 2013 in Östersund, Lesser stood for the first time on the World Cup podium. He finished third in the individual, achieving a clear shoot.

In the 2014 Winter Olympics in Sochi, Erik Lesser won silver medals in the individual competition and with the German men's relay squad. On the final day of the Games, he also participated in the 50km cross-country freestyle race and finished 42nd among 64 starters.

In the 2015 World Championships, Erik Lesser finished fifth in the sprint race. In the ensuing pursuit, he won the gold medal and thus also celebrated his first World Cup victory. With the season's victory in the World Cup, Lesser was a double world champion.

Erik Lesser ended his career on March 20, 2022, with the races at Holmenkollen.

== Biathlon results ==
All results are sourced from the International Biathlon Union.

=== Olympic Games ===
3 medals (1 gold, 1 silver, 1 bronze)

Event	Individual	Sprint	Pursuit	Mass Start	Relay	Mixed Relay
(Russia) 2014 Sochi	Silver	21st	16th	26th	Gold	–
(South Korea) 2018 Pyeongchang	9th	11th	11th	4th	Bronze	4th
(China) 2022 Beijing	67th	—	—	—	4th	—

*The mixed relay was added as an event in 2014.

=== World Championships ===
7 medals (2 gold, 3 silver, 2 bronze)

Event	Individual	Sprint	Pursuit	Mass Start	Relay	Mixed Relay	Single mixed Relay
(Czech Republic) 2013 Nové Město na Moravě	34th	12th	14th	5th	Bronze	—	—N/a
(Finland) 2015 Kontiolahti	18th	5th	Gold	17th	Gold	—	—N/a
(Norway) 2016 Oslo	7th	19th	7th	14th	Silver	—	—N/a
(Austria) 2017 Hochfilzen	4th	37th	28th	21st	4th	—	—N/a
(Sweden) 2019 Östersund	11th	8th	11th	27th	Silver	—	4th
(Italy) 2020 Antholz	—	—	—	—	Bronze	—	Silver
(Slovenia) 2021 Pokljuka	—	66th	—	—	7th	7th	7th

*During Olympic seasons competitions are only held for those events not included in the Olympic program.
**The single mixed relay was added as an event in 2019.

=== World Cup Highlights ===
2010, Finland, Kontiolahti, (silver) 2nd in mixed relay (with Wilhelm / Neuner / Schempp)
2012, Sweden, Östersund, (bronze) 3rd in individual
2013, Germany, Oberhof, (bronze) 3rd in team relay (with Schempp / Peiffer / Graf)
2013, Norway, Holmenkollen, (bronze) 3rd in mass start
2013, Russia, Sochi, (silver) 2nd in team relay (with Birnbacher / Peiffer / Doll)
2013, France, Annecy, (silver) 2nd in pursuit
2013, France, Annecy, (silver) 2nd in team relay (with Birnbacher / Peiffer / Schempp)
2014, Germany, Ruhpolding, (silver) 2nd in team relay (with Stephan / Birnbacher / Schempp)
2014, Italy, Antholz, (bronze) 3rd in team relay (with Birnbacher / Peiffer / Schempp)
2015, Germany, Ruhpolding, (silver) 2nd in team relay (with Birnbacher / Peiffer / Schempp)
2015, Italy, Antholz, (silver) 2nd in team relay (with Boehm / Peiffer / Schempp)
2015, Norway, Holmenkollen, (silver) 2nd in team relay (with Birnbacher / Peiffer / Schempp)
2016, Germany, Ruhpolding, (gold) 1st in mass start
2022, Finland, Kontiolahti, (silver) 2nd in pursuit
2022, Norway, Holmenkollen, (gold) 1st in pursuit
