= Scott Gow =

Canadian biathlete

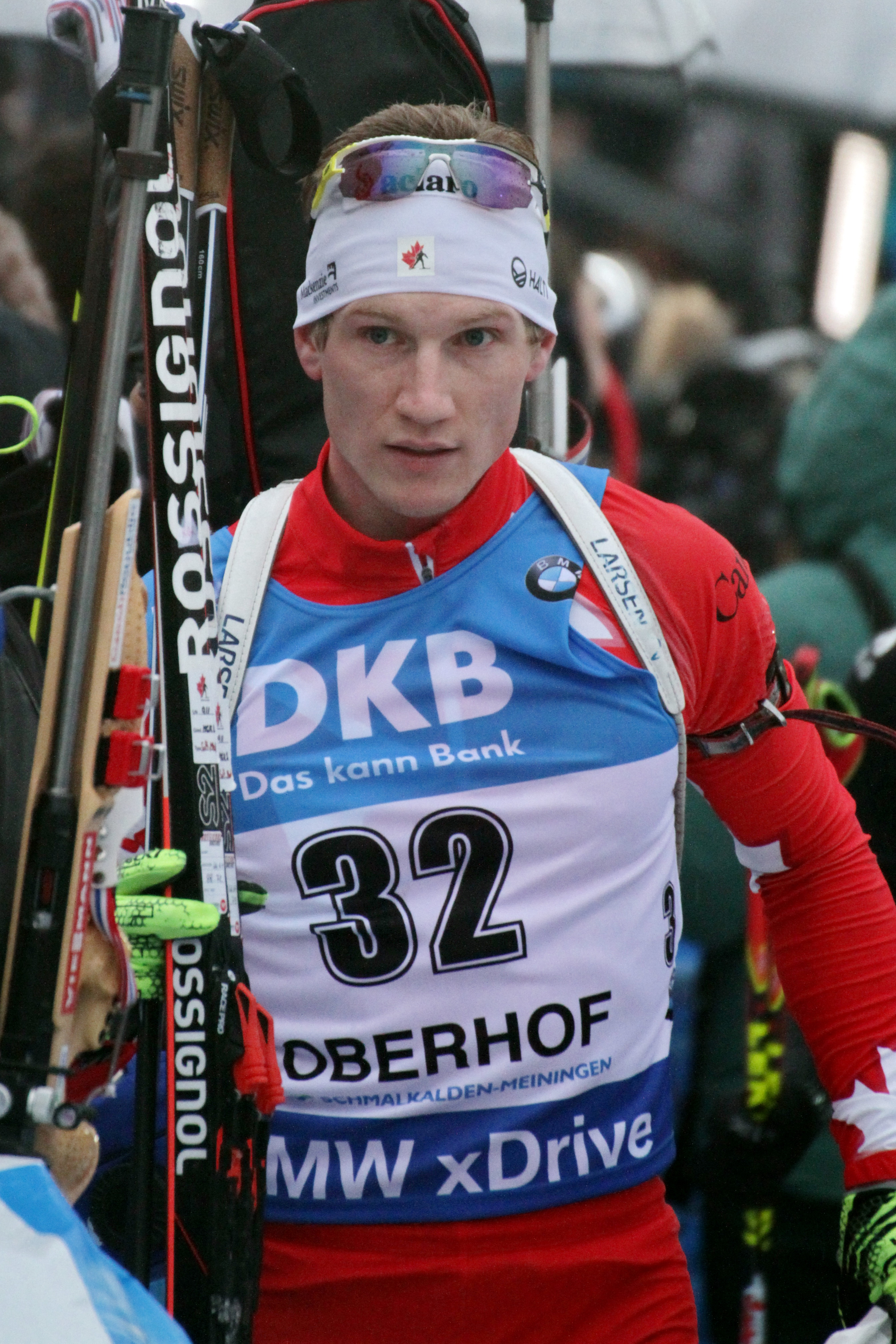
- Gow in 2018

Personal information
- Born: November 6, 1990 (age 36) Calgary, Alberta, Canada
- Height: 180 cm (5 ft 11 in)
- Weight: 80 kg (176 lb)

Sport
- Country: Canada
- Sport: Biathlon
Medal record
World Championships
Bronze medal – third place	2016 Oslo	4 × 7.5 km relay
Youth World Championships
Silver medal – second place	2009 Canmore	3 × 7.5 km relay

Scott Gow (born November 6, 1990) is a Canadian biathlete. He competed in the 2014/15 World Cup season and represented Canada at the Biathlon World Championships 2013 in Nové Město na Moravě and at the Biathlon World Championships 2015 in Kontiolahti.

Gow is the older brother of Canadian biathlete Christian Gow, competing alongside each other representing Canada at World Championships and both the 2018 and 2022 Winter Olympics.

== Career ==
In January 2018, Gow was named to Canada's 2018 Olympic team.

In January 2022, Gow was named to Canada's 2022 Olympic team. At the games, Gow was part of the relay team that finished in 6th, Canada's highest ever placement in the event.

== Biathlon results ==
All results are sourced from the International Biathlon Union.

=== Olympic Games ===
0 medals

Event	Individual	Sprint	Pursuit	Mass start	Relay	Mixed relay
(South Korea) 2018 Pyeongchang	14th	61st	—	—	11th	12th
(China) 2022 Beijing	5th	12th	20th	25th	6th	14th

=== World Championships ===
1 medal (1 bronze)

Event	Individual	Sprint	Pursuit	Mass start	Relay	Mixed relay	Single mixed relay
(Czech Republic) 2013 Nové Město	31st	44th	50th	—	8th	—	—N/a
(Finland) 2015 Kontiolahti	63rd	50th	52nd	—	19th	—	—N/a
(Norway) 2016 Oslo Holmenkollen	18th	47th	49th	—	Bronze	—	—N/a
(Austria) 2017 Hochfilzen	43rd	25th	47th	—	13th	13th	—N/a
(Sweden) 2019 Östersund	26th	50th	43rd	—	13th	16th	15th
(Italy) 2020 Antholz-Anterselva	80th	16th	35th	—	14th	14th	—
(Slovenia) 2021 Pokljuka	39th	76th	—	—	12th	8th	—

*During Olympic seasons competitions are only held for those events not included in the Olympic program.
