= Brendan Green =

Canadian biathlete

Brendan Greene
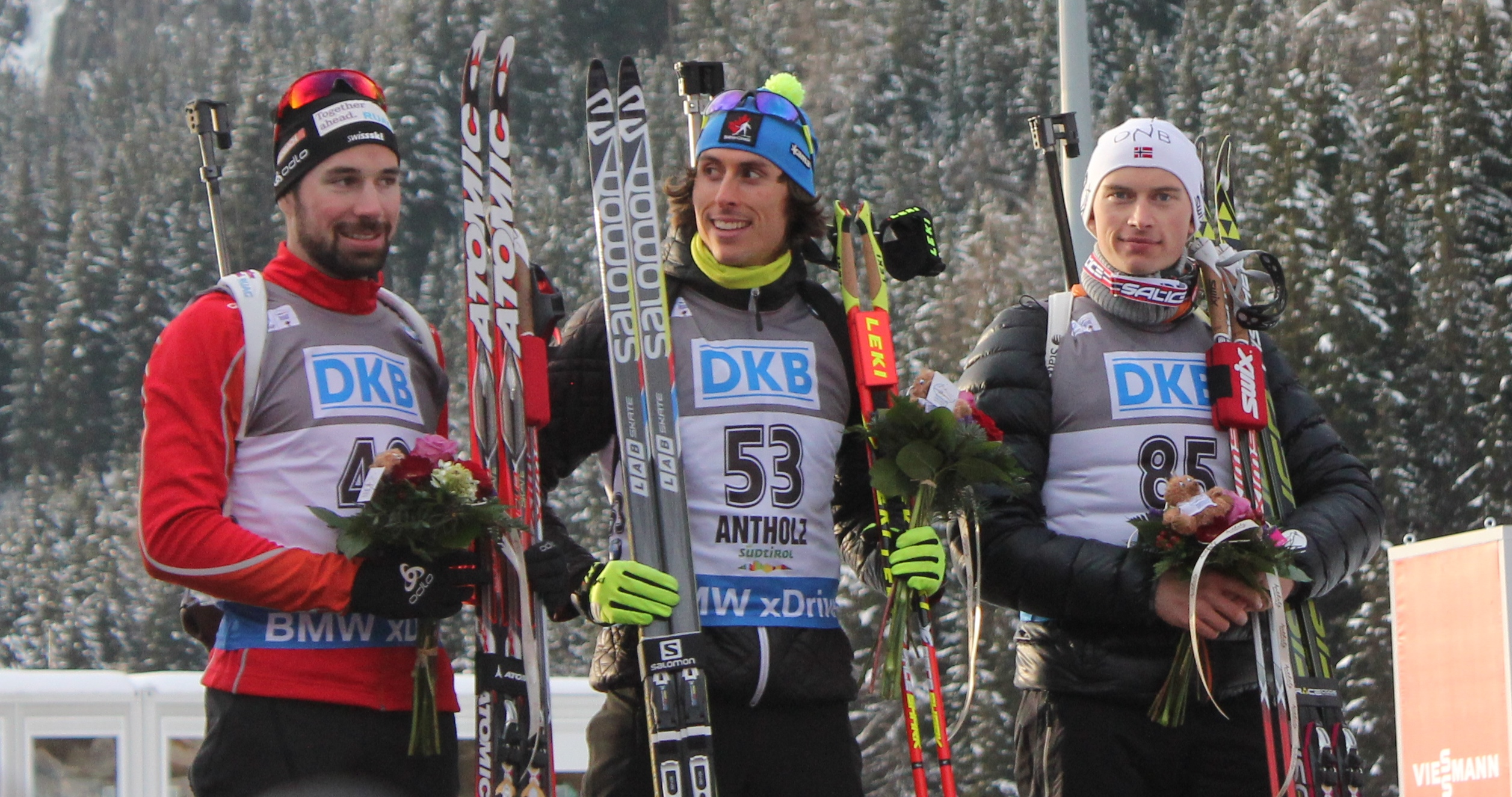
- Green (center) in 2015

Personal information
- Born: April 29, 1986 (age 40) Hay River, Canada
- Height: 6 ft 0 in (183 cm)
- Weight: 159 lb (72 kg)

Sport
- Country: Canada
- Sport: Biathlon
Medal record
World Championships
Bronze medal – third place	2016 Oslo	4 × 7.5 km relay
Junior World Championships
Bronze medal – third place	2007 Martell	4 × 7.5 km relay
Youth World Championships
Silver medal – second place	2005 Kontiolahti	3 × 7.5 km relay

Brendan Green (born November 4, 1986) is a Canadian biathlete and cross-country skier. He began skiing at three years of age and began competition under coach Pat Bobinski. He won Biathlon Canada's Myriam Bedard Award. Brendan competed for Canada in the Biathlon Men's 4x7.5 km Relay at the 2010 Winter Olympics. The group placed 10th.

== Career ==
=== 2018 Winter Olympics ===
In January 2018, Green was named to Canada's 2018 Olympic team.

== Biathlon results ==
All results are sourced from the International Biathlon Union.

=== Olympic Games ===
0 medals

Event	Individual	Sprint	Pursuit	Mass start	Relay	Mixed relay
(Canada) 2010 Vancouver	—	—	—	—	10th	—
(Russia) 2014 Sochi	21st	23rd	35th	9th	7th	10th
(South Korea) 2018 Pyeongchang	22nd	82nd	—	—	11th	12th

*The mixed relay was added as an event in 2014.

=== World Championships ===
1 medal (1 bronze)

Event	Individual	Sprint	Pursuit	Mass start	Relay	Mixed relay
(Russia) 2011 Khanty-Mansiysk	64th	91st	—	—	11th	—
(Finland) 2015 Kontiolahti	21st	21st	16th	21st	19th	12th
(Norway) 2016 Oslo	47th	35th	33rd	—	Bronze	11th
(Austria) 2017 Hochfilzen	86th	38th	52nd	—	13th	13th

*During Olympic seasons competitions are only held for those events not included in the Olympic program.
