= Torstein Stenersen =

Swedish biathlete

Personal information
- Nationality: Swedish
- Born: 16 October 1988 (age 36); Tromsø, Norway

Sport
- Country: Sweden
- Sport: Biathlon

Torstein Stenersen (born 16 October 1988) is a Swedish biathlete. He has competed in the Biathlon World Cup, and represented Sweden at the Biathlon World Championships 2016.

He was born in Tromsø, Norway, on 16 October 1988.
