= Christian Gow =

Canadian biathlete

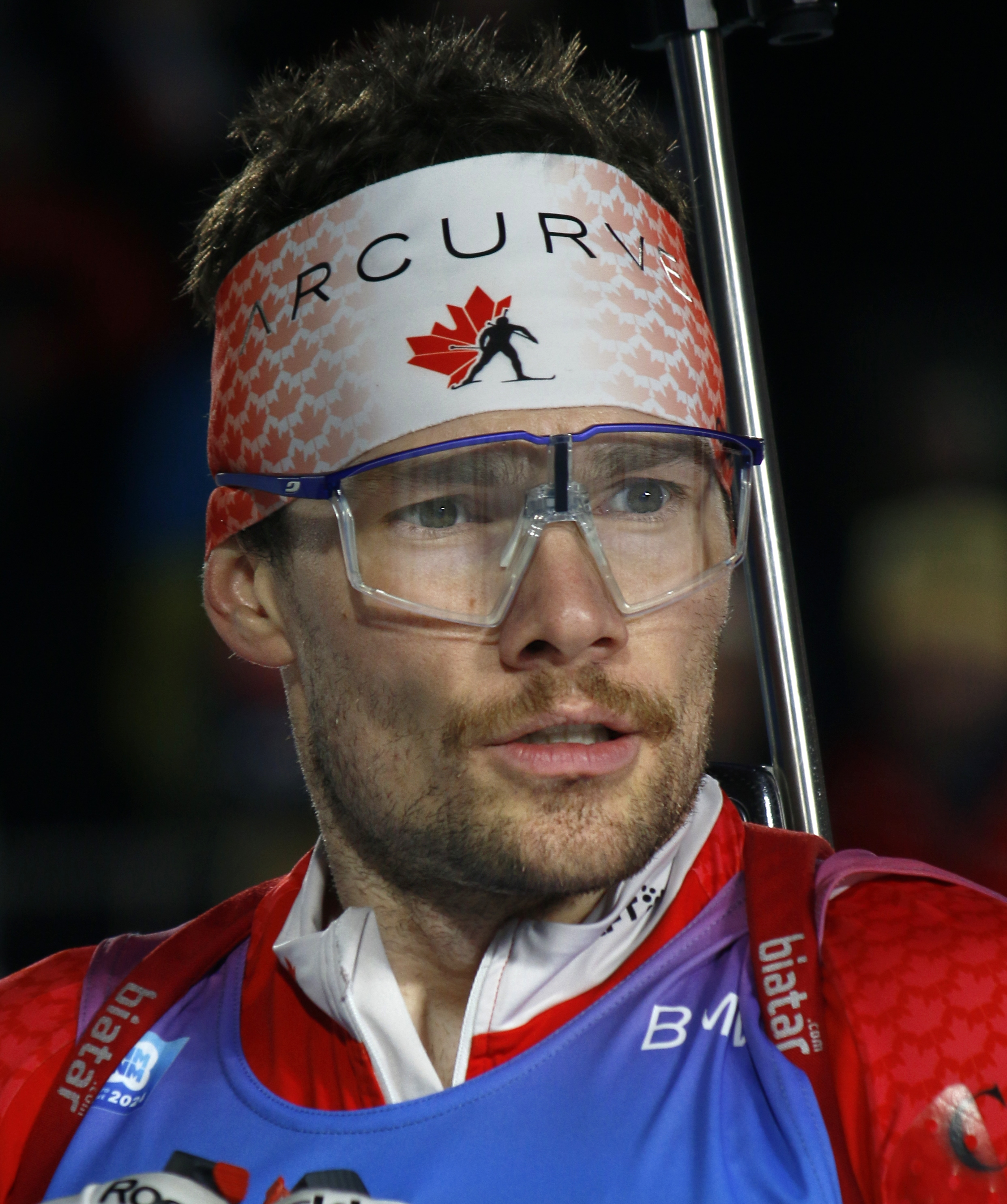
- Gow in 2024

Personal information
- Born: March 28, 1993 (age 33) Calgary, Alberta, Canada
- Height: 185 cm (6 ft 1 in)
- Weight: 176 lb (80 kg)

Sport
- Country: Canada
- Sport: Biathlon
Medal record
World Championships
Bronze medal – third place	2016 Oslo	4 × 7.5 km relay

Christian Gow (born March 28, 1993) is a former Canadian biathlete.

Gow is the younger brother of Canadian biathlete Scott Gow, competing alongside each other representing Canada at World Championships and both the 2018 and 2022 Winter Olympics.

== Career ==
In January 2018, Gow was named to Canada's 2018 Olympic team.

In January 2022, Gow was named to Canada's 2022 Olympic team. At the games, Gow was part of the relay team that finished in 6th, Canada's highest ever placement in the event.

He retired at the end of the 2023/24 season.

== Biathlon results ==
All results are sourced from the International Biathlon Union.

=== Olympic Games ===
0 medals

Event	Individual	Sprint	Pursuit	Mass start	Relay	Mixed relay
(South Korea) 2018 Pyeongchang	26th	62nd	—	—	11th	12th
(China) 2022 Beijing	24th	12th	35th	13th	6th	14th

=== World Championships ===
1 medal (1 bronze)

Event	Individual	Sprint	Pursuit	Mass start	Relay	Mixed relay	Single mixed relay
(Finland) 2015 Kontiolahti	65th	73rd	—	—	19th	—	—N/a
(Norway) 2016 Oslo Holmenkollen	46th	—	—	—	Bronze	—	—N/a
(Austria) 2017 Hochfilzen	DNF	32nd	23rd	—	13th	—	—N/a
(Sweden) 2019 Östersund	DNF	84th	—	—	13th	16th	—
(Italy) 2020 Antholz-Anterselva	20th	65th	—	—	14th	14th	8th
(Slovenia) 2021 Pokljuka	72nd	16th	29th	11th	12th	8th	8th
(Germany) 2023 Oberhof	89th	92nd	—	—	11th	8th	—
(Czech Republic) 2024 Nové Město na Moravě	44th	78th	—	—	19th	13th	—

*During Olympic seasons competitions are only held for those events not included in the Olympic program.
