= Julian Eberhard =

Austrian biathlete (born 1986)

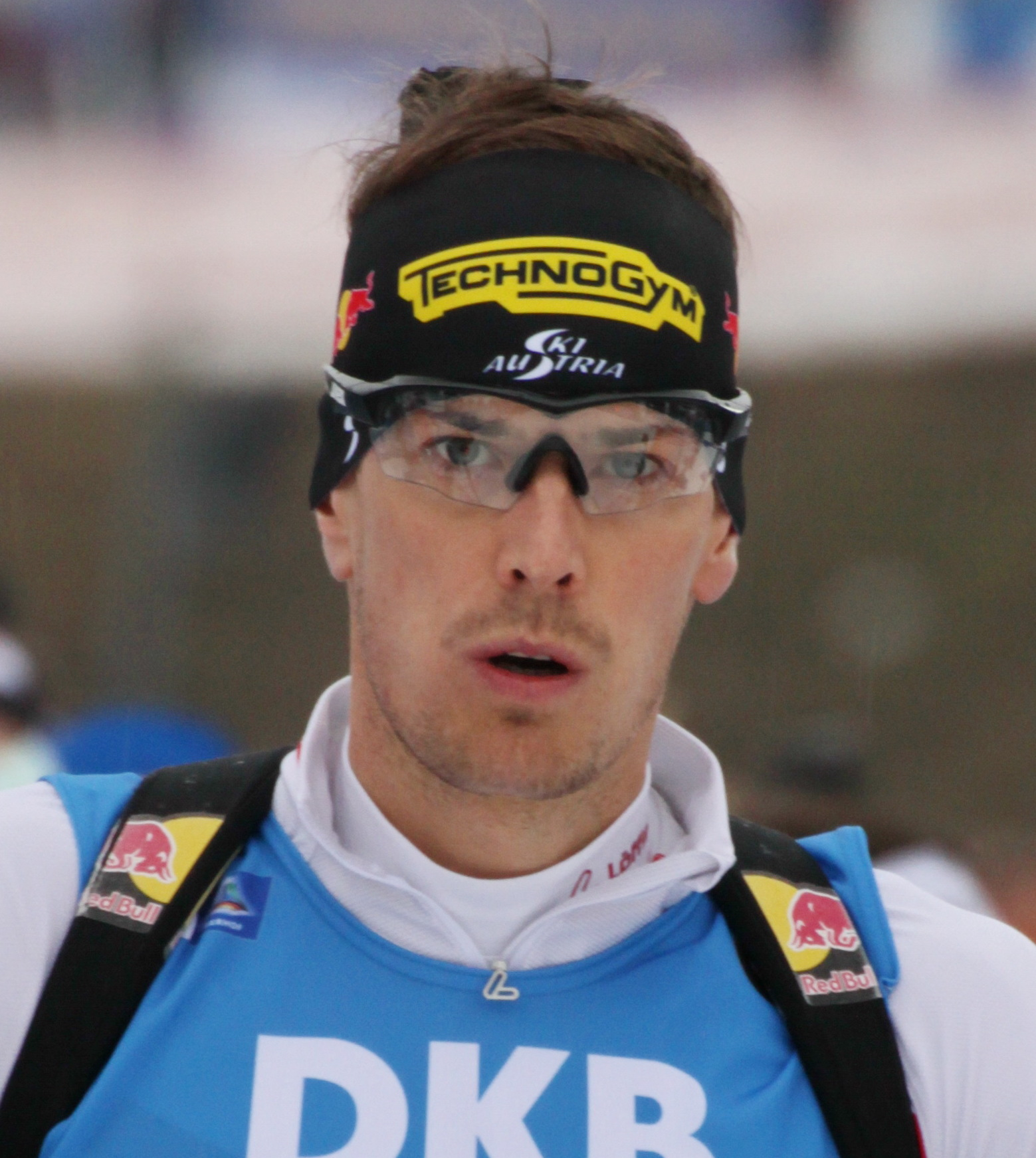
- Eberhard in 2018

Personal information
- Nationality: Austrian
- Born: 9 November 1986 (age 39) Saalfelden am Steinernen Meer, Austria
- Height: 1.96 m (6 ft 5 in)
- Weight: 84 kg (185 lb)

Sport

Professional information
- Sport: Biathlon
- Club: HSV Saalfelden
- World Cup debut: 2006

Olympic Games
- Teams: 1 (2018)
- Medals: 0

World Championships
- Teams: 5 (2013–2019)
- Medals: 2 (0 gold)
Medal record
Men's biathlon
Representing Austria
World Championships
Bronze medal – third place	2017 Hochfilzen	4 × 7.5 km relay
Bronze medal – third place	2019 Östersund	15 km mass start

Julian Eberhard (born 9 November 1986) is an Austrian former biathlete.

He debuted at the Biathlon World Cup in 2006. During the 2015–16 season Eberhard got his first individual victory, winning sprint in Khanty-Mansiysk. His brother Tobias Eberhard is also a biathlete.

== Biathlon results ==
All results are sourced from the International Biathlon Union.

=== Olympic Games ===
0 medals

Event	Individual	Sprint	Pursuit	Mass start	Relay	Mixed relay
(South Korea) 2018 Pyeongchang	17th	4th	15th	6th	4th	10th

=== World Championships ===
2 medals (2 bronze)

Event	Individual	Sprint	Pursuit	Mass start	Relay	Mixed relay	Single Mixed relay
(Czech Republic) 2013 Nové Město	—	66th	—	—	—	16th	—N/a
(Finland) 2015 Kontiolahti	—	44th	37th	—	—	—	—N/a
(Norway) 2016 Oslo Holmenkollen	58th	36th	26th	—	4th	—	—N/a
(Austria) 2017 Hochfilzen	14th	7th	8th	19th	Bronze	—	—N/a
(Sweden) 2019 Östersund	41st	16th	19th	Bronze	8th	—	—
(Italy) 2020 Rasen-Antholz	DNF	26th	14th	9th	6th	—	—
(Slovenia) 2021 Pokljuka	33rd	66th	—	—	10th	—	—

*During Olympic seasons competitions are only held for those events not included in the Olympic program.

== Individual victories ==
4 victories (3 Sp, 1 Ms)

Season	Date	Location	Discipline	Level
2015–16; 1 victory (1 Sp)	18 March 2016	(Russia) Khanty-Mansiysk	10 km Sprint	Biathlon World Cup
2016–17; 2 victories (2 Sp)	5 January 2017	(Germany) Oberhof	10 km Sprint	Biathlon World Cup
2016–17; 2 victories (2 Sp)	3 March 2017	(South Korea) Pyeongchang	10 km Sprint	Biathlon World Cup
2017–18; 1 victory (1 Ms)	11 March 2018	(Finland) Kontiolahti	15 km Mass Start	Biathlon World Cup

*Results are from UIPMB and IBU races which include the Biathlon World Cup, Biathlon World Championships and the Winter Olympic Games.
