= Arnd Peiffer =

German biathlete (born 1987)

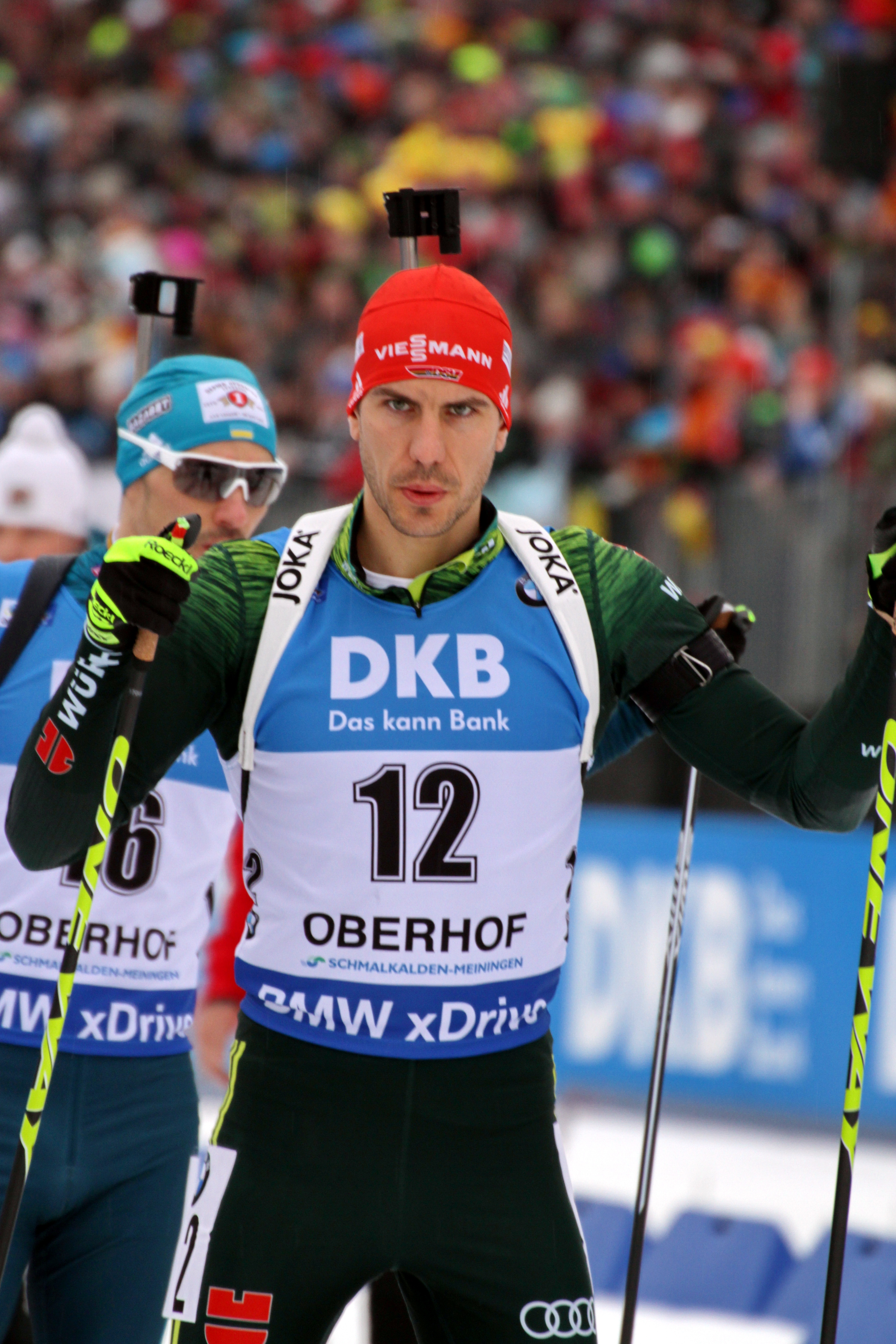

Personal information
- Born: 18 March 1987 (age 39) Wolfenbüttel, West Germany
- Height: 1.85 m (6 ft 1 in)
- Weight: 83 kg (183 lb)

Sport

Professional information
- Sport: Biathlon
- Club: WSV Clausthal-Zellerfeld
- Skis: Salomon
- Rifle: Anschütz
- World Cup debut: 8 January 2009
- Retired: 16 March 2021

Olympic Games
- Teams: 3 (2010–2018)
- Medals: 3 (2 gold)

World Championships
- Teams: 11 (2009–2021)
- Medals: 17 (5 gold)

World Cup
- Seasons: 13 (2008/09–2020/21)
- Individual victories: 11
- All victories: 20
- Individual podiums: 40
- All podiums: 86
- Overall titles: 0
- Discipline titles: 0
Medal record
Men's biathlon
Representing Germany
Event	1st	2nd	3rd
Olympic Games	2	0	1
World Championships	5	6	6
Total	7	6	7
Olympic Games
Gold medal – first place	2014 Sochi	4 × 7.5 km relay
Gold medal – first place	2018 Pyeongchang	10 km sprint
Bronze medal – third place	2018 Pyeongchang	4 × 7.5 km relay
World Championships
Gold medal – first place	2010 Khanty-Mansiysk	Mixed relay
Gold medal – first place	2011 Khanty-Mansiysk	10 km sprint
Gold medal – first place	2015 Kontiolahti	4 × 7.5 km relay
Gold medal – first place	2017 Hochfilzen	Mixed relay
Gold medal – first place	2019 Östersund	20 km individual
Silver medal – second place	2011 Khanty-Mansiysk	Mixed relay
Silver medal – second place	2016 Oslo	4 × 7.5 km relay
Silver medal – second place	2016 Oslo	Mixed relay
Silver medal – second place	2019 Östersund	4 × 7.5 km relay
Silver medal – second place	2019 Östersund	Mixed relay
Silver medal – second place	2021 Pokljuka	20 km individual
Bronze medal – third place	2009 Pyeongchang	4 × 7.5 km relay
Bronze medal – third place	2009 Pyeongchang	Mixed relay
Bronze medal – third place	2012 Ruhpolding	4 × 7.5 km relay
Bronze medal – third place	2012 Ruhpolding	Mixed relay
Bronze medal – third place	2013 Nové Město	4 × 7.5 km relay
Bronze medal – third place	2020 Antholz	4 × 7.5 km relay
Junior World Championships
Bronze medal – third place	2008 Ruhpolding	10 km sprint
Bronze medal – third place	2008 Ruhpolding	4 × 7.5 km relay

Arnd Peiffer (born 18 March 1987) is a German former biathlete. His greatest achievements were sprint victories in the 2018 Winter Olympics and the Biathlon World Championships 2011. During his career, he also won three World Championship relay golds as well as several other Olympic and World Championship medals.

Peiffer announced his retirement in March 2021.

== Biathlon results ==
All results are sourced from the International Biathlon Union.

=== Olympic Games ===
3 medals (2 gold, 1 bronze)

Event	Individual	Sprint	Pursuit	Mass start	Relay	Mixed relay
(Canada) 2010 Vancouver	—	37th	37th	17th	5th	—N/a
(Russia) 2014 Sochi	—	34th	19th	18th	Gold	—
(South Korea) 2018 Pyeongchang	21st	Gold	8th	13th	Bronze	4th

*The mixed relay was added as an event in 2014.

=== World Championships ===
17 medals (5 gold, 6 silver, 6 bronze)

Event	Individual	Sprint	Pursuit	Mass start	Relay	Mixed relay	Single mixed relay
(South Korea) 2009 Pyeongchang	—	—	—	—	Bronze	Bronze	—N/a
(Russia) 2010 Khanty-Mansiysk	—N/a	—N/a	—N/a	—N/a	—N/a	Gold	—N/a
(Russia) 2011 Khanty-Mansiysk	15th	Gold	4th	8th	7th	Silver	—N/a
(Germany) 2012 Ruhpolding	7th	37th	17th	7th	Bronze	Bronze	—N/a
(Czech Republic) 2013 Nové Město	28th	16th	21st	23rd	Bronze	—	—N/a
(Finland) 2015 Kontiolahti	22nd	30th	14th	22nd	Gold	—	—N/a
(Norway) 2016 Oslo Holmenkollen	—	7th	13th	5th	Silver	Silver	—N/a
(Austria) 2017 Hochfilzen	34th	12th	19th	10th	4th	Gold	—N/a
(Sweden) 2019 Östersund	Gold	9th	13th	6th	Silver	Silver	—
(Italy) 2020 Antholz	50th	7th	5th	21st	Bronze	4th	—
(Slovenia) 2021 Pokljuka	Silver	36th	20th	12th	7th	7th	—

*During Olympic seasons competitions are only held for those events not included in the Olympic program.
**The single mixed relay was added as an event in 2019.

=== World Cup ===
Season	Overall		Individual		Sprint		Pursuit		Mass start	
Season	Points	Position	Points	Position	Points	Position	Points	Position	Points	Position
2008–09	209	38th	24	54th	142	23rd	43	44th	0	—N/a
2009–10	646	9th	40	33rd	270	6th	160	9th	161	3rd
2010–11	735	4th	84	14th	333	3rd	175	8th	142	7th
2011–12	736	4th	69	12th	270	4th	257	3rd	140	8th
2012–13	491	18th	49	17th	177	16th	168	15th	97	20th
2013–14	547	7th	14	40th	286	2nd	189	12th	58	22nd
2014–15	538	13th	60	17th	241	9th	151	13th	86	22nd
2015–16	589	11th	0	—N/a	262	4th	181	10th	146	6th
2016–17	746	4th	48	22nd	275	4th	298	3rd	141	8th
2017–18	668	4th	42	14th	259	3rd	227	5th	165	7th
2018–19	802	5th	88	4th	232	10th	263	6th	219	2nd
2019–20	540	11th	0	—N/a	187	13th	167	9th	186	5th
2020–21	642	12th	84	5th	238	11th	137	20th	159	5th

=== Individual victories ===
11 victories (7 Sp, 2 Pu, 1 In, 1 MS)

Season	Date	Location	Discipline	Level
2008–09; 1 victory (1 Sp)	26 March 2009	(Russia) Khanty-Mansiysk	10 km sprint	Biathlon World Cup
2009–10; 1 victory (1 Sp)	23 January 2010	(Italy) Antholz-Anterselva	10 km sprint	Biathlon World Cup
2010–11; 2 victories (2 Sp)	4 February 2011	(United States) Presque Isle	10 km sprint	Biathlon World Cup
2010–11; 2 victories (2 Sp)	5 March 2011	(Russia) Khanty-Mansiysk	10 km sprint	Biathlon World Championships
2011–12; 2 victories (1 Sp, 1 Pu)	7 January 2012	(Germany) Oberhof	10 km sprint	Biathlon World Cup
2011–12; 2 victories (1 Sp, 1 Pu)	4 February 2012	(Norway) Oslo Holmenkollen	12.5 km pursuit	Biathlon World Cup
2014–15; 1 victory (1 Sp)	14 February 2015	(Norway) Oslo Holmenkollen	10 km sprint	Biathlon World Cup
2016–17; 1 victory (1 Pu)	11 March 2017	(Finland) Kontiolahti	12.5 km pursuit	Biathlon World Cup
2017–18; 1 victory (1 Sp)	11 February 2018	(South Korea) Pyeongchang	10 km sprint	Winter Olympic Games
2018–19; 1 victory (1 In)	13 March 2019	(Sweden) Östersund	20 km individual	Biathlon World Championships
2020–21; 1 victory (1 MS)	20 December 2020	(Austria) Hochfilzen	15 km Mass Start	Biathlon World Cup

*Results are from UIPMB and IBU races which include the Biathlon World Cup, Biathlon World Championships and the Winter Olympic Games.
