= Biathlon World Championships 2016 =

48th edition of the Biathlon World Championships

- Host city: Oslo
- Country: Norway
- Events: 11
- Opening: 3 March
- Closing: 13 March

The 48th Biathlon World Championships was held in Oslo, Norway from 3 to 13 March 2016.

There were 11 competitions in total: sprint, pursuit, individual, mass start, relay races for men and women, and mixed relay. All the events during this championships also counted towards the Biathlon World Cup.

== Host selection ==
Oslo was the sole candidate for this championship. Oslo was announced as the host city on 2 September 2012 during the X IBU Congress in Merano, Italy. Two years earlier Oslo lost Biathlon World Championships 2015 to Kontiolahti. This was the sixth time that these World Championships were held in Oslo; the city had previously hosted the event in 1986, 1990 (certain events held in Oslo due to difficult weather in the host city of Minsk), 1999 (certain events held in Oslo due to difficult weather in the host city of Kontiolahti), 2000 and 2002 (only the mass start as it was not on the program for the 2002 Olympics).

== Schedule ==
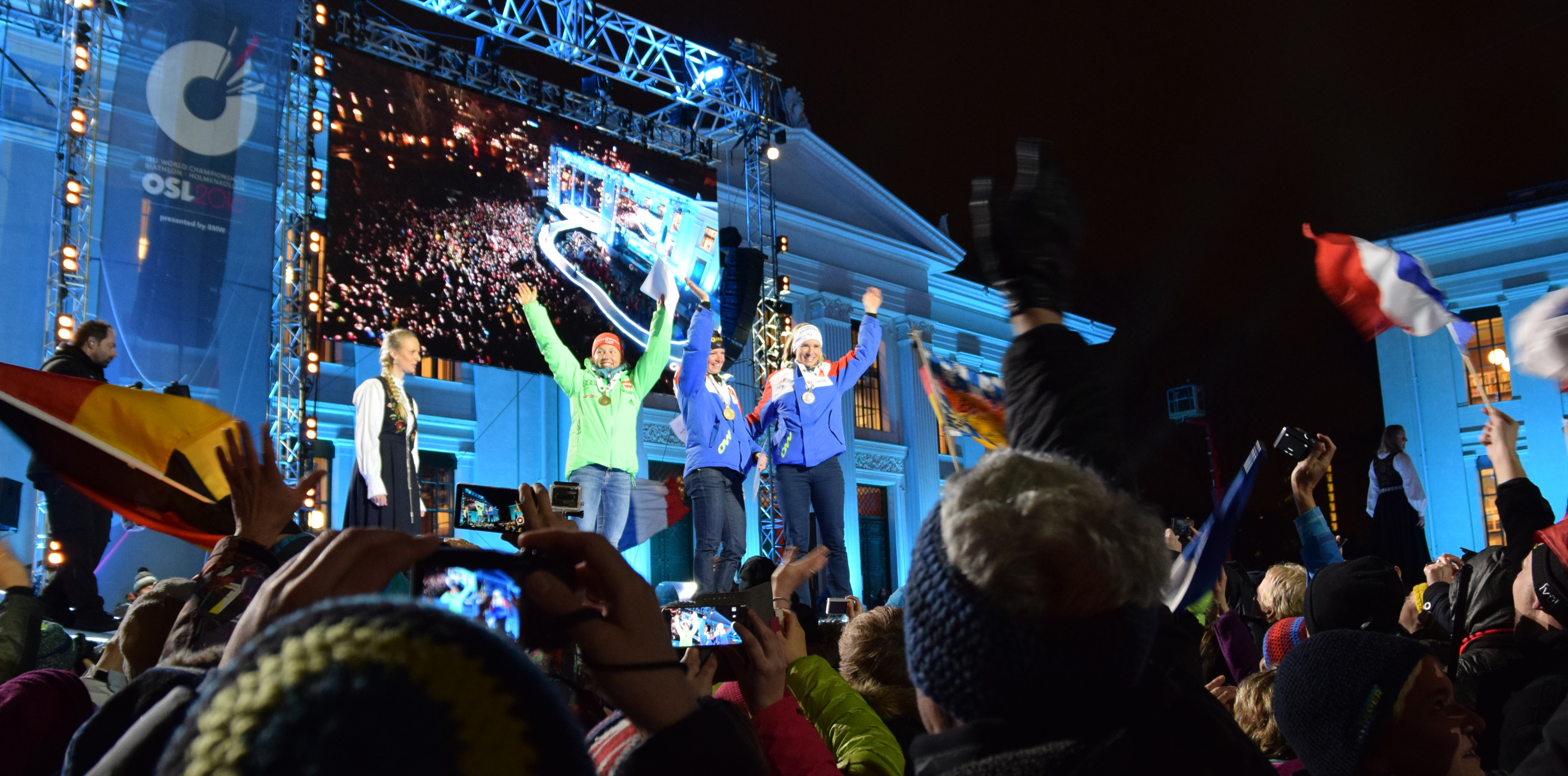
Medal ceremony after women's 15 km individual event at Medal Plaza of the University, Karl Johans gate, 9 March 2016. From left to right: Laura Dahlmeier, Marie Dorin Habert and Anaïs Bescond.

All times are local (UTC+1).

Date	Time	Event
3 March	15:30	2 × 6 km + 2 × 7.5 km mixed relay
5 March	11:30	Men's 10 km sprint
5 March	14:30	Women's 7.5 km sprint
6 March	13:30	Men's 12.5 km pursuit
6 March	15:45	Women's 10 km pursuit
9 March	13:00	Women's 15 km individual
10 March	15:30	Men's 20 km individual
11 March	15:30	Women's 4 × 6 km relay
12 March	15:30	Men's 4 × 7.5 km relay
13 March	13:00	Women's 12.5 km mass start
13 March	16:00	Men's 15 km mass start

== Medal summary ==
=== Medal table ===
Rank	Nation	Gold	Silver	Bronze	Total
1	France (FRA)	6	4	1	11
2	Norway (NOR)	4	2	3	9
3	Germany (GER)	1	3	3	7
4	Austria (AUT)	0	1	1	2
5	Italy (ITA)	0	1	0	1
6	Canada (CAN)	0	0	1	1
6	Finland (FIN)	0	0	1	1
6	Ukraine (UKR)	0	0	1	1
Totals (8 entries)		11	11	11	33

=== Top athletes ===
All athletes with two or more medals.

Rank	Nation	Gold	Silver	Bronze	Total
1	Martin Fourcade (FRA)	4	1	0	5
2	Marie Dorin Habert (FRA)	3	2	1	6
3	Johannes Thingnes Bø (NOR)	2	0	1	3
3	Tiril Eckhoff (NOR)	2	0	1	3
5	Ole Einar Bjørndalen (NOR)	1	2	1	4
6	Anaïs Bescond (FRA)	1	2	0	3
7	Laura Dahlmeier (GER)	1	1	3	5
8	Emil Hegle Svendsen (NOR)	1	0	1	2
8	Marte Olsbu (NOR)	1	0	1	2
8	Tarjei Bø (NOR)	1	0	1	2
11	Arnd Peiffer (GER)	0	2	0	2
11	Simon Schempp (GER)	0	2	0	2
13	Franziska Hildebrand (GER)	0	1	1	2
13	Franziska Preuß (GER)	0	1	1	2

== Medal winners ==
=== Men ===
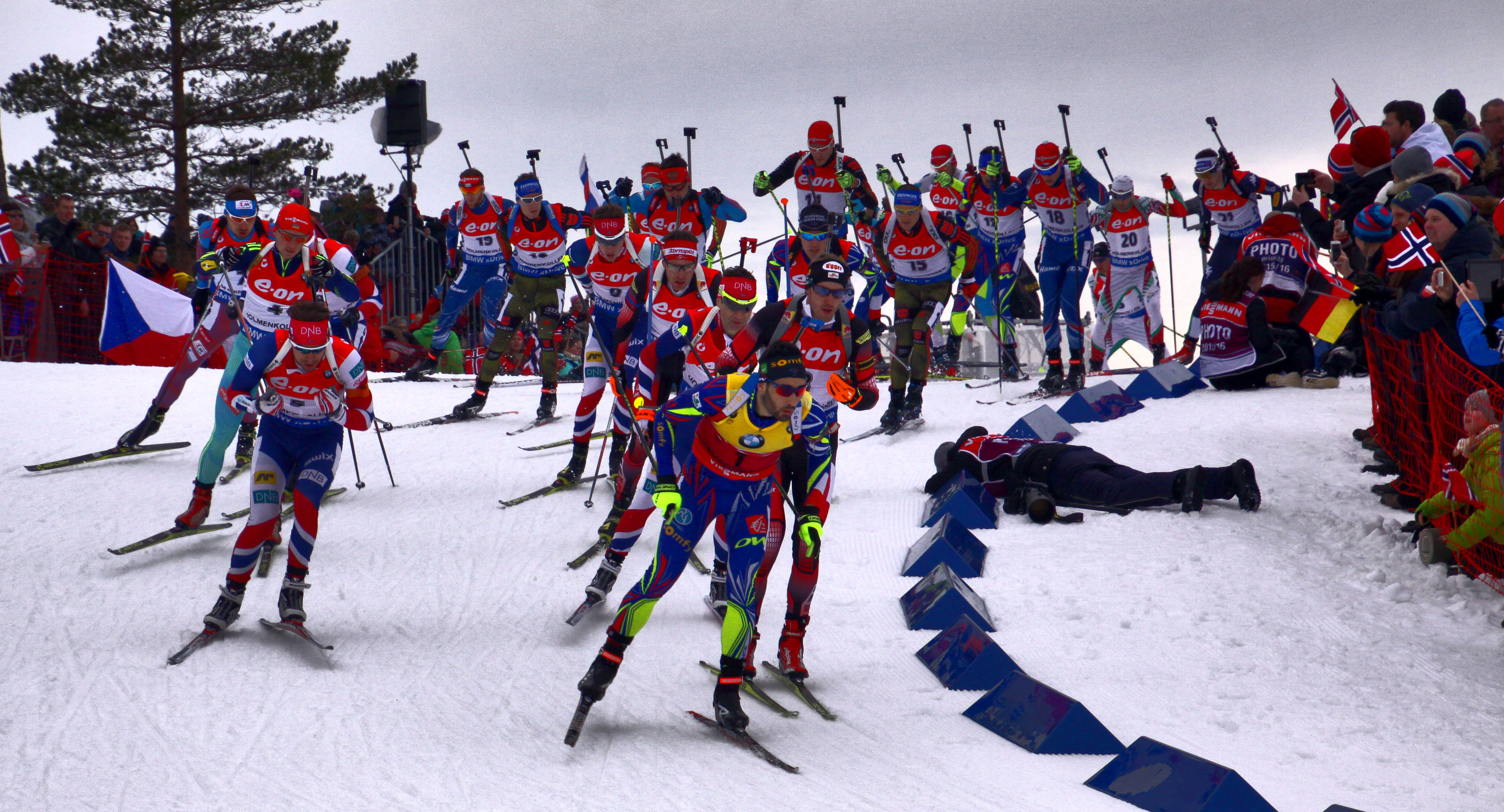
All the athletes together at the start of the mass start.

Event	Gold		Silver		Bronze	
10 km sprint	Martin Fourcade; France	25:35.4 (0+0)	Ole Einar Bjørndalen; Norway	26:02.3 (0+0)	Serhiy Semenov; Ukraine	26:03.0 (0+0)
12.5 km pursuit	Martin Fourcade; France	32:56.5 (0+0+1+2)	Ole Einar Bjørndalen; Norway	33:16.5 (1+0+0+1)	Emil Hegle Svendsen; Norway	33:27.7 (0+0+0+1)
20 km individual	Martin Fourcade; France	49:13.9 (0+1+0+0)	Dominik Landertinger; Austria	49:19.0 (0+0+0+0)	Simon Eder; Austria	49:28.3 (0+0+0+0)
4 × 7.5 km relay	Norway Ole Einar Bjørndalen; Tarjei Bø; Johannes Thingnes Bø; Emil Hegle Svendsen	1:13:16.8 (0+0) (0+2) (0+1) (0+1) (0+0) (0+0) (0+0) (0+2)	Germany Erik Lesser; Benedikt Doll; Arnd Peiffer; Simon Schempp	1:13:28.3 (0+0) (0+0) (0+1) (0+1) (0+1) (0+1) (0+0) (0+1)	Canada Christian Gow; Nathan Smith; Scott Gow; Brendan Green	1:13:40.2 (0+0) (0+0) (0+1) (0+1) (0+0) (0+3) (0+0) (0+0)
15 km mass start	Johannes Thingnes Bø; Norway	37:05.1 (0+0+1+0)	Martin Fourcade; France	37:07.9 (1+0+0+0)	Ole Einar Bjørndalen; Norway	37:11.8 (0+0+0+0)

=== Women ===
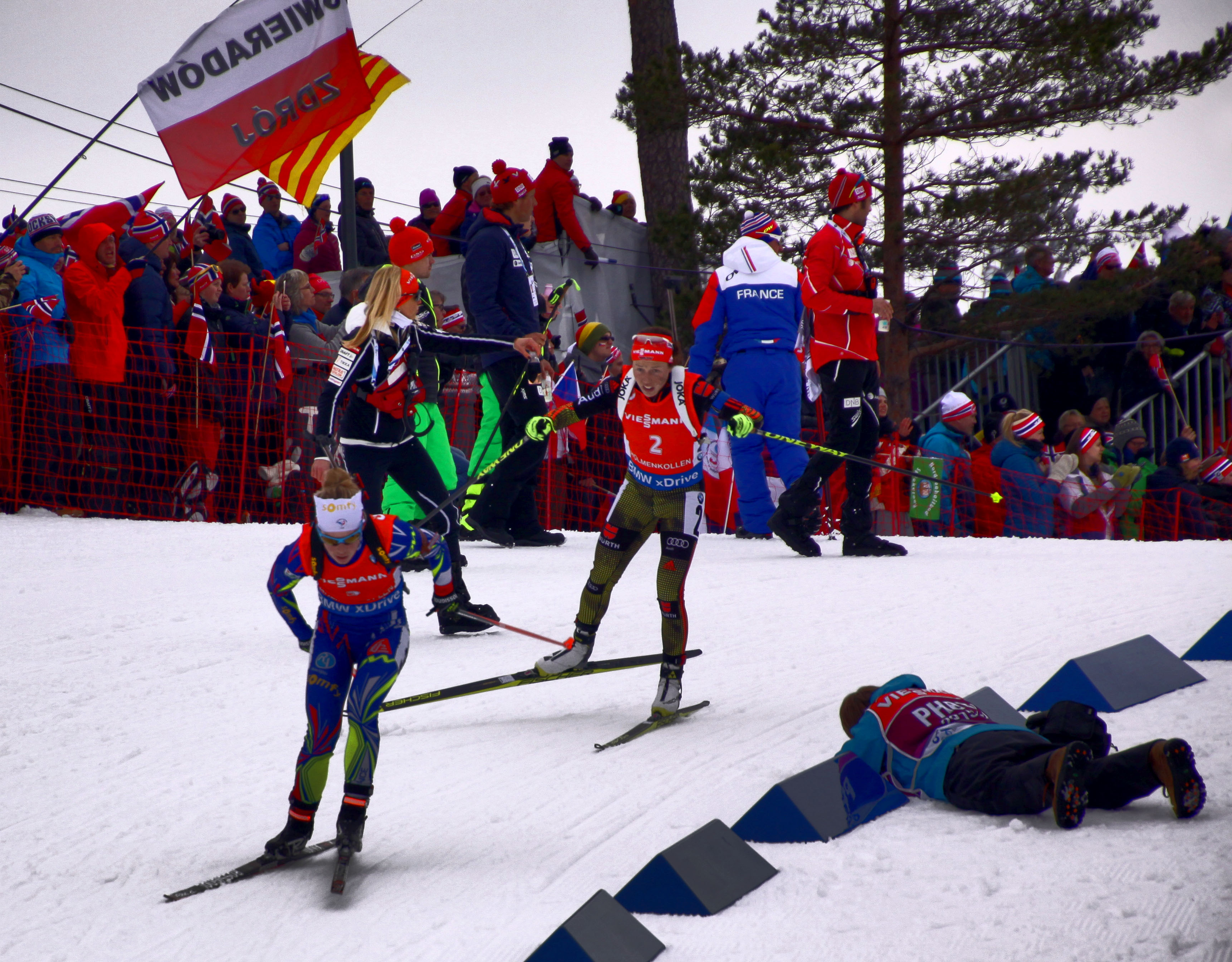
Marie Dorin-Habert and Laura Dahlmeier during the mass start.

Event	Gold		Silver		Bronze	
7.5 km sprint	Tiril Eckhoff; Norway	21:10.8 (0+0)	Marie Dorin Habert; France	21:25.8 (0+0)	Laura Dahlmeier; Germany	21:30.6 (1+0)
10 km pursuit	Laura Dahlmeier; Germany	30:49.2 (0+0+0+0)	Dorothea Wierer; Italy	31:37.5 (0+1+1+0)	Marie Dorin Habert; France	31:46.5 (0+0+2+1)
15 km individual	Marie Dorin Habert; France	44:02.8 (0+0+0+1)	Anaïs Bescond; France	44:15.0 (0+0+0+1)	Laura Dahlmeier; Germany	45:20.6 (1+0+1+0)
4 × 6 km relay	Norway Synnøve Solemdal; Fanny Horn Birkeland; Tiril Eckhoff; Marte Olsbu	1:07:10.1 (0+0) (0+0) (0+1) (0+1) (0+0) (0+0) (0+2) (0+2)	France Justine Braisaz; Anaïs Bescond; Anaïs Chevalier; Marie Dorin Habert	1:07:15.3 (0+3) (0+2) (0+0) (0+0) (0+0) (0+1) (0+2) (0+0)	Germany Franziska Preuß; Franziska Hildebrand; Maren Hammerschmidt; Laura Dahlmeier	1:07:38.7 (0+0) (0+2) (0+0) (0+0) (0+0) (0+2) (0+0) (0+0)
12.5 km mass start	Marie Dorin Habert; France	35:28.5 (0+0+0+0)	Laura Dahlmeier; Germany	35:35.8 (0+0+1+0)	Kaisa Mäkäräinen; Finland	35:36.6 (0+0+1+0)

=== Mixed ===
Event	Gold		Silver		Bronze	
2 × 6 + 2 × 7.5 km W+M relay	France Anaïs Bescond; Marie Dorin Habert; Quentin Fillon Maillet; Martin Fourcade	1:14:01.0 (0+0) (0+3) (0+0) (0+1) (0+2) (0+1) (0+0) (0+1)	Germany Franziska Preuß; Franziska Hildebrand; Arnd Peiffer; Simon Schempp	1:14:05.3 (0+2) (0+0) (0+2) (0+0) (0+0) (0+1) (0+1) (0+1)	Norway Marte Olsbu; Tiril Eckhoff; Johannes Thingnes Bø; Tarjei Bø	1:14:15.4 (0+1) (0+0) (0+2) (0+2) (0+1) (0+1) (0+3) (0+0)
