= Biathlon World Championships 2016 – Women's relay =

Women's relay at the Biathlon World Championships 2016
- Venue: Oslo, Norway
- Date: 11 March
- Competitors: 92 from 23 nations
- Teams: 23
- Winning time: 1:07:10.0

Medalists
gold medal	Synnøve Solemdal; Fanny Horn Birkeland; Tiril Eckhoff; Marte Olsbu	Norway
silver medal	Justine Braisaz; Anaïs Bescond; Anaïs Chevalier; Marie Dorin Habert	France
bronze medal	Franziska Preuß; Franziska Hildebrand; Maren Hammerschmidt; Laura Dahlmeier	Germany

The Women's relay event of the Biathlon World Championships 2016 was held on 11 March 2016.

== Results ==
The race was started at 15:30 CET.

Rank	Bib	Team	Time	Penalties (P+S)	Deficit
1st place, gold medalist(s)	12	Norway; Synnøve Solemdal; Fanny Horn Birkeland; Tiril Eckhoff; Marte Olsbu	1:07:10.0; 16:39.0; 17:02.9; 16:19.4; 17:08.7	0+3 0+3; 0+0 0+0; 0+1 0+1; 0+0 0+0; 0+2 0+2	
2nd place, silver medalist(s)	5	France; Justine Braisaz; Anais Bescond; Anais Chevalier; Marie Dorin Habert	1:07:15.3; 17:26.9; 16:10.9; 16:52.1; 16:45.4	0+5 0+3; 0+3 0+2; 0+0 0+0; 0+0 0+1; 0+2 0+0	+5.3
3rd place, bronze medalist(s)	4	Germany; Franziska Preuß; Franziska Hildebrand; Maren Hammerschmidt; Laura Dahlmeier	1:07:38.6; 16:49.2; 16:42.8; 16:52.6; 17:14.0	0+0 0+4; 0+0 0+2; 0+0 0+0; 0+0 0+2; 0+0 0+0	+28.6
4	7	Poland; Magdalena Gwizdoń; Monika Hojnisz; Weronika Nowakowska; Krystyna Guzik	1:08:18.4	0+2 0+5	+1:08.4
5	1	Ukraine; Valentyna Semerenko; Iryna Varvynets; Olena Pidhrushna; Yuliia Dzhima	1:08:37.7	1+4 0+1	+1:27.7
6	3	Czech Republic; Jessica Jislová; Gabriela Soukalová; Lucie Charvátová; Veronika Vítková	1:08:59.3	0+0 3+6	+1:49.3
7	2	Italy; Lisa Vittozzi; Karin Oberhofer; Alexia Runggaldier; Dorothea Wierer	1:08:59.3	0+1 1+7	+1:49.3
8	10	Kazakhstan; Galina Vishnevskaya; Darya Usanova; Anna Kistanova; Alina Raikova	1:09:18.4	0+3 0+4	+2:08.4
9	19	Slovenia; Andreja Mali; Teja Gregorin; Anja Eržen; Urška Poje	1:10:04.9	0+3 0+2	+2:54.9
10	8	Sweden; Anna Magnusson; Mona Brorsson; Ingela Andersson; Linn Persson	1:10:14.6	1+5 0+1	+3:04.6
11	6	Russia; Tatiana Akimova; Anastasia Zagoruiko; Daria Virolaynen; Ekaterina Yurlova	1:10:17.9; 17:03.9; 17:03.6; 18:51.5; 17:18.9	0+0 2+3; 0+0 0+0; 0+0 0+0; 0+0 2+3; 0+0 0+0	+3:07.9
12	15	Austria; Lisa Hauser; Dunja Zdouc; Julia Schwaiger; Susanne Hoffmann	1:10:41.4	0+2 0+4	+3:31.4
13	14	United States; Susan Dunklee; Hannah Dreissigacker; Clare Egan; Annelies Cook	1:10:57.1	0+2 0+6	+3:47.1
14	18	Slovakia; Paulína Fialková; Jana Gereková; Terézia Poliaková; Ivona Fialková	1:11:18.0	0+5 0+7	+4:08.0
15	11	Canada; Julia Ransom; Rosanna Crawford; Sarah Beaudry; Zina Kocher	1:11:58.6	1+6 2+5	+4:48.6
16	13	Switzerland; Selina Gasparin; Lena Häcki; Aita Gasparin; Irene Cadurisch	1:12:21.8	1+9 0+5	+5:11.8
17	21	Finland; Kaisa Mäkäräinen; Auli Kiskola; Laura Toivanen; Sanna Markkanen	1:12:31.5	0+0 0+7	+5:21.5
18	9	Belarus; Nadezhda Skardino; Darya Yurkevich; Nastassia Dubarezava; Iryna Kryuko	1:12:46.9	0+2 3+8	+5:36.9
19	22	Japan; Fuyuko Tachizaki; Yurie Tanaka; Rina Suzuki; Sari Furuya	1:13:13.5	0+6 1+7	+6:03.5
20	17	Bulgaria; Emilia Yordanova; Desislava Stoyanova; Stefani Popova; Dafinka Koeva	1:13:17.3	1+5 0+5	+6:07.3
21	16	Romania; Éva Tófalvi; Luminița Pișcoran; Réka Forika; Florina Ioana Cîrstea	LAP		
22	20	China; Zhang Yan; Tang Jialin; Wang Xuelan; Chu Yuanmeng	LAP		
23	23	South Korea; Mun Ji-hee; Ko Eun-jung; Hwang Hye-suk; Kim Seon-su	LAP		
