= 2016–17 Biathlon World Cup – Overall Women =

== 2015–16 Top 3 standings ==
Medal	Athlete	Points
Gold:	(Czech Republic) Gabriela Soukalová	1074
Silver:	(France) Marie Dorin Habert	1028
Bronze:	(Italy) Dorothea Wierer	944

== Events summary ==
Event	Winner	Second	Third
Östersund 15 km Individual details	Laura Dahlmeier; Germany	Anaïs Bescond; France	Darya Yurkevich; Belarus
Östersund 7.5 km Sprint details	Marie Dorin Habert; France	Kaisa Mäkäräinen; Finland	Gabriela Koukalová; Czech Republic
Östersund 10 km Pursuit details	Gabriela Koukalová; Czech Republic	Laura Dahlmeier; Germany	Dorothea Wierer; Italy
Pokljuka 7.5 km Sprint details	Laura Dahlmeier; Germany	Justine Braisaz; France	Marte Olsbu; Norway
Pokljuka 10 km Pursuit details	Laura Dahlmeier; Germany	Kaisa Mäkäräinen; Finland	Eva Puskarčíková; Czech Republic
Nové Město 7.5 km Sprint details	Tatiana Akimova; Russia	Anaïs Chevalier; France	Susan Dunklee; United States
Nové Město 10 km Pursuit details	Anaïs Chevalier; France	Dorothea Wierer; Italy	Tatiana Akimova; Russia
Nové Město 12.5 km Mass start details	Gabriela Koukalová; Czech Republic	Laura Dahlmeier; Germany	Dorothea Wierer; Italy
Oberhof 7.5 km Sprint details	Gabriela Koukalová; Czech Republic	Kaisa Mäkäräinen; Finland	Marie Dorin Habert; France
Oberhof 10 km Pursuit details	Marie Dorin Habert; France	Gabriela Koukalová; Czech Republic	Kaisa Mäkäräinen; Finland
Oberhof 12.5 km Mass start details	Gabriela Koukalová; Czech Republic	Laura Dahlmeier; Germany	Eva Puskarčíková; Czech Republic
Ruhpolding 7.5 km Sprint details	Kaisa Mäkäräinen; Finland	Gabriela Koukalová; Czech Republic	Laura Dahlmeier; Germany
Ruhpolding 10 km Pursuit details	Kaisa Mäkäräinen; Finland	Gabriela Koukalová; Czech Republic	Marie Dorin Habert; France
Antholz-Anterselva 15 km Individual details	Laura Dahlmeier; Germany	Anaïs Chevalier; France	Alexia Runggaldier; Italy
Antholz-Anterselva 12.5 km Mass start details	Nadine Horchler; Germany	Laura Dahlmeier; Germany	Gabriela Koukalová; Czech Republic
World Championships 7.5 km Sprint details	Gabriela Koukalová; Czech Republic	Laura Dahlmeier; Germany	Anaïs Chevalier; France
World Championships 10 km Pursuit details	Laura Dahlmeier; Germany	Darya Domracheva; Belarus	Gabriela Koukalová; Czech Republic
World Championships 15 km Individual details	Laura Dahlmeier; Germany	Gabriela Koukalová; Czech Republic	Alexia Runggaldier; Italy
World Championships 12.5 km Mass start details	Laura Dahlmeier; Germany	Susan Dunklee; United States	Kaisa Mäkäräinen; Finland
Pyeongchang 7.5 km Sprint details	Laura Dahlmeier; Germany	Tiril Eckhoff; Norway	Anaïs Chevalier; France
Pyeongchang 10 km Pursuit details	Laura Dahlmeier; Germany	Kaisa Mäkäräinen; Finland	Anaïs Bescond; France
Kontiolahti 7.5 km Sprint details	Tiril Eckhoff; Norway	Laura Dahlmeier; Germany	Darya Domracheva; Belarus
Kontiolahti 10 km Pursuit details	Laura Dahlmeier; Germany	Marie Dorin Habert; France	Lisa Vittozzi; Italy
Oslo Holmenkollen 7.5 km Sprint details	Mari Laukkanen; Finland	Justine Braisaz; France	Anaïs Bescond; France
Oslo Holmenkollen 10 km Pursuit details	Mari Laukkanen; Finland	Gabriela Koukalová; Czech Republic	Justine Braisaz; France
Oslo Holmenkollen 12.5 km Mass start details	Tiril Eckhoff; Norway	Gabriela Koukalová; Czech Republic	Kaisa Mäkäräinen; Finland

== Standings ==
For each event, a first place gives 60 points, a 2nd place 54 pts, a 3rd place 48 pts, a 4th place 43 pts, a fifth place 40 pts, a 6th place 38 pts, 7th 36 pts 8th 34 points, 9th 32 points, 10th 31 points, then linearly decreasing by one point down to the 40th place. Equal placings (ties) give an equal number of points. The sum of all WC points of the season, minus the points from 2 events in which the biathlete got the worst scores, gives the biathlete's total WC score.

#	Name	ÖST IN	ÖST SP	ÖST PU	POK SP	POK PU	NOV SP	NOV PU	NOV MS	OBE SP	OBE PU	OBE MS	RUH SP	RUH PU	ANT IN	ANT MS	HOC SP	HOC PU	HOC IN	HOC MS	PYE SP	PYE PU	KON SP	KON PU	OSL SP	OSL PU	OSL MS	Total
1.	Laura Dahlmeier (GER)	60	43	54	60	60	43	36	54	—	—	54	48	43	60	54	54	60	60	60	60	60	54	60	10	32	32	1211
2	Gabriela Koukalová (CZE)	24	48	60	36	~~15~~	28	34	60	60	54	60	54	54	~~17~~	48	60	48	54	43	20	34	28	31	43	54	54	1089
3	Kaisa Mäkäräinen (FIN)	17	54	40	43	54	40	30	34	54	48	34	60	60	26	43	29	36	26	48	43	54	~~0~~	~~10~~	14	36	48	971
4	Marie Dorin Habert (FRA)	22	60	36	24	43	30	40	36	48	60	27	43	48	43	40	36	38	1	36	DNF	—	32	54	24	27	8	856
5	Dorothea Wierer (ITA)	~~10~~	22	48	20	22	36	54	48	38	34	24	40	36	10	24	20	31	25	34	28	23	20	~~4~~	22	34	26	719
6	Justine Braisaz (FRA)	40	31	28	54	36	38	19	29	2	~~DNS~~	22	29	29	23	26	13	40	~~0~~	6	31	20	29	30	54	48	29	706
7	Anaïs Chevalier (FRA)	8	10	7	0	2	54	60	27	43	32	16	23	34	54	23	48	30	3	28	48	29	34	32	~~0~~	—	24	669
8	Yuliia Dzhima (UKR)	21	20	32	13	30	~~7~~	28	22	26	26	40	30	~~0~~	21	31	19	18	32	38	38	36	7	15	28	30	31	632
9	Franziska Hildebrand (GER)	16	25	22	40	34	26	31	20	24	29	38	38	23	32	20	22	13	10	~~8~~	36	38	24	8	~~6~~	12	40	621
10	Susan Dunklee (USA)	0	14	19	30	40	48	43	—	0	0	32	8	17	0	14	12	19	38	54	40	40	40	27	36	4	21	596
11	Tiril Eckhoff (NOR)	—	36	14	21	9	27	32	30	—	—	—	22	10	—	—	28	11	2	29	54	43	60	26	29	23	60	566
12	Marte Olsbu (NOR)	25	0	—	48	32	18	23	40	17	36	31	24	32	12	6	0	25	0	4	17	32	10	18	38	38	25	551
13	Eva Puskarčíková (CZE)	26	26	34	34	48	20	15	24	0	5	48	27	38	28	30	24	10	18	10	25	2	0	—	0	—	12	504
14	Anaïs Bescond (FRA)	54	19	15	0	1	34	14	21	23	40	10	32	0	DSQ	12	—	—	0	—	34	48	13	28	48	19	36	501
15	Lisa Theresa Hauser (AUT)	36	40	38	29	38	21	13	32	0	—	DNF	3	9	31	29	18	15	0	12	0	0	12	38	19	40	20	493
16	Tatiana Akimova (RUS)	29	11	9	12	21	60	48	31	27	9	28	26	28	29	25	25	23	0	16	7	0	—	—	1	10	4	479
17	Selina Gasparin (SUI)	~~0~~	13	20	25	31	17	18	28	9	22	36	~~0~~	12	0	22	30	12	0	23	30	27	30	14	0	DNS	30	449
18	Nadezhda Skardino (BLR)	0	34	31	27	25	2	0	23	—	—	23	16	14	25	16	16	22	24	25	19	30	15	23	0	2	28	440
19	Vanessa Hinz (GER)	31	38	30	0	8	0	—	43	7	38	20	6	15	38	34	38	21	34	21	—	—	DNS	—	0	0	14	436
20	Galina Vishnevskaya (KAZ)	2	32	24	16	28	0	21	18	3	31	43	34	30	0	28	0	—	20	—	0	10	19	19	13	28	10	429
21	Celia Aymonier (FRA)	0	24	21	32	24	29	24	6	32	20	14	~~0~~	4	0	2	32	32	16	24	5	14	36	34	0	—	2	427
22	Maren Hammerschmidt (GER)	0	21	16	0	17	—	—	—	40	43	21	2	24	40	21	0	1	36	—	13	12	25	25	21	26	22	426
23	Anna Magnusson (SWE)	20	27	25	0	13	8	16	14	—	—	30	25	3	11	36	27	5	0	—	26	25	31	2	18	20	16	398
24	Darya Domracheva (BLR)	—	—	—	—	—	—	—	—	4	7	—	28	DNS	14	—	14	54	28	22	21	28	48	43	20	29	34	394
25	Veronika Vítková (CZE)	32	6	23	11	26	25	29	25	—	—	—	20	25	0	27	0	—	0	—	0	DNF	9	17	40	31	43	389
26	Mari Laukkanen (FIN)	0	0	10	0	6	16	26	16	1	6	—	—	—	30	10	0	DNS	43	—	—	—	22	16	60	60	38	360
27	Lisa Vittozzi (ITA)	0	8	0	6	19	3	27	—	0	DNS	—	14	31	0	—	43	27	5	30	18	0	38	48	0	25	—	342
28	Alexia Runggaldier (ITA)	0	5	6	1	0	14	10	—	0	0	—	17	22	48	38	0	26	48	32	0	1	0	0	31	16	18	333
29	Federica Sanfilippo (ITA)	0	~~0~~	0	18	0	23	17	12	25	30	8	21	6	0	4	40	24	0	20	DNS	—	6	0	32	22	6	314
30	Teja Gregorin (SLO)	0	9	2	5	11	1	8	—	8	18	—	19	20	5	—	11	6	29	40	0	—	0	21	34	43	23	313
#	Name	ÖST IN	ÖST SP	ÖST PU	POK SP	POK PU	NOV SP	NOV PU	NOV MS	OBE SP	OBE PU	OBE MS	RUH SP	RUH PU	ANT IN	ANT MS	HOC SP	HOC PU	HOC IN	HOC MS	PYE SP	PYE PU	KON SP	KON PU	OSL SP	OSL PU	OSL MS	Total
31	Paulína Fialková (SVK)	—	15	17	0	—	0	0	—	—	—	—	0	—	0	—	10	29	14	31	27	31	4	40	23	24	27	292
32	Lena Häcki (SUI)	4	29	43	22	0	0	—	8	28	28	18	0	—	0	8	6	0	0	—	0	—	3	11	25	21	—	254
33	Olena Pidhrushna (UKR)	28	12	18	26	14	0	0	26	36	DNF	25	0	DNS	24	—	7	DNS	31	—	DNS	—	—	—	—	—	—	247
34	Magdalena Gwizdoń (POL)	0	0	—	14	0	0	4	—	34	10	29	31	26	0	—	3	16	4	—	23	26	14	0	3	0	—	237
35	Franziska Preuß (GER)	43	16	27	—	—	31	38	38	—	—	—	10	27	—	—	—	—	—	—	—	—	—	—	—	—	—	230
36	Monika Hojnisz (POL)	0	0	0	17	27	24	20	10	10	11	—	0	DNS	36	18	2	0	11	—	29	7	2	0	1	0	—	225
37	Anastasiya Merkushyna (UKR)	0	0	—	—	—	0	0	—	22	2	—	18	18	0	—	31	34	8	27	10	3	11	1	0	5	—	190
38	Irina Starykh (RUS)	—	—	—	—	—	—	—	—	—	—	—	—	—	—	—	17	43	0	26	0	21	17	22	26	14	—	186
39	Iryna Kryuko (BLR)	0	30	26	8	23	5	3	—	19	0	—	0	2	0	—	5	0	27	—	22	15	0	—	0	—	—	185
40	Anastasiya Kuzmina (SVK)	—	—	—	38	10	DNS	—	—	—	—	—	5	11	—	—	34	28	—	18	—	—	26	6	0	—	—	176
41	Iryna Varvynets (UKR)	7	18	0	0	—	22	25	DNS	0	DNS	—	0	21	—	—	—	—	21	—	0	17	8	36	0	—	—	175
42	Mona Brorsson (SWE)	18	0	0	0	—	—	—	—	12	0	—	0	5	19	—	0	0	0	—	34	19	16	29	8	9	—	169
43	Anna Frolina (KOR)	3	0	—	0	0	0	—	—	29	21	4	0	0	2	—	23	8	7	—	15	24	0	DNS	31	0	—	167
44	Nadine Horchler (GER)	—	—	—	—	—	—	—	—	6	24	—	—	—	22	60	0	9	—	—	0	0	21	20	0	—	—	162
45	Olga Podchufarova (RUS)	27	0	0	28	12	10	12	—	0	12	—	0	DNS	34	—	—	—	15	—	—	—	—	—	—	—	—	150
46	Ekaterina Glazyrina (RUS)	38	0	0	19	29	0	—	—	13	13	—	12	7	16	—	—	—	—	—	—	—	—	—	—	—	—	147
47	Hanna Oeberg (SWE)	34	0	—	0	—	0	11	—	—	—	—	36	40	6	—	1	0	0	—	DNS	—	0	—	0	0	—	128
48	Fanny Horn Birkeland (NOR)	0	28	5	9	0	32	6	4	11	25	—	0	—	0	—	0	—	0	—	—	—	—	—	—	—	—	120
49	Denise Herrmann (GER)	—	—	—	23	20	0	—	—	—	—	—	—	—	—	—	—	—	—	—	16	8	23	0	17	7	—	114
50	Rosanna Crawford (CAN)	0	0	—	0	0	4	9	—	20	19	12	0	DNS	—	—	15	0	0	—	11	22	—	—	—	—	—	112
51	Kaia Wøien Nicolaisen (NOR)	—	—	—	—	—	6	0	—	0	LAP	—	—	—	27	32	0	20	0	—	0	—	—	—	16	6	—	107
52	Darya Usanova (KAZ)	14	0	—	15	4	—	—	—	16	16	—	0	—	0	—	0	0	—	—	0	0	27	12	0	—	—	104
53	Lucie Charvátová (CZE)	0	23	29	0	—	0	—	—	0	—	—	0	0	9	—	9	7	0	—	0	—	0	7	9	8	—	101
54	Daria Virolaynen (RUS)	—	—	—	—	—	—	—	—	—	—	—	—	—	—	—	—	—	—	—	—	—	43	24	5	18	—	90
55	Chardine Sloof (SWE)	—	—	—	—	—	0	—	—	31	27	26	—	—	3	—	0	0	—	—	0	—	0	0	—	—	—	87
56	Clare Egan (USA)	1	0	11	0	0	0	—	—	0	0	—	0	—	0	—	21	0	19	14	8	5	0	0	7	0	—	86
57	Miriam Gössner (GER)	0	4	0	31	16	0	0	—	15	17	—	0	0	—	—	—	—	—	—	—	—	—	—	—	—	—	83
58	Irina Uslugina (RUS)	—	—	—	—	—	—	—	—	0	8	—	7	19	0	—	26	2	—	—	4	0	1	9	2	0	—	78
59	Julia Ransom (CAN)	0	3	0	7	7	15	22	—	—	—	—	0	0	0	—	0	—	23	—	0	0	0	0	0	0	—	77
60	Jana Gereková (SVK)	0	0	—	—	—	12	0	—	18	15	—	0	—	DNS	—	0	—	0	—	14	16	—	—	—	—	—	75
#	Name	ÖST IN	ÖST SP	ÖST PU	POK SP	POK PU	NOV SP	NOV PU	NOV MS	OBE SP	OBE PU	OBE MS	RUH SP	RUH PU	ANT IN	ANT MS	HOC SP	HOC PU	HOC IN	HOC MS	PYE SP	PYE PU	KON SP	KON PU	OSL SP	OSL PU	OSL MS	Total
61	Emma Nilsson (SWE)	0	17	3	10	18	0	7	—	—	—	—	1	0	0	—	—	—	0	—	0	—	0	5	0	1	—	62
62	Fuyuko Tachizaki (JPN)	15	0	1	3	0	19	1	—	0	0	—	15	0	0	—	0	—	0	—	1	6	0	—	0	—	—	61
63	Krystyna Guzik (POL)	0	0	4	0	—	0	2	—	30	1	—	0	—	18	—	0	0	0	—	0	—	0	0	0	—	—	55
64	Darya Yurkevich (BLR)	48	0	0	0	DNS	—	—	—	0	LAP	—	—	—	0	—	—	—	6	—	0	0	0	—	—	—	—	54
65	Ivona Fialková (SVK)	0	0	—	0	0	0	—	—	—	—	—	0	—	—	—	—	—	0	—	24	18	0	0	12	0	—	54
66	Dunja Zdouc (AUT)	—	—	—	—	—	—	—	—	—	—	—	10	0	13	—	0	0	30	—	—	—	0	—	—	—	—	53
67	Julia Schwaiger (AUT)	13	0	—	—	—	0	0	—	—	—	—	—	—	—	—	—	—	—	—	—	—	—	—	27	13	—	53
68	Tang Jialin (CHN)	—	—	—	—	—	—	—	—	21	23	6	0	—	0	—	0	0	0	—	0	0	—	—	0	—	—	50
69	Alina Raikova (KAZ)	0	—	—	—	—	11	0	—	0	LAP	—	0	—	—	—	—	—	12	—	12	13	0	0	0	—	—	48
70	Baiba Bendika (LAT)	5	0	0	0	0	0	—	—	—	—	—	0	16	0	—	0	14	0	—	0	9	0	—	0	0	—	44
71	Ekaterina Avvakumova (KOR)	—	—	—	—	—	—	—	—	—	—	—	—	—	—	—	0	—	40	2	0	0	0	—	0	—	—	42
72	Svetlana Sleptsova (RUS)	9	0	—	0	3	0	5	—	—	—	—	—	—	—	—	8	17	0	—	0	—	—	—	—	—	—	42
73	Ekaterina Shumilova (RUS)	23	—	—	—	—	—	—	—	—	—	—	—	—	—	—	—	—	—	—	—	—	18	0	—	—	—	41
74	Uliana Kaisheva (RUS)	—	—	—	—	—	—	—	—	14	14	—	4	8	0	—	—	—	—	—	—	—	—	—	—	—	—	40
75	Yuliya Zhuravok (UKR)	30	0	—	0	0	0	0	—	0	0	—	—	—	7	—	—	—	—	—	—	—	—	—	—	—	—	37
76	Victoria Slivko (RUS)	—	—	—	—	—	—	—	—	—	—	—	—	—	—	—	—	—	—	—	—	—	0	3	11	17	—	31
77	Julia Simon (FRA)	—	—	—	—	—	—	—	—	—	—	—	0	1	—	—	—	—	—	—	—	—	—	—	16	11	—	28
78	Hilde Fenne (NOR)	—	—	—	0	5	—	—	—	0	4	—	0	—	—	—	0	0	—	—	0	0	5	13	—	—	—	27
79	Valj Semerenko (UKR)	—	—	—	—	—	—	—	—	—	—	—	11	13	0	—	0	—	—	—	0	DNS	—	—	—	—	—	24
80	Zhang Yan (CHN)	—	—	—	—	—	—	—	—	0	—	—	0	—	1	—	0	—	22	—	0	—	—	—	0	—	—	23
81	Olga Poltoranina (KAZ)	—	0	0	0	—	0	0	—	—	—	—	—	—	15	—	4	4	0	—	—	—	0	—	0	—	—	23
82	Iana Bondar (UKR)	0	2	8	0	—	13	DNS	—	—	—	—	DNS	—	0	—	—	—	—	—	—	—	—	—	—	—	—	23
83	Anastasia Zagoruiko (RUS)	—	0	12	0	—	9	0	—	—	—	—	—	—	—	—	—	—	—	—	—	—	—	—	—	—	—	21
84	Joanne Reid (USA)	12	0	0	0	—	0	0	—	DNS	—	—	0	—	0	—	0	3	0	—	6	0	0	0	0	—	—	21
85	Megan Tandy (CAN)	0	0	—	0	DNF	0	0	—	0	—	—	0	DNS	8	—	0	—	0	—	2	11	DNS	—	—	—	—	21
86	Emma Lunder (CAN)	—	—	—	—	—	0	—	—	0	—	—	0	—	20	—	0	—	0	—	0	0	0	0	0	—	—	20
87	Christina Rieder (AUT)	0	7	13	0	—	0	—	—	—	—	—	—	—	0	—	—	—	0	—	0	—	0	0	—	—	—	20
88	Aita Gasparin (SUI)	0	0	—	0	—	0	0	—	—	—	—	0	—	—	—	0	0	13	—	3	4	0	—	0	0	—	20
89	Fabienne Hartweger (AUT)	19	0	0	0	—	—	—	—	—	—	—	0	—	0	—	0	—	0	—	0	—	0	—	—	—	—	19
90	Enora Latuilliere (FRA)	—	—	—	—	—	—	—	—	—	—	—	—	—	—	—	—	—	—	—	—	—	—	—	4	15	—	19
#	Name	ÖST IN	ÖST SP	ÖST PU	POK SP	POK PU	NOV SP	NOV PU	NOV MS	OBE SP	OBE PU	OBE MS	RUH SP	RUH PU	ANT IN	ANT MS	HOC SP	HOC PU	HOC IN	HOC MS	PYE SP	PYE PU	KON SP	KON PU	OSL SP	OSL PU	OSL MS	Total
91	Emilia Yordanova (BUL)	0	0	0	0	—	0	—	—	0	—	—	0	0	0	—	0	0	17	—	0	—	0	—	0	—	—	17
92	Marketa Davidova (CZE)	—	—	—	—	—	0	—	—	—	—	—	13	0	—	—	—	—	—	—	—	—	—	—	—	—	—	13
93	Anna Kistanova (KAZ)	11	0	—	0	—	0	0	—	0	—	—	0	LAP	0	—	0	0	0	—	0	0	—	—	—	—	—	11
94	Amanda Lightfoot (GBR)	0	0	—	0	—	0	—	—	0	—	—	0	—	0	—	0	—	9	—	—	—	—	—	DNS	—	—	9
94	Elisa Gasparin (SUI)	—	—	—	—	—	—	—	—	—	—	—	—	—	0	—	0	—	0	—	9	0	DNS	—	0	—	—	9
96	Elisabeth Högberg (SWE)	—	—	—	0	DNS	—	—	—	5	3	—	—	—	—	—	—	—	—	—	—	—	—	—	—	—	—	8
97	Sari Furuya (JPN)	6	0	—	0	—	0	0	—	0	—	—	0	—	0	—	0	0	0	—	0	—	0	—	0	—	—	6
98	Anja Eržen (SLO)	0	0	—	4	0	DNS	—	—	0	0	—	0	0	0	—	0	—	0	—	0	—	0	—	0	0	—	4
99	Sanna Markkanen (FIN)	—	—	—	0	—	—	—	—	0	—	—	0	—	4	—	—	—	0	—	—	—	0	—	0	LAP	—	4
100	Olga Abramova (UKR)	—	—	—	—	—	—	—	—	—	—	—	—	—	—	—	—	—	—	—	0	—	0	0	0	3	—	3
101	Nadzeya Pisareva (BLR)	—	0	0	2	0	0	—	—	0	—	—	0	—	0	—	0	—	—	—	0	—	0	—	—	—	—	2
102	Kinga Mitoraj (POL)	DNS	1	0	0	—	0	—	—	0	—	—	0	—	—	—	0	—	—	—	0	0	0	—	0	—	—	1
