= Biathlon at the 2018 Winter Olympics – Women's relay =

Women's relay at the XXIII Olympic Winter Games
- Pictogram for biathlon
- Venue: Alpensia Biathlon Centre in Pyeongchang, South Korea
- Date: 22 February 2018
- Competitors: 72 from 18 nations
- Winning time: 1:12:03.4

Medalists
1st place, gold medalist(s)		Nadezhda Skardino; Iryna Kryuko; Dzinara Alimbekava; Darya Domracheva	Belarus
2nd place, silver medalist(s)		Linn Persson; Mona Brorsson; Anna Magnusson; Hanna Öberg	Sweden
3rd place, bronze medalist(s)		Anaïs Chevalier; Marie Dorin Habert; Justine Braisaz; Anaïs Bescond	France

The women's 4 × 6 km relay biathlon competition of the Pyeongchang 2018 Olympics was held on 22 February 2018 at the Alpensia Biathlon Centre in Pyeongchang, South Korea.

== Schedule ==
All times are (UTC+9).

Date	Time	Round
22 February	20:15	Final

== Results ==
The race started at 20:15.

Rank	Bib	Country	Time	Penalties (P+S)	Deficit
1st place, gold medalist(s)	10	Belarus Nadezhda Skardino; Iryna Kryuko; Dzinara Alimbekava; Darya Domracheva	1:12:03.4; 17:35.2; 18:08.2; 18:52.4; 17:27.6	0+3 0+6; 0+0 0+2; 0+1 0+0; 0+2 0+1; 0+0 0+3	—
2nd place, silver medalist(s)	3	Sweden Linn Persson; Mona Brorsson; Anna Magnusson; Hanna Öberg	1:12:14.1; 17:35.1; 19:16.8; 18:25.9; 16:56.3	0+7 0+5; 0+2 0+2; 0+3 0+3; 0+2 0+0; 0+0 0+0	+10.7
3rd place, bronze medalist(s)	2	France Anaïs Chevalier; Marie Dorin Habert; Justine Braisaz; Anaïs Bescond	1:12:21.0; 17:20.8; 18:25.6; 18:40.6; 17:54.0	0+6 0+8; 0+1 0+2; 0+1 0+1; 0+3 0+3; 0+1 0+2	+17.6
4	7	Norway Synnøve Solemdal; Tiril Eckhoff; Ingrid Landmark Tandrevold; Marte Olsbu	1:12:33.1; 17:09.8; 18:49.5; 19:18.9; 17:14.9	0+2 3+10; 0+0 0+1; 0+1 1+3; 0+1 2+3; 0+0 0+3	+29.7
5	17	Slovakia Paulína Fialková; Anastasiya Kuzmina; Terézia Poliaková; Ivona Fialková	1:12:41.8; 17:07.8; 18:30.5; 18:59.4; 18:04.1	0+3 1+6; 0+1 0+0; 0+1 1+3; 0+1 0+1; 0+0 0+2	+38.4
6	8	Switzerland Elisa Gasparin; Lena Häcki; Selina Gasparin; Irene Cadurisch	1:12:46.9; 17:32.8; 18:15.5; 18:56.7; 18:01.9	0+8 0+8; 0+1 0+0; 0+3 0+2; 0+2 0+3; 0+2 0+3	+43.5
7	9	Poland Monika Hojnisz; Magdalena Gwizdoń; Krystyna Guzik; Weronika Nowakowska	1:12:47.0; 17:29.3; 18:18.6; 18:30.8; 18:28.3	1+7 0+7; 0+1 0+2; 0+1 0+1; 1+3 0+1; 0+2 0+3	+43.6
8	1	Germany Franziska Preuß; Denise Herrmann; Franziska Hildebrand; Laura Dahlmeier	1:12:57.3; 17:49.6; 19:07.4; 18:33.9; 17:26.4	1+3 2+8; 0+0 1+3; 0+0 1+3; 1+3 0+1; 0+0 0+1	+53.9
9	5	Italy Lisa Vittozzi; Dorothea Wierer; Nicole Gontier; Federica Sanfilippo	1:13:07.5; 16:49.0; 18:47.4; 18:55.0; 18:36.1	2+7 2+6; 0+1 0+0; 2+3 0+0; 0+3 1+3; 0+0 1+3	+1:04.1
10	11	Canada Sarah Beaudry; Julia Ransom; Emma Lunder; Rosanna Crawford	1:13:36.8; 18:04.0; 18:27.7; 19:09.6; 17:55.5	1+4 0+7; 0+0 0+3; 0+0 0+3; 1+3 0+0; 0+1 0+1	+1:33.4
11	4	Ukraine Iryna Varvynets; Vita Semerenko; Yuliia Dzhima; Anastasiya Merkushyna	1:13:44.8; 18:30.9; 19:15.4; 17:38.7; 18:19.8	0+3 2+7; 0+0 1+3; 0+0 1+3; 0+1 0+1; 0+2 0+0	+1:41.4
12	6	Czech Republic Eva Puskarčíková; Jessica Jislová; Markéta Davidová; Veronika Vítková	1:13:59.7; 17:21.4; 19:56.1; 18:57.9; 17:44.3	0+1 4+10; 0+1 0+2; 0+0 2+3; 0+0 2+3; 0+0 0+2	+1:56.3
13	18	United States Susan Dunklee; Clare Egan; Joanne Reid; Emily Dreissigacker	1:14:05.3; 16:56.6; 18:42.4; 19:01.1; 19:25.2	1+5 0+5; 0+0 0+1; 0+0 0+0; 1+3 0+1; 0+2 0+3	+2:01.9
14	14	Kazakhstan Galina Vishnevskaya; Darya Klimina; Alina Raikova; Olga Poltoranina	1:14:18.0; 17:50.2; 19:54.3; 18:28.3; 18:05.2	0+2 1+7; 0+0 0+3; 0+1 1+3; 0+1 0+1; 0+0 0+0	+2:14.6
15	13	Finland Laura Toivanen; Kaisa Mäkäräinen; Mari Laukkanen; Venla Lehtonen	1:14:37.2; 17:36.8; 17:45.4; 20:09.2; 19:05.8	0+6 2+7; 0+1 0+0; 0+0 0+2; 0+2 2+3; 0+3 0+2	+2:33.8
16	16	Bulgaria Emilia Yordanova; Daniela Kadeva; Stefani Popova; Desislava Stoyanova	1:14:38.0; 18:24.4; 18:33.2; 19:27.6; 18:12.8	1+3 1+6; 0+0 1+3; 0+0 0+1; 1+3 0+1; 0+0 0+1	+2:34.6
17	12	Japan Fuyuko Tachizaki; Sari Furuya; Rina Mitsuhashi; Yurie Tanaka	1:15:47.7; 17:51.6; 19:50.2; 18:40.0; 19:25.9	0+2 2+7; 0+0 0+2; 0+1 2+3; 0+1 0+0; 0+0 0+2	+3:44.3
18	15	South Korea Anna Frolina; Ekaterina Avvakumova; Mun Ji-hee; Ko Eun-jung	1:20:20.6; 20:32.3; 18:33.9; 19:24.5; 21:49.9	0+5 6+11; 0+2 4+3; 0+1 0+2; 0+1 1+3; 0+1 1+3	+8:17.2
