= Biathlon World Championships 2017 – Women's relay =

Women's relay at the Biathlon World Championships 2017
- Location: Hochfilzen, Austria
- Dates: 17 February
- Competitors: 92 from 23 nations
- Teams: 23
- Winning time: 1:11:16.6

Medalists
gold medal	Vanessa Hinz; Maren Hammerschmidt; Franziska Hildebrand; Laura Dahlmeier	Germany
silver medal	Iryna Varvynets; Yuliia Dzhima; Anastasiya Merkushyna; Olena Pidhrushna	Ukraine
bronze medal	Anaïs Chevalier; Célia Aymonier; Justine Braisaz; Marie Dorin Habert	France

The Women's relay competition at the 2017 World Championships was held on 17 February 2017.

== Results ==
The race was started at 14:45.

Rank	Bib	Team	Time	Penalties (P+S)	Deficit
1st place, gold medalist(s)	1	Germany; Vanessa Hinz; Maren Hammerschmidt; Franziska Hildebrand; Laura Dahlmeier	1:11:16.6; 18:03.6; 17:58.5; 18:13.9; 17:00.6	0+2 0+7; 0+0 0+2; 0+1 0+3; 0+0 0+0; 0+1 0+2	
2nd place, silver medalist(s)	3	Ukraine; Iryna Varvynets; Yuliia Dzhima; Anastasiya Merkushyna; Olena Pidhrushna	1:11:23.0; 18:25.3; 17:56.5; 18:03.9; 16:57.3	0+2 0+2; 0+0 0+1; 0+1 0+1; 0+1 0+0; 0+0 0+0	+6.4
3rd place, bronze medalist(s)	2	France; Anaïs Chevalier; Célia Aymonier; Justine Braisaz; Marie Dorin Habert	1:11:24.7; 17:53.0; 18:31.8; 18:14.9; 16:45.0	0+3 0+4; 0+0 0+1; 0+0 0+3; 0+3 0+0; 0+0 0+0	+8.1
4	6	Czech Republic; Jessica Jislová; Eva Puskarčíková; Veronika Vítková; Gabriela Koukalová	1:11:30.6; 18:31.3; 17:56.0; 18:17.6; 16:45.7	0+3 0+3; 0+0 0+0; 0+1 0+1; 0+2 0+2; 0+0 0+0	+14.0
5	5	Italy; Lisa Vittozzi; Federica Sanfilippo; Alexia Runggaldier; Dorothea Wierer	1:11:53.1; 18:00.5; 17:55.6; 18:49.3; 17:07.7	0+2 0+4; 0+0 0+1; 0+0 0+1; 0+2 0+1; 0+0 0+1	+36.5
6	8	Sweden; Mona Brorsson; Hanna Öberg; Emma Nilsson; Anna Magnusson	1:12:37.0; 18:36.6; 17:58.6; 18:30.1; 17:31.7	0+2 0+5; 0+0 0+2; 0+1 0+0; 0+1 0+1; 0+0 0+2	+1:20.4
7	10	Poland; Magdalena Gwizdoń; Monika Hojnisz; Kinga Mitoraj; Krystyna Guzik	1:12:39.7; 18:09.7; 18:21.9; 18:43.4; 17:24.7	0+2 0+4; 0+0 0+1; 0+2 0+1; 0+0 0+2; 0+0 0+0	+1:23.1
8	16	Slovakia; Paulína Fialková; Anastasiya Kuzmina; Ivona Fialková; Jana Gereková	1:12:53.5; 18:39.6; 17:59.5; 18:47.9; 17:26.5	0+4 0+3; 0+1 0+2; 0+1 0+1; 0+2 0+0; 0+0 0+0	+1:36.9
9	9	Belarus; Nadezhda Skardino; Iryna Kryuko; Nadzeya Pisarava; Darya Domracheva	1:13:07.3; 18:15.6; 18:18.8; 18:58.1; 17:34.8	0+2 0+3; 0+0 0+1; 0+0 0+0; 0+2 0+1; 0+0 0+1	+1:50.7
10	7	Russia; Olga Podchufarova; Svetlana Sleptsova; Irina Starykh; Tatiana Akimova	1:13:32.1; 18:23.2; 18:36.2; 17:44.2; 18:48.5	1+4 0+4; 0+1 0+1; 0+0 0+2; 0+0 0+0; 1+3 0+1	+2:15.5
11	4	Norway; Kaia Wøien Nicolaisen; Hilde Fenne; Tiril Eckhoff; Marte Olsbu	1:13:32.7; 19:16.4; 18:12.0; 18:21.4; 17:42.9	0+2 1+7; 0+2 0+0; 0+0 0+2; 0+0 1+3; 0+0 0+2	+2:16.1
12	15	Kazakhstan; Galina Vishnevskaya; Darya Usanova; Olga Poltoranina; Alina Raikova	1:13:51.7; 18:35.9; 18:34.9; 18:18.8; 18:22.1	0+2 0+7; 0+0 0+3; 0+2 0+3; 0+0 0+0; 0+0 0+1	+2:35.1
13	12	Switzerland; Aita Gasparin; Selina Gasparin; Lena Häcki; Elisa Gasparin	1:14:40.2; 19:34.8; 18:18.2; 18:54.1; 17:53.1	0+2 0+6; 0+0 0+3; 0+1 0+1; 0+1 0+2; 0+0 0+0	+3:23.6
14	22	United States; Clare Egan; Susan Dunklee; Joanne Reid; Madeleine Phaneuf	1:14:53.6; 19:13.5; 17:19.3; 19:15.8; 19:05.0	0+3 0+10; 0+1 0+3; 0+0 0+2; 0+1 0+3; 0+1 0+2	+3:37.0
15	14	Finland; Laura Toivanen; Mari Laukkanen; Sanna Markkanen; Kaisa Mäkäräinen	1:16:47.5; 19:02.4; 18:55.5; 21:28.2; 17:21.4	1+6 2+4; 0+1 0+0; 1+3 0+0; 0+2 2+3; 0+0 0+1	+5:30.9
16	13	Canada; Rosanna Crawford; Julia Ransom; Megan Tandy; Emma Lunder	1:17:16.0; 18:59.0; 19:59.6; 19:19.0; 18:58.4	0+6 2+7; 0+1 0+1; 0+1 2+3; 0+2 0+2; 0+2 0+1	+5:59.4
17	23	Slovenia; Teja Gregorin; Anja Eržen; Urška Poje; Polona Klemenčič	1:17:25.7; 18:49.0; 18:57.1; 19:27.5; 20:12.1	0+4 0+8; 0+1 0+3; 0+0 0+3; 0+0 0+1; 0+3 0+1	+6:09.1
18	19	South Korea; Ekaterina Avvakumova; Anna Frolina; Ko Eun-jung; Mun Ji-hee	1:17:52.3; 19:20.6; 18:35.3; 20:42.9; 19:13.5	0+7 0+6; 0+2 0+2; 0+2 0+0; 0+2 0+3; 0+1 0+1	+6:35.7
19	21	Estonia; Kadri Lehtla; Meril Beilmann; Johanna Talihärm; Kristel Viigipuu	LAP; 19:31.4; 20:37.9; 19:18.9	0+5 0+3; 0+1 0+1; 0+1 0+2; 0+2 0+0; 0+1	
20	17	Japan; Fuyuko Tachizaki; Sari Furuya; Kirari Tanaka; Rina Mitsuhashi	LAP; 19:01.7; 18:32.9	0+4 2+8; 0+1 0+2; 0+1 0+3; 0+2 2+3	
21	20	Lithuania; Natalija Kočergina; Diana Rasimovičiūtė; Natalija Paulauskaitė; Gabrielė Leščinskaitė	LAP; 19:16.8; 19:47.1	0+2 1+9; 0+0 0+3; 0+1 0+3; 0+1 1+3	
22	18	Bulgaria; Emilia Yordanova; Desislava Stoyanova; Stefani Popova; Daniela Kadeva	LAP; 19:43.1; 19:09.7	2+4 2+9; 0+0 1+3; 0+1 0+3; 2+3 1+3	
—	11	Austria; Dunja Zdouc; Julia Schwaiger; Christina Rieder; Lisa Hauser	DSQ		
