= 2017–18 Biathlon World Cup – Sprint Women =

The 2017–18 Biathlon World Cup – Sprint Women started on Friday 1 December 2017 in Östersund and will finish on Friday 23 March 2018 in Tyumen. The defending titlist is Gabriela Koukalová of the Czech Republic.

== Competition format ==
The 7.5 kilometres (4.7 mi) sprint race is the third oldest biathlon event; the distance is skied over three laps. The biathlete shoots two times at any shooting lane, first prone, then standing, totalling 10 targets. For each missed target the biathlete has to complete a penalty lap of around 150 metres (490 ft). Competitors' starts are staggered, normally by 30 seconds.

== 2016–17 Top 3 standings ==
Medal	Athlete	Points
Gold:	(Czech Republic) Gabriela Koukalová	377
Silver:	(Germany) Laura Dahlmeier	372
Bronze:	(Finland) Kaisa Mäkäräinen	337

== Medal winners ==
Event	Gold	Time	Silver	Time	Bronze	Time
Östersund details	Denise Herrmann; Germany	19:54.8 (0+1)	Justine Braisaz; France	20:10.0 (0+0)	Yuliia Dzhima; Ukraine	20:14.4 (0+0)
Hochfilzen details	Darya Domracheva; Belarus	22:40.2 (0+0)	Anastasiya Kuzmina; Slovakia	23:02.3 (1+0)	Dorothea Wierer; Italy	23:10.8 (1+0)
Annecy details	Anastasiya Kuzmina; Slovakia	20:59.6 (0+0)	Laura Dahlmeier; Germany	21:33.5 (0+0)	Vita Semerenko; Ukraine	21:41.0 (0+0)
Oberhof details	Anastasiya Kuzmina; Slovakia	22:23.7 (1+0)	Kaisa Mäkäräinen; Finland	22:59.1 (0+1)	Veronika Vítková; Czech Republic	23:03.8 (1+0)
Antholz-Anterselva details	Tiril Eckhoff; Norway	21:05.3 (0+0)	Laura Dahlmeier; Germany	21:17.3 (0+0)	Veronika Vítková; Czech Republic	21:25.9 (0+0)
Kontiolahti details	Darya Domracheva; Belarus	20:56.8 (0+1)	Franziska Hildebrand; Germany	20:57.3 (0+0)	Lisa Vittozzi; Italy	21:02.3 (0+1)
Oslo Holmenkollen details	Anastasiya Kuzmina; Slovakia	21:31.8 (1+0)	Darya Domracheva; Belarus	21:40.7 (0+0)	Yuliia Dzhima; Ukraine	22:01.0 (0+0)
Tyumen details	Darya Domracheva; Belarus	21:42.8 (0+0)	Kaisa Mäkäräinen; Finland	21:44.0 (0+0)	Tiril Eckhoff; Norway	22:16.1 (1+0)

== Standings ==
#	Name	ÖST	HOC	ANN	OBE	ANT	KON	OSL	TYU	Total
1	Anastasiya Kuzmina (SVK)	26	54	60	60	23	11	60	29	323
2	Darya Domracheva (BLR)	DNF	60	—	36	43	60	54	60	313
3	Kaisa Mäkäräinen (FIN)	38	38	27	54	15	31	1	54	258
4	Laura Dahlmeier (GER)	—	25	54	28	54	40	13	38	252
5	Veronika Vítková (CZE)	34	22	25	48	48	38	30	—	245
6	Franziska Hildebrand (GER)	31	34	0	43	32	54	38	12	244
7	Lisa Vittozzi (ITA)	40	27	43	0	1	48	31	40	230
8	Dorothea Wierer (ITA)	32	48	26	25	36	23	2	36	228
9	Anaïs Bescond (FRA)	24	36	13	20	40	14	29	43	219
10	Vita Semerenko (UKR)	20	43	48	19	19	36	0	—	185
11	Ekaterina Yurlova-Percht (RUS)	14	30	21	26	38	0	36	20	185
12	Yuliia Dzhima (UKR)	48	21	14	0	DNS	43	48	—	174
13	Justine Braisaz (FRA)	54	18	34	40	17	0	—	—	163
14	Denise Herrmann (GER)	60	13	40	0	31	—	0	5	149
15	Vanessa Hinz (GER)	25	14	23	0	30	12	16	21	141
16	Tiril Eckhoff (NOR)	0	0	0	DNS	60	22	0	48	130
17	Anna Frolina (KOR)	0	0	22	27	20	24	22	7	122
18	Maren Hammerschmidt (GER)	27	8	32	17	0	32	0	3	119
19	Marie Dorin Habert (FRA)	18	7	11	0	24	34	24	—	118
20	Weronika Nowakowska-Ziemniak (POL)	21	19	30	38	—	8	0	0	116
21	Marte Olsbu (NOR)	36	28	0	—	0	20	0	31	115
22	Nadezhda Skardino (BLR)	29	15	DNS	6	13	30	17	0	110
23	Celia Aymonier (FRA)	0	31	9	13	0	7	16	27	103
24	Fuyuko Tachizaki (JPN)	0	2	0	30	0	3	40	24	99
25	Franziska Preuß (GER)	0	—	0	29	21	21	11	17	99
26	Iryna Kryuko (BLR)	0	6	28	24	0	26	—	14	98
27	Eva Puskarčíková (CZE)	9	0	15	31	18	0	23	—	96
28	Galina Vishnevskaya (KAZ)	28	0	—	0	27	16	10	15	96
29	Lena Häcki (SUI)	30	0	0	0	0	9	20	34	93
30	Lisa Theresa Hauser (AUT)	17	12	—	14	11	0	9	28	91
#	Name	ÖST	HOC	ANN	OBE	ANT	KON	OSL	TYU	Total
31	Susan Dunklee (USA)	0	0	31	0	6	5	43	—	85
32	Selina Gasparin (SUI)	5	20	38	0	2	0	20	—	85
33	Valj Semerenko (UKR)	19	24	36	DNS	0	6	0	—	85
34	Synnøve Solemdal (NOR)	43	26	—	0	0	0	0	13	82
35	Mari Laukkanen (FIN)	15	1	29	15	0	1	21	0	82
36	Anaïs Chevalier (FRA)	0	0	24	5	14	2	4	32	81
37	Ingrid Landmark Tandrevold (NOR)	—	40	—	8	—	0	18	11	77
38	Hanna Öberg (SWE)	—	DNS	20	—	—	26	28	0	74
39	Paulína Fialková (SVK)	0	0	18	—	28	0	0	26	72
40	Daria Virolaynen (RUS)	0	—	—	4	0	17	26	25	72
41	Krystyna Guzik (POL)	22	16	12	21	—	—	—	—	71
42	Elisa Gasparin (SUI)	0	0	—	0	34	0	12	22	68
43	Uliana Kaisheva (RUS)	—	—	—	—	0	16	34	16	66
44	Ivona Fialková (SVK)	0	0	0	—	4	27	32	0	63
45	Jessica Jislová (CZE)	0	0	17	0	26	19	0	—	62
46	Tatiana Akimova (RUS)	3	23	19	3	10	—	—	—	58
47	Magdalena Gwizdoń (POL)	10	6	0	22	—	18	0	—	56
48	Svetlana Mironova (RUS)	0	32	0	0	—	0	0	23	55
49	Mona Brorsson (SWE)	0	0	4	23	—	0	27	0	54
50	Hilde Fenne (NOR)	23	29	—	0	0	—	0	0	52
51	Federica Sanfilippo (ITA)	0	11	16	2	16	0	5	—	50
52	Julia Ransom (CAN)	12	0	2	32	—	0	0	—	46
53	Elisabeth Högberg (SWE)	11	—	—	10	—	0	25	—	46
54	Emma Nilsson (SWE)	16	0	0	0	0	0	14	10	40
55	Linn Persson (SWE)	1	0	0	34	—	0	0	4	39
56	Clare Egan (USA)	0	6	0	0	0	28	0	—	34
57	Anastasiya Merkushyna (UKR)	7	17	0	9	DNS	0	0	—	33
58	Rosanna Crawford (CAN)	0	0	0	—	—	29	3	—	32
59	Karolin Horchler (GER)	0	0	—	—	—	—	—	30	30
60	Julia Simon (FRA)	—	—	—	DNF	29	0	0	0	29
#	Name	ÖST	HOC	ANN	OBE	ANT	KON	OSL	TYU	Total
61	Olena Pidhrushna (UKR)	13	0	0	16	—	—	—	—	29
62	Sari Furuya (JPN)	0	0	1	12	0	13	0	0	26
63	Baiba Bendika (LAT)	0	0	0	—	25	0	0	0	25
64	Nicole Gontier (ITA)	—	—	—	0	22	0	0	—	22
65	Irina Uslugina (RUS)	—	—	—	—	0	—	—	19	19
66	Iryna Varvynets (UKR)	0	10	0	0	9	0	0	—	19
67	Katharina Innerhofer (AUT)	—	0	0	0	0	0	0	18	18
68	Sarah Beaudry (CAN)	—	—	—	18	0	0	0	—	18
69	Nadzeya Pisareva (BLR)	8	0	5	0	5	0	0	0	18
70	Dzinara Alimbekava (BLR)	—	—	8	0	0	0	DNS	9	17
71	Alexia Runggaldier (ITA)	2	DNS	—	—	12	—	—	—	14
72	Anja Eržen (SLO)	0	3	10	0	0	0	0	—	13
73	Ekaterina Avvakumova (KOR)	5	0	0	—	DNS	—	7	—	12
74	Mun Ji-hee (KOR)	0	0	0	11	0	0	—	0	11
75	Alina Raikova (KAZ)	0	0	—	1	0	10	0	0	11
76	Victoria Slivko (RUS)	6	—	0	0	—	4	0	0	10
77	Olga Podchufarova (RUS)	—	9	—	—	—	—	—	—	9
78	Irene Cadurisch (SUI)	0	0	0	0	0	0	8	0	8
79	Laura Toivanen (FIN)	—	0	0	0	8	0	0	—	8
80	Julia Schwaiger (AUT)	0	—	—	—	—	—	—	8	8
81	Emma Lunder (CAN)	0	0	7	DNS	—	0	0	—	7
82	Monika Hojnisz (POL)	0	0	—	7	—	0	0	—	7
83	Kaia Wøien Nicolaisen (NOR)	0	—	0	—	8	—	—	—	7
84	Markéta Davidová (CZE)	—	0	6	—	0	—	0	—	6
85	Kamila Żuk (POL)	—	—	0	—	0	—	6	0	6
86	Darya Klimina (KAZ)	0	0	0	0	0	0	0	6	6
87	Natalija Kočergina (LTU)	0	0	0	0	3	0	0	0	3
88	Thekla Brun-Lie (NOR)	—	—	3	—	—	0	—	—	3
89	Nadine Horchler (GER)	—	—	—	—	—	—	—	2	2
90	Meril Beilmann (EST)	—	—	—	—	0	DNS	0	1	1
