= 2016–17 Biathlon World Cup – Sprint Women =

The 2016–17 Biathlon World Cup – Sprint Women started on Saturday 3 December 2016 in Östersund and finished on Friday 17 March 2017 in Oslo Holmenkollen. The defending titlist was Gabriela Koukalová of the Czech Republic.

The small crystal globe winner for the category was Gabriela Koukalová of the Czech Republic.

== Competition format ==
The 7.5 kilometres (4.7 mi) sprint race is the third oldest biathlon event; the distance is skied over three laps. The biathlete shoots two times at any shooting lane, first prone, then standing, totalling 10 targets. For each missed target the biathlete has to complete a penalty lap of around 150 metres (490 ft). Competitors' starts are staggered, normally by 30 seconds.

== 2015–16 Top 3 standings ==
Medal	Athlete	Points
Gold:	(Czech Republic) Gabriela Soukalová	413
Silver:	(France) Marie Dorin Habert	336
Bronze:	(Italy) Dorothea Wierer	327

== Medal winners ==
Event	Gold	Time	Silver	Time	Bronze	Time
Östersund details	Marie Dorin Habert; France	20:09.7 (0+0)	Kaisa Mäkäräinen; Finland	20:21.1 (0+1)	Gabriela Koukalová; Czech Republic	20:29.6 (0+0)
Pokljuka details	Laura Dahlmeier; Germany	19:51.7 (0+0)	Justine Braisaz; France	19:55.2 (0+0)	Marte Olsbu; Norway	20:13.0 (0+0)
Nové Město details	Tatiana Akimova; Russia	21:58.9 (0+0)	Anaïs Chevalier; France	22:03.2 (0+0)	Susan Dunklee; United States	22:04.0 (0+0)
Oberhof details	Gabriela Koukalová; Czech Republic	22:28.5 (0+0)	Kaisa Mäkäräinen; Finland	22:49.8 (0+2)	Marie Dorin Habert; France	22:52.5 (0+1)
Ruhpolding details	Kaisa Mäkäräinen; Finland	20:51.8 (0+0)	Gabriela Koukalová; Czech Republic	21:13.8 (0+0)	Laura Dahlmeier; Germany	21:21.9 (0+0)
World Championships details	Gabriela Koukalová; Czech Republic	19:12.6 (0+0)	Laura Dahlmeier; Germany	19:16.6 (0+0)	Anaïs Chevalier; France	19:37.7 (0+0)
Pyeongchang details	Laura Dahlmeier; Germany	20:43.7 (0+0)	Tiril Eckhoff; Norway	20:52.1 (0+0)	Anaïs Chevalier; France	21:25.3 (0+0)
Kontiolahti details	Tiril Eckhoff; Norway	19:18.4 (0+0)	Laura Dahlmeier; Germany	19:36.7 (0+1)	Darya Domracheva; Belarus	19:38.8 (0+0)
Oslo Holmenkollen details	Mari Laukkanen; Finland	20:33.5 (0+0)	Justine Braisaz; France	20:41.4 (0+0)	Anaïs Bescond; France	20:56.6 (0+0)

== Standings ==
#	Name	ÖST	POK	NOV	OBE	RUH	HOC	PYE	KON	OSL	Total
1	Gabriela Koukalová (CZE)	48	36	28	60	54	60	20	28	43	377
2	Laura Dahlmeier (GER)	43	60	43	—	48	54	60	54	10	372
3	Kaisa Mäkäräinen (FIN)	54	43	40	54	60	29	43	0	14	337
4	Marie Dorin Habert (FRA)	60	24	30	48	43	36	DNF	32	24	297
5	Justine Braisaz (FRA)	31	54	38	2	29	13	31	29	54	281
6	Tiril Eckhoff (NOR)	36	21	27	—	22	28	54	60	29	277
7	Anaïs Chevalier (FRA)	10	0	54	43	23	48	48	34	0	260
8	Dorothea Wierer (ITA)	22	20	36	38	40	20	28	20	22	246
9	Franziska Hildebrand (GER)	25	40	26	24	38	22	36	24	6	241
10	Susan Dunklee (USA)	14	30	48	0	8	12	40	40	36	228
11	Anaïs Bescond (FRA)	19	0	34	23	32	—	34	13	48	203
12	Celia Aymonier (FRA)	24	32	29	32	0	32	5	36	0	190
13	Yuliia Dzhima (UKR)	20	13	7	26	30	19	38	7	28	188
14	Marte Olsbu (NOR)	0	48	18	17	24	0	17	10	38	172
15	Tatiana Akimova (RUS)	11	12	60	27	26	25	7	—	1	169
16	Federica Sanfilippo (ITA)	0	18	23	25	21	40	DNS	6	32	165
17	Anna Magnusson (SWE)	27	0	8	—	25	27	26	31	18	162
18	Eva Puskarčíková (CZE)	26	34	20	0	27	24	25	0	0	156
19	Selina Gasparin (SUI)	13	25	17	9	0	30	30	30	0	154
20	Lisa Theresa Hauser (AUT)	40	29	21	0	3	18	0	12	19	142
21	Darya Domracheva (BLR)	—	—	—	4	28	14	21	48	20	135
22	Lisa Vittozzi (ITA)	8	6	3	0	14	43	18	38	0	130
23	Nadezhda Skardino (BLR)	34	27	2	—	16	16	19	15	0	129
24	Maren Hammerschmidt (GER)	21	0	—	40	2	0	13	25	21	122
25	Magdalena Gwizdoń (POL)	0	14	0	34	31	3	23	14	3	122
26	Galina Vishnevskaya (KAZ)	32	16	0	3	34	0	0	19	13	117
27	Lena Häcki (SUI)	29	22	0	28	0	6	0	3	25	113
28	Veronika Vítková (CZE)	6	11	25	—	20	0	0	9	40	111
29	Anastasiya Kuzmina (SVK)	—	38	DNS	—	5	34	—	26	0	103
30	Mari Laukkanen (FIN)	0	0	16	1	—	0	—	22	60	99
#	Name	ÖST	POK	NOV	OBE	RUH	HOC	PYE	KON	OSL	Total
31	Anna Frolina (KOR)	0	0	0	29	0	23	15	0	31	98
32	Anastasiya Merkushyna (UKR)	0	—	0	22	18	31	10	11	0	92
33	Vanessa Hinz (GER)	38	0	0	7	6	38	—	DNS	0	89
34	Iryna Kryuko (BLR)	30	8	5	19	0	5	22	0	0	89
35	Teja Gregorin (SLO)	9	5	1	8	19	11	0	0	34	87
36	Monika Hojnisz (POL)	0	17	24	10	0	2	29	2	1	85
37	Olena Pidhrushna (UKR)	12	26	0	36	0	7	DNS	—	—	81
38	Fanny Horn Birkeland (NOR)	28	9	32	11	0	0	—	—	—	80
39	Paulína Fialková (SVK)	15	0	0	—	0	10	27	4	23	79
40	Denise Herrmann (GER)	—	23	0	—	—	—	16	23	17	79
41	Mona Brorsson (SWE)	0	0	—	12	0	0	34	16	8	70
42	Alexia Runggaldier (ITA)	5	1	14	0	17	0	0	0	31	68
43	Irina Starykh (RUS)	—	—	—	—	—	17	0	17	26	60
44	Darya Usanova (KAZ)	0	15	—	16	0	0	0	27	0	58
45	Franziska Preuß (GER)	16	—	31	—	10	—	—	—	—	57
46	Miriam Gössner (GER)	4	31	0	15	0	—	—	—	—	50
47	Rosanna Crawford (CAN)	0	0	4	20	0	15	11	—	—	50
48	Daria Virolaynen (RUS)	—	—	—	—	—	—	—	43	5	48
49	Iryna Varvynets (UKR)	18	0	22	0	0	—	0	8	0	48
50	Ekaterina Glazyrina (RUS)	0	19	0	13	12	—	—	—	—	44
51	Jana Gereková (SVK)	0	—	12	18	0	0	14	—	—	44
52	Lucie Charvátová (CZE)	23	0	0	0	0	9	0	0	9	41
53	Irina Uslugina (RUS)	—	—	—	0	7	26	4	1	2	40
54	Olga Podchufarova (RUS)	0	28	10	0	0	—	—	—	—	38
55	Fuyuko Tachizaki (JPN)	0	3	19	0	15	0	1	0	0	38
56	Hanna Öberg (SWE)	0	0	0	—	36	1	DNS	0	0	37
57	Ivona Fialková (SVK)	0	0	0	—	0	—	24	0	12	36
58	Clare Egan (USA)	0	0	0	0	0	21	8	0	7	36
59	Chardine Sloof (SWE)	—	—	0	31	—	0	0	0	—	31
60	Krystyna Guzik (POL)	0	0	0	30	0	0	0	0	0	30
#	Name	ÖST	POK	NOV	OBE	RUH	HOC	PYE	KON	OSL	Total
61	Emma Nilsson (SWE)	17	10	0	—	1	—	0	0	0	28
62	Julia Schwaiger (AUT)	0	—	0	—	—	—	—	—	27	27
63	Nadine Horchler (GER)	—	—	—	6	—	0	0	21	0	27
64	Julia Ransom (CAN)	3	7	15	—	0	0	0	0	0	25
65	Alina Raikova (KAZ)	—	—	11	0	0	—	12	0	0	23
66	Kaia Wøien Nicolaisen (NOR)	—	—	6	0	—	0	0	—	16	22
67	Tang Jialin (CHN)	—	—	—	21	0	0	0	—	0	21
68	Ekaterina Shumilova (RUS)	—	—	—	—	—	—	—	18	—	18
69	Uliana Kaisheva (RUS)	—	—	—	14	4	—	—	—	—	18
70	Julia Simon (FRA)	—	—	—	—	0	—	—	—	16	16
71	Iana Bondar (UKR)	2	0	13	—	DNS	—	—	—	—	15
72	Markéta Davidová (CZE)	—	—	0	—	13	—	—	—	—	13
73	Victoria Slivko (RUS)	—	—	—	—	—	—	—	0	11	11
74	Valj Semerenko (UKR)	—	—	—	—	11	0	0	—	—	11
75	Dunja Zdouc (AUT)	—	—	—	—	10	0	—	0	—	10
76	Anastasia Zagoruiko (RUS)	0	0	9	—	—	—	—	—	—	9
77	Elisa Gasparin (SUI)	—	—	—	—	—	0	9	DNS	0	9
78	Svetlana Sleptsova (RUS)	0	0	0	—	—	8	0	—	—	8
79	Christina Rieder (AUT)	7	0	0	—	—	—	0	0	—	7
80	Joanne Reid (USA)	0	0	0	DNS	0	0	6	0	0	6
81	Hilde Fenne (NOR)	—	0	—	0	0	0	0	5	—	5
82	Elisabeth Högberg (SWE)	—	0	—	5	—	—	—	—	—	5
83	Anja Eržen (SLO)	0	4	DNS	0	0	0	0	0	0	4
84	Olga Poltoranina (KAZ)	0	0	0	—	—	4	—	0	0	4
85	Enora Latuilliere (FRA)	—	—	—	—	—	—	—	—	4	4
86	Aita Gasparin (SUI)	0	0	0	—	0	0	3	0	0	3
87	Megan Tandy (CAN)	0	0	0	0	0	0	2	DNS	—	2
88	Nadzeya Pisareva (BLR)	0	2	0	0	0	0	0	0	—	2
89	Kinga Mitoraj (POL)	1	0	0	0	0	0	0	0	0	1
