= Biathlon at the 2017 Asian Winter Games – Women's mass start =

Women's 12.5 kilometre mass start at the 2017 Asian Winter Games
- Venue: Nishioka Biathlon Stadium
- Dates: 26 February 2017
- Competitors: 22 from 7 nations

Medalists
gold medal	Galina Vishnevskaya	Kazakhstan
silver medal	Alina Raikova	Kazakhstan
bronze medal	Fuyuko Tachizaki	Japan

The women's 12.5 kilometre mass start at the 2017 Asian Winter Games was held on February 26, 2017, at the Nishioka Biathlon Stadium.

== Schedule ==
All times are Japan Standard Time (UTC+09:00)

Date	Time	Event
Sunday, 26 February 2017	12:00	Final

== Results ==
Legend

- DNS — Did not start

Rank	Athlete	Penalties					Time
Rank	Athlete	P	P	S	S	Total	Time
1st place, gold medalist(s)	Galina Vishnevskaya (KAZ)	0	1	0	0	1	39:26.6
2nd place, silver medalist(s)	Alina Raikova (KAZ)	0	0	1	0	1	40:11.0
3	Darya Usanova (KAZ)	0	1	1	3	5	40:59.7
3rd place, bronze medalist(s)	Fuyuko Tachizaki (JPN)	0	0	3	1	4	41:25.4
5	Zhang Yan (CHN)	1	1	1	0	3	41:31.5
6	Tang Jialin (CHN)	1	1	2	1	5	42:21.3
7	Meng Fanqi (CHN)	1	1	2	0	4	42:48.3
8	Yurie Tanaka (JPN)	2	0	2	0	4	43:05.5
9	Anna Kistanova (KAZ)	2	1	3	0	6	43:52.6
10	Sari Furuya (JPN)	3	0	2	1	6	44:06.3
11	Rina Mitsuhashi (JPN)	1	2	2	2	7	44:28.3
12	Jung Ju-mi (KOR)	1	0	1	0	2	44:31.5
13	Ko Eun-jung (KOR)	1	1	1	0	3	45:09.9
14	Mun Ji-hee (KOR)	4	1	1	1	7	46:18.7
15	Park Ji-ae (KOR)	2	0	3	1	6	47:23.2
16	Ma Chun (CHN)	3	2	3	2		Lapped
17	Otgondavaagiin Uranbaigali (MGL)	1	2	3			Lapped
18	Enkhbayaryn Ariunzul (MGL)	2	4	3			Lapped
19	Jillian Colebourn (AUS)	3	4	2			Lapped
—	Darcie Morton (AUS)						DNS
—	Natalia Levdanskaia (KGZ)						DNS
—	Kunduz Abdykadyrova (KGZ)						DNS

- Fuyuko Tachizaki was awarded bronze because of no three-medal sweep per country rule.
