= Biathlon at the 2017 Asian Winter Games – Women's pursuit =

Women's 10 kilometre pursuit at the 2017 Asian Winter Games
- Venue: Nishioka Biathlon Stadium
- Dates: 24 February 2017
- Competitors: 22 from 7 nations

Medalists
gold medal	Galina Vishnevskaya	Kazakhstan
silver medal	Zhang Yan	China
bronze medal	Darya Usanova	Kazakhstan

The women's 10 kilometre pursuit at the 2017 Asian Winter Games was held on February 24, 2017, at the Nishioka Biathlon Stadium.

== Schedule ==
All times are Japan Standard Time (UTC+09:00)

Date	Time	Event
Friday, 24 February 2017	12:00	Final

== Results ==
Rank	Athlete	Start	Penalties					Time
Rank	Athlete	Start	P	P	S	S	Total	Time
1st place, gold medalist(s)	Galina Vishnevskaya (KAZ)	0:00	0	2	0	0	2	35:03.1
2nd place, silver medalist(s)	Zhang Yan (CHN)	0:24	0	1	0	2	3	36:20.6
3rd place, bronze medalist(s)	Darya Usanova (KAZ)	0:55	2	2	2	0	6	36:42.4
4	Tang Jialin (CHN)	1:40	0	0	1	1	2	37:23.8
5	Alina Raikova (KAZ)	0:51	0	1	2	1	4	37:54.1
6	Yurie Tanaka (JPN)	2:38	0	0	1	0	1	38:31.4
7	Meng Fanqi (CHN)	1:38	2	0	1	1	4	38:35.7
8	Anna Kistanova (KAZ)	1:32	2	2	1	2	7	39:10.4
9	Fuyuko Tachizaki (JPN)	2:32	1	1	1	2	5	39:33.9
10	Mun Ji-hee (KOR)	1:34	1	1	2	0	4	39:52.7
11	Rina Mitsuhashi (JPN)	3:17	1	1	3	2	7	42:52.1
12	Park Ji-ae (KOR)	4:10	1	2	1	2	6	42:58.2
13	Jung Ju-mi (KOR)	3:00	2	0	2	2	6	43:17.4
14	Darcie Morton (AUS)	5:05	1	0	1			Lapped
15	Ko Eun-jung (KOR)	2:45	2	2	2			Lapped
16	Sari Furuya (JPN)	2:12	5	1	4			Lapped
17	Otgondavaagiin Uranbaigali (MGL)	7:25	1	4				Lapped
18	Enkhbayaryn Ariunzul (MGL)	7:16	3	1				Lapped
19	Jillian Colebourn (AUS)	5:24	2	0				Lapped
20	Ma Chun (CHN)	4:55	3	4				Lapped
21	Natalia Levdanskaia (KGZ)	8:45	5					Lapped
22	Kunduz Abdykadyrova (KGZ)	12:02	5					Lapped
