= Biathlon at the 2017 Asian Winter Games – Women's sprint =

Women's 7.5 kilometre sprint at the 2017 Asian Winter Games
- Venue: Nishioka Biathlon Stadium
- Dates: 23 February 2017
- Competitors: 22 from 7 nations

Medalists
gold medal	Galina Vishnevskaya	Kazakhstan
silver medal	Zhang Yan	China
bronze medal	Alina Raikova	Kazakhstan

The women's 7.5 kilometre sprint at the 2017 Asian Winter Games was held on February 23, 2017 at the Nishioka Biathlon Stadium.

== Schedule ==
All times are Japan Standard Time (UTC+09:00)

Date	Time	Event
Thursday, 23 February 2017	12:00	Final

== Results ==
Rank	Athlete	Penalties			Time
Rank	Athlete	P	S	Total	Time
1st place, gold medalist(s)	Galina Vishnevskaya (KAZ)	0	1	1	20:32.6
2nd place, silver medalist(s)	Zhang Yan (CHN)	0	0	0	20:56.8
3rd place, bronze medalist(s)	Alina Raikova (KAZ)	0	1	1	21:23.2
4	Darya Usanova (KAZ)	1	2	3	21:27.3
5	Anna Kistanova (KAZ)	1	2	3	22:04.8
6	Mun Ji-hee (KOR)	0	1	1	22:07.1
7	Meng Fanqi (CHN)	0	1	1	22:10.8
8	Tang Jialin (CHN)	0	1	1	22:12.3
9	Sari Furuya (JPN)	1	2	3	22:44.3
10	Fuyuko Tachizaki (JPN)	1	4	5	23:04.3
11	Yurie Tanaka (JPN)	1	2	3	23:10.6
12	Ko Eun-jung (KOR)	1	0	1	23:18.1
13	Jung Ju-mi (KOR)	2	0	2	23:32.2
14	Rina Mitsuhashi (JPN)	2	3	5	23:49.7
15	Park Ji-ae (KOR)	3	2	5	24:42.5
16	Ma Chun (CHN)	1	3	4	25:27.7
17	Darcie Morton (AUS)	3	1	4	25:37.9
18	Jillian Colebourn (AUS)	2	2	4	25:56.2
19	Enkhbayaryn Ariunzul (MGL)	4	2	6	27:49.0
20	Otgondavaagiin Uranbaigali (MGL)	4	1	5	27:57.5
21	Natalia Levdanskaia (KGZ)	0	2	2	29:17.6
22	Kunduz Abdykadyrova (KGZ)	2	4	6	32:35.0
