= 2016–17 Biathlon World Cup – Pursuit Women =

The 2016–17 Biathlon World Cup – Pursuit Women started on Sunday 4 December 2016 in Östersund and finished on Saturday 18 March 2017 in Oslo Holmenkollen. The defending titlist was Gabriela Koukalová of the Czech Republic.

The small crystal globe winner for the category was Laura Dahlmeier of Germany.

== Competition format ==
The 10 kilometres (6.2 mi) pursuit race is skied over five laps. The biathlete shoots four times at any shooting lane, in the order of prone, prone, standing, standing, totalling 20 targets. For each missed target a biathlete has to run a 150 metres (490 ft) penalty loop. Competitors' starts are staggered, according to the result of the previous sprint race.

== 2015–16 Top 3 standings ==
Medal	Athlete	Points
Gold:	(Czech Republic) Gabriela Soukalová	354
Silver:	(Italy) Dorothea Wierer	348
Bronze:	(France) Marie Dorin Habert	331

== Medal winners ==
Event	Gold	Time	Silver	Time	Bronze	Time
Östersund details	Gabriela Koukalová; Czech Republic	31:43.3 (0+0+1+0)	Laura Dahlmeier; Germany	31:51.7 (0+1+1+0)	Dorothea Wierer; Italy	32:04.7 (0+0+0+0)
Pokljuka details	Laura Dahlmeier; Germany	30:43.1 (0+2+0+0)	Kaisa Mäkäräinen; Finland	30:59.9 (0+0+1+1)	Eva Puskarčíková; Czech Republic	31:01.8 (1+0+0+0)
Nové Město details	Anaïs Chevalier; France	30:38.1 (1+0+0+0)	Dorothea Wierer; Italy	30:47.6 (0+1+1+0)	Tatiana Akimova; Russia	30:57.5 (1+0+0+0)
Oberhof details	Marie Dorin Habert; France	34:33.3 (1+0+0+1)	Gabriela Koukalová; Czech Republic	35:12.1 (0+0+1+2)	Kaisa Mäkäräinen; Finland	35:52.4 (1+0+1+2)
Ruhpolding details	Kaisa Mäkäräinen; Finland	30:58.0 (0+0+1+0)	Gabriela Koukalová; Czech Republic	31:58.9 (2+0+0+0)	Marie Dorin Habert; France	32:21.1 (1+0+1+1)
World Championships details	Laura Dahlmeier; Germany	28:02.3 (1+0+0+0)	Darya Domracheva; Belarus	28:13.9 (0+0+0+0)	Gabriela Koukalová; Czech Republic	28:18.9 (2+0+1+0)
Pyeongchang details	Laura Dahlmeier; Germany	27:58.0 (0+0+0+0)	Kaisa Mäkäräinen; Finland	29:10.6 (0+0+2+0)	Anaïs Bescond; France	29:16.9 (0+0+1+0)
Kontiolahti details	Laura Dahlmeier; Germany	29:54.4 (0+1+0+0)	Marie Dorin Habert; France	30:10.9 (1+0+0+1)	Lisa Vittozzi; Italy	30:14.3 (0+1+0+0)
Oslo Holmenkollen details	Mari Laukkanen; Finland	29:33.3 (0+0+0+1)	Gabriela Koukalová; Czech Republic	29:59.8 (0+0+0+0)	Justine Braisaz; France	30:34.7 (1+1+0+2)

== Standings ==
#	Name	ÖST	POK	NOV	OBE	RUH	HOC	PYE	KON	OSL	Total
1	Laura Dahlmeier (GER)	54	60	36	—	43	60	60	60	32	405
2	Gabriela Koukalová (CZE)	60	15	34	54	54	48	34	31	54	384
3	Kaisa Mäkäräinen (FIN)	40	54	30	48	60	36	54	10	36	368
4	Marie Dorin Habert (FRA)	36	43	40	60	48	38	—	54	27	346
5	Dorothea Wierer (ITA)	48	22	54	34	36	31	23	4	34	286
6	Justine Braisaz (FRA)	28	36	19	DNS	29	40	20	30	48	250
7	Marte Olsbu (NOR)	—	32	23	36	32	25	32	18	38	236
8	Anaïs Chevalier (FRA)	7	2	60	32	34	30	29	32	—	226
9	Yuliia Dzhima (UKR)	32	30	28	26	0	18	36	15	30	215
10	Franziska Hildebrand (GER)	22	34	31	29	23	13	38	8	12	210
11	Susan Dunklee (USA)	19	40	43	0	17	19	40	27	4	209
12	Lisa Theresa Hauser (AUT)	38	38	13	—	9	15	0	38	40	191
13	Galina Vishnevskaya (KAZ)	24	28	21	31	30	—	10	19	28	191
14	Lisa Vittozzi (ITA)	0	19	27	DNS	31	27	0	48	25	177
15	Celia Aymonier (FRA)	21	24	24	20	4	32	14	34	—	173
16	Tiril Eckhoff (NOR)	14	9	32	—	10	11	43	26	23	168
17	Anaïs Bescond (FRA)	15	1	14	40	0	—	48	28	19	165
18	Maren Hammerschmidt (GER)	16	17	—	43	24	1	12	25	26	164
19	Darya Domracheva (BLR)	—	—	—	7	DNS	54	28	43	29	161
20	Selina Gasparin (SUI)	20	31	18	22	12	12	27	14	DNS	156
21	Eva Puskarčíková (CZE)	34	48	15	5	38	10	2	—	—	152
22	Veronika Vítková (CZE)	23	26	29	—	25	—	DNF	17	31	151
23	Tatiana Akimova (RUS)	9	21	48	9	28	23	0	—	10	148
24	Nadezhda Skardino (BLR)	31	25	0	—	14	22	30	23	2	147
25	Paulína Fialková (SVK)	17	—	0	—	—	29	31	40	24	141
26	Teja Gregorin (SLO)	2	11	8	18	20	6	—	21	43	129
27	Mari Laukkanen (FIN)	10	6	26	6	—	DNS	—	16	60	124
28	Vanessa Hinz (GER)	30	8	—	38	15	21	—	—	0	112
29	Anna Magnusson (SWE)	25	13	16	—	3	5	25	2	20	109
30	Lena Häcki (SUI)	43	0	—	28	—	0	—	11	21	103
#	Name	ÖST	POK	NOV	OBE	RUH	HOC	PYE	KON	OSL	Total
31	Irina Starykh (RUS)	—	—	—	—	—	43	21	22	14	100
32	Iryna Varvynets (UKR)	0	—	25	DNS	21	—	17	36	—	99
33	Federica Sanfilippo (ITA)	0	0	17	30	6	24	—	0	22	99
34	Franziska Preuß (GER)	27	—	38	—	27	—	—	—	—	92
35	Magdalena Gwizdoń (POL)	—	0	4	10	26	16	26	0	0	82
36	Alexia Runggaldier (ITA)	6	0	10	0	22	26	1	0	16	81
37	Iryna Kryuko (BLR)	26	23	3	0	2	0	15	—	—	69
38	Monika Hojnisz (POL)	0	27	20	11	DNS	0	7	0	0	65
39	Anastasiya Merkushyna (UKR)	—	—	0	2	18	34	3	1	5	63
40	Mona Brorsson (SWE)	0	—	—	0	5	0	19	29	9	62
41	Anastasiya Kuzmina (SVK)	—	10	—	—	11	28	—	6	—	55
42	Anna Frolina (KOR)	—	0	—	21	0	8	24	DNS	0	53
43	Nadine Horchler (GER)	—	—	—	24	—	9	0	20	—	53
44	Hanna Öberg (SWE)	—	—	11	—	40	0	—	—	0	51
45	Lucie Charvátová (CZE)	29	—	—	—	0	7	—	7	8	51
46	Rosanna Crawford (CAN)	—	0	9	19	DNS	0	22	—	—	50
47	Ekaterina Glazyrina (RUS)	0	29	—	13	7	—	—	—	—	49
48	Daria Virolaynen (RUS)	—	—	—	—	—	—	—	24	18	42
49	Baiba Bendika (LAT)	0	0	—	—	16	14	9	—	0	39
50	Irina Uslugina (RUS)	—	—	—	8	19	2	0	9	0	38
51	Fanny Horn Birkeland (NOR)	5	0	6	25	—	—	—	—	—	36
52	Olga Podchufarova (RUS)	0	12	12	12	DNS	—	—	—	—	36
53	Denise Herrmann (GER)	—	20	—	—	—	—	8	0	7	35
54	Emma Nilsson (SWE)	3	18	7	—	0	—	—	5	1	34
55	Miriam Gössner (GER)	0	16	0	17	0	—	—	—	—	33
56	Olena Pidhrushna (UKR)	18	14	0	DNF	DNS	DNS	—	—	—	32
57	Darya Usanova (KAZ)	—	4	—	16	—	0	0	12	—	32
58	Jana Gereková (SVK)	—	—	0	15	—	—	16	—	—	31
59	Julia Ransom (CAN)	0	7	22	—	0	—	0	0	0	29
60	Chardine Sloof (SWE)	—	—	—	27	—	0	—	0	—	27
#	Name	ÖST	POK	NOV	OBE	RUH	HOC	PYE	KON	OSL	Total
61	Kaia Wøien Nicolaisen (NOR)	—	—	0	LAP	—	20	—	—	6	26
62	Svetlana Sleptsova (RUS)	—	3	5	—	—	17	—	—	—	25
63	Tang Jialin (CHN)	—	—	—	23	—	0	0	—	—	23
64	Uliana Kaisheva (RUS)	—	—	—	14	8	—	—	—	—	22
65	Hilde Fenne (NOR)	—	5	—	4	—	0	0	13	—	22
66	Victoria Slivko (RUS)	—	—	—	—	—	—	—	3	17	20
67	Ivona Fialková (SVK)	—	0	—	—	—	—	18	0	0	18
68	Clare Egan (USA)	11	0	—	0	—	0	5	0	0	16
69	Enora Latuilliere (FRA)	—	—	—	—	—	—	—	—	15	15
70	Alina Raikova (KAZ)	—	—	0	LAP	—	—	13	0	—	13
71	Julia Schwaiger (AUT)	—	—	0	—	—	—	—	—	13	13
72	Christina Rieder (AUT)	13	—	—	—	—	—	—	0	—	13
73	Valj Semerenko (UKR)	—	—	—	—	13	—	DNS	—	—	13
74	Anastasia Zagoruiko (RUS)	12	—	0	—	—	—	—	—	—	12
75	Julia Simon (FRA)	—	—	—	—	1	—	—	—	11	12
76	Megan Tandy (CAN)	—	DNF	0	—	DNS	—	11	—	—	11
77	Iana Bondar (UKR)	8	—	DNS	—	—	—	—	—	—	8
78	Fuyuko Tachizaki (JPN)	1	0	1	0	0	—	6	—	—	8
79	Krystyna Guzik (POL)	4	—	2	1	—	0	—	0	—	7
81	Aita Gasparin (SUI)	—	—	0	—	—	0	4	—	0	4
80	Olga Poltoranina (KAZ)	0	—	0	—	—	4	—	—	—	4
82	Joanne Reid (USA)	0	—	0	—	—	3	0	0	—	3
83	Olga Abramova (UKR)	—	—	—	—	—	—	—	0	3	3
84	Elisabeth Högberg (SWE)	—	DNS	—	3	—	—	—	—	—	3
