= Biathlon at the 2017 Asian Winter Games =

- Venue: Nishioka Biathlon Stadium
- Dates: 23–26 February 2017
- Competitors: 51 from 8 nations

Biathlon at the 2017 Asian Winter Games was held in Sapporo, Japan between 23–26 February at Nishioka Biathlon Stadium.

== Schedule ==
F	Final

Event↓/Date →	23rd Thu	24th Fri	25th Sat	26th Sun
Men's 10 km sprint	F			
Men's 12.5 km pursuit		F		
Men's 15 km mass start				F
Women's 7.5 km sprint	F			
Women's 10 km pursuit		F		
Women's 12.5 km mass start				F
Mixed 2 × 6 + 2 × 7.5 km relay			F	

== Medalists ==
=== Men ===
Event	Gold	Silver	Bronze
10 km sprint	Yan Savitskiy; Kazakhstan	Vassiliy Podkorytov; Kazakhstan	Mikito Tachizaki; Japan
12.5 km pursuit	Mikito Tachizaki; Japan	Yan Savitskiy; Kazakhstan	Kim Yong-gyu; South Korea
15 km mass start	Yan Savitskiy; Kazakhstan	Wang Wenqiang; China	Kosuke Ozaki; Japan

=== Women ===
Event	Gold	Silver	Bronze
7.5 km sprint	Galina Vishnevskaya; Kazakhstan	Zhang Yan; China	Alina Raikova; Kazakhstan
10 km pursuit	Galina Vishnevskaya; Kazakhstan	Zhang Yan; China	Darya Usanova; Kazakhstan
12.5 km mass start	Galina Vishnevskaya; Kazakhstan	Alina Raikova; Kazakhstan	Fuyuko Tachizaki; Japan

=== Mixed ===
Event	Gold	Silver	Bronze
2 × 6 + 2 × 7.5 km relay	Kazakhstan; Galina Vishnevskaya; Darya Usanova; Maxim Braun; Yan Savitskiy	Kazakhstan; Alina Raikova; Anna Kistanova; Vassiliy Podkorytov; Anton Pantov	Japan; Fuyuko Tachizaki; Yurie Tanaka; Mikito Tachizaki; Tsukasa Kobonoki

== Medal table ==
Rank	Nation	Gold	Silver	Bronze	Total
1	Kazakhstan (KAZ)	6	4	2	12
2	Japan (JPN)	1	0	4	5
3	China (CHN)	0	3	0	3
4	South Korea (KOR)	0	0	1	1
Totals (4 entries)		7	7	7	21

== Participating nations ==
A total of 51 athletes from 8 nations competed in biathlon at the 2017 Asian Winter Games:

- Australia (4)
- China (9)
- Chinese Taipei (1)
- Japan (12)
- Kazakhstan (8)
- Kyrgyzstan (4)
- Mongolia (5)
- South Korea (8)

* Australia as guest nation, was ineligible to win any medals.
