= Biathlon at the 2017 Asian Winter Games – Mixed relay =

Asian Winter Games event

Mixed 2 × 6 + 2 × 7.5 kilometre relay at the 2017 Asian Winter Games
- Venue: Nishioka Biathlon Stadium
- Dates: 25 February 2017
- Competitors: 44 from 7 nations

Medalists
| gold medal | Kazakhstan; Galina Vishnevskaya, Darya Usanova, Maxim Braun, Yan Savitskiy |
| silver medal | Kazakhstan; Alina Raikova, Anna Kistanova, Vassiliy Podkorytov, Anton Pantov |
| bronze medal | Japan; Fuyuko Tachizaki, Yurie Tanaka, Mikito Tachizaki, Tsukasa Kobonoki |

The mixed 2×6 kilometre + 2×7.5 kilometre relay at the 2017 Asian Winter Games was held on February 25, 2017 at the Nishioka Biathlon Stadium.

== Schedule ==
All times are Japan Standard Time (UTC+09:00)

| Date | Time | Event |
|---|---|---|
| Saturday, 25 February 2017 | 10:00 | Final |

== Results ==
Legend

- DNF — Did not finish
- DSQ — Disqualified

| Rank | Team | Penalties | | | Time |
| Rank | Team | P | S | Total | Time |
|---|---|---|---|---|---|
| 1st place, gold medalist(s) | Kazakhstan (KAZ) | 1+5 | 0+7 | 1+12 | 1:15:40.3 |
| | Galina Vishnevskaya | 0+0 | 0+2 | 0+2 | 17:50.3 |
| | Darya Usanova | 0+2 | 0+1 | 0+3 | 18:23.9 |
| | Maxim Braun | 0+0 | 0+2 | 0+2 | 19:32.0 |
| | Yan Savitskiy | 1+3 | 0+2 | 1+5 | 19:54.1 |
| 2nd place, silver medalist(s) | Kazakhstan (KAZ) | 0+3 | 0+6 | 0+9 | 1:15:54.5 |
| | Alina Raikova | 0+0 | 0+1 | 0+1 | 18:04.1 |
| | Anna Kistanova | 0+2 | 0+3 | 0+5 | 19:14.3 |
| | Vassiliy Podkorytov | 0+0 | 0+1 | 0+1 | 19:03.3 |
| | Anton Pantov | 0+1 | 0+1 | 0+2 | 19:32.8 |
| 3rd place, bronze medalist(s) | Japan (JPN) | 1+6 | 0+7 | 1+13 | 1:18:25.1 |
| | Fuyuko Tachizaki | 0+1 | 0+0 | 0+1 | 18:11.9 |
| | Yurie Tanaka | 0+2 | 0+3 | 0+5 | 20:23.5 |
| | Mikito Tachizaki | 0+0 | 0+3 | 0+3 | 19:40.2 |
| | Tsukasa Kobonoki | 1+3 | 0+1 | 1+4 | 20:09.5 |
| 4 | China (CHN) | 1+5 | 1+9 | 2+14 | 1:20:19.9 |
| | Tang Jialin | 0+0 | 0+1 | 0+1 | 18:14.8 |
| | Zhang Yan | 0+1 | 0+2 | 0+3 | 19:06.3 |
| | Tang Jinle | 1+3 | 1+3 | 2+6 | 21:45.5 |
| | Wang Wenqiang | 0+1 | 0+3 | 0+4 | 21:13.3 |
| 5 | South Korea (KOR) | 2+6 | 2+5 | 4+11 | 1:22:56.4 |
| | Mun Ji-hee | 0+0 | 0+0 | 0+0 | 18:40.1 |
| | Park Ji-ae | 0+0 | 2+3 | 2+3 | 21:01.9 |
| | Kim Yong-gyu | 0+3 | 0+1 | 0+4 | 20:38.3 |
| | Kim Jong-min | 2+3 | 0+1 | 2+4 | 22:36.1 |
| 6 | Japan (JPN) | 2+7 | 0+8 | 2+15 | 1:23:22.1 |
| | Asuka Hachisuka | 0+0 | 0+2 | 0+2 | 19:44.8 |
| | Kirari Tanaka | 2+3 | 0+2 | 2+5 | 22:26.4 |
| | Takuto Terabayashi | 0+2 | 0+2 | 0+4 | 20:15.6 |
| | Yuki Nakajima | 0+2 | 0+2 | 0+4 | 20:55.3 |
| 7 | South Korea (KOR) | 0+6 | 1+5 | 1+11 | 1:24:04.7 |
| | Jung Ju-mi | 0+0 | 0+1 | 0+1 | 19:45.9 |
| | Ko Eun-jung | 0+3 | 0+1 | 0+4 | 20:43.4 |
| | Lee In-bok | 0+0 | 0+0 | 0+0 | 21:24.3 |
| | Heo Seon-hoe | 0+3 | 1+3 | 1+6 | 22:11.1 |
| 8 | Australia (AUS) | | | | Lapped |
| | Darcie Morton | 1+3 | 0+1 | 1+4 | 22:00.4 |
| | Jillian Colebourn | 0+1 | 0+1 | 0+2 | 21:35.9 |
| | Damon Morton | 0+1 | 0+0 | 0+1 | 20:54.5 |
| | Jeremy Flanagan | | | | |
| 9 | Mongolia (MGL) | | | | Lapped |
| | Otgondavaagiin Uranbaigali | 0+0 | 1+3 | 1+3 | 23:09.7 |
| | Enkhbayaryn Ariunzul | 2+3 | 2+3 | 4+6 | 25:42.6 |
| | Battüvshingiin Bat-Erdene | 0+3 | 1+3 | 1+6 | 24:34.2 |
| | Erdenechimegiin Barkhüü | | | | |
| — | Kyrgyzstan (KGZ) | | | | DNF |
| | Kunduz Abdykadyrova | 0+2 | 3+3 | 3+5 | 28:27.9 |
| | Natalia Levdanskaia | 1+3 | 0+2 | 1+5 | 26:13.9 |
| | Nurbek Doolatov | | | | |
| | Tariel Zharkymbaev | | | | |
| — | China (CHN) | | | | DSQ |
| | Meng Fanqi | 0+1 | 0+1 | 0+2 | 19:36.2 |
| | Wu Aiting | 0+0 | 0+2 | 0+2 | 21:36.6 |
| | Hu Weiyao | 0+1 | 0+3 | 0+4 | 22:58.1 |
| | Kao Pengyu | | | | |
