= Zhang Yan (biathlete) =

Chinese biathlete (born 1992)

Personal information
- Nationality: Chinese
- Born: 10 May 1992 (age 34)

Sport
- Country: China
- Sport: Biathlon
Medal record
Women's biathlon
Representing China
Youth World Championships
Gold medal – first place	2009 Canmore	10 km individual
Gold medal – first place	2009 Canmore	6 km sprint
Asian Winter Games
Silver medal – second place	2017 Sapporo	7.5 km sprint
Silver medal – second place	2017 Sapporo	10 km pursuit

Zhang Yan
- Simplified Chinese: 张岩
- Traditional Chinese: 張岩
Transcriptions
Standard Mandarin
- Hanyu Pinyin: Zhāng Yán
- IPA: [ʈʂáŋ jɛ̌n]

Zhang Yan (Chinese: 张岩; pinyin: Zhāng Yán; Mandarin pronunciation: [ʈʂáŋ jɛ̌n]; born 10 May 1992) is a Chinese biathlete. She competed at the Biathlon World Championships 2012 and 2013. She competed at the 2014 Winter Olympics in Sochi, in sprint, pursuit, individual and relay.

== Biathlon results ==
All results are sourced from the International Biathlon Union.

=== Olympic Games ===
0 medals

Event	Individual	Sprint	Pursuit	Mass start	Relay	Mixed relay
(Russia) 2014 Sochi	46th	49th	53rd	—	14th	—
(South Korea) 2018 Pyeongchang	59th	38th	45th	—	—	—

=== World Championships ===
0 medals

Event	Individual	Sprint	Pursuit	Mass start	Relay	Mixed relay	Single mixed relay
(Germany) 2012 Ruhpolding	78th	91st	—	—	25th	—	—
(Czech Republic) 2013 Nové Město	16th	32nd	24th	25th	16th	—	—
(Finland) 2015 Kontiolahti	42nd	62nd	—	—	17th	22nd	—
(Norway) 2016 Oslo	47th	45th	59th	—	22nd	—	—
(Austria) 2017 Hochfilzen	19th	69th	—	—	—	—	—
(Sweden) 2019 Östersund	27th	37th	31st	—	17th	18th	—
(Italy) 2020 Rasen-Antholz	72nd	—	—	—	—	18th	—

*During Olympic seasons competitions are only held for those events not included in the Olympic program.
**The single mixed relay was added as an event in 2019.
