= Maren Hammerschmidt =

German biathlete (born 1989)

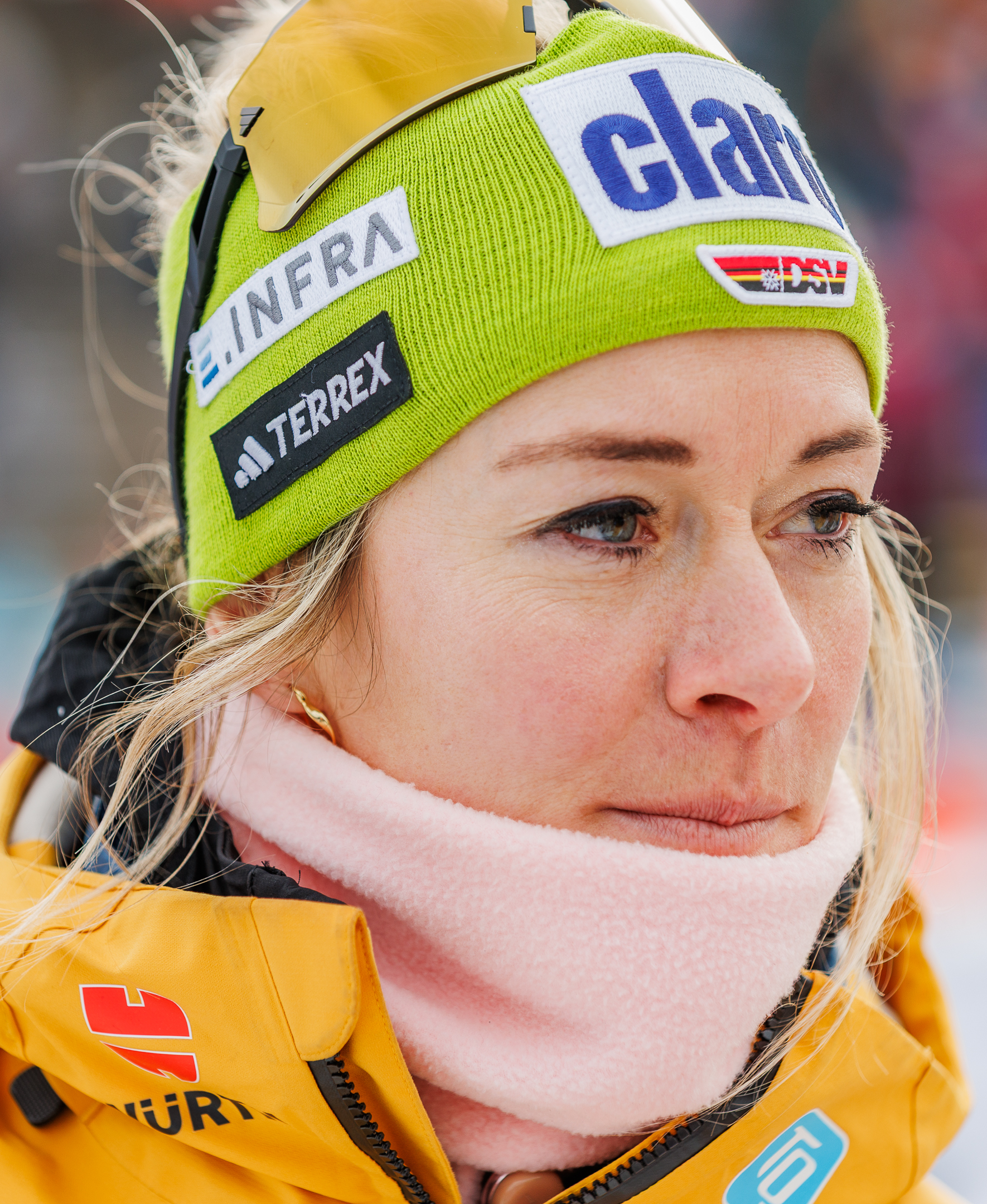
- Hammerschmidt in 2025

Personal information
- Nationality: German
- Born: 24 October 1989 (age 36) Frankenberg, West Germany

Sport

Professional information
- Sport: Biathlon
- Club: SC Winterberg
- World Cup debut: 2011

Olympic Games
- Teams: 1 (2018)
- Medals: 0 (0 gold)

World Championships
- Teams: 3 (2016, 20172021)
- Medals: 2 (1 gold)

World Cup
- Seasons: 7 (2011/12–)
- Individual victories: 0
- All victories: 6
- Individual podiums: 2
- All podiums: 17
- Overall titles: 0
- Discipline titles: 0
Medal record
World Championships
| Gold medal – first place | 2017 Hochfilzen | 4 × 6 km relay |
| Bronze medal – third place | 2016 Oslo | 4 × 6 km relay |
Junior World Championships
| Gold medal – first place | 2010 Torsby | 7.5 km sprint |
| Bronze medal – third place | 2010 Torsby | 3 × 6 km relay |
Youth World Championships
| Gold medal – first place | 2008 Ruhpolding | 6 km sprint |
| Gold medal – first place | 2008 Ruhpolding | 3 × 6 km relay |
European Championships
| Bronze medal – third place | 2012 Osrblie | 4 × 6 km relay |
| Silver medal – second place | 2014 Nové Město | 4 × 6 km relay |
| Silver medal – second place | 2015 Otepää | 4 × 6 km relay |

Maren Hammerschmidt (born 24 October 1989) is a former German biathlete. She has won a bronze and a gold medal with the German Women's Relay team at the Biathlon World Championships 2016 and 2017.

== Record ==
=== Olympic Games ===
| Event | Individual | Sprint | Pursuit | Mass start | Relay | Mixed relay |
|---|---|---|---|---|---|---|
| (South Korea) 2018 Pyeongchang | 17th | — | — | — | — | — |

=== World Championships ===
| Event | Individual | Sprint | Pursuit | Mass Start | Relay | Mixed Relay |
|---|---|---|---|---|---|---|
| (Norway) 2016 Oslo | 27th | — | — | — | Bronze | — |
| (Austria) 2017 Hochfilzen | 7th | 55th | 40th | — | Gold | — |
| (Slovenia) 2021 Pokljuka | 34th | — | — | — | — | — |

=== World Cup ===
| Season | Overall | | | Individual | | | Sprint | | | Pursuit | | | Mass start | | |
| Season | Races | Points | Position | Races | Points | Position | Races | Points | Position | Races | Points | Position | Races | Points | Position |
|---|---|---|---|---|---|---|---|---|---|---|---|---|---|---|---|
| 2011–12 | 2/26 | 22 | 72nd | 0/3 | – | – | 1/10 | 7 | 73rd | 1/8 | 15 | 62nd | 0/5 | – | – |
| 2012–13 | 5/26 | 12 | 85th | 1/2 | 0 | – | 2/9 | 5 | 85th | 2/8 | 7 | 75th | 0/3 | – | – |
| 2013–14 | no World Cup races | | | | | | | | | | | | | | |
| 2014–15 | no World Cup races | | | | | | | | | | | | | | |
| 2015–16 | 16/25 | 323 | 25th | 3/3 | 33 | 29th | 5/9 | 107 | 27th | 5/8 | 112 | 23rd | 3/5 | 71 | 24th |
| 2016–17 | 22/26 | 426 | 22nd | 3/3 | 76 | 6th | 8/9 | 122 | 24th | 8/9 | 164 | 18th | 3/5 | 64 | 25th |
| 2017–18 | | 421 | 16th | 2/2 | 32 | 23rd | | 119 | 18th | | 128 | 16th | | 142 | 9th |
| 2018–19 | | | | – | – | – | | | | | | | | | |
| 2019–20 | | 13 | 79th | – | – | – | – | – | – | | 13 | 60th | – | – | – |

=== Relay victories ===
| No. | Season | Date | Location | Discipline | Level |
|---|---|---|---|---|---|
| 1 | 2016–17 | 11 December 2016 | Pokljuka, Slovenia | Relay | Biathlon World Cup |
| 2 | 2016–17 | 12, January 2017 | Ruhpolding, Germany | Relay | Biathlon World Cup |
| 3 | 2016–17 | 22 January 2017 | Antholz, Italy | Relay | Biathlon World Cup |
| 4 | 2016–17 | 17 February 2017 | Hochfilzen, Austria | Relay | World Championships |
| 5 | 2016–17 | 5 March 2017 | Pyeongchang, South Korea | Relay | Biathlon World Cup |
| 6 | 2017–18 | 10 December 2017 | Hochfilzen, Austria | Relay | Biathlon World Cup |
