= Anja Eržen =

Slovenian cross-country skier

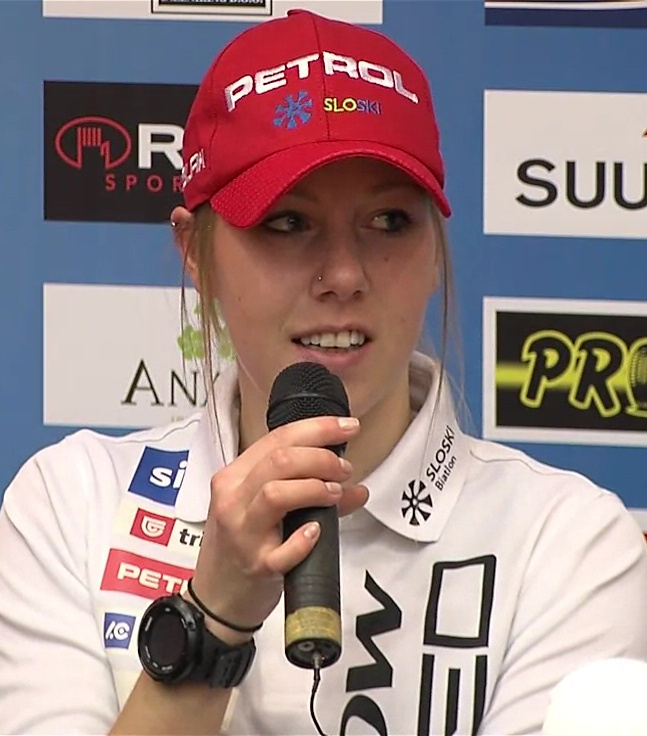
- Anja Eržen in 2015

Personal information
- Nationality: Slovenia
- Born: 26 October 1992 (age 33) Ribno, Slovenia

Sport
- Sport: Skiing
- Club: TSK Bled

World Cup career
- Seasons: 2 – (2010, 2012)
- Indiv. starts: 3
- Indiv. podiums: 0
- Team starts: 3
- Team podiums: 0
- Overall titles: 0
- Discipline titles: 0
Medal record
Women's cross-country skiing
Representing Slovenia
Junior World Championships
Bronze medal – third place	2012 Erzurum	4 × 3.33 km relay
- Updated on 26 May 2019

Anja Eržen (born 26 October 1992) is a retired Slovenian cross-country skier who has been competing since 2006. At the 2010 Winter Olympics in Vancouver, she finished 15th in the 4 × 5 km relay and 60th in the 7.5 km + 7.5 km double pursuit events.

Eržen has only two World Cup competitions as of March 2010 with a ninth-place finish in the 4 × 5 km relay in Norway in November 2009 and a 56th-place finish in a 15 km mass start event in December 2009. She has three victories at lesser events at 5 km in 2009 and 2010.

== Cross-country skiing results ==
All results are sourced from the International Ski Federation (FIS).

=== Olympic Games ===
Year	Age	10 km individual	15 km skiathlon	30 km mass start	Sprint	4 × 5 km relay	Team sprint
2010	17	—	60	—	—	14	—

=== World Championships ===
Year	Age	10 km individual	15 km skiathlon	30 km mass start	Sprint	4 × 5 km relay	Team sprint
2011	18	44	—	—	—	7	—

=== World Cup ===
==== Season standings ====
Season	Age	Discipline standings			Ski Tour standings		
Season	Age	Overall	Distance	Sprint	Nordic Opening	Tour de Ski	World Cup Final
2010	17	NC	NC	—	—N/a	—	—
2012	19	NC	NC	NC	—	—	—
