= Yurie Tanaka =

Japanese biathlete (born 1989)

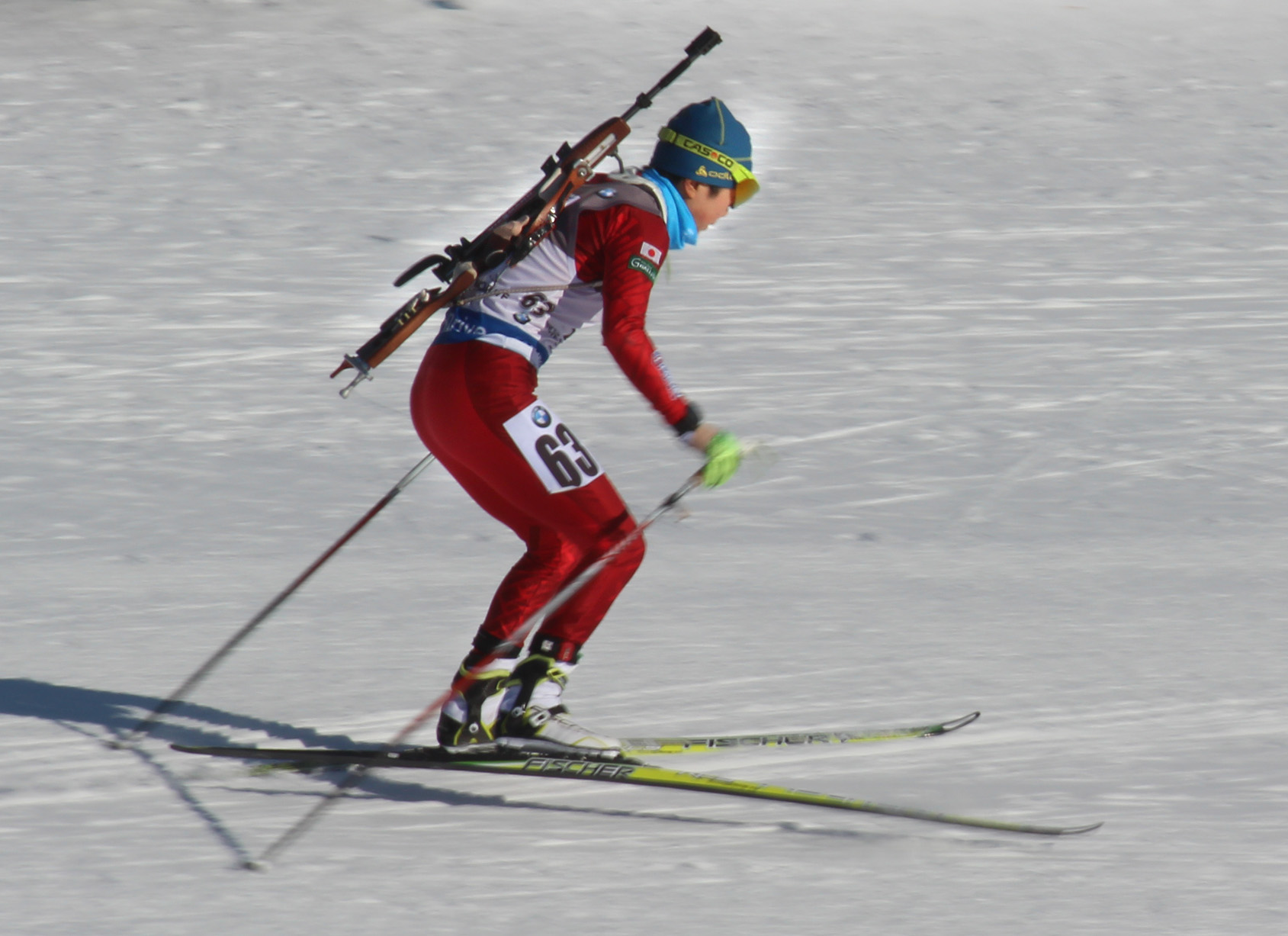
- Tanaka in 2015

Personal information
- Nationality: Japanese
- Born: 6 January 1989 (age 37) Niigata, Japan
- Education: Nihon University
- Height: 159 cm (5 ft 3 in) (2025)
- Weight: 50 kg (110 lb) (2025)

Sport
- Country: Japan
- Sport: Biathlon, Ski mountaineering
Medal record
Women's biathlon
Representing Kazakhstan
Asian Winter Games
Bronze medal – third place	2017 Sapporo	Mixed relay

Yurie Tanaka (田中 友理恵, Tanaka Yurie; born 6 January 1989) is a Japanese biathlete and ski mountaineer. She competed in the 2014/15 World Cup season, and represented Japan at the Biathlon World Championships 2015 in Kontiolahti. She has represented Japan at both the 2018 PyeongChang Olympics and the 2022 Beijing Olympics. At the 2025 Asian Winter Games in Harbin, she will compete in ski mountaineering.

== Career results ==
=== Olympic Games ===
0 medals

Event	Individual	Sprint	Pursuit	Mass start	Relay	Mixed relay
(South Korea) 2018 Pyeongchang	80th	68th	—	—	17th	—
(China) 2022 Beijing	71st	74th	—	—	17th	—

=== World Championships ===
0 medals

Event	Individual	Sprint	Pursuit	Mass start	Relay	Mixed relay	Single mixed relay
(Sweden) 2019 Östersund	66th	—	—	—	19th	—	—
(Italy) 2020 Antholz	90th	79th	—	—	21st	—	—
(Slovenia) 2021 Pokljuka	74th	78th	—	—	15th	—	—
