= Anna Kistanova =

Kazakhstani biathlete (born 1990)

Personal information
- Born: 26 August 1990 (age 35)
Medal record
Women's biathlon
Representing Kazakhstan
Asian Winter Games
| Silver medal – second place | 2017 Sapporo | Mixed relay |

Anna Kistanova (born 26 August 1990) is a Kazakhstani biathlete. She competed in the 2014/15 World Cup season, and represented Kazakhstan at the Biathlon World Championships 2015 in Kontiolahti.
