= Galina Vishnevskaya-Sheporenko =

Kazakhstani biathlete (born 1994)

Galina Vishnevskaya
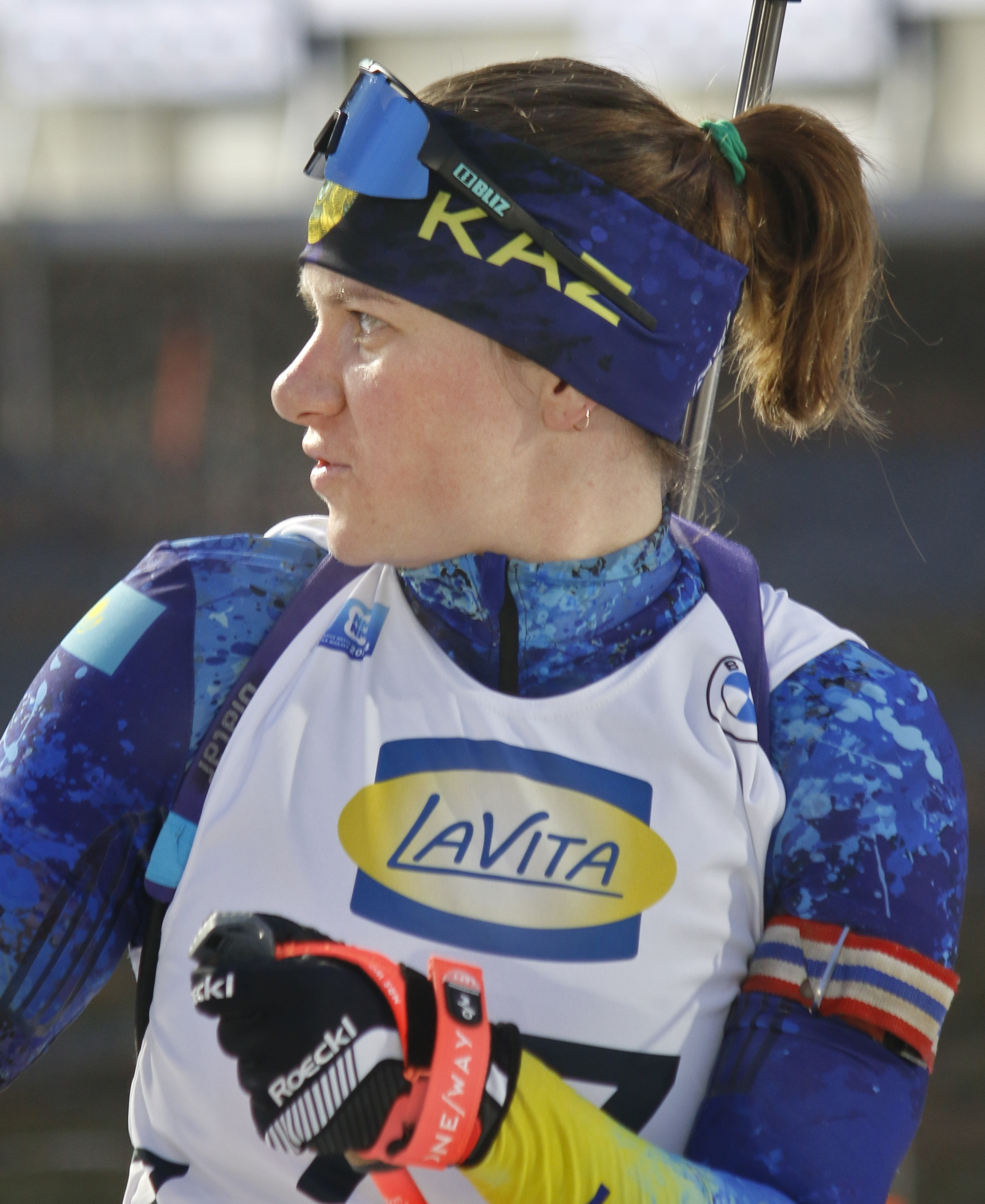

Personal information
- Full name: Galina Vishnevskaya-Sheporenko
- Born: 10 February 1994 (age 32) Semey, Kazakhstan

Sport
- Sport: Skiing
Medal record
Women's biathlon
Representing Kazakhstan
Winter Universiade
Gold medal – first place	2017 Almaty	Sprint
Gold medal – first place	2017 Almaty	Mass start
Silver medal – second place	2015 Osrblie	Mixed relay
Silver medal – second place	2017 Almaty	Individual
Silver medal – second place	2017 Almaty	Mixed relay
Winter Youth Olympics
Silver medal – second place	2012 Innsbruck	Sprint
Bronze medal – third place	2012 Innsbruck	Pursuit
Junior World Championships
Gold medal – first place	2014 Presque Isle	10 km pursuit
Silver medal – second place	2014 Presque Isle	7.5 km sprint
Silver medal – second place	2015 Raubichi	7.5 km sprint
Silver medal – second place	2015 Raubichi	10 km pursuit
Bronze medal – third place	2015 Raubichi	12.5 km individual
Youth World Championships
Silver medal – second place	2012 Kontiolahti	10 km individual
Silver medal – second place	2013 Obertilliach	7.5 km pursuit
Bronze medal – third place	2011 Nové Město	10 km individual
Asian Winter Games
Gold medal – first place	2017 Sapporo	7.5 km sprint
Gold medal – first place	2017 Sapporo	10 km pursuit
Gold medal – first place	2017 Sapporo	12.5 km mass start
Gold medal – first place	2017 Sapporo	Mixed relay

Galina Sergeyevna Vishnevskaya-Sheporenko (Russian: Галина Сергеевна Вишневская-Шепоренко, born 10 February 1994) is a Kazakhstani biathlete. She competed at the 2014 Winter Olympics in Sochi, in the women's individual and sprint competitions.

== Olympic Games ==
0 medals

Event	Individual	Sprint	Pursuit	Mass start	Relay	Mixed relay
(Russia) 2014 Sochi	41st	64th	—	—	11th	—
(South Korea) 2018 Pyeongchang	45th	30th	20th	—	14th	18th
(China) 2022 Beijing	44th	52nd	52nd	—	—	—

== World Championships ==
0 medals

Event	Individual	Sprint	Pursuit	Mass start	Relay	Mixed relay	Single mixed relay
(Norway) 2016 Oslo	24th	24th	25th	22nd	8th	15th	
(Austria) 2017 Hochfilzen	21st	86th	—	—	12th	—	
(Sweden) 2019 Östersund	44th	68th	—	—	18th	—	18th
(Italy) 2020 Rasen-Antholz	9th	66th	—	—	18th	22nd	22nd
(Slovenia) 2021 Pokljuka	25th	73rd	—	—	20th	27th	17th
(Czech Republic) 2024 Nové Město na Moravě	24th	43rd	53rd	—	18th	21st	23rd
(Switzerland) 2025 Lenzerheide	86th	86th	—	—	22nd	23rd	—

*During Olympic seasons competitions are only held for those events not included in the Olympic program.
**The single mixed relay was added as an event in 2019.
