= Ko Eun-jung =

South Korean biathlete (born 1996)

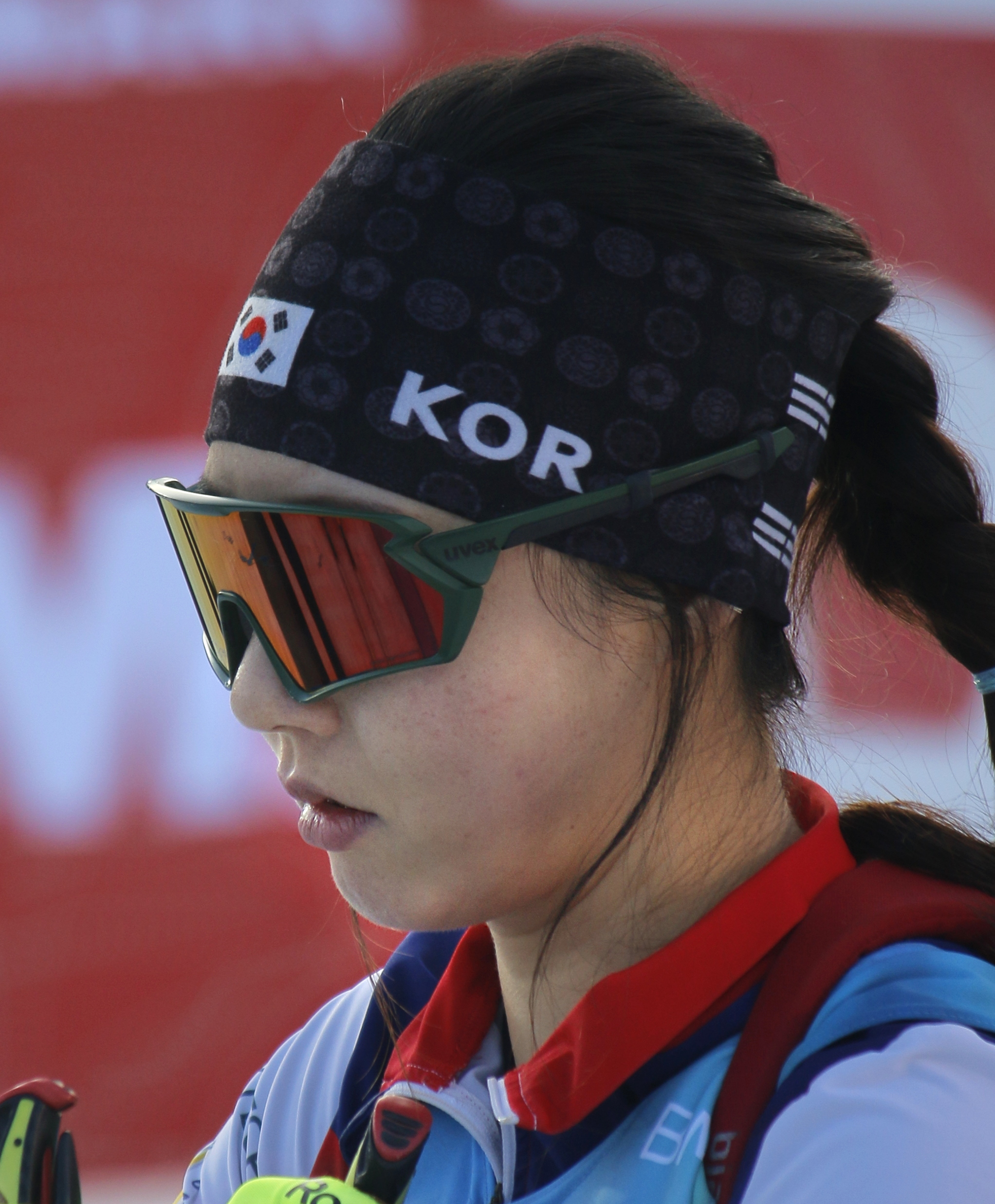
- Ko Eun-jung in 2023

Personal information
- Nationality: South Korean
- Born: 5 June 1996 (age 28)

Sport
- Country: South Korea
- Sport: Biathlon

Ko Eun-jung (born 5 June 1996) is a South Korean biathlete. She has competed in the Biathlon World Cup, and represented South Korea at the Biathlon World Championships 2016.

== Biathlon results ==
All results are sourced from the International Biathlon Union.

=== Olympic Games ===
0 medals

Event	Individual	Sprint	Pursuit	Mass start	Relay	Mixed relay
(South Korea) 2018 Pyeongchang	—	78th	—	—	18th	—

=== World Championships ===
0 medals

Event	Individual	Sprint	Pursuit	Mass start	Relay	Mixed relay	Single mixed relay
(Finland) 2015 Kontiolahti	—	100	—	—	24th	26th	—
(Norway) 2016 Oslo	—	92nd	—	—	23rd	24th	—
(Austria) 2017 Hochfilzen	—	—	—	—	18th	—	—
(Sweden) 2019 Östersund	77th	89th	—	—	21st	20th	—
(Italy) 2020 Rasen-Antholz	—	89th	—	—	22nd	—	—
(Germany) 2023 Oberhof	64th	90th	—	—	—	21st	—
(Czech Republic) 2024 Nové Město na Moravě	79th	92nd	—	—	19th	25th	—

*During Olympic seasons competitions are only held for those events not included in the Olympic program.
**The single mixed relay was added as an event in 2019.
