= Sari Furuya =

Japanese biathlete (born 1990)

Sari Maeda
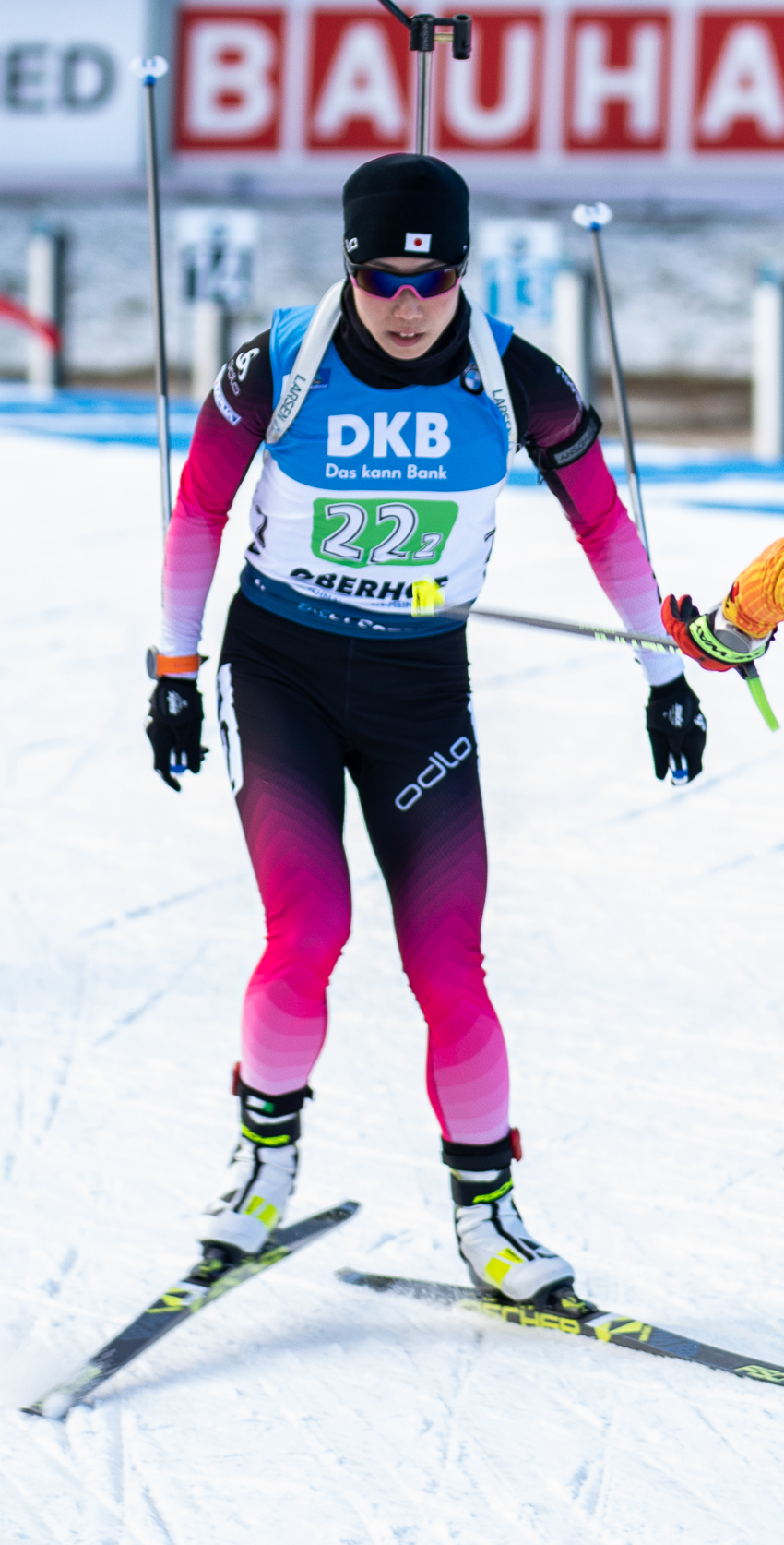
- Furuya in 2020

Personal information
- Birth name: Sari Furuya
- Nationality: Japanese
- Born: 25 May 1990 (age 34); Kutchan, Hokkaido, Japan
- Education: Waseda University
- Height: 165 cm (5 ft 5 in)
- Weight: 55 kg (121 lb)
- Spouse: Ryo Maeda (m. 2018)

Sport
- Country: Japan
- Sport: Biathlon

Sari Maeda (Japanese: 前田沙理, born Sari Furuya, 古谷沙理, on 25 May 1990) is a Japanese biathlete. She competed in the 2018 Winter Olympics.

== Career results ==
=== Olympic Games ===
0 medals

Event	Individual	Sprint	Pursuit	Mass start	Relay	Mixed relay
(South Korea) 2018 Pyeongchang	85th	49th	54th	—	17th	—
(China) 2022 Beijing	74th	67th	—	—	17th	18th

=== World Championships ===
0 medals

Event	Individual	Sprint	Pursuit	Mass start	Relay	Mixed relay	Single mixed relay
(Austria) 2017 Hochfilzen	68th	59th	58th	—	20th	15th	—
(Sweden) 2019 Östersund	84th	14th	30th	—	19th	15th	—
(Italy) 2020 Antholz	56th	55th	52nd	—	21st	20th	—
(Slovenia) 2021 Pokljuka	47th	70th	—	—	15th	20th	—
