= Tang Jialin =

Chinese biathlete (born 1991)

Personal information
- Born: 5 November 1991 (age 34)

Sport
- Country: China
- Sport: Women's Biathlon
Medal record
Women's biathlon
Representing China
Asian Games
Silver medal – second place	2011 Astana-Almaty	4×6 km relay
Bronze medal – third place	2025 Harbin	Sprint

Tang Jialin (Chinese: 唐佳琳; pinyin: Táng Jiālín; Mandarin pronunciation: [tʰǎŋ tɕjá lǐn]; born 5 November 1991) is a Chinese biathlete. She competed at the Biathlon World Championships 2011, 2012 and 2013. She competed at the 2014 Winter Olympics in Sochi, in sprint, pursuit and individual.

== Biathlon results ==
All results are sourced from the International Biathlon Union.

=== Olympic Games ===
0 medals

Event	Individual	Sprint	Pursuit	Mass start	Relay	Mixed relay
(Russia) 2014 Sochi	57th	55th	50th	—	15th	—
(South Korea) 2018 Pyeongchang	66th	70th	—	—	—	—
(China) 2022 Beijing	59th	35th	53rd	—	12th	—

=== World Championships ===
0 medals

Event	Individual	Sprint	Pursuit	Mass start	Relay	Mixed relay	Single mixed relay
(Austria) 2017 Hochfilzen	69th	52nd	44th	—	—	—	—
(Sweden) 2019 Östersund	40th	41st	52nd	—	17th	—	22nd
(Italy) 2020 Rasen-Antholz	38th	71st	—	—	16th	—	21st

*During Olympic seasons competitions are only held for those events not included in the Olympic program.
**The single mixed relay was added as an event in 2019.
