= Alina Raikova =

Kazakhstani biathlete (born 1991)

Personal information
- Born: 14 August 1991 (age 34) Shchuchinsk, Kokchetav Oblast, Kazakh SSR, Soviet Union
- Height: 168 cm (5 ft 6 in)

Sport
- Sport: Skiing
Medal record
Women's biathlon
Representing Kazakhstan
Winter Universiade
| Gold medal – first place | 2015 Osrblie | 15 km individual |
Asian Winter Games
| Silver medal – second place | 2017 Sapporo | 12.5 km mass start |
| Silver medal – second place | 2017 Sapporo | Mixed relay |
| Bronze medal – third place | 2017 Sapporo | 7.5 km sprint |

Alina Sergeyevna Kolomiyets (née Raikova; Russian: Алина Сергеевна Коломиец; born 14 August 1991) is a Kazakh biathlete. She competed at the Biathlon World Championships 2013, and at the 2014 Winter Olympics in Sochi, in the 15 km individual competition.

== Biathlon results ==
All results are sourced from the International Biathlon Union.

=== Olympic Games ===
0 medals

| Event | Individual | Sprint | Pursuit | Mass start | Relay | Mixed relay |
|---|---|---|---|---|---|---|
| (Russia) 2014 Sochi | 65th | — | — | — | — | — |
| (South Korea) 2018 Pyeongchang | 47th | 71st | — | — | 14th | 18th |

=== World Championships ===
0 medals

| Event | Individual | Sprint | Pursuit | Mass start | Relay | Mixed relay | Single mixed relay |
|---|---|---|---|---|---|---|---|
| (Czech Republic) 2013 Nové Město | 46th | 79th | — | — | 14th | — | — |
| (Finland) 2015 Kontiolahti | 40th | 93rd | — | — | 13th | — | — |
| (Norway) 2016 Oslo | 72nd | — | — | | 8th | 15th | — |
| (Austria) 2017 Hochfilzen | 29th | — | — | — | 12th | — | — |
| (Italy) 2020 Rasen-Antholz | — | — | — | — | 18th | — | — |

*During Olympic seasons competitions are only held for those events not included in the Olympic program.
**The single mixed relay was added as an event in 2019.
