= Mun Ji-hee =

South Korean biathlete (born 1988)

Personal information
- Born: August 2, 1988 (age 37) Muju, North Jeolla Province, South Korea

Sport
- Sport: Skiing
- Updated on February 28, 2013

- Mun Ji-hee
- Hangul: 문지희
- Hanja: 文志喜
- RR: Mun Jihui
- MR: Mun Chihŭi

Mun Ji-hee (Korean: 문지희; born August 2, 1988) is a South Korean biathlete.

Mun competed in the 2010 Winter Olympics for South Korea. Her best performance was 63rd in the sprint. She also finished 73rd in the individual.

As of February 2013, her best performance at the Biathlon World Championships is 17th, as part of the 2009 South Korean women's relay team. Her best individual performance is 65th, in the 2009 sprint.

As of February 2013, Mun's best performance in a Biathlon World Cup event is 14th, as part of the mixed relay team and the women's relay team. Her best individual result is 37th, in the sprint at Pyeongchang in 2007/08. Her best overall finish in the Biathlon World Cup is 101st, in 2009/10.

== Biathlon results ==
All results are sourced from the International Biathlon Union.

=== Olympic Games ===
0 medals

| Event | Individual | Sprint | Pursuit | Mass start | Relay | Mixed relay |
|---|---|---|---|---|---|---|
| (Canada) 2010 Vancouver | 72nd | 62nd | — | — | — | — |
| (Russia) 2014 Sochi | 69th | 74th | — | — | — | — |
| (South Korea) 2018 Pyeongchang | 78th | 82nd | — | — | 18th | — |

:*The mixed relay was added as an event in 2014.

=== World Championships ===
0 medals

| Event | Individual | Sprint | Pursuit | Mass start | Relay | Mixed relay | Single mixed relay |
|---|---|---|---|---|---|---|---|
| (Sweden) 2008 Östersund | — | 73rd | — | — | — | 19th | |
| (South Korea) 2009 Pyeongchang | 94th | 65th | — | — | 17th | 19th | |
| (Russia) 2011 Khanty-Mansiysk | 75th | 73rd | — | — | 18th | 25th | |
| (Germany) 2012 Ruhpolding | DNS | DNS | — | — | 24th | DNF | |
| (Finland) 2015 Kontiolahti | 76th | 54th | 50th | — | 24th | 26th | |
| (Norway) 2016 Oslo | 70th | 88th | — | — | 23rd | 24th | |
| (Austria) 2017 Hochfilzen | 94th | 73rd | — | — | 18th | — | |
| (Slovenia) 2021 Pokljuka | 92nd | — | — | — | 23rd | — | — |

*During Olympic seasons competitions are only held for those events not included in the Olympic program.
**The single mixed relay was added as an event in 2019.
