= Fuyuko Tachizaki =

Japanese biathlete (born 1989)

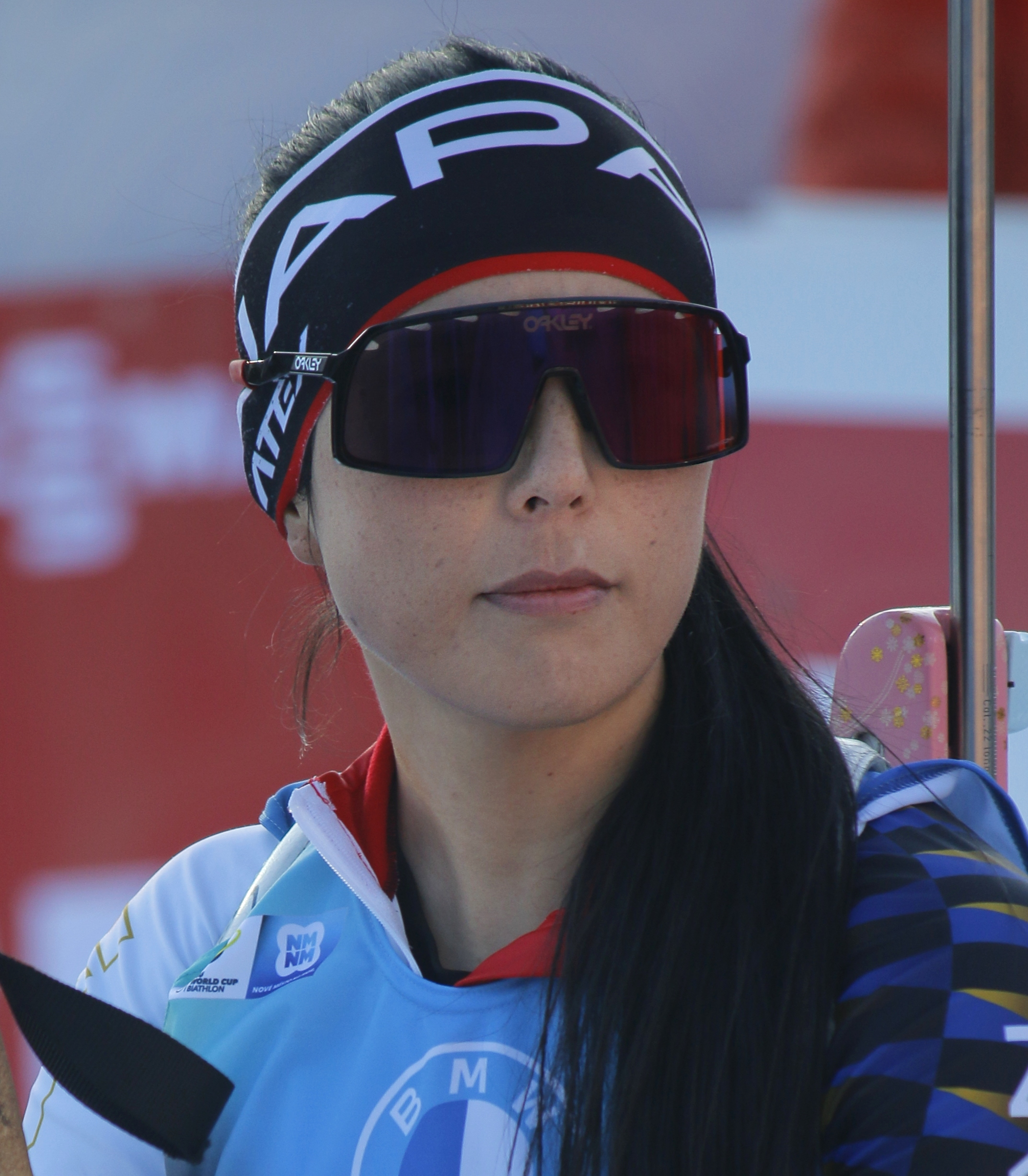

Personal information
- Born: January 13, 1989 (age 37) Kitaakita, Akita, Japan

Sport
- Sport: Skiing
Medal record
Women's biathlon
Representing Japan
Asian Winter Games
| Silver medal – second place | 2011 Astana-Almaty | 15 km individual |
| Bronze medal – third place | 2011 Astana-Almaty | 4×6 km relay |
| Bronze medal – third place | 2017 Sapporo | 12.5 km mass start |
| Bronze medal – third place | 2017 Sapporo | Mixed relay |
European Championships
| Bronze medal – third place | 2018 Ridnaun | 7.5 km sprint |

Fuyuko Tachizaki, née Suzuki (鈴木芙由子, Suzuki Fuyuko; born January 13, 1989 in Kitaakita, Akita) is a Japanese biathlete.

== Career ==
Tachizaki competed in the 2010 Winter Olympics for Japan. Her best performance was 43rd in the sprint. She also finished 53rd in the pursuit and 52nd in the individual.

As of February 2013, her best performance at the Biathlon World Championships is 15th, as part of the 2012 Japanese women's relay team. Her best individual performance is 18th in the 2012 individual and the 2015 mass start.

As of March 2018, Tachizaki's best performance in the Biathlon World Cup is 11th, as part of the mixed relay team at Kontiolahti in 2011/12. Her best individual result is 4th, in the pursuit at Holmenkollen in 2017/18. Her best overall finish in the Biathlon World Cup is 33rd, in 2015/16.

She retired at the end of the 2022/23 season.

She serves in the Japan Self-Defense Forces and is married to fellow biathlete Mikito Tachizaki.

== Biathlon results ==
All results are sourced from the International Biathlon Union.

=== Olympic Games ===
0 medals

| Event | Individual | Sprint | Pursuit | Mass start | Relay | Mixed relay |
|---|---|---|---|---|---|---|
| (Canada) 2010 Vancouver | 52nd | 43rd | 53rd | — | — | —N/a |
| (Russia) 2014 Sochi | 52nd | 39th | 32nd | — | 12th | — |
| (South Korea) 2018 Pyeongchang | 76th | 42nd | 56th | — | 17th | — |
| (China) 2022 Beijing | 27th | 39th | 42nd | — | 17th | 18th |

:*The mixed relay was added as an event in 2014.

=== World Championships ===
0 medals

| Event | Individual | Sprint | Pursuit | Mass start | Relay | Mixed relay | Single mixed relay |
|---|---|---|---|---|---|---|---|
| (South Korea) 2009 Pyeongchang | 87th | 95th | — | — | 16th | 20th | |
| (Russia) 2011 Khanty-Mansiysk | 77th | 40th | LAP | — | 17th | 20th | |
| (Germany) 2012 Ruhpolding | 18th | 24th | 35th | 21st | 15th | 17th | |
| (Czech Republic) 2013 Nové Město | 71st | 41st | 58th | — | LAP | 22nd | |
| (Finland) 2015 Kontiolahti | 33rd | 22nd | 23rd | 17th | 19th | 21st | |
| (Norway) 2016 Oslo | 21st | 47th | 44th | — | 19th | 19th | |
| (Austria) 2017 Hochfilzen | 49th | 74th | — | — | 20th | 15th | |
| (Sweden) 2019 Östersund | 34th | 39th | 26th | — | 19th | 15th | 17th |
| (Italy) 2020 Rasen-Antholz | 34th | 77th | — | — | 21st | 20th | 13th |
| (Slovenia) 2021 Pokljuka | 61st | 59th | 56th | — | 15th | 20th | 18th |
| (Germany) 2023 Oberhof | 23rd | 68th | — | — | 16th | 19th | 22nd |

*During Olympic seasons competitions are only held for those events not included in the Olympic program.
**The single mixed relay was added as an event in 2019.
