= Darya Klimina =

Kazakhstani biathlete (born 1989)

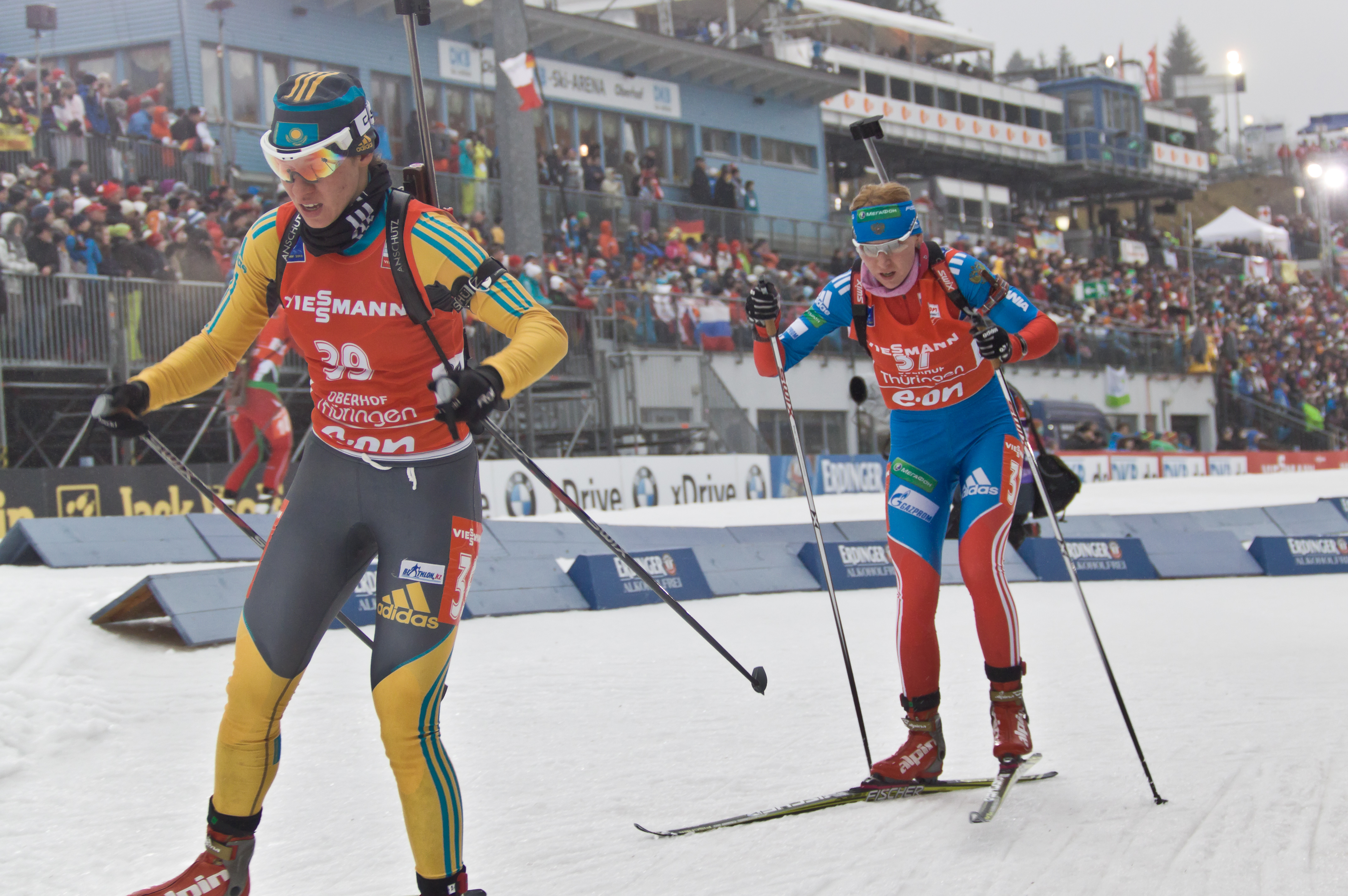
- Usanova (left) in 2013

Personal information
- Born: 6 September 1989 (age 36)

Sport
- Country: Kazakhstan
- Sport: Biathlon
Medal record
Women's biathlon
Representing Kazakhstan
Asian Winter Games
Gold medal – first place	2017 Sapporo	Mixed relay
Bronze medal – third place	2017 Sapporo	10 km pursuit

Darya Sergeyevna Klimina (née Usanova; Russian: Дарья Сергеевна Климина; born 6 September 1989) is a Kazakhstani biathlete. She competed at the Biathlon World Championships 2012 and the Biathlon World Championships 2013. She competed at the 2014 Winter Olympics in Sochi and the 2018 Winter Olympics in South Korea.

== Biathlon results ==
All results are sourced from the International Biathlon Union.

=== Olympic Games ===
0 medals

Event	Individual	Sprint	Pursuit	Mass start	Relay	Mixed relay
(Russia) 2014 Sochi	40th	58th	41st	—	12th	14th
(South Korea) 2018 Pyeongchang	51st	58th	57th	—	14th	—

=== World Championships ===
0 medals

Event	Individual	Sprint	Pursuit	Mass start	Relay	Mixed relay
(Germany) 2012 Ruhpolding	81st	68th	—	—	19th	20th
(Czech Republic) 2013 Nové Město	69th	56th	54th	—	14th	18th
(Finland) 2015 Kontiolahti	57th	81st	—	—	13th	24th
(Norway) 2016 Oslo	51st	27th	35th	—	8th	—
(Austria) 2017 Hochfilzen	—	51st	54th	—	12th	—

*During Olympic seasons competitions are only held for those events not included in the Olympic program.
