= Biathlon World Championships 2013 – Men's sprint =

Men's sprint at the Biathlon World Championships 2013
- Date: 9 February 2013
- Competitors: 136 from 40 nations
- Winning time: 23:25.1

Medalists
gold medal	Emil Hegle Svendsen	Norway
silver medal	Martin Fourcade	France
bronze medal	Jakov Fak	Slovenia

The Men's sprint event of the Biathlon World Championships 2013 was held on February 9, 2013 at 13:00 local time.

== Results ==
Rank	Bib	Name	Nationality	Time	Penalties (P+S)	Deficit
1st place, gold medalist(s)	32	Emil Hegle Svendsen	Norway	23:25.1	1 (0+1)	—
2nd place, silver medalist(s)	28	Martin Fourcade	France	23:33.2	1 (0+1)	+8.1
3rd place, bronze medalist(s)	53	Jakov Fak	Slovenia	23:36.3	0 (0+0)	+11.2
4	58	Ole Einar Bjørndalen	Norway	23:45.0	1 (0+1)	+19.9
5	48	Dmitry Malyshko	Russia	23:48.3	0 (0+0)	+23.2
6	37	Alexis Bœuf	France	23:50.1	0 (0+0)	+25.0
7	17	Anton Shipulin	Russia	23:58.0	1 (1+0)	+32.9
8	3	Fredrik Lindström	Sweden	24:03.1	2 (1+1)	+38.0
9	34	Evgeny Ustyugov	Russia	24:03.5	1 (0+1)	+38.4
10	71	Simon Eder	Austria	24:03.7	0 (0+0)	+38.8
11	15	Krasimir Anev	Bulgaria	24:13.4	0 (0+0)	+48.3
12	65	Erik Lesser	Germany	24:14.5	1 (0+1)	+49.4
13	42	Björn Ferry	Sweden	24:17.4	0 (0+0)	+52.3
14	46	Lukas Hofer	Italy	24:22.2	1 (0+1)	+57.1
15	10	Dominik Landertinger	Austria	24:23.3	1 (0+1)	+58.2
16	111	Arnd Peiffer	Germany	24:33.2	1 (1+0)	+1:08.1
17	26	Andriy Deryzemlya	Ukraine	24:37.7	1 (0+1)	+1:12.6
18	21	Tarjei Bø	Norway	24:38.6	2 (0+2)	+1:13.5
19	54	Evgeniy Garanichev	Russia	24:39.3	2 (2+0)	+1:14.2
20	45	Jean-Guillaume Béatrix	France	24:40.1	2 (0+2)	+1:15.0
21	64	Klemen Bauer	Slovenia	24:40.9	2 (0+2)	+1:15.8
22	33	Tomas Kaukėnas	Lithuania	24:44.6	0 (0+0)	+1:19.5
23	8	Andreas Birnbacher	Germany	24:49.8	2 (0+2)	+1:24.7
24	117	Zdeněk Vítek	Czech Republic	24:50.5	1 (0+1)	+1:25.4
25	24	Benjamin Weger	Switzerland	24:52.6	1 (1+0)	+1:27.5
26	85	Christian De Lorenzi	Italy	24:55.3	0 (0+0)	+1:30.2
27	22	Jaroslav Soukup	Czech Republic	24:56.6	2 (0+2)	+1:31.5
28	7	Tim Burke	United States	25:01.3	2 (1+1)	+1:36.2
28	27	Simon Schempp	Germany	25:01.3	2 (0+2)	+1:36.2
30	50	Matej Kazár	Slovakia	25:01.5	4 (3+1)	+1:36.4
31	93	Kauri Kõiv	Estonia	25:02.2	1 (1+0)	+1:37.1
32	78	Lowell Bailey	United States	25:02.8	1 (1+0)	+1:37.7
33	89	Daniel Mesotitsch	Austria	25:04.2	2 (0+2)	+1:39.1
34	83	Simon Fourcade	France	25:06.7	0 (0+0)	+1:41.6
35	62	Ondřej Moravec	Czech Republic	25:07.0	3 (3+0)	+1:41.9
36	18	Jean-Philippe Leguellec	Canada	25:09.9	3 (1+2)	+1:44.8
37	112	Henrik L'Abée-Lund	Norway	25:10.2	2 (1+1)	+1:45.1
38	2	Jarkko Kauppinen	Finland	25:11.2	1 (1+0)	+1:46.1
39	47	Serguei Sednev	Ukraine	25:19.2	2 (1+1)	+1:54.1
40	49	Edgars Piksons	Latvia	25:19.7	2 (0+2)	+1:54.6
41	105	Serhiy Semenov	Ukraine	25:19.8	2 (1+1)	+1:54.7
42	126	Artem Pryma	Ukraine	25:23.6	1 (0+1)	+1:58.5
43	79	Vladimir Iliev	Bulgaria	25:28.2	3 (1+2)	+2:03.1
44	113	Russell Currier	United States	25:30.4	2 (2+0)	+2:05.3
45	96	Scott Gow	Canada	25:31.5	1 (0+1)	+2:06.4
45	100	Aliaksandr Babchyn	Belarus	25:31.5	1 (0+1)	+2:06.4
47	52	Yan Savitskiy	Kazakhstan	25:36.2	1 (1+0)	+2:11.1
48	88	Claudio Böckli	Switzerland	25:38.3	0 (0+0)	+2:13.2
49	70	Milanko Petrović	Serbia	25:38.7	3 (1+2)	+2:13.6
50	114	Pavol Hurajt	Slovakia	25:39.3	1 (0+1)	+2:14.2
51	66	Junji Nagai	Japan	25:42.0	1 (0+1)	+2:16.9
52	86	Michal Šlesingr	Czech Republic	25:43.3	3 (1+2)	+2:18.2
53	104	Leif Nordgren	United States	25:43.8	1 (1+0)	+2:18.7
54	61	Carl Johan Bergman	Sweden	25:44.0	4 (1+3)	+2:18.9
55	63	Stefan Gavrila	Romania	25:50.1	3 (0+3)	+2:25.0
56	1	Hidenori Isa	Japan	25:51.9	3 (2+1)	+2:26.8
57	124	Vladimir Chepelin	Belarus	25:52.6	1 (0+1)	+2:27.5
58	40	Dominik Windisch	Italy	25:55.9	4 (1+3)	+2:30.8
59	36	Miroslav Matiaško	Slovakia	26:00.9	2 (1+1)	+2:35.8
60	123	Christian Martinelli	Italy	26:01.1	2 (1+1)	+2:36.0
61	98	Christoffer Eriksson	Sweden	26:03.7	3 (0+3)	+2:38.6
62	60	Kevin Kane	Great Britain	26:04.6	0 (0+0)	+2:39.5
63	95	Peter Dokl	Slovenia	26:06.2	2 (1+1)	+2:41.1
64	35	Evgeny Abramenko	Belarus	26:07.7	3 (1+2)	+2:42.6
65	5	Andrejs Rastorgujevs	Latvia	26:08.3	4 (2+2)	+2:43.2
66	76	Scott Perras	Canada	26:08.4	3 (2+1)	+2:43.3
67	121	Julian Eberhard	Austria	26:13.6	5 (2+3)	+2:48.5
68	133	Simon Desthieux	France	26:14.5	3 (1+2)	+2:49.4
69	80	Sergey Novikov	Belarus	26:14.8	4 (3+1)	+2:49.7
70	68	Ahti Toivanen	Finland	26:17.8	4 (1+3)	+2:52.7
70	116	Miroslav Kenanov	Bulgaria	26:17.8	2 (1+1)	+2:52.7
72	120	Roland Lessing	Estonia	26:17.9	3 (1+2)	+2:52.8
73	134	Nathan Smith	Canada	26:22.5	2 (1+1)	+2:57.4
74	59	Karol Dombrovski	Lithuania	26:25.9	2 (1+1)	+3:00.8
75	13	Cornel Puchianu	Romania	26:30.9	4 (2+2)	+3:05.8
76	97	Remus Faur	Romania	26:32.1	1 (0+1)	+3:07.0
77	31	Joel Sloof	Netherlands	26:35.8	1 (1+0)	+3:10.7
78	11	Janez Marič	Slovenia	26:37.6	5 (3+2)	+3:12.5
79	44	Mario Dolder	Switzerland	26:39.0	4 (1+3)	+3:13.9
80	87	Krzysztof Plywaczyk	Poland	26:42.3	3 (1+2)	+3:17.2
81	110	Sergey Naumik	Kazakhstan	26:42.9	1 (0+1)	+3:17.8
82	119	Simon Hallenbarter	Switzerland	26:43.6	3 (1+2)	+3:18.5
83	14	Chen Haibin	China	26:44.6	1 (1+0)	+3:19.5
84	81	Łukasz Szczurek	Poland	26:46.5	2 (0+2)	+3:21.4
85	39	Alexsandr Chervykhov	Kazakhstan	26:47.1	2 (1+1)	+3:22.0
86	92	Karolis Zlatkauskas	Lithuania	26:50.5	3 (3+0)	+3:25.4
87	38	Indrek Tobreluts	Estonia	26:51.3	5 (2+3)	+3:26.2
88	122	Li Xuezhi	China	26:52.6	4 (2+2)	+3:27.5
89	132	Roland Gerbacea	Romania	26:58.4	2 (0+2)	+3:33.3
90	82	Danil Steptsenko	Estonia	26:59.9	3 (1+2)	+3:34.8
91	99	Michail Kletcherov	Bulgaria	27:04.3	4 (2+2)	+3:39.2
92	106	Ondrej Otčenáš	Slovakia	27:04.9	5 (3+2)	+3:39.8
93	103	Ville Simola	Finland	27:07.0	2 (1+1)	+3:41.9
94	4	Alexei Almoukov	Australia	27:07.2	3 (1+2)	+3:42.1
95	73	Pedro Quintana Arias	Spain	27:11.2	0 (0+0)	+3:46.1
96	109	Li Zhonghai	China	27:13.5	3 (2+1)	+3:48.4
97	20	Adam Kwak	Poland	27:14.5	2 (0+2)	+3:49.4
98	101	Rolands Pužulis	Latvia	27:15.1	1 (0+1)	+3:50.0
99	69	Ren Long	China	27:17.9	3 (2+1)	+3:52.8
100	129	Ryo Maeda	Japan	27:22.5	2 (1+1)	+3:57.4
101	9	Victor Pinzaru	Moldova	27:25.2	0 (0+0)	+4:00.1
102	128	Lukasz Slonina	Poland	27:26.7	1 (1+0)	+4:01.6
103	12	Darko Damjanovski	Macedonia	27:27.5	3 (0+3)	+4:02.4
104	127	Pete Beyer	Great Britain	27:29.5	2 (1+1)	+4:04.4
105	136	Mika Kaljunen	Finland	27:30.3	1 (1+0)	+4:05.2
106	43	Lee-Steve Jackson	Great Britain	27:33.0	4 (2+2)	+4:07.9
107	75	Nemanja Košarac	Bosnia and Herzegovina	27:33.5	2 (1+1)	+4:08.4
108	6	Dino Butković	Croatia	27:33.7	1 (0+1)	+4:08.6
109	102	Marcel Laponder	Great Britain	27:37.9	2 (1+1)	+4:12.8
110	90	Damir Rastić	Serbia	27:39.3	3 (1+2)	+4:14.2
111	72	Lee In-bok	South Korea	27:44.3	2 (0+2)	+4:19.2
113	115	Alexandr Trifonov	Kazakhstan	27:51.5	3 (1+2)	+4:26.4
113	118	Oskars Muižnieks	Latvia	27:52.4	2 (1+1)	+4:27.3
114	108	Lee Su-young	South Korea	28:00.3	3 (2+1)	+4:35.2
115	19	Milán Szabó	Hungary	28:02.9	6 (4+2)	+4:37.8
116	16	Emir Hrkalović	Serbia	28:07.8	4 (3+1)	+4:42.7
117	131	Edin Hodžić	Serbia	28:15.8	0 (0+0)	+4:50.7
118	51	Károly Gombos	Hungary	28:19.5	3 (1+2)	+4:54.4
119	25	Thorsten Langer	Belgium	28:33.0	2 (2+0)	+5:07.9
120	94	Victor Lobo Escolar	Spain	28:33.1	4 (1+3)	+5:08.0
121	125	Kim Yong-gyu	South Korea	28:44.7	4 (1+3)	+5:19.6
122	23	Samuel Pulido Serrano	Spain	28:53.9	4 (1+3)	+5:28.8
123	56	Thierry Langer	Belgium	28:58.5	2 (0+2)	+5:33.4
124	41	Ahmet Üstüntaş	Turkey	29:01.8	3 (1+2)	+5:36.7
125	30	Øystein Slettemark	Greenland	29:05.7	6 (2+4)	+5:40.6
126	107	Sho Wakamatsu	Japan	29:10.8	4 (2+2)	+5:45.7
127	135	Aleksandr Lavrinovič	Lithuania	29:11.6	4 (3+1)	+5:46.5
128	57	Orhangazi Civil	Turkey	29:22.6	3 (0+3)	+5:57.5
129	67	Gjorgji Icoski	Macedonia	29:25.6	1 (1+0)	+6:00.5
130	29	Jun Je-uk	South Korea	29:48.5	4 (1+3)	+6:23.4
131	77	Cameron Morton	Australia	30:32.6	5 (2+3)	+7:07.5
132	130	Manuel Fernández Musso	Spain	30:40.6	3 (1+2)	+7:15.5
133	84	Dyllan Harmer	Australia	30:42.6	2 (1+1)	+7:17.5
134	55	Jurica Veverec	Croatia	31:11.0	5 (4+1)	+7:45.9
135	74	Kleanthis Karamichas	Greece	31:17.8	4 (3+1)	+7:52.7
136	91	István Muskatal	Hungary	31:39.1	5 (2+3)	+8:14.0
