= Biathlon World Championships 2013 – Men's relay =

Men's relay at the Biathlon World Championships 2013
- Date: 16 February 2013
- Competitors: 116 from 29 nations
- Winning time: 1:15:39.0

Medalists
gold medal	Ole Einar Bjørndalen; Henrik L'Abée-Lund; Tarjei Bø; Emil Hegle Svendsen	Norway
silver medal	Simon Fourcade; Jean-Guillaume Béatrix; Alexis Bœuf; Martin Fourcade	France
bronze medal	Simon Schempp; Andreas Birnbacher; Arnd Peiffer; Erik Lesser	Germany

The Men's relay event of the Biathlon World Championships 2013 was held on February 16, 2013. 29 nations participated over a course of 4 × 7.5 km.

== Results ==
The race was started at 15:15.

Rank	Bib	Team	Time	Penalties (P+S)	Deficit
1st place, gold medalist(s)	3	Norway; Ole Einar Bjørndalen; Henrik L'Abée-Lund; Tarjei Bø; Emil Hegle Svendsen	1:15:39.0; 18:34.9; 18:50.2; 18:52.4; 19:21.5	0+2 0+3; 0+1 0+2; 0+0 0+0; 0+1 0+0; 0+0 0+1	
2nd place, silver medalist(s)	1	France; Simon Fourcade; Jean-Guillaume Béatrix; Alexis Bœuf; Martin Fourcade	1:16:51.8; 18:58.8; 19:10.4; 19:35.3; 19:07.3	0+0 0+7; 0+0 0+3; 0+0 0+1; 0+0 0+1; 0+0 0+2	+1:12.8
3rd place, bronze medalist(s)	5	Germany; Simon Schempp; Andreas Birnbacher; Arnd Peiffer; Erik Lesser	1:16:57.5; 18:30.8; 18:54.6; 19:08.7; 20:23.4	0+0 2+3; 0+0 0+0; 0+0 0+0; 0+0 0+0; 0+0 2+3	+1:18.5
4	2	Russia; Anton Shipulin; Evgeny Ustyugov; Evgeniy Garanichev; Dmitry Malyshko	1:17:03.1; 18:35.2; 18:59.1; 20:13.6; 19:15.2	0+1 2+6; 0+0 0+1; 0+0 0+1; 0+0 2+3; 0+1 0+1	+1:24.1
5	4	Austria; Simon Eder; Daniel Mesotitsch; Christoph Sumann; Dominik Landertinger	1:17:17.9; 18:37.5; 19:11.0; 19:53.0; 19:36.4	0+0 0+5; 0+0 0+0; 0+0 0+2; 0+0 0+1; 0+0 0+2	+1:38.9
6	8	Czech Republic; Michal Šlesingr; Ondřej Moravec; Jaroslav Soukup; Michal Krčmář	1:18:29.1; 18:34.8; 19:34.1; 20:05.1; 20:15.1	0+3 0+6; 0+0 0+1; 0+2 0+2; 0+1 0+2; 0+0 0+1	+2:50.1
7	11	Italy; Christian De Lorenzi; Dominik Windisch; Christian Martinelli; Lukas Hofer	1:18:43.9; 19:50.2; 19:19.9; 20:18.2; 19:15.6	0+3 1+6; 0+0 1+3; 0+2 0+0; 0+1 0+1; 0+0 0+2	+3:04.9
8	19	Canada; Jean-Philippe Leguellec; Scott Gow; Nathan Smith; Scott Perras	1:18:44.7; 18:54.9; 20:22.4; 19:41.1; 19:46.3	0+4 0+5; 0+1 0+1; 0+2 0+1; 0+1 0+0; 0+0 0+3	+3:05.7
9	15	Bulgaria; Michail Kletcherov; Miroslav Kenanov; Vladimir Iliev; Krasimir Anev	1:80:50.6; 19:07.0; 20:15.7; 19:39.4; 19:48.5	0+2 0+3; 0+1 0+0; 0+0 0+1; 0+1 0+1; 0+0 0+1	+3:11.6
10	9	Slovakia; Dušan Šimočko; Pavol Hurajt; Matej Kazár; Miroslav Matiaško	1:19:06.8; 19:23.2; 19:52.0; 19:22.0; 20:29.6	0+5 0+4; 0+1 0+0; 0+1 0+2; 0+2 0+1; 0+1 0+1	+3:27.8
11	6	Sweden; Carl Johan Bergman; Björn Ferry; Tobias Arwidson; Fredrik Lindström	1:19:26.7; 19:42.0; 19:32.2; 20:19.1; 19:53.4	0+6 1+4; 0+2 1+3; 0+1 0+1; 0+2 0+0; 0+1 0+0	+3:47.7
12	13	United States; Lowell Bailey; Tim Burke; Russell Currier; Leif Nordgren	1:19:40.8; 19:13.2; 19:47.8; 20:21.4; 20:18.4	0+3 0+9; 0+0 0+3; 0+2 0+2; 0+0 0+1; 0+1 0+3	+4:01.8
13	10	Slovenia; Peter Dokl; Klemen Bauer; Janez Marič; Jakov Fak	1:19:54.0; 19:41.3; 20:13.3; 20:46.8; 19:12.6	0+5 1+6; 0+3 0+1; 0+0 1+3; 0+2 0+2; 0+0 0+0	+4:15.0
DSQ	7	Ukraine; Serhiy Semenov; Andriy Deryzemlya; Artem Pryma; Serguei Sednev	1:20:06.1; 19:12.5; 19:13.1; 20:27.0; 21:13.5	0+4 1+4; 0+2 0+0; 0+0 0+0; 0+2 0+1; 0+0 1+3	+4:27.1
14	14	Belarus; Evgeny Abramenko; Sergey Novikov; Vladimir Chepelin; Aliaksandr Babchyn	1:20:39.5; 20:05.1; 19:43.8; 20:11.6; 20:39.0	0+0 1+8; 0+0 1+3; 0+0 0+1; 0+0 0+2; 0+0 0+2	+5:00.5
15	17	Estonia; Kauri Kõiv; Indrek Tobreluts; Roland Lessing; Danil Steptsenko	1:21:01.8; 19:41.7; 19:54.0; 20:15.2; 21:10.9	0+5 0+4; 0+1 0+2; 0+1 0+1; 0+0 0+0; 0+3 0+1	+5:22.8
16	25	China; Chen Haibin; Ren Long; Li Zhonghai; Li Xuezhi	LAP; 19:34.1; 20:19.6; 20:29.6	0+2 2+8; 0+0 0+1; 0+2 0+1; 0+0 0+3; 0+0 2+3	
17	12	Switzerland; Ivan Joller; Benjamin Weger; Claudio Böckli; Mario Dolder	LAP; 19:31.0; 19:39.7; 20:32.7	0+4 3+8; 0+1 0+1; 0+0 0+1; 0+2 0+3; 0+1 3+3	
18	23	Romania; Remus Faur; Ștefan Gavrilă; Roland Gerbacea; Cornel Puchianu	LAP; 20:36.4; 20:45.5; 20:59.3	0+7 0+8; 0+3 0+1; 0+3 0+3; 0+0 0+3; 0+1 0+1	
19	16	Kazakhstan; Alexsandr Chervyhkov; Yan Savitskiy; Sergey Naumik; Dias Keneshev	LAP; 20:55.3; 20:15.8; 20:45.3	0+1 0+3; 0+0 0+1; 0+1 0+1; 0+0 0+1; 0+0 0+0	
20	21	Finland; Ahti Toivanen; Jarkko Kauppinen; Mika Kaljunen; Ville Simola	LAP; 20:08.3; 20:23.4; 21:33.7	0+5 1+4; 0+0 1+3; 0+1 0+1; 0+3 0+0; 0+1 0+0	
21	24	Latvia; Edgars Piksons; Andrejs Rastorgujevs; Rolands Pužulis; Oskars Muižnieks	LAP; 20:06.1; 19:21.0; 21:25.4	2+6 0+3; 0+1 0+1; 0+1 0+2; 0+1 0+0; 2+3 0+0	
22	22	Great Britain; Lee-Steve Jackson; Kevin Kane; Pete Beyer; Marcel Laponder	LAP; 20:37.2; 20:32.3; 21:40.5	0+3 0+3; 0+3 0+2; 0+0 0+0; 0+0 0+1; 0+0 0+0	
23	28	South Korea; Jun Je-Uk; Lee In-Bok; Lee Su-Young; Kim Yong-Gyu	LAP; 20:09.0; 21:02.0; 21:38.8	0+5 1+5; 0+2 0+1; 0+0 0+0; 0+1 0+1; 0+2 1+3	
24	26	Lithuania; Tomas Kaukėnas; Karol Dombrovski; Karolis Zlatkauskas; Aleksandr Lavrinovič	LAP; 19:13.8; 21:16.0; 22:28.8	0+6 3+9; 0+1 0+2; 0+0 1+3; 0+2 2+3; 0+3 0+1	
25	18	Japan; Junji Nagai; Hidenori Isa; Sho Wakamatsu; Ryo Maeda	LAP; 19:15.1; 21:19.5; 21:50.8	0+4 2+9; 0+1 0+0; 0+1 0+3; 0+0 0+3; 0+2 2+3	
26	27	Serbia; Damir Rastić; Emir Hrkalović; Milanko Petrović; Edin Hodžić	LAP; 21:02.9; 21:18.7; 21:44.2	1+5 1+5; 0+2 0+2; 0+0 0+0; 1+3 1+3; 0+0 0+0	
27	20	Poland; Łukasz Szczurek; Adam Kwak; Krzysztof Plywaczyk; Lukasz Slonina	LAP; 21:15.0; 21:31.5; 20:30.6	0+3 4+9; 0+0 3+3; 0+2 0+2; 0+0 0+1; 0+1 1+3	
28	29	Spain; Samuel Pulido Serrano; Víctor Lobo Escolar; Manuel Fernández Musso; Pedro Quintana Arias	LAP; 20:39.5; 22:14.5; 25:48.6	1+4 3+3; 0+1 0+0; 0+0 0+0; 1+3 3+3; 0+0	
