= 2012–13 Biathlon World Cup – Overall Men =

== 2011–12 Top 3 Standings ==
Medal	Athlete	Points
Gold:	(France) Martin Fourcade	1100
Silver:	(Norway) Emil Hegle Svendsen	1035
Bronze:	(Germany) Andreas Birnbacher	837

== Events summary ==
Event:	Winner:	Second:	Third:
Östersund 20 km Individual details	Martin Fourcade; France	Dominik Landertinger; Austria	Erik Lesser; Germany
Östersund 10 km Sprint details	Jean-Philippe Leguellec; Canada	Alexis Bœuf; France	Christoph Sumann; Austria
Östersund 12.5 km Pursuit details	Martin Fourcade; France	Andreas Birnbacher; Germany	Anton Shipulin; Russia
Hochfilzen 10 km Sprint details	Andreas Birnbacher; Germany	Martin Fourcade; France	Jakov Fak; Slovenia
Hochfilzen 12.5 km Pursuit details	Jakov Fak; Slovenia	Dmitry Malyshko; Russia	Martin Fourcade; France
Pokljuka 10 km Sprint details	Jakov Fak; Slovenia	Emil Hegle Svendsen; Norway	Martin Fourcade; France
Pokljuka 12.5 km Pursuit details	Emil Hegle Svendsen; Norway	Ondřej Moravec; Czech Republic	Martin Fourcade; France
Pokljuka 15 km Mass start details	Andreas Birnbacher; Germany	Jakov Fak; Slovenia	Tim Burke; United States
Oberhof 10 km Sprint details	Dmitry Malyshko; Russia	Evgeniy Garanichev; Russia	Emil Hegle Svendsen; Norway
Oberhof 12.5 km Pursuit details	Dmitry Malyshko; Russia	Evgeniy Garanichev; Russia	Ondřej Moravec; Czech Republic
Ruhpolding 10 km Sprint details	Martin Fourcade; France	Evgeny Ustyugov; Russia	Andrei Makoveev; Russia
Ruhpolding 15 km Mass start details	Martin Fourcade; France	Dmitry Malyshko; Russia	Emil Hegle Svendsen; Norway
Antholz 10 km Sprint details	Anton Shipulin; Russia	Emil Hegle Svendsen; Norway	Jakov Fak; Slovenia
Antholz 12.5 km Pursuit details	Anton Shipulin; Russia	Jakov Fak; Slovenia	Daniel Mesotitsch; Austria
World Championships 10 km Sprint details	Emil Hegle Svendsen; Norway	Martin Fourcade; France	Jakov Fak; Slovenia
World Championships 12.5 km Pursuit details	Emil Hegle Svendsen; Norway	Martin Fourcade; France	Anton Shipulin; Russia
World Championships 20 km Individual details	Martin Fourcade; France	Tim Burke; United States	Fredrik Lindström; Sweden
World Championships 15 km Mass start details	Tarjei Bø; Norway	Anton Shipulin; Russia	Emil Hegle Svendsen; Norway
Holmenkollen 10 km Sprint details	Tarjei Bø; Norway	Martin Fourcade; France	Andriy Deryzemlya; Ukraine
Holmenkollen 12.5 km Pursuit details	Martin Fourcade; France	Tarjei Bø; Norway	Alexandr Loginov; Russia
Holmenkollen 15 km Mass start details	Ondřej Moravec; Czech Republic	Martin Fourcade; France	Erik Lesser; Germany
Sochi 20 km Individual details	Martin Fourcade; France	Andreas Birnbacher; Germany	Serhiy Semenov; Ukraine
Sochi 10 km Sprint details	Martin Fourcade; France	Evgeny Ustyugov; Russia	Henrik L'Abée-Lund; Norway
Khanty-Mansiysk 10 km Sprint details	Martin Fourcade; France	Lukas Hofer; Italy	Andreas Birnbacher; Germany
Khanty-Mansiysk 12.5 km Pursuit details	Christoph Sumann; Austria	Simon Fourcade; France	Martin Fourcade; France
Khanty-Mansiysk 12.5 km Pursuit details	Christoph Sumann; Austria	Simon Fourcade; France	Michal Šlesingr; Czech Republic
Khanty-Mansiysk 15 km Mass start details	Martin Fourcade; France	Dominik Landertinger; Austria	Emil Hegle Svendsen; Norway

== Standings ==
#	Name	ÖST IN	ÖST SP	ÖST PU	HOC SP	HOC PU	POK SP	POK PU	POK MS	OBE SP	OBE PU	RUH SP	RUH MS	ANT SP	ANT PU	WCH SP	WCH PU	WCH IN	WCH MS	HOL SP	HOL PU	HOL MS	SOC IN	SOC SP	KHM SP	KHM PU	KHM MS	Total
1.	Martin Fourcade (FRA)	60	31	60	54	48	48	48	43	~~25~~	~~27~~	60	60	38	43	54	54	60	31	54	60	54	60	60	60	48	60	1248
2	Emil Hegle Svendsen (NOR)	43	38	40	7	27	54	60	38	48	43	43	48	54	40	60	60	—	48	—	—	—	—	—	11	17	48	827
3	Dominik Landertinger (AUT)	54	19	24	17	34	0	14	18	0	—	30	30	24	36	26	40	27	38	43	30	15	19	43	40	40	54	715
4	Jakov Fak (SLO)	0	5	4	48	60	60	19	54	20	8	29	38	48	54	48	38	21	22	18	31	25	18	26	0	—	15	709
5	Andreas Birnbacher (GER)	16	34	54	60	40	1	28	60	—	—	19	36	43	—	18	19	34	30	2	18	23	54	18	48	22	14	691
6	Evgeny Ustyugov (RUS)	40	30	34	40	32	36	38	36	40	38	54	28	6	23	32	25	0	25	—	—	—	20	54	21	25	—	677
7	Fredrik Lindström (SWE)	17	12	16	29	43	31	40	26	36	29	0	18	26	29	34	36	48	29	25	36	32	~~7~~	14	9	11	28	654
8	Dmitry Malyshko (RUS)	15	20	36	30	54	0	22	27	60	60	40	54	27	16	40	43	—	26	—	—	—	32	23	0	—	20	645
9	Anton Shipulin (RUS)	32	18	48	24	38	0	—	19	28	30	22	13	60	60	36	48	8	54	—	—	—	—	10	13	23	34	618
10	Tim Burke (USA)	8	23	26	19	18	43	36	48	15	11	—	22	0	27	13	9	54	11	9	26	43	40	13	32	26	43	615
11	Simon Eder (AUT)	21	38	30	14	~~2~~	32	21	25	26	21	27	21	8	11	31	29	0	23	30	38	31	9	16	38	27	40	607
12	Ondřej Moravec (CZE)	27	0	—	18	25	34	54	14	30	48	21	16	0	9	6	10	43	43	1	13	60	27	36	20	19	29	603
13	Jean-Guillaume Béatrix (FRA)	0	0	2	11	26	40	34	22	8	23	34	24	30	32	21	15	28	36	28	27	34	24	27	25	20	18	589
14	Evgeniy Garanichev (RUS)	22	22	32	0	28	27	43	34	54	54	20	19	40	38	22	13	—	16	—	—	—	5	12	17	9	32	559
15	Tarjei Bø (NOR)	—	—	—	—	—	—	—	—	16	19	36	27	—	—	23	24	29	60	60	54	36	26	34	10	28	36	518
16	Erik Lesser (GER)	48	27	28	27	0	9	26	17	13	28	24	11	13	5	29	27	7	40	26	2	48	0	38	12	0	13	518
17	Alexis Bœuf (FRA)	18	54	38	32	30	0	—	21	43	36	28	43	2	18	38	34	14	13	0	—	16	—	15	0	—	—	493
18	Arnd Peiffer (GER)	30	32	40	1	16	0	—	11	29	12	26	26	0	0	25	20	13	18	36	43	19	6	0	28	34	23	491
19	Björn Ferry (SWE)	2	25	27	9	23	25	25	40	—	—	0	32	7	30	28	32	40	34	—	—	12	36	19	0	16	19	481
20	Lukas Hofer (ITA)	0	0	—	13	22	21	0	—	0	13	18	29	18	28	27	30	36	20	20	17	27	34	0	54	36	17	480
21	Michal Šlesingr (CZE)	10	0	14	22	0	23	30	23	24	31	14	23	12	20	0	—	11	—	19	21	22	16	28	34	48	31	476
22	Ole Einar Bjørndalen (NOR)	—	7	22	25	36	20	23	29	31	26	—	—	—	—	43	31	16	17	23	29	28	17	0	24	—	16	463
23	Andriy Deryzemlya (UKR)	0	26	3	0	5	0	17	—	0	—	32	25	0	—	24	11	24	21	48	34	38	21	24	22	24	30	429
24	Henrik L'Abée-Lund (NOR)	14	40	8	0	0	28	11	32	17	25	0	34	4	—	4	21	32	24	29	—	—	23	48	—	—	—	394
25	Florian Graf (GER)	11	43	19	10	12	11	8	31	0	—	17	17	28	13	—	—	1	—	15	25	24	0	0	36	32	21	374
26	Andrei Makoveev (RUS)	5	1	17	38	29	14	0	15	23	20	48	12	20	31	—	—	0	—	0	11	40	—	—	18	12	11	365
27	Simon Fourcade (FRA)	—	—	—	—	—	—	—	—	11	24	0	—	0	—	7	18	38	32	38	32	21	0	31	19	54	38	363
28	Lowell Bailey (USA)	4	11	20	5	31	5	13	—	0	0	15	—	36	25	9	28	12	28	0	7	14	0	11	30	31	27	362
29	Simon Schempp (GER)	6	30	21	0	15	26	32	24	12	15	25	40	21	0	13	23	—	27	0	—	11	—	—	—	—	—	341
30	Friedrich Pinter (AUT)	38	21	29	43	24	0	20	30	0	—	6	14	32	22	—	—	0	—	0	14	20	0	0	0	—	—	313
#	Name	ÖST IN	ÖST SP	ÖST PU	HOC SP	HOC PU	POK SP	POK PU	POK MS	OBE SP	OBE PU	RUH SP	RUH MS	ANT SP	ANT PU	WCH SP	WCH PU	WCH IN	WCH MS	HOL SP	HOL PU	HOL MS	SOC IN	SOC SP	KHM SP	KHM PU	KHM MS	Total
31	Carl Johan Bergman (SWE)	23	0	23	36	21	12	29	28	1	5	23	20	0	6	0	7	6	—	—	—	—	4	0	14	38	12	308
32	Daniel Mesotitsch (AUT)	0	16	13	—	—	—	—	—	—	—	—	—	34	48	8	14	0	—	32	23	30	0	4	29	29	24	304
33	Alexey Volkov (RUS)	0	13	31	0	13	—	—	—	38	34	3	—	—	—	—	—	26	—	27	40	29	22	—	0	0	—	276
34	Christoph Sumann (AUT)	7	48	11	0	—	15	9	—	—	—	0	—	—	—	—	—	—	—	—	—	—	29	0	43	60	26	248
35	Jean-Philippe Leguellec (CAN)	0	60	25	31	10	0	—	20	0	0	0	—	0	2	5	26	31	19	—	—	17	0	0	0	—	—	246
36	Andrejs Rastorgujevs (LAT)	0	4	12	12	17	3	31	—	—	—	10	—	0	—	0	—	0	—	31	28	13	43	25	0	0	—	229
37	Klemen Bauer (SLO)	0	0	—	15	7	19	4	—	27	32	8	—	17	4	20	17	0	15	0	0	—	13	30	0	—	—	228
38	Krasimir Anev (BUL)	34	0	0	21	8	0	0	—	18	17	0	—	0	—	30	22	4	—	12	22	—	28	6	0	0	—	222
39	Dominik Windisch (ITA)	29	0	—	0	0	0	0	—	10	3	17	—	29	21	0	8	23	—	21	0	—	0	40	0	—	—	201
40	Julian Eberhard (AUT)	—	—	—	0	19	29	24	16	34	22	1	—	3	17	0	—	—	—	7	15	—	0	0	0	10	—	197
41	Benjamin Weger (SUI)	0	9	10	0	—	6	0	—	32	40	9	—	0	1	16	6	22	14	0	—	—	0	0	27	0	—	192
42	Serhiy Semenov (UKR)	0	0	—	28	11	14	6	—	19	18	0	—	23	7	0	0	—	—	—	—	—	48	0	3	13	—	190
43	Vetle Sjåstad Christiansen (NOR)	—	14	18	26	20	—	—	—	—	—	—	—	—	—	—	—	—	—	—	—	—	0	23	31	30	25	187
44	Vladimir Iliev (BUL)	0	0	0	0	—	38	18	13	9	0	2	—	9	10	0	2	0	—	17	3	—	0	20	8	7	—	156
45	Serguei Sednev (UKR)	26	24	0	0	—	18	7	—	7	16	0	—	12	34	2	—	0	—	—	—	—	—	0	0	—	—	146
46	Alexandr Loginov (RUS)	—	—	—	—	—	—	—	—	—	—	—	—	—	—	—	—	—	—	40	48	26	—	29	—	—	—	143
47	Christian De Lorenzi (ITA)	12	0	—	8	6	0	0	—	—	—	7	—	15	26	15	16	0	—	16	0	—	11	8	0	0	—	140
48	Matej Kazar (SVK)	24	0	0	20	0	2	0	—	0	0	0	—	19	12	11	12	0	—	0	12	—	0	0	5	14	—	131
49	Lars Helge Birkeland (NOR)	20	—	—	0	4	0	—	—	—	—	38	31	10	—	—	—	0	—	0	24	—	—	—	—	—	—	127
50	Zdeněk Vítek (CZE)	0	7	6	23	14	0	0	—	—	—	—	—	—	—	17	0	0	—	22	8	—	30	0	0	0	—	127
51	Erlend Bjøntegaard (NOR)	36	28	9	0	—	—	—	—	6	0	4	—	0	—	—	—	—	—	11	0	—	25	0	—	—	—	119
52	Yan Savitskiy (KAZ)	0	0	—	—	—	0	—	—	14	9	0	—	25	8	0	0	30	—	—	—	—	15	0	16	0	—	117
53	Lars Berger (NOR)	0	17	15	—	—	31	27	12	0	7	0	—	—	—	—	—	—	—	—	—	—	—	—	—	—	—	109
54	Scott Perras (CAN)	9	0	5	16	0	7	10	—	—	—	31	15	0	0	0	—	15	—	0	0	—	0	0	0	—	—	108
55	Alexey Slepov (RUS)	—	—	—	—	—	—	—	—	—	—	—	—	0	—	—	—	—	—	—	—	—	14	32	26	5	22	99
56	Jaroslav Soukup (CZE)	—	—	—	—	—	—	—	—	0	2	13	—	31	19	14	0	2	—	3	0	—	0	3	0	—	—	87
57	Simon Desthieux (FRA)	0	0	0	4	0	16	12	—	22	6	0	—	—	—	0	—	—	—	14	0	—	0	9	0	4	—	87
58	Artem Pryma (UKR)	19	0	0	3	0	22	1	—	0	0	—	—	—	—	0	5	0	—	—	—	—	0	0	23	8	—	81
59	Johannes Thingnes Bø (NOR)	—	—	—	—	—	—	—	—	—	—	—	—	—	—	—	—	—	—	13	16	—	0	21	4	21	—	75
60	Ivan Joller (SUI)	—	—	—	—	—	—	—	—	—	—	—	—	—	—	—	—	17	—	4	20	—	31	0	1	0	—	73
#	Name	ÖST IN	ÖST SP	ÖST PU	HOC SP	HOC PU	POK SP	POK PU	POK MS	OBE SP	OBE PU	RUH SP	RUH MS	ANT SP	ANT PU	WCH SP	WCH PU	WCH IN	WCH MS	HOL SP	HOL PU	HOL MS	SOC IN	SOC SP	KHM SP	KHM PU	KHM MS	Total
61	Daniel Böhm (GER)	—	—	—	—	—	—	—	—	—	—	—	—	—	—	—	—	—	—	24	1	18	0	—	15	15	—	73
62	Jarkko Kauppinen (FIN)	31	0	—	0	3	0	—	—	0	—	0	—	14	14	3	0	0	—	0	0	—	1	0	—	—	—	66
63	Tomas Kaukėnas (LTU)	0	0	0	0	—	0	0	—	—	—	—	—	—	—	19	3	18	12	—	—	—	0	0	7	3	—	62
64	Mario Dolder (SUI)	0	0	0	0	—	11	16	—	0	0	0	—	16	15	0	—	0	—	—	—	—	0	0	0	—	—	58
65	Claudio Böckli (SUI)	25	0	—	0	—	17	0	—	0	0	11	—	0	0	0	0	3	—	0	—	—	0	0	0	0	—	56
66	Benedikt Doll (GER)	—	—	—	6	1	—	—	—	—	—	—	—	—	—	—	—	—	—	—	—	—	38	7	0	0	—	52
67	Olexander Bilanenko (UKR)	0	10	0	0	—	—	—	—	4	14	5	—	0	—	—	—	0	—	5	10	—	0	0	—	—	—	48
68	Simon Hallenbarter (SUI)	0	0	—	34	9	0	—	—	4	0	0	—	0	0	0	—	—	—	0	—	—	—	—	—	—	—	47
69	Miroslav Matiaško (SVK)	28	0	—	0	—	4	2	—	—	—	—	—	0	—	0	0	9	—	0	—	—	0	0	—	—	—	43
70	Johannes Kühn (GER)	—	—	—	—	—	24	15	—	0	0	0	—	0	0	—	—	—	—	—	—	—	—	—	—	—	—	39
71	Maxim Tsvetkov (RUS)	—	—	—	—	—	—	—	—	—	—	—	—	—	—	—	—	—	—	34	4	—	—	0	—	—	—	38
72	Leif Nordgren (USA)	0	0	0	0	—	—	—	—	5	0	0	—	1	3	0	0	19	—	0	0	—	0	1	0	6	—	35
73	Christian Martinelli (ITA)	—	—	—	—	—	0	—	—	0	10	—	—	0	24	0	0	—	—	—	—	—	—	—	—	—	—	34
74	Pavol Hurajt (SVK)	—	—	—	0	0	—	—	—	—	—	0	—	—	—	0	4	0	—	—	—	—	10	0	2	18	—	34
75	Sergey Novikov (BLR)	1	0	—	0	—	0	—	—	0	0	—	—	0	—	0	—	25	—	0	—	—	0	0	0	—	—	26
76	Indrek Tobreluts (EST)	0	—	—	0	—	0	3	—	—	—	—	—	22	0	0	—	0	—	0	—	—	0	0	0	0	—	25
77	Scott Gow (CAN)	—	—	—	—	—	0	0	—	—	—	12	—	0	—	0	0	10	—	0	—	—	0	0	0	0	—	22
78	Markus Windisch (ITA)	0	0	0	0	—	—	—	—	21	0	—	—	—	—	—	—	—	—	—	—	—	0	—	—	—	—	21
79	Evgeny Abramenko (BLR)	3	0	—	0	0	0	0	—	0	0	0	—	0	—	0	—	—	—	7	9	—	2	0	0	—	—	21
80	Peter Dokl (SLO)	0	0	—	0	—	0	0	—	0	—	0	—	0	—	0	—	20	—	0	—	—	0	0	0	—	—	20
81	Aleksandr Pechenkin (RUS)	—	—	—	—	—	—	—	—	—	—	—	—	—	—	—	—	—	—	0	19	—	—	—	0	—	—	19
82	Tobias Eberhard (AUT)	—	—	—	—	—	—	—	—	0	0	—	—	—	—	—	—	—	—	—	—	—	0	17	0	0	—	17
83	Christoffer Eriksson (SWE)	0	15	1	0	0	0	0	—	0	—	0	—	0	—	0	—	0	—	—	—	—	0	0	0	—	—	16
84	Kauri Koiv (EST)	0	0	0	0	—	—	—	—	0	0	0	—	0	—	10	0	5	—	0	—	—	0	0	0	—	—	15
85	Ivan Tcherezov (RUS)	—	—	—	—	—	0	—	—	—	—	—	—	—	—	—	—	—	—	10	5	—	—	—	—	—	—	15
86	Milanko Petrović (SRB)	—	—	—	—	—	0	—	—	2	1	0	—	0	—	0	0	0	—	0	6	—	0	6	0	—	—	15
87	Hidenori Isa (JPN)	13	—	—	—	—	0	—	—	—	—	—	—	—	—	0	0	0	—	0	—	—	0	0	—	—	—	13
88	Magnús Jónsson (SWE)	0	0	—	0	—	8	0	—	—	—	0	—	5	0	—	—	—	—	—	—	—	—	—	—	—	—	13
89	Michail Kletcherov (BUL)	0	0	—	0	—	0	—	—	0	—	0	—	0	—	0	—	0	—	0	—	—	12	0	0	—	—	12
90	Tobias Arwidson (SWE)	0	0	7	0	—	0	5	—	—	—	—	—	—	—	—	—	—	—	0	—	—	0	0	0	0	—	12
#	Name	ÖST IN	ÖST SP	ÖST PU	HOC SP	HOC PU	POK SP	POK PU	POK MS	OBE SP	OBE PU	RUH SP	RUH MS	ANT SP	ANT PU	WCH SP	WCH PU	WCH IN	WCH MS	HOL SP	HOL PU	HOL MS	SOC IN	SOC SP	KHM SP	KHM PU	KHM MS	Total
91	Dušan Šimočko (SVK)	—	—	—	—	—	0	—	—	0	0	0	—	0	0	—	—	0	—	8	0	—	—	0	0	1	—	9
92	Ahti Toivanen (FIN)	0	8	0	0	—	0	—	—	—	—	0	—	0	0	0	—	0	—	0	—	—	0	0	0	—	—	8
93	Alexei Almoukov (AUS)	0	0	—	0	0	0	—	—	0	—	0	—	0	—	0	—	0	—	0	—	—	8	0	0	—	—	8
94	Christoph Stephan (GER)	—	—	—	—	—	—	—	—	—	—	—	—	—	—	—	—	—	—	—	—	—	0	0	6	2	—	8
95	Marc-André Bédard (CAN)	—	—	—	—	—	—	—	—	0	4	—	—	—	—	—	—	—	—	—	—	—	—	—	—	—	—	4
96	Danil Steptsenko (EST)	0	3	0	—	—	0	—	—	—	—	0	—	—	—	0	—	0	—	0	—	—	—	—	—	—	—	3
97	Sergey Klyachin (RUS)	—	—	—	—	—	—	—	—	—	—	—	—	—	—	—	—	—	—	—	—	—	3	0	—	—	—	3
98	Pietro Dutto (ITA)	0	2	0	0	—	0	—	—	0	—	0	—	0	0	—	—	0	—	0	—	—	0	0	0	0	—	2
99	Vincent Jay (FRA)	0	0	—	2	0	—	—	—	—	—	—	—	—	—	—	—	—	—	—	—	—	—	—	—	—	—	2
100	Vit Janov (CZE)	—	—	—	—	—	—	—	—	—	—	—	—	—	—	—	—	—	—	—	—	—	0	2	0	—	—	2
101	Edgars Piksons (LAT)	0	0	—	0	—	—	—	—	0	—	—	—	—	—	1	1	0	—	0	—	—	—	—	0	—	—	2
