= 2012–13 Biathlon World Cup – Sprint Men =

The 2012–13 Biathlon World Cup – Sprint Men will start at Saturday December 1, 2012 in Östersund and will finish Thursday March 14, 2013 in Khanty-Mansiysk. Defending titlist is Martin Fourcade of France.

== Competition format ==
The 10 kilometres (6,23 mi) sprint race is the third oldest biathlon event; the distance is skied over three laps. The biathlete shoots two times at any shooting lane, first prone, then standing, totalling 10 targets. For each missed target the biathlete has to complete a penalty lap of around 150 metres. Competitors' starts are staggered, normally by 30 seconds.

== 2011-12 Top 3 Standings ==
Medal	Athlete	Points
Gold:	(France) Martin Fourcade	423
Silver:	(Norway) Emil Hegle Svendsen	378
Bronze:	(Sweden) Carl Johan Bergman	287

== Medal winners ==
Event:	Gold:	Time	Silver:	Time	Bronze:	Time
Östersund details	Jean-Philippe Leguellec; Canada	25:10.4 (0+0)	Alexis Bœuf; France	25:28.5 (0+1)	Christoph Sumann; Austria	25:35.2 (0+1)
Hochfilzen details	Andreas Birnbacher; Germany	25:31.1 (0+0)	Martin Fourcade; France	25:31.5 (1+0)	Jakov Fak; Slovenia	25:44.8 (0+1)
Pokljuka details	Jakov Fak; Slovenia	24:41.7 (0+0)	Emil Hegle Svendsen; Norway	24:42.5 (0+1)	Martin Fourcade; France	24:47.8 (0+0)
Oberhof details	Dmitry Malyshko; Russia	25:07.9 (1+0)	Evgeniy Garanichev; Russia	25:20.5 (1+0)	Emil Hegle Svendsen; Norway	25:21.0 (0+1)
Ruhpolding details	Martin Fourcade; France	23:51.5 (0+0)	Evgeny Ustyugov; Russia	24:07.9 (0+0)	Andrei Makoveev; Russia	24:24.5 (0+0)
Antholz details	Anton Shipulin; Russia	22:45.8 (0+0)	Emil Hegle Svendsen; Norway	22:58.6 (1+0)	Jakov Fak; Slovenia	23:06.2 (0+1)
Biathlon World Championships 2013 details	Emil Hegle Svendsen; Norway	23:25.1 (0+1)	Martin Fourcade; France	23:33.2 (0+1)	Jakov Fak; Slovenia	23:36.3 (0+0)
Holmenkollen details	Tarjei Bø; Norway	25:44.5 (0+0)	Martin Fourcade; France	25:44.6 (1+1)	Andriy Deryzemlya; Ukraine	25:52.2 (0+0)
Sochi details	Martin Fourcade; France	25:17.3 (0+0)	Evgeny Ustyugov; Russia	25:59.6 (0+1)	Henrik L'Abée-Lund; Norway	26:08.3 (0+0)
Khanty-Mansiysk details	Martin Fourcade; France	24:22.6 (0+0)	Lukas Hofer; Italy	25:02.2 (0+0)	Andreas Birnbacher; Germany	25:06.4 (0+0)

== Standings ==
#	Name	ÖST	HOC	POK	OBE	RUP	ANT	WCH	HOL	SOC	KHA	Total
1	Martin Fourcade (FRA)	31	54	48	25	60	38	54	54	60	60	484
2	Emil Hegle Svendsen (NOR)	38	7	54	48	43	54	60	—	—	11	315
3	Evgeny Ustyugov (RUS)	30	40	36	40	54	6	32	—	54	21	313
4	Jakov Fak (SLO)	5	48	60	20	29	48	48	18	26	0	302
5	Simon Eder (AUT)	38	14	32	26	27	8	31	30	16	48	260
6	Andreas Birnbacher (GER)	34	60	1	—	19	43	18	2	18	48	243
7	Dominik Landertinger (AUT)	19	17	0	0	30	24	26	43	43	40	242
8	Dmitry Malyshko (RUS)	20	30	0	60	40	27	40	—	23	0	240
9	Jean-Guillaume Béatrix (FRA)	0	11	40	8	34	30	21	28	27	25	224
10	Erik Lesser (GER)	27	27	9	13	24	13	29	26	38	12	218
11	Fredrik Lindström (SWE)	12	29	31	36	0	26	34	25	14	9	216
12	Evgeniy Garanichev (RUS)	22	0	27	54	20	40	22	—	12	17	214
13	Alexis Bœuf (FRA)	54	32	0	43	28	2	38	0	15	0	212
14	Anton Shipulin (RUS)	18	24	0	28	22	60	36	—	10	13	211
15	Tarjei Bø (NOR)	—	—	—	16	36	—	23	60	34	10	179
16	Arnd Peiffer (GER)	32	1	0	29	26	0	25	36	0	28	177
17	Andriy Deryzemlya (UKR)	26	0	0	0	32	0	24	48	24	22	176
18	Michal Šlesingr (CZE)	0	22	23	24	14	12	0	19	28	34	176
19	Ole Einar Bjørndalen (NOR)	7	25	20	31	—	—	43	23	0	24	173
20	Lukas Hofer (ITA)	0	13	21	0	18	18	27	20	0	54	171
21	Henrik L'Abée-Lund (NOR)	40	0	28	17	0	4	4	29	48	—	170
22	Tim Burke (USA)	23	19	43	15	—	0	13	9	13	32	167
23	Ondřej Moravec (CZE)	0	18	34	30	21	0	6	1	36	20	166
24	Andrei Makoveev (RUS)	1	38	14	23	48	20	—	0	—	18	162
25	Florian Graf (GER)	43	10	11	0	17	28	—	15	0	36	160
26	Klemen Bauer (SLO)	0	15	19	27	8	17	20	0	30	0	136
27	Simon Schempp (GER)	30	0	26	12	25	21	13	0	—	—	127
28	Daniel Mesotitsch (AUT)	16	—	—	—	—	34	8	32	4	29	123
29	Lowell Bailey (USA)	11	5	5	0	15	36	9	0	11	30	122
30	Dominik Windisch (ITA)	0	0	0	10	17	29	0	21	40	0	117
31	Björn Ferry (SWE)	25	9	25	—	0	7	28	—	19	0	113
32	Christoph Sumann (AUT)	48	0	15	—	0	—	—	—	0	43	106
33	Simon Fourcade (FRA)	—	—	—	11	0	0	7	38	31	19	106
34	Vladimir Iliev (BUL)	0	0	38	9	2	9	0	17	20	8	103
35	Friedrich Pinter (AUT)	21	43	0	0	6	32	—	0	0	0	102
36	Benjamin Weger (SUI)	9	0	6	32	9	0	16	0	0	27	99
37	Jean-Philippe Leguellec (CAN)	60	31	0	0	0	0	5	—	0	0	96
38	Vetle Sjåstad Christiansen (NOR)	14	26	—	—	—	—	—	—	23	31	94
39	Krasimir Anev (BUL)	0	21	0	18	0	0	30	12	6	0	87
40	Serhiy Semenov (UKR)	0	28	14	19	0	23	0	—	0	3	87
41	Carl Johan Bergman (SWE)	0	36	12	1	23	0	0	—	0	14	86
42	Andrejs Rastorgujevs (LAT)	4	12	3	—	10	0	0	31	25	0	85
43	Aleksey Volkov (RUS)	13	0	—	38	3	—	—	27	—	0	81
44	Julian Eberhard (AUT)	—	0	29	34	1	3	0	7	0	0	74
45	Alexandr Loginov (RUS)	—	—	—	—	—	—	—	40	29	—	69
46	Zdeněk Vítek (CZE)	7	23	0	—	—	0	17	22	0	0	69
47	Christian De Lorenzi (ITA)	0	8	0	—	7	15	15	16	8	0	69
48	Simon Desthieux (FRA)	0	4	16	22	0	—	0	14	9	0	65
49	Jaroslav Soukup (CZE)	—	—	—	0	13	31	14	3	3	0	64
50	Serguei Sednev (UKR)	24	0	18	7	0	12	2	—	0	0	63
51	Alexey Slepov (RUS)	—	—	—	—	—	0	—	—	32	26	58
52	Matej Kazar (SVK)	0	20	2	0	0	19	11	0	0	5	57
53	Yan Savitskiy (KAZ)	0	—	0	14	0	25	0	—	0	16	55
54	Scott Perras (CAN)	0	16	7	—	31	0	0	0	0	0	54
55	Erlend Bjøntegaard (NOR)	28	0	—	6	4	0	—	11	0	—	49
56	Lars Helge Birkeland (NOR)	—	0	0	—	38	10	—	0	—	—	48
57	Lars Berger (NOR)	17	—	31	0	0	—	—	—	—	—	48
58	Artem Pryma (UKR)	0	3	22	0	—	—	0	—	0	23	48
59	Daniel Böhm (GER)	—	—	—	—	—	—	—	24	—	15	39
60	Simon Hallenbarter (SWI)	0	34	0	4	0	0	0	0	—	—	38
61	Johannes Thingnes Bø (NOR)	—	—	—	—	—	—	—	13	21	4	38
62	Maxim Tsvetkov (RUS)	—	—	—	—	—	—	—	34	0	—	34
63	Claudio Böckli (SUI)	0	0	17	0	11	0	0	0	0	0	28
64	Mario Dolder (SUI)	0	0	11	0	0	16	0	—	0	0	27
65	Tomas Kaukėnas (LTU)	0	0	0	—	—	—	19	—	0	7	26
66	Johannes Kühn (GER)	—	—	24	0	0	0	—	—	—	—	24
67	Olexander Bilanenko (UKR)	10	0	—	4	5	0	—	5	0	—	24
68	Indrek Tobreluts (EST)	—	0	0	—	—	22	0	0	0	0	22
69	Markus Windisch (ITA)	0	0	—	21	—	—	—	—	—	—	21
70	Tobias Eberhard (AUT)	—	—	—	0	—	—	—	—	17	0	17
71	Jarkko Kauppinen (FIN)	0	0	0	0	0	14	3	0	0	—	17
72	Christoffer Eriksson (SWE)	15	0	0	0	0	0	0	—	0	0	15
73	Magnús Jónsson (SWE)	0	0	8	—	0	5	—	—	—	—	13
74	Benedikt Doll (GER)	—	6	—	—	—	—	—	—	7	0	13
75	Scott Gow (CAN)	—	—	0	—	12	0	0	0	0	0	12
76	Kauri Kõiv (EST)	0	0	—	0	0	0	10	0	0	0	10
77	Ivan Tcherezov (RUS)	—	—	0	—	—	—	—	10	—	—	10
78	Dušan Šimočko (SVK)	—	—	0	0	0	0	—	8	0	0	8
79	Ahti Toivanen (FIN)	8	0	0	—	0	0	0	0	0	0	8
80	Milanko Petrović (SRB)	—	—	0	2	0	0	0	0	6	0	8
81	Evgeny Abramenko (BLR)	0	0	0	0	0	0	0	7	0	0	7
82	Leif Nordgren (USA)	0	0	—	5	0	1	0	0	1	0	7
83	Christoph Stephan (GER)	—	—	—	—	—	—	—	—	0	6	6
84	Ivan Joller (SUI)	—	—	—	—	—	—	—	4	0	1	5
85	Miroslav Matiaško (SVK)	0	0	4	—	—	0	0	0	0	—	4
86	Danil Steptsenko (EST)	3	—	0	—	0	—	0	0	—	—	3
87	Pietro Dutto (ITA)	2	0	0	0	0	0	—	0	0	0	2
88	Pavol Hurajt (SVK)	—	0	—	—	0	—	0	—	0	2	2
89	Vincent Jay (FRA)	0	2	—	—	—	—	—	—	—	—	2
90	Vit Janov (CZE)	—	—	—	—	—	—	—	—	2	0	2
91	Edgars Piksons (LAT)	0	0	—	0	—	—	1	0	—	0	1
