= Biathlon World Championships 2013 – Men's mass start =

Men's mass start at the Biathlon World Championships 2013
- Date: 17 February 2013
- Competitors: 30 from 14 nations
- Winning time: 36:15.8

Medalists
gold medal	Tarjei Bø	Norway
silver medal	Anton Shipulin	Russia
bronze medal	Emil Hegle Svendsen	Norway

The Men's mass start event of the Biathlon World Championships 2013 was held on February 17, 2013. 30 athletes participated over a course of 15 km.

== Results ==
The race was started at 15:00.

Rank	Bib	Name	Nationality	Time	Penalties (P+P+S+S)	Deficit
1st place, gold medalist(s)	19	Tarjei Bø	Norway	36:15.8	0 (0+0+0+0)	
2nd place, silver medalist(s)	5	Anton Shipulin	Russia	36:19.5	1 (0+0+1+0)	+3.7
3rd place, bronze medalist(s)	1	Emil Hegle Svendsen	Norway	36:23.2	1 (0+1+0+0)	+7.4
4	14	Ondřej Moravec	Czech Republic	36:26.2	1 (0+0+1+0)	+10.4
5	21	Erik Lesser	Germany	36:28.6	1 (1+0+0+0)	+12.8
6	12	Dominik Landertinger	Austria	36:32.5	1 (0+0+1+0)	+16.7
7	15	Jean-Guillaume Béatrix	France	36:35.4	2 (1+0+1+0)	+19.6
8	16	Björn Ferry	Sweden	36:38.3	0 (0+0+0+0)	+22.5
9	20	Simon Fourcade	France	36:52.1	2 (1+0+1+0)	+36.3
10	2	Martin Fourcade	France	36:52.6	2 (0+1+0+1)	+36.8
11	10	Andreas Birnbacher	Germany	36:53.0	2 (1+0+0+1)	+37.2
12	6	Fredrik Lindtsröm	Sweden	37:15.2	2 (1+0+0+1)	+59.4
13	26	Lowell Bailey	United States	37:25.2	2 (0+0+0+2)	+1:09.4
14	30	Simon Schempp	Germany	37:25.9	3 (1+1+1+0)	+1:10.1
15	7	Dmitry Malyshko	Russia	37:30.2	3 (1+0+1+1)	+1:14.4
16	8	Evgeny Ustyugov	Russia	37.35.0	3 (1+1+0+1)	+1:19.2
17	25	Henrik L'Abée-Lund	Norway	37:41.9	3 (0+0+2+1)	+1:26.1
18	13	Simon Eder	Austria	37:48.4	2 (1+0+0+1)	+1:32.6
19	4	Jakov Fak	Slovenia	38:02.8	4 (0+2+0+2)	+1:47.0
20	23	Andriy Deryzemlya	Ukraine	38:03.3	4 (1+0+3+0)	+1:47.5
21	17	Lukas Hofer	Italy	38:08.7	3 (3+0+0+0)	+1.52.9
22	22	Jean-Philippe Leguellec	Canada	38:17.5	3 (0+0+1+2)	+2:01.7
23	24	Arnd Peiffer	Germany	38.24.7	2 (0+2+0+0)	+2:08.9
24	18	Ole Einar Bjørndalen	Norway	38:28.0	6 (1+1+2+2)	+2.12.2
25	9	Evgeniy Garanichev	Russia	38:28.1	5 (1+1+1+2)	+2:12.3
26	29	Klemen Bauer	Slovenia	38:44.1	4 (0+0+2+2)	+2:28.3
27	27	Benjamin Weger	Switzerland	38.55.9	3 (1+0+2+0)	+2:40.1
28	11	Alexis Bœuf	France	39.23.4	2 (0+0+2+0)	+3:07.6
29	28	Tomas Kaukėnas	Lithuania	39:58.9	3 (0+1+1+1)	+3:43.1
30	3	Tim Burke	United States	41:15.5	5 (2+3+0+0)	+4:59.7
