= Łukasz Słonina =

Polish biathlete

Personal information
- Born: 5 June 1989 (age 36); Wałbrzych, Poland
- Height: 183 cm (6 ft 0 in)
- Weight: 68 kg (150 lb)

Sport
- Sport: Biathlon
- Club: AZS AWF Wrocław

Łukasz Słonina (born 5 June 1989) is a Polish biathlete. He competed at the Biathlon World Championships 2013 in Nové Město na Moravě, in sprint and relay. He competed at the 2014 Winter Olympics in Sochi, in the individual contest.
