= Miroslav Kenanov =

Bulgarian biathlete (born 1988)

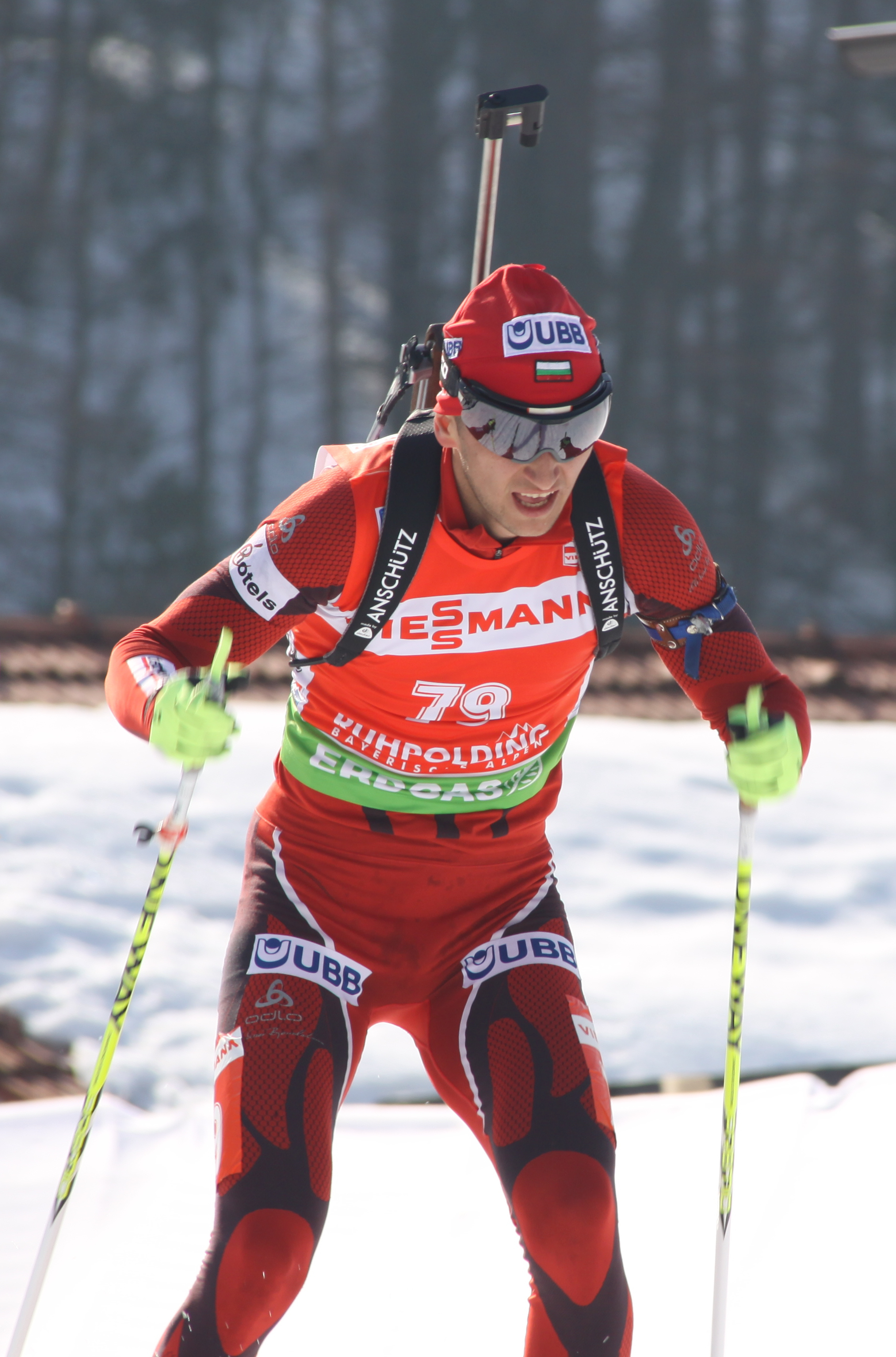

Personal information
- Born: 20 April 1988 (age 38) Samokov, Bulgaria

Sport
- Sport: Skiing
- Updated on 28 February 2013

Miroslav Kenanov (Bulgarian: Мирослав Ҝенонав); born 20 April 1988 in Samokov) is a Bulgarian biathlete.

Kenanov competed in the 2010 Winter Olympics for Bulgaria. His best performance was 16th, as part of the Bulgarian relay team. He also finished 82nd in the sprint.

As of February 2013, his best performance at the Biathlon World Championships, is 9th, as part of the 2013 Bulgarian men's relay team. His best individual performance is 61st, in the 2012 sprint.

As of February 2013, his best Biathlon World Cup finish is 11th, as part of the Bulgarian men's relay team at Hochfilzen during the 2010/11 season. His best individual finish is 49th, in the sprint at Hochfilzen in 2011/12.

As of February 2014, his best performance at the Olympic games is 75th in the men's 20 km individual sprint at Sochi . This is his best finish at the Olympic winter games in his career.
