= Ivan Joller =

Swiss biathlete (born 1983)

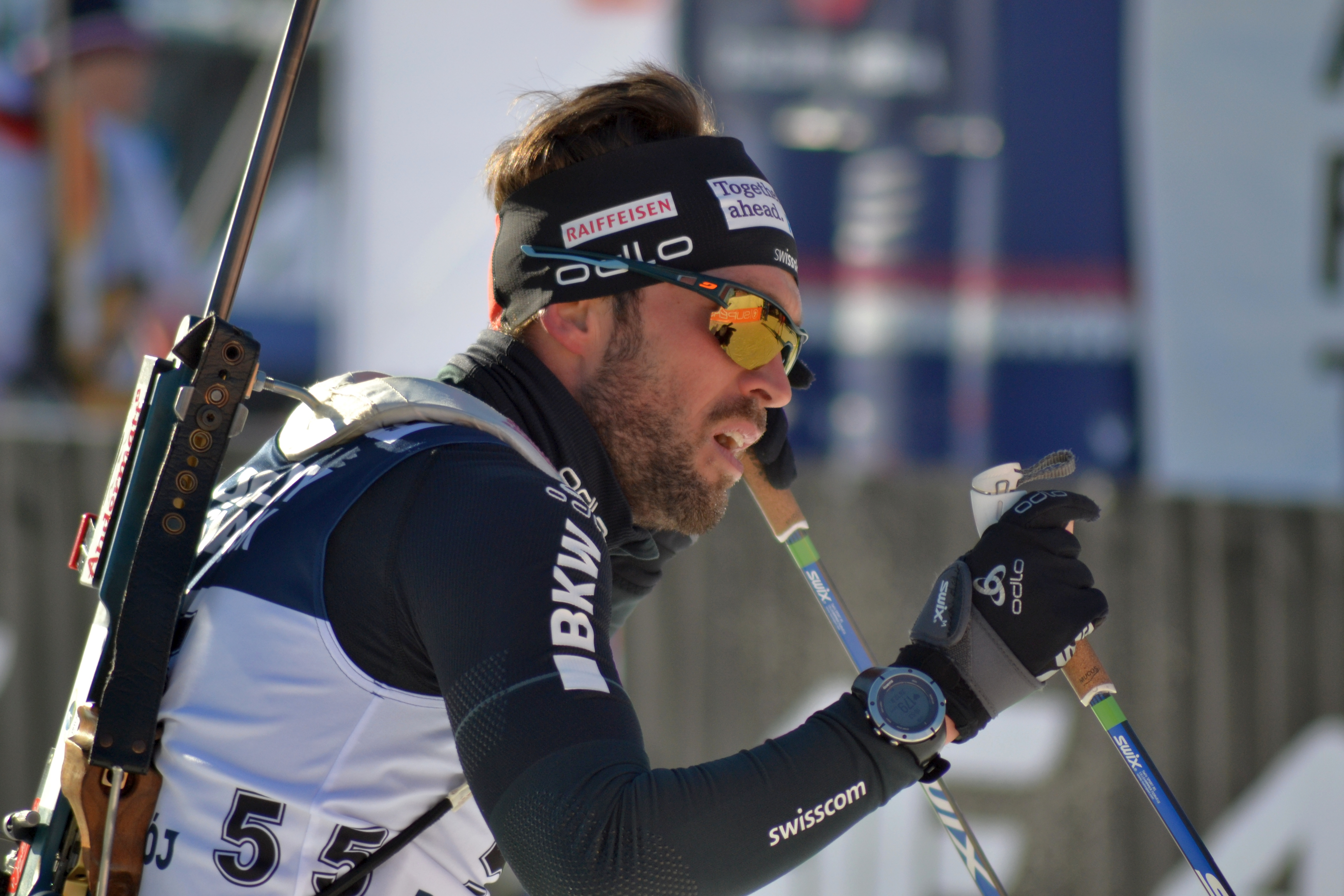
- Joller in 2017

Personal information
- Nationality: Swiss
- Born: 24 April 1983 (age 41)

Sport
- Sport: Biathlon

Ivan Joller (born 24 April 1983) is a Swiss former biathlete. He competed at the Biathlon World Championships 2012 in Ruhpolding and at the Biathlon World Championships 2013 in Nové Město na Moravě. He competed at the 2014 Winter Olympics in Sochi, in the individual contest.
