= Emir Hrkalović =

Serbian biathlete

Personal information
- Full name: Emir Hrkalović
- Born: 17 May 1991 (age 35)

Sport
- Sport: Skiing
- Club: Sjenica Biathlon Club

World Cup career
- Seasons: 2012-
- Indiv. podiums: 0
- Indiv. wins: 0
- Updated on 9 February 2013

Emir Hrkalović (Serbian: Емир Хркаловћ; born 17 May 1991) is a Serbian biathlete.

He represents Serbia at the Biathlon World Championships, Biathlon World Cup and IBU Cup.

The best result in his career so far is 10th place in 20 km individual during the 2nd stage of 2013/14 IBU Cup held in Beitostolen, Norway.
