= Oskars Muižnieks =

Latvian biathlete (born 1989)

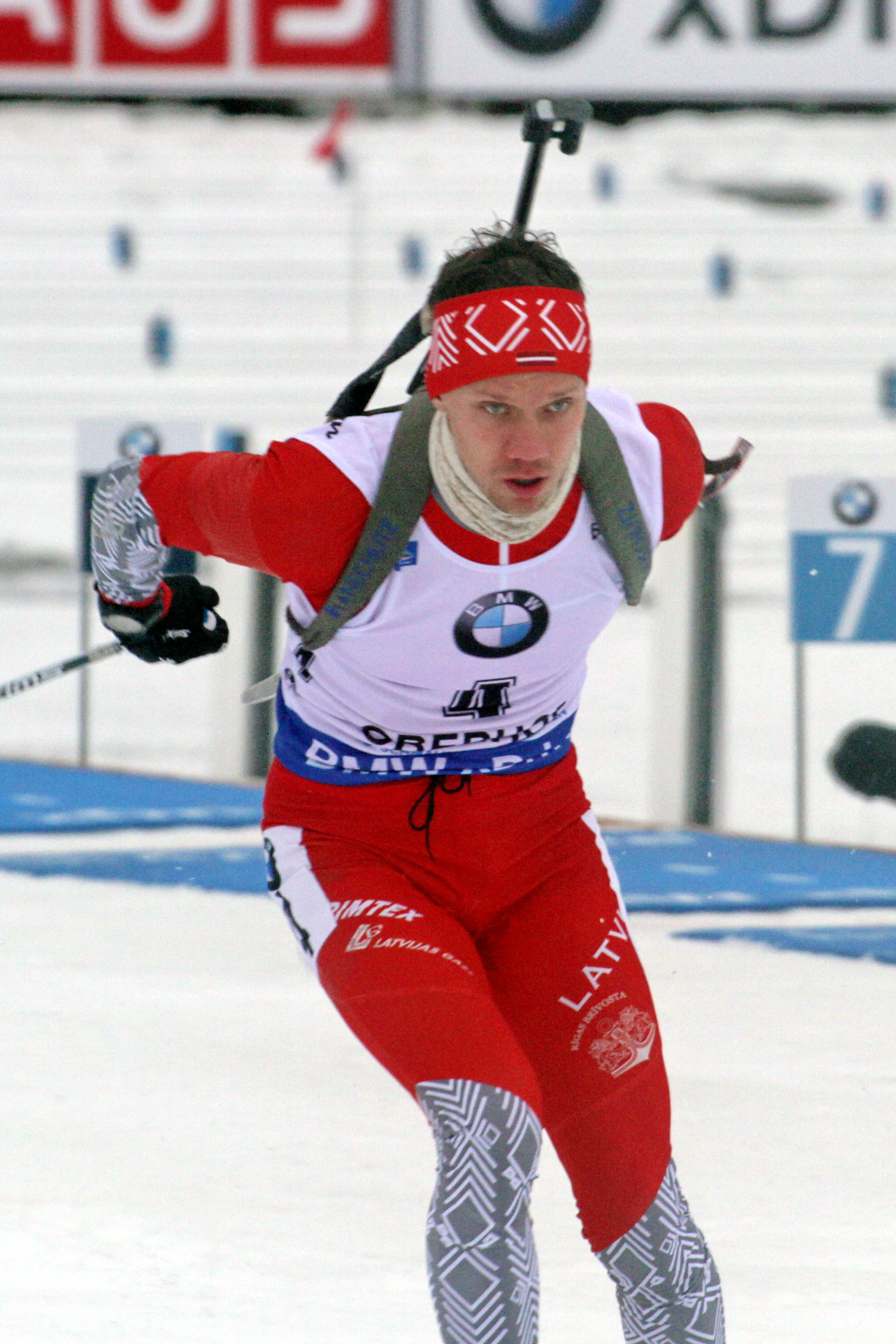
- Muižnieks in 2018

Personal information
- Nationality: Latvian
- Born: 9 December 1989 (age 35); Jūrmala, Latvian SSR

Sport
- Sport: Biathlon

Oskars Muižnieks (born 9 December 1989) is a Latvian biathlete and mountain biker. He competed in the 2018 Winter Olympics.

== Biathlon results ==
All results are sourced from the International Biathlon Union.

=== Olympic Games ===
0 medals

Event	Individual	Sprint	Pursuit	Mass start	Relay	Mixed relay
(South Korea) 2018 Pyeongchang	42nd	66th	—	—	—	—
