= Andreas Birnbacher =

German biathlete (born 1981)

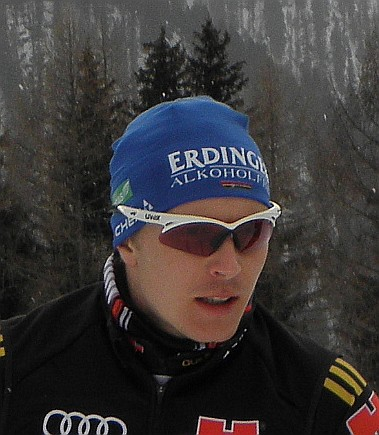
- Birnbacher in Antholz-Anterselva in 2010.

Personal information
- Full name: Andreas Birnbacher
- Nicknames: Andi; Birnei
- Born: 11 September 1981 (age 44) Prien am Chiemsee, West Germany
- Height: 1.79 m (5 ft 10 in)
- Website: andibirnbacher.de

Sport

Professional information
- Sport: Biathlon
- Club: SC Schleching
- World Cup debut: 18 January 2001
- Retired: 10 March 2016

Olympic Games
- Teams: 2 (2010, 2014)
- Medals: 0

World Championships
- Teams: 9 (2004, 2005, 2006, 2007, 2008, 2011, 2012, 2013, 2016)
- Medals: 6 (1 gold)

World Cup
- Seasons: 16 (2000/01–2015/16)
- Individual victories: 6
- All victories: 7
- Individual podiums: 16
- All podiums: 36
- Discipline titles: 1: 1 Mass start (2011–12)
Medal record
Men's biathlon
Representing Germany
World Championships
Gold medal – first place	2008 Östersund	Mixed relay
Silver medal – second place	2007 Antholz-Anterselva	15 km mass start
Bronze medal – third place	2008 Östersund	4 × 7.5 km relay
Bronze medal – third place	2012 Ruhpolding	4 × 7.5 km relay
Bronze medal – third place	2012 Ruhpolding	Mixed relay
Bronze medal – third place	2013 Nové Město	4 × 7.5 km relay
Junior World Championships
Gold medal – first place	2000 Hochfilzen	4 × 7.5 km relay
Gold medal – first place	2001 Khanty-Mansiysk	10 km sprint
Gold medal – first place	2001 Khanty-Mansiysk	12.5 km pursuit
Gold medal – first place	2001 Khanty-Mansiysk	4 × 7.5 km relay
Silver medal – second place	2000 Hochfilzen	15 km individual
Silver medal – second place	2000 Hochfilzen	10 km sprint
Bronze medal – third place	2000 Hochfilzen	12.5 km pursuit

Andreas Birnbacher (born 11 September 1981) is a former German biathlete. His biggest successes were the silver medal in the mass start event at the 2007 World Championships and the gold medal in the mixed relay at the 2008 World Championships. He also won the bronze medal at the 2012 world championships in Ruhpolding when he was part of the German teams that finished third in the mixed relay and the men's relay.

== Life and career ==
=== 2011–2012 world cup season ===
Birnbacher's most successful biathlon world cup season was the 2011–2012 season. He had just come off the back of a strong end to the 2010/2011 season after taking his maiden win in the Oslo sprint. In the opening world cup race at Östersund, he finished 28th in the individual competition but placed 6th in the sprint and pursuit. Birnbacher's first win of the year came in the Hochfilzen (2) pursuit when he came through from 26th to win, hitting the perfect 20/20 score and denying Ole Einar Bjørndalen in a sprint finish. For Birnbacher, this win was the last race before the Christmas break.

Returning from the break, Birnbacher looked extremely strong in Oberhof. After a poor 24th in the sprint, he ran away with the mass start, hitting all 20 targets and finishing 24.3 seconds ahead of his nearest challenger. This victory completed a rout of the top step of the podium for Germany after Magdalena Neuner won both women's races and Arnd Peiffer won the men's sprint.

Birnbacher's strongest weekend of the season was Antholz-Anterselva. After finishing 4th in the sprint, he took win number 3 in the mass start with a penalty lap on shoot 3 proving to be a mere bump on the road to victory as he beat Anton Shipulin and Martin Fourcade by 0.1 and 0.3 seconds respectively. At that point in the season, Birnbacher sat 52 points off Fourcade and 27 pts behind Emil Hegle Svendsen of Norway.

World cup 7 took Birnbacher back to the site of his maiden win at the end of last year: Oslo Hollmenkollen. After reasonable sprint and pursuit performances Birnbacher, finished second in the mass start cleaning all 20 targets but not having the skiing speed of race winner Svendsen. Then any hopes of Birnbacher taking the overall crystal globe ended when the German coaches decided to rest him for Kontiolathi Finland so he could be prepared for the upcoming world championships.

The world championships were a mixed bag for Birnbacher. He won two bronze medals and finished 4th in the individual and mass start events. In the mixed relay, Birnbacher teamed up with Andrea Henkel, Magdalena Neuner and Arnd Peiffer; at the time the four of them combined had won 14 races. Birnbacher looked to have given Germany the win as he made no mistakes on the shooting range and the net result was a 1-minute advantage for Germany. Then Peiffer had a penalty loop on the standing shoot and Germany finished 3rd. His other medal came in the men's relay once again he teamed up with Peiffer but also with Simon Schempp and the returning Michael Greis. Birnbacher needed 2 spare rounds for the standing shoot but his strong skiing kept Germany in the running for Medals. The two bronze medals meant that for the first time in his career Birnbacher had picked up more than one medal from the world championships.

In the last race of the season, a 4th-place finish in the mass start meant Birnbacher clinched the mass start crystal globe thus picking up the German men's first Crystal globe since Michael Greis won the overall and sprint crystal globes in 2007. Birnbacher finished the year third overall on 837 points.

=== Retirement ===
Birnbacher announced his retirement on 8 March 2016 during the World Championships in Oslo. His last race was the 20 km individual on 10 March.

== Biathlon results ==
All results are sourced from the International Biathlon Union.

=== Olympic Games ===
Event	Individual	Sprint	Pursuit	Mass start	Relay	Mixed relay
(Canada) 2010 Vancouver	12th	23rd	13th	15th	5th	—N/a
(Russia) 2014 Sochi	22nd	—	—	—	—	—

*The mixed relay was added as an event in 2014.

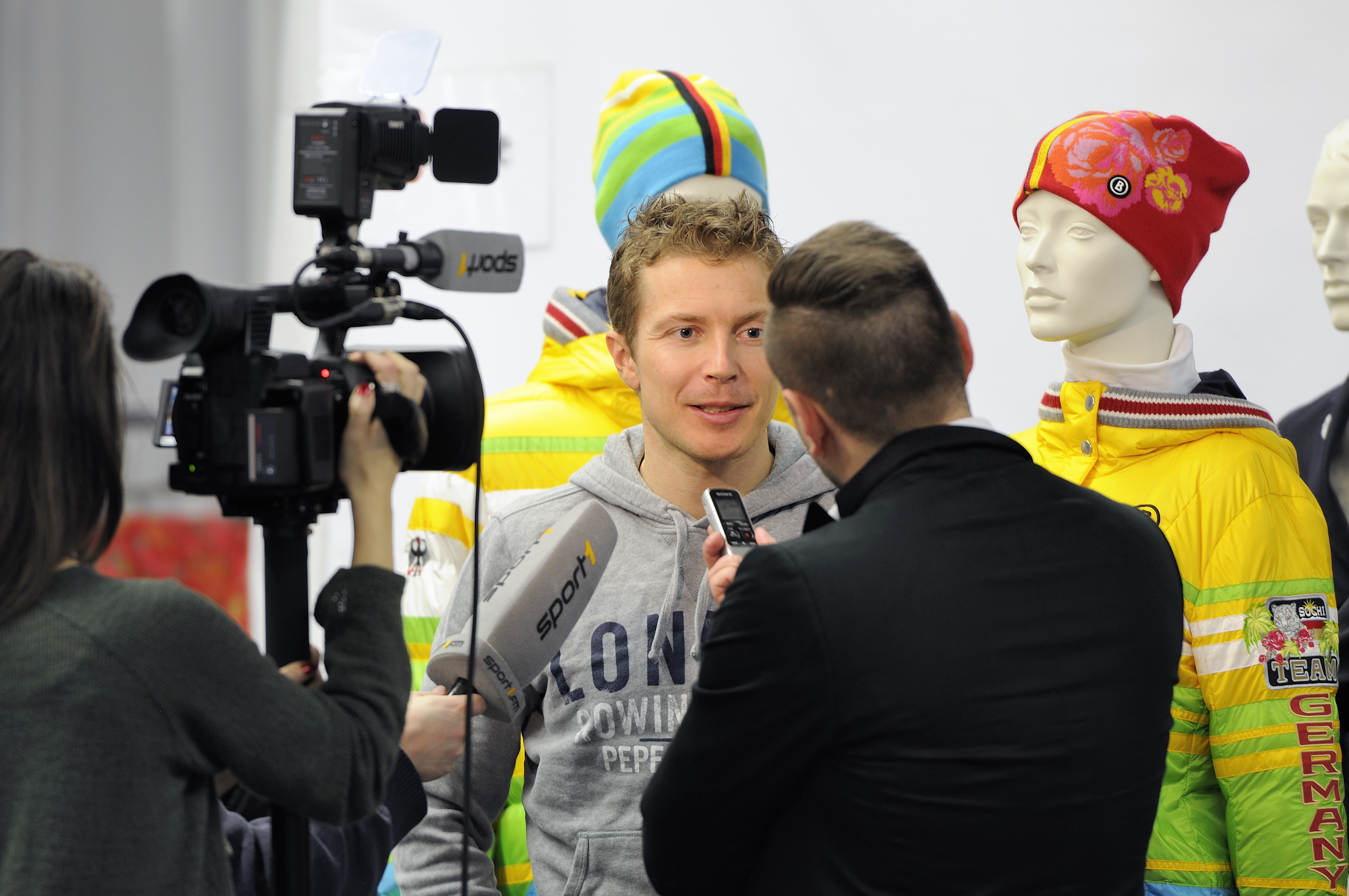
Andreas Birnbacher interviewed.

=== World Championships ===
6 medals (1 gold, 1 silver, 4 bronze)

Event	Individual	Sprint	Pursuit	Mass start	Relay	Mixed relay
(Germany) 2004 Oberhof	14th	—	—	—	—	—N/a
(Austria) 2005 Hochfilzen	—	56th	DNS	—	—	—
(Slovenia) 2006 Pokljuka	—N/a	—N/a	—N/a	—N/a	—N/a	4th
(Italy) 2007 Antholz-Anterselva	19th	17th	13th	Silver	—	—
(Sweden) 2008 Östersund	—	8th	21st	16th	Bronze	Gold
(Russia) 2011 Khanty-Mansiysk	8th	6th	5th	16th	7th	—
(Germany) 2012 Ruhpolding	4th	16th	12th	4th	Bronze	Bronze
(Czech Republic) 2013 Nové Město	8th	23rd	22nd	11th	Bronze	13th
(Norway) 2016 Oslo Holmenkollen	9th	—	—	—	—	—

*During Olympic seasons competitions are only held for those events not included in the Olympic program.
**The mixed relay was added as an event in 2005.

=== World Cup ===
Season	Overall		Individual		Sprint		Pursuit		Mass start	
Season	Points	Position	Points	Position	Points	Position	Points	Position	Points	Position
2000–01	0	—N/a	0	—N/a	0	—N/a	0	—N/a	0	—N/a
2001–02	42	54th	0	—N/a	24	46th	18	51st	0	—N/a
2002–03	70	46th	9	46th	27	47th	34	37th	0	—N/a
2003–04	172	29th	44	16th	38	43rd	72	26th	18	34th
2004–05	169	30th	34	25th	55	34th	64	26th	16	35th
2005–06	371	17th	34	21st	133	18th	122	13th	90	18th
2006–07	514	13th	58	15th	181	12th	144	16th	131	8th
2007–08	481	10th	28	31st	194	6th	166	8th	90	15th
2008–09	314	27th	27	50th	142	24th	82	27th	63	29th
2009–10	479	15th	58	24th	170	16th	112	15th	123	15th
2010–11	549	14th	93	10th	219	9th	142	13th	95	19th
2011–12	837	3rd	90	8th	248	8th	239	6th	260	1st
2012–13	691	5th	104	2nd	243	6th	181	10th	163	4th
2013–14	171	41st	3	56th	29	56th	96	33rd	43	26th
2014–15	406	24th	36	28th	161	23rd	130	21st	79	23rd
2015–16	421	19th	87	6th	85	38th	164	16th	85	22nd

=== Individual victories ===
6 victories (2 Sp, 1 Pu, 3 MS)

Season	Date	Location	Discipline	Level
2010–11; 1 victory (1 Sp)	17 March 2011	(Norway) Oslo Holmenkollen	10 km sprint	Biathlon World Cup
2011–12; 3 victories (1 Pu, 2 MS)	17 December 2011	(Austria) Hochfilzen	12.5 km pursuit	Biathlon World Cup
2011–12; 3 victories (1 Pu, 2 MS)	8 January 2012	(Germany) Oberhof	15 km mass start	Biathlon World Cup
2011–12; 3 victories (1 Pu, 2 MS)	21 January 2012	(Italy) Antholz-Anterselva	15 km mass start	Biathlon World Cup
2012–13; 2 victories (1 Sp, 1 MS)	7 December 2012	(Austria) Hochfilzen	10 km sprint	Biathlon World Cup
2012–13; 2 victories (1 Sp, 1 MS)	16 December 2012	(Slovenia) Pokljuka	15 km mass start	Biathlon World Cup

*Results are from UIPMB and IBU races which include the Biathlon World Cup, Biathlon World Championships and the Winter Olympic Games.
