= Ahti Toivanen =

Finnish biathlete

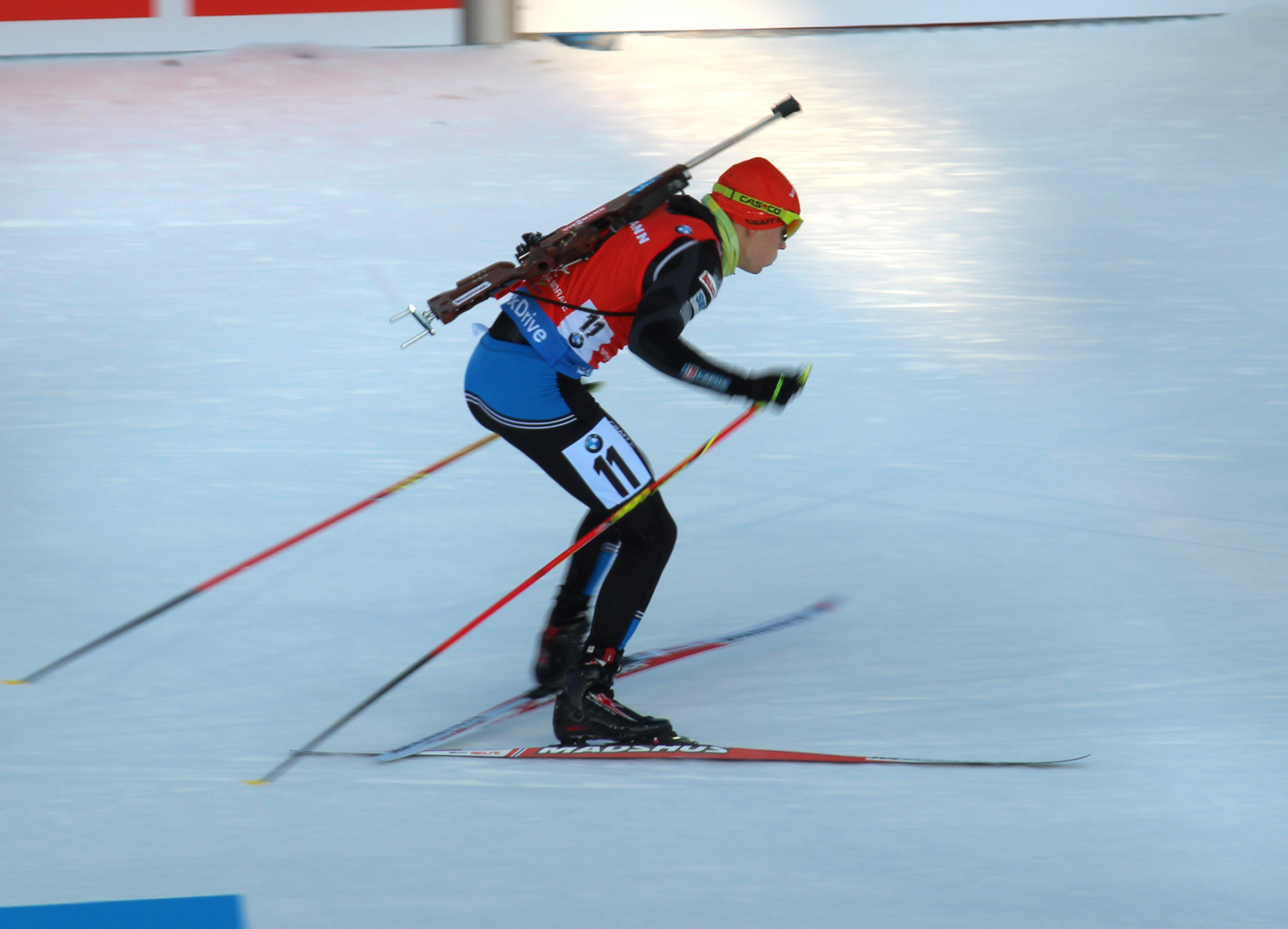
- Ahti Toivanen, Nové Město 2015

Personal information
- Nationality: Finnish
- Born: 5 January 1990 (age 35); Polvijärvi, Pohjois-Karjala, Finland
- Height: 182 cm (6 ft 0 in)
- Weight: 74 kg (163 lb)

Sport
- Sport: Biathlon

Ahti Toivanen (born 5 January 1990) is a Finnish biathlete. He was born in Polvijarvi. He competed at the Biathlon World Championships 2011, 2012 and 2013, and at the 2014 Winter Olympics in Sochi, in sprint and individual.
