= Peter Dokl =

Slovenian biathlete (born 1985)

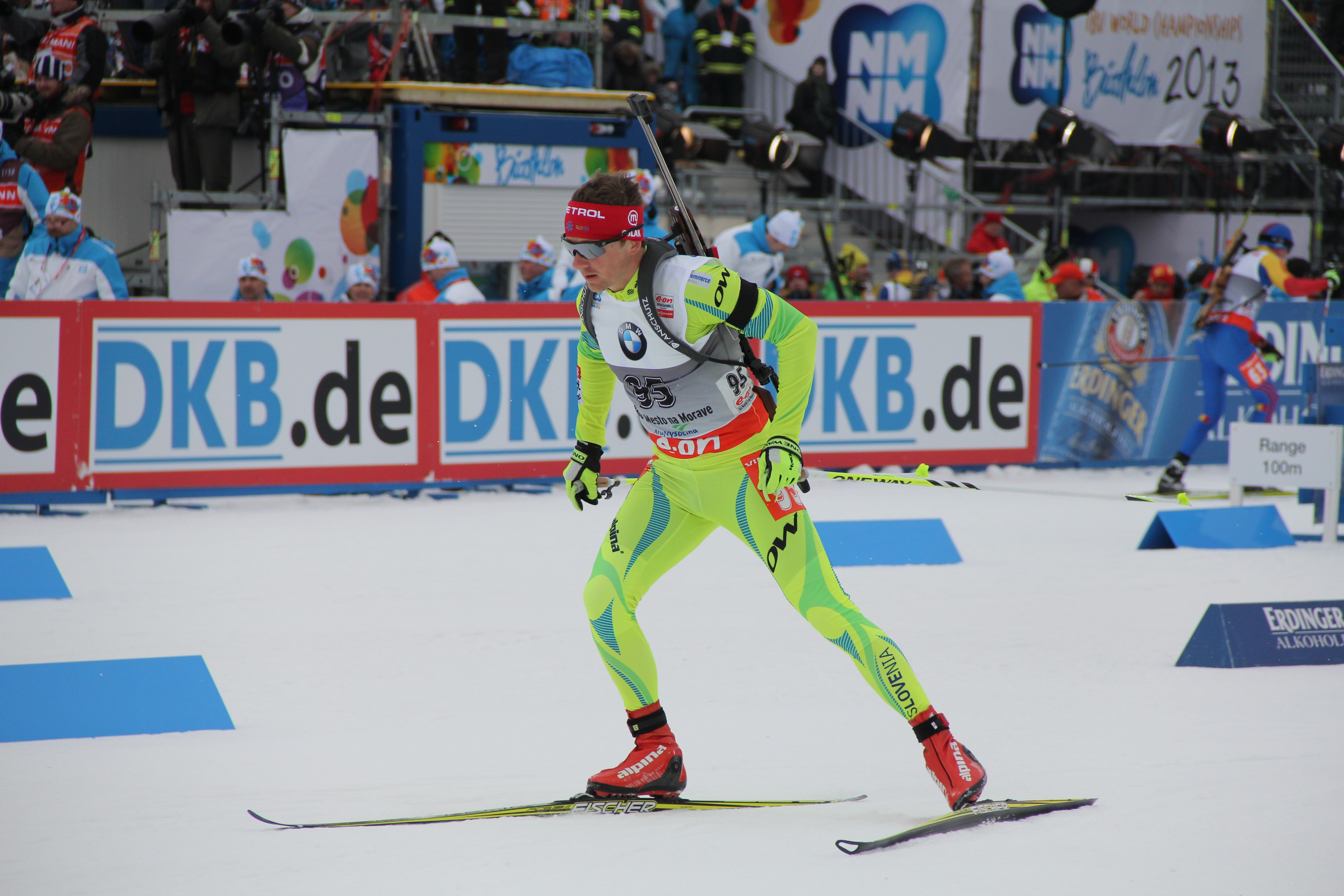

Personal information
- Born: 11 January 1985 (age 41)

Sport

Professional information
- Sport: Biathlon
Medal record
Youth World Championships
Silver medal – second place	2004 Haute Maurienne	12.5 km individual
Bronze medal – third place	2004 Haute Maurienne	3 × 7.5 km relay

Peter Dokl (born 11 January 1985) is a Slovenian biathlete.

Dokl represented Slovenia at the 2010 Winter Olympics.
