= Edgars Piksons =

Latvian biathlete (born 1983)

Personal information
- Full name: Edgars Piksons
- Born: 17 July 1983 (age 42) Cēsis, Latvian SSR, Soviet Union
- Height: 1.78 m (5 ft 10 in)

Sport

Professional information
- Sport: Biathlon
- World Cup debut: 10 January 2001

Olympic Games
- Teams: 2 (2006, 2010)
- Medals: 0

World Championships
- Teams: 7 (2005, 2007, 2008, 2009, 2011, 2012, 2013)
- Medals: 0

World Cup
- Seasons: 14 (2000/01–2013/14)
- All podiums: 0
Medal record
Men's biathlon
Representing Latvia
European Championships
Silver medal – second place	2006 Langdorf-Arbersee	12.5 km pursuit
Summer European Championships
Silver medal – second place	2006 Cēsis	Mixed relay
Bronze medal – third place	2006 Cēsis	6 km mass start
Junior European Championships
Bronze medal – third place	2002 Kontiolahti	4 × 7.5 km relay
Junior Summer World Championships
Gold medal – first place	2003 Forni Avoltri	3 × 4 km relay
Gold medal – first place	2004 Brezno-Osrblie	4 km sprint
Gold medal – first place	2004 Brezno-Osrblie	6 km pursuit
Silver medal – second place	2000 Khanty-Mansiysk	6 km sprint
Silver medal – second place	2000 Khanty-Mansiysk	3 × 6 km relay
Silver medal – second place	2004 Brezno-Osrblie	3 × 4 km relay
Bronze medal – third place	2003 Forni Avoltri	6 km mass start

Edgars Piksons (born 17 July 1983) is a former Latvian biathlete. He represented Latvia at the 2006 and 2010 Winter Olympics. At Biathlon World Championships 2011 he got 8th place in the sprint.

In November 2014, the news broke that Piksons had tested positive for the banned substance 19-Norandrosterone after a practice competition in Priekuļi on 22 September. He waived the right to have a B-sample tested. Piksons denied having knowingly taken any banned substances, but announced his retirement from professional sports.
