= Claudio Böckli =

Swiss biathlete (born 1984)

Personal information
- Nationality: Swiss
- Born: 20 June 1984 (age 40)

Sport
- Sport: Biathlon

Claudio Böckli (born 20 June 1984) is a Swiss retired biathlete. He competed at the Biathlon World Championships 2012 in Ruhpolding and at the Biathlon World Championships 2013 in Nové Město na Moravě. He competed at the 2014 Winter Olympics in Sochi, in the individual contest.
