= Emil Hegle Svendsen =

Norwegian biathlete (born 1985)

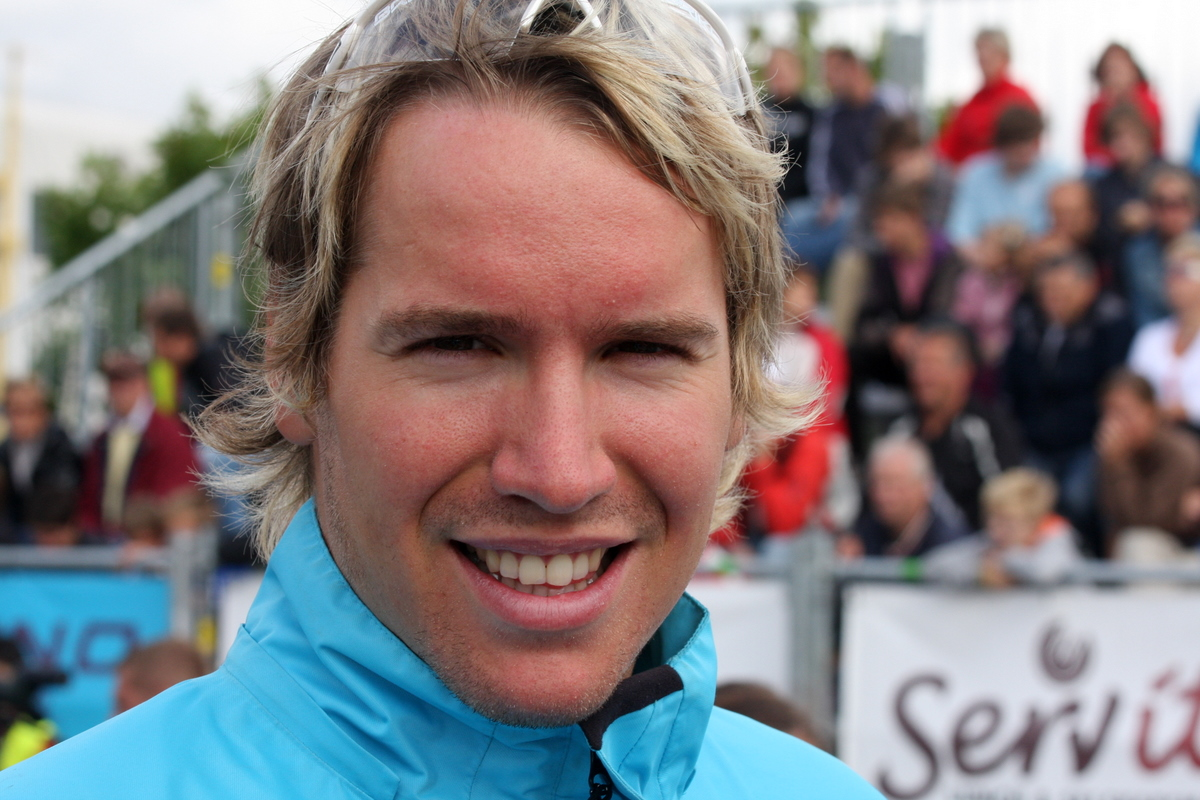
- Emil Hegle Svendsen in 2009

Personal information
- Nickname: Super-Svendsen
- Born: 12 July 1985 (age 41) Trondheim, Norway
- Height: 1.85 m (6 ft 1 in)

Sport

Professional information
- Sport: Biathlon
- Club: Trondhjems Skiskyttere
- World Cup debut: 15 December 2005

Olympic Games
- Teams: 4 (2006, 2010, 2014, 2018)
- Medals: 9 (4 gold)

World Championships
- Teams: 9 (2007, 2008, 2009, 2010, 2011, 2012, 2013, 2015, 2016)
- Medals: 21 (12 gold)

World Cup
- Seasons: 11 (2005/06–2017/18)
- Individual victories: 37
- All victories: 58
- Individual podiums: 79
- All podiums: 115
- Overall titles: 1 (2009–10)
- Discipline titles: 4: 2 Individual (2010–11, 2013–14); 1 Sprint (2009–10); 1 Mass start (2010–11)
Medal record
Event	1st	2nd	3rd
Olympic Games	4	3	2
World Championships	12	6	3
Junior/Youth World Championships	2	1	2
Total	18	8	7
Olympic Games
Gold medal – first place	2010 Vancouver	20 km individual
Gold medal – first place	2010 Vancouver	4 × 7.5 km relay
Gold medal – first place	2014 Sochi	15 km mass start
Gold medal – first place	2014 Sochi	Mixed relay
Silver medal – second place	2010 Vancouver	10 km sprint
Silver medal – second place	2018 Pyeongchang	4 × 7.5 km relay
Silver medal – second place	2018 Pyeongchang	Mixed relay
Bronze medal – third place	2014 Sochi	4 × 7.5 km relay
Bronze medal – third place	2018 Pyeongchang	15 km mass start
World Championships
Gold medal – first place	2008 Östersund	20 km individual
Gold medal – first place	2008 Östersund	15 km mass start
Gold medal – first place	2009 Pyeongchang	4 × 7.5 km relay
Gold medal – first place	2011 Khanty-Mansiysk	15 km mass start
Gold medal – first place	2011 Khanty-Mansiysk	4 × 7.5 km relay
Gold medal – first place	2012 Ruhpolding	4 × 7.5 km relay
Gold medal – first place	2012 Ruhpolding	Mixed relay
Gold medal – first place	2013 Nové Mesto	10 km sprint
Gold medal – first place	2013 Nové Mesto	12.5 km pursuit
Gold medal – first place	2013 Nové Mesto	4 × 7.5 km relay
Gold medal – first place	2013 Nové Mesto	Mixed relay
Gold medal – first place	2016 Oslo	4 × 7.5 km relay
Silver medal – second place	2008 Östersund	4 × 7.5 km relay
Silver medal – second place	2010 Khanty-Mansiysk	Mixed relay
Silver medal – second place	2011 Khanty-Mansiysk	12.5 km pursuit
Silver medal – second place	2012 Ruhpolding	10 km sprint
Silver medal – second place	2015 Kontiolathi	20 km individual
Silver medal – second place	2015 Kontiolahti	4 × 7.5 km relay
Bronze medal – third place	2007 Antholz-Anterselva	Mixed relay
Bronze medal – third place	2013 Nové Mesto	15 km mass start
Bronze medal – third place	2016 Oslo	12.5 km pursuit
Junior World Championships
Gold medal – first place	2005 Kontiolahti	15 km individual
Gold medal – first place	2005 Kontiolahti	10 km sprint
Silver medal – second place	2005 Kontiolahti	12.5 km pursuit
Youth World Championships
Gold medal – first place	2004 Haute Maurienne	10 km pursuit
Gold medal – first place	2004 Haute Maurienne	3 × 7.5 km relay
Bronze medal – third place	2003 Kościelisko	12.5 km individual
Bronze medal – third place	2003 Kościelisko	10 km pursuit
Men's cross-country skiing
Junior World Championships
Silver medal – second place	2005 Rovaniemi	4 × 10 km relay
Bronze medal – third place	2005 Rovaniemi	10 km freestyle
- Updated on 23 February 2018

Emil Hegle Svendsen (born 12 July 1985) is a retired Norwegian biathlete. He has won nine medals at Winter Olympics (four gold) and five individual gold medals and seven relay gold medals at World Championships.

He skis with Trondhjems Skiskyttere, based in his hometown Trondheim.

== Career ==
The 2005–06 season was Svendsen's first season on the World Cup tour. Previously, he had competed as a junior in the European Cup, now known as the IBU cup. During his first season in the World Cup, Svendsen finished fifth in three races, two of them in sprints (Brezno-Osrblie and Ruhpolding), and the other in a mass start (Holmenkollen). He also finished races in seventh, ninth, and four more within the top twenty (14th, 15th, 17th, 19th). He finished the overall season in 22nd place. He was 32nd in the pursuit, 21st in the sprint, and 7th in the mass start, only seven points behind Sven Fischer in fourth place.

Svendsen was selected for the Olympics, to compete in the mass start, in which he came sixth, after hitting 18/20 targets and finished 53.8 seconds behind winner Michael Greis of Germany. As a junior, Svendsen won four gold medals in junior World Championships, his first and second gold was in the pursuit, and the relay in Haute Maurienne in 2004, and the third and fourth gold in the individual and the sprint in Kontiolahti in 2005. He also has two bronze medals from the individual and the pursuit in Kościelisko in 2003. During his three seasons in the European Cup, Svendsen won two races (individual and pursuit), one second place (sprint), and came third three times (all in the sprint).

For his first season in the World Cup Svendsen had an 82% shooting average, making him the 42nd best shot of the tour, but the same shooting percentage as Halvard Hanevold and Vincent Defrasne. He hit 243 out of 295 targets. He shot both 82% in his prone and standing shoot, he averaged 70% in the individual, 84% in the sprint, 81% in the pursuit, 87% in the mass start, and 76% in the relay.

On 13 December 2007, Svendsen took his first world cup victory, at the 20 km in Pokljuka. However, his big breakthrough came when he won two individual gold medals at the 2008 World Championships, winning both the individual and the mass start ahead of Ole Einar Bjørndalen. He went on winning more victories and podiums for the rest of the season, and eventually finished third overall.

The 2008/2009 season started off well for Svendsen. By placing on the podium in every one of the first five races, he took the lead in the overall world cup. After the Christmas holiday however, Svendsen struggled to maintain the early season's results, and when he fell ill during the world championships and did not compete in several races, he lost the overall lead. After a couple of middle placings, he returned with a third place at the mass start event in Trondheim, and a fourth place and a victory in Khanty Mansiysk the consecutive week.

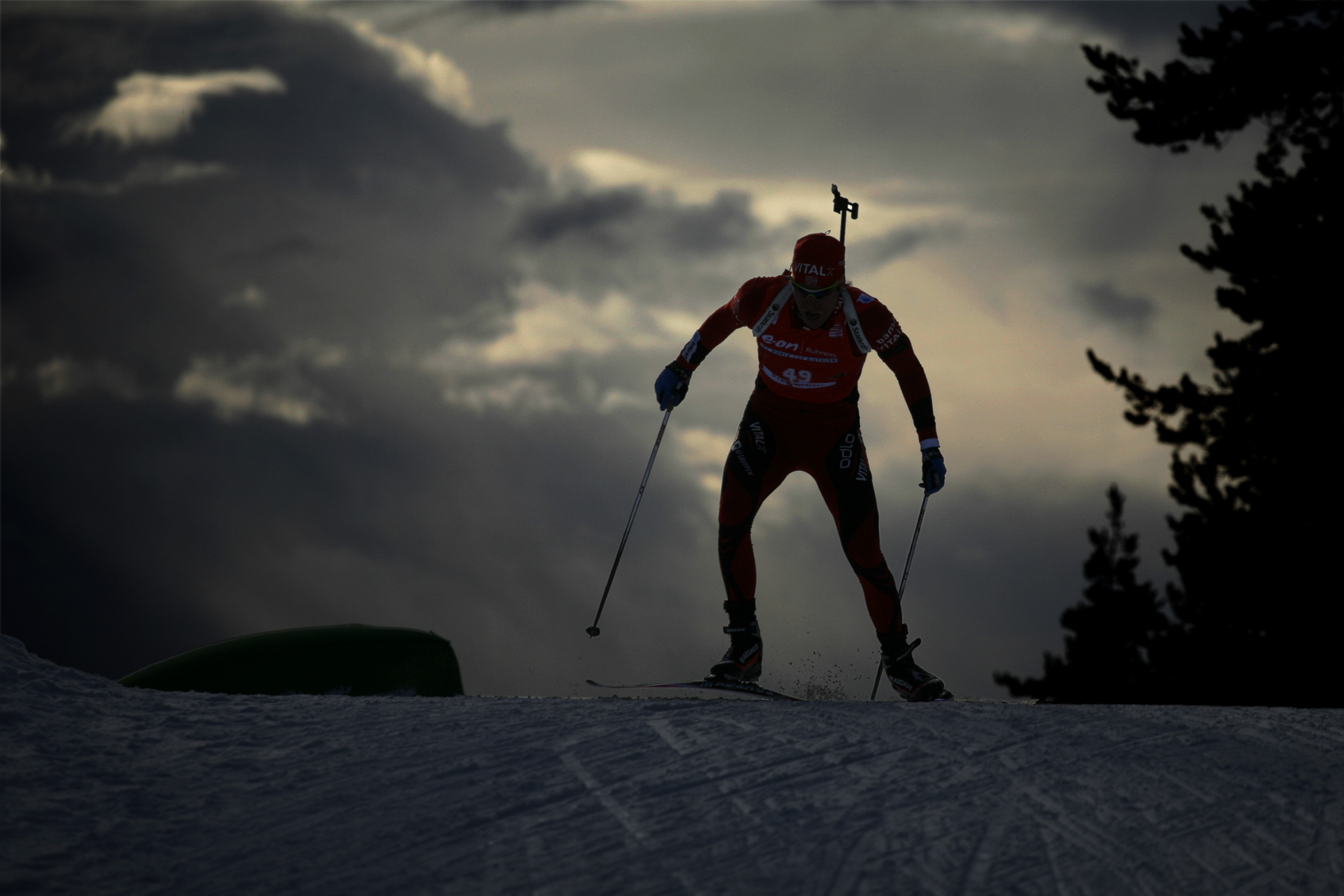
Emil Hegle Svendsen Kontiolahti, 2010

He won a silver medal in the 10 km sprint at the 2010 Winter Olympics in Vancouver on the first day of men's biathlon competition and then followed it up with two gold medals in the 20 km individual and the relay event.

He won 2 gold medals in 2014 Winter Olympics: in mass-start and mixed relay (together with Ole Einar Bjørndalen, Tiril Eckhoff and Tora Berger).

Svendsen is 6 ft 1 in (185 cm) tall, and weighs 170 lb (77 kg, 12 st 2 lb)

On 9 April 2018, he announced his retirement from biathlon following the 2017–2018 season.

== Personal life ==
Svendsen was in a relationship with a fellow biathlete Kaja Eckhoff, sister of the biathletes Stian and Tiril Eckhoff, for several years after meeting her in the early 2000s at the Norges Toppidrettsgymnas in Lillehammer where they both studied as teenagers, before breaking up in the summer of 2011.

He then was in a relationship with Samantha Skogrand from November 2013 to autumn 2022. They got engaged in December 2016, but never married. In January 2019 the couple became parents to a son whom they named Magnus and in July 2021 they welcomed their second child - daughter Elsa. The family resided in Oslo. They announced their separation in a joint statement on Instagram on 28 April 2023.

After retiring from competition in 2018 Svendsen decided to study for a bachelor's degree in business administration. While studying he worked as a biathlon expert for the Norwegian TV channel NRK in 2019-2021 and a coach with the privately funded Norwegian biathlon youth team Meistebakken. As of 2023 he has finished his studies and is working for the Norwegian real estate company Fredensborg Fritid as a real estate developer.

== Biathlon results ==
All results are sourced from the International Biathlon Union.

=== Olympic Games ===
8 medals (4 gold, 3 silver, 1 bronze)

Event	Individual	Sprint	Pursuit	Mass start	Relay	Mixed relay
(Italy) 2006 Turin	—	—	—	6th	—	—N/a
(Canada) 2010 Vancouver	Gold	Silver	8th	13th	Gold	—N/a
(Russia) 2014 Sochi	7th	9th	7th	Gold	Bronze	Gold
(South Korea) 2018 Pyeongchang	10th	18th	20th	Bronze	Silver	Silver

*The mixed relay was added as an event in 2014.

=== World Championships ===
21 medals (12 gold, 6 silver, 3 bronze)

Event	Individual	Sprint	Pursuit	Mass start	Relay	Mixed relay
(Italy) 2007 Antholz-Anterselva	—	7th	5th	—	—	Bronze
(Sweden) 2008 Östersund	Gold	12th	12th	Gold	Silver	—
(South Korea) 2009 Pyeongchang	DNS	—	—	12th	Gold	—
(Russia) 2010 Khanty-Mansiysk	—N/a	—N/a	—N/a	—N/a	—N/a	Silver
(Russia) 2011 Khanty-Mansiysk	4th	5th	Silver	Gold	Gold	—
(Germany) 2012 Ruhpolding	8th	Silver	5th	18th	Gold	Gold
(Czech Republic) 2013 Nové Město	—	Gold	Gold	Bronze	Gold	Gold
(Finland) 2015 Kontiolahti	Silver	36th	19th	15th	Silver	—
(Norway) 2016 Oslo Holmenkollen	32nd	17th	Bronze	28th	Gold	—
(Austria) 2017 Hochfilzen	27th	36th	DNS	28th	8th	8th

*During Olympic seasons competitions are only held for those events not included in the Olympic program.

=== Junior/Youth World Championships ===
Event	Individual	Sprint	Pursuit	Relay
(Italy) 2002 Ridnaun-Val Ridanna	18th	13th	13th	11th
(Poland) 2003 Kościelisko	Bronze	7th	Bronze	4th
(France) 2004 Haute Maurienne	14th	6th	Gold	Gold
(Finland) 2005 Kontiolahti	Gold	Gold	Silver	10th

=== World Cup ===
Season	Overall			Individual			Sprint			Pursuit			Mass start		
Season	Races	Points	Position	Races	Points	Position	Races	Points	Position	Races	Points	Position	Races	Points	Position
2005–06	17/26	289	22nd	0/3	0	—N/a	7/10	120	21st	5/8	52	32nd	5/5	117	7th
2006–07	19/27	381	17th	0/4	0	—N/a	8/10	158	14th	6/8	154	12th	3/5	69	18th
2007–08	20/26	687	3rd	2/3	100	2nd	8/10	253	3rd	6/8	210	6th	4/5	124	5th
2008–09	19/26	844	3rd	2/4	72	14th	7/10	318	3rd	6/7	308	2nd	4/5	146	7th
2009–10	19/25	828	1st	2/4	120	2nd	8/10	354	1st	4/6	173	8th	5/5	163	2nd
2010–11	24/26	1105	2nd	4/4	188	1st	9/10	369	2nd	6/7	304	3rd	5/5	244	1st
2011–12	26/26	1035	2nd	3/3	108	3rd	10/10	378	2nd	8/8	349	2nd	5/5	218	2nd
2012–13	20/26	827	2nd	1/3	43	25th	8/10	315	2nd	7/8	287	2nd	4/5	182	2nd
2013–14	18/22	642	2nd	2/2	84	1st	7/9	240	6th	6/8	217	7th	3/3	101	4th
2014–15	21/25	613	9th	2/3	114	3rd	8/10	191	17th	6/7	199	6th	5/5	109	15th
2015–16	19/25	595	10th	3/3	64	15th	6/9	183	14th	6/8	229	7th	4/5	119	15th
2016–17	19/26	667	7th	1/3	14	49th	8/9	276	3rd	6/9	249	5th	4/5	128	12th
2017–18	10/22	323	24th	2/2	41	15th	3/8	106	24th	3/7	126	20th	2/5	50	29th

=== Individual victories ===
38 victories (8 In, 11 Sp, 12 Pu, 7 MS)

Season	Date	Location	Discipline	Level
2007–08; 6 victories (2 In, 2 Sp, 1 Pu, 1 MS)	13 December 2007	(Slovenia) Pokljuka	20 km individual	Biathlon World Cup
2007–08; 6 victories (2 In, 2 Sp, 1 Pu, 1 MS)	14 February 2008	(Sweden) Östersund	20 km individual	Biathlon World Championships
2007–08; 6 victories (2 In, 2 Sp, 1 Pu, 1 MS)	17 February 2008	(Sweden) Östersund	15 km mass start	Biathlon World Championships
2007–08; 6 victories (2 In, 2 Sp, 1 Pu, 1 MS)	27 February 2008	(South Korea) Pyeongchang	10 km sprint	Biathlon World Cup
2007–08; 6 victories (2 In, 2 Sp, 1 Pu, 1 MS)	8 March 2008	(Russia) Khanty-Mansiysk	12.5 km pursuit	Biathlon World Cup
2007–08; 6 victories (2 In, 2 Sp, 1 Pu, 1 MS)	13 March 2008	(Norway) Oslo Holmenkollen	10 km sprint	Biathlon World Cup
2008–09; 5 victories (3 Sp, 2 Pu)	6 December 2008	(Sweden) Östersund	10 km sprint	Biathlon World Cup
2008–09; 5 victories (3 Sp, 2 Pu)	12 December 2008	(Austria) Hochfilzen	10 km sprint	Biathlon World Cup
2008–09; 5 victories (3 Sp, 2 Pu)	13 December 2008	(Austria) Hochfilzen	12.5 km pursuit	Biathlon World Cup
2008–09; 5 victories (3 Sp, 2 Pu)	23 January 2009	(Italy) Antholz-Anterselva	10 km sprint	Biathlon World Cup
2008–09; 5 victories (3 Sp, 2 Pu)	28 March 2009	(Russia) Khanty-Mansiysk	12.5 km pursuit	Biathlon World Cup
2009–10; 5 victories (2 In, 1 Sp, 1 Pu, 1 MS)	3 December 2009	(Sweden) Östersund	20 km individual	Biathlon World Cup
2009–10; 5 victories (2 In, 1 Sp, 1 Pu, 1 MS)	12 December 2009	(Austria) Hochfilzen	12.5 km pursuit	Biathlon World Cup
2009–10; 5 victories (2 In, 1 Sp, 1 Pu, 1 MS)	14 January 2010	(Germany) Ruhpolding	10 km sprint	Biathlon World Cup
2009–10; 5 victories (2 In, 1 Sp, 1 Pu, 1 MS)	16 January 2010	(Germany) Ruhpolding	15 km mass start	Biathlon World Cup
2009–10; 5 victories (2 In, 1 Sp, 1 Pu, 1 MS)	18 February 2010	(Canada) Vancouver	20 km individual	Winter Olympic Games
2010–11; 8 victories (2 In, 2 Sp, 2 Pu, 2 MS)	2 December 2010	(Sweden) Östersund	20 km individual	Biathlon World Cup
2010–11; 8 victories (2 In, 2 Sp, 2 Pu, 2 MS)	4 December 2010	(Sweden) Östersund	10 km sprint	Biathlon World Cup
2010–11; 8 victories (2 In, 2 Sp, 2 Pu, 2 MS)	12 January 2011	(Germany) Ruhpolding	20 km individual	Biathlon World Cup
2010–11; 8 victories (2 In, 2 Sp, 2 Pu, 2 MS)	10 February 2011	(United States) Fort Kent	10 km sprint	Biathlon World Cup
2010–11; 8 victories (2 In, 2 Sp, 2 Pu, 2 MS)	12 February 2011	(United States) Fort Kent	12.5 km pursuit	Biathlon World Cup
2010–11; 8 victories (2 In, 2 Sp, 2 Pu, 2 MS)	12 March 2011	(Russia) Khanty-Mansiysk	15 km mass start	Biathlon World Championships
2010–11; 8 victories (2 In, 2 Sp, 2 Pu, 2 MS)	19 March 2011	(Norway) Oslo Holmenkollen	12.5 km pursuit	Biathlon World Cup
2010–11; 8 victories (2 In, 2 Sp, 2 Pu, 2 MS)	20 March 2011	(Norway) Oslo Holmenkollen	15 km mass start	Biathlon World Cup
2011–12; 4 victories (1 Sp, 1 Pu, 2 MS)	10 December 2011	(Austria) Hochfilzen	12.5 km pursuit	Biathlon World Cup
2011–12; 4 victories (1 Sp, 1 Pu, 2 MS)	14 January 2012	(Czech Republic) Nové Město	10 km sprint	Biathlon World Cup
2011–12; 4 victories (1 Sp, 1 Pu, 2 MS)	5 February 2012	(Norway) Oslo Holmenkollen	15 km mass start	Biathlon World Cup
2011–12; 4 victories (1 Sp, 1 Pu, 2 MS)	18 March 2012	(Russia) Khanty-Mansiysk	15 km mass start	Biathlon World Cup
2012–13; 3 victories (1 Sp, 2 Pu)	15 December 2012	(Slovenia) Pokljuka	12.5 km pursuit	Biathlon World Cup
2012–13; 3 victories (1 Sp, 2 Pu)	9 February 2013	(Czech Republic) Nové Město	10 km sprint	Biathlon World Championships
2012–13; 3 victories (1 Sp, 2 Pu)	10 February 2013	(Czech Republic) Nové Město	12.5 km pursuit	Biathlon World Championships
2013–14; 5 victories (1 In, 1 Sp, 2 Pu, 1 MS)	3 January 2014	(Germany) Oberhof	10 km sprint	Biathlon World Cup
2013–14; 5 victories (1 In, 1 Sp, 2 Pu, 1 MS)	4 January 2014	(Germany) Oberhof	12.5 km pursuit	Biathlon World Cup
2013–14; 5 victories (1 In, 1 Sp, 2 Pu, 1 MS)	11 January 2014	(Germany) Ruhpolding	20 km individual	Biathlon World Cup
2013–14; 5 victories (1 In, 1 Sp, 2 Pu, 1 MS)	12 January 2014	(Germany) Ruhpolding	12.5 km pursuit	Biathlon World Cup
2013–14; 5 victories (1 In, 1 Sp, 2 Pu, 1 MS)	18 February 2014	(Russia) Sochi	15 km mass start	Winter Olympic Games
2014–15; 2 victories (1 In, 1 Pu)	3 December 2014	(Sweden) Östersund	20 km individual	Biathlon World Cup
2014–15; 2 victories (1 In, 1 Pu)	20 December 2014	(Slovenia) Pokljuka	12.5 km pursuit	Biathlon World Cup

*Results are from UIPMB and IBU races which include the Biathlon World Cup, Biathlon World Championships and the Winter Olympic Games.

== See also ==
- List of multiple Olympic gold medalists

Olympic Games
Preceded by Aksel Lund Svindal	Flagbearer for Norway; 2018 Pyeongchang	Succeeded by Incumbent
