= Alexis Bœuf =

French biathlete (born 1986)

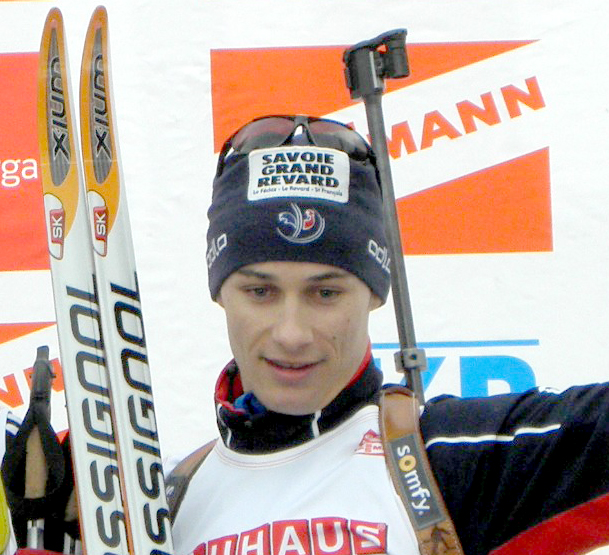

Personal information
- Full name: Alexis Bœuf
- Born: 4 March 1986 (age 40) Chambéry, France
- Height: 1.72 m (5 ft 8 in)

Sport

Olympic Games
- Teams: 1 (2014)
- Medals: 0

World Championships
- Teams: 3 (2011–2013)
- Medals: 4

World Cup
- Seasons: 2008–2014
- Individual victories: 1
- All victories: 5
- Individual podiums: 4
- All podiums: 13
Medal record
Men's biathlon
Representing France
World Championships
Silver medal – second place	2012 Ruhpolding	4 × 7.5 km relay
Silver medal – second place	2013 Nové Město	4 × 7.5 km relay
Silver medal – second place	2013 Nové Město	Mixed relay
Bronze medal – third place	2011 Khanty-Mansiysk	Mixed relay
Junior World Championships
Gold medal – first place	2006 Presque Isle	4 × 7.5 km relay
- Updated on 11 December 2010

Alexis Bœuf (born 4 March 1986 in Chambéry) is a retired French biathlete. First World Cup podium was in Antholz-Anterselva Individual 21 January 2010. He won Presque Isle pursuit in February 2011, his only World Cup victory. He announced his retirement during the 2014–15 season after the sprint in Hochfilzen.

He is a color analyst during biathlon World Cup broadcast on French L'Équipe (TV channel).

== Biathlon results ==
All results are sourced from the International Biathlon Union.

=== Olympic Games ===
Event	Individual	Sprint	Pursuit	Mass start	Relay	Mixed relay
(Russia) 2014 Sochi	81st	—	—	—	8th	—

=== World Championships ===
4 medals (3 silver, 1 bronze)

Event	Individual	Sprint	Pursuit	Mass start	Relay	Mixed relay
(Russia) 2011 Khanty-Mansiysk	DNF	70th	—	—	12th	Bronze
(Germany) 2012 Ruhpolding	52nd	9th	18th	15th	Silver	—
(Czech Republic) 2013 Nové Město	27th	6th	8th	28th	Silver	Silver

=== World Cup ===
World Cup rankings

Season	Overall		Individual		Sprint		Pursuit		Mass start	
Season	Points	Position	Points	Position	Points	Position	Points	Position	Points	Position
2007–08	-	76th	-	—	-	—	-	50th	-	—
2008–09	-	82nd	-	—	-	72nd	-	77th	-	—
2009–10	-	53rd	-	28th	-	61st	-	60th	-	—
2010–11	-	18th	-	32nd	-	22nd	-	11th	-	24th
2011–12	-	23rd	-	40th	-	19th	-	31st	-	15th
2012–13	-	17th	-	37th	-	13th	-	18th	-	21st
2013–14	-	39th	-	17th	-	45th	-	34th	-	—
2014–15	-	not ranked	-	not ranked	-	not ranked	-	—	-	—

Individual victories

1 victory

No.	Season	Date	Location	Discipline	Level
1	2010–11	6 February 2011	(United States) Presque Isle	12.5 km Pursuit	Biathlon World Cup

Relay victories

4 victories

No.	Season	Date	Location	Discipline	Level	Team
1	2011–12	22 January 2012	(Italy) Antholz-Anterselva	Relay	Biathlon World Cup	Béatrix / S.Fourcade / Boeuf / Fourcade
2	2012–13	10 January 2013	(Germany) Ruhpolding	Relay	Biathlon World Cup	S.Fourcade / Béatrix / Boeuf / Fourcade
3	2012–13	20 January 2013	(Italy) Antholz-Anterselva	Relay	Biathlon World Cup	S.Fourcade / Béatrix / Boeuf / Fourcade
4	2013–14	19 January 2014	(Italy) Antholz-Anterselva	Relay	Biathlon World Cup	S.Fourcade / Boeuf / Béatrix / Fourcade
