= Lowell Bailey =

American biathlete (born 1981)

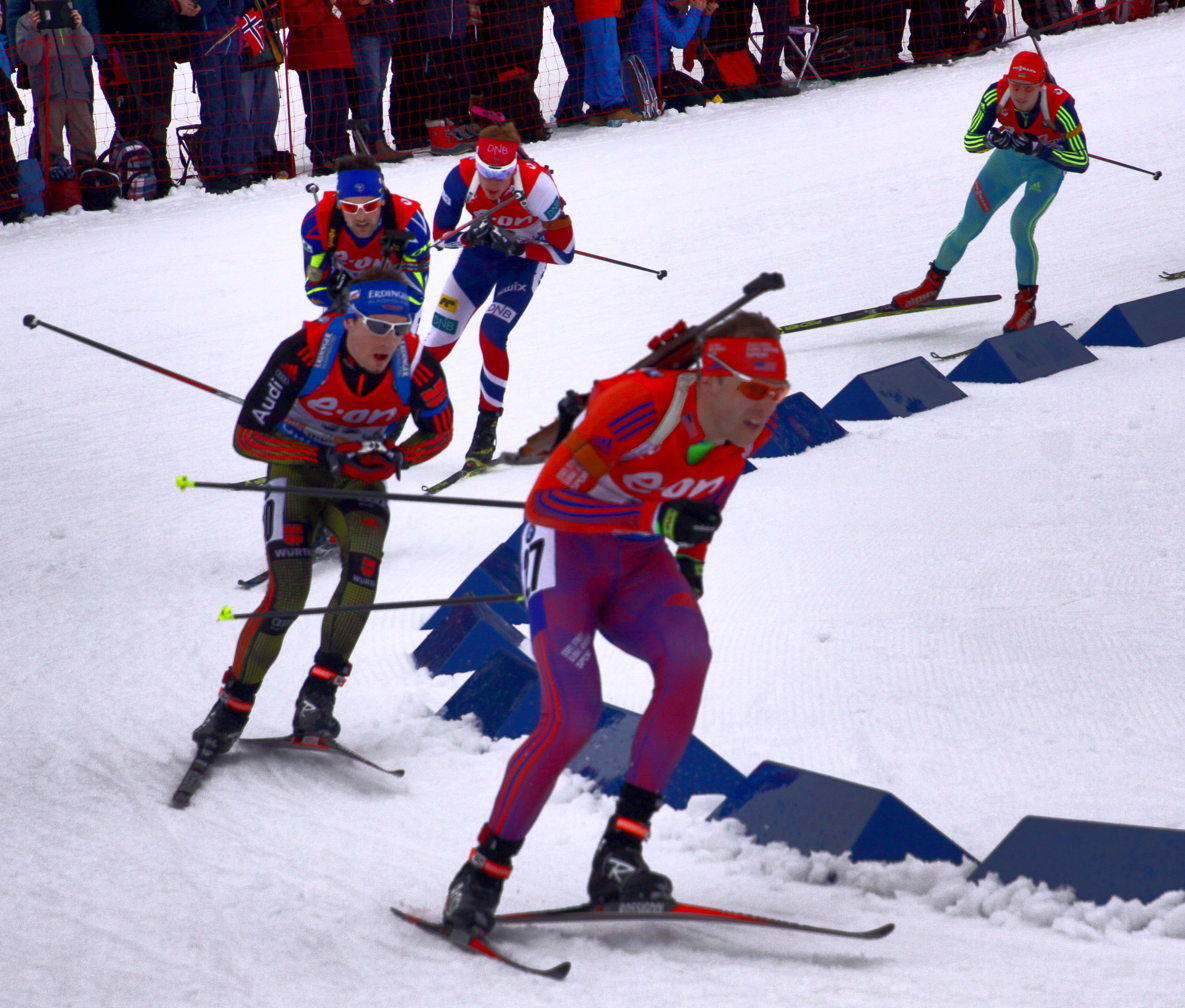
- Bailey (front leader) in 2016.

Personal information
- Full name: Lowell Conrad Bailey
- Born: July 15, 1981 (age 45) Siler City, North Carolina, U.S.
- Height: 6 ft 1 in (185 cm)
- Weight: 170 lb (77 kg)

Sport

Professional information
- Sport: Biathlon
- Club: NYSEF
- Skis: Rossignol
- Rifle: Anschütz
- World Cup debut: January 24, 2002
- Retired: March 18, 2018

Olympic Games
- Teams: 4 (2006, 2010, 2014, 2018)
- Medals: 0

World Championships
- Teams: 11 (2003, 2006, 2007, 2008, 2009, 2011, 2012, 2013, 2015, 2016, 2017)
- Medals: 1 (1 gold)

World Cup
- Seasons: 15 (2001/02–2002/03, 2005/06–2017/18)
- Individual victories: 1
- All victories: 1
- Individual podiums: 3
- All podiums: 4
Medal record
Men's biathlon
Representing United States
World Championships
Gold medal – first place	2017 Hochfilzen	20 km individual
- Updated on March 18, 2018

Lowell Bailey (born July 15, 1981 in Siler City, North Carolina) is an American biathlon coach and retired biathlete who competed from 2001 until 2018.

== Career ==
His first World Cup podium was a 2nd place (following a disqualification) in the second sprint event at Kontiolahti (FIN) in 2014., and his first World Cup victory came in the 20 km event at the 2017 Biathlon World Championships in Hochfilzen, Austria. He thus became the first biathlon world champion from the United States, as well as the oldest individual gold medalist at the World Championships in biathlon history, at 35 years and 216 days.

At the 2006 Winter Olympics, he finished 27th in the individual, 46th in the sprint, and 48th in the pursuit events.

At the 2010 Winter Olympics, he finished 36th in the 10 km sprint event and he also finished 36th in the 12.5 km pursuit.

He decided to retire at the end of 8th leg of 2017–18 Biathlon World Cup. In 2019 Bailey was appointed as the U.S. Biathlon Association's High Performance Director, working alongside former team-mate and Director of Athlete Development Tim Burke.

== Results ==
All results are sourced from the International Biathlon Union.

=== Olympic Games ===
Event	Individual	Sprint	Pursuit	Mass start	Relay	Mixed relay
(Italy) 2006 Turin	27th	46th	48th	—	9th	—N/a
(Canada) 2010 Vancouver	57th	36th	36th	—	13th	—N/a
(Russia) 2014 Sochi	8th	35th	38th	23rd	16th	8th
(South Korea) 2018 Pyeongchang	51st	33rd	32nd	—	6th	15th

*The mixed relay was added as an event in 2014.

=== World Championships ===
1 medal (1 gold)

Event	Individual	Sprint	Pursuit	Mass start	Relay	Mixed relay
(Russia) 2003 Khanty-Mansiysk	45th	59th	50th	—	17th	—N/a
(Slovenia) 2006 Pokljuka	—N/a	—N/a	—N/a	—N/a	—N/a	18th
(Italy) 2007 Antholz-Anterselva	41st	48th	50th	—	9th	DNS
(Sweden) 2008 Östersund	56th	61st	—	—	15th	—
(South Korea) 2009 Pyeongchang	22nd	55th	22nd	18th	21st	—
(Russia) 2011 Khanty-Mansiysk	78th	32nd	45th	—	6th	—
(Germany) 2012 Ruhpolding	38th	20th	20th	25th	10th	12th
(Czech Republic) 2013 Nové Město	29th	32nd	13th	13th	12th	8th
(Finland) 2015 Kontiolahti	24th	17th	36th	13th	14th	8th
(Norway) 2016 Oslo	15th	29th	36th	10th	8th	10th
(Austria) 2017 Hochfilzen	Gold	4th	6th	6th	7th	16th

*During Olympic seasons competitions are only held for those events not included in the Olympic program.
**The mixed relay was added as an event in 2005.

=== Individual victories ===
1 victory (1 In)

Season	Date	Location	Discipline	Level
2016–17; 1 victory (1 In)	February 16, 2017	(Austria) Hochfilzen	20 km individual	Biathlon World Championships

*Results are from UIPMB and IBU races which include the Biathlon World Cup, Biathlon World Championships and the Winter Olympic Games.
