= Scott Perras =

Canadian biathlete

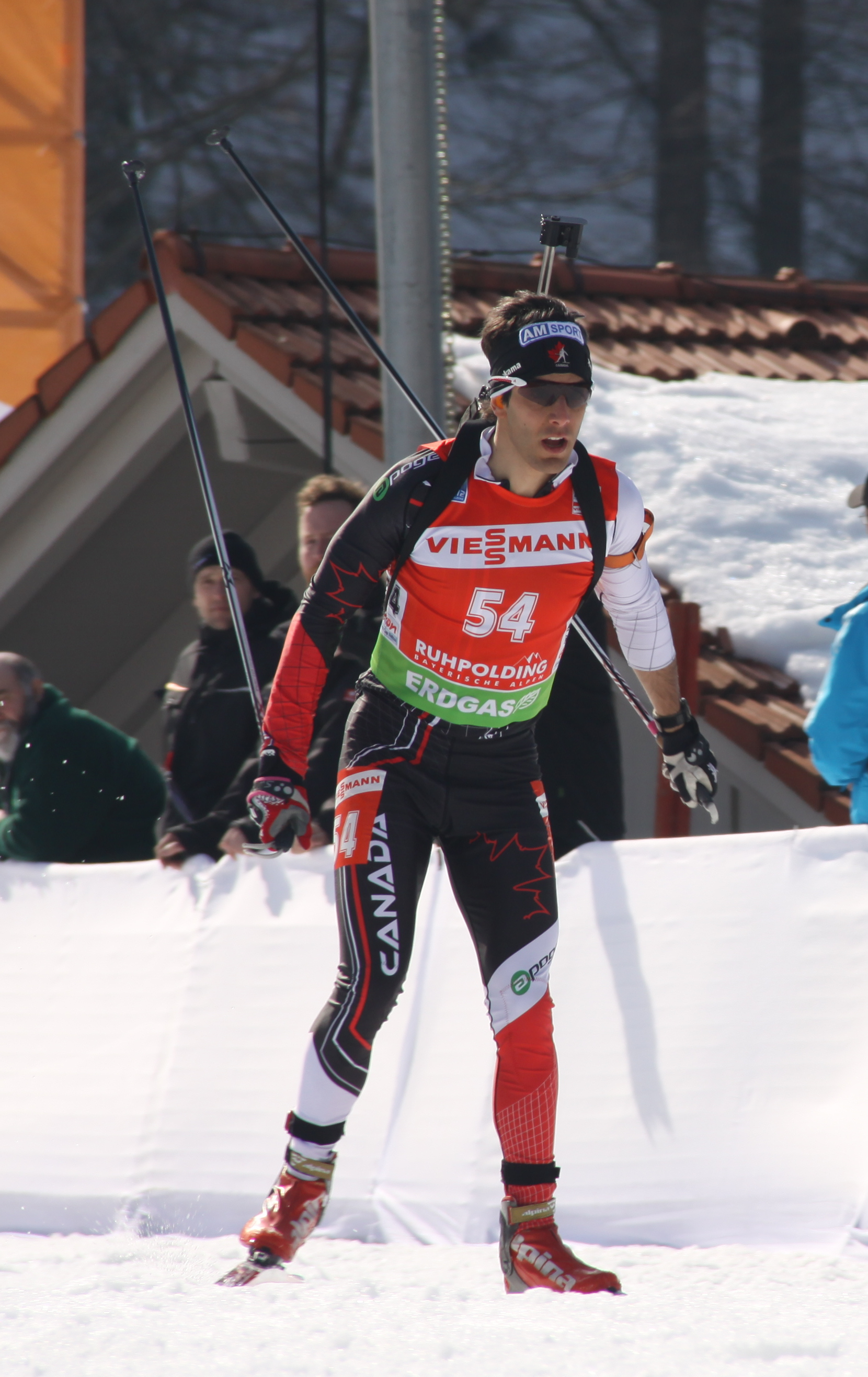
- Scott Perras

Personal information
- Born: 25 October 1983 (age 42) Regina, Saskatchewan
- Height: 1.79 m (5 ft 10 in)

Sport
- Sport: Skiing
- Club: Regina Ski Club

Achievements and titles
- Personal bests: 10th World Cup #5 Ruhpolding, Germany.
Medal record
Men's biathlon
Representing Canada

Scott Perras (born October 25, 1983, in Regina, Saskatchewan) is a former Canadian biathlete. He competed for Canada at the 2014 Winter Olympics.
