= Biathlon World Championships 2013 =

46th edition of the Biathlon World Championships

- Host city: Nové Město na Moravě
- Country: Czech Republic
- Events: 11
- Opening: 7 February
- Closing: 17 February

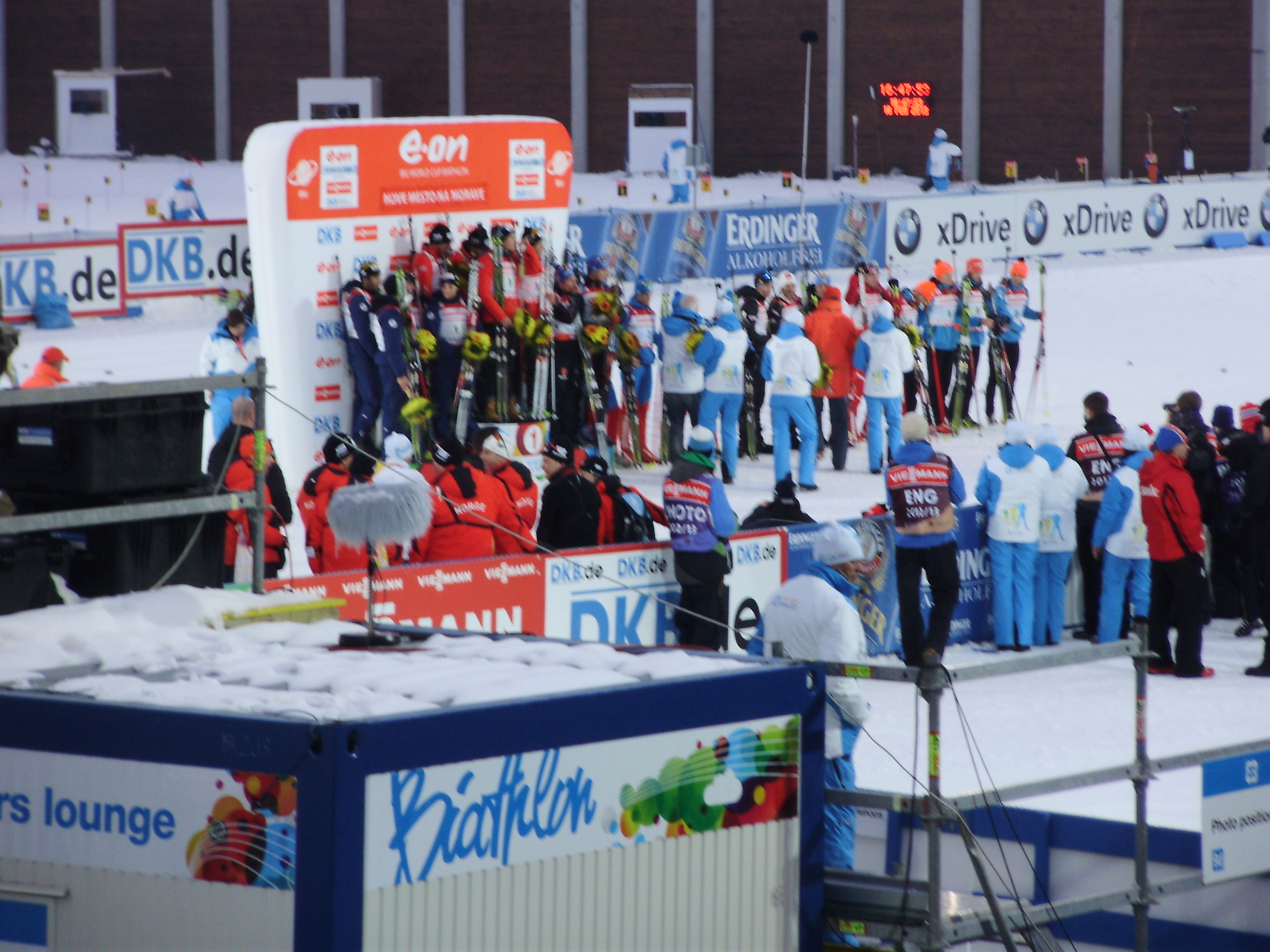
The 46th Biathlon World Championships

The 46th Biathlon World Championships was held in Nové Město na Moravě, Czech Republic, from 7 to 17 February 2013.

There were a total of 11 competitions: sprint, pursuit, individual, mass start and relay races for both men, women and a mixed relay. All events during the championships also counted for the Biathlon World Cup season.

Norway took a record 8 out of 11 gold medals.

== Schedule ==
All times are local.

Date	Time	Event
7 February	17:30	2 × 6 km + 2 × 7.5 km mixed relay
9 February	13:00	Men's 10 km sprint
9 February	16:15	Women's 7.5 km sprint
10 February	13:00	Men's 12.5 km pursuit
10 February	16:15	Women's 10 km pursuit
13 February	17:15	Women's 15 km individual
14 February	17:15	Men's 20 km individual
15 February	17:15	Women's 4 × 6 km relay
16 February	15:15	Men's 4 × 7.5 km relay
17 February	12:00	Women's 12.5 km mass start
17 February	15:00	Men's 15 km mass start

== Medal winners ==
=== Men ===
Event	Gold		Silver		Bronze	
10 km sprint	Emil Hegle Svendsen; Norway	23:25.1 (0+1)	Martin Fourcade; France	23:33.2 (0+1)	Jakov Fak; Slovenia	23:36.3 (0+0)
12.5 km pursuit	Emil Hegle Svendsen; Norway	32:35.5 (0+0+0+1)	Martin Fourcade; France	32:35.6 (0+1+1+0)	Anton Shipulin; Russia	32:39.1 (0+0+1+0)
20 km individual	Martin Fourcade; France	49:43.0 (0+0+0+1)	Tim Burke; United States	50:06.5 (0+0+0+1)	Fredrik Lindström; Sweden	50:16.7 (0+0+0+1)
4 × 7.5 km relay	Norway Ole Einar Bjørndalen; Henrik L'Abée-Lund; Tarjei Bø; Emil Hegle Svendsen	1:15:39.0 (0+1) (0+2) (0+0) (0+0) (0+1) (0+0) (0+0) (0+1)	France Simon Fourcade; Jean-Guillaume Béatrix; Alexis Bœuf; Martin Fourcade	1:16:51.8 (0+0) (0+3) (0+0) (0+1) (0+0) (0+1) (0+0) (0+2)	Germany Simon Schempp; Andreas Birnbacher; Arnd Peiffer; Erik Lesser	1:16:57.5 (0+0) (0+0) (0+0) (0+0) (0+0) (0+0) (0+0) (2+3)
15 km mass start	Tarjei Bø; Norway	36:15.8 (0+0+0+0)	Anton Shipulin; Russia	36:19.5 (0+0+1+0)	Emil Hegle Svendsen; Norway	36:23.2 (0+1+0+0)

=== Women ===
Event	Gold		Silver		Bronze	
7.5 km sprint	Olena Pidhrushna; Ukraine	21:02.1 (0+0)	Tora Berger; Norway	21:08.5 (0+1)	Vita Semerenko; Ukraine	21:24.9 (0+0)
10 km pursuit	Tora Berger; Norway	28:48.4 (0+1+2+0)	Krystyna Pałka; Poland	29:06.9 (0+0+1+1)	Olena Pidhrushna; Ukraine	29:09.9 (0+0+2+0)
15 km individual	Tora Berger; Norway	44:52.5 (0+0+0+0)	Andrea Henkel; Germany	45:45.2 (0+0+0+0)	Valentyna Semerenko; Ukraine	46:35.0 (1+0+0+0)
4 × 6 km relay	Norway Hilde Fenne; Ann Kristin Flatland; Synnøve Solemdal; Tora Berger	1:08:11.0 (0+2) (1+3) (0+0) (0+2) (0+0) (0+1) (0+0) (0+1)	Ukraine Yuliia Dzhima; Vita Semerenko; Valentyna Semerenko; Olena Pidhrushna	1:08:18.0 (0+0) (0+1) (0+2) (0+0) (0+1) (0+0) (0+0) (0+1)	Italy Dorothea Wierer; Nicole Gontier; Michela Ponza; Karin Oberhofer	1:08:22.6 (0+0) (0+0) (0+2) (0+0) (0+0) (0+2) (0+0) (0+0)
12.5 km mass start	Darya Domracheva; Belarus	35:54.5 (1+0+0+1)	Tora Berger; Norway	36:03.2 (1+0+1+0)	Monika Hojnisz; Poland	36:22.1 (0+0+1+0)

=== Mixed ===
Event	Gold		Silver		Bronze	
2 × 6 + 2 × 7.5 km W+M relay	Norway Tora Berger; Synnøve Solemdal; Tarjei Bø; Emil Hegle Svendsen	1:12:04.9 (0+0) (0+0) (0+0) (0+2) (0+1) (0+0) (0+0) (0+1)	France Marie-Laure Brunet; Marie Dorin Habert; Alexis Bœuf; Martin Fourcade	1:12:24.9 (0+0) (0+2) (0+1) (0+2) (0+0) (0+2) (0+0) (0+1)	Czech Republic Veronika Vítková; Gabriela Soukalová; Jaroslav Soukup; Ondřej Moravec	1:12:37.2 (0+2) (0+1) (0+1) (0+0) (0+0) (0+1) (0+0) (0+0)

== Medal table ==
=== Top nations ===
Rank	Nation	Gold	Silver	Bronze	Total
1	Norway	8	2	1	11
2	France	1	4	0	5
3	Ukraine	1	1	3	5
4	Belarus	1	0	0	1
5	Germany	0	1	1	2
5	Poland	0	1	1	2
5	Russia	0	1	1	2
8	United States	0	1	0	1
9	Czech Republic	0	0	1	1
9	Italy	0	0	1	1
9	Slovenia	0	0	1	1
9	Sweden	0	0	1	1
Totals (12 entries)		11	11	11	33

=== Top athletes ===
All athletes with one gold or two or more medals.

Rank	Biathlete	Gold	Silver	Bronze	Total
1	Tora Berger (NOR)	4	2	0	6
2	Emil Hegle Svendsen (NOR)	4	0	1	5
3	Tarjei Bø (NOR)	3	0	0	3
4	Synnøve Solemdal (NOR)	2	0	0	2
5	Martin Fourcade (FRA)	1	4	0	5
6	Olena Pidhrushna (UKR)	1	1	1	3
7	Ann Kristin Flatland (NOR)	1	0	0	1
7	Darya Domracheva (BLR)	1	0	0	1
7	Henrik L'Abée-Lund (NOR)	1	0	0	1
7	Hilde Fenne (NOR)	1	0	0	1
7	Ole Einar Bjørndalen (NOR)	1	0	0	1
12	Alexis Bœuf (FRA)	0	2	0	2
13	Anton Shipulin (RUS)	0	1	1	2
13	Valj Semerenko (UKR)	0	1	1	2
13	Vita Semerenko (UKR)	0	1	1	2
