= 2010–11 Biathlon World Cup – Overall Men =

== 2009–10 Top 3 Standings ==
Medal	Athlete	Points
Gold:	(Norway) Emil Hegle Svendsen	828
Silver:	(Austria) Christoph Sumann	813
Bronze:	(Russia) Ivan Tcherezov	782

== Events summary ==
Event:	Winner:	Second:	Third:
Östersund 20 km Individual details	Emil Hegle Svendsen; Norway	Ole Einar Bjørndalen; Norway	Martin Fourcade; France
Östersund 10 km Sprint details	Emil Hegle Svendsen; Norway	Ole Einar Bjørndalen; Norway	Martin Fourcade; France
Östersund 12.5 km Pursuit details	Ole Einar Bjørndalen; Norway	Emil Hegle Svendsen; Norway	Jakov Fak; Slovenia
Hochfilzen 10 km Sprint details	Tarjei Bø; Norway	Serguei Sednev; Ukraine	Alexis Bœuf; France
Hochfilzen 12.5 km Pursuit details	Tarjei Bø; Norway	Simon Eder; Austria	Ivan Tcherezov; Russia
Pokljuka 20 km Individual details	Daniel Mesotitsch; Austria	Benjamin Weger; Switzerland	Serguei Sednev; Ukraine
Pokljuka 10 km Sprint details'	Björn Ferry; Sweden	Tarjei Bø; Norway	Michael Greis; Germany
Oberhof 10 km Sprint details	Tarjei Bø; Norway	Arnd Peiffer; Germany	Michal Šlesingr; Czech Republic
Oberhof 15 km Mass start details	Tarjei Bø; Norway	Emil Hegle Svendsen; Norway	Ivan Tcherezov; Russia
Ruhpolding 20 km Individual details	Emil Hegle Svendsen; Norway	Martin Fourcade; France	Dominik Landertinger; Austria
Ruhpolding 10 km Sprint details	Lars Berger; Norway	Martin Fourcade; France	Ivan Tcherezov; Russia
Ruhpolding 12.5 km Pursuit details	Björn Ferry; Sweden	Martin Fourcade; France	Michael Greis; Germany
Antholz-Anterselva 10 km Sprint details	Anton Shipulin; Russia	Michael Greis; Germany	Lars Berger; Norway
Antholz-Anterselva 15 km Mass start details	Martin Fourcade; France	Björn Ferry; Sweden	Anton Shipulin; Russia
Presque Isle 10 km Sprint details	Arnd Peiffer; Germany	Martin Fourcade; France	Ivan Tcherezov; Russia
Presque Isle 12.5 km Pursuit details	Alexis Bœuf; France	Ivan Tcherezov; Russia	Carl Johan Bergman; Sweden
Fort Kent 10 km Sprint details	Emil Hegle Svendsen; Norway	Michal Šlesingr; Czech Republic	Tarjei Bø; Norway
Fort Kent 12.5 km Pursuit details	Emil Hegle Svendsen; Norway	Martin Fourcade; France	Tarjei Bø; Norway
Fort Kent 15 km Mass start details	Martin Fourcade; France	Tomasz Sikora; Poland	Tarjei Bø; Norway
World Championships 10 km Sprint details	Arnd Peiffer; Germany	Martin Fourcade; France	Tarjei Bø; Norway
World Championships 12.5 km Pursuit details	Martin Fourcade; France	Emil Hegle Svendsen; Norway	Tarjei Bø; Norway
World Championships 20 km Individual details	Tarjei Bø; Norway	Maxim Maksimov; Russia	Christoph Sumann; Austria
World Championships 15 km Mass start details	Emil Hegle Svendsen; Norway	Evgeny Ustyugov; Russia	Lukas Hofer; Italy
Oslo 10 km Sprint details	Andreas Birnbacher; Germany	Björn Ferry; Sweden	Alexander Wolf; Germany
Oslo 12.5 km Pursuit details	Emil Hegle Svendsen; Norway	Tarjei Bø; Norway	Martin Fourcade; France
Oslo 15 km Mass start details	Emil Hegle Svendsen; Norway	Evgeny Ustyugov; Russia	Ole Einar Bjørndalen; Norway

== Standings ==
#	Name	ÖST IN	ÖST SP	ÖST PU	HOC SP	HOC PU	POK IN	POK SP	OBE SP	OBE MS	RUH IN	RUH SP	RUH PU	ANT SP	ANT MS	PRI SP	PRI PU	FRK SP	FRK PU	FRK MS	WCH SP	WCH PU	WCH IN	WCH MS	OSL SP	OSL PU	OSL MS	Total
1.	Tarjei Bø (NOR)	43	40	43	60	60	29	54	60	60	40	40	43	0	26	43	38	48	48	48	48	48	60	43	0	54	34	1110
2	Emil Hegle Svendsen (NOR)	60	60	54	43	40	25	24	34	54	60	43	36	27	32	—	—	60	60	38	40	54	43	60	38	60	60	1105
3	Martin Fourcade (FRA)	48	48	40	3	28	0	25	0	43	54	54	54	20	60	54	36	43	54	60	54	60	31	31	6	48	36	990
4	Arnd Peiffer (GER)	19	28	23	10	19	18	23	54	29	21	28	24	36	40	60	43	—	—	—	60	43	26	34	34	23	40	735
5	Ivan Tcherezov (RUS)	—	0	—	34	48	4	3	43	48	31	48	40	32	29	48	54	36	34	—	22	23	19	40	22	30	23	711
6	Michael Greis (GER)	30	32	26	22	34	9	48	30	40	38	36	48	54	38	—	—	32	—	—	32	30	36	21	7	34	30	707
7	Björn Ferry (SWE)	16	0	12	30	31	0	60	11	31	30	34	60	0	54	0	—	—	—	—	18	31	40	14	54	43	38	607
8	Christoph Sumann (AUT)	20	0	—	26	38	32	22	26	17	—	38	18	31	25	—	—	22	38	24	14	19	48	29	36	28	43	594
9	Michal Šlesingr (CZE)	36	12	27	0	9	0	5	48	34	23	2	15	0	30	30	21	54	43	28	29	34	29	15	29	26	13	592
10	Ole Einar Bjørndalen (NOR)	54	54	60	31	36	0	30	19	20	34	24	—	—	36	—	—	—	—	—	19	17	38	38	28	—	48	586
11	Simon Eder (AUT)	8	5	24	38	54	13	27	0	32	28	21	29	43	34	—	—	21	13	—	24	27	24	32	30	36	19	582
12	Lukas Hofer (ITA)	0	31	36	36	30	0	38	29	22	0	23	14	23	22	34	34	18	5	34	25	32	14	48	0	0	22	570
13	Carl Johan Bergman (SWE)	28	—	—	24	25	12	15	32	25	0	16	28	38	23	40	48	15	40	29	0	13	30	12	23	24	12	552
14	Andreas Birnbacher (GER)	29	36	34	0	0	30	29	0	27	—	—	—	—	—	28	32	28	36	43	38	40	34	25	60	—	—	549
15	Evgeny Ustyugov (RUS)	—	25	19	32	43	19	40	28	28	36	25	10	—	13	—	—	—	—	—	12	29	28	54	15	32	54	542
16	Serguei Sednev (UKR)	27	13	32	54	12	48	34	0	15	0	0	—	19	28	31	17	34	24	31	8	14	—	16	0	—	15	472
17	Lars Berger (NOR)	7	19	14	0	6	0	36	17	—	13	60	38	48	12	—	—	—	—	—	27	22	0	27	31	38	25	440
18	Alexis Bœuf (FRA)	0	26	21	48	32	31	0	0	23	14	13	2	0	21	32	60	29	19	18	0	—	0	—	0	18	16	433
19	Anton Shipulin (RUS)	22	34	38	28	21	22	0	20	14	27	0	—	60	48	—	—	—	—	—	4	20	—	—	11	31	17	417
20	Vincent Jay (FRA)	11	0	7	19	14	40	21	0	26	32	30	25	17	31	27	30	0	—	17	0	0	22	—	0	—	28	397
21	Andrei Makoveev (RUS)	—	—	—	—	—	0	32	40	38	0	19	31	0	—	22	8	24	27	22	43	24	—	36	0	—	20	386
22	Christian De Lorenzi (ITA)	26	20	25	0	0	26	2	0	—	0	20	20	40	20	19	28	26	15	19	20	18	8	18	0	—	14	384
23	Fredrik Lindström (SWE)	0	—	—	0	0	0	26	—	—	6	0	23	34	18	14	20	3	20	36	30	16	0	30	40	40	26	382
24	Jakov Fak (SLO)	34	43	48	0	—	3	43	22	19	—	—	—	12	17	20	26	38	25	25	—	—	—	—	—	—	—	375
25	Maxim Tchoudov (RUS)	24	15	0	23	27	6	0	15	36	26	4	30	30	11	29	40	0	—	11	—	—	32	11	—	—	—	370
26	Christoph Stephan (GER)	0	2	4	13	18	0	16	6	—	20	17	32	26	14	36	0	14	dsq	27	36	25	—	17	0	5	32	360
27	Daniel Mesotitsch (AUT)	31	9	3	27	29	60	0	0	24	18	—	—	0	43	—	—	—	—	—	3	15	0	—	32	15	27	336
28	Alexander Os (NOR)	15	38	30	0	5	21	0	24	13	0	8	7	0	—	4	18	27	32	40	—	—	0	—	9	22	21	334
29	Tomasz Sikora (POL)	40	11	—	9	24	34	20	—	—	24	—	—	0	24	23	24	0	28	54	—	—	—	—	—	—	—	315
30	Simon Fourcade (FRA)	21	0	—	0	—	—	—	0	—	43	26	34	8	—	12	29	4	—	—	28	38	2	26	0	21	—	292
#	Name	ÖST IN	ÖST SP	ÖST PU	HOC SP	HOC PU	POK IN	POK SP	OBE SP	OBE MS	RUH IN	RUH SP	RUH PU	ANT SP	ANT MS	LKP SP	LKP PU	FRK SP	FRK PU	FRK MS	WCH SP	WCH PU	WCH IN	WCH MS	OSL SP	OSL PU	OSL MS	Total
31	Markus Windisch (ITA)	0	6	10	0	—	—	—	23	—	0	0	8	25	27	38	22	25	18	15	23	28	0	13	3	6	—	290
32	Klemen Bauer (SLO)	38	27	1	15	20	0	0	4	—	11	0	11	3	—	18	7	30	31	16	26	7	1	22	0	—	—	288
33	Maxim Maksimov (RUS)	25	7	31	0	—	—	0	—	—	—	—	—	—	—	25	12	19	21	23	—	—	54	23	0	—	—	240
34	Dominik Landertinger (AUT)	0	—	—	40	26	0	31	38	30	48	—	—	—	—	—	—	—	—	—	0	0	25	—	—	—	—	238
35	Serhiy Semenov (UKR)	12	21	6	17	1	0	28	5	—	—	—	—	0	—	—	—	—	—	—	13	26	21	19	43	13	11	237
36	Tobias Eberhard (AUT)	0	0	0	7	16	27	17	8	—	0	27	17	22	—	0	1	0	—	—	—	—	—	—	24	25	24	215
37	Andriy Deryzemlya (UKR)	3	31	11	0	—	16	0	0	—	—	9	21	0	—	—	—	—	—	—	31	36	27	28	0	0	—	213
38	Krasimir Anev (BUL)	23	17	—	29	23	17	14	—	12	19	0	4	16	15	—	—	—	—	—	—	—	0	—	18	0	—	207
39	Benjamin Weger (SUI)	0	1	0	0	0	54	0	36	11	5	0	0	0	—	17	0	20	29	13	0	8	7	—	0	—	—	201
40	Daniel Böhm (GER)	—	—	—	—	—	2	—	—	—	0	29	26	14	—	0	9	40	30	30	—	—	12	—	0	8	—	200
41	Lowell Bailey (USA)	0	3	0	0	2	0	0	0	—	25	0	12	29	19	16	25	10	18	32	9	0	0	—	0	—	—	200
42	Lois Habert (FRA)	0	24	0	0	0	15	0	31	18	16	14	9	5	—	0	13	17	17	14	0	—	—	—	0	4	—	197
43	Alexander Wolf (GER)	18	16	29	8	15	1	4	0	—	1	0	0	0	—	0	—	9	14	—	—	—	—	—	48	2	29	194
44	Jaroslav Soukup (CZE)	0	0	0	2	11	36	0	3	—	29	15	13	11	—	9	11	13	13	26	0	—	0	—	0	—	—	192
45	Tim Burke (USA)	10	23	9	18	22	0	6	10	—	0	0	5	7	—	—	—	0	0	—	10	11	11	—	20	19	—	181
46	Simon Hallenbarter (SUI)	0	0	2	0	—	0	0	0	—	0	32	19	24	—	26	27	9	4	—	17	12	0	—	0	0	—	172
47	Julian Eberhard (AUT)	—	—	—	—	—	—	—	—	—	—	—	—	—	—	21	23	31	26	12	—	—	—	—	19	10	—	142
48	Pavol Hurajt (SVK)	0	0	0	12	17	14	0	0	—	0	0	0	0	—	—	—	—	—	—	0	—	18	—	26	27	18	132
49	Rune Brattsveen (NOR)	—	—	—	—	—	28	0	0	—	—	—	—	—	—	0	10	16	22	21	—	—	—	—	21	9	—	127
50	Jean-Philippe Leguellec (CAN)	0	22	28	14	0	0	0	25	21	0	0	—	—	—	1	6	5	0	—	0	0	—	—	—	—	—	122
51	Ondřej Moravec (CZE)	0	0	—	0	—	0	8	0	—	17	22	27	15	—	—	—	—	—	—	0	—	—	—	12	16	—	117
52	Evgeny Abramenko (BLR)	9	14	22	0	—	0	13	0	—	22	0	—	1	—	—	—	—	—	—	0	—	15	—	10	7	—	113
53	Brendan Green (CAN)	0	0	—	6	0	20	12	27	16	16	0	1	—	—	7	5	0	2	—	0	—	0	—	0	—	—	112
54	Jean-Guillaume Béatrix (FRA)	—	—	—	11	0	0	0	—	—	—	—	—	4	—	11	15	23	23	20	—	—	—	—	0	—	—	107
55	Ilmārs Bricis (LAT)	14	18	17	—	—	0	0	—	—	12	0	0	0	—	—	—	—	—	—	21	5	0	—	13	0	—	100
56	Alexey Volkov (RUS)	17	10	18	0	4	23	—	—	—	—	—	—	—	—	—	—	—	—	—	—	—	—	—	4	20	—	96
57	Matthias Simmen (SUI)	0	0	15	25	13	0	0	16	—	0	2	0	9	—	2	3	0	0	—	6	0	0	—	0	—	—	91
58	Janez Marič (SLO)	32	0	0	0	3	0	0	14	—	—	—	—	0	—	0	—	7	6	—	0	0	10	—	14	0	—	86
59	Edgars Piksons (LAT)	0	0	—	0	0	—	—	0	—	0	7	0	—	—	—	—	—	—	—	34	21	3	20	0	—	—	85
60	Florian Graf (GER)	—	—	—	—	—	—	0	—	—	—	—	—	—	—	—	—	—	—	—	—	—	—	—	27	29	31	85
#	Name	ÖST IN	ÖST SP	ÖST PU	HOC SP	HOC PU	POK IN	POK SP	OBE SP	OBE MS	RUH IN	RUH SP	RUH PU	ANT SP	ANT MS	LKP SP	LKP PU	FRK SP	FRK PU	FRK MS	WCH SP	WCH PU	WCH IN	WCH MS	OSL SP	OSL PU	OSL MS	Total
61	Olexander Bilanenko (UKR)	5	0	20	—	—	11	0	2	—	—	—	—	0	—	—	—	—	—	—	16	0	—	—	17	12	—	83
62	Michail Kletcherov (BUL)	0	—	—	0	0	24	7	0	—	0	3	0	18	—	0	16	6	0	—	0	1	5	—	0	—	—	80
63	Leif Nordgren (USA)	6	0	—	0	—	0	0	0	—	0	0	—	0	—	0	0	0	1	—	15	3	20	24	0	—	—	69
64	Oleg Berezhnoy (UKR)	0	—	—	—	—	43	0	—	—	—	—	—	0	—	—	—	—	—	—	—	—	23	—	—	—	—	66
65	Henrik L'Abée-Lund (NOR)	—	—	—	—	—	—	—	—	—	—	—	—	—	—	24	31	0	0	—	—	—	—	—	0	11	—	66
66	Tomáš Holubec (CZE)	0	4	0	0	—	—	—	—	—	9	31	22	0	—	0	—	0	0	—	—	—	0	—	—	—	—	66
67	Roland Lessing (EST)	0	0	16	16	8	0	9	12	—	0	—	—	0	—	—	—	—	—	—	—	—	0	—	—	—	—	61
68	Scott Perras (CAN)	—	—	—	0	—	10	10	7	—	0	0	0	—	—	0	—	11	0	—	7	10	0	—	0	—	—	55
69	Mattias Nilsson (SWE)	—	29	0	0	0	0	0	21	—	0	0	—	—	—	—	—	—	—	—	—	—	—	—	—	—	—	50
70	Zdeněk Vítek (CZE)	0	0	—	21	10	0	0	0	—	—	—	—	—	—	—	—	—	—	—	1	2	13	—	0	—	—	47
71	Andrejs Rastorgujevs (LAT)	0	0	—	0	—	—	—	1	—	0	18	6	21	—	—	—	—	—	—	0	—	0	—	0	—	—	46
72	Evgeniy Garanichev (RUS)	—	—	—	—	—	—	—	—	—	—	—	—	28	17	—	—	—	—	—	—	—	—	—	—	—	—	45
73	Miroslav Matiaško (SVK)	0	0	5	0	—	38	0	0	—	—	—	—	—	—	—	—	—	—	—	0	—	0	—	0	—	—	43
74	Artem Pryma (UKR)	—	—	—	—	—	—	—	—	—	0	0	0	—	—	—	—	—	—	—	—	—	16	—	26	0	—	42
75	Jay Hakkinen (USA)	—	—	—	—	—	—	—	—	—	—	—	—	—	—	13	14	0	7	—	0	6	0	—	0	—	—	40
76	Rene Laurent Vuillermoz (ITA)	—	—	—	0	0	—	—	0	—	5	0	0	—	—	4	19	2	9	—	0	0	—	—	—	—	—	39
77	Timo Antila (FIN)	—	—	—	0	—	7	18	0	—	0	0	—	10	—	—	—	—	—	—	2	0	0	—	—	—	—	37
78	Alexsandr Chervyhkov (KAZ)	0	0	—	0	7	0	—	—	—	10	0	—	0	—	—	—	—	—	—	11	0	6	—	—	—	—	34
79	Alexey Churine (RUS)	—	—	—	—	—	—	—	18	—	—	0	—	—	—	0	4	0	11	—	—	—	—	—	—	—	—	33
80	Roman Pryma (UKR)	—	—	—	0	0	—	—	0	—	0	0	—	—	—	10	0	12	10	—	—	—	—	—	—	—	—	32
81	Christian Stebler (SUI)	2	0	8	0	—	—	0	0	—	0	5	0	—	—	15	0	0	0	—	0	—	—	—	0	—	—	30
82	Friedrich Pinter (AUT)	0	0	—	0	—	—	—	13	—	7	0	0	2	—	0	0	0	8	—	—	—	—	—	—	—	—	30
83	Matej Kazar (SVK)	0	8	0	20	0	—	—	—	—	—	—	—	0	—	—	—	—	—	—	0	—	0	—	0	0	—	28
84	Indrek Tobreluts (EST)	—	0	0	0	—	0	—	0	—	0	6	0	0	—	—	—	—	—	—	0	4	17	—	0	—	—	27
85	Toni Lang (GER)	—	—	—	—	—	—	—	—	—	0	11	16	0	—	—	—	—	—	—	—	—	—	—	—	—	—	27
86	Sergey Novikov (BLR)	0	0	—	0	—	8	0	0	—	—	—	—	0	—	0	2	0	0	—	—	—	0	—	16	1	—	27
87	Simon Schempp (GER)	13	0	13	0	—	—	—	0	—	—	—	—	—	—	—	—	—	—	—	—	—	—	—	—	—	—	26
88	Jarkko Kauppinen (FIN)	—	—	—	0	—	0	11	0	—	3	12	0	0	—	0	0	0	—	—	0	0	0	—	0	—	—	26
89	Thomas Frei (SUI)	0	0	0	0	—	—	—	—	—	—	—	—	13	—	8	0	0	—	—	—	—	0	—	—	—	—	21
90	Yan Savitskiy (KAZ)	—	0	—	0	—	—	19	—	—	—	—	—	0	—	—	—	—	—	—	—	—	0	—	—	—	—	19
#	Name	ÖST IN	ÖST SP	ÖST PU	HOC SP	HOC PU	POK IN	POK SP	OBE SP	OBE MS	RUH IN	RUH SP	RUH PU	ANT SP	ANT MS	PQI SP	PQI PU	FRK SP	FRK PU	FRK MS	WCH SP	WCH PU	WCH IN	WCH MS	OSL SP	OSL PU	OSL MS	Total
91	Erik Lesser (GER)	—	—	—	—	—	—	—	—	—	—	—	—	—	—	—	—	—	—	—	—	—	—	—	1	17	—	18
92	Magnus Jonsson (SWE)	0	0	0	0	—	0	0	9	—	0	0	0	0	—	0	—	—	—	—	0	9	—	—	0	0	—	18
93	Junji Nagai (JPN)	0	—	—	0	—	0	1	0	—	2	11	3	0	—	—	—	—	—	—	0	0	0	—	0	—	—	17
94	Ren Long (CHN)	—	—	—	—	—	0	0	0	—	0	0	—	—	—	—	—	—	—	—	0	0	0	—	2	14	—	16
95	Vasja Rupnik (SLO)	—	0	0	0	—	—	0	0	—	0	0	—	6	—	—	—	—	—	—	0	0	0	—	8	0	—	14
96	Łukasz Szczurek (POL)	4	0	—	0	0	0	—	0	—	8	0	—	0	—	0	0	0	0	—	0	—	0	—	—	—	—	12
97	Paavo Puurunen (FIN)	—	—	—	5	0	—	—	—	—	0	0	—	0	—	—	—	—	—	—	5	0	0	—	—	—	—	10
98	Dušan Šimočko (SVK)	0	0	—	—	—	0	0	0	—	0	0	—	0	—	—	—	—	—	—	0	—	9	—	—	—	—	9
99	Oleksandr Batiuk (UKR)	—	0	—	4	0	—	—	—	—	0	0	—	—	—	5	0	0	—	—	—	—	—	—	—	—	—	9
100	Sven Grossegger (AUT)	—	—	—	—	—	—	—	—	—	—	—	—	—	—	6	0	0	—	—	—	—	—	—	—	—	—	6
101	Christian Martinelli (ITA)	—	—	—	—	—	5	0	—	—	—	—	—	—	—	—	—	—	—	—	—	—	—	—	—	—	—	5
102	Vladimir Chepelin (BLR)	—	—	—	—	—	—	0	0	—	0	0	—	—	—	—	—	—	—	—	0	0	—	—	5	0	—	5
103	Hidenori Isa (JPN)	0	0	0	—	—	0	0	—	—	—	0	—	—	—	—	—	—	—	—	0	0	4	—	0	—	—	4
104	Nathan Smith (CAN)	0	0	—	0	0	0	0	—	—	—	—	—	—	—	0	0	0	3	—	0	—	0	—	—	—	—	3
105	Ivan Joller (SUI)	—	—	—	—	—	—	—	0	—	0	0	—	—	—	—	—	—	—	—	—	—	—	—	0	3	—	3
106	Zhang Chengye (CHN)	0	0	—	1	0	—	—	—	—	—	—	—	—	—	—	—	—	—	—	—	—	—	—	—	—	—	1
107	Vitaliy Kilchytskyy (UKR)	—	—	—	—	—	—	—	—	—	—	—	—	—	—	0	0	1	0	—	—	—	—	—	—	—	—	1
108	Tobias Arwidson (SWE)	1	0	—	—	—	—	—	—	—	—	—	—	—	—	—	—	—	—	—	—	—	0	—	0	0	—	1
#	Name	ÖST IN	ÖST SP	ÖST PU	HOC SP	HOC PU	POK IN	POK SP	OBE SP	OBE MS	RUH IN	RUH SP	RUH PU	ANT SP	ANT MS	PQI SP	PQI PU	FRK SP	FRK PU	FRK MS	WCH SP	WCH PU	WCH IN	WCH MS	OSL SP	OSL PU	OSL MS	Total
