= Biathlon World Championships 2011 – Men's sprint =

Men's sprint at the Biathlon World Championships 2011
- Location: Khanty-Mansiysk, Russia
- Date: 5 March
- Competitors: 125 from 36 nations
- Winning time: 24:34.0

Medalists
gold medal	Arnd Peiffer	Germany
silver medal	Martin Fourcade	France
bronze medal	Tarjei Bø	Norway

The men's sprint competition of the Biathlon World Championships 2011 were held on March 5, 2011 at 14:00 local time.

== Results ==
Rank	Bib	Name	Country	Penalties (P+S)	Time	Deficit
1st place, gold medalist(s)	24	Arnd Peiffer	Germany	1 (0+1)	24:34.0	—
2nd place, silver medalist(s)	67	Martin Fourcade	France	2 (2+0)	24:47.0	+13.0
3rd place, bronze medalist(s)	39	Tarjei Bø	Norway	1 (1+0)	24:59.2	+25.2
4	79	Andrei Makoveev	Russia	0 (0+0)	25:04.0	+30.0
5	10	Emil Hegle Svendsen	Norway	2 (1+1)	25:04.4	+30.4
6	48	Andreas Birnbacher	Germany	1 (0+1)	25:05.8	+31.8
7	90	Christoph Stephan	Germany	1 (1+0)	25:08.8	+34.8
8	80	Edgars Piksons	Latvia	1 (1+0)	25:16.9	+42.9
9	36	Michael Greis	Germany	2 (1+1)	25:27.4	+53.4
10	97	Andriy Deryzemlya	Ukraine	1 (0+1)	25:28.9	+54.9
11	94	Fredrik Lindström	Sweden	1 (0+1)	25:31.5	+57.5
12	4	Michal Šlesingr	Czech Republic	1 (1+0)	25:32.9	+58.9
13	99	Simon Fourcade	France	1 (0+1)	25:33.2	+59.2
14	78	Lars Berger	Norway	2 (1+1)	25:37.7	+1:03.7
15	22	Klemen Bauer	Slovenia	2 (1+1)	25:37.8	+1:03.8
16	14	Lukas Hofer	Italy	3 (2+1)	25:38.4	+1:04.4
17	27	Simon Eder	Austria	1 (0+1)	25:38.7	+1:04.7
18	72	Markus Windisch	Italy	1 (1+0)	25:44.6	+1:10.6
19	62	Ivan Tcherezov	Russia	2 (1+1)	25:50.0	+1:16.0
20	71	Ilmārs Bricis	Latvia	1 (1+0)	25:50.3	+1:16.3
21	31	Christian de Lorenzi	Italy	1 (0+1)	25:54.9	+1:20.9
22	53	Ole Einar Bjørndalen	Norway	2 (0+2)	25:55.9	+1:21.9
23	35	Björn Ferry	Sweden	2 (1+1)	25:56.2	+1:22.2
24	30	Simon Hallenbarter	Switzerland	1 (0+1)	25:58.7	+1:24.7
25	12	Olexander Bilanenko	Ukraine	1 (0+1)	26:00.7	+1:26.7
26	108	Leif Nordgren	United States	1 (0+1)	26:03.0	+1:29.0
27	77	Christoph Sumann	Austria	2 (2+0)	26:03.2	+1:29.2
28	59	Serhiy Semenov	Ukraine	2 (2+0)	26:11.4	+1:37.4
29	66	Evgeny Ustyugov	Russia	2 (1+1)	26:12.4	+1:38.4
30	33	Alexsandr Chervyhkov	Kazakhstan	1 (0+1)	26:15.1	+1:41.1
31	3	Tim Burke	United States	3 (2+1)	26:15.2	+1:41.2
32	52	Lowell Bailey	United States	1 (0+1)	26:16.0	+1:42.0
33	46	Serguei Sednev	Ukraine	2 (0+2)	26:26.0	+1:52.0
34	87	Scott Perras	Canada	1 (0+1)	26:29.9	+1:55.9
35	102	Matthias Simmen	Switzerland	2 (0+2)	26:33.4	+1:59.4
36	49	Paavo Puurunen	Finland	2 (0+2)	26:36.8	+2:02.8
37	13	Anton Shipulin	Russia	3 (1+2)	26:36.9	+2:02.9
38	85	Daniel Mesotitsch	Austria	2 (1+1)	26:39.1	+2:05.1
39	34	Timo Antila	Finland	2 (1+1)	26:39.3	+2:05.3
40	95	Zdeněk Vítek	Czech Republic	2 (1+1)	26:39.6	+2:05.6
41	63	Janez Marič	Slovenia	3 (2+1)	26:40.1	+2:06.1
42	96	Jay Hakkinen	United States	1 (0+1)	26:49.8	+2:15.8
43	69	Indrek Tobreluts	Estonia	3 (1+2)	26:51.3	+2:17.3
44	20	Ren Long	China	2 (1+1)	26:52.0	+2:18.0
45	8	Vincent Jay	France	1 (0+1)	26:53.2	+2:19.2
46	65	Jean-Philippe Leguellec	Canada	3 (2+1)	26:53.4	+2:19.4
47	43	Carl Johan Bergman	Sweden	4 (0+4)	26:55.9	+2:21.9
48	32	Lee-Steve Jackson	Great Britain	2 (1+1)	26:58.5	+2:24.5
49	109	Dominik Landertinger	Austria	3 (2+1)	27:01.2	+2:27.2
50	26	Michail Kletcherov	Bulgaria	2 (1+1)	27:02.1	+2:28.1
51	118	Magnús Jónsson	Sweden	3 (1+2)	27:04.8	+2:30.8
52	58	Benjamin Weger	Switzerland	2 (1+1)	27:07.5	+2:33.5
53	84	Rene Laurent Vuillermoz	Italy	4 (2+2)	27:07.6	+2:33.6
54	18	Hidenori Isa	Japan	3 (1+2)	27:09.2	+2:35.2
55	57	Junji Nagai	Japan	2 (0+2)	27:09.5	+2:35.5
56	89	Vasja Rupnik	Slovenia	3 (1+2)	27:10.7	+2:36.7
57	83	Marcel Laponder	Great Britain	0 (0+0)	27:12.9	+2:38.9
58	101	Jarkko Kauppinen	Finland	2 (1+1)	27:18.2	+2:44.2
59	114	Vladimir Chepelin	Belarus	3 (1+2)	27:21.6	+2:47.6
60	44	Tomas Kaukėnas	Lithuania	2 (0+2)	27:22.4	+2:48.4
61	92	Kazuya Inomata	Japan	3 (1+2)	27:23.3	+2:49.3
62	112	Christian Stebler	Switzerland	5 (1+4)	27:25.3	+2:51.3
63	88	Vladimir Alenishko	Belarus	3 (0+3)	27:29.7	+2:55.7
64	86	Sergey Naumik	Kazakhstan	1 (0+1)	27:31.2	+2:57.2
65	98	Karol Dombrovski	Lithuania	1 (0+1)	27:31.5	+2:57.5
66	6	Andrejs Rastorgujevs	Latvia	4 (1+3)	27:39.8	+3:05.8
67	123	Nathan Smith	Canada	4 (1+3)	27:41.1	+3:07.1
68	60	Vladimir Iliev	Bulgaria	3 (1+2)	27:42.4	+3:08.4
69	64	Rustam Valiullin	Belarus	4 (2+2)	27:43.9	+3:09.9
70	42	Alexis Bœuf	France	4 (0+4)	27:44.0	+3:10.0
71	28	Kauri Koiv	Estonia	3 (0+3)	27:44.8	+3:10.8
72	25	Karolis Zlatkauskas	Lithuania	2 (1+1)	27:53.2	+3:19.2
72	40	Alexei Almoukov	Australia	3 (3+0)	27:53.2	+3:19.2
72	75	Pete Beyer	Great Britain	1 (0+1)	27:53.2	+3:19.2
75	115	Loïs Habert	France	4 (2+2)	27:56.8	+3:22.8
76	16	Jaroslav Soukup	Czech Republic	4 (2+2)	27:58.2	+3:24.2
77	110	Priit Narusk	Estonia	3 (1+2)	27:58.8	+3:24.8
78	5	Matej Kazár	Slovakia	5 (3+2)	27:59.2	+3:25.2
79	70	Li Zhonghai	China	3 (1+2)	28:05.1	+3:31.1
80	82	Martin Bogdanov	Bulgaria	3 (1+2)	28:08.6	+3:34.6
81	9	Milanko Petrović	Serbia	4 (2+2)	28:10.4	+3:36.4
82	54	Ondřej Moravec	Czech Republic	5 (1+4)	28:13.1	+3:39.1
83	107	Satoru Abe	Japan	4 (3+1)	28:14.7	+3:40.7
84	17	Krzysztof Plywaczyk	Poland	3 (1+2)	28:15.5	+3:41.5
85	55	Dias Keneshev	Kazakhstan	2 (0+2)	28:20.9	+3:46.9
86	11	Evgeny Abramenko	Belarus	4 (2+2)	28:21.2	+3:47.2
87	111	Ahti Toivanen	Finland	2 (0+2)	28:24.2	+3:50.2
88	120	Dušan Šimočko	Slovakia	4 (2+2)	28:26.5	+3:52.5
89	81	Lee Jung-sik	South Korea	1 (0+1)	28:28.5	+3:54.5
90	91	Miroslav Matiaško	Slovakia	3 (1+2)	28:28.9	+3:54.9
91	37	Brendan Green	Canada	5 (3+2)	28:30.1	+3:56.1
92	21	Lee Su-young	South Korea	2 (0+2)	28:40.3	+4:06.3
93	61	Łukasz Szczurek	Poland	3 (2+1)	28:43.6	+4:09.6
94	116	Miroslav Kenanov	Bulgaria	2 (1+1)	28:47.8	+4:13.8
95	125	Toms Praulitis	Latvia	1 (1+0)	29:00.1	+4:26.1
96	73	Pavol Hurajt	Slovakia	5 (2+3)	29:05.3	+4:31.3
97	104	Mirosław Kobus	Poland	4 (1+3)	29:08.2	+4:34.2
98	122	Grzegorz Bril	Poland	3 (0+3)	29:10.9	+4:36.9
99	7	Roland Gerbacea	Romania	3 (0+3)	29:12.9	+4:38.9
100	41	Damir Rastić	Serbia	3 (1+2)	29:14.0	+4:40.0
101	121	Peter Dokl	Slovenia	4 (1+3)	29:14.9	+4:40.9
102	19	Øystein Slettemark	Greenland	4 (1+3)	29:15.7	+4:41.7
103	50	Jun Je-uk	South Korea	4 (3+1)	29:24.4	+4:50.4
104	100	Priit Viks	Estonia	6 (3+3)	29:32.8	+4:58.8
105	103	Edin Hodžić	Serbia	3 (3+0)	29:40.2	+5:06.2
106	106	Alexandr Trifonov	Kazakhstan	2 (1+1)	29:43.8	+5:09.8
107	113	Aleksandr Lavrinovič	Lithuania	3 (2+1)	29:44.1	+5:10.1
108	2	Ahmet Ustuntas	Turkey	2 (0+2)	29:52.4	+5:18.4
109	15	Károly Gombos	Hungary	3 (1+2)	29:58.6	+5:24.6
110	124	Lee Kwang-ro	South Korea	3 (1+2)	30:02.2	+5:28.2
111	1	Zvonimir Tadejević	Croatia	2 (2+0)	30:09.5	+5:35.5
112	47	Nemanja Košarac	Bosnia and Herzegovina	5 (4+1)	30:20.3	+5:46.3
113	68	Aqqaluartaa Olsen	Greenland	7 (4+3)	30:27.1	+5:53.1
114	23	Victor Pînzaru	Moldova	4 (2+2)	30:37.0	+6:03.0
115	76	Remus Faur	Romania	2 (1+1)	30:37.1	+6:03.1
116	29	Darko Damjanovski	Macedonia	6 (3+3)	30:47.1	+6:13.1
117	56	István Muskatal	Hungary	4 (2+2)	31:05.5	+6:31.5
118	119	Simon Allanson	Great Britain	6 (3+3)	31:07.9	+6:33.9
119	74	Gjorgji Icoski	Macedonia	4 (2+2)	31:08.2	+6:34.2
120	105	Kristian Kristoffersen	Greenland	4 (3+1)	31:19.1	+6:45.1
121	117	Nikola Jeremić	Serbia	3 (2+1)	31:35.5	+7:01.5
122	51	Dino Butković	Croatia	1 (0+1)	31:36.1	+7:02.1
123	45	Recep Efe	Turkey	4 (0+4)	31:52.2	+7:18.2
124	93	Tomislav Crnković	Croatia	4 (1+3)	33:06.6	+8:32.6
125	38	Stefan Lopatić	Bosnia and Herzegovina	8 (5+3)	35:08.6	+10:34.6
