= Biathlon World Championships 2011 – Men's relay =

Men's relay at the Biathlon World Championships 2011
- Date: 11 March 2011
- Competitors: 104 from 26 nations
- Winning time: 1:16:13.9

Medalists
gold medal	Ole Einar Bjørndalen; Alexander Os; Emil Hegle Svendsen; Tarjei Bø	Norway
silver medal	Olexander Bilanenko; Andriy Deryzemlya; Serhiy Semenov; Serhiy Sednev	Ukraine
bronze medal	Fredrik Lindström; Magnus Jonsson; Carl Johan Bergman; Björn Ferry	Sweden

The Men's relay of the Biathlon World Championships 2011 was held on March 11, 2011 at 14:00. Twenty-six nations participated.

== Results ==
Rank	Bib	Team	Time	Penalties (P+S)	Deficit
1st place, gold medalist(s)	2	Norway; Ole Einar Bjørndalen; Alexander Os; Emil Hegle Svendsen; Tarjei Bø	1:16:13.9; 19:12.7; 19:16.3; 18:31.5; 19:13.4	0+2 2+8; 0+0 0+0; 0+0 1+3; 0+1 0+2; 0+1 1+3	
2nd place, silver medalist(s)	6	Ukraine; Olexander Bilanenko; Andriy Deryzemlya; Serhiy Semenov; Serhiy Sednev	1:16:41.9; 19:40.6; 19:00.1; 18:57.5; 19:03.7	0+4 0+6; 0+1 0+2; 0+1 0+2; 0+0 0+1; 0+2 0+1	+28.0
3rd place, bronze medalist(s)	7	Sweden; Fredrik Lindström; Magnus Jonsson; Carl Johan Bergman; Björn Ferry	1:16:45.7; 19:27.9; 19:19.6; 18:52.1; 19:06.1	0+5 0+10; 0+1 0+2; 0+0 0+3; 0+2 0+3; 0+2 0+2	+31.8
4	5	Italy; Christian De Lorenzi; Rene Laurent Vuillermoz; Lukas Hofer; Markus Windisch	1:16:52.0; 19:53.9; 19:25.8; 18:18.6; 19:13.7	0+5 1+6; 0+2 0+2; 0+1 0+1; 0+1 0+0; 0+1 1+3	+38.1
5	14	United States; Lowell Bailey; Jay Hakkinen; Tim Burke; Leif Nordgren	1:16:52.0; 19:36.2; 19:31.8; 18:55.6; 18:48.4	0+6 0+8; 0+1 0+2; 0+3 0+2; 0+0 0+2; 0+2 0+2	+38.1
6	1	Germany; Christoph Stephan; Andreas Birnbacher; Arnd Peiffer; Michael Greis	1:17:05.3; 19:33.6; 18:55.5; 18:31.1; 20:05.1	3+10 0+6; 0+3 0+2; 0+3 0+0; 0+1 0+1; 3+3 0+3	+51.4
7	8	Slovenia; Peter Dokl; Janez Marič; Vasja Rupnik; Klemen Bauer	1:17:22.9; 20:24.4; 18:47.5; 19:17.7; 18:53.3	0+2 1+5; 0+1 0+2; 0+1 0+0; 0+0 0+0; 0+0 1+3	+1:09.0
8	3	Austria; Simon Eder; Dominik Landertinger; Daniel Mesotitsch; Christoph Sumann	1:17:31.8; 20:14.1; 18:56.0; 19:38.4; 18:43.3	0+4 1+6; 0+0 1+3; 0+1 0+0; 0+3 0+2; 0+0 0+1	+1:17.9
9	11	Czech Republic; Jaroslav Soukup; Zdeněk Vítek; Ondřej Moravec; Michal Šlesingr	1:17:44.8; 19:55.0; 19:20.1; 20:07.5; 18:22.2	0+4 0+9; 0+0 0+3; 0+0 0+3; 0+2 0+2; 0+2 0+1	+1:30.9
10	22	Canada; Brendan Green; Scott Perras; Jean-Philippe Leguellec; Nathan Smith	1:17:50.5; 19:54.4; 19:16.6; 19:07.9; 19:31.6	0+4 0+2; 0+1 0+0; 0+2 0+0; 0+1 0+0; 0+0 0+2	+1:36.6
11	4	France; Vincent Jay; Simon Fourcade; Alexis Bœuf; Martin Fourcade	1:18:15.4; 20:34.7; 18:52.2; 20:19.4; 18:29.1	0+1 0+5; 0+1 0+1; 0+0 0+1; 0+0 0+3; 0+0 0+0	+2:01.5
12	12	Belarus; Sergey Novikov; Vladimir Chepelin; Vladimir Alenishko; Evgeny Abramenko	1:18:54.3; 20:04.3; 19:36.2; 19:22.4; 19:51.4	0+7 0+5; 0+0 0+1; 0+2 0+2; 0+2 0+0; 0+3 0+2	+2:40.4
13	23	Latvia; Edgars Piksons; Ilmārs Bricis; Andrejs Rastorgujevs; Jānis Bērziņš	1:19:17.8; 19:39.9; 18:58.3; 19:17.1; 21:22.5	0+5 0+5; 0+1 0+2; 0+0 0+1; 0+1 0+1; 0+3 0+1	+3:03.9
14	20	Estonia; Roland Lessing; Indrek Tobreluts; Kauri Kõiv; Priit Viks	1:19:27.5; 20:26.0; 18:58.6; 20:34.8; 19:28.1	0+6 0+6; 0+2 0+2; 0+1 0+0; 0+2 0+3; 0+1 0+1	+3:13.6
15	16	Bulgaria; Michail Kletcherov; Martin Bogdanov; Vladimir Iliev; Krasimir Anev	1:19:37.4; 20:57.3; 20:11.6; 19:38.5; 18:50.0	0+1 2+5; 0+0 2+3; 0+0 0+2; 0+1 0+0; 0+0 0+0	+3:23.5
16	10	Switzerland; Benjamin Weger; Thomas Frei; Matthias Simmen; Simon Hallenbarter	1:20:06.6; 19:57.5; 20:59.6; 19:41.6; 19:27.9	2+4 0+7; 0+1 0+3; 2+3 0+0; 0+0 0+2; 0+0 0+2	+3:52.7
17	19	Slovakia; Miroslav Matiaško; Pavol Hurajt; Martin Otcenas; Dušan Šimočko	1:20:31.6; 21:04.4; 19:05.9; 21:07.4; 19:13.9	0+6 1+8; 0+2 0+3; 0+0 0+1; 0+2 1+3; 0+2 0+1	+4:17.7
18	17	Finland; Timo Antila; Paavo Puurunen; Ahti Toivanen; Jarkko Kauppinen	1:20:35.7; 20:54.1; 19:42.2; 20:24.6; 19:34.8	0+5 2+7; 0+1 2+3; 0+1 0+2; 0+0 0+2; 0+3 0+0	+4:21.8
19	13	Japan; Junji Nagai; Hidenori Isa; Satoru Abe; Kazuya Inomata	1:20:55.3; 19:56.6; 20:03.7; 21:08.1; 19:46.9	1+6 0+3; 0+0 0+0; 0+2 0+2; 1+3 0+0; 0+1 0+1	+4:41.4
20	15	Poland; Mirosław Kobus; Łukasz Szczurek; Grzegorz Bril; Krzysztof Plywaczyk	1:22:28.3; 21:04.9; 20:29.2; 20:13.9; 20:40.3	0+2 0+7; 0+0 0+2; 0+0 0+1; 0+0 0+2; 0+2 0+2	+6:14.4
21	18	Kazakhstan; Alexsandr Chervyhkov; Nikolay Braichenko; Dias Keneshev; Sergey Naumik	1:24:12.9; 20:22.6; 19:48.5; 22:10.2; 21:51.6	1+7 4+8; 0+0 0+1; 0+2 0+1; 0+2 2+3; 1+3 2+3	+7:59.0
22	21	Great Britain; Lee-Steve Jackson; Marcel Laponder; Pete Beyer; Simon Allanson	LAP; 20:06.0; 21:39.9; 21:09.4	0+2 0+6; 0+0 0+1; 0+2 0+1; 0+0 0+1; 0+0 0+3	LAP
23	24	South Korea; Jun Je-uk; Lee Su-young; Lee Jung-sik; Lee Kwang-ro	LAP; 20:25.0; 21:39.7; 21:53.3	0+5 1+10; 0+0 0+3; 0+3 0+3; 0+0 1+3; 0+2 0+1	LAP
24	26	Lithuania; Tomas Kaukėnas; Karol Dombrovski; Karolis Zlatkauskas; Aleksandr Lavrinovič	LAP; 20:11.0; 22:43.4; 20:50.4	4+7 1+9; 0+0 0+3; 4+3 0+0; 0+1 0+3; 0+3 1+3	LAP
25	25	Serbia; Milanko Petrović; Damir Rastić; Edin Hodžić; Nikola Jeremić	LAP; 22:12.7; 22:00.0; 22:26.3	2+9 2+11; 0+3 1+3; 0+2 0+3; 0+1 0+2; 2+3 1+3	LAP
DSQ	9	Russia; Anton Shipulin; Evgeny Ustyugov; Maxim Maksimov; Ivan Tcherezov	1:16:27.3; 19:32.8; 18:56.9; 18:59.9; 18:57.7	0+5 0+3; 0+1 0+1; 0+0 0+2; 0+1 0+0; 0+3 0+0	+13.4
