= 2010–11 Biathlon World Cup – Pursuit Men =

The 2010–11 Biathlon World Cup – Pursuit Men will start at Sunday December 5, 2009 in Östersund and will finish Saturday March 19, 2011 in Oslo. Defending titlist is Martin Fourcade of France.

== Competition format ==
This is a pursuit competition. The biathletes' starts are separated by their time differences from a previous race, most commonly a sprint race. The contestants ski a distance of 12.5 kilometres (7.8 mi) over five laps. On four of the laps, the contestants shoot at targets; each miss requires the contestant to ski a penalty loop of 150 metres (490 ft). There are two prone shooting bouts and two standing bouts, in that order. The contestant crossing the finish line first is the winner.

To prevent awkward and/or dangerous crowding of the skiing loops, and overcapacity at the shooting range, World Cup Pursuits are held with only the 60 top ranking biathletes after the preceding race. The biathletes shoot (on a first-come, first-served basis) at the lane corresponding to the position they arrived for all shooting bouts.

Points are awarded for each event, according to each contestant's finish. When all events are completed. the contestant with the highest number of points is declared the season winner.

== 2010–11 Top 3 Standings ==
Medal	Athlete	Points
Gold:	(France) Martin Fourcade	197
Silver:	(Austria) Simon Eder	196
Bronze:	(Russia) Ivan Tcherezov	189

== Medal winners ==
Event:	Gold:	Time	Silver:	Time	Bronze:	Time
Östersund details	Ole Einar Bjørndalen; Norway	35:47.7 (0+0+1+1)	Emil Hegle Svendsen; Norway	36:13.9 (0+0+1+2)	Jakov Fak; Slovenia	36:48.4 (1+2+0+0)
Hochfilzen details	Tarjei Bø; Norway	36:32.4 (0+0+0+1)	Simon Eder; Austria	37:11.1 (0+0+0+0)	Ivan Tcherezov; Russia	37:12.4 (1+0+0+1)
Ruhpolding details	Björn Ferry; Sweden	31:56.6 (0+0+0+0)	Martin Fourcade; France	32:01.5 (0+1+1+0)	Michael Greis; Germany	32:03.5 (0+0+0+0)
Presque Isle details	Alexis Bœuf; France	36:02.4 (0+1+0+1)	Ivan Tcherezov; Russia	36:12.7 (1+1+2+0)	Carl Johan Bergman; Sweden	36:16.7 (1+0+0+2)
Fort Kent details	Emil Hegle Svendsen; Norway	35:46.0 (0+0+0+1)	Martin Fourcade; France	35:46.0 (0+0+1+0)	Tarjei Bø; Norway	37:03.5 (1+0+0+2)
World Championships 2011 details	Martin Fourcade; France	33:02.6 (0+1+2+0)	Emil Hegle Svendsen; Norway	33:06.4 (0+0+1+1)	Tarjei Bø; Norway	33:07.8 (0+0+1+1)
Oslo details	Emil Hegle Svendsen; Norway	32:59.2 (0+2+1+0)	Tarjei Bø; Norway	32:59.8 (0+0+1+0)	Martin Fourcade; France	33:06.5 (1+0+0+0)

== Standings ==
#	Name	ÖST	HOC	RUH	PRI	FRK	WCH	OSL	Total
1	Tarjei Bø (NOR)	43	60	43	38	48	48	54	334
2	Martin Fourcade (FRA)	40	28	54	36	54	60	48	320
3	Emil Hegle Svendsen (NOR)	54	40	36	—	60	54	60	304
4	Ivan Tcherezov (RUS)	—	48	40	54	34	23	30	229
5	Simon Eder (AUT)	24	54	29	—	13	27	36	183
6	Carl Johan Bergman (SWE)	—	25	28	48	40	13	24	178
7	Björn Ferry (SWE)	12	31	60	—	—	31	43	177
8	Arnd Peiffer (GER)	23	19	24	43	—	43	23	175
9	Michal Šlesingr (CZE)	27	9	15	21	43	34	26	175
10	Michael Greis (GER)	26	34	48	—	—	30	34	172
11	Alexis Bœuf (FRA)	21	32	2	60	19	—	18	152
12	Lukas Hofer (ITA)	36	30	14	34	5	32	0	151
13	Andreas Birnbacher (GER)	34	0	—	32	36	40	—	142
14	Christoph Sumann (AUT)	—	38	18	—	38	19	28	141
15	Evgeny Ustyugov (RUS)	19	43	10	—	—	29	32	133
16	Simon Fourcade (FRA)	—	—	34	29	—	38	21	122
17	Fredrik Lindström (SWE)	—	0	23	20	20	16	40	119
18	Lars Berger (NOR)	14	6	38	—	—	22	38	118
19	Alexander Os (NOR)	30	5	7	18	32	—	22	114
20	Ole Einar Bjørndalen (NOR)	60	36	—	—	—	17	—	113
21	Anton Shipulin (RUS)	38	21	—	—	—	20	31	110
22	Christian De Lorenzi (ITA)	25	0	20	28	15	18	—	106
23	Jakov Fak (CRO)	48	—	—	26	25	—	—	99
24	Serguei Sednev (UKR)	32	12	—	17	24	14	—	99
25	Maxim Tchoudov (RUS)	0	27	30	40	—	—	—	97
26	Markus Windisch (ITA)	10	—	8	22	18	28	6	92
27	Andrei Makoveev (RUS)	—	—	31	8	27	24	—	90
28	Christoph Stephan (GER)	4	18	32	0	dsq	25	5	84
29	Klemen Bauer (SLO)	1	20	11	7	31	7	—	77
30	Vincent Jay (FRA)	7	14	25	30	—	0	—	76
31	Tomasz Sikora (POL)	—	24	—	24	28	—	—	76
32	Daniel Böhm (GER)	—	—	26	9	30	—	8	73
33	Andriy Deryzemlya (UKR)	11	—	21	—	—	36	0	68
34	Tim Burke (USA)	9	22	5	—	0	11	19	66
35	Maxim Maksimov (RUS)	31	—	—	12	21	—	—	64
36	Simon Hallenbarter (SUI)	2	—	19	27	4	12	0	64
37	Daniel Mesotitsch (AUT)	3	29	—	—	—	15	15	62
38	Alexander Wolf (GER)	29	15	0	—	14	—	2	60
39	Julian Eberhard (AUT)	—	—	—	23	26	—	10	59
40	Tobias Eberhard (AUT)	0	16	17	1	—	—	25	59
41	Lowell Bailey (USA)	0	2	12	25	16	0	—	55
42	Jaroslav Soukup (CZE)	0	11	13	11	13	—	—	48
43	Serhiy Semenov (UKR)	6	1	—	—	—	26	13	46
44	Pavol Hurajt (SVK)	0	17	0	—	—	—	27	44
45	Ondřej Moravec (CZE)	—	—	27	—	—	—	16	43
46	Lois Habert (FRA)	0	0	9	13	17	—	4	43
47	Henrik L'Abée-Lund (NOR)	—	—	—	31	0	—	11	42
48	Alexey Volkov (RUS)	18	4	—	—	—	—	20	42
49	Rune Brattsveen (NOR)	—	—	—	10	22	—	9	41
50	Jean-Guillaume Béatrix (FRA)	—	0	—	15	23	—	—	38
51	Benjamin Weger (SUI)	0	0	0	0	29	8	—	37
52	Jean-Philippe Leguellec (CAN)	28	0	—	6	0	0	—	34
53	Olexander Bilanenko (UKR)	20	—	—	—	—	0	12	32
54	Matthias Simmen (SUI)	15	13	0	3	0	0	—	31
55	Florian Graf (GER)	—	—	—	—	—	—	29	29
56	Evgeny Abramenko (BLR)	22	—	—	—	—	—	7	29
57	Rene Laurent Vuillermoz (ITA)	—	0	0	19	9	0	—	28
58	Krasimir Anev (BUL)	—	23	4	—	—	—	0	27
59	Jay Hakkinen (USA)	—	—	—	14	7	6	—	27
60	Dominik Landertinger (AUT)	—	26	—	—	—	0	—	26
61	Roland Lessing (EST)	16	8	—	—	—	—	—	24
62	Tomáš Holubec (CZE)	0	—	22	—	0	—	—	22
63	Ilmārs Bricis (LAT)	17	—	0	—	—	5	0	22
64	Edgars Piksons (LAT)	—	0	0	—	—	21	—	21
65	Erik Lesser (GER)	—	—	—	—	—	—	17	17
66	Michail Kletcherov (BUL)	—	0	0	16	0	1	—	17
67	Toni Lang (GER)	—	—	16	—	—	—	—	16
68	Alexey Churine (RUS)	—	—	—	4	11	—	—	15
69	Ren Long (CHN)	—	—	—	—	—	0	14	14
70	Simon Schempp (GER)	13	—	—	—	—	—	—	13
71	Zdeněk Vítek (CZE)	—	10	—	—	—	2	—	12
72	Scott Perras (CAN)	—	—	0	—	0	10	—	10
73	Roman Pryma (UKR)	—	0	—	0	10	—	—	10
74	Magnús Jónsson (SWE)	0	—	0	—	—	9	0	9
75	Janez Maric (SLO)	0	3	—	—	6	0	0	9
76	Friedrich Pinter (AUT)	—	—	0	0	8	—	—	8
77	Christian Stebler (SUI)	8	—	0	0	0	—	—	8
78	Brendan Green (CAN)	—	0	1	5	2	—	—	8
79	Alexsandr Chervyhkov (KAZ)	—	7	—	—	—	0	—	7
80	Andrejs Rastorgujevs (LAT)	—	—	6	—	—	—	—	6
81	Miroslav Matiaško (SVK)	5	—	—	—	—	—	—	5
82	Indrek Tobreluts (EST)	0	—	0	—	—	4	—	4
83	Leif Nordgren (USA)	—	—	—	0	1	3	—	4
84	Nathan Smith (CAN)	—	0	—	0	3	—	—	3
85	Junji Nagai (JPN)	—	—	3	—	—	0	—	3
86	Ivan Joller (SUI)	—	—	—	—	—	—	3	3
87	Sergey Novikov (BLR)	—	—	—	2	0	—	1	3
