= Biathlon World Championships 2011 – Men's individual =

Men's individual at the Biathlon World Championships 2011
- Location: Khanty-Mansiysk, Russia
- Date: 8 March
- Competitors: 123 from 36 nations
- Winning time: 48:29.9

Medalists
gold medal	Tarjei Bø	Norway
silver medal	Maxim Maksimov	Russia
bronze medal	Christoph Sumann	Austria

The men's individual competition at the Biathlon World Championships 2011 was held on 8 March 2011.

== Result ==
The race was started at 17:15.

Rank	Bib	Name	Country	Penalties (P+S+P+S)	Time	Deficit
1st place, gold medalist(s)	23	Tarjei Bø	Norway	1 (0+0+1+0)	48:29.9	
2nd place, silver medalist(s)	49	Maxim Maksimov	Russia	0 (0+0+0+0)	49:09.9	+40.0
3rd place, bronze medalist(s)	78	Christoph Sumann	Austria	1 (0+0+0+1)	49:15.4	+45.5
4	37	Emil Hegle Svendsen	Norway	2 (0+2+0+0)	49:19.6	+49.7
5	27	Björn Ferry	Sweden	1 (0+1+0+0)	49:46.8	+1:16.9
6	73	Ole Einar Bjørndalen	Norway	1 (0+0+0+1)	49:54.2	+1:24.3
7	3	Michael Greis	Germany	1 (0+1+0+0)	49:55.4	+1:25.5
8	71	Andreas Birnbacher	Germany	1 (1+0+0+0)	49:57.4	+1:27.5
9	97	Maxim Tchoudov	Russia	0 (0+0+0+0)	50:10.6	+1:40.7
10	44	Martin Fourcade	France	3 (0+0+1+2)	50:16.1	+1:46.2
11	5	Carl Johan Bergman	Sweden	2 (0+2+0+0)	50:20.5	+1:50.6
12	34	Michal Šlesingr	Czech Republic	2 (0+0+1+1)	50:30.3	+2:00.4
13	11	Evgeny Ustyugov	Russia	1 (0+1+0+0)	50:33.9	+2:04.0
14	21	Andriy Deryzemlya	Ukraine	2 (0+1+1+0)	50:41.3	+2:11.4
15	25	Arnd Peiffer	Germany	3 (0+0+2+1)	50:47.0	+2:17.1
16	108	Dominik Landertinger	Austria	1 (0+0+0+1)	50:54.8	+2:24.9
17	8	Simon Eder	Austria	2 (1+1+0+0)	50:55.4	+2:25.5
18	84	Oleg Berezhnoy	Ukraine	0 (0+0+0+0)	50:57.1	+2:27.2
19	95	Vincent Jay	France	0 (0+0+0+0)	50:57.8	+2:27.9
20	50	Serhiy Semenov	Ukraine	2 (0+0+0+2)	51:12.2	+2:42.3
21	119	Leif Nordgren	United States	1 (0+0+0+1)	51:21.1	+2:51.2
22	6	Ivan Tcherezov	Russia	4 (1+0+1+2)	51:43.0	+3:13.1
23	72	Pavol Hurajt	Slovakia	2 (0+1+0+1)	51:46.1	+3:16.2
24	42	Indrek Tobreluts	Estonia	2 (0+0+0+2)	51:47.7	+3:17.8
25	12	Artem Pryma	Ukraine	2 (2+0+0+0)	51:55.3	+3:25.4
26	62	Evgeny Abramenko	Belarus	2 (0+0+1+1)	51:55.8	+3:25.9
27	39	Lukas Hofer	Italy	4 (1+2+1+0)	52:02.7	+3:32.8
28	53	Zdeněk Vítek	Czech Republic	2 (0+2+0+0)	52:02.9	+3:33.0
29	82	Daniel Böhm	Germany	2 (0+1+0+1)	52:03.2	+3:33.3
30	75	Tim Burke	United States	3 (1+1+0+1)	52:13.9	+3:44.0
31	76	Janez Marič	Slovenia	3 (0+2+0+1)	52:16.7	+3:46.8
32	89	Dušan Šimočko	Slovakia	1 (0+1+0+0)	52:31.6	+4:01.7
33	18	Christian de Lorenzi	Italy	3 (1+1+1+0)	52:37.8	+4:07.9
34	2	Benjamin Weger	Switzerland	3 (0+2+0+1)	52:41.9	+4:12.0
35	1	Alexsandr Chervyhkov	Kazakhstan	3 (0+1+0+2)	52:46.9	+4:17.0
36	63	Michail Kletcherov	Bulgaria	1 (0+0+0+1)	52:58.1	+4:28.2
37	19	Hidenori Isa	Japan	2 (1+0+0+1)	53:04.7	+4:34.8
38	14	Edgars Piksons	Latvia	4 (1+0+1+2)	53:15.6	+4:45.7
39	16	Simon Fourcade	France	3 (0+2+0+1)	53:17.7	+4:47.8
40	28	Klemen Bauer	Slovenia	5 (1+3+1+0)	53:18.2	+4:48.3
41	51	Roland Lessing	Estonia	3 (1+1+0+1)	53:22.1	+4:52.2
42	47	Simon Hallenbarter	Switzerland	3 (0+1+1+1)	53:26.3	+4:56.4
43	93	Andrejs Rastorgujevs	Latvia	3 (0+0+1+2)	53:26.8	+4:56.9
43	123	Alexander Os	Norway	3 (1+1+0+1)	53:26.8	+4:56.9
45	7	Timo Antila	Finland	4 (0+3+0+1)	53:28.9	+4:59.0
46	120	Peter Dokl	Slovenia	1 (1+0+0+0)	53:29.1	+4:59.2
47	4	Lee-Steve Jackson	Great Britain	3 (0+0+1+2)	53:31.9	+5:02.0
48	38	Ren Long	China	2 (1+0+1+0)	53:34.9	+5:05.0
49	29	Scott Perras	Canada	3 (2+1+0+0)	53:37.4	+5:07.5
50	85	Daniel Mesotitsch	Austria	4 (0+2+0+2)	53:51.4	+5:21.5
51	20	Krasimir Anev	Bulgaria	3 (0+0+1+2)	53:57.9	+5:28.0
52	111	Grzegorz Bril	Poland	2 (0+0+1+1)	54:08.2	+5:38.3
53	103	Vladimir Alenishko	Belarus	2 (0+1+1+0)	54:13.5	+5:43.6
54	48	Paavo Puurunen	Finland	4 (0+2+0+2)	54:13.7	+5:43.8
55	79	Tomáš Holubec	Czech Republic	2 (0+0+2+0)	54:17.0	+5:47.1
56	105	Dominik Windisch	Italy	4 (0+1+2+1)	54:20.0	+5:50.1
57	114	Rustam Valiullin	Belarus	3 (0+3+0+0)	54:22.7	+5:52.8
58	56	Ilmārs Bricis	Latvia	5 (0+1+2+2)	54:22.9	+5:53.0
59	83	Vladimir Iliev	Bulgaria	4 (1+0+1+2)	54:31.1	+6:01.2
60	30	Alexei Almoukov	Australia	2 (0+1+0+1)	54:37.0	+6:07.1
61	74	Fredrik Lindström	Sweden	5 (1+2+0+2)	54:38.0	+6:08.1
62	26	Sergey Novikov	Belarus	3 (1+0+1+1)	54:38.3	+6:08.4
63	98	Matthias Simmen	Switzerland	4 (2+1+1+0)	54:46.2	+6:16.3
64	70	Brendan Green	Canada	4 (3+0+0+1)	55:01.6	+6:31.7
65	99	Lars Berger	Norway	5 (1+1+1+2)	55:09.3	+6:39.4
66	91	Mirosław Kobus	Poland	2 (1+0+0+1)	55:09.8	+6:39.9
67	86	Tobias Arwidson	Sweden	3 (2+0+1+0)	55:26.6	+6:56.7
68	24	Krzysztof Plywaczyk	Poland	3 (2+0+0+1)	55:33.7	+7:03.8
69	113	Martin Bogdanov	Bulgaria	3 (0+0+3+0)	55:34.9	+7:05.0
70	100	Jarkko Kauppinen	Finland	4 (0+1+0+3)	55:43.4	+7:13.5
71	43	Roland Gerbacea	Romania	2 (0+1+0+1)	55:53.0	+7:23.1
72	64	Łukasz Szczurek	Poland	2 (0+1+1+0)	56:02.6	+7:32.7
73	117	Sergey Naumik	Kazakhstan	3 (0+2+1+0)	56:04.8	+7:34.9
74	36	Tomas Kaukėnas	Lithuania	5 (1+0+2+2)	56:05.6	+7:35.7
75	109	Satoru Abe	Japan	4 (1+1+1+1)	56:10.6	+7:40.7
76	58	Dias Keneshev	Kazakhstan	4 (0+2+0+2)	56:11.0	+7:41.1
77	102	Kauri Koiv	Estonia	4 (2+1+0+1)	56:16.8	+7:46.9
78	13	Lowell Bailey	United States	6 (1+3+2+0)	56:17.3	+7:47.4
79	17	Jaroslav Soukup	Czech Republic	6 (3+1+1+1)	56:18.4	+7:48.5
80	87	Jay Hakkinen	United States	6 (1+1+2+2)	56:29.2	+7:59.3
81	94	Yan Savitskiy	Kazakhstan	4 (1+2+1+0)	56:46.9	+8:17.0
82	115	Miroslav Matiaško	Slovakia	5 (1+1+0+3)	57:24.0	+8:54.1
83	45	Markus Windisch	Italy	7 (2+1+2+2)	57:37.8	+9:07.9
84	54	Damir Rastić	Serbia	4 (0+0+1+3)	57:39.6	+9:09.7
85	80	Nathan Smith	Canada	6 (2+2+0+2)	57:45.4	+9:15.5
86	106	Vasja Rupnik	Slovenia	7 (1+2+2+2)	57:58.0	+9:28.1
87	33	Milanko Petrović	Serbia	7 (1+1+2+3)	58:11.2	+9:41.3
88	10	Jun Je-uk	South Korea	4 (0+2+2+0)	58:14.6	+9:44.7
89	59	Junji Nagai	Japan	8 (2+3+2+1)	58:25.6	+9:55.7
90	92	Marcel Laponder	Great Britain	6 (1+3+1+1)	58:38.6	+10:08.7
91	57	Pete Beyer	Great Britain	5 (0+3+1+1)	58:41.6	+10:11.7
92	41	Matej Kazár	Slovakia	8 (3+1+4+0)	58:56.7	+10:26.8
93	118	Danil Steptsenko	Estonia	7 (2+2+1+2)	59:38.5	+11:08.6
94	67	Li Zhonghai	China	7 (3+3+0+1)	59:39.2	+11:09.3
95	90	Lee Su-young	South Korea	5 (2+2+0+1)	59:40.0	+11:10.1
96	55	Remus Faur	Romania	3 (1+1+0+1)	59:41.5	+11:11.6
97	22	Károly Gombos	Hungary	5 (1+2+0+2)	59:50.3	+11:20.4
98	116	Rolands Pužulis	Latvia	3 (0+1+1+1)	59:54.2	+11:24.3
99	96	Kazuya Inomata	Japan	9 (4+2+1+2)	59:59.4	+11:29.5
100	9	Ahmet Üstüntaş	Turkey	4 (0+2+0+2)	1:00:10.9	+11:41.0
101	46	Karolis Zlatkauskas	Lithuania	8 (0+2+1+5)	1:00:30.7	+12:00.8
102	31	Zvonimir Tadejević	Croatia	3 (1+1+0+1)	1:00:35.3	+12:05.4
103	68	Lee Jung-sik	South Korea	6 (2+1+1+2)	1:00:37.5	+12:07.6
104	110	Carl Gibson	Great Britain	6 (0+2+0+4)	1:00:48.9	+12:19.0
105	32	Gjorgji Icoski	Macedonia	4 (0+2+0+2)	1:00:55.1	+12:25.2
106	121	Thomas Frei	Switzerland	8 (1+3+2+2)	1:01:03.8	+12:33.9
107	15	Nemanja Košarac	Bosnia and Herzegovina	7 (0+4+2+1)	1:02:07.3	+13:37.4
108	35	Øystein Slettemark	Greenland	8 (2+1+1+4)	1:02:09.6	+13:39.7
109	88	Aleksandr Lavrinovič	Lithuania	5 (3+1+1+0)	1:02:17.1	+13:47.2
110	101	Edin Hodžić	Serbia	7 (2+3+2+0)	1:02:31.7	+14:01.8
111	104	Kristian Kristoffersen	Greenland	7 (3+1+1+2)	1:02:40.6	+14:10.7
112	69	István Muskatal	Hungary	5 (0+2+1+2)	1:02:53.7	+14:23.8
113	40	Victor Pînzaru	Moldova	5 (2+1+1+1)	1:03:37.2	+15:07.3
114	112	Lee Kwang-ro	South Korea	8 (2+3+1+2)	1:04:00.3	+15:30.4
115	65	Aqqaluartaa Olsen	Greenland	11 (3+3+2+3)	1:04:17.3	+15:47.4
116	66	Darko Damjanovski	Macedonia	11 (1+4+4+2)	1:04:36.0	+16:06.1
117	60	Dino Butković	Croatia	5 (0+1+1+3)	1:05:28.0	+16:58.1
118	61	Stefan Lopatić	Bosnia and Herzegovina	10 (1+2+4+3)	1:05:55.8	+17:25.9
119	122	Nikola Jeremić	Serbia	9 (3+0+3+3)	1:07:34.9	+19:05.0
120	77	Recep Efe	Turkey	11 (5+1+2+3)	1:09:43.2	+21:13.3
121	81	Tomislav Crnković	Croatia	11 (4+1+2+4)	1:13:30.5	+25:00.6
	52	Alexis Bœuf	France	(1+1+2)	Did not finish	
	107	Sami Orpana	Finland	(0+3)	Did not finish	
