= Biathlon World Championships 2015 – Men's pursuit =

Men's pursuit at the Biathlon World Championships 2015
- Venue: Kontiolahti, Finland
- Date: 8 March 2015
- Competitors: 60 from 23 nations
- Winning time: 30:47.9

Medalists
gold medal	Erik Lesser	Germany
silver medal	Anton Shipulin	Russia
bronze medal	Tarjei Bø	Norway

The Men's pursuit event of the Biathlon World Championships 2015 was held on 8 March 2015. The fastest 60 athletes of the sprint competition participated over a course of 12.5 km.

== Results ==
The race was started at 14:15 EET.

Rank	Bib	Name	Nationality	Start	Penalties (P+P+S+S)	Time	Deficit
1st place, gold medalist(s)	5	Erik Lesser	Germany	0:30	0 (0+0+0+0)	30:47.9	
2nd place, silver medalist(s)	18	Anton Shipulin	Russia	1:03	1 (0+1+0+0)	31:04.9	+17.0
3rd place, bronze medalist(s)	3	Tarjei Bø	Norway	0:25	1 (0+0+1+0)	31:06.6	+18.7
4	7	Michal Šlesingr	Czech Republic	0:36	1 (1+0+0+0)	31:08.3	+20.4
5	19	Ole Einar Bjørndalen	Norway	1:09	2 (0+0+1+1)	31:31.8	+43.9
6	8	Vladimir Iliev	Bulgaria	0:40	2 (0+0+1+1)	31:33.8	+45.9
7	12	Martin Fourcade	France	0:50	3 (0+1+1+1)	31:49.9	+1:02.0
8	14	Jakov Fak	Slovenia	0:55	3 (1+2+0+0)	31:52.4	+1:04.5
9	9	Ondřej Moravec	Czech Republic	0:44	2 (0+1+1+0)	31:54.6	+1:06.7
10	4	Simon Fourcade	France	0:30	3 (0+0+1+2)	31:56.5	+1:08.6
11	26	Serhiy Semenov	Ukraine	1:25	1 (0+1+0+0)	32:00.3	+1:12.4
12	46	Simon Eder	Austria	1:58	1 (1+0+0+0)	32:04.8	+1:16.9
13	2	Nathan Smith	Canada	0:12	5 (2+1+1+1)	32:15.6	+1:27.7
14	30	Arnd Peiffer	Germany	1:31	3 (1+1+0+1)	32:20.3	+1:32.4
15	39	Dominik Landertinger	Austria	1:47	2 (0+0+1+1)	32:23.8	+1:35.9
16	21	Brendan Green	Canada	1:14	1 (0+0+0+1)	32:24.9	+1:37.0
17	16	Yuryi Liadov	Belarus	1:00	3 (0+2+0+1)	32:25.6	+1:37.7
18	11	Jaroslav Soukup	Czech Republic	0:50	3 (0+1+2+0)	32:29.8	+1:41.9
19	36	Emil Hegle Svendsen	Norway	1:41	3 (0+2+0+1)	32:32.8	+1:44.9
20	15	Tim Burke	United States	1:00	4 (0+0+2+2)	32:36.0	+1:48.1
21	25	Christian De Lorenzi	Italy	1:21	3 (0+1+1+1)	32:37.7	+1:49.8
22	6	Evgeniy Garanichev	Russia	0:36	6 (2+2+1+1)	32:40.7	+1:52.9
23	22	Michael Rösch	Belgium	1:14	2 (0+0+0+2)	32:44.7	+1:56.8
24	20	Fredrik Lindström	Sweden	1:13	3 (0+1+1+1)	32:44.7	+1:56.8
25	42	Andrejs Rastorgujevs	Latvia	1:48	4 (2+1+1+0)	33:02.2	+2:14.3
26	41	Daniel Mesotitsch	Austria	1:48	3 (2+1+0+0)	33:07.6	+2:19.7
27	31	Roland Lessing	Estonia	1:32	3 (1+2+0+0)	33:09.4	+2:21.5
28	10	Benedikt Doll	Germany	0:47	7 (1+1+2+3)	33:18.1	+2:30.2
29	35	Henrik L'Abée-Lund	Norway	1:38	3 (1+0+0+2)	33:31.5	+2:43.6
30	24	Lukas Hofer	Italy	1:19	6 (1+2+2+1)	33:32.1	+2:44.2
31	1	Johannes Thingnes Bø	Norway	0:00	8 (2+2+2+2)	33:32.2	+2:44.3
32	28	Mario Dolder	Switzerland	1:30	4 (0+1+2+1)	33:34.6	+2:46.7
33	13	Benjamin Weger	Switzerland	0:55	7 (0+2+4+1)	33:42.6	+2:54.7
34	32	Cornel Puchianu	Romania	1:33	5 (2+1+1+1)	33:45.5	+2:57.6
35	23	Dominik Windisch	Italy	1:16	6 (0+3+1+2)	33:48.6	+3:00.7
36	17	Lowell Bailey	United States	1:02	5 (0+0+4+1)	33:50.5	+3:02.6
37	44	Julian Eberhard	Austria	1:51	7 (0+1+4+2)	33:58.9	+3:11.0
38	43	Vladimir Chepelin	Belarus	1:49	5 (0+2+2+1)	33:59.4	+3:11.5
39	47	Klemen Bauer	Slovenia	2:01	5 (0+2+0+3)	34:00.8	+3:12.9
40	27	Timofey Lapshin	Russia	1:28	7 (2+2+1+7)	34:11.5	+3:23.6
41	40	Jean-Guillaume Béatrix	France	1:47	4 (0+0+1+3)	34:29.0	+3:41.1
42	33	Matej Kazár	Slovakia	1:36	7 (0+1+5+1)	34:32.4	+3:44.5
43	49	Dmytro Pidruchnyi	Ukraine	2:06	3 (0+1+1+1)	34:35.2	+3:47.3
44	48	Oleksander Zhyrnyi	Ukraine	2:04	4 (2+1+0+1)	34:41.6	+3:53.7
45	55	Sean Doherty	United States	2:29	3 (1+1+0+1)	34:43.8	+3:55.9
46	38	Quentin Fillon Maillet	France	1:41	7 (1+1+4+1)	34:55.5	+4:07.6
47	34	Dmitry Malyshko	Russia	1:36	7 (1+3+1+2)	35:06.7	+4:18.8
48	56	Dmitriy Dyuzhev	Belarus	2:38	5 (1+0+2+2)	35:08.2	+4:20.3
49	52	Krasimir Anev	Bulgaria	2:18	5 (3+2+0+0)	35:10.4	+4:22.5
50	29	Serafin Wiestner	Switzerland	1:30	7 (2+0+3+2)	35:12.0	+4:24.1
51	45	Leif Nordgren	United States	1:57	6 (2+2+0+2)	35:14.1	+4:26.2
52	50	Scott Gow	Canada	2:06	5 (1+2+2+0)	35:21.6	+4:33.7
53	53	Kauri Kõiv	Estonia	2:20	5 (0+1+1+3)	35:24.1	+4:36.2
54	54	Ahti Toivanen	Finland	2:23	4 (2+1+0+1)	35:33.3	+4:45.4
55	37	Ivan Joller	Switzerland	1:41	4 (2+1+1+0)	35:38.8	+4:50.9
56	60	Tomas Kaukėnas	Lithuania	2:48	5 (1+1+1+2)	36:24.2	+5:36.3
57	59	Michal Krčmář	Czech Republic	2:47	6 (3+0+1+2)	37:05.5	+6:17.6
58	51	Jarkko Kauppinen	Finland	2:08	8 (1+3+1+3)	37:36.1	+6:48.2
59	57	Ivan Zlatev	Bulgaria	2:45	7 (3+2+1+1)	38:05.4	+7:17.5
60	58	Krzysztof Pływaczyk	Poland	2:45	8 (4+2+1+1)	38:30.5	+7:42.6
