= Biathlon World Championships 2011 – Men's mass start =

Men's mass start at the Biathlon World Championships 2011
- Location: Khanty-Mansiysk, Russia
- Date: 12 March
- Competitors: 30 from 12 nations
- Winning time: 38:42.7

Medalists
gold medal	Emil Hegle Svendsen	Norway
silver medal	Lukas Hofer	Italy
bronze medal	Tarjei Bø	Norway

The men's mass start competition of the Biathlon World Championships 2011 was held on March 12, 2011 at 14:30 local time.

== Results ==
Rank	Bib	Name	Country	Penalties (P+P+S+S)	Time	Deficit
1st place, gold medalist(s)	4	Emil Hegle Svendsen	Norway	1 (0+0+0+1)	38:42.7	0.0
2nd place, silver medalist(s)	10	Lukas Hofer	Italy	1 (0+0+0+1)	38:57.0	+14.3
3rd place, bronze medalist(s)	3	Tarjei Bø	Norway	2 (0+0+0+2)	39:06.0	+23.3
4	8	Ivan Cherezov	Russia	1 (0+0+1+0)	39:06.9	+24.2
5	12	Ole Einar Bjørndalen	Norway	1 (1+0+0+0)	39:11.5	+28.8
6	20	Andrei Makoveev	Russia	0 (0+0+0+0)	39:32.5	+49.8
7	1	Arnd Peiffer	Germany	3 (2+0+0+1)	39:36.4	+53.7
8	13	Simon Eder	Austria	2 (1+0+0+1)	39:36.9	+54.2
9	2	Martin Fourcade	France	3 (0+0+1+2)	39:37.5	+54.8
10	26	Fredrik Lindström	Sweden	1 (1+0+0+0)	39:38.9	+56.2
11	6	Christoph Sumann	Austria	3 (0+0+1+2)	39:58.3	+1:15.6
12	17	Andriy Deryzemlya	Ukraine	2 (0+1+0+1)	40:00.4	+1:17.7
13	25	Lars Berger	Norway	4 (0+0+2+2)	40:05.8	+1:23.1
14	19	Simon Fourcade	France	2 (0+1+1+0)	40:06.6	+1:23.9
15	14	Andreas Birnbacher	Germany	3 (1+0+1+1)	40:08.5	+1:25.8
16	28	Leif Nordgren	United States	3 (1+0+1+1)	40:26.7	+1:44.0
17	5	Maxim Maksimov	Russia	3 (1+0+1+1)	40:39.7	+1:57.0
18	29	Klemen Bauer	Slovenia	4 (1+0+2+1)	40:49.0	+2:06.3
19	7	Michael Greis	Germany	4 (0+2+1+1)	40:57.1	+2:14.4
20	23	Edgars Piksons	Latvia	3 (1+1+0+1)	41:08.9	+2:26.2
21	22	Serhiy Semenov	Ukraine	3 (0+1+1+1)	41:15.6	+2:32.9
22	27	Christian de Lorenzi	Italy	5 (1+0+2+2)	41:19.9	+2:37.2
23	21	Christoph Stephan	Germany	4 (1+1+1+1)	41:43.8	+3:01.1
24	16	Serguei Sednev	Ukraine	2 (1+0+1+0)	42:02.5	+3:19.8
25	9	Michal Šlesingr	Czech Republic	6 (3+2+1+0)	42:04.4	+3:21.7
26	15	Björn Ferry	Sweden	6 (1+2+1+2)	42:23.3	+3:40.6
27	24	Markus Windisch	Italy	5 (3+1+0+1)	42:32.0	+3:49.3
28	11	Carl Johan Bergman	Sweden	7 (0+3+2+2)	42:53.0	+4:10.3
29	30	Maxim Chudov	Russia	8 (4+3+0+1)	44:59.9	+6:17.2
DSQ	18	Evgeny Ustyugov	Russia	0 (0+0+0+0)	38:47.7	+5.0
