= Martin Bogdanov =

Bulgarian biathlete (born 1986)

Personal information
- Born: 14 February 1986 (age 40) Sofia, Bulgaria

Sport
- Sport: Skiing
- Updated on 28 February 2013

Martin Bogdanov (Bulgarian: Мартин Богданов) (born in Sofia on 14 February 1986) is a retired Bulgarian biathlete.

Bogdanov competed in the 2010 Winter Olympics for Bulgaria. His lone race was the individual, where he finished 84th.

As of February 2013, his best performance at the Biathlon World Championships is 11th, as part of the 2009 men's relay team. His best individual performance is 69th, in the 2011 individual.

As of February 2013, his best Biathlon World Cup finish is 11th, as part of the Bulgarian men's relay team at Oberhof in 2009/10. His best individual finish is 51st, in the individual at Antholz in 2011/12.

Martin Bogdanov retired from the sport after the 2012/13 season.
