= Tarjei Bø =

Norwegian biathlete (born 1988)

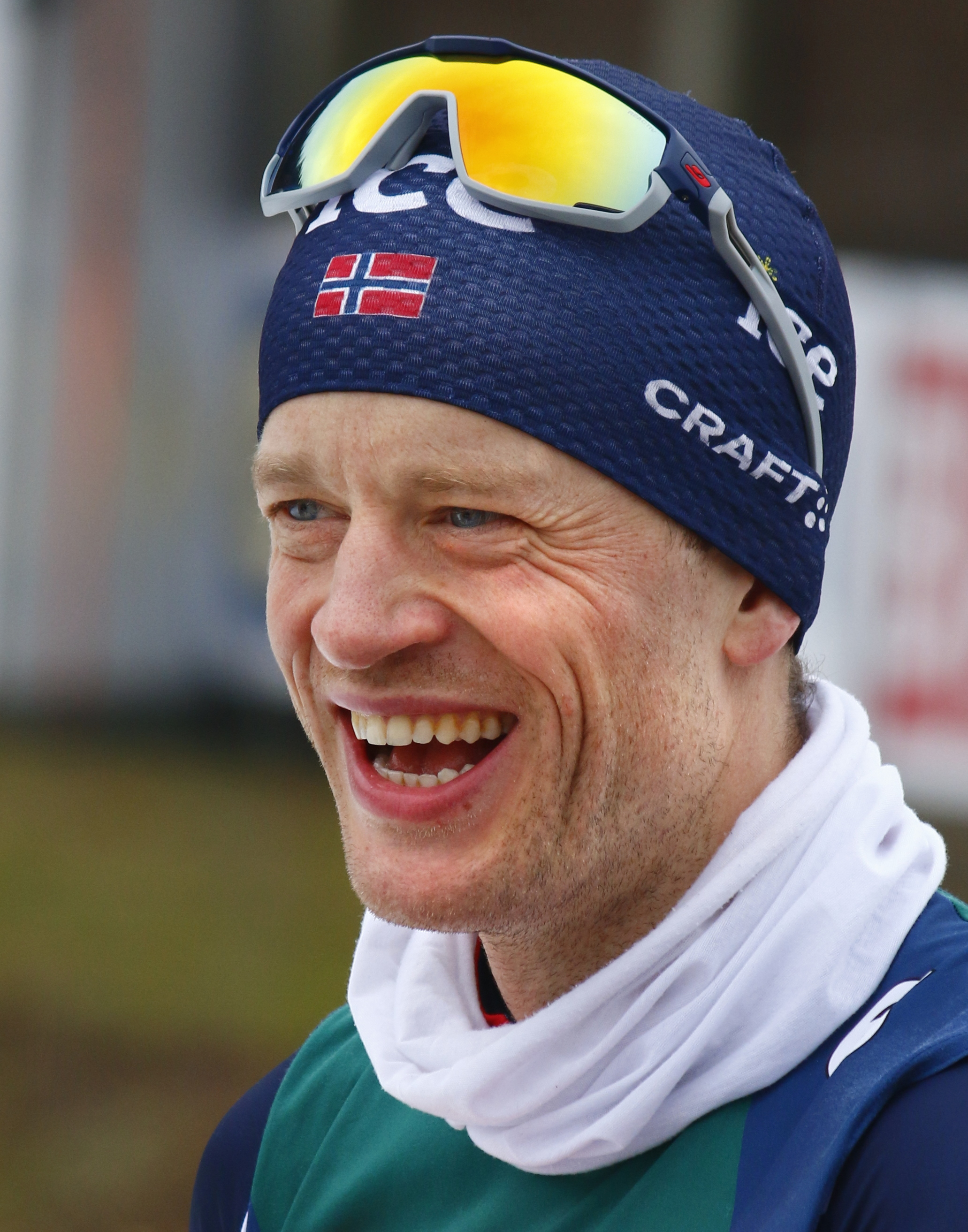
- Bø in 2024

Personal information
- Nationality: Norwegian
- Born: 29 July 1988 (age 37) Stryn, Norway
- Height: 1.85 m (6 ft 1 in)
- Weight: 76 kg (168 lb)
- Relative: Johannes Thingnes Bø

Sport

Professional information
- Sport: Biathlon
- Club: Markane IL
- World Cup debut: 26 March 2009

Olympic Games
- Teams: 4 (2010, 2014, 2018, 2022)
- Medals: 7 (3 gold)

World Championships
- Teams: 12 (2011–2025)
- Medals: 28 (12 gold)

World Cup
- Seasons: 17 (2009–2025)
- Individual races: 326
- All races: 408
- Individual victories: 15
- All victories: 59
- Individual podiums: 72
- All podiums: 147
- Overall titles: 1 (2010–11)
- Discipline titles: 5: 2 Sprint (2010–11, 2023–24); 1 Pursuit (2010–11); 1 Mass Start (2020–21); 1 Individual (2021–22)
Medal record
Men's biathlon
Representing Norway
| Event | 1st | 2nd | 3rd |
|---|---|---|---|
| Olympic Games | 3 | 2 | 2 |
| World Championships | 12 | 7 | 9 |
| Total | 15 | 9 | 11 |
Olympic Games
| Gold medal – first place | 2010 Vancouver | 4 × 7.5 km relay |
| Gold medal – first place | 2022 Beijing | 4 × 7.5 km relay |
| Gold medal – first place | 2022 Beijing | Mixed relay |
| Silver medal – second place | 2018 Pyeongchang | 4 × 7.5 km relay |
| Silver medal – second place | 2022 Beijing | 12.5 km pursuit |
| Bronze medal – third place | 2014 Sochi | 4 × 7.5 km relay |
| Bronze medal – third place | 2022 Beijing | 10 km sprint |
World Championships
| Gold medal – first place | 2011 Khanty-Mansiysk | 20 km individual |
| Gold medal – first place | 2011 Khanty-Mansiysk | 4 × 7.5 km relay |
| Gold medal – first place | 2011 Khanty-Mansiysk | Mixed relay |
| Gold medal – first place | 2012 Ruhpolding | 4 × 7.5 km relay |
| Gold medal – first place | 2013 Nové Město | 15 km mass start |
| Gold medal – first place | 2013 Nové Město | 4 × 7.5 km relay |
| Gold medal – first place | 2013 Nové Město | Mixed relay |
| Gold medal – first place | 2016 Oslo | 4 × 7.5 km relay |
| Gold medal – first place | 2019 Östersund | 4 × 7.5 km relay |
| Gold medal – first place | 2020 Antholz | Mixed relay |
| Gold medal – first place | 2021 Pokljuka | 4 × 7.5 km relay |
| Gold medal – first place | 2025 Lenzerheide | 4 × 7.5 km relay |
| Silver medal – second place | 2015 Kontiolahti | 4 × 7.5 km relay |
| Silver medal – second place | 2020 Antholz | 4 × 7.5 km relay |
| Silver medal – second place | 2023 Oberhof | 10 km sprint |
| Silver medal – second place | 2023 Oberhof | 4 × 7.5 km relay |
| Silver medal – second place | 2024 Nové Město | 20 km individual |
| Silver medal – second place | 2024 Nové Město | 4 × 7.5 km relay |
| Silver medal – second place | 2024 Nové Město | Mixed relay |
| Bronze medal – third place | 2011 Khanty-Mansiysk | 10 km sprint |
| Bronze medal – third place | 2011 Khanty-Mansiysk | 12.5 km pursuit |
| Bronze medal – third place | 2011 Khanty-Mansiysk | 15 km mass start |
| Bronze medal – third place | 2015 Kontiolahti | 10 km sprint |
| Bronze medal – third place | 2015 Kontiolahti | 12.5 km pursuit |
| Bronze medal – third place | 2015 Kontiolahti | 15 km mass start |
| Bronze medal – third place | 2015 Kontiolahti | Mixed relay |
| Bronze medal – third place | 2016 Oslo | Mixed relay |
| Bronze medal – third place | 2019 Östersund | 20 km individual |
Junior World Championships
| Bronze medal – third place | 2009 Canmore | 10 km sprint |
| Bronze medal – third place | 2009 Canmore | 12.5 km pursuit |
Youth World Championships
| Gold medal – first place | 2006 Presque Isle | 12.5 km individual |
| Silver medal – second place | 2006 Presque Isle | 10 km pursuit |
| Silver medal – second place | 2007 Martell | 10 km pursuit |
| Silver medal – second place | 2007 Martell | 3 × 7.5 km relay |
European Championships
| Gold medal – first place | 2019 Raubichi | Sprint |
| Gold medal – first place | 2019 Raubichi | Pursuit |
| Silver medal – second place | 2019 Raubichi | Individual |
- Updated on 23 March 2025

Tarjei Bø (born 29 July 1988) is a former Norwegian professional biathlete. Awarded Olympic gold medals, World Championship gold medals and World Cup victories from 2010 to 2025. Bø debuted in the Biathlon World Cup on 26 March 2009 in Khanty-Mansiysk, Russia. In the 2010 Winter Olympics, he earned his first gold medal in the 4 × 7.5 km biathlon relay. On 10 December 2010 he won the World Cup sprint race in Hochfilzen, his first world cup victory. He also won the following pursuit race and anchored the winning relay team. Bø is the older brother of biathlete Johannes Thingnes Bø.

Tarjei won the 2010 to 2011 biathlon crystal globe for having the most points overall in the season. He finished five points ahead of his teammate Emil Hegle Svendsen.

== Career ==
=== Early career ===
At his first Junior World Championships in 2006 in Presque Isle, Maine, United States, Bø claimed the gold medal in the individual discipline and the silver medal in the pursuit discipline. A year later in Martell-Val Martello, Italy, Bø again claimed the silver medal in the pursuit discipline and was part of the Norwegian relay team that won the silver medal. The 2009 Junior World Championships in Canmore, Canada began in disappointment: Bø finished as number 23 in the individual discipline with a total of five shooting errors. However, Bø would eventually claim the bronze medal in both the pursuit and sprint disciplines. During the 2009 European Championships in Ufa, Russia, Bø was the most successful biathlete and claimed the gold medal in all four races he entered (individual, sprint, pursuit and relay). At the World Cup finals in Khanty Mansiysk, Russia, Bø made his debut in the Biathlon World Cup on 26 March 2009, finishing 61st.

=== 2009–10 season: Olympic champion ===
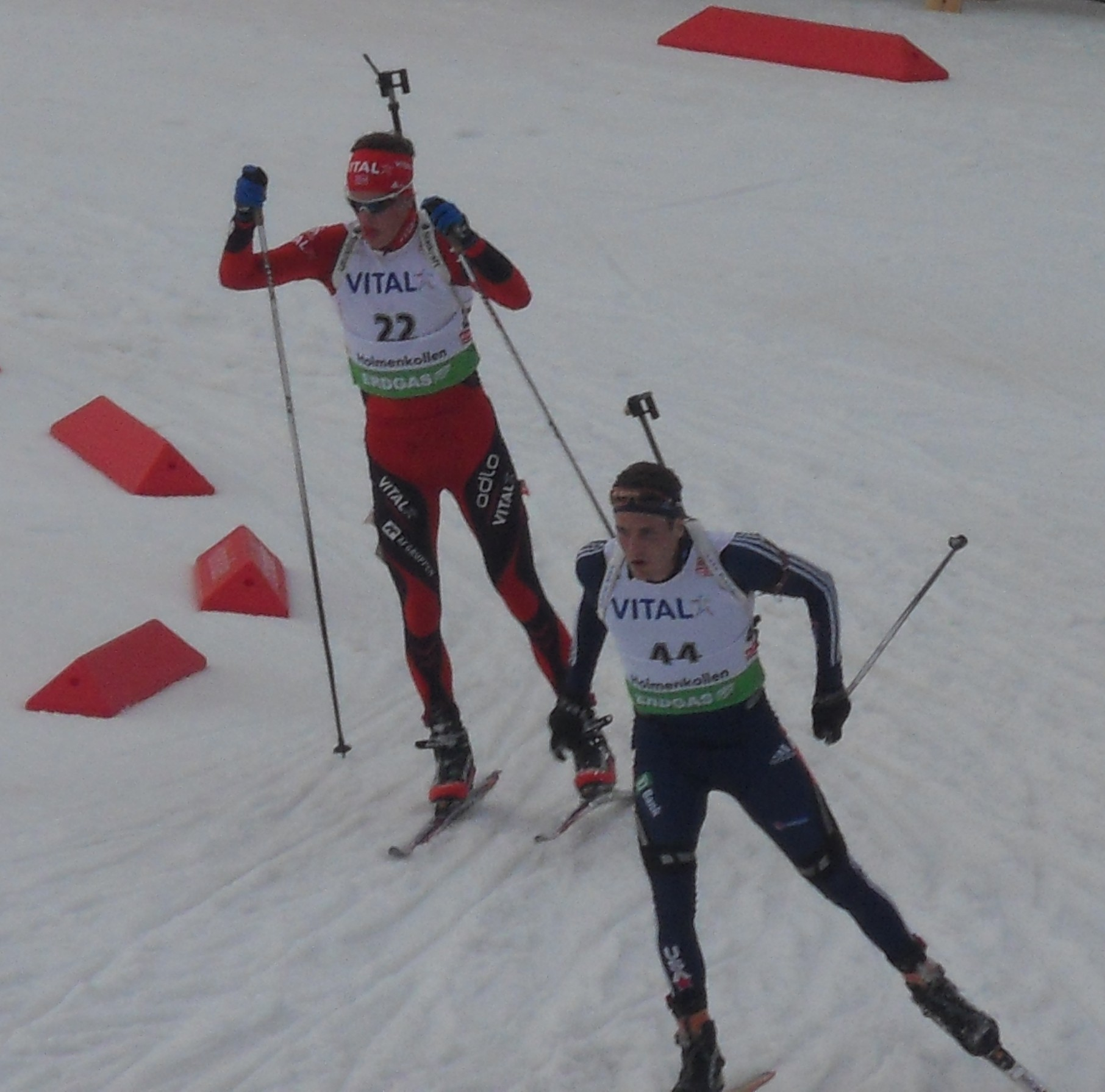
Bø a month after the Olympics in Oslo (bib 22)

In the 2009–10 season, Bø continued his positive development in the IBU Cup, coming in sixth in the individual discipline and second in the sprint. This led to his appointment to the World Cup races in Pokljuka, Oberhof and Ruhpolding. In Pokljuka, Bø made an impressive performance and finished fourth; in Oberhof, he was part of the Norwegian winning relay team; and in Ruhpolding, he was part of the Norwegian relay team that finished second. On 29 January, Bø was named as one of the 99 athletes that would travel to the 2010 Winter Olympics in Vancouver, Canada. On 18 February, Bø finished 21st in his first Olympics event. Bø was chosen for the Norwegian relay team, which claimed the gold medal before runners-up Austria and bronze-medalists Russia. At the World Cup stop in Kontiolahti, Finland, Bø ran the last leg for the Norwegian mixed team, securing the win for Norway.

=== 2010–11 season: Overall World Cup winner ===
2010–11 World Cup season results
| No. | World Cup location | Individual | Sprint | Pursuit | Mass Start | Relay | Mixed relay |
| 1 | Östersund, Sweden | 4 | 5 | 4 | – | – | – |
| 2 | Hochfilzen, Austria | – | 1 | 1 | – | 1 | – |
| 3 | Pokljuka, Slovenia | 12 | 2 | – | – | – | DNS |
| 4 | Oberhof, Germany | – | 1 | – | 1 | DNS | – |
| 5 | Ruhpolding, Germany | 5 | 5 | 4 | – | – | – |
| 6 | Antholz-Anterselva, Italy | – | 51 | – | 15 | 3 | – |
| 7 | Presque Isle, USA | – | 4 | 6 | – | – | DNS |
| 8 | Fort Kent, USA | – | 3 | 3 | 3 | – | – |
| WCH | Khanty-Mansiysk, Russia | 1 | 3 | 3 | 4 | 1 | 1 |
| 9 | Oslo, Norway | – | 44 | 2 | 8 | – | – |
Key:"—" denotes discipline not held; DNS: Did not start; WCH: World Championships

Bø became a regular fixture in the Norwegian team in the 2010–11 season. He started the season with fourth place in the individual discipline in Östersund, Sweden, followed by fifth and fourth place in the sprint and pursuit disciplines, respectively. On 5 January 2007, Bø won his first World Cup event, the sprint race in Hochfilzen, Austria, beating runner-up Serguei Sednev by 27.5 seconds. One day later, he won his second World Cup victory in the pursuit discipline. On 12 December, he was part of the winning Norwegian relay team. After his highly successful races in Hochfilzen, Bø took the yellow bib of the Overall World Cup leader. In the races in Pokljuka, Bø finished 12th in the individual discipline and second in the sprint. In Oberhof, Bø claimed his third and fourth World Cup victories (mass start and sprint). At the World Cup stops in February in the United States, Bø continued his good form; his worst result was sixth place. He came in fourth in the sprint discipline in Presque Isle, Maine. One week later in Fort Kent, Maine, Bø finished all three races in third place (sprint, pursuit and mass start).

On 3 March, Bø won his first World Championship title as part of the Norwegian mixed team. Running the last lap, Bø secured Norway the victory; this was the first time Norway had won this event. Two days later, Bø came in third in the sprint discipline, behind runner-up Martin Fourcade and Arnd Peiffer. By finishing third, Bø won the Overall Sprint Cup. In the pursuit discipline, Bø again claimed the bronze medal. On 8 March, Bø won his first individual gold medal in the individual, beating runner-up Maxim Maksimov by 40 seconds despite having one shooting error compared to Maksimov's clean shooting. Two days later, Bø claimed his second title alongside Ole Einar Bjørndalen, Alexander Os and Emil Hegle Svendsen in the relay, becoming the most successful biathlete at the championships with a total of five medals.

At the season finals in Oslo, Norway Bø, with five shooting errors, came in 44th in the sprint, his second-worst result this season. In the pursuit two days later, Bø started 2 minutes and 15 seconds behind; however, he pulled back the entire time and eventually finished second, 0.6 seconds behind teammate Emil Hegle Svendsen, thus winning the Overall Pursuit Cup. Bø had a narrow lead of 31 points to Svendsen in the Overall World Cup before the season's last race, mass start. Svendsen won the event, but as Bø finished eight, he beat Svendsen in the Overall Cup by five points, winning the Overall Cup for the first time in his career.

=== 2011–12 season ===
Bø poorly started the season and finished 25th in the individual in Östersund. He was back on the podium in two of the three next events, however; he finished second in the sprint in Östersund and came in second in the pursuit in Hochfilzen. He was also part of the winning Norwegian relay team in Hochfilzen, running the last lap.

In March 2025, Tarjei Bø and his brother Johannes Thingnes Bø retired from competitions.

== Biathlon results ==
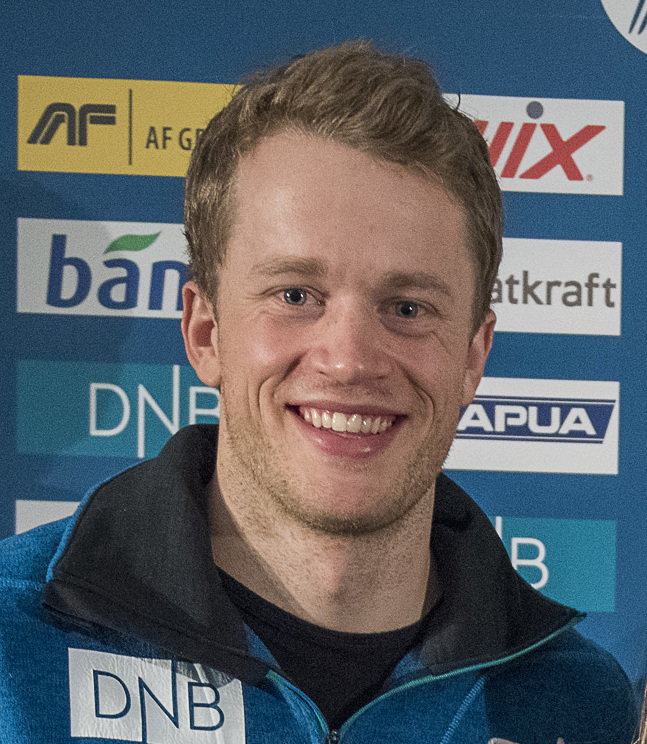
Bø in 2015

All results are sourced from the International Biathlon Union.

=== Olympic Games ===
7 medals – (3 gold, 2 silver, 2 bronze)

| Event | Individual | Sprint | Pursuit | Mass start | Relay | Mixed relay^{[a]} |
|---|---|---|---|---|---|---|
| (Canada) 2010 Vancouver | 21st | — | — | — | Gold | —N/a |
| (Russia) 2014 Sochi | 26th | 39th | 27th | — | Bronze | — |
| (South Korea) 2018 Pyeongchang | 13th | 13th | 4th | 8th | Silver | — |
| (China) 2022 Beijing | 8th | Bronze | Silver | 12th | Gold | Gold |

*The mixed relay was added as an event in 2014.

=== World Championships ===
28 medals – (12 gold, 7 silver, 9 bronze)

| Event | Individual | Sprint | Pursuit | Mass start | Relay | Mixed relay | Single mixed relay |
|---|---|---|---|---|---|---|---|
| (Russia) 2011 Khanty-Mansiysk | Gold | Bronze | Bronze | Bronze | Gold | Gold | —N/a |
| (Germany) 2012 Ruhpolding | 18th | 17th | 7th | 17th | Gold | — | —N/a |
| (Czech Republic) 2013 Nové Město | 12th | 18th | 17th | Gold | Gold | Gold | —N/a |
| (Finland) 2015 Kontiolahti | 25th | Bronze | Bronze | Bronze | Silver | Bronze | —N/a |
| (Norway) 2016 Oslo | 22nd | 54th | 31st | 6th | Gold | Bronze | —N/a |
| (Austria) 2017 Hochfilzen | — | 14th | 9th | 14th | 8th | — | —N/a |
| (Sweden) 2019 Östersund | Bronze | 13th | 4th | 9th | Gold | — | — |
| (Italy) 2020 Antholz-Anterselva | 6th | 4th | 6th | 4th | Silver | Gold | — |
| (Slovenia) 2021 Pokljuka | 69th | 9th | 13th | 6th | Gold | — | — |
| (Germany) 2023 Oberhof | 7th | Silver | 4th | 9th | Silver | — | — |
| (Czech Republic) 2024 Nové Město | Silver | 6th | 5th | 4th | Silver | Silver | — |
| (Switzerland) 2025 Lenzerheide | 10th | 10th | 10th | 18th | Gold | — | — |

*During Olympic seasons competitions are only held for those events not included in the Olympic program.
**The single mixed relay was added as an event in 2019.

=== Junior/Youth World Championships ===
- 6 medals – (1 gold, 3 silver, 2 bronze)

| Event | Individual | Sprint | Pursuit | Relay |
|---|---|---|---|---|
| (United States) 2006 Presque Isle | Gold | 4th | Silver | 4th |
| (Italy) 2007 Martell-Val Martello | 4th | 5th | Silver | Silver |
| (Canada) 2009 Canmore | 23rd | Bronze | Bronze | 6th |

=== World Cup standings ===
- 6 titles – (1 Overall, 1 Individual, 2 Sprint, 1 Pursuit, 1 Mass Start)

| Season | Discipline |
|---|---|
| 2010–11 | Overall |
| 2010–11 | Sprint |
| 2010–11 | Pursuit |
| 2020–21 | Mass Start |
| 2021–22 | Individual |
| 2023–24 | Sprint |

| Season | Overall | | | Individual | | | Sprint | | | Pursuit | | | Mass start | | |
| Season | Races | Points^{[a]} | Position | Races | Points^{[b]} | Position | Races | Points^{[b]} | Position | Races | Points^{[b]} | Position | Races | Points^{[b]} | Position |
|---|---|---|---|---|---|---|---|---|---|---|---|---|---|---|---|
| 2008–09 | 1/26 | 0 | —N/a | 0/4 | 0 | —N/a | 1/10 | 0 | —N/a | 0/7 | 0 | —N/a | 0/5 | 0 | —N/a |
| 2009–10 | 11/25 | 176 | 43rd | 2/4 | 24 | 50th | 6/10 | 108 | 29th | 2/6 | 33 | 53rd | 1/5 | 11 | 41st |
| 2010–11 | 26/26 | 1110 | 1st | 4/4 | 172 | 2nd | 10/10 | 393 | 1st | 7/7 | 334 | 1st | 5/5 | 211 | 3rd |
| 2011–12 | 23/26 | 680 | 7th | 3/3 | 67 | 14th | 9/10 | 249 | 6th | 7/8 | 257 | 4th | 4/5 | 107 | 20th |
| 2012–13 | 16/26 | 518 | 15th | 2/3 | 55 | 14th | 6/10 | 179 | 15th | 4/8 | 125 | 25th | 4/5 | 159 | 6th |
| 2013–14 | 11/22 | 266 | 28th | 2/2 | 10 | 47th | 4/9 | 76 | 39th | 4/8 | 132 | 21st | 1/3 | 48 | 24th |
| 2014–15 | 19/25 | 493 | 19th | 2/3 | 28 | 36th | 7/10 | 148 | 25th | 7/7 | 183 | 7th | 3/5 | 134 | 10th |
| 2015–16 | 23/25 | 708 | 6th | 3/3 | 68 | 14th | 8/9 | 234 | 6th | 8/8 | 267 | 4th | 4/5 | 139 | 8th |
| 2016–17 | 8/26 | 219 | 36th | 0/3 | 0 | —N/a | 3/9 | 74 | 42nd | 3/9 | 89 | 37th | 2/5 | 56 | 30th |
| 2017–18 | 21/22 | 591 | 7th | 1/2 | 21 | 35th | 8/8 | 194 | 10th | 7/7 | 193 | 8th | 5/5 | 183 | 4th |
| 2018–19 | 22/25 | 724 | 6th | 2/3 | 54 | 17th | 8/9 | 271 | 6th | 7/8 | 266 | 5th | 5/5 | 133 | 11th |
| 2019–20 | 21/21 | 740 | 4th | 3/3 | 114 | 4th | 8/8 | 307 | 4th | 5/5 | 178 | 6th | 5/5 | 166 | 8th |
| 2020–21 | 26/26 | 893 | 4th | 3/3 | 55 | 14th | 10/10 | 318 | 3rd | 8/8 | 249 | 6th | 5/5 | 184 | 1st |
| 2021–22 | 18/22 | 601 | 6th | 2/2 | 108 | 1st | 7/9 | 224 | 8th | 5/7 | 163 | 10th | 4/4 | 106 | 10th |
| 2022–23 | 19/21 | 684 | 6th | 2/3 | 31 | 32th | 7/7 | 250 | 6th | 7/7 | 277 | 4th | 3/4 | 126 | 7th |
| 2023–24 | 21/21 | 1080 | 2nd | 3/3 | 165 | 2nd | 7/7 | 384 | 1st | 7/7 | 350 | 3rd | 4/4 | 181 | 4th |
| 2024–25 | 17/21 | 679 | 8th | 3/3 | 69 | 17th | 5/7 | 192 | 12th | 4/6 | 209 | 8th | 5/5 | 209 | 5th |

- Standings through 23 March 2025

a. ^{1} Until 2009–10 season, IBU did not count an athlete's three worst races in overall World Cup scores. In 2010–11 season, all races were included in World Cup scores. Starting from 2011–12 season, the two worst results have been eliminated again. So the points in the "Points" column is represented after deduction, except 2010–11 season.
b. ^{1} ^{2} ^{3} ^{4} Until 2009–10 season it was required to leave out the result of the worst discipline race for the final result of discipline world cup (if there were four discipline races or more during the season), so the points in the "Points" columns for those seasons is represented after deduction of the result of the worst discipline race.

=== Individual victories ===
- 15 victories – (8 Sp, 2 Pu, 4 MS, 1 Ind)

| No. | Season | Date | Location | Discipline | Level |
|---|---|---|---|---|---|
| 1 | 2010/11 | 10 December 2010 | Hochfilzen, Austria | 10 km Sprint | World Cup |
| 2 | 2010/11 | 11 December 2010 | Hochfilzen, Austria | 12.5 km Pursuit | World Cup |
| 3 | 2010/11 | 7 January 2011 | Oberhof, Germany | 10 km Sprint | World Cup |
| 4 | 2010/11 | 9 January 2011 | Oberhof, Germany | 15 km Mass Start | World Cup |
| 5 | 2010/11 | 8 March 2011 | Khanty-Mansiysk, Russia | 20 km Individual | World Championships |
| 6 | 2011/12 | 15 December 2011 | Hochfilzen, Austria | 10 km Sprint | World Cup |
| 7 | 2012/13 | 17 February 2013 | Nové Město, Czech Republic | 15 km Mass Start | World Championships |
| 8 | 2012/13 | 28 February 2013 | Holmenkollen, Norway | 10 km Sprint | World Cup |
| 9 | 2017/18 | 2 December 2017 | Östersund, Sweden | 10 km Sprint | World Cup |
| 10 | 2020/21 | 3 December 2020 | Kontiolahti, Finland | 10 km Sprint | World Cup |
| 11 | 2020/21 | 17 January 2021 | Oberhof, Germany | 15 km Mass Start | World Cup |
| 12 | 2020/21 | 7 March 2021 | Nové Město, Czech Republic | 12.5 km Pursuit | World Cup |
| 13 | 2023/24 | 8 December 2023 | Hochfilzen, Austria | 10 km Sprint | World Cup |
| 14 | 2024/25 | 22 December 2024 | Le Grand Bornand, France | 15 km Mass Start | World Cup |
| 15 | 2024/25 | 24 January 2025 | Antholz-Anterselva, Italy | 10 km Sprint | World Cup |

* Results are from UIPMB and IBU races which include the Biathlon World Cup, Biathlon World Championships and the Winter Olympic Games.

=== Relay victories ===
- 44 victories – (34 RL, 10 MR)

| No. | Season | Date | Location | Discipline | Level | Squad |
|---|---|---|---|---|---|---|
| 1 | 2009/10 | 7 January 2010 | Oberhof, Germany | 4x7.5 km Relay | World Cup | (with Hanevold / Svendsen / Bjørndalen) |
| 2 | 2009/10 | 26 February 2010 | Vancouver, Canada | 4x7.5 km Relay | Winter Olympic Games | (with Hanevold / Svendsen / Bjørndalen) |
| 3 | 2009/10 | 12 March 2010 | Kontiolahti, Finland | Mixed 2x6+2x7.5 km Relay | World Cup | (with Flatland / Berger / Hanevold) |
| 4 | 2010/11 | 12 December 2010 | Hochfilzen, Austria | 4x7.5 km Relay | World Cup | (with Os / Svendsen / Bjørndalen) |
| 5 | 2010/11 | 3 March 2011 | Khanty-Mansiysk, Russia | Mixed 2x6+2x7.5 km Relay | World Championships | (with Berger / Flatland / Bjørndalen) |
| 6 | 2010/11 | 11 March 2011 | Khanty-Mansiysk, Russia | 4x7.5 km Relay | World Championships | (with Bjørndalen / Os / Svendsen) |
| 7 | 2011/12 | 11 December 2011 | Hochfilzen, Austria | 4x7.5 km Relay | World Cup | (with Brattsveen / Berger / Svendsen) |
| 8 | 2011/12 | 9 March 2012 | Ruhpolding, Germany | 4x7.5 km Relay | World Championships | (with Bjørndalen / Brattsveen / Svendsen) |
| 9 | 2012/13 | 7 February 2013 | Nové Město, Czech Republic | Mixed 2x6+2x7.5 km Relay | World Championships | (with Berger / Solemdal / Svendsen) |
| 10 | 2012/13 | 16 February 2013 | Nové Město, Czech Republic | 4x7.5 km Relay | World Championships | (with Bjørndalen / L'Abée-Lund / Svendsen) |
| 11 | 2013/14 | 7 December 2013 | Hochfilzen, Austria | 4x7.5 km Relay | World Cup | (with Christiansen / Bjørndalen / Svendsen) |
| 12 | 2014/15 | 22 January 2015 | Antholz-Anterselva, Italy | 4x7.5 km Relay | World Cup | (with Bjørndalen / Bø / Svendsen) |
| 13 | 2014/15 | 6 February 2015 | Nové Město, Czech Republic | Mixed 2x6+2x7.5 km Relay | World Cup | (with Horn / Eckhoff / Bø) |
| 14 | 2015/16 | 29 November 2015 | Östersund, Sweden | Mixed 2x6+2x7.5 km Relay | World Cup | (with Horn / Eckhoff / Bø) |
| 15 | 2015/16 | 15 January 2016 | Ruhpolding, Germany | 4x7.5 km Relay | World Cup | (with Bjørndalen / Bø / Svendsen) |
| 16 | 2015/16 | 13 February 2016 | (United States) Presque Isle, USA | 4x7.5 km Relay | World Cup | (with Birkeland / Bjøntegaard / Bø) |
| 17 | 2015/16 | 12 March 2016 | Oslo Holmenkollen, Norway | 4x7.5 km Relay | World Championships | (with Bjørndalen / Bø / Svendsen) |
| 18 | 2017/18 | 12 January 2018 | Ruhpolding, Germany | 4x7.5 km Relay | World Cup | (with Birkeland / Svendsen / Bø) |
| 19 | 2017/18 | 18 March 2018 | Oslo Holmenkollen, Norway | 4x7.5 km Relay | World Cup | (with Birkeland / L'Abée-Lund / Bø) |
| 20 | 2018/19 | 18 January 2019 | Ruhpolding, Germany | 4x7.5 km Relay | World Cup | (with Birkeland / Christiansen / Bø) |
| 21 | 2018/19 | 16 March 2019 | Östersund, Sweden | 4x7.5 km Relay | World Championships | (with Birkeland / Christiansen / Bø) |
| 22 | 2019/20 | 7 December 2019 | Östersund, Sweden | 4x7.5 km Relay | World Cup | (with Dale / Bjøntegaard / Bø) |
| 23 | 2019/20 | 15 December 2019 | Hochfilzen, Austria | 4x7.5 km Relay | World Cup | (with Dale / Bjøntegaard / Bø) |
| 24 | 2019/20 | 13 February 2020 | Antholz-Anterselva, Italy | Mixed 2x6+2x7.5 km Relay | World Championships | (with Røiseland / Eckhoff / Bø) |
| 25 | 2019/20 | 7 March 2020 | Nové Město, Czech Republic | 4x7.5 km Relay | World Cup | (with Christiansen / Dale / Bø) |
| 26 | 2020/21 | 6 December 2020 | Kontiolahti, Finland | 4x7.5 km Relay | World Cup | (with Lægreid / Christiansen / Bø) |
| 27 | 2020/21 | 20 February 2021 | Pokljuka, Slovenia | 4x7.5 km Relay | World Championships | (with Lægreid / Bø / Christiansen) |
| 28 | 2020/21 | 14 March 2021 | Nové Město, Czech Republic | Mixed 4x6 km Relay | World Cup | (with Eckhoff / Røiseland / Bø) |
| 29 | 2021/22 | 4 December 2021 | Östersund, Sweden | 4x7.5 km Relay | World Cup | (with Bakken / Bø / Christiansen) |
| 30 | 2021/22 | 12 December 2021 | Hochfilzen, Austria | 4x7.5 km Relay | World Cup | (with Lægreid / Bø / Christiansen) |
| 31 | 2021/22 | 8 January 2022 | Oberhof, Germany | Mixed 4x7.5 km Relay | World Cup | (with Bø / Tandrevold / Røiseland) |
| 32 | 2021/22 | 23 January 2022 | Antholz-Anterselva, Italy | 4x7.5 km Relay | World Cup | (with Lægreid / Bø / Christiansen) |
| 33 | 2021/22 | 5 February 2022 | Beijing, China | Mixed 4x6 km Relay | Winter Olympic Games | (with Røiseland / Eckhoff / Bø) |
| 34 | 2021/22 | 15 February 2022 | Beijing, China | 4x7.5 km Relay | Winter Olympic Games | (with Lægreid / Bø / Christiansen) |
| 35 | 2022/23 | 1 December 2022 | Kontiolahti, Finland | 4x7.5 km Relay | World Cup | (with Christiansen / Lægreid / Bø) |
| 36 | 2022/23 | 13 January 2023 | Ruhpolding, Germany | 4x7.5 km Relay | World Cup | (with Lægreid / Christiansen / Bø) |
| 37 | 2022/23 | 22 January 2023 | Antholz-Anterselva, Italy | 4x7.5 km Relay | World Cup | (with Lægreid / Bø / Christiansen) |
| 38 | 2023/24 | 30 November 2023 | Östersund, Sweden | 4x7.5 km Relay | World Cup | (with Strømsheim / Bø / Christiansen) |
| 39 | 2023/24 | 10 December 2023 | Hochfilzen, Austria | 4x7.5 km Relay | World Cup | (with Lægreid / Bø / Christiansen) |
| 40 | 2023/24 | 7 January 2024 | Oberhof, Germany | 4x7.5 km Relay | World Cup | (with Strømsheim / Lægreid / Bø |
| 41 | 2023/24 | 11 January 2024 | Ruhpolding, Germany | 4x7.5 km Relay | World Cup | (with Lægreid / Dale-Skjevdal / Christiansen) |
| 42 | 2023/24 | 20 January 2024 | Antholz-Anterselva, Italy | Mixed 4x6 km Relay | World Cup | (with Arnekleiv / Knotten) / Bø |
| 43 | 2023/24 | 8 March 2024 | (United States) Utah, USA | 4x7.5 km Relay | World Cup | (with Lægreid / Bø / Christiansen) |
| 44 | 2024/25 | 22 February 2025 | Lenzerheide, Switzerland | 4x7.5 km Relay | World Championships | (with Strømsheim / Lægreid / Bø) |

* Results are from UIPMB and IBU races which include the Biathlon World Cup, Biathlon World Championships and the Winter Olympic Games.

=== Overall record ===
| Result | Individual | Sprint | Pursuit | Mass Start | Relay | Mixed Relay^{[a]} | Total | | |
| Result | Individual | Sprint | Pursuit | Mass Start | Relay | Mixed Relay^{[a]} | Individual Events | Team Events | All Events |
|---|---|---|---|---|---|---|---|---|---|
| 1st place | 1 | 8 | 2 | 4 | 34 | 10 | 15 | 44 | 59 |
| 2nd place | 5 | 12 | 9 | 1 | 17 | 5 | 27 | 22 | 49 |
| 3rd place | 1 | 10 | 10 | 9 | 4 | 5 | 30 | 9 | 39 |
| Podiums | 7 | 30 | 21 | 14 | 55 | 20 | 72 | 75 | 147 |
| Starts | 43 | 120 | 98 | 65 | 61 | 21 | 326 | 82 | 408 |

* Results in all UIPMB and IBU World Cup races, Olympics and World Championships. Statistics as of 23 March 2025.

=== Shooting ===
| Shooting | 2008–09 season | | 2009–10 season | | 2010–11 season | | 2011–12 season | | 2012–13 season | | 2013–14 season | | 2014–15 season | | 2015–16 season | | 2016–17 season | | Career | |
|---|---|---|---|---|---|---|---|---|---|---|---|---|---|---|---|---|---|---|---|---|
| Prone position | 5 / 5 | 100% | 85 / 104 | 81.7% | 209 / 234 | 89.3% | 177 / 202 | 87.6% | 140 / 152 | 92.1% | 119 / 136 | 87.5% | 171 / 182 | 94.0% | 199 / 227 | 87.7% | 64 / 70 | 91.4% | 1169 / 1312 | 89.1% |
| Standing position | 2 / 5 | 40.0% | 84 / 103 | 81.6% | 195 / 237 | 82.3% | 158 / 203 | 77.8% | 132 / 154 | 85.7% | 117 / 140 | 83.6% | 152 / 187 | 81.3% | 186 / 224 | 83.0% | 58 / 73 | 79.5% | 1084 / 1326 | 81.7% |
| Total | 7 / 10 | 70.0% | 169 / 207 | 81.6% | 404 / 471 | 85.8% | 335 / 405 | 82.7% | 272 / 306 | 88.9% | 236 / 276 | 85.5% | 323 / 369 | 87.5% | 385 / 451 | 85.4% | 122 / 143 | 85.3% | 2253 / 2638 | 85.4% |

* Results in all IBU World Cup races, Olympics and World Championships including relay events and disqualified races. Statistics as of 19 March 2017.
