= Krzysztof Pływaczyk =

Polish biathlete (born 1983)

Personal information
- Born: February 11, 1983 Wałbrzych, Poland
- Height: 5 ft 11 in (180 cm)

Sport
- Sport: Skiing
- Club: BKS WP Koscielisko
- Updated on February 18, 2014

Krzysztof Pływaczyk (born 11 February 1983) is a Polish biathlete. He competed at the Biathlon World Championships 2011, 2012 and 2013. He competed at the 2006 in Turin and the 2014 Winter Olympics in Sochi, in sprint and individual.
