= Maxim Maksimov =

Russian biathlete and biathlon coach

Personal information
- Full name: Maxim Gennadyevich Maksimov
- Born: September 6, 1979 (age 46) Izhevsk, Soviet Union
- Height: 1.72 m (5 ft 7 1/2 in)

Sport
Medal record
Men's biathlon
Representing Russia
World Championships
Silver medal – second place	2011 Khanty-Mansiysk	Individual 20 km
Disqualified	2011 Khanty-Mansiysk	4×7.5 km relay
Bronze medal – third place	2008 Östersund	Individual 20 km
- Updated on March 8, 2011

Maxim Gennadyevich Maksimov (Russian: Максим Геннадьевич Максимов, born September 6, 1979, in Izhevsk) is a retired Russian biathlete and biathlon coach. He took two individual medals in the Biathlon World Championships, a bronze in 2008 and a silver in 2011: these were also his only podiums in the Biathlon World Cup. In 2019 he was appointed as an assistant coach to the Russian national biathlon team, having previously been a regional coach in the Yamalo-Nenets Autonomous Okrug.
