= Jarkko Kauppinen =

Finnish biathlete

Personal information
- Nationality: Finnish
- Born: 6 April 1982 (age 42); Vieremä

Sport
- Sport: Biathlon

Jarkko Kauppinen (born 6 April 1982) is a Finnish biathlete. He was born in Vieremä. He competed at the Biathlon World Championships 2011, 2012 and 2013. He competed at the 2014 Winter Olympics in Sochi, in sprint and individual.
