= Pavol Hurajt =

Slovak biathlete

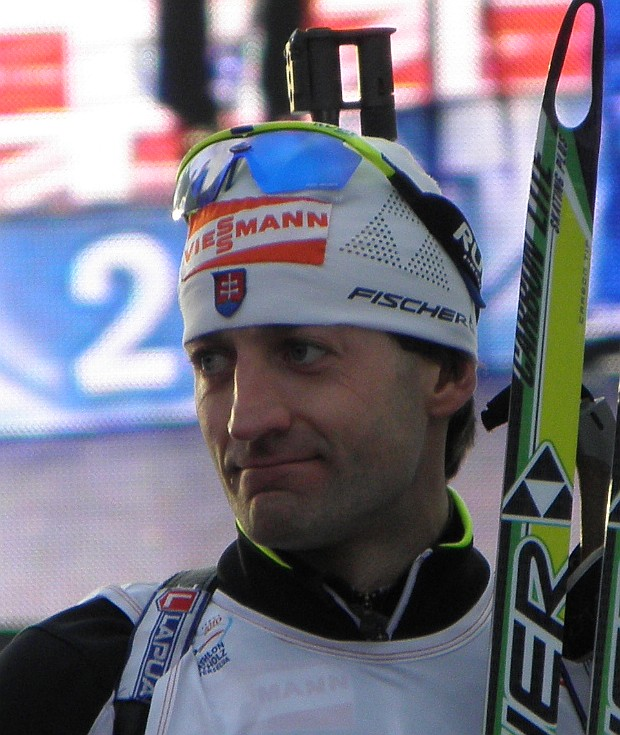

Personal information
- Full name: Pavol Hurajt
- Born: 4 February 1978 (age 48) Poprad, SSR, Czechoslovakia
- Height: 1.72 m (5 ft 8 in)

Sport

Professional information
- Sport: Biathlon
- Club: Dukla Banská Bystrica
- World Cup debut: 8 December 1999

Olympic Games
- Teams: 3 (2006, 2010, 2014)
- Medals: 1 (0 gold)

World Championships
- Teams: 12 (2000, 2001, 2003, 2004, 2005, 2007, 2008, 2009, 2010, 2011, 2012, 2013)
- Medals: 0

World Cup
- Seasons: 15 (1999/2000–2013/14)
- Individual victories: 0
- All victories: 0
- Individual podiums: 3
- All podiums: 3
Medal record
Men's biathlon
Representing Slovakia
Olympic Games
Silver medal – second place	2010 Vancouver	15 km mass start
Winter Universiade
Silver medal – second place	2003 Tarvisio	20 km individual
Bronze medal – third place	2001 Zakopane	12,5 km pursuit
Bronze medal – third place	2005 Innsbruck	20 km individual
Bronze medal – third place	2005 Innsbruck	4 x 7,5 km relay

Pavol Hurajt (born 4 February 1978) is a Slovak former biathlete. He finished third in the mass start at the 2010 Winter Olympics in Vancouver. In February 2026 he received the silver medal for the race, after the International Olympic Committee confirmed the disqualification of the winner, Evgeny Ustyugov, for doping.

== Biathlon results ==
All results are sourced from the International Biathlon Union.

=== Olympic Games ===
1 medal (1 silver)

Event	Individual	Sprint	Pursuit	Mass start	Relay	Mixed relay
(Italy) 2006 Turin	29th	29th	24th	—	14th	—N/a
(Canada) 2010 Vancouver	5th	7th	16th	Silver	15th	—N/a
(Russia) 2014 Sochi	28th	51st	52nd	—	12th	5th

*The mixed relay was added as an event in 2014.

=== World Championships ===
Event	Individual	Sprint	Pursuit	Mass start	Relay	Mixed relay
(Norway) 2000 Oslo Holmenkollen	76th	80th	—	—	—	—N/a
(Slovenia) 2001 Pokljuka	74th	68th	—	—	18th	—N/a
(Russia) 2003 Khanty-Mansiysk	23rd	19th	26th	—	14th	—N/a
(Germany) 2004 Oberhof	49th	74th	—	—	10th	—N/a
(Austria) 2005 Hochfilzen	83rd	70th	—	—	14th	16th
(Italy) 2007 Antholz-Anterselva	38th	83rd	—	—	15th	—
(Sweden) 2008 Östersund	46th	14th	20th	19th	9th	14th
(South Korea) 2009 Pyeongchang	40th	20th	53rd	—	12th	10th
(Russia) 2010 Khanty-Mansiysk	—N/a	—N/a	—N/a	—N/a	—N/a	14th
(Russia) 2011 Khanty-Mansiysk	23rd	96th	—	—	18th	12th
(Germany) 2012 Ruhpolding	78th	76th	—	—	12th	—
(Czech Republic) 2013 Nové Město	61st	49th	37th	—	10th	7th

*During Olympic seasons competitions are only held for those events not included in the Olympic program.
**Mixed relay was added as an event in 2005.

== Controversy ==
After retiring from his sports career, he and his wife Janka opened a traditional Slovak restaurant in the village of Štrba. However, their venture into hospitality has not been without scandal. At their chalet-style restaurant Žerucha, they reportedly served meat from a protected species, the brown bear. In a video, restaurant staff confirmed to reporters that obtaining bear meat only requires having the right contacts at the Tatra National Park Administration (TANAP), which is headed by a man with a criminal conviction for poaching wolves.

According to the civic initiative MY SME LES ("We Are the Forest"), Hurajt was selling meat from a protected animal without the required permit from the Ministry of the Environment.

The Ministry confirmed that while exemptions from the ban on commercial use of protected species, such as trading in bear meat, can be granted, this only happens when all legal conditions are met. "At present, the ministry has received no such exemption request. The exemption is typically issued to the seller, who then transfers the specimen to the buyer," the ministry stated. The Slovak Environmental Inspectorate stated that a violation of the law had been confirmed in this case, and the operator will be fined.
