= Serhiy Sednev =

Ukrainian biathlete (born 1983)

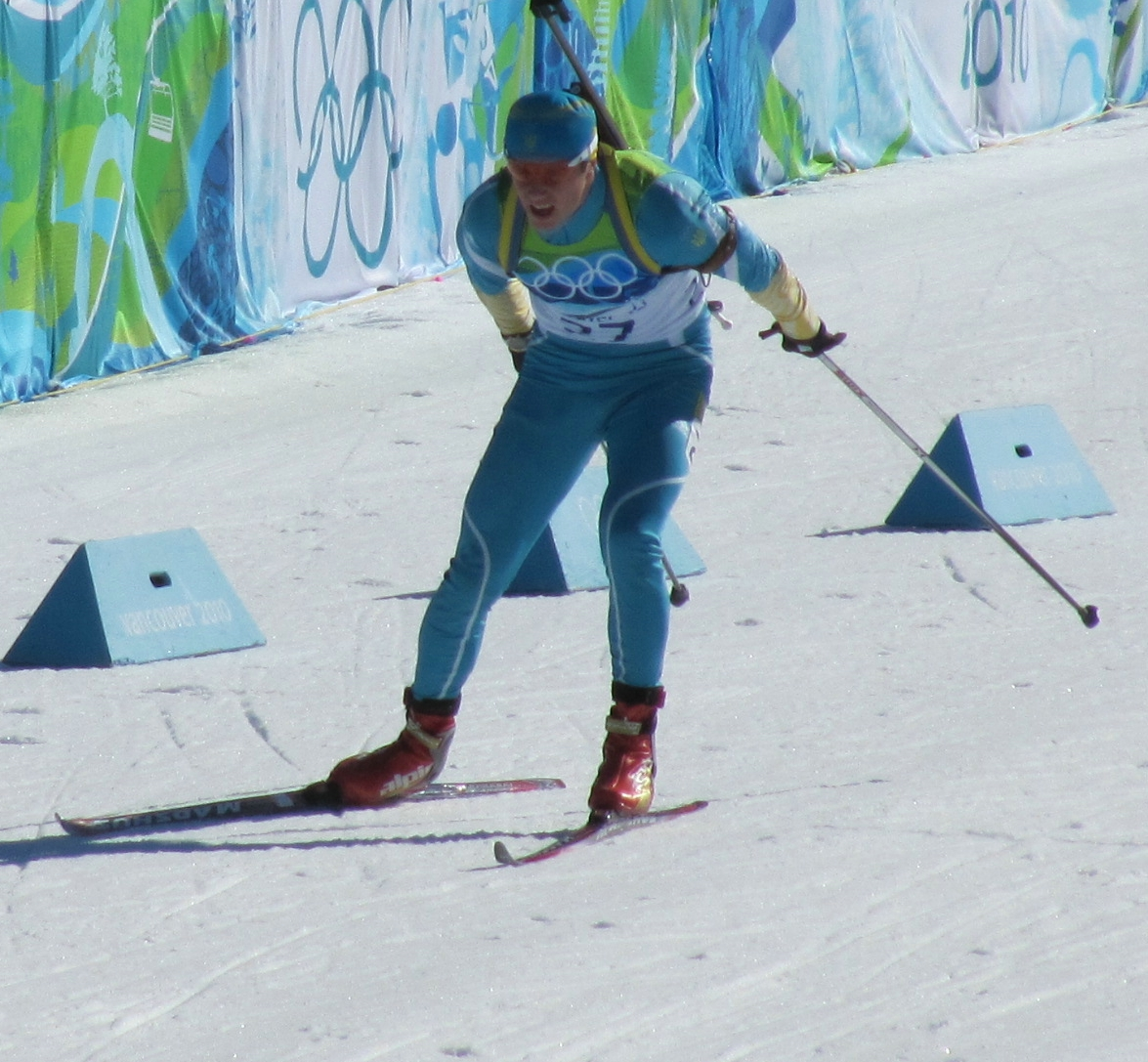

Personal information
- Full name: Serguei Anatoliyovich Sednev
- Born: 19 December 1983 (age 42) Hlukhiv, Soviet Union
- Height: 1.78 m (5 ft 10 in)

Sport

Professional information
- Club: Dynamo
- Skis: Fisher
Medal record
Men's biathlon
Representing Ukraine
World Championships
Silver medal – second place	2011 Khanty-Mansiysk	4 × 7.5 km relay
European Championships
Silver medal – second place	2004 Minsk	Junior 4 × 7.5 km relay
Silver medal – second place	2009 Ufa	12.5 km pursuit
Bronze medal – third place	2009 Ufa	20 km individual
Junior World Championships
Silver medal – second place	2004 Maurienne	12.5 km pursuit
Winter Universiade
Silver medal – second place	2007 Turin	20 km individual
Silver medal – second place	2007 Turin	Relay
Bronze medal – third place	2007 Turin	10 km sprint
Bronze medal – third place	2007 Turin	15 km mass start
- Updated on February 19, 2014

Serhiy Anatoliyovich Sednev (Ukrainian: Сергій Анатолійович Седнєв; born December 12, 1983, in Hlukhiv) is a retired Ukrainian biathlete.

== Career ==
He debuted for Ukraine at the World Cup on January 17, 2004, in Ruhpolding. In sprint he was the 67th. First World Cup podium was three years later - in December, 2007, he was third in individual race in Pokljuka. First World Cup win was in Antholz-Anterselva in individual on 21 January 2010. He is a bronze medalists of 2011 Biathlon World Championships in relay in which he was a "finisher". He had been a captain of men's national team for some years before he retired.

He unexpectedly retired on December 19, 2014, on his 31st birthday. In an interview for biathlon.com.ua he stated, that the first reason is absence of good results, and he had often been ill before the season. "At one moment I understood that I can't find any motivation to go on. Maybe, it is time to pay more attention to my family... that I couldn't afford this for a long years of my career".

== Doping ban ==
By IBU press release dated January 12, 2015, it was announced that Sednev had tested positive for recombinant EPO upon re-analysis of an out of competition sample originally taken on January 22, 2013. Sednev waved his is right for B-analysis and was subsequently banned for two years starting December 15, 2014. This effectively puts the start of his ban four days prior to his sudden retirement announcement.

== Performances ==
Level	Year	Event	IN	SP	PU	MS	RL	MRL
JBWCH	2002	Ridanna, Italy	28	5	9		12	
EBCH	2002	Kontiolahti, Finland	DNF				4	
JBWCH	2003	Kościelisko, Poland	4	30	18		7	
EBCH	2003	Forni Avoltri, Italy	DNF	6	8		4	
JBWCH	2004	Maurienne, France	22	7	3		5	
EBCH	2004	Minsk, Belarus	DNS	10	8		2	
BWCH	2007	Rasen-Antholz, Italy	42					
EBCH	2007	Bansko, Bulgaria		25	19			
BWCH	2008	Östersund, Sweden	67					
BWCH	2009	Pyeongchang, South Korea	47					
EBCH	2009	Ufa, Russia	3	15	2		4	
OLY	2010	Vancouver, Canada	68	22	10	21	8	
BWCH	2011	Khanty-Mansiysk, Russia		33	27	25	2	
BWCH	2012	Ruhpolding, Germany		84			8	
BWCH	2013	Nové Město na Moravě, Czech Republic	49	39	DNS		14	9
OLY	2014	Sochi, Russia		44	54			

=== World Cup ===
==== Podiums ====
Season	Place	Competition	Rank
2007–08	Pokljuka, Slovenia	Individual	3
2008–09	Hochfilzen, Austria	Relay	3
2009–10	Rasen-Antholz, Italy	Individual	1
2010–11	Hochfilzen, Austria	Sprint	2
2010–11	Pokljuka, Slovenia	Individual	3
2010–11	Pokljuka, Slovenia	Mixed relay	2
2011–12	Kontiolahti, Finland	Mixed relay	2

==== Positions ====
Season	Individual	Sprint	Pursuit	Mass starts	TOTAL
2007–08	11	69	48	43	46
2008–09	13	77	37		46
2009–10	4	28	21	29	22
2010–11	17	16	23	16	16
2011–12	48	46	61		54
2012–13	44	50	42		45
2013–14		85	85		93
