= Benjamin Weger =

Swiss biathlete (born 1989)

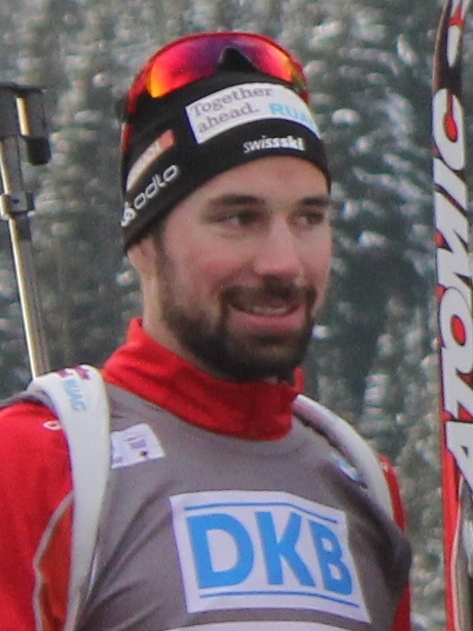
- Weger in 2015

Personal information
- Full name: Benjamin Weger
- Born: 5 October 1989 (age 36) Brig, Switzerland
- Height: 1.78 m (5 ft 10 in)

Sport

Professional information
- Sport: Biathlon
- Club: SC Obergoms
- World Cup debut: 10 February 2009

Olympic Games
- Teams: 3 (2010, 2014, 2018)
- Medals: 0 (0 gold)

World Championships
- Teams: 7
- Medals: 0 (0 gold)

World Cup
- Seasons: 13 (2009/10–2021/22)
- Individual victories: 0
- All victories: 0
- Individual podiums: 4
- All podiums: 0
- Overall titles: 0
Medal record
Men's biathlon
Junior World Championships
Silver medal – second place	2009 Canmore	10 km sprint
- Updated on February 18, 2018

Benjamin Weger (born 5 October 1989) is a Swiss former biathlete.

His first World Cup podium was in the Pokljuka 20 km individual 16 December 2010.

== Biathlon results ==
All results are sourced from the International Biathlon Union.

=== Olympic Games ===
0 medals

Event	Individual	Sprint	Pursuit	Mass start	Relay	Mixed relay
(Canada) 2010 Vancouver	55th	69th	—	—	9th	—
(Russia) 2014 Sochi	47th	62nd	—	—	14th	12th
(South Korea) 2018 Pyeongchang	6th	15th	6th	25th	15th	13th
(China) 2022 Beijing	19th	53rd				8th

*The mixed relay was added as an event in 2014.

=== World Championships ===
0 medals

Event	Individual	Sprint	Pursuit	Mass start	Relay	Mixed relay	Single mixed relay
(Russia) 2010 Khanty-Mansiysk	—N/a	—N/a	—N/a	—N/a	—N/a	13th	—N/a
(Russia) 2011 Khanty-Mansiysk	34th	52nd	33rd	—	17th	—	—N/a
(Germany) 2012 Ruhpolding	41st	36th	16th	DNF	7th	10th	—N/a
(Czech Republic) 2013 Nové Město	19th	25th	35th	27th	17th	11th	—N/a
(Finland) 2015 Kontiolahti	30th	13th	33rd	29th	7th	13th	—N/a
(Norway) 2016 Oslo Holmenkollen	49th	51st	DNF	—	10th	14th	—N/a
(Austria) 2017 Hochfilzen	10th	55th	53rd	—	16th	14th	—N/a
(Sweden) 2019 Östersund	44th	10th	8th	—	18th	11th	11th
(Italy) 2020 Antholz-Anterselva	5th	51st	59th	25th	—	10th	5th
(Slovenia) 2021 Pokljuka	46th	61st	—	—	11th	10th	9th

*During Olympic seasons competitions are only held for those events not included in the Olympic program.
