= Biathlon World Championships 2011 =

2011 edition of the Biathlon World Championships

- Host city: Khanty-Mansiysk
- Country: Russia
- Events: 11
- Opening: 3 March
- Closing: 13 March

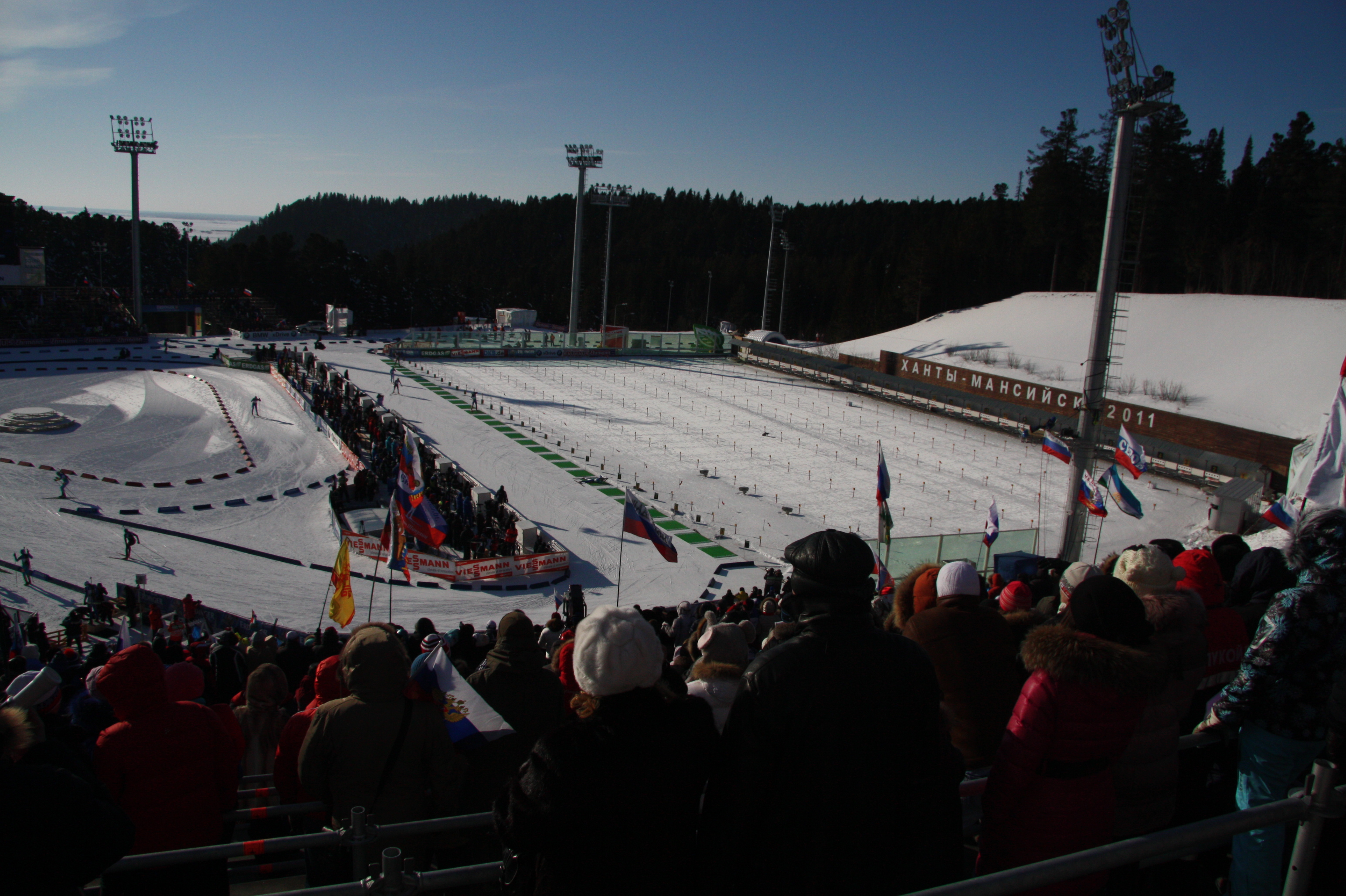
The Alexander Filipenko Winter Sport Center in Khanty-Mansiysk

The 44th Biathlon World Championships was held in Khanty-Mansiysk, Russia from March 3–13, 2011.

There was a total of 11 competitions: sprint, pursuit, individual, mass start, and relay races for men and women, and mixed relay. All the events during this championships also counted for the 2010–11 Biathlon World Cup season.

== Championship highlights ==
The Championships kicked off with the Mixed relay event which is seeking to make its way onto the Olympic programme for the 2014 games in Sochi. As the first event of the programme, it was finally given importance by the different teams, with all nations fielding their best teams, in difference to earlier world cup events. The Norwegians won it, overtaking Germany on the last leg. The veteran Ole Einar Bjørndalen won his fifteenth world championship gold medal in the process and his first in the mixed relay, giving him a full set of gold medals in the six events that are currently contested.

Tarjei Bø, Martin Fourcade, Kaisa Mäkäräinen and Arnd Peiffer won their first champion titles in career. Martin Fourcade also won a full scope of medals, gold, silver and bronze at these championships.

The surprise medalists included Maxim Maximov of Russia, Tina Bachmann of Germany and Vita Semerenko of Ukraine.

Helena Ekholm literally swept the field in the individual with zero shooting and fast skiing, winning more than 2 minutes over the runner-up Bachmann and making one of the greatest 1–2 place margins in biathlon history.

== Doping violations ==
After a lengthy investigation, Evgeny Ustyugov of Russia was found guilty of doping violations, resulting in the annulment of his results, including those from the 2010 and 2014 Winter Olympics and the 2011 World Championships. So, on 7 December 2025, Sweden was awarded the relay bronze medals, and on 13 December 2025, Ukraine was awarded the silver medals.

== Schedule of events ==
The provisional schedule of the event is below. All times in UTC+5.

Date	Time	Event
3 March	16:30	2 × 6 km + 2 × 7.5 km mixed relay
5 March	14:00	Men's 10 km sprint
5 March	18:00	Women's 7.5 km sprint
6 March	14:00	Men's 12.5 km pursuit
6 March	16:30	Women's 10 km pursuit
8 March	17:15	Men's 20 km individual
9 March	17:15	Women's 15 km individual
11 March	18:00	Men's 4 × 7.5 km relay
12 March	16:30	Women's 12.5 km mass start
12 March	18:30	Men's 15 km mass start
13 March	15:00	Women's 4 × 6 km relay

== Medal winners ==
=== Men ===
Event	Gold		Silver		Bronze	
10 km sprint	Arnd Peiffer; Germany	24:34.0 (0+1)	Martin Fourcade; France	24:47.0 (2+0)	Tarjei Bø; Norway	24:59.2 (1+0)
12.5 km pursuit	Martin Fourcade; France	33:02.6 (0+1+2+0)	Emil Hegle Svendsen; Norway	33:06.4 (0+0+1+1)	Tarjei Bø; Norway	33:07.8 (0+0+1+1)
20 km individual	Tarjei Bø; Norway	48:29.9 (0+0+1+0)	Maxim Maksimov; Russia	49:09.9 (0+0+0+0)	Christoph Sumann; Austria	49:15.4 (0+0+0+1)
4 × 7.5 km relay	Norway Ole Einar Bjørndalen; Alexander Os; Emil Hegle Svendsen; Tarjei Bø	1:16:13.9 (0+0) (0+0) (0+0) (1+3) (0+1) (0+2) (0+1) (1+3)	Ukraine Olexander Bilanenko; Andriy Deryzemlya; Serhiy Semenov; Serhiy Sednev	1:16:41.9 (0+1) (0+2) (0+1) (0+2) (0+0) (0+1) (0+2) (0+1	Sweden Fredrik Lindström; Magnus Jonsson; Carl Johan Bergman; Björn Ferry	1:16:45.7 (0+1) (0+2) (0+0) (0+3) (0+2) (0+3) (0+2) (0+2)
15 km mass start	Emil Hegle Svendsen; Norway	38:42.7 (0+0+0+1)	Lukas Hofer; Italy	38:57.0 (0+0+0+1)	Tarjei Bø; Norway	39:06.0 (0+0+0+2)

=== Women ===
Event	Gold		Silver		Bronze	
7.5 km sprint	Magdalena Neuner; Germany	20:31.2 (0+0)	Kaisa Mäkäräinen; Finland	20:43.4 (0+0)	Anastasiya Kuzmina; Slovakia	21:11.2 (0+1)
10 km pursuit	Kaisa Mäkäräinen; Finland	30:00.1 (0+0+0+0)	Magdalena Neuner; Germany	30:21.7 (0+0+0+2)	Helena Ekholm; Sweden	31:43.7 (0+0+0+0)
15 km individual	Helena Ekholm; Sweden	47:08.3 (0+0+0+0)	Tina Bachmann; Germany	49:24.1 (0+2+0+0)	Vita Semerenko; Ukraine	50:00.4 (1+0+0+2)
4 × 6 km relay	Germany Andrea Henkel; Miriam Gössner; Tina Bachmann; Magdalena Neuner	1:13:31.1 (0+2) (0+1) (0+2) (2+3) (0+2) (0+2) (0+1) (0+0)	France Anaïs Bescond; Marie-Laure Brunet; Sophie Boilley; Marie Dorin	1:14:18.3 (0+2) (0+1) (0+0) (0+0) (0+3) (0+2) (0+1) (0+0)	Belarus Nadezhda Skardino; Darya Domracheva; Nadzeya Pisarava; Liudmila Kalinchik	1:15:18.5 (0+0) (0+1) (0+1) (0+0) (0+0) (0+0) (0+1) (1+3)
12.5 km mass start	Magdalena Neuner; Germany	36:48.5 (0+1+2+1)	Darya Domracheva; Belarus	36:53.3 (2+1+0+0)	Tora Berger; Norway	37:02.5 (2+1+0+0)

=== Mixed ===
Event	Gold		Silver		Bronze	
2 × 6 + 2 × 7.5 km W+M relay	Norway Tora Berger; Ann Kristin Flatland; Ole Einar Bjørndalen; Tarjei Bø	1:14:22.5 (0+1) (0+0) (0+1) (0+1) (0+2) (0+1) (0+0) (0+1)	Germany Andrea Henkel; Magdalena Neuner; Arnd Peiffer; Michael Greis	1:14:45.4 (0+2) (0+0) (0+0) (0+0) (0+1) (0+2) (0+2) (0+1)	France Marie-Laure Brunet; Marie Dorin; Alexis Bœuf; Martin Fourcade	1:15:38.7 (0+2) (0+2) (0+0) (0+3) (0+0) (0+1) (0+0) (0+0)

== Medal table ==
=== Top nations ===
Rank	Nation	Gold	Silver	Bronze	Total
1	Germany (GER)	4	3	0	7
2	Norway (NOR)	4	1	4	9
3	France (FRA)	1	2	1	4
4	Finland (FIN)	1	1	0	2
5	Sweden (SWE)	1	0	2	3
6	Belarus (BLR)	0	1	1	2
6	Ukraine (UKR)	0	1	1	2
8	Italy (ITA)	0	1	0	1
8	Russia (RUS)	0	1	0	1
10	Austria (AUT)	0	0	1	1
10	Slovakia (SVK)	0	0	1	1
Totals (11 entries)		11	11	11	33

=== Top athletes ===
All athletes with two or more medals.

Rank	Biathlete	Gold	Silver	Bronze	Total
1	Magdalena Neuner (GER)	3	2	0	5
2	Tarjei Bø (NOR)	3	0	3	6
3	Emil Hegle Svendsen (NOR)	2	1	0	3
4	Ole Einar Bjørndalen (NOR)	2	0	0	2
5	Martin Fourcade (FRA)	1	1	1	3
6	Andrea Henkel (GER)	1	1	0	2
6	Arnd Peiffer (GER)	1	1	0	2
6	Kaisa Mäkäräinen (FIN)	1	1	0	2
6	Tina Bachmann (GER)	1	1	0	2
10	Helena Ekholm (SWE)	1	0	1	2
10	Tora Berger (NOR)	1	0	1	2
12	Darya Domracheva (BLR)	0	1	1	2
12	Marie Dorin (FRA)	0	1	1	2
12	Marie-Laure Brunet (FRA)	0	1	1	2

== Participating countries ==
40 nations competed.

- Andorra
- Armenia
- Australia
- Austria
- Belarus
- Bosnia and Herzegovina
- Bulgaria
- Canada
- China
- Croatia
- Czech Republic
- Estonia
- Finland
- France
- Germany
- Great Britain
- Greenland
- Hungary
- Italy
- Japan
- Kazakhstan
- Latvia
- Lithuania
- Macedonia
- Moldova
- New Zealand
- Norway
- Poland
- Romania
- Russia
- Serbia
- Slovakia
- Slovenia
- South Korea
- Spain
- Sweden
- Switzerland
- Turkey
- Ukraine
- United States

== See also ==
- 2011 IPC Biathlon and Cross-Country Skiing World Championships
