= 2012–13 Biathlon World Cup – Relay Women =

The 2012–13 Biathlon World Cup – Relay Women will start at Sunday December 9, 2012 in Hochfilzen and will finish Friday March 10, 2012 in Sochi. Defending titlist is French team.

== Competition format ==
The relay teams consist of four biathletes, who each ski 7.5 kilometres (4.7 mi), each leg skied over three laps, with two shooting rounds; one prone, one standing. For every round of five targets there are eight bullets available, though the last three can only be single-loaded manually one at a time from spare round holders or bullets deposited by the competitor into trays or onto the mat at the firing line. If after eight bullets there are still misses, one 150 m penalty loop must be taken for each missed target remaining. The first-leg participants start all at the same time, and as in cross-country skiing relays, every athlete of a team must touch the team's next-leg participant to perform a valid changeover. On the first shooting stage of the first leg, the participant must shoot in the lane corresponding to their bib number (Bib #10 shoots at lane #10 regardless of position in race.), then for the remainder of the relay, the relay team shoots at the lane in the position they arrived (Arrive at the range in 5th place, you shoot at lane five.).

== 2011–12 Top 3 Standings ==
Medal	Country	Points
Gold:	France	216
Silver:	Norway	205
Bronze:	Russia	192

== Medal winners ==
Event:	Gold:	Time	Silver:	Time	Bronze:	Time
Hochfilzen details	Norway; Fanny Welle-Strand Horn; Synnøve Solemdal; Hilde Fenne; Tora Berger	1:11:45.1 (0+0) (0+0) (0+1) (0+2) (0+1) (0+0) (0+0) (0+1)	Ukraine; Vita Semerenko; Valj Semerenko; Juliya Dzhyma; Olena Pidhrushna	1:12:15.5 (0+0) (0+1) (0+0) (0+3) (0+0) (0+0) (0+0) (0+0)	Russia; Ekaterina Glazyrina; Olga Zaitseva; Ekaterina Shumilova; Olga Vilukhina	1:12:30.5 (0+0) (0+0) (0+0) (0+0) (0+0) (0+3) (0+1) (0+0)
Oberhof details	Ukraine; Juliya Dzhyma; Valj Semerenko; Olena Pidhrushna; Vita Semerenko	1:20:16.1 (0+0) (0+1) (0+1) (0+1) (0+0) (0+1) (0+0) (0+1)	France; Marie-Laure Brunet; Anais Bescond; Sophie Boilley; Marie Dorin-Habert	1:21:02.0 (0+0) (0+2) (0+0) (0+0) (0+1) (0+1) (0+0) (0+0)	Germany; Tina Bachmann; Miriam Gössner; Franziska Hildebrand; Nadine Horchler	1:22:03.4 (0+0) (0+0) (0+0) (2+3) (0+1) (0+1) (0+1) (0+2)
Ruhpolding details	Norway; Hilde Fenne; Ann Kristin Flatland; Synnøve Solemdal; Tora Berger	1:08:13.2 (0+0) (0+0) (0+1) (0+0) (0+2) (0+1) (0+0) (0+0)	Russia; Ekaterina Glazyrina; Olga Vilukhina; Ekaterina Shumilova; Olga Zaitseva	1:09:07.9 (0+0) (0+0) (0+0) (0+0) (0+0) (0+0) (0+1) (0+0)	Czech Republic; Veronika Vítková; Gabriela Soukalová; Kristýna Černá; Veronika Zvařičová	1:10:05.0 (0+2) (0+1) (0+0) (0+0) (0+2) (0+1) (0+3) (0+2)
Antholtz details	Germany; Franziska Hildebrand; Miriam Gössner; Nadine Horchler; Andrea Henkel	1:13:02.1 (0+1) (0+1) (0+3) (0+1) (0+0) (0+0) (0+3) (0+1)	Russia; Ekaterina Glazyrina; Olga Zaitseva; Ekaterina Shumilova; Olga Vilukhina	1:13:19.5 (0+1) (0+1) (0+0) (0+1) (0+1) (0+1) (0+1) (0+3)	France; Anais Bescond; Sophie Boilley; Marie-Laure Brunet; Marie Dorin-Habert	1:13:43.0 (0+0) (0+2) (0+0) (0+0) (0+0) (0+0) (0+0) (0+2)
World Championships 2013 details	Norway; Hilde Fenne; Ann Kristin Flatland; Synnøve Solemdal; Tora Berger	1:08:11.0 (0+2) (1+3) (0+0) (0+2) (0+0) (0+1) (0+0) (0+1)	Ukraine; Juliya Dzhyma; Vita Semerenko; Valj Semerenko; Olena Pidhrushna	1:08:18.0 (0+0) (0+1) (0+2) (0+0) (0+1) (0+0) (0+0) (0+1)	Italy; Dorothea Wierer; Nicole Gontier; Michela Ponza; Karin Oberhofer	1:08:22.6 (0+0) (0+0) (0+2) (0+0) (0+0) (0+2) (0+0) (0+0)
Sochi details	Germany; Andrea Henkel; Evi Sachenbacher-Stehle; Miriam Gössner; Laura Dahlmeier	1:09:27.1 (0+1) (0+0) (0+0) (0+2) (0+1) (1+3) (0+0) (0+0)	Ukraine; Juliya Dzhyma; Olena Pidhrushna; Valj Semerenko; Mariya Panfilova	1:09:39.0 (0+0) (0+1) (0+0) (0+1) (0+1) (0+2) (0+0) (0+1)	Norway; Hilde Fenne; Tiril Eckhoff; Ann Kristin Flatland; Tora Berger	1:09:48.3 (0+1) (0+2) (0+0) (0+3) (0+1) (0+1) (0+0) (0+2)

== Standings ==
#	Name	HOC	OBE	RUP	ANT	WCH	SOC	Total
1	Norway	60	43	60	43	60	48	314
2	Ukraine	54	60	36	40	54	54	298
3	Germany	43	48	43	60	40	60	294
4	Russia	48	40	54	54	43	38	277
5	France	40	54	38	48	38	40	258
6	Italy	30	38	40	34	48	36	226
7	Poland	38	36	31	38	32	43	218
8	Belarus	36	34	34	36	36	34	210
9	Czech Republic	31	30	48	26	31	32	198
10	Sweden	32	31	25	29	26	30	173
11	Kazakhstan	27	28	29	22	27	29	162
12	Slovakia	34	32	32	25	34	—	157
13	Canada	28	—	27	30	29	31	145
14	Bulgaria	20	25	22	24	23	25	139
15	Estonia	22	24	20	21	21	27	135
16	Romania	24	29	21	28	0	26	128
17	United States	29	—	28	31	30	—	118
18	Austria	26	—	30	32	22	—	110
19	China	—	27	26	27	25	—	105
20	Switzerland	25	26	24	—	28	—	103
21	Finland	23	—	23	—	20	28	94
22	Japan	21	—	—	23	19	24	87
23	South Korea	—	23	19	20	17	—	79
24	Slovenia	—	—	—	—	24	—	24
25	Lithuania	—	—	—	—	18	—	18
