= 2012–13 Biathlon World Cup – Mass start Women =

The 2012–13 Biathlon World Cup – Mass start Women will start at December 16, 2012 in Pokljuka and will finish in Khanty-Mansiysk. Defending titlist is Darya Domracheva of Belarus.

== Competition format ==
In the mass start, all biathletes start at the same time and the first across the finish line wins. In this 12.5 kilometres (7.8 mi) competition, the distance is skied over five laps; there are four bouts of shooting (two prone, two standing, in that order) with the first shooting bout being at the lane corresponding to your bib (Bib #10 shoots at lane #10 regardless of position in race.) with rest of the shooting bouts being at the lane in the position they arrived (Arrive at the lane in fifth place, you shoot at lane five.). As in sprint races, competitors must ski one 150 m penalty loop for each miss. Here again, to avoid unwanted congestion, World Cup Mass starts are held with only the 30 top ranking athletes on the start line (half that of the Pursuit as here all contestants start simultaneously).

== 2011–12 Top 3 Standings ==
Medal	Athlete	Points
Gold:	(Belarus) Darya Domracheva	250
Silver:	(Norway) Tora Berger	241
Bronze:	(France) Marie Laure Brunet	198

== Medal winners ==
Event:	Gold:	Time	Silver:	Time	Bronze:	Time
Pokljuka details	Tora Berger; Norway	35:53.8 (0+2+0+0)	Miriam Gössner; Germany	36:29.3 (0+3+0+1)	Gabriela Soukalová; Czech Republic	36:55.9 (0+2+0+0)
Ruhpolding details	Tora Berger; Norway	37:14.4 (0+0+1+0)	Darya Domracheva; Belarus	37:41.1 (1+0+1+0)	Olga Zaitseva; Russia	37:52.2 (0+0+0+1)
World Championships details	Darya Domracheva; Belarus	35:54.5 (1+0+0+1)	Tora Berger; Norway	36:03.2 (1+0+1+0)	Monika Hojnisz; Poland	36:22.1 (0+0+1+0)
Holmenkollen details	Tora Berger; Norway	36:58.8 (0+0+0+2)	Anastasiya Kuzmina; Slovakia	37:04.2 (0+2+0+0)	Darya Domracheva; Belarus	37:22.1 (0+1+2+0)
Khanty-Mansiysk details	Gabriela Soukalová; Czech Republic	38:22.4 (0+0+0+0)	Marie Dorin Habert; France	38:33.6 (0+0+1+0)	Kaisa Mäkäräinen; Finland	38:45.3 (0+0+1+1)

== Standings ==
#	Name	POK	RUH	WCH	HOL	KHA	Total
1	Tora Berger (NOR)	60	60	54	60	28	262
2	Darya Domracheva (BLR)	20	54	60	48	18	200
3	Vita Semerenko (UKR)	21	43	43	38	40	185
4	Marie Dorin Habert (FRA)	32	29	32	28	54	175
5	Kaisa Mäkäräinen (FIN)	27	38	24	34	48	171
6	Teja Gregorin (SLO)	38	40	34	32	27	171
7	Gabriela Soukalová (CZE)	48	11	23	24	60	166
8	Miriam Gössner (GER)	54	34	38	22	12	160
9	Anastasiya Kuzmina (SVK)	28	32	26	54	17	157
10	Olga Zaitseva (RUS)	43	48	40	—	19	150
11	Anaïs Bescond (FRA)	31	22	27	43	25	148
12	Andrea Henkel (GER)	30	28	28	29	32	147
13	Krystyna Pałka (POL)	36	26	36	19	29	146
14	Olena Pidhrushna (UKR)	16	31	30	40	24	141
15	Olga Vilukhina (RUS)	34	27	18	—	43	122
16	Selina Gasparin (SUI)	23	36	—	25	38	122
17	Veronika Vítková (CZE)	25	24	22	27	21	119
18	Jana Gerekova (SVK)	14	20	31	17	23	105
19	Karin Oberhofer (ITA)	18	—	21	36	22	97
20	Ekaterina Glazyrina (RUS)	26	14	20	—	34	94
21	Magdalena Gwizdon (POL)	15	19	14	31	13	92
22	Nadezhda Skardino (BLR)	17	21	15	23	14	90
23	Valj Semerenko (UKR)	—	25	0	30	30	85
24	Weronika Nowakowska-Ziemniak (POL)	13	15	29	—	20	77
25	Tiril Eckhoff (NOR)	22	—	—	21	31	74
26	Synnøve Solemdal (NOR)	12	23	25	11	—	71
27	Ekaterina Shumilova (RUS)	29	17	12	—	—	58
28	Ekaterina Yurlova (RUS)	40	13	—	—	—	53
29	Laura Dahlmeier (GER)	—	—	—	14	36	50
30	Sophie Boilley (FRA)	24	—	—	26	—	50
31	Franziska Hildebrand (GER)	—	—	19	15	16	50
32	Monika Hojnisz (POL)	—	—	48	—	—	48
33	Fanny Welle-Strand Horn (NOR)	—	30	—	18	—	48
34	Nadine Horchler (GER)	—	—	—	20	15	35
35	Marie-Laure Brunet (FRA)	—	18	13	—	—	31
36	Juliya Dzhyma (UKR)	—	—	—	—	26	26
37	Rosanna Crawford (CAN)	19	—	—	—	—	19
38	Ann Kristin Flatland (NOR)	—	—	17	—	—	17
39	Zhang Yan (CHN)	—	—	16	—	—	16
39	Mari Laukkanen (FIN)	—	16	—	—	—	16
39	Michela Ponza (ITA)	—	—	—	16	—	16
42	Mariya Panfilova (UKR)	—	—	—	13	—	13
43	Andreja Mali (SLO)	—	12	—	—	—	12
43	Natalya Burdyga (UKR)	—	—	—	12	—	12
45	Agnieszka Cyl (POL)	11	—	—	—	—	11
45	Darya Usanova (KAZ)	—	—	—	—	11	11
