= 2012–13 Biathlon World Cup – Relay Men =

The 2012–13 Biathlon World Cup – Relay Men will start at Sunday December 9, 2012 in Hochfilzen and will finish Friday March 10, 2013 in Sochi. Defending titlist is French team.

== Competition format ==
The relay teams consist of four biathletes, who each ski 7.5 kilometres (4.7 mi), each leg skied over three laps, with two shooting rounds; one prone, one standing. For every round of five targets there are eight bullets available, though the last three can only be single-loaded manually one at a time from spare round holders or bullets deposited by the competitor into trays or onto the mat at the firing line. If after eight bullets there are still misses, one 150 m penalty loop must be taken for each missed target remaining. The first-leg participants start all at the same time, and as in cross-country skiing relays, every athlete of a team must touch the team's next-leg participant to perform a valid changeover. On the first shooting stage of the first leg, the participant must shoot in the lane corresponding to their bib number (Bib #10 shoots at lane #10 regardless of position in race.), then for the remainder of the relay, the relay team shoots at the lane in the position they arrived (Arrive at the range in 5th place, you shoot at lane five.).

== 2011–12 Top 3 Standings ==
Medal	Country	Points
Gold:	France	198
Silver:	Norway	190
Bronze:	Russia	189

== Medal winners ==
Event:	Gold:	Time	Silver:	Time	Bronze:	Time
Hochfilzen details	Norway; Lars Helge Birkeland; Ole Einar Bjørndalen; Vetle Sjåstad Christiansen; Henrik L'Abée-Lund	1:17:55.2 (0+0) (0+0) (0+0) (1+0) (0+0) (0+0) (0+0) (0+0)	France; Vincent Jay; Jean-Guillaume Béatrix; Alexis Bœuf; Martin Fourcade	1:18:29.7 (0+0) (0+0) (0+0) (3+0) (1+0) (1+0) (1+0) (0+0)	Russia; Anton Shipulin; Andrei Makoveev; Evgeny Ustyugov; Dmitry Malyshko	1:18:41.8 (0+0) (0+0) (2+0) (3+0) (0+0) (0+0) (2+0) (2+0)
Oberhof details	Russia; Alexey Volkov; Evgeniy Garanichev; Anton Shipulin; Dmitry Malyshko	1:20:35.7 (2+0) (1+0) (0+0) (3+0) (1+0) (2+0) (2+0) (1+0)	Norway; Henrik L'Abée-Lund; Ole Einar Bjørndalen; Erlend Bjøntegaard; Emil Hegle Svendsen	1:20:44.1 (0+0) (3+1) (0+0) (0+0) (1+0) (1+0) (0+0) (3+0)	Germany; Simon Schempp; Erik Lesser; Arnd Peiffer; Florian Graf	1:21:15.0 (3+0) (0+0) (0+0) (0+0) (3+0) (1+0) (2+0) (0+0)
Ruhpolding details	France; Simon Fourcade; Jean-Guillaume Béatrix; Alexis Bœuf; Martin Fourcade	1:13:11.2 (0+0) (0+0) (1+0) (1+0) (0+0) (1+0) (1+0) (0+0)	Norway; Lars Helge Birkeland; Tarjei Bø; Henrik L'Abée-Lund; Emil Hegle Svendsen	1:13:20.6 (0+0) (0+0) (0+0) (3+0) (1+0) (0+0) (1+0) (3+0)	Austria; Simon Eder; Friedrich Pinter; Dominik Landertinger; Christoph Sumann	1:13:20.9 (0+0) (2+0) (2+0) (1+0) (0+0) (1+0) (3+0) (0+0)
Antholtz details	France; Simon Fourcade; Jean-Guillaume Béatrix; Alexis Bœuf; Martin Fourcade	1:13:26.0 (0+0) (0+1) (0+0) (0+2) (0+0) (0+1) (0+2) (0+2)	Russia; Anton Shipulin; Evgeny Ustyugov; Evgeniy Garanichev; Dmitry Malyshko	1:13:36.1 (0+2) (0+0) (0+0) (0+3) (0+0) (0+1) (0+0) (0+2)	Austria; Simon Eder; Christoph Sumann; Daniel Mesotitsch; Dominik Landertinger	1:14:44.5 (0+0) (0+2) (0+1) (0+1) (0+0) (0+1) (0+0) (1+3)
World Championships 2013 details	Norway; Ole Einar Bjørndalen; Henrik L'Abée-Lund; Tarjei Bø; Emil Hegle Svendsen	1:15:39.0 (0+1) (0+2) (0+0) (0+0) (0+1) (0+0) (0+0) (0+1)	France; Simon Fourcade; Jean-Guillaume Béatrix; Alexis Bœuf; Martin Fourcade	1:16:51.8 (0+0) (0+3) (0+0) (0+1) (0+0) (0+1) (0+0) (0+2)	Germany; Simon Schempp; Andreas Birnbacher; Arnd Peiffer; Erik Lesser	1:16:57.5 (0+0) (0+0) (0+0) (0+0) (0+0) (0+0) (0+0) (2+3)
Sochi details	Russia; Anton Shipulin; Alexandr Loginov; Dmitry Malyshko; Evgeny Ustyugov	1:09:50.8 (1+0) (1+0) (3+1) (1+0) (0+0) (0+0) (0+0) (0+0)	Germany; Erik Lesser; Andreas Birnbacher; Arnd Peiffer; Benedikt Doll	1:10:29.1 (3+0) (0+0) (1+0) (0+0) (0+0) (1+0) (2+0) (3+0)	Czech Republic; Michal Šlesingr; Jaroslav Soukup; Vit Janov; Ondřej Moravec	1:10:33.7 (2+0) (2+0) (3+0) (1+0) (3+0) (1+0) (0+0) (1+0)

== Standings ==
#	Name	HOC	OBE	RUP	ANT	WCH	SOC	Total
1	Russia	48	60	40	54	43	60	305
2	Norway	60	54	54	31	60	43	302
3	France	54	28	60	60	54	40	296
4	Germany	38	48	43	36	48	54	267
5	Austria	43	30	48	48	40	34	243
6	Czech Republic	40	34	28	38	38	48	226
7	Sweden	32	36	38	43	30	36	215
8	Ukraine	31	43	36	34	27	29	200
9	Italy	34	27	30	30	36	38	195
10	Slovakia	36	32	31	32	31	32	194
11	United States	24	40	27	29	29	31	180
12	Slovenia	23	38	34	27	28	30	180
13	Bulgaria	29	29	29	26	32	28	173
14	Belarus	27	31	32	28	26	27	171
15	Switzerland	30	26	24	40	23	—	143
16	Kazakhstan	26	24	22	22	21	25	140
17	Canada	28	—	26	25	34	26	139
18	Estonia	25	18	21	24	25	24	137
19	Japan	17	21	23	23	15	23	122
20	Romania	16	19	18	18	22	22	115
21	Latvia	21	23	20	—	19	21	104
22	Finland	22	25	25	—	20	—	92
23	Poland	18	22	19	20	13	—	92
24	Great Britain	19	20	16	17	18	—	90
25	China	—	—	17	21	24	—	62
26	Lithuania	20	—	15	—	16	—	51
27	Serbia	—	—	—	19	14	—	33
28	South Korea	—	—	—	—	17	—	17
29	Spain	—	—	—	—	12	—	12
