= 2012–13 Biathlon World Cup – Mass start Men =

The 2012–13 Biathlon World Cup – Mass start Men will start at December 16, 2012 in Pokljuka. Defending titlist is Andreas Birnbacher of Germany.

== Competition format ==
In the mass start, all biathletes start at the same time and the first across the finish line wins. In this 15.0 kilometres (9.3 mi) competition, the distance is skied over five laps; there are four bouts of shooting (two prone, two standing, in that order) with the first shooting bout being at the lane corresponding to your bib (Bib #10 shoots at lane #10 regardless of position in race.) with rest of the shooting bouts being at the lane in the position they arrived (Arrive at the lane in fifth place, you shoot at lane five.). As in sprint races, competitors must ski one 150 m penalty loop for each miss. Here again, to avoid unwanted congestion, World Cup Mass starts are held with only the 30 top ranking athletes on the start line (half that of the Pursuit as here all contestants start simultaneously).

== 2011–12 Top 3 Standings ==
| Medal | Athlete | Points |
|---|---|---|
| Gold: | (Germany) Andreas Birnbacher | 260 |
| Silver: | (Norway) Emil Hegle Svendsen | 218 |
| Bronze: | (France) Martin Fourcade | 202 |

== Medal winners ==
| Event: | Gold: | Time | Silver: | Time | Bronze: | Time |
|---|---|---|---|---|---|---|
| Pokljuka details | Andreas Birnbacher; Germany | 35:39.4 (0+0+0+0) | Jakov Fak; Slovenia | 35:57.1 (0+0+1+1) | Tim Burke; United States | 36:02.0 (0+0+1+1) |
| Ruhpolding details | Martin Fourcade; France | 36:27.7 (0+0+0+0) | Dmitry Malyshko; Russia | 36:28.2 (1+0+0+0) | Emil Hegle Svendsen; Norway | 36:38.3 (0+1+1+0) |
| World Championships details | Tarjei Bø; Norway | 36:15.8 (0+0+0+0) | Anton Shipulin; Russia | 36:19.5 (0+0+1+0) | Emil Hegle Svendsen; Norway | 36:23.2 (0+1+0+0) |
| Holmenkollen details | Ondřej Moravec; Czech Republic | 39:48.7 (0+0+0+1) | Martin Fourcade; France | 40:02.4 (1+0+0+2) | Erik Lesser; Germany | 40:05.5 (0+0+1+0) |
| Khanty-Mansiysk details | Martin Fourcade; France | 41:51.4 (0+1+0+0) | Dominik Landertinger; Austria | 42:05.3 (0+0+1+0) | Emil Hegle Svendsen; Norway | 42:08.7 (0+0+1+0) |

== Standings ==
| # | Name | POK | RUH | WCH | HOL | KHA | Total |
|---|---|---|---|---|---|---|---|
| 1 | Martin Fourcade (FRA) | 43 | 60 | 31 | 54 | 60 | 248 |
| 2 | Emil Hegle Svendsen (NOR) | 38 | 48 | 48 | — | 48 | 182 |
| 3 | Tim Burke (USA) | 48 | 22 | 11 | 43 | 43 | 167 |
| 4 | Andreas Birnbacher (GER) | 60 | 36 | 30 | 23 | 14 | 163 |
| 5 | Ondřej Moravec (CZE) | 14 | 16 | 43 | 60 | 29 | 162 |
| 6 | Tarjei Bø (NOR) | — | 27 | 60 | 36 | 36 | 159 |
| 7 | Dominik Landertinger (AUT) | 18 | 30 | 38 | 15 | 54 | 155 |
| 8 | Jakov Fak (SLO) | 54 | 38 | 22 | 25 | 15 | 154 |
| 9 | Simon Eder (AUT) | 25 | 21 | 23 | 31 | 40 | 140 |
| 10 | Björn Ferry (SWE) | 40 | 32 | 34 | 12 | 19 | 137 |
| 11 | Jean-Guillaume Béatrix (FRA) | 22 | 24 | 36 | 34 | 18 | 134 |
| 12 | Fredrik Lindström (SWE) | 26 | 18 | 29 | 32 | 28 | 133 |
| 13 | Erik Lesser (GER) | 17 | 11 | 40 | 48 | 13 | 129 |
| 14 | Dmitry Malyshko (RUS) | 27 | 54 | 26 | — | 20 | 127 |
| 15 | Anton Shipulin (RUS) | 19 | 13 | 54 | — | 34 | 120 |
| 16 | Andriy Deryzemlya (UKR) | — | 25 | 21 | 38 | 30 | 114 |
| 17 | Simon Schempp (GER) | 24 | 40 | 27 | 11 | — | 102 |
| 18 | Evgeniy Garanichev (RUS) | 34 | 19 | 16 | — | 32 | 101 |
| 19 | Michal Šlesingr (CZE) | 23 | 23 | — | 22 | 31 | 99 |
| 20 | Arnd Peiffer (GER) | 11 | 26 | 18 | 19 | 23 | 97 |
| 21 | Alexis Bœuf (FRA) | 21 | 43 | 13 | 16 | — | 93 |
| 22 | Florian Graf (GER) | 31 | 17 | — | 24 | 21 | 93 |
| 23 | Lukas Hofer (ITA) | — | 29 | 20 | 27 | 17 | 93 |
| 24 | Simon Fourcade (FRA) | — | — | 32 | 21 | 38 | 91 |
| 25 | Henrik L'Abée-Lund (NOR) | 32 | 34 | 24 | — | — | 90 |
| 26 | Ole Einar Bjørndalen (NOR) | 29 | — | 17 | 28 | 16 | 90 |
| 27 | Evgeny Ustyugov (RUS) | 36 | 28 | 25 | — | — | 89 |
| 28 | Andrei Makoveev (RUS) | 15 | 12 | — | 40 | 11 | 78 |
| 29 | Lowell Bailey (USA) | — | — | 28 | 14 | 27 | 69 |
| 30 | Friedrich Pinter (AUT) | 30 | 14 | — | 20 | — | 64 |
| 31 | Carl Johan Bergman (SWE) | 28 | 20 | — | — | 12 | 60 |
| 32 | Jean-Philippe Leguellec (CAN) | 20 | — | 19 | 17 | — | 56 |
| 33 | Daniel Mesotitsch (AUT) | — | — | — | 30 | 24 | 54 |
| 34 | Lars Helge Birkeland (NOR) | — | 31 | — | — | — | 31 |
| 35 | Alexey Volkov (RUS) | — | — | — | 29 | — | 29 |
| 36 | Christoph Sumann (AUT) | — | — | — | — | 26 | 26 |
| 36 | Alexandr Loginov (RUS) | — | — | — | 26 | — | 26 |
| 38 | Vetle Sjåstad Christiansen (NOR) | — | — | — | — | 25 | 25 |
| 39 | Alexey Slepov (RUS) | — | — | — | — | 22 | 22 |
| 40 | Daniel Böhm (GER) | — | — | — | 18 | — | 18 |
| 41 | Julian Eberhard (AUT) | 16 | — | — | — | — | 16 |
| 42 | Klemen Bauer (SLO) | — | — | 15 | — | — | 15 |
| 42 | Scott Perras (CAN) | — | 15 | — | — | — | 15 |
| 44 | Benjamin Weger (SUI) | — | — | 14 | — | — | 14 |
| 45 | Vladimir Iliev (BUL) | 13 | — | — | — | — | 13 |
| 45 | Andrejs Rastorgujevs (LAT) | — | — | — | 13 | — | 13 |
| 47 | Lars Berger (NOR) | 12 | — | — | — | — | 12 |
| 47 | Tomas Kaukėnas (LTU) | — | — | 12 | — | — | 12 |
