= 2012–13 Biathlon World Cup – Individual Women =

The 2012–13 Biathlon World Cup – Individual Women started at Thursday November 29, 2012 in Östersund and will finish in Sochi. Defending titlist is Helena Ekholm of Sweden.

== Competition format ==
The 20 kilometres (12 mi) individual race is the oldest biathlon event; the distance is skied over five laps. The biathlete shoots four times at any shooting lane, in the order of prone, standing, prone, standing, totalling 20 targets. For each missed target a fixed penalty time, usually one minute, is added to the skiing time of the biathlete. Competitors' starts are staggered, normally by 30 seconds.

== 2011-12 Top 3 Standings ==
Medal	Athlete	Points
Gold:	(Sweden) Helena Ekholm	138
Silver:	(Finland) Kaisa Mäkäräinen	116
Bronze:	(Belarus) Darya Domracheva	116

== Medal winners ==
Event:	Gold:	Time	Silver:	Time	Bronze:	Time
Östersund details	Tora Berger; Norway	44:33.5 (0+0+0+0)	Darya Domracheva; Belarus	45:36.7 (1+0+0+1)	Ekaterina Glazyrina; Russia	46:43.7 (0+0+0+0)
Biathlon World Championships 2013 details	Tora Berger; Norway	44:52.5 (0+0+0+0)	Andrea Henkel; Germany	45:45.2 (0+0+0+0)	Valj Semerenko; Ukraine	46:35.0 (1+0+0+0)
Sochi details	Darya Domracheva; Belarus	45:45.2 (0+0+0+2)	Olga Zaitseva; Russia	46:19.8 (0+0+0+0)	Tora Berger; Norway	46:32.0 (0+1+0+0)

== Standings ==
#	Name	ÖST	WCH	SOC	Total
1	Tora Berger (NOR)	60	60	48	168
2	Andrea Henkel (GER)	34	54	43	131
3	Darya Domracheva (BLR)	54	8	60	122
4	Olga Zaitseva (RUS)	15	38	54	107
5	Anastasiya Kuzmina (SVK)	29	43	32	104
6	Kaisa Mäkäräinen (FIN)	32	34	38	104
7	Gabriela Soukalová (CZE)	31	29	34	94
8	Selina Gasparin (SUI)	43	21	26	90
9	Valj Semerenko (UKR)	9	48	29	86
10	Ekaterina Glazyrina (RUS)	48	36	—	84
11	Marie Dorin Habert (FRA)	22	32	30	84
12	Magdalena Gwizdon (POL)	16	23	40	79
13	Teja Gregorin (SLO)	26	16	31	73
14	Olga Vilukhina (RUS)	40	31	0	71
15	Ekaterina Yurlova (RUS)	38	9	24	71
16	Vita Semerenko (UKR)	20	40	10	70
17	Susan Dunklee (USA)	0	26	36	62
18	Krystyna Pałka (POL)	36	19	—	55
19	Olena Pidhrushna (UKR)	8	30	15	53
20	Marie Laure Brunet (FRA)	28	22	—	50
21	Juliya Dzhyma (UKR)	3	28	14	45
22	Nadezhda Skardino (BLR)	21	15	8	44
23	Weronika Nowakowska-Ziemniak (POL)	25	18	—	43
24	Miriam Gössner (GER)	30	6	6	42
25	Iris Schwabl (AUT)	—	17	22	39
26	Franziska Hildebrand (GER)	27	0	11	38
27	Veronika Vítková (CZE)	10	27	0	37
28	Liudmila Kalinchik (BLR)	24	10	3	37
29	Nadine Horchler (GER)	0	13	19	32
30	Annelies Cook (USA)	0	3	27	30
31	Mariya Panfilova (UKR)	—	—	28	28
32	Zhang Yan (CHN)	0	25	—	25
33	Sophie Boilley (FRA)	0	0	25	25
34	Andreja Mali (SLO)	0	5	20	25
35	Karin Oberhofer (ITA)	11	12	2	25
36	Rosanna Crawford (CAN)	0	24	0	24
37	Michela Ponza (ITA)	0	0	23	23
38	Marina Korovina (RUS)	23	—	—	23
39	Dorothea Wierer (ITA)	0	0	21	21
40	Éva Tófalvi (ROM)	12	0	9	21
41	Elisabeth Högberg (SWE)	0	20	0	20
42	Kadri Lehtla (EST)	19	0	—	19
43	Zina Kocher (CAN)	18	0	0	18
44	Svetlana Sleptsova (RUS)	—	—	18	18
45	Ann Kristin Flatland (NOR)	—	0	17	17
46	Diana Rasimovičiūtė (LTU)	17	0	0	17
47	Hilde Fenne (NOR)	—	0	16	16
48	Sara Studebaker (USA)	0	14	0	14
49	Marine Bolliet (FRA)	14	—	0	14
50	Anaïs Bescond (FRA)	0	0	13	13
51	Marte Olsbu (NOR)	13	—	—	13
52	Evi Sachenbacher-Stehle (GER)	—	—	12	12
53	Tang Jialin (CHN)	0	11	—	11
54	Elisa Gasparin (SUI)	0	7	0	7
55	Romana Schrempf (AUT)	0	0	7	7
56	Emelie Larsson (SWE)	7	—	—	7
57	Elin Mattsson (SWE)	6	0	0	6
58	Reka Ferencz (ROU)	5	0	0	5
59	Ane Skrove Nossum (NOR)	—	—	5	5
60	Alexia Runggaldier (ITA)	0	0	4	4
61	Niya Dimitrova (BUL)	—	4	0	4
62	Tina Bachmann (GER)	4	—	—	4
63	Laure Soulie (AND)	0	2	0	2
64	Martina Chrapanova (SVK)	2	0	0	2
65	Jana Gerekova (SVK)	1	0	0	1
66	Barbora Tomešová (CZE)	0	1	—	1
67	Victoria Padial (ESP)	0	0	1	1
