= 2012–13 Biathlon World Cup – Individual Men =

The 2012–13 Biathlon World Cup – Individual Men started at Wednesday November 28, 2012 in Östersund and will finish in Sochi. Defending titlist is Simon Fourcade of France.

== Competition format ==
The 20 kilometres (12 mi) individual race is the oldest biathlon event; the distance is skied over five laps. The biathlete shoots four times at any shooting lane, in the order of prone, standing, prone, standing, totalling 20 targets. For each missed target a fixed penalty time, usually one minute, is added to the skiing time of the biathlete. Competitors' starts are staggered, normally by 30 seconds.

== 2011-12 Top 3 Standings ==
Medal	Athlete	Points
Gold:	(France) Simon Fourcade	125
Silver:	(Slovenia) Jakov Fak	113
Bronze:	(Norway) Emil Hegle Svendsen	108

== Medal winners ==
Event:	Gold:	Time	Silver:	Time	Bronze:	Time
Östersund details	Martin Fourcade; France	50:44.7 (0+1+0+0)	Dominik Landertinger; Austria	50:57.0 (0+1+0+0)	Erik Lesser; Germany	51:06.4 (0+0+0+0)
Biathlon World Championships 2013 details	Martin Fourcade; France	49:43.0 (0+0+0+1)	Tim Burke; United States	50:06.5 (0+0+0+1)	Fredrik Lindström; Sweden	50:16.7 (0+0+0+1)
Sochi details	Martin Fourcade; France	49:40.6 (1+0+0+0)	Andreas Birnbacher; Germany	49:47.5 (0+0+0+0)	Serhiy Semenov; Ukraine	50:12.5 (0+0+0+0)

== Standings ==
#	Name	ÖST	WCH	SOC	Total
1	Martin Fourcade (FRA)	60	60	60	180
2	Andreas Birnbacher (GER)	16	34	54	104
3	Tim Burke (USA)	8	54	40	102
4	Dominik Landertinger (AUT)	54	27	19	100
5	Ondřej Moravec (CZE)	27	43	27	98
6	Björn Ferry (SWE)	2	40	36	78
7	Fredrik Lindström (SWE)	17	48	7	72
8	Lukas Hofer (ITA)	0	36	34	70
9	Henrik L'Abée-Lund (NOR)	14	32	23	69
10	Krasimir Anev (BUL)	34	4	28	66
11	Erlend Bjøntegaard (NOR)	36	—	25	61
12	Evgeny Ustyugov (RUS)	40	0	20	60
13	Erik Lesser (GER)	48	7	0	55
14	Tarjei Bø (NOR)	—	29	26	55
15	Dominik Windisch (ITA)	29	23	0	52
16	Jean-Guillaume Béatrix (FRA)	0	28	24	52
17	Arnd Peiffer (GER)	30	13	6	49
18	Serhiy Semenov (UKR)	0	—	48	48
19	Ivan Joller (SUI)	—	17	31	48
20	Alexey Volkov (RUS)	0	26	22	48
21	Dmitry Malyshko (RUS)	15	—	32	47
22	Yan Savitskiy (KAZ)	0	30	15	45
23	Andriy Deryzemlya (UKR)	0	24	21	45
24	Andrejs Rastorgujevs (LAT)	0	0	43	43
25	Emil Hegle Svendsen (NOR)	43	—	—	43
26	Anton Shipulin (RUS)	32	8	—	40
27	Jakov Fak (SLO)	0	21	18	39
28	Friedrich Pinter (AUT)	38	0	0	38
29	Simon Fourcade (FRA)	—	38	0	38
29	Benedikt Döll (GER)	—	—	38	38
31	Miroslav Matiaško (SVK)	28	9	0	37
32	Michal Šlesingr (CZE)	10	11	16	37
33	Christoph Sumann (AUT)	7	—	29	36
34	Carl Johan Bergman (SWE)	23	6	4	33
35	Ole Einar Bjørndalen (NOR)	—	16	17	33
36	Jarkko Kauppinen (FIN)	31	0	1	32
37	Alexis Bœuf (FRA)	18	14	—	32
38	Jean-Philippe Leguellec (CAN)	0	31	0	31
39	Zdeněk Vítek (CZE)	0	0	30	30
40	Simon Eder (AUT)	21	0	9	30
41	Claudio Böckli (SUI)	25	3	0	28
42	Evgeniy Garanichev (RUS)	22	—	5	27
43	Serguei Sednev (UKR)	26	0	—	26
44	Sergey Novikov (BLR)	1	25	0	26
45	Matej Kazar (SVK)	24	0	0	24
46	Scott Perras (CAN)	9	15	0	24
47	Christian De Lorenzi (ITA)	12	0	11	23
48	Benjamin Weger (SUI)	0	22	0	22
49	Lars Helge Birkeland (NOR)	20	0	—	20
50	Peter Dokl (SLO)	0	20	0	20
51	Artem Pryma (UKR)	19	0	0	19
52	Leif Nordgren (USA)	0	19	0	19
53	Tomas Kaukėnas (LTU)	0	18	0	18
54	Lowell Bailey (USA)	4	12	0	16
55	Alexey Slepov (RUS)	—	—	14	14
56	Klemen Bauer (SLO)	0	0	13	13
57	Hidenori Isa (JPN)	13	0	0	13
58	Michail Kletcherov (BUL)	0	0	12	12
59	Florian Graf (GER)	11	1	0	12
60	Pavol Hurajt (SVK)	—	0	10	10
61	Scott Gow (CAN)	—	10	0	10
62	Alexei Almoukov (AUS)	0	0	8	8
63	Simon Schempp (GER)	6	—	—	6
64	Kauri Kõiv (EST)	0	5	0	5
65	Andrei Makoveev (RUS)	5	0	—	5
66	Evgeny Abramenko (BLR)	3	—	2	5
67	Sergey Klyachin (RUS)	—	—	3	3
68	Jaroslav Soukup (CZE)	—	2	0	2
