= 2012–13 Biathlon World Cup – World Cup 2 =

The 2012–13 Biathlon World Cup – World Cup 2 was held in Hochfilzen, Austria, from 7 December until 9 December 2012.

== Schedule of events ==
Date	Time	Events
December 7	11:30 CET	Men's 10 km Sprint
December 7	14:30 CET	Women's 7.5 km Sprint
December 8	12:45 CET	Men's 12.5 km Pursuit
December 8	15:00 CET	Women's 10 km Pursuit
December 9	11:15 CET	Men's 4x7.5 km Relay
December 9	14:00 CET	Women's 4x6 km Relay

== Medal winners ==
=== Men ===
Event:	Gold:	Time	Silver:	Time	Bronze:	Tim
10 km Sprint details	Andreas Birnbacher; Germany	25:31.1 (0+0)	Martin Fourcade; France	25:31.5 (1+0)	Jakov Fak; Slovenia	25:44.8 (0+1)
12.5 km Pursuit details	Jakov Fak; Slovenia	34:14.8 (0+0+1+1)	Dmitry Malyshko; Russia	34:15.7 (0+0+0+1)	Martin Fourcade; France	34:23.4 (0+2+0+1)
4x7.5 km Relay details	Norway; Lars Helge Birkeland; Ole Einar Bjørndalen; Vetle Sjåstad Christiansen; Henrik L'Abée-Lund	1:17:55.2 (0+0) (0+0) (0+0) (0+1) (0+0) (0+0) (0+0) (0+0)	France; Vincent Jay; Jean-Guillaume Béatrix; Alexis Bœuf; Martin Fourcade	1:18:29.7 (0+0) (0+0) (0+0) (0+3) (0+1) (0+1) (0+1) (0+0)	Russia; Anton Shipulin; Andrei Makoveev; Evgeny Ustyugov; Dmitry Malyshko	1:18:41.8 (0+1) (0+0) (0+1) (0+3) (0+0) (0+0) (0+2) (0+2)

=== Women ===
Event:	Gold:	Time	Silver:	Time	Bronze:	Time
7.5 km Sprint details	Darya Domracheva; Belarus	22:24.7 (1+0)	Kaisa Mäkäräinen; Finland	22:29.4 (0+1)	Tora Berger; Norway	22:37.6 (0+1)
10 km Pursuit details	Synnøve Solemdal; Norway	31:13.4 (1+0+0+0)	Tora Berger; Norway	31:43.6 (0+1+1+0)	Kaisa Mäkäräinen; Finland	31:46.7 (0+0+2+2)
4x6 km Relay details	Norway; Fanny Welle-Strand Horn; Synnøve Solemdal; Hilde Fenne; Tora Berger	1:11:45.1 (0+0) (0+0) (0+1) (0+2) (0+1) (0+0) (0+0) (0+1)	Ukraine; Vita Semerenko; Valj Semerenko; Juliya Dzhyma; Olena Pidhrushna	1:12:15.5 (0+0) (0+1) (0+0) (0+3) (0+0) (0+0) (0+0) (0+0)	Russia; Ekaterina Glazyrina; Olga Zaitseva; Ekaterina Shumilova; Olga Vilukhina	1:12:30.5 (0+0) (0+0) (0+0) (0+0) (0+0) (0+3) (0+1) (0+0)

== Achievements ==
Best performance for all time

- Vetle Sjåstad Christiansen (NOR), 15th place in Sprint
- Scott Perras (CAN), 25th place in Sprint
- Simon Desthieux (FRA), 37th place in Sprint
- Tomaas Krupcik (CZE), 56th place in Sprint and 55th place in Pursuit
- Alexei Almoukov (AUS), 58th place in Sprint and Pursuit
- Joel Sloof (NED), 62nd place in Sprint
- Dino Butkovic (CRO), 98th place in Sprint
- Anna Karin Strömstedt (SWE), 12th place in Sprint
- Nadine Horchler (GER), 13th place in Sprint and 10th place in Pursuit
- Ekaterina Shumilova (RUS), 16th place in Sprint and 8th place in Pursuit
- Rosanna Crawford (CAN), 24th place in Sprint
- Elin Mattsson (SWE), 32nd place in Sprint
- Alexia Runggaldier (ITA), 33rd place in Sprint and 28th in Pursuit
- Martina Chrapanova (SVK), 37th place in Sprint
- Nicole Gontier (ITA), 43rd place in Sprint
- Asa Lif (SWE), 61st place in Sprint
- Paulina Fialkova (SVK), 62nd place in Sprint
- Johanna Taliharm (EST), 66th place in Sprint
- Stefani Popova (BUL), 84th place in Sprint
- Synnøve Solemdal (NOR), 1st place in Pursuit

First World Cup race

- Lenart Oblak (SLO), 97th place in Sprint
