= 2012–13 Biathlon World Cup – World Cup 6 =

Stage of Biathlon World Cup 2012-2013

The 2012–13 Biathlon World Cup – World Cup 6 was held in Antholz, Italy, from 17 January until 20 January 2013.

== Schedule of events ==
Date	Time	Events
17 January	14:30 CET	Women's 7.5 km Sprint
18 January	14:30 CET	Men's 10 km Sprint
19 January	11:45 CET	Women's 10 km Pursuit
19 January	15:15 CET	Men's 12.5 km Pursuit
20 January	10:30 CET	Women's 4x6 km Relay
20 January	14:15 CET	Men's 4x7.5 km Relay

== Medal winners ==
=== Men ===
Event:	Gold:	Time	Silver:	Time	Bronze:	Tim
10 km Sprint details	Anton Shipulin; Russia	22:45.8 (0+0)	Emil Hegle Svendsen; Norway	22:58.6 (1+0)	Jakov Fak; Slovenia	23:06.2 (0+1)
12.5 km Pursuit details	Anton Shipulin; Russia	31:24.2 (0+1+1+0)	Jakov Fak; Slovenia	31:46.8 (0+0+1+0)	Daniel Mesotitsch; Austria	31:50.0 (1+0+0+0)
4x7.5 km Relay details	France; Simon Fourcade; Jean-Guillaume Béatrix; Alexis Bœuf; Martin Fourcade	1:13:26.0 (0+0) (0+1) (0+0) (0+2) (0+0) (0+1) (0+2) (0+2)	Russia; Anton Shipulin; Evgeny Ustyugov; Evgeniy Garanichev; Dmitry Malyshko	1:13:36.1 (0+2) (0+0) (0+0) (0+3) (0+0) (0+1) (0+0) (0+2)	Austria; Simon Eder; Christoph Sumann; Daniel Mesotitsch; Dominik Landertinger	1:14:44.5 (0+0) (0+2) (0+1) (0+1) (0+0) (0+1) (0+0) (1+3)

=== Women ===
Event:	Gold:	Time	Silver:	Time	Bronze:	Time
7.5 km Sprint details	Anastasiya Kuzmina; Slovakia	20:28.6 (0+0)	Kaisa Mäkäräinen; Finland	20:45.3 (1+0)	Darya Domracheva; Belarus	20:50.5 (1+0)
10 km Pursuit details	Tora Berger; Norway	31:21.8 (0+1+1+0)	Olena Pidhrushna; Ukraine	31:40.7 (0+0+0+1)	Kaisa Mäkäräinen; Finland	31:47.2 (0+0+2+2)
4x6 km Relay details	Germany; Franziska Hildebrand; Miriam Gössner; Nadine Horchler; Andrea Henkel	1:13:02.1 (0+1) (0+1) (0+3) (0+1) (0+0) (0+0) (0+0) (0+1)	Russia; Ekaterina Glazyrina; Olga Zaitseva; Ekaterina Shumilova; Olga Vilukhina	1:13:19.5 (0+1) (0+1) (0+0) (0+1) (0+1) (0+1) (0+1) (0+3)	France; Anaïs Bescond; Sophie Boilley; Marie-Laure Brunet; Marie Dorin Habert	1:13:43.0 (0+0) (0+2) (0+0) (0+0) (0+0) (0+0) (0+0) (0+2)
