= 2012–13 Biathlon World Cup =

Biathlon competition

| Discipline | Men | Women |
| Overall | (France) Martin Fourcade | (Norway) Tora Berger |
| Nations Cup | Russia | Norway |
| Individual | (France) Martin Fourcade | (Norway) Tora Berger |
| Sprint | (France) Martin Fourcade | (Norway) Tora Berger |
| Pursuit | (France) Martin Fourcade | (Norway) Tora Berger |
| Mass start | (France) Martin Fourcade | (Norway) Tora Berger |
| Relay | Russia | Norway |
- Mixed: Norway

Competition

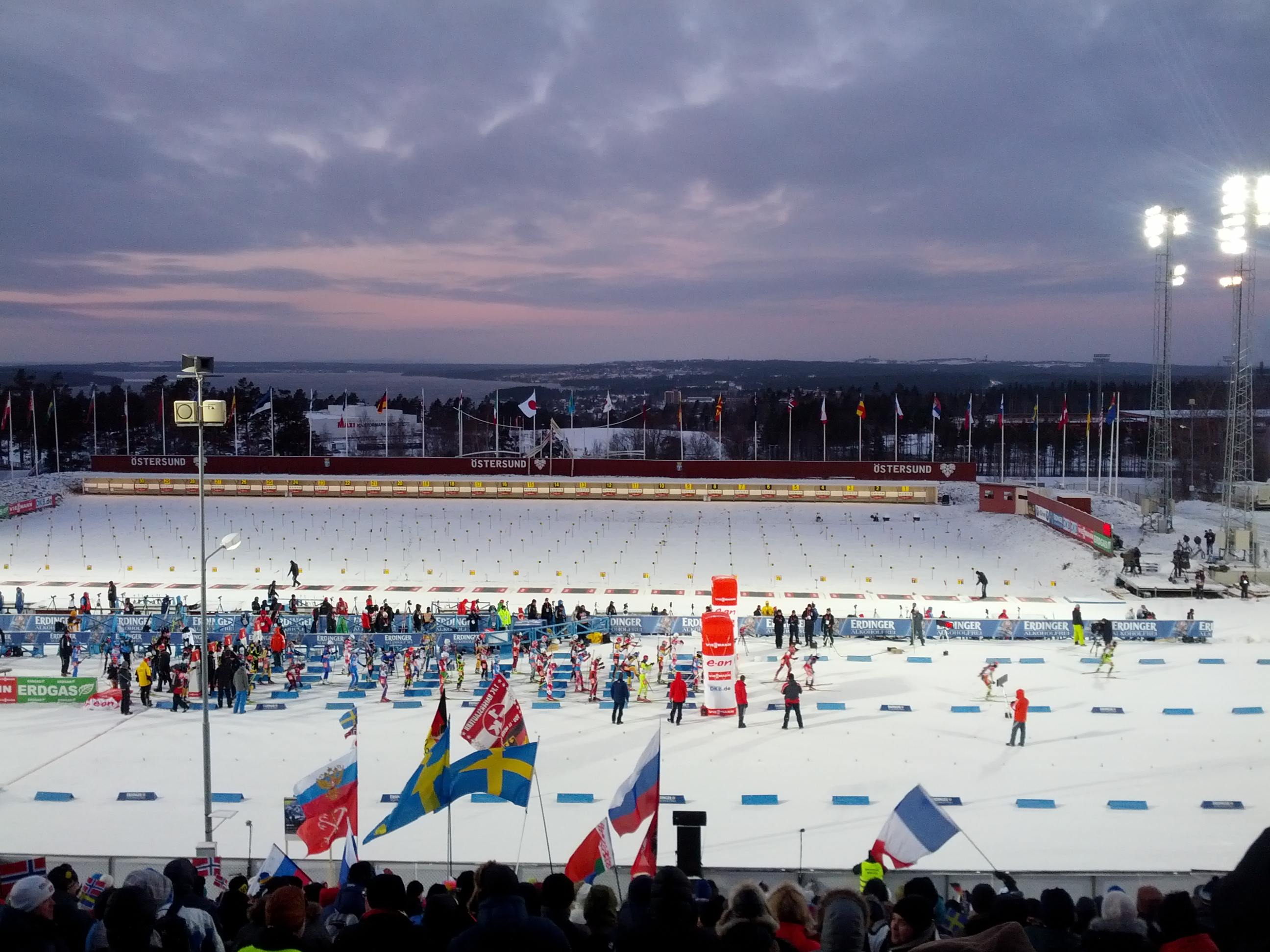
2012–13 World Cup in Östersund

The 2012–13 Biathlon World Cup was a multi-race tournament over a season of biathlon, organised by the International Biathlon Union. The season started on 25 November 2012 in Östersund, Sweden and ended on 17 March 2013 in Khanty-Mansiysk, Russia.

== Calendar ==
Below is the IBU World Cup calendar for the 2012–13 season.

| Location | Date | Individual | Sprint | Pursuit | Mass start | Relay | Mixed relay | Details |
|---|---|---|---|---|---|---|---|---|
| (Sweden) Östersund | 25 November–2 December | ● | ● | ● | | | ● | details |
| (Austria) Hochfilzen | 7–9 December | | ● | ● | | ● | | details |
| (Slovenia) Pokljuka | 13–16 December | | ● | ● | ● | | | details |
| (Germany) Oberhof | 3–6 January | | ● | ● | | ● | | details |
| (Germany) Ruhpolding | 9–13 January | | ● | | ● | ● | | details |
| (Italy) Antholz-Anterselva | 17–20 January | | ● | ● | | ● | | details |
| (Czech Republic) Nové Město | 7–17 February | ● | ● | ● | ● | ● | ● | World Championships |
| (Norway) Holmenkollen | 28 February–3 March | | ● | ● | ● | | | details |
| (Russia) Sochi | 7–10 March | ● | ● | | | ● | | details |
| (Russia) Khanty-Mansiysk | 14–17 March | | ● | ● | ● | | | details |
| Total | | 3 | 10 | 8 | 5 | 6 | 2 | |

== World Cup podiums ==
=== Men ===
| Stage | Date | Place | Discipline | Winner | Second | Third | Yellow bib (After competition) | Det. |
|---|---|---|---|---|---|---|---|---|
| 1 | 28 November 2012 | (Sweden) Östersund | 20 km Individual | (France) Martin Fourcade | (Austria) Dominik Landertinger | (Germany) Erik Lesser | (France) Martin Fourcade | Detail |
| 1 | 1 December 2012 | (Sweden) Östersund | 10 km Sprint | (Canada) Jean-Philippe Le Guellec | (France) Alexis Bœuf | (Austria) Christoph Sumann | (France) Martin Fourcade | Detail |
| 1 | 2 December 2012 | (Sweden) Östersund | 12.5 km Pursuit | (France) Martin Fourcade | (Germany) Andreas Birnbacher | (Russia) Anton Shipulin | (France) Martin Fourcade | Detail |
| 2 | 7 December 2012 | (Austria) Hochfilzen | 10 km Sprint | (Germany) Andreas Birnbacher | (France) Martin Fourcade | (Slovenia) Jakov Fak | (France) Martin Fourcade | Detail |
| 2 | 8 December 2012 | (Austria) Hochfilzen | 12.5 km Pursuit | (Slovenia) Jakov Fak | (Russia) Dmitry Malyshko | (France) Martin Fourcade | (France) Martin Fourcade | Detail |
| 3 | 13 December 2012 | (Slovenia) Pokljuka | 10 km Sprint | (Slovenia) Jakov Fak | (Norway) Emil Hegle Svendsen | (France) Martin Fourcade | (France) Martin Fourcade | Detail |
| 3 | 15 December 2012 | (Slovenia) Pokljuka | 12.5 km Pursuit | (Norway) Emil Hegle Svendsen | (Czech Republic) Ondřej Moravec | (France) Martin Fourcade | (France) Martin Fourcade | Detail |
| 3 | 16 December 2012 | (Slovenia) Pokljuka | 15 km Mass Start | (Germany) Andreas Birnbacher | (Slovenia) Jakov Fak | (United States) Tim Burke | (France) Martin Fourcade | Detail |
| 4 | 5 January 2013 | (Germany) Oberhof | 10 km Sprint | (Russia) Dmitry Malyshko | (Russia) Evgeny Garanichev | (Norway) Emil Hegle Svendsen | (France) Martin Fourcade | Detail |
| 4 | 6 January 2013 | (Germany) Oberhof | 12.5 km Pursuit | (Russia) Dmitry Malyshko | (Russia) Evgeny Garanichev | (Czech Republic) Ondřej Moravec | (France) Martin Fourcade | Detail |
| 5 | 12 January 2013 | (Germany) Ruhpolding | 10 km Sprint | (France) Martin Fourcade | (Russia) Evgeny Ustyugov | (Russia) Andrei Makoveev | (France) Martin Fourcade | Detail |
| 5 | 13 January 2013 | (Germany) Ruhpolding | 15 km Mass Start | (France) Martin Fourcade | (Russia) Dmitry Malyshko | (Norway) Emil Hegle Svendsen | (France) Martin Fourcade | Detail |
| 6 | 18 January 2013 | (Italy) Antholz-Anterselva | 10 km Sprint | (Russia) Anton Shipulin | (Norway) Emil Hegle Svendsen | (Slovenia) Jakov Fak | (France) Martin Fourcade | Detail |
| 6 | 19 January 2013 | (Italy) Antholz-Anterselva | 12.5 km Pursuit | (Russia) Anton Shipulin | (Slovenia) Jakov Fak | (Austria) Daniel Mesotitsch | (France) Martin Fourcade | Detail |
| WC | 9 February 2013 | (Czech Republic) Nové Město na M. | 10 km Sprint | (Norway) Emil Hegle Svendsen | (France) Martin Fourcade | (Slovenia) Jakov Fak | (France) Martin Fourcade | Detail |
| WC | 10 February 2013 | (Czech Republic) Nové Město na M. | 12.5 km Pursuit | (Norway) Emil Hegle Svendsen | (France) Martin Fourcade | (Russia) Anton Shipulin | (France) Martin Fourcade | Detail |
| WC | 14 February 2013 | (Czech Republic) Nové Město na M. | 20 km Individual | (France) Martin Fourcade | (United States) Tim Burke | (Sweden) Fredrik Lindström | (France) Martin Fourcade | Detail |
| WC | 17 February 2013 | (Czech Republic) Nové Město na M. | 15 km Mass Start | (Norway) Tarjei Bø | (Russia) Anton Shipulin | (Norway) Emil Hegle Svendsen | (France) Martin Fourcade | Detail |
| 7 | 28 February 2013 | (Norway) Oslo Holmenkollen | 10 km Sprint | (Norway) Tarjei Bø | (France) Martin Fourcade | (Ukraine) Andriy Deryzemlya | (France) Martin Fourcade | Detail |
| 7 | 2 March 2013 | (Norway) Oslo Holmenkollen | 12.5 km Pursuit | (France) Martin Fourcade | (Norway) Tarjei Bø | (Russia) Alexander Loginov | (France) Martin Fourcade | Detail |
| 7 | 3 March 2013 | (Norway) Oslo Holmenkollen | 15 km Mass Start | (Czech Republic) Ondřej Moravec | (France) Martin Fourcade | (Germany) Erik Lesser | (France) Martin Fourcade | Detail |
| 8 | 7 March 2013 | (Russia) Sochi | 20 km Individual | (France) Martin Fourcade | (Germany) Andreas Birnbacher | (Ukraine) Serhiy Semenov | (France) Martin Fourcade | Detail |
| 8 | 9 March 2013 | (Russia) Sochi | 10 km Sprint | (France) Martin Fourcade | (Norway) Henrik L'Abée-Lund | (Austria) Dominik Landertinger | (France) Martin Fourcade | Detail |
| 9 | 15 March 2013 | (Russia) Khanty-Mansiysk | 10 km Sprint | (France) Martin Fourcade | (Italy) Lukas Hofer | (Germany) Andreas Birnbacher | (France) Martin Fourcade | Detail |
| 9 | 16 March 2013 | (Russia) Khanty-Mansiysk | 12.5 km Pursuit | (Austria) Christoph Sumann | (France) Simon Fourcade | (France) Martin Fourcade | (France) Martin Fourcade | Detail |
| 9 | 17 March 2013 | (Russia) Khanty-Mansiysk | 15 km Mass Start | (France) Martin Fourcade | (Austria) Dominik Landertinger | (Norway) Emil Hegle Svendsen | (France) Martin Fourcade | Detail |

=== Women ===
| Stage | Date | Place | Discipline | Winner | Second | Third | Yellow bib (After competition) | Det. |
|---|---|---|---|---|---|---|---|---|
| 1 | 29 November 2012 | (Sweden) Östersund | 15 km Individual | (Norway) Tora Berger | (Belarus) Darya Domracheva | (Russia) Ekaterina Glazyrina | (Norway) Tora Berger | Detail |
| 1 | 1 December 2012 | (Sweden) Östersund | 7.5 km Sprint | (Norway) Tora Berger | (Ukraine) Olena Pidhrushna | (Russia) Olga Vilukhina | (Norway) Tora Berger | Detail |
| 1 | 2 December 2012 | (Sweden) Östersund | 10 km Pursuit | (Norway) Tora Berger | (Belarus) Darya Domracheva | (Germany) Andrea Henkel | (Norway) Tora Berger | Detail |
| 2 | 7 December 2012 | (Austria) Hochfilzen | 7.5 km Sprint | (Belarus) Darya Domracheva | (Finland) Kaisa Mäkäräinen | (Norway) Tora Berger | (Norway) Tora Berger | Detail |
| 2 | 8 December 2012 | (Austria) Hochfilzen | 10 km Pursuit | (Norway) Synnøve Solemdal | (Norway) Tora Berger | (Finland) Kaisa Mäkäräinen | (Norway) Tora Berger | Detail |
| 3 | 14 December 2012 | (Slovenia) Pokljuka | 7.5 km Sprint | (Czech Republic) Gabriela Soukalová | (Germany) Miriam Gössner | (Belarus) Nadezhda Skardino | (Norway) Tora Berger | Detail |
| 3 | 15 December 2012 | (Slovenia) Pokljuka | 10 km Pursuit | (Germany) Miriam Gössner | (Czech Republic) Gabriela Soukalová | (France) Marie Dorin Habert | (Norway) Tora Berger | Detail |
| 3 | 16 December 2012 | (Slovenia) Pokljuka | 12.5 km Mass Start | (Norway) Tora Berger | (Germany) Miriam Gössner | (Czech Republic) Gabriela Soukalová | (Norway) Tora Berger | Detail |
| 4 | 5 January 2013 | (Germany) Oberhof | 7.5 km Sprint | (Germany) Miriam Gössner | (Norway) Tora Berger | (Germany) Andrea Henkel | (Norway) Tora Berger | Detail |
| 4 | 6 January 2013 | (Germany) Oberhof | 10 km Pursuit | (Russia) Olga Zaitseva | (Czech Republic) Veronika Vítková | (Ukraine) Valentyna Semerenko | (Norway) Tora Berger | Detail |
| 5 | 11 January 2013 | (Germany) Ruhpolding | 7.5 km Sprint | (Germany) Miriam Gössner | (Belarus) Darya Domracheva | (Finland) Kaisa Mäkäräinen | (Norway) Tora Berger | Detail |
| 5 | 13 January 2013 | (Germany) Ruhpolding | 12.5 km Mass Start | (Norway) Tora Berger | (Belarus) Darya Domracheva | (Russia) Olga Zaitseva | (Norway) Tora Berger | Detail |
| 6 | 17 January 2013 | (Italy) Antholz-Anterselva | 7.5 km Sprint | (Slovakia) Anastázia Kuzminová | (Finland) Kaisa Mäkäräinen | (Belarus) Darya Domracheva | (Norway) Tora Berger | Detail |
| 6 | 19 January 2013 | (Italy) Antholz-Anterselva | 10 km Pursuit | (Norway) Tora Berger | (Ukraine) Olena Pidhrushna | (Finland) Kaisa Mäkäräinen | (Norway) Tora Berger | Detail |
| WC | 9 February 2013 | (Czech Republic) Nové Město na M. | 7.5 km Sprint | (Ukraine) Olena Pidhrushna | (Norway) Tora Berger | (Ukraine) Vita Semerenko | (Norway) Tora Berger | Detail |
| WC | 10 February 2013 | (Czech Republic) Nové Město na M. | 10 km Pursuit | (Norway) Tora Berger | (Poland) Krystyna Pałka | (Ukraine) Olena Pidhrushna | (Norway) Tora Berger | Detail |
| WC | 13 February 2013 | (Czech Republic) Nové Město na M. | 15 km Individual | (Norway) Tora Berger | (Germany) Andrea Henkel | (Ukraine) Valentyna Semerenko | (Norway) Tora Berger | Detail |
| WC | 17 February 2013 | (Czech Republic) Nové Město na M. | 12.5 km Mass Start | (Belarus) Darya Domracheva | (Norway) Tora Berger | (Poland) Monika Hojnisz | (Norway) Tora Berger | Detail |
| 7 | 1 March 2013 | (Norway) Oslo Holmenkollen | 7.5 km Sprint | (Norway) Tora Berger | (Belarus) Darya Domracheva | (Slovakia) Anastázia Kuzminová | (Norway) Tora Berger | Detail |
| 7 | 2 March 2013 | (Norway) Oslo Holmenkollen | 10 km Pursuit | (Norway) Tora Berger | (France) Marie Dorin Habert | (Slovakia) Anastázia Kuzminová | (Norway) Tora Berger | Detail |
| 7 | 3 March 2013 | (Norway) Oslo Holmenkollen | 12.5 km Mass Start | (Norway) Tora Berger | (Slovakia) Anastázia Kuzminová | (Belarus) Darya Domracheva | (Norway) Tora Berger | Detail |
| 8 | 7 March 2013 | (Russia) Sochi | 15 km Individual | (Belarus) Darya Domracheva | (Russia) Olga Zaitseva | (Norway) Tora Berger | (Norway) Tora Berger | Detail |
| 8 | 9 March 2013 | (Russia) Sochi | 7.5 km Sprint | (Poland) Magdalena Gwizdoń | (Slovakia) Anastázia Kuzminová | (Norway) Tora Berger | (Norway) Tora Berger | Detail |
| 9 | 14 March 2013 | (Russia) Khanty-Mansiysk | 7.5 km Sprint | (Czech Republic) Gabriela Soukalová | (Germany) Andrea Henkel | (Germany) Miriam Gössner | (Norway) Tora Berger | Detail |
| 9 | 16 March 2013 | (Russia) Khanty-Mansiysk | 10 km Pursuit | (Czech Republic) Gabriela Soukalová | (Russia) Olga Vilukhina | (Norway) Tora Berger | (Norway) Tora Berger | Detail |
| 9 | 17 March 2013 | (Russia) Khanty-Mansiysk | 12.5 km Mass Start | (Czech Republic) Gabriela Soukalová | (France) Marie Dorin Habert | (Finland) Kaisa Mäkäräinen | (Norway) Tora Berger | Detail |

=== Men's team ===
| Event | Date | Place | Discipline | Winner | Second | Third |
|---|---|---|---|---|---|---|
| 2 | 9 December 2012 | (Austria) Hochfilzen | 4x7.5 km Relay | Norway Lars Helge Birkeland; Ole Einar Bjørndalen; Vetle Sjastad Christiansen; Henrik L'Abée-Lund | France Vincent Jay; Jean-Guillaume Béatrix; Alexis Boeuf; Martin Fourcade | Russia Anton Shipulin; Andrei Makoveev; Evgeny Ustyugov; Dmitry Malyshko |
| 4 | 4 January 2013 | (Germany) Oberhof | 4x7.5 km Relay | Russia Alexey Volkov; Evgeniy Garanichev; Anton Shipulin; Dmitry Malyshko | Norway Henrik L'Abée-Lund; Ole Einar Bjørndalen; Erlend Bjøntegaard; Emil Hegle Svendsen | Germany Simon Schempp; Erik Lesser; Arnd Peiffer; Florian Graf |
| 5 | 10 January 2013 | (Germany) Ruhpolding | 4x7.5 km Relay | France Simon Fourcade; Jean-Guillaume Béatrix; Alexis Boeuf; Martin Fourcade | Norway Erlend Bjøntegaard; Tarjei Bø; Henrik L'Abée-Lund; Emil Hegle Svendsen | Austria Simon Eder; Friedrich Pinter; Dominik Landertinger; Christoph Sumann |
| 6 | 20 January 2013 | (Italy) Antholz-Anterselva | 4x7.5 km Relay | France Simon Fourcade; Jean-Guillaume Béatrix; Alexis Boeuf; Martin Fourcade | Russia Anton Shipulin; Evgeny Ustyugov; Evgeniy Garanichev; Dmitry Malyshko | Austria Simon Eder; Christoph Sumann; Daniel Mesotitsch; Dominik Landertinger |
| WC | 16 February 2013 | (Czech Republic) Nové Město na Moravě | 4x7.5 km Relay | Norway Ole Einar Bjørndalen; Henrik L'Abée-Lund; Tarjei Bø; Emil Hegle Svendsen | France Simon Fourcade; Jean-Guillaume Béatrix; Alexis Boeuf; Martin Fourcade | Germany Simon Schempp; Andreas Birnbacher; Arnd Peiffer; Erik Lesser |
| 8 | 10 March 2013 | (Russia) Sochi | 4x7.5 km Relay | Russia Anton Shipulin; Alexander Loginov; Dmitry Malyshko; Evgeny Ustyugov | Germany Erik Lesser; Andreas Birnbacher; Arnd Peiffer; Benedikt Doll | Czech Republic Michal Šlesingr; Jaroslav Soukup; Vít Jánov; Ondřej Moravec |

=== Women's team ===
| Event | Date | Place | Discipline | Winner | Second | Third |
|---|---|---|---|---|---|---|
| 2 | 9 December 2012 | (Austria) Hochfilzen | 4x7.5 km Relay | Norway Fanny Horn; Synnove Solemdal; Hilde Fenne; Tora Berger | Ukraine Vita Semerenko; Valj Semerenko; Yuliia Dzhima; Olena Pidhrushna | Russia Ekaterina Glazyrina; Olga Zaitseva; Ekaterina Shumilova; Olga Vilukhina |
| 4 | 3 January 2013 | (Germany) Oberhof | 4x7.5 km Relay | Ukraine Yuliia Dzhima; Valj Semerenko; Olena Pidhrushna; Vita Semerenko | France Marie-Laure Brunet; Anais Bescond; Sophie Boilley; Marie Dorin Habert | Germany Tina Bachmann; Miriam Gössner; Franziska Hildebrand; Nadine Horchler |
| 5 | 9 January 2013 | (Germany) Ruhpolding | 4x7.5 km Relay | Norway Hilde Fenne; Ann Kristin Flatland; Synnove Solemdal; Tora Berger | Russia Ekaterina Glazyrina; Olga Vilukhina; Ekaterina Shumilova; Olga Zaitseva | Czech Republic Veronika Vítková; Gabriela Soukalová; Kristýna Černá; Veronika Zvařičová |
| 6 | 20 January 2013 | (Italy) Antholz-Anterselva | 4x7.5 km Relay | Germany Franziska Hildebrand; Miriam Gössner; Nadine Horchler; Andrea Henkel | Russia Ekaterina Glazyrina; Olga Zaitseva; Ekaterina Shumilova; Olga Vilukhina | France Anais Bescond; Sophie Boilley; Marie-Laure Brunet; Marie Dorin Habert |
| WC | 15 February 2013 | (Czech Republic) Nové Město na Moravě | 4x7.5 km Relay | Norway Hilde Fenne; Ann Kristin Flatland; Synnove Solemdal; Tora Berger | Ukraine Yuliia Dzhima; Vita Semerenko; Valj Semerenko; Olena Pidhrushna | Italy Dorothea Wierer; Nicole Gontier; Michela Ponza; Karin Oberhofer |
| 8 | 10 March 2013 | (Russia) Sochi | 4x7.5 km Relay | Germany Andrea Henkel; Evi Sachenbacher-Stehle; Miriam Gössner; Laura Dahlmeier | Ukraine Yuliia Dzhima; Olena Pidhrushna; Valj Semerenko; Mariya Panfilova | Norway Hilde Fenne; Tiril Eckhoff; Ann Kristin Flatland; Tora Berger |

=== Mixed Relay ===
| Event | Date | Place | Discipline | Winner | Second | Third |
|---|---|---|---|---|---|---|
| 1 | 25 November 2012 | (Sweden) Östersund | 4x7.5 km Relay | Russia Olga Zaitseva; Olga Vilukhina; Alexey Volkov; Evgeny Ustyugov | Norway Tora Berger; Synnove Solemdal; Erlend Bjøntegaard; Emil Hegle Svendsen | Czech Republic Veronika Vítková; Gabriela Soukalová; Michal Šlesingr; Ondřej Moravec |
| WC | 7 February 2013 | (Czech Republic) Nové Město na Moravě | 4x7.5 km Relay | Norway Tora Berger; Synnove Solemdal; Tarjei Bø; Emil Hegle Svendsen | France Marie-Laure Brunet; Marie Dorin Habert; Alexis Boeuf; Martin Fourcade | Czech Republic Veronika Vítková; Gabriela Soukalová; Jaroslav Soukup; Ondřej Moravec |

== Standings: Men ==
=== Overall ===
| Pos. | | Points |
|---|---|---|
| 1. | (France) Martin Fourcade | 1248 |
| 2. | (Norway) Emil Hegle Svendsen | 827 |
| 3. | (Austria) Dominik Landertinger | 715 |
| 4. | (Slovenia) Jakov Fak | 709 |
| 5. | (Germany) Andreas Birnbacher | 691 |

- Final standings after 26 races.

=== Individual ===
| Pos. | | Points |
|---|---|---|
| 1. | (France) Martin Fourcade | 180 |
| 2. | (Germany) Andreas Birnbacher | 104 |
| 3. | (United States) Tim Burke | 102 |
| 4. | (Austria) Dominik Landertinger | 100 |
| 5. | (Czech Republic) Ondřej Moravec | 97 |

- Final standings after 3 races.

=== Sprint ===
| Pos. | | Points |
|---|---|---|
| 1. | (France) Martin Fourcade | 484 |
| 2. | (Norway) Emil Hegle Svendsen | 315 |
| 3. | (Russia) Evgeny Ustyugov | 313 |
| 4. | (Slovenia) Jakov Fak | 302 |
| 5. | (Austria) Simon Eder | 260 |

- Final standings after 10 races.

=== Pursuit ===
| Pos. | | Points |
|---|---|---|
| 1. | (France) Martin Fourcade | 388 |
| 2. | (Norway) Emil Hegle Svendsen | 287 |
| 3. | (Russia) Anton Shipulin | 247 |
| 4. | (Sweden) Fredrik Lindström | 240 |
| 5. | (Russia) Dmitry Malyshko | 231 |

- Final standings after 8 races.

=== Mass start ===
| Pos. | | Points |
|---|---|---|
| 1. | (France) Martin Fourcade | 248 |
| 2. | (Norway) Emil Hegle Svendsen | 182 |
| 3. | (United States) Tim Burke | 167 |
| 4. | (Germany) Andreas Birnbacher | 163 |
| 5. | (Czech Republic) Ondřej Moravec | 162 |

- Final standings after 5 races.

=== Relay ===
| Pos. | | Points |
|---|---|---|
| 1. | Russia | 305 |
| 2. | Norway | 302 |
| 3. | France | 296 |
| 4. | Germany | 267 |
| 5. | Austria | 243 |

- Final standings after 6 races.

=== Nation ===
| Pos. | | Points |
|---|---|---|
| 1. | Russia | 7749 |
| 2. | Norway | 7692 |
| 3. | France | 7656 |
| 4. | Germany | 7227 |
| 5. | Austria | 6905 |

- Final standings after 21 races.

== Standings: Women ==
=== Overall ===
| Pos. | | Points |
|---|---|---|
| 1. | (Norway) Tora Berger | 1234 |
| 2. | (Belarus) Darya Domracheva | 924 |
| 3. | (Germany) Andrea Henkel | 856 |
| 4. | (France) Marie Dorin Habert | 843 |
| 5. | (Finland) Kaisa Mäkäräinen | 834 |

- Final standings after 26 races.

=== Individual ===
| Pos. | | Points |
|---|---|---|
| 1. | (Norway) Tora Berger | 168 |
| 2. | (Germany) Andrea Henkel | 131 |
| 3. | (Belarus) Darya Domracheva | 122 |
| 4. | (Russia) Olga Zaitseva | 107 |
| 5. | (Slovakia) Anastasiya Kuzmina | 104 |

- Final standings after 3 races.

=== Sprint ===
| Pos. | | Points |
|---|---|---|
| 1. | (Norway) Tora Berger | 428 |
| 2. | (Belarus) Darya Domracheva | 351 |
| 3. | (Germany) Miriam Gössner | 337 |
| 4. | (France) Marie Dorin Habert | 325 |
| 5. | (Finland) Kaisa Mäkäräinen | 324 |

- Final standings after 10 races.

=== Pursuit ===
| Pos. | | Points |
|---|---|---|
| 1. | (Norway) Tora Berger | 417 |
| 2. | (Germany) Andrea Henkel | 279 |
| 3. | (France) Marie Dorin Habert | 277 |
| 4. | (Ukraine) Olena Pidhrushna | 265 |
| 5. | (Finland) Kaisa Mäkäräinen | 255 |

- Final standings after 8 races.

=== Mass start ===
| Pos. | | Points |
|---|---|---|
| 1. | (Norway) Tora Berger | 262 |
| 2. | (Belarus) Darya Domracheva | 200 |
| 3. | (Ukraine) Vita Semerenko | 185 |
| 4. | (France) Marie Dorin Habert | 175 |
| 5. | (Finland) Kaisa Mäkäräinen | 171 |

- Final standings after 5 races.

=== Relay ===
| Pos. | | Points |
|---|---|---|
| 1. | Norway | 314 |
| 2. | Ukraine | 298 |
| 3. | Germany | 294 |
| 4. | Russia | 277 |
| 5. | France | 258 |

- Final standings after 6 races.

=== Nation ===
| Pos. | | Points |
|---|---|---|
| 1. | Norway | 7626 |
| 2. | Germany | 7556 |
| 3. | Russia | 7392 |
| 4. | Ukraine | 7386 |
| 5. | France | 7058 |

- Final standings after 21 races.

== Standings: Mixed ==
=== Mixed Relay ===
| Pos. | | Points |
|---|---|---|
| 1. | Norway | 114 |
| 2. | Russia | 98 |
| 3. | Czech Republic | 96 |
| 4. | France | 94 |
| 5. | Italy | 79 |

- Final standings after 2 races.

== Medal table ==
| Rank | Nation | Gold | Silver | Bronze | Total |
|---|---|---|---|---|---|
| 1 | Norway | 22 | 9 | 10 | 41 |
| 2 | France | 12 | 12 | 6 | 30 |
| 3 | Russia | 7 | 12 | 9 | 28 |
| 4 | Germany | 7 | 7 | 9 | 23 |
| 5 | Czech Republic | 5 | 3 | 5 | 13 |
| 6 | Belarus | 3 | 5 | 3 | 11 |
| 7 | Ukraine | 2 | 5 | 6 | 13 |
| 8 | Slovenia | 2 | 2 | 3 | 7 |
| 9 | Austria | 1 | 2 | 4 | 7 |
| 10 | Slovakia | 1 | 2 | 2 | 5 |
| 11 | Poland | 1 | 1 | 1 | 3 |
| 12 | Canada | 1 | 0 | 0 | 1 |
| 13 | Finland | 0 | 2 | 4 | 6 |
| 14 | Italy | 0 | 1 | 1 | 2 |
| 14 | United States | 0 | 1 | 1 | 2 |
| 16 | Sweden | 0 | 0 | 1 | 1 |
| Totals (16 entries) | | 64 | 64 | 65 | 193 |

== Achievements ==
First World Cup career victory

- Jean-Philippe Leguellec (CAN), 27, in his 6th season — the WC 1 Sprint in Östersund; it also was his first podium and the first podium for a Canadian male biathlete
- Synnøve Solemdal (NOR), 23, in her 5th season — the WC 2 Pursuit in Hochfilzen; it also was her first podium
- Gabriela Soukalová (CZE), 23, in her 4th season — the WC 3 Sprint in Pokljuka; it also was her first podium
- Miriam Gössner (GER), 22, in her 3rd season — the WC 3 Pursuit in Pokljuka; first podium was 2010-11 Sprint in Östersund
- Dmitry Malyshko (RUS), 25, in his 2nd season — the WC 4 Sprint in Oberhof; first podium was 2011-12 Pursuit in Kontiolahti
- Olena Pidhrushna (UKR), 26, in her 7th season — the World Championships Sprint in Nové Město; first podium was 2012-13 Sprint in Östersund
- Ondřej Moravec (CZE), 28, in his 9th season — the WC 7 Mass start in Holmenkollen; first podium was 2012-13 Pursuit in Pokljuka

First World Cup podium

- Erik Lesser (GER), 24, in his 4th season — no. 3 in the WC 1 Individual in Östersund
- Ekaterina Glazyrina (RUS), 25, in her 3rd season — no. 3 in the WC 1 Individual in Östersund
- Olena Pidhrushna (UKR), 25, in her 7th season — no. 2 in the WC 1 Sprint in Östersund
- Nadezhda Skardino (BLR), 27, in her 7th season — no. 3 in the WC 3 Sprint in Pokljuka
- Ondřej Moravec (CZE), 28, in his 9th season — no. 2 in the WC 3 Pursuit in Pokljuka
- Veronika Vítková (CZE), 24, in her 7th season — no. 2 in the WC 4 Pursuit in Oberhof
- Krystyna Pałka (POL), 29, in her 8th season — no. 2 in the World Championships Pursuit in Nové Město
- Monika Hojnisz (POL), 21, in her 3rd season — no. 3 in the World Championships Mass start in Nové Město
- Alexander Loginov (RUS), 21, in his 1st season — no. 3 in the WC 7 Pursuit in Holmenkollen
- Serhiy Semenov (UKR), 24, in his 4th season — no. 3 in the WC 8 Individual in Sochi
- Henrik L'Abée-Lund (NOR), 26, in his 3rd season — no. 3 in the WC 8 Sprint in Sochi

Victory in this World Cup (all-time number of victories in parentheses)

Men

- Martin Fourcade (FRA), 10 (24) first places
- Emil Hegle Svendsen (NOR), 3 (31) first places
- Tarjei Bø (NOR), 2 (8) first places
- Andreas Birnbacher (GER), 2 (6) first places
- Anton Shipulin (RUS), 2 (4) first places
- Jakov Fak (SLO), 2 (3) first places
- Dmitry Malyshko (RUS), 2 (2) first places
- Christoph Sumann (AUT), 1 (6) first place
- Jean-Philippe Leguellec (CAN), 1 (1) first place
- Ondřej Moravec (CZE), 1 (1) first place

Women

- Tora Berger (NOR), 11 (27) first places
- Gabriela Soukalová (CZE), 4 (4) first places
- Darya Domracheva (BLR), 3 (12) first places
- Miriam Gössner (GER), 3 (3) first places
- Olga Zaitseva (RUS), 1 (13) first place
- Anastasiya Kuzmina (SVK), 1 (4) first place
- Magdalena Gwizdoń (POL), 1 (2) first place
- Synnøve Solemdal (NOR), 1 (1) first place
- Olena Pidhrushna (UKR), 1 (1) first place

== Retirements ==
Following are notable biathletes who announced their retirement:

- Nija Dimitrova (BGR)
- Michael Greis (GER)
- Vincent Jay (FRA)
- Laure Bosc (FRA)
- Pauline Macabies (FRA)
- Julianne Döll (GER)
- Carolin Hennecke (GER)
- Kim Seo-ra (KOR)
- Aleksandra Alikina (RUS)
- Evgenyia Sedova (RUS)
- Natalia Sorokina (RUS)
- Anastasia Tokareva (RUS)
- Dijana Ravnikar (SLO)
- Lubomira Kalinova (SVK)
- Tatiana Bielkina (UKR)
