= Milanko Petrović =

Serbian biathlete

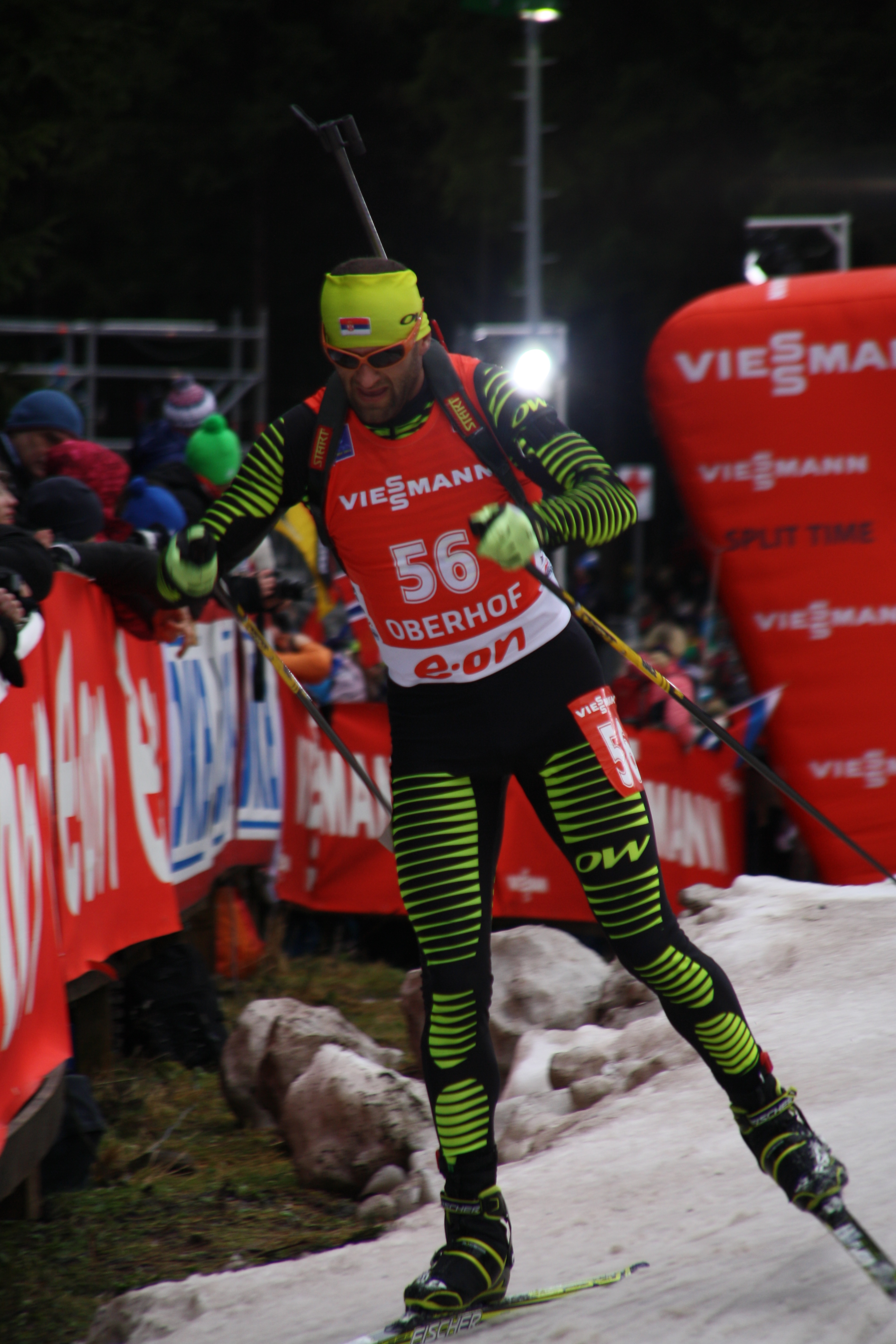

Personal information
- Full name: Milanko Petrović
- Born: 21 September 1988 (age 37) Sjenica, SFR Yugoslavia
- Height: 1.88 m (6 ft 2 in)

Sport
- Sport: Skiing
- Club: BK Lavina

World Cup career
- Seasons: 2007–
- Indiv. podiums: 0
- Indiv. wins: 0

Achievements and titles
- Personal bests: 2014 European Championship – 8th place in sprint 2013 Summer Biathlon World Championship – 5th place in pursuit
Medal record
Representing Serbia
Men's biathlon
Universiade
Gold medal – first place	2013 Trentino	10 km sprint
Bronze medal – third place	2013 Trentino	20 km individual
Men's cross-country skiing
Universiade
Gold medal – first place	2013 Trentino	10 km freestyle

Milanko Petrović (Serbian Cyrillic: Миланко Петровић; born 21 September 1988 in Sjenica) is a Serbian biathlete who participated at the 2010 Winter Olympics, becoming the first olympic biathlete for independent Serbia. At the 2014 Winter Olympics he carried Serbian flag at the opening ceremony and competed in biathlon and cross-country skiing. He represents Serbia at the Biathlon World Championships and he is a regular participant of the Biathlon World Cup and the first ever Serb to win World Cup points. Occasionally, he competes in cross-country skiing. At the 2013 Winter Universiade he made a remarkable success by winning first ever international medals for Serbia in biathlon and cross-country skiing.

== Biathlon ==
Petrović competed 5 times at the Biathlon World Championships. His best achievements were 47th place in Pursuit and 49th place in Sprint achieved in 2013. The best finish in Individual was 87th place in 2011.

Milanko Petrović competed at the 2013 Summer Biathlon World Championship. He came 5th in pursuit and 9th in Sprint.

At the 2012 European Biathlon Championship, he finished 9th in sprint and 20th in Individual. In 2014 he won 8th place in sprint, 14th place in individual race and 15th in pursuit.

The biggest successes in his career so far, Petrović achieved in 2012/13 season of World Cup. At the 4th stage of World Cup in German, Oberhof, he finished 39th in 10 km Sprint and 40th in 12.5 km Pursuit. Those were his The best world cup results which brought him first world cup points. Petrović finished 35th in Pursuit in Oslo, during the 7th stage of World Cup and won new points. He finished 47th in Sochi in the 20 km Individual and 35th in 10 km Sprint, achieved the highest Individual and Sprint World Cup placements and also won new sprint points. Petrović finished 2012/13 season on 86th place overall scoring 15 points, in sprint he came 80th with 8 points and in pursuit he was ranked 72nd with 7 points.

=== Olympic Games ===
Year	Place	Individual	Sprint	Pursuit	Mass start	Relay
2010	(Canada) Vancouver	87	81	-	-	-
2014	(Russia) Sochi	69	69	-	-	-

=== World Championships ===
Year	Place	Individual	Sprint	Pursuit	Mass start	Relay	Mixed relay
2008	(Sweden) Östersund	102	112	–	–	24	–
2009	(South Korea) Pyeongchang	105	111	–	–	26	–
2011	(Russia) Khanty-Mansiysk	87	81	–	–	LPD	–
2012	(Germany) Ruhpolding	112	65	–	–	LPD	–
2013	(Czech Republic) Nové Město	88	49	47	–	LPD	–

=== World Cup ===
Season	Individual		Sprint		Pursuit		Mass Start		Overall	
Season	Points	Position	Points	Position	Points	Position	Points	Position	Points	Position
2012–13	—	—	8	80th	7	72nd	—	—	15	86th
2013–14	6	52nd	10	8th	-	-	-	-	16	86th

== Cross-country skiing ==
Petrović competes for Serbian in cross-country skiing in Balkan Cup. He brought Serbia first ever wins in Balkan Cup in 10 km and 15 km Freestyle during the 2013 stage, held in Pale, Bosnia and Herzegovina. In 2013 he finished 8th in 10 km freestyle during the Austria Cup in Seefeld. At the 2013 Winter Universiade held in Trentino, Italy, Petrović won first ever international Serbian cross-country medal, gold in 10 km freestyle and achieved the best ever Serbian points 18.48 therefore Serbia managed to qualify for the first time two male athletes for the Olympic Games in cross-country skiing.

Olympic Games
Preceded by Jelena Lolović	Flagbearer for Serbia; 2014 Sochi	Succeeded by Nevena Ignjatović
