= 2012–13 Biathlon World Cup – World Cup 1 =

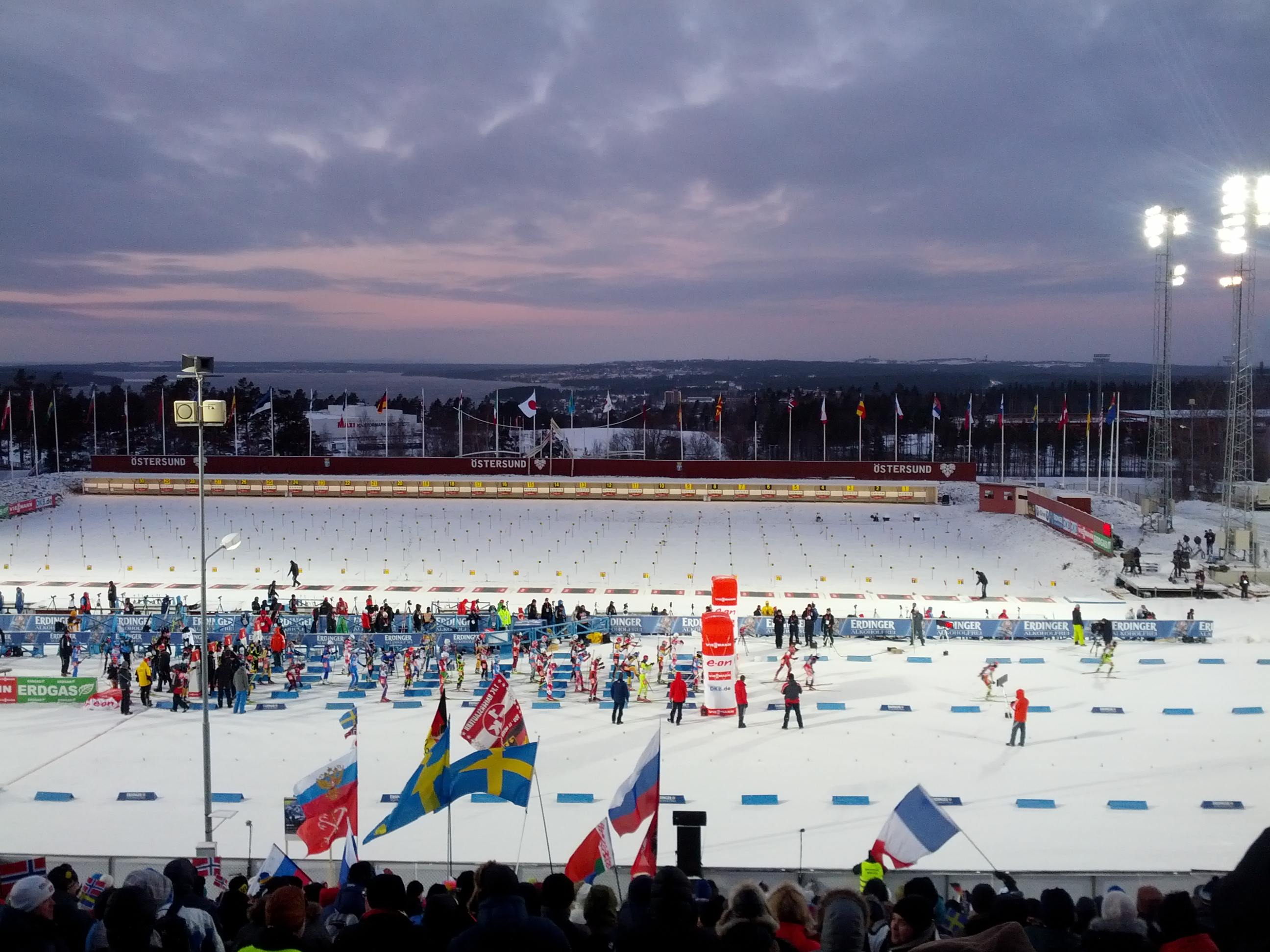
World cup in Östersund 2012-12-02

The 2012–13 Biathlon World Cup – World Cup 1 is the opening event of the season and is held in Östersund, Sweden, from 25 November until 2 December 2012.

== Schedule of events ==
Date	Time	Events
November 25	15:30 CET	Mixed Relay
November 28	17:30 CET	Men's 20 km Individual
November 29	17:30 CET	Women's 15 km Individual
December 1	13:30 CET	Men's 10 km Sprint
December 1	16:30 CET	Women's 7.5 km Sprint
December 2	12:30 CET	Men's 12.5 km Pursuit
December 2	14:30 CET	Women's 10 km Pursuit

== Medal winners ==
=== Men ===
Event:	Gold:	Time	Silver:	Time	Bronze:	Time
20 km Individual details	Martin Fourcade; France	50:44.7 (0+1+0+0)	Dominik Landertinger; Austria	50:57.0 (0+1+0+0)	Erik Lesser; Germany	51:06.4 (0+0+0+0)
10 km Sprint details	Jean-Philippe Leguellec; Canada	25:10.4 (0+0)	Alexis Bœuf; France	25:28.5 (0+1)	Christoph Sumann; Austria	25:35.2 (0+1)
12.5 km Pursuit details	Martin Fourcade; France	33:03.5 (0+0+1+0)	Andreas Birnbacher; Germany	33:04.2 (0+0+1+0)	Anton Shipulin; Russia	33:06.8 (0+0+1+0)

=== Women ===
Event:	Gold:	Time	Silver:	Time	Bronze:	Time
15 km Individual details	Tora Berger; Norway	44:33.5 (0+0+0+0)	Darya Domracheva; Belarus	45:36.7 (1+0+0+1)	Ekaterina Glazyrina; Russia	46:43.7 (0+0+0+0)
7.5 km Sprint details	Tora Berger; Norway	21:34.0 (0+1)	Olena Pidhrushna; Ukraine	21:50.9 (0+1)	Olga Vilukhina; Russia	21:53.4 (0+1)
10 km Pursuit details	Tora Berger; Norway	31:01.9 (0+0+0+1)	Darya Domracheva; Belarus	31:31.7 (0+0+1+0)	Andrea Henkel; Germany	31:53.4 (0+0+0+0)

=== Mixed ===
Event:	Gold:	Time	Silver:	Time	Bronze:	Time
2 x 6 km + 2 x 7.5 km Relay details	Russia; Olga Zaitseva; Olga Vilukhina; Alexey Volkov; Evgeny Ustyugov	1:12:41.3 (0+0) (0+2) (0+1) (0+1) (0+1) (0+1) (0+0) (0+0)	Norway; Tora Berger; Synnøve Solemdal; Erlend Bjøntegaard; Emil Hegle Svendsen	1:13:02.5 (0+0) (0+1) (0+2) (0+1) (0+1) (0+3) (0+0) (0+2)	Czech Republic; Veronika Vítková; Gabriela Soukalová; Michal Šlesingr; Ondřej Moravec	1:13:17.7 (0+2) (0+1) (0+0) (0+2) (0+1) (0+1) (0+0) (0+1)

== Achievements ==
Best performance for all time

- Erik Lesser (GER), 3rd place in Individual
- Krasimir Anev (BUL), 8th place in Individual
- Jarkko Kauppinen (FIN), 10th place in Individual
- Dominik Windisch (ITA), 12th place in Individual
- Lars Helge Birkeland (NOR), 21st place in Individual
- Arturs Kolesnikovs (LAT), 80th place in Individual
- Emir Hrkalovic (SRB), 102nd place in Individual and 96th in Sprint
- Dejan Krsmanovic (SRB), 103rd place in Individual and Sprint
- Jean-Philippe Leguellec (CAN), 1st place in Sprint
- Florian Graf (GER), 4th place in Sprint
- Henrik L'Abée-Lund (NOR), 5th place in Sprint
- Christoffer Eriksson (SWE), 26th place in Sprint
- Ahti Toivanen (FIN), 33rd place in Sprint
- Danil Steptsenko (EST), 38th place in Sprint
- Pietro Dutto (ITA), 39th place in Sprint
- Tomáš Hasilla (SVK), 47th place in Sprint
- Vetle Sjåstad Christiansen (NOR), 23rd place in Pursuit
- Tobias Arwidson (SWE), 34th place in Pursuit
- Ekaterina Glazyrina (RUS), 3rd place in Individual
- Selina Gasparin (SUI), 4th place in Individual
- Gabriela Soukalová (CZE), 10th place in Individual
- Marina Korovina (RUS), 18th place in Individual and 12th in Sprint
- Elin Mattsson (SWE), 35th place in Individual
- Martina Chrapanova (SVK), 39th place in Individual
- Yan Zhang (CHN), 42nd place in Individual
- Alexia Runggalaldier (ITA), 51st place in Individual and 42nd in Sprint
- Zanna Juskane (LAT), 56th place in Individual
- Jaqueline Mourão (BRA), 87th place in Individual
- Olena Pidhrushna (UKR), 2nd place in Sprint
- Jana Gerekova (SVK), 6th place in Sprint
- Juliya Dzhyma (UKR), 13th place in Sprint
- Nadine Horchler (GER), 22nd place in Sprint
- Yuki Nakajima (JPN), 31st place in Sprint
- Nicole Gontier (ITA), 59th place in Sprint and 49th in Pursuit
- Alina Raikova (KAZ), 66th place in Sprint
- Paulina Fialkova (SVK), 76th place in Sprint
- Stefani Popova (BUL), 91st place in Sprint
- Hilde Fenne (NOR), 28th place in Pursuit

First World Cup race

- Erlend Bjøntegaard (NOR), 7th place in Individual
- Pietro Dutto (ITA), 42nd place in Individual
- Simon Desthieux (FRA), 50th place in Individual
- Tomaas Krupcik (CZE), 85th place in Individual
- Tomáš Hasilla (SVK), 88th place in Individual
- Vetle Sjåstad Christiansen (NOR), 27th place in Sprint
- Marte Olsbu (NOR), 28th place in Individual
- Terézia Poliaková (SVK), 63rd place in Individual
- Alina Raikova (KAZ), 71st place in Individual
- Miki Kobayashi (JPN), 91st place in Individual
- Stefani Popova (BUL), 100th place in Individual
- Hilde Fenne (NOR), 30th place in Sprint
- Åsa Lif (SWE), 88th place in Sprint
- Johanna Taliharm (EST), 92nd place in Sprint
