= 2012–13 Biathlon World Cup – World Cup 5 =

Stage of a series of international competitions in biathlon 2012-2013

The 2012–13 Biathlon World Cup – World Cup 5 was held in Ruhpolding, Germany, from 9 January until 13 January 2013.

== Schedule of events ==
Date	Time	Events
January 9	18:15 CET	Women's 4x6 km Relay
January 10	18:15 CET	Men's 4x7.5 km Relay
January 11	18:15 CET	Women's 7.5 km Sprint
January 12	18:15 CET	Men's 10 km Sprint
January 13	13:00 CET	Women's 12.5 km Mass Start
January 13	15:30 CET	Men's 15 km Mass Start

== Medal winners ==
=== Men ===
Event:	Gold:	Time	Silver:	Time	Bronze:	Time
10 km Sprint details	Martin Fourcade; France	23:51.5 (0+0)	Evgeny Ustyugov; Russia	24:07.9 (0+0)	Andrei Makoveev; Russia	24:24.5 (0+0)
15 km Mass Start details	Martin Fourcade; France	36:27.7 (0+0+0+0)	Dmitry Malyshko; Russia	36:28.2 (1+0+0+0)	Emil Hegle Svendsen; Norway	36:38.3 (0+1+1+0)
4x7.5 km Relay details	France; Simon Fourcade; Jean-Guillaume Béatrix; Alexis Bœuf; Martin Fourcade	1:13:11.2 (0+0) (0+0) (0+1) (0+1) (0+0) (0+1) (0+0) (0+0)	Norway; Lars Helge Birkeland; Tarjei Bø; Henrik L'Abée-Lund; Emil Hegle Svendsen	1:13:20.6 (0+0) (0+0) (0+0) (0+3) (0+1) (0+0) (0+1) (0+3)	Austria; Simon Eder; Friedrich Pinter; Dominik Landertinger; Christoph Sumann	1:13:20.9 (0+0) (0+2) (0+2) (0+1) (0+0) (0+1) (0+3) (0+0)

=== Women ===
Event:	Gold:	Time	Silver:	Time	Bronze:	Time
7.5 km Sprint details	Miriam Gössner; Germany	20:57.2 (0+1)	Darya Domracheva; Belarus	21:04.3 (0+1)	Kaisa Mäkäräinen; Finland	21:14.7 (1+0)
12.5 km Mass Start details	Tora Berger; Norway	37:14.4 (0+0+1+0)	Darya Domracheva; Belarus	37:41.1 (1+0+1+0)	Olga Zaitseva; Russia	37:52.2 (0+0+0+1)
4x6 km Relay details	Norway; Hilde Fenne; Ann Kristin Flatland; Synnøve Solemdal; Tora Berger	1:08:13.2 (0+0) (0+2) (0+0) (0+1) (0+1) (0+0) (0+0) (0+0)	Russia; Ekaterina Glazyrina; Olga Vilukhina; Ekaterina Shumilova; Olga Zaitseva	1:09:07.9 (0+0) (0+0) (0+0) (0+0) (0+0) (0+1) (0+0) (0+0)	Czech Republic; Veronika Vítková; Gabriela Soukalová; Kristýna Černá; Veronika Zvařičová	1:10:05.0 (0+2) (0+0) (0+1) (0+1) (0+0) (0+1) (0+0) (0+2)
