= 2012–13 Biathlon World Cup – World Cup 4 =

Event held in Oberhof, Germany

The 2012–13 Biathlon World Cup – World Cup 4 was held in Oberhof, Germany, from 3 January until 6 January 2013.

== Schedule of events ==
Date	Time	Events
January 3	17:30 CET	Women's 4x6 km Relay
January 4	17:30 CET	Men's 4x7.5 km Relay
January 5	14:30 CET	Women's 7.5 km Sprint
January 5	17:30 CET	Men's 10 km Sprint
January 6	13:10 CET	Women's 10 km Pursuit
January 6	15:35 CET	Men's 12.5 km Pursuit

== Medal winners ==
=== Men ===
Event:	Gold:	Time	Silver:	Time	Bronze:	Tim
10 km Sprint details	Dmitry Malyshko; Russia	25:07.9 (1+0)	Evgeniy Garanichev; Russia	25:20.5 (1+0)	Emil Hegle Svendsen; Norway	25:21.0 (0+1)
12.5 km Pursuit details	Dmitry Malyshko; Russia	32:22.9 (0+0+0+0)	Evgeniy Garanichev; Russia	33:05.0 (0+0+0+1)	Ondřej Moravec; Czech Republic	33:12.8 (0+0+0+0)
4x7.5 km Relay details	Russia; Alexey Volkov; Evgeniy Garanichev; Anton Shipulin; Dmitry Malyshko	1:20:35.7 (0+2) (0+1) (0+0) (0+3) (0+1) (0+2) (0+2) (0+1)	Norway; Henrik L'Abée-Lund; Ole Einar Bjørndalen; Erlend Bjøntegaard; Emil Hegle Svendsen	1:20:44.1 (0+0) (1+3) (0+0) (0+0) (0+1) (0+1) (0+0) (0+3)	Germany; Simon Schempp; Erik Lesser; Arnd Peiffer; Florian Graf	1:21:15.0 (1+3) (0+0) (0+0) (0+0) (0+3) (0+1) (0+2) (0+0)

=== Women ===
Event:	Gold:	Time	Silver:	Time	Bronze:	Time
7.5 km Sprint details	Miriam Gössner; Germany	21:17.2 (0+2)	Tora Berger; Norway	21:19.2 (0+0)	Andrea Henkel; Germany	21:41.3 (0+0)
10 km Pursuit details	Olga Zaitseva; Russia	32:01.9 (0+2+1+0)	Veronika Vítková; Czech Republic	32:27.8 (1+0+0+0)	Valj Semerenko; Ukraine	32:30.3 (0+1+0+0)
4x6 km Relay details	Ukraine; Juliya Dzhyma; Valj Semerenko; Olena Pidhrushna; Vita Semerenko	1:20:16.1 (0+0) (0+1) (0+1) (0+1) (0+0) (0+1) (0+0) (0+1)	France; Marie-Laure Brunet; Anaïs Bescond; Sophie Boilley; Marie Dorin Habert	1:21:02.0 (0+0) (0+2) (0+0) (0+0) (0+1) (0+1) (0+0) (0+0)	Germany; Tina Bachmann; Miriam Gössner; Franziska Hildebrand; Nadine Horchler	1:22:03.4 (0+0) (0+0) (0+0) (2+3) (0+1) (0+1) (0+1) (0+2)

== Achievements ==
Best performance for all time

- Dmitry Malyshko (RUS), 1st place in Sprint
- Julian Eberhard (AUT), 8th place in Sprint
- Simon Desthieux (FRA), 19th place in Sprint
- Milanko Petrovic (SRB), 39th place in Sprint
- Arturs Kolesnikovs (LAT), 66th place in Sprint
- Mikito Tachizaki (JPN), 75th place in Sprint
- Ivan Zlatev (BUL), 79th place in Sprint
- Remus Faur (ROU), 83rd place in Sprint
- Rafal Lepel (POL), 92nd place in Sprint
- Emir Hrkalovic (SRB), 93rd place in Sprint
- Milan Szabo (HUN), 95th place in Sprint
- Juliya Dzhyma (UKR), 6th place in Sprint
- Nadine Horchler (GER), 9th place in Sprint
- Karin Oberhofer (ITA), 11th place in Sprint
- Monika Hojnisz (POL), 19th place in Sprint
- Nicole Gontier (ITA), 25th place in Sprint
- Iris Schwabl (AUT), 26th place in Sprint
- Iryna Kryuko (BLR), 34th place in Sprint
- Natalija Kocergina (LTU), 35th place in Sprint
- Victoria Padial (ESP), 44th place in Sprint
- Grete Gaim (EST), 46th place in Sprint
- Johanna Taliharm (EST), 51st place in Sprint
- Patricia Jost (SUI), 71st place in Sprint
- Veronika Vítková (CZE), 2nd place in Pursuit
- Yan Zhang (CHN), 18th place in Pursuit
- Alina Raikova (KAZ), 51st place in Pursuit

First World Cup race

- Kalev Ermits (EST), 87th place in Sprint
- Lukasz Slonina (POL), 90th place in Sprint
- Scott Dixon (GBR), 96th place in Sprint
- Kristyna Cerna (CZE), 73rd place in Sprint
- Diana Marian Salman (ROU), 81st place in Sprint
- Ji-Ae Park (KOR), 46th place in Sprint
