= 2012–13 Biathlon World Cup – World Cup 9 =

The 2012–13 Biathlon World Cup – World Cup 9 was held in Khanty-Mansiysk, Russia, from 14 March until 17 March 2013.

== Schedule of events ==
Date	Time	Events
March 14	13:15 CET	Women's 7.5 km Sprint
March 15	13:00 CET	Men's 10 km Sprint
March 16	11:30 CET	Women's 10 km Pursuit
March 16	13:30 CET	Men's 12.5 km Pursuit
March 17	10:30 CET	Women's 12.5 km Mass Start
March 17	13:30 CET	Men's 15 km Mass Start

== Medal winners ==
=== Men ===
Event:	Gold:	Time	Silver:	Time	Bronze:	Tim
10 km Sprint details	Martin Fourcade; France	24:22.6 (0+0)	Lukas Hofer; Italy	25:02.2 (0+0)	Andreas Birnbacher; Germany	25:06.4 (0+0)
12.5 km Pursuit details	Christoph Sumann; Austria	34:47.9 (0+0+0+0)	Simon Fourcade; France	35:23.6 (0+0+0+0)	Martin Fourcade; France	35:28.3 (1+1+2+1)
12.5 km Pursuit details	Christoph Sumann; Austria	34:47.9 (0+0+0+0)	Simon Fourcade; France	35:23.6 (0+0+0+0)	Michal Šlesingr; Czech Republic	35:28.3 (0+0+1+2)
15 km Mass Start details	Martin Fourcade; France	41:51.4 (0+1+0+0)	Dominik Landertinger; Austria	42:05.3 (0+0+1+0)	Emil Hegle Svendsen; Norway	42:08.7 (0+0+1+0)

=== Women ===
Event:	Gold:	Time	Silver:	Time	Bronze:	Time
7.5 km Sprint details	Gabriela Soukalová; Czech Republic	21:25.6 (0+0)	Andrea Henkel; Germany	21:42.8 (0+0)	Miriam Gössner; Germany	21:49.2 (0+1)
10 km Pursuit details	Gabriela Soukalová; Czech Republic	30:58.8 (0+1+0+1)	Olga Vilukhina; Russia	31:05.8 (0+1+2+0)	Tora Berger; Norway	31:13.6 (1+0+0+1)
12.5 km Mass Start details	Gabriela Soukalová; Czech Republic	38:22.4 (0+0+0+0)	Marie Dorin Habert; France	38:33.6 (0+0+1+0)	Kaisa Mäkäräinen; Finland	38:45.3 (0+0+1+1)

== Achievements ==
Best performance for all time

- Lukas Hofer (ITA), 2nd place in Sprint
- Vetle Sjåstad Christiansen (NOR), 10th place in Sprint
- Olga Vilukhina (RUS), 2nd place in Pursuit
- Darya Usanova (KAZ), 17th place in Sprint
- Olga Podchufarova (RUS), 30th place in Sprint
- Desislava Stoyanova (BUL), 62nd place in Sprint
