= Alexei Almoukov =

Australian biathlete (born 1990)

Alex Almoukov Oly
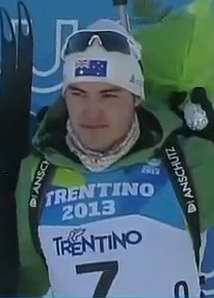

Personal information
- Full name: Alex Almoukov
- Born: 22 March 1990 (age 36) Tyumen, Soviet Union
- Height: 184 cm (6 ft 0 in)

Sport
- Sport: Skiing

World Cup career
- Indiv. podiums: 7
- Indiv. wins: 3
Medal record
Men's biathlon
Representing Australia
Universiade
Bronze medal – third place	2013 Trentino	Pursuit
- Updated on 28 February 2013

Alex Almoukov (born 22 March 1990) is an Australian biathlete. He remains the most successful biathlete in Australia to date.

He competed in the 2010 Winter Olympics for Australia at 18 years of age. He competed in the individual, as well as the sprint.

As of March 2013, his best Biathlon World Cup finish is 33rd, in the individual competition at Sochi in 2012/13.

He won a silver medal in the pursuit event at the World Universiade, Trentino 2013.

He competed in the 2014 Winter Olympics for Australia. Placed 45th in the 20 km individual this is the best result in Australian history for a male biathlete to date.
