= 2012–13 Biathlon World Cup – World Cup 3 =

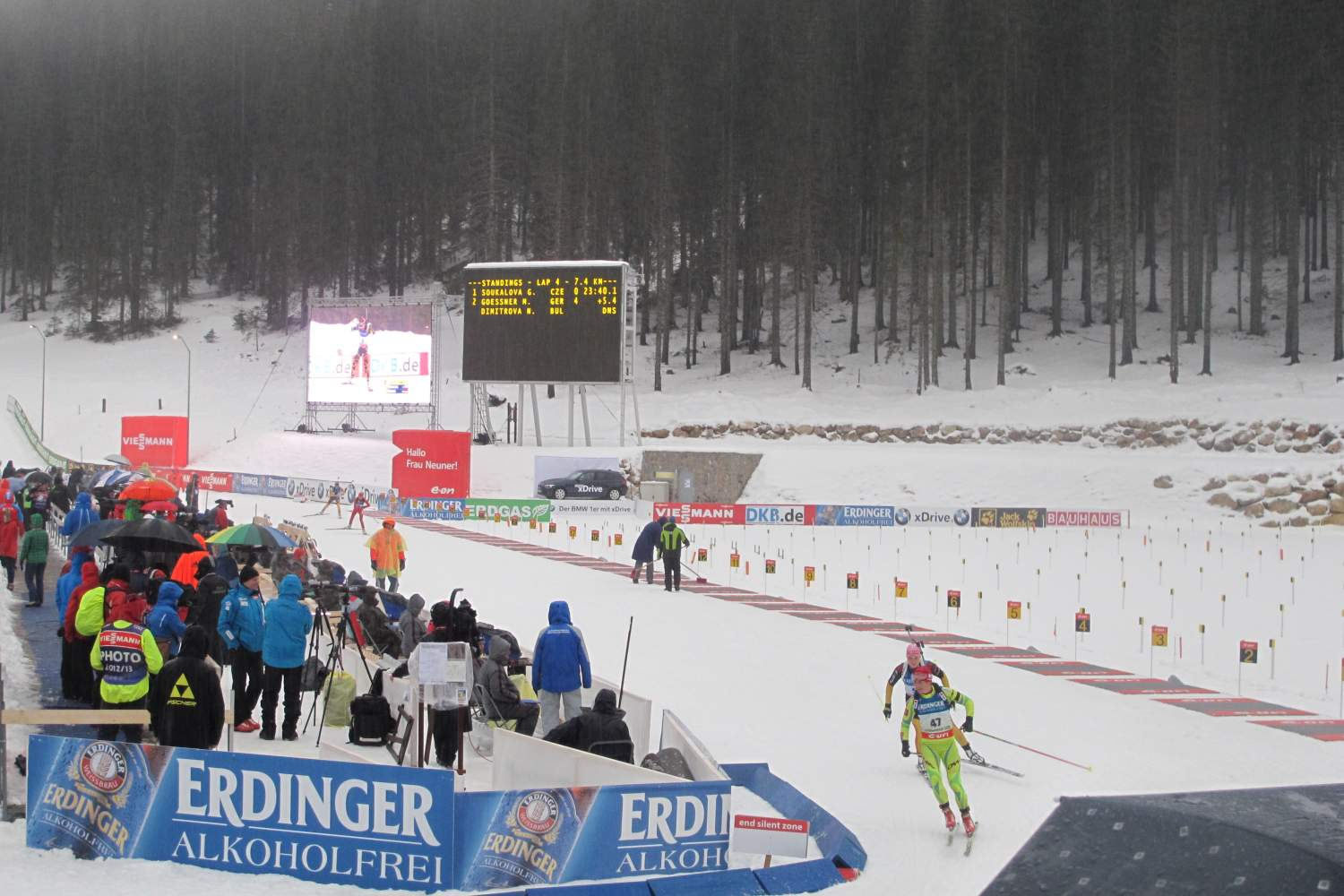
Pokljuka Biathlon World Cup 2012

The 2012–13 Biathlon World Cup – World Cup 3 was held in Pokljuka, Slovenia, from 13 December until 16 December 2012.

== Schedule of events ==
Date	Time	Events
December 13	14:20 CET	Men's 10 km Sprint
December 14	14:20 CET	Women's 7.5 km Sprint
December 15	12:45 CET	Men's 12.5 km Pursuit
December 15	15:00 CET	Women's 10 km Pursuit
December 16	13:00 CET	Men's 15 km Mass Start
December 16	15:00 CET	Women's 12.5 km Mass Start

== Medal winners ==
=== Men ===
Event:	Gold:	Time	Silver:	Time	Bronze:	Time
10 km Sprint details	Jakov Fak; Slovenia	24:41.7 (0+0)	Emil Hegle Svendsen; Norway	24:42.5 (0+1)	Martin Fourcade; France	24:47.8 (0+0)
12.5 km Pursuit details	Emil Hegle Svendsen; Norway	32:49.2 (0+0+0+1)	Ondřej Moravec; Czech Republic	32:53.0 (0+0+0+1)	Martin Fourcade; France	33:06.6 (0+0+0+2)
15 km Mass Start details	Andreas Birnbacher; Germany	35:39.4 (0+0+0+0)	Jakov Fak; Slovenia	35:57.1 (0+0+1+1)	Tim Burke; United States	36:02.0 (0+0+1+1)

=== Women ===
Event:	Gold:	Time	Silver:	Time	Bronze:	Time
7.5 km Sprint details	Gabriela Soukalová; Czech Republic	22:09.8 (0+0)	Miriam Gössner; Germany	22:11.9 (0+2)	Nadezhda Skardino; Belarus	22:39.9 (0+0)
10 km Pursuit details	Miriam Gössner; Germany	31:47.8 (2+1+1+1)	Gabriela Soukalová; Czech Republic	31:48.5 (0+0+0+0)	Marie Dorin Habert; France	32:14.3 (0+1+0+0)
12.5 km Mass Start details	Tora Berger; Norway	35:53.8 (0+2+0+0)	Miriam Gössner; Germany	36:29.3 (0+3+0+1)	Gabriela Soukalová; Czech Republic	36:55.9 (0+2+0+0)

== Achievements ==
Best performance for all time

- Vladimir Iliev (BUL), 6th place in Sprint
- Simon Desthieux (FRA), 25th place in Sprint
- Mario Dolder (SUI), 30th place in Sprint and 25th in Pursuit
- Tomas Kaukėnas (LTU), 41st place in Sprint
- Scott Gow (CAN), 50th place in Sprint and Pursuit
- Darko Damjanovski (MKD), 95th place in Sprint
- Ondřej Moravec (CZE), 2nd place in Pursuit
- Andrejs Rastorgujevs (LAT), 10th place in Pursuit
- Gabriela Soukalová (CZE), 1st place in Sprint
- Nadezhda Skardino (BLR), 3rd place in Sprint
- Rosanna Crawford (CAN), 12th place in Sprint
- Nadzeya Pisareva (BLR), 21st place in Sprint
- Nicole Gontier (ITA), 30th place in Sprint
- Asa Lif (SWE), 56th place in Sprint and 45th place in Pursuit
- Alina Raikova (KAZ), 58th place in Sprint and 57th place in Pursuit
- Miriam Gössner (GER), 1st place in Pursuit
- Evi Sachenbacher-Stehle (GER), 48th place in Pursuit

First World Cup race

- Johannes Kühn (GER), 17th place in Sprint
- Dmytro Pidruchnyi (UKR), 98th place in Sprint
- Evi Sachenbacher-Stehle (GER), 59th place in Sprint
