= 2012–13 Biathlon World Cup – World Cup 7 =

The 2012–13 Biathlon World Cup – World Cup 7 was held in Oslo, Norway, from 28 February until 3 March 2013.

== Schedule of events ==
Date	Time	Events
February 28	14:00 CET	Men's 10 km Sprint
March 1	15:30 CET	Women's 7.5 km Sprint
March 2	14:00 CET	Women's 10 km Pursuit
March 2	15:45 CET	Men's 12.5 km Pursuit
March 3	11:30 CET	Women's 12.5 km Mass Start
March 3	15:00 CET	Men's 15 km Mass Start

== Medal winners ==
=== Men ===
Event:	Gold:	Time	Silver:	Time	Bronze:	Tim
10 km Sprint details	Tarjei Bø; Norway	25:44.5 (0+0)	Martin Fourcade; France	25:44.6 (1+1)	Andriy Deryzemlya; Ukraine	25:52.2 (0+0)
12.5 km Pursuit details	Martin Fourcade; France	33:48.2 (0+1+0+1)	Tarjei Bø; Norway	34:15.9 (0+2+0+1)	Alexandr Loginov; Russia	34:23.7 (0+2+0+1)
15 km Mass Start details	Ondřej Moravec; Czech Republic	39:48.7 (0+0+0+1)	Martin Fourcade; France	40:02.4 (1+0+0+2)	Erik Lesser; Germany	40:05.5 (0+0+1+0)

=== Women ===
Event:	Gold:	Time	Silver:	Time	Bronze:	Time
7.5 km Sprint details	Tora Berger; Norway	21:31.2 (0+0)	Darya Domracheva; Belarus	21:43.2 (1+1)	Anastasiya Kuzmina; Slovakia	22:02.1 (1+1)
10 km Pursuit details	Tora Berger; Norway	32:12.2 (0+1+2+1)	Marie Dorin Habert; France	32:43.4 (0+0+1+1)	Anastasiya Kuzmina; Slovakia	32:57.3 (1+0+2+1)
12.5 km Mass Start details	Tora Berger; Norway	36:58.8 (0+0+0+2)	Anastasiya Kuzmina; Slovakia	37:04.2 (0+2+0+0)	Darya Domracheva; Belarus	37:22.1 (0+1+2+0)

== Achievements ==
Best performance for all time

- Anton Pantov (KAZ), 59th place in Sprint
- Damir Rastić (SRB), 69th place in Sprint
- Matti Hakala (FIN), 75th place in Sprint
- Dino Butkovic (CRO), 76th place in Sprint
- Alexandr Loginov (RUS), 3rd place in Pursuit
- Alexandr Pechenkin (RUS), 22nd place in Pursuit
- Johannes Thingnes Bø (NOR), 25th place in Pursuit
- Milanko Petrović (SRB), 35th place in Pursuit
- Ondřej Moravec (CZE), 1st place in Mass Start
- Mariya Panfilova (UKR), 17th place in Sprint
- Nadzeya Pisareva (BLR), 20th place in Sprint
- Evi Sachenbacher-Stehle (GER), 32nd place in Sprint and 29th in Pursuit
- Emilia Yordanova (BUL), 34th place in Sprint and 19th in Pursuit
- Zanna Juskane (LAT), 43rd place in Sprint
- Katharina Innerhofer (AUT), 45th place in Sprint
- Stefani Popova (BUL), 69th place in Sprint
- Anna Kistanova (KAZ), 79th place in Sprint
- Tiril Eckhoff (NOR), 6th place in Pursuit
- Irina Starykh (RUS), 21st place in Pursuit
- Valentina Nazarova (RUS), 34th place in Pursuit
- Johanna Taliharm (EST), 45th place in Pursuit

First World Cup race

- Alexandr Loginov (RUS), 5th place in Sprint
- Maxim Tsvetkov (RUS), 8th place in Sprint
- Johannes Thingnes Bø (NOR), 28th place in Sprint
- Alexandr Pechenkin (RUS), 53rd place in Sprint
- Dmytro Rusinov (UKR), 54th place in Sprint
- Sean Doherty (USA), 85th place in Sprint
- Laura Dahlmeier (GER), 7th place in Sprint
- Irina Starykh (RUS), 37th place in Sprint
- Valentina Nazarova (RUS), 57th place in Sprint
- Mona Brorsson (SWE), 71st place in Sprint
- Kim Adolfsson (SWE), 80th place in Sprint
