= Jean-Philippe Le Guellec =

Canadian biathlete

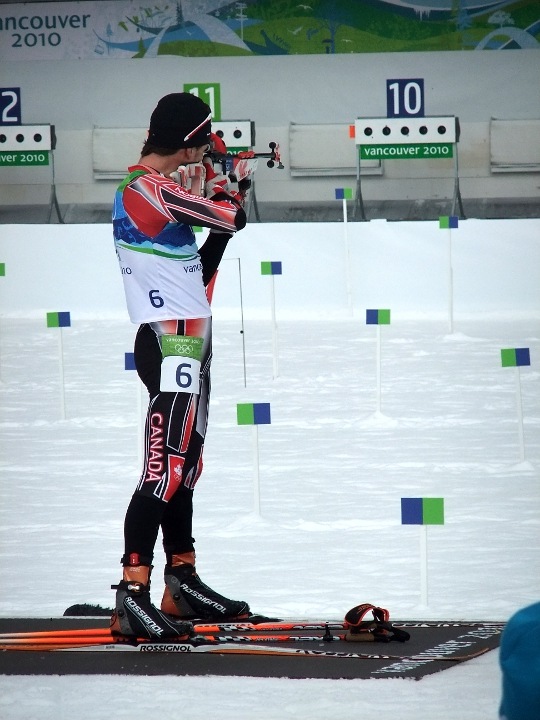
- Le Guellec competing at the 2010 Winter Olympics in Vancouver.

Personal information
- Full name: Jean-Philippe Le Guellec
- Born: 31 July 1985 (age 40) Kingston, Ontario, Canada
- Height: 1.70 m (5 ft 7 in)

Sport

Professional information
- Sport: Biathlon
- Club: SV Union Frojach
- World Cup debut: 26 November 2005
- Retired: 18 February 2014

Olympic Games
- Teams: 3 (2006, 2010, 2014)
- Medals: 0

World Championships
- Teams: 7 (2007, 2008, 2009, 2010, 2011, 2012, 2013)
- Medals: 0

World Cup
- Seasons: 9 (2005/06–2013/14)
- Individual victories: 1
- All victories: 1
- Individual podiums: 1
- All podiums: 1
Medal record
Men's biathlon
Representing Canada
Junior World Championships
Bronze medal – third place	2005 Kontiolahti	4 × 7.5 km relay
Bronze medal – third place	2006 Presque Isle	10 km sprint
Youth World Championships
Gold medal – first place	2004 Haute Maurienne	7.5 km sprint
Silver medal – second place	2004 Haute Maurienne	10 km pursuit
Silver medal – second place	2004 Haute Maurienne	3 × 7.5 km relay

Jean-Philippe Le Guellec (born 31 July 1985) is a former Canadian biathlete.

Le Guellec began competing in the biathlon in 1999, and joined the national team in 2003. He had significant success at the Junior World Championships, winning two medals in youth races at Haute Maurienne in 2004, and a bronze medal as a junior two years later in Presque Isle.

His best career season on the Biathlon World Cup circuit came in 2008/09, when he finished 32nd in the overall standings. This included his first two top 10 WC finishes, an 8th in the Hochfilzen pursuit and a 7th in the Antholz-Anterselva pursuit. His top finish in the Biathlon World Championships also came in Antholz-Anterselva, a 40th place in the 2007 individual race.

Le Guellec competed in two events at the 2006 Olympics in Turin. His best showing came in the 20 kilometre individual, where he finished 48th.

Le Guellec qualified for the 2010 Winter Olympics in Vancouver. On February 14, 2010, he finished sixth in the men's sprint, which was the highest he had ever placed in any event up to that point.

He won his first World Cup race on 1 December 2012 in Östersund, Sweden, where he won the sprint in the first World Cup for the season.

Le Guellec retired from the sport at the end of the 2013–14 season.
