= Elin Mattsson =

Swedish biathlete (born 1986)

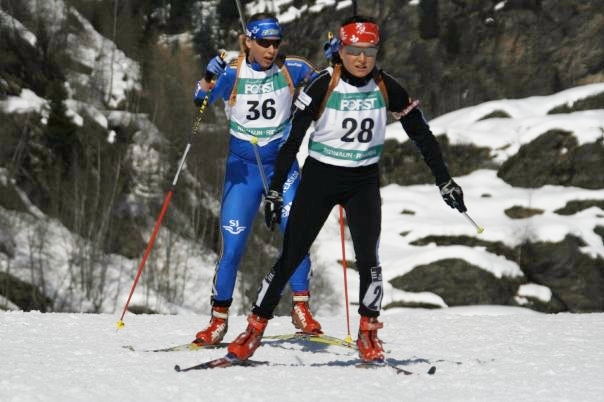
- Elin Mattsson (number 36) during an IBU Cup competition in March 2009

Personal information
- Born: 21 September 1986; Torsby, Sweden

Sport
- Sport: biathlon

Elin Mattsson (born 21 September 1986 in Torsby), is a Swedish biathlete. Mattsson made her World Cup debut during the 2009/2010 biathlon start in Östersund.
