= 2012–13 Biathlon World Cup – World Cup 8 =

The 2012–13 Biathlon World Cup – World Cup 8 was held in Sochi, Russia, from 7 March until 10 March 2013.

== Schedule of events ==
Date	Time	Events
March 7	12:15 CET	Women's 15 km Individual
March 7	15:30 CET	Men's 20 km Individual
March 9	13:00 CET	Men's 10 km Sprint
March 9	16:00 CET	Women's 7.5 km Sprint
March 10	12:30 CET	Men's 4x7.5 km Relay
March 10	15:30 CET	Women's 4x6 km Relay

== Medal winners ==
=== Men ===
Event:	Gold:	Time	Silver:	Time	Bronze:	Tim
20 km Individual details	Martin Fourcade; France	49:40.6 (1+0+0+0)	Andreas Birnbacher; Germany	49:47.5 (0+0+0+0)	Serhiy Semenov; Ukraine	50:12.5 (0+0+0+0)
10 km Sprint details	Martin Fourcade; France	25:17.3 (0+0)	Evgeny Ustyugov; Russia	25:59.6 (0+1)	Henrik L'Abée-Lund; Norway	26:08.3 (0+0)
4x7.5 km Relay details	Russia; Anton Shipulin; Alexandr Loginov; Dmitry Malyshko; Evgeny Ustyugov	1:09:50.8 (0+1) (0+1) (1+3) (0+1) (0+0) (0+0) (0+0) (0+0)	Germany; Erik Lesser; Andreas Birnbacher; Arnd Peiffer; Benedikt Doll	1:10:29.1 (0+3) (0+0) (0+1) (0+0) (0+0) (0+1) (0+2) (0+3)	Czech Republic; Michal Šlesingr; Jaroslav Soukup; Vit Janov; Ondřej Moravec	1:10:33.7 (0+2) (0+2) (0+3) (0+1) (0+3) (0+1) (0+0) (0+1)

=== Women ===
Event:	Gold:	Time	Silver:	Time	Bronze:	Time
15 km Individual details	Darya Domracheva; Belarus	45:45.2 (0+0+0+2)	Olga Zaitseva; Russia	46:19.8 (0+0+0+0)	Tora Berger; Norway	46:32.0 (0+1+0+0)
7.5 km Sprint details	Magdalena Gwizdoń; Poland	25:28.7 (0+0)	Anastasiya Kuzmina; Slovakia	25:38.9 (1+0)	Tora Berger; Norway	25:42.4 (0+1)
4x6 km Relay details	Germany; Andrea Henkel; Evi Sachenbacher-Stehle; Miriam Gössner; Laura Dahlmeier	1:09:27.1 (0+1) (0+0) (0+0) (0+2) (0+1) (1+3) (0+0) (0+0)	Ukraine; Juliya Dzhyma; Olena Pidhrushna; Valj Semerenko; Mariya Panfilova	1:09:39.0 (0+0) (0+1) (0+0) (0+1) (0+1) (0+2) (0+0) (0+1)	Norway; Hilde Fenne; Tiril Eckhoff; Ann Kristin Flatland; Tora Berger	1:09:48.3 (0+1) (0+2) (0+0) (0+3) (0+1) (0+1) (0+0) (0+2)

== Achievements ==
Best performance for all time

- Serhiy Semenov (UKR), 3rd place in Individual
- Andrejs Rastorgujevs (LAT), 4th place in Individual
- Benedikt Doll (GER), 6th place in Individual
- Alexey Slepov (RUS), 27th place in Individual and 9th in Sprint
- Alexei Almoukov (AUS), 33rd place in Individual
- Sergey Klyachin (RUS), 38th place in Individual
- Dmytro Pidruchnyi (UKR), 46th place in Individual
- Damir Rastić (SRB), 59th place in Individual
- Krisjanis Meirans (LAT), 96th place in Individual
- Henrik L'Abée-Lund (NOR), 3rd place in Sprint
- Dominik Windisch (ITA), 5th place in Sprint
- Johannes Thingnes Bø (NOR), 20th place in Sprint
- Vit Janov (CZE), 39th place in Sprint
- Mariya Panfilova (UKR), 13th place in Individual
- Annelies Cook (USA), 14th place in Individual
- Iris Schwabl (AUT), 19th place in Individual
- Hilde Fenne (NOR), 25th place in Individual
- Victoria Padial (ESP), 40th place in Individual
- Galina Vishnevskaya (KAZ), 43rd place in Individual
- Chardine Sloof (NED), 66th place in Individual
- Jaqueline Mourão (BRA), 83rd place in Individual
- Outi Groendahl (FIN), 87th place in Individual
- Evi Sachenbacher-Stehle (GER), 6th place in Sprint
- Jitka Landová (CZE), 37th place in Sprint
- Vanessa Hinz (GER), 43rd place in Sprint
- Sanna Markkanen (FIN), 57th place in Sprint

First World Cup race

- Vanessa Hinz (GER), 45th place in Individual
- Olga Podchufarova (RUS), 58th place in Sprint
