= Ekaterina Shumilova =

Russian biathlete

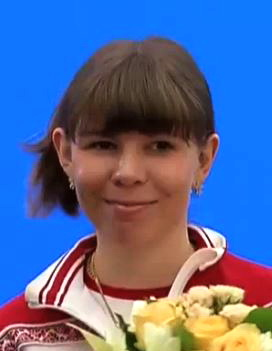
- Shumilova on 24 February 2014

Personal information
- Native name: Екатерина Евгеньевна Шумилова
- Full name: Ekaterina Yevgenyevna Shumilova
- Nationality: Russian
- Born: 25 October 1986 (age 39) Solikamsk, Perm Oblast, Soviet Union

Sport

Professional information
- Club: CSKA
- World Cup debut: 3 December 2005

World Cup
- Seasons: 7 (2006/07; 2011/12–)
- All races: 100
- All podiums: 4
Medal record
Women's biathlon
Representing Russia
Olympic Games
Disqualified	2014 Sochi	4 × 6 km relay
Junior World Championships
Bronze medal – third place	2006 Presque Isle	3 × 6 km relay
European Championships
Gold medal – first place	2015 Otepää	10 km pursuit
Bronze medal – third place	2015 Otepää	7.5 km sprint
Bronze medal – third place	2010 Otepää	10 km pursuit
Bronze medal – third place	2010 Otepää	4 × 6 km relay
- Updated on 11 August 2017

Ekaterina Yevgenyevna Shumilova (Russian: Екатери́на Евге́ньевна Шуми́лова; born 25 October 1986 in Solikamsk) is a Russian biathlete. She competed at the Biathlon World Championships 2013 in Nové Město na Moravě, where she placed fourth in the relay with the Russian team. She competed at the 2014 Winter Olympics in Sochi in sprint, pursuit, and relay. She initially won a silver medal in the relay; however, the team was disqualified when a teammate tested positive for doping, and the medal was stripped.
