= Dmitry Malyshko =

Russian biathlete

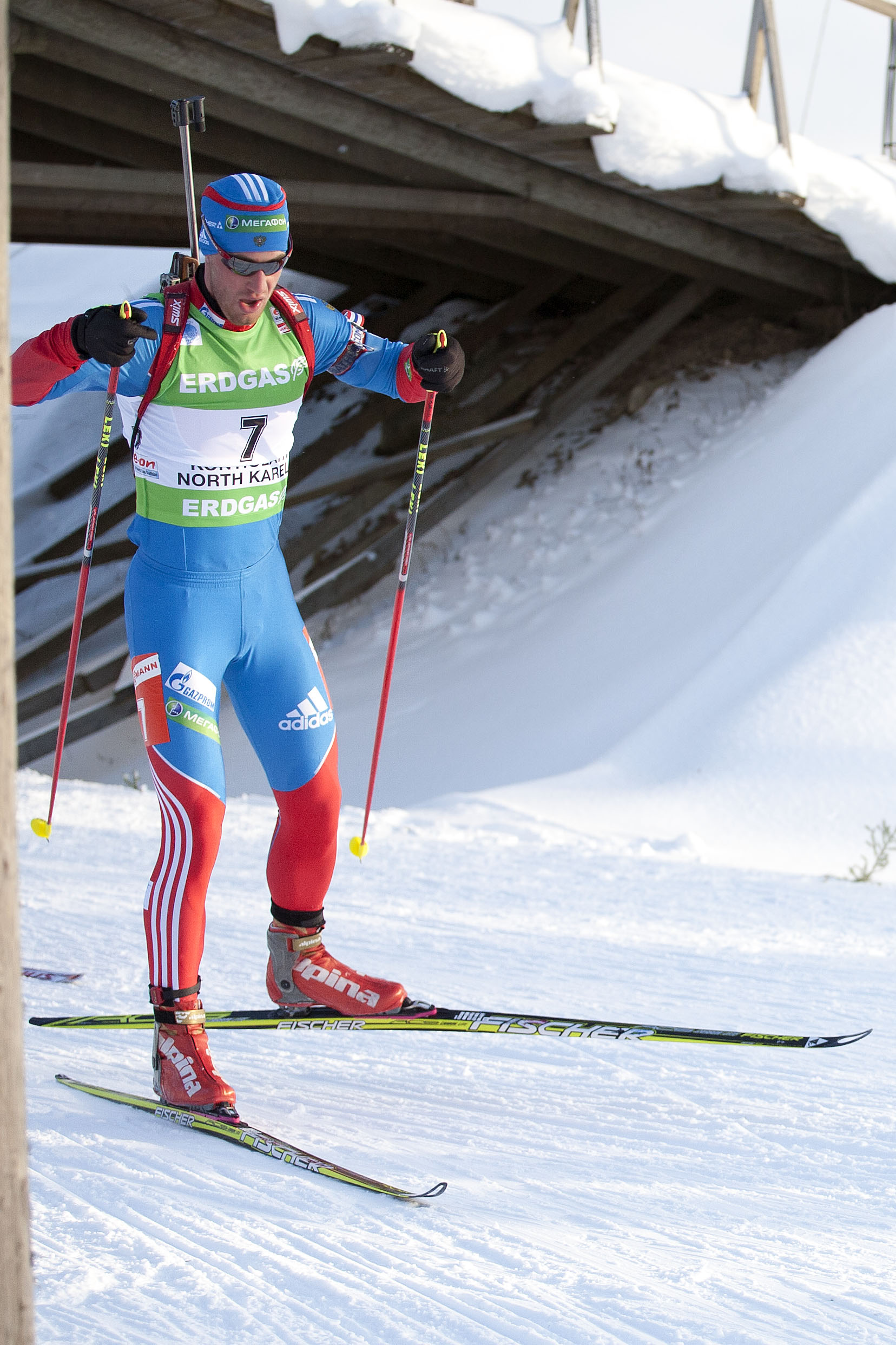

Personal information
- Full name: Dmitry Vladimirovich Malyshko
- Nationality: Russian
- Born: Sosnovy Bor, RSFSR, Soviet Union
- Height: 1.84 m (6 ft 0 in)
- Weight: 79 kg (174 lb)

Sport

Professional information
- Sport: Biathlon
- Club: Dynamo
- World Cup debut: 9 December 2011
- Retired: 2020

Olympic Games
- Teams: 1 (2014)
- Medals: 1 (1 gold)

World Championships
- Teams: 5 (2012–2016, 2019)
- Medals: 1 (0 gold)

World Cup
- Seasons: 8 (2011/12–)
- Individual victories: 2
- All victories: 10
- Individual podiums: 6
- All podiums: 22
Medal record
Men's biathlon
Representing Russia
Olympic Games
Disqualified	2014 Sochi	4 × 7.5 km relay
World Championships
Bronze medal – third place	2019 Östersund	4 × 7.5 km relay
European Championships
Gold medal – first place	2019 Raubichi	Single mixed relay
Silver medal – second place	2010 Otepää	4 × 7.5 km relay
Bronze medal – third place	2019 Raubichi	Sprint
- Updated on 16 March 2019

Dmitry Vladimirovich Malyshko (Russian: Дмитрий Владимирович Малышко; born 19 March 1987) is a former Russian biathlete, who has been competing on the World Cup circuit since the 2011–12 season. He debuted at World Cup on 9 December 2011. He got his first podium in individual races on 12 February 2012.

Together with Anton Shipulin, Alexey Volkov and Evgeny Ustyugov he won the gold medal in the Men's Relay at the 2014 Winter Olympics, in Sochi, Russia.

== Biathlon results ==
All results are sourced from the International Biathlon Union.

=== Olympic Games ===
1 medal (1 gold)

Event	Individual	Sprint	Pursuit	Mass start	Relay	Mixed relay
(Russia) 2014 Sochi	—	28th	33rd	20th	DSQ (1st)	—

=== World Championships ===
1 medal (1 bronze)

Event	Individual	Sprint	Pursuit	Mass start	Relay	Mixed relay	Single mixed relay
(Germany) 2012 Ruhpolding	35th	—	—	—	6th	5th	—N/a
(Czech Republic) 2013 Nové Město	—	5th	4th	15th	4th	6th	—N/a
(Finland) 2015 Kontiolahti	—	34th	47th	—	4th	—	—N/a
(Norway) 2016 Oslo	64th	—	—	—	—	—	—N/a
(Sweden) 2019 Östersund	—	33rd	30th	—	Bronze	4th	—

*During Olympic seasons competitions are only held for those events not included in the Olympic program.
**The single mixed relay was added as an event in 2019.

=== Individual victories ===
2 victories (1 Sp, 1 Pu)

Season	Date	Location	Discipline	Level
2012–13; 2 victories (1 Sp, 1 Pu)	5 January 2013	(Germany) Oberhof	10 km sprint	Biathlon World Cup
2012–13; 2 victories (1 Sp, 1 Pu)	6 January 2013	(Germany) Oberhof	12.5 km pursuit	Biathlon World Cup

*Results are from UIPMB and IBU races which include the Biathlon World Cup, Biathlon World Championships and the Winter Olympic Games.
