= Ekaterina Glazyrina =

Russian biathlete (born 1987)

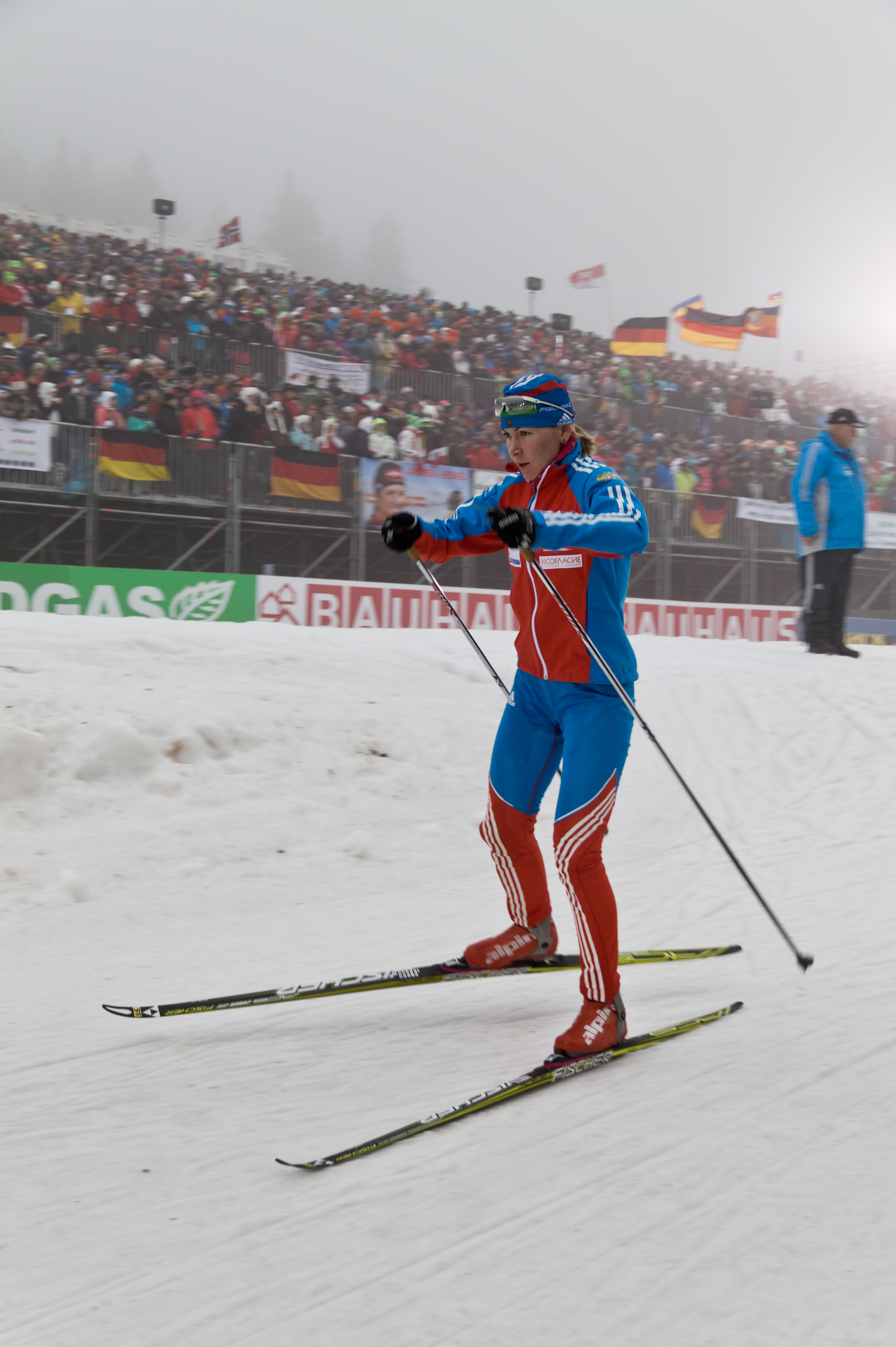
- Glazyrina in Oberhof, 2013

Personal information
- Native name: Екатерина Ивановна Глазырина
- Full name: Ekaterina Ivanovna Glazyrina
- Nationality: Russian
- Born: 22 April 1987 (age 39) Chaykovsky, Perm Oblast, Soviet Union

Sport

Professional information
- Club: Dinamo
- World Cup debut: 4 February 2011

World Cup
- Seasons: 6 (2010/11–)
- All races: 88
- Individual podiums: 2
- All podiums: 6
Medal record
European Championships
| Bronze medal – third place | 2010 Otepää | 4 × 6 km relay |
| Bronze medal – third place | 2011 Ridnaun | Individual |
- Updated on 17 December 2016

Ekaterina Ivanovna Glazyrina (Russian: Екатерина Ивановна Глазырина; born 22 April 1987) is a Russian biathlete.

== Career ==
She competed in Biathlon World Cup since 2011. Glazyrina won medals at the European championships, including two gold medals in the relay event.

On 10 February 2017, IBU provisionally suspended her for doping violations during the 2014 Winter Olympics. On 4 May 2018, she was disqualified for two years, and all her results from 2013 were annulled.
