= Olga Vilukhina =

Russian biathlete (born 1988)

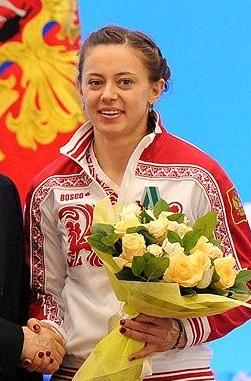
- Vilukhina in 2014

Personal information
- Full name: Olga Gennadyevna Vilukhina
- Born: 22 March 1988 (age 38) Mezhgorye, Republic of Bashkortostan, Russian SFSR, Soviet Union
- Height: 1.72 m (5 ft 8 in)

Sport

Professional information
- Sport: Biathlon
- Club: SV Union Frojach
- World Cup debut: 27 March 2009

Olympic Games
- Teams: 1 (2014)
- Medals: 2 (0 gold)

World Championships
- Teams: 2 (2012, 2013)
- Medals: 1 (0 gold)

World Cup
- Seasons: 6 (2008/09, 2010/11–2013/14)
- Individual victories: 0
- All victories: 3
- Individual podiums: 5
- All podiums: 11
Medal record
Women's biathlon
Representing Russia
Olympic Games
Silver medal – second place	2014 Sochi	7.5 km sprint
Disqualified	2014 Sochi	4 × 6 km relay
World Championships
Bronze medal – third place	2012 Ruhpolding	10 km pursuit
Junior World Championships
Silver medal – second place	2009 Canmore	3 × 6 km relay
Bronze medal – third place	2008 Ruhpolding	3 × 6 km relay
Youth World Championships
Gold medal – first place	2006 Presque Isle	6 km sprint
Silver medal – second place	2006 Presque Isle	3 × 6 km relay
Silver medal – second place	2007 Martell	3 × 6 km relay
Bronze medal – third place	2006 Presque Isle	7.5 km pursuit
European Championships
Bronze medal – third place	2010 Otepää	Relay

Olga Gennadyevna Vilukhina (Russian: Ольга Геннадьевна Вилухина; born 22 March 1988) is a former Russian biathlete, who was competing on the World Cup circuit since the 2008–09 season.

== Career ==
She has had four Top 10 finishes in World Cup races in individual races. Vilukhina was born in Mezhgorye, Bashkir ASSR, Soviet Union. She has won gold at 2006 Junior World Championships in Sprint. In the 2014 Winter Olympics in Sochi, she finished second in the sprint and was the first leg of the relay team which won silver.

Before the start of the 2014–2015 season the coach announced that Olga Vilukhina will miss him.

After lackluster results in 2015–2016, she announced the end of her career before the start of the 2016–2017 season, citing lack of motivation.

In December 2016, the IBU provisionally suspended her for doping violations during the 2014 Winter Olympics, along with Yana Romanova. On 27 November 2017, the IOC disqualified Vilukhina and Romanova, banned them for life from the Olympics, and stripped them of their Olympic medals. On 24 September 2020, Vilukhina's disqualificationin the individual races was overturned by the CAS, with her silver medal in the sprint restored.

== Career results ==
=== Olympic Games ===
Event	Individual	Sprint	Pursuit	Mass Start	Relay	Mixed Relay
(Russia) 2014 Sochi	–	Silver	7th	21st	DSQ (2nd)	DSQ (4th)

=== World Championships ===
Event	Individual	Sprint	Pursuit	Mass start	Relay	Mixed relay
(Germany) 2012 Ruhpolding	8th	8th	Bronze	19th	7th	5th
(Czech Republic) 2013 Nové Město	10th	5th	22nd	23rd	4th	6th

=== World Cup ===
==== Podiums ====
Date	Place	Competition	Placement	Level
1 March 2012	(Germany) Ruhpolding	Pursuit	3rd	Biathlon World Championships
1 December 2012	(Sweden) Östersund	Sprint	3rd	Biathlon World Cup
16 March 2013	(Russia) Khanty-Mansiysk	Pursuit	2nd	Biathlon World Cup
9 February 2014	(Russia) Sochi	Sprint	2nd	Winter Olympic Games
22 March 2014	(Norway) Holmenkollen	Pursuit	3rd	Biathlon World Cup
