= Biathlon World Championships 2016 – Men's pursuit =

Men's pursuit at the Biathlon World Championships 2016
- Venue: Oslo, Norway
- Date: 6 March
- Competitors: 60 from 22 nations
- Winning time: 32:56.5

Medalists
gold medal	Martin Fourcade	France
silver medal	Ole Einar Bjørndalen	Norway
bronze medal	Emil Hegle Svendsen	Norway

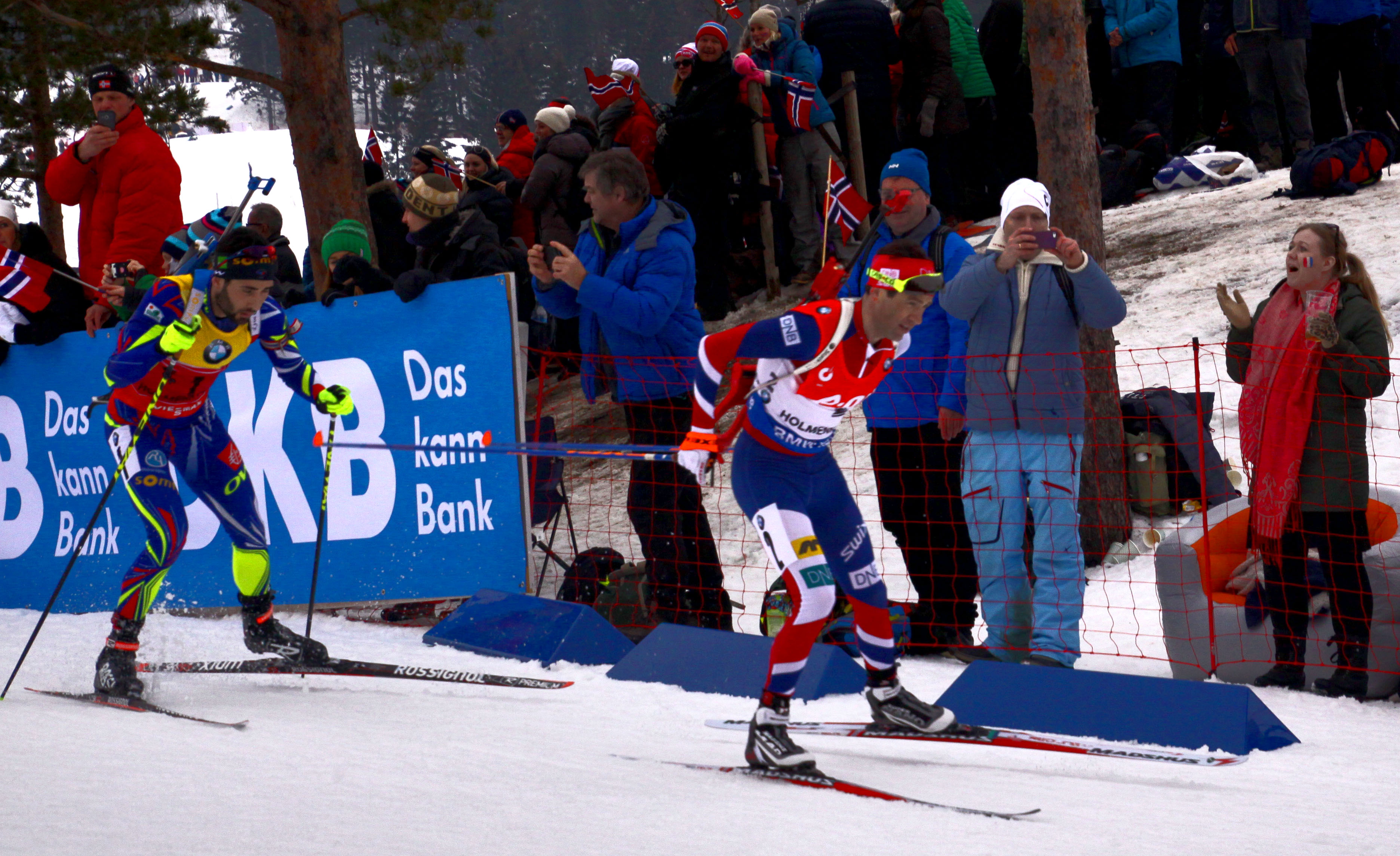
Ole Einar Bjørndalen and Martin Fourcade during the race.

The Men's pursuit event of the Biathlon World Championships 2016 was held on 6 March 2016. The fastest 60 athletes of the sprint competition participated over a course of 12.5 km.

== Results ==
The race was started at 13:30 CET.

Rank	Bib	Name	Nationality	Start	Penalties (P+P+S+S)	Time	Deficit
1st place, gold medalist(s)	1	Martin Fourcade	France	0:00	3 (0+0+1+2)	32:56.5	
2nd place, silver medalist(s)	2	Ole Einar Bjørndalen	Norway	0:27	2 (1+0+0+1)	33:16.6	+20.1
3rd place, bronze medalist(s)	17	Emil Hegle Svendsen	Norway	1:16	1 (0+0+0+1)	33:27.7	+31.2
4	4	Johannes Thingnes Bø	Norway	0:36	3 (0+2+0+1)	33:34.8	+38.3
5	39	Jakov Fak	Slovenia	1:47	0 (0+0+0+0)	33:38.4	+41.9
6	12	Simon Desthieux	France	1:00	0 (0+0+0+0)	33:39.4	+42.9
7	19	Erik Lesser	Germany	1:19	2 (0+0+0+2)	33:39.8	+43.3
8	3	Serhiy Semenov	Ukraine	0:28	3 (1+0+1+1)	33:46.5	+50.0
9	45	Anton Shipulin	Russia	1:58	1 (0+0+0+1)	33:56.4	+59.9
10	16	Quentin Fillon Maillet	France	1:13	2 (0+1+1+0)	33:56.4	+59.9
11	6	Evgeniy Garanichev	Russia	0:40	4 (1+0+1+2)	33:58.1	+1:01.6
12	15	Michal Šlesingr	Czech Republic	1:10	1 (0+1+0+0)	34:02.7	+1:06.2
13	7	Arnd Peiffer	Germany	0:42	3 (0+0+1+2)	34:13.5	+1:17.0
14	9	Dominik Landertinger	Austria	0:46	4 (1+1+0+2)	34:18.4	+1:21.9
15	46	Nathan Smith	Canada	1:59	2 (0+1+1+0)	34:19.7	+1:23.2
16	27	Simon Eder	Austria	1:34	3 (0+2+1+0)	34:23.3	+1:26.8
17	14	Tim Burke	United States	1:09	3 (0+0+1+2)	34:23.8	+1:27.3
18	8	Simon Schempp	Germany	0:44	4 (1+2+0+1)	34:30.1	+1:33.6
19	40	Yan Savitskiy	Kazakhstan	1:48	1 (0+1+0+0)	34:34.5	+1:38.0
20	11	Serafin Wiestner	Switzerland	0:57	3 (0+0+1+2)	34:43.2	+1:46.7
21	23	Anton Babikov	Russia	1:24	3 (0+1+1+1)	34:52.6	+1:56.1
22	24	Michal Krčmář	Czech Republic	1:25	2 (0+0+1+1)	34:56.0	+1:59.5
23	13	Vladimir Chepelin	Belarus	1:08	4 (0+0+1+3)	34:56.4	+1:59.9
24	10	Vladimir Iliev	Bulgaria	0:52	5 (3+0+1+1)	34:56.7	+2:00.2
25	28	Oleksander Zhyrnyi	Ukraine	1:35	2 (0+1+0+1)	35:02.8	+2:06.3
26	36	Julian Eberhard	Austria	1:45	6 (3+1+2+0)	35:04.2	+2:07.7
27	20	Andrejs Rastorgujevs	Latvia	1:20	5 (0+2+1+2)	35:05.9	+2:09.4
28	5	Dominik Windisch	Italy	0:40	6 (0+3+1+2)	35:08.7	+2:12.2
29	34	Krasimir Anev	Bulgaria	1:41	3 (0+0+1+2)	35:09.5	+2:13.0
30	25	Martin Otčenáš	Slovakia	1:29	3 (0+0+2+1)	35:21.2	+2:24.7
31	54	Tarjei Bø	Norway	2:10	3 (0+1+1+1)	35:27.7	+2:31.2
32	22	Artem Pryma	Ukraine	1:22	4 (2+1+1+0)	35:29.2	+2:32.7
33	35	Brendan Green	Canada	1:44	3 (1+1+1+0)	35:29.4	+2:32.9
34	30	Fredrik Lindström	Sweden	1:35	3 (0+1+1+1)	35:32.4	+2:35.9
35	37	Roland Lessing	Estonia	1:45	2 (1+0+1+0)	35:32.7	+2:36.2
36	29	Lowell Bailey	United States	1:35	5 (0+0+2+3)	35:53.7	+2:57.2
37	56	Thomas Bormolini	Italy	2:15	2 (0+2+0+0)	35:55.7	+2:59.2
38	31	Jesper Nelin	Sweden	1:37	4 (0+0+1+3)	35:57.5	+3:01.0
39	33	Benedikt Doll	Germany	1:41	6 (2+2+1+1)	36:13.0	+3:16.5
40	53	Simon Fourcade	France	2:09	4 (2+0+1+1)	36:17.3	+3:20.8
41	60	Jaroslav Soukup	Czech Republic	2:28	2 (0+0+1+1)	36:20.2	+3:23.7
42	49	Michail Kletcherov	Bulgaria	2:06	2 (0+1+1+0)	36:25.9	+3:29.4
43	42	Maxim Tsvetkov	Russia	1:54	4 (1+1+0+2)	36:32.7	+3:36.2
44	57	Matej Kazár	Slovakia	2:21	3 (1+0+2+0)	36:35.9	+3:39.4
45	43	Sean Doherty	United States	1:57	5 (0+2+1+2)	36:48.6	+3:52.1
46	32	Aliaksandr Darozhka	Belarus	1:37	6 (0+1+2+3)	36:58.0	+4:01.5
47	21	Tomas Kaukėnas	Lithuania	1:20	7 (2+1+3+1)	37:09.3	+4:12.8
48	51	Sven Grossegger	Austria	2:08	4 (2+0+0+2)	37:18.2	+4:21.7
49	47	Scott Gow	Canada	2:04	6 (0+3+1+2)	37:26.6	+4:30.1
50	26	Cornel Puchianu	Romania	1:29	6 (2+1+1+2)	37:29.6	+4:33.1
51	55	Olli Hiidensalo	Finland	2:12	4 (0+0+1+3)	37:38.2	+4:41.7
52	18	Leif Nordgren	United States	1:17	7 (2+2+1+2)	38:07.3	+5:10.8
53	58	Macx Davies	Canada	2:22	4 (1+0+1+2)	38:23.3	+5:26.8
54	41	Christian De Lorenzi	Italy	1:48	8 (4+3+0+1)	38:24.3	+5:27.8
55	48	Martin Jäger	Switzerland	2:05	8 (3+1+2+2)	38:45.3	+5:48.8
56	50	Klemen Bauer	Slovenia	2:07	6 (2+1+1+2)	39:05.0	+6:08.5
57	38	Kauri Kõiv	Estonia	1:46	7 (0+1+3+3)	39:05.3	+6:08.8
—	52	Benjamin Weger	Switzerland	2:08	9 (4+3+2)	DNF	
—	44	Dmytro Pidruchnyi	Ukraine	1:57	DNS		
—	59	Ondřej Moravec	Czech Republic	2:23	DNS		
