= Biathlon World Championships 2017 – Men's individual =

Men's individual at the Biathlon World Championships 2017
- Location: Hochfilzen, Austria
- Dates: 16 February
- Competitors: 102 from 21 nations
- Winning time: 48:07.4

Medalists
gold medal	Lowell Bailey	United States
silver medal	Ondřej Moravec	Czech Republic
bronze medal	Martin Fourcade	France

The Men's individual competition at the 2017 World Championships was held on 16 February 2017.

== Results ==
The race was started at 14:30.

Rank	Bib	Name	Nationality	Time	Penalties (P+S+P+S)	Deficit
1st place, gold medalist(s)	100	Lowell Bailey	United States	48:07.4	0 (0+0+0+0)	
2nd place, silver medalist(s)	51	Ondřej Moravec	Czech Republic	48:10.7	0 (0+0+0+0)	+3.3
3rd place, bronze medalist(s)	4	Martin Fourcade	France	48:28.6	2 (1+0+1+0)	+21.1
4	27	Erik Lesser	Germany	48:39.4	1 (0+1+0+0)	+32.0
5	15	Serhiy Semenov	Ukraine	48:46.0	1 (0+0+1+0)	+38.6
6	67	Michal Krčmář	Czech Republic	48:51.0	0 (0+0+0+0)	+43.6
7	1	Anton Shipulin	Russia	48:51.3	2 (2+0+0+0)	+43.9
8	96	Johannes Thingnes Bø	Norway	49:19.3	2 (0+0+1+1)	+1:11.9
9	3	Lars Helge Birkeland	Norway	49:21.7	1 (0+0+1+0)	+1:14.3
10	11	Benjamin Weger	Switzerland	49:30.2	1 (0+0+0+1)	+1:22.8
11	99	Alexey Volkov	Russia	49:36.1	1 (1+0+0+0)	+1:28.7
12	80	Simon Eder	Austria	49:39.0	2 (0+1+0+1)	+1:31.6
13	46	Simon Schempp	Germany	49:47.9	2 (0+0+0+2)	+1:40.5
14	101	Julian Eberhard	Austria	50:05.3	3 (2+0+1+0)	+1:57.9
15	59	Daniel Mesotitsch	Austria	50:05.7	1 (1+0+0+0)	+1:58.3
16	78	Krasimir Anev	Bulgaria	50:14.2	2 (1+0+0+1)	+2:06.8
17	6	Quentin Fillon Maillet	France	50:30.4	3 (1+1+0+1)	+2:23.0
18	94	Michal Šlesingr	Czech Republic	50:33.9	3 (0+1+1+1)	+2:26.5
19	58	Benedikt Doll	Germany	50:34.7	3 (1+2+0+0)	+2:27.3
20	73	Evgeniy Garanichev	Russia	50:41.1	3 (0+1+1+1)	+2:33.7
21	90	Dominik Windisch	Italy	50:44.9	3 (1+0+1+1)	+2:37.5
22	13	Jean-Guillaume Béatrix	France	50:48.1	2 (0+2+0+0)	+2:40.7
23	49	Leif Nordgren	United States	51:01.0	2 (1+0+0+1)	+2:53.6
24	63	Vladimir Iliev	Bulgaria	51:09.0	3 (2+0+1+0)	+3:01.6
25	70	Fabien Claude	France	51:12.5	3 (1+1+0+1)	+3:05.1
26	5	Dominik Landertinger	Austria	51:14.1	3 (0+2+0+1)	+3:06.7
27	81	Emil Hegle Svendsen	Norway	51:29.9	3 (1+1+1+0)	+3:22.5
28	61	Dzmitry Abasheu	Belarus	51:34.7	1 (1+0+0+0)	+3:27.3
29	75	Matej Kazár	Slovakia	51:40.7	1 (1+0+0+0)	+3:33.3
30	21	Kauri Kõiv	Estonia	51:50.5	1 (0+1+0+0)	+3:43.1
31	8	Vladimir Chepelin	Belarus	52:09.3	3 (0+2+0+1)	+4:01.9
32	37	Tomáš Krupčík	Czech Republic	52:19.1	3 (2+1+0+0)	+4:11.7
33	93	Yan Savitskiy	Kazakhstan	52:21.0	3 (1+1+0+1)	+4:13.6
34	77	Arnd Peiffer	Germany	52:21.4	4 (3+1+0+0)	+4:14.0
34	88	Lukas Hofer	Italy	52:21.4	4 (3+1+0+0)	+4:14.0
36	74	Tim Burke	United States	52:21.8	4 (1+1+0+2)	+4:14.4
37	44	Torstein Stenersen	Sweden	52:22.9	3 (0+0+3+0)	+4:15.5
38	68	Fredrik Lindström	Sweden	52:27.5	3 (0+1+1+1)	+4:20.1
39	16	Anton Sinapov	Bulgaria	52:28.8	3 (2+1+0+0)	+4:21.4
40	41	Sergey Bocharnikov	Belarus	52:29.4	3 (1+1+0+1)	+4:22.0
41	32	Dmytro Pidruchnyi	Ukraine	52:30.1	4 (1+1+1+1)	+4:22.7
42	50	Macx Davies	Canada	52:32.6	1 (0+0+0+1)	+4:25.2
43	24	Scott Gow	Canada	52:36.5	2 (0+1+0+1)	+4:29.1
44	33	Serafin Wiestner	Switzerland	52:39.7	3 (0+1+1+1)	+4:32.3
45	89	Rene Zahkna	Estonia	52:39.7	2 (0+1+0+1)	+4:39.8
46	12	Tomas Kaukėnas	Lithuania	52:50.5	3 (1+1+1+0)	+4:43.1
47	95	Ole Einar Bjørndalen	Norway	52:57.2	4 (0+1+2+1)	+4:49.8
48	66	Roland Lessing	Estonia	52:58.7	3 (1+1+0+1)	+4:51.3
49	48	Olli Hiidensalo	Finland	53:02.3	3 (1+1+0+1)	+4:54.9
50	22	Miha Dovžan	Slovenia	53:12.1	3 (0+2+0+1)	+5:04.7
51	40	Simon Desthieux	France	53:12.7	4 (1+2+1+0)	+5:05.3
52	83	Sebastian Samuelsson	Sweden	53:22.5	4 (2+1+0+1)	+5:15.1
53	91	Andrzej Nędza-Kubiniec	Poland	53:41.2	2 (0+1+1+0)	+5:33.8
54	7	Jesper Nelin	Sweden	53:59.3	5 (1+1+2+1)	+5:51.9
55	9	Michael Rösch	Belgium	53:59.9	4 (2+0+1+1)	+5:52.5
56	14	Andrejs Rastorgujevs	Latvia	54:01.0	6 (1+2+0+3)	+5:53.6
57	55	Łukasz Szczurek	Poland	54:04.2	3 (1+1+0+1)	+5:56.8
58	23	Sean Doherty	United States	54:11.8	4 (1+1+2+0)	+6:04.4
59	19	Thomas Bormolini	Italy	54:13.7	4 (1+0+3+0)	+6:06.3
60	60	Tomáš Hasilla	Slovakia	54:18.0	3 (1+0+1+1)	+6:10.6
61	92	Raman Yaliotnau	Belarus	54:18.8	4 (1+1+0+2)	+6:11.4
62	86	Junji Nagai	Japan	54:19.4	3 (0+1+0+2)	+6:12.0
63	62	Jeremy Finello	Switzerland	54:21.5	3 (0+1+1+1)	+6:14.1
64	102	Mario Dolder	Switzerland	54:22.4	4 (1+1+0+2)	+6:15.0
65	10	Martin Otčenáš	Slovakia	54:32.2	4 (1+1+2+0)	+6:24.8
66	57	Karol Dombrovski	Lithuania	54:32.8	2 (0+0+1+1)	+6:25.4
67	56	Vassiliy Podkorytov	Kazakhstan	55:06.4	5 (1+1+2+1)	+6:59.0
68	47	Tsukasa Kobonoki	Japan	55:06.9	4 (2+2+0+0)	+6:59.5
69	29	Scott Dixon	Great Britain	55:18.3	2 (0+0+2+0)	+7:10.9
70	98	Ruslan Tkalenko	Ukraine	55:19.5	5 (0+1+1+3)	+7:12.1
71	38	Gheorghe Pop	Romania	55:26.8	3 (1+1+0+1)	+7:19.4
72	31	Alexandr Loginov	Russia	55:35.0	7 (3+2+1+1)	+7:27.6
73	42	Vytautas Strolia	Lithuania	56:00.9	5 (0+2+2+1)	+7:53.5
74	20	Mikito Tachizaki	Japan	56:02.1	5 (2+2+1+0)	+7:54.7
75	34	Daumants Lūsa	Latvia	56:02.8	3 (0+2+0+1)	+7:55.4
76	87	Cornel Puchianu	Romania	56:09.0	5 (1+1+1+2)	+8:01.6
77	28	Thierry Langer	Belgium	56:17.1	4 (0+2+1+1)	+8:09.7
78	54	Remus Faur	Romania	56:33.1	4 (0+1+2+1)	+8:25.7
79	76	Tero Seppälä	Finland	56:35.4	6 (1+2+1+2)	+8:28.0
80	72	Oleksander Zhyrnyi	Ukraine	56:39.5	7 (1+2+3+1)	+8:32.1
81	26	Dimitar Gerdzhikov	Bulgaria	56:52.1	6 (2+0+1+3)	+8:44.7
82	64	Lenart Oblak	Slovenia	57:25.3	4 (1+0+2+1)	+9:17.9
83	45	Kim Jong-min	South Korea	57:27.2	3 (0+0+1+2)	+9:19.8
84	36	Vladislav Vitenko	Kazakhstan	57:35.2	7 (1+2+1+3)	+9:27.8
85	18	Mikko Loukkaanhuhta	Finland	57:40.9	6 (0+0+4+2)	+9:33.5
86	85	Brendan Green	Canada	57:41.3	5 (2+1+0+2)	+9:33.9
87	71	Giuseppe Montello	Italy	57:58.6	6 (3+2+0+1)	+9:51.2
88	2	Klemen Bauer	Slovenia	58:04.1	7 (3+1+1+2)	+9:56.7
89	69	Heo Seon-hoe	South Korea	58:13.9	5 (3+0+1+1)	+10:06.5
90	25	Grzegorz Guzik	Poland	58:19.7	6 (2+1+2+1)	+10:12.3
91	39	Michal Šíma	Slovakia	58:37.7	5 (2+2+0+1 )	+10:30.3
92	43	Apostolos Angelis	Greece	58:52.1	5 (2+2+0+1)	+10:44.7
93	79	Aleksandrs Patrijuks	Latvia	59:25.7	6 (1+1+2+2)	+11:18.3
94	82	Edin Hodžić	Serbia	59:28.7	5 (0+2+2+1)	+11:21.3
95	35	Károly Gombos	Hungary	59:38.4	5 (0+3+1+1)	+11:31.0
96	84	Krešimir Crnković	Croatia	1:00:34.2	10 (3+2+1+4)	+12:26.8
97	30	Filip Petrović	Croatia	1:01:32.6	8 (1+1+3+3)	+13:25.2
98	97	Alexander Starodubets	South Korea	1:02:27.5	8 (2+2+1+3)	+14:20.1
99	52	Alex Gleave	Great Britain	1:04:26.9	8 (1+3+2+1)	+16:19.5
100	65	Dejan Krsmanović	Serbia	1:05:06.5	12 (5+2+2+3)	+16:59.1
—	17	Christian Gow	Canada	DNF	(2+0+0)	
—	53	Damon Morton	Australia	DNS		
