= Biathlon World Championships 2017 – Men's pursuit =

Men's pursuit at the Biathlon World Championships 2017
- Location: Hochfilzen, Austria
- Dates: 12 February
- Competitors: 58 from 24 nations
- Winning time: 30:16.9

Medalists
gold medal	Martin Fourcade	France
silver medal	Johannes Thingnes Bø	Norway
bronze medal	Ole Einar Bjørndalen	Norway

The Men's pursuit competition at the 2017 World Championships was held on 12 February 2017.

== Results ==
The race was started at 15:00.

Rank	Bib	Name	Nationality	Start	Penalties (P+P+S+S)	Time	Deficit
1	3	Martin Fourcade	France	0:23	1 (0+0+0+1)	30:16.9	
2	2	Johannes Thingnes Bø	Norway	0:01	3 (1+1+1+0)	30:39.7	+22.8
3	8	Ole Einar Bjørndalen	Norway	0:38	1 (0+0+0+1)	30:42.5	+25.6
4	21	Anton Shipulin	Russia	1:15	1 (0+1+0+0)	30:50.5	+33.6
5	5	Ondřej Moravec	Czech Republic	0:31	2 (0+0+1+1)	30:50.9	+34.0
6	4	Lowell Bailey	United States	0:30	1 (0+0+1+0)	30:51.6	+34.7
7	6	Krasimir Anev	Bulgaria	0:34	1 (0+0+0+1)	30:55.2	+38.3
8	7	Julian Eberhard	Austria	0:35	3 (1+1+0+1)	31:05.0	+48.1
9	14	Tarjei Bø	Norway	0:50	2 (1+0+0+1)	31:09.2	+52.3
10	9	Simon Schempp	Germany	0:40	3 (0+0+2+1)	31:09.3	+52.4
11	1	Benedikt Doll	Germany	0:00	3 (1+1+1+0)	31:22.0	+1:05.1
12	22	Simon Eder	Austria	1:17	3 (1+1+0+1)	31:50.6	+1:33.7
13	27	Jean-Guillaume Béatrix	France	1:25	1 (1+0+0+0)	31.56:2	+1:39.3
14	28	Dmytro Pidruchnyi	Ukraine	1:26	2 (1+0+1+0)	32:00.1	+1:43.2
15	41	Serhiy Semenov	Ukraine	1:40	1 (0+0+1+0)	32:00.5	+1:43.6
16	33	Klemen Bauer	Slovenia	1:32	2 (0+0+0+2)	32:01.2	+1:44.3
17	30	Fredrik Lindström	Sweden	1:27	1 (1+0+0+0)	32:01.2	+1:44.3
18	13	Vladimir Iliev	Bulgaria	0:48	4 (2+1+1+0)	32:01.6	+1:44.7
19	12	Arnd Peiffer	Germany	0:48	4 (1+0+1+2)	32:03.3	+1:46.4
20	10	Evgeniy Garanichev	Russia	0:45	4 (1+1+1+1)	32:05.8	+1:48.9
21	17	Dominik Landertinger	Austria	1:12	4 (1+0+2+1)	32:06.2	+1:49.3
22	43	Quentin Fillon Maillet	France	1:41	3 (1+2+0+0)	32:14.1	+1:57.2
23	32	Christian Gow	Canada	1:31	1 (0+0+1+0)	32:14.2	+1:57.3
24	47	Martin Otčenáš	Slovakia	1:48	1 (0+0+0+1)	32:14.5	+1:57.6
25	18	Dominik Windisch	Italy	1:12	3 (2+1+0+0)	32:16.4	+1:59.5
26	19	Serafin Wiestner	Switzerland	1:12	3 (2+1+0+0)	32:36.5	+2:19.6
27	35	Simon Desthieux	France	1:34	3 (1+0+0+2)	32:37.2	+2:20.3
28	37	Erik Lesser	Germany	1:36	4 (0+0+2+2)	32:37.9	+2:21.0
29	15	Mario Dolder	Switzerland	1:05	3 (0+1+1+1)	32:42.3	+2:25.4
30	42	Michal Šlesingr	Czech Republic	1:40	3 (0+0+0+3)	32:56.8	+2:39.9
31	51	Daniel Mesotitsch	Austria	1:59	2 (1+0+1+0)	32:59.8	+2:42.9
32	40	Tim Burke	United States	1:39	3 (1+0+1+1)	33:02.3	+2:45.4
33	24	Yan Savitskiy	Kazakhstan	1:22	4 (2+1+0+1)	33:03.1	+2:46.2
34	44	Giuseppe Montello	Italy	1:42	1 (0+1+0+0)	33:06.8	+2:49.9
35	29	Kauri Kõiv	Estonia	1:26	2 (1+0+0+1)	33:10.9	+2:54.0
36	48	Olli Hiidensalo	Finland	1:49	3 (1+0+0+2)	33:19.7	+3:02.8
37	57	Andrejs Rastorgujevs	Latvia	2:08	5 (0+1+2+2)	33:20.1	+3:03.2
38	20	Cornel Puchianu	Romania	1:14	5 (3+0+1+1)	33:20.2	+3:03.3
39	49	Anton Babikov	Russia	1:49	4 (2+1+1+0)	33:21.9	+3:05.0
40	45	Sergey Bocharnikov	Belarus	1:46	3 (0+1+1+1)	33:23.8	+3:06.9
41	31	Tomas Kaukėnas	Lithuania	1:31	4 (0+1+1+2)	33:35.8	+3:18.9
42	23	Remus Faur	Romania	1:19	3 (0+0+2+1)	33:36.7	+3:19.8
43	16	Tomáš Hasilla	Slovakia	1:07	5 (0+1+3+1)	33:54.1	+3:37.2
44	59	Jesper Nelin	Sweden	2:10	4 (2+0+1+1)	33:55.3	+3:38.4
45	58	Oleksander Zhyrnyi	Ukraine	2:10	2 (1+0+0+1)	34:03.5	+3:46.6
46	60	Torstein Stenersen	Sweden	2:21	3 (2+1+0+0)	34:12.7	+3:55.8
47	25	Scott Gow	Canada	1:22	7 (0+3+3+1)	34:12.9	+3:56.0
48	46	Thomas Bormolini	Italy	1:46	3 (0+2+1+0)	34:14.5	+3:57.6
49	26	Leif Nordgren	United States	1:24	5 (2+0+2+1)	34:28.0	+4:11.1
50	50	Michael Rösch	Belgium	1:58	5 (1+1+2+1)	34:28.6	+4:11.7
51	52	Roland Lessing	Estonia	1:59	4 (0+2+1+1)	34:30.5	+4:13.6
52	38	Brendan Green	Canada	1:36	5 (3+1+0+1)	34:36.4	+4:19.5
53	55	Benjamin Weger	Switzerland	2:04	6 (3+3+0+0)	35:03.1	+4:46.2
54	34	Adam Václavík	Czech Republic	1:34	9 (2+3+2+2)	35:10.1	+4:53.2
55	39	Sean Doherty	United States	1:38	9 (2+3+3+1)	35:32.1	+5:15.2
56	54	Vytautas Strolia	Lithuania	2:02	6 (2+2+1+1)	35:47.8	+5:30.9
57	53	Grzegorz Guzik	Poland	2:00	6 (3+1+1+1)	36:08.3	+5:51.4
—	11	Anton Sinapov	Bulgaria	0:48	DNF		
—	36	Emil Hegle Svendsen	Norway	1:34	DNS		
—	56	Lukas Hofer	Italy	2:05	DNS		
