= Biathlon World Championships 2016 – Men's mass start =

Men's mass start at the Biathlon World Championships 2016
- Venue: Oslo, Norway
- Date: 13 March
- Competitors: 30 from 15 nations
- Winning time: 37:05.1

Medalists
gold medal	Johannes Thingnes Bø	Norway
silver medal	Martin Fourcade	France
bronze medal	Ole Einar Bjørndalen	Norway

The Men's mass start event of the Biathlon World Championships 2016 was held on 13 March 2016. 30 athletes will participate over a course of 15 km.

== Results ==
The race was started at 16:00 CET.

Rank	Bib	Name	Nationality	Time	Penalties (P+S+P+S)	Deficit
1st place, gold medalist(s)	8	Johannes Thingnes Bø	Norway	37:05.1	1 (0+0+1+0)	
2nd place, silver medalist(s)	1	Martin Fourcade	France	37:07.9	1 (1+0+0+0)	+2.8
3rd place, bronze medalist(s)	2	Ole Einar Bjørndalen	Norway	37:11.8	0 (0+0+0+0)	+6.7
4	21	Dominik Windisch	Italy	37:24.9	2 (1+0+0+1)	+19.8
5	14	Arnd Peiffer	Germany	37:25.0	1 (1+0+0+0)	+19.9
6	9	Tarjei Bø	Norway	37:26.9	2 (1+1+0+0)	+21.8
7	16	Jakov Fak	Slovenia	37:27.0	1 (0+0+1+0)	+21.9
8	4	Serhiy Semenov	Ukraine	37:36.7	0 (0+0+0+0)	+31.6
9	7	Anton Shipulin	Russia	37:46.1	2 (0+1+0+1)	+41.0
10	27	Lowell Bailey	United States	37:46.8	1 (0+0+0+1)	+41.7
11	6	Simon Eder	Austria	37:58.2	2 (0+0+0+2)	+53.1
12	24	Tim Burke	United States	37:58.5	2 (0+0+1+1)	+ 53.4
13	26	Vladimir Chepelin	Belarus	38:01.2	2 (0+1+1+0)	+56.1
14	15	Erik Lesser	Germany	38:07.9	2 (0+0+0+2)	+1:02.8
15	3	Dominik Landertinger	Austria	38:10.3	3 (2+1+0+0)	+1:05.2
16	28	Anton Babikov	Russia	38:11.4	2 (1+0+0+1)	+1:06.3
17	19	Michal Šlesingr	Czech Republic	38:13.2	3 (1+0+1+1)	+1:08.1
18	13	Benedikt Doll	Germany	38:14.3	3 (0+0+1+2)	+1:09.2
19	10	Simon Schempp	Germany	38:19.3	3 (0+0+1+2)	+1:14.2
20	12	Quentin Fillon Maillet	France	38:26.8	3 (1+0+1+1)	+1:21.7
21	20	Vladimir Iliev	Bulgaria	38:39.4	3 (0+0+1+2)	+1:34.3
22	18	Michal Krčmář	Czech Republic	38:42.1	2 (0+0+1+1)	+1:37.0
23	11	Evgeniy Garanichev	Russia	38:42.5	4 (2+1+0+1)	+1:37.4
24	17	Simon Desthieux	France	39:08.7	3 (0+0+2+1)	+2:03.6
25	25	Krasimir Anev	Bulgaria	39:18.2	3 (0+0+1+2)	+2:13.1
26	30	Andrejs Rastorgujevs	Latvia	39:30.7	3 (1+1+1+0)	+2:25.6
27	23	Serafin Wiestner	Switzerland	40:01.3	4 (2+0+1+1)	+2:56.2
28	5	Emil Hegle Svendsen	Norway	40:42.7	4 (1+0+0+3)	+3:37.6
29	22	Yan Savitskiy	Kazakhstan	41:17.8	6 (0+2+2+2)	+4:12.7
—	29	Leif Nordgren	United States	DNF		
