= Biathlon World Championships 2013 – Men's pursuit =

Men's pursuit at the Biathlon World Championships 2013
- Date: 10 February 2013
- Competitors: 60 from 24 nations
- Winning time: 32:35.5

Medalists
gold medal	Emil Hegle Svendsen	Norway
silver medal	Martin Fourcade	France
bronze medal	Anton Shipulin	Russia

The Men's pursuit event of the Biathlon World Championships 2013 was held on February 10, 2013. The fastest 60 athletes of the sprint competition participated over a course of 12.5 km.

== Results ==
The race was started at 11:00.

Rank	Bib	Name	Nationality	Start	Penalties (P+P+S+S)	Time	Deficit
1st place, gold medalist(s)	1	Emil Hegle Svendsen	Norway	0:00	1 (0+0+0+1)	32:35.5	
2nd place, silver medalist(s)	2	Martin Fourcade	France	0:08	2 (0+1+1+0)	32:35.6	+0.1
3rd place, bronze medalist(s)	7	Anton Shipulin	Russia	0:33	1 (0+0+1+0)	32:39.1	+3.6
4	5	Dmitry Malyshko	Russia	0:23	0 (0+0+0+0)	32:40.9	+5.4
5	15	Dominik Landertinger	Austria	0:58	0 (0+0+0+0)	32:55.9	+20.4
6	3	Jakov Fak	Slovenia	0:11	1 (0+0+0+1)	33:05.2	+29.7
7	8	Fredrik Lindström	Sweden	0:38	1 (0+0+1+0)	33:18.9	+43.4
8	6	Alexis Bœuf	France	0:25	2 (0+0+2+0)	33:22.1	+46.6
9	13	Björn Ferry	Sweden	0:52	0 (0+0+0+0)	33:23.6	+48.1
10	4	Ole Einar Bjørndalen	Norway	0:20	4 (2+0+1+1)	33:27.0	+51.5
11	14	Lukas Hofer	Italy	0:57	2 (0+2+0+0)	33:28.8	+53.3
12	10	Simon Eder	Austria	0:39	3 (0+0+2+1)	33:50.5	+1:15.0
13	32	Lowell Bailey	United States	1:38	0 (0+0+0+0)	33:56.4	+1:20.9
14	12	Erik Lesser	Germany	0:49	4 (1+0+2+1)	34:06.0	+1:30.5
15	36	Jean-Philippe Leguellec	Canada	1:45	1 (0+0+0+1)	34:08.7	+1:33.2
16	9	Evgeny Ustyugov	Russia	0:38	3 (0+1+2+0)	34:16.7	+1:41.2
17	18	Tarjei Bø	Norway	1:14	3 (2+0+1+0)	34:18.9	+1:43.4
18	29	Simon Schempp	Germany	1:36	1 (0+0+0+1)	34:24.4	+1:48.9
19	11	Krasimir Anev	Bulgaria	0:48	2 (0+1+0+1)	34:24.7	+1:49.2
20	37	Henrik L'Abée-Lund	Norway	1:45	1 (0+0+0+1)	34:36.1	+2:00.6
21	16	Arnd Peiffer	Germany	1:08	3 (0+0+2+1)	34:39.8	+2:04.3
22	23	Andreas Birnbacher	Germany	1:25	3 (0+1+1+1)	34:41.7	+2:06.2
23	34	Simon Fourcade	France	1:42	3 (0+3+0+0)	34:51.1	+2:15.6
24	21	Klemen Bauer	Slovenia	1:16	4 (1+0+3+0)	34:55.4	+2:19.9
25	26	Christian De Lorenzi	Italy	1:30	1 (0+0+0+1)	34:57.5	+2:22.0
26	20	Jean-Guillaume Béatrix	France	1:15	4 (0+1+2+1)	34:58.4	+2:22.9
27	33	Daniel Mesotitsch	Austria	1:39	3 (0+0+2+1)	34:58.7	+2:23.2
28	19	Evgeniy Garanichev	Russia	1:14	5 (2+0+2+1)	35:04.2	+2:28.7
29	30	Matej Kazár	Slovakia	1:36	5 (2+1+1+1)	35:04.9	+2:29.4
30	17	Andriy Deryzemlya	Ukraine	1:13	4 (0+0+2+2)	35:05.3	+2:29.8
31	35	Ondřej Moravec	Czech Republic	1:42	3 (0+1+1+1)	35:05.3	+2:48.2
32	28	Tim Burke	United States	1:36	4 (0+1+2+1)	35:33.8	+2:58.3
33	58	Dominik Windisch	Italy	2:31	2 (0+0+1+1)	35:36.4	+3:00.9
34	54	Carl Johan Bergman	Sweden	2:19	2 (0+0+1+1)	35:37.0	+3:01.5
35	25	Benjamin Weger	Switzerland	1:28	3 (0+1+1+1)	36:13.1	+3:37.6
36	42	Artem Pryma	Ukraine	1:59	3 (1+2+0+0)	36:13.2	+3:37.7
37	50	Pavol Hurajt	Slovakia	2:14	2 (0+1+0+1)	36:18.9	+3:43.4
38	22	Tomas Kaukėnas	Lithuania	1:20	4 (0+0+2+2)	36:33.4	+3:57.9
39	43	Vladimir Iliev	Bulgaria	2:03	5 (1+1+2+1)	36:43.4	+4:07.9
40	40	Edgars Piksons	Latvia	1:55	4 (1+0+2+1)	36:49.8	+4:14.3
41	60	Christian Martinelli	Italy	2:36	2 (1+0+0+1)	36:53.0	+4:17.5
42	27	Jaroslav Soukup	Czech Republic	1:32	6 (2+2+2+0)	36:59.8	+4:24.3
43	53	Leif Nordgren	United States	2:19	6 (2+2+2+0)	37:08.3	+4:32.8
44	56	Hidenori Isa	Japan	2:27	2 (0+0+0+2)	37:13.9	+4:38.4
45	41	Serhiy Semenov	Ukraine	1:55	5 (3+1+1+0)	37:14.0	+4:38.5
46	24	Zdeněk Vítek	Czech Republic	1:25	7 (2+2+1+2)	37:21.0	+4:45.5
47	49	Milanko Petrović	Serbia	2:14	6 (2+2+2+0)	37:26.6	+4:51.1
48	31	Kauri Kõiv	Estonia	1:37	6 (2+1+2+1)	37:29.9	+4:54.4
49	47	Yan Savitskiy	Kazakhstan	2:11	5 (2+2+0+1)	37:51.8	+5:16.3
50	45	Scott Gow	Canada	2:06	5 (0+0+1+4)	37:57.4	+5:21.9
51	48	Claudio Böckli	Switzerland	2:13	3 (2+0+0+1)	38:02.8	+5:27.3
52	44	Russell Currier	United States	2:05	7 (3+1+2+1)	38:06.2	+5:30.7
53	57	Vladimir Chepelin	Belarus	2:28	4 (0+1+2+1)	38:06.5	+5:31.0
54	46	Aliaksandr Babchyn	Belarus	2:06	6 (3+2+1+0)	38:19.8	+5:44.3
55	59	Miroslav Matiaško	Slovakia	2:36	6 (3+0+2+1)	38:54.6	+6:19.1
56	38	Jarkko Kauppinen	Finland	1:46	6 (1+1+3+1)	39:06.6	+6:31.1
57	51	Junji Nagai	Japan	2:17	7 (0+2+3+2)	39:49.9	+7:14.4
	55	Stefan Gavrila	Romania	2:25	10 (4+3+3)	LAP	
	39	Serguei Sednev	Ukraine	1:54		DNS	
	52	Michal Šlesingr	Czech Republic	2:18		DNS	
