= Biathlon World Championships 2012 – Men's pursuit =

Men's sprint at the Biathlon World Championships 2012
- Date: 4 March 2012
- Competitors: 56 from 20 nations
- Winning time: 33:39.4

Medalists
gold medal	Martin Fourcade	France
silver medal	Carl Johan Bergman	Sweden
bronze medal	Anton Shipulin	Russia

The men's pursuit competition of the Biathlon World Championships 2012 was held on March 4, 2012 at 13:15 local time.

== Results ==
The race started at 13:15.

Rank	Bib	Name	Country	Start	Penalties (P+P+S+S)	Time	Deficit
1st place, gold medalist(s)	1	Martin Fourcade	France	0:00	4 (1+1+0+2)	33:39.4	
2nd place, silver medalist(s)	3	Carl Johan Bergman	Sweden	0:18	2 (0+1+1+0)	33:44.6	+5.2
3rd place, bronze medalist(s)	13	Anton Shipulin	Russia	1:05	1 (1+0+0+0)	34:01.5	+22.1
4	4	Daniel Mesotitsch	Austria	0:27	2 (0+0+1+1)	34:07.8	+28.4
5	2	Emil Hegle Svendsen	Norway	0:15	4 (1+1+0+2)	34:24.8	+45.4
6	5	Simon Fourcade	France	0:35	3 (1+1+0+1)	34:32.4	+53.0
7	17	Tarjei Bø	Norway	1:13	3 (2+0+0+1)	34:38.7	+59.3
8	11	Jakov Fak	Slovenia	1:01	3 (0+0+1+2)	34:45.6	+1:06.2
9	19	Simon Schempp	Germany	1:14	2 (0+2+0+0)	34:46.1	+1:06.7
10	6	Fredrik Lindström	Sweden	0:36	4 (1+3+0+0)	34:50.9	+1:11.5
11	7	Björn Ferry	Sweden	0:42	3 (1+1+0+1)	35:00.3	+1:20.9
12	16	Andreas Birnbacher	Germany	1:13	3 (0+1+1+1)	35:00.4	+1:21.0
13	31	Lukas Hofer	Italy	1:34	3 (0+2+1+0)	35:06.2	+1:26.8
14	12	Evgeniy Garanichev	Russia	1:04	4 (2+1+0+1)	35:08.6	+1:29.2
15	18	Ondřej Moravec	Czech Republic	1:13	4 (1+2+0+1)	35:15.0	+1:35.6
16	36	Benjamin Weger	Switzerland	1:44	2 (0+1+0+1)	35:22.3	+1:42.9
17	37	Arnd Peiffer	Germany	1:45	3 (1+2+0+0)	35:22.9	+1:43.5
18	9	Alexis Bœuf	France	0:59	4 (0+0+3+1)	35:25.1	+1:45.7
19	33	Andrei Makoveev	Russia	1:43	3 (1+0+1+1)	35:26.4	+1:47.0
20	20	Lowell Bailey	United States	1:15	3 (0+0+1+2)	35:28.2	+1:48.8
21	43	Jaroslav Soukup	Czech Republic	1:57	3 (0+1+2+0)	35:31.2	+1:51.8
22	42	Andriy Deryzemlya	Ukraine	1:57	2 (1+1+0+0)	35:31.2	+1:51.8
23	26	Michael Greis	Germany	1:29	3 (1+0+1+1)	35:31.7	+1:52.3
24	29	Matej Kazár	Slovakia	1:32	3 (0+1+1+1)	35:32.7	+1:53.3
25	23	Sergey Novikov	Belarus	1:20	2 (0+2+0+0)	35:33.9	+1:54.5
26	14	Jean-Philippe Leguellec	Canada	1:10	3 (0+1+0+2)	35:37.9	+1:58.5
27	21	Ole Einar Bjørndalen	Norway	1:16	6 (2+1+2+1)	35:47.7	+2:08.3
28	10	Tim Burke	United States	0:59	5 (1+1+2+1)	35:47.7	+2:08.3
29	25	Michal Šlesingr	Czech Republic	1:28	4 (1+0+1+2)	36:07.1	+2:27.7
30	8	Markus Windisch	Italy	0:46	5 (1+1+1+2)	36:11.2	+2:31.8
31	28	Dominik Landertinger	Austria	1:31	4 (0+0+0+4)	36:14.9	+2:35.5
32	44	Klemen Bauer	Slovenia	1:58	5 (0+1+1+3)	36:15.2	+2:35.8
33	38	Junji Nagai	Japan	1:47	2 (0+0+2+0)	36:19.5	+2:40.1
34	46	Simon Eder	Austria	2:07	2 (0+0+1+1)	36:25.1	+2:45.7
35	15	Dušan Šimočko	Slovakia	1:13	4 (2+0+1+1)	36:29.9	+2:50.5
36	27	Yan Savitskiy	Kazakhstan	1:30	2 (2+0+0+0)	36:29.9	+2:50.5
37	60	Christian de Lorenzi	Italy	2:36	2 (1+1+0+0)	36:34.6	+2:55.2
38	34	Florian Graf	Germany	1:44	4 (2+1+0+1)	36:34.9	+2:55.5
39	58	Roland Lessing	Estonia	2:32	0 (0+0+0+0)	36:38.5	+2:59.1
40	32	Lars Berger	Norway	1:42	6 (0+1+3+2)	36:45.5	+3:06.1
41	24	Simon Hallenbarter	Switzerland	1:21	5 (1+2+1+1)	36:51.2	+3:11.8
42	41	Christoph Sumann	Austria	1:53	2 (1+0+1+0)	36:59.9	+3:20.5
43	45	Nathan Smith	Canada	2:03	5 (0+1+3+1)	37:13.4	+3:34.0
44	35	Artem Pryma	Ukraine	1:44	3 (1+1+0+1)	37:17.0	+3:37.6
45	47	Christian Stebler	Switzerland	2:09	6 (3+0+2+1)	37:26.8	+3:47.4
46	48	Jean-Guillaume Béatrix	France	2:11	5 (0+2+2+1)	37:36.9	+3:57.5
47	51	Kazuya Inomata	Japan	2:19	3 (1+0+2+0)	37:38.9	+3:59.5
48	39	Janez Marič	Slovenia	1:49	6 (1+1+2+2)	37:54.5	+4:15.1
49	22	Serhiy Semenov	Ukraine	1:17	6 (2+0+1+3)	38:01.7	+4:22.3
50	40	Ivan Joller	Switzerland	1:53	4 (0+2+0+2)	38:09.0	+4:29.6
51	54	Tomasz Sikora	Poland	2:21	5 (1+3+0+1)	38:28.4	+4:49.0
52	55	Marc-André Bedard	Canada	2:24	4 (0+1+2+1)	38:35.4	+4:56.0
53	53	Stefan Gavrila	Romania	2:20	3 (0+2+1+0)	38:41.5	+5:02.1
54	50	Scott Perras	Canada	2:14	6 (1+0+2+3)	38:51.8	+5:12.4
55	56	Hidenori Isa	Japan	2:25	5 (2+1+0+2)	39:10.7	+5:31.3
56	59	Kauri Koiv	Estonia	2:34	7 (1+2+1+3)	40:01.5	+6:22.1
—	30	Evgeny Ustyugov	Russia	1:33		DNS	
—	49	Michail Kletcherov	Bulgaria	2:13		DNS	
—	52	Krasimir Anev	Bulgaria	2:20		DNS	
—	57	Vladimir Iliev	Bulgaria	2:28		DNS	
