= Martin Fourcade =

French retired biathlete and military officer (born 1988)

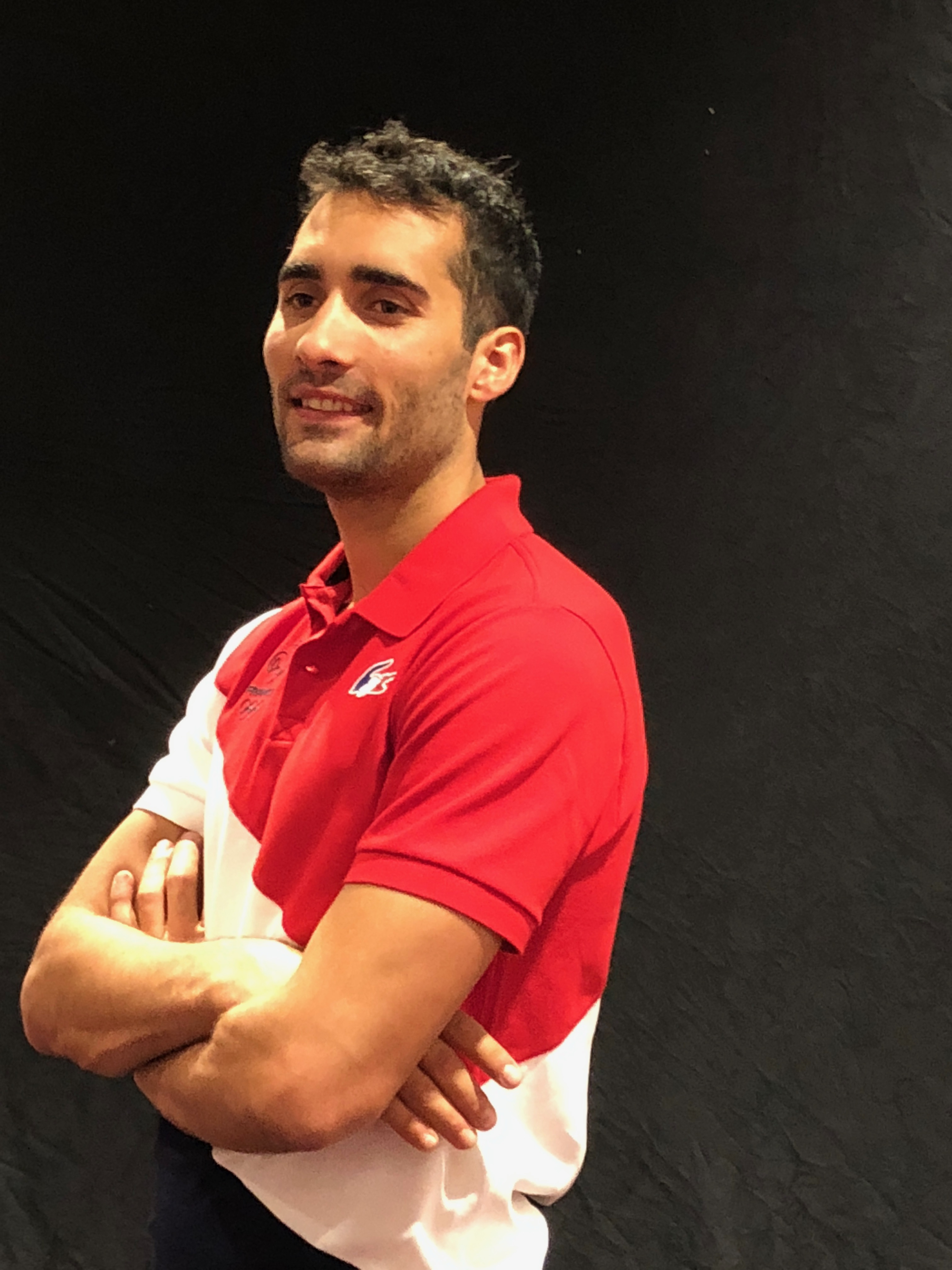
- Fourcade in 2017

Personal information
- Nationality: French
- Born: 14 September 1988 (age 38) Céret, France
- Height: 1.85 m (6 ft 1 in)
- Website: martinfourcade.fr

Sport

Professional information
- Sport: Biathlon
- Club: EMHM Nordic 66
- World Cup debut: 13 March 2008
- Retired: 14 March 2020

Olympic Games
- Teams: 3 (2010, 2014, 2018)
- Medals: 7 (6 gold)

World Championships
- Teams: 10 (2009–2020)
- Medals: 28 (13 gold)

World Cup
- Seasons: 13 (2008 – 2020)
- Individual races: 283
- All races: 347
- Individual victories: 84
- All victories: 98
- Individual podiums: 150
- All podiums: 186
- Overall titles: 7 (2011–12, 2012–13, 2013–14, 2014–15, 2015–16, 2016–17, 2017–18)
- Discipline titles: 26: 5 Individual (2012–13, 2015–16, 2016–17, 2017–18, 2019-20); 8 Sprint (2011–12, 2012–13, 2013–14, 2014–15, 2015–16, 2016–17, 2017–18, 2019-20); 8 Pursuit (2009–10, 2011–12, 2012–13, 2013–14, 2014–15, 2015–16, 2016–17, 2017–18); 5 Mass start (2012–13, 2013–14, 2015–16, 2016–17, 2017–18)
Medal record
Representing France
Event	1st	2nd	3rd
Olympic Games	6	1	0
World Championships	13	10	5
Total	19	11	5
Olympic Games
Gold medal – first place	2010 Vancouver	15 km mass start
Gold medal – first place	2014 Sochi	12.5 km pursuit
Gold medal – first place	2014 Sochi	20 km individual
Gold medal – first place	2018 Pyeongchang	12.5 km pursuit
Gold medal – first place	2018 Pyeongchang	15 km mass start
Gold medal – first place	2018 Pyeongchang	Mixed relay
Silver medal – second place	2014 Sochi	15 km mass start
World Championships
Gold medal – first place	2011 Khanty-Mansiysk	12.5 km pursuit
Gold medal – first place	2012 Ruhpolding	10 km sprint
Gold medal – first place	2012 Ruhpolding	12.5 km pursuit
Gold medal – first place	2012 Ruhpolding	15 km mass start
Gold medal – first place	2013 Nové Město	20 km individual
Gold medal – first place	2015 Kontiolahti	20 km individual
Gold medal – first place	2016 Oslo	10 km sprint
Gold medal – first place	2016 Oslo	12.5 km pursuit
Gold medal – first place	2016 Oslo	20 km individual
Gold medal – first place	2016 Oslo	Mixed relay
Gold medal – first place	2017 Hochfilzen	12.5 km pursuit
Gold medal – first place	2020 Antholz	20 km individual
Gold medal – first place	2020 Antholz	4 × 7.5 km relay
Silver medal – second place	2011 Khanty-Mansiysk	10 km sprint
Silver medal – second place	2012 Ruhpolding	4 × 7.5 km relay
Silver medal – second place	2013 Nové Město	10 km sprint
Silver medal – second place	2013 Nové Město	12.5 km pursuit
Silver medal – second place	2013 Nové Město	4 × 7.5 km relay
Silver medal – second place	2013 Nové Město	Mixed relay
Silver medal – second place	2015 Kontiolahti	Mixed relay
Silver medal – second place	2016 Oslo	15 km mass start
Silver medal – second place	2017 Hochfilzen	4 × 7.5 km relay
Silver medal – second place	2017 Hochfilzen	Mixed relay
Bronze medal – third place	2011 Khanty-Mansiysk	Mixed relay
Bronze medal – third place	2015 Kontiolahti	4 × 7.5 km relay
Bronze medal – third place	2017 Hochfilzen	10 km sprint
Bronze medal – third place	2017 Hochfilzen	20 km individual
Bronze medal – third place	2020 Antholz	10 km sprint
Youth World Championships
Bronze medal – third place	2007 Martell	3 × 7.5 km relay

Martin Fourcade (French pronunciation: [maʁtɛ̃ fuʁkad]; born 14 September 1988) is a French retired biathlete and military officer. He is a six-time Olympic champion, a thirteen-time World Champion and a seven-time winner of the Overall World Cup. As of February 2026, he is the second most successful French Winter Olympian of all time after Quentin Fillon Maillet. Fourcade is the all-time biathlon record holder of overall World Cup titles with seven big crystal globes and he's also the all-time record holder of the most consecutive Major Championships titles with at least one non-team gold medal in every major championship from 2011 to 2018.

On 13 March 2020, he announced his retirement following the 2019–2020 season. Since April 2018, he serves as president of the Athletes' Commission of the organising committee for the 2024 Olympic and Paralympic Games in Paris, France. In February 2022 Fourcade was elected to serve eight-year terms as a member of both the International Olympic Committee and the IOC Athletes' Commission.

Fourcade is an officer of the French Army. He graduated from the High Mountain Military School in Chamonix in 2014. In 2017 he was made a sous-lieutenant.

== Career ==
This article uses the phrase "non-team" when referring to individual competitions to avoid mixing up one of the biathlon disciplines, the individual discipline and individual competitions in general.

=== Early career ===
Fourcade took up biathlon in 2002 and started competing internationally in 2006, following in the footsteps of his older brother Simon Fourcade. The younger Fourcade competed for France in the 2007 and 2008 Junior World Championships, winning a bronze medal in the relay in 2007.

Fourcade first competed in the Biathlon World Cup at Oslo in March 2008, finishing 61st in what would be his only World Cup appearance that season. The next season was already much more successful for him, as he grabbed his first World Cup points at Hochfilzen, placing 36th in the individual race and 10th in the sprint. His best results that year came at the 2009 World Championships, where he finished in the top 20 in every competition, including an 8th place in the pursuit and a 4th place in the relay. Fourcade finished 24th in the overall World Cup that year.

=== 2009–10 season: First wins and first discipline World Cup title, First Olympic gold ===
2009–10 World Cup season results
No.	World Cup location	Individual	Sprint	Pursuit	Mass start	Relay	Mixed relay
1	Östersund, Sweden	7	8	—	—	1	—
2	Hochfilzen, Austria	—	12	14	—	4	—
3	Pokljuka, Slovenia	DNS	DNS	DNS	—	—	—
4	Oberhof, Germany	—	84	—	21	2	—
5	Ruhpolding, Germany	—	6	—	5	DNS	—
6	Antholz-Anterselva, Italy	8	6	4	—	—	—
Biathlon at the 2010 Winter Olympics	Vancouver, Canada	14	35	34	1	6	—
7	Kontiolahti, Finland	—	3	1	—	—	DNS
8	Oslo, Norway	—	1	1	21	—	—
9	Khanty-Mansiysk, Russia	—	DNF	—	6	—	—
WCH	Khanty-Mansiysk, Russia	—	—	—	—	—	5
Key:"—" denotes discipline not held; DNS—Did not start; DNF—Did not finish.

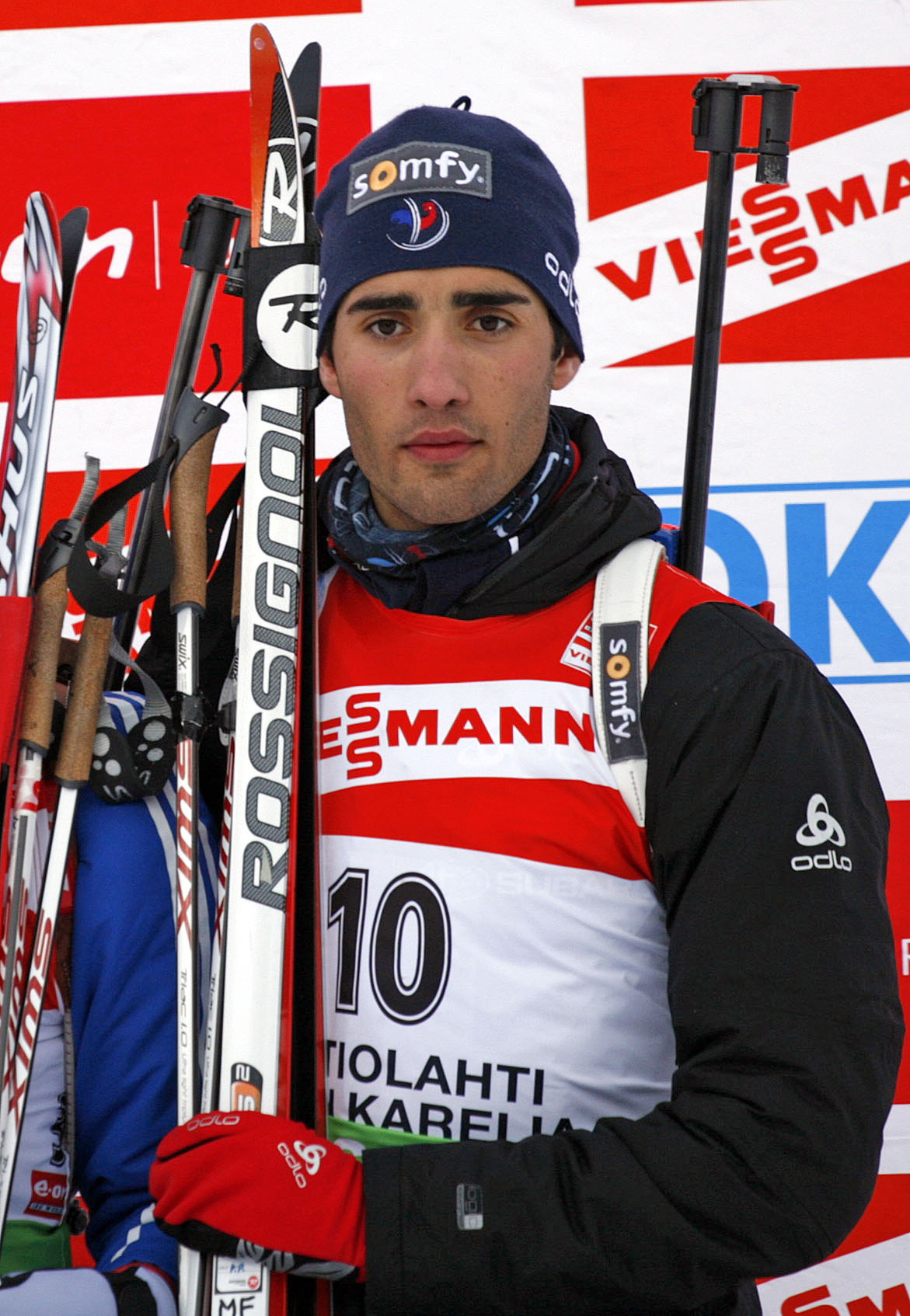
Fourcade in Kontiolahti, Finland on 13 March 2010

Fourcade again improved in the 2009–10 season, consistently finishing in the top 10 and making the French team for the 2010 Winter Olympics, together with his brother. Fourcade grabbed a gold medal in the mass start, marking his first Olympic medal and the first time he made the podium in a World Cup event. Fourcade then claimed his first victory in a pursuit at Kontiolahti, and followed up with two more first places at Oslo, in a sprint and another pursuit. The two pursuit victories meant Fourcade won the 2009–10 Pursuit World Cup, edging out Austria's Simon Eder by just one point. In the overall World Cup he finished 5th, 64 points ahead of his brother Simon, who finished a career-best 7th.

=== 2010–11 season: First World Championship title, first overall World Cup podium ===
2010–11 World Cup season results
No.	World Cup location	Individual	Sprint	Pursuit	Mass start	Relay	Mixed relay
1	Östersund, Sweden	3	3	5	—	—	—
2	Hochfilzen, Austria	—	38	13	—	3	—
3	Pokljuka, Slovenia	DNF	16	—	—	—	3
4	Oberhof, Germany	—	68	—	4	6	—
5	Ruhpolding, Germany	2	2	2	—	—	—
6	Antholz-Anterselva, Italy	—	21	—	1	7	—
7	Presque Isle, United States	—	2	7	—	—	DNS
8	Fort Kent, United States	—	4	2	1	—	—
WCH	Khanty-Mansiysk, Russia	10	2	1	10	12	3
9	Oslo, Norway	—	35	3	7	—	—
Key:"—" denotes discipline not held; DNS—Did not start; DNF—Did not finish.

The 2010–11 season was also highly successful for Fourcade. He opened the season at Östersund with three top 5 finishes, including two 3rd places. After somewhat weaker showings at Pokljuka and Oberhof, Fourcade placed runner-up in all three races at Ruhpolding. Fourcade won mass starts at both Antholz and Fort Kent, and entered the 2011 World Championships in Khanty-Mansiysk, Russia as one of the favourites.

The first event at the World Championships was the mixed relay, where the French placed 3rd after Fourcade as anchor showed the best male performance in the race to lift his team up from 5th. Fourcade then claimed the silver medal behind Arnd Peiffer in the sprint, despite missing two shots at the prone stage; Fourcade was the fastest skier in the competition. The next day in the pursuit Fourcade won the gold despite three penalties, thanks to turning in another fastest skiing performance.

Fourcade finished 3rd in the Overall World Cup, 4th in the Sprint, 2nd in the Pursuit, 3rd in the Individual and 2nd in the Mass Start.

=== 2011–12 season: First overall World Cup title, three World Championships golds ===
2011–12 World Cup season results
No.	World Cup location	Individual	Sprint	Pursuit	Mass start	Relay	Mixed relay
1	Östersund, Sweden	1	4	1	—	—	—
2	Hochfilzen, Austria	—	22	24	—	3	—
3	Hochfilzen, Austria	—	2	7	—	—	DNS
4	Oberhof, Germany	—	DNS	—	13	7	—
5	Nové Město, Czech Republic	10	3	2	—	—	—
6	Antholz-Anterselva, Italy	—	3	—	3	1	—
7	Oslo, Norway	—	10	4	5	—	—
8	Kontiolahti, Finland	—	1	2	—	—	DNS
WCH	Ruhpolding, Germany	25	1	1	1	2	11
9	Khanty-Mansiysk, Russia	—	1	1	15	—	—
Key:"—" denotes discipline not held; DNS—Did not start; DNF—Did not finish.

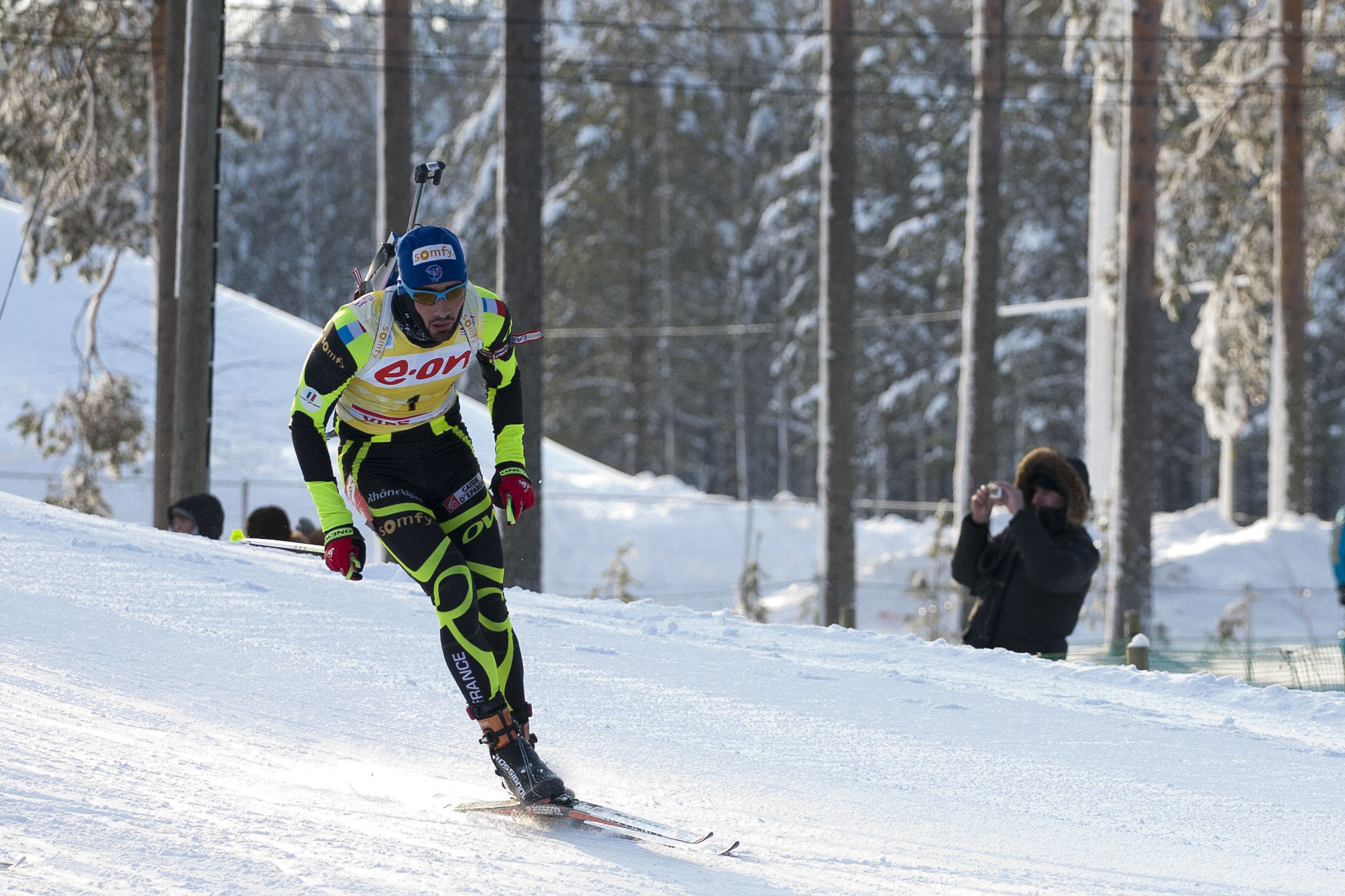
Fourcade in Kontiolahti, Finland on 12 February 2012

Fourcade had the best possible start in 2011–12 season with 2 wins in the individual and the pursuit in Östersund, Sweden, leading the Overall ranking for the first time.

In Nové Město, Czech Republic, he finished 3rd in the sprint, alongside his older brother Simon who took the 2nd place, behind Norway's Emil Hegle Svendsen. It was the first time in biathlon's history that 2 brothers stood on a podium together. In the following pursuit (although finishing respectively 2nd and 3rd) Simon was downgraded to 4th place after IBU decided to upgrade Germany's Arnd Peiffer following a target's malfunction (Peiffer did an extra lap). But the French team claimed Martin had purposely slowed down before crossing the line, seeing that Simon was far behind. IBU finally decided to tie Peiffer and Martin.

Antholz was a fantastic weekend for the French team, both men and women relays taking 1st place and Fourcade finishing 3rd of the sprint and the mass Start.

On home soil in Oslo, Emil Hegle Svendsen grabbed the yellow bib from Fourcade.

The first to start, Fourcade managed to win the sprint despite extreme temperatures in Kontiolahti, Finland (−18 °C).

At the World Championships in Ruhpolding, Fourcade won three gold medals in sprint, pursuit and mass start. He became only the third male biathlete to win three non-team gold medals at a single World Championships after Raphaël Poirée (Oberhof 2004) and Ole Einar Bjørndalen (Hochfilzen 2005 and Pyeongchang 2009).

Fourcade won the overall World Cup for the first time, as well as the discipline titles in the sprint and the pursuit.

=== 2012–13 season: Overwhelming overall World Cup title, a World Championship gold and five medals ===
2012–13 World Cup season results
No.	World Cup location	Individual	Sprint	Pursuit	Mass start	Relay	Mixed relay
1	Östersund, Sweden	1	10	1	—	—	DNS
2	Hochfilzen, Austria	—	2	3	—	2	—
3	Pokljuka, Slovenia	—	3	3	4	—	—
4	Oberhof, Germany	—	16	14	—	DNS	—
5	Ruhpolding, Germany	—	1	—	1	1	—
6	Antholz-Anterselva, Italy	—	6	4	—	1	—
WCH	Nové Město, Czech Republic	1	2	2	10	2	2
7	Oslo, Norway	—	2	1	2	—	—
8	Sochi, Russia	1	1	—	—	DNS	—
9	Khanty-Mansiysk, Russia	—	1	3	1	—	—
Key:"—" denotes discipline not held; DNS—Did not start; DNF—Did not finish.

Fourcade started the 2012–13 season with a win in the individual in Östersund. At the time he had improved his shooting to 89%.

In Hochfilzen, Fourcade finished 2nd and 3rd in the sprint and in the pursuit, respectively.

Having had mediocre weekends in Pokljuka and Oberhof, Fourcade went on to win both the sprint and the mass start in Ruhpolding.

At the World Championships in Nové Město, Fourcade had to settle for silver both in sprint and in pursuit as Emil Hegle Svendsen won both events. In the latter, Fourcade lost the gold by one tenth of a second to Svendsen, leaving the Frenchman disappointed, citing that he would "think of that 2,4 cm everyday when training next summer". Fourcade was, however, able to take a gold in the individual, his fifth World Championships gold medal.

The end of the season was a successful one for Fourcade, as he picked up wins in the pursuit in Oslo, in the individual and in the sprint in Sochi and in the sprint and in the mass start in Khanty-Mansiysk.

Fourcade finished the season with over 400 overall world cup points more than Svendsen who finished second, thus winning his second overall World Cup title. In addition, he won all of discipline titles, becoming only the second male biathlete after Raphaël Poirée to win all of the crystal globes in one season.

=== 2013–14 season: Olympic golds and a silver, third overall World Cup title in a row ===
Just like in the previous season, Fourcade started the 2013–14 season by winning the Östersund individual. In addition, he won the sprint two days later. He then went on to take a third win of the season in Hochfilzen pursuit. Fourcade couldn't, however, add to his win count in Annecy, France, his best result being third in the sprint.

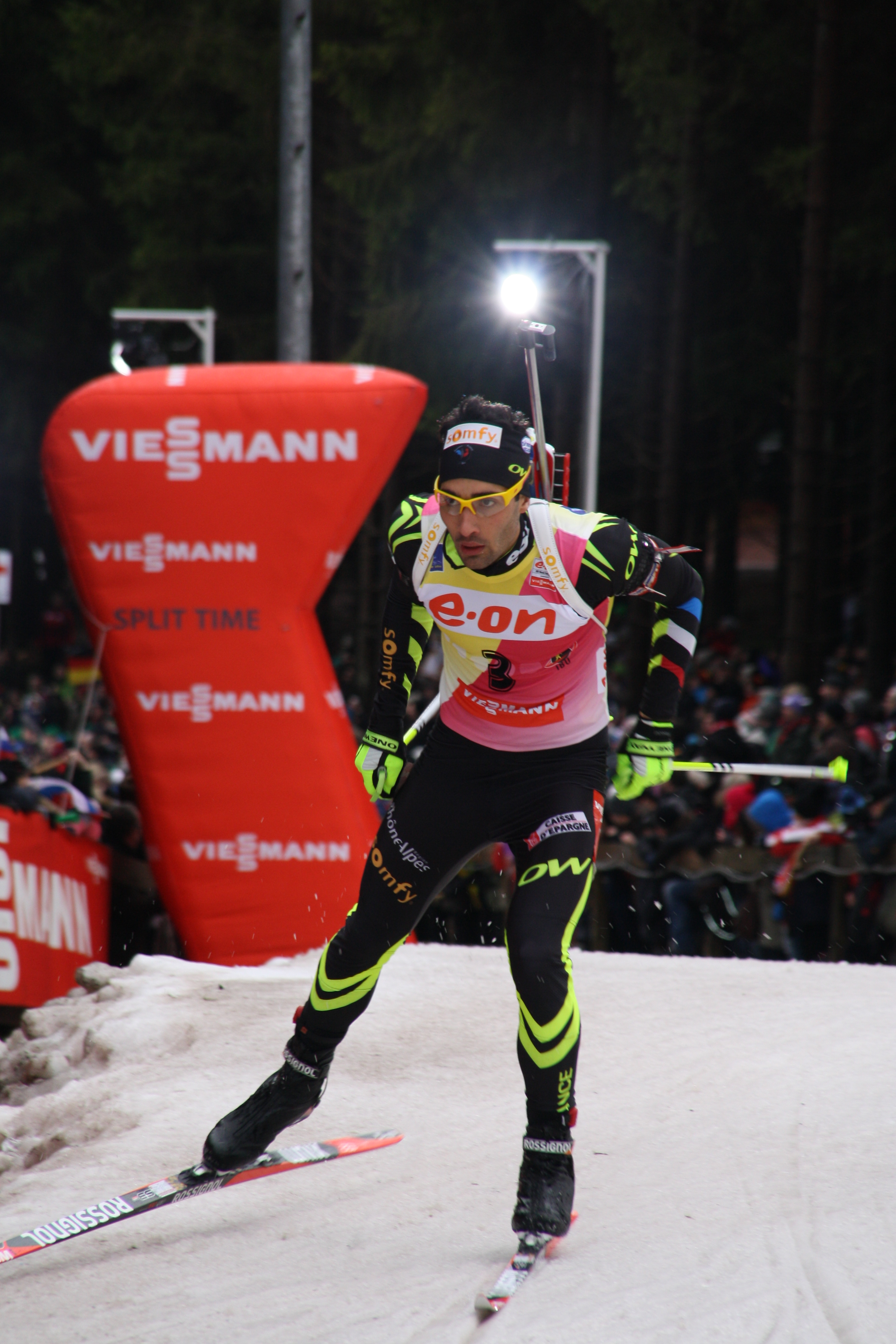
Martin Fourcade in Oberhof in January 2014

At the start of the year 2014 Fourcade won the mass start in Oberhof, his first World Cup victory there. He then decided to skip the Ruhpolding weekend to train for the olympics. His final tune-up for the olympics, the Antholz World Cup weekend wasn't all that successful, although the French team, anchored by Martin Fourcade, did win the men's relay.

Ahead of the 2014 Winter Olympics in Sochi Fourcade admitted that he will be under pressure, but that he will be able to handle it. He also said that he is capable of winning every race he enters but that there will be others, mainly Emil Hegle Svendsen, with a great level of self-confidence. The first non-team race, the sprint, ended in disappointing sixth place for Fourcade. However, he was able to turn the tables in the following pursuit, climbing from sixth to first, winning his first olympic gold medal. After the last shot at the last standing shooting Fourcade famously stretched his arm in the air and pumped his fist, explaining that it was all happiness, knowing the weight of that shooting. In the individual, Fourcade carried on his good form, hitting 19 out of 20 targets in winning his second olympic gold medal. The mass-start ended in a slight disappointment for Fourcade, for even though claiming his third medal of the games, a silver, he lost the gold by some centimeters, Svendsen claiming the victory in photo-finish. Regardless of that, Fourcade was by far the most successful male biathlete of the 2014 Winter Olympics. In addition, he became only the second male biathlete after Ole Einar Bjørndalen to have won a non-team Olympic gold medal, a non-team World Championships gold medal, the Overall World Cup title and all of the discipline World Cup titles in his career.

After the olympics there were three weekends left in the world cup, with Fourcade claiming the second place in the Pokljuka mass start, and second places in the Kontiolahti sprint and pursuit (Johannes Thingnes Bø winning both of the Kontiolahti races). With the pursuit second place, Fourcade secured his third overall World Cup title.

Fourcade won the final event of the season, the Oslo mass start, which ensured that he won the mass start crystal globe. He finished the season with the Overall crystal globe as well as sprint, pursuit and mass start crystal globes.

=== 2014–15 season: Historic fourth overall World Cup title in a row, a World Championship gold and medals ===
Before the 2014–15 season Fourcade suffered from mononucleosis and was forced to heavily cut back his training hours in the summer.

Unlike the two previous years, Fourcade couldn't win the Östersund individual, in fact with six shooting errors he slumped to 81st place, his second worst World Cup result ever. This appeared to be only temporary, however, as he won both of the following races, the sprint and the pursuit.

His next victory came in the Hochfilzen pursuit where he climbed from seventh place to first, thanks to a clean shooting. Pokljuka was not as successful, as Fourcade didn't add to his win tally. Even so, he collected second most points of the weekend behind Anton Shipulin of Russia.

During the Oberhof weekend at the start of the year 2015, the French star won both the sprint and the mass start. Some say the final shooting of the mass start was one of the most memorable moments of the season as a strong wind forced the leading Fourcade to wait patiently for it to calm down while many athletes, including eventual runner-up Anton Shipulin, left the shooting range. None of them shot clean, however, and it was the clean shooting Fourcade who again took the lead and the victory.

After two below par -weekends, when Shipulin and most notably Simon Schempp of Germany were able to reduce the gap to Fourcade in the Overall World Cup, the Frenchman was able to regroup to score fourth and third places in Nové Město sprint and pursuit, respectively.

The last weekend before the world championships, the Oslo weekend, saw Fourcade complete the return to form, as the Frenchman won the individual race. He started first, shot 20 out of 20 and stayed on top until the end. Fourcade then went on to take the second place behind Arnd Peiffer in the sprint.

At the World Championships in Kontiolahti, Fourcade didn't medal in the three other non-team events, but won his sixth world championships gold medal in the individual. Having made one shooting error on the second prone stage he had to play catch up, as his rival Emil Hegle Svendsen had cleared all the targets earlier. Fourcade didn't make any more shooting mistakes and overtook Svendsen at the finish to take the gold. If it hadn't been for the late success of eventual bronze medalist Ondrej Moravec, the elder of the Fourcade brothers, Simon, would have been on the podium as well. By claiming his sixth non-team gold, Martin Fourcade became the third most successful non-team gold medal-winning male biathlete at the World Championships after Ole Einar Bjørndalen and Raphaël Poirée, and moved ahead of his rival Svendsen, Alexander Tikhonov and Frank Ullrich who all stand at five non-team gold medals.

At the season finale in Khanty-Mansiysk, Fourcade claimed a victory in the sprint, his 8th win of the season. He then finished 4th in the pursuit, which was enough to secure the big crystal globe, as well as the pursuit discipline title.

Despite the off season mononucleosis, Fourcade finished the season winning the Overall World Cup title and the sprint and pursuit discipline titles. He became the first male biathlete to win the Overall title four times in succession.

=== 2015–16 season: Overall World Cup title and all of the discipline titles, World Championship success ===
Before starting his biathlon campaign for 2015–16, Fourcade had a brief foray into cross-country skiing, finishing 12th in a 15 km freestyle FIS race at Beitostølen before competing in the opening meeting of the 2015–16 FIS Cross-Country World Cup at Ruka, where he finished 22nd in the 10 km freestyle, posting the third best French performance of the day, and beating his previous personal best result on the Cross-Country World Cup of a 47th place in 2012.

Like the year before, Fourcade started the biathlon season with an indifferent showing in the Östersund individual. And like the previous year, he was able to regroup to win both of the two other solo Östersund races, the sprint and the pursuit. He missed five times in the two competitions altogether, but was still able to win both races quite comfortably with his outstanding ski speed.

In Hochfilzen, Fourcade and Simon Schempp dominated the field, with Schempp winning the sprint and Fourcade finishing second and the two swapping places in the following pursuit. The Pokljuka weekend was a good but not a great one for Fourcade, as he collected third most world cup points there. Schempp was, however, able to gain on the lead of Fourcade quite considerably.

With world number two Bjørndalen and world number three Schempp absent from the first two and all three Oberhof-replacing Ruhpolding races, respectively, Fourcade was able to take a sizeable lead in the overall rankings. After the first of the two Ruhpolding weekends, a familiar threat in Emil Hegle Svendsen took over as the nearest challenger to Fourcade in the overall rankings. However, Fourcade was able to take a big lead in the final race of the weekend, the mass start. The two great rivals arrived toe to toe at the final standing shoot, only for Fourcade to hit all five targets and win the race and Svendsen to miss three times and fall to the 13th place.

Fourcade then carried on the good form by winning the Ruhpolding individual race and placing second in the mass start. The next weekend, the Antholz weekend was a poor one for Fourcade, although he did rise from 28th place to fourth in the pursuit.

The trip to North America started very well for Fourcade, as he won the Canmore sprint. He also took the Canmore single mixed relay with Marie Dorin Habert. In the Presque Isle sprint, Fourcade finished third behind Johannes Thingnes Bø and Anton Shipulin. In the following pursuit, Bø seemed to be on his way to winning a double before missing twice on the last shooting. Fourcade, some 40 seconds back, cleared all five targets and left the range before his Norwegian rival. By claiming the pursuit, Fourcade equalled the number of world cup race wins of Raphaël Poirée, with 44 victories. The race also marked the 100th time Fourcade wore the prestigious yellow bib.

To prepare for the 2016 World Championships in Oslo, Fourcade bought an apartment in Oslo with the help of his friend Tarjei Bø in June 2015. Judging by his success in the championships, this seemed to be a good move. Fourcade started by anchoring the French mixed relay team to a gold medal before winning both the sprint and the pursuit in convincing fashion. With these gold medals, Fourcade secured his fifth straight Overall World Cup title and brought his number of World Championship gold medals to nine. He then went on to keep the golden streak going by winning the individual race. Fourcade had a one-minute penalty at the first standing stage but, as in the three previous major individual races, this proved to be his only mistake of the race. That turned out to be just enough to beat clean-shooting Dominik Landertinger of Austria. By claiming his tenth World Championship gold medal and ninth non-team gold medal, Fourcade became the first biathlete ever to win the longest event in biathlon three times in succession at the World Championships. In addition, Fourcade claimed the individual discipline crystal globe with a margin of two points over bronze medallist Simon Eder of Austria, leaving the great Frenchman all but certain to win all of the crystal globes that season. The final race of the championships, the mass start, saw Fourcade narrowly miss the chance to win all four non-team gold medals as Johannes Thingnes Bø edged the Frenchman on the last loop. With his non-team medals, Fourcade became only the second male biathlete to win three golds and one silver in non-team competitions in a single World Championships, after Raphaël Poirée (Oberhof 2004). And by claiming three non-team gold medals to take his career tally to 9, Fourcade became the second most successful non-team gold medal-winning male biathlete at the World Championships after Ole Einar Bjørndalen.

Fourcade finished the season winning the overall World Cup title as well as all of the discipline titles, becoming the first male biathlete to win all five crystal globes of a season multiple times. The overall title was his fifth in succession.

=== 2016–17 season: Sixth overall World Cup title in a row, a World Championship gold and medals ===
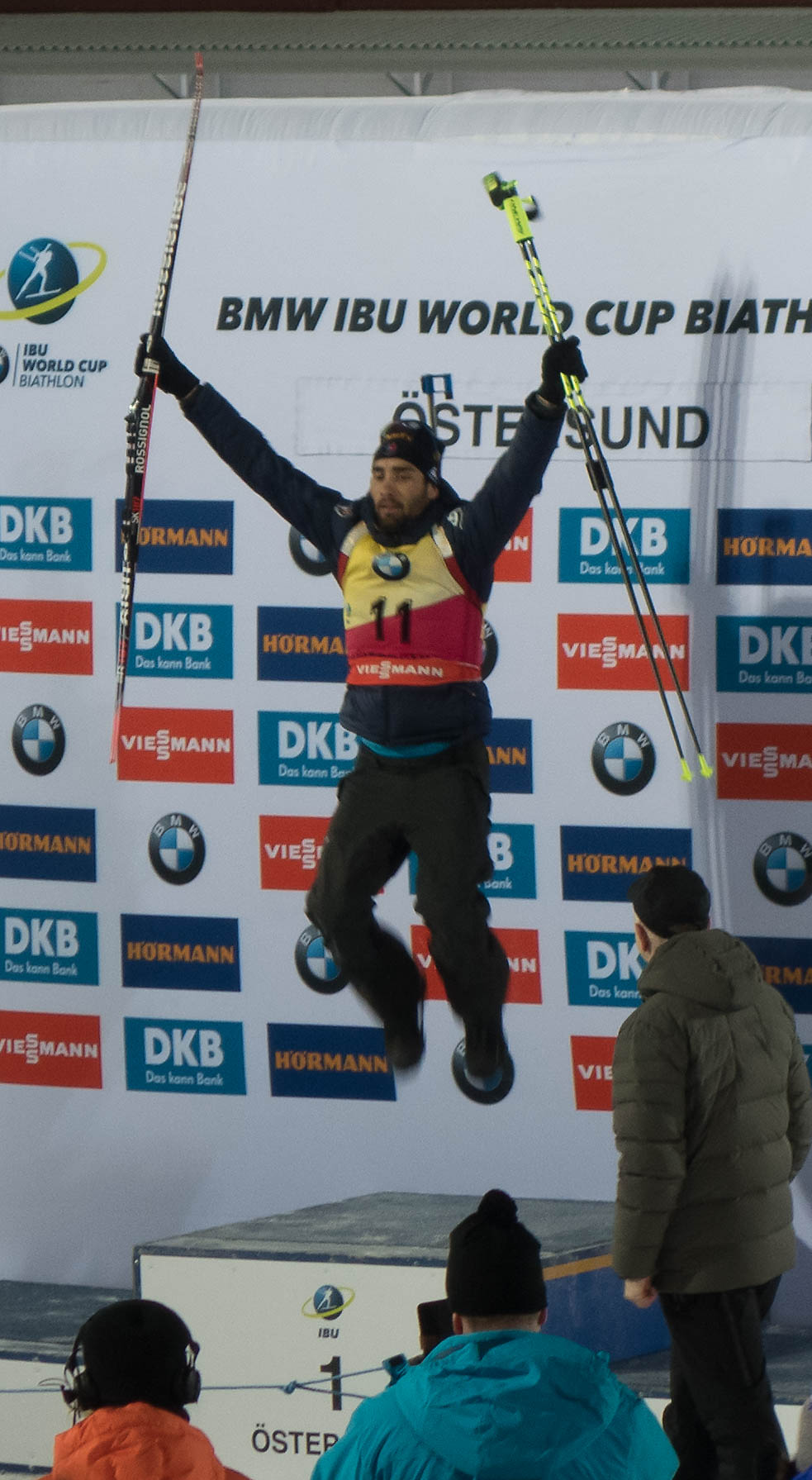
Fourcade victorious again in Östersund

Yet again the first competition weekend of the season in Östersund proved to be a successful one for Fourcade. He started the campaign with a convincing victory in the mixed relay with Marie Dorin Habert. Fourcade then won the individual race, the first non-team race of the season, despite two missed shots at the first standing stage. He hit all the remaining targets while Johannes Thingnes Bø, who had a comfortable lead coming to the last shooting, fell victim to nerves and a strong wind and missed two targets. This allowed fast-skiing Fourcade to take the victory. The sprint was a dominant race for Fourcade, who missed no targets and outskied everyone else. Fourcade couldn't, however, complete the Östersund clean sweep, as he surprisingly let go a 42-second lead in the pursuit. He suffered from a combination of nerves and wind to miss four targets altogether as he was beaten by the surprise pair of the season, Anton Babikov and Maxim Tsvetkov of Russia. The third place ensured, however, that Fourcade would take a sizeable lead in the world cup total points from the first weekend.

Fourcade continued his domination in Pokljuka, winning all three competitions of the weekend. He overtook a fellow clean-shooter Johannes Thingnes Bø in the sprint with a strong last loop. This ensured that Fourcade now had at least one victory at every World Cup venue in the current calendar. In the pursuit, Fourcade shot clean all stages and left Anton Shipulin, who had arrived at the last standing just after Fourcade, third behind Emil Hegle Svendsen. Fourcade then anchored the French team to victory in the relay, having had a 20-second head start thanks to three good legs from Jean Guillaume Beatrix, Quentin Fillon Maillet and Simon Desthieux.

For the second weekend in a row, Fourcade won all three competitions of the weekend, this time in Nové Město. He won the sprint with a margin of 1,6 seconds with one penalty, outskiing the clean-shooting Anton Shipulin. Fourcade then shot a single penalty in a convincing pursuit victory and wrapped up the weekend with another 19 out of 20 targets -mass start competition, claiming his 7th non-team victory of the season. By winning 7 of the 8 non-team competitions, placing third in the remaining one and winning both relay competitions, Fourcade had the most successful December in biathlon history.

The first race after the Christmas break was the Oberhof sprint, where Fourcade had the lead coming to the second shooting, but couldn't manage the tough winds and missed three targets. He finished eighth, his worst result of the season, thus ending the streak of 10 podium finishes and 8 non-team podium finishes. However, Fourcade was able to turn the tables in the following pursuit. He hit 19 out of 20 targets in difficult conditions and climbed from 51 seconds back of Julian Eberhard to win with a margin of over a minute to Arnd Peiffer. With this win, Fourcade secured having at least one victory from every competition weekend of the season. In the mass start, Fourcade missed twice and finished third behind Germans Simon Schempp and Erik Lesser, despite leading after the last shooting. This was the 10th podium out of 11 races of the season for Fourcade.

Fourcade continued to amass victories and World Cup lead in Ruhpolding. He outskied Julian Eberhard and Emil Hegle Svendsen in the sprint, all three of them shooting clean. In the following pursuit, Eberhard dropped out of the fight for victory earlier on, but Svendsen got close to Fourcade. This was because the Frenchman missed three times in the second and third shooting combined. Before the last shooting, Svendsen had the lead for a moment and a number of other athletes caught them as well. But from there on, Fourcade opened up a lead, held his nerve and technique to shoot clean, and easily held his lead in the final lap.

Competition weekend number 6 in Antholtz in the typically challenging venue for Fourcade again proved to be just that. He finished second in the individual, behind Anton Shipulin, shooting two mistakes as the Russian only shot one. This was podium number 13 out of 14 non-team competitions for Fourcade. He then skipped the relay to prepare for the mass start. He couldn't, however, reach the podium this time as three missed shots left him fifth, thus ending his five-weekend streak of at least one victory and at least one non-team victory.

Before and during the first part of the World Championships in Hochfilzen, Fourcade had a brief argument with the Russian biathlon team regarding a tweet by Fourcade about the length of the doping ban of Alexandr Loginov. Fourcade didn't appear to let that harm his concentration however, as he started by shooting clean in the mixed relay and anchoring the French team to silver. He then failed to add to his non-team gold medal tally in the sprint, but was still positively surprised to grab the bronze medal after missing one shot at both shootings. Later starters Benedikt Doll of Germany and Johannes Thingnes Bø shot clean and beat the Frenchman. Fourcade didn't have to wait for the World Championships gold number 11 and non-team gold number 10 for long though, as the following pursuit ended in convincing fashion, with the Frenchman overtaking Doll and Bø already after the first shooting. He never gave the lead away after that, only missed his very last shot and won with a healthy margin. This ensured that Fourcade now stood alone as the record holder for consecutive Major Championships and consecutive World Championships with at least one non-team gold medal. Fourcade had a four Major Championships gold streak in the individual race, but found it hard to defend his title this time. He started early and missed his first shot at both prone shootings. This opened the door for many late starters but a while it seemed that the most successful individual racer of all time had after all done enough. However, Ondrej Moravec of the Czech Republic and Lowell Bailey of the USA shot 20 out of 20 and finished ahead of Fourcade, with Bailey taking the surprise gold. But just like in the sprint, Fourcade was satisfied having yet again medalled and added to his impressive tally of World Cup podiums despite the two missed shots. Fourcade then anchored the French relay team to silver, having also started second. The final race of the championships, the mass start, was a slight disappointment for Fourcade. He arrived to the last shooting with a group of leaders but uncharacteristically slightly lost his rhythm, having tried to be the first to start shooting. Two missed shots meant that Fourcade finished fifth, his only race without a medal in the championships. Fourcade finished, however, as the medal table winner for the men's non-team races.

The biathlon World Cup then moved to Pyeongchang, South Korea where the next Olympics would be held. The first competition, the sprint, saw Fourcade miss once on both shootings. With his incredible ski-speed, he was again able to score a podium finish, a third place behind Julian Eberhard and Lowell Bailey. The third place was enough for Fourcade to yet again rewrite the history books, winning a record sixth overall title in a row. Like many times before, Fourcade was able to turn the tables in the following pursuit. He shot 20 out of 20 and when both Eberhard and Bailey in front of him had multiple misses, Fourcade was able to win with a large margin over Anton Shipulin. The victory meant that Fourcade now had 12 non-team victories in one season, tying the record of Ole Einar Bjørndalen. Fourcade then capped off the successful weekend by anchoring the French relay team to victory.

In Kontiolahti, Fourcade won the sprint with one miss, outskiing the clean-shooting Ondrej Moravec by just 0.6 seconds. This was the 13th non-team race victory of the season for Fourcade, an all-time record for one season. Fourcade was then unable to score a podium finish in the following pursuit, finishing fifth with four penalties. However, with the two races, he secured both the sprint discipline title as well as the pursuit discipline title.

The final competition weekend of the season in Oslo saw Fourcade finish the campaign in style. In the sprint, he missed one standing shot and finished second behind the clean-shooting Johannes Thingnes Bø. In the following pursuit, Fourcade missed twice and was again second, this time behind Anton Shipulin who had one penalty. Fourcade was able to beat Bø in the last loop to get a small revenge from the World Championship mass start from the year before. In the last competition of the season, the mass start, Fourcade needed considerably more points than Simon Schempp to win the discipline crystal globe. And he got just them, although not without drama. Fourcade did crush the field with a dominating performance, shooting 20 out of 20, but he also looked in danger of being disqualified, as he forgot to reload his magazines before the competition. However, the jury saw no rule violation in the way Fourcade received replacing magazines from his team and so the Frenchman was ruled the winner. With the record 14th non-team victory of the season, Fourcade won the mass start discipline World Cup, ahead of Simon Schempp who finished 20th. Fourcade later thanked Schempp and the German team for not wanting to protest the decision of the jury.

Fourcade won all five crystal globes of the season for a record third time and a record second time in a row. His overall title was a record-equalling sixth and a record sixth consecutive. He also equalled the record number of discipline titles won by Ole Einar Bjørndalen, both now had 20 small crystal globes. Fourcade also set the record for the most non-team races won in one season with 14 victories (and equalled the ladies' record of 14 set by Magdalena Forsberg of Sweden), as well as setting the record for consecutive Major Championships and World Championships with at least one non-team gold medal. Moreover, the season's total point tally of 1322 by Fourcade was also a record, Fourcade beating the next athlete (Anton Shipulin) by more than 400 points for the second time.

=== 2017–18 season: Olympic glory, all-time overall World Cup record ===
Like so many years before, the opening weekend of the biathlon season in Östersund was a success for Fourcade. He didn't make the podium in the single mixed relay with Marie Dorin Habert as they finished fourth. But that was to be the only non-podium finish for Fourcade that weekend. He missed twice on the last shooting in the individual race and finished third behind Johannes Thingnes Bø and compatriot Quentin Fillon Maillet. In the next race, the sprint, Fourcade seemed to be on his way to victory after just one missed shot. However, the late starting Tarjei Bø finished just 0.7 seconds quicker than the Frenchman with Bø missing once as well. Fourcade didn't seem to let this get him down, as he won the following pursuit in a convincing fashion. Heavy winds meant that the overall shooting performance of the race was poor. But Fourcade was able to clear 19 out of 20 targets and finished almost 50 seconds ahead of Jakov Fak and Fillon Maillet. This meant that Fourcade won at least one non-team race in the opening weekend for the seventh consecutive time and that he would once again leave Östersund wearing the yellow bib.

The second competition weekend in Hochfilzen saw Fourcade score two more podiums. He finished second behind Johannes Thingnes Bø in the sprint, shooting clean but losing 12 seconds of time to Bø on the tracks and on the range. Fourcade then finished third behind Bø and Jakov Fak in the pursuit, having missed a surprising five bullets.

The world cup then returned to France after more than three years, to Annecy Le Grand-Bornand. The sprint was another success for Fourcade as he once again scored a podium, a second place, but was again forced to step on the podium after Johannes Thingnes Bø. Bø won his fourth consecutive race in the following pursuit, with Fourcade second, a minute behind the Norwegian. Fourcade was able to stop the streak in the last competition before Christmas, the first mass start of the season. He shot 20 out of 20 and comfortably won ahead of Bø and Erik Lesser.

The first competitions after the Christmas break had previously been hard for Fourcade in many occasions. This wasn't the case at the start of year 2018, however, as he had a fantastic weekend in the foggy Oberhof. Fourcade shot clean in the sprint and withheld the late challenge of old rival Emil Hegle Svendsen. Johannes Thingnes Bø, the closest rival to Fourcade in the world cup standings, missed twice but still finished third. Fourcade then carried the momentum to the following pursuit and won it with one missed shot. It was the very first shot he fired and it meant that he went to the penalty ring alongside Johannes Bø. But Fourcade missed no more, and when Johannes and the leading Svendsen did, it was the Frenchman who got his third victory in a row. He even had time to stare the shooting Norwegians (Svendsen, Johannes and eventual third of the race, Tarjei Bø) after the last shooting, as an answer to Svendsen who had implied after the sprint, that Fourcade would be afraid on the Norwegian team.

The world cup then moved to Ruhpolding and like many times before, the fog and rain of Oberhof changed to clear weather. This didn't seem to change the momentum of men's biathlon, however, as Fourcade stormed to his fourth consecutive and fifth victory of the season in the Ruhpolding individual. The 20 km olympic and world champion looked to be flying home when he hit the nineteenth target in the last standing. But he surprisingly missed the last shot, which seemed to open the door for Johannes Thingnes Bø not only to win the race, but also take the small crystal globe. However, Bø too missed in the last standing and while Fourcade won comfortably, clean-shooting Ondrej Moravec beat Bø and left him third. This meant that the individual discipline title would be shared by Fourcade and Bø. The race was also the 14th consecutive non team race podium for Fourcade, who thus bettered his own record. Fourcade then had a second place in the mass start behind Johannes. The Frenchman came back from two missed shots in the first standing and 15th place to score a 15th consecutive non-team race podium after a clean last shooting and a fast last loop.

The final competition weekend before the Olympics saw Johannes Thingnes Bø start brilliantly in Antholz. He won both the sprint and the pursuit and left Fourcade second in both of the races. However, Fourcade was able to turn the tables in the mass start, which he won quite comfortably with two missed shots. And with Bø in the sixth place, Fourcade opened up a notable lead in the overall standings.

For the 2018 Winter Olympics in Pyeonchang, Fourcade was chosen to carry the French flag at the opening ceremonies. He said that it was a great honor and regarding the competitions added that he wanted to win one title and only after that would dream for more. His wish didn't happen in the sprint where Johannes Thingnes Bø missed three targets in the prone and seemingly left the door open for Fourcade. But the French great also missed three times and while he shot clean in the standings, it was only good enough for eighth place, some half a minute behind the surprise gold medalist Arnd Peiffer.

While Fourcade didn't medal in the sprint, he had, like in Sochi four years ago, a tolerable starting position in the pursuit. And like in Sochi, it proved to be decisive. Fourcade missed only one shot and produced some ski speed to once again have a lead to show the fist after the last shooting. With the gold, his third Olympic gold overall, Fourcade equaled the most number of gold medals won by a French athlete in Winter Olympics. Moreover, he extended his record of consecutive major championships with at least one non-team gold medal, now standing at eight. Fourcade then had the gold within his grasp in the individual race having cleaned the first 18 targets. But he narrowly missed the last two, missing out on the podium and allowing his biggest rival at the time, Johannes Thingnes Bø to finally claim his first Olympic gold and first medal altogether in the non team races.

Fourcade wasn't rattled by this, however, and while he didn't have the best memories from recent major championship mass starts, this time it was to be his turn. Johannes Thingnes Bø crumbled in the second prone, missing three times, while Fourcade climbed back from missing one in the first prone. Fourcade, Simon Schempp and Erik Lesser cleared the first standing and arrived at the last shooting with a healthy margin. Lesser missed twice, Schempp missed once and Fourcade seemed to clear for gold before missing the last shot. It meant that Fourcade and Schempp arrived together at the final sprint, this time the Frenchman narrowly taking the gold with 14 centimeters. The gold made Fourcade the most successful French Winter Olympian of all time. It also made him the most successful male biathlete of the Games in non-team races, equalling the achievement from Sochi. Next up in Pyeongchang was the mixed relay, where the French team had a good, but not a great start before the anchoring Fourcade. Marie Dorin Habert, Anais Bescond and Simon Desthieux carried France to medal contention, some 30 seconds behind the leading Germany. But it was Fourcade, who stormed the last leg with fast skiing and no missed shots, taking the gold for the French team with a wide margin to Norway and Italy.

After the Olympics the World Cup moved to Eastern Finland. Fourcade had been suffering from illness before the Kontiolahti weekend, but was still expected to start in the sprint. Surprisingly, he did not, announcing so just before the race. He also skipped the relays but was ready to compete in the mass start. The first shooting seemed ominous, Fourcade missing twice. But he got his game together and missed no more. He left the final shooting in the lead but Julian Eberhard sprinted past the exhausted Frenchman in the last few hundred meters. But still the second place made Fourcade quite satisfied after the two prone mistakes. And when Johannes Thingnes Bø missed five times to finish 19th, Fourcade was able to widen the gap in the overall ranking.

At the penultimate World Cup weekend in Oslo Holmenkollen, Fourcade shot clean in the sprint but fell on the opening lap and broke a ski pole. He finished third behind Henrik L’Abée-Lund and Johannes Thingnes Bø, who beat Fourcade by a fraction of a second.[188] Fourcade won the subsequent pursuit ahead of Lukas Hofer and Bø. The victory made Fourcade the most successful biathlete at Holmenkollen and extended his overall World Cup lead before the final weekend.[189]

The last weekend of the season in Tyumen, Russia started perfectly for Fourcade. He shot clean in the sprint and stormed through the snowfall to leave Simon Desthieux and Fredrik Lindström of Sweden behind with a margin of over half a minute. And when Johannes Thingnes Bø succumbed to 14th place, Fourcade secured the seventh consecutive overall World Cup title as well as the seventh consecutive sprint discipline title. Having clinched the overall title and a big lead in the pursuit discipline, Fourcade could have been excused for not concentrating on the pursuit competition. However, he did and easily won the race with his head start and only missing one shot, winning his 70th World Cup race. He did lose his concentration in the mass start, however. By missing four times in the last race of the season, Fourcade finished 19th, his worst result of the season. Regardless, he won the mass start discipline title, holding all five crystal globes of the season for the record fourth time.

== Achievements ==
All statistics are sourced from the International Biathlon Union.

This article uses the phrase "non-team" when referring to individual competitions to avoid mixing up one of the biathlon disciplines, the individual discipline and individual competitions in general.

=== World Cup ===
- 7 overall World Cup titles (all-time record)
- 7 overall World Cup titles in a row (all-time record)
- 26 discipline World Cup titles (all-time record)
- 8 Sprint World Cup titles (all-time record shared with Bjørndalen)
- 8 Pursuit World Cup titles (all-time record)
- 5 Individual World Cup titles (all-time record)
- 5 Mass Start World Cup titles (all-time record shared with Bjørndalen)
- 4 times the clean sweep of all five crystal globes won in one season (all-time record)
- 79 non-team World Cup victories (2nd to Bjørndalen, 95 victories)
- 14 non-team World Cup victories in one season (2nd to J.T. Bø, 16 victories)
- 144 non-team World Cup podiums (2nd to Bjørndalen, 170 podiums)
- 20 non-team World Cup podiums in one season + 2 non-team Olympic Games podiums (all-time record)
- 79 non-team World Cup victories out of 268 non-team starts, 29.5% win rate, personal highest 31% win rate (all-time record)
- 144 non-team World Cup podiums out of 268 non-team starts, 53.7% podium rate, personal highest 56.7% podium rate (all-time record)

=== Olympic Games ===
- 6 gold medals and 1 silver medals (2nd to Bjørndalen, 8 gold medals, 4 silver medals and 1 bronze medal)
- 4 non-team gold medals and 2 non-team silver medals (2nd to Bjørndalen, 5 gold medals, 3 silver medals and 1 bronze medal)
- 2 non-team gold medals and 1 non-team silver medal in a single Olympic Games (2nd to Bjørndalen, 3 gold medals)

=== World Championships ===
- 13 gold medals (3rd to Bjørndalen, 20 gold medals and J.T. Bø 22 gold medals)
- 28 medals : 13 gold medals, 10 silver medals and 5 bronze medals (3rd to Bjørndalen, 45 medals : 20 gold medals, 14 silver medals and 11 bronze medals and J.T. Bø, 31 medals : 22 Gold, 10 Silver, 4 Bronze)
- 11 non-team gold medals (tied for second with Bjørndalen and behind J.T. Bø 12 non-team gold)
- 18 non-team medals : 11 gold medals, 4 silver medals and 3 bronze medals (3rd to Bjørndalen, 26 medals : 11 gold medals, 6 silver medals and 9 bronze medals and J.T. Bø, 19 medals: 10 gold, 7 silver, 2 bronze))
- 3 non-team gold medals and 1 non-team silver medal in a single World Championships (all-time record shared with Raphael Poirée and J.T. Bø)
- 6 World Championships in a row with at least 1 non-team gold medal (all-time record)

=== Career ===
- 8 Major Championships (Olympic Games and World Championships) in a row with at least 1 non-team gold medal (all-time record)
- 4 times the "career Grand Slam" of a non-team olympic gold medal, a non-team World Championships gold medal, the overall World Cup title and all of the discipline World Cup titles (all-time record)
- 7 years in row with at least 7 non-team race victories (all-time record)
- 83 World Cup and Olympic Games non-team victories (3rd to J.T. Bø (90) and to Bjørndalen (95)
- 98 World Cup and Olympic Games victories altogether (3rd to Bjørndalen, 132 victories and J.T. Bø, 101 victories and counting)

== Personal life ==
Martin Fourcade was born on 14 September 1988, in Céret (in Northern Catalonia), France, to Gisèle and Marcel Fourcade.

He has an elder brother Simon, who is also a biathlete and a younger brother Brice.

He has two daughters, Manon (born on 10 September 2015) and Inès (born on 23 March 2017), with his partner Hélène. They reside in La Llagonne, France.

== Biathlon results ==
All results are sourced from the International Biathlon Union.

=== Olympic Games ===
7 medals (6 gold, 1 silver)

Event
Event	Age	Individual	Sprint	Pursuit	Mass Start	Relay	Mixed Relay
(Canada) 2010 Vancouver	21	13th	34th	33rd	Gold	6th	—N/a
(Russia) 2014 Sochi	25	Gold	6th	Gold	Silver	7th	5th
(South Korea) 2018 Pyeongchang	29	5th	8th	Gold	Gold	5th	Gold

*The mixed relay was added as an event in 2014.

=== World Championships ===
28 medals (13 gold, 10 silver, 5 bronze)

Event
Event	Age	Individual	Sprint	Pursuit	Mass Start	Relay	Mixed Relay	Single Mixed Relay
(South Korea) 2009 Pyeongchang	20	13th	18th	8th	15th	4th	—N/a	—N/a
(Russia) 2010 Khanty-Mansiysk*	21	—N/a	—N/a	—N/a	—N/a	—N/a	5th	—N/a
(Russia) 2011 Khanty-Mansiysk	22	10th	Silver	Gold	9th	11th	Bronze	—N/a
(Germany) 2012 Ruhpolding	23	25th	Gold	Gold	Gold	Silver	11th	—N/a
(Czech Republic) 2013 Nové Město	24	Gold	Silver	Silver	10th	Silver	Silver	—N/a
(Finland) 2015 Kontiolahti	26	Gold	12th	7th	10th	Bronze	Silver	—N/a
(Norway) 2016 Oslo Holmenkollen	27	Gold	Gold	Gold	Silver	9th	Gold	—N/a
(Austria) 2017 Hochfilzen	28	Bronze	Bronze	Gold	5th	Silver	Silver	—N/a
(Sweden) 2019 Östersund	30	39th	6th	5th	24th	6th	8th	–
(Italy) 2020 Antholz-Anterselva	31	Gold	Bronze	4th	7th	Gold	7th	–

*During Olympic seasons competitions are only held for those events not included in the Olympic program.
**The single mixed relay was added as an event in 2019.

Event
Event	Non-Team				Team				Total			
Event	1st place, gold medalist(s)	2nd place, silver medalist(s)	3rd place, bronze medalist(s)	Σ	1st place, gold medalist(s)	2nd place, silver medalist(s)	3rd place, bronze medalist(s)	Σ	1st place, gold medalist(s)	2nd place, silver medalist(s)	3rd place, bronze medalist(s)	Σ
Olympic Games	5	1	0	6	1	0	0	1	6	1	0	7
World Championships	11	4	3	18	2	6	2	11	13	10	5	29
Total	16	5	3	24	3	6	2	12	19	11	5	35

=== Junior/Youth World Championships ===
1 medal (1 bronze)

Event
Event	Age	Individual	Sprint	Pursuit	Mass Start	Relay	Mixed Relay
(Italy) 2007 Martell-Val Martello	18	5th	9th	9th	—N/a	Bronze	—N/a
(Germany) 2008 Ruhpolding	19	8th	11th	10th	—N/a	5th	—N/a

=== World Cup ===
33 titles (7 Overall, 5 Individual, 8 Sprint, 8 Pursuit, 5 Mass Start)

Season	Age	Overall			Individual			Sprint			Pursuit			Mass Start		
Season	Age	Races	Points	Position	Races	Points	Position	Races	Points	Position	Races	Points	Position	Races	Points	Position
2007–08	19	1/26	0	—N/a	0/4	—N/a	—N/a	1/11	0	—N/a	0/8	—N/a	—N/a	0/5	—N/a	—N/a
2008–09	20	19/26	345	24th	3/4	33	41st	8/10	121	31st	5/7	118	19th	3/5	73	25th
2009–10	21	22/25	729	4th	3/4	98	8th	9/10	254	8th	5/6	198	1st	5/5	159	5th
2010–11	22	26/26	997	3rd	4/4	133	3rd	10/10	310	4th	7/7	321	2nd	5/5	233	2nd
2011–12	23	25/26	1103	1st	3/3	107	4th	9/10	425	1st	8/8	385	1st	5/5	202	3rd
2012–13	24	26/26	1248	1st	3/3	180	1st	10/10	485	1st	8/8	389	1st	5/5	248	1st
2013–14	25	24/26*	934	1st	2/3*	60	8th	10/10*	402	1st	8/9*	298	1st	4/4*	174	1st
2014–15	26	25/25	1042	1st	3/3	120	2nd	10/10	416	1st	7/7	335	1st	5/5	186	3rd
2015–16	27	24/25	1151	1st	3/3	140	1st	9/9	379	1st	7/8	391	1st	5/5	242	1st
2016–17	28	26/26	1322	1st	3/3	162	1st	9/9	484	1st	9/9	502	1st	5/5	248	1st
2017–18	29	25/26*	1116	1st	3/3*	108	1st	8/9*	384	1st	7/8*	396	1st	5/6*	250	1st
2018–19	30	19/25	648	12th	2/3	62	12th	7/9	231	11th	6/8	223	10th	4/5	132	12th
2019–20	31	21/21	911	2nd	3/3	174	1st	8/8	360	1st	5/5	230	2nd	5/5	203	3rd

=== Individual victories ===
84 victories (15 In, 23 Sp, 30 Pu, 16 MS); victories at Winter Olympics are not counted as World Cup victories, but are listed here.

No.	Season	Date	Location	Discipline	Level
1	2009–10; 4 victories (1 Sp, 2 Pu, 1 MS)	21 February 2010	(Canada) Vancouver	15 km Mass Start	Olympic Games
2	2009–10; 4 victories (1 Sp, 2 Pu, 1 MS)	14 March 2010	(Finland) Kontiolahti	12.5 km Pursuit	World Cup
3	2009–10; 4 victories (1 Sp, 2 Pu, 1 MS)	18 March 2010	(Norway) Oslo Holmenkollen	10 km Sprint	World Cup
4	2009–10; 4 victories (1 Sp, 2 Pu, 1 MS)	20 March 2010	(Norway) Oslo Holmenkollen	12.5 km Pursuit	World Cup
5	2010–11; 3 victories (1 Pu, 2 MS)	22 January 2011	(Italy) Antholz-Anterselva	15 km Mass Start	World Cup
6	2010–11; 3 victories (1 Pu, 2 MS)	13 February 2011	(United States) Fort Kent	15 km Mass Start	World Cup
7	2010–11; 3 victories (1 Pu, 2 MS)	6 March 2011	(Russia) Khanty-Mansiysk	12.5 km Pursuit	World Championships
8	2011–12; 8 victories (1 In, 3 Sp, 3 Pu, 1 MS)	30 November 2011	(Sweden) Östersund	20 km Individual	World Cup
9	2011–12; 8 victories (1 In, 3 Sp, 3 Pu, 1 MS)	4 December 2011	(Sweden) Östersund	12.5 km Pursuit	World Cup
10	2011–12; 8 victories (1 In, 3 Sp, 3 Pu, 1 MS)	11 February 2012	(Finland) Kontiolahti	10 km Sprint	World Cup
11	2011–12; 8 victories (1 In, 3 Sp, 3 Pu, 1 MS)	3 March 2012	(Germany) Ruhpolding	10 km Sprint	World Championships
12	2011–12; 8 victories (1 In, 3 Sp, 3 Pu, 1 MS)	4 March 2012	(Germany) Ruhpolding	12.5 km Pursuit	World Championships
13	2011–12; 8 victories (1 In, 3 Sp, 3 Pu, 1 MS)	11 March 2012	(Germany) Ruhpolding	15 km Mass Start	World Championships
14	2011–12; 8 victories (1 In, 3 Sp, 3 Pu, 1 MS)	16 March 2012	(Russia) Khanty-Mansiysk	10 km Sprint	World Cup
15	2011–12; 8 victories (1 In, 3 Sp, 3 Pu, 1 MS)	17 March 2012	(Russia) Khanty-Mansiysk	12.5 km Pursuit	World Cup
16	2012–13; 10 victories (3 In, 3 Sp, 2 Pu, 2 MS)	28 November 2012	(Sweden) Östersund	20 km Individual	World Cup
17	2012–13; 10 victories (3 In, 3 Sp, 2 Pu, 2 MS)	2 December 2012	(Sweden) Östersund	12.5 km Pursuit	World Cup
18	2012–13; 10 victories (3 In, 3 Sp, 2 Pu, 2 MS)	12 January 2013	(Germany) Ruhpolding	10 km Sprint	World Cup
19	2012–13; 10 victories (3 In, 3 Sp, 2 Pu, 2 MS)	13 January 2013	(Germany) Ruhpolding	15 km Mass Start	World Cup
20	2012–13; 10 victories (3 In, 3 Sp, 2 Pu, 2 MS)	14 February 2013	(Czech Republic) Nové Město	20 km Individual	World Championships
21	2012–13; 10 victories (3 In, 3 Sp, 2 Pu, 2 MS)	2 March 2013	(Norway) Oslo Holmenkollen	12.5 km Pursuit	World Cup
22	2012–13; 10 victories (3 In, 3 Sp, 2 Pu, 2 MS)	7 March 2013	(Russia) Sochi	20 km Individual	World Cup
23	2012–13; 10 victories (3 In, 3 Sp, 2 Pu, 2 MS)	9 March 2013	(Russia) Sochi	10 km Sprint	World Cup
24	2012–13; 10 victories (3 In, 3 Sp, 2 Pu, 2 MS)	15 March 2013	(Russia) Khanty-Mansiysk	10 km Sprint	World Cup
25	2012–13; 10 victories (3 In, 3 Sp, 2 Pu, 2 MS)	17 March 2013	(Russia) Khanty-Mansiysk	15 km Mass Start	World Cup
26	2013–14; 7 victories (2 In, 1 Sp, 2 Pu, 2 MS)	28 November 2013	(Sweden) Östersund	20 km Individual	World Cup
27	2013–14; 7 victories (2 In, 1 Sp, 2 Pu, 2 MS)	30 November 2013	(Sweden) Östersund	10 km Sprint	World Cup
28	2013–14; 7 victories (2 In, 1 Sp, 2 Pu, 2 MS)	9 December 2013	(Austria) Hochfilzen	12.5 km Pursuit	World Cup
29	2013–14; 7 victories (2 In, 1 Sp, 2 Pu, 2 MS)	5 January 2014	(Germany) Oberhof	15 km Mass Start	World Cup
30	2013–14; 7 victories (2 In, 1 Sp, 2 Pu, 2 MS)	10 February 2014	(Russia) Sochi	12.5 km Pursuit	Olympic Games
31	2013–14; 7 victories (2 In, 1 Sp, 2 Pu, 2 MS)	13 February 2014	(Russia) Sochi	20 km Individual	Olympic Games
32	2013–14; 7 victories (2 In, 1 Sp, 2 Pu, 2 MS)	23 March 2014	(Norway) Oslo Holmenkollen	15 km Mass Start	World Cup
33	2014–15; 8 victories (2 In, 3 Sp, 2 Pu, 1 MS)	6 December 2014	(Sweden) Östersund	10 km Sprint	World Cup
34	2014–15; 8 victories (2 In, 3 Sp, 2 Pu, 1 MS)	7 December 2014	(Sweden) Östersund	12.5 km Pursuit	World Cup
35	2014–15; 8 victories (2 In, 3 Sp, 2 Pu, 1 MS)	14 December 2014	(Austria) Hochfilzen	12.5 km Pursuit	World Cup
36	2014–15; 8 victories (2 In, 3 Sp, 2 Pu, 1 MS)	10 January 2015	(Germany) Oberhof	10 km Sprint	World Cup
37	2014–15; 8 victories (2 In, 3 Sp, 2 Pu, 1 MS)	11 January 2015	(Germany) Oberhof	15 km Mass Start	World Cup
38	2014–15; 8 victories (2 In, 3 Sp, 2 Pu, 1 MS)	12 February 2015	(Norway) Oslo Holmenkollen	20 km Individual	World Cup
39	2014–15; 8 victories (2 In, 3 Sp, 2 Pu, 1 MS)	12 March 2015	(Finland) Kontiolahti	20 km Individual	World Championships
40	2014–15; 8 victories (2 In, 3 Sp, 2 Pu, 1 MS)	19 March 2015	(Russia) Khanty-Mansiysk	10 km Sprint	World Cup
41	2015–16; 10 victories (2 In, 3 Sp, 4 Pu, 1 MS)	5 December 2015	(Sweden) Östersund	10 km Sprint	World Cup
42	2015–16; 10 victories (2 In, 3 Sp, 4 Pu, 1 MS)	6 December 2015	(Sweden) Östersund	12.5 km Pursuit	World Cup
43	2015–16; 10 victories (2 In, 3 Sp, 4 Pu, 1 MS)	12 December 2015	(Austria) Hochfilzen	12.5 km Pursuit	World Cup
44	2015–16; 10 victories (2 In, 3 Sp, 4 Pu, 1 MS)	10 January 2016	(Germany) Ruhpolding	15 km Mass Start	World Cup
45	2015–16; 10 victories (2 In, 3 Sp, 4 Pu, 1 MS)	13 January 2016	(Germany) Ruhpolding	20 km Individual	World Cup
46	2015–16; 10 victories (2 In, 3 Sp, 4 Pu, 1 MS)	4 February 2016	(Canada) Canmore	10 km Sprint	World Cup
47	2015–16; 10 victories (2 In, 3 Sp, 4 Pu, 1 MS)	12 February 2016	(United States) Presque Isle	12.5 km Pursuit	World Cup
48	2015–16; 10 victories (2 In, 3 Sp, 4 Pu, 1 MS)	5 March 2016	(Norway) Oslo Holmenkollen	10 km Sprint	World Championships
49	2015–16; 10 victories (2 In, 3 Sp, 4 Pu, 1 MS)	6 March 2016	(Norway) Oslo Holmenkollen	12.5 km Pursuit	World Championships
50	2015–16; 10 victories (2 In, 3 Sp, 4 Pu, 1 MS)	10 March 2016	(Norway) Oslo Holmenkollen	20 km Individual	World Championships
51	2016–17; 14 victories (1 In, 5 Sp, 6 Pu, 2 MS)	1 December 2016	(Sweden) Östersund	20 km Individual	World Cup
52	2016–17; 14 victories (1 In, 5 Sp, 6 Pu, 2 MS)	3 December 2016	(Sweden) Östersund	10 km Sprint	World Cup
53	2016–17; 14 victories (1 In, 5 Sp, 6 Pu, 2 MS)	9 December 2016	(Slovenia) Pokljuka	10 km Sprint	World Cup
54	2016–17; 14 victories (1 In, 5 Sp, 6 Pu, 2 MS)	10 December 2016	(Slovenia) Pokljuka	12.5 km Pursuit	World Cup
55	2016–17; 14 victories (1 In, 5 Sp, 6 Pu, 2 MS)	15 December 2016	(Czech Republic) Nové Město	10 km Sprint	World Cup
56	2016–17; 14 victories (1 In, 5 Sp, 6 Pu, 2 MS)	17 December 2016	(Czech Republic) Nové Město	12.5 km Pursuit	World Cup
57	2016–17; 14 victories (1 In, 5 Sp, 6 Pu, 2 MS)	18 December 2016	(Czech Republic) Nové Město	15 km Mass Start	World Cup
58	2016–17; 14 victories (1 In, 5 Sp, 6 Pu, 2 MS)	7 January 2017	(Germany) Oberhof	12.5 km Pursuit	World Cup
59	2016–17; 14 victories (1 In, 5 Sp, 6 Pu, 2 MS)	13 January 2017	(Germany) Ruhpolding	10 km Sprint	World Cup
60	2016–17; 14 victories (1 In, 5 Sp, 6 Pu, 2 MS)	15 January 2017	(Germany) Ruhpolding	12.5 km Pursuit	World Cup
61	2016–17; 14 victories (1 In, 5 Sp, 6 Pu, 2 MS)	12 February 2017	(Austria) Hochfilzen	12.5 km Pursuit	World Championships
62	2016–17; 14 victories (1 In, 5 Sp, 6 Pu, 2 MS)	4 March 2017	(South Korea) Pyeongchang	12.5 km Pursuit	World Cup
63	2016–17; 14 victories (1 In, 5 Sp, 6 Pu, 2 MS)	10 March 2017	(Finland) Kontiolahti	10 km Sprint	World Cup
64	2016–17; 14 victories (1 In, 5 Sp, 6 Pu, 2 MS)	19 March 2017	(Norway) Oslo Holmenkollen	15 km Mass Start	World Cup
65	2017–18; 11 victories (1 In, 2 Sp, 5 Pu, 3 MS)	3 December 2017	(Sweden) Östersund	12.5 km Pursuit	World Cup
66	2017–18; 11 victories (1 In, 2 Sp, 5 Pu, 3 MS)	17 December 2017	(France) Annecy	15 km Mass Start	World Cup
67	2017–18; 11 victories (1 In, 2 Sp, 5 Pu, 3 MS)	5 January 2018	(Germany) Oberhof	10 km Sprint	World Cup
68	2017–18; 11 victories (1 In, 2 Sp, 5 Pu, 3 MS)	6 January 2018	(Germany) Oberhof	12.5 km Pursuit	World Cup
69	2017–18; 11 victories (1 In, 2 Sp, 5 Pu, 3 MS)	10 January 2018	(Germany) Ruhpolding	20 km Individual	World Cup
70	2017–18; 11 victories (1 In, 2 Sp, 5 Pu, 3 MS)	21 January 2018	(Italy) Antholz-Anterselva	15 km Mass Start	World Cup
71	2017–18; 11 victories (1 In, 2 Sp, 5 Pu, 3 MS)	12 February 2018	(South Korea) Pyeongchang	12.5 km Pursuit	Olympic Games
72	2017–18; 11 victories (1 In, 2 Sp, 5 Pu, 3 MS)	18 February 2018	(South Korea) Pyeongchang	15 km Mass Start	Olympic Games
73	2017–18; 11 victories (1 In, 2 Sp, 5 Pu, 3 MS)	17 March 2018	(Norway) Oslo Holmenkollen	12.5 km Pursuit	World Cup
74	2017–18; 11 victories (1 In, 2 Sp, 5 Pu, 3 MS)	22 March 2018	(Russia) Tyumen	10 km Sprint	World Cup
75	2017–18; 11 victories (1 In, 2 Sp, 5 Pu, 3 MS)	24 March 2018	(Russia) Tyumen	12.5 km Pursuit	World Cup
76	2018–19; 2 victories (1 In, 1 Pu)	6 December 2018	(Slovenia) Pokljuka	20 km Individual	World Cup
77	2018–19; 2 victories (1 In, 1 Pu)	15 December 2018	(Austria) Hochfilzen	12.5 km Pursuit	World Cup
78	2019–20; 7 victories (2 In, 2 Sp, 2 Pu, 1 MS)	4 December 2019	(Sweden) Östersund	20 km Individual	World Cup
79	2019–20; 7 victories (2 In, 2 Sp, 2 Pu, 1 MS)	10 January 2020	(Germany) Oberhof	10 km Sprint	World Cup
80	2019–20; 7 victories (2 In, 2 Sp, 2 Pu, 1 MS)	12 January 2020	(Germany) Oberhof	15 km Mass Start	World Cup
81	2019–20; 7 victories (2 In, 2 Sp, 2 Pu, 1 MS)	16 January 2020	(Germany) Ruhpolding	10 km Sprint	World Cup
82	2019–20; 7 victories (2 In, 2 Sp, 2 Pu, 1 MS)	19 January 2020	(Germany) Ruhpolding	12.5 km Pursuit	World Cup
83	2019–20; 7 victories (2 In, 2 Sp, 2 Pu, 1 MS)	19 February 2020	(Italy) Antholz-Anterselva	20 km Individual	World Championships
84	2019–20; 7 victories (2 In, 2 Sp, 2 Pu, 1 MS)	14 March 2020	(Finland) Kontiolahti	12.5 km Pursuit	World Cup

=== Relay victories ===
15 victories (9 RL, 4 MR, 2 SR);

No.	Season	Date	Location	Discipline	Level	Teammates
1	2009–10; 1 victory (1 RL)	6 December 2009	(Sweden) Östersund	Men's 4 × 7.5 km Relay	World Cup	Jay / Defrasne / S.Fourcade / Fourcade
2	2011–12; 1 victory (1 RL)	22 January 2012	(Italy) Antholz-Anterselva	Men's 4 × 7.5 km Relay	World Cup	Béatrix / S.Fourcade / Boeuf / Fourcade
3	2012–13; 2 victories (2 RL)	10 January 2013	(Germany) Ruhpolding	Men's 4 × 7.5 km Relay	World Cup	S.Fourcade / Béatrix / Boeuf / Fourcade
4	2012–13; 2 victories (2 RL)	20 January 2013	(Italy) Antholz-Anterselva	Men's 4 × 7.5 km Relay	World Cup	S.Fourcade / Béatrix / Boeuf / Fourcade
5	2013–14; 1 victory (1 RL)	19 January 2014	(Italy) Antholz-Anterselva	Men's 4 × 7.5 km Relay	World Cup	S.Fourcade / Boeuf / Béatrix / Fourcade
6	2014–15; 1 victory (1 RL)	30 November 2014	(Sweden) Östersund	Mixed 2×6 km + 2×7.5 km Relay	World Cup	Bescond / Chevalier / S.Fourcade / Fourcade
7	2015–16; 2 victories (1 MR, 1 SR)	7 February 2016	(Canada) Canmore	Single Mixed 1×6 km + 1×7.5 km Relay	World Cup	Dorin Habert / Fourcade
8	2015–16; 2 victories (1 MR, 1 SR)	3 March 2016	(Norway) Oslo Holmenkollen	Mixed 2×6 km + 2×7.5 km Relay	World Championships	Bescond / Dorin Habert / Fillon Maillet / Fourcade
9	2016–17; 3 victories (2 RL, 1 SR)	27 November 2016	(Sweden) Östersund	Single Mixed 1×6 km + 1×7.5 km Relay	World Cup	Dorin Habert / Fourcade
10	2016–17; 3 victories (2 RL, 1 SR)	11 December 2016	(Slovenia) Pokljuka	Men's 4 × 7.5 km Relay	World Cup	Béatrix / Fillon Maillet / Desthieux / Fourcade
11	2016–17; 3 victories (2 RL, 1 SR)	5 March 2017	(South Korea) Pyeongchang	Men's 4 × 7.5 km Relay	World Cup	Béatrix / S.Fourcade / Desthieux / Fourcade
12	2017–18; 1 victory (1 MR)	20 February 2018	(South Korea) Pyeongchang	Mixed 2×6 km + 2×7.5 km Relay	Olympic Games	Dorin Habert / Bescond / Desthieux / Fourcade
13	2018–19; 1 victory (1 MR)	2 December 2018	(Slovenia) Pokljuka	Mixed 2×6 km + 2×7.5 km Relay	World Cup	Bescond / Braisaz / Fourcade / Desthieux
14	2019–20; 2 victories (2 RL)	18 January 2020	(Germany) Ruhpolding	Men's 4 × 7.5 km Relay	World Cup	Jacquelin / Fourcade / Desthieux / Fillon Maillet
15	2019–20; 2 victories (2 RL)	22 February 2020	(Italy) Antholz-Anterselva	Men's 4 × 7.5 km Relay	World Championships	Jacquelin / Fourcade / Desthieux / Fillon Maillet

=== Podiums ===
Season	Podiums															
Season	Individual			Sprint			Pursuit			Mass Start			Total			
Season	1st place, gold medalist(s)	2nd place, silver medalist(s)	3rd place, bronze medalist(s)	1st place, gold medalist(s)	2nd place, silver medalist(s)	3rd place, bronze medalist(s)	1st place, gold medalist(s)	2nd place, silver medalist(s)	3rd place, bronze medalist(s)	1st place, gold medalist(s)	2nd place, silver medalist(s)	3rd place, bronze medalist(s)	1st place, gold medalist(s)	2nd place, silver medalist(s)	3rd place, bronze medalist(s)	Σ
2008	–	–	–	0	0	0	–	–	–	–	–	–	0	0	0	0
2009	0	0	0	0	0	0	0	0	0	0	0	0	0	0	0	0
2010	0	0	0	1	0	1	2	0	0	1	0	0	4	0	1	5
2011	0	1	1	0	3	1	1	2	1	2	0	0	3	6	3	12
2012	1	0	0	3	1	2	3	2	0	1	0	1	8	3	3	14
2013	3	0	0	3	3	1	2	1	3	2	1	0	10	5	4	19
2014	2	0	0	1	2	2	2	1	1	2	2	0	7	5	3	15
2015	2	0	0	3	1	0	2	0	2	1	1	0	8	2	2	12
2016	2	0	0	3	1	1	4	2	0	1	2	0	10	5	1	16
2017	1	1	1	5	1	2	6	1	1	1	0	1	14	3	5	22
2018	1	0	1	2	4	1	5	2	1	3	2	0	11	8	3	22
2019	1	0	0	0	1	0	1	0	0	0	0	0	2	1	0	3
2020	2	1	0	2	1	1	2	0	0	1	0	0	7	2	1	10
Total	15	3	3	23	18	12	30	11	9	16	8	2	84	40	26	150
Total	21			53			50			26			150			150

== Honours ==
- Officer of the Legion of Honour (2018)
- Knight of the Ordre national du Mérite (2010)

== See also ==
- List of multiple Olympic gold medalists

Olympic Games
Preceded by Jason Lamy-Chappuis	Flagbearer for France; Pyeongchang 2018	Succeeded by Tessa Worley; Kevin Rolland
