= Macx Davies =

Canadian biathlete (born 1992)

Personal information
- Born: December 24, 1992 (age 33) Calgary, Alberta, Canada
- Home town: Canmore, Alberta, Canada
- Height: 181 cm (5 ft 11 in)

Sport
- Country: Canada
- Sport: Biathlon

Macx Davies (born December 24, 1992) is a Canadian biathlete. He was born in Calgary, Alberta. He has competed in the Biathlon World Cup, and represented Canada at the Biathlon World Championships 2016.

== Career ==
=== 2018 Winter Olympics ===
In January 2018, Davies was named to Canada's 2018 Olympic team.

== Biathlon results ==
All results are sourced from the International Biathlon Union.

=== Olympic Games ===
0 medals

Event	Individual	Sprint	Pursuit	Mass start	Relay	Mixed relay
(South Korea) 2018 Pyeongchang	—	—	—	—	11th	—

=== World Championships ===
0 medals

Event	Individual	Sprint	Pursuit	Mass start	Relay	Mixed relay
(Norway) 2016 Oslo	—	58th	53rd	—	—	—
(Austria) 2017 Hochfilzen	42nd	79th	—	—	13th	—

*During Olympic seasons competitions are only held for those events not included in the Olympic program.
