= Serafin Wiestner =

Swiss biathlete (born 1990)

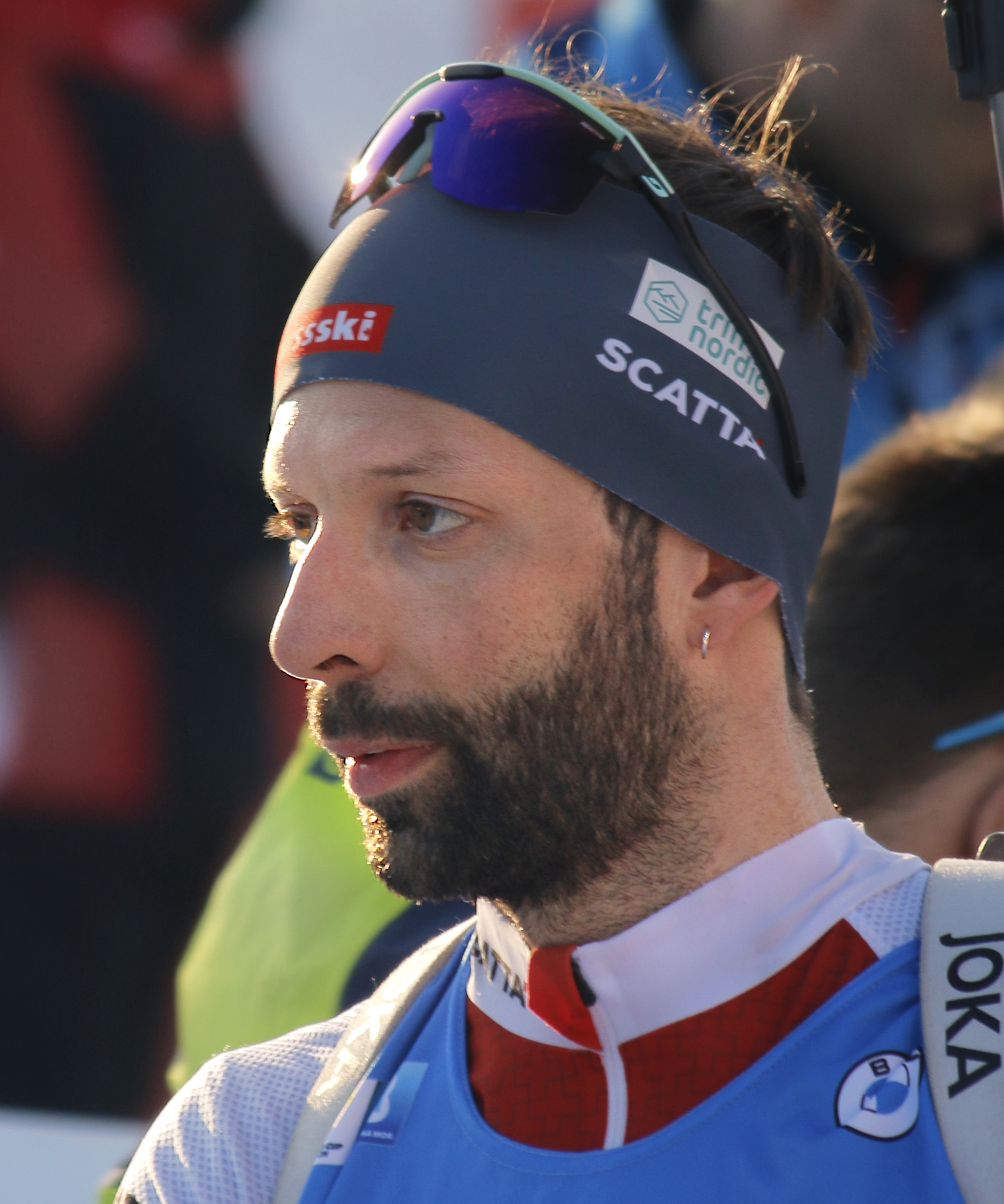
- Serafin Wiestner in 2023

Personal information
- Born: 20 July 1990 (age 36) Ilanz, Switzerland
- Height: 6 ft 1 in (185 cm)

Sport
- Sport: Skiing
- Club: SC Trin
Medal record
European Championships
Bronze medal – third place	2022 Arber	Mixed relay
- Updated on 10 February 2014

Serafin Wiestner (born 20 July 1990) is a Swiss biathlete.

He competed in the 2014 Winter Olympics for Switzerland where he finished 40th in the sprint.

== Biathlon results ==
All results are sourced from the International Biathlon Union.

=== Olympic Games ===
0 medals

Event	Individual	Sprint	Pursuit	Mass start	Relay	Mixed relay
(Russia) 2014 Sochi	—	40th	56th	—	14th	—
(South Korea) 2018 Pyeongchang	—	9th	28th	24th	15th	13th

=== World Championships ===
0 medals

Event	Individual	Sprint	Pursuit	Mass start	Relay	Mixed relay	Single mixed relay
(Finland) 2015 Kontiolahti	61st	29th	50th	—	7th	—	
(Norway) 2016 Oslo Holmenkollen	53rd	11th	20th	27th	10th	14th	
(Austria) 2017 Hochfilzen	44th	18th	26th	29th	16th	14th	
(Sweden) 2019 Östersund	—	46th	49th	—	11th	—	14th
(Italy) 2020 Rasen-Antholz	51st	54th	46th	—	15th	10th	—
(Slovenia) 2021 Pokljuka	42nd	—	—	—	11th	—	—
(Germany) 2023 Oberhof	53rd	81st	—	—	6th	—	—

*During Olympic seasons competitions are only held for those events not included in the Olympic program.
**The single mixed relay was added as an event in 2019.
