= Kauri Kõiv =

Estonian biathlete (born 1983)

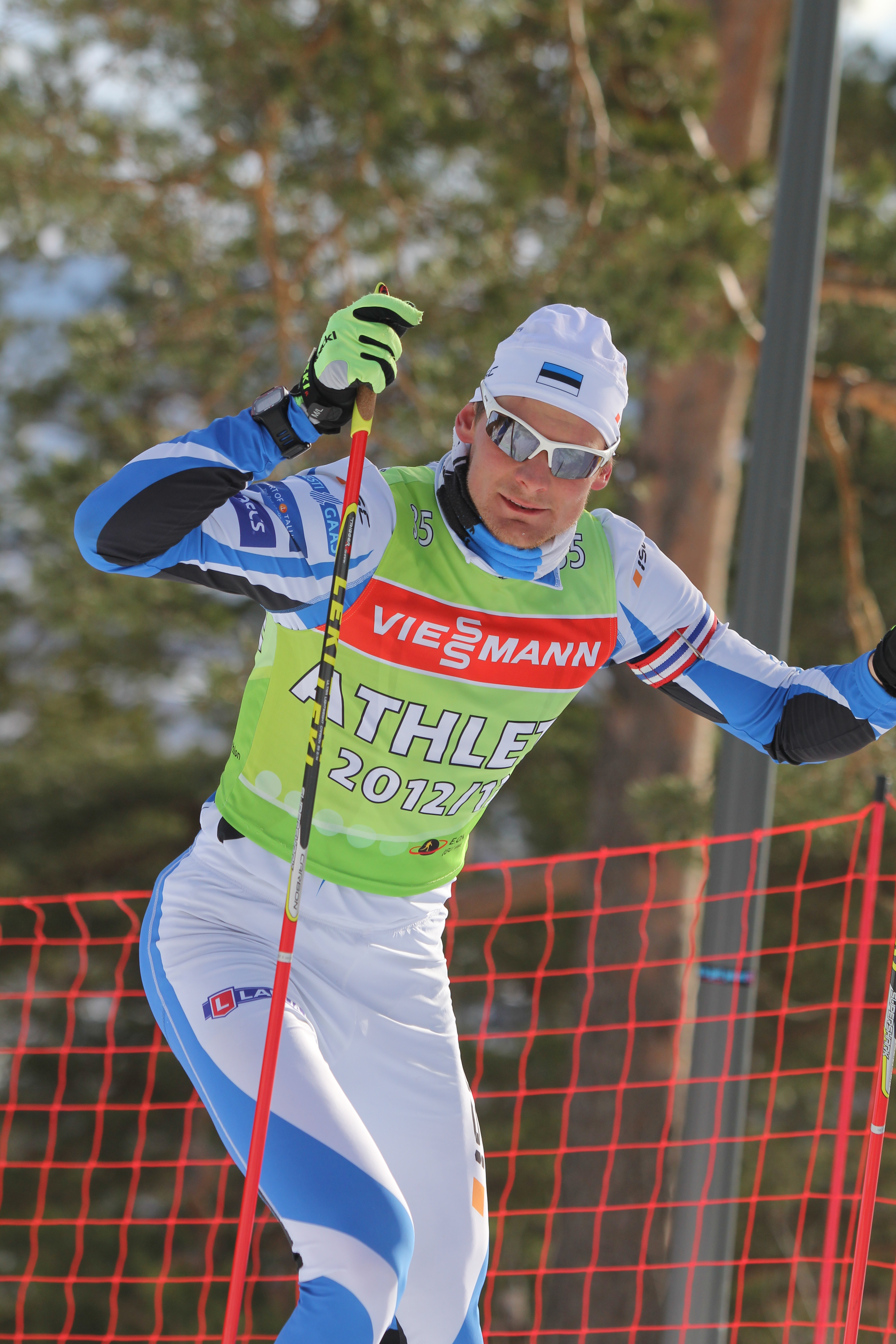
Kauri Kõiv at Biathlon World Cup in Oslo 2013

Kauri Kõiv (born July 25, 1983, Elva) is a former Estonian biathlete. At the 2010 Winter Olympics in Vancouver, he finished 14th in the 4×7.5 km relay, 44th in the 20 km individual, 48th in the 10 km sprint and 50th in the 12.5 km pursuit. He represented Estonia at the 2014 Winter Olympics and 2018 Winter Olympics.

== Biathlon results ==
All results are sourced from the International Biathlon Union.

=== Olympic Games ===
0 medals

Event	Individual	Sprint	Pursuit	Mass start	Relay	Mixed relay
(Canada) 2010 Vancouver	44th	48th	50th	—	14th	—
(Russia) 2014 Sochi	77th	54th	46th	—	17th	14th
(South Korea) 2018 Pyeongchang	68th	76th	—	—	13th	—

:*The mixed relay was added as an event in 2014.

=== World Championships ===
0 medals

Event	Individual	Sprint	Pursuit	Mass start	Relay	Mixed relay	Single mixed relay
(Russia) 2011 Khanty-Mansiysk	77th	71st	—	—	15th	14th	—
(Germany) 2012 Ruhpolding	26th	59th	56th	—	18th	—	—
(Czech Republic) 2013 Nové Město	36th	31st	48th	—	15th	20th	—
(Finland) 2015 Kontiolahti	59th	53rd	53rd	—	15th	19th	—
(Norway) 2016 Oslo	24th	38th	57th	—	14th	—	—
(Austria) 2017 Hochfilzen	30th	29th	35th	—	21st	21st	—
(Sweden) 2019 Östersund	82nd	—	—	—	14th	—	—

*During Olympic seasons competitions are only held for those events not included in the Olympic program.
**The single mixed relay was added as an event in 2019.
