= 2015–16 Biathlon World Cup – Sprint Women =

The 2015–16 Biathlon World Cup – Sprint Women started on Saturday December 5, 2015 in Östersund and finished on March 17, 2016 in Khanty-Mansiysk. The defending titlist Darya Domracheva of Belarus missed the season due to illness. Gabriela Soukalová of the Czech Republic won the title.

== Competition format ==
The 7.5 kilometres (4.7 mi) sprint race is the third oldest biathlon event; the distance is skied over three laps. The biathlete shoots two times at any shooting lane, first prone, then standing, totalling 10 targets. For each missed target the biathlete has to complete a penalty lap of around 150 metres. Competitors' starts are staggered, normally by 30 seconds.

== 2014–15 Top 3 Standings ==
Medal	Athlete	Points
Gold:	(Belarus) Darya Domracheva	416
Silver:	(Finland) Kaisa Mäkäräinen	364
Bronze:	(Czech Republic) Veronika Vítková	347

== Medal winners ==
Event:	Gold:	Time	Silver:	Time	Bronze:	Time
Östersund details	Gabriela Soukalová; Czech Republic	19:46.2 (0+0)	Federica Sanfilippo; Italy	20:01.2 (0+0)	Olena Pidhrushna; Ukraine	20:24.6 (1+0)
Hochfilzen details	Franziska Hildebrand; Germany	20:04.1 (0+0)	Maren Hammerschmidt; Germany	20:19.2 (0+0)	Miriam Gössner; Germany	20:25.1 (0+1)
Pokljuka details	Marie Dorin Habert; France	20:17.8 (0+0)	Laura Dahlmeier; Germany	20:18.9 (0+0)	Franziska Hildebrand; Germany	20:90.8 (0+0)
Ruhpolding details	Franziska Hildebrand; Germany	19:46.5 (0+0)	Gabriela Soukalová; Czech Republic	19:46.8 (0+0)	Kaisa Mäkäräinen; Finland	19:48.8 (0+0)
Antholz details	Olga Podchufarova; Russia	21:01.9 (0+0)	Dorothea Wierer; Italy	21:09.9 (0+1)	Ekaterina Yurlova; Russia	21:24.0 (0+1)
Canmore details	Olena Pidhrushna; Ukraine	19:56.9 (0+0)	Krystyna Guzik; Poland	20:04.4 (0+0)	Dorothea Wierer; Italy	20:09.3 (0+1)
Presque Isle details	Gabriela Soukalová; Czech Republic	20:02.2 (0+0)	Susan Dunklee; United States	20:20.0 (0+0)	Krystyna Guzik; Poland	20:21.3 (0+0)
World Championships details	Tiril Eckhoff; Norway	21:10.8 (0+0)	Marie Dorin Habert; France	21:25.8 (0+0)	Laura Dahlmeier; Germany	21:30.6 (1+0)
Khanty-Mansiysk details	Kaisa Mäkäräinen; Finland	20:42.3 (0+1)	Gabriela Soukalová; Czech Republic	20:45.4 (0+0)	Marte Olsbu; Norway	20:47.1 (0+0)

== Standings ==
#	Name	ÖST	HOC	POK	RUH	ANT	CAN	PRE	WCH	KHA	Total
1	Gabriela Soukalová (CZE)	60	34	40	54	32	36	60	43	54	413
2	Marie Dorin Habert (FRA)	38	31	60	29	38	12	43	54	31	336
3	Dorothea Wierer (ITA)	21	25	25	38	54	48	36	40	40	327
4	Kaisa Mäkäräinen (FIN)	31	13	31	48	23	31	40	32	60	309
5	Olena Pidhrushna (UKR)	48	27	0	36	40	60	27	25	36	299
6	Franziska Hildebrand (GER)	24	60	48	60	22	0	—	31	30	275
7	Veronika Vítková (CZE)	27	9	43	32	34	26	31	36	0	238
8	Anaïs Bescond (FRA)	0	43	14	20	43	17	34	29	34	234
9	Laura Dahlmeier (GER)	—	38	54	43	—	25	—	48	5	213
10	Krystyna Guzik (POL)	0	22	34	17	15	54	48	0	22	212
11	Franziska Preuß (GER)	43	20	32	—	—	38	5	27	38	203
12	Miriam Gössner (GER)	23	48	26	0	31	14	19	—	26	187
13	Susan Dunklee (USA)	0	0	38	30	4	6	54	34	16	182
14	Karin Oberhofer (ITA)	34	32	21	6	36	19	12	5	13	178
15	Juliya Dzhyma (UKR)	28	36	22	34	26	0	0	10	15	171
16	Olga Podchufarova (RUS)	7	24	4	40	60	10	25	0	—	170
17	Justine Braisaz (FRA)	18	16	0	27	27	11	10	16	43	168
18	Lisa Theresa Hauser (AUT)	30	29	12	14	13	0	13	25	25	161
19	Magdalena Gwizdoń (POL)	17	6	27	15	29	23	24	0	19	160
20	Tiril Eckhoff (NOR)	40	11	2	24	21	—	—	60	—	158
21	Ekaterina Yurlova (RUS)	—	21	11	11	48	0	29	22	9	151
22	Marte Olsbu (NOR)	15	0	0	16	30	0	—	30	48	139
23	Selina Gasparin (SUI)	0	30	—	7	25	0	38	0	27	127
24	Monika Hojnisz (POL)	5	0	30	13	28	43	0	0	0	119
25	Vanessa Hinz (GER)	32	26	28	28	0	—	—	0	0	114
26	Daria Virolaynen (RUS)	0	1	17	31	9	29	1	3	21	112
27	Maren Hammerschmidt (GER)	0	54	36	0	—	—	—	—	17	107
28	Lucie Charvátová (CZE)	0	40	24	0	0	DSQ	22	8	11	105
29	Nadezhda Skardino (BLR)	0	19	20	12	12	—	—	9	32	104
30	Federica Sanfilippo (ITA)	54	0	20	4	0	15	7	0	—	100
31	Eva Puskarčíková (CZE)	0	17	29	21	14	0	16	—	—	97
32	Fuyuko Tachizaki (JPN)	0	15	0	22	0	30	0	0	18	85
33	Iryna Varvynets (UKR)	—	—	8	0	3	34	8	28	0	81
34	Lisa Vittozzi (ITA)	0	4	0	—	11	24	0	21	14	74
35	Tatiana Akimova (RUS)	0	0	—	9	0	18	4	13	29	73
36	Jana Gereková (SVK)	29	3	16	23	0	0	0	1	0	72
37	Fanny Horn Birkeland (NOR)	8	23	—	11	1	—	—	0	28	71
38	Baiba Bendika (LAT)	0	0	0	0	0	40	26	0	4	70
39	Olga Abramova (UKR)	36	28	0	0	5	—	—	—	—	69
40	Célia Aymonier (FRA)	—	0	0	—	10	28	30	0	0	68
41	Teja Gregorin (SLO)	10	0	0	—	7	0	20	11	20	68
42	Ekaterina Shumilova (RUS)	0	18	0	18	—	20	2	—	6	64
43	Mona Brorsson (SWE)	0	0	5	1	0	0	11	38	8	63
44	Nastassia Dubarezava (BLR)	0	0	0	3	—	—	17	18	24	62
45	Rosanna Crawford (CAN)	19	2	18	—	8	0	—	12	0	59
46	Anaïs Chevalier (FRA)	—	—	6	—	18	16	0	15	0	55
47	Darya Yurkevich (BLR)	22	12	0	19	0	0	—	—	0	53
48	Hannah Dreissigacker (USA)	0	0	0	—	—	13	14	23	—	50
49	Luise Kummer (GER)	—	—	—	0	—	27	21	—	—	48
50	Galina Vishnevskaya (KAZ)	0	0	0	—	0	—	23	17	7	47
51	Valj Semerenko (UKR)	0	8	15	0	20	—	—	0	DNS	43
52	Julia Ransom (CAN)	9	0	10	0	0	22	—	0	0	41
53	Ingela Andersson (SWE)	—	—	—	—	0	0	18	19	0	37
54	Linn Persson (SWE)	0	0	0	5	24	DNS	0	7	0	36
55	Kaia Wøien Nicolaisen (NOR)	—	—	—	—	0	0	32	—	3	35
56	Mari Laukkanen (FIN)	0	0	9	25	DNS	DNF	0	0	—	34
57	Clare Egan (USA)	25	0	0	0	0	—	9	0	0	34
58	Karolin Horchler (GER)	0	—	—	—	0	32	0	—	—	32
59	Synnøve Solemdal (NOR)	3	7	7	8	—	0	—	7	0	32
60	Iryna Kryuko (BLR)	0	0	0	0	0	—	28	0	3	31
61	Paulína Fialková (SVK)	2	0	3	26	DNS	—	—	0	0	31
62	Natalya Burdyga (UKR)	—	14	0	2	0	0	15	—	—	31
63	Elisabeth Högberg (SWE)	26	0	0	—	2	—	—	—	—	28
64	Tang Jialin (CHN)	0	0	0	0	—	—	—	26	—	26
65	Hilde Fenne (NOR)	—	0	23	0	—	0	0	—	—	23
66	Anastasia Zagoruiko (RUS)	—	—	—	—	0	—	—	—	23	23
67	Aita Gasparin (SUI)	6	0	0	0	16	0	0	0	0	22
68	Alina Raikova (KAZ)	—	—	—	0	—	21	0	—	—	21
69	Weronika Nowakowska (POL)	20	0	0	0	0	0	0	0	—	20
70	Lena Häcki (SUI)	0	0	0	0	—	—	—	20	0	20
71	Desislava Stoyanova (BUL)	0	0	0	0	19	—	0	0	0	19
72	Irene Cadurisch (SUI)	—	—	0	0	17	0	DNS	0	—	17
73	Annelies Cook (USA)	16	0	0	0	0	0	—	0	—	16
74	Nadiia Bielkina (UKR)	11	5	—	—	—	—	—	—	—	16
75	Zina Kocher (CAN)	14	—	—	0	0	0	0	0	—	14
76	Darya Usanova (KAZ)	0	0	0	—	0	0	—	14	0	14
77	Jitka Landová (CZE)	0	0	13	0	—	—	—	—	—	13
78	Coline Varcin (FRA)	13	0	—	—	0	—	—	—	—	13
79	Nadzeya Pisareva (BLR)	12	0	1	—	DNS	—	—	—	—	13
80	Ingrid Landmark Tandrevold (NOR)	—	—	—	—	—	—	—	—	12	12
81	Anna Kistanova (KAZ)	0	0	0	0	0	8	3	0	0	11
82	Marine Bolliet (FRA)	0	10	—	—	—	—	—	—	—	10
83	Nadine Horchler (GER)	—	—	—	—	—	—	—	—	10	10
84	Christina Rieder (AUT)	—	—	—	—	0	9	0	0	—	9
85	Susanne Hoffmann (AUT)	—	—	0	0	0	5	0	4	0	9
86	Jessica Jislova (CZE)	—	—	—	—	0	7	0	0	0	7
87	Johanna Talihärm (EST)	0	0	0	—	—	0	6	—	—	6
88	Sanna Markkanen (FRA)	—	0	0	—	6	0	0	0	—	6
89	Hanna Sola (BLR)	4	—	0	0	—	0	—	0	—	4
90	Dunja Zdouc (AUT)	0	0	0	0	—	4	0	0	—	4
91	Sarah Beaudry (CAN)	—	—	—	0	—	3	—	0	—	3
92	Anja Eržen (SLO)	0	0	0	0	0	2	0	0	0	2
93	Terézia Poliaková (SVK)	0	0	0	0	0	—	0	2	—	2
94	Martina Chrapánová (SVK)	0	0	—	—	—	2	0	—	—	2
95	Kinga Mitoraj (POL)	2	0	—	—	—	—	—	—	—	2
96	Mun Ji-hee (KOR)	0	0	0	0	0	0	0	0	1	1
