= 2015–16 Biathlon World Cup – Overall Women =

== 2014–15 Top 3 standings ==
Medal	Athlete	Points
Gold:	(Belarus) Darya Domracheva	1092
Silver:	(Finland) Kaisa Mäkäräinen	1044
Bronze:	(Ukraine) Valj Semerenko	865

== Events summary ==
Event	Winner	Second	Third
Östersund 15 km Individual details	Dorothea Wierer; Italy	Marie Dorin Habert; France	Olena Pidhrushna; Ukraine
Östersund 7.5 km Sprint details	Gabriela Soukalová; Czech Republic	Federica Sanfilippo; Italy	Olena Pidhrushna; Ukraine
Östersund 10 km Pursuit details	Kaisa Mäkäräinen; Finland	Dorothea Wierer; Italy	Franziska Hildebrand; Germany
Hochfilzen 7.5 km Sprint details	Franziska Hildebrand; Germany	Maren Hammerschmidt; Germany	Miriam Gössner; Germany
Hochfilzen 10 km Pursuit details	Laura Dahlmeier; Germany	Maren Hammerschmidt; Germany	Gabriela Soukalová; Czech Republic
Pokljuka 7.5 km Sprint details	Marie Dorin Habert; France	Laura Dahlmeier; Germany	Franziska Hildebrand; Germany
Pokljuka 10 km Pursuit details	Laura Dahlmeier; Germany	Marie Dorin Habert; France	Kaisa Mäkäräinen; Finland
Pokljuka 12.5 km Mass start details	Kaisa Mäkäräinen; Finland	Gabriela Soukalová; Czech Republic	Olga Podchufarova; Russia
Ruhpolding 7.5 km Sprint details	Franziska Hildebrand; Germany	Gabriela Soukalová; Czech Republic	Kaisa Mäkäräinen; Finland
Ruhpolding 10 km Pursuit details	Laura Dahlmeier; Germany	Gabriela Soukalová; Czech Republic	Dorothea Wierer; Italy
Ruhpolding 12.5 km Mass start details	Laura Dahlmeier; Germany	Marie Dorin Habert; France	Tiril Eckhoff; Norway
Ruhpolding (2) 15 km Individual details	Dorothea Wierer; Italy	Kaisa Mäkäräinen; Finland	Gabriela Soukalová; Czech Republic
Ruhpolding (2) 12.5 km Mass start details	Gabriela Soukalová; Czech Republic	Franziska Hildebrand; Germany	Laura Dahlmeier; Germany
Antholz-Anterselva 7.5 km Sprint details	Olga Podchufarova; Russia	Dorothea Wierer; Italy	Ekaterina Yurlova; Russia
Antholz-Anterselva 10 km Pursuit details	Ekaterina Yurlova; Russia	Selina Gasparin; Switzerland	Dorothea Wierer; Italy
Canmore 7.5 km Sprint details	Olena Pidhrushna; Ukraine	Krystyna Guzik; Poland	Dorothea Wierer; Italy
Canmore 12.5 km Mass start details	Dorothea Wierer; Italy	Marie Dorin Habert; France	Gabriela Soukalová; Czech Republic
Presque Isle 7.5 km Sprint details	Gabriela Soukalová; Czech Republic	Susan Dunklee; United States	Krystyna Guzik; Poland
Presque Isle 10 km Pursuit details	Gabriela Soukalová; Czech Republic	Kaisa Mäkäräinen; Finland	Marie Dorin Habert; France
World Championships 7.5 km Sprint details	Tiril Eckhoff; Norway	Marie Dorin Habert; France	Laura Dahlmeier; Germany
World Championships 10 km Pursuit details	Laura Dahlmeier; Germany	Dorothea Wierer; Italy	Marie Dorin Habert; France
World Championships 15 km Individual details	Marie Dorin Habert; France	Anaïs Bescond; France	Laura Dahlmeier; Germany
World Championships 12.5 km Mass start details	Marie Dorin Habert; France	Laura Dahlmeier; Germany	Kaisa Mäkäräinen; Finland
Khanty-Mansiysk 7.5 km Sprint details	Kaisa Mäkäräinen; Finland	Gabriela Soukalová; Czech Republic	Marte Olsbu; Norway
Khanty-Mansiysk 10 km Pursuit details	Kaisa Mäkäräinen; Finland	Marie Dorin Habert; France	Dorothea Wierer; Italy
Khanty-Mansiysk 12.5 km Mass start details	Cancelled		

== Standings ==
For each event, a first place gives 60 points, a 2nd place 54 pts, a 3rd place 48 pts, a 4th place 43 pts, a fifth place 40 pts, a 6th place 38 pts, 7th 36 pts 8th 34 points, 9th 32 points, 10th 31 points, then linearly decreasing by one point down to the 40th place. Equal placings (ties) give an equal number of points. The sum of all WC points of the season, minus the points from 2 events in which the biathlete got the worst scores, gives the biathlete's total WC score.

#	Name	ÖST IN	ÖST SP	ÖST PU	HOC SP	HOC PU	POK SP	POK PU	POK MS	RU1 SP	RU1 PU	RU1 MS	RU2 IN	RU2 MS	ANT SP	ANT PU	CAN SP	CAN MS	PRE SP	PRE PU	OSL SP	OSL PU	OSL IN	OSL MS	KHA SP	KHA PU	KHA MS	Total
1.	Gabriela Soukalová (CZE)	40	60	40	34	48	40	43	54	54	54	36	48	60	~~32~~	36	36	48	60	60	43	~~30~~	40	43	54	43	—	1074
2	Marie Dorin Habert (FRA)	54	38	43	31	29	60	54	36	29	40	54	38	32	38	~~15~~	~~12~~	54	43	48	54	48	60	60	31	54	—	1028
3	Dorothea Wierer (ITA)	60	~~21~~	54	25	34	25	30	21	38	48	~~12~~	60	34	54	48	48	60	36	32	40	54	34	21	40	48	—	944
4	Kaisa Mäkäräinen (FIN)	17	31	60	~~13~~	18	31	48	60	48	28	28	54	—	23	20	31	43	40	54	32	36	22	48	60	60	—	892
5	Franziska Hildebrand (GER)	31	24	48	60	43	48	29	24	60	32	24	43	54	22	14	0	40	—	—	31	43	38	27	30	28	—	793
6	Laura Dahlmeier (GER)	—	—	—	38	60	54	60	30	43	60	60	32	48	—	—	25	36	—	—	48	60	48	54	5	25	—	786
7	Olena Pidhrushna (UKR)	48	48	31	27	23	~~0~~	~~DNS~~	38	36	31	40	25	26	40	27	60	31	27	36	25	40	DNF	23	36	36	—	754
8	Veronika Vítková (CZE)	36	27	34	9	11	43	36	43	32	36	32	27	6	34	28	26	23	31	38	36	34	43	38	~~0~~	~~DNF~~	—	703
9	Anaïs Bescond (FRA)	32	0	—	43	25	14	15	22	20	8	43	21	21	43	31	17	38	34	23	29	29	54	40	34	30	—	666
10	Krystyna Guzik (POL)	30	~~0~~	17	22	21	34	~~DNF~~	20	17	11	18	30	30	15	40	54	14	48	43	0	DNS	36	22	22	22	—	566
11	Tiril Eckhoff (NOR)	43	40	32	11	40	2	7	29	24	43	48	20	43	21	43	—	—	—	—	60	24	0	14	—	—	—	544
12	Franziska Preuß (GER)	22	43	38	20	30	32	40	31	—	—	—	—	—	—	—	38	30	5	27	27	38	—	34	38	40	—	533
13	Yuliia Dzhima (UKR)	23	28	13	36	38	22	19	23	34	34	30	12	36	26	DNS	~~0~~	—	0	0	10	32	19	12	15	32	—	494
14	Susan Dunklee (USA)	0	~~0~~	—	0	10	38	31	18	30	26	38	0	18	4	24	6	2	54	40	34	31	23	30	16	19	—	492
15	Lisa Theresa Hauser (AUT)	34	30	12	29	28	12	1	34	14	29	16	~~0~~	~~DNF~~	13	10	0	27	13	29	25	21	28	20	25	29	—	479
16	Olga Podchufarova (RUS)	16	7	14	24	36	4	27	48	40	30	23	31	29	60	34	10	—	25	DNS	0	—	—	—	—	—	—	458
17	Karin Oberhofer (ITA)	0	34	26	32	~~0~~	21	28	14	6	25	26	0	31	36	38	19	21	12	21	5	10	15	—	13	20	—	453
18	Magdalena Gwizdoń (POL)	21	17	27	~~6~~	16	27	23	8	15	15	34	10	27	29	13	23	10	24	26	~~0~~	11	29	16	19	9	—	449
19	Nadezhda Skardino (BLR)	38	0	15	19	31	20	22	40	12	DNS	20	29	38	12	23	—	—	—	—	9	0	26	31	32	26	—	443
20	Ekaterina Yurlova (RUS)	0	—	—	21	27	11	6	—	11	20	—	22	—	48	60	0	22	29	31	22	20	30	28	9	23	—	440
21	Justine Braisaz (FRA)	15	18	28	16	DNS	0	9	—	27	0	—	0	—	27	26	11	12	10	10	16	19	25	29	43	31	—	372
22	Marte Olsbu (NOR)	0	15	36	0	—	0	12	—	16	22	—	8	—	30	12	0	28	—	—	30	25	0	36	48	34	—	352
23	Miriam Gössner (GER)	8	23	30	48	26	26	0	2	0	3	14	0	25	31	21	14	34	19	0	—	—	—	—	26	0	—	350
24	Selina Gasparin (SUI)	4	0	2	30	9	DNS	—	—	7	4	—	40	28	25	54	0	4	38	15	0	—	24	—	27	21	—	332
25	Maren Hammerschmidt (GER)	0	0	9	54	54	36	25	27	0	0	2	19	40	—	—	—	—	—	—	—	—	14	—	17	24	—	321
26	Monika Hojnisz (POL)	20	5	1	0	0	30	24	26	13	10	29	5	20	28	25	43	6	0	—	0	12	1	—	0	8	—	306
27	Vanessa Hinz (GER)	0	32	29	26	12	28	38	32	28	12	22	17	24	0	—	—	—	—	—	0	—	4	—	0	0	—	304
28	Eva Puskarčíková (CZE)	0	0	19	17	1	29	32	28	21	23	25	0	16	14	18	0	29	16	4	—	—	—	—	—	—	—	292
29	Fanny Horn Birkeland (NOR)	27	8	7	23	32	—	—	—	11	6	—	9	—	1	0	—	—	—	—	0	22	10	32	28	38	—	254
30	Daria Virolaynen (RUS)	0	0	—	1	3	17	21	10	31	19	6	11	—	9	29	29	32	1	DNS	3	4	0	—	21	5	—	252
#	Name	ÖST IN	ÖST SP	ÖST PU	HOC SP	HOC PU	POK SP	POK PU	POK MS	RU1 SP	RU1 PU	RU1 MS	RU2 IN	RU2 MS	ANT SP	ANT PU	CAN SP	CAN MS	PRE SP	PRE PU	OSL SP	OSL PU	OSL IN	OSL MS	KHA SP	KHA PU	KHA MS	Total
31	Lucie Charvátová (CZE)	0	0	—	40	19	24	26	6	0	21	8	0	—	0	0	DSQ	—	22	16	8	23	0	—	11	0	—	224
32	Rosanna Crawford (CAN)	28	19	18	2	6	18	0	—	—	—	—	23	22	8	0	0	—	—	—	12	14	27	26	0	—	—	223
33	Fuyuko Tachizaki (JPN)	24	0	—	15	13	0	2	—	22	18	31	0	—	0	—	30	20	0	9	0	0	20	—	18	0	—	222
34	Iryna Varvynets (UKR)	—	—	—	—	—	8	17	—	0	—	—	0	—	3	DNS	34	24	8	14	28	27	32	25	0	0	—	220
35	Olga Abramova (UKR)	25	36	24	28	17	0	13	16	0	16	10	DNS	14	5	9	—	—	—	—	—	—	—	—	—	—	—	213
36	Paulína Fialková (SVK)	0	2	21	0	—	3	16	—	26	38	27	36	12	DNS	—	—	—	—	—	0	18	0	—	0	0	—	199
37	Federica Sanfilippo (ITA)	11	54	0	0	—	20	14	12	4	0	—	34	DNS	0	—	15	8	7	DNS	0	0	0	—	—	—	—	179
37	Mona Brorsson (SWE)	0	0	10	0	0	5	0	—	1	13	—	16	—	0	16	0	—	11	24	38	2	12	6	8	17	—	179
39	Anaïs Chevalier (FRA)	—	—	—	—	—	6	0	—	—	—	—	4	—	18	30	16	—	0	20	15	26	13	2	0	10	—	160
39	Lisa Vittozzi (ITA)	—	0	0	4	DNS	0	—	—	—	—	—	0	—	11	7	24	—	0	12	21	28	—	24	14	15	—	160
41	Galina Vishnevskaya (KAZ)	7	0	0	0	—	0	—	—	—	—	—	26	8	0	0	—	—	23	19	17	16	17	18	7	DNS	—	158
42	Ekaterina Shumilova (RUS)	13	0	11	18	22	0	—	—	18	7	—	7	—	—	—	20	—	2	25	—	—	6	—	6	2	—	157
43	Jana Gereková (SVK)	6	29	20	3	4	16	0	—	23	27	4	14	—	0	0	0	—	0	DNS	1	0	3	—	0	—	—	150
43	Synnøve Solemdal (NOR)	0	3	23	7	8	7	18	—	8	1	—	28	23	—	—	0	—	—	—	7	17	—	—	0	0	—	150
45	Tatiana Akimova (RUS)	—	0	—	0	—	—	—	—	9	0	—	—	—	0	6	18	—	4	22	13	15	2	—	29	27	—	145
46	Teja Gregorin (SLO)	2	10	0	0	14	0	20	—	—	—	—	—	—	7	0	0	—	20	5	11	0	18	—	20	16	—	143
47	Valj Semerenko (UKR)	—	0	—	8	DNS	15	11	4	0	24	—	15	—	20	32	—	—	—	—	0	—	0	10	DNS	—	—	139
48	Celia Aymonier (FRA)	—	—	—	0	0	0	0	—	—	—	—	2	—	10	11	28	26	30	30	0	—	—	—	0	0	—	137
49	Baiba Bendika (LAT)	0	0	—	0	0	0	—	—	0	—	—	0	—	0	0	40	18	26	28	0	—	0	—	4	6	—	122
50	Natassia Dubarezava (BLR)	29	0	—	0	—	0	—	—	3	0	—	DNF	—	—	—	—	—	17	0	18	0	7	—	24	11	—	109
51	Darya Yurkevich (BLR)	0	22	0	12	0	0	0	—	19	14	—	24	10	0	—	0	—	—	—	—	—	0	—	0	1	—	102
52	Julia Ransom (CAN)	0	9	5	0	0	10	0	—	0	0	—	0	—	0	22	22	—	—	—	0	0	21	—	0	7	—	96
53	Hannah Dreissigacker (USA)	0	0	—	0	—	0	—	—	—	—	—	—	—	—	—	13	—	14	17	23	5	8	8	—	—	—	88
54	Iryna Kryuko (BLR)	19	0	—	0	—	0	10	—	0	0	—	0	—	0	0	—	—	28	7	0	—	0	—	3	18	—	85
55	Hilde Fenne (NOR)	—	—	—	0	2	23	34	25	0	—	—	—	—	—	—	0	—	0	—	—	—	—	—	—	—	—	84
56	Kaia Wøien Nicolaisen (NOR)	DNS	—	—	—	—	—	—	—	—	—	—	—	—	0	DNS	0	—	32	34	—	—	0	—	3	14	—	83
57	Natalya Burdyga (UKR)	14	—	—	14	20	0	4	—	2	0	—	0	—	0	0	0	—	15	13	—	—	—	—	—	—	—	82
58	Ingela Andersson (SWE)	—	—	—	—	—	—	—	—	—	—	—	13	—	0	3	0	—	18	3	19	9	9	4	0	3	—	81
58	Linn Persson (SWE)	12	0	3	0	—	0	0	—	5	5	—	0	—	24	19	DNS	—	0	—	7	1	5	—	0	—	—	81
60	Luise Kummer (GER)	—	—	—	—	—	—	—	—	0	0	—	—	—	—	—	27	25	21	6	—	—	—	—	—	—	—	79
#	Name	ÖST IN	ÖST SP	ÖST PU	HOC SP	HOC PU	POK SP	POK PU	POK MS	RU1 SP	RU1 PU	RU1 MS	RU2 IN	RU2 MS	ANT SP	ANT PU	CAN SP	CAN MS	PRE SP	PRE PU	OSL SP	OSL PU	OSL IN	OSL MS	KHA SP	KHA PU	KHA MS	Total
61	Elisabeth Högberg (SWE)	0	26	25	0	24	0	—	—	—	—	—	—	—	2	0	—	—	—	—	—	—	—	—	—	—	—	77
61	Mari Laukkanen (FIN)	DNF	0	—	0	0	9	5	—	25	17	21	DNS	—	DNS	—	DNF	—	0	—	0	0	—	—	—	—	—	77
63	Karolin Horchler (GER)	0	0	4	—	—	—	—	—	—	—	—	0	—	0	17	32	16	0	0	—	—	—	—	—	—	—	69
64	Anastasia Zagoruiko (RUS)	—	—	—	—	—	—	—	—	—	—	—	3	—	0	8	—	—	—	—	—	—	16	—	23	13	—	63
65	Darya Usanova (KAZ)	26	0	8	0	—	0	—	—	—	—	—	—	—	0	0	0	—	—	—	14	6	0	—	0	DNS	—	54
66	Zhang Yan (CHN)	18	0	0	0	—	0	8	—	0	9	—	18	—	—	—	—	—	—	—	0	0	0	—	—	—	—	53
67	Clare Egan (USA)	0	25	0	0	—	0	—	—	0	—	—	0	—	0	—	—	—	9	18	0	—	0	—	0	—	—	52
68	Tang Jialin (CHN)	0	0	0	0	—	0	—	—	0	0	—	1	—	—	—	—	—	—	—	26	7	11	—	—	—	—	45
69	Alexia Runggaldier (ITA)	—	—	—	—	—	—	—	—	0	2	—	6	—	—	—	—	—	—	—	—	—	31	—	—	—	—	39
70	Weronika Nowakowska-Ziemniak (POL)	0	20	0	0	15	0	—	—	0	0	—	0	—	0	—	0	—	0	DNS	0	—	0	—	—	—	—	35
71	Aita Gasparin (SUI)	0	6	0	0	—	0	0	—	0	0	—	0	—	16	1	0	—	0	8	0	—	0	—	0	0	—	31
71	Lena Häcki (SUI)	0	0	0	0	0	0	3	—	0	0	—	0	—	—	—	—	—	—	—	20	8	0	—	0	0	—	31
73	Dunja Zdouc (AUT)	0	0	—	0	—	0	—	—	0	—	—	—	—	—	—	4	—	0	11	0	13	0	—	—	—	—	28
74	Desislava Stoyanova (BUL)	0	0	—	0	DNS	0	—	—	0	—	—	0	—	19	5	—	—	0	DNS	0	0	0	—	0	—	—	24
75	Coline Varcin (FRA)	0	13	6	0	—	—	—	—	—	—	—	—	—	0	4	—	—	—	—	—	—	—	—	—	—	—	23
76	Jitka Landová (CZE)	9	0	—	0	0	13	0	—	0	0	—	0	—	—	—	—	—	—	—	—	—	—	—	—	—	—	22
76	Marine Bolliet (FRA)	5	0	—	10	7	—	—	—	—	—	—	—	—	—	—	—	—	—	—	—	—	—	—	—	—	—	22
76	Nadine Horchler (GER)	—	—	—	—	—	—	—	—	—	—	—	—	—	—	—	—	—	—	—	—	—	—	—	10	12	—	22
76	Éva Tófalvi (ROU)	—	0	22	0	DNS	0	0	—	—	—	—	0	—	0	0	DNS	—	0	—	0	0	0	—	0	—	—	22
80	Alina Raikova (KAZ)	0	—	—	—	—	—	—	—	0	—	—	0	—	—	—	21	—	0	0	—	—	0	—	—	—	—	21
80	Nadiia Bielkina (UKR)	0	11	0	5	5	—	—	—	—	—	—	—	—	—	—	—	—	—	—	—	—	—	—	—	—	—	21
82	Irene Cadurisch (SUI)	—	—	—	—	—	0	—	—	0	—	—	0	—	17	2	0	—	DNS	—	0	0	0	—	—	—	—	19
83	Annelies Cook (USA)	0	16	0	0	—	0	—	—	0	0	—	0	—	0	—	0	—	—	—	0	—	0	—	—	—	—	16
83	Ingrid Landmark Tandrevold (NOR)	—	—	—	—	—	—	—	—	—	—	—	—	—	—	—	—	—	—	—	—	—	—	—	12	4	—	16
83	Johanna Talihaerm (EST)	10	0	—	0	—	0	—	—	—	—	—	—	—	—	—	0	—	6	0	—	—	—	—	—	—	—	16
83	Megan Tandy (CAN)	0	0	16	0	0	0	DNF	—	—	—	—	0	—	0	—	—	—	—	—	—	—	—	—	—	—	—	16
87	Zina Kocher (CAN)	0	14	0	—	—	—	—	—	0	—	—	0	—	0	—	0	—	0	0	0	—	0	—	—	—	—	14
88	Nadzeya Pisareva (BLR)	0	12	0	0	0	1	DNS	—	—	—	—	0	—	DNS	—	—	—	—	—	—	—	—	—	—	—	—	13
89	Anna Kistanova (KAZ)	—	0	0	0	—	0	0	—	0	0	—	0	—	0	0	8	—	3	0	0	—	—	—	0	DNS	—	11
90	Christina Rieder (AUT)	—	—	—	—	—	—	—	—	—	—	—	—	—	0	—	9	—	0	0	0	—	—	—	—	—	—	9
#	Name	ÖST IN	ÖST SP	ÖST PU	HOC SP	HOC PU	POK SP	POK PU	POK MS	RU1 SP	RU1 PU	RU1 MS	RU2 IN	RU2 MS	ANT SP	ANT PU	CAN SP	CAN MS	PRE SP	PRE PU	OSL SP	OSL PU	OSL IN	OSL MS	KHA SP	KHA PU	KHA MS	Total
90	Susanne Hoffmann (AUT)	—	—	—	—	—	0	—	—	0	—	—	0	—	0	0	5	—	0	0	4	0	—	—	0	0	—	9
92	Jessica Jislová (CZE)	—	—	—	—	—	—	—	—	—	—	—	—	—	0	0	7	—	0	—	0	0	—	—	0	0	—	7
93	Sanna Markkanen (FIN)	—	—	—	0	—	0	—	—	—	—	—	—	—	6	0	0	—	0	—	0	—	0	—	—	—	—	6
94	Terézia Poliaková (SVK)	3	0	—	0	—	0	0	—	0	—	—	0	—	0	—	—	—	—	—	2	0	—	—	—	—	—	5
95	Hanna Sola (BLR)	—	4	DNF	—	—	0	DNS	—	0	—	—	DNS	—	—	—	0	—	—	—	0	—	—	—	—	—	—	4
96	Emilia Yordanova (BUL)	0	0	—	0	—	0	—	—	0	—	—	0	—	0	—	—	—	0	—	0	3	0	—	0	—	—	3
96	Sarah Beaudry (CAN)	—	—	—	—	—	—	—	—	0	0	—	—	—	—	—	3	—	—	—	0	—	0	—	—	—	—	3
98	Andreja Mali (SLO)	0	DNS	—	0	—	0	—	—	—	—	—	0	—	0	—	0	—	0	2	0	0	0	—	—	—	—	2
98	Anja Eržen (SLO)	0	0	—	0	—	0	—	—	0	—	—	0	—	0	—	2	—	0	—	0	0	0	—	0	0	—	2
98	Kinga Mitoraj (POL)	0	2	0	0	—	—	—	—	—	—	—	DNS	—	—	—	—	—	—	—	—	—	—	—	—	—	—	2
98	Martina Chrapánová (SVK)	0	0	—	0	—	—	—	—	—	—	—	—	—	—	—	2	—	0	—	—	—	0	—	—	—	—	2
102	Anna Magnusson (SWE)	1	0	—	0	0	0	—	—	—	—	—	—	—	—	—	—	—	—	—	0	0	—	—	—	—	—	1
102	Iana Bondar (UKR)	0	0	—	—	—	—	—	—	—	—	—	—	—	—	—	0	—	0	1	—	—	—	—	0	0	—	1
102	Mun Ji-hee (KOR)	0	0	—	0	—	0	—	—	0	—	—	0	—	0	—	0	—	0	—	0	—	0	—	1	0	—	1
