= Biathlon European Championships 2012 – Women's sprint =

The women's sprint competition of the Biathlon European Championships 2012 was held on January 28, 2012 at 13:00 local time.

== Results ==
Place	Name	Penalties	Time
1	(Ukraine) Olena Pidhrushna	0+0	20:23,0
2	(Ukraine) Valj Semerenko	1+1	+29,4
3	(Poland) Weronika Nowakowska-Ziemniak	0+1	+35,3
4	(Germany) Nadine Horchler	0+0	+44,9
5	(Kazakhstan) Darya Usanova	0+1	+46,2
6	(Russia) Ekaterina Shumilova	1+1	+49,0
7	(Germany) Carolin Hennecke	0+0	+50,6
8	(Russia) Anastasia Zagoruiko	1+1	+1:00,1
9	(Germany) Juliane Döll	1+1	+1:19,6
10	(Austria) Romana Schrempf	0+2	+1:23,3
11	(Norway) Marie Hov	0+1	+1:27,2
12	(Czech Republic) Barbora Tomešová	0+1	+1:29,9
13	(Germany) Maren Hammerschmidt	1+1	+1:32,9
14	(Russia) Aleksandra Alikina	1+1	+1:34,7
15	(Czech Republic) Gabriela Soukalová	2+0	+1:35,4
16	(Estonia) Grete Gaim	0+0	+1:37,9
17	(Czech Republic) Veronika Zvařičová	0+1	+1:41,0
18	(Canada) Megan Heinicke	1+0	+1:44,2
19	(Italy) Federica Sanfilippo	1+1	+1:46,5
20	(Belarus) Darja Jurkewitsch	0+1	+1:47,7
21	(Norway) Ane Skrove Nossum	2+1	+1:51,2
22	(Poland) Karolina Pitoń	1+0	+1:52,5
23	(Ukraine) Tetiana Trachuk	0+0	+2:03,2
24	(Germany) Karolin Horchler	0+0	+2:05,4
25	(Ukraine) Juliya Dzhyma	1+2	+2:07,3
26	(Norway) Ane Sandaker Kvittingen	1+2	+2:18,3
27	(Russia) Evgenia Sedowa	3+1	+2:20,3
28	(Belarus) Ala Talkatsch	1+1	+2:26,0
29	(Bulgaria) Emilia Jordanowa	0+3	+2:26,2
30	(Slovakia) Martina Chrapánová	0+2	+2:30,4
31	(Slovakia) Terézia Poliaková	0+1	+2:33,9
32	(United States) Laura Spector	0+2	+2:39,7
33	(United States) Hanah Dreissigacker	1+2	+2:52,2
34	(Spain) Victoria Padial Hernández	0+2	+2:57,8
35	(South Korea) Kim Kyung-nam	1+0	+3:01,1
36	(Slovenia) Lili Drčar	0+3	+3:03,7
37	(Poland) Katarzyna Leja	0+2	+3:24,5
38	(Lithuania) Aliona Sabaliauskienė	1+0	+3:30,3
39	(Latvia) Žanna Juškāne	0+4	+3:34,6
40	(Romania) Réka Ferencz	1+3	+3:50,7
41	(Bulgaria) Dafinka Koeva	0+3	+3:52,8
42	(Czech Republic) Lea Johanidesová	1+2	+3:53,6
43	(Slovakia) Lucia Simová	1+2	+4:02,3
44	(Finland) Laura Toivanen	0+2	+4:03,7
45	(Belarus) Anastasiya Kalei	0+1	+4:04,7
46	(Poland) Beata Szymańczak	1+1	+4:15,6
47	(Belarus) Maryia Kolesen	1+2	+4:46,0
48	(Slovakia) Natália Prekopová	1+3	+4:49,5
49	(Estonia) Daria Yurlova	3+3	+4:49,0
50	(Moldova) Alexandra Camenscic	1+1	+5:15,7
51	(Hungary) Anett Bozsik	3+1	+13:45,3
52	(Serbia) Jelena Radivojević	4+5	+18:15,4
dnf	(Serbia) Jelena Novoselac
