= 2012–13 Biathlon World Cup – Overall Women =

== 2011–12 Top 3 Standings ==
Medal	Athlete	Points
Gold:	(Germany) Magdalena Neuner	1216
Silver:	(Belarus) Darya Domracheva	1188
Bronze:	(Norway) Tora Berger	1054

== Events summary ==
Event:	Winner:	Second:	Third:
Östersund 15 km Individual details	Tora Berger; Norway	Darya Domracheva; Belarus	Ekaterina Glazyrina; Russia
Östersund 7.5 km Sprint details	Tora Berger; Norway	Olena Pidhrushna; Ukraine	Olga Vilukhina; Russia
Östersund 10 km Pursuit details	Tora Berger; Norway	Darya Domracheva; Belarus	Andrea Henkel; Germany
Hochfilzen 7.5 km Sprint details	Darya Domracheva; Belarus	Kaisa Mäkäräinen; Finland	Tora Berger; Norway
Hochfilzen 10 km Pursuit details	Synnøve Solemdal; Norway	Tora Berger; Norway	Kaisa Mäkäräinen; Finland
Pokljuka 7.5 km Sprint details	Gabriela Soukalová; Czech Republic	Miriam Gössner; Germany	Nadezhda Skardino; Belarus
Pokljuka 10 km Pursuit details	Miriam Gössner; Germany	Gabriela Soukalová; Czech Republic	Marie Dorin Habert; France
Pokljuka 12.5 km Mass start details	Tora Berger; Norway	Miriam Gössner; Germany	Gabriela Soukalová; Czech Republic
Oberhof 7.5 km Sprint details	Miriam Gössner; Germany	Tora Berger; Norway	Andrea Henkel; Germany
Oberhof 10 km Pursuit details	Olga Zaitseva; Russia	Veronika Vítková; Czech Republic	Valj Semerenko; Ukraine
Ruhpolding 7.5 km Sprint details	Miriam Gössner; Germany	Darya Domracheva; Belarus	Kaisa Mäkäräinen; Finland
Ruhpolding 12.5 km Mass start details	Tora Berger; Norway	Darya Domracheva; Belarus	Olga Zaitseva; Russia
Antholz 7.5 km Sprint details	Anastasiya Kuzmina; Slovakia	Kaisa Mäkäräinen; Finland	Darya Domracheva; Belarus
Antholz 10 km Pursuit details	Tora Berger; Norway	Olena Pidhrushna; Ukraine	Kaisa Mäkäräinen; Finland
World Championships 7.5 km Sprint details	Olena Pidhrushna; Ukraine	Tora Berger; Norway	Vita Semerenko; Ukraine
World Championships 10 km Pursuit details	Tora Berger; Norway	Krystyna Pałka; Poland	Olena Pidhrushna; Ukraine
World Championships 15 km Individual details	Tora Berger; Norway	Andrea Henkel; Germany	Valj Semerenko; Ukraine
World Championships 12.5 km Mass start details	Darya Domracheva; Belarus	Tora Berger; Norway	Monika Hojnisz; Poland
Holmenkollen 7.5 km Sprint details	Tora Berger; Norway	Darya Domracheva; Belarus	Anastasiya Kuzmina; Slovakia
Holmenkollen 10 km Pursuit details	Tora Berger; Norway	Marie Dorin Habert; France	Anastasiya Kuzmina; Slovakia
Holmenkollen 12.5 km Mass start details	Tora Berger; Norway	Anastasiya Kuzmina; Slovakia	Darya Domracheva; Belarus
Sochi 15 km Individual details	Darya Domracheva; Belarus	Olga Zaitseva; Russia	Tora Berger; Norway
Sochi 7.5 km Sprint details	Magdalena Gwizdoń; Poland	Anastasiya Kuzmina; Slovakia	Tora Berger; Norway
Khanty-Mansiysk 7.5 km Sprint details	Gabriela Soukalová; Czech Republic	Andrea Henkel; Germany	Miriam Gössner; Germany
Khanty-Mansiysk 10 km Pursuit details	Gabriela Soukalová; Czech Republic	Olga Vilukhina; Russia	Tora Berger; Norway
Khanty-Mansiysk 12.5 km Mass start details	Gabriela Soukalová; Czech Republic	Marie Dorin Habert; France	Kaisa Mäkäräinen; Finland

== Standings ==
#	Name	ÖST IN	ÖST SP	ÖST PU	HOC SP	HOC PU	POK SP	POK PU	POK MS	OBE SP	OBE PU	RUH SP	RUH MS	ANT SP	ANT PU	WCH SP	WCH PU	WCH IN	WCH MS	HOL SP	HOL PU	HOL MS	SOC IN	SOC SP	KHM SP	KHM PU	KHM MS	Total
1.	Tora Berger (NOR)	60	60	60	48	54	~~14~~	32	60	54	43	29	60	~~27~~	60	54	60	60	54	60	60	60	48	48	34	48	28	1234
2	Darya Domracheva (BLR)	54	36	54	60	40	—	—	20	31	40	54	54	48	31	0	16	8	60	54	40	48	60	40	28	30	18	924
3	Andrea Henkel (GER)	34	40	48	24	24	36	36	30	48	36	43	28	16	29	~~8~~	38	54	28	38	32	29	43	0	54	36	32	856
4	Marie Dorin Habert (FRA)	22	~~3~~	24	31	36	40	48	32	43	32	40	29	36	~~15~~	23	25	32	32	43	54	28	30	43	23	43	54	843
5	Kaisa Mäkäräinen (FIN)	32	~~6~~	~~14~~	54	48	19	22	27	21	34	48	38	54	48	32	31	34	24	20	24	34	38	32	38	34	48	834
6	Gabriela Soukalová (CZE)	31	27	28	27	30	60	54	48	—	—	30	11	31	28	27	21	29	23	27	6	24	34	24	60	60	60	800
7	Anastasiya Kuzmina (SVK)	29	22	34	14	28	24	10	28	~~8~~	22	0	32	60	27	24	27	43	26	48	48	54	32	54	40	26	17	769
8	Olena Pidhrushna (UKR)	8	54	40	21	29	15	43	16	20	27	22	31	43	54	60	48	30	30	40	0	40	15	0	30	24	24	764
9	Miriam Gössner (GER)	30	0	18	32	38	54	60	54	60	31	60	34	0	—	38	20	6	38	17	—	22	6	28	48	40	12	746
10	Vita Semerenko (UKR)	20	14	16	30	32	43	34	21	28	29	23	43	—	—	48	32	40	43	34	29	38	10	25	36	31	40	739
11	Olga Zaitseva (RUS)	15	43	19	0	20	0	30	43	40	60	24	48	32	26	43	43	38	40	—	—	—	54	31	22	28	19	718
12	Olga Vilukhina (RUS)	40	48	43	16	25	18	31	34	36	26	7	27	38	43	40	19	31	18	—	—	—	0	26	43	54	43	706
13	Teja Gregorin (SLO)	26	24	20	36	43	13	27	38	0	16	10	40	30	34	~~2~~	9	16	34	32	36	32	31	34	20	25	27	653
14	Krystyna Pałka (POL)	36	25	30	40	22	12	24	36	10	14	28	26	28	19	36	54	19	36	25	43	19	—	~~2~~	18	17	29	645
15	Magdalena Gwizdoń (POL)	16	21	23	38	26	38	29	15	0	0	14	19	26	30	29	29	23	14	28	25	31	40	60	25	20	13	632
16	Veronika Vítková (CZE)	10	32	36	0	0	34	40	25	25	54	21	24	0	18	31	34	27	22	0	—	27	0	12	4	15	20	511
17	Anaïs Bescond (FRA)	0	26	17	20	27	21	28	31	34	21	0	22	—	—	21	18	0	27	1	27	43	13	13	32	32	25	499
18	Nadezhda Skardino (BLR)	21	17	27	36	23	48	38	17	23	2	1	21	19	23	16	26	15	15	15	23	23	8	0	7	~~1~~	14	478
19	Selina Gasparin (SUI)	43	18	0	19	7	32	20	23	18	4	0	36	29	25	0	1	21	—	23	9	25	26	0	10	13	38	439
20	Valj Semerenko (UKR)	9	13	9	2	—	—	—	—	27	48	34	25	13	11	19	0	48	0	13	34	30	29	20	19	5	30	438
21	Karin Oberhofer (ITA)	11	0	1	11	14	17	23	18	30	28	25	—	34	24	12	15	12	21	29	17	36	2	19	0	12	22	432
22	Ekaterina Glazyrina (RUS)	48	15	32	0	19	31	17	26	4	17	0	14	—	—	14	40	36	20	—	—	—	—	0	14	21	34	402
23	Jana Gereková (SVK)	1	38	31	15	6	30	18	14	0	—	38	20	17	21	30	23	0	31	3	—	17	0	14	0	0	23	390
24	Synnøve Solemdal (NOR)	0	20	29	43	60	0	16	12	1	18	28	23	11	32	22	22	0	25	11	—	11	—	—	—	—	—	384
25	Nadine Horchler (GER)	0	19	10	28	31	3	13	—	32	20	6	—	40	40	0	—	13	—	10	10	20	19	0	21	4	15	354
26	Weronika Nowakowska-Ziemniak (POL)	25	16	25	22	21	4	0	13	0	—	36	15	18	16	7	14	18	29	30	0	—	—	0	2	0	20	331
27	Franziska Hildebrand (GER)	27	0	0	—	—	28	0	—	0	12	20	—	2	22	28	24	0	19	14	26	15	11	—	27	27	16	318
28	Marie Laure Brunet (FRA)	28	34	38	1	18	0	—	—	29	38	0	18	23	—	15	30	22	13	—	—	—	—	—	—	—	—	307
29	Tiril Eckhoff (NOR)	0	0	0	0	0	23	19	22	0	—	17	—	0	12	—	—	—	—	26	38	21	0	30	31	29	31	299
30	Juliya Dzhyma (UKR)	3	28	11	26	—	8	11	—	38	11	13	—	6	—	—	—	28	—	—	—	—	14	22	26	18	26	289
#	Name	ÖST IN	ÖST SP	ÖST PU	HOC SP	HOC PU	POK SP	POK PU	POK MS	OBE SP	OBE PU	RUH SP	RUH MS	ANT SP	ANT PU	WCH SP	WCH PU	WCH IN	WCH MS	HOL SP	HOL PU	HOL MS	SOC IN	SOC SP	KHM SP	KHM PU	KHM MS	Total
31	Ekaterina Shumilova (RUS)	0	—	—	25	34	26	26	29	17	30	16	17	—	—	26	12	—	12	—	—	—	0	—	6	2	—	278
32	Ekaterina Yurlova (RUS)	38	23	22	23	15	16	25	40	0	9	—	13	0	0	—	—	9	—	—	—	—	24	0	0	9	—	266
33	Fanny Welle-Strand Horn (NOR)	0	30	12	6	5	0	1	—	24	15	32	30	24	—	6	4	0	—	12	16	18	—	—	—	—	—	235
34	Sophie Boilley (FRA)	0	0	0	0	0	10	21	24	0	0	19	—	20	36	25	13	0	—	3	11	26	25	0	1	0	—	234
35	Laura Dahlmeier (GER)	—	—	—	—	—	—	—	—	—	—	—	—	—	—	—	—	—	—	36	31	14	—	36	29	38	36	220
36	Ann Kristin Flatland (NOR)	—	—	—	—	—	—	—	—	—	—	12	—	23	38	34	36	0	17	5	—	—	17	0	—	—	—	186
37	Monika Hojnisz (POL)	0	0	—	—	—	0	9	—	22	13	0	—	5	0	17	28	—	48	—	—	—	—	29	8	—	—	179
38	Dorothea Wierer (ITA)	0	0	—	3	11	—	—	—	19	23	0	—	12	20	20	11	0	—	0	—	—	21	0	9	22	—	171
39	Michela Ponza (ITA)	0	12	21	0	10	0	0	—	—	—	—	—	3	13	—	—	0	—	19	30	16	23	3	0	10	—	160
40	Susan Dunklee (USA)	0	0	2	10	0	27	3	—	—	—	0	—	0	0	0	0	26	—	0	—	—	36	16	12	0	—	132
41	Andreja Mali (SLO)	0	0	—	0	0	0	0	—	9	8	26	12	7	6	0	—	5	—	18	14	—	20	1	0	—	—	126
42	Iris Schwabl (AUT)	—	—	—	0	0	9	0	—	15	6	11	—	0	14	11	8	17	—	0	—	—	22	11	0	—	—	124
43	Éva Tófalvi (ROU)	12	0	6	0	3	0	—	—	—	—	0	—	0	—	10	7	0	—	22	19	—	9	17	16	0	—	121
44	Rosanna Crawford (CAN)	0	0	0	17	16	29	14	19	—	—	0	—	0	—	0	—	24	—	0	—	—	0	0	—	—	—	119
45	Annelies Cook (USA)	0	0	—	0	—	1	8	—	0	—	15	—	23	4	0	0	3	—	0	3	—	27	23	5	6	—	118
46	Evi Sachenbacher-Stehle (GER)	—	—	—	—	—	0	0	—	—	—	—	—	0	—	—	—	—	—	9	12	—	12	38	15	23	—	109
47	Mariya Panfilova (UKR)	—	—	—	—	—	—	—	—	—	—	—	—	—	—	—	—	—	—	24	18	13	28	16	—	—	—	99
48	Zina Kocher (CAN)	18	31	4	0	—	25	0	—	0	7	0	—	0	0	0	—	0	—	0	13	—	0	0	—	—	—	98
49	Natalya Burdyga (UKR)	0	0	—	7	0	0	—	—	11	19	0	—	0	0	—	—	—	—	31	15	12	—	—	—	—	—	95
50	Marine Bolliet (FRA)	14	0	0	0	—	0	0	—	0	24	0	—	15	8	—	—	—	—	0	5	—	0	21	0	8	—	95
51	Zhang Yan (CHN)	—	—	—	0	0	0	0	—	0	25	0	—	0	0	9	17	25	16	—	—	—	—	—	—	—	—	92
52	Marina Korovina (RUS)	23	29	26	0	—	—	—	—	13	0	0	—	0	—	—	—	—	—	0	—	—	—	—	—	—	—	91
53	Liudmila Kalinchik (BLR)	24	0	—	0	—	0	4	—	14	0	2	—	9	—	0	5	10	—	8	8	—	3	0	0	0	—	87
54	Nicole Gontier (ITA)	0	0	0	0	0	11	2	—	16	0	0	—	14	17	0	0	—	—	0	0	—	0	10	3	14	—	84
55	Nastassia Dubarezava (BLR)	0	4	15	5	4	0	—	—	26	3	0	—	0	—	13	0	0	—	0	—	—	0	9	0	0	—	79
56	Elisa Gasparin (SUI)	0	0	0	0	—	0	—	—	—	—	0	—	25	10	5	6	7	—	0	21	—	0	0	0	0	—	74
57	Mari Laukkanen (FIN)	0	0	0	13	0	0	0	—	0	—	31	16	10	0	0	0	0	—	0	0	—	0	0	0	0	—	70
58	Darya Usanova (KAZ)	0	0	—	0	—	—	—	—	2	5	0	—	8	0	0	0	0	—	—	—	—	0	0	24	19	11	69
59	Ekaterina Iourieva (RUS)	—	—	—	—	—	—	—	—	—	—	—	—	0	—	—	—	—	—	6	28	—	0	27	0	7	—	68
60	Diana Rasimovičiūtė (LTU)	17	0	8	0	1	0	—	—	—	—	0	—	0	—	1	3	0	—	0	—	—	0	0	13	11	—	54
#	Name	ÖST IN	ÖST SP	ÖST PU	HOC SP	HOC PU	POK SP	POK PU	POK MS	OBE SP	OBE PU	RUH SP	RUH MS	ANT SP	ANT PU	WCH SP	WCH PU	WCH IN	WCH MS	HOL SP	HOL PU	HOL MS	SOC IN	SOC SP	KHM SP	KHM PU	KHM MS	Total
61	Elin Mattsson (SWE)	6	0	0	9	0	0	—	—	0	0	18	—	0	0	18	0	0	—	—	—	—	0	0	0	0	—	51
62	Hilde Fenne (NOR)	—	11	13	0	—	—	—	—	0	10	0	—	—	—	—	—	0	—	—	—	—	16	0	0	—	—	50
63	Nadzeya Pisarava (BLR)	0	0	—	0	0	20	7	—	—	—	—	—	—	—	—	—	—	—	21	0	—	0	—	0	—	—	48
64	Emilia Yordanova (BUL)	0	0	—	0	—	0	—	—	0	—	0	—	0	—	0	—	0	—	7	22	—	0	18	0	—	—	47
65	Agnieszka Cyl (POL)	—	—	—	0	2	22	12	11	—	—	—	—	—	—	—	—	0	—	—	—	—	—	—	—	—	—	47
66	Sara Studebaker (USA)	0	0	—	0	0	5	6	—	12	—	8	—	0	2	0	—	14	—	0	—	—	0	0	0	—	—	47
67	Anna Karin Strömstedt (SWE)	0	1	5	29	8	0	0	—	—	—	—	—	0	0	—	—	—	—	—	—	—	—	0	0	0	—	43
68	Elisabeth Högberg (SWE)	0	—	—	0	—	0	5	—	0	—	9	—	0	—	0	0	20	—	—	—	—	0	8	0	—	—	42
69	Alexia Runggaldier (ITA)	0	0	0	8	13	—	—	—	0	0	0	—	1	1	4	2	0	—	0	—	—	4	6	0	—	—	39
70	Paulina Bobak (POL)	0	0	0	18	17	—	—	—	0	0	—	—	—	—	—	—	—	—	0	2	—	—	—	—	—	—	37
71	Romana Schrempf (AUT)	0	0	—	0	—	6	0	—	3	0	4	—	0	0	0	0	0	—	—	—	—	7	0	17	0	—	37
72	Tina Bachmann (GER)	4	8	3	0	0	0	15	—	0	—	3	—	—	—	—	—	—	—	—	—	—	—	—	—	—	—	33
73	Fuyuko Suzuki (JPN)	0	0	0	12	9	0	—	—	5	1	0	—	0	—	0	0	0	—	0	4	—	0	—	—	—	—	31
74	Olga Podchufarova (RUS)	—	—	—	—	—	—	—	—	—	—	—	—	—	—	—	—	—	—	—	—	—	—	0	11	16	—	27
75	Irina Starykh (RUS)	—	—	—	—	—	—	—	—	—	—	—	—	—	—	—	—	—	—	4	20	—	—	—	—	—	—	24
76	Tang Jialin (CHN)	0	0	—	0	—	0	—	—	0	0	0	—	—	—	3	10	11	—	—	—	—	—	—	—	—	—	24
77	Kadri Lehtla (EST)	19	2	0	0	—	0	—	—	—	—	0	—	0	—	0	—	0	—	—	—	—	—	—	—	—	—	21
78	Svetlana Sleptsova (RUS)	—	0	—	—	—	0	—	—	—	—	—	—	—	—	—	—	—	—	—	—	—	18	0	—	—	—	18
79	Barbora Tomešová (CZE)	0	0	—	0	—	—	—	—	—	—	—	—	—	—	0	—	1	—	16	0	—	—	—	—	—	—	17
80	Ane Skorve Nossum (NOR)	—	—	—	—	—	—	—	—	—	—	—	—	—	—	—	—	—	—	—	—	—	5	7	0	3	—	15
81	Marte Olsbu (NOR)	13	—	—	—	—	—	—	—	—	—	—	—	—	—	—	—	—	—	—	—	—	—	—	—	—	—	13
82	Iana Bondar (UKR)	—	—	—	—	—	—	—	—	—	—	—	—	4	9	0	—	—	—	—	—	—	—	0	—	—	—	13
83	Megan Heinicke (CAN)	—	—	—	0	12	0	0	—	0	0	0	—	0	—	0	0	0	—	0	0	—	—	0	—	—	—	12
84	Reka Ferencz (ROU)	5	0	7	0	—	0	—	—	—	—	0	—	0	—	0	0	0	—	0	—	—	0	0	0	—	—	12
85	Maren Hammerschmidt (GER)	0	5	0	—	—	—	—	—	—	—	—	—	0	7	—	—	—	—	—	—	—	—	—	—	—	—	12
86	Laure Soulie (AND)	0	0	0	0	—	0	—	—	—	—	0	—	0	5	0	—	2	—	0	0	—	0	5	0	0	—	12
87	Yuki Nakajima (JPN)	0	10	0	0	—	0	—	—	0	0	0	—	0	—	0	—	0	—	0	—	—	0	0	—	—	—	10
88	Elise Ringen (NOR)	0	9	0	—	—	0	—	—	—	—	—	—	—	—	—	—	—	—	—	—	—	—	—	—	—	—	9
89	Anastasia Zagoruiko (RUS)	—	—	—	—	—	—	—	—	—	—	5	—	0	3	—	—	—	—	—	—	—	0	0	—	—	—	8
90	Iryna Kryuko (BLR)	0	0	—	0	0	0	0	—	7	0	0	—	—	—	—	—	—	—	0	—	—	0	0	0	—	—	7
#	Name	ÖST IN	ÖST SP	ÖST PU	HOC SP	HOC PU	POK SP	POK PU	POK MS	OBE SP	OBE PU	RUH SP	RUH MS	ANT SP	ANT PU	WCH SP	WCH PU	WCH IN	WCH MS	HOL SP	HOL PU	HOL MS	SOC IN	SOC SP	KHM SP	KHM PU	KHM MS	Total
91	Bente Landheim (NOR)	—	—	—	0	—	7	0	—	0	—	—	—	0	—	—	—	—	—	—	—	—	0	0	0	0	—	7
92	Veronika Zvařičová (CZE)	0	7	0	0	—	0	—	—	0	—	0	—	0	—	—	—	—	—	—	—	—	—	—	—	—	—	7
93	Valentina Nazarova (RUS)	—	—	—	—	—	—	—	—	—	—	—	—	—	—	—	—	—	—	0	7	—	—	—	—	—	—	7
94	Emelie Larsson (SWE)	7	0	—	—	—	—	—	—	0	—	0	—	0	—	—	—	—	—	0	—	—	—	—	—	—	—	7
95	Natalija Kocergina (LTU)	0	0	—	0	—	0	—	—	6	0	0	—	—	—	0	—	0	—	0	—	—	0	0	0	—	—	6
96	Martina Chrapanova (SVK)	2	0	—	4	0	0	—	—	0	—	0	—	0	—	0	—	0	—	—	—	—	0	0	—	—	—	6
97	Jitka Landová (CZE)	—	—	—	—	—	0	—	—	—	—	0	—	0	—	0	0	0	—	—	—	—	0	4	0	0	—	4
98	Niya Dimitrova (BUL)	—	—	—	0	—	0	—	—	0	—	0	—	0	—	0	—	4	—	0	—	—	0	—	0	—	—	4
99	Luminita Piscoran (ROU)	0	0	—	0	—	2	0	—	0	—	0	—	0	—	0	—	0	—	0	—	—	0	0	0	—	—	2
100	Aleksandra Alikina (RUS)	—	—	—	—	—	—	—	—	—	—	—	—	—	—	—	—	—	—	0	1	—	—	—	—	—	—	1
101	Victoria Padial (ESP)	0	0	—	0	—	0	—	—	0	0	0	—	0	—	0	0	0	—	0	0	—	1	0	0	0	—	1
