= 2012–13 Biathlon World Cup – Sprint Women =

The 2012–13 Biathlon World Cup – Sprint Women will start at Saturday December 1, 2012 in Östersund and will finish Thursday March 14, 2013 in Khanty-Mansiysk. Defending titlist is Magdalena Neuner of Germany.

== Competition format ==
The 7.5 kilometres sprint race is the third oldest biathlon event; the distance is skied over three laps. The biathlete shoots two times at any shooting lane, first prone, then standing, totalling 10 targets. For each missed target the biathlete has to complete a penalty lap of around 150 metres. Competitors' starts are staggered, normally by 30 seconds.

== 2010-11 Top 3 standings ==
Medal	Athlete	Points
Gold:	(Germany) Magdalena Neuner	571
Silver:	(Belarus) Darya Domracheva	471
Bronze:	(Finland) Kaisa Mäkäräinen	401

== Medal winners ==
Event:	Gold:	Time	Silver:	Time	Bronze:	Time
Östersund details	Tora Berger; Norway	21:34.0 (0+1)	Olena Pidhrushna; Ukraine	21:50.9 (0+1)	Olga Vilukhina; Russia	21:53.4 (0+1)
Hochfilzen details	Darya Domracheva; Belarus	22:24.7 (1+0)	Kaisa Mäkäräinen; Finland	22:29.4 (0+1)	Tora Berger; Norway	22:37.6 (0+1)
Pokljuka details	Gabriela Soukalová; Czech Republic	22:09.8 (0+0)	Miriam Gössner; Germany	22:11.9 (0+2)	Nadezhda Skardino; Belarus	22:39.9 (0+0)
Oberhof details	Miriam Gössner; Germany	21:17.2 (0+2)	Tora Berger; Norway	21:19.2 (0+0)	Andrea Henkel; Germany	21:41.3 (0+0)
Ruhpolding details	Miriam Gössner; Germany	20:57.2 (0+1)	Darya Domracheva; Belarus	21:04.3 (0+1)	Kaisa Mäkäräinen; Finland	21:14.7 (1+0)
Antholz details	Anastasiya Kuzmina; Slovakia	20:28.6 (0+0)	Kaisa Mäkäräinen; Finland	20:45.3 (1+0)	Darya Domracheva; Belarus	20:50.5 (1+0)
Biathlon World Championships 2013 details	Olena Pidhrushna; Ukraine	21:02.1 (0+1)	Tora Berger; Norway	21:08.5 (0+1)	Vita Semerenko; Ukraine	21:24.9 (0+0)
Holmenkollen details	Tora Berger; Norway	21:31.2 (0+0)	Darya Domracheva; Belarus	21:43.2 (1+1)	Anastasiya Kuzmina; Slovakia	22:02.1 (1+1)
Sochi details	Magdalena Gwizdoń; Poland	25:28.7 (0+0)	Anastasiya Kuzmina; Slovakia	25:38.9 (1+0)	Tora Berger; Norway	25:42.4 (0+1)
Khanty-Mansiysk details	Gabriela Soukalová; Czech Republic	21:25.6 (0+0)	Andrea Henkel; Germany	21:42.8 (0+0)	Miriam Gössner; Germany	21:49.2 (0+1)

== Standings ==
#	Name	ÖST	HOC	POK	OBE	RUH	ANT	WCH	HOL	SOC	KHA	Total
1	Tora Berger (NOR)	60	48	14	54	29	27	54	60	48	34	428
2	Darya Domracheva (BLR)	36	60	—	31	54	48	0	54	40	28	351
3	Miriam Gössner (GER)	0	32	54	60	60	0	38	17	28	48	337
4	Marie Dorin Habert (FRA)	3	31	40	43	40	36	23	43	43	23	325
5	Kaisa Mäkäräinen (FIN)	6	54	19	21	48	54	32	20	32	38	324
6	Gabriela Soukalová (CZE)	27	27	60	—	30	31	27	27	24	60	313
7	Andrea Henkel (GER)	40	24	36	48	43	16	8	38	0	54	307
8	Olena Pidhrushna (UKR)	54	21	15	20	22	43	60	40	0	30	305
9	Anastasiya Kuzmina (SVK)	22	14	24	8	0	60	24	48	54	40	294
10	Vita Semerenko (UKR)	14	30	43	28	23	—	48	34	25	36	281
11	Magdalena Gwizdoń (POL)	21	38	38	0	14	26	29	28	60	25	279
12	Olga Vilukhina (RUS)	48	16	18	36	7	38	40	—	26	43	272
13	Olga Zaitseva (RUS)	43	0	0	40	24	32	43	—	31	22	235
14	Krystyna Pałka (POL)	25	40	12	10	28	28	36	25	2	18	224
15	Teja Gregorin (SLO)	24	36	13	0	10	30	2	32	34	20	201
16	Jana Gereková (SVK)	38	15	30	0	38	17	30	3	14	0	185
17	Nadezhda Skardino (BLR)	15	38	48	23	1	19	16	15	0	7	182
18	Karin Oberhofer (ITA)	0	11	17	30	25	34	12	29	19	0	177
19	Anais Bescond (FRA)	26	20	21	34	0	—	21	1	13	32	168
20	Juliya Dzhyma (UKR)	28	26	8	38	13	6	—	—	22	26	167
21	Valj Semerenko (UKR)	13	2	—	27	34	13	19	13	20	19	160
22	Nadine Horchler (GER)	19	28	3	32	6	40	0	10	0	21	159
23	Veronika Vítková (CZE)	32	0	34	25	21	0	31	0	12	4	159
24	Selina Gasparin (SUI)	18	19	32	18	0	29	0	23	0	10	149
25	Synnøve Solemdal (NOR)	20	43	0	1	28	11	22	11	—	—	136
26	Weronika Nowakowska-Ziemniak (POL)	16	22	4	0	36	18	7	30	0	2	135
27	Fanny Welle-Strand Horn (NOR)	30	6	0	24	32	24	6	12	—	—	134
28	Tiril Eckhoff (NOR)	0	0	23	0	17	0	—	26	30	31	127
29	Franziska Hildebrand (GER)	0	—	28	0	20	2	28	14	—	27	119
30	Ekaterina Shumilova (RUS)	–	25	26	17	16	—	26	—	—	6	116
31	Marie Laure Brunet (FRA)	34	1	0	29	0	23	15	—	—	—	102
32	Laura Dahlmeier (GER)	—	—	—	—	—	—	—	36	36	29	101
33	Monika Hojnisz (POL)	0	—	0	22	0	5	17	—	29	8	81
34	Ekaterina Glazyrina (RUS)	15	0	31	4	0	—	14	—	0	14	78
35	Sophie Boilley (FRA)	0	0	10	0	19	20	25	3	0	1	78
36	Ann Kristin Flatland (NOR)	—	—	—	—	12	23	34	5	0	—	74
37	Annelies Cook (USA)	0	0	1	0	15	23	0	0	23	5	67
38	Susan Dunklee (USA)	0	10	27	—	0	0	0	0	16	12	65
39	Éva Tófalvi (ROU)	0	0	0	—	0	0	10	22	17	16	65
40	Dorothea Wierer (ITA)	0	3	—	19	0	12	20	0	0	9	63
41	Evi Sachenbacher-Stehle (GER)	—	—	0	—	—	0	—	9	38	15	62
42	Ekaterina Yurlova (RUS)	23	23	16	0	—	0	—	—	0	0	62
43	Andreja Mali (SLO)	0	0	0	9	26	7	0	18	1	0	61
44	Nastassia Dubarezava (BLR)	4	5	0	26	0	0	13	0	9	0	57
45	Iris Schwabl (AUT)	—	0	9	15	11	0	11	0	11	0	57
46	Zina Kocher (CAN)	31	0	25	0	0	0	0	0	0	—	56
47	Mari Laukkanen (FIN)	0	13	0	0	31	10	0	0	0	0	54
48	Nicole Gontier (ITA)	0	0	11	16	0	14	0	0	10	3	54
49	Natalya Burdyga (UKR)	0	7	0	11	0	0	—	31	—	—	49
50	Rosanna Crawford (CAN)	0	17	29	—	0	0	0	0	0	—	46
51	Elin Mattsson (SWE)	0	9	0	0	18	0	18	—	0	0	45
52	Marina Korovina (RUS)	29	0	—	13	0	0	—	0	—	—	42
53	Nadzeya Pisarava (BLR)	0	0	20	—	—	—	—	21	—	0	41
54	Mariya Panfilova (UKR)	—	—	—	—	—	—	—	24	16	—	40
55	Michela Ponza (ITA)	12	0	0	—	—	3	—	19	3	0	37
56	Marine Bolliet (FRA)	0	0	0	0	0	15	—	0	21	0	36
57	Darya Usanova (KAZ)	0	0	—	2	0	8	0	—	0	24	34
58	Ekaterina Iourieva (RUS)	—	—	—	—	—	0	—	6	27	0	33
59	Liudmila Kalinchik (BLR)	0	0	0	14	2	9	0	8	0	0	33
60	Anna Karin Strömstedt (SWE)	1	29	—	—	—	0	—	—	0	0	30
61	Elisa Gasparin (SUI)	0	0	0	—	0	25	5	0	0	0	30
62	Romana Schrempf (AUT)	0	0	6	3	4	0	0	—	0	17	30
63	Emilia Yordanova (BUL)	0	0	0	0	0	0	0	7	18	0	25
64	Sara Studebaker (USA)	0	0	5	12	8	0	0	0	0	0	25
65	Agnieszka Cyl (POL)	—	0	22	—	—	—	—	—	—	—	22
66	Alexia Runggaldier (ITA)	0	8	—	0	0	1	4	0	6	0	19
67	Paulina Bobak (POL)	0	18	—	0	—	—	—	0	—	—	18
68	Fuyuko Suzuki (JPN)	0	12	0	5	0	0	0	0	—	—	17
69	Elisabeth Högberg (SWE)	—	0	0	0	9	0	0	—	8	0	17
70	Barbora Tomešová (CZE)	0	0	—	—	—	—	0	16	—	—	16
71	Diana Rasimovičiūtė (LTU)	0	0	0	—	0	0	1	0	0	13	14
72	Hilde Fenne (NOR)	11	0	—	0	0	—	—	—	0	0	11
73	Olga Podchufarova (NOR)	—	—	—	—	—	—	—	—	0	11	11
74	Tina Bachmann (GER)	8	0	0	0	3	—	—	—	—	—	11
75	Yuki Nakajima (JPN)	10	0	0	0	0	0	0	0	0	—	10
76	Zhang Yan (CHN)	0	0	0	0	0	0	9	—	—	—	9
77	Elise Ringen (NOR)	9	–	0	—	—	—	—	—	—	—	9
78	Ane Skrove Nossum (NOR)	—	—	—	—	—	—	—	—	7	0	7
79	Iryna Kryuko (BLR)	0	0	0	7	0	—	—	0	0	0	7
80	Veronika Zvaricova (CZE)	7	0	0	0	0	0	—	—	—	—	7
81	Bente Landheim (NOR)	—	0	7	0	—	0	—	—	0	0	7
82	Natalija Kocergina (LTU)	0	0	0	6	0	—	0	0	0	0	6
83	Laure Soulie (AND)	0	0	0	—	0	0	0	0	5	0	5
84	Anastasia Zagoruiko (RUS)	—	—	—	—	5	0	—	—	0	—	5
85	Maren Hammerschmidt (GER)	5	—	—	—	—	0	—	—	—	—	5
86	Jitka Landová (CZE)	—	—	0	—	0	0	0	—	4	0	4
87	Iana Bondar (UKR)	—	—	—	—	—	4	0	—	0	—	4
88	Martina Chrapanova (SVK)	0	4	0	0	0	0	0	—	0	—	4
89	Irina Starykh (RUS)	—	—	—	—	—	—	—	4	—	—	4
90	Tang Jialin (CHN)	0	0	0	0	0	—	3	—	—	—	3
91	Kadri Lehtla (EST)	2	0	0	—	0	0	0	—	—	—	2
92	Luminita Piscoran (ROM)	0	0	2	0	0	0	0	0	0	0	2
