= Biathlon European Championships 2012 – Women's pursuit =

The women's pursuit competition of the Biathlon European Championships 2012 was held on January 29, 2012 at 13:00 local time.

== Results ==
Place	Name	Penalties	Time
1	(Ukraine) Olena Pidhrushna	0+0+0+2	31:28,07
2	(Ukraine) Valj Semerenko	0+1+0+2	+12,4
3	(Russia) Anastasia Zagoruiko	0+0+0+0	+12.9
4	(Russia) Ekaterina Shumilova	0+1+0+1	+13.4
5	(Germany) Nadine Horchler	0+0+0+0	+35.2
6	(Poland) Weronika Nowakowska-Ziemniak	0+1+0+1	+45.0
7	(Kazakhstan) Darya Usanova	2+0+0+0	+48.5
8	(Germany) Juliane Döll	1+0+0+1	+1:18.2
9	(Czech Republic) Barbora Tomešová	0+0+0+3	+2:30.8
10	(Germany) Maren Hammerschmidt	0+1+1+2	+2:39.8
11	(Germany) Carolin Hennecke	0+1+1+1	+2:46.1
12	(Russia) Aleksandra Alikina	1+2+0+1	+2:48.8
13	(Slovakia) Martina Chrapánová	0+0+0+0	+2:51.3
14	(Italy) Federica Sanfilippo	2+0+2+0	+3:00.4
15	(Canada) Megan Heinicke	0+0+1+1	+3:05.4
16	(Norway) Marie Hov	1+1+0+0	+3:05.4
17	(Germany) Karolin Horchler	0+0+0+0	+3:07.4
18	(Ukraine) Juliya Dzhyma	1+0+1+1	+3.08.8
19	(Bulgaria) Emilia Jordanowa	0+2+0+0	+3:25.2
20	(Poland) Karolina Pitoń	1+1+0+1	+3:46.3
21	(Norway) Ane Skrove Nossum	1+1+1+3	+3:56.5
22	(Czech Republic) Veronika Zvařičová	0+2+0+1	+4:01.4
23	(Czech Republic) Gabriela Soukalová	0+1+0+4	+4:04.0
24	(Belarus) Darja Jurkewitsch	0+0+1+1	+4:05.1
25	(Russia) Evgenia Sedowa	1+2+0+1	+4:28.6
26	(Austria) Romana Schrempf	2+1+2+3	+5:18.1
27	(Belarus) Ala Talkatsch	0+2+2+1	+5:37.7
28	(United States) Laura Spector	1+0+2+2	+6:00.9
29	(Slovenia) Lili Drčar	0+1+3+2	+6:51.3
30	(Norway) Ane Sandaker Kvittingen	2+1+1+5	+6:57.2
31	(Poland) Katarzyna Leja	0+0+1+2	+6:59.3
32	(South Korea) Kim Kyung-nam	0+1+1+2	+7:01.1
33	(United States) Hanah Dreissigacker	4+0+2+1	+7:06.9
34	(Spain) Victoria Padial Hernández	0+1+2+2	+7:15.9
35	(Slovakia) Terézia Poliaková	1+1+2+2	+7:16.0
36	(Ukraine) Tetiana Trachuk	0+3+3+1	+7:21.9
37	(Slovakia) Lucia Simová	1+0+2+1	+7:23.0
38	(Slovakia) Natália Prekopová	0+0+2+1	+8:58.8
39	(Lithuania) Aliona Sabaliauskienė	1+0+2+2	+8:59.8
40	(Finland) Laura Toivanen	0+0+1+3	+9:15.2
LAP	(Latvia) Žanna Juškāne	2+2	LAP
LAP	(Romania) Réka Ferencz	1+1+3	LAP
LAP	(Czech Republic) Lea Johanidesová	1+1	LAP
LAP	(Belarus) Anastasiya Kalei	0+0	LAP
LAP	(Poland) Beata Szymańczak	2+4	LAP
LAP	(Belarus) Maryia Kolesen	1+1	LAP
LAP	(Moldova) Alexandra Camenscic	1+1	LAP
DNS	(Estonia) Grete Gaim
DNS	(Bulgaria) Dafinka Koeva
DNS	(Estonia) Daria Yurlova
DNS	(Hungary) Anett Bozsik
DNS	(Serbia) Jelena Novoselac
