= Biathlon European Championships 2012 – Women's 4 x 6 km Relay =

The women's relay competition of the Biathlon European Championships 2012 was held on February 2, 2012 at 10:00 local time.

== Results ==
| Place | Country | Team | Penalties | Time |
|---|---|---|---|---|
| 1 | Ukraine | Juliya Dzhyma; Valj Semerenko; Vita Semerenko; Olena Pidhrushna | 0+0 0+1; 0+2 0+1; 0+0 0+0; 0+2 0+1 | 1:15:14.3 |
| 2 | Russia | Anastasia Zagoruiko; Aleksandra Alikina; Evgenia Seledtsova; Ekaterina Shumilova | 0+0 0+0; 0+3 0+2; 0+0 0+1; 0+0 0+1 | +1:18.1 |
| 3 | Germany | Maren Hammerschmidt; Nadine Horchler; Carolin Hennecke; Juliane Döll | 0+0 0+2; 0+1 0+2; 0+0 0+3; 0+0 0+1 | +1:52.7 |
| 4 | Czech Republic | Veronika Zvařičová; Gabriela Soukalová; Barbora Tomešová; Lea Johanidesová | 0+1 0+0; 1+3 0+1; 0+0 0+0; 0+3 0+3 | +6:18.1 |
| 5 | Belarus | Darja Jurkewitsch; Ala Talkatsch; Darja Nestertschik; Maryia Chelachova | 0+0 0+1; 0+0 0+2; 0+0 0+1; 0+1 0+2 | +6:57.8 |
| 6 | Poland | Karolina Pitoń; Monika Hojnisz; Beata Szymańczak; Katarzyna Leja | 0+0 0+1; 0+2 0+0; 0+0 0+1; 0+2 0+2 | +7:37.9 |
| 7 | Slovakia | Martina Chrapánová; Terézia Poliaková; Natália Prekopová; Lucia Simová | 0+1 2+3; 0+0 0+1; 0+1 0+1; 0+0 0+2 | LAP |
