= Biathlon European Championships 2011 – Women's individual =

The women's sprint competition of the Biathlon European Championships 2011 was held on February 22, 2011 at 10:00 local time.

Place	Name	Penalties	Time
1	(Germany) Juliane Döll	0+0+1+0	50:45,1
2	(Ukraine) Olena Pidhrushna	0+0+0+0	+16,7
3	(Russia) Ekaterina Glazyrina	1+0+0+0	+1:06,4
4	(Russia) Ekaterina Yurlova	0+2+0+0	+1:11.5
5	(Germany) Nadine Horchler	0+0+1+0	+2:23.4
6	(France) Marine Bolliet	1+1+0+1	+2:42.3
7	(Germany) Franziska Hildebrand	0+0+0+2	+4:07.9
8	(Czech Republic) Gabriela Soukalová	1+1+0+1	+4:18.8
9	(Germany) Susann König	0+2+0+0	+4:47.0
10	(Italy) Karin Oberhofer	0+3+1+0	+5:16.3
11	(France) Jacquemine Baud	0+0+0+2	+5:38.2
12	(Estonia) Kadri Lehtla	1+1+2+1	+5:43.8
13	(Belarus) Darja Jurkewitsch	0+2+0+1	+6:09.2
14	(Russia) Anna Kunayeva	2+2+1+0	+6:36.2
15	(United States) Susan Dunklee	3+2+0+0	+6:42.0
16	(Canada) Melanie Schultz	1+1+0+0	+6:54.4
17	(Poland) Karolina Pitoń	0+1+0+2	+7:17.3
18	(Poland) Beata Szymańczak	0+1+2+2	+7:24.3
19	(Belarus) Iryna Babezkaja	1+2+1+2	+7:31.4
20	(Belarus) Ala Talkatsch	1+2+0+1	+7:35.9
21	(Belarus) Nastassja Dubaresawa	0+4+1+1	+7:58.9
22	(Finland) Sarianna Repo	0+1+0+1	+8:05.7
23	(France) Claire Breton	1+2+1+1	+8:06.0
24	(Canada) Rosanna Crawford	0+0+0+3	+8:06.8
25	(France) Marine Dusser	1+0+1+3	+8:11.7
26	(Slovakia) Martina Chrapánová	0+1+0+1	+8:12.9
27	(Austria) Iris Waldhuber	2+0+0+1	+8:16.4
28	(Italy) Roberta Fiandino	2+2+2+1	+8:22.6
29	(Norway) Birgitte Røksund	0+1+1+1	+8:37.2
30	(Ukraine) Juliya Dzhyma	0+2+2+2	+8:48.9
31	(Russia) Irina Trusowa	1+2+2+1	+9:22.2
32	(Canada) Claude Godbout	0+1+0+2	+9:57.0
33	(Italy) Michela Andreola	2+2+1+2	+10:09.1
34	(United Kingdom) Amanda Lightfoot	1+2+1+2	+10:21.5
35	(Finland) Laura Toivanen	1+0+1+3	+10:57.8
36	(Czech Republic) Veronika Zvařičová	0+3+0+1	+11:05.0
37	(Ukraine) Kateryna Tseselska	3+2+1+2	+11:09.7
38	(Poland) Patrycja Hojnisz	1+2+1+0	+11:41.2
39	(Austria) Ramona Düringer	3+1+3+2	+11:45.7
40	(Spain) Victoria Padial Hernández	1+2+2+0	+13:03.6
41	(Ukraine) Nataliya Tikhonova	0+1+1+1	+13:14.2
42	(New Zealand) Sarah Murphy	0+1+0+5	+13:23.2
43	(Austria) Kerstin Muschet	2+2+1+3	+14:03.1
44	(Latvia) Žanna Juškāne	2+2+1+2	+14:09.4
45	(Lithuania) Natalija Kočergina	1+5+3+1	+15:35.8
dnf	(Slovakia) Natália Prekopová	1+3+
dnf	(Lithuania) Aliona Sosunova	1+3+1+2
dnf	(Bulgaria) Emilia Jordanowa	2+
dns	(Czech Republic) Barbora Tomešová
dns	(Czech Republic) Lea Johanidesová
