= Yolaine =

Yolaine is a French feminine given name. Notable people with the name include:

- Yolaine de Courson (born 1954), French politician
- Yolaine Oddou (born 1990), French-Canadian biathlete
- Dascha Yolaine Polanco (born 1982), Dominican actress
- Yolaine Yengo (born 1993), French rugby sevens player
