= Biathlon European Championships 2012 =

International biathlon competition

The 19th Biathlon European Championships were held in Osrblie, Slovakia from January 25 to February 2, 2012.

There were total of 15 competitions held: sprint, pursuit and individual both for U26 and U21, relay races for U26 and a mixed relay for U21.

== Schedule of events ==
Biathlon European Championships 2012 official logo

The schedule of the event stands below. All times in CET.

| Date | Time | Event |
|---|---|---|
| January 27 | 10:00 | U21 Men's 10 km sprint |
| January 27 | 13:00 | U21 Women's 7.5 km sprint |
| January 28 | 10:00 | U26 Men's 10 km sprint |
| January 28 | 13:00 | U26 Women's 7.5 km sprint |
| January 29 | 10:00 | U26 Men's 12.5 km pursuit |
| January 29 | 11:00 | U21 Men's 12.5 km pursuit |
| January 29 | 13:00 | U26 Women's 10 km pursuit |
| January 29 | 14:00 | U21 Women's 10 km pursuit |
| January 30 | 13:00 | U21 2 x 6 + 2 x 7.5 km Mixed relay |
| January 31 | 10:00 | U26 Women's 15 km individual |
| January 31 | 13:00 | U26 Men's 20 km individual |
| February 1 | 10:00 | U21 Women's 15 km individual |
| February 1 | 13:00 | U21 Men's 20 km individual |
| February 2 | 10:00 | U26 Women's 4 x 6 km relay |
| February 2 | 13:00 | U26 Men's 4 x 7.5 km relay |

== Results ==
=== U26 ===
==== Men's ====
| Competition | 1st | 2nd | 3rd |
|---|---|---|---|
| Men's 10 km sprint | (Russia) Alexey Volkov | (Ukraine) Artem Pryma | (Russia) Sergey Klyachin |
| Men's 12.5 km pursuit | (Russia) Alexey Volkov | (Ukraine) Serhiy Semenov | (Germany) Daniel Böhm |
| Men's 20 km individual | (Germany) Daniel Böhm | (Ukraine) Artem Pryma | (Germany) Erik Lesser |
| Men's 4 x 7.5 km relay | (Germany) Germany; Daniel Böhm; Matthias Bischl; Johannes Kühn; Erik Lesser | (Norway) Norway; Jan Olav Gjermundshaug; Martin Eng; Dag Erik Kokkin; Henrik L'Abée-Lund | (Russia) Russia; Nikolay Yakoshov; Sergey Klyachin; Oleksander Zhyrnyi; Alexey Volkov |

==== Women's ====
| Competition | 1st | 2nd | 3rd |
|---|---|---|---|
| Women's 7.5 km sprint | (Ukraine) Olena Pidhrushna | (Ukraine) Valentina Semerenko | (Poland) Weronika Nowakowska-Ziemniak |
| Women's 10 km pursuit | (Ukraine) Olena Pidhrushna | (Ukraine) Valentina Semerenko | (Russia) Anastasia Zagoruiko |
| Women's 15 km individual | (Russia) Anastasia Zagoruiko | (Germany) Carolin Hennecke | (Germany) Juliane Döll |
| Women's 4 x 6 km relay | (Ukraine) Ukraine; Juliya Dzhyma; Valentina Semerenko; Vita Semerenko; Olena Pidhrushna | (Russia) Russia; Anastasia Zagoruiko; Aleksandra Alikina; Evgenia Seledtsova; Ekaterina Shumilova | (Germany) Germany; Maren Hammerschmidt; Nadine Horchler; Carolin Hennecke; Juliane Döll |

=== U21 ===
==== Men's ====
| Competition | 1st | 2nd | 3rd |
|---|---|---|---|
| Men's 10 km sprint | (Norway) Vetle Sjåstad Christiansen | (Russia) Alexandr Loginov | (Russia) Maxim Tsvetkov |
| Men's 12.5 km pursuit | (Russia) Alexandr Loginov | (Norway) Vetle Sjåstad Christiansen | (Norway) Johannes Thingnes Bø |
| Men's 20 km individual | (Russia) Alexandr Loginov | (Norway) Johannes Thingnes Bø | (Norway) Vetle Sjåstad Christiansen |

==== Women's ====
| Competition | 1st | 2nd | 3rd |
|---|---|---|---|
| Women's 7.5 km sprint | (Bulgaria) Niya Dimitrova | (Ukraine) Iryna Varvynets | (Switzerland) Elisa Gasparin |
| Women's 10 km pursuit | (Ukraine) Iryna Varvynets | (Switzerland) Elisa Gasparin | (Bulgaria) Niya Dimitrova |
| Women's 15 km individual | (Norway) Marion Rønning Huber | (Russia) Olga Galich | (Italy) Nicole Gontier |

==== Mixed ====
| Competition | 1st | 2nd | 3rd |
|---|---|---|---|
| Mixed 2 x 6 + 2 x 7.5 km relay | (Norway) Norway; Thekla Brun-Lie; Marion Rønning Huber; Johannes Thingnes Bø; Vetle Sjåstad Christiansen | (Russia) Russia; Olga Galich; Elena Badanina; Maxim Tsvetkov; Alexandr Loginov | (Ukraine) Ukraine; Anastasiya Merkushyna; Iryna Varvynets; Ivan Moravskyy; Oleksandr Dakhno |

== Medal table ==
| Rank | Nation | Gold | Silver | Bronze | Total |
|---|---|---|---|---|---|
| 1 | Russia (RUS) | 5 | 4 | 3 | 12 |
| 2 | Ukraine (UKR) | 4 | 6 | 1 | 11 |
| 3 | Norway (NOR) | 3 | 3 | 2 | 8 |
| 4 | Germany (GER) | 2 | 1 | 4 | 7 |
| 5 | Bulgaria (BUL) | 1 | 0 | 1 | 2 |
| 6 | Switzerland (SUI) | 0 | 1 | 1 | 2 |
| 7 | Italy (ITA) | 0 | 0 | 1 | 1 |
| 7 | Poland (POL) | 0 | 0 | 1 | 1 |
| Totals (8 entries) | | 15 | 15 | 14 | 44 |
