= Biathlon Junior World Championships 2009 =

Biathlon event in Canada

The 2009 Biathlon Junior World Championships was held in Canmore, Canada from 25 January to 3 February 2009. There was to be a total of 16 competitions: sprint, pursuit, individual, mass start, and relay races for men and women. Events were held at Canmore Nordic Centre Provincial Park, hosting 300 athletes from 34 countries.

== Medal winners ==
=== Youth Women ===
Event:	Gold:	Time	Silver:	Time	Bronze:	Time
10 km individual details	Zhang Yan; China	35:13.7 (0+0+0+1)	Grace Boutot; United States	36:17.6 (1+0+0+0)	Yolaine Oddou; Canada	36:49.6 (1+1+0+0)
6 km sprint details	Zhang Yan; China; Olga Iakushova; Russia	19:31.4 (0+0); 19:31.4 (0+1)			Audrey Vaillancourt; Canada	19:44.6 (0+1)
7.5 km pursuit details	Dorothea Wierer; Italy	27:07.9 (1+3+0+0)	Marion Charles; France	27:36.3 (1+0+2+1)	Marie-Christin Kloß; Germany	27:38.7 (1+1+2+1)
3 × 6 km relay details	Russia; Olga Iakushova; Anna Pogorelova; Larisa Kuklina	1:00:46.4 (0+3) (0+0) (0+1) (0+3) (0+0) (0+0)	Belarus; Iryna Kryuko; Nelia Nikalayeva; Darya Nesterchik	1:01:36.8 (0+0) (0+3) (0+2) (0+3) (0+1) (0+3)	Italy; Dorothea Wierer; Nicole Gontier; Alexia Runggaldier	58:25.8 (2+3) (0+2) (1+3) (0+1) (0+1) (0+1)

=== Junior Women ===
Event:	Gold:	Time	Silver:	Time	Bronze:	Time
12.5 km individual details	Nicole Wötzel; Germany	42:15.4 (0+0+0+2)	Anastasia Zagoruiko; Russia	42:21.1 (0+1+0+0)	Elisabeth Voigt; Germany	42:39.8 (1+1+1+0)
7.5 km sprint details	Nicole Wötzel; Germany	23:28.8 (1+0)	Miriam Gössner; Germany	23:37.5 (3+2)	Sophie Boilley; France	23:38.1 (1+0)
10 km pursuit details	Miriam Gössner; Germany	33:56.9 (0+1+4+3)	Veronika Vítková; Czech Republic	34:08.0 (1+2+0+1)	Nicole Wötzel; Germany	34:15.5 (2+0+0+1)
3 × 6 km relay details	Czech Republic; Veronika Vítková; Veronika Zvařičová; Gabriela Soukalová	58:00.3 (0+0) (0+0) (0+4) (0+0) (0+1) (0+2)	Russia; Anastasia Zagoruiko; Nastassia Kalina; Olga Vilukhina	58:12.6 (0+0) (0+2) (0+1) (0+3) (0+0) (0+0)	Germany; Elisabeth Voigt; Miriam Gössner; Nicole Wötzel	58:23.0 (0+2) (0+0) (0+2) (1+3) (0+0) (0+3)

=== Youth Men ===
Event:	Gold:	Time	Silver:	Time	Bronze:	Time
12.5 km individual details	Ludwig Ehrhart; France	37:10.9 (0+0+0+1)	Antti Raatikainen; Finland	38:18.6 (0+0+0+1)	Aliaksei Abromchyk; Belarus	38:33.2 (1+1+0+0)
7.5 km sprint details	Kurtis Wenzel; Canada	21:10.2 (0+1)	Erlend Bjøntegaard; Norway	21:14.2 (0+2)	Mario Dolder; Switzerland	21:26.5 (1+1)
10 km pursuit details	Erlend Bjøntegaard; Norway	29:03.9 (0+0+1+1)	Ludwig Ehrhart; France	29:29.0 (0+0+1+0)	Kurtis Wenzel; Canada	29:32.9 (0+1+1+1)
3 × 7.5 km relay details	France; Florent Claude; Clement Jacquelin; Ludwig Ehrhart	1:06:18.8 (0+2) (0+2) (0+1) (0+1) (0+0) (0+0)	Canada; Kurtis Wenzel; Aaron Gillmor; Scott Gow	1:08:17.4 (2+3) (0+2) (0+3) (0+2) (0+1) (0+2)	Russia; Ivan Pichuzhkin; Nikolay Yakushov; Vladimir Burdinskiy	1:08:56.2 (4+3) (0+2) (0+1) (0+2) (0+0) (0+2)

=== Junior Men ===
Event:	Gold:	Time	Silver:	Time	Bronze:	Time
15 km individual details	Manuel Müller; Germany	41:18.8 (0+1+0+0)	Alexey Volkov; Russia	41:46.3 (0+0+0+2)	Erik Lesser; Germany	41:48.0 (0+0+0+2)
10 km sprint details	Lukas Hofer; Italy	27:39.3 (2+0)	Benjamin Weger; Switzerland	27:58.7 (1+0)	Tarjei Bø; Norway	28:08.2 (0+0)
12.5 km pursuit details	Lukas Hofer; Italy	34:20.3 (0+1+3+2)	Simon Schempp; Germany	34:37.3 (1+0+0+1)	Tarjei Bø; Norway	34:48.7 (3+0+0+0)
4 × 7.5 km relay details	Germany; Erik Lesser; Simon Schempp; Benedikt Doll; Florian Graf	1:23:39.8 (0+0) (0+1) (0+1) (0+3) (0+1) (0+2) (0+3) (0+2)	Russia; Evgeny Petrov; Timofey Lapshin; Pavel Magazeev; Alexey Volkov	1:26:44.7 (0+2) (0+0) (0+1) (0+2) (0+3) (1+3) (0+1) (1+3)	Belarus; Sergey Rutsevich; Vladimir Chepelin; Vitali Tsvetau; Vladimir Alenishko	1:27:00.7 (2+3) (0+1) (0+1) (0+0) (0+0) (0+1) (0+0) (0+0)

== Medal table ==
* Host nation (Canada)

Rank	Nation	Gold	Silver	Bronze	Total
1	Germany (GER)	5	2	5	12
2	Italy (ITA)	3	0	1	4
3	Russia (RUS)	2	4	1	7
4	France (FRA)	2	2	1	5
5	China (CHN)	2	0	0	2
6	Canada (CAN)*	1	1	3	5
7	Norway (NOR)	1	1	2	4
8	Czech Republic (CZE)	1	1	0	2
9	Belarus (BLR)	0	1	2	3
10	Switzerland (SUI)	0	1	1	2
11	Finland (FIN)	0	1	0	1
11	United States (USA)	0	1	0	1
Totals (12 entries)		17	15	16	48
