= Yolaine Oddou =

French-Canadian biathlete (born 1990)

Personal information
- Nationality: Canadian
- Born: 20 March 1990 (age 36)

Sport
- Country: Canada
- Sport: Biathlon
Medal record
Youth World Championships
| Bronze medal – third place | 2009 Canmore | 10 km individual |

Yolaine Oddou (born 20 March 1990 in Apprieu, France) is a French-Canadian biathlete who won Canada's woman biathlete of the year (the Myriam Bedard award) in 2009, after winning the junior championships bronze medal and placing 11th in the sprint and 6th in the pursuit for biathlon.

She has competed in the IBU Cup and the World Championships and has been part of Canada's National Development Team for biathlon.

Oddou, who moved to Canada with her family from France in 1999, first tried biathlon while skiing at the Castor Kanik club in Valcatier.

She studied sports at Cégep Garneau. She lives in Haute-Saint-Charles, Quebec.
