= Susanne Hoffmann =

Austrian biathlete (born 1994)

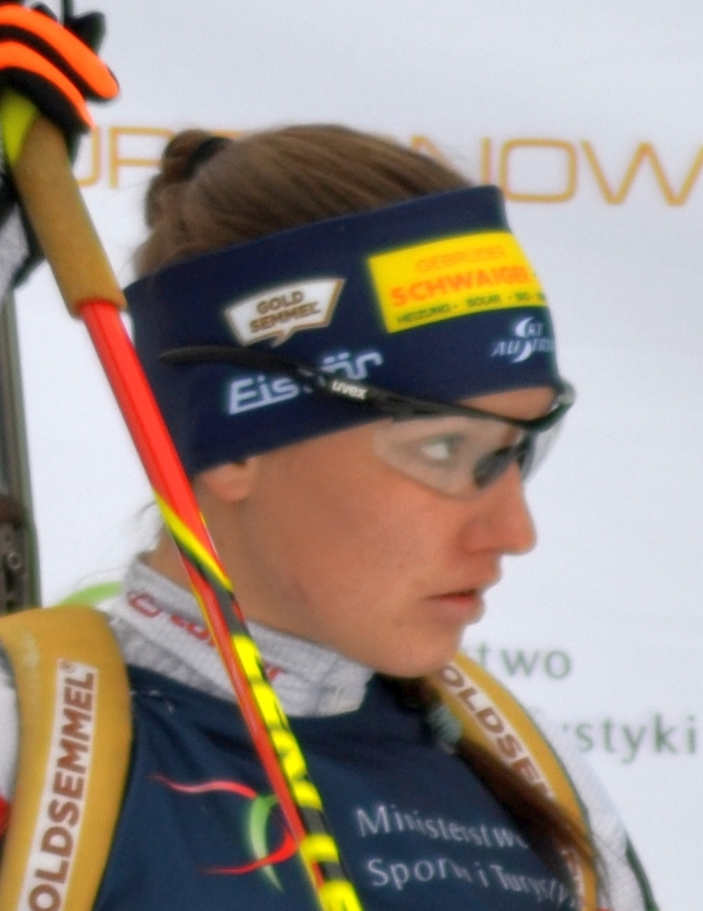

Personal information
- Nationality: Austrian
- Born: 17 August 1994 (age 31) Zell am See, Austria

Sport
- Country: Austria
- Sport: Biathlon
Medal record
Junior World Championships
Bronze medal – third place	2014 Presque Isle	3 × 6 km relay

Susanne Hoffmann (born 17 August 1994) is an Austrian biathlete. She was born in Zell am See. She has competed in the Biathlon World Cup, and represented Austria at the Biathlon World Championships 2016.
