= Sarah Beaudry =

Canadian biathlete

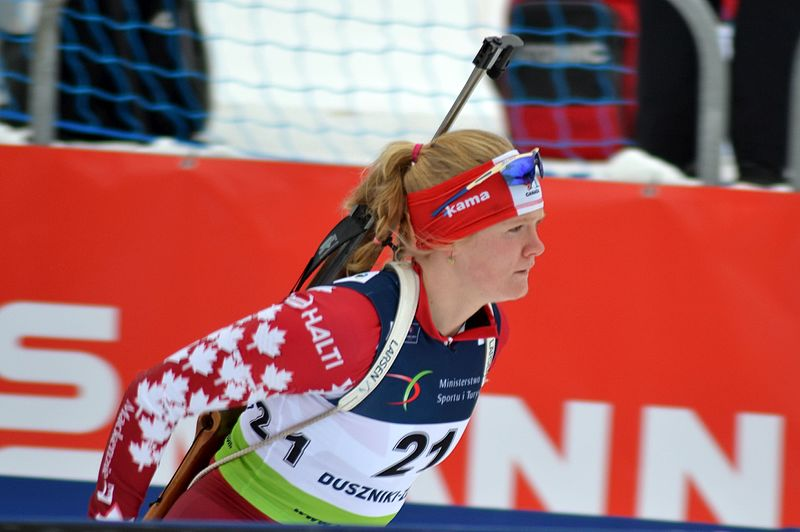
- Sarah Beaudry during the Open European Championships in Duszniki-Zdrój, Poland in January 2017

Personal information
- Nationality: Canadian
- Born: 19 March 1994 (age 32) Prince George, British Columbia
- Height: 183 cm (6 ft 0 in)

Sport
- Country: Canada
- Sport: Biathlon
Medal record
Junior World Championships
Bronze medal – third place	2014 Presque Isle	10 km pursuit

Sarah Beaudry (born 19 March 1994) is a Canadian biathlete. She has competed in the Biathlon World Cup, and represented Canada at the Biathlon World Championships 2016.

== Career ==
=== Winter Olympics ===
In January 2018, Beaudry was named to Canada's 2018 Olympic team.

In January 2022, Beaudry was named to Canada's 2022 Olympic team.

=== Olympic Games ===
0 medals

Event	Individual	Sprint	Pursuit	Mass start	Relay	Mixed relay
(South Korea) 2018 Pyeongchang	29th	—	—	—	10th	—
(China) 2022 Beijing	80th	80th	—	—	10th	14th

=== World Championships ===
0 medals

Event	Individual	Sprint	Pursuit	Mass start	Relay	Mixed relay	Single mixed relay
(Sweden) 2019 Östersund	64th	47th	42nd	—	14th	—	—
(Italy) 2020 Antholz	70th	—	—	—	—	—	—
(Slovenia) 2021 Pokljuka	51st	82nd	—	—	16th	—	—
