= Olena Bilosiuk =

Ukrainian biathlete (born 1987)

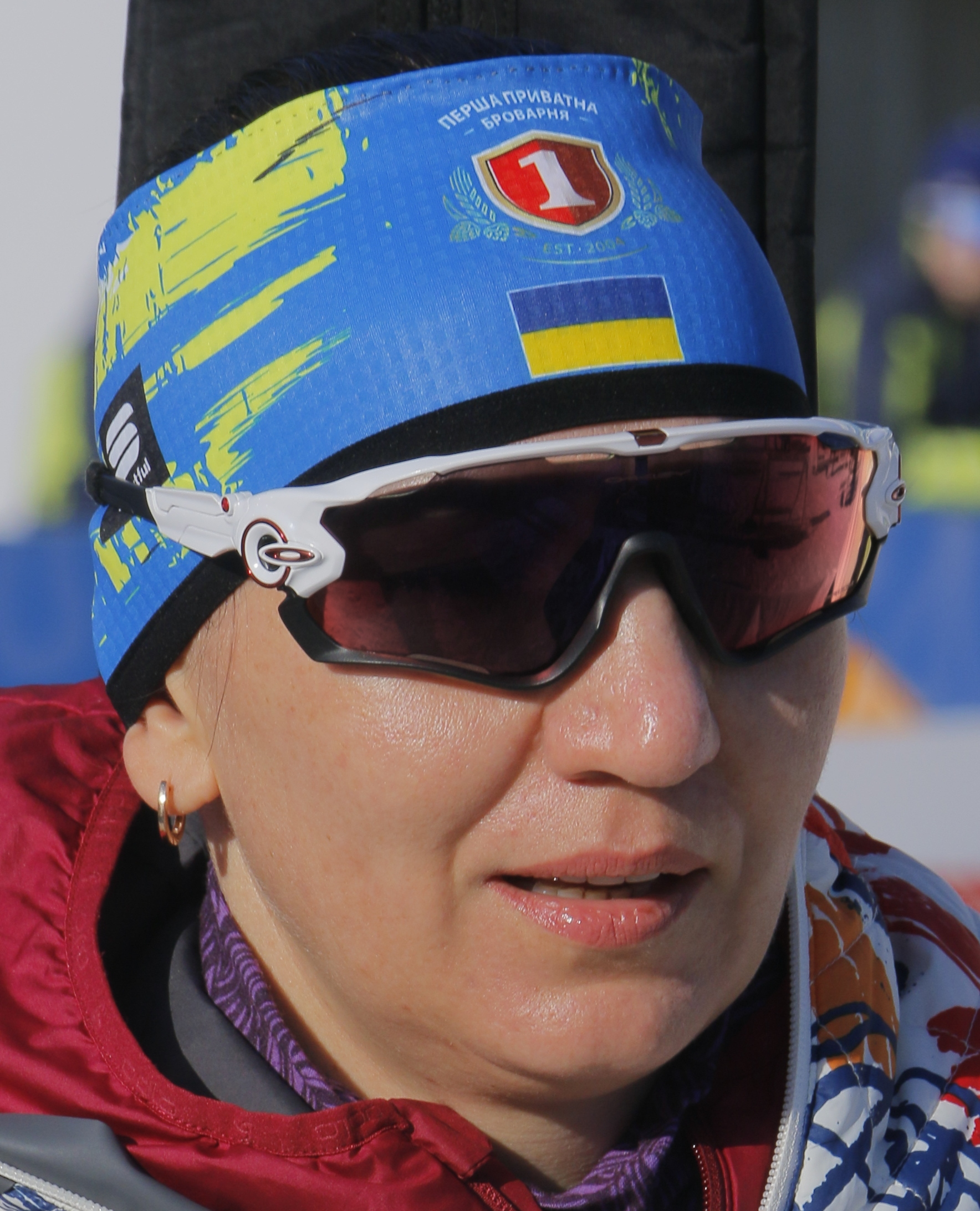
- Pidhrushna in 2023

Personal information
- Native name: Олена Білосюк
- Born: 9 January 1987 (age 39) Legnica, Poland
- Height: 1.75 m (5 ft 9 in)

Sport

Professional information
- Club: Kolos
- World Cup debut: 2 March 2007

Olympic Games
- Teams: 2 (2010, 2014)
- Medals: 1 (1 gold)

World Championships
- Teams: 7 (2009–2013, 2017, 2020, 2021)
- Medals: 6 (1 gold)

World Cup
- Seasons: 15 (2006/07, 2008/09–2013/14, 2015/16-present)
- Individual victories: 2
- All victories: 6
- Individual podiums: 8 (2 gold, 2 silver, 4 bronze)
- All podiums: 25 (6 gold, 12 silver, 7 bronze)
Medal record
Olympic Games
Gold medal – first place	2014 Sochi	Relay
World Championships
Gold medal – first place	2013 Nové Město	Sprint
Silver medal – second place	2013 Nové Město	Relay
Silver medal – second place	2017 Hochfilzen	Relay
Bronze medal – third place	2013 Nové Město	Pursuit
Bronze medal – third place	2020 Antholz	Relay
Bronze medal – third place	2021 Pokljuka	4 x 6 km relay
European Championships
Gold medal – first place	2009 Ufa	Relay
Gold medal – first place	2011 Ridanna	Relay
Gold medal – first place	2012 Osrblie	Sprint
Gold medal – first place	2012 Osrblie	Pursuit
Gold medal – first place	2012 Osrblie	Relay
Silver medal – second place	2010 Otepää	Relay
Silver medal – second place	2011 Ridanna	Individual
Silver medal – second place	2020 Raubichi	Super sprint
Junior World Championships
Bronze medal – third place	2006 Presque Isle	Individual
European Youth Olympic Festival
Bronze medal – third place	2005 Monthey	Sprint
Bronze medal – third place	2005 Monthey	Mixed relay

Olena Bilosiuk (Ukrainian: Олена Білосюк, romanized: Olena Bilosiuk, née Olena Pidhrushna (Ukrainian: Олена Михайлівна Підгрушна, romanized: Olena Mykhailivna Pidhrushna; born 9 January 1987) is a Ukrainian biathlete. She is Olympic and World champion and multiple medalist in different high-level competitions. Pidhrushna is considered one of Ukraine's most successful winter sports athletes. She lives in Ternopil.

== Career ==
Her first international competition was 2005 European Youth Olympic Winter Festival in Monthey, Switzerland, where she won two bronze medals, and 2005 Biathlon Junior World Championships in Kontiolahti, Finland. Next season she missed internationally, but on 2 March 2007, she debuted in Biathlon World Cup by finishing 44th in sprint in Lahti, Finland. She was enrolled in the national team for all three last World Cup stages that season but didn't gain any points. She didn't get a quota in the national team in 2007–08 season. That time she spent competing at Biathlon European Championships and junior competitions.

In 2008–09 season, she took part regularly in the relay team, and on 7 January 2009, she was in the winning relay team in German Oberhof.

She represented Ukraine at the 2010 Winter Olympics in Vancouver. Her best result at that Games was rank 12 in mass start.

2012–13 season became one of her most successful. In the first sprint race of that season on 1 December 2012, Olena finished third in Östersund, Sweden, and was second in pursuit in Italian Antholz-Anterselva in January 2013. Later on, Pidhrushna took a hat-trick of medals at the 2013 Biathlon World Championships, where she won the gold in the sprint, was part of the women's relay team which won silver, and secured a bronze in the pursuit. For these achievements, she was named Ukraine's best sportswoman of 2013. That season she ended ranking 8th in World Cup general classification.

2013–14 season started for her quite successfully, with one podium in January. Together with Juliya Dzhyma, Valj Semerenko and Vita Semerenko, she won the gold medal in the Women's relay at the 2014 Winter Olympics, in Sochi, Russia. Pidhrushna took a break in her sports career at the end of the 2013–14 season and was subsequently appointed Deputy Minister of Youth and Sports in the Ukrainian government. On 30 November 2014, she gave an interview for biathlon.com.ua, stating: "I took break in my sport career for a decree only. I can't do anything before the time the child will be born... so I must do something... I want fans to understand my decision and wait. I hope to be back in future, after the child will be born..." So she returned in November 2015. Her attempts to have a child were then unsuccessful. Later she divorced her husband.

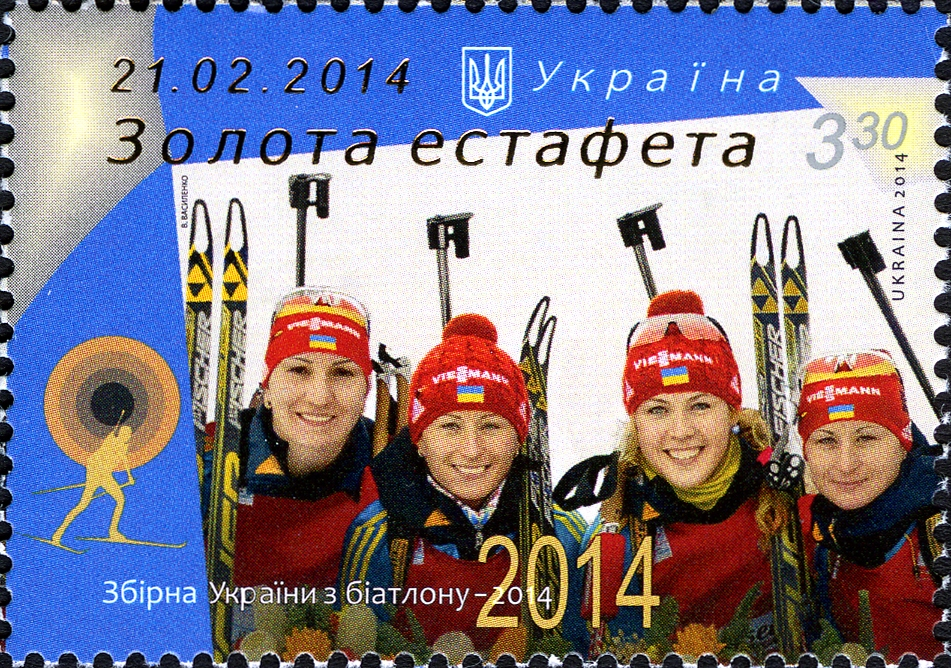
Stamps of Ukraine, 2014

She returned in 2015–16 season, which she started with two bronze medals in sprint and individual race in Swedish Östersund. In mid-February she won sprint in Canmore, Canada. That year she achieved her best World Cup ranking – 7. Next season Pidhrushna didn't have plenty of good results, and she missed all races in March.

She qualified to represent Ukraine at the 2018 Winter Olympics. Pidhrushna carried the Ukrainian flag during the opening ceremony of the 2018 Winter Olympics. Due to poor physical conditions, she didn't compete in any race.

== Biathlon results ==
=== Olympic Games ===
1 medal (1 gold)

Event	Individual	Sprint	Pursuit	Mass start	Relay	Mixed relay
(Canada) 2010 Vancouver	32nd	18th	21st	12th	6th	–
(Russia) 2014 Sochi	8th	26th	22nd	7th	Gold	–
(South Korea) 2018 Pyeongchang	Didn't compete					
(China) 2022 Beijing	–	–	–	–	7th	–

=== World Championships ===
5 medals (1 gold, 2 silver, 3 bronze)

Event	Individual	Sprint	Pursuit	Mass start	Relay	Mixed relay	Single mixed relay
(South Korea) 2009 Pyeongchang	16th	–	–	–	DNF	–	—N/a
(Russia) 2011 Khanty-Mansiysk	24th	31st	19th	24th	DSQ	–	—N/a
(Germany) 2012 Ruhpolding	14th	–	–	–	6th	–	—N/a
(Czech Republic) 2013 Nové Město na Moravě	11th	Gold	Bronze	11th	Silver	–	—N/a
(Norway) 2016 Oslo	DNF	16th	5th	18th	5th	4th	—N/a
(Austria) 2017 Hochfilzen	10th	34th	DNS	DNS	Silver	5th	—N/a
(Italy) 2020 Antholz-Anterselva	–	4th	13th	24th	Bronze	–	–
(Slovenia) 2021 Pokljuka	43rd	11th	7th	12th	Bronze	4th	–

=== World Cup ===
==== Individual podiums ====
Season	Place	Competition	Placement
2012–13	Östersund, Sweden	Sprint	2
2012–13	Antholz, Italy	Pursuit	2
2013–14	Oberhof, Germany	Sprint	3
2015–16	Östersund, Sweden	Individual	3
2015–16	Östersund, Sweden	Sprint	3
2015–16	Canmore, Canada	Sprint	1

==== Relay podiums ====
Season	Place	Competition	Placement
2008–09	Oberhof, Germany	Relay	1
2010–11	Hochfilzen, Austria	Relay	2
2010–11	Pokljuka, Slovenia	Mixed relay	2
2011–12	Kontiolahti, Finland	Mixed relay	2
2012–13	Hochfilzen, Austria	Relay	2
2012–13	Oberhof, Germany	Relay	1
2012–13	Sochi, Russia	Relay	2
2013–14	Östersund, Sweden	Mixed relay	3
2013–14	Hochfilzen, Austria	Relay	1
2013–14	Annecy-Le Grand Bornand, France	Relay	2
2015–16	Hochfilzen, Austria	Relay	3
2015–16	Ruhpolding, Germany	Relay	1
2015–16	Presque Isle, United States	Relay	2
2016–17	Pokljuka, Slovenia	Relay	3
2017–18	Hochfilzen, Austria	Relay	2

==== Rankings ====
Season	Individual	Sprint	Pursuit	Mass start	Overall
2008–09	28	70	52		52
2009–10	15	31	32	26	29
2010–11	21	29	26	27	26
2011–12	10	36	51	30	32
2012–13	19	8	4	14	8
2013–14	22	19	34	31	28
2014–15	missed				
2015–16	12	5	7	7	7
2016–17	5	37	55	30	33
2017–18		61	35		52
2018–19	34	38	67	36	43
2019–20	67	27	21	27	25

== Personal life ==
Olena was born in Legnica, Poland, but she spent her childhood in Velyka Berezovytsia near Ternopil, Ukraine. Her family had to move because her father was a military officer.

She graduated from Ternopil Volodymyr Hnatyuk National Pedagogical University, where she studied physical training and sports. Now she is a Ph.D. student at Lviv State University of Physical Culture.

Pidhrushna married Oleksiy Kayda on 26 May 2013. Kayda is a member of Verkhovna Rada (Ukraine's parliament) for the party Svoboda. According to Pidhrushna, her husband was attacked in December 2013 by "provocateurs" during the Euromaidan demonstrations. In October 2016 she declared that they divorced.

During the awarding ceremony after her victory in the women's relay in Hochfilzen on 8 December 2013, she and other Ukrainian biathletes shouted "For Maidan". Pidhrushna gained at a news conference after her women's relay victory at the 2014 Winter Olympics a minute's silence in memory of the people who died in Kyiv in the February 2014 Euromaidan riots.

In summer 2021 Pidhrushna married the second time, with former Ukrainian cross-country skier Ivan Bilosiuk, but in January 2025 she declared that they divorced.
