= Terézia Poliaková =

Slovak biathlete

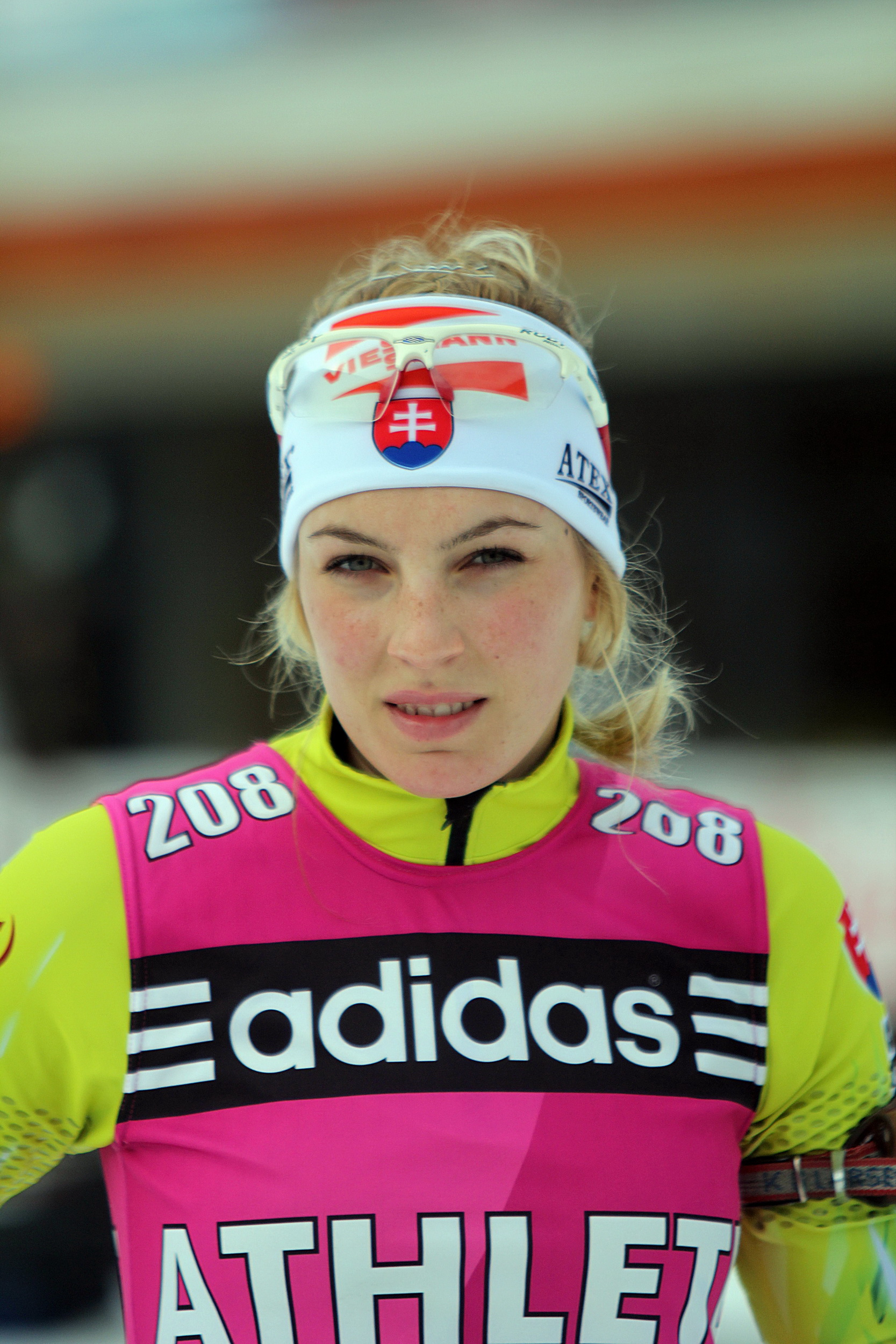

Personal information
- Full name: Terézia Poliaková
- Born: 2 April 1989 (age 37) Brezno, Czechoslovakia (present day Slovakia)
- Height: 1.70 m (5 ft 7 in)

Sport

Professional information
- Sport: Biathlon
- Club: SV Union Frojach
- World Cup debut: 29 November 2012

Olympic Games
- Teams: 2 (2014, 2018)
- Medals: 0

World Championships
- Teams: 3 (2013, 2015, 2016)
- Medals: 0

World Cup
- Seasons: 3 (2012/13–)
- All victories: 0
- All podiums: 0
Medal record
Women's biathlon
Representing Slovakia
Summer World Championships
Bronze medal – third place	2013 Forni Avoltri	Mixed relay

Terézia Poliaková (born 2 April 1989) is a Slovak former biathlete.

== Career ==
She competed at the 2013 and 2015 World Championships, and at the 2014 and 2018 Winter Olympics.

== Record ==
=== Olympic Games ===
Event	Individual	Sprint	Pursuit	Mass start	Relay	Mixed relay^{[a]}
(Russia) 2014 Sochi	66th	–	–	–	14th	–
(South Korea) 2018 Pyeongchang	87th	83th	–	–	5th	–

=== World Championships ===
Event	Individual	Sprint	Pursuit	Mass start	Relay	Mixed relay
(Czech Republic) 2013 Nové Město	47th	—	—	—	—	—
(Finland) 2015 Kontiolahti	37th	57th	49th	—	19th	—
(Norway) 2016 Oslo	—	39th	58th	—	14th	—
(Sweden) 2019 Östersund	47th	86th	—	—	6th	—
