= Veronika Zvařičová =

Czech biathlete (born 1988)

Personal information
- Born: December 8, 1988 (age 37) Krnov, Czechoslovakia

Sport
- Sport: Skiing
Medal record
Women's biathlon
Representing Czech Republic
Junior World Championships
Gold medal – first place	2009 Canmore	3 × 6 km relay
European Championships
Silver medal – second place	2013 Bansko	4 x 6 km relay

Veronika Zvařičová (born December 8, 1988, in Krnov) is a retired Czech biathlete.

== Career ==
Zvařičová competed in the 2010 Winter Olympics for the Czech Republic. She finished 71st in the sprint.

As of February 2013, her best performance at the Biathlon World Championships is 10th, as part of the Czech women's relay team, in 2012. Her best individual result at the Biathlon World Championships is 22nd, in the 2009 sprint.

As of February 2013, Zvařičová has won one Biathlon World Cup medal, a bronze with the Czech women's relay team at Ruhpolding in 2012/13. Her best individual performance in a Biathlon World Cup event is 34th, in the sprint at Östersund in 2012/13. Her best overall finish in the Biathlon World Cup is 79th, in 2008/09.

== World Cup podiums ==
Season	Location	Event	Rank
2012/13	Ruhpolding	Relay	3rd place, bronze medalist(s)
