= Martina Chrapánová =

Slovak biathlete

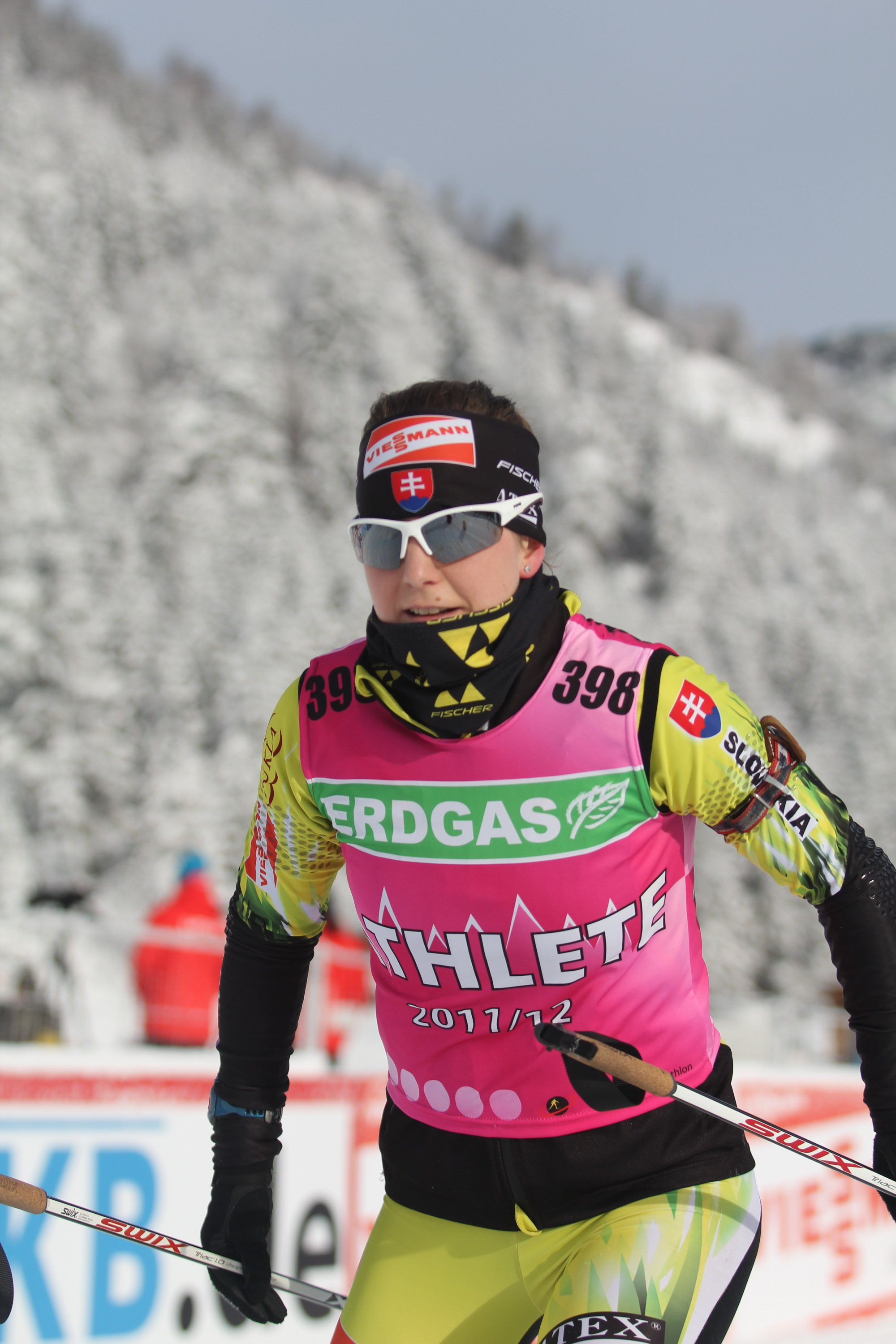
- Chrapánová in Hochfilzen in 2011.

Personal information
- Full name: Martina Chrapánová
- Born: 14 December 1989 (age 36) Revúca, Czechoslovakia (present day Slovakia)

Sport

Professional information
- Sport: Biathlon
- Club: VŠC Dukla Banská Bystrica
- World Cup debut: 12 December 2008

Olympic Games
- Teams: 1 (2014)
- Medals: 0

World Championships
- Teams: 5 (2011, 2012, 2013, 2015, 2016)
- Medals: 0

World Cup
- Seasons: 7 (2008/09, 2010/11–2015/16)
- All victories: 0
- All podiums: 0
Medal record
Representing Slovakia
Women's biathlon

Martina Chrapánová (born 14 December 1989) is a former Slovak biathlete.

== Career ==
Her best World Cup finish was 37th in a 10 km sprint event in Hochfilzen in 2012.

Chrapánová retired from biathlon after the end of the 2015–16 season.
