= Anastasia Zagoruiko =

Russian biathlete

Personal information
- Native name: Анастасия Геннадиевна Загоруйко
- Full name: Anastasia Gennadievna Zagoruiko
- Nationality: Russian
- Born: 15 October 1988 (age 37) Zavodoukovsk, Tyumen Oblast, Soviet Union

Sport

Professional information
- Club: CSKA
- World Cup debut: 11 February 2012

World Cup
- Seasons: 5 (2011/12–)
- All races: 24
- All podiums: 1
Medal record
Junior World Championships
Silver medal – second place	2009 Canmore	12.5 km individual
Silver medal – second place	2009 Canmore	3 × 6 km relay
Bronze medal – third place	2008 Ruhpolding	3 × 6 km relay
European Championships
Gold medal – first place	2012 Osrblie	15 km individual
Silver medal – second place	2012 Osrblie	4 × 6 km relay
Bronze medal – third place	2012 Osrblie	10 km pursuit
Gold medal – first place	2013 Bansko	15 km individual
Gold medal – first place	2016 Tyumen	2x6 + 2x7.5 km relay
Silver medal – second place	2018 Ridnaun	2x6 + 2x7.5 km relay
World Military Games
Silver medal – second place	2017 Sochi	15 km patrol race
- Updated on 17 December 2016

Anastasia Gennadievna Zagoruiko (Russian: Анастасия Геннадиевна Загоруйко; born 15 October 1988) is a Russian biathlete. She competes in the Biathlon World Cup, and represents Russia at the Biathlon World Championships 2016.
