= Gabriela Soukalová =

Czech biathlete (born 1989)

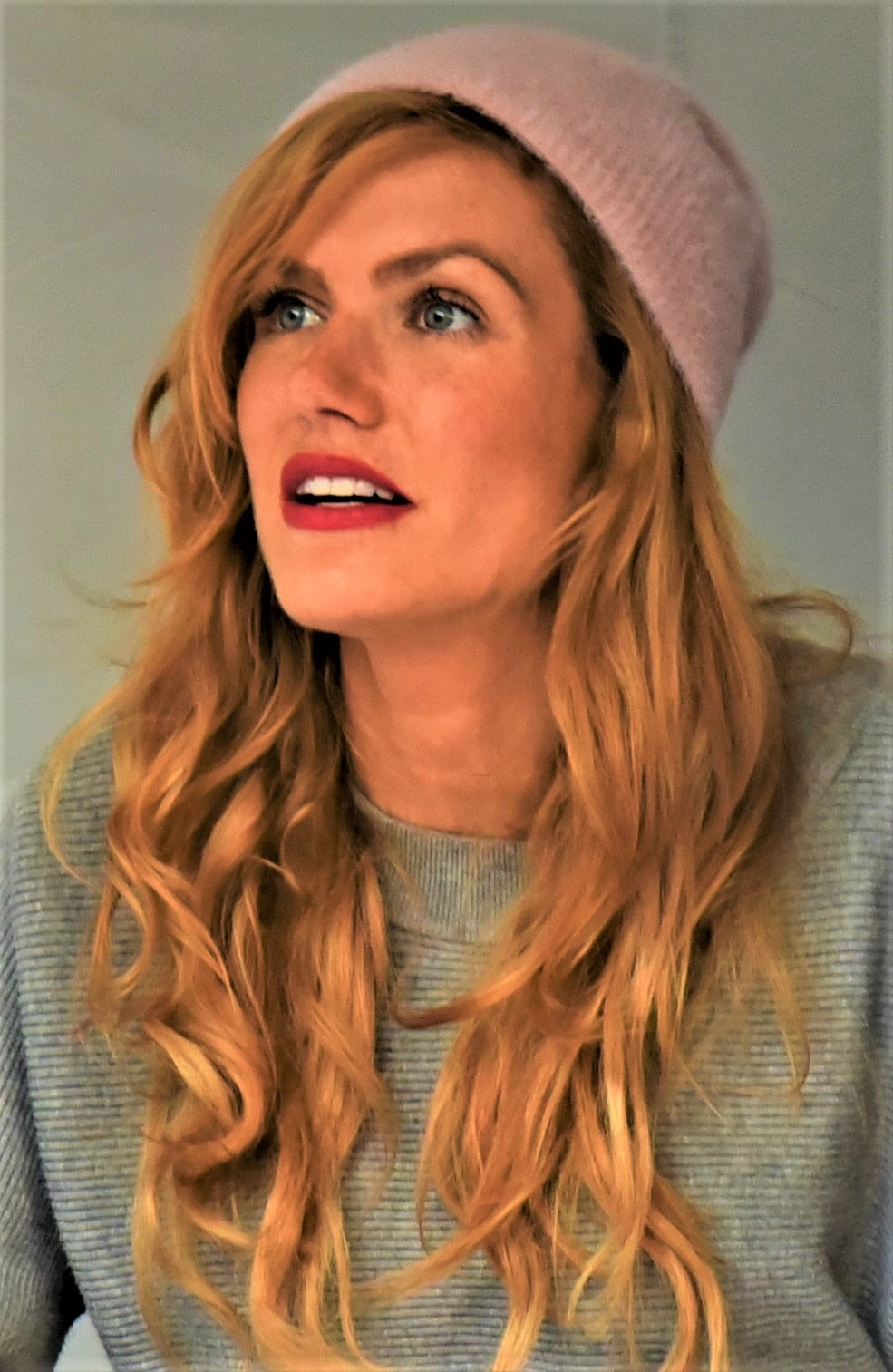
- Soukalová in 2019

Personal information
- Full name: Gabriela Soukalová
- Born: 1 November 1989 (age 37) Jablonec nad Nisou, Czechoslovakia
- Height: 1.70 m (5 ft 7 in)
- Weight: 61 kg (134 lb)

Sport

Professional information
- Sport: Biathlon
- Club: SG Jablonec nad Nisou
- Skis: Fischer
- World Cup debut: 11 December 2009

Olympic Games
- Teams: 2 (2010, 2014)
- Medals: 3 (0 gold)

World Championships
- Teams: 5 (2010, 2011, 2013, 2015, 2016, 2017)
- Medals: 6 (2 gold)

World Cup
- Seasons: 8 (2009/10–2016/17)
- Individual victories: 17
- All victories: 23
- Individual podiums: 39
- All podiums: 56
- Overall titles: 1 (2015–16)
- Discipline titles: 6: 1 individual (2013–14); 2 sprint (2015–16, 2016–17); 1 pursuit (2015–16); 2 mass start (2015–16, 2016–17)
Medal record
Women's biathlon
Representing Czech Republic
Olympic Games
Silver medal – second place	2014 Sochi	12.5 km mass start
Silver medal – second place	2014 Sochi	Mixed relay
Bronze medal – third place	2014 Sochi	4 x 6 km relay
World Championships
Gold medal – first place	2015 Kontiolahti	Mixed relay
Gold medal – first place	2017 Hochfilzen	7.5 km sprint
Silver medal – second place	2015 Kontiolahti	15 km individual
Silver medal – second place	2017 Hochfilzen	15 km individual
Bronze medal – third place	2013 Nové Město	Mixed relay
Bronze medal – third place	2017 Hochfilzen	10 km pursuit
Junior World Championships
Gold medal – first place	2009 Canmore	3 × 6 km relay
European Championships
Silver medal – second place	2011 Ridnaun	7.5 km sprint

Gabriela Soukalová, formerly Koukalová (Czech pronunciation: [ˈɡabrɪjɛla ˈsoukalovaː]) (born 1 November 1989) is a Czech former biathlete and television presenter for TV Prima. She won three Olympic medals at the 2014 Sochi Games and she is a two-time World Championship winner, gold medalist at the 2015 Kontiolahti in mixed relay and gold medalist at 2017 Hochfilzen in 7.5 km sprint. In the 2015/2016 World Cup season she was overall champion, and she has also taken six discipline Crystal Globes: the 2013/2014 individual title, the 2015/2016 sprint, pursuit and mass-start titles, and the 2016/17 sprint and mass start titles.

== Career ==
Soukalová began her biathlon career in 2005. In 2007 Soukalová became a member of the national team, and in 2008 she took part in the Biathlon Junior World Championship. Her first experience at the international level was not very good: Soukalová's shooting accuracy and ski speed were at that time not as strong as many of her peers, and her best result at the 2008 Junior Worlds was a 22nd place. Nevertheless, her coaches gave her a chance to take part in further international competitions, including the IBU Cup in the 2008/09 season. Her performances improved: Soukalová, despite some difficulties in shooting, became better than Olga Vilukhina and helped the Czech women's relay team to win a gold at the 2009 Junior World Championships.

Soukalová made her debut on the Biathlon World Cup in December 2009. Her coaches subsequently made the decision to move her back down to the IBU Cup, but her period at that level was relatively brief after she regularly took good results and won a silver medal in the sprint at the 2011 European Championships. She was selected to represent the Czech Republic in the World Cup and at the 2010 Winter Olympics.

Her first significant success was in December 2011: in a World Cup mixed relay in Austria she helped to secure the Czech team second place. During the 2012–13 season she took four wins in the Biathlon World Cup. She added three more wins in the 2013–14 World Cup season. At the 2014 Winter Olympics, she finished fourth in both the 10 km pursuit and 15 km individual before winning silver medals in both the 12.5 km mass start and mixed relay (together with Veronika Vítková, Jaroslav Soukup and Ondřej Moravec).

At the World Championships 2015 in Kontiolahti Soukalová took her first world championship title in the mixed relay as a member of the successful Czech team. In the sprint race she took 18th place with three penalties, but in the pursuit she was able to climb to fifth place. In the individual race Soukalová won a silver medal, which became her second medal at these World Championships. At the final World Cup meeting of the season in Khanty-Mansiysk Soukalová managed to win a silver medal in the mass start. In the final overall World Cup rankings for 2014/15, she finished in sixth place with 752 points.

In the 2015/2016 season put in strong performances: at the fifth round of the World Cup on 4 January 2016, even two missed targets did not prevent her from making the podium. Gabriela showed good consistency, finishing no lower than 11th place during the season, and continued to lead the World Cup standings. In the 12.5 km mass start on 16 January 2016 she won and got her tenth victory in the Biathlon World Cup. She also helped to win a silver for the team in the 4x6 km relay on 24 January 2016, and took a third place in the mass start in Canada on 6 February 2016. In the US at Presque Isle on 11 February 2016 in sprint, she got the best result showing perfect accuracy and an excellent performance. The following days brought two gold medals in the 10 km pursuit and 4x6 km relay. Despite some poorer results in Norway, Soukalová took a better result in the sprint in Khanty-Mansiysk in Russia on 17 March 2016 clinching her the small Crystal Globe in the sprint with a total of 413 points. On the next day in the pursuit she got a fourth place, but with a very good level both in speed and shooting. She also took a second small Crystal Globe in the mass start with 241 points. She led the standings in the 2015/2016 World Cup from start to finish, and won the overall Crystal Globe on 20 March 2016 with a final score of 1074 points.

The 2016/2017 season started in Östersund, Sweden on 27 November 2016, where she and her teammates took 7th place in the mixed relay. The 15 km race on 30 November 2016 brought a 17th place, but later on, on 3 December 2016, she took third place in the 7.5 km sprint, and the next day she showed even better results - winning the pursuit, showing an excellent performance both in skiing and shooting. The next medal (first place) was taken in a mass start race on December 18, 2016.

On 21 December 2017 she became the first biathlete to be named Czech Sportsperson of the Year. Due to a leg injury she did not start in the 2017/2018 season, and later revealed that she will possibly not return to the World Cup ever again. On 28 May 2019 she announced her retirement.

On 16 February 2024, Soukalová was introduced into the IBU Hall of Fame along with Magdalena Forsberg and Raphaël Poirée.

== Personal life ==
She is the daughter of Gabriela Svobodová, a former cross-country skier, who won an Olympic silver medal in the 4 x 5 km relay at Sarajevo in 1984. Later, her mother helps as a personal trainer.

In summer 2014, Soukalová started dating Czech professional badminton player Petr Koukal. They married on 13 May 2016, in the historic unfinished church in Panenský Týnec. They divorced in September or October 2020.

In April 2018 she published her autobiography Jiná (meaning Different), in which she revealed a long history of eating disorders.

In December 2020 Soukalová posed for Czech version of Playboy magazine and charity calendar. On 1 March 2021 Soukalová announced her pregnancy with her new partner Miloš Kadeřábek and return to her birth name. On 16 September 2021, Soukalová announced the birth of her daughter Izabela Gabriela.

On 5 March 2024 in movie theatre Cinema City Slovanský dům, Prague premiered documentary about Soukalová named Gabriela Soukalová: Pravda se pořád vyplatí (Gabriela Soukalová: The truth always pays off) directed by Petr Větrovský. Soukalová sang duet with Štefan Margita named Teď budu mluvit já (Now I will speak) for her documentary.

On 29 August 2026, Soukalová announced the birth of her second daughter Gloria Gabriela with the same partner.

== Biathlon results ==
All results are sourced from the International Biathlon Union.

=== Olympic Games ===
- 3 medals (2 silver, 1 bronze)

Event	Individual	Sprint	Pursuit	Mass start	Relay	Mixed relay^{[a]}
(Canada) 2010 Vancouver	60th	–	–	–	16th	—N/a
(Russia) 2014 Sochi	4th	29th	4th	Silver	Bronze	Silver

a. ^{1} The mixed relay was added as an event in 2014.

=== World Championships ===
- 6 medals (2 gold, 2 silver, 2 bronze)

Event	Individual	Sprint	Pursuit	Mass start	Relay	Mixed relay
(Russia) 2010 Khanty-Mansiysk^{[a]}	—N/a	—N/a	—N/a	—N/a	—N/a	7th
(Russia) 2011 Khanty-Mansiysk	47th	25th	22nd	–	11th	11th
(Czech Republic) 2013 Nové Město	12th	14th	20th	18th	10th	Bronze
(Finland) 2015 Kontiolahti	Silver	18th	5th	5th	8th	Gold
(Norway) 2016 Oslo	5th	4th	11th	4th	6th	6th
(Austria) 2017 Hochfilzen	Silver	Gold	Bronze	4th	4th	7th

a. ^{1} During Olympic seasons competitions are only held for those events not included in the Olympic program.

=== World Cup ===
Season	Overall			Sprint			Pursuit			Individual			Mass start		
Season	Races	Points	Position	Races	Points	Position	Races	Points	Position	Races	Points	Position	Races	Points	Position
2012/13	24/26	800	6th	9/10	313	6th	7/8	227	8th	3/3	94	7th	5/5	166	7th
2013/14	18/22	613	4th	8/9	238	5th	6/8	203	10th	2/2	120	1st	2/3	52	23rd
2014/15	25/25	752	6th	10/10	281	9th	7/7	195	7th	3/3	86	6th	5/5	200	4th
2015/16	25/25	1074	1st	9/9	413	1st	8/8	354	1st	3/3	128	3rd	5/5	241	1st
2016/17	26/26	1089	2nd	9/9	377	1st	9/9	384	2nd	3/3	95	4th	5/5	265	1st

=== Individual victories ===
- 17 victories – (7 SP, 4 PU, 2 IN, 4 MS)
- 39 podiums

No.	Season	Date	Location	Discipline	Level	Place
1	2012/13	14 December 2012	Pokljuka, Slovenia	7.5 km sprint	World Cup	1st
2	2012/13	15 December 2012	Pokljuka, Slovenia	10 km pursuit	World Cup	2nd
3	2012/13	16 December 2012	Pokljuka, Slovenia	12.5 km mass start	World Cup	3rd
4	2012/13	14 March 2013	Khanty-Mansiysk, Russia	7.5 km sprint	World Cup	1st
5	2012/13	16 March 2013	Khanty-Mansiysk, Russia	10 km pursuit	World Cup	1st
6	2012/13	17 March 2013	Khanty-Mansiysk, Russia	12.5 km mass start	World Cup	1st
7	2013/14	28 November 2013	Östersund, Sweden	15 km individual	World Cup	1st
8	2013/14	10 January 2014	Ruhpolding, Germany	15 km individual	World Cup	1st
9	2013/14	12 January 2014	Ruhpolding, Germany	10 km pursuit	World Cup	1st
10	2013/14	17 February 2014	Sochi, Russia	12.5 km mass start	Olympic Games	2nd
11	2013/14	15 March 2014	Kontiolahti, Finland	7.5 km sprint	World Cup	3rd
12	2014/15	18 December 2014	Pokljuka, Slovenia	7.5 km sprint	World Cup	1st
13	2014/15	11 March 2015	Kontiolahti, Finland	15 km individual	World Championships	2nd
14	2014/15	22 March 2015	Khanty-Mansiysk, Russia	12.5 km mass start	World Cup	2nd
15	2015/16	2 December 2015	Östersund, Sweden	7.5 km sprint	World Cup	1st
16	2015/16	12 December 2015	Hochfilzen, Austria	10 km pursuit	World Cup	3rd
17	2015/16	20 December 2015	Pokljuka, Slovenia	12.5 km mass start	World Cup	2nd
18	2015/16	8 January 2016	Ruhpolding, Germany	7.5 km sprint	World Cup	2nd
19	2015/16	9 January 2016	Ruhpolding, Germany	10 km pursuit	World Cup	2nd
20	2015/16	14 January 2016	Ruhpolding, Germany	15 km individual	World Cup	3rd
21	2015/16	16 January 2016	Ruhpolding, Germany	12.5 km mass start	World Cup	1st
22	2015/16	6 February 2016	Canmore, Canada	12.5 km mass start	World Cup	3rd
23	2015/16	11 February 2016	(United States) Presque Isle, USA	7.5 km sprint	World Cup	1st
24	2015/16	12 February 2016	(United States) Presque Isle, USA	10 km pursuit	World Cup	1st
25	2015/16	17 March 2016	Khanty-Mansiysk, Russia	7.5 km sprint	World Cup	2nd
26	2016/17	3 December 2016	Östersund, Sweden	7.5 km sprint	World Cup	3rd
27	2016/17	4 December 2016	Östersund, Sweden	10 km pursuit	World Cup	1st
28	2016/17	18 December 2016	Nové Město, Czech Republic	12.5 km mass start	World Cup	1st
29	2016/17	6 January 2017	Oberhof, Germany	7.5 km sprint	World Cup	1st
30	2016/17	7 January 2017	Oberhof, Germany	10 km pursuit	World Cup	2nd
31	2016/17	8 January 2017	Oberhof, Germany	12.5 km mass start	World Cup	1st
32	2016/17	14 January 2017	Ruhpolding, Germany	7.5 km sprint	World Cup	2nd
33	2016/17	15 January 2017	Ruhpolding, Germany	10 km pursuit	World Cup	2nd
34	2016/17	21 January 2017	Antholz-Anterselva, Italy	12.5 km mass start	World Cup	3rd
35	2016/17	10 February 2017	Hochfilzen, Austria	7.5 km sprint	World Championships	1st
36	2016/17	12 February 2017	Hochfilzen, Austria	10 km pursuit	World Championships	3rd
37	2016/17	15 February 2017	Hochfilzen, Austria	15 km individual	World Championships	2nd
38	2016/17	18 March 2017	Oslo Holmenkollen, Norway	10 km pursuit	World Cup	2nd
39	2016/17	19 March 2017	Oslo Holmenkollen, Norway	12.5 km mass start	World Cup	2nd

=== Relay victories ===
- 6 victories – (4 RL, 2 MR)

No.	Season	Date	Location	Discipline	Level	Teammates
1	2013/14	24 November 2013	Östersund, Sweden	Mixed 2x6+2x7.5 km relay	World Cup	Vítková / Vítek / Moravec
2	2014/15	7 January 2015	Oberhof, Germany	4x6 km relay	World Cup	Puskarčíková / Landová / Vítková
3	2014/15	14 January 2015	Ruhpolding, Germany	4x6 km relay	World Cup	Puskarčíková / Landová / Vítková
4	2014/15	15 February 2015	Holmenkollen, Norway	4x6 km Relay	World Cup	Puskarčíková / Landová / Vítková
5	2014/15	5 March 2015	Kontiolahti, Finland	Mixed 2x6+2x7.5 km relay	World Championships	Vítková / Šlesingr / Moravec
6	2015/16	14 February 2016	(United States) Presque Isle, USA	4x6 km relay	World Cup	Puskarčíková / Charvátová / Vítková

=== Overall record ===
Result	Individual	Sprint	Pursuit	Mass start	Relay	Mixed relay	Total		
Result	Individual	Sprint	Pursuit	Mass start	Relay	Mixed relay	Individual events	Team events	All events
1st place	2	7	4	4	4	2	17	6	23
2nd place	2	3	5	4	2	3	14	5	19
3rd place	1	2	2	3	3	3	8	6	14
Podiums	5	12	11	11	9	8	39	17	56
Top 10	11	27	24	18	23	13	80	36	116
Points	14	46	40	23	27	15	123	42	165
Others	4	7	2	–	–	–	13	–	13
DNF	–	–	–	–	–	–	–	–	–
DSQ	–	1	–	–	–	–	1	–	1
Starts	18	54	42	23	27	15	137	42	179

* Results in all UIPMB and IBU World Cup races, Olympics and World Championships. Statistics as of 19 March 2017.

=== Shooting ===
Shooting	2009–10 season		2010–11 season		2011–12 season		2012–13 season		2013–14 season		2014–15 season		2015–16 season		2016–17 season		2017–18 season		Career	
Prone position	44 / 56	78.6%	43 / 54	79.6%	36 / 46	78.3%	198 / 228	86.8%	185 / 210	88.1%	220 / 244	90.2%	229 / 241	95.0%	237 / 260	91.2%	—	—	1192 / 1339	88.9%
Standing position	48 / 57	84.2%	35 / 54	64.8%	38 / 48	79.2%	194 / 232	83.6%	177 / 212	83.5%	210 / 250	84.0%	220 / 247	89.1%	225 / 265	84.9%	—	—	1147 / 1365	84.0%
Total	92 / 113	81.4%	78 / 108	72.2%	74 / 94	78.7%	392 / 460	85.2%	362 / 422	85.8%	430 / 494	87.0%	449 / 488	92.0%	462 / 525	88.0%	—	—	2339 / 2704	86.5%

* Results in all IBU World Cup races, Olympics and World Championships including relay events and disqualified races. Statistics as of 20 March 2018.

Awards
Preceded by Lukáš Krpálek	Czech Athlete of the Year; 2017	Succeeded by Ester Ledecká
