= 2015–16 Biathlon World Cup – Pursuit Men =

The 2015–16 Biathlon World Cup – Pursuit Men started on Thursday December 3, 2015 in Östersund and will finish in March 2016 in Khanty-Mansiysk. The defending titlist is Martin Fourcade of France.

== Competition format ==
The 12.5 kilometres (7.8 mi) pursuit race is skied over five laps. The biathlete shoots four times at any shooting lane, in the order of prone, prone, standing, standing, totalling 20 targets. For each missed target a biathlete has to run a penalty loop. Competitors' starts are staggered, according to the result of the previous sprint race.

== 2014–15 Top 3 Standings ==
Medal	Athlete	Points
Gold:	(France) Martin Fourcade	335
Silver:	(Russia) Anton Shipulin	305
Bronze:	(Slovenia) Jakov Fak	282

== Medal winners ==
Event:	Gold:	Time	Silver:	Time	Bronze:	Time
Östersund details	Martin Fourcade; France	31:22.4 (1+0+1+1)	Arnd Peiffer; Germany	31:57.5 (0+1+0+0)	Quentin Fillon Maillet; France	32:17.6 (0+0+1+1)
Hochfilzen details	Martin Fourcade; France	31:19.9 (0+2+0+0)	Simon Schempp; Germany	31:28.8 (0+0+1+0)	Anton Shipulin; Russia	31:39.0 (0+0+2+0)
Pokljuka details	Simon Schempp; Germany	30:46.5 (0+0+0+0)	Martin Fourcade; France	31:03.1 (0+0+0+1)	Anton Shipulin; Russia	31:09.9 (0+1+1+0)
Ruhpolding details	Simon Eder; Austria	33:19.1 (1+0+0+0)	Martin Fourcade; France	33:23.3 (0+0+1+1)	Michal Šlesingr; Czech Republic	33:24.2 (0+0+0+0)
Antholz-Anterselva details	Anton Shipulin; Russia	31:51.9 (0+1+0+1)	Simon Schempp; Germany	32:02.2 (0+0+0+1)	Johannes Thingnes Bø; Norway	32:06.0 (2+0+1+0)
Presque Isle details	Martin Fourcade; France	31:04.4 (1+1+0+0)	Johannes Thingnes Bø; Norway	31:29.2 (1+0+0+2)	Anton Shipulin; Russia	32:15.9 (1+0+0+1)
World Championships details	Martin Fourcade; France	32:56.5 (0+0+1+2)	Ole Einar Bjørndalen; Norway	33:16.6 (1+0+0+1)	Emil Hegle Svendsen; Norway	33:27.7 (0+0+0+1)
Khanty-Mansiysk details	Simon Schempp; Germany	33:27.8 (1+1+0+1)	Johannes Thingnes Bø; Norway	33:36.3 (0+0+0+1)	Erik Lesser; Germany	33:43.5 (0+0+1+1)

== Standings ==
#	Name	ÖST	HOC	POK	RU1	ANT	PRE	WCH	KHA	Total
1	Martin Fourcade (FRA)	60	60	54	54	43	60	60	DNS	391
2	Anton Shipulin (RUS)	26	48	48	17	60	48	32	21	300
3	Johannes Thingnes Bø (NOR)	25	18	—	36	48	54	43	54	278
4	Tarjei Bø (NOR)	43	43	43	43	34	22	10	29	267
5	Simon Eder (AUT)	29	29	—	60	38	43	25	30	254
6	Simon Schempp (GER)	—	54	60	—	54	—	23	60	251
7	Emil Hegle Svendsen (NOR)	40	36	36	40	29	—	48	—	229
8	Evgeniy Garanichev (RUS)	34	27	38	32	31	—	30	27	219
9	Erik Lesser (GER)	14	16	29	7	23	28	36	48	201
10	Arnd Peiffer (GER)	54	—	14	13	40	DNF	28	32	181
11	Michal Šlesingr (CZE)	21	—	5	48	9	38	29	31	181
12	Tim Burke (USA)	2	14	32	15	19	36	24	38	180
13	Benedikt Doll (GER)	38	22	28	—	18	29	2	40	177
14	Quentin Fillon Maillet (FRA)	48	34	40	22	DNS	DNF	31	DNF	175
15	Ole Einar Bjørndalen (NOR)	30	38	34	—	11	—	54	DNS	167
16	Andreas Birnbacher (GER)	23	32	30	26	27	26	—	—	164
17	Dominik Landertinger (AUT)	0	40	—	30	32	—	27	34	163
18	Andrejs Rastorgujevs (LAT)	5	15	20	29	20	20	14	28	151
19	Serhiy Semenov (UKR)	0	26	2	6	22	16	34	26	132
20	Simon Desthieux (FRA)	20	19	17	16	DNS	2	38	18	130
21	Nathan Smith (CAN)	31	23	6	38	0	—	26	—	124
22	Julian Eberhard (AUT)	0	11	18	23	15	19	15	23	124
23	Lowell Bailey (USA)	—	28	12	19	13	27	5	19	123
24	Michal Krčmář (CZE)	17	—	0	20	28	13	19	24	121
25	Maxim Tsvetkov (RUS)	10	30	24	24	30	DNS	0	0	118
26	Fredrik Lindström (SWE)	4	24	27	18	—	DNS	7	36	116
27	Benjamin Weger (SUI)	0	17	3	0	25	24	DNF	43	112
28	Ondřej Moravec (CZE)	22	21	15	34	0	—	DNS	16	108
29	Jakov Fak (SLO)	0	31	10	—	26	—	40	—	107
30	Krasimir Anev (BUL)	15	4	19	25	24	—	12	4	103
31	Simon Fourcade (FRA)	27	—	31	28	DNF	6	1	—	93
32	Alexey Slepov (RUS)	28	12	16	0	21	—	—	14	91
33	Vladimir Iliev (BUL)	24	—	4	DNF	8	34	17	0	87
34	Dmytro Pidruchnyi (UKR)	32	0	22	31	DNS	—	DNS	—	85
35	Dmitry Malyshko (RUS)	36	25	8	5	—	DNS	—	8	82
36	Oleksander Zhyrnyi (UKR)	—	—	1	1	17	25	16	22	82
37	Dominik Windisch (ITA)	—	0	23	—	14	0	13	25	75
38	Sven Grossegger (AUT)	18	10	0	27	DNS	18	0	—	73
39	Jean Guillaume Beatrix (FRA)	13	13	26	11	DNF	9	—	0	72
40	Lukas Hofer (ITA)	—	20	9	0	7	3	—	20	59
41	Klemen Bauer (SLO)	12	9	21	—	—	15	0	—	57
42	Anton Babikov (RUS)	—	—	—	—	36	—	20	—	56
43	Erlend Bjøntegaard (NOR)	—	—	—	14	—	40	—	—	54
44	Artem Pryma (UKR)	0	3	—	—	5	32	9	—	49
45	Lars Helge Birkeland (NOR)	16	DNS	—	21	—	11	—	—	48
46	Serafin Wiestner (SUI)	—	—	0	8	4	14	21	DNS	47
47	Brendan Green (CAN)	3	7	11	—	10	—	8	5	44
48	Matej Kazár (SVK)	6	0	0	—	12	23	0	—	41
49	Vladimir Chepelin (BLR)	—	—	0	2	6	12	18	0	38
50	Sean Doherty (USA)	0	6	—	—	DNS	21	0	9	36
51	Alexey Volkov (RUS)	—	—	25	—	—	—	—	10	35
52	Alexander Povarnitsyn (RUS)	—	—	—	—	—	31	—	—	31
53	Kalev Ermits (EST)	—	0	—	—	—	30	—	—	30
54	Aliaksandr Darozhka (BLR)	—	—	13	—	—	—	0	17	30
55	Yan Savitskiy (KAZ)	0	—	—	—		5	22	DNS	27
56	Vitaliy Kilchytskyy (UKR)	—	—	—	12	2	—	—	13	27
57	Jaroslav Soukup (CZE)	0	1	7	—	3	—	0	15	26
58	Tomáš Hasilla (SVK)	19	—	—	—	—	—	—	DNF	19
59	Alexander Os (NOR)	—	—	—	9	—	10	—	—	19
60	Mario Dolder (SUI)	—	—	—	—	—	17	—	—	17
61	Daniel Böhm (GER)	9	0	—	4	—	4	—	—	17
62	Tomáš Krupčík (CZE)	0	—	—	0	16	—	—	—	16
63	Martin Otčenáš (SVK)	0	5	0	0	—	—	11	—	16
64	Jesper Nelin (SWE)	0	—	—	—	—	—	3	12	15
65	Christian de Lorenzi (ITA)	7	8	—	—	0	0	0	—	15
66	Macx Davies (CAN)	11	—	0	0	—	—	0	—	11
67	Anton Sinapov (BUL)	0	—	—	—	—	DNS	—	11	11
68	Antonin Guigonnat (FRA)	—	—	—	10	0	—	—	—	10
69	Matvey Eliseev (RUS)	—	—	—	3	—	—	—	6	9
70	Timofey Lapshin (RUS)	8	0	—	—	—	—	—	—	8
71	Dmytro Rusinov (UKR)	—	—	—	—	—	8	—	—	8
72	Vladimir Semakov (UKR)	1	—	0	—	—	—	—	7	8
73	Yuryi Liadov (BLR)	—	—	—	—	—	7	—	—	7
74	Roland Lessing (EST)	—	—	—	—	—	—	6	—	6
75	Thomas Bormolini (ITA)	—	—	—	0	—	1	4	—	5
76	Dmitriy Dyuzhev (BLR)	—	0	0	—	0	—	—	3	3
77	Torstein Stenersen (SWE)	—	—	—	0	—	—	—	2	2
78	Christian Gow (CAN)	—	2	DNF	0	—	—	—	—	2
79	Rene Zahkna (EST)	—	—	—	—	1	—	—	—	1
80	Petr Pashchenko (RUS)	—	—	—	—	—	—	—	1	1
