= 2015–16 Biathlon World Cup – Pursuit Women =

The 2015–16 Biathlon World Cup – Pursuit Women started on Thursday December 3, 2015 in Östersund and finished on March 19, 2016, in Khanty-Mansiysk. The defending titlist Kaisa Mäkäräinen of Finland finished on the 4th place. Gabriela Soukalová of the Czech Republic won the title.

== Competition format ==
The 10 kilometres (6.2 mi) pursuit race is skied over five laps. The biathlete shoots four times at any shooting lane, in the order of prone, prone, standing, standing, totalling 20 targets. For each missed target a biathlete has to run a penalty loop. Competitors' starts are staggered, according to the result of the previous sprint race.

== 2014–15 Top 3 Standings ==
Medal	Athlete	Points
Gold:	(Finland) Kaisa Mäkäräinen	348
Silver:	(Belarus) Darya Domracheva	347
Bronze:	(Ukraine) Valj Semerenko	255

== Medal winners ==
Event:	Gold:	Time	Silver:	Time	Bronze:	Time
Östersund details	Kaisa Mäkäräinen; Finland	30:45.1 (1+0+1+0)	Dorothea Wierer; Italy	30:47.0 (0+0+1+0)	Franziska Hildebrand; Germany	30:48.4 (0+0+0+0)
Hochfilzen details	Laura Dahlmeier; Germany	28:23.3 (0+0+0+1)	Maren Hammerschmidt; Germany	28:36.6 (0+0+1+1)	Gabriela Soukalová; Czech Republic	28:41.8 (0+0+0+1)
Pokljuka details	Laura Dahlmeier; Germany	30:08.9 (0+0+0+0)	Marie Dorin Habert; France	30:26.9 (0+0+0+0)	Kaisa Mäkäräinen; Finland	31:04.1 (0+0+0+1)
Ruhpolding details	Laura Dahlmeier; Germany	32:35.9 (0+0+1+0)	Gabriela Soukalová; Czech Republic	32:43.2 (0+0+0+1)	Dorothea Wierer; Italy	33:29.5 (0+1+0+1)
Antholz-Anterselva details	Ekaterina Yurlova; Russia	30:07.3 (1+0+0+0)	Selina Gasparin; Switzerland	30:19.3 (1+0+0+0)	Dorothea Wierer; Italy	30:25.3 (0+0+2+1)
Presque Isle details	Gabriela Soukalová; Czech Republic	31:24.6 (0+0+3+0)	Kaisa Mäkäräinen; Finland	31:58.6 (0+1+2+0)	Marie Dorin Habert; France	32:03.4 (1+0+4+0)
World Championships details	Laura Dahlmeier; Germany	30:49.2 (0+0+0+0)	Dorothea Wierer; Italy	31:37.5 (0+1+1+0)	Marie Dorin Habert; France	31:46.5 (0+0+2+1)
Khanty-Mansiysk details	Kaisa Mäkäräinen; Finland	30:06.7 (1+0+1+0)	Marie Dorin Habert; France	30:08.2 (0+0+0+1)	Dorothea Wierer; Italy	30:12.4 (0+0+1+0)

== Standings ==
#	Name	ÖST	HOC	POK	RUH	ANT	PRE	WCH	KHA	Total
1	Gabriela Soukalová (CZE)	40	48	43	54	36	60	30	43	354
2	Dorothea Wierer (ITA)	54	34	30	48	48	32	54	48	348
3	Marie Dorin-Habert (FRA)	43	29	54	40	15	48	48	54	331
4	Kaisa Mäkäräinen (FIN)	60	18	48	28	20	54	36	60	324
5	Laura Dahlmeier (GER)	–	60	60	60	–	–	60	25	265
6	Franziska Hildebrand (GER)	48	43	29	32	14	–	43	28	237
7	Olena Pidhrushna (UKR)	31	23	–	31	27	36	40	36	224
8	Veronika Vítková (CZE)	34	11	36	36	28	38	34	DNF	217
9	Franziska Preuß (GER)	38	30	40	–	–	27	38	40	213
10	Tiril Eckhoff (NOR)	32	40	7	43	43	–	24	–	189
11	Ekaterina Yurlova (RUS)	–	27	6	20	60	31	20	23	187
12	Susan Dunklee (USA)	–	10	31	26	24	40	31	19	181
13	Juliya Dzhyma (UKR)	13	38	19	34	DNS	0	32	32	168
14	Karin Oberhofer (ITA)	26	0	28	25	38	21	10	20	168
15	Anaïs Bescond (FRA)	–	25	15	8	31	23	29	30	161
16	Lisa Theresa Hauser (AUT)	12	28	1	29	10	29	21	29	159
17	Krystyna Guzik (POL)	17	21	–	11	40	43	DNS	22	144
18	Olga Podchufarova (RUS)	14	36	27	30	34	DNS	–	–	141
19	Marte Olsbu (NOR)	36	–	12	22	12	–	25	34	141
20	Magdalena Gwizdoń (POL)	27	16	23	15	13	26	11	9	140
21	Justine Braisaz (FRA)	28	–	9	0	26	10	19	31	123
22	Nadezhda Skardino (BLR)	15	31	22	DNS	23	—	0	26	117
23	Maren Hammerschmidt (GER)	9	54	25	0	—	—	—	24	112
24	Selina Gasparin (SUI)	2	9	–	4	54	15	—	21	105
25	Fanny Horn Birkeland (NOR)	7	32	–	6	0	–	22	38	105
26	Lucie Charvatová (CZE)	–	19	26	21	0	16	23	0	105
27	Eva Puskarčíková (CZE)	19	1	32	23	18	4	–	–	97
28	Paulína Fialková (SVK)	21	–	16	38	—	—	18	0	93
29	Vanessa Hinz (GER)	29	12	38	12	—	—	—	0	91
30	Anaïs Chevalier (FRA)	–	–	0	–	30	20	26	10	86
31	Mona Brorsson (SWE)	10	0	0	13	16	24	2	17	82
32	Daria Virolaynen (RUS)	–	3	21	19	29	DNS	4	5	81
33	Miriam Gössner (GER)	30	26	0	3	21	0	—	0	80
34	Monika Hojnisz (POL)	1	0	24	10	25	–	12	8	80
35	Olga Abramova (UKR)	24	17	13	16	9	—	—	–	79
36	Tatiana Akimova (RUS)	–	–	–	0	6	22	15	27	70
37	Valj Semerenko (UKR)	–	–	11	24	32	–	–	–	67
38	Ekaterina Shumilova (RUS)	11	22	–	7	–	25	–	2	67
39	Synnøve Solemdal (NOR)	23	8	18	1	–	–	17	0	67
40	Lisa Vittozzi (ITA)	0	DNS	–	–	7	12	28	15	62
41	Iryna Varvynets (UKR)	–	–	17	–	DNS	14	27	0	58
42	Teja Gregorin (SLO)	0	14	20	–	0	5	0	16	55
43	Jana Gereková (SVK)	20	4	–	27	0	DNS	0	–	51
44	Elisabeth Högberg (SWE)	25	24	–	–	0	–	–	–	49
45	Kaia Wøien Nicolaisen (NOR)	–	–	–	–	DNS	34	–	14	48
46	Fuyuko Tachizaki (JPN)	–	13	2	18	–	9	0	0	42
47	Célia Aymonier (FRA)	–	0	0	–	11	30	–	0	41
48	Rosanna Crawford (CAN)	18	6	0	–	0	–	14	–	38
49	Natalya Burdyga (UKR)	–	20	4	0	0	13	–	–	37
50	Hilde Fenne (NOR)	–	2	34	–	–	–	–	–	36
51	Galina Vishnevskaya (KAZ)	0	–	–	–	0	19	16	DNS	35
52	Iryna Kryuko (BLR)	–	–	10	0	0	7	–	18	35
53	Baiba Bendika (LAT)	–	0	–	–	0	28	–	6	34
54	Julia Ransom (CAN)	5	0	0	0	22	–	0	7	34
55	Linn Persson (SWE)	3	–	0	5	19	–	1	–	28
56	Dunja Zdouc (AUT)	–	–	–	–	–	11	13	–	24
57	Éva Tófalvi (ROU)	22	DNS	0	–	0	–	0	–	22
58	Mari Laukkanen (FIN)	–	0	5	17	–	–	0	–	22
59	Hannah Dreissigacker (USA)	–	–	–	–	–	17	5	–	22
60	Karolin Horchler (GER)	4	–	–	–	17	0	–	–	21
61	Anastasia Zagoruiko (RUS)	–	–	–	–	8	–	–	13	21
62	Clare Egan (USA)	0	–	–	–	–	18	–	–	18
63	Ingela Andersson (SWE)	–	–	–	–	3	3	9	3	18
64	Yan Zhang (CHN)	0	–	8	9	–	–	0	–	17
65	Megan Tandy (CAN)	16	0	–	–	–	–	–	–	16
66	Weronika Nowakowska (POL)	0	15	–	0	–	DNS	–	–	15
67	Darya Yurkevich (BLR)	0	0	0	14	–	–	–	1	15
68	Federica Sanfilippo (UKR)	0	–	14	0	–	DNS	0	–	14
69	Darya Usanova (KAZ)	8	–	–	–	0	–	6	DNS	14
70	Nadine Horchler (GER)	–	–	–	–	–	–	–	12	12
71	Nastassia Dubarezava (BLR)	–	–	–	0	–	0	0	11	11
72	Lena Häcki (SUI)	0	0	3	0	–	–	8	0	11
73	Coline Varcin (FRA)	6	–	–	–	4	–	–	–	10
74	Aita Gasparin (SUI)	0	–	0	0	1	8	–	0	9
75	Tang Jialin (CHN)	0	–	–	0	–	–	7	–	7
76	Marine Bolliet (FRA)	–	7	–	–	–	–	–	–	7
77	Luise Kummer (GER)	–	–	–	–	–	6	–	–	6
78	Nadiia Bielkina (UKR)	0	5	–	–	–	–	–	–	5
79	Desislava Stoyanova (BUL)	–	DNS	–	–	5	DNS	0	–	5
80	Ingrid Landmark Tandrevold (NOR)	–	–	–	–	–	–	–	4	4
81	Emilia Yordanova (BUL)	–	–	–	–	–	–	3	–	3
82	Irene Cadurisch (SUI)	–	–	–	–	2	–	0	–	2
83	Andreja Mali (SLO)	–	–	–	–	–	2	0	–	2
84	Alexia Runggaldier (ITA)	–	–	–	2	–	–	–	–	2
85	Iana Bondar (UKR)	–	–	–	–	–	1	–	0	1
