= 2015–16 Biathlon World Cup – Nation Men =

== 2014–15 Top 3 standings ==
Medal	Nation	Points
Gold:	Norway	8096.5
Silver:	Germany	8001.5
Bronze:	France	7812.5

== Standings ==
#	Name	ÖST SR	ÖST MR	ÖST IN	ÖST SP	HOC SP	HOC RL	POK SP	RUH SP	RUH IN	RUH RL	ANT SP	ANT RL	CAN SP	CAN SR	CAN MR	PRE SP	PRE RL	OSL MR	OSL SP	OSL IN	OSL RL	KHA SP	Total
1	Norway	210	210	435	422	406	390	416	462	387	420	400	360	336	180	180	425	420	180	421	386	420	342	7808
2	Germany	180	195	385	421	414	310	414	362	384	310	422	390	407	135	210	404	360	195	392	396	390	442	7518
3	Russia	155	145	396	346	421	420	429	328	426	390	421	420	406	165	125	365	330	135	355	363	290	347	7178
4	France	55	165	407	423	408	360	404	375	366	330	387	310	398	210	155	359	390	210	414	413	230	344	7113
5	Austria	105	100	398	357	394	330	292	414	390	360	385	330	421	195	95	355	230	155	351	402	330	406	6795
6	United States	85	110	345	289	356	250	342	231	352	290	331	290	350	80	165	375	310	110	362	347	250	368	5988
7	Ukraine	135	105	343	340	321	230	277	366	335	200	352	200	363	145	105	341	270	165	380	320	160	378	5831
8	Czech Republic	95	180	307	348	293	160	340	391	382	250	335	250	323	95	110	311	—	145	325	379	310	359	5688
9	Italy	115	50	273	238	330	220	310	265	340	270	376	160	363	155	195	325	290	125	325	281	210	255	5471
10	Canada	195	115	257	349	337	290	330	327	308	220	251	210	333	100	145	213	170	105	295	317	360	232	5459
11	Belarus	65	135	307	285	231	190	327	314	260	140	289	190	354	65	100	306	250	115	304	270	170	341	5008
12	Switzerland	45	90	293	266	273	210	291	302	205	210	271	230	289	85	135	395	190	90	313	247	220	294	4944
13	Sweden	165	155	315	282	283	270	281	261	341	190	218	150	237	115	115	253	—	100	301	303	270	329	4934
14	Bulgaria	70	65	238	336	257	200	275	303	299	230	317	170	—	—	—	274	210	80	330	364	190	318	4526
15	Slovakia	75	80	243	333	259	170	243	251	299	170	260	270	267	55	65	281	200	75	279	211	200	238	4524
16	Slovenia	60	125	273	264	253	150	321	185	239	160	274	180	234	70	75	294	—	95	263	344	150	62	4071
17	Kazakhstan	80	85	211	207	176	180	156	207	231	150	244	140	217	105	85	280	220	85	234	297	120	254	3964
18	Estonia	35	70	237	129	232	140	223	195	238	180	210	220	189	—	70	263	—	55	285	267	180	207	3625
19	Romania	100	75	180	194	278	130	213	221	161	130	180	120	216	75	60	223	180	50	245	156	140	224	3551
20	Lithuania	50	—	267	152	159	70	137	172	169	110	178	110	124	45	50	126	—	45	198	207	90	211	2670
21	Finland	145	55	80	194	145	90	48	120	125	120	101	130	184	60	90	218	—	70	186	175	130	165	2631
22	Poland	90	95	209	115	185	120	185	175	252	90	145	—	155	90	—	150	—	60	205	194	110	—	2625
23	Latvia	125	—	87	150	131	100	200	197	158	100	139	100	125	125	—	136	—	35	177	162	70	266	2583
24	Japan	110	60	56	110	120	110	78	103	141	70	44	90	147	110	80	142	—	65	215	208	100	141	2300
25	South Korea	30	45	19	39	7	50	25	51	39	80	11	80	47	50	55	53	160	40	86	76	—	79	1122
26	United Kingdom	40	—	52	48	64	60	59	36	91	—	22	70	94	—	—	—	—	—	80	68	—	53	837
27	Belgium	—	—	21	—	79	—	29	—	—	—	78	—	—	—	—	—	—	—	114	149	80	—	550
28	Serbia	—	—	39	—	11	80	19	—	—	—	—	—	—	—	—	—	—	—	40	60	—	—	249
29	Croatia	—	—	—	—	—	—	—	33	—	—	—	—	—	—	—	—	—	—	80	—	—	—	113
30	Greece	—	—	—	—	—	—	—	—	—	—	—	—	—	—	—	—	—	—	33	62	—	—	95
#	Name	ÖST SR	ÖST MR	ÖST IN	ÖST SP	HOC SP	HOC RL	POK SP	RUH SP	RUH IN	RUH RL	ANT SP	ANT RL	CAN SP	CAN SR	CAN MR	PRE SP	PRE RL	OSL MR	OSL SP	OSL IN	OSL RL	KHA SP	Total
31	Turkey	—	—	—	—	—	—	—	—	—	—	—	—	—	—	—	—	—	—	46	29	—	—	75
32	Hungary	—	—	—	—	—	—	—	—	—	—	—	—	—	—	—	—	—	—	29	27	—	—	56
33	Australia	—	—	—	—	5	—	23	—	—	—	—	—	—	—	—	—	—	—	—	—	—	—	28
