= 2015–16 Biathlon World Cup – Nation Women =

== 2014–15 Top 3 standings ==
Medal	Nation	Points
Gold:	Germany	7853.5
Silver:	Czech Republic	7646.5
Bronze:	France	7400.5

== Standings ==
#	Name	ÖST SR	ÖST MR	ÖST IN	ÖST SP	HOC SP	HOC RL	POK SP	RUH SP	RUH IN	RUH RL	ANT SP	ANT RL	CAN SP	CAN SR	CAN MR	PRE SP	PRE RL	OSL MR	OSL SP	OSL IN	OSL RL	KHA SP	Total
1	Germany	180	195	361	399	462	390	438	431	394	390	344	220	397	135	210	345	360	195	406	400	360	394	7406
2	France	55	165	401	369	390	310	380	376	363	270	408	420	361	210	155	407	290	210	399	439	390	408	7176
3	Czech Republic	95	180	385	385	391	290	412	407	367	290	380	390	369	95	110	413	420	145	387	379	290	364	6944
4	Italy	115	50	348	409	361	420	366	348	400	360	401	330	391	155	195	355	310	125	366	380	270	367	6822
5	Ukraine	135	105	396	412	391	360	345	372	352	420	386	230	380	145	105	350	390	165	363	348	310	343	6803
6	Russia	155	145	322	261	363	230	332	389	364	330	417	360	367	165	125	358	270	135	338	352	210	373	6361
7	Norway	210	210	356	363	341	250	332	351	357	310	352	310	239	180	180	291	—	180	397	307	420	388	6324
8	Poland	90	95	371	342	328	330	391	345	345	250	372	210	420	90	—	361	330	60	264	366	330	331	6021
9	Sweden	165	155	301	302	269	210	264	286	300	210	325	290	255	115	115	322	250	100	364	326	220	271	5415
10	Belarus	65	135	386	338	326	270	319	334	341	190	272	270	230	65	100	330	190	115	302	313	140	359	5390
11	Canada	195	115	291	342	274	220	318	243	254	230	278	190	310	100	145	233	150	105	273	335	170	158	4929
12	Switzerland	45	90	300	283	279	200	229	279	322	180	358	200	266	85	135	301	200	90	289	276	160	324	4891
13	Kazakhstan	80	85	323	288	215	180	180	221	305	200	255	250	326	105	85	322	210	85	304	276	250	287	4832
14	United States	85	110	211	318	219	170	268	295	227	160	245	150	313	80	165	377	220	110	335	306	190	194	4748
15	Austria	105	100	268	221	288	150	238	246	165	140	274	170	318	195	95	289	230	155	312	308	200	206	4673
16	Slovakia	75	80	303	300	229	190	300	318	315	220	259	—	258	55	65	207	—	75	301	230	180	254	4214
17	Finland	145	55	197	260	241	140	279	306	226	—	282	—	199	60	90	277	—	70	254	245	150	240	3716
18	Slovenia	60	125	249	214	214	160	166	104	119	130	238	—	271	70	75	285	—	95	280	279	230	209	3573
19	Romania	100	75	110	220	187	120	164	176	205	150	204	130	127	75	60	202	180	50	188	157	110	214	3204
20	Bulgaria	70	65	177	159	188	130	167	166	206	100	241	180	—	—	—	227	160	80	208	235	120	133	3012
21	Japan	110	60	147	103	146	—	136	259	219	—	166	—	298	110	80	206	—	65	212	276	130	253	2976
22	Lithuania	50	—	127	146	128	110	127	198	191	120	192	160	189	45	50	199	170	45	158	165	—	126	2696
23	Estonia	35	70	247	169	126	100	173	123	178	110	150	140	153	—	70	161	—	55	189	95	—	—	2344
24	China	—	—	165	191	107	—	177	171	219	170	—	—	—	—	—	—	—	—	287	256	100	—	1843
25	South Korea	30	45	68	78	80	—	124	90	82	—	113	—	132	50	55	121	—	40	133	110	90	169	1610
26	Latvia	125	—	35	80	98	—	41	78	96	—	92	—	140	125	—	126	—	35	94	125	—	104	1394
27	United Kingdom	40	—	68	25	41	—	68	—	51	—	31	—	—	—	—	—	—	—	59	93	—	—	476
28	Spain	—	—	—	—	—	—	—	35	—	—	39	—	—	—	—	—	—	—	41	57	—	—	172
29	Hungary	—	—	—	—	21	—	29	—	—	—	—	—	—	—	—	—	—	—	71	45	—	—	166
30	Bosnia and Herzegovina	—	—	27	—	13	—	59	—	—	—	—	—	—	—	—	—	—	—	—	—	—	—	99
