= 2015–16 Biathlon World Cup – Relay Men =

The 2015–16 Biathlon World Cup – Relay Men started on Sunday November 29, 2015 in Hochfilzen and will finish on March 12, 2016 at the Biathlon World Championships 2016 in Oslo.

== Competition format ==
The relay teams consist of four biathletes. Every athlete leg skied over three laps of 2.5 km, with two shooting rounds; one prone, one standing. For every round of five targets there are eight bullets available, though the last three can only be single-loaded manually one at a time from spare round holders or bullets deposited by the competitor into trays or onto the mat at the firing line. If after eight bullets there are still misses, one 150 m penalty loop must be taken for each missed target remaining. The first-leg participants start all at the same time, and as in cross-country skiing relays, every athlete of a team must touch the team's next-leg participant to perform a valid changeover. On the first shooting stage of the first leg, the participant must shoot in the lane corresponding to their bib number (Bib #10 shoots at lane #10 regardless of position in race.), then for the remainder of the relay, the relay team shoots at the lane in the position they arrived (Arrive at the range in 5th place, you shoot at lane five.).

== 2014–15 Top 3 Standings ==
Medal	Athlete	Points
Gold:	Russia	311
Silver:	Norway	308
Bronze:	Germany	305

== Medal winners ==
Event:	Gold:	Time	Silver:	Time	Bronze:	Time
Hochfilzen details	Russia; Alexey Volkov; Evgeniy Garanichev; Dmitry Malyshko; Anton Shipulin	1:11:40.8 (0+0) (0+1) (0+0) (0+0) (0+2) (0+1) (0+0) (0+2)	Norway; Henrik L'Abée-Lund; Johannes Thingnes Bø; Tarjei Bø; Emil Hegle Svendsen	1:11:43.9 (0+0) (0+2) (0+0) (0+2) (0+0) (0+1) (0+0) (0+2)	France; Simon Fourcade; Quentin Fillon Maillet; Simon Desthieux; Martin Fourcade	1:12:42.7 (0+1) (0+0) (0+0) (0+3) (0+0) (0+1) (0+1) (0+0)
Ruhpolding details	Norway; Ole Einar Bjørndalen; Johannes Thingnes Bø; Tarjei Bø; Emil Hegle Svendsen	1:17:05.0 (0+3) (0+2) (0+0) (0+0) (0+3) (0+1) (0+1) (0+2)	Russia; Alexey Volkov; Evgeniy Garanichev; Maxim Tsvetkov; Anton Shipulin	1:17:19.6 (0+0) (0+1) (0+0) (0+2) (0+1) (0+2) (0+0) (0+0)	Austria; Sven Grossegger; Julian Eberhard; Simon Eder; Dominik Landertinger	1:17:40.8 (0+0) (0+2) (1+3) (0+0) (0+0) (0+0) (0+0) (0+2)
Antholz-Anterselva details	Russia; Maxim Tsvetkov; Evgeniy Garanichev; Dmitry Malyshko; Anton Shipulin	1:12:42.8 (0+1) (0+1) (0+0) (0+1) (0+3) (0+0) (0+1) (0+0)	Germany; Erik Lesser; Benedikt Doll; Arnd Peiffer; Simon Schempp	1:12:43.8 (0+0) (0+0) (0+0) (1+3) (0+1) (0+0) (0+0) (0+0)	Norway; Ole Einar Bjørndalen; Lars Helge Birkeland; Johannes Thingnes Bø; Erlend Bjøntegaard	1:13:05.7 (0+2) (0+1) (0+0) (0+0) (0+0) (0+0) (0+2) (0+2)
Presque Isle details	Norway; Lars Helge Birkeland; Erlend Bjøntegaard; Johannes Thingnes Bø; Tarjei Bø	1:12:09.8 (0+3) (0+0) (0+0) (0+0) (0+2) (0+1) (0+0) (0+1)	France; Simon Fourcade; Quentin Fillon Maillet; Simon Desthieux; Jean-Guillaume Béatrix	1:12:39.9 (0+0) (0+1) (0+1) (0+0) (0+0) (0+0) (0+0) (0+0)	Germany; Erik Lesser; Andreas Birnbacher; Daniel Böhm; Benedikt Doll	1:12:52.4 (0+0) (0+0) (0+3) (0+2) (0+3) (0+1) (0+1) (0+1)
World Championships details	Norway; Ole Einar Bjørndalen; Tarjei Bø; Johannes Thingnes Bø; Emil Hegle Svendsen	1:13:16.8 (0+0) (0+2) (0+1) (0+1) (0+0) (0+0) (0+0) (0+2)	Germany; Erik Lesser; Benedikt Doll; Arnd Peiffer; Simon Schempp	1:13:28.3 (0+0) (0+0) (0+1) (0+1) (0+1) (0+1) (0+0) (0+1)	Canada; Christian Gow; Nathan Smith; Scott Gow; Brendan Green	1:13:40.2 (0+0) (0+0) (0+1) (0+1) (0+0) (0+3) (0+0) (0+0)

== Standings ==
#	Name	HOC	RUH	ANT	PRE	WCH	Total
1.	Norway	54	60	48	60	60	282
2	Russia	60	54	60	43	38	255
3	Germany	40	40	54	48	54	236
4	France	48	43	40	54	32	217
5	Austria	43	48	43	32	43	209
6	United States	34	38	38	40	34	184
7	Canada	38	31	30	26	48	173
8	Italy	31	36	25	38	30	160
9	Ukraine	32	29	29	36	25	151
10	Switzerland	30	30	32	28	31	151
11	Slovakia	26	26	36	29	29	146
12	Bulgaria	29	32	26	30	28	145
13	Belarus	28	23	28	34	26	139
14	Czech Republic	25	34	34	—	40	133
15	Kazakhstan	27	24	23	31	21	126
16	Sweden	36	28	24	DNS	36	124
17	Romania	22	22	21	27	23	115
18	Estonia	23	27	31	—	27	108
19	Slovenia	24	25	27	—	24	100
20	Finland	18	21	22	—	22	83
21	Lithuania	16	20	20	—	18	74
22	South Korea	14	17	17	25	—	73
23	Japan	20	16	18	—	19	73
24	Latvia	19	19	18	—	16	72
25	Poland	21	18	—	—	20	59
26	United Kingdom	15	—	16	—	—	31
27	Serbia	17	—	—	—	—	17
27	Belgium	—	—	—	—	17	17
