= 2015–16 Biathlon World Cup – Mass start Women =

The 2015–16 Biathlon World Cup – Mass start Women started on Sunday December 20, 2015 in Pokljuka and will finish on Sunday March 20, 2016 in Khanty-Mansiysk. The defending titlist is Franziska Preuß of Germany.

== Competition format ==
World Cup Mass starts are held with only the 30 top ranking athletes on the start line. All biathletes start at the same time and the first across the finish line wins. The distance of 12.5 kilometres (7.8 mi) is skied over five laps; there are four bouts of shooting (two prone, two standing, in that order) with the first shooting bout being at the lane corresponding to the competitor's bib number (Bib #10 shoots at lane #10 regardless of position in race), with the rest of the shooting bouts being on a first-come, first-served basis (If a competitor arrives at the lane in fifth place, they shoot at lane 5). As in sprint and pursuit, competitors must ski one 150 metres (490 ft) penalty loop for each miss.

== 2014-15 Top 3 Standings ==
Medal	Athlete	Points
Gold:	(Germany) Franziska Preuß	218
Silver:	(Ukraine) Valj Semerenko	210
Bronze:	(Belarus) Darya Domracheva	206

== Medal winners ==
Event:	Gold:	Time	Silver:	Time	Bronze:	Time
Pokljuka details	Kaisa Mäkäräinen; Finland	34:40.2 (1+0+0+0)	Gabriela Soukalová; Czech Republic	34:52.0 (0+0+0+0)	Olga Podchufarova; Russia	35:07.9 (0+0+0+0)
Ruhpolding details	Laura Dahlmeier; Germany	33:17.7 (0+0+0+0)	Marie Dorin Habert; France	33:33.0 (1+0+0+0)	Tiril Eckhoff; Norway	33:39.6 (0+0+1+1)
Ruhpolding details	Gabriela Soukalová; Czech Republic	41:13.2 (0+0+0+0)	Franziska Hildebrand; Germany	41:27.1 (0+0+0+1)	Laura Dahlmeier; Germany	41:37.6 (0+1+0+1)
Canmore details	Dorothea Wierer; Italy	36:50.0 (1+0+0+0)	Marie Dorin Habert; France	37:10.8 (0+0+0+1)	Gabriela Soukalová; Czech Republic	37:40.3 (0+0+0+1)
Holmenkollen details	Marie Dorin Habert; France	35:28.5 (0+0+0+0)	Laura Dahlmeier; Germany	35:35.8 (0+0+1+0)	Kaisa Mäkäräinen; Finland	35:36.6 (0+0+1+0)
Khanty-Mansiysk	Cancelled					

== Standings ==
#	Name	POK	RU1	RU2	CAN	WCH	KHA	Total
1	Gabriela Soukalová (CZE)	54	36	60	48	43	—	241
2	Marie Dorin Habert (FRA)	36	54	32	54	60	—	236
3	Laura Dahlmeier (GER)	30	60	48	36	54	—	228
4	Kaisa Mäkäräinen (FIN)	60	28	—	43	48	—	179
5	Franziska Hildebrand (GER)	24	24	54	40	27	—	169
6	Anaïs Bescond (FRA)	22	43	21	38	40	—	164
7	Olena Pidhrushna (UKR)	38	40	26	31	23	—	158
8	Dorothea Wierer (ITA)	21	12	34	60	21	—	148
9	Veronika Vítková (CZE)	43	32	6	23	38	—	142
10	Tiril Eckhoff (NOR)	29	48	43	—	14	—	134
11	Nadezhda Skardino (BLR)	40	20	38	—	31	—	129
12	Susan Dunklee (USA)	18	38	18	2	30	—	106
13	Krystyna Guzik (POL)	20	18	30	14	22	—	104
14	Juliya Dzhyma (UKR)	23	30	36	—	12	—	101
15	Olga Podchufarova (RUS)	48	23	29	—	—	—	100
16	Eva Puskarčíková (CZE)	28	25	16	29	—	—	98
17	Lisa Theresa Hauser (AUT)	34	16	DNF	27	20	—	97
18	Franziska Preuß (GER)	31	—	—	30	34	—	95
19	Magdalena Gwizdon (POL)	8	34	27	10	16	—	95
20	Karin Oberhofer (ITA)	14	26	31	21	—	—	92
21	Monika Hojnisz (POL)	26	29	20	6	—	—	81
22	Vanessa Hinz (GER)	32	22	24	—	—	—	78
23	Miriam Gössner (GER)	2	14	25	34	—	—	75
24	Maren Hammerschmidt (GER)	27	2	40	—	—	—	69
25	Marte Olsbu (NOR)	—	—	—	28	36	—	64
26	Fuyuko Tachizaki (JPN)	—	31	—	20	—	—	51
27	Ekaterina Yurlova (RUS)	—	—	—	22	28	—	50
28	Iryna Varvynets (UKR)	—	—	—	24	25	—	49
29	Daria Virolaynen (RUS)	10	6	—	32	—	—	48
30	Rosanna Crawford (CAN)	—	—	22	—	26	—	48
31	Justine Braisaz (FRA)	—	—	—	12	29	—	41
32	Olga Abramova (UKR)	16	10	14	—	—	—	40
33	Paulina Fialková (SVK)	—	27	12	—	—	—	39
34	Fanny Horn Birkeland (NOR)	—	—	—	—	32	—	32
35	Selina Gasparin (SUI)	—	—	28	4	—	—	32
36	Célia Aymonier (FRA)	—	—	—	26	—	—	26
37	Galina Vishnevskaya (KAZ)	—	—	8	—	18	—	26
38	Luise Kummer (GER)	—	—	—	25	—	—	25
38	Hilde Fenne (NOR)	25	—	—	—	—	—	25
40	Lisa Vittozzi (ITA)	—	—	—	—	24	—	24
41	Synnøve Solemdal (NOR)	—	—	23	—	—	—	23
42	Mari Laukkanen (FIN)	—	21	—	—	—	—	21
43	Federica Sanfilippo (ITA)	12	—	DNS	8	—	—	20
44	Baiba Bendika (LAT)	—	—	—	18	—	—	18
45	Karolin Horchler (GER)	—	—	—	16	—	—	16
46	Valj Semerenko (UKR)	4	—	—	—	10	—	14
47	Lucie Charvátová (CZE)	6	8	—	—	—	—	14
48	Darya Yurkevich (BLR)	—	—	10	—	—	—	10
49	Hannah Dreissigacker (USA)	—	—	—	—	8	—	8
50	Mona Brorsson (SWE)	—	—	—	—	6	—	6
51	Jana Gerekova (SVK)	—	4	—	—	—	—	4
51	Ingela Andersson (SWE)	—	—	—	—	4	—	4
53	Anaïs Chevalier (FRA)	—	—	—	—	2	—	2
