= 2015–16 Biathlon World Cup – Relay Women =

The 2015–16 Biathlon World Cup – Relay Women started on Sunday December 13, 2015 in Hochfilzen and will finish on March 12, 2016 aبt the Biathlon World Championships 2016 in Oslo.

== Competition format ==
The relay teams consist of four biathletes. Every athlete leg skied over three laps of 2 km, with two shooting rounds; one prone, one standing. For every round of five targets there are eight bullets available, though the last three can only be single-loaded manually one at a time from spare round holders or bullets deposited by the competitor into trays or onto the mat at the firing line. If after eight bullets there are still misses, one 150 m penalty loop must be taken for each missed target remaining. The first-leg participants start all at the same time, and as in cross-country skiing relays, every athlete of a team must touch the team's next-leg participant to perform a valid changeover. On the first shooting stage of the first leg, the participant must shoot in the lane corresponding to their bib number (Bib #10 shoots at lane #10 regardless of position in race.), then for the remainder of the relay, the relay team shoots at the lane in the position they arrived (Arrive at the range in 5th place, you shoot at lane five.).

== 2014–15 Top 3 Standings ==
Medal	Athlete	Points
Gold:	Czech Republic	316
Silver:	Germany	302
Bronze:	France	266

== Medal winners ==
Event:	Gold:	Time	Silver:	Time	Bronze:	Time
Hochfilzen details	Italy; Lisa Vittozzi; Karin Oberhofer; Federica Sanfilippo; Dorothea Wierer	1:05:32.6 (0+0) (0+0) (0+0) (0+1) (0+3) (0+2) (0+1) (0+1)	Germany; Franziska Hildebrand; Maren Hammerschmidt; Vanessa Hinz; Franziska Preuß	1:05:32.8 (0+0) (0+2) (0+1) (0+1) (0+0) (0+1) (0+1) (0+1)	Ukraine; Julija Dzhyma; Olga Abramova; Valj Semerenko; Olena Pidhrushna	1:05:45.7 (0+1) (0+0) (0+1) (0+2) (0+2) (0+1) (0+2) (0+1)
Ruhpolding details	Ukraine; Iryna Varvynets; Julija Dzhyma; Valj Semerenko; Olena Pidhrushna	1:16:14.2 (0+0) (0+0) (0+0) (0+0) (1+3) (0+1) (0+0) (0+0)	Germany; Karolin Horchler; Miriam Gössner; Maren Hammerschmidt; Laura Dahlmeier	1:16:15.4 (0+1) (0+1) (2+3) (0+2) (0+2) (0+1) (0+0) (0+1)	Italy; Lisa Vittozzi; Karin Oberhofer; Alexia Runggaldier; Dorothea Wierer	1:16:58.0 (0+1) (0+2) (0+0) (0+3) (0+1) (0+2) (0+0) (0+1)
Antholz-Anterselva details	France; Justine Braisaz; Anaïs Bescond; Anaïs Chevalier; Marie Dorin-Habert	1:07:53.5 (0+2) (0+1) (0+1) (0+3) (0+0) (0+1) (0+0) (0+0)	Czech Republic; Eva Puskarčíková; Lucie Charvátová; Gabriela Soukalová; Veronika Vítková	1:08:10.7 (0+0) (0+1) (0+0) (2+3) (0+1) (0+0) (0+2) (0+0)	Russia; Ekaterina Shumilova; Anastasia Zagoruiko; Ekaterina Yurlova; Olga Podchufarova	1:08:14.6 (0+1) (0+2) (0+2) (0+2) (0+2) (0+0) (0+0) (0+1)
Presque Isle details	Czech Republic; Eva Puskarčíková; Lucie Charvátová; Gabriela Soukalová; Veronika Vítková	1:07:11.0 (0+2) (0+0) (0+2) (1+3) (0+0) (0+2) (0+2) (0+3)	Ukraine; Iryna Varvynets; Natalya Burdyga; Julija Dzhyma; Olena Pidhrushna	1:07:36.2 (0+1) (0+1) (0+3) (0+1) (0+1) (0+0) (0+2) (0+3)	Germany; Franziska Preuß; Luise Kummer; Miriam Gössner; Karolin Horchler	1:07:36.4 (0+0) (0+1) (0+0) (0+1) (0+1) (1+3) (0+1) (0+0)
World Championships details	Norway; Synnøve Solemdal; Fanny Horn Birkeland; Tiril Eckhoff; Marte Olsbu	1:07:10.0 (0+0) (0+0) (0+1) (0+1) (0+0) (0+0) (0+2) (0+2)	France; Justine Braisaz; Anaïs Bescond; Anaïs Chevalier; Marie Dorin Habert	1:07:15.3 (0+3) (0+2) (0+0) (0+0) (0+0) (0+1) (0+2) (0+0)	Germany; Franziska Preuß; Franziska Hildebrand; Maren Hammerschmidt; Laura Dahlmeier	1:07:38.6 (0+0) (0+2) (0+0) (0+0) (0+0) (0+2) (0+0) (0+0)

== Standings ==
#	Name	HOC	RUH	ANT	PRE	WCH	Total
1.	Germany	54	54	31	48	48	235
2	Ukraine	48	60	32	54	40	234
3	France	40	36	60	38	54	228
4	Czech Republic	38	38	54	60	38	228
5	Italy	60	48	43	40	36	227
6	Poland	43	34	30	43	43	193
7	Russia	32	43	48	36	30	189
8	Norway	34	40	40	DNS	60	174
9	Sweden	30	30	38	34	31	165
10	Kazakhstan	27	29	34	30	34	154
11	Belarus	36	28	36	28	23	151
12	Canada	31	32	28	24	26	141
13	Switzerland	29	27	29	29	25	139
14	Austria	24	23	26	32	29	134
15	United States	26	25	24	31	28	134
16	Bulgaria	22	19	27	25	21	114
17	Romania	21	24	22	27	20	114
18	Lithuania	20	21	25	26	—	92
19	Slovakia	28	31	—	DNS	27	86
20	Slovenia	25	22	—	—	32	79
21	Estonia	19	20	23	—	—	62
22	Finland	23	—	—	—	24	47
23	China	—	26	—	—	19	45
24	Japan	—	—	—	—	22	22
25	South Korea	—	—	—	—	18	18
