= 2015–16 Biathlon World Cup =

Biathlon competition

Discipline	Men	Women
Overall	(France) Martin Fourcade	(Czech Republic) Gabriela Soukalová
Nations Cup	Norway	Germany
Individual	(France) Martin Fourcade	(Italy) Dorothea Wierer
Sprint	(France) Martin Fourcade	(Czech Republic) Gabriela Soukalová
Pursuit	(France) Martin Fourcade	(Czech Republic) Gabriela Soukalová
Mass start	(France) Martin Fourcade	(Czech Republic) Gabriela Soukalová
Relay	Norway	Germany
- Mixed: Norway

Competition

The 2015–16 Biathlon World Cup was a multi-race tournament over a season of biathlon, organised by the International Biathlon Union. The season began on 29 November 2015 in Östersund, Sweden, and ended on 19 March 2016 in Khanty-Mansiysk, Russia. The defending overall champions from the 2014–15 Biathlon World Cup were Martin Fourcade of France and Darya Domracheva of Belarus, but Domracheva missed the season due to illness.

== Calendar ==
Below is the IBU World Cup calendar for the 2015–16 season.

Stage	Location	Date	Individual	Sprint	Pursuit	Mass start	Relay	Mixed relay	Single mixed relay	Details
1	(Sweden) Östersund	29 November–6 December	●	●	●			●	●	details
2	(Austria) Hochfilzen	11–13 December		●	●		●			details
3	(Slovenia) Pokljuka	17–20 December		●	●	●				details
4	(Germany) Ruhpolding (Note: Originally scheduled in Oberhof on 7–10 January, relocated in Ruhpolding due to lack of snow.)	8–10 January		●	●	●				details
5	(Germany) Ruhpolding	13–17 January	●			●	●			details
6	(Italy) Antholz-Anterselva	21–24 January		●	●		●			details
7	(Canada) Canmore	4–7 February		●		●		●	●	details
8	(United States) Presque Isle	11–13 February		●	●		●			details
WC	(Norway) Holmenkollen	3–13 March	●	●	●	●	●	●		World Championships
9	(Russia) Khanty-Mansiysk	17–19 March		●	●	Cancelled				details
Total: 65 (30 men's, 30 women's, 5 mixed)			3	9	8	5	5	3	2	

== Men ==
=== World Cup podiums ===
WC	Date	Place	Discipline	Winner	Second	Third	Yellow bib	Det.
1	2 December 2015	(Sweden) Östersund	20 km Individual	(Norway) Ole Einar Bjørndalen	(Germany) Simon Schempp	(Russia) Alexey Volkov	(Norway) Ole Einar Bjørndalen	Detail
1	5 December 2015	(Sweden) Östersund	10 km Sprint	(France) Martin Fourcade	(Germany) Arnd Peiffer	(Norway) Ole Einar Bjørndalen	(Norway) Ole Einar Bjørndalen	Detail
1	6 December 2015	(Sweden) Östersund	12.5 km Pursuit	(France) Martin Fourcade	(Germany) Arnd Peiffer	(France) Quentin Fillon Maillet	(France) Martin Fourcade	Detail
2	11 December 2015	(Austria) Hochfilzen	10 km Sprint	(Germany) Simon Schempp	(France) Martin Fourcade	(Norway) Tarjei Bø	(France) Martin Fourcade	Detail
2	12 December 2015	(Austria) Hochfilzen	12.5 km Pursuit	(France) Martin Fourcade	(Germany) Simon Schempp	(Russia) Anton Shipulin	(France) Martin Fourcade	Detail
3	17 December 2015	(Slovenia) Pokljuka	10 km Sprint	(Germany) Simon Schempp	(Norway) Ole Einar Bjørndalen	(Russia) Evgenii Garanichev	(France) Martin Fourcade	Detail
3	19 December 2015	(Slovenia) Pokljuka	12.5 km Pursuit	(Germany) Simon Schempp	(France) Martin Fourcade	(Russia) Anton Shipulin	(France) Martin Fourcade	Detail
3	20 December 2015	(Slovenia) Pokljuka	15 km Mass Start	(France) Jean-Guillaume Béatrix	(Norway) Emil Hegle Svendsen	(Norway) Ole Einar Bjørndalen	(France) Martin Fourcade	Detail
4	8 January 2016	(Germany) Ruhpolding	10 km Sprint	(Norway) Johannes Thingnes Bø	(Norway) Tarjei Bø	(Norway) Emil Hegle Svendsen	(France) Martin Fourcade	Detail
4	9 January 2016	(Germany) Ruhpolding	12.5 km Pursuit	(Austria) Simon Eder	(France) Martin Fourcade	(Czech Republic) Michal Šlesingr	(France) Martin Fourcade	Detail
4	10 January 2016	(Germany) Ruhpolding	15 km Mass Start	(France) Martin Fourcade	(Czech Republic) Ondřej Moravec	(Norway) Tarjei Bø	(France) Martin Fourcade	Detail
5	13 January 2016	(Germany) Ruhpolding	20 km Individual	(France) Martin Fourcade	(Austria) Simon Eder	(Russia) Anton Shipulin	(France) Martin Fourcade	Detail
5	16 January 2016	(Germany) Ruhpolding	15 km Mass Start	(Germany) Erik Lesser	(France) Martin Fourcade	(Russia) Evgenii Garanichev	(France) Martin Fourcade	Detail
6	22 January 2016	(Italy) Anterselva	10 km Sprint	(Germany) Simon Schempp	(Russia) Maxim Tsvetkov	(Norway) Tarjei Bø	(France) Martin Fourcade	Detail
6	23 January 2016	(Italy) Anterselva	12.5 km Pursuit	(Russia) Anton Shipulin	(Germany) Simon Schempp	(Norway) Johannes Thingnes Bø	(France) Martin Fourcade	Detail
7	4 February 2016	(Canada) Canmore	10 km Sprint	(France) Martin Fourcade	(Russia) Anton Shipulin	(Germany) Simon Schempp	(France) Martin Fourcade	Detail
7	6 February 2016	(Canada) Canmore	15 km Mass Start	(Italy) Dominik Windisch	(Germany) Benedikt Doll	(France) Quentin Fillon Maillet	(France) Martin Fourcade	Detail
8	11 February 2016	(United States) Presque Isle	10 km Sprint	(Norway) Johannes Thingnes Bø	(Russia) Anton Shipulin	(France) Martin Fourcade	(France) Martin Fourcade	Detail
8	12 February 2016	(United States) Presque Isle	12.5 km Pursuit	(France) Martin Fourcade	(Norway) Johannes Thingnes Bø	(Russia) Anton Shipulin	(France) Martin Fourcade	Detail
WCH	5 March 2016	(Norway) Oslo	10 km Sprint	(France) Martin Fourcade	(Norway) Ole Einar Bjørndalen	(Ukraine) Serhiy Semenov	(France) Martin Fourcade	Detail
WCH	6 March 2016	(Norway) Oslo	12.5 km Pursuit	(France) Martin Fourcade	(Norway) Ole Einar Bjørndalen	(Norway) Emil Hegle Svendsen	(France) Martin Fourcade	Detail
WCH	10 March 2016	(Norway) Oslo	20 km Individual	(France) Martin Fourcade	(Austria) Dominik Landertinger	(Austria) Simon Eder	(France) Martin Fourcade	Detail
WCH	13 March 2016	(Norway) Oslo	15 km Mass Start	(Norway) Johannes Thingnes Bø	(France) Martin Fourcade	(Norway) Ole Einar Bjørndalen	(France) Martin Fourcade	Detail
9	18 March 2016	(Russia) Khanty-Mansiysk	10 km Sprint	(Austria) Julian Eberhard	(Germany) Simon Schempp	(Germany) Arnd Peiffer	(France) Martin Fourcade	Detail
9	19 March 2016	(Russia) Khanty-Mansiysk	12.5 km Pursuit	(Germany) Simon Schempp	(Norway) Johannes Thingnes Bø	(Germany) Erik Lesser	(France) Martin Fourcade	Detail
9	20 March 2016	(Russia) Khanty-Mansiysk	15 km Mass Start	Cancelled due to strong winds			(France) Martin Fourcade	Detail

==== Men's Relay Podiums ====
WC	Date	Place	Discipline	Winner	Second	Third	Leader	Det.
2	13 December 2015	(Austria) Hochfilzen	4 × 7.5 km Relay	Russia Alexey Volkov; Evgenii Garanichev; Dmitry Malyshko; Anton Shipulin	Norway Henrik L'Abée-Lund; Johannes Thingnes Bø; Tarjei Bø; Emil Hegle Svendsen	France Simon Fourcade; Quentin Fillon Maillet; Simon Desthieux; Martin Fourcade	Russia	Detail
5	15 January 2016	(Germany) Ruhpolding	4 × 7.5 km Relay	Norway Ole Einar Bjørndalen; Johannes Thingnes Bø; Tarjei Bø; Emil Hegle Svendsen	Russia Alexey Volkov; Evgenii Garanichev; Maxim Tsvetkov; Anton Shipulin	Austria Sven Grossegger; Julian Eberhard; Simon Eder; Dominik Landertinger	Russia / Norway	Detail
6	24 January 2016	(Italy) Anterselva	4 × 7.5 km Relay	Russia Maxim Tsvetkov; Evgenii Garanichev; Dmitry Malyshko; Anton Shipulin	Germany Erik Lesser; Benedikt Doll; Arnd Peiffer; Simon Schempp	Norway Ole Einar Bjørndalen; Lars Helge Birkeland; Johannes Thingnes Bø; Erlend Bjøntegaard	Russia	Detail
8	13 February 2016	(United States) Presque Isle	4 × 7.5 km Relay	Norway Lars Helge Birkeland; Erlend Bjøntegaard; Johannes Thingnes Bø; Tarjei Bø	France Simon Fourcade; Quentin Fillon Maillet; Simon Desthieux; Jean-Guillaume Béatrix	Germany Erik Lesser; Andreas Birnbacher; Daniel Böhm; Benedikt Doll	Norway	Detail
WCH	12 March 2016	(Norway) Oslo	4 × 7.5 km Relay	Norway Ole Einar Bjørndalen; Tarjei Bø; Johannes Thingnes Bø; Emil Hegle Svendsen	Germany Erik Lesser; Benedikt Doll; Arnd Peiffer; Simon Schempp	Canada Christian Gow; Nathan Smith; Scott Gow; Brendan Green	Norway	Detail

=== Standings ===
==== Overall ====
Rank	after all 25 races	Points
Yellow bib	(France) Martin Fourcade	1151
2.	(Norway) Johannes Thingnes Bø	820
3.	(Russia) Anton Shipulin	806
4.	(Germany) Simon Schempp	769
5.	(Austria) Simon Eder	714
6.	(Norway) Tarjei Bø	708
7.	(Russia) Evgenii Garanichev	659
8.	(Germany) Benedikt Doll	602
9.	(Austria) Dominik Landertinger	600
10.	(Norway) Emil Hegle Svendsen	595

==== Individual ====
Rank	after all 3 races	Points
Red bib	(France) Martin Fourcade	140
2.	(Austria) Simon Eder	138
3.	(Austria) Dominik Landertinger	105
4.	(Russia) Anton Shipulin	100
5.	(Norway) Johannes Thingnes Bø	90

==== Sprint ====
Rank	after all 9 races	Points
Red bib	(France) Martin Fourcade	379
2.	(Germany) Simon Schempp	316
3.	(Norway) Johannes Thingnes Bø	298
4.	(Germany) Arnd Peiffer	262
5.	(Russia) Anton Shipulin	251

==== Pursuit ====
Rank	after all 8 races	Points
Red bib	(France) Martin Fourcade	391
2.	(Russia) Anton Shipulin	300
3.	(Norway) Johannes Thingnes Bø	278
4.	(Norway) Tarjei Bø	267
5.	(Austria) Simon Eder	254

==== Mass start ====
Rank	after all 5 races	Points
Red bib	(France) Martin Fourcade	242
2.	(France) Quentin Fillon Maillet	162
3.	(Russia) Anton Shipulin	155
4.	(Norway) Johannes Thingnes Bø	154
5.	(Russia) Evgenii Garanichev	153

==== Relay ====
Rank	after all 5 races	Points
1.	Norway	282
2.	Russia	255
3.	Germany	236
4.	France	217
5.	Austria	209

==== Nation ====
Rank	after all 22 races	Points
1.	Norway	7808
2.	Germany	7518
3.	Russia	7178
4.	France	7113
5.	Austria	6795

== Women ==
=== World Cup podiums ===
WC	Date	Place	Discipline	Winner	Second	Third	Yellow bib	Det.
1	3 December 2015	(Sweden) Östersund	15 km Individual	(Italy) Dorothea Wierer	(France) Marie Dorin Habert	(Ukraine) Olena Pidhrushna	(Italy) Dorothea Wierer	Detail
1	5 December 2015	(Sweden) Östersund	7.5 km Sprint	(Czech Republic) Gabriela Soukalová	(Italy) Federica Sanfilippo	(Ukraine) Olena Pidhrushna	(Czech Republic) Gabriela Soukalová	Detail
1	6 December 2015	(Sweden) Östersund	10 km Pursuit	(Finland) Kaisa Mäkäräinen	(Italy) Dorothea Wierer	(Germany) Franziska Hildebrand	(Czech Republic) Gabriela Soukalová	Detail
2	11 December 2015	(Austria) Hochfilzen	7.5 km Sprint	(Germany) Franziska Hildebrand	(Germany) Maren Hammerschmidt	(Germany) Miriam Gössner	(Czech Republic) Gabriela Soukalová	Detail
2	12 December 2015	(Austria) Hochfilzen	10 km Pursuit	(Germany) Laura Dahlmeier	(Germany) Maren Hammerschmidt	(Czech Republic) Gabriela Soukalová	(Czech Republic) Gabriela Soukalová	Detail
3	18 December 2015	(Slovenia) Pokljuka	7.5 km Sprint	(France) Marie Dorin Habert	(Germany) Laura Dahlmeier	(Germany) Franziska Hildebrand	(Czech Republic) Gabriela Soukalová	Detail
3	19 December 2015	(Slovenia) Pokljuka	10 km Pursuit	(Germany) Laura Dahlmeier	(France) Marie Dorin Habert	(Finland) Kaisa Mäkäräinen	(France) Marie Dorin Habert	Detail
3	20 December 2015	(Slovenia) Pokljuka	12.5 km Mass Start	(Finland) Kaisa Mäkäräinen	(Czech Republic) Gabriela Soukalová	(Russia) Olga Podchufarova	(Czech Republic) Gabriela Soukalová	Detail
4	8 January 2016	(Germany) Ruhpolding	7.5 km Sprint	(Germany) Franziska Hildebrand	(Czech Republic) Gabriela Soukalová	(Finland) Kaisa Mäkäräinen	(Czech Republic) Gabriela Soukalová	Detail
4	9 January 2016	(Germany) Ruhpolding	10 km Pursuit	(Germany) Laura Dahlmeier	(Czech Republic) Gabriela Soukalová	(Italy) Dorothea Wierer	(Czech Republic) Gabriela Soukalová	Detail
4	10 January 2016	(Germany) Ruhpolding	12.5 km Mass Start	(Germany) Laura Dahlmeier	(France) Marie Dorin Habert	(Norway) Tiril Eckhoff	(Czech Republic) Gabriela Soukalová	Detail
5	14 January 2016	(Germany) Ruhpolding	15 km Individual	(Italy) Dorothea Wierer	(Finland) Kaisa Mäkäräinen	(Czech Republic) Gabriela Soukalová	(Czech Republic) Gabriela Soukalová	Detail
5	16 January 2016	(Germany) Ruhpolding	12.5 km Mass Start	(Czech Republic) Gabriela Soukalová	(Germany) Franziska Hildebrand	(Germany) Laura Dahlmeier	(Czech Republic) Gabriela Soukalová	Detail
6	21 January 2016	(Italy) Anterselva	7.5 km Sprint	(Russia) Olga Podchufarova	(Italy) Dorothea Wierer	(Russia) Ekaterina Yurlova	(Czech Republic) Gabriela Soukalová	Detail
6	23 January 2016	(Italy) Anterselva	10 km Pursuit	(Russia) Ekaterina Yurlova	(Switzerland) Selina Gasparin	(Italy) Dorothea Wierer	(Czech Republic) Gabriela Soukalová	Detail
7	5 February 2016	(Canada) Canmore	7.5 km Sprint	(Ukraine) Olena Pidhrushna	(Poland) Krystyna Guzik	(Italy) Dorothea Wierer	(Czech Republic) Gabriela Soukalová	Detail
7	6 February 2016	(Canada) Canmore	12.5 km Mass Start	(Italy) Dorothea Wierer	(France) Marie Dorin Habert	(Czech Republic) Gabriela Soukalová	(Czech Republic) Gabriela Soukalová	Detail
8	11 February 2016	(United States) Presque Isle	7.5 km Sprint	(Czech Republic) Gabriela Soukalová	(United States) Susan Dunklee	(Poland) Krystyna Guzik	(Czech Republic) Gabriela Soukalová	Detail
8	12 February 2016	(United States) Presque Isle	10 km Pursuit	(Czech Republic) Gabriela Soukalová	(Finland) Kaisa Mäkäräinen	(France) Marie Dorin Habert	(Czech Republic) Gabriela Soukalová	Detail
WCH	5 March 2016	(Norway) Oslo	7.5 km Sprint	(Norway) Tiril Eckhoff	(France) Marie Dorin Habert	(Germany) Laura Dahlmeier	(Czech Republic) Gabriela Soukalová	Detail
WCH	6 March 2016	(Norway) Oslo	10 km Pursuit	(Germany) Laura Dahlmeier	(Italy) Dorothea Wierer	(France) Marie Dorin Habert	(Czech Republic) Gabriela Soukalová	Detail
WCH	9 March 2016	(Norway) Oslo	15 km Individual	(France) Marie Dorin Habert	(France) Anaïs Bescond	(Germany) Laura Dahlmeier	(Czech Republic) Gabriela Soukalová	Detail
WCH	13 March 2016	(Norway) Oslo	12.5 km Mass Start	(France) Marie Dorin Habert	(Germany) Laura Dahlmeier	(Finland) Kaisa Mäkäräinen	(Czech Republic) Gabriela Soukalová	Detail
9	17 March 2016	(Russia) Khanty-Mansiysk	7.5 km Sprint	(Finland) Kaisa Mäkäräinen	(Czech Republic) Gabriela Soukalová	(Norway) Marte Olsbu	(Czech Republic) Gabriela Soukalová	Detail
9	19 March 2016	(Russia) Khanty-Mansiysk	10 km Pursuit	(Finland) Kaisa Mäkäräinen	(France) Marie Dorin Habert	(Italy) Dorothea Wierer	(Czech Republic) Gabriela Soukalová	Detail
9	20 March 2016	(Russia) Khanty-Mansiysk	12.5 km Mass Start	Cancelled due to strong winds			(Czech Republic) Gabriela Soukalová	Detail

==== Women's Relay Podiums ====
WC	Date	Place	Discipline	Winner	Second	Third	Leader	Det.
2	13 December 2015	(Austria) Hochfilzen	4 × 6 km Relay	Italy Lisa Vittozzi; Karin Oberhofer; Federica Sanfilippo; Dorothea Wierer	Germany Franziska Hildebrand; Maren Hammerschmidt; Vanessa Hinz; Franziska Preuß	Ukraine Yuliia Dzhima; Olga Abramova; Valentyna Semerenko; Olena Pidhrushna	Italy	Detail
5	17 January 2016	(Germany) Ruhpolding	4 × 6 km Relay	Ukraine Iryna Varvynets; Yuliia Dzhima; Valentyna Semerenko; Olena Pidhrushna	Germany Karolin Horchler; Miriam Gössner; Maren Hammerschmidt; Laura Dahlmeier	Italy Lisa Vittozzi; Karin Oberhofer; Alexia Runggaldier; Dorothea Wierer	Italy / Ukraine	Detail
6	24 January 2016	(Italy) Anterselva	4 × 6 km Relay	France Justine Braisaz; Anaïs Bescond; Anaïs Chevalier; Marie Dorin Habert	Czech Republic Eva Puskarčíková; Lucie Charvátová; Gabriela Soukalová; Veronika Vítková	Russia Ekaterina Shumilova; Anastasia Zagoruiko; Ekaterina Yurlova; Olga Podchufarova	Italy	Detail
8	13 February 2016	(United States) Presque Isle	4 × 6 km Relay	Czech Republic Eva Puskarčíková; Lucie Charvátová; Gabriela Soukalová; Veronika Vítková	Ukraine Iryna Varvynets; Natalya Burdyga; Yuliia Dzhima; Olena Pidhrushna	Germany Franziska Preuß; Luise Kummer; Miriam Gössner; Karolin Horchler	Italy	Detail
WCH	11 March 2016	(Norway) Oslo	4 × 6 km Relay	Norway Synnøve Solemdal; Fanny Horn Birkeland; Tiril Eckhoff; Marte Olsbu	France Justine Braisaz; Anaïs Bescond; Anaïs Chevalier; Marie Dorin Habert	Germany Franziska Preuß; Franziska Hildebrand; Maren Hammerschmidt; Laura Dahlmeier	Germany	Detail

=== Standings ===
==== Overall ====
Rank	after all 25 races	Points
Yellow bib	(Czech Republic) Gabriela Soukalová	1074
2.	(France) Marie Dorin Habert	1028
3.	(Italy) Dorothea Wierer	944
4.	(Finland) Kaisa Mäkäräinen	892
5.	(Germany) Franziska Hildebrand	793
6.	(Germany) Laura Dahlmeier	786
7.	(Ukraine) Olena Pidhrushna	754
8.	(Czech Republic) Veronika Vítková	705
9.	(France) Anaïs Bescond	666
10.	(Poland) Krystyna Guzik	566

==== Individual ====
Rank	after all 3 races	Points
Red bib	(Italy) Dorothea Wierer	154
2.	(France) Marie Dorin Habert	152
3.	(Czech Republic) Gabriela Soukalová	128
4.	(Germany) Franziska Hildebrand	112
5.	(France) Anaïs Bescond	107

==== Sprint ====
Rank	after all 9 races	Points
Red bib	(Czech Republic) Gabriela Soukalová	413
2.	(France) Marie Dorin Habert	336
3.	(Italy) Dorothea Wierer	327
4.	(Finland) Kaisa Mäkäräinen	309
5.	(Ukraine) Olena Pidhrushna	299

==== Pursuit ====
Rank	after all 8 races	Points
Red bib	(Czech Republic) Gabriela Soukalová	354
2.	(Italy) Dorothea Wierer	348
3.	(France) Marie Dorin Habert	331
4.	(Finland) Kaisa Mäkäräinen	324
5.	(Germany) Laura Dahlmeier	265

==== Mass start ====
Rank	after all 5 races	Points
Red bib	(Czech Republic) Gabriela Soukalová	241
2.	(France) Marie Dorin Habert	236
3.	(Germany) Laura Dahlmeier	228
4.	(Finland) Kaisa Mäkäräinen	179
5.	(Germany) Franziska Hildebrand	169

==== Relay ====
Rank	after all 5 races	Points
1.	Germany	236
2.	France	228
3.	Czech Republic	228
4.	Italy	227
5.	Ukraine	202

==== Nation ====
Rank	after all 22 races	Points
1.	Germany	7417
2.	France	7176
3.	Czech Republic	6944
4.	Italy	6822
5.	Ukraine	6573

=== Mixed ===
Event	Date	Place	Discipline	Winner	Second	Third	Det.
1	29 November 2015	(Sweden) Östersund	1x6 km + 1x7.5 km Single Mixed Relay	Norway Kaia Wøien Nicolaisen; Lars Helge Birkeland	Canada Rosanna Crawford; Nathan Smith	Germany Maren Hammerschmidt; Daniel Böhm	Detail
1	29 November 2015	(Sweden) Östersund	2x6 km + 2x7.5 km Mixed Relay	Norway Fanny Horn Birkeland; Tiril Eckhoff; Johannes Thingnes Bø; Tarjei Bø	Germany Franziska Hildebrand; Vanessa Hinz; Benedikt Doll; Simon Schempp	Czech Republic Veronika Vítková; Gabriela Soukalová; Michal Šlesingr; Ondřej Moravec	Detail
7	7 February 2016	(Canada) Canmore	1x6 km + 1x7.5 km Single Mixed Relay	France Marie Dorin Habert; Martin Fourcade	Austria Lisa Theresa Hauser; Simon Eder	Norway Hilde Fenne; Lars Helge Birkeland	Detail
7	7 February 2016	(Canada) Canmore	2x6 km + 2x7.5 km Mixed Relay	Germany Franziska Hildebrand; Franziska Preuß; Arnd Peiffer; Simon Schempp	Italy Dorothea Wierer; Karin Oberhofer; Lukas Hofer; Dominik Windisch	Norway Marte Olsbu; Synnøve Solemdal; Alexander Os; Håvard Bogetveit	Detail
WC	3 March 2016	(Norway) Oslo Holmenkollen	2x6 km + 2x7.5 km Mixed Relay	France Anaïs Bescond; Marie Dorin Habert; Quentin Fillon Maillet; Martin Fourcade	Germany Franziska Preuß; Franziska Hildebrand; Arnd Peiffer; Simon Schempp	Norway Marte Olsbu; Tiril Eckhoff; Johannes Thingnes Bø; Tarjei Bø	Detail

== Standings: Mixed ==
=== Mixed relay ===
Pos.		Points
1.	Norway	264
2.	Germany	252
3.	France	223
4.	Russia	191
5.	Canada	183

- Final standings after 5 races.

== Medal table ==
Rank	Nation	Gold	Silver	Bronze	Total
1	France	17	14	6	37
2	Germany	14	18	13	45
3	Norway	11	8	15	34
4	Czech Republic	5	6	5	16
5	Italy	5	5	5	15
6	Russia	5	4	10	19
7	Finland	4	2	3	9
8	Austria	2	3	2	7
9	Ukraine	2	1	4	7
10	Canada	0	1	1	2
10	Poland	0	1	1	2
12	Switzerland	0	1	0	1
12	United States	0	1	0	1
Totals (13 entries)		65	65	65	195

== Achievements ==
First World Cup career victory

Men

- Jean-Guillaume Béatrix (FRA), 27, in his 9th season — the WC 3 Mass Start in Pokljuka; first podium was 2013–14 Pursuit in Antholz-Anterselva
- Dominik Windisch (ITA), 26, in his 9th season — the WC 7 Mass Start in Canmore; it also was his first podium
- Julian Eberhard (AUT), 29, in his 8th season — the WC 9 Sprint in Khanty-Mansiysk; it also was his first podium

Women

- Dorothea Wierer (ITA), 25, in her 6th season — the WC 1 Individual in Östersund; first podium was 2013–14 Pursuit in Pokljuka
- Franziska Hildebrand (GER), 28, in her 5th season — the WC 2 Sprint in Hochfilzen; first podium was 2014–15 Sprint in Nové Město
- Olga Podchufarova (RUS), 23, in her 4th season — the WC 6 Sprint in Antholz-Anterselva; first podium was 2014–15 Pursuit in Hochfilzen

First World Cup podium

Men

- Maxim Tsvetkov (RUS), 24, in his 4th season — no. 2 in the WC 6 Sprint in Antholz-Anterselva
- Dominik Windisch (ITA), 26, in his 9th season — no. 1 WC 7 Mass Start in Canmore
- Julian Eberhard (AUT), 29, in his 8th season — no. 1 in the WC 9 Sprint in Khanty-Mansiyk

Women

- Federica Sanfilippo (ITA), 25, in her 3rd season — no. 2 in the WC 1 Sprint in Östersund
- Maren Hammerschmidt (GER), 26, in her 4th season — no. 2 in the WC 2 Sprint in Hochfilzen
- Marte Olsbu (NOR), 25, in her 3rd season — no. 3 in the WC 9 Sprint in Khanty-Mansiysk

Victory in this World Cup (all-time number of victories in parentheses)

Men

- Martin Fourcade (FRA), 10 (47) first places
- Simon Schempp (GER), 5 (10) first places
- Johannes Thingnes Bø (NOR), 3 (11) first places
- Ole Einar Bjørndalen (NOR), 1 (94) first place
- Anton Shipulin (RUS), 1 (8) first place
- Simon Eder (AUT), 1 (3) first place
- Erik Lesser (GER), 1 (2) first place
- Jean-Guillaume Béatrix (FRA), 1 (1) first place
- Dominik Windisch (ITA), 1 (1) first place
- Julian Eberhard (AUT), 1 (1) first place

Women

- Laura Dahlmeier (GER), 5 (7) first places
- Kaisa Mäkäräinen (FIN), 4 (19) first places
- Gabriela Soukalová (CZE), 4 (12) first places
- Marie Dorin Habert (FRA), 3 (5) first places
- Dorothea Wierer (ITA), 3 (3) first places
- Franziska Hildebrand (GER), 2 (2) first places
- Ekaterina Yurlova (RUS), 1 (2) first place
- Olena Pidhrushna (UKR), 1 (2) first place
- Tiril Eckhoff (NOR), 1 (2) first place
- Olga Podchufarova (RUS), 1 (1) first place

== Retirements ==
Men

- Friedrich Pinter (AUT)
- Scott Perras (CAN)
- Indrek Tobreluts (EST)
- Andreas Birnbacher (GER)
- Christian De Lorenzi (ITA)
- Christian Martinelli (ITA)
- Alexander Os (NOR)
- Krzysztof Pływaczyk (POL)
- Ivan Tcherezov (RUS)
- Miroslav Matiaško (SVK)

Women

- Zina Kocher (CAN)
- Audrey Vaillancourt (CAN)
- Barbora Tomešová (CZE)
- Daria Yurlova (EST)
- Annukka Siltakorpi (FIN)
- Marine Bolliet (FRA)
- Elena Khrustaleva (KAZ)
- Marina Lebedeva (KAZ)
- Marija Kaznacenko (LTU)
- Bente Landheim (NOR)
- Jori Mørkve (NOR)
- Elise Ringen (NOR)
- Olga Vilukhina (RUS)
- Martina Chrapánová (SVK)
- Natália Prekopová (SVK)
- Natalya Burdyga (UKR)
- Annelies Cook (USA)
- Hannah Dreissigacker (USA)
