= 2015–16 Biathlon World Cup – Mass start Men =

The 2015–16 Biathlon World Cup – Mass start Men started on Sunday December 20, 2015 in Pokljuka and finished on Sunday March 20, 2016 in Khanty-Mansiysk. The defending titlist is Anton Shipulin of Russia.

== 2014-15 Top 3 Standings ==
Medal	Athlete	Points
Gold:	(Russia) Anton Shipulin	242
Silver:	(Slovenia) Jakov Fak	204
Bronze:	(France) Martin Fourcade	186

== Medal winners ==
Event:	Gold:	Time	Silver:	Time	Bronze:	Time
15 km Mass Start details	Jean-Guillaume Béatrix; France	35:33.7 (0+0+0+0)	Emil Hegle Svendsen; Norway	35:34.0 (0+0+1+0)	Ole Einar Bjørndalen; Norway	35:36.2 (1+0+1+0)
15 km Mass Start details	Martin Fourcade; France	34:07.2 (0+1+0+0)	Ondřej Moravec; Czech Republic	34:20.9 (0+0+0+0)	Tarjei Bø; Norway	34:36.9 (2+0+1+0)
15 km Mass Start details	Erik Lesser; Germany	40:29.3 (0+0+0+0)	Martin Fourcade; France	40:39.1 (0+0+0+1)	Evgeniy Garanichev; Russia	40:42.4 (0+0+0+1)
Canmore details	Dominik Windisch; Italy	40:37.1 (1+0+2+1)	Benedikt Doll; Germany	40:41.2 (2+1+0+1)	Quentin Fillon Maillet; France	40:45.7 (1+0+1+1)
Holmenkollen details	Johannes Thingnes Bø; Norway	37:05.1 (0+0+1+0)	Martin Fourcade; France	37:07.9 (1+0+0+0)	Ole Einar Bjørndalen; Norway	37:11.8 (0+0+0+0)
Khanty-Mansiysk	Cancelled					

== Standings ==
#	Name	POK	RU1	RU2	CAN	WCH	KHA	Total
1	Martin Fourcade (FRA)	36	60	54	38	54	—	242
2	Quentin Fillon Maillet (FRA)	31	34	28	48	21	—	162
3	Anton Shipulin (RUS)	30	26	43	24	32	—	155
4	Johannes Thingnes Bø (NOR)	34	31	29	—	60	—	154
5	Evgeniy Garanichev (RUS)	27	36	48	26	16	—	153
6	Arnd Peiffer (GER)	28	40	4	34	40	—	146
7	Benedikt Doll (GER)	12	30	22	54	23	—	141
8	Tarjei Bø (NOR)	23	48	30	—	38	—	139
9	Dominik Windisch (ITA)	32	—	—	60	43	—	135
10	Simon Desthieux (FRA)	38	21	34	22	14	—	129
11	Ole Einar Bjørndalen (NOR)	48	29	2	—	48	—	127
12	Ondřej Moravec (CZE)	4	54	36	32	—	—	126
13	Dominik Landertinger (AUT)	24	16	16	43	26	—	125
14	Simon Schempp (GER)	43	—	38	20	22	—	123
15	Emil Hegle Svendsen (NOR)	54	28	31	—	6	—	119
16	Erik Lesser (GER)	25	—	60	6	27	—	118
17	Lowell Bailey (USA)	16	25	20	21	31	—	113
18	Simon Eder (AUT)	—	20	32	27	30	—	109
19	Simon Fourcade (FRA)	20	38	25	23	—	—	106
20	Jean-Guillaume Béatrix (FRA)	60	10	—	30	—	—	100
21	Nathan Smith (CAN)	29	12	26	25	—	—	92
22	Andreas Birnbacher (GER)	40	27	18	—	—	—	85
23	Tim Burke (USA)	18	—	—	36	29	—	83
24	Andrejs Rastorgujevs (LAT)	—	32	—	40	10	—	82
25	Michal Krčmář (CZE)	—	8	40	12	18	—	78
26	Dmytro Pidruchnyi (UKR)	14	43	10	—	—	—	67
27	Dmitry Malyshko (RUS)	21	23	12	8	—	—	64
28	Serhiy Semenov (UKR)	—	—	—	29	34	—	63
29	Maxim Tsvetkov (RUS)	10	22	27	4	—	—	63
30	Sven Grossegger (AUT)	—	14	23	16	—	—	53
31	Fredrik Lindström (SWE)	22	6	24	—	—	—	52
32	Michal Šlesingr (CZE)	—	24	—	2	24	—	50
33	Alexey Slepov (RUS)	26	2	—	18	—	—	46
34	Jakov Fak (SLO)	—	—	—	—	36	—	36
35	Julian Eberhard (AUT)	8	18	—	10	—	—	36
36	Matej Kazár (SVK)	—	—	—	32	—	—	32
37	Vladimir Chepelin (BLR)	—	—	—	—	28	—	28
37	Artem Pryma (UKR)	—	—	—	28	—	—	28
39	Anton Babikov (RUS)	—	—	—	—	25	—	25
40	Krasimir Anev (BUL)	—	4	8	—	12	—	24
41	Torstein Stenersen (SWE)	—	—	21	—	—	—	21
42	Vladimir Iliev (BUL)	—	—	—	—	20	—	20
43	Alexander Os (NOR)	—	—	—	14	—	—	14
43	Lukas Hofer (ITA)	—	—	14	—	—	—	14
45	Serafin Wiestner (SUI)	—	—	—	—	8	—	8
46	Erlend Bjøntegaard (NOR)	—	—	6	—	—	—	6
46	Alexey Volkov (RUS)	6	—	—	—	—	—	6
48	Yan Savitskiy (KAZ)	—	—	—	—	4	—	4
49	Klemen Bauer (SLO)	2	—	—	—	—	—	2
