= 2015–16 Biathlon World Cup – Mixed Relay =

The 2015–16 Biathlon World Cup – Mixed Relay started on Sunday 29 November 2015 in Östersund and finished on Thursday 3 March 2016 in Oslo Holmenkollen. The defending team was Norway.

The winning team was Norway.

== Competition format ==
The relay teams consist of four biathletes. Legs 1 and 2 are skied by the women, and legs 3 and 4 by the men. The women's legs are 6 kilometres (3.7 mi) and men's legs are 7.5 kilometres (4.7 mi). Every athlete's leg is skied over three laps, with two shooting rounds: one prone and one standing. For every round of five targets there are eight bullets available, though the last three can only be single-loaded manually from the spare round holders or from bullets deposited by the athlete into trays or onto the mat at the firing line. If after eight bullets there are still standing targets, one 150 metres (490 ft) penalty loop must be taken for each remaining target. The first-leg participants all start at the same time, and as in cross-country skiing relays, every athlete of a team must touch the team's next-leg participant to perform a valid changeover. On the first shooting stage of the first leg, the participant must shoot in the lane corresponding to their bib number (bib #10 shoots at lane #10 regardless of their position in the race), then for the remainder of the relay, the athletes shoot at the lane corresponding to the position they arrived (arrive at the range in 5th place, shoot at lane five).

The single mixed relay involves one male and one female biathlete each completing two legs consisting of one prone and one standing shoot. The female biathletes all start the race at the same time and complete one 6 kilometres (3.7 mi) leg before exchanging with their male counterparts who complete one 7.5 kilometres (4.7 mi) leg before exchanging again with the female skier who after completing another leg switches again with the male biathlete who completes the race. The rules regarding shooting are the same as in the regular mixed relay.

== 2014–15 Top 3 standings ==
Medal	Nation	Points
Gold:	Norway	216
Silver:	France	194
Bronze:	Czech Republic	174

== Medal winners ==
Event	Gold	Time	Silver	Time	Bronze	Time
Östersund (SR) details	Norway Kaia Wøien Nicolaisen; Lars Helge Birkeland	36:27.3 (0+0) (0+0) (0+1) (0+1) (0+1) (1+3) (0+1) (0+0)	Canada Rosanna Crawford; Nathan Smith	36:39.2 (0+2) (0+2) (0+3) (0+0) (0+0) (0+0) (0+0) (0+2)	Germany Maren Hammerschmidt; Daniel Böhm	36:40.5 (0+0) (0+3) (0+1) (0+1) (0+0) (1+3) (0+0) (0+0)
Östersund (MR) details	Norway Fanny Horn Birkeland; Tiril Eckhoff; Johannes Thingnes Bø; Tarjei Bø	1:11:42.6 (0+1) (0+1) (0+2) (0+2) (0+0) (0+3) (0+0) (0+0)	Germany Franziska Hildebrand; Vanessa Hinz; Benedikt Doll; Simon Schempp	1:12:16.2 (0+1) (0+0) (0+2) (0+1) (0+1) (0+0) (0+0) (0+2)	Czech Republic Veronika Vítková; Gabriela Koukalová; Michal Šlesingr; Ondřej Moravec	1:12:54.1 (0+3) (0+0) (0+0) (0+2) (0+1) (0+2) (0+1) (0+2)
Canmore (SR) details	France Marie Dorin Habert; Martin Fourcade	37:59.0 (0+1) (0+1) (0+0) (0+1) (0+0) (0+0) (0+0) (0+1)	Austria Lisa Theresa Hauser; Simon Eder	38:44.2 (0+1) (0+1) (0+2) (0+0) (0+3) (0+1) (0+0) (0+0)	Norway Hilde Fenne; Lars Helge Birkeland	38:54.3 (0+2) (0+0) (0+2) (0+0) (0+0) (0+1) (0+2) (0+0)
Canmore (MR) details	Germany Franziska Hildebrand; Franziska Preuß; Arnd Peiffer; Simon Schempp	1:05:38.8 (0+1) (0+0) (0+0) (0+1) (0+0) (0+0) (0+1) (0+1)	Italy Dorothea Wierer; Karin Oberhofer; Lukas Hofer; Dominik Windisch	1:06:51.7 (0+0) (0+2) (1+3) (0+3) (0+0) (0+0) (0+0) (0+2)	Norway Marte Olsbu; Synnøve Solemdal; Alexander Os; Håvard Bogetveit	1:07:02.6 (0+2) (0+1) (0+0) (0+0) (0+1) (0+2) (0+0) (0+1)
World Championships (MR) details	France Anaïs Bescond; Marie Dorin Habert; Quentin Fillon Maillet; Martin Fourcade	1:14:01.0 (0+0) (0+3) (0+0) (0+1) (0+2) (0+1) (0+0) (0+1)	Germany Franziska Preuß; Franziska Hildebrand; Arnd Peiffer; Simon Schempp	1:14:05.3 (0+2) (0+0) (0+2) (0+0) (0+0) (0+1) (0+1) (0+1)	Norway Marte Olsbu; Tiril Eckhoff; Johannes Thingnes Bø; Tarjei Bø	1:14:15.4 (0+1) (0+0) (0+2) (0+2) (0+1) (0+1) (0+3) (0+0)

== Standings ==
#	Nation	ÖST SR	ÖST MR	CAN SR	CAN MR	OSL MR	Total
1	Norway	60	60	48	48	48	264
2	Germany	48	54	36	60	54	252
3	France	20	43	60	40	60	223
4	Russia	40	38	43	34	36	191
5	Canada	54	32	29	38	30	183
6	Austria	30	29	54	28	40	181
7	Italy	32	19	40	54	34	179
8	Ukraine	36	30	38	30	43	177
9	Sweden	43	40	32	32	29	176
10	Czech Republic	28	48	28	31	38	173
11	United States	26	31	25	43	31	156
12	Belarus	22	36	22	29	32	141
13	Switzerland	18	27	26	36	27	134
14	Kazakhstan	25	26	30	26	26	133
15	Japan	31	21	31	25	22	130
15	Slovenia	21	34	23	24	28	130
17	Finland	38	20	21	27	23	129
18	Romania	29	24	24	21	19	117
19	Slovakia	24	25	20	22	24	115
20	Poland	27	28	27	—	21	103
21	South Korea	15	18	19	20	17	89
22	Latvia	34	—	34	—	16	84
23	Estonia	16	23	—	23	20	82
24	Lithuania	19	—	18	19	18	74
25	Bulgaria	23	22	—	—	25	70
26	United Kingdom	17	—	—	—	—	17
