= 2015–16 Biathlon World Cup – Individual Men =

The 2015–16 Biathlon World Cup – Individual Men started on Wednesday 2 December 2015 in Östersund and finished on Thursday 10 March 2015 at the World Championships in Kontiolahti.

== Competition format ==
The 20 kilometres (12 mi) individual race is the oldest biathlon event; the distance is skied over five laps. The biathlete shoots four times at any shooting lane, in the order of prone, standing, prone, standing, totalling 20 targets. For each missed target a fixed penalty time, usually one minute, is added to the skiing time of the biathlete. Competitors' starts are staggered, normally by 30 seconds.

== 2014–15 Top 3 Standings ==
| Medal | Athlete | Points |
|---|---|---|
| Gold: | (Ukraine) Serhiy Semenov | 142 |
| Silver: | (France) Martin Fourcade | 120 |
| Bronze: | (Norway) Emil Hegle Svendsen | 114 |

== Medal winners ==
| Event: | Gold: | Time | Silver: | Time | Bronze: | Time |
|---|---|---|---|---|---|---|
| Östersund details | Ole Einar Bjørndalen; Norway | 50:14.5 (0+0+0+0) | Simon Schempp; Germany | 50:41.6 (0+0+1+0) | Alexey Volkov; Russia | 50:52.7 (0+0+0+0) |
| Ruhpolding details | Martin Fourcade; France | 50:53.9 (0+0+1+0) | Simon Eder; Austria | 51:11.4 (0+0+0+1) | Anton Shipulin; Russia | 51:22.8 (0+0+1+0) |
| World Championships details | Martin Fourcade; France | 49:13.9 (0+1+0+0) | Dominik Landertinger; Austria | 49:19.0 (0+0+0+0) | Simon Eder; Austria | 49:28.3 (0+0+0+0) |

== Standings ==
| # | Name | ÖST | RUH | WCH | Total |
|---|---|---|---|---|---|
| 1 | Martin Fourcade (FRA) | 20 | 60 | 60 | 140 |
| 2 | Simon Eder (AUT) | 36 | 54 | 48 | 138 |
| 3 | Dominik Landertinger (AUT) | 34 | 17 | 54 | 105 |
| 4 | Anton Shipulin (RUS) | 25 | 48 | 27 | 100 |
| 5 | Johannes Thingnes Bø (NOR) | 22 | 25 | 43 | 90 |
| 6 | Andreas Birnbacher (GER) | 29 | 26 | 32 | 87 |
| 7 | Ole Einar Bjørndalen (NOR) | 60 | 0 | 24 | 84 |
| 8 | Evgeniy Garanichev (RUS) | 10 | 38 | 34 | 82 |
| 9 | Simon Schempp (GER) | 54 | — | 25 | 79 |
| 10 | Quentin Fillon Maillet (FRA) | 43 | 13 | 22 | 78 |
| 11 | Michal Krčmář (CZE) | 0 | 31 | 40 | 71 |
| 12 | Lowell Bailey (USA) | 17 | 27 | 26 | 70 |
| 13 | Simon Fourcade (FRA) | 38 | 0 | 31 | 69 |
| 14 | Tarjei Bø (NOR) | 19 | 30 | 19 | 68 |
| 15 | Emil Hegle Svendsen (NOR) | 43 | 12 | 9 | 64 |
| 16 | Erik Lesser (GER) | 2 | 24 | 36 | 62 |
| 17 | Benedikt Doll (GER) | 0 | 34 | 28 | 62 |
| 18 | Alexey Volkov (RUS) | 48 | 9 | 2 | 59 |
| 19 | Krasimir Anev (BUL) | — | 29 | 29 | 58 |
| 20 | Fredrik Lindström (SWE) | 27 | 18 | 12 | 57 |
| 21 | Ondřej Moravec (CZE) | 6 | 43 | 6 | 55 |
| 22 | Maxim Tsvetkov (RUS) | 15 | 40 | — | 55 |
| 23 | Lars Helge Birkeland (NOR) | 32 | 16 | — | 48 |
| 24 | Yan Savitskiy (KAZ) | 12 | 4 | 30 | 46 |
| 25 | Jakov Fak (SLO) | 0 | 5 | 38 | 43 |
| 26 | Simon Desthieux (FRA) | 26 | — | 13 | 39 |
| 27 | Lukas Hofer (ITA) | — | 28 | 10 | 38 |
| 28 | Vitaliy Kilchytskyy (UKR) | — | 22 | 16 | 38 |
| 29 | Torstein Stenersen (SWE) | — | 36 | 0 | 36 |
| 30 | Erlend Bjøntegaard (NOR) | — | 32 | — | 32 |
| 31 | Serhiy Semenov (UKR) | 31 | 0 | 0 | 31 |
| 32 | Sean Doherty (USA) | 24 | 0 | 7 | 31 |
| 33 | Jaroslav Soukup (CZE) | 13 | 0 | 18 | 31 |
| 34 | Henrik L'Abée-Lund (NOR) | 30 | — | — | 30 |
| 35 | Michal Šlesingr (CZE) | 0 | 8 | 21 | 29 |
| 36 | Daniel Mesotitsch (AUT) | 28 | — | — | 28 |
| 37 | Leif Nordgren (USA) | 0 | 14 | 14 | 28 |
| 38 | Brendan Green (CAN) | 0 | 23 | — | 23 |
| 39 | Scott Gow (CAN) | 0 | 0 | 23 | 23 |
| 40 | Anton Babikov (RUS) | 23 | — | — | 23 |
| 41 | Jean-Guillaume Béatrix (FRA) | 11 | 0 | 11 | 22 |
| 42 | Matej Kazár (SVK) | 0 | 21 | — | 21 |
| 43 | Artem Pryma (UKR) | 21 | — | — | 21 |
| 44 | Vladimir Iliev (BUL) | 0 | 0 | 20 | 20 |
| 45 | Johannes Kühn (GER) | — | 20 | — | 20 |
| 46 | David Komatz (AUT) | — | 19 | 0 | 19 |
| 47 | Dmitri Dyuzhev (BLR) | 16 | 3 | 0 | 19 |
| 48 | Vladimir Chepelin (BLR) | 18 | 0 | 0 | 18 |
| 49 | Kauri Kõiv (EST) | 0 | 0 | 17 | 17 |
| 50 | Dominik Windisch (ITA) | 7 | 10 | 0 | 17 |
| 51 | Oleksander Zhyrnyi (UKR) | 0 | 15 | 1 | 16 |
| 52 | Michail Kletcherov (BUL) | 0 | 0 | 15 | 15 |
| 53 | Tim Burke (USA) | 4 | 11 | 0 | 15 |
| 54 | Nathan Smith (CAN) | 14 | 0 | 0 | 14 |
| 55 | Dmitry Malyshko (RUS) | 9 | 0 | 0 | 9 |
| 56 | Rok Tršan (SLO) | 0 | 0 | 8 | 8 |
| 57 | George Buta (ROM) | 8 | 0 | 0 | 8 |
| 58 | Rene Zahkna (EST) | — | 7 | 0 | 7 |
| 59 | Miroslav Matiaško (SVK) | 0 | 6 | 0 | 6 |
| 60 | Yuryi Liadov (BLR) | 0 | — | 5 | 5 |
| 61 | Klemen Bauer (SLO) | 5 | — | — | 5 |
| 62 | Peppe Femling (SWE) | 0 | — | 4 | 4 |
| 63 | Serafin Wiestner (SUI) | 3 | 0 | 0 | 3 |
| 64 | Ruslan Tkalenko (UKR) | — | — | 3 | 3 |
| 65 | Christian De Lorenzi (ITA) | 0 | 2 | — | 2 |
| 66 | Jeremy Finello (SUI) | 0 | 1 | 0 | 1 |
| 67 | Benjamin Weger (SUI) | 1 | 0 | 0 | 1 |
