= 2015–16 Biathlon World Cup – Individual Women =

The 2015–16 Biathlon World Cup – Individual Women started on Thursday December 3, 2015 in Östersund and finished on March 9, 2016 at the World Championships in Holmenkollen. The defending titlist Kaisa Mäkäräinen of Finland finished on the 8th place. Dorothea Wierer of Italy won the title.

== Competition format ==
The 15 kilometres (9.3 mi) individual race is the oldest biathlon event; the distance is skied over five laps. The biathlete shoots four times at any shooting lane, in the order of prone, standing, prone, standing, totalling 20 targets. For each missed target a fixed penalty time, usually one minute, is added to the skiing time of the biathlete. Competitors' starts are staggered, normally by 30 seconds.

== 2014–15 Top 3 Standings ==
Medal	Athlete	Points
Gold:	(Finland) Kaisa Mäkäräinen	162
Silver:	(Belarus) Darya Domracheva	139
Bronze:	(Czech Republic) Veronika Vítková	122

== Medal winners ==
Event:	Gold:	Time	Silver:	Time	Bronze:	Time
Östersund details	Dorothea Wierer; Italy	42:17.0 (0+0+0+0)	Marie Dorin Habert; France	42:31.1 (0+2+0+0)	Olena Pidhrushna; Ukraine	42:54.8 (0+0+0+0)
Ruhpolding details	Dorothea Wierer; Italy	40:19.9 (0+0+0+0)	Kaisa Mäkäräinen; Finland	41:14.7 (1+0+0+0)	Gabriela Soukalová; Czech Republic	41:29.8 (0+1+0+0)
World Championships details	Marie Dorin Habert; France	44:02.8 (0+0+0+1)	Anaïs Bescond; France	44:15.0 (0+0+0+1)	Laura Dahlmeier; Germany	45:20.6 (1+0+1+0)

== Standings ==
#	Name	ÖST	RUH	WCH	Total
1	Dorothea Wierer (ITA)	60	60	34	154
2	Marie Dorin Habert (FRA)	54	38	60	152
3	Gabriela Soukalová (CZE)	40	48	40	128
4	Franziska Hildebrand (GER)	31	43	38	112
5	Anaïs Bescond (FRA)	32	21	54	107
6	Veronika Vítková (CZE)	36	27	43	106
7	Krystyna Guzik (POL)	30	30	36	96
8	Kaisa Mäkäräinen (FIN)	17	54	22	93
9	Nadezhda Skardino (BLR)	38	29	26	93
10	Laura Dahlmeier (GER)	—	32	48	80
11	Rosanna Crawford (CAN)	28	23	27	78
12	Olena Pidhrushna (UKR)	48	25	DNF	73
13	Selina Gasparin (SUI)	4	40	24	68
14	Tiril Eckhoff (NOR)	43	20	0	63
15	Lisa Theresa Hauser (AUT)	34	0	28	62
16	Magdalena Gwizdoń (POL)	21	10	29	60
17	Juliya Dzhyma (UKR)	23	12	19	54
18	Ekaterina Yurlova (RUS)	0	22	30	52
19	Galina Vishnevskaya (KAZ)	7	26	17	50
20	Olga Podchufarova (RUS)	16	31	—	47
21	Fanny Horn Birkeland (NOR)	27	9	10	46
22	Federica Sanfilippo (ITA)	11	34	0	45
23	Fuyuko Tachizaki (JPN)	24	0	20	44
24	Justine Braisaz (FRA)	15	0	25	40
25	Alexia Runggaldier (ITA)	—	6	31	37
26	Paulina Fialková (SVK)	0	36	0	36
27	Nastassia Dubarezava (BLR)	29	DNF	7	36
28	Yan Zhang (CHN)	18	18	0	36
29	Maren Hammerschmidt (GER)	0	19	14	33
30	Iryna Varvynets (UKR)	—	0	32	32
31	Synnøve Solemdal (NOR)	0	28	—	28
32	Mona Brorsson (SWE)	0	16	12	28
33	Darya Usanova (KAZ)	26	—	0	26
34	Monika Hojnisz (POL)	20	5	1	26
35	Ekaterina Shumilova (RUS)	13	7	6	26
36	Olga Abramova (UKR)	25	DNS	—	25
37	Darya Yurkevich (BLR)	0	24	0	24
38	Susan Dunklee (USA)	0	0	23	23
39	Jana Gereková (SVK)	6	14	3	23
40	Franziska Preuß (GER)	22	—	—	22
41	Ingela Andersson (SWE)	—	13	9	22
42	Julia Ransom (CAN)	0	0	21	21
43	Vanessa Hinz (GER)	0	17	4	21
44	Teja Gregorin (SLO)	2	—	18	20
45	Iryna Kryuko (BLR)	19	0	0	19
46	Anastasia Zagoruiko (RUS)	—	3	16	19
47	Anais Chevalier (FRA)	—	4	13	17
48	Linn Persson (SWE)	12	0	5	17
49	Karin Oberhofer (ITA)	0	0	15	15
50	Valj Semerenko (UKR)	—	15	—	15
51	Natalya Burdyga (UKR)	14	0	—	14
52	Tang Jialin (CHN)	0	1	11	12
53	Daria Virolaynen (RUS)	0	11	0	11
54	Johanna Talihaerm (EST)	10	—	—	10
55	Jitka Landová (CZE)	9	0	—	9
56	Marte Olsbu (NOR)	0	8	0	8
57	Miriam Gössner (GER)	8	0	—	8
58	Hannah Dreissigacker (USA)	0	—	8	8
59	Marine Bolliet (FRA)	5	—	—	5
60	Terézia Poliaková (SVK)	3	0	—	3
61	Celia Aymonier (FRA)	—	2	—	2
62	Tatiana Akimova (RUS)	—	—	2	2
63	Anna Magnusson (SWE)	1	—	—	1
