= Vladimir Chepelin =

Belarusian biathlete (born 1988)

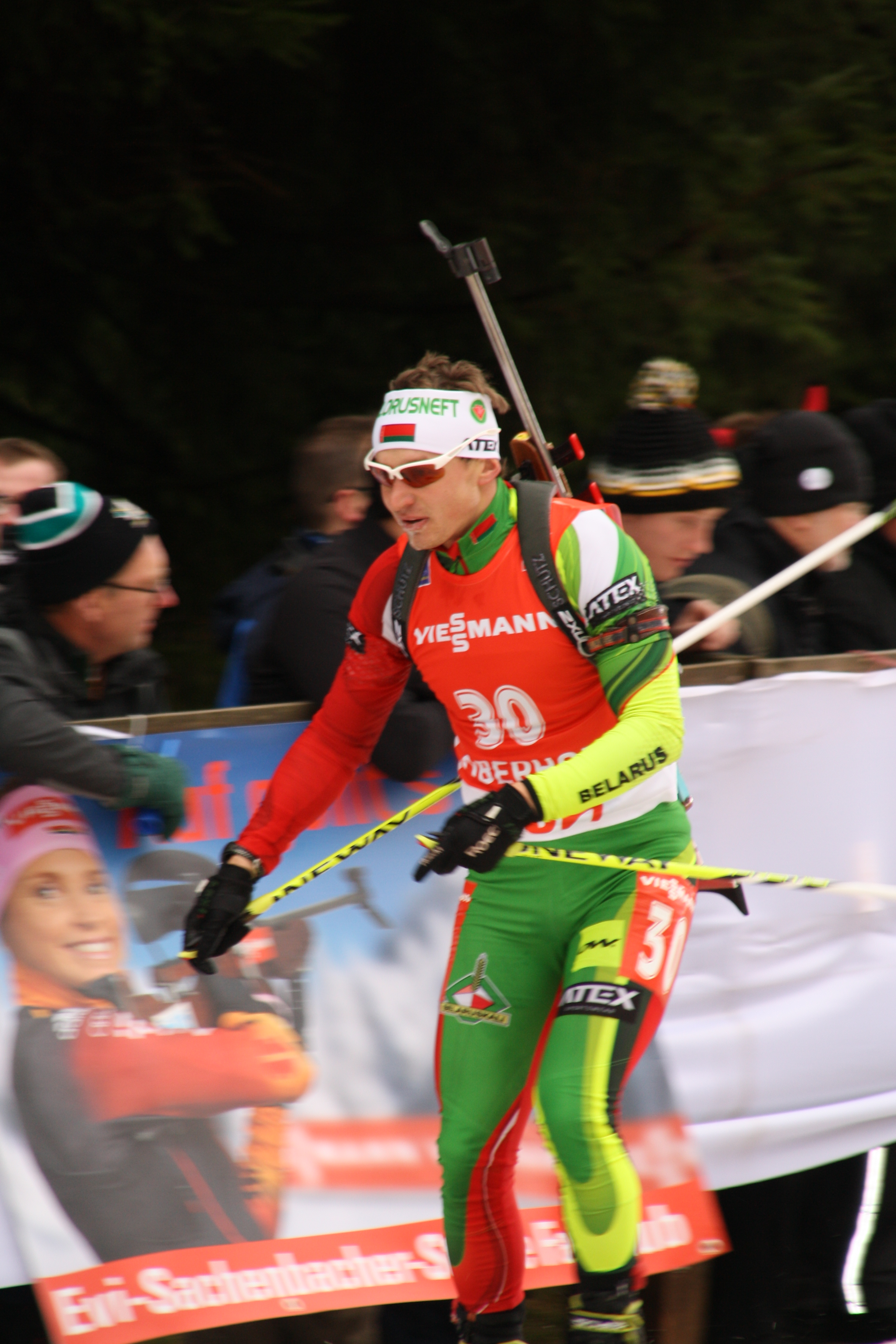
- Chepelin in 2014

Personal information
- Born: 15 July 1988 (age 38) Mogilev region, Byelorussian SSR, Soviet Union
- Height: 5 ft 7 in (170 cm)

Sport
- Sport: Skiing
Medal record
Junior World Championships
Bronze medal – third place	2009 Canmore	4 × 7.5 km relay
- Updated on 9 February 2014

Vladimir Vitalevich Chepelin (born 15 July 1988) is a Belarusian biathlete.

He competed in the 2014 Winter Olympics for Belarus where he finished 29th in the sprint.

== Biathlon results ==
All results are sourced from the International Biathlon Union.

=== Olympic Games ===
0 medals

Event	Individual	Sprint	Pursuit	Mass start	Relay	Mixed relay
(Russia) 2014 Sochi	48th	29th	41st	—	13th	10th
(South Korea) 2018 Pyeongchang	30th	34th	36th	—		5th

=== World Championships ===
0 medals

Event	Individual	Sprint	Pursuit	Mass start	Relay	Mixed relay	Single mixed relay
(Russia) 2011 Khanty-Mansiysk	—	59th	58th	—	13th	—	—
(Czech Republic) 2013 Nové Město	46th	56th	53rd	—	14th	—	—
(Finland) 2015 Kontiolahti	41st	43rd	38th	—	10th	4th	—
(Norway) 2016 Oslo Holmenkollen	56th	13th	23rd	13th	15th	9th	—
(Austria) 2017 Hochfilzen	31st	65th	—	—	19th	22nd	—
(Sweden) 2019 Östersund	15th	40th	41st	—	10th	—	16th

*During Olympic seasons competitions are only held for those events not included in the Olympic program.
