= Sven Grossegger =

Austrian biathlete (born 1987)

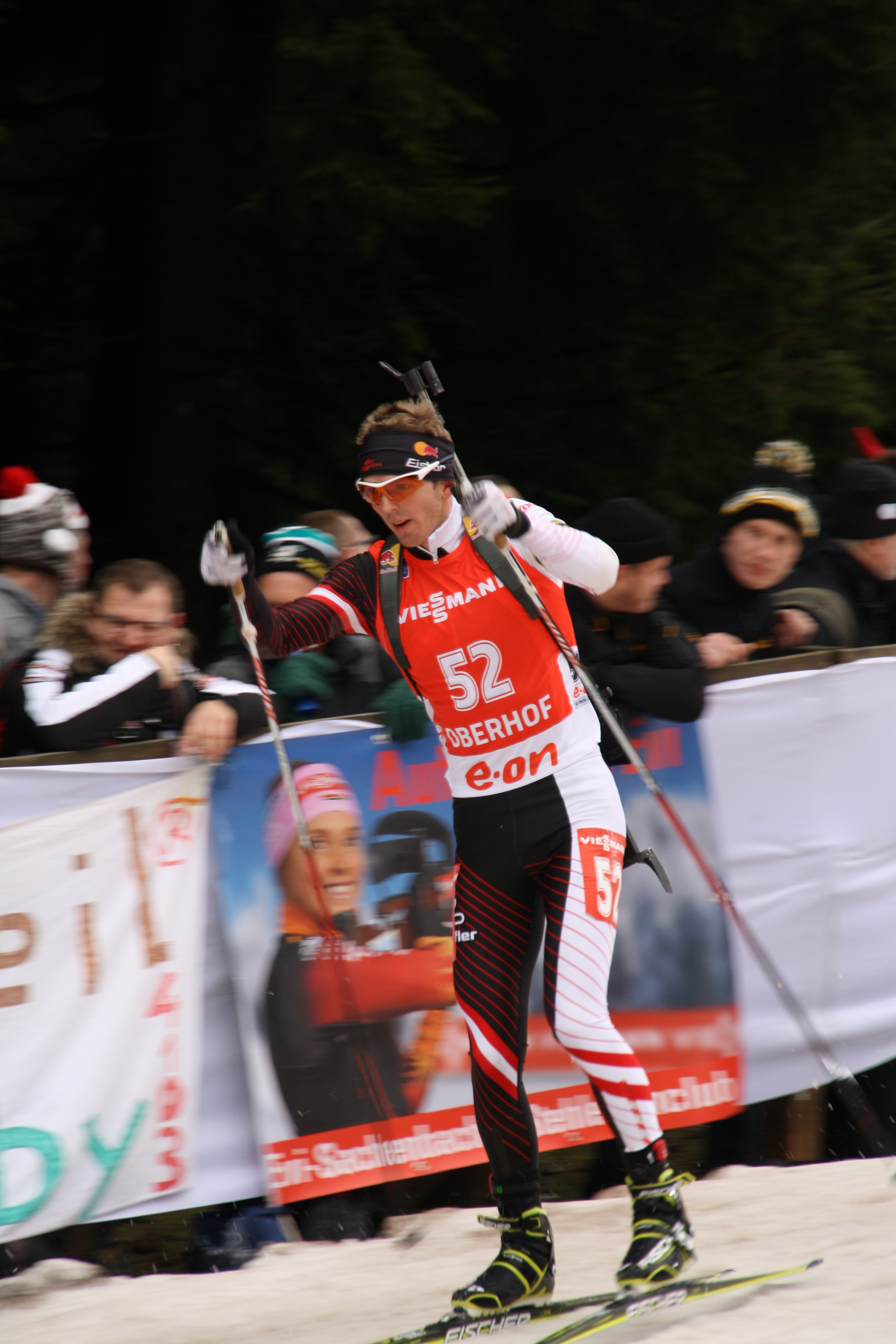

Personal information
- Nationality: Austrian
- Born: 17 November 1987 (age 38)

Sport
- Country: Austria
- Sport: Biathlon
Medal record
Youth World Championships
Silver medal – second place	2006 Presque Isle	3 × 7.5 km relay

Sven Grossegger (born 17 November 1987) is an Austrian biathlete. He competed in the 2014/15 world cup season, and represented Austria at the Biathlon World Championships 2015 in Kontiolahti.
