= 2015–16 Biathlon World Cup – World Cup 3 =

The 2015–16 Biathlon World Cup – World Cup 3 was held in Pokljuka, Slovenia, from 17 December until 20 December 2015.

== Schedule of events ==
Date	Time	Events
December 17	14:30 CET	Men's 10 km Sprint
December 18	14:30 CET	Women's 7.5 km Sprint
December 19	11:15 CET	Men's 12.5 km Pursuit
December 19	13:30 CET	Women's 10 km Pursuit
December 20	12:00 CET	Men 15 km Mass Start
December 20	14:15 CET	Women 12.5 km Mass Start

== Medal winners ==
=== Men ===
Event:	Gold:	Time	Silver:	Time	Bronze:	Time
10 km Sprint details	Simon Schempp; Germany	23:02.5 (0+0)	Ole Einar Bjørndalen; Norway	23:17.7 (0+0)	Evgeniy Garanichev; Russia	23:27.6 (0+0)
12.5 km Pursuit details	Simon Schempp; Germany	30:46.5 (0+0+0+0)	Martin Fourcade; France	31:03.1 (0+0+0+1)	Anton Shipulin; Russia	31:09.9 (0+1+1+0)
15 km Mass Start details	Jean-Guillaume Béatrix; France	35:33.7 (0+0+0+0)	Emil Hegle Svendsen; Norway	35:34.0 (0+0+1+0)	Ole Einar Bjørndalen; Norway	35:36.2 (1+0+1+0)

=== Women ===
Event:	Gold:	Time	Silver:	Time	Bronze:	Time
7.5 km Sprint details	Marie Dorin Habert; France	20:17.8 (0+0)	Laura Dahlmeier; Germany	20:18.9 (0+0)	Franziska Hildebrand; Germany	20:30.8 (0+0)
10 km Pursuit details	Laura Dahlmeier; Germany	30:08.9 (0+0+0+0)	Marie Dorin Habert; France	30:26.9 (0+0+0+0)	Kaisa Mäkäräinen; Finland	31:04.1 (0+0+0+1)
12.5 km Mass Start details	Kaisa Mäkäräinen; Finland	34:40.2 (1+0+0+0)	Gabriela Soukalová; Czech Republic	34:52.0 (0+0+0+0)	Olga Podchufarova; Russia	35:07.9 (0+0+0+0)
