= 2015–16 Biathlon World Cup – World Cup 7 =

The 2015–16 Biathlon World Cup – World Cup 7 was held in Canmore, Alberta, Canada, from 4 February until 7 February 2016.

== Schedule of events ==
Date	Time	Events
February 4	19:15 CET	Men's 10 km Sprint
February 5	19:15 CET	Women's 7.5 km Sprint
February 6	18:00 CET	Men 15 km Mass Start
February 6	19:30 CET	Women 12.5 km Mass Start
February 7	18:10 CET	Single Mixed Relay
February 7	22:05 CET	Mixed Relay

== Medal winners ==
=== Men ===
Event:	Gold:	Time	Silver:	Time	Bronze:	Time
10 km Sprint details	Martin Fourcade; France	23:51.5 (0+0)	Anton Shipulin; Russia	24:07.2 (0+0)	Simon Schempp; Germany	24:10.2 (0+0)
15 km Mass Start details	Dominik Windisch; Italy	40:37.1 (1+0+2+1)	Benedikt Doll; Germany	40:41.2 (2+1+0+1)	Quentin Fillon Maillet; France	40:45.7 (1+0+1+1)

=== Women ===
Event:	Gold:	Time	Silver:	Time	Bronze:	Time
7.5 km Sprint details	Olena Pidhrushna; Ukraine	19:56.9 (0+0)	Krystyna Guzik; Poland	20:04.4 (0+0)	Dorothea Wierer; Italy	20:09.3 (0+1)
12.5 km Mass Start details	Dorothea Wierer; Italy	36:50.0 (1+0+0+0)	Marie Dorin Habert; France	37:10.8 (0+0+0+1)	Gabriela Soukalová; Czech Republic	37:40.3 (0+0+0+1)

=== Mixed ===
Event:	Gold:	Time	Silver:	Time	Bronze:	Time
Single Mixed Relay details	France; Marie Dorin Habert; Martin Fourcade	37:59.0 (0+1) (0+1) (0+0) (0+1) (0+0) (0+0) (0+0) (0+1)	Austria; Lisa Theresa Hauser; Simon Eder	38:44.2 (0+1) (0+1) (0+2) (0+0) (0+3) (0+1) (0+0) (0+0)	Norway; Hilde Fenne; Lars Helge Birkeland	38:54.3 (0+2) (0+0) (0+2) (0+0) (0+0) (0+1) (0+2) (0+0)
2 x 6 km + 2 x 7.5 km Relay details	Germany; Franziska Hildebrand; Franziska Preuß; Arnd Peiffer; Simon Schempp	1:05:38.8 (0+1) (0+0) (0+0) (0+1) (0+0) (0+0) (0+1) (0+1)	Italy; Dorothea Wierer; Karin Oberhofer; Lukas Hofer; Dominik Windisch	1:06:51.7 (0+0) (0+2) (1+3) (0+3) (0+0) (0+0) (0+0) (0+2)	Norway; Marte Olsbu; Synnøve Solemdal; Alexander Os; Håvard Bogetveit	1:07:02.6 (0+2) (0+1) (0+0) (0+0) (0+1) (0+2) (0+0) (0+1)
