= 2015–16 Biathlon World Cup – World Cup 6 =

The 2015–16 Biathlon World Cup – World Cup 6 was held in Rasen-Antholz, Italy, from 21 January until 24 January 2016.

== Schedule of events ==
Date	Time	Events
January 21	14:30 CET	Women's 7.5 km Sprint
January 22	14:30 CET	Men's 10 km Sprint
January 23	13:15 CET	Women's 10 km Pursuit
January 23	15:30 CET	Men's 12.5 km Pursuit
January 24	11:30 CET	Women's 4x6 km Relay
January 24	14:40 CET	Men's 4x7.5 km Relay

== Medal winners ==
=== Men ===
Event:	Gold:	Time	Silver:	Time	Bronze:	Time
10 km Sprint details	Simon Schempp; Germany	23:01.2 (0+0)	Maxim Tsvetkov; Russia	23:07.0 (0+0)	Tarjei Bø; Norway	23:12.0 (0+0)
12.5 km Pursuit details	Anton Shipulin; Russia	31:51.9 (0+1+0+1)	Simon Schempp; Germany	32:02.2 (0+0+0+1)	Johannes Thingnes Bø; Norway	32:06.0 (2+0+1+0)
4x7.5 km Relay details	Russia; Maxim Tsvetkov; Evgeniy Garanichev; Dmitry Malyshko; Anton Shipulin	1:12:42.8 (0+1) (0+1) (0+0) (0+1) (0+3) (0+0) (0+1) (0+0)	Germany; Erik Lesser; Benedikt Doll; Arnd Peiffer; Simon Schempp	1:12:43.8 (0+0) (0+0) (0+0) (1+3) (0+1) (0+0) (0+0) (0+0)	Norway; Ole Einar Bjørndalen; Lars Helge Birkeland; Johannes Thingnes Bø; Erlend Bjøntegaard	1:13:05.7 (0+2) (0+1) (0+0) (0+0) (0+0) (0+0) (0+2) (0+2)

=== Women ===
Event:	Gold:	Time	Silver:	Time	Bronze:	Time
7.5 km Sprint details	Olga Podchufarova; Russia	21:01.9 (0+0)	Dorothea Wierer; Italy	21:09.9 (0+1)	Ekaterina Yurlova; Russia	21:24.0 (0+0)
10 km Pursuit details	Ekaterina Yurlova; Russia	30:07.3 (1+0+0+0)	Selina Gasparin; Switzerland	30:19.3 (1+0+0+0)	Dorothea Wierer; Italy	30:25.3 (0+0+2+1)
4x6 km Relay details	France; Justine Braisaz; Anaïs Bescond; Anaïs Chevalier; Marie Dorin-Habert	1:07:53.5 (0+2) (0+1) (0+1) (0+3) (0+0) (0+1) (0+0) (0+0)	Czech Republic; Eva Puskarčíková; Lucie Charvátová; Gabriela Soukalová; Veronika Vítková	1:08:10.7 (0+0) (0+1) (0+0) (2+3) (0+1) (0+0) (0+2) (0+0)	Russia; Ekaterina Shumilova; Anastasia Zagoruiko; Ekaterina Yurlova; Olga Podchufarova	1:08:14.6 (0+1) (0+2) (0+2) (0+2) (0+2) (0+0) (0+0) (0+1)
