= 2015–16 Biathlon World Cup – World Cup 8 =

The 2015–16 Biathlon World Cup – World Cup 8 was held in Presque Isle, Maine, United States, from 11 February until 13 February 2016.

== Schedule of events ==
Date	Time	Events
February 11	16:30 CET	Men's 10 km Sprint
February 11	18:40 CET	Women's 7.5 km Sprint
February 12	17:30 CET	Men's 12.5 km Pursuit
February 12	19:10 CET	Women's 10 km Pursuit
February 13	20:20 CET	Men's 4x7.5 km Relay
February 13	22:10 CET	Women's 4x6 km Relay

== Medal winners ==
=== Men ===
Event:	Gold:	Time	Silver:	Time	Bronze:	Time
10 km Sprint details	Johannes Thingnes Bø; Norway	24:38.8 (0+0)	Anton Shipulin; Russia	25:06.7 (0+0)	Martin Fourcade; France	25:07.7 (0+1)
12.5 km Pursuit details	Martin Fourcade; France	31:04.4 (1+1+0+0)	Johannes Thingnes Bø; Norway	31:29.2 (1+0+0+2)	Anton Shipulin; Russia	32:15.9 (1+0+0+1)
4x7.5 km Relay details	Norway; Lars Helge Birkeland; Erlend Bjøntegaard; Johannes Thingnes Bø; Tarjei Bø	1:12:09.8 (0+3) (0+0) (0+0) (0+0) (0+2) (0+1) (0+0) (0+1)	France; Simon Fourcade; Quentin Fillon Maillet; Simon Desthieux; Jean-Guillaume Béatrix	1:12:39.9 (0+0) (0+1) (0+1) (0+0) (0+0) (0+0) (0+0) (0+0)	Germany; Erik Lesser; Andreas Birnbacher; Daniel Böhm; Benedikt Doll	1:12:52.4 (0+0) (0+0) (0+3) (0+2) (0+3) (0+1) (0+1) (0+1)

=== Women ===
Event:	Gold:	Time	Silver:	Time	Bronze:	Time
7.5 km Sprint details	Gabriela Soukalová; Czech Republic	20:02.2 (0+0)	Susan Dunklee; United States	20:20.0 (0+0)	Krystyna Guzik; Poland	20:21.3 (0+0)
10 km Pursuit details	Gabriela Soukalová; Czech Republic	31:24.6 (0+0+3+0)	Kaisa Mäkäräinen; Finland	31:58.6 (0+1+2+0)	Marie Dorin Habert; France	32:03.4 (1+0+4+0)
4x6 km Relay details	Czech Republic; Eva Puskarčíková; Lucie Charvátová; Gabriela Soukalová; Veronika Vítková	1:07:11.0 (0+2) (0+0) (0+2) (1+3) (0+0) (0+2) (0+2) (0+3)	Ukraine; Iryna Varvynets; Natalya Burdyga; Julija Dzhyma; Olena Pidhrushna	1:07:36.2 (0+1) (0+1) (0+3) (0+1) (0+1) (0+0) (0+2) (0+3)	Germany; Franziska Preuss; Luise Kummer; Miriam Gössner; Karolin Horchler	1:07:36.4 (0+0) (0+1) (0+0) (0+1) (0+1) (1+3) (0+1) (0+0)
