= 2015–16 Biathlon World Cup – World Cup 4 =

The 2015–16 Biathlon World Cup – World Cup 4 was held in Ruhpolding, Germany, from 8 January until 10 January 2016. It had been scheduled to be held in Oberhof, but due to lack of snow it was relocated in Ruhpolding.

== Schedule of events ==
Date	Time	Events
January 8	11:45 CET	Men's 10 km Sprint
January 8	14:30 CET	Women's 7.5 km Sprint
January 9	12:45 CET	Men's 12.5 km Pursuit
January 9	15:15 CET	Women's 10 km Pursuit
January 10	12:15 CET	Men 15 km Mass Start
January 10	14:45 CET	Women 12.5 km Mass Start

== Medal winners ==
=== Men ===
Event:	Gold:	Time	Silver:	Time	Bronze:	Time
10 km Sprint details	Johannes Thingnes Bø; Norway	21:57.5 (0+0)	Tarjei Bø; Norway	22:00.5 (0+0)	Emil Hegle Svendsen; Norway	22:05.1 (0+0)
12.5 km Pursuit details	Simon Eder; Austria	33:19.1 (1+0+0+0)	Martin Fourcade; France	33:23.3 (0+0+1+1)	Michal Šlesingr; Czech Republic	33:24.2 (0+0+0+0)
15 km Mass Start details	Martin Fourcade; France	34:07.2 (0+1+0+0)	Ondřej Moravec; Czech Republic	34:20.9 (0+0+0+0)	Tarjei Bø; Norway	34:36.9 (2+0+1+0)

=== Women ===
Event:	Gold:	Time	Silver:	Time	Bronze:	Time
7.5 km Sprint details	Franziska Hildebrand; Germany	19:46.5 (0+0)	Gabriela Soukalová; Czech Republic	19:46.8 (0+0)	Kaisa Mäkäräinen; Finland	19:48.8 (0+0)
10 km Pursuit details	Laura Dahlmeier; Germany	32:35.9 (0+0+1+0)	Gabriela Soukalová; Czech Republic	32:43.2 (0+0+0+1)	Dorothea Wierer; Italy	33:29.5 (0+1+0+1)
12.5 km Mass Start details	Laura Dahlmeier; Germany	33:17.7 (0+0+0+0)	Marie Dorin Habert; France	33:33.0 (1+0+0+0)	Tiril Eckhoff; Norway	33:39.6 (0+0+1+1)
