= 2015–16 Biathlon World Cup – World Cup 5 =

The 2015–16 Biathlon World Cup – World Cup 5 was held in Ruhpolding, Germany, from 13 January until 17 January 2016.

== Schedule of events ==
Date	Time	Events
January 13	14:15 CET	Men's 20 km Individual
January 14	14:15 CET	Women's 15 km Individual
January 15	15:30 CET	Men's 4x7.5 km Relay
January 16	11:45 CET	Women 12.5 km Mass Start
January 16	16:10 CET	Men 15 km Mass Start
January 17	11:00 CET	Women's 4x6 km Relay

== Medal winners ==
=== Men ===
Event:	Gold:	Time	Silver:	Time	Bronze:	Time
20 km Individual details	Martin Fourcade; France	50:53.9 (0+0+1+0)	Simon Eder; Austria	51:11.4 (0+0+0+1)	Anton Shipulin; Russia	51:22.8 (0+0+1+0)
15 km Mass Start details	Erik Lesser; Germany	40:29.3 (0+0+0+0)	Martin Fourcade; France	40:39.1 (0+0+0+1)	Evgeniy Garanichev; Russia	40:42.4 (0+0+0+1)
4x7.5 km Relay details	Norway; Ole Einar Bjørndalen; Johannes Thingnes Bø; Tarjei Bø; Emil Hegle Svendsen	1:17:05.0 (0+3) (0+2) (0+0) (0+0) (0+3) (0+1) (0+1) (0+2)	Russia; Alexey Volkov; Evgeniy Garanichev; Maxim Tsvetkov; Anton Shipulin	1:17:19.6 (0+0) (0+1) (0+0) (0+2) (0+1) (0+2) (0+0) (0+0)	Austria; Sven Grossegger; Julian Eberhard; Simon Eder; Dominik Landertinger	1:17:40.8 (0+0) (0+2) (1+3) (0+0) (0+0) (0+0) (0+0) (0+2)

=== Women ===
Event:	Gold:	Time	Silver:	Time	Bronze:	Time
15 km Individual details	Dorothea Wierer; Italy	40:19.9 (0+0+0+0)	Kaisa Mäkäräinen; Finland	41:14.7 (1+0+0+0)	Gabriela Soukalová; Czech Republic	41:29.8 (0+1+0+0)
12.5 km Mass Start details	Gabriela Soukalová; Czech Republic	41:13.2 (0+0+0+0)	Franziska Hildebrand; Germany	41:27.1 (0+0+0+1)	Laura Dahlmeier; Germany	41:37.6 (0+1+0+1)
4x6 km Relay details	Ukraine; Iryna Varvynets; Juliya Dzhyma; Valj Semerenko; Olena Pidhrushna	1:16:14.2 (0+0) (0+0) (0+0) (0+0) (1+3) (0+1) (0+0) (0+0)	Germany; Karolin Horchler; Miriam Gössner; Maren Hammerschmidt; Laura Dahlmeier	1:16:15.4 (0+1) (0+1) (2+3) (0+2) (0+2) (0+1) (0+0) (0+1)	Italy; Lisa Vittozzi; Karin Oberhofer; Alexia Runggaldier; Dorothea Wierer	1:16:58.0 (0+1) (0+2) (0+0) (0+3) (0+1) (0+2) (0+0) (0+1)
