= Olga Podchufarova =

Russian biathlete

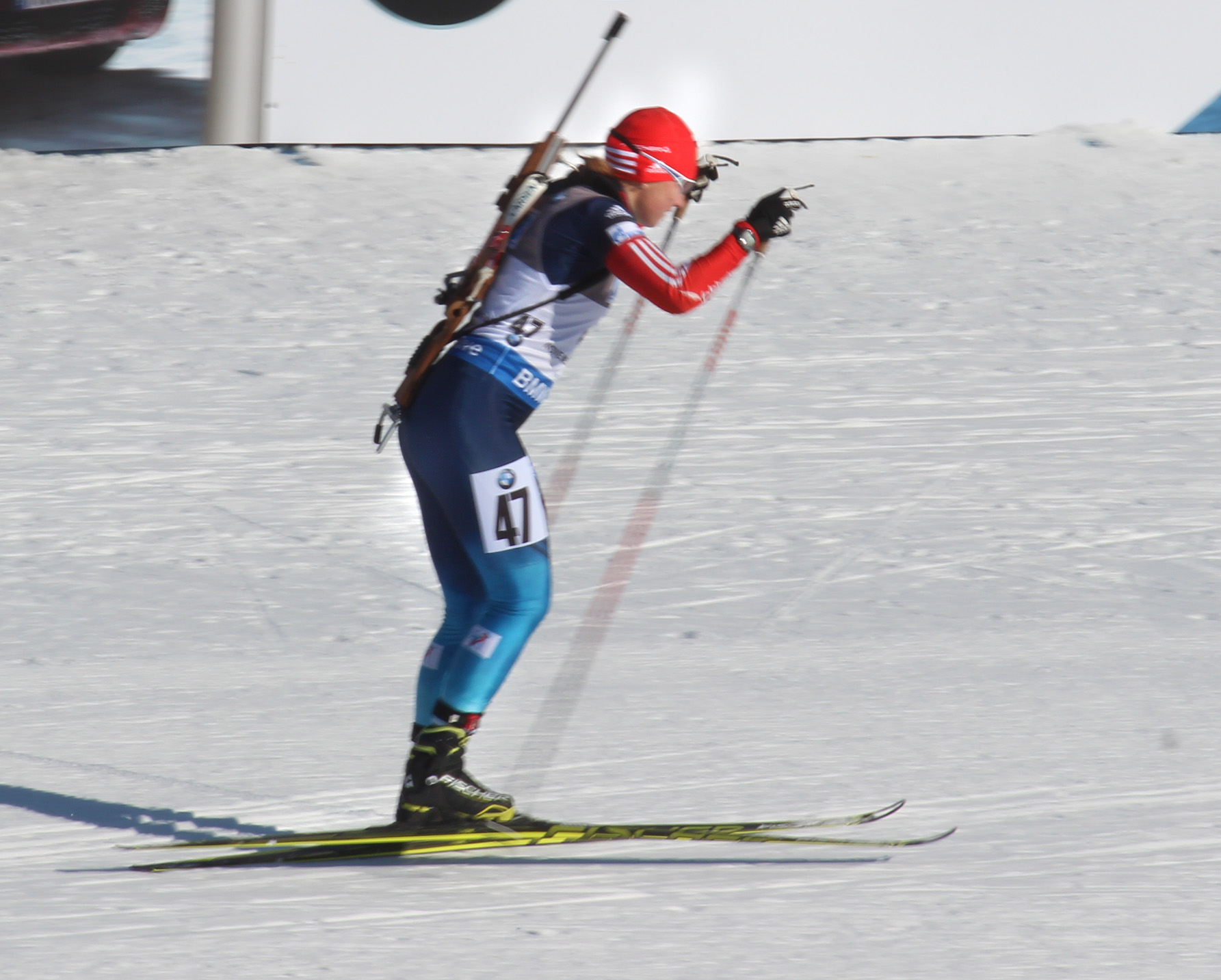
- Podchufarova in WC 2015 Nove Mesto

Personal information
- Native name: Ольга Владимировна Подчуфарова
- Full name: Olga Vladimirovna Podchufarova
- Nationality: Russian
- Born: 5 August 1992 (age 33) Moscow, Russia

Sport

Professional information
- Club: Yunost Moskvy
- World Cup debut: 9 March 2013

World Championships
- Teams: 1 (2017)
- Medals: 1

World Cup
- Seasons: 5 (2012/13–)
- Individual races: 77
- All races: 64
- Individual victories: 1
- Individual podiums: 2
- All podiums: 3
Medal record
World Championships
Bronze medal – third place	2017 Hochfilzen	Mixed relay
Junior World Championships
Gold medal – first place	2013 Obertilliach	10 km pursuit
Silver medal – second place	2013 Obertillich	7.5 km sprint
Bronze medal – third place	2013 Obertillich	3 x 6 km relay

Olga Vladimirovna Podchufarova (Russian: О́льга Влади́мировна Подчуфарова; born 5 August 1992) is a retired Russian biathlete. She competed at the 2014 Winter Olympics in Sochi, where she placed 49th in the individual competition.

== Results ==
=== Olympic Games ===
Event	Individual	Sprint	Pursuit	Mass start	Relay	Mixed relay
(Russia) 2014 Sochi	49th	—	—	—	—	—

=== World Championships ===
Event	Individual	Sprint	Pursuit	Mass start	Relay	Mixed relay
(Finland) 2015 Kontiolahti	49th	45th	27th	—	—	10th
(Norway) 2016 Oslo	—	65th	—	—	—	—
(Austria) 2017 Hochfilzen	26th	—	—	—	10th	Bronze

=== Biathlon World Cup ===
Season	Overall			Individual			Sprint			Pursuit			Mass start		
Season	Races	Points	Position	Races	Points	Position	Races	Points	Position	Races	Points	Position	Races	Points	Position
2012–13	3/26	26	74th	0/3	—	—	2/10	11	73rd	1/8	15	65th	0/5	—	—
2013–14	7/22	70	57th	1/2	—	—	4/9	30	59th	3/8	53	40th	0/3	—	—
2014–15	17/25	323	25th	3/3	30	32nd	7/10	152	22nd	6/7	120	23rd	1/5	21	37th

=== World Cup Highlights ===
2015, Slovenia, Pokljuka, (bronze) 3rd at mass start
2016, Italy, Antholz-Anterselva, (gold) 1st at sprint
