= 2015–16 Biathlon World Cup – World Cup 1 =

The 2015–16 Biathlon World Cup – World Cup 1 was the opening event of the season and was held in Östersund, Sweden, from 29 November until 6 December 2015.

== Schedule of events ==
Date	Time	Events
November 29	13:45 CET	Single Mixed Relay
November 29	15:30 CET	Mixed Relay
December 2	17:15 CET	Men's 20 km Individual
December 3	17:15 CET	Women's 15 km Individual
December 5	12:30 CET	Men's 10 km Sprint
December 5	15:30 CET	Women's 7.5 km Sprint
December 6	11:00 CET	Men's 12.5 km Pursuit
December 6	13:30 CET	Women's 10 km Pursuit

== Medal winners ==
=== Men ===
Event:	Gold:	Time	Silver:	Time	Bronze:	Time
20 km Individual details	Ole Einar Bjørndalen; Norway	50:14.5 (0+0+0+0)	Simon Schempp; Germany	50:41.6 (0+0+1+0)	Alexey Volkov; Russia	50:52.7 (0+0+0+0)
10 km Sprint details	Martin Fourcade; France	24:02.0 (1+1)	Arnd Peiffer; Germany	24:53.6 (0+1)	Ole Einar Bjørndalen; Norway	24:57.2 (1+1)
12.5 km Pursuit details	Martin Fourcade; France	31:22.4 (1+0+1+1)	Arnd Peiffer; Germany	31:57.5 (0+1+0+0)	Quentin Fillon Maillet; France	32:17.6 (0+0+1+1)

=== Women ===
Event:	Gold:	Time	Silver:	Time	Bronze:	Time
15 km Individual details	Dorothea Wierer; Italy	42:17.0 (0+0+0+0)	Marie Dorin-Habert; France	42:31.1 (0+2+0+0)	Olena Pidhrushna; Ukraine	42:54.8 (0+0+0+0)
7.5 km Sprint details	Gabriela Soukalová; Czech Republic	19:46.2 (0+0)	Federica Sanfilippo; Italy	20:01.2 (0+0)	Olena Pidhrushna; Ukraine	20:24.6 (1+0)
10 km Pursuit details	Kaisa Mäkäräinen; Finland	30:45.1 (1+0+1+0)	Dorothea Wierer; Italy	30:47.0 (0+0+1+0)	Franziska Hildebrand; Germany	30:48.4 (0+0+0+0)

=== Mixed ===
Event:	Gold:	Time	Silver:	Time	Bronze:	Time
Single Mixed Relay details	Norway; Kaia Wøien Nicolaisen; Lars Helge Birkeland	36:27.3 (0+0) (0+0) (0+1) (0+1) (0+1) (1+3) (0+1) (0+0)	Canada; Rosanna Crawford; Nathan Smith	36:39.2 (0+2) (0+2) (0+3) (0+0) (0+0) (0+0) (0+0) (0+2)	Germany; Maren Hammerschmidt; Daniel Böhm	36:40.5 (0+0) (0+3) (0+1) (0+1) (0+0) (1+3) (0+0) (0+0)
2 x 6 km + 2 x 7.5 km Relay details	Norway; Fanny Horn Birkeland; Tiril Eckhoff; Johannes Thingnes Bø; Tarjei Bø	1:11:42.6 (0+1) (0+1) (0+2) (0+2) (0+0) (0+3) (0+0) (0+0)	Germany; Franziska Hildebrand; Vanessa Hinz; Benedikt Doll; Simon Schempp	1:12:16.2 (0+1) (0+0) (0+2) (0+1) (0+1) (0+0) (0+0) (0+2)	Czech Republic; Veronika Vítková; Gabriela Soukalová; Michal Šlesingr; Ondřej Moravec	1:12:54.1 (0+3) (0+0) (0+0) (0+2) (0+1) (0+2) (0+1) (0+2)

== Achievements ==
Best performance for all time

- Sean Doherty (USA), 17th place in Individual
- Anton Babikov (RUS), 18th place in Individual
- Dmitriy Dyuzhev (BLR), 25th place in Individual
- George Buta (ROU), 33rd place in Individual
- Dimitar Gerdzhikov (BUL), 55th place in Individual
- Martin Remmelg (EST), 56th place in Individual
- Dimitar Partalov (BUL), 64th place in Individual
- Rafał Penar (POL), 80th place in Individual
- Daumants Lūsa (LAT), 83rd place in Individual
- Dorothea Wierer (ITA), 1st place in Individual
- Federica Sanfilippo (ITA), 2nd place in Sprint
- Lisa Hauser (AUT), 8th place in Individual
- Darya Usanova (KAZ), 15th place in Individual
- Linn Persson (SWE), 29th place in Individual
- Johanna Talihärm (EST), 31st place in Individual
- Anna Magnusson (SWE), 40th place in Individual
- Annukka Siltakorpi (FIN), 61st place in Individual

First World Cup race

- Miha Dovžan (SLO), 47th place in Individual
- Sergey Bocharnikov (BLR), 87th place in Individual
- Denis Serban (ROU), 96th place in Individual
- Kristina Ilchenko (BLR), 69th place in Individual
- Meril Beilmann (EST), 79th place in Individual

Oldest winner of a biathlon world cup race in history

- Ole Einar Bjørndalen (NOR), 41 years and 309 days
