= 2015–16 Biathlon World Cup – World Cup 9 =

The 2015–16 Biathlon World Cup – World Cup 9 was held in Khanty-Mansiysk, Russia, from 17 March until 20 March 2016. Due to strong winds on the final day of competition, which caused a light pole to collapse onto the shooting range, the men's and women's mass start events were cancelled.

== Schedule of events ==
Date	Time	Events
March 17	14:15 CET	Women's 7.5 km Sprint
March 18	14:15 CET	Men's 10 km Sprint
March 19	12:45 CET	Women's 10 km Pursuit
March 19	14:30 CET	Men's 12.5 km Pursuit
March 20	10:20 CET	Women 12.5 km Mass Start
March 20	13:00 CET	Men 15 km Mass Start

== Medal winners ==
=== Men ===
Event:	Gold:	Time	Silver:	Time	Bronze:	Time
10 km Sprint details	Julian Eberhard; Austria	24:18.6 (0+0)	Simon Schempp; Germany	24:19.7 (0+0)	Arnd Peiffer; Germany	24:41.6 (0+0)
12.5 km Pursuit details	Simon Schempp; Germany	33:27.8 (1+1+0+1)	Johannes Thingnes Bø; Norway	33:36.3 (0+0+0+1)	Erik Lesser; Germany	33:43.5 (0+0+1+1)
15 km Mass Start; Cancelled	n/a	n/a	n/a	n/a	n/a	n/a

=== Women ===
Event:	Gold:	Time	Silver:	Time	Bronze:	Time
7.5 km Sprint details	Kaisa Mäkäräinen; Finland	20:42.3 (0+1)	Gabriela Soukalová; Czech Republic	20:45.4 (0+0)	Marte Olsbu; Norway	20:47.1 (0+0)
10 km Pursuit details	Kaisa Mäkäräinen; Finland	30:06.7 (1+0+1+0)	Marie Dorin Habert; France	30:08.2 (0+0+0+1)	Dorothea Wierer; Italy	30:12.4 (0+0+1+0)
12.5 km Mass Start; Cancelled	n/a	n/a	n/a	n/a	n/a	n/a

== Achievements ==
Best performance for all time

- Julian Eberhard (AUT), 1st place in Sprint
- Marte Olsbu (NOR), 3rd place in Sprint
- Justine Braisaz (FRA), 4th place in Sprint
- Tatiana Akimova (RUS), 12th place in Sprint
