= 2015–16 Biathlon World Cup – World Cup 2 =

The 2015–16 Biathlon World Cup – World Cup 2 was held in Hochfilzen, Austria, from 11 December until 13 December 2015.

== Schedule of events ==
| Date | Time | Events |
|---|---|---|
| December 11 | 11:30 CET | Women's 7.5 km Sprint |
| December 11 | 14:30 CET | Men's 10 km Sprint |
| December 12 | 11:30 CET | Women's 10 km Pursuit |
| December 12 | 13:30 CET | Men's 12.5 km Pursuit |
| December 13 | 11:15 CET | Women's 4x6 km Relay |
| December 13 | 14:30 CET | Men's 4x7.5 km Relay |

== Medal winners ==
=== Men ===
| Event: | Gold: | Time | Silver: | Time | Bronze: | Time |
|---|---|---|---|---|---|---|
| 10 km Sprint details | Simon Schempp; Germany | 23:52.3 (0+0) | Martin Fourcade; France | 24:02.2 (1+0) | Tarjei Bø; Norway | 24:11.2 (0+0) |
| 12.5 km Pursuit details | Martin Fourcade; France | 31:19.9 (0+2+0+0) | Simon Schempp; Germany | 31:28.8 (0+0+1+0) | Anton Shipulin; Russia | 31:39.0 (0+0+2+0) |
| 4x7.5 km Relay details | Russia; Alexey Volkov; Evgeniy Garanichev; Dmitry Malyshko; Anton Shipulin | 1:11:40.8 (0+0) (0+1) (0+0) (0+0) (0+2) (0+1) (0+0) (0+2) | Norway; Henrik L'Abée-Lund; Johannes Thingnes Bø; Tarjei Bø; Emil Hegle Svendsen | 1:11:43.9 (0+0) (0+2) (0+0) (0+2) (0+0) (0+1) (0+0) (0+2) | France; Simon Fourcade; Quentin Fillon Maillet; Simon Desthieux; Martin Fourcade | 1:12:42.7 (0+1) (0+0) (0+0) (0+3) (0+0) (0+1) (0+1) (0+0) |

=== Women ===
| Event: | Gold: | Time | Silver: | Time | Bronze: | Time |
|---|---|---|---|---|---|---|
| 7.5 km Sprint details | Franziska Hildebrand; Germany | 20:04.1 (0+0) | Maren Hammerschmidt; Germany | 20:19.2 (0+0) | Miriam Gössner; Germany | 20:25.1 (0+1) |
| 10 km Pursuit details | Laura Dahlmeier; Germany | 28:23.3 (0+0+0+1) | Maren Hammerschmidt; Germany | 28:36.6 (0+0+1+1) | Gabriela Soukalová; Czech Republic | 28:41.8 (0+0+0+1) |
| 4x6 km Relay details | Italy; Lisa Vittozzi; Karin Oberhofer; Federica Sanfilippo; Dorothea Wierer | 1:05:32.6 (0+0) (0+0) (0+0) (0+1) (0+3) (0+2) (0+1) (0+1) | Germany; Franziska Hildebrand; Maren Hammerschmidt; Vanessa Hinz; Franziska Preuß | 1:05:32.8 (0+0) (0+2) (0+1) (0+1) (0+0) (0+1) (0+1) (0+1) | Ukraine; Juliya Dzhyma; Olga Abramova; Valj Semerenko; Olena Pidhrushna | 1:05:45.7 (0+1) (0+0) (0+1) (0+2) (0+2) (0+1) (0+2) (0+1) |

== Achievements ==
Best performance for all time

First World Cup race
