= Daniel Böhm =

German biathlete (born 1986)

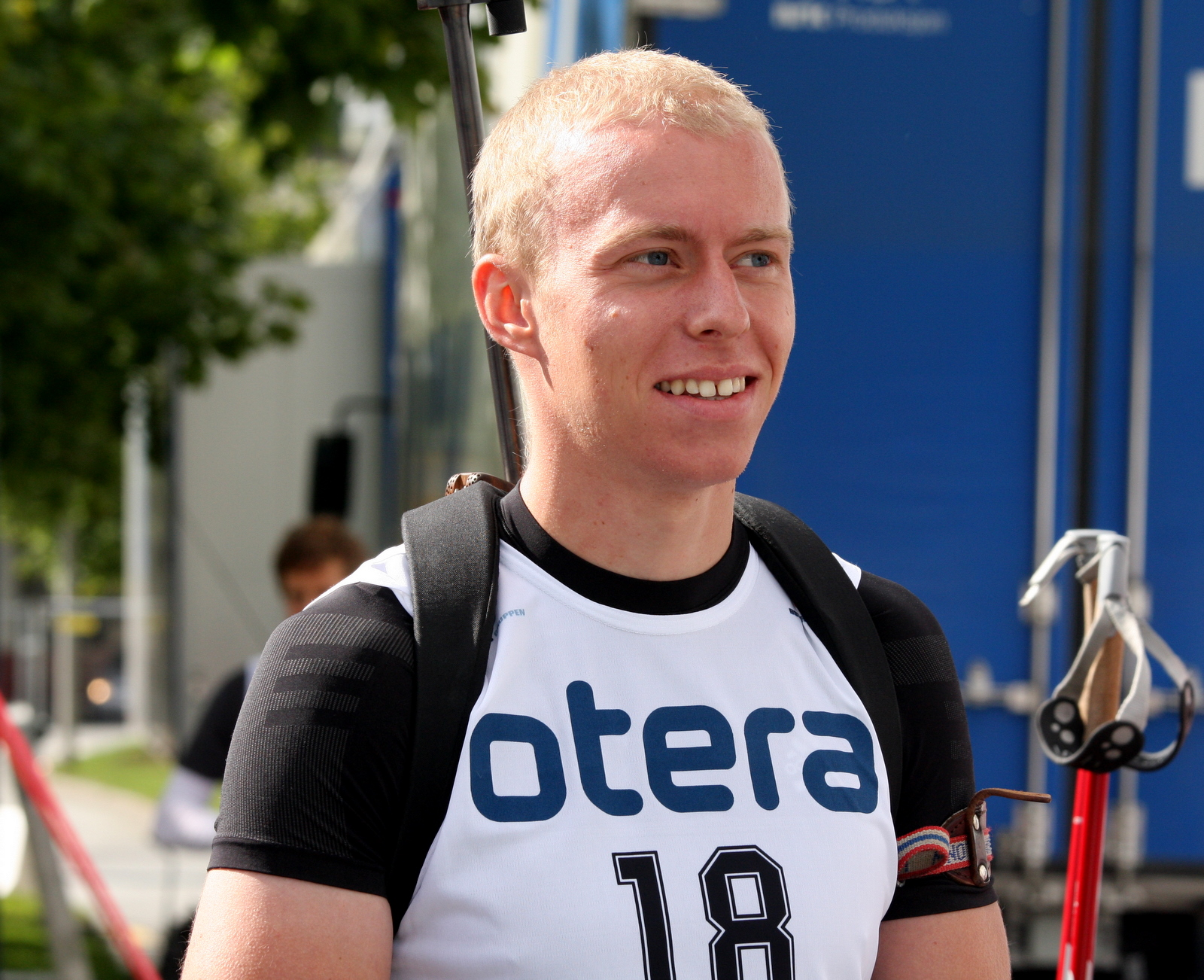

Personal information
- Nationality: German
- Born: 16 June 1986 (age 40) Clausthal-Zellerfeld, West Germany

Sport
- Country: Germany
- Sport: Biathlon
Medal record
Men's biathlon
Event	1st	2nd	3rd
Olympic Games (1 medal)	1	0	0
World Championships (1 medal)	1	0	0
Total (2 medals)	2	0	0
Olympic Games
Gold medal – first place	2014 Sochi	4 × 7.5 km relay
World Championships
Gold medal – first place	2015 Kontiolahti	4 × 7.5 km relay
Junior World Championships
Gold medal – first place	2007 Martell	4 × 7.5 km relay
Silver medal – second place	2007 Martell	10 km sprint
Silver medal – second place	2007 Martell	12.5 km pursuit
Bronze medal – third place	2006 Presque Isle	4 × 7.5 km relay
- Updated on 01 December 2015

Daniel Böhm (also spelled Boehm, born 16 June 1986 in Clausthal-Zellerfeld) is a former German biathlete. In 2009, he completed his first single World Cup Race.

== Career highlights ==
World Cup
2009, Vancouver-Whistler, (bronze) 3rd at team relay (with Schempp / Peiffer / Rösch)
2009, Vancouver-Whistler, (silver) 2nd at 20 km individual
