= 2020–21 Biathlon World Cup – Pursuit Women =

The 2020–21 Biathlon World Cup – Pursuit Women started on 6 December 2020 in Kontiolahti and will finished on 20 March 2021 in Östersund

== Competition format ==
The 10 kilometres (6.2 mi) pursuit race is skied over five laps. The biathlete shoots four times at any shooting lane, in the order of prone, prone, standing, standing, totalling 20 targets. For each missed target a biathlete has to run a 150 metres (490 ft) penalty loop. Competitors' starts are staggered, according to the result of the previous sprint race.

== 2019–20 Top 3 standings ==
Medal	Athlete	Points
Gold:	Tiril Eckhoff (NOR)	232
Silver:	Dorothea Wierer (ITA)	186
Bronze:	Ingrid Landmark Tandrevold (NOR)	185

== Medal winners ==
Event	Gold	Time	Silver	Time	Bronze	Time
Kontiolahti (2) details	Tiril Eckhoff; Norway	31:05.9 (0+0+0+0)	Marte Olsbu Røiseland; Norway	31:27.4 (0+0+1+1)	Hanna Öberg; Sweden	31:41.3 (0+1+1+1)
Hochfilzen details	Marte Olsbu Røiseland; Norway	29:04.6 (1+0+0+1)	Dzinara Alimbekava; Belarus	29:18.5 (0+0+0+0)	Julia Simon; France	29:22.4 (2+1+0+0)
Hochfilzen (2) details	Tiril Eckhoff; Norway	28:24.8 (0+1+0+0)	Hanna Öberg; Sweden	28:47.3 (1+0+1+0)	Elvira Öberg; Sweden	28:52.4 (1+0+0+1)
Oberhof details	Tiril Eckhoff; Norway	32:20.9 (0+1+0+1)	Marte Olsbu Røiseland; Norway	32:21.4 (0+0+0+0)	Lisa Theresa Hauser; Austria	33:03.9 (0+0+0+1)
World Championships details	Tiril Eckhoff; Norway	30:38.1 (1+0+1+0)	Lisa Theresa Hauser; Austria	30:55.4 (1+0+0+0)	Anaïs Chevalier-Bouchet; France	31:11.1 (0+1+0+1)
Nové Město details	Tiril Eckhoff; Norway	27:28.0 (0+0+1+2)	Denise Herrmann; Germany	27:52.0 (1+0+0+0)	Marte Olsbu Røiseland; Norway	27:57.9 (0+1+1+1)
Nové Město (2) details	Tiril Eckhoff; Norway	27:13.6 (0+1+0+0)	Dzinara Alimbekava; Belarus	27:48.2 (0+0+0+0)	Franziska Preuß; Germany	27:53.8 (0+1+0+1)
Östersund details	Marte Olsbu Røiseland; Norway	32:54.8 (0+0+2+2)	Tiril Eckhoff; Norway	33:24.1 (1+2+0+1)	Hanna Sola; Belarus	33:38.8 (0+1+3+1)

== Standings ==
6 of 8 competitions scored

#	Name	KON 2	HOC	HOC 2	OBH	POK	NME	NME 2	OST	Total
1	Tiril Eckhoff (NOR)	60	~~24~~	60	60	60	60	60	~~54~~	360
2	Marte Olsbu Røiseland (NOR)	54	60	~~36~~	54	~~32~~	48	43	60	319
3	Franziska Preuß (GER)	36	~~34~~	38	~~23~~	40	40	48	38	240
4	Hanna Öberg (SWE)	48	43	54	34	28	28	~~14~~	0	235
5	Dzinara Alimbekava (BLR)	43	54	30	25	20	~~15~~	54	~~14~~	226
6	Lisa Theresa Hauser (AUT)	26	31	29	48	54	0	36	~~20~~	224
7	Dorothea Wierer (ITA)	~~21~~	38	40	36	43	~~7~~	40	23	220
8	Elvira Öberg (SWE)	34	36	48	28	27	–	~~25~~	25	198
9	Denise Herrmann (GER)	30	16	32	~~9~~	34	54	31	~~13~~	197
10	Julia Simon (FRA)	24	48	27	26	~~19~~	~~22~~	24	43	192
11	Anaïs Chevalier-Bouchet (FRA)	20	19	~~13~~	40	48	31	32	~~9~~	190
12	Ingrid Landmark Tandrevold (NOR)	38	22	43	–	31	29	~~17~~	18	181
13	Linn Persson (SWE)	~~17~~	~~2~~	34	31	22	43	21	17	168
14	Markéta Davidová (CZE)	19	32	21	29	~~9~~	24	38	–	163
15	Justine Braisaz-Bouchet (FRA)	31	25	26	30	~~11~~	21	30	~~5~~	163
16	Hanna Sola (BLR)	12	0	25	~~1~~	15	36	19	48	155
17	Dunja Zdouc (AUT)	13	~~11~~	~~10~~	15	30	23	28	27	136
18	Vanessa Hinz (GER)	23	–	0	20	38	30	–	22	133
19	Karoline Offigstad Knotten (NOR)	10	40	22	19	0	–	6	28	125
20	Yuliia Dzhima (UKR)	–	0	18	27	16	38	26	DNS	125
21	Lena Häcki (SUI)	22	30	0	12	29	–	–	30	123
22	Anaïs Bescond (FRA)	14	21	~~4~~	21	5	34	23	0	118
23	Emma Lunder (CAN)	32	15	31	18	21	–	–	0	117
24	Darya Blashko (UKR)	29	23	0	DNS	17	25	16	4	114
25	Svetlana Mironova (RUS)	27	–	0	43	–	27	0	7	104
26	Uliana Kaisheva (RUS)	0	14	0	22	12	20	0	34	102
27	Elena Kruchinkina (BLR)	11	0	14	32	0	–	13	32	102
28	Monika Hojnisz-Staręga (POL)	0	–	11	38	25	–	22	–	96
29	Janina Hettich (GER)	9	17	19	13	7	DNF	~~1~~	29	94
30	Ida Lien (NOR)	–	7	–	11	24	16	29	DNS	87
#	Name	KON 2	HOC	HOC 2	OBH	POK	NME	NME 2	OST	Total
31	Lisa Vittozzi (ITA)	0	26	28	–	0	14	0	15	83
32	Selina Gasparin (SUI)	–	4	2	24	26	19	7	–	82
33	Irina Kazakevich (RUS)	25	27	–	4	18	5	–	–	79
34	Julia Schwaiger (AUT)	16	–	17	–	–	10	27	6	76
35	Iryna Kryuko (BLR)	–	29	DNF	–	–	–	20	21	70
36	Larisa Kuklina (RUS)	–	18	–	16	–	0	4	31	69
37	Evgeniya Pavlova (RUS)	28	0	8	10	1	18	–	0	65
38	Susan Dunklee (USA)	15	0	0	–	14	–	34	–	63
39	Baiba Bendika (LAT)	–	0	–	14	23	2	18	–	57
40	Johanna Skottheim (SWE)	40	9	6	0	–	–	–	–	55
41	Clare Egan (USA)	0	28	23	3	0	–	0	0	54
42	Mona Brorsson (SWE)	18	12	–	–	0	0	0	24	54
43	Chloé Chevalier (FRA)	0	–	24	6	–	0	10	12	52
44	Milena Todorova (BUL)	0	8	0	17	0	–	0	26	51
45	Olena Pidhrushna (UKR)	0	–	–	2	36	0	–	11	49
46	Paulína Fialková (SVK)	–	–	–	–	0	32	3	8	43
47	Emilie Kalkenberg (NOR)	2	0	–	–	–	–	–	40	42
48	Mari Eder (FIN)	–	20	–	7	10	4	0	–	41
49	Ivona Fialková (SVK)	–	0	0	0	–	1	–	36	37
50	Lucie Charvátová (CZE)	0	DNF	–	–	–	26	11	–	37
51	Elisa Gasparin (SUI)	6	–	9	0	13	0	8	0	36
52	Johanna Talihärm (EST)	0	–	–	0	8	17	–	3	28
53	Eva Puskarčíková (CZE)	–	–	15	0	–	0	12	–	27
54	Maren Hammerschmidt (GER)	7	3	5	–	–	11	0	–	26
55	Anna Weidel (GER)	–	–	20	5	–	–	0	0	25
56	Irene Cadurisch (SUI)	–	6	–	8	–	9	–	0	23
57	Lou Jeanmonnot (FRA)	–	–	–	–	–	6	15	0	21
58	Aita Gasparin (SUI)	5	–	0	0	6	0	0	10	21
59	Stina Nilsson (SWE)	–	–	–	–	–	–	–	19	19
60	Suvi Minkkinen (FIN)	–	0	16	–	–	0	2	1	19
#	Name	KON 2	HOC	HOC 2	OBH	POK	NME	NME 2	OST	Total
61	Caroline Colombo (FRA)	8	10	1	0	–	–	–	–	19
62	Fuyuko Tachizaki (JPN)	4	13	0	–	0	–	0	–	17
63	Vanessa Voigt (GER)	–	–	–	–	–	–	–	15	15
64	Alina Stremous (MDA)	–	–	–	–	0	13	–	–	13
65	Tatiana Akimova (RUS)	–	–	12	–	–	–	0	0	12
66	Anastasiya Merkushyna (UKR)	–	–	0	–	–	12	0	–	12
67	Anna Magnusson (SWE)	0	–	0	–	–	–	9	0	9
68	Valentyna Semerenko (UKR)	DNF	DNS	DNS	–	DNF	8	–	0	8
69	Tuuli Tomingas (EST)	0	–	7	–	0	–	–	–	7
70	Lotte Lie (BEL)	–	0	–	–	0	0	5	0	5
71	Joanne Reid (USA)	–	5	–	0	0	–	–	–	5
72	Katharina Innerhofer (AUT)	0	1	0	–	4	–	–	–	5
73	Kamila Żuk (POL)	1	0	–	0	0	3	0	–	4
74	Jessica Jislová (CZE)	3	–	0	–	–	0	0	–	3
75	Sarah Beaudry (CAN)	–	0	3	LAP	–	–	–	–	3
76	Michela Carrara (ITA)	–	–	–	–	3	0	–	–	3
77	Yelizaveta Belchenko (KAZ)	–	–	–	0	2	–	–		2
78	Karoline Erdal (NOR)	–	–	–	–	–	–	–	2	2
