= Biathlon World Championships 2020 – Women's pursuit =

Women's pursuit at the Biathlon World Championships 2020
- Venue: South Tyrol Arena
- Location: Antholz-Anterselva, Italy
- Dates: 16 February
- Competitors: 59 from 25 nations
- Winning time: 29:22.0

Medalists
gold medal	Dorothea Wierer	Italy
silver medal	Denise Herrmann	Germany
bronze medal	Marte Olsbu Røiseland	Norway

The Women's pursuit competition at the Biathlon World Championships 2020 was held on 16 February 2020.

== Results ==
The race was started at 13:00.

Rank	Bib	Name	Nationality	Start	Penalties (P+P+S+S)	Time	Deficit
1st place, gold medalist(s)	7	Dorothea Wierer	Italy	0:39	1 (0+0+0+1)	29:22.0	
2nd place, silver medalist(s)	5	Denise Herrmann	Germany	0:31	3 (1+0+1+1)	29:31.5	+9.5
3rd place, bronze medalist(s)	1	Marte Olsbu Røiseland	Norway	0:00	3 (1+0+0+2)	29:35.8	+13.8
4	18	Hanna Öberg	Sweden	0:57	2 (0+0+2+0)	29:44.3	+22.3
5	14	Vanessa Hinz	Germany	0:50	1 (0+1+0+0)	29:48.8	+26.8
6	9	Ivona Fialková	Slovakia	0:44	2 (2+0+0+0)	29:57.7	+35.7
7	8	Franziska Preuß	Germany	0:41	2 (0+1+0+1)	30:02.6	+40.6
8	17	Lisa Hauser	Austria	0:56	1 (0+0+0+1)	30:13.4	+51.4
9	12	Baiba Bendika	Latvia	0:47	2 (2+0+0+0)	30:25.2	+1:03.2
10	10	Aita Gasparin	Switzerland	0:44	1 (0+1+0+0)	30:29.4	+1:07.4
11	20	Anaïs Bescond	France	1:00	3 (0+1+1+1)	30:35.4	+1:13.4
12	21	Ekaterina Yurlova-Percht	Russia	1:04	3 (0+1+0+2)	30:37.4	+1:15.4
13	4	Olena Pidhrushna	Ukraine	0:26	4 (2+0+1+1)	30:50.5	+1:28.5
14	57	Ingrid Landmark Tandrevold	Norway	2:01	1 (0+0+0+1)	30:52.1	+1:30.1
15	23	Karolin Horchler	Germany	1:11	0 (0+0+0+0)	30:52.3	+1:30.3
16	50	Elisa Gasparin	Switzerland	1:51	0 (0+0+0+0)	30:54.0	+1:32.0
17	16	Paulína Fialková	Slovakia	0:55	4 (1+0+2+1)	30:54.2	+1:32.2
18	27	Milena Todorova	Bulgaria	1:17	1 (0+1+0+0)	30:54.6	+1:32.6
19	22	Yuliia Dzhima	Ukraine	1:05	4 (1+0+0+3)	31:03.9	+1:41.9
20	59	Tiril Eckhoff	Norway	2:08	3 (0+0+3+0)	31:04.6	+1:42.6
21	38	Svetlana Mironova	Russia	1:34	3 (1+1+1+0)	31:04.9	+1:42.9
22	40	Kaisa Mäkäräinen	Finland	1:35	4 (0+2+1+1)	31:07.4	+1:45.4
23	48	Larisa Kuklina	Russia	1:50	2 (0+0+1+1)	31:08.7	+1:46.7
24	53	Irina Starykh	Russia	1:57	2 (0+1+0+1)	31:13.9	+1:51.9
25	37	Markéta Davidová	Czech Republic	1:32	3 (0+0+3+0)	31:15.2	+1:53.2
26	28	Monika Hojnisz	Poland	1:20	3 (0+2+0+1)	31:15.6	+1:53.6
27	6	Lisa Vittozzi	Italy	0:38	3 (1+0+0+2)	31:19.4	+1:57.4
28	19	Katharina Innerhofer	Austria	0:58	6 (1+1+2+2)	31:24.0	+2:02.0
29	33	Mona Brorsson	Sweden	1:23	3 (0+0+1+2)	31:25.3	+2:03.3
30	15	Célia Aymonier	France	0:50	5 (1+1+1+2)	31:33.6	+2:11.6
31	51	Christina Rieder	Austria	1:56	1 (0+0+0+1)	31:37.8	+2:15.8
32	44	Linn Persson	Sweden	1:41	4 (1+1+2+0)	31:51.9	+2:29.9
33	45	Federica Sanfilippo	Italy	1:44	2 (0+1+1+0)	31:53.8	+2:31.8
34	47	Kinga Zbylut	Poland	1:48	2 (0+0+2+0)	31:58.2	+2:36.2
35	41	Julia Simon	France	1:36	5 (0+0+4+1)	32:03.6	+2:41.6
36	2	Susan Dunklee	United States	0:07	6 (0+1+0+5)	32:04.4	+2:42.4
37	32	Justine Braisaz	France	1:22	6 (1+2+1+2)	32:08.3	+2:46.3
38	29	Lea Einfalt	Slovenia	1:21	3 (0+2+1+0)	32:13.4	+2:51.4
39	11	Vita Semerenko	Ukraine	0:46	4 (0+0+2+2)	32:15.4	+2:53.4
40	25	Selina Gasparin	Switzerland	1:13	6 (1+3+0+2)	32:20.9	+2:58.9
41	35	Emma Lunder	Canada	1:29	4 (2+2+0+0)	32:23.5	+3:01.5
42	3	Lucie Charvátová	Czech Republic	0:21	7 (3+0+1+3)	32:29.4	+3:07.4
43	36	Valentyna Semerenko	Ukraine	1:31	4 (0+1+2+1)	32:33.0	+3:11.0
44	24	Eva Puskarčíková	Czech Republic	1:12	4 (2+0+1+1)	32:34.8	+3:12.8
45	42	Yelizaveta Belchenko	Kazakhstan	1:39	2 (0+0+1+1)	32:36.5	+3:14.5
46	26	Clare Egan	United States	1:13	6 (1+1+2+2)	32:39.8	+3:17.8
47	13	Elvira Öberg	Sweden	0:47	6 (2+3+1+0)	32:43.5	+3:21.5
48	30	Regina Oja	Estonia	1:22	3 (1+0+2+0)	32:56.0	+3:34.0
49	52	Iryna Kryuko	Belarus	1:56	4 (2+1+1+0)	32:57.2	+3:35.2
50	39	Meng Fanqi	China	1:35	2 (1+0+1+0)	33:19.4	+3:57.4
51	31	Johanna Talihärm	Estonia	1:22	5 (1+3+1+0)	33:48.3	+4:26.3
52	55	Sari Maeda	Japan	1:59	4 (0+1+2+1)	33:54.8	+4:32.8
53	43	Nadia Moser	Canada	1:39	6 (1+1+2+2)	34:03.5	+4:41.5
54	56	Emily Dickson	Canada	2:01	4 (2+0+0+2)	34:22.2	+5:00.2
55	54	Magdalena Gwizdoń	Poland	1:58	4 (0+1+2+1)	34:22.9	+5:00.9
56	34	Natalija Kočergina	Lithuania	1:27	9 (1+4+2+2)	35:16.4	+5:54.4
	46	Nika Vindišar	Slovenia	1:47	6 (2+2+2+0)	Lapped	
	49	Elena Kruchinkina	Belarus	1:50	(3+3+2+ )	Lapped	
	60	Lotte Lie	Belgium	2:09	3 (0+1+2+0)	Lapped	
	58	Kamila Żuk	Poland	2:07	Did not start		
