= Biathlon World Championships 2020 – Women's mass start =

Women's mass start at the Biathlon World Championships 2020
- Venue: South Tyrol Arena
- Location: Antholz-Anterselva, Italy
- Dates: 23 February
- Competitors: 30 from 16 nations
- Winning time: 39:14.0

Medalists
gold medal	Marte Olsbu Røiseland	Norway
silver medal	Dorothea Wierer	Italy
bronze medal	Hanna Öberg	Sweden

The Women's mass start competition at the Biathlon World Championships 2020 was held on 23 February 2020.

== Results ==
The race was started at 12:30.

Rank	Bib	Name	Nationality	Time	Penalties (P+P+S+S)	Deficit
1st place, gold medalist(s)	1	Marte Olsbu Røiseland	Norway	39:14.0	2 (1+1+0+0)	
2nd place, silver medalist(s)	2	Dorothea Wierer	Italy	39:34.7	3 (1+0+1+1)	+20.7
3rd place, bronze medalist(s)	8	Hanna Öberg	Sweden	39:40.1	3 (1+0+0+2)	+26.1
4	18	Monika Hojnisz-Staręga	Poland	39:43.1	2 (0+0+1+1)	+29.1
5	12	Julia Simon	France	39:59.1	2 (0+0+0+2)	+45.1
6	20	Ekaterina Yurlova-Percht	Russia	40:06.0	2 (0+0+1+1)	+52.0
7	7	Tiril Eckhoff	Norway	40:14.2	4 (0+1+1+2)	+1:00.2
8	14	Franziska Preuß	Germany	40:14.3	3 (0+0+2+1)	+1:00.3
9	26	Lisa Hauser	Austria	40:16.5	2 (0+1+1+0)	+1:02.5
10	16	Anaïs Bescond	France	40:35.3	3 (0+0+1+2)	+1:21.3
11	29	Célia Aymonier	France	40:38.2	4 (0+2+1+1)	+1:24.2
12	4	Denise Herrmann	Germany	40:40.1	7 (1+0+4+2)	+1:26.1
13	25	Karolin Horchler	Germany	40:44.9	3 (0+0+3+0)	+1:30.9
14	15	Kaisa Mäkäräinen	Finland	40:47.7	5 (0+1+1+3)	+1:33.7
15	10	Paulína Fialková	Slovakia	40:49.9	1 (1+0+0+0)	+1:35.9
16	9	Ingrid Landmark Tandrevold	Norway	40:57.3	4 (0+1+1+2)	+1:43.3
17	5	Vanessa Hinz	Germany	41:16.3	3 (1+0+1+1)	+2:02.3
18	19	Baiba Bendika	Latvia	41:24.9	5 (1+2+1+1)	+2:10.9
19	27	Katharina Innerhofer	Austria	41:33.4	6 (0+0+3+3)	+2:19.4
20	17	Markéta Davidová	Czech Republic	41:45.0	5 (0+2+1+2)	+2:31.0
21	21	Aita Gasparin	Switzerland	41:51.8	4 (1+0+1+2)	+2:37.8
22	11	Justine Braisaz	France	41:59.5	6 (2+1+1+2)	+2:45.5
23	30	Eva Puskarčíková	Czech Republic	42:12.5	2 (0+1+1+0)	+2:58.5
24	22	Olena Pidhrushna	Ukraine	42:41.5	2 (0+0+1+1)	+3:27.5
25	23	Ivona Fialková	Slovakia	42:54.0	6 (1+1+0+4)	+3:40.0
26	28	Elvira Öberg	Sweden	43:04.5	5 (1+1+2+1)	+3:50.5
27	3	Susan Dunklee	United States	43:16.5	5 (0+1+2+2)	+4:02.5
28	24	Milena Todorova	Bulgaria	43:34.2	7 (2+2+2+1)	+4:20.2
29	6	Lucie Charvátová	Czech Republic	44:07.6	8 (2+2+3+1)	+4:53.6
30	13	Lisa Vittozzi	Italy	44:12.1	9 (2+5+1+1)	+4:58.1
