= Biathlon World Championships 2020 – Women's individual =

Women's individual at the Biathlon World Championships 2020
- Venue: South Tyrol Arena
- Location: Antholz-Anterselva, Italy
- Dates: 18 February
- Competitors: 100 from 33 nations
- Winning time: 43:07.7

Medalists
gold medal	Dorothea Wierer	Italy
silver medal	Vanessa Hinz	Germany
bronze medal	Marte Olsbu Røiseland	Norway

The Women's individual competition at the Biathlon World Championships 2020 was held on 18 February 2020.

== Results ==
The race was started at 14:15.

Rank	Bib	Name	Nationality	Time	Penalties (P+S+P+S)	Deficit
1st place, gold medalist(s)	57	Dorothea Wierer	Italy	43:07.7	2 (1+1+0+0)	
2nd place, silver medalist(s)	35	Vanessa Hinz	Germany	43:09.9	1 (0+0+0+1)	+2.2
3rd place, bronze medalist(s)	18	Marte Olsbu Røiseland	Norway	43:23.5	2 (0+1+0+1)	+15.8
4	3	Hanna Öberg	Sweden	43:46.4	2 (1+0+0+1)	+38.7
5	27	Franziska Preuß	Germany	44:11.1	2 (2+0+0+0)	+1:03.4
6	8	Monika Hojnisz	Poland	44:17.8	2 (0+0+0+2)	+1:10.1
7	86	Christina Rieder	Austria	44:28.3	1 (0+0+0+1)	+1:20.6
8	49	Markéta Davidová	Czech Republic	44:38.4	3 (1+1+1+0)	+1:30.7
9	42	Galina Vishnevskaya	Kazakhstan	44:39.1	0 (0+0+0+0)	+1:31.4
10	19	Eva Puskarčíková	Czech Republic	44:40.3	1 (0+0+1+0)	+1:32.6
11	93	Anastasiya Merkushyna	Ukraine	44:42.8	2 (0+1+0+1)	+1:35.1
12	39	Denise Herrmann	Germany	44:48.6	4 (1+1+0+2)	+1:40.9
13	36	Ekaterina Yurlova-Percht	Russia	45:14.8	3 (0+2+0+1)	+2:07.1
14	59	Elvira Öberg	Sweden	45:22.9	2 (1+0+1+0)	+2:15.2
15	9	Tiril Eckhoff	Norway	45:28.4	4 (1+1+2+0)	+2:20.7
16	94	Ingrid Landmark Tandrevold	Norway	45:31.8	3 (0+1+0+2)	+2:24.1
17	15	Milena Todorova	Bulgaria	45:42.0	2 (0+2+0+0)	+2:34.3
18	43	Mona Brorsson	Sweden	45:45.7	2 (1+0+0+1)	+2:38.0
19	54	Justine Braisaz	France	46:11.9	4 (3+0+0+1)	+3:04.2
20	1	Katharina Innerhofer	Austria	46:17.0	4 (2+1+0+1)	+3:09.3
21	12	Kaisa Mäkäräinen	Finland	46:17.3	5 (1+2+1+1)	+3:09.6
22	16	Svetlana Mironova	Russia	46:19.8	4 (0+2+0+2)	+3:12.1
23	70	Larisa Kuklina	Russia	46:20.8	4 (1+1+2+0)	+3:13.1
24	51	Paulína Fialková	Slovakia	46:23.5	4 (0+1+2+1)	+3:15.8
25	5	Baiba Bendika	Latvia	46:25.4	4 (1+2+1+0)	+3:17.7
26	63	Karolin Horchler	Germany	46:29.9	3 (0+2+0+1)	+3:22.2
27	37	Aita Gasparin	Switzerland	46:40.5	3 (1+1+0+1)	+3:32.8
28	69	Célia Aymonier	France	46:43.7	4 (1+1+0+2)	+3:36.0
29	38	Vita Semerenko	Ukraine	46:50.2	3 (2+0+1+0)	+3:42.5
30	20	Iryna Kryuko	Belarus	47:01.6	4 (2+0+0+2)	+3:53.9
31	47	Julia Simon	France	47:04.0	5 (2+1+1+1)	+3:56.3
32	100	Irina Starykh	Russia	47:09.5	5 (0+1+1+3)	+4:01.8
33	52	Nadia Moser	Canada	47:09.6	3 (0+0+2+1)	+4:01.9
34	23	Fuyuko Tachizaki	Japan	47:14.7	3 (2+0+1+0)	+4:07.0
35	14	Emma Lunder	Canada	47:22.8	4 (0+1+1+2)	+4:15.1
36	32	Daniela Kadeva	Bulgaria	47:24.4	2 (2+0+0+0)	+4:16.7
37	76	Yuliia Dzhima	Ukraine	47:30.9	5 (0+1+2+2)	+4:23.2
38	7	Tang Jialin	China	47:37.0	2 (0+2+0+0)	+4:29.3
39	40	Suvi Minkkinen	Finland	47:37.1	2 (1+0+0+1)	+4:29.4
40	11	Ivona Fialková	Slovakia	47:38.4	5 (1+1+0+3)	+4:30.7
41	30	Federica Sanfilippo	Italy	47:48.8	4 (2+2+0+0)	+4:41.1
42	6	Valentyna Semerenko	Ukraine	47:49.7	4 (1+1+0+2)	+4:42.0
43	87	Johanna Skottheim	Sweden	47:52.2	5 (1+2+0+2)	+4:44.5
44	85	Chu Yuanmeng	China	47:54.4	4 (2+0+2+0)	+4:46.7
45	31	Lotte Lie	Belgium	48:01.2	2 (1+1+0+0)	+4:53.5
46	79	Lucie Charvátová	Czech Republic	48:14.0	6 (3+1+0+2)	+5:06.3
47	17	Linn Persson	Sweden	48:16.8	5 (2+1+2+0)	+5:09.1
48	81	Yelizaveta Belchenko	Kazakhstan	48:19.8	4 (1+1+0+2)	+5:12.1
49	75	Michela Carrara	Italy	48:28.5	5 (2+2+1+0)	+5:20.8
50	74	Hanna Sola	Belarus	48:39.4	5 (2+2+1+0)	+5:31.7
51	24	Lisa Hauser	Austria	48:39.9	5 (2+1+2+0)	+5:32.2
52	22	Anaïs Bescond	France	48:40.2	6 (2+2+1+1)	+5:32.5
53	55	Johanna Talihärm	Estonia	48:49.5	4 (0+1+2+1)	+5:41.8
54	82	Julia Schwaiger	Austria	48:51.5	5 (1+2+1+1)	+5:43.8
55	26	Susan Dunklee	United States	48:56.8	5 (2+0+1+2)	+5:49.1
56	58	Sari Maeda	Japan	49:10.2	5 (1+1+1+2)	+6:02.5
57	10	Selina Gasparin	Switzerland	49:17.6	7 (1+3+2+1)	+6:09.9
58	2	Clare Egan	United States	49:18.9	6 (0+3+2+1)	+6:11.2
59	13	Lena Häcki	Switzerland	49:29.0	7 (2+3+1+1)	+6:21.3
60	88	Synnøve Solemdal	Norway	49:32.9	4 (0+3+0+1)	+6:25.2
61	44	Natalija Kočergina	Lithuania	49:34.3	6 (2+1+2+1)	+6:26.6
62	97	Tereza Vinklárková	Czech Republic	49:35.0	4 (1+1+2+0)	+6:27.3
63	72	Veronika Machyniaková	Slovakia	49:37.3	3 (0+2+0+1)	+6:29.6
64	73	Amanda Lightfoot	Great Britain	49:46.1	4 (1+2+1+0)	+6:38.4
65	61	Daŵnka Koeva	Bulgaria	49:47.4	4 (1+2+0+1)	+6:39.7
66	90	Nina Zadravec	Slovenia	50:08.9	5 (0+2+2+1)	+7:01.2
67	21	Mari Eder	Finland	50:14.9	8 (4+2+1+1)	+7:07.2
68	4	Regina Oja	Estonia	50:25.5	6 (1+0+3+2)	+7:17.8
69	91	Emily Dreissigacker	United States	50:32.0	3 (2+1+0+0)	+7:24.3
70	95	Sarah Beaudry	Canada	50:33.0	4 (1+0+3+0)	+7:25.3
71	28	Lisa Vittozzi	Italy	50:40.2	8 (1+3+3+1)	+7:32.5
72	41	Zhang Yan	China	50:41.5	4 (3+0+1+0)	+7:33.8
73	66	Kinga Zbylut	Poland	50:54.6	7 (1+2+2+2)	+7:46.9
74	78	Elisa Gasparin	Switzerland	50:57.0	7 (1+3+2+1)	+7:49.3
75	48	Anna Frolina	South Korea	50:58.0	7 (0+1+4+2)	+7:50.3
76	29	Jūlija Matvijenko	Latvia	51:09.5	1 (1+0+0+0)	+8:01.8
77	53	Elena Kruchinkina	Belarus	51:17.1	8 (1+3+3+1)	+8:09.4
78	80	Tuuli Tomingas	Estonia	51:23.5	6 (1+3+1+1)	+8:15.8
79	62	Joanne Reid	United States	51:26.7	6 (1+1+2+2)	+8:19.0
80	34	Alla Ghilenko	Moldova	51:49.7	5 (1+1+3+0)	+8:42.0
81	46	Lea Einfalt	Slovenia	51:52.8	8 (3+1+3+1)	+8:45.1
82	25	Enikö Marton	Romania	51:54.2	4 (2+0+1+1)	+8:46.5
83	68	Sára Pónya	Hungary	52:06.0	2 (1+1+0+0)	+8:58.3
84	56	Kamila Żuk	Poland	52:12.6	10 (1+3+4+2)	+9:04.9
85	99	Anastassiya Kondratyeva	Kazakhstan	52:18.8	7 (2+1+4+0)	+9:11.1
86	33	Terézia Poliaková	Slovakia	52:29.2	5 (4+0+1+0)	+9:21.5
87	65	Megan Bankes	Canada	52:34.7	7 (1+2+2+2)	+9:27.0
88	89	Irina Kruchinkina	Belarus	53:20.6	8 (3+2+1+2)	+10:12.9
89	45	Nika Blaženić	Croatia	53:26.9	6 (1+1+1+3)	+10:19.2
90	92	Yurie Tanaka	Japan	53:27.9	7 (1+1+3+2)	+10:20.2
91	84	Polona Klemenčič	Slovenia	54:42.0	9 (2+2+3+2)	+11:34.3
92	96	Joanna Jakieła	Poland	54:49.0	11 (3+2+4+2)	+11:41.3
93	71	Ieva Pūce	Latvia	55:31.7	6 (0+3+1+2)	+12:24.0
94	50	Jillian Colebourn	Australia	55:35.2	8 (1+2+3+2)	+12:27.5
95	83	Mariya Abe	South Korea	56:20.3	7 (1+2+3+1)	+13:12.6
96	98	Jung Ju-mi	South Korea	57:26.8	7 (2+0+2+3)	+14:19.1
97	60	Anika Kožica	Croatia	1:00:57.1	12 (4+1+4+3)	+17:49.4
98	77	Enkhbayar Ariuntungalag	Mongolia	1:02:42.9	14 (5+3+4+2)	+19:35.2
	64	Ana Larisa Cotrus	Romania	Did not finish		
	67	Gabrielė Leščinskaitė	Lithuania	Did not finish		
