= Biathlon World Championships 2019 – Single mixed relay =

Single mixed relay at the Biathlon World Championships 2019
- Venue: Östersund Ski Stadium
- Location: Östersund, Sweden
- Dates: 14 March
- Competitors: 56 from 28 nations
- Teams: 28
- Winning time: 35:43.2

Medalists
gold medal	Marte Olsbu Røiseland; Johannes Thingnes Bø	Norway
silver medal	Dorothea Wierer; Lukas Hofer	Italy
bronze medal	Hanna Öberg; Sebastian Samuelsson	Sweden

The single mixed relay competition at the Biathlon World Championships 2019 was held on 14 March 2019.

== Results ==
The race was started at 17:10.

Rank	Bib	Team	Time	Penalties (P+S)	Deficit
1st place, gold medalist(s)	2	Norway; Marte Olsbu Røiseland; Johannes Thingnes Bø; Marte Olsbu Røiseland; Johannes Thingnes Bø	35:43.2; 9:02.6; 7:45.6; 8:36.9; 10:18.1	0+2 0+4; 0+1 0+1; 0+0 0+3; 0+1 0+0; 0+0 0+0	
2nd place, silver medalist(s)	4	Italy; Dorothea Wierer; Lukas Hofer; Dorothea Wierer; Lukas Hofer	35:56.6; 8:49.8; 7:51.3; 8:44.4; 10:31.1	0+1 0+4; 0+1 0+0; 0+0 0+2; 0+0 0+1; 0+0 0+1	+13.4
3rd place, bronze medalist(s)	7	Sweden; Hanna Öberg; Sebastian Samuelsson; Hanna Öberg; Sebastian Samuelsson	36:03.2; 8:56.5; 7:55.0; 8:36.1; 10:35.6	0+5 0+3; 0+2 0+0; 0+1 0+2; 0+1 0+0; 0+1 0+1	+20.0
4	6	Germany; Denise Herrmann; Erik Lesser; Denise Herrmann; Erik Lesser	36:13.7; 9:10.6; 7:26.6; 9:02.4; 10:34.1	0+2 0+4; 0+1 0+2; 0+0 0+0; 0+1 0+2; 0+0 0+0	+30.5
5	5	Ukraine; Anastasiya Merkushyna; Dmytro Pidruchnyi; Anastasiya Merkushyna; Dmytro Pidruchnyi	36:24.7; 8:50.6; 7:37.1; 9:24.4; 10:32.6	0+2 0+3; 0+0 0+0; 0+0 0+0; 0+2 0+3; 0+0 0+0	+41.5
6	9	Russia; Evgeniya Pavlova; Matvey Eliseev; Evgeniya Pavlova; Matvey Eliseev	36:35.9; 8:57.4; 7:51.8; 9:09.6; 10:37.1	0+1 0+4; 0+0 0+1; 0+0 0+3; 0+1 0+0; 0+0 0+0	+52.7
7	3	France; Julia Simon; Antonin Guigonnat; Julia Simon; Antonin Guigonnat	36:49.7; 8:50.0; 7:43.3; 9:13.2; 11:03.2	0+6 0+4; 0+1 0+0; 0+1 0+0; 0+3 0+2; 0+1 0+2	+1:06.5
8	1	Austria; Lisa Hauser; Simon Eder; Lisa Hauser; Simon Eder	36:51.4; 8:52.0; 7:44.8; 9:06.5; 11:08.1	0+1 0+4; 0+0 0+0; 0+1 0+0; 0+0 0+2; 0+0 0+2	+1:08.2
9	13	Czech Republic; Eva Puskarčíková; Ondřej Moravec; Eva Puskarčíková; Ondřej Moravec	37:17.3; 9:15.2; 7:49.5; 9:34.4; 10:38.2	0+0 0+4; 0+0 0+1; 0+0 0+0; 0+0 0+3; 0+0 0+0	+1:34.1
10	22	Latvia; Baiba Bendika; Andrejs Rastorgujevs; Baiba Bendika; Andrejs Rastorgujevs	37:17.5; 9:43.2; 7:46.4; 9:10.8; 10:37.1	0+3 0+3; 0+2 0+2; 0+1 0+1; 0+0 0+3; 0+0 0+0	+1:34.3
11	12	Estonia; Tuuli Tomingas; Rene Zahkna; Tuuli Tomingas; Rene Zahkna	37:22.0; 9:08.7; 7:56.4; 9:22.6; 10:54.3	0+4 0+3; 0+0 0+1; 0+1 0+1; 0+2 0+0; 0+1 0+1	+1:38.8
12	23	Finland; Kaisa Mäkäräinen; Tero Seppälä; Kaisa Mäkäräinen; Tero Seppälä	37:22.2; 9:40.6; 8:02.3; 8:55.3; 10:44.0	0+1 1+5; 0+0 1+3; 0+1 0+1; 0+0 0+1; 0+0 0+0	+1:39.0
13	18	United States; Susan Dunklee; Sean Doherty; Susan Dunklee; Sean Doherty	37:31.1; 9:02.0; 8:37.1; 9:02.2; 10:49.8	1+3 0+4; 0+0 0+0; 1+3 0+2; 0+0 0+2; 0+0 0+0	+1:47.9
14	16	Switzerland; Aita Gasparin; Serafin Wiestner; Aita Gasparin; Serafin Wiestner	38:00.9; 9:23.7; 8:13.8; 9:33.9; 10:49.5	1+4 0+2; 0+0 0+0; 1+3 0+0; 0+0 0+2; 0+1 0+0	+2:17.7
15	8	Canada; Emma Lunder; Scott Gow; Emma Lunder; Scott Gow	38:08.0; 9:24.9; 7:54.8; 9:11.1; 11:37.2	0+5 0+5; 0+2 0+0; 0+0 0+1; 0+0 0+1; 0+3 0+3	+2:24.8
16	15	Belarus; Hanna Sola; Vladimir Chepelin; Hanna Sola; Vladimir Chepelin	38:36.0; 9:34.8; 7:52.9; 9:37.0; 11:31.3	0+6 0+3; 0+3 0+0; 0+0 0+0; 0+3 0+1; 0+0 0+2	+2:52.8
17	10	Japan; Fuyuko Tachizaki; Mikito Tachizaki; Fuyuko Tachizaki; Mikito Tachizaki	38:50.2; 9:24.3; 8:54.0; 9:06.7; 11:25.2	0+3 2+3; 0+2 0+0; 0+1 2+3; 0+0 0+0; 0+0 0+0	+3:07.0
18	19	Kazakhstan; Galina Vishnevskaya; Roman Yeremin; Galina Vishnevskaya; Roman Yeremin	38:55.5; 9:26.1; 8:16.7; 9:40.8; 11:31.9	0+9 0+4; 0+1 0+0; 0+2 0+2; 0+3 0+1; 0+3 0+1	+3:12.3
19	17	Bulgaria; Daniela Kadeva; Anton Sinapov; Daniela Kadeva; Anton Sinapov	39:10.2; 9:30.6; 8:01.1; 9:50.5; 11:48.0	0+1 2+8; 0+0 0+1; 0+0 0+1; 0+0 1+3; 0+1 1+3	+3:27.0
20	26	South Korea; Anna Frolina; Timofey Lapshin; Anna Frolina; Timofey Lapshin	39:10.9; 10:14.3; 7:55.6; 9:22.9; 11:38.1	1+7 1+5; 1+3 0+1; 0+1 0+1; 0+1 0+0; 0+2 1+3	+3:27.7
21	24	Moldova; Alla Ghilenko; Mihail Usov; Alla Ghilenko; Mihail Usov	39:45.9; 9:50.5; 8:02.5; 9:56.1; 11:56.8	0+3 1+8; 0+1 0+2; 0+0 0+2; 0+1 0+1; 0+1 1+3	+4:02.7
22	21	China; Tang Jialin; Wang Wenqiang; Tang Jialin; Wang Wenqiang	40:40.4; 9:21.3; 8:15.9; 10:34.8; 12:28.4	0+4 1+6; 0+1 0+0; 0+1 0+2; 0+2 1+3; 0+0 0+1	+4:57.2
23	11	Poland; Kinga Zbylut; Andrzej Nędza-Kubiniec; Kinga Zbylut; Andrzej Nędza-Kubiniec	41:09.4; 11:34.2; 8:16.6; 9:29.4; 11:49.2	0+5 2+7; 0+0 2+3; 0+2 0+2; 0+1 0+1; 0+2 0+1	+5:26.2
24	27	Slovakia; Terézia Poliaková; Tomáš Hasilla; Terézia Poliaková; Tomáš Hasilla	LAP; 10:06.1; 18:31.6	0+4 1+9; 0+1 0+3; 0+1 0+3; 0+2 1+3	
25	20	Lithuania; Natalija Kočergina; Karol Dombrovski; Natalija Kočergina; Karol Dombrovski	LAP; 10:09.5; 8:26.2	0+6 1+7; 0+1 1+3; 0+2 0+3; 0+3 0+1	
26	14	Slovenia; Polona Klemenčič; Mitja Drinovec; Polona Klemenčič; Mitja Drinovec	LAP; 10:54.5; 8:03.5	3+8 1+5; 3+3 0+2; 0+3 0+0; 0+2 1+3	
27	25	Romania; Enikő Márton; Raul Antonio Flore; Enikő Márton; Raul Antonio Flore	LAP; 10:48.5; 8:28.0	0+0 2+6; 0+0 2+3; 0+0 0+3; 0+0	
28	28	Belgium; Rieke De Maeyer; Tom Lahaye-Goffart; Rieke De Maeyer; Tom Lahaye-Goffart	LAP; 10:58.0; 8:47.9	0+1 1+5; 0+0 0+2; 0+0 1+3; 0+1	
	29	Greece; Maria Tsakiri; Apostolos Angelis; Maria Tsakiri; Apostolos Angelis	Did not start		
