= Biathlon World Championships 2019 – Women's pursuit =

Women's pursuit at the Biathlon World Championships 2019
- Venue: Östersund Ski Stadium
- Location: Östersund, Sweden
- Dates: 10 March
- Competitors: 55 from 21 nations
- Winning time: 31:45.9

Medalists
gold medal	Denise Herrmann	Germany
silver medal	Tiril Eckhoff	Norway
bronze medal	Laura Dahlmeier	Germany

The women's pursuit competition at the Biathlon World Championships 2019 was held on 10 March 2019.

== Results ==
The race was started at 13:45.

Rank	Bib	Name	Nationality	Start	Penalties (P+P+S+S)	Time	Deficit
1st place, gold medalist(s)	6	Denise Herrmann	Germany	0:24	2 (0+0+2+0)	31:45.9	
2nd place, silver medalist(s)	9	Tiril Eckhoff	Norway	0:33	2 (0+0+2+0)	32:17.3	+31.4
3rd place, bronze medalist(s)	3	Laura Dahlmeier	Germany	0:13	1 (0+0+1+0)	32:17.5	+31.6
4	25	Marte Olsbu Røiseland	Norway	1:11	4 (2+0+1+1)	33:20.9	+1:35.0
5	4	Hanna Öberg	Sweden	0:13	5 (1+1+1+2)	33:20.9	+1:35.0
6	1	Anastasiya Kuzmina	Slovakia	0:00	7 (2+2+2+1)	33:27.2	+1:41.3
7	5	Mona Brorsson	Sweden	0:22	4 (0+0+0+4)	33:33.1	+1:47.2
8	2	Ingrid Landmark Tandrevold	Norway	0:10	4 (0+1+2+1)	33:47.1	+2:01.2
9	24	Evgeniya Pavlova	Russia	1:08	1 (0+0+0+1)	34:00.2	+2:14.3
10	21	Lisa Vittozzi	Italy	1:01	6 (3+3+0+0)	34:18.1	+2:32.2
11	43	Anna Magnusson	Sweden	2:03	1 (0+0+1+0)	34:19.5	+2:33.6
12	11	Clare Egan	United States	0:33	5 (2+0+0+3)	34:30.2	+2:44.3
13	7	Markéta Davidová	Czech Republic	0:27	6 (2+1+1+2)	34:30.9	+2:45.0
14	53	Lena Häcki	Switzerland	2:13	3 (1+0+1+1)	34:36.0	+2:50.1
15	28	Anastasiya Merkushyna	Ukraine	1:17	4 (0+2+2+0)	34:37.6	+2:51.7
16	38	Veronika Vítková	Czech Republic	1:42	2 (0+1+0+1)	34:47.4	+3:01.5
17	12	Kaisa Mäkäräinen	Finland	0:34	7 (2+2+1+2)	34:48.9	+3:03.0
18	23	Célia Aymonier	France	1:05	6 (3+2+1+0)	34:51.4	+3:05.5
19	8	Ekaterina Yurlova-Percht	Russia	0:31	7 (1+1+2+3)	34:53.7	+3:07.8
20	10	Dorothea Wierer	Italy	0:33	8 (1+4+0+3)	34:55.2	+3:09.3
21	42	Linn Persson	Sweden	2:00	3 (0+2+0+1)	35:04.2	+3:18.3
22	40	Franziska Hildebrand	Germany	1:55	2 (1+1+0+0)	35:06.6	+3:20.7
23	17	Baiba Bendika	Latvia	0:56	5 (1+1+2+1)	35:08.3	+3:22.4
24	57	Susan Dunklee	United States	2:31	3 (2+0+0+1)	35:13.5	+3:27.6
25	31	Svetlana Mironova	Russia	1:26	6 (1+0+2+3)	35:13.8	+3:27.9
26	39	Fuyuko Tachizaki	Japan	1:55	3 (1+2+0+0)	35:22.3	+3:36.4
27	16	Franziska Preuß	Germany	0:52	7 (2+4+1+0)	35:33.6	+3:47.7
28	50	Tuuli Tomingas	Estonia	2:11	2 (1+0+0+1)	35:38.8	+3:52.9
29	19	Elisa Gasparin	Switzerland	0:58	5 (1+0+1+3)	35:39.1	+3:53.2
30	14	Sari Maeda	Japan	0:49	5 (2+1+2+0)	35:43.3	+3:57.4
31	37	Zhang Yan	China	1:39	1 (0+0+0+1)	36:02.3	+4:16.4
32	15	Joanne Reid	United States	0:50	6 (3+2+1+0)	36:10.1	+4:24.2
33	26	Iryna Kryuko	Belarus	1:12	6 (1+0+1+4)	36:10.7	+4:24.8
34	20	Johanna Talihärm	Estonia	1:00	6 (2+1+1+2)	36:21.4	+4:35.5
35	13	Dzinara Alimbekava	Belarus	0:45	7 (2+3+1+1)	36:22.5	+4:36.6
36	46	Kamila Żuk	Poland	2:09	5 (2+1+2+0)	36:27.5	+4:41.6
37	33	Ivona Fialková	Slovakia	1:36	7 (1+2+0+4)	36:38.5	+4:52.6
38	29	Valentyna Semerenko	Ukraine	1:20	6 (3+1+1+1)	36:42.7	+4:56.8
39	35	Federica Sanfilippo	Italy	1:37	5 (1+1+2+1)	36:50.6	+5:04.7
40	49	Katharina Innerhofer	Austria	2:11	6 (1+0+2+3)	36:58.0	+5:12.1
41	59	Eva Puskarčíková	Czech Republic	2:32	4 (2+0+0+2)	37:02.3	+5:16.4
42	47	Sarah Beaudry	Canada	2:10	4 (2+1+1+0)	37:09.4	+5:23.5
43	30	Selina Gasparin	Switzerland	1:23	8 (0+0+4+4)	37:14.0	+5:28.1
44	36	Elena Kruchinkina	Belarus	1:39	8 (2+2+2+2)	37:17.2	+5:31.3
45	44	Irina Starykh	Russia	2:07	4 (1+1+0+2)	37:21.5	+5:35.6
46	56	Magdalena Gwizdoń	Poland	2:23	5 (0+2+1+2)	37:22.6	+5:36.7
47	55	Julia Schwaiger	Austria	2:23	4 (0+1+3+0)	37:27.3	+5:41.4
48	52	Nicole Gontier	Italy	2:12	8 (1+2+3+2)	37:35.6	+5:49.7
49	45	Venla Lehtonen	Finland	2:07	4 (0+2+2+0)	37:46.2	+6:00.3
50	22	Irina Kruchinkina	Belarus	1:03	11 (3+3+2+3)	38:26.2	+6:40.3
51	27	Natalija Kočergina	Lithuania	1:17	8 (1+2+2+3)	38:55.1	+7:09.2
52	41	Tang Jialin	China	1:57	9 (1+4+2+2)	39:30.7	+7:44.8
	18	Rosanna Crawford	Canada	0:56	(3+4+3+ )	Lapped	
	51	Emma Lunder	Canada	2:11	(2+5+0+ )	Lapped	
	58	Megan Bankes	Canada	2:32	(1+4+4+ )	Lapped	
	32	Anaïs Chevalier	France	1:32	Did not start		
	34	Monika Hojnisz	Poland	1:37	Did not start		
	48	Paulína Fialková	Slovakia	2:10	Did not start		
	54	Yuliia Dzhima	Ukraine	2:21	Did not start		
	60	Justine Braisaz	France	2:35	Did not start		
