= Biathlon World Championships 2020 – Women's relay =

Women's relay at the Biathlon World Championships 2020
- Venue: South Tyrol Arena
- Location: Antholz-Anterselva, Italy
- Dates: 22 February
- Competitors: 96 from 24 nations
- Teams: 24
- Winning time: 1:07:05.7

Medalists
gold medal	Synnøve Solemdal; Ingrid Landmark Tandrevold; Tiril Eckhoff; Marte Olsbu Røiseland	Norway
silver medal	Karolin Horchler; Vanessa Hinz; Franziska Preuß; Denise Herrmann	Germany
bronze medal	Anastasiya Merkushyna; Yuliia Dzhima; Vita Semerenko; Olena Pidhrushna	Ukraine

The Women's relay competition at the Biathlon World Championships 2020 was held on 22 February 2020.

== Results ==
The race was started at 11:45.

Rank	Bib	Team	Time	Penalties (P+S)	Deficit
1st place, gold medalist(s)	1	Norway; Synnøve Solemdal; Ingrid Landmark Tandrevold; Tiril Eckhoff; Marte Olsbu Røiseland	1:07:05.7; 17:04.5; 16:31.6; 17:05.5; 16:24.1	0+4 1+5; 0+1 0+0; 0+0 0+2; 0+3 1+3; 0+0 0+0	
2nd place, silver medalist(s)	6	Germany; Karolin Horchler; Vanessa Hinz; Franziska Preuß; Denise Herrmann	1:07:16.4; 17:33.6; 16:28.9; 16:40.1; 16:33.8	0+4 0+5; 0+1 0+3; 0+0 0+0; 0+1 0+0; 0+2 0+2	+10.7
3rd place, bronze medalist(s)	7	Ukraine; Anastasiya Merkushyna; Yuliia Dzhima; Vita Semerenko; Olena Pidhrushna	1:07:24.1; 17:00.6; 16:38.5; 17:14.6; 16:30.4	0+4 0+4; 0+1 0+1; 0+2 0+0; 0+1 0+2; 0+0 0+1	+18.4
4	8	Czech Republic; Jessica Jislová; Markéta Davidová; Lucie Charvátová; Eva Kristejn Puskarčíková	1:07:36.8; 17:05.2; 16:28.0; 17:08.1; 16:55.5	0+4 0+6; 0+0 0+2; 0+0 0+1; 0+3 0+3; 0+1 0+0	+31.1
5	4	Sweden; Elvira Öberg; Mona Brorsson; Linn Persson; Hanna Öberg	1:07:50.6; 17:05.9; 17:12.3; 16:29.6; 17:02.8	0+5 1+6; 0+2 0+0; 0+2 0+2; 0+0 0+1; 0+1 1+3	+44.9
6	2	Switzerland; Elisa Gasparin; Selina Gasparin; Aita Gasparin; Lena Häcki	1:07:52.8; 16:58.8; 17:03.5; 16:59.1; 16:51.4	0+7 0+4; 0+1 0+0; 0+3 0+2; 0+1 0+0; 0+2 0+2	+47.1
7	13	Poland; Kinga Zbylut; Monika Hojnisz-Staręga; Kamila Żuk; Magdalena Gwizdoń	1:07:56.0; 16:51.5; 16:30.9; 16:37.2; 17:56.4	0+2 0+4; 0+0 0+0; 0+0 0+1; 0+0 0+1; 0+2 0+2	+50.3
8	5	Russia; Ekaterina Yurlova-Percht; Irina Starykh; Svetlana Mironova; Larisa Kuklina	1:08:08.3; 16:47.9; 16:45.0; 17:20.0; 17:15.4	0+2 1+9; 0+0 0+1; 0+0 0+3; 0+0 1+3; 0+2 0+2	+1:02.6
9	15	Canada; Emily Dickson; Emma Lunder; Megan Bankes; Nadia Moser	1:09:19.4; 17:21.2; 16:36.4; 17:35.4; 17:46.4	0+4 1+8; 0+1 0+2; 0+2 0+0; 0+0 1+3; 0+1 0+3	+2:13.7
10	10	Italy; Lisa Vittozzi; Dorothea Wierer; Federica Sanfilippo; Michela Carrara	1:09:35.1; 16:23.6; 16:00.9; 18:22.9; 18:47.7	1+7 2+5; 0+1 0+0; 0+1 0+0; 0+2 2+3; 1+3 0+2	+2:29.4
11	17	Finland; Suvi Minkkinen; Mari Eder; Kaisa Mäkäräinen; Erika Jänkä	1:09:45.9; 17:59.4; 16:37.1; 16:42.4; 18:27.0	0+5 0+6; 0+1 0+2; 0+0 0+1; 0+3 0+0; 0+1 0+3	+2:40.2
12	9	Austria; Julia Schwaiger; Lisa Hauser; Christina Rieder; Katharina Innerhofer	1:09:50.1; 17:16.4; 17:14.2; 16:50.3; 18:29.2	0+5 3+8; 0+0 0+2; 0+2 0+3; 0+0 0+0; 0+3 3+3	+2:44.4
13	12	Belarus; Iryna Kryuko; Hanna Sola; Dzinara Alimbekava; Elena Kruchinkina	1:10:16.4; 17:57.1; 17:17.3; 17:27.6; 17:34.4	1+5 0+8; 1+3 0+1; 0+0 0+3; 0+0 0+2; 0+2 0+2	+3:10.7
14	3	France; Julia Simon; Anaïs Bescond; Célia Aymonier; Justine Braisaz	1:10:49.9; 16:58.2; 16:48.3; 19:56.3; 17:07.1	2+8 2+11; 0+3 0+3; 0+1 0+2; 2+3 2+3; 0+1 0+3	+3:44.2
15	11	United States; Susan Dunklee; Clare Egan; Joanne Reid; Emily Dreissigacker	1:11:01.4; 16:50.7; 17:23.1; 17:53.7; 18:53.9	0+4 0+4; 0+1 0+0; 0+0 0+0; 0+0 0+3; 0+3 0+1	+3:55.7
16	14	China; Chu Yuanmeng; Tang Jialin; Qu Ying; Meng Fanqi	1:11:29.4; 17:23.9; 17:01.6; 19:05.4; 17:58.5	0+1 1+8; 0+0 0+2; 0+0 0+1; 0+1 1+3; 0+0 0+2	+4:23.7
17	23	Slovakia; Ivona Fialková; Terézia Poliaková; Paulína Fialková; Veronika Machyniaková	1:11:59.8; 17:02.2; 18:13.2; 16:47.3; 19:57.1	0+5 0+7; 0+1 0+1; 0+0 0+2; 0+1 0+1; 0+3 0+3	+4:54.1
18	18	Kazakhstan; Galina Vishnevskaya; Yelizaveta Belchenko; Anastasiya Kondratyeva; Alina Kolomiyets	1:12:13.7; 17:58.8; 17:42.3; 18:03.1; 18:29.5	0+8 0+4; 0+3 0+1; 0+2 0+1; 0+1 0+1; 0+2 0+1	+5:08.0
19	19	Slovenia; Nika Vindišar; Lea Einfalt; Nina Zadravec; Polona Klemenčič	LAP; 17:09.8; 17:29.7; 19:49.4	0+8 4+8; 0+1 0+0; 0+1 0+2; 0+3 3+3; 0+3 1+3	
20	20	Bulgaria; Maria Zdravkova; Dafinka Koeva; Milena Todorova; Daniela Kadeva	LAP; 18:31.1; 18:35.6	0+2 0+7; 0+1 0+3; 0+1 0+3; 0+0 0+1	
21	22	Japan; Fuyuko Tachizaki; Sari Maeda; Yurie Tanaka; Asuka Hachisuka	LAP; 17:23.5; 18:09.8	0+4 1+7; 0+0 0+2; 0+1 0+2; 0+3 1+3	
22	21	South Korea; Anna Frolina; Ko Eun-jung; Mariya Abe; Jung Ju-mi	LAP; 17:31.5	0+6 1+4; 0+3 0+1; 0+3 1+3	
23	24	Latvia; Jūlija Matvijenko; Sanita Buliņa; Baiba Bendika; Ieva Pūce	LAP; 19:04.0	0+4 0+1; 0+3 0+1; 0+1 0+0	
	16	Estonia; Regina Oja; Johanna Talihärm; Tuuli Tomingas; Grete Gaim	Disqualified		
