= Biathlon World Championships 2021 – Women's pursuit =

Women's pursuit at the Biathlon World Championships 2021
- Location: Pokljuka, Slovenia
- Date: 14 February
- Competitors: 60 from 24 nations
- Winning time: 30:38.1

Medalists
gold medal	Tiril Eckhoff	Norway
silver medal	Lisa Theresa Hauser	Austria
bronze medal	Anaïs Chevalier-Bouchet	France

The Women's pursuit competition at the Biathlon World Championships 2021 was held on 14 February 2021.

== Results ==
The race was started at 15:30.

Rank	Bib	Name	Nationality	Start	Penalties (P+P+S+S)	Time	Deficit
1st place, gold medalist(s)	1	Tiril Eckhoff	Norway	0:00	2 (1+0+1+0)	30:38.1	
2nd place, silver medalist(s)	9	Lisa Theresa Hauser	Austria	0:51	1 (1+0+0+0)	30:55.4	+17.3
3rd place, bronze medalist(s)	2	Anaïs Chevalier-Bouchet	France	0:12	2 (0+1+0+1)	31:11.1	+33.0
4	20	Dorothea Wierer	Italy	1:22	0 (0+0+0+0)	31:23.3	+45.2
5	8	Franziska Preuß	Germany	0:50	2 (0+0+2+0)	31:27.4	+49.3
6	12	Vanessa Hinz	Germany	1:09	0 (0+0+0+0)	31:43.2	+1:05.1
7	11	Olena Pidhrushna	Ukraine	1:05	0 (0+0+0+0)	31:52.0	+1:13.9
8	4	Denise Herrmann	Germany	0:22	3 (1+0+0+2)	31:54.4	+1:16.3
9	6	Marte Olsbu Røiseland	Norway	0:44	3 (0+0+1+2)	32:04.6	+1:26.5
10	21	Ingrid Landmark Tandrevold	Norway	1:23	2 (0+0+0+2)	32:12.2	+1:34.1
11	38	Dunja Zdouc	Austria	1:59	0 (0+0+0+0)	32:12.8	+1:34.7
12	7	Lena Häcki	Switzerland	0:50	3 (2+0+0+1)	32:30.3	+1:52.2
13	10	Hanna Öberg	Sweden	0:59	3 (0+1+2+0)	32:36.0	+1:57.9
14	22	Elvira Öberg	Sweden	1:26	3 (0+1+1+1)	32:40.9	+2:02.8
15	15	Selina Gasparin	Switzerland	1:13	3 (0+1+1+1)	32:52.6	+2:14.5
16	30	Monika Hojnisz-Staręga	Poland	1:50	1 (0+0+1+0)	32:55.2	+2:17.1
17	17	Ida Lien	Norway	1:17	3 (1+0+0+2)	33:00.8	+2:22.7
18	26	Baiba Bendika	Latvia	1:38	2 (1+0+0+1)	33:12.1	+2:34.0
19	16	Linn Persson	Sweden	1:14	4 (0+0+2+2)	33:16.4	+2:38.3
20	42	Emma Lunder	Canada	2:11	1 (0+1+0+0)	33:17.9	+2:39.8
21	40	Dzinara Alimbekava	Belarus	2:07	2 (0+1+0+1)	33:21.2	+2:43.1
22	28	Julia Simon	France	1:48	5 (2+1+1+1)	33:22.7	+2:44.6
23	19	Irina Kazakevich	RBU	1:20	3 (0+0+1+2)	33:23.8	+2:45.7
24	14	Darya Blashko	Ukraine	1:12	3 (2+1+0+0)	33:37.3	+2:59.2
25	37	Yuliia Dzhima	Ukraine	1:58	3 (0+1+2+0)	33:37.5	+2:59.4
26	3	Hanna Sola	Belarus	0:14	8 (2+2+2+2)	33:38.0	+2:59.9
27	18	Susan Dunklee	United States	1:18	2 (0+0+0+2)	33:39.5	+3:01.4
28	27	Elisa Gasparin	Switzerland	1:46	2 (0+0+1+1)	33:42.8	+3:04.7
29	36	Uliana Kaisheva	RBU	1:56	3 (1+1+1+0)	33:46.1	+3:08.0
30	25	Justine Braisaz-Bouchet	France	1:33	5 (2+2+1+0)	33:51.6	+3:13.5
31	56	Mari Eder	Finland	2:33	1 (1+0+0+0)	33:52.5	+3:14.4
32	44	Markéta Davidová	Czech Republic	2:15	4 (0+2+2+0)	33:56.9	+3:18.8
33	32	Johanna Talihärm	Estonia	1:52	4 (1+2+0+1)	34:06.9	+3:28.8
34	31	Janina Hettich	Germany	1:52	3 (0+1+1+1)	34:08.1	+3:30.0
35	33	Aita Gasparin	Switzerland	1:53	3 (0+2+0+1)	34:12.3	+3:34.2
36	34	Anaïs Bescond	France	1:54	3 (0+1+1+1)	34:13.6	+3:35.5
37	39	Katharina Innerhofer	Austria	2:06	5 (0+0+3+2)	34:14.0	+3:35.9
38	23	Michela Carrara	Italy	1:29	5 (1+1+2+1)	34:14.5	+3:36.4
39	46	Yelizaveta Belchenko	Kazakhstan	2:19	1 (0+0+1+0)	34:15.9	+3:37.8
40	51	Evgeniya Pavlova	RBU	2:27	3 (3+0+0+0)	34:18.7	+3:40.6
41	13	Paulina Fialkova	Slovakia	1:11	6 (0+0+1+5)	34:24.3	+3:46.2
42	41	Karoline Offigstad Knotten	Norway	2:09	2 (1+0+1+0)	34:28.6	+3:50.5
43	47	Lotte Lie	Belgium	2:20	1 (0+1+0+0)	34:34.1	+3:56.0
44	54	Clare Egan	United States	2:31	4 (1+0+1+2)	34:56.1	+4:18.0
45	52	Deedra Irwin	United States	2:27	3 (2+0+0+1)	35:03.7	+4:25.6
46	35	Megan Bankes	Canada	1:55	4 (1+2+1+0)	35:13.3	+4:35.2
47	29	Kamila Żuk	Poland	1:49	5 (0+2+3+0)	35:15.8	+4:37.7
48	5	Lisa Vittozzi	Italy	0:38	10 (4+2+3+1)	35:18.5	+4:40.4
49	49	Elena Kruchinkina	Belarus	2:23	6 (2+1+1+2)	35:20.2	+4:42.1
50	57	Elena Chirkova	Romania	2:34	1 (1+0+0+0)	35:22.8	+4:44.7
51	24	Irene Lardschneider	Italy	1:32	3 (0+2+1+0)	35:36.4	+4:58.3
52	60	Nadia Moser	Canada	2:48	2 (0+1+1+0)	35:44.7	+5:06.6
53	58	Mona Brorsson	Sweden	2:45	5 (1+1+1+2)	35:50.2	+5:12.1
54	53	Alina Stremous	Moldova	2:30	4 (1+1+1+1)	35:52.8	+5:14.7
55	55	Joanne Reid	United States	2:31	6 (0+2+3+1)	36:05.1	+5:27.0
56	59	Fuyuko Tachizaki	Japan	2:48	3 (2+1+0+0)	36:10.0	+5:31.9
57	43	Alla Ghilenko	Moldova	2:15	4 (0+0+3+1)	36:36.3	+5:58.2
58	48	Milena Todorova	Bulgaria	2:22	4 (0+0+3+1)	37:01.2	+6:23.1
59	45	Tuuli Tomingas	Estonia	2:17	4 (0+0+2+2)	37:23.6	+6:45.5
	50	Valentina Semerenko	Ukraine	2:25	(4+1)	Did not finish	
