= Biathlon World Championships 2019 – Mixed relay =

Mixed relay at the Biathlon World Championships 2019
- Venue: Östersund Ski Stadium
- Location: Östersund, Sweden
- Dates: 7 March
- Competitors: 104 from 26 nations
- Teams: 26
- Winning time: 1:17:41.4

Medalists
gold medal	Marte Olsbu Røiseland; Tiril Eckhoff; Johannes Thingnes Bø; Vetle Sjåstad Christiansen	Norway
silver medal	Vanessa Hinz; Denise Herrmann; Arnd Peiffer; Benedikt Doll	Germany
bronze medal	Lisa Vittozzi; Dorothea Wierer; Lukas Hofer; Dominik Windisch	Italy

The mixed relay competition at the Biathlon World Championships 2019 was held on 7 March 2019.

== Results ==
The race was started at 16:15.

Rank	Bib	Team	Time	Penalties (P+S)	Deficit
1st place, gold medalist(s)	4	Norway; Marte Olsbu Røiseland; Tiril Eckhoff; Johannes Thingnes Bø; Vetle Sjåstad Christiansen	1:17:41.4; 19:02.2; 19:48.3; 19:01.6; 19:49.3	0+3 0+4; 0+1 0+1; 0+2 0+1; 0+0 0+2; 0+0 0+0	
2nd place, silver medalist(s)	3	Germany; Vanessa Hinz; Denise Herrmann; Arnd Peiffer; Benedikt Doll	1:17:54.5; 19:27.8; 19:21.8; 19:17.9; 19:47.0	0+2 0+5; 0+0 0+2; 0+0 0+3; 0+1 0+1; 0+0 0+2	+13.1
3rd place, bronze medalist(s)	6	Italy; Lisa Vittozzi; Dorothea Wierer; Lukas Hofer; Dominik Windisch	1:18:51.0; 18:58.0; 19:52.8; 19:58.2; 20:02.0	0+6 0+8; 0+0 0+0; 0+2 0+2; 0+2 0+3; 0+2 0+3	+1:09.6
4	5	Russia; Evgeniya Pavlova; Ekaterina Yurlova-Percht; Dmitry Malyshko; Alexander Loginov	1:19:13.8; 20:01.4; 19:20.9; 20:05.4; 19:46.1	0+3 0+5; 0+0 0+1; 0+0 0+0; 0+1 0+3; 0+2 0+1	+1:32.4
5	7	Sweden; Linn Persson; Hanna Öberg; Jesper Nelin; Sebastian Samuelsson	1:19:16.7; 19:14.0; 19:54.7; 20:25.2; 19:42.8	0+4 0+6; 0+0 0+0; 0+1 0+0; 0+2 0+3; 0+1 0+3	+1:35.3
6	8	Czech Republic; Veronika Vítková; Markéta Davidová; Ondřej Moravec; Michal Krčmář	1:19:32.7; 19:54.3; 19:36.2; 19:52.2; 20:10.0	0+3 0+0; 0+2 0+0; 0+0 0+0; 0+0 0+0; 0+1 0+0	+1:51.3
7	11	Ukraine; Anastasiya Merkushyna; Vita Semerenko; Artem Pryma; Dmytro Pidruchnyi	1:20:08.6; 19:18.7; 21:02.7; 20:15.0; 19:32.2	0+3 0+7; 0+0 0+1; 0+1 0+3; 0+0 0+3; 0+2 0+0	+2:27.2
8	1	France; Anaïs Chevalier; Julia Simon; Simon Desthieux; Martin Fourcade	1:20:22.6; 20:16.8; 20:29.5; 19:36.5; 19:59.8	0+9 0+6; 0+2 0+1; 0+3 0+2; 0+1 0+3; 0+3 0+0	+2:41.2
9	22	Poland; Magdalena Gwizdoń; Kinga Zbylut; Grzegorz Guzik; Łukasz Szczurek	1:20:30.2; 19:54.7; 20:19.3; 20:17.7; 19:58.5	0+3 0+1; 0+1 0+1; 0+0 0+0; 0+2 0+0; 0+0 0+0	+2:48.8
10	19	Finland; Venla Lehtonen; Kaisa Mäkäräinen; Tero Seppälä; Olli Hiidensalo	1:20:34.6; 21:00.1; 19:34.0; 19:46.5; 20:14.0	0+3 0+2; 0+1 0+0; 0+1 0+0; 0+0 0+1; 0+1 0+1	+2:53.2
11	2	Switzerland; Elisa Gasparin; Lena Häcki; Benjamin Weger; Jeremy Finello	1:20:38.1; 19:59.5; 20:32.5; 19:51.9; 20:14.2	0+6 0+7; 0+2 0+1; 0+2 0+3; 0+2 0+1; 0+0 0+2	+2:56.7
12	20	Slovakia; Ivona Fialková; Paulína Fialková; Tomáš Hasilla; Martin Otčenáš	1:21:04.3; 19:22.3; 20:27.9; 20:31.8; 20:42.3	0+5 0+5; 0+0 0+0; 0+2 0+2; 0+0 0+1; 0+3 0+2	+3:22.9
13	15	Belarus; Hanna Sola; Elena Kruchinkina; Anton Smolski; Sergey Bocharnikov	1:21:38.8; 20:09.8; 20:34.2; 19:59.9; 20:54.9	0+3 0+5; 0+1 0+0; 0+2 0+2; 0+0 0+0; 0+0 0+3	+3:57.4
14	13	Estonia; Regina Oja; Johanna Talihärm; Rene Zahkna; Kalev Ermits	1:21:39.1; 20:33.5; 20:24.1; 20:08.3; 20:33.2	0+5 0+2; 0+2 0+2; 0+1 0+0; 0+0 0+0; 0+2 0+0	+3:57.7
15	16	Japan; Fuyuko Tachizaki; Sari Maeda; Tsukasa Kobonoki; Kosuke Ozaki	1:21:57.6; 19:40.5; 20:51.7; 20:34.1; 20:51.3	0+5 0+5; 0+0 0+0; 0+3 0+1; 0+0 0+2; 0+2 0+2	+4:16.2
16	9	Canada; Rosanna Crawford; Sarah Beaudry; Christian Gow; Scott Gow	1:22:16.9; 20:16.9; 20:45.0; 19:30.0; 21:45.0	1+5 0+3; 0+0 0+0; 0+2 0+0; 0+0 0+0; 1+3 0+3	+4:35.5
17	10	Austria; Christina Rieder; Katharina Innerhofer; Tobias Eberhard; Dominik Landertinger	1:22:27.1; 20:20.2; 21:07.2; 21:00.3; 19:59.4	0+2 1+4; 0+0 0+0; 0+1 1+3; 0+1 0+1; 0+0 0+0	+4:45.7
18	23	China; Zhang Yan; Chu Yuanmeng; Yan Xingyuan; Wang Wenqiang	1:24:46.5; 20:20.0; 21:33.1; 20:47.5; 22:05.9	0+6 0+3; 0+0 0+0; 0+3 0+1; 0+1 0+0; 0+2 0+2	+7:05.1
19	12	United States; Susan Dunklee; Clare Egan; Sean Doherty; Leif Nordgren	1:25:02.6; 19:53.1; 20:30.5; 19:56.6; 24:42.4	2+8 1+5; 0+3 0+2; 0+2 0+1; 0+0 0+0; 2+3 1+2	+7:21.2
20	24	South Korea; Anna Frolina; Ko Eun-jung; Timofey Lapshin; Choi Du-jin	LAP; 20:34.6; 23:18.0	0+5 0+2; 0+2 0+0; 0+3 0+1; 0+0 0+1	
21	14	Bulgaria; Daniela Kadeva; Emilia Yordanova; Krasimir Anev; Vladimir Iliev	LAP; 21:53.7; 22:17.9	2+8 0+4; 1+3 0+3; 1+3 0+0; 0+2 0+1	
22	17	Kazakhstan; Yelizaveta Belchenko; Lyudmila Akhatova; Timur Kuts; Vladislav Vitenko	LAP; 21:07.6; 22:35.7	0+3 0+6; 0+0 0+3; 0+2 0+2; 0+1 0+1	
23	25	Latvia; Baiba Bendika; Jūlija Matvijenko; Aleksandrs Patrijuks; Roberts Slotiņš	LAP; 19:53.9; 24:29.2	0+4 0+1; 0+1 0+1; 0+2 0+0; 0+1	
24	18	Lithuania; Natalija Kočergina; Gabrielė Leščinskaitė; Tomas Kaukėnas; Karol Dombrovski	LAP; 21:36.4	0+1 2+6; 0+1 1+3; 0+0 1+3	
25	21	Slovenia; Polona Klemenčič; Lea Einfalt; Klemen Bauer; Miha Dovžan	LAP; 21:43.0	1+6 3+6; 1+3 0+3; 0+3 3+3	
26	26	Romania; Enikő Márton; Ana Larisa Cotrus; George Buta; Cornel Puchianu	LAP; 21:44.2	0+3 0+3; 0+0 0+1; 0+3 0+2	
