= Biathlon World Championships 2021 – Women's relay =

Women's relay at the Biathlon World Championships 2021
- Location: Pokljuka, Slovenia
- Date: 20 February
- Competitors: 92 from 23 nations
- Teams: 23
- Winning time: 1:10:39.0

Medalists
gold medal	Ingrid Landmark Tandrevold; Tiril Eckhoff; Ida Lien; Marte Olsbu Røiseland	Norway
silver medal	Vanessa Hinz; Janina Hettich; Denise Herrmann; Franziska Preuß	Germany
bronze medal	Anastasiya Merkushyna; Yuliia Dzhima; Darya Blashko; Olena Pidhrushna	Ukraine

The Women's relay competition at the Biathlon World Championships 2021 was held on 20 February 2021.

== Results ==
The race was started at 11:45.

Rank	Bib	Team	Time	Penalties (P+S)	Deficit
1st place, gold medalist(s)	5	Norway Ingrid Landmark Tandrevold; Tiril Eckhoff; Ida Lien; Marte Olsbu Røiseland	1:10:39.0; 17:24.6; 17:18.7; 18:05.6; 17:50.1	0+6 0+5; 0+0 0+1; 0+2 0+1; 0+1 0+2; 0+3 0+1	
2nd place, silver medalist(s)	1	Germany Vanessa Hinz; Janina Hettich; Denise Herrmann; Franziska Preuß	1:10:47.8; 17:26.4; 18:17.5; 17:48.4; 17:15.5	0+5 0+0; 0+0 0+0; 0+2 0+0; 0+3 0+0; 0+0 0+0	+8.8
3rd place, bronze medalist(s)	8	Ukraine Anastasiya Merkushyna; Yuliia Dzhima; Darya Blashko; Olena Pidhrushna	1:10:48.2; 17:30.2; 17:38.5; 18:03.4; 17:36.1	0+3 0+4; 0+1 0+0; 0+1 0+2; 0+1 0+0; 0+0 0+2	+9.2
4	6	Belarus Iryna Kryuko; Dzinara Alimbekava; Hanna Sola; Elena Kruchinkina	1:11:07.8; 17:48.6; 17:19.8; 17:49.5; 18:09.9	0+5 0+3; 0+2 0+0; 0+0 0+0; 0+1 0+2; 0+2 0+1	+28.8
5	3	Sweden Johanna Skottheim; Linn Persson; Elvira Öberg; Hanna Öberg	1:11:26.9; 18:06.1; 17:41.0; 17:54.3; 17:45.5	0+7 0+2; 0+1 0+2; 0+3 0+0; 0+2 0+0; 0+1 0+0	+47.9
6	14	Poland Kinga Zbylut; Monika Hojnisz-Staręga; Kamila Żuk; Anna Mąka	1:11:31.1; 17:49.0; 17:20.1; 17:49.7; 18:32.3	0+2 0+4; 0+0 0+1; 0+0 0+0; 0+1 0+1; 0+1 0+2	+52.1
7	9	Austria Dunja Zdouc; Katharina Innerhofer; Julia Schwaiger; Lisa Hauser	1:11:43.3; 18:05.2; 17:48.5; 18:07.2; 17:42.4	0+8 0+7; 0+3 0+2; 0+2 0+3; 0+1 0+1; 0+2 0+1	+1:04.3
8	2	France Anaïs Bescond; Anaïs Chevalier-Bouchet; Chloé Chevalier; Julia Simon	1:11:54.2; 17:35.2; 17:39.9; 18:17.9; 18:21.2	0+3 0+2; 0+0 0+0; 0+0 0+1; 0+1 0+0; 0+2 0+1	+1:15.2
9	7	Italy Lisa Vittozzi; Michela Carrara; Federica Sanfilippo; Dorothea Wierer	1:12:07.1; 17:08.6; 18:41.4; 18:42.4; 17:34.7	0+6 0+3; 0+0 0+0; 0+3 0+1; 0+3 0+2; 0+0 0+0	+1:28.1
10	10	Czech Republic Jessica Jislová; Eva Puskarčíková; Markéta Davidová; Lucie Charvátová	1:12:19.4; 17:59.1; 18:30.2; 17:45.3; 18:04.8	0+3 0+3; 0+0 0+2; 0+1 0+0; 0+0 0+0; 0+2 0+1	+1:40.4
11	4	RBU Evgeniya Pavlova; Tatiana Akimova; Svetlana Mironova; Uliana Kaisheva	1:12:49.9; 17:46.7; 18:58.0; 17:46.7; 18:18.5	0+2 1+5; 0+0 0+0; 0+0 1+3; 0+1 0+1; 0+1 0+1	+2:10.9
12	11	Switzerland Aita Gasparin; Selina Gasparin; Elisa Gasparin; Lena Häcki	1:14:39.7; 18:06.6; 18:49.2; 18:42.7; 19:01.2	1+6 0+7; 0+1 0+1; 1+3 0+1; 0+0 0+2; 0+2 0+3	+4:00.7
13	12	United States Susan Dunklee; Joanne Reid; Clare Egan; Deedra Irwin	1:14:58.6; 17:59.9; 18:10.4; 18:39.7; 20:08.6	0+3 2+8; 0+1 0+0; 0+1 0+3; 0+1 0+2; 0+0 2+3	+4:19.6
14	15	Finland Suvi Minkkinen; Mari Eder; Erika Jänkä; Nastassia Kinnunen	1:15:25.8; 17:54.1; 17:53.7; 20:09.2; 19:28.8	0+2 1+5; 0+0 0+0; 0+2 0+0; 0+0 1+3; 0+0 0+2	+4:46.8
15	18	Japan Fuyuko Tachizaki; Sari Maeda; Yurie Tanaka; Asuka Hachisuka	1:15:37.0; 18:07.6; 18:21.0; 19:32.0; 19:36.4	0+3 0+3; 0+1 0+0; 0+0 0+2; 0+2 0+0; 0+0 0+1	+4:58.0
16	13	Canada Nadia Moser; Emma Lunder; Megan Bankes; Sarah Beaudry	1:16:27.3; 18:49.2; 18:31.9; 18:48.7; 20:17.5	0+7 1+7; 0+3 0+1; 0+2 0+1; 0+1 0+2; 0+1 1+3	+5:48.3
17	16	Estonia Regina Oja; Johanna Talihärm; Tuuli Tomingas; Kadri Lehtla	1:16:36.8; 19:13.9; 18:32.7; 19:05.3; 19:44.9	0+4 0+7; 0+3 0+2; 0+0 0+2; 0+1 0+2; 0+0 0+1	+5:57.8
18	21	Bulgaria Milena Todorova; Daniela Kadeva; Maria Zdravkova; Valentina Dimitrova	1:17:13.7; 17:34.6; 19:03.4; 20:09.8; 20:25.9	0+3 0+6; 0+0 0+2; 0+0 0+1; 0+2 0+1; 0+1 0+2	+6:34.7
19	22	Slovenia Polona Klemenčič; Lena Repinc; Živa Klemenčič; Lea Einfalt	1:17:38.3; 18:20.1; 18:37.0; 19:43.8; 20:57.4	2+6 1+6; 0+2 0+1; 0+1 0+0; 0+0 1+3; 2+3 0+2	+6:59.3
20	17	Kazakhstan Galina Vishnevskaya-Sheporenko; Lyudmila Akhatova; Yelizaveta Belchenko; Anastasiya Kondratyeva	1:17:49.4; 18:47.8; 19:48.3; 18:56.7; 20:16.6	0+3 0+4; 0+0 0+1; 0+0 0+0; 0+2 0+2; 0+1 0+1	+7:10.4
21	19	Slovakia Ivona Fialková; Paulína Fialková; Henrieta Horvátová; Veronika Machyniaková |valign=top|LAP; 19:12.2; 18:45.7; 19:49.1	0+3; 0+0 2+3; 0+1 1+3; 0+1 0+2; 0+1		
22	23	Latvia Sanita Buliņa; Annija Keita Sabule; Inese Golubeva; Baiba Bendika |valign=top|LAP; 20:08.2	1+3 0+1; 0+1 0+0		
23	20	South Korea Mun Ji-hee; Anna Frolina; Ekaterina Avvakumova; Kim Seon-su |valign=top|LAP; 21:02.9	3+3 0+0; 3+3		
