= Biathlon World Championships 2021 – Women's mass start =

Women's mass start at the Biathlon World Championships 2021
- Location: Pokljuka, Slovenia
- Date: 21 February
- Competitors: 30 from 15 nations
- Winning time: 36:05.7

Medalists
| gold medal | Lisa Theresa Hauser | Austria |
| silver medal | Ingrid Landmark Tandrevold | Norway |
| bronze medal | Tiril Eckhoff | Norway |

The Women's mass start competition at the Biathlon World Championships 2021 was held on 21 February 2021.

== Results ==
The race was started at 12:30.

| Rank | Bib | Name | Nationality | Penalties (P+P+S+S) | Time | Deficit |
|---|---|---|---|---|---|---|
| 1st place, gold medalist(s) | 4 | Lisa Theresa Hauser | Austria | 0 (0+0+0+0) | 36:05.7 | |
| 2nd place, silver medalist(s) | 7 | Ingrid Landmark Tandrevold | Norway | 1 (0+0+1+0) | 36:27.4 | +21.7 |
| 3rd place, bronze medalist(s) | 1 | Tiril Eckhoff | Norway | 3 (1+0+1+1) | 36:28.7 | +23.0 |
| 4 | 8 | Marte Olsbu Røiseland | Norway | 1 (0+1+0+0) | 36:29.3 | +23.6 |
| 5 | 24 | Lisa Vittozzi | Italy | 1 (0+1+0+0) | 36:54.6 | +48.9 |
| 6 | 10 | Franziska Preuß | Germany | 2 (1+0+1+0) | 36:58.3 | +52.6 |
| 7 | 5 | Hanna Öberg | Sweden | 2 (1+0+1+0) | 37:03.4 | +57.7 |
| 8 | 9 | Dorothea Wierer | Italy | 3 (1+0+1+1) | 37:11.0 | +1:05.3 |
| 9 | 28 | Baiba Bendika | Latvia | 2 (0+0+0+2) | 37:20.0 | +1:14.3 |
| 10 | 19 | Vanessa Hinz | Germany | 1 (0+0+1+0) | 37:26.9 | +1:21.2 |
| 11 | 14 | Linn Persson | Sweden | 3 (0+1+1+1) | 37:32.2 | +1:26.5 |
| 12 | 20 | Olena Pidhrushna | Ukraine | 2 (0+0+1+1) | 37:42.2 | +1:36.5 |
| 13 | 2 | Markéta Davidová | Czech Republic | 2 (0+1+1+0) | 37:49.4 | +1:43.7 |
| 14 | 11 | Elvira Öberg | Sweden | 3 (1+1+1+0) | 38:00.6 | +1:54.9 |
| 15 | 16 | Lena Häcki | Switzerland | 3 (1+0+1+1) | 38:12.3 | +2:06.6 |
| 16 | 13 | Julia Simon | France | 4 (3+0+0+1) | 38:23.5 | +2:17.8 |
| 17 | 27 | Emma Lunder | Canada | 3 (0+1+2+0) | 38:26.3 | +2:20.6 |
| 18 | 17 | Selina Gasparin | Switzerland | 4 (0+2+1+1) | 38:26.6 | +2:20.9 |
| 19 | 25 | Svetlana Mironova | RBU | 6 (0+1+4+1) | 38:27.5 | +2:21.8 |
| 20 | 26 | Irina Kazakevich | RBU | 4 (0+0+2+2) | 38:31.0 | +2:25.3 |
| 21 | 22 | Elisa Gasparin | Switzerland | 3 (0+0+2+1) | 38:44.3 | +2:38.6 |
| 22 | 21 | Monika Hojnisz-Staręga | Poland | 4 (1+2+1+0) | 38:44.6 | +2:38.9 |
| 23 | 30 | Anaïs Bescond | France | 3 (1+0+1+1) | 39:01.2 | +2:55.5 |
| 24 | 18 | Ida Lien | Norway | 4 (0+1+2+1) | 39:13.0 | +3:07.3 |
| 25 | 29 | Susan Dunklee | United States | 3 (0+2+0+1) | 39:17.0 | +3:11.3 |
| 26 | 12 | Dzinara Alimbekava | Belarus | 7 (4+1+0+2) | 39:18.0 | +3:12.3 |
| 27 | 3 | Anaïs Chevalier-Bouchet | France | 5 (2+2+1+0) | 39:37.0 | +3:31.3 |
| 28 | 15 | Justine Braisaz-Bouchet | France | 7 (2+2+2+1) | 40:20.5 | +4:14.8 |
| 29 | 23 | Darya Blashko | Ukraine | 6 (2+1+0+3) | 41:05.9 | +5:00.2 |
| 30 | 6 | Hanna Sola | Belarus | 11 (3+3+4+1) | 42:03.6 | +5:57.9 |
