= Denise Herrmann-Wick =

German cross-country skier

Denise Herrmann
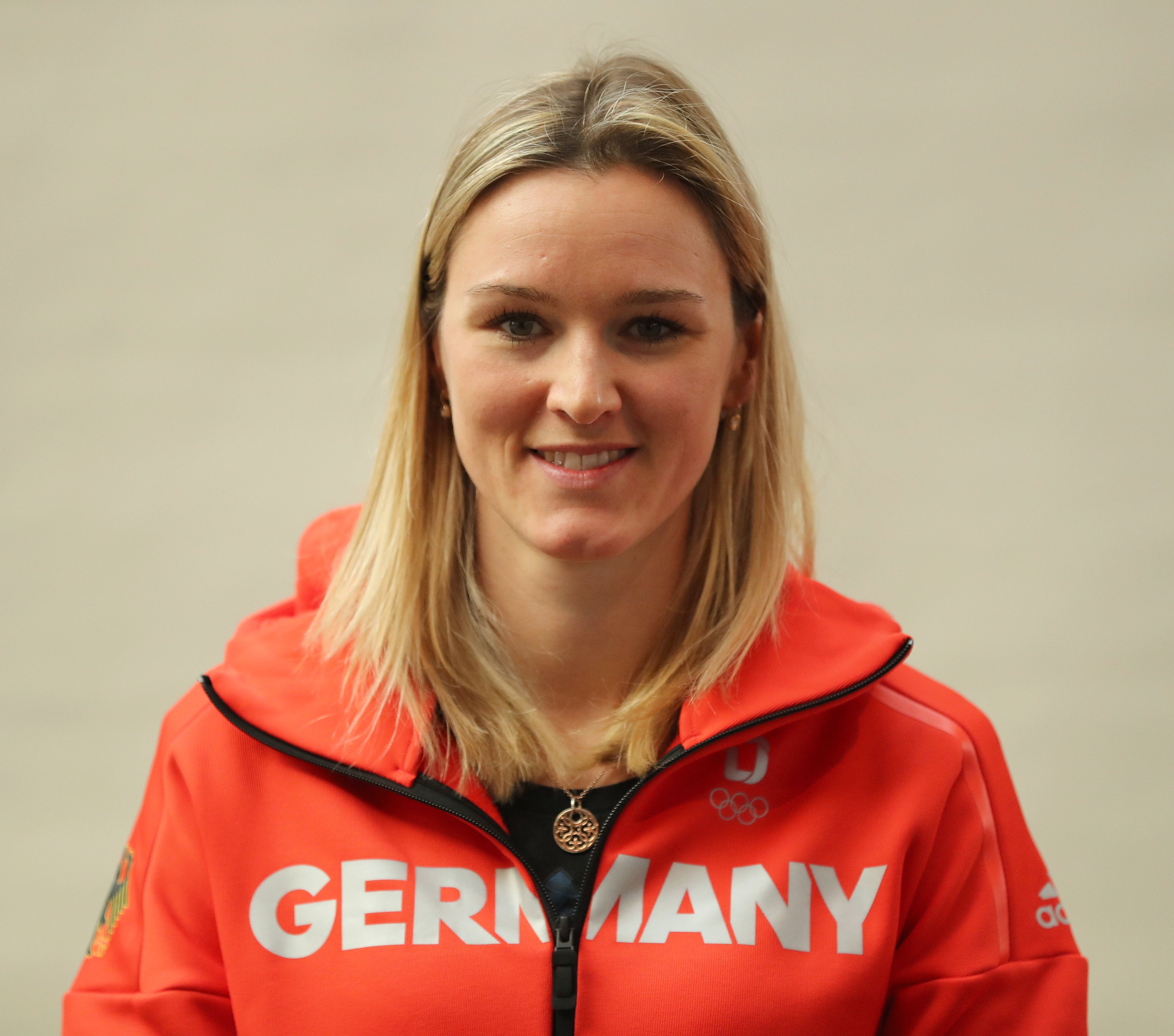
- Herrmann in 2018

Personal information
- Nationality: German
- Born: 20 December 1988 (age 37) Schlema, East Germany
- Height: 1.75 m (5 ft 9 in)

Sport

Professional information
- Club: WSC Erzgebirge Oberwiesenthal

Olympic Games
- Teams: 2 (2018, 2022)
- Medals: 2 (1 gold)

World Championships
- Teams: 4 (2019-2023)
- Medals: 8 (2 gold)

World Cup
- Seasons: 7 (2016/17–2022/2023)
- Individual victories: 12
- All victories: 16
- Individual podiums: 23
- All podiums: 40
- Overall titles: 0
- Discipline titles: 2: 2 Sprint (2019–20), (2022–23)
Medal record
Representing Germany
Women's cross-country skiing
Olympic Games
Bronze medal – third place	2014 Sochi	4 × 5 km relay
U23 World Championships
Silver medal – second place	2010 Hinterzarten	Individual sprint
Junior World Championships
Bronze medal – third place	2007 Tarvisio	Individual sprint
Women's biathlon
Olympic Games
Gold medal – first place	2022 Beijing	15 km individual
Bronze medal – third place	2022 Beijing	4 × 6 km relay
Biathlon World Championships
Gold medal – first place	2019 Östersund	10 km pursuit
Gold medal – first place	2023 Oberhof	7.5 km sprint
Silver medal – second place	2019 Östersund	Mixed relay
Silver medal – second place	2020 Antholz	10 km pursuit
Silver medal – second place	2020 Antholz	4 × 6 km relay
Silver medal – second place	2021 Pokljuka	4 × 6 km relay
Silver medal – second place	2023 Oberhof	10 km pursuit
Silver medal – second place	2023 Oberhof	4 × 6 km relay
Bronze medal – third place	2019 Östersund	12.5 km mass start

Denise Herrmann-Wick (née Herrmann; born 20 December 1988) is a German former biathlete and cross-country skier. She won gold at 2022 Winter Olympics – Women's individual, won gold at Biathlon World Championships 2019 – Women's pursuit and won gold at Biathlon World Championships 2023 – Women's sprint. Previously, she has competed in FIS Cross-Country World Cup since 2009. Herrmann has won several medals at the World Cup events. In April 2016, she announced that she would switch to competing in biathlon for the following season, although in an interview in November of that year, she did not rule out competing in cross-country skiing in the future.

On 14 March 2023, she announced her retirement following the 2022–2023 season.

== Cross-country skiing results ==
All results are sourced from the International Ski Federation (FIS).

=== Olympic Games ===
- 1 medal – (1 bronze)

Year	Age	10 km individual	15 km skiathlon	30 km mass start	Sprint	4 × 5 km relay	Team sprint
2014	25	—	—	—	8	Bronze	4

=== World Championships ===
Year	Age	10 km individual	15 km skiathlon	30 km mass start	Sprint	4 × 5 km relay	Team sprint
2011	22	43	—	39	23	—	—
2013	24	24	—	—	10	7	8
2015	26	—	—	—	17	6	4

=== World Cup ===
==== Season standings ====
Season	Age	Discipline standings			Ski Tour standings			
Season	Age	Overall	Distance	Sprint	Nordic Opening	Tour de Ski	World Cup Final	Ski Tour Canada
2009	21	NC	—	NC	—N/a	—	—	—N/a
2010	22	124	NC	87	—N/a	DNF	—	—N/a
2011	23	41	44	23	30	DNF	DNF	—N/a
2012	24	39	41	28	45	DNF	35	—N/a
2013	25	13	17	11	DNF	13	31	—N/a
2014	26	9	18	2nd place, silver medalist(s)	8	DNF	31	—N/a
2015	27	9	16	13	14	8	—N/a	—N/a
2016	28	22	29	12	29	22	—N/a	28
2017	29	90	—	54	—	—	—	—N/a

==== Individual podiums ====
- 6 podiums – (3 WC, 3 SWC)

No.	Season	Date	Location	Race	Level	Place
1	2013–14	29 November 2013	Rukatunturi, Finland	1.4 km Sprint C	Stage World Cup	3rd
2	2013–14	15 December 2013	Davos, Switzerland	1.5 km Sprint F	World Cup	3rd
3	2013–14	29 December 2013	Oberhof, Germany	1.5 km Sprint F	Stage World Cup	2nd
4	2013–14	31 December 2013	Lenzerheide, Switzerland	1.5 km Sprint F	Stage World Cup	3rd
5	2013–14	18 January 2014	Szklarska Poręba, Poland	1.5 km Sprint F	World Cup	2nd
6	2013–14	2 February 2014	Toblach, Italy	1.3 km Sprint F	World Cup	2nd

==== World Cup team podiums ====
- 2 podiums – (2 TS)

No.	Season	Date	Location	Race	Level	Place	Teammate
1	2012–13	7 December 2012	Quebec City, Canada	6 × 1.6 km Team Sprint F	World Cup	2nd	Kolb
2	2013–14	22 December 2013	Asiago, Italy	6 × 1.25 km Team Sprint C	World Cup	2nd	Zeller

== Biathlon results ==
All results are sourced from the International Biathlon Union.

=== Olympic Games ===
2 medals (1 gold, 1 bronze)

Year	Age	Individual	Sprint	Pursuit	Mass start	Relay	Mixed relay	Single mixed relay
(South Korea) 2018 Pyeongchang	29	—	21st	6th	11th	8th	—	—N/a
(China) 2022 Beijing	33	Gold	22nd	17th	13th	Bronze	5th	—N/a

=== World Championships ===
9 medals (2 gold, 6 silver, 1 bronze)

Year	Age	Individual	Sprint	Pursuit	Mass start	Relay	Mixed relay	Single mixed relay
(Sweden) 2019 Östersund	30	—	6th	Gold	Bronze	4th	Silver	4th
(Italy) 2020 Antholz	31	12th	5th	Silver	12th	Silver	4th	—
(Slovenia) 2021 Pokljuka	32	15th	4th	8th	—	Silver	7th	—
(Germany) 2023 Oberhof	34	15th	Gold	Silver	24th	Silver	6th	—

*During Olympic seasons competitions are only held for those events not included in the Olympic program.
**The single mixed relay was added as an event in 2019.

=== World Cup ===
Season	Age	Overall		Individual		Sprint		Pursuit		Mass start	
Season	Age	Points	Position	Points	Position	Points	Position	Points	Position	Points	Position
2016–17	28	114	48th	0	–	79	40th	35	52nd	0	–
2017–18	29	477	12th	19	40th	149	14th	197	7th	112	15th
2018–19	30	570	8th	39	29th	170	15th	254	6th	148	9th
2019–20	31	745	3rd	112	4th	314	1st	155	5th	164	6th
2020–21	32	667	10th	80	6th	238	9th	197	9th	106	14th
2021–22	33	589	6th	48	9th	274	6th	161	11th	106	10th
2022–23	34	874	4th	126	7th	400	1st	272	5th	76	18th

=== Individual victories ===
- 13 victories (7 Sp, 4 Pu, 2 In)
- 22 podiums (7 Sp, 8 Pu, 5 In, 2 Ms)

No.	Season	Date	Location	Race	Level
1	2017–18	1 December 2017	Östersund, Sweden	7.5 km Sprint	World Cup
2	2017–18	3 December 2017	Östersund, Sweden	10 km Pursuit	World Cup
3	2018–19	16 February 2019	Salt Lake City, United States	10 km Pursuit	World Cup
4	2018–19	10 March 2019	Östersund, Sweden	10 km Pursuit	World Championships
5	2019–20	24 January 2020	Pokljuka, Slovenia	15 km Individual	World Cup
6	2019–20	5 March 2020	Nové Město, Czech Republic	7.5 km Sprint	World Cup
7	2019–20	13 March 2020	Kontiolahti, Finland	7.5 km Sprint	World Cup
8	2021–22	7 February 2022	Beijing, China	15 km Individual	Winter Olympic Games
9	2021–22	5 March 2022	Kontiolahti, Finland	7.5 km Sprint	World Cup
10	2022–23	8 December 2022	Hochfilzen, Austria	7.5 km Sprint	World Cup
11	2022–23	21 January 2023	Antholz-Anterselva, Italy	10 km Pursuit	World Cup
12	2022–23	10 February 2023	Oberhof, Germany	7.5 km Sprint	World Championships
13	2022–23	19 March 2023	Oslo Holmenkollen, Norway	7.5 km Sprint	World Cup

=== Relay victories ===
No.	Season	Date	Location	Level	Teammate
1	2016–17	5 March 2017	(South Korea) Pyeongchang, Korea	World Cup	Horchler, Hammerschmidt, Hildebrand
2	2017–18	13 January 2018	Ruhpolding, Germany	World Cup	Preuss, Hildebrand, Dahlmeier
3	2018–19	8 February 2019	Canmore, Canada	World Cup	Hinz, Hildebrand, Dahlmeier
4	2020–21	16 January 2021	Oberhof, Germany	World Cup	Hinz, Preuss, Hettich-Walz

== Awards and recognition ==
Herrmann-Wick has received the following awards:

- German Sportspersonality of the Year (2023)
