= Lukas Hofer =

Italian biathlete (born 1989)

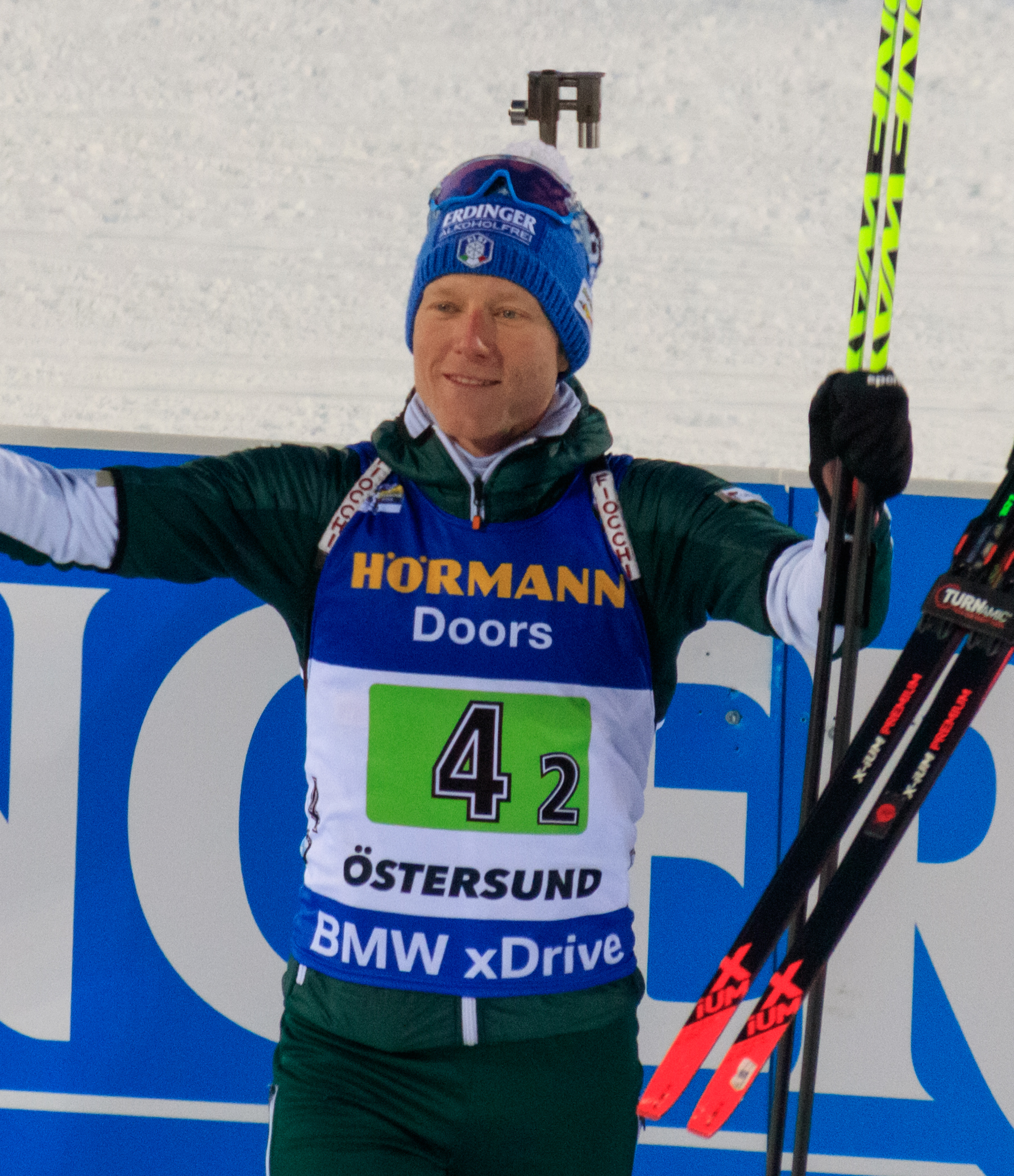
- Hofer during the World Championships in Östersund, Sweden, in March 2019

Personal information
- Nationality: Italian
- Born: 30 September 1989 (age 36) Bruneck, Italy
- Height: 1.74 m (5 ft 9 in)
- Weight: 69 kg (152 lb)

Sport

Professional information
- Sport: Biathlon
- Club: C.S. Carabinieri
- World Cup debut: 2009

Olympic Games
- Teams: 5 (2010–2026)
- Medals: 3 (0 gold)

World Championships
- Teams: 8 (2011–2020)
- Medals: 4 (0 gold)

World Cup
- Seasons: 2009/10-
- Individual victories: 2
- Individual podiums: 9
Medal record
Men's biathlon
Representing Italy
Olympic Games
Silver medal – second place	2026 Milano Cortina	Mixed relay
Bronze medal – third place	2014 Sochi	Mixed relay
Bronze medal – third place	2018 Pyeongchang	Mixed relay
World Championships
Silver medal – second place	2011 Khanty-Mansiysk	15 km mass start
Silver medal – second place	2019 Östersund	Single mixed relay
Silver medal – second place	2020 Antholz	Mixed relay
Bronze medal – third place	2019 Östersund	Mixed relay
Junior World Championships
Gold medal – first place	2009 Canmore	10 km sprint
Gold medal – first place	2009 Canmore	12.5 km pursuit
Youth World Championships
Bronze medal – third place	2008 Ruhpolding	3 × 7.5 km relay
European Championships
Bronze medal – third place	2011 Ridnaun	10 km sprint
- Updated on 19 March 2021

Lukas Hofer (born 30 September 1989) is an Italian biathlete.

== Career ==
Hofer competed for Italy at the 2010 Winter Olympics in biathlon. Together with Karin Oberhofer, Dorothea Wierer and Dominik Windisch he won a bronze medal in the Mixed relay at the 2014 Winter Olympics, in Sochi, Russia. Then four years later at the 2018 Winter Olympics in Pyeongchang County, South Korea together with Lisa Vittozzi, Dorothea Wierer and Dominik Windisch, he once again won a bronze medal in the Mixed relay.

Further notable results

- 2007: 3rd, Italian Biathlon Championships, sprint
- 2008: 1st, Italian Biathlon Championships, mass start
- 2009: 3rd, Italian Biathlon Championships, mass start
- 2011:
  - 1st, Italian Biathlon Championships, sprint
  - 1st, Italian Biathlon Championships, mass start
- 2012:
  - 3rd, Italian Biathlon Championships, sprint
  - 3rd, Italian Biathlon Championships, pursuit

== Biathlon results ==
All results are sourced from the International Biathlon Union.

=== Olympic Games ===
3 medals (1 silver, 2 bronze)

Event	Individual	Sprint	Pursuit	Mass Start	Relay	Mixed Relay
(Canada) 2010 Vancouver	46th	56th	54th	–	12th	—
(Russia) 2014 Sochi	14th	12th	17th	DNF	5th	Bronze
(South Korea) 2018 Pyeongchang	63rd	10th	10th	18th	12th	Bronze
(China) 2022 Beijing	27th	14th	4th	27th	7th	9th
(Italy) 2026 Milano Cortina	16th	13th	13th	25th	14th	Silver

=== World Championships ===
4 medals (2 silver, 2 bronze)

Event	Individual	Sprint	Pursuit	Mass start	Relay	Mixed relay	Single mixed relay
(Russia) 2011 Khanty-Mansiysk	27th	16th	9th	Silver	5th	5th	—N/a
(Germany) 2012 Ruhpolding	20th	31st	13th	16th	4th	9th	—N/a
(Czech Republic) 2013 Nové Město	7th	14th	11th	21st	7th	4th	—N/a
(Finland) 2015 Kontiolahti	50th	24th	30th	—	12th	7th	—N/a
(Norway) 2016 Oslo Holmenkollen	31st	75th	—	—	11th	8th	—N/a
(Austria) 2017 Hochfilzen	36th	56th	DNS	—	5th	4th	—N/a
(Sweden) 2019 Östersund	5th	52rd	42rd	17th	15th	Bronze	Silver
(Italy) 2020 Antholz-Anterselva	13th	21st	20th	18th	7th	Silver	9th
(Slovenia) 2021 Pokljuka	18th	13th	14th	7th	6th	6th	5th
(Germany) 2023 Oberhof	72nd	28th	35th	—	7th	—	—
(Czech Republic) 2024 Nové Město na Moravě	24th	18th	9th	19th	6th	—	—
(Switzerland) 2025 Lenzerheide	70th	16th	20th	8th	5th	7th	—

*During Olympic seasons competitions are only held for those events not included in the Olympic program.
**The single mixed relay was added as an event in 2019.

=== World Cup ===
==== Individual podiums ====
- 2 victories (2 Sp)
- 13 podiums

No.	Season	Date	Event	Competition	Level	Place
1	2010–11	12 March 2011	(Russia) Khanty-Mansiysk	15 km Mass Start	Biathlon World Championships	2nd
2	2011–12	7 January 2012	(Germany) Oberhof	10 km Sprint	Biathlon World Cup	3rd
3	2012–13	15 March 2013	(Russia) Khanty-Mansiysk	10 km Sprint	Biathlon World Cup	2nd
4	2013–14	17 January 2014	(Italy) Antholz-Anterselva	10 km Sprint	Biathlon World Cup	1st
5	2017–18	17 March 2018	(Norway) Oslo Holmenkollen	12.5 km Pursuit	Biathlon World Cup	2nd
6	2017–18	24 March 2018	(Russia) Tyumen	12.5 km Pursuit	Biathlon World Cup	3rd
7	2018–19	12 January 2019	(Germany) Oberhof	12.5 km Pursuit	Biathlon World Cup	3rd
8	2018–19	22 March 2019	(Norway) Oslo Holmenkollen	10 km Sprint	Biathlon World Cup	2nd
9	2020–21	11 March 2021	(Czech Republic) Nové Město	10 km Sprint	Biathlon World Cup	3rd
10	2020–21	19 March 2021	(Sweden) Östersund	10 km Sprint	Biathlon World Cup	1st
11	2020–21	20 March 2021	(Sweden) Östersund	12.5 km Pursuit	Biathlon World Cup	3rd
12	2021–22	6 March 2022	(Finland) Kontiolahti	12.5 km Pursuit	Biathlon World Cup	3rd
13	2025–26	22 January 2026	(Czech Republic) Nové Město	15 km Short Individual	Biathlon World Cup	3rd

*Results are from IBU races which include the Biathlon World Cup, Biathlon World Championships and the Winter Olympic Games.

=== Junior/Youth World Championships ===
Event	Individual	Sprint	Pursuit	Relay
(Italy) 2007 Martell-Val Martello	23rd	29th	22nd	–
(Germany) 2008 Ruhpolding	4th	15th	4th	–
(Canada) 2009 Canmore	44th	Gold	Gold	7th
