= Tomáš Hasilla =

Slovak biathlete (born 1990)

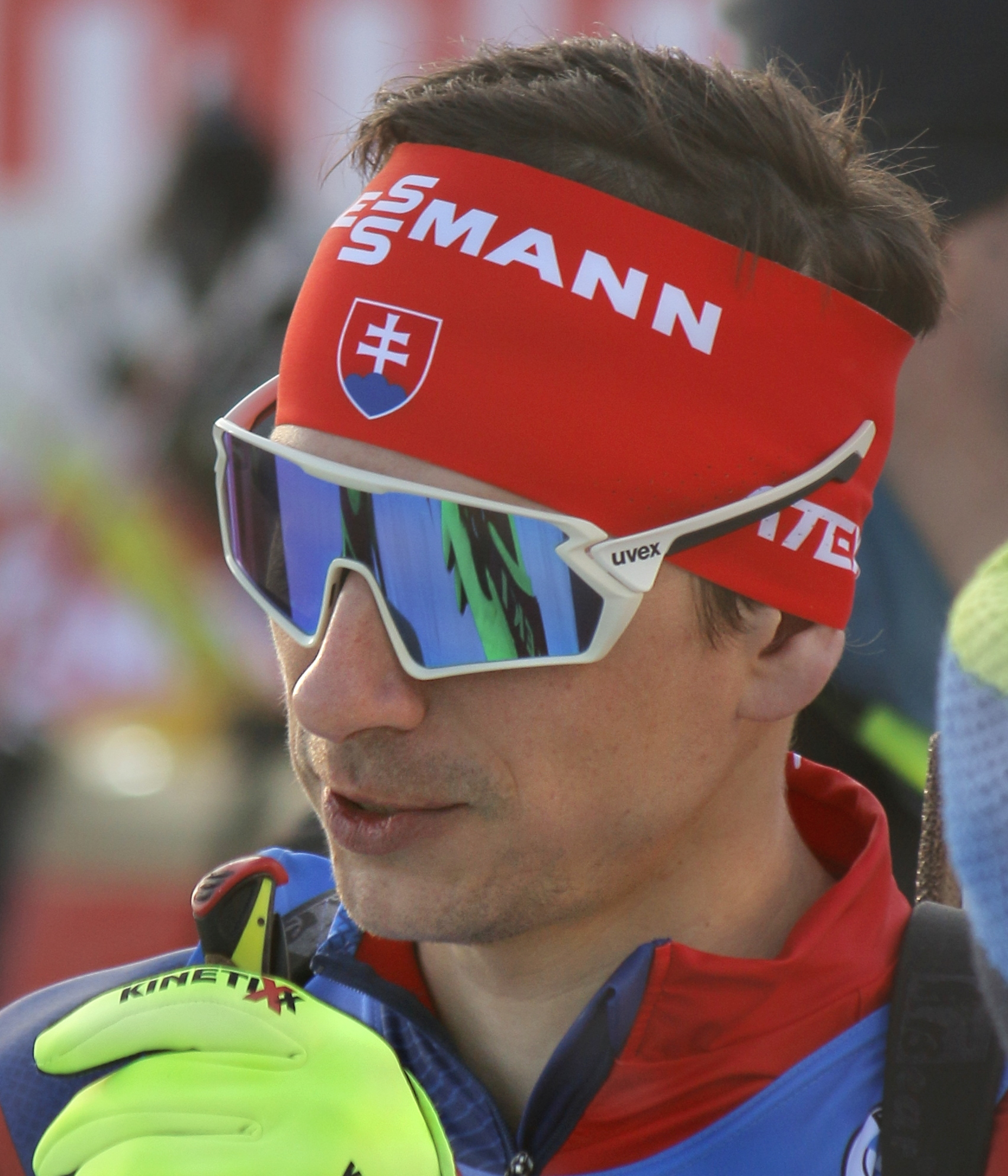
- Hasilla in 2023

Personal information
- Born: August 23, 1990 Brezno, Czechoslovakia
- Height: 5 ft 11 in (180 cm)

Sport
- Sport: Skiing
- Updated on 26 November 2017

Tomáš Hasilla (born 23 August 1990) is a Slovak biathlete. He competed at the 2014 Winter Olympics in Sochi, in sprint and individual.

== Biathlon results ==
All results are sourced from the International Biathlon Union.

=== Olympic Games ===
0 medals

| Event | Individual | Sprint | Pursuit | Mass start | Relay | Mixed relay |
|---|---|---|---|---|---|---|
| (Russia) 2014 Sochi | 42nd | 65th | — | — | 12th | — |
| (South Korea) 2018 Pyeongchang | 86th | 70th | — | — | 18th | — |

=== World Championships ===
0 medals

| Event | Individual | Sprint | Pursuit | Mass start | Relay | Mixed relay | Single Mixed relay |
|---|---|---|---|---|---|---|---|
| (Finland) 2015 Kontiolahti | — | 75th | — | — | 11th | 17th | — |
| (Norway) 2016 Oslo | — | 62nd | — | — | 12th | — | — |
| (Austria) 2017 Hochfilzen | 60th | 16th | 43rd | — | 12th | 12th | — |
| (Sweden) 2019 Östersund | — | 39th | 56th | — | 18th | 12th | 24th |
| (Italy) 2020 Rasen-Antholz | — | 94th | — | — | 17th | — | 26th |
| (Slovenia) 2021 Pokljuka | 54th | 68th | — | — | 17th | 18th | 21st |

*During Olympic seasons competitions are only held for those events not included in the Olympic program.
**The single mixed relay was added as an event in 2019.
