= Karolin Horchler =

German biathlete

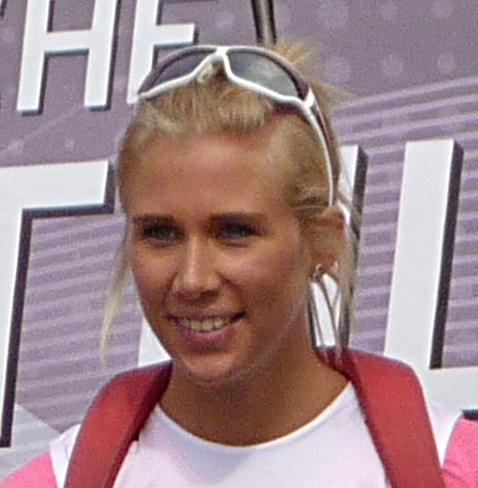

Personal information
- Nationality: German
- Born: 9 May 1989 (age 37) Bad Arolsen, Germany
- Height: 1.72 m (5 ft 8 in)
- Weight: 56 kg (123 lb)

Sport

Professional information
- Sport: Biathlon
- Club: WSF Clausthal-Zellerfeld
- World Cup debut: 2014

World Championships
- Teams: 1 (2020)
- Medals: 1 (0 gold)

World Cup
- Seasons: 6 (2014/15–)
- Individual victories: 0
- All victories: 0
- Individual podiums: 0
- All podiums: 3
- Overall titles: 0
- Discipline titles: 0
Medal record
Women's biathlon
Representing Germany
World Championships
Silver medal – second place	2020 Antholz	4 x 6 km relay
Junior World Championships
Silver medal – second place	2010 Torsby	12.5 km individual
European Championships
Gold medal – first place	2013 Bansko	4 × 6 km relay
Silver medal – second place	2014 Nové Město	4 × 6 km relay
Silver medal – second place	2015 Otepää	4 × 6 km relay
Silver medal – second place	2016 Tyumen	7.5 km sprint
Silver medal – second place	2016 Tyumen	10 km pursuit
Bronze medal – third place	2013 Bansko	10 km pursuit

Karolin Horchler (born 9 May 1989) is a German biathlete. She competed at the Biathlon World Championships 2020.

Her older sister Nadine is also a biathlete.

== Biathlon results ==
All results are sourced from the International Biathlon Union.

=== World Championships ===
1 medal (1 silver)

Event	Individual	Sprint	Pursuit	Mass start	Relay	Mixed relay	Single mixed relay
(Italy) 2020 Antholz	26th	23rd	15th	13th	Silver	—	—

*During Olympic seasons competitions are only held for those events not included in the Olympic program.
