= Tiril Eckhoff =

Norwegian biathlete (born 1990)

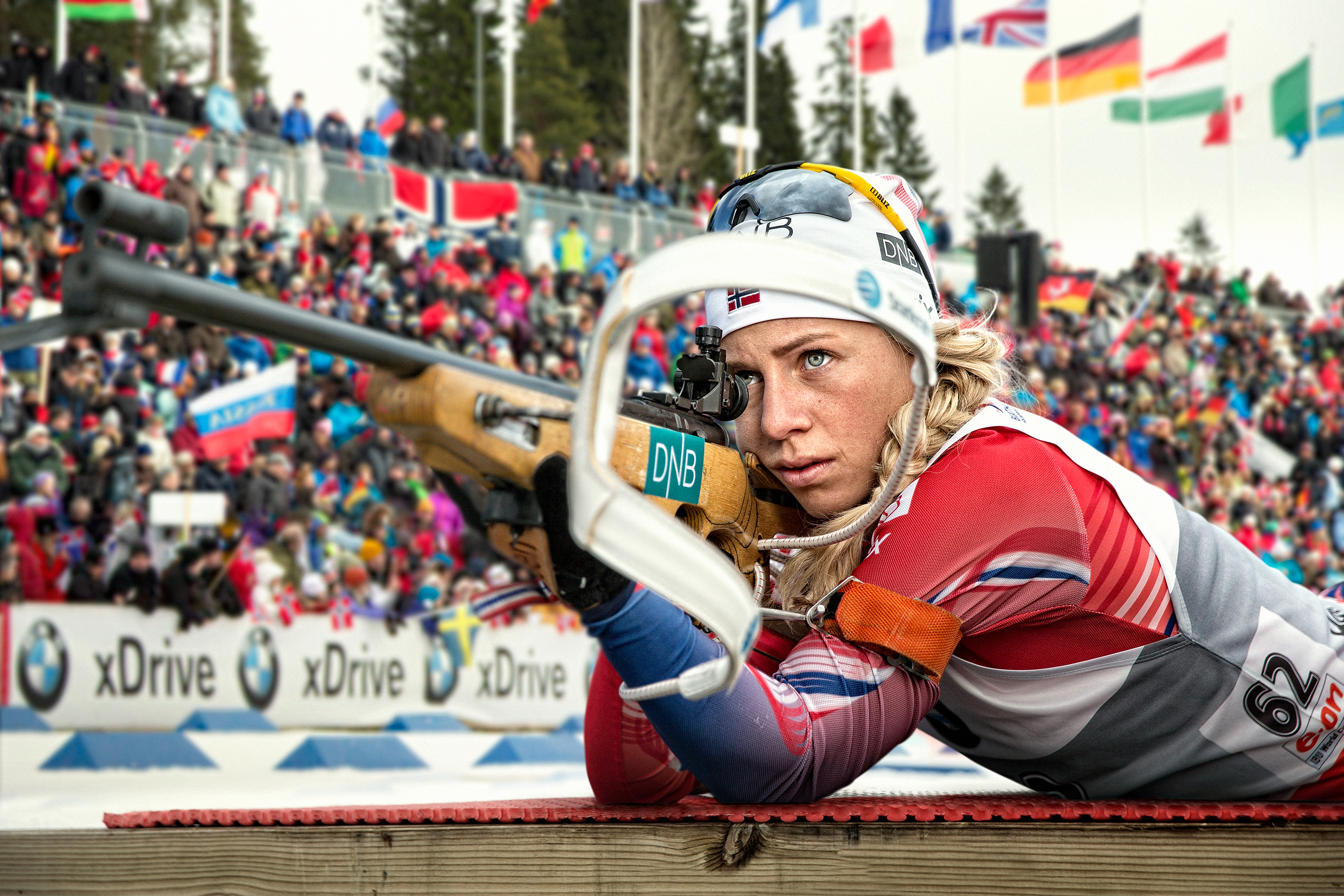

Personal information
- Full name: Tiril Kampenhaug Eckhoff
- Nationality: Norwegian
- Born: 21 May 1990 (age 36) Bærum, Norway
- Height: 1.63 m (5 ft 4 in)
- Weight: 59 kg (130 lb)

Sport

Professional information
- Sport: Biathlon
- Club: Fossum IF
- World Cup debut: 2011

Olympic Games
- Teams: 3 (2014, 2018, 2022)
- Medals: 8 (2 gold)

World Championships
- Teams: 5 (2015–2021)
- Medals: 15 (10 gold)

World Cup
- Seasons: 13 (2010/2011-2022/2023)
- All races: 286
- Individual victories: 28
- All victories: 50
- Individual podiums: 48
- All podiums: 87
- Overall titles: 1 (2020–21)
- Discipline titles: 3: 1 Sprint (2020–21); 2 Pursuit (2019–20, 2020–21)
Medal record
Women's biathlon
Representing Norway
Olympic Games
Gold medal – first place	2014 Sochi	Mixed relay
Gold medal – first place	2022 Beijing	Mixed relay
Silver medal – second place	2014 Sochi	4 × 6 km relay
Silver medal – second place	2018 Pyeongchang	Mixed relay
Silver medal – second place	2022 Beijing	12.5 km mass start
Bronze medal – third place	2014 Sochi	12.5 km mass start
Bronze medal – third place	2018 Pyeongchang	12.5 km mass start
Bronze medal – third place	2022 Beijing	10 km pursuit
World Championships
Gold medal – first place	2016 Oslo	7.5 km sprint
Gold medal – first place	2016 Oslo	4 × 6 km relay
Gold medal – first place	2019 Östersund	Mixed relay
Gold medal – first place	2019 Östersund	4 × 6 km relay
Gold medal – first place	2020 Antholz	4 x 6 km relay
Gold medal – first place	2020 Antholz	Mixed relay
Gold medal – first place	2021 Pokljuka	7.5 km sprint
Gold medal – first place	2021 Pokljuka	10 km pursuit
Gold medal – first place	2021 Pokljuka	4 x 6 km relay
Gold medal – first place	2021 Pokljuka	Mixed relay
Silver medal – second place	2019 Östersund	10 km pursuit
Silver medal – second place	2021 Pokljuka	Single mixed relay
Bronze medal – third place	2015 Kontiolahti	Mixed relay
Bronze medal – third place	2016 Oslo	Mixed relay
Bronze medal – third place	2021 Pokljuka	12.5 km mass start

Tiril Kampenhaug Eckhoff (born 21 May 1990) is a Norwegian former biathlete.

Eckhoff is a two-time Olympic champion, winning the mixed relay at the 2014 Sochi Winter Olympics and 2022 Winter Olympics, and also won a bronze in the mass start, a feat she repeated at the 2018 Winter Olympics. Eckhoff is also a ten-time gold medalist at the Biathlon World Championships, winning gold in the 7.5 km sprint at the Biathlon World Championships 2016, and both the 7.5 km sprint and 10 km pursuit at the Biathlon World Championships 2021. She is the sister of fellow biathlete Stian Eckhoff.

== Career ==
Eckhoff has been part of the Norwegian biathlon team since 2008.

Eckhoff competed in Biathlon at the 2014 Winter Olympics in Sochi, where she won 3 medals. Bronze in the mass start and in the women's relay and gold in the mixed relay together with Tora Berger, Ole Einar Bjørndalen and Emil Hegle Svendsen. She is the sister of former biathlete Stian Eckhoff and studied engineering at the Norwegian Institute of Technology.

In 2016, she became World Champion on 7.5 km sprint in her home arena, Holmenkollen, in Norway. She was also part of the Norwegian team who took the bronze medal in the mixed relay and played an instrumental part in the Norwegian women's relay gold medal, shooting 10/10 as the third skier.

In the 19–20 season, she won seven World Cup races, but she finished second in the Overall, behind Dorothea Wierer. She won her first-ever discipline title in pursuit.

In the 20–21 season, she won 4 gold and took 6 medals in 7 races during the Biathlon World Championships 2021. Later in the season, she won the 2020–21 World Cup overall title, winning the most races in a season since Magdalena Forsberg. She also won the discipline title in sprint and pursuit, becoming the first male or female biathlete to win seven consecutive races in a discipline (sprint competition).

She was awarded the Holmenkollen Medal in 2022.

Eckhoff did not participate in the 2022–23 Biathlon World Cup due to persistent health issues resulting from a Covid infection she contracted at the 2021/2022 end-of-season party. On March 15, 2023, she announced through her social media that she would not return to competition. Eckhoff later confirmed in a 2025 German television documentary on life after biathlon that long Covid and the powerful medications needed to treat her persistent sleep problems forced her retirement. This left her with "no formal education." "It was really a tough time."

== Biathlon results ==
All results are sourced from the International Biathlon Union.

=== Olympic Games ===
8 medals (2 gold, 3 silver, 3 bronze)

Year	Individual	Sprint	Pursuit	Mass start	Relay	Mixed relay
(Russia) 2014 Sochi	18th	18th	24th	Bronze	Silver	Gold
(South Korea) 2018 Pyeongchang	23rd	24th	9th	Bronze	4th	Silver
(China) 2022 Beijing	22nd	11th	Bronze	Silver	4th	Gold

*The mixed relay was added as an event in 2014.

=== World Championships ===
15 medals (10 gold, 2 silver, 3 bronze)

Year	Individual	Sprint	Pursuit	Mass start	Relay	Mixed relay	Single mixed relay
(Finland) 2015 Kontiolahti	52nd	19th	18th	16th	5th	Bronze	—N/a
(Norway) 2016 Oslo	43rd	Gold	17th	24th	Gold	Bronze	—N/a
(Austria) 2017 Hochfilzen	39th	13th	30th	12th	11th	8th	—N/a
(Sweden) 2019 Östersund	37th	9th	Silver	5th	Gold	Gold	—
(Italy) 2020 Antholz-Anterselva	15th	59th	20th	7th	Gold	Gold	—
(Slovenia) 2021 Pokljuka	23rd	Gold	Gold	Bronze	Gold	Gold	Silver

*During Olympic seasons competitions are only held for those events not included in the Olympic program.
**The single mixed relay was added as an event in 2019.

=== World Cup ===
Season	Age	Overall		Individual		Sprint		Pursuit		Mass start	
Season	Age	Points	Position	Points	Position	Points	Position	Points	Position	Points	Position
2011–12	21	74	54th	–	–	17	63rd	21	56th	36	34th
2012–13	22	299	29th	–	–	127	28th	98	28th	74	25th
2013–14	23	566	7th	56	10th	187	9th	236	5th	87	8th
2014–15	24	598	8th	41	24th	307	6th	123	20th	127	14th
2015–16	25	544	11th	63	14th	158	20th	189	10th	134	10th
2016–17	26	566	11th	2	72nd	277	6th	168	16th	119	12th
2017–18	27	297	23rd	19	39th	130	16th	90	29th	58	27th
2018–19	28	517	13th	64	14th	153	20th	176	10th	123	15th
2019–20	29	786	2nd	61	15th	283	3rd	232	1st	210	2nd
2020–21	30	1139	1st	41	27th	420	1st	360	1st	172	5th
2021–22	31	555	11th	41	13th	256	7th	158	13th	100	11th

=== World cup Individual Victories ===
- 29 victories – (14 Sp, 11 Pu, 3 MS, 1 In)

No.	Season	Date	Location	Race	Level
1	2014/15	6 December 2014	Östersund, Sweden	7.5 km Sprint	World Cup
2	2015/16	5 March 2016	Oslo Holmenkollen, Norway	7.5 km Sprint	World Championships
3	2016/17	10 March 2017	Kontiolahti, Finland	7.5 km Sprint	World Cup
4	2016/17	19 March 2017	Oslo Holmenkollen, Norway	12.5 km Mass Start	World Cup
5	2017/18	18 January 2018	Antholz, Italy	7.5 km Sprint	World Cup
6	2018/19	7 February 2019	Canmore, Canada	12.5 km Short Individual	World Cup
7	2019/20	15 December 2019	Hochfilzen, Austria	10 km Pursuit	World Cup
8	2019/20	20 December 2019	Le Grand-Bornand, France	7.5 km Sprint	World Cup
9	2019/20	21 December 2019	Le Grand-Bornand, France	10 km Pursuit	World Cup
10	2019/20	22 December 2019	Le Grand-Bornand, France	12.5 km Mass Start	World Cup
11	2019/20	15 January 2020	Ruhpolding, Germany	7.5 km Sprint	World Cup
12	2019/20	19 January 2020	Ruhpolding, Germany	10 km Pursuit	World Cup
13	2019/20	8 March 2020	Nové Město, Czech Republic	12.5 km Mass Start	World Cup
14	2020/21	6 December 2020	Kontiolahti, Finland	10 km Pursuit	World Cup
15	2020/21	18 December 2020	Hochfilzen, Austria	7.5 km Sprint	World Cup
16	2020/21	19 December 2020	Hochfilzen, Austria	10 km Pursuit	World Cup
17	2020/21	8 January 2021	Oberhof, Germany	7.5 km Sprint	World Cup
18	2020/21	9 January 2021	Oberhof, Germany	10 km Pursuit	World Cup
19	2020/21	14 January 2021	Oberhof, Germany	7.5 km Sprint	World Cup
20	2020/21	13 February 2021	Pokljuka, Slovenia	7.5 km Sprint	World Championships
21	2020/21	14 February 2021	Pokljuka, Slovenia	10 km Pursuit	World Championships
22	2020/21	6 March 2021	Nové Město, Czech Republic	7.5 km Sprint	World Cup
23	2020/21	7 March 2021	Nové Město, Czech Republic	10 km Pursuit	World Cup
24	2020/21	12 March 2021	Nové Město, Czech Republic	7.5 km Sprint	World Cup
25	2020/21	13 March 2021	Nové Město, Czech Republic	10 km Pursuit	World Cup
26	2020/21	19 March 2021	Östersund, Sweden	7.5 km Sprint	World Cup
27	2021/22	6 March 2022	Kontiolahti, Finland	10 km Pursuit	World Cup
28	2021/22	18 March 2022	Oslo Holmenkollen, Norway	7.5 km Sprint	World Cup
29	2021/22	19 March 2022	Oslo Holmenkollen, Norway	10 km Pursuit	World Cup
