= Marte Olsbu Røiseland =

Norwegian biathlete (born 1990)

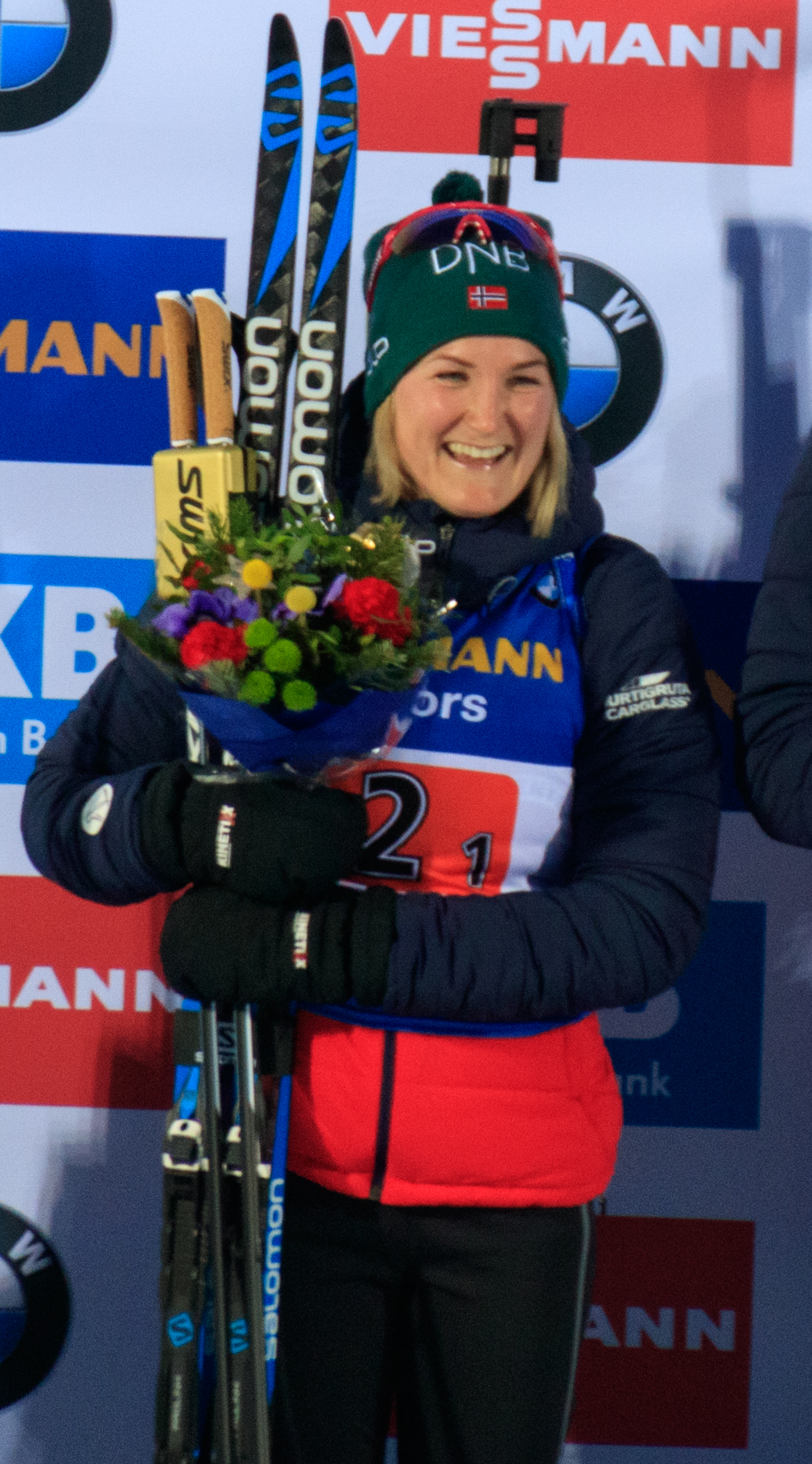
- Marte Olsbu Røiseland at the World Cup in Östersund 2019

Personal information
- Nationality: Norwegian
- Born: Marte Olsbu; 7 December 1990 (age 35) Arendal Municipality, Norway
- Height: 1.67 m (5 ft 6 in)
- Weight: 62 kg (137 lb)

Sport

Professional information
- Sport: Biathlon
- Club: Froland IL
- World Cup debut: 2012

Olympic Games
- Teams: 2 (2018, 2022)
- Medals: 7 (3 gold)

World Championships
- Teams: 7 (2015–2023)
- Medals: 17 (13 gold)

World Cup
- Seasons: 11 (2012/13–2022/23)
- All races: 261
- Individual victories: 17
- All victories: 38
- Individual podiums: 38
- All podiums: 70
- Overall titles: 1 (2021–22)
- Discipline titles: 2: 1 Sprint (2021–22); 1 Pursuit (2021–22)
Medal record
Women's biathlon
Representing Norway
Event	1st	2nd	3rd
Olympic Games	3	2	2
World Championships	13	0	4
Total	16	2	6
Olympic Games
Gold medal – first place	2022 Beijing	7.5 km sprint
Gold medal – first place	2022 Beijing	10 km pursuit
Gold medal – first place	2022 Beijing	Mixed relay
Silver medal – second place	2018 Pyeongchang	7.5 km sprint
Silver medal – second place	2018 Pyeongchang	Mixed relay
Bronze medal – third place	2022 Beijing	12.5 km mass start
Bronze medal – third place	2022 Beijing	15 km individual
World Championships
Gold medal – first place	2016 Oslo	4 × 6 km relay
Gold medal – first place	2019 Östersund	4 × 6 km relay
Gold medal – first place	2019 Östersund	Mixed relay
Gold medal – first place	2019 Östersund	Single mixed relay
Gold medal – first place	2020 Antholz	7.5 km sprint
Gold medal – first place	2020 Antholz	12.5 km mass start
Gold medal – first place	2020 Antholz	4 x 6 km relay
Gold medal – first place	2020 Antholz	Mixed relay
Gold medal – first place	2020 Antholz	Single mixed relay
Gold medal – first place	2021 Pokljuka	4 x 6 km relay
Gold medal – first place	2021 Pokljuka	Mixed relay
Gold medal – first place	2023 Oberhof	Mixed relay
Gold medal – first place	2023 Oberhof	Single mixed relay
Bronze medal – third place	2016 Oslo	Mixed relay
Bronze medal – third place	2020 Antholz	10 km pursuit
Bronze medal – third place	2020 Antholz	15 km individual
Bronze medal – third place	2023 Oberhof	10 km pursuit
European Championships
Gold medal – first place	2014 Nové Město	7.5 km sprint
Bronze medal – third place	2014 Nové Město	4 x 6 km relay
- Updated on 17 February 2023

Marte Olsbu Røiseland (born 7 December 1990) is a former Norwegian biathlete and 3 time Winter Olympic gold medalist. In addition, she won two Olympic silver medals and two bronze medals. Her world championships achievements include winning two gold medals and eleven relay victories. She won the overall Biathlon World Cup in 2022.

== Personal life ==
Olsbu Røiseland was born on 7 December 1990. She is married to Sverre Olsbu Røiseland. They have a son Tobias, born on 19 November 2023.

She resides in Froland Municipality, Norway.

== Career ==
Olsbu Røiseland has competed in the Biathlon World Cup since the 2012–13 World Cup season and has represented Norway at several Biathlon World Championships. During the Biathlon World Championships 2016 in Oslo, she won a bronze medal in the mixed relay and raced the final leg when Norway won the gold in the relay. At the Biathlon World Championships 2020 in Antholz, she became the first biathlete to win seven medals at a World Championship with her five gold medals and two bronze medals.

At the 2018 Winter Olympics in Pyeongchang, she won two silver medals in 7.5 kilometres sprint, and in the mixed relay. She placed fourth in 10 kilometres pursuit and eighth in the 12.5 kilometres mass start, and fourth in the women's relay with the Norwegian team.

At the 2022 Beijing Winter Olympics, she won three gold and two bronze medals, becoming the second biathlete to win a medal in all four individual events at a single Olympics, matching fellow Norwegian great Ole Einar Bjørndalen.

In the season 2021–22, she won the World Cup overall title. She also won the discipline title in sprint and pursuit.

In March 2023, Olsbu Røiseland announced her retirement from active biathlon career after the end of the season 2022–23.

== Awards ==
She won the award L'Équipe Champion of Champions in 2020. She is the first and only biathlete and the first and only Norwegian athlete to win this award.

She was awarded the Holmenkollen Medal in 2022. She also received the Fearnley award in 2022.

Biathlete of the Year 2022 by Forum Nordicum, the organization of journalists covering winter sports

== Biathlon results ==
All results are sourced from the International Biathlon Union.

=== Olympic Games ===
7 medals (3 gold, 2 silver, 2 bronze)

Year	Individual	Sprint	Pursuit	Mass start	Relay	Mixed relay
(South Korea) 2018 Pyeongchang	71st	Silver	4th	8th	4th	Silver
(China) 2022 Beijing	Bronze	Gold	Gold	Bronze	4th	Gold

=== World Championships ===
17 medals (13 gold, 4 bronze)

Year	Individual	Sprint	Pursuit	Mass start	Relay	Mixed relay	Single mixed relay
(Finland) 2015 Kontiolahti	–	31st	42nd	–	5th	–	—N/a
(Norway) 2016 Oslo	42nd	11th	16th	7th	Gold	Bronze	—N/a
(Austria) 2017 Hochfilzen	58th	54th	16th	29th	11th	8th	—N/a
(Sweden) 2019 Östersund	23rd	25th	4th	7th	Gold	Gold	Gold
(Italy) 2020 Antholz-Anterselva	Bronze	Gold	Bronze	Gold	Gold	Gold	Gold
(Slovenia) 2021 Pokljuka	20th	6th	9th	4th	Gold	Gold	−
(Germany) 2023 Oberhof	–	4th	Bronze	17th	6th	Gold	Gold

*During Olympic seasons competitions are only held for those events not included in the Olympic program.
**The single mixed relay was added as an event in 2019.

=== World Cup ===
Season	Age	Overall		Individual		Sprint		Pursuit		Mass start	
Season	Age	Points	Position	Points	Position	Points	Position	Points	Position	Points	Position
2012–13	22	13	81st	13	51st	0	–	0	–	0	—
2013–14	23	110	53rd	0	–	47	53rd	63	42nd	0	—
2014–15	24	143	44th	0	–	70	44th	73	29th	0	—
2015–16	25	352	22nd	8	56th	139	22nd	141	19th	64	25th
2016–17	26	551	12th	37	29th	172	14th	236	7th	106	16th
2017–18	27	450	14th	46	14th	115	21st	131	14th	158	8th
2018–19	28	855	4th	67	12th	326	3rd	312	2nd	161	4th
2019–20	29	597	5th	99	6th	248	4th	104	8th	146	8th
2020–21	30	963	2nd	28	31	319	2nd	319	2nd	175	4th
2021–22	31	957	1st	31	21	412	1st	380	1st	134	4th
2022–23	32	502	15th	34	24th	174	14th	169	11th	125	9th

=== Individual victories ===
19 victories (8 Sp, 9 Pu, 2 MS)

No.	Season	Date	Location	Discipline	Level
1	2018–19	21 December 2018	Nové Město, Czech Republic	7.5 km Sprint	World Cup
2	2018–19	22 December 2018	Nové Město, Czech Republic	10 km Pursuit	World Cup
3	2018–19	14 February 2019	Soldier Hollow, United States	7.5 km Sprint	World Cup
4	2019–20	9 January 2020	Oberhof, Germany	7.5 km Sprint	World Cup
5	2019–20	14 February 2020	Antholz-Anterselva, Italy	7.5 km Sprint	World Championships
6	2019–20	23 February 2020	Antholz-Anterselva, Italy	12.5 km Mass Start	World Championships
7	2020–21	13 December 2020	Hochfilzen, Austria	10 km Pursuit	World Cup
8	2020–21	21 December 2020	Hochfilzen, Austria	12.5 km Mass Start	World Cup
9	2020–21	20 March 2021	Östersund, Sweden	10 km Pursuit	World Cup
10	2021–22	4 December 2021	Östersund, Sweden	10 km Pursuit	World Cup
11	2021–22	12 December 2021	Hochfilzen, Austria	10 km Pursuit	World Cup
12	2021–22	16 December 2021	Le Grand-Bornand, France	7.5 km Sprint	World Cup
13	2021–22	7 January 2022	Oberhof, Germany	7.5 km Sprint	World Cup
14	2021–22	9 January 2022	Oberhof, Germany	10 km Pursuit	World Cup
15	2021–22	16 January 2022	Ruhpolding, Germany	10 km Pursuit	World Cup
16	2021–22	11 February 2022	Beijing, China	7.5 km Sprint	Winter Olympic Games
17	2021–22	13 February 2022	Beijing, China	10 km Pursuit	Winter Olympic Games
18	2022–23	3 March 2023	Nové Město, Czech Republic	7.5 km Sprint	World Cup
19	2022–23	4 March 2023	Nové Město, Czech Republic	10 km Pursuit	World Cup
