= Biathlon World Championships 2020 =

51st edition of the Biathlon World Championships

- Host city: Rasen-Antholz
- Country: Italy
- Events: 12
- Opening: 12 February
- Closing: 23 February
- Opened by: Sergio Mattarella
- Main venue: South Tyrol Arena
- Website: Website

The Biathlon World Championships 2020 took place in Rasen-Antholz, Italy, from 12 to 23 February 2020.

== Host selection ==
On 4 September 2016, Antholz-Anterselva won the voting (30 votes) during the twelfth IBU Congress in Chișinău over Pokljuka (15 votes) and Oberhof, Germany (four votes). Also, Nové Město na Moravě withdrew their bid for 2020 before the vote took place. The 2020 event is staged in Antholz for the sixth time.

== Schedule ==
All times are local (UTC+1).

Date	Time	Event
13 February	14:45	2 × 6 km W + 2 × 6 km M mixed relay
14 February	14:45	Women's 7.5 km sprint
15 February	14:45	Men's 10 km sprint
16 February	13:00	Women's 10 km pursuit
16 February	15:15	Men's 12.5 km pursuit
18 February	14:15	Women's 15 km individual
19 February	14:15	Men's 20 km individual
20 February	15:15	6 km W + 7.5 km M single mixed relay
22 February	11:45	Women's 4 × 6 km relay
22 February	14:45	Men's 4 × 7.5 km relay
23 February	12:30	Women's 12.5 km mass start
23 February	15:00	Men's 15 km mass start

== Medal summary ==
=== Medal table ===
* Host nation (Italy)

Rank	Nation	Gold	Silver	Bronze	Total
1	Norway	6	3	2	11
2	France	3	2	3	8
3	Italy*	2	2	0	4
4	Russia	1	0	1	2
5	Germany	0	4	1	5
6	United States	0	1	0	1
7	Czech Republic	0	0	2	2
8	Austria	0	0	1	1
8	Sweden	0	0	1	1
8	Ukraine	0	0	1	1
Totals (10 entries)		12	12	12	36

=== Top athletes ===
All athletes with two or more medals.

Rank	Nation	Gold	Silver	Bronze	Total
1	Marte Olsbu Røiseland (NOR)	5	0	2	7
2	Johannes Thingnes Bø (NOR)	3	3	0	6
3	Dorothea Wierer (ITA)	2	2	0	4
4	Émilien Jacquelin (FRA)	2	0	2	4
5	Martin Fourcade (FRA)	2	0	1	3
6	Tiril Eckhoff (NOR)	2	0	0	2
7	Quentin Fillon Maillet (FRA)	1	2	0	3
8	Tarjei Bø (NOR)	1	1	0	2
9	Alexander Loginov (RUS)	1	0	1	2
10	Denise Herrmann (GER)	0	2	0	2
10	Franziska Preuß (GER)	0	2	0	2
10	Vanessa Hinz (GER)	0	2	0	2
13	Erik Lesser (GER)	0	1	1	2

=== Men ===
Event	Gold		Silver		Bronze	
10 km sprint	Alexander Loginov; Russia	22:48.1 (0+0)	Quentin Fillon Maillet; France	22:54.6 (1+0)	Martin Fourcade; France	23:07.6 (0+0)
12.5 km pursuit	Émilien Jacquelin; France	31:15.2 (0+0+0+0)	Johannes Thingnes Bø; Norway	31:15.6 (1+1+0+0)	Alexander Loginov; Russia	31:29.1 (0+0+0+1)
20 km individual	Martin Fourcade; France	49:43.1 (0+0+0+1)	Johannes Thingnes Bø; Norway	50:40.1 (1+0+0+1)	Dominik Landertinger; Austria	51:05.2 (0+0+0+1)
4 × 7.5 km relay	France Émilien Jacquelin; Martin Fourcade; Simon Desthieux; Quentin Fillon Maillet	1:12:35.9 (0+0) (0+1) (0+0) (0+0) (0+0) (0+1) (0+0) (0+2)	Norway Vetle Sjåstad Christiansen; Johannes Dale; Tarjei Bø; Johannes Thingnes Bø	1:12:57.4 (0+0) (1+3) (0+0) (0+3) (0+1) (0+2) (0+2) (0+1)	Germany Erik Lesser; Philipp Horn; Arnd Peiffer; Benedikt Doll	1:13:12.1 (0+0) (0+0) (0+0) (0+1) (0+0) (0+1) (0+3) (1+3)
15 km mass start	Johannes Thingnes Bø; Norway	38:09.5 (0+0+0+0)	Quentin Fillon Maillet; France	38:51.5 (1+0+1+1)	Émilien Jacquelin; France	39:04.5 (1+0+1+0)

=== Women ===
Event	Gold		Silver		Bronze	
7.5 km sprint	Marte Olsbu Røiseland; Norway	21:13.1 (0+1)	Susan Dunklee; United States	21:19.9 (0+0)	Lucie Charvátová; Czech Republic	21:34.4 (1+0)
10 km pursuit	Dorothea Wierer; Italy	29:22.0 (0+0+0+1)	Denise Herrmann; Germany	29:31.5 (1+0+1+1)	Marte Olsbu Røiseland; Norway	29:37.8 (1+0+0+2)
15 km individual	Dorothea Wierer; Italy	43:07.7 (1+1+0+0)	Vanessa Hinz; Germany	43:09.9 (0+0+0+1)	Marte Olsbu Røiseland; Norway	43:23.5 (0+1+0+1)
4 × 6 km relay	Norway Synnøve Solemdal; Ingrid Landmark Tandrevold; Tiril Eckhoff; Marte Olsbu Røiseland	1:07:05.7 (0+1) (0+0) (0+0) (0+2) (0+3) (1+3) (0+0) (0+0)	Germany Karolin Horchler; Vanessa Hinz; Franziska Preuß; Denise Herrmann	1:07:16.4 (0+1) (0+3) (0+0) (0+0) (0+1) (0+0) (0+2) (0+2)	Ukraine Anastasiya Merkushyna; Yuliia Dzhima; Vita Semerenko; Olena Pidhrushna	1:07:24.1 (0+1) (0+1) (0+2) (0+0) (0+1) (0+2) (0+0) (0+1)
12.5 km mass start	Marte Olsbu Røiseland; Norway	39:14.0 (1+1+0+0)	Dorothea Wierer; Italy	39:34.7 (1+0+1+1)	Hanna Öberg; Sweden	39:40.1 (1+0+0+2)

=== Mixed ===
Event	Gold		Silver		Bronze	
4 × 6 km W+M relay	Norway Marte Olsbu Røiseland; Tiril Eckhoff; Tarjei Bø; Johannes Thingnes Bø	1:02:27.7 (0+0) (0+1) (0+2) (0+0) (0+0) (0+2) (0+0) (0+2)	Italy Lisa Vittozzi; Dorothea Wierer; Lukas Hofer; Dominik Windisch	1:02:43.3 (0+2) (0+0) (0+1) (0+1) (0+0) (0+0) (0+0) (0+2)	Czech Republic Eva Kristejn Puskarčíková; Markéta Davidová; Ondřej Moravec; Michal Krčmář	1:02:58.5 (0+1) (0+0) (0+0) (0+0) (0+0) (0+0) (0+0) (0+1)
6 km W + 7.5 km M single relay	Norway Marte Olsbu Røiseland; Johannes Thingnes Bø	34:19.9 (0+1) (0+0) (0+1) (0+3) (0+0) (0+1) (0+0) (0+0)	Germany Franziska Preuß; Erik Lesser	34:37.5 (0+0) (0+1) (0+0) (0+2) (0+1) (0+0) (0+0) (0+1)	France Anaïs Bescond; Émilien Jacquelin	34:49.7 (0+0) (0+0) (0+2) (0+1) (0+1) (0+0) (0+0) (0+0)
