= Biathlon World Championships 2021 – Women's sprint =

Women's sprint at the Biathlon World Championships 2021
- Location: Pokljuka, Slovenia
- Date: 13 February
- Competitors: 99 from 31 nations
- Winning time: 21:18.7

Medalists
gold medal	Tiril Eckhoff	Norway
silver medal	Anaïs Chevalier	France
bronze medal	Hanna Sola	Belarus

The Women's sprint competition at the Biathlon World Championships 2021 was held on 13 February 2021.

== Results ==
The race was started at 14:30.

Rank	Bib	Name	Nationality	Penalties (P+S)	Time	Deficit
1st place, gold medalist(s)	18	Tiril Eckhoff	Norway	0 (0+0)	21:18.7	
2nd place, silver medalist(s)	23	Anaïs Chevalier-Bouchet	France	1 (0+1)	21:30.7	+12.0
3rd place, bronze medalist(s)	24	Hanna Sola	Belarus	0 (0+0)	21:33.1	+14.4
4	7	Denise Herrmann	Germany	1 (0+1)	21:41.0	+22.3
5	35	Lisa Vittozzi	Italy	0 (0+0)	21:56.4	+37.7
6	11	Marte Olsbu Røiseland	Norway	2 (0+2)	22:02.2	+43.5
7	16	Lena Häcki	Switzerland	1 (1+0)	22:08.2	+49.5
8	15	Franziska Preuß	Germany	1 (0+1)	22:09.1	+50.4
9	25	Lisa Theresa Hauser	Austria	2 (1+1)	22:09.2	+50.5
10	31	Hanna Öberg	Sweden	1 (0+1)	22:17.5	+58.8
11	14	Olena Pidhrushna	Ukraine	1 (1+0)	22:24.1	+1:05.4
12	37	Vanessa Hinz	Germany	1 (0+1)	22:27.2	+1:08.5
13	59	Paulina Fialkova	Slovakia	1 (1+0)	22:29.4	+1:10.7
14	92	Darya Blashko	Ukraine	1 (1+0)	22:30.9	+1:12.2
15	48	Selina Gasparin	Switzerland	2 (0+2)	22:31.4	+1:12.7
16	20	Linn Persson	Sweden	2 (1+1)	22:32.7	+1:14.0
17	86	Ida Lien	Norway	2 (0+2)	22:35.9	+1:17.2
18	71	Susan Dunklee	United States	0 (0+0)	22:36.6	+1:17.9
19	95	Irina Kazakevich	RBU	1 (0+1)	22:38.3	+1:19.6
20	36	Dorothea Wierer	Italy	2 (1+1)	22:40.6	+1:21.9
21	9	Ingrid Landmark Tandrevold	Norway	2 (0+2)	22:42.0	+1:23.3
22	29	Elvira Öberg	Sweden	3 (2+1)	22:45.0	+1:26.3
23	94	Michela Carrara	Italy	1 (1+0)	22:47.3	+1:28.6
24	82	Irene Lardschneider	Italy	0 (0+0)	22:50.4	+1:31.7
25	13	Justine Braisaz-Bouchet	France	1 (0+1)	22:51.8	+1:33.1
26	4	Baiba Bendika	Latvia	3 (1+2)	22:57.0	+1:38.3
27	97	Elisa Gasparin	Switzerland	1 (0+1)	23:04.6	+1:45.9
28	27	Julia Simon	France	4 (2+2)	23:06.6	+1:47.9
29	41	Kamila Żuk	Poland	2 (0+2)	23:07.3	+1:48.6
30	22	Monika Hojnisz-Staręga	Poland	2 (1+1)	23:08.2	+1:49.5
31	33	Janina Hettich	Germany	2 (0+2)	23:10.9	+1:52.2
32	10	Johanna Talihärm	Estonia	3 (1+2)	23:11.0	+1:52.3
33	81	Aita Gasparin	Switzerland	2 (2+0)	23:11.3	+1:52.6
34	66	Anaïs Bescond	France	2 (2+0)	23:13.1	+1:54.4
35	56	Megan Bankes	Canada	2 (1+1)	23:13.6	+1:54.9
36	88	Uliana Kaisheva	RBU	2 (2+0)	23:15.0	+1:56.3
37	39	Yuliia Dzhima	Ukraine	3 (1+2)	23:17.1	+1:58.4
38	30	Dunja Zdouc	Austria	2 (0+2)	23:17.8	+1:59.1
39	74	Katharina Innerhofer	Austria	3 (1+2)	23:24.4	+2:05.7
40	3	Dzinara Alimbekava	Belarus	3 (1+2)	23:25.2	+2:06.5
41	52	Karoline Offigstad Knotten	Norway	1 (0+1)	23:27.2	+2:08.5
42	5	Emma Lunder	Canada	2 (2+0)	23:29.4	+2:10.7
43	67	Alla Ghilenko	Moldova	1 (0+1)	23:33.4	+2:14.7
44	1	Markéta Davidová	Czech Republic	4 (2+2)	23:33.7	+2:15.0
45	50	Tuuli Tomingas	Estonia	2 (1+1)	23:35.7	+2:17.0
46	19	Yelizaveta Belchenko	Kazakhstan	3 (2+1)	23:37.4	+2:18.7
47	63	Lotte Lie	Belgium	1 (0+1)	23:38.6	+2:19.9
48	6	Milena Todorova	Bulgaria	3 (0+3)	23:41.0	+2:22.3
49	46	Elena Kruchinkina	Belarus	3 (1+2)	23:41.7	+2:23.0
50	69	Valentina Semerenko	Ukraine	3 (1+2)	23:43.4	+2:24.7
51	28	Evgeniya Pavlova	RBU	2 (1+1)	23:45.7	+2:27.0
51	93	Deedra Irwin	United States	2 (1+1)	23:45.7	+2:27.0
53	34	Alina Stremous	Moldova	2 (0+2)	23:48.3	+2:29.6
54	21	Clare Egan	United States	4 (1+3)	23:49.7	+2:31.0
55	58	Joanne Reid	United States	3 (1+2)	23:49.8	+2:31.1
56	2	Mari Eder	Finland	3 (0+3)	23:51.7	+2:33.0
57	73	Elena Chirkova	Romania	1 (1+0)	23:53.1	+2:34.4
58	60	Mona Brorsson	Sweden	3 (0+3)	24:03.5	+2:44.8
59	26	Fuyuko Tachizaki	Japan	3 (2+1)	24:06.8	+2:48.1
60	72	Nadia Moser	Canada	3 (1+2)	24:07.1	+2:48.4
61	55	Gabrielė Leščinskaitė	Lithuania	2 (0+2)	24:11.0	+2:52.3
62	85	Erika Jänkä	Finland	0 (0+0)	24:12.8	+2:54.1
63	54	Julia Schwaiger	Austria	3 (3+0)	24:13.5	+2:54.8
64	43	Svetlana Mironova	RBU	6 (2+4)	24:24.2	+3:05.5
65	32	Ivona Fialková	Slovakia	4 (1+3)	24:25.0	+3:06.3
66	98	Joanna Jakieła	Poland	3 (2+1)	24:27.5	+3:08.8
67	12	Ekaterina Avvakumova	South Korea	3 (2+1)	24:27.7	+3:09.0
68	64	Eva Puskarčíková	Czech Republic	3 (0+3)	24:28.7	+3:10.0
69	79	Kinga Zbylut	Poland	3 (0+3)	24:29.5	+3:10.8
70	51	Sari Maeda	Japan	4 (2+2)	24:30.3	+3:11.6
71	17	Lucie Charvátová	Czech Republic	6 (3+3)	24:34.2	+3:15.5
71	83	Jessica Jislová	Czech Republic	4 (1+3)	24:34.2	+3:15.5
73	45	Galina Sheporenko	Kazakhstan	2 (1+1)	24:35.8	+3:17.1
74	47	Ana Cotrus	Romania	2 (1+1)	24:37.4	+3:18.7
75	77	Iryna Kryuko	Belarus	4 (2+2)	24:39.4	+3:20.7
76	38	Polona Klemenčič	Slovenia	3 (1+2)	24:53.6	+3:34.9
77	53	Ukaleq Slettemark	Greenland	2 (1+1)	24:53.7	+3:35.0
78	78	Yurie Tanaka	Japan	3 (1+2)	24:57.2	+3:38.5
79	49	Federica Sanfilippo	Italy	4 (1+3)	24:57.4	+3:38.7
80	91	Nastassia Kinnunen	Finland	4 (4+0)	25:03.8	+3:45.1
81	61	Amanda Lightfoot	Great Britain	4 (2+2)	25:13.0	+3:54.3
82	99	Sarah Beaudry	Canada	3 (0+3)	25:15.0	+3:56.3
83	8	Natalija Kočergina	Lithuania	5 (4+1)	25:23.4	+4:04.7
83	87	Regina Oja	Estonia	4 (2+2)	25:23.4	+4:04.7
85	62	Suvi Minkkinen	Finland	4 (3+1)	25:28.0	+4:09.3
86	70	Rieke Maeyer	Belgium	0 (0+0)	25:29.0	+4:10.3
87	90	Lea Einfalt	Slovenia	4 (2+2)	25:44.2	+4:25.5
88	57	Daniela Kadeva	Bulgaria	5 (3+2)	25:54.4	+4:35.7
89	96	Lena Repinc	Slovenia	5 (3+2)	25:56.2	+4:37.5
90	80	Nika Blaženić	Croatia	3 (2+1)	25:57.7	+4:39.0
91	89	Kim Seon-su	South Korea	4 (1+3)	26:04.6	+4:45.9
92	40	Sanita Buliņa	Latvia	6 (3+3)	26:08.3	+4:49.6
93	84	Veronika Machyniaková	Slovakia	3 (1+2)	26:11.9	+4:53.2
94	68	Anastassiya Kondratyeva	Kazakhstan	4 (1+3)	26:13.4	+4:54.7
95	44	Anika Kožica	Croatia	4 (1+3)	26:20.7	+5:02.0
96	65	Jillian Colebourn	Australia	3 (0+3)	26:36.8	+5:18.1
97	76	Maria Zdravkova	Bulgaria	3 (3+0)	26:44.0	+5:25.3
98	42	Anna Frolina	South Korea	9 (5+4)	26:55.8	+5:37.1
99	75	Annija Keita Sabule	Latvia	5 (2+3)	28:37.3	+7:18.6
