= Ukraine at the 2017 Winter Universiade =

- IOC code: UKR
- NOC: Sports Students Union of Ukraine
- Website: osvitasport.org

in Almaty, Kazakhstan 29 January 2017 – 8 February 2017
- Competitors: 64 in 10 sports
- Medals Ranked 10th: Gold 2 Silver 3 Bronze 4 Total 9

Winter Universiade appearances (overview)
- 1993; 1995; 1997; 1999; 2001; 2003; 2005; 2007; 2009; 2011; 2013; 2015; 2017; 2019; 2023; 2025

Ukraine competed at the 2017 Winter Universiade in Almaty, Kazakhstan. 64 Ukrainian athletes competed in 10 sports out of 12 except for curling and ice hockey.

== Medalists ==
Medal	Name	Sport	Event
Gold	Nadiia Bielkina	Biathlon	Women's 10 km pursuit
Gold	Oleksandra Nazarova; Maxim Nikitin	Figure skating	Ice dancing
Silver	Iana Bondar	Biathlon	Women's 7.5 km sprint
Silver	Iana Bondar	Biathlon	Women's 12.5 km mass start
Silver	Annamari Dancha	Snowboarding	Women's parallel giant slalom
Bronze	Nadiia Bielkina	Biathlon	Women's 15 km individual
Bronze	Nadiia Bielkina; Iana Bondar; Maksym Ivko; Artem Tyshchenko	Biathlon	Mixed 2 x 6 km + 2 x 7.5 km relay
Bronze	Oleksandr Belinskyy	Snowboarding	Men's parallel slalom
Bronze	Oleksandr Belinskyy	Snowboarding	Men's parallel giant slalom

== Competitors ==
The team included three Olympians (Annamari Dancha, Oleksiy Krasovsky, and Viktor Pasichnyk).

Sport	Men	Women	Total
Alpine skiing	5	1	6
Biathlon	8	8	16
Cross-country skiing	8	6	14
Figure skating	3	1	4
Freestyle skiing	4	1	5
Nordic combined	3	—N/a	3
Short track speed skating	1	3	4
Ski jumping	4	—	4
Snowboarding	4	2	6
Speed skating	—	2	2
Total	40	24	64

== Alpine skiing ==
Athlete	Event	Run 1		Run 2		Total	
Athlete	Event	Time	Rank	Time	Rank	Time	Rank
Ivan Kovbasnyuk	Men's combined	DNF		did not advance			
Ivan Kovbasnyuk	Men's super-G	—N/a				DNS	
Levko Tsibelenko	Men's combined	DNF		did not advance			
Levko Tsibelenko	Men's giant slalom	1:12.40	64	DNF			
Levko Tsibelenko	Men's slalom	DNF					
Levko Tsibelenko	Men's super-G	—N/a				DNF	
Andriy Mariichyn	Men's combined	1:13.29	47	1:03.56	29	2:16.85	31
Andriy Mariichyn	Men's giant slalom	1:15.86	70	1:16.33	56	2:32.19	58
Andriy Mariichyn	Men's slalom	1:05.31	43	DNF			
Andriy Mariichyn	Men's super-G	—N/a				1:13.10	55
Taras Kovbasnyuk	Men's combined	1:19.83	50	1:08.61	32	2:28.44	32
Taras Kovbasnyuk	Men's giant slalom	1:19.47	72	1:21.63	63	2:41.10	63
Taras Kovbasnyuk	Men's super-G	—N/a				1:20.62	58
Ihor Ham	Men's combined	DNF		did not advance			
Ihor Ham	Men's giant slalom	1:16.15	71	1:21.24	62	2:37.39	62
Ihor Ham	Men's super-G	—N/a				1:26.04	60
Mariia Ponomarenko	Women's combined	DNF					
Mariia Ponomarenko	Women's giant slalom	1:33.09	45	1:26.20	38	2:59.29	38
Mariia Ponomarenko	Women's slalom	56.99	44	57.59	37	1:54.58	37
Mariia Ponomarenko	Women's super-G	—N/a				DNF	
Andriy Mariichyn; Levko Tsibelenko; Mariia Ponomarenko	Team event	Lost to Russia (0—4)	—N/a				=9

== Biathlon ==
Men

Athlete	Event	Time	Misses	Rank
Anton Myhda	Individual	1:06:36.8	1 (0+1+0+0)	7
Dmytro Rusinov	Individual	1:07:47.5	3 (0+2+0+1)	14
Maksym Ivko	Individual	1:08:25.0	5 (2+1+2+0)	19
Oleksandr Moriev	Individual	1:08:36.4	3 (0+1+1+1)	21
Denys Nasyko	Individual	1:13:56.9	9 (2+2+3+2)	32
Dmytro Ihnatiev	Individual	1:14:22.5	5 (0+1+1+3)	35
Artem Tyshchenko	Sprint	28:02.6	0 (0+0)	11
Denys Nasyko	Sprint	28:19.3	2 (0+2)	13
Maksym Ivko	Sprint	28:25.1	1 (0+1)	14
Anton Myhda	Sprint	28:34.9	1 (1+0)	17
Dmytro Rusinov	Sprint	28:40.1	1 (0+1)	19
Oleksandr Moriev	Sprint	29:38.3	2 (0+2)	28
Maksym Ivko	Pursuit	+2:17.0	1 (1+0+0+0)	11
Artem Tyshchenko	Pursuit	+2:44.7	4 (2+1+1+0)	12
Denys Nasyko	Pursuit	+2:50.1	5 (1+0+2+2)	13
Anton Myhda	Pursuit	+3:21.4	4 (2+0+1+1)	19
Dmytro Rusinov	Pursuit	+3:28.4	3 (0+3+0+0)	20
Oleksandr Moriev	Pursuit	+4:49.1	3 (0+1+1+1)	27
Artem Tyshchenko	Mass start	+1:51.7	3 (0+0+1+2)	8
Anton Myhda	Mass start	+2:01.5	2 (0+0+0+2)	9
Maksym Ivko	Mass start	+2:11.6	3 (0+1+1+1)	11
Dmytro Rusinov	Mass start	+3:08.2	3 (1+0+1+1)	14
Oleksandr Moriev	Mass start	+3:46.9	2 (1+0+0+1)	18
Denys Nasyko	Mass start	+5:13.9	6 (1+2+2+1)	21

Women

Athlete	Event	Time	Misses	Rank
Nadiia Bielkina	Individual	1:02:12.3	5 (1+2+0+1)	3rd place, bronze medalist(s)
Yuliya Zhuravok	Individual	1:04:03.0	5 (0+0+3+2)	6
Iana Bondar	Individual	1:04:24.8	7 (1+2+0+4)	19
Mariya Kruchova	Individual	1:06:48.9	6 (2+2+2+0)	12
Yuliya Bryhynets	Individual	1:08:43.5	6 (0+1+2+3)	16
Yana Pustovalova	Individual	1:09:41.3	3 (1+1+1+0)	18
Iana Bondar	Sprint	22:05.9	2 (1+1)	2nd place, silver medalist(s)
Yuliya Zhuravok	Sprint	22:33.5	1 (0+1)	4
Nadiia Bielkina	Sprint	22:47.5	2 (1+1)	6
Yuliya Bryhynets	Sprint	22:59.0	0 (0+0)	9
Mariya Kruchova	Sprint	24:25.6	3 (1+2)	17
Yana Pustovalova	Sprint	24:35.0	1 (1+1)	19
Nadiia Bielkina	Pursuit	32:39.6	3 (0+0+2+1)	1st place, gold medalist(s)
Iana Bondar	Pursuit	+48.2	7 (2+0+1+4)	4
Yuliya Bryhynets	Pursuit	+2:31.4	3 (2+1+0+0)	11
Mariya Kruchova	Pursuit	+3:21.5	4 (2+0+1+1)	14
Yana Pustovalova	Pursuit	+4:59.5	4 (0+1+2+1)	16
Yuliya Zhuravok	Pursuit	Did not start		
Iana Bondar	Mass start	+1:02.3	5 (0+0+3+2)	2nd place, silver medalist(s)
Nadiia Bielkina	Mass start	+2:23.9	5 (2+0+3+0)	6
Mariya Kruchova	Mass start	+2:57.0	3 (1+0+2+0)	9
Yuliya Bryhynets	Mass start	+3:33.2	2 (0+0+1+1)	10
Yana Pustovalova	Mass start	Did not finish	2 (0+2+0+)	No rank

Mixed

Athlete	Event	Time	Misses	Rank
Nadiia Bielkina; Iana Bondar; Maksym Ivko; Artem Tyshchenko	Relay	1:17:10.4	1+11	3rd place, bronze medalist(s)

== Cross-country skiing ==
Ukraine was represented by 14 athletes.

Distance
Men

Athlete	Event	Final result		
Athlete	Event	Time	Deficit	Rank
Oleksiy Krasovsky	10 km classical	1:22:28.4	+2:50.9	6
Oleksiy Krasovsky	10 km pursuit	29:51.4	+3:38.9	23
Oleksiy Krasovsky	30 km mass start	1:13:24.4	+35.6	11
Kostyantyn Yaremenko	10 km classical	27:20.7	+2:08.7	26
Kostyantyn Yaremenko	10 km pursuit	30:24.1	+4:11.6	27
Kostyantyn Yaremenko	30 km mass start	1:25:22.6	+5:45.1	21
Andriy Marchenko	10 km classical	27:45.5	+2:33.5	37
Andriy Marchenko	10 km pursuit	31:01.0	+4:48.5	31
Andriy Marchenko	10 km pursuit	1:25:01.9	+5:24.4	19
Vladyslav Kopylov	10 km classical	28:21.3	+3:09.3	47
Vladyslav Kopylov	10 km pursuit	31:38.5	+5:26.0	39
Oleksandr Chelenko	10 km classical	28:23.6	+3:11.6	48
Oleksandr Chelenko	10 km pursuit	31:38.9	+5:26.4	42
Oleksandr Chelenko	30 km mass start	1:25:39.5	+6:02.0	23
Vladyslav Litvin	10 km classical	28:33.2	+3:21.2	53
Vladyslav Litvin	10 km pursuit	33:05.9	+6:53.4	57
Vladyslav Litvin	30 km mass start	1:29:43.1	+10:05.6	33
Volodymyr Lazorak	30 km mass start	1:28:45.4	+9:07.9	30
Oleksiy Krasovsky; Kostyantyn Yaremenko; Andriy Marchenko; Oleksandr Chelenko	4×7.5 km relay	1:16:11.9	+3:22.6	6

Women

Athlete	Event	Final result		
Athlete	Event	Time	Deficit	Rank
Yulia Tarasenko	5 km classical	16:22.4	+2:13.8	27
Yulia Tarasenko	5 km pursuit	17:26.6	+3:56.9	26
Yulia Tarasenko	15 km mass start	48:19.9	+4:10.2	15
Iryna Solovei	5 km classical	16:41.9	+2:33.3	30
Iryna Solovei	5 km pursuit	18:56.0	+5:26.3	40
Iryna Solovei	15 km mass start	49:28.5	+5:18.8	19
Mariya Nasyko	5 km classical	16:51.9	+2:43.3	34
Mariya Nasyko	5 km pursuit	17:36.4	+4:06.7	29
Mariya Nasyko	15 km mass start	53:32.6	+9:22.9	32
Oksana Siheti	5 km classical	16:54.0	+2:45.4	35
Oksana Siheti	5 km pursuit	18:12.6	+4:42.9	33
Oksana Siheti	15 km mass start	49:14.0	+5:04.3	18
Viktoriya Olekh	5 km classical	16:59.2	+2:50.6	38
Viktoriya Olekh	5 km pursuit	17:33.2	+4:03.5	28
Daryna Mazur	5 km classical	19:17.6	+5:09.0	58
Daryna Mazur	5 km pursuit	21:56.0	+8:26.3	54
Daryna Mazur	15 km mass start	59:56.7	+15:47.0	37
Yulia Tarasenko; Viktoriya Olekh; Mariya Nasyko	3×5 km relay	48:07.8	+5:42.7	5

Sprint

Athlete	Event	Qualification		Quarterfinal		Semifinal		Final	
Athlete	Event	Time	Rank	Time	Rank	Time	Rank	Time	Rank
Oleksiy Krasovsky	Men's sprint	3:58.08	13 Q	+0.81	PF3	Did not advance			
Volodymyr Lazorak	Men's sprint	4:06.34	32	Did not advance					
Kostyantyn Yaremenko	Men's sprint	4:14.00	40	Did not advance					
Andriy Marchenko	Men's sprint	4:16.14	46	Did not advance					
Oleksandr Chelenko	Men's sprint	4:17.70	53	Did not advance					
Dmytro Drahun	Men's sprint	4:29.23	66	Did not advance					
Viktoriya Olekh	Women's sprint	3:44.97	18 Q	+10.13	5	Did not advance			
Mariya Nasyko	Women's sprint	3:57.97	31	Did not advance					
Yulia Tarasenko	Women's sprint	3:58.39	32	Did not advance					
Oksana Siheti	Women's sprint	4:04.95	40	Did not advance					
Iryna Solovei	Women's sprint	4:21.60	48	Did not advance					
Daryna Mazur	Women's sprint	4:41.84	52	Did not advance					

Relay

Athlete	Event	Semifinal		Final	
Athlete	Event	Time	Rank	Time	Rank
Mariya Nasyko; Volodymyr Lazorak	Mixed team sprint	+1:20.65	8	Did not advance	
Viktoriya Olekh; Vladyslav Kopylov	Mixed team sprint	+50.61	5 LL	Did not start	

== Figure skating ==
Athlete	Event	SP		FS		Total	
Athlete	Event	Points	Rank	Points	Rank	Points	Rank
Ivan Pavlov	Men's singles	67.27	12 Q	133.17	14	200.44	15
Vladyslav Pikhovych	Men's singles	40.02	34	did not advance			
Oleksandra Nazarova; Maksym Nikitin	Ice dance	64.12	1 Q	101.50	1	165.62	1st place, gold medalist(s)

== Freestyle skiing ==
Five skiers represented Ukraine in freestyle skiing.

Moguls

Athlete	Event	Qualification		Final	
Athlete	Event	Points	Rank	Points	Rank
Andriy Lebedyk	Men's moguls	29.25	11 Q	34.47	10
Oleh Masyra	Men's moguls	33.41	10 Q	34.26	11
Tetiana Petrova	Women's moguls	47.45	4 Q	45.17	5

Dual moguls

Athlete	Event	Qualification		Quarterfinal	Semifinal	Final	Rank
Athlete	Event	Points	Rank	Quarterfinal	Semifinal	Final	Rank
Oleh Masyra	Men's dual moguls	34.49	11	Did not advance			11
Andriy Lebedyk	Men's dual moguls	5.34	13	Did not advance			13
Tetiana Petrova	Women's dual moguls	48.01	5 Q	(Austria) Ramsauer; L	Did not advance		5

Ski cross

Athlete	Event	Seeding		Round of 16	Quarterfinal	Semifinal	Final	Rank
Athlete	Event	Time	Rank	Position	Position	Position	Position	Rank
Taras Kovbasnyuk	Men's ski cross	1:01.84	27 Q	4th	Did not advance			27
Ihor Ham	Men's ski cross	1:01.95	28 Q	4th	Did not advance			28

== Nordic combined ==
Men

Athlete	Event	Ski jumping			Cross-country		Total	
Athlete	Event	Distance	Points	Rank	Time	Rank	Time behind/Points	Rank
Viktor Pasichnyk	Individual normal hill/10 km	91.0	101.2	10	23:22.1	2	+45.6	7
Ruslan Balanda	Individual normal hill/10 km	81.0	80.8	19	24:04.3	7	+2:48.8	14
Valerii Morozov	Individual normal hill/10 km	63.5	38.6	25	27:22.4	21	+8:55.9	22
Viktor Pasichnyk	Individual mass start 10 km/normal hill	88.5 / 90.0	97.0	11 / 10	22:57.1 (119.5)	3	216.5	7
Ruslan Balanda	Individual mass start 10 km/normal hill	83.0 / 82.0	64.1	15 / 19	23:49.0 (106.5)	8	170.6	16
Valerii Morozov	Individual mass start 10 km/normal hill	60.0 / 62.0	-22.0	24 / 24	26:46.0 (62.2)	19	40.2	23
Ruslan Balanda; Valerii Morozov; Viktor Pasichnyk	Team normal hill/3 x 5 km	242.8		6	36:26.2	5	+4:30.3	5

== Short track speed skating ==
Ukraine was represented by 4 athletes.

Men

Athlete	Event	Heat		Quarterfinal		Semifinal		Final	
Athlete	Event	Time	Rank	Time	Rank	Time	Rank	Time	Rank
Nikita Nemiro	500 m	44.712	3	Did not advance					
Nikita Nemiro	1000 m	1:31.953	3	Did not advance					
Nikita Nemiro	1500 m	—N/a		24.974	4	Did not advance			

Women

Athlete	Event	Heat		Quarterfinal		Semifinal		Final	
Athlete	Event	Time	Rank	Time	Rank	Time	Rank	Time	Rank
Mariya Dolgopolova	500 m	46.623	3	Did not advance					
Mariya Dolgopolova	1000 m	1:38.261	4	Did not advance					
Mariya Dolgopolova	1500 m	—N/a		2:43.910	6	Did not advance			
Mariia Uzakova	500 m	45.945	4	Did not advance					
Mariia Uzakova	1000 m	1:38.657	3	Did not advance					
Mariia Uzakova	1500 m	—N/a		2:43.471	4	Did not advance			
Yuliia Kromido	500 m	49.248	4	Did not advance					
Yuliia Kromido	1000 m	1:41.898	3	Did not advance					
Yuliia Kromido	1500 m	—N/a		2:30.327	4	Did not advance			

== Ski jumping ==
Ukraine was represented in men's competitions only.

Men

Athlete	Event	Jump 1		Jump 2		Total	
Athlete	Event	Distance	Points	Distance	Points	Points	Rank
Andrii Klymchuk	Men's normal hill	88.0 m	101.3	DNQ		101.3	38
Igor Yakibyuk	Men's normal hill	79.0 m	80.3	DNQ		80.3	48
Vitalii Dodyuk	Men's normal hill	75.0 m	67.5	DNQ		67.5	50
Ivan Zelenchuk	Men's normal hill	DSQ					
Ivan Zelenchuk; Igor Yakibyuk; Andrii Klymchuk	Men's team normal hill	236.6		DNQ		236.6	9

== Snowboarding ==
Snowboard cross

Athlete	Event	Qualification						1/8 Finals	Quarterfinals	Semifinals	Final	
Athlete	Event	Run 1		Run 2		Best		Position	Position	Position	Position	Rank
Athlete	Event	Time	Rank	Time	Rank	Time	Rank	Position	Position	Position	Position	Rank
Roman Aleksandrovskyy	Men's	1:08.18	15	1:07.69	13	1:07.69	15 Q	2 Q	3	Did not advance		
Taras Bihus	Men's	1:08.17	14	1:08.25	16	1:08.17	17 Q	4	Did not advance			

Parallel

Athlete	Event	Qualification		Round of 16	Quarterfinal	Semifinal	Final	
Athlete	Event	Time	Rank	Opposition Time	Opposition Time	Opposition Time	Opposition Time	Rank
Oleksandr Belinskyy	Men's parallel giant slalom	50.98	4 Q	(China) Qiao; W	(South Korea) Lee; W	(Russia) Bogdanov; L +3.27	(Poland) Nowaczyk; W	3rd place, bronze medalist(s)
Oleksandr Belinskyy	Men's parallel slalom	1:04.28	4 Q	(Ukraine) Huliy; W	(Russia) Shkurikhin; W	(Russia) Bogdanov; L DSQ	(Russia) Khuramshin; W	3rd place, bronze medalist(s)
Yevheniy Huliy	Men's parallel giant slalom	54.98	14 Q	(Russia) Taimulin; L +3.67	Did not advance			
Yevheniy Huliy	Men's parallel slalom	1:09.31	13 Q	(Ukraine) Belinskyy; L +1.07	Did not advance			
Roman Aleksandrovskyy	Men's parallel giant slalom	51.95	6 Q	(Poland) Nowaczyk; L +5.16	Did not advance			
Taras Bihus	Men's parallel giant slalom	1:01.60	20	Did not advance				
Annamari Dancha	Women's parallel giant slalom	54.25	2 Q	(Turkey) Geneşke; W	(Russia) Groznova; W	(Poland) Biela; W	(Poland) Król; L +0.08	2nd place, silver medalist(s)
Annamari Dancha	Women's parallel slalom	1:07.35	2 Q	(Canada) van Groningen; W	(Canada) Hawkrigg; L DSQ	Did not advance		6
Tetiana Kopchak	Women's parallel giant slalom	1:09.36	24	Did not advance				
Tetiana Kopchak	Women's parallel slalom	1:23.57	23	Did not advance				

== Speed skating ==
Women

Athlete	Event	Time	Rank
Anna Muzyka	500 m	92.20	33
Anna Muzyka	1000 m	1:32.99	32
Anna Muzyka	1500 m	2:25.62	39
Anna Muzyka	3000 m	4:51.90	25
Anna Muzyka	5000 m	8:13.29	11
Yelyzaveta Bilozerska	500 m	93.20	35
Yelyzaveta Bilozerska	1000 m	1:37.60	33
Yelyzaveta Bilozerska	1500 m	2:29.77	40
Yelyzaveta Bilozerska	3000 m	5:11.74	31

Mass start

Athlete	Event	Finals		
Athlete	Event	Points	Time	Rank
Anna Muzyka	Women's	8	10:56.39	4

== See also ==
- Ukraine at the 2017 Summer Universiade
