= Biathlon European Championships 2015 =

Biathlon competition in Otepää, Estonia

The 22nd Biathlon European Championships were held in Otepää, Estonia from January 28 to February 3, 2015.

There were total of 15 competitions held: sprint, pursuit and individual both for Open and Junior, relay races for Open and a mixed relay for junior.

== Schedule of events ==
The schedule of the event stands below. All times in CET.

Date	Time	Event
January 28	10:00	Junior Women's individual
January 28	13:30	Junior Men's individual
January 29	10:00	Women's individual
January 29	13:30	Men's individual
January 30	10:00	Junior Women's sprint
January 30	13:00	Junior Men's sprint
January 31	10:00	Women's sprint
January 31	13:00	Men's sprint
February 1	09:30	Junior Women's pursuit
February 1	10:45	Women's pursuit
February 1	13:00	Men's pursuit
February 1	14:15	Junior Men's pursuit
February 2	11:00	Junior Mixed relay
February 3	09:00	Women's relay
February 3	12:00	Men's relay

== Results ==
=== Men's ===
Event	Gold		Silver		Bronze	
Men's 20 km Individual details	Alexey Volkov; Russia	53.23.2 (0+0+0+2)	Serhiy Semenov; Ukraine	54.28.8 (1+2+1+0)	Vladimir Iliev; Bulgaria	54.54.4 (0+0+2+2)
Men's 10 km Sprint details	Alexey Slepov; Russia	22.38.0 (0+0)	Lars Helge Birkeland; Norway	22.52.5 (0+1)	Antonin Guigonnat; France	23.15.8 (1+0)
Men's 12.5 km Pursuit details	Alexey Slepov; Russia	33.21.0 (1+0+1+1)	Krasimir Anev; Bulgaria	34.05.3 (1+1+0+1)	Anton Babikov; Russia	34.11.7 (0+0+2+2)
Men's 4 x 7.5 km relay details	Ukraine; Artem Tyshchenko; Serhiy Semenov; Artem Pryma; Dmytro Pidruchnyi	1:11:05.1 (0+1) (0+1) (0+0) (0+0) (0+0) (0+1) (0+1) (0+0)	Norway; Håvard Bogetveit; Andreas Dahlø Wærnes; Vegard Bjørn Gjermundshaug; Lars Helge Birkeland	1:12:02.0 (0+1) (0+1) (0+0) (0+2) (0+1) (0+0) (0+0) (0+1)	Belarus; Vladimir Chepelin; Dmitriy Dyuzhev; Dzmitry Abasheu; Yuryi Liadov	1:12:05.2 (0+2) (0+2) (0+0) (0+0) (0+2) (0+1) (0+2) (0+2)

- Russian team (Alexey Volkov, Anton Babikov, Aleksandr Pechenkin, Alexey Slepov) which finished first (1:10:50.9), later was disqualified because of an anti-doping rule violation by Aleksandr Pechenkin. The medals were reallocated accordingly.

=== Women's ===
Event	Gold		Silver		Bronze	
Women's 15 km individual details	Luminița Pișcoran; Romania	51.15.7 (1+3+1+0)	Christina Rieder; Austria	51:36.3 (1+0+1+1)	Ekaterina Yurlova; Russia	52:03.2 (0+4+1+2)
Women's 7.5 km sprint details	Coline Varcin; France	20:26.4 (0+0)	Weronika Nowakowska-Ziemniak; Poland	20:36.1 (0+1)	Ekaterina Shumilova; Russia	20:36.5 (1+0)
Women's 10 km pursuit details	Ekaterina Shumilova; Russia	33.07.4 (0+0+2+0)	Iryna Varvynets; Ukraine	33:39.3 (0+0+2+0)	Ekaterina Yurlova; Russia	34:01.5 (0+1+1+1)
Women's 4 x 6 km relay details	Ukraine; Juliya Dzhyma; Natalya Burdyga; Valentina Semerenko; Iryna Varvynets	1:09:58.5 (0+0) (0+1) (0+0) (1+3) (0+3) (0+2) (0+0) (0+0)	Germany; Annika Knoll; Tina Bachmann; Maren Hammerschmidt; Karolin Horchler	1:10:17.1 (0+0) (0+0) (0+2) (0+0) (0+3) (0+0) (0+0) (0+1)	France; Anaïs Chevalier; Chloé Chevalier; Julia Simon; Coline Varcin	1:10:19.9 (0+1) (0+0) (0+1) (0+3) (0+0) (0+1) (0+1) (0+1)

=== Junior ===
==== Men's ====
Event	Gold	Silver	Bronze
Men's 10 km sprint	(France) Fabien Claude	(Russia) Eduard Latypov	(Russia) Aleksandr Dediukhin
Men's 12.5 km pursuit	(Russia) Eduard Latypov	(Estonia) Rene Zahkna	(Russia) Alexander Povarnitsyn
Men's 20 km individual	(France) Aristide Bègue	(Estonia) Rene Zahkna	(Ukraine) Maksym Ivko

==== Women's ====
Event	Gold	Silver	Bronze
Women's 7.5 km sprint	(Ukraine) Anastasiya Merkushyna	(Austria) Dunja Zdouc	(Russia) Uliana Kaisheva
Women's 10 km pursuit	(Ukraine) Anastasiya Merkushyna	(Russia) Uliana Kaisheva	(Austria) Dunja Zdouc
Women's 15 km individual	(Russia) Victoria Slivko	(Austria) Dunja Zdouc	(Ukraine) Yuliya Zhuravok

==== Mixed ====
Event	Gold	Silver	Bronze
2 x 6 + 2 x 7.5 km relay	(Russia) Russia; Uliana Kaisheva; Victoria Slivko; Dmitrii Shamaev; Alexander Povarnitsyn	(France) France; Emily Battendier; Lena Arnaud; Aristide Bègue; Fabien Claude	(Ukraine) Ukraine; Anastasiya Merkushyna; Yuliya Zhuravok; Maksym Ivko; Anton Myhda
