= Rene Zahkna =

Estonian biathlete (born 1994)

- Rene Zahkna in 2026

Personal information
- Full name: Rene Zahkna
- Born: 2 October 1994 (age 32) Võru, Estonia
- Height: 1.84 m (6 ft 0 in)

Sport

Professional information
- Sport: Biathlon
- Club: Võru SpK
- Skis: Fischer
- World Cup debut: 13 March 2014

World Cup
- Seasons: (2013/14–)
- Individual races: 63
- All races: 96
- Individual podiums: 0
- All podiums: 1
Medal record
Men's biathlon
Representing Estonia
Winter Youth Olympics
Silver medal – second place	2012 Innsbruck	7.5 km sprint
Silver medal – second place	2012 Innsbruck	10 km pursuit
Youth World Championships
Silver medal – second place	2013 Obertilliach	10 km pursuit
Bronze medal – third place	2013 Obertilliach	7.5 km sprint
Biathlon European Championships
Gold medal – first place	2014 Nove Mesto	15 km individual(U21)
Silver medal – second place	2015 Otepää	15 km individual(U21)
Silver medal – second place	2015 Otepää	12.5 km pursuit(U21)
Bronze medal – third place	2014 Nove Mesto	Mixed relay(U21)

Rene Zahkna (born 2 October 1994) is an Estonian biathlete. Zahkna won two medals at the 2015 European Championships and two medals at the 2014 European Championships, two medals at the 2013 Junior World Championships and two medals at the 2012 Winter Youth Olympics. He debuted in the Biathlon World Cup on 13 March 2014 in Kontiolahti, Finland, finishing 68th. He earned his first World cup points on 13 January 2016 in Ruhpolding, Germany, with a 34th position finish.

He represented Estonia at the 2018 Winter Olympics.

== Biathlon results ==
All results are sourced from the International Biathlon Union.

=== Olympic Games ===
Event	Individual	Sprint	Pursuit	Mass start	Relay	Mixed relay
(South Korea) 2018 Pyeongchang	65th	75th	—	—	13th	—
(China) 2022 Beijing	68th	50th	50th	—	15th	16th
(Italy) 2026 Milano Cortina	42nd	44th	51st	—	13th	15th

=== World Championships ===
Event	Individual	Sprint	Pursuit	Mass Start	Relay	Mixed Relay	Single Mixed Relay
(Finland) 2015 Kontiolahti	—	—	—	—	15th	—	—N/a
(Norway) 2016 Oslo	81st	—	—	—	14th	21st	—N/a
(Austria) 2017 Hochfilzen	45th	—	—	—	21st	21st	—N/a
(Sweden) 2019 Östersund	—	68th	—	—	14th	14th	11th
(Italy) 2020 Antholz-Anterselva	35th	59th	49th	—	21st	15th	12th
(Slovenia) 2021 Pokljuka	32nd	42nd	39th	—	21st	19th	10th
(Germany) 2023 Oberhof	90th	58th	DNS	—	15th	15th	9th
(Czech Republic) 2024 Nove Mesto	40th	36th	40th	—	17th	12th	11th
(Switzerland) 2025 Lenzerheide	46th	69th	—	—	11th	13th	15th

=== World Cup ===
Season	Overall		Individual		Sprint		Pursuit		Mass start	
Season	Points	Position	Points	Position	Points	Position	Points	Position	Points	Position
2015-16	8	97th	7	58th	—	—	1	79th	—	—
2016-17	Didn't earn World Cup point									
2017-18	7	90th	—	—	7	80th	—	—	—	—
2018-19	17	84th	—	—	3	85th	14	63rd	—	—
2019-20	6	89th	6	59th	—	—	—	—	—	—
2020-21	12	85th	11	52nd	—	—	1	78th	—	—

==== Team podiums ====
- 1 podiums

No.	Season	Date	Location	Race	Place	Team
1	2019–20	25 January 2020	(Slovenia) Pokljuka	Single Mixed Relay	2nd	Zahkna / Oja

=== Winter Youth Olympics ===
Event	Sprint	Pursuit	Relay	Mixed Relay
(Austria) 2012 Innsbruck	Silver	Silver	8th	8th

=== Junior/Youth World Championships ===
Event	Individual	Sprint	Pursuit	Relay
(Finland) 2012 Kontiolahti	65th	23rd	18th	18th
(Austria) 2013 Obertilliach	5th	Bronze	Silver	10th
(United States) 2014 Presque Isle	24th	24th	15th	-
(Belarus) 2015 Minsk	19th	14th	21st	11th

=== European Championships ===
Event	Individual	Sprint	Pursuit	Mixed Relay
(Bulgaria) 2013 Bansko	28th	21st	14th	-
(Czech Republic) 2014 Nove Mesto	Gold	17th	14th	Bronze
(Estonia) 2015 Otepää	Silver	5th	Silver	5th

== Personal ==
His father is a former biathlete Hillar Zahkna.

== See also ==
- List of professional sports families
