= Ski jumping at the 2017 Winter Universiade – Men's individual normal hill =

The men's individual normal hill competition of the 2017 Winter Universiade will be held at the Sunkar International Ski Jumping Complex in Almaty on February 1.

== Results ==
Rank	Bib	Name	Country	Round 1 Distance (m)	Round 1 Points	Round 1 Rank	Final Round Distance (m)	Final Round Points	Final Round Rank	Total Points
	1	Aljaz Zepic	Slovenia							
	2	Ivan Lanin	Russia							
	3	Krzysztof Leja	Poland							
	4	Lucas Schaffer	Austria							
	5	Lee Ju-chan	South Korea							
	6	Muhammed Munir Gungen	Turkey							
	7	Tomoya Watanabe	Japan							
	8	Przemysław Kantyka	Poland							
	9	Max Koga	Japan							
	10	Fabian Steindl	Austria							
	11	Andraz Modic	Slovenia							
	12	Akram Adilov	Kazakhstan							
	13	Ayberk Demir	Turkey							
	14	Aljaz Vodan	Slovenia							
	15	Krzysztof Miętus	Poland							
	16	Martin Capuder	Slovenia							
	17	Roman Nogin	Kazakhstan							
	18	Petrick Hammann	Germany							
	19	Vadim Shishkin	Russia							
	20	Rikuta Watanabe	Japan							
	21	Muhammet Irfan Cintimar	Turkey							
	22	Artur Kukuła	Poland							
	23	Sergey Akhabadze	Georgia							
	24	Ivan Zelenchuk	Ukraine							
	25	Si Jeong-heon	South Korea							
	26	Egor Usachev	Russia							
	27	Jan Michalek	Czech Republic							
	28	Anze Lavtizar	Slovenia							
	29	Matija Stemberger	Slovenia							
	30	Mikhail Nazarov	Russia							
	31	Rauno Loit	Estonia							
	32	Sergey Tkachenko	Kazakhstan							
	33	Thomas Roch Dupland	France							
	34	Aleksandr Bazhenov	Russia							
	35	Elias Vaenskae	Finland							
	36	Naoki Nakamura	Japan							
	37	Filip Sakala	Czech Republic							
	38	Wang Bingrong	China							
	39	Igor Yakibyuk	Ukraine							
	40	Vitalii Dodyuk	Ukraine							
	41	Raiko Heide	Estonia							
	42	Jan Soucek	Czech Republic							
	43	Andrii Klymchuk	Ukraine							
	44	Riku Taehkaevuori	Finland							
	45	Roman Sergeevich Trofimov	Russia							
	46	Frans Taehkaevuori	Finland							
	47	Ossi-Pekka Valta	Finland							
	48	Tobias Simon	Germany							
	49	Jan Maylaender	Germany							
	50	Sabirzhan Muminov	Kazakhstan							
	51	Thomas Lackner	Austria							
	52	Čestmír Kožíšek	Czech Republic							
	53	Jakub Kot	Poland							
	54	Alexey Romashov	Russia							
	55	Stanisław Biela	Poland							
	56	Mikhail Maksimochkin	Russia							
