= Biathlon at the 2013 European Youth Olympic Winter Festival =

- Venue: Cheile Grădiştei Arena, Fundata
- Date: 19–22 February

Biathlon at the 2013 European Youth Winter Olympic Festival is held from 19 to 22 February 2013 at the Cheile Grădiştei Arena in Fundata, Romania.

== Results ==
=== Medal table ===
Rank	Nation	Gold	Silver	Bronze	Total
1	Germany (GER)	2	2	0	4
2	France (FRA)	1	1	0	2
3	Ukraine (UKR)	1	0	1	2
4	Poland (POL)	1	0	0	1
5	Lithuania (LTU)	0	1	0	1
5	Romania (ROU)	0	1	0	1
7	Austria (AUT)	0	0	1	1
7	Belarus (BLR)	0	0	1	1
7	Estonia (EST)	0	0	1	1
7	Russia (RUS)	0	0	1	1
Totals (10 entries)		5	5	5	15

=== Men's events ===
Event	Gold		Silver		Bronze	
12.5 km Individual	Dominic Reiter (GER)	36:08.0 (0+0+0+1)	Anthony Benoit (FRA)	38:00.8 (0+0+0+1)	Viktor Plitcev (RUS)	38:27.9 (1+1+0+1)
7.5 km Sprint	Emilien Jacquelin (FRA)	21:11.3 (0+1)	Lars-Erik Weick (GER)	21:15.8 (0+2)	Viktar Kryuko (BLR)	21:17.7 (1+1)

=== Ladies events ===
Event	Gold		Silver		Bronze	
10 km Individual	Marion Deigentesch (GER)	31:32.1 (0+0+0+1)	Gabrielė Leščinskaitė (LTU)	32:57.6 (0+0+0+0)	Tuuli Tomingas (EST)	33:09.5 (0+0+0+2)
6 km Sprint	Kinga Mitoraj (POL)	19:11.7 (0+0)	Dorottya Búzás (ROU)	19:34.1 (0+0)	Anastasiya Merkushyna (UKR)	19:37.3 (0+1)

=== Mixed events ===
Event	Gold		Silver		Bronze	
Relay	Ukraine (UKR); Anastasiya Merkushyna; Anastasiya Nychyporenko; Anton Myhda; Maksym Ivko	1:26:15.1 (4+13)	Germany (GER); Marion Deigentesch; Anna Weidel; Dominic Reiter; Lars-Erik Weick	1:26:16.6 (2+16)	Austria (AUT); Simone Kupfner; Julia Schwaiger; Patrick Wallinger; Fabian Ulmer	1:26:37.0 (0+14)
