= Sean Doherty (biathlete) =

American biathlete (born 1995)

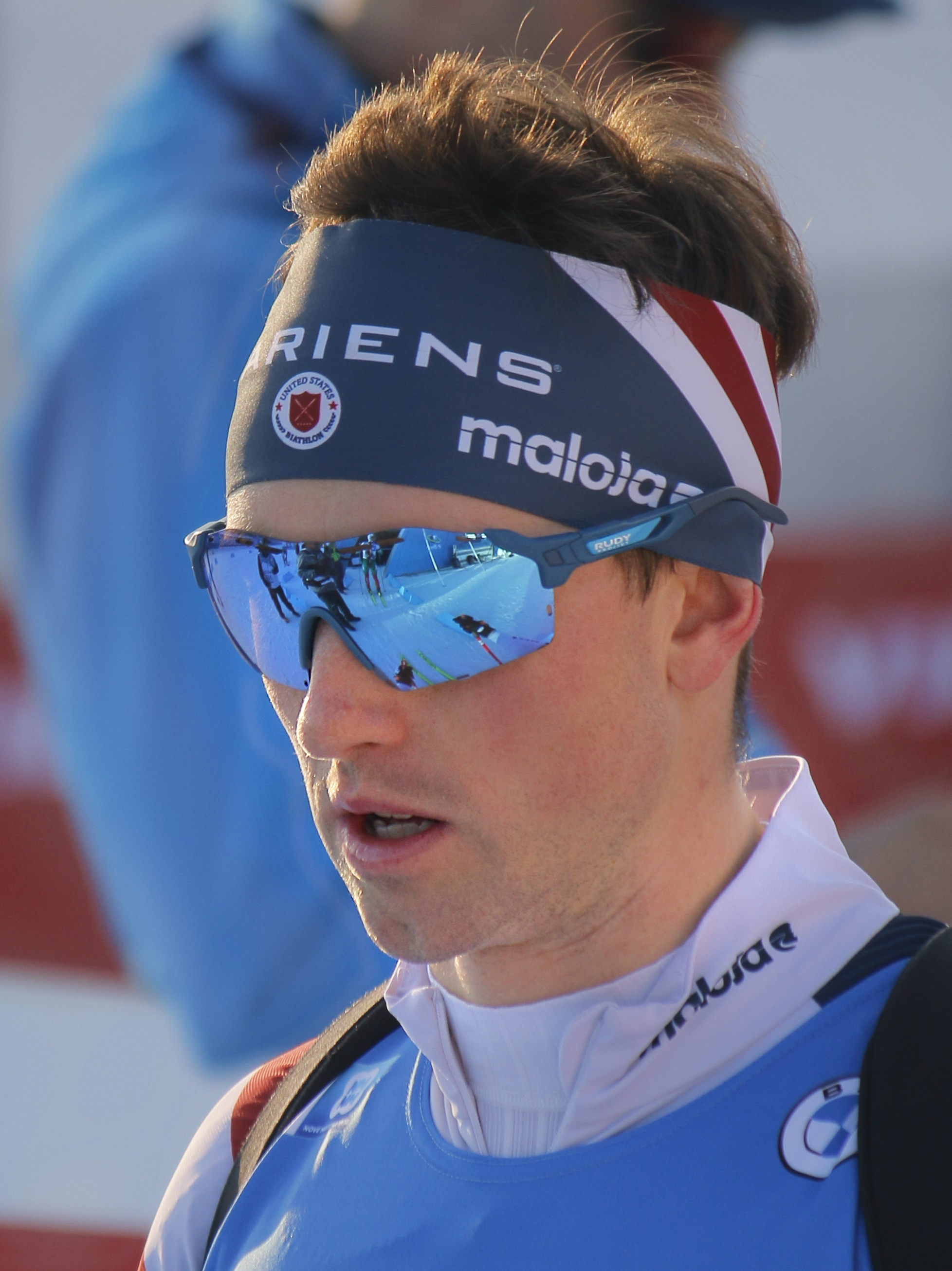
- Doherty in 2023

Personal information
- Born: June 8, 1995 (age 31) New Hampshire, United States
- Height: 6 ft 0 in (183 cm)

Sport

Professional information
- Sport: Biathlon
Medal record
Representing United States
Winter Youth Olympics
Bronze medal – third place	2012 Innsbruck	Mixed relay
Junior World Championships
Gold medal – first place	2016 Cheile Grădiştei	12.5 km pursuit
Silver medal – second place	2016 Cheile Grădiştei	10 km sprint
Bronze medal – third place	2015 Raubichi	10 km sprint
Bronze medal – third place	2016 Cheile Grădiştei	15 km individual
Youth World Championships
Gold medal – first place	2013 Obertilliach	10 km pursuit
Gold medal – first place	2014 Presque Isle	7.5 km sprint
Gold medal – first place	2014 Presque Isle	10 km pursuit
Silver medal – second place	2013 Obertilliach	7.5 km sprint
Silver medal – second place	2013 Obertilliach	12.5 km individual
Silver medal – second place	2014 Presque Isle	12.5 km individual

Sean Doherty (born June 8, 1995, in Conway, New Hampshire) is an American biathlete and four-time Olympian who has represented the United States at the 2014, 2018, 2022 and 2026 Winter Olympics. He was the youngest U.S. Olympic biathlete when he competed at the 2014 Sochi Games at age 18, and is the most decorated junior biathlete in U.S. history, with 10 Youth and Junior World Championship medals.

== Early life ==
Doherty grew up in Center Conway, New Hampshire, and began cross-country skiing at age four. He started competing in biathlon at age twelve.

== Career ==
Doherty competed at the 2014 Winter Olympics and the 2018 Winter Olympics. Among other competitions, he participated in the Biathlon World Cup opening in 2015 in November and December.

He represented the United States at the 2022 Winter Olympics.

He is a specialist in the Vermont Army National Guard.

== Biathlon results ==
All results are sourced from the International Biathlon Union.

=== Olympic Games ===
0 medals

Event	Individual	Sprint	Pursuit	Mass start	Relay	Mixed relay
(South Korea) 2018 Pyeongchang	44th	65th	—	—	6th	—
(China) 2022 Beijing	42nd	47th	43rd	—	13th	7th
(Italy) 2026 Milano Cortina	80th	65th	—	—	5th	—

=== World Championships ===
0 medals

Event	Individual	Sprint	Pursuit	Mass start	Relay	Mixed relay	Single Mixed relay
(Austria) 2017 Hochfilzen	58th	39th	55th	—	7th	16th	—
(Sweden) 2019 Oestersund	17th	22nd	—	21st	—	19th	13th
(Italy) 2020 Antholz	24th	44th	43rd	—	8th	13th	11th
(Slovenia) 2021 Pokljuka	51st	78th	—	—	15th	12th	22nd
(Germany) 2023 Oberhof	35th	80th	—	—	12th	13th	—
(Czech Republic) 2024 Nové Město na Moravě	23rd	44th	26th	28th	5th	11th	—

*During Olympic seasons competitions are only held for those events not included in the Olympic program.
**The single mixed relay was added as an event in 2019.
