= Anastasiya Merkushyna =

Ukrainian biathlete (born 1995)

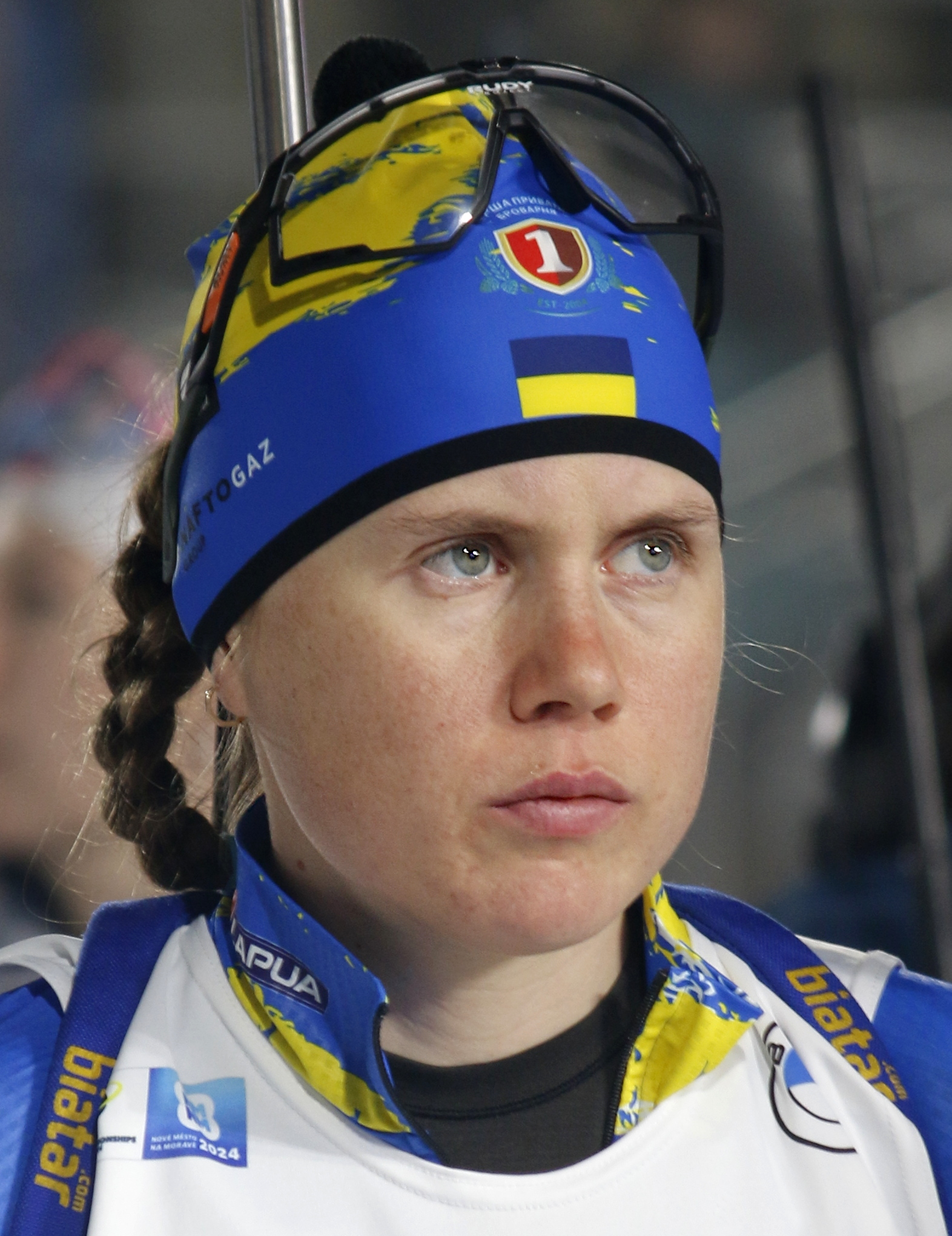
- Merkushyna in 2024

Personal information
- Nationality: Ukrainian
- Born: 14 January 1995 (age 31) Sumy, Ukraine
- Height: 1.62 m (5 ft 4 in)
- Weight: 47 kg (104 lb)

Sport

Professional information
- Club: Dynamo
- World Cup debut: 2014

Olympic Games
- Teams: 1 (2018)
- Medals: 0

World Championships
- Teams: 4 (2017–2021)
- Medals: 4 (0 gold)
Medal record
Women's biathlon
Representing Ukraine
World Championships
Silver medal – second place	2017 Hochfilzen	4 x 6 km relay
Bronze medal – third place	2019 Östersund	4 x 6 km relay
Bronze medal – third place	2020 Antholz	4 x 6 km relay
Bronze medal – third place	2021 Pokljuka	4 x 6 km relay
European Championships
Gold medal – first place	2023 Lenzerheide	Sprint
Gold medal – first place	2026 Sjusjøen	Individual
Silver medal – second place	2021 Duszniki-Zdrój	Individual
Bronze medal – third place	2017 Duszniki-Zdrój	Individual
Bronze medal – third place	2017 Duszniki-Zdrój	Mixed relay
Bronze medal – third place	2020 Raubichi	Single mixed relay
Junior World Championships
Bronze medal – third place	2016 Cheile-Gradisej	12.5 km individual
Youth World Championships
Gold medal – first place	2012 Kontiolahti	3 × 6 km relay
Silver medal – second place	2011 Nové Město	3 × 6 km relay
Silver medal – second place	2013 Obertilliach	3 × 6 km relay
Bronze medal – third place	2013 Obertilliach	10 km individual
Junior European Championships
Gold medal – first place	2015 Otepää	Sprint
Gold medal – first place	2015 Otepää	Pursuit
Gold medal – first place	2016 Pokljuka	Individual
Silver medal – second place	2014 Nové Město	Individual
Bronze medal – third place	2012 Osrblie	Mixed relay
Bronze medal – third place	2015 Otepää	Mixed relay
European Youth Olympic Festival
Gold medal – first place	2013 Braşov	Relay
Bronze medal – third place	2013 Braşov	Sprint

Anastasiya Merkushyna (Ukrainian: Анастасія Олегівна Меркушина; born 14 January 1995) is a Ukrainian biathlete. She is World Championships medalist. She participated at 2018 Winter Olympics.

== Career ==
Her first international successes were medals at Junior World and European championships. Merkushyna is a two-time bronze medalist in girls' individual at the 2013 and 2016 Junior Worlds, a two-time silver medalist in relay, a three-time Junior European champion, and a three-time European medalist. In 2012, she qualified for 2012 Winter Youth Olympics in Innsbruck, Austria, where she was 14th in both sprint and pursuit.

Before receiving a spot in the Ukrainian national team, she participated in IBU Cup competitions. Her first World Cup race was in Swedish Östersund in 2014–15 season, where she finished 51st in individual. There she also competed in sprint, finishing 87th. Then she missed two World Cup stages returning in Oberhof, Germany. Since the Ukrainian team lacked its leaders (both Sochi Olympic champions Vita Semerenko and Olena Pidhrushna missed that season), she was invited to the relay team. Merkushyna did her job well by shooting without additional shots. Nevertheless, her personal results weren't good enough to debut at the World Championships. Next season, she spent in IBU Cup competitions.

On 11 December 2016, Anastasiya Had her first relay podium in Pokljuka, Slovenia. She earned her first World Cup points in sprint in Oberhof. Since then, she has been a member of the national team regularly. She participated at 2017 Worlds, where she showed outstanding achievements for her debut: 10th in sprint, 8th in pursuit, and 14th in mass start. Merkushyna won silver in relay.

She qualified to represent Ukraine at the 2018 Winter Olympics. In Pyeongchang her best achievement was 46th place in pursuit and 11th in relay. In an interview, she was disappointed about her performance and even cried.

== Personal life ==
Her mother, Iryna Merkushina, is a former Ukrainian biathlete and 2003 World Championships silver medalist in relay. Her father, Oleh, is a coach. Anastasiya's parents were her first trainers. Her younger sister Oleksandra (born 2005) is also a biathlete.

Merkushyna studies management and international business at Ternopil National Economic University.

Fellow biathlete Erik Lesser provided his Twitter account with around 150,000 followers as a channel for Merkushyna to transmit viewpoints in March 2022, allowing some 20,000 Russians to see conditions in Ukraine following the Russian invasion of Ukraine.

On 13 March 2022, Merkushyna joined the State Border Guard Service of Ukraine; she did so "to protect the Ukrainian flag."

== Results ==
=== Olympics ===
0 medals

Event	Individual	Sprint	Pursuit	Mass start	Relay	Mixed relay
(South Korea) 2018 Pyeongchang	70th	55th	46th	—	11th	—
(China) 2022 Beijing	—	24th	25th	—	7th	—

=== World Championships ===
4 medals (1 silver, 3 bronze)

Event	Individual	Sprint	Pursuit	Mass start	Relay	Mixed relay	Single mixed relay
(Austria) 2017 Hochfilzen	33rd	10th	8th	14th	Silver	—	—N/a
(Sweden) 2019 Östersund	10th	28th	15th	25th	Bronze	7th	5th
(Italy) 2020 Antholz-Anterselva	11th	—	—	—	Bronze	5th	10th
(Slovenia) 2021 Pokljuka	13th	—	—	—	Bronze	—	—
(Germany) 2023 Oberhof	DNS	44th	49th	—	14th	10th	15th
(Czech Republic) 2024 Nové Město na Moravě	28th	29th	36th	—	5th	—	14th
(Switzerland) 2025 Lenzerheide	44th	—	—	—	11th	—	—

*During Olympic seasons competitions are only held for those events not included in the Olympic program.
**The single mixed relay was added as an event in 2019.

=== World Cup ===
==== Relay podiums ====
Season	Place	Competition	Placement
2016–17	Pokljuka, Slovenia	Relay	3
2017–18	Kontiolahti, Finland	Mixed relay	2
2018–19	Pokljuka, Slovenia	Single mixed relay	3

==== Rankings ====
Season	IN	SP	PU	MS	TOTAL
2016–17	64	32	39	39	37
2017–18	27	57	33	36	42

=== IBU Cup ===
==== Individual podiums ====
Season	Place	Competition	Rank
2014–15	Obertilliach, Austria	Sprint	2
2016–17	Ridanna, Italy	Sprint	1
2019–20	Ridanna, Italy	Super sprint	2
2019–20	Obertilliach, Austria	Short individual	2
2019–20	Obertilliach, Austria	Sprint	3

==== Relay podiums ====
Season	Place	Competition	Rank
2015–16	Ridanna, Italy	Mixed relay	3
2015–16	Arber, Germany	Single mixed relay	1
2016–17	Ridanna, Italy	Single mixed relay	1
