= Anastasiya Nychyporenko =

Ukrainian-born Moldovan biathlete (born 1995)

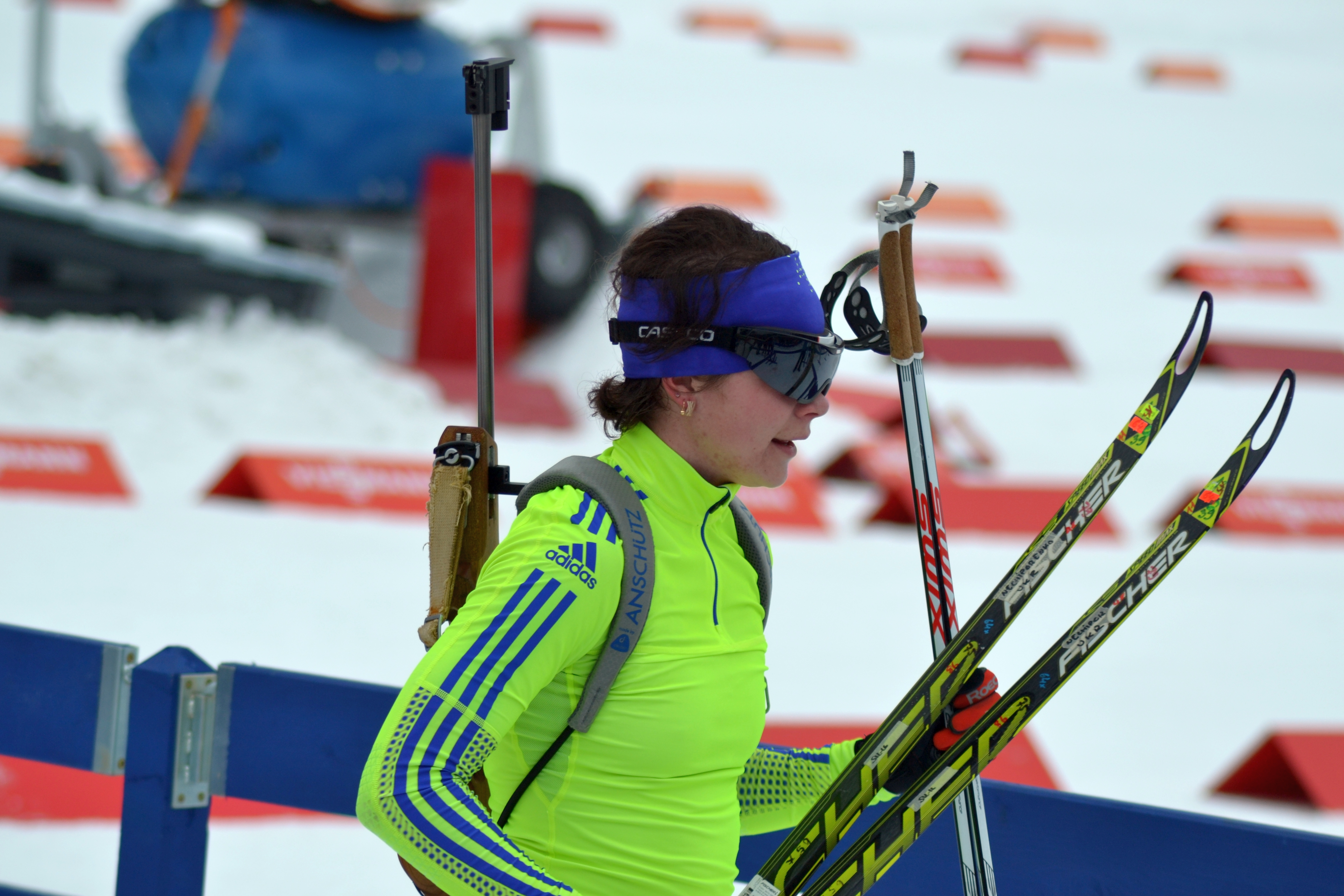

Personal information
- Born: 28 January 1995 (age 31) Berezanka, Chernihiv Oblast, Ukraine

Sport
- Sport: Skiing
Medal record
Women's biathlon
Representing Ukraine
Youth World Championships
Silver medal – second place	2013 Obertilliach	3 × 6 km relay
European Youth Olympic Festival
Gold medal – first place	2013 Braşov	Relay
- Updated on January 22, 2013

Anastasiya Nychyporenko (born 28 January 1995), also known as Anastasia Niciporenko, is a Ukrainian-born Moldovan biathlete.

== Performances ==
Level	Year	Event	IN	SP	PU	MS	RL	MRL
JBWCH	2012	Kontiolahti, Finland	46	45	45			
JBWCH	2013	Obertilliach, Austria	9	25	26		2	
