= Tereza Vinklárková =

Czech biathlete

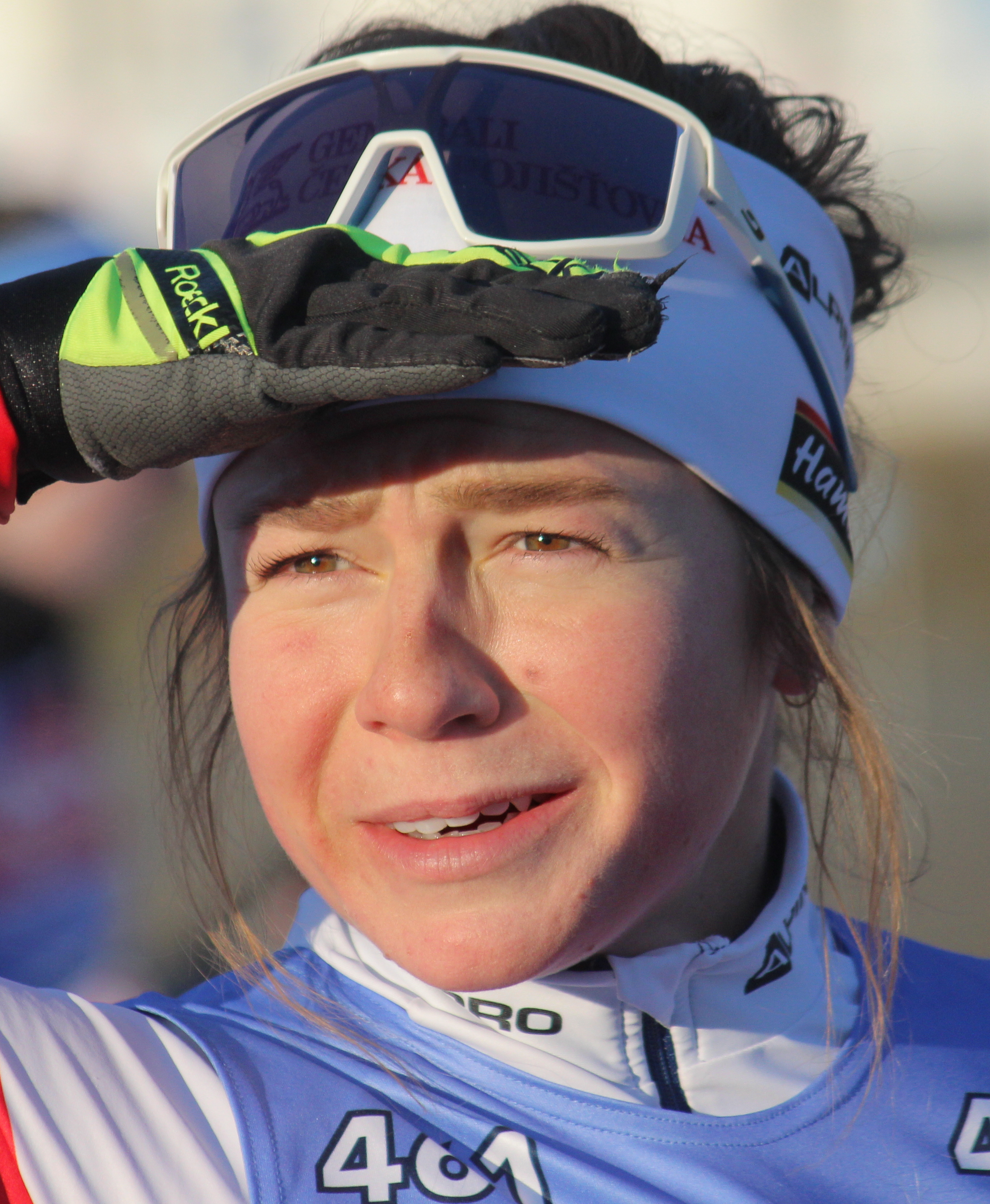
- Vinklárková in 2023

Personal information
- Nationality: Czech
- Born: 3 December 1998 (age 27) Brno, Czech Republic

Sport
- Sport: Biathlon
Medal record
Women's biathlon
Representing Czech Republic
Youth World Championships
Silver medal – second place	2016 Cheile Grădiştei	3 × 6 km relay

Tereza Vinklárková (born 3 December 1998) is a Czech biathlete. She competed at the 2026 Winter Olympics.

== Career ==
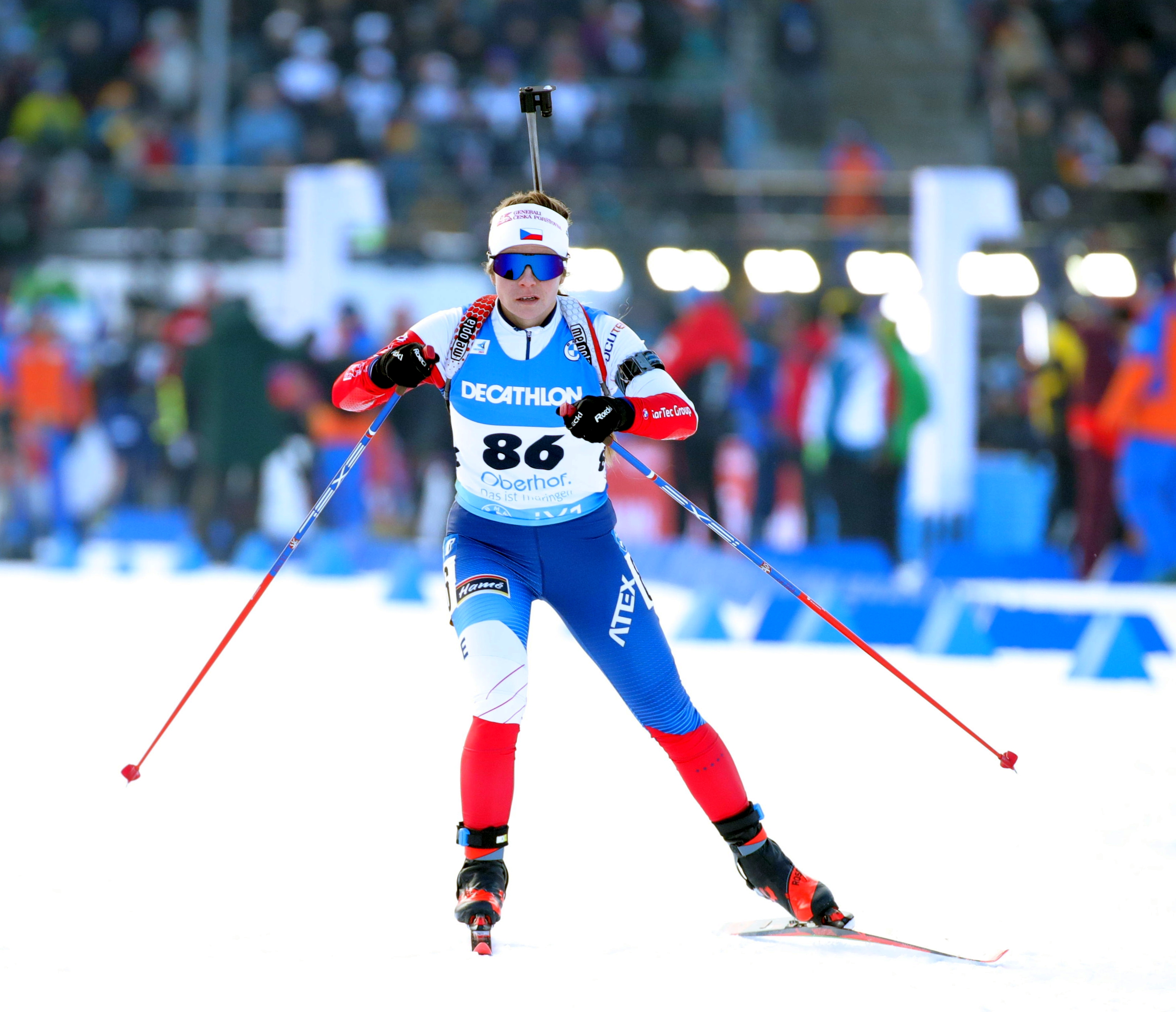
Vinklárková in 2023 World Championships in Oberhof

Tereza Vinklárková has been practicing biathlon since 2006. She made her international debut at the 2016 Junior World Championships and won a silver medal in the youth relay competition. Shortly after, she competed at the Winter Youth Olympics in Lillehammer, finishing 14th in the sprint, 16th in the pursuit, and 12th and 9th in the mixed relays. In 2017/18, the Czech athlete also competed in junior competitions, with her best result being 4th place alongside Jakub Štvrtecký at the Junior European Championships in Pokljuka. At the end of 2018, Vinklárková made her IBU Cup debut. She competed the entire season in the second-highest racing class but was unable to win any points. In early January 2020, the Czech athlete finally earned her first IBU Cup points by finishing 20th in the short individual race in Osrblie, subsequently achieving a fifth-place finish in the single mixed relay. After the 2020 Junior World Championships also went successfully with three top-10 results, Vinklárková made her debut at the highest level of the sport at the World Championships. She competed in the individual race and finished 62nd with four penalties.

At the beginning of the 2020–21 winter season, she first made her debut in the regular World Cup in Oberhof, but was sent back down after relatively weak results. In Osrblie, the Czech achieved her best career result to date with 13th place in the sprint. In August 2021, there was another good result with 9th place in the pursuit at the Summer Biathlon World Championships. In the following season, Vinklárková was part of the World Cup squad from the start and finished 29th in the sprint, her second race. She also reached two pursuit races before the turn of the year. After below-average results, the Czech spent the second half of the season in the IBU Cup again, but unlike the previous year, she did not achieve any outstanding results. She finished the season ranked 94th in the world rankings.

She competed in the 2022–23 winter in the IBU Cup up until the European Championships and achieved several top-30 results, including 16th place in the sprint in Idre. Due to Jessica Jislová withdrawing due to illness, Vinklárková was called up to the World Championships in Oberhof at short notice and finished 34th in the individual race and seventh with the women's relay. The 24-year-old competed in the last trimester in the World Cup but did not come close to the points places. In August 2023, she surprisingly won her first medal at the senior level by placing third in the sprint at the Summer Biathlon World Championships behind Tuuli Tomingas and Lisa Maria Spark. However, the following winter did not go according to plan at first. Vinklárková was removed from the World Cup team after the first trimester, where she had regularly scored points but, as at the European Championships, did not achieve top positions. Her first IBU Cup podium finish in the pursuit in Obertilliach at the end of the season was therefore a surprise, especially after she had only reached 19th place in the preceding sprint.

In the 2024–25 season, Vinklárková failed to make a leap in performance. With the exception of a tenth place in the sprint in Osrblie and second place in the single mixed competition with Tomáš Mikyska at the same location, she did not achieve any top-30 results in the IBU Cup. Her four World Cup starts during the season, including her first relay appearance, also brought no significant success.

== Biathlon results ==
All results are sourced from the International Biathlon Union.

=== Olympic Games ===
0 medals

Event	Individual	Sprint	Pursuit	Mass start	Relay	Mixed relay
(Italy) 2026 Milano-Cortina	11th	50th	51st	—	5th	—

=== World Championships ===
Event	Individual	Sprint	Pursuit	Mass start	Relay	Mixed relay	Single mixed relay
(Italy) 2020 Antholz-Anterselva	62nd	—	—	—	—	—	—
(Germany) 2023 Oberhof	34th	85th	—	—	7th	—	—

=== Youth and Junior World Championships ===
1 medal (1 silver)

Year	Age	Individual	Sprint	Pursuit	Relay
(Romania) 2016 Cheile Gradistei	17	33rd	57th	32nd	Silver
(Slovakia) 2017 Brezno-Osrblie	18	8th	32nd	23rd	9th
(Estonia) 2018 Otepää	19	47th	30th	21st	7th
(Switzerland) 2020 Lenzerheide	21	5th	6th	13th	5th
