= Hanna Sola =

Belarusian biathlete (born 1996)

Personal information
- Born: 16 February 1996 (age 30) Shumilino, Belarus
- Height: 1.71 m (5 ft 7 in)
- Weight: 71 kg (157 lb)

Sport

Professional information
- Sport: Biathlon
- Club: Belarus Club of Biathlon
- World Cup debut: 2015

World Championships
- Teams: 4 (2016, 2019–2021)
- Medals: 1 (0 gold)

World Cup
- Seasons: 4 (2015/16, 2018/19–)
- Individual victories: 1
- All victories: 1
- Individual podiums: 6
- All podiums: 10
- Overall titles: 0
- Discipline titles: 0
Medal record
World Championships
Bronze medal – third place	2021 Pokljuka	7.5 km sprint
European Championships
Bronze medal – third place	2019 Raubichi	Mixed Relay
Youth World Championships
Gold medal – first place	2015 Raubichi	3 × 6 km relay

Hanna Sola (born 16 February 1996) is a Belarusian biathlete. She has competed in the Biathlon World Cup.

She won the bronze medal in the 7.5 km sprint at the Biathlon World Championships 2021 in Pokljuka.

== Biathlon results ==
All results are sourced from the International Biathlon Union.

=== Olympic Games ===
Event	Individual	Sprint	Pursuit	Mass start	Relay	Mixed relay
(China) 2022 Beijing	54th	26th	4th	10th	13th	6th

=== World Championships ===
1 medal (1 bronze)

Event	Individual	Sprint	Pursuit	Mass start	Relay	Mixed relay	Single Mixed relay
(Norway) 2016 Oslo	—	77th	—	—	—	—	—N/a
(Sweden) 2019 Östersund	—	—	—	—	—	13th	16th
(Italy) 2020 Antholz	50th	84th	—	—	13th	—	15th
(Slovenia) 2021 Pokljuka	70th	Bronze	26th	30th	4th	—	—

*During Olympic seasons competitions are only held for those events not included in the Olympic program.
**The single mixed relay was added as an event in 2019.
