= Felix Leitner =

Austrian biathlete (born 1996)

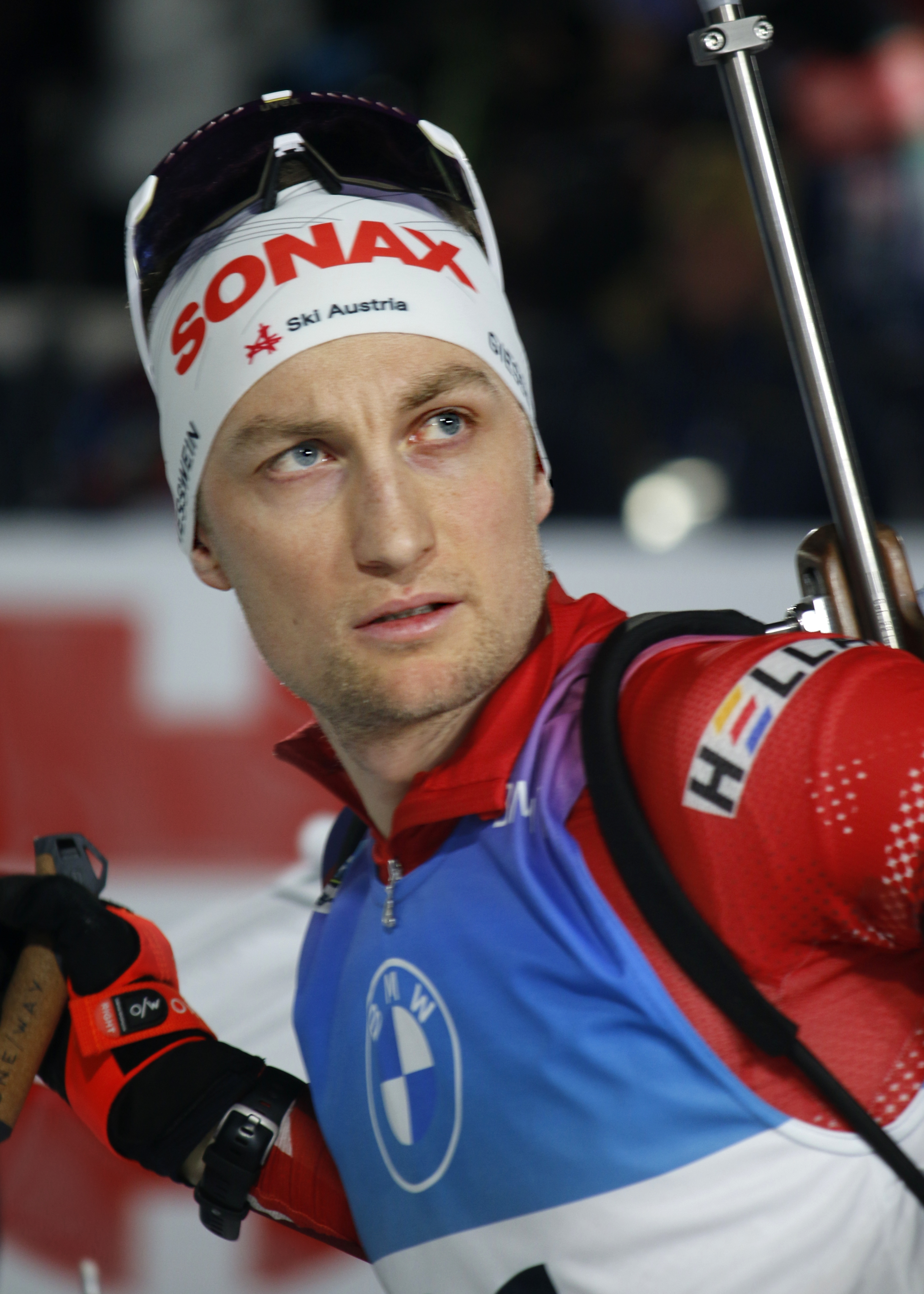
- Leitner in 2024

Personal information
- Nationality: Austrian
- Born: 31 December 1996 (age 29) Hall in Tirol, Austria
- Height: 1.71 m (5 ft 7 in)
- Weight: 56 kg (123 lb)

Sport

Professional information
- Sport: Biathlon
- Club: SCV Bernau
- World Cup debut: 3 December 2016

World Cup
- Individual podiums: 1
- All podiums: 3
Medal record
Men's biathlon
Representing Austria
European Championships
Silver medal – second place	2018 Ridnaun	20 km individual
Junior World Championships
Gold medal – first place	2015 Minsk	10 km pursuit
Gold medal – first place	2016 Cheile Grădiştei	15 km individual
Gold medal – first place	2016 Cheile Grădiştei	10 km sprint
Silver medal – second place	2015 Minsk	7.5 km sprint
Bronze medal – third place	2016 Cheile Grădiştei	12.5 km pursuit
- Updated on 23 March 2024

Felix Leitner (born 31 December 1996) is an Austrian former biathlete. He made his World Cup debut in December 2016, and won the 20 km individual race at the 2018 IBU Open European Championships. He competed in six events at the 2022 Winter Olympics, with his best placing being 10th in the pursuit. Leitner took his first individual World Cup podium on 17 January 2021 in the 15 km mass start event.

His brother Clemens competes as a ski jumper.

== Biathlon results ==
All results are sourced from the International Biathlon Union.

=== Olympic Games ===
0 medals

Event	Individual	Sprint	Pursuit	Mass start	Relay	Mixed relay
(China) 2022 Beijing	16th	46th	10th	29th	10th	10th

=== World Championships ===
0 medals

Event	Individual	Sprint	Pursuit	Mass start	Relay	Mixed relay	Single mixed relay
(Sweden) 2019 Östersund	30th	36th	22nd	19th	8th	—	—
(Italy) 2020 Rasen-Antholz	27th	9th	9th	6th	6th	8th	—
(Slovenia) 2021 Pokljuka	14th	51st	44th	—	10th	—	—
(Czech Republic) 2024 Nové Město na Moravě	57th	49th	39th	—	12th	—	—

*During Olympic seasons competitions are only held for those events not included in the Olympic program.
