= Biathlon Junior World Championships 2016 =

Biathlon championships held in Cheile Grâdiştei, Romania in 2016

2016 IBU Youth & Junior World Championships
- Host city: Cheile Grădiştei, Romania
- Dates: 27 January – 2 February
- Events: 16

The 2016 Biathlon Junior World Championships was held in Cheile Grădiştei, Romania from January 27 to February 2, 2016. There was a total of 16 competitions: sprint, pursuit, individual, and relay races for men and women.

== Schedule ==
All times are local (UTC+2).

Date	Time	Event
27 January	10:00	Youth Women's 10 km individual
27 January	13:30	Youth Men's 12.5 km individual
28 January	10:00	Junior Women's 12.5 km individual
28 January	13:30	Junior Men's 15 km individual
29 January	10:00	Youth Women's 6 km sprint
29 January	13:30	Youth Men's 7.5 km sprint
30 January	10:00	Junior Women's 7.5 km sprint
30 January	13:30	Junior Men's 10 km sprint
31 January	10:00	Youth Women's 7.5 km pursuit
31 January	11:00	Junior Women's 10 km pursuit
31 January	13:30	Youth Men's 10 km pursuit
31 January	14:30	Junior Men's 12.5 km sprint
1 February	10:00	Youth Women's 3 × 6 km relay
1 February	13:30	Youth Men's 3 × 7.5 km relay
2 February	10:00	Junior Women's 3 × 6 km relay
2 February	13:30	Junior Men's 4 × 7.5 km relay

== Medal winners ==
=== Youth Women ===
Event:	Gold:	Time	Silver:	Time	Bronze:	Time
10 km Individual details	Marina Sauter; Germany	35:14.2 (0+1+1+0)	Myrtille Begue; France	35:16.2 (0+1+0+1)	Markéta Davidová; Czech Republic	35:26.9 (0+1+2+0)
6 km Sprint details	Karoline Erdal; Norway	18:17.7 (0+1)	Emilie Kalkenberg; Norway	18:46.2 (0+1)	Anna Kryvonos; Ukraine	18:50.1 (0+1)
7.5 km Pursuit details	Arina Pantova; Kazakhstan	27:15.2 (1+0+0+0)	Anna Kryvonos; Ukraine	27:18.6 (0+0+1+2)	Marina Sauter; Germany	28:18.1 (0+1+0+1)
3 × 6 km Relay details	Russia; Iaroslava Pervakova; Valeriia Vasnetcova; Polina Shevnina	55:33.8 (0+0) (0+2) (0+2) (0+1) (0+2) (0+1)	Czech Republic; Natálie Jurčová; Markéta Davidová; Tereza Vinklárková	55:58.4 (0+3) (0+1) (0+0) (0+1) (0+1) (0+0)	Norway; Kristina Skjevdal; Emilie Kalkenberg; Karoline Erdal	56:21.9 (0+1) (0+3) (0+2) (1+3) (0+0) (0+2)

=== Junior Women ===
Event:	Gold:	Time	Silver:	Time	Bronze:	Time
12.5 km Individual details	Susanna Kurzthaler; Austria	37:57.2 (0+0+0+0)	Anastasiya Merkushyna; Ukraine	38:05.8 (0+1+0+0)	Julia Schwaiger; Austria	38:45.6 (0+0+0+0)
7.5 km Sprint details	Hanna Öberg; Sweden	21:18.1 (0+0)	Lena Häcki; Switzerland	21:18.7 (0+2)	Anna Magnusson; Sweden	21:30.5 (0+1)
10 km Pursuit details	Hanna Öberg; Sweden	33:16.8 (0+0+0+0)	Lena Häcki; Switzerland	33:30.5 (0+2+3+1)	Chloé Chevalier; France	33:58.7 (2+0+0+0)
3 × 6 km Relay details	Norway; Anne Marit Bredalen; Turi Storstrøm Thoresen; Ingrid Landmark Tandrevold	55:26.3 (0+0) (0+0) (0+1) (0+1) (0+1) (0+2)	Sweden; Anna Magnusson; Sofia Myhr; Hanna Öberg	55:41.9 (0+0) (0+1) (0+0) (0+1) (0+0) (0+2)	Austria; Susanna Kurzthaler; Julia Schwaiger; Simone Kupfner	56:21.8 (0+0) (0+2) (0+0) (0+0) (0+2) (0+3)

=== Youth Men ===
Event:	Gold:	Time	Silver:	Time	Bronze:	Time
12.5 km Individual details	Harald Øygard; Norway	37:00.3 (0+1+0+0)	Aleksander Fjeld Andersen; Norway	37:41.1 (1+0+0+0)	Michael Durand; Italy	38:10.3 (0+0+0+0)
7.5 km Sprint details	Igor Malinovskii; Russia	20:32.9 (1+0)	Endre Strømsheim; Norway	20:59.2 (0+0)	Viacheslav Maleev; Russia	21:00.3 (1+1)
10 km Pursuit details	Viacheslav Maleev; Russia	30:14.0 (0+0+1+1)	Igor Malinovskii; Russia	31:21.6 (2+1+2+2)	Harald Øygard; Norway	31:27.4 (1+0+0+1)
3 × 7.5 km Relay details	Norway; Endre Strømsheim; Aleksander Fjeld Andersen; Harald Øygard	59:30.6 (0+1) (0+2) (0+1) (0+1) (0+0) (0+3)	Russia; Egor Tutmin; Viacheslav Maleev; Igor Malinovskii	1:00:09.7 (0+0) (0+0) (0+0) (0+3) (0+0) (0+2)	Italy; Michael Durand; Peter Tumler; Daniele Cappellari	1:01:37.5 (0+0) (0+1) (0+2) (0+2) (0+1) (0+0)

=== Junior Men ===
Event:	Gold:	Time	Silver:	Time	Bronze:	Time
15 km Individual details	Felix Leitner; Austria	41:55.4 (0+1+0+0)	Andrea Baretto; Italy	43:46.2 (0+0+0+0)	Sean Doherty; United States	43:56.5 (0+0+1+1)
10 km Sprint details	Felix Leitner; Austria	26:27.1 (0+1)	Sean Doherty; United States	26:38.6 (1+1)	David Zobel; Germany	27:06.4 (0+1)
12.5 km Pursuit details	Sean Doherty; United States	36:01.1 (0+1+1+0)	Nikita Porshnev; Russia	36:30.7 (1+0+0+0)	Felix Leitner; Austria	36:39.9 (0+0+1+2)
4 × 7.5 km Relay details	Russia; Dmitrii Shamaev; Viktor Plitcev; Nikita Porshnev; Kirill Streltsov	1:23:56.7 (0+0) (0+0) (0+0) (0+0) (0+0) (0+0) (0+0) (0+2)	Germany; Marco Groß; David Zobel; Lars-Erik Weick; Dominic Reiter	1:25:56.3 (0+0) (0+0) (0+3) (0+1) (0+1) (0+2) (0+0) (0+1)	Czech Republic; David Tolar; Milan Žemlička; Ondřej Hošek; Jan Burian	1:27:02.5 (0+0) (0+0) (0+1) (0+2) (0+0) (0+1) (0+0) (0+2)

== Medal table ==
Rank	Nation	Gold	Silver	Bronze	Total
1	Norway (NOR)	4	3	2	9
2	Russia (RUS)	4	3	1	8
3	Austria (AUT)	3	0	3	6
4	Sweden (SWE)	2	1	1	4
5	Germany (GER)	1	1	2	4
6	United States (USA)	1	1	1	3
7	Kazakhstan (KAZ)	1	0	0	1
8	Ukraine (UKR)	0	2	1	3
9	Switzerland (SUI)	0	2	0	2
10	Czech Republic (CZE)	0	1	2	3
10	Italy (ITA)	0	1	2	3
12	France (FRA)	0	1	1	2
Totals (12 entries)		16	16	16	48
