= Alpine skiing at the 2017 Winter Universiade – Men's super-G =

The men's super-G competition of the 2017 Winter Universiade was held at Shymbulak Ski Resort, Almaty, Kazakhstan on January 30, 2017.

== Results ==
Rank	Bib	Name	Country	Time	Difference
1st place, gold medalist(s)	3	Michelangelo Tentori	Italy	1:03.03	
2nd place, silver medalist(s)	1	Evgenij Pyasik	Russia	1:03.06	+0.03
3rd place, bronze medalist(s)	11	Simon Efimov	Russia	1:03.77	+0.74
4	4	Marko Vukićević	Serbia	1:03.88	+0.85
5	10	Tobias Kogler	Austria	1:03.96	+0.93
6	9	Paweł Babicki	Poland	1:04.10	+1.07
7	2	Marko Stevovic	Serbia	1:04.22	+1.19
8	13	Konstantin Riabitca	Russia	1:04.35	+1.32
9	43	Zan Kralj	Slovenia	1:04.45	+1.42
10	7	Daniel Paulus	Czech Republic	1:04.78	+1.75
11	15	Gennadiy Svitkov	Russia	1:04.93	+1.90
12	6	Martin Khuber	Kazakhstan	1:05.17	+2.14
13	50	Martin Stricker	Switzerland	1:05.18	+2.15
14	24	Kristaps Zvejnieks	Latvia	1:05.23	+2.20
15	8	Athos Casartelli	Italy	1:05.47	+2.44
16	31	Henrich Katrenic	Slovakia	1:05.67	+2.64
17	14	William Schuessler Bedard	Canada	1:05.68	+2.65
18	39	Yannik Dobler	Switzerland	1:05.72	+2.69
19	18	Gian-Andrea Hehli	Switzerland	1:05.79	+2.76
20	29	Adam Kotzmann	Czech Republic	1:05.80	+2.77
21	45	Shun Nakamura	Japan	1:05.84	+2.81
22	19	Maksim Stukov	Russia	1:05.97	+2.94
23	33	Hideyuki Narita	Japan	1:05.98	+2.95
24	38	Jakub Kłusak	Poland	1:05.99	+2.96
25	35	Giacomo Rigamonti	Italy	1:06.22	+3.19
26	5	Carlo Beretta	Italy	1:06.31	+3.28
27	36	Christof Gruber	Austria	1:06.39	+3.36
28	22	Axel Beguelin	Switzerland	1:06.50	+3.47
29	46	Adam Zika	Czech Republic	1:06.66	+3.63
30	28	Kim Dong-woo	South Korea	1:06.68	+3.65
31	23	Jan Napotnik	Czech Republic	1:06.85	+3.82
32	26	Andrés Figueroa	Chile	1:06.92	+3.89
33	21	Andrey Ushakov	Russia	1:06.98	+3.95
34	27	Justin Beaurivage	Canada	1:07.05	+4.02
35	25	Antonio Vittori	Italy	1:07.06	+4.03
36	34	Filippo Beretta	Italy	1:07.34	+4.31
37	55	Zakhar Kuchin	Kazakhstan	1:07.40	+4.37
38	44	Jo Kwang-ho	South Korea	1:07.61	+4.58
39	51	Sergey Danov	Kazakhstan	1:08.20	+5.17
40	69	Andrija Vukovic	Serbia	1:08.60	+5.57
41	42	Evgeniy Timofeev	Kyrgyzstan	1:08.64	+5.61
42	52	Gian Zelger	Switzerland	1:08.77	+5.74
43	72	Olaf Borsboom	Netherlands	1:08.92	+5.89
43	47	Lee Jang-woo	South Korea	1:08.92	+5.89
45	37	Alexandr Kostrov	Kazakhstan	1:09.08	+6.05
46	61	Dominik Białobrzycki	Poland	1:09.35	+6.32
47	49	Choi Chang-hyun	South Korea	1:09.36	+6.33
48	63	Rokas Zaveckas	Lithuania	1:09.39	+6.36
49	41	Alexey Syssoyev	Kazakhstan	1:09.50	+6.47
50	54	Lucas Oppliger	Chile	1:09.99	+6.96
51	56	Erik Ohlsson	Sweden	1:10.21	+7.18
52	68	Kim Dong-cheul	South Korea	1:10.87	+7.84
53	64	Jeffrey Zina	Lebanon	1:11.43	+8.40
54	53	Kamiljon Tukhtaev	Uzbekistan	1:11.87	+8.84
55	75	Andriy Mariichyn	Ukraine	1:13.10	+10.07
56	74	Sten-Mark Virro	Estonia	1:14.06	+11.03
57	66	Bertold Szepesi	Hungary	1:14.62	+11.59
58	70	Taras Kovbasnyuk	Ukraine	1:20.62	+17.59
59	73	Damir Bukharbaev	Uzbekistan	1:24.39	+21.36
60	71	Ihor Ham	Ukraine	1:26.04	+23.01
	12	Michał Kłusak	Poland	DNF	
	16	Vincent Lajoie	Canada	DNF	
	17	Andrzej Dziedzic	Poland	DNF	
	20	Martin Hyska	Slovakia	DNF	
	32	Matej Falat	Slovakia	DNF	
	40	Lee Dong-geun	South Korea	DNF	
	48	Nicola Niemeyer	Switzerland	DNF	
	57	Martin Stepan	Czech Republic	DNF	
	58	Petr Kral	Czech Republic	DNF	
	59	Tomas Bacigalupo	Argentina	DNF	
	62	Levko Tsibelenko	Ukraine	DNF	
	67	Gabriel Mains	Canada	DNF	
	30	Ivan Kovbasnyuk	Ukraine	DNS	
	60	Stefan Prisadov	Bulgaria	DNS	
	65	Georgi Nushev	Bulgaria	DNS	
