= Susanna Kurzthaler =

Austrian biathlete (born 1995)

Personal information
- Nationality: Austrian
- Born: 16 May 1995 (age 31) Innsbruck, Austria

Sport
- Country: Austria
- Sport: Biathlon
Medal record
Junior World Championships
Gold medal – first place	2016 Cheile Grădiştei	12.5 km individual
Bronze medal – third place	2016 Cheile Grădiştei	3 × 6 km relay

Susanna Kurzthaler (born 16 May 1995) is an Austrian biathlete. She was born in Innsbruck. She won a gold medal at the Biathlon Junior World Championships 2016, and represented Austria at the Biathlon World Championships 2016.
