= Anna Kryvonos =

Ukrainian biathlete (born 1997)

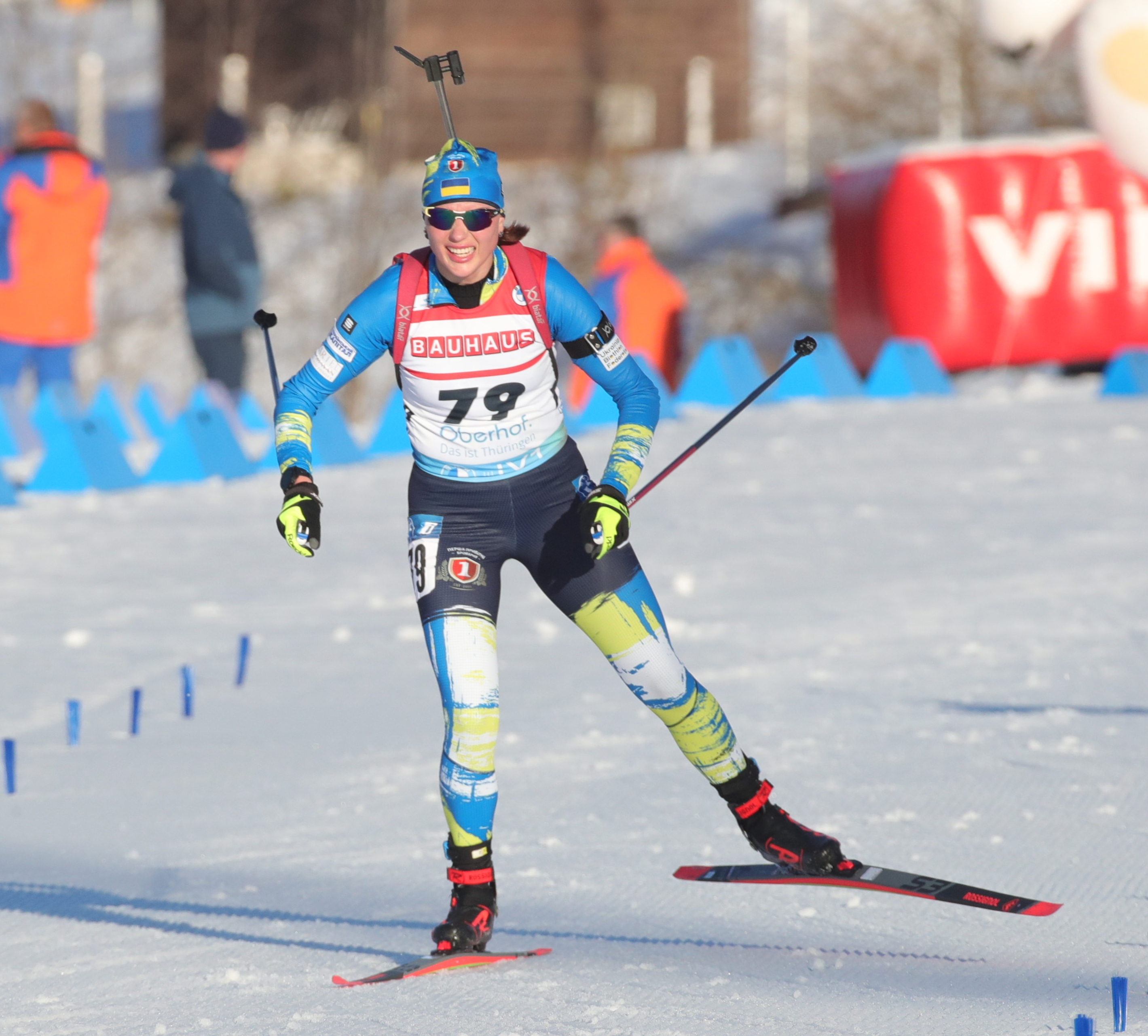
- Kryvonos in 2023

Personal information
- Nationality: Ukrainian
- Born: 25 September 1997 (age 28) Hlukhiv, Ukraine

Sport
- Country: Ukraine
- Sport: Biathlon
Medal record
Representing Ukraine
Junior World Championships
Silver medal – second place	2018 Otepää	12.5 km Individual
Youth World Championships
Gold medal – first place	2015 Raubichi	10 km Individual
Silver medal – second place	2016 Cheile Gradistei	7.5 km Pursuit
Bronze medal – third place	2016 Cheile Gradistei	6 km Sprint

Anna Kryvonos (born 25 September 1997) is a Ukrainian biathlete. She made her Biathlon World Cup debut in 2019. She is the 2015 World Youth Champion in the individual race. Two-time medalist at the 2016 World Youth Biathlon Championships in sprint and pursuit. Silver medalist at the 2018 World Junior Biathlon Championships in the individual race.

== Biography ==
Anna Kryvonos was born in Hlukhiv, Sumy Oblast. She studies at the Hlukhiv National Pedagogical University of Oleksandr Dovzhenko. Her first year in biathlon was in 2008, and she has been a member of the Ukrainian youth team since 2014.

At the 2024 World Championships in Nové Město she achieved her best result of 26th place in the individual race.

== Biathlon results ==
All results are sourced from the International Biathlon Union.

=== World Championships ===
Event	Individual	Sprint	Pursuit	Mass start	Relay	Mixed relay	Single mixed relay
(Germany) 2023 Oberhof	85th	—	—	—	—	—	—
(Czech Republic) 2024 Nové Město	26th	—	—	—	—	—	—

=== World Cup ===
==== Overall standings ====
Season	Age	Overall			Individual		Sprint		Pursuit		Mass start	
Season	Age	Races	Points	Position	Points	Position	Points	Position	Points	Position	Points	Position
2018–19	21	1/25	Didn't earn World Cup points									
2022–23	25	8/20	Didn't earn World Cup points									
2023–24	26	6/21	1	94th	1	69th	—	—	—	—	—	—
2024–25	27	6/21	Didn't earn World Cup points									

=== Youth and Junior World Championships ===
4 medal (1 gold, 2 silver, 1 bronze)

Year	Age	Individual	Sprint	Pursuit	Relay
(Belarus) 2015 Minsk	17	Gold	9th	16th	7th
(Romania) 2016 Cheile Gradistei	18	11th	Bronze	Silver	4th
(Slovakia) 2017 Brezno-Osrblie	19	14th	20th	23th	9th
(Estonia) 2018 Otepää	20	Silver	27th	14th	13th
(Slovakia) 2019 Brezno-Osrblie	21	16th	10th	17th	13th
