= Alexander Ketzer =

German biathlete

Personal information
- Full name: Alexander Ketzer
- Born: 10 November 1993 (age 32) Ostfildern-Ruit, Baden-Württemberg, Germany

Sport

Professional information
- Sport: Biathlon
- Club: SZ Uhingen
- Skis: Fischer
Medal record
Men's biathlon
Representing Germany
Junior World Championships
Gold medal – first place	2014 Presque Isle	4 × 7.5 km relay
Junior German Championships
Gold medal – first place	2012 Oberhof	Relay
Gold medal – first place	2013 Arber	Relay
Gold medal – first place	2013 Ruhpolding	Sprint
Gold medal – first place	2014 Altenberg	Individual
Silver medal – second place	2012 Oberhof	Individual
Silver medal – second place	2013 Arber	Individual
Silver medal – second place	2014 Altenberg	Relay

Alexander Ketzer (born 10 November 1993) is a German biathlete. He is a member of the B2-Kader (junior category of the German Ski Association).

Ketzer was 16 years old when he joined the ski camp. After his graduation in 2012, he became a member of the sport division of the Bundeswehr (German army) and participated in the Junior Championships. Since 2014 he has been training at the German Ski Association school in Ruhpolding, where he joined Team SZ Uhingen.

== Career ==
- Biathlon Junior World Championships, 2014 Presque Isle (United States)
- European Junior Games (EYOWF) — Bronze, 2011 Czech Republic
- Winner of German Championships in sprint, Clausthal-Zellerfeld, 2010
- German Junior Championships:
  - 1st place in Relay, 2012 Oberhof
  - 1st place in Relay, 2013 Großer Arbersee
  - 1st place in classic Sprint, 2013 Ruhpolding
  - 1st place in Individual, 2014 Altenberg
  - 2nd place in Individual, 2012 Oberhof
  - 2nd place in Individual, 2013 Großer Arbersee
  - 2nd place in Relay, 2014 Altenberg
