= Darya Blashko =

Ukrainian biathlete (born 1996)

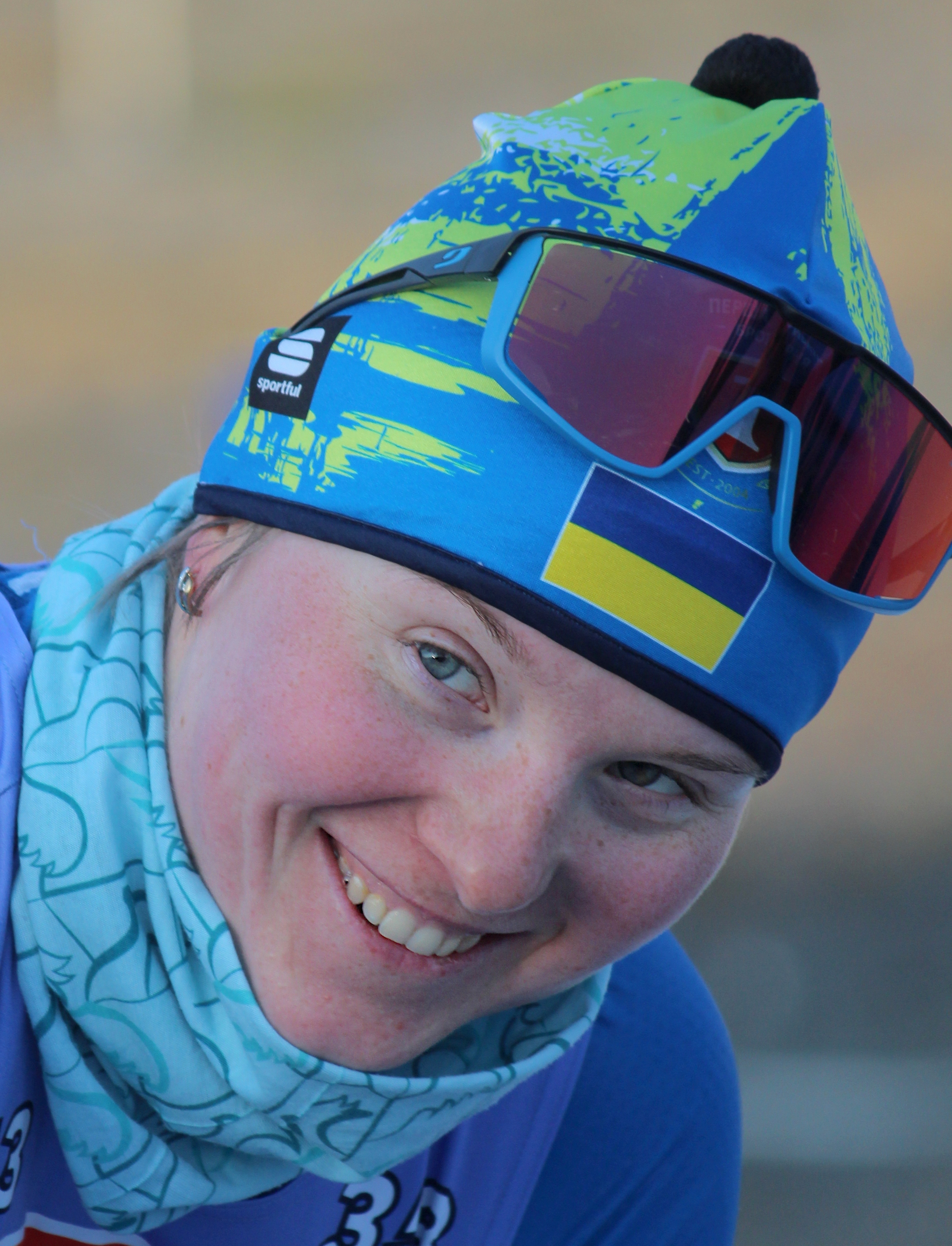

Personal information
- Nationality: Ukrainian
- Born: 28 January 1996 (age 30) Novopolotsk, Belarus
- Height: 1.76 m (5 ft 9 in)
- Weight: 61 kg (134 lb)

Sport

Professional information
- Sport: Biathlon
- World Cup debut: 2019

World Championships
- Teams: 1 (2021)
- Medals: 1 (0 gold)

World Cup
- Seasons: 2 (2019/20–2023/24)
- Individual victories: 0
- All victories: 0
- Individual podiums: 0
- All podiums: 1
- Overall titles: 0
- Discipline titles: 0
Medal record
Representing Ukraine
World Championships
| Bronze medal – third place | 2021 Pokljuka | 4 x 6 km relay |
Representing Belarus
Youth World Championships
| Gold medal – first place | 2015 Raubichi | 6 km sprint |
| Gold medal – first place | 2015 Raubichi | 3 × 6 km relay |

Darya Blashko (Ukrainian: Дарія Блашко, born 28 January 1996) is a Ukrainian former biathlete. She has competed in the Biathlon World Cup since 2019.

== Biography ==
She has been engaged in biathlon since 2006. Her trainers were Boris Vorobyov, Raisa Vorobyova and Volodymyr Makhlayev. She started her international tournaments carre in 2012. Her first major tournament was the World Junior Championship in 2013 in Obertilliach. She also participated in the 2014 European Junior Championship in Nové Město na Moravě.

== Results ==
=== Olympic Games ===
0 medals

| Event | Individual | Sprint | Pursuit | Mass start | Relay | Mixed relay |
|---|---|---|---|---|---|---|
| (China) 2022 Beijing | DNS | — | — | — | — | — |

=== World Championships ===
1 medal (1 bronze)

| Event | Individual | Sprint | Pursuit | Mass start | Relay | Mixed relay | Single mixed relay |
|---|---|---|---|---|---|---|---|
| (Slovenia) 2021 Pokljuka | – | 14th | 24th | 29th | Bronze | – | 4th |
| (Germany) 2023 Oberhof | — | 84th | — | — | 14th | — | — |

== Awards ==
- Medal "For Labor and Victory" (March 8, 2021)
