= Biathlon Junior World Championships 2014 =

Biathlon event in the United States

The 2014 Biathlon Junior World Championships was held in Presque Isle, United States from February 26 to March 7, 2014. There was to be a total of 16 competitions: sprint, pursuit, individual, mass start, and relay races for men and women.

== Medal winners ==
=== Youth Women ===
| Event: | Gold: | Time | Silver: | Time | Bronze: | Time |
|---|---|---|---|---|---|---|
| 10 km individual details | Julia Schwaiger; Austria | 32:58.7 (0+0+0+0) | Lisa Vittozzi; Italy | 34.04.4 (0+1+1+0) | Liliya Davletshina; Russia | 34:24.6 (1+1+0+0) |
| 6 km sprint details | Lisa Vittozzi; Italy | 18:49.9 (0+1) | Anna Weidel; Germany | 19:02.9 (1+0) | Julia Simon; France | 19:08.2 (0+1) |
| 7.5 km pursuit details | Lisa Vittozzi; Italy | 24:39.9 (0+2+2+3) | Anna Weidel; Germany | 24:59.1 (1+1+3+1) | Estelle Mougell; France | 25.09.5 (1+1+0+1) |
| 3 × 6 km relay details | France; Estelle Mougel; Julia Simon; Lena Arnaud | 59:32.8 (0+0) (0+2) (0+1) (0+0) (0+0) (0+1) | Russia; Maria Ivanova; Tamara Voronina; Liliya Davletshina | 59:42.8 (0+1) (0+0) (0+2) (0+1) (0+2) (0+1) | Austria; Julia Schwaiger; Susana Kurzthaler; Simone Kupfner | 1:00:05.5 (0+2) (0+3) (0+2) (0+0) (0+0) (0+2) |

=== Junior Women ===
| Event: | Gold: | Time | Silver: | Time | Bronze: | Time |
|---|---|---|---|---|---|---|
| 12.5 km individual details | Luise Kummer; Germany | 36:24.0 (0+0+0+0) | Lisa Theresa Hauser; Austria | 36:43.4 (0+1+0+0) | Uliana Kaisheva; Russia | 37:21.4 (0+0+0+1) |
| 7.5 km sprint details | Evgenia Pavlova; Russia | 21:08.5 (0+0) | Galina Vishnevskaya; Kazakhstan | 21:08.8 (0+1) | Annika Knoll; Germany | 21:47.7 (1+0) |
| 10 km pursuit details | Galina Vishnevskaya; Kazakhstan | 32:26.3 (0+1+0+1) | Luise Kummer; Germany | 33:34.1 (0+0+0+0) | Sarah Beaudry; Canada | 34:44.3 (0+1+0+0) |
| 3 × 6 km relay details | Germany; Annika Knoll; Marie Heinrich; Luise Kummer | 55:47.8 (0+1) (0+0) (0+1) (0+2) (0+0) (0+0) | Russia; Evgenia Pavlova; Victoria Slivko; Uliana Kaisheva | 56:13.5 (0+3) (0+0) (0+0) (0+1) (0+1) (0+1) | Austria; Dunja Zdouc; Susanne Hoffmann; Lisa Theresa Hauser | 56:23.0 (0+3) (0+1) (0+1) (0+1) (0+2) (1+3) |

=== Youth Men ===
| Event: | Gold: | Time | Silver: | Time | Bronze: | Time |
|---|---|---|---|---|---|---|
| 12.5 km individual details | Yaroslav Kostyukov; Russia | 35:22.6 (0+0+0+0) | Sean Doherty; United States | 35:28.9 (0+1+0+1) | Émilien Jacquelin; France | 36:06.5 (0+1+1+1) |
| 7.5 km sprint details | Sean Doherty; United States | 19:35.0 (2+2) | Marco Groß; Germany | 19:36.7 (0+2) | Dmitrii Shamaev; Russia | 19:53.9 (1+2) |
| 10 km pursuit details | Sean Doherty; United States | 28:51.8 (0+0+1+2) | Marco Groß; Germany | 29:55.4 (1+0+1+1) | Dmitrii Shamaev; Russia | 30:54.5 (1+1+1+1) |
| 3 × 7.5 km relay details | Russia; Yaroslav Kostyukov; Dmitrii Shamaev; Victor Plitchev | 59:18.9 (0+1) (0+2) (0+1) (0+2) (0+0) (2+3) | Canada; Alex Dupuis; Aidan Millar; Jules Burnotte | 1:01:29.9 (0+1) (0+2) (0+1) (0+2) (1+3) (0+1) | Finland; Olli Jaakola; Teemu Huhtala; Mikko Loukkaanhuhta | 1:01:32.8 (0+0) (1+3) (0+1) (1+3) (0+3) (0+3) |

=== Junior Men ===
| Event: | Gold: | Time | Silver: | Time | Bronze: | Time |
|---|---|---|---|---|---|---|
| 15 km individual details | Tore Leren; Norway | 42:29.3 (1+1+0+0) | Aristide Bègue; France | 42:30.3 (0+0+0+0) | Dany Chavoutier; France | 43:13.2 (1+0+0+0) |
| 10 km sprint details | Alexander Povarnitsyn; Russia | 25:45.8 (0+1) | Tore Leren; Norway | 25:59.2 (0+0) | Eduard Latypov; Russia | 26:02.3 (1+1) |
| 12.5 km pursuit details | Fabien Claude; France | 33:02.8 (0+1+2+1) | Alexander Povarnitsyn; Russia | 33:13.7 (2+2+1+1) | Jarle Midthjell Gjørven; Norway | 33:26.6 (1+0+1+0) |
| 4 × 7.5 km relay details | Germany; Philipp Nawrath; Roman Rees; Alexander Ketzer; Mathias Döfer | 1:28:38.9 (0+0) (0+2) (0+1) (1+3) (0+0) (0+3) (0+0) (0+3) | France; Aristide Bègue; Clement Dumont; Dany Chavoutier; Fabien Claude | 1:28:56.5 (0+1) (0+2) (0+0) (0+0) (0+1) (0+1) (0+0) (0+3) | Russia; Matvey Eliseev; Eduard Latypov; Ivan Alekhin; Alexander Povarnitsyn | 1:30:25.2 (0+3) (1+3) (0+2) (0+2) (0+1) (0+3) (0+1) (0+2) |

== Medal table ==
* Host nation (United States)

| Rank | Nation | Gold | Silver | Bronze | Total |
|---|---|---|---|---|---|
| 1 | Russia (RUS) | 4 | 3 | 6 | 13 |
| 2 | Germany (GER) | 3 | 5 | 1 | 9 |
| 3 | France (FRA) | 2 | 2 | 4 | 8 |
| 4 | Italy (ITA) | 2 | 1 | 0 | 3 |
| 4 | United States (USA)* | 2 | 1 | 0 | 3 |
| 6 | Austria (AUT) | 1 | 1 | 2 | 4 |
| 7 | Norway (NOR) | 1 | 1 | 1 | 3 |
| 8 | Kazakhstan (KAZ) | 1 | 1 | 0 | 2 |
| 9 | Canada (CAN) | 0 | 1 | 1 | 2 |
| 10 | Finland (FIN) | 0 | 0 | 1 | 1 |
| Totals (10 entries) | | 16 | 16 | 16 | 48 |
