= Biathlon Junior World Championships 2015 =

Biathlon event in Belarus

2015 IBU Youth & Junior World Championships
- Host city: Raubichi, Belarus
- Dates: 18 February – 24 February
- Events: 16

The 2015 Biathlon Junior World Championships was held in Raubichi-Minsk, Belarus from February 18 to February 24, 2015. There was a total of 16 competitions: sprint, pursuit, individual, and relay races for men and women.

== Schedule ==
All times are local (UTC+3).

Date	Time	Event
18 February	10:00	Youth Women's 10 km individual
18 February	13:30	Youth Men's 12.5 km individual
19 February	10:00	Junior Women's 12.5 km individual
19 February	13:30	Junior Men's 15 km individual
20 February	10:00	Youth Women's 6 km sprint
20 February	13:30	Youth Men's 7.5 km sprint
21 February	10:00	Junior Women's 7.5 km sprint
21 February	13:30	Junior Men's 10 km sprint
22 February	10:00	Youth Women's 7.5 km pursuit
22 February	11:00	Junior Women's 10 km pursuit
22 February	13:30	Youth Men's 10 km pursuit
22 February	14:30	Junior Men's 12.5 km sprint
23 February	10:00	Youth Women's 3 × 6 km relay
23 February	13:30	Youth Men's 3 × 7.5 km relay
24 February	10:00	Junior Women's 3 × 6 km relay
24 February	13:30	Junior Men's 4 × 7.5 km relay

== Medal winners ==
=== Youth Women ===
Event:	Gold:	Time	Silver:	Time	Bronze:	Time
10 km Individual details	Anna Kryvonos; Ukraine	30:09.1 (0+1+0+0)	Ingrid Landmark Tandrevold; Norway	30:27.9 (0+0+1+1)	Elizaveta Kaplina; Russia	30:37.8 (1+0+0+1)
6 km Sprint details	Darya Blashko; Belarus	16:26.4 (0+0)	Julia Schwaiger; Austria	16:31.9 (0+0)	Ingrid Landmark Tandrevold; Norway	16:32.6 (0+1)
7.5 km Pursuit details	Ingrid Landmark Tandrevold; Norway	23:26.9 (0+0+1+1)	Julia Schwaiger; Austria	24:11.2 (0+1+1+0)	Simone Kupfner; Austria	24:22.4 (0+1+1+1)
3 × 6 km Relay details	Belarus; Dzinara Alimbekava; Hanna Sola; Darya Blashko	51:50.2 (0+2) (0+0) (0+1) (0+2) (0+0) (0+2)	Russia; Elizaveta Kaplina; Natalia Ushkina; Kristina Reztsova	52:04.2 (0+0) (0+2) (1+3) (0+0) (0+2) (0+2)	Norway; Kristin Vaagaa Floettum; Eline Grue; Ingrid Landmark Tandrevold	52:53.7 (0+1) (0+0) (0+1) (0+1) (0+0) (0+1)

=== Junior Women ===
Event:	Gold:	Time	Silver:	Time	Bronze:	Time
12.5 km Individual details	Yuliya Zhuravok; Ukraine	37:54.1 (0+0+0+0)	Kinga Mitoraj; Poland	37:54.3 (0+0+0+0)	Galina Vishnevskaya; Kazakhstan	38:24.2 (1+0+0+0)
7.5 km Sprint details	Lena Arnaud; France	20:40.6 (0+0)	Galina Vishnevskaya; Kazakhstan	20:43.0 (0+0)	Chloé Chevalier; France	20:53.7 (0+0)
10 km Pursuit details	Marie Heinrich; Germany	27:58.3 (0+0+0+0)	Galina Vishnevskaya; Kazakhstan	28:13.7 (0+0+1+1)	Yuliya Zhuravok; Ukraine	28:19.0 (0+0+0+0)
3 × 6 km Relay details	France; Chloé Chevalier; Julia Simon; Lena Arnaud	53:27.3 (0+2) (0+0) (0+1) (0+2) (0+0) (0+1)	Russia; Victoria Slivko; Natalia Gerbulova; Uliana Kaisheva	53:54.2 (0+2) (0+3) (0+0) (0+0) (0+0) (0+2)	Germany; Anna Weidel; Helene Therese Hendel; Marie Heinrich	55:01.0 (0+2) (0+1) (0+1) (0+2) (0+0) (0+1)

=== Youth Men ===
Event:	Gold:	Time	Silver:	Time	Bronze:	Time
12.5 km Individual details	Kirill Streltsov; Russia	35:04.8 (1+1+0+0)	Anders Emil Schiellerup; Denmark	35:09.5 (0+0+0+1)	Igor Shetko; Russia	35:20.4 (0+1+1+0)
7.5 km Sprint details	Jonas Uglem Mobakken; Norway	20:38.5 (0+0)	Felix Leitner; Austria	20:48.8 (2+0)	Mattis Haug; Norway	21:04.6 (1+0)
10 km Pursuit details	Felix Leitner; Austria	28:12.3 (0+0+0+2)	Kirill Streltsov; Russia	28:15.3 (1+0+1+0)	Mattis Haug; Norway	28:23.3 (1+0+1+0)
3 × 7.5 km Relay details	Russia; Igor Shetko; Nikita Porshnev; Kirill Streltsov	1:04:01.2 (0+0) (0+2) (0+1) (0+2) (0+0) (0+2)	Ukraine; Vitaliy Trush; Nazarii Tserbynskyi; Dmytro Ivasenko	1:04:38.9 (0+1) (0+1) (0+2) (0+1) (0+2) (0+1)	Norway; Jonas Uglem Mobakken; Andreas Kjeverud Eggen; Mattis Haug	1:06:03.7 (0+1) (0+3) (1+3) (0+2) (0+2) (0+0)

=== Junior Men ===
Event:	Gold:	Time	Silver:	Time	Bronze:	Time
15 km Individual details	Aristide Begue; France	39:12.0 (0+0+0+0)	Aleksandr Dediukin; Russia	39:15.8 (0+0+0+0)	Vemund Gurigard; Norway	40:39.1 (0+0+0+0)
10 km Sprint details	Aleksandr Dediukin; Russia	24:49.0 (0+0)	Fabien Claude; France	24:53.6 (0+1)	Sean Doherty; United States	24:59.2 (0+1)
12.5 km Pursuit details	Eduard Latypov; Russia	35:02.8 (1+0+1+0)	Vemund Gurigard; Norway	35:27.2 (0+0+0+2)	Alexander Povarnitsyn; Russia	35:30.9 (2+0+1+2)
4 × 7.5 km Relay details	Russia; Aleksandr Dediukin; Viktor Tretiakov; Eduard Latypov; Alexander Povarnitsyn	1:19:59.7 (0+0) (0+0) (0+0) (0+2) (0+0) (0+1) (0+0) (0+1)	Norway; Andreas Kvam; Henrik Sagosen Smeby; Aslak Nenseter; Vemund Gurigard	1:21:12.2 (0+2) (0+0) (0+0) (0+1) (0+1) (0+1) (0+0) (0+0)	France; Aristide Begue; Felix Cottet Puinel; Émilien Jacquelin; Fabien Claude	1:21:22.3 (0+0) (0+0) (0+3) (0+2) (0+0) (0+1) (0+2) (0+0)

== Medal table ==
* Host nation (Belarus)

Rank	Nation	Gold	Silver	Bronze	Total
1	Russia (RUS)	5	4	3	12
2	France (FRA)	3	1	2	6
3	Norway (NOR)	2	3	6	11
4	Ukraine (UKR)	2	1	1	4
5	Belarus (BLR)*	2	0	0	2
6	Austria (AUT)	1	3	1	5
7	Germany (GER)	1	0	1	2
8	Kazakhstan (KAZ)	0	2	1	3
9	Denmark (DEN)	0	1	0	1
9	Poland (POL)	0	1	0	1
11	United States (USA)	0	0	1	1
Totals (11 entries)		16	16	16	48
