= Maksym Ivko =

Ukrainian biathlete (born 1995)

Personal information
- Full name: Maksym Ivko
- Born: 6 January 1995 (age 31) Chernihiv, Ukraine

Sport
- Sport: Skiing
Medal record
Men's biathlon
Representing Ukraine
Winter Universiade
Bronze medal – third place	2017 Almaty	Mixed relay
European Youth Olympic Festival
Gold medal – first place	2013 Braşov	Relay
- Updated on January 22, 2013

Maksym Ivko (born 6 January 1995) is a Ukrainian biathlete. He competed in the Biathlon Junior World Championships in 2012 and 2013.

== Performances ==
Level	Year	Event	IN	SP	PU	MS	RL	MRL
JBWCH	2012	Kontiolahti, Finland	25	17	11		8	
JBWCH	2013	Obertilliach, Austria	34	5	17		7	
