= Biathlon Junior World Championships 2013 =

Biathlon event in Austria

The 2013 Biathlon Junior World Championships was held in Obertilliach, Austria from January 25 to February 1 2013. There was to be a total of 16 competitions: sprint, pursuit, individual, mass start, and relay races for men and women.

== Medal winners ==
=== Youth Women ===
Event:	Gold:	Time	Silver:	Time	Bronze:	Time
10 km individual details	Uliana Kaisheva; Russia	32:41.1 (1+0+1+0)	Yuliya Zhuravok; Ukraine	34.02.0 (0+1+0+1)	Anastasiya Merkushyna; Ukraine	34:13.5 (0+2+0+1)
6 km sprint details	Uliana Kaisheva; Russia	18:08.7 (0+1)	Lisa Vittozzi; Italy	19:09.2 (0+0)	Svetlana Mironova; Russia	19:22.1 (0+1)
7.5 km pursuit details	Uliana Kaisheva; Russia	26:44.4 (1+1+1+1)	Galina Vishnevskaya; Kazakhstan	28:00.0 (0+0+0+1)	Marion Deigentesch; Germany	28:40.8 (0+0+1+0)
3 × 6 km relay details	Russia; Svetlana Mironova; Victoria Slivko; Uliana Kaisheva	55:06.6 (0+3) (0+3) (0+0) (0+2) (0+2) (0+1)	Ukraine; Yuliya Zhuravok; Anastasiya Nychyporenko; Anastasiya Merkushyna	55:35.1 (0+1) (0+1) (0+1) (0+2) (0+0) (0+0)	Switzerland; Tanja Bissig; Lena Häcki; Sabine Di Lallo	56:48.9 (0+0) (0+2) (0+3) (0+0) (0+0) (0+1)

=== Junior Women ===
Event:	Gold:	Time	Silver:	Time	Bronze:	Time
12.5 km individual details	Laura Dahlmeier; Germany	39:48.2 (1+0+0+1)	Lisa Theresa Hauser; Austria	40:32.1 (0+1+0+1)	Franziska Preuß; Germany	40:49.8 (1+0+0+1)
7.5 km sprint details	Laura Dahlmeier; Germany	23:08.2 (0+0)	Olga Podchufarova; Russia	23:56.2 (0+3)	Lisa Theresa Hauser; Austria	24:06.1 (0+0)
10 km pursuit details	Olga Podchufarova; Russia	32:47.0 (0+1+1+1)	Laura Dahlmeier; Germany	33:04.4 (0+0+3+2)	Franziska Preuß; Germany	33:11.7 (0+1+1+1)
3 × 6 km relay details	Germany; Franziska Preuß; Vanessa Hinz; Laura Dahlmeier	52:23.5 (0+1) (0+0) (0+0) (0+0) (0+0) (0+0)	Ukraine; Yuliya Bryhynets; Alla Ghilenko; Iryna Varvynets	54:42.8 (0+1) (0+0) (0+1) (0+1) (1+3) (0+1)	Russia; Viktoriya Perminova; Olga Podchufarova; Elena Ankudinova	55:04.2 (0+0) (0+2) (0+0) (1+3) (0+1) (1+3)

=== Youth Men ===
Event:	Gold:	Time	Silver:	Time	Bronze:	Time
12.5 km individual details	Aristide Begue; France	36:39.2 (0+0+0+1)	Sean Doherty; United States	336:44.8 (2+1+0+0)	Anton Myhda; Ukraine	37:19.4 (0+1+0+0)
7.5 km sprint details	Fabien Claude; France	21:12.4 (0+2)	Sean Doherty; United States	21:16.0 (1+1)	Rene Zahkna; Estonia	21:27.3 (0+1)
10 km pursuit details	Sean Doherty; United States	29:31.0 (2+0+0+1)	Rene Zahkna; Estonia	29:59.2 (0+1+2+0)	Fredrik Mack Rørvik; Norway	30:03.5 (0+0+1+2)
3 × 7.5 km relay details	Norway; Aslak Nenseter; Fredrik Mack Rørvik; Vemund Gurigard	59:58.5 (0+3) (0+2) (0+0) (0+1) (0+0) (0+1)	Germany; Maximilian Janke; Philipp Horn; Niklas Homberg	1:00:06.8 (0+2) (0+1) (0+2) (0+0) (0+2) (0+0)	France; Aristide Begue; Emilien Personnaz; Fabien Claude	1:01:22.0 (0+1) (0+2) (0+1) (0+1) (0+1) (1+3)

=== Junior Men ===
Event:	Gold:	Time	Silver:	Time	Bronze:	Time
15 km individual details	Alexandr Loginov; Russia	40:24.2 (0+2+0+0)	Dino Butković; Croatia	41:33.1 (0+0+0+1)	Clement Dumont; France	41:38.2 (1+0+0+0)
10 km sprint details	Alexandr Loginov; Russia	25:09.7 (0+1)	Johannes Thingnes Bø; Norway	25:14.6 (1+0)	Maxim Tsvetkov; Russia	25:21.6 (0+2)
12.5 km pursuit details	Johannes Thingnes Bø; Norway	34:58.2 (0+1+2+0)	Maxim Tsvetkov; Russia	35:13.9 (1+0+3+2)	Alexandr Loginov; Russia	35:40.9 (0+0+2+3)
4 × 7.5 km relay details	Norway; Erling Ålvik; Håvard Bogetveit; Vegard Gjermundshaug; Johannes Thingnes Bø	1:18:33.2 (0+0) (0+3) (0+2) (2+3) (0+1) (0+0) (0+0) (0+1)	France; Clement Dumond; Mathieu Legrand; Dany Chavoutier; Quentin Fillon Maillet	1:18:47.2 (0+1) (0+0) (0+2) (0+2) (0+1) (0+0) (0+0) (0+0)	Russia; Timur Makhambetov; Alexandr Loginov; Alexander Chernyshov; Maxim Tsvetkov	1:19:23.2 (0+0) (1+3) (0+2) (1+3) (0+1) (0+0) (0+2) (0+3)

== Medal table ==
* Host nation (Austria)

Rank	Nation	Gold	Silver	Bronze	Total
1	Russia (RUS)	7	2	5	14
2	Germany (GER)	3	2	3	8
3	Norway (NOR)	3	1	1	5
4	France (FRA)	2	1	2	5
5	United States (USA)	1	2	0	3
6	Ukraine (UKR)	0	3	2	5
7	Austria (AUT)*	0	1	1	2
7	Estonia (EST)	0	1	1	2
9	Croatia (CRO)	0	1	0	1
9	Italy (ITA)	0	1	0	1
9	Kazakhstan (KAZ)	0	1	0	1
12	Switzerland (SUI)	0	0	1	1
Totals (12 entries)		16	16	16	48
