= Uliana Nigmatullina =

Russian biathlete

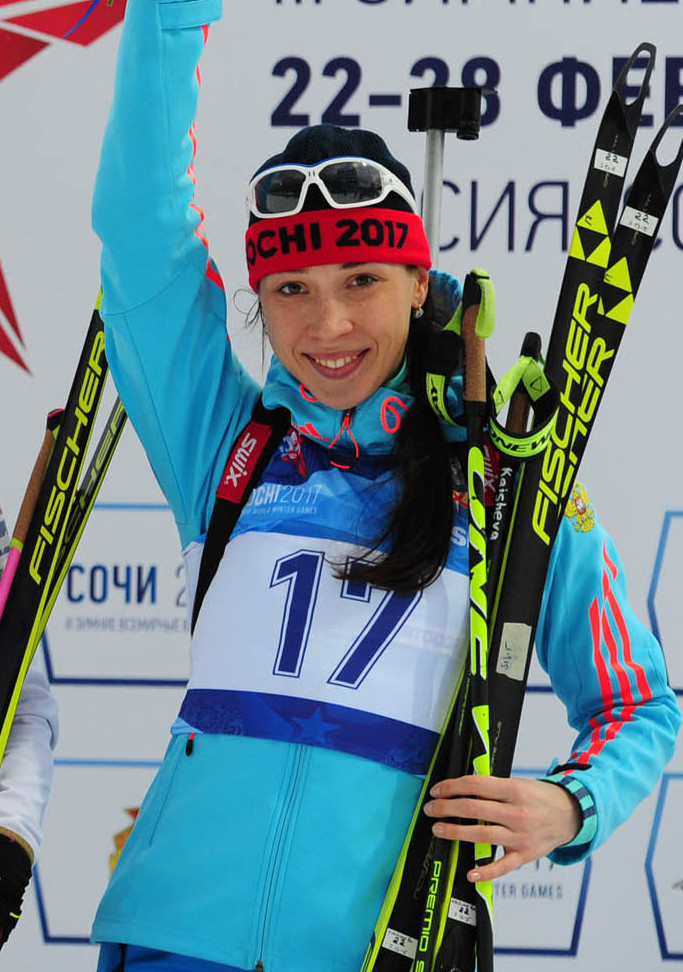
- Nigmatullina in 2017

Personal information
- Native name: Ульяна Николаевна Кайшева
- Nationality: (Russia) Russian
- Born: 8 March 1994 (age 32) Mozhga, Udmurtia, Russia

Sport

Professional information
- World Cup debut: 18 December 2015

Olympic Games
- Teams: 2 (2018, 2022)
- Medals: 2

World Championships
- Teams: 2 (2019, 2021)

World Cup
- Seasons: 5 (2015/16–)
- Individual victories: 0
- All victories: 2
- Individual podiums: 0
- All podiums: 2
Medal record
Women's biathlon
Representing ROC
Olympic Games
Silver medal – second place	2022 Beijing	4 × 6 km relay
Bronze medal – third place	2022 Beijing	Mixed relay
Representing Russia
European Championships
Gold medal – first place	2013 Bansko	7.5 km sprint (U21)
Gold medal – first place	2015 Otepää	Mixed relay (U21)
Silver medal – second place	2014 Nové Město	10 km pursuit (U21)
Silver medal – second place	2014 Nové Město	Mixed relay (U21)
Silver medal – second place	2015 Otepää	10 km pursuit (U21)
Bronze medal – third place	2014 Nové Město	7.5 km sprint (U21)
Bronze medal – third place	2015 Otepää	7.5 km sprint (U21)
Winter Youth Olympics
Gold medal – first place	2012 Innsbruck	7.5 km pursuit
Silver medal – second place	2012 Innsbruck	Cross-country Biathlon mixed relay
Bronze medal – third place	2012 Innsbruck	6 km sprint
Youth World Championships
Gold medal – first place	2013 Obertilliach	6 km sprint
Gold medal – first place	2013 Obertilliach	7.5 km pursuit
Gold medal – first place	2013 Obertilliach	10 km individual
Gold medal – first place	2013 Obertilliach	3 × 6 km relay
Junior World Championships
Silver medal – second place	2014 Presque Isle	3 × 6 km relay
Silver medal – second place	2015 Minsk	3 × 6 km relay
Bronze medal – third place	2014 Presque Isle	12.5 km individual

Uliana Nikolayevna Nigmatullina (née Kaisheva, Russian: Ульяна Николаевна Нигматуллина (Кайшева); born 8 March 1994) is a Russian biathlete. She is the only biathlete to win the four gold medals (individual, sprint, pursuit and relay) at the Youth World Championships, which she accomplished in 2013. She competed in the 2018 Winter Olympics.

== Biathlon results ==
All results are sourced from the International Biathlon Union.

=== Olympic Games ===
2 medals (1 silver, 1 bronze)

Event	Individual	Sprint	Pursuit	Mass start	Relay	Mixed relay
Representing (International Olympic Committee) Olympic Athlete from Russia
(South Korea) 2018 Pyeongchang	24th	33rd	52nd	—	—	9th
Representing ROC Russian Olympic Committee
(China) 2022 Beijing	78th	13th	11th	17th	Silver	Bronze

=== World Championships ===
Event	Individual	Sprint	Pursuit	Mass start	Relay	Mixed relay	Single mixed relay
Representing Russia
(Sweden) 2019 Östersund	60th	—	—	—	5th	—	—
Representing Russian Biathlon Union
(Slovenia) 2021 Pokljuka	24th	36th	29th	—	11th	9th	—
