= Julia Schwaiger =

Austrian biathlete (born 1996)

Julia Leitinger
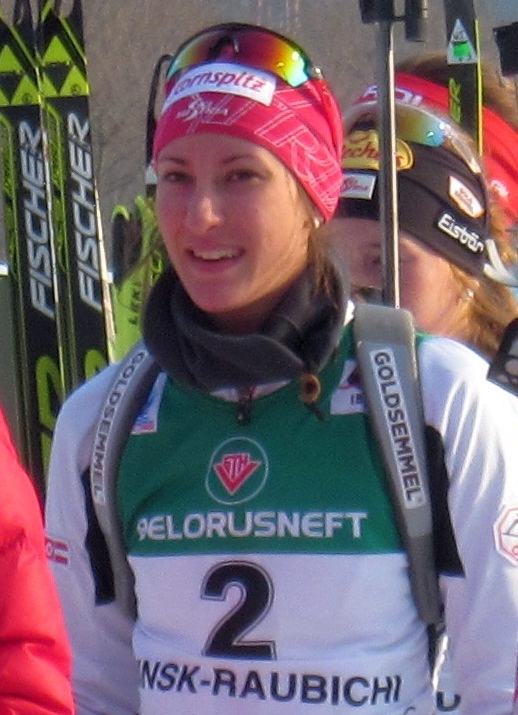
- Julia Schwaiger, 2014

Personal information
- Full name: Julia Christine Leitinger
- Born: Julia Christine Schwaiger; 21 January 1996 (age 30) Zell am See, Austria
- Spouse: Bernhard Leitinger (m. 2024)

Sport
- Country: Austria
- Sport: Biathlon
Medal record
Women's biathlon
Representing Austria
Junior World Championships
Silver medal – second place	2017 Osrblie	12.5 km individual
Bronze medal – third place	2016 Cheile Grădiştei	12.5 km individual
Bronze medal – third place	2016 Cheile Grădiştei	3 × 6 km relay
Youth World Championships
Gold medal – first place	2014 Presque Isle	10 km individual
Silver medal – second place	2015 Raubichi	6 km sprint
Silver medal – second place	2015 Raubichi	7.5 km pursuit
Bronze medal – third place	2014 Presque Isle	3 × 6 km relay

Julia Christine Leitinger (née Schwaiger; born 21 January 1996) is an Austrian biathlete. She represented Austria at the Biathlon World Championships 2015 in Kontiolahti.

Julia works at Omicron electronics in Klaus. She has been married to her former teammate Bernhard Leitinger since September 2024.

== Biathlon results ==
All results are sourced from the International Biathlon Union.

=== Olympic Games ===
0 medals

Event	Individual	Sprint	Pursuit	Mass start	Relay	Mixed relay
(China) 2022 Beijing	31st	45th	44th	—	—	10th

=== World Championships ===
0 medals

Event	Individual	Sprint	Pursuit	Mass start	Relay	Mixed relay	Single mixed relay
(Austria) 2017 Hochfilzen	—	—	—	—	DSQ	—	—
(Sweden) 2019 Östersund	57th	55th	47th	—	16th	—	—
(Italy) 2020 Rasen-Antholz	54th	—	—	—	12th	—	—
(Slovenia) 2021 Pokljuka	10th	63rd	—	—	7th	—	—

*During Olympic seasons competitions are only held for those events not included in the Olympic program.
**The single mixed relay was added as an event in 2019.

=== Junior/Youth World Championships ===
2 medals (1 gold, 1 bronze)

Event	Individual	Sprint	Pursuit	Relay
(Italy) 2002 Ridnaun-Val Ridanna	Gold	35th	17th	9th
(Poland) 2003 Kościelisko	13th	18th	9th	8th
(France) 2004 Haute Maurienne	4th	Bronze	7th	—
