= Anton Myhda =

Ukrainian biathlete (born 1995)

Personal information
- Full name: Anton Myhda
- Born: 22 July 1995 (age 30) Chernihiv, Ukraine

Sport
- Sport: Skiing
Medal record
Men's biathlon
Representing Ukraine
Youth World Championships
Bronze medal – third place	2013 Obertilliach	12.5 km individual
European Youth Olympic Festival
Gold medal – first place	2013 Braşov	Relay
- Updated on January 22, 2013

Anton Myhda (born 22 July 1995) is a Ukrainian biathlete.

== Performances ==
Level	Year	Event	IN	SP	PU	MS	RL	MRL
JBWCH	2013	Obertilliach, Austria	3	48	26		7	
