= Andrii Klymchuk =

Ukrainian ski jumper (born 1994)

Personal information
- Full name: Andrii Klymchuk
- Born: 10 December 1994 (age 31) Kremenets, Ukraine

Sport
- Sport: Skiing
- Updated on February 24, 2013

Andrii Klymchuk (born December 10, 1994) is a Ukrainian ski jumper.

== Performances ==
Level	Year	Event	NH	LH	T	MT
NJWSC	2013	Liberec, Czech Republic	60			
NWSC	2013	Val di Fiemme, Italy	58	59		
