= 2018–19 Biathlon World Cup – Nation Women =

The Nation's Cup Score Women in the 2018–19 Biathlon World Cup was won by Norway, with defending titlist Germany reaching second place. Each nation's score comprises the points earned by its three best placed athletes in every Sprint and Individual competition, the points earned in the Women's Relay competitions, and half of the points earned in the Mixed Relay competitions.

== 2017–18 Top 3 standings ==
Medal	Nation	Points
Gold:	Germany	6179
Silver:	France	5887
Bronze:	Italy	5407

== Standings ==
#	Nation	POK SR	POK MR	POK IN	POK SP	HOC SP	HOC RL	NOV SP	OBE SP	OBE RL	RUH IN	RUH RL	ANT SP	CAN SP	CAN RL	SLC SP	SLC SR	SLC MR	ÖST MR	ÖST SP	ÖST IN	ÖST SR	ÖST RL	OSL SP	Total
1	Norway	210	145	335	321	350	290	385	378	330	366	390	391	429	390	393	155	180	210	402	353	210	420	399	7432
2	Germany	125	135	368	380	385	270	399	313	390	387	360	384	413	420	392	165	195	195	411	375	165	330	415	7372
3	France	165	210	326	402	376	360	373	420	310	412	420	380	377	360	383	180	210	125	308	386	135	250	354	7222
4	Italy	85	180	380	400	425	420	364	411	170	392	210	397	356	330	369	210	110	180	358	368	195	220	278	6808
5	Sweden	155	125	379	327	346	390	347	345	270	401	330	340	181	200	295	135	155	155	382	424	180	390	389	6641
6	Russia	135	165	367	391	403	330	344	356	420	355	310	390	313	—	314	105	—	165	361	357	145	310	372	6408
7	Ukraine	180	115	411	373	286	250	391	320	250	268	170	250	322	190	343	145	95	135	312	387	155	360	292	6000
8	Czech Republic	110	90	366	338	307	230	327	329	360	268	230	356	333	270	352	75	145	145	321	325	115	170	307	5869
9	Switzerland	65	195	268	302	345	200	296	279	220	237	220	262	334	310	336	85	165	105	321	382	90	190	251	5458
10	Austria	195	80	341	305	311	220	297	285	—	293	270	314	350	290	285	195	135	75	249	326	125	160	318	5419
11	Belarus	80	100	311	277	314	310	290	367	230	330	250	301	203	170	253	95	70	95	362	265	80	210	319	5282
12	Slovakia	—	95	373	338	350	180	370	374	290	366	290	333	262	—	140	—	—	100	361	317	40	290	357	5226
13	United States	35	85	283	306	280	190	306	259	200	331	160	306	253	250	308	90	115	65	340	308	95	230	334	5129
14	Poland	90	65	320	307	313	210	311	307	210	340	190	314	231	—	365	115	—	115	288	269	45	270	236	4911
15	Canada	145	110	226	177	207	160	340	227	190	232	200	334	337	150	291	100	105	80	307	270	85	180	246	4699
16	Estonia	75	75	145	209	214	170	201	293	150	264	180	273	321	230	345	125	125	90	271	311	105	200	315	4687
17	Finland	95	155	312	295	305	150	237	199	120	261	150	207	233	—	329	—	—	110	303	248	100	100	286	4195
18	Japan	115	45	200	229	279	140	206	215	110	186	130	228	284	180	299	110	100	85	280	235	75	130	166	4027
19	Bulgaria	70	105	210	222	189	120	145	113	180	209	110	223	202	220	243	70	85	55	205	229	65	120	189	3579
20	China	45	55	139	173	125	130	185	223	160	153	140	192	184	210	61	50	—	70	281	315	50	150	66	3157
21	South Korea	55	50	134	161	215	110	148	179	140	203	100	183	209	160	—	—	—	60	161	216	60	110	113	2767
22	Slovenia	105	—	166	134	167	—	172	164	130	173	120	199	193	—	214	80	90	35	136	153	30	90	183	2734
23	Kazakhstan	50	70	153	189	209	—	196	176	—	111	—	223	145	—	227	65	75	50	171	210	70	140	187	2717
24	Lithuania	40	60	133	140	103	100	127	69	—	37	—	123	136	—	129	55	80	40	161	175	35	—	137	1880
25	Latvia	100	—	140	113	90	—	116	98	—	101	—	78	103	—	76	—	—	45	159	89	110	—	116	1534
26	Moldova	60	—	35	19	64	—	94	86	—	—	—	49	—	—	—	—	—	—	53	—	55	—	39	554
27	Romania	—	—	—	—	—	—	—	21	—	19	—	—	—	—	62	60	—	30	67	41	25	—	—	325
28	Croatia	—	—	—	—	—	—	—	—	—	—	—	—	—	—	—	—	—	—	102	102	—	—	—	204
29	Belgium	—	—	—	—	—	—	—	—	—	—	—	—	—	—	—	—	—	—	39	37	20	—	—	96
30	Australia	—	—	—	—	—	—	—	—	—	—	—	—	—	—	—	—	—	—	41	47	—	—	—	88
31	Spain	—	—	—	37	—	—	—	27	—	—	—	—	—	—	—	—	—	—	—	—	—	—	—	64
32	Greece	—	—	—	—	—	—	—	—	—	—	—	—	—	—	—	—	—	—	—	35	—	—	—	35
