= 2018–19 Biathlon World Cup – Pursuit Men =

The 2018–19 Biathlon World Cup – Pursuit Men started on Sunday 9 December 2018 in Pokljuka and finished on Saturday 23 March 2019 in Oslo Holmenkollen. The defending titlist was Martin Fourcade of France.

The small crystal globe winner for the category was Johannes Thingnes Bø of Norway.

== Competition format ==
The 12.5 kilometres (7.8 mi) pursuit race is skied over five laps. The biathlete shoots four times at any shooting lane, in the order of prone, prone, standing, standing, totalling 20 targets. For each missed target a biathlete has to run a 150 metres (490 ft) penalty loop. Competitors' starts are staggered, according to the result of the previous sprint race.

== 2017–18 Top 3 standings ==
Medal	Athlete	Points
Gold:	(France) Martin Fourcade	222
Silver:	(Norway) Johannes Thingnes Bø	202
Bronze:	(Slovenia) Jakov Fak	166

== Medal winners ==
Event	Gold	Time	Silver	Time	Bronze	Time
Pokljuka details	Johannes Thingnes Bø; Norway	30:20.4 (1+0+0+2)	Quentin Fillon Maillet; France	30:20.5 (0+0+0+0)	Alexandr Loginov; Russia	30:22.3 (0+0+1+0)
Hochfilzen details	Martin Fourcade; France	32:22.3 (0+0+0+0)	Arnd Peiffer; Germany	32:36.0 (1+0+0+0)	Vetle Sjåstad Christiansen; Norway	32:38.4 (0+0+0+0)
Nové Město details	Johannes Thingnes Bø; Norway	31:59.0 (1+0+2+1)	Alexandr Loginov; Russia	32:05.2 (1+1+1+1)	Tarjei Bø; Norway	32:22.9 (0+0+0+1)
Oberhof details	Johannes Thingnes Bø; Norway	34:29.8 (0+1+1+1)	Arnd Peiffer; Germany	34:44.9 (1+0+0+0)	Lukas Hofer; Italy	34:45.6 (0+0+0+0)
Antholz-Anterselva details	Johannes Thingnes Bø; Norway	31:33.7 (1+1+0+1)	Antonin Guigonnat; France	32:08.5 (0+0+1+0)	Quentin Fillon Maillet; France	32:14.3 (1+0+0+1)
Soldier Hollow, Utah details	Quentin Fillon Maillet; France	30:55.8 (0+0+0+0)	Vetle Sjåstad Christiansen; Norway	31:21.7 (0+1+0+0)	Simon Desthieux; France	31:43.1 (0+1+1+1)
World Championships details	Dmytro Pidruchnyi; Ukraine	31:54.1 (2+0+0+0)	Johannes Thingnes Bø; Norway	32:02.4 (0+1+1+3)	Quentin Fillon Maillet; France	32:11.8 (2+0+0+1)
Oslo Holmenkollen details	Johannes Thingnes Bø; Norway	32:15.6 (0+2+0+1)	Tarjei Bø; Norway	32:29.5 (0+0+0+1)	Arnd Peiffer; Germany	32:33.8 (0+0+1+0)

== Standings ==
#	Name	POK	HOC	NOV	OBE	ANT	SOL	ÖST	OSL	Total
1	Johannes Thingnes Bø (NOR)	60	32	60	60	60	43	54	60	429
2	Quentin Fillon Maillet (FRA)	54	21	36	19	48	60	48	29	315
3	Alexandr Loginov (RUS)	48	36	54	40	36	36	27	28	305
4	Simon Desthieux (FRA)	26	30	43	38	43	48	9	34	271
5	Tarjei Bø (NOR)	38	29	48	28	26	—	43	54	266
6	Arnd Peiffer (GER)	16	54	25	54	38	—	28	48	263
7	Antonin Guigonnat (FRA)	31	25	26	30	54	24	36	27	253
8	Lukas Hofer (ITA)	34	40	24	48	32	29	0	38	245
9	Simon Eder (AUT)	43	27	34	32	34	28	31	12	241
10	Martin Fourcade (FRA)	DNF	60	40	43	40	—	40	—	223
11	Julian Eberhard (AUT)	40	43	16	34	27	14	22	25	221
12	Benjamin Weger (SUI)	32	38	19	29	28	38	34	—	218
13	Vetle Sjåstad Christiansen (NOR)	—	48	21	9	12	54	18	40	202
14	Benedikt Doll (GER)	23	24	22	36	0	32	29	36	202
15	Dmytro Pidruchnyi (UKR)	1	15	38	20	9	27	60	11	181
16	Erlend Bjøntegaard (NOR)	29	—	32	16	24	18	26	23	168
17	Henrik L'Abée-Lund (NOR)	36	4	18	27	19	21	—	31	156
18	Evgeniy Garanichev (RUS)	17	2	28	31	21	DNS	32	24	155
19	Felix Leitner (AUT)	20	11	—	22	0	20	19	43	135
20	Sean Doherty (USA)	2	10	14	23	0	31	21	30	131
21	Dominik Windisch (ITA)	21	23	—	0	30	17	24	14	129
22	Emilien Jacquelin (FRA)	25	14	0	26	25	11	12	15	128
23	Erik Lesser (GER)	0	18	—	DNS	20	40	30	17	125
24	Andrejs Rastorgujevs (LAT)	9	DNS	—	15	18	22	38	20	122
25	Matvey Eliseev (RUS)	12	12	30	12	0	—	6	32	104
26	Michal Krčmář (CZE)	24	17	9	0	29	6	16	0	101
27	Jakov Fak (SLO)	19	28	17	—	—	—	15	22	101
28	Sebastian Samuelsson (SWE)	22	6	31	2	—	—	25	13	99
29	Ondřej Moravec (CZE)	18	13	23	24	DNS	—	—	21	99
30	Christian Gow (CAN)	27	—	20	14	—	34	—	—	95
#	Name	POK	HOC	NOV	OBE	ANT	SOL	ÖST	OSL	Total
31	Johannes Kühn (GER)	0	16	11	10	13	8	17	9	84
32	Thomas Bormolini (ITA)	14	—	—	—	22	13	14	10	73
33	Simon Fourcade (FRA)	—	—	—	25	17	26	—	—	68
34	Dmitry Malyshko (RUS)	—	0	12	21	14	—	11	7	65
35	Jesper Nelin (SWE)	10	—	29	4	11	—	8	0	62
36	Artem Pryma (UKR)	30	0	7	DNF	15	—	—	0	52
37	Klemen Bauer (SLO)	—	20	—	8	0	—	5	19	52
38	Lars Helge Birkeland (NOR)	6	—	—	13	31	—	—	0	50
39	Simon Schempp (GER)	15	34	0	—	—	—	—	—	49
40	Florent Claude (BEL)	5	31	1	0	4	7	—	—	48
41	Tomáš Krupčík (CZE)	0	—	—	—	23	—	23	2	48
42	Dominik Landertinger (AUT)	DNS	22	—	18	—	—	7	DNS	47
43	Johannes Dale (NOR)	—	—	13	—	—	30	—	—	43
44	Philipp Nawrath (GER)	—	—	—	—	0	19	20	4	43
45	Jeremy Finello (SUI)	—	26	—	—	—	5	10	0	41
46	Fabien Claude (FRA)	—	—	—	—	—	25	—	16	41
47	Krasimir Anev (BUL)	0	19	15	5	DNF	—	2	DNS	41
48	Martin Ponsiluoma (SWE)	7	0	27	—	DNS	—	—	5	39
49	Vladimir Iliev (BUL)	0	3	5	—	16	10	4	—	38
50	Sindre Pettersen (NOR)	28	—	—	—	—	—	—	—	28
51	Roman Rees (GER)	—	—	4	—	DNS	23	—	—	27
52	Lucas Fratzscher (GER)	—	—	—	—	—	—	—	26	26
53	Raman Yaliotnau (BLR)	—	0	0	11	10	—	—	3	24
54	Philipp Horn (GER)	13	8	—	—	—	—	—	0	21
55	Martin Jäger (SUI)	—	—	—	0	5	15	0	—	20
56	Tero Seppala (FIN)	—	0	0	0	0	—	13	6	19
57	Olli Hiidensalo (FIN)	—	0	—	DNS	—	—	0	18	18
58	Maxim Tsvetkov (RUS)	—	—	—	17	—	—	—	—	17
59	Scott Gow (CAN)	—	0	0	—	0	16	0	—	16
60	Martin Otčenáš (SVK)	0	9	—	7	—	—	0	—	16
#	Name	POK	HOC	NOV	OBE	ANT	SOL	ÖST	OSL	Total
61	Kalev Ermits (EST)	—	—	8	0	—	—	—	8	16
62	Alexander Povarnitsyn (RUS)	—	—	—	—	6	9	—	—	15
63	Rene Zahkna (EST)	—	—	—	—	2	12	—	—	14
64	Serhiy Semenov (UKR)	3	—	10	0	—	—	—	—	13
65	Serafin Wiestner (SUI)	11	DNS	—	—	—	0	0	—	11
66	Torstein Stenersen (SWE)	—	—	2	—	7	—	—	—	9
67	Leif Nordgren (USA)	8	0	0	—	—	—	0	0	8
68	Tomáš Hasilla (SVK)	0	—	—	—	8	—	0	—	8
69	Tuomas Grönman (FIN)	0	7	DNF	—	—	—	1	0	8
70	Sergey Bocharnikov (BLR)	—	—	—	6	—	—	—	1	7
71	Jules Burnotte (CAN)	—	—	6	—	0	—	—	—	6
72	Mario Dolder (SUI)	—	0	—	0	3	3	—	—	6
73	Roman Yeremin (KAZ)	0	5	0	—	0	0	DNS	0	5
74	Thierry Chenal (ITA)	4	—	0	—	—	0	—	—	4
75	Cornel Puchianu (ROU)	—	—	0	0	—	4	—	—	4
76	Vladimir Chepelin (BLR)	—	—	—	3	1	—	0	0	4
77	Miha Dovzan (SLO)	0	—	3	—	—	0	—	—	3
78	Ruslan Tkalenko (UKR)	—	—	—	—	—	—	3	—	3
79	Aidan Millar (CAN)	—	—	—	—	—	2	—	—	2
80	Matej Kazár (SVK)	0	—	0	1	—	—	0	—	1
81	Timofey Lapshin (KOR)	DNF	1	—	—	—	—	—	—	1
81	Peppe Femling (SWE)	—	—	—	—	—	1	—	—	1
