= 2018–19 Biathlon World Cup – Nation Men =

== 2017–18 Top 3 standings ==
Medal	Nation	Points
Gold:	Norway	6458
Silver:	France	6129
Bronze:	Germany	5910

== Standings ==
#	Nation	POK SR	POK MR	POK IN	POK SP	HOC SP	HOC RL	NOV SP	OBE SP	OBE RL	RUH SP	RUH RL	ANT SP	CAN IN	CAN RL	SOL SP	SOL SR	SOL MR	ÖST MR	ÖST SP	ÖST IN	ÖST SR	ÖST RL	OSL SP	Total
1	Norway	210	145	397	441	404	390	426	411	270	443	420	440	457	420	431	155	180	210	424	414	210	420	429	8147
2	France	165	210	413	420	433	230	405	385	390	401	360	429	382	390	424	180	210	125	426	389	135	290	406	7598
3	Germany	125	135	412	352	412	360	373	407	250	403	390	363	386	330	420	165	195	195	396	421	165	390	402	7447
4	Russia	135	165	362	381	347	310	404	407	420	376	310	346	401	360	356	105	135	165	384	368	145	360	368	7110
5	Austria	195	80	380	381	390	330	346	397	360	381	330	386	375	310	319	195	125	75	371	304	125	250	374	6779
6	Italy	85	180	283	349	322	290	316	329	290	343	230	362	379	250	377	210	105	180	301	350	195	170	385	6281
7	Sweden	155	125	383	334	294	420	347	291	310	340	290	286	289	190	239	135	155	155	287	350	180	270	360	6185
8	Czech Republic	110	90	337	346	300	270	332	313	330	323	250	355	298	290	311	75	145	145	284	343	115	330	327	6019
9	Switzerland	65	195	297	309	365	250	244	298	220	299	210	338	305	170	350	85	165	105	336	282	90	210	225	5413
10	Ukraine	180	115	368	315	265	160	335	313	100	305	270	324	295	270	258	145	90	135	301	230	155	200	262	5391
11	Bulgaria	70	105	276	308	317	220	300	280	80	282	200	308	264	100	283	70	80	55	301	388	65	230	255	4837
12	Belarus	80	100	262	240	203	150	255	347	190	305	220	254	149	200	242	95	65	95	241	326	80	220	296	4615
13	Slovenia	105	—	298	277	316	210	283	283	230	235	170	203	214	—	295	80	85	35	327	280	30	310	293	4559
14	Canada	145	110	273	228	238	120	332	186	140	258	160	294	316	220	342	100	100	80	236	150	85	190	137	4440
15	United States	35	85	200	240	223	200	276	230	130	303	150	266	282	150	237	90	110	65	309	322	95	130	291	4419
16	Estonia	75	75	125	156	168	130	192	222	180	195	140	256	295	210	266	125	115	90	208	276	105	180	198	3982
17	Slovakia	—	95	174	266	262	170	204	281	210	216	190	261	257	230	—	—	—	100	281	235	40	140	216	3828
18	Poland	90	65	283	173	255	140	189	214	200	175	120	165	264	160	232	115	—	115	212	246	45	160	159	3777
19	Finland	95	155	241	163	284	180	261	249	160	195	180	100	—	—	—	—	—	110	326	252	100	150	282	3483
20	Lithuania	40	60	251	207	195	70	173	140	120	147	80	202	97	—	231	55	75	40	279	248	35	110	150	3005
21	Japan	115	45	186	103	74	110	169	82	170	189	70	103	112	110	126	110	95	85	256	205	75	120	82	2792
22	Latvia	100	—	91	149	187	—	71	185	50	200	50	208	223	130	234	—	—	45	213	246	110	80	168	2740
23	Kazakhstan	50	70	147	199	157	100	223	128	70	125	110	185	116	—	233	65	70	50	182	194	70	70	112	2726
24	Romania	—	—	176	95	89	80	194	172	150	120	90	153	227	140	253	60	—	30	200	213	25	100	146	2713
25	Belgium	—	—	166	161	214	190	105	176	110	156	130	149	191	180	167	—	—	—	113	154	20	90	104	2576
26	South Korea	55	50	116	91	120	90	36	38	60	40	60	47	134	120	—	—	—	60	112	198	60	60	24	1571
27	China	45	55	31	13	19	—	17	109	90	50	100	52	162	90	111	50	—	70	54	128	50	—	3	1299
28	Moldova	60	—	79	57	62	—	51	41	—	31	—	51	—	—	—	—	—	—	77	65	55	—	15	644
29	Serbia	—	—	—	—	—	—	—	39	—	13	—	62	49	—	69	—	—	—	55	70	—	—	—	357
30	Greece	—	—	3	1	33	—	27	21	—	3	—	21	—	—	—	—	—	—	41	51	—	—	9	210
#	Nation	POK SR	POK MR	POK IN	POK SP	HOC SP	HOC RL	NOV SP	OBE SP	OBE RL	RUH SP	RUH RL	ANT SP	CAN IN	CAN RL	SOL SP	SOL SR	SOL MR	ÖST MR	ÖST SP	ÖST IN	ÖST SR	ÖST RL	OSL SP	Total
31	Croatia	—	—	19	25	65	—	71	—	—	—	—	—	—	—	—	—	—	—	—	—	—	—	—	180
32	Hungary	—	—	—	—	—	—	—	—	—	—	—	—	—	—	—	—	—	—	32	58	—	—	—	90
33	Spain	—	—	—	—	—	—	—	—	—	—	—	—	—	—	—	—	—	—	19	27	—	—	—	46
34	North Macedonia	—	—	—	—	—	—	—	—	—	—	—	—	—	—	—	—	—	—	27	—	—	—	—	27
