= 2018–19 Biathlon World Cup =

Biathlon competition

Discipline	Men	Women
Overall	(Norway) Johannes Thingnes Bø	(Italy) Dorothea Wierer
Nations Cup	Norway	Norway
Individual	(Norway) Johannes Thingnes Bø	(Italy) Lisa Vittozzi
Sprint	(Norway) Johannes Thingnes Bø	(Slovakia) Anastasiya Kuzmina
Pursuit	(Norway) Johannes Thingnes Bø	(Italy) Dorothea Wierer
Mass start	(Norway) Johannes Thingnes Bø	(Sweden) Hanna Öberg
Relay	Norway	Norway
- Mixed: Norway

Competition

The 2018–19 Biathlon World Cup (BWC) was a multi-race series over a season of biathlon, organised by the International Biathlon Union. The season started on 2 December 2018 in Pokljuka, Slovenia and ended on 24 March 2019 in Oslo Holmenkollen, Norway. The defending overall champions from the 2017–18 Biathlon World Cup were Martin Fourcade of France and Kaisa Mäkäräinen of Finland.

== Calendar ==
Below is the IBU World Cup calendar for the 2018–19 season.

Stage	Location	Date	Individual	Sprint	Pursuit	Mass start	Relay	Mixed relay	Single mixed relay	Details
1	(Slovenia) Pokljuka	2–9 December	●	●	●			●	●	details
2	(Austria) Hochfilzen	13–16 December		●	●		●			details
3	(Czech Republic) Nové Město	20–23 December		●	●	●				details
4	(Germany) Oberhof	10–13 January		●	●		●			details
5	(Germany) Ruhpolding	17–20 January		●		●	●			details
6	(Italy) Antholz-Anterselva	24–27 January		●	●	●				details
7	(Canada) Canmore	7–10 February	● (Note: The Individuals in Canmore were shortened because of freezing temperatures.)				●			details
8	(United States) Salt Lake City	14–17 February		●	●			●	●	details
WC	(Sweden) Östersund	7–17 March	●	●	●	●	●	●	●	World Championships
9	(Norway) Oslo Holmenkollen	21–24 March		●	●	●				details
Total: 68 (31 men's, 31 women's, 6 mixed)			3	9	8	5	5	3	3	

== World Cup podiums ==
=== Men ===
Stage	Date	Place	Discipline	Winner	Second	Third	Yellow bib (After competition)	Det.
1	6 December 2018	(Slovenia) Pokljuka	20 km Individual	(France) Martin Fourcade	(Germany) Johannes Kühn	(Austria) Simon Eder	(France) Martin Fourcade	Detail
1	7 December 2018	(Slovenia) Pokljuka	10 km Sprint	(Norway) Johannes Thingnes Bø	(France) Antonin Guigonnat	(Russia) Alexandr Loginov	(Norway) Johannes Thingnes Bø	Detail
1	9 December 2018	(Slovenia) Pokljuka	12.5 km Pursuit	(Norway) Johannes Thingnes Bø	(France) Quentin Fillon Maillet	(Russia) Alexandr Loginov	(Norway) Johannes Thingnes Bø	Detail
2	14 December 2018	(Austria) Hochfilzen	10 km Sprint	(Norway) Johannes Thingnes Bø	(France) Martin Fourcade	(Germany) Benedikt Doll	(Norway) Johannes Thingnes Bø	Detail
2	15 December 2018	(Austria) Hochfilzen	12.5 km Pursuit	(France) Martin Fourcade	(Germany) Arnd Peiffer	(Norway) Vetle Sjåstad Christiansen	(Norway) Johannes Thingnes Bø	Detail
3	20 December 2018	(Czech Republic) Nové Město na M.	10 km Sprint	(Norway) Johannes Thingnes Bø	(Russia) Alexandr Loginov	(Sweden) Martin Ponsiluoma	(Norway) Johannes Thingnes Bø	Detail
3	22 December 2018	(Czech Republic) Nové Město na M.	12.5 km Pursuit	(Norway) Johannes Thingnes Bø	(Russia) Alexandr Loginov	(Norway) Tarjei Bø	(Norway) Johannes Thingnes Bø	Detail
3	23 December 2018	(Czech Republic) Nové Město na M.	15 km Mass Start	(Norway) Johannes Thingnes Bø	(France) Quentin Fillon Maillet	(Russia) Evgeny Garanichev	(Norway) Johannes Thingnes Bø	Detail
4	11 January 2019	(Germany) Oberhof	10 km Sprint	(Russia) Alexandr Loginov	(Norway) Johannes Thingnes Bø	(Sweden) Sebastian Samuelsson	(Norway) Johannes Thingnes Bø	Detail
4	12 January 2019	(Germany) Oberhof	12.5 km Pursuit	(Norway) Johannes Thingnes Bø	(Germany) Arnd Peiffer	(Italy) Lukas Hofer	(Norway) Johannes Thingnes Bø	Detail
5	17 January 2019	(Germany) Ruhpolding	10 km Sprint	(Norway) Johannes Thingnes Bø	(Norway) Tarjei Bø	(Germany) Benedikt Doll	(Norway) Johannes Thingnes Bø	Detail
5	20 January 2019	(Germany) Ruhpolding	15 km Mass Start	(Norway) Johannes Thingnes Bø	(Austria) Julian Eberhard	(France) Quentin Fillon Maillet	(Norway) Johannes Thingnes Bø	Detail
6	25 January 2019	(Italy) Antholz-Anterselva	10 km Sprint	(Norway) Johannes Thingnes Bø	(Norway) Erlend Bjøntegaard	(France) Antonin Guigonnat	(Norway) Johannes Thingnes Bø	Detail
6	26 January 2019	(Italy) Antholz-Anterselva	12.5 km Pursuit	(Norway) Johannes Thingnes Bø	(France) Antonin Guigonnat	(France) Quentin Fillon Maillet	(Norway) Johannes Thingnes Bø	Detail
6	27 January 2019	(Italy) Antholz-Anterselva	15 km Mass Start	(France) Quentin Fillon Maillet	(Norway) Johannes Thingnes Bø	(Germany) Arnd Peiffer	(Norway) Johannes Thingnes Bø	Detail
7	7 February 2019	(Canada) Canmore	15 km Short Individual	(Norway) Johannes Thingnes Bø	(Norway) Vetle Sjåstad Christiansen	(Russia) Alexandr Loginov	(Norway) Johannes Thingnes Bø	Detail
7	10 February 2019	(Canada) Canmore	15 km Mass Start	Cancelled due to freezing temperatures			(Norway) Johannes Thingnes Bø	Detail
8	15 February 2019	(United States) Soldier Hollow	10 km Sprint	(Norway) Vetle Sjåstad Christiansen	(France) Simon Desthieux	(Germany) Roman Rees	(Norway) Johannes Thingnes Bø	Detail
8	16 February 2019	(United States) Soldier Hollow	12.5 km Pursuit	(France) Quentin Fillon Maillet	(Norway) Vetle Sjåstad Christiansen	(France) Simon Desthieux	(Norway) Johannes Thingnes Bø	Detail
WC	9 March 2019	(Sweden) Östersund	10 km Sprint	(Norway) Johannes Thingnes Bø	(Russia) Alexandr Loginov	(France) Quentin Fillon Maillet	(Norway) Johannes Thingnes Bø	Detail
WC	10 March 2019	(Sweden) Östersund	12.5 km Pursuit	(Ukraine) Dmytro Pidruchnyi	(Norway) Johannes Thingnes Bø	(France) Quentin Fillon Maillet	(Norway) Johannes Thingnes Bø	Detail
WC	13 March 2019	(Sweden) Östersund	20 km Individual	(Germany) Arnd Peiffer	(Bulgaria) Vladimir Iliev	(Norway) Tarjei Bø	(Norway) Johannes Thingnes Bø	Detail
WC	17 March 2019	(Sweden) Östersund	15 km Mass Start	(Italy) Dominik Windisch	(France) Antonin Guigonnat	(Austria) Julian Eberhard	(Norway) Johannes Thingnes Bø	Detail
9	22 March 2019	(Norway) Oslo Holmenkollen	10 km Sprint	(Norway) Johannes Thingnes Bø	(Italy) Lukas Hofer	(France) Quentin Fillon Maillet	(Norway) Johannes Thingnes Bø	Detail
9	23 March 2019	(Norway) Oslo Holmenkollen	12.5 km Pursuit	(Norway) Johannes Thingnes Bø	(Norway) Tarjei Bø	(Germany) Arnd Peiffer	(Norway) Johannes Thingnes Bø	Detail
9	24 March 2019	(Norway) Oslo Holmenkollen	15 km Mass Start	(Norway) Johannes Thingnes Bø	(Germany) Arnd Peiffer	(Germany) Benedikt Doll	(Norway) Johannes Thingnes Bø	Detail

=== Women ===
Stage	Date	Place	Discipline	Winner	Second	Third	Yellow bib (After competition)	Det.
1	6 December 2018	(Slovenia) Pokljuka	15 km Individual	(Ukraine) Yuliia Dzhima	(Poland) Monika Hojnisz	(Czech Republic) Markéta Davidová	(Ukraine) Yuliia Dzhima	Detail
1	8 December 2018	(Slovenia) Pokljuka	7.5 km Sprint	(Finland) Kaisa Mäkäräinen	(Italy) Dorothea Wierer	(France) Justine Braisaz	(Italy) Dorothea Wierer	Detail
1	9 December 2018	(Slovenia) Pokljuka	10 km Pursuit	(Finland) Kaisa Mäkäräinen	(Italy) Dorothea Wierer	(Slovakia) Paulína Fialková	(Italy) Dorothea Wierer	Detail
2	13 December 2018	(Austria) Hochfilzen	7.5 km Sprint	(Italy) Dorothea Wierer	(Finland) Kaisa Mäkäräinen	(Russia) Ekaterina Yurlova-Percht	(Italy) Dorothea Wierer	Detail
2	15 December 2018	(Austria) Hochfilzen	10 km Pursuit	(Finland) Kaisa Mäkäräinen	(Slovakia) Paulína Fialková	(Italy) Dorothea Wierer	(Italy) Dorothea Wierer	Detail
3	21 December 2018	(Czech Republic) Nové Město na M.	7.5 km Sprint	(Norway) Marte Olsbu Røiseland	(Germany) Laura Dahlmeier	(Slovakia) Paulína Fialková	(Italy) Dorothea Wierer	Detail
3	22 December 2018	(Czech Republic) Nové Město na M.	10 km Pursuit	(Norway) Marte Olsbu Røiseland	(Italy) Dorothea Wierer	(Sweden) Hanna Öberg	(Italy) Dorothea Wierer	Detail
3	23 December 2018	(Czech Republic) Nové Město na M.	12.5 km Mass Start	(Slovakia) Anastázia Kuzminová	(Slovakia) Paulína Fialková	(France) Anaïs Chevalier	(Italy) Dorothea Wierer	Detail
4	10 January 2019	(Germany) Oberhof	7.5 km Sprint	(Italy) Lisa Vittozzi	(France) Anaïs Chevalier	(Sweden) Hanna Öberg	(Italy) Dorothea Wierer	Detail
4	12 January 2019	(Germany) Oberhof	10 km Pursuit	(Italy) Lisa Vittozzi	(Slovakia) Anastázia Kuzminová	(France) Anaïs Chevalier	(Italy) Dorothea Wierer	Detail
5	17 January 2019	(Germany) Ruhpolding	7.5 km Sprint	(Slovakia) Anastázia Kuzminová	(Italy) Lisa Vittozzi	(Sweden) Hanna Öberg	(Italy) Dorothea Wierer	Detail
5	20 January 2019	(Germany) Ruhpolding	12.5 km Mass Start	(Germany) Franziska Preuß	(Norway) Ingrid Landmark Tandrevold	(Slovakia) Paulína Fialková	(Italy) Dorothea Wierer	Detail
6	24 January 2019	(Italy) Antholz-Anterselva	7.5 km Sprint	(Czech Republic) Markéta Davidová	(Finland) Kaisa Mäkäräinen	(Norway) Marte Olsbu Røiseland	(Italy) Dorothea Wierer	Detail
6	26 January 2019	(Italy) Antholz-Anterselva	10 km Pursuit	(Italy) Dorothea Wierer	(Germany) Laura Dahlmeier	(Italy) Lisa Vittozzi	(Italy) Dorothea Wierer	Detail
6	27 January 2019	(Italy) Antholz-Anterselva	12.5 km Mass Start	(Germany) Laura Dahlmeier	(Czech Republic) Markéta Davidová	(Germany) Vanessa Hinz	(Italy) Dorothea Wierer	Detail
7	7 February 2019	(Canada) Canmore	12.5 km Short Individual	(Norway) Tiril Eckhoff	(Czech Republic) Markéta Davidová	(Italy) Lisa Vittozzi	(Italy) Dorothea Wierer	Detail
7	10 February 2019	(Canada) Canmore	12.5 km Mass Start	Cancelled due to freezing temperatures			(Italy) Dorothea Wierer	Detail
8	14 February 2019	(United States) Soldier Hollow	7.5 km Sprint	(Norway) Marte Olsbu Røiseland	(Finland) Kaisa Mäkäräinen	(Germany) Franziska Hildebrand	(Italy) Dorothea Wierer	Detail
8	16 February 2019	(United States) Soldier Hollow	10 km Pursuit	(Germany) Denise Herrmann	(Germany) Franziska Hildebrand	(Finland) Kaisa Mäkäräinen	(Italy) Lisa Vittozzi	Detail
WC	8 March 2019	(Sweden) Östersund	7.5 km Sprint	(Slovakia) Anastázia Kuzminová	(Norway) Ingrid Landmark Tandrevold	(Germany) Laura Dahlmeier	(Italy) Dorothea Wierer	Detail
WC	10 March 2019	(Sweden) Östersund	10 km Pursuit	(Germany) Denise Herrmann	(Norway) Tiril Eckhoff	(Germany) Laura Dahlmeier	(Italy) Lisa Vittozzi	Detail
WC	12 March 2019	(Sweden) Östersund	15 km Individual	(Sweden) Hanna Öberg	(Italy) Lisa Vittozzi	(France) Justine Braisaz	(Italy) Lisa Vittozzi	Detail
WC	17 March 2019	(Sweden) Östersund	12.5 km Mass Start	(Italy) Dorothea Wierer	(Russia) Ekaterina Yurlova-Percht	(Germany) Denise Herrmann	(Italy) Dorothea Wierer	Detail
9	21 March 2019	(Norway) Oslo Holmenkollen	7.5 km Sprint	(Slovakia) Anastázia Kuzminová	(Germany) Franziska Preuß	(Slovakia) Paulína Fialková	(Italy) Dorothea Wierer	Detail
9	23 March 2019	(Norway) Oslo Holmenkollen	10 km Pursuit	(Slovakia) Anastázia Kuzminová	(Germany) Denise Herrmann	(Sweden) Hanna Öberg	(Italy) Dorothea Wierer	Detail
9	24 March 2019	(Norway) Oslo Holmenkollen	12.5 km Mass Start	(Sweden) Hanna Öberg	(Norway) Tiril Eckhoff	(United States) Clare Egan	(Italy) Dorothea Wierer	Detail

=== Men's team ===
Stage	Date	Place	Discipline	Winner	Second	Third	Det.
2	16 December 2018	(Austria) Hochfilzen	4x7.5 km Relay	Sweden Peppe Femling; Martin Ponsiluoma; Torstein Stenersen; Sebastian Samuelsson	Norway Lars Helge Birkeland; Henrik L'Abée-Lund; Tarjei Bø; Vetle Sjåstad Christiansen	Germany Simon Schempp; Johannes Kühn; Arnd Peiffer; Benedikt Doll	Detail
4	13 January 2019	(Germany) Oberhof	4x7.5 km Relay	Russia Maxim Tsvetkov; Evgeniy Garanichev; Dmitry Malyshko; Alexandr Loginov	France Antonin Guigonnat; Simon Desthieux; Quentin Fillon Maillet; Martin Fourcade	Austria Tobias Eberhard; Simon Eder; Dominik Landertinger; Julian Eberhard	Detail
5	18 January 2019	(Germany) Ruhpolding	4x7.5 km Relay	Norway Lars Helge Birkeland; Vetle Sjåstad Christiansen; Tarjei Bø; Johannes Thingnes Bø	Germany Roman Rees; Johannes Kühn; Arnd Peiffer; Benedikt Doll	France Émilien Jacquelin; Martin Fourcade; Quentin Fillon Maillet; Simon Desthieux	Detail
7	8 February 2019	(Canada) Canmore	4x7.5 km Relay	Norway Lars Helge Birkeland; Vetle Sjåstad Christiansen; Erlend Bjøntegaard; Johannes Thingnes Bø	France Antonin Guigonnat; Émilien Jacquelin; Simon Fourcade; Quentin Fillon Maillet	Russia Evgeniy Garanichev; Eduard Latypov; Alexandr Loginov; Alexander Povarnitsyn	Detail
WC	16 March 2019	(Sweden) Östersund	4x7.5 km Relay	Norway Lars Helge Birkeland; Vetle Sjåstad Christiansen; Tarjei Bø; Johannes Thingnes Bø	Germany Erik Lesser; Roman Rees; Arnd Peiffer; Benedikt Doll	Russia Matvey Eliseev; Nikita Porshnev; Dmitry Malyshko; Alexandr Loginov	Detail

=== Women's team ===
Stage	Date	Place	Discipline	Winner	Second	Third	Det.
2	16 December 2018	(Austria) Hochfilzen	4x6 km Relay	Italy Lisa Vittozzi; Alexia Runggaldier; Dorothea Wierer; Federica Sanfilippo	Sweden Linn Persson; Mona Brorsson; Emma Nilsson; Hanna Öberg	France Anaïs Chevalier; Julia Simon; Célia Aymonier; Anaïs Bescond	Detail
4	13 January 2019	(Germany) Oberhof	4x6 km Relay	Russia Evgeniya Pavlova; Margarita Vasileva; Larisa Kuklina; Ekaterina Yurlova-Percht	Germany Karolin Horchler; Franziska Hildebrand; Franziska Preuß; Denise Herrmann	Czech Republic Lucie Charvátová; Veronika Vítková; Markéta Davidová; Eva Puskarčíková	Detail
5	19 January 2019	(Germany) Ruhpolding	4x6 km Relay	France Julia Simon; Anaïs Bescond; Justine Braisaz; Anaïs Chevalier	Norway Synnøve Solemdal; Ingrid Landmark Tandrevold; Tiril Eckhoff; Marte Olsbu Røiseland	Germany Vanessa Hinz; Laura Dahlmeier; Franziska Preuß; Denise Herrmann	Detail
7	8 February 2019	(Canada) Canmore	4x6 km Relay	Germany Vanessa Hinz; Franziska Hildebrand; Denise Herrmann; Laura Dahlmeier	Norway Emilie Ågheim Kalkenberg; Ingrid Landmark Tandrevold; Tiril Eckhoff; Marte Olsbu Røiseland	France Anaïs Chevalier; Justine Braisaz; Anaïs Bescond; Julia Simon	Detail
WC	16 March 2019	(Sweden) Östersund	4x6 km Relay	Norway Synnøve Solemdal; Ingrid Landmark Tandrevold; Tiril Eckhoff; Marte Olsbu Røiseland	Sweden Linn Persson; Mona Brorsson; Anna Magnusson; Hanna Öberg	Ukraine Anastasiya Merkushyna; Vita Semerenko; Yuliia Dzhima; Valentyna Semerenko	Detail

=== Mixed ===
Stage	Date	Place	Discipline	Winner	Second	Third	Det.
1	2 December 2018	(Slovenia) Pokljuka	1x6 km + 1x7.5 km Single Mixed Relay	Norway Thekla Brun-Lie; Lars Helge Birkeland	Austria Lisa Theresa Hauser; Simon Eder	Ukraine Anastasiya Merkushyna; Artem Tyshchenko	Detail
1	2 December 2018	(Slovenia) Pokljuka	2x6 km + 2x7.5 km Mixed Relay	France Anaïs Bescond; Justine Braisaz; Martin Fourcade; Simon Desthieux	Switzerland Elisa Gasparin; Lena Häcki; Benjamin Weger; Jeremy Finello	Italy Lisa Vittozzi; Dorothea Wierer; Dominik Windisch; Lukas Hofer	Detail
8	17 February 2019	(United States) Salt Lake City	1x6 km + 1x7.5 km Single Mixed Relay	Italy Lukas Hofer; Dorothea Wierer	Austria Simon Eder; Lisa Theresa Hauser	France Antonin Guigonnat; Julia Simon	Detail
8	17 February 2019	(United States) Salt Lake City	2x7.5 km + 2x6 km Mixed Relay	France Quentin Fillon Maillet; Simon Desthieux; Célia Aymonier; Anaïs Chevalier	Germany Erik Lesser; Benedikt Doll; Franziska Hildebrand; Vanessa Hinz	Norway Vetle Sjåstad Christiansen; Johannes Thingnes Bø; Tiril Eckhoff; Marte Olsbu Røiseland	Detail
WC	7 March 2019	(Sweden) Östersund	2x6 km + 2x7.5 km Mixed Relay	Norway Marte Olsbu Røiseland; Tiril Eckhoff; Johannes Thingnes Bø; Vetle Sjåstad Christiansen	Germany Vanessa Hinz; Denise Herrmann; Arnd Peiffer; Benedikt Doll	Italy Lisa Vittozzi; Dorothea Wierer; Lukas Hofer; Dominik Windisch	Detail
WC	14 March 2019	(Sweden) Östersund	1x6 km + 1x7.5 km Single Mixed Relay	Norway Marte Olsbu Røiseland; Johannes Thingnes Bø	Italy Dorothea Wierer; Lukas Hofer	Sweden Hanna Öberg; Sebastian Samuelsson	Detail

== Standings (men) ==
=== Overall ===
Pos.		Points
1.	(Norway) Johannes Thingnes Bø	1262
2.	(Russia) Alexandr Loginov	854
3.	(France) Quentin Fillon Maillet	843
4.	(France) Simon Desthieux	831
5.	(Germany) Arnd Peiffer	802

- Final standings after 25 races.

=== Individual ===
Pos.		Points
1.	(Norway) Johannes Thingnes Bø	128
2.	(Norway) Vetle Sjåstad Christiansen	118
3.	(Norway) Lars Helge Birkeland	97
4.	(Germany) Arnd Peiffer	88
5.	(Russia) Alexandr Loginov	87

- Final standings after 3 races.

=== Sprint ===
Pos.		Points
1.	(Norway) Johannes Thingnes Bø	514
2.	(Russia) Alexandr Loginov	350
3.	(France) Simon Desthieux	338
4.	(Germany) Benedikt Doll	305
5.	(France) Antonin Guigonnat	271

- Final standings after 9 races.

=== Pursuit ===
Pos.		Points
1.	(Norway) Johannes Thingnes Bø	386
2.	(France) Quentin Fillon Maillet	315
3.	(Russia) Alexandr Loginov	305
4.	(France) Simon Desthieux	271
5.	(Norway) Tarjei Bø	266

- Final standings after 8 races.

=== Mass start ===
Pos.		Points
1.	(Norway) Johannes Thingnes Bø	262
2.	(Germany) Arnd Peiffer	219
3.	(France) Quentin Fillon Maillet	218
4.	(Austria) Julian Eberhard	196
5.	(Germany) Benedikt Doll	167

- Final standings after 5 races.

=== Relay ===
Pos.		Points
1.	Norway	270
2.	Russia	236
3.	Germany	233
4.	France	226
5.	Austria	208

- Final standings after 5 races.

=== Nation ===
Pos.		Points
1.	Norway	8147
2.	France	7598
3.	Germany	7447
4.	Russia	6975
5.	Austria	6789

- Final standings after 23 races.

== Standings (women) ==
=== Overall ===
Pos.		Points
1.	(Italy) Dorothea Wierer	905
2.	(Italy) Lisa Vittozzi	882
3.	(Slovakia) Anastasiya Kuzmina	870
4.	(Norway) Marte Olsbu Røiseland	855
5.	(Sweden) Hanna Öberg	741

- Final standings after 25 races.

=== Individual ===
Pos.		Points
1.	(Italy) Lisa Vittozzi	140
2.	(Slovakia) Paulína Fialková	111
3.	(Czech Republic) Markéta Davidová	102
4.	(Sweden) Hanna Öberg	94
5.	(Austria) Lisa Theresa Hauser	94

- Final standings after 3 races.

=== Sprint ===
Pos.		Points
1.	(Slovakia) Anastasiya Kuzmina	371
2.	(Italy) Dorothea Wierer	330
3.	(Norway) Marte Olsbu Røiseland	326
4.	(Italy) Lisa Vittozzi	309
5.	(Finland) Kaisa Mäkäräinen	280

- Final standings after 9 races.

=== Pursuit ===
Pos.		Points
1.	(Italy) Dorothea Wierer	328
2.	(Norway) Marte Olsbu Røiseland	312
3.	(Slovakia) Anastasiya Kuzmina	309
4.	(Italy) Lisa Vittozzi	301
5.	(Finland) Kaisa Mäkäräinen	286

- Final standings after 8 races.

=== Mass start ===
Pos.		Points
1.	(Sweden) Hanna Öberg	220
2.	(Italy) Dorothea Wierer	194
2.	(Slovakia) Paulína Fialková	194
4.	(Norway) Marte Olsbu Røiseland	161
5.	(Russia) Ekaterina Yurlova-Percht	155

- Final standings after 5 races.

=== Relay ===
Pos.		Points
1.	Norway	249
2.	Germany	241
3.	France	230
4.	Sweden	216
5.	Italy	190

- Final standings after 5 races.

=== Nation ===
Pos.		Points
1.	Norway	7432
2.	Germany	7372
3.	France	7222
4.	Italy	6808
5.	Sweden	6641

- Final standings after 23 races.

== Standings: Mixed ==
=== Mixed relay ===
Pos.		Points
1.	Norway	306
2.	France	281
3.	Italy	267
4.	Germany	264
5.	Sweden	238

- Final standings after 6 races.

== Medal table ==
Rank	Nation	Gold	Silver	Bronze	Total
1	Norway	28	15	5	48
2	Italy	8	7	6	21
3	France	7	10	15	32
4	Germany	6	14	13	33
5	Slovakia	5	3	4	12
6	Russia	3	4	7	14
7	Finland	3	3	1	7
8	Sweden	3	2	7	12
9	Ukraine	2	0	2	4
10	Czech Republic	1	2	2	5
11	Austria	0	3	3	6
12	Bulgaria	0	1	0	1
12	Poland	0	1	0	1
12	Switzerland	0	1	0	1
15	United States	0	0	1	1
Totals (15 entries)		66	66	66	198

== Achievements ==
First World Cup career victory

Men

- Alexandr Loginov (RUS), 26, in his 5th season — Stage 4 Sprint in Oberhof; first podium was 2012–13 Pursuit in Oslo Holmenkollen
- Quentin Fillon Maillet (FRA), 26, in his 6th season — Stage 6 Mass Start in Anterselva; first podium was 2014–15 Mass Start in Ruhpolding
- Vetle Sjåstad Christiansen (NOR), 26, in his 7th season — Stage 8 Sprint in Salt Lake City; first podium was 2018–19 Pursuit in Hochfilzen
- Dmytro Pidruchnyi (UKR), 27, in his 7th season — World Championships Pursuit in Östersund; it also was his first podium

Women

- Yuliia Dzhima (UKR), 28, in her 7th season — Stage 1 Individual in Pokljuka; first podium was 2013–14 Pursuit in Hochfilzen
- Marte Olsbu Røiseland (NOR), 28, in her 7th season — Stage 3 Sprint in Nové Město; first podium was 2015–16 Sprint in Khanty-Mansiysk
- Lisa Vittozzi (ITA), 23, in her 5th season — Stage 4 Sprint in Oberhof; first podium was 2016–17 Pursuit in Kontiolahti
- Franziska Preuß (GER), 24, in her 6th season — Stage 5 Mass start in Ruhpolding; first podium was 2014–15 Mass start in Ruhpolding
- Markéta Davidová (CZE), 22, in her 3rd season — Stage 6 Sprint in Anterselva; first podium was 2018–19 Individual in Pokljuka
- Hanna Öberg (SWE), 23, in her 3rd season — World Championships Individual in Östersund; first podium was 2018–19 Pursuit in Nové Město

First World Cup podium

Men

- Johannes Kühn (GER), 27, in his 6th season — no. 2 in the Stage 1 Individual in Pokljuka
- Vetle Sjåstad Christiansen (NOR), 26, in his 7th season — no. 3 in the Stage 2 Pursuit in Hochfilzen
- Martin Ponsiluoma (SWE), 23, in his 2nd season — no. 3 in the Stage 3 Sprint in Nové Město
- Sebastian Samuelsson (SWE), 21, in his 2nd season — no. 3 in the Stage 4 Sprint in Oberhof
- Roman Rees (GER), 25, in his 3rd season — no. 3 in the Stage 8 Sprint in Salt Lake City
- Vladimir Iliev (BUL), 31, in his 13th season — no. 2 in the World Championships Individual in Östersund

Women

- Markéta Davidová (CZE), 21, in her 3rd season — no. 3 in the Stage 1 Individual in Pokljuka
- Hanna Öberg (SWE), 23, in her 3rd season — no. 3 in the Stage 3 Pursuit in Nové Město
- Ingrid Landmark Tandrevold (NOR), 22, in her 4th season — no. 2 in the Stage 5 Mass start in Ruhpolding
- Clare Egan (USA), 31, in her 5th season — no. 3 in the Stage 9 Mass start in Oslo Holmenkollen

Victory in this World Cup (all-time number of victories in parentheses)

Men

- Johannes Thingnes Bø (NOR), 16 (37) first places
- Martin Fourcade (FRA), 2 (72) first places
- Quentin Fillon Maillet (FRA), 2 (2) first places
- Arnd Peiffer (GER), 1 (9) first place
- Dominik Windisch (ITA), 1 (2) first place
- Alexandr Loginov (RUS), 1 (1) first place
- Vetle Sjåstad Christiansen (NOR), 1 (1) first place
- Dmytro Pidruchnyi (UKR), 1 (1) first place

Women

- Anastasia Kuzmina (SVK), 5 (16) first places
- Kaisa Mäkäräinen (FIN), 3 (26) first places
- Dorothea Wierer (ITA), 3 (7) first places
- Marte Olsbu Røiseland (NOR), 3 (3) first places
- Denise Herrmann (GER), 2 (4) first places
- Lisa Vittozzi (ITA), 2 (2) first places
- Hanna Öberg (SWE), 2 (2) first places
- Laura Dahlmeier (GER), 1 (20) first place
- Tiril Eckhoff (NOR), 1 (6) first place
- Yuliia Dzhima (UKR), 1 (1) first place
- Franziska Preuß (GER), 1 (1) first place
- Markéta Davidová (CZE), 1 (1) first place

== Retirements ==
The following notable biathletes retired during or after the 2018–19 season:

Men

- Sven Grossegger (AUT)
- Daniel Mesotitsch (AUT)
- Michael Rösch (BEL)
- Michail Kletcherov (BGR)
- Kristyan Stoyanov (BGR)
- Vladimir Chepelin (BLR)
- Brendan Green (CAN)
- Nathan Smith (CAN)
- Kauri Kõiv (EST)
- Roland Lessing (EST)
- Martin Remmelg (EST)
- Tuomas Gronman (FIN)
- Simon Fourcade (FRA)
- Pietro Dutto (ITA)
- Kazuya Inomata (JPN)
- Timur Khamitgatin (KAZ)
- Daumants Lusa (LAT)
- Henrik L'Abée-Lund (NOR)
- Sergey Korastylev (RUS)
- Vladimir Semakov (RUS)
- Anton Shipulin (RUS)
- Milanko Petrović (SRB)
- Mitja Drinovec (SLO)
- Christoffer Eriksson (SWE)
- Fredrik Lindström (SWE)
- Vitaliy Kilchytskyy (UKR)

Women

- Susanne Hoffmann (AUT)
- Inna Kostyuchenko (BLR)
- Darya Yurkevich (BLR)
- Emilia Yordanova (BUL)
- Rosanna Crawford (CAN)
- Megan Tandy (CAN)
- Wang Xuelan (CHN)
- Gabriela Koukalová (CZE)
- Laura Toivanen (FIN)
- Enora Latuillière (FRA)
- Laura Dahlmeier (GER)
- Annika Knoll (GER)
- Luise Kummer (GER)
- Miriam Neureuther (GER)
- Uiloq Slettemark (GRL)
- Hwang Hye-suk (KOR)
- Diana Rasimovičiūtė (LTU)
- Anastasiya Nychyporenko (MDA)
- Galina Nechkasova (RUS)
- Kristina Tokareva (RUS)
- Victoria Padial Hernandez (SPA)
