= 2018–19 Biathlon World Cup – Mass start Men =

The 2018–19 Biathlon World Cup – Mass start Men started on Sunday 23 December 2018 in Nové Město and finished on Sunday 24 March 2019 in Oslo Holmenkollen. The defending titlist was Martin Fourcade of France.

The small crystal globe winner for the category was Johannes Thingnes Bø of Norway.

== Competition format ==
In the mass start, all biathletes start at the same time and the first across the finish line wins. In this 15 kilometres (9.3 mi) competition, the distance is skied over five laps; there are four bouts of shooting (two prone and two standing, in that order) with the first shooting bout being at the lane corresponding to the competitor's bib number (bib #10 shoots at lane #10 regardless of position in race), with the rest of the shooting bouts being on a first-come, first-served basis (if a competitor arrives at the lane in fifth place, they shoot at lane 5). As in the sprint and pursuit, competitors must ski one 150 metres (490 ft) penalty loop for each miss. Here again, to avoid unwanted congestion, World Cup Mass starts are held with only the 30 top ranking athletes on the start line (half that of the pursuit) as here all contestants start simultaneously.

== 2017–18 Top 3 standings ==
| Medal | Athlete | Points |
|---|---|---|
| Gold: | (France) Martin Fourcade | 60 |
| Silver: | (Norway) Johannes Thingnes Bø | 54 |
| Bronze: | (Germany) Erik Lesser | 48 |

== Medal winners ==
| Event | Gold | Time | Silver | Time | Bronze | Time |
|---|---|---|---|---|---|---|
| Nové Město details | Johannes Thingnes Bø; Norway | 37:25.2 (0+0+0+0) | Quentin Fillon Maillet; France | 38:11.7 (0+0+1+1) | Evgeniy Garanichev; Russia | 38:19.3 (0+0+0+0) |
| Ruhpolding details | Johannes Thingnes Bø; Norway | 36:43.8 (0+0+0+1) | Julian Eberhard; Austria | 36:44.4 (0+1+0+1) | Quentin Fillon Maillet; France | 36:46.6 (0+1+0+0) |
| Antholz-Anterselva details | Quentin Fillon Maillet; France | 34:39.4 (0+0+0+0) | Johannes Thingnes Bø; Norway | 34:53.7 (0+0+1+1) | Arnd Peiffer; Germany | 35:04.0 (0+0+0+0) |
| World Championships details | Dominik Windisch; Italy | 40:54.1 (1+1+1+0) | Antonin Guigonnat; France | 41:16.9 (2+0+0+1) | Julian Eberhard; Austria | 41:17.4 (0+0+3+1) |
| Oslo Holmenkollen details | Johannes Thingnes Bø; Norway | 37:25.6 (0+0+0+0) | Arnd Peiffer; Germany | 37:44.8 (0+0+0+0) | Benedikt Doll; Germany | 38:03.6 (1+0+0+1) |

== Standings ==
| # | Name | NOV | RUH | ANT | ÖST | OSL | Total |
|---|---|---|---|---|---|---|---|
| 1 | Johannes Thingnes Bø (NOR) | 60 | 60 | 54 | 28 | 60 | 262 |
| 2 | Arnd Peiffer (GER) | 43 | 36 | 48 | 38 | 54 | 219 |
| 3 | Quentin Fillon Maillet (FRA) | 54 | 48 | 60 | 40 | 16 | 218 |
| 4 | Julian Eberhard (AUT) | 21 | 54 | 30 | 48 | 43 | 196 |
| 5 | Benedikt Doll (GER) | 38 | 20 | 27 | 34 | 48 | 167 |
| 6 | Simon Desthieux (FRA) | 36 | 38 | 23 | 30 | 36 | 163 |
| 7 | Vetle Sjåstad Christiansen (NOR) | 20 | 40 | 29 | 29 | 40 | 158 |
| 8 | Simon Eder (AUT) | 27 | 32 | 31 | 36 | 27 | 153 |
| 9 | Evgeniy Garanichev (RUS) | 48 | 25 | 36 | 25 | 10 | 144 |
| 10 | Alexandr Loginov (RUS) | 26 | 24 | 21 | 43 | 23 | 137 |
| 11 | Tarjei Bø (NOR) | 25 | 31 | 14 | 32 | 31 | 133 |
| 12 | Martin Fourcade (FRA) | 32 | 43 | 43 | 14 | — | 132 |
| 13 | Benjamin Weger (SUI) | 29 | 34 | 38 | 23 | 6 | 130 |
| 14 | Lukas Hofer (ITA) | 23 | 18 | 26 | 24 | 38 | 129 |
| 15 | Antonin Guigonnat (FRA) | 14 | 10 | 40 | 54 | 4 | 122 |
| 16 | Dominik Windisch (ITA) | — | — | 28 | 60 | 25 | 113 |
| 17 | Erlend Bjøntegaard (NOR) | 40 | 16 | 18 | 18 | 21 | 113 |
| 18 | Henrik L'Abée-Lund (NOR) | 28 | 8 | 24 | — | 34 | 94 |
| 19 | Michal Krčmář (CZE) | 31 | 23 | 16 | 6 | 18 | 94 |
| 20 | Dmytro Pidruchnyi (UKR) | 24 | 4 | 10 | 31 | 22 | 91 |
| 21 | Andrejs Rastorgujevs (LAT) | — | 21 | 25 | 12 | 30 | 88 |
| 22 | Jakov Fak (SLO) | 30 | — | — | 27 | 26 | 83 |
| 23 | Ondřej Moravec (CZE) | 34 | 26 | 12 | — | — | 72 |
| 24 | Emilien Jacquelin (FRA) | — | 22 | 32 | — | 12 | 66 |
| 25 | Lars Helge Birkeland (NOR) | — | 27 | 34 | — | — | 61 |
| 26 | Philipp Nawrath (GER) | — | — | — | 26 | 32 | 58 |
| 27 | Sean Doherty (USA) | — | 28 | — | 20 | 8 | 56 |
| 28 | Sebastian Samuelsson (SWE) | 4 | 6 | 6 | 10 | 20 | 46 |
| 29 | Christian Gow (CAN) | 6 | 30 | 8 | — | — | 44 |
| 30 | Matvey Eliseev (RUS) | 2 | 14 | 4 | — | 24 | 44 |
| # | Name | NOV | RUH | ANT | ÖST | OSL | Total |
| 31 | Felix Leitner (AUT) | — | — | — | 22 | 14 | 36 |
| 32 | Johannes Kühn (GER) | 12 | 2 | 20 | — | — | 34 |
| 33 | Artem Pryma (UKR) | 8 | — | 22 | — | — | 30 |
| 34 | Krasimir Anev (BUL) | — | 29 | — | — | — | 29 |
| 34 | Fabien Claude (FRA) | — | — | — | — | 29 | 29 |
| 36 | Lucas Fratzscher (GER) | — | — | — | — | 28 | 28 |
| 37 | Martin Ponsiluoma (SWE) | 22 | — | — | — | — | 22 |
| 38 | Tomáš Krupčík (CZE) | — | — | — | 21 | — | 21 |
| 39 | Dmitry Malyshko (RUS) | 18 | — | — | — | — | 18 |
| 40 | Simon Schempp (GER) | 16 | — | — | — | — | 16 |
| 40 | Jeremy Finello (SUI) | — | — | — | 16 | — | 16 |
| 42 | Dominik Landertinger (AUT) | — | 12 | — | — | — | 12 |
| 43 | Jesper Nelin (SWE) | 10 | — | — | — | — | 10 |
| 44 | Erik Lesser (GER) | — | — | — | 8 | 2 | 10 |
| 45 | Vladimir Iliev (BUL) | — | — | — | 4 | — | 4 |
| 46 | Martin Jäger (SUI) | — | — | 2 | — | — | 2 |
| 46 | Leif Nordgren (USA) | — | — | — | 2 | — | 2 |
