= 2018–19 Biathlon World Cup – Mass start Women =

The 2018–19 Biathlon World Cup – Mass start Women started on 23 December 2018 in Nové Město and finished on 24 March 2019 in Holmenkollen. It was won by Hanna Öberg of Sweden, with the defending titlist, Kaisa Mäkäräinen of Finland, finishing 21st.

== Competition format ==
In the mass start, all biathletes start at the same time and the first across the finish line wins. In this 12.5 kilometres (7.8 mi) competition, the distance is skied over five laps; there are four bouts of shooting (two prone and two standing, in that order) with the first shooting bout being at the lane corresponding to the competitor's bib number (bib #10 shoots at lane #10 regardless of position in race), with the rest of the shooting bouts being on a first-come, first-served basis (if a competitor arrives at the lane in fifth place, they shoot at lane 5). As in the sprint and pursuit, competitors must ski one 150 metres (490 ft) penalty loop for each miss. Here again, to avoid unwanted congestion, World Cup Mass starts are held with only the 30 top ranking athletes on the start line (half that of the pursuit) as here all contestants start simultaneously.

== 2017–18 Top 3 standings ==
Medal	Athlete	Points
Gold:	(Finland) Kaisa Mäkäräinen	216
Silver:	(Germany) Laura Dahlmeier	207
Bronze:	(Germany) Vanessa Hinz	195

== Medal winners ==
Event	Gold	Time	Silver	Time	Bronze	Time
Nové Město details	Anastasiya Kuzmina; Slovakia	35:34.4 (1+0+0+1)	Paulína Fialková; Slovakia	35:46.5 (0+0+1+1)	Anaïs Chevalier; France	35:47.7 (1+1+1+0)
Ruhpolding details	Franziska Preuß; Germany	32:34.0 (0+0+0+0)	Ingrid Landmark Tandrevold; Norway	32:34.2 (0+0+0+0)	Paulína Fialková; Slovakia	32:49.1 (0+0+1+0)
Antholz-Anterselva details	Laura Dahlmeier; Germany	35:32.8 (1+0+0+0)	Markéta Davidová; Czech Republic	35:45.9 (0+0+1+0)	Vanessa Hinz; Germany	35:49.2 (1+0+0+0)
World Championships details	Dorothea Wierer; Italy	37:26.4 (0+0+0+2)	Ekaterina Yurlova-Percht; Russia	37:31.3 (0+0+1+1)	Denise Herrmann; Germany	37:41.8 (0+1+2+1)
Oslo Holmenkollen details	Hanna Öberg; Sweden	35:56.2 (0+0+1+1)	Tiril Eckhoff; Norway	35:57.5 (0+0+2+1)	Clare Egan; United States	36:06.6 (0+0+0+1)

== Standings ==
#	Name	NOV	RUH	ANT	ÖST	OSL	Total
1	Hanna Öberg (SWE)	31	43	43	43	60	220
2	Dorothea Wierer (ITA)	43	22	40	60	29	194
3	Paulína Fialková (SVK)	54	48	25	29	38	194
4	Marte Olsbu Røiseland (NOR)	28	34	31	36	32	161
5	Ekaterina Yurlova-Percht (RUS)	32	24	22	54	23	155
6	Ingrid Landmark Tandrevold (NOR)	38	54	10	30	22	154
7	Franziska Preuß (GER)	36	60	—	22	34	152
8	Mona Brorsson (SWE)	40	31	32	27	20	150
9	Denise Herrmann (GER)	—	29	28	48	43	148
10	Anastasiya Kuzmina (SVK)	60	27	21	6	31	145
11	Iryna Kryuko (BLR)	26	38	36	14	28	142
12	Lisa Vittozzi (ITA)	8	30	30	34	30	132
13	Laura Dahlmeier (GER)	—	2	60	38	25	125
14	Clare Egan (USA)	27	14	26	10	48	125
15	Tiril Eckhoff (NOR)	—	—	29	40	54	123
16	Markéta Davidová (CZE)	—	—	54	25	27	106
17	Vanessa Hinz (GER)	30	26	48	—	—	104
18	Monika Hojnisz (POL)	29	10	27	28	10	104
19	Justine Braisaz (FRA)	34	20	20	26	DNF	100
20	Anaïs Bescond (FRA)	20	32	24	—	24	100
21	Kaisa Mäkäräinen (FIN)	18	8	38	16	16	96
22	Linn Persson (SWE)	—	36	—	32	21	89
23	Lisa Theresa Hauser (AUT)	2	28	16	—	40	86
24	Julia Simon (FRA)	24	25	DNF	—	36	85
25	Franziska Hildebrand (GER)	25	16	8	20	12	81
26	Lena Häcki (SUI)	12	40	12	2	8	74
27	Svetlana Mironova (RUS)	—	21	23	—	26	70
28	Anaïs Chevalier (FRA)	48	4	—	—	—	52
29	Karolin Horchler (GER)	—	18	34	—	—	52
30	Irina Starykh (RUS)	6	23	18	—	—	47
#	Name	NOV	RUH	ANT	ÖST	OSL	Total
31	Celia Aymonier (FRA)	—	—	—	21	18	39
32	Joanne Reid (USA)	—	—	—	31	—	31
33	Evgeniya Pavlova (RUS)	—	6	—	23	—	29
34	Veronika Vítková (CZE)	—	—	—	24	4	28
35	Anastasiya Merkushyna (UKR)	16	—	—	12	—	28
36	Olena Pidhrushna (UKR)	23	—	—	—	—	23
37	Kinga Zbylut (POL)	22	—	—	—	—	22
38	Yuliia Dzhima (UKR)	21	—	—	—	—	21
39	Selina Gasparin (SUI)	—	—	—	18	—	18
40	Elisabeth Högberg (SWE)	—	—	—	—	14	14
40	Valj Semerenko (UKR)	14	—	—	—	—	14
40	Fuyuko Tachizaki (JPN)	—	—	14	—	—	14
43	Susan Dunklee (USA)	—	12	—	—	—	12
44	Federica Sanfilippo (ITA)	10	—	—	—	—	10
45	Baiba Bendika (LAT)	—	—	—	8	—	8
46	Rosanna Crawford (CAN)	—	—	6	—	—	6
46	Emma Lunder (CAN)	—	—	—	—	6	6
48	Elisa Gasparin (SUI)	—	—	—	4	—	4
48	Vita Semerenko (UKR)	4	—	—	—	—	4
48	Nicole Gontier (ITA)	—	—	4	—	—	4
