= 2018–19 Biathlon World Cup – Relay Men =

The 2018–19 Biathlon World Cup – Relay Men started on Sunday 16 December 2018 in Hochfilzen and finished on Saturday 16 March 2019 in Östersund. The defending team was Norway.

The winning team was Norway.

== Competition format ==
The relay teams consist of four biathletes. Every athlete's leg is skied over three 2.5 kilometres (1.6 mi) laps for a total of 7.5 kilometres (4.7 mi), with two shooting rounds: one prone and one standing. For every round of five targets there are eight bullets available, though the last three can only be single-loaded manually from the spare round holders or from bullets deposited by the athlete into trays or onto the mat at the firing line. If after eight bullets there are still standing targets, one 150 metres (490 ft) penalty loop must be taken for each remaining target. The first-leg participants start all at the same time, and as in cross-country skiing relays, every athlete of a team must touch the team's next-leg participant to perform a valid changeover. On the first shooting stage of the first leg, the participant must shoot in the lane corresponding to their bib number (bib #10 shoots at lane #10 regardless of their position in the race), then for the remainder of the relay, the athletes shoot at the lane corresponding to the position they arrived (arrive at the range in 5th place, shoot at lane five).

== 2017–18 Top 3 standings ==
Medal	Nation	Points
Gold:	Norway	228
Silver:	Sweden	184
Bronze:	France	180

== Medal winners ==
Event	Gold	Time	Silver	Time	Bronze	Time
Hochfilzen details	Sweden Peppe Femling; Martin Ponsiluoma; Torstein Stenersen; Sebastian Samuelsson	1:16:10.6 (0+0) (0+0) (0+2) (0+1) (0+0) (0+0) (0+0) (0+2)	Norway Lars Helge Birkeland; Henrik L'Abée-Lund; Tarjei Bø; Vetle Sjåstad Christiansen	1:16:14.2 (0+0) (0+0) (0+1) (0+3) (0+0) (0+2) (0+1) (0+0)	Germany Simon Schempp; Johannes Kühn; Arnd Peiffer; Benedikt Doll	1:16:39.4 (0+2) (0+0) (0+0) (1+3) (0+0) (0+0) (0+0) (0+1)
Oberhof details	Russia Maxim Tsvetkov; Evgeniy Garanichev; Dmitry Malyshko; Alexandr Loginov	1:20:54.3 (0+0) (0+0) (0+0) (0+0) (0+1) (0+1) (0+2) (0+2)	France Antonin Guigonnat; Simon Desthieux; Quentin Fillon Maillet; Martin Fourcade	1:21:55.4 (0+1) (0+1) (0+0) (1+3) (0+3) (0+0) (0+0) (0+0)	Austria Tobias Eberhard; Simon Eder; Dominik Landertinger; Julian Eberhard	1:23:12.9 (0+0) (1+3) (0+0) (0+0) (0+0) (0+1) (0+1) (0+2)
Ruhpolding details	Norway Lars Helge Birkeland; Vetle Sjåstad Christiansen; Tarjei Bø; Johannes Thingnes Bø	1:09:54.3 (0+1) (0+1) (0+0) (0+1) (0+0) (0+2) (0+0) (0+3)	Germany Roman Rees; Johannes Kühn; Arnd Peiffer; Benedikt Doll	1:10:07.8 (0+0) (0+0) (0+1) (0+3) (0+0) (0+0) (0+1) (0+1)	France Emilien Jacquelin; Martin Fourcade; Quentin Fillon Maillet; Simon Desthieux	1:10:20.5 (0+1) (0+1) (0+1) (0+0) (0+2) (0+2) (0+0) (0+2)
Canmore details	Norway Lars Helge Birkeland; Vetle Sjåstad Christiansen; Erlend Bjøntegaard; Johannes Thingnes Bø	1:16:36.6 (0+1) (0+1) (0+1) (0+1) (0+1) (0+2) (0+0) (0+0)	France Antonin Guigonnat; Emilien Jacquelin; Simon Fourcade; Quentin Fillon Maillet	1:17:47.0 (0+2) (0+0) (0+0) (0+1) (0+0) (0+1) (0+1) (0+3)	Russia Evgeniy Garanichev; Eduard Latypov; Alexandr Loginov; Alexander Povarnitsyn	1:18:25.0 (0+0) (0+3) (0+0) (0+0) (0+2) (0+2) (0+0) (0+2)
World Championships details	Norway Lars Helge Birkeland; Vetle Sjåstad Christiansen; Tarjei Bø; Johannes Thingnes Bø	1:12:03.7 (0+1) (0+0) (0+0) (0+0) (0+0) (0+2) (0+0) (0+3)	Germany Erik Lesser; Roman Rees; Arnd Peiffer; Benedikt Doll	1:12:41.8 (0+1) (0+1) (0+1) (0+2) (0+0) (0+1) (0+1) (0+1)	Russia Matvey Eliseev; Nikita Porshnev; Dmitry Malyshko; Alexandr Loginov	1:13:07.8 (0+0) (0+2) (0+1) (0+1) (0+2) (0+1) (0+0) (0+0)

== Standings ==
#	Nation	HOC	OBE	RUH	CAN	ÖST	Total
1	Norway	54	36	60	60	60	270
2	Russia	40	60	40	48	48	236
3	Germany	48	34	54	43	54	233
4	France	32	54	48	54	38	226
5	Austria	43	48	43	40	34	208
6	Sweden	60	40	38	28	36	202
7	Czech Republic	36	43	34	38	43	194
8	Italy	38	38	32	34	26	168
9	Switzerland	34	31	30	26	30	151
10	Ukraine	25	19	36	36	29	145
11	Belarus	24	28	31	29	31	143
12	Slovakia	26	30	28	32	23	139
13	Estonia	22	27	23	30	27	129
14	Slovenia	30	32	26	—	40	128
14	Bulgaria	31	17	29	19	32	128
14	Canada	21	23	25	31	28	128
17	Poland	23	29	21	25	25	123
18	United States	29	22	24	24	22	121
19	Belgium	28	20	22	27	18	115
20	Finland	27	25	27	—	24	103
20	Japan	20	26	16	20	21	103
22	Romania	17	24	18	23	19	101
23	South Korea	18	15	15	21	15	84
24	Lithuania	16	21	17	—	20	74
25	Kazakhstan	19	16	20	—	16	71
26	Latvia	0	14	14	22	17	67
27	China	—	18	19	18	—	55
