= 2018–19 Biathlon World Cup – Individual Men =

The 2018–19 Biathlon World Cup – Individual Men started on Thursday 6 December 2018 in Pokljuka and finished on Wednesday 13 March 2019 in Östersund. The defending titlist was Johannes Thingnes Bø of Norway.

The small crystal globe winner for the category was Johannes Thingnes Bø of Norway.

== Competition format ==
The 20 kilometres (12 mi) individual race is the oldest biathlon event; the distance is skied over five laps. The biathlete shoots four times at any shooting lane, in the order of prone, standing, prone, standing, totalling 20 targets. For each missed target a fixed penalty time, usually one minute, is added to the skiing time of the biathlete. Competitors' starts are staggered, normally by 30 seconds.

== 2017–18 Top 3 standings ==
| Medal | Athlete | Points |
|---|---|---|
| Gold: | (Norway) Johannes Thingnes Bø | 108 |
| Gold: | (France) Martin Fourcade | 108 |
| Bronze: | (France) Quentin Fillon Maillet | 75 |

== Medal winners ==
| Event | Gold | Time | Silver | Time | Bronze | Time |
|---|---|---|---|---|---|---|
| Pokljuka details | Martin Fourcade; France | 47:09.2 (0+0+0+0) | Johannes Kühn; Germany | 47:13.4 (0+0+0+0) | Simon Eder; Austria | 47:28.9 (0+0+0+0) |
| Canmore details | Johannes Thingnes Bø; Norway | 35:27.9 (0+0+0+0) | Vetle Sjåstad Christiansen; Norway | 37:38.1 (1+0+0+1) | Alexandr Loginov; Russia | 38:08.9 (1+1+0+0) |
| World Championships details | Arnd Peiffer; Germany | 52:42.4 (0+0+0+0) | Vladimir Iliev; Bulgaria | 53:51.1 (0+1+0+0) | Tarjei Bø; Norway | 53:51.5 (0+1+0+0) |

== Standings ==
| # | Name | POK | CAN | ÖST | Total |
|---|---|---|---|---|---|
| 1 | Johannes Thingnes Bø (NOR) | 36 | 60 | 32 | 128 |
| 2 | Vetle Sjåstad Christiansen (NOR) | 30 | 54 | 34 | 118 |
| 3 | Lars Helge Birkeland (NOR) | 31 | 43 | 23 | 97 |
| 4 | Arnd Peiffer (GER) | 0 | 28 | 60 | 88 |
| 5 | Alexandr Loginov (RUS) | 12 | 48 | 27 | 87 |
| 6 | Simon Desthieux (FRA) | 19 | 30 | 38 | 87 |
| 7 | Simon Eder (AUT) | 48 | 38 | DNF | 86 |
| 8 | Erik Lesser (GER) | 18 | 34 | 30 | 82 |
| 9 | Sebastian Samuelsson (SWE) | 32 | — | 43 | 75 |
| 10 | Lukas Hofer (ITA) | 14 | 20 | 40 | 74 |
| 11 | Evgeniy Garanichev (RUS) | 5 | 27 | 36 | 68 |
| 12 | Martin Fourcade (FRA) | 60 | — | 2 | 62 |
| 13 | Johannes Kühn (GER) | 54 | 5 | — | 59 |
| 14 | Simon Fourcade (FRA) | — | 36 | 22 | 58 |
| 15 | Christian Gow (CAN) | 25 | 31 | DNF | 56 |
| 16 | Vladimir Iliev (BUL) | 0 | 0 | 54 | 54 |
| 17 | Tarjei Bø (NOR) | 6 | — | 48 | 54 |
| 18 | Quentin Fillon Maillet (FRA) | 9 | 16 | 29 | 54 |
| 19 | Dominik Windisch (ITA) | 0 | 40 | 12 | 52 |
| 20 | Tomáš Krupčík (CZE) | 0 | 29 | 19 | 48 |
| 21 | Andrejs Rastorgujevs (LAT) | — | 18 | 28 | 46 |
| 22 | Antonin Guigonnat (FRA) | 34 | 10 | — | 44 |
| 23 | Michal Krčmář (CZE) | 26 | 0 | 18 | 44 |
| 24 | Jakov Fak (SLO) | 43 | — | 0 | 43 |
| 25 | Scott Gow (CAN) | 27 | 1 | 15 | 43 |
| 26 | Jesper Nelin (SWE) | 28 | — | 13 | 41 |
| 27 | Simon Schempp (GER) | 40 | — | — | 40 |
| 28 | Serhiy Semenov (UKR) | 38 | 0 | 0 | 38 |
| 29 | Sean Doherty (USA) | 0 | 14 | 24 | 38 |
| 30 | Jeremy Finello (SUI) | 0 | 21 | 17 | 38 |
| # | Name | POK | CAN | ÖST | Total |
| 31 | Felix Leitner (AUT) | 24 | 2 | 11 | 37 |
| 32 | Roman Rees (GER) | — | 12 | 21 | 33 |
| 33 | Peppe Femling (SWE) | 0 | 32 | 0 | 32 |
| 34 | Benedikt Doll (GER) | 0 | 0 | 31 | 31 |
| 35 | Dominik Landertinger (AUT) | 8 | 22 | 0 | 30 |
| 36 | Dmitry Malyshko (RUS) | 29 | — | — | 29 |
| 37 | Erlend Bjøntegaard (NOR) | 3 | 25 | 0 | 28 |
| 38 | Roland Lessing (EST) | — | 11 | 16 | 27 |
| 39 | Vladimir Chepelin (BLR) | 0 | — | 26 | 26 |
| 40 | Eduard Latypov (RUS) | 0 | 26 | — | 26 |
| 41 | Leif Nordgren (USA) | 1 | 0 | 25 | 26 |
| 42 | Emilien Jacquelin (FRA) | 13 | 13 | — | 26 |
| 43 | Philipp Nawrath (GER) | — | 24 | — | 24 |
| 44 | Alexander Povarnitsyn (RUS) | — | 23 | 0 | 23 |
| 45 | Martin Ponsiluoma (SWE) | 23 | — | 0 | 23 |
| 46 | Anton Sinapov (BUL) | 22 | 0 | DNF | 22 |
| 47 | Matvey Eliseev (RUS) | 21 | — | — | 21 |
| 48 | Dimitar Gerdzhikov (BUL) | 0 | 0 | 20 | 20 |
| 49 | Artem Pryma (UKR) | 20 | — | — | 20 |
| 50 | Thomas Bormolini (ITA) | 0 | 19 | 0 | 19 |
| 51 | Julian Eberhard (AUT) | 4 | 15 | 0 | 19 |
| 52 | Grzegorz Guzik (POL) | 0 | 17 | 0 | 17 |
| 53 | Mikito Tachizaki (JPN) | 17 | — | — | 17 |
| 54 | Artem Tyshchenko (UKR) | 10 | 7 | 0 | 17 |
| 55 | Karol Dombrovski (LTU) | 16 | — | 0 | 16 |
| 56 | Mario Dolder (SUI) | 15 | 0 | 0 | 15 |
| 57 | Ondřej Moravec (CZE) | 11 | — | 4 | 15 |
| 58 | Florent Claude (BEL) | 0 | 6 | 9 | 15 |
| 59 | Krasimir Anev (BUL) | 0 | — | 14 | 14 |
| 60 | Tero Seppala (FIN) | 3 | — | 10 | 13 |
| # | Name | POK | CAN | ÖST | Total |
| 61 | Taras Lesiuk (UKR) | — | 9 | — | 9 |
| 62 | Matej Kazár (SVK) | — | 8 | 1 | 9 |
| 63 | Raman Yaliotnau (BLR) | 0 | 0 | 8 | 8 |
| 64 | Timofey Lapshin (KOR) | 0 | 0 | 7 | 7 |
| 65 | Roman Yeremin (KAZ) | 7 | — | 0 | 7 |
| 66 | Michal Šlesingr (CZE) | 0 | 0 | 6 | 6 |
| 67 | Kalev Ermits (EST) | 0 | 3 | 3 | 6 |
| 68 | Nikita Porshnev (RUS) | — | — | 5 | 5 |
| 69 | Benjamin Weger (SUI) | 0 | 4 | 0 | 4 |
