= 2018–19 Biathlon World Cup – Relay Women =

Women relay competition

The 2018–19 Biathlon World Cup – Relay Women started on 16 December 2018 in Hochfilzen and finish on 16 March 2019 at the Biathlon World Championships in Östersund. Norway won; Germany unsuccessfully defended its title.

== Competition format ==
The relay teams consist of four biathletes. Every athlete's leg is skied over three 2 kilometres (1.2 mi) laps for a total of 6 kilometres (3.7 mi), with two shooting rounds: one prone and one standing. For every round of five targets there are eight bullets available, though the last three can only be single-loaded manually from the spare round holders or from bullets deposited by the athlete into trays or onto the mat at the firing line. If after eight bullets there are still standing targets, one 150 metres (490 ft) penalty loop must be taken for each remaining target. The first-leg participants start all at the same time, and as in cross-country skiing relays, every athlete of a team must touch the team's next-leg participant to perform a valid changeover. On the first shooting stage of the first leg, the participant must shoot in the lane corresponding to their bib number (bib #10 shoots at lane #10 regardless of their position in the race), then for the remainder of the relay, the athletes shoot at the lane corresponding to the position they arrived (arrive at the range in 5th place, shoot at lane five).

== 2017–18 Top 3 standings ==
Medal	Nation	Points
Gold:	Germany	228
Silver:	France	200
Bronze:	Italy	169

== Medal winners ==
Event	Gold	Time	Silver	Time	Bronze	Time
Hochfilzen details	Italy Lisa Vittozzi; Alexia Runggaldier; Dorothea Wierer; Federica Sanfilippo	1:10:58.7 (0+0) (0+1) (0+0) (0+2) (0+0) (0+0) (0+0) (0+0)	Sweden Linn Persson; Mona Brorsson; Emma Nilsson; Hanna Öberg	1:11:07.1 (0+0) (0+1) (0+1) (0+2) (0+3) (0+0) (0+0) (0+1)	France Anaïs Chevalier; Julia Simon; Célia Aymonier; Anaïs Bescond	1:11:10.5 (0+2) (0+0) (0+1) (0+1) (0+2) (0+2) (0+1) (0+0)
Oberhof details	Russia Evgeniya Pavlova; Margarita Vasileva; Larisa Kuklina; Ekaterina Yurlova-Percht	1:18:46.3 (0+1) (0+3) (0+1) (0+0) (0+0) (0+0) (0+1) (0+2)	Germany Karolin Horchler; Franziska Hildebrand; Franziska Preuß; Denise Herrmann	1:19:19.8 (0+2) (0+1) (0+0) (0+0) (0+1) (0+3) (0+0) (2+3)	Czech Republic Lucie Charvátová; Veronika Vítková; Markéta Davidová; Eva Puskarčíková	1:19:23.0 (0+0) (1+3) (0+2) (0+0) (0+0) (0+0) (0+0) (0+1)
Ruhpolding details	France Julia Simon; Anaïs Bescond; Justine Braisaz; Anaïs Chevalier	1:09:27.7 (0+0) (0+0) (0+1) (0+0) (0+1) (0+1) (0+0) (0+1)	Norway Synnøve Solemdal; Ingrid Landmark Tandrevold; Tiril Eckhoff; Marte Olsbu Røiseland	1:09:39.2 (0+0) (0+0) (0+0) (0+3) (0+1) (0+0) (0+1) (0+2)	Germany Vanessa Hinz; Laura Dahlmeier; Franziska Preuß; Denise Herrmann	1:09:51.1 (0+1) (0+1) (0+1) (0+0) (0+0) (0+2) (0+1) (0+3)
Canmore details	Germany Vanessa Hinz; Franziska Hildebrand; Denise Herrmann; Laura Dahlmeier	1:10:16.3 (0+1) (0+0) (0+2) (0+1) (0+2) (0+1) (0+2) (1+3)	Norway Emilie Ågheim Kalkenberg; Ingrid Landmark Tandrevold; Tiril Eckhoff; Marte Olsbu Røiseland	1:10:46.5 (0+0) (2+3) (0+0) (0+1) (0+0) (0+1) (0+0) (0+2)	France Anaïs Chevalier; Justine Braisaz; Anaïs Bescond; Julia Simon	1:10:57.9 (0+2) (0+1) (0+0) (0+1) (0+1) (0+3) (0+3) (0+1)
World Championships details	Norway Synnøve Solemdal; Ingrid Landmark Tandrevold; Tiril Eckhoff; Marte Olsbu Røiseland	1:12:00.1 (0+2) (0+0) (0+0) (0+0) (0+2) (1+3) (0+1) (0+0)	Sweden Linn Persson; Mona Brorsson; Anna Magnusson; Hanna Öberg	1:12:24.4 (0+0) (0+0) (0+0) (0+1) (0+0) (0+0) (0+2) (0+3)	Ukraine Anastasiya Merkushyna; Vita Semerenko; Yuliia Dzhima; Valj Semerenko	1:12:35.2 (0+0) (0+0) (0+1) (0+0) (0+0) (0+2) (0+1) (0+1)

== Standings ==
#	Nation	HOC	OBE	RUH	CAN	ÖST	Total
1	Norway	38	43	54	54	60	249
2	Germany	36	54	48	60	43	241
3	France	48	40	60	48	34	230
4	Sweden	54	36	43	29	54	216
5	Italy	60	26	30	43	31	190
6	Russia	43	60	40	DSQ	40	183
7	Czech Republic	32	48	32	36	26	174
8	Ukraine	34	34	26	28	48	170
9	Belarus	40	32	34	26	30	162
10	Switzerland	29	31	31	40	28	159
11	United States	28	29	25	34	32	148
12	Slovakia	27	38	38	—	38	141
13	Estonia	26	24	27	32	29	138
14	Canada	25	28	29	24	27	133
15	Austria	31	DNF	36	38	25	130
16	Poland	30	30	28	DNS	36	124
17	China	22	25	23	30	24	124
18	Bulgaria	21	27	20	31	21	120
19	Japan	23	20	22	27	22	114
20	South Korea	20	23	19	25	20	107
21	Finland	24	21	24	—	19	88
22	Slovenia	—	22	21	—	18	61
23	Kazakhstan	—	—	—	—	23	23
24	Lithuania	19	—	—	—	—	19
