= 2018–19 Biathlon World Cup – Mixed Relay =

The 2018–19 Biathlon World Cup – Mixed Relay started on Sunday 2 December 2018 in Pokljuka and finished on Thursday 14 March 2019 in Östersund. The defending team was Germany.

The winning team was Norway.

== Competition format ==
The relay teams consist of four biathletes. Legs 1 and 2 are skied by the women, and legs 3 and 4 by the men. The women's legs are 6 kilometres (3.7 mi) and men's legs are 7.5 kilometres (4.7 mi). Every athlete's leg is skied over three laps, with two shooting rounds: one prone and one standing. For every round of five targets there are eight bullets available, though the last three can only be single-loaded manually from the spare round holders or from bullets deposited by the athlete into trays or onto the mat at the firing line. If after eight bullets there are still standing targets, one 150 metres (490 ft) penalty loop must be taken for each remaining target. The first-leg participants all start at the same time, and as in cross-country skiing relays, every athlete of a team must touch the team's next-leg participant to perform a valid changeover. On the first shooting stage of the first leg, the participant must shoot in the lane corresponding to their bib number (bib #10 shoots at lane #10 regardless of their position in the race), then for the remainder of the relay, the athletes shoot at the lane corresponding to the position they arrived (arrive at the range in 5th place, shoot at lane five).

The single mixed relay involves one male and one female biathlete each completing two legs consisting of one prone and one standing shoot. The female biathletes all start the race at the same time and complete one 6 kilometres (3.7 mi) leg before exchanging with their male counterparts who complete one 7.5 kilometres (4.7 mi) leg before exchanging again with the female skier who after completing another leg switches again with the male biathlete who completes the race. The rules regarding shooting are the same as in the regular mixed relay.

== 2017–18 Top 3 standings ==
Medal	Nation	Points
Gold:	Italy	188
Gold:	Norway	188
Bronze:	France	179

== Medal winners ==
Event	Gold	Time	Silver	Time	Bronze	Time
Pokljuka (SR) details	Norway Thekla Brun-Lie; Lars Helge Birkeland	38:26.7 (0+0) (0+2) (0+0) (0+1) (0+0) (0+0) (0+1) (0+0)	Austria Lisa Theresa Hauser; Simon Eder	38:35.2 (0+1) (0+2) (0+0) (0+1) (0+0) (0+1) (0+0) (0+0)	Ukraine Anastasiya Merkushyna; Artem Tyshchenko	38:47.4 (0+0) (0+0) (0+0) (0+0) (0+0) (0+0) (0+0) (0+1)
Pokljuka (MR) details	France Anaïs Bescond; Justine Braisaz; Martin Fourcade; Simon Desthieux	1:10:02.8 (0+2) (0+0) (0+1) (0+0) (0+0) (0+0) (0+0) (0+2)	Switzerland Elisa Gasparin; Lena Häcki; Benjamin Weger; Jeremy Finello	1:10:41.5 (0+1) (0+2) (0+0) (0+3) (0+0) (0+0) (0+1) (0+2)	Italy Lisa Vittozzi; Dorothea Wierer; Dominik Windisch; Lukas Hofer	1:10:54.9 (0+0) (0+0) (0+2) (0+0) (1+3) (0+2) (0+0) (0+1)
Soldier Hollow, Utah (SR) details	Italy Lukas Hofer; Dorothea Wierer	35:27.9 (0+1) (0+1) (0+1) (0+0) (0+1) (0+1) (0+1) (0+0)	Austria Simon Eder; Lisa Theresa Hauser	35:50.8 (0+0) (0+1) (0+0) (0+1) (0+0) (0+0) (0+0) (0+0)	France Antonin Guigonnat; Julia Simon	36:18.1 (0+1) (0+2) (0+1) (0+0) (0+1) (1+3) (0+0) (0+0)
Soldier Hollow, Utah (MR) details	France Quentin Fillon Maillet; Simon Desthieux; Célia Aymonier; Anaïs Chevalier	1:03:51.4 (0+0) (0+0) (0+0) (0+1) (0+0) (0+2) (0+0) (0+0)	Germany Erik Lesser; Benedikt Doll; Franziska Hildebrand; Vanessa Hinz	1:04:04.9 (0+1) (0+0) (0+1) (0+2) (0+0) (0+0) (0+1) (0+1)	Norway Vetle Sjåstad Christiansen; Johannes Thingnes Bø; Tiril Eckhoff; Marte Olsbu Røiseland	1:04:53.6 (0+0) (0+2) (0+0) (0+0) (0+3) (1+3) (0+0) (1+3)
World Championships (MR) details	Norway Marte Olsbu Røiseland; Tiril Eckhoff; Johannes Thingnes Bø; Vetle Sjåstad Christiansen	1:17:41.4 (0+1) (0+1) (0+2) (0+1) (0+0) (0+2) (0+0) (0+0)	Germany Vanessa Hinz; Denise Herrmann; Arnd Peiffer; Benedikt Doll	1:17:54.5 (0+0) (0+2) (0+0) (0+3) (0+1) (0+1) (0+0) (0+2)	Italy Lisa Vittozzi; Dorothea Wierer; Lukas Hofer; Dominik Windisch	1:18:51.0 (0+0) (0+0) (0+2) (0+2) (0+2) (0+3) (0+2) (0+3)
World Championships (SR) details	Norway Marte Olsbu Røiseland; Johannes Thingnes Bø	35:43.2 (0+1) (0+1) (0+0) (0+3) (0+1) (0+0) (0+0) (0+0)	Italy Dorothea Wierer; Lukas Hofer	35:56.6 (0+1) (0+0) (0+0) (0+2) (0+0) (0+1) (0+0) (0+1)	Sweden Hanna Öberg; Sebastian Samuelsson	36:03.2 (0+2) (0+0) (0+1) (0+2) (0+1) (0+0) (0+1) (0+1)

== Standings ==
#	Nation	POK SR	POK MR	SOL SR	SOL MR	ÖST MR	ÖST SR	Total
1	Norway	60	38	40	48	60	60	306
2	France	43	60	48	60	34	36	281
3	Italy	26	48	60	31	48	54	267
4	Germany	34	36	43	54	54	43	264
5	Sweden	40	34	36	40	40	48	238
6	Austria	54	25	54	36	24	34	227
7	Ukraine	48	32	38	28	36	40	222
8	Switzerland	22	54	26	43	30	27	202
9	Russia	36	43	30	DSQ	43	38	190
10	Czech Republic	31	27	24	38	38	32	190
11	Canada	38	31	29	30	25	26	179
12	Estonia	24	24	34	34	27	30	173
13	Japan	32	18	31	29	26	24	160
14	Belarus	25	29	28	23	28	25	158
15	United States	16	26	27	32	22	28	151
16	Bulgaria	23	30	23	26	20	22	144
17	Poland	27	22	32	DSQ	32	18	131
18	Kazakhstan	19	23	22	24	19	23	130
19	Finland	28	40	—	—	31	29	128
20	Lithuania	17	21	20	25	17	16	116
21	Slovenia	30	0	25	27	16	15	113
22	China	18	20	19	—	23	19	99
23	South Korea	20	19	—	—	21	21	81
24	Latvia	29	—	—	—	18	31	78
25	Slovakia	—	28	—	—	29	17	74
26	Romania	—	—	21	—	15	14	50
27	Moldova	21	—	—	—	—	20	41
28	Belgium	—	—	—	—	—	13	13
