= 2018–19 Biathlon World Cup – Individual Women =

The 2018–19 Biathlon World Cup – Individual Women started on 6 December 2018 in Pokljuka and finished on 12 March 2019 in Östersund. It was won by Lisa Vittozzi of Italy.

== Competition format ==
The individual race is the oldest biathlon event; the distance is skied over five laps. The biathlete shoots four times at any shooting lane, in the order of prone, standing, prone, standing, totalling 20 targets. Competitors' starts are staggered, normally by 30 seconds. The distance skied is usually 15 kilometres (9.3 mi) with a fixed penalty time of one minute per missed target that is added to the skiing time of the biathlete. In the "Short Individual" the distance is 12.5 kilometres (7.8 mi) with a penalty time of 45 seconds per missed target.

== 2017–18 Top 3 standings ==
Medal	Athlete	Points
Gold:	(Belarus) Nadezhda Skardino	96
Silver:	(Ukraine) Yuliia Dzhima	91
Bronze:	(Finland) Kaisa Mäkäräinen	84

== Medal winners ==
Event	Gold	Time	Silver	Time	Bronze	Time
Pokljuka details	Yuliia Dzhima; Ukraine	43:06.6 (0+0+0+0)	Monika Hojnisz; Poland	43:12.5 (0+0+0+1)	Markéta Davidová; Czech Republic	43:23.1 (0+0+0+1)
Canmore (Short Individual) details	Tiril Eckhoff; Norway	36:32.9 (0+1+0+0)	Markéta Davidová; Czech Republic	36:42.7 (0+0+0+0)	Lisa Vittozzi; Italy	36:53.8 (0+0+0+0)
World Championships details	Hanna Öberg; Sweden	43:10.4 (0+0+0+0)	Lisa Vittozzi; Italy	43:34.0 (0+0+0+0)	Justine Braisaz; France	43:42.9 (0+0+1+0)

== Standings ==
#	Name	POK IN	CAN SI	ÖST IN	Total
1	Lisa Vittozzi (ITA)	38	48	54	140
2	Paulína Fialková (SVK)	43	28	40	111
3	Markéta Davidová (CZE)	48	54	0	102
4	Hanna Öberg (SWE)	34	—	60	94
5	Lisa Theresa Hauser (AUT)	32	26	36	94
6	Dorothea Wierer (ITA)	36	20	34	90
7	Yuliia Dzhima (UKR)	60	0	29	89
8	Ingrid Landmark Tandrevold (NOR)	13	40	23	76
9	Laura Dahlmeier (GER)	—	32	43	75
10	Franziska Hildebrand (GER)	19	43	10	72
11	Vanessa Hinz (GER)	9	38	22	69
12	Monika Hojnisz (POL)	54	11	2	67
13	Marte Olsbu Røiseland (NOR)	20	29	18	67
14	Tiril Eckhoff (NOR)	—	60	4	64
15	Justine Braisaz (FRA)	0	14	48	62
16	Franziska Preuß (GER)	31	24	3	58
17	Anastasiya Merkushyna (UKR)	25	—	31	56
18	Anastasiya Kuzmina (SVK)	16	34	0	50
19	Elisa Gasparin (SUI)	0	30	20	50
20	Julia Schwaiger (AUT)	17	31	0	48
21	Yuliya Zhuravok (UKR)	21	0	27	48
22	Linn Persson (SWE)	22	—	26	48
23	Julia Simon (FRA)	8	23	17	48
24	Baiba Bendika (LAT)	40	3	0	43
25	Emma Nilsson (SWE)	23	—	19	42
26	Lena Häcki (SUI)	0	12	30	42
27	Anaïs Chevalier (FRA)	24	18	0	42
28	Susan Dunklee (USA)	30	—	11	41
29	Denise Herrmann (GER)	12	27	—	39
30	Mona Brorsson (SWE)	0	—	38	38
#	Name	POK IN	CAN SI	ÖST IN	Total
31	Celia Aymonier (FRA)	0	17	21	38
32	Anaïs Bescond (FRA)	0	36	—	36
33	Selina Gasparin (SUI)	—	—	32	32
34	Olena Pidhrushna (UKR)	26	6	—	32
35	Uliana Kaisheva (RUS)	7	25	0	32
36	Veronika Vítková (CZE)	3	0	28	31
37	Fuyuko Tachizaki (JPN)	1	22	7	30
38	Irina Starykh (RUS)	29	—	—	29
39	Valeriia Vasnetcova (RUS)	28	0	—	28
40	Iryna Kryuko (BLR)	27	—	0	27
41	Larisa Kuklina (RUS)	—	DNS	25	25
42	Ekaterina Yurlova-Percht (RUS)	0	—	24	24
43	Synnøve Solemdal (NOR)	2	10	12	24
44	Emilie Ågheim Kalkenberg (NOR)	0	21	—	21
45	Tuuli Tomingas (EST)	0	4	16	20
46	Regina Oja (EST)	0	19	0	19
47	Nadine Horchler (GER)	18	—	—	18
48	Megan Bankes (CAN)	0	16	0	16
49	Eva Puskarčíková (CZE)	15	0	0	15
50	Emma Lunder (CAN)	—	0	15	15
51	Iana Bondar (UKR)	—	15	—	15
52	Zhang Yan (CHN)	0	0	14	14
53	Ivona Fialková (SVK)	14	—	0	14
54	Johanna Talihärm (EST)	—	0	13	13
55	Rosanna Crawford (CAN)	0	13	0	13
56	Kaisa Mäkäräinen (FIN)	11	0	0	11
57	Evgeniya Pavlova (RUS)	10	—	—	10
58	Joanne Reid (USA)	—	0	9	9
59	Lucie Charvátová (CZE)	0	9	—	9
60	Sarah Beaudry (CAN)	—	8	0	8
#	Name	POK IN	CAN SI	ÖST IN	Total
61	Svetlana Mironova (RUS)	—	—	8	8
62	Caroline Colombo (FRA)	—	7	—	7
63	Christina Rieder (AUT)	—	0	6	6
64	Alexia Runggaldier (ITA)	6	0	0	6
65	Thekla Brun-Lie (NOR)	0	5	—	5
66	Venla Lehtonen (FIN)	5	—	0	5
67	Valj Semerenko (UKR)	—	—	5	5
68	Karolin Horchler (GER)	4	0	—	4
69	Leisan Biktasheva (RUS)	—	2	—	2
70	Tang Jialin (CHN)	0	0	1	1
71	Nadiia Bielkina (UKR)	—	1	—	1
