= Timur Khamitgatin =

Kazakhstani biathlete

Personal information
- Nationality: Kazakhstani
- Born: 27 April 1993 (age 33)

Sport
- Sport: Biathlon

Timur Khamitgatin (Тимур Хамзинович Хамитгатин, born 27 April 1993) is a Kazakhstani biathlete. He competed in the 2018 Winter Olympics.

== Biathlon results ==
All results are sourced from the International Biathlon Union.

=== Olympic Games ===
0 medals

Event	Individual	Sprint	Pursuit	Mass start	Relay	Mixed relay
(South Korea) 2018 Pyeongchang	72nd	—	—	—	—	—
