= Hwang Hye-suk =

South Korean biathlete (born 1993)

Personal information
- Nationality: South Korean
- Born: 5 August 1993 (age 32)

Sport
- Country: South Korea
- Sport: Biathlon

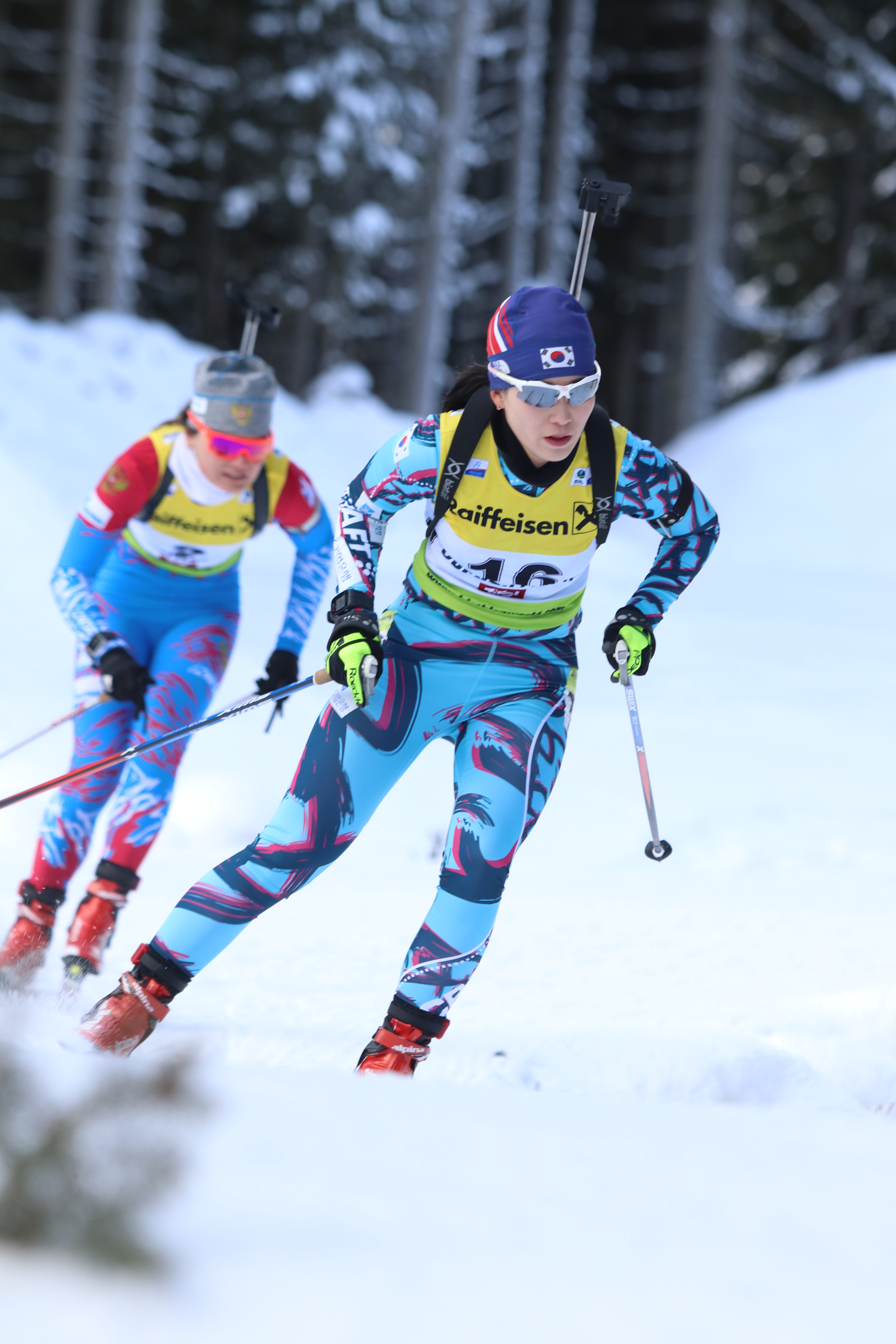
Hwang Hye-suk at the 2018 Super Sprint qualification in Obertilliach, Austria

Hwang Hye-suk (born 5 August 1993) is a South Korean biathlete. She represented South Korea at the Biathlon World Championships 2016.
