= 2018–19 Biathlon World Cup – Stage 1 =

2018–19 Biathlon World Cup Stage

The 2018–19 Biathlon World Cup – Stage 1 was the opening event of the season and was held in Pokljuka, Slovenia, from 2–9 December 2018.

== Schedule of events ==
The events took place at the following times.

Date	Time	Events
2 December	11:00 CET	6 km + 7.5 km Single Mixed Relay
2 December	13:35 CET	2 x 6 km + 2 x 7.5 km Mixed Relay
6 December	09:15 CET	Men's 20 km Individual
6 December	13:15 CET	Women's 15 km Individual
7 December	13:15 CET	Men's 10 km Sprint
8 December	13:15 CET	Women's 7.5 km Sprint
9 December	10:45 CET	Men's 12.5 km Pursuit
9 December	13:45 CET	Women's 10 km Pursuit

== Medal winners ==
=== Men ===
Event:	Gold:	Time	Silver:	Time	Bronze:	Time
20 km Individual	Martin Fourcade; France	47:09.2 (0+0+0+0)	Johannes Kühn; Germany	47:13.4 (0+0+0+0)	Simon Eder; Austria	47:28.9 (0+0+0+0)
10 km Sprint	Johannes Thingnes Bø; Norway	23:46.3 (0+1)	Antonin Guigonnat; France	24:02.4 (0+0)	Alexander Loginov; Russia	24:02.7 (0+0)
12.5 km Pursuit	Johannes Thingnes Bø; Norway	30:20.4 (1+0+0+2)	Quentin Fillon Maillet; France	30:20.5 (0+0+0+0)	Alexander Loginov; Russia	30:22.3 (0+0+1+0)

=== Women ===
Event:	Gold:	Time	Silver:	Time	Bronze:	Time
15 km Individual	Yuliia Dzhima; Ukraine	43:06.6 (0+0+0+0)	Monika Hojnisz; Poland	43:12.5 (0+0+0+1)	Markéta Davidová; Czech Republic	43:23.1 (0+0+0+1)
7.5 km Sprint	Kaisa Mäkäräinen; Finland	20:08.1 (0+0)	Dorothea Wierer; Italy	20:22.9 (0+0)	Justine Braisaz; France	20:50.2 (0+0)
10 km Pursuit	Kaisa Mäkäräinen; Finland	29:16.9 (0+0+0+0)	Dorothea Wierer; Italy	29:58.2 (0+0+0+0)	Paulína Fialková; Slovakia	30:16.1 (0+0+0+0)

=== Mixed ===
Event:	Gold:	Time	Silver:	Time	Bronze:	Time
6 km + 7.5 km Single Mixed Relay	Norway; Thekla Brun-Lie; Lars Helge Birkeland	38:26.7 (0+0) (0+2) (0+0) (0+1) (0+0) (0+0) (0+1) (0+0)	Austria; Lisa Hauser; Simon Eder	38:35.2 (0+1) (0+2) (0+0) (0+1) (0+0) (0+1) (0+0) (0+0)	Ukraine; Anastasiya Merkushyna; Artem Tyshchenko	38:47.4 (0+0) (0+0) (0+0) (0+0) (0+0) (0+0) (0+0) (0+1)
2 x 6 km + 2 x 7.5 km Mixed Relay	France; Anaïs Bescond; Justine Braisaz; Martin Fourcade; Simon Desthieux	1:10:02.8 (0+2) (0+0) (0+1) (0+0) (0+0) (0+0) (0+0) (0+2)	Switzerland; Elisa Gasparin; Lena Häcki; Benjamin Weger; Jeremy Finello	1:10:41.5 (0+1) (0+2) (0+0) (0+3) (0+0) (0+0) (0+1) (0+2)	Italy; Lisa Vittozzi; Dorothea Wierer; Dominik Windisch; Lukas Hofer	1:10:54.9 (0+0) (0+0) (0+2) (0+0) (1+3) (0+2) (0+0) (0+1)

== Achievements ==
Best individual performance for all time

- Johannes Kühn (GER), 2nd place in Individual
- Antonin Guigonnat (FRA), 2nd place in Sprint
- Sindre Pettersen (NOR), 6th place in Sprint
- Sebastian Samuelsson (SWE), 9th place in Individual
- Jesper Nelin (SWE), 13th place in Individual
- Scott Gow (CAN), 14th place in Individual
- Christian Gow (CAN), 14th place in Pursuit
- Felix Leitner (AUT), 17th place in Individual
- Martin Ponsiluoma (SWE), 18th place in Individual
- Mikito Tachizaki (JPN), 24th place in Individual
- Karol Dombrovski (LTU), 25th place in Individual
- Philipp Horn (GER), 28th place in Pursuit
- Thierry Chenal (ITA), 32nd place in Sprint
- Eduard Latypov (RUS), 41st place in Pursuit
- Andrzej Nędza-Kubiniec (POL), 48th place in Individual
- Saverio Zini (ITA), 72nd place in Sprint
- Jaakko Ranta (FIN), 83rd place in Individual
- Dujin Choi (KOR), 91st place in Individual
- Travis Cooper (USA), 103rd place in Sprint
- Yuliia Dzhima (UKR), 1st place in Individual
- Monika Hojnisz (POL), 2nd place in Individual
- Markéta Davidová (CZE), 3rd place in Individual
- Julia Simon (FRA), 4th place in Sprint
- Clare Egan (USA), 6th place in Pursuit
- Evgeniya Pavlova (RUS), 8th place in Sprint
- Anna Weidel (GER), 10th place in Sprint
- Valeria Vasnetcova (RUS), 13th place in Individual
- Margarita Vasileva (RUS), 13th place in Sprint
- Emma Nilsson (SWE), 18th place in Individual
- Venla Lehtonen (FIN), 36th place in Individual
- Yelizaveta Belchenko (KAZ), 47th place in Pursuit
- Emilie Aagheim Kalkenberg (NOR), 48th place in Pursuit
- Anastassiya Kondratyeva (KAZ), 66th place in Sprint
- Asuka Hachisuka (JPN), 84th place in Sprint
- Jenny Fellman (FIN), 91st place in Sprint

First individual World Cup race

- Sindre Pettersen (NOR), 44th place in Individual
- Mihail Usov (MDA), 62nd place in Individual
- Philipp Horn (GER), 77th place in Individual
- Yang Xingyuan (CHN), 95th place in Individual
- Kristiyan Stoyanov (BUL), 97th place in Sprint
- Eduard Latypov (RUS), 99th place in Individual
- Raul Antonio Flore (ROU), 100th place in Sprint
- Zhu Zhenyu (CHN), 104th place in Sprint
- Travis Cooper (USA), 105th place in Individual
- Saverio Zini (ITA), 106th place in Individual
- Evgeniya Pavlova (RUS), 31st place in Individual
- Margarita Vasileva (RUS), 42nd place in Individual
- Irina Kruchinkina (BLR), 44th place in Individual
- Anna Weidel (GER), 66th place in Individual
- Karoline Offigstad Knotten (NOR), 75th place in Sprint
- Lea Einfalt (SLO), 77th place in Individual
- Lyudmila Akhatova (KAZ), 87th place in Individual
- Asuka Hachisuka (JPN), 99th place in Individual
- Jenny Fellman (FIN), 101st place in Individual
