= 2018–19 Biathlon World Cup – Stage 2 =

2018–19 Biathlon World Cup Stage

The 2018–19 Biathlon World Cup – Stage 2 was the second event of the season and was held in Hochfilzen, Austria, from 13 to 16 December 2018.

== Schedule of events ==
The events took place at the following times.

Date	Time	Events
13 December	14:15 CET	Women's 7.5 km Sprint
14 December	14:15 CET	Men's 10 km Sprint
15 December	11:30 CET	Women's 10 km Pursuit
15 December	14:45 CET	Men's 12.5 km Pursuit
16 December	11:15 CET	4 x 6 km Women's Relay
16 December	14:00 CET	4 x 7.5 km Men's Relay

== Medal winners ==
=== Men ===
Event:	Gold:	Time	Silver:	Time	Bronze:	Time
10 km Sprint	Johannes Thingnes Bø; Norway	24:49.2 (0+1)	Martin Fourcade; France	24:57.8 (0+0)	Benedikt Doll; Germany	24:59.4 (0+0)
12.5 km Pursuit	Martin Fourcade; France	32:22.3 (0+0+0+0)	Arnd Peiffer; Germany	32:36.0 (1+0+0+0)	Vetle Sjåstad Christiansen; Norway	32:38.4 (0+0+0+0)
4 x 7,5 km Men Relay	Sweden; Peppe Femling; Martin Ponsiluoma; Torstein Stenersen; Sebastian Samuelsson	1:16:10.6 (0+0) (0+0) (0+2) (0+1) (0+0) (0+0) (0+0) (0+2)	Norway; Lars Helge Birkeland; Henrik L'Abée-Lund; Tarjei Bø; Vetle Sjåstad Christiansen	1:16:14.2 (0+0) (0+0) (0+1) (0+3) (0+0) (0+2) (0+1) (0+0)	Germany; Simon Schempp; Johannes Kühn; Arnd Peiffer; Benedikt Doll	1:16:39.4 (0+2) (0+0) (0+0) (1+3) (0+0) (0+0) (0+0) (0+1)

=== Women ===
Event:	Gold:	Time	Silver:	Time	Bronze:	Time
7.5 km Sprint	Dorothea Wierer; Italy	21:04.9 (0+1)	Kaisa Mäkäräinen; Finland	21:05.5 (0+1)	Ekaterina Yurlova-Percht; Russia	21:29.3 (0+0)
10 km Pursuit	Kaisa Mäkäräinen; Finland	30:53.1 (1+0+1+1)	Paulína Fialková; Slovakia	30:54.6 (0+0+1+1)	Dorothea Wierer; Italy	30:55.9 (2+0+1+1)
4 x 6 km Women Relay	Italy; Lisa Vittozzi; Alexia Runggaldier; Dorothea Wierer; Federica Sanfilippo	1:10:58.7 (0+0) (0+1) (0+0) (0+2) (0+0) (0+0) (0+0) (0+0)	Sweden; Linn Persson; Mona Brorsson; Emma Nilsson; Hanna Öberg	1:11:07.1 (0+0) (0+1) (0+1) (0+2) (0+3) (0+0) (0+0) (0+1)	France; Anaïs Chevalier; Julia Simon; Célia Aymonier; Anaïs Bescond	1:11:10.5 (0+2) (0+0) (0+1) (0+1) (0+2) (0+2) (0+0) (0+1)
