= 2018–19 Biathlon World Cup – Stage 9 =

The 2018–19 Biathlon World Cup – Stage 9 was the 9th and final event of the season and was held in Oslo, Holmenkollen, Norway, from 21–24 March 2019.

== Schedule of events ==
The events took place at the following times.

Date	Time	Events
21 March	16:30 CET	Women's 7.5 km Sprint
22 March	16:15 CET	Men's 10 km Sprint
23 March	15:00 CET	Women's 10 km Pursuit
23 March	17:15 CET	Men's 12.5 km Pursuit
24 March	13:45 CET	Women's 12.5 km Mass Start
24 March	16:30 CET	Men's 15 km Mass Start

== Medal winners ==
=== Men ===
Event:	Gold:	Time	Silver:	Time	Bronze:	Time
10 km Sprint	Johannes Thingnes Bø; Norway	24:39.9 (0+1)	Lukas Hofer; Italy	25:11.6 (0+0)	Quentin Fillon Maillet; France	25:14.9 (0+0)
12.5 km Pursuit	Johannes Thingnes Bø; Norway	32:15.6 (0+2+0+1)	Tarjei Bø; Norway	32:29.5 (0+0+0+1)	Arnd Peiffer; Germany	32:33.8 (0+0+1+0)
15 km Mass Start	Johannes Thingnes Bø; Norway	37:25.6 (0+0+0+0)	Arnd Peiffer; Germany	37:44.8 (0+0+0+0)	Benedikt Doll; Germany	38:03.6 (1+0+0+1)

=== Women ===
Event:	Gold:	Time	Silver:	Time	Bronze:	Time
7.5 km Sprint	Anastasiya Kuzmina; Slovakia	19:56.2 (1+0)	Franziska Preuß; Germany	20:17.4 (0+0)	Paulína Fialková; Slovakia	20:21.3 (0+0)
10 km Pursuit	Anastasiya Kuzmina; Slovakia	28:25.9 (0+0+0+0)	Denise Herrmann; Germany	30:08.7 (1+0+0+1)	Hanna Öberg; Sweden	30:27.0 (0+0+0+1)
12.5 km Mass Start	Hanna Öberg; Sweden	35:56.2 (0+0+1+1)	Tiril Eckhoff; Norway	35:57.5 (0+0+2+1)	Clare Egan; United States	36:06.6 (0+0+0+1)
