= Clare Egan =

American biathlete (born 1987)

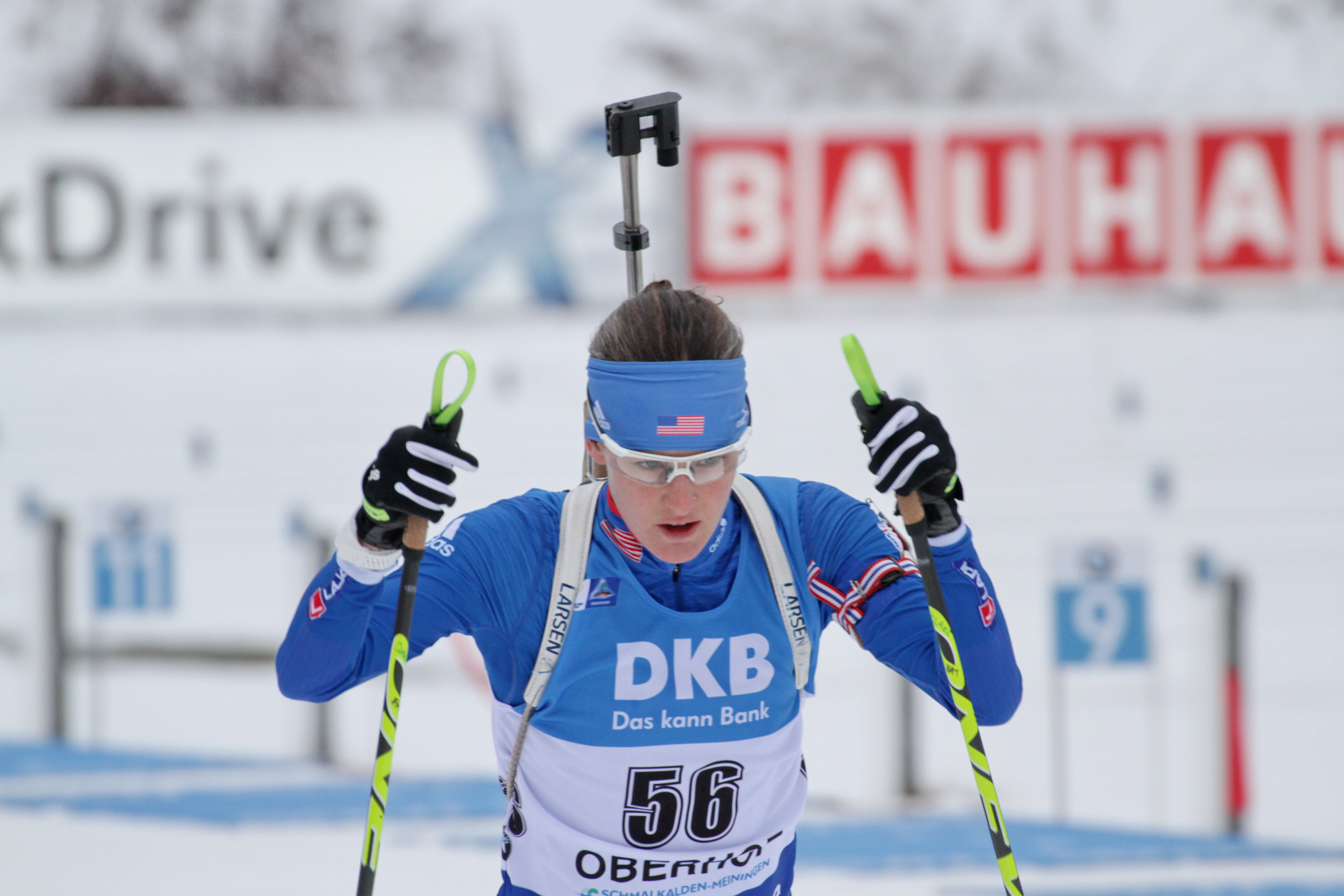
- Egan during World Cup competitions in Oberhof, Thuringia, Germany, in January 2018

Personal information
- Native name: Lauren Clare Egan
- Born: November 19, 1987 (age 38) Cape Elizabeth, Maine
- Years active: 2013–2022

Sport
- Country: United States
- Sport: Biathlon
- Club: Craftsbury green racing project
- Now coaching: U.S. Biathlon Team Personal coach:

Laurent Clare Egan (born November 19, 1987) is an American retired biathlete. She has represented the United States in World Cup Biathlon from 2015 through the 2018–2019 season and at the 2018 Winter Olympics in PyeongChang. She was elected in 2018 to chair the International Biathlon Union Athletes’ Committee until 2022.

Egan represented the United States at the 2022 Winter Olympics.

== Life ==
Egan is originally from Cape Elizabeth, Maine. She was a stand-out runner and skier at Cape Elizabeth High School, from which she graduated in 2006. Egan attended Wellesley College and received a master's degree from the University of New Hampshire; she speaks six languages.

Egan was an NCAA Division III All-American runner for the Wellesley Blue track and field team, placing 6th in the 1500 meters at the 2010 NCAA Division III women's outdoor track and field championships. She also competed in cross country running for the team.

== Biathlon results ==
All results are sourced from the International Biathlon Union.

=== Olympic Games ===
0 medals

Event	Individual	Sprint	Pursuit	Mass Start	Relay	Mixed Relay
(South Korea) 2018 Pyeongchang	62nd	61st	—	—	13th	—
(China) 2022 Beijing	39th	46th	38th	—	11th	7th

=== World Championships ===
0 medals

Event	Individual	Sprint	Pursuit	Mass start	Relay	Mixed relay	Single mixed relay
(Finland) 2015 Kontiolahti	51st	40th	52nd	—	12th	—	—N/a
(Norway) 2016 Oslo	66th	84th	—	—	13th	—	—N/a
(Austria) 2017 Hochfilzen	22nd	20th	41st	24th	14th	16th	—N/a
(Sweden) 2019 Östersund	53rd	11th	12th	26th	9th	19th	—
(Italy) 2020 Antholz	58th	28th	46th	—	15th	13th	—
(Slovenia) 2021 Pokljuka	39th	54th	44th	—	13th	22nd	12th

*During Olympic seasons competitions are only held for those events not included in the Olympic program.
**The single mixed relay was added as an event in 2019.
