= 2018–19 Biathlon World Cup – Stage 8 =

2018–19 Biathlon World Cup Stage

The 2018–19 Biathlon World Cup – Stage 8 was the eighth event of the season and was held in Salt Lake City, United States, from 14–17 February 2019.

== Schedule of events ==
The events took place at the following times.

Date	Time	Events
14 February	19:15 CET	Women's 7.5 km Sprint
15 February	19:15 CET	Men's 10 km Sprint
16 February	18:10 CET	Women's 10 km Pursuit
16 February	22:10 CET	Men's 12.5 km Pursuit
17 February	18:10 CET	6 km + 7.5 km Single Mixed Relay
17 February	22:05 CET	2 x 6 km + 2 x 7.5 km Mixed Relay

== Medal winners ==
=== Men ===
Event:	Gold:	Time	Silver:	Time	Bronze:	Time
10 km Sprint	Vetle Sjåstad Christiansen; Norway	23:29.7 (0+0)	Simon Desthieux; France	23:31.0 (1+0)	Roman Rees; Germany	23:52.1 (0+1)
12.5 km Pursuit	Quentin Fillon Maillet; France	30:55.8 (0+0+0+0)	Vetle Sjåstad Christiansen; Norway	31:21.7 (0+1+0+0)	Simon Desthieux; France	31:43.1 (0+1+1+1)

=== Women ===
Event:	Gold:	Time	Silver:	Time	Bronze:	Time
7.5 km Sprint	Marte Olsbu Røiseland; Norway	19:47.6 (0+0)	Kaisa Mäkäräinen; Finland	19:59.1 (0+1)	Franziska Hildebrand; Germany	20:09.0 (0+0)
10 km Pursuit	Denise Herrmann; Germany	28:03.4 (0+0+1+1)	Franziska Hildebrand; Germany	28:07.6 (0+0+0+1)	Kaisa Mäkäräinen; Finland	28:19.9 (2+0+1+0)

=== Mixed ===
Event:	Gold:	Time	Silver:	Time	Bronze:	Time
7.5 km + 6 km Single Mixed Relay	Italy; Lukas Hofer; Dorothea Wierer	35:27.9 (0+1) (0+1) (0+1) (0+0) (0+1) (0+1) (0+1) (0+0)	Austria; Simon Eder; Lisa Hauser	35:50.8 (0+0) (0+1) (0+0) (0+1) (0+0) (0+0) (0+0) (0+0)	France; Antonin Guigonnat; Julia Simon	36:18.1 (0+1) (0+2) (0+1) (0+0) (0+1) (1+3) (0+0) (0+0)
2 x 7.5 km + 2 x 6 km Mixed Relay	France; Quentin Fillon Maillet; Simon Desthieux; Célia Aymonier; Anaïs Chevalier	1:03:51.42 (0+0) (0+0) (0+0) (0+1) (0+0) (0+2) (0+0) (0+0)	Germany; Erik Lesser; Benedikt Doll; Franziska Hildebrand; Vanessa Hinz	1:04:04.97 (0+1) (0+0) (0+1) (0+2) (0+0) (0+0) (0+1) (0+1)	Norway; Vetle Sjåstad Christiansen; Johannes Thingnes Bø; Tiril Eckhoff; Marte Olsbu Røiseland	1:04:53.66 (0+0) (0+2) (0+0) (0+0) (0+3) (1+3) (0+0) (1+3)
