= 2018–19 Biathlon World Cup – Stage 3 =

2018–19 Biathlon World Cup Stage

The 2018–19 Biathlon World Cup – Stage 3 was the third event of the season and was held in Nové Město, Czech Republic, from 20–23 December 2018.

== Schedule of events ==
The events took place at the following times.

Date	Time	Events
20 December	17:30 CET	Men's 10 km Sprint
21 December	17:30 CET	Women's 7.5 km Sprint
22 December	15:00 CET	Men's 12.5 km Pursuit
22 December	17:00 CET	Women's 10 km Pursuit
23 December	11:45 CET	Men's 15 km Mass Start
23 December	14:30 CET	Women's 12.5 km Mass Start

== Medal winners ==
=== Men ===
Event:	Gold:	Time	Silver:	Time	Bronze:	Time
10 km Sprint	Johannes Thingnes Bø; Norway	23:09.9 (0+0)	Alexandr Loginov; Russia	23:30.9 (0+0)	Martin Ponsiluoma; Sweden	24:04.1 (0+0)
12.5 km Pursuit	Johannes Thingnes Bø; Norway	31:59.0 (1+0+2+1)	Alexandr Loginov; Russia	32:05.2 (1+1+1+1)	Tarjei Bø; Norway	32:22.9 (0+0+0+1)
15 km Mass Start	Johannes Thingnes Bø; Norway	37:25.2 (0+0+0+0)	Quentin Fillon Maillet; France	38:11.7 (0+0+1+1)	Evgeniy Garanichev; Russia	38:19.3 (0+0+0+0)

=== Women ===
Event:	Gold:	Time	Silver:	Time	Bronze:	Time
7.5 km Sprint	Marte Olsbu Røiseland; Norway	19:44.6 (0+0)	Laura Dahlmeier; Germany	19:49.1 (0+1)	Paulína Fialková; Slovakia	19:50.8 (0+0)
10 km Pursuit	Marte Olsbu Røiseland; Norway	29:53.5 (0+0+1+1)	Dorothea Wierer; Italy	29:53.7 (0+0+0+1)	Hanna Öberg; Sweden	29:58.2 (0+0+0+1)
12.5 km Mass Start	Anastasiya Kuzmina; Slovakia	35:34.4 (1+0+0+1)	Paulína Fialková; Slovakia	35:46.5 (0+0+1+1)	Anaïs Chevalier; France	35:47.7 (1+1+1+0)
