= 2018–19 Biathlon World Cup – Stage 4 =

The 2018–19 Biathlon World Cup – Stage 4 was the fourth event of the season and was held in Oberhof, Germany, from 10–13 January 2019.

== Schedule of events ==
The events took place at the following times.

Date	Time	Events
10 January	14:30 CET	Women's 7.5 km Sprint
11 January	14:30 CET	Men's 10 km Sprint
12 January	13:45 CET	Women's 10 km Pursuit
12 January	15:00 CET	Men's 12.5 km Pursuit
13 January	11:45 CET	4 x 6 km Women's Relay
13 January	14:30 CET	4 x 7.5 km Men's Relay

== Medal winners ==
=== Men ===
Event:	Gold:	Time	Silver:	Time	Bronze:	Time
10 km Sprint	Alexandr Loginov; Russia	25:50.9 (0+0)	Johannes Thingnes Bø; Norway	26:16.1 (0+1)	Sebastian Samuelsson; Sweden	26:27.7 (0+0)
12.5 km Pursuit	Johannes Thingnes Bø; Norway	34:29.8 (0+1+1+1)	Arnd Peiffer; Germany	34:44.9 (1+0+0+0)	Lukas Hofer; Italy	34:45.6 (0+0+0+0)
4 x 7,5 km Men Relay	Russia Maxim Tsvetkov; Evgeniy Garanichev; Dmitry Malyshko; Alexandr Loginov	1:20:54.3 (0+0) (0+0) (0+0) (0+0) (0+1) (0+1) (0+2) (0+2)	France Antonin Guigonnat; Simon Desthieux; Quentin Fillon Maillet; Martin Fourcade	1:21:55.4 (0+1) (0+1) (0+0) (1+3) (0+3) (0+0) (0+0) (0+0)	Austria Tobias Eberhard; Simon Eder; Dominik Landertinger; Julian Eberhard	1:23:12.9 (0+0) (1+3) (0+0) (0+0) (0+0) (0+1) (0+1) (0+2)

=== Women ===
Event:	Gold:	Time	Silver:	Time	Bronze:	Time
7.5 km Sprint	Lisa Vittozzi; Italy	22:34.6 (0+0)	Anaïs Chevalier; France	22:39.9 (0+0)	Hanna Öberg; Sweden	22:49.6 (0+0)
10 km Pursuit	Lisa Vittozzi; Italy	32:32.9 (0+1+1+0)	Anastasiya Kuzmina; Slovakia	32:47.4 (2+1+1+0)	Anaïs Chevalier; France	33:00.8 (2+1+2+0)
4 x 6 km Women Relay	Russia Evgeniya Pavlova; Margarita Vasileva; Larisa Kuklina; Ekaterina Yurlova-Percht	1:18:46.3 (0+1) (0+3) (0+1) (0+0) (0+0) (0+0) (0+1) (0+2)	Germany Karolin Horchler; Franziska Hildebrand; Franziska Preuß; Denise Herrmann	1:19:19.8 (0+2) (0+1) (0+0) (0+0) (0+1) (0+3) (0+0) (2+3)	Czech Republic Lucie Charvátová; Veronika Vítková; Markéta Davidová; Eva Puskarčíková	1:19:23.0 (0+0) (1+3) (0+2) (0+0) (0+0) (0+0) (0+0) (0+1)
