= 2018–19 Biathlon World Cup – Stage 7 =

The 2018–19 Biathlon World Cup – Stage 7 was the seventh event of the season and was held in Canmore, Canada, from 7–10 February 2019.

== Schedule of events ==
The events took place at the following times.

Date	Time	Events
7 February	20:20 CET	Men's 15 km Individual (Note: Due to poor weather conditions, the individual events were shortened to 15 km for the men and 12.5 km for the women. Both events were held under the short individual rules.)
7 February	22:55 CET	Women's 12.5 km Individual
8 February	20:30 CET	Men's 4 x 7.5 km Relay
8 February	22:45 CET	Women's 4 x 6 km Relay
10 February	20:20 CET	Men's 10 km Sprint (Note: Both sprint events for men and women were cancelled due to bad weather conditions.)
10 February	22:45 CET	Women's 7.5 km Sprint

== Medal winners ==
=== Men ===
Event:	Gold:	Time	Silver:	Time	Bronze:	Time
15 km Individual	Johannes Thingnes Bø; Norway	35:27.9 (0+0+0+0)	Vetle Sjåstad Christiansen; Norway	37:38.1 (1+0+0+1)	Alexandr Loginov; Russia	38:08.9 (1+1+0+0)
4 x 7.5 km Relay	Norway Lars Helge Birkeland; Vetle Sjåstad Christiansen; Erlend Bjøntegaard; Johannes Thingnes Bø	1:16:36.6 (0+1) (0+1) (0+1) (0+1) (0+1) (0+2) (0+0) (0+0)	France Antonin Guigonnat; Emilien Jacquelin; Simon Fourcade; Quentin Fillon Maillet	1:17:47.0 (0+2) (0+0) (0+0) (0+1) (0+0) (0+1) (0+1) (0+3)	Russia Evgeniy Garanichev; Eduard Latypov; Alexandr Loginov; Alexander Povarnitsyn	1:18:25.0 (0+0) (0+3) (0+0) (0+0) (0+2) (0+2) (0+0) (0+2)
10 km Sprint; Cancelled	Due to the cold weather the competition was cancelled					

=== Women ===
Event:	Gold:	Time	Silver:	Time	Bronze:	Time
12.5 km Individual	Tiril Eckhoff; Norway	36:32.9 (0+1+0+0)	Markéta Davidová; Czech Republic	36:42.7 (0+0+0+0)	Lisa Vittozzi; Italy	36:53.8 (0+0+0+0)
4 x 6 km Relay	Germany Vanessa Hinz; Franziska Hildebrand; Denise Herrmann; Laura Dahlmeier	1:10:16.3 (0+1) (0+0) (0+2) (0+1) (0+2) (0+1) (0+2) (1+3)	Norway Emilie Aagheim Kalkenberg; Ingrid Landmark Tandrevold; Tiril Eckhoff; Marte Olsbu Røiseland	1:10:46.5 (0+0) (2+3) (0+0) (0+1) (0+0) (0+1) (0+0) (0+2)	France Anaïs Chevalier; Justine Braisaz; Anaïs Bescond; Julia Simon	1:10:57.9 (0+2) (0+1) (0+0) (0+1) (0+1) (0+3) (0+3) (0+1)
7.5 km Sprint; Cancelled	Due to the cold weather the competition was cancelled					
