= 2018–19 Biathlon World Cup – Stage 5 =

The 2018–19 Biathlon World Cup – Stage 5 was the fifth event of the season and was held in Ruhpolding, Germany, from 17–20 January 2019.

== Schedule of events ==
The events took place at the following times.

Date	Time	Events
17 January	11:00 CET	Men's 10 km Sprint
17 January	14:30 CET	Women's 7.5 km Sprint
18 January	14:30 CET	4 x 7.5 km Men's Relay
19 January	14:30 CET	4 x 6 km Women's Relay
20 January	12:15 CET	Men's 15 km Mass Start
20 January	14:40 CET	Women's 12.5 km Mass Start

== Medal winners ==
=== Men ===
Event:	Gold:	Time	Silver:	Time	Bronze:	Time
10 km Sprint	Johannes Thingnes Bø; Norway	22:56.3 (0+1)	Tarjei Bø; Norway	23:04.2 (0+0)	Benedikt Doll; Germany	23:06.8 (0+1)
4 x 7.5 km Men Relay	Norway Lars Helge Birkeland; Vetle Sjåstad Christiansen; Tarjei Bø; Johannes Thingnes Bø	1:09:54.3 (0+1) (0+1) (0+0) (0+1) (0+0) (0+2) (0+0) (0+3)	Germany Roman Rees; Johannes Kühn; Arnd Peiffer; Benedikt Doll	1:10:07.8 (0+0) (0+0) (0+1) (0+3) (0+0) (0+0) (0+1) (0+1)	France Emilien Jacquelin; Martin Fourcade; Quentin Fillon Maillet; Simon Desthieux	1:10:20.5 (0+1) (0+1) (0+1) (0+0) (0+2) (0+2) (0+0) (0+2)
15 km Mass Start	Johannes Thingnes Bø; Norway	36:43.8 (0+0+0+1)	Julian Eberhard; Austria	36:44.4 (0+1+0+1)	Quentin Fillon Maillet; France	36:46.6 (0+1+0+0)

=== Women ===
Event:	Gold:	Time	Silver:	Time	Bronze:	Time
7.5 km Sprint	Anastasiya Kuzmina; Slovakia	19:15.1 (0+0)	Lisa Vittozzi; Italy	19:26.6 (0+0)	Hanna Öberg; Sweden	19:44.2 (0+0)
4 x 6 km Women Relay	France Julia Simon; Anaïs Bescond; Justine Braisaz; Anaïs Chevalier	1:09:27.7 (0+0) (0+0) (0+1) (0+0) (0+1) (0+1) (0+0) (0+1)	Norway Synnøve Solemdal; Ingrid Landmark Tandrevold; Tiril Eckhoff; Marte Olsbu Røiseland	1:09:39.2 (0+0) (0+0) (0+0) (0+3) (0+1) (0+0) (0+1) (0+2)	Germany Vanessa Hinz; Laura Dahlmeier; Franziska Preuß; Denise Herrmann	1:09:51.1 (0+1) (0+1) (0+1) (0+0) (0+0) (0+2) (0+1) (0+3)
12.5 km Mass Start	Franziska Preuß; Germany	32:34.0 (0+0+0+0)	Ingrid Landmark Tandrevold; Norway	32:34.2 (0+0+0+0)	Paulína Fialková; Slovakia	32:49.1 (0+0+1+0)
