= 2018–19 Biathlon World Cup – Stage 6 =

2018–19 Biathlon World Cup held in Antholz-Anterselva, Italy

The 2018–19 Biathlon World Cup – Stage 6 was the sixth event of the season and was held in Antholz-Anterselva, Italy, from 24 to 27 January 2019.

== Schedule of events ==
The events took place at the following times.

| Date | Time | Events |
|---|---|---|
| 24 January | 14:30 CET | Women's 7.5 km Sprint |
| 25 January | 14:30 CET | Men's 10 km Sprint |
| 26 January | 13:30 CET | Women's 10 km Pursuit |
| 26 January | 15:30 CET | Men's 12.5 km Pursuit |
| 27 January | 12:45 CET | Women's 12.5 km Mass Start |
| 27 January | 15:30 CET | Men's 15 km Mass Start |

== Medal winners ==
=== Men ===
| Event: | Gold: | Time | Silver: | Time | Bronze: | Time |
|---|---|---|---|---|---|---|
| 10 km Sprint | Johannes Thingnes Bø; Norway | 23:53.9 (0+1) | Erlend Bjøntegaard; Norway | 24:11.4 (0+0) | Antonin Guigonnat; France | 24:14.1 (0+1) |
| 12.5 km Pursuit | Johannes Thingnes Bø; Norway | 31:33.7 (1+1+0+1) | Antonin Guigonnat; France | 32:08.5 (0+0+1+0) | Quentin Fillon Maillet; France | 32:14.3 (1+0+0+1) |
| 15 km Mass Start | Quentin Fillon Maillet; France | 34:39.4 (0+0+0+0) | Johannes Thingnes Bø; Norway | 34:53.7 (0+0+1+1) | Arnd Peiffer; Germany | 35:04.0 (0+0+0+0) |

=== Women ===
| Event: | Gold: | Time | Silver: | Time | Bronze: | Time |
|---|---|---|---|---|---|---|
| 7.5 km Sprint | Markéta Davidová; Czech Republic | 21:40.7 (0+0) | Kaisa Mäkäräinen; Finland | 21:42.4 (0+1) | Marte Olsbu Røiseland; Norway | 21:44.2 (1+0) |
| 10 km Pursuit | Dorothea Wierer; Italy | 29:20.1 (1+0+0+1) | Laura Dahlmeier; Germany | 29:26.1 (0+0+1+0) | Lisa Vittozzi; Italy | 29:36.3 (1+0+0+1) |
| 12.5 km Mass Start | Laura Dahlmeier; Germany | 35:32.8 (1+0+0+0) | Markéta Davidová; Czech Republic | 35:45.9 (0+0+1+0) | Vanessa Hinz; Germany | 35:49.2 (1+0+0+0) |
