= Jeremy Finello =

Swiss biathlete (born 1992)

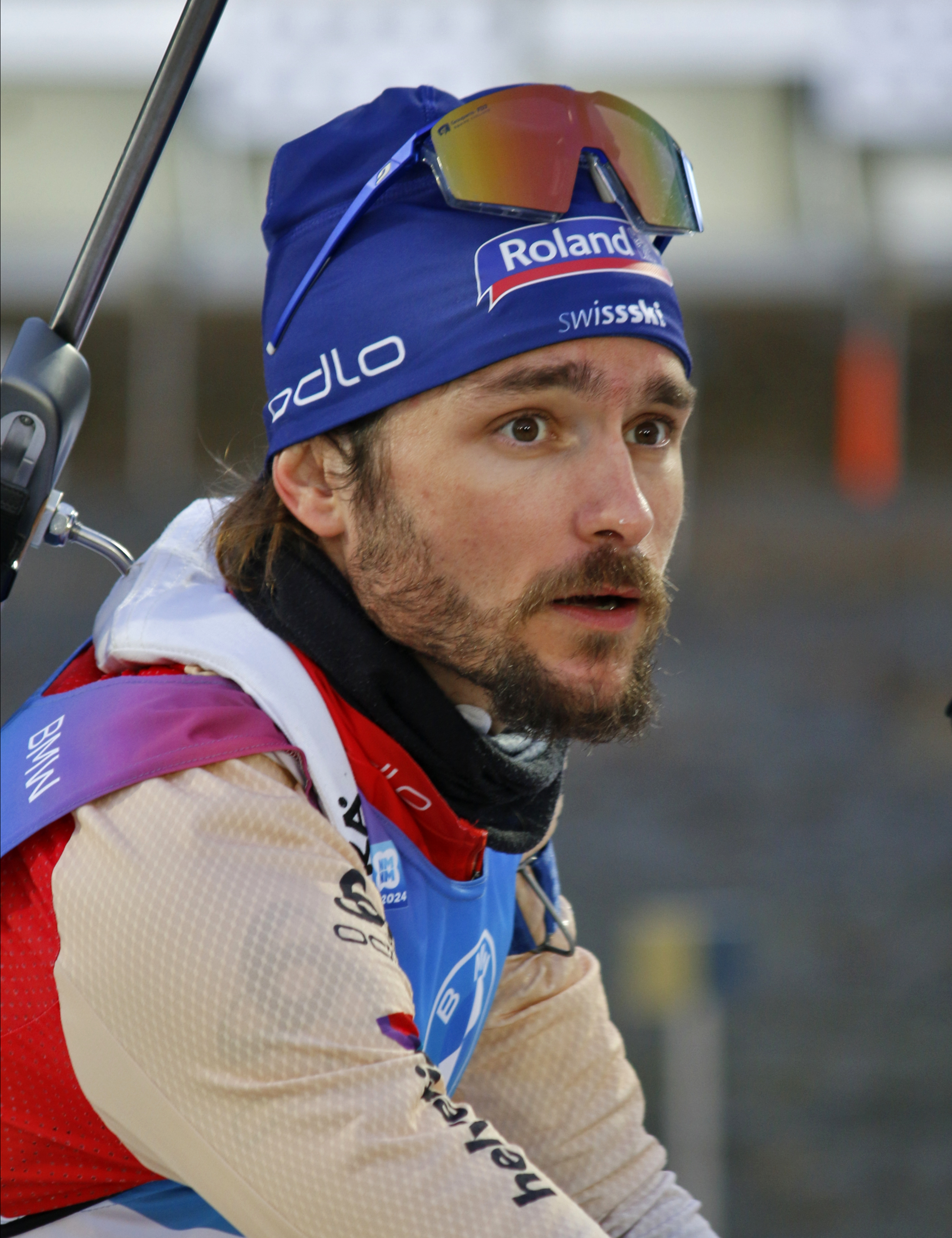
- Finello in 2024

Personal information
- Nationality: Switzerland
- Born: 13 May 1992 (age 33) Martigny, Switzerland

Sport
- Sport: Biathlon

Jeremy Finello (born 13 May 1992) is a Swiss biathlete. He competed in the 2018 Winter Olympics.

== Biathlon results ==
All results are sourced from the International Biathlon Union.

=== Olympic Games ===
0 medals

Event	Individual	Sprint	Pursuit	Mass start	Relay	Mixed relay
(South Korea) 2018 Pyeongchang	47th	63rd	—	—	15th	—
(Italy) 2026 Milano Cortina	63rd	76th	—	—	8th	—

=== World Championships ===
0 medals

Event	Individual	Sprint	Pursuit	Mass start	Relay	Mixed relay	Single Mixed relay
(Austria) 2017 Hochfilzen	63rd	81st	—	—	16th	—	—
(Sweden) 2019 Östersund	24th	32nd	31st	23rd	11th	11th	—
(Italy) 2020 Rasen-Antholz	—	—	—	—	15th	—	—
(Slovenia) 2021 Pokljuka	17th	72nd	—	—	11th	10th	—
(Germany) 2023 Oberhof	45th	52nd	28th	—	6th	—	—
(Czech Republic) 2024 Nové Město na Moravě	80th	46th	DNF	—	14th	—	—

*During Olympic seasons competitions are only held for those events not included in the Olympic program.
**The single mixed relay was added as an event in 2019.
