= Lars Helge Birkeland =

Norwegian biathlete (born 1988)

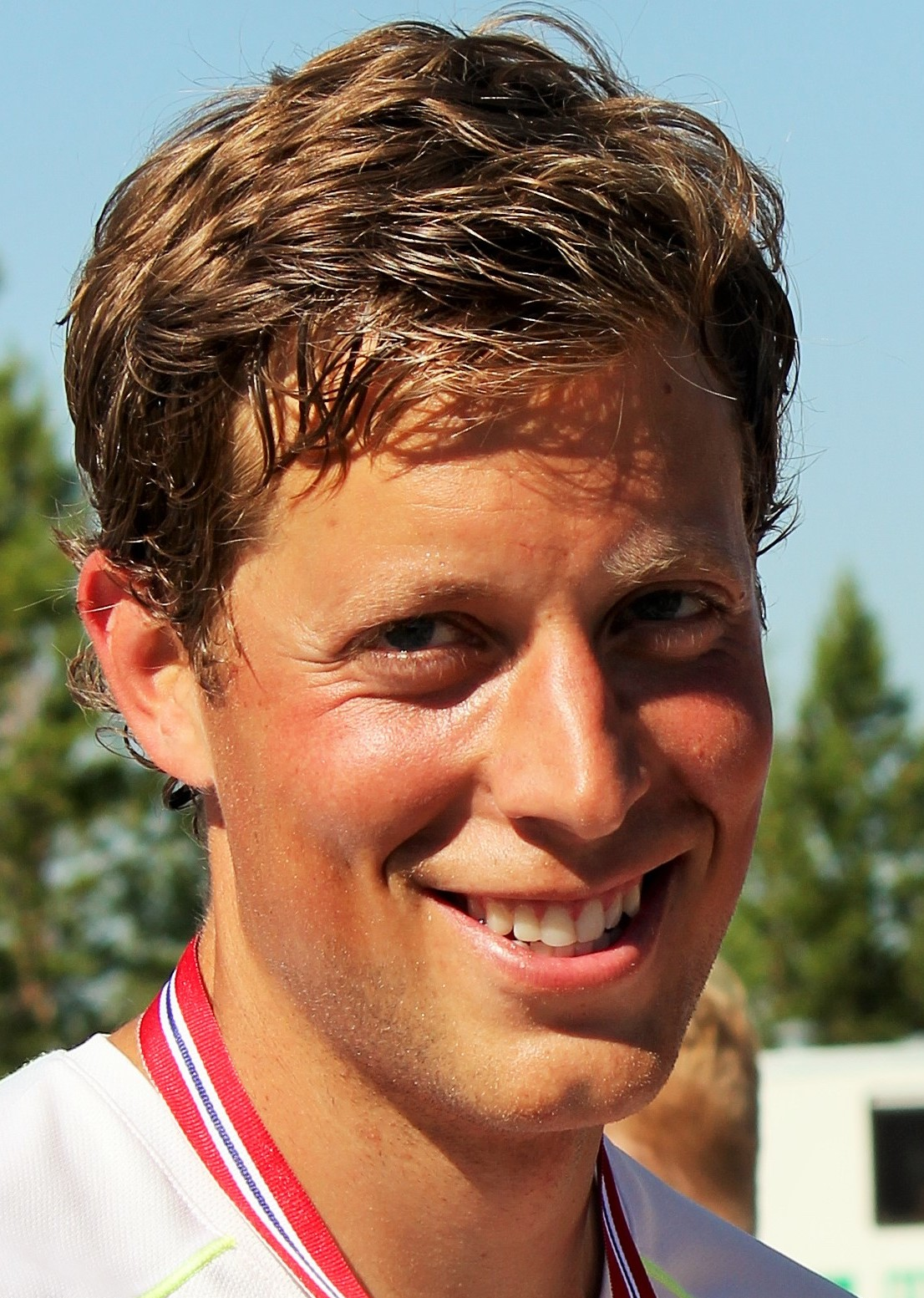
- Lars Helge Birkeland during the Norwegian Rolling-Ski Biathlon Championship in August 2015

Personal information
- Born: 11 February 1988 (age 38) Tønsberg, Norway
- Height: 1.90 m (6 ft 3 in)

Sport

Professional information
- Sport: Biathlon
- Club: Birkenes IL
- World Cup debut: 2011

Olympic Games
- Teams: 1 – (2018)
- Medals: 1 (0 gold)

World Championships
- Teams: 4 (2012, 2013, 2017), 2019)
- Medals: 1 (1 gold)

World Cup
- Seasons: 6 (2011/12–)
- All races: 74
- Individual victories: 0
- All victories: 2
- Individual podiums: 0
- All podiums: 7
Medal record
Olympic Games
Silver medal – second place	2018 Pyeongchang	4 × 7.5 km relay
World Championships
Gold medal – first place	2019 Östersund	4 x 7.5 km relay
European Championships
Gold medal – first place	2014 Nové Město	10 km sprint
Silver medal – second place	2014 Nové Město	12.5 km pursuit
Silver medal – second place	2014 Nové Město	4x7.5 km relay
Silver medal – second place	2015 Otepää	10 km sprint
Silver medal – second place	2015 Otepää	4x7.5 km relay

Lars Helge Birkeland (born 11 February 1988) is a retired Norwegian biathlete.

== Biathlon results ==
All results are sourced from the International Biathlon Union.

=== Olympic Games ===
1 medal (1 silver)

Event	Individual	Sprint	Pursuit	Mass start	Relay	Mixed relay
(South Korea) 2018 Pyeongchang	60th	—	—	—	Silver	—

*The mixed relay was added as an event in 2014.

=== World Championships ===
1 medal (1 gold)

Event	Individual	Sprint	Pursuit	Mass start	Relay	Mixed relay
(Germany) 2012 Ruhpolding	39th	—	—	—	—	—
(Czech Republic) 2013 Nové Město	44th	—	—	—	—	—
(Austria) 2017 Hochfilzen	9th	—	—	—	—	—
(Sweden) 2019 Östersund	18th	—	—	—	Gold	—

*During Olympic seasons competitions are only held for those events not included in the Olympic program.
**The mixed relay was added as an event in 2005.
