= 2018–19 Biathlon World Cup – Overall Women =

In the women's 2018–19 Biathlon World Cup total score, for each participating athlete the points earned in all Individual, Sprint, Pursuit and Mass start competitions held during the season are added up with the two lowest scores subtracted at the end of the season to give that athlete's final score. This includes the results from the Biathlon World Championships 2019 (held between the World Cup stages in Salt Lake City and Oslo).

== 2017–18 Top 3 standings ==
Medal	Athlete	Points
Gold:	(Finland) Kaisa Mäkäräinen	822
Silver:	(Slovakia) Anastasiya Kuzmina	819
Bronze:	(Belarus) Darya Domracheva	804

== Events summary ==
Event	Winner	Second	Third
Pokljuka 15 km Individual details	Yuliia Dzhima; Ukraine	Monika Hojnisz; Poland	Markéta Davidová; Czech Republic
Pokljuka 7.5 km Sprint details	Kaisa Mäkäräinen; Finland	Dorothea Wierer; Italy	Justine Braisaz; France
Pokljuka 10 km Pursuit details	Kaisa Mäkäräinen; Finland	Dorothea Wierer; Italy	Paulina Fialková; Slovakia
Hochfilzen 7.5 km Sprint details	Dorothea Wierer; Italy	Kaisa Mäkäräinen; Finland	Ekaterina Yurlova-Percht; Russia
Hochfilzen 10 km Pursuit details	Kaisa Mäkäräinen; Finland	Paulina Fialková; Slovakia	Dorothea Wierer; Italy
Nové Mesto 7.5 km Sprint details	Marte Olsbu Røiseland; Norway	Laura Dahlmeier; Germany	Paulina Fialková; Slovakia
Nové Mesto 10 km Pursuit details	Marte Olsbu Røiseland; Norway	Dorothea Wierer; Italy	Hanna Öberg; Sweden
Nové Mesto 12.5 km Mass start details	Anastasiya Kuzmina; Slovakia	Paulina Fialková; Slovakia	Anaïs Chevalier; France
Oberhof 7.5 km Sprint details	Lisa Vittozzi; Italy	Anaïs Chevalier; France	Hanna Öberg; Sweden
Oberhof 10 km Pursuit details	Lisa Vittozzi; Italy	Anastasiya Kuzmina; Slovakia	Anaïs Chevalier; France
Ruhpolding 7.5 km Sprint details	Anastasiya Kuzmina; Slovakia	Lisa Vittozzi; Italy	Hanna Öberg; Sweden
Ruhpolding 12.5 km Mass start details	Franziska Preuß; Germany	Ingrid Landmark Tandrevold; Norway	Paulina Fialková; Slovakia
Antholz-Anterselva 7.5 km Sprint details	Markéta Davidová; Czech Republic	Kaisa Mäkäräinen; Finland	Marte Olsbu Røiseland; Norway
Antholz-Anterselva 10 km Pursuit details	Dorothea Wierer; Italy	Laura Dahlmeier; Germany	Lisa Vittozzi; Italy
Antholz-Anterselva 12.5 km Mass start details	Laura Dahlmeier; Germany	Markéta Davidová; Czech Republic	Vanessa Hinz; Germany
Canmore 12.5 km Short Individual details	Tiril Eckhoff; Norway	Markéta Davidová; Czech Republic	Lisa Vittozzi; Italy
Canmore 7.5 km Sprint details	cancelled due to cold weather		
Salt Lake City 7.5 km Sprint details	Marte Olsbu Røiseland; Norway	Kaisa Mäkäräinen; Finland	Franziska Hildebrand; Germany
Salt Lake City 10 km Pursuit details	Denise Herrmann; Germany	Franziska Hildebrand; Germany	Kaisa Mäkäräinen; Finland
World Championships 7.5 km Sprint details	Anastasiya Kuzmina; Slovakia	Ingrid Landmark Tandrevold; Norway	Laura Dahlmeier; Germany
World Championships 10 km Pursuit details	Denise Herrmann; Germany	Tiril Eckhoff; Norway	Laura Dahlmeier; Germany
World Championships 15 km Individual details	Hanna Öberg; Sweden	Lisa Vittozzi; Italy	Justine Braisaz; France
World Championships 12.5 km Mass Start details	Dorothea Wierer; Italy	Ekaterina Yurlova-Percht; Russia	Denise Herrmann; Germany
Oslo Holmenkollen 7.5 km Sprint details	Anastasiya Kuzmina; Slovakia	Franziska Preuß; Germany	Paulina Fialková; Slovakia
Oslo Holmenkollen 10 km Pursuit details	Anastasiya Kuzmina; Slovakia	Denise Herrmann; Germany	Hanna Öberg; Sweden
Oslo Holmenkollen 12.5 km Mass start details	Hanna Öberg; Sweden	Tiril Eckhoff; Norway	Clare Egan; United States

== Standings ==
Point system
Place	IN	SP	PU	MS
1	60			
2	54			
3	48			
4	43			
5	40			
6	38			
7	36			
8	34			
9	32			
10	31			
11	30			
12	29			
13	28			
14	27			
15	26			
16	25			
17	24			
18	23			
19	22			
20	21			
21	20			
22	19			18
23	18			16
24	17			14
25	16			12
26	15			10
27	14			8
28	13			6
29	12			4
30	11			2
31	10			—
32	9			—
33	8			—
34	7			—
35	6			—
36	5			—
37	4			—
38	3			—
39	2			—
40	1			—

In each event places 1 to 40 (1 to 30 in a Mass start) are awarded points, a victory being worth 60 points. The full point system is shown in the table on the right. In a Mass start event only 30 athletes are allowed to participate and the points awarded for ranks 22 to 30 differ from the system used in other events. Equal placings (ties) give an equal number of points. An athlete's total World Cup Score is the sum of all World Cup points earned in the season, minus the points from 2 events in which the athlete got their worst scores. Ties in this score are broken by comparing the tied athletes' number of victories. If this number is the same for the athletes in question, the number of second places is compared, and so on. If a tie cannot be broken by this procedure, it remains a tie.

#	Name	POK IN	POK SP	POK PU	HOC SP	HOC PU	NOV SP	NOV PU	NOV MS	OBE SP	OBE PU	RUH SP	RUH MS	ANT SP	ANT PU	ANT MS	CAN SI	CAN SP	SLC SP	SLC PU	ÖST SP	ÖST PU	ÖST IN	ÖST MS	OSL SP	OSL PU	OSL MS	Total
1.	Dorothea Wierer (ITA)	36	54	54	60	48	32	54	43	~~17~~	40	38	22	34	60	40	~~19~~	—	34	21	31	21	34	60	30	29	29	904
2	Lisa Vittozzi (ITA)	38	40	43	43	38	23	43	8	60	60	54	30	40	48	30	48	—	29	38	20	31	54	34	0	—	30	882
3	Anastasiya Kuzmina (SVK)	16	23	~~5~~	31	40	30	32	60	36	54	60	27	31	40	21	34	—	40	40	60	38	0	6	60	60	31	870
4	Marte Olsbu Røiseland (NOR)	20	18	40	0	~~11~~	60	60	28	43	29	43	34	48	43	31	29	—	60	43	16	43	18	36	38	43	32	855
5	Hanna Öberg (SWE)	34	DNS	—	6	26	38	48	31	48	34	48	43	7	17	43	—	—	—	—	43	40	60	43	24	48	60	741
6	Paulína Fialková (SVK)	43	38	48	36	54	48	24	54	20	9	27	48	11	13	25	28	—	—	—	0	DNS	40	29	48	6	38	687
7	Kaisa Mäkäräinen (FIN)	11	60	60	54	60	0	5	18	0	19	20	8	54	36	38	0	—	54	48	29	24	0	16	9	34	16	673
8	Denise Herrmann (GER)	12	0	—	0	15	0	15	—	5	32	24	29	27	18	28	27	—	36	60	38	60	—	48	40	54	43	611
9	Franziska Preuß (GER)	31	32	32	13	18	25	30	36	0	38	31	60	—	—	—	23	—	0	13	25	14	3	22	54	36	34	570
10	Monika Hojnisz (POL)	54	30	20	40	43	1	25	29	21	11	30	10	38	DNS	27	10	—	43	36	7	DNS	2	28	28	24	10	567
11	Ingrid Landmark Tandrevold (NOR)	13	14	11	21	24	7	~~4~~	38	27	26	15	54	17	24	10	40	—	6	22	54	34	23	30	25	~~4~~	22	557
12	Laura Dahlmeier (GER)	—	—	—	—	—	54	40	—	—	—	32	2	43	54	60	32	—	—	—	48	48	43	38	14	21	25	554
13	Tiril Eckhoff (NOR)	—	—	—	25	25	18	23	—	8	7	8	—	26	29	29	60	—	0	0	32	54	4	40	36	38	54	516
14	Ekaterina Yurlova-Percht (RUS)	0	0	24	48	21	10	16	32	13	27	17	24	25	5	22	—	—	—	—	34	22	24	54	27	26	23	494
15	Iryna Kryuko (BLR)	27	24	36	38	29	21	18	26	40	31	5	38	24	34	36	—	—	—	—	15	8	0	14	0	—	28	492
16	Franziska Hildebrand (GER)	19	3	18	28	32	20	0	25	~~1~~	17	23	16	14	23	8	43	—	48	54	1	19	10	20	16	22	12	491
17	Lisa Theresa Hauser (AUT)	32	0	21	19	22	11	12	2	30	16	19	28	32	38	16	26	—	14	28	0	—	36	—	15	30	40	487
18	Clare Egan (USA)	0	26	38	0	—	15	21	27	28	8	6	14	19	30	26	0	—	20	14	30	29	0	10	29	32	48	470
19	Mona Brorsson (SWE)	0	22	25	29	19	5	29	40	4	0	28	31	20	16	32	—	—	—	—	40	36	38	27	0	—	20	461
20	Anaïs Chevalier (FRA)	24	0	16	34	28	43	34	48	54	48	36	4	22	DNF	—	17	—	8	5	9	DNS	0	—	—	—	—	430
21	Markéta Davidová (CZE)	48	9	0	0	—	0	—	—	22	0	0	—	60	27	54	54	—	9	29	36	28	0	25	0	0	27	428
22	Anaïs Bescond (FRA)	0	11	8	10	12	17	28	20	34	43	40	32	28	22	24	36	—	1	17	—	—	—	—	0	16	24	423
23	Julia Simon (FRA)	8	43	27	18	31	13	8	24	10	DNS	26	25	30	31	DNF	22	—	28	18	0	—	17	—	0	—	36	415
24	Celia Aymonier (FRA)	0	1	0	24	17	8	14	—	32	25	13	—	0	11	—	16	—	30	31	18	23	21	21	43	31	18	397
25	Lena Häcki (SUI)	0	8	28	8	16	40	31	12	3	24	0	40	21	32	12	11	—	13	12	0	27	30	2	0	—	8	378
26	Justine Braisaz (FRA)	0	48	29	0	0	0	20	34	0	0	36	20	10	DNS	20	13	—	24	24	0	DNS	48	26	0	—	DNF	352
27	Vanessa Hinz (GER)	9	17	12	30	20	19	38	30	—	—	3	26	3	15	48	38	—	7	4	0	—	22	—	0	—	—	341
28	Linn Persson (SWE)	22	0	0	11	30	4	26	—	0	—	25	36	13	DNS	—	—	—	—	—	0	20	26	32	34	40	21	340
29	Irina Starykh (RUS)	29	29	34	32	34	31	2	6	12	0	—	23	29	28	18	—	—	—	—	0	0	—	—	—	—	—	307
30	Veronika Vítková (CZE)	3	0	1	16	27	22	DNF	—	0	—	0	—	0	0	—	0	—	22	32	3	25	28	24	18	28	4	253
#	Name	POK IN	POK SP	POK PU	HOC SP	HOC PU	NOV SP	NOV PU	NOV MS	OBE SP	OBE PU	RUH SP	RUH MS	ANT SP	ANT PU	ANT MS	CAN SI	CAN SP	SLC SP	SLC PU	ÖST SP	ÖST PU	ÖST IN	ÖST MS	OSL SP	OSL PU	OSL MS	Total
31	Svetlana Mironova (RUS)	—	—	—	—	—	—	—	—	24	0	29	21	36	0	23	—	—	—	—	10	16	8	—	26	25	26	244
32	Karolin Horchler (GER)	4	4	13	27	5	14	0	—	7	30	22	18	5	20	34	0	—	0	0	—	—	—	—	21	15	—	239
33	Evgeniya Pavlova (RUS)	10	34	31	9	23	DNS	—	—	19	28	0	6	—	—	—	—	—	—	—	17	32	—	23	DNS	—	—	232
34	Susan Dunklee (USA)	30	0	2	7	13	2	0	—	31	36	21	12	0	—	—	—	—	0	15	0	17	11	—	11	23	—	231
35	Anastasiya Merkushyna (UKR)	25	0	4	0	—	27	19	16	6	22	0	—	6	6	—	—	—	—	—	13	26	31	12	0	0	—	213
36	Elisa Gasparin (SUI)	0	27	23	17	3	0	0	—	0	—	0	—	0	—	—	30	—	25	20	22	12	20	4	4	0	—	207
37	Yuliia Dzhima (UKR)	60	21	17	—	—	0	0	21	0	—	0	—	—	—	—	0	—	31	8	0	DNS	29	—	—	—	—	187
38	Margarita Vasileva (RUS)	0	28	26	0	—	0	—	—	0	23	0	—	0	—	—	25	—	27	26	—	—	—	—	—	—	—	155
39	Eva Puskarčíková (CZE)	15	19	6	12	DNS	0	0	—	29	20	0	—	0	0	—	0	—	18	19	0	0	0	—	0	14	—	152
40	Anna Frolina (KOR)	0	25	22	27	0	0	—	—	23	5	17	—	9	21	—	0	—	—	—	0	—	0	—	0	—	—	149
41	Fuyuko Tachizaki (JPN)	1	0	0	5	9	0	1	—	0	0	2	—	16	25	14	21	—	19	10	2	15	7	—	0	2	—	149
42	Federica Sanfilippo (ITA)	0	5	19	22	36	9	11	10	26	1	0	—	0	0	—	0	—	0	—	7	2	—	—	0	—	—	148
43	Elisabeth Högberg (SWE)	—	—	—	—	—	—	—	—	0	18	—	—	—	—	—	0	—	32	25	—	—	—	—	31	27	14	147
44	Olena Pidhrushna (UKR)	26	36	14	14	DNF	28	DNF	23	—	—	0	—	DNF	—	—	5	—	—	—	—	—	—	—	—	—	—	146
45	Nicole Gontier (ITA)	0	6	15	0	—	0	—	—	25	21	0	—	23	26	4	0	—	2	23	0	0	0	—	0	—	—	145
46	Vita Semerenko (UKR)	0	—	—	0	DNS	36	10	4	38	15	12	—	0	—	—	—	—	—	—	0	—	—	—	13	11	—	139
47	Baiba Bendika (LAT)	40	13	0	0	0	16	0	—	0	0	1	—	0	—	—	2	—	0	—	24	18	0	8	7	0	—	129
48	Valj Semerenko (UKR)	—	16	DNF	0	DNS	26	36	14	0	—	0	—	0	DNS	—	—	—	—	—	12	3	5	—	0	5	—	117
49	Joanne Reid (USA)	—	0	0	0	10	0	0	—	—	—	4	—	12	12	—	0	—	0	1	26	9	9	31	0	0	—	114
50	Tuuli Tomingas (EST)	0	0	—	0	—	—	—	—	0	0	10	—	2	0	—	3	—	27	27	0	13	16	—	12	0	—	110
51	Synnøve Solemdal (NOR)	2	0	—	—	—	0	17	—	—	—	0	—	0	—	—	9	—	16	11	0	—	12	—	20	19	—	106
52	Rosanna Crawford (CAN)	0	0	—	0	0	0	0	—	0	0	14	—	18	7	6	12	—	17	7	23	LAP	0	—	—	—	—	104
53	Emma Lunder (CAN)	—	—	—	—	—	24	6	—	0	2	0	—	0	—	—	0	—	0	0	0	LAP	15	—	32	17	6	102
54	Dzinara Alimbekava (BLR)	0	0	—	1	4	0	—	—	16	14	0	—	0	—	—	—	—	—	—	28	6	0	—	22	8	—	99
55	Kinga Zbylut (POL)	0	0	0	0	—	34	22	22	0	6	11	—	0	—	—	DNS	—	0	DNS	0	—	0	—	0	—	—	95
56	Julia Schwaiger (AUT)	17	12	0	0	7	6	13	—	0	—	0	—	0	9	—	31	—	DNF	—	0	0	0	—	0	0	—	95
57	Uliana Kaisheva (RUS)	7	0	—	0	—	—	—	—	—	—	—	—	—	—	—	24	—	21	30	—	—	0	—	0	0	—	82
58	Valeriia Vasnetcova (RUS)	28	20	10	23	0	0	—	—	0	0	—	—	—	—	—	0	—	0	DNS	—	—	—	—	—	—	—	81
59	Emma Nilsson (SWE)	23	15	3	0	6	0	0	—	—	—	0	—	0	LAP	—	—	—	—	—	—	—	19	—	3	10	—	79
60	Johanna Talihärm (EST)	—	—	—	—	—	0	—	—	15	10	0	—	0	—	—	0	—	12	0	21	7	13	—	0	0	—	78
#	Name	POK IN	POK SP	POK PU	HOC SP	HOC PU	NOV SP	NOV PU	NOV MS	OBE SP	OBE PU	RUH SP	RUH MS	ANT SP	ANT PU	ANT MS	CAN SI	CAN SP	SLC SP	SLC PU	ÖST SP	ÖST PU	ÖST IN	ÖST MS	OSL SP	OSL PU	OSL MS	Total
61	Kamila Zuk (POL)	0	0	—	0	0	0	—	—	0	0	0	—	0	DNS	—	0	—	38	34	0	5	0	—	0	—	—	77
62	Larisa Kuklina (RUS)	—	—	—	—	—	—	—	—	—	—	0	—	0	14	—	DNS	—	DNS	—	—	—	25	—	19	12	—	70
63	Anna Weidel (GER)	0	31	30	0	8	—	—	—	0	—	—	—	—	—	—	—	—	—	—	—	—	—	—	—	—	—	69
64	Sari Maeda (JPN)	0	0	—	15	2	0	—	—	0	—	0	—	0	—	—	0	—	10	0	27	11	0	—	0	—	—	65
65	Elena Kruchinkina (BLR)	—	—	—	—	—	—	—	—	—	—	18	—	4	1	—	—	—	—	—	5	0	0	—	23	13	—	64
66	Selina Gasparin (SUI)	—	—	—	—	—	—	—	—	—	—	—	—	—	—	—	—	—	—	—	11	0	32	18	2	0	—	63
67	Caroline Colombo (FRA)	—	—	—	—	—	—	—	—	0	—	0	—	0	19	—	6	—	11	9	—	—	—	—	10	3	—	58
68	Anna Magnusson (SWE)	0	0	—	0	—	0	27	—	—	—	0	—	0	—	—	—	—	—	—	0	30	0	—	0	—	—	57
69	Ivona Fialková (SVK)	14	0	—	0	0	0	0	—	18	0	0	—	0	8	—	—	—	—	—	8	4	0	—	0	—	—	52
70	Yuliya Zhuravok (UKR)	21	0	—	—	—	—	—	—	0	—	—	—	0	—	—	0	—	—	—	—	—	27	—	—	—	—	48
71	Katharina Innerhofer (AUT)	0	2	7	3	1	0	—	—	0	—	0	—	0	DNS	—	—	—	—	—	0	1	—	—	8	20	—	42
72	Irina Kruchinkina (BLR)	0	0	LAP	0	—	0	0	—	11	12	0	—	0	—	—	—	—	—	—	19	0	0	—	0	—	—	42
73	Alexia Runggaldier (ITA)	6	0	0	0	14	0	—	—	0	—	0	—	—	—	—	0	—	5	16	—	—	0	—	—	—	—	41
74	Sarah Beaudry (CAN)	—	—	—	—	—	29	3	—	0	—	0	—	1	0	—	7	—	0	0	0	0	0	—	0	—	—	40
75	Thekla Brun-Lie (NOR)	0	0	—	DNS	—	—	—	—	0	0	—	—	—	—	—	4	—	15	3	—	—	—	—	0	18	—	40
76	Regina Oja (EST)	0	0	0	0	—	0	0	—	—	—	0	—	0	3	—	18	—	4	6	—	—	0	—	7	0	—	38
77	Iana Bondar (UKR)	—	—	—	—	—	—	—	—	—	—	—	—	—	—	—	14	—	23	0	—	—	—	—	0	LAP	—	37
78	Zhang Yan (CHN)	0	0	DNS	0	0	0	0	—	9	0	0	—	0	DNS	—	0	—	—	—	4	10	14	—	—	—	—	37
79	Emilie Ågheim Kalkenberg (NOR)	0	0	0	4	DNS	0	9	—	0	—	0	—	—	—	—	20	—	0	—	—	—	—	—	0	—	—	33
80	Megan Bankes (CAN)	0	0	—	0	—	—	—	—	0	—	0	—	15	2	—	15	—	0	—	0	LAP	0	—	0	0	—	32
81	Lucie Charvátová (CZE)	0	0	—	0	—	12	7	—	0	—	0	—	0	4	—	8	—	—	—	—	—	—	—	0	—	—	31
82	Nadine Horchler (GER)	18	0	9	—	—	—	—	—	0	0	—	—	—	—	—	—	—	—	—	—	—	—	—	0	0	—	27
83	Tang Jialin (CHN)	0	0	0	0	—	0	0	—	14	4	0	—	8	LAP	—	0	—	—	—	0	0	1	—	—	—	—	27
84	Viktoria Slivko (RUS)	—	—	—	—	—	—	—	—	—	—	—	—	—	—	—	—	—	—	—	—	—	—	—	17	7	—	24
85	Aita Gasparin (SUI)	0	0	—	20	0	0	—	—	0	—	0	—	0	—	—	0	—	0	0	0	—	—	—	—	—	—	20
86	Natalija Kočergina (LTU)	0	0	—	0	—	0	—	—	0	—	0	—	0	DNS	—	0	—	0	—	14	0	0	—	0	—	—	14
87	Karoline Offigstad Knotten (NOR)	—	0	—	—	—	—	—	—	0	13	0	—	—	—	—	—	—	—	—	—	—	—	—	0	—	—	13
88	Anastasiia Morozova (RUS)	—	—	—	—	—	3	0	—	—	—	9	—	DNS	—	—	—	—	—	—	—	—	—	—	0	LAP	—	12
89	Yelizaveta Belchenko (KAZ)	0	0	0	0	0	0	—	—	0	—	0	—	0	10	—	0	—	0	—	DNS	—	0	—	0	—	—	10
90	Jessica Jislová (CZE)	0	10	0	DNS	—	—	—	—	—	—	0	—	0	—	—	—	—	—	—	—	—	0	—	0	—	—	10
#	Name	POK IN	POK SP	POK PU	HOC SP	HOC PU	NOV SP	NOV PU	NOV MS	OBE SP	OBE PU	RUH SP	RUH MS	ANT SP	ANT PU	ANT MS	CAN SI	CAN SP	SLC SP	SLC PU	ÖST SP	ÖST PU	ÖST IN	ÖST MS	OSL SP	OSL PU	OSL MS	Total
91	Hanna Sola (BLR)	0	0	—	0	—	0	—	—	0	3	7	—	0	—	—	0	—	0	DNS	—	—	—	—	0	—	—	10
92	Janina Hettich (GER)	—	—	—	—	—	—	—	—	—	—	—	—	—	—	—	—	—	—	—	—	—	—	—	0	9	—	9
93	Christina Rieder (AUT)	—	—	—	—	—	—	—	—	0	0	0	—	0	0	—	0	—	0	2	—	—	6	—	0	0	—	8
94	Emilia Yordanova (BUL)	0	7	0	0	—	0	—	—	0	—	0	—	0	—	—	0	—	0	—	0	—	0	—	0	—	—	7
95	Venla Lehtonen (FIN)	5	0	—	0	—	0	—	—	0	—	0	—	—	—	—	—	—	—	—	0	0	0	—	0	—	—	5
96	Desislava Stoyanova (BUL)	0	0	0	0	DNS	0	—	—	0	—	0	—	0	DNS	—	0	—	0	DNS	0	—	0	—	5	DNS	—	5
97	Darya Yurkevich (BLR)	0	0	—	0	—	—	—	—	0	—	—	—	—	—	—	0	—	4	0	—	—	—	—	—	—	—	4
98	Urska Poje (SLO)	0	0	—	3	0	0	—	—	0	—	0	—	—	—	—	0	—	0	—	—	—	0	—	0	0	—	3
99	Susanna Meinen (SUI)	—	0	—	0	0	0	—	—	2	0	0	—	0	—	—	0	—	0	0	—	—	—	—	—	—	—	2
100	Leisan Biktasheva (RUS)	—	—	—	—	—	—	—	—	—	—	—	—	—	—	—	1	—	0	0	—	—	—	—	—	—	—	1
101	Chloé Chevalier (FRA)	—	—	—	—	—	—	—	—	—	—	—	—	—	—	—	—	—	—	—	—	—	—	—	1	0	—	1
102	Ingela Andersson (SWE)	—	—	—	—	—	—	—	—	0	—	—	—	—	—	—	0	—	0	—	—	—	—	—	0	1	—	1
