= 2018–19 Biathlon World Cup – Pursuit Women =

The 2018–19 Biathlon World Cup – Pursuit Women started on Sunday 9 December 2018 in Pokljuka and finished on Saturday 23 March 2019 in Holmenkollen. It was won by Dorothea Wierer of Italy, with the defending titlist, Anastasiya Kuzmina of Slovakia, finishing third.

== Competition format ==
The 10 kilometres (6.2 mi) pursuit race is skied over five laps. The biathlete shoots four times at any shooting lane, in the order of prone, prone, standing, standing, totalling 20 targets. For each missed target a biathlete has to run a 150 metres (490 ft) penalty loop. Competitors' starts are staggered, according to the result of the previous sprint race.

== 2017–18 Top 3 standings ==
Medal	Athlete	Points
Gold:	(Slovakia) Anastasiya Kuzmina	301
Silver:	(Finland) Kaisa Mäkäräinen	280
Bronze:	(Germany) Laura Dahlmeier	271

== Medal winners ==
Event	Gold	Time	Silver	Time	Bronze	Time
Pokljuka details	Kaisa Mäkäräinen; Finland	29:16.9 (0+0+0+0)	Dorothea Wierer; Italy	29:58.2 (0+0+0+0)	Paulína Fialková; Slovakia	30:16.1 (0+0+0+0)
Hochfilzen details	Kaisa Mäkäräinen; Finland	30:53.1 (1+0+1+1)	Paulína Fialková; Slovakia	30:54.6 (0+0+1+1)	Dorothea Wierer; Italy	30:55.9 (2+0+1+1)
Nové Město details	Marte Olsbu Røiseland; Norway	29:53.5 (0+0+1+1)	Dorothea Wierer; Italy	29:53.7 (0+0+0+1)	Hanna Öberg; Sweden	29:58.2 (0+0+0+1)
Oberhof details	Lisa Vittozzi; Italy	32:32.9 (0+1+1+0)	Anastasiya Kuzmina; Slovakia	32:47.4 (2+1+1+0)	Anaïs Chevalier; France	33:00.8 (2+1+2+0)
Antholz-Anterselva details	Dorothea Wierer; Italy	29:20.1 (1+0+0+1)	Laura Dahlmeier; Germany	29:26.1 (0+0+1+0)	Lisa Vittozzi; Italy	29:36.3 (1+0+0+1)
Salt Lake City details	Denise Herrmann; Germany	28:03.4 (0+0+1+1)	Franziska Hildebrand; Germany	28:07.6 (0+0+0+1)	Kaisa Mäkäräinen; Finland	28:19.9 (2+0+1+0)
World Championships details	Denise Herrmann; Germany	31:45.9 (0+0+2+0)	Tiril Eckhoff; Norway	32:17.3 (0+0+2+0)	Laura Dahlmeier; Germany	32:17.5 (0+0+1+0)
Oslo Holmenkollen details	Anastasiya Kuzmina; Slovakia	28:25.9 (0+0+0+0)	Denise Herrmann; Germany	30:08.7 (1+0+0+1)	Hanna Öberg; Sweden	30:27.0 (0+0+0+1)

== Standings ==
#	Name	POK	HOC	NOV	OBE	ANT	SLC	ÖST	OSL	Total
1	Dorothea Wierer (ITA)	54	48	54	40	60	22	21	29	328
2	Marte Olsbu Røiseland (NOR)	40	11	60	29	43	43	43	43	312
3	Anastasiya Kuzmina (SVK)	5	40	32	54	40	40	38	60	309
4	Lisa Vittozzi (ITA)	43	38	43	60	48	38	31	—	301
5	Kaisa Mäkäräinen (FIN)	60	60	5	19	36	48	24	34	286
6	Denise Herrmann (GER)	—	15	15	32	18	60	60	54	254
7	Hanna Öberg (SWE)	—	26	48	34	17	—	40	48	213
8	Franziska Hildebrand (GER)	18	32	0	17	23	54	19	22	185
9	Franziska Preuß (GER)	32	18	30	38	—	14	14	36	182
10	Tiril Eckhoff (NOR)	—	25	23	7	29	0	54	38	176
11	Clare Egan (USA)	38	—	21	8	30	15	29	32	173
12	Lena Häcki (SUI)	28	16	31	24	32	13	27	—	171
13	Lisa Theresa Hauser (AUT)	21	22	12	16	38	28	—	30	167
14	Laura Dahlmeier (GER)	—	—	40	—	54	—	48	21	163
15	Monika Hojnisz (POL)	20	43	25	11	DNS	36	DNS	24	159
16	Iryna Kryuko (BLR)	36	29	18	31	34	—	8	—	156
17	Paulína Fialková (SVK)	48	54	24	9	13	—	DNS	6	154
18	Celia Aymonier (FRA)	0	17	14	25	11	31	23	31	152
19	Ingrid Landmark Tandrevold (NOR)	11	24	4	26	24	23	34	4	150
20	Anaïs Bescond (FRA)	8	12	28	43	22	18	—	16	147
21	Ekaterina Yurlova-Percht (RUS)	24	21	16	27	5	—	22	26	141
22	Anaïs Chevalier (FRA)	16	28	34	48	DNF	6	DNS	—	132
23	Mona Brorsson (SWE)	25	19	29	0	16	—	36	—	125
24	Linn Persson (SWE)	0	30	26	—	DNS	—	20	40	116
25	Julia Simon (FRA)	27	31	8	DNS	31	19	—	—	116
26	Evgeniya Pavlova (RUS)	31	23	—	28	—	—	32	—	114
27	Veronika Vítková (CZE)	1	27	DNF	—	0	32	25	28	113
28	Susan Dunklee (USA)	2	13	0	36	—	16	17	23	107
29	Irina Starykh (RUS)	34	34	2	0	28	—	0	—	98
30	Vanessa Hinz (GER)	12	20	38	—	15	5	—	—	90
#	Name	POK	HOC	NOV	OBE	ANT	SLC	ÖST	OSL	Total
31	Nicole Gontier (ITA)	15	—	—	21	26	24	0	—	86
32	Karolin Horchler (GER)	13	5	0	30	20	1	—	15	84
33	Markéta Davidová (CZE)	0	—	—	0	27	29	28	0	84
34	Anastasiya Merkushyna (UKR)	4	—	19	22	6	—	26	0	77
35	Justine Braisaz (FRA)	29	0	20	0	DNS	25	DNS	—	74
36	Elisabeth Högberg (SWE)	—	—	—	18	—	26	—	27	71
37	Federica Sanfilippo (ITA)	19	36	11	1	0	—	2	—	69
38	Fuyuko Tachizaki (JPN)	0	9	1	0	25	11	15	2	63
39	Eva Puskarčíková (CZE)	6	DNS	0	20	0	20	0	14	60
40	Elisa Gasparin (SUI)	23	3	0	—	—	21	12	0	59
41	Anna Magnusson (SWE)	—	—	27	—	—	—	30	—	57
42	Margarita Vasileva (RUS)	26	—	—	23	—	DSQ	—	—	49
43	Anna Frolina (KOR)	22	0	—	5	21	—	—	—	48
44	Synnøve Solemdal (NOR)	—	—	17	—	—	12	—	19	48
45	Valj Semerenko (UKR)	DNF	DNS	36	—	DNS	—	3	5	44
46	Svetlana Mironova (RUS)	—	—	—	0	0	—	16	25	41
47	Tuuli Tomingas (EST)	—	—	—	0	0	27	13	0	40
48	Kamila Zuk (POL)	—	0	—	0	DNS	34	5	—	39
49	Anna Weidel (GER)	30	8	—	—	—	—	—	—	38
50	Vita Semerenko (UKR)	—	DNS	10	15	—	—	—	11	36
51	Joanne Reid (USA)	0	10	0	—	12	2	9	0	33
52	Caroline Colombo (FRA)	—	—	—	—	19	10	—	3	32
53	Dzinara Alimbekava (BLR)	—	4	—	14	—	—	6	8	32
54	Alexia Runggaldier (ITA)	0	14	—	—	—	17	—	—	31
55	Uliana Kaisheva (RUS)	—	—	—	—	—	30	—	0	30
56	Katharina Innerhofer (AUT)	7	1	—	—	DNS	—	1	20	29
57	Julia Schwaiger (AUT)	0	7	13	—	9	—	0	0	29
58	Kinga Zbylut (POL)	0	—	22	6	—	DNS	—	—	28
59	Yuliia Dzhima (UKR)	17	—	0	—	—	9	DNS	—	26
60	Larisa Kuklina (RUS)	—	—	—	—	14	—	—	12	26
#	Name	POK	HOC	NOV	OBE	ANT	SLC	ÖST	OSL	Total
61	Emma Lunder (CAN)	—	—	6	2	—	0	LAP	17	25
62	Thekla Brun-Lie (NOR)	—	—	—	0	—	4	—	18	22
63	Emma Nilsson (SWE)	3	6	0	—	LAP	—	—	10	19
64	Baiba Bendika (LAT)	0	0	0	0	—	—	18	0	18
65	Johanna Talihärm (EST)	—	—	—	10	—	0	7	0	17
66	Rosanna Crawford (CAN)	—	0	0	0	7	8	LAP	—	15
67	Olena Pidhrushna (UKR)	14	DNF	DNF	—	—	—	—	—	14
68	Elena Kruchinkina (BLR)	—	—	—	—	1	—	0	13	14
69	Karoline Offigstad Knotten (NOR)	—	—	—	13	—	—	—	—	13
70	Sari Maeda (JPN)	—	2	—	—	—	0	11	—	13
71	Irina Kruchinkina (BLR)	LAP	—	0	12	—	—	0	—	12
72	Ivona Fialková (SVK)	—	0	0	0	8	—	4	—	12
73	Lucie Charvátová (CZE)	—	—	7	—	4	—	—	—	11
74	Zhang Yan (CHN)	DNS	0	0	0	DNS	—	10	—	10
75	Yelizaveta Belchenko (KAZ)	0	0	—	—	10	—	—	—	10
76	Valeriia Vasnetcova (RUS)	10	0	—	0	—	DNS	—	—	10
77	Regina Oja (EST)	0	—	0	—	3	7	—	0	10
79	Nadine Horchler (GER)	9	—	—	0	—	—	—	0	9
79	Emilie Ågheim Kalkenberg (NOR)	0	DNS	9	—	—	—	—	—	9
80	Janina Hettich (GER)	—	—	—	—	—	—	—	9	9
81	Viktoria Slivko (RUS)	—	—	—	—	—	—	—	7	7
82	Tang Jialin (CHN)	0	—	0	4	LAP	—	0	—	4
83	Christina Rieder (AUT)	—	—	—	0	0	3	—	0	2
83	Sarah Beaudry (CAN)	—	—	3	—	0	0	0	—	3
84	Hanna Sola (BLR)	—	—	—	3	—	DNS	—	—	3
86	Megan Bankes (CAN)	—	—	—	—	2	—	LAP	0	2
87	Ingela Andersson (SWE)	—	—	—	—	—	—	—	1	1
