= Biathlon World Championships 2019 – Women's relay =

Women's relay at the Biathlon World Championships 2019
- Venue: Östersund Ski Stadium
- Location: Östersund, Sweden
- Dates: 16 March
- Competitors: 92 from 23 nations
- Teams: 23
- Winning time: 1:12:00.1

Medalists
gold medal	Synnøve Solemdal; Ingrid Landmark Tandrevold; Tiril Eckhoff; Marte Olsbu Røiseland	Norway
silver medal	Linn Persson; Mona Brorsson; Anna Magnusson; Hanna Öberg	Sweden
bronze medal	Anastasiya Merkushyna; Vita Semerenko; Yuliia Dzhima; Valentyna Semerenko	Ukraine

The women's relay competition at the Biathlon World Championships 2019 was held on 16 March 2019.

== Results ==
The race was started at 13:15.

Rank	Bib	Team	Time	Penalties (P+S)	Deficit
1st place, gold medalist(s)	3	Norway; Synnøve Solemdal; Ingrid Landmark Tandrevold; Tiril Eckhoff; Marte Olsbu Røiseland	1:12:00.1; 17:46.8; 17:46.8; 18:31.9; 17:48.8	0+5 1+3; 0+2 0+0; 0+0 0+0; 0+2 1+3; 0+1 0+0	
2nd place, silver medalist(s)	5	Sweden; Linn Persson; Mona Brorsson; Anna Magnusson; Hanna Öberg	1:12:24.4; 17:27.0; 18:08.4; 17:52.8; 18:56.2	0+2 0+4; 0+0 0+0; 0+0 0+1; 0+0 0+0; 0+2 0+3	+24.3
3rd place, bronze medalist(s)	10	Ukraine; Anastasiya Merkushyna; Vita Semerenko; Yuliia Dzhima; Valentyna Semerenko	1:12:35.2; 17:18.7; 18:10.1; 18:39.3; 18:27.1	0+2 0+3; 0+0 0+0; 0+1 0+0; 0+0 0+2; 0+1 0+1	+35.1
4	1	Germany; Vanessa Hinz; Franziska Hildebrand; Denise Herrmann; Laura Dahlmeier	1:12:35.7; 18:02.8; 18:47.6; 17:41.3; 18:04.0	0+8 1+6; 0+1 1+3; 0+3 0+1; 0+2 0+2; 0+2 0+0	+35.6
5	4	Russia; Evgeniya Pavlova; Svetlana Mironova; Uliana Kaisheva; Ekaterina Yurlova-Percht	1:12:43.7; 17:37.2; 18:46.1; 18:04.6; 18:15.8	0+4 0+8; 0+0 0+2; 0+3 0+3; 0+1 0+0; 0+0 0+3	+43.6
6	15	Slovakia; Ivona Fialková; Terézia Poliaková; Anastasiya Kuzmina; Paulína Fialková	1:12:53.2; 17:43.2; 19:20.8; 17:42.1; 18:07.1	0+5 0+4; 0+0 0+2; 0+1 0+1; 0+2 0+1; 0+2 0+0	+53.1
7	19	Poland; Kinga Zbylut; Monika Hojnisz; Magdalena Gwizdoń; Kamila Żuk	1:13:47.2; 18:17.4; 18:18.8; 18:45.8; 18:25.2	0+4 0+5; 0+2 0+3; 0+1 0+0; 0+0 0+2; 0+1 0+0	+1:47.1
8	2	France; Anaïs Chevalier; Célia Aymonier; Julia Simon; Justine Braisaz	1:13:57.5; 18:06.6; 19:40.0; 17:54.4; 18:16.5	0+1 3+5; 0+0 0+2; 0+0 3+3; 0+0 0+0; 0+1 0+0	+1:57.4
9	11	United States; Susan Dunklee; Clare Egan; Joanne Reid; Emily Dreissigacker	1:14:22.4; 17:23.4; 17:48.8; 18:33.2; 20:37.0	0+0 2+5; 0+0 0+1; 0+0 0+0; 0+0 0+1; 0+0 2+3	+2:22.3
10	6	Italy; Lisa Vittozzi; Nicole Gontier; Alexia Runggaldier; Federica Sanfilippo	1:14:33.0; 17:13.3; 17:59.4; 20:20.7; 18:59.6	0+4 1+5; 0+1 0+2; 0+0 0+0; 0+0 1+3; 0+3 0+0	+2:32.9
11	8	Belarus; Dzinara Alimbekava; Irina Kruchinkina; Elena Kruchinkina; Iryna Kryuko	1:14:33.2; 18:43.1; 18:48.5; 18:26.4; 18:35.2	1+5 0+4; 1+3 0+1; 0+1 0+0; 0+0 0+2; 0+1 0+1	+2:33.1
12	12	Estonia; Regina Oja; Tuuli Tomingas; Johanna Talihärm; Meril Beilmann	1:15:04.7; 17:49.2; 18:30.8; 19:12.8; 19:31.9	0+6 0+5; 0+1 0+0; 0+1 0+2; 0+2 0+3; 0+2 0+0	+3:04.6
13	9	Switzerland; Aita Gasparin; Elisa Gasparin; Lena Häcki; Selina Gasparin	1:15:25.4; 18:29.1; 18:17.0; 19:19.1; 19:20.2	0+6 2+6; 0+2 0+0; 0+0 0+1; 0+2 2+3; 0+2 0+2	+3:25.3
14	14	Canada; Sarah Beaudry; Emma Lunder; Megan Bankes; Rosanna Crawford	1:15:40.0; 17:50.5; 19:22.8; 19:19.3; 19:07.4	1+6 0+3; 0+1 0+1; 1+3 0+0; 0+2 0+1; 0+0 0+1	+3:39.9
15	7	Czech Republic; Eva Puskarčíková; Jessica Jislová; Markéta Davidová; Veronika Vítková	1:15:52.0; 19:45.1; 18:19.7; 19:14.5; 18:32.7	4+6 0+3; 3+3 0+2; 0+0 0+0; 1+3 0+1; 0+0 0+0	+3:51.9
16	13	Austria; Lisa Theresa Hauser; Julia Schwaiger; Christina Rieder; Katharina Innerhofer	1:16:17.2; 17:50.8; 19:53.0; 19:30.9; 19:02.5	0+5 1+7; 0+0 0+2; 0+1 1+3; 0+2 0+0; 0+2 0+2	+4:17.1
17	16	China; Tang Jialin; Chu Yuanmeng; Meng Fanqi; Zhang Yan	1:16:31.7; 17:53.2; 20:02.0; 19:14.6; 19:21.9	1+4 0+3; 0+0 0+0; 1+3 0+1; 0+0 0+0; 0+1 0+2	+4:31.6
18	23	Kazakhstan; Galina Vishnevskaya; Yelizaveta Belchenko; Lyudmila Akhatova; Anastasiya Kondratyeva	1:17:35.8; 17:55.2; 19:16.8; 19:54.0; 20:29.8	0+5 0+3; 0+0 0+0; 0+1 0+0; 0+1 0+2; 0+3 0+1	+5:35.7
19	18	Japan; Fuyuko Tachizaki; Sari Maeda; Yurie Tanaka; Asuka Hachisuka	1:17:43.3; 18:10.2; 19:04.4; 19:59.8; 20:28.9	0+5 0+6; 0+1 0+2; 0+0 0+2; 0+3 0+1; 0+1 0+1	+5:43.2
20	17	Bulgaria; Daniela Kadeva; Desislava Stoyanova; Milena Todorova; Emilia Yordanova	LAP; 18:20.3; 20:14.8; 20:19.9	2+7 0+5; 0+1 0+2; 2+3 0+0; 0+3 0+3	
21	20	South Korea; Anna Frolina; Kim Seon-su; Ko Eun-jung; Park Ji-ae	LAP; 17:54.0; 20:46.1	0+4 0+1; 0+0 0+0; 0+2 0+1; 0+2 0+0	
22	21	Finland; Suvi Minkkinen; Venla Lehtonen; Sanna Markkanen; Laura Toivanen	LAP; 18:35.3; 20:13.2	0+5 2+9; 0+0 0+3; 0+3 1+3; 0+2 1+3	
23	22	Slovenia; Urška Poje; Polona Klemenčič; Lea Einfalt; Nina Zadravec	LAP; 18:28.2; 20:37.9	3+8 1+6; 0+2 0+0; 2+3 0+3; 1+3 1+3	
