= 2019–20 Biathlon World Cup – Overall Women =

In the women's 2019–20 Biathlon World Cup total score, for each participating athlete the points earned in all Individual, Sprint, Pursuit and Mass start competitions held during the season are added up with the two lowest scores subtracted at the end of the season to give that athlete's final score. This includes the results from the Biathlon World Championships 2020 (held between the World Cup stages in Pokljuka and Nové Město).

== 2018–19 Top 3 standings ==
| Medal | Athlete | Points |
|---|---|---|
| Gold: | (Italy) Dorothea Wierer | 904 |
| Silver: | (Italy) Lisa Vittozzi | 882 |
| Bronze: | (Slovakia) Anastasiya Kuzmina | 870 |

== Events summary ==
| Event | Winner | Second | Third |
|---|---|---|---|
| Östersund 7.5 km Sprint details | Dorothea Wierer; Italy | Marte Olsbu Røiseland; Norway | Markéta Davidová; Czech Republic |
| Östersund 15 km Individual details | Justine Braisaz; France | Yuliia Dzhima; Ukraine | Julia Simon; France |
| Hochfilzen 7.5 km Sprint details | Dorothea Wierer; Italy | Ingrid Landmark Tandrevold; Norway | Svetlana Mironova; Russia |
| Hochfilzen 10 km Pursuit details | Tiril Eckhoff; Norway | Hanna Öberg; Sweden | Ingrid Landmark Tandrevold; Norway |
| Le Grand-Bornand 7.5 km Sprint details | Tiril Eckhoff; Norway | Justine Braisaz; France | Markéta Davidová; Czech Republic |
| Le Grand-Bornand 10 km Pursuit details | Tiril Eckhoff; Norway | Ingrid Landmark Tandrevold; Norway | Lena Häcki; Switzerland |
| Le Grand-Bornand 12.5 km Mass Start details | Tiril Eckhoff; Norway | Dorothea Wierer; Italy | Linn Persson; Sweden |
| Oberhof 7.5 km Sprint details | Marte Olsbu Røiseland; Norway | Denise Herrmann; Germany | Julia Simon; France |
| Oberhof 12.5 km Mass Start details | Kaisa Mäkäräinen; Finland | Tiril Eckhoff; Norway | Marte Olsbu Røiseland; Norway |
| Ruhpolding 7.5 km Sprint details | Tiril Eckhoff; Norway | Hanna Öberg; Sweden | Dorothea Wierer; Italy |
| Ruhpolding 10 km Pursuit details | Tiril Eckhoff; Norway | Paulína Fialková; Slovakia | Hanna Öberg; Sweden |
| Pokljuka 15 km Individual details | Denise Herrmann; Germany | Hanna Öberg; Sweden | Anaïs Bescond; France |
| Pokljuka 12.5 km Mass Start details | Hanna Öberg; Sweden | Lisa Vittozzi; Italy | Anaïs Bescond; France |
| World Championships 7.5 km Sprint details | Marte Olsbu Røiseland; Norway | Susan Dunklee; United States | Lucie Charvátová; Czech Republic |
| World Championships 10 km Pursuit details | Dorothea Wierer; Italy | Denise Herrmann; Germany | Marte Olsbu Røiseland; Norway |
| World Championships 15 km Individual details | Dorothea Wierer; Italy | Vanessa Hinz; Germany | Marte Olsbu Røiseland; Norway |
| World Championships 12.5 km Mass Start details | Marte Olsbu Røiseland; Norway | Dorothea Wierer; Italy | Hanna Öberg; Sweden |
| Nové Město 7.5 km Sprint details | Denise Herrmann; Germany | Anaïs Bescond; France | Markéta Davidová; Czech Republic |
| Nové Město 12.5 km Mass Start details | Tiril Eckhoff; Norway | Hanna Öberg; Sweden | Franziska Preuß; Germany |
| Kontiolahti 7.5 km Sprint details | Denise Herrmann; Germany | Franziska Preuß; Germany | Tiril Eckhoff; Norway |
| Kontiolahti 10 km Pursuit [details] | Julia Simon; France | Selina Gasparin; Switzerland | Lisa Vittozzi; Italy |
| Oslo Holmenkollen 7.5 km Sprint | Cancelled due to the coronavirus pandemic | | |
| Oslo Holmenkollen 10 km Pursuit | Cancelled due to the coronavirus pandemic | | |
| Oslo Holmenkollen 12.5 km Mass Start | Cancelled due to the coronavirus pandemic | | |

== Standings ==
Point system
| Place | IN | SP | PU | MS |
|---|---|---|---|---|
| 1 | 60 | | | |
| 2 | 54 | | | |
| 3 | 48 | | | |
| 4 | 43 | | | |
| 5 | 40 | | | |
| 6 | 38 | | | |
| 7 | 36 | | | |
| 8 | 34 | | | |
| 9 | 32 | | | |
| 10 | 31 | | | |
| 11 | 30 | | | |
| 12 | 29 | | | |
| 13 | 28 | | | |
| 14 | 27 | | | |
| 15 | 26 | | | |
| 16 | 25 | | | |
| 17 | 24 | | | |
| 18 | 23 | | | |
| 19 | 22 | | | |
| 20 | 21 | | | |
| 21 | 20 | | | |
| 22 | 19 | | | 18 |
| 23 | 18 | | | 16 |
| 24 | 17 | | | 14 |
| 25 | 16 | | | 12 |
| 26 | 15 | | | 10 |
| 27 | 14 | | | 8 |
| 28 | 13 | | | 6 |
| 29 | 12 | | | 4 |
| 30 | 11 | | | 2 |
| 31 | 10 | | | — |
| 32 | 9 | | | — |
| 33 | 8 | | | — |
| 34 | 7 | | | — |
| 35 | 6 | | | — |
| 36 | 5 | | | — |
| 37 | 4 | | | — |
| 38 | 3 | | | — |
| 39 | 2 | | | — |
| 40 | 1 | | | — |

In each event places 1 to 40 (1 to 30 in a Mass start) are awarded points, a victory being worth 60 points. The full point system is shown in the table on the right. In a Mass start event only 30 athletes are allowed to participate and the points awarded for ranks 22 to 30 differ from the system used in other events. Equal placings (ties) give an equal number of points. An athlete's total World Cup Score is the sum of all World Cup points earned in the season, minus the points from 2 events in which the athlete got their worst scores. Ties in this score are broken by comparing the tied athletes' number of victories. If this number is the same for the athletes in question, the number of second places is compared, and so on. If a tie cannot be broken by this procedure, it remains a tie.

| # | Name | ÖST SP | ÖST IN | HOC SP | HOC PU | LGB SP | LGB PU | LGB MS | OBE SP | OBE MS | RUH SP | RUH PU | POK IN | POK MS | ANT SP | ANT PU | ANT IN | ANT MS | NOV SP | NOV MS | KON SP | KON PU | OSL SP | OSL PU | OSL MS | Total |
|---|---|---|---|---|---|---|---|---|---|---|---|---|---|---|---|---|---|---|---|---|---|---|---|---|---|---|
| 1. | Dorothea Wierer (ITA) | 60 | 36 | 60 | 32 | 19 | 43 | 54 | 43 | 43 | 48 | 21 | ~~18~~ | 32 | 36 | 60 | 60 | 54 | ~~17~~ | 40 | 22 | 30 | — | — | — | 793 |
| 2 | Tiril Eckhoff (NOR) | 1 | 12 | 34 | 60 | 60 | 60 | 60 | 40 | 54 | 60 | 60 | 23 | — | 0 | 21 | 26 | 36 | 40 | 60 | 48 | 31 | — | — | — | 786 |
| 3 | Denise Herrmann (GER) | 38 | 23 | 0 | 0 | 40 | 38 | 40 | 54 | 40 | 22 | 38 | 60 | 26 | 40 | 54 | 29 | 29 | 60 | 29 | 60 | 25 | — | — | — | 745 |
| 4 | Hanna Öberg (SWE) | 30 | 31 | 40 | 54 | 27 | DNS | — | 20 | 38 | 54 | 48 | 54 | 60 | 23 | 43 | 43 | 48 | 38 | 54 | 13 | 23 | — | — | — | 741 |
| 5 | Marte Olsbu Røiseland (NOR) | 54 | 22 | 36 | 24 | — | — | — | 60 | 48 | 38 | 32 | 29 | 38 | 60 | 48 | 48 | 60 | — | — | — | — | — | — | — | 597 |
| 6 | Franziska Preuß (GER) | 43 | 29 | 0 | DNS | 29 | 36 | 34 | — | — | 27 | 29 | 40 | — | 34 | 36 | 40 | 34 | 28 | 48 | 54 | 32 | — | — | — | 573 |
| 7 | Ingrid Landmark Tandrevold (NOR) | 16 | 43 | 54 | 48 | 38 | 54 | 29 | ~~7~~ | 16 | 9 | 27 | 9 | 34 | 0 | 27 | 25 | 25 | 16 | 23 | 32 | 29 | — | — | — | 554 |
| 8 | Julia Simon (FRA) | 24 | 48 | 23 | 28 | 34 | 32 | 24 | 48 | 24 | 36 | 18 | 16 | 30 | 0 | ~~6~~ | 10 | 40 | 16 | 10 | 30 | 60 | — | — | — | 551 |
| 9 | Justine Braisaz (FRA) | 0 | 60 | 16 | 43 | 54 | 40 | 21 | 13 | 14 | 19 | 30 | 30 | 40 | 9 | ~~4~~ | 22 | 18 | 31 | 43 | 24 | 20 | — | — | — | 547 |
| 10 | Lisa Vittozzi (ITA) | 0 | 32 | 18 | 16 | 26 | 26 | 25 | 21 | 32 | 32 | 0 | 43 | 54 | 38 | 14 | 0 | 2 | 36 | 22 | 43 | 48 | — | — | — | 528 |
| 11 | Kaisa Mäkäräinen (FIN) | 0 | 28 | 28 | 36 | 0 | 22 | 43 | 30 | 60 | 8 | 26 | 0 | 29 | 1 | 19 | 20 | 27 | 27 | 36 | 23 | 43 | — | — | — | 506 |
| 12 | Monika Hojnisz-Staręga (POL) | 21 | 34 | DNF | — | 0 | — | — | 34 | 27 | 24 | 36 | 24 | 43 | 13 | 15 | 38 | 43 | 32 | 38 | 38 | 40 | — | — | — | 500 |
| 13 | Paulína Fialková (SVK) | 0 | — | 43 | 40 | 31 | 31 | 27 | 38 | 21 | 40 | 54 | 0 | 28 | 25 | 24 | 17 | 26 | 14 | 30 | 0 | — | — | — | — | 489 |
| 14 | Markéta Davidová (CZE) | 48 | 30 | 6 | 17 | 48 | 13 | 18 | 18 | 29 | 0 | — | 2 | 31 | 4 | 16 | 34 | 21 | 48 | 21 | 40 | 34 | — | — | — | 478 |
| 15 | Anaïs Bescond (FRA) | 20 | 0 | 31 | 38 | 0 | — | 36 | 10 | 30 | 2 | 0 | 48 | 48 | 21 | 30 | 0 | 31 | 54 | 27 | 0 | 24 | — | — | — | 450 |
| 16 | Vanessa Hinz (GER) | 6 | 11 | 0 | 29 | 0 | — | — | 26 | 12 | 34 | 20 | 26 | 14 | 27 | 40 | 54 | 24 | 13 | 20 | 20 | 18 | — | — | — | 394 |
| 17 | Ekaterina Yurlova-Percht (RUS) | 0 | 25 | 15 | 19 | 23 | 25 | 38 | — | — | 4 | 0 | 6 | 20 | 20 | 29 | 28 | 38 | 30 | 24 | 0 | 19 | — | — | — | 363 |
| 18 | Lisa Theresa Hauser (AUT) | 27 | 3 | 30 | 2 | 28 | 11 | 32 | — | — | 6 | 0 | 36 | 36 | 24 | 34 | 0 | 32 | 26 | 25 | 0 | DNS | — | — | — | 352 |
| 19 | Linn Persson (SWE) | 40 | 24 | 20 | 21 | 0 | 30 | 48 | 14 | 28 | 14 | 40 | — | — | 0 | 9 | 0 | — | 18 | 26 | 0 | 14 | — | — | — | 346 |
| 20 | Mona Brorsson (SWE) | 19 | 26 | 12 | 25 | 21 | 4 | 31 | 0 | 18 | 30 | 28 | — | — | 8 | 12 | 23 | — | 0 | 28 | 16 | 38 | — | — | — | 339 |
| 21 | Larisa Kuklina (RUS) | 23 | 40 | 0 | — | 13 | 27 | 8 | 11 | 2 | 5 | 22 | 28 | — | 0 | 18 | 18 | — | 25 | 31 | 36 | 28 | — | — | — | 335 |
| 22 | Lena Häcki (SUI) | 34 | 38 | 21 | 12 | 30 | 48 | 6 | 0 | 34 | 17 | 16 | 0 | 27 | 0 | — | 0 | — | 0 | 18 | 0 | — | — | — | — | 301 |
| 23 | Svetlana Mironova (RUS) | 26 | 0 | 48 | 30 | 43 | 21 | 12 | 22 | 4 | 0 | — | 0 | 22 | 3 | 20 | 19 | — | — | — | 0 | 0 | — | — | — | 270 |
| 24 | Elvira Öberg (SWE) | 29 | 5 | 14 | 18 | 12 | 5 | 16 | 8 | 6 | 21 | 9 | — | — | 28 | 0 | 27 | 10 | 34 | 4 | 0 | 22 | — | — | — | 268 |
| 25 | Olena Pidhrushna (UKR) | — | — | 29 | 26 | 32 | 29 | 22 | 5 | 23 | 1 | DNS | 1 | — | 43 | 28 | — | 14 | 0 | — | 0 | DNS | — | — | — | 253 |
| 26 | Katharina Innerhofer (AUT) | 36 | 4 | 17 | 7 | 7 | 7 | — | 31 | 31 | 0 | 0 | 8 | 18 | 22 | 13 | 21 | 22 | 0 | 8 | 0 | — | — | — | — | 252 |
| 27 | Lucie Charvátová (CZE) | 11 | 0 | 38 | 11 | 20 | 0 | 30 | 0 | 8 | 26 | 11 | 0 | 6 | 48 | 0 | 0 | 4 | 2 | — | 18 | 13 | — | — | — | 246 |
| 28 | Célia Aymonier (FRA) | 32 | 0 | 1 | 31 | 0 | — | — | 15 | — | 0 | — | 13 | — | 26 | 11 | 13 | 30 | 19 | — | 28 | 27 | — | — | — | 246 |
| 29 | Iryna Kryuko (BLR) | 0 | 0 | 8 | 15 | 36 | 34 | 20 | 28 | 36 | 0 | 19 | DNF | 23 | 0 | 0 | 11 | — | 0 | 12 | — | — | — | — | — | 242 |
| 30 | Mari Eder (FIN) | 18 | 0 | 4 | 0 | 16 | 17 | 28 | 29 | 25 | 0 | — | 25 | 16 | 0 | — | 0 | — | 43 | 16 | 0 | 0 | — | — | — | 237 |
| # | Name | ÖST SP | ÖST IN | HOC SP | HOC PU | LGB SP | LGB PU | LGB MS | OBE SP | OBE MS | RUH SP | RUH PU | POK IN | POK MS | ANT SP | ANT PU | ANT IN | ANT MS | NOV SP | NOV MS | KON SP | KON PU | OSL SP | OSL PU | OSL MS | Total |
| 31 | Aita Gasparin (SUI) | 0 | 0 | 0 | DNF | 8 | 23 | 14 | 0 | — | 0 | 0 | 32 | 25 | 31 | 31 | 14 | 20 | 11 | — | 19 | 4 | — | — | — | 232 |
| 32 | Baiba Bendika (LAT) | 7 | 0 | 5 | 13 | 0 | 14 | — | 0 | — | 18 | 15 | 17 | — | 29 | 32 | 16 | 23 | 0 | — | 26 | 12 | — | — | — | 227 |
| 33 | Valj Semerenko (UKR) | 17 | 0 | 32 | 27 | 0 | 3 | — | 16 | — | 0 | 23 | — | — | 5 | 0 | 0 | — | 29 | 32 | 27 | 11 | — | — | — | 222 |
| 34 | Emma Lunder (CAN) | 0 | DNS | 0 | 4 | 5 | 16 | — | 36 | 26 | 0 | 6 | 31 | 4 | 6 | 0 | 6 | — | 24 | 34 | 5 | 10 | — | — | — | 213 |
| 35 | Eva Kristejn Puskarčíková (CZE) | 22 | 18 | 9 | 34 | 0 | — | 26 | 24 | — | DNS | — | 3 | 8 | 17 | 0 | 31 | 16 | 0 | — | 0 | 0 | — | — | — | 208 |
| 36 | Yuliia Dzhima (UKR) | — | 54 | 0 | DNS | 3 | 18 | — | 25 | — | 12 | DNF | 27 | 12 | 19 | 22 | 4 | — | 9 | — | 0 | DNS | — | — | — | 205 |
| 37 | Karolin Horchler (GER) | 0 | 0 | 0 | — | — | — | — | — | — | 3 | 24 | 21 | 2 | 18 | 26 | 15 | 28 | 10 | — | 29 | 15 | — | — | — | 191 |
| 38 | Kamila Żuk (POL) | 13 | 0 | 25 | 9 | 25 | 0 | — | 32 | 22 | 31 | 0 | 0 | 24 | 0 | DNS | 0 | — | — | — | 0 | — | — | — | — | 181 |
| 39 | Susan Dunklee (USA) | 9 | 0 | 0 | — | 0 | — | — | 27 | 20 | 16 | 31 | 0 | — | 54 | 5 | 0 | 8 | 6 | — | — | — | — | — | — | 176 |
| 40 | Selina Gasparin (SUI) | 0 | 19 | 0 | 14 | 15 | 1 | — | 23 | — | 0 | — | 0 | — | 16 | 1 | 0 | — | 0 | — | 31 | 54 | — | — | — | 174 |
| 41 | Vita Semerenko (UKR) | 31 | 13 | 0 | 6 | 0 | 19 | — | 0 | — | 7 | 34 | — | — | 30 | 2 | 12 | — | 0 | — | 11 | 6 | — | — | — | 171 |
| 42 | Karoline Offigstad Knotten (NOR) | 4 | 17 | 20 | 20 | 22 | 28 | 10 | 0 | 10 | 0 | 8 | 0 | — | 0 | — | — | — | 0 | — | — | — | — | — | — | 139 |
| 43 | Clare Egan (USA) | 3 | 6 | 0 | — | 0 | 12 | — | 9 | — | 13 | 25 | 38 | 10 | 15 | 0 | 0 | — | 8 | — | — | — | — | — | — | 139 |
| 44 | Ivona Fialková (SVK) | 14 | 0 | 10 | 0 | 0 | 0 | — | 0 | — | 0 | 0 | 0 | — | 32 | 38 | 1 | 12 | 0 | — | 21 | DNS | — | — | — | 128 |
| 45 | Johanna Skottheim (SWE) | — | — | — | — | — | — | — | 0 | — | 28 | 43 | 0 | — | — | — | 0 | — | 7 | — | 1 | 36 | — | — | — | 115 |
| 46 | Irina Starykh (RUS) | — | — | — | — | — | — | — | 0 | — | 0 | 14 | 34 | 21 | 0 | 17 | 9 | — | 1 | — | 17 | 0 | — | — | — | 113 |
| 47 | Milena Todorova (BUL) | 0 | 2 | 0 | — | 0 | DNS | — | 0 | — | 0 | 0 | — | — | 14 | 23 | 24 | 6 | 23 | 14 | — | — | — | — | — | 106 |
| 48 | Christina Rieder (AUT) | 0 | 0 | 0 | 0 | 4 | 0 | — | 0 | — | 0 | — | 20 | — | 0 | 10 | 36 | — | 22 | 2 | 7 | DNS | — | — | — | 101 |
| 49 | Elena Kruchinkina (BLR) | 10 | 0 | 0 | — | — | — | — | 6 | — | 25 | 4 | 5 | — | 0 | LAP | 0 | — | 0 | — | 25 | 21 | — | — | — | 96 |
| 50 | Anastasiya Merkushyna (UKR) | 0 | 10 | — | — | — | — | — | 0 | — | — | — | 4 | — | — | — | 30 | — | 20 | — | 9 | 17 | — | — | — | 90 |
| 51 | Synnøve Solemdal (NOR) | — | — | 0 | — | 9 | 15 | — | 4 | — | 11 | 17 | 12 | — | — | — | 0 | — | — | — | 4 | 16 | — | — | — | 88 |
| 52 | Thekla Brun-Lie (NOR) | — | 0 | 2 | 0 | 17 | 20 | 23 | — | — | 15 | 0 | — | — | — | — | — | — | — | — | — | — | — | — | — | 77 |
| 53 | Chloé Chevalier (FRA) | 2 | 15 | 0 | 0 | 2 | 8 | — | 3 | — | 0 | 5 | 0 | — | — | — | — | — | 0 | — | 34 | 7 | — | — | — | 76 |
| 54 | Regina Oja (EST) | 0 | 0 | 0 | — | 14 | 0 | — | 0 | — | 0 | — | 0 | — | 11 | 0 | 0 | — | 21 | 6 | 14 | 5 | — | — | — | 71 |
| 55 | Elisa Gasparin (SUI) | 5 | 0 | 0 | — | 24 | 0 | DNF | 1 | — | 0 | — | 11 | — | 0 | 25 | 0 | — | 0 | — | 0 | 3 | — | — | — | 69 |
| 56 | Kinga Zbylut (POL) | 0 | 0 | 27 | 22 | 0 | 0 | — | 0 | — | 0 | — | 0 | — | 0 | 7 | 0 | — | 0 | — | 12 | 0 | — | — | — | 68 |
| 57 | Federica Sanfilippo (ITA) | 25 | 0 | 0 | 0 | 0 | — | — | 0 | — | 20 | 0 | 10 | — | 0 | 8 | 0 | — | 0 | — | 2 | 1 | — | — | — | 66 |
| 58 | Kristina Reztsova (RUS) | 0 | 0 | 22 | 23 | 0 | — | — | 0 | — | 0 | 7 | 14 | — | — | — | — | — | 0 | — | 0 | — | — | — | — | 66 |
| 59 | Hanna Sola (BLR) | 0 | — | 11 | 0 | 0 | — | — | 0 | — | 43 | 3 | 0 | — | — | — | — | — | 4 | — | DNS | — | — | — | — | 61 |
| 60 | Darya Blashko (UKR) | 0 | 20 | 0 | — | 11 | 24 | 4 | — | — | 0 | — | 0 | — | — | — | — | — | — | — | — | — | — | — | — | 59 |
| # | Name | ÖST SP | ÖST IN | HOC SP | HOC PU | LGB SP | LGB PU | LGB MS | OBE SP | OBE MS | RUH SP | RUH PU | POK IN | POK MS | ANT SP | ANT PU | ANT IN | ANT MS | NOV SP | NOV MS | KON SP | KON PU | OSL SP | OSL PU | OSL MS | Total |
| 61 | Fuyuko Tachizaki (JPN) | 28 | 0 | 0 | — | 0 | 0 | — | 17 | — | 0 | — | 0 | — | 0 | — | 7 | — | 0 | — | 3 | 0 | — | — | — | 55 |
| 62 | Julia Schwaiger (AUT) | 0 | 21 | 0 | 0 | 0 | — | — | — | — | 0 | 10 | 22 | — | — | — | 0 | — | 0 | — | 0 | — | — | — | — | 53 |
| 63 | Tang Jialin (CHN) | 0 | 0 | 0 | 0 | 10 | 6 | — | 0 | — | 23 | 0 | — | — | 0 | — | 3 | — | 0 | — | 0 | 9 | — | — | — | 51 |
| 64 | Anna Magnusson (SWE) | — | — | — | — | — | — | — | 0 | — | 29 | 2 | 19 | — | — | — | — | — | 0 | — | 0 | — | — | — | — | 50 |
| 65 | Jessica Jislová (CZE) | 0 | 0 | 24 | 10 | 6 | 0 | — | 0 | — | 0 | — | DNS | — | 0 | — | — | — | 0 | — | 0 | 8 | — | — | — | 48 |
| 66 | Janina Hettich (GER) | — | — | — | — | 18 | 10 | — | 2 | — | 0 | 0 | 15 | — | 0 | — | — | — | 0 | — | 0 | — | — | — | — | 45 |
| 67 | Tamara Voronina (RUS) | 12 | 27 | 0 | 5 | 0 | — | — | — | — | — | — | — | — | — | — | — | — | — | — | — | — | — | — | — | 44 |
| 68 | Emilie Aagheim Kalkenberg (NOR) | 0 | 0 | — | — | — | — | — | — | — | — | — | — | — | — | — | — | — | — | — | 15 | 26 | — | — | — | 41 |
| 69 | Caroline Colombo (FRA) | 0 | 0 | 26 | 3 | 0 | 2 | — | DNS | — | 0 | — | 0 | — | — | — | — | — | — | — | 8 | 0 | — | — | — | 39 |
| 70 | Suvi Minkkinen (FIN) | 0 | 0 | 0 | — | 0 | — | — | 0 | — | 10 | 12 | — | — | 0 | — | 2 | 0 | 5 | — | 6 | 2 | — | — | — | 37 |
| 71 | Galina Vishnevskaya (KAZ) | 0 | 0 | 0 | — | 0 | — | — | 0 | — | 0 | — | 0 | — | 0 | — | 32 | — | 0 | — | 0 | 0 | — | — | — | 32 |
| 72 | Johanna Talihärm (EST) | 15 | 0 | 0 | 0 | 0 | 0 | — | 0 | — | 0 | 1 | 0 | — | 10 | 0 | 0 | — | 0 | — | 0 | — | — | — | — | 26 |
| 73 | Anna Frolina (KOR) | 0 | 0 | 0 | — | 0 | — | — | 19 | — | 0 | 0 | 0 | — | 0 | — | 0 | — | — | — | 0 | 0 | — | — | — | 19 |
| 74 | Dunja Zdouc (AUT) | 0 | 16 | 0 | — | — | — | — | 0 | — | 0 | — | 0 | — | 0 | — | — | — | DNS | — | 0 | DNS | — | — | — | 16 |
| 75 | Lea Einfalt (SLO) | — | 0 | 0 | — | 0 | — | — | 0 | — | 0 | — | 0 | — | 12 | 3 | 0 | — | 0 | — | 0 | — | — | — | — | 15 |
| 76 | Dzinara Alimbekava (BLR) | 0 | 8 | 7 | 0 | 0 | LAP | — | 0 | — | — | — | — | — | 0 | — | — | — | — | — | 0 | — | — | — | — | 15 |
| 77 | Grete Gaim (EST) | 0 | 14 | 0 | — | 0 | — | — | 0 | — | 0 | — | 0 | — | — | — | — | — | — | — | — | — | — | — | — | 14 |
| 78 | Nicole Gontier (ITA) | 0 | 0 | 13 | 1 | 0 | — | — | 0 | — | 0 | — | — | — | — | — | — | — | — | — | — | — | — | — | — | 14 |
| 79 | Maren Hammerschmidt (GER) | — | — | — | — | 0 | — | — | 0 | — | 0 | 13 | 0 | — | — | — | — | — | — | — | — | — | — | — | — | 13 |
| 80 | Chu Yuanmeng (CHN) | — | — | 3 | 0 | 1 | 9 | — | 0 | — | 0 | 0 | — | — | 0 | — | 0 | — | 0 | — | 0 | 0 | — | — | — | 13 |
| 81 | Joanne Reid (USA) | 0 | DNS | 0 | — | 0 | 0 | — | — | — | — | — | 0 | — | 0 | — | 0 | — | 12 | — | — | — | — | — | — | 12 |
| 82 | Anastasiia Porshneva (RUS) | — | — | — | — | — | — | — | 12 | — | — | — | — | — | — | — | — | — | — | — | — | — | — | — | — | 12 |
| 83 | Susanna Meinen (SUI) | — | — | — | — | — | — | — | — | — | — | — | — | — | — | — | — | — | — | — | 10 | 0 | — | — | — | 10 |
| 84 | Ingela Andersson (SWE) | 0 | 9 | — | — | — | — | — | — | — | — | — | — | — | — | — | — | — | — | — | — | — | — | — | — | 9 |
| 85 | Nadia Moser (CAN) | 0 | 0 | 0 | — | DNS | — | — | — | — | 0 | — | 0 | — | 0 | 0 | 8 | — | 0 | — | 0 | 0 | — | — | — | 8 |
| 86 | Franziska Hildebrand (GER) | 0 | 0 | 0 | 8 | — | — | — | 0 | — | — | — | — | — | — | — | — | — | 0 | — | — | — | — | — | — | 8 |
| 87 | Megan Bankes (CAN) | 8 | — | 0 | — | 0 | — | — | DNS | — | 0 | — | 0 | — | 0 | — | 0 | — | 0 | — | — | — | — | — | — | 8 |
| 88 | Elisabeth Högberg (SWE) | — | — | 0 | 0 | 0 | DNS | — | — | — | — | — | 7 | — | — | — | — | — | — | — | — | — | — | — | — | 7 |
| 89 | Natalja Kocergina (LTU) | 0 | 0 | 0 | 0 | 0 | — | — | 0 | — | 0 | — | 0 | — | 7 | 0 | 0 | — | 0 | — | 0 | — | — | — | — | 7 |
| 90 | Anastassiya Kondratyeva (KAZ) | 0 | 7 | 0 | — | 0 | — | — | 0 | — | 0 | — | 0 | — | 0 | — | 0 | — | 0 | — | 0 | — | — | — | — | 7 |
| # | Name | ÖST SP | ÖST IN | HOC SP | HOC PU | LGB SP | LGB PU | LGB MS | OBE SP | OBE MS | RUH SP | RUH PU | POK IN | POK MS | ANT SP | ANT PU | ANT IN | ANT MS | NOV SP | NOV MS | KON SP | KON PU | OSL SP | OSL PU | OSL MS | Total |
| 91 | Daniela Kadeva (BUL) | 0 | 0 | 0 | — | 0 | — | — | 0 | — | 0 | — | 0 | — | 0 | — | 5 | — | 0 | — | 0 | — | — | — | — | 5 |
| 92 | Fanqi Meng (CHN) | 0 | 0 | — | — | 0 | — | — | — | — | 0 | — | 0 | — | 2 | 0 | — | — | 3 | — | 0 | — | — | — | — | 5 |
| 93 | Emma Nilsson (SWE) | 0 | 1 | 0 | — | 0 | 0 | — | — | — | — | — | — | — | — | — | — | — | — | — | — | — | — | — | — | 1 |
