= Biathlon World Championships 2019 – Women's mass start =

Women's mass start at the Biathlon World Championships 2019
- Venue: Östersund Ski Stadium
- Location: Östersund, Sweden
- Dates: 17 March
- Competitors: 30 from 15 nations
- Winning time: 37:26.4

Medalists
gold medal	Dorothea Wierer	Italy
silver medal	Ekaterina Yurlova-Percht	Russia
bronze medal	Denise Herrmann	Germany

The women's mass start competition at the Biathlon World Championships 2019 was held on 17 March 2019.

== Results ==
The race was started at 13:15.

Rank	Bib	Name	Nationality	Time	Penalties (P+P+S+S)	Deficit
1st place, gold medalist(s)	9	Dorothea Wierer	Italy	37:26.4	2 (0+0+0+2)	
2nd place, silver medalist(s)	18	Ekaterina Yurlova-Percht	Russia	37:31.3	2 (0+0+1+1)	+4.9
3rd place, bronze medalist(s)	2	Denise Herrmann	Germany	37:41.8	4 (0+1+2+1)	+15.4
4	3	Hanna Öberg	Sweden	38:19.1	3 (0+1+2+0)	+52.7
5	5	Tiril Eckhoff	Norway	38:24.1	4 (1+1+1+1)	+57.7
6	7	Laura Dahlmeier	Germany	38:29.8	4 (2+1+0+1)	+1:03.4
7	10	Marte Olsbu Røiseland	Norway	38:36.5	4 (1+0+1+2)	+1:10.1
8	6	Lisa Vittozzi	Italy	38:37.6	4 (3+1+0+0)	+1:11.2
9	27	Linn Persson	Sweden	38:56.1	3 (1+1+1+0)	+1:29.7
10	28	Joanne Reid	United States	38:58.5	4 (1+1+1+1)	+1:32.1
11	4	Ingrid Landmark Tandrevold	Norway	39:07.1	5 (0+0+3+2)	+1:40.7
12	12	Paulína Fialková	Slovakia	39:09.1	5 (2+0+1+2)	+1:42.7
13	13	Monika Hojnisz	Poland	39:09.8	3 (0+0+1+2)	+1:43.4
14	17	Mona Brorsson	Sweden	39:15.1	5 (1+2+1+1)	+1:48.7
15	8	Justine Braisaz	France	39:17.1	6 (2+0+1+3)	+1:50.7
16	20	Markéta Davidová	Czech Republic	39:21.9	5 (0+2+2+1)	+1:55.5
17	24	Veronika Vítková	Czech Republic	39:31.9	4 (1+1+1+1)	+2:05.5
18	26	Evgeniya Pavlova	Russia	39:40.0	4 (1+1+1+1)	+2:13.6
19	15	Franziska Preuß	Germany	39:41.6	6 (0+0+5+1)	+2:15.2
20	21	Célia Aymonier	France	39:45.8	6 (0+1+3+2)	+2:19.4
21	16	Franziska Hildebrand	Germany	39:56.0	5 (0+1+1+3)	+2:29.6
22	29	Selina Gasparin	Switzerland	39:59.9	4 (1+2+0+1)	+2:33.5
23	11	Kaisa Mäkäräinen	Finland	40:01.1	6 (0+1+1+4)	+2:34.7
24	14	Iryna Kryuko	Belarus	40:02.7	6 (0+0+4+2)	+2:36.3
25	19	Anastasiya Merkushyna	Ukraine	40:19.3	6 (2+0+3+1)	+2:52.9
26	22	Clare Egan	United States	40:27.8	5 (0+0+3+2)	+3:01.4
27	30	Baiba Bendika	Latvia	40:55.3	5 (1+2+0+2)	+3:28.9
28	1	Anastasiya Kuzmina	Slovakia	42:10.5	10 (4+4+1+1)	+4:44.1
29	25	Elisa Gasparin	Switzerland	43:54.6	7 (1+2+1+3)	+6:28.2
30	23	Lena Häcki	Switzerland	44:39.8	11 (3+3+2+3)	+7:13.4
