= Dorothea Wierer =

Former Italian biathlete (born 1990)

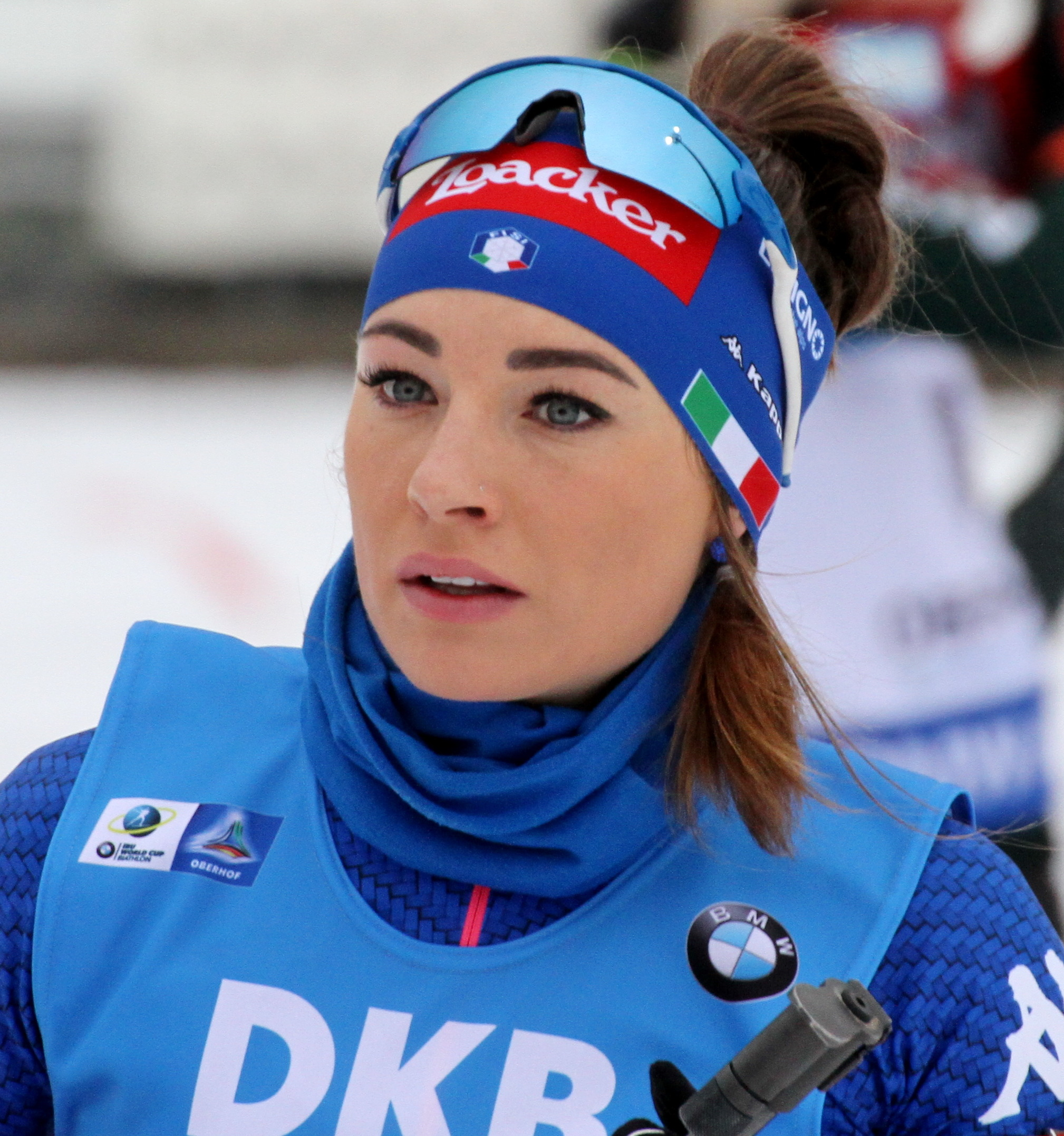
- Wierer in 2018

Personal information
- Nationality: Italian
- Born: 3 April 1990 (age 36) Bruneck, Italy
- Height: 1.58 m (5 ft 2 in)

Sport

Professional information
- Sport: Biathlon
- Club: Fiamme Gialle
- Skis: Rossignol
- Rifle: Anschütz
- World Cup debut: 2009

Olympic Games
- Teams: 4 (2014, 2018, 2022, 2026)
- Medals: 4 (0 gold)

World Championships
- Teams: 12 (2011–2025)
- Medals: 12 (4 gold)

World Cup
- Seasons: 17 (2008/09, 2010/11–2025/26)
- Individual races: 310 (Note: Including races at the Biathlon WCH that were part of the WC until 2022/23 season, 15 races at WOG not counted, 9 races at the WCH not counted)
- All races: 401 (Note: Including races at the Biathlon WCH that were part of the WC until 2022/23 season, 23 races at WOG not counted, 16 races at the WCH not counted)
- Individual victories: 17 (Note: Including 3 wins at the Biathlon WCH that were part of the WC)
- All victories: 23 (Note: Including 3 wins at the Biathlon WCH that were part of the WC, 1 win at the Biathlon WCH not counted)
- Individual podiums: 52 (Note: Including 5 podiums at the Biathlon WCH that were part of the WC, 1 podium at the WOG not counted)
- All podiums: 82 (Note: Including 10 podiums at the Biathlon WCH that were part of the WC, 4 podiums at the WOG not counted, 2 podiums at the WCH not counted)
- Overall titles: 2 (2018–19;2019-20)
- Discipline titles: 4: 2 Individual (2015–16, 2020-21); 1 Pursuit (2018–19); 1 Mass Start (2019–20)
Medal record
Event	1st	2nd	3rd
Olympic Games	0	1	3
World Championships	4	5	3
Total	4	6	6
Women's biathlon
Representing Italy
Olympic Games
Silver medal – second place	2026 Milano Cortina	Mixed relay
Bronze medal – third place	2014 Sochi	Mixed relay
Bronze medal – third place	2018 Pyeongchang	Mixed relay
Bronze medal – third place	2022 Beijing	7.5 km sprint
World Championships
Gold medal – first place	2019 Östersund	12.5 km mass start
Gold medal – first place	2020 Antholz	10 km pursuit
Gold medal – first place	2020 Antholz	15 km individual
Gold medal – first place	2023 Oberhof	4 × 6 km relay
Silver medal – second place	2016 Oslo	10 km pursuit
Silver medal – second place	2019 Östersund	Single mixed relay
Silver medal – second place	2020 Antholz	12.5 km mass start
Silver medal – second place	2020 Antholz	Mixed relay
Silver medal – second place	2023 Oberhof	Mixed relay
Bronze medal – third place	2013 Nové Město	4×6 km relay
Bronze medal – third place	2015 Kontiolahti	4×6 km relay
Bronze medal – third place	2019 Östersund	Mixed relay
Junior World Championships
Gold medal – first place	2011 Nové Město	12.5 km individual
Gold medal – first place	2011 Nové Město	7.5 km sprint
Gold medal – first place	2011 Nové Město	10 km pursuit
Silver medal – second place	2011 Nové Město	3 × 6 km relay
Youth World Championships
Gold medal – first place	2008 Ruhpolding	10 km individual
Gold medal – first place	2009 Canmore	7.5 km pursuit
Bronze medal – third place	2008 Ruhpolding	3 × 6 km relay
Bronze medal – third place	2009 Canmore	3 × 6 km relay
European Championships
Bronze medal – third place	2011 Ridnaun	4×6 km relay
- Updated on 24 Feb 2026

Dorothea Wierer (Italian: [doroˈtɛːa ˈviːrer], German: [doʁoˈteːa ˈviːʁɐ]; born 3 April 1990) is an Italian former biathlete. Together with Karin Oberhofer, Dominik Windisch and Lukas Hofer she won a bronze medal in the Mixed relay at the 2014 Winter Olympics, in Sochi, Russia. At the 2018 Winter Olympics in Pyeongchang, South Korea she won again the bronze medal in the Mixed relay with Lisa Vittozzi, Lukas Hofer and Dominik Windisch. At the 2022 Winter Olympics in Beijing, China, she won her first individual medal in the Sprint. She is the 2019 Mass Start World Champion and the 2020 Pursuit and Individual World Champion.

== Career ==
Wierer won her first Biathlon World Championships medal, placing third in the Women's relay together with Nicole Gontier, Michela Ponza and Karin Oberhofer at the Biathlon World Championships 2013 in Nové Město na Moravě, which was the first ever medal for Italian women at the Biathlon World Championships. At the 2019 Championships in Östersund, she won the gold medal in the 12.5 km Mass Start, also a first for Italian women in Biathlon. She has currently won 12 medals in total, including 4 Golds, 5 Silvers and 3 Bronzes.

At the start of the 2015–16 season, Wierer recorded the first win in her career in the Biathlon World Cup in Östersund and as of the end of 2021–22 season, Wierer has finished on the podium 45 times with 13 wins. She has also finished on the podium in 23 relays, including five victories. She has won the 2018–19 Overall World Cup (first Italian to do so, including men). Wierer defended the overall title in the 2019–20 Season (the first woman to do since Magdalena Forsberg in 2001/02 (Note: On 21 December 2021, Tora Berger was jointly awarded the 2013-14 Biathlon World Cup after the disqualification of Olga Zaitseva, so Berger also won 2 Overall in a row after her win in 2012-13. However, it wasn't the case in March 2020. "IBU EB AWARDS TOTAL SCORE CRYSTAL GLOBE 2013/2014 TO TORA BERGER AND KAISA MAKARAINEN". biathlonworld.com. 21 December 2021.)) and has also won 4 disciplines cup, the 2015–16 Individual World Cup, the 2018–19 Pursuit World Cup, the 2019–20 Mass Start World Cup and the 2020-21 Individual World Cup.

In February 2019, Wierer became the third biathlete (after French Martin Fourcade and Marie Dorin Habert) to achieve a victory in every (Note: This means every discipline at the World Cup / World Championships level as of the 2018–19 season; this includes Individual, Sprint, Pursuit, Mass Start, Women's Relay, Mixed Relay, and Single Mixed Relay. Later at the 2019 World Championships, Johannes Thingnes Bø achieved the same feature, while Sturla Holm Lægreid did that in March 2022. Ole Einar Bjørndalen has also won in 7 different disciplines at the World Cup / World Championships level (Individual, Sprint, Pursuit, Mass Start, Men's Relay, Mixed Relay, and the Team event which has not been raced since 1998); however, he never competed in a Single Mixed Relay during the later stages of his career. Halvard Hanevold also won in the same disciplines and retired before the introduction of Single Mixed Relay in 2015.) biathlon discipline.

== Record ==
=== Olympic Games ===
4 Medals (1 Silver, 3 Bronze)

Wierer has won four medals from Olympic Games. In Sochi, she won a bronze medal in the mixed relay. In Pyeongchang, she won another bronze medal in the same discipline, mixed relay. In Beijing she won her first individual medal in Sprint. At the 2026 Winter Olympics, she won a silver medal in the mixed relay event.

Event	Individual	Sprint	Pursuit	Mass start	Relay	Mixed relay
(Russia) 2014 Sochi	DNS	6th	17th	26th	6th	**Bronze**
(South Korea) 2018 Pyeongchang	7th	18th	15th	6th	9th	**Bronze**
(China) 2022 Beijing	18th	**Bronze**	6th	22nd	5th	9th
(Italy) 2026 Milano Cortina	5th	44th	9th	5th	11th	**Silver**

*The mixed relay was added as an event in 2014.

=== World Championships ===
12 Medals (4 Gold, 5 Silver, 3 Bronze)

Event	Individual	Sprint	Pursuit	Mass start	Relay	Mixed relay	Single mixed relay
(Russia) 2011 Khanty-Mansiysk	–	28th	9th	21st	4th	–	—N/a
(Germany) 2012 Ruhpolding	41st	61st	–	–	12th	–	—N/a
(Czech Republic) 2013 Nové Město	58th	21st	30th	–	**Bronze**	4th	—N/a
(Finland) 2015 Kontiolahti	4th	20th	9th	27th	**Bronze**	7th	—N/a
(Norway) 2016 Oslo	8th	5th	**Silver**	20th	7th	8th	—N/a
(Austria) 2017 Hochfilzen	16th	21st	10th	8th	5th	4th	—N/a
(Sweden) 2019 Östersund	8th	10th	20th	**Gold**	–	**Bronze**	**Silver**
(Italy) 2020 Antholz-Anterselva	**Gold**	7th	**Gold**	**Silver**	10th	**Silver**	9th
(Slovenia) 2021 Pokljuka	9th	20th	4th	8th	9th	6th	5th
(Germany) 2023 Oberhof	15th	19th	11th	14th	**Gold**	**Silver**	–
(Czech Republic) 2024 Nové Město	14th	10th	21st	20th	11th	10th	–
(Switzerland) 2025 Lenzerheide	-	21st	DNS	-	7th	7th	7th

*The single mixed relay was added as an event in 2019.

=== Junior/Youth World Championships ===
Event	Age Class	Individual	Sprint	Pursuit	Relay
(Italy) 2007 Martell	Youth (U19)	10th	16th	14th	—
(Germany) 2008 Ruhpolding	Youth (U19)	**Gold**	8th	21st	**Bronze**
(Canada) 2009 Canmore	Youth (U19)	7th	4th	**Gold**	**Bronze**
(Sweden) 2010 Torsby	Junior (U21)	6th	13th	11th	—
(Czech Republic) 2011 Nové Město	Junior (U21)	**Gold**	**Gold**	**Gold**	**Silver**

=== World Cup ===
Season	Age	Overall			Sprint			Pursuit			Individual			Mass start		
Season	Age	Races	Points	Position	Races	Points	Position	Races	Points	Position	Races	Points	Position	Races	Points	Position
2008/09	18	2/26	0	N/A	2/10	0	N/A	0/7	–	–	0/4	–	–	0/5	–	–
2010/11	20	9/26	86	**54th**	5/10	30	58th	3/7	36	46th	0/4	–	–	1/5	20	40th
2011/12	21	16/26	5	**91st**	9/10	5	78th	4/8	–	–	3/3	–	–	0/5	—	—
2012/13	22	17/26	171	**38th**	9/10	63	40th	5/8	87	29th	3/3	21	39th	0/5	—	—
2013/14	23	21/22	399	**16th**	9/9	143	19th	7/8	141	17th	2/2	60	7th	3/3	55	20th
2014/15	24	22/25	745	**7th**	9/10	333	4th	6/7	214	5th	2/3	70	14th	5/5	128	13th
2015/16	25	25/25	944	**3rd**	9/9	327	3rd	8/8	348	2nd	3/3	154	1st	5/5	148	8th
2016/17	26	26/26	719	**5th**	9/9	246	8th	9/9	286	5th	3/3	45	23rd	5/5	156	5th
2017/18	27	22/22	681	**5th**	8/8	228	8th	7/7	264	4th	2/2	60	6th	5/5	131	11th
2018/19	28	25/25	904	**1st**	9/9	330	2nd	8/8	327	1st	3/3	89	7th	5/5	194	2nd
2019/20	29	21/21	793	**1st**	8/8	305	2nd	5/5	186	2nd	3/3	114	2nd	5/5	223	1st
2020/21	30	26/26	821	**5th**	10/10	282	4th	8/8	220	7th	3/3	103	1st	5/5	144	8th
2021/22	31	21/22	577	**9th**	9/9	196	13th	6/7	185	9th	2/2	44	11th	4/4	152	3rd
2022/23	32	20/20	911	**2nd**	7/7	310	2nd	6/6	285	3rd	3/3	143	5th	4/4	169	4th
2023/24	33	7/21	150	**40th**	3/7	48	43rd	2/7	51	39th	2/3	51	18th	0/4	/	/
2024/25	34	19/21	446	**13th**	7/7	206	9th	6/6	138	13th	2/3	0	/	4/5	106	15th
2025/26	35	12/21	456	**13th**	4/7	168	10th	4/7	133	15th	2/3	106	5th	2/4	49	27th

Updated as of 22 March 2026, all the point totals count the dropped results, if there are any.

=== Overall record ===
Result	Individual	Sprint	Pursuit	Mass start	Relay	Mixed relay	Single mixed relay	Total		
Result	Individual	Sprint	Pursuit	Mass start	Relay	Mixed relay	Single mixed relay	Individual events	Team events	All events
1st place	7	4	2	4	3	3	1	17	7	24
2nd place	0	6	10	2	4	9	1	18	14	32
3rd place	0	8	8	2	8	6	0	18	14	32
Podiums	7	18	20	8	15	18	2	53	35	88
Top 10	19	55	49	27	60	30	6	150	96	246
Points	35	113	94	59	70	30	6	301	106	407
Other	8	19	5	0	0	0	0	32	0	32
DNF	0	1	0	0	0	0	0	1	0	1
DSQ	0	0	0	0	0	0	0	0	0	0
**Starts**	**43**	**133**	**99**	**59**	**70**	**30**	**6**	334	106	440

* Results in IBU World Cup races, Olympics and World Championships.
** Updated as of 24 Feb 2025

==== Individual podiums ====
- 17 victories (7 Individuals, 4 Sprints, 2 Pursuits, 4 Mass starts)
- 53 podiums (7 Individuals, 18 Sprints, 20 Pursuits, 8 Mass starts)

No.	Season	Date	Location	Level	Race	Place
1	2013–14	8 March 2014	(Slovenia) Pokljuka	World Cup	Pursuit	3rd
2	2014–15	7 December 2014	(Sweden) Östersund	World Cup	Pursuit	3rd
3	2014–15	18 December 2014	(Slovenia) Pokljuka	World Cup	Sprint	2nd
4	2014–15	9 January 2015	(Germany) Oberhof	World Cup	Sprint	2nd
5	2015–16	3 December 2015	(Sweden) Östersund	World Cup	Individual	1st
6	2015–16	6 December 2015	(Sweden) Östersund	World Cup	Pursuit	2nd
7	2015–16	9 January 2016	(Germany) Ruhpolding	World Cup	Pursuit	3rd
8	2015–16	14 January 2016	(Germany) Ruhpolding	World Cup	Individual	1st
9	2015–16	21 January 2016	(Italy) Antholz-Anterselva	World Cup	Sprint	2nd
10	2015–16	23 January 2016	(Italy) Antholz-Anterselva	World Cup	Pursuit	3rd
11	2015–16	5 February 2016	(Canada) Canmore	World Cup	Sprint	3rd
12	2015–16	6 February 2016	(Canada) Canmore	World Cup	Mass start	1st
13	2015–16	**6 March 2016**	(Norway) **Oslo**	**World Championships**	**Pursuit**	**2nd**
14	2015–16	19 March 2016	(Russia) Khanty-Mansiysk	World Cup	Pursuit	3rd
15	2016–17	4 December 2016	(Sweden) Östersund	World Cup	Pursuit	3rd
16	2016–17	17 December 2016	(Czech Republic) Nové Město na Moravě	World Cup	Pursuit	2nd
17	2016–17	18 December 2016	(Czech Republic) Nové Město na Moravě	World Cup	Mass start	3rd
18	2017–18	8 December 2017	(Austria) Hochfilzen	World Cup	Sprint	3rd
19	2017–18	6 January 2018	(Germany) Oberhof	World Cup	Pursuit	2nd
20	2017–18	11 January 2018	(Germany) Ruhpolding	World Cup	Individual	1st
21	2017–18	20 January 2018	(Italy) Antholz-Anterselva	World Cup	Pursuit	2nd
22	2018–19	8 December 2018	(Slovenia) Pokljuka	World Cup	Sprint	2nd
23	2018–19	9 December 2018	(Slovenia) Pokljuka	World Cup	Pursuit	2nd
24	2018–19	13 December 2018	(Austria) Hochfilzen	World Cup	Sprint	1st
25	2018–19	15 December 2018	(Austria) Hochfilzen	World Cup	Pursuit	3rd
26	2018–19	22 December 2018	(Czech Republic) Nové Město na Moravě	World Cup	Pursuit	2nd
27	2018–19	26 January 2019	(Italy) Antholz-Anterselva	World Cup	Pursuit	1st
28	2018–19	**17 March 2019**	(Sweden) **Östersund**	**World Championships**	**Mass start**	**1st**
29	2019–20	1 December 2019	(Sweden) Östersund	World Cup	Sprint	1st
30	2019–20	13 December 2019	(Austria) Hochfilzen	World Cup	Sprint	1st
31	2019–20	22 December 2019	(France) Annecy-Le Grand-Bornand	World Cup	Mass start	2nd
32	2019–20	15 January 2020	(Germany) Ruhpolding	World Cup	Sprint	3rd
33	2019–20	**16 February 2020**	(Italy) **Antholz-Anterselva**	**World Championships**	**Pursuit**	**1st**
34	2019–20	**18 February 2020**	(Italy) **Antholz-Anterselva**	**World Championships**	**Individual**	**1st**
35	2019–20	**23 February 2020**	(Italy) **Antholz-Anterselva**	**World Championships**	**Mass start**	**2nd**
36	2020–21	28 November 2020	(Finland) Kontiolahti	World Cup	Individual	1st
37	2020–21	20 December 2020	(Austria) Hochfilzen	World Cup	Mass start	3rd
38	2020–21	14 January 2021	(Germany) Oberhof	World Cup	Sprint	2nd
39	2020–21	13 March 2021	(Czech Republic) Nové Město na Moravě	World Cup	Sprint	3rd
40	2020–21	19 March 2021	(Sweden) Östersund	World Cup	Sprint	2nd
41	2021–22	12 January 2022	(Germany) Ruhpolding	World Cup	Sprint	3rd
42	2021–22	23 January 2022	(Italy) Antholz-Anterselva	World Cup	Mass Start	1st
43	2021–22	**11 February 2022**	(China) Beijing	(International Olympic Committee) **Winter Olympic Games**	**Sprint**	**3rd**
44	2021–22	6 March 2022	(Finland) Kontiolahti	World Cup	Pursuit	2nd
45	2022–23	4 December 2022	(Finland) Kontiolahti	World Cup	Pursuit	2nd
46	2022–23	5 January 2023	(Slovenia) Pokljuka	World Cup	Sprint	3rd
47	2022–23	7 January 2023	(Slovenia) Pokljuka	World Cup	Pursuit	2nd
48	2022–23	19 January 2023	(Italy) Antholz-Anterselva	World Cup	Sprint	1st
49	2022–23	9 March 2023	(Sweden) Östersund	World Cup	Individual	1st
50	2022–23	12 March 2023	(Sweden) Östersund	World Cup	Mass Start	1st
51	2025–26	2 December 2025	(Sweden) Östersund	World Cup	Individual	1st
52	2025–26	18 December 2025	(France) Annecy-Le Grand-Bornand	World Cup	Sprint	3rd
53	2025–26	20 December 2025	(France) Annecy-Le Grand-Bornand	World Cup	Pursuit	3rd

*Results are from IBU races which include the Biathlon World Cup, Biathlon World Championships and the Winter Olympic Games.
*Bolded lines are WCH or WOG races

==== Relay podiums ====
- 7 victories (3 Women relays, 3 Mixed relays, 1 Single mixed relay)
- 35 podiums (15 Women relays, 18 Mixed relays, 2 Single mixed relays)

No.	Season	Date	Location	Level	Race	Place	Teammates
1	2012-13	**15 February 2013**	(Czech Republic) **Nové Město na Moravě**	**World Championships**	**Women 4x6 km**	**3rd**	**Gontier/Ponza/Oberhofer**
2	2013-14	**19 February 2014**	(Russia) **Sochi**	(International Olympic Committee) **Winter Olympic Games**	**Mixed 2x6+2x7.5 km (W-M)**	**3rd**	**Oberhofer/Windish/Hofer**
3	2014-15	15 February 2015	(Norway) Oslo	World Cup	Women 4x6 km	2nd	Gontier/Sanfilippo/Oberhofer
4	2014-15	**13 March 2015**	(Finland) **Kontiolahti**	**World Championships**	**Women 4x6 km**	**3rd**	**Vittozzi/Oberhofer/Gontier**
5	2015-16	13 December 2015	(Austria) Hochfilzen	World Cup	Women 4x6 km	1st	Vittozzi/Oberhofer/Sanfilippo
6	2015-16	17 January 2016	(Germany) Ruhpolding	World Cup	Women 4x6 km	3rd	Vittozzi/Oberhofer/Runggaldier
7	2015-16	7 February 2016	(Canada) Canmore	World Cup	Mixed 2x6+2x7.5 km (W-M)	2nd	Oberhofer/Hofer/Windisch
8	2016-17	27 November 2016	(Sweden) Östersund	World Cup	Mixed 2x6+2x7.5 km (W-M)	3rd	Vittozzi/Hofer/Windisch
9	2016-17	22 January 2017	(Italy) Antholz-Anterselva	World Cup	Women 4x6 km	3rd	Vittozzi/Sanfilippo/Runggaldier
10	2017-18	26 November 2017	(Sweden) Östersund	World Cup	Mixed 2x6+2x7.5 km (W-M)	2nd	Vittozzi/Windisch/Hofer
11	2017-18	13 January 2018	(Germany) Ruhpolding	World Cup	Women 4x6 km	2nd	Vittozzi/Gontier/Sanfilippo
12	2017-18	**20 February 2018**	(South Korea) **Pyeongchang**	(International Olympic Committee) **Winter Olympic Games**	**Mixed 2x6+2x7.5 km (W-M)**	**3rd**	**Vittozzi/Hofer/Windisch**
13	2017-18	10 March 2018	(Finland) Kontiolahti	World Cup	Mixed 2x6+2x7.5 km (W-M)	1st	Vittozzi/Windisch/Hofer
14	2017-18	17 March 2018	(Norway) Oslo	World Cup	Women 4x6 km	3rd	Vittozzi/Gontier/Sanfilippo
15	2018-19	2 December 2018	(Slovenia) Pokljuka	World Cup	Mixed 2x6+2x7.5 km (W-M)	3rd	Vittozzi/Hofer/Windisch
16	2018-19	16 December 2018	(Austria) Hochfilzen	World Cup	Women 4x6 km	1st	Vittozzi/Runggaldier/Sanfilippo
17	2018-19	17 February 2019	(United States) Soldier Hollow	World Cup	Single Mixed (M-W)	1st	Hofer
18	2018-19	**7 March 2019**	(Sweden) **Östersund**	**World Championships**	**Mixed 2x6+2x7.5 km (W-M)**	**3rd**	**Vittozzi/Hofer/Windisch**
19	2018-19	**14 March 2019**	(Sweden) **Östersund**	**World Championships**	**Single Mixed (W-M)**	**2nd**	**Hofer**
20	2019-20	30 November 2019	(Sweden) Östersund	World Cup	Mixed 4x6 km (W-M)	1st	Vittozzi/Hofer/Windisch
21	2019-20	**13 February 2020**	(Italy) **Antholz-Anterselva**	**World Championships**	**Mixed 4x6 km (W-M)**	**2nd**	**Vittozzi/Hofer/Windisch**
22	2020-21	14 March 2021	(Czech Republic) Nové Město na Moravě	World Cup	Mixed 4x6 km (W-M)	2nd	Vittozzi/Windisch/Hofer
23	2021-22	3 March 2022	(Finland) Kontiolahti	World Cup	Women 4x6 km	3rd	Comola/Sanfilippo/Vittozzi
24	2022-23	11 December 2022	(Austria) Hochfilzen	World Cup	Women 4x6 km	3rd	Passler/Comola/Vittozzi
25	2022-23	8 January 2023	(Slovenia) Pokljuka	World Cup	Mixed 4x7.5 km (M-W)	2nd	Bionaz/Giacomel/Vittozzi
26	2022-23	14 January 2023	(Germany) Ruhpolding	World Cup	Women 4x6 km	3rd	Comola/Vittozzi/Passler
27	2022-23	**9 February 2023**	(Germany) **Oberhof**	**World Championships**	**Mixed 4x6 km (W-M)**	**2nd**	**Vittozzi/Bionaz/Giacomel**
28	2022-23	**18 February 2023**	(Germany) **Oberhof**	**World Championships**	**Women 4x6 km**	**1st**	**Comola/Auchentaller/Vittozzi**
29	2023-24	25 November 2023	(Sweden) Östersund	World Cup	Mixed 4x6 km (M-W)	3rd	Bionaz/Giacomel/Vittozzi
30	2023-24	20 January 2024	(Italy) Antholz-Anterselva	World Cup	Mixed 4x6 km (W-M)	2nd	Vittozzi/Bionaz/Giacomel
31	2025-26	29 November 2025	(Sweden) Östersund	World Cup	Women 4x6 km	2nd	Carrara/Vittozzi/Auchentaller
32	2025-26	30 November 2025	(Sweden) Östersund	World Cup	Mixed 4x6 km (M-W)	2nd	Giacomel/Hofer/Vittozzi
33	2025-26	14 January 2026	(Germany) Ruhpolding	World Cup	Women 4x6 km	2nd	Auchentaller/Carrara/Vittozzi
34	2025-26	24 January 2026	(Czech Republic) Nové Město na Moravě	World Cup	Mixed 4x6 km (W-M)	1st	Vittozzi/Hofer/Giacomel
35	2025-26	**8 February 2026**	(Italy) **Milano Cortina - Antholz/Anterselva**	(International Olympic Committee) **Winter Olympic Games**	**Mixed 4x6 (M-W)**	**2nd**	Giacomel/Hofer/Vittozzi

*Results are from IBU races which include the Biathlon World Cup, Biathlon World Championships and the Winter Olympic Games.
*Bolded lines are WCH or OWG races

== See also ==
- Italian sportswomen multiple medalists at Olympics and World Championships

== Notes ==
Notes about WC results

During Wierer's career, until 2023 the World Championships results counted for the World Cup of that season, starting from that season they did not anymore. Olympic Winter Games results did not.
