= Östersund Ski Stadium =

Ski facility in Östersund, Sweden

Coordinates: 63.1903°N 14.6581°E

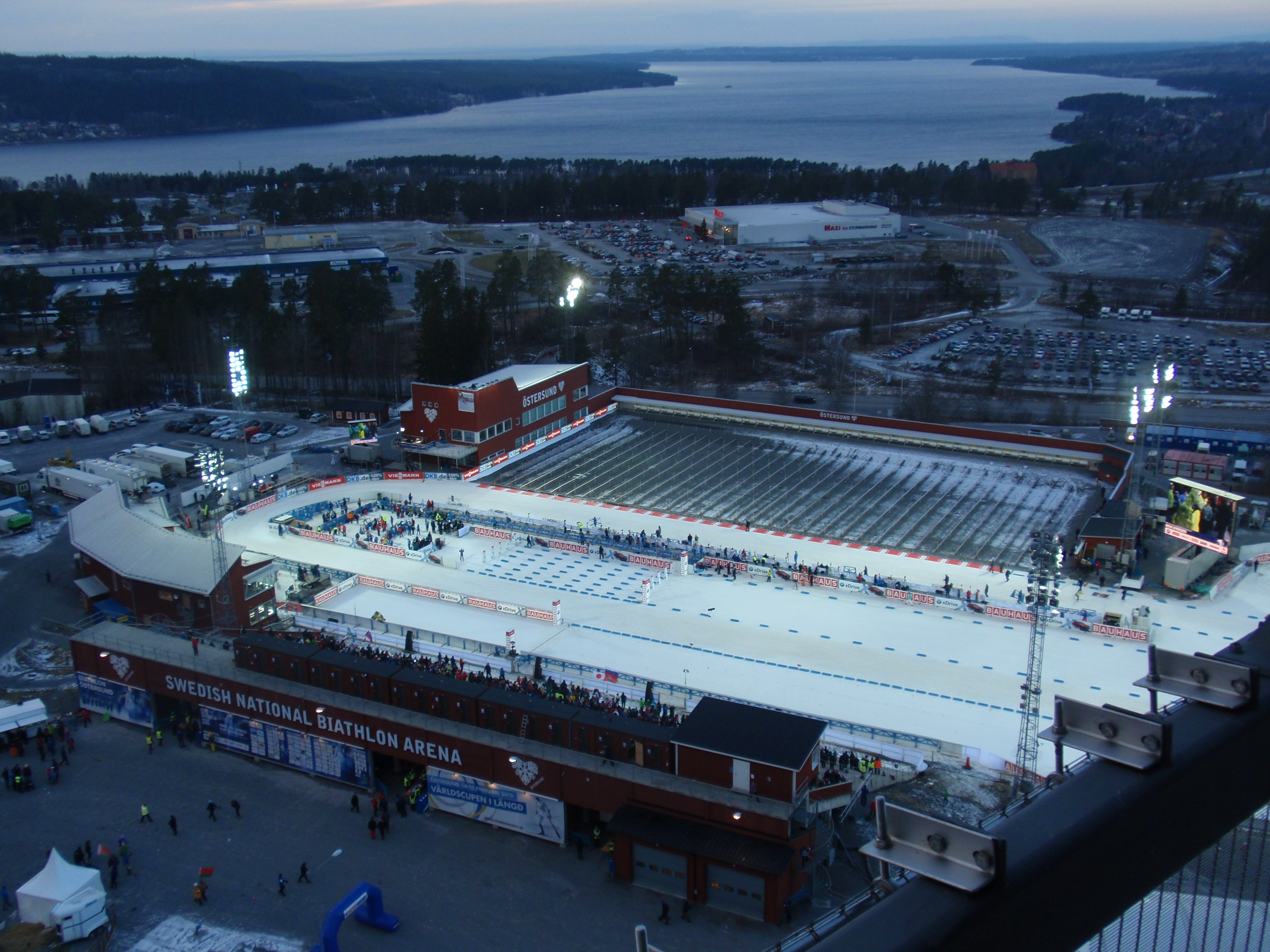
- Östersund Ski Stadium in December 2014
- Interactive map of Östersund Ski Stadium
- Location: Östersund, Sweden
- Type: stadium

The Östersund Ski Stadium (Swedish: Östersunds skidstadion) is a cross-country skiing, biathlon, and ski orienteering facility in Östersund, Sweden. In October 2013, it was appointed national stadium for Swedish biathlon. Since 2007, the stadium has always had snow since 1 November, using leftover snow gathered by Östersund Municipality over the spring and summertime season.

== Major events ==
- Biathlon World Championships 1970
- Biathlon World Championships 2008
- Biathlon World Championships 2019
- Biathlon World Cup round (recurring)
- World Ski Orienteering Championships 2004
