= Emma Nilsson =

Swedish biathlete (born 1993)

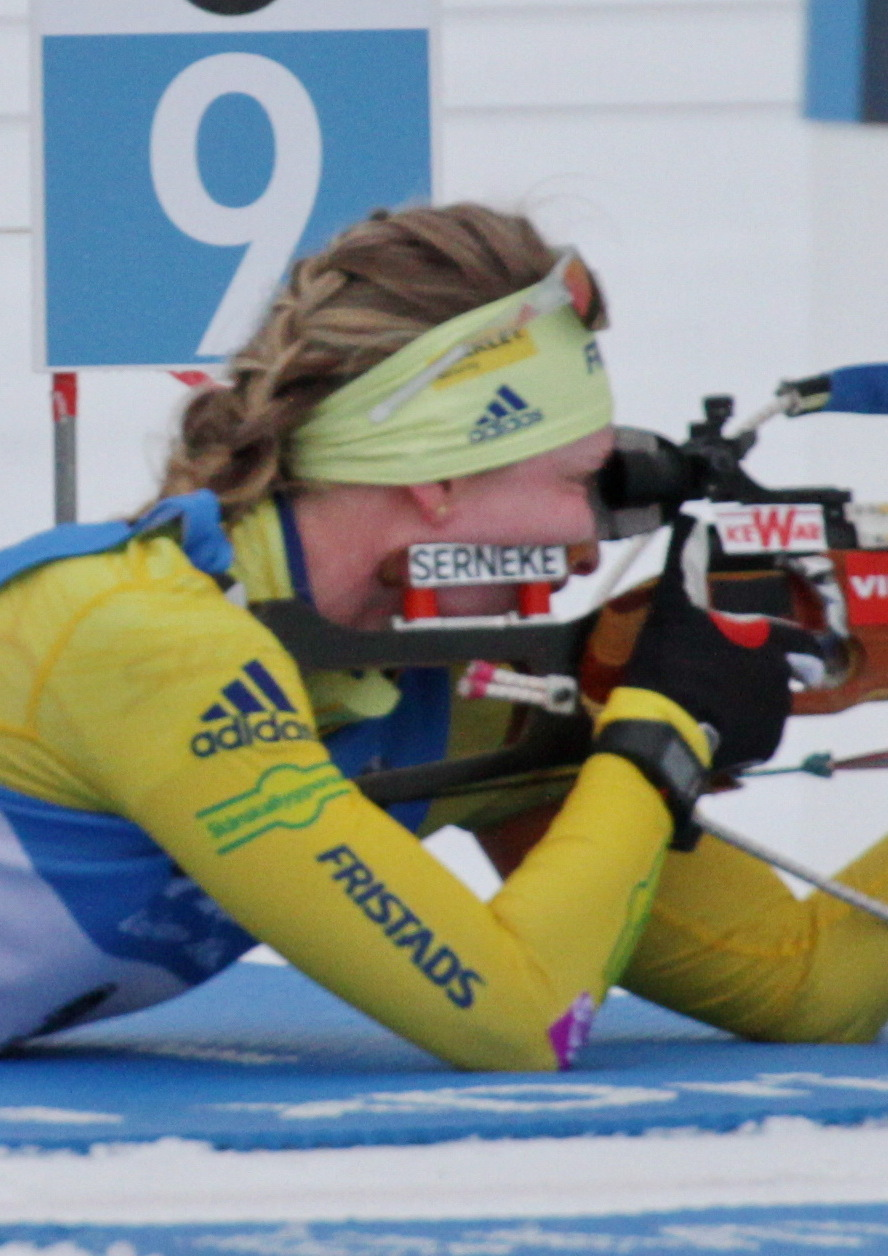
- Emma Nilsson during IBU Biathlon World Cup competitions in Oberhof, Germany, 2018

Personal information
- Nationality: Swedish
- Born: 18 November 1993 (age 32)

Sport
- Country: Sweden
- Sport: Biathlon
Medal record
European Championships
Gold medal – first place	2019 Raubichi	Mixed Relay

Emma Nilsson (born 18 November 1993) is a Swedish biathlete. She competed in the 2014/15 World Cup season, and also represented Sweden at the Biathlon World Championships 2015 in Kontiolahti.

== Biathlon results ==
All results are sourced from the International Biathlon Union.

=== World Championships ===
0 medals

Event	Individual	Sprint	Pursuit	Mass start	Relay	Mixed relay	Single mixed relay
(Finland) 2015 Kontiolahti	71st	83rd	—	—	8th	—	—
(Norway) 2016 Oslo	56th	—	—	—	—	—	—
(Austria) 2017 Hochfilzen	67th	—	—	—	6th	—	—
(Sweden) 2019 Östersund	22nd	—	—	—	—	—	—

*During Olympic seasons competitions are only held for those events not included in the Olympic program.
**The single mixed relay was added as an event in 2019.
