= Megan Bankes =

Canadian biathlete

Personal information
- Born: 22 August 1997 (age 29) Calgary, Alberta, Canada

Sport
- Sport: Biathlon
Medal record
Women's biathlon
Representing Canada
Junior World Championships
Gold medal – first place	2017 Osrblie	12.5 km individual

Megan Bankes (born 22 August 1997) is a Canadian biathlete.

In January 2022, Bankes was named to Canada's 2022 Olympic team.

== Career results ==
=== Olympic Games ===
0 medals

Event	Individual	Sprint	Pursuit	Mass start	Relay	Mixed relay
(China) 2022 Beijing	33rd	77th	—	—	10th	—

=== World Championships ===
0 medals

Event	Individual	Sprint	Pursuit	Mass start	Relay	Mixed relay	Single mixed relay
(Sweden) 2019 Östersund	75th	58th	LAP	—	14th	—	—
(Italy) 2020 Antholz	87th	61st	—	—	9th	—	—
(Slovenia) 2021 Pokljuka	88th	35th	46th	—	16th	—	—

== Personal life ==
Bankes came out as lesbian.
