= Christina Rieder =

Austrian biathlete (born 1993)

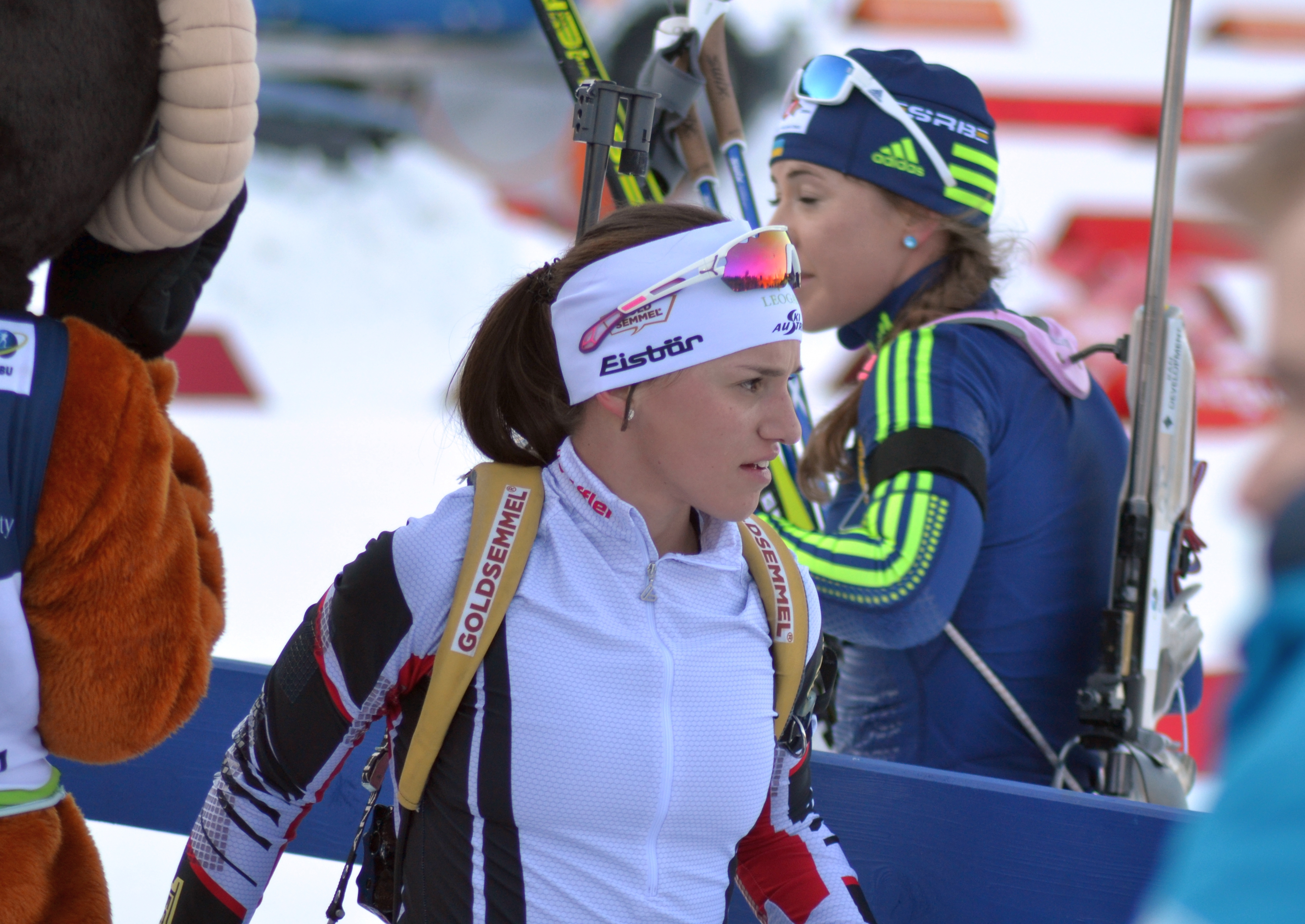
- Rieder in 2017

Personal information
- Nationality: Austrian
- Born: 29 December 1993 (age 32) Zell am See, Austria

Sport
- Country: Austria
- Sport: Biathlon
Medal record
Youth World Championships
Bronze medal – third place	2012 Kontiolahti	3 × 6 km relay
European Championships
Silver medal – second place	2015 Otepää	15 km individual

Christina Rieder (born 29 December 1993) is an Austrian biathlete. She was born in Zell am See. She has competed in the Biathlon World Cup, and represented Austria at the Biathlon World Championships 2016.

== Biathlon results ==
All results are sourced from the International Biathlon Union.

=== World Championships ===
0 medals

Event	Individual	Sprint	Pursuit	Mass start	Relay	Mixed relay	Single mixed relay
(Norway) 2016 Oslo	—	86th	—	—	—	—	—
(Austria) 2017 Hochfilzen	60th	—	—	—	DSQ	—	—
(Sweden) 2019 Östersund	35th	—	—	—	16th	17th	—
(Italy) 2020 Rasen-Antholz	7th	51st	31st	—	12th	—	—

*During Olympic seasons competitions are only held for those events not included in the Olympic program.
**The single mixed relay was added as an event in 2019.
