= Joanne Reid =

American biathlete (born 1992)

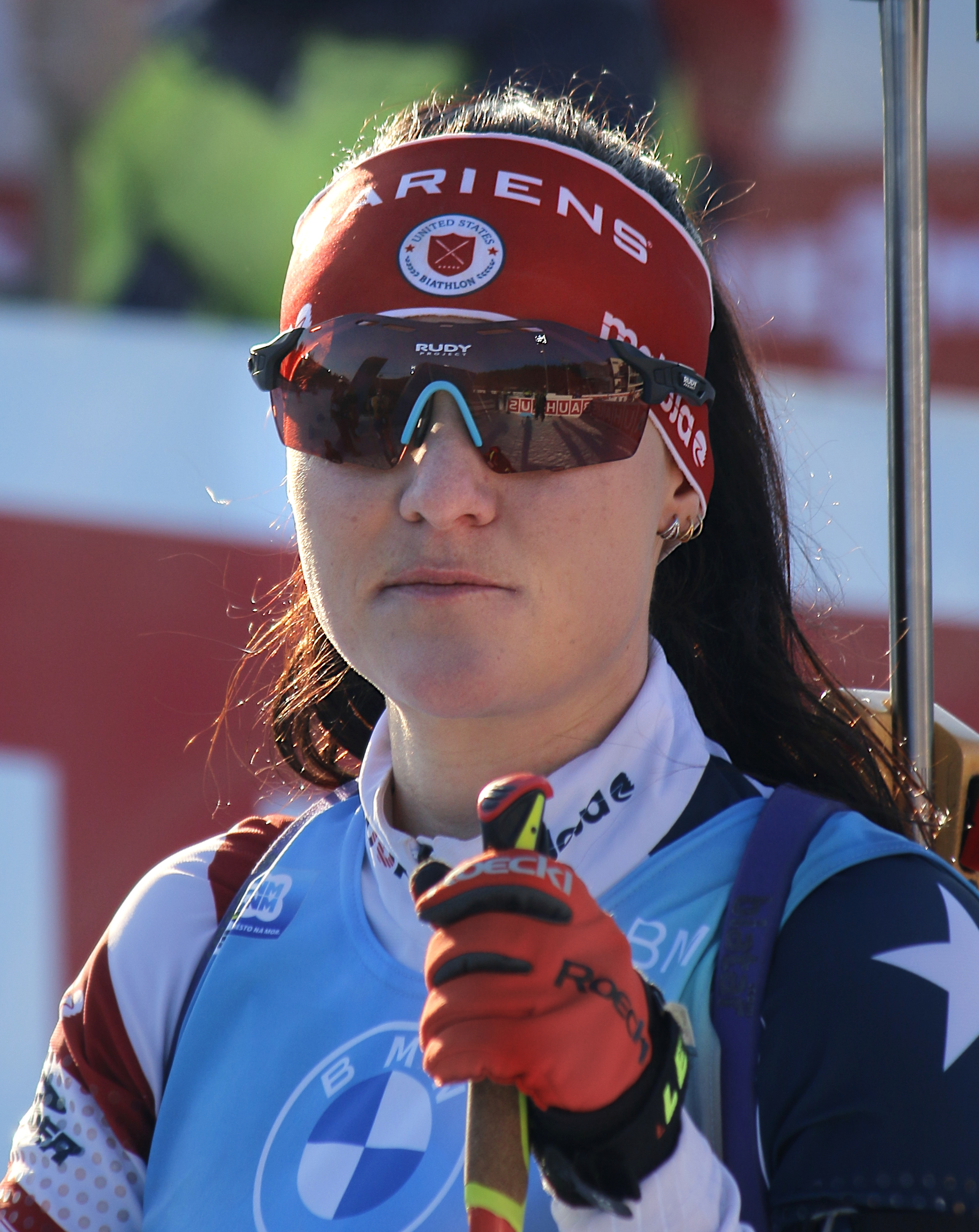
- Joanne Reid (2023)

Personal information
- Born: June 28, 1992 (age 34) Madison, Wisconsin, U.S.

Sport

Professional information
- Sport: Biathlon
- Club: Colorado Biathlon Club
- World Cup debut: 2016

Olympic Games
- Teams: 3
- Medals: 0

World Championships
- Teams: 5 (2017, 2019)
- Medals: 0

World Cup
- Seasons: 2 (2015/16–)
- Individual victories: 0
- All victories: 0
- Individual podiums: 0
- All podiums: 0

Joanne Firesteel Reid (born June 28, 1992) is an American biathlete. She competed at the 2018 Winter Olympics, 2022 Winter Olympics, and 2026 Winter Olympics in women's mass start, women's relay, women's pursuit, women's individual, and women's sprint events.

== Life ==
Joanne Reid is the daughter of Olympian Beth Heiden and niece of Eric Heiden. She grew up in Palo Alto and skied cross country at University of Colorado.

She competed in the Biathlon World Championships 2017, and Biathlon World Championships 2021.

== Biathlon results ==
All results are sourced from the International Biathlon Union.

=== Olympic Games ===
0 medals

Event	Individual	Sprint	Pursuit	Mass Start	Relay	Mixed Relay
(South Korea) 2018 Pyeongchang	22nd	86th	—	—	13th	15th
(China) 2022 Beijing	57th	34th	29th	—	11th	—
(Italy) 2026 Milano Cortina	68th	72nd	—	—	18th	—

=== World Championships ===
0 medals

Event	Individual	Sprint	Pursuit	Mass start	Relay	Mixed relay	Single mixed relay
(Austria) 2017 Hochfilzen	56th	49th	38th	—	14th	—	—N/a
(Sweden) 2019 Östersund	32nd	15th	32nd	10th	9th	—	—
(Italy) 2020 Antholz	79th	62nd	—	—	15th	—	—
(Slovenia) 2021 Pokljuka	40th	55th	55th	—	13th	12th	—
(Czech Republic) 2023 Nové Město na Moravě	—	73rd	—	—	—	—	16th

*During Olympic seasons competitions are only held for those events not included in the Olympic program.

=== World Cup ===
Season	Overall		Individual		Sprint		Pursuit		Mass start	
Season	Points	Position	Points	Position	Points	Position	Points	Position	Points	Position
2016–17	21	84th	12	56th	6	80th	3	82nd	0	—
