= Ekaterina Yurlova-Percht =

Russian biathlete

Ekaterina Yurlova
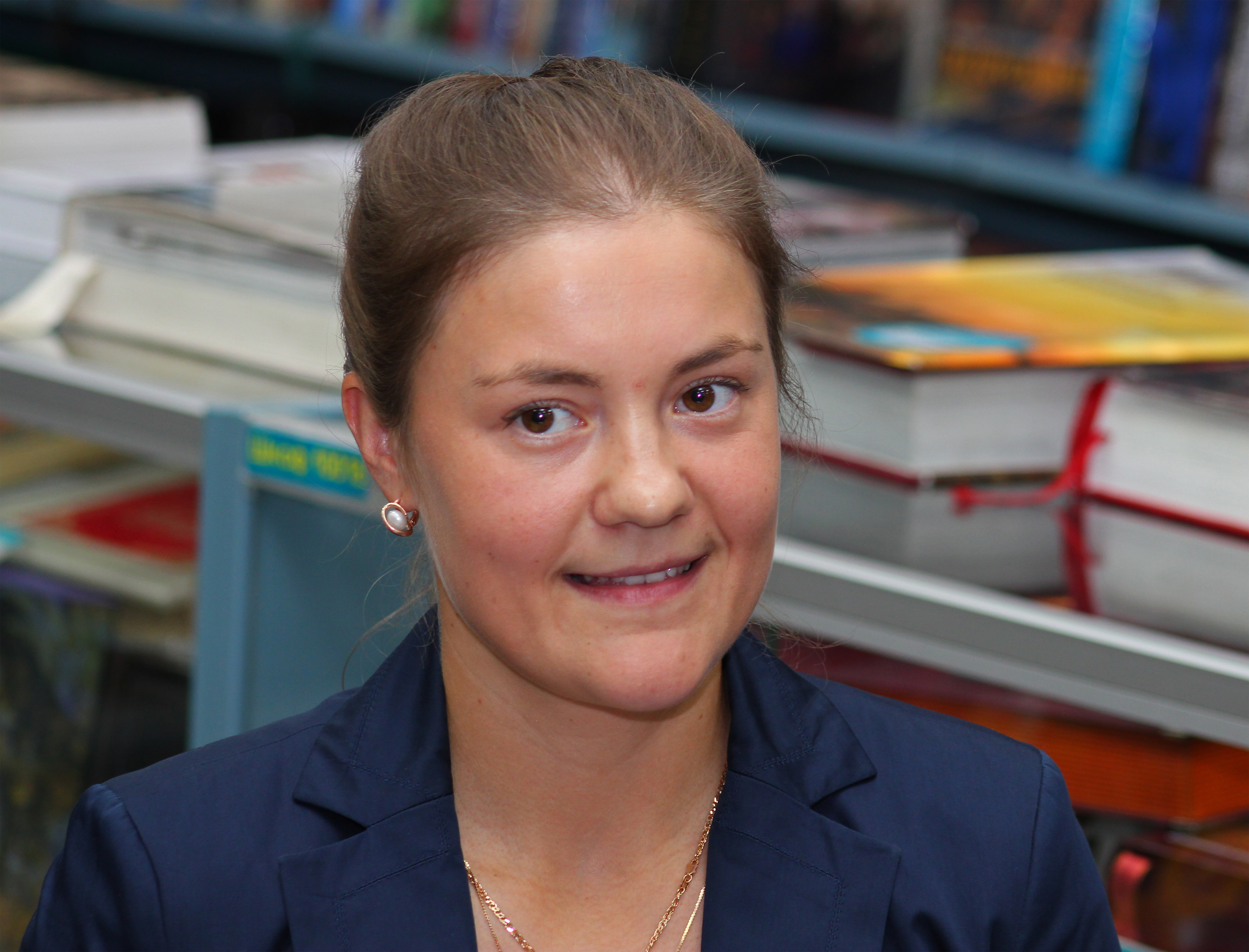
- Yurlova in 2011

Personal information
- Full name: Ekaterina Viktorovna Yurlova-Percht
- Nationality: Russian
- Born: 23 February 1985 (age 41) Leningrad, RSFSR, Soviet Union
- Height: 1.60 m (5 ft 3 in)
- Weight: 58 kg (128 lb)

Sport

Professional information
- Sport: Biathlon
- World Cup debut: 6 March 2008

World Championships
- Teams: 5 (2011, 2013–2016, 2019)
- Medals: 2 (1 gold)

World Cup
- Seasons: 10 (2007/08, 2009/10–2015/16, 2017/18– )
- Individual victories: 2
- All victories: 3
- Individual podiums: 5
- All podiums: 7
Medal record
Women's biathlon
Representing Russia
World Championships
Gold medal – first place	2015 Kontiolahti	15 km individual
Silver medal – second place	2019 Östersund	12.5 km mass start
European Championships
Gold medal – first place	2019 Raubichi	10 km pursuit
Silver medal – second place	2009 Ufa	4 × 6 km relay
Silver medal – second place	2019 Raubichi	7.5 km sprint
Bronze medal – third place	2015 Otepää	15 km individual
Bronze medal – third place	2015 Otepää	10 km pursuit
Bronze medal – third place	2010 Otepää	4 × 6 km relay

Ekaterina Viktorovna Yurlova-Percht (Russian: Екатери́на Ви́кторовна Ю́рлова-Перхт; born 23 February 1985) is a former Russian biathlete.

She debuted at the World Cup in 2008. In 2015, she won World Championships at 15 km individual distance, which was her first victory at the World Cup.

On 17 October 2015, Yurlova married Josef Percht, masseur of the Austrian biathlon team. Since then she is known as Yurlova-Percht. On 13 November 2016, she gave birth to Kira.

== Biathlon results ==
All results are sourced from the International Biathlon Union.

=== World Championships ===
2 medals (1 gold, 1 silver)

Event	Individual	Sprint	Pursuit	Mass start	Relay	Mixed relay	Single mixed relay
(Russia) 2011 Khanty-Mansiysk	7th	6th	10th	14th	8th	—	—N/a
(Czech Republic) 2013 Nové Město	32nd	—	—	—	—	—	—N/a
(Finland) 2015 Kontiolahti	Gold	—	—	11th	DSQ	—	—N/a
(Norway) 2016 Oslo Holmenkollen	11th	19th	21st	13th	11th	7th	—N/a
(Sweden) 2019 Östersund	17th	8th	19th	Silver	5th	4th	—
(Italy) 2020 Antholz-Anterselva	13th	21st	12th	6th	8th	6th	–

*During Olympic seasons competitions are only held for those events not included in the Olympic program.
**The single mixed relay was added as an event in 2019.

=== World Cup ===
Season	Age	Overall		Individual		Sprint		Pursuit		Mass start	
Season	Age	Points	Position	Points	Position	Points	Position	Points	Position	Points	Position
2009–10	26	67	58th	10	64th	42	51st	15	54th	—	—
2010–11	27	544	16th	79	17th	208	16th	160	12th	97	20th
2011–12	28	188	36th	31	31st	58	46th	40	44th	59	26th
2012–13	29	266	32nd	71	15th	62	42nd	80	32nd	53	28th
2013–14	30	9	92nd	—	—	9	82nd	—	—	—	—
2014–15	31	237	31st	82	7th	38	57th	53	39th	64	24th
2015–16	32	440	20th	52	18th	151	21st	187	11th	50	28th
2017–18	33	474	13th	8	49th	185	11th	158	10th	123	13th
2018–19	34	494	14th	24	43rd	174	13th	141	21st	155	5th
2019–20	35	363	17th	59	16th	92	32nd	92	18th	120	15th

=== Individual victories ===
2 victories (1 In, 1 Pu)

Season	Date	Location	Discipline	Level
2014–15	11 March 2015	(Finland) Kontiolahti	15 km individual	World Championships
2015–16	23 January 2016	(Italy) Antholz	10 km pursuit	World Cup

*Results are from UIPMB and IBU races which include the Biathlon World Cup, Biathlon World Championships and the Winter Olympic Games.
