= Biathlon World Championships 2019 =

2019 edition of the Biathlon World Championships

- Host city: Östersund
- Country: Sweden
- Events: 12
- Opening: 6 March
- Closing: 17 March
- Opened by: Carl XVI Gustaf of Sweden
- Main venue: Östersund Ski Stadium

The Biathlon World Championships 2019 took place in Östersund, Sweden, from 6 to 17 March 2019.

There were a total of 12 competitions: sprint, pursuit, individual, mass start, and relay races for men and women, and two mixed relay races. The single mixed relay was on the program of the World Championships for the first time. All the events during this championships also counted for the 2018–19 Biathlon World Cup season.

== Host selection ==
On 7 September 2014, Östersund won the voting (27 votes) in St. Wolfgang, Austria over Antholz, Italy (16 votes), Nové Město na Moravě, Czech Republic (4 votes) and Khanty-Mansiysk, Russia (2 votes). This was third time when World Championships was held in Östersund; the town had previously hosted the event in 1970 and 2008.

== Schedule ==
All times are local (UTC+1).

Date	Time	Event
7 March	16:15	W 2 × 6 km + M 2 × 7.5 km mixed relay
8 March	16:15	Women's 7.5 km sprint
9 March	16:30	Men's 10 km sprint
10 March	13:45	Women's 10 km pursuit
10 March	16:10	Men's 12.5 km pursuit
12 March	15:30	Women's 15 km individual
13 March	16:10	Men's 20 km individual
14 March	17:10	W 6 km + M 7.5 km single mixed relay
16 March	13:15	Women's 4 × 6 km relay
16 March	16:30	Men's 4 × 7.5 km relay
17 March	13:15	Women's 12.5 km mass start
17 March	16:00	Men's 15 km mass start

== Medal summary ==
=== Medal table ===
* Host nation (Sweden)

Rank	Nation	Gold	Silver	Bronze	Total
1	Norway (NOR)	5	3	1	9
2	Germany (GER)	2	2	3	7
3	Italy (ITA)	2	2	1	5
4	Sweden (SWE)*	1	1	1	3
5	Ukraine (UKR)	1	0	1	2
6	Slovakia (SVK)	1	0	0	1
7	Russia (RUS)	0	2	1	3
8	France (FRA)	0	1	3	4
9	Bulgaria (BUL)	0	1	0	1
10	Austria (AUT)	0	0	1	1
Totals (10 entries)		12	12	12	36

=== Top athletes ===
All athletes with two or more medals.

Rank	Nation	Gold	Silver	Bronze	Total
1	Johannes Thingnes Bø (NOR)	4	1	0	5
2	Marte Olsbu Røiseland (NOR)	3	0	0	3
3	Tiril Eckhoff (NOR)	2	1	0	3
4	Vetle Sjåstad Christiansen (NOR)	2	0	0	2
5	Arnd Peiffer (GER)	1	2	0	3
6	Denise Herrmann (GER)	1	1	1	3
6	Dorothea Wierer (ITA)	1	1	1	3
6	Hanna Öberg (SWE)	1	1	1	3
9	Ingrid Landmark Tandrevold (NOR)	1	1	0	2
10	Dominik Windisch (ITA)	1	0	1	2
10	Tarjei Bø (NOR)	1	0	1	2
12	Benedikt Doll (GER)	0	2	0	2
13	Alexander Loginov (RUS)	0	1	1	2
13	Lisa Vittozzi (ITA)	0	1	1	2
13	Lukas Hofer (ITA)	0	1	1	2
16	Laura Dahlmeier (GER)	0	0	2	2
16	Quentin Fillon Maillet (FRA)	0	0	2	2

=== Men ===
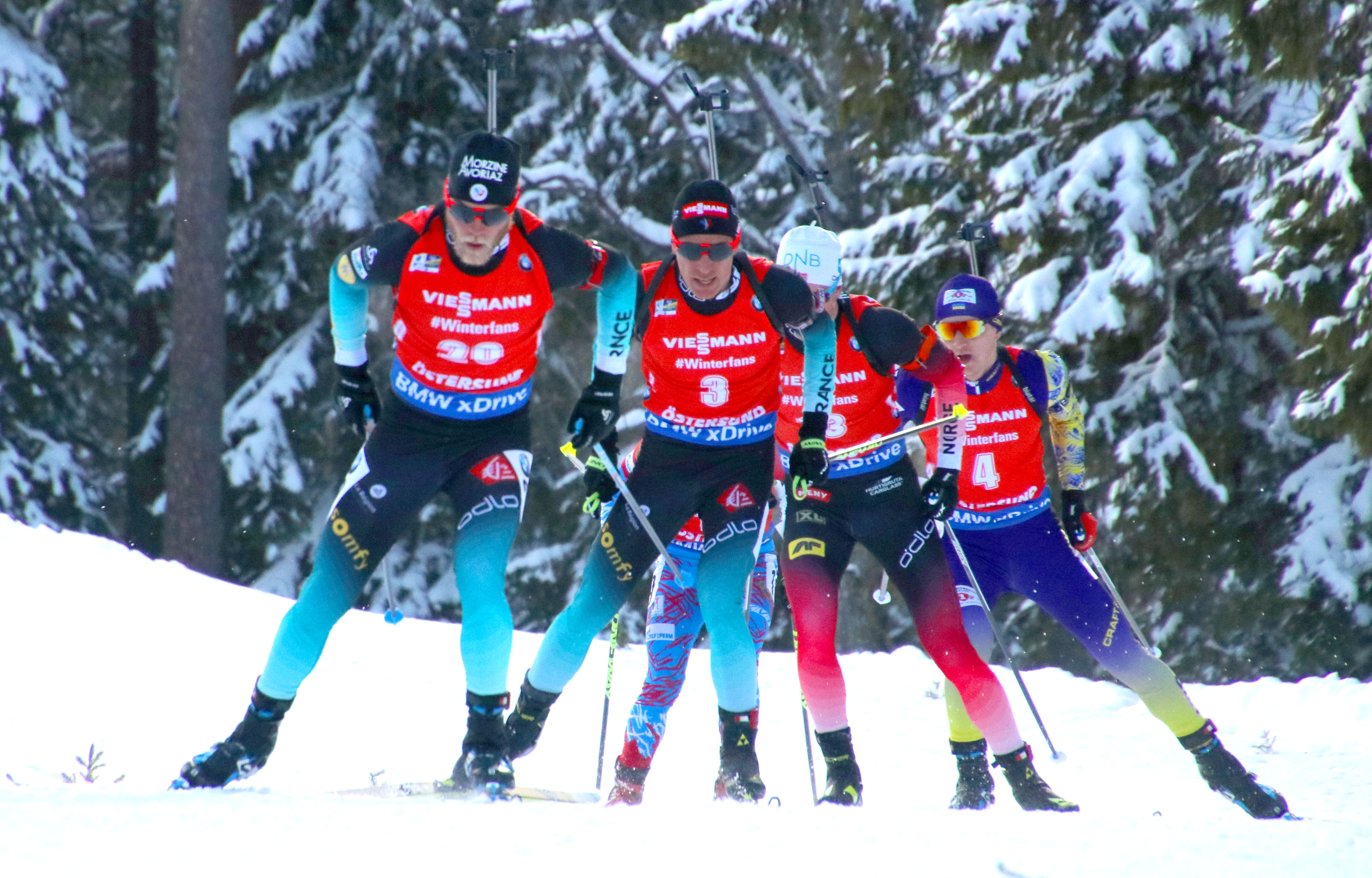
Antonin Guigonnat, Quentin Fillon-Maillet, and Dmytro Pidruchnyi during the pursuit.

Event	Gold		Silver		Bronze	
10 km sprint	Johannes Thingnes Bø; Norway	24:37.6 (0+1)	Alexander Loginov; Russia	24:51.3 (0+0)	Quentin Fillon Maillet; France	24:54.1 (0+0)
12.5 km pursuit	Dmytro Pidruchnyi; Ukraine	31:54.1 (2+0+0+0)	Johannes Thingnes Bø; Norway	32:02.4 (0+1+1+3)	Quentin Fillon Maillet; France	32:11.8 (2+0+0+1)
20 km individual	Arnd Peiffer; Germany	52:42.4 (0+0+0+0)	Vladimir Iliev; Bulgaria	53:51.1 (0+1+0+0)	Tarjei Bø; Norway	53:51.5 (0+1+0+0)
4 × 7.5 km relay	Norway Lars Helge Birkeland; Vetle Sjåstad Christiansen; Tarjei Bø; Johannes Thingnes Bø	1:12:03.7 (0+1) (0+0) (0+0) (0+0) (0+0) (0+2) (0+0) (0+3)	Germany Erik Lesser; Roman Rees; Arnd Peiffer; Benedikt Doll	1:12:41.8 (0+1) (0+1) (0+1) (0+2) (0+0) (0+1) (0+1) (0+1)	Russia Matvey Eliseev; Nikita Porshnev; Dmitry Malyshko; Alexander Loginov	1:13:07.8 (0+0) (0+2) (0+1) (0+1) (0+2) (0+1) (0+0) (0+0)
15 km mass start	Dominik Windisch; Italy	40:54.1 (1+1+1+0)	Antonin Guigonnat; France	41:16.9 (2+0+0+1)	Julian Eberhard; Austria	41:17.4 (0+0+3+1)

=== Women ===
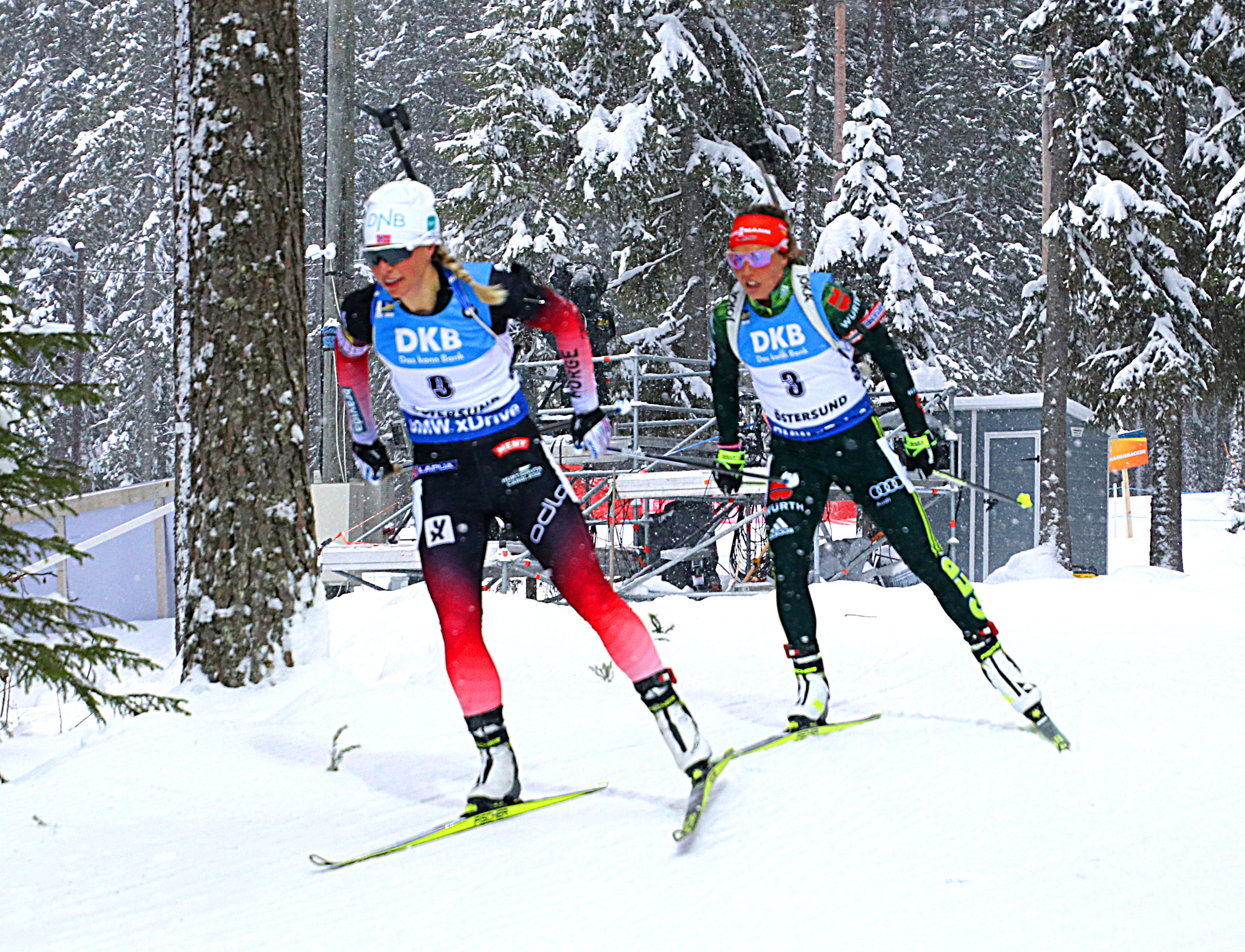
Tiril Eckhoff and Laura Dahlmeier during the pursuit.

Event	Gold		Silver		Bronze	
7.5 km sprint	Anastasiya Kuzmina; Slovakia	22:17.5 (1+0)	Ingrid Landmark Tandrevold; Norway	22:27.2 (0+0)	Laura Dahlmeier; Germany	22:30.1 (0+0)
10 km pursuit	Denise Herrmann; Germany	31:45.9 (0+0+2+0)	Tiril Eckhoff; Norway	32:17.3 (0+0+2+0)	Laura Dahlmeier; Germany	32:17.5 (0+0+1+0)
15 km individual	Hanna Öberg; Sweden	43:10.4 (0+0+0+0)	Lisa Vittozzi; Italy	43:34.0 (0+0+0+0)	Justine Braisaz; France	43:42.9 (0+0+1+0)
4 × 6 km relay	Norway Synnøve Solemdal; Ingrid Landmark Tandrevold; Tiril Eckhoff; Marte Olsbu Røiseland	1:12:00.1 (0+2) (0+0) (0+0) (0+0) (0+2) (1+3) (0+1) (0+0)	Sweden Linn Persson; Mona Brorsson; Anna Magnusson; Hanna Öberg	1:12:24.4 (0+0) (0+0) (0+0) (0+1) (0+0) (0+0) (0+2) (0+3)	Ukraine Anastasiya Merkushyna; Vita Semerenko; Yuliia Dzhima; Valentyna Semerenko	1:12:35.2 (0+0) (0+0) (0+1) (0+0) (0+0) (0+2) (0+1) (0+1)
12.5 km mass start	Dorothea Wierer; Italy	37:26.4 (0+0+0+2)	Ekaterina Yurlova-Percht; Russia	37:31.3 (0+0+1+1)	Denise Herrmann; Germany	37:41.8 (0+1+2+1)

=== Mixed ===
Event	Gold		Silver		Bronze	
2 × 6 km W + 2 × 7.5 km M relay	Norway Marte Olsbu Røiseland; Tiril Eckhoff; Johannes Thingnes Bø; Vetle Sjåstad Christiansen	1:17:41.4 (0+1) (0+1) (0+2) (0+1) (0+0) (0+2) (0+0) (0+0)	Germany Vanessa Hinz; Denise Herrmann; Arnd Peiffer; Benedikt Doll	1:17:54.5 (0+0) (0+2) (0+0) (0+3) (0+1) (0+1) (0+0) (0+2)	Italy Lisa Vittozzi; Dorothea Wierer; Lukas Hofer; Dominik Windisch	1:18:51.0 (0+0) (0+0) (0+2) (0+2) (0+2) (0+3) (0+2) (0+3)
6 km W + 7.5 km M single relay	Norway Marte Olsbu Røiseland; Johannes Thingnes Bø	35:43.2 (0+1) (0+1) (0+0) (0+3) (0+1) (0+0) (0+0) (0+0)	Italy Dorothea Wierer; Lukas Hofer	35:56.6 (0+1) (0+0) (0+0) (0+2) (0+0) (0+1) (0+0) (0+1)	Sweden Hanna Öberg; Sebastian Samuelsson	36:03.2 (0+2) (0+0) (0+1) (0+2) (0+1) (0+0) (0+1) (0+1)
