= 2019–20 Biathlon IBU Cup =

Discipline	Men	Women
Overall	(Germany) Lucas Fratzscher	(Sweden) Elisabeth Högberg
Nations Cup	Norway	Russia
Individual	(Norway) Endre Strømsheim	(Germany) Stefanie Scherer
Sprint	(Germany) Lucas Fratzscher	(Sweden) Elisabeth Högberg
Super sprint	(Norway) Lars Helge Birkeland	(Sweden) Ingela Andersson
Pursuit	(Norway) Endre Strømsheim	(Sweden) Elisabeth Högberg
Mass start	(Norway) Lars Helge Birkeland	(Russia) Anastasiia Porshneva
- Mixed: Norway

Competition
Locations	6 venues	6 venues
Individual	23 events	23 events
Mixed	5 events	5 events
Cancelled	1 events	1 events

The 2019–20 Biathlon IBU Cup was a multi-race tournament over a season of biathlon, organised by the International Biathlon Union. IBU Cup is the second-rank competition in biathlon after the Biathlon World Cup. The season started on 25 November 2019 in Sjusjøen, Norway and ended on 8 March 2020 in Minsk-Raubichi, Belarus. The defending overall champions from the 2018–19 Biathlon IBU Cup were Anton Babikov and Victoria Slivko from Russia.

== Calendar ==
Below is the IBU Cup calendar for the 2019–20 season.

Location	Date	Individual	Sprint	Pursuit	Mixed relay	Single mixed relay	Super sprint	Mass start 60	Details
(Norway) Sjusjøen	25 November – 1 December		● ●	●					details
(Italy) Ridnaun-Val Ridanna	9 – 15 December		●				●	●	details
(Austria) Obertilliach	16 – 21 December	●	●		●	●			details
(Slovakia) Brezno-Osrblie	6 – 12 January	●	●						details
(Slovakia) Brezno-Osrblie	13 – 18 January		●	●	●	●			details
(Italy) Martell-Val Martello	3 – 9 February		●					●	details
(Italy) Martell-Val Martello	10 – 15 February		●	●			●		details
(Belarus) Minsk-Raubichi	24 February – 1 March		●	●	●	●	●		European Championships
(Belarus) Minsk-Raubichi	2 – 8 March		● ●					●	details
Total: 52 (23 men's, 23 women's, 6 mixed)		2	11	4	3	3	3	3	

Notes

- All European Championships races included in the IBU Cup total score.

== IBU Cup podiums ==
=== Men ===
Stage	Date	Place	Discipline	Winner	Second	Third	Yellow bib (After competition)	Res.
1	28 November 2019	(Norway) Sjusjøen	10 km Sprint	(Germany) Lucas Fratzscher	(Austria) Harald Lemmerer	(Norway) Aleksander Fjeld Andersen	(Germany) Lucas Fratzscher	
1	30 November 2019	(Norway) Sjusjøen	10 km Sprint	(Norway) Fredrik Gjesbakk	(Norway) Sindre Pettersen	(Germany) Lucas Fratzscher	(Germany) Lucas Fratzscher	
1	1 December 2019	(Norway) Sjusjøen	12.5 km Pursuit	(Germany) Philipp Nawrath	(Norway) Fredrik Gjesbakk	(Germany) Lucas Fratzscher	(Norway) Fredrik Gjesbakk	
2	12 December 2019	(Italy) Ridnaun-Val Ridanna	Super Sprint	(Norway) Lars Helge Birkeland	(Italy) Rudy Zini	(France) Martin Perrillat Bottonet	(Norway) Fredrik Gjesbakk	
2	14 December 2019	(Italy) Ridnaun-Val Ridanna	10 km Sprint	(Belarus) Maksim Varabei	(Norway) Fredrik Gjesbakk	(Russia) Alexander Povarnitsyn	(Norway) Fredrik Gjesbakk	
2	15 December 2019	(Italy) Ridnaun-Val Ridanna	Mass Start 60	(Norway) Lars Helge Birkeland	(Germany) Roman Rees	(Norway) Haavard Bogetveit	(Norway) Fredrik Gjesbakk	
3	18 December 2019	(Austria) Obertilliach	15 km Short Individual	(Ukraine) Serhiy Semenov	(Germany) Lucas Fratzscher	(Norway) Lars Helge Birkeland	(Germany) Lucas Fratzscher	
3	20 December 2019	(Austria) Obertilliach	10 km Sprint	(Norway) Aleksander Fjeld Andersen	(United States) Paul Schommer	(Germany) Philipp Nawrath	(Germany) Lucas Fratzscher	
4	10 January 2020	(Slovakia) Brezno-Osrblie	15 km Short Individual	(Norway) Endre Strømsheim	(Germany) Roman Rees	(Russia) Kirill Streltsov	(Germany) Lucas Fratzscher	
4	12 January 2020	(Slovakia) Brezno-Osrblie	10 km Sprint	(Germany) Philipp Nawrath	(Czech Republic) Vítězslav Hornig	(Germany) Roman Rees	(Germany) Philipp Nawrath	
5	17 January 2020	(Slovakia) Brezno-Osrblie	10 km Sprint	(Russia) Semen Suchilov	(Norway) Sivert Bakken	(Norway) Endre Strømsheim	(Germany) Lucas Fratzscher	
5	18 January 2020	(Slovakia) Brezno-Osrblie	12.5 km Pursuit	(Norway) Endre Strømsheim	(Ukraine) Ruslan Tkalenko	(Russia) Kirill Streltsov	(Norway) Endre Strømsheim	
6	8 February 2020	(Italy) Martell-Val Martello	10 km Sprint	(Norway) Endre Strømsheim	(France) Martin Perrillat Bottonet	(Germany) Lucas Fratzscher	(Norway) Endre Strømsheim	
6	9 February 2020	(Italy) Martell-Val Martello	Mass Start 60	(Norway) Sturla Holm Lægreid	(Germany) Lucas Fratzscher	(Germany) Roman Rees	(Norway) Endre Strømsheim	
7	13 February 2020	(Italy) Martell-Val Martello	Super Sprint	(Norway) Vebjørn Sørum	(Germany) Simon Schempp	(Russia) Kirill Streltsov	(Germany) Lucas Fratzscher	
7	15 February 2020	(Italy) Martell-Val Martello	10 km Sprint	(Switzerland) Jeremy Finello	(Russia) Said Karimulla Khalili	(Norway) Lars Helge Birkeland	(Norway) Endre Strømsheim	
7	16 February 2020	(Italy) Martell-Val Martello	12.5 km Pursuit	(Norway) Lars Helge Birkeland	(Germany) Erik Lesser	(Germany) Lucas Fratzscher	(Norway) Endre Strømsheim	
EC	26 February 2020	(Belarus) Minsk-Raubichi	Super Sprint	(Belarus) Sergey Bocharnikov	(Czech Republic) Adam Vaclavik	(Ukraine) Dmytro Pidruchnyi	(Norway) Endre Strømsheim	
EC	29 February 2020	(Belarus) Minsk-Raubichi	10 km Sprint	(Russia) Matvey Eliseev	(Latvia) Andrejs Rastorgujevs	(Norway) Aleksander Fjeld Andersen	(Germany) Lucas Fratzscher	
EC	1 March 2020	(Belarus) Minsk-Raubichi	12.5 km Pursuit	(Belarus) Sergey Bocharnikov	(Norway) Sturla Holm Lægreid	(Norway) Sivert Guttorm Bakken	(Germany) Lucas Fratzscher	
8	4 March 2020	(Belarus) Minsk-Raubichi	10 km Sprint	(Norway) Sivert Guttorm Bakken	(Belarus) Maksim Varabei	(Norway) Endre Strømsheim	(Germany) Lucas Fratzscher	
8	5 March 2020	(Belarus) Minsk-Raubichi	10 km Sprint	(Norway) Sivert Guttorm Bakken	(Norway) Lars Helge Birkeland	(France) Emilien Claude	(Germany) Lucas Fratzscher	
8	6 March 2020	(Belarus) Minsk-Raubichi	Mass Start 60	(Norway) Sivert Guttorm Bakken	(Norway) Lars Helge Birkeland	(Russia) Vasilii Tomshin	(Germany) Lucas Fratzscher	

=== Women ===
Stage	Date	Place	Discipline	Winner	Second	Third	Yellow bib (After competition)	Res.
1	28 November 2019	(Norway) Sjusjøen	7.5 km Sprint	(Norway) Karoline Erdal	(United States) Kelsey Joan Dickinson	(Germany) Maren Hammerschmidt	(Norway) Karoline Erdal	
1	30 November 2019	(Norway) Sjusjøen	7.5 km Sprint	(Russia) Irina Starykh	(Ukraine) Olena Pidhrushna	(Russia) Ekaterina Glazyrina	(Ukraine) Olena Pidhrushna	
1	1 December 2019	(Norway) Sjusjøen	10 km Pursuit	(Sweden) Elisabeth Högberg	(Russia) Irina Starykh	(Russia) Ekaterina Glazyrina	(Russia) Irina Starykh	
2	12 December 2019	(Italy) Ridnaun-Val Ridanna	Super Sprint	(Sweden) Ingela Andersson	(Ukraine) Anastasiya Merkushyna	(France) Lou Jeanmonnot	(Russia) Ekaterina Glazyrina	
2	14 December 2019	(Italy) Ridnaun-Val Ridanna	7.5 km Sprint	(Sweden) Johanna Skottheim	(Russia) Irina Starykh	(Russia) Anastasiia Porshneva	(Russia) Irina Starykh	
2	15 December 2019	(Italy) Ridnaun-Val Ridanna	Mass Start 60	(Russia) Anastasiia Porshneva	(Russia) Ekaterina Glazyrina	(Italy) Alexia Runggaldier	(Russia) Irina Starykh	
3	18 December 2019	(Austria) Obertilliach	12.5 km Short Individual	(Germany) Stefanie Scherer	(Ukraine) Anastasiya Merkushyna	(Germany) Anna Weidel	(Russia) Irina Starykh	
3	21 December 2018	(Austria) Obertilliach	7.5 km Sprint	(Sweden) Johanna Skottheim	(Sweden) Anna Magnusson	(Ukraine) Anastasiya Merkushyna	(Russia) Irina Starykh	
4	10 January 2020	(Slovakia) Brezno-Osrblie	12.5 km Short Individual	(Russia) Ekaterina Glazyrina	(Russia) Evgeniya Pavlova	(Italy) Alexia Runggaldier	(Russia) Ekaterina Glazyrina	
4	12 January 2020	(Slovakia) Brezno-Osrblie	7.5 km Sprint	(Russia) Evgeniya Pavlova	(Switzerland) Irene Cadurisch	(Germany) Vanessa Voigt	(Russia) Ekaterina Glazyrina	
5	17 January 2020	(Slovakia) Brezno-Osrblie	7.5 km Sprint	(Norway) Karoline Erdal	(Russia) Victoria Slivko	(Russia) Ekaterina Glazyrina	(Russia) Ekaterina Glazyrina	
5	18 January 2020	(Slovakia) Brezno-Osrblie	10 km Pursuit	(Sweden) Elisabeth Högberg	(Russia) Anastasiia Porshneva	(Germany) Franziska Hildebrand	(Russia) Ekaterina Glazyrina	
6	8 February 2020	(Italy) Martell-Val Martello	7.5 km Sprint	(Russia) Uliana Kaisheva	(Germany) Franziska Hildebrand	(Russia) Victoria Slivko	(Russia) Ekaterina Glazyrina	
6	9 February 2020	(Italy) Martell-Val Martello	Mass Start 60	(Norway) Ida Lien	(Germany) Franziska Hildebrand	(Ukraine) Yuliya Zhuravok	(Russia) Ekaterina Glazyrina	
7	13 February 2020	(Italy) Martell-Val Martello	Super Sprint	(Sweden) Ingela Andersson	(Russia) Evgeniya Pavlova	(Switzerland) Amy Baserga	(Russia) Ekaterina Glazyrina	
7	15 February 2020	(Italy) Martell-Val Martello	7.5 km Sprint	(Sweden) Elisabeth Högberg	(Norway) Synnoeve Solemdal	(Ukraine) Yuliya Zhuravok	(Russia) Ekaterina Glazyrina	
7	16 February 2020	(Italy) Martell-Val Martello	10 km Pursuit	(Sweden) Elisabeth Högberg	(Russia) Evgeniya Pavlova	(Russia) Uliana Kaisheva	(Russia) Ekaterina Glazyrina	
EC	26 February 2020	(Belarus) Minsk-Raubichi	Super Sprint	(Russia) Evgeniya Pavlova	(Ukraine) Olena Pidhrushna	(France) Chloé Chevalier	(Russia) Ekaterina Glazyrina	
EC	29 February 2020	(Belarus) Minsk-Raubichi	7.5 km Sprint	(Sweden) Elisabeth Högberg	(Norway) Ida Lien	(Belarus) Iryna Kryuko	(Russia) Ekaterina Glazyrina	
EC	1 March 2020	(Belarus) Minsk-Raubichi	10 km Pursuit	(Belarus) Elena Kruchinkina	(Russia) Kristina Reztsova	(Sweden) Elisabeth Högberg	(Russia) Ekaterina Glazyrina	
8	4 March 2020	(Belarus) Minsk-Raubichi	7.5 km Sprint	(Sweden) Elisabeth Högberg	(Germany) Stefanie Scherer	(Norway) Åsne Skrede	(Sweden) Elisabeth Högberg	
8	5 March 2020	(Belarus) Minsk-Raubichi	7.5 km Sprint	(Sweden) Ingela Andersson	(France) Caroline Colombo	(Russia) Ekaterina Glazyrina	(Sweden) Elisabeth Högberg	
8	6 March 2020	(Belarus) Minsk-Raubichi	Mass Start 60	(Germany) Stefanie Scherer	(Russia) Victoria Slivko	(France) Caroline Colombo	(Sweden) Elisabeth Högberg	

=== Mixed ===
Stage	Date	Place	Discipline	Winner	Second	Third	Res.
2	21 December 2019	(Austria) Obertilliach	1x6 km + 1x7.5 km Single Mixed Relay	Germany Stefanie Scherer; Lucas Fratzscher	Russia Anastasiia Porshneva; Alexander Povarnitsyn	Norway Karoline Erdal; Sindre Fjellheim Jorde	
2	21 December 2019	(Austria) Obertilliach	4x6 km Mixed Relay	Canceled			
6	15 January 2020	(Slovakia) Brezno-Osrblie	1x6 km + 1x7.5 km Single Mixed Relay	Norway Endre Strømsheim; Karoline Erdal	France Aristide Begue; Lou Jeanmonnot	Ukraine Vitaliy Trush; Yuliya Zhuravok	
6	15 January 2020	(Slovakia) Brezno-Osrblie	4x7.5 km Mixed Relay	Russia Vadim Filimonov; Semen Suchilov; Ekaterina Glazyrina; Victoria Slivko	Germany Lucas Fratzscher; Florian Hollandt; Franziska Hildebrand; Vanessa Voigt	Norway Sindre Pettersen; Haavard Bogetveit; Ida Lien; Emilie Kalkenberg	
EC	27 February 2020	(Belarus) Minsk-Raubichi	1x6 km + 1x7.5 km Single Mixed Relay	Norway Karoline Erdal; Endre Strømsheim	Germany Stefanie Scherer; Justus Strelow	Ukraine Anastasiya Merkushyna; Ruslan Tkalenko	
EC	27 February 2020	(Belarus) Minsk-Raubichi	4x6 km Mixed Relay	Ukraine Valentyna Semerenko; Yuliia Dzhima; Artem Pryma; Dmytro Pidruchnyi	Russia Kristina Reztsova; Victoria Slivko; Eduard Latypov; Said Karimulla Khalili	Norway Åsne Skrede; Ida Lien; Sivert Bakken; Aleksander Fjeld Andersen	

== Medal table ==
Rank	Nation	Gold	Silver	Bronze	Total
1	Norway	18	9	12	39
2	Sweden	11	1	1	13
3	Russia	9	13	12	34
4	Germany	6	11	11	28
5	Belarus	4	1	1	6
6	Ukraine	2	5	6	13
7	Switzerland	1	1	1	3
8	France	0	3	5	8
9	Czech Republic	0	2	0	2
9	United States	0	2	0	2
11	Italy	0	1	2	3
12	Austria	0	1	0	1
12	Latvia	0	1	0	1
Totals (13 entries)		51	51	51	153
