= 2018–19 Biathlon World Cup – Overall Men =

In the men's 2018–19 Biathlon World Cup total score, for each participating athlete the points earned in all Individual, Sprint, Pursuit and Mass start competitions held during the season are added up with the two lowest scores subtracted at the end of the season to give that athlete's final score. This includes the results from the Biathlon World Championships 2019 (held between the World Cup stages in Salt Lake City and Oslo).

== 2017–18 Top 3 standings ==
Medal	Athlete	Points
Gold:	(France) Martin Fourcade	1116
Silver:	(Norway) Johannes Thingnes Bø	1027
Bronze:	(Russia) Anton Shipulin	697

== Events summary ==
Event	Winner	Second	Third
Pokljuka 20 km Individual details	Martin Fourcade; France	Johannes Kühn; Germany	Simon Eder; Austria
Pokljuka 10 km Sprint details	Johannes Thingnes Bø; Norway	Antonin Guigonnat; France	Alexandr Loginov; Russia
Pokljuka 12.5 km Pursuit details	Johannes Thingnes Bø; Norway	Quentin Fillon Maillet; France	Alexandr Loginov; Russia
Hochfilzen 10 km Sprint details	Johannes Thingnes Bø; Norway	Martin Fourcade; France	Benedikt Doll; Germany
Hochfilzen 12.5 km Pursuit details	Martin Fourcade; France	Arnd Peiffer; Germany	Vetle Sjåstad Christiansen; Norway
Nové Mesto 10 km Sprint details	Johannes Thingnes Bø; Norway	Alexandr Loginov; Russia	Martin Ponsiluoma; Sweden
Nové Mesto 12.5 km Pursuit details	Johannes Thingnes Bø; Norway	Alexandr Loginov; Russia	Tarjei Bø; Norway
Nové Mesto 15 km Mass start details	Johannes Thingnes Bø; Norway	Quentin Fillon Maillet; France	Evgeniy Garanichev; Russia
Oberhof 10 km Sprint details	Alexandr Loginov; Russia	Johannes Thingnes Bø; Norway	Sebastian Samuelsson; Sweden
Oberhof 12.5 km Pursuit details	Johannes Thingnes Bø; Norway	Arnd Peiffer; Germany	Lukas Hofer; Italy
Ruhpolding 10 km Sprint details	Johannes Thingnes Bø; Norway	Tarjei Bø; Norway	Benedikt Doll; Germany
Ruhpolding 15 km Mass start details	Johannes Thingnes Bø; Norway	Julian Eberhard; Austria	Quentin Fillon Maillet; France
Antholz-Anterselva 10 km Sprint details	Johannes Thingnes Bø; Norway	Erlend Bjøntegaard; Norway	Antonin Guigonnat; France
Antholz-Anterselva 12.5 km Pursuit details	Johannes Thingnes Bø; Norway	Antonin Guigonnat; France	Quentin Fillon Maillet; France
Antholz-Anterselva 15 km Mass start details	Quentin Fillon Maillet; France	Johannes Thingnes Bø; Norway	Arnd Peiffer; Germany
Canmore 15 km Short Individual details	Johannes Thingnes Bø; Norway	Vetle Sjåstad Christiansen; Norway	Alexandr Loginov; Russia
Canmore 10 km Sprint details	cancelled due to cold weather		
Salt Lake City 10 km Sprint details	Vetle Sjåstad Christiansen; Norway	Simon Desthieux; France	Roman Rees; Germany
Salt Lake City 12.5 km Pursuit details	Quentin Fillon Maillet; France	Vetle Sjåstad Christiansen; Norway	Simon Desthieux; France
World Championships 10 km Sprint details	Johannes Thingnes Bø; Norway	Alexandr Loginov; Russia	Quentin Fillon Maillet; France
World Championships 12.5 km Pursuit details	Dmytro Pidruchnyi; Ukraine	Johannes Thingnes Bø; Norway	Quentin Fillon Maillet; France
World Championships 20 km Individual details	Arnd Peiffer; Germany	Vladimir Iliev; Bulgaria	Tarjei Bø; Norway
World Championships 15 km Mass Start details	Dominik Windisch; Italy	Antonin Guigonnat; France	Julian Eberhard; Austria
Oslo Holmenkollen 10 km Sprint details	Johannes Thingnes Bø; Norway	Lukas Hofer; Italy	Quentin Fillon Maillet; France
Oslo Holmenkollen 12.5 km Pursuit details	Johannes Thingnes Bø; Norway	Tarjei Bø; Norway	Arnd Peiffer; Germany
Oslo Holmenkollen 15 km Mass start details	Johannes Thingnes Bø; Norway	Arnd Peiffer; Germany	Benedikt Doll; Germany

== Standings ==
Point system
Place	IN	SP	PU	MS
1	60			
2	54			
3	48			
4	43			
5	40			
6	38			
7	36			
8	34			
9	32			
10	31			
11	30			
12	29			
13	28			
14	27			
15	26			
16	25			
17	24			
18	23			
19	22			
20	21			
21	20			
22	19			18
23	18			16
24	17			14
25	16			12
26	15			10
27	14			8
28	13			6
29	12			4
30	11			2
31	10			—
32	9			—
33	8			—
34	7			—
35	6			—
36	5			—
37	4			—
38	3			—
39	2			—
40	1			—

In each event places 1 to 40 (1 to 30 in a Mass start) are awarded points, a victory being worth 60 points. The full point system is shown in the table on the right. In a Mass start event only 30 athletes are allowed to participate and the points awarded for ranks 22 to 30 differ from the system used in other events. Equal placings (ties) give an equal number of points. An athlete's total World Cup Score is the sum of all World Cup points earned in the season, minus the points from 2 events in which the athletes got their worst scores. Ties in this score are broken by comparing the tied athletes' number of victories. If this number is the same for the athletes in question, the number of second places is compared, and so on. If a tie cannot be broken by this procedure, it remains a tie.

#	Name	POK IN	POK SP	POK PU	HOC SP	HOC PU	NOV SP	NOV PU	NOV MS	OBE SP	OBE PU	RUH SP	RUH MS	ANT SP	ANT PU	ANT MS	CAN SI	CAN SP	SLC SP	SLC PU	ÖST SP	ÖST PU	ÖST IN	ÖST MS	OSL SP	OSL PU	OSL MS	Total
1.	Johannes Thingnes Bø (NOR)	36	60	60	60	32	60	60	60	54	60	60	60	60	60	54	60	—	40	0 (Note: Johannes Thingnes Bø finished 4th in the Salt Lake City Pursuit, but came to an agreement with the IBU to not be awarded world cup points for the race after informing the IBU that he did not fire all five shots in the final shooting, finishing the race with a bullet in his magazine.)	60	54	32	~~28~~	60	60	60	1262
2	Alexandr Loginov (RUS)	~~12~~	48	48	34	36	54	54	26	60	40	40	24	15	36	21	48	—	~~13~~	36	54	27	27	43	32	28	23	854
3	Quentin Fillon Maillet (FRA)	~~9~~	30	54	~~2~~	21	29	36	54	13	19	23	48	36	48	60	16	—	38	60	48	48	29	40	48	29	16	843
4	Simon Desthieux (FRA)	~~19~~	36	26	36	30	40	43	36	32	38	26	38	38	43	23	30	—	54	48	40	~~9~~	38	30	36	34	36	831
5	Arnd Peiffer (GER)	0	11	16	40	54	24	25	43	40	54	19	36	32	38	48	28	—	—	—	32	28	60	38	34	48	54	802
6	Tarjei Bø (NOR)	6	43	38	13	29	34	48	25	34	28	54	31	25	26	14	—	—	—	—	28	43	48	32	40	54	31	724
7	Benedikt Doll (GER)	0	40	23	48	24	30	22	38	43	36	48	20	0	0	27	0	—	28	32	30	29	31	34	38	36	48	705
8	Simon Eder (AUT)	48	32	43	27	27	28	34	27	30	32	34	32	40	34	31	38	—	4	28	26	31	DNF	36	0	12	27	701
9	Julian Eberhard (AUT)	4	26	40	38	43	38	16	21	38	34	22	54	29	27	30	15	—	0	14	25	22	0	48	43	25	43	695
10	Lukas Hofer (ITA)	14	22	34	29	40	2	24	23	31	48	38	18	34	32	26	20	—	36	29	0	0	40	24	54	38	38	694
11	Antonin Guigonnat (FRA)	34	54	31	43	25	36	26	14	12	30	~~4~~	10	48	54	40	10	—	32	24	21	36	—	54	21	27	4	686
12	Martin Fourcade (FRA)	60	17	DNF	54	60	0	40	32	36	43	43	43	43	40	43	—	—	—	—	38	40	2	14	—	—	—	648
13	Vetle Sjåstad Christiansen (NOR)	30	0	—	31	48	9	21	20	0	9	29	40	0	12	29	54	—	60	54	10	18	34	29	29	40	40	646
14	Benjamin Weger (SUI)	0	29	32	30	38	43	19	29	12	29	30	34	6	28	38	4	—	34	38	31	34	0	23	0	—	6	567
15	Evgeniy Garanichev (RUS)	5	19	17	0	2	11	28	48	20	31	12	25	20	21	36	27	—	26	DNS	22	32	36	25	13	24	10	510
16	Erlend Bjøntegaard (NOR)	3	20	29	0	—	31	32	40	9	16	0	16	54	24	18	25	—	14	18	36	26	0	18	26	23	21	499
17	Dominik Windisch (ITA)	0	6	21	7	23	0	—	—	22	0	0	—	31	30	28	40	—	30	17	14	24	12	60	28	14	25	432
18	Dmytro Pidruchnyi (UKR)	—	0	1	9	15	22	38	24	16	20	21	4	22	9	10	DNS	—	8	27	43	60	—	31	12	11	22	425
19	Henrik L'Abée-Lund (NOR)	0	34	36	3	4	32	18	28	23	27	14	8	4	19	24	0	—	20	21	—	—	—	—	27	31	34	407
20	Andrejs Rastorgujevs (LAT)	—	25	9	5	DNS	—	—	—	18	15	28	21	24	18	25	18	—	12	22	27	38	28	12	0	20	30	395
21	Michal Krčmář (CZE)	26	31	24	21	17	21	9	31	6	0	16	23	28	29	16	0	—	15	6	0	16	18	6	15	0	18	392
22	Sebastian Samuelsson (SWE)	32	27	22	28	6	0	31	4	48	2	31	6	DNS	—	6	—	—	—	—	12	25	43	10	19	13	20	385
23	Erik Lesser (GER)	18	0	0	24	18	—	—	—	24	DNS	—	—	10	20	—	34	—	43	40	34	30	30	8	25	17	2	377
24	Émilien Jacquelin (FRA)	13	5	25	17	14	0	0	—	17	26	32	22	16	25	32	13	—	6	11	17	12	—	—	22	15	12	352
25	Sean Doherty (USA)	0	15	2	0	10	0	14	—	19	23	18	28	0	0	—	14	—	27	31	19	21	24	20	9	30	8	332
26	Jakov Fak (SLO)	43	2	19	32	28	25	17	30	—	—	0	—	—	—	—	—	—	—	—	24	15	0	27	18	22	26	328
27	Felix Leitner (AUT)	24	12	20	6	11	0	—	—	29	22	0	—	13	0	—	2	—	19	20	5	19	11	22	31	43	14	323
28	Johannes Kühn (GER)	54	0	0	18	16	19	11	12	2	10	36	2	0	13	20	5	—	23	8	18	17	—	—	11	9	—	304
29	Matvey Eliseev (RUS)	21	14	12	22	12	23	30	2	21	12	24	14	2	0	4	—	—	—	—	0	6	—	—	23	32	24	298
30	Ondrej Moravec (CZE)	11	21	18	0	13	18	23	34	28	24	10	26	9	DNS	12	—	—	—	—	0	—	4	—	4	21	—	276
#	Name	POK IN	POK SP	POK PU	HOC SP	HOC PU	NOV SP	NOV PU	NOV MS	OBE SP	OBE PU	RUH SP	RUH MS	ANT SP	ANT PU	ANT MS	CAN SI	CAN SP	SLC SP	SLC PU	ÖST SP	ÖST PU	ÖST IN	ÖST MS	OSL SP	OSL PU	OSL MS	Total
31	Lars Helge Birkeland (NOR)	31	16	6	—	—	—	—	—	0	13	20	27	26	31	34	43	—	—	—	—	—	23	—	2	0	—	272
32	Christian Gow (CAN)	25	24	27	DNS	—	21	20	6	8	14	0	30	0	—	8	31	—	0	34	0	—	DNF	—	0	—	—	248
33	Philipp Nawrath (GER)	—	—	—	—	—	—	—	—	—	—	11	—	12	0	—	24	—	29	19	29	20	—	26	30	4	32	236
34	Dominik Landertinger (AUT)	8	0	DNS	25	22	0	—	—	27	18	25	12	0	—	—	22	—	—	—	20	7	0	—	0	DNS	—	186
35	Artem Pryma (UKR)	20	28	30	15	0	7	7	8	0	DNF	0	—	30	15	22	—	—	—	—	—	—	—	—	1	0	—	183
36	Dmitry Malyshko (RUS)	29	0	—	0	0	27	12	18	26	21	0	—	0	14	—	—	—	—	—	8	11	—	—	0	7	—	173
37	Simon Fourcade (FRA)	—	—	—	—	—	—	—	—	0	25	17	—	8	17	—	36	—	18	26	—	—	22	—	0	—	—	169
38	Martin Ponsiluoma (SWE)	23	7	7	0	0	48	27	22	—	—	7	—	0	DNS	—	—	—	—	—	—	—	0	—	17	5	—	163
39	Krasimir Anev (BUL)	0	13	0	19	19	4	15	—	0	5	27	29	0	DNF	—	—	—	—	—	13	2	14	—	0	DNS	—	160
40	Jesper Nelin (SWE)	28	0	10	DNS	—	10	29	10	0	4	2	—	7	11	—	—	—	—	—	0	8	13	—	24	0	—	156
41	Tomáš Krupčík (CZE)	0	0	0	—	—	—	—	—	0	—	0	—	18	23	—	29	—	0	—	11	23	19	21	8	2	—	154
42	Roman Rees (GER)	—	—	—	—	—	17	4	—	—	—	9	—	19	DNS	—	12	—	48	23	—	—	21	—	0	—	—	153
43	Vladimir Iliev (BUL)	0	8	0	0	3	14	5	—	0	—	0	—	14	16	—	0	—	0	10	3	4	54	4	0	—	—	135
44	Simon Schempp (GER)	40	1	15	16	34	12	0	16	0	—	—	—	—	—	—	—	—	—	—	—	—	—	—	—	—	—	134
45	Jeremy Finello (SUI)	0	0	—	12	26	0	—	—	0	—	8	—	0	—	—	21	—	7	5	9	10	17	16	0	0	—	131
46	Thomas Bormolini (ITA)	0	18	14	0	—	0	—	—	0	—	5	—	0	22	—	19	—	11	13	0	14	0	—	3	10	—	129
47	Fabien Claude (FRA)	0	0	—	—	—	—	—	—	—	—	—	—	—	—	—	0	—	25	25	—	—	—	—	20	16	29	115
48	Scott Gow (CAN)	27	0	—	0	0	3	0	—	DNS	—	0	—	21	0	—	1	—	24	16	0	0	15	—	0	—	—	107
49	Klemen Bauer (SLO)	0	0	—	20	20	0	—	—	3	8	0	—	0	0	—	—	—	—	—	24	5	0	—	6	19	—	105
50	Johannes Dale (NOR)	—	—	—	—	—	26	13	—	—	—	—	—	—	—	—	0	—	31	30	—	—	—	—	0	—	—	100
51	Florent Claude (BEL)	0	0	5	26	31	5	1	—	1	0	3	—	0	4	—	6	—	0	7	0	—	9	—	0	—	—	98
52	Sindre Pettersen (NOR)	0	38	28	0	—	—	—	—	—	—	—	—	—	—	—	—	—	—	—	—	—	—	—	—	—	—	66
53	Alexander Povarnitsyn (RUS)	—	—	—	—	—	0	—	—	—	—	—	—	11	6	—	23	—	17	9	—	—	0	—	0	—	—	66
54	Serhiy Semenov (UKR)	38	4	3	0	—	6	10	—	4	0	0	—	—	—	—	0	—	—	—	—	—	0	—	0	—	—	65
55	Roman Yeremin (KAZ)	7	0	0	0	5	15	0	—	0	—	13	—	23	0	—	—	—	2	0	0	DNS	0	—	0	0	—	65
56	Lucas Fratzscher (GER)	—	—	—	—	—	—	—	—	0	—	—	—	—	—	—	—	—	—	—	—	—	—	—	10	26	28	64
57	Leif Nordgren (USA)	1	10	8	10	0	1	0	—	0	—	0	—	0	—	—	0	—	—	—	7	0	25	2	0	0	—	64
58	Martin Jäger (SUI)	—	—	—	—	—	—	—	—	0	0	0	—	27	5	2	0	—	9	15	0	0	0	—	0	—	—	58
59	Vladimir Chepelin (BLR)	0	0	—	0	—	—	—	—	25	3	0	—	0	1	—	—	—	—	—	1	0	26	—	0	0	—	56
60	Kalev Ermits (EST)	0	0	—	—	—	16	8	—	0	0	0	—	0	—	—	3	—	0	—	0	—	3	—	16	8	—	54
#	Name	POK IN	POK SP	POK PU	HOC SP	HOC PU	NOV SP	NOV PU	NOV MS	OBE SP	OBE PU	RUH SP	RUH MS	ANT SP	ANT PU	ANT MS	CAN SI	CAN SP	SLC SP	SLC PU	ÖST SP	ÖST PU	ÖST IN	ÖST MS	OSL SP	OSL PU	OSL MS	Total
61	Raman Yaliotnau (BLR)	0	0	—	0	0	0	0	—	7	11	1	—	0	10	—	0	—	—	—	0	—	8	—	14	3	—	54
62	Tero Seppälä (FIN)	3	0	—	0	0	0	0	—	5	0	0	—	0	0	—	—	—	—	—	6	13	10	—	0	6	—	43
63	Olli Hiidensalo (FIN)	0	0	—	0	0	0	—	—	0	DNS	0	—	DNS	—	—	—	—	—	—	16	0	0	—	8	18	—	42
64	Tobias Eberhard (AUT)	—	23	0	0	—	0	—	—	0	—	0	—	17	0	—	0	—	0	0	—	—	—	—	0	—	—	40
65	Serafin Wiestner (SUI)	0	0	11	23	DNS	—	—	—	0	—	0	—	—	—	—	0	—	5	0	0	0	—	—	0	—	—	39
66	Philipp Horn (GER)	0	0	13	8	8	0	—	—	—	—	0	—	—	—	—	—	—	—	—	—	—	—	—	5	0	—	34
67	Peppe Femling (SWE)	0	0	—	0	—	0	—	—	0	—	0	—	DNS	—	—	32	—	0	1	0	—	0	—	0	—	—	33
68	Martin Otčenáš (SVK)	0	3	0	14	9	0	—	—	0	7	0	—	0	—	—	0	—	—	—	0	0	0	—	0	—	—	33
69	Grzegorz Guzik (POL)	0	0	—	0	—	0	—	—	14	0	0	—	0	—	—	17	—	0	—	0	0	0	—	0	DNS	—	31
70	Roland Lessing (EST)	—	—	—	0	—	—	—	—	—	—	0	—	3	0	—	11	—	—	—	0	—	16	—	0	—	—	30
71	Michal Šlesingr (CZE)	0	0	DNS	0	DNS	DNS	—	—	—	—	—	—	—	—	—	0	—	22	DNS	—	—	6	—	0	—	—	28
72	Eduard Latypov (RUS)	0	0	0	0	—	—	—	—	—	—	—	—	0	—	—	26	—	0	0	—	—	—	—	0	—	—	26
73	Mario Dolder (SUI)	15	0	—	0	0	0	—	—	0	0	0	—	5	3	—	0	—	0	3	—	—	0	—	—	—	—	26
74	Dimitar Gerdzhikov (BUL)	0	—	—	4	DNS	0	0	—	0	DNF	0	—	DNS	—	—	0	—	0	DNS	0	0	20	—	0	—	—	24
75	Anton Sinapov (BUL)	22	0	0	0	—	0	—	—	0	DNS	0	—	0	0	—	0	—	1	0	0	—	DNF	—	0	DNS	—	23
76	Aidan Millar (CAN)	—	—	—	—	—	—	—	—	—	—	0	—	0	—	—	0	—	21	2	0	—	0	—	0	—	—	23
77	Thierry Chenal (ITA)	0	9	4	0	—	0	0	—	0	—	0	—	—	—	—	0	—	10	0	—	—	0	—	—	—	—	23
78	Sergey Bocharnikov (BLR)	—	0	—	0	—	—	—	—	0	6	15	—	0	—	—	—	—	—	—	0	—	0	—	0	1	—	22
79	Matej Kazár (SVK)	—	0	0	0	—	0	0	—	10	1	0	—	0	—	—	8	—	—	—	0	0	1	—	0	—	—	20
80	Miha Dovžan (SLO)	0	0	0	0	—	0	3	—	0	—	0	—	0	—	—	0	—	16	0	0	—	0	—	0	—	—	19
81	Timofey Lapshin (KOR)	0	0	DNF	11	1	—	—	—	—	—	—	—	DNF	—	—	0	—	—	—	0	—	7	—	0	—	—	19
82	Maxim Tsvetkov (RUS)	—	—	—	—	—	—	—	—	0	17	0	—	—	—	—	—	—	—	—	—	—	—	—	—	—	—	17
83	Mikito Tachizaki (JPN)	17	0	—	0	—	0	0	—	0	—	—	—	—	—	—	—	—	0	—	0	0	—	—	—	—	—	17
84	Rene Zahkna (EST)	0	0	—	0	—	0	—	—	0	—	0	—	0	2	—	0	—	3	12	0	—	—	—	0	—	—	17
85	Artem Tyshchenko (UKR)	10	—	—	—	—	0	—	—	—	—	0	—	0	—	—	7	—	0	DNS	0	—	0	—	—	—	—	17
86	Karol Dombrovski (LTU)	16	0	—	0	—	0	—	—	—	—	0	—	0	—	—	—	—	—	—	0	—	0	—	0	—	—	16
87	Anton Smolski (BLR)	0	0	0	0	—	0	—	—	15	0	0	—	0	0	—	—	—	—	—	0	—	0	—	0	0	—	15
88	Vytautas Strolia (LTU)	0	0	—	0	—	0	0	—	0	DNS	0	—	0	—	—	0	—	0	0	15	DSQ	0	—	0	—	—	15
89	Giuseppe Montello (ITA)	0	0	—	0	0	14	0	—	0	—	0	—	0	—	—	—	—	—	—	0	—	—	—	0	—	—	14
90	Jules Burnotte (CAN)	—	—	—	—	—	8	6	—	0	—	0	—	0	0	—	0	—	0	—	0	—	DNS	—	—	—	—	14
#	Name	POK IN	POK SP	POK PU	HOC SP	HOC PU	NOV SP	NOV PU	NOV MS	OBE SP	OBE PU	RUH SP	RUH MS	ANT SP	ANT PU	ANT MS	CAN SI	CAN SP	SLC SP	SLC PU	ÖST SP	ÖST PU	ÖST IN	ÖST MS	OSL SP	OSL PU	OSL MS	Total
91	Tuomas Grönman (FIN)	0	0	0	0	7	0	DNF	—	0	—	0	—	DNS	—	—	—	—	—	—	4	1	0	—	0	0	—	12
92	Tomáš Hasilla (SVK)	0	0	0	0	—	0	—	—	0	—	—	—	0	8	—	0	—	—	—	2	0	—	—	0	—	—	10
93	Taras Lesiuk (UKR)	—	—	—	—	—	—	—	—	—	—	—	—	—	—	—	9	—	0	—	—	—	—	—	—	—	—	9
94	Torstein Stenersen (SWE)	—	—	—	0	—	0	2	—	0	—	0	—	0	7	—	DNS	—	0	—	—	—	—	—	—	—	—	9
95	Tsukasa Kobonoki (JPN)	—	—	—	0	—	—	—	—	0	—	7	—	0	—	—	0	—	—	—	0	0	0	—	0	—	—	7
96	Nikita Porshnev (RUS)	—	—	—	—	—	—	—	—	—	—	—	—	—	—	—	—	—	—	—	—	—	5	—	0	—	—	5
97	Cornel Puchianu (ROU)	0	0	—	0	—	0	0	—	0	0	0	—	0	—	—	0	—	0	4	0	—	0	—	0	—	—	4
98	Ruslan Tkalenko (UKR)	—	—	—	—	—	—	—	—	0	—	—	—	0	—	—	—	—	—	—	0	3	0	—	—	—	—	3
99	Aristide Bègue (FRA)	—	—	—	1	0	0	—	—	—	—	—	—	—	—	—	—	—	—	—	—	—	—	—	0	0	—	1
100	Jake Brown (USA)	—	—	—	—	—	0	—	—	—	—	0	—	1	LAP	—	—	—	0	—	0	0	0	—	0	0	—	1
