= 2018–19 Biathlon IBU Cup =

Discipline	Men	Women
Overall	(Russia) Anton Babikov	(Russia) Victoria Slivko
Nations Cup	Russia	Russia
Individual	(Austria) Sven Grossegger	(Ukraine) Yuliya Zhuravok
Sprint	(Russia) Anton Babikov	(Russia) Victoria Slivko
Pursuit	(Russia) Anton Babikov	(Russia) Victoria Slivko
- Mixed: Russia

Competition

The 2018–19 Biathlon IBU Cup was a multi-race tournament over a season of biathlon, organised by the International Biathlon Union. IBU Cup is the second-rank competition in biathlon after the Biathlon World Cup. The season started on 26 November 2018 in Idre, Sweden and ended on 16 March 2019 in Martell-Val Martello, Italy. The defending overall champions from the 2017–18 Biathlon IBU Cup were Vetle Sjåstad Christiansen from Norway and Karolin Horchler from Germany.

== Calendar ==
Below is the IBU Cup calendar for the 2018–19 season.

Stage	Location	Date	Individual	Sprint	Pursuit	Mixed relay	Single mixed relay	Super sprint	Mass start 60	Details
1	(Sweden) Idre	26 November – 2 December		● ●	●					details
2	(Italy) Ridnaun-Val Ridanna	10–16 December		●	●	●	●			details
3	(Austria) Obertilliach	17–22 December	●	●				●		details
4	(Poland) Duszniki-Zdrój	7–13 January		● ●						details
5	(Germany) Arber	14–20 January	●	●	●					details
6	(Switzerland) Lenzerheide	21–27 January		●	●	●	●			details
EC	(Belarus) Minsk-Raubichi	18–24 February	●	●	●	●	●			European Championships
7	(Estonia) Otepää	25 February – 2 March		●				●		details
8	(Italy) Martell-Val Martello	11–17 March		● ●					●	details
Total: 52 (23 men's, 23 women's, 6 mixed)			3	12	5	3	3	2	1	

Notes

- All European Championships races included in the IBU Cup total score.
- Super sprint races were included in the sprint total score.

== IBU Cup podiums ==
=== Men ===
Stage	Date	Place	Discipline	Winner	Second	Third	Yellow bib (After competition)	Res.
1	29 November 2018	(Sweden) Idre	10 km Sprint	(Russia) Anton Babikov	(France) Aristide Bègue	(Germany) Lucas Fratzscher	(Russia) Anton Babikov	Res.
1	1 December 2018	(Sweden) Idre	10 km Sprint	(France) Aristide Bègue	(Germany) Dominic Reiter	(Germany) Justus Strelow	(France) Aristide Bègue	Res.
1	2 December 2018	(Sweden) Idre	12.5 km Pursuit	(Germany) Philipp Nawrath	(Russia) Alexander Povarnitsyn	(France) Martin Perrillat Bottonet	(France) Aristide Bègue	Res.
2	15 December 2018	(Italy) Ridnaun-Val Ridanna	10 km Sprint	(Norway) Johannes Dale	(Russia) Anton Babikov	(Norway) Sivert Guttorm Bakken	(Russia) Anton Babikov	Res.
2	16 December 2018	(Italy) Ridnaun-Val Ridanna	12.5 km Pursuit	(Norway) Johannes Dale	(Russia) Anton Babikov	(France) Simon Fourcade	(Russia) Anton Babikov	Res.
3	19 December 2018	(Austria) Obertilliach	20 km Individual	(France) Simon Fourcade	(Norway) Sivert Guttorm Bakken	(Belarus) Sergey Bocharnikov	(Norway) Sivert Guttorm Bakken	Res.
3	21 December 2018	(Austria) Obertilliach	Super Sprint	(Norway) Sindre Pettersen	(Austria) Lorenz Wäger	(Italy) Daniele Cappellari	(Norway) Sivert Guttorm Bakken	Res.
3	22 December 2018	(Austria) Obertilliach	10 km Sprint	(Norway) Sivert Guttorm Bakken	(Germany) Lucas Fratzscher	(France) Simon Fourcade	(Norway) Sivert Guttorm Bakken	Res.
4	12 January 2019	(Poland) Duszniki-Zdrój	10 km Sprint	(Russia) Alexander Povarnitsyn	(Russia) Nikita Porshnev	(Norway) Johannes Dale	(Norway) Sivert Guttorm Bakken	Res.
4	13 January 2019	(Poland) Duszniki-Zdrój	10 km Sprint	(Germany) Philipp Horn	(Russia) Anton Babikov	(Czech Republic) Adam Václavík	(Norway) Sivert Guttorm Bakken	Res.
5	17 January 2019	(Germany) Arber	15 km Short Individual	(Russia) Alexander Povarnitsyn	(Germany) Lucas Fratzscher	(France) Aristide Bègue	(Norway) Sivert Guttorm Bakken	Res.
5	19 January 2019	(Germany) Arber	10 km Sprint	(France) Aristide Bègue	(Norway) Johannes Dale	(Russia) Anton Babikov	(Norway) Sivert Guttorm Bakken	Res.
5	20 January 2019	(Germany) Arber	12.5 km Pursuit	(Russia) Anton Babikov	(France) Aristide Bègue	(Russia) Alexander Povarnitsyn	(Russia) Alexander Povarnitsyn	Res.
6	24 January 2019	(Switzerland) Lenzerheide	10 km Sprint	(France) Fabien Claude	(Switzerland) Serafin Wiestner	(Norway) Johannes Dale	(Russia) Anton Babikov	Res.
6	26 January 2019	(Switzerland) Lenzerheide	12.5 km Pursuit	(France) Fabien Claude	(Germany) Philipp Horn	(Russia) Anton Babikov	(Russia) Anton Babikov	
EC	20 February 2019	(Belarus) Minsk-Raubichi	20 km Individual	(Bulgaria) Krasimir Anev	(Norway) Tarjei Bø	(Norway) Endre Strømsheim	(Russia) Anton Babikov	
EC	23 February 2019	(Belarus) Minsk-Raubichi	10 km Sprint	(Norway) Tarjei Bø	(Sweden) Jesper Nelin	(Russia) Dmitry Malyshko	(Russia) Anton Babikov	
EC	24 February 2019	(Belarus) Minsk-Raubichi	12.5 km Pursuit	(Norway) Tarjei Bø	(Russia) Matvey Eliseev	(Norway) Håvard Gutubø Bogetveit	(Russia) Anton Babikov	
7	1 March 2019	(Estonia) Otepää	Super Sprint	(Norway) Endre Strømsheim	(Italy) Daniele Cappellari	(Norway) Henrik L'Abée-Lund	(Russia) Anton Babikov	
7	2 March 2019	(Estonia) Otepää	10 km Sprint	(Germany) David Zobel	(Norway) Henrik L'Abée-Lund	(Norway) Johannes Dale	(Russia) Anton Babikov	
8	14 March 2019	(Italy) Martell-Val Martello	10 km Sprint	(Norway) Johannes Dale	(Norway) Endre Strømsheim	(Norway) Aleksander Fjeld Andersen	(Russia) Anton Babikov	
8	16 March 2019	(Italy) Martell-Val Martello	10 km Sprint	(Germany) Lucas Fratzscher	(Germany) Philipp Horn	(Germany) Danilo Riethmüller	(Russia) Anton Babikov	
8	17 March 2019	(Italy) Martell-Val Martello	Mass Start 60	(France) Aristide Bègue	(Austria) Harald Lemmerer	(Germany) Matthias Dorfer	(Russia) Anton Babikov	

=== Women ===
Stage	Date	Place	Discipline	Winner	Second	Third	Yellow bib (After competition)	Res.
1	29 November 2018	(Sweden) Idre	7.5 km Sprint	(Sweden) Ingela Andersson	(Belarus) Irina Kruchinkina	(Russia) Anastasiia Morozova	(Sweden) Ingela Andersson	Res.
1	1 December 2018	(Sweden) Idre	7.5 km Sprint	(Sweden) Elisabeth Högberg	(Germany) Nadine Horchler	(Ukraine) Nadiia Bielkina	(Russia) Anastasiia Morozova	Res.
1	2 December 2018	(Sweden) Idre	10 km Pursuit	(Russia) Svetlana Mironova	(Sweden) Ingela Andersson	(Russia) Anastasiia Morozova	(Sweden) Ingela Andersson	Res.
2	15 December 2018	(Italy) Ridnaun-Val Ridanna	7.5 km Sprint	(Russia) Anastasiia Morozova	(Sweden) Ingela Andersson	(Ukraine) Nadiia Bielkina	(Russia) Anastasiia Morozova	Res.
2	16 December 2018	(Italy) Ridnaun-Val Ridanna	10 km Pursuit	(Russia) Anastasiia Morozova	(Russia) Victoria Slivko	(Russia) Svetlana Mironova	(Russia) Anastasiia Morozova	Res.
3	19 December 2018	(Austria) Obertilliach	15 km Individual	(France) Caroline Colombo	(Germany) Nadine Horchler	(Sweden) Elisabeth Högberg	(Sweden) Ingela Andersson	Res.
3	21 December 2018	(Austria) Obertilliach	Super Sprint	(Sweden) Felicia Lindqvist	(Sweden) Elisabeth Högberg	(Norway) Karoline Offigstad Knotten	(Sweden) Ingela Andersson	Res.
3	22 December 2018	(Austria) Obertilliach	7.5 km Sprint	(Canada) Nadia Moser	(Russia) Natalia Gerbulova	(Canada) Megan Bankes	(Sweden) Ingela Andersson	Res.
4	12 January 2019	(Poland) Duszniki-Zdrój	7.5 km Sprint	(Russia) Natalia Gerbulova	(Russia) Victoria Slivko	(Russia) Anastasiia Morozova	(Sweden) Ingela Andersson	Res.
4	13 January 2019	(Poland) Duszniki-Zdrój	7.5 km Sprint	(Russia) Natalia Gerbulova	(Sweden) Johanna Skottheim	(Ukraine) Nadiia Bielkina	(Sweden) Ingela Andersson	Res.
5	17 January 2019	(Germany) Arber	12.5 km Short Individual	(Ukraine) Yuliya Zhuravok	(Sweden) Chardine Sloof	(Sweden) Elisabeth Högberg	(Sweden) Ingela Andersson	Res.
5	19 January 2019	(Germany) Arber	7.5 km Sprint	(Russia) Victoria Slivko	(Sweden) Ingela Andersson	(Norway) Ragnhild Femsteinevik	(Sweden) Ingela Andersson	Res.
5	20 January 2019	(Germany) Arber	10 km Pursuit	(Russia) Victoria Slivko	(Germany) Nadine Horchler	(Sweden) Elisabeth Högberg	(Sweden) Ingela Andersson	Res.
6	24 January 2019	(Switzerland) Lenzerheide	7.5 km Sprint	(Russia) Victoria Slivko	(Russia) Uliana Kaisheva	(Germany) Janina Hettich	(Russia) Victoria Slivko	Res.
6	26 January 2019	(Switzerland) Lenzerheide	10 km Pursuit	(Russia) Uliana Kaisheva	(Russia) Victoria Slivko	(Russia) Valeriia Vasnetcova	(Russia) Victoria Slivko	
EC	20 February 2019	(Belarus) Minsk-Raubichi	15 km Individual	(Sweden) Hanna Öberg	(Ukraine) Yuliya Zhuravok	(Belarus) Iryna Kryuko	(Russia) Victoria Slivko	
EC	23 February 2019	(Belarus) Minsk-Raubichi	7.5 km Sprint	(Sweden) Mona Brorsson	(Russia) Ekaterina Yurlova-Percht	(Sweden) Hanna Öberg	(Russia) Victoria Slivko	
EC	24 February 2019	(Belarus) Minsk-Raubichi	10 km Pursuit	(Russia) Ekaterina Yurlova-Percht	(Belarus) Iryna Kryuko	(Germany) Nadine Horchler	(Russia) Victoria Slivko	
7	1 March 2019	(Estonia) Otepää	Super Sprint	(Germany) Anna Weidel	(Austria) Dunja Zdouc	(Norway) Thekla Brun-Lie	(Russia) Victoria Slivko	
7	2 March 2019	(Estonia) Otepää	7.5 km Sprint	(France) Chloé Chevalier	(Germany) Janina Hettich	(Germany) Juliane Frühwirt	(Russia) Victoria Slivko	
8	14 March 2019	(Italy) Martell-Val Martello	7.5 km Sprint	(Ukraine) Olga Abramova	(Russia) Kristina Reztsova	(Sweden) Johanna Skottheim	(Russia) Victoria Slivko	Res.
8	16 March 2019	(Italy) Martell-Val Martello	7.5 km Sprint	(France) Caroline Colombo	(Russia) Irina Kazakevich	(Russia) Victoria Slivko	(Russia) Victoria Slivko	
8	17 March 2019	(Italy) Martell-Val Martello	Mass Start 60	(France) Caroline Colombo	(Norway) Karoline Offigstad Knotten	(Germany) Stefanie Scherer	(Russia) Victoria Slivko	

=== Mixed ===
Stage	Date	Place	Discipline	Winner	Second	Third	Res.
2	13 December 2018	(Italy) Ridnaun-Val Ridanna	1x6 km + 1x7.5 km Single Mixed Relay	Russia Anastasiia Morozova; Sergey Korastylev	Germany Laura Dahlmeier; Roman Rees	Ukraine Yuliya Zhuravok; Vitaliy Trush	
2	13 December 2018	(Italy) Ridnaun-Val Ridanna	2x6 km + 2x7.5 km Mixed Relay	Russia Irina Kazakevich; Svetlana Mironova; Yury Shopin; Anton Babikov	Sweden Johanna Skottheim; Elisabeth Högberg; Oskar Brandt; Simon Hallstroem	Norway Karoline Offigstad Knotten; Eline Grue; Vebjørn Sørum; Fredrik Gjessbakk	
6	27 January 2019	(Switzerland) Lenzerheide	1x6 km + 1x7.5 km Single Mixed Relay	Russia Uliana Kaisheva; Sergey Korastylev	Germany Marie Heinrich; Marco Gross	Ukraine Mariya Kruchova; Vitaliy Trush	
6	27 January 2019	(Switzerland) Lenzerheide	2x6 km + 2x7.5 km Mixed Relay	Russia Valeriia Vasnetcova; Victoria Slivko; Anton Babikov; Alexey Slepov	Germany Janina Hettich; Nadine Horchler; Lucas Fratzscher; Philipp Horn	Norway Ragnhild Femsteinevik; Emilie Aagheim Kalkenberg; Håvard Gutubø Bogetveit; Johannes Dale	
EC	21 February 2019	(Belarus) Minsk-Raubichi	1x6 km + 1x7.5 km Single Mixed Relay	Russia Evgeniya Pavlova; Dmitry Malyshko	Sweden Anna Magnusson; Jesper Nelin	France Lou Jeanmonnot; Aristide Bègue	
EC	21 February 2019	(Belarus) Minsk-Raubichi	2x6 km + 2x7.5 km Mixed Relay	Sweden Emma Nilsson; Mona Brorsson; Martin Ponsiluoma; Sebastian Samuelsson	Germany Nadine Horchler; Janina Hettich; Lucas Fratzscher; Philipp Horn	Belarus Dzinara Alimbekava; Hanna Sola; Raman Yaliotnau; Sergey Bocharnikov	

== Standings (men) ==
=== Overall ===
Pos.		Points
1.	(Russia) Anton Babikov	703
2.	(Germany) Lucas Fratzscher	639
3.	(France) Aristide Bègue	638
4.	(Russia) Sergey Korastylev	588
5.	(Norway) Johannes Dale	569

- Final standings after 23 races.

=== Individual ===
Pos.		Points
1.	(Austria) Sven Grossegger	99
2.	(Norway) Fredrik Gjesbakk	95
3.	(Belarus) Sergey Bocharnikov	73
4.	(Bulgaria) Krasimir Anev	60
4.	(France) Simon Fourcade	60
4.	(Russia) Alexander Povarnitsyn	60

- Final standings after 3 races.

=== Sprint ===
Pos.		Points
1.	(Russia) Anton Babikov	437
2.	(Russia) Sergey Korastylev	417
3.	(Germany) Lucas Fratzscher	415
4.	(France) Aristide Bègue	388
5.	(Norway) Johannes Dale	352

- Final standings after 14 races.

=== Pursuit ===
Pos.		Points
1.	(Russia) Anton Babikov	216
2.	(Norway) Håvard Bogetveit	143
3.	(Norway) Johannes Dale	141
4.	(Russia) Alexander Povarnitsyn	138
5.	(Germany) Lucas Fratzscher	133

- Final standings after 5 races.

=== Mixed relay ===
Pos.		Points
1.	Russia	343
2.	Germany	294
3.	Norway	258
4.	France	240
5.	Ukraine	228

- Final standings after 6 races.

=== Nation ===
Pos.		Points
1.	Russia	7613
2.	Norway	7542
3.	Germany	7350
4.	France	6510
5.	Ukraine	6289

- Final standings after 23 races.

== Standings (women) ==
=== Overall ===
Pos.		Points
1.	(Russia) Victoria Slivko	775
2.	(Germany) Nadine Horchler	628
3.	(Sweden) Ingela Andersson	605
4.	(Germany) Janina Hettich	580
5.	(Ukraine) Nadiia Bielkina	544

- Final standings after 23 races.

=== Individual ===
Pos.		Points
1.	(Ukraine) Yuliya Zhuravok	152
2.	(Germany) Nadine Horchler	131
3.	(Russia) Victoria Slivko	104
4.	(Sweden) Elisabeth Högberg	96
5.	(China) Fanqi Meng	72

- Final standings after 3 races.

=== Sprint ===
Pos.		Points
1.	(Russia) Victoria Slivko	449
2.	(Sweden) Ingela Andersson	432
3.	(Ukraine) Nadiia Bielkina	374
4.	(Germany) Janina Hettich	366
5.	(Sweden) Johanna Skottheim	344

- Final standings after 14 races.

=== Pursuit ===
Pos.		Points
1.	(Russia) Victoria Slivko	182
2.	(Germany) Nadine Horchler	165
3.	(Germany) Janina Hettich	155
4.	(Russia) Svetlana Mironova	139
5.	(Sweden) Ingela Andersson	130

- Final standings after 5 races.

=== Mixed relay ===
Pos.		Points
1.	Russia	343
2.	Germany	294
3.	Norway	258
4.	France	240
5.	Ukraine	228

- Final standings after 6 races.

=== Nation ===
Pos.		Points
1.	Russia	7731
2.	Sweden	7336
3.	Germany	7206
4.	Ukraine	6864
5.	Norway	6826

- Final standings after 23 races.

== Medal table ==
Rank	Nation	Gold	Silver	Bronze	Total
1	Russia	19	14	10	43
2	France	10	2	5	17
3	Norway	8	6	13	27
4	Sweden	6	9	5	20
5	Germany	5	13	8	26
6	Ukraine	2	1	5	8
7	Canada	1	0	1	2
8	Bulgaria	1	0	0	1
9	Austria	0	3	0	3
10	Belarus	0	2	3	5
11	Italy	0	1	1	2
12	Switzerland	0	1	0	1
13	Czech Republic	0	0	1	1
Totals (13 entries)		52	52	52	156
