= 2018–19 Biathlon World Cup – Sprint Men =

The 2018–19 Biathlon World Cup – Sprint Men started on Friday 7 December 2018 in Pokljuka and finished on Friday 22 March 2019 in Oslo Holmenkollen. The defending titlist was Martin Fourcade of France.

The small crystal globe winner for the category was Johannes Thingnes Bø of Norway.

== Competition format ==
The 10 kilometres (6.2 mi) sprint race is the third oldest biathlon event; the distance is skied over three laps. The biathlete shoots two times at any shooting lane, first prone, then standing, totalling 10 targets. For each missed target the biathlete has to complete a penalty lap of around 150 metres (490 ft). Competitors' starts are staggered, normally by 30 seconds.

== 2017–18 Top 3 standings ==
| Medal | Athlete | Points |
|---|---|---|
| Gold: | (France) Martin Fourcade | 222 |
| Silver: | (Norway) Johannes Thingnes Bø | 198 |
| Bronze: | (Slovenia) Jakov Fak | 143 |

== Medal winners ==
| Event | Gold | Time | Silver | Time | Bronze | Time |
|---|---|---|---|---|---|---|
| Pokljuka details | Johannes Thingnes Bø; Norway | 23:46.3 (0+1) | Antonin Guigonnat; France | 24:02.4 (0+0) | Alexandr Loginov; Russia | 24:02.7 (0+0) |
| Hochfilzen details | Johannes Thingnes Bø; Norway | 24:49.2 (0+1) | Martin Fourcade; France | 24:57.8 (0+0) | Benedikt Doll; Germany | 24:59.4 (0+0) |
| Nové Město details | Johannes Thingnes Bø; Norway | 23:09.9 (0+0) | Alexandr Loginov; Russia | 23:30.9 (0+0) | Martin Ponsiluoma; Sweden | 24:04.1 (0+0) |
| Oberhof details | Alexandr Loginov; Russia | 25:50.9 (0+0) | Johannes Thingnes Bø; Norway | 26:16.1 (0+1) | Sebastian Samuelsson; Sweden | 26:27.7 (0+0) |
| Ruhpolding details | Johannes Thingnes Bø; Norway | 22:56.3 (0+1) | Tarjei Bø; Norway | 23:04.2 (0+0) | Benedikt Doll; Germany | 23:06.8 (0+1) |
| Antholz-Anterselva details | Johannes Thingnes Bø; Norway | 23:53.9 (0+1) | Erlend Bjøntegaard; Norway | 24:11.4 (0+0) | Antonin Guigonnat; France | 24:14.1 (0+1) |
| Canmore details | cancelled due to cold weather | | | | | |
| Soldier Hollow, Utah details | Vetle Sjåstad Christiansen; Norway | 23:29.7 (0+0) | Simon Desthieux; France | 23:31.0 (1+0) | Roman Rees; Germany | 23:52.1 (0+1) |
| World Championships details | Johannes Thingnes Bø; Norway | 24:37.6 (0+1) | Alexandr Loginov; Russia | 24:51.3 (0+0) | Quentin Fillon Maillet; France | 24:54.1 (0+0) |
| Oslo Holmenkollen details | Johannes Thingnes Bø; Norway | 24:39.9 (0+1) | Lukas Hofer; Italy | 25:11.6 (0+0) | Quentin Fillon Maillet; France | 25:14.9 (0+0) |

== Standings ==
| # | Name | POK | HOC | NOV | OBE | RUH | ANT | SOL | ÖST | OSL | Total |
|---|---|---|---|---|---|---|---|---|---|---|---|
| 1 | Johannes Thingnes Bø (NOR) | 60 | 60 | 60 | 54 | 60 | 60 | 40 | 60 | 60 | 514 |
| 2 | Alexandr Loginov (RUS) | 48 | 34 | 54 | 60 | 40 | 15 | 13 | 54 | 32 | 350 |
| 3 | Simon Desthieux (FRA) | 36 | 36 | 40 | 32 | 26 | 38 | 54 | 40 | 36 | 338 |
| 4 | Benedikt Doll (GER) | 40 | 48 | 30 | 43 | 48 | 0 | 28 | 30 | 38 | 305 |
| 5 | Antonin Guigonnat (FRA) | 54 | 43 | 36 | 12 | 4 | 48 | 32 | 21 | 21 | 271 |
| 6 | Tarjei Bø (NOR) | 43 | 13 | 34 | 34 | 54 | 25 | — | 28 | 40 | 271 |
| 7 | Quentin Fillon Maillet (FRA) | 30 | 2 | 29 | 13 | 23 | 36 | 38 | 48 | 48 | 267 |
| 8 | Julian Eberhard (AUT) | 26 | 38 | 38 | 38 | 22 | 29 | 0 | 25 | 43 | 259 |
| 9 | Lukas Hofer (ITA) | 22 | 29 | 2 | 31 | 38 | 34 | 36 | 0 | 54 | 246 |
| 10 | Arnd Peiffer (GER) | 11 | 40 | 24 | 40 | 19 | 32 | — | 32 | 34 | 232 |
| 11 | Martin Fourcade (FRA) | 17 | 54 | 0 | 36 | 43 | 43 | — | 38 | — | 231 |
| 12 | Simon Eder (AUT) | 32 | 27 | 28 | 30 | 34 | 40 | 4 | 26 | 0 | 221 |
| 13 | Benjamin Weger (SUI) | 29 | 30 | 43 | 12 | 30 | 6 | 34 | 31 | 0 | 215 |
| 14 | Erlend Bjøntegaard (NOR) | 20 | 0 | 31 | 9 | 0 | 54 | 14 | 36 | 26 | 190 |
| 15 | Vetle Sjåstad Christiansen (NOR) | 0 | 31 | 9 | 0 | 29 | 0 | 60 | 10 | 29 | 168 |
| 16 | Sebastian Samuelsson (SWE) | 27 | 28 | 0 | 48 | 31 | DNS | — | 12 | 19 | 165 |
| 17 | Erik Lesser (GER) | 0 | 24 | — | 24 | — | 10 | 43 | 34 | 25 | 160 |
| 18 | Henrik L'Abée-Lund (NOR) | 34 | 3 | 32 | 23 | 14 | 4 | 20 | — | 27 | 157 |
| 19 | Dmytro Pidruchnyi (UKR) | 0 | 9 | 22 | 16 | 21 | 22 | 8 | 43 | 12 | 153 |
| 20 | Michal Krčmář (CZE) | 31 | 21 | 21 | 6 | 16 | 28 | 15 | 0 | 15 | 153 |
| 21 | Evgeniy Garanichev (RUS) | 19 | 0 | 11 | 20 | 12 | 20 | 26 | 22 | 13 | 143 |
| 22 | Andrejs Rastorgujevs (LAT) | 25 | 5 | — | 18 | 28 | 24 | 12 | 27 | 0 | 139 |
| 23 | Dominik Windisch (ITA) | 6 | 7 | 0 | 22 | 0 | 31 | 30 | 14 | 28 | 138 |
| 24 | Emilien Jacquelin (FRA) | 5 | 17 | 0 | 17 | 32 | 16 | 6 | 17 | 22 | 132 |
| 25 | Matvey Eliseev (RUS) | 14 | 22 | 23 | 21 | 24 | 2 | — | 0 | 23 | 129 |
| 26 | Johannes Kühn (GER) | 0 | 18 | 19 | 2 | 36 | 0 | 23 | 18 | 11 | 127 |
| 27 | Felix Leitner (AUT) | 12 | 6 | 0 | 29 | 0 | 13 | 19 | 5 | 31 | 115 |
| 28 | Philipp Nawrath (GER) | — | — | — | — | 11 | 12 | 29 | 29 | 30 | 111 |
| 29 | Sean Doherty (USA) | 15 | 0 | 0 | 19 | 18 | 0 | 27 | 19 | 9 | 107 |
| 30 | Jakov Fak (SLO) | 2 | 32 | 25 | — | 0 | — | — | 24 | 18 | 101 |
| # | Name | POK | HOC | NOV | OBE | RUH | ANT | SOL | ÖST | OSL | Total |
| 31 | Dominik Landertinger (AUT) | 0 | 25 | 0 | 27 | 25 | 0 | — | 20 | 0 | 97 |
| 32 | Roman Rees (GER) | — | — | 17 | — | 9 | 19 | 48 | — | 0 | 93 |
| 33 | Ondřej Moravec (CZE) | 21 | 0 | 18 | 28 | 10 | 9 | — | 0 | 4 | 90 |
| 34 | Artem Pryma (UKR) | 28 | 15 | 7 | 0 | 0 | 30 | — | — | 1 | 81 |
| 35 | Martin Ponsiluoma (SWE) | 7 | 0 | 48 | — | 7 | 0 | — | — | 17 | 79 |
| 36 | Krasimir Anev (BUL) | 13 | 19 | 4 | 0 | 27 | 0 | — | 13 | 0 | 76 |
| 37 | Lars Helge Birkeland (NOR) | 16 | — | — | 0 | 20 | 26 | — | — | 2 | 64 |
| 38 | Dmitry Malyshko (RUS) | 0 | 0 | 27 | 26 | 0 | 0 | — | 8 | 0 | 61 |
| 39 | Johannes Dale (NOR) | — | — | 26 | — | — | — | 31 | — | 0 | 57 |
| 40 | Christian Gow (CAN) | 24 | DNS | 21 | 8 | 0 | 0 | 0 | 0 | 0 | 53 |
| 41 | Klemen Bauer (SLO) | 0 | 20 | 0 | 3 | 0 | 0 | — | 24 | 6 | 53 |
| 42 | Roman Yeremin (KAZ) | 0 | 0 | 15 | 0 | 13 | 23 | 2 | 0 | 0 | 53 |
| 43 | Scott Gow (CAN) | 0 | 0 | 3 | DNS | 0 | 21 | 24 | 0 | 0 | 48 |
| 44 | Fabien Claude (FRA) | 0 | — | — | — | — | — | 25 | — | 20 | 45 |
| 45 | Jesper Nelin (SWE) | 0 | DNS | 10 | 0 | 2 | 7 | — | 0 | 24 | 43 |
| 46 | Simon Fourcade (FRA) | — | — | — | 0 | 17 | 8 | 18 | — | 0 | 43 |
| 47 | Tobias Eberhard (AUT) | 23 | 0 | 0 | 0 | 0 | 17 | 0 | — | 0 | 40 |
| 48 | Vladimir Iliev (BUL) | 8 | 0 | 14 | 0 | 0 | 14 | 0 | 3 | 0 | 39 |
| 49 | Sindre Pettersen (NOR) | 38 | 0 | — | — | — | — | — | — | — | 38 |
| 50 | Tomáš Krupčík (CZE) | 0 | — | — | 0 | 0 | 18 | 0 | 11 | 8 | 37 |
| 51 | Thomas Bormolini (ITA) | 18 | 0 | 0 | 0 | 5 | 0 | 11 | 0 | 3 | 37 |
| 52 | Martin Jäger (SUI) | — | — | — | 0 | 0 | 27 | 9 | 0 | 0 | 36 |
| 53 | Jeremy Finello (SUI) | 0 | 12 | 0 | 0 | 8 | 0 | 7 | 9 | 0 | 36 |
| 54 | Florent Claude (BEL) | 0 | 26 | 5 | 1 | 3 | 0 | 0 | 0 | 0 | 35 |
| 55 | Kalev Ermits (EST) | 0 | — | 16 | 0 | 0 | 0 | 0 | 0 | 16 | 32 |
| 56 | Simon Schempp (GER) | 1 | 16 | 12 | 0 | — | — | — | — | — | 29 |
| 57 | Serafin Wiestner (SUI) | 0 | 23 | — | 0 | 0 | — | 5 | 0 | 0 | 28 |
| 58 | Alexander Povarnitsyn (RUS) | — | — | 0 | — | — | 11 | 17 | — | 0 | 28 |
| 59 | Leif Nordgren (USA) | 10 | 10 | 1 | 0 | 0 | 0 | — | 7 | 0 | 28 |
| 60 | Vladimir Chepelin (BLR) | 0 | 0 | — | 25 | 0 | 0 | — | 1 | 0 | 26 |
| # | Name | POK | HOC | NOV | OBE | RUH | ANT | SOL | ÖST | OSL | Total |
| 61 | Olli Hiidensalo (FIN) | 0 | 0 | 0 | 0 | 0 | DNS | — | 16 | 8 | 24 |
| 62 | Michal Šlesingr (CZE) | 0 | 0 | DNS | — | — | — | 22 | — | 0 | 22 |
| 63 | Raman Yaliotnau (BLR) | 0 | 0 | 0 | 7 | 1 | 0 | — | 0 | 14 | 22 |
| 64 | Aidan Millar (CAN) | — | — | — | — | 0 | 0 | 21 | 0 | 0 | 21 |
| 65 | Thierry Chenal (ITA) | 9 | 0 | 0 | 0 | 0 | — | 10 | — | — | 19 |
| 66 | Martin Otčenáš (SVK) | 3 | 14 | 0 | 0 | 0 | 0 | — | 0 | 0 | 17 |
| 67 | Miha Dovzan (SLO) | 0 | 0 | 0 | 0 | 0 | 0 | 16 | 0 | 0 | 16 |
| 68 | Sergey Bocharnikov (BLR) | 0 | 0 | — | 0 | 15 | 0 | — | 0 | 0 | 15 |
| 69 | Vytautas Strolia (LTU) | 0 | 0 | 0 | 0 | 0 | 0 | 0 | 15 | 0 | 15 |
| 70 | Anton Smolski (BLR) | 0 | 0 | 0 | 15 | 0 | 0 | — | 0 | 0 | 15 |
| 71 | Giuseppe Montello (ITA) | 0 | 0 | 14 | 0 | 0 | 0 | — | 0 | 0 | 14 |
| 72 | Grzegorz Guzik (POL) | 0 | 0 | 0 | 14 | 0 | 0 | 0 | 0 | 0 | 14 |
| 73 | Serhiy Semenov (UKR) | 4 | 0 | 6 | 4 | 0 | — | — | — | 0 | 14 |
| 74 | Philipp Horn (GER) | 0 | 8 | 0 | — | 0 | — | — | — | 5 | 13 |
| 75 | Timofey Lapshin (KOR) | 0 | 11 | — | — | — | DNF | — | 0 | 0 | 11 |
| 76 | Tero Seppala (FIN) | 0 | 0 | 0 | 5 | 0 | 0 | — | 6 | 0 | 11 |
| 77 | Matej Kazár (SVK) | 0 | 0 | 0 | 10 | 0 | 0 | — | 0 | 0 | 10 |
| 78 | Lucas Fratzscher (GER) | — | — | — | 0 | — | — | — | — | 10 | 10 |
| 79 | Jules Burnotte (CAN) | — | — | 8 | 0 | 0 | 0 | 0 | 0 | — | 8 |
| 80 | Tsukasa Kobonoki (JPN) | 0 | 0 | — | 0 | 7 | 0 | — | 0 | 0 | 7 |
| 81 | Mario Dolder (SUI) | 0 | 0 | 0 | 0 | 0 | 5 | 0 | — | — | 5 |
| 82 | Tuomas Grönman (FIN) | 0 | 0 | 0 | 0 | 0 | DNS | — | 4 | 0 | 4 |
| 83 | Dimitar Gerdzhikov (BUL) | — | 4 | 0 | 0 | 0 | DNS | 0 | 0 | 0 | 4 |
| 84 | Roland Lessing (EST) | — | 0 | — | — | 0 | 3 | — | 0 | 0 | 3 |
| 85 | Rene Zahkna (EST) | 0 | 0 | 0 | 0 | 0 | 0 | 3 | 0 | 0 | 3 |
| 86 | Tomáš Hasilla (SVK) | 0 | 0 | 0 | 0 | — | 0 | — | 2 | 0 | 2 |
| 87 | Anton Sinapov (BUL) | 0 | 0 | 0 | 0 | 0 | 0 | 1 | 0 | 0 | 1 |
| 88 | Jake Brown (USA) | — | — | 0 | — | 0 | 1 | 0 | 0 | 0 | 1 |
| 89 | Aristide Begue (FRA) | — | 1 | 0 | — | — | — | — | — | 0 | 1 |
