= Ida Lien =

Norwegian biathlete (born 1997)

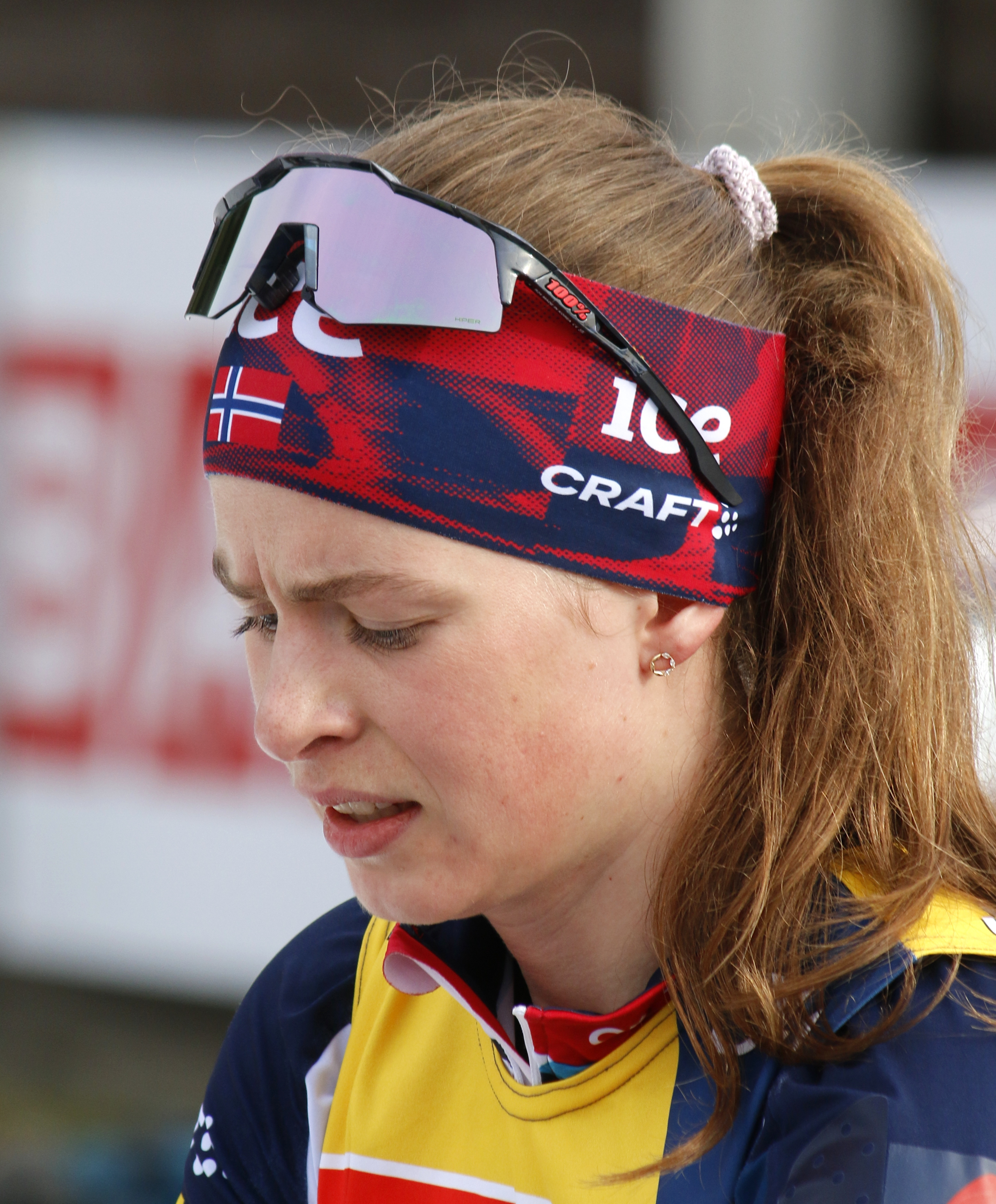
- Lien in 2024

Personal information
- Nationality: Norwegian
- Born: 5 April 1997 (age 29) Drammen, Norway
- Height: 171 cm (5 ft 7 in)

Sport
- Coached by: Sverre Huber Kaas; Patrick Oberegger

Professional information
- Club: Simostranda IL
- Skis: Fischer
- Rifle: Anschütz
- World Cup debut: 5 March 2020

Olympic Games
- Teams: 1 (2022)

World Championships
- Teams: 4 (2021, 2023, 2024, 2025)
- Medals: 1 (1 gold)

World Cup
- Seasons: 5 (2019/20–)
- Individual races: 79
- All races: 95
- Individual victories: 0
- All victories: 6
- Individual podiums: 1
- All podiums: 10
- Overall titles: 0
- Discipline titles: 0
Medal record
Women's biathlon
Representing Norway
World Championships
| Gold medal – first place | 2021 Pokljuka | 4 x 6 km relay |
European Championships
| Gold medal – first place | 2024 Osrblie | 7.5 km sprint |
| Gold medal – first place | 2024 Osrblie | Mixed relay |
| Silver medal – second place | 2020 Raubichi | 7.5 km sprint |
| Bronze medal – third place | 2020 Raubichi | Mixed relay |

Ida Lien (born 5 April 1997) is a Norwegian biathlete. She is the 2021 World Champion in the women's relay.

== Career ==
=== 2017—2020: European Championship medals and first World Cup victory ===
Ida Lien made her international debut at the 2017 Junior European Championships in Nové Město na Moravě, Czech Republic. However, those races remained her only appearances at the junior level. Two years later, she participated in her next international competitions at the 2019 European Championships in Minsk. There, she stood out with a ninth place in the sprint and seventh in the pursuit, securing two Top-10 finishes right away. For the remainder of the 2018/19 season, she competed in the IBU Cup, achieving another Top-10 result with a seventh place in the sprint in Otepää. In the following season, Lien started the IBU Cup from the beginning. After two more Top-10 finishes in the sprint races in Sjusjøen and Osrblie, she achieved her first podium finish in the mixed relay in Osrblie, teaming up with Sindre Pettersen, Håvard Bogetveit, and Emilie Kalkenberg to take third place. Following three consecutive ninth-place finishes, she claimed her first IBU Cup victory in the Mass Start 60 in Martell. At the 2020 European Championships, Lien won a bronze medal in the mixed relay alongside Åsne Skrede, Sivert Bakken, and Aleksander Fjeld Andersen. She also earned a silver medal in the sprint, finishing behind Elisabeth Högberg after a flawless shooting performance. She capped off the competition with a tenth-place finish in the pursuit. On 5 March 2020, she competed in her first World Cup race in Nové Město na Moravě. In the sprint, four shooting misses and a time deficit of over three minutes kept her well out of the points and the pursuit qualification. Two days later, she substituted for ill world champions Synnøve Solemdal and Marte Olsbu Røiseland in the relay race. Partnering with Karoline Offigstad Knotten, Ingrid Landmark Tandrevold, and Tiril Eckhoff, she achieved a victory on her debut.

=== 2020—2022: Breakthrough season and continued success ===
At the start of the 2020/21 season, which Ida Lien competed entirely in the World Cup, she scored her first World Cup points by finishing 30th in the individual race in Kontiolahti. Shortly after, she came close to the Top 10 with a 12th place in the sprint in Hochfilzen. Lien had a particularly successful debut at the World Championships. She achieved Top-17 finishes in the individual, sprint, and pursuit races, qualifying for her first mass start. Running third in the women’s relay, she kept the team in the lead, ultimately securing the gold medal alongside Ingrid Landmark Tandrevold, Tiril Eckhoff, and Marte Olsbu Røiseland. Throughout the season, Lien consistently earned World Cup points and, in March 2021, achieved her first Top-10 individual result with a ninth-place finish in the Östersund sprint. She ended the season ranked 29th in the overall standings, the fifth-best Norwegian athlete. In the 2021/22 season, Lien's performances peaked in December, highlighted by a fourth-place finish in the Hochfilzen sprint, where she narrowly missed her first podium by just over two seconds. After a series of average results, she impressed in Antholz, bringing the Norwegian women’s relay team from a significant deficit to the lead with flawless standing shooting, contributing to their eventual victory. Lien also participated in the 2022 Beijing Olympics but struggled in individual races, finishing outside the Top 30. In the relay, she placed fourth after Tiril Eckhoff incurred two penalty loops. The season concluded with another relay win in Kontiolahti and Lien ranking 36th overall in the World Cup standings.

=== 2023—2024: Inconsistent performances and two European Championship victories ===
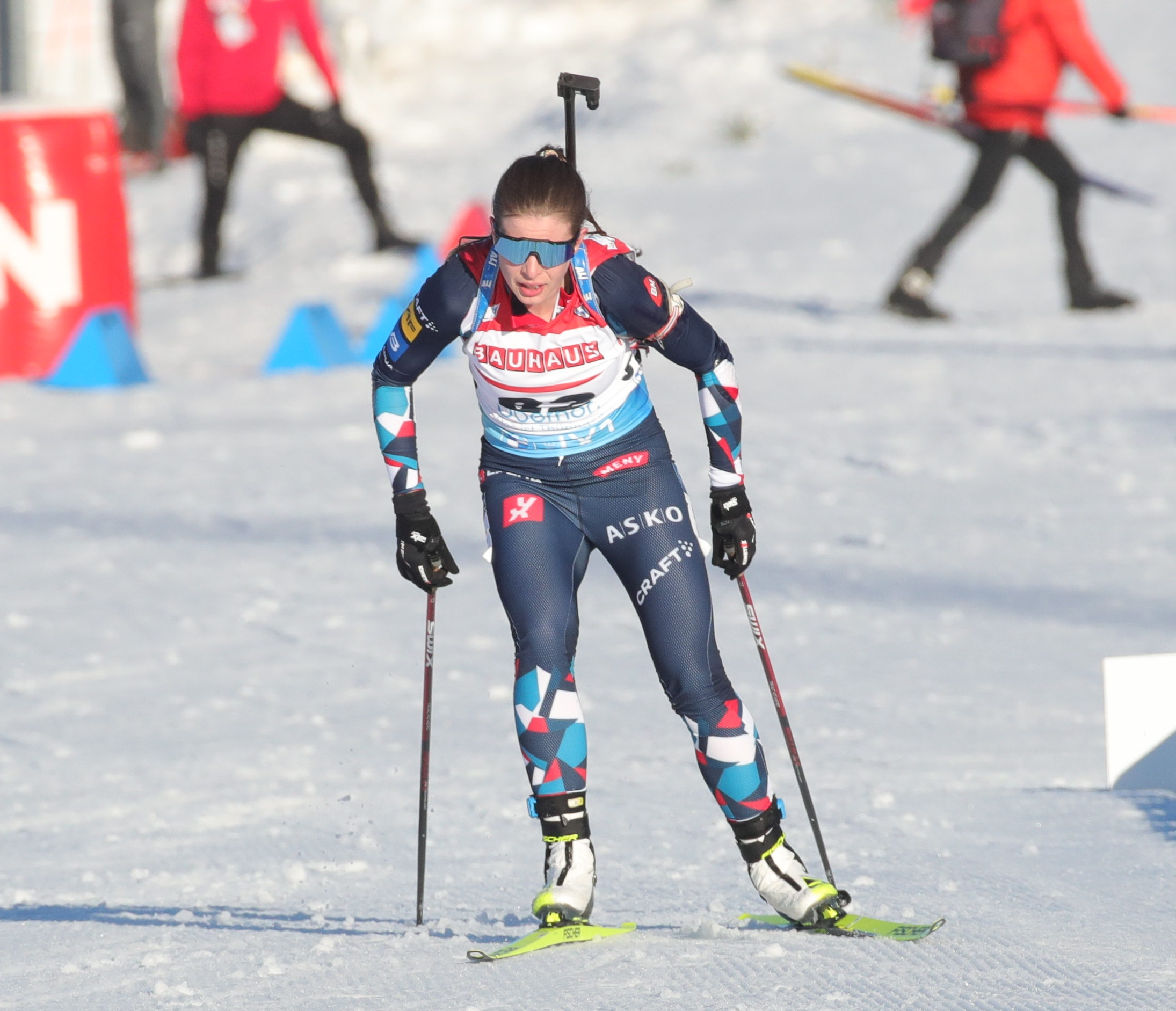
Lien at the 2023 World Championships in Oberhof

During the 2022/23 winter season, Lien achieved just one result in the Top Ten. Due to several shooting errors, she missed points in several races but remained part of the national team. At the World Championships in Oberhof, her best result was 17th place in the individual event, while the relay team finished sixth after a total of four penalty loops by Lien and Ingrid Landmark Tandrevold. At the end of the season, she celebrated her fifth victory with the women’s relay in Östersund. Together with Frida Dokken and Tuva Aas Stræte, she also won the Norwegian national title in the relay event. In preparation for the following season, Lien struggled with back issues throughout the second half of the year and missed almost the entire month of December. She returned to competition with the IBU Cup races in Sjusjøen, where she immediately achieved two podium finishes. After more strong results in Ridnaun, Lien made her World Cup comeback in Antholz, where she impressed with a strong performance and a ninth-place finish in the shortened individual race. She then competed at the 2024 European Championships in Osrblie, where she became the European champion in both the sprint and the mixed relay, thanks to flawless shooting in both events. Despite a significant improvement in her back pain during the summer period, she, like the other members of the elite team, arrives in a relative poor form for the selection races in Sjusjøen in mid-November. Far from her usual performance on skis and too imprecise at the shooting range, she finishes 38th in the sprint and 14th in the mass start, and sees Maren Kirkeeide, Emilie Kalkenberg, and Gro Randby chosen to start the season in the World Cup. However, just fifteen days later, she manages to achieve a promising sprint-pursuit double victory in the IBU Cup at the first stage in Idre Fjäll.

== Biathlon results ==
=== Olympic Games ===
0 medal

| Event | Individual | Sprint | Pursuit | Mass start | Relay | Mixed relay |
|---|---|---|---|---|---|---|
| (China) 2022 Beijing | — | 38th | 33rd | — | 4th | — |

=== World Championships ===
1 medal (1 gold)

| Event | Individual | Sprint | Pursuit | Mass start | Relay | Mixed relay | Single mixed relay |
|---|---|---|---|---|---|---|---|
| (Slovenia) 2021 Pokljuka | 11th | 17th | 17th | 24th | Gold | — | — |
| (Germany) 2023 Oberhof | 17th | 42nd | 36th | — | 6th | — | — |
| (Czech Republic) 2024 Nové Město | 77th | 22nd | 30th | — | 10th | — | — |
| (Switzerland) 2025 Lenzerheide | 35th | — | — | — | — | — | — |

=== World Cup ===
==== Overall standings ====
| Season | Age | Overall | | | Individual | | Sprint | | Pursuit | | Mass start | |
| Season | Age | Races | Points | Position | Points | Position | Points | Position | Points | Position | Points | Position |
|---|---|---|---|---|---|---|---|---|---|---|---|---|
| 2019–20 | 22 | 2/21 | Didn't earn World Cup points | | | | | | | | | |
| 2020–21 | 23 | 19/26 | 276 | 29th | 41 | 26th | 134 | 22nd | 87 | 30th | 14 | 45th |
| 2021–22 | 24 | 17/22 | 187 | 36th | — | — | 144 | 21st | 29 | 49th | 14 | 45th |
| 2022–23 | 25 | 12/20 | 117 | 40th | — | — | 80 | 30th | 37 | 43rd | — | — |
| 2023–24 | 26 | 8/21 | 167 | 36th | 92 | 9th | 11 | 69th | 34 | 45th | 30 | 32nd |
| 2024–25 | 27 | 15/21 | 310 | 24th | 30 | 35th | 107 | 25th | 94 | 27th | 79 | 23rd |

==== Individual podiums ====
- 1 podium

| No. | Season | Date | Location | Level | Race | Place |
|---|---|---|---|---|---|---|
| 1 | 2023–24 | 1 March 2024 | (Norway) Oslo Holmenkollen | World Cup | Individual | 3rd |

==== Team podiums ====
- 6 victories
- 9 podiums

| No. | Season | Date | Location | Level | Race | Place | Teammate(s) |
|---|---|---|---|---|---|---|---|
| 1 | 2019–20 | 7 March 2020 | (Czech Republic) Nové Město | World Cup | Relay | 1st | Knotten, Tandrevold, Eckhoff |
| 2 | 2020–21 | 20 February 2021 | (Slovenia) Pokljuka | World Cup | Relay | 1st | Tandrevold, Eckhoff, Røiseland |
| 3 | 2021–22 | 22 January 2022 | (Italy) Antholz-Anterselva | World Cup | Relay | 1st | Knotten, Eckhoff, Tandrevold |
| 4 | 2021–22 | 3 March 2022 | (Finland) Kontiolahti | World Cup | Relay | 1st | Røiseland, Eckhoff, Tandrevold |
| 5 | 2022–23 | 1 December 2022 | (Finland) Kontiolahti | World Cup | Relay | 3rd | Knotten, Femsteinevik, Tandrevold |
| 6 | 2022–23 | 11 March 2023 | (Sweden) Östersund | World Cup | Relay | 1st | Arnekleiv, Tandrevold, Røiseland |
| 7 | 2023–24 | 3 March 2024 | (Norway) Oslo Holmenkollen | World Cup | Mixed Relay | 3rd | Tandrevold, T. Bø, J.T. Bø |
| 8 | 2023–24 | 9 March 2024 | (United States) Soldier Hollow | World Cup | Relay | 1st | Arnekleiv, Knotten, Tandrevold |
| 9 | 2024–25 | 16 March 2025 | (Slovenia) Pokljuka | World Cup | Mixed Relay | 3rd | Kirkeeide, Dale-Skjevdal, Frey |
