= 2008–09 Biathlon IBU Cup =

International biathlon competition

The 2008–09 Biathlon IBU Cup was a multi-race tournament over a season of biathlon, organised by the International Biathlon Union. The season started on 29 November 2008 in Idre, Sweden, and ended on 14 March 2009 in Ridnaun-Val Ridanna, Italy.

== Calendar ==
Below is the World Cup calendar for the 2008–09 season.

Stage	Location	Date	Individual	Sprint	Pursuit	Relay	Details
1	(Sweden) Idre	29–30 November		● ●			Stage 1
2	(Austria) Obertilliach	13–14 December	●	●			Stage 2
3	(Italy) Martell-Val Martello	19–20 December		●	●		Stage 3
4	(Germany) Altenberg	10–11 January	●	●			Stage 4
5	(Czech Republic) Nove Mesto	16–17 January		●	●		Stage 5
6	(Slovakia) Brezno-Osrblie	7–8 February	●	●			Stage 6
7	(Bulgaria) Bansko	12–14 February		●	●		Stage 7
EC	(Russia) Ufa	28 February–4 March	●	●	●	●	European Championships
8	(Italy) Ridnaun-Val Ridanna	11–14 March	●	●	●		Stage 8
Total			5	9	5	1	

== Standings (men) ==
=== Overall ===
Rank	Name	Points
1	Christoph Knie (GER)	457
2	Hans Martin Gjedrem (NOR)	436
3	Carsten Pump (GER)	384

=== Individual ===
Rank	Name	Points
1	Norbert Schiller (GER)	145
2	Hans Martin Gjedrem (NOR)	108
2	Frode Andresen (NOR)	108

=== Sprint ===
Rank	Name	Points
1	Hans Martin Gjedrem (NOR)	268
2	Christoph Knie (GER)	245
3	Rune Brattsveen (NOR)	233

=== Pursuit ===
Rank	Name	Points
1	Alexander Nuss (AUT)	101
2	Robert Wick (GER)	95
3	Andrei Prokunin (RUS)	94

=== Relay ===
Rank	Name	Points
1	Norway	60
2	Germany	54
3	Russia	48
