= Lucas Fratzscher =

German biathlete (born 1994)

- Fratzscher in 2026

Personal information
- Nationality: German
- Born: 6 July 1994 (age 32) Suhl, Germany

Sport
- Country: Germany
- Sport: Biathlon
Medal record
Men's biathlon
Representing Germany
European Championships
Silver medal – second place	2019 Minsk	Mixed relay
Silver medal – second place	2022 Arber	Mixed relay
Silver medal – second place	2023 Lenzerheide	Mixed relay
Silver medal – second place	2025 Val Martello	4 × 7.5 km relay
Bronze medal – third place	2022 Arber	Sprint
Bronze medal – third place	2022 Arber	Pursuit
- Updated on 21 April 2024

Lucas Fratzscher (born 6 July 1994) is a German biathlete. He is the winner of the overall IBU Cup standings for the 2019/20 season.

== Career ==
Lucas Fratzscher grew up in Schleusingen. After initially practicing athletics, he started biathlon at the age of nine at WSV Oberhof 05. In 2007, he attended the Sports High School Oberhof, where he graduated in 2014. Since then, he has been a member of the sports promotion group of the Bundeswehr in the Rennsteig Barracks and is coached by Mark Kirchner and Marko Danz at the Thuringian Olympic Training Center in Oberhof.

Lucas Fratzscher competed in his first international races during the IBU Cup 2016/17 in Obertilliach. In the same winter, he also participated in the Biathlon European Championships, with a 13th place in the sprint in Martell being his best result of the season. In the following season, he couldn't improve this result. At the European Championships in Ridnaun, he once again missed out on the medal positions by a considerable margin.

=== Season 2018/19 - First international successes and World Cup debut ===
At the German Championships in 2018, Fratzscher secured his first international starting position for the season with three fourth places. Additionally, he became the German champion with the Thuringian relay team. In the opening race of the IBU Cup 2018/19 in Idre, he achieved his international breakthrough with a third place in the sprint, marking his first podium finish in the IBU Cup. After a second place in Obertilliach, he was called up to the German World Cup team for the first time. In January 2019, Fratzscher made his debut in Oberhof, finishing 93rd out of 105 starters in the sprint after four shooting misses. Upon returning to the IBU Cup, he secured another second place. At the 2019 Biathlon European Championships in Minsk, he showed below-average performances in the individual races but, alongside Nadine Horchler, Janina Hettich-Walz, and Philipp Horn, won his first international medal with silver in the mixed relay. In the remaining IBU Cup season, he won his first individual race in Martell, achieving a German sweep in the sprint ahead of Philipp Horn and Danilo Riethmüller, and narrowly secured second place in the overall standings with a one-point lead over Aristide Bègue, thanks to several other top-10 finishes. As a result, he qualified for further World Cup appearances at the season finale in Oslo in March 2019. These races went significantly better than in Oberhof: he qualified for the mass start, achieved points in all three races, and secured two top-10 placements.

=== Season 2019/20 - IBU Cup Overall Victory ===
At the German Championships in 2019, the Thuringian relay, including Fratzscher, repeated their success from the previous year. In the first race of the IBU Cup 2019/20 season, he secured his second career victory in the sprint in Sjusjøen. He also reached the podium in the two subsequent races there. At the next IBU Cup stop in Obertilliach, he finished second in the short individual race and won the single mixed relay together with Stefanie Scherer. Fratzscher entered the Christmas break as the clear leader in the overall standings and, like the previous year, was nominated for the World Cup in Oberhof in January, where he finished 86th with four shooting misses. Upon returning to the IBU Cup, he finished second with the German mixed relay in Osrblie. In February in Martell, he achieved three more individual podium finishes and two additional top-10 placements. The European Championships 2020, which were once again moved to Minsk at short notice, did not go as well for Fratzscher, as he failed to win any medals. However, at the subsequent IBU Cup finale at the same venue, he achieved results within the top ten in both sprints. With a 13th place in the final mass start, he defended his lead in the overall standings with just one point ahead of Endre Strømsheim and secured the big crystal globe. Additionally, he won the sprint standings. Consequently, he was nominated for the World Cup in Kontiolahti, where he failed to score points in both the sprint and pursuit. The subsequent season finale in Oslo was canceled due to the COVID-19 pandemic.

== Biathlon results ==
All results are sourced from the International Biathlon Union.

=== World Cup ===
Season	Overall			Individual		Sprint		Pursuit		Mass start	
Season	Races	Points	Position	Points	Position	Points	Position	Points	Position	Points	Position
2018–19	4/25	64	56th	—	—	10	78th	26	52nd	28	36th
2019–20	3/21	Didn't earn World Cup points									
2020–21	5/26	1	101st	—	—	—	—	1	80th	—	—
2021–22	5/22	34	77th	—	—	19	72nd	15	64th	—	—
2022–23	2/21	34	63nd	—	—	14	61st	20	54th	—	—

=== European Championships ===
5 medals (3 silver, 2 bronze)

Year	Individual	Sprint	Pursuit	Mixed Relay
(Poland) 2017 Duszniki Zdroj	33rd	48th	54th	—
(Italy) 2018 Ridnaun	35th	50th	42nd	—
(Belarus) 2019 Minsk	40th	38th	24th	Silver
(Belarus) 2020 Minsk	—	10th	37th	13th
(Germany) 2022 Arber	33rd	Bronze	Bronze	Silver
(Switzerland) 2023 Lenzerheide	—	7th	11th	Silver
(Slovakia) 2024 Brezno-Osrblie	42nd	21st	34th	—
