= 2020 IBU Open European Championships =

International biathlon competition

The 27th IBU Open European Championships were held in Raubichi, Belarus from 26 February to 1 March 2020. It was also a stage of the 2019–20 Biathlon IBU Cup.

== Schedule ==
All times are local (UTC+3).

Date	Time	Event
26 February	13:00	Men's super sprint qualification
26 February	15:00	Women's super sprint qualification
26 February	17:30	Men's super sprint final
26 February	18:00	Women's super sprint final
27 February	14:00	6 km W + 7.5 km M single mixed relay
27 February	17:00	2 × 6 km W + 2 × 6 km M mixed relay
29 February	12:30	Men's 10 km sprint
29 February	15:30	Women's 7.5 km sprint
1 March	12:30	Men's 12.5 km pursuit
1 March	14:30	Women's 10 km pursuit

== Results ==
=== Men ===
Event	Gold		Silver		Bronze	
Super sprint details	Sergey Bocharnikov; Belarus	14:12.8 (0+1 0+0 0+1 0+0)	Adam Václavík; Czech Republic	14:13.2 (0+0 0+1 0+1 0+1)	Dmytro Pidruchnyi; Ukraine	14:13.3 (0+0 0+0 1+1 0+1)
10 km sprint details	Matvey Eliseev; Russia	23:46.4 (1+0)	Andrejs Rastorgujevs; Latvia	23:50.5 (0+1)	Aleksander Fjeld Andersen; Norway	24:11.9 (0+1)
12.5 km pursuit details	Sergey Bocharnikov; Belarus	35:03.9 (0+0+0+2)	Sturla Holm Lægreid; Norway	35:10.6 (1+0+0+1)	Sivert Guttorm Bakken; Norway	35:27.8 (0+0+1+1)

=== Women ===
Event	Gold		Silver		Bronze	
Super sprint details	Evgeniya Pavlova; Russia	16:31.8 (0+0 0+0 0+0 0+0)	Olena Pidhrushna; Ukraine	16:34.6 (0+0 0+0 0+1 0+0)	Chloé Chevalier; France	16:37.3 (0+1 0+0 0+0 0+0)
7.5 km sprint details	Elisabeth Högberg; Sweden	22:39.6 (1+0)	Ida Lien; Norway	22:54.0 (0+0)	Iryna Kryuko; Belarus	22:55.5 (0+1)
10 km pursuit details	Elena Kruchinkina; Belarus	29:21.1 (0+0+0+0)	Kristina Reztsova; Russia	29:38.7 (1+0+0+1)	Elisabeth Högberg; Sweden	29:56.2 (0+1+0+2)

=== Mixed ===
Event	Gold		Silver		Bronze	
6 km W + 7.5 km M single relay details	Norway; Karoline Erdal; Endre Strømsheim; Karoline Erdal; Endre Strømsheim	47:12.2 (0+1) (0+2) (0+3) (0+1) (0+2) (0+0) (0+3) (0+0)	Germany; Stefanie Scherer; Justus Strelow; Stefanie Scherer; Justus Strelow	47:23.7 (0+2) (0+0) (0+1) (0+1) (0+0) (0+0) (0+1) (0+0)	Ukraine; Anastasiya Merkushyna; Ruslan Tkalenko; Anastasiya Merkushyna; Ruslan Tkalenko	47:24.0 (0+0) (0+1) (0+1) (0+0) (0+0) (0+2) (0+2) (0+1)
4 × 6 km W+M relay details	Ukraine; Valentyna Semerenko; Yuliia Dzhima; Artem Pryma; Dmytro Pidruchnyi	1:11:32.1 (0+2) (0+1) (0+1) (0+0) (0+1) (0+2) (0+2) (0+0)	Russia; Kristina Reztsova; Victoria Slivko; Eduard Latypov; Said Karimulla Khalili	1:12:04.3 (0+3) (0+1) (0+1) (0+2) (0+1) (0+0) (0+0) (0+1)	Norway; Åsne Skrede; Ida Lien; Sivert Guttorm Bakken; Aleksander Fjeld Andersen	1:12:05.8 (0+1) (0+1) (0+0) (0+0) (0+0) (0+0) (0+0) (0+1)

== Medal table ==
* Host nation (Belarus)

Rank	Nation	Gold	Silver	Bronze	Total
1	Belarus*	3	0	1	4
2	Russia	2	2	0	4
3	Norway	1	2	3	6
4	Ukraine	1	1	2	4
5	Sweden	1	0	1	2
6	Czech Republic	0	1	0	1
6	Germany	0	1	0	1
6	Latvia	0	1	0	1
9	France	0	0	1	1
Totals (9 entries)		8	8	8	24
