= 2019 IBU Open European Championships =

Biathlon competition in Raubichi, Belarus

The 26th IBU Open European Championships were held in Raubichi, Belarus from 20 to 24 February 2019. It was also a stage of the 2018–19 Biathlon IBU Cup.

There were a total of eight competitions held: Single Mixed Relay, Relay Mixed, Sprint Women, Sprint Men, Pursuit Women, Pursuit Men, Individual Women and Individual Men.

== Schedule ==
All times are local (UTC+3).

Date	Time	Event
20 February	16:00	Individual Men
20 February	19:30	Individual Women
21 February	16:00	Single Mixed Relay
21 February	19:00	Mixed Relay
23 February	11:00	Sprint Men
23 February	14:00	Sprint Women
24 February	11:00	Pursuit Men
24 February	13:00	Pursuit Women

== Results ==
=== Men's ===
Event	Gold		Silver		Bronze	
Men's 20 km individual details	Krasimir Anev; Bulgaria	53:18.1 (0+1+0+0)	Tarjei Bø; Norway	53:21.8 (0+0+1+2)	Endre Strømsheim; Norway	53:29.2 (0+1+0+1)
Men's 10 km sprint details	Tarjei Bø; Norway	21:40.1 (1+0)	Jesper Nelin; Sweden	21:50.7 (0+0)	Dmitry Malyshko; Russia	22:15.3 (0+0)
Men's 12.5 km pursuit details	Tarjei Bø; Norway	31:10.3 (0+0+0+1)	Matvey Eliseev; Russia	31:38.8 (0+1+0+0)	Håvard Bogetveit; Norway	32:04.5 (0+0+1+0)

=== Women's ===
Event	Gold		Silver		Bronze	
Women's 15 km individual details	Hanna Öberg; Sweden	48:13.1 (0+1+1+1)	Yuliya Zhuravok; Ukraine	48:45.4 (0+1+0+0)	Iryna Kryuko; Belarus	48:54.6 (0+0+1+1)
Women's 7.5 km sprint details	Mona Brorsson; Sweden	19:37.4 (0+0)	Ekaterina Yurlova-Percht; Russia	20:14.9 (0+1)	Hanna Öberg; Sweden	20:23.0 (0+2)
Women's 10 km pursuit details	Ekaterina Yurlova-Percht; Russia	27:43.4 (0+0+0+1)	Iryna Kryuko; Belarus	28:20.9 (0+1+0+0)	Nadine Horchler; Germany	28:32.8 (0+0+1+0)

=== Mixed ===
Event	Gold		Silver		Bronze	
Single mixed relay details	Russia; Evgeniya Pavlova; Dmitry Malyshko; Evgeniya Pavlova; Dmitry Malyshko	36:30.0 (0+2) (0+0) (0+0) (0+0) (1+3) (0+0) (0+1) (0+3)	Sweden; Anna Magnusson; Jesper Nelin; Anna Magnusson; Jesper Nelin	36:50.6 (0+0) (0+0) (0+0) (0+0) (0+2) (0+1) (0+2) (0+1)	France; Lou Jeanmonnot; Aristide Bègue; Lou Jeanmonnot; Aristide Bègue	36:59.0 (0+1) (0+1) (0+0) (0+0) (0+1) (0+0) (0+3) (0+0)
Mixed relay details	Sweden; Emma Nilsson; Mona Brorsson; Martin Ponsiluoma; Sebastian Samuelsson	1:05:16.0 (0+0) (0+2) (0+1) (0+0) (0+2) (0+2) (0+1) (0+0)	Germany; Nadine Horchler; Janina Hettich; Lucas Fratzscher; Philipp Horn	1:05:33.7 (0+2) (0+1) (0+0) (0+2) (0+0) (0+1) (0+0) (0+0)	Belarus; Dzinara Alimbekava; Hanna Sola; Raman Yaliotnau; Sergey Bocharnikov	1:05:45.8 (0+1) (0+0) (0+0) (0+0) (0+1) (0+2) (0+0) (0+2)

== Medal table ==
* Host nation (Belarus)

Rank	Nation	Gold	Silver	Bronze	Total
1	Sweden (SWE)	3	2	1	6
2	Russia (RUS)	2	2	1	5
3	Norway (NOR)	2	1	2	5
4	Bulgaria (BUL)	1	0	0	1
5	Belarus (BLR)*	0	1	2	3
6	Germany (GER)	0	1	1	2
7	Ukraine (UKR)	0	1	0	1
8	France (FRA)	0	0	1	1
Totals (8 entries)		8	8	8	24
