= Jädraås =

- Location within Sweden Gävleborg Location within Sweden
- Coordinates: 60°51′N 16°28′E
- Country: Sweden
- Province: Gästrikland
- County: Gävleborg County
- Municipality: Ockelbo Municipality

Area
  - Total: 0.75 km^{2} (0.29 sq mi)

Population (31 December 2010)
  - Total: 220
  - Density: 293/km^{2} (760/sq mi)
- Time zone: UTC+1 (CET)
  - Summer (DST): UTC+2 (CEST)

Jädraås (Swedish pronunciation: [ˈjɛ̂ːdraˌoːs]) is a locality situated in Ockelbo Municipality, Gävleborg County, Sweden with a population of 220 in 2010.
