= Karoline Erdal =

Norwegian biathlete (born 1997)

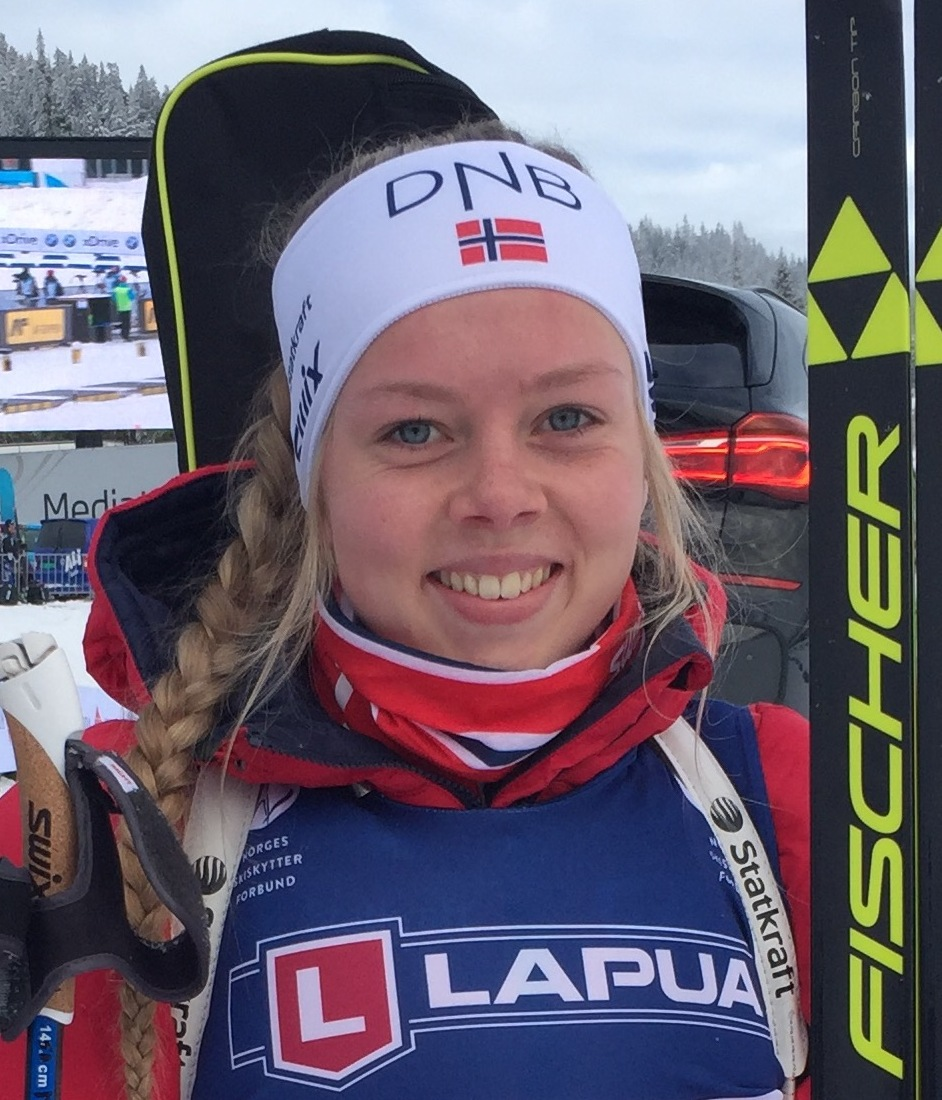
- Erdal in 2016

Personal information
- Nationality: Norwegian
- Born: 15 November 1997 (age 28) Førde, Norway

Sport
- Country: Norway
- Sport: Biathlon
Medal record
Women's biathlon
Representing Norway
European Championships
Gold medal – first place	2020 Minsk	Single Mixed relay
Gold medal – first place	2023 Lenzerheide	Mixed relay
Silver medal – second place	2017 Duszniki Zdroj	Mixed relay
Silver medal – second place	2021 Duszniki Zdroj	Sprint
Silver medal – second place	2021 Duszniki Zdroj	Pursuit
Junior World Championships
Gold medal – first place	2017 Brezno-Osrblie	3 × 6 km Relay
Youth World Championships
Gold medal – first place	2016 Cheile Grădiştei	Sprint
Bronze medal – third place	2016 Cheile Grădiştei	3 × 6 km Relay
- Updated on 30 March 2025

Karoline Erdal (born 15 November 1997) is a Norwegian biathlete. Two-time junior biathlon world champion and two-time European biathlon champion. Made her debut in the World Cup in 2016. Achieved victory in 13 races at the IBU Cup.

== Career ==
Erdal made her debut in the World Cup during the 2016/17 season at the stage in Ostersund, finishing 82nd in the individual race.

The Norwegian athlete has numerous victories in races at the IBU Cup stages. In 2020, she, along with Endre Strømsheim, won the European Championship in the single mixed relay.

In 2021, Erdal secured two individual silver medals at the European Championship in Duszniki-Zdrój, in the sprint and pursuit races.

== Biathlon results ==
All results are sourced from the International Biathlon Union.

=== World Cup ===
Season	Age	Overall			Individual		Sprint		Pursuit		Mass start	
Season	Age	Races	Points	Position	Points	Position	Points	Position	Points	Position	Points	Position
2016–17	19	3/26	Did not earn World Cup points									
2019–20	22	1/21	Did not earn World Cup points									
2020–21	23	3/26	2	94th	—	—	—	—	2	78th	—	—
2021–22	24	8/22	61	59th	7	58th	26	59th	28	51st	—	—
2022–23	25	6/20	22	71st	—	—	22	60th	—	—	—	—
2023–24	26	5/21	54	61st	—	—	18	58th	15	61st	21	37th
2024–25	27	3/21	60	63rd	—	—	27	57th	11	63rd	22	44th
