= Stefanie Scherer =

German biathlete (born 1996)

Personal information
- Nationality: German
- Born: 13 May 1996 (age 30)

Sport
- Country: Germany
- Sport: Biathlon
Medal record
Women's biathlon
Representing Germany
European Championships
Gold medal – first place	2021 Duszniki-Zdrój	Single mixed relay
Gold medal – first place	2025 Val Martello	4 × 6 km relay
Silver medal – second place	2020 Raubichi	Single mixed relay
- Updated on 19 January 2025

Stefanie Scherer (born 13 May 1996) is a German biathlete. She made her debut in the Biathlon World Cup in 2020.

== Career ==
Stefanie Scherer started her athletic career in cross-country skiing, winning silver in the team event at the 2012 OPA Nordic Ski Games. She switched to biathlon the same year. In the 2014/15 and 2015/16 seasons, she placed 12th and 5th in her age group in Germany's Deutschlandpokal national cup. In 2016, Scherer joined the German Ski Association's development team and debuted internationally at the 2017 Junior European Championships, where she struggled to compete. She later placed third in the national junior rankings. Scherer moved to the senior level in 2017/18, winning bronze in the relay at the German Championships. Competing primarily in Germany's Deutschlandpokal national cup, she secured five podiums and finished second overall but did not receive international race assignments.

In 2018/19, Scherer debuted in the IBU Cup after strong national performances. She earned her first IBU Cup podium in March 2019 and placed 4th overall in the 2019/20 season, highlighted by two wins and silver in the single mixed relay at the European Championships. In March 2020, she made her World Cup debut but missed qualifying for the pursuit race. In 2020/21, her performance dipped, but she won gold in the single mixed relay at the European Championships and placed 28th in the overall IBU Cup standings. Scherer failed to qualify for international competitions in 2021/22 and 2022/23. She dominated the German Deutschlandpokal both seasons, winning multiple races and the overall title, but was not selected for the IBU Cup. She also lost her spot in the national team in 2022. In 2023/24, Scherer rejoined the German Ski Association's development team. After strong national results, she returned to the IBU Cup in January 2024, earning several top-10 finishes and a podium at the European Championships. She won her first IBU Cup race in three years in March 2024.

Promoted to the German B-team, Scherer began the season with solid performances in the IBU Cup, including a mass start win and a podium in the single mixed relay. Her consistency earned her a World Cup nomination in Ruhpolding, where she placed 23rd in the individual race and contributed to Germany's relay victory—her first World Cup win.

== Biathlon results ==
All results are sourced from the International Biathlon Union.

=== World Cup ===
Season	Overall			Individual		Sprint		Pursuit		Mass start	
Season	Races	Points	Position	Points	Position	Points	Position	Points	Position	Points	Position
2019–20	1/21	Did not earn World Cup points									

==== Relay podiums ====
No.	Season	Date	Location	Level	Teammates
1	2024–25	18 January 2025	(Germany) Ruhpolding	Biathlon World Cup	Grotian, Schneider, Preuß
