= Evgeniya Burtasova =

Russian biathlete

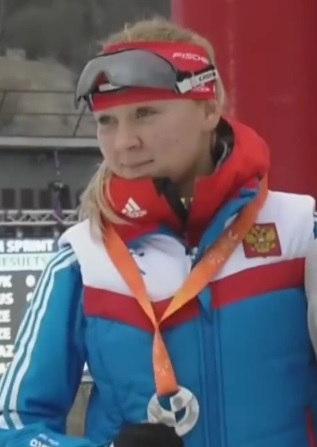

Personal information
- Nationality: Russian
- Born: 9 July 1993 (age 33) Guryevsk, Kemerovo Oblast

Sport

Professional information
- Sport: Biathlon
- World Cup debut: 6 December 2018

World Championships
- Teams: 2 (2019, 2021)

World Cup
- Seasons: 3 (2018/19–)
- Individual victories: 0
- All victories: 2
- Individual podiums: 0
- All podiums: 2
Medal record
European Championships
Gold medal – first place	2019 Raubichi	Single mixed relay
Gold medal – first place	2020 Raubichi	Super sprint
Gold medal – first place	2022 Arber	15 km individual
Gold medal – first place	2022 Arber	Single mixed relay
Winter Universiade
Gold medal – first place	2015 Osrblie	10 km pursuit
Gold medal – first place	2015 Osrblie	Mixed relay
Silver medal – second place	2015 Osrblie	7.5 km sprint
Junior World Championships
Gold medal – first place	2014 Presque Isle	7.5 km sprint
Silver medal – second place	2014 Presque Isle	3 × 6 km relay

Evgeniya Alexandrovna Burtasova (née Pavlova, Russian: Евгения Александровна Буртасова (Павлова); born 9 July 1993) is a Russian biathlete. She has competed in the Biathlon World Cup since 2018, and represented Russia at the Biathlon World Championships 2021.

== Biathlon results ==
All results are sourced from the International Biathlon Union.

=== Olympic Games ===
Event	Individual	Sprint	Pursuit	Mass start	Relay	Mixed relay
Representing ROC Russian Olympic Committee
(China) 2022 Beijing	77th	—	—	—	—	―

=== World Championships ===
0 medals

Event	Individual	Sprint	Pursuit	Mass start	Relay	Mixed relay	Single mixed relay
Representing Russia
(Sweden) 2019 Östersund	—	24th	9th	18th	5th	4th	6th
Representing Russian Biathlon Union
(Slovenia) 2021 Pokljuka	—	51st	40th	—	11th	—	11th
