= Giuseppe Montello =

Italian biathlete (born 1992)

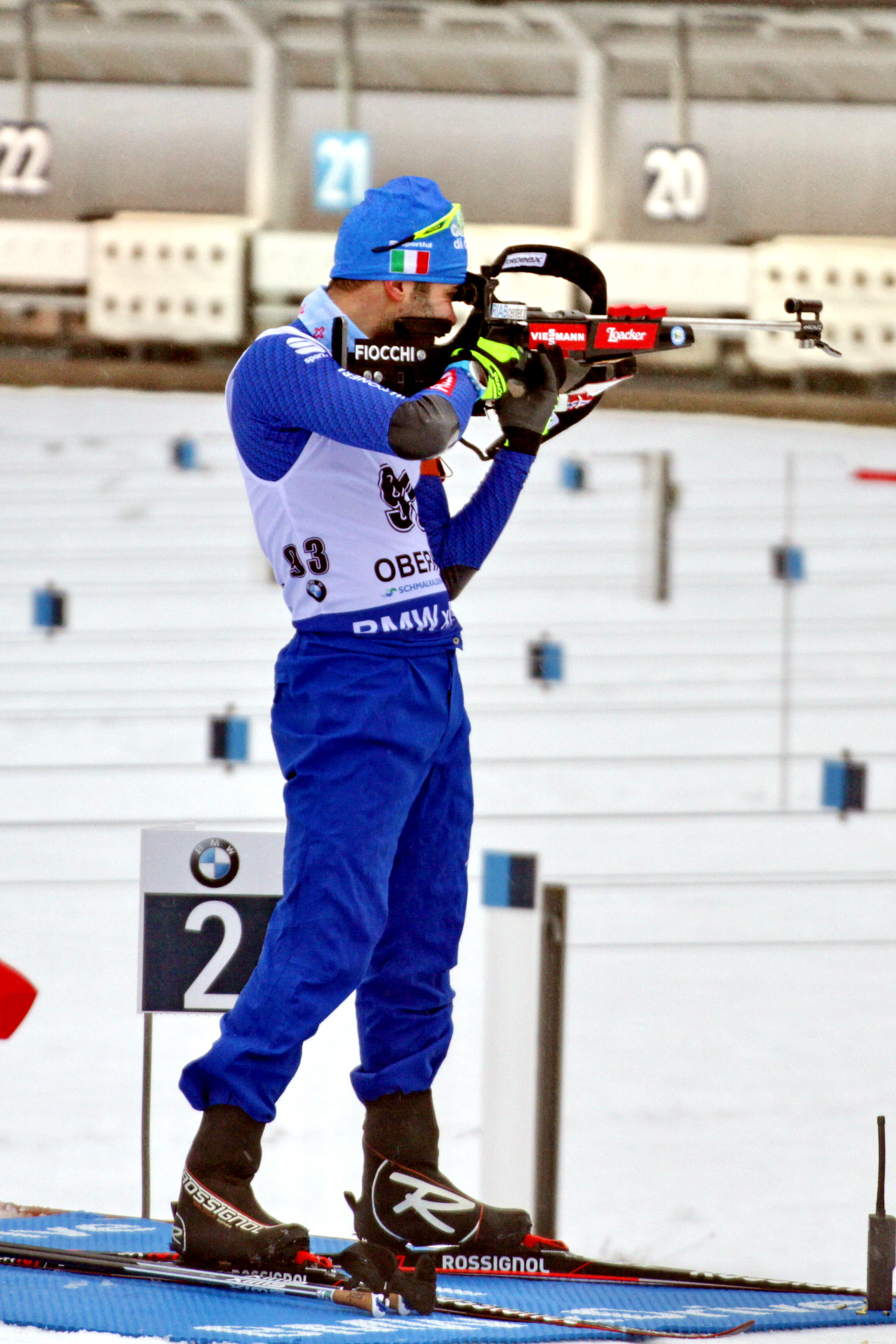
- Montello in Oberhof in 2018

Personal information
- Nationality: Italian
- Born: 7 December 1992 (age 32); Tolmezzo, Italy

Sport
- Sport: Biathlon

Giuseppe Montello (born 7 December 1992) is an Italian biathlete. He competed in the 2018 Winter Olympics.

== Biathlon results ==
All results are sourced from the International Biathlon Union.

=== Olympic Games ===
0 medals

Event	Individual	Sprint	Pursuit	Mass start	Relay	Mixed relay
(South Korea) 2018 Pyeongchang	40th	50th	39th	-		-

=== World Championships ===
0 medals

Event	Individual	Sprint	Pursuit	Mass start	Relay	Mixed relay
(Austria) 2017 Hochfilzen	87th	44th	34th	-	5th	-
(Sweden) 2019 Östersund	-	75th	-	-	15th	-

*During Olympic seasons competitions are only held for those events not included in the Olympic program.
