= Elisabeth Högberg =

Swedish biathlete

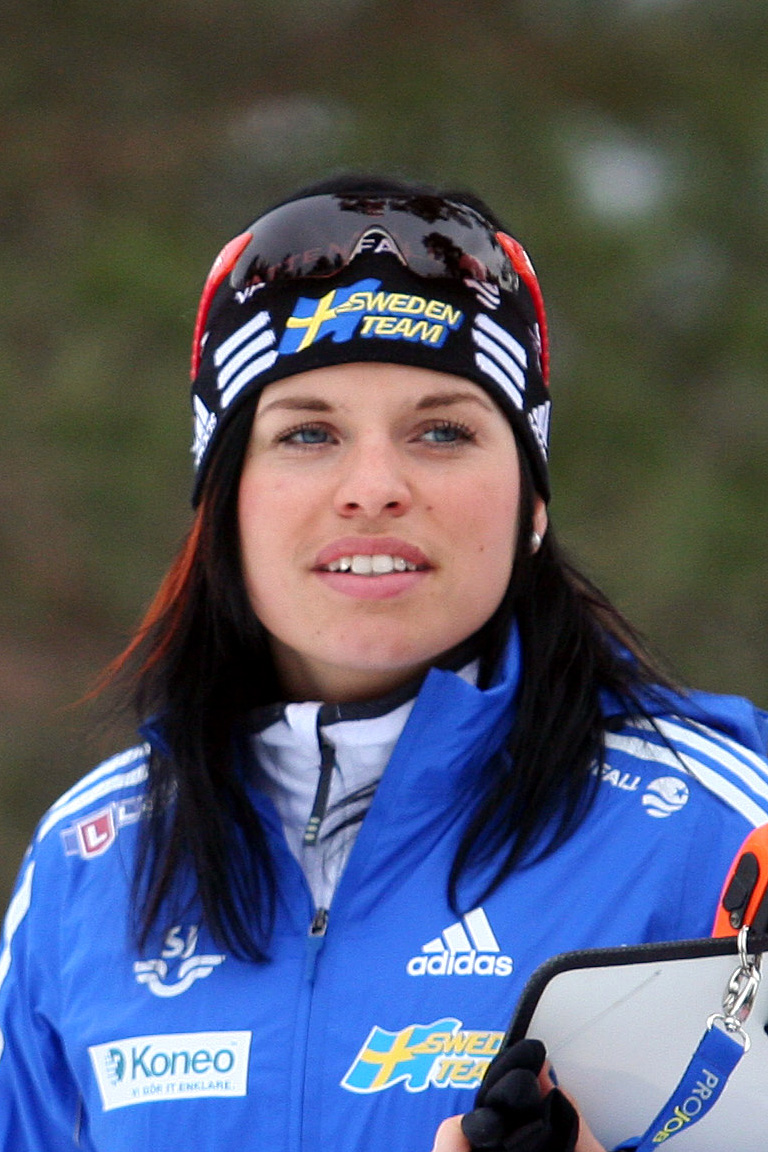
- Elisabeth Högberg in Oslo in March 2010

Personal information
- Nationality: Swedish
- Born: 7 November 1986 (age 39) Jädraås, Sweden

Sport
Medal record
Representing Sweden
European Championships
Gold medal – first place	2020 Raubichi	7.5 km sprint
Bronze medal – third place	2020 Raubichi	10 km pursuit

Elisabeth Högberg (born in Jädraås on November 7, 1986) is a former Swedish biathlete. She was on the gold-winning Swedish team at the 2009–10 Biathlon World Cup – World Cup 5. She resides in Östersund and considered soccer before trying on Biathlon. She competed for Sweden at the 2010 Winter Olympics. She went to the Sollefteå Ski High School.

During the 2019–2020 season, she won the IBU Cup.

== Summer biathlon ==
In August 2019, she became Swedish champion at the 7,5 kilometres sprint distance during the Swedish national summer biathlon championships in Sollefteå.

== Biathlon results ==
All results are sourced from the International Biathlon Union.

=== Olympic Games ===
0 medals

Event	Individual	Sprint	Pursuit	Mass start	Relay	Mixed relay
(Canada) 2010 Vancouver	76th	—	—	—	5th	—
(South Korea) 2018 Pyeongchang	—	35th	29th	—	—	—

:*The mixed relay was added as an event in 2014.

=== World Championships ===
0 medals

Event	Individual	Sprint	Pursuit	Mass start	Relay	Mixed relay
(Sweden) 2008 Östersund	36th	—	—	—	8th	—
(South Korea) 2009 Pyeongchang	—	91st	—	—	—	—
(Germany) 2012 Ruhpolding	73rd	—	—	—	—	—
(Czech Republic) 2013 Nové Město	21st	44th	56th	—	15th	14th
(Finland) 2015 Kontiolahti	81st	50th	44th	—	8th	16th

*During Olympic seasons competitions are only held for those events not included in the Olympic program.
