= Iryna Leshchanka =

Belarusian biathlete (born 1991)

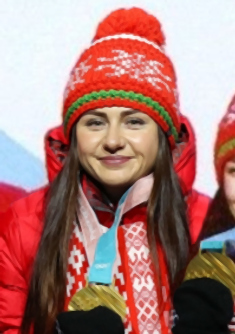
- Leshchanka at the 2018 Olympics

Personal information
- Born: 30 July 1991 (age 34) Syanno, Soviet Union
- Height: 160 cm (5 ft 3 in)

Sport
- Coached by: Vasili Leshchenko

Professional information
- Sport: Biathlon

Olympic Games
- Teams: 1 (2018)
- Medals: 1 (1 gold)

World Championships
- Teams: 4 (2015, 2016, 2017, 2019)
Medal record
Representing Belarus
Olympic Games
Gold medal – first place	2018 Pyeongchang	4 × 6 km relay
Junior World Championships
Bronze medal – third place	2012 Kontiolahti	10 km pursuit
Youth World Championships
Silver medal – second place	2009 Canmore	3 × 6 km relay
Bronze medal – third place	2010 Torsby	3 × 6 km relay
European Championships
Gold medal – first place	2014 Nové Město	4 x 6 km relay
Silver medal – second place	2019 Raubichi	10 km pursuit
Bronze medal – third place	2014 Nové Město	15 km individual
Bronze medal – third place	2019 Raubichi	15 km individual
Bronze medal – third place	2020 Raubichi	7.5 km sprint

Iryna Leshchanka (Belarusian: Ірына Лешчанка; Russian: Ирина Валерьевна Лещенко; née Kryuko, born 30 July 1991) is a Belarusian biathlete. She won a gold medal in the 4×6 km relay at the 2018 Olympics. She also competed in the 2014/15 world cup season and represented Belarus at the Biathlon World Championships 2015 in Kontiolahti.

Leshchanka's parents divorced soon after her birth; hence she and her younger brother Victor were raised by their mother. Iryna took up biathlon at age 11, by chance – after their house burned down in a fire, the family moved to a dormitory next to a biathlon training base. Her brother followed her and also became an international biathlon competitor. Iryna debuted internationally at the 2009 World Junior Championships, placing fourth individually. In 2011 she was included in the senior national team.

== Olympic Games ==
1 medal (1 gold)

Event	Individual	Sprint	Pursuit	Mass Start	Relay	Mixed relay
(South Korea) 2018 Pyeongchang	36th	17th	17th	26th	Gold	—
(China) 2022 Beijing	41st	60th	20th	—	13th	—

== World Championships ==
0 medals

Event	Individual	Sprint	Pursuit	Mass Start	Relay	Mixed Relay	Single mixed relay
(Finland) 2015 Kontiolahti	19th	—	—	—	6th	—	—N/a
(Norway) 2016 Oslo Holmenkollen	64th	66th	—	—	18th	9th	—N/a
(Austria) 2017 Hochfilzen	14th	36th	45th	—	9th	22nd	—N/a
(Sweden) 2019 Östersund	62nd	26th	33rd	24th	11th	—	—
(Italy) 2020 Antholz	30th	52nd	49th	—	13th	12th	—
(Slovenia) 2021 Pokljuka	—	75th	—	—	4th	—	12th

*During Olympic seasons competitions are only held for those events not included in the Olympic program.
**The single mixed relay was added as an event in 2019.

== World Cup ==
=== Individual podiums ===
Season	Place	Competition	Placement
2017–18	Annecy, France	Mass Start	2

=== Relay podiums ===
Season	Place	Competition	Placement
2014–15	Ruhpolding, Germany	Relay	2
2020–21	Oberhof, Germany	Relay	2
2020–21	Nové Město na Moravě, Czech Republic	Relay	2
