= IBU Cup =

International biathlon competitions

Biathlon IBU Cup
- Status: Active
- Genre: Sporting event
- Date: Northern wintertime season
- Begins: November
- Ends: March
- Frequency: Annual
- Country: Varying
- Inaugurated: 1982
- Organiser: International Biathlon Union

The IBU Cup in biathlon has been held since the winter seasons of 1982–83 and 1988–89, for women and men, respectively. Until the 2007–08 season this competition was called Biathlon European Cup. It is the second-rank competition in biathlon after the Biathlon World Cup. The IBU Cup season lasts from November/December to March, with contests in a different venue almost every week.

== Competition ==
The IBU Cup season lasts from November–December to March, with meetings in a different venue every week excluding some holidays and a couple of weeks before IBU Open European Championships. All in all, the season comprises seven to nine meetings, with events taking place from Wednesday–Thursday through Sunday. Mixed relay competitions are held three time per season.

The athlete with the highest overall total score (i.e. total score for all disciplines) of the IBU Cup season is awarded the Big Crystal Globe trophy. A Small Crystal Globe trophy is awarded for the first place in the season total for each discipline. Hence, it is possible for an athlete to win both the Big Crystal Globe and Small Crystal Globes for the same World Cup season.

== Scoring system ==
The tables given below provide an overview of the highest-ranking biathletes and nations of each WC season. For each event, a first place gives 60 points, a 2nd place – 54 pts, a 3rd place – 48 pts, a 4th place – 43 pts, a fifth place – 40 pts, a 6th place – 38 pts, 7th – 36 pts, 8th – 34 points, 9th – 32 points, 10th – 31 points, then linearly decreasing by one point down to the 40th place. Equal placings (ties) give an equal number of points. The sum of all WC points of the season, less the points from an IBU-predetermined number of events (e.g. 2), gives the biathlete's total WC score.

== Results ==
- Romanization of Cyrillic script-based names follows the IBU's athlete records.
- See the List of IOC country codes for expansions of country abbreviations.

=== Men's overall ===
Season	Winner	Runner-up	Third place
2008–09	Christoph Knie (GER)	Hans Martin Gjedrem (NOR)	Carsten Pump (GER)
2009–10	Daniel Graf (GER)	Toni Lang (GER)	Christoph Knie (GER)
2010–11	Viktor Vasiliev (RUS)	Florian Graf (GER)	Martin Eng (NOR)
2011–12	Benedikt Doll (GER)	Michael Burtasov (RUS)	Erik Lesser (GER)
2012–13	Viktor Vasiliev (RUS)	Daniel Böhm (GER)	Benedikt Doll (GER)
2013–14	Alexey Slepov (RUS)	Timofey Lapshin (RUS)	Benedikt Doll (GER)
2014–15	Florian Graf (GER)	Antonin Guigonnat (FRA)	Johannes Kühn (GER)
2015–16	Matvey Eliseev (RUS)	Florian Graf (GER)	Petr Pashchenko (RUS)
2016–17	Alexey Volkov (RUS)	Alexandr Loginov (RUS)	Antonin Guigonnat (FRA)
2017–18	Vetle Sjåstad Christiansen (NOR)	Fredrik Gjesbakk (NOR)	Petr Pashchenko (RUS)
2018–19	Anton Babikov (RUS)	Lucas Fratzscher (GER)	Aristide Bègue (FRA)
2019–20	Lucas Fratzscher (GER)	Endre Strømsheim (NOR)	Kirill Streltsov (RUS)
2020–21	Filip Fjeld Andersen (NOR)	Philipp Nawrath (GER)	Sivert Guttorm Bakken (NOR)
2021–22	Erlend Bjøntegaard (NOR)	Håvard Gutubø Bogetveit (NOR)	Sverre Dahlen Aspenes (NOR)
2022–23	Endre Strømsheim (NOR)	Lucas Fratzscher (GER)	Vebjørn Sørum (NOR)
2023–24	Mats Øverby (NOR)	Johan-Olav Botn (NOR)	Martin Nevland (NOR)
2024–25	Isak Frey (NOR)	Sivert Guttorm Bakken (NOR)	Johan-Olav Botn (NOR)
2025–26	Gaëtan Paturel (FRA)	Damien Levet (FRA)	Antonin Guigonnat (FRA)

Statistics by country

Rank	Nation	Gold	Silver	Bronze	Total
1	Norway	6	6	6	18
2	Russia	6	3	3	12
3	Germany	5	7	6	18
4	France	1	2	3	6
Totals (4 entries)		18	18	18	54

=== Women's overall ===
Season	Winner	Runner-up	Third place
2008–09	Natalya Sokolova (RUS)	Juliane Döll (GER)	Romy Beer (GER)
2009–10	Sabrina Buchholz (GER)	Natalya Sokolova (RUS)	Carolin Hennecke (GER)
2010–11	Franziska Hildebrand (GER)	Nadine Horchler (GER)	Ekaterina Shumilova (RUS)
2011–12	Maren Hammerschmidt (GER)	Marina Korovina (RUS)	Juliane Döll (GER)
2012–13	Anastasia Zagoruiko (RUS)	Evi Sachenbacher-Stehle (GER)	Jori Moerkve (NOR)
2013–14	Anastasia Zagoruiko (RUS)	Valentina Nazarova (RUS)	Nadine Horchler (GER)
2014–15	Anna Nikulina (RUS)	Karolin Horchler (GER)	Olga Yakushova (RUS)
2015–16	Nadine Horchler (GER)	Svetlana Sleptsova (RUS)	Galina Nechkasova (RUS)
2016–17	Daria Virolaynen (RUS)	Anna Nikulina (RUS)	Karolin Horchler (GER)
2017–18	Karolin Horchler (GER)	Chloé Chevalier (FRA)	Nadine Horchler (GER)
2018–19	Victoria Slivko (RUS)	Nadine Horchler (GER)	Ingela Andersson (SWE)
2019–20	Elisabeth Högberg (SWE)	Ekaterina Glazyrina (RUS)	Anastasiia Porshneva (RUS)
2020–21	Vanessa Voigt (GER)	Karoline Erdal (NOR)	Emilie Kalkenberg (NOR)
2021–22	Lou Jeanmonnot (FRA)	Ragnhild Femsteinevik (NOR)	Elisabeth Högberg (SWE)
2022–23	Tildа Johansson (SWE)	Gilonne Guigonnat (FRA)	Paula Botet (FRA)
2023–24	Océane Michelon (FRA)	Jenny Enodd (NOR)	Karoline Erdal (NOR)
2024–25	Camille Bened (FRA)	Voldiya Galmace Paulin (FRA)	Paula Botet (FRA)
2025–26	Paula Botet (FRA)	Voldiya Galmace Paulin (FRA)	Amandine Mengin (FRA)

Statistics by country

Rank	Nation	Gold	Silver	Bronze	Total
1	Russia	6	6	4	16
2	Germany	6	5	6	17
3	France	4	4	3	11
4	Sweden	2	0	2	4
5	Norway	0	3	3	6
Totals (5 entries)		18	18	18	54
