= Raman Yaliotnau =

Belarusian biathlete (born 1993)

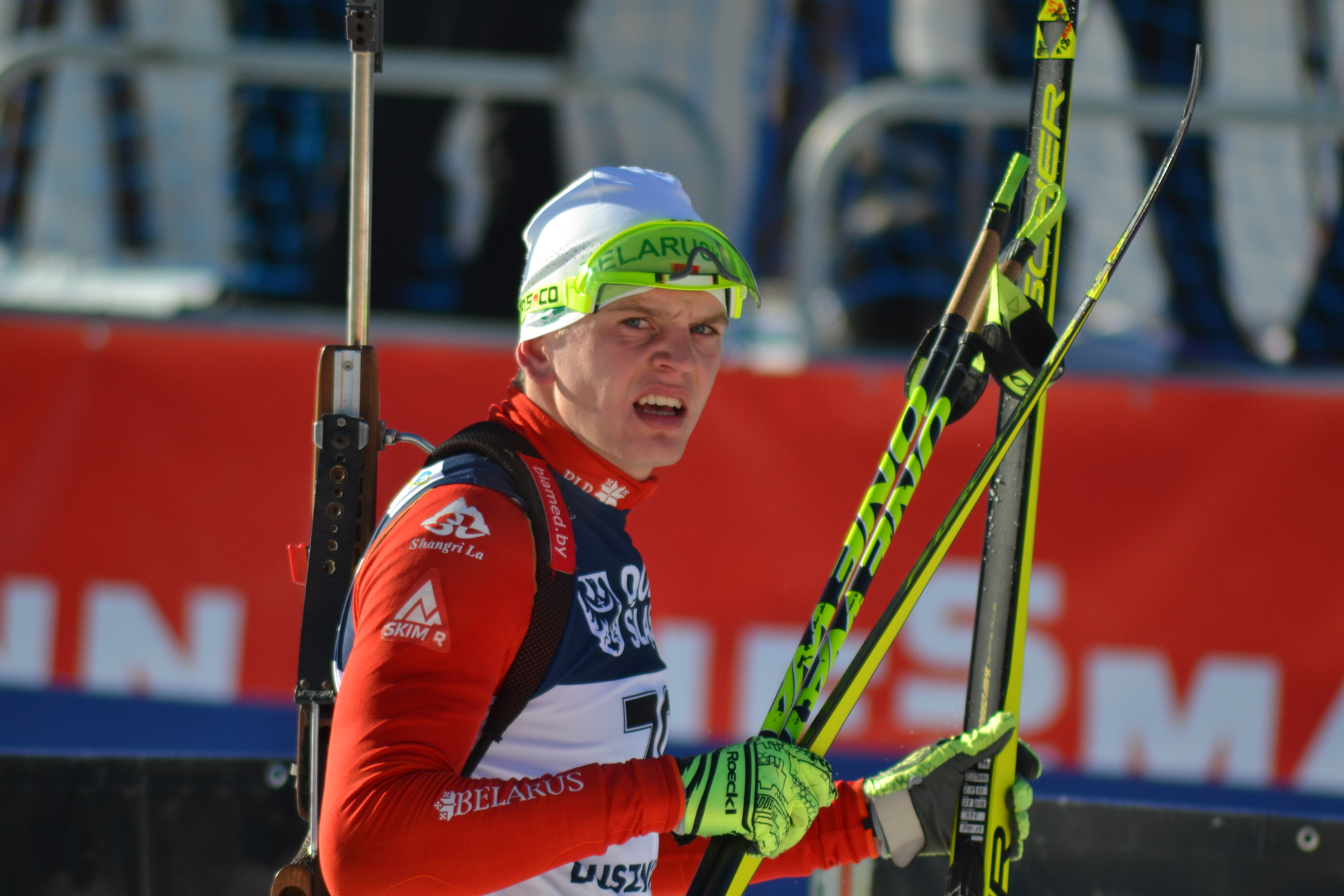
- Yaliotnau in 2017

Personal information
- Nationality: Belarusian
- Born: 10 May 1993 (age 33) Chavusy, Belarus

Sport
- Sport: Biathlon
Medal record
European Championships
Bronze medal – third place	2019 Raubichi	Mixed Relay

Raman Yaliotnau (Belarusian: Раман Ялётнаў) (born 10 May 1993) is a Belarusian biathlete. He competed in the 2018 Winter Olympics.

== Biathlon results ==
All results are sourced from the International Biathlon Union.

=== Olympic Games ===
0 medals

Event	Individual	Sprint	Pursuit	Mass start	Relay	Mixed relay
(South Korea) 2018 Pyeongchang	52nd	71st	—	—	8th	—

=== World Championships ===
0 medals

Event	Individual	Sprint	Pursuit	Mass start	Relay	Mixed relay
(Norway) 2016 Oslo Holmenkollen	61st	74th	—	—	—	—
(Austria) 2017 Hochfilzen	61st	92nd	—	—	—	—
(Sweden) 2019 Östersund	33rd	69th	—	—	10th	—
(Italy) 2020 Rasen-Antholz	53rd	32nd	42nd	—	9th	—

*During Olympic seasons competitions are only held for those events not included in the Olympic program.
