= Sergey Bocharnikov =

Belarusian biathlete (born 1988)

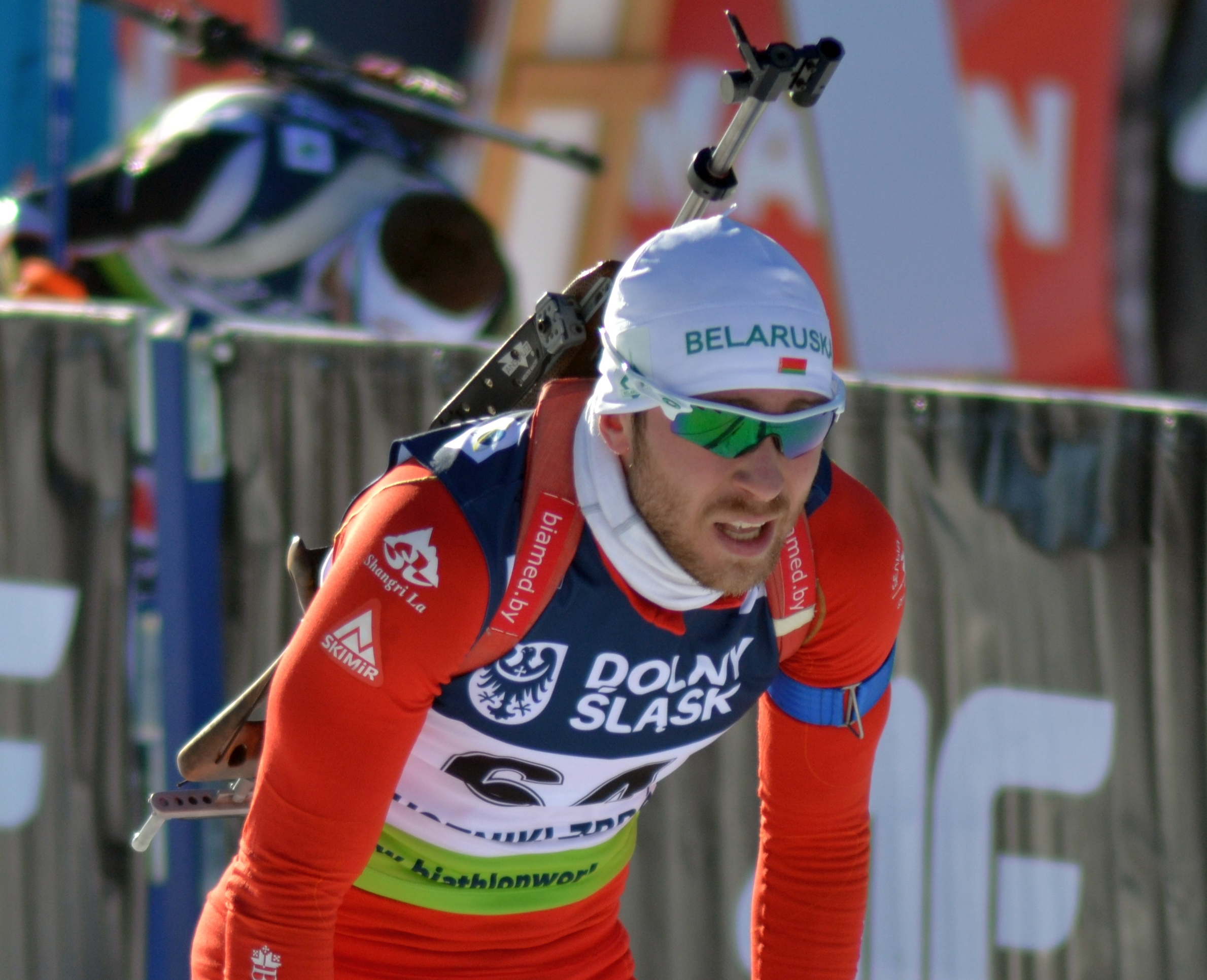
- Bocharnikov in 2017

Personal information
- Born: 28 February 1988 (age 38) Kharkov, Ukrainian SSR

Sport
- Country: Belarus
- Sport: Biathlon
Medal record
European Championships
Gold medal – first place	2020 Raubichi	Super sprint
Gold medal – first place	2020 Raubichi	12.5 km pursuit
Bronze medal – third place	2019 Raubichi	Mixed relay

Sergey Vadimovich Bocharnikov (Russian: Сергей Вадимович Бочарников; born 28 February 1988 in Kharkov) is a Belarusian biathlete who competes internationally.

He participated in the 2018 Winter Olympics.

== Biathlon results ==
All results are sourced from the International Biathlon Union.

=== Olympic Games ===
0 medals

Event	Individual	Sprint	Pursuit	Mass start	Relay	Mixed relay
(South Korea) 2018 Pyeongchang	18th	42nd	37th	—	8th	5th

=== World Championships ===
0 medals

Event	Individual	Sprint	Pursuit	Mass start	Relay	Mixed relay	Single Mixed relay
(Austria) 2017 Hochfilzen	40th	45th	40th	—	19th	22nd	—
(Sweden) 2019 Östersund	49th	73rd	—	—	10th	13th	—
(Italy) 2020 Rasen-Antholz	81st	86th	—	—	9th	12th	—
(Slovenia) 2021 Pokljuka	67th	31st	53rd	—	—	14th	—

*During Olympic seasons competitions are only held for those events not included in the Olympic program.
**The single mixed relay was added as an event in 2019.
