= Ternopil Oblast Museum =

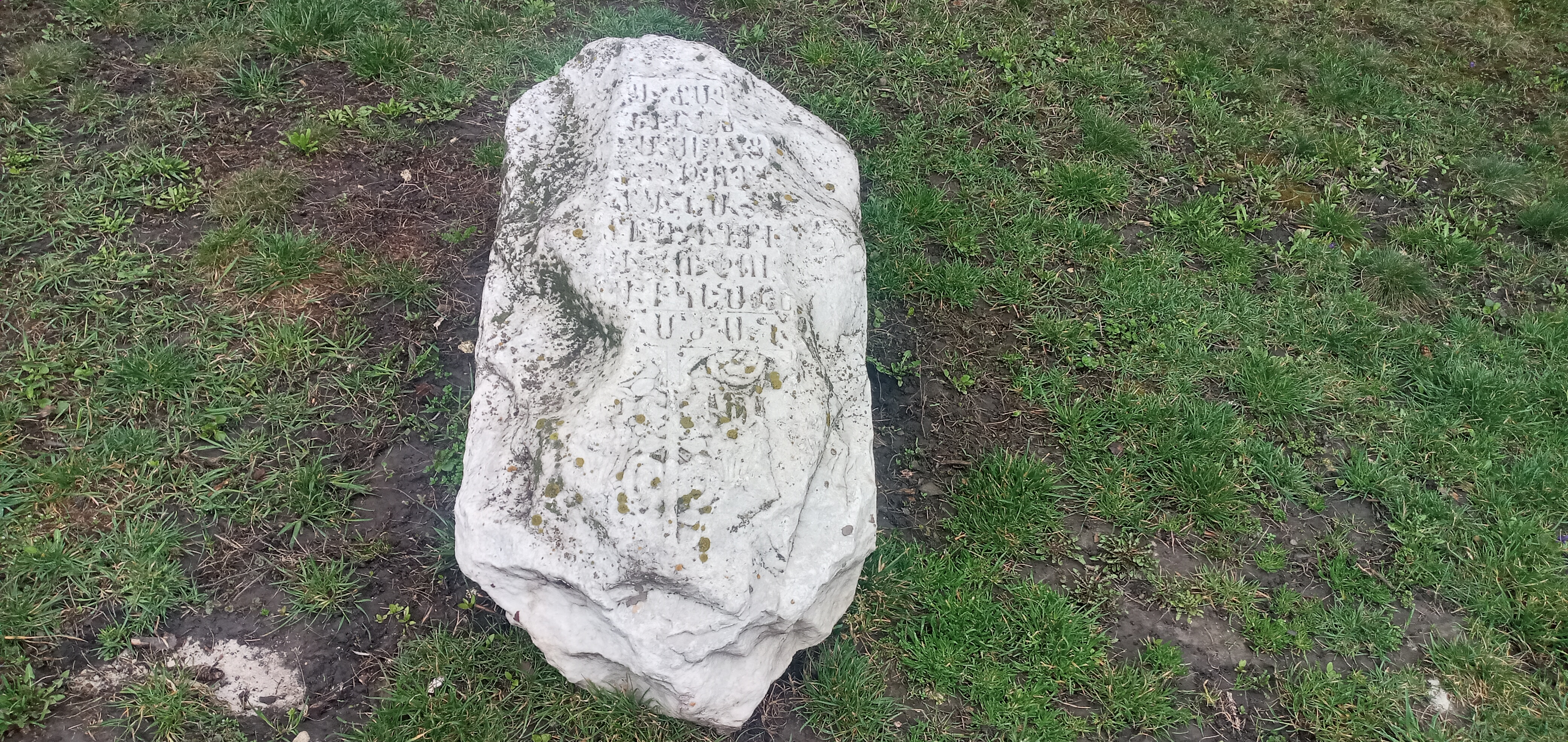
A white marble tombstone to the Armenian merchant Satetol Khadzhi Nakhabed, who died in 1763. Located in the Ternopil Museum of Local Lore

The Ternopil Oblast Museum is a regional museum in the city of Ternopil, the largest collection of artifacts and materials related to the nature, history, ethnography, and everyday life of the Ternopil Oblast, and the oldest cultural and educational institution in the Oblast.

== History ==
The Ternopil Oblast Museum was founded in 1913. It was officially opened on 13 April 1913 as the Muzeum Podolski Towarzystwa Szkoły Ludowej (founded by Polish geographer Stanisław Srokowski, who also compiled a guide to the museum. Even then, the museum's collection included almost 10,000 exhibits. On 3 May 1932, the Muzeum Podolski began operating in Ternopil under the auspices of the Ridna Shkola Society, whose history is closely linked to the name of Yakym Yarema, a professor at the Ternopil Gymnasium of the "Ridna Shkola" Society. As of 1936, his museum collection included 2,340 exhibits, which were placed in 10 departments. Both of the above-mentioned museums existed in Ternopil until the Red Army entered the city on 17 September 1939. During the change of power, the Podillia Museum of the "Ridna Shkola" Society was almost completely looted, and some of the exhibits of the Podillia Museum at the "Ridna Shkola" Society also disappeared.

On 26 December 1939, the Podillia Museum at the "Ridna Shkola" Society was reorganized, and all of its collections were transferred to the newly created Ternopil Historical and Local History Museum. The reorganized museum operated at 2 Kachala Street. The collections were replenished with materials from the district museums of Berezhany, Chortkiv, as well as paintings, sculptures, and graphic art from Western Europe from the 18th to early 20th centuries, nationalized estates of the Potocki and Kozibrodski counts, the von Dobchitzes of Zalishchyky, the Kudryntsi and Pomoriany castles, and private collections. During 1940–1941, the museum changed its location several times until June 1941, when the museum exhibits and equipment were moved to a three-story old building (built in 1857) of the former real school at 17 Briuknera Street (later Muzeina Street, now Valova Street).

During the Nazi occupation (World War II), the museum continued to operate. On 19 August 1943, the Gestapo confiscated 49 of the museum's most valuable paintings, including works by Western European artists of the 18th-19th centuries and Polish artists - "Return from War" by Józef Brandt, "Landscape" by Józef Chełmoński, "View of Kraków" and "View from the Window" by Leon Wyczółkowski, and others. The fate of these artistic masterpieces remains unknown to this day. However, museum employee Stefaniia Sadovska managed to save a significant part of the museum's collections from looting. She personally hid the most valuable items (the remaining paintings, rare ceramics, precious coins, documents, etc.) in the deep museum basements, risking her life in the process.

During the battles for Ternopil, the museum building suffered extensive damage: the roof and third floor were completely destroyed, the second floor was partially destroyed, windows and doors were broken, etc. Exhibits and museum equipment (cabinets, display cases, etc.) were severely damaged. Repair work began on 20 September 1944, and on 15 July 1945, the Ternopil Oblast Museum reopened its doors to visitors. In the 1960s and 1970s, the museum's collection included icons and carvings from closed churches in the Ternopil Oblast, including unique bas-reliefs and sculptures by Johann Georg Pinsel from the Church of the Intercession in Buchach, statues by Antoni Osiński from the Bernardine Monastery in Zbarazh, illustrated old prints from the 17th-18th centuries, published in the printing houses of the Pochaiv and Kyiv Pechersk Lavras, and the Lviv Dormition Brotherhood. The building and interior of the museum were damaged during the war (it has not been preserved; now the building houses the Main Administration of the National Police in the Ternopil Oblast) and required major repairs, so the exhibition was closed for a long time starting in 1968. After the restoration of the 18th-century Dominican Church, one of the museum's departments, the Ternopil Art Gallery (now the Ternopil Regional Art Museum), was opened there on 6 May 1978. The collection of works of fine art from the Museum formed the basis of its exhibition, and the archaeologist, art historian, and historian Ihor Gereta became its permanent director. Thanks to the persistence and efforts of director Venedykt Lavreniuk, the construction of a specially designed building for the Museum in a new location (architect Oleh Holovchak, engineer Yuzef Zimels) was completed, and its grand opening took place on 30 December 1982. A new exhibition was created, in line with the latest developments in museum science. And in the following year, 1983, the Ternopil Oblast Museum became a diploma winner at the Exhibition of Achievements of National Economy.

In 2022, the museum will have seven departments: three exhibition departments (nature, ancient history, and modern and contemporary history), as well as departments for collections, scientific and methodological work, scientific and educational work, and art and advertising.

In the 1990s and 2000s, the Ternopil Oblast Museum was one of the most important scientific and educational institutions in Ukraine. It employed 42 researchers (as of early 2009) who were responsible for all aspects of the museum's activities: research, education, exhibitions, publishing, collection development, preservation of historical and cultural artifacts, and scientific and methodological work.

Thanks to the museum's cooperation with the Ukrainian and Western diaspora, thousands of exhibits were received in the 1990s, including paintings by Jacques Hnizdovsky, Mykhailo Moroz, O. Kendl, and other artists, documentary and photographic materials on national history and national liberation struggles, as well as philatelic and numismatic collections. Correspondence was conducted with dozens of Ukrainian figures in the United States, Canada, England, Germany, and Australia.

In 1996, Ukraine's first Historical and Memorial Museum of Political Prisoners was opened in a separate building as a branch of the museum. From 2019, it has been part of the Museum of the National Liberation Struggle of Ternopil Oblast.

The museum holds annual exhibitions from its collections. Traditionally, these are Christmas and Easter exhibitions, old times art, sacred art, antiquity items, etc. The most numerous are personal exhibitions of contemporary artists and masters of fine and folk art. Ceremonial events are held on memorable dates and anniversaries, scientific conferences, and educational quests for schoolchildren.

== Collections and exhibition ==
The museum's collection includes over 256,000 exhibits. Particularly large are the collections of Ukrainian folk clothing from various Ternopil Oblast regions, fine and decorative arts, numismatics, philately, documents and photographs, and household items.

The following items are of unique significance among the exhibits of the Ternopil Oblast Museum: archaeological artifacts (approx. 40,000 items), 312 weapons, a valuable collection of icons from the 17th to early 19th centuries, old prints from the Pochaiv Lavra from the 17th-18th centuries, examples of Ukrainian national costumes from different Ternopil Oblast, carpets from the 19th-century weaving workshops of Vikniany, gold weaving from the Buchach manufactories, and Western European art from the 17th to early 19th centuries.

The museum's permanent exhibition comprises approximately 12,000 items.

The nature section's exhibit introduces visitors to the geographical location, geological history and structure, mineral resources, relief, waters, climate, flora and fauna of the region, and the characteristic landscapes of Ternopil Oblast.

The exhibition of ancient, medieval, and modern history presents materials reflecting the primitive communal, feudal, and capitalist systems of our region, covering the period from ancient times to World War I.

The Department of Modern History covers the period from World War I (1914–1918) to the present day.

The museum has an exhibition hall where monthly exhibitions of materials from its collection are held, as well as exhibitions from other museums in Ukraine and abroad, exhibitions of contemporary Ukrainian artists, and thematic exhibitions as part of All-Ukrainian projects. Materials from the collection have been presented at international exhibitions in Poland, Germany, and Romania.

In November 2021, the Ternopil Regional Local History Museum presented an exhibition entitled "Taiemnytsi davnioho pysma". Here you can see ancient notebooks, inkwells, old prints, pens, century-old school photos, blackboards, and a sandbox.

== Notable employees and directors ==
=== Directors ===
- Buma (Borys) Elhort — 1959–1975;
- Venedykt Lavreniuk — 1976–2003;
- Mykola Levchuk — 2003–2005;
- Stepan Kostiuk — 2005–2021;
- Yarema Shatarskyi — from 2021.

=== Former ===
- Stefaniia Sadovska (1888–1968) — Ukrainian museum expert, local historian, and educator;
- Ihor Gereta (1938–2002) — Ukrainian archaeologist, art historian, historian, Honored Artist of Ukraine, poet, teacher, and public and political figure;
- Tamara Udina (1937–2013) — Ukrainian historian, art historian, educator, artist, and cultural figure;
- Bohdan Lanovyk (1938–2019) — Ukrainian historian, local historian, scientist, professor, and candidate of historical sciences;
- Lev Krupa (1943–2000) — Ukrainian writer, journalist, public and political figure, educator, People's Deputy of Ukraine of the 1st convocation (1990–1994);
- Yefrem Hasai (1938–2019) — Ukrainian historian, museum expert, local historian, publicist.
- Vira Stetsko (1956–2016) — Ukrainian art historian, public figure. Member of the National Union of Journalists of Ukraine (1982);
- Oleksandr Sytnyk — Ukrainian historian, archaeologist;
- Liudmyla Bulhakova — Ukrainian historian, local historian;
- Pavlo Slyvka — Ukrainian educator, museum worker, historian, local historian, public and political figure;
- Bohdan Strotsen — Ukrainian historian, archaeologist, educator;
- Liudmyla Strotsen — Ukrainian historian, ethnographer, monument preservationist;
- Maryna Yahodynska — Ukrainian historian, archaeologist, monument preservationist;
- Yaroslava Haidukevych — Ukrainian local historian, museum expert, member of the board of the Ternopil Regional Organization of the National Union of Local Historians of Ukraine.

=== Present ===
- Oleh Havryliuk

== Bibliography ==
- (in Ukrainian) Гайдукевич Я., Костюк С., Тернопільський обласний краєзнавчий музей // Ternopil Encyclopedic Dictionary: in 4 v. / editorial board: H. Yavorskyi and other, Ternopil: "Zbruch", 2008, V. 3: П—Я, S. 432. — ISBN 978-966-528-279-2.
- Піскова Е. М. Тернопільський обласний краєзнавчий музей // Encyclopedia of History of Ukraine : у 10 т. / редкол.: В. А. Смолій (голова) та ін. ; Інститут історії України НАН України. — К. : Наукова думка, 2013. — Т. 10 : Т — Я. — С. 71. — ISBN 978-966-00-1359-9.
- Тернопільський обласний краєзнавчий музей: 100 років бібліографічний покажчик. Уклад. Л.Оленич; авт. вступ. ст. Гайдукевич Я., Костюк С.; кер. проекту та наук. ред. В. Вітенко; ред. О. Раскіна - Т.: Підручники і посібники. 2013. - 224 с.
- Тернопільський обласний краєзнавчий музей: історія, фонди - 100 років: Нарис-путівник. / Видання друге, доповнене. - Тернопіль: ТОВ "Меркьюрі Тернопіль", "Терно-граф", 2013. - 32 ст.; іл.
