= Lev Krupa =

Ukrainian poet and politician (1944–2000)

- Лев Крупа
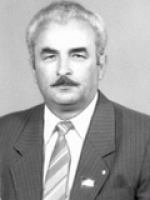

People's Deputy of Ukraine
- In office 15 May 1990 – 10 May 1994
- Preceded by: Position established
- Succeeded by: Leonid Kravchuk
- Constituency: Ternopil Oblast, Terebovlia

Personal details
- Born: 29 December 1943^{[A]} Berezowica Wielka, General Government, Nazi Germany (now Velyka Berezovytsia, Ukraine)
- Died: 28 December 2000 (aged 56) Ternopil, Ukraine
- Party: Rukh (1989–1995)
- Education: Chernivtsi University

Military service
- Allegiance: Soviet Union
- Branch/service: Soviet Army
- Years of service: 1963–1966
- A. As listed on passport. Also given as 1 January 1944.

Lev Mykolaiovych Krupa (Ukrainian: Лев Миколайович Крупа; 29 December 1943 or 1 January 1944 – 28 December 2000) was a Ukrainian poet and politician who served as a People's Deputy of Ukraine from 1990 to 1994, representing Terebovlia as a member of the People's Movement of Ukraine.

== Early life and career ==
Lev Mykolaiovych Krupa was born in the village (now rural settlement) of Velyka Berezovytsia in Galicia. His passport stated that he was born on 29 December 1943; other sources, such as the Verkhovna Rada (parliament of Ukraine), claim his birth date as 1 January 1944.

Krupa first studied at Chernivtsi University from 1962 to 1963; after serving in the Soviet Army for three years, he returned in 1966, graduating from the university's philology faculty in 1970. After his graduation, he worked at the Ternopil Local History Museum, serving as senior researcher in the museum's art gallery until 1972, when he became a Ukrainian language and literature teacher in Velyka Berezovytsia and Myshkovychi. He returned to the Ternopil Local History Museum as a senior researcher of art in 1985.

== Political career ==
Krupa was a founding member of the Ternopil Oblast branch of the People's Movement of Ukraine (Ukrainian: Народний Рух України, romanized: Narodnyi Rukh Ukrainy, abbreviated Rukh). He was editor of the branch's newspaper, Ternove pole from 1989 to 1992.

In the 1990 Ukrainian Supreme Soviet election, Krupa was the candidate of the Democratic Bloc coalition in Terebovlia. He was successfully elected within the first round of voting, gathering 60.94% of the vote against five other candidates. Within the Verkhovna Rada, Krupa was a member of the Culture and Spiritual Revival Committee.

== Poetry ==
In addition to his political career, Krupa was also known as a writer, particularly of poetry. He became a member of the National Writers' Union of Ukraine in 1991, and published three poems in his lifetime: "Four Strings" (1986), "In the Plow's Mirror" (1990) and "Pain Level" (1991). This was followed by a posthumous 2007 publication of a poetry collection.

Krupa also worked as a translator from Polish, translating Adam Mickiewicz's Crimean Sonnets into Ukrainian.

== Later life and death ==
From 1991 to 2000, Krupa was general director of Ternopil Regional State Television and Radio Company (now Suspilne Ternopil). He left Rukh in 1995.

Krupa died on 28 December 2000 in Ternopil. Since his death, monuments to him have been erected in Velyka Berzovytsia and Ternopil.
