= Volodymyr Boiko (Batkivshchyna politician) =

Ukrainian politician

- Володимир Бойко
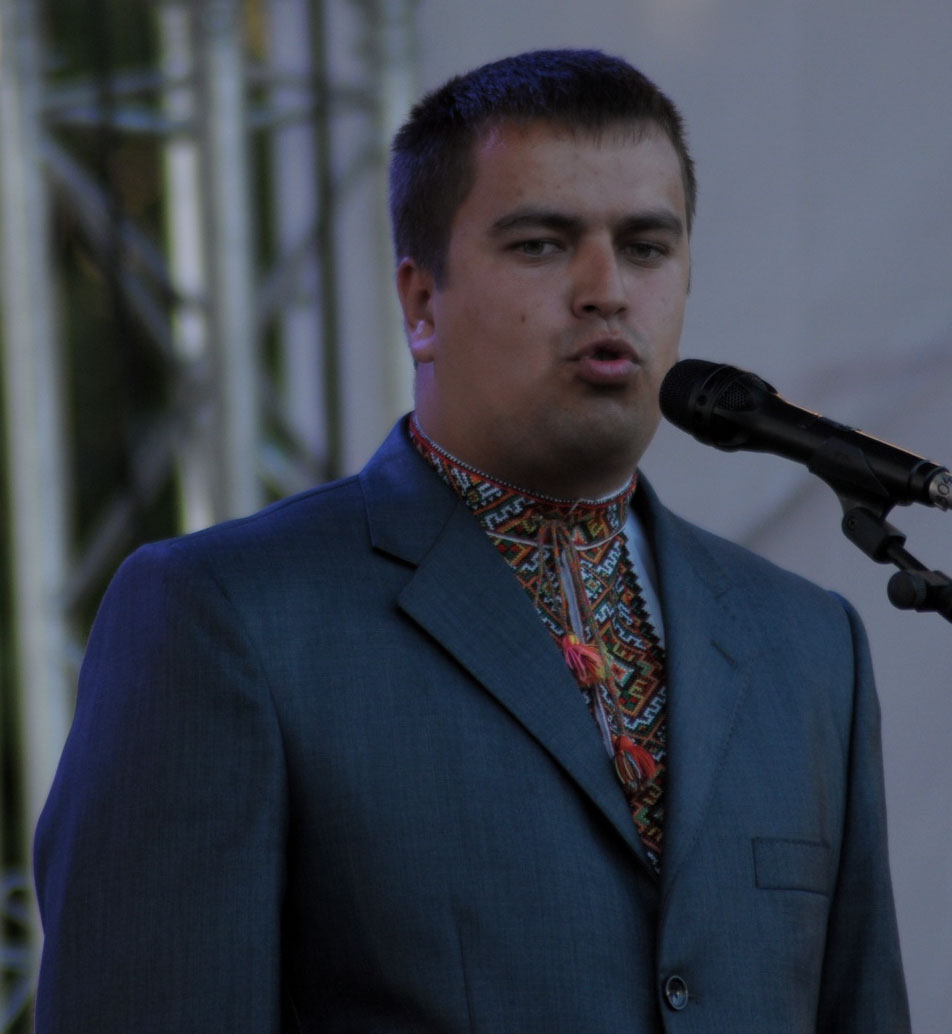
- Boiko in 2012

People's Deputy of Ukraine
- In office 12 December 2012 – 27 November 2014
- Preceded by: Constituency established
- Succeeded by: Taras Yuryk
- Constituency: Ternopil Oblast, No. 165

Personal details
- Born: 16 February 1985 (age 41) Ternopil, Ukrainian SSR, Soviet Union (now Ukraine)
- Party: Batkivshchyna (since 2003)
- Website: infoprostir.te.ua

Military service
- Allegiance: Ukraine
- Years of service: 2003–2004

Volodymyr Bohdanovych Boiko (Ukrainian: Володи́мир Богда́нович Бо́йко; born 16 February 1985) is a Ukrainian politician from Batkivshchyna who served as a People's Deputy of Ukraine from Ternopil Oblast from 2012 to 2014. Prior to his election, he was a longtime activist and a party functionary for Batkivshchyna.

== Early life and career ==
Volodymyr Bohdanovych Boiko was born on 16 February 1985 in the city of Ternopil, then part of the Ukrainian Soviet Socialist Republic within the Soviet Union. He studied at the Viacheslav Chornovil Galician Vocational College beginning in 2002, eventually graduating with a specialisation in jurisprudence. From May 2003 to November 2004 he served in the Armed Forces of Ukraine as a conscript in the city of Fastiv.

Boiko began participating in Ukrainian politics while he was studying in college, joining the Ukraine Without Kuchma and Rise up, Ukraine! protests. He joined the Batkivshchyna party on the day he became 18, and rapidly rose through the ranks, going from a member of the Ternopil city committee of Batkivshchyna in March 2005 to first deputy chairman of the Ternopil Oblast committee of Batkivshchyna by January 2008. He was also the leader of Young Batkivshchyna from April 2005 to January 2007. From 2006 to 2009, he also served as a member of the Ternopil Oblast Council.

== People's Deputy of Ukraine ==
During the 2012 Ukrainian parliamentary election Boiko was the candidate of Batkivshchyna in Ukraine's 165th electoral district, including the city of Zboriv and its surroundings. The election was marked by claims by Boiko's opponents that his party had sold the district to agricultural magnate Ivan Chaikivskyi, as well as a "clone" candidate who shared Boiko's name and surname in an attempt to steal votes from him. Boiko ultimately won the election, gathering 39.53% of the vote and defeating his closest opponent, Chaikivskyi.

Boiko did not run in the 2014 Ukrainian parliamentary election, and he ran for the Ternopil Oblast Council in 2015. He was not successfully elected.
