= Khatky, Ternopil Oblast =

Rural locality in Ternopil Oblast, Ukraine

Khatky Хатки
- Location in Ternopil Oblast
- Coordinates: 49°27′26″N 25°32′13″E
- Country: Ukraine
- Oblast: Ternopil Oblast
- Raion: Ternopil Raion
- Hromada: Velyka Berezovytsia settlement hromada
- Time zone: UTC+2 (EET)
  - Summer (DST): UTC+3 (EEST)
- Postal code: 47732

Khatky (Ukrainian: Хатки) is a village in Velyka Berezovytsia settlement hromada, Ternopil Raion, Ternopil Oblast, Ukraine.

== History ==
It was founded in 1848 as a hamlet of Velyka Luka.

In the late 19th and mid-20th centuries – the Khatky Luchanski.

== Religion ==
- Holy Trinity chapel (first half of the 20th century, 1989, reconstructed).

== Sources ==
- (in Ukrainian) Ханас В., Хатки // Ternopil Encyclopedic Dictionary: in 4 v. / editorial board: H. Yavorskyi and other, Ternopil: "Zbruch", 2008, V. 3: П—Я, S. 544. — ISBN 978-966-528-279-2.
