= Seredynky =

Rural locality in Ternopil Oblast, Ukraine

Seredynky Серединки
- Location in Ternopil Oblast
- Coordinates: 49°28′36″N 25°29′34″E
- Country: Ukraine
- Oblast: Ternopil Oblast
- Raion: Ternopil Raion
- Hromada: Velyka Berezovytsia settlement hromada
- Time zone: UTC+2 (EET)
  - Summer (DST): UTC+3 (EEST)
- Postal code: 47730

Seredynky (Ukrainian: Серединки) is a village in Velyka Berezovytsia settlement hromada, Ternopil Raion, Ternopil Oblast, Ukraine.

== History ==
The first written mention of the village was in 1727.

== Religion ==
- St. Nicholas church (1913, brick, architect O. Lushpynskyi).

== Sources ==
- (in Ukrainian) Мельничук Б., Серединки // Ternopil Encyclopedic Dictionary: in 4 v. / editorial board: H. Yavorskyi and other, Ternopil: "Zbruch", 2008, V. 3: П—Я, S. 250. — ISBN 978-966-528-279-2.
