= Yaroslav Pavulyak =

Yaroslav Pavulyak

Yaroslav Ivanovych Pavulyak (also known as Jaroslav Pavuliak; Ukrainian: Ярослав Іванович Павуляк; 30 April 1948 – 25 November 2010) was a Ukrainian poet.

== Life ==
He was born in the village of Nastasiv in Ternopil, western Ukraine. He attended art school in Lviv, focusing on ceramics. He graduated in 1967. And began working at different galleries and craftwork sites while also doing various restoration work. In 1969, he built a statue of Taras Shevchenko in Nastasiv which led to a severe prosecution of his family by KGB. He was threatened and put under house arrest for two months. Later, he attended the University of Chernivtsy. In December 1971 he was fired because he was again promoting Ukrainian language and culture. He restarted his studies in 1972 at the Department of Teaching at the University of Kamianets-Podilskyi, where he was again forced to leave for the same reason as he left Tchernivtsy.

In 1973 he was accepted to the Maxim Gorky Literature Institute in Moscow. After graduating and marrying a Czechoslovak citizen, he relocated to the former Czechoslovakia where he worked at a literary agency, LITA. Later he returned to Ukraine. He worked as a director of a Museum of Political Prisoners and Victims of Communist Regime in Ternopil. He was a member of The National Writers' Union of Ukraine and the Society of Ukrainian Writers in Slovakia (Spolok ukrajinských spisovateľov na Slovensku).

== Death ==
He died at his home in Ternopil, aged 62.

== Literary work ==
Pavulyak wrote three books of poems, available at: https://pavulyak.wordpress.com/poetry/

- Блудний лебідь – Bludniy lebid (1993)
- Mогили на конях – Mohyly na konyax (1999)
- Дороги додому – Dorohy dodomu: Poezii. Poemy (2009)
