= Petrykiv, Ternopil Oblast =

Rural locality in Ternopil Oblast, Ukraine

Petrykiv Петриків
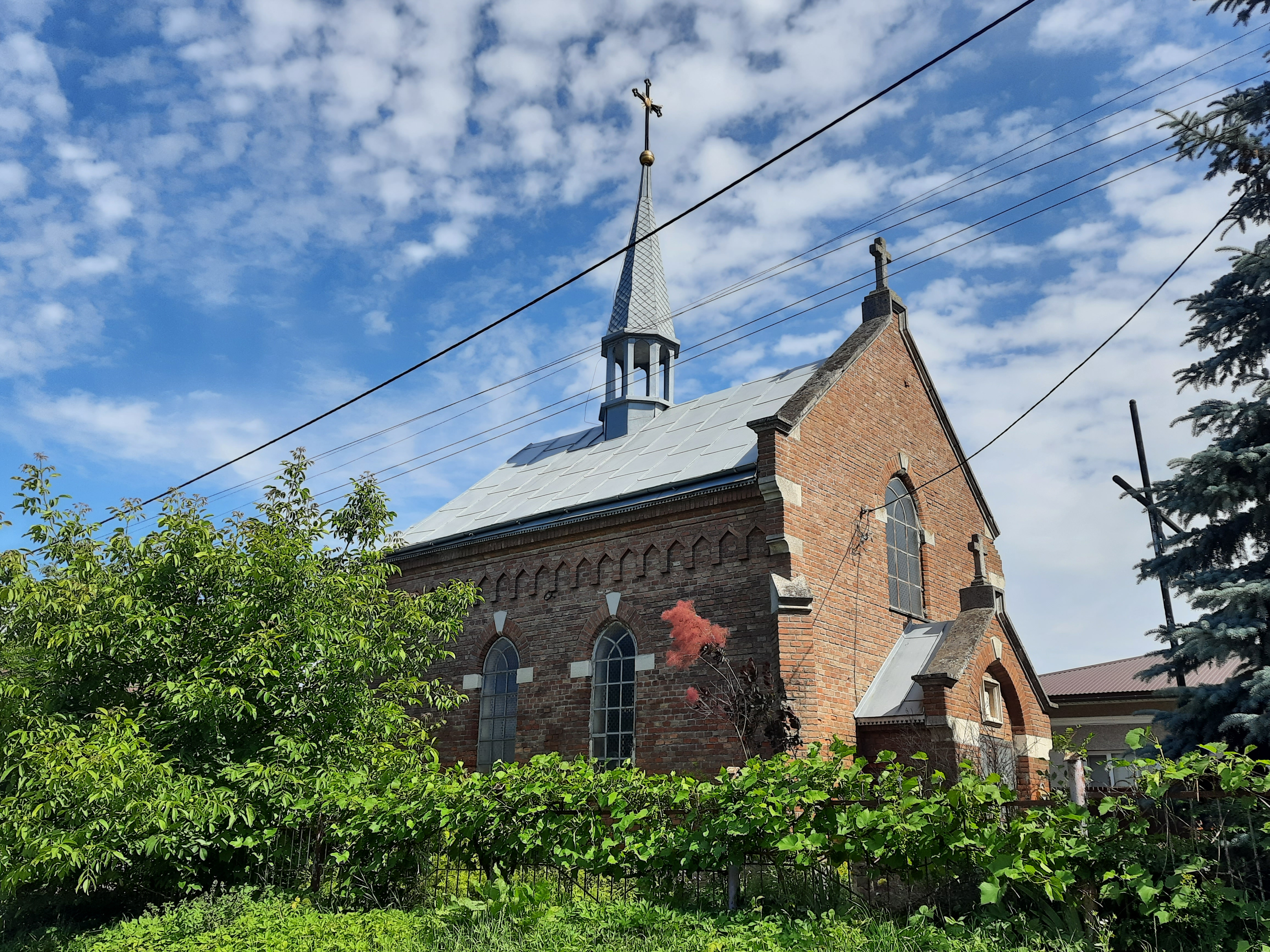
- Saints Peter and Paul church

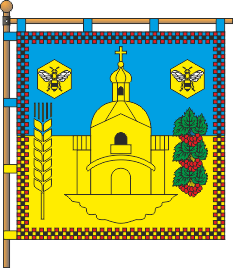
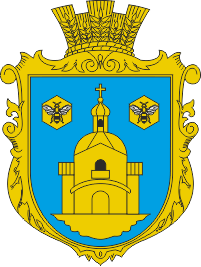
- Flag Coat of arms

- Location in Ternopil Oblast
- Coordinates: 49°31′40″N 25°34′38″E
- Country: Ukraine
- Oblast: Ternopil Oblast
- Raion: Ternopil Raion
- Hromada: Velyka Berezovytsia settlement hromada
- Time zone: UTC+2 (EET)
  - Summer (DST): UTC+3 (EEST)
- Postal code: 47720

Petrykiv (Ukrainian: Петриків) is a village in Velyka Berezovytsia settlement hromada, Ternopil Raion, Ternopil Oblast, Ukraine.

== History ==
The first written mention of the village was in 1441.

== Religion ==
UGCC Parishes:

- Saint Elijah the Prophet church (1903, brick; consecrated by Metropolitan Andrey Sheptytsky; reconstructed in 1990),
- Church of All Saints of the Ukrainian People (2013).

There is also the Roman Catholic Saints Peter and Paul church (reconstructed in 1995).

== Sources ==
- (in Ukrainian) Батько М., Уніят В., Петриків // Ternopil Encyclopedic Dictionary: in 4 v. / editorial board: H. Yavorskyi and other, Ternopil: "Zbruch", 2008, V. 3: П—Я, S. 55. — ISBN 978-966-528-279-2.
