= Vasyl Ilchyshyn =

Ukrainian archaeologist, historian, scientist, and teacher (born 1982)

- Василь Ільчишин
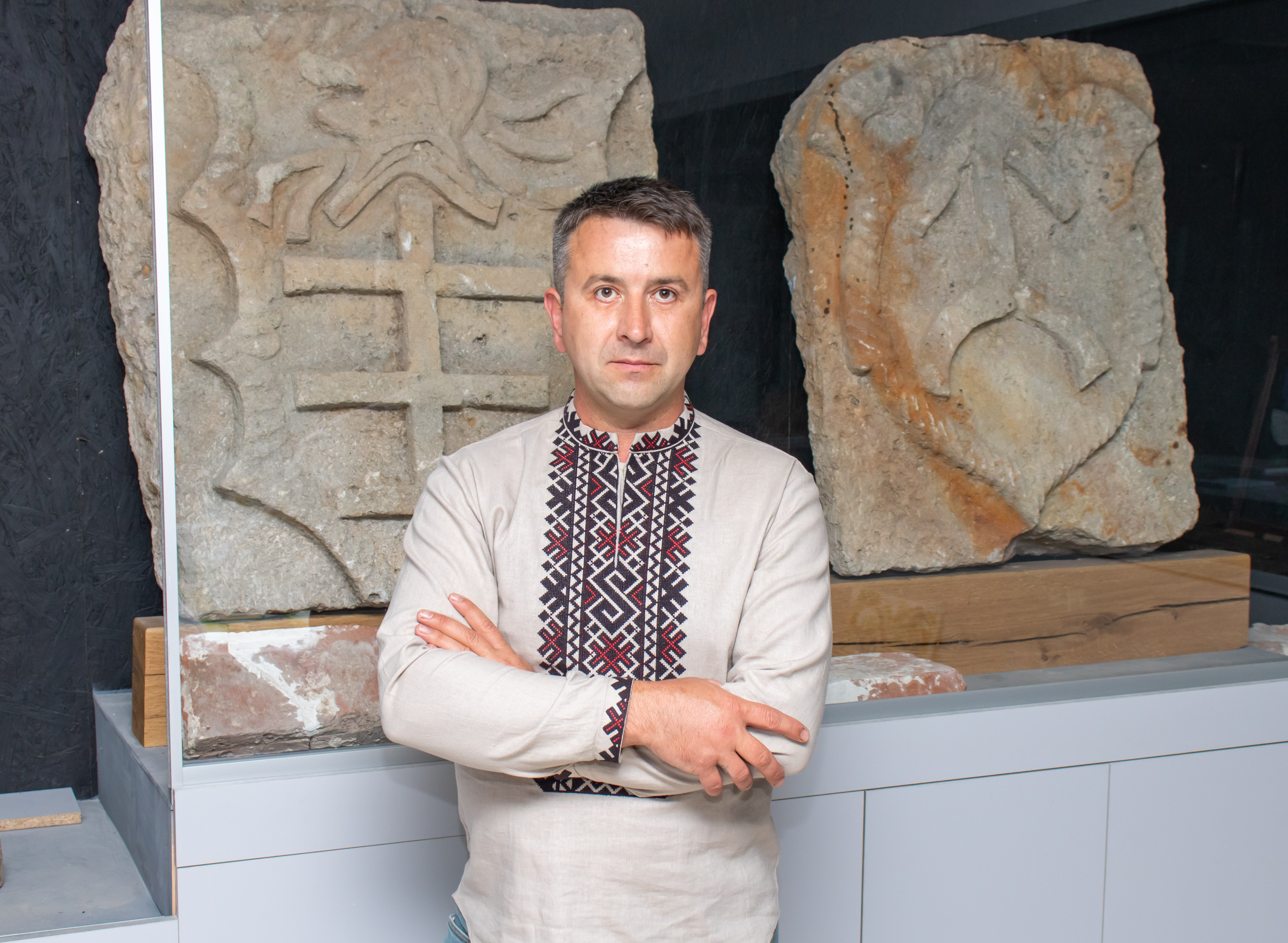
- Born: 17 March 1982 (age 44); Kobyllia, Ternopil Oblast
- Education: Ternopil Volodymyr Hnatiuk National Pedagogical University
- Occupations: Archaeologist, historian, scientist, and teacher
- Awards: Volodymyr Hnatiuk Prize

Vasyl Vasyliovych Ilchyshyn (Ukrainian: Василь Васильович Ільчишин; born 17 March 1982, Kobyllia, Ternopil Oblast) is a Ukrainian archaeologist, historian, scientist, and teacher. Member of the Union of Archaeologists of Ukraine (2008), Shevchenko Scientific Society. Acting Director General of the Kremenets-Pochayiv State Historical and Architectural Reserve (since 1 November 2023).

== Biography ==
Vasyl Ilchyshyn in born on 17 March 1982 in Kobyllia, now Zbarazh Hromada, Ternopil Raion, Ternopil Oblast, Ukraine.

Ilchyshyn graduated from the Dobrovodivka Technical Lyceum (1999) and the History Department of Ternopil Volodymyr Hnatiuk National Pedagogical University (2007).

In 2000–2002, he served in the army. He worked as a geography teacher at the Hvardiyske Educational Complex (2004–2005, Hvardiiske, Khmelnytskyi Oblast), a senior researcher (2005–2013), and head of the department of scientific and protective work of archeological monuments at the Ternopil Regional Communal Inspectorate for the Protection of Historical and Cultural Monuments. He also conducted research in Lithuania, the Czech Republic, and Slovakia.

Researcher at the Research Center "Security Archaeological Service of Ukraine" of the NASU Institute of Archaeology.

Since 1 September 2020, he has been the founder and director of the Zaliztsi Museum of Local Lore.

On 1 November 2023, he was appointed acting director general of the Kremenets-Pochayiv State Historical and Architectural Reserve.

== Museum activities ==
While in office:

- developed a calendar "Sights of the Zaliztsi region"
- interesting facts about local figures of saints were published
- installation of the discovered tombstones at the ancient Jewish cemetery was completed
- during excavations in Zaliztsi, 10 human skeletons of the 17th – early 19th century were discovered (September 2020)
- organized and presented the exhibition project "Embroidery of the Zaliztsi Region" at the Ternopil Regional Art Museum (2022)

== Archaeological and scientific activities ==
Ilchyshyn has been interested in archaeology since childhood. Since 2007, he has led archaeological expeditions in Ternopil and Lviv Oblasts.

On 27 February 2020, he opened an exhibition "Archaeological research in the village of Zaliztsi in Zboriv district in 2019" in the Kremenets Museum of Local Lore.

Head of:

- Head of the Mylne Archaeological Expedition of the State Enterprise "OASU Podilska Archaeology" of the National Academy of Sciences of Ukraine (2007–2012; Mylne, Ternopil Oblast). During the study of cemeteries and settlements of the Vysotska culture, 44 burials were discovered
- Honcharivka expedition of the State Enterprise "OASU Podilska Archeology" of the National Academy of Sciences of Ukraine (2014, 2016; near Honcharivka, Zolochiv Raion, Lviv Oblast). The expedition localized one of the earliest cemeteries of the Vysocian culture, investigated a settlement of the Vysocian culture and a bronze foundry of the Early Scythian period
- Zaliztsi Archaeological Expedition of the State Enterprise "Research Center of OASU" of the IA of the National Academy of Sciences of Ukraine and the Zaliztsi Museum of Local Lore (since 2019). The expedition explores the ancient city center (XV-XVIII centuries) of Zaliztsi in Ternopil Oblast and archaeological sites on the territory of the Zaliztsi Hromada

Participant:

- many scientific and practical conferences in Ukraine and abroad (Poland, Hungary, Slovakia, Moldova, Belarus)
- international expedition of the Adam Mickiewicz University in Poznań and the IA of the National Academy of Sciences of Ukraine, within the framework of the project "Kontynuacja i zmiana. Społeczności kurhanowe z III i II tys. przed Chr. W dorzeczu górnego Dniiestru w świetle badan multidyscyplinarnych" (2019–2021; headed by Professor P. Makarowicz);
- excavation of a burial site dating back to the third millennium BC (2020; near the Bilyi Potik, Chortkiv Raion, Ternopil Oblast)

Ilchyshyn is the author of more than 40 scientific publications.

== Awards ==
- Volodymyr Hnatiuk Prize (2023) – for the creation and promotion of the exhibition project "Vyshyvka Zolozetskoho Kraiu".
