= Nastasiv =

Village in Ternopil Oblast, Ukraine

Nastasiv Настасів
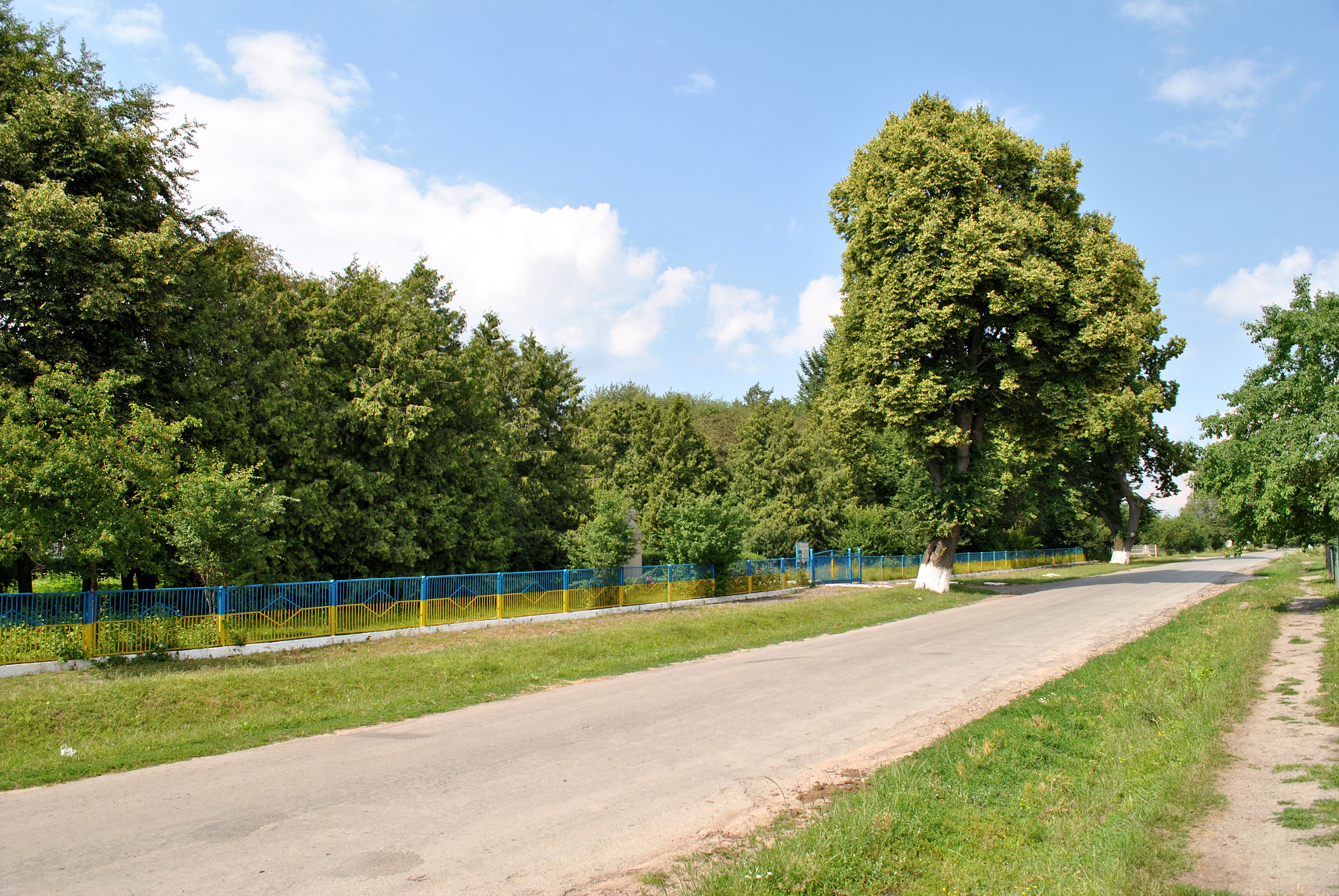

- Location in Ternopil Oblast
- Coordinates: 49°25′29″N 25°30′26″E
- Country: Ukraine
- Oblast: Ternopil Oblast
- Raion: Ternopil Raion
- Hromada: Velyka Berezovytsia Hromada
- Postal code: 47734

Nastasiv (Ukrainian: Настасів) is a village in Velyka Berezovytsia settlement hromada, Ternopil Raion, Ternopil Oblast, Ukraine.

== History ==
The first written mention is in 1433, later mentioned in 1443 and 1449.

== Religion ==
- Church of the Ascension (1902, painted in 1930-1931 by S. Borachok, D. Horniatkevych, M. Zorii, A. Lepkyi, A. Nakonechnyi, UGCC)
- Church of the Immaculate Conception of the Blessed Virgin Mary (1729, damaged during the German-Soviet war, partially reconstructed in 2009, RCC)

== Notable residents ==
- Ivan Chaikivskyi (born 1972), Ukrainian businessman and politician
- Yaroslav Pavulyak (1948–2010), Ukrainian poet
