= Luchka, Ternopil Oblast =

Rural locality in Ternopil Oblast, Ukraine

Luchka Лучка
- Location in Ternopil Oblast
- Coordinates: 49°24′46″N 25°36′4″E
- Country: Ukraine
- Oblast: Ternopil Oblast
- Raion: Ternopil Raion
- Hromada: Velyka Berezovytsia settlement hromada
- Time zone: UTC+2 (EET)
  - Summer (DST): UTC+3 (EEST)
- Postal code: 47732

Luchka (Ukrainian: Лучка) is a village in Velyka Berezovytsia settlement hromada, Ternopil Raion, Ternopil Oblast, Ukraine.

== History ==
The first written mention of the village was in 1785.

== Religion ==
- Church of the Presentation of the Blessed Virgin Mary (1880–1903, brick, UGCC and OCU).

== Sources ==
- (in Ukrainian) Бігус М., Волинський Б., Лучка // Ternopil Encyclopedic Dictionary: in 4 v. / editorial board: H. Yavorskyi and other, Ternopil: "Zbruch", 2005, V. 2: К—О, S. 410. — ISBN 966-528-199-2.
- "Łuczka". Geographical Dictionary of the Kingdom of Poland (in Polish). 5. Warszawa: Kasa im. Józefa Mianowskiego. 1884. p. 794—795.
