= Yosypivka, Velyka Berezovytsia settlement hromada, Ternopil Raion, Ternopil Oblast =

Rural locality in Ternopil Oblast, Ukraine

Yosypivka Йосипівка
- Location in Ternopil Oblast
- Coordinates: 49°24′35″N 25°26′28″E
- Country: Ukraine
- Oblast: Ternopil Oblast
- Raion: Ternopil Raion
- Hromada: Velyka Berezovytsia settlement hromada
- Time zone: UTC+2 (EET)
  - Summer (DST): UTC+3 (EEST)
- Postal code: 47735

Yosypivka (Ukrainian: Йосипівка) is a village in Velyka Berezovytsia settlement hromada, Ternopil Raion, Ternopil Oblast, Ukraine.

== History ==
The first written mention of the village was in 1785.

== Religion ==
- Two churches of the UGCC of the Saints Peter and Paul (1910, wooden, transported from the village of Domamorych; located on an island in the middle of a pond; built in 1933; rebuilt from a Roman Catholic church in 2005).

== Sources ==
- "o wsi w h. Nastasów". Geographical Dictionary of the Kingdom of Poland (in Polish). 6. Warszawa: Kasa im. Józefa Mianowskiego. 1885. p. 927.
