= Bernardine Monastery, Zbarazh =

Bernardine Monastery
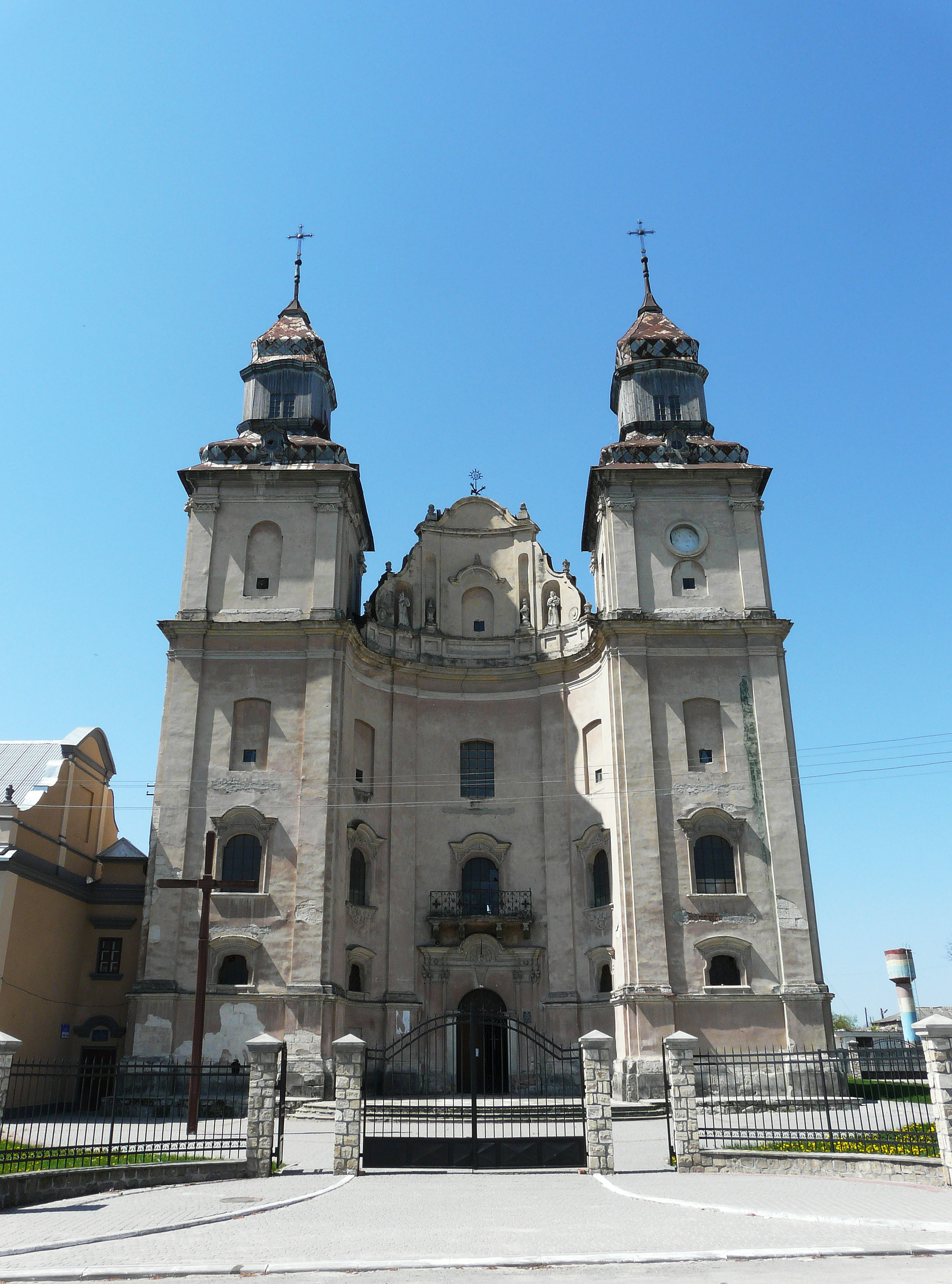
- The towers of the Bernardine Church
- Interactive map of Bernardine Monastery

Monastery information
- Denomination: Roman Catholic
- Established: 1627
- Reestablished: 1726

People
- Founder: Jerzy Zbaraski

Immovable Monument of National Significance of Ukraine
- Official name: Комплекс споруд монастиря Бернардинів (Building complex of Bernardine Monastery)
- Type: Architecture
- Reference no.: 190009

The Bernardine Monastery (Ukrainian: Монастир бернардинців) is a historic Roman Catholic monastery complex in Zbarazh, Ternopil Oblast, built in the 18th century. It is an architectural monument of national significance.

== History ==
The first Bernardine monastery in Zbarazh was founded in 1627 by Jerzy Zbaraski and destroyed during the Polish-Turkish War in 1675. In 1726, the future Grand Crown Hetman Józef Potocki renewed the subsidy. The reconstruction was carried out in the 18th century by the Kievan Voivode Stanisław Potocki and his wife Helena née Zamoyska. The author of the design for the renovated monastery was Jan Antoni Gans. The completed complex with the St. Anthony and St. George Church was consecrated on 2 August 1755 by the Bishop of Lutsk, Antoni Erazm Wołłowicz. The altars inside the building were made in the following years, until 1759, by the Lviv artist Antoni Osiński. The monastery was one of the most important Bernardine seats in the province. From 1782, it housed a philosophy study, and in 1784–1805, a Latin gymnasium, which was later moved to Berezhany. In 1788, the monastery church was severely damaged in a great fire that destroyed the entire town, but it was quickly renovated. As the parish church in Zbarazh was completely destroyed in the same fire, the monastery church took over its functions.

The monastery retained its importance even under Austrian Partition. It was a significant center of monastic life; from 1798, monks ran a theological study there, and from 1816, a secondary school. During World War I and the Polish-Bolshevik War, the complex suffered serious damage, but was renovated thanks to the efforts of Abbot Daniel Magoński. In the interwar period, it continued to be the seat of the Bernardines and the schools they ran, including the Henryk Sienkiewicz State Gymnasium.

The monks were forced to leave Zbarazh only in 1945, when the Soviet authorities decided to convert the historic monastery into a hospital and then a semiconductor manufacturing plant. This caused enormous damage to the complex of sacred buildings.

The Bernardines regained their monastery in Zbarazh in 1990. However, the monastery church was so badly damaged that services could not be held there, and the local Roman Catholic community could only use a small chapel. On 3 September 2000, the Roman Catholic Metropolitan of Lviv, Marian Jaworski, reconsecrated the restored monastery church in the presence of a delegation of Bernardines, representatives of the local Greek Catholic clergy, municipal authorities, and Polish diplomats from the consulate in Lviv. In addition to local believers and Orthodox and Greek Catholic residents of Zbarazh, the ceremony was also attended by former residents of Zbarazh who had been expelled from the city in 1945.

== Architecture ==
The main monastery church is the St. Anthony and St. George Church. It is a two-tower, three-nave basilica with a concave façade topped with a high attic. Originally, there were two statues of the church's patron saints on either side of the main entrance. There are decorative pilasters in the corners of the building. Only fragments of Antoni Osiński altars have survived. There were thirteen altars in the church. The main altar featured images of the temple's patrons.

Other elements of the church's furnishings are located in various museums and galleries (including the Oblast Museum in Ternopil and the Lviv Picture Gallery in Olesko). A one-story monastery building with monks' cells is connected to the church. To the north of the temple, there is a bell tower, which in the past also served as the entrance gate to the complex of buildings.

== Gallery ==
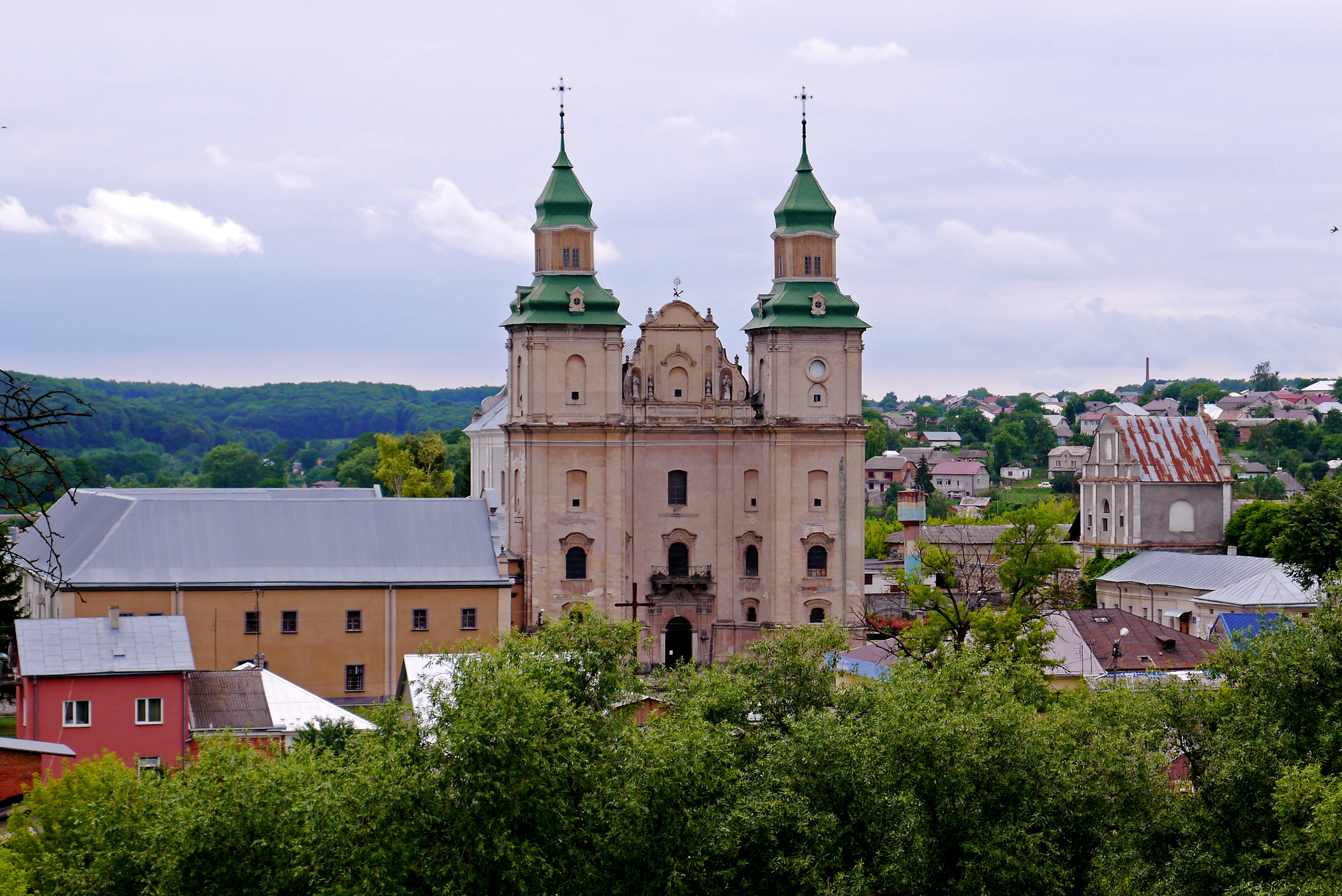
Bernardine Church

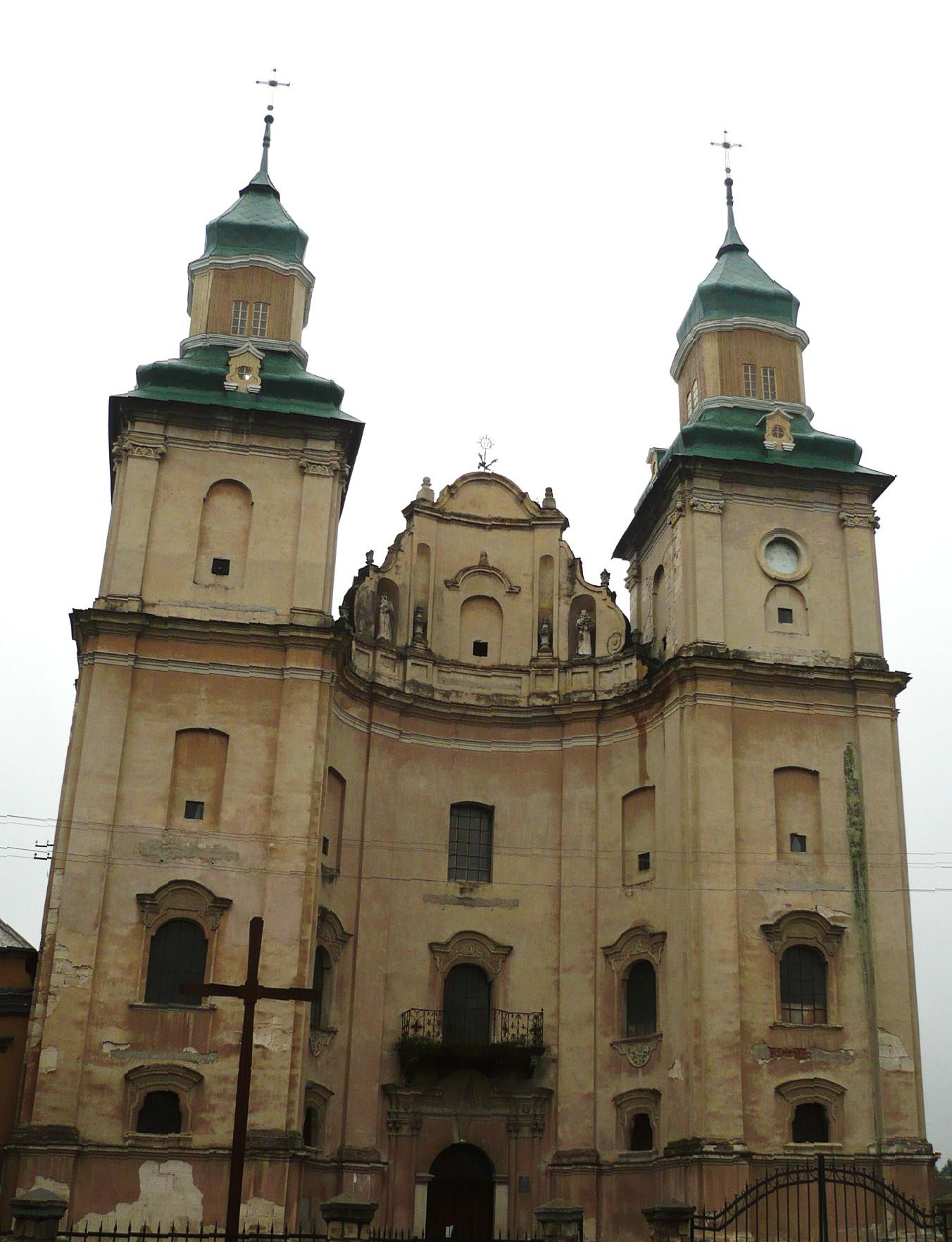
Bernardine Church

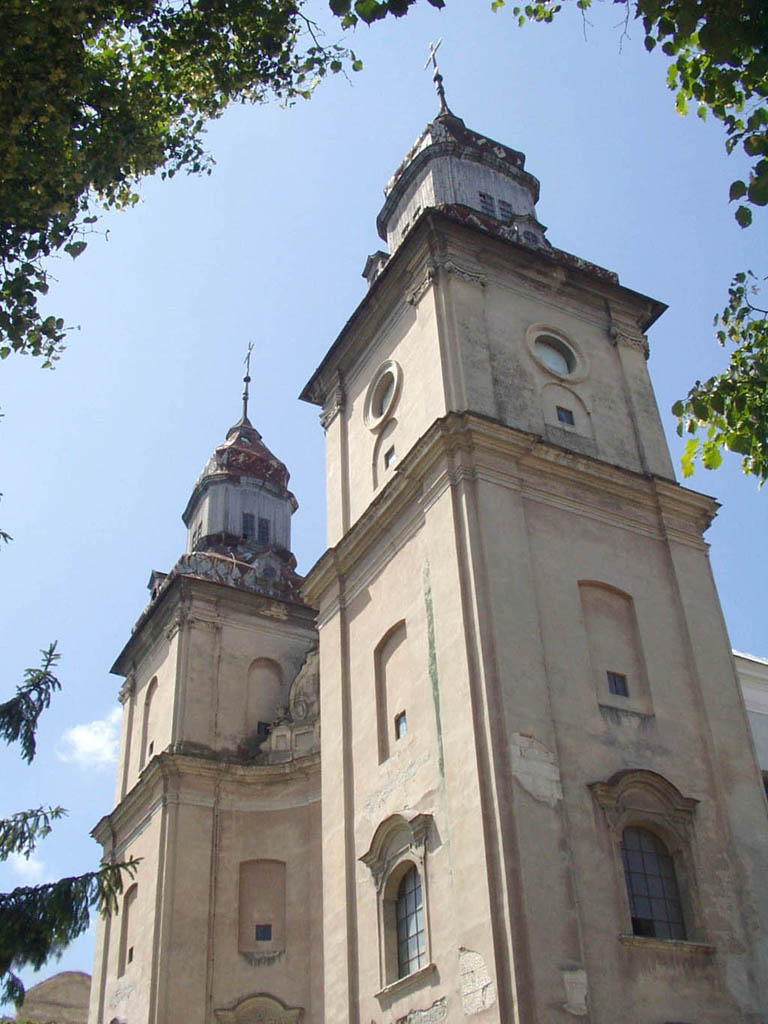
Saint Anthony of Padua Church of the Bernardine Monastery

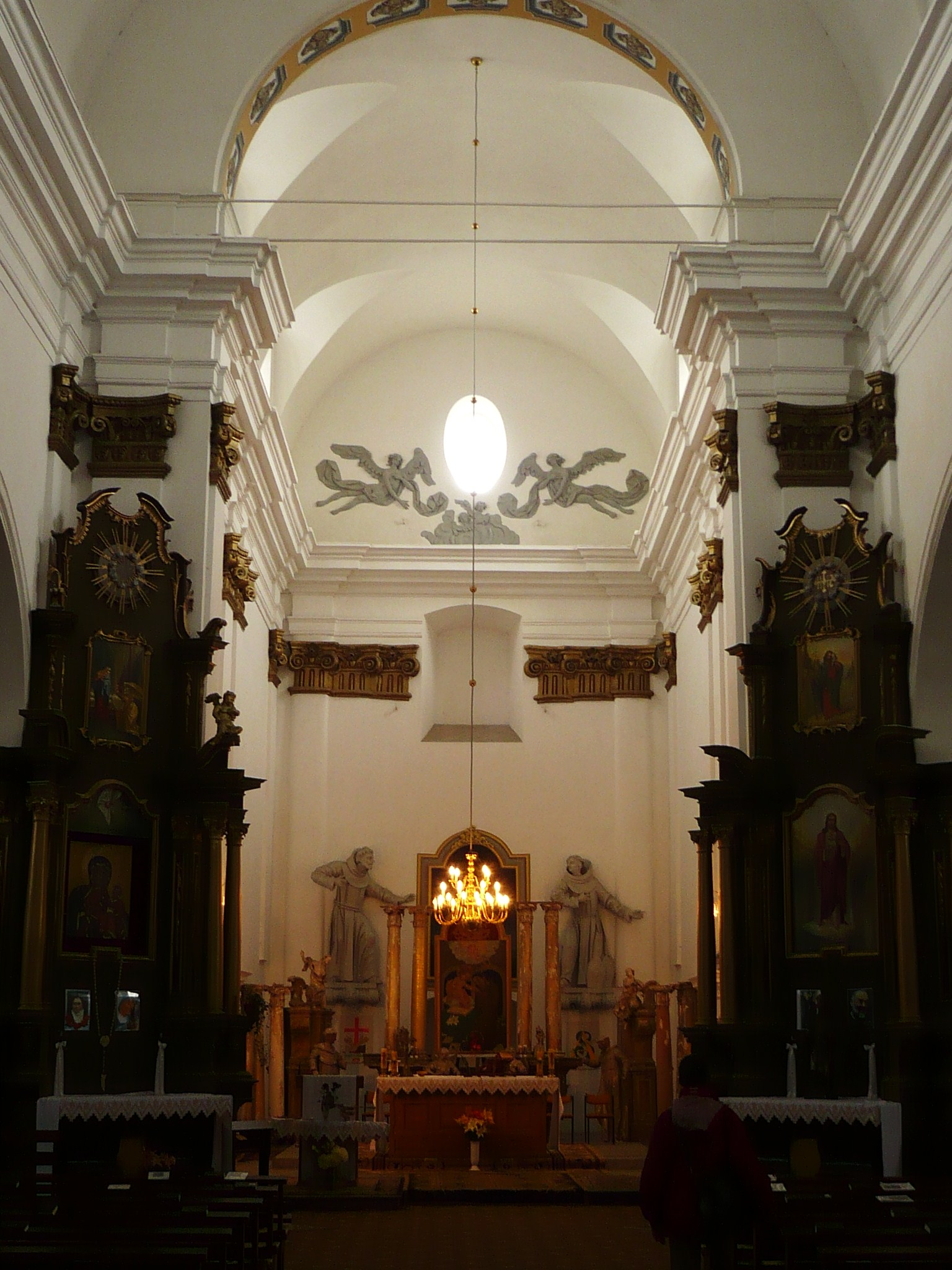
The interior of the Bernardine Church

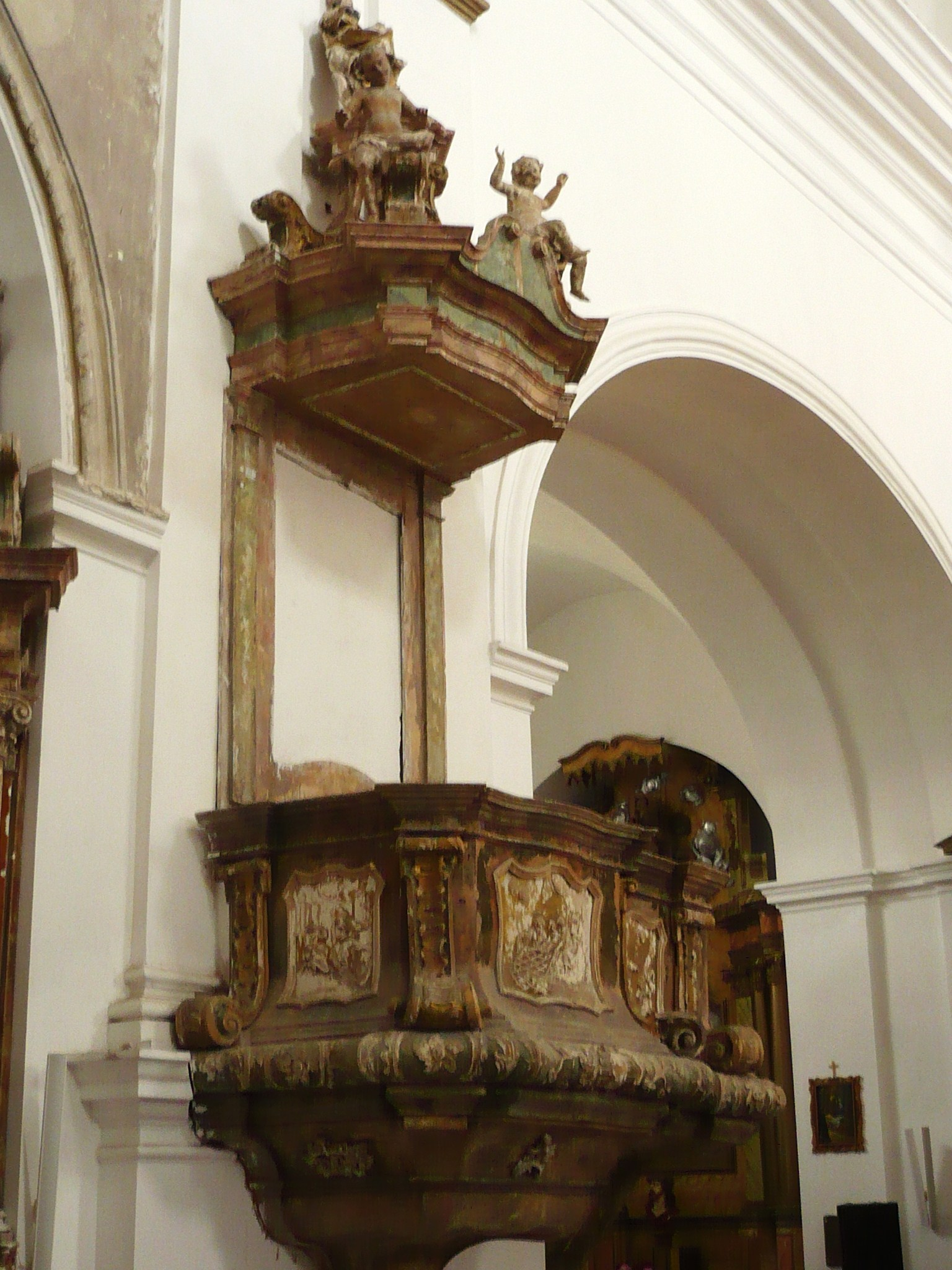
Pulpit in the Bernardine Church

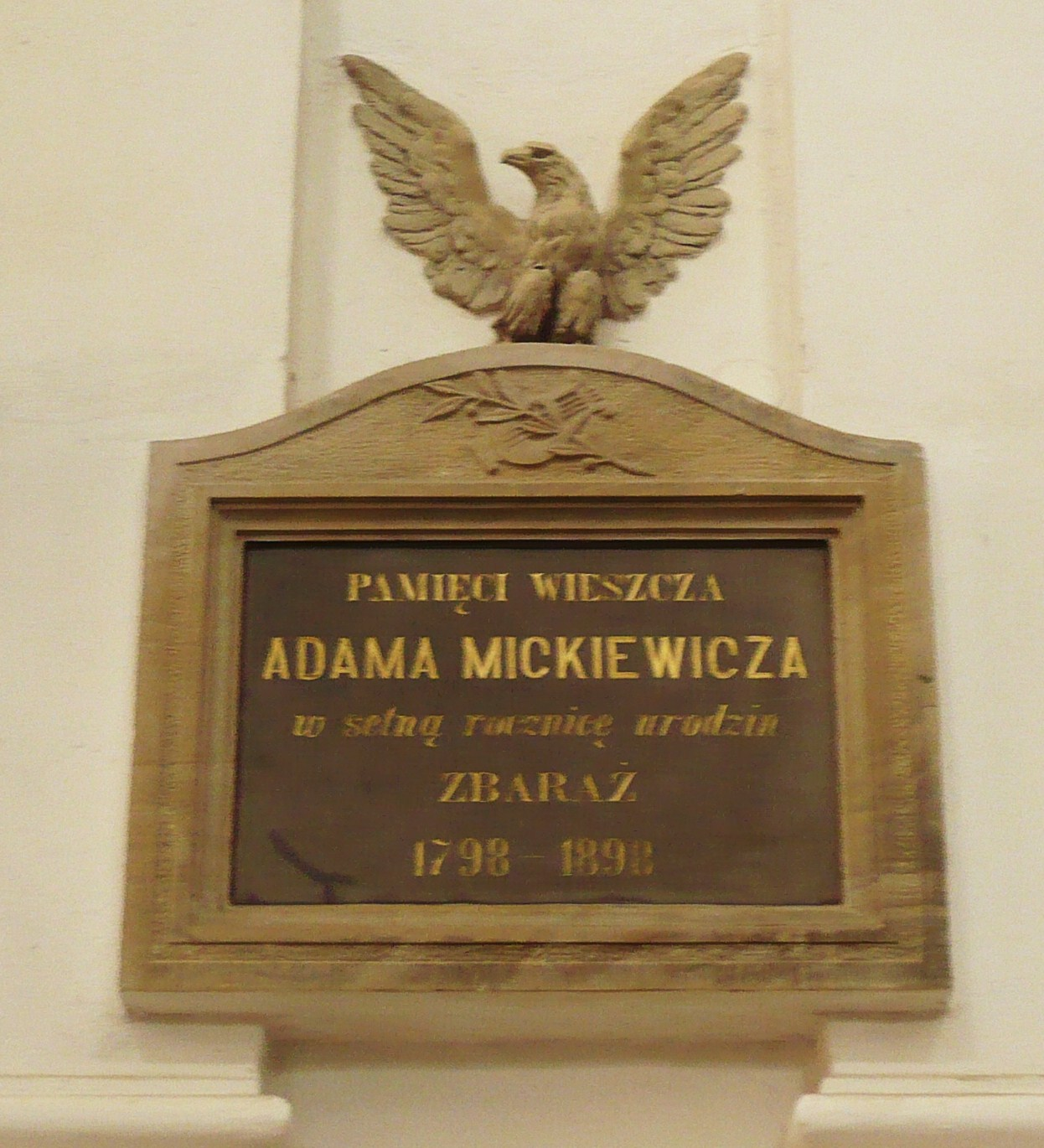
Mickiewicz plaque in the church

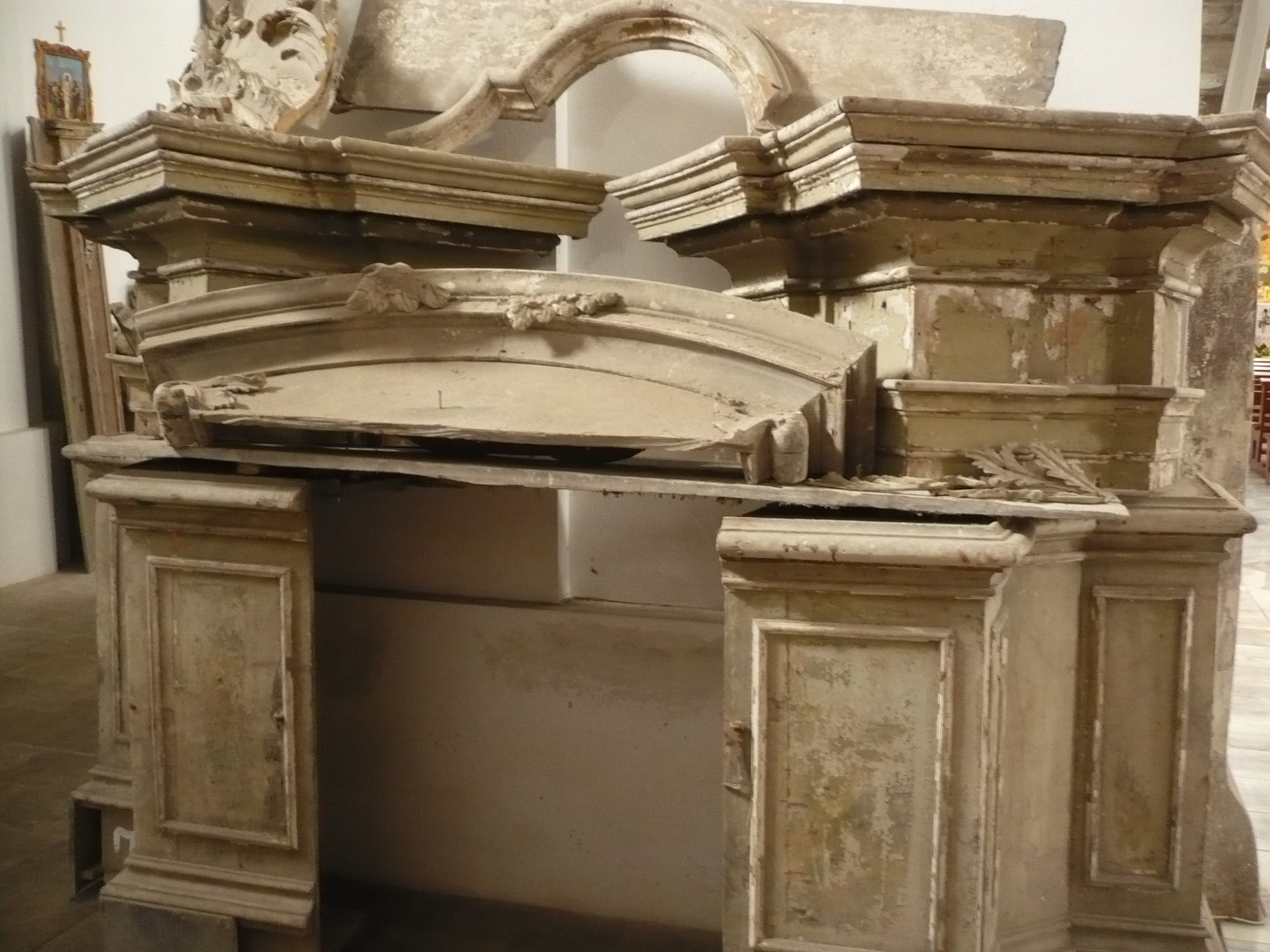
Fragments of the altar

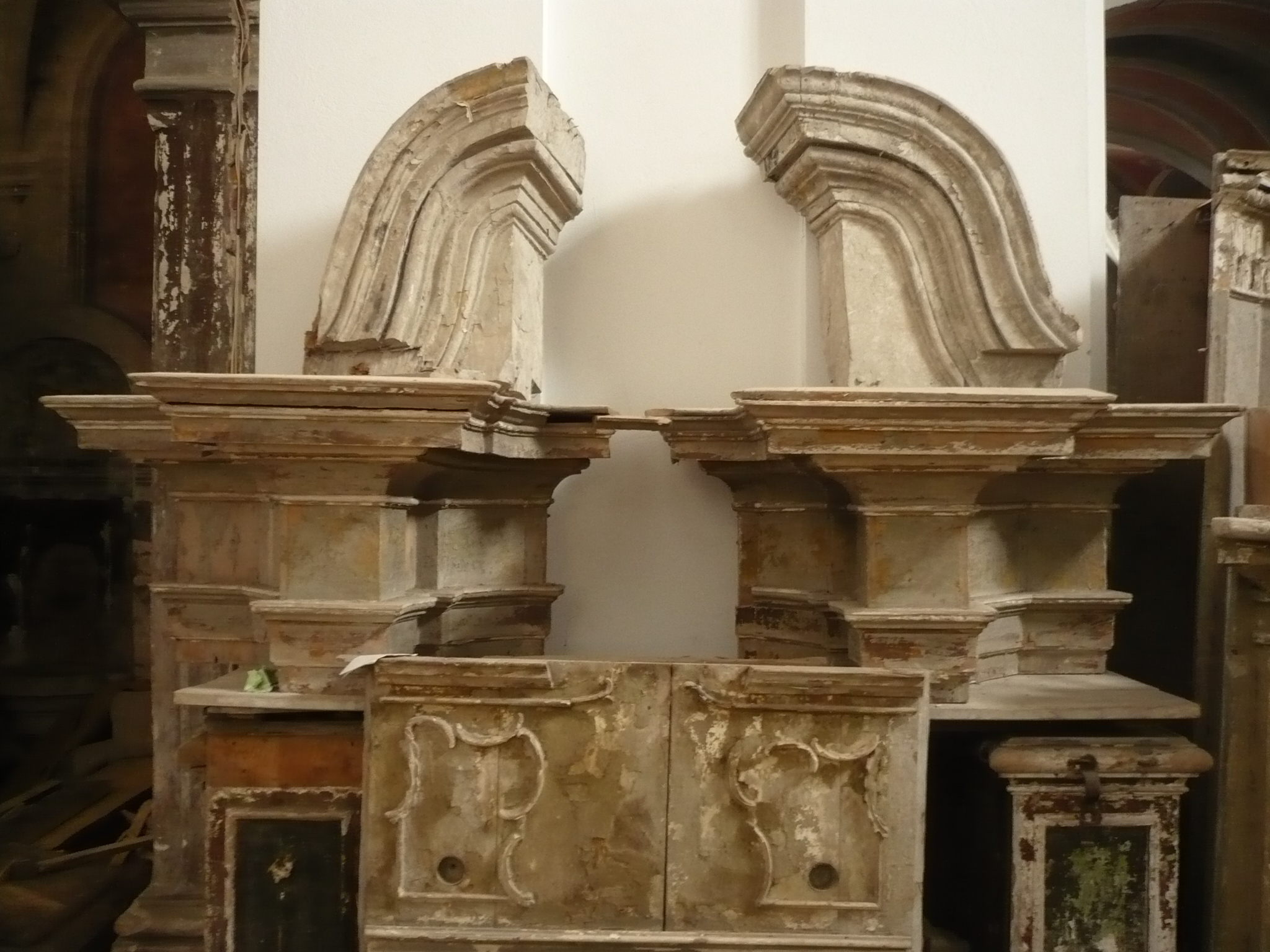
Fragments of the altar

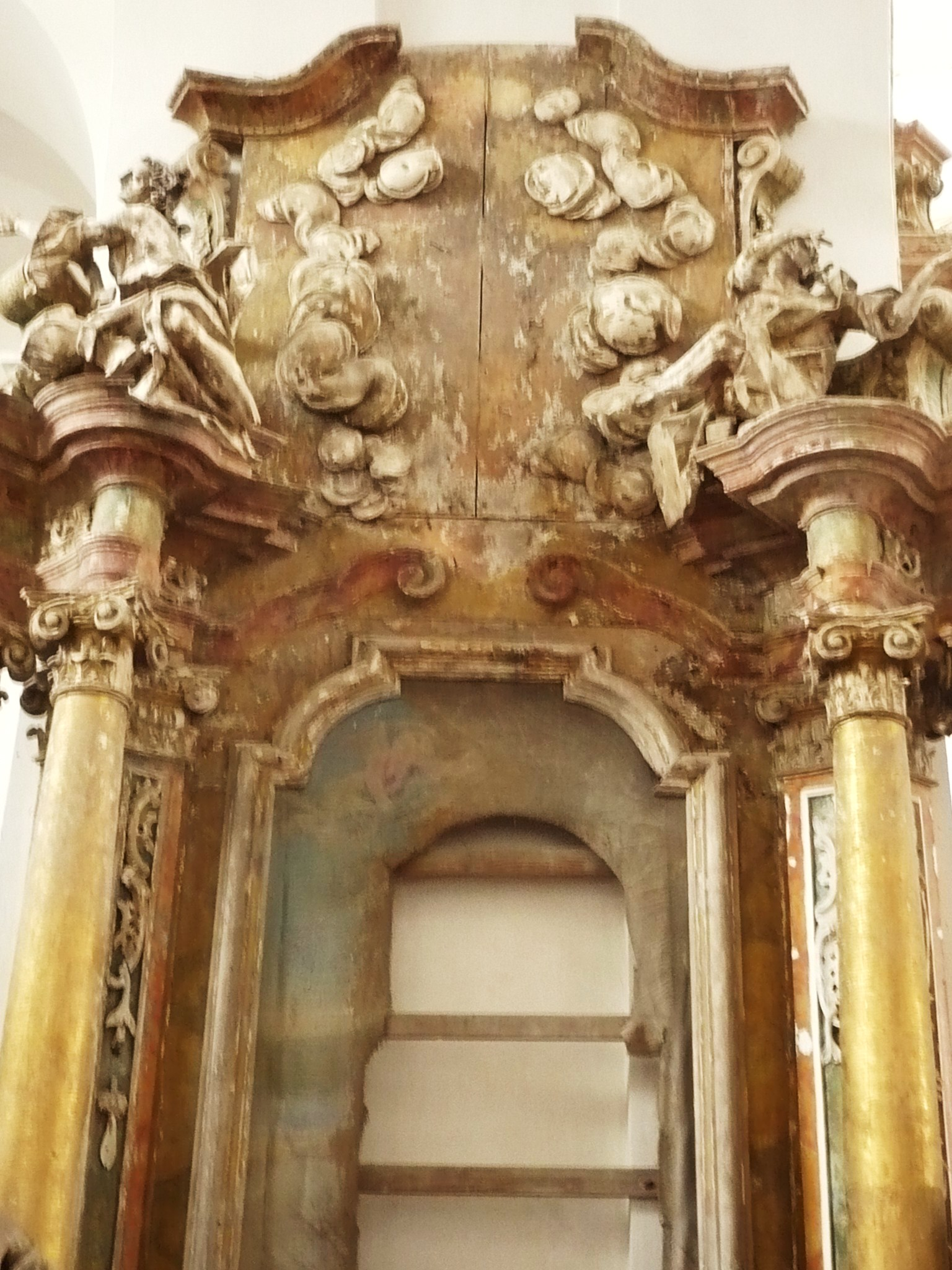
Fragments of the altar
