= Myron Korduba =

Ukrainian historian

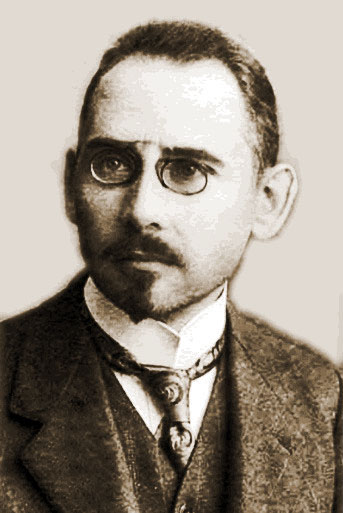
- Born: March 2, 1876; Ostrów, Tarnopol, Austria-Hungary
- Died: May 2, 1947 (aged 71); Lviv, Ukrainian SSR
- Occupation: Professor of the history of Ukraine at Warsaw University
- Known for: Ukrainian historian

Myron Korduba (Ukrainian: Мирон Михайлович Кордуба, March 2, 1876 – May 2, 1947) was a Ukrainian historian, professor of the history of Ukraine at the Warsaw University Faculty of Humanities in 1929-1939; and author of biographies of famous Ukrainians in the Polish Biographical Dictionary (PSB).

== World War II ==
After the invasion of Poland by Nazi Germany and the Soviet Union in 1939 Korduba remained within the German zone of occupation. After the closing of Warsaw University by German occupation authorities and the liquidation of the Ukrainian Scientific Institute of Warsaw, Korduba moved in 1940 to Chełm, where he taught history in the Ukrainian gymnasium. After the German attack in 1941 on the Soviet positions in eastern Poland during Operation Barbarossa, in December 1941 Korduba moved to occupied Lviv where he worked in the library of the Shevchenko Scientific Society, and taught at a Ukrainian high school.

After the occupation of Lviv by the Red Army in July 1944, on August 7, 1944 Korduba was appointed by the Soviet authorities the acting professor of history at the University of Lviv in the Ukrainian SSR, and in September 1945 the chair of its department of history of Southern and Western Slavs.
