= Taras Yuryk =

Ukrainian politician

- Тарас Юрик
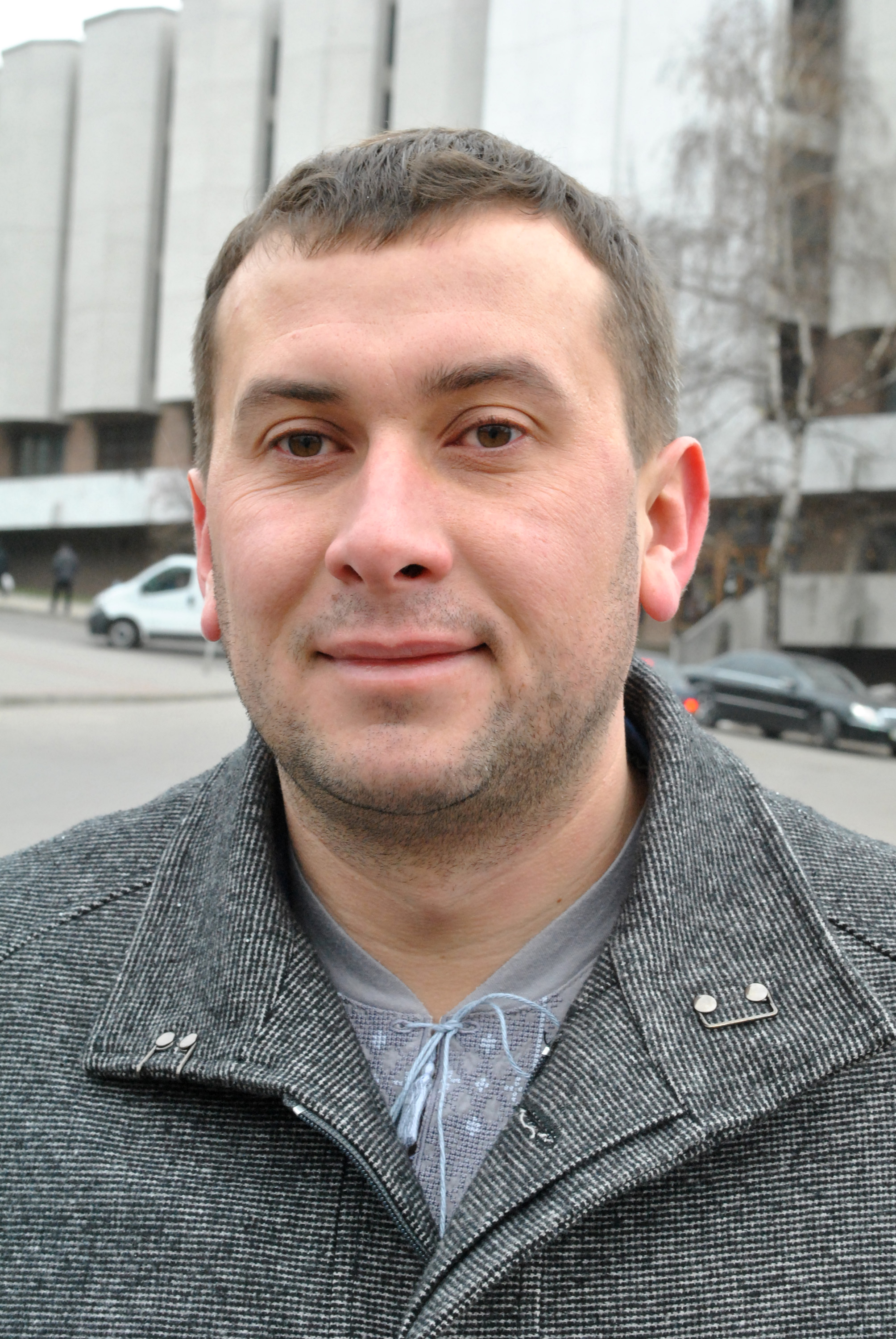

People's Deputy of Ukraine
- In office 27 November 2014 – 29 August 2019
- Preceded by: Volodymyr Boiko
- Succeeded by: Ivan Chaikivskyi
- Constituency: Ternopil Oblast, No. 165

Personal details
- Born: 9 December 1980 (age 45) Kobyllia, Ukrainian SSR, Soviet Union (now Ukraine)
- Party: Petro Poroshenko Bloc
- Education: West Ukrainian National University

Taras Zinoviiovych Yuryk (Ukrainian: Тарас Зіновійович Юрик; born 9 December 1980) is a Ukrainian politician who served as a People's Deputy of Ukraine from Ukraine's 165th electoral district in Ternopil Oblast from 2014 to 2019. He represented the Petro Poroshenko Bloc while in office. He was a Member of the MDO "Deputy Control".

== Early life and career ==
Taras Yuryk was born on 9 December 1980.

Between 2001 and 2002, he was the head of the legal department of "Bolear MED" in Ternopil.

In 2002, he graduated from the Ternopil Academy of National Economy (now West Ukrainian National University).

From 2002 to 2003, he was a legal advisor of the Ternopil branch of JSC "Ukrinbank", and from 2003 to 2004, he was a senior legal advisor.

In February to May 2005, he was the acting head of the legal department of the Ternopil branch of TAS-Komertsbank JSC. Until 2006, he was the head of the legal department.

Since 2005, he is a member and co-founder of the Ternopil Regional Organization "Regional Investment Research Fund".

From 2006 to 2010, he was the head of the Ternopil branch of JSC "Transbank", Western regional branch.

From 2010 to 2011, he was deputy director of the Western Regional Directorate (head of the Ternopil branch) of Evrogazbank JSC.

In 2014, he was a member of the supervisory board of Protection Group LLC.

== Political career ==
During the 2014 Ukrainian parliamentary election Yuryk ran as the Petro Poroshenko Bloc candidate for People's Deputy of Ukraine representing Ukraine's 165th electoral district, located in Ternopil Oblast. He was successfully elected.

On 29 December 2014, the draft law No. 1677 "On Amendments to the Law of Ukraine "On Copyright and Related Rights" (regarding freedom of panorama)" was registered in the Verkhovna Rada (parliament of Ukraine) after being submitted by Yuryk. The developer of the project is the NGO "Wikimedia Ukraine"

He was a member of the supervisory board of Ternopil National Medical University.

Since February 2017, he is the head of the Ternopil Oblast Football Federation.

== Personal life ==
His wife is Maryana Tomyak, who is a journalist of the INTB TV channel.
