= Ostriv, Ternopil Oblast =

Rural locality in Ternopil Oblast, Ukraine

Ostriv Острів
- Location in Ternopil Oblast
- Coordinates: 49°29′15″N 25°34′51″E
- Country: Ukraine
- Oblast: Ternopil Oblast
- Raion: Ternopil Raion
- Hromada: Velyka Berezovytsia settlement hromada
- Time zone: UTC+2 (EET)
  - Summer (DST): UTC+3 (EEST)
- Postal code: 47728

Ostriv (Ukrainian: Острів) is a village in Velyka Berezovytsia settlement hromada, Ternopil Raion, Ternopil Oblast, Ukraine.

== History ==
The first written mention of the village was in 1581.

== Religion ==
- St. Michael's church (1878–1881, brick, painted by Kornylo Ustyianovych; damaged during World War I, rebuilt in 1935).

== Famous people ==
- Myron Korduba (1876–1947), Ukrainian historian, professor of the history of Ukraine at the Warsaw University Faculty of Humanities in 1929–1939; and author of biographies of famous Ukrainians in the Polish Biographical Dictionary (PSB)
- Dmytro Pidruchnyi (born 1991), Ukrainian biathlete

== Sources ==
- (in Ukrainian) Мельничук Б., Уніят В., Шикірява О., Острів // Ternopil Encyclopedic Dictionary: in 4 v. / editorial board: H. Yavorskyi and other, Ternopil: "Zbruch", 2005, V. 2: К—О, S. 695—696. — ISBN 966-528-199-2.
- "Ostrów (20)". Geographical Dictionary of the Kingdom of Poland (in Polish). 7. Warszawa: Kasa im. Józefa Mianowskiego. 1886. p. 707.

— S. 707–708.
