= Kobyllia =

Rural locality in Ternopil Oblast, Ukraine

Kobyllia Кобилля
- Location in Ternopil Oblast
- Coordinates: 49°46′31″N 25°36′34″E
- Country: Ukraine
- Oblast: Ternopil Oblast
- Raion: Ternopil Raion
- Hromada: Zbarazh Hromada
- Time zone: UTC+2 (EET)
  - Summer (DST): UTC+3 (EEST)
- Postal code: 47334

Kobyllia (Ukrainian: Кобилля) is a village in Zbarazh urban hromada, Ternopil Raion, Ternopil Oblast, Ukraine.

== History ==
The first written mention is from 1545.

== Religion ==
- Saint George church (1890, brick; built on the site of a wooden one)

== Notable residents ==
- Vasyl Ilchyshyn (born 1982), Ukrainian archaeologist, historian, scientist, and teacher
- Taras Yuryk (born 1980), Ukrainian politician who had served as a Member of Parliament in the Verkhovna Rada of the 8th convocation
