= Dmytro Pidruchnyi =

Ukrainian biathlete (born 1991)

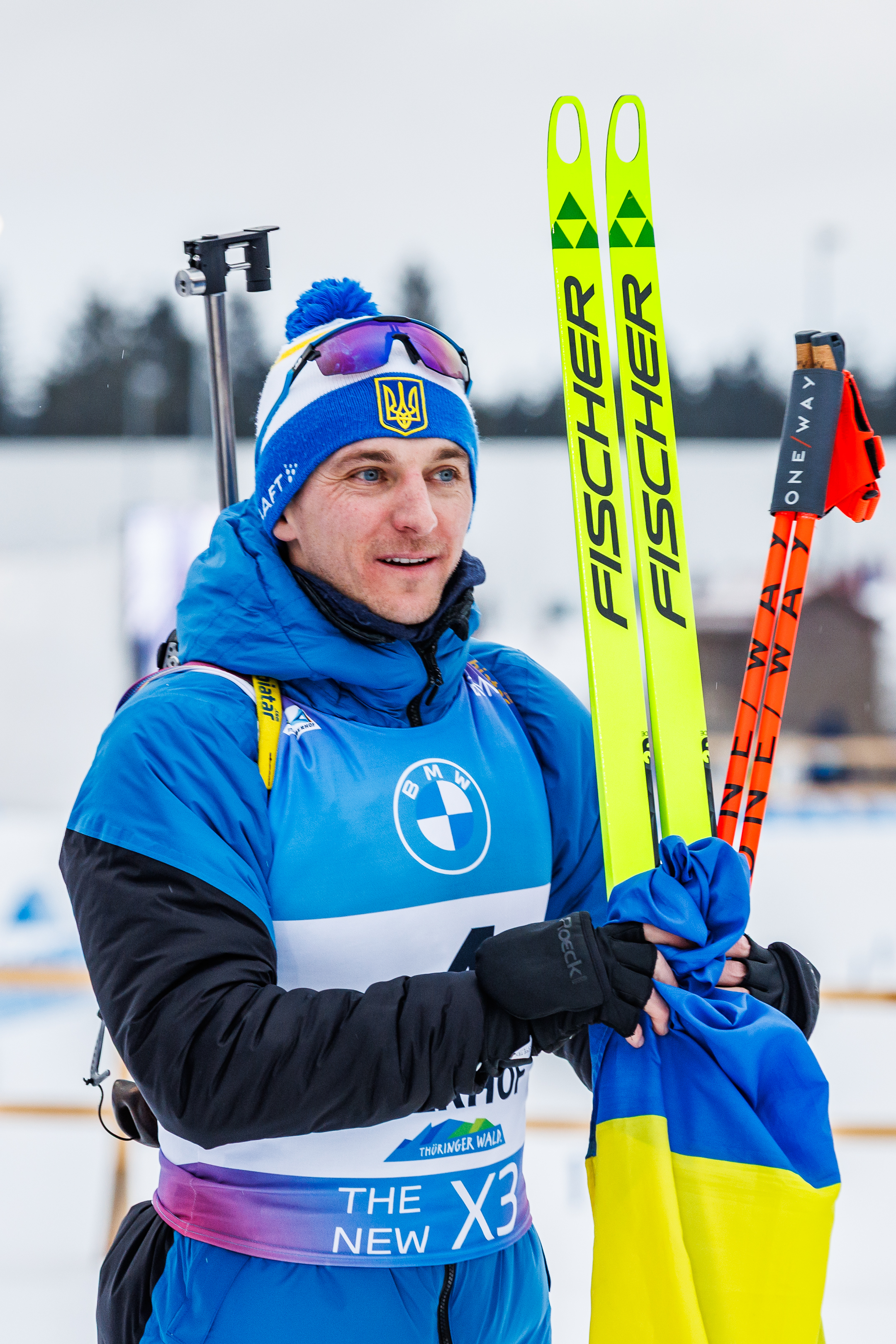
- Dmytro Pidruchnyi (2025)

Personal information
- Full name: Dmytro Volodymyrovych Pidruchnyi
- Born: 5 November 1991 (age 34) Ostriv, Ternopil Oblast, Ukraine
- Height: 1.78 m (5 ft 10 in)
- Weight: 68 kg (150 lb)

Sport

Professional information
- Sport: Biathlon
- Club: Kolos, Dynamo
- World Cup debut: 2012

Olympic Games
- Teams: 4 (2014, 2018, 2022, 2026)
- Medals: 0

World Championships
- Teams: 5 (2015–2020)
- Medals: 1 (1 gold)

World Cup
- Seasons: 2012–
Medal record
Men's biathlon
Representing Ukraine
World Championships
Gold medal – first place	2019 Östersund	12.5 km pursuit
European Championships
Gold medal – first place	2015 Otepää	Relay
Gold medal – first place	2018 Ridnaun	Mixed relay
Gold medal – first place	2020 Raubichi	Mixed relay
Bronze medal – third place	2020 Raubichi	Super sprint
Universiade
Gold medal – first place	2013 Trentino	Mass start
Silver medal – second place	2013 Trentino	Mixed relay
Bronze medal – third place	2013 Trentino	Sprint
Men's summer biathlon
World Championships
Gold medal – first place	2024 Otepää	7.5 km super sprint
Silver medal – second place	2016 Otepää	Mixed relay
- Updated on 25 February 2020

Dmytro Pidruchnyi (Ukrainian: Дмитро Підручний; born 5 November 1991) is a Ukrainian biathlete. He participated at 2014, 2018, 2022 and 2026 Winter Olympics. He is 2019 World Champion in pursuit. In March 2022, Pidruchnyi joined the Ukrainian National Guard to fight during the 2022 Russian invasion of Ukraine.

== Career ==
Pidruchnyi was born in village Ostriv near Ternopil. (Note: For these reasons sometimes Ternopil is wrongly indicated as his birth place.) Dmytro's first international competition was 2010 Junior World Championships in Swedish Torsby. He didn't have much success then. He also wasn't very successful next season. But at 2012 Junior Worlds in Kontiolahti he finally showed good results which allowed him to start in IBU Cup and debut in World Cup. On 13 December 2012, he was with 6 misses just 98th in Pokljuka, Slovenia. Nevertheless he competed some more sprints that season.

His performances improved in 2013–14 season. In Hochfilzen Dmytro had surprising 6th place in sprint. Since then Pidruchnyi is on a regular basis in national team. He participated at 2014 Winter Olympics in Sochi, Russia. He was just 55th in individual race and 9th in men's relay.

On 6 February 2015, Pidruchnyi had his first team podium in mixed relay in Nové Město. That year he debuted at World Championships. Up to date his best World Cup finish is 4th in mass start in Ruhpolding where he lost bronze to Norway's Tarjei Bø.

He qualified to represent Ukraine at the 2018 Winter Olympics. In Pyeongchang he was 21st in sprint, 34th in pursuit, 7th in mixed relay and 9th in relay.

He won pursuit at World Championships 2019 in Östersund, Sweden.

== Biathlon results ==
All results are sourced from the International Biathlon Union.

=== Olympic Games ===
0 medals

Event	Individual	Sprint	Pursuit	Mass start	Relay	Mixed relay
(Russia) 2014 Sochi	55th	—	—	—	9th	—
(South Korea) 2018 Pyeongchang	21st	34th	—	—	9th	7th
(China) 2022 Beijing	18th	13th	13th	24th	9th	13th
(Italy) 2026 Milano Cortina	18th	27th	20th	17th	16th	8th

=== World Championships ===
1 medal (1 gold)

Event	Individual	Sprint	Pursuit	Mass start	Relay	Mixed relay	Single mixed relay
(Finland) 2015 Kontiolahti	—	49th	43rd	—	9th	11th	—N/a
(Norway) 2016 Oslo Holmenkollen	—	44th	—	—	16th	4th	—N/a
(Austria) 2017 Hochfilzen	41st	28th	14th	25th	6th	5th	—N/a
(Sweden) 2019 Östersund	—	4th	Gold	10th	—	7th	5th
(Italy) 2020 Antholz	—	10th	30th	23rd	12th	5th	10th
(Slovenia) 2021 Pokljuka	66th	22nd	27th	—	5th	4th	—
(Germany) 2023 Oberhof	—	5th	8th	23rd	13th	10th	15th
(Czech Republic) 2024 Nové Město na Moravě	—	21st	23rd	27th	13th	7th	14th
(Switzerland) 2025 Lenzerheide	—	37th	30th	30th	8th	8th	—

*During Olympic seasons competitions are only held for those events not included in the Olympic program.
**The single mixed relay was added as an event in 2019.

=== World Cup ===
==== Relay podiums ====
Season	Place	Competition	Placement
2014–15	Nové Město, Czech Republic	Mixed relay	3
2016–17	Kontiolahti, Finland	Mixed relay	3
2017–18	Kontiolahti, Finland	Mixed relay	2
2019–20	Nové Město, Czech Republic	Relay	2
2024–25	Nové Město, Czech Republic	Relay	3

==== Rankings ====
Season	Age	Overall		Individual		Sprint		Pursuit		Mass start	
Season	Age	Points	Position	Points	Position	Points	Position	Points	Position	Points	Position
2013–14	22	124	48th	0	–	58	44th	46	48th	20	36th
2014–15	23	137	44th	0	–	90	39th	47	42nd	0	—
2015–16	24	232	37th	0	–	80	40th	85	34th	67	26th
2016–17	25	362	27th	0	–	140	21st	144	25th	78	25th
2017–18	26	149	37th	0	–	80	29th	69	30th	0	—
2018–19	27	425	18th	0	–	153	20th	181	15th	91	20th
2019–20	28	366	17th	32	30th	145	16th	82	19th	107	15th
2020–21	29	297	25th	—	—	137	24th	114	24th	43	27th
2021–22	30	148	37th	13	44th	97	28th	38	45th	—	—
2022–23	31	9	86th	—	—	9	72nd	—	—	—	—
2023–24	32	131	38th	11	54th	57	35th	53	33rd	10	40th
2024–25	33	409	19th	31	33rd	153	17th	120	18th	105	17th

=== IBU Cup ===
==== Podiums ====
Season	Place	Competition	Placement
2022–23	Obertilliach, Austria	Sprint	3
