= Marianivka, Ternopil Oblast =

Rural locality in Ternopil Oblast, Ukraine

Marianivka Мар'янівка
- Location in Ternopil Oblast
- Coordinates: 49°27′0″N 25°26′39″E
- Country: Ukraine
- Oblast: Ternopil Oblast
- Raion: Ternopil Raion
- Hromada: Velyka Berezovytsia settlement hromada
- Time zone: UTC+2 (EET)
  - Summer (DST): UTC+3 (EEST)
- Postal code: 47735

Marianivka (Ukrainian: Мар'янівка) is a village in Velyka Berezovytsia settlement hromada, Ternopil Raion, Ternopil Oblast, Ukraine.

== History ==
The first written mention of the village was in 1785.

== Religion ==
- Church of the Blessed Virgin Mary (1893, brick) and the Church of the Nativity of the Blessed Virgin Mary (2004).

== Sources ==
- (in Ukrainian) Пиндус Б., Яремцьо З., Мар'янівка // Ternopil Encyclopedic Dictionary: in 4 v. / editorial board: H. Yavorskyi and other, Ternopil: "Zbruch", 2005, V. 2: К—О, S. 470. — ISBN 966-528-199-2.
