= Velyka Berezovytsia settlement hromada =

Hromada in Ternopil Oblast, Ukraine

Velyka Berezovytsia settlement hromada Великоберезовицька селищна громада
- hromada
- Location within Ternopil Oblast Location within Ukraine
- Coordinates: 49°29′47″N 25°36′32″E
- Country: Ukraine
- Oblast: Ternopil Oblast
- Raion: Ternopil Raion
- Administrative center: Velyka Berezovytsia

Government
  - Hromada head: Andrii Halaiko

Area
  - Total: 205.0 km^{2} (79.2 sq mi)

Population (2022)
  - Total: 23,086
- Urban-type settlement: 1
- Villages: 12
- Website: vbsr.gov.ua

Velyka Berezovytsia settlement hromada (Ukrainian: Великоберезовицька селищна територіальна громада, romanized: Velykoberezovytska selyshchna terytorialna hromada is a hromada in Ukraine, in Ternopil Raion of Ternopil Oblast. The administrative center is the urban-type settlement of Velyka Berezovytsia. Its population is 23,086 (2022 estimate)

== Settlements ==
The community consists of 1 urban-type settlement (Velyka Berezovytsia) and 12 villages:

- Butsniv
- Velyka Luka
- Yosypivka
- Luchka
- Marianivka
- Myroliubivka
- Myshkovychi
- Nastasiv
- Ostriv
- Petrykiv
- Seredynky
- Khatky
