= Myroliubivka, Ternopil Oblast =

Rural locality in Ternopil Oblast, Ukraine

Myroliubivka Миролюбівка
- Location in Ternopil Oblast
- Coordinates: 49°25′41″N 25°35′13″E
- Country: Ukraine
- Oblast: Ternopil Oblast
- Raion: Ternopil Raion
- Hromada: Velyka Berezovytsia settlement hromada
- Time zone: UTC+2 (EET)
  - Summer (DST): UTC+3 (EEST)
- Postal code: 47512

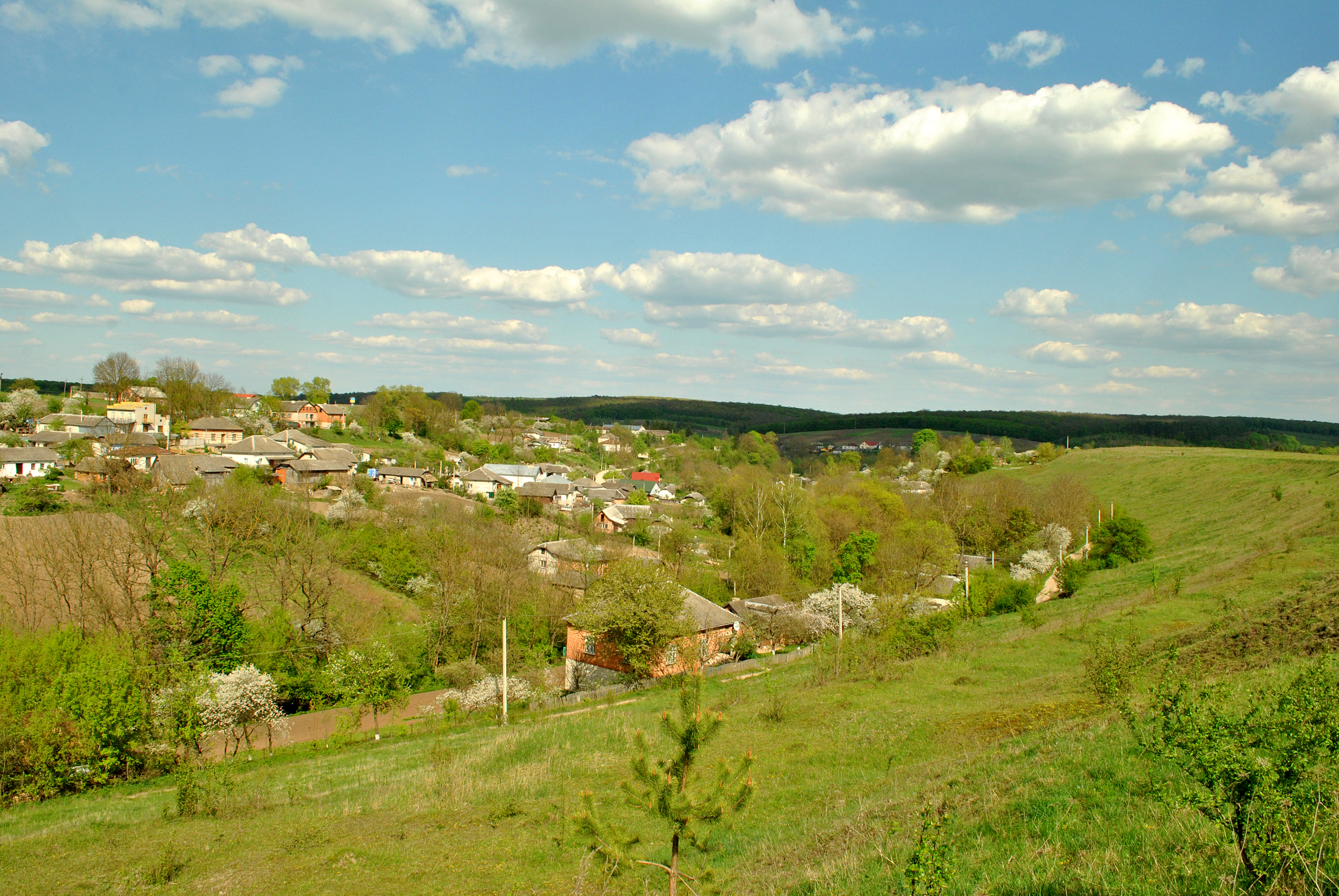
Landscapes of Myrolyubivka, Ternopil district, Ternopil region.

Myroliubivka (Ukrainian: Миролюбівка; until 1946, Chortoryia) is a village in Velyka Berezovytsia settlement hromada, Ternopil Raion, Ternopil Oblast, Ukraine.

== History ==
The first written mention of the village was in 1566.

== Religion ==
- Church of St. Demetrius of Thessalonica (1912, brick).

== Sources ==
- (in Ukrainian) Гаврилюк О., Мельничук Б., Миролюбівка // Ternopil Encyclopedic Dictionary: in 4 v. / editorial board: H. Yavorskyi and other, Ternopil: "Zbruch", 2005, V. 2: К—О, S. 516. — ISBN 966-528-199-2.
- "Czartoryja (2), wś, pow. tarnopolski". Geographical Dictionary of the Kingdom of Poland (in Polish). 1. Warszawa: Kasa im. Józefa Mianowskiego. 1880. p. 773.
