= Velyka Berezovytsia =

Rural locality in Ternopil Oblast, Ukraine

Velyka Berezovytsia Велика Березовиця
- Rural settlement
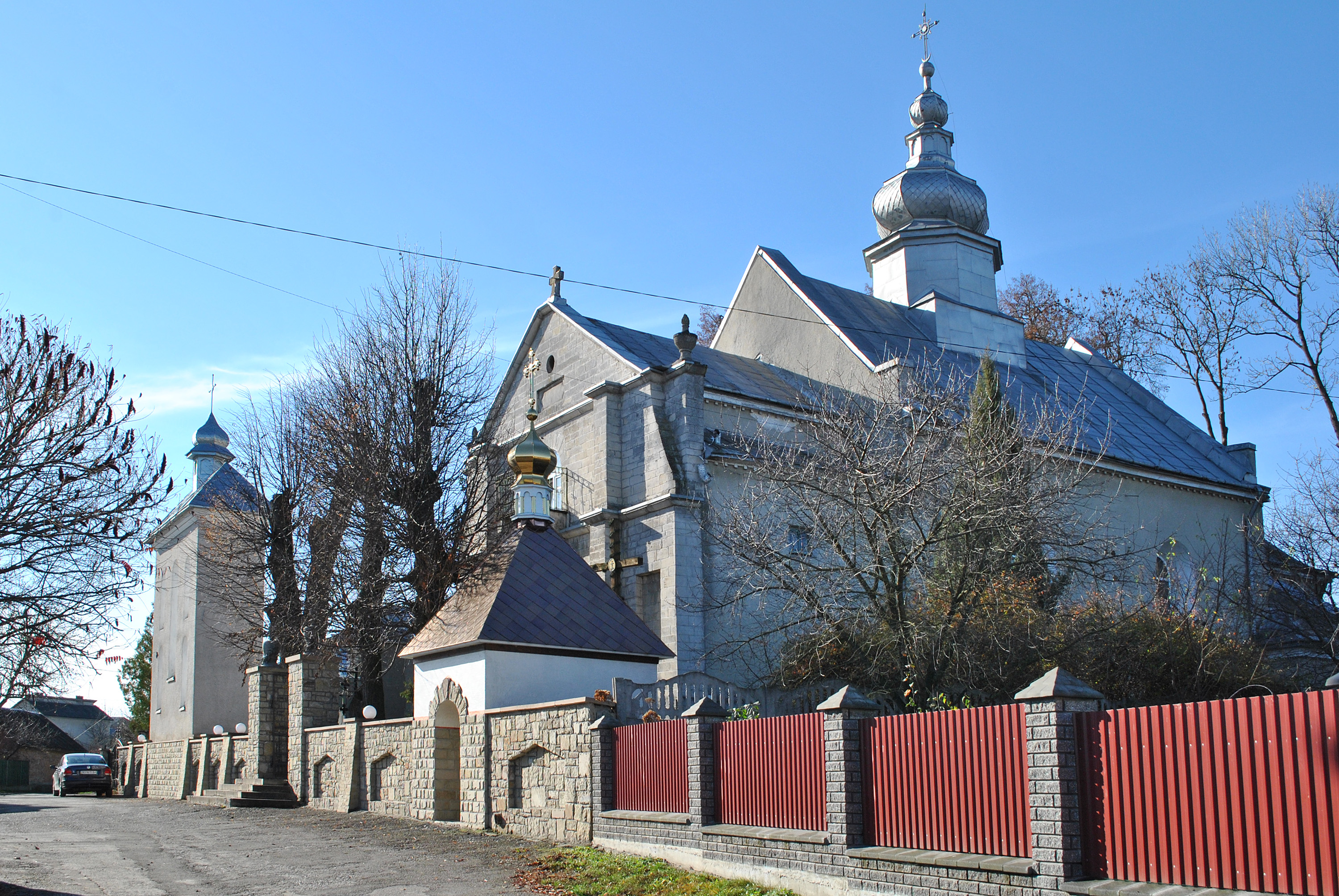
- Church

- Location of Velyka Berezovytsia in Ternopil Oblast Location of Velyka Berezovytsia in Ukraine
- Coordinates: 49°29′47″N 25°36′31″E
- Country: Ukraine
- Oblast: Ternopil Oblast
- Raion: Ternopil Raion
- Founded: 1474
- Town status: 1986

Government
  - Town Head: Mariya Kalynka

Area
  - Total: 24 km^{2} (9.3 sq mi)
- Elevation: 305 m (1,001 ft)

Population (2001)
  - Total: 6,503
  - Density: 270/km^{2} (700/sq mi)
- Time zone: UTC+2 (EET)
  - Summer (DST): UTC+3 (EEST)
- Postal code: 47724
- Area code: +380 352
- Website: http://rada.gov.ua/

Velyka Berezovytsia (Ukrainian: Велика Березовиця) is a rural settlement in Ternopil Raion, Ternopil Oblast, western Ukraine. Its population is 6,503 as of the 2001 Ukrainian Census. Velyka Berezovytsia was first founded in 1474, and it acquired the status of an urban-type settlement in 1986. It hosts the administration of Velyka Berezovytsia settlement hromada, one of the hromadas of Ukraine. It has a population of 8,592 (2022 estimate).

== History ==
Until 26 January 2024, Velyka Berezovytsia was designated urban-type settlement. On this day, a new law entered into force which abolished this status, and Velyka Berezovytsia became a rural settlement.
