= Oleh Holovchak =

Ukrainian architect

Oleh Holovchak Олег Головчак
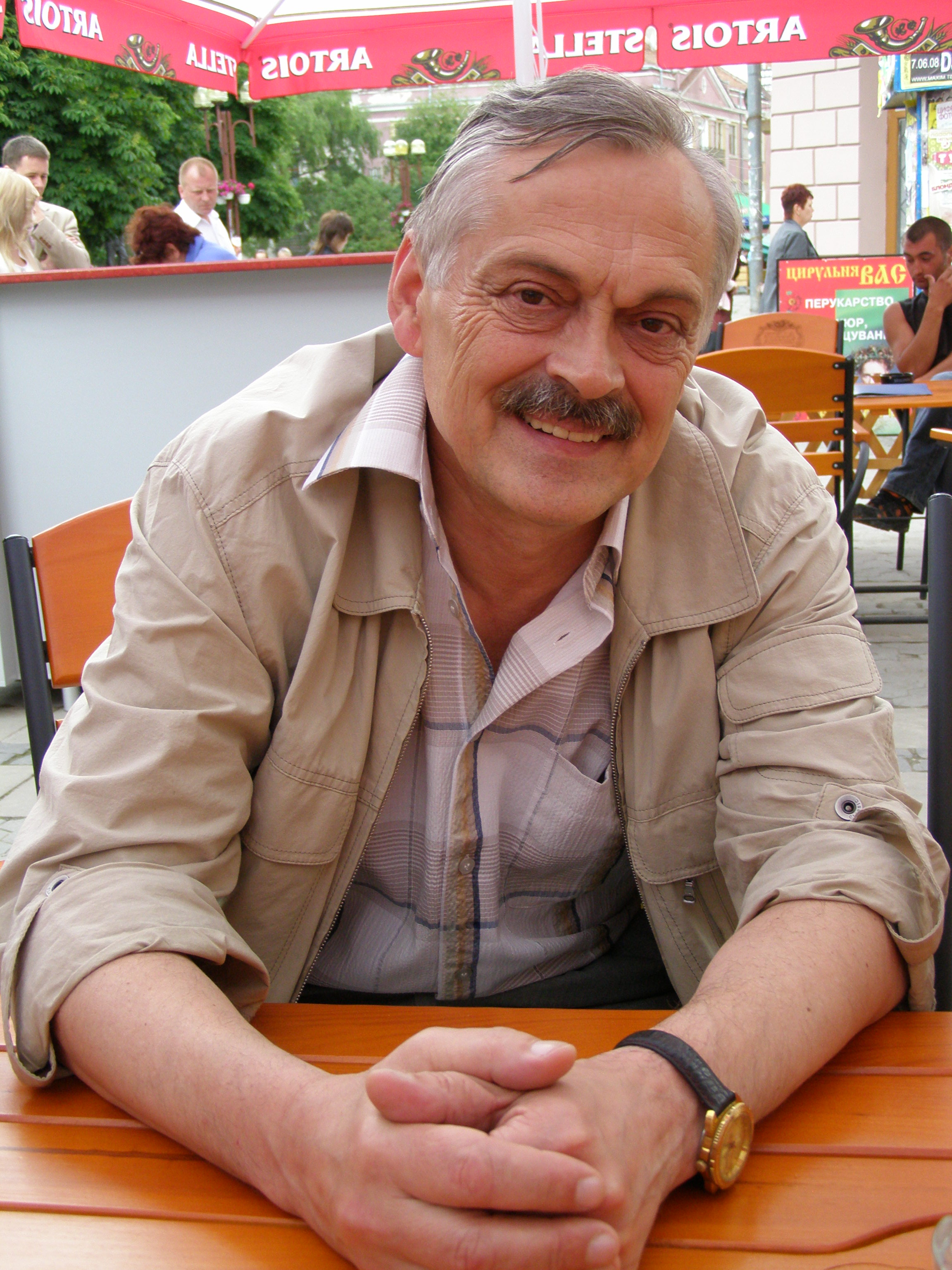
- Born: March 1, 1951; Novychka, Ivano-Frankivsk Oblast, USSR (now Ukraine)
- Occupation: Architect
- Buildings: Ternopil Regional Museum; Ternopil Oblast Universal Scientific Library

Oleh Ivanovych Holovchak (Ukrainian: Олег Іванович Головчак, romanized: Oleh Ivanovych Holovchak; born 1 March 1951) is a Ukrainian architect. He is a member of the National Architect's Union of Ukraine since 1978. He designs housing, civilian and religious construction.

== Biography ==
Oleg Holovchak was born in the village of Novychka, Ivano-Frankivsk oblast. Family circumstances (among other things) highly contributed to Oleh's choosing of the career after school: his brother Volodymyr is a civil engineer, brother Petro is a painter, brother Jaroslaw also is an architect.

He graduated from the Department of Architecture of Lviv Polytechnic Institute in 1974, immediately after which he moved to work in Ternopil. He started his career in the Ternopil branch of the "Dniprotsyvilprombud" institute and became the director of the Architectural Group in 1983.

Holovchak worked as the chief architect of the project at JSC "Terno-Kors" and is now the Chief Architect of the Ternopil collective creative production company "Ternopilarhproekt".

In 1981 he was elected a secretary of the Ternopil Oblast branch of the Architect's Union of the USSR and between 1990 and 1999 he headed the Ternopil Oblast branch of the Architect's Union of Ukraine.

Oleg Golovchak said about his profession:

The architect always is a little dreamer, but a dreamer who remembers about reality. We serve for one of the most difficult kinds of art that requires a combination of polar properties - mind of the rational mathematician and passionate soul of the artist.

== Main projects ==
Most of the buildings designed by Oleg Golovchak are located in Ternopil.

In 1977, being a member of the creative team of architects, he worked on the interior of the Palace of Culture "Octyabr" (now it is the Palace of Culture "Berezil" of Les Kurbas). For this work, the creative team were awarded with the certificates of the USSR State Construction Committee.

On December 30, 1982, four-storeyed building of the Ternopil Regional Museum designed by Oleg Golovchak was unveiled. For this work, the architect received a diploma from the IX Republican view of the works of young architects by the Architect's Union of the USSR, which was held in 1985 in Kyiv.

In 1984 a newly built Ternopil Regional Academic Theatre of actors and puppets was opened.

Oleh Holovchak projected an residential complex on the Luchakivskoho street in Ternopil (1987–2003).

The church of St. Josaphat, designed by the architect, was built in 1999–2002 in Ternopil.

In 2000, in the Sichovykh Striltciv street diocesan house of Ternopil-Zboriv Archdiocese was built. The same year, in front of the diocesan house a monument of Andrey Sheptytsky, created in collaboration of Oleg Golovchak and his brother, a painter and sculptor Petro Golovchak, was unveiled. On October, 27 the unveiling event was attended by Cardinal Lubomyr Husar and Bishop of Ternopil-Zboriv Archdiocese Mykhaylo Sabryha.

Another work of the architect is the bell tower of the Assumption of the Blessed Virgin Mary Church in Dolyna.

=== Ternopil Oblast Universal Scientific Library ===
In the early 1980s, Oleg Golovchak drafted a new building of Ternopil Oblast Library. However, the construction, which started in 1986, has not yet been completed due to lack of funds. Initially, it was planned that the building would be completed by the end of 1989. However, construction activities were suspended, they recovered only sporadically. Occasionally a question of changing the destination of the building was on the agenda.

According to Holovchak, if the project was annually allocated at least ₴500,000 since 1991, it would have been already completed. If the current situation is saved, there is a danger of the chaotic development of Square of the Euromaidan Heroes (formerly Square of Arts), where the unfinished library is located. This can significantly spoil the look of the center of Ternopil.

On October 20, 2021, the Cabinet of Ministers issued a decree "On the transfer of an unfinished construction project to the ownership of the Ternopil City Territorial Community," which made the unfinished building of the regional library the property of the Ternopil City Territorial Community.
