= Velyka Luka, Ternopil Oblast =

Rural locality in Ternopil Oblast, Ukraine

Velyka Luka Велика Лука
- Location in Ternopil Oblast
- Coordinates: 49°26′52″N 25°35′17″E
- Country: Ukraine
- Oblast: Ternopil Oblast
- Raion: Ternopil Raion
- Hromada: Velyka Berezovytsia settlement hromada
- Time zone: UTC+2 (EET)
  - Summer (DST): UTC+3 (EEST)
- Postal code: 47732

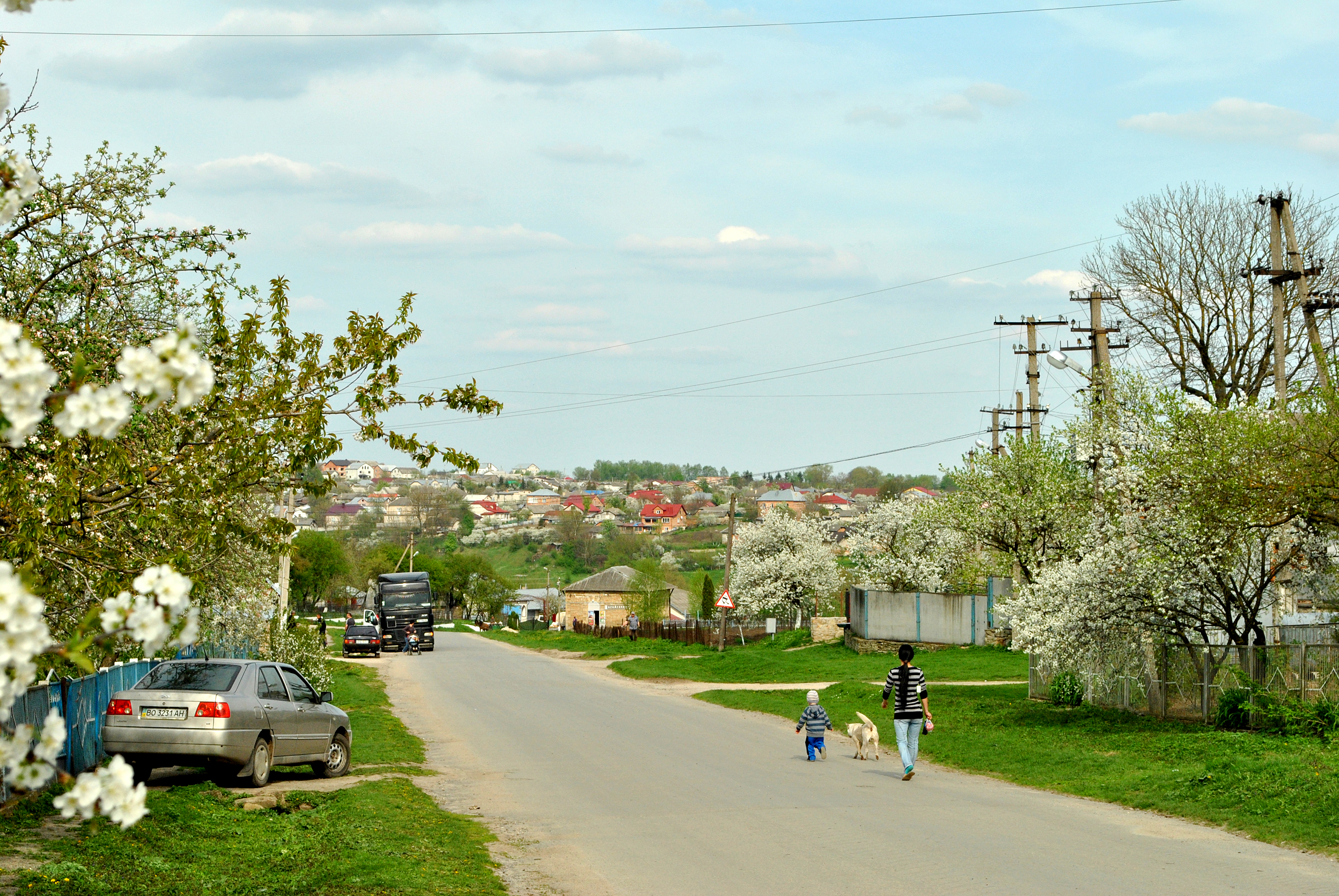
A street in Velyka Luka

Velyka Luka (Ukrainian: Велика Лука) is a village in Velyka Berezovytsia settlement hromada, Ternopil Raion, Ternopil Oblast, Ukraine.

== History ==
The first written mention of the village was in 1473.

== Religion ==
- St. Michael's church (1740, brick, UGCC).

== Sources ==
- (in Ukrainian) Уніят В., Велика Лука // Ternopil Encyclopedic Dictionary: in 4 v. / editorial board: H. Yavorskyi and other, Ternopil: "Zbruch", 2004, V. 1: А—Й, S. 236. — ISBN 966-528-197-6.
- "(7) Łuka Wielka (Łuka Wełyka)". Geographical Dictionary of the Kingdom of Poland (in Polish). 5. Warszawa: Kasa im. Józefa Mianowskiego. 1884. p. 809.
