= Ivan Chaikivskyi =

Ukrainian agricultural magnate and politician

- Іван Чайківський
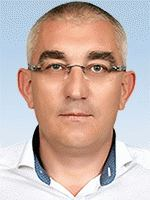
- Official portrait, 2019

People's Deputy of Ukraine
- Incumbent
- Assumed office 29 August 2019
- Preceded by: Taras Yuryk
- Constituency: Ternopil Oblast, No. 165

Personal details
- Born: May 29, 1972 (age 53) Nastasiv, Ukrainian SSR, Soviet Union (now Ukraine)
- Party: For the Future
- Other political affiliations: Agrarian Party of Ukraine

Ivan Adamovych Chaikivskyi (Ukrainian: Іван Адамович Чайківський born 29 May 1972) is a Ukrainian agricultural magnate and politician serving as a People's Deputy of Ukraine representing Ukraine's 165th electoral district in Ternopil Oblast since 2019. He is a member of the For the Future party. He was a member of the deputy group "For the Future". He was conferred the "For Work and Victory" (2008) medal. He is a knight of the Order of Merit III degree (2012).

== Early life ==
He was born in the village of Nastasiv, Ternopil Raion, Ternopil Oblast.

He graduated from Ternopil Vocational School No. 10 (1990, specialty "Construction"). From 1990 to 1992 he served in the Armed Forces of Ukraine. In 2009 he received a master's degree in economics and investment management from Ternopil National University of Economics.

== Career ==
He was the chairman of the board of the Association of Owners "Kolos" (Nastasiv village, Ternopil region), and headed the company "Ahroprodservis".

In 2010, he became a deputy of the Ternopil Raion Rada.

He served as vice-chairman of the Agrarian Party of Ukraine. From 2016 he headed the regional organization of the Agrarian Party in Ternopil.

He was Secretary of the Committee on Agrarian Policy and Land Relations at the Verkhovna Rada of Ukraine of the 9th convocation (elected on 29 August 2019).

He is married and has a daughter and a son.

== Sources ==
- (in Ukrainian) І. Дем`янова, Г. Яворський, Чайківський Іван Адамович // Ternopil Encyclopedic Dictionary: in 4 v. / editorial board: H. Yavorskyi and other, Ternopil: "Zbruch", 2010, V. 4: А—Я (додатковий), S. 712. — ISBN 978-966-528-318-8.
- Чайківський Іван Адамович // Lb.ua, June 11, 2020.
