= Myshkovychi, Ternopil Oblast =

Rural locality in Ternopil Oblast, Ukraine

Myshkovychi Мишковичі
- Location in Ternopil Oblast
- Coordinates: 49°26′47″N 25°36′27″E
- Country: Ukraine
- Oblast: Ternopil Oblast
- Raion: Ternopil Raion
- Hromada: Velyka Berezovytsia settlement hromada
- Time zone: UTC+2 (EET)
  - Summer (DST): UTC+3 (EEST)
- Postal code: 47732

Myshkovychi (Ukrainian: Мишковичі, Polish: Myszkowice) is a village in Velyka Berezovytsia settlement hromada, Ternopil Raion, Ternopil Oblast, Ukraine.

== History ==
The first written mention of the village was in 1564.

== Religion ==
- Two churches of the Intercession (1817, brick, 1990 restored, OCU; 2003, brick, architect Mykhailo Netribiak, UGCC).

== Sources ==
- (in Ukrainian) Савенко В., Мишковичі // Ternopil Encyclopedic Dictionary: in 4 v. / editorial board: H. Yavorskyi and other, Ternopil: "Zbruch", 2005, V. 2: К—О, S. 525. — ISBN 966-528-199-2.
- "Myszkowice, wś nad Seretem, pow. tarnopolski". Geographical Dictionary of the Kingdom of Poland (in Polish). 6. Warszawa: Kasa im. Józefa Mianowskiego. 1885. p. 843.
