= 2010–11 Biathlon World Cup – Pursuit Women =

The 2010–11 Biathlon World Cup – Pursuit Women will start at Sunday December 5, 2009 in Östersund and will finish Saturday March 19, 2011 in Oslo. Defending titlist is Magdalena Neuner of Germany.

== Competition format ==
This is a pursuit competition. The biathletes' starts are separated by their time differences from a previous race, most commonly a sprint race. The contestants ski a distance of 10 kilometres (6.2 mi) over five laps. On four of the laps, the contestants shoot at targets; each miss requires the contestant to ski a penalty loop of 150 metres (490 ft). There are two prone shooting bouts and two standing bouts, in that order. The contestant crossing the finish line first is the winner.

To prevent awkward and/or dangerous crowding of the skiing loops, and overcapacity at the shooting range, World Cup Pursuits are held with only the 60 top ranking biathletes after the preceding race. The biathletes shoot (on a first-come, first-served basis) at the lane corresponding to the position they arrived for all shooting bouts.

Points are awarded for each event, according to each contestant's finish. When all events are completed. the contestant with the highest number of points is declared the season winner.

== 2009–10 Top 3 Standings ==
Medal	Athlete	Points
Gold:	(Germany) Magdalena Neuner	256
Silver:	(Germany) Simone Hauswald	217
Bronze:	(Russia) Olga Zaitseva	207

== Medal winners ==
Event:	Gold:	Time	Silver:	Time	Bronze:	Time
Östersund details	Kaisa Mäkäräinen; Finland	31:57.1 (0+0+0+0)	Miriam Gössner; Germany	33:22.4 (0+1+1+1)	Helena Ekholm; Sweden	33:38.6 (0+1+0+1)
Hochfilzen details	Helena Ekholm; Sweden	35:17.8 (0+1+0+0)	Kaisa Mäkäräinen; Finland	35:49.8 (0+0+0+2)	Darya Domracheva; Belarus	36:04.1 (0+0+1+2)
Ruhpolding details	Tora Berger; Norway	28:50.9 (0+0+0+1)	Andrea Henkel; Germany	29:28.6 (0+0+1+1)	Kaisa Mäkäräinen; Finland	29:50.2 (2+0+0+0)
Presque Isle details	Tora Berger; Norway	35:12.1 (0+1+2+1)	Marie Dorin; France	35:42.8 (0+0+1+2)	Darya Domracheva; Belarus	36:23.3 (0+0+3+2)
Fort Kent details	Andrea Henkel; Germany	31:09.1 (0+0+1+0)	Magdalena Neuner; Germany	31:33.9 (2+0+0+1)	Marie Dorin; France	32:02.7 (0+0+0+0)
World Championships 2011 details	Kaisa Mäkäräinen; Finland	30:00.1 (0+0+0+0)	Magdalena Neuner; Germany	30:21.7 (0+0+0+2)	Helena Ekholm; Sweden	31:43.7 (0+0+0+0)
Oslo details	Anastasiya Kuzmina; Slovakia	33:42.5 (0+2+1+0)	Darya Domracheva; Belarus	34:05.6 (2+0+1+2)	Andrea Henkel; Germany	34:10.1 (0+0+1+2)

== Standings ==
#	Name	ÖST	HOC	RUH	PRI	FRK	WCH	OSL	Total
1	Kaisa Mäkäräinen (FIN)	60	54	48	38	40	60	43	343
2	Andrea Henkel (GER)	28	30	54	40	60	43	48	303
3	Helena Ekholm (SWE)	48	60	38	31	29	48	25	279
4	Tora Berger (NOR)	—	31	60	60	43	40	34	268
5	Darya Domracheva (BLR)	34	48	28	48	34	6	54	252
6	Magdalena Neuner (GER)	—	36	34	43	54	54	—	221
7	Marie Dorin (FRA)	23	15	23	54	48	26	22	211
8	Anna Carin Zidek (SWE)	43	40	43	17	30	28	7	208
9	Miriam Gössner (GER)	54	16	19	12	31	36	38	206
10	Anastasiya Kuzmina (SVK)	27	34	36	—	—	38	60	195
11	Teja Gregorin (SLO)	32	32	25	1	36	23	18	167
12	Valj Semerenko (UKR)	40	24	30	28	22	17	0	161
13	Ekaterina Yurlova (RUS)	29	28	32	—	—	31	40	160
14	Kathrin Hitzer (GER)	24	23	21	8	38	15	27	156
15	Ann Kristin Flatland (NOR)	25	29	27	18	20	—	28	147
16	Svetlana Sleptsova (RUS)	36	21	31	26	—	—	32	146
17	Olga Zaitseva (RUS)	38	22	40	—	—	29	2	131
18	Tina Bachmann (GER)	31	11	10	29	18	—	30	129
19	Vita Semerenko (UKR)	19	26	29	—	—	24	31	129
20	Anna Bogaliy-Titovets (RUS)	26	38	20	—	—	30	11	125
21	Michela Ponza (ITA)	—	14	14	32	11	27	23	121
22	Nadezhda Skardino (BLR)	7	13	0	21	28	25	12	106
23	Marie Laure Brunet (FRA)	18	43	26	16	—	—	—	103
24	Andreja Mali (SLO)	16	19	15	34	7	8	0	99
25	Agnieszka Cyl (POL)	12	7	—	30	27	14	—	90
26	Olena Pidhrushna (UKR)	30	1	11	—	—	22	24	88
27	Anais Bescond (FRA)	15	8	8	—	25	20	10	86
28	Ekaterina Glazyrina (RUS)	—	—	—	27	32	—	19	78
29	Inna Suprun (UKR)	3	0	—	0	24	21	26	74
30	Yana Romanova (RUS)	0	27	22	6	13	—	—	68
31	Jana Gereková (SVK)	5	20	0	—	—	34	4	63
32	Eveli Saue (EST)	22	2	—	4	26	0	9	63
33	Natalya Burdyga (UKR)	—	—	16	24	21	—	—	61
34	Éva Tófalvi (ROU)	0	9	24	—	15	13	—	61
35	Sabrina Buchholz (GER)	0	18	9	14	12	—	5	58
36	Synnøve Solemdal (NOR)	4	0	13	22	—	0	17	56
37	Sophie Boilley (FRA)	0	0	—	36	16	2	0	54
38	Sara Studebaker (USA)	—	0	0	13	14	3	21	51
39	Katja Haller (ITA)	20	—	—	11	0	18	—	49
40	Selina Gasparin (SUI)	0	0	6	0	6	—	36	48
41	Anna Maria Nilsson (SWE)	6	10	3	2	10	16	0	47
42	Natalia Guseva (RUS)	—	—	0	23	8	—	15	46
43	Uliana Denisova (RUS)	—	—	—	25	19	—	—	44
44	Liudmila Kalinchik (BLR)	2	0	2	15	23	0	—	42
45	Veronika Vítková (CZE)	0	—	1	20	9	7	0	37
46	Dorothea Wierer (ITA)	—	—	4	—	—	32	0	36
47	Madara Līduma (LAT)	9	0	17	—	—	—	8	34
48	Pauline Macabies (FRA)	0	12	18	0	0	—	—	30
49	Evgeniya Sedova (RUS)	—	—	—	—	—	—	29	29
50	Tadeja Brankovič-Likozar (SLO)	0	5	12	—	—	12	—	29
51	Mari Laukkanen (FIN)	—	—	—	7	5	0	16	28
52	Marina Lebedeva (KAZ)	—	25	—	—	—	0	—	25
53	Haley Johnson (USA)	—	—	0	3	0	—	20	23
54	Anna Karin Strömstedt (SWE)	—	—	0	0	17	5	0	22
55	Fanny Welle-Strand Horn (NOR)	0	4	0	5	0	10	3	22
56	Oksana Khvostenko (UKR)	21	—	—	—	—	—	—	21
57	Ekaterina Iourieva (RUS)	—	—	—	19	1	—	—	20
58	Olga Poltoranina (KAZ)	17	3	—	—	—	0	—	20
59	Karin Oberhofer (ITA)	0	—	7	—	—	—	13	20
60	Gabriela Soukalová (CZE)	—	—	—	—	—	19	0	19
61	Olga Vilukhina (RUS)	—	17	—	—	—	—	—	17
62	Weronika Nowakowska-Ziemniak (POL)	13	—	—	—	4	—	—	17
63	Kadri Lehtla (EST)	11	—	0	—	—	—	6	17
64	Juliane Doll (GER)	14	—	—	—	—	—	0	14
65	Nadine Horchler (GER)	—	—	—	—	—	—	14	14
66	Elisabeth Högberg (SWE)	0	—	—	9	2	—	1	12
67	Ramona Dueringer (AUT)	—	—	—	—	—	11	—	11
68	Laure Soulie (AND)	—	—	0	10	—	0	—	10
69	Diana Rasimovičiūtė (LTU)	10	—	—	—	—	—	—	10
70	Magdalena Gwizdoń (POL)	0	—	—	—	—	9	—	9
71	Wang Chunli (CHN)	8	—	—	—	—	1	—	9
72	Tang Jialin (CHN)	0	6	—	—	—	—	0	6
73	Jenny Jonsson (SWE)	—	—	5	0	—	—	0	5
74	Ekaterina Vinogradova (ARM)	—	—	—	0	0	4	0	4
75	Nina Klenovska (BUL)	—	0	0	0	3	—	—	3
76	Fuyuko Suzuki (JPN)	1	0	—	—	—	0	—	1
