= 2010–11 Biathlon World Cup – Mass start Women =

The 2010–11 Biathlon World Cup – Mass start Women will start at January 9, 2011, in Oberhof and will finish in Oslo. Defending titlist is Magdalena Neuner of Germany.

== Competition format ==
In the mass start, all biathletes start at the same time and the first across the finish line wins. In this 12.5 kilometres (7.8 mi) competition, the distance is skied over five laps; there are four bouts of shooting (two prone, two standing, in that order) with the first shooting bout being at the lane corresponding to your bib (Bib #10 shoots at lane #10 regardless of position in race.) with rest of the shooting bouts being at the lane in the position they arrived (Arrive at the lane in fifth place, you shoot at lane five.). As in sprint races, competitors must ski one 150 m penalty loop for each miss. Here again, to avoid unwanted congestion, World Cup Mass starts are held with only the 30 top ranking athletes on the start line (half that of the Pursuit as here all contestants start simultaneously).

== 2009–10 Top 3 Standings ==
Medal	Athlete	Points
Gold:	(Germany) Magdalena Neuner	216
Silver:	(Germany) Simone Hauswald	198
Bronze:	(Germany) Andrea Henkel	169

== Medal winners ==
Event:	Gold:	Time	Silver:	Time	Bronze:	Time
Oberhof details	Helena Ekholm; Sweden	39:22.9 (0+0+0+0)	Andrea Henkel; Germany	39:24.5 (0+1+1+0)	Svetlana Sleptsova; Russia	39:28.1 (0+0+0+0)
Antholz-Anterselva details	Tora Berger; Norway	33:56.3 (0+1+0+1)	Marie-Laure Brunet; France	33:56.9 (0+0+0+1)	Darya Domracheva; Belarus	34:02.1 (0+0+0+0)
Fort Kent details	Magdalena Neuner; Germany	39:48.9 (0+0+0+1)	Andrea Henkel; Germany	39:54.2 (0+0+1+0)	Darya Domracheva; Belarus	39:59.3 (1+0+0+0)
World Championships details	Magdalena Neuner; Germany	36:48.5 (0+1+2+1)	Darya Domracheva; Belarus	36:53.3 (2+1+0+0)	Tora Berger; Norway	37:02.5 (2+1+0+0)
Oslo details	Darya Domracheva; Belarus	36:13.0 (1+0+0+2)	Anna Bogaliy-Titovets; Russia	36:29.0 (0+0+0+1)	Olga Zaitseva; Russia	36:38.0 (0+0+1+0)

== Standings ==
#	Name	OBE	ANT	FRK	WCH	OSL	Total
1	Darya Domracheva (BLR)	26	48	48	54	60	236
2	Magdalena Neuner (GER)	32	38	60	60	38	228
3	Tora Berger (NOR)	30	60	43	48	25	206
4	Andrea Henkel (GER)	54	26	54	28	43	205
5	Helena Ekholm (SWE)	60	25	38	36	36	195
6	Marie Laure Brunet (FRA)	43	54	28	32	—	157
7	Teja Gregorin (SLO)	27	40	25	40	20	152
8	Kaisa Mäkäräinen (FIN)	31	dsq	40	43	26	140
9	Marie Dorin (FRA)	28	24	32	34	22	140
10	Svetlana Sleptsova (RUS)	48	32	17	—	40	137
11	Olga Zaitseva (RUS)	24	21	—	38	48	131
12	Anna Bogaliy-Titovets (RUS)	25	31	—	18	54	128
13	Anna Carin Zidek (SWE)	29	30	29	23	17	128
14	Valj Semerenko (UKR)	19	22	31	25	30	127
15	Anastasiya Kuzmina (SVK)	36	43	—	31	15	125
16	Miriam Gössner (GER)	22	13	27	27	28	117
17	Tina Bachmann (GER)	21	18	21	29	27	116
18	Vita Semerenko (UKR)	38	17	—	16	31	102
19	Ann Kristin Flatland (NOR)	40	36	11	—	13	100
20	Kathrin Hitzer (GER)	12	20	36	—	32	100
21	Ekaterina Yurlova (RUS)	34	19	—	26	18	97
22	Agnieszka Cyl (POL)	14	23	30	22	—	89
23	Michela Ponza (ITA)	—	—	22	30	23	75
24	Eveli Saue (EST)	11	28	24	—	11	74
25	Selina Gasparin (SUI)	—	34	15	—	24	73
26	Yana Romanova (RUS)	23	27	23	—	—	73
27	Olena Pidhrushna (UKR)	—	29	—	17	16	62
28	Nadezhda Skardino (BLR)	—	—	14	24	21	59
29	Sabrina Buchholz (GER)	17	—	34	—	—	51
30	Natalia Guseva (RUS)	—	15	—	—	34	49
31	Anais Bescond (FRA)	—	—	16	19	12	47
32	Sara Studebaker (USA)	—	—	18	—	19	37
33	Liudmila Kalinchik (BLR)	15	—	20	—	—	35
34	Evgeniya Sedova (RUS)	—	—	—	—	29	29
35	Anna Maria Nilsson (SWE)	—	14	—	15	—	29
36	Laura Spector (USA)	16	12	—	—	—	28
37	Inna Suprun (UKR)	—	—	13	14	—	27
38	Ekaterina Glazyrina (RUS)	—	—	26	—	—	26
39	Éva Tófalvi (ROU)	—	—	—	21	—	21
40	Dorothea Wierer (ITA)	—	—	—	20	—	20
40	Marina Lebedeva (KAZ)	20	—	—	—	—	20
42	Andreja Mali (SLO)	—	—	19	—	—	19
43	Oksana Khvostenko (UKR)	18	—	—	—	—	18
44	Jenny Jonsson (SWE)	—	16	—	—	—	16
45	Haley Johnson (USA)	—	—	—	—	14	14
46	Jana Gereková (SVK)	—	—	—	13	—	13
46	Elena Khrustaleva (KAZ)	13	—	—	—	—	13
48	Uliana Denisova (RUS)	—	—	12	—	—	12
48	Fanny Welle-Strand Horn (NOR)	—	—	—	12	—	12
50	Veronika Vítková (CZE)	—	—	—	11	—	11
