= 2010–11 Biathlon World Cup – Individual Women =

The 2010–11 Biathlon World Cup – Individual Women will start at Wednesday December 1, 2010 in Östersund and will finish Wednesday March 9, 2011 in Khanty-Mansiysk at Biathlon World Championships 2011 event. Defending titlist is Anna Carin Olofsson-Zidek of Sweden.

== Competition format ==
The 15 kilometres (9.3 mi) individual race is the oldest biathlon event; the distance is skied over five laps. The biathlete shoots four times at any shooting lane, in the order of prone, standing, prone, standing, totalling 20 targets. For each missed target a fixed penalty time, usually one minute, is added to the skiing time of the biathlete. Competitors' starts are staggered, normally by 30 seconds.

== 2009-10 Top 3 Standings ==
Medal	Athlete	Points
Gold:	(Sweden) Anna Carin Olofsson-Zidek	132
Silver:	(Germany) Andrea Henkel	126
Bronze:	(Germany) Kati Wilhelm	121

== Medal winners ==
Event:	Gold:	Time	Silver:	Time	Bronze:	Time
Östersund details	Anna Carin Zidek; Sweden	45:26.1 (0+0+0+0)	Marie Laure Brunet; France	45:35.0 (1+0+0+1)	Helena Ekholm; Sweden	46:08.8 (1+0+0+1)
Pokljuka details	Tora Berger; Norway	42:47.0 (0+0+0+0)	Kaisa Mäkäräinen; Finland	42:48.8 (0+0+0+1)	Marie-Laure Brunet; France	43:22.3 (0+0+0+0)
Ruhpolding details	Olga Zaitseva; Russia	41:46.1 (0+0+0+0)	Andrea Henkel; Germany	42:00.6 (0+0+0+0)	Helena Ekholm; Sweden	42:23.5 (0+0+0+0)
Biathlon World Championships 2011 details	Helena Ekholm; Sweden	47:08.3 (0+0+0+0)	Tina Bachmann; Germany	49:24.1 (0+2+0+0)	Vita Semerenko; Ukraine	50:00.4 (1+0+0+2)

== Standings ==
#	Name	ÖST	POK	RUH	WCH	Total
1	Helena Ekholm (SWE)	48	17	48	60	173
2	Valj Semerenko (UKR)	43	43	43	30	159
3	Olga Zaitseva (RUS)	38	40	60	—	138
4	Tora Berger (NOR)	10	60	32	31	133
5	Marie Laure Brunet (FRA)	54	48	30	0	132
6	Kaisa Mäkäräinen (FIN)	30	54	34	13	131
7	Vita Semerenko (UKR)	14	30	36	48	128
8	Andrea Henkel (GER)	32	29	54	0	115
9	Anna Carin Zidek (SWE)	60	36	16	0	112
10	Marie Dorin (FRA)	29	3	40	38	110
11	Tina Bachmann (GER)	23	11	21	54	109
12	Teja Gregorin (SLO)	36	32	27	11	106
13	Svetlana Sleptsova (RUS)	34	31	38	—	103
14	Magdalena Neuner (GER)	—	34	25	40	99
15	Iana Romanova (RUS)	40	13	31	4	88
16	Agnieszka Cyl (POL)	24	27	13	19	83
17	Selina Gasparin (SUI)	18	6	29	28	81
18	Ekaterina Yurlova (RUS)	12	21	10	36	79
19	Katja Haller (ITA)	28	9	26	15	78
20	Nadezhda Skardino (BLR)	0	16	15	43	74
21	Olena Pidhrushna (UKR)	26	15	14	17	72
22	Eveli Saue (EST)	1	14	17	29	61
23	Anastasiya Kuzmina (SVK)	0	28	0	32	60
24	Oksana Khvostenko (UKR)	21	25	12	—	58
25	Ann Kristin Flatland (NOR)	31	26	0	0	57
26	Sabrina Buchholz (GER)	8	—	28	21	57
27	Éva Tófalvi (ROU)	3	24	20	10	57
28	Michela Ponza (ITA)	15	7	19	14	55
29	Darya Domracheva (BLR)	6	23	0	22	51
30	Marina Lebedeva (KAZ)	0	38	9	1	48
31	Anais Bescond (FRA)	0	0	22	25	47
32	Paulina Bobak (POL)	27	0	0	18	45
33	Sara Studebaker (USA)	0	20	0	24	44
34	Karin Oberhofer (ITA)	17	0	0	26	43
35	Veronika Vítková (CZE)	7	—	0	34	41
36	Natalia Guseva (RUS)	—	0	4	27	31
37	Natalya Burdyga (UKR)	—	—	7	23	30
38	Andreja Mali (SLO)	0	5	18	3	26
39	Magdalena Gwizdon (POL)	25	0	0	0	25
40	Juliane Doll (GER)	0	0	24	—	24
41	Anna Maria Nilsson (SWE)	0	22	0	2	24
42	Claire Breton (FRA)	0	—	23	—	23
43	Kari Henneseid Eie (NOR)	5	18	—	—	23
44	Synnøve Solemdal (NOR)	22	—	0	0	22
45	Anna Bogaliy-Titovets (RUS)	0	0	0	20	20
46	Olga Vilukhina (RUS)	20	—	—	—	20
47	Zdenka Vejnarova (CZE)	19	0	0	0	19
48	Monika Hojnisz (POL)	0	19	—	0	19
49	Barbora Tomesova (CZE)	0	8	5	6	19
50	Laura Spector (USA)	16	0	0	0	16
51	Roberta Fiandino (ITA)	—	—	—	16	16
52	Pauline Macabies (FRA)	13	0	3	—	16
53	Fanny Welle-Strand Horn (NOR)	0	1	1	12	14
54	Jenny Jonsson (SWE)	0	0	8	5	13
55	Kathrin Hitzer (GER)	0	12	—	—	12
56	Liudmila Kalinchik (BLR)	0	0	11	0	11
57	Sophie Boilley (FRA)	11	0	—	0	11
58	Irina Mozhevitina (KAZ)	0	10	0	0	10
59	Inna Suprun (UKR)	9	0	0	—	9
60	Iris Waldhuber (AUT)	0	—	—	9	9
61	Laure Soulie (AND)	—	—	0	8	8
62	Amanda Lightfoot (GBR)	0	0	0	7	7
63	Megan Imrie (CAN)	0	0	6	—	6
64	Olga Poltoranina (KAZ)	4	0	—	0	4
65	Kadri Lehtla (EST)	0	4	0	0	4
66	Miriam Gössner (GER)	2	0	2	—	4
67	Nina Klenovska (BUL)	0	2	0	0	2
