= 2010–11 Biathlon World Cup – Relay Women =

The 2010–11 Biathlon World Cup – Relay Women started on Saturday December 11, 2010 in Hochfilzen and ended on Sunday March 13, 2011 in Khanty-Mansiysk at Biathlon World Championships 2011 event. The defending titlist was the Russian team.

== Competition format ==
The relay teams consist of four biathletes. Each ski 6 kilometres (3.7 mi), each leg skied over three laps, with two shooting rounds; one prone, one standing.

For every round of five targets there are eight bullets available, though the last three can only be single-loaded manually one at a time from spare round holders or bullets deposited by the competitor into trays or onto the mat at the firing line.

If after eight bullets there are still misses, one 150 m penalty loop must be taken for each missed target remaining. The first-leg participants start all at the same time, and as in cross-country skiing relays, every athlete of a team must touch the team's next-leg participant to perform a valid changeover.

On the first shooting stage of the first leg, the participant must shoot in the lane corresponding to their bib number (Bib #10 shoots at lane #10 regardless of position in race.), then for the remainder of the relay, the relay team shoots at the lane in the position they arrived (Arrive at the range in 5th place, you shoot at lane five.).

== 2009–10 Top 3 Standings ==
Medal	Country	Points
Gold:	Russia	234
Silver:	Germany	205
Bronze:	France	204

== Medal winners ==
Event:	Gold:	Time	Silver:	Time	Bronze:	Time
Hochfilzen details	Germany; Kathrin Hitzer; Magdalena Neuner; Sabrina Buchholz; Andrea Henkel	1:16:22.5 (0+1) (0+2) (0+0) (0+1) (0+1) (0+2) (0+1) (0+1)	Ukraine; Oksana Khvostenko; Olena Pidhrushna; Vita Semerenko; Valj Semerenko	1:17:21.6 (0+2) (0+2) (0+1) (0+0) (0+0) (0+0) (0+1) (0+2)	Norway; Synnøve Solemdal; Ann Kristin Flatland; Fanny Welle-Strand Horn; Tora Berger	1:17:30.9 (0+1) (0+2) (0+1) (0+2) (0+3) (0+0) (0+0) (0+0)
Oberhof details	Sweden; Jenny Jonsson; Anna Carin Zidek; Anna Maria Nilsson; Helena Ekholm	1:17:53.1 (0+1) (0+0) (0+0) (1+3) (0+1) (0+2) (0+1) (0+0)	France; Anais Bescond; Marie Dorin; Pauline Macabies; Marie Laure Brunet	1:18:45.4 (0+2) (0+2) (0+0) (0+0) (0+0) (3+3) (0+0) (0+2)	Belarus; Nadezhda Skardino; Darya Domracheva; Nadzeya Pisareva; Liudmila Kalinchik	1:19:24.5 (0+0) (1+3) (0+0) (0+3) (0+2) (0+2) (0+2) (0+1)
Antholz-Anterselva details	Russia; Svetlana Sleptsova; Anna Bogaliy-Titovets; Natalia Guseva; Olga Zaitseva	1:11:14.7 (0+1) (0+0) (0+1) (0+2) (0+0) (0+2) (0+0) (0+0)	Sweden; Jenny Jonsson; Anna Carin Zidek; Anna Maria Nilsson; Helena Ekholm	1:12:11.8 (0+0) (0+0) (0+3) (0+1) (0+1) (0+1) (0+1) (0+0)	Germany; Sabrina Buchholz; Kathrin Hitzer; Miriam Gössner; Andrea Henkel	1:13:34.8 (2+3) (0+0) (0+0) (0+2) (0+1) (2+3) (0+1) (0+3)
World Championships 2011 details	Germany; Andrea Henkel; Miriam Gössner; Tina Bachmann; Magdalena Neuner	1:13:31.1 (0+2) (0+1) (0+2) (2+3) (0+2) (0+2) (0+1) (0+0)	France; Anais Bescond; Marie-Laure Brunet; Sophie Boilley; Marie Dorin	1:14:18.3 (0+2) (0+1) (0+0) (0+0) (0+3) (0+2) (0+1) (0+0)	Belarus; Nadezhda Skardino; Darya Domracheva; Nadzeya Pisareva; Liudmila Kalinchik	1:15:18.5 (0+0) (0+1) (0+1) (0+0) (0+0) (0+0) (0+1) (1+3)

== Standings ==
#	Name	HOC	OBE	ANT	WCH	Total
1	Germany	60	38	48	60	206
2	Sweden	38	60	54	38	190
3	Russia	43	40	60	34	177
4	France	40	54	29	54	177
5	Belarus	36	48	43	48	176
6	Norway	48	34	38	40	160
7	Italy	32	32	40	43	147
8	Poland	34	36	32	32	134
9	Ukraine	54	43	34	DSQ	131
10	Slovakia	31	29	30	36	126
11	Kazakhstan	29	30	36	27	122
12	Czech Republic	28	31	25	30	114
13	Bulgaria	27	23	26	29	105
14	China	23	26	24	25	98
15	Japan	24	25	22	24	95
16	Finland	—	24	31	31	86
17	Estonia	25	—	27	26	78
18	Austria	26	27	23	—	76
19	South Korea	22	—	21	23	66
20	Canada	30	28	—	—	58
21	United States	—	—	28	28	56
22	United Kingdom	21	—	—	22	43
