= 2010–11 Biathlon World Cup – Mass start Men =

The 2010–11 Biathlon World Cup – Mass start Men was to start on January 9, 2011 in Oberhof. Defending titlist is Evgeny Ustyugov of Russia.

== Competition format ==
In the mass start, all biathletes start at the same time and the first across the finish line wins. In this 15.0 kilometres (9.3 mi) competition, the distance is skied over five laps; there are four bouts of shooting (two prone, two standing, in that order) with the first shooting bout being at the lane corresponding to your bib (Bib #10 shoots at lane #10 regardless of position in race.) with rest of the shooting bouts being at the lane in the position they arrived (Arrive at the lane in fifth place, you shoot at lane five.). As in sprint races, competitors must ski one 150 m penalty loop for each miss. Here again, to avoid unwanted congestion, World Cup Mass starts are held with only the 30 top ranking athletes on the start line (half that of the Pursuit as here all contestants start simultaneously).

== 2009–10 Top 3 standings ==
Medal	Athlete	Points
Gold:	(Russia) Evgeny Ustyugov	197
Silver:	(Norway) Emil Hegle Svendsen	163
Bronze:	(Germany) Arnd Peiffer	161

== Medal winners ==
Event:	Gold:	Time	Silver:	Time	Bronze:	Time
Oberhof details	Tarjei Bø; Norway	39:51.3 (0+1+0+1)	Emil Hegle Svendsen; Norway	39:53.7 (1+0+2+0)	Ivan Tcherezov; Russia	39:55.4 (0+0+1+1)
Antholz-Anterselva details	Martin Fourcade; France	35:33.4 (0+0+1+0)	Björn Ferry; Sweden	35:50.6 (0+0+1+1)	Anton Shipulin; Russia	35:51.0 (1+1+0+0)
Fort Kent details	Martin Fourcade; France	39:48.9 (0+0+2+0)	Tomasz Sikora; Poland	39:52.0 (0+0+0+0)	Tarjei Bø; Norway	39:53.6 (0+0+1+1)
World Championships details	Emil Hegle Svendsen; Norway	38:42.7 (0+0+0+1)	Evgeny Ustyugov; Russia	38:47.7 (0+0+0+0)	Lukas Hofer; Italy	38:57.0 (0+0+0+1)
Oslo details	Emil Hegle Svendsen; Norway	39:07.6 (0+1+1+0)	Evgeny Ustyugov; Russia	39:08.0 (0+0+0+1)	Ole Einar Bjørndalen; Norway	39:17.6 (0+1+0+0)

== Standings ==
#	Name	OBE	ANT	FRK	WCH	OSL	Total
1	Emil Hegle Svendsen (NOR)	54	32	38	60	60	244
2	Martin Fourcade (FRA)	43	60	60	31	36	230
3	Tarjei Bø (NOR)	60	26	48	43	34	211
4	Evgeny Ustyugov (RUS)	28	13	—	54	54	149
5	Lukas Hofer (ITA)	22	22	34	48	22	148
6	Arnd Peiffer (GER)	29	40	—	34	40	143
7	Ole Einar Bjørndalen (NOR)	20	36	—	38	48	142
8	Ivan Tcherezov (RUS)	48	29	—	40	23	140
9	Christoph Sumann (AUT)	17	25	24	29	43	138
10	Björn Ferry (SWE)	31	54	—	14	38	137
11	Michael Greis (GER)	40	38	—	21	30	129
12	Michal Šlesingr (CZE)	34	30	28	15	13	120
13	Simon Eder (AUT)	32	34	—	32	19	117
14	Andrei Makoveev (RUS)	38	—	22	36	20	116
15	Fredrik Lindström (SWE)	—	18	36	30	26	110
16	Serguei Sednev (UKR)	15	28	31	16	15	105
17	Vincent Jay (FRA)	26	31	17	—	28	102
18	Carl Johan Bergman (SWE)	25	23	29	12	12	101
19	Andreas Birnbacher (GER)	27	—	43	25	—	95
20	Daniel Mesotitsch (AUT)	24	43	—	—	27	94
21	Christoph Stephan (GER)	—	14	27	17	32	90
22	Anton Shipulin (RUS)	14	48	—	—	17	79
23	Tomasz Sikora (POL)	—	24	54	—	—	78
24	Alexis Bœuf (FRA)	23	21	18	—	16	78
25	Alexander Os (NOR)	13	—	40	—	21	74
26	Christian De Lorenzi (ITA)	—	20	19	18	14	71
27	Maxim Tchoudov (RUS)	36	11	11	11	—	69
28	Lars Berger (NOR)	—	12	—	27	25	64
29	Jakov Fak (SLO)	19	17	25	—	—	61
30	Markus Windisch (ITA)	—	27	15	13	—	55
31	Lowell Bailey (USA)	—	19	32	—	—	51
32	Maxim Maksimov (RUS)	—	—	23	23	—	46
33	Klemen Bauer (SLO)	—	—	16	22	—	38
34	Lois Habert (FRA)	18	—	14	—	—	32
35	Florian Graf (GER)	—	—	—	—	31	31
36	Dominik Landertinger (AUT)	30	—	—	—	—	30
36	Daniel Böhm (GER)	—	—	30	—	—	30
38	Serhiy Semenov (UKR)	—	—	—	19	11	30
39	Alexander Wolf (GER)	—	—	—	—	29	29
40	Andriy Deryzemlya (UKR)	—	—	—	28	—	28
41	Krasimir Anev (BUL)	12	15	—	—	—	27
42	Jaroslav Soukup (CZE)	—	—	26	—	—	26
42	Simon Fourcade (FRA)	—	—	—	26	—	26
44	Leif Nordgren (USA)	—	—	—	24	—	24
44	Tobias Eberhard (AUT)	—	—	—	—	24	24
46	Benjamin Weger (SUI)	11	—	13	—	—	24
47	Rune Brattsveen (NOR)	—	—	21	—	—	21
47	Jean-Philippe Leguellec (CAN)	21	—	—	—	—	21
49	Jean-Guillaume Béatrix (FRA)	—	—	20	—	—	20
49	Edgars Piksons (LAT)	—	—	—	20	—	20
51	Pavol Hurajt (SVK)	—	—	—	—	18	18
52	Evgeniy Garanichev (RUS)	—	17	—	—	—	17
53	Brendan Green (CAN)	16	—	—	—	—	16
54	Julian Eberhard (AUT)	—	—	12	—	—	12
