= 2010–11 Biathlon World Cup – Relay Men =

The 2010–11 Biathlon World Cup – Relay Men will start at Sunday December 12, 2010 in Hochfilzen and will finish Friday March 11, 2011 in Khanty-Mansiysk at Biathlon World Championships 2011 event. Defending titlist is Norwegian team.

== Competition format ==
The relay teams consist of four biathletes, who each ski 7.5 kilometres (4.7 mi), each leg skied over three laps, with two shooting rounds; one prone, one standing. For every round of five targets there are eight bullets available, though the last three can only be single-loaded manually one at a time from spare round holders or bullets deposited by the competitor into trays or onto the mat at the firing line. If after eight bullets there are still misses, one 150 m penalty loop must be taken for each missed target remaining. The first-leg participants start all at the same time, and as in cross-country skiing relays, every athlete of a team must touch the team's next-leg participant to perform a valid changeover. On the first shooting stage of the first leg, the participant must shoot in the lane corresponding to their bib number (Bib #10 shoots at lane #10 regardless of position in race.), then for the remainder of the relay, the relay team shoots at the lane in the position they arrived (Arrive at the range in 5th place, you shoot at lane five.).

== 2009–10 Top 3 Standings ==
Medal	Country	Points
Gold:	Norway	228
Silver:	Austria	210
Bronze:	Russia	205

== Medal winners ==
Event:	Gold:	Time	Silver:	Time	Bronze:	Time
Hochfilzen details	Norway; Alexander Os; Ole Einar Bjørndalen; Emil Hegle Svendsen; Tarjei Bø	1:29:38.2 (1+3) (0+1) (0+0) (0+0) (0+0) (0+1) (0+2) (0+0)	Austria; Daniel Mesotitsch; Tobias Eberhard; Christoph Sumann; Dominik Landertinger	1:30:31.3 (0+1) (0+1) (0+0) (0+1) (0+0) (0+0) (0+0) (0+1)	France; Vincent Jay; Jean-Guillaume Béatrix; Lois Habert; Martin Fourcade	1:33:07.0 (0+0) (0+1) (0+1) (0+0) (0+1) (1+3) (1+3) (0+0)
Oberhof details	Germany; Christoph Stephan; Alexander Wolf; Arnd Peiffer; Michael Greis	1:23:53.0 (1+3) (0+0) (1+3) (0+0) (0+2) (0+2) (0+3) (0+3)	Czech Republic; Zdeněk Vítek; Jaroslav Soukup; Ondřej Moravec; Michal Šlesingr	1:26:15.8 (0+1) (0+0) (0+2) (1+3) (1+3) (0+0) (0+2) (1+3)	Norway; Alexander Os; Lars Berger; Rune Brattsveen; Ole Einar Bjørndalen	1:26:17.0 (0+2) (2+3) (0+1) (4+3) (0+1) (0+2) (0+0) (0+2)
Antholz-Anterselva details	Germany; Christoph Stephan; Daniel Böhm; Arnd Peiffer; Michael Greis	1:10:17.2 (0+1) (0+0) (0+0) (0+2) (0+2) (0+0) (0+0) (0+2)	Italy; Christian de Lorenzi; Rene Laurent Vuillermoz; Lukas Hofer; Markus Windisch	1:10:35.8 (0+2) (0+1) (0+0) (0+1) (0+0) (0+3) (0+0) (0+2)	Norway; Emil Hegle Svendsen; Ole Einar Bjørndalen; Alexander Os; Tarjei Bø	1:10:45.4 (0+1) (0+1) (0+0) (0+0) (0+0) (0+2) (0+1) (0+3)
World Championships 2011 details	Norway; Ole Einar Bjørndalen; Alexander Os; Emil Hegle Svendsen; Tarjei Bø	1:16:13.5 (0+0) (0+0) (0+0) (1+3) (0+1) (0+2) (0+1) (1+3)	Russia; Anton Shipulin; Evgeny Ustyugov; Maxim Maksimov; Ivan Tcherezov	1:16:26.9 (0+1) (0+1) (0+0) (0+2) (0+1) (0+0) (0+3) (0+0)	Ukraine; Olexander Bilanenko; Andriy Deryzemlya; Serhiy Semenov; Serguei Sednev	1:16:41.5 (0+1) (0+2) (0+1) (0+2) (0+0) (0+1) (0+2) (0+1)

== Standings ==
#	Name	HOC	OBE	ANT	WCH	Total
1	Norway	60	48	48	60	216
2	Germany	43	60	60	36	199
3	Ukraine	38	43	34	48	163
4	Italy	31	36	54	40	161
5	Austria	54	28	40	32	154
6	Russia	28	27	43	54	152
7	France	48	38	36	29	151
8	Sweden	40	29	38	43	150
9	Slovenia	34	40	29	34	137
10	Czech Republic	36	54	—	31	121
11	Belarus	26	34	30	28	118
12	Switzerland	32	31	31	24	118
13	United States	21	25	32	38	116
14	Japan	20	32	26	21	99
15	Bulgaria	30	20	24	25	99
16	Finland	27	19	28	22	96
17	Poland	29	24	22	20	95
18	Estonia	19	26	23	26	94
19	Slovakia	23	22	25	23	93
20	Kazakhstan	22	23	27	19	91
21	Canada	25	30	—	30	85
22	United Kingdom	17	18	21	18	74
23	China	18	21	20	—	59
24	Latvia	24	—	—	27	51
25	South Korea	16	—	—	17	33
26	Serbia	15	—	—	15	30
27	Lithuania	—	—	—	16	16
