= 2010–11 Biathlon World Cup – Individual Men =

The 2010–11 Biathlon World Cup – Individual Men will start at Thursday December 2, 2010 in Östersund and will finish Tuesday March 8, 2011 in Khanty-Mansiysk at Biathlon World Championships 2011 event. Defending titlist is Christoph Sumann of Austria.

== Competition format ==
The 20 kilometres (12 mi) individual race is the oldest biathlon event; the distance is skied over five laps. The biathlete shoots four times at any shooting lane, in the order of prone, standing, prone, standing, totalling 20 targets. For each missed target a fixed penalty time, usually one minute, is added to the skiing time of the biathlete. Competitors' starts are staggered, normally by 30 seconds.

== 2009-10 Top 3 Standings ==
| Medal | Athlete | Points |
|---|---|---|
| Gold: | (Austria) Christoph Sumann | 142 |
| Silver: | (Norway) Emil Hegle Svendsen | 120 |
| Bronze: | (Austria) Daniel Mesotitsch | 120 |

== Medal winners ==
| Event: | Gold: | Time | Silver: | Time | Bronze: | Time |
|---|---|---|---|---|---|---|
| Östersund details | Emil Hegle Svendsen; Norway | 55:07.7 (0+1+0+1) | Ole Einar Bjørndalen; Norway | 55:26.8 (0+0+0+2) | Martin Fourcade; France | 55:45.5 (0+1+0+0) |
| Pokljuka details | Daniel Mesotitsch; Austria | 52:05.6 (0+0+0+1) | Benjamin Weger; Switzerland | 53:04.0 (0+0+1+0) | Serguei Sednev; Ukraine | 53:26.8 (0+0+0+1) |
| Ruhpolding details | Emil Hegle Svendsen; Norway | 50:39.4 (0+0+0+1) | Martin Fourcade; France | 50:46.8 (0+0+0+1) | Dominik Landertinger; Austria | 51:03.1 (0+0+0+1) |
| Biathlon World Championships 2011 details | Tarjei Bø; Norway | 48:29.9 (0+0+1+0) | Maxim Maksimov; Russia | 49:09.9 (0+0+0+0) | Christoph Sumann; Austria | 49:15.4 (0+0+0+1) |

== Standings ==
| # | Name | ÖST | POK | RUH | WCH | Total |
|---|---|---|---|---|---|---|
| 1 | Emil Hegle Svendsen (NOR) | 60 | 25 | 60 | 43 | 188 |
| 2 | Tarjei Bø (NOR) | 43 | 29 | 40 | 60 | 172 |
| 3 | Martin Fourcade (FRA) | 48 | 0 | 54 | 31 | 133 |
| 4 | Ole Einar Bjørndalen (NOR) | 54 | 0 | 34 | 38 | 126 |
| 5 | Michael Greis (GER) | 30 | 9 | 38 | 36 | 113 |
| 6 | Daniel Mesotitsch (AUT) | 31 | 60 | 18 | 0 | 109 |
| 7 | Vincent Jay (FRA) | 11 | 40 | 32 | 22 | 105 |
| 8 | Christoph Sumann (AUT) | 20 | 32 | — | 48 | 100 |
| 9 | Tomasz Sikora (POL) | 40 | 34 | 24 | — | 98 |
| 10 | Andreas Birnbacher (GER) | 29 | 30 | — | 34 | 93 |
| 11 | Michal Šlesingr (CZE) | 36 | 0 | 23 | 29 | 88 |
| 12 | Maxim Tchoudov (RUS) | 24 | 6 | 26 | 32 | 88 |
| 13 | Björn Ferry (SWE) | 16 | 0 | 30 | 40 | 86 |
| 14 | Arnd Peiffer (GER) | 19 | 18 | 21 | 26 | 84 |
| 15 | Evgeny Ustyugov (RUS) | — | 19 | 36 | 28 | 83 |
| 16 | Maxim Maksimov (RUS) | 25 | — | — | 54 | 79 |
| 17 | Serguei Sednev (UKR) | 27 | 48 | 0 | — | 75 |
| 18 | Dominik Landertinger (AUT) | 0 | 0 | 48 | 25 | 73 |
| 19 | Simon Eder (AUT) | 8 | 13 | 28 | 24 | 73 |
| 20 | Anton Shipulin (RUS) | 22 | 22 | 27 | — | 71 |
| 21 | Carl Johan Bergman (SWE) | 28 | 12 | 0 | 30 | 70 |
| 22 | Benjamin Weger (SUI) | 0 | 54 | 5 | 7 | 66 |
| 23 | Oleg Berezhnoy (UKR) | 0 | 43 | — | 23 | 66 |
| 24 | Simon Fourcade (FRA) | 21 | — | 43 | 2 | 66 |
| 25 | Jaroslav Soukup (CZE) | 0 | 36 | 29 | 0 | 65 |
| 26 | Christian De Lorenzi (ITA) | 26 | 26 | 0 | 8 | 60 |
| 27 | Krasimir Anev (BUL) | 23 | 17 | 19 | 0 | 59 |
| 28 | Ivan Tcherezov (RUS) | — | 4 | 31 | 19 | 54 |
| 29 | Klemen Bauer (SLO) | 38 | 0 | 11 | 1 | 50 |
| 30 | Andriy Deryzemlya (UKR) | 3 | 16 | — | 27 | 46 |
| 31 | Evgeny Abramenko (BLR) | 9 | 0 | 22 | 15 | 46 |
| 32 | Alexis Bœuf (FRA) | 0 | 31 | 14 | 0 | 45 |
| 33 | Janez Marič (SLO) | 32 | 0 | — | 10 | 42 |
| 34 | Alexey Volkov (RUS) | 17 | 23 | — | — | 40 |
| 35 | Miroslav Matiaško (SVK) | 0 | 38 | — | 0 | 38 |
| 36 | Jakov Fak (SLO) | 34 | 3 | — | — | 37 |
| 37 | Alexander Os (NOR) | 15 | 21 | 0 | 0 | 36 |
| 38 | Brendan Green (CAN) | 0 | 20 | 16 | 0 | 36 |
| 39 | Serhiy Semenov (UKR) | 12 | 0 | — | 21 | 33 |
| 40 | Pavol Hurajt (SVK) | 0 | 14 | 0 | 18 | 32 |
| 41 | Lois Habert (FRA) | 0 | 15 | 16 | — | 31 |
| 42 | Michail Kletcherov (BUL) | 0 | 24 | 0 | 5 | 29 |
| 43 | Rune Brattsveen (NOR) | — | 28 | — | — | 28 |
| 44 | Tobias Eberhard (AUT) | 0 | 27 | 0 | — | 27 |
| 45 | Leif Nordgren (USA) | 6 | 0 | 0 | 20 | 26 |
| 46 | Ilmārs Bricis (LAT) | 14 | 0 | 12 | 0 | 26 |
| 47 | Lowell Bailey (USA) | 0 | 0 | 25 | 0 | 25 |
| 48 | Tim Burke (USA) | 10 | 0 | 0 | 11 | 21 |
| 49 | Christoph Stephan (GER) | 0 | 0 | 20 | — | 20 |
| 50 | Alexander Wolf (GER) | 18 | 1 | 1 | — | 20 |
| 51 | Lars Berger (NOR) | 7 | 0 | 13 | 0 | 20 |
| 52 | Ondřej Moravec (CZE) | 0 | 0 | 17 | — | 17 |
| 53 | Indrek Tobreluts (EST) | — | 0 | 0 | 17 | 17 |
| 54 | Artem Pryma (UKR) | — | — | 0 | 16 | 16 |
| 55 | Olexander Bilanenko (UKR) | 5 | 11 | — | — | 16 |
| 56 | Alexsandr Chervyhkov (KAZ) | 0 | 0 | 10 | 6 | 16 |
| 57 | Lukas Hofer (ITA) | 0 | 0 | 0 | 14 | 14 |
| 58 | Daniel Böhm (GER) | — | 2 | 0 | 12 | 14 |
| 59 | Zdeněk Vítek (CZE) | 0 | 0 | — | 13 | 13 |
| 60 | Simon Schempp (GER) | 13 | — | — | — | 13 |
| 61 | Łukasz Szczurek (POL) | 4 | 0 | 8 | 0 | 12 |
| 62 | Scott Perras (CAN) | — | 10 | 0 | 0 | 10 |
| 63 | Tomáš Holubec (CZE) | 0 | — | 9 | 0 | 9 |
| 64 | Dušan Šimočko (SVK) | 0 | 0 | 0 | 9 | 9 |
| 65 | Sergey Novikov (BLR) | 0 | 8 | — | 0 | 8 |
| 66 | Timo Antila (FIN) | — | 7 | 0 | 0 | 7 |
| 67 | Friedrich Pinter (AUT) | 0 | — | 7 | — | 7 |
| 68 | Fredrik Lindström (SWE) | 0 | 0 | 6 | 0 | 6 |
| 69 | Christian Martinelli (ITA) | — | 5 | — | — | 5 |
| 70 | Rene Laurent Vuillermoz (ITA) | — | — | 5 | — | 5 |
| 71 | Hidenori Isa (JPN) | 0 | 0 | — | 4 | 4 |
| 72 | Edgars Piksons (LAT) | 0 | — | 0 | 3 | 3 |
| 73 | Jarkko Kauppinen (FIN) | — | 0 | 3 | 0 | 3 |
| 74 | Junji Nagai (JPN) | 0 | 0 | 2 | 0 | 2 |
| 75 | Christian Stebler (SUI) | 2 | 0 | 0 | — | 2 |
| 76 | Tobias Arwidson (SWE) | 1 | — | — | 0 | 1 |
