= 2010–11 Biathlon World Cup =

Biathlon competition

Discipline	Men	Women
Overall	(Norway) Tarjei Bø	(Finland) Kaisa Mäkäräinen
Nations Cup	Norway	Germany
Individual	(Norway) Emil Hegle Svendsen	(Sweden) Helena Ekholm
Sprint	(Norway) Tarjei Bø	(Germany) Magdalena Neuner
Pursuit	(Norway) Tarjei Bø	(Finland) Kaisa Mäkäräinen
Mass start	(Norway) Emil Hegle Svendsen	(Belarus) Darya Domracheva
Relay	Norway	Germany
- Mixed: France

Competition

The 2010–11 Biathlon World Cup was a multi-race tournament over a season of biathlon, organised by the International Biathlon Union. The season started on 29 November 2010 in Östersund, Sweden and ended 20 March 2011 in Holmenkollen, Norway.

== Calendar ==
Below is the IBU World Cup calendar for the 2010–11 season.

Location	Date	Individual	Sprint	Pursuit	Mass start	Relay	Mixed relay	Details
(Sweden) Östersund	1–5 December	●	●	●				details
(Austria) Hochfilzen	10–12 December		●	●		●		details
(Slovenia) Pokljuka	16–19 December	●	●				●	details
(Germany) Oberhof	5–9 January		●		●	●		details
(Germany) Ruhpolding	12–16 January	●	●	●				details
(Italy) Antholz-Anterselva	20–23 January		●		●	●		details
(United States) Presque Isle	4–6 February		●	●			●	details
(United States) Fort Kent	10–13 February		●	●	●			details
(Russia) Khanty-Mansiysk	3–13 March	●	●	●	●	●	●	World Championships
(Norway) Holmenkollen	17–20 March		●	●	●			details
Total		4	10	7	5	4	3	

== World Cup podiums ==
=== Men ===
Stage	Date	Place	Discipline	Winner	Second	Third	Yellow bib (After competition)	Det.
1	2 December 2010	(Sweden) Östersund	20 km Individual	(Norway) Emil Hegle Svendsen	(Norway) Ole Einar Bjørndalen	(France) Martin Fourcade	(Norway) Emil Hegle Svendsen	Detail
1	4 December 2010	(Sweden) Östersund	10 km Sprint	(Norway) Emil Hegle Svendsen	(Norway) Ole Einar Bjørndalen	(France) Martin Fourcade	(Norway) Emil Hegle Svendsen	Detail
1	5 December 2010	(Sweden) Östersund	12.5 km Pursuit	(Norway) Ole Einar Bjørndalen	(Norway) Emil Hegle Svendsen	(Slovenia) Jakov Fak	(Norway) Emil Hegle Svendsen	Detail
2	10 December 2010	(Austria) Hochfilzen	10 km Sprint	(Norway) Tarjei Bø	(Ukraine) Serhiy Sednev	(France) Alexis Bœuf	(Norway) Emil Hegle Svendsen	Detail
2	11 December 2010	(Austria) Hochfilzen	12.5 km Pursuit	(Norway) Tarjei Bø	(Austria) Simon Eder	(Russia) Ivan Tcherezov	(Norway) Emil Hegle Svendsen	Detail
3	16 December 2010	(Slovenia) Pokljuka	20 km Individual	(Austria) Daniel Mesotitsch	(Switzerland) Benjamin Weger	(Ukraine) Serhiy Sednev	(Norway) Emil Hegle Svendsen	Detail
3	18 December 2010	(Slovenia) Pokljuka	10 km Sprint	(Sweden) Björn Ferry	(Norway) Tarjei Bø	(Germany) Michael Greis	(Norway) Tarjei Bø	Detail
4	7 January 2011	(Germany) Oberhof	10 km Sprint	(Norway) Tarjei Bø	(Germany) Arnd Peiffer	(Czech Republic) Michal Šlesingr	(Norway) Tarjei Bø	Detail
4	9 January 2011	(Germany) Oberhof	15 km Mass Start	(Norway) Tarjei Bø	(Norway) Emil Hegle Svendsen	(Russia) Ivan Tcherezov	(Norway) Tarjei Bø	Detail
5	12 January 2011	(Germany) Ruhpolding	20 km Individual	(Norway) Emil Hegle Svendsen	(France) Martin Fourcade	(Austria) Dominik Landertinger	(Norway) Tarjei Bø	Detail
5	14 January 2011	(Germany) Ruhpolding	10 km Sprint	(Norway) Lars Berger	(France) Martin Fourcade	(Russia) Ivan Tcherezov	(Norway) Tarjei Bø	Detail
5	16 January 2011	(Germany) Ruhpolding	12.5 km Pursuit	(Sweden) Björn Ferry	(France) Martin Fourcade	(Germany) Michael Greis	(Norway) Tarjei Bø	Detail
6	20 January 2011	(Italy) Antholz-Anterselva	10 km Sprint	(Russia) Anton Shipulin	(Germany) Michael Greis	(Norway) Lars Berger	(Norway) Tarjei Bø	Detail
6	22 January 2011	(Italy) Antholz-Anterselva	15 km Mass Start	(France) Martin Fourcade	(Sweden) Björn Ferry	(Russia) Anton Shipulin	(Norway) Tarjei Bø	Detail
7	4 February 2011	(United States) Presque Isle	10 km Sprint	(Germany) Arnd Peiffer	(France) Martin Fourcade	(Russia) Ivan Tcherezov	(Norway) Tarjei Bø	Detail
7	6 February 2011	(United States) Presque Isle	12.5 km Pursuit	(France) Alexis Bœuf	(Russia) Ivan Tcherezov	(Sweden) Carl Johan Bergman	(Norway) Tarjei Bø	Detail
8	10 February 2011	(United States) Fort Kent	10 km Sprint	(Norway) Emil Hegle Svendsen	(Czech Republic) Michal Šlesingr	(Norway) Tarjei Bø	(Norway) Tarjei Bø	Detail
8	12 February 2011	(United States) Fort Kent	12.5 km Pursuit	(Norway) Emil Hegle Svendsen	(France) Martin Fourcade	(Norway) Tarjei Bø	(Norway) Tarjei Bø	Detail
8	13 February 2011	(United States) Fort Kent	15 km Mass Start	(France) Martin Fourcade	(Poland) Tomasz Sikora	(Norway) Tarjei Bø	(Norway) Tarjei Bø	Detail
WC	5 March 2011	(Russia) Khanty-Mansiysk	10 km Sprint	(Germany) Arnd Peiffer	(France) Martin Fourcade	(Norway) Tarjei Bø	(Norway) Tarjei Bø	Detail
WC	6 March 2011	(Russia) Khanty-Mansiysk	12.5 km Pursuit	(France) Martin Fourcade	(Norway) Emil Hegle Svendsen	(Norway) Tarjei Bø	(Norway) Tarjei Bø	Detail
WC	8 March 2011	(Russia) Khanty-Mansiysk	20 km Individual	(Norway) Tarjei Bø	(Russia) Maxim Maksimov	(Austria) Christoph Sumann	(Norway) Tarjei Bø	Detail
WC	12 March 2011	(Russia) Khanty-Mansiysk	15 km Mass Start	(Norway) Emil Hegle Svendsen	(Italy) Lukas Hofer	(Norway) Tarjei Bø	(Norway) Tarjei Bø	Detail
9	17 March 2011	(Norway) Oslo Holmenkollen	10 km Sprint	(Germany) Andreas Birnbacher	(Sweden) Björn Ferry	(Germany) Alexander Wolf	(Norway) Tarjei Bø	Detail
9	19 March 2011	(Norway) Oslo Holmenkollen	12.5 km Pursuit	(Norway) Emil Hegle Svendsen	(Norway) Tarjei Bø	(France) Martin Fourcade	(Norway) Tarjei Bø	Detail
9	20 March 2011	(Norway) Oslo Holmenkollen	15 km Mass Start	(Norway) Emil Hegle Svendsen	(Russia) Evgeny Ustyugov	(Norway) Ole Einar Bjørndalen	(Norway) Tarjei Bø	Detail

=== Women ===
Stage	Date	Place	Discipline	Winner	Second	Third	Yellow bib (After competition)	Det.
1	1 December 2010	(Sweden) Östersund	15 km Individual	(Sweden) Anna Carin Olofsson-Zidek	(France) Marie-Laure Brunet	(Sweden) Helena Ekholm	(Sweden) Anna Carin Olofsson-Zidek	Detail
1	3 December 2010	(Sweden) Östersund	7.5 km Sprint	(Finland) Kaisa Mäkäräinen	(Germany) Miriam Gössner	(Belarus) Darya Domracheva	(Sweden) Anna Carin Olofsson-Zidek	Detail
1	5 December 2010	(Sweden) Östersund	10 km Pursuit	(Finland) Kaisa Mäkäräinen	(Germany) Miriam Gössner	(Sweden) Helena Ekholm	(Finland) Kaisa Mäkäräinen	Detail
2	10 December 2010	(Austria) Hochfilzen	7.5 km Sprint	(Slovakia) Anastázia Kuzminová	(Belarus) Darya Domracheva	(Finland) Kaisa Mäkäräinen	(Finland) Kaisa Mäkäräinen	Detail
2	12 December 2010	(Austria) Hochfilzen	10 km Pursuit	(Sweden) Helena Ekholm	(Finland) Kaisa Mäkäräinen	(Belarus) Darya Domracheva	(Finland) Kaisa Mäkäräinen	Detail
3	16 December 2010	(Slovenia) Pokljuka	15 km Individual	(Norway) Tora Berger	(Finland) Kaisa Mäkäräinen	(France) Marie-Laure Brunet	(Finland) Kaisa Mäkäräinen	Detail
3	18 December 2010	(Slovenia) Pokljuka	7.5 km Sprint	(Germany) Magdalena Neuner	(Slovakia) Anastázia Kuzminová	(Finland) Kaisa Mäkäräinen	(Finland) Kaisa Mäkäräinen	Detail
4	8 January 2011	(Germany) Oberhof	7.5 km Sprint	(Norway) Ann Kristin Flatland	(Germany) Magdalena Neuner	(Germany) Andrea Henkel	(Finland) Kaisa Mäkäräinen	Detail
4	9 January 2011	(Germany) Oberhof	12.5 km Mass Start	(Sweden) Helena Ekholm	(Germany) Andrea Henkel	(Russia) Svetlana Sleptsova	(Finland) Kaisa Mäkäräinen	Detail
5	13 January 2011	(Germany) Ruhpolding	15 km Individual	(Russia) Olga Zaitseva	(Germany) Andrea Henkel	(Sweden) Helena Ekholm	(Finland) Kaisa Mäkäräinen	Detail
5	15 January 2011	(Germany) Ruhpolding	7.5 km Sprint	(Norway) Tora Berger	(Germany) Andrea Henkel	(Germany) Magdalena Neuner	(Finland) Kaisa Mäkäräinen	Detail
5	16 January 2011	(Germany) Ruhpolding	10 km Pursuit	(Norway) Tora Berger	(Germany) Andrea Henkel	(Finland) Kaisa Mäkäräinen	(Finland) Kaisa Mäkäräinen	Detail
6	21 January 2011	(Italy) Antholz-Anterselva	7.5 km Sprint	(Norway) Tora Berger	(Slovakia) Anastázia Kuzminová	(Russia) Olga Zaitseva	(Finland) Kaisa Mäkäräinen	Detail
6	23 January 2011	(Italy) Antholz-Anterselva	12.5 km Mass Start	(Norway) Tora Berger	(France) Marie-Laure Brunet	(Belarus) Darya Domracheva	(Finland) Kaisa Mäkäräinen	Detail
7	4 February 2011	(United States) Presque Isle	7.5 km Sprint	(Sweden) Helena Ekholm	(Norway) Tora Berger	(Ukraine) Valentyna Semerenko	(Sweden) Helena Ekholm	Detail
7	6 February 2011	(United States) Presque Isle	10 km Pursuit	(Norway) Tora Berger	(France) Marie Dorin	(Belarus) Darya Domracheva	(Sweden) Helena Ekholm	Detail
8	11 February 2011	(United States) Fort Kent	7.5 km Sprint	(Germany) Andrea Henkel	(Germany) Miriam Gössner	(Germany) Magdalena Neuner	(Finland) Kaisa Mäkäräinen	Detail
8	12 February 2011	(United States) Fort Kent	10 km Pursuit	(Germany) Andrea Henkel	(Germany) Magdalena Neuner	(France) Marie Dorin	(Finland) Kaisa Mäkäräinen	Detail
8	13 February 2011	(United States) Fort Kent	12.5 km Mass Start	(Germany) Magdalena Neuner	(Germany) Andrea Henkel	(Belarus) Darya Domracheva	(Germany) Andrea Henkel	Detail
WC	5 March 2011	(Russia) Khanty-Mansiysk	7.5 km Sprint	(Germany) Magdalena Neuner	(Finland) Kaisa Mäkäräinen	(Slovakia) Anastázia Kuzminová	(Finland) Kaisa Mäkäräinen	Detail
WC	6 March 2011	(Russia) Khanty-Mansiysk	10 km Pursuit	(Finland) Kaisa Mäkäräinen	(Germany) Magdalena Neuner	(Sweden) Helena Ekholm	(Finland) Kaisa Mäkäräinen	Detail
WC	9 March 2011	(Russia) Khanty-Mansiysk	15 km Individual	(Sweden) Helena Ekholm	(Germany) Tina Bachmann	(Ukraine) Vita Semerenko	(Sweden) Helena Ekholm	Detail
WC	12 March 2011	(Russia) Khanty-Mansiysk	12.5 km Mass Start	(Germany) Magdalena Neuner	(Belarus) Darya Domracheva	(Norway) Tora Berger	(Finland) Kaisa Mäkäräinen	Detail
9	17 March 2011	(Norway) Oslo Holmenkollen	7.5 km Sprint	(Germany) Magdalena Neuner	(Norway) Tora Berger	(Belarus) Darya Domracheva	(Finland) Kaisa Mäkäräinen	Detail
9	19 March 2011	(Norway) Oslo Holmenkollen	10 km Pursuit	(Slovakia) Anastázia Kuzminová	(Belarus) Darya Domracheva	(Germany) Andrea Henkel	(Finland) Kaisa Mäkäräinen	Detail
9	20 March 2011	(Norway) Oslo Holmenkollen	12.5 km Mass Start	(Belarus) Darya Domracheva	(Russia) Anna Bogaliy-Titovets	(Russia) Olga Zaitseva	(Finland) Kaisa Mäkäräinen	Detail

=== Men's team ===
Event	Date	Place	Discipline	Winner	Second	Third
2	12 December 2010	(Austria) Hochfilzen	4x7.5 km Relay	Norway Alexander Os; Ole Einar Bjørndalen; Emil Hegle Svendsen; Tarjei Bø	Austria Daniel Mesotitsch; Tobias Eberhard; Christoph Sumann; Dominik Landertinger	France Vincent Jay; Jean-Guillaume Béatrix; Lois Habert; Martin Fourcade
4	5 January 2011	(Germany) Oberhof	4x7.5 km Relay	Germany Christoph Stephan; Alexander Wolf; Arnd Peiffer; Michael Greis	Czech Republic Zdeněk Vítek; Jaroslav Soukup; Ondřej Moravec; Michal Šlesingr	Norway Alexander Os; Lars Berger; Rune Brattsveen; Ole Einar Bjørndalen
6	23 January 2011	(Italy) Antholz-Anterselva	4x7.5 km Relay	Germany Christoph Stephan; Daniel Böhm; Arnd Peiffer; Michael Greis	Italy Christian De Lorenzi; Rene-Laurent Vuillermoz; Lukas Hofer; Markus Windisch	Norway Emil Hegle Svendsen; Ole Einar Bjørndalen; Alexander Os; Tarjei Bø
WC	11 March 2011	(Russia) Khanty-Mansiysk	4x7.5 km Relay	Norway Ole Einar Bjørndalen; Alexander Os; Emil Hegle Svendsen; Tarjei Bø	Ukraine Olexander Bilanenko; Andriy Deryzemlya; Serhiy Semenov; Serhiy Sednev	Sweden Fredrik Lindström; Magnus Jonsson; Carl Johan Bergman; Björn Ferry

=== Women's team ===
Event	Date	Place	Discipline	Winner	Second	Third
2	11 December 2010	(Austria) Hochfilzen	4x6 km Relay	Germany Kathrin Hitzer; Magdalena Neuner; Sabrina Buchholz; Andrea Henkel	Ukraine Oksana Khvostenko; Olena Pidhrushna; Vita Semerenko; Valj Semerenko	Norway Synnove Solemdal; Ann Kristin Flatland; Fanny Horn; Tora Berger
4	6 January 2011	(Germany) Oberhof	4x6 km Relay	Sweden Jenny Jonsson; Anna Carin Zidek; Anna Maria Nilsson; Helena Ekholm	France Anais Bescond; Marie Dorin; Pauline Macabies; Marie-Laure Brunet	Belarus Nadezhda Skardino; Darya Domracheva; Nadzeya Pisarava; Liudmila Kalinchik
6	22 January 2011	(Italy) Antholz-Anterselva	4x6 km Relay	Russia Svetlana Sleptsova; Anna Bogaliy-Titovets; Natalia Sorokina; Olga Zaitseva	Sweden Jenny Jonsson; Anna Carin Zidek; Anna Maria Nilsson; Helena Ekholm	Germany Sabrina Buchholz; Kathrin Hitzer; Miriam Gössner; Andrea Henkel
WC	13 March 2011	(Russia) Khanty-Mansiysk	4x6 km Relay	Germany Andrea Henkel; Miriam Gössner; Tina Bachmann; Magdalena Neuner	France Anais Bescond; Marie-Laure Brunet; Sophie Boilley; Marie Dorin	Belarus Nadezhda Skardino; Darya Domracheva; Nadzeya Pisarava; Liudmila Kalinchik

=== Mixed Relay ===
Event	Date	Place	Discipline	Winner	Second	Third
3	19 December 2010	(Slovenia) Pokljuka	2x6+2x7.5 km Relay	Sweden Helena Ekholm; Anna Carin Zidek; Fredrik Lindström; Carl Johan Bergman	Ukraine Olena Pidhrushna; Vita Semerenko; Serhiy Semenov; Serhiy Sednev	France Marie-Laure Brunet; Marie Dorin; Vincent Jay; Martin Fourcade
7	5 February 2011	(United States) Presque Isle	2x6+2x7.5 km Relay	Germany Kathrin Hitzer; Magdalena Neuner; Alexander Wolf; Daniel Böhm	France Marie-Laure Brunet; Sophie Boilley; Vincent Jay; Alexis Boeuf	Russia Svetlana Sleptsova; Natalia Guseva; Ivan Tcherezov; Maxim Tchoudov
WC	3 March 2011	(Russia) Khanty-Mansiysk	2x6+2x7.5 km Relay	Norway Tora Berger; Ann Kristin Flatland; Ole Einar Bjørndalen; Tarjei Bø	Germany Andrea Henkel; Magdalena Neuner; Arnd Peiffer; Michael Greis	France Marie-Laure Brunet; Marie Dorin; Alexis Boeuf; Martin Fourcade

== Standings: Men ==
=== Overall ===
Pos.		Points
1.	(Norway) Tarjei Bø	1110
2.	(Norway) Emil Hegle Svendsen	1105
3.	(France) Martin Fourcade	990
4.	(Germany) Arnd Peiffer	735
5.	(Russia) Ivan Tcherezov	711

- Final standings after 26 races.

=== Individual ===
Pos.		Points
1.	(Norway) Emil Hegle Svendsen	188
2.	(Norway) Tarjei Bø	172
3.	(France) Martin Fourcade	133
4.	(Norway) Ole Einar Bjørndalen	126
5.	(Germany) Michael Greis	113

- Final standings after 4 races.

=== Sprint ===
Pos.		Points
1.	(Norway) Tarjei Bø	393
2.	(Norway) Emil Hegle Svendsen	369
3.	(Germany) Arnd Peiffer	333
4.	(France) Martin Fourcade	307
5.	(Germany) Michael Greis	293

- Final standings after 10 races.

=== Pursuit ===
Pos.		Points
1.	(Norway) Tarjei Bø	334
2.	(France) Martin Fourcade	320
3.	(Norway) Emil Hegle Svendsen	304
4.	(Russia) Ivan Tcherezov	229
5.	(Austria) Simon Eder	183

- Final standings after 7 races.

=== Mass start ===
Pos.		Points
1.	(Norway) Emil Hegle Svendsen	244
2.	(France) Martin Fourcade	230
3.	(Norway) Tarjei Bø	211
4.	(Russia) Evgeny Ustyugov	149
5.	(Italy) Lukas Hofer	148

- Final standings after 5 races.

=== Relay ===
Pos.		Points
1.	Norway	216
2.	Germany	199
3.	Ukraine	163
4.	Italy	161
5.	Austria	154

- Final standings after 4 races.

=== Nation ===
Pos.		Points
1.	Norway	7428
2.	Germany	6990
3.	Russia	6507
4.	Austria	6381
5.	France	6351

- Final standings after 21 races.

== Standings: Women ==
=== Overall ===
Pos.		Points
1.	(Finland) Kaisa Mäkäräinen	1010
2.	(Germany) Andrea Henkel	983
3.	(Sweden) Helena Ekholm	979
4.	(Norway) Tora Berger	965
5.	(Germany) Magdalena Neuner	955

- Final standings after 26 races.

=== Individual ===
Pos.		Points
1.	(Sweden) Helena Ekholm	174
2.	(Ukraine) Valj Semerenko	159
3.	(Russia) Olga Zaitseva	138
4.	(Norway) Tora Berger	134
5.	(France) Marie Laure Brunet	132

- Final standings after 4 races.

=== Sprint ===
Pos.		Points
1.	(Germany) Magdalena Neuner	404
2.	(Finland) Kaisa Mäkäräinen	395
3.	(Norway) Tora Berger	356
4.	(Germany) Andrea Henkel	353
5.	(Slovakia) Anastázia Kuzminová	329

- Final standings after 10 races.

=== Pursuit ===
Pos.		Points
1.	(Finland) Kaisa Mäkäräinen	343
2.	(Germany) Andrea Henkel	305
3.	(Sweden) Helena Ekholm	280
4.	(Norway) Tora Berger	269
5.	(Belarus) Darya Domracheva	255

- Final standings after 7 races.

=== Mass start ===
Pos.		Points
1.	(Belarus) Darya Domracheva	237
2.	(Germany) Magdalena Neuner	230
3.	(Germany) Andrea Henkel	207
4.	(Norway) Tora Berger	206
5.	(Sweden) Helena Ekholm	198

- Final standings after 5 races.

=== Relay ===
Pos.		Points
1.	Germany	206
2.	Sweden	190
3.	Russia	177
4.	France	177
5.	Belarus	175

- Final standings after 4 races.

=== Nation ===
Pos.		Points
1.	Germany	7236
2.	Russia	6813
3.	Sweden	6669
4.	France	6510
5.	Norway	6301

- Final standings after 21 races.

== Standings: Mixed ==
=== Mixed Relay ===
Pos.		Points
1.	France	150
2.	Germany	148
3.	Sweden	141
4.	Russia	129
5.	Italy	121

- Final standings after 3 races.

== Medal table ==
Rank	Nation	Gold	Silver	Bronze	Total
1	Norway	25	9	11	45
2	Germany	15	15	8	38
3	Sweden	9	3	5	17
4	France	4	12	9	25
5	Russia	3	6	10	19
6	Finland	3	3	3	9
7	Slovakia	2	2	1	5
8	Belarus	1	3	8	12
9	Austria	1	2	2	5
10	Ukraine	0	3	4	7
11	Czech Republic	0	2	1	3
12	Italy	0	1	1	2
13	Poland	0	1	0	1
13	Switzerland	0	1	0	1
15	Slovenia	0	0	1	1
Totals (15 entries)		63	63	64	190

== Achievements ==
First World Cup career victory

- Kaisa Mäkäräinen (FIN), 27, in her 7th season — the WC 1 Sprint in Östersund; first podium was 2007–08 Sprint in Pokljuka
- Tarjei Bø (NOR), 22, in his 2nd season — the WC 2 Sprint in Hochfilzen; it also was his first podium
- Ann Kristin Flatland (NOR), 28, in her 8th season — the WC 4 Sprint in Oberhof; first podium was 2009–10 Sprint in Oberhof
- Anton Shipulin (RUS), 23, in his 3rd season — the WC 6 Sprint in Anholz; it also was his first podium
- Alexis Bœuf (FRA), 24, in his 4th season — the WC 7 Pursuit in Presque Isle; first podium was 2009–10 Individual in Antholz
- Andreas Birnbacher (GER), 29, in his 10th season — the WC 9 Sprint in Oslo; first podium was 2004–05 Sprint in Pokliuka

First World Cup podium

- Miriam Gössner (GER), 20, in her 2nd season — no. 2 in the WC 1 Sprint in Östersund
- Benjamin Weger (SUI), 21, in his 2nd season — no. 2 in the WC 3 Individual in Pokljuka
- Valj Semerenko (UKR), 25, in her 6th season — no. 3 in the WC 7 Sprint in Presque Isle
- Lukas Hofer (ITA), 21, in his 3rd season — no. 3 in the WCh Mass Start in Khanty-Mansiysk

Victory in this World Cup (all-time number of victories in parentheses)

Men

- Emil Hegle Svendsen (NOR), 8 (24) first places
- Tarjei Bø (NOR), 5 (5) first places
- Martin Fourcade (FRA), 3 (6) first places
- Björn Ferry (SWE), 2 (5) first places
- Arnd Peiffer (GER), 2 (4) first places
- Ole Einar Bjørndalen (NOR), 1 (92) first place
- Lars Berger (NOR), 1 (6) first place
- Daniel Mesotitsch (AUT), 1 (3) first place
- Anton Shipulin (RUS), 1 (1) first place
- Alexis Bœuf (FRA), 1 (1) first place
- Andreas Birnbacher (GER), 1 (1) first place

Women

- Tora Berger (NOR), 6 (12) first places
- Magdalena Neuner (GER), 5 (24) first places
- Helena Ekholm (SWE), 4 (13) first places
- Kaisa Mäkäräinen (FIN), 3 (3) first places
- Andrea Henkel (GER), 2 (20) first places
- Anastasiya Kuzmina (SVK), 2 (3) first places
- Anna Carin Olofsson-Zidek (SWE), 1 (12) first places
- Olga Zaitseva (RUS), 1 (9) first places
- Darya Domracheva (BLR), 1 (3) first places
- Ann Kristin Flatland (NOR), 1 (1) first places

== Retirements ==
Following are notable biathletes who announced their retirement:

- Mattias Nilsson (SWE)
- Vyacheslav Derkach (UKR)
- Olga Nazarova (BLR)
- Zdenka Vejnarova (CZE)
- Julie Carraz-Collin (FRA)
- Anna Lebedeva (KAZ)
- Inna Mozhevitina (KAZ)
- Chu Kyoung-mi (KOR)
- Gerda Krumina (LAT)
- Madara Liduma (LAT)
- Julie Bonnevie-Svendsen (NOR)
- Solveig Rogstad (NOR)
- Sofia Domeij (SWE)
- Anna Carin Zidek (SWE)
- Oksana Khvostenko (UKR)
- Tadeja Brankovič-Likozar (SLO)
- Martina Halinárová (SVK)
