= 2010–11 Biathlon World Cup – World Cup 7 =

The 2010–11 Biathlon World Cup - World Cup 7 was held in Presque Isle, Maine, United States, from 4 February until 6 February 2011.

== Schedule of events ==
The time schedule of the event stands below

Date	Time	Events
February 4	15:30 CET	Men's 10 km Sprint
February 4	18:15 CET	Women's 7.5 km Sprint
February 5	20:25 CET	Mixed Relay
February 6	16:00 CET	Men's 12.5 km Pursuit
February 6	18:00 CET	Women's 10 km Pursuit

== Medal winners ==
=== Men ===
Event:	Gold:	Time	Silver:	Time	Bronze:	Time
10 km Sprint details	Arnd Peiffer; Germany	25:28.8 (0+0)	Martin Fourcade; France	25:44.7 (0+1)	Ivan Tcherezov; Russia	26:05.2 (0+0)
12.5 km Pursuit details	Alexis Bœuf; France	36:02.4 (0+1+0+1)	Ivan Tcherezov; Russia	36:12.7 (1+1+2+0)	Carl Johan Bergman; Sweden	36:16.7 (1+0+0+2)

=== Women ===
Event:	Gold:	Time	Silver:	Time	Bronze:	Time
7.5 km Sprint details	Helena Ekholm; Sweden	20:38.7 (0+0)	Tora Berger; Norway	20:47.5 (0+1)	Valj Semerenko; Ukraine	20:58.1 (0+0)
10 km Pursuit details	Tora Berger; Norway	35:12.1 (0+1+2+1)	Marie Dorin; France	35:42.8 (0+0+1+2)	Darya Domracheva; Belarus	36:23.3 (0+0+3+2)

=== Mixed ===
Event:	Gold:	Time	Silver:	Time	Bronze:	Time
2 x 6 km + 2 x 7.5 km Relay details	Germany; Kathrin Hitzer; Magdalena Neuner; Alexander Wolf; Daniel Böhm	1:13:31.6 (0+0) (0+2) (0+1) (0+1) (0+2) (0+1) (0+2) (0+2)	France; Marie-Laure Brunet; Sophie Boilley; Vincent Jay; Alexis Bœuf	1:13:59.5 (0+0) (0+2) (0+3) (0+1) (0+0) (0+0) (0+1) (0+0)	Russia; Svetlana Sleptsova; Natalia Guseva; Ivan Tcherezov; Maxim Tchoudov	1:14:33.0 (0+1) (0+2) (0+2) (0+1) (0+0) (0+2) (0+2) (0+3)

== Achievements ==
Best performance for all time

- Markus Windisch (ITA), 6th place in Sprint
- Julian Eberhard (AUT), 20th place in Sprint and 18th place in Pursuit
- Christian Stebler (SUI), 26th place in Sprint
- Sven Grossegger (AUT), 35th place in Sprint
- Oleksandr Batiuk (UKR), 36th place in Sprint
- Nathan Smith (CAN), 43rd place in Sprint
- Vitaliy Kilchytskyy (UKR), 51st place in Sprint and 44 place in Pursuit
- Danil Steptsenko (EST), 56th place in Sprint and 51st place in Pursuit
- Martin Bogdanov (BUL), 58th place in Sprint and 52nd place in Pursuit
- Miroslav Kenanov (BUL), 65th place in Sprint
- Milanko Petrovic (SRB), 67th place in Sprint
- Zach Hall (USA), 70th place in Sprint
- Alexis Bœuf (FRA), 1st place in Pursuit
- Henrik L'Abée-Lund (NOR), 10th place in Pursuit
- Valj Semerenko (UKR), 3rd place in Sprint
- Agnieszka Cyl (POL), 6th place in Sprint
- Sophie Boilley (FRA), 8th place in Sprint and 7th in Pursuit
- Sara Studebaker (USA), 14th place in Sprint
- Uliana Denisova (RUS), 16th place in Sprint and Pursuit
- Anna Karin Strömstedt (SWE), 31st place in Sprint
- Laure Soulie (AND), 34th place in Sprint and 31st at Pursuit
- Rosanna Crawford (CAN), 46th place in Sprint
- Luminita Piscoran (ROU), 53rd place in Sprint and 52nd in Pursuit
- Marie Dorin (FRA), 2nd place in Pursuit
- Ekaterina Glazyrina (RUS), 14th place in Pursuit
- Natalya Burdyga (UKR), 17th place in Pursuit
- Claude Godbout (CAN), 50th place in Pursuit

First World Cup race

- Henrik L'Abée-Lund (NOR), 17th place in Sprint
- Artem Ushakov (RUS), 66th place in Sprint
- Ekaterina Glazyrina (RUS), 39th place in Sprint
- Claude Godbout (CAN), 54th place in Sprint
