= Biathlon World Championships 2011 – Women's relay =

Women's relay at the Biathlon World Championships 2011
- Date: 13 March 2011
- Competitors: 80 from 20 nations
- Winning time: 1:13:31.1

Medalists
gold medal	Andrea Henkel; Miriam Gössner; Tina Bachmann; Magdalena Neuner	Germany
silver medal	Anaïs Bescond; Marie-Laure Brunet; Sophie Boilley; Marie Dorin	France
bronze medal	Nadezhda Skardino; Darya Domracheva; Nadzeya Pisareva; Liudmila Kalinchik	Belarus

The Women's relay of the Biathlon World Championships 2011 was held on March 13, 2011 at 15:00 with the participation of 20 nations.

== Results ==
Rank	Bib	Team	Time	Penalties (P+S)	Deficit
1st place, gold medalist(s)	2	Germany; Andrea Henkel; Miriam Gössner; Tina Bachmann; Magdalena Neuner	1:13:31.1; 18:40.8; 19:02.4; 18:59.6; 16:48.3	0+7 2+6; 0+2 0+1; 0+2 2+3; 0+2 0+2; 0+1 0+0	
2nd place, silver medalist(s)	6	France; Anaïs Bescond; Marie-Laure Brunet; Sophie Boilley; Marie Dorin	1:14:18.3; 19:17.7; 17:56.1; 19:21.8; 17:42.7	0+6 0+3; 0+2 0+1; 0+0 0+0; 0+3 0+2; 0+1 0+0	+47.2
3rd place, bronze medalist(s)	5	Belarus; Nadezhda Skardino; Darya Domracheva; Nadzeya Pisareva; Liudmila Kalinchik	1:15:18.5; 19:08.5; 17:44.0; 18:49.2; 19:36.8	0+2 1+4; 0+0 0+1; 0+1 0+0; 0+0 0+0; 0+1 1+3	+1:47.4
4	8	Italy; Michela Ponza; Karin Oberhofer; Katja Haller; Dorothea Wierer	1:16:13.8; 18:37.5; 19:11.6; 19:59.0; 18:25.7	0+0 1+7; 0+0 0+0; 0+0 0+3; 0+0 1+3; 0+0 0+1	+2:42.7
5	7	Norway; Synnøve Solemdal; Ann Kristin Aafedt Flatland; Fanny Welle-Strand Horn; Tora Berger	1:16:24.2; 19:25.5; 19:10.3; 20:07.2; 17:41.2	0+4 2+10; 0+2 0+2; 0+0 1+3; 0+2 1+3; 0+0 0+2	+2:53.1
6	1	Sweden; Jenny Jonsson; Anna Carin Zidek; Anna Maria Nilsson; Helena Ekholm	1:16:35.1; 19:57.3; 18:30.2; 19:54.0; 18:13.6	0+2 0+7; 0+0 0+1; 0+0 0+1; 0+2 0+2; 0+0 0+3	+3:04.0
7	11	Slovakia; Anastasiya Kuzmina; Jana Gereková; Martina Chrapánová; Martina Halinárová	1:17:43.8; 19:07.4; 18:42.2; 19:20.7; 20:33.5	0+1 1+11; 0+0 0+3; 0+1 0+3; 0+0 0+2; 0+0 1+3	+4:12.7
8	3	Russia; Ekaterina Yurlova; Anna Bogaliy-Titovets; Svetlana Sleptsova; Olga Zaitseva	1:18:04.3; 20:35.1; 20:04.4; 19:39.4; 17:45.4	3+5 3+7; 0+0 3+3; 3+3 0+0; 0+1 0+3; 0+1 0+1	+4:33.2
9	9	Poland; Paulina Bobak; Magdalena Gwizdoń; Monika Hojnisz; Agnieszka Cyl	1:18:26.6; 20:11.0; 19:33.9; 19:56.5; 18:45.2	0+4 0+5; 0+1 0+0; 0+2 0+1; 0+1 0+2; 0+0 0+2	+4:55.5
10	16	Finland; Mari Laukkanen; Sarianna Repo; Laura Toivanen; Kaisa Mäkäräinen	1:18:55.7; 19:57.6; 20:15.9; 20:46.6; 17:55.6	1+5 0+7; 1+3 0+1; 0+0 0+3; 0+2 0+3; 0+0 0+0	+5:24.6
11	12	Czech Republic; Veronika Vítková; Gabriela Soukalová; Barbora Tomešová; Zdeňka Vejnarová	1:19:13.8; 18:52.3; 20:06.4; 20:03.5; 20:11.6	0+5 4+9; 0+2 0+0; 0+2 2+3; 0+0 1+3; 0+1 1+3	+5:42.7
12	13	Bulgaria; Emilia Yordanova; Nina Klenovska; Niya Dimitrova; Desislava Stoyanova	1:19:41.6; 20:02.3; 19:01.4; 20:31.2; 20:06.7	0+2 2+8; 0+2 0+0; 0+0 0+2; 0+0 2+3; 0+0 0+3	+6:10.5
13	19	United States; Sara Studebaker; Laura Spector; Annelies Cook; Haley Johnson	1:19:55.7; 19:23.1; 19:41.9; 21:24.0; 19:26.7	1+7 2+9; 0+1 0+1; 0+0 0+2; 1+3 1+3; 0+3 1+3	+6:24.6
14	10	Kazakhstan; Marina Lebedeva; Olga Poltoranina; Inna Mozhevitina; Elena Khrustaleva	1:20:30.8; 19:38.0; 19:42.7; 19:35.7; 21:34.4	2+7 0+6; 0+0 0+2; 0+3 0+1; 0+1 0+1; 2+3 0+2	+6:59.7
15	17	Estonia; Kadri Lehtla; Daria Yurlova; Kristel Viigipuu; Sirli Hanni	LAP; 20:38.6; 20:59.3; 19:50.1	0+7 3+7; 0+2 2+3; 0+2 1+3; 0+2 0+0; 0+1 0+1	LAP
16	14	China; Tang Jialin; Wang Chunli; Xu Yinghui; Wang Yue	LAP; 19:54.1; 18:46.8; 20:12.5	3+5 3+8; 0+1 1+3; 0+0 0+0; 0+1 0+2; 3+3 2+3	LAP
17	15	Japan; Fuyuko Suzuki; Itsuka Owada; Natsuko Abe; Naoko Azegami	LAP; 20:36.9; 20:54.8; 20:48.1	2+8 1+8; 0+1 0+2; 2+3 0+1; 0+2 1+3; 0+2 0+2	LAP
18	18	South Korea; Mun Ji-hee; Chu Kyoung-mi; Kim Seo-ra; Jo In-hee	LAP; 20:36.7; 20:40.2; 21:22.0	0+7 0+4; 0+2 0+1; 0+1 0+0; 0+3 0+1; 0+1 0+2	LAP
19	20	Great Britain; Amanda Lightfoot; Adele Walker; Nerys Jones; Fay Potton	LAP; 22:22.2; 20:04.6; 22:53.2	0+5 5+10; 0+1 2+3; 0+1 0+2; 0+2 3+3; 0+1 0+2	LAP
	4	Ukraine; Valj Semerenko; Vita Semerenko; Olena Pidhrushna; Oksana Khvostenko	DSQ		
