= 2010–11 Biathlon World Cup – World Cup 2 =

Coordinates: 47°28′N 12°37′E

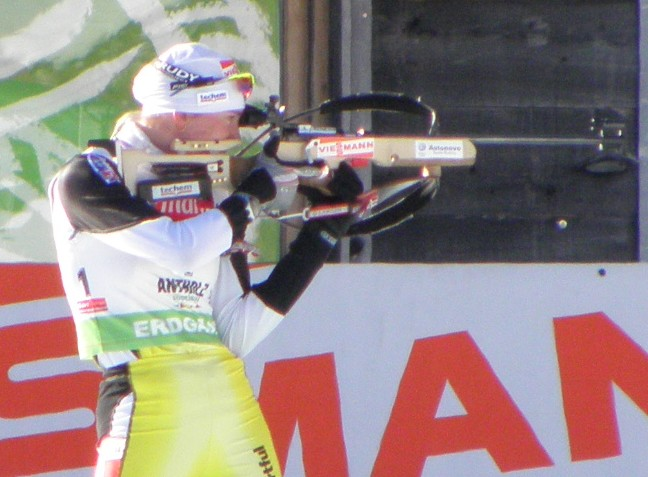
Anastasia Kuzmina - shooting

The 2010–11 Biathlon World Cup - World Cup 2 was held in Hochfilzen, Austria, from 10 December until 12 December 2010.

== Schedule of events ==
The time schedule of the event stands below

Date	Time	Events
December 10	11:30 CET	Men's 10 km Sprint
December 10	14:30 CET	Women's 7.5 km Sprint
December 11	10:45 CET	Men's 12.5 km Pursuit
December 11	14:15 CET	Women's 4 x 6 km Relay
December 12	11:00 CET	Men's 4 x 7.5 km Relay
December 12	14:15 CET	Women's 10 km Pursuit

== Medal winners ==
=== Men ===
Event:	Gold:	Time	Silver:	Time	Bronze:	Time
10 km Sprint details	Tarjei Bø; Norway	28:17.6 (0+0)	Serguei Sednev; Ukraine	28:45.1 (0+1)	Alexis Bœuf; France	28:50.9 (0+1)
12.5 km Pursuit details	Tarjei Bø; Norway	36:32.4 (0+0+0+1)	Simon Eder; Austria	37:11.1 (0+0+0+0)	Ivan Tcherezov; Russia	37:12.4 (1+0+0+1)
4 x 7.5 km Relay details	Norway; Alexander Os; Ole Einar Bjørndalen; Emil Hegle Svendsen; Tarjei Bø	1:29:38.2 (1+3) (0+1) (0+0) (0+0) (0+0) (0+1) (0+2) (0+0)	Austria; Daniel Mesotitsch; Tobias Eberhard; Christoph Sumann; Dominik Landertinger	1:30:31.3 (0+1) (0+1) (0+0) (0+1) (0+0) (0+0) (0+0) (0+1)	France; Vincent Jay; Jean-Guillaume Béatrix; Lois Habert; Martin Fourcade	1:33:07.0 (0+0) (0+1) (0+1) (0+0) (0+1) (1+3) (1+3) (0+0)

=== Women ===
Event:	Gold:	Time	Silver:	Time	Bronze:	Time
7.5 km Sprint details	Anastasiya Kuzmina; Slovakia	25:30.6 (0+0)	Darya Domracheva; Belarus	25:50.4 (0+1)	Kaisa Mäkäräinen; Finland	25:54.4 (0+1)
4 x 6 km Relay details	Germany; Kathrin Hitzer; Magdalena Neuner; Sabrina Buchholz; Andrea Henkel	1:16:22.5 (0+1) (0+2) (0+0) (0+1) (0+1) (0+2) (0+1) (0+1)	Ukraine; Oksana Khvostenko; Olena Pidhrushna; Vita Semerenko; Valj Semerenko	1:17:21.6 (0+2) (0+2) (0+1) (0+0) (0+0) (0+0) (0+1) (0+2)	Norway; Synnøve Solemdal; Ann Kristin Flatland; Fanny Welle-Strand Horn; Tora Berger	1:17:30.9 (0+1) (0+2) (0+1) (0+2) (0+3) (0+0) (0+0) (0+0)
10 km Pursuit details	Helena Ekholm; Sweden	35:17.8 (0+1+0+0)	Kaisa Mäkäräinen; Finland	35:49.8 (0+0+0+2)	Darya Domracheva; Belarus	36:04.1 (0+0+1+2)

== Achievements ==
Best performance for all time

- Tarjei Bø (NOR), 1st place in Sprint and Pursuit
- Lukas Hofer (ITA), 7th place in Sprint
- Krasimir Anev (BUL), 12th place in Sprint
- Matej Kazar (SVK), 21st place in Sprint
- Olexandr Batiuk (UKR), 37th place in Sprint
- Martin Otcenas (SVK), 53rd place in Sprint
- Nathan Smith (CAN), 48th place in Pursuit
- Sara Studebaker (USA), 26th place in Sprint
- Fanny Welle-Strand Horn (NOR), 30th place in Sprint
- Monika Hojnisz (POL), 33rd place in Sprint
- Jialing Tang (CHN), 40th place in Sprint and 35th place in Pursuit
- Luminita Piscoran (ROU), 61st place in Sprint
- Romana Schrempf (AUT), 63rd place in Sprint
- Zanna Juskane (LAT), 64th place in Sprint
- Jana Gerekova (SVK), 21st place in Pursuit
- Nastassia Dubarezava (BLR), 49th place in Pursuit

First World Cup race

- Vladimir Alenishko (BLR), 79th place in Sprint
- Zvonimir Tadejevic (CRO), 102nd place in Sprint
- Yinghui Xu (CHN), 54th place in Sprint
- Nastassia Dubarezava (BLR), 55th place in Sprint
- Iryna Nafranovich (BLR), 96th place in Sprint
