= 2010–11 Biathlon World Cup – World Cup 3 =

Coordinates: 46°21′N 14°01′E

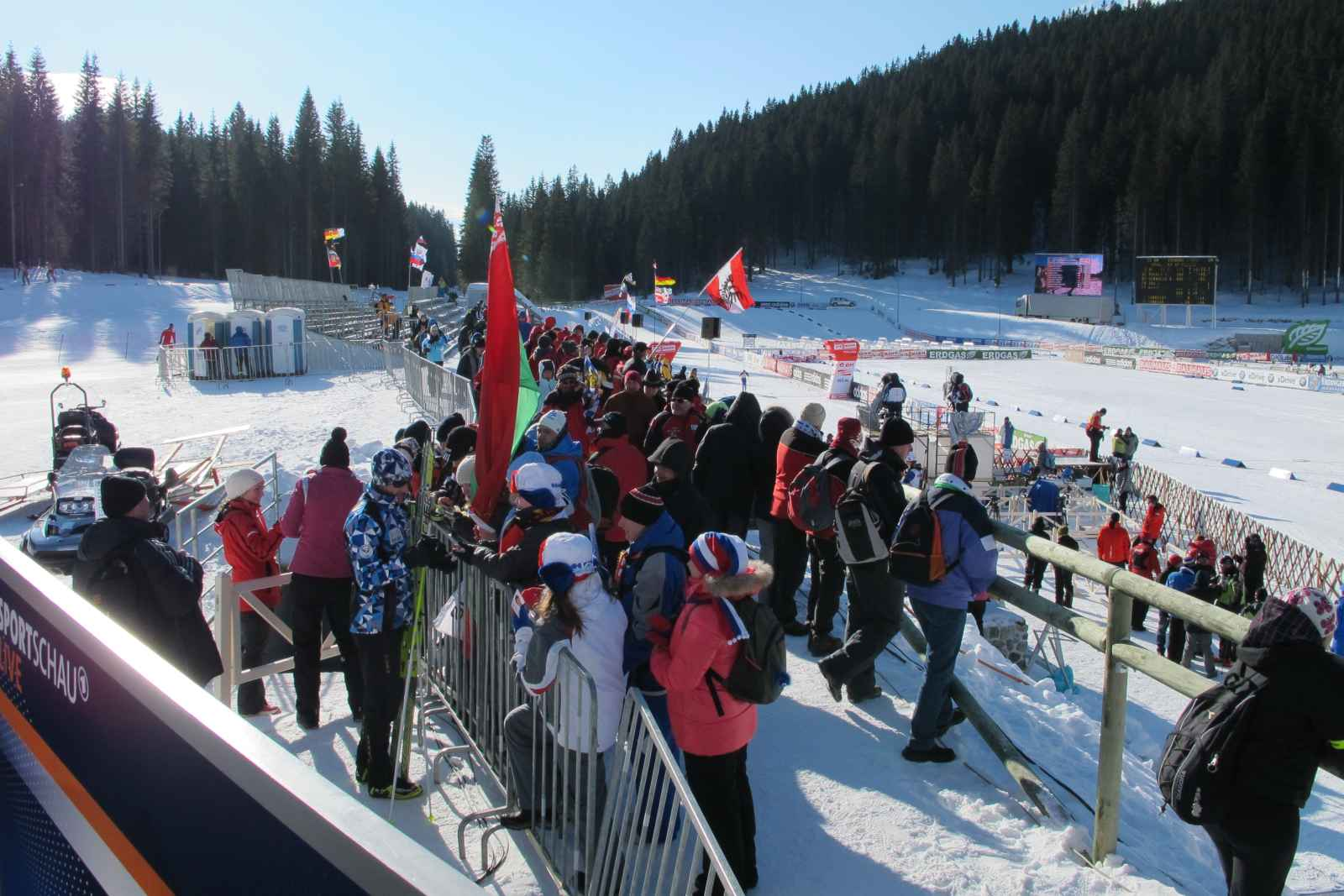
Pokljuka biathlon world cup in 2010

The 2010–11 Biathlon World Cup - World Cup 3 was held in Pokljuka, Slovenia, from 16 December until 19 December 2010.

== Schedule of events ==
The time schedule of the event stands below

Date	Time	Events
December 16	10:30 CET	Men's 20 km Individual
December 16	14:15 CET	Women's 15 km Individual
December 18	11:15 CET	Men's 10 km Sprint
December 18	14:00 CET	Women's 7.5 km Sprint
December 19	12:15 CET	Mixed Relay

== Medal winners ==
=== Men ===
Event:	Gold:	Time	Silver:	Time	Bronze:	Time
20 km Individual details	Daniel Mesotitsch; Austria	52:05.6 (1+0+0+0)	Benjamin Weger; Switzerland	53:04.0 (0+0+1+0)	Serguei Sednev; Ukraine	53:26.8 (1+0+0+1)
10 km Sprint details	Björn Ferry; Sweden	27:25.9 (0+0)	Tarjei Bø; Norway	27:31.0 (1+0)	Michael Greis; Germany	27:34.6 (0+0)

=== Women ===
Event:	Gold:	Time	Silver:	Time	Bronze:	Time
15 km Individual details	Tora Berger; Norway	42:47.0 (0+0+0+0)	Kaisa Mäkäräinen; Finland	42:48.8 (0+0+0+1)	Marie-Laure Brunet; France	43:22.3 (0+0+0+0)
7.5 km Sprint details	Magdalena Neuner; Germany	23:05.2 (0+2)	Anastasiya Kuzmina; Slovakia	23:16.4 (0+1)	Kaisa Mäkäräinen; Finland; Olga Zaitseva; Russia	23:22.2 (1+0); 23:22.2 (0+0)

=== Mixed ===
Event:	Gold:	Time	Silver:	Time	Bronze:	Time
2 x 6 km + 2 x 7.5 km Relay details	Sweden; Helena Ekholm; Anna Carin Zidek; Fredrik Lindström; Carl Johan Bergman	1:17:52.0 (0+1) (0+0) (0+0) (0+2) (0+0) (0+2) (0+3) (0+2)	Ukraine; Olena Pidhrushna; Vita Semerenko; Serhiy Semenov; Serguei Sednev	1:17:52.3 (0+2) (0+1) (0+0) (0+2) (0+1) (0+0) (0+0) (0+1)	France; Marie-Laure Brunet; Marie Dorin; Vincent Jay; Martin Fourcade	1:17:53.3 (0+0) (0+1) (0+0) (0+1) (0+3) (0+2) (0+3) (0+0)

== Achievements ==
Best performance for all time

- Benjamin Weger (SUI), 2nd place in Individual
- Miroslav Matiaško (SVK), 6th place in Individual
- Michail Kletcherov (BUL), 17th place in Individual
- Scott Perras (CAN), 31st place in Individual and Sprint
- Nikolay Braichenko (KAZ), 45th place in Individual
- Lee-Steve Jackson (GBR), 49th place in Individual
- Je-Uk Jun (KOR), 84th place in Individual
- Zvonimir Tadejevic (CRO), 99th place in Individual
- Lukas Hofer (ITA), 6th place in Sprint
- Yan Savitskiy (KAZ), 22nd place in Sprint
- Miroslaw Kobus (POL), 54th place in Sprint
- Marina Lebedeva (KAZ), 6th place in Individual
- Sara Studebaker (USA), 21st place in Individual
- Monika Hojnisz (POL), 22nd place in Individual
- Kari Eie (NOR), 23rd place in Individual
- Barbora Tomesova (CZE), 33rd place in Individual and 22nd place in Sprint
- Amanda Lightfoot (GBR), 57th place in Individual
- Anais Bescond (FRA), 5th place in Sprint
- Luminita Piscoran (ROU), 60th place in Sprint

First World Cup race

- Florian Graf (GER), 84th place in Sprint
- Rolands Puzulis (LAT), 98th place in Sprint
- Annalies Cook (USA), 59th place in Sprint
