= 2010–11 Biathlon World Cup – World Cup 4 =

Coordinates: 50°42′N 10°43′E

The 2010–11 Biathlon World Cup - World Cup 4 was held in Oberhof, Germany, from 5 January until 9 January 2011.

== Schedule of events ==
The time schedule of the event stands below

Date	Time	Events
January 5	17:30 CET	Men's 4 x 7.5 km Relay
January 6	19:30 CET	Women's 4 x 6 km Relay
January 7	17:30 CET	Men's 10 km Sprint
January 8	17:40 CET	Women's 7.5 km Sprint
January 9	15:30 CET	Men's 15 km Mass start
January 9	18:10 CET	Women's 12.5 km Mass Start

== Medal winners ==
=== Men ===
Event:	Gold:	Time	Silver:	Time	Bronze:	Time
4 x 7.5 km Relay details	Germany; Christoph Stephan; Alexander Wolf; Arnd Peiffer; Michael Greis	1:23:53.0 (1+3) (0+0) (1+3) (0+0) (0+2) (0+2) (0+3) (0+3)	Czech Republic; Zdeněk Vítek; Jaroslav Soukup; Ondřej Moravec; Michal Šlesingr	1:26:15.8 (0+1) (0+0) (0+2) (1+3) (1+3) (0+0) (0+2) (1+3)	Norway; Alexander Os; Lars Berger; Rune Brattsveen; Ole Einar Bjørndalen	1:26:17.0 (0+2) (2+3) (0+1) (4+3) (0+1) (0+2) (0+0) (0+2)
10 km Sprint details	Tarjei Bø; Norway	25:49.7 (0+1)	Arnd Peiffer; Germany	26:06.4 (0+1)	Michal Šlesingr; Czech Republic	26:10.4 (0+0)
15 km Mass Start details	Tarjei Bø; Norway	39:51.3 (0+1+0+1)	Emil Hegle Svendsen; Norway	39:53.7 (1+0+2+0)	Ivan Tcherezov; Russia	39:55.4 (0+0+1+1)

=== Women ===
Event:	Gold:	Time	Silver:	Time	Bronze:	Time
4 x 6 km Relay details	Sweden; Jenny Jonsson; Anna Carin Olofsson-Zidek; Anna Maria Nilsson; Helena Ekholm	1:17:53.1 (0+1) (0+0) (0+0) (1+3) (0+1) (0+2) (0+1) (0+0)	France; Anais Bescond; Marie Dorin; Pauline Macabies; Marie Laure Brunet	1:18:45.4 (0+2) (0+2) (0+0) (0+0) (0+0) (3+3) (0+0) (0+2)	Belarus; Nadezhda Skardino; Darya Domracheva; Nadzeya Pisareva; Liudmila Kalinchik	1:19:24.5 (0+0) (1+3) (0+0) (0+3) (0+2) (0+2) (0+2) (0+1)
7.5 km Sprint details	Ann Kristin Flatland; Norway	23:29.5 (1+0)	Magdalena Neuner; Germany	23:35.2 (1+1)	Andrea Henkel; Germany	23:44.7 (0+1)
12.5 km Mass Start details	Helena Ekholm; Sweden	39:22.9 (0+0+0+0)	Andrea Henkel; Germany	39:24.5 (0+1+1+0)	Svetlana Sleptsova; Russia	39:28.1 (0+0+0+0)

== Achievements ==
Best performance for all time

- Lois Habert (FRA), 10th place in Sprint
- Andrejs Rastorgujevs (LAT), 40th place in Sprint
- Vladimir Alenishko (BLR), 50th place in Sprint
- Pete Beyer (GBR), 87th place in Sprint
- Ann Kristin Flatland (NOR), 1st place in Sprint
- Ekaterina Yurlova (RUS), 6th place in Sprint
- Laura Spector (USA), 19th place in Sprint
- Xu Yinghui (CHN), 33rd place in Sprint
- Nadzeya Pisareva (BLR), 35th place in Sprint
- Nastassia Dubarezava (BLR), 46th place in Sprint
- Dorothea Wierer (ITA), 65th place in Sprint
- Martina Chrapanova (SVK), 67th place in Sprint
- Victoria Padial Hernandez (ESP), 77th place in Sprint
- Laura Toivanen (FIN), 79th place in Sprint

First World Cup race

- Ludwig Ehrhart (FRA), 86th place in Sprint
- Ivan Zlatev (BUL), 91st place in Sprint
- Su-Young Lee (KOR), 96th place in Sprint
- Toms Praulitis (LAT), 97th place in Sprint
- Lea Johanidesova (CZE), 50th place in Sprint
- Wang Yue (CHN), 70th place in Sprint
- Daria Yurlova (EST), 80th place in Sprint
