= Kari Henneseid Eie =

Norwegian biathlete

Kari Henneseid Eie (born 2 July 1982) is a retired Norwegian biathlete.

Competing at the 2003 Junior World Championships, 27th was her best placement among the three events. She made her Biathlon World Cup debut in the 2004–05 season. Her first race was a 63rd place in Oberhof, breaking the top 30 for the first time two years later, when finishing 28th in Östersund. Her career best was a 22nd place in December 2010 in Pokljuka. Her last World Cup outing came in February 2011 in Fort Kent.

As a cross-country skier she managed a 15th place at the 2012 Norwegian Championships in 10 km as her best result. She represented IL Varden.
