= 2010–11 Biathlon World Cup – World Cup 6 =

Coordinates: 46°47′N 12°03′E

The 2010–11 Biathlon World Cup - World Cup 6 was held in Antholz, Italy, from 20 January until 23 January 2011.

== Schedule of events ==
The time schedule of the event stands below

Date	Time	Events
January 20	14:30 CET	Men's 10 km Sprint
January 21	14:30 CET	Women's 7.5 km Sprint
January 22	13:00 CET	Women's 4 x 6 km Relay
January 22	15:30 CET	Men's 15 km Mass Start
January 23	12:45 CET	Women's 12.5 km Mass Start
January 23	15:15 CET	Men's 4 x 7.5 km Relay

== Medal winners ==
=== Men ===
Event:	Gold:	Time	Silver:	Time	Bronze:	Time
10 km Sprint details	Anton Shipulin; Russia	23:36.2 (0+0)	Michael Greis; Germany	23:46.2 (0+0)	Lars Berger; Norway	23:56.7 (0+1)
15 km Mass Start details	Martin Fourcade; France	35:33.4 (0+0+1+0)	Björn Ferry; Sweden	35:50.6 (0+0+1+1)	Anton Shipulin; Russia	35:51.0 (1+1+0+0)
4 x 7.5 km Relay details	Germany; Christoph Stephan; Daniel Böhm; Arnd Peiffer; Michael Greis	1:10:17.2 (0+1) (0+0) (0+0) (0+2) (0+2) (0+0) (0+0) (0+2)	Italy; Christian de Lorenzi; Rene Laurent Vuillermoz; Lukas Hofer; Markus Windisch	1:10:35.8 (0+2) (0+1) (0+0) (0+1) (0+0) (0+3) (0+0) (0+2)	Norway; Emil Hegle Svendsen; Ole Einar Bjørndalen; Alexander Os; Tarjei Bø	1:10:45.4 (0+1) (0+1) (0+0) (0+0) (0+0) (0+2) (0+1) (0+3)

=== Women ===
Event:	Gold:	Time	Silver:	Time	Bronze:	Time
7.5 km Sprint details	Tora Berger; Norway	20:08.1 (0+0)	Anastasiya Kuzmina; Slovakia	20:37.2 (0+1)	Olga Zaitseva; Russia	20:44.5 (0+1)
4 x 6 km Relay details	Russia; Svetlana Sleptsova; Anna Bogaliy-Titovets; Natalia Guseva; Olga Zaitseva	1:11:14.7 (0+1) (0+0) (0+1) (0+2) (0+0) (0+2) (0+0) (0+0)	Sweden; Jenny Jonsson; Anna Carin Zidek; Anna Maria Nilsson; Helena Ekholm	1:12:11.8 (0+0) (0+0) (0+3) (0+1) (0+1) (0+1) (0+1) (0+0)	Germany; Sabrina Buchholz; Kathrin Hitzer; Miriam Gössner; Andrea Henkel	1:13:34.8 (2+3) (0+0) (0+0) (0+2) (0+1) (2+3) (0+1) (0+3)
12.5 km Mass Start details	Tora Berger; Norway	33:56.3 (0+1+0+1)	Marie Laure Brunet; France	33:56.9 (0+0+0+1)	Darya Domracheva; Belarus	34:02.1 (0+0+0+0)

== Achievements ==
Best performance for all time

- Anton Shipulin (RUS), 1st place in Sprint
- Fredrik Lindström (SWE), 8th place in Sprint
- Andrejs Rastorgujevs (LAT), 20th place in Sprint
- Remus Faur (ROU), 89th place in Sprint
- Toms Praulitis (LAT), 95th place in Sprint
- Jenny Jonsson (SWE), 15th place in Sprint
- Nina Klenovska (BUL), 25th place in Sprint
- Tang Jialin (CHN), 33rd place in Sprint
- Anna Karin Strömstedt (SWE), 42nd place in Sprint
- Martina Chrapanova (SVK), 63rd place in Sprint

First World Cup race

- Evgeniy Garanichev (RUS), 13th place in Sprint
- Daniel Taschler (ITA), 85th place in Sprint
- Peter Kazar (SVK), 90th place in Sprint
