= 2010–11 Biathlon World Cup – World Cup 1 =

Coordinates: 63°11′N 14°38′E

The 2010–11 Biathlon World Cup - World Cup 1 was the opening event of the season and was held in Östersund, Sweden, from 1 December until 5 December 2010.

== Schedule of events ==
The time schedule of the event stands below

| Date | Time | Events |
|---|---|---|
| December 1 | 16:20 CET | Women's 15 km Individual |
| December 2 | 17:20 CET | Men's 20 km Individual |
| December 3 | 17:20 CET | Women's 7.5 km Sprint |
| December 4 | 14:15 CET | Men's 10 km Sprint |
| December 5 | 11:30 CET | Women's 10 km Pursuit |
| December 5 | 14:15 CET | Men's 12.5 km Pursuit |

== Medal winners ==
=== Men ===
| Event: | Gold: | Time | Silver: | Time | Bronze: | Time |
|---|---|---|---|---|---|---|
| 20 km Individual details | Emil Hegle Svendsen; Norway | 55:07.7 (0+1+0+1) | Ole Einar Bjørndalen; Norway | 55:26.8 (0+0+0+2) | Martin Fourcade; France | 55:45.5 (0+1+0+0) |
| 10 km Sprint details | Emil Hegle Svendsen; Norway | 25:01.0 (1+0) | Ole Einar Bjørndalen; Norway | 25:05.8 (0+0) | Martin Fourcade; France | 25:16.2 (0+0) |
| 12.5 km Pursuit details | Ole Einar Bjørndalen; Norway | 35:47.7 (0+0+1+1) | Emil Hegle Svendsen; Norway | 36:13.9 (0+0+1+2) | Jakov Fak; Slovenia | 36:48.4 (1+2+0+0) |

=== Women ===
| Event: | Gold: | Time | Silver: | Time | Bronze: | Time |
|---|---|---|---|---|---|---|
| 15 km Individual details | Anna Carin Zidek; Sweden | 45:26.1 (0+0+0+0) | Marie-Laure Brunet; France | 45:35.0 (1+0+0+1) | Helena Ekholm; Sweden | 46:08.8 (1+0+0+1) |
| 7.5 km Sprint details | Kaisa Mäkäräinen; Finland | 22:42.1 (0+0) | Miriam Gössner; Germany | 23:00.8 (0+0) | Darya Domracheva; Belarus | 23:29.2 (1+0) |
| 10 km Pursuit details | Kaisa Mäkäräinen; Finland | 31:57.1 (0+0+0+0) | Miriam Gössner; Germany | 33:22.4 (0+1+1+1) | Helena Ekholm; Sweden | 33:38.6 (0+1+0+1) |

== Achievements ==
Best performance for all time

- Krasimir Anev (BUL), 18th place in Individual
- Leif Nordgren (USA), 35th place in Individual
- Christian Stebler (SUI), 39th place in Individual and 33rd in Pursuit
- Tobias Arwidson (SWE), 40th place in Individual
- Roland Gerbacea (ROU), 46th place in Individual
- Edin Hodzic (SRB), 95th place in Individual
- Lukas Hofer (ITA), 10th place in Sprint and 7th place in Pursuit
- Satoru Abe (JPN), 68 place in Sprint
- Ahti Toivanen (FIN), 86th place in Sprint
- Matti Hakala (FIN), 91st place in Sprint
- Paulina Bobak (POL), 14th place in Individual
- Laura Spector (USA), 25th place in Individual
- Sophie Boilley (FRA), 30th place in Individual
- Inna Suprun (UKR), 32nd place in Individual
- Olga Poltoranina (KAZ), 37th place in Individual and 35th place in Sprint
- Miriam Gössner (GER), 39th place in Individual, 2nd place in Sprint and Pursuit
- Fanny Welle-Strand Horn (NOR), 42nd place in Individual
- Jo In-Hee (KOR), 62nd place in Individual
- Jana Gereková (SVK), 24th place in Sprint
- Nadzeya Pisareva (BLR), 41st place in Sprint
- Romana Schrempf (AUT), 74th place in Sprint
- Ekaterina Yurlova (RUS), 12th place in Pursuit

First World Cup race

- Vladimir Semakov (RUS), 61st place in Individual
- Matti Hakala (FIN), 93rd place in Individual
- Nadzeya Pisareva (BLR), 42nd place in Individual
- Monika Hojnisz (POL), 44th place in Individual
- Tang Jialin (CHN), 45th place in Individual
- Claire Breton (FRA), 53rd place in Individual
- Luminita Piscoran (ROU), 79th place in Individual
- Martina Chrapanova (SVK), 85th place in Individual
- Xu Yinghui (CHN), 90th place in Individual
- Anna Karin Strömstedt (SWE), 61st place in Sprint
