= 2010–11 Biathlon World Cup – World Cup 5 =

Coordinates: 47°46′N 12°39′E

The 2010–11 Biathlon World Cup - World Cup 5 was held in Ruhpolding, Germany, from 12 January until 16 January 2011.

== Schedule of events ==
The time schedule of the event stands below

Date	Time	Events
January 12	14:15 CET	Men's 20 km Individual
January 13	14:15 CET	Women's 15 km Individual
January 14	14:45 CET	Men's 10 km Sprint
January 15	14:45 CET	Women's 7.5 km Sprint
January 16	13:15 CET	Men's 12.5 km Pursuit
January 16	15:15 CET	Women's 10 km Pursuit

== Medal winners ==
=== Men ===
Event:	Gold:	Time	Silver:	Time	Bronze:	Time
20 km Individual details	Emil Hegle Svendsen; Norway	50:39.4 (0+0+0+1)	Martin Fourcade; France	50:46.8 (0+0+0+1)	Dominik Landertinger; Austria	51:03.1 (0+0+0+1)
10 km Sprint details	Lars Berger; Norway	23:55.1 (0+0)	Martin Fourcade; France	24:16.8 (0+0)	Ivan Tcherezov; Russia	24:18.9 (0+0)
12.5 km Pursuit details	Björn Ferry; Sweden	31:56.6 (0+0+0+0)	Martin Fourcade; France	32:01.5 (0+1+1+0)	Michael Greis; Germany	32:03.5 (0+0+0+0)

=== Women ===
Event:	Gold:	Time	Silver:	Time	Bronze:	Time
15 km Individual details	Olga Zaitseva; Russia	41:46.1 (0+0+0+0)	Andrea Henkel; Germany	42:00.6 (0+0+0+0)	Helena Ekholm; Sweden	42:23.5 (0+0+0+0)
7.5 km Sprint details	Tora Berger; Norway	20:33.3 (0+0)	Andrea Henkel; Germany	20:34.4 (0+0)	Magdalena Neuner; Germany	20:49.1 (0+1)
10 km Pursuit details	Tora Berger; Norway	28:50.9 (0+0+0+1)	Andrea Henkel; Germany	29:28.6 (0+0+1+1)	Kaisa Mäkäräinen; Finland	29:50.2 (2+0+0+0)

== Achievements ==
Best performance for all time

- Ludwig Ehrhart (FRA), 67th place in Individual
- Tomáš Holubec (CZE), 10th place in Sprint
- Andrejs Rastorgujevs (LAT), 23rd place in Sprint
- Junji Nagai (JPN), 30th place in Sprint
- Edgars Piksons (LAT), 34th place in Sprint
- Łukasz Witek (POL), 85th place in Sprint
- Su-Young Lee (KOR), 92nd place in Sprint
- Claire Breton (FRA), 18th place in Individual
- Marine Bolliet (FRA), 49th place in Individual and 40th place in Sprint
- Itsuka Owada (JPN), 50th place in Individual
- Laura Toivanen (FIN), 68th place in Individual
- Karolina Pitoń (POL), 71st place in Individual
- Dorothea Wierer (ITA), 24th place in Sprint
- Laure Soulie (AND), 35th place in Sprint
- Natsuko Abe (JPN), 46th place in Sprint
- Anna Karin Strömstedt (SWE), 49th place in Sprint and 46th place in Pursuit
- Luminita Piscoran (ROU), 58th place in Sprint

First World Cup race

- Michael Reiter (AUT), 51st place in Individual
- Martin Remmelg (EST), 88th place in Individual
- Remus Faur (ROU), 91st place in Individual
- Lucien Sloof (NED), 96th place in Sprint
- Chardine Sloof (NED), 81st place in Sprint
- Seora Kim (KOR), 88th place in Sprint
