= Wang Yue (biathlete) =

Chinese biathlete (born 1991)

Personal information
- Nationality: Chinese
- Born: 9 April 1991 (age 33)

Sport
- Country: China
- Sport: Biathlon

Wang Yue (born 9 April 1991) is a Chinese biathlete. She competed in the 2014/15 World Cup season, and represented China at the Biathlon World Championships 2015 in Kontiolahti.
