= 2010–11 Biathlon World Cup – World Cup 9 =

Athletic event

Coordinates: 59°56′N 10°17′E

The 2010–11 Biathlon World Cup - World Cup 9 was held in Holmenkollen, Oslo, Norway, from 17 March until 20 March 2011.

== Schedule of events ==
The time schedule of the event stands below

Date	Time	Events
March 17	11:00 CET	Women's 7.5 km Sprint
March 17	14:15 CET	Men's 10 km Sprint
March 19	14:00 CET	Women's 10 km Pursuit
March 19	16:00 CET	Men's 12.5 km Pursuit
March 20	14:00 CET	Women's 12.5 km Mass Start
March 20	16:00 CET	Men's 15 km Mass Start

== Medal winners ==
=== Men ===
Event:	Gold:	Time	Silver:	Time	Bronze:	Time
10 km Sprint details	Andreas Birnbacher; Germany	26:14.6 (0+0)	Björn Ferry; Sweden	26:24.8 (0+0)	Alexander Wolf; Germany	26:58.6 (0+0)
12.5 km Pursuit details	Emil Hegle Svendsen; Norway	32:59.2 (0+2+1+0)	Tarjei Bø; Norway	32:59.8 (0+0+1+0)	Martin Fourcade; France	33:06.5 (1+0+0+0)
15 km Mass Start details	Emil Hegle Svendsen; Norway	39:07.6 (0+1+1+0)	Evgeny Ustyugov; Russia	39:08.0 (0+0+0+1)	Ole Einar Bjørndalen; Norway	39:17.6 (0+1+0+0)

=== Women ===
Event:	Gold:	Time	Silver:	Time	Bronze:	Time
7.5 km Sprint details	Magdalena Neuner; Germany	21:04.6 (0+1)	Tora Berger; Norway	21:35.9 (0+1)	Darya Domracheva; Belarus	21:50.7 (0+2)
10 km Pursuit details	Anastasiya Kuzmina; Slovakia	33:42.5 (0+2+1+0)	Darya Domracheva; Belarus	34:05.6 (2+0+1+2)	Andrea Henkel; Germany	34:10.1 (0+0+1+2)
12.5 km Mass Start details	Darya Domracheva; Belarus	36:13.0 (1+0+0+2)	Anna Bogaliy-Titovets; Russia	36:29.0 (0+0+0+1)	Olga Zaitseva; Russia	36:38.0 (0+0+1+0)

== Achievements ==
Best performance for all time

- Andreas Birnbacher (GER), 1st place in Sprint
- Serhiy Semenov (UKR), 4th place in Sprint
- Fredrik Lindström (SWE), 5th place in Sprint and Pursuit
- Florian Graf (GER), 14th place in Sprint, 12th place in Pursuit and 10th place in Mass Start
- Artem Pryma (UKR), 15th place in Sprint
- Erik Lesser (GER), 40th place in Sprint and 24th in Pursuit
- Ahti Toivanen (FIN), 59th place in Sprint and 55th place in Pursuit
- Michael Reiter (AUT), 41st place in Pursuit
- Fanny Welle-Strand Horn (NOR), 9th place in Sprint
- Nastassia Dubarezava (BLR), 40th place in Sprint
- Ekaterina Yurlova (RUS), 5th place in Pursuit
- Mari Laukkanen (FIN), 25th place in Pursuit
- Nadine Horchler (GER), 27th place in Pursuit
- Bente Landheim (NOR), 45th place in Pursuit
- Tiril Eckhoff (NOR), 46th place in Pursuit

First World Cup race

- Martin Eng (NOR), 67th place in Sprint
- Evgeniya Sedova (RUS), 10th place in Sprint
- Nadine Horchler (GER), 32nd place in Sprint
- Tiril Eckhoff (NOR), 50th place in Sprint
- Bente Landheim (NOR), 55th place in Sprint
