= 2010–11 Biathlon World Cup – World Cup 8 =

The 2010–11 Biathlon World Cup - World Cup 8 was held in Fort Kent, Maine, United States, from 10 February until 13 February 2011.

== Schedule of events ==
The time schedule of the event stands below

Date	Time	Events
February 10	17:30 CET	Men's 10 km Sprint
February 11	17:30 CET	Women's 7.5 km Sprint
February 12	15:15 CET	Men's 12.5 km Pursuit
February 12	18:05 CET	Women's 10 km Pursuit
February 13	16:00 CET	Men's 15 km Mass Start
February 13	18:15 CET	Women's 12.5 km Mass Start

== Medal winners ==
=== Men ===
Event:	Gold:	Time	Silver:	Time	Bronze:	Time
10 km Sprint details	Emil Hegle Svendsen; Norway	24:51.4 (0+1)	Michal Šlesingr; Czech Republic	24:58.6 (0+0)	Tarjei Bø; Norway	25:00.7 (0+0)
12.5 km Pursuit details	Emil Hegle Svendsen; Norway	35:46.0 (0+0+0+1)	Martin Fourcade; France	35:46.0 (0+0+1+0)	Tarjei Bø; Norway	37:03.5 (1+0+0+2)
15 km Mass Start details	Martin Fourcade; France	39:48.9 (0+0+2+0)	Tomasz Sikora; Poland	39:52.0 (0+0+0+0)	Tarjei Bø; Norway	39:53.6 (0+0+1+1)

=== Women ===
Event:	Gold:	Time	Silver:	Time	Bronze:	Time
7.5 km Sprint details	Andrea Henkel; Germany	23:20.0 (0+0)	Miriam Gössner; Germany	23:30.9 (0+2)	Magdalena Neuner; Germany	23:35.8 (1+1)
10 km Pursuit details	Andrea Henkel; Germany	31:09.1 (0+0+1+0)	Magdalena Neuner; Germany	31:33.9 (2+0+0+1)	Marie Dorin; France	32:02.7 (0+0+0+0)
12.5 km Mass Start details	Magdalena Neuner; Germany	39:48.9 (0+0+0+1)	Andrea Henkel; Germany	39:54.2 (0+0+1+0)	Darya Domracheva; Belarus	39:59.3 (1+0+0+0)

== Achievements ==
Best performance for all time

- Julian Eberhard (AUT), 10th place in Sprint
- Scott Perras (CAN), 30th place in Sprint
- Vitaliy Kilchytskyy (UKR), 40th place in Sprint
- Oleksandr Kolos (UKR), 51st place in Sprint
- Artem Ushakov (RUS), 64th place in Sprint
- Nathan Smith (CAN), 38th place in Pursuit
- Fredrik Lindström (SWE), 7th place in Mass Start
- Lowell Bailey (USA), 9th place in Mass Start
- Inna Suprun (UKR), 9th place in Sprint
- Elisabeth Högberg (SWE), 26th place in Sprint
- Anna Karin Strömstedt (SWE), 27th place in Sprint and 24th place in Pursuit
- Claude Godbout (CAN), 48th place in Sprint
- Ekaterina Glazyrina (RUS), 9th place in Pursuit
