= Xu Yinghui =

Chinese cross-country skier (born 1989)

Personal information
- Nationality: Chinese
- Born: 7 January 1989 (age 36)

Sport
- Sport: Cross-country skiing

Xu Yinghui (born 7 January 1989) is a Chinese cross-country skier. She competed in the women's 15 kilometre pursuit at the 2006 Winter Olympics.
