= Sara Studebaker-Hall =

American biathlete (born 1984)

Sara Studebaker-Hall (born October 7, 1984) is a retired biathlete from the United States who competed on the World Cup circuit from 2009 to 2014. Born and raised in Boise, Idaho, she has had multiple top 20 results and her best World Cup finishes are 14th in the sprint event at Presque Isle, Maine in February 2011 and 15th in the sprint at Kontiolahti, Finland in February 2012. She placed 17th in the individual race at the 2011 World Championships in Khanty-Mansiysk, Russia. She was ranked 34th in the World Cup in the 2010–11 season and 55th for 2011–12.

Studebaker, a member of the 2010 Winter Olympic team, placed 34th in the 15 km individual at Whistler Olympic Park, Canada. She has been a member of the U.S. Biathlon Team since 2007, after her graduation from Dartmouth College, where she captained the NCAA champion cross country ski team. Studebaker is a 2003 graduate of Boise High School and learned to ski at Bogus Basin.

Studebaker retired from the sport at the end of the 2013–14 season.

In 2015 she married biathlete Zach Hall.
