= Liudmila Kalinchik =

Belarusian biathlete (born 1982)

Medal record

Representing Belarus

Women's biathlon

World Championships
Silver medal – second place	2008 Östersund	Mixed relay
Bronze medal – third place	2011 Khanty-Mansiysk	4×6 km relay

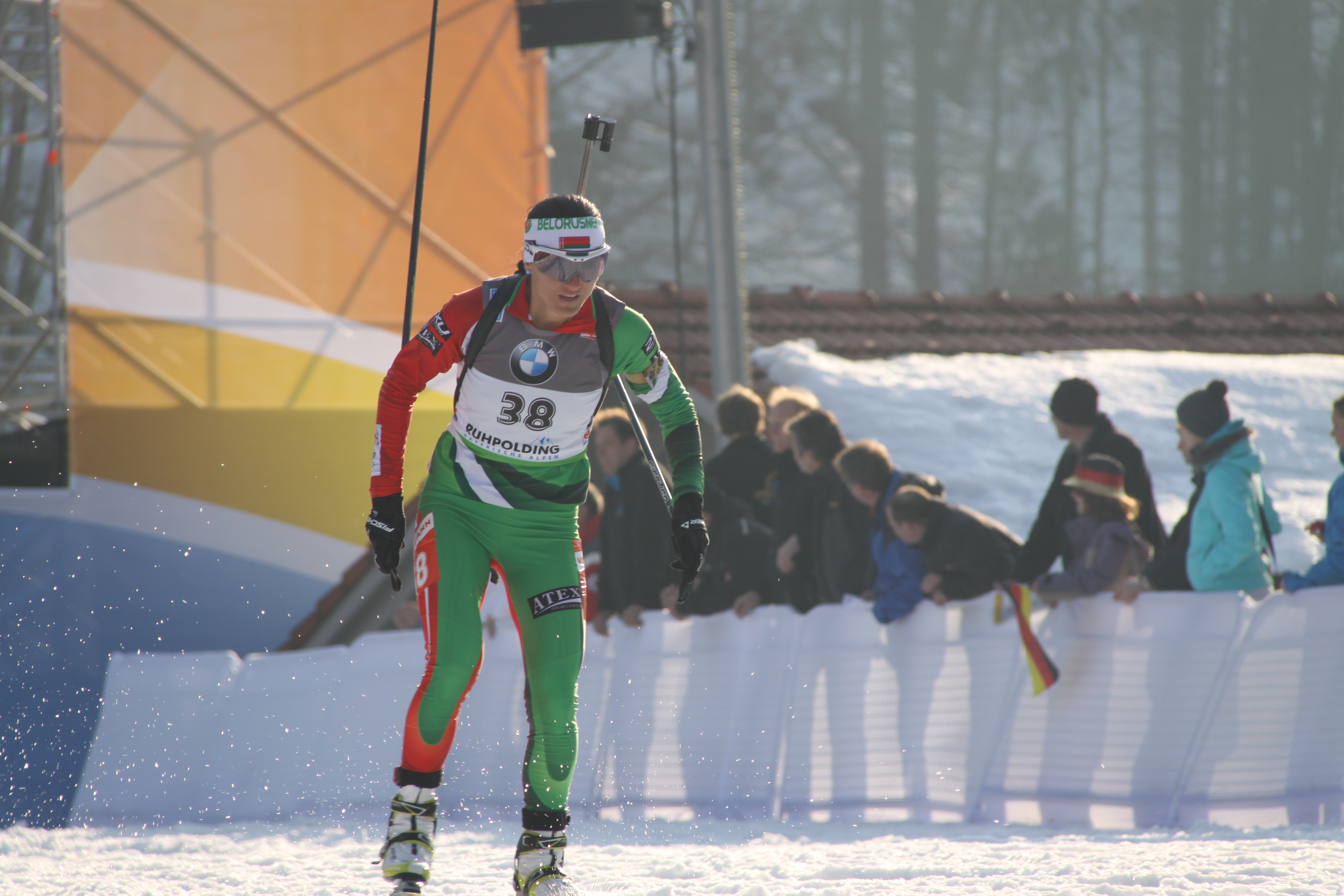

Liudmila Kalinchik (born 23 July 1982) is a retired Belarusian biathlete. She represented Belarus at the 2010 Winter Olympics in Vancouver and at the 2014 Winter Olympics in Sochi.
