= Anna-Karin Strömstedt =

Swedish cross-country skier (born 1981)

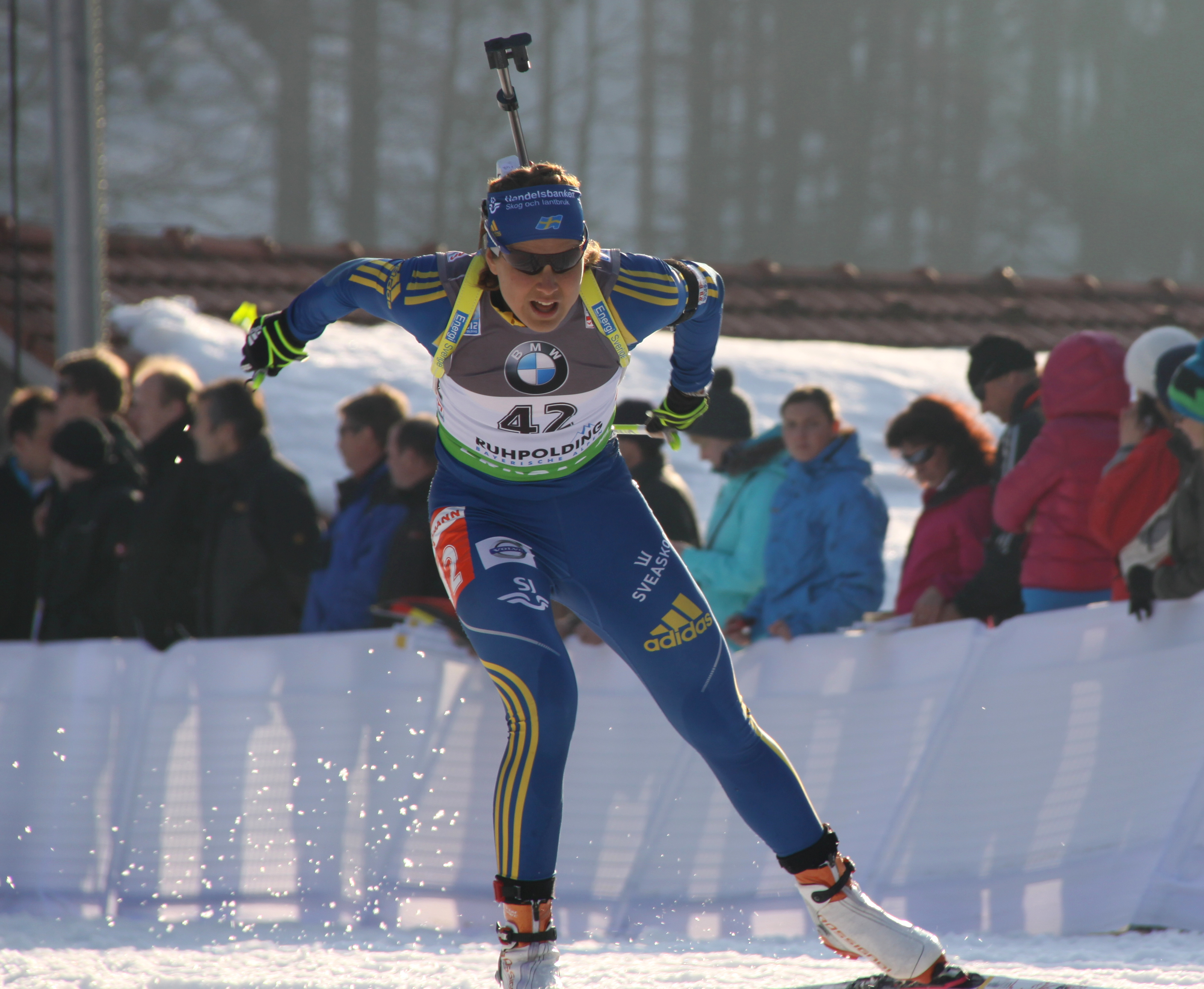
- Strömstedt during IBU World Cup competitions in Ruhpolding, Bavaria, Germany in January 2012

Personal information
- Full name: Anna-Karin Strömstedt Olsson
- Nationality: Sweden
- Born: 1 January 1981 (age 45) Mora, Sweden
- Height: 173 cm (5 ft 8 in)

Sport
- Sport: Skiing
- Club: Vansbro AIK SK

World Cup career
- Seasons: 7 – (1998, 2004–2009)
- Indiv. starts: 34
- Indiv. podiums: 0
- Team starts: 8
- Team podiums: 2
- Team wins: 1
- Overall titles: 0 – (42nd in 2006)
- Discipline titles: 0
Medal record
Women'scross-country skiing
Representing Sweden
Junior World Championships
Gold medal – first place	1998 Pontresina	4 × 5 km relay

Anna-Karin Strömstedt Olsson (born 1 January 1981, in Mora, Dalarna) is a retired Swedish cross-country skier and biathlete who has competed since 1998. Her sole World Cup victory was in a 4 × 5 km relay event in Switzerland in 2007.

At the 2006 Winter Olympics in Turin, Strömstedt Olsson finished fourth in the 4 × 5 km relay, 30th in the 30 km, and 47th in the 7.5 km + 7.5 km double pursuit events. At the FIS Nordic World Ski Championships 2007 in Sapporo, she finished 40th in the 7.5 km + 7.5 km double pursuit event and did not finish the 30 km event.

== Cross-country skiing results ==
All results are sourced from the International Ski Federation (FIS).

=== Olympic Games ===
Year	Age	10 km individual	15 km skiathlon	30 km mass start	Sprint	4 × 5 km relay	Team sprint
2006	25	—	47	30	—	4	—

=== World Championships ===
Year	Age	10 km individual	15 km skiathlon	30 km mass start	Sprint	4 × 5 km relay	Team sprint
2007	26	—	40	DNF	—	—	—

=== World Cup ===
==== Season standings ====
Season	Age	Discipline standings				Ski Tour standings	
Season	Age	Overall	Distance	Long Distance	Sprint	Tour de Ski	World Cup Final
1998	17	NC	—N/a	NC	—	—N/a	—N/a
2004	23	NC	NC	—N/a	—	—N/a	—N/a
2005	24	83	NC	—N/a	59	—N/a	—N/a
2006	25	42	43	—N/a	24	—N/a	—N/a
2007	26	74	87	—N/a	80	26	—N/a
2008	27	NC	—	—N/a	NC	—	—
2009	28	NC	NC	—N/a	—	—	—

==== Team podiums ====
- 1 victory – (1 RL)
- 2 podiums – (1 RL, 1 TS)

No.	Season	Date	Location	Race	Level	Place	Teammate(s)
1	2005–06	18 March 2006	Sapporo, Japan	6 × 0.8 km Team Sprint F	World Cup	3rd	Norgren
2	2006–07	4 February 2007	Davos, Switzerland	4 × 5 km Relay C/F	World Cup	1st	Andersson / Kalla / Norgren
