= Alexander Os =

Norwegian biathlete (born 1980)

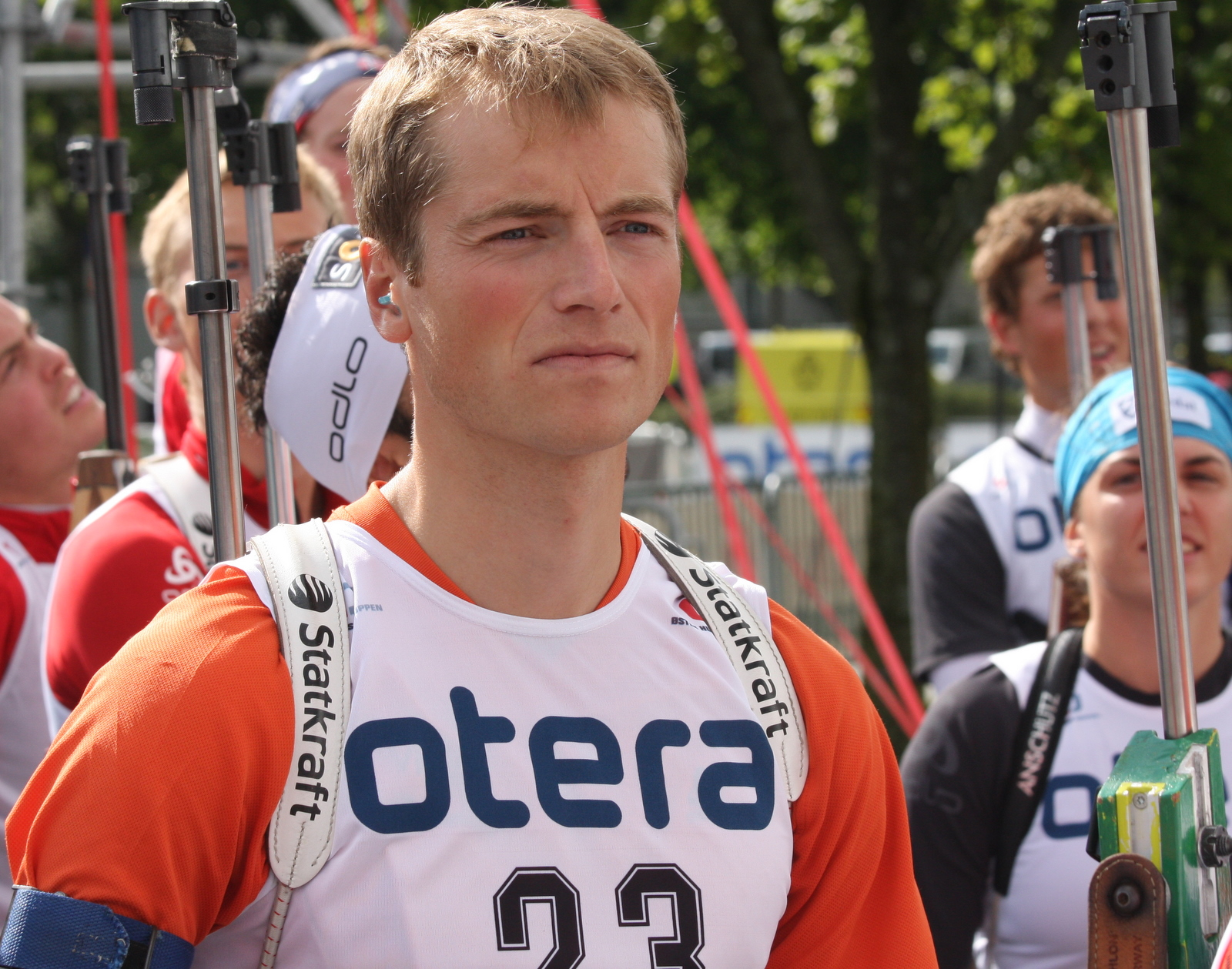
- Os at the Blink festival in Sandnes.

Personal information
- Full name: Alexander Os
- Born: 21 January 1980 (age 46) Fauske, Nordland, Norway
- Height: 1.84 m (6 ft 0 in)

Sport

Professional information
- Sport: Biathlon
- Club: Ishavslaget
- World Cup debut: 9 January 2003
- Retired: 31 May 2016

Olympic Games
- Teams: 1 (2010)
- Medals: 0

World Championships
- Teams: 3 (2008, 2009, 2011)
- Medals: 2 (1 gold)

World Cup
- Seasons: 14 (2002/03–2015/16)
- Individual victories: 0
- All victories: 6
- Individual podiums: 7
- All podiums: 18
Medal record
Men's biathlon
Representing Norway
World Championships
| Gold medal – first place | 2011 Khanty-Mansiysk | 4 × 7.5 km relay |
| Bronze medal – third place | 2009 Pyeongchang | 12.5 km pursuit |

Alexander Os (born 21 January 1980) is a former Norwegian biathlete.

Os announced his retirement after the end of the 2015–16 season.

== Biathlon results ==
All results are sourced from the International Biathlon Union.

=== Olympic Games ===
| Event | Individual | Sprint | Pursuit | Mass start | Relay |
|---|---|---|---|---|---|
| (Canada) 2010 Vancouver | 28th | — | — | — | — |

=== World Championships ===
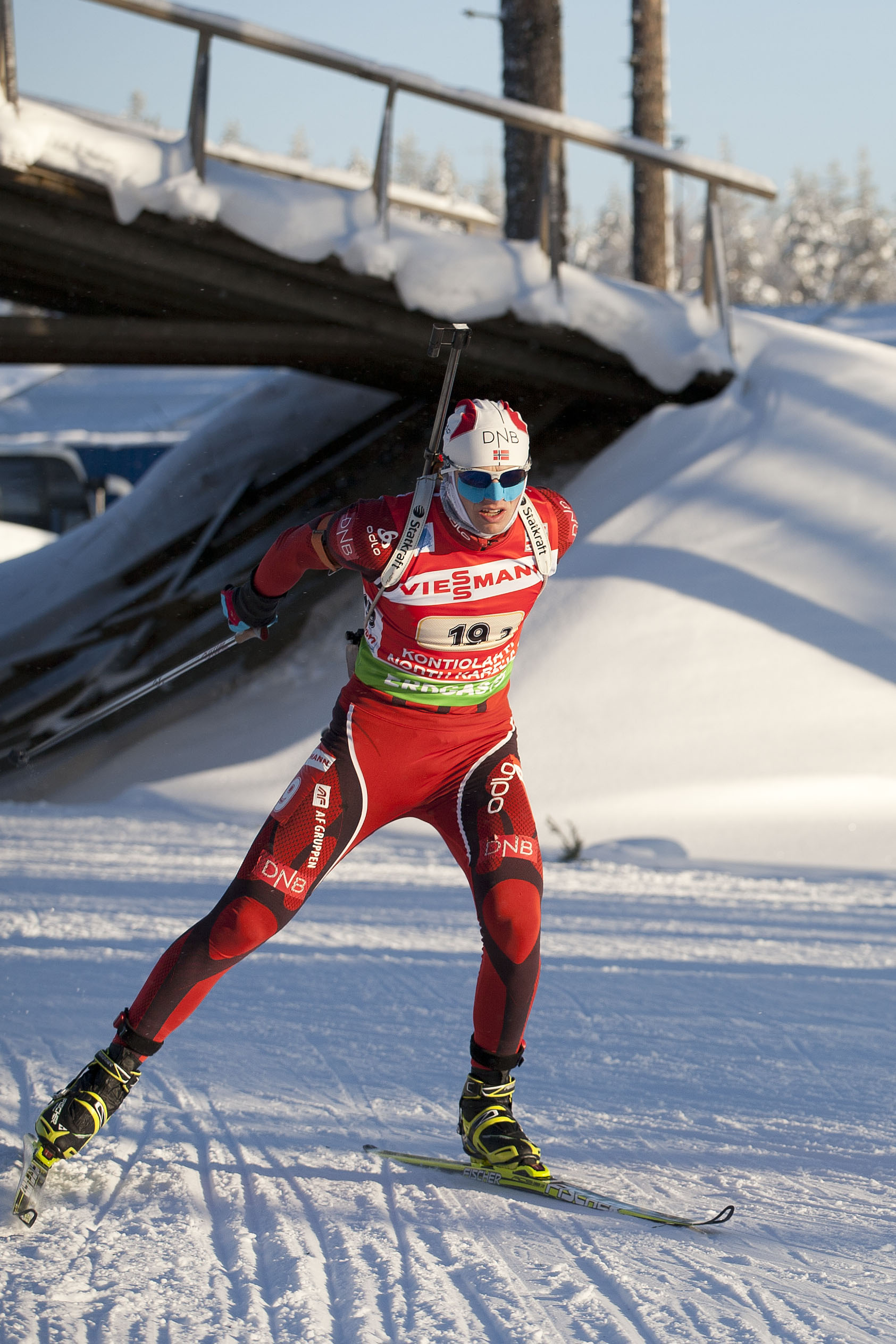
Alexander Os Kontiolahti 2012 01

2 medals (1 gold, 1 bronze)

| Event | Individual | Sprint | Pursuit | Mass start | Relay | Mixed relay |
|---|---|---|---|---|---|---|
| (Sweden) 2008 Östersund | 41st | — | — | — | — | 8th |
| (South Korea) 2009 Pyeongchang | 28th | 4th | Bronze | — | — | — |
| (Russia) 2011 Khanty-Mansiysk | 43rd | — | — | — | Gold | — |

*During Olympic seasons competitions are only held for those events not included in the Olympic program.
