= Sabrina Buchholz =

German biathlete

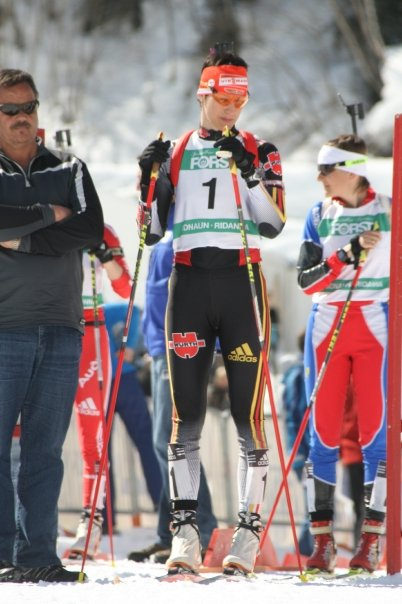

Personal information
- Born: 5 March 1980 (age 46) Schmalkalden, East Germany

Sport

World Cup
- All victories: 4
- All podiums: 6
Medal record
Women's biathlon
Representing Germany
World Championships
Gold medal – first place	2008 Östersund	mixed relay
Junior World Championships
Gold medal – first place	2000 Hochfilzen	7.5 km sprint
Gold medal – first place	2000 Hochfilzen	10 km pursuit
Gold medal – first place	2000 Hochfilzen	3 × 7.5 km relay
Silver medal – second place	2000 Hochfilzen	12.5 km individual

Sabrina Buchholz (born 5 March 1980 in Schmalkalden) is a German biathlete. She is the 2008 world champion in the mixed relay.

== Career highlights ==
IBU World Championships
2008, Östersund, (gold) 1st at team relay (with Neuner / Birnbacher / Greis)
IBU World Junior Championships
2000, Hochfilzen, (gold) 1st at team relay (with Hartleb / Forberger)
2000, Hochfilzen, (silver) 2nd at individual race
2000, Hochfilzen, (gold) 1st at pursuit
2000, Hochfilzen, (gold) 1st at sprint
World Cup
2007, Pokljuka, (gold) 1st at team relay (with Glagow / Neuner / Henkel)
2008, Ruhpolding, (gold) 1st at team relay (with Hitzer / Neuner / Wilhelm)
European Championships
2002, Kontiolahti, (gold) 1st at team relay (with Menzel / Klein / Denkinger)
2004, Minsk, (bronze) 3rd at team relay (with Echter / Menzel / R. Beer)
2005, Novosibirsk, (silver) 2nd at individual race
2006, Langdorf-Arbersee, (bronze) 3rd at team relay (with Adler / Neuner / K. Beer)
2007, Bansko, (silver) 2nd at team relay (with Adler / Müller / Niziak)
European Cup
2003, Geilo, (silver) 2nd at sprint
2003, Geilo, (gold) 1st at pursuit
2003, Ridnaun-Val Ridanna, (gold) 1st at sprint
2004, Meribel, (gold) 1st at team relay (with Echter / Menzel / R. Beer)
2005, Ridnaun-Val Ridanna, (gold) 1st at team relay (with Niziak / Ertl / Denkinger)
2005, Obertilliach, (silver) 2nd at individual race
2006, Martell-Val Martello, (gold) 1st at pursuit
2006, Martell-Val Martello, (silver) 2nd at sprint
2006, Obertilliach, (gold) 1st at pursuit
2006, Obertilliach, (gold) 1st at sprint
2007, Nove Mesto, (bronze) 3rd at pursuit
2007, Nove Mesto, (silver) 2nd at sprint
2007, Haute Maurienne, (gold) 1st sprint
2007, Haute Maurienne, (silver) 2nd pursuit
2007, Ridnaun-Val Ridanna, (gold) 1st sprint
2007, Ridnaun-Val Ridanna, (gold) 1st pursuit
