= Vincent Jay =

French biathlete (born 1985)

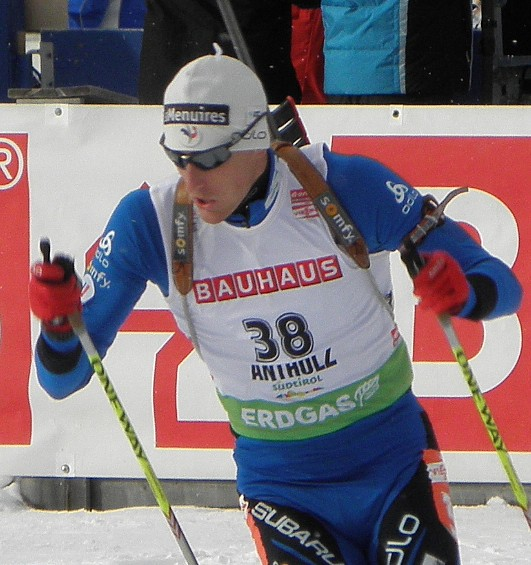

Personal information
- Full name: Vincent Jay
- Born: 18 May 1985 (age 41) Saint-Martin-de-Belleville, France
- Height: 1.82 m (6 ft 0 in)
- Website: vincentjay.com

Sport

Professional information
- Sport: Biathlon
- Club: EMHM Les Ménuires
- World Cup debut: 23 March 2006
- Retired: 9 December 2012

Olympic Games
- Teams: 1 (2010)
- Medals: 2 (1 gold)

World Championships
- Teams: 4 (2008, 2009, 2011, 2012)
- Medals: 0

World Cup
- Seasons: 8 (2005/06–2012/13)
- Individual victories: 2
- All victories: 4
- Individual podiums: 4
- All podiums: 14
Medal record
Men's biathlon
Representing France
Olympic Games
Gold medal – first place	2010 Vancouver	10 km sprint
Bronze medal – third place	2010 Vancouver	12.5 km pursuit
Junior World Championships
Gold medal – first place	2006 Presque Isle	4 × 7.5 km relay
Silver medal – second place	2005 Kontiolahti	4 × 7.5 km relay
Silver medal – second place	2006 Presque Isle	10 km sprint

Vincent Jay (born 18 May 1985) is a former French biathlete and non-commissioned officer. During his career, he won two Olympic medals at the 2010 Winter Olympics in Vancouver - a gold in the sprint and a bronze medal in the pursuit. He was the first Frenchman to win an Olympic sprint Biathlon title. In the World Cup, he has fourteen podiums with two individual victories in Vancouver and two victories as part of relay teams.

== Career ==
He won a gold medal in the 10 km sprint and a Bronze medal in the 12.5 km pursuit at the 2010 Winter Olympics in Vancouver, British Columbia, Canada. Jay also won the 20 km individual race at the 2009 World Cup event in Vancouver.

His Olympic victory came one year after his first victory in World Cup at the same venue. He was not considered a favourite to win gold but was seen as the fourth man in the French team after Vincent Defrasne, and brothers Simon and Martin Fourcade. He caused surprise by winning France's first gold medal at the 2010 Olympic Games. He followed this up with a bronze medal in the pursuit two days later. This event gave him a level of fame in the media for which he wasn't prepared. After two seasons in halftone, he announced his retirement from the sport because of disappointing results in December 2012. In his last race he helped the French team to a second place in a World Cup relay in Hochfilzen.

Jay married alpine skier Marie Marchand-Arvier in June 2014.

Following his retirement, Jay was appointed as the director of the Sports Club of Val d'Isere in July 2014.

== Biathlon results ==
All results are sourced from the International Biathlon Union.

=== Olympic Games ===
2 medals (1 gold, 1 bronze)

Event	Individual	Sprint	Pursuit	Mass start	Relay
(Canada) 2010 Vancouver	10th	Gold	Bronze	10th	5th

*Mass start was added as an event in 2006.

=== World Championships ===
Event	Individual	Sprint	Pursuit	Mass start	Relay	Mixed relay
(Sweden) 2008 Östersund	—	—	—	—	—	7th
(South Korea) 2009 Pyeongchang	23rd	43rd	39th	—	4th	—
(Russia) 2011 Khanty-Mansiysk	19th	45th	56th	—	12th	—
(Germany) 2012 Ruhpolding	29th	—	—	—	—	—

*During Olympic seasons competitions are only held for those events not included in the Olympic program.

=== Individual victories ===
2 victories (1 In, 1 Sp)

Season	Date	Location	Discipline	Level
2008–09; 1 victory (1 In)	11 March 2009	(Canada) Vancouver	20 km individual	Biathlon World Cup
2009–10; 1 victory (1 Sp)	14 February 2010	(Canada) Vancouver	10 km sprint	Winter Olympic Games

*Results are from UIPMB and IBU races which include the Biathlon World Cup, Biathlon World Championships and the Winter Olympic Games.
