= Biathlon World Championships 2012 – Women's sprint =

Women's sprint at the Biathlon World Championships 2012
- Date: 3 March 2012
- Competitors: 116 from 39 nations
- Winning time: 21:07.0

Medalists
gold medal	Magdalena Neuner	Germany
silver medal	Darya Domracheva	Belarus
bronze medal	Vita Semerenko	Ukraine

The women's sprint competition of the Biathlon World Championships 2012 was held on March 3, 2012 at 15:30 local time.

== Results ==
The race started at 15:30.

Rank	Bib	Name	Country	Penalties (P+S)	Time	Deficit
1st place, gold medalist(s)	29	Magdalena Neuner	Germany	0 (0+0)	21:07.0	
2nd place, silver medalist(s)	17	Darya Domracheva	Belarus	0 (0+0)	21:22.2	+15.2
3rd place, bronze medalist(s)	18	Vita Semerenko	Ukraine	0 (0+0)	21:44.6	+37.6
4	6	Helena Ekholm	Sweden	0 (0+0)	21:51.9	+44.9
5	8	Marie-Laure Brunet	France	0 (0+0)	21:53.7	+46.7
6	12	Tora Berger	Norway	1 (0+1)	21:59.4	+52.4
7	22	Svetlana Sleptsova	Russia	0 (0+0)	22:10.5	+1:03.5
8	39	Olga Vilukhina	Russia	0 (0+0)	22:12.3	+1:05.3
9	23	Marie Dorin	France	1 (0+1)	22:20.5	+1:13.5
10	26	Anastasiya Kuzmina	Slovakia	2 (1+1)	22:26.8	+1:19.8
11	1	Teja Gregorin	Slovenia	0 (0+0)	22:31.8	+1:24.8
12	5	Selina Gasparin	Switzerland	0 (0+0)	22:40.1	+1:33.1
13	9	Anna Maria Nilsson	Sweden	0 (0+0)	22:40.3	+1:33.3
14	37	Elise Ringen	Norway	2 (0+2)	22:45.5	+1:38.5
15	21	Mari Laukkanen	Finland	1 (0+1)	22:48.2	+1:41.2
16	11	Olga Zaitseva	Russia	2 (1+1)	22:52.8	+1:45.8
17	33	Magdalena Gwizdoń	Poland	0 (0+0)	22:53.9	+1:46.9
18	3	Zina Kocher	Canada	2 (1+1)	22:55.3	+1:48.3
19	36	Anaïs Bescond	France	1 (0+1)	22:56.8	+1:49.8
20	14	Weronika Nowakowska-Ziemniak	Poland	1 (1+0)	22:57.0	+1:50.0
21	20	Krystyna Pałka	Poland	0 (0+0)	23:02.2	+1:55.2
22	31	Tina Bachmann	Germany	3 (1+2)	23:02.3	+1:55.3
23	13	Michela Ponza	Italy	0 (0+0)	23:10.2	+2:03.2
24	52	Fuyuko Suzuki	Japan	1 (1+0)	23:17.3	+2:10.3
25	2	Veronika Vítková	Czech Republic	3 (1+2)	23:21.5	+2:14.5
26	49	Andreja Mali	Slovenia	1 (0+1)	23:27.0	+2:20.0
27	25	Kaisa Mäkäräinen	Finland	4 (3+1)	23:28.9	+2:21.9
28	38	Liudmila Kalinchik	Belarus	1 (0+1)	23:30.7	+2:23.7
29	40	Franziska Hildebrand	Germany	1 (0+1)	23:31.1	+2:24.1
30	30	Agnieszka Cyl	Poland	1 (0+1)	23:34.5	+2:27.5
31	32	Nadezhda Skardino	Belarus	1 (0+1)	23:35.3	+2:28.3
32	16	Synnøve Solemdal	Norway	4 (2+2)	23:38.4	+2:31.4
33	15	Laure Soulie	Andorra	1 (0+1)	23:42.8	+2:35.8
34	27	Andrea Henkel	Germany	3 (2+1)	23:43.9	+2:36.9
35	7	Nastassia Dubarezava	Belarus	4 (1+3)	23:45.0	+2:38.0
36	92	Amanda Lightfoot	Great Britain	0 (0+0)	23:45.3	+2:38.3
37	45	Miriam Gössner	Germany	4 (2+2)	23:56.0	+2:49.0
37	113	Elena Khrustaleva	Kazakhstan	0 (0+0)	23:56.0	+2:49.0
39	47	Juliya Dzhyma	Ukraine	1 (0+1)	23:56.1	+2:49.1
40	43	Sophie Boilley	France	2 (0+2)	23:56.2	+2:49.2
41	41	Anna Bogaliy-Titovets	Russia	1 (0+1)	23:57.4	+2:50.4
42	54	Emilia Yordanova	Bulgaria	0 (0+0)	23:59.0	+2:52.0
43	4	Kadri Lehtla	Estonia	3 (2+1)	24:03.8	+2:56.8
44	73	Daria Yurlova	Estonia	0 (0+0)	24:05.5	+2:58.5
45	44	Diana Rasimovičiūtė	Lithuania	3 (1+2)	24:07.3	+3:00.3
46	46	Bente Landheim	Norway	2 (2+0)	24:08.6	+3:01.6
47	62	Marina Lebedeva	Kazakhstan	1 (0+1)	24:11.3	+3:04.3
48	35	Katja Haller	Italy	1 (0+1)	24:14.4	+3:07.4
49	34	Natalya Burdyga	Ukraine	4 (2+2)	24:15.8	+3:08.8
49	70	Sara Studebaker	United States	2 (1+1)	24:15.8	+3:08.8
51	19	Megan Imrie	Canada	3 (2+1)	24:18.7	+3:11.7
52	108	Megan Heinicke	Canada	2 (0+2)	24:18.9	+3:11.9
53	24	Jana Gereková	Slovakia	4 (2+2)	24:19.2	+3:12.2
54	58	Ramona Düringer	Austria	0 (0+0)	24:19.7	+3:12.7
55	118	Susan Dunklee	United States	4 (3+1)	24:23.8	+3:16.8
56	42	Anna-Karin Strömstedt	Sweden	3 (1+2)	24:24.8	+3:17.8
57	10	Valj Semerenko	Ukraine	5 (1+4)	24:25.4	+3:18.4
58	76	Réka Ferencz	Romania	0 (0+0)	24:31.4	+3:24.4
59	56	Jenny Jonsson	Sweden	1 (0+1)	24:32.1	+3:25.1
60	59	Yuki Nakajima	Japan	1 (0+1)	24:36.3	+3:29.3
61	116	Dorothea Wierer	Italy	3 (3+0)	24:40.6	+3:33.6
62	115	Annelies Cook	United States	3 (2+1)	24:43.2	+3:36.2
63	48	Olga Poltoranina	Kazakhstan	1 (1+0)	24:43.4	+3:36.4
64	86	Iris Waldhuber	Austria	1 (0+1)	24:43.9	+3:36.9
65	65	Victoria Padial Hernández	Spain	1 (0+1)	24:48.8	+3:41.8
66	69	Martina Chrapánová	Slovakia	1 (0+1)	24:51.0	+3:44.0
67	81	Lanny Barnes	United States	1 (1+0)	24:55.6	+3:48.6
68	51	Darya Usanova	Kazakhstan	4 (1+3)	25:05.8	+3:58.8
69	74	Elisa Gasparin	Switzerland	1 (1+0)	25:07.8	+4:00.8
70	91	Veronika Zvařičová	Czech Republic	3 (0+3)	25:07.9	+4:00.9
71	77	Emőke Szőcs	Hungary	2 (0+2)	25:08.4	+4:01.4
72	87	Žanna Juškāne	Latvia	2 (1+1)	25:13.3	+4:06.3
73	97	Jitka Landová	Czech Republic	2 (1+1)	25:19.3	+4:12.3
74	68	Itsuka Owada	Japan	4 (2+2)	25:24.9	+4:17.9
75	105	Katharina Innerhofer	Austria	2 (1+1)	25:25.3	+4:18.3
76	82	Wang Chunli	China	1 (0+1)	25:28.0	+4:21.0
77	53	Luminita Piscoran	Romania	5 (3+2)	25:29.8	+4:22.8
78	64	Sarah Murphy	New Zealand	1 (0+1)	25:33.1	+4:26.1
79	101	Nicole Gontier	Italy	4 (0+4)	25:33.5	+4:26.5
80	99	Song Chaoqing	China	2 (1+1)	25:37.4	+4:30.4
81	72	Sanna Markkanen	Finland	2 (1+1)	25:39.5	+4:32.5
82	93	Grete Gaim	Estonia	2 (0+2)	25:40.5	+4:33.5
83	28	Éva Tófalvi	Romania	3 (1+2)	25:43.2	+4:36.2
84	83	Nina Klenovska	Bulgaria	3 (0+3)	25:44.8	+4:37.8
85	57	Barbora Tomešová	Czech Republic	5 (4+1)	25:47.7	+4:40.7
86	88	Paulina Fialkova	Slovakia	3 (2+1)	25:52.2	+4:45.2
87	98	Kim Seon-su	South Korea	3 (1+2)	25:54.8	+4:47.8
88	50	Kristel Viigipuu	Estonia	4 (0+4)	25:58.4	+4:51.4
89	78	Natalija Kočergina	Lithuania	5 (4+1)	26:05.8	+4:58.8
90	55	Tang Jialin	China	2 (1+1)	26:07.5	+5:00.5
91	80	Zhang Yan	China	1 (1+0)	26:09.9	+5:02.9
92	79	Niya Dimitrova	Bulgaria	4 (3+1)	26:28.0	+5:21.0
93	96	Naoko Azegami	Japan	6 (2+4)	26:31.3	+5:24.3
94	106	Desislava Stoyanova	Bulgaria	4 (2+2)	26:31.9	+5:24.9
95	103	Baiba Bendika	Latvia	2 (1+1)	26:38.5	+5:31.5
96	75	Lili Drčar	Slovenia	4 (2+2)	26:39.9	+5:32.9
97	89	Kim Kyung-nam	South Korea	2 (1+1)	26:41.2	+5:34.2
98	84	Kim Seo-ra	South Korea	4 (1+3)	26:42.4	+5:35.4
99	111	Aliona Sabaliauskiene	Lithuania	1 (0+1)	26:46.8	+5:39.8
100	85	Eevamari Oksanen	Finland	4 (1+3)	26:52.0	+5:45.0
101	104	Florina Ioana Cirstea	Romania	2 (1+1)	27:06.3	+5:59.3
102	63	Adele Walker	Great Britain	5 (3+2)	27:11.3	+6:04.3
103	90	Patricia Jost	Switzerland	5 (1+4)	27:27.7	+6:20.7
104	110	Yolaine Oddou	Canada	5 (3+2)	27:31.5	+6:24.5
105	117	Nerys Jones	Great Britain	4 (2+2)	27:38.0	+6:31.0
106	100	Inga Paskovska	Latvia	3 (1+2)	27:42.3	+6:35.3
107	112	Uiloq Slettemark	Greenland	2 (0+2)	27:44.2	+6:37.2
108	94	Jaqueline Mourão	Brazil	5 (1+4)	28:09.3	+7:02.3
109	66	Tanja Karišik	Bosnia and Herzegovina	2 (1+1)	28:13.7	+7:06.7
110	61	Alexandra Camenscic	Moldova	4 (1+3)	28:15.9	+7:08.9
111	60	Marija Kaznacenko	Lithuania	5 (2+3)	28:16.3	+7:09.3
112	102	Lucy Glanville	Australia	1 (0+1)	28:24.1	+7:17.1
113	71	Anete Brice	Latvia	3 (2+1)	28:35.9	+7:28.9
114	109	Chardine Sloof	Netherlands	4 (2+2)	28:39.6	+7:32.6
115	67	Panagiota Tsakiri	Greece	2 (1+1)	29:23.9	+8:16.9
116	114	Nihan Erdiler	Turkey	5 (2+3)	32:11.1	+11:04.1
	95	Mun Ji-hee	South Korea		DNS	
	107	Fay Potton	Great Britain		DNS	
