= Biathlon World Championships 2013 – Women's sprint =

Women's sprint at the Biathlon World Championships 2013
- Date: 9 February 2013
- Competitors: 115 from 38 nations
- Winning time: 21:02.1

Medalists
gold medal	Olena Pidhrushna	Ukraine
silver medal	Tora Berger	Norway
bronze medal	Vita Semerenko	Ukraine

The Women's sprint event of the Biathlon World Championships 2013 was held on February 9, 2013. 115 athletes participated over a course of 7.5 km.

== Results ==
The race was started at 16:15.

Rank	Bib	Name	Nationality	Time	Penalties (P+S)	Deficit
1st place, gold medalist(s)	34	Olena Pidhrushna	Ukraine	21:02.1	0 (0+0)	
2nd place, silver medalist(s)	35	Tora Berger	Norway	21:08.5	1 (0+1)	+6.4
3rd place, bronze medalist(s)	19	Vita Semerenko	Ukraine	21:24.9	0 (0+0)	+22.8
4	10	Olga Zaitseva	Russia	21:26.6	1 (0+1)	+24.5
5	24	Olga Vilukhina	Russia	21:27.4	0 (0+0)	+25.3
6	11	Miriam Gössner	Germany	21:35.2	2 (2+0)	+33.1
7	4	Krystyna Pałka	Poland	21:36.6	1 (0+1)	+34.5
8	93	Ann Kristin Flatland	Norway	21:37.6	0 (0+0)	+35.5
9	33	Kaisa Mäkäräinen	Finland	21:42.9	2 (2+0)	+40.8
10	50	Veronika Vítková	Czech Republic	21:52.7	0 (0+0)	+50.6
11	72	Jana Gereková	Slovakia	21:53.1	1 (1+0)	+51.0
12	60	Magdalena Gwizdoń	Poland	21:55.7	2 (1+1)	+53.6
13	92	Franziska Hildebrand	Germany	21:57.2	0 (0+0)	+55.1
14	54	Gabriela Soukalová	Czech Republic	21:59.0	1 (0+1)	+56.9
15	89	Ekaterina Shumilova	Russia	22:04.0	0 (0+0)	+1:01.9
16	77	Sophie Boilley	France	22:05.7	1 (1+0)	+1:03.6
17	5	Anastasiya Kuzmina	Slovakia	22:07.0	2 (1+1)	+1:04.9
18	40	Marie Dorin Habert	France	22:10.9	2 (0+2)	+1:08.8
19	18	Synnøve Solemdal	Norway	22:11.0	1 (0+1)	+1:08.9
20	66	Anaïs Bescond	France	22:11.6	2 (0+2)	+1:09.5
21	45	Dorothea Wierer	Italy	22:13.0	1 (0+1)	+1:10.9
22	55	Valj Semerenko	Ukraine	22:13.4	2 (1+1)	+1:11.3
23	26	Elin Mattsson	Sweden	22:13.8	0 (0+0)	+1:11.7
24	105	Monika Hojnisz	Poland	22:18.8	1 (0+1)	+1:16.7
25	31	Nadezhda Skardino	Belarus	22:19.8	0 (0+0)	+1:17.7
26	15	Marie-Laure Brunet	France	22:23.5	1 (0+1)	+1:21.4
27	42	Ekaterina Glazyrina	Russia	22:23.9	2 (0+2)	+1:21.8
28	48	Nastassia Dubarezava	Belarus	22:28.3	1 (0+1)	+1:26.2
29	36	Karin Oberhofer	Italy	22:30.4	2 (1+1)	+1:28.3
30	43	Iris Schwabl	Austria	22:32.1	0 (0+0)	+1:30.0
31	52	Éva Tófalvi	Romania	22:32.2	0 (0+0)	+1:30.1
32	56	Zhang Yan	China	22:33.0	1 (1+0)	+1:30.9
33	21	Andrea Henkel	Germany	22:34.7	3 (1+2)	+1:32.6
34	78	Weronika Nowakowska-Ziemniak	Poland	22:44.3	2 (1+1)	+1:42.2
35	44	Fanny Welle-Strand Horn	Norway	22:44.4	2 (1+1)	+1:42.3
36	65	Elisa Gasparin	Switzerland	22:44.7	0 (0+0)	+1:42.6
37	109	Alexia Runggaldier	Italy	22:45.9	0 (0+0)	+1:43.8
38	32	Tang Jialin	China	22:47.4	1 (1+0)	+1:45.3
39	1	Teja Gregorin	Slovenia	22:52.9	2 (0+2)	+1:50.8
40	27	Diana Rasimovičiūtė	Lithuania	22:53.1	3 (1+2)	+1:51.0
41	2	Fuyuko Suzuki	Japan	22:57.7	1 (0+1)	+1:55.6
42	23	Selina Gasparin	Switzerland	23:01.2	3 (0+3)	+1:59.1
43	8	Darya Domracheva	Belarus	23:01.6	5 (3+2)	+1:59.5
44	63	Elisabeth Högberg	Sweden	23:02.3	1 (1+0)	+2:00.2
=45	49	Victoria Padial Hernández	Spain	23:05.4	0 (0+0)	+2:03.3
=45	57	Annelies Cook	United States	23:05.4	2 (0+2)	+2:03.3
47	99	Jitka Landová	Czech Republic	23:06.4	0 (0+0)	+2:04.3
48	74	Liudmila Kalinchik	Belarus	23:07.7	2 (0+2)	+2:05.6
49	14	Susan Dunklee	United States	23:09.5	4 (2+2)	+2:07.4
50	84	Nicole Gontier	Italy	23:12.9	3 (2+1)	+2:10.8
51	7	Réka Ferencz	Romania	23:14.8	1 (1+0)	+2:12.7
52	25	Romana Schrempf	Austria	23:17.2	3 (1+2)	+2:15.1
53	114	Ma Wei	China	23:17.6	1 (0+1)	+2:15.5
54	79	Megan Heinicke	Canada	23:19.4	2 (1+1)	+2:17.3
55	108	Paulina Fialková	Slovakia	23:23.7	2 (0+2)	+2:21.6
56	53	Darya Usanova	Kazakhstan	23:27.0	3 (1+2)	+2:24.9
57	111	Marina Lebedeva	Kazakhstan	23:27.5	1 (1+0)	+2:25.4
58	22	Amanda Lightfoot	Great Britain	23:27.6	1 (1+0)	+2:25.5
59	106	Ingela Andersson	Sweden	23:27.8	0 (0+0)	+2:25.7
60	20	Mari Laukkanen	Finland	23:28.4	3 (2+1)	+2:26.3
61	29	Barbora Tomešová	Czech Republic	23:30.5	2 (1+1)	+2:28.4
62	17	Niya Dimitrova	Bulgaria	23:30.6	1 (0+1)	+2:28.5
63	96	Iana Bondar	Ukraine	23:31.2	3 (1+2)	+2:29.1
64	51	Andreja Mali	Slovenia	23:33.0	2 (1+1)	+2:30.9
65	82	Sara Studebaker	United States	23:35.5	2 (2+0)	+2:33.4
66	75	Luminita Piscoran	Romania	23:39.0	3 (1+2)	+2:36.9
67	88	Daria Yurlova	Estonia	23:42.3	3 (1+2)	+2:40.2
68	80	Arisa Goshono	Japan	23:48.3	0 (0+0)	+2:46.2
69	59	Laure Soulie	Andorra	23:53.9	2 (1+1)	+2:51.8
70	61	Yuki Nakajima	Japan	24:00.5	3 (1+2)	+2:58.4
71	112	Hanah Dreissigacker	United States	24:01.0	3 (0+3)	+2:58.9
72	85	Martina Chrapánová	Slovakia	24:02.8	3 (1+2)	+3:00.7
73	115	Itsuka Owada	Japan	24:03.3	1 (1+0)	+3:01.2
74	58	Zina Kocher	Canada	24:04.0	4 (1+3)	+3:01.9
75	28	Elena Khrustaleva	Kazakhstan	24:04.4	2 (0+2)	+3:02.3
76	39	Kadri Lehtla	Estonia	24:04.6	3 (1+2)	+3:02.5
77	16	Rosanna Crawford	Canada	24:10.4	3 (2+1)	+3:08.3
78	87	Song Chaoqing	China	24:11.5	3 (2+1)	+3:09.4
79	83	Alina Raikova	Kazakhstan	24:13.0	2 (1+1)	+3:10.9
80	67	Emilia Yordanova	Bulgaria	24:20.8	2 (0+2)	+3:18.7
81	102	Orsolya Tófalvi	Romania	24:22.3	0 (0+0)	+3:20.2
82	69	Emőke Szőcs	Hungary	24:26.7	3 (1+2)	+3:24.6
83	101	Audrey Vaillancourt	Canada	24:27.4	2 (0+2)	+3:25.3
84	70	Nadine Horchler	Germany	24:28.8	4 (1+3)	+3:26.7
85	9	Johanna Talihärm	Estonia	24:30.7	4 (3+1)	+3:28.6
86	97	Patricia Jost	Switzerland	24:31.2	2 (1+1)	+3:29.1
87	37	Jo In-Hee	South Korea	24:34.5	2 (1+1)	+3:32.4
88	100	Desislava Stoyanova	Bulgaria	24:40.9	4 (1+3)	+3:38.8
89	12	Sarah Murphy	New Zealand	24:42.4	2 (0+2)	+3:40.3
90	30	Žanna Juškāne	Latvia	24:48.9	5 (2+3)	+3:46.8
91	64	Baiba Bendika	Latvia	24:51.2	1 (1+0)	+3:49.1
92	90	Dijana Ravnikar	Slovenia	24:55.8	2 (1+1)	+3:53.7
93	62	Sanna Markkanen	Finland	24:56.4	2 (1+1)	+3:54.3
94	110	Aita Gasparin	Switzerland	25:00.4	2 (1+1)	+3:58.3
95	103	Grete Gaim	Estonia	25:14.4	0 (0+0)	+4:12.3
96	76	Nerys Jones	Great Britain	25:16.3	4 (3+1)	+4:14.2
97	81	Katharina Innerhofer	Austria	25:25.4	5 (2+3)	+4:23.3
98	68	Adele Walker	Great Britain	25:26.3	4 (2+2)	+4:24.2
99	41	Natalija Kočergina	Lithuania	25:43.7	7 (2+5)	+4:41.6
100	94	Jenny Jonsson	Sweden	25:46.9	2 (1+1)	+4:44.8
101	107	Lili Drčar	Slovenia	25:57.1	3 (2+1)	+4:55.0
102	47	Kim Seon-Su	South Korea	26:14.1	5 (2+3)	+5:12.0
103	86	Annukka Siltakorpi	Finland	26:18.0	2 (1+1)	+5:15.9
104	104	Dafinka Koeva	Bulgaria	26:37.0	5 (3+2)	+5:34.9
105	91	Marija Kaznacenko	Lithuania	26:37.9	4 (2+2)	+5:35.8
106	98	Park Ji-Ae	South Korea	26:43.4	3 (2+1)	+5:41.3
107	95	Inga Paskovska	Latvia	27:11.7	2 (0+2)	+6:09.6
108	73	Jaqueline Mourão	Brazil	27:18.3	4 (3+1)	+6:16.2
109	71	Panagiota Tsakiri	Greece	27:26.0	2 (1+1)	+6:23.9
110	38	Lucy Glanville	Australia	27:38.2	6 (3+3)	+6:36.1
111	113	Kim Kyung-Nam	South Korea	27:41.6	3 (1+2)	+6:39.5
112	13	Alexandra Camenscic	Moldova	29:16.8	4 (2+2)	+8:14.7
113	6	Nihan Erdiler	Turkey	29:43.9	3 (1+2)	+8:41.8
	46	Tanja Karišik	Bosnia and Herzegovina	DSQ	3 (0+3)	
	3	Chardine Sloof	Netherlands	DNS		
