= Biathlon World Championships 2011 – Women's individual =

Women's individual at the Biathlon World Championships 2011
- Location: Khanty-Mansiysk, Russia
- Date: 9 March
- Competitors: 96 from 32 nations
- Winning time: 47:08.3

Medalists
gold medal	Helena Ekholm	Sweden
silver medal	Tina Bachmann	Germany
bronze medal	Vita Semerenko	Ukraine

The women's individual competition of the Biathlon World Championships 2011 was held on March 9, 2011 at 17:15 local time.

== Results ==
Rank	Bib	Name	Country	Penalties (P+S+P+S)	Time	Deficit
1st place, gold medalist(s)	35	Helena Ekholm	Sweden	0 (0+0+0+0)	47:08.3	0.0
2nd place, silver medalist(s)	57	Tina Bachmann	Germany	2 (0+2+0+0)	49:24.1	+2:15.8
3rd place, bronze medalist(s)	82	Vita Semerenko	Ukraine	3 (1+0+0+2)	50:00.4	+2:52.1
4	11	Nadezhda Skardino	Belarus	1 (0+0+0+1)	50:10.0	+3:01.7
5	12	Magdalena Neuner	Germany	5 (0+2+1+2)	50:24.9	+3:16.6
6	22	Marie Dorin	France	3 (1+1+0+1)	50:57.7	+3:49.4
7	30	Ekaterina Yurlova	Russia	3 (1+1+0+1)	51:29.2	+4:20.9
8	63	Veronika Vítková	Czech Republic	2 (0+0+1+1)	51:43.5	+4:35.2
9	23	Anastasiya Kuzmina	Slovakia	5 (1+0+2+2)	51:44.8	+4:36.5
10	2	Tora Berger	Norway	5 (1+1+2+1)	51:53.0	+4:44.7
11	48	Valj Semerenko	Ukraine	4 (0+1+1+2)	51:54.5	+4:46.2
12	9	Eveli Saue	Estonia	2 (1+0+1+0)	51:56.5	+4:48.2
13	10	Selina Gasparin	Switzerland	2 (0+1+0+1)	51:57.5	+4:49.2
14	89	Natalia Guseva	Russia	4 (1+0+1+2)	52:06.3	+4:58.0
15	81	Karin Oberhofer	Italy	2 (1+1+0+0)	52:11.2	+5:02.9
16	54	Anais Bescond	France	3 (0+2+0+1)	52:31.3	+5:23.0
17	27	Sara Studebaker	United States	2 (0+1+0+1)	52:37.8	+5:29.5
18	33	Natalya Burdyga	Ukraine	4 (1+1+0+2)	52:43.2	+5:34.9
19	8	Darya Domracheva	Belarus	6 (1+2+1+2)	52:56.8	+5:48.5
20	68	Sabrina Buchholz	Germany	3 (0+2+1+0)	52:57.6	+5:49.3
21	43	Anna Bogaliy-Titovets	Russia	5 (1+1+2+1)	52:58.9	+5:50.6
22	36	Agnieszka Cyl	Poland	3 (1+2+0+0)	53:04.1	+5:55.8
23	94	Paulina Bobak	Poland	2 (2+0+0+0)	53:18.5	+6:10.2
24	42	Olena Pidhrushna	Ukraine	5 (1+4+0+0)	53:24.4	+6:16.1
25	90	Roberta Fiandino	Italy	3 (1+1+0+1)	53:30.1	+6:21.8
26	45	Katja Haller	Italy	3 (1+0+1+1)	53:44.2	+6:35.9
27	19	Michela Ponza	Italy	5 (1+0+4+0)	53:49.6	+6:41.3
28	26	Kaisa Mäkäräinen	Finland	7 (1+2+2+2)	53:56.3	+6:48.0
29	84	Fanny Welle-Strand Horn	Norway	4 (2+1+0+1)	54:09.3	+7:01.0
30	6	Éva Tófalvi	Romania	4 (0+1+1+2)	54:11.8	+7:03.5
31	44	Iris Waldhuber	Austria	3 (1+0+0+2)	54:24.1	+7:15.8
32	32	Laure Soulie	Andorra	2 (0+1+1+0)	54:25.3	+7:17.0
33	24	Amanda Lightfoot	Great Britain	3 (0+2+1+0)	54:37.6	+7:29.3
34	77	Barbora Tomešová	Czech Republic	4 (3+0+0+1)	54:40.5	+7:32.2
35	73	Jenny Jonsson	Sweden	3 (1+0+1+1)	54:57.6	+7:49.3
36	86	Yana Romanova	Russia	4 (0+1+3+0)	54:58.8	+7:50.5
37	40	Andreja Mali	Slovenia	5 (2+0+3+0)	55:11.6	+8:03.3
38	58	Anna Maria Nilsson	Sweden	6 (1+1+0+4)	55:30.5	+8:22.2
39	37	Marina Lebedeva	Kazakhstan	4 (1+0+1+2)	55:33.0	+8:24.7
40	14	Mari Laukkanen	Finland	7 (1+2+3+1)	55:45.6	+8:37.3
41	53	Tang Jialin	China	7 (1+2+3+1)	55:47.0	+8:38.7
42	31	Zina Kocher	Canada	7 (2+3+0+2)	56:11.0	+9:02.7
43	47	Laura Spector	United States	6 (1+2+1+2)	56:19.2	+9:10.9
44	20	Anna Carin Zidek	Sweden	8 (3+2+1+2)	56:20.1	+9:11.8
45	28	Andrea Henkel	Germany	9 (3+4+1+1)	56:28.9	+9:20.6
46	4	Gabriela Soukalová	Czech Republic	7 (3+3+0+1)	56:39.2	+9:30.9
47	51	Elisa Gasparin	Switzerland	3 (0+1+1+1)	56:41.4	+9:33.1
48	79	Laura Toivanen	Finland	3 (1+1+0+1)	56:54.7	+9:46.4
49	72	Sophie Boilley	France	6 (0+2+2+2)	57:00.7	+9:52.4
50	56	Emilia Yordanova	Bulgaria	5 (1+2+1+1)	57:03.9	+9:55.6
51	100	Zdeňka Vejnarová	Czech Republic	6 (2+0+1+3)	57:04.5	+9:56.2
52	69	Xu Yinghui	China	5 (0+1+2+2)	57:05.8	+9:57.5
53	66	Sarianna Repo	Finland	4 (1+2+0+1)	57:11.6	+10:03.3
54	67	Kristel Viigipuu	Estonia	5 (0+3+1+1)	57:15.5	+10:07.2
55	55	Liudmila Kalinchik	Belarus	7 (3+2+0+2)	57:16.4	+10:08.1
56	64	Kadri Lehtla	Estonia	7 (1+3+2+1)	57:18.3	+10:10.0
57	70	Olga Nazarova	Belarus	5 (3+2+0+0)	57:25.9	+10:17.6
58	49	Elena Khrustaleva	Kazakhstan	4 (1+1+1+1)	57:54.5	+10:46.2
59	71	Monika Hojnisz	Poland	5 (1+1+2+1)	57:58.7	+10:50.4
60	95	Olga Poltoranina	Kazakhstan	5 (1+2+1+1)	58:01.4	+10:53.1
61	85	Nerys Jones	Great Britain	5 (2+1+1+1)	58:07.9	+10:59.6
62	46	Synnøve Solemdal	Norway	7 (2+3+2+0)	58:14.8	+11:06.5
63	99	Martina Halinárová	Slovakia	6 (0+3+0+3)	58:20.2	+11:11.9
64	74	Natsuko Abe	Japan	7 (2+2+0+3)	58:21.9	+11:13.6
65	15	Itsuka Owada	Japan	7 (2+2+2+1)	58:37.4	+11:29.1
66	101	Annelies Cook	United States	7 (0+3+1+3)	58:59.2	+11:50.9
67	76	Haley Johnson	United States	8 (1+3+1+3)	59:02.5	+11:54.2
68	1	Tadeja Brankovič-Likozar	Slovenia	10 (4+2+0+4)	59:12.1	+12:03.8
69	87	Inna Mozhevitina	Kazakhstan	7 (1+2+1+3)	59:47.0	+12:38.7
70	39	Adele Walker	Great Britain	9 (4+2+1+2)	1:00:02.1	+12:53.8
71	75	Niya Dimitrova	Bulgaria	8 (2+1+3+2)	1:00:04.8	+12:56.5
72	50	Réka Ferencz	Romania	6 (2+1+0+3)	1:00:10.8	+13:02.5
73	65	Magdalena Gwizdoń	Poland	9 (1+2+4+2)	1:00:12.8	+13:04.5
74	83	Luminiţa Piscoran	Romania	8 (0+3+2+3)	1:00:19.0	+13:10.7
75	25	Mun Ji-hee	South Korea	8 (2+3+1+2)	1:00:19.5	+13:11.2
76	29	Nina Klenovska	Bulgaria	10 (1+4+3+2	1:00:30.3	+13:22.0
77	41	Fuyuko Suzuki	Japan	8 (3+1+1+3)	1:00:31.1	+13:22.8
78	92	Jori Mørkve	Norway	8 (2+1+0+5)	1:00:32.0	+13:23.7
79	59	Žanna Juškāne	Latvia	7 (2+1+1+3)	1:00:38.7	+13:30.4
80	38	Wang Chunli	China	9 (2+3+0+4)	1:00:49.8	+13:41.5
81	5	Ann Kristin Flatland	Norway	10 (2+2+2+4)	1:00:56.2	+13:47.9
82	96	Naoko Azegami	Japan	9 (2+2+3+2)	1:01:01.7	+13:53.4
83	93	Wang Yue	China	9 (2+3+1+3)	1:01:04.4	+13:56.1
84	91	Fay Potton	Great Britain	6 (2+2+1+1)	1:01:33.8	+14:25.5
85	60	Chu Kyoung-mi	South Korea	6 (0+5+0+1)	1:01:51.2	+14:42.9
86	3	Aliona Sosunova	Lithuania	7 (2+1+3+1)	1:02:27.0	+15:18.7
87	61	Sarah Murphy	New Zealand	10 (3+4+2+1)	1:03:19.0	+16:10.7
88	16	Tanja Karišik	Bosnia and Herzegovina	9 (2+1+4+2)	1:04:16.1	+17:07.8
89	18	Alexandra Camenşcic	Moldova	6 (0+3+1+2)	1:05:04.9	+17:56.6
90	62	Natalija Kočergina	Lithuania	11 (2+4+3+2)	1:05:47.1	+18:38.8
91	88	Anete Brice	Latvia	10 (1+4+3+2)	1:07:24.2	+20:15.9
92	80	Kim Seo-ra	South Korea	14 (3+4+2+5)	1:10:57.4	+23:49.1
	7	Ekaterina Vinogradova	Armenia	3+1+3+	DNF	
	13	Marie-Laure Brunet	France	7 (0+2+2+3)	DNF	
	78	Martina Chrapánová	Slovakia	0+2+2+	DNF	
	21	Teja Gregorin	Slovenia	6 (0+0+2+4)	DSQ	
	17	Madara Līduma	Latvia		DNS	
	34	Ramona Düringer	Austria		DNS	
	52	Jana Gereková	Slovakia		DNS	
	97	Dafinka Koeva	Bulgaria		DNS	
	98	Sirli Hanni	Estonia		DNS	
