= 2010–11 Biathlon World Cup – Overall Women =

== 2009–10 Top 3 Standings ==
Medal	Athlete	Points
Gold:	(Germany) Magdalena Neuner	933
Silver:	(Germany) Simone Hauswald	854
Bronze:	(Sweden) Helena Jonsson	813

== Events summary ==
Event:	Winner:	Second:	Third:
Östersund 15 km Individual details	Anna Carin Zidek; Sweden	Marie Laure Brunet; France	Helena Ekholm; Sweden
Östersund 7.5 km Sprint details	Kaisa Mäkäräinen; Finland	Miriam Gössner; Germany	Darya Domracheva; Belarus
Östersund 10 km Pursuit details	Kaisa Mäkäräinen; Finland	Miriam Gössner; Germany	Helena Ekholm; Sweden
Hochfilzen 7.5 km Sprint details	Anastasiya Kuzmina; Slovakia	Darya Domracheva; Belarus	Kaisa Mäkäräinen; Finland
Hochfilzen 10 km Pursuit details	Helena Ekholm; Sweden	Kaisa Mäkäräinen; Finland	Darya Domracheva; Belarus
Pokljuka 15 km Individual details	Tora Berger; Norway	Kaisa Mäkäräinen; Finland	Marie Laure Brunet; France
Pokljuka 7.5 km Sprint details	Magdalena Neuner; Germany	Anastasiya Kuzmina; Slovakia	Kaisa Mäkäräinen; Finland; Olga Zaitseva; Russia
Oberhof 7.5 km Sprint details	Ann Kristin Flatland; Norway	Magdalena Neuner; Germany	Andrea Henkel; Germany
Oberhof 12.5 km Mass start details	Helena Ekholm; Sweden	Andrea Henkel; Germany	Svetlana Sleptsova; Russia
Ruhpolding 15 km Individual details	Olga Zaitseva; Russia	Andrea Henkel; Germany	Helena Ekholm; Sweden
Ruhpolding 7.5 km Sprint details	Tora Berger; Norway	Andrea Henkel; Germany	Magdalena Neuner; Germany
Ruhpolding 10 km Pursuit details	Tora Berger; Norway	Andrea Henkel; Germany	Kaisa Mäkäräinen; Finland
Antholz-Anterselva 7.5 km Sprint details	Tora Berger; Norway	Anastasiya Kuzmina; Slovakia	Olga Zaitseva; Russia
Antholz-Anterselva 12.5 km Mass start details	Tora Berger; Norway	Marie-Laure Brunet; France	Darya Domracheva; Belarus
Presque Isle 7.5 km Sprint details	Helena Ekholm; Sweden	Tora Berger; Norway	Valj Semerenko; Ukraine
Presque Isle 10 km Pursuit details	Tora Berger; Norway	Marie Dorin; France	Darya Domracheva; Belarus
Fort Kent 7.5 km Sprint details	Andrea Henkel; Germany	Miriam Gössner; Germany	Magdalena Neuner; Germany
Fort Kent 10 km Pursuit details	Andrea Henkel; Germany	Magdalena Neuner; Germany	Marie Dorin; France
Fort Kent 12.5 km Mass start details	Magdalena Neuner; Germany	Andrea Henkel; Germany	Darya Domracheva; Belarus
World Championships 7.5 km Sprint details	Magdalena Neuner; Germany	Kaisa Mäkäräinen; Finland	Anastasiya Kuzmina; Slovakia
World Championships 10 km Pursuit details	Kaisa Mäkäräinen; Finland	Magdalena Neuner; Germany	Helena Ekholm; Sweden
World Championships 15 km Individual details	Helena Ekholm; Sweden	Tina Bachmann; Germany	Vita Semerenko; Ukraine
World Championships 12.5 km Mass start details	Magdalena Neuner; Germany	Darya Domracheva; Belarus	Tora Berger; Norway
Oslo 7.5 km Sprint details	Magdalena Neuner; Germany	Tora Berger; Norway	Darya Domracheva; Belarus
Oslo 10 km Pursuit details	Anastasiya Kuzmina; Slovakia	Darya Domracheva; Belarus	Andrea Henkel; Germany
Oslo 12.5 km Mass start details	Darya Domracheva; Belarus	Anna Bogaliy-Titovets; Russia	Olga Zaitseva; Russia

== Standings ==
#	Name	ÖST IN	ÖST SP	ÖST PU	HOC SP	HOC PU	POK IN	POK SP	OBE SP	OBE MS	RUH IN	RUH SP	RUH PU	ANT SP	ANT MS	PRI SP	PRI PU	FRK SP	FRK PU	FRK MS	WCH SP	WCH PU	WCH IN	WCH MS	OSL SP	OSL PU	OSL MS	Total
1.	Kaisa Mäkäräinen (FIN)	30	60	60	48	54	54	48	40	31	34	34	48	19	dsq	32	38	34	40	40	54	60	13	43	22	43	26	1005
2	Andrea Henkel (GER)	32	38	28	21	30	29	12	48	54	54	54	54	43	26	16	40	60	60	54	21	43	0	28	36	48	43	972
3	Helena Ekholm (SWE)	48	40	48	40	60	17	36	32	60	48	32	38	22	25	60	31	19	29	38	40	48	60	36	3	25	36	971
4	Tora Berger (NOR)	10	—	—	32	31	60	0	17	30	32	60	60	60	60	54	60	43	43	43	36	40	31	48	54	34	25	963
5	Magdalena Neuner (GER)	—	—	—	36	36	34	60	54	32	25	48	34	—	38	38	43	48	54	60	60	54	40	60	60	—	38	952
6	Darya Domracheva (BLR)	6	48	34	54	48	23	20	43	26	0	27	28	0	48	30	48	38	34	48	15	6	22	54	48	54	60	862
7	Marie Dorin (FRA)	29	15	23	6	15	3	38	21	28	40	17	23	30	24	40	54	36	48	32	34	26	38	34	28	22	22	726
8	Teja Gregorin (SLO)	36	36	32	30	32	32	25	16	27	27	29	25	38	40	29	1	40	36	25	27	23	11	40	27	18	20	722
9	Anastasiya Kuzmina (SVK)	0	2	27	60	34	28	54	29	36	0	38	36	54	43	—	—	—	—	—	48	38	32	31	43	60	15	708
10	Anna Carin Zidek (SWE)	60	32	43	29	40	36	17	34	29	16	36	43	14	30	24	17	27	30	29	30	28	0	23	12	7	17	703
11	Valj Semerenko (UKR)	43	31	40	27	24	43	27	28	19	43	18	30	28	22	48	28	2	22	31	31	17	30	25	0	0	30	687
12	Olga Zaitseva (RUS)	38	34	38	0	22	40	48	4	24	60	43	40	48	21	—	—	—	—	—	43	29	—	38	22	2	48	642
13	Marie Laure Brunet (FRA)	54	22	18	38	43	48	28	30	43	30	40	26	23	54	15	16	29	—	28	0	—	0	32	—	—	—	617
14	Miriam Gössner (GER)	2	54	54	23	16	0	29	0	22	2	24	19	24	13	20	12	54	31	27	32	36	—	27	6	38	28	593
15	Vita Semerenko (UKR)	14	10	19	26	26	30	26	36	38	36	21	29	25	17	—	—	—	—	—	23	24	48	16	40	31	31	566
16	Ann Kristin Flatland (NOR)	31	3	25	43	29	26	13	60	40	0	31	27	20	36	13	18	26	20	11	7	—	0	—	29	28	13	549
17	Ekaterina Yurlova (RUS)	12	5	29	28	28	21	21	38	34	10	30	32	31	19	—	—	—	—	—	38	31	36	26	17	40	18	544
18	Svetlana Sleptsova (RUS)	34	27	36	0	21	31	18	11	48	38	23	31	0	32	31	26	0	—	17	—	—	—	—	20	32	40	516
19	Tina Bachmann (GER)	23	43	31	0	11	11	31	7	21	21	10	10	29	18	4	29	19	18	21	—	—	54	29	8	30	27	505
20	Kathrin Hitzer (GER)	0	28	24	25	23	12	34	27	12	—	11	21	15	20	28	8	21	38	36	14	15	—	—	34	27	32	505
21	Anna Bogaliy-Titovets (RUS)	0	30	26	34	38	0	32	—	25	0	8	20	34	31	—	—	—	—	—	20	30	20	18	16	11	54	447
22	Agnieszka Cyl (POL)	24	26	12	2	7	27	23	24	14	13	—	—	0	23	38	30	9	27	30	28	14	19	22	—	—	—	412
23	Michela Ponza (ITA)	15	0	—	4	14	7	10	0	—	19	13	14	17	—	43	32	5	11	22	18	27	14	30	24	23	23	385
24	Nadezhda Skardino (BLR)	0	20	7	22	13	16	11	0	—	15	4	0	10	—	0	21	31	28	14	25	25	43	24	0	12	21	362
25	Anais Bescond (FRA)	0	23	15	13	8	0	40	13	—	22	15	8	3	—	—	—	28	25	16	2	20	25	19	26	10	12	343
26	Olena Pidhrushna (UKR)	26	7	30	0	1	15	30	0	—	14	22	11	21	29	—	—	—	—	—	10	22	17	17	30	24	16	342
27	Iana Romanova (RUS)	40	24	0	18	27	13	—	14	23	31	28	22	12	27	0	6	13	13	23	—	—	4	—	—	—	—	338
28	Eveli Saue (EST)	1	9	22	31	2	14	16	20	11	17	0	—	32	28	0	4	25	26	24	0	0	29	—	2	9	11	333
29	Selina Gasparin (SUI)	18	0	0	17	0	6	4	0	—	29	0	6	40	34	26	0	1	6	15	0	—	28	—	26	36	24	316
30	Sabrina Buchholz (GER)	8	25	0	14	18	—	14	25	17	28	0	9	0	—	17	14	4	12	34	—	—	21	—	0	5	—	265
#	Name	ÖST IN	ÖST SP	ÖST PU	HOC SP	HOC PU	POK IN	POK SP	OBE SP	OBE MS	RUH IN	RUH SP	RUH PU	ANT SP	ANT MS	LKP SP	LKP PU	FRK SP	FRK PU	FRK MS	WCH SP	WCH PU	WCH IN	WCH MS	OSL SP	OSL PU	OSL MS	Total
31	Natalia Guseva (RUS)	—	—	—	—	—	0	22	15	—	4	0	0	36	15	22	23	0	8	—	—	—	27	—	38	15	34	259
32	Andreja Mali (SLO)	0	29	16	20	19	5	0	0	—	18	19	15	0	—	14	34	6	7	19	11	8	3	—	0	0	—	243
33	Anna Maria Nilsson (SWE)	0	16	6	12	10	22	—	2	—	0	14	3	27	14	6	2	17	10	—	29	16	2	15	15	0	—	238
34	Sara Studebaker (USA)	0	0	—	15	0	20	0	1	—	0	9	0	0	—	27	13	24	14	18	0	3	24	—	18	21	19	226
35	Éva Tófalvi (ROU)	3	0	0	10	9	24	0	12	—	20	26	24	0	—	0	—	10	15	—	26	13	10	21	—	—	—	223
36	Katja Haller (ITA)	28	19	20	0	—	9	0	18	—	26	0	—	1	—	12	11	0	0	—	1	18	15	—	0	—	—	178
37	Inna Suprun (UKR)	9	0	3	9	0	0	0	—	—	0	0	—	0	—	0	0	32	24	13	19	21	—	14	0	26	—	170
38	Liudmila Kalinchik (BLR)	0	12	2	0	0	0	0	23	15	11	2	2	5	—	0	15	30	23	20	0	0	0	—	0	—	—	160
39	Marina Lebedeva (KAZ)	0	0	—	19	25	38	7	31	20	9	0	—	0	—	—	—	—	—	—	5	0	1	—	—	—	—	155
40	Sophie Boilley (FRA)	11	0	0	7	0	0	0	—	—	—	—	—	—	—	34	36	20	16	—	7	2	0	—	13	0	—	146
41	Jana Gereková (SVK)	0	17	5	16	20	0	5	0	—	0	0	0	6	—	—	—	—	—	—	24	34	—	13	0	4	—	144
42	Oksana Khvostenko (UKR)	21	18	21	—	—	25	0	26	18	12	—	—	0	—	—	—	—	—	—	—	—	—	—	—	—	—	141
43	Veronika Vítková (CZE)	7	0	0	0	—	—	—	9	—	0	0	1	0	—	18	20	0	9	—	0	7	34	11	23	0	—	139
44	Ekaterina Glazyrina (RUS)	—	—	—	—	—	—	—	—	—	—	—	—	—	—	2	27	22	32	26	—	—	—	—	4	19	—	132
45	Natalya Burdyga (UKR)	—	—	—	—	—	—	—	—	—	7	0	16	13	—	19	24	7	21	—	—	—	23	—	0	—	—	130
46	Synnøve Solemdal (NOR)	22	21	4	0	0	—	0	0	—	0	7	13	0	—	21	22	—	—	—	0	0	0	—	0	17	—	127
47	Fanny Welle-Strand Horn (NOR)	0	0	0	11	4	1	0	0	—	1	0	0	0	—	3	5	11	0	—	17	10	12	12	32	3	—	122
48	Uliana Denisova (RUS)	—	—	—	—	—	—	—	—	—	—	—	—	—	—	25	25	23	19	12	—	—	—	—	—	—	—	104
49	Pauline Macabies (FRA)	13	0	0	24	12	0	—	0	—	3	20	18	0	—	8	0	3	0	—	—	—	—	—	0	—	—	101
50	Jenny Jonsson (SWE)	0	—	—	—	—	0	6	5	—	8	0	5	26	16	23	0	—	—	—	—	—	5	—	0	0	—	94
51	Madara Līduma (LAT)	0	14	9	0	0	0	15	0	—	0	25	17	2	—	—	—	—	—	—	0	—	—	—	0	8	—	90
52	Evgeniya Sedova (RUS)	—	—	—	—	—	—	—	—	—	—	—	—	—	—	—	—	—	—	—	—	—	—	—	31	29	29	89
53	Laura Spector (USA)	16	0	—	0	0	0	0	22	16	0	5	0	18	12	0	0	0	0	—	0	—	0	—	0	—	—	89
54	Dorothea Wierer (ITA)	—	—	—	0	—	—	—	0	—	—	17	4	—	—	—	—	—	—	—	13	32	—	20	0	0	—	86
55	Tadeja Brankovič-Likozar (SLO)	0	0	0	0	5	0	0	—	—	0	12	12	11	—	—	—	—	—	—	22	12	0	—	0	—	—	74
56	Karin Oberhofer (ITA)	17	0	0	0	—	0	0	—	—	0	0	7	0	—	—	—	—	—	—	0	—	26	—	0	13	—	63
57	Mari Laukkanen (FIN)	0	0	—	0	—	—	—	10	—	—	—	—	0	—	11	7	0	5	—	12	0	0	—	0	16	—	61
58	Haley Johnson (USA)	—	—	—	—	—	—	—	—	—	0	0	0	4	—	0	3	0	0	—	0	—	0	—	19	20	14	60
59	Anna Karin Strömstedt (SWE)	—	0	—	0	—	0	0	—	—	0	0	0	0	—	10	0	14	17	—	0	5	—	—	10	0	—	56
60	Juliane Döll (GER)	0	0	14	—	—	0	—	—	—	24	—	—	0	—	—	—	—	—	—	—	—	—	—	14	0	—	52
#	Name	ÖST IN	ÖST SP	ÖST PU	HOC SP	HOC PU	POK IN	POK SP	OBE SP	OBE MS	RUH IN	RUH SP	RUH PU	ANT SP	ANT MS	PQI SP	PQI PU	FRK SP	FRK PU	FRK MS	WCH SP	WCH PU	WCH IN	WCH MS	OSL SP	OSL PU	OSL MS	Total
61	Weronika Nowakowska-Ziemniak (POL)	0	8	13	0	—	0	0	—	—	0	—	—	9	—	—	—	16	4	—	—	—	—	—	—	—	—	50
62	Paulina Bobak (POL)	27	0	0	0	—	0	0	0	—	0	0	0	0	—	—	—	—	—	—	0	—	18	—	—	—	—	45
63	Magdalena Gwizdon (POL)	25	0	0	0	—	0	0	0	—	0	0	—	0	—	—	—	—	—	—	9	9	0	—	—	—	—	43
64	Barbora Tomesova (CZE)	0	0	—	0	—	8	19	0	—	5	3	0	0	—	—	—	—	—	—	0	—	6	—	0	0	—	41
65	Nina Klenovska (BUL)	0	—	—	0	0	2	0	0	—	0	0	0	16	—	9	0	8	3	—	0	—	0	—	—	—	—	38
66	Olga Vilukhina (RUS)	20	—	—	0	17	—	0	—	—	—	—	—	—	—	—	—	—	—	—	—	—	—	—	—	—	—	37
67	Kadri Lehtla (EST)	0	4	11	0	—	4	0	0	—	0	0	0	0	—	—	—	—	—	—	0	—	0	—	11	6	—	36
68	Gabriela Soukalová (CZE)	—	—	—	—	—	—	—	—	—	—	—	—	—	—	—	—	—	—	—	16	19	0	—	0	0	—	35
69	Elena Khrustaleva (KAZ)	0	0	—	0	0	0	3	19	13	—	—	—	—	—	—	—	—	—	—	0	—	0	—	—	—	—	35
70	Elisabeth Högberg (SWE)	0	0	0	0	—	0	0	0	—	—	—	—	0	—	1	9	15	2	—	—	—	—	—	7	1	—	35
71	Ekaterina Iourieva (RUS)	—	—	—	—	—	—	—	—	—	—	—	—	—	—	0	19	12	1	—	—	—	—	—	—	—	—	32
72	Laure Soulie (AND)	—	—	—	—	—	—	—	—	—	0	6	0	0	—	7	10	0	—	—	0	0	8	—	0	—	—	31
73	Olga Poltoranina (KAZ)	4	6	17	0	3	0	0	—	—	—	—	—	0	—	—	—	—	—	—	0	0	0	—	—	—	—	30
74	Monika Hojnisz (POL)	0	0	—	8	0	19	—	0	—	—	—	—	—	—	—	—	—	—	—	0	—	0	—	—	—	—	27
75	Wang Chunli (CHN)	0	11	8	3	—	—	—	—	—	—	0	—	—	—	—	—	—	—	—	3	1	0	—	0	—	—	26
76	Tang Jialin (CHN)	0	0	0	1	6	0	2	3	—	0	0	—	8	—	—	—	—	—	—	0	—	0	—	5	0	—	25
77	Zina Kocher (CAN)	0	0	—	0	—	0	24	0	—	0	0	0	—	—	—	—	0	0	—	0	—	0	—	—	—	—	24
78	Claire Breton (FRA)	0	0	—	0	—	—	—	0	—	23	0	—	0	—	—	—	—	—	—	—	—	—	—	—	—	—	23
79	Kari Henneseid Eie (NOR)	5	0	0	0	0	18	0	0	—	—	—	—	—	—	0	—	0	0	—	—	—	—	—	—	—	—	23
80	Nadine Horchler (GER)	—	—	—	—	—	—	—	—	—	—	—	—	—	—	—	—	—	—	—	—	—	—	—	9	14	—	23
81	Zdenka Vejnarova (CZE)	19	0	—	0	0	0	0	0	—	0	0	—	0	—	—	—	—	—	—	0	—	0	—	—	—	—	19
82	Ramona Dueringer (AUT)	—	—	—	—	—	—	—	—	—	—	—	—	—	—	—	—	—	—	—	8	11	—	—	—	—	—	19
83	Diana Rasimovičiūtė (LTU)	0	1	10	—	—	—	8	0	—	—	0	—	0	—	—	—	—	—	—	0	—	—	—	0	—	—	19
84	Roberta Fiandino (ITA)	—	—	—	—	—	—	—	—	—	—	—	—	0	—	—	—	—	—	—	—	—	16	—	—	—	—	16
85	Irina Mozhevitina (KAZ)	0	0	—	5	0	10	0	0	—	0	0	0	0	—	—	—	—	—	—	0	0	0	—	—	—	—	15
86	Megan Imrie (CAN)	0	0	—	0	—	0	9	0	—	6	—	—	—	—	—	—	—	—	—	—	—	—	—	—	—	—	15
87	Xu Yinghui (CHN)	0	—	—	0	0	0	0	8	—	0	0	—	7	—	—	—	—	—	—	0	—	0	—	—	—	—	15
88	Anna Boulygina (RUS)	—	13	0	—	—	—	—	—	—	—	—	—	—	—	—	—	—	—	—	—	—	—	—	—	—	—	13
89	Iris Waldhuber (AUT)	0	—	—	—	—	—	—	—	—	—	—	—	0	—	—	—	—	—	—	0	—	9	—	0	—	—	9
90	Amanda Lightfoot (GBR)	0	0	—	0	—	0	0	—	—	0	—	—	0	—	—	—	—	—	—	0	0	7	—	0	—	—	7
#	Name	ÖST IN	ÖST SP	ÖST PU	HOC SP	HOC PU	POK IN	POK SP	OBE SP	OBE MS	RUH IN	RUH SP	RUH PU	ANT SP	ANT MS	PQI SP	PQI PU	FRK SP	FRK PU	FRK MS	WCH SP	WCH PU	WCH IN	WCH MS	OSL SP	OSL PU	OSL MS	Total
91	Nadzeya Pisareva (BLR)	0	0	0	—	—	0	—	6	—	0	0	—	—	—	—	—	—	—	—	0	—	—	—	0	—	—	6
92	Olga Nazarova (BLR)	0	—	—	—	—	0	1	—	—	—	—	—	—	—	5	0	0	0	—	—	—	0	—	—	—	—	6
93	Ekaterina Vinogradova (ARM)	—	—	—	—	—	—	—	—	—	—	—	—	—	—	0	0	0	0	—	0	4	0	—	0	0	—	4
94	Itsuka Owada (JPN)	0	—	—	—	—	0	0	0	—	0	—	—	0	—	—	—	—	—	—	4	0	0	—	—	—	—	4
95	Fuyuko Suzuki (JPN)	0	0	1	0	0	0	0	0	—	—	0	—	—	—	—	—	—	—	—	0	0	0	—	0	—	—	1
96	Nastassia Dubarezava (BLR)	—	—	—	0	0	—	—	0	—	—	—	—	0	—	—	—	—	—	—	—	—	—	—	1	0	—	1
97	Marine Bolliet (FRA)	—	—	—	—	—	—	—	—	—	0	1	0	0	—	—	—	—	—	—	—	—	—	—	0	0	—	1
#	Name	ÖST IN	ÖST SP	ÖST PU	HOC SP	HOC PU	POK IN	POK SP	OBE SP	OBE MS	RUH IN	RUH SP	RUH PU	ANT SP	ANT MS	PQI SP	PQI PU	FRK SP	FRK PU	FRK MS	WCH SP	WCH PU	WCH IN	WCH MS	OSL SP	OSL PU	OSL MS	Total
