= Biathlon European Championships 2010 =

International biathlon competition

Biathlon European Championships 2010 official logo

The 17th Biathlon European Championships were held in Otepää, Estonia from March 2 to March 7, 2010.

There were total of 15 competitions held: sprint, pursuit and individual both for U26 and U21, relay races for U26 and a mixed relay for U21.

== Schedule of events ==
The schedule of the event stands below. All times in CET.

Date	Event
March 2	U26 Men's 20 km individual
March 2	U26 Women's 15 km individual
March 2	U21 Men's 20 km individual
March 2	U21 Women's 15 km individual
March 4	U26 Men's 4*7.5 km relay
March 4	U21 Women's 4*6 km relay
March 4	U21 2*6+2*7.5 km mixed relay
March 6	U26 Men's 10 km sprint
March 6	U26 Women's 7.5 km sprint
March 6	U21 Men's 10 km sprint
March 6	U21 Women's 7.5 km sprint
March 7	U26 Men's 12.5 km pursuit
March 7	U26 Women's 10 km pursuit
March 7	U21 Men's 12.5 km pursuit
March 7	U21 Women's 10 km pursuit

== Results ==
=== U26 ===
==== Men's ====
Competition	1st	2nd	3rd
Men's 10 km sprint	(Germany) Daniel Böhm	(Russia) Alexey Volkov	(Norway) Ronny Hafsås
Men's 12.5 km pursuit	(Russia) Alexey Volkov	(Germany) Erik Lesser	(Germany) Christoph Knie
Men's 20 km individual	(Germany) Christoph Knie	(Ukraine) Oleg Berezhnoy	(Russia) Alexey Volkov
Men's 4*7.5 km relay	(Germany) Germany; Simon Schempp; Erik Lesser; Daniel Böhm; Christoph Knie	(Russia) Russia; Alexey Volkov; Dmitry Malyshko; Vladimir Semakov; Victor Vasilyev	(France) France; Tanguy Roche; Jean-Guillaume Béatrix; Arnaud Langel; Vincent Porret

==== Women's ====
Competition	1st	2nd	3rd
Women's 7.5 km sprint	(Ukraine) Valentina Semerenko	(Lithuania) Diana Rasimovičiūtė	(Ukraine) Vita Semerenko
Women's 10 km pursuit	(Ukraine) Vita Semerenko	(Germany) Kathrin Hitzer	(Russia) Ekaterina Shumilova
Women's 15 km individual	(Germany) Kathrin Hitzer	(Lithuania) Diana Rasimovičiūtė	(Germany) Franziska Hildebrand
Women's 4*6 km relay	(Germany) Germany; Stefanie Hildebrand; Juliane Döll; Franziska Hildebrand; Kathrin Hitzer	(Ukraine) Ukraine; Olena Pidhrushna; Valentina Semerenko; Svetlana Krykonchuk; Vita Semerenko	(Russia) Russia; Olga Vilukhina; Ekaterina Yurlova; Ekaterina Glazyrina; Ekaterina Shumilova

===== 4 x 6 km Relay =====
The women's relay competition was held on March 4, 2010.

Place	Country	Team	Time	Penalties
1	Germany	Stefanie Hildebrand; Juliane Döll; Franziska Hildebrand; Kathrin Hitzer	1:15:15.4	0+0 - 0+0; 0+1 - 0+0; 0+1 - 0+0; 0+0 - 0+0
2	Ukraine	Olena Pidhrushna; Valj Semerenko; Svetlana Krykonchuk; Vita Semerenko	+20.4	0+0 - 0+1; 0+0 - 0+3; 0+1 - 0+2; 0+1 - 0+0
3	Russia	Olga Vilukhina; Ekaterina Yurlova; Ekaterina Glazyrina; Ekaterina Shumilova	+26.4	0+0 - 0+1; 0+0 - 0+0; 0+3 - 0+2; 0+0 - 0+3
4	Norway	Kaia Woeinen Nicolaisen; Tiril Eckhoff; Fanny Welle-Strand Horn; Synnøve Solemdal	+4:04.6	0+2 - 0+2; 0+0 - 0+3; 0+0 - 0+3; 0+1 - 1+3
5	Estonia	Kadri Lehtla; Sirli Hanni; Elisabeth Juudas; Eveli Saue	+5:38.3	0+1 - 0+0; 0+1 - 0+0; 0+3 - 2+3; 0+2 - 0+3
6	Sweden	Jenny Jonsson; Ingela Andersson; Emelie Larsson; Elin Mattsson	+5:53.9	0+0 - 0+1; 0+3 - 1+3; 0+0 - 0+0; 0+1 - 0+0
7	Poland	Paulina Bobak; Monika Hojnisz; Patrycja Hojnisz; Karolina Pitoń	+6:20.7	0+0 - 0+1; 0+0 - 0+3; 0+2 - 1+3; 0+0 - 0+3
8	Belarus	Iryna Babezkaja; Karina Savosik; Darya Neserchik; Darja Jurkewitsch	+6:57.4	1+3 - 0+3; 0+0 - 0+0; 0+2 - 0+2; 0+0 - 0+1
9	United States	Annelies Cook; Laura Spector; Hanah Dreissigacker; Susan Dunklee	+7:54.1	0+2 - 0+0; 0+1 - 0+3; 0+0 - 1+3; 0+3 - 0+1
10	Czech Republic	Barbora Tomešová; Miroslava Špácová; Lenka Slechtová; Jitka Landová	+7:47.2	0+3 - 0+3; 0+2 - 0+2; 0+3 - 0+3; 0+1 - 1+3
11	Finland	Mari Laukkanen; Sarianna Repo; Laura Toivanen; Maiju Pöysti	+10:07.6	0+1 - 3+3; 0+1 - 0+1; 0+2 - 0+3; 0+0 - 2+3

=== U21 ===
==== Men's ====
Competition	1st	2nd	3rd
Men's 10 km sprint	(Russia) Maksim Burtasov	(Russia) Evgeny Petrov	(Belarus) Vladimir Alenishko
Men's 12.5 km pursuit	(Ukraine) Andriy Vozniak	(Russia) Maksim Burtasov	(Belarus) Vladimir Alenishko
Men's 20 km individual	(Russia) Andrey Turgenev	(Ukraine) Andriy Vozniak	(France) Rémi Borgeot

==== Women's ====
Competition	1st	2nd	3rd
Women's 7.5 km sprint	(Norway) Tiril Eckhoff	(Russia) Anastasia Kalina	(Norway) Synnøve Solemdal
Women's 10 km pursuit	(Norway) Synnøve Solemdal	(Russia) Anastasia Kalina	(Norway) Tiril Eckhoff
Women's 15 km individual	(Poland) Monika Hojnisz	(Norway) Kaia Wøien Nicolaisen	(Norway) Tiril Eckhoff

==== Mixed ====
Competition	1st	2nd	3rd
Mixed 2*6+2*7.5 km relay	(France) France; Leslie Mercier; Sophie Boilley; Yann Guigonnet; Rémi Borgeot	(Russia) Russia; Larisa Kuznetsova; Anastasia Kalina; Evgeny Petrov; Maksim Burtasov	(Romania) Romania; Réka Ferencz; Diana Mihalache; Ștefan Gavrilă; Roland Gerbacea

== Medal table ==
No.	Country	Gold	Silver	Bronze	Total
1	Germany	5	2	2	9
2	Russia	3	7	3	13
3	Ukraine	3	3	1	7
4	Norway	2	1	4	7
5	France	1	0	2	3
6	Poland	1	0	0	1
7	Lithuania	0	2	0	2
8	Belarus	0	0	2	2
9	Romania	0	0	1	1
