= Drčar =

Drčar is a Slovene surname. Notable people with the surname include:

- Lili Drčar (born 1990), Slovene biathlete
- Mojca Drčar Murko (born 1942), Slovene politician
