= Semerenko =

Semerenko (Ukrainian: Семеренко) is a Ukrainian surname. Notable people with the surname include:

- Valentyna Semerenko (born 1986), Ukrainian biathlete
- Vita Semerenko (born 1986), Ukrainian biathlete
