= Biathlon World Championships 2007 – Women's mass start =

Below are the results of the 2007 Biathlon World Championships 2007 for the women's mass start, which took place on 10 February 2007.

== Results ==
Rank	Athlete	Nation	P1	P2	S1	S2	T	Result
1	Andrea Henkel	(Germany) GER	1	0	1	0	2	37:13.1
2	Martina Glagow	(Germany) GER	1	0	0	0	1	+4.6
3	Kati Wilhelm	(Germany) GER	0	1	1	0	2	+10.6
4	Natalia Guseva	(Russia) RUS	0	1	0	0	1	+20.8
5	Ekaterina Iourieva	(Russia) RUS	0	0	0	0	0	+28.2
6	Linda Grubben	(Norway) NOR	0	0	2	0	2	+28.7
7	Kaisa Mäkäräinen	(Finland) FIN	0	1	0	0	1	+44.5
8	Helena Jonsson	(Sweden) SWE	0	0	0	1	1	+1:00.7
9	Tadeja Brankovic	(Slovenia) SLO	1	1	0	0	2	+1:02.5
10	Florence Baverel-Robert	(France) FRA	0	0	1	1	2	+1:04.9
11	Tatiana Moiseeva	(Russia) RUS	1	0	0	2	3	+1:17.4
12	Oksana Khvostenko	(Ukraine) UKR	0	1	0	0	1	+1:28.3
13	Olena Petrova	(Ukraine) UKR	0	0	1	1	2	+1:32.3
14	Magdalena Neuner	(Germany) GER	1	1	2	3	7	+1:39.4
15	Teja Gregorin	(Slovenia) SLO	1	1	0	1	3	+1:53.3
16	Magdalena Gwizdon	(Poland) POL	1	1	2	0	4	+1:57.5
17	Krystyna Pałka	(Poland) POL	1	1	0	0	2	+1:57.8
18	Ann Kristin Flatland	(Norway) NOR	0	1	0	1	2	+2:12.7
19	Qiao Yin	(China) CHN	0	0	2	1	3	+2:16.5
20	Vita Semerenko	(Ukraine) UKR	1	0	0	2	3	+2:44.2
21	Michela Ponza	(Italy) ITA	1	2	0	1	4	+3:12.6
22	Eveli Saue	(Estonia) EST	0	0	3	3	6	+3:28.6
23	Sandrine Bailly	(France) FRA	0	3	3	1	7	+3:51.3
24	Martina Halinarova	(Slovakia) SVK	2	2	0	0	4	+4:04.1
25	Tora Berger	(Norway) NOR	2	1	2	2	7	+4:10.6
26	Katja Haller	(Italy) ITA	2	3	0	0	5	+4:15.3
27	Madara Liduma	(Latvia) LAT	0	1	2	3	6	+4:34.5
28	Andreja Mali	(Slovenia) SLO	1	2	2	1	6	+5:45.1
-	Olga Kudrashova	(Belarus) BLR	2	2	-	-	-	DNF
-	Darya Domracheva	(Belarus) BLR	0	1	2	-	-	DNF
