= Biathlon World Championships 2013 – Women's mass start =

Women's mass start at the Biathlon World Championships 2013
- Date: 17 February 2013
- Competitors: 30 from 13 nations
- Winning time: 35:54.5

Medalists
| gold medal | Darya Domracheva | Belarus |
| silver medal | Tora Berger | Norway |
| bronze medal | Monika Hojnisz | Poland |

The women's mass start event of the Biathlon World Championships 2013 was held on February 17, 2013. 30 athletes participated over a course of 12.5 km.

== Results ==
The race started at 12:00.

| Rank | Bib | Name | Nationality | Time | Penalties (P+P+S+S) | Deficit |
|---|---|---|---|---|---|---|
| 1st place, gold medalist(s) | 8 | Darya Domracheva | Belarus | 35:54.5 | 2 (1+0+0+1) | |
| 2nd place, silver medalist(s) | 2 | Tora Berger | Norway | 36:03.2 | 2 (1+0+1+0) | +8.7 |
| 3rd place, bronze medalist(s) | 25 | Monika Hojnisz | Poland | 36:22.1 | 1 (0+0+1+0) | +27.6 |
| 4 | 5 | Vita Semerenko | Ukraine | 36:41.1 | 2 (0+1+0+1) | +46.6 |
| 5 | 10 | Olga Zaitseva | Russia | 36:46.6 | 2 (1+1+0+0) | +51.2 |
| 6 | 9 | Miriam Gössner | Germany | 36:46.6 | 4 (0+1+0+3) | +51.2 |
| 7 | 3 | Krystyna Pałka | Poland | 36:55.3 | 1 (0+0+0+1) | +1:00.8 |
| 8 | 16 | Teja Gregorin | Slovenia | 36:59.0 | 2 (0+1+0+1) | +1:04.5 |
| 9 | 12 | Marie Dorin Habert | France | 37:05.3 | 2 (0+0+2+0) | +1:10.8 |
| 10 | 22 | Jana Gereková | Slovakia | 37:12.2 | 3 (0+1+1+1) | +1:17.7 |
| 11 | 1 | Olena Pidhrushna | Ukraine | 37:33.4 | 2 (0+0+1+1) | +1:38.9 |
| 12 | 28 | Weronika Nowakowska-Ziemniak | Poland | 37:36.3 | 2 (1+0+0+1) | +1:41.8 |
| 13 | 4 | Andrea Henkel | Germany | 37:38.9 | 4 (1+0+2+1) | +1:44.4 |
| 14 | 27 | Anaïs Bescond | France | 37:45.0 | 3 (1+0+1+1) | +1:50.5 |
| 15 | 14 | Anastasiya Kuzmina | Slovakia | 37:54.5 | 4 (1+2+1+0) | +2:00.0 |
| 16 | 26 | Synnøve Solemdal | Norway | 38:00.2 | 5 (1+1+2+1) | +2:05.7 |
| 17 | 7 | Kaisa Mäkäräinen | Finland | 38:01.3 | 5 (1+1+1+2) | +2:06.8 |
| 18 | 13 | Gabriela Soukalová | Czech Republic | 38:15.2 | 5 (0+3+1+1) | +2:20.7 |
| 19 | 15 | Veronika Vítková | Czech Republic | 38:19.6 | 2 (0+2+0+0) | +2:25.1 |
| 20 | 29 | Karin Oberhofer | Italy | 38:19.9 | 4 (3+0+1+0) | +2:25.4 |
| 21 | 17 | Ekaterina Glazyrina | Russia | 38:23.6 | 2 (1+0+1+0) | +2:29.1 |
| 22 | 23 | Franziska Hildebrand | Germany | 38:31.8 | 2 (1+0+1+0) | +2:37.3 |
| 23 | 11 | Olga Vilukhina | Russia | 38:40.2 | 3 (1+1+0+1) | +2:45.7 |
| 24 | 19 | Ann Kristin Flatland | Norway | 38:49.9 | 3 (0+1+1+1) | +2:55.4 |
| 25 | 24 | Zhang Yan | China | 38:52.4 | 3 (0+0+0+3) | +2:57.9 |
| 26 | 21 | Nadezhda Skardino | Belarus | 38:55.6 | 3 (1+0+1+1) | +3:01.1 |
| 27 | 18 | Magdalena Gwizdoń | Poland | 39:09.5 | 6 (1+2+1+2) | +3:15.0 |
| 28 | 20 | Marie-Laure Brunet | France | 39.45.8 | 2 (1+1+0+0) | +3:51.3 |
| 29 | 30 | Ekaterina Shumilova | Russia | 44:39.3 | 5 (0+0+4+1) | +8:44.8 |
| | 6 | Valj Semerenko | Ukraine | DNF | 7 (2+3+2) | |
