= Vladimir Semakov =

Ukrainian biathlete (born 1985)

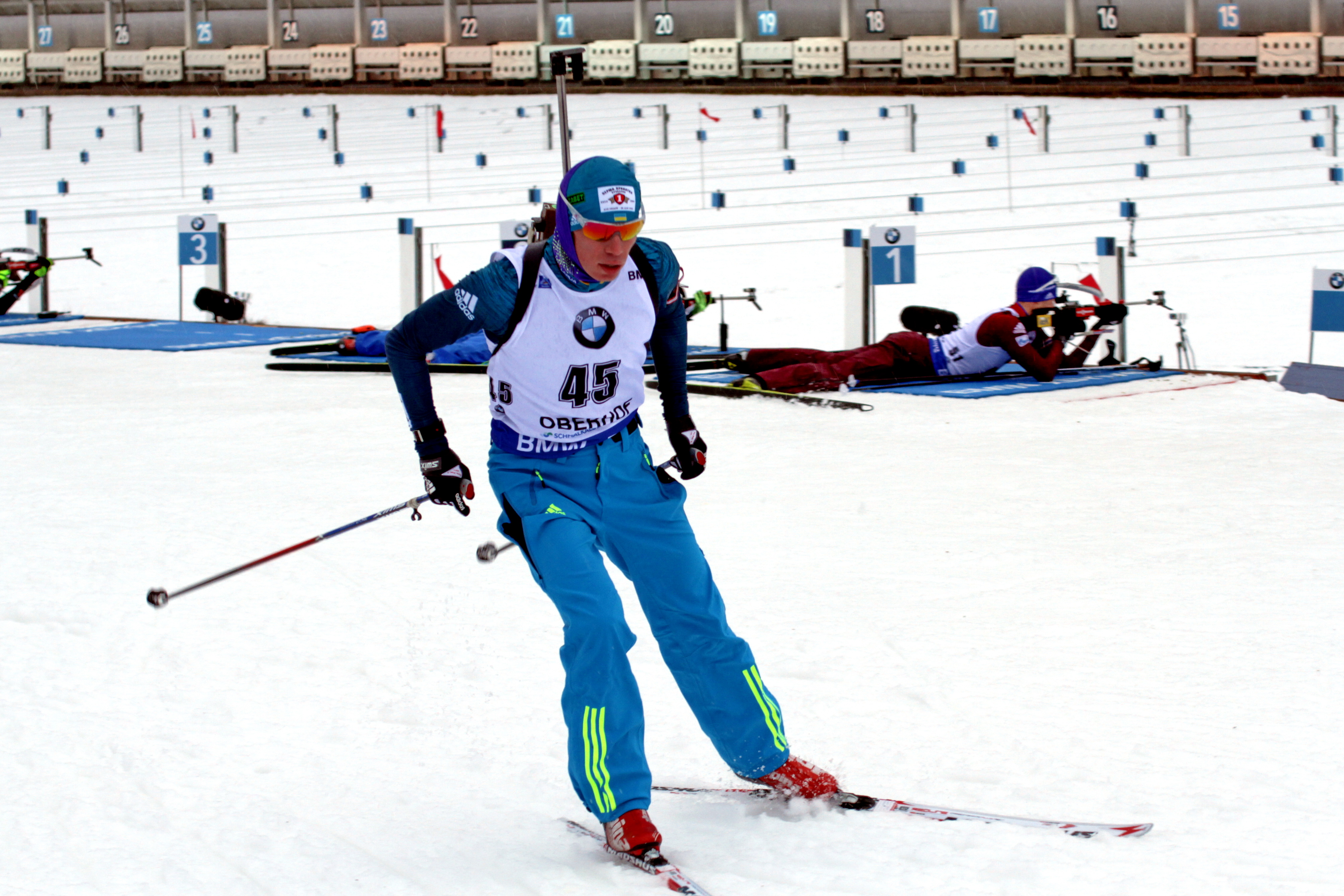
- Semakov in 2018

Personal information
- Born: 11 May 1985 (age 41) Izhevsk, Soviet Union
- Height: 1.77 m (5 ft 10 in)

Sport
- Sport: Skiing
- Club: Kyiv region club

World Cup career
- Seasons: 2004–2014 (for Russia); 2014–2018 (for Ukraine); 2018–present (for Russia)
Medal record
Men's biathlon
Representing Ukraine
Representing Russia
European Championships
Silver medal – second place	2010 Otepää	Relay
Junior European Championships
Gold medal – first place	2006 Arber	Sprint
Gold medal – first place	2006 Arber	Pursuit
Gold medal – first place	2006 Arber	Relay
- Updated on 18 December 2015

Vladimir Semakov (Russian: Владимир Сергеевич Семаков, Ukrainian: Володимир Сергійович Сємаков, born 11 May 1985, Izhevsk) is a Russian (until 2014) and Ukrainian (since 2014) biathlete of the World Cup level. He participated at 2018 Winter Olympics.

== Career ==
Being in Russian team Semakov participated only at one Junior World (in 2006 in Presque Isle, United States) and two European championships (in 2006 he had his best career results competing as junior and winning three gold medals; in 2010 he won silver in men's relay and was 6th in individual race). In 2009–10 season he had some good results at Russian Cup so he was invited to participate at IBU Cup. On 2 December 2010, he debuted in Biathlon World Cup in Swedish Östersund where he was 61st in individual race which was the worst result in Russian team in that race. After that he didn't participate in any other World Cup race as Russian athlete. His last race for Russia was on 17 December 2011, in IBU Cup in Austrian Obertilliach where he was 33rd in pursuit.

In summer 2014 Semakov together with Oleksander Zhyrnyi changed their citizenship to Ukrainian.

On 8 January 2015, he redebuted in World Cup in relay in Oberhof, Germany. He was second and unfortunately got a penalty loop but team managed to finish 5th. His first personal race for Ukraine he had next day when he finished just 79th in sprint. He participated in some more competitions that season but he didn't won any World Cup points. Three next seasons were more successful for him: he won some World Cup points and often ran in relay competitions. Up to date, his best World Cup result is 12th in sprint in Antholz-Anterselva in 2017–18 season. At 2017 World Championships he was 73rd in sprint and 6th in men's relay.

Semakov qualified to represent Ukraine at the 2018 Winter Olympics. He was 31st in individual and 78th in sprint.

== Results ==
=== Winter Olympics ===
Year	Event	IN	SP	PU	MS	RL	MRL
2018	Pyeongchang, South Korea	31	78	—	—	9	—

=== World Championships ===
Year	Event	IN	SP	PU	MS	RL	MRL
2017	Hochfilzen, Austria	—	73	—	—	6	—

=== World Cup ===
==== Rankings ====
Season	IN	SP	PU	MS	TOTAL
2015–16		63	72		72
2016–17	39	71	54	38	52

=== IBU Cup ===
==== Individual podiums ====
Season	Place	Competition	Rank
2017–18	Obertilliach, Austria	Individual	3

==== Relay podiums ====
Season	Place	Competition	Rank
2015–16	Martello, Italy	Mixed relay	3
