= Biathlon World Championships 2011 – Women's mass start =

Women's mass start at the Biathlon World Championships 2011
- Location: Khanty-Mansiysk, Russia
- Date: 12 March
- Competitors: 30 from 14 nations
- Winning time: 36:48.5

Medalists
gold medal	Magdalena Neuner	Germany
silver medal	Darya Domracheva	Belarus
bronze medal	Tora Berger	Norway

The women's mass start competition of the Biathlon World Championships 2011 was held on March 12, 2011 at 12:30 local time.

== Results ==
Rank	Bib	Name	Country	Penalties (P+P+S+S)	Time	Deficit
1st place, gold medalist(s)	1	Magdalena Neuner	Germany	4 (0+1+2+1)	36:48.5	
2nd place, silver medalist(s)	9	Darya Domracheva	Belarus	3 (2+1+0+0)	36:53.3	+4.8
3rd place, bronze medalist(s)	8	Tora Berger	Norway	3 (2+1+0+0)	37:02.5	+14.0
4	2	Kaisa Mäkäräinen	Finland	3 (1+1+1+0)	37:12.7	+24.2
5	15	Olga Zaitseva	Russia	2 (0+1+0+1)	37:20.1	+31.6
6	3	Helena Ekholm	Sweden	2 (0+1+0+1)	37:23.2	+34.7
7	12	Marie Dorin	France	1 (0+0+0+1)	37:28.3	+39.8
8	14	Marie-Laure Brunet	France	2 (1+0+0+1)	37:32.6	+44.1
9	5	Anastasiya Kuzmina	Slovakia	3 (1+0+2+0)	37:33.1	+44.6
10	21	Michela Ponza	Italy	2 (0+0+0+2)	37:58.8	+1:10.3
11	4	Tina Bachmann	Germany	5 (2+1+1+1)	38:07.0	+1:18.5
12	7	Andrea Henkel	Germany	5 (2+1+1+1)	38:07.7	+1:18.5
13	16	Miriam Gössner	Germany	6 (1+1+2+2)	38:29.3	+1:40.8
14	17	Ekaterina Yurlova	Russia	4 (1+1+1+1)	38:31.8	+1:43.3
15	11	Valj Semerenko	Ukraine	4 (1+1+0+2)	38:34.1	+1:45.6
16	18	Nadezhda Skardino	Belarus	1 (0+0+0+1)	38:37.5	+1:49.0
17	10	Anna Carin Zidek	Sweden	4 (2+0+2+0)	38:45.7	+1:57.2
18	20	Agnieszka Cyl	Poland	2 (1+0+1+0)	38:50.2	+2:01.7
19	23	Éva Tófalvi	Romania	2 (1+0+1+0)	38:57.7	+2:09.2
20	27	Dorothea Wierer	Italy	3 (1+0+1+1)	39:00.0	+2:11.5
21	26	Anais Bescond	France	4 (1+1+2+0)	39:00.9	+2:12.4
22	19	Anna Bogaliy-Titovets	Russia	3 (0+2+1+0)	39:03.2	+2:14.7
23	24	Olena Pidhrushna	Ukraine	3 (1+0+2+0)	39:11.6	+2:23.1
24	6	Vita Semerenko	Ukraine	4 (4+0+0+0)	39:19.3	+2:30.8
25	25	Anna Maria Nilsson	Sweden	2 (0+0+1+1)	39:25.1	+2:36.6
26	29	Inna Suprun	Ukraine	4 (0+1+1+2)	39:35.7	+2:47.2
27	22	Jana Gerekova	Slovakia	4 (2+1+1+0)	40:01.4	+3:12.9
28	30	Fanny Welle-Strand Horn	Norway	5 (1+2+0+2)	40:51.5	+4:03.0
29	28	Veronika Vítková	Czech Republic	6 (1+3+2+0)	42:33.4	+5:44.9
	13	Teja Gregorin	Slovenia	1 (0+0+1+0)	DSQ	
