= Emőke Szőcs =

Hungarian biathlonist (born 1985)

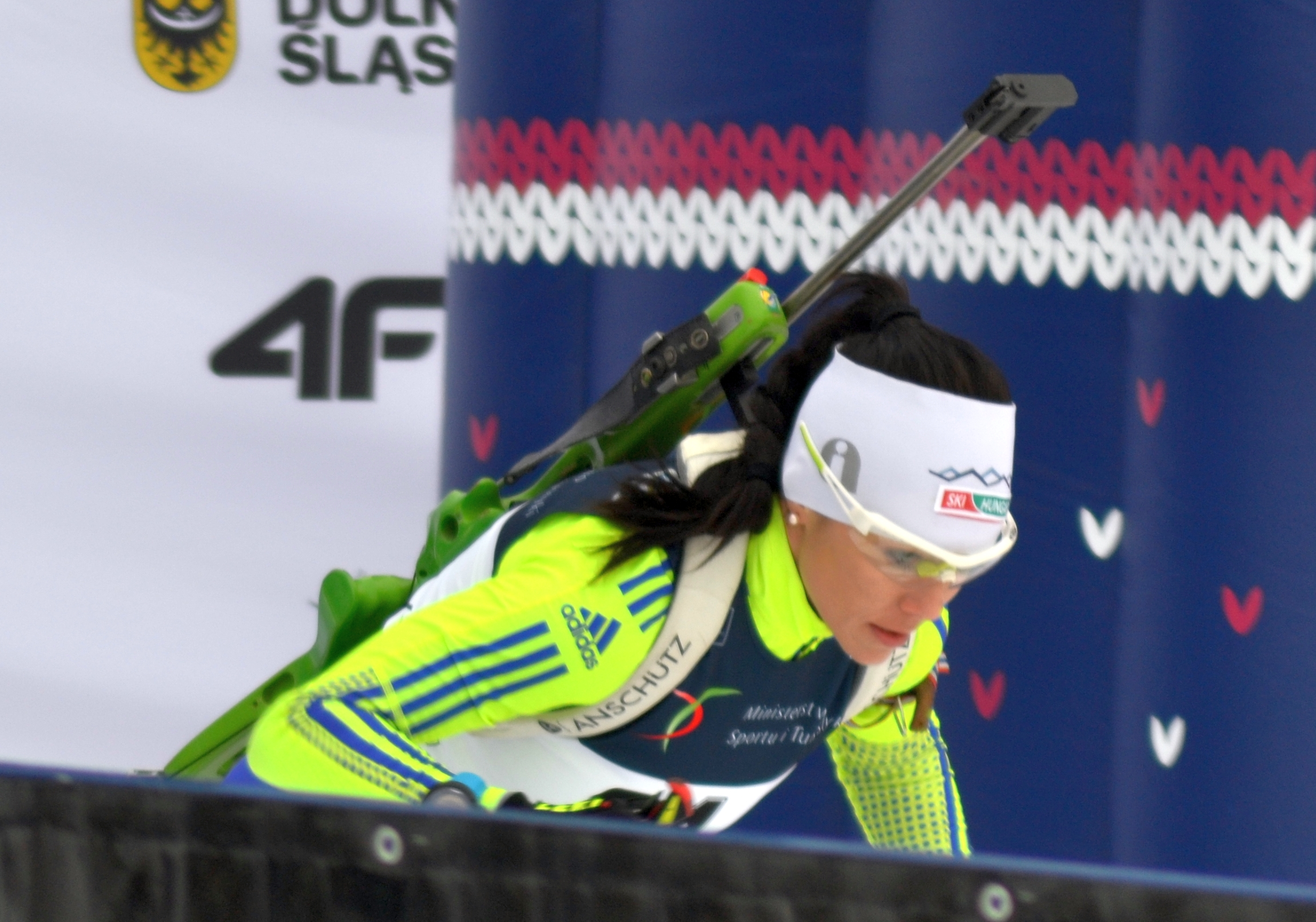
2017 European Biathlon Championships

Emőke Szőcs (born 20 October 1985) is a Hungarian professional biathlonist.

Szőcs, who is ethnic Hungarian, was born in Miercurea Ciuc, Romania. She has been a member of the Romanian biathlon team since 2002 and achieved her best result in the Biathlon World Cup in 2008, when she finished 68th in Hochfilzen.

In 2010, although Szőcs clinched the qualifying spot for the Winter Olympics, she was dropped from the traveling squad, following that Emőke thought she has to change. As she told an interview, as an ethnic Hungarian it was a dream for her to represent Hungary, and this unfair made her to move and opted to compete for Hungary in the future. From November 2011, after the International Biathlon Union and the Romanian Ski Federation approved her decision, Szőcs officially races for Hungary.
