= Vita Semerenko =

Ukrainian biathlete (born 1986)

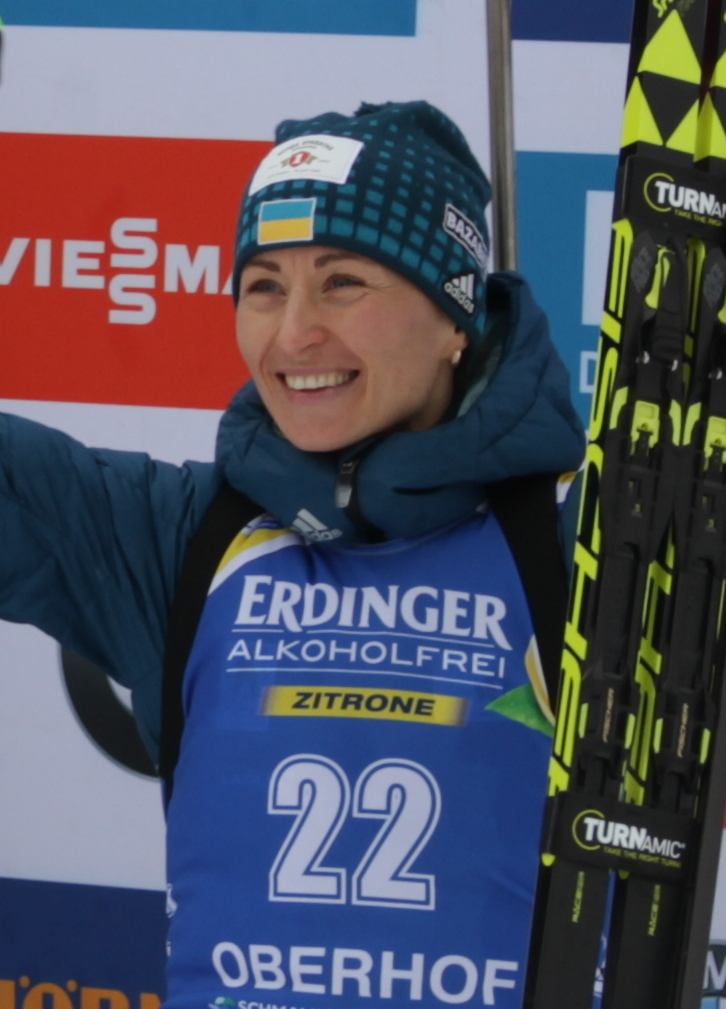

Personal information
- Full name: Vita Oleksandrivna Semerenko
- Born: 18 January 1986 (age 40) Krasnopillia, Sumy Oblast, Ukrainian SSR
- Height: 1.60 m (5 ft 3 in)
- Weight: 57 kg (126 lb)

Sport

Professional information
- Sport: Biathlon
- Club: Dynamo
- World Cup debut: 2006

Olympic Games
- Teams: 3 (2010–2018)
- Medals: 2 (1 gold)

World Championships
- Teams: 0 (2007–2013, 2019–2020)
- Medals: 7 (0 gold)

World Cup
- Seasons: 2005–2022
- Individual podiums: 10 (incl. 3 at World Champ.)
Medal record
Representing Ukraine
Women's biathlon
Olympic Games
Gold medal – first place	2014 Sochi	4 x 6 km relay
Bronze medal – third place	2014 Sochi	7.5 km sprint
World Championships
Silver medal – second place	2008 Östersund	4 x 6 km relay
Silver medal – second place	2013 Nové Město	4 x 6 km relay
Bronze medal – third place	2011 Khanty-Mansiysk	15 km individual
Bronze medal – third place	2012 Ruhpolding	7.5 km sprint
Bronze medal – third place	2013 Nové Město	7.5 km sprint
Bronze medal – third place	2019 Östersund	4 x 6 km relay
Bronze medal – third place	2020 Antholz	4 x 6 km relay
European Championships
Gold medal – first place	2008 Nové Město	Relay
Gold medal – first place	2009 Ufa	Relay
Gold medal – first place	2010 Otepää	Pursuit
Gold medal – first place	2011 Ridanna	Relay
Gold medal – first place	2012 Osrblie	Relay
Silver medal – second place	2007 Bansko	Sprint
Silver medal – second place	2009 Ufa	Pursuit
Silver medal – second place	2010 Otepää	Relay
Bronze medal – third place	2007 Bansko	Relay
Bronze medal – third place	2010 Otepää	Sprint
Bronze medal – third place	2021 Duszniki-Zdrój	Mixed relay
Youth World Championships
Silver medal – second place	2005 Kontiolahti	10 km individual
Silver medal – second place	2005 Kontiolahti	3 × 6 km relay
Junior European Championships
Bronze medal – third place	2005 Novosibirsk	Girl's relay
Universiade
Gold medal – first place	2011 Erzurum	Sprint
Gold medal – first place	2011 Erzurum	Pursuit
Gold medal – first place	2011 Erzurum	Mixed Relay
Gold medal – first place	2007 Turin	Pursuit
Silver medal – second place	2007 Turin	Relay
Bronze medal – third place	2007 Turin	Individual
Bronze medal – third place	2007 Turin	Sprint
- Updated on 22 February 2020

Vita Semerenko (Ukrainian: Віта Олександрівна Семеренко; born 18 January 1986) is a Ukrainian biathlete. She is Olympic champion in women's relay, Olympic medalist and multiple World championships medalist. She is one of the most successful Ukrainian winter athletes.

Biathlete Valentyna is her twin sister.

== Career ==
When she was in the fourth grade of elementary school, she took up cross-country skiing together with her twin sister Valentyna. But later they decided to switch to biathlon. In 2005 she won two medals at Junior World Championships and one at Junior European Championships. Since the competition in Ukrainian national team was quite rigorous, only Valja managed to qualify for 2006 Winter Olympics.

In 2005–06 World Cup season she debuted in German Oberhof in women's relay which was her only World Cup race in that season. Next season she had her first World Cup race – individual race in Swedish Östersund where she with three misses finished 23rd as the best among Ukrainians. Her first World Cup podium came on 20 December 2008, in Austrian Hochfilzen, where she was second in sprint.

She also competes sometimes in summer biathlon competitions, including World and European championships. But Vita's greatest achievement in this modification of biathlon was in 2012 when she won City-Biathlon in Püttlingen, Germany, which was very popular among leading biathletes.

She won the silver medal in 4×6 km relay event at the Biathlon World Championships 2008. In the Olympic cycle between 2010 Winter Olympics and 2014 Winter Olympics she always was on the World Championships podiums winning bronze in individual in 2011, bronze in sprint in 2012 and bronze once again in sprint in 2013 (her teammate Olena Pidhrushna became then World Champion). Apart from her individual medals she also was second in women's relay in 2013.

She represented Ukraine at the 2010 Winter Olympics in Vancouver and at the 2014 Winter Olympics in Sochi. In Vancouver she was one of national hopes for a medal but she didn't achieve high results.

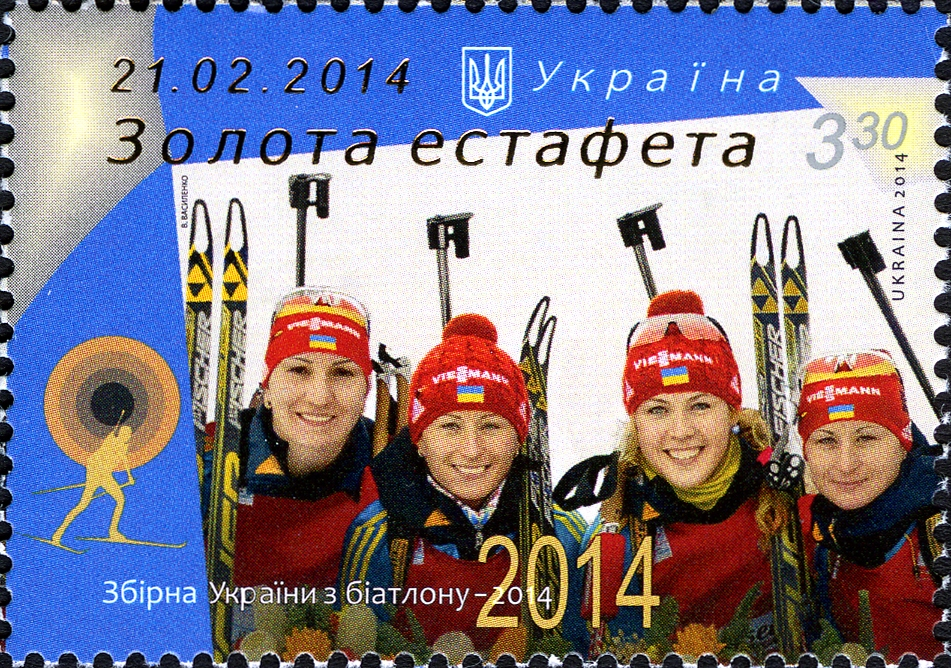
Ukrainian stamp with 2014 Olympic champions (Vita – first from right)

On 9 February 2014, she got her bronze medal in women's sprint competition thus winning the first medal for Ukraine at the 2014 Winter Olympics. On 21 February, together with Juliya Dzhyma, Valj Semerenko and Olena Pidhrushna she won the gold medal in the Women's relay at the 2014 Winter Olympics, in Sochi, Russia. This is still the greatest achievement for Ukraine in biathlon.

Due to illness, surgery and then pregnancy she missed almost three seasons, returning to competitions only in March 2016.

She qualified to represent Ukraine at the 2018 Winter Olympics. She competed in all personal races at the Games with 14th place in sprint being her personal best.

She received the Best Athlete of a Month award from National Olympic Committee of Ukraine for four times – in March 2009, March 2010, March 2011, March 2012.

== Personal life ==
Vita is married to a footballer of a regional league Andriy Patsiuk. On 19 September 2016, she gave a birth to the son whose name is Mark.

She graduated from Sumy State Pedagogical Makarenko University.

== Results ==
=== Winter Olympics ===
Year	Event	IN	SP	PU	MS	RL	MRL
2010	Vancouver, Canada	22	34	42		6	
2014	Sochi, Russia	29	3	10	16	1	
2018	Pyeongchang, South Korea	63	14	18	24	11	

=== World Championships ===
Year	Event	IN	SP	PU	MS	RL	MRL
2007	Rasen-Antholz, Italy	20	12	20	20	9	
2008	Östersund, Sweden	13	35	DNS	4	2	
2009	Pyeongchang, South Korea	12	26	19	4	DNF	
2010	Khanty-Mansiysk, Russia						6
2011	Khanty-Mansiysk, Russia	3	18	17	25	DSQ	8
2012	Ruhpolding, Germany	16	3	8	7	6	14
2013	Nové Město na Moravě, Czech Republic	5	3	9	4	2	

=== World Cup ===
==== Individual podiums ====
Season	Place	Competition	Rank
2008–09	Hochfilzen, Austria	Sprint	2
2008–09	Vancouver, Canada	Individual	3
2009–10	Oslo, Norway	Mass start	2
2011–12	Khanty-Mansiysk, Russia	Sprint	2
2011–12	Khanty-Mansiysk, Russia	Pursuit	3
2017–18	Annecy, France	Sprint	3
2017–18	Oberhof, Germany	Pursuit	3

==== Relay podiums ====
Season	Place	Competition	Rank
2008–09	Oberhof, Germany	Relay	1
2010–11	Hochfilzen, Austria	Relay	2
2010–11	Pokljuka, Slovenia	Mixed relay	2
2012–13	Hochfilzen, Austria	Relay	2
2012–13	Oberhof, Germany	Relay	1
2013–14	Hochfilzen, Austria	Relay	1
2013–14	Ruhpolding, Germany	Relay	3
2013–14	Annecy, France	Relay	2
2017–18	Hochfilzen, Austria	Relay	2
2017–18	Kontiolahti, Finland	Mixed relay	2

==== Positions ====
Season	Individual	Sprint	Pursuit	Mass starts	TOTAL
2006–07	38	51	52	40	46
2007–08	18	38		24	37
2008–09	6	10	18	17	13
2009–10	24	23	19	13	19
2010–11	7	18	18	18	15
2011–12	20	12	13	10	12
2012–13	16	10	14	3	10
2013–14	50	29	23		31
2014–15	missed				
2015–16	missed				
2016–17	missed				

=== IBU Cup ===
==== Relay podiums ====
Season	Place	Competition	Rank
2016–17	Otepää, Estonia	Mixed relay	3
2016–17	Otepää, Estonia	Mixed relay	3
