= Sirli Hanni =

Estonian biathlete (born 1985)

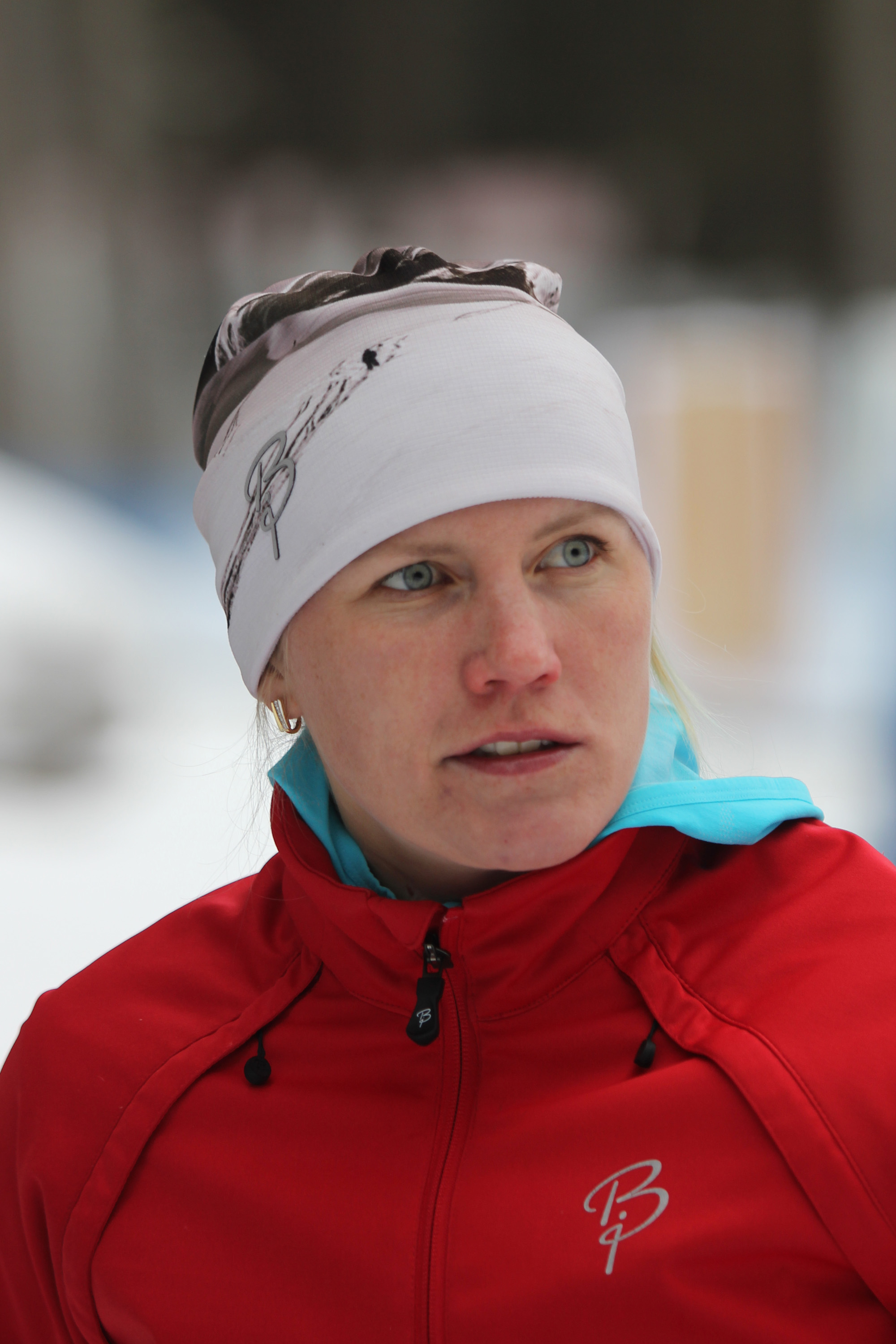

Personal information
- Born: 27 October 1985 (age 40) Vastseliina, Estonia

Sport

Professional information
- Sport: Biathlon
Medal record
Junior World Championships
Bronze medal – third place	2005 Kontiolahti	3 × 6 km relay
Youth World Championships
Silver medal – second place	2004 Haute Maurienne	10 km individual

Sirli Hanni (born 27 October 1985) is a retired Estonian biathlete. She finished 18th in the 4×6 km relay and 84th in the 7.5 km sprint at the 2010 Winter Olympics in Vancouver.

== Biography ==
Hanni was born in Vastseliina, Võru County and attended Vastseliina Gymnasium, graduating in 2005. She attended the University of Tartu, graduating in 2018 with a degree in physical education and sports, and attained a master's degree in sports sciences from the University of Tartu in 2020. She was a member of the Estonian national team from 2003 to 2012. She won a total of 15 medals in biathlon at Estonian national championships between 2008 and 2015: 7 gold, 1 silver and 7 bronze. She was the Estonian women's biathlete champion twice, in 2008 and 2009.
