= Kristel Viigipuu =

Estonian biathlete (born 1990)

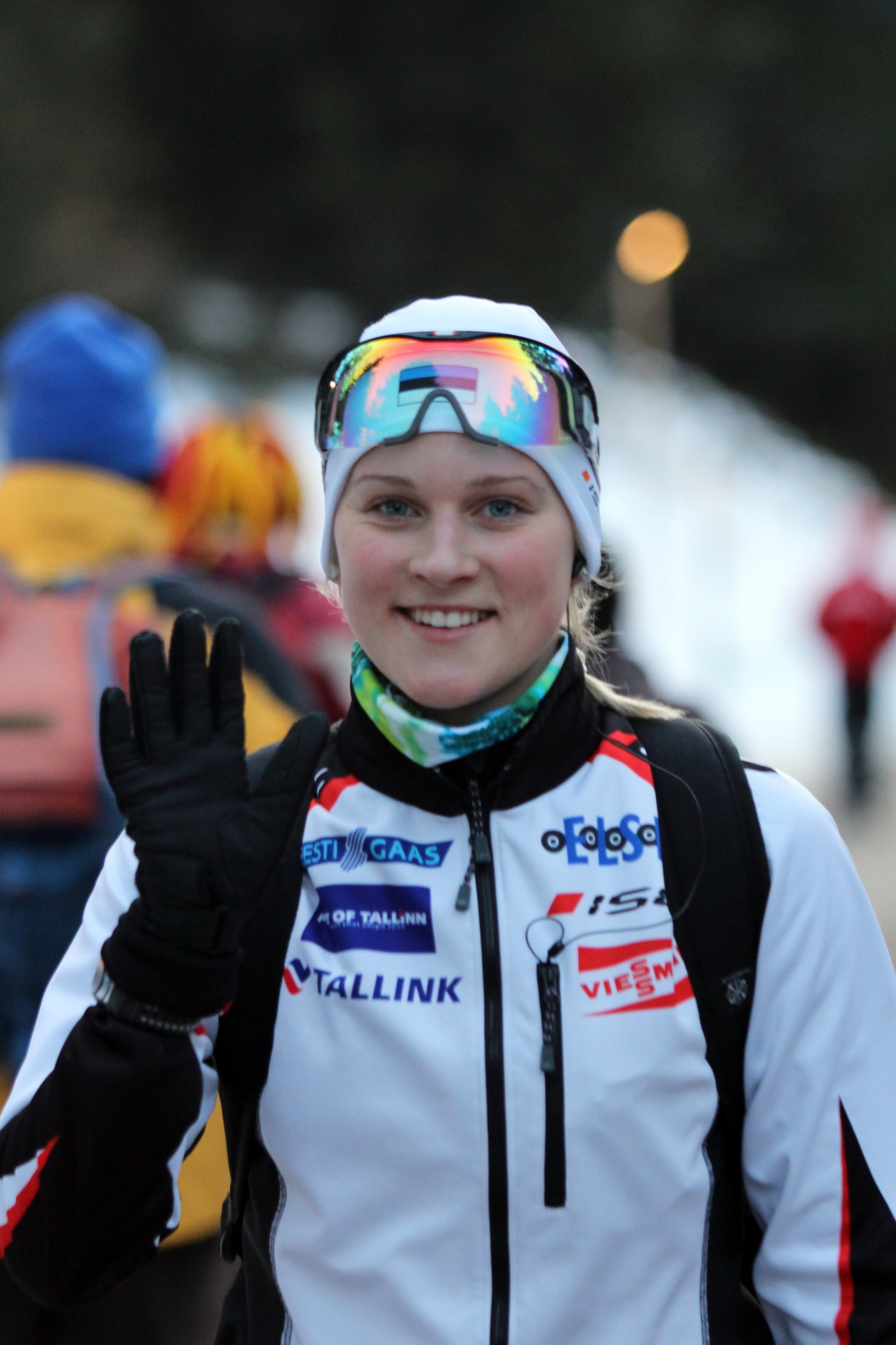
Viigipuu in Antholz in 2011

Kristel Viigipuu (born 19 August 1990 in Tartu) is a former Estonian biathlete. She finished 18th in the 4×6 km relay and 83rd in the 7.5 km sprint at the 2010 Winter Olympics in Vancouver, British Columbia, Canada.
