= Anete Brice =

Latvian cross-country skier (born 1991)

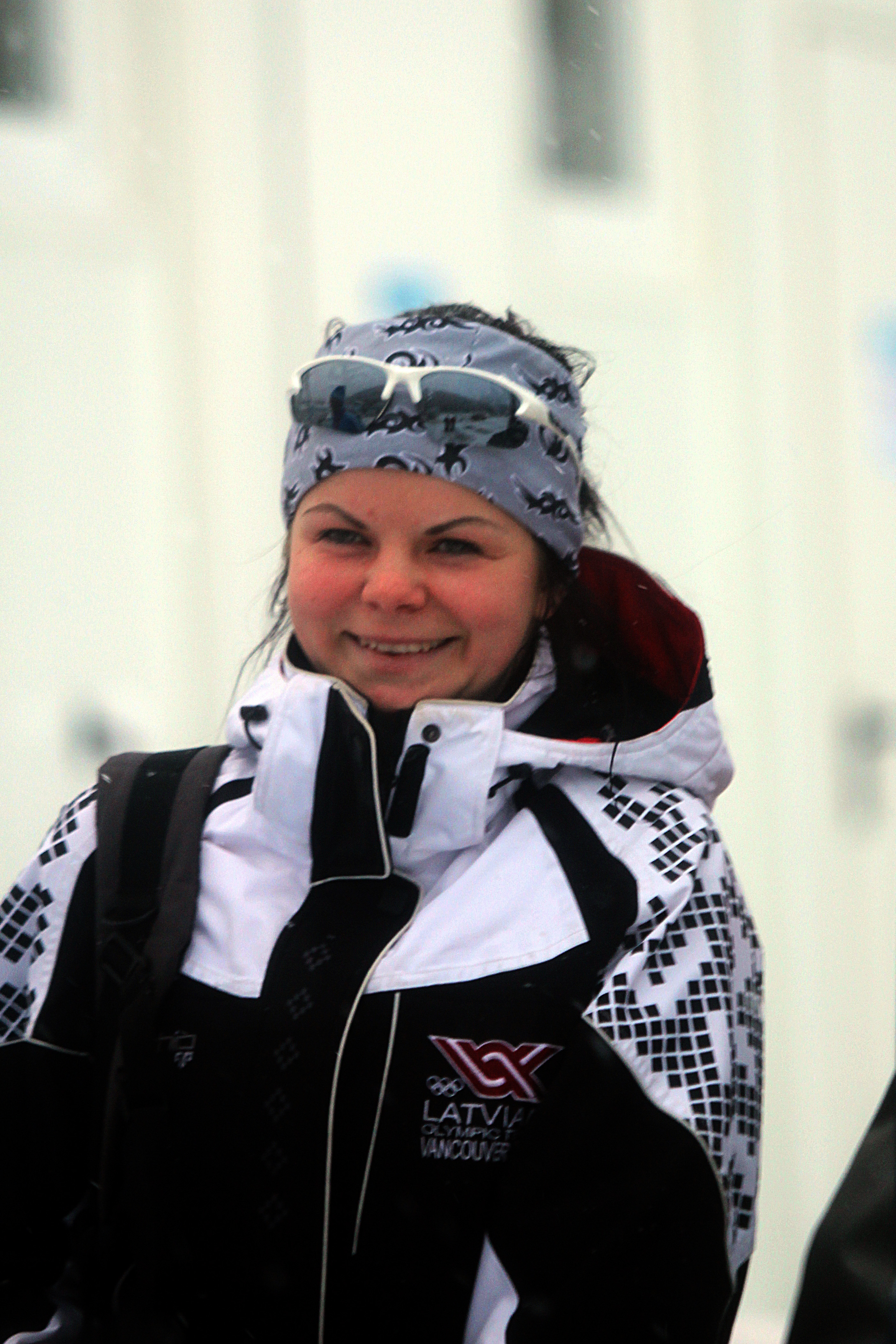
- Brice in 2011

Personal information
- Born: 13 November 1991 (age 34) Rīga, Latvia
- Height: 164 cm (5 ft 5 in)
- Weight: 50 kg (110 lb)

Sport
- Country: Latvia
- Sport: Cross-country skiing

Anete Brice (born 13 November 1991) is a Latvian cross-country skier who has competed since 2007. She finished 70th in the 10 km event at the 2010 Winter Olympics in Vancouver. Brice finished 78th in the individual sprint event at the FIS Nordic World Ski Championships 2009 in Liberec. Her parents are Latvian biathletes Ilmārs Bricis and Anžela Brice.

Her best career finish was eighth in a 5 km event at Estonia in 2010.
