= Inga Paškovska =

Latvian cross-country skier (born 1992)

Inga Paškovska (born 20 January 1992) is a cross-country skier from Latvia. Her World Cup debut came in 2017. Inga Paškovska is set to compete for Latvia at the 2018 Winter Olympics.
