= Alexandra Camenșcic =

Moldovan cross-country skier (born 1988)

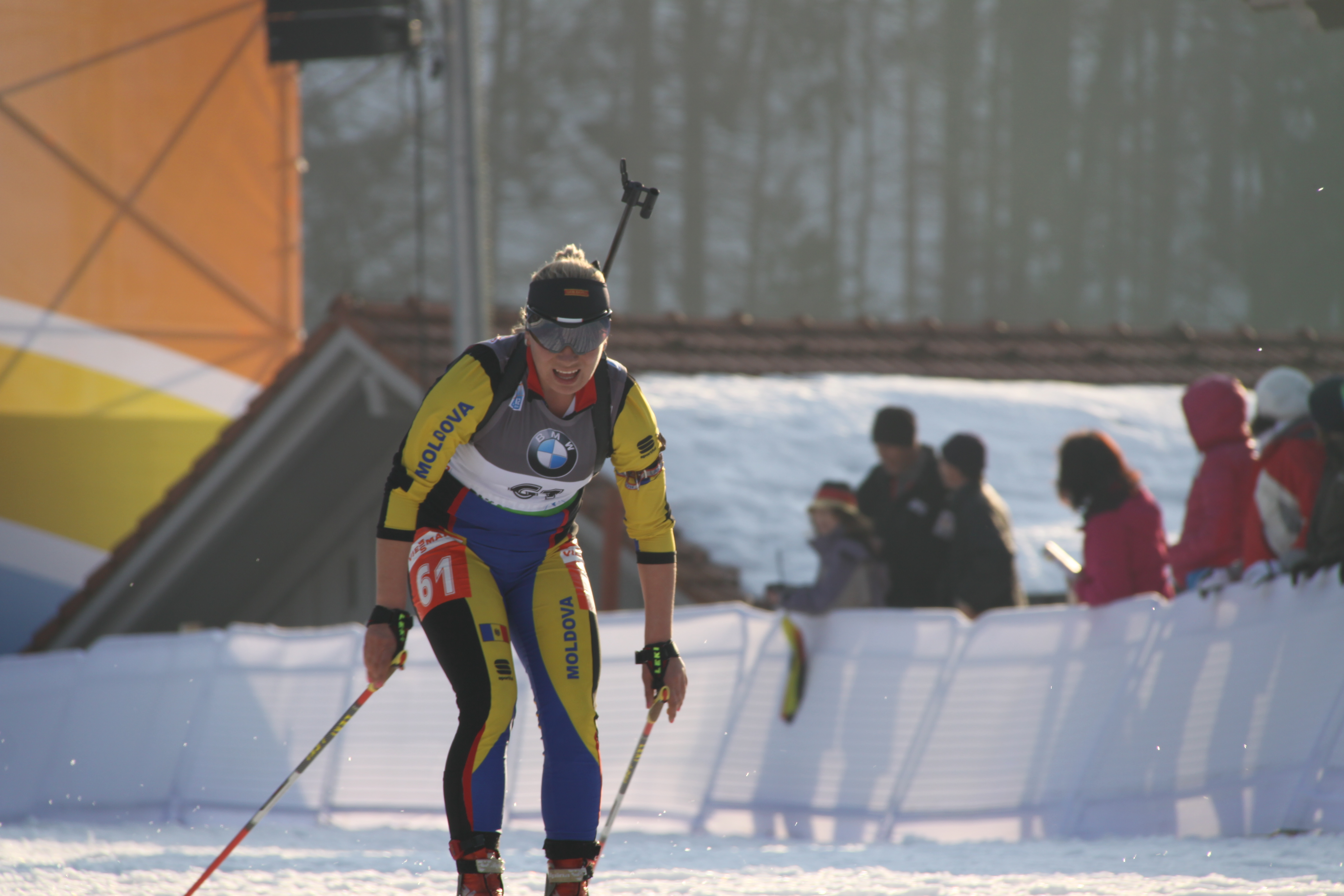
Alexandra Camenșcic

Alexandra Camenscic (born 28 August 1988) is a Moldovan cross-country skier who has competed since 2009. She finished 71st in the 10 km event at the 2010 Winter Olympics in Vancouver.

Brice finished 84th in the individual sprint event at the FIS Nordic World Ski Championships 2009 in Liberec.

Her best career finish was tenth in a 7.5 km mass start event at Slovakia in 2009. Now she teaches the sport of Biathlon in the Moldovan town of Criuleni.
