= Laura Spector =

American biathlete (born 1987)

Personal information
- Born: October 30, 1987 (age 38) United States

Sport
- Sport: Skiing

World Cup career
- Seasons: 2008-2012
- Indiv. wins: 0
- Updated on April 29, 2020

Laura Spector (born October 30, 1987) is an American biathlete who competed from 2008 to 2012.

Her best World Cup finish was 19th in a sprint in Oberhof, Germany in 2011. At the 2010 Winter Olympics she finished 77th in the 7.5 km sprint event and 65th in the 15 km individual. Spector completed her undergraduate degree at Dartmouth College in 2011, with a B.A. in Biological Sciences and a minor in Jewish Studies. In 2015, Spector completed a Master's degree in medicine at the Stanford University School of Medicine, and she is currently pursuing a PhD in Genetics at Stanford.
