= Nerys Jones =

British biathlete (born 1984)

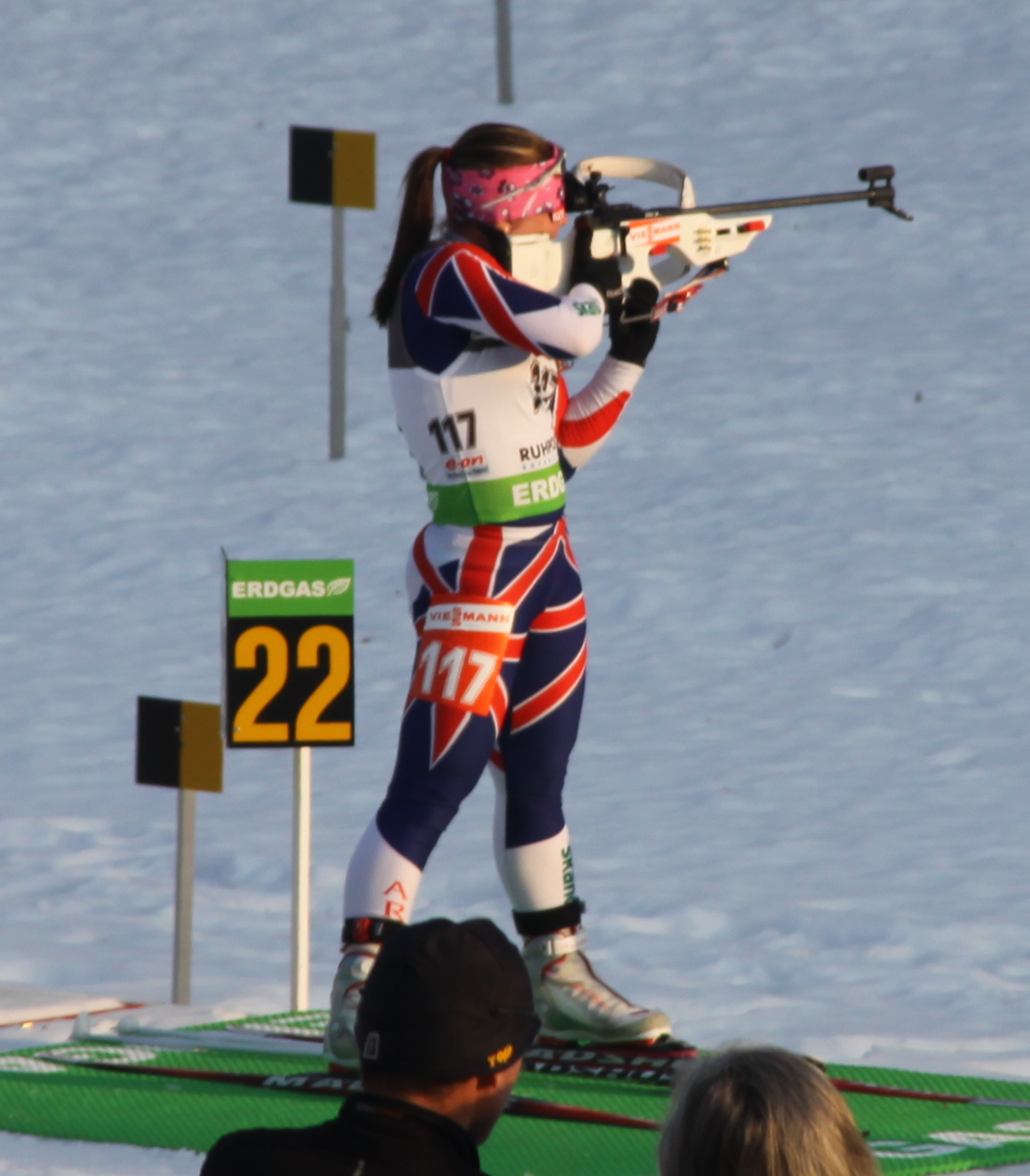
- Nerys Jones at the 2012 world cup

Personal information
- Nationality: British
- Born: 30 November 1984 (age 40)

Sport
- Sport: Biathlon

Nerys Jones (born 30 November 1984) is a British biathlete. Jones competed in the 2014/15 World Cup season, and represented the United Kingdom at the Biathlon World Championships 2015 in Kontiolahti.
