= Sarah Murphy (biathlete) =

New Zealand biathlete

Sarah Jane Spidy Murphy (born February 16, 1988, in Banff, Alberta) is a New Zealand biathlete. She represented New Zealand at the 2010 Winter Olympics. She was the first Kiwi Olympic biathlete.

Born in Canada to a New Zealand mother and a Canadian father, she was raised in Canmore, Alberta, and Nelson, New Zealand.

At the 2010 Winter Olympics in Vancouver, Murphy finished 82nd in both the 7.5 km and 15 km events and did not compete in the 10 km pursuit.

Her best performance to date has been to finish 45th in a field of 96 at a World Cup event in Germany in January 2010.

== Cross-country skiing results ==
All results are sourced from the International Ski Federation (FIS).

=== World Championships ===
Year	Age	10 km individual	15 km skiathlon	30 km mass start	Sprint	4 × 5 km relay	Team sprint
2013	25	—	67	—	—	—	—

=== World Cup ===
==== Season standings ====
Season	Age	Discipline standings			Ski Tour standings		
Season	Age	Overall	Distance	Sprint	Nordic Opening	Tour de Ski	World Cup Final
2013	25	NC	NC	—	—	—	—
