= Lili Drčar =

Slovenian biathlete (born 1990)

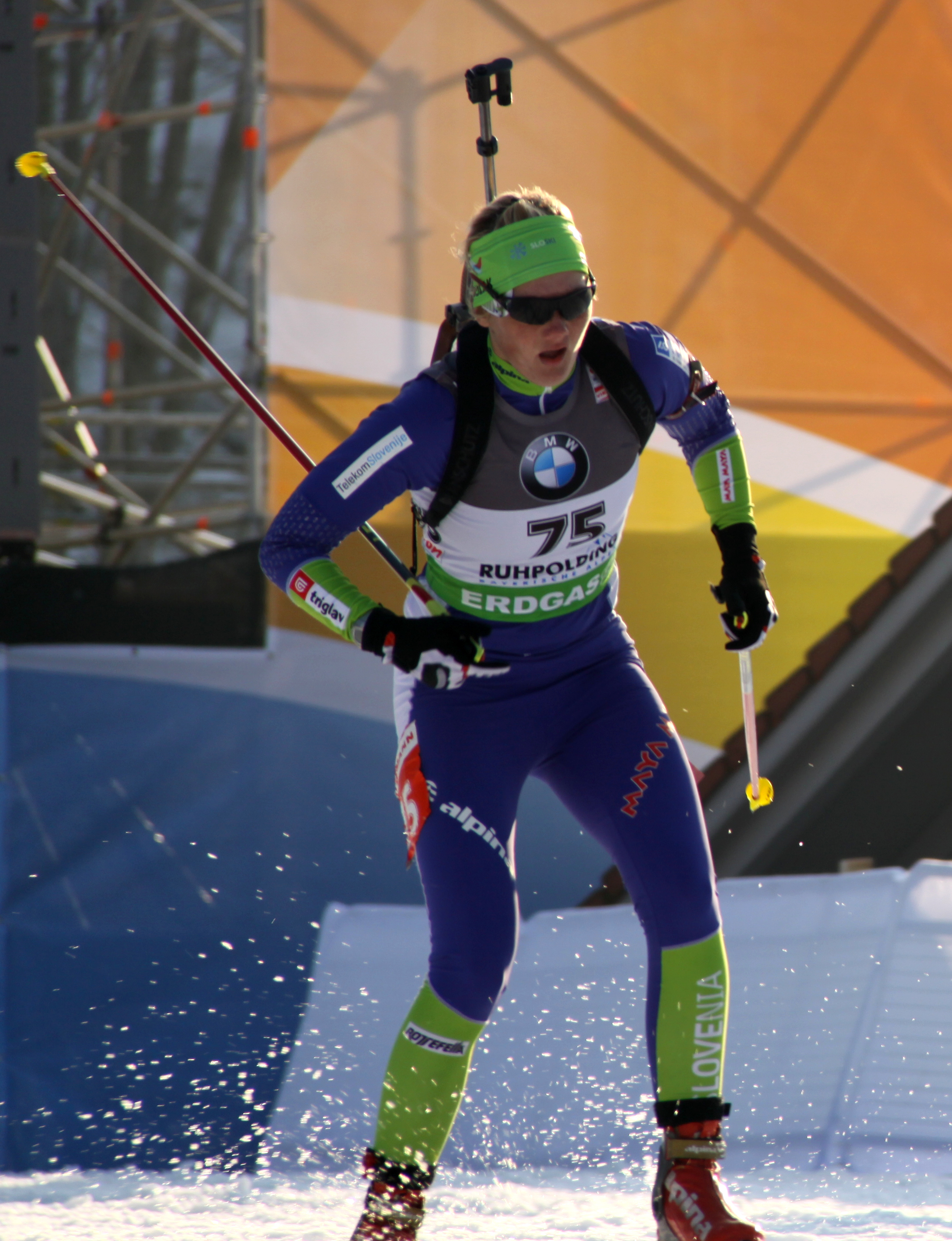
Lili Drčar, 2012

Lili Drčar (born April 12, 1990) is a Slovenian biathlete.

Lili Drčar ran since 2006 in the European Youth Cup. Multiple times she reached there in the top ten results. In 2007 Martell and 2008 Ruhpolding she took part in World Youth. Championships. Best result in 2008 was a 19th in the singles. In the Junior European Championships 2008 Drčar shoots occupied 17 to 21. In 2008 the young Slovenian debut in Ruhpolding in the Biathlon World Cup. There she was 86th in the Sprint and 13th in the relay race. Shortly after she took to the Biathlon World Championships 2008 part in Östersund and was used in three races. In the individual it was ranked 89th in the Sprint, it was 90th and 12 with the Slovenian Women's Relay in the next year was Drčar in Pyeongchang is used again at the World Championship and was ranked 101st in the single and 98th was of the Sprint race.
