= Adele Walker =

British biathlete (born 1976)

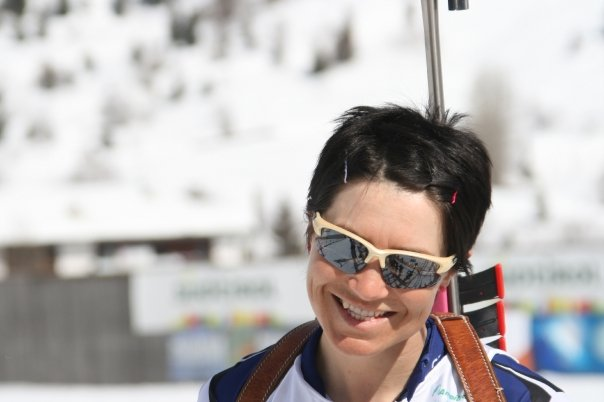
- IBU-Cup Ridnaun 2009
- Born: 10 August 1976 (age 48); Whitehaven, England, UK
- Occupation(s): Biathlete, Soldier
- Height: 1.67 m (5 ft 6 in)
- Spouse: Marc Walker

Adele Walker (born 10 August 1976) (née Turner) is a British former biathlete.

== See also ==
- Biathlon World Cup
- Biathlon World Championships
- List of Olympic medalists in biathlon
- Paralympic biathlon
