= Darya Domracheva =

Belarusian biathlete and coach

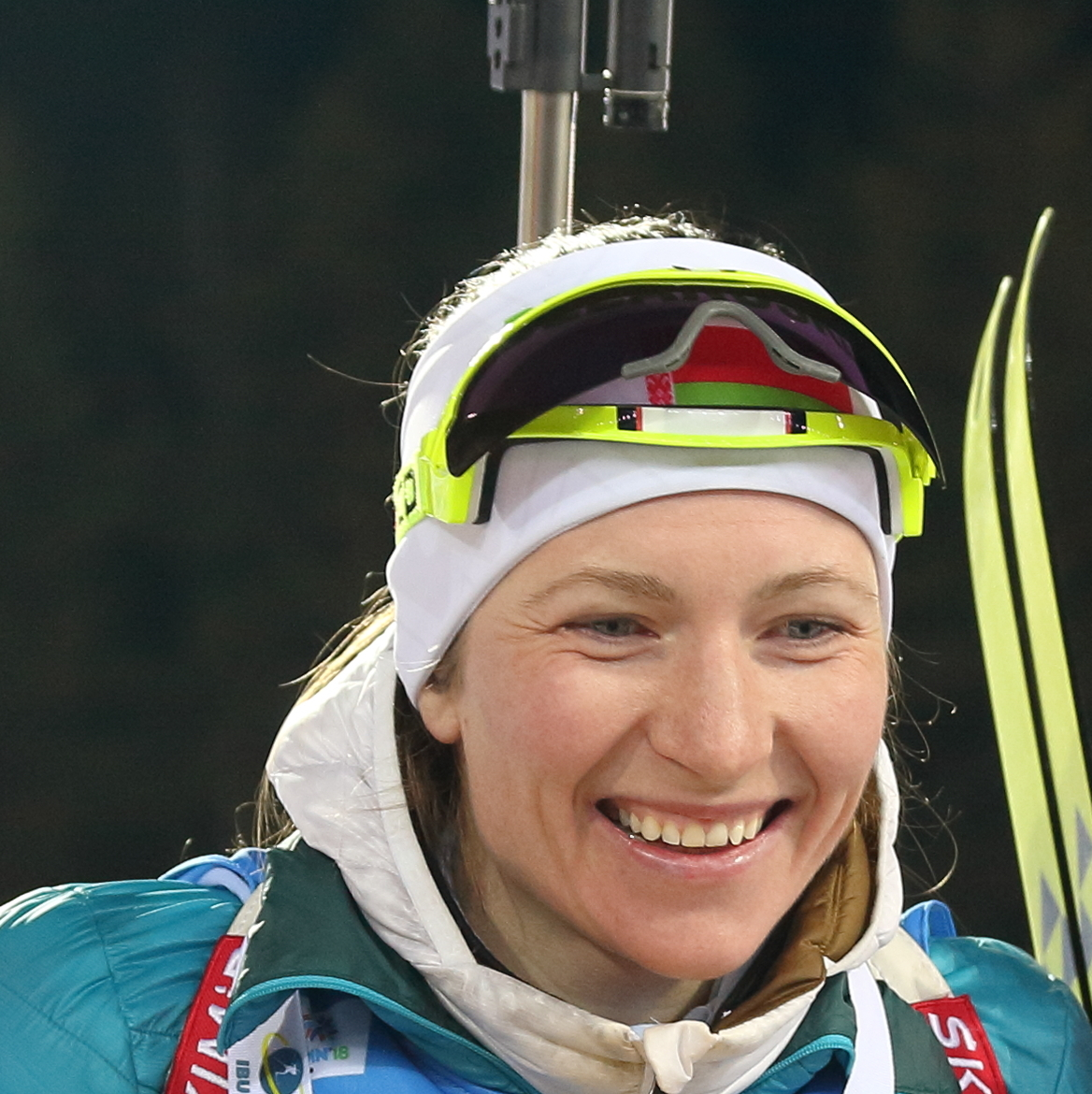
- Domracheva in 2018

Personal information
- Full name: Darya Uladzimirauna Domracheva
- Born: 3 August 1986 (age 40) Minsk, Byelorussian SSR, Soviet Union (now Belarus)
- Height: 1.68 m (5 ft 6 in)
- Spouse: Ole Einar Bjørndalen (m. 2016)
- Website: daryadomracheva.by

Sport

Professional information
- Sport: Biathlon
- Club: Dynamo Minsk

Olympic Games
- Teams: 3 (2010, 2014, 2018)
- Medals: 6 (4 gold)

World Championships
- Teams: 8 (2007, 2008, 2009, 2010, 2011, 2012, 2013, 2015, 2017)
- Medals: 6 (2 gold)

World Cup
- Seasons: 9
- Individual victories: 34
- Individual podiums: 81
- Overall titles: 1
- Discipline titles: 5
Medal record
Event	1st	2nd	3rd
Olympic Games	4	1	1
World Championships	2	4	1
Total	6	5	2
Women's biathlon
Representing Belarus
Olympic Games
Gold medal – first place	2014 Sochi	15 km individual
Gold medal – first place	2014 Sochi	10 km pursuit
Gold medal – first place	2014 Sochi	12.5 km mass start
Gold medal – first place	2018 Pyeongchang	4×6 km relay
Silver medal – second place	2018 Pyeongchang	12.5 km mass start
Bronze medal – third place	2010 Vancouver	15 km individual
World Championships
Gold medal – first place	2012 Ruhpolding	10 km pursuit
Gold medal – first place	2013 Nové Město	12.5 km mass start
Silver medal – second place	2008 Östersund	Mixed relay
Silver medal – second place	2011 Khanty-Mansiysk	12.5 km mass start
Silver medal – second place	2012 Ruhpolding	7.5 km sprint
Silver medal – second place	2017 Hochfilzen	10 km pursuit
Bronze medal – third place	2011 Khanty-Mansiysk	4×6 km relay
Junior World Championships
Silver medal – second place	2007 Martell	7.5 km sprint
Silver medal – second place	2007 Martell	10 km pursuit
Bronze medal – third place	2006 Presque Isle	10 km pursuit
Youth World Championships
Gold medal – first place	2005 Kontiolahti	6 km sprint
Gold medal – first place	2005 Kontiolahti	7.5 km pursuit

Darya Uladzimirauna Domracheva (Belarusian: Дар’я Уладзіміраўна Домрачэва; born 3 August 1986) is a retired Belarusian biathlete and coach who competed in the Biathlon World Cup from 2006 to 2018. She won a gold medal in the 4×6 km relay and a silver medal in the mass start competition at the 2018 Winter Olympics, three gold medals in the pursuit, individual, and mass start competitions at the 2014 Winter Olympics, and a bronze medal in the individual competition at the 2010 Winter Olympics. She was a Biathlon World Cup overall winner for the 2014–15 season.

== Career ==
Domracheva started her sports career with cross-country skiing in 1992 but switched to biathlon in 1999. She originally represented Russia at the junior level but received an offer to transfer to Belarus in 2004. She joined Belarus’ national biathlon team in 2006. Domracheva won sprint and pursuit at the 2005 IBU Youth and Junior World Championships in Kontiolahti (Finland). She finished 40th in the individual race.

Domracheva took 3rd place in the pursuit and 4th place in the individual events at the 2006 Junior World Championships in Presque Isle, Maine. In 2007, she picked up two silver medals in sprint and pursuit at the Junior World Championships in Martell, Italy.

Her breakthrough came during the 2008/2009 season when she earned two third places and one second place.

At the 2010 Winter Olympic Games in Vancouver, she won the bronze medal in the Women's 15-kilometer individual race at the Whistler Olympic Park venue. Later in the same season, on 13 March, she won her first World Cup race in the sprint in Kontiolahti, Finland. The next day she also won the pursuit.

Domracheva was named Belarus' Female Athlete of the Year in 2010, and was also given the title of Honoured Master of Sport that year.

She continued to improve after the Vancouver Olympics, winning 10 world cup races between the 2011–2013 seasons, as well as becoming the world champion in the pursuit in 2012, and the mass start in 2013. In 2014 Domracheva was given the Hero of Belarus medal, after winning three gold medals at the 2014 Winter Olympics.

In August 2015, Domracheva decided to skip the 2015–16 World Cup season due to mononucleosis which was diagnosed in July.

Domracheva confirmed her pregnancy in April 2016, and said that she plans to return to compete in 2017. Domracheva returned to the World Cup in January 2017 for the 2016–17 season. Her comeback ended up being successful: she won a silver medal at the 2017 world championships in the individual pursuit in preparation for the 2018 Winter Olympic Games. At the 2018 Winter Olympics, she was unable to defend her Olympic titles from Sochi; however, she was still able to pick up a silver medal in the mass start individually, and she helped the Belarusian team win the historic first Olympic gold medal in the relay. She finished the 2018 season ranked 3rd overall in the Biathlon World Cup and announced her retirement in June, citing difficulties in combining both elite sport and parenting. She finished her career as Belarus’s most decorated winter Olympian and most decorated Olympian of either the winter or summer games to compete for Belarus as an independent nation; gymnasts Olga Korbut and Vitaly Scherbo both have more medals, but Korbut competed for the Soviet Union and Scherbo only received 4 of his medals competing for Belarus; his remaining medals were won as part of the Unified Team. She was coached by former World Champion and Olympic medalist Klaus Siebert.

In September 2019, she, along with her husband Ole Einar Björndalen, were appointed as biathlon coaches for the Chinese team, preparing the team for the 2022 Olympic Winter Games in Beijing.

== World Cup of the Ski ==
Domracheva won the Pursuit World Cup 2011–2012 and won the Mass Start World Cup 2011–2012. In the Total World Cup 2011–2012 she ended the season second with 1188 points behind Magdalena Neuner's 1216 points.

In the 2010–2011 season Domracheva won the Mass Start World Cup.

Her biggest achievement was in the 2014–2015 when Domracheva won the Overall World Cup title with 1092 points, 48 points more than second and twice winner Kaisa Mäkäräinen. She also won the Sprint World Cup title in that season.

Season	Overall			Sprint			Pursuit			Individual			Mass Start		
Season	Races	Points	Position	Races	Points	Position	Races	Points	Position	Races	Points	Position	Races	Points	Position
2006/07	16/27	297	22nd	9/10	164	15th	6/8	125	15th	0/4	–	–	1/5	8	42nd
2007/08	18/26	226	26th	10/10	124	18th	6/8	76	22nd	0/3	–	–	2/5	26	34th
2008/09	23/26	776	7th	10/10	329	5th	6/7	214	8th	3/4	87	14th	4/5	146	7th
2009/10	22/25	770	6th	9/10	283	6th	5/6	199	4th	3/4	121	4th	5/5	140	8th
2010/11	26/26	862	6th	10/10	323	7th	7/7	252	5th	4/4	51	29th	5/5	236	1st
2011/12	26/26	1188	2nd	10/10	471	2nd	8/8	392	1st	3/3	116	3rd	5/5	250	1st
2012/13	26/26	924	2nd	10/10	351	2nd	8/8	251	6th	3/3	122	3rd	5/5	200	2nd
2013/14	20/22	793	3rd	8/9	254	3rd	7/8	296	3rd	2/2	92	2nd	3/3	151	1st
2014/15	25/25	1092	1st	10/10	416	1st	7/7	347	2nd	3/3	139	2nd	5/5	206	3rd
2015/16	did not start due to mononucleosis														
2016/17	16/26	394	24th	6/9	135	21st	6/9	161	19th	2/3	42	26th	2/5	56	29th
2017/18	18/22	804	3rd	7/8	313	2nd	5/7	237	5th	2/2	65	5th	4/5	189	4th

=== Overall record ===
Result	Individual	Sprint	Pursuit	Mass Start	Relay	Mixed Relay^{[a]}	Total		
Result	Individual	Sprint	Pursuit	Mass Start	Relay	Mixed Relay^{[a]}	Individual Events	Team Events	All Events
1st place	–	–	–	–	–	–	–	–	0
2nd place	–	–	–	–	–	–	–	–	0
3rd place	–	–	–	–	–	–	–	–	0
Podiums	–	–	–	–	–	–	–	–	0
4–10	–	3	3	–	5	–	6	5	11
11–20	–	4	1	–	1	1	5	2	7
21–40	–	4	3	1	–	–	8	–	8
41–60	–	1	–	–	–	–	1	–	1
Others	–	–	–	–	–	–	–	–	0
DNF	–	–	1	1	–	–	2	–	2
DSQ	–	–	–	–	–	–	–	–	0
Starts	–	12	8	2	6	1	22	7	29

* Results in all IBU World Cup races, Olympics and World Championships. Statistics as of 16 December 2007.

== Record ==
=== Olympic Games ===
6 medals (4 gold, 1 silver, 1 bronze)

Event	Individual	Sprint	Pursuit	Mass start	Relay	Mixed relay^{[a]}
(Canada) 2010 Vancouver	Bronze	8th	15th	6th	7th	—N/a
(Russia) 2014 Sochi	Gold	9th	Gold	Gold	4th	–
(South Korea) 2018 Pyeongchang	27th	9th	37th	Silver	Gold	5th

=== World Championships ===
7 medals (2 gold, 4 silver, 1 bronze)

Event	Individual	Sprint	Pursuit	Mass start	Relay	Mixed relay
(Italy) 2007 Antholz-Anterselva	–	13th	22nd	DNF	5th	13th
(Sweden) 2008 Östersund	–	46th	25th	–	5th	Silver
(South Korea) 2009 Pyeongchang	11th	53rd	5th	6th	4th	9th
(Russia) 2010 Khanty-Mansiysk	Not held in an Olympic season					9th
(Russia) 2011 Khanty-Mansiysk	19th	26th	35th	Silver	Bronze	10th
(Germany) 2012 Ruhpolding	25th	Silver	Gold	5th	4th	6th
(Czech Republic) 2013 Nové Město	33rd	43rd	25th	Gold	7th	11th
(Finland) 2015 Kontiolahti	16th	25th	7th	4th	7th	4th
(Norway) 2016 Oslo	–	–	–	–	–	–
(Austria) 2017 Hochfilzen	13th	27th	Silver	19th	9th	–

=== Individual victories ===
34 victories (9 Sp, 11 Pu, 4 In, 10 MS)

No.	Season	Date	Location	Discipline	Level
1	2009/10	13 March 2010	Kontiolahti, Finland	7.5 km Sprint	World Cup
2	2009/10	14 March 2010	Kontiolahti, Finland	10 km Pursuit	World Cup
3	2010/11	20 March 2011	Oslo Holmenkollen, Norway	12.5 km Mass Start	World Cup
4	2011/12	1 December 2011	Östersund, Sweden	15 km Individual	World Cup
5	2011/12	10 December 2011	Hochfilzen, Austria	10 km Pursuit	World Cup
6	2011/12	22 January 2012	Antholz, Italy	12.5 km Mass Start	World Cup
7	2011/12	4 March 2012	Ruhpolding, Germany	10 km Pursuit	World Championships
8	2011/12	17 March 2012	Khanty-Mansiysk, Russia	10 km Pursuit	World Cup
9	2011/12	18 March 2012	Khanty-Mansiysk, Russia	12.5 km Mass Start	World Cup
10	2012/13	7 December 2012	Hochfilzen, Austria	7.5 km Sprint	World Cup
11	2012/13	17 February 2013	Nové Město, Czech Republic	12.5 km Mass Start	World Championships
12	2012/13	7 March 2013	Sochi, Russia	15 km Individual	World Cup
13	2013/14	3 January 2014	Oberhof, Germany	7.5 km Sprint	World Cup
14	2013/14	4 January 2014	Oberhof, Germany	10 km Pursuit	World Cup
15	2013/14	11 February 2014	Sochi, Russia	10 km Pursuit	Winter Olympic Games
16	2013/14	14 February 2014	Sochi, Russia	15 km Individual	Winter Olympic Games
17	2013/14	17 February 2014	Sochi, Russia	12.5 km Mass Start	Winter Olympic Games
18	2013/14	9 March 2014	Pokljuka, Slovenia	12.5 km Mass Start	World Cup
19	2013/14	20 March 2014	Oslo Holmenkollen, Norway	7.5 km Sprint	World Cup
20	2014/15	4 December 2014	Östersund, Sweden	15 km Individual	World Cup
21	2014/15	20 December 2014	Pokljuka, Slovenia	10 km Pursuit	World Cup
22	2014/15	11 January 2015	Oberhof, Germany	12.5 km Mass Start	World Cup
23	2014/15	18 January 2015	Ruhpolding, Germany	12.5 km Mass Start	World Cup
24	2014/15	23 January 2015	Antholz, Italy	7.5 km Sprint	World Cup
25	2014/15	24 January 2015	Antholz, Italy	10 km Pursuit	World Cup
26	2014/15	8 February 2015	Nové Město, Czech Republic	10 km Pursuit	World Cup
27	2014/15	14 February 2015	Oslo Holmenkollen, Norway	7.5 km Sprint	World Cup
28	2014/15	21 March 2015	Khanty-Mansiysk, Russia	10 km Pursuit	World Cup
29	2017/18	8 December 2017	Hochfilzen, Austria	7.5 km Sprint	World Cup
30	2017/18	21 January 2018	Antholz, Italy	12.5 km Mass Start	World Cup
31	2017/18	9 March 2018	Kontiolahti, Finland	7.5 km Sprint	World Cup
32	2017/18	18 March 2018	Oslo Holmenkollen, Norway	10 km Pursuit	World Cup
33	2017/18	23 March 2018	Tyumen, Russia	7.5 km Sprint	World Cup
34	2017/18	25 March 2018	Tyumen, Russia	12.5 km Mass Start	World Cup

* Results are from UIPMB and IBU races which include the Biathlon World Cup, Biathlon World Championships and the Winter Olympic Games.

== Personal life ==
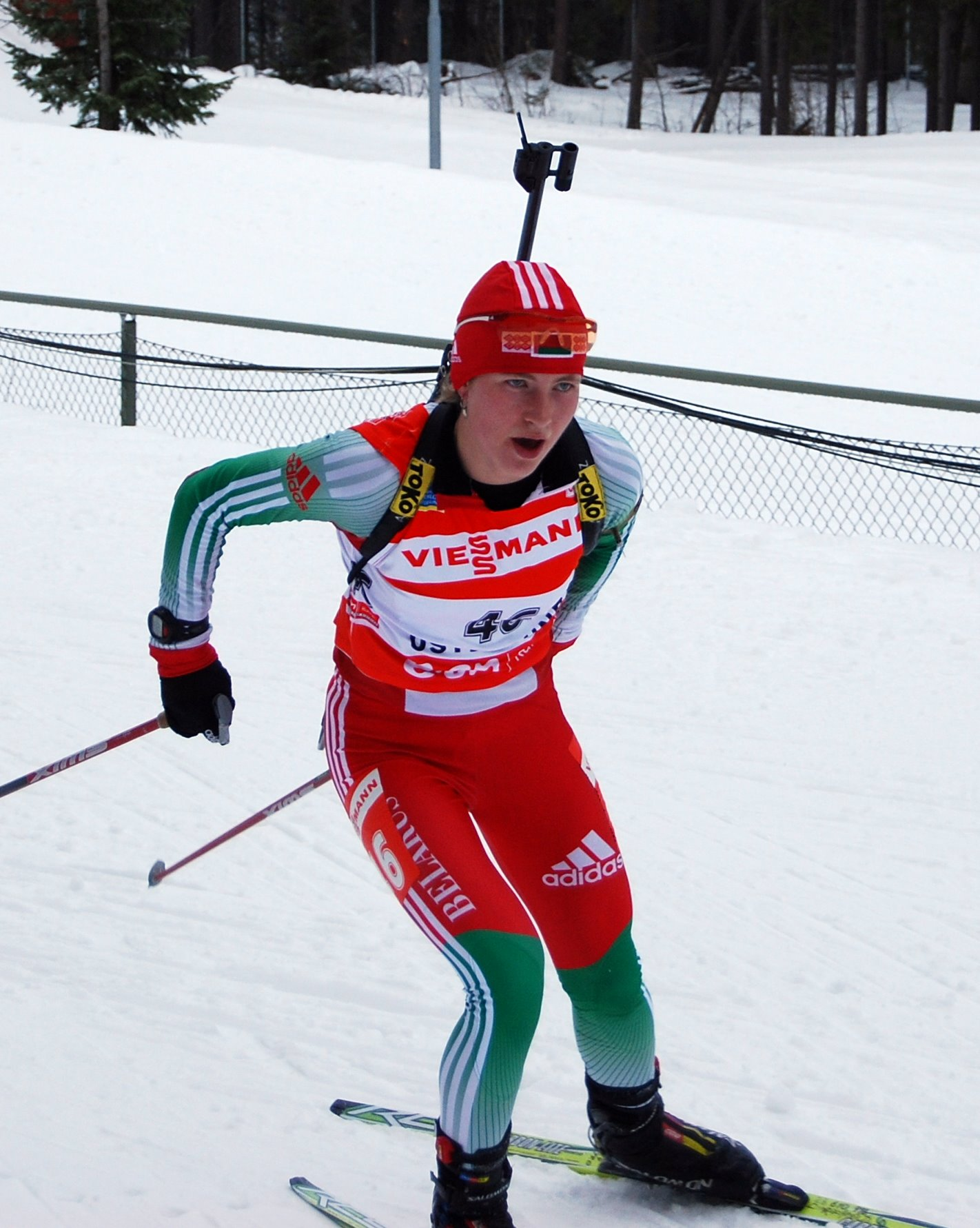
Domracheva at the World Championships in Östersund 2008

Domracheva was born in Minsk. When she was four, her parents, who are architects, moved to the small town of Nyagan in Siberia. Domracheva started skiing when she was six. In cross-country ski races she was competing with boys, as she had no rivals among girls. A biathlon school was opened in Nyagan in 1999, which Domracheva attended.

Domracheva's family moved back to Minsk in 2003. There was no faculty of Sports Management in Minsk, so Domracheva changed to studying Tourism Management at the Belarusian State Economic University. In 2009, she was writing her diploma thesis on the subject: Advertising in the tourism industry. Until 2014, Domracheva was an employee of the Belarusian branch of security agency KGB, one of the few to have retained its name from the Soviet Union era.

On 5 April 2016, Norwegian biathlete Ole Einar Bjørndalen confirmed that he and Domracheva are in a relationship and that Domracheva would give birth to their first child in October 2016. They were married 16 July 2016. Domracheva gave birth to a daughter, Xenia, on 1 October 2016. She retired from competitions in June 2018 to focus on raising her daughter. She and Bjoerndalen welcomed a second daughter in 2023.

During the 2020 Belarusian protests, Domracheva called on riot police to stop using violence against protesters and to resolve conflict through peaceful means.

== Film ==
Domracheva used a video camera to document herself, her teammates and athletes from other countries from 2008 until after the 2010 Winter Olympics in Vancouver. The 500 hours of material was edited into a 50-minute movie. The movie gives a unique insight into the life of world class athletes during the whole year, from the few weeks of relaxation and rest in the spring, through the hard training during the summer and the fall, to the competition season between December and March. The movie shows athletes from many countries, living together, traveling together and competing together.
