= Jenny Jonsson =

Swedish snowboarder

Personal information
- Nationality: Swedish
- Born: 25 June 1977 (age 47); Borlänge, Sweden

Sport
- Country: Sweden
- Sport: Snowboarding

Jenny Jonsson (born 25 June 1977) is a Swedish snowboarder.

She was born in Borlänge. She competed at the 1998 Winter Olympics, in halfpipe.
