= Biathlon World Championships 2012 – Women's relay =

Women's relay at the Biathlon World Championships 2012
- Date: 10 March 2012
- Competitors: 104 from 26 nations
- Winning time: 1:09:33.0

Medalists
gold medal	Tina Bachmann; Magdalena Neuner; Miriam Gössner; Andrea Henkel	Germany
silver medal	Marie-Laure Brunet; Sophie Boilley; Anaïs Bescond; Marie Dorin	France
bronze medal	Fanny Welle-Strand Horn; Elise Ringen; Synnøve Solemdal; Tora Berger	Norway

The women's relay competition of the Biathlon World Championships 2012 was held on March 10, 2012 at 15:15 local time.

== Results ==
The race was started at 15:15.

Rank	Bib	Team	Time	Penalties (P+S)	Deficit
1st place, gold medalist(s)	5	Germany; Tina Bachmann; Magdalena Neuner; Miriam Gössner; Andrea Henkel	1:09:33.0; 17:09.6; 17:28.4; 17:37.8; 17:17.2	0+6 1+4; 0+1 0+0; 0+3 1+3; 0+2 0+1; 0+0 0+0	
2nd place, silver medalist(s)	1	France; Marie-Laure Brunet; Sophie Boilley; Anaïs Bescond; Marie Dorin	1:10:01.5; 17:09.0; 17:19.7; 18:04.6; 17:28.2	0+4 0+3; 0+1 0+0; 0+1 0+0; 0+1 0+2; 0+1 0+1	+28.5
3rd place, bronze medalist(s)	2	Norway; Fanny Welle-Strand Horn; Elise Ringen; Synnøve Solemdal; Tora Berger	1:10:12.5; 18:12.0; 17:28.4; 17:39.2; 16:52.9	0+4 0+8; 0+1 0+3; 0+1 0+2; 0+1 0+3; 0+1 0+0	+39.5
4	4	Belarus; Nadezhda Skardino; Liudmila Kalinchik; Nastassia Dubarezava; Darya Domracheva	1:10:14.2; 18:08.2; 17:41.9; 18:05.1; 16:19.0	0+1 0+5; 0+0 0+2; 0+0 0+0; 0+1 0+3; 0+0 0+0	+41.2
5	9	Sweden; Jenny Jonsson; Anna Maria Nilsson; Anna Karin Strömstedt; Helena Ekholm	1:10:38.2; 18:12.8; 17:36.5; 17:43.2; 17:05.7	0+3 0+2; 0+0 0+0; 0+1 0+1; 0+1 0+1; 0+1 0+0	+1:05.2
6	7	Ukraine; Natalya Burdyga; Valj Semerenko; Vita Semerenko; Olena Pidhrushna	1:10:53.5; 18:22.7; 17:18.0; 17:08.1; 18:04.7	0+3 0+5; 0+1 0+3; 0+0 0+2; 0+0 0+0; 0+2 0+0	+1:20.5
7	3	Russia; Svetlana Sleptsova; Olga Zaitseva; Anna Bogaliy-Titovets; Olga Vilukhina	1:11:07.0; 17:33.8; 17:47.2; 18:17.1; 17:28.9	0+5 0+6; 0+2 0+1; 0+1 0+1; 0+0 0+3; 0+2 0+1	+1:34.0
8	10	Slovakia; Jana Gereková; Anastasiya Kuzmina; Martina Chrapánová; Paulina Fialkova	1:12:44.1; 17:15.4; 17:12.2; 18:43.9; 19:32.6	0+0 1+6; 0+0 0+0; 0+0 0+2; 0+0 0+1; 0+0 1+3	+3:11.1
9	6	Poland; Krystyna Pałka; Weronika Nowakowska-Ziemniak; Magdalena Gwizdoń; Agnieszka Cyl	1:13:19.7; 18:08.2; 17:57.0; 18:56.4; 18:18.1	0+4 1+8; 0+1 0+1; 0+1 0+2; 0+0 1+3; 0+2 0+2	+3:46.7
10	11	Czech Republic; Veronika Vítková; Barbora Tomešová; Veronika Zvařičová; Jitka Landová	1:13:23.8; 17:30.7; 18:14.4; 18:24.4; 19:14.3	0+4 0+8; 0+1 0+2; 0+2 0+3; 0+1 0+2; 0+0 0+1	+3:50.8
11	14	United States; Sara Studebaker; Susan Dunklee; Annelies Cook; Lanny Barnes	1:13:33.1; 18:12.6; 18:19.7; 18:29.1; 18:31.7	0+4 0+5; 0+2 0+1; 0+2 0+3; 0+0 0+1; 0+0 0+0	+4:00.1
12	8	Italy; Dorothea Wierer; Alexia Runggaldier; Nicole Gontier; Katja Haller	1:13:52.3; 17:49.6; 18:12.3; 18:39.7; 19:10.7	0+7 0+3; 0+2 0+0; 0+1 0+1; 0+2 0+2; 0+2 0+0	+4:19.3
13	13	Canada; Megan Imrie; Megan Heinicke; Yolaine Oddou; Zina Kocher	1:14:33.9; 17:48.9; 18:23.3; 20:10.5; 18:11.2	1+6 0+4; 0+2 0+0; 0+1 0+3; 1+3 0+0; 0+0 0+1	+5:00.9
14	16	Estonia; Kadri Lehtla; Kristel Viigipuu; Grete Gaim; Eveli Saue	1:15:06.7; 17:51.2; 19:00.1; 19:30.2; 18:45.2	0+4 0+3; 0+2 0+0; 0+0 0+2; 0+2 0+0; 0+0 0+1	+5:33.7
15	17	Japan; Fuyuko Suzuki; Itsuka Owada; Yuki Nakajima; Naoko Azegami	LAP; 17:54.0; 19:07.0; 18:34.5	1+5 1+3; 0+0 0+0; 1+3 0+0; 0+0 0+0; 0+2 1+3	
16	19	Austria; Romana Schrempf; Iris Waldhuber; Ramona Düringer; Katharina Innerhofer	LAP; 19:17.9; 18:22.2; 19:44.3	0+8 1+7; 0+3 1+3; 0+0 0+0; 0+3 0+3; 0+2 0+1	
17	12	Bulgaria; Emilia Yordanova; Nina Klenovska; Desislava Stoyanova; Niya Dimitrova	LAP; 19:27.2; 18:45.8; 18:57.0	1+5 0+3; 1+3 0+0; 0+1 0+2; 0+0 0+0; 0+1 0+1	
18	18	Finland; Mari Laukkanen; Kaisa Mäkäräinen; Eevamari Oksanen; Sanna Markkanen	LAP; 19:35.5; 17:11.9; 20:25.5	0+5 3+9; 0+1 3+3; 0+0 0+1; 0+2 0+3; 0+2 0+2	
19	21	Kazakhstan; Marina Lebedeva; Olga Poltoranina; Darya Usanova; Elena Khrustaleva	LAP; 18:47.6; 18:39.4; 19:57.3	0+5 2+6; 0+1 0+2; 0+1 0+0; 0+3 2+3; 0+0 0+1	
20	15	Romania; Éva Tófalvi; Réka Ferencz; Luminita Piscoran; Florina Ioana Cirstea	LAP; 19:27.6; 18:43.7; 18:52.6	1+5 0+7; 1+3 0+2; 0+0 0+1; 0+1 0+2; 0+1 0+2	
21	25	Switzerland; Elisa Gasparin; Selina Gasparin; Irene Cadurisch; Patricia Jost	LAP; 18:52.4; 18:10.8; 21:37.7	2+4 0+8; 0+0 0+2; 0+1 0+3; 2+3 0+2; 0+0 0+1	
22	24	Great Britain; Amanda Lightfoot; Nerys Jones; Adele Walker; Fay Potton	LAP; 18:13.2; 19:59.9; 19:18.0	0+5 1+8; 0+1 0+1; 0+3 0+2; 0+0 0+2; 0+1 1+3	
23	23	Lithuania; Diana Rasimovičiūtė; Natalija Kočergina; Aliona Sabaliauskiene; Marija Kaznacenko	LAP; 18:44.5; 19:51.6; 21:11.1	1+7 1+8; 1+3 0+1; 0+3 1+3; 0+1 0+1; 0+0 0+3	
24	22	South Korea; Kim Seon-su; Kim Seo-ra; Kim Kyung-nam; Mun Ji-hee	LAP; 19:57.4; 19:31.1; 20:43.4	0+4 0+6; 0+1 0+2; 0+0 0+1; 0+1 0+2; 0+2 0+1	
25	20	China; Song Chaoqing; Wang Chunli; Tang Jialin; Zhang Yan	LAP; 21:32.5; 19:34.7; 19:57.6	1+4 0+3; 1+3 0+0; 0+0 0+0; 0+1 0+2; 0+0 0+1	
26	26	Latvia; Žanna Juškāne; Inga Paskovska; Baiba Bendika; Anete Brice	LAP; 19:37.1; 21:28.1; 20:42.7	0+4 1+8; 0+2 0+2; 0+0 1+3; 0+2 0+1; 0+0 0+2	
