= Biathlon World Championships 2015 – Women's sprint =

Women's sprint at the Biathlon World Championships 2015
- Venue: Kontiolahti, Finland
- Date: 7 March 2015
- Competitors: 105 from 32 nations
- Winning time: 22:16.8

Medalists
gold medal	Marie Dorin Habert	France
silver medal	Weronika Nowakowska-Ziemniak	Poland
bronze medal	Valj Semerenko	Ukraine

The Women's sprint event of the Biathlon World Championships 2015 was held on 7 March 2015.

== Results ==
The race was started at 17:30 EET.

Rank	Bib	Name	Nationality	Time	Penalties (P+S)	Deficit
1st place, gold medalist(s)	16	Marie Dorin Habert	France	22:16.8	1 (0+1)	
2nd place, silver medalist(s)	19	Weronika Nowakowska-Ziemniak	Poland	22:26.4	0 (0+0)	+9.6
3rd place, bronze medalist(s)	4	Valj Semerenko	Ukraine	22:36.5	1 (0+1)	+19.7
4	32	Laura Dahlmeier	Germany	22:45.9	3 (1+2)	+29.1
5	35	Krystyna Guzik	Poland	22:56.5	1 (0+1)	+39.7
6	40	Ekaterina Shumilova	Russia	23:05.6	2 (1+1)	+48.8
7	44	Magdalena Gwizdoń	Poland	23:08.6	2 (2+0)	+51.8
8	53	Andreja Mali	Slovenia	23:18.7	1 (1+0)	+1:01.9
9	37	Olga Abramova	Ukraine	23:19.8	2 (1+1)	+1:03.0
10	17	Franziska Hildebrand	Germany	23:26.6	2 (1+1)	+1:09.8
11	52	Nastassia Dubarezava	Belarus	23:27.4	2 (1+1)	+1:10.6
12	2	Jana Gereková	Slovakia	23:28.1	2 (0+2)	+1:11.3
13	12	Elisa Gasparin	Switzerland	23:30.0	1 (0+1)	+1:13.2
14	25	Franziska Preuß	Germany	23:35.9	3 (0+3)	+1:19.1
15	27	Veronika Vítková	Czech Republic	23:39.3	4 (2+2)	+1:22.5
16	22	Mari Laukkanen	Finland	23:40.0	2 (0+2)	+1:23.2
17	48	Dunja Zdouc	Austria	23:55.6	2 (1+1)	+1:38.8
18	9	Gabriela Soukalová	Czech Republic	23:57.1	3 (0+3)	+1:40.3
19	3	Tiril Eckhoff	Norway	23:59.3	3 (0+3)	+1:42.5
20	28	Dorothea Wierer	Italy	24:02.5	3 (1+2)	+1:45.7
21	23	Daria Virolaynen	Russia	24:07.1	3 (0+3)	+1:50.3
22	13	Fuyuko Suzuki	Japan	24:08.4	2 (1+1)	+1:51.6
23	20	Megan Heinicke	Canada	24:12.1	1 (1+0)	+1:55.3
24	26	Lisa Hauser	Austria	24:12.9	1 (0+1)	+1:45.1
25	10	Darya Domracheva	Belarus	24:14.9	5 (1+4)	+1:58.1
26	49	Katharina Innerhofer	Austria	24:19.2	3 (2+1)	+2:02.4
27	59	Lena Häcki	Switzerland	24:20.2	4 (2+2)	+2:03.4
28	47	Mona Brorsson	Sweden	24:24.5	2 (1+1)	+2:07.7
29	1	Karin Oberhofer	Italy	24:27.8	4 (2+2)	+2:11.0
30	38	Marte Olsbu	Norway	24:28.5	3 (0+3)	+2:11.7
31	5	Rosanna Crawford	Canada	24:30.1	3 (0+3)	+2:13.3
32	76	Emilia Yordanova	Bulgaria	24:33.0	2 (2+0)	+2:16.2
33	42	Justine Braisaz	France	24:36.6	5 (4+1)	+2:19.8
34	6	Kaisa Mäkäräinen	Finland	24:37.5	5 (3+2)	+2:20.7
35	50	Iana Bondar	Ukraine	24:41.6	6 (3+3)	+2:24.8
36	18	Iryna Varvynets	Ukraine	24:43.9	3 (1+2)	+2:27.1
37	45	Desislava Stoyanova	Bulgaria	24:45.5	3 (2+1)	+2:28.7
38	66	Johanna Talihaerm	Estonia	24:45.6	3 (3+0)	+2:28.8
39	70	Clare Egan	United States	24:47.2	4 (2+2)	+2:30.4
40	100	Wang Yue	China	24:49.5	2 (0+2)	+2:32.7
41	15	Susan Dunklee	United States	24:52.0	3 (1+2)	+2:35.2
42	62	Kadri Lehtla	Estonia	24:52.3	4 (2+2)	+2:35.5
43	101	Miki Kobayashi	Japan	24:55.4	3 (1+2)	+2:38.6
44	29	Olga Podchufarova	Russia	24:56.3	3 (1+2)	+2:39.5
45	63	Luminița Pișcoran	Romania	24:57.7	4 (2+2)	+2:40.9
46	82	Anna Kistanova	Kazakhstan	25:00.4	3 (1+2)	+2:43.6
47	68	Amanda Lightfoot	Great Britain	25:00.6	4 (2+2)	+2:43.8
48	30	Vanessa Hinz	Germany	25:01.8	4 (1+3)	+2:45.0
49	34	Nadzeya Pisarava	Belarus	25:02.8	4 (1+3)	+2:46.0
50	51	Elisabeth Högberg	Sweden	25:04.8	3 (2+1)	+2:48.0
51	87	Julia Ransom	Canada	25:08.5	3 (0+3)	+2:51.7
52	41	Coline Varcin	France	25:12.6	4 (3+1)	+2:55.8
53	31	Elise Ringen	Norway	25:13.6	4 (2+2)	+2:56.8
54	65	Mun Ji-hee	South Korea	25:14.9	3 (2+1)	+2:58.1
55	24	Anaïs Bescond	France	25:20.8	5 (1+4)	+3:04.0
56	61	Terézia Poliaková	Slovakia	25:21.9	4 (1+3)	+3:05.1
57	69	Song Chaoqing	China	25:24.0	5 (3+2)	+3:07.2
58	74	Martina Chrapánová	Slovakia	25:24.5	5 (4+1)	+3:07.7
59	55	Lisa Vittozzi	Italy	25:26.0	4 (1+3)	+3:09.2
60	56	Hannah Dreissigacker	United States	25:30.1	6 (4+2)	+3:13.3
61	75	Diana Rasimovičiūtė-Brice	Lithuania	25:34.4	5 (0+5)	+3:17.6
62	88	Zhang Yan	China	25:36.7	5 (2+3)	+3:19.9
63	89	Flurina Volken	Switzerland	25:39.8	5 (3+2)	+3:23.0
64	94	Emőke Szőcs	Hungary	25:39.8	3 (2+1)	+3:23.0
64	39	Jitka Landová	Czech Republic	25:44.3	6 (2+4)	+3:27.5
66	33	Nicole Gontier	Italy	25:45.0	5 (1+4)	+3:28.2
67	43	Annelies Cook	United States	25:45.3	5 (2+3)	+3:28.5
68	93	Sanna Markkanen	Finland	25:47.3	3 (1+2)	+3:30.5
69	14	Nadezhda Skardino	Belarus	25:54.3	4 (2+2)	+3:37.5
70	11	Éva Tófalvi	Romania	25:54.4	5 (2+3)	+3:37.6
71	54	Tang Jialin	China	25:57.6	4 (1+3)	+3:40.8
72	106	Auli Kiskola	Finland	25:59.3	5 (3+2)	+3:42.5
73	36	Eva Puskarčíková	Czech Republic	26:01.7	5 (0+5)	+3:44.9
74	7	Monika Hojnisz	Poland	26:06.2	6 (2+4)	+3:49.4
75	104	Olga Poltoranina	Kazakhstan	26:09.3	4 (2+2)	+3:52.5
76	46	Audrey Vaillancourt	Canada	26:10.9	5 (2+3)	+3:54.0
77	81	Urška Poje	Slovenia	26:11.1	4 (1+3)	+3:54.3
78	21	Fanny Welle-Strand Horn	Norway	26:16.4	7 (5+2)	+3:59.6
79	84	Daria Yurlova	Estonia	26:18.9	4 (1+3)	+4:02.1
80	57	Aita Gasparin	Switzerland	26:19.5	5 (0+5)	+4:02.7
81	58	Darya Usanova	Kazakhstan	26:21.4	6 (2+4)	+4:04.6
82	67	Baiba Bendika	Latvia	26:27.1	3 (2+1)	+4:10.3
83	95	Emma Nilsson	Sweden	26:31.9	6 (3+3)	+4:15.1
84	79	Anja Eržen	Slovenia	26:48.0	7 (4+3)	+4:31.2
85	97	Kristel Viigipuu	Estonia	26:57.9	4 (3+1)	+4:41.1
86	64	Daniela Kadeva	Bulgaria	27:05.9	2 (1+1)	+4:49.1
87	102	Gabrielė Leščinskaitė	Lithuania	27:09.0	6 (2+4)	+4:52.2
88	60	Paulína Fialková	Slovakia	27:15.3	9 (5+4)	+4:58.5
89	90	Réka Ferencz	Romania	27:20.1	6 (2+4)	+5:03.3
90	103	Nerys Jones	Great Britain	27:24.6	5 (3+2)	+5:07.8
91	73	Florina Ioana Cîrstea	Romania	27:25.4	5 (3+2)	+5:08.6
92	91	Natalija Paulauskaitė	Lithuania	27:32.4	5 (2+3)	+5:15.6
93	77	Alina Raikova	Kazakhstan	27:36.7	6 (2+4)	+5:19.9
94	78	Julia Schwaiger	Austria	27:41.3	6 (2+4)	+5:24.5
95	92	Yurie Tanaka	Japan	27:43.2	7 (3+4)	+5:26.4
96	105	Marija Kaznacenko	Lithuania	27:51.9	5 (3+2)	+5:35.1
97	80	Victoria Padial	Spain	27:58.0	5 (0+5)	+5:41.2
98	99	Kim Seon-su	South Korea	28:17.0	6 (3+3)	+6:00.2
99	96	Park Ji-ae	South Korea	28:22.5	4 (3+1)	+6:05.7
100	71	Ko Eun-jung	South Korea	29:29.5	8 (3+5)	+7:12.7
101	86	Katsura Sato	Japan	29:40.1	9 (5+4)	+7:23.3
102	98	Stefani Popova	Bulgaria	29:42.3	7 (4+3)	+7:25.5
	72	Chardine Sloof	Netherlands	DNF	3 (2+1)	
	83	Alexandra Camenșcic	Moldova	DNF		
	85	Ingela Andersson	Sweden	DNS		
DSQ	8	Ekaterina Glazyrina	Russia	24:18.5	2 (0+2)	+2:01.7
