= Biathlon World Championships 2013 – Women's individual =

Women's individual at the Biathlon World Championships 2013
- Date: 13 February 2013
- Competitors: 118 from 38 nations
- Winning time: 44:52.5

Medalists
gold medal	Tora Berger	Norway
silver medal	Andrea Henkel	Germany
bronze medal	Valj Semerenko	Ukraine

The Women's individual event of the Biathlon World Championships 2013 was held on February 13, 2013. 118 athletes participated over a course of 15 km.

== Results ==
The race was started at 17:15.

Rank	Bib	Name	Nationality	Time	Penalties (P+S+P+S)	Deficit
1st place, gold medalist(s)	62	Tora Berger	Norway	44:52.5	0 (0+0+0+0)	
2nd place, silver medalist(s)	71	Andrea Henkel	Germany	45:45.2	0 (0+0+0+0)	+52.7
3rd place, bronze medalist(s)	3	Valj Semerenko	Ukraine	46:35.0	1 (1+0+0+0)	+1:42.5
4	69	Anastasiya Kuzmina	Slovakia	46:47.5	2 (0+0+1+1)	+1:55.0
5	58	Vita Semerenko	Ukraine	47:18.4	1 (0+0+0+1)	+2:25.9
6	35	Olga Zaitseva	Russia	47:23.4	2 (2+0+0+0)	+2:30.9
7	31	Ekaterina Glazyrina	Russia	47:33.0	1 (0+0+1+0)	+2:40.5
8	13	Kaisa Mäkäräinen	Finland	47:38.3	3 (2+0+0+1)	+2:45.8
9	38	Marie Dorin Habert	France	47:43.7	2 (0+1+1+0)	+2:51.2
10	41	Olga Vilukhina	Russia	47:56.1	1 (0+1+0+0)	+3:03.6
11	43	Olena Pidhrushna	Ukraine	48:00.7	2 (1+1+0+0)	+3:08.2
12	47	Gabriela Soukalová	Czech Republic	48:11.6	2 (0+0+1+1)	+3:19.1
13	92	Juliya Dzyhma	Ukraine	48:17.8	1 (0+0+1+0)	+3:25.3
14	93	Veronika Vítková	Czech Republic	48:22.5	1 (0+0+0+1)	+3:30.0
15	53	Susan Dunklee	United States	48:22.8	2 (1+0+1+0)	+3:30.3
16	39	Zhang Yan	China	48:36.1	1 (0+1+0+0)	+3:43.6
17	15	Rosanna Crawford	Canada	48:45.8	1 (0+1+0+0)	+3:53.3
18	42	Magdalena Gwizdoń	Poland	48:50.9	3 (0+1+0+2)	+3:58.4
19	60	Marie-Laure Brunet	France	48:57.6	0 (0+0+0+0)	+4:05.1
20	37	Selina Gasparin	Switzerland	49:09.6	3 (0+1+0+2)	+4:17.1
21	33	Elisabeth Högberg	Sweden	49:21.4	1 (0+1+0+0)	+4:28.9
22	78	Krystyna Pałka	Poland	49:24.1	3 (0+1+0+2)	+4:31.6
23	106	Weronika Nowakowska-Ziemniak	Poland	49:24.4	3 (0+2+1+0)	+4:31.9
24	45	Iris Schwalb	Austria	49:28.8	1 (0+0+0+1)	+4:36.3
25	44	Teja Gregorin	Slovenia	49:38.5	3 (1+1+0+1)	+4:46.0
26	73	Nadezhda Skardino	Belarus	49:44.0	2 (1+0+1+0)	+4:51.5
27	30	Sara Studebaker	United States	49:44.7	1 (0+0+0+1)	+4:52.2
28	89	Nadine Horchler	Germany	49:45.9	1 (0+0+1+0)	+4:53.4
29	51	Karin Oberhofer	Italy	49:47.8	3 (1+0+1+1)	+4:55.3
30	77	Tang Jialin	China	49:54.1	2 (1+1+0+0)	+5:01.6
31	96	Liudmila Kalinchik	Belarus	50:22.8	3 (1+1+1+0)	+5:30.3
32	52	Ekaterina Yurlova	Russia	50:26.7	3 (0+2+0+1)	+5:34.2
33	56	Darya Domracheva	Belarus	50:27.8	6 (4+0+1+1)	+5:35.3
34	85	Elisa Gasparin	Switzerland	50:31.6	1 (0+0+0+1)	+5:39.1
35	50	Miriam Gössner	Germany	50:35.5	6 (1+1+1+3)	+5:43.0
36	75	Andreja Mali	Slovenia	50:36.2	2 (0+2+0+0)	+5:43.7
37	25	Niya Dimitrova	Bulgaria	50:52.1	1 (0+0+1+0)	+5:59.6
38	94	Annelies Cook	United States	50:54.1	4 (0+3+0+1)	+6:01.6
39	36	Laure Soulie	Andorra	50:55.7	2 (0+0+0+2)	+6:03.2
40	55	Barbora Tomešová	Czech Republic	51:03.1	2 (0+1+0+1)	+6:10.6
41	95	Michela Ponza	Italy	51:05.1	2 (0+0+0+2)	+6:12.6
42	59	Kadri Lehtla	Estonia	51:06.1	2 (1+0+0+1)	+6:13.6
43	66	Éva Tófalvi	Romania	51:06.4	3 (0+2+1+0)	+6:13.9
44	20	Ann Kristin Flatland	Norway	51:08.2	3 (0+1+1+1)	+6:15.7
45	4	Sophie Boilley	France	51:19.9	3 (1+1+1+0)	+6:27.4
46	34	Alina Raikova	Kazakhstan	51:28.0	3 (1+1+0+1)	+6:35.5
47	116	Terézia Poliaková	Slovakia	51:33.8	3 (0+1+0+2)	+6:41.3
48	99	Anaïs Bescond	France	52:12.4	5 (0+1+1+3)	+7:19.9
49	28	Agnieszka Cyl	Poland	52:26.2	6 (2+2+1+1)	+7:33.7
50	83	Megan Heinicke	Canada	52:30.6	4 (2+0+2+0)	+7:38.1
51	29	Franziska Hildebrand	Germany	52:31.7	5 (0+3+0+2)	+7:39.2
52	67	Zina Kocher	Canada	52:35.5	6 (1+2+2+1)	+7:43.0
53	48	Synnøve Solemdal	Norway	52:49.0	6 (2+1+1+2)	+7:56.5
54	82	Fanny Welle-Strand Horn	Norway	52:52.9	5 (0+0+3+2)	+8:00.4
55	68	Elin Mattsson	Sweden	52:53.6	5 (0+4+0+1)	+8:01.1
56	118	Hannah Dreissigacker	United States	53:00.7	5 (1+1+1+2)	+8:08.2
57	114	Daria Yurlova	Estonia	53:12.0	2 (0+1+0+1)	+8:19.5
58	9	Dorothea Wierer	Italy	53:15.3	5 (3+2+0+0)	+8:22.8
59	10	Réka Ferencz	Romania	53:27.6	3 (1+0+2+0)	+8:35.1
60	76	Emilia Yordanova	Bulgaria	53:30.8	3 (1+0+1+1)	+8:38.3
61	8	Jitka Landová	Czech Republic	53:32.3	5 (0+4+0+1)	+8:39.8
62	81	Jana Gereková	Slovakia	53:39.6	6 (2+1+1+2)	+8:47.1
63	49	Mari Laukkanen	Finland	53:42.9	6 (2+1+1+2)	+8:50.4
64	86	Katharina Innerhofer	Austria	53:45.3	4 (2+1+1+0)	+8:52.8
65	23	Patricia Jost	Switzerland	53:49.0	3 (0+1+0+2)	+8:56.5
66	24	Martina Chrapánová	Slovakia	53:56.9	6 (1+1+1+3)	+9:04.4
67	19	Jo In-Hee	South Korea	53:57.0	2 (0+1+0+1)	+9:04.5
68	88	Ingela Andersson	Sweden	54:02.9	3 (0+2+0+1)	+9:10.4
69	64	Darya Usanova	Kazakhstan	54:04.6	5 (1+2+2+0)	+9:12.1
70	57	Diana Rasimovičiūtė	Lithuania	54:08.2	8 (1+3+0+4)	+9:15.7
71	40	Fuyuko Suzuki	Japan	54:10.8	4 (1+2+1+0)	+9:18.3
72	2	Victoria Padial Hernández	Spain	54:11.1	7 (1+5+1+0)	+9:32.1
73	17	Romana Schrempf	Austria	54:24.6	7 (1+5+1+0)	+9:32.1
74	109	Marina Lebedeva	Kazakhstan	54:34.4	5 (3+0+1+1)	+9:41.9
75	80	Elena Khrustaleva	Kazakhstan	54:42.6	5 (1+2+2+0)	+9:50.1
76	108	Audrey Vaillancourt	Canada	54:46.0	4 (3+1+0+0)	+9:53.5
77	112	Hilde Fenne	Norway	54:49.8	8 (2+2+2+2)	+9:57.3
78	115	Alexia Runggaldier	Italy	54:55.8	6 (1+3+1+1)	+10:03.3
79	74	Kristel Viigipuu	Estonia	55:21.9	4 (2+0+0+2)	+10:29.4
80	103	Itsuka Owada	Japan	55:24.6	3 (0+2+0+1)	+10:32.1
81	91	Arisa Goshono	Japan	55:36.2	1 (0+1+0+0)	+10:43.7
82	87	Luminita Piscoran	Romania	55:37.2	7 (0+1+2+4)	+10:44.7
83	65	Kim Seon-Su	South Korea	55:41.8	4 (2+1+1+0)	+10:49.3
84	107	Aita Gasparin	Switzerland	55:52.4	4 (1+0+1+2)	+10:59.9
85	84	Nerys Jones	Great Britain	56:25.8	6 (3+0+2+1)	+11:33.3
86	61	Žanna Juškāne	Latvia	56:27.7	7 (2+2+0+3)	+11:35.2
87	21	Ma Wei	China	56:28.6	8 (1+3+2+2)	+11:36.1
88	12	Dijana Ravnikar	Slovenia	56:34.4	6 (1+1+4+0)	+11:41.9
89	72	Tanja Karišik	Bosnia and Herzegovina	56:35.7	5 (2+1+1+1)	+11:43.2
90	22	Yuki Nakajima	Japan	57:09.9	7 (1+3+3+0)	+12:17.4
91	100	Stefani Popova	Bulgaria	57:21.7	6 (2+1+2+1)	+12:29.2
92	70	Emőke Szőcs	Hungary	57:36.3	7 (0+2+1+4)	+12:43.8
93	18	Sarah Murphy	New Zealand	57:46.8	7 (1+1+3+2)	+12:54.3
94	98	Annukka Siltakorpi	Finland	57:52.7	5 (0+2+1+2)	+13:00.2
95	54	Amanda Lightfoot	Great Britain	57:55.8	7 (0+2+4+1)	+13:03.3
96	117	Adele Walker	Great Britain	58:01.4	6 (1+2+2+1)	+13:08.9
97	102	Ramona Düringer	Austria	58:11.4	7 (1+3+0+3)	+13:18.9
98	97	Baiba Bendika	Latvia	58:40.8	5 (1+1+2+1)	+13:48.3
99	7	Johanna Talihärm	Finland	58:50.5	8 (1+2+2+3)	+13:58.0
100	104	Lili Drčar	Slovenia	1:00:04.7	7 (1+2+2+2)	+15:12.2
101	16	Sanna Markkanen	Finland	1:00:09.3	9 (1+2+2+4)	+15:16.8
102	32	Jaqueline Mourão	Brazil	1:00:20.7	8 (1+2+0+5)	+15:28.2
103	6	Marija Kaznacenko	Lithuania	1:00:51.7	9 (2+2+3+2)	+15:59.2
104	111	Orsolya Tófalvi	Romania	1:01:31.7	7 (1+3+1+2)	+16:39.2
105	26	Panagiota Tsakiri	Greece	1:02:04.7	5 (1+1+0+3)	+17:12.21
106	63	Lucy Glanville	Australia	1:02:08.8	7 (2+3+1+1)	+17:16.3
107	113	Wang Yue	China	1:02:18.0	11 (1+3+4+3)	+17:25.5
108	46	Desislava Stoyanova	Bulgaria	1:02:52.3	13 (4+3+2+4)	+17:59.8
109	27	Alexandra Camenscic	Moldova	1:03:16.5	5 (1+1+1+2)	+18:24.0
110	79	Park Ji-Ae	South Korea	1:05:35.9	8 (2+2+2+2)	+20:43.4
111	105	Karolina Banel	Lithuania	1:06:31.4	9 (1+3+2+3)	+21:38.9
112	110	Kim Kyung-Nam	South Korea	1:07:24.8	11 (2+1+3+5)	+22:32.3
113	5	Nihan Erdiler	Turkey	1:09:16.8	7 (1+1+1+4)	+24:24.3
	1	Nastassia Dubarezava	Belarus	DNF	(3+1)	
	14	Chardine Sloof	Netherlands	DNF	(1)	
	90	Natalija Kočergina	Lithuania	DNF	(3+2)	
	101	Jenny Jonsson	Sweden	DNS		
	11	Inga Paskovska	Latvia	DNS		
