= Biathlon World Championships 2013 – Women's pursuit =

Women's pursuit at the Biathlon World Championships 2013
- Date: 10 February 2013
- Competitors: 60 from 24 nations
- Winning time: 28:48.4

Medalists
gold medal	Tora Berger	Norway
silver medal	Krystyna Pałka	Poland
bronze medal	Olena Pidhrushna	Ukraine

The Women's pursuit event of the Biathlon World Championships 2013 was held on February 10, 2013. The fastest 60 athletes of the sprint competition participated over a course of 10 km.

== Results ==
The race started at 16:15.

Rank	Bib	Name	Nationality	Start	Penalties (P+P+S+S)	Time	Deficit
1st place, gold medalist(s)	2	Tora Berger	Norway	0:06	3 (0+1+2+0)	28:48.4	
2nd place, silver medalist(s)	7	Krystyna Pałka	Poland	0:35	2 (0+0+1+1)	29:06.9	+18.5
3rd place, bronze medalist(s)	1	Olena Pidhrushna	Ukraine	0:00	2 (0+0+2+0)	29:09.9	+21.5
4	4	Olga Zaitseva	Russia	0:25	3 (0+1+1+1)	29:11.4	+23.0
5	27	Ekaterina Glazyrina	Russia	1:22	0 (0+0+0+0)	29:33.8	+45.4
6	33	Andrea Henkel	Germany	1:32	0 (0+0+0+0)	29:37.6	+49.2
7	8	Ann Kristin Flatland	Norway	0:36	1 (0+1+0+0)	29:56.7	+1:08.3
8	10	Veronika Vítková	Czech Republic	0:51	2 (0+0+1+1)	29:58.5	+1:10.1
9	3	Vita Semerenko	Ukraine	0:23	4 (2+1+0+1)	29:59.3	+1:10.9
10	9	Kaisa Mäkäräinen	Finland	0:41	4 (1+1+1+1)	30:03.9	+1:15.5
11	26	Marie-Laure Brunet	France	1:21	1 (0+1+0+0)	30:06.3	+1:17.9
12	12	Magdalena Gwizdoń	Poland	0:54	4 (2+1+1+0)	30:10.4	+1:22.0
13	24	Monika Hojnisz	Poland	1:17	1 (0+0+0+1)	30:11.1	+1:22.7
14	17	Anastasiya Kuzmina	Slovakia	1:05	4 (0+1+2+1)	30:13.7	+1:25.3
15	25	Nadezhda Skardino	Belarus	1:18	0 (0+0+0+0)	30:14.0	+1:25.6
16	18	Marie Dorin Habert	France	1:09	4 (3+0+0+1)	30:24.8	+1:36.4
17	13	Franziska Hildebrand	Germany	0:55	3 (1+1+1+0)	30:33.6	+1:45.2
18	11	Jana Gereková	Slovakia	0:51	4 (1+1+1+1)	30:36.8	+1:48.4
19	19	Synnøve Solemdal	Norway	1:09	3 (0+0+1+2)	30:39.0	+1:50.6
20	14	Gabriela Soukalová	Czech Republic	0:57	4 (1+2+1+0)	30:41.3	+1:52.9
21	6	Miriam Gössner	Germany	0:33	6 (3+1+1+1)	30:41.5	+1:53.1
22	5	Olga Vilukhina	Russia	0:25	4 (2+0+2+0)	30:53.1	+2:04.7
23	20	Anaïs Bescond	France	1:10	4 (1+0+3+0)	30:53.4	+2:05.0
24	32	Zhang Yan	China	1:31	1 (0+0+1+0)	31:01.4	+2:13.0
25	43	Darya Domracheva	Belarus	2:00	4 (1+1+1+1)	31:13.9	+2:25.5
26	29	Karin Oberhofer	Italy	1:28	4 (1+0+1+2)	31:14.5	+2:26.1
27	34	Weronika Nowakowska-Ziemniak	Poland	1:42	4 (0+2+0+2)	31:16.0	+2:27.6
28	16	Sophie Boilley	France	1:04	5 (2+0+1+2)	31:16.8	+2:28.4
29	15	Ekaterina Shumilova	Russia	1:02	4 (0+0+1+3)	31:17.0	+2:28.6
30	21	Dorothea Wierer	Italy	1:11	4 (2+1+1+0)	31:17.9	+2:29.5
31	38	Tang Jialin	China	1:45	2 (1+1+0+0)	31:30.1	+2:41.7
32	39	Teja Gregorin	Slovenia	1:51	2 (0+0+1+1)	31:36.0	+2:47.6
33	30	Iris Schwabl	Austria	1:30	2 (0+1+1+0)	31:40.7	+2:52.3
34	31	Éva Tófalvi	Romania	1:30	3 (0+0+1+2)	31:41.4	+2:53.0
35	36	Elisa Gasparin	Switzerland	1:43	2 (0+0+0+2)	31:48.3	+2:59.9
36	48	Liudmila Kalinchik	Belarus	2:06	2 (0+0+2+0)	31:49.4	+3:01.0
37	35	Fanny Welle-Strand Horn	Norway	1:42	4 (0+1+1+2)	31:49.5	+3:01.1
38	40	Diana Rasimovičiūtė	Lithuania	1:51	3 (1+1+0+1)	31:53.3	+3:04.9
39	37	Alexia Runggaldier	Italy	1:44	2 (0+0+0+2)	31:59.0	+3:10.6
40	42	Selina Gasparin	Switzerland	1:59	5 (0+1+3+1)	32:20.8	+3:32.4
41	51	Réka Ferencz	Romania	2:13	2 (0+0+1+1)	32:24.0	+3:35.6
42	47	Jitka Landová	Czech Republic	2:04	2 (0+0+1+1)	32:31.4	+3:43.0
43	22	Valj Semerenko	Ukraine	1:11	6 (2+3+0+1)	32:33.0	+3:44.6
44	54	Megan Heinicke	Canada	2:17	3 (2+1+0+0)	32:49.2	+4:00.8
45	23	Elin Mattsson	Sweden	1:12	6 (1+1+2+2)	32:52.5	+4:04.1
46	60	Mari Laukkanen	Finland	2:26	4 (1+1+2+0)	32:57.1	+4:08.7
47	49	Susan Dunklee	United States	2:07	5 (1+1+2+1)	33:01.0	+4:12.6
48	28	Nastassia Dubarezava	Belarus	1:26	6 (2+1+2+1)	33:08.6	+4:20.2
49	52	Romana Schrempf	Austria	2:15	5 (2+1+2+0)	33:11.6	+4:23.2
50	59	Ingela Andersson	Sweden	2:26	1 (0+0+1+0)	33:11.9	+4:23.5
51	46	Annelies Cook	United States	2:03	5 (2+0+1+2)	33:23.7	+4:35.3
52	58	Amanda Lightfoot	Great Britain	2:26	4 (1+0+2+1)	34:02.5	+5:14.1
53	55	Paulina Fialková	Slovakia	2:22	6 (0+2+2+2)	34:18.4	+5:30.0
54	56	Darya Usanova	Kazakhstan	2:25	9 (2+3+2+2)	34:21.4	+5:33.0
55	45	Victoria Padial Hernández	Spain	2:03	5 (0+1+3+1)	34:21.5	+5:33.1
56	44	Elisabeth Högberg	Sweden	2:00	6 (2+1+2+1)	34:22.0	+5:33.6
57	53	Ma Wei	China	2:16	7 (2+1+2+2)	34:24.9	+5:36.5
58	41	Fuyuko Suzuki	Japan	1:56	5 (0+1+3+1)	34:30.9	+5:42.5
59	50	Nicole Gontier	Italy	2:11	9 (3+2+2+2)	34:42.7	+5:54.3
60	57	Marina Lebedeva	Kazakhstan	2:25	6 (0+2+4+0)	35:37.6	+6:49.2
