= Biathlon World Championships 2012 – Women's pursuit =

Women's pursuit at the Biathlon World Championships 2012
- Date: 4 March 2012
- Competitors: 57 from 24 nations
- Winning time: 29:39.6

Medalists
gold medal	Darya Domracheva	Belarus
silver medal	Magdalena Neuner	Germany
bronze medal	Olga Vilukhina	Russia

The women's pursuit competition of the Biathlon World Championships 2012 was held on March 4, 2012, at 16:00 local time.

== Results ==
The race started at 16:00.

Rank	Bib	Name	Country	Start	Penalties (P+P+S+S)	Time	Deficit
1st place, gold medalist(s)	2	Darya Domracheva	Belarus	0:15	2 (0+1+1+0)	29:39.6	
2nd place, silver medalist(s)	1	Magdalena Neuner	Germany	0:00	3 (0+1+0+2)	30:04.7	+25.1
3rd place, bronze medalist(s)	8	Olga Vilukhina	Russia	1:05	1 (0+0+1+0)	30:55.0	+1:15.4
4	6	Tora Berger	Norway	0:52	3 (1+0+1+1)	31:05.4	+1:25.8
5	4	Helena Ekholm	Sweden	0:45	2 (1+0+1+0)	31:07.9	+1:28.3
6	5	Marie-Laure Brunet	France	0:47	2 (0+0+1+1)	31:10.7	+1:31.1
7	16	Olga Zaitseva	Russia	1:46	1 (0+0+1+0)	31:38.2	+1:58.6
8	3	Vita Semerenko	Ukraine	0:38	3 (1+0+1+1)	31:45.3	+2:05.7
9	9	Marie Dorin-Habert	France	1:14	1 (1+0+0+0)	31:57.9	+2:18.3
10	13	Anna Maria Nilsson	Sweden	1:33	0 (0+0+0+0)	32:01.9	+2:22.3
11	34	Andrea Henkel	Germany	2:37	0 (0+0+0+0)	32:13.1	+2:33.5
12	11	Teja Gregorin	Slovenia	1:25	2 (0+0+1+1)	32:15.5	+2:35.9
13	12	Selina Gasparin	Switzerland	1:33	2 (1+0+1+0)	32:24.5	+2:44.9
14	22	Tina Bachmann	Germany	1:55	3 (0+0+1+2)	32:29.2	+2:49.6
15	17	Magdalena Gwizdoń	Poland	1:47	0 (0+0+0+0)	32:44.0	+3:04.4
16	7	Svetlana Sleptsova	Russia	1:04	3 (0+2+1+0)	32:44.5	+3:04.9
17	20	Weronika Nowakowska-Ziemniak	Poland	1:50	2 (0+1+1+0)	32:48.8	+3:09.2
18	25	Veronika Vítková	Czech Republic	2:15	2 (1+1+0+0)	32:55.9	+3:16.3
19	10	Anastasiya Kuzmina	Slovakia	1:20	5 (1+1+2+1)	32:58.8	+3:19.2
20	27	Kaisa Mäkäräinen	Finland	2:22	4 (0+1+0+3)	33:05.5	+3:25.9
21	14	Elise Ringen	Norway	1:39	4 (0+1+2+1)	33:05.6	+3:26.0
22	37	Miriam Gössner	Germany	2:49	2 (0+0+1+1)	33:06.6	+3:27.0
23	41	Anna Bogaliy-Titovets	Russia	2:50	0 (0+0+0+0)	33:11.7	+3:32.1
24	32	Synnøve Solemdal	Norway	2:31	3 (2+1+0+0)	33:18.6	+3:39.0
25	15	Mari Laukkanen	Finland	1:41	3 (0+0+2+1)	33:32.7	+3:53.1
26	18	Zina Kocher	Canada	1:48	5 (2+0+1+2)	33:46.2	+4:06.6
27	21	Krystyna Pałka	Poland	1:55	3 (0+1+1+1)	33:50.6	+4:11.0
28	19	Anaïs Bescond	France	1:50	5 (0+2+3+0)	33:53.6	+4:14.0
29	31	Nadezhda Skardino	Belarus	2:28	1 (0+0+0+1)	33:59.2	+4:19.6
30	28	Liudmila Kalinchik	Belarus	2:24	2 (1+0+1+0)	34:06.0	+4:26.4
31	53	Jana Gereková	Slovakia	3:12	3 (0+1+1+1)	34:09.1	+4:29.5
32	46	Bente Landheim	Norway	3:02	0 (0+0+0+0)	34:10.4	+4:30.8
33	35	Nastassia Dubarezava	Belarus	2:38	4 (1+0+1+2)	34:12.3	+4:32.7
34	26	Andreja Mali	Slovenia	2:20	2 (0+1+1+0)	34:15.7	+4:36.1
35	24	Fuyuko Suzuki	Japan	2:10	3 (1+0+1+1)	34:16.5	+4:36.9
36	55	Susan Dunklee	United States	3:17	3 (0+1+2+0)	34:22.4	+4:42.8
37	33	Laure Soulie	Andorra	2:36	2 (1+0+0+1)	34:22.8	+4:43.2
38	30	Agnieszka Cyl	Poland	2:28	3 (1+0+2+0)	34:34.4	+4:54.8
39	51	Megan Imrie	Canada	3:12	1 (0+0+0+1)	34:42.2	+5:02.6
40	23	Michela Ponza	Italy	2:03	3 (2+0+0+1)	34:44.7	+5:05.1
41	50	Sara Studebaker	United States	3:09	0 (0+0+0+0)	34:56.4	+5:16.8
42	52	Megan Heinicke	Canada	3:12	2 (0+0+1+1)	35:11.8	+5:32.2
43	36	Amanda Lightfoot	Great Britain	2:38	2 (0+1+0+1)	35:20.1	+5:40.5
44	47	Marina Lebedeva	Kazakhstan	3:04	3 (0+1+0+2)	35:33.7	+5:54.1
45	40	Sophie Boilley	France	2:49	3 (2+1+0+0)	35:38.6	+5:59.0
46	42	Emilia Yordanova	Bulgaria	2:52	3 (0+1+2+0)	35:39.4	+5:59.8
47	29	Franziska Hildebrand	Germany	2:24	4 (0+1+1+2)	35:42.0	+6:02.4
48	39	Juliya Dzhyma	Ukraine	2:49	3 (2+1+0+0)	35:42.2	+6:02.6
49	59	Jenny Jonsson	Sweden	3:25	1 (0+1+0+0)	35:49.1	+6:09.5
50	45	Diana Rasimovičiūtė	Lithuania	3:00	6 (0+1+2+3)	35:51.6	+6:12.0
51	58	Réka Ferencz	Romania	3:24	2 (0+0+1+1)	36:42.8	+7:03.2
52	56	Anna-Karin Strömstedt	Sweden	3:18	7 (0+0+4+3)	36:52.2	+7:12.6
53	43	Kadri Lehtla	Estonia	2:57	7 (2+0+2+3)	36:58.9	+7:18.9
—	44	Daria Yurlova	Estonia	2:59	(2+0+2+)	LAP	
—	48	Katja Haller	Italy	3:07	5 (3+0+0+2)	LAP	
—	60	Yuki Nakajima	Japan	3:29	(2+1+)	LAP	
—	57	Valj Semerenko	Ukraine	3:18	(2+0+3+)	DNF	
—	38	Elena Khrustaleva	Kazakhstan	2:49		DNS	
—	49	Natalya Burdyga	Ukraine	3:09		DNS	
—	54	Ramona Düringer	Austria	3:13		DNS	
