= Paulína Bátovská Fialková =

Slovak biathlete (born 1992)

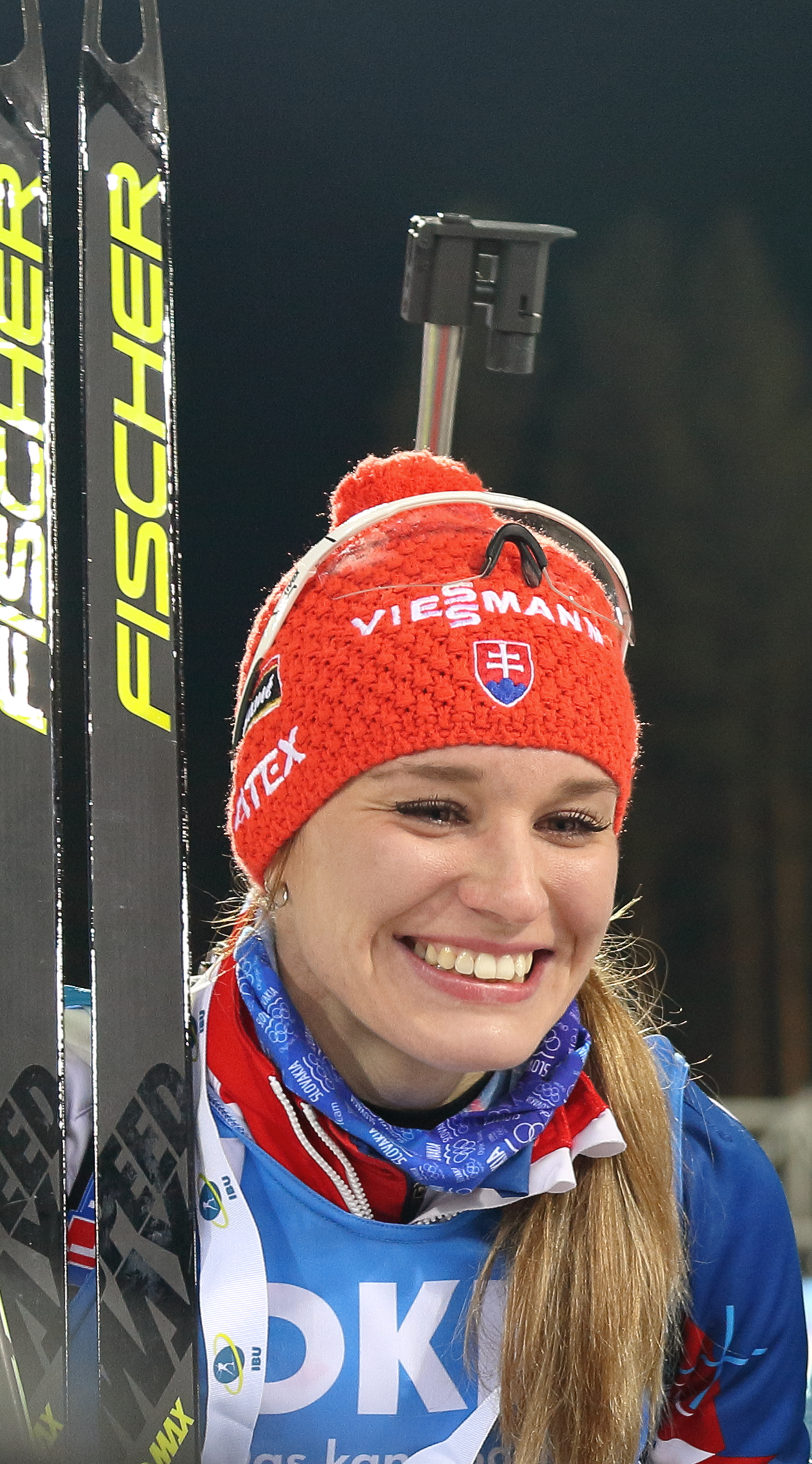

Personal information
- Born: Paulína Fialková; 25 October 1992 (age 33) Brezno, Czechoslovakia (present-day Slovakia)

Sport

Professional information
- Sport: Biathlon
- Club: Dukla Banská Bystrica
- World Cup debut: 2012

Olympic Games
- Teams: 4 (2014, 2018, 2022, 2026)
- Medals: 0 (0 gold)

World Championships
- Teams: 9 (2012, 2013, 2015, 2016, 2017, 2019, 2020, 2021, 2023)
- Medals: 0 (0 gold)

World Cup
- Seasons: 7 (2013/14–)
- Individual podiums: 9
Medal record
Women's biathlon
Representing Slovakia
Winter Universiade
Gold medal – first place	2015 Osrblie	Sprint
Silver medal – second place	2015 Osrblie	Pursuit
Bronze medal – third place	2015 Osrblie	Individual
European Championships
Silver medal – second place	2016 Tyumen	Mass Start
Silver medal – second place	2016 Tyumen	2x6 + 2x7.5 km relay

Paulína Bátovská Fialková (née Fialková, born 25 October 1992) is a former Slovak biathlete. She competed at the Biathlon World Championships 2012 and 2013, and at the 2014 Winter Olympics in Sochi, and 2018 Winter Olympics. At the 2018 Winter Olympics, she finished fifth place in the 15 km individual event.

Her younger sister Ivona Fialková also competed for Slovakia in biathlon.

In summer 2018, she became the world champion in sprint in summer biathlon on world championship in Nové Město na Moravě.

In 2018, she graduated at Faculty of Law of Matej Bel University in Banská Bystrica, Slovakia and she gain Magister degree. Her bachelor thesis was on theme The possession of firearms and ammunition for sporting purposes. She wrote it in 2015. Her diploma thesis was about International Law and Control Mechanisms of Doping in Sport.

She is the winner of prestigious Slovak award Slovenka roka 2019 (Slovak woman of the year 2019) in category sport.

In spring 2022, Paulína Fialková married the former Slovak race walker Miloš Bátovský and has since started under the double name Bátovská Fialková.

== Career ==
=== Early years ===
At the age of eight, she first participated in biathlon training. She started training at the Čierny Balog biathlon club. Before starting her studies at high school, she joined the training group for cadets and juniors led by coach Anna Murínová and moved to the Osrblie biathlon club. She became well known in 2010 when she first participated in the Youth World Championships in the junior category and immediately achieved a ninth-place finish.

==== 2010/2011 Season ====
In the 2010/2011 season, at just 18 years old, she competed in four events of the IBU Cup, as the junior category did not exist at the time. She debuted in Obertilliach with excellent 33rd and 31st places, joining older biathletes such as Prekopová, Chrapánová, and Poliaková. That season, she also competed in the World Championships in the junior category. In all events, she placed around tenth. Later, she also raced in the Junior European Championships in Italy, where her best result was 22nd in the sprint.

=== Olympic Games and World Cups ===
==== 2011/2012 Season ====
In the 2011/2012 season, Fialková also participated in the Junior European Championships in summer biathlon, where she won a silver medal in the relay, and her best individual result was sixth place in the pursuit race. At the beginning of the season, she continued in the IBU Cup but did not achieve outstanding results, especially due to her shooting.

In January, Paulína Fialková made her World Cup debut in the sprint in Nové Město na Moravě, finishing in 84th place.

At the Junior World Championships in her hometown of Osrblie, her best result was 15th in the pursuit race. She later also competed in the Junior World Championships, where her best finish was 14th in the sprint. That season, Paulína participated in her first Senior World Championships, where her best individual result was 86th in the sprint. She was also part of the women's relay team, finishing in 8th place.

==== 2012/2013 Season ====
She competed in the World Cup events in Östersund, Hochfilzen, and Oberhof, but did not make it into the top 60, who could compete in the pursuit race. However, in the relay races, she showed enough performance for the Slovak women's relay team to finish 8th and 9th.

At her last Junior World Championships, held in Austria, she finished an excellent 4th. She also participated in the Senior World Championships, where her best individual result was 53rd in the pursuit race. She also raced in the relay, helping the Slovak team to finish 8th.

==== 2013/2014 Season ====
In summer 2013, she became a two-time Junior World Champion in summer biathlon. In the mixed relay, together with Terézia Poliaková, Matej Kazár, and Miroslav Matiaško, they took third place.

The start of the season did not go well for her, and she struggled to qualify for the pursuit races. However, she traveled to the 2014 Winter Olympics in Sochi, where she competed in her only individual race, the sprint, finishing 72nd.

At the penultimate World Cup round in Kontiolahti, she achieved her best result so far, 10th place in the sprint, becoming the 11th Slovak biathlete since the creation of independent Slovakia to place in the top 10 at a World Cup race.

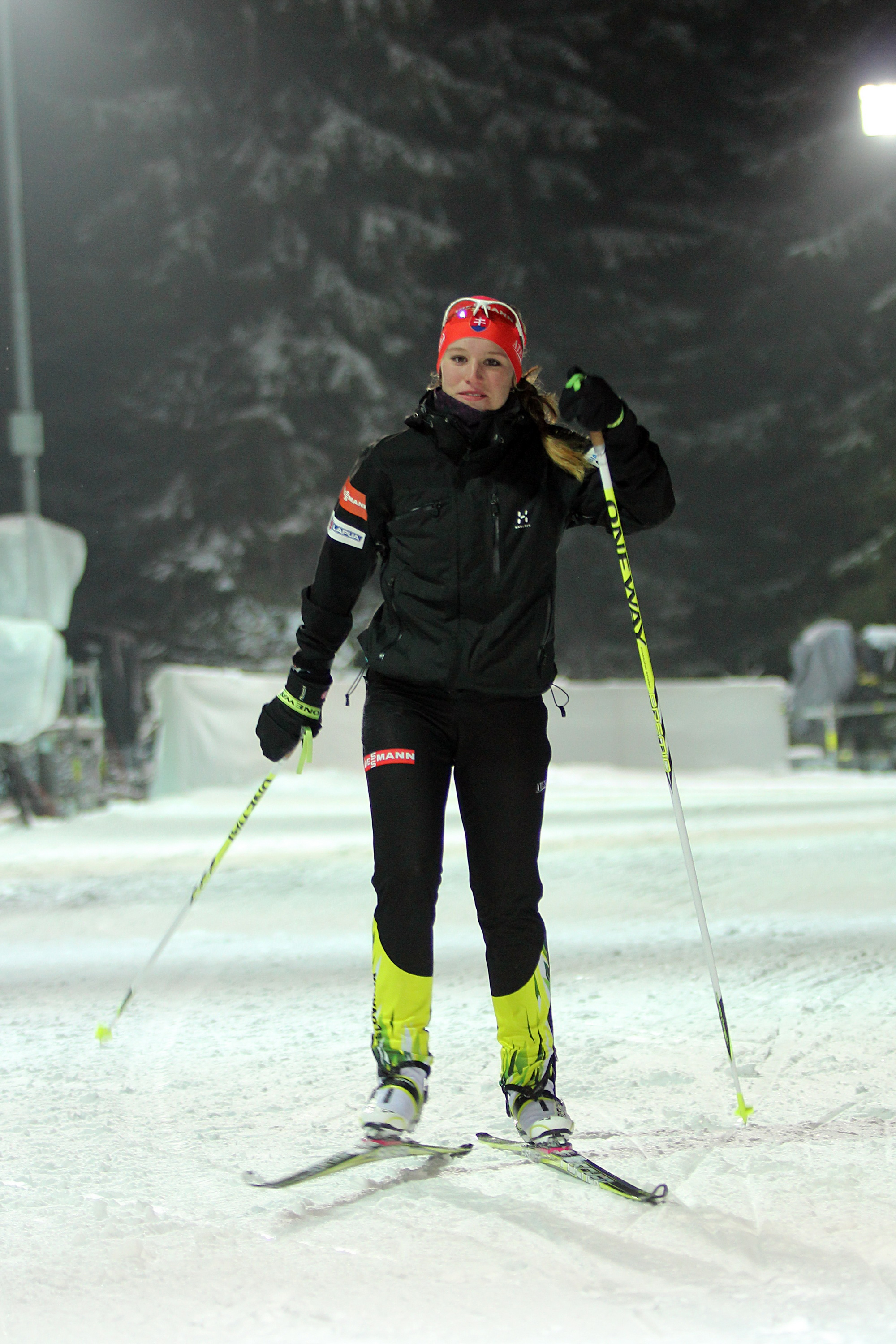
Paulína Fialková in 2013 in Nové Město na Moravě

==== 2014/2015 Season ====
Her season began poorly, but in the second round of the World Cup in Hochfilzen, she placed 28th in the sprint and 34th in the pursuit race. In later World Cup rounds, she regularly placed around 40th. At the World Championships in Kontiolahti, she finished in the 6th and 9th tens, and the relay team, in which she was a member, placed 19th, marking the worst result for the Slovak women's relay team in history.

In January 2015, she competed at the Winter Universiade in Osrblie. In the endurance race, she placed 3rd, in the sprint, she hit all targets and won by 30 seconds, and in the pursuit, she finished 2nd.

==== 2015/2016 Season ====
She gradually improved during the season. In Ruhpolding, her form peaked, and she achieved her best results at the time: 6th, 7th, 14th, and 15th places. She made it into the top 30 biathletes in the World Cup, remaining there even when she had to miss several races due to illness. She finished the season in 36th place in the World Cup with 199 points. She also improved her shooting accuracy to 82.5%, placing her among the world's best. Her shooting time also decreased from 36.2 seconds to 30.5 seconds. She reduced her running time deficit to the fastest athlete in the sprint from 1:37 to 0:57.

That season, her coach Anna Murínová became the national coach, allowing Paulína to travel to World Cup events, and the team also added strength and conditioning coach Martin Bajčičák.

In 2015, she became a professional athlete for the Dukla Banská Bystrica Military Sports Center.

==== 2016/2017 Season ====
At the start of the season, she did not feel well and missed the first two rounds of the World Cup due to health problems. When she resumed racing, she was still not in good shape and struggled. During the holidays, she underwent tests that revealed pulmonary chlamydia, leading to a two-week antibiotic treatment and a training ban. In her first race of the new year in Ruhpolding, she lost more than two minutes on the track. In Anterselva, where only endurance races were held, Fialková did not excel, but she improved her running time.

At the World Championships in Osrblie, her home track, she was healthy and achieved a great result, finishing 3rd. At the World Cup in Hochfilzen she finished 31st in the sprint, and in the pursuit race, she moved up to 12th place. The end of the season was successful for her, with most results in the second ten. In Kontiolahti she even achieved 5th place in the pursuit race.

==== 2017/2018 Season ====
Paulína started the season excellently, in the mixed relay in Östersund, she was the fastest on her leg, although she had to reload three times, she passed the baton with just a 7-second deficit. Slovakia's relay team finished 4th. She immediately placed an excellent 5th in the first endurance race of the season, missing just one target. In the next World Cup round, however, she missed 4 targets in the sprint and finished in the 70s, failing to make it to the pursuit race. In Hochfilzen, she faced health problems, and after a poor sprint, she had to withdraw from the pursuit race. She skipped the World Cup in Oberhof as planned to recover.

== Biathlon results ==
All results are sourced from the International Biathlon Union.

=== Olympic Games ===
0 medals

Event	Individual	Sprint	Pursuit	Mass start	Relay	Mixed relay
(Russia) 2014 Sochi	—	72nd	—	—	14th	—
(South Korea) 2018 Pyeongchang	5th	11th	38th	21st	5th	20th
(China) 2022 Beijing	42nd	14th	10th	26th	19th	17th
(Italy) 2026 Milano Cortina	40th	40th	25th	—	10th	19th

*The mixed relay was added as an event in 2014.

=== World Championships ===
0 medals

Event	Individual	Sprint	Pursuit	Mass start	Relay	Mixed relay	Single mixed relay
(Germany) 2012 Ruhpolding	—	86th	—	—	8th	—	—N/a
(Czech Republic) 2013 Nové Město	—	55th	53rd	—	8th	—	—N/a
(Finland) 2015 Kontiolahti	53rd	88th	—	—	18th	17th	—N/a
(Norway) 2016 Oslo	76th	49th	23rd	—	14th	17th	—N/a
(Austria) 2017 Hochfilzen	27th	31st	12th	10th	8th	12th	—N/a
(Sweden) 2019 Östersund	5th	48th	DNS	12th	6th	12th	—
(Italy) 2020 Antholz-Anterselva	24th	16th	17th	15th	17th	—	—
(Slovenia) 2021 Pokljuka	50th	13th	41st	—	21st	18th	21st
(Germany) 2023 Oberhof	18th	25th	25th	16th	—	—	
(Switzerland) 2025 Lenzerheide	40th	22nd	29th	—	6th	12th	—

*During Olympic seasons competitions are only held for those events not included in the Olympic program.
**The single mixed relay was added as an event in 2019.

=== World Cup ===
Season	Age	Overall			Sprint			Pursuit			Individual			Mass start		
Season	Age	Races	Points	Position	Races	Points	Position	Races	Points	Position	Races	Points	Position	Races	Points	Position
2013/14	21	9/22	48	61st	6/9	48	52nd	2/8	–	–	1/2	–	–	0/3	—	—
2014/15	22	13/25	22	74th	8/10	13	72nd	2/7	7	73rd	3/3	2	68th	0/5	—	—
2015/16	23	16/25	201	35th	6/9	31	61st	5/8	93	28th	3/3	36	26th	2/5	41	32nd
2016/17	24	18/26	292	31st	8/9	79	39th	6/9	141	25th	2/3	14	53rd	2/5	58	28th
2017/18	25	16/22	247	32nd	7/8	72	39th	5/7	49	44th	2/2	44	15th	2/5	82	21st
2018/19	26	23/25	687	6th	8/9	228	7th	7/8	154	17th	3/3	111	2nd	5/5	194	3rd
2019/20	27	19/21	489	13th	8/8	191	10th	4/5	149	6th	2/3	17	45th	5/5	132	11th
2020/21	28	12/26	118	52nd	7/10	75	43rd	4/8	43	46th	1/3	–	–	0/5	—	—
2021/22	29	6/9	30	49th	4/4	7	58th	1/3	21	36th	1/1	2	39th	0/1	—	—

=== Overall record ===
Result	Individual	Sprint	Pursuit	Mass start	Relay	Mixed relay	Total		
Result	Individual	Sprint	Pursuit	Mass start	Relay	Mixed relay	Individual events	Team events	All events
1st place	–	–	–	–	–	–	–	–	–
2nd place	–	–	2	2	–	–	4	–	4
3rd place	1	2	2	2	–	–	7	–	7
Podiums	1	2	4	4	–	–	11	–	11
Top 10	–	–	–	–	–	–	–	–	–
Points	–	–	–	–	–	–	–	–	–
Others	–	–	–	–	–	–	–	–	–
DNF	–	–	–	–	–	–	–	–	–
DSQ	–	–	–	–	–	–	–	–	–
Starts	–	–	–	–	–	–	–	–	–

* Results in IBU World Cup races, Olympics and World Championships.

==== Individual podiums ====
Season	Place	Competition	Placement
2017–18	(Russia) Tyumen	Mass start	2nd
2018–19	(Slovenia) Pokljuka	Pursuit	3rd
2018–19	(Austria) Hochfilzen	Pursuit	2nd
2018–19	(Czech Republic) Nové Město na Moravě	Sprint	3rd
2018–19	(Czech Republic) Nové Město na Moravě	Mass start	2nd
2018–19	(Germany) Ruhpolding	Mass start	3rd
2018–19	(Norway) Oslo	Sprint	3rd
2019–20	(Germany) Ruhpolding	Pursuit	2nd
2021–22	(Norway) Oslo	Pursuit	3rd
2024–25	(France) Annecy	Mass start	3rd
2025–26	(Finland) Kontiolahti	Individual	3rd
