= Biathlon World Championships 2016 – Mixed relay =

Mixed relay at the Biathlon World Championships 2016
- Venue: Oslo, Norway
- Date: 3 March
- Competitors: 100 from 25 nations
- Teams: 25
- Winning time: 1:14:01.0

Medalists
gold medal	Anaïs Bescond; Marie Dorin Habert; Quentin Fillon Maillet; Martin Fourcade	France
silver medal	Franziska Preuß; Franziska Hildebrand; Arnd Peiffer; Simon Schempp	Germany
bronze medal	Marte Olsbu; Tiril Eckhoff; Johannes Thingnes Bø; Tarjei Bø	Norway

The Mixed relay event of the Biathlon World Championships 2016 was held on 3 March 2016.

== Results ==
The race was started at 15:30 CET.

Rank	Bib	Team	Time	Penalties (P+S)	Deficit
1st place, gold medalist(s)	3	France; Anaïs Bescond; Marie Dorin Habert; Quentin Fillon Maillet; Martin Fourcade	1:14:01.0; 18:10.7; 17:34.2; 19:04.5; 19:11.6	0+2 0+6; 0+0 0+3; 0+0 0+1; 0+2 0+1; 0+0 0+1	
2nd place, silver medalist(s)	2	Germany; Franziska Preuß; Franziska Hildebrand; Arnd Peiffer; Simon Schempp	1:14:05.3; 17:51.8; 17:52.9; 19:04.9; 19:15.7	0+5 0+2; 0+2 0+0; 0+2 0+0; 0+0 0+1; 0+1 0+1	+4.3
3rd place, bronze medalist(s)	1	Norway; Marte Olsbu; Tiril Eckhoff; Johannes Thingnes Bø; Tarjei Bø	1:14:15.4; 17:37.1; 18:07.4; 19:05.7; 19:25.2	0+7 0+3; 0+1 0+0; 0+2 0+2; 0+1 0+1; 0+3 0+0	+14.4
4	10	Ukraine; Valj Semerenko; Olena Pidhrushna; Serhiy Semenov; Dmytro Pidruchnyi	1:14:30.8; 17:51.7; 17:52.2; 19:04.3; 19:41.6	0+3 0+6; 0+1 0+1; 0+2 0+2; 0+0 0+1; 0+0 0+2	+29.8
5	8	Austria; Dunja Zdouc; Lisa Hauser; Simon Eder; Dominik Landertinger	1:15:08.1; 19:02.9; 18:10.3; 18:54.4; 19:00.5	0+1 0+2; 0+1 0+1; 0+0 0+0; 0+0 0+1; 0+0 0+0	+1:07.1
6	9	Czech Republic; Veronika Vítková; Gabriela Soukalová; Michal Šlesingr; Michal Krčmář	1:15:24.3; 18:44.2; 17:36.7; 19:18.2; 19:45.2	0+3 0+2; 0+3 0+2; 0+0 0+0; 0+0 0+0; 0+0 0+0	+1:23.3
7	4	Russia; Ekaterina Shumilova; Ekaterina Yurlova; Evgeniy Garanichev; Anton Shipulin	1:15:33.9; 19:05.5; 18:04.4; 18:57.3; 19:26.7	0+3 1+5; 0+0 1+3; 0+0 0+1; 0+1 0+1; 0+2 0+0	+1:32.9
8	7	Italy; Dorothea Wierer; Karin Oberhofer; Lukas Hofer; Dominik Windisch	1:15:56.4; 17:52.0; 19:08.7; 19:24.2; 19:31.5	0+9 0+6; 0+1 0+0; 0+3 0+3; 0+2 0+3; 0+3 0+0	+1:55.4
9	12	Belarus; Nadezhda Skardino; Iryna Kryuko; Vladimir Chepelin; Aliaksandr Darozhka	1:16:10.1; 18:01.2; 18:49.5; 19:36.1; 19:43.3	0+0 0+1; 0+0 0+0; 0+0 0+1; 0+0 0+0; 0+0 0+0	+2:09.1
10	11	United States; Susan Dunklee; Hannah Dreissigacker; Lowell Bailey; Sean Doherty	1:16:20.6; 17:35.5; 19:00.3; 19:46.9; 19:57.9	0+3 0+2; 0+0 0+0; 0+2 0+1; 0+0 0+0; 0+1 0+1	+2:19.6
11	5	Canada; Julia Ransom; Rosanna Crawford; Nathan Smith; Brendan Green	1:16:31.8; 18:38.9; 18:33.3; 19:12.9; 20:06.7	0+5 0+6; 0+1 0+1; 0+1 0+2; 0+2 0+1; 0+1 0+2	+2:30.8
12	6	Sweden; Linn Persson; Mona Brorsson; Jesper Nelin; Fredrik Lindström	1:16:54.3; 18:36.5; 18:01.2; 20:36.8; 19:39.8	0+3 1+3; 0+2 0+0; 0+0 0+0; 0+1 1+3; 0+0 0+0	+2:53.3
13	17	Slovenia; Andreja Mali; Teja Gregorin; Klemen Bauer; Jakov Fak	1:17:10.8; 18:56.0; 19:38.3; 19:22.1; 19:14.4	0+1 1+6; 0+0 0+0; 0+1 1+3; 0+0 0+2; 0+0 0+1	+3:09.8
14	14	Switzerland; Selina Gasparin; Aita Gasparin; Benjamin Weger; Serafin Wiestner	1:17:19.3; 18:11.6; 18:49.1; 20:30.2; 19:48.4	1+4 0+8; 0+0 0+3; 0+0 0+1; 1+3 0+2; 0+1 0+2	+3:18.3
15	15	Kazakhstan; Alina Raikova; Galina Vishnevskaya; Yan Savitskiy; Anton Pantov	1:17:23.5; 19:05.3; 18:15.4; 19:35.1; 20:27.7	0+1 0+3; 0+1 0+2; 0+0 0+0; 0+0 0+0; 0+0 0+1	+3:22.5
16	25	Bulgaria; Emilia Yordanova; Desislava Stoyanova; Krasimir Anev; Vladimir Iliev	1:17:27.2; 19:06.4; 19:17.3; 19:33.4; 19:30.1	0+4 0+6; 0+1 0+1; 0+2 0+2; 0+1 0+1; 0+0 0+2	+3:26.2
17	19	Slovakia; Paulína Fialková; Jana Gereková; Matej Kazár; Martin Otčenáš	1:17:43.7; 18:48.8; 18:20.9; 19:23.1; 21:10.9	0+9 1+8; 0+3 0+3; 0+2 0+2; 0+1 0+0; 0+3 1+3	+3:42.7
18	16	Finland; Mari Laukkanen; Kaisa Mäkäräinen; Olli Hiidensalo; Tuomas Grönman	1:18:47.3; 19:07.7; 18:24.2; 20:40.2; 20:35.2	0+6 1+6; 0+2 0+1; 0+3 0+2; 0+1 1+3; 0+1 0+0	+4:46.3
19	13	Japan; Fuyuko Tachizaki; Yurie Tanaka; Mikito Tachizaki; Junji Nagai	1:18:56.9; 18:11.5; 19:11.6; 20:36.2; 20:57.6	0+1 0+3; 0+0 0+1; 0+0 0+1; 0+0 0+1; 0+1 0+0	+4:55.9
20	20	Poland; Weronika Nowakowska; Krystyna Guzik; Łukasz Szczurek; Grzegorz Guzik	1:19:18.1; 19:17.4; 17:52.6; 21:34.1; 20:34.0	0+2 1+8; 0+0 1+3; 0+0 0+0; 0+2 0+3; 0+0 0+2	+5:17.1
21	23	Estonia; Kadri Lehtla; Meril Beilmann; Rene Zahkna; Kalev Ermits	1:20:09.8; 19:06.4; 20:37.6; 20:06.3; 20:19.5	0+1 1+4; 0+1 0+0; 0+0 0+0; 0+0 0+1; 0+0 1+3	+6:08.8
22	18	Romania; Luminița Pișcoran; Florina Ioana Cîrstea; George Buta; Cornel Puchianu	LAP; 20:10.3; 20:20.2; 20:35.1	0+4 2+6; 0+0 1+3; 0+2 0+0; 0+1 0+0; 0+1 1+3	
23	24	Lithuania; Diana Rasimovičiūtė; Natalija Kočergina; Tomas Kaukėnas; Vytautas Strolia	LAP		
24	21	South Korea; Mun Ji-hee; Ko Eun-jung; Kim Jong-min; Lee In-bok	LAP		
25	22	Latvia; Baiba Bendika; Žanna Juškāne; Roberts Slotiņš; Aleksandrs Patrijuks	LAP		
