= Biathlon World Championships 2015 – Women's mass start =

Women's mass start at the Biathlon World Championships 2015
- Venue: Kontiolahti, Finland
- Date: 15 March 2015
- Competitors: 30 from 17 nations
- Winning time: 34:32.9

Medalists
gold medal	Valj Semerenko	Ukraine
silver medal	Franziska Preuß	Germany
bronze medal	Karin Oberhofer	Italy

The Women's mass start event of the Biathlon World Championships 2015 was held on 15 March 2015. 30 athletes participated over a course of 12.5 km.

== Results ==
The race was started at 14:30 EET.

Rank	Bib	Name	Nationality	Time	Penalties (P+P+S+S)	Deficit
1st place, gold medalist(s)	6	Valj Semerenko	Ukraine	34:32.9	0 (0+0+0+0)	
2nd place, silver medalist(s)	15	Franziska Preuß	Germany	34:39.1	1 (0+0+0+1)	+6.2
3rd place, bronze medalist(s)	13	Karin Oberhofer	Italy	34:45.5	2 (1+1+0+0)	+12.6
4	8	Darya Domracheva	Belarus	34:47.6	2 (0+0+2+0)	+14.7
5	5	Gabriela Soukalová	Czech Republic	34:59.1	1 (0+0+0+1)	+26.2
6	10	Franziska Hildebrand	Germany	35:04.6	0 (0+0+0+0)	+31.7
7	4	Laura Dahlmeier	Germany	35:12.8	2 (0+1+0+1)	+39.9
8	1	Marie Dorin Habert	France	35:13.9	3 (0+2+0+1)	+41.0
9	16	Anaïs Bescond	France	35:14.4	2 (0+1+0+0)	+41.5
10	19	Ekaterina Shumilova	Russia	35:14.7	1 (0+0+0+1)	+41.8
11	2	Ekaterina Yurlova	Russia	35:31.5	2 (0+0+2+0)	+58.6
12	23	Jana Gereková	Slovakia	35:33.2	2 (0+1+1+0)	+1:00.3
13	27	Lisa Hauser	Austria	35:53.9	0 (0+0+0+0)	+1:21.0
14	7	Kaisa Mäkäräinen	Finland	36:02.6	4 (3+0+0+1)	+1:29.7
15	12	Tiril Eckhoff	Norway	36:03.2	4 (0+2+1+1)	+1:30.3
16	18	Krystyna Guzik	Poland	36:06.6	2 (1+0+1+0)	+1:33.7
17	28	Fuyuko Suzuki	Japan	36:07.1	2 (1+1+0+0)	+1:34.2
18	22	Magdalena Gwizdoń	Poland	36:11.1	2 (0+0+1+1)	+1:38.2
19	30	Susan Dunklee	United States	36:33.9	5 (1+1+2+1)	+2:01.0
20	24	Andreja Mali	Slovenia	36:36.9	2 (0+0+0+2)	+2:04.0
21	17	Daria Virolaynen	Russia	36:42.6	5 (0+0+3+2)	+2:09.7
22	3	Weronika Nowakowska-Ziemniak	Poland	36:54.2	5 (0+1+2+2)	+2:21.3
23	26	Megan Heinicke	Canada	36:55.1	1 (1+0+0+0)	+2:22.2
24	20	Elisa Gasparin	Switzerland	37:32.8	4 (3+0+0+1)	+2:59.9
25	29	Nastassia Dubarezava	Belarus	37:42.1	5 (1+2+2+0)	+3:09.2
26	11	Dorothea Wierer	Italy	37:52.1	6 (1+3+1+1)	+3:19.2
27	21	Olga Abramova	Ukraine	38:09.2	6 (2+1+2+1)	+3:36.3
28	9	Veronika Vítková	Czech Republic	38:40.6	6 (3+2+1+0)	+4:07.7
29	25	Dunja Zdouc	Austria	39:02.5	4 (1+0+1+2)	+4:29.6
DSQ	14	Ekaterina Glazyrina	Russia	35:42.9	1 (0+0+0+1)	+1:10.0
