= Valentyna Semerenko =

Ukrainian biathlete (born 1986)

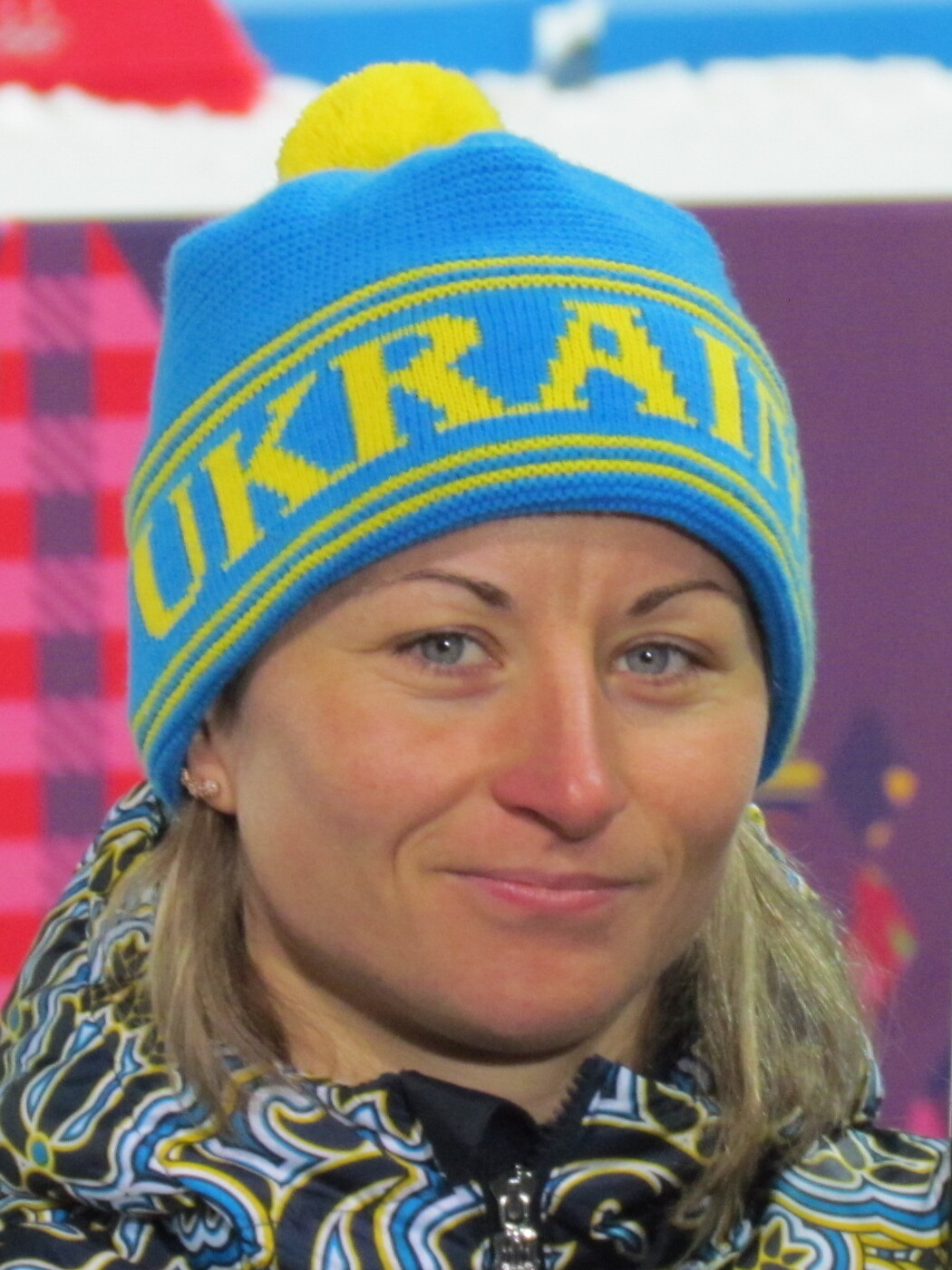

Personal information
- Full name: Valentyna Oleksandrivna Semerenko
- Born: 18 January 1986 (age 40) Krasnopillia, Sumy Oblast, Ukrainian SSR, now Ukraine
- Height: 1.61 m (5 ft 3 in)
- Weight: 54 kg (119 lb)

Sport

Professional information
- Sport: Biathlon
- Club: Dynamo Ukraine
- World Cup debut: 2016

Olympic Games
- Teams: 4 (2006–2018)
- Medals: 1 (1 gold)

World Championships
- Teams: 10 (2007–2019)
- Medals: 6 (1 gold)

World Cup
- Seasons: 2005–2023
- Individual victories: 2
- Individual podiums: 11 (incl. 3 at World Champ.)
Medal record
Representing Ukraine
Women's biathlon
Olympic Games
Gold medal – first place	2014 Sochi	4 x 6 km relay
World Championships
Gold medal – first place	2015 Kontiolahti	12.5 km mass start
Silver medal – second place	2008 Östersund	4 x 6 km relay
Silver medal – second place	2013 Nové Město	4 x 6 km relay
Bronze medal – third place	2013 Nové Město	15 km individual
Bronze medal – third place	2015 Kontiolahti	7.5 km sprint
Bronze medal – third place	2019 Östersund	4 x 6 km relay
European Championships
Gold medal – first place	2008 Nové Město	Relay
Gold medal – first place	2009 Ufa	Relay
Gold medal – first place	2010 Otepää	Sprint
Gold medal – first place	2011 Ridanna	Relay
Gold medal – first place	2012 Osrblie	Relay
Gold medal – first place	2015 Otepää	Relay
Gold medal – first place	2020 Raubichi	Mixed relay
Silver medal – second place	2010 Otepää	Relay
Silver medal – second place	2012 Osrblie	7.5 km sprint
Silver medal – second place	2012 Osrblie	10 km pursuit
Bronze medal – third place	2007 Bansko	Relay
Junior World Championships
Silver medal – second place	2005 Kontiolahti	Girl's relay
Junior European Championships
Silver medal – second place	2005 Novosibirsk	Relay
Universiade
Silver medal – second place	2007 Turin	Relay
Silver medal – second place	2007 Turin	Sprint
Bronze medal – third place	2007 Turin	12.5 km mass start

Valentyna Oleksandrivna Semerenko (Ukrainian: Валентина Олександрівна Семеренко), known also as Valya Semerenko and featuring in statistics as Valj Semerenko (born 18 January 1986) is a Ukrainian biathlete. She is Olympic and World champion, multiple World championships medalist, and one of the most successful Ukrainian winter athletes.

== Career ==
When she was in the fourth grade of elementary school, she took up cross-country skiing together with her twin sister Vita. But later, they decided to switch to biathlon. She began competing internationally a year earlier than Vita. In 2004 she took part at Junior World Championships in Maurienne, France. In 2005 she won two medals at Junior World and one at Junior European Championships. On 17 December 2005, she debuted in Biathlon World Cup. She finished her first World Cup sprint competition in Osrblie, Slovakia, ranking 47th. Valja managed to qualify for 2006 Winter Olympics, where she took part only in individual race, finishing 46th.

For the first time, she participated at the World Championships in 2007 in Antholz-Anterselva, Italy. Valja missed almost half of the 2006-07 Biathlon World Cup. The next season was more successful. She won the silver medal in the 4×6 km relay event at the Biathlon World Championships 2008. First World Cup relay victory came on 7 January 2009, in Oberhof, Germany.

She represented Ukraine at the 2010 Winter Olympics in Vancouver, British Columbia, Canada. In all races she placed between 13 and 23.

First individual podium Valja celebrated on 4 February 2011, in Presque Isle, United States, in sprint. At the 2013 World Championships, Valja won bronze in individual race and silver in relay. On 15 December 2013, Valja won a pursuit race in Annecy, France, which was her first individual World Cup victory.

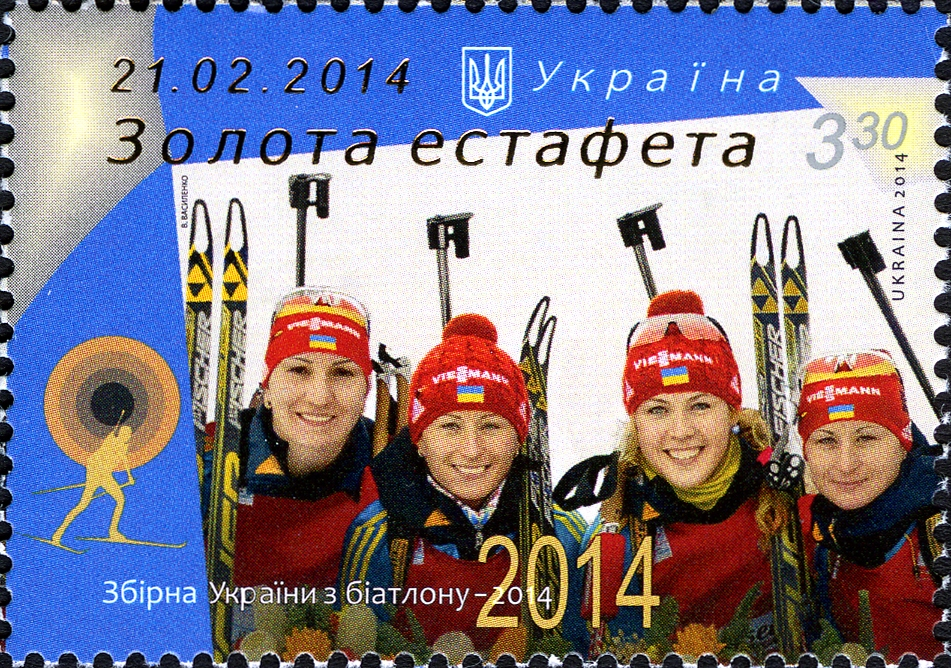
Stamps of Ukraine, 2014

Together with Juliya Dzhyma, Vita Semerenko and Olena Pidhrushna she won the gold medal in the Women's relay at the 2014 Winter Olympics, in Sochi, Russia.

2014–15 season was the most successful as of January 2018. That season she had four individual podiums and finished third in World Cup classification, being the second-ever Ukrainian biathlete to finish a season in Top-3 after Olena Zubrilova. After Christmas, Valja together with Serhiy Semenov, she won World Team Challenge. The most memorable achievement was victory in mass start at 2015 World Championships in Kontiolahti, Finland. The next two seasons weren't very successful due to illnesses and weak physical conditions. Valja was forced to miss a lot of races.

She qualified to represent Ukraine at the 2018 Winter Olympics. Her best personal result at the Games was 19th place in the mass start. She expected to run in the women's relay but wasn't included in the roster. Later she accused coaches of ignoring her results and including not so successful at the Games Iryna Varvynets and Anastasiya Merkushyna in the relay team. Her sister Vita Semerenko later told in an interview that Valja cried for hours after discovering that she wouldn't participate in the relay. In the evening before the competition, Valja posted on Facebook that "we don't have any team", "our team is just ***" and so on, and that she has something more to unveil about the team. Next day she said that she may finish her sport career immediately after the Games. Nevertheless, she competed in World Cup after the Games.

== Personal life ==
Biathlete Vita is her twin sister. Valja is married to Oleksiy Prokhor. She graduated from Sumy State Pedagogical Makarenko University.

== Results ==
=== Winter Olympics ===
Year	Event	IN	SP	PU	MS	RL	MRL
2006	Turin, Italy	46					
2010	Vancouver, Canada	13	23	23	19	6	
2014	Sochi, Russia	19	12	5	12	1	
2018	Pyeongchang, South Korea	25	46	DNS	19		
2022	Beijing, China	DNF					13

=== World Championships ===
Year	Event	IN	SP	PU	MS	RL	MRL
2007	Rasen-Antholz, Italy	36				9	
2008	Östersund, Sweden	32	16	20	18	2	
2009	Pyeongchang, South Korea	26	15	38	16	DNF	11
2011	Khanty-Mansiysk, Russia	11	10	24	16	DSQ	
2012	Ruhpolding, Germany	49	57	DNF		6	
2013	Nové Město na Moravě, Czech Republic	3	22	43	DNF	2	
2015	Kontiolahti, Finland	15	3	19	1	6	11
2016	Oslo, Norway	44	38		26	5	4
2017	Hochfilzen, Austria		80				
2019	Östersund, Sweden	36	29	38		3	
2020	Rasen-Antholz, Italy	42	36	43			
2021	Pokljuka, Slovenia		50	DNF			

=== World Cup ===
==== Individual podiums ====
Season	Place	Competition	Placement
2010–11	Presque Isle, United States	Sprint	3
2012–13	Oberhof, Germany	Pursuit	3
2013–14	Annecy-Le Grand-Bornand, France	Sprint	3
2013–14	Annecy-Le Grand-Bornand, France	Pursuit	1
2014–15	Östersund, Sweden	Individual	3
2014–15	Östersund, Sweden	Pursuit	2
2014–15	Pokljuka, Slovenia	Sprint	3
2014–15	Pokljuka, Slovenia	Pursuit	3

==== Relay podiums ====
Season	Place	Competition	Placement
2008–09	Oberhof, Germany	Relay	1
2010–11	Hochfilzen, Austria	Relay	2
2012–13	Hochfilzen, Austria	Relay	2
2012–13	Oberhof, Germany	Relay	1
2012–13	Sochi, Russia	Relay	2
2013–14	Östersund, Sweden	Mixed relay	3
2013–14	Hochfilzen, Austria	Relay	1
2013–14	Ruhpolding, Germany	Relay	3
2013–14	Annecy-Le Grand-Bornand, France	Relay	2
2014–15	Antholz, Italy	Relay	3
2014–15	Nové Město na Moravě, Czech Republic	Mixed relay	3
2015–16	Hochfilzen, Austria	Relay	3
2015–16	Ruhpolding, Germany	Relay	1
2017–18	Hochfilzen, Austria	Relay	2

==== Positions ====
- Position (and scores) are shown in the table.

Season	Individual	Sprint	Pursuit	Mass starts	TOTAL
2006–07	26 (32)	53 (20)	55 (8)		47 (60)
2007–08	37 (14)	28 (83)	28 (58)	30 (35)	28 (190)
2008–09	25 (56)	30 (105)	33 (61)	14 (115)	24 (349)
2009–10	8 (102)	19 (195)	14 (125)	20 (97)	14 (538)
2010–11	2 (159)	14 (240)	12 (161)	14 (127)	11 (678)
2011–12	29 (32)	25 (129)	21 (122)	23 (73)	22 (356)
2012–13	9 (86)	21 (160)	25 (107)	23 (85)	20 (438)
2013–14	8 (59)	10 (186)	6 (233)	13 (75)	8 (553)
2014–15	11 (74)	5 (328)	3 (255)	2 (210)	3 (865)
2015–16	50 (15)	51 (43)	37 (67)	46 (14)	47 (139)
2016–17		74 (11)	73 (13)		79 (24)
