= 2016 IBU Open European Championships =

International biathlon competition

The 23nd IBU Open European Championships were held in Tyumen, Russia from February 24 to February 28, 2016.

There were total of 8 competitions: single mixed relay, relay mixed, sprint women, sprint men, pursuit women, pursuit men, mass start women and mass start men.

== Schedule of events ==
The schedule of the event stands below. All times in CET.

Date	Time	Event
February 24	11:00	Single Mixed Relay
February 24	14:00	Relay Mixed
February 25	11:00	Sprint Women
February 25	14:00	Sprint Men
February 27	10:00	Pursuit Women
February 27	13:00	Pursuit Men
February 28	10:00	Mass Start Women
February 28	13:00	Mass Start Men

== Results ==
=== Men's ===
Event	Gold		Silver		Bronze	
Men's 10 km sprint Details	Evgeniy Garanichev; Russia	23:40.3 (0+1)	Henrik L'Abée-Lund; Norway	23:45.3 (0+0)	Anton Babikov; Russia	23:50.0 (0+0)
Men's 12.5 km pursuit Details	Anton Babikov; Russia	30:01.5 (0+0+0+1)	Evgeniy Garanichev; Russia	30:01.6 (0+0+0+1)	Florian Graf; Germany	30:47.5 (1+0+1+0)
Men's 15 km mass start Details	Florian Graf; Germany	38:20.5 (0+1+0+0)	Jaroslav Soukup; Czech Republic	38:24.6 (0+1+0+0)	Vladimir Iliev; Bulgaria	38:29.5 (0+1+1+0)

=== Women's ===
Event	Gold		Silver		Bronze	
Women's 7.5 km sprint Details	Nadine Horchler; Germany	21:53.0 (0+1)	Karolin Horchler; Germany	22:05.7 (0+0)	Annika Knoll; Germany	22:21.5 (0+0)
Women's 10 km pursuit Details	Nadezhda Skardino; Belarus	30:01.7 (0+0+0+2)	Karolin Horchler; Germany	30:09.1 (1+0+1+0)	Ingrid Landmark Tandrevold; Norway	30:15.8 (0+1+2+0)
Women's 12.5 km mass start Details	Luise Kummer; Germany	36:05.1 (1+0+0+1)	Paulína Fialková; Slovakia	36:13.1 (2+0+1+0)	Ingrid Landmark Tandrevold; Norway	36:16.4 (1+0+2+1)

=== Mixed ===
Event	Gold		Silver		Bronze	
Single mixed relay Details	Russia; Victoria Slivko; Anton Babikov; Victoria Slivko; Anton Babikov	36:59.0 (0+0) (0+0) (0+0) (0+0) (0+0) (0+0) (0+2) (0+2)	Germany; Luise Kummer; Matthias Dorfer; Luise Kummer; Matthias Dorfer	37:36.9 (0+2) (0+1) (0+1) (0+1) (0+1) (0+0) (0+1) (0+0)	Norway; Ingrid Landmark Tandrevold; Vetle Sjåstad Christiansen; Ingrid Landmark Tandrevold; Vetle Sjåstad Christiansen	37:51.7 (0+0) (0+2) (0+0) (0+1) (0+0) (0+2) (0+0) (0+1)
2 x 6 + 2 x 7.5 km relay Details	Russia; Anastasia Zagoruiko; Olga Iakushova; Matvey Eliseev; Evgeniy Garanichev	1:10:56.3 (0+2) (1+3) (0+0) (0+0) (0+2) (0+0) (0+1) (0+1)	(Slovakia) Slovakia; Paulína Fialková; Jana Gereková; Matej Kazár; Martin Otčenáš	1:10:56.4 (0+1) (0+1) (0+1) (0+0) (0+0) (0+0) (0+1) (0+1)	(Norway) Norway; Sigrid Bilstad Neraasen; Bente Landheim; Henrik L'Abée-Lund; Håvard Bogetveit	1:12:00.4 (0+0) (0+0) (0+1) (0+2) (0+3) (0+3) (0+1) (0+2)

== Medal table ==
Rank	Nation	Gold	Silver	Bronze	Total
1	Russia (RUS)	4	1	1	6
2	Germany (GER)	3	3	2	8
3	Belarus (BLR)	1	0	0	1
4	Slovakia (SVK)	0	2	0	2
5	Norway (NOR)	0	1	4	5
6	Czech Republic (CZE)	0	1	0	1
7	Bulgaria (BUL)	0	0	1	1
Totals (7 entries)		8	8	8	24
