= Annelies Cook =

American biathlete (born 1984)

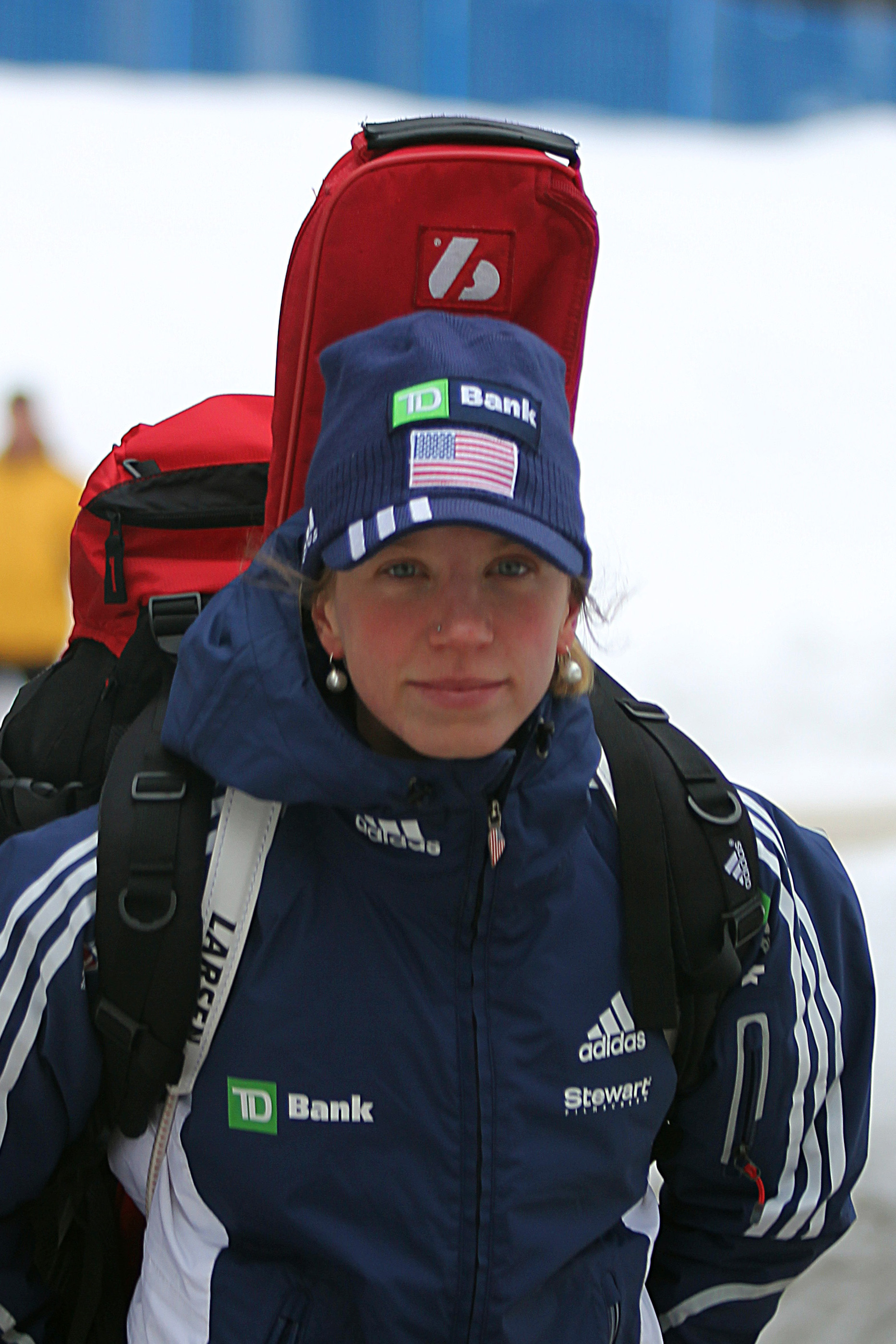
- Cook in 2011

Personal information
- Born: August 1, 1984 (age 41) Providence, Rhode Island, U.S.
- Height: 5 ft 6 in (168 cm)

Sport
- Sport: Skiing

World Cup career
- Seasons: 2009–2016

Annelies Cook (born August 1, 1984) is a former American biathlete who has been a member of the national team since 2009.

== Career ==
Cook is originally from Saranac Lake, New York She raced for the Maine Winter Sports Center. She then earned a bachelor's degree in international studies at the University of Utah.

At the 2013 Biathlon World Championships, Cook finished 38th in the women's 15km individual race, tied for 45th in the 7.5km sprint, and 51st in the 10km pursuit. She was also on the American mixed relay team that placed 8th at the 2013 World Championships. She was a member of the 2014 Winter Olympics team.

After her career as a competitive athlete, Annelies Cook began training at the School of Nursing at the Asklepios Stadtklinik in Bad Tölz, which she left in 2019 as a qualified health and nursing professional.
