= Nursing in Germany =

Nursing in Germany is provided by different levels of professional and specialized practitioners. German-registered nurses are called Gesundheits- und Krankenpfleger (health- and sickness carer). Previously, the official name for a nurse practicing in Germany was Krankenschwester (female) and Krankenpfleger (male).

== Education ==
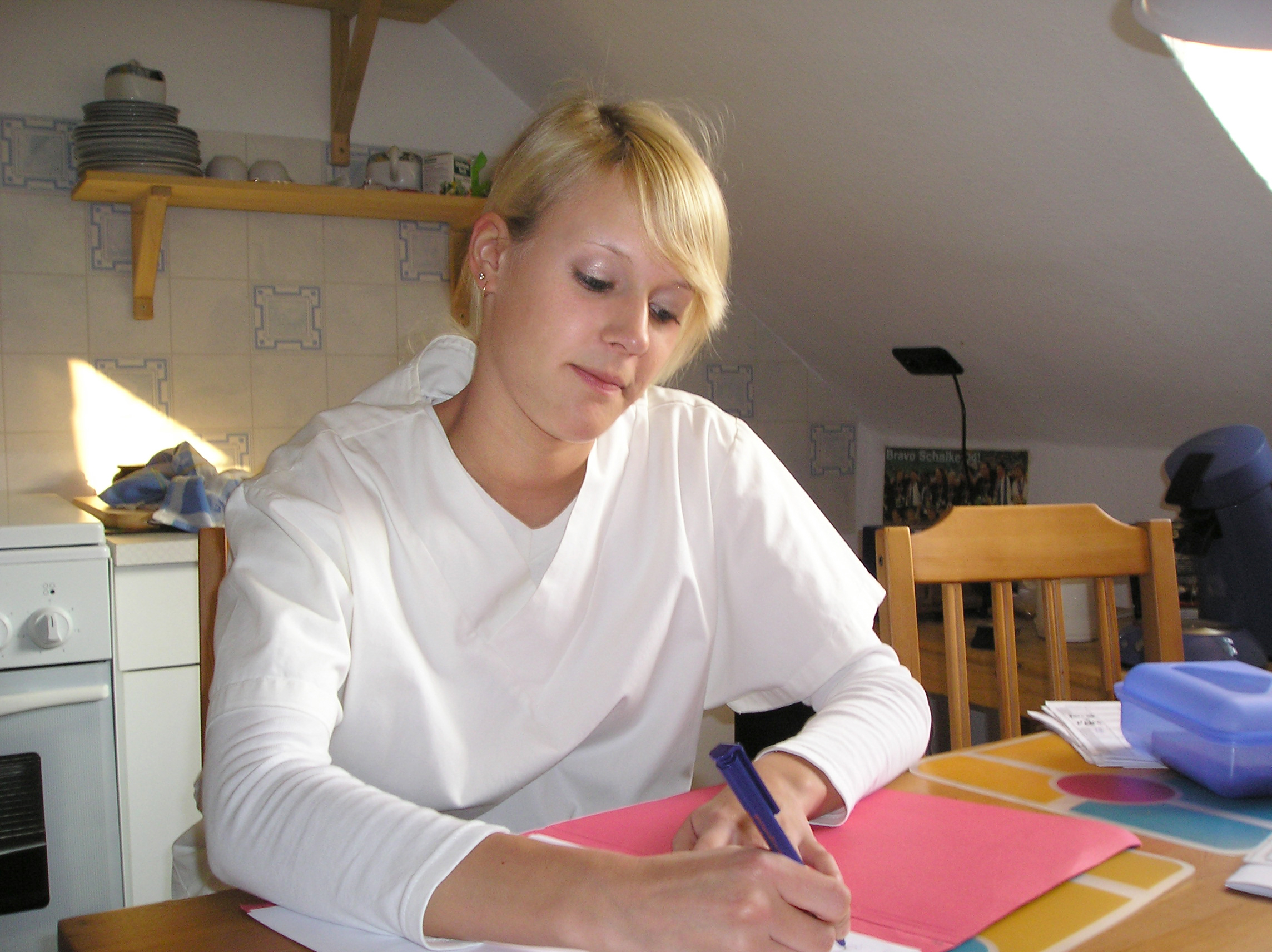
A German nurse

Studying for nursing roles in Germany is often focused on vocational training. In most cases, nurses learn the profession in a special nursing school that is often connected to a hospital whilst working, although formalised qualifications as a route into nursing have become more common.

=== Pre-registration ===
Before matriculating, individuals are required to complete several weeks of practical training in a hospital setting. The nursing course is completed according to EU regulations, and is three years long, including around 2100 hours for theoretical knowledge and 2500 hours of practical training in different hospital settings.

=== Registration ===
To become registered as a nurse, an individual needs to take and pass an official state exam in nursing. Different departments (in [Baden-Württemberg] f.i. the Regierungspräsidium) are responsible for registration in different locations of the country.

== Salary ==
In the first year of education, nurses are paid about 900-1000 Euro per month. In the second year of education, nurses are paid about 1100-1200 Euro per month. In the third and last year of education, nurses are paid about 1300-1400 Euro per month.

There are some changes to be expected in the future as it is now possible to study nursing on a B.Sc. basis (mostly in universities of applied sciences). But individuals still need to pass the official state exam to become a registered nurse. Some universities offer a special program with local nursing schools wherein students earn the B.Sc. and accordant state registration. Some universities offer post-graduate studies leading to a master's degree and the possibility to continue studies for a Ph.D. degree.

There are also nursing helpers who attend a one-year program in nursing school. This may change again with the introduction of university nursing curricula.

== Specializing ==
There are different ways to specialize after the nursing schools, called Fachweiterbildung. Salaries are typically higher with a Fachweiterbildung. Specialization includes some 720–800 hours (1 to 2 years) of theoretical education and practical training. In the end, there is a state exam and often writing of a thesis too. There are official specializations in :

- ICU and anesthesia
- Emergencyroom (“Notfallpflege”)
- OR
- oncology
- psychiatric

These specialist training last 2 years. There are also some trainings that lasts only one year.

- palliative care
- Bedside Trainer for Trainees (“Praxisanleiter”)
- woundcaremanager
- dialysis nurse
- heartfailure nurse
- pain nurse

It is even possible for nurses to study after the stat exams and become a physician assistant, an advanced nurse practitioner, or a ward manager.

== Working as a nurse ==
In hospitals, there are mostly working registered nurses and nursing students. Registered nurses in Germany take care of the patients and there are different systems who and how the patients are treated: (a) taking care of a set of patients including all work that needs to be done or (b) taking care of the patients on a ward doing just one special function. Work includes planning based on the patients' needs and condition, documenting, writing about the progress and current condition. Preparation of medication is in the hands of nurses and its application: tablets, infusion, injections, etc. but the i.v. application by syringe, excluding flushing with Normal Saline, is only allowed to some nurses (in the ICU/IMC, the OR, the ER, the endoscopy, the oncology)and in case of CPR. Blood samples and setup for IV-Catheters are mostly not done by nurses. It belongs to the ward. In the ICU and some other special wards like the oncology, the endoscopy, the anesthesia, nurses also set up. All basic care is done by registered nurses or coordinated and done by the nursing students. Special care like setting up urine catheters, nasogastric tubes, treatment of wounds and wound dressings are done by registered nurses or nurse students under supervision.

== Job satisfaction ==
Job satisfaction is not the best in Germany because of the heavy work-load, low salaries and a low appreciation of the nurse profession in the public. Even some politicians in the past claimed that everybody is able to nurse. The nurse associations are working hard to achieve the acceptance for the installation of nursing chairs in universities but they are often undermined by politicians who are looking for the cheapest work force but not skilled and professional workers.

== UK nurses wanting to work in Germany ==
In Germany, all nurses who want to work in their nursing profession have to have their qualification recognized by applying for an "Anerkennung". This is through the official administrative body responsible for licensing health care professionals which varies from state to state. Requirements include: language proficiency of level B2 in German, registration with the Nursing Midwifery Council (NMC), evidence of nursing education (including an academic transcript and degree certificate which may need to be translated into German), evidence of current residence, evidence of allowance to work in the EU, and evidence that your Nursing education meets the "EU Berufsanerkennungsrichtlinie/2005/36/EG" standards.

== See also ==
- German Nurses Association
