= Fanny Horn Birkeland =

Norwegian biathlete (born 1988)

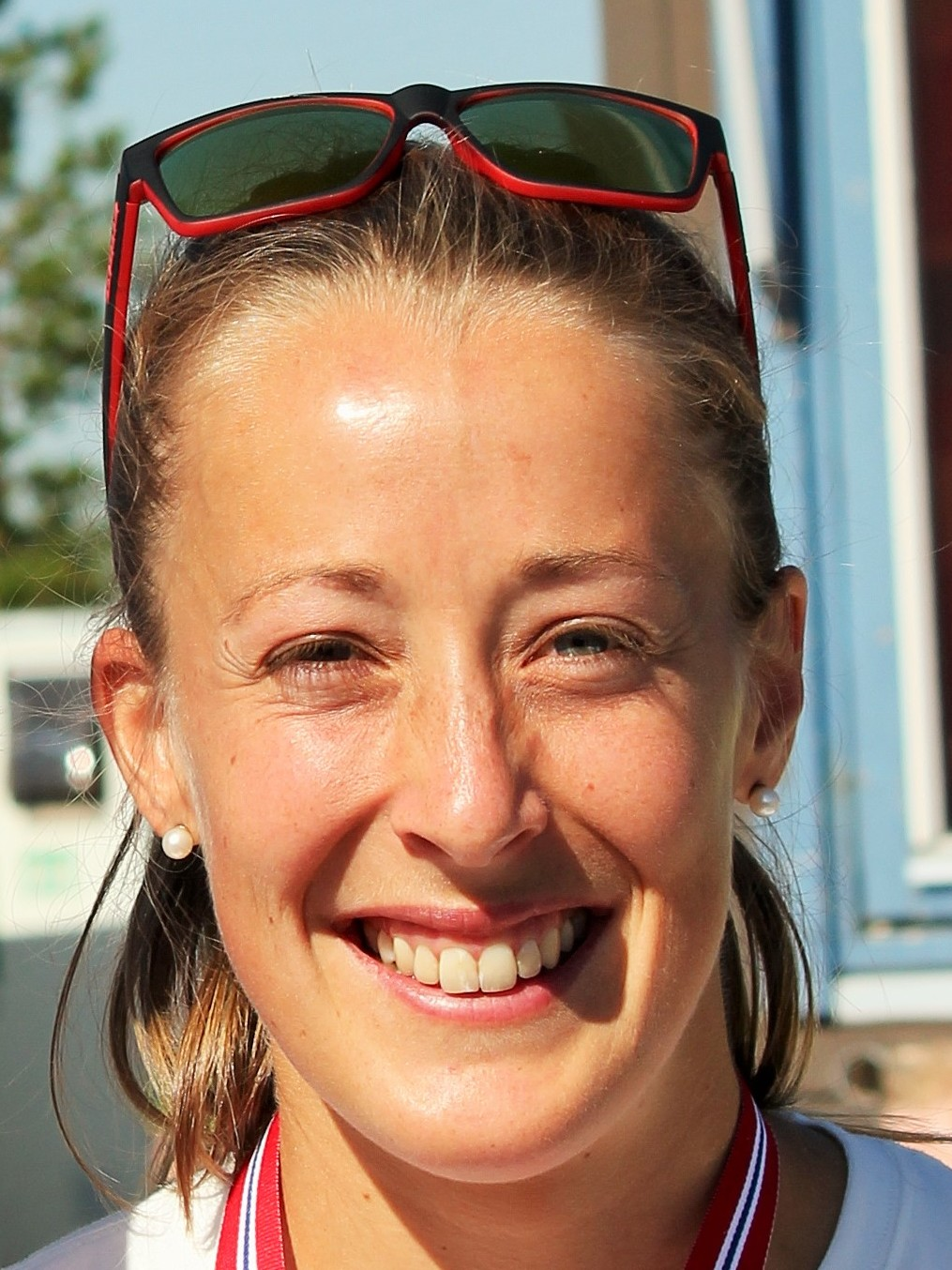

Medal record

Women's biathlon

Representing Norway

Olympic Games
Silver medal – second place	2014 Sochi	4 × 6 km relay

World Championships
Gold medal – first place	2016 Oslo	4 × 6 km relay
Bronze medal – third place	2012 Ruhpolding	4 × 6 km relay
Bronze medal – third place	2015 Kontiolahti	Mixed relay

Fanny Welle-Strand Horn Birkeland (née Horn; born 8 March 1988) is a Norwegian former biathlete. She competed at the Biathlon World Championships 2011, where she placed sixth in the relay with the Norwegian team. In January 2015, she won her first race in the 7.5 km sprint in Ruhpolding, Germany.
