= Marija Kaznačenko =

Lithuanian biathlete (born 1993)

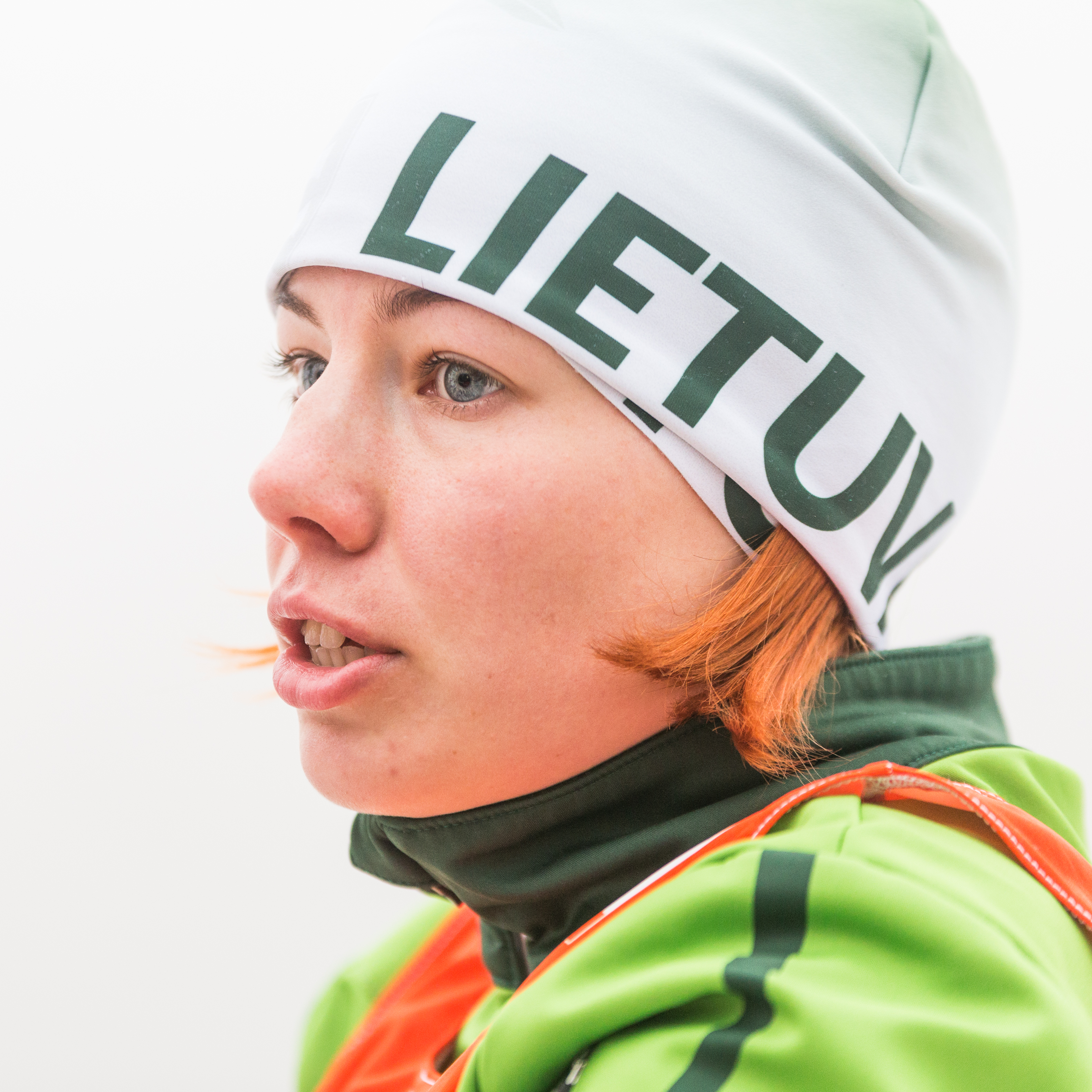
- Marija Kaznačenko in 2018

Personal information
- Nationality: Lithuanian
- Born: 1 December 1993 (age 31); Visaginas, Lithuania

Sport
- Country: Lithuania
- Sport: Biathlon

Marija Kaznačenko (born 1 December 1993 in Visaginas, Lithuania) is a Lithuanian biathlete. She competed in the 2014/15 World Cup seasons, and represented Lithuania at the Biathlon World Championships 2015 in Kontiolahti.
