= Sanna Laari =

Finnish biathlete

Personal information
- Birth name: Sanna Markkanen
- Nationality: Finnish
- Born: 14 April 1990 (age 34)

Sport
- Country: Finland
- Sport: Biathlon

Sanna Laari (née Markkanen; born 14 April 1990) is a Finnish biathlete. She competed in the 2013/14 and 2014/15 World Cup seasons, and represented Finland at the Biathlon World Championships 2015 in Kontiolahti.
