= Marie Dorin Habert =

French biathlete (born 1986)

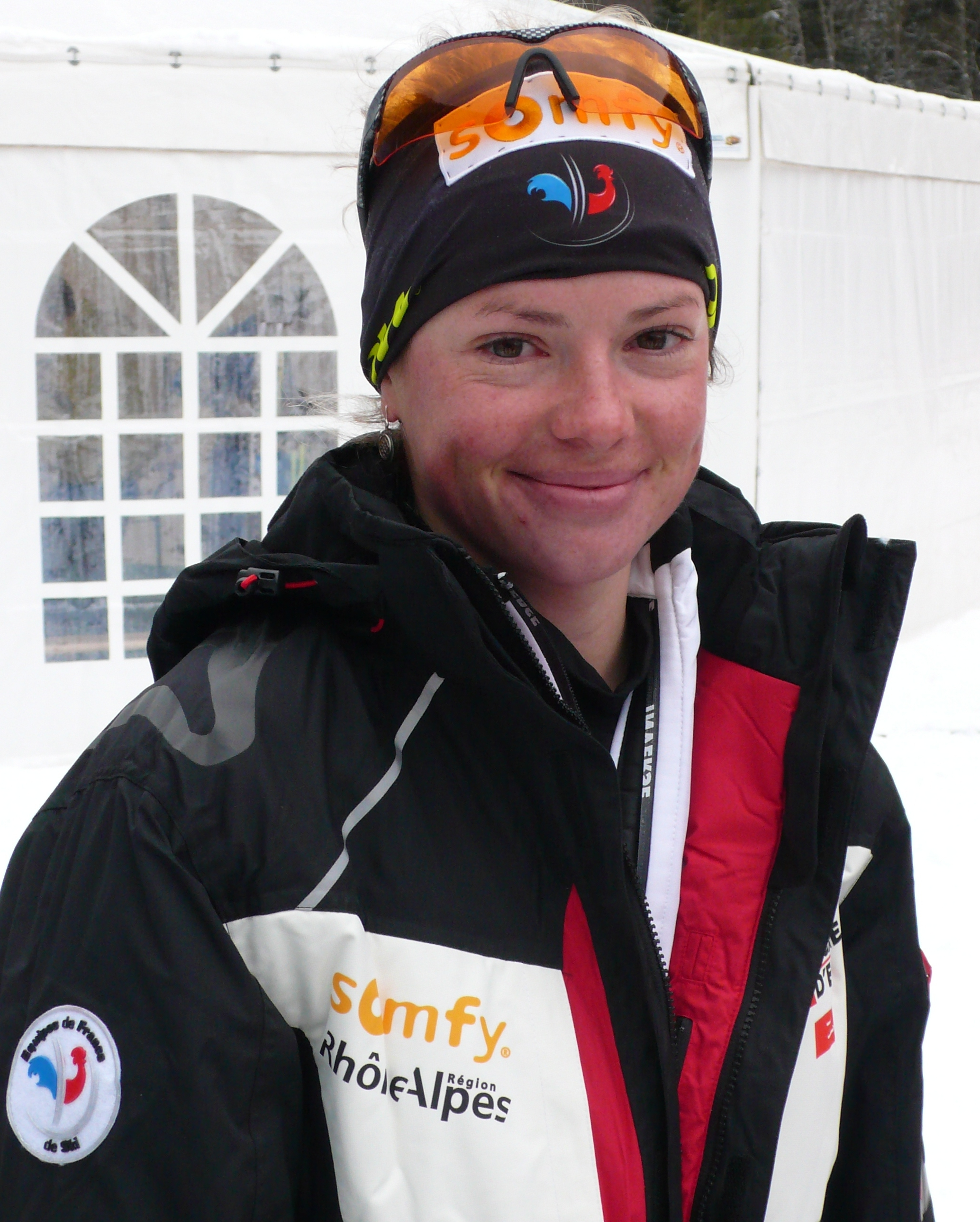

Personal information
- Born: 19 June 1986 (age 40) Lyon, France
- Height: 1.68 m (5 ft 6 in)

Sport

Professional information
- Sport: Biathlon
- Club: Douanes-Sept Laux
- World Cup debut: 29 November 2007

Olympic Games
- Teams: 3 (2010, 2014, 2018)
- Medals: 4 (1 gold)

World Championships
- Teams: 7 (2009, 2011, 2012, 2013, 2015, 2016, 2017)
- Medals: 17 (5 gold)

World Cup
- Seasons: 11 (2007–2018)
- Individual victories: 7
- All victories: 15
- Individual podiums: 26
- All podiums: 53
Medal record
Olympic Games
| Gold medal – first place | 2018 Pyeongchang | Mixed relay |
| Silver medal – second place | 2010 Vancouver | 4 × 6 km relay |
| Bronze medal – third place | 2010 Vancouver | 7.5 km sprint |
| Bronze medal – third place | 2018 Pyeongchang | 4 × 6 km relay |
World Championships
| Gold medal – first place | 2015 Kontiolahti | 7.5 km sprint |
| Gold medal – first place | 2015 Kontiolahti | 10 km pursuit |
| Gold medal – first place | 2016 Oslo | 15 km individual |
| Gold medal – first place | 2016 Oslo | 12.5 km mass start |
| Gold medal – first place | 2016 Oslo | Mixed relay |
| Silver medal – second place | 2011 Khanty-Mansiysk | 4 × 6 km relay |
| Silver medal – second place | 2012 Ruhpolding | 4 × 6 km relay |
| Silver medal – second place | 2013 Nové Město | Mixed relay |
| Silver medal – second place | 2015 Kontiolahti | Mixed relay |
| Silver medal – second place | 2015 Kontiolahti | 4 × 6 km relay |
| Silver medal – second place | 2016 Oslo | 7.5 km sprint |
| Silver medal – second place | 2016 Oslo | 4 × 6 km relay |
| Silver medal – second place | 2017 Hochfilzen | Mixed relay |
| Bronze medal – third place | 2009 Pyeongchang | 4 × 6 km relay |
| Bronze medal – third place | 2011 Khanty-Mansiysk | Mixed relay |
| Bronze medal – third place | 2016 Oslo | 10 km pursuit |
| Bronze medal – third place | 2017 Hochfilzen | 4 x 6 km relay |
Junior World Championships
| Silver medal – second place | 2006 Presque Isle | 3 × 6 km relay |
Youth World Championships
| Gold medal – first place | 2004 Haute Maurienne | 3 × 6 km relay |
| Gold medal – first place | 2005 Kontiolahti | 3 × 6 km relay |
| Bronze medal – third place | 2005 Kontiolahti | 10 km individual |

Marie Dorin Habert (French pronunciation: [maʁi dɔʁɛ̃ abɛʁ]; born 19 June 1986) is a French retired biathlete.

== Career ==
She became junior world champion in relay (2004 and 2005).

She represented France at the 2010 Winter Olympics. She was also on the bronze medal-winning French relay team at the Biathlon World Championships 2009.

Dorin won a bronze in the women's 7.5 km sprint on 13 February 2010 and a silver in the relay. She won her first individual world cup victory at the 2015 world championships in Kontiolahti, Finland, in the sprint event, which was her first World Champion title as well. The next day she won the world championships pursuit, making it her second individual world cup victory and second gold medal in the world championships.

At the Pyeongchang 2018 Winter Olympics, she claimed gold with the French Team in the Mixed relay and took bronze in the Relay.

After the Olympics, she decided to end her career at the World Cup in Oslo.

She won her last women's relay with the French team on 17 March 2018 and ended her career with a 20th place in pursuit the next day.

== Personal life ==
Dorin is married to retired French biathlete Lois Habert. She gave birth to their daughter Adele in September 2014 and returned to the Biathlon World Cup in January 2015. She had a second daughter Evie in January 2019.

== Biathlon results ==
All results are sourced from the International Biathlon Union.

=== Olympic Games ===
4 medals (1 gold, 1 silver, 2 bronze)

| Event | Individual | Sprint | Pursuit | Mass start | Relay | Mixed relay |
|---|---|---|---|---|---|---|
| (Canada) 2010 Vancouver | 51st | Bronze | 17th | 16th | Silver | —N/a |
| (Russia) 2014 Sochi | 39th | 20th | 14th | — | DNF | 6th |
| (South Korea) 2018 Pyeongchang | — | 4th | 27th | 9th | Bronze | Gold |

*The mixed relay was added as an event in 2014.

=== World Championships ===
17 medals (5 gold, 8 silver, 4 bronze)

| Event | Sprint | Pursuit | Individual | Mass start | Relay | Mixed relay |
|---|---|---|---|---|---|---|
| (South Korea) 2009 Pyeongchang | 33rd | 42nd | 18th | — | Bronze | — |
| (Russia) 2011 Khanty-Mansiysk | 6th | 8th | 15th | 8th | Silver | Bronze |
| (Germany) 2012 Rupholding | 4th | 9th | 9th | 6th | Silver | 11th |
| (Czech Republic) 2013 Nové Město | 9th | 18th | 16th | 9th | 6th | Silver |
| (Finland) 2015 Kontiolahti | Gold | Gold | — | 8th | Silver | Silver |
| (Norway) 2016 Oslo | Silver | Bronze | Gold | Gold | Silver | Gold |
| (Austria) 2017 Hochfiltzen | 7th | 6th | 40th | 7th | Bronze | Silver |

=== World Cup ===
| Season | Overall | | Individual | | Sprint | | Pursuit | | Mass start | |
| Season | Points | Position | Points | Position | Points | Position | Points | Position | Points | Position |
|---|---|---|---|---|---|---|---|---|---|---|
| 2007–08 | 0 | —N/a | 0 | —N/a | 0 | —N/a | 0 | —N/a | 0 | —N/a |
| 2008–09 | 314 | 28th | 22 | 53rd | 103 | 31st | 136 | 17th | 51 | 30th |
| 2009–10 | 492 | 17th | 43 | 35th | 219 | 14th | 111 | 19th | 98 | 19th |
| 2010–11 | 726 | 7th | 110 | 10th | 265 | 10th | 211 | 7th | 140 | 9th |
| 2011–12 | 749 | 9th | 107 | 7th | 234 | 13th | 246 | 9th | 172 | 8th |
| 2012–13 | 843 | 4th | 84 | 11th | 325 | 4th | 277 | 3rd | 175 | 4th |
| 2013–14 | 216 | 35th | — | — | 75 | 44th | 93 | 32nd | 48 | 24th |
| 2014–15 | 526 | 15th | 26 | 39th | 233 | 11th | 155 | 13th | 112 | 16th |
| 2015–16 | 1028 | 2nd | 152 | 2nd | 336 | 2nd | 331 | 3rd | 236 | 2nd |
| 2016–17 | 856 | 4th | 66 | 13th | 297 | 4th | 346 | 4th | 147 | 6th |
| 2017–18 | 285 | 26th | — | — | 118 | 19th | 129 | 15th | 41 | 30th |

=== Individual victories ===
7 victories (3 Sp, 2 Pu, 1 In, 1 MS)

| No. | Season | Date | Event | Competition | Level |
|---|---|---|---|---|---|
| 1 | 2014/15 | 7 March 2015 | (Finland) Kontiolahti | 7.5 km Sprint | World Championships |
| 2 | 2014/15 | 8 March 2015 | (Finland) Kontiolahti | 10 km Pursuit | World Championships |
| 3 | 2015/16 | 18 December 2015 | (Slovenia) Pokljuka | 7.5 km Sprint | World Cup |
| 4 | 2015/16 | 9 March 2016 | (Norway) Oslo | 15 km Individual | World Championships |
| 5 | 2015/16 | 13 March 2016 | (Norway) Oslo | 12.5 km Mass Start | World Championships |
| 6 | 2016/17 | 3 December 2016 | (Sweden) Östersund | 7.5 km Sprint | World Cup |
| 7 | 2016/17 | 7 January 2017 | (Germany) Oberhof | 10 km Pursuit | World Cup |

=== Relay victories ===
8 victories (Victories at Winter Olympics are not counted as World Cup victories, but are listed here. )

| No. | Season | Date | Location | Discipline | Level | Team |
|---|---|---|---|---|---|---|
| 1 | 2011–12 | 21 January 2012 | (Italy) Antholz-Anterselva | Relay | Biathlon World Cup | Brunet / Boilley / Bescond / Dorin Habert |
| 2 | 2015–16 | 24 January 2016 | (Italy) Antholz-Anterselva | Relay | Biathlon World Cup | Braisaz / Bescond / Chevalier / Dorin Habert |
| 3 | 2015–16 | 7 February 2016 | (Canada) Canmore | Single Mixed Relay | Biathlon World Cup | Dorin Habert / Fourcade |
| 4 | 2015–16 | 3 March 2016 | (Norway) Oslo Holmenkollen | Mixed Relay | Biathlon World Championships | Bescond / Dorin Habert / Fillon Maillet / Fourcade |
| 5 | 2016–17 | 27 November 2016 | (Sweden) Östersund | Single Mixed Relay | Biathlon World Cup | Dorin Habert / Fourcade |
| 6 | 2016–17 | 12 March 2017 | (Finland) Kontiolahti | Mixed Relay | Biathlon World Cup | Dorin Habert / Bescond / Desthieux / Fillon Maillet |
| 7 | 2017–18 | 20 February 2018 | (South Korea) Pyeongchang | Mixed Relay | Winter Olympic Games | Dorin Habert / Bescond / Desthieux / Fourcade |
| 8 | 2017–18 | 17 March 2018 | (Norway) Oslo Holmenkollen | Relay | Biathlon World Cup | Chevalier / Aymonier / Dorin Habert / Bescond |
