= Weronika Nowakowska =

Polish biathlete (born 1986)

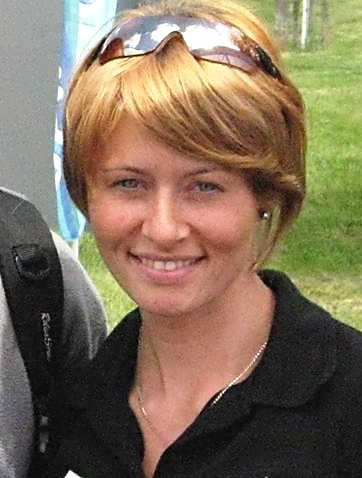

Personal information
- Born: 7 July 1986 (age 40) Kłodzko, Poland
- Occupation: Teacher

Sport

Professional information
- Sport: Biathlon
- Club: AZS AWF Katowice
- Skis: Fischer
- Rifle: Anschutz
- World Cup debut: 7 December 2007

Olympic Games
- Teams: 3 (2010, 2014, 2018)
- Medals: 0 (0 gold)

World Championships
- Teams: 7 (2008, 2009, 2010, 2012, 2013, 2015, 2016)
- Medals: 2 (0 gold)

World Cup
- Seasons: 10 (2007/08–)
- Individual races: 186
- All races: 224
- Individual podiums: 0
- All podiums: 1
Medal record
Women's biathlon
Representing Poland
World Championships
Silver medal – second place	2015 Kontiolahti	7.5 km sprint
Bronze medal – third place	2015 Kontiolahti	10 km pursuit
European Championships
Silver medal – second place	2015 Otepää	7.5 km sprint
Bronze medal – third place	2012 Osrblie	7.5 km sprint
Universiade
Gold medal – first place	2013 Trentino	Sprint
Gold medal – first place	2013 Trentino	Pursuit
Silver medal – second place	2013 Trentino	Individual
Silver medal – second place	2013 Trentino	Mass start
- Updated on 22 March 2018

Weronika Nowakowska (born 7 July 1986) is a Polish biathlete.

== Career ==
Nowakowska competed in the 2010 Winter Olympics for Poland. Her best performance was 5th in the individual, missing only one shot. Had she shot clear, her time would have placed her 2nd. She also finished 21st in the mass start, 36th in the sprint, 28th in the pursuit and 12th as part of the relay team.

As of February 2013, her best performance at the Biathlon World Championships, is 6th, as part of the 2009 Polish women's relay team. Her best individual performance is 9th, in the 2012 mass start.

As of February 2013, Nowakowska has finished on the podium once in the Biathlon World Cup, winning a bronze as part of the Polish women's relay team in Hochfilzen during the 2008/09 season. Her best individual performance is 7th, achieved twice in sprint races. Her best overall finish in the Biathlon World Cup is 24th, in 2011/12.

== Biathlon results ==
All results are sourced from the International Biathlon Union.

=== Olympic Games ===
0 medals

Event	Individual	Sprint	Pursuit	Mass start	Relay	Mixed relay
Representing Poland
(Canada) 2010 Vancouver	5th	36th	28th	21st	12th	—N/a
(Russia) 2014 Sochi	31st	7th	20th	19th	10th	—
(South Korea) 2018 Pyeongchang	21st	34th	30th	—	7th	—

*The mixed relay was added as an event in 2014.

=== World Championships ===
2 medals (1 silver, 1 bronze)

Event	Individual	Sprint	Pursuit	Mass start	Relay	Mixed relay
Representing Poland
(Sweden) 2008 Östersund	—	58th	55th	—	—	—
(South Korea) 2009 Pyeongchang	36th	35th	16th	—	6th	8th
(Russia) 2010 Khanty-Mansiysk	—N/a	—N/a	—N/a	—N/a	—N/a	15th
(Germany) 2012 Ruhpolding	21st	20th	17th	9th	9th	13th
(Czech Republic) 2013 Nové Město	23rd	34th	27th	12th	9th	—
(Finland) 2015 Kontiolahti	13th	Silver	Bronze	23rd	13th	—
(Norway) 2016 Holmenkollen	41st	75th	—	—	4th	20th

*During Olympic seasons competitions are only held for those events not included in the Olympic program.

=== World Cup podiums ===
Season	Location	Event	Rank
2008/09	Hochfilzen	Relay	3rd place, bronze medalist(s)
2014/15	Kontiolahti	Sprint	2nd place, silver medalist(s)
2014/15	Kontiolahti	Pursuit	3rd place, bronze medalist(s)
