= Krystyna Guzik =

Polish biathlete (born 1983)

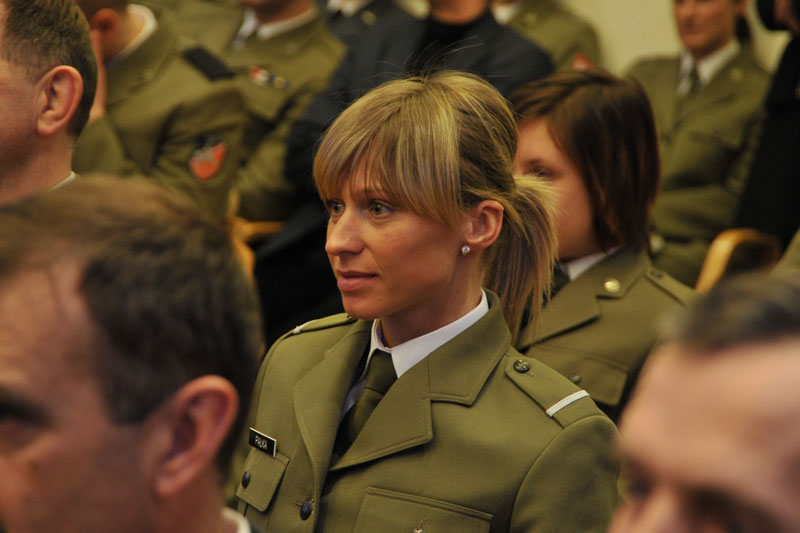

Medal record

Women's Biathlon

Representing Poland

World Championships
Silver medal – second place	2013 Nové Město	Pursuit

European Championships
Bronze medal – third place	2017 Duszniki-Zdrój	single mixed relay

Krystyna Guzik (née Pałka; born 16 August 1983) is a Polish biathlete. She was born in Zakopane. She represented Poland at the 2006 Winter Olympics, 2010 Winter Olympics and 2014 Winter Olympics. Her best result at the Olympics was a tenth place in the 15 km individual event at the 2014 Games in Sochi. At the 2013 World Championships she won the silver medal in pursuit.

In July 2014, Guzik married fellow biathlete Grzegorz Guzik.

== World Cup podiums ==
Season	Location	Event	Rank
2008/09	Hochfilzen	Relay	3rd place, bronze medalist(s)
2012/13	Nové Město	Pursuit	2nd place, silver medalist(s)
2013/14	Hochfilzen	Pursuit	3rd place, bronze medalist(s)
2015/16	Canmore	Sprint	2nd place, silver medalist(s)
2015/16	Presque Isle	Sprint	3rd place, bronze medalist(s)

== Record ==
=== Olympic Games ===
0 medals

Event	Individual	Sprint	Pursuit	Mass Start	Relay	Mixed Relay
(Italy) 2006 Turin	5th	25th	37th	30th	7th	—
(Canada) 2010 Vancouver	15h	21st	24th	20th	12th	—
(Russia) 2014 Sochi	10th	33rd	34th	18th	10th	14th
(South Korea) 2018 Pyeongchang	52nd	28th	36th	–	7th	–

=== World Championships ===
1 medal (1 silver)

Event	Individual	Sprint	Pursuit	Mass Start	Relay	Mixed Relay
(Germany) 2004 Oberhof	46th	DSQ	–	–	8th	—
(Austria) 2005 Hochfilzen	20th	24th	27th	28th	12th	—
(Russia) 2005 Chanty-Mansyjsk	—	—	—	—	—	8th
(Slovenia) 2006 Pokljuka	—	—	—	—	—	8th
(Italy) 2007 Antholz	25th	34th	21st	17th	10th	11th
(Sweden) 2008 Östersund	21st	54th	50th	–	7th	6th
(South Korea) 2009 PyeongChang	–	57th	45th	–	6th	–
(Russia) 2011 Khanty-Mansiysk	–	–	–	–	–	–
(Germany) 2012 Rupholding	65th	21st	27th	25th	9th	13th
(Czech Republic) 2013 Nové Město na Moravě	22nd	7th	Silver	7th	9th	10th
(Finland) 2015 Kontiolahti	14th	5th	8th	17th	13th	–
(Norway) 2016 Oslo	7th	60th	DNS	19th	4th	20th
(Austria) 2017 Hochfilzen	52nd	53rd	47th	–	7th	–
