= Mari Eder =

Finnish cross-country skier

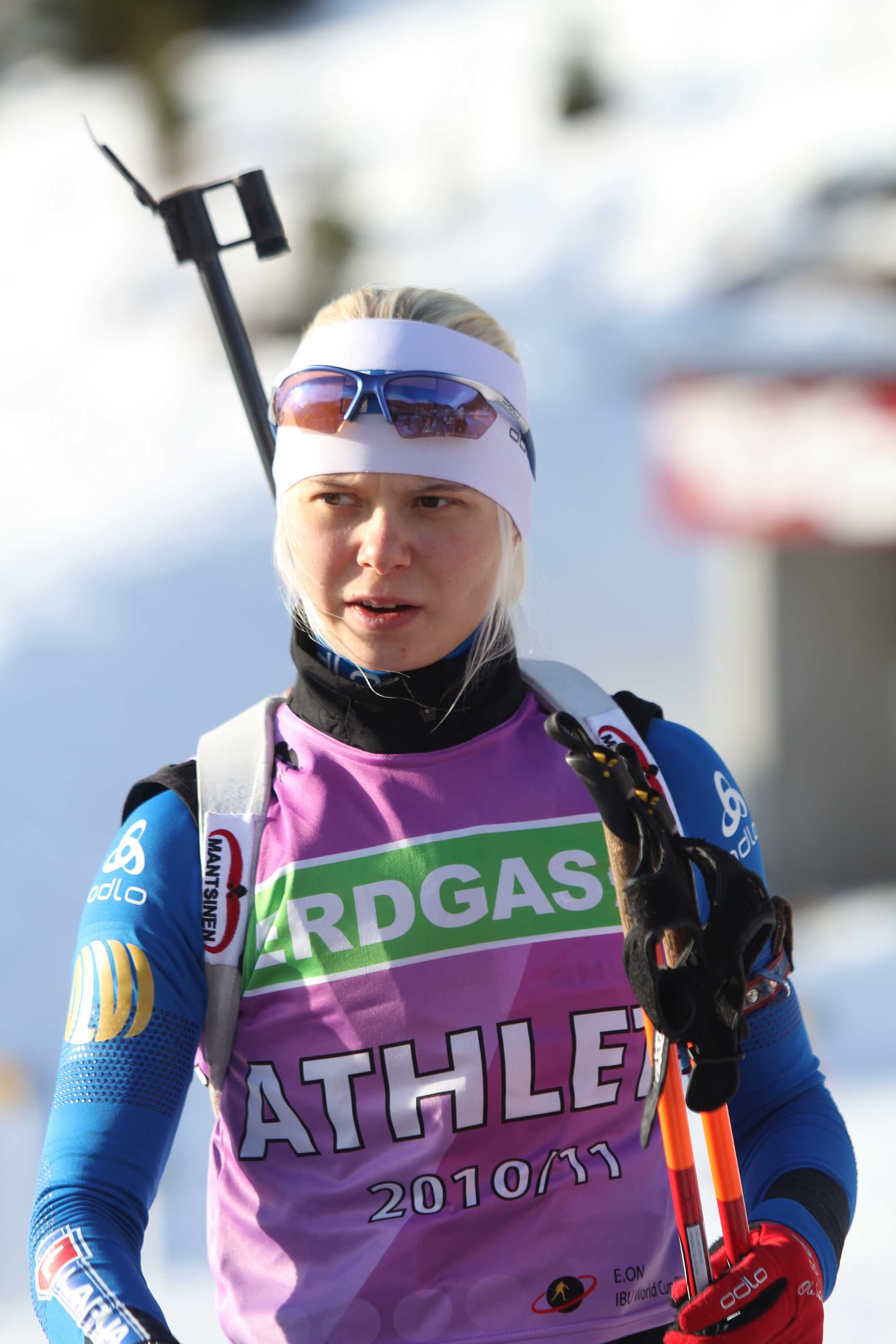
- Mari Eder at the Biathon World Cup 2010 in Hochfilzen, Austria

Personal information
- Born: 9 November 1987 (age 38) Eno, Finland

Sport
- Sport: Skiing
- Club: Enon Kisa-Pojat

World Cup career
- Indiv. podiums: 3
- Indiv. wins: 2
Medal record
Representing Finland
Women's cross-country skiing
U23 World Championships
Gold medal – first place	2010 Hinterzarten	Individual sprint
Silver medal – second place	2009 Praz de Lys-Sommand	Individual sprint
Bronze medal – third place	2008 Mals	Individual sprint
Junior World Championships
Bronze medal – third place	2007 Tarvisio	4 × 3.33 km relay
- Updated on 28 February 2013

Mari Eder (née Laukkanen; born 9 November 1987) is a Finnish former biathlete and cross-country skier.

== Career ==
Eder competed in the 2010 Winter Olympics for Finland. Her best performance was 43rd in the individual. She also finished 68th in the sprint.

In February 2013, Eder's best performance in the Biathlon World Cup was 7th, as part of the mixed relay team at Kontiolahti in 2011/12. Her best overall finish in the Biathlon World Cup is 36th, in 2011/12. She scored her first World Cup podium finish with a third place in the first of two sprints at the Kontiolahti round of the 2013/14 season.

Up to February 2017, her best performance at the Biathlon World Championships was fourth at Hochfilzen, in Austria, in 2017, in the women's individual competition over the normal distance. Her previous best was sixth, as part of the 2009 Finnish mixed relay team. Her previous best individual performance was 15th in the 2012 sprint. However, in March 2017, she won both the 7.5 km sprint and 10 km pursuit in Holmenkollen.

In addition to biathlon, Eder has competed in cross-country skiing, mostly in sprints and other short races. She enjoyed particular success at the Under-23 level, finishing on the podium in the individual sprint at the Under-23 World Championships three times, taking third in the 2008 Championships in Malles Venosta, second in the 2009 event at Praz de Lys-Sommand, and taking the gold medal in 2010 in Hinterzarten. In the FIS Cross-Country World Cup, her best results have been fifth place in the individual sprint in Sochi in February 2013, and in the team sprint in Toblach in January 2017. She competed in the cross-country sprint at the 2014 Winter Olympics in Sochi, where she placed 15th.

She retired at the end of the 2022/23 season.

== Biathlon results ==
All results are sourced from the International Biathlon Union.

=== Olympic Games ===
0 medals

Event	Individual	Sprint	Pursuit	Mass start	Relay	Mixed relay^{[a]}
(Canada) 2010 Vancouver	43rd	68th	—	—	—	—N/a
(Russia) 2014 Sochi	DNS	36th	DNS	—	—	—
(South Korea) 2018 Pyeongchang	42nd	64th	DNS	—	—	—
(China) 2022 Beijing	32nd	28th	30th	—	16th	11th

a. ^{1} The mixed relay was added as an event in 2014.

=== World Championships ===
0 medals

Event	Individual	Sprint	Pursuit	Mass start	Relay	Mixed relay	Single mixed relay
(Italy) 2007 Antholz	—	43rd	LAP	—	12th	16th	—N/a
(Sweden) 2008 Östersund	47th	34th	33rd	—	15th	10th	—N/a
(South Korea) 2009 Pyeongchang	—	55th	47th	—	—	6th	—N/a
(Russia) 2010 Khanty-Mansiysk^{[a]}	—N/a	—N/a	—N/a	—N/a	—N/a	17th	—N/a
(Russia) 2011 Khanty-Mansiysk	40th	28th	LAP	—	10th	9th	—N/a
(Germany) 2012 Ruhpolding	60th	15th	25th	27th	18th	16th	—N/a
(Czech Republic) 2013 Nové Město	63rd	60th	46th	—	21st	18th	—N/a
(Finland) 2015 Kontiolahti	65th	16th	29th	—	16th	9th	—N/a
(Norway) 2016 Oslo	—	52nd	45th	—	—	18th	—N/a
(Austria) 2017 Hochfilzen	4th	57th	DNS	—	15th	10th	—N/a
(Italy) 2020 Antholz	67th	68th	—	—	11th	9th	23rd
(Slovenia) 2021 Pokljuka	44th	56th	31st	—	14th	13th	25th
(Germany) 2023 Oberhof	62nd	69th	—	—	13th	11th	—

a. ^{1} ^{2} During Olympic seasons "Mixed-Relay Championships" were held for those events not included in the Olympic program.
b. The single mixed relay was added as an event in 2019.

=== Individual podiums ===
- 2 victories – (1 Sp, 1 Pu)
- 3 podiums – (2 Sp, 1 Pu)

No.	Season	Date	Location	Level	Race	Place
1	2013–14	13 March 2014	(Finland) Kontiolahti	World Cup	Sprint	3rd
2	2016–17	17 March 2017	(Norway) Oslo	World Cup	Sprint	1st
3	2016–17	18 March 2017	(Norway) Oslo	World Cup	Pursuit	1st

== Cross-country skiing results ==
All results are sourced from the International Ski Federation (FIS).

=== Olympic Games ===
Year	Age	10 km individual	15 km skiathlon	30 km mass start	Sprint	4 × 5 km relay	Team sprint
2014	26	—	—	—	15	—	—
2018	30	—	—	—	—	—	5

=== World Championships ===
Year	Age	10 km individual	15 km skiathlon	30 km mass start	Sprint	4 × 5 km relay	Team sprint
2017	29	—	—	—	8	—	—

=== World Cup ===
==== Season standings ====
Season	Age	Discipline standings			Ski Tour standings		
Season	Age	Overall	Distance	Sprint	Nordic Opening	Tour de Ski	World Cup Final
2008	20	86	—	66	—N/a	—	—
2009	21	109	—	72	—N/a	—	—
2011	23	104	—	73	—	—	—
2013	25	70	—	41	—	—	—
2014	26	81	NC	52	—	—	—
2017	30	86	—	52	—	—	—
2018	30	76	—	47	—	DNF	—
2019	31	NC	—	NC	—	DNF	—

== Personal life ==
Eder married Austrian Benjamin Eder on 26 July 2018. She has been living in Austria since 2013.
