= Biathlon World Championships 2011 – Women's pursuit =

Women's pursuit at the Biathlon World Championships 2011
- Location: Khanty-Mansiysk, Russia
- Date: 6 March
- Competitors: 60 from 23 nations
- Winning time: 30:00.1

Medalists
gold medal	Kaisa Mäkäräinen	Finland
silver medal	Magdalena Neuner	Germany
bronze medal	Helena Ekholm	Sweden

The women's pursuit competition of the Biathlon World Championships 2011 was held on March 6, 2011 at 16:30 local time. The best 60 athletes from the sprint participated.

== Results ==
Rank	Bib	Name	Country	Start	Penalties (P+P+S+S)	Time	Deficit
1st place, gold medalist(s)	2	Kaisa Mäkäräinen	Finland	0:12	0 (0+0+0+0)	30:00.1	0.0
2nd place, silver medalist(s)	1	Magdalena Neuner	Germany	0:00	2 (0+0+0+2)	30:21.7	+21.6
3rd place, bronze medalist(s)	5	Helena Ekholm	Sweden	1:01	0 (0+0+0+0)	31:43.7	+1:43.6
4	20	Andrea Henkel	Germany	2:01	0 (0+0+0+0)	32:00.8	+2:00.7
5	7	Tora Berger	Norway	1:23	2 (1+0+0+1)	32:29.1	+2:29.0
6	3	Anastasiya Kuzmina	Slovakia	0:40	6 (2+1+0+3)	33:00.0	+2:59.9
7	9	Miriam Gössner	Germany	1:36	4 (0+0+4+0)	33:12.4	+3:12.3
8	17	Jana Gerekova	Slovakia	1:51	3 (0+0+1+2)	33:15.8	+3:15.7
9	28	Dorothea Wierer	Italy	2:32	0 (0+0+0+0)	33:17.3	+3:17.2
10	6	Ekaterina Yurlova	Russia	1:16	3 (1+2+0+0)	33:24.6	+3:24.5
11	21	Anna Bogaliy-Titovets	Russia	2:02	3 (0+0+1+2)	33:26.1	+3:26.0
12	4	Olga Zaitseva	Russia	0:48	6 (1+1+3+1)	33:30.2	+3:30.1
13	11	Anna Carin Zidek	Sweden	1:42	2 (0+2+0+0)	33:37.0	+3:36.9
14	23	Michela Ponza	Italy	2:06	2 (1+0+1+0)	33:46.8	+3:46.7
15	8	Marie Dorin	France	1:32	3 (0+1+2+0)	33:52.1	+3:52.0
16	16	Nadezhda Skardino	Belarus	1:51	1 (0+0+0+1)	33:58.2	+3:58.1
17	18	Vita Semerenko	Ukraine	1:57	5 (2+1+2+0)	34:05.6	+4:05.5
18	31	Olena Pidhrushna	Ukraine	2:47	1 (0+0+1+0)	34:18.1	+4:18.0
19	22	Inna Suprun	Ukraine	2:05	4 (1+1+1+1)	34:21.3	+4:21.2
20	39	Anais Bescond	France	2:59	1 (1+0+0+0)	34:21.5	+4:21.4
21	25	Gabriela Soukalová	Czech Republic	2:10	3 (0+0+1+2)	34:30.5	+4:30.4
22	40	Katja Haller	Italy	3:01	0 (0+0+0+0)	34:42.3	+4:42.2
23	10	Valj Semerenko	Ukraine	1:38	6 (1+3+2+0)	35:02.6	+5:02.5
24	12	Anna Maria Nilsson	Sweden	1:46	5 (1+0+2+2)	35:03.6	+5:03.5
25	27	Kathrin Hitzer	Germany	2:16	4 (1+1+1+1)	35:03.9	+5:03.8
26	13	Agnieszka Cyl	Poland	1:47	5 (1+1+1+2)	35:11.4	+5:11.3
27	15	Éva Tófalvi	Romania	1:50	5 (0+1+2+2)	35:18.2	+5:18.1
28	19	Tadeja Brankovič-Likozar	Slovenia	1:58	5 (1+0+2+2)	35:46.7	+5:46.6
29	33	Ramona Düringer	Austria	2:49	4 (2+0+0+2)	35:53.2	+5:53.1
30	24	Fanny Welle-Strand Horn	Norway	2:07	5 (1+0+3+1)	35:53.5	+5:53.4
31	32	Magdalena Gwizdoń	Poland	2:49	2 (1+0+1+0)	36:07.2	+6:07.1
32	30	Andreja Mali	Slovenia	2:43	3 (0+2+1+0)	36:07.6	+6:07.5
33	56	Veronika Vítková	Czech Republic	3:51	1 (0+0+0+1)	36:13.0	+6:12.9
34	26	Darya Domracheva	Belarus	2:14	8 (1+1+2+4)	36:18.3	+6:18.2
35	45	Anna Karin Strömstedt	Sweden	3:09	7 (2+1+2+2)	36:20.1	+6:20.0
36	51	Ekaterina Vinogradova	Armenia	3:40	2 (0+0+1+1)	36:20.9	+6:20.8
37	48	Sara Studebaker	United States	3:25	4 (1+1+0+2)	37:14.3	+7:14.2
38	35	Sophie Boilley	France	2:55	4 (0+0+2+2)	37:15.0	+7:14.9
39	38	Wang Chunli	China	2:57	3 (0+1+0+2)	37:54.5	+7:54.4
40	36	Marina Lebedeva	Kazakhstan	2:56	5 (0+1+2+2)	38:13.1	+8:13.0
	29	Mari Laukkanen	Finland	2:36	8 (2+2+2+2)	LAP	
	37	Itsuka Owada	Japan	2:56	8 (0+2+2+4)	LAP	
	41	Fuyuko Suzuki	Japan	3:01	1+0+2+	LAP	
	42	Eveli Saue	Estonia	3:02	3+1+2+	LAP	
	43	Synnøve Solemdal	Norway	3:04	4 (1+2+1+0)	LAP	
	46	Emilia Yordanova	Bulgaria	3:18	5 (1+1+1+2)	LAP	
	47	Anastasia Tokareva	Russia	3:21	2+2+0+	LAP	
	50	Liudmila Kalinchik	Belarus	3:34	3 (1+0+1+1)	LAP	
	52	Inna Mozhevitina	Kazakhstan	3:41	3 (0+0+1+2)	LAP	
	53	Laure Soulie	Andorra	3:42	0+1+2+	LAP	
	54	Amanda Lightfoot	United Kingdom	3:46	2+1+0+	LAP	
	57	Annalies Cook	United States	3:55	4 (0+1+1+2)	LAP	
	58	Olga Poltoranina	Kazakhstan	3:58	0+2+0+	LAP	
	59	Sarianna Repo	Finland	3:58	1+0+1+	LAP	
	14	Teja Gregorin	Slovenia	1:49	4 (0+1+2+1)	DSQ	
	34	Ann Kristin Aafedt Flatland	Norway	2:55		DNS	
	44	Marie-Laure Brunet	France	3:08		DNS	
	49	Karin Oberhofer	Italy	3:32		DNS	
	55	Selina Gasparin	Switzerland	3:51		DNS	
	60	Diana Rasimovičiūtė	Lithuania	4:01		DNS	

== See also ==
- 2011 IPC Biathlon and Cross-Country Skiing World Championships – Women's pursuit
