= 2012–13 Biathlon World Cup – Mixed relay =

The 2012–13 Biathlon World Cup – Mixed Relay started on Sunday 25 November 2012 in Östersund, Sweden. It finished in February 2013 in Nové Město, Czech Republic, at Biathlon World Championships 2013 event.

Russia won the gold medal in the biathlon mixed relay in Östersund in 2012, while Norway won its third consecutive gold medal in the discipline at the world championships in Nové Město in 2013.

== Competition format ==
The biathlon event combines cross-country skiing and rifle shooting. The relay teams consisted of four biathletes. Legs 1 and 2 were done by the women, legs 3 and 4 by the men. The women's legs were 6 km each and men's legs are 7.5 km each.

Every athlete leg skied over three laps, with two shooting rounds: one prone, one standing. For every round of five targets there were eight bullets available, though the last three could only be single loaded manually one at a time from spare round holders or bullets deposited by the competitor into trays or onto the mat at the firing line. If after eight bullets there were still misses, one 150 m penalty loop was taken for each missed target remaining.

The first-leg participants started at the same time, and as in cross-country skiing relays, every athlete of a team touched the team's next-leg participant to perform a valid changeover. On the first shooting stage of the first leg, the participant shot in the lane corresponding to their bib number (Bib 10 shot at lane 10 regardless of position in the race), then for the remainder of the relay, the relay team shot at the lane in the position they arrived. If arriving at the range in fifth place, the contestant shot at lane five.

== Medal winners ==
Event:	Gold:	Time	Silver:	Time	Bronze:	Time
Östersund details	Russia; Olga Zaitseva; Olga Vilukhina; Alexey Volkov; Evgeny Ustyugov	1:12:41.3 (0+0) (0+2) (0+1) (0+1) (0+1) (0+1) (0+0) (0+0)	Norway; Tora Berger; Synnøve Solemdal; Erlend Bjøntegaard; Emil Hegle Svendsen	1:13:02.5 (0+0) (0+1) (0+2) (0+1) (0+1) (0+3) (0+0) (0+2)	Czech Republic; Veronika Vítková; Gabriela Soukalová; Michal Šlesingr; Ondřej Moravec	1:13:17.7 (0+2) (0+1) (0+0) (0+2) (0+1) (0+1) (0+0) (0+1)
World Championships 2013 details	Norway; Tora Berger; Synnøve Solemdal; Tarjei Bø; Emil Hegle Svendsen	1:12:04.9 (0+0) (0+0) (0+0) (0+2) (0+1) (0+0) (0+0) (0+1)	France; Marie Laure Brunet; Marie Dorin Habert; Alexis Bœuf; Martin Fourcade	1:12:24.9 (0+0) (0+2) (0+1) (0+2) (0+1) (0+0) (0+0) (0+1)	Czech Republic; Veronika Vítková; Gabriela Soukalová; Jaroslav Soukup; Ondřej Moravec	1:12:37.2 (0+2) (0+1) (0+1) (0+0) (0+0) (0+1) (0+0) (0+0)

== Standings ==
#	Name	ÖST	WCH	Total
1	Norway	54	60	114
2	Russia	60	38	98
3	Czech Republic	48	48	96
4	France	40	54	94
5	Italy	36	43	79
6	Slovenia	38	40	78
7	Germany	43	28	71
8	Slovakia	30	36	66
9	Ukraine	31	32	63
10	Sweden	34	27	61
11	Switzerland	32	29	61
12	Belarus	29	30	59
13	United States	24	34	58
14	Poland	27	31	58
15	Canada	25	26	51
16	Finland	28	22	50
17	Austria	26	24	50
18	Kazakhstan	21	23	44
19	Bulgaria	17	25	42
20	Japan	23	19	42
21	Romania	22	20	42
22	Estonia	20	21	41
23	China	19	18	37
24	Lithuania	18	16	34
25	Latvia	—	17	17
26	United Kingdom	—	15	15
27	South Korea	—	14	14
