= 2017–18 Biathlon World Cup – Overall Women =

In the women's 2017–18 Biathlon World Cup total score, for each participating athlete the points earned in all Individual, Sprint, Pursuit and Mass start competitions held during the season are added up with the two lowest scores subtracted at the end of the season to give that athlete's final score. No points are awarded for the competitions at the 2018 Winter Olympics (held between the World Cup stages in Antholz and Kontiolahti).

== 2016–17 Top 3 standings ==
Medal	Athlete	Points
Gold:	(Germany) Laura Dahlmeier	1211
Silver:	(Czech Republic) Gabriela Koukalová	1089
Bronze:	(Finland) Kaisa Mäkäräinen	971

== Events summary ==
Event	Winner	Second	Third
Östersund 15 km Individual details	Nadezhda Skardino; Belarus	Synnøve Solemdal; Norway	Yuliia Dzhima; Ukraine
Östersund 7.5 km Sprint details	Denise Herrmann; Germany	Justine Braisaz; France	Yuliia Dzhima; Ukraine
Östersund 10 km Pursuit details	Denise Herrmann; Germany	Justine Braisaz; France	Marte Olsbu; Norway
Hochfilzen 7.5 km Sprint details	Darya Domracheva; Belarus	Anastasiya Kuzmina; Slovakia	Dorothea Wierer; Italy
Hochfilzen 10 km Pursuit details	Anastasiya Kuzmina; Slovakia	Kaisa Mäkäräinen; Finland	Darya Domracheva; Belarus
Annecy 7.5 km Sprint details	Anastasiya Kuzmina; Slovakia	Laura Dahlmeier; Germany	Vita Semerenko; Ukraine
Annecy 10 km Pursuit details	Laura Dahlmeier; Germany	Anastasiya Kuzmina; Slovakia	Lisa Vittozzi; Italy
Annecy 12.5 km Mass start details	Justine Braisaz; France	Iryna Kryuko; Belarus	Laura Dahlmeier; Germany
Oberhof 7.5 km Sprint details	Anastasiya Kuzmina; Slovakia	Kaisa Mäkäräinen; Finland	Veronika Vítková; Czech Republic
Oberhof 10 km Pursuit details	Anastasiya Kuzmina; Slovakia	Dorothea Wierer; Italy	Vita Semerenko; Ukraine
Ruhpolding 15 km Individual details	Dorothea Wierer; Italy	Kaisa Mäkäräinen; Finland	Rosanna Crawford; Canada
Ruhpolding 12.5 km Mass start details	Kaisa Mäkäräinen; Finland	Laura Dahlmeier; Germany	Veronika Vítková; Czech Republic
Antholz-Anterselva 7.5 km Sprint details	Tiril Eckhoff; Norway	Laura Dahlmeier; Germany	Veronika Vítková; Czech Republic
Antholz-Anterselva 10 km Pursuit details	Laura Dahlmeier; Germany	Dorothea Wierer; Italy	Darya Domracheva; Belarus
Antholz-Anterselva 12.5 km Mass start details	Darya Domracheva; Belarus	Anastasiya Kuzmina; Slovakia	Kaisa Mäkäräinen; Finland
Kontiolahti 7.5 km Sprint details	Darya Domracheva; Belarus	Franziska Hildebrand; Germany	Lisa Vittozzi; Italy
Kontiolahti 12.5 km Mass start details	Vanessa Hinz; Germany	Lisa Vittozzi; Italy	Anaïs Chevalier; France
Oslo Holmenkollen 7.5 km Sprint details	Anastasiya Kuzmina; Slovakia	Darya Domracheva; Belarus	Yuliia Dzhima; Ukraine
Oslo Holmenkollen 10 km Pursuit details	Darya Domracheva; Belarus	Anastasiya Kuzmina; Slovakia	Susan Dunklee; United States
Tyumen 7.5 km Sprint details	Darya Domracheva; Belarus	Kaisa Mäkäräinen; Finland	Tiril Eckhoff; Norway
Tyumen 10 km Pursuit details	Kaisa Mäkäräinen; Finland	Anaïs Bescond; France	Laura Dahlmeier; Germany
Tyumen 12.5 km Mass start details	Darya Domracheva; Belarus	Paulína Fialková; Slovakia	Anaïs Chevalier; France

== Standings ==
Point system
Place	IN	SP	PU	MS
1	60			
2	54			
3	48			
4	43			
5	40			
6	38			
7	36			
8	34			
9	32			
10	31			
11	30			
12	29			
13	28			
14	27			
15	26			
16	25			
17	24			
18	23			
19	22			
20	21			
21	20			
22	19			18
23	18			16
24	17			14
25	16			12
26	15			10
27	14			8
28	13			6
29	12			4
30	11			2
31	10			—
32	9			—
33	8			—
34	7			—
35	6			—
36	5			—
37	4			—
38	3			—
39	2			—
40	1			—

In each event places 1 to 40 (1 to 30 in a Mass start) are awarded points, a victory being worth 60 points. The full point system is shown in the table on the right. In a Mass start event only 30 athletes are allowed to participate and the points awarded for ranks 22 to 30 differ from the system used in other events. Equal placings (ties) give an equal number of points. An athlete's total World Cup Score is the sum of all World Cup points earned in the season, minus the points from 2 events in which the athlete got their worst scores. Ties in this score are broken by comparing the tied athletes' number of victories. If this number is the same for the athletes in question, the number of second places is compared, and so on. If a tie cannot be broken by this procedure, it remains a tie.

#	Name	ÖST IN	ÖST SP	ÖST PU	HOC SP	HOC PU	ANN SP	ANN PU	ANN MS	OBE SP	OBE PU	RUH IN	RUH MS	ANT SP	ANT PU	ANT MS	KON SP	KON MS	OSL SP	OSL PU	TYU SP	TYU PU	TYU MS	Total
1.	Kaisa Mäkäräinen (FIN)	30	38	36	38	54	27	31	27	54	40	54	60	~~15~~	40	48	31	43	~~1~~	19	54	60	38	822
2	Anastasiya Kuzmina (SVK)	—	26	~~5~~	54	60	60	54	43	60	60	32	16	23	30	54	11	25	60	54	29	38	30	819
3	Darya Domracheva (BLR)	27	DNF	—	60	48	—	—	—	36	38	38	38	43	48	60	60	31	54	60	60	43	60	804
4	Laura Dahlmeier (GER)	—	—	—	25	31	54	60	48	28	36	0	54	54	60	40	40	36	13	36	38	48	29	730
5	Dorothea Wierer (ITA)	0	32	28	48	43	26	30	32	25	54	60	21	36	54	36	23	20	~~2~~	30	36	25	22	681
6	Lisa Vittozzi (ITA)	20	40	43	27	20	43	48	4	0	5	23	36	~~1~~	32	25	48	54	31	9	40	34	6	588
7	Anaïs Bescond (FRA)	17	24	17	36	28	~~13~~	29	28	20	31	34	24	40	34	~~14~~	14	29	29	23	43	54	28	582
8	Veronika Vítková (CZE)	29	34	21	22	30	25	3	16	48	27	29	48	48	36	8	38	21	30	32	—	—	—	545
9	Franziska Hildebrand (GER)	28	31	~~6~~	34	13	0	6	31	43	30	24	22	32	23	26	54	26	38	27	12	12	27	539
10	Vanessa Hinz (GER)	0	25	34	14	29	23	25	40	0	23	10	20	30	21	32	12	60	16	31	21	13	43	522
11	Yuliia Dzhima (UKR)	48	48	20	21	38	14	DNS	36	0	28	43	23	DNS	—	6	43	27	48	40	—	—	—	483
12	Denise Herrmann (GER)	18	60	60	13	16	40	40	29	0	25	1	40	31	29	20	—	—	0	13	5	14	23	477
13	Ekaterina Yurlova-Percht (RUS)	8	14	30	30	21	21	28	34	26	29	—	18	38	27	31	0	22	36	17	20	6	18	474
14	Marte Olsbu (NOR)	31	36	48	28	40	0	0	30	—	—	15	26	0	—	43	20	38	0	22	31	21	21	450
15	Vita Semerenko (UKR)	1	20	23	43	25	48	34	24	19	48	—	31	19	24	18	36	24	0	—	—	—	—	437
16	Maren Hammerschmidt (GER)	6	27	40	8	1	32	21	20	17	22	26	30	0	17	38	32	30	0	24	3	3	24	421
17	Justine Braisaz (FRA)	34	54	54	18	6	34	36	60	40	32	DNS	8	17	5	21	0	—	—	—	—	—	—	419
18	Nadezhda Skardino (BLR)	60	29	38	15	22	DNS	—	—	6	19	36	25	13	DNS	—	30	32	17	29	0	DNS	25	396
19	Anaïs Chevalier (FRA)	0	0	DNS	0	10	24	18	38	5	0	27	32	14	26	10	2	48	4	25	32	22	48	385
20	Iryna Kryuko (BLR)	3	0	19	6	32	28	22	54	24	21	30	27	0	—	29	26	34	—	—	14	DNS	14	383
21	Valj Semerenko (UKR)	43	19	25	24	23	36	32	26	DNS	—	40	28	0	—	30	6	18	0	—	—	—	—	350
22	Franziska Preuß (GER)	11	0	15	—	—	0	0	—	29	20	9	—	21	31	34	21	—	11	16	17	31	40	306
23	Tiril Eckhoff (NOR)	19	0	0	0	—	0	17	—	DNS	—	0	—	60	43	22	22	—	0	0	48	30	36	297
24	Celia Aymonier (FRA)	15	0	—	31	18	9	19	25	13	26	DNF	6	0	13	27	7	14	16	10	27	11	10	297
25	Selina Gasparin (SUI)	25	5	8	20	11	38	43	22	0	10	0	34	2	22	12	0	8	20	12	—	—	—	292
26	Marie Dorin Habert (FRA)	0	18	27	7	27	11	26	18	0	DNS	—	—	24	28	—	34	23	24	21	—	—	—	288
27	Weronika Nowakowska (POL)	0	21	12	19	17	30	27	10	38	43	28	12	—	—	4	8	10	0	DNS	0	DNS	4	283
28	Anna Frolina (KOR)	0	0	—	0	7	22	2	—	27	34	—	—	20	14	—	24	12	22	38	7	20	31	280
29	Lisa Theresa Hauser (AUT)	24	17	29	12	DNS	—	—	—	14	13	0	—	11	25	—	0	—	9	26	28	26	26	260
30	Galina Vishnevskaya (KAZ)	21	28	31	0	15	—	—	—	0	—	0	—	27	38	16	16	4	10	1	15	24	12	258
#	Name	ÖST IN	ÖST SP	ÖST PU	HOC SP	HOC PU	ANN SP	ANN PU	ANN MS	OBE SP	OBE PU	RUH IN	RUH MS	ANT SP	ANT PU	ANT MS	KON SP	KON MS	OSL SP	OSL PU	TYU SP	TYU PU	TYU MS	Total
31	Synnøve Solemdal (NOR)	54	43	22	26	34	—	—	—	0	0	0	14	0	12	24	0	6	0	0	13	0	2	250
32	Paulína Fialková (SVK)	40	0	—	0	DNF	18	0	—	—	—	4	—	28	19	28	0	—	0	2	26	28	54	247
33	Fuyuko Tachizaki (JPN)	0	0	—	2	4	0	0	—	30	3	0	—	0	8	—	3	—	40	43	24	27	32	216
34	Susan Dunklee (USA)	0	0	—	0	—	31	38	21	0	—	14	—	6	DNS	—	5	—	43	48	—	—	—	206
35	Eva Puskarčíková (CZE)	36	9	0	0	—	15	16	2	31	18	18	2	18	11	—	0	—	23	7	—	—	—	206
36	Daria Virolaynen (RUS)	0	0	0	—	—	—	—	—	4	17	25	10	0	—	—	17	—	26	11	25	36	16	187
37	Mari Laukkanen (FIN)	23	15	11	1	3	29	24	14	15	9	—	—	0	—	—	1	—	21	DNF	0	9	—	175
38	Hanna Öberg (SWE)	16	—	—	DNS	—	20	4	—	—	—	—	—	—	—	—	26	40	28	14	0	19	—	167
39	Tatiana Akimova (RUS)	0	3	14	23	36	19	5	23	3	8	20	—	10	0	2	—	—	—	—	—	—	—	166
40	Ingrid Landmark Tandrevold (NOR)	10	—	—	40	24	—	—	—	8	15	11	—	—	—	—	0	—	18	18	11	8	—	163
41	Mona Brorsson (SWE)	38	0	1	0	—	4	15	—	23	14	12	—	—	—	—	0	—	27	28	0	0	—	162
42	Anastasiya Merkushyna (UKR)	4	7	16	17	19	0	13	—	9	16	22	29	DNS	—	—	0	—	0	5	—	—	—	157
43	Rosanna Crawford (CAN)	2	0	0	0	2	0	DNS	—	—	—	48	43	—	—	—	29	28	3	0	—	—	—	155
44	Lena Häcki (SUI)	0	30	24	0	—	0	0	—	0	—	0	—	0	0	—	9	—	20	0	34	23	8	148
45	Karolin Horchler (GER)	22	0	—	0	9	—	—	—	—	—	—	—	—	—	—	—	—	—	—	30	40	34	135
46	Julia Ransom (CAN)	32	12	18	0	—	2	14	—	32	4	7	—	—	—	—	0	—	0	0	—	—	—	121
47	Krystyna Guzik (POL)	0	22	13	16	8	12	20	8	21	1	0	—	—	—	—	—	—	—	—	—	—	—	121
48	Uliana Kaisheva (RUS)	—	—	—	—	—	—	—	—	—	—	0	—	0	—	—	16	—	34	34	16	16	—	116
49	Elisa Gasparin (SUI)	0	0	0	0	DNS	—	—	—	0	7	16	—	34	0	—	0	—	12	20	22	0	—	111
50	Federica Sanfilippo (ITA)	0	0	0	11	0	16	12	12	2	0	0	—	16	20	—	0	—	5	6	—	—	—	100
51	Linn Persson (SWE)	26	1	0	0	0	0	—	—	34	11	17	—	—	—	—	0	—	0	0	4	4	—	97
52	Olena Pidhrushna (UKR)	0	13	32	0	—	0	11	—	16	24	DNF	—	—	—	—	—	—	—	—	—	—	—	96
53	Iryna Varvynets (UKR)	13	0	—	10	26	0	—	—	0	0	19	—	9	7	—	0	—	0	—	—	—	—	84
54	Hilde Fenne (NOR)	—	23	26	29	5	—	—	—	0	0	—	—	0	—	—	—	—	0	0	0	—	—	83
55	Baiba Bendika (LAT)	12	0	—	0	—	0	0	—	—	—	31	4	25	10	—	0	—	0	0	0	0	—	82
56	Magdalena Gwizdon (POL)	0	10	9	6	0	0	9	—	22	2	0	—	—	—	—	18	—	0	0	—	—	—	76
57	Irina Uslugina (RUS)	—	—	—	—	—	—	—	—	—	—	3	—	0	—	—	—	—	—	—	19	32	20	74
58	Svetlana Mironova (RUS)	—	0	0	32	0	0	—	—	0	—	—	—	—	—	—	0	—	0	—	23	17	—	72
59	Jessica Jislová (CZE)	0	0	—	0	—	17	1	—	0	0	0	—	26	9	—	19	—	0	—	—	—	—	72
60	Ivona Fialková (SVK)	0	0	—	0	0	0	—	—	—	—	0	—	4	LAP	—	27	2	32	0	0	DNS	—	65
#	Name	ÖST IN	ÖST SP	ÖST PU	HOC SP	HOC PU	ANN SP	ANN PU	ANN MS	OBE SP	OBE PU	RUH IN	RUH MS	ANT SP	ANT PU	ANT MS	KON SP	KON MS	OSL SP	OSL PU	TYU SP	TYU PU	TYU MS	Total
61	Nicole Gontier (ITA)	—	—	—	—	—	—	—	—	0	—	0	—	22	16	23	0	—	0	—	—	—	—	61
62	Emma Nilsson (SWE)	0	16	2	0	—	0	0	—	0	0	5	—	0	6	—	0	—	14	0	10	7	—	60
63	Clare Egan (USA)	0	0	—	6	0	0	—	—	0	—	0	—	0	4	—	28	16	0	—	—	—	—	54
64	Elisabeth Högberg (SWE)	—	11	0	—	—	—	—	—	10	0	0	—	—	—	—	0	—	25	4	—	—	—	50
65	Emma Lunder (CAN)	0	0	—	0	14	7	23	6	DNS	—	0	—	—	—	—	0	—	0	DNF	—	—	—	50
66	Katharina Innerhofer (AUT)	—	—	—	0	—	0	8	—	0	—	0	—	0	0	—	0	—	0	0	18	18	—	44
66	Julia Simon (FRA)	—	—	—	—	—	—	—	—	DNF	—	—	—	29	0	—	0	—	0	3	0	10	—	42
68	Alexia Runggaldier (ITA)	0	2	10	DNS	—	—	—	—	—	—	—	—	12	18	—	—	—	—	—	—	—	—	42
69	Sari Furuya (JPN)	0	0	—	0	—	1	0	—	12	12	0	—	0	—	—	13	—	0	—	0	0	—	38
70	Ekaterina Avvakumova (KOR)	0	5	0	0	0	0	10	—	—	—	0	—	DNS	—	—	—	—	7	15	—	—	—	37
71	Victoria Slivko (RUS)	14	6	7	—	—	0	—	—	0	—	2	—	—	—	—	4	—	0	—	0	—	—	33
72	Nadine Horchler (GER)	—	—	—	—	—	—	—	—	—	—	—	—	—	—	—	—	—	—	—	2	29	—	31
73	Chloé Chevalier (FRA)	—	—	—	—	—	0	0	—	—	—	21	—	—	—	—	—	—	—	—	0	5	—	26
74	Dzinara Alimbekava (BLR)	—	—	—	—	—	8	0	—	0	—	6	—	0	0	—	0	—	DNS	—	9	1	—	24
75	Julia Schwaiger (AUT)	0	0	—	—	—	—	—	—	—	—	—	—	—	—	—	—	—	—	—	8	15	—	23
76	Olga Poltoranina (KAZ)	7	0	—	0	—	—	—	—	0	0	13	—	0	3	—	—	—	—	—	—	—	—	23
77	Kaia Wøien Nicolaisen (NOR)	0	0	0	—	—	0	—	—	—	—	0	—	7	15	—	—	—	—	—	—	—	—	22
78	Anja Eržen (SLO)	0	0	0	3	0	10	7	—	0	—	0	—	0	—	—	0	—	0	—	—	—	—	20
79	Sarah Beaudry (CAN)	—	—	—	—	—	—	—	—	18	0	0	—	0	—	—	0	—	0	—	—	—	—	18
80	Nadzeya Pisareva (BLR)	0	8	0	0	—	5	0	—	0	—	—	—	5	0	—	0	—	0	—	0	—	—	18
81	Kamila Żuk (POL)	—	—	—	—	—	0	—	—	—	—	—	—	0	0	—	—	—	6	8	0	0	—	14
82	Monika Hojnisz (POL)	0	0	0	0	DNS	—	—	—	7	6	0	—	—	—	—	0	—	0	—	—	—	—	13
83	Johanna Talihärm (EST)	0	0	—	0	12	0	0	—	—	—	—	—	—	—	—	—	—	—	—	—	—	—	12
84	Alina Raikova (KAZ)	0	0	—	0	0	—	—	—	1	0	0	—	0	1	—	10	—	0	—	0	0	—	12
85	Mun Ji-Hee (KOR)	0	0	—	0	—	0	—	—	11	DNS	—	—	0	—	—	0	—	—	—	0	—	—	11
86	Amanda Lightfoot (GBR)	10	0	—	0	0	—	—	—	0	—	0	—	—	—	—	0	—	0	—	—	—	—	10
87	Olga Podchufarova (RUS)	0	—	—	9	0	—	—	—	—	—	—	—	—	—	—	—	—	—	—	—	—	—	9
88	Veronika Zvařičová (CZE)	—	—	—	0	—	0	—	—	0	—	9	—	0	—	—	0	—	0	—	—	—	—	9
89	Irene Cadurisch (SUI)	0	0	—	0	0	0	0	—	0	0	—	—	0	0	—	0	—	8	0	0	0	—	8
90	Laura Toivanen (FIN)	—	—	—	0	—	0	—	—	0	—	0	—	8	0	—	0	—	0	—	—	—	—	8
#	Name	ÖST IN	ÖST SP	ÖST PU	HOC SP	HOC PU	ANN SP	ANN PU	ANN MS	OBE SP	OBE PU	RUH IN	RUH MS	ANT SP	ANT PU	ANT MS	KON SP	KON MS	OSL SP	OSL PU	TYU SP	TYU PU	TYU MS	Total
91	Markéta Davidová (CZE)	—	—	—	0	0	6	0	—	—	—	—	—	0	2	—	—	—	0	—	—	—	—	8
92	Darya Klimina (KAZ)	0	0	—	0	—	0	—	—	0	0	0	—	0	—	—	0	—	0	—	6	2	—	8
93	Darya Yurkevich (BLR)	5	0	0	0	—	—	—	—	—	—	0	—	—	—	—	—	—	—	—	—	—	—	5
94	Anna Magnusson (SWE)	0	0	4	0	0	0	0	—	0	0	0	—	—	—	—	—	—	—	—	0	0	—	4
94	Thekla Brun-Lie (NOR)	—	—	—	—	—	3	0	—	—	—	—	—	—	—	—	0	—	—	—	—	—	—	3
96	Tang Jialin (CHN)	0	0	3	0	—	0	—	—	0	—	0	—	0	—	—	—	—	0	—	—	—	—	3
97	Natalija Kočergina (LTU)	0	0	—	0	—	0	—	—	0	—	0	—	3	DNS	—	0	—	0	—	0	—	—	3
98	Meril Beilmann (EST)	—	—	—	—	—	—	—	—	—	—	—	—	0	—	—	DNS	—	0	—	1	0	—	1
