= Biathlon World Championships 2012 – Women's individual =

Women's individual at the Biathlon World Championships 2012
- Date: 7 March 2012
- Competitors: 115 from 38 nations
- Winning time: 42:30.0

Medalists
gold medal	Tora Berger	Norway
silver medal	Marie-Laure Brunet	France
bronze medal	Helena Ekholm	Sweden

The women's individual competition of the Biathlon World Championships 2012 was held on March 7, 2012 at 15:15 local time.

== Results ==
The race was started at 15:15.

Rank	Bib	Name	Country	Penalties (P+S+P+S)	Time	Deficit
1st place, gold medalist(s)	21	Tora Berger	Norway	1 (1+0+0+0)	42:30.0	
2nd place, silver medalist(s)	26	Marie-Laure Brunet	France	1 (0+0+0+1)	43:26.4	+56.4
3rd place, bronze medalist(s)	12	Helena Ekholm	Sweden	1 (1+0+0+0)	43:41.1	+1:11.1
4	7	Marie Dorin Habert	France	1 (0+1+0+0)	43:44.7	+1:14.7
5	1	Susan Dunklee	United States	1 (0+1+0+0)	43:48.2	+1:18.2
6	24	Olga Zaitseva	Russia	2 (0+1+1+0)	43:56.1	+1:26.1
7	35	Svetlana Sleptsova	Russia	1 (0+0+1+0)	44:31.0	+2:01.0
8	27	Olga Vilukhina	Russia	2 (2+0+0+0)	44:42.2	+2:12.2
9	20	Michela Ponza	Italy	0 (0+0+0+0)	44:43.7	+2:13.7
10	5	Anastasiya Kuzmina	Slovakia	3 (1+0+1+1)	44:57.8	+2:27.8
11	9	Teja Gregorin	Slovenia	2 (0+1+0+1)	45:16.0	+2:46.0
12	40	Natalia Burdyga	Ukraine	2 (2+0+0+0)	45:19.4	+2:49.4
13	25	Jana Gereková	Slovakia	3 (1+1+1+0)	45:35.5	+3:05.5
14	22	Olena Pidhrushna	Ukraine	2 (0+1+0+1)	45:38.6	+3:08.6
15	2	Veronika Vítková	Czech Republic	3 (1+0+0+2)	46:04.4	+3:34.4
16	17	Vita Semerenko	Ukraine	3 (1+1+0+1)	46:15.1	+3:45.1
17	45	Yana Romanova	Russia	2 (1+0+1+0)	46:22.3	+3:52.3
18	56	Fuyuko Suzuki	Japan	2 (0+0+0+2)	46:43.2	+4:13.2
19	96	Elena Khrustaleva	Kazakhstan	0 (0+0+0+0)	46:47.1	+4:17.1
20	8	Andrea Henkel	Germany	4 (2+2+0+0)	46:49.9	+4:19.9
21	11	Weronika Nowakowska-Ziemniak	Poland	3 (1+1+1+0)	47:07.9	+4:37.9
22	18	Kadri Lehtla	Estonia	3 (1+0+2+0)	47:08.0	+4:38.0
23	19	Magdalena Neuner	Germany	6 (2+0+1+3)	47:10.3	+4:40.3
24	38	Magdalena Gwizdoń	Poland	2 (0+1+0+1)	47:18.4	+4:48.4
25	4	Darya Domracheva	Belarus	6 (4+1+1+0)	47:24.3	+4:54.3
26	28	Zina Kocher	Canada	4 (1+0+1+2)	47:24.6	+4:54.6
27	43	Sophie Boilley	France	2 (1+0+0+1)	47:25.1	+4:55.1
28	31	Kaisa Mäkäräinen	Finland	5 (3+0+1+1)	47:38.4	+5:08.4
29	36	Nastassia Dubarezava	Belarus	4 (2+1+1+0)	47:38.7	+5:08.7
30	66	Megan Heinicke	Canada	2 (1+0+1+0)	47:44.3	+5:14.3
31	59	Réka Ferencz	Romania	1 (0+0+0+1)	47:54.2	+5:24.2
32	70	Iris Waldhuber	Austria	1 (0+1+0+0)	47:54.8	+5:24.8
33	39	Fanny Welle-Strand Horn	Norway	4 (1+1+1+1)	47:57.1	+5:27.1
34	29	Nadezhda Skardino	Belarus	2 (1+1+0+0)	47:58.8	+5:28.8
35	94	Eveli Saue	Estonia	2 (0+1+1+0)	48:03.2	+5:33.2
36	41	Miriam Gössner	Germany	5 (1+2+1+1)	48:05.2	+5:35.2
37	89	Lanny Barnes	United States	1 (0+1+0+0)	48:06.2	+5:36.2
38	61	Sara Studebaker	United States	3 (0+1+1+1)	48:11.2	+5:41.2
39	13	Synnøve Solemdal	Norway	6 (2+2+2+0)	48:11.7	+5:41.7
40	53	Romana Schrempf	Austria	4 (1+2+0+1)	48:18.9	+5:48.9
41	57	Dorothea Wierer	Italy	4 (2+0+0+2)	48:29.1	+5:59.1
42	80	Martina Chrapánová	Slovakia	1 (0+1+0+0)	48:35.5	+6:05.5
43	32	Andreja Mali	Slovenia	2 (1+0+0+1)	48:37.8	+6:07.8
44	97	Marina Lebedeva	Kazakhstan	2 (2+0+0+0)	48:41.9	+6:11.9
45	58	Paulina Bobak	Poland	2 (0+1+1+0)	48:55.1	+6:25.1
46	23	Anna Karin Strömstedt	Sweden	5 (1+3+0+1)	48:55.4	+6:25.4
47	30	Megan Imrie	Canada	5 (0+1+2+2)	49:10.0	+6:40.0
48	34	Tina Bachmann	Germany	7 (2+2+0+3)	49:21.2	+6:51.2
49	42	Valj Semerenko	Ukraine	6 (3+2+0+1)	49:23.5	+6:53.5
50	98	Nina Klenovska	Bulgaria	1 (0+1+0+0)	49:25.8	+6:55.8
51	15	Selina Gasparin	Switzerland	6 (1+2+0+3)	49:27.5	+6:57.5
52	78	Veronika Zvařičová	Czech Republic	3 (1+1+1+0)	49:41.3	+7:11.3
53	37	Anais Bescond	France	6 (1+1+2+2)	49:43.2	+7:13.2
54	44	Emilia Yordanova	Bulgaria	3 (1+1+1+0)	49:45.2	+7:15.2
55	55	Diana Rasimovičiūtė	Lithuania	5 (2+1+0+2)	49:49.1	+7:19.1
56	16	Anna Maria Nilsson	Sweden	6 (0+1+2+3)	49:50.2	+7:20.2
57	76	Yuki Nakajima	Japan	3 (0+1+1+1)	49:56.0	+7:26.0
58	52	Jenny Jonsson	Sweden	4 (0+2+0+2)	49:57.7	+7:27.7
59	46	Amanda Lightfoot	United Kingdom	4 (2+2+0+0)	50:07.0	+7:37.0
60	10	Mari Laukkanen	Finland	6 (1+3+1+1)	50:10.3	+7:40.3
61	60	Kristel Viigipuu	Estonia	3 (0+2+0+1)	50:11.2	+7:41.2
62	73	Ramona Düringer	Austria	3 (0+1+1+1)	50:14.1	+7:44.1
63	102	Daria Yurlova	Estonia	2 (0+2+0+0)	50:17.9	+7:47.9
64	48	Olga Poltoranina	Kazakhstan	3 (3+0+0+0)	50:19.5	+7:49.5
65	3	Krystyna Pałka	Poland	6 (1+1+2+2)	50:22.6	+7:52.6
66	62	Annelies Cook	United States	6 (2+3+1+0)	50:27.4	+7:57.4
67	14	Laure Soulié	Andorra	6 (3+2+0+1)	50:28.6	+7:58.6
68	69	Nicole Gontier	Italy	4 (1+1+1+1)	50:34.5	+8:04.5
69	6	Éva Tófalvi	Romania	6 (1+1+1+3)	50:54.6	+8:24.6
70	81	Eevamari Oksanen	Finland	3 (1+1+1+0)	50:59.6	+8:29.6
71	33	Elise Ringen	Norway	8 (1+1+2+4)	50:59.8	+8:29.8
72	100	Natalija Kocergina	Lithuania	5 (1+1+1+2)	51:28.5	+8:58.5
73	49	Elisabeth Högberg	Sweden	5 (4+1+0+0)	51:41.6	+9:11.6
74	90	Patricia Jost	Switzerland	2 (0+1+0+1)	51:42.6	+9:12.6
75	67	Elisa Gasparin	Switzerland	4 (1+3+0+0)	51:52.3	+9:22.3
76	50	Katja Haller	Italy	6 (3+3+0+0)	51:52.4	+9:22.4
77	88	Song Chaoqing	China	3 (1+1+1+0)	51:56.4	+9:26.4
78	99	Zhang Yan	China	0 (0+0+0+0)	52:21.7	+9:51.7
79	110	Desislava Stoyanova	Bulgaria	5 (2+1+1+1)	52:31.9	+10:01.9
80	72	Niya Dimitrova	Bulgaria	5 (0+1+2+2)	52:35.4	+10:05.4
81	47	Darya Usanova	Kazakhstan	8 (2+1+2+3)	52:37.2	+10:07.2
82	105	Jitka Landová	Czech Republic	5 (1+2+1+1)	53:04.7	+10:34.7
83	103	Barbora Tomešová	Czech Republic	7 (4+2+1+0)	53:39.6	+11:09.6
84	63	Itsuka Owada	Japan	7 (1+3+3+0)	54:00.2	+11:30.2
85	86	Sarah Murphy	New Zealand	5 (0+2+1+2)	54:05.5	+11:35.5
86	115	Katharina Innerhofer	Austria	6 (0+3+0+3)	54:17.4	+11:47.4
87	83	Kim Seon-su	South Korea	5 (2+2+1+0)	54:26.6	+11:56.6
88	74	Jaqueline Mourão	Brazil	5 (1+1+2+1)	54:32.5	+12:02.5
89	82	Zanna Juskane	Latvia	6 (1+3+2+0)	54:38.0	+12:08.0
90	75	Adele Walker	United Kingdom	6 (1+1+3+1)	54:39.0	+12:09.0
91	87	Chardine Sloof	Netherlands	5 (1+1+1+2)	54:46.9	+12:16.9
92	92	Aliona Sabaliauskiene	Lithuania	3 (0+0+0+3)	55:07.1	+12:37.1
93	91	Alexandra Camenșcic	Moldova	2 (0+1+0+1)	55:15.8	+12:45.8
94	51	Tang Jialin	China	6 (1+3+1+1)	55:31.7	+13:01.7
95	65	Luminita Piscoran	Romania	9 (3+2+1+3)	55:32.2	+13:02.2
96	95	Kim Seo-ra	South Korea	6 (0+4+0+2)	55:33.4	+13:03.4
97	79	Yolaine Oddou	Canada	7 (3+0+4+0)	55:48.5	+13:18.5
98	68	Sanna Markkanen	Finland	7 (2+2+1+2)	55:54.8	+13:24.8
99	93	Baiba Bendika	Latvia	5 (1+0+2+2)	56:09.7	+13:39.7
100	71	Emőke Szőcs	Hungary	7 (0+3+1+3)	56:14.4	+13:44.4
101	116	Arisa Goshono	Japan	6 (1+2+2+1)	56:18.7	+13:48.7
102	108	Inga Paškovska	Latvia	5 (1+4+0+0)	56:21.9	+13:51.9
103	85	Victoria Padial Hernández	Spain	8 (2+2+1+3)	56:44.2	+14:14.2
104	84	Nerys Jones	United Kingdom	8 (1+2+3+2)	57:19.8	+14:49.8
105	104	Kim Kyung-nam	South Korea	5 (0+2+1+2)	57:47.1	+15:17.1
106	106	Fay Potton	United Kingdom	6 (2+1+2+1)	58:46.8	+16:16.8
107	113	Wang Yue	China	10 (1+3+2+4)	59:00.9	+16:30.9
108	77	Lucy Glanville	Australia	6 (0+1+1+4)	59:08.6	+16:38.6
109	101	Tanja Karišik	Bosnia and Herzegovina	6 (1+1+3+1)	59:30.5	+17:00.5
110	107	Uiloq Slettemark	Greenland	6 (0+2+1+3)	59:45.1	+17:15.1
111	109	Anete Brice	Latvia	7 (1+1+5+0)	1:00:12.0	+17:42.0
112	111	Florina Ioana Cirstea	Romania	10 (4+3+1+2)	1:02:58.9	+20:28.9
113	112	Marija Kaznacenko	Lithuania	13 (3+5+4+1)	1:03:34.9	+21:04.9
114	64	Nihan Erdiler	Turkey	10 (3+3+1+3)	1:04:36.9	+22:06.9
	54	Iryna Kryuko	Belarus	3 (1+1+1+)	DNF	
	114	Mun Ji-hee	South Korea		DNS	
