= Biathlon World Championships 2012 – Women's mass start =

Women's mass start at the Biathlon World Championships 2012
- Date: 11 March 2012
- Competitors: 30 from 17 nations
- Winning time: 35:41.6

Medalists
gold medal	Tora Berger	Norway
silver medal	Marie-Laure Brunet	France
bronze medal	Kaisa Mäkäräinen	Finland

The women's mass start competition of the Biathlon World Championships 2012 was held on March 11, 2012 at 16:00 local time.

== Results ==
The race started at 16:00.

Rank	Bib	Name	Country	Penalties (P+P+S+S)	Time	Deficit
1st place, gold medalist(s)	3	Tora Berger	Norway	1 (0+0+1+0)	35:41.6	
2nd place, silver medalist(s)	4	Marie-Laure Brunet	France	1 (0+0+0+1)	35:49.7	+8.1
3rd place, bronze medalist(s)	9	Kaisa Mäkäräinen	Finland	1 (0+0+0+1)	35:54.3	+12.7
4	24	Tina Bachmann	Germany	2 (0+1+0+1)	36:24.0	+42.4
5	2	Darya Domracheva	Belarus	5 (1+0+2+2)	36:37.2	+55.6
6	11	Marie Dorin Habert	France	1 (0+0+1+0)	36:40.5	+58.9
7	5	Vita Semerenko	Ukraine	1 (0+1+0+0)	36:41.6	+1:00.0
8	12	Anastasiya Kuzmina	Slovakia	3 (1+1+0+1)	36:43.5	+1:01.9
9	18	Weronika Nowakowska-Ziemniak	Poland	2 (0+0+1+1)	36:44.9	+1:03.3
10	1	Magdalena Neuner	Germany	6 (1+1+1+3)	36:52.0	+1:10.4
11	28	Jana Gereková	Slovakia	2 (0+0+0+2)	36:56.9	+1:15.3
12	10	Andrea Henkel	Germany	3 (0+1+1+1)	37:00.5	+1:18.9
13	14	Teja Gregorin	Slovenia	2 (0+0+2+0)	37:02.4	+1:20.8
14	17	Veronika Vítková	Czech Republic	2 (0+0+0+2)	37:02.8	+1:21.2
15	7	Helena Ekholm	Sweden	2 (0+1+0+1)	37:06.4	+1:24.8
16	26	Susan Dunklee	United States	1 (1+0+0+0)	37:10.3	+1:28.7
17	29	Anaïs Bescond	France	4 (1+1+1+1)	37:20.5	+1:38.9
18	13	Synnøve Solemdal	Norway	4 (0+1+1+2)	37:20.6	+1:39.0
19	6	Olga Vilukhina	Russia	3 (2+1+0+0)	37:22.0	+1:40.4
20	19	Anna Maria Nilsson	Sweden	2 (0+0+1+1)	37:33.1	+1:51.5
21	25	Fuyuko Suzuki	Japan	1 (1+0+0+0)	37:54.0	+2:12.4
22	23	Elise Ringen	Norway	5 (0+0+3+2)	38:00.0	+2:18.4
23	23	Zina Kocher	Canada	4 (1+1+1+1)	38:12.2	+2:30.6
24	15	Svetlana Sleptsova	Russia	5 (2+1+1+1)	38:40.6	+2:59.0
25	30	Krystyna Pałka	Poland	5 (0+0+2+3)	38:51.2	+3:09.6
26	20	Selina Gasparin	Switzerland	5 (1+1+1+2)	39:09.1	+3:27.5
27	27	Mari Laukkanen	Finland	5 (2+1+0+2)	40:10.6	+4:29.0
28	22	Michela Ponza	Italy	4 (1+1+1+1)	40:25.4	+4:43.8
29	16	Magdalena Gwizdoń	Poland	5 (3+0+1+1)	41:08.1	+5:26.5
	8	Olga Zaitseva	Russia	1 (0+0+0+1)	DSQ	
