= Biathlon World Championships 2013 – Mixed relay =

Mixed relay at the Biathlon World Championships 2013
- Date: 7 February 2013
- Competitors: 108 from 27 nations
- Winning time: 1:12:04.94

Medalists
| gold medal | Tora Berger; Synnøve Solemdal; Tarjei Bø; Emil Hegle Svendsen | Norway |
| silver medal | Marie-Laure Brunet; Marie Dorin Habert; Alexis Bœuf; Martin Fourcade | France |
| bronze medal | Veronika Vítková; Gabriela Soukalová; Jaroslav Soukup; Ondřej Moravec | Czech Republic |

The Mixed relay event of the Biathlon World Championships 2013 was held on February 7, 2013. 27 nations participated with two male and female biathletes. The women's course was 6 km and the men's 7.5 km.

== Results ==
The race started at 17:30.

| Rank | Bib | Team | Time | Penalties (P+S) | Deficit |
|---|---|---|---|---|---|
| 1st place, gold medalist(s) | 2 | Norway; Tora Berger; Synnøve Solemdal; Tarjei Bø; Emil Hegle Svendsen | 1:12:04.9; 15:45.6; 17:16.2; 19:29.4; 19:33.7 | 0+1 0+3; 0+0 0+0; 0+0 0+2; 0+1 0+0; 0+0 0+1 | |
| 2nd place, silver medalist(s) | 5 | France; Marie-Laure Brunet; Marie Dorin Habert; Alexis Bœuf; Martin Fourcade | 1:12:24.9; 16:29.3; 16:45.8; 19:47.1; 19:22.7 | 0+1 0+7; 0+0 0+2; 0+1 0+2; 0+0 0+2; 0+0 0+1 | +20.0 |
| 3rd place, bronze medalist(s) | 3 | Czech Republic; Veronika Vítková; Gabriela Soukalová; Jaroslav Soukup; Ondřej Moravec | 1:12:37.2; 16:30.0; 16:56.4; 19:46.1; 19:24.7 | 0+3 0+2; 0+2 0+1; 0+1 0+0; 0+0 0+1; 0+0 0+0 | +32.3 |
| 4 | 7 | Italy; Dorothea Wierer; Karin Oberhofer; Dominik Windisch; Lukas Hofer | 1:13:03.3; 16:24.0; 17:10.3; 19:44.8; 19:44.2 | 0+1 0+3; 0+0 0+0; 0+1 0+1; 0+0 0+0; 0+0 0+2 | +58.4 |
| 5 | 6 | Slovenia; Andreja Mali; Teja Gregorin; Klemen Bauer; Jakov Fak | 1:13:12.0; 16:56.5; 16:55.3; 19:42.1; 19:38.1 | 0+2 0+4; 0+0 0+1; 0+0 0+0; 0+2 0+2; 0+0 0+1 | +1:07.1 |
| 6 | 1 | Russia; Olga Zaitseva; Olga Vilukhina; Anton Shipulin; Dmitry Malyshko | 1:13:31.4; 15:57.7; 17:00.4; 19:45.4; 20:47.9 | 1+7 0+2; 0+0 0+1; 0+1 0+0; 0+3 0+0; 1+3 0+1 | +1:26.5 |
| 7 | 11 | Slovakia; Jana Gereková; Anastasiya Kuzmina; Pavol Hurajt; Matej Kazar | 1:13:37.6; 16:21.0; 16:50.4; 20:28.9; 19:57.3 | 0+5 0+3; 0+0 0+1; 0+1 0+2; 0+1 0+0; 0+3 0+0 | +1:32.7 |
| 8 | 17 | United States; Annelies Cook; Susan Dunklee; Lowell Bailey; Leif Nordgren | 1:13:37.7; 16:58.0; 16:38.9; 20:01.1; 19:59.7 | 0+3 0+4; 0+0 0+3; 0+0 0+1; 0+2 0+0; 0+1 0+0 | +1:32.8 |
| 9 | 10 | Ukraine; Juliya Dzhyma; Natalya Burdyga; Andriy Deryzemlya; Serguei Sednev | 1:13:55.8; 16:37.0; 17:13.9; 20:13.1; 19:51.8 | 1+4 0+4; 0+0 0+2; 0+0 0+1; 1+3 0+1; 0+1 0+0 | +1:50.9 |
| 10 | 14 | Poland; Krystyna Pałka; Magdalena Gwizdoń; Łukasz Szczurek; Krzysztof Plywaczyk | 1:13:58.7; 16:05.5; 16:58.7; 20:29.9; 20:24.6 | 0+3 0+4; 0+1 0+0; 0+2 0+1; 0+0 0+1; 0+0 0+2 | +1:53.8 |
| 11 | 12 | Belarus; Nadezhda Skardino; Darya Domracheva; Evgeny Abramenko; Sergey Novikov | 1:14:17.6; 16:43.2; 16:56.0; 20:23.2; 20:15.2 | 0+2 0+3; 0+1 0+0; 0+0 0+3; 0+0 0+0; 0+1 0+0 | +2:12.7 |
| 12 | 9 | Switzerland; Elisa Gasparin; Selina Gasparin; Claudio Böckli; Benjamin Weger | 1:14:45.5; 16:58.9; 16:52.2; 20:28.1; 20:26.3 | 0+7 0+2; 0+1 0+2; 0+2 0+0; 0+2 0+0; 0+2 0+0 | +2:40.6 |
| 13 | 4 | Germany; Andrea Henkel; Miriam Gössner; Simon Schempp; Andreas Birnbacher | 1:14:45.6; 16:27.7; 18:06.8; 20:01.0; 20:10.1 | 0+3 1+7; 0+1 0+1; 0+1 1+3; 0+1 0+0; 0+0 0+3 | +2:40.7 |
| 14 | 8 | Sweden; Elisabeth Högberg; Jenny Jonsson; Björn Ferry; Fredrik Lindström | 1:14:51.8; 16:59.8; 18:14.2; 19:48.6; 19:49.2 | 0+3 0+3; 0+1 0+1; 0+0 0+0; 0+1 0+0; 0+1 0+2 | +2:46.9 |
| 15 | 16 | Canada; Rosanna Crawford; Megan Heinicke; Jean-Philippe Leguellec; Scott Perras | 1:15:09.6; 16:49.5; 18:04.8; 20:01.4; 20:13.9 | 0+3 0+6; 0+2 0+1; 0+0 0+2; 0+0 0+2; 0+1 0+1 | +3:04.7 |
| 16 | 24 | Bulgaria; Emilia Yordanova; Niya Dimitrova; Krasimir Anev; Michail Kletcherov | 1:16:33.4; 17:39.5; 17:59.0; 19:52.2; 21:02.7 | 0+1 0+6; 0+1 0+1; 0+0 0+2; 0+0 0+2; 0+0 0+1 | +4:28.5 |
| 17 | 15 | Austria; Iris Schwabl; Romana Schrempf; Julian Eberhard; Dominik Landertinger | 1:16:51.5; 16:54.8; 19:02.1; 20:58.2; 19:56.4 | 0+5 5+7; 0+0 0+1; 0+0 3+3; 0+2 2+3; 0+2 0+1 | +4:46.6 |
| 18 | 20 | Kazakhstan; Elena Khrustaleva; Darya Usanova; Yan Savitskiy; Sergey Naumik | 1:17:26.2; 17:00.2; 19:44.5; 19:58.2; 20:43.3 | 3+5 1+4; 0+0 0+1; 3+3 1+3; 0+1 0+0; 0+1 0+0 | +5:21.3 |
| 19 | 13 | Finland; Mari Laukkanen; Kaisa Mäkäräinen; Jarkko Kauppinen; Ahti Toivanen | 1:17:58.1; 17:42.5; 17:52.0; 21:12.5; 21:11.1 | 0+3 3+10; 0+0 2+3; 0+1 1+3; 0+2 0+2; 0+0 0+2 | +5:53.2 |
| 20 | 21 | Estonia; Kadri Lehtla; Daria Yurlova; Roland Lessing; Kauri Kõiv | LAP; 17:31.5; 19:07.5; 20:36.6 | 0+7 1+6; 0+1 0+0; 0+1 1+3; 0+2 0+1; 0+3 0+2 | |
| 21 | 19 | Romania; Réka Ferencz; Luminita Piscoran; Ştefan Gavrila; Cornel Puchianu | LAP; 17:21.1; 18:03.0; 21:26.7 | 1+6 0+9; 0+1 0+0; 0+0 0+3; 1+3 0+3; 0+2 0+3 | |
| 22 | 18 | Japan; Fuyuko Suzuki; Arisa Goshono; Hidenori Isa; Junji Nagai | LAP; 17:54.1; 18:58.1; 20:34.2 | 1+6 0+6; 1+3 0+2; 0+3 0+0; 0+0 0+2; 0+0 0+2 | |
| 23 | 22 | China; Ma Wei; Wang Yue; Chen Haibin; Ren Long | LAP; 17:51.9; 18:33.9; 20:47.0 | 1+5 1+7; 1+3 0+2; 0+0 0+2; 0+0 0+0; 0+2 1+3 | |
| 24 | 25 | Latvia; Žanna Juškāne; Baiba Bendika; Edgars Piksons; Rolands Pužulis | LAP; 18:05.8; 19:34.5; 20:58.0 | 0+5 0+3; 0+3 0+2; 0+0 0+0; 0+1 0+1; 0+1 0+0 | |
| 25 | 23 | Lithuania; Natalija Kočergina; Diana Rasimovičiūtė; Karol Dombrovski; Tomas Kaukėnas | LAP; 18:44.9; 19:22.9; 22:12.2 | 0+5 2+10; 0+0 1+3; 0+1 1+3; 0+1 0+3; 0+3 0+1 | |
| 26 | 26 | Great Britain; Amanda Lightfoot; Adele Walker; Lee-Steve Jackson; Kevin Kane | LAP; 17:39.3; 21:02.1; 21:09.6 | 0+7 3+9; 0+2 0+2; 0+3 3+3; 0+0 0+2; 0+2 0+2 | |
| 27 | 27 | South Korea; Jo In-Hee; Kim Seon-Su; Lee In-Bok; Jun Je-Uk | LAP; 18:40.8; 20:08.3; 22:15.6 | 0+7 0+6; 0+0 0+2; 0+3 0+1; 0+1 0+0; 0+3 0+3 | |
