= Biathlon World Championships 2011 – Women's sprint =

Women's sprint at the Biathlon World Championships 2011
- Location: Khanty-Mansiysk, Russia
- Date: 5 March
- Competitors: 103 from 32 nations
- Winning time: 20:31.2

Medalists
gold medal	Magdalena Neuner	Germany
silver medal	Kaisa Mäkäräinen	Finland
bronze medal	Anastasiya Kuzmina	Slovakia

The women's sprint competition of the Biathlon World Championships 2011 was held on March 5, 2011 at 18:00 local time. 103 athletes participated.

== Results ==
Rank	Bib	Name	Country	Penalties (P+S)	Time	Deficit
1st place, gold medalist(s)	5	Magdalena Neuner	Germany	0 (0+0)	20:31.2	0.0
2nd place, silver medalist(s)	48	Kaisa Mäkäräinen	Finland	0 (0+0)	20:43.4	+12.2
3rd place, bronze medalist(s)	7	Anastasiya Kuzmina	Slovakia	1 (0+1)	21:11.2	+40.0
4	56	Olga Zaitseva	Russia	0 (0+0)	21:18.9	+47.7
5	17	Helena Ekholm	Sweden	0 (0+0)	21:32.2	+1:01.0
6	14	Ekaterina Yurlova	Russia	0 (0+0)	21:47.5	+1:16.3
7	32	Tora Berger	Norway	2 (1+1)	21:54.2	+1:23.0
8	16	Marie Dorin	France	0 (0+0)	22:02.9	+1:31.7
9	46	Miriam Gössner	Germany	2 (1+1)	22:06.9	+1:35.7
10	50	Valj Semerenko	Ukraine	1 (0+1)	22:09.6	+1:38.4
11	47	Anna Carin Zidek	Sweden	1 (0+1)	22:12.7	+1:41.5
12	6	Anna Maria Nilsson	Sweden	0 (0+0)	22:17.1	+1:45.9
13	20	Agnieszka Cyl	Poland	0 (0+0)	22:17.8	+1:46.6
14	36	Éva Tófalvi	Romania	0 (0+0)	22:21.3	+1:50.1
15	13	Nadezhda Skardino	Belarus	0 (0+0)	22:21.7	+1:50.5
16	49	Jana Gerekova	Slovakia	1 (0+1)	22:22.2	+1:51.0
17	44	Vita Semerenko	Ukraine	2 (1+1)	22:28.0	+1:56.8
18	38	Tadeja Brankovič-Likozar	Slovenia	1 (0+1)	22:29.1	+1:57.9
19	35	Andrea Henkel	Germany	2 (1+1)	22:32.1	+2:00.9
20	87	Anna Bogaliy-Titovets	Russia	1 (0+1)	22:33.1	+2:01.9
21	86	Inna Suprun	Ukraine	1 (0+1)	22:35.7	+2:04.5
22	1	Michela Ponza	Italy	1 (1+0)	22:37.1	+2:05.9
23	85	Fanny Welle-Strand Horn	Norway	0 (0+0)	22:37.8	+2:06.6
24	26	Gabriela Soukalová	Czech Republic	1 (0+1)	22:40.8	+2:09.6
25	31	Darya Domracheva	Belarus	3 (1+2)	22:44.7	+2:13.5
26	68	Kathrin Hitzer	Germany	2 (2+0)	22:47.6	+2:16.4
27	92	Dorothea Wierer	Italy	1 (0+1)	23:03.0	+2:31.8
28	28	Mari Laukkanen	Finland	1 (1+0)	23:07.1	+2:35.9
29	10	Andreja Mali	Slovenia	1 (0+1)	23:14.1	+2:42.9
30	29	Olena Pidhrushna	Ukraine	3 (1+2)	23:17.9	+2:46.7
31	51	Magdalena Gwizdoń	Poland	1 (0+1)	23:20.2	+2:49.0
32	30	Ramona Düringer	Austria	3 (0+3)	23:20.3	+2:49.1
33	24	Ann Kristin Aafedt Flatland	Norway	2 (0+2)	23:26.4	+2:55.2
33	74	Sophie Boilley	France	2 (1+1)	23:26.4	+2:55.2
35	9	Marina Lebedeva	Kazakhstan	1 (1+0)	23:27.2	+2:56.0
36	25	Itsuka Owada	Japan	1 (0+1)	23:27.5	+2:56.3
37	53	Wang Chunli	China	0 (0+0)	23:27.7	+2:56.5
38	55	Anais Bescond	France	2 (0+2)	23:30.2	+2:59.0
39	57	Katja Haller	Italy	1 (1+0)	23:31.8	+3:00.6
40	63	Fuyuko Suzuki	Japan	0 (0+0)	23:32.3	+3:01.1
41	23	Eveli Saue	Estonia	1 (0+1)	23:32.7	+3:01.5
42	59	Synnøve Solemdal	Norway	2 (1+1)	23:34.7	+3:03.5
43	11	Marie-Laure Brunet	France	2 (2+0)	23:38.7	+3:07.5
44	64	Anna Karin Strömstedt	Sweden	4 (3+1)	23:40.1	+3:08.9
45	42	Emilia Yordanova	Bulgaria	1 (1+0)	23:49.5	+3:18.3
46	95	Anastasia Tokareva	Russia	1 (1+0)	23:52.4	+3:21.2
47	18	Sara Studebaker	United States	3 (1+2)	23:56.6	+3:25.4
48	76	Karin Oberhofer	Italy	1 (0+1)	24:03.3	+3:32.1
49	61	Liudmila Kalinchik	Belarus	3 (1+2)	24:05.3	+3:34.1
50	2	Ekaterina Vinogradova	Armenia	3 (2+1)	24:10.9	+3:39.7
51	102	Inna Mozhevitina	Kazakhstan	1 (0+1)	24:11.9	+3:40.7
52	21	Laure Soulie	Andorra	0 (0+0)	24:12.7	+3:41.5
53	62	Amanda Lightfoot	Great Britain	2 (0+2)	24:16.8	+3:45.6
54	8	Selina Gasparin	Switzerland	3 (1+2)	24:22.3	+3:51.1
54	45	Veronika Vítková	Czech Republic	3 (1+2)	24:22.3	+3:51.1
56	99	Annalies Cook	United States	2 (1+1)	24:26.1	+3:54.9
57	78	Olga Poltoranina	Kazakhstan	1 (0+1)	24:28.7	+3:57.5
58	83	Sarianna Repo	Finland	0 (0+0)	24:29.1	+3:57.9
59	19	Diana Rasimovičiūtė	Lithuania	3 (2+1)	24:32.2	+4:01.0
60	39	Zina Kocher	Canada	5 (2+3)	24:34.5	+4:03.3
61	84	Barbora Tomešová	Czech Republic	2 (1+1)	24:34.9	+4:03.7
62	101	Daria Yurlova	Estonia	2 (1+1)	24:37.0	+4:05.8
63	60	Elisa Gasparin	Switzerland	2 (1+1)	24:39.1	+4:07.9
64	70	Nadzeya Pisareva	Belarus	2 (1+1)	24:40.2	+4:09.0
65	67	Kadri Lehtla	Estonia	4 (3+1)	24:47.0	+4:15.8
66	27	Nina Klenovska	Bulgaria	3 (2+1)	24:47.6	+4:16.4
67	43	Elena Khrustaleva	Kazakhstan	2 (0+2)	24:48.2	+4:17.0
68	80	Monika Hojnisz	Poland	3 (2+1)	24:48.7	+4:17.5
69	34	Tang Jialin	China	5 (3+2)	24:52.9	+4:21.7
70	100	Zdeňka Vejnarová	Czech Republic	3 (1+2)	24:53.8	+4:22.6
71	71	Haley Johnson	United States	4 (2+2)	24:58.8	+4:27.6
72	22	Madara Līduma	Latvia	4 (1+3)	24:59.1	+4:27.9
73	37	Mun Ji-hee	South Korea	3 (0+3)	25:04.3	+4:33.1
74	82	Martina Chrapánová	Slovakia	4 (1+3)	25:05.0	+4:33.8
75	94	Paulina Bobak	Poland	2 (1+1)	25:15.2	+4:44.0
76	41	Iris Waldhuber	Austria	4 (1+3)	25:21.7	+4:50.5
77	54	Žanna Juškāne	Latvia	3 (2+1)	25:26.8	+4:55.6
78	40	Laura Spector	United States	5 (3+2)	25:29.8	+4:58.6
79	81	Kristel Viigipuu	Estonia	3 (2+1)	25:37.3	+5:06.1
80	93	Wang Yue	China	3 (1+2)	25:39.8	+5:08.6
81	88	Natsuko Abe	Japan	4 (1+3)	25:48.1	+5:16.9
82	65	Réka Ferencz	Romania	4 (3+1)	25:54.1	+5:22.9
83	98	Nerys Jones	Great Britain	3 (3+0)	25:56.0	+5:24.8
84	52	Sarah Murphy	New Zealand	3 (0+3)	25:56.6	+5:25.4
85	79	Niya Dimitrova	Bulgaria	5 (1+4)	26:01.8	+5:30.6
86	72	Xu Yinghui	China	2 (1+1)	26:03.4	+5:32.2
87	97	Naoko Azegami	Japan	5 (2+3)	26:08.8	+5:37.6
88	77	Fay Potton	Great Britain	2 (1+1)	26:14.7	+5:43.5
89	89	Luminiţa Piscoran	Romania	5 (2+3)	26:28.4	+5:57.2
90	33	Adele Walker	Great Britain	6 (4+2)	26:35.6	+6:04.4
91	66	Martina Halinárová	Slovakia	5 (4+1)	26:40.8	+6:09.6
92	58	Aliona Sosunova	Lithuania	3 (1+2)	26:42.7	+6:11.5
93	73	Chu Kyoung-mi	South Korea	3 (1+2)	26:52.6	+6:21.4
94	96	Sanna Markkanen	Finland	6 (3+3)	26:53.8	+6:22.6
95	90	Desislava Stoyanova	Bulgaria	5 (2+3)	26:57.6	+6:26.4
96	12	Kim Seo-ra	South Korea	3 (3+0)	27:05.6	+6:34.4
97	69	Natalija Kočergina	Lithuania	4 (3+1)	27:44.8	+7:13.6
98	103	Natália Prekopová	Slovakia	5 (3+2)	28:10.9	+7:39.7
99	3	Tanja Karisik	Bosnia and Herzegovina	4 (2+2)	28:37.6	+8:06.4
100	75	Anete Brice	Latvia	5 (1+4)	29:03.6	+8:32.4
101	15	Alexandra Camenşcic	Moldova	5 (3+2)	30:12.7	+9:41.5
	91	Jo In-hee	South Korea	(1+)	DNF	
	4	Teja Gregorin	Slovenia	1 (0+1)	DSQ	
