= Tora Berger =

Norwegian biathlete (born 1981)

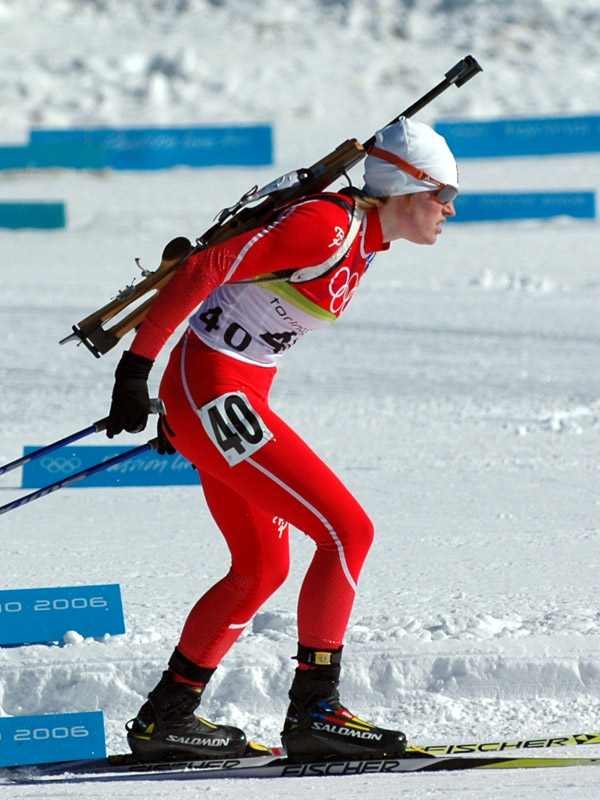

Personal information
- Full name: Tora Berger
- Born: 18 March 1981 (age 45) Ringerike, Norway
- Height: 1.64 m (5 ft 5 in)

Sport
- Sport: Skiing

World Cup career
- Seasons: 2001–2014
- Indiv. podiums: 63
- Indiv. wins: 28
- Discipline titles: 2 (2012–13, 2013–14)
Medal record
Women's biathlon
Representing Norway
| Event | 1st | 2nd | 3rd |
|---|---|---|---|
| Olympic Games (4 medals) | 2 | 1 | 1 |
| World Championships (18 medals) | 8 | 5 | 5 |
| Junior/Youth World Championships (1 medal) | 0 | 0 | 1 |
| Total (23 medals) | 10 | 6 | 7 |
Olympic Games
| Gold medal – first place | 2010 Vancouver | 15 km individual |
| Gold medal – first place | 2014 Sochi | Mixed relay |
| Silver medal – second place | 2014 Sochi | 10 km pursuit |
| Silver medal – second place | 2014 Sochi | 4 × 6 km relay |
World Championships
| Gold medal – first place | 2011 Khanty-Mansiysk | Mixed relay |
| Gold medal – first place | 2012 Ruhpolding | 15 km individual |
| Gold medal – first place | 2012 Ruhpolding | 12.5 km mass start |
| Gold medal – first place | 2012 Ruhpolding | Mixed relay |
| Gold medal – first place | 2013 Nové Město | 15 km individual |
| Gold medal – first place | 2013 Nové Město | 10 km pursuit |
| Gold medal – first place | 2013 Nové Město | 4 × 6 km relay |
| Gold medal – first place | 2013 Nové Město | Mixed relay |
| Silver medal – second place | 2006 Pokljuka | Mixed relay |
| Silver medal – second place | 2008 Östersund | 12.5 km mass start |
| Silver medal – second place | 2010 Khanty-Mansiysk | Mixed relay |
| Silver medal – second place | 2013 Nové Město | 7.5 km sprint |
| Silver medal – second place | 2013 Nové Město | 12.5 km mass start |
| Bronze medal – third place | 2007 Antholz-Anterselva | 4 × 6 km relay |
| Bronze medal – third place | 2007 Antholz-Anterselva | Mixed relay |
| Bronze medal – third place | 2009 Pyeongchang | 15 km individual |
| Bronze medal – third place | 2011 Khanty-Mansiysk | 12.5 km mass start |
| Bronze medal – third place | 2012 Ruhpolding | 4 × 6 km relay |
Junior World Championships
| Bronze medal – third place | 2000 Hochfilzen | 7.5 km sprint |
- Updated on 20 March 2014

Tora Berger (born 18 March 1981) is a retired Norwegian biathlete and Olympic champion.

== Personal life ==
Berger married in 2010, having met her husband in high school. They have two dogs. She is the younger sister of biathlete and cross-country skier Lars Berger.

== Career ==
She has been a member of the Norwegian women's biathlon team since 1999. She has 28 individual victories in the World Cup.

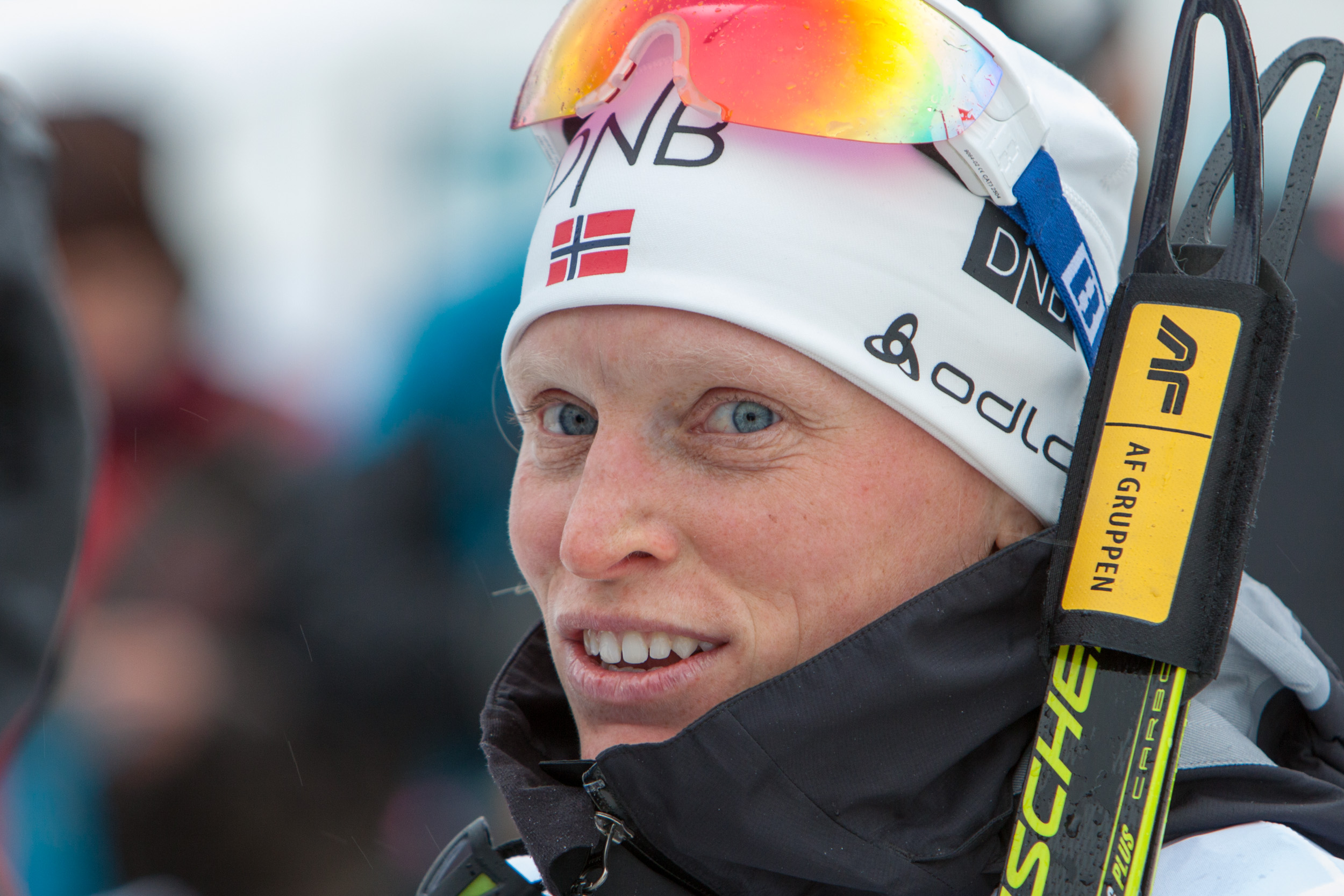
Tora Berger

At the 2008 World Championship, she received three 4th places, before earning the silver medal in the mass start.

On 18 February 2010, she became the first Norwegian woman to win an Olympic gold medal in biathlon by winning the women's 15 km individual at the 2010 Winter Olympics in Vancouver. By doing this, she won Norway's 100th Olympic gold medal at the Winter Olympic Games, as well as winning the 10th Norwegian biathlon gold medal. This historic medal makes Norway the first ever nation to win 100 gold medals at the Winter Olympic Games.

At the Biathlon World Championships 2012 in Ruhpolding, Berger took two golds in the 15 km individual and the 12.5 km mass start.

At the Biathlon World Championships 2013 in Nove Mesto, she won medals in every event she entered, taking gold in the mixed relay, silver in the sprint and gold in the pursuit before becoming the first woman to defend her 15k individual title. She followed this up with a stunning final-leg performance in the relay, making up a deficit of nearly 40 seconds on the leaders to take another gold medal, before taking silver in the mass start. As the holder of 18 world championship medals she is second in the table of total medals, one medal behind Uschi Disl. At the same championships, she also became the first biathlete (male or female) to win 6 medals at a single biathlon world championships, with four golds and two silvers.

Berger competed in Biathlon at the 2014 Winter Olympics in Sochi where she won 3 medals. Gold in the Mixed relay together with Tiril Eckhoff, Ole Einar Bjørndalen and Emil Hegle Svendsen, a silver in the Women's Pursuit, and a silver in the Women's relay.

== IBU World Cup ==
Although Tora Berger had been part of the Norwegian women's biathlon team since 1999, up until the end of the 2011–12 season she had never been the world cup winner either overall or in any of the individual disciplines. Her highest finish was third in the overall standings in the 2008–09 and 2011–12 seasons, second in the Pursuit discipline in the 2008–09 season, and second in the Mass Start discipline in the 2011–12 season.

Success came in the 2012–13 World Cup season, with Tora taking 11 wins and missing the podium only seven times. Her 19 podium finishes equalled Magdalena Forsberg's record for the highest number of podium finishes in a single season. She won all three races at Oslo Holmenkollen to secure the crystal globes for both the Overall women's world cup and the Pursuit discipline. By the end of the season she had also won the crystal globe for the Individual, Sprint and Mass Start disciplines, completing a clean sweep of the five women's crystal globes (a feat last achieved by Magdalena Forsberg in the 2001–02 season). With Berger's contribution, Norway also won the 2012/13 season's Women's Nation Cup, Women's Relay Cup and Mixed Relay Cup.

| Season | Overall | | | Sprint | | | Pursuit | | | Individual | | | Mass Start | | |
| Season | Races | Points | Position | Races | Points | Position | Races | Points | Position | Races | Points | Position | Races | Points | Position |
|---|---|---|---|---|---|---|---|---|---|---|---|---|---|---|---|
| 2002–03 | 11/23 | 1 | 68th | 5/9 | 1 | 65th | 4/7 | – | – | 2/3 | – | – | 0/4 | – | – |
| 2003–04 | - | - | - | – | – | – | – | – | – | – | – | – | – | – | – |
| 2004–05 | 26/27 | 389 | 17th | 10/10 | 160 | 13th | 8/9 | 102 | 21st | 4/4 | 64 | 14th | 4/4 | 47 | 21st |
| 2005–06 | 20/26 | 253 | 22nd | 9/10 | 104 | 22nd | 6/8 | 75 | 26th | 2/3 | 20 | 33rd | 3/5 | 54 | 23rd |
| 2006–07 | 25/27 | 450 | 14th | 9/10 | 175 | 12th | 8/8 | 124 | 16th | 3/4 | 92 | 5th | 5/5 | 53 | 24th |
| 2007–08 | 24/26 | 664 | 6th | 9/10 | 271 | 6th | 8/8 | 238 | 4th | 2/3 | 40 | 15th | 5/5 | 102 | 12th |
| 2008–09 | 23/26 | 894 | 3rd | 9/10 | 352 | 3rd | 7/7 | 246 | 2nd | 3/4 | 122 | 3rd | 4/5 | 146 | 6th |
| 2009–10 | 20/25 | 564 | 12th | 9/10 | 215 | 15th | 4/6 | 101 | 24th | 2/4 | 87 | 13th | 5/5 | 139 | 9th |
| 2010–11 | 24/26 | 963 | 4th | 9/10 | 356 | 3rd | 6/7 | 268 | 4th | 4/4 | 133 | 4th | 5/5 | 206 | 3rd |
| 2011–12 | 26/26 | 1054 | 3rd | 10/10 | 373 | 4th | 8/8 | 361 | 3rd | 3/3 | 108 | 5th | 5/5 | 241 | 2nd |
| 2012–13 | 26/26 | 1234 | 1st | 10/10 | 428 | 1st | 8/8 | 417 | 1st | 3/3 | 168 | 1st | 5/5 | 262 | 1st |
| 2013–14 | 22/22 | 856 | 1st | 9/9 | 361 | 2nd | 8/8 | 319 | 2nd | 2/2 | 58 | 9th | 3/3 | 121 | 4th |

*Key:Races—number of entered races/all races; Points—World Cup points; Position—World Cup season ranking.

== Biathlon results ==
=== Olympic Games ===
| Event | Individual | Sprint | Pursuit | Mass start | Relay | Mixed relay |
|---|---|---|---|---|---|---|
| (Italy) 2006 Turin | 13th | 23rd | 18th | 25th | 5th | — |
| (Canada) 2010 Vancouver | Gold | 33rd | 5th | 18th | 4th | — |
| (Russia) 2014 Sochi | 16th | 10th | Silver | 14th | Silver | Gold |

=== World Championships ===
- 18 medals – (8 gold, 5 silver, 5 bronze)

| Event | Individual | Sprint | Pursuit | Mass start | Relay | Mixed relay |
|---|---|---|---|---|---|---|
| (Austria) 2005 Hochfilzen | 21st | 11th | 19th | 13th | 5th | — |
| (Russia) 2005 Khanty-Mansiysk | — | — | — | — | — | 10th |
| (Slovenia) 2006 Pokljuka | — | — | — | — | — | Silver |
| (Italy) 2007 Antholz-Anterselva | 4th | 10th | 19th | 25th | Bronze | Bronze |
| (Sweden) 2008 Östersund | 4th | 4th | 4th | Silver | 6th | — |
| (South Korea) 2009 Pyeongchang | Bronze | 19th | 9th | 15th | 11th | 4th |
| (Russia) 2010 Khanty-Mansiysk | — | — | — | — | — | Silver |
| (Russia) 2011 Khanty-Mansiysk | 10th | 7th | 5th | Bronze | 5th | Gold |
| (Germany) 2012 Ruhpolding | Gold | 6th | 4th | Gold | Bronze | Gold |
| (Czech Republic) 2013 Nové Město | Gold | Silver | Gold | Silver | Gold | Gold |

=== Junior/Youth World Championships ===
| Event | Individual | Sprint | Pursuit | Relay |
|---|---|---|---|---|
| (Austria) 2000 Hochfilzen | 13th | Bronze | 9th | 5th |
| (Russia) 2001 Khanty-Mansiysk | 21st | 24th | 38th | 5th |

=== Individual victories ===
28 victories (7 Sp, 9 Pu, 5 In, 7 MS)

| Season | Date | Location | Discipline | Level |
|---|---|---|---|---|
| 2007/08; 2 victories (1 Sp, 1 Pu) | 2 December 2007 | (Finland) Kontiolahti | 10 km Pursuit | Biathlon World Cup |
| 2007/08; 2 victories (1 Sp, 1 Pu) | 5 January 2008 | (Germany) Oberhof | 7.5 km Sprint | Biathlon World Cup |
| 2008/09; 2 victories (1 Sp, 1 MS) | 22 January 2009 | (Italy) Antholz | 7.5 km Sprint | Biathlon World Cup |
| 2008/09; 2 victories (1 Sp, 1 MS) | 22 March 2009 | (Norway) Trondheim | 12.5 km Mass Start | Biathlon World Cup |
| 2009/10; 2 victories (1 Sp, 1 In) | 5 December 2009 | (Sweden) Östersund | 7.5 km Sprint | Biathlon World Cup |
| 2009/10; 2 victories (1 Sp, 1 In) | 18 February 2010 | (Canada) Vancouver | 15 km Individual | Winter Olympic Games |
| 2010/11; 6 victories (2 Sp, 2 Pu, 1 In, 1 MS) | 16 December 2010 | (Slovenia) Pokljuka | 15 km Individual | Biathlon World Cup |
| 2010/11; 6 victories (2 Sp, 2 Pu, 1 In, 1 MS) | 15 January 2011 | (Germany) Ruhpolding | 7.5 km Sprint | Biathlon World Cup |
| 2010/11; 6 victories (2 Sp, 2 Pu, 1 In, 1 MS) | 16 January 2011 | (Germany) Ruhpolding | 10 km Pursuit | Biathlon World Cup |
| 2010/11; 6 victories (2 Sp, 2 Pu, 1 In, 1 MS) | 21 January 2011 | (Italy) Antholz | 7.5 km Sprint | Biathlon World Cup |
| 2010/11; 6 victories (2 Sp, 2 Pu, 1 In, 1 MS) | 22 January 2011 | (Italy) Antholz | 12.5 km Mass Start | Biathlon World Cup |
| 2010/11; 6 victories (2 Sp, 2 Pu, 1 In, 1 MS) | 6 February 2011 | (United States) Presque Isle, Maine | 10 km Pursuit | Biathlon World Cup |
| 2011/12; 4 victories (2 Pu, 1 In, 1 MS) | 4 December 2011 | (Sweden) Östersund | 10 km Pursuit | Biathlon World Cup |
| 2011/12; 4 victories (2 Pu, 1 In, 1 MS) | 15 January 2012 | (Czech Republic) Nové Město | 10 km Pursuit | Biathlon World Cup |
| 2011/12; 4 victories (2 Pu, 1 In, 1 MS) | 7 March 2012 | (Germany) Ruhpolding | 15 km Individual | Biathlon World Championships |
| 2011/12; 4 victories (2 Pu, 1 In, 1 MS) | 11 March 2012 | (Germany) Ruhpolding | 12.5 km Mass Start | Biathlon World Championships |
| 2012/13; 11 victories (2 Sp, 4 Pu, 2 In, 3 MS) | 29 November 2012 | (Sweden) Östersund | 15 km Individual | Biathlon World Cup |
| 2012/13; 11 victories (2 Sp, 4 Pu, 2 In, 3 MS) | 1 December 2012 | (Sweden) Östersund | 7.5 km Sprint | Biathlon World Cup |
| 2012/13; 11 victories (2 Sp, 4 Pu, 2 In, 3 MS) | 2 December 2012 | (Sweden) Östersund | 10 km Pursuit | Biathlon World Cup |
| 2012/13; 11 victories (2 Sp, 4 Pu, 2 In, 3 MS) | 16 December 2012 | (Slovenia) Pokljuka | 12.5 km Mass Start | Biathlon World Cup |
| 2012/13; 11 victories (2 Sp, 4 Pu, 2 In, 3 MS) | 13 January 2013 | (Germany) Ruhpolding | 12.5 km Mass Start | Biathlon World Cup |
| 2012/13; 11 victories (2 Sp, 4 Pu, 2 In, 3 MS) | 19 January 2013 | (Italy) Antholz | 10 km Pursuit | Biathlon World Cup |
| 2012/13; 11 victories (2 Sp, 4 Pu, 2 In, 3 MS) | 10 February 2013 | (Czech Republic) Nové Město | 10 km Pursuit | Biathlon World Championships |
| 2012/13; 11 victories (2 Sp, 4 Pu, 2 In, 3 MS) | 13 February 2013 | (Czech Republic) Nové Město | 15 km Individual | Biathlon World Championships |
| 2012/13; 11 victories (2 Sp, 4 Pu, 2 In, 3 MS) | 1 March 2013 | (Norway) Oslo | 7.5 km Sprint | Biathlon World Cup |
| 2012/13; 11 victories (2 Sp, 4 Pu, 2 In, 3 MS) | 2 March 2013 | (Norway) Oslo | 10 km Pursuit | Biathlon World Cup |
| 2012/13; 11 victories (2 Sp, 4 Pu, 2 In, 3 MS) | 3 March 2013 | (Norway) Oslo | 12.5 km Mass Start | Biathlon World Cup |
| 2013/14; 1 victory (1 MS) | 5 January 2014 | (Germany) Oberhof | 12.5 km Mass Start | Biathlon World Cup |

*Results are from IBU races which include the Biathlon World Cup, Biathlon World Championships and the Winter Olympic Games.

== Cross-country skiing results ==
All results are sourced from the International Ski Federation (FIS).

=== World Cup ===
==== Season standings ====
| Season | Age | Discipline standings | | | Ski Tour standings | | |
| Season | Age | Overall | Distance | Sprint | Nordic Opening | Tour de Ski | World Cup Final |
|---|---|---|---|---|---|---|---|
| 2012 | 31 | 61 | 46 | — | — | — | — |

==== Team podiums ====
- 1 podium – (1 RL)

| No. | Season | Date | Location | Race | Level | Place | Teammates |
|---|---|---|---|---|---|---|---|
| 1 | 2011–12 | 20 November 2011 | Sjusjøen, Norway | 4 × 5 km Relay C/F | World Cup | 2nd | Jacobsen / Østberg / Kristoffersen |

== Awards and nominations ==
- 2013: Awarded the Holmenkollen medal
- 2013: Winner of Norwegian Sportsperson of the Year 2012
- 2013: Winner of the "Female athlete of the year" for 2012 at the Sports Gala 2013
- 2013: Nominated for the "Name of the year" for 2012 at the Sports Gala 2013
- 2012: Nominated for the "Female athlete of the year" for 2011 at the Sports Gala 2012
- 2011: Nominated for "Name of the year" for 2010 at the Sports Gala 2011
- 2011: Nominated for "Female athlete of the year" for 2010 at the Sports Gala 2011
- 2010: Nominated for "Female athlete of the year" for 2009 at the Sports Gala 2010

Awards
| Preceded by Alexander Dale Oen | Norwegian Sportsperson of the Year; 2012 | Succeeded by Magnus Carlsen |
