= Marie-Laure Brunet =

French biathlete (born 1988)

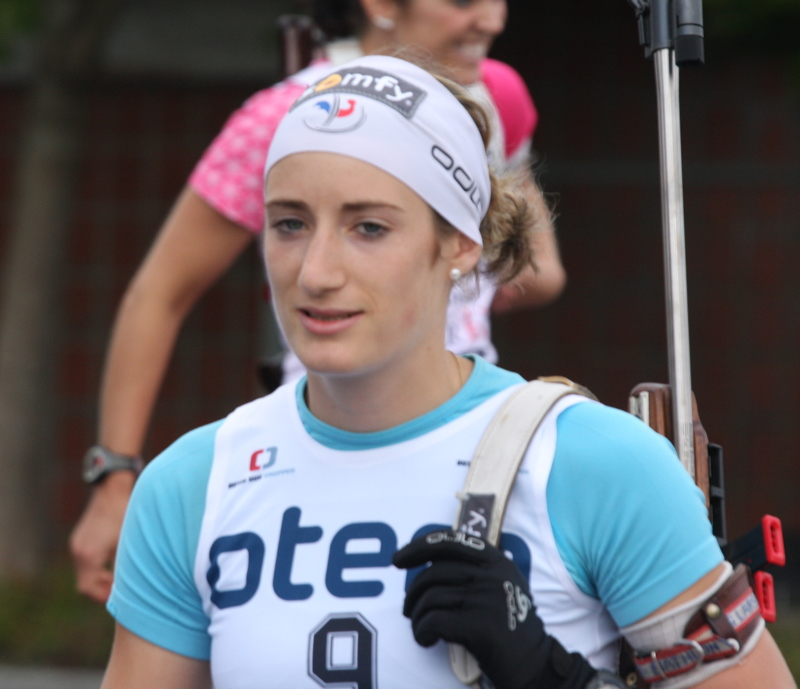

Personal information
- Full name: Marie-Laure Brunet
- Born: 20 November 1988 (age 37) Lannemezan, Hautes-Pyrénées, France
- Height: 1.66 m (5 ft 5 in)
- Website: marielaurebrunet.com

Sport

Professional information
- Sport: Biathlon
- Club: Douanes Autrans
- World Cup debut: 29 November 2007
- Retired: 8 June 2014

Olympic Games
- Teams: 2 (2010, 2014)
- Medals: 2 (0 gold)

World Championships
- Teams: 6 (2008, 2009, 2010, 2011, 2012, 2013)
- Medals: 9 (1 gold)

World Cup
- Seasons: 7 (2007/08–2013/14)
- Individual victories: 0
- All victories: 2
- Individual podiums: 10
- All podiums: 33
Medal record
Women's biathlon
Representing France
Olympic Games
| Silver medal – second place | 2010 Vancouver | 4 × 6 km relay |
| Bronze medal – third place | 2010 Vancouver | 10 km pursuit |
World Championships
| Gold medal – first place | 2009 Pyeongchang | Mixed relay |
| Silver medal – second place | 2011 Khanty-Mansiysk | 4 × 6 km relay |
| Silver medal – second place | 2012 Ruhpolding | 15 km individual |
| Silver medal – second place | 2012 Ruhpolding | 12.5 km mass start |
| Silver medal – second place | 2012 Ruhpolding | 4 × 6 km relay |
| Silver medal – second place | 2013 Nové Město | Mixed relay |
| Bronze medal – third place | 2008 Östersund | 4 × 6 km relay |
| Bronze medal – third place | 2009 Pyeongchang | 4 × 6 km relay |
| Bronze medal – third place | 2011 Khanty-Mansiysk | Mixed relay |
Junior World Championships
| Silver medal – second place | 2008 Ruhpolding | 12.5 km individual |
| Silver medal – second place | 2008 Ruhpolding | 3 × 6 km relay |
| Bronze medal – third place | 2008 Ruhpolding | 10 km pursuit |
Youth World Championships
| Gold medal – first place | 2007 Martell | 7.5 km pursuit |
| Gold medal – first place | 2007 Martell | 3 × 6 km relay |
| Silver medal – second place | 2007 Martell | 10 km individual |

Marie-Laure Brunet (born 20 November 1988 in Lannemezan, Hautes-Pyrénées) is a retired French biathlete and Olympic athlete who won a bronze medal in the women's pursuit at the 2010 Winter Olympic Games of Vancouver.

Brunet made her Biathlon World Cup debut in March 2007 at Kontiolahti, shortly after winning a gold medal in the pursuit event at the Youth World Championships. During her career she developed a reputation as one of the most accurate shooters on the biathlon circuit. Brunet announced her retirement in June 2014 after suffering health problems, including collapsing during the relay at the 2014 Olympics.

== Biathlon results ==
=== Olympics ===
2 medals (1 silver, 1 bronze)

| Event | Individual | Sprint | Pursuit | Mass start | Relay | Mixed relay |
|---|---|---|---|---|---|---|
| (Canada) 2010 Vancouver | 12th | 6th | Bronze | 14th | Silver | —N/a |
| (Russia) 2014 Sochi | 16th | 55th | DNS | — | DNF | — |

*The mixed relay was added as an event in 2014.

=== World Championships ===
9 medals (1 gold, 5 silver, 3 bronze)

| Event | Individual | Sprint | Pursuit | Mass start | Relay | Mixed relay |
|---|---|---|---|---|---|---|
| (Sweden) 2008 Östersund | — | 30th | 26th | — | Bronze | 7th |
| (South Korea) 2009 Pyeongchang | 15th | 52nd | 7th | 8th | Bronze | Gold |
| (Russia) 2010 Khanty-Mansiysk | —N/a | —N/a | —N/a | —N/a | —N/a | 5th |
| (Russia) 2011 Khanty-Mansiysk | DNF | 43rd | DNS | 8th | Silver | Bronze |
| (Germany) 2012 Ruhpolding | Silver | 5th | 6th | Silver | Silver | 11th |
| (Czech Republic) 2013 Nové Město | 19th | 26th | 11th | 28th | 6th | Silver |

*During Olympic seasons competitions are only held for those events not included in the Olympic program.

=== World Cup ===
Relay victories

2 victories

| No. | Season | Date | Location | Discipline | Level | Team |
|---|---|---|---|---|---|---|
| 1 | 2008–09 | 19 February 2009 | (South Korea) Pyeongchang | Mixed Relay | Biathlon World Championships | Brunet / Becaert / Defrasne / S.Fourcade |
| 2 | 2011–12 | 21 January 2012 | (Italy) Antholz-Anterselva | Relay | Biathlon World Cup | Brunet / Boilley / Bescond / Dorin Habert |
