= Kaisa Mäkäräinen =

Finnish biathlete

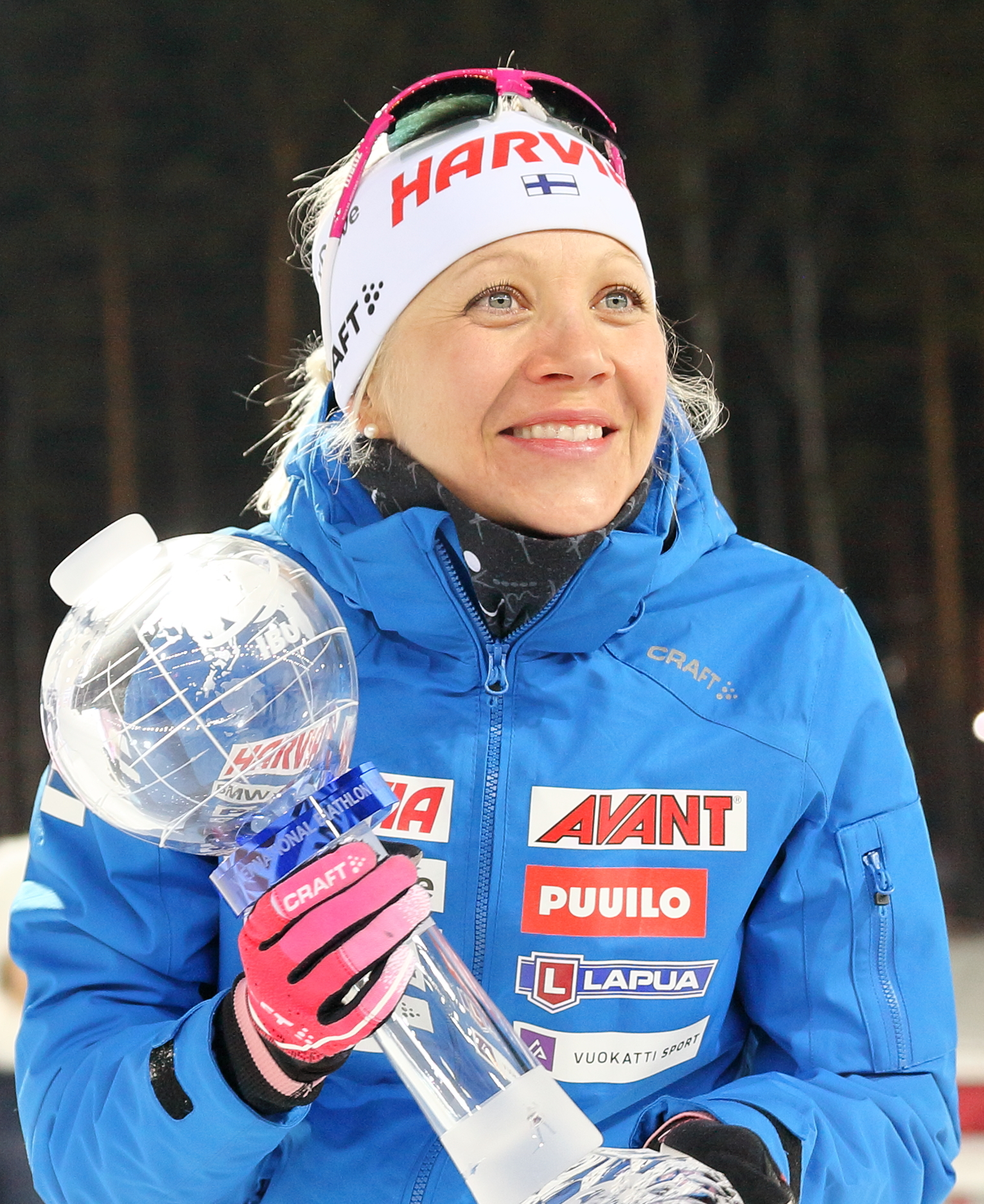

Personal information
- Full name: Kaisa-Leena Mäkäräinen
- Nickname: Kappa
- Born: 11 January 1983 (age 43) Ristijärvi, Finland
- Height: 1.71 m (5 ft 7 in)
- Website: kaisamakarainen.fi

Sport

Professional information
- Sport: Biathlon
- Club: Kontiolahden Urheilijat
- Skis: Fischer
- Rifle: Anschütz
- World Cup debut: 5 March 2005
- Retired: 14 March 2020

Olympic Games
- Teams: 3 (2010, 2014, 2018)
- Medals: 0

World Championships
- Teams: 13 (2005, 2006, 2007, 2008, 2009, 2010, 2011, 2012, 2013, 2015, 2016, 2017, 2019)
- Medals: 6 (1 gold)

World Cup
- Seasons: 16 (2004/05–2019/2020)
- Individual victories: 27
- Individual podiums: 85
- Overall titles: 3 (2010–11, 2013–14, 2017-18)
- Discipline titles: 6: 1 Individual (2014–15); 1 Sprint (2013–14); 3 Pursuit (2010–11, 2013–14, 2014–15); 1 Mass Start (2017-18)
Medal record
Women's biathlon
Representing Finland
World Championships
Gold medal – first place	2011 Khanty-Mansiysk	10 km pursuit
Silver medal – second place	2011 Khanty-Mansiysk	7.5 km sprint
Bronze medal – third place	2012 Ruhpolding	12.5 km mass start
Bronze medal – third place	2015 Kontiolahti	15 km individual
Bronze medal – third place	2016 Oslo	12.5 km mass start
Bronze medal – third place	2017 Hochfilzen	12.5 km mass start
- Updated on 16 February 2018

Kaisa Leena Mäkäräinen (born 11 January 1983) is a Finnish former world-champion and 3-time world-cup-winning biathlete, who currently competes for Kontiolahden Urheilijat. Outside sports, Mäkäräinen is currently studying to be a Physics teacher at the University of Eastern Finland in Joensuu. Her team coach is Jonne Kähkönen, while Jarmo Punkkinen is her ski coach.

== Career ==
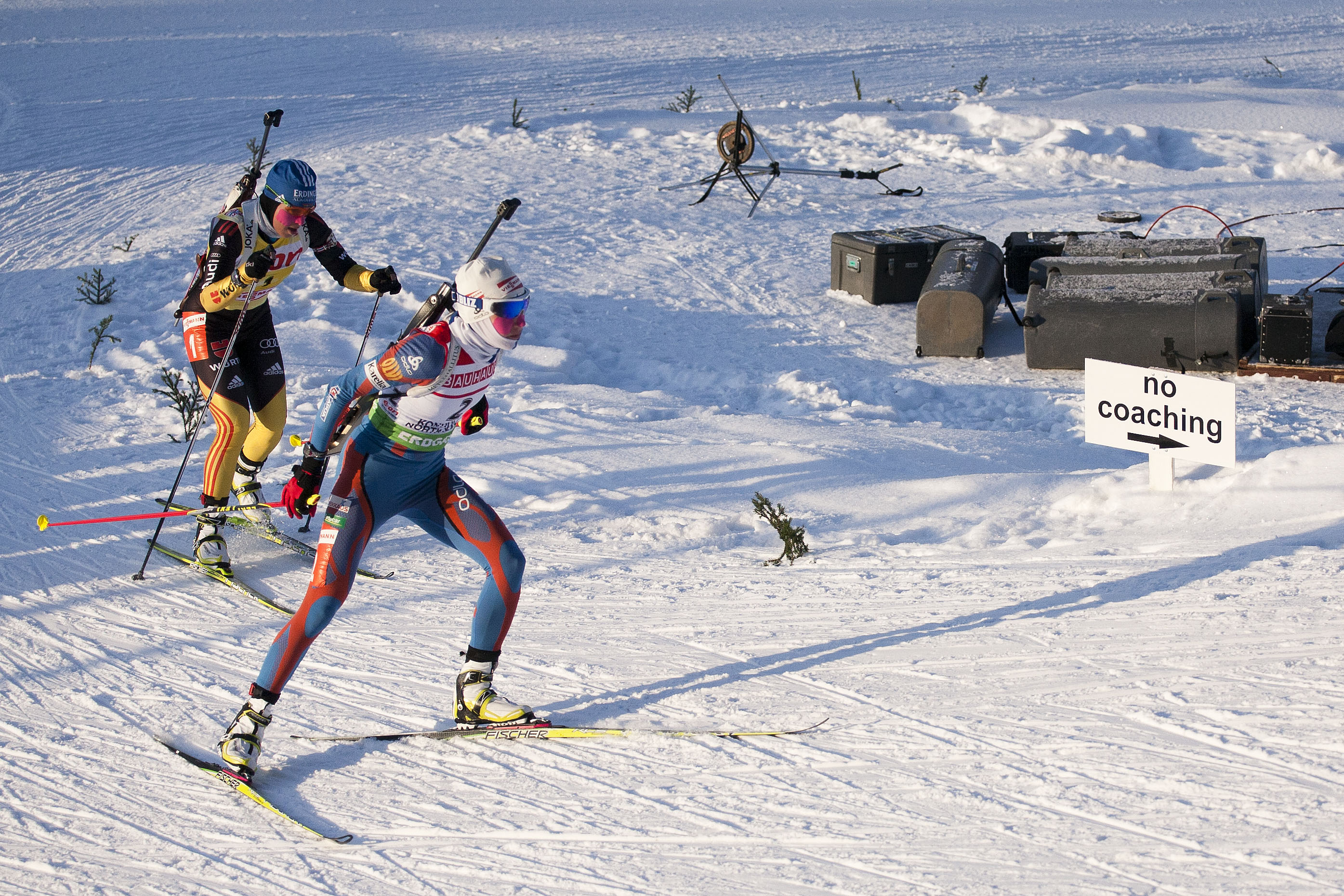
Kaisa Mäkäräinen (leading) Kontiolahti, Finland, 12 February 2012

Mäkäräinen was originally a cross-country skier and focused on this until the age of twenty. She started training for the biathlon in 2003. In 2004, she made the Finnish National Team. 2005 saw Mäkäräinen compete at the Biathlon World Championships for the first time. Her best placings in the Biathlon World Championships have occurred at the 2007 World Championships in Antholz-Anterselva, where she placed eighth in the individual 15 and seventh in the mass start events. At the 2008 Biathlon World Championships in Östersund, she was 15th in the mass start. During the 2007-08 Biathlon World Cup, she made it to the podium twice, the first time when she placed second in the sprint at Pokljuka, Slovenia and third in the pursuit at Ruhpolding, Germany. During the 2008–09 Biathlon World Cup, she has steadily risen in the rankings and on she placed second during the pursuit event and third in the mass start after Iourieva and Jonsson at Antholz.

Her best season so far has been the 2010-11 Biathlon World Cup. She made a strong start at the opening event in Östersund, where Mäkäräinen won her first ever World Cup victory in the sprint. Two days later she repeated her success by winning the pursuit, too. She showed her strong early-season form again in Hochfilzen and Pokljuka by reaching the podium in every single event.

Mäkäräinen's form fell somewhat after that as she managed to reach the podium only once in the next 12 starts. Despite this Mäkäräinen scored valuable points in every single race beside the mass start in Antholz. She entered the Biathlon World Championships 2011 in Khanty-Mansiysk in second place for the Overall World Cup (9 points behind Andrea Henkel), but regained the overall World Cup leader's yellow bib after taking the silver medal in the sprint. Mäkäräinen's flawless shooting and fourth-fastest course time secured her career-first gold medal in the pursuit the following day. Mäkäräinen became the second Finnish female to medal in biathlon and the first one since 1987 when Tuija Vuoksiala placed third in the individual . She is also the first Finnish biathlete to medal at the Biathlon World Championships since 2003, since Paavo Puurunen's bronze in the pursuit.

Despite her not-so-good performance in the individual competition and being tied for the overall lead by Helena Ekholm, Mäkäräinen managed to stay on top of the Overall World Cup classification until the very end of the season. In Holmenkollen she grabbed both the Overall and the Pursuit Titles. She was subsequently named the 2011 Finnish Sports Personality of the Year.

She has gone on to win two more overall World Cups, in 2013-14 and 2017-18.

Mäkäräinen has also competed in the FIS Cross-Country World Cup, and she finished 14th in the 10km freestyle event at the 2013 Nordic Skiing World Championships. She was also the 2013 Finnish national champion in the same event. She has continued competing in the national cross-country skiing championships even during her retirement. In January 2021, she notably won a silver medal in a 10 km freestyle competition, with only a few of Finland's current World Cup skiers absent from the event.

== Biathlon results ==
All results are sourced from the International Biathlon Union.

=== Olympic Games ===
0 medals

Event	Individual	Sprint	Pursuit	Mass start	Relay	Mixed relay^{[a]}
(Canada) 2010 Vancouver	46th	59th	45th	—	—	—N/a
(Russia) 2014 Sochi	9th	30th	16th	6th	—	—
(South Korea) 2018 Pyeongchang	13th	25th	22nd	10th	15th	6th

a. ^{1} The mixed relay was added as an event in 2014.

=== World Championships ===
6 medals (1 gold, 1 silver, 4 bronze)

Event	Individual	Sprint	Pursuit	Mass start	Relay	Mixed relay	Single mixed relay
(Austria) 2005 Hochfilzen	49th	73rd	—	—	18th	—	—N/a
(Slovenia) 2006 Pokljuka^{[a]}	—N/a	—N/a	—N/a	—N/a	—N/a	19th	—N/a
(Italy) 2007 Antholz	8th	29th	25th	7th	12th	16th	—N/a
(Sweden) 2008 Östersund	31st	55th	DNS	15th	15th	10th	—N/a
(South Korea) 2009 Pyeongchang	30th	23rd	4th	17th	—	6th	—N/a
(Russia) 2010 Khanty-Mansiysk^{[a]}	—N/a	—N/a	—N/a	—N/a	—N/a	18th	—N/a
(Russia) 2011 Khanty-Mansiysk	28th	Silver	Gold	4th	10th	9th	—N/a
(Germany) 2012 Ruhpolding	28th	27th	20th	Bronze	18th	16th	—N/a
(Czech Republic) 2013 Nové Město	8th	9th	10th	17th	21st	19th	—N/a
(Finland) 2015 Kontiolahti	Bronze	35th	12th	15th	17th	9th	—N/a
(Norway) 2016 Oslo	19th	9th	7th	Bronze	17th	18th	—N/a
(Austria) 2017 Hochfilzen	15th	12th	7th	Bronze	15th	10th	—N/a
(Sweden) 2019 Östersund	45th	12th	17th	23rd	—	10th	12th
(Italy) 2020 Antholz	21st	40th	22nd	14th	11th	9th	—

a. ^{1} ^{2} During Olympic seasons "Mixed-Relay Championships" were held for those events not included in the Olympic program.
b. The single mixed relay was added as an event in 2019.

=== Junior/Youth World Championships ===
Event	Individual	Sprint	Pursuit	Relay
(France) 2004 Haute-Maurienne	23rd	51st	39th	—

=== World Cup standings ===
Season	Age	Overall			Sprint			Pursuit			Individual			Mass start		
Season	Age	Races	Points^{[a]}	Position	Races	Points^{[b]}	Position	Races	Points^{[b]}	Position	Races	Points^{[b]}	Position	Races	Points^{[b]}	Position
2004/05	22	2/27	0	—N/a	1/10	0	—N/a	0/9	0	—N/a	1/4	0	—N/a	0/4	0	—N/a
2005/06	23	15/26	18	62nd	9/10	10	63rd	5/8	4	63rd	1/3	4	54th	0/5	0	—N/a
2006/07	24	22/27	230	27th	8/10	60	29th	6/8	16	47th	3/4	78	8th	5/5	74	16th
2007/08	25	23/26	386	13th	9/10	178	10th	6/8	108	15th	3/3	11	43rd	5/5	80	14th
2008/09	26	24/26	577	14th	9/10	192	17th	7/7	178	10th	3/4	47	27th	5/5	140	9th
2009/10	27	22/25	418	22nd	10/10	202	17th	5/6	84	28th	3/4	26	43rd	4/5	106	16th
2010/11	28	26/26	1005	1st	10/10	391	2nd	7/7	343	1st	4/4	131	6th	5/5	140	8th
2011/12	29	26/26	1007	4th	10/10	401	3rd	8/8	330	4th	3/3	116	2nd	5/5	187	5th
2012/13	30	26/26	834	5th	10/10	324	5th	8/8	255	5th	3/3	104	6th	5/5	171	5th
2013/14	31	22/22	861	1st	9/9	368	1st	8/8	350	1st	2/2	31	20th	3/3	130	3rd
2014/15	32	25/25	1044	2nd	10/10	364	2nd	7/7	348	1st	3/3	162	1st	5/5	193	5th
2015/16	33	24/25	892	4th	9/9	309	4th	8/8	324	4th	3/3	93	8th	4/5	179	4th
2016/17	34	26/26	971	3rd	9/9	337	3rd	9/9	368	3rd	3/3	69	11th	5/5	207	3rd
2017/18	35	22/22	822	1st	8/8	258	3rd	7/7	280	2nd	2/2	84	3rd	5/5	216	1st
2018/19	36	25/25	673	7th	9/9	280	5th	8/8	286	5th	3/3	11	57th	5/5	96	21st
2019/20	37	21/21	506	11th	8/8	117	23rd	5/5	146	7th	3/3	48	21st	5/5	195	4th

a. ^{1} Until 2009–10 season, IBU did not count an athlete's three worst races in overall World Cup scores. In 2010–11 season, all races were included in World Cup scores. Starting from 2011–12 season, the two worst results have been eliminated again. So the points in the "Points" column is represented after deduction, except 2010–11 season.
b. ^{1} ^{2} ^{3} ^{4} Until 2009–10 season it was required to leave out the result of the worst discipline race for the final result of discipline world cup (if there were four discipline races or more during the season), so the points in the "Points" columns for those seasons is represented after deduction of the result of the worst discipline race.

=== Individual victories ===
- 27 victories – (8 Sp, 13 Pu, 2 In, 4 MS)

No.	Season	Date	Location	Discipline	Level
1	2010/11	3 December 2010	Östersund, Sweden	7.5 km Sprint	World Cup
2	2010/11	5 December 2010	Östersund, Sweden	10 km Pursuit	World Cup
3	2010/11	6 March 2011	Khanty-Mansiysk, Russia	10 km Pursuit	World Championships
4	2011/12	11 January 2012	Nové Město, Czech Republic	15 km Individual	World Cup
5	2011/12	12 February 2012	Kontiolahti, Finland	10 km Pursuit	World Cup
6	2013/14	8 March 2014	Pokljuka, Slovenia	10 km Pursuit	World Cup
7	2013/14	13 March 2014	Kontiolahti, Finland	7.5 km Sprint	World Cup
8	2013/14	15 March 2014	Kontiolahti, Finland	7.5 km Sprint	World Cup
9	2013/14	16 March 2014	Kontiolahti, Finland	10 km Pursuit	World Cup
10	2014/15	7 December 2014	Östersund, Sweden	10 km Pursuit	World Cup
11	2014/15	12 December 2014	Hochfilzen, Austria	7.5 km Sprint	World Cup
12	2014/15	14 December 2014	Hochfilzen, Austria	10 km Pursuit	World Cup
13	2014/15	21 December 2014	Pokljuka, Slovenia	12.5 km Mass Start	World Cup
14	2014/15	12 February 2015	Holmenkollen, Norway	15 km Individual	World Cup
15	2014/15	20 March 2015	Khanty-Mansiysk, Russia	7.5 km Sprint	World Cup
16	2015/16	6 December 2015	Östersund, Sweden	10 km Pursuit	World Cup
17	2015/16	20 December 2015	Pokljuka, Slovenia	12.5 km Mass Start	World Cup
18	2015/16	17 March 2016	Khanty-Mansiysk, Russia	7.5 km Sprint	World Cup
19	2015/16	19 March 2016	Khanty-Mansiysk, Russia	10 km Pursuit	World Cup
20	2016/17	14 January 2017	Ruhpolding, Germany	7.5 km Sprint	World Cup
21	2016/17	15 January 2017	Ruhpolding, Germany	10 km Pursuit	World Cup
22	2017/18	14 January 2018	Ruhpolding, Germany	12.5 km Mass Start	World Cup
23	2017/18	24 March 2018	Tyumen, Russia	10 km Pursuit	World Cup
24	2018/19	8 December 2018	Pokljuka, Slovenia	7.5 km Sprint	World Cup
25	2018/19	9 December 2018	Pokljuka, Slovenia	10 km Pursuit	World Cup
26	2018/19	15 December 2018	Hochfilzen, Austria	10 km Pursuit	World Cup
27	2019/20	12 January 2020	Oberhof, Germany	12.5 km Mass Start	World Cup

* Results are from UIPMB and IBU races which include the Biathlon World Cup, Biathlon World Championships and the Winter Olympic Games.

=== Overall record ===
Result	Individual	Sprint	Pursuit	Mass Start	Relay	Mixed Relay^{[a]}	Total		
Result	Individual	Sprint	Pursuit	Mass Start	Relay	Mixed Relay^{[a]}	Individual Events	Team Events	All Events
1st place	2	8	13	4	–	–	26	–	26
2nd place	4	15	11	2	–	–	32	–	32
3rd place	1	7	8	7	–	–	23	–	23
Podiums	7	29	31	12	–	–	81	–	81
Top 10	16	65	54	34	7	12	169	19	188
Points^{[b]}	33	109	85	57	38	26	284	64	348
Others	7	17	9	–	–	–	33	–	33
DNF	–	–	–	–	1	–	–	1	1
DSQ	–	–	–	1	–	–	1	–	1
Starts	40	126	94	58	39	26	316	65	383

a. ^{1} Includes mixed relay and single mixed relay, the event involves one male and one female biathlete each completing two legs consisting of one prone and one standing shoot.
b. ^{1} Until 2007–08 season, top-30 were awarded with World Cup points and biathlete got 50 points for the win. Starting from 2008–09 season another points system is applied in World Cup, top-40 are awarded with World Cup points and winner got 60 points. Results in "Points" row is represented according to the applied scoring system in corresponding season.

Statistics as of 15 December 2018

=== Shooting ===
Shooting	2004–05 season		2005–06 season		2006–07 season		2007–08 season		2008–09 season		2009–10 season		2010–11 season		2011–12 season	
Prone position	17 / 23	73.9%	114 / 137	83.2%	163 / 193	84.5%	163 / 194	84.0%	185 / 219	84.5%	165 / 199	82.9%	212 / 243	87.2%	191 / 239	79.9%
Standing position	10 / 23	43.5%	100 / 140	71.4%	147 / 191	77.0%	149 / 191	78.0%	175 / 218	80.3%	161 / 204	78.9%	201 / 245	82.0%	197 / 240	82.1%
Total	27 / 46	58.7%	214 / 277	77.3%	310 / 384	80.7%	312 / 385	81.0%	360 / 437	82.4%	326 / 403	80.9%	413 / 488	84.6%	388 / 479	81.0%

Shooting	2012–13 season		2013–14 season		2014–15 season		2015–16 season		2016–17 season		2017–18 season		2018–19 season	Career	
Prone position	205 / 246	83.3%	212 / 234	90.6%	189 / 223	84.8%	198 / 235	84.3%	225 / 262	85.9%	203 / 236	86.0%		2442 / 2883	84.7%
Standing position	176 / 252	69.8%	180 / 233	77.3%	182 / 222	82.0%	192 / 233	82.4%	211 / 263	80.2%	200 / 239	83.7%		2281 / 2894	78.8%
Total	381 / 498	76.5%	392 / 467	83.9%	371 / 445	83.4%	390 / 468	83.3%	436 / 525	83.0%	403 / 475	84.8%		4723 / 5777	81.8%

Results in all IBU World Cup races, Olympics and World Championships including relay events and disqualified races. Statistics as of 25 March 2018.

== Cross-country skiing results ==
All results are sourced from the International Ski Federation (FIS).

=== World Championships ===
Year	Age	10 km individual	15 km skiathlon	30 km mass start	Sprint	4 × 5 km relay	Team sprint
2013	30	14	—	—	—	—	—

=== World Cup ===
==== Season standings ====
Season	Age	Discipline standings			Ski Tour standings		
Season	Age	Overall	Distance	Sprint	Nordic Opening	Tour de Ski	World Cup Final
2009	26	130	94	—	—N/a	—	—
2010	27	NC	NC	—	—N/a	—	—
2014	31	88	57	—	—	—	—

== Roller-ski biathlon ==
In the summer of 2007, Mäkäräinen won the world championship in roller-ski biathlon at Otepää in both the 7.5 km sprint and the 10 km pursuit.
