= Anastasiya Kuzmina =

Russian-Slovak biathlete (born 1984)

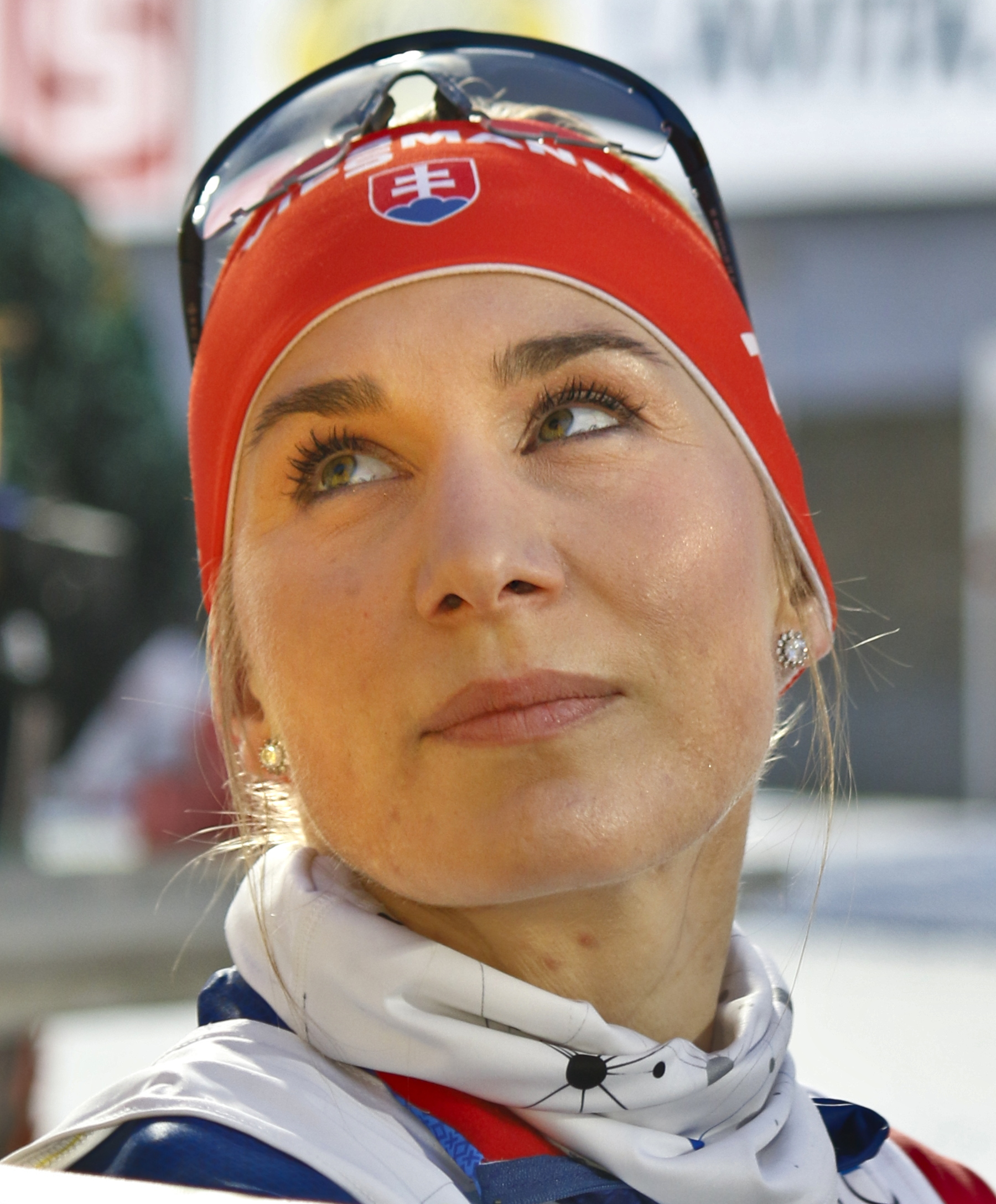
- Kuzmina in 2024

Personal information
- Full name: Anastasiya Vladimirovna Kuzmina
- Nationality: Slovak
- Born: Anastasiya Vladimirovna Shipulina; 28 August 1984 (age 41) Tyumen, RSFSR, Soviet Union
- Height: 1.80 m (5 ft 11 in)
- Weight: 67 kg (148 lb)

Sport

Professional information
- Sport: Biathlon
- Club: VSC Dukla Banská Bystrica
- World Cup debut: 7 January 2006
- Retired: 24 March 2019

Olympic Games
- Teams: 3 (2010–2018)
- Medals: 6 (3 gold)

World Championships
- Teams: 7 (2009–2013, 2017, 2019)
- Medals: 3 (1 gold)

World Cup
- Seasons: 13 (2005/06–2018/19, 2024/25-2025/26)
- Individual victories: 18
- Individual podiums: 38
- All podiums: 39
- Discipline titles: 3: 2 Sprint (2017–18, 2018–19); 1 Pursuit (2017–18);
Medal record
Event	1st	2nd	3rd
Olympic Games	3	3	0
World Championships	1	1	1
Total	4	4	1
Women's biathlon
Representing Slovakia
Olympic Games
Gold medal – first place	2010 Vancouver	7.5 km sprint
Gold medal – first place	2014 Sochi	7.5 km sprint
Gold medal – first place	2018 Pyeongchang	12.5 km mass start
Silver medal – second place	2010 Vancouver	10 km pursuit
Silver medal – second place	2018 Pyeongchang	10 km pursuit
Silver medal – second place	2018 Pyeongchang	15 km individual
World Championships
Gold medal – first place	2019 Östersund	7.5 km sprint
Silver medal – second place	2009 Pyeongchang	12. 5km mass start
Bronze medal – third place	2011 Khanty-Mansiysk	7.5 km sprint
Representing Russia
Junior World Championships
Gold medal – first place	2005 Kontiolahti	3 × 6 km relay
Silver medal – second place	2004 Haute Maurienne	3 × 6 km relay
Bronze medal – third place	2005 Kontiolahti	7.5 km sprint
Youth World Championships
Gold medal – first place	2003 Kościelisko	3 × 6 km relay
Silver medal – second place	2002 Ridnaun	3 × 6 km relay
Silver medal – second place	2003 Kościelisko	7.5 km pursuit
Silver medal – second place	2003 Kościelisko	10 km individual
- Updated on 8 March 2019

Anastasíya Vladímirovna Kuzminá (Slovak: Anastázia Kuzminová, Russian: Анастаси́я Влади́мировна Кузьмина́; née Shipulina; born 28 August 1984) is a Russian-born Slovak biathlete.

== Career ==
Kuzmina represented Slovakia from December 2008 and won the silver medal two months later in mass start at the 2009 Biathlon World Championships in Pyeongchang. She won a gold medal in the 7.5 km sprint and a silver medal in the 10 km pursuit at the 2010 Winter Olympics in Vancouver, British Columbia, Canada. Kuzmina's victory made her the second Slovak after Ondrej Nepela to win a Winter Olympic gold medal, and the first for independent Slovakia. She won another medal – bronze, at the 2011 Biathlon World Championships in Khanty-Mansiysk. At the 2014 Winter Olympics, she again won the gold medal in the 7.5 km sprint. At the 2018 Winter Olympics, she took silver medals in the pursuit and the individual before taking the gold in the mass start, hitting 19 out of 20 targets to become the first biathlete to win gold medals in three consecutive Games, and tying her as the Slovak sportsperson with the most Olympic golds alongside canoeists Pavol and Peter Hochschorner.

In the 2017–18 season she took her first discipline World Cup titles, winning the Crystal Globes for the sprint and pursuit disciplines. She also finished the season second in the overall World Cup standings, three points behind champion Kaisa Mäkäräinen.

Her brother Anton Shipulin is a Russian biathlete. Her husband, Daniel Kuzmin, is an Israeli cross-country skier and Kuzmina's personal coach. They have one son, Yelisey, and one daughter, Olivia. She, her husband and their children live in Banská Bystrica, Slovakia. She speaks Russian, Slovak and English.

After almost 5 years into her retirement from competitive biathlon, Kuzmina returned to compete in the World Cup in October 2023, deciding to compete at the 2024 IBU Open European Championships in Osrblie where she finished 59th in sprint. She continued to compete in 2025/26 World Cup season.

== Biathlon results ==
All results are sourced from the International Biathlon Union.

=== Olympic Games ===
6 medals (3 gold, 3 silver)

Kuzmina has won six medals from Olympic Games. In Vancouver she won a gold medal in the sprint and a silver medal in pursuit and in Sochi she won a gold medal in the 7.5 km sprint, becoming the first woman in biathlon to successfully defend an individual Olympic title. In Pyeongchang she won three medals, gold in the 12.5 km mass start event and silver in the 10 km pursuit and in the 15 km individual race.

Event	Individual	Sprint	Pursuit	Mass start	Relay	Mixed relay^{[a]}
(Canada) 2010 Vancouver	39th	Gold	Silver	8th	13th	—N/a
(Russia) 2014 Sochi	26th	Gold	6th	24th	–	5th
(South Korea) 2018 Pyeongchang	Silver	13th	Silver	Gold	5th	20th
(Italy) 2026 Milano-Cortina	46th	36th	49th	–	10th	19th

*The mixed relay was added as an event in 2014.

=== World Championships ===
3 medals (1 gold, 1 silver, 1 bronze)

Kuzmina has won three medals from World Championships. In Pyeongchang she won a silver medal in the 12.5 km mass start. In Khanty-Mansiysk she won a bronze medal in the 7.5 km sprint.

Event	Individual	Sprint	Pursuit	Mass start	Relay	Mixed relay	Single mixed relay
(South Korea) 2009 Pyeongchang	29th	7th	17th	Silver	13th	10th	
(Russia) 2010 Khanty-Mansiysk	Not held in an Olympic season					14th	
(Russia) 2011 Khanty-Mansiysk	9th	Bronze	6th	10th	7th	12th	
(Germany) 2012 Ruhpolding	10th	10th	19th	8th	8th	7th	
(Czech Republic) 2013 Nové Město	4th	17th	14th	15th	8th	7th	
(Austria) 2017 Hochfilzen	—	8th	13th	22nd	8th	—	
(Sweden) 2019 Östersund	58th	Gold	6th	28th	6th	—	
(Czech Republic) 2024 Nové Město	—	61st	—	—	20th	16th	—
(Switzerland) 2025 Lenzerheide	52d	33th	32nd	—	6th	12th	—

=== World Cup ===
Season	Overall			Sprint			Pursuit			Individual			Mass Start		
Season	Races	Points	Position	Races	Points	Position	Races	Points	Position	Races	Points	Position	Races	Points	Position
2005/06	5/26	0	—N/a	3/10	0	—N/a	2/8	0	—N/a	0/3	0	—N/a	0/5	0	—N/a
2006/07	3/27	20	61st	1/10	0	—N/a	1/8	0	—N/a	1/4	20	36th	0/5	0	—N/a
2007/08	did not start														
2008/09	17/26	290	30th	7/10	81	36th	5/7	50	40th	2/4	44	30th	3/5	115	13th
2009/10	17/25	443	20th	7/10	144	26th	4/6	121	15th	3/4	73	17th	3/5	105	17th
2010/11	21/26	708	9th	8/10	328	5th	5/7	195	10th	4/4	60	23rd	4/5	125	15th
2011/12	26/26	721	10th	10/10	274	8th	8/8	198	12th	3/3	85	9th	5/5	180	6th
2012/13	26/26	769	7th	10/10	294	9th	8/8	222	11th	3/3	104	5th	5/5	157	9th
2013/14	19/22	606	6th	7/9	179	12th	7/8	204	9th	2/2	84	3rd	3/3	139	2nd
2014/15	did not start														
2015/16	did not start														
2016/17	10/26	176	40th	5/9	103	29th	4/9	55	41st	0/3	0	—N/a	1/5	18	42nd
2017/18	21/22	819	2nd	8/8	323	1st	7/7	301	1st	1/2	32	22nd	5/5	168	6th
2018/19	23/25	870	3rd	9/9	371	1st	8/8	309	3rd	3/3	50	18th	5/5	145	10th
2024/25	24/25	24	74th			66th			64th						
2025/26	25/26														

=== Overall record ===
Result	Individual	Sprint	Pursuit	Mass start	Relay	Mixed relay	Total		
Result	Individual	Sprint	Pursuit	Mass start	Relay	Mixed relay	Individual events	Team events	All events
1st place	–	10	5	3	–	–	18	–	18
2nd place	2	4	5	4	–	–	15	–	15
3rd place	1	2	1	2	–	1	6	1	7
Podiums	3	16	11	9	–	1	39	1	40
Top 10	–	–	–	–	–	–	–	–	–
Points	–	–	–	–	–	–	–	–	–
Others	–	–	–	–	–	–	–	–	–
DNF	–	–	–	–	–	–	–	–	–
DSQ	–	–	–	–	–	–	–	–	–
Starts	–	–	–	–	–	–	–	–	213

* Results in IBU World Cup races, Olympics and World Championships.

=== Individual victories ===
No.	Season	Date	Location	Discipline	Level
1	2009/10	13 February 2010	Vancouver, Canada	7.5 km Sprint	Winter Olympic Games
2	2010/11	10 December 2010	Hochfilzen, Austria	7.5 km Sprint	World Cup
3	2010/11	19 March 2011	Holmenkollen, Norway	10 km Pursuit	World Cup
4	2012/13	17 January 2013	Antholz, Italy	7.5 km Sprint	World Cup
5	2013/14	9 February 2014	Sochi, Russia	7.5 km Sprint	Winter Olympic Games
6	2013/14	22 March 2014	Holmenkollen, Norway	10 km Pursuit	World Cup
7	2013/14	23 March 2014	Holmenkollen, Norway	12.5 km Mass Start	World Cup
8	2017/18	9 December 2017	Hochfilzen, Austria	10 km Pursuit	World Cup
9	2017/18	14 December 2017	Annecy, France	7.5 km Sprint	World Cup
10	2017/18	4 January 2018	Oberhof, Germany	7.5 km Sprint	World Cup
11	2017/18	6 January 2018	Oberhof, Germany	10 km Pursuit	World Cup
12	2017/18	17 February 2018	Pyeongchang, South Korea	12.5 km Mass Start	Winter Olympic Games
13	2017/18	15 March 2018	Holmenkollen, Norway	7.5 km Sprint	World Cup
14	2018/19	23 December 2018	Nové Město, Czech Republic	12.5 km Mass Start	World Cup
15	2018/19	17 January 2019	Ruhpolding, Germany	7.5 km Sprint	World Cup
16	2018/19	8 March 2019	Östersund, Sweden	7.5 km Sprint	World Championships
17	2018/19	21 March 2019	Holmenkollen, Norway	7.5 km Sprint	World Cup
18	2018/19	23 March 2019	Holmenkollen, Norway	10 km Pursuit	World Cup

*Results are from IBU races which include the Biathlon World Cup, Biathlon World Championships and the Winter Olympic Games.

Updated on 25 March 2018

Awards and achievements
Preceded by Peter Hochschorner/Pavol Hochschorner; Peter Sagan; Peter Sagan	Sportsperson of Slovakia; 2010; 2014; 2018	Succeeded by Peter Hochschorner/Pavol Hochschorner; Peter Sagan; Petra Vlhova
