= Synnøve Solemdal =

Norwegian biathlete (born 1989)

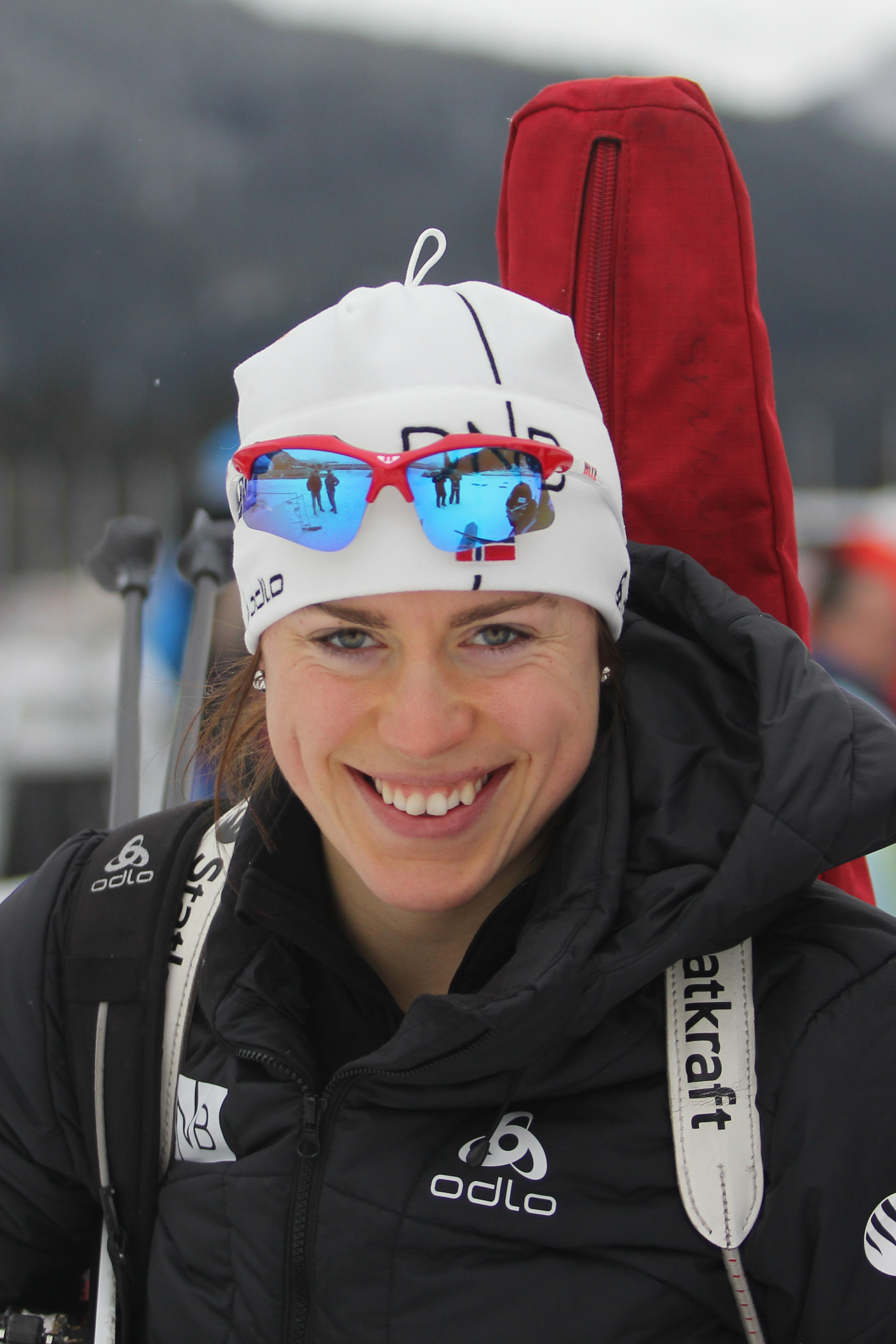

Personal information
- Nationality: Norwegian
- Born: 15 May 1989 (age 37) Tingvoll Municipality, Norway
- Height: 1.75 m (5 ft 9 in)
- Weight: 70 kg (154 lb)

Sport

Professional information
- Sport: Biathlon
- World Cup debut: 2009

Olympic Games
- Teams: 2 (2014, 2018)
- Medals: 0

World Championships
- Teams: 7 (2011–2016, 2019–2020)
- Medals: 7 (5 gold)
Medal record
World Championships
Gold medal – first place	2012 Ruhpolding	Mixed relay
Gold medal – first place	2013 Nové Město	4 × 6 km relay
Gold medal – first place	2013 Nové Město	Mixed relay
Gold medal – first place	2016 Oslo	4 × 6 km relay
Gold medal – first place	2019 Östersund	4 x 6 km relay
Gold medal – first place	2020 Antholz	4 x 6 km relay
Bronze medal – third place	2012 Ruhpolding	4 × 6 km relay
Junior World Championships
Silver medal – second place	2010 Torsby	3 × 6 km relay
Bronze medal – third place	2010 Torsby	7.5 km sprint
Bronze medal – third place	2010 Torsby	10 km pursuit
Youth World Championships
Silver medal – second place	2008 Ruhpolding	3 × 6 km relay

Synnøve Solemdal (born 15 May 1989) is a Norwegian former biathlete. She competed for Norway at the 2014 Winter Olympics and 2018 Winter Olympics.

== Career ==
Solemdal won two bronze medals at the 2010 Junior World Championships. As of the 2010/2011 season she is part of the Norwegian team. On 11 December 2010, she along with her teammates placed third in 4 × 6 km relay in Hochfilzen.

She took her first world cup victory in the 2012–13 season, moving up from 4th after the Sprint race to take the Pursuit in Hochfilzen. She repeated the feat the following year to claim her second victory, also in the pursuit in Hochfilzen during the 2013–14 season.

At the 2012 World Championships in Ruhpolding she won a gold medal in mix relay and a bronze medal in relay. She won a gold medal in the mixed relay at the 2013 Biathlon World Championships in the Czech Republic.

== Biathlon results ==
All results are sourced from the International Biathlon Union.

=== Olympic Games ===
0 medals

Event	Individual	Sprint	Pursuit	Mass start	Relay	Mixed relay
(Russia) 2014 Sochi	—	35th	36th	—	—	—
(South Korea) 2018 Pyeongchang	40th	50th	41st	—	4th	—

*The mixed relay was added as an event in 2014.

=== World Championships ===
6 medals (5 gold, 1 bronze)

Event	Individual	Sprint	Pursuit	Mass start	Relay	Mixed relay	Single mixed relay
(Russia) 2011 Khanty-Mansiysk	62nd	42nd	LAP	—	5th	—	—N/a
(Germany) 2012 Ruhpolding	39th	32nd	24th	18th	Bronze	Gold	—N/a
(Czech Republic) 2013 Nové Město	53rd	19th	19th	16th	Gold	Gold	—N/a
(Finland) 2015 Kontiolahti	46th	—	—	—	4th	—	—N/a
(Norway) 2016 Oslo Holmenkollen	—	34th	24th	—	Gold	—	—N/a
(Sweden) 2019 Östersund	29th	62nd	—	—	Gold	—	—

*During Olympic seasons competitions are only held for those events not included in the Olympic program.
**The single mixed relay was added as an event in 2019.
