= Ski jumping at the 2014 Winter Olympics – Men's large hill individual =

Men's large hill individual at the XXII Olympic Winter Games
- Venue: RusSki Gorki Jumping Center
- Dates: 14–15 February 2014
- Competitors: 61 from 20 nations
- Winning Score: 278.7

Medalists
1st place, gold medalist(s)		Kamil Stoch	Poland
2nd place, silver medalist(s)		Noriaki Kasai	Japan
3rd place, bronze medalist(s)		Peter Prevc	Slovenia

The men's large hill individual ski jumping competition for the 2014 Winter Olympics in Sochi, Russia, was held on 14–15 February 2014 at RusSki Gorki Jumping Center in the Esto-Sadok village on the northern slope of Aibga Ridge in Krasnaya Polyana.

The gold medal won in this event featured Chelyabinsk meteor fragment to commemorate the first anniversary of this meteor strike.

== Results ==
=== Qualifying ===
50 ski jumpers qualify for the finals. The top 10 ski jumpers from the World Cup season pre-qualify for the finals. The top 40 ski jumpers from qualifying fill the final 40 spots in the finals.

Rank	Bib	Name	Country	Distance (m)	Distance points	Judges points	Total	Notes
1	40	Michael Hayböck	Austria	131.0	70.8	53.5	124.8	Q
2	49	Daiki Ito	Japan	130.5	69.9	55.5	122.0	Q
3	32	Reruhi Shimizu	Japan	130.5	69.9	54.5	120.4	Q
4	50	Marinus Kraus	Germany	130.0	69.0	54.0	120.2	Q
5	38	Anssi Koivuranta	Finland	128.5	66.3	54.0	118.9	Q
6	51	Thomas Morgenstern	Austria	128.0	65.4	53.0	116.0	Q
6	48	Taku Takeuchi	Japan	127.0	63.6	54.0	116.0	Q
8	47	Jernej Damjan	Slovenia	126.0	61.8	52.5	115.9	Q
9	44	Maciej Kot	Poland	126.0	61.8	52.5	115.4	Q
10	35	Jakub Janda	Czech Republic	124.5	59.1	53.5	113.6	Q
11	37	Janne Ahonen	Finland	126.5	62.7	52.5	110.0	Q
12	24	Olli Muotka	Finland	128.5	66.3	52.0	109.9	Q
13	46	Jan Ziobro	Poland	123.0	56.4	51.0	109.0	Q
14	34	Gregor Deschwanden	Switzerland	120.0	51.0	49.5	108.2	Q
15	45	Jurij Tepeš	Slovenia	123.5	57.3	52.0	107.9	Q
15	39	Anders Fannemel	Norway	121.5	53.7	52.0	107.9	Q
17	41	Jan Matura	Czech Republic	120.5	51.9	52.0	106.4	Q
17	36	Rune Velta	Norway	123.0	56.4	52.5	106.4	Q
19	31	Mackenzie Boyd-Clowes	Canada	124.0	58.2	52.0	105.5	Q
20	7	Roman Koudelka	Czech Republic	120.0	51.0	51.0	104.6	Q
21	42	Richard Freitag	Germany	118.5	48.3	51.0	104.4	Q
22	10	Sebastian Colloredo	Italy	124.0	58.2	52.5	104.1	Q
23	28	Denis Kornilov	Russia	121.5	53.7	52.0	104.0	Q
24	21	Kaarel Nurmsalu	Estonia	125.0	60.0	49.0	103.6	Q
25	30	Anders Jacobsen	Norway	119.5	50.1	51.0	103.0	Q
26	33	Dimitry Vassiliev	Russia	119.0	49.2	51.0	102.8	Q
27	43	Piotr Żyła	Poland	118.0	47.4	51.0	101.3	Q
28	26	Ronan Lamy Chappuis	France	121.5	53.7	50.0	99.8	Q
29	17	Choi Seou	South Korea	117.0	45.6	50.0	97.7	Q
30	1	Nicholas Alexander	United States	120.0	51.0	46.5	96.6	Q
31	20	Nicholas Fairall	United States	120.0	51.0	47.5	95.7	Q
32	16	Ilmir Hazetdinov	Russia	114.5	41.1	50.0	93.8	Q
33	29	Jarkko Määttä	Finland	118.0	47.4	49.5	93.0	Q
34	27	Antonín Hájek	Czech Republic	117.0	45.6	51.0	91.8	Q
34	22	Alexey Romashov	Russia	119.0	49.2	50.5	91.8	Q
36	13	Anders Johnson	United States	112.0	36.6	49.5	91.1	Q
37	9	Choi Heung-Chul	South Korea	116.0	43.8	49.0	88.6	Q
38	5	Matthew Rowley	Canada	110.5	33.9	48.0	88.4	Q
39	4	Vladimir Zografski	Bulgaria	112.0	36.6	49.5	87.9	Q
40	11	Trevor Morrice	Canada	113.0	38.4	48.5	84.5	Q
41	25	Davide Bresadola	Italy	115.0	42.0	49.5	83.9	
42	14	Dusty Korek	Canada	109.0	31.2	48.5	82.7	
43	19	Peter Frenette	United States	111.0	34.8	49.5	80.9	
44	15	Kim Hyun-Ki	South Korea	111.0	34.8	49.0	80.3	
45	6	Kang Chil-Ku	South Korea	104.5	23.1	47.0	78.8	
46	18	Alexey Pchelintsev	Kazakhstan	109.0	31.2	47.5	75.8	
47	8	Nico Polychronidis	Greece	107.5	28.5	47.0	74.7	
48	12	Marat Zhaparov	Kazakhstan	104.5	23.1	45.0	73.2	
49	2	Siim-Tanel Sammelselg	Estonia	107.5	28.5	44.0	69.0	
50	23	Roberto Dellasega	Italy	112.0	36.6	41.0	68.9	
51	3	Sorin Iulian Pitea	Romania	101.5	17.7	45.5	59.6	
*	52	Robert Kranjec	Slovenia	127.0	63.6	N/A	N/A	Q
*	53	Thomas Diethart	Austria	131.0	70.8	N/A	N/A	Q
*	54	Andreas Wellinger	Germany	128.0	65.4	N/A	N/A	Q
*	55	Anders Bardal	Norway	130.5	69.9	N/A	N/A	Q
*	56	Simon Ammann	Switzerland	123.5	57.3	N/A	N/A	Q
*	57	Severin Freund	Germany	DNS	N/A	N/A	N/A	Q
*	58	Gregor Schlierenzauer	Austria	124.5	59.1	N/A	N/A	Q
*	59	Noriaki Kasai	Japan	DNS	N/A	N/A	N/A	Q
*	60	Peter Prevc	Slovenia	128.5	66.3	N/A	N/A	Q
*	61	Kamil Stoch	Poland	DNS	N/A	N/A	N/A	Q

1: These skiers are pre-qualified; they perform jumps in the qualification round, but are not ranked with the non-pre-qualified jumpers.

=== Final ===
The final was started at 21:30. The final consisted of two jumps, with the top thirty after the first jump qualifying for the second jump. The combined total of the two jumps was used to determine the final ranking.

				Round 1			Final round			Total
Rank	Bib	Name	Country	Distance (m)	Points	Rank	Distance (m)	Points	Rank	Points
1st place, gold medalist(s)	50	Kamil Stoch	Poland	139.0	143.4	1	132.5	135.3	4	278.7
2nd place, silver medalist(s)	48	Noriaki Kasai	Japan	139.0	140.6	2	133.5	136.8	3	277.4
3rd place, bronze medalist(s)	49	Peter Prevc	Slovenia	135.0	134.5	4	131.0	140.3	1	274.8
4	46	Severin Freund	Germany	138.0	140.2	3	129.5	132.0	6	272.2
5	28	Anders Fannemel	Norway	132.0	129.5	7	132.0	134.8	5	264.3
6	39	Marinus Kraus	Germany	131.0	117.7	24	140.0	139.7	2	257.4
7	47	Gregor Schlierenzauer	Austria	132.5	124.6	14	130.5	130.6	7	255.2
8	29	Michael Hayböck	Austria	134.0	127.3	9	125.5	127.4	9	254.7
9	38	Daiki Ito	Japan	137.5	128.1	8	124.0	124.4	14	252.5
10	21	Reruhi Shimizu	Japan	130.0	122.2	15	134.5	130.0	8	252.2
11	27	Anssi Koivuranta	Finland	131.5	130.9	5	121.5	119.7	21	250.6
12	33	Maciej Kot	Poland	126.0	125.4	12	123.5	125.0	12	250.4
13	37	Taku Takeuchi	Japan	132.5	126.7	10	122.5	122.6	18	249.3
14	23	Gregor Deschwanden	Switzerland	134.5	130.3	6	123.0	117.1	25	247.4
15	35	Jan Ziobro	Poland	128.5	122.1	16	129.5	124.5	13	246.6
16	44	Anders Bardal	Norway	127.5	120.7	18	127.5	125.8	11	246.5
17	36	Jernej Damjan	Slovenia	130.5	124.7	13	124.5	121.2	20	245.9
18	30	Jan Matura	Czech Republic	131.0	125.6	11	121.0	119.2	22	244.8
19	4	Roman Koudelka	Czech Republic	128.0	119.1	21	125.5	124.4	14	243.5
20	34	Jurij Tepeš	Slovenia	124.5	118.2	23	131.0	124.0	16	242.2
21	31	Richard Freitag	Germany	122.5	118.6	22	126.5	123.5	17	242.1
22	26	Janne Ahonen	Finland	126.0	119.8	20	123.0	121.5	19	241.3
23	45	Simon Ammann	Switzerland	125.5	113.2	29	131.0	126.0	10	239.2
24	25	Rune Velta	Norway	126.5	121.9	17	123.5	116.8	26	238.7
25	20	Mackenzie Boyd-Clowes	Canada	132.0	120.1	19	123.5	117.8	24	237.9
26	22	Dimitry Vassiliev	Russia	130.5	116.8	25	144.5	118.2	23	235.0
27	24	Jakub Janda	Czech Republic	127.0	115.3	27	126.0	116.3	27	231.6
28	16	Antonín Hájek	Czech Republic	128.0	113.6	28	124.5	112.1	28	225.7
29	9	Ilmir Hazetdinov	Russia	124.5	111.3	30	125.0	109.5	29	220.8
30	6	Sebastian Colloredo	Italy	130.5	116.7	26	124.5	102.9	30	219.6
31	17	Denis Kornilov	Russia	125.0	109.7	31				
32	42	Thomas Diethart	Austria	126.5	109.1	32				
33	14	Olli Muotka	Finland	124.5	108.9	33				
34	32	Piotr Żyła	Poland	118.0	108.7	34				
35	11	Nicholas Fairall	United States	119.5	108.3	35				
36	15	Ronan Lamy Chappuis	France	125.0	108.2	36				
37	41	Robert Kranjec	Slovenia	125.5	108.1	37				
38	19	Anders Jacobsen	Norway	122.5	107.6	38				
39	10	Choi Seou	South Korea	122.0	106.4	39				
40	40	Thomas Morgenstern	Austria	122.0	106.3	40				
41	12	Kaarel Nurmsalu	Estonia	124.5	105.9	41				
42	7	Trevor Morrice	Canada	121.5	103.4	42				
43	18	Jarkko Määttä	Finland	124.0	101.3	43				
44	5	Choi Heung-Chul	South Korea	121.5	99.0	44				
45	43	Andreas Wellinger	Germany	117.0	96.6	45				
46	13	Alexey Romashov	Russia	120.0	93.6	46				
47	2	Vladimir Zografski	Bulgaria	110.0	89.3	47				
48	1	Nicholas Alexander	United States	111.5	87.0	48				
	8	Anders Johnson	United States							DSQ
	3	Matthew Rowley	Canada							DSQ
