= Ski jumping at the 2014 Winter Olympics – Men's large hill team =

Men's large hill team at the XXII Olympic Winter Games
- Venue: RusSki Gorki Jumping Center
- Dates: 17 February 2014
- Competitors: 48 from 12 nations
- Winning score: 1,041.1

Medalists
1st place, gold medalist(s)		Andreas Wank; Marinus Kraus; Andreas Wellinger; Severin Freund	Germany
2nd place, silver medalist(s)		Michael Hayböck; Thomas Morgenstern; Thomas Diethart; Gregor Schlierenzauer	Austria
3rd place, bronze medalist(s)		Reruhi Shimizu; Taku Takeuchi; Daiki Ito; Noriaki Kasai	Japan

The men's large hill team ski jumping competition for the 2014 Winter Olympics in Sochi, Russia, was held on 17 February 2014 at RusSki Gorki Jumping Center in the Esto-Sadok village on the northern slope of Aibga Ridge in Krasnaya Polyana.

== Results ==
			Round 1			Final round			Total
Rank	Bib	Country	Distance (m)	Points	Rank	Distance (m)	Points	Rank	Points
1st place, gold medalist(s)	11; 11–1; 11–2; 11–3; 11–4	Germany; Andreas Wank; Marinus Kraus; Andreas Wellinger; Severin Freund	132.0; 136.5; 133.0; 131.5	519.0; 123.2; 136.1; 125.3; 134.4	1	128.0; 134.5; 134.5; 131.0	522.1; 125.5; 132.0; 133.9; 130.7	2	1,041.1; 248.7; 268.1; 259.2; 265.1
2nd place, silver medalist(s)	12; 12–1; 12–2; 12–3; 12–4	Austria; Michael Hayböck; Thomas Morgenstern; Thomas Diethart; Gregor Schlierenzauer	134.0; 129.0; 136.0; 128.5	516.5; 127.7; 124.3; 136.0; 128.5	2	130.0; 133.5; 132.5; 132.0	521.9; 130.4; 129.9; 130.2; 131.4	3	1,038.4; 258.1; 254.2; 266.2; 259.9
3rd place, bronze medalist(s)	8; 8–1; 8–2; 8–3; 8–4	Japan; Reruhi Shimizu; Taku Takeuchi; Daiki Ito; Noriaki Kasai	132.5; 127.0; 130.5; 134.0	507.5; 127.8; 117.9; 130.3; 131.5	3	131.5; 130.0; 132.0; 134.0	517.4; 132.6; 120.5; 127.0; 137.3	4	1,024.9; 260.4; 238.4; 257.3; 268.8
4	9; 9–1; 9–2; 9–3; 9–4	Poland; Maciej Kot; Piotr Żyła; Jan Ziobro; Kamil Stoch	131.5; 121.0; 130.5; 130.5	489.2; 125.0; 107.2; 127.8; 129.2	4	129.0; 132.0; 133.0; 135.0	522.6; 126.8; 126.3; 129.7; 139.8	1	1,011.8; 251.8; 233.5; 257.5; 269.0
5	10; 10–1; 10–2; 10–3; 10–4	Slovenia; Jurij Tepeš; Robert Kranjec; Jernej Damjan; Peter Prevc	133.0; 120.5; 128.0; 133.5	488.2; 127.1; 103.9; 119.5; 137.7	5	126.5; 131.0; 130.5; 136.0	507.4; 121.2; 121.9; 125.3; 139.0	5	995.6; 248.3; 225.8; 244.8; 276.7
6	7; 7–1; 7–2; 7–3; 7–4	Norway; Anders Bardal; Anders Fannemel; Anders Jacobsen; Rune Velta	137.5; 129.5; 119.0; 125.0	486.0; 137.7; 123.4; 111.5; 113.4	6	133.0; 133.0; 130.5; 125.5	504.7; 134.8; 125.4; 125.8; 118.7	6	990.7; 272.5; 248.8; 237.3; 232.1
7	6; 6–1; 6–2; 6–3; 6–4	Czech Republic; Jakub Janda; Antonín Hájek; Roman Koudelka; Jan Matura	131.0; 128.0; 122.5; 122.5	476.0; 123.3; 121.4; 122.1; 109.2	7	127.5; 131.0; 130.5; 127.5	491.8; 121.6; 126.1; 126.1; 118.0	7	967.8; 244.9; 247.5; 248.2; 227.2
8	5; 5–1; 5–2; 5–3; 5–4	Finland; Anssi Koivuranta; Jarkko Määttä; Olli Muotka; Janne Ahonen	129.5; 128.5; 123.0; 124.5	461.5; 120.8; 117.1; 113.2; 110.4	8	130.0; 124.0; 126.0; 132.0	481.3; 126.5; 110.5; 114.1; 130.2	8	942.8; 247.3; 227.6; 227.3; 240.6
9	4; 4–1; 4–2; 4–3; 4–4	Russia; Ilmir Hazetdinov; Alexey Romashov; Dimitry Vassiliev; Denis Kornilov	121.0; 124.5; 123.5; 118.5	422.3; 102.1; 108.5; 113.2; 98.5	9	did not advance			422.3; 102.1; 108.5; 113.2; 98.5
10	2; 2–1; 2–2; 2–3; 2–4	United States; Peter Frenette; Nick Fairall; Anders Johnson; Nicholas Alexander	113.0; 120.5; 119.0; 126.5	402.5; 84.2; 102.0; 101.9; 114.4	10	did not advance			402.5; 84.2; 102.0; 101.9; 114.4
11	1; 1–1; 1–2; 1–3; 1–4	South Korea; Kang Chil-ku; Kim Hyun-ki; Choi Heung-chul; Choi Seo-woo	116.5; 126.0; 117.0; 117.0	402.0; 91.2; 113.5; 99.5; 97.8	11	did not advance			402.0; 91.2; 113.5; 99.5; 97.8
12	3; 3–1; 3–2; 3–3; 3–4	Canada; Trevor Morrice; Dusty Korek; Matthew Rowley; Mackenzie Boyd-Clowes	117.5; 121.5; 125.5; 123.5	399.2; 94.3; 102.6; 94.7; 107.6	12	did not advance			399.2; 94.3; 102.6; 94.7; 107.6
