= Canada at the 2014 Winter Olympics =

- IOC code: CAN
- NOC: Canadian Olympic Committee
- Website: www.olympic.ca (in English and French)

in Sochi
- Competitors: 222 in 14 sports
- Flag bearers: Hayley Wickenheiser (opening ceremony); Kaillie Humphries and Heather Moyse (closing ceremony)
- Medals Ranked 3rd: Gold 10 Silver 10 Bronze 5 Total 25

Winter Olympics appearances (overview)
- 1924; 1928; 1932; 1936; 1948; 1952; 1956; 1960; 1964; 1968; 1972; 1976; 1980; 1984; 1988; 1992; 1994; 1998; 2002; 2006; 2010; 2014; 2018; 2022; 2026

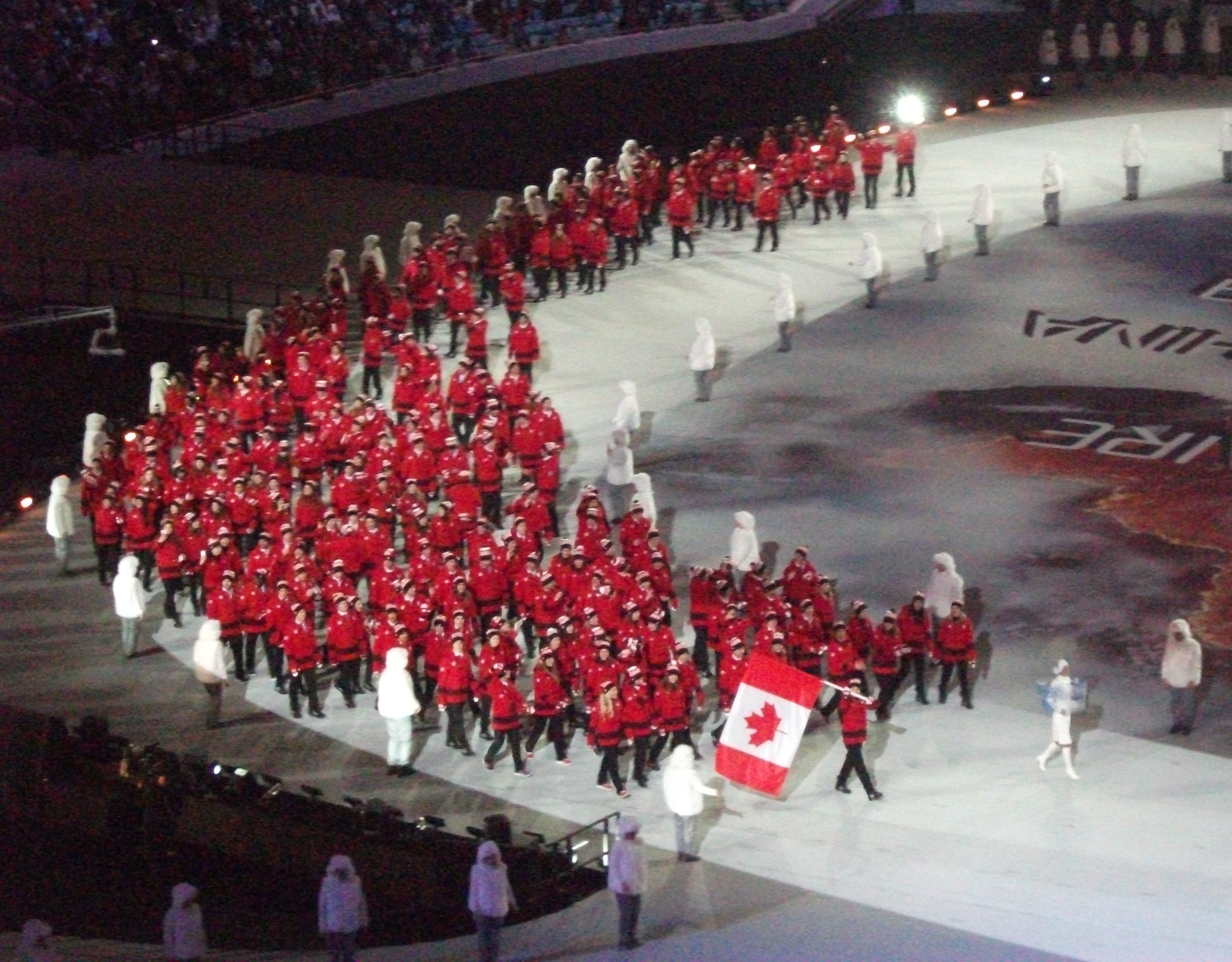
Canadian Team during the Opening Ceremony of the 2014 Olympic Winter Games

Canada competed at the 2014 Winter Olympics in Sochi, Russia, from February 7 to 23, 2014. Canadians competed in every discipline except Nordic combined.

The 2014 Games marked the first time a Canadian Olympic team competed in Russia, as Canada and 64 western countries did not take part at the 1980 Summer Olympics held in Moscow due to the Soviet–Afghan War.

The youngest athlete in Canada's delegation was figure skater Gabrielle Daleman, who turned 16 in January, while curler Jennifer Jones was the oldest athlete at 39.

Canada originally finished these Olympics with 10 gold medals and 25 overall (ranking 2nd and 3rd respectively). This is the second most successful Canadian performance ever, exceeded only by the achievements at the home Olympics in Vancouver in 2010. With the belated luge medal awarded in 2017 after a Russian doping disqualification, Canada briefly tied its Vancouver performance in total medal count. However, the IOC decision was overturned on appeal, bumping the Canadian team back to fourth and the total medal count back to 2nd and 3rd.

== History ==
On Day 1 of the Games, three athletes won the nation's first medals. Canada's first medalist was Mark McMorris, who won a bronze in the slopestyle snowboarding event. Justine Dufour-Lapointe won the first gold medal in freestyle skiing (women's moguls) and her sister, Chloé Dufour-Lapointe, finished in second place in the same event, earning the country's first silver medal.

At 19 years 321 days, Justine Dufour-Lapointe became the youngest freestyle skiing Olympic gold medalist. Justine and Chloé, became the third pair of sisters to finish 1–2 in an event at the Winter Games. Their elder sister, Maxime, finished 12th in the same event. It was the fifth time three siblings have competed at the same event at the Winter Games.

On February 10, Alexandre Bilodeau became the first freestyle skiing gold medalist to defend his Olympic title, and first repeat gold medalist, winning the men's moguls. He became the first Canadian to defend their Olympic gold since Catriona Le May Doan repeated her gold at the 2002 Salt Lake City Olympics. Le May Doan had been the first Canadian to repeat gold, Bilodeau becoming the second to do so, and the first man.

== Medalists ==
Medals by sport
Sport	1st place, gold medalist(s)	2nd place, silver medalist(s)	3rd place, bronze medalist(s)	Total
Freestyle skiing	4	4	1	9
Curling	2	0	0	2
Ice hockey	2	0	0	2
Short track speed skating	1	1	1	3
Bobsleigh	1	0	0	1
Figure skating	0	3	0	3
Snowboarding	0	1	1	2
Speed skating	0	1	1	2
Alpine skiing	0	0	1	1
Total	10	10	5	25

Medals by date
Day	Date	1st place, gold medalist(s)	2nd place, silver medalist(s)	3rd place, bronze medalist(s)	Total
Day 1	February 8	1	1	1	3
Day 2	February 9	0	1	0	1
Day 3	February 10	2	1	0	3
Day 4	February 11	1	0	1	2
Day 5	February 12	0	1	0	1
Day 6	February 13	0	0	0	0
Day 7	February 14	0	1	0	1
Day 8	February 15	0	0	1	1
Day 9	February 16	0	1	1	2
Day 10	February 17	0	1	0	1
Day 11	February 18	0	2	0	2
Day 12	February 19	1	0	0	1
Day 13	February 20	2	0	0	2
Day 14	February 21	2	1	1	4
Day 15	February 22	0	0	0	0
Day 16	February 23	1	0	0	1
Total		10	10	5	25

Medal	Name	Sport	Event	Date
Gold	Justine Dufour-Lapointe	Freestyle skiing	Women's moguls	February 8
Gold	Alexandre Bilodeau	Freestyle skiing	Men's moguls	February 10
Gold	Charles Hamelin	Short track	Men's 1500 m	February 10
Gold	Dara Howell	Freestyle skiing	Women's slopestyle	February 11
Gold	Kaillie Humphries; Heather Moyse	Bobsleigh	Two woman	February 19
Gold	Jennifer Jones; Kaitlyn Lawes; Jill Officer; Dawn McEwen; Kirsten Wall	Curling	Women's tournament	February 20
Gold	Canada women's national ice hockey team: Meghan Agosta-Marciano; Gillian Apps; Mélodie Daoust; Laura Fortino; Jayna Hefford; Haley Irwin; Brianne Jenner; Rebecca Johnston; Charline Labonté; Geneviève Lacasse; Jocelyne Larocque; Meaghan Mikkelson; Caroline Ouellette; Marie-Philip Poulin; Lauriane Rougeau; Natalie Spooner; Shannon Szabados; Jenn Wakefield; Catherine Ward; Tara Watchorn; Hayley Wickenheiser	Ice hockey	Women's tournament	February 20
Gold	Marielle Thompson	Freestyle skiing	Women's ski cross	February 21
Gold	Brad Jacobs; Ryan Fry; E. J. Harnden; Ryan Harnden; Caleb Flaxey	Curling	Men's tournament	February 21
Gold	Canada men's national ice hockey team: Jamie Benn; Patrice Bergeron; Jay Bouwmeester; Jeff Carter; Sidney Crosby; Drew Doughty; Matt Duchene; Ryan Getzlaf; Dan Hamhuis; Duncan Keith; Chris Kunitz; Roberto Luongo; Patrick Marleau; Rick Nash; Corey Perry; Alex Pietrangelo; Carey Price; Patrick Sharp; Mike Smith; Martin St. Louis; P. K. Subban; John Tavares; Jonathan Toews; Marc-Édouard Vlasic; Shea Weber	Ice hockey	Men's tournament	February 23
Silver	Chloé Dufour-Lapointe	Freestyle skiing	Women's moguls	February 8
Silver	Patrick Chan; Meagan Duhamel; Scott Moir; Kirsten Moore-Towers; Dylan Moscovitch; Kaetlyn Osmond; Eric Radford; Kevin Reynolds; Tessa Virtue	Figure skating	Team trophy	February 9
Silver	Mikaël Kingsbury	Freestyle skiing	Men's moguls	February 10
Silver	Denny Morrison	Speed skating	Men's 1000 metres	February 12
Silver	Patrick Chan	Figure skating	Men's singles	February 14
Silver	Dominique Maltais	Snowboarding	Women's snowboard cross	February 16
Silver	Tessa Virtue; Scott Moir	Figure skating	Ice dancing	February 17
Silver	Mike Riddle	Freestyle skiing	Men's halfpipe	February 18
Silver	Marie-Ève Drolet; Jessica Hewitt; Valérie Maltais; Marianne St-Gelais	Short track	Women's 3000 m relay	February 18
Silver	Kelsey Serwa	Freestyle skiing	Women's ski cross	February 21
Bronze	Mark McMorris	Snowboarding	Men's slopestyle	February 8
Bronze	Kim Lamarre	Freestyle skiing	Women's slopestyle	February 11
Bronze	Denny Morrison	Speed skating	Men's 1500 metres	February 15
Bronze	Jan Hudec	Alpine skiing	Men's super-G	February 16
Bronze	Charle Cournoyer	Short track	Men's 500 metres	February 21

== Competitors ==
Sport	Men	Women	Total
Alpine skiing	9	6	15
Biathlon	4	4	8
Bobsleigh	12	4	16
Cross-country skiing	6	7	13
Curling	5	5	10
Figure skating	9	8	17
Freestyle skiing	13	13	26
Ice hockey	25	21	46
Luge	5	3	8
Short track speed skating	5	5	10
Skeleton	2	2	4
Ski jumping	4	2	6
Snowboarding	14	10	24
Speed skating	8	9	17
Total	121	100	221

== Alpine skiing ==
According to the final quota allocation released on January 26, 2014, Canada has fifteen athletes in qualification position.

The first three men who have qualified were formally announced on January 8, 2014. and the first three women were formally announced on January 16, 2014. The final nine members of the team were named on January 27, 2013.

Men

Athlete	Event	Run 1		Run 2		Total	
Athlete	Event	Time	Rank	Time	Rank	Time	Rank
Erik Guay	Downhill	—N/a				2:07.04	10
Jan Hudec	Downhill	—N/a				2:08.49	21
Manuel Osborne-Paradis	Downhill	—N/a				2:09.00	25
Benjamin Thomsen	Downhill	—N/a				2:08.00	19
Erik Guay	Super-G	—N/a				DNF	
Jan Hudec	Super-G	—N/a				1:18.67	3rd place, bronze medalist(s)
Manuel Osborne-Paradis	Super-G	—N/a				1:20.19	24
Morgan Pridy	Super-G	—N/a				1:19.19	10
Morgan Pridy	Combined	1:56.21	25	53.82	19	2:50.03	20
Phil Brown	Giant slalom	1:24.82	32	1:25.09	24	2:49.91	29
Trevor Philp	Giant slalom	1:24.38	31	1:25.17	25	2:49.55	25
Morgan Pridy	Giant slalom	1:25.95	39	1:26.01	30	2:51.96	33
Phil Brown	Slalom	49.97	34	59.68	20	1:49.65	21
Mike Janyk	Slalom	48.82	22	55.54	12	1:44.36	16
Trevor Philp	Slalom	49.55	29	DNF			
Brad Spence	Slalom	49.55	29	DSQ			

Women

Athlete	Event	Run 1		Run 2		Total	
Athlete	Event	Time	Rank	Time	Rank	Time	Rank
Larisa Yurkiw	Downhill	—N/a				1:43.46	20
Marie-Michèle Gagnon	Super-G	—N/a				DNF	
Marie-Pier Préfontaine	Super-G	—N/a				1:28.67	20
Larisa Yurkiw	Super-G	—N/a				DNF	
Marie-Michèle Gagnon	Combined	1:45.39	21	DNF			
Marie-Michèle Gagnon	Giant slalom	DNF					
Erin Mielzynski	Giant slalom	1:21.25	20	1:19.44	18	2:40.69	21
Marie-Pier Préfontaine	Giant slalom	DNF					
Marie-Michèle Gagnon	Slalom	54.32	10	53.05	15	1:47.37	9
Erin Mielzynski	Slalom	DNF					
Brittany Phelan	Slalom	56.41	17	52.70	12	1:49.11	15
Elli Terwiel	Slalom	DNF					

== Biathlon ==
Canada has officially qualified 5 women and 5 men after finishing 13th in the 2012 and 2013 Biathlon World Championships for both sexes. However, only 8 athletes were to be selected. The team was unveiled on January 2, 2014.

Men

Athlete	Event	Time	Misses	Rank
Brendan Green	Sprint	25:31.7	1 (1+0)	23
Jean-Philippe Leguellec	Sprint	24:43.2	0 (0+0)	5
Scott Perras	Sprint	27:32.1	3 (2+1)	74
Nathan Smith	Sprint	25:09.7	0 (0+0)	13
Brendan Green	Pursuit	32:21.2	4 (2+1+1+0)	35
Jean-Philippe Leguellec	Pursuit	35:45.3	3 (0+0+2+1)	26
Nathan Smith	Pursuit	34:37.1	1 (0+0+1+0)	11
Brendan Green	Individual	52:05.3	2 (0+1+1+0)	21
Jean-Philippe Leguellec	Individual	53:25.5	2 (0+1+0+1)	35
Scott Perras	Individual	56:04.3	4 (0+3+1+0)	59
Nathan Smith	Individual	52:41.3	3 (0+2+0+1)	25
Brendan Green	Mass start	43:38.3	2 (1+1+0+0)	8
Jean-Philippe Leguellec	Mass start	43:41.6	1 (0+0+0+1)	10
Nathan Smith	Mass start	DNF	5 (2+3)	DNF
Brendan Green; Jean-Philippe Leguellec; Scott Perras; Nathan Smith	Team relay	1:13:46.2	11 (1+10)	7

Women

Athlete	Event	Time	Misses	Rank
Rosanna Crawford	Sprint	22:10.8	1 (0+1)	25
Megan Heinicke	Sprint	23:34.5	3 (1+2)	59
Megan Imrie	Sprint	22:19.5	1 (0+1)	31
Zina Kocher	Sprint	22:25.5	2 (1+1)	32
Rosanna Crawford	Pursuit	34:15.6	7 (2+3+2+0)	45
Megan Heinicke	Pursuit	DNF		
Megan Imrie	Pursuit	35:22.7	2 (1+0+1+0)	28
Zina Kocher	Pursuit	32:15.1	4 (0+2+0+2)	25
Rosanna Crawford	Individual	53:29.8	5 (2+1+1+1)	67
Megan Heinicke	Individual	50:26.8	4 (3+0+0+1)	51
Megan Imrie	Individual	48:32.7	2 (1+0+1+0)	30
Zina Kocher	Individual	53:00.7	8 (1+4+0+3)	63
Megan Imrie	Mass start	38:59.0	5 (1+0+1+3)	27
Rosanna Crawford; Megan Heinicke; Megan Imrie; Zina Kocher	Team relay	1:12:21.5	14 (2+12)	8

Mixed

Athlete	Event	Time	Misses	Rank
Megan Imrie; Rosanna Crawford; Brendan Green; Scott Perras	Team relay	1:13:27.7	8 (0+8)	11

== Bobsleigh ==
The qualification is based on the world rankings as of January 20, 2014.

On December 16, 2013, the following athletes were named to the Canadian Olympic team.

Men

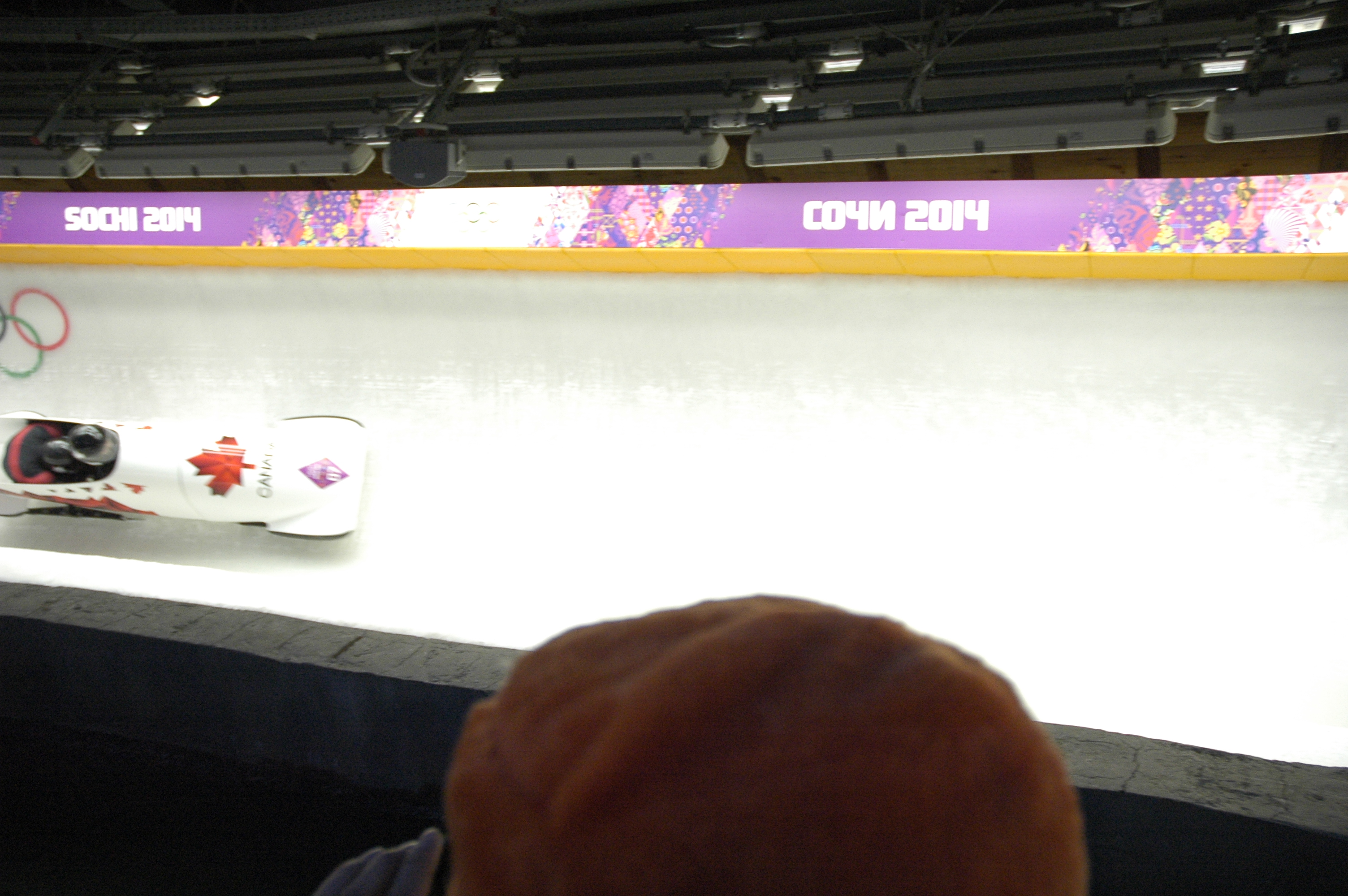
CAN-1 two-man sled

Athlete	Event	Run 1		Run 2		Run 3		Run 4		Total	
Athlete	Event	Time	Rank	Time	Rank	Time	Rank	Time	Rank	Time	Rank
Bryan Barnett; Justin Kripps*	Two-man	56.56	6	56.70	6	56.42	4	56.94	14	3:46.62	6
Lascelles Brown; Lyndon Rush*	Two-man	56.61	7	56.87	9	56.64	9	56.76	9	3:46.88	9
Jesse Lumsden; Christopher Spring*	Two-man	56.66	10	56.77	7	56.62	8	56.74	7	3:46.79	7
Bryan Barnett; James McNaughton; Tim Randall; Christopher Spring*	Four-man	55.50	10	55.70	16	55.88	=11	55.76	11	3:42.84	11
David Bissett; Lascelles Brown; Lyndon Rush*; Neville Wright	Four-man	55.35	9	55.43	=5	55.60	=6	55.38	3	3:41.76	7
Ben Coakwell**; Justin Kripps*; Jesse Lumsden; Cody Sorensen**; Luke Demetre; Graeme Rinholm	Four-man	55.17	6	59.91	27	55.72	8	Did not advance		2:50.80	27

* – Denotes the driver of each sled
** – According to run results Cody Sorensen and Ben Coakwell were replaced in run 3 by Luke Demetre and Graeme Rinholm.

Women

Athlete	Event	Run 1		Run 2		Run 3		Run 4		Total	
Athlete	Event	Time	Rank	Time	Rank	Time	Rank	Time	Rank	Time	Rank
Jennifer Ciochetti*; Chelsea Valois	Two-woman	58.43	13	58.63	15	58.72	12	58.71	11	3:54.49	13
Kaillie Humphries*; Heather Moyse	Two-woman	57.39	2	57.73	2	57.57	1	57.92	1	3:50.61	1st place, gold medalist(s)

* – Denotes the driver of each sled

== Cross-country skiing ==
Cross Country Ski Canada formally announced the athletes for Sochi on January 14. Brittany Webster and Amanda Ammar were added to the team on January 24, 2014.

Distance
Men

Athlete	Event	Classical		Freestyle		Total		
Athlete	Event	Time	Rank	Time	Rank	Time	Deficit	Rank
Ivan Babikov	15 km classical	—N/a				41:49.2	+3:19.5	39
Alex Harvey	15 km classical	—N/a				DNF		
Devon Kershaw	15 km classical	—N/a				41:17.1	+2:47.4	35
Graeme Killick	15 km classical	—N/a				44:04.8	+5:35.1	65
Ivan Babikov	30 km skiathlon	36:47.6	28	32:58.2	20	1:10:14.6	+1:59.2	25
Alex Harvey	30 km skiathlon	36:46.6	27	32:43.5	17	1:10:00.2	+1:44.8	18
Graeme Killick	30 km skiathlon	38:18.2	49	34:22.9	42	1:13:16.1	+5:00.7	45
Ivan Babikov	50 km freestyle	—N/a				1:47:41.8	+46.6	20
Jesse Cockney	50 km freestyle	—N/a				1:59:16.6	+12:21.4	56
Alex Harvey	50 km freestyle	—N/a				1:47:40.9	+45.7	19
Graeme Killick	50 km freestyle	—N/a				1:48:22.4	+1:27.2	28
Ivan Babikov; Jesse Cockney; Graeme Killick; Len Väljas	4×10 km relay	—N/a				1:33:19.0	+4:37.0	12

Women

Athlete	Event	Classical		Freestyle		Total		
Athlete	Event	Time	Rank	Time	Rank	Time	Deficit	Rank
Amanda Ammar	10 km classical	—N/a				32:58.8	+4:31.0	52
Daria Gaiazova	10 km classical	—N/a				31:47.0	+3:29.2	41
Brittany Webster	10 km classical	—N/a				31:41.0	+3:23.2	39
Heidi Widmer	10 km classical	—N/a				33:01.9	+4:44.1	54
Amanda Ammar	15 km skiathlon	21:39.3	54	22:07.6	57	44:24.3	+5:50.7	55
Emily Nishikawa	15 km skiathlon	20:42.6	46	20:45.4	39	42:04.7	+3:31.1	42
Brittany Webster	15 km skiathlon	21:01.6	48	21:47.2	55	43:25.6	+4:52.0	51
Amanda Ammar	30 km freestyle	—N/a				1:22:03.7	+10:58.5	49
Emily Nishikawa	30 km freestyle	—N/a				1:21:38.6	+10:33.4	47
Brittany Webster	30 km freestyle	—N/a				1:21:05.5	+10:00.3	46
Heidi Widmer	30 km freestyle	—N/a				1:24:11.5	+13:06.3	52
Daria Gaiazova; Perianne Jones; Emily Nishikawa; Brittany Webster	4×5 km relay	—N/a				59:13.6	+6:10.9	14

Sprint
Men

Athlete	Event	Qualification		Quarterfinal		Semifinal		Final	
Athlete	Event	Time	Rank	Time	Rank	Time	Rank	Time	Rank
Jesse Cockney	Sprint	3:44.36	53	Did not advance					
Alex Harvey	Sprint	3:36.08	19 Q	3:37.89	4	Did not advance			
Devon Kershaw	Sprint	3:45.77	53	Did not advance					
Len Väljas	Sprint	3:39.87	36	Did not advance					
Alex Harvey; Devon Kershaw	Team sprint	—N/a				24:20.37	6	Did not advance	

Women

Athlete	Event	Qualification		Quarterfinal		Semifinal		Final	
Athlete	Event	Time	Rank	Time	Rank	Time	Rank	Time	Rank
Chandra Crawford	Sprint	2:43.59	44	Did not advance					
Daria Gaiazova	Sprint	2:40.04	27 Q	2:40.45	5	Did not advance			
Perianne Jones	Sprint	2:38.63	23 Q	2:38.66	5	Did not advance			
Heidi Widmer	Sprint	2:43.36	43	Did not advance					
Daria Gaiazova; Perianne Jones	Team sprint	—N/a				17:09.13	5	Did not advance	

== Curling ==
Based on results from 2012 World Women's Curling Championship and the 2013 World Women's Curling Championship, Canada has qualified their men's and women's teams as one of the seven highest ranked nations. The men's and women's teams were selected through the Olympic Curling Trials held in Winnipeg from December 1 to 8 in 2013.

=== Men's tournament ===
- Brad Jacobs
- Ryan Fry
- E. J. Harnden
- Ryan Harnden
- Caleb Flaxey

Final round robin standings
Team	Skip	Pld	W	L	PF	PA	EW	EL	BE	SE	S%	Qualification
Sweden	Niklas Edin	9	8	1	60	44	38	30	18	8	86%	Playoffs
Canada	Brad Jacobs	9	7	2	69	53	39	36	14	7	84%	Playoffs
China	Liu Rui	9	7	2	67	50	41	37	11	5	85%	Playoffs
Norway	Thomas Ulsrud	9	5	4	52	53	36	33	18	5	86%	Tiebreaker
Great Britain	David Murdoch	9	5	4	51	49	37	35	15	8	83%	Tiebreaker
Denmark	Rasmus Stjerne	9	4	5	54	61	32	37	17	4	81%	
Russia	Andrey Drozdov	9	3	6	58	70	36	38	13	7	77%	
Switzerland	Sven Michel	9	3	6	47	46	31	34	22	7	83%	
United States	John Shuster	9	2	7	47	58	30	39	14	7	80%	
Germany	John Jahr	9	1	8	53	74	38	39	10	9	76%	

Round-robin

Canada has a bye in draws 4, 8 and 12.

Draw 1

Monday, February 10, 9:00 am

Sheet D	1	2	3	4	5	6	7	8	9	10	Final
Germany (Jahr)	0	2	2	0	0	1	0	1	2	0	8
Canada (Jacobs) 🔨	2	0	0	3	2	0	2	0	0	2	11

Draw 2

Monday, February 10, 7:00 pm

Sheet C	1	2	3	4	5	6	7	8	9	10	Final
Canada (Jacobs) 🔨	0	0	0	0	0	2	0	1	0	1	4
Switzerland (Michel)	0	0	0	0	3	0	1	0	1	0	5

Draw 3

Tuesday, February 11, 2:00 pm

Sheet A	1	2	3	4	5	6	7	8	9	10	Final
Canada (Jacobs)	0	0	0	2	0	2	0	0	2	0	6
Sweden (Edin) 🔨	0	2	0	0	2	0	2	0	0	1	7

Draw 5

Wednesday, February 12, 7:00 pm

Sheet C	1	2	3	4	5	6	7	8	9	10	Final
Russia (Drozdov) 🔨	0	1	0	1	0	0	0	2	0	X	4
Canada (Jacobs)	2	0	0	0	4	0	0	0	1	X	7

Draw 6

Thursday, February 13, 2:00 pm

Sheet B	1	2	3	4	5	6	7	8	9	10	Final
Canada (Jacobs)	0	1	0	2	0	2	0	1	0	1	7
Denmark (Stjerne) 🔨	1	0	1	0	1	0	1	0	2	0	6

Draw 7

Friday, February 14, 9:00 am

Sheet D	1	2	3	4	5	6	7	8	9	10	Final
Canada (Jacobs) 🔨	0	1	0	2	0	0	4	0	3	X	10
Norway (Ulsrud)	1	0	1	0	0	1	0	1	0	X	4

Draw 9

Saturday, February 15, 2:00 pm

Sheet C	1	2	3	4	5	6	7	8	9	10	Final
Canada (Jacobs) 🔨	1	0	0	3	0	0	1	0	1	1	7
Great Britain (Murdoch)	0	1	1	0	2	0	0	1	0	0	5

Draw 10

Sunday, February 16, 9:00 am

Sheet A	1	2	3	4	5	6	7	8	9	10	Final
United States (Shuster) 🔨	0	0	2	2	0	1	0	1	0	0	6
Canada (Jacobs)	2	1	0	0	2	0	0	0	2	1	8

Draw 11

Sunday, February 16, 7:00 pm

Sheet B	1	2	3	4	5	6	7	8	9	10	11	Final
China (Liu)	0	0	2	0	3	1	0	0	0	2	0	8
Canada (Jacobs) 🔨	0	2	0	1	0	0	2	1	2	0	1	9

Semifinal

Wednesday, February 19, 7:00 pm

Sheet D	1	2	3	4	5	6	7	8	9	10	Final
Canada (Jacobs) 🔨	1	0	2	0	1	0	3	0	3	X	10
China (Liu)	0	1	0	1	0	2	0	2	0	X	6

Final

Friday, February 21, 5:30 pm

Sheet C	1	2	3	4	5	6	7	8	9	10	Final
Canada (Jacobs) 🔨	2	0	3	1	0	2	0	1	X	X	9
Great Britain (Murdoch)	0	1	0	0	1	0	1	0	X	X	3

=== Women's tournament ===
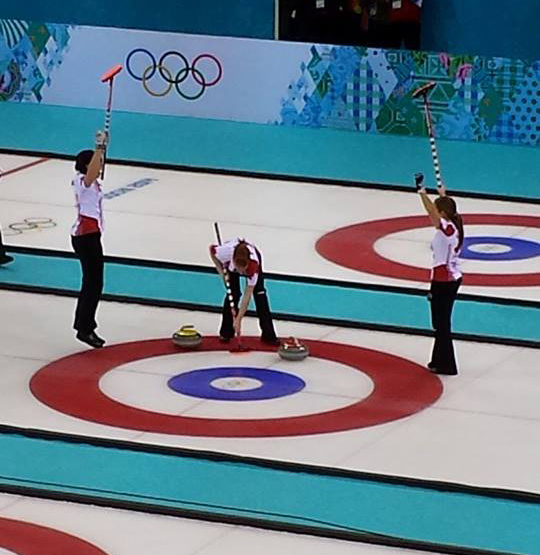
Canada winning the gold medal

- Jennifer Jones
- Kaitlyn Lawes
- Jill Officer
- Dawn McEwen
- Kirsten Wall

Final round robin standings
Team	Skip	Pld	W	L	PF	PA	EW	EL	BE	SE	S%	Qualification
Canada	Jennifer Jones	9	9	0	72	40	43	27	12	14	86%	Playoffs
Sweden	Margaretha Sigfridsson	9	7	2	58	52	37	35	13	7	80%	Playoffs
Switzerland	Mirjam Ott	9	5	4	63	60	37	38	13	7	78%	Playoffs
Great Britain	Eve Muirhead	9	5	4	74	58	39	35	9	11	80%	Playoffs
Japan	Ayumi Ogasawara	9	4	5	59	67	39	41	4	10	76%	
Denmark	Lene Nielsen	9	4	5	57	56	34	40	12	9	78%	
China	Wang Bingyu	9	4	5	58	62	36	38	10	4	81%	
South Korea	Kim Ji-sun	9	3	6	60	65	35	37	10	6	79%	
Russia	Anna Sidorova	9	3	6	48	56	33	35	19	6	82%	
United States	Erika Brown	9	1	8	42	75	33	40	8	5	76%	

Round-robin

Canada has a bye in draws 3, 7 and 11.

Draw 1

Monday, February 10, 2:00 pm

Sheet A	1	2	3	4	5	6	7	8	9	10	Final
China (Wang)	0	0	0	1	0	1	0	X	X	X	2
Canada (Jones) 🔨	0	2	1	0	3	0	3	X	X	X	9

Draw 2

Tuesday, February 11, 9:00 am

Sheet B	1	2	3	4	5	6	7	8	9	10	Final
Sweden (Sigfridsson)	0	0	1	0	1	0	1	0	X	X	3
Canada (Jones) 🔨	0	2	0	2	0	2	0	3	X	X	9

Draw 4

Wednesday, February 12, 2:00 pm

Sheet D	1	2	3	4	5	6	7	8	9	10	Final
Canada (Jones)	1	0	2	0	3	0	1	0	1	1	9
Great Britain (Muirhead) 🔨	0	1	0	2	0	2	0	1	0	0	6

Draw 5

Thursday, February 13, 9:00 am

Sheet B	1	2	3	4	5	6	7	8	9	10	Final
Canada (Jones) 🔨	1	0	2	1	0	0	1	0	3	X	8
Denmark (Nielsen)	0	3	0	0	0	0	0	2	0	X	5

Draw 6

Thursday, February 13, 7:00 pm

Sheet C	1	2	3	4	5	6	7	8	9	10	Final
Switzerland (Ott)	0	0	0	2	0	0	1	2	0	X	5
Canada (Jones) 🔨	0	1	1	0	2	1	0	0	3	X	8

Draw 8

Saturday, February 15, 9:00 am

Sheet A	1	2	3	4	5	6	7	8	9	10	Final
Canada (Jones)🔨	2	0	2	0	0	0	2	1	0	1	8
Japan (Ogasawara)	0	2	0	2	1	0	0	0	1	0	6

Draw 9

Saturday, February 15, 7:00 pm

Sheet B	1	2	3	4	5	6	7	8	9	10	Final
Canada (Jones)	0	0	3	0	2	0	0	0	0	X	5
Russia (Sidorova) 🔨	0	1	0	1	0	0	0	0	1	X	3

Draw 10

Sunday, February 16, 2:00 pm

Sheet D	1	2	3	4	5	6	7	8	9	10	11	Final
United States (Brown)	0	0	3	0	1	0	0	1	0	1	0	6
Canada (Jones) 🔨	2	1	0	1	0	1	1	0	0	0	1	7

Draw 12

Monday, February 17, 7:00 pm

Sheet C	1	2	3	4	5	6	7	8	9	10	Final
Canada (Jones)	0	1	0	2	1	0	1	2	2	X	9
South Korea (Kim) 🔨	2	0	2	0	0	0	0	0	0	X	4

Semifinals

Wednesday, February 19, 2:00 pm

Team	1	2	3	4	5	6	7	8	9	10	Final
Canada (Jones) 🔨	2	1	0	1	0	1	0	0	0	1	6
Great Britain (Muirhead)	0	0	2	0	1	0	0	0	1	0	4

Final

Thursday, February 20, 5:30 pm

Team	1	2	3	4	5	6	7	8	9	10	Final
Canada (Jones) 🔨	1	0	0	2	0	0	0	1	2	X	6
Sweden (Sigfridsson)	0	1	0	0	2	0	0	0	0	X	3

== Figure skating ==
Canada has achieved the following quota places with their results at the 2013 World Figure Skating Championships:

Athlete	Event	SP/SD		FS/FD		Total	
Athlete	Event	Points	Rank	Points	Rank	Points	Rank
Patrick Chan	Men's singles	97.52	2 Q	178.10	2	275.62	2nd place, silver medalist(s)
Liam Firus	Men's singles	55.04	28	Did not advance			
Kevin Reynolds	Men's singles	68.76	17 Q	153.47	10	222.23	15
Gabrielle Daleman	Ladies' singles	52.61	19 Q	95.83	16	148.44	17
Kaetlyn Osmond	Ladies' singles	56.18	13 Q	112.80	13	168.98	13
Meagan Duhamel / Eric Radford	Pairs	72.21	5 Q	127.32	7	199.53	7
Paige Lawrence / Rudi Swiegers	Pairs	58.97	13 Q	103.01	14	161.98	14
Kirsten Moore-Towers / Dylan Moscovitch	Pairs	70.92	6 Q	131.18	5	202.10	5
Alexandra Paul / Mitchell Islam	Ice dancing	55.91	18 Q	82.79	16	138.70	18
Tessa Virtue / Scott Moir	Ice dancing	76.33	2 Q	114.66	2	190.99	2nd place, silver medalist(s)
Kaitlyn Weaver / Andrew Poje	Ice dancing	65.93	7 Q	103.18	5	169.11	7

Team trophy

Athlete	Event	Short program/Short dance						Free skate/Free dance					
Athlete	Event	Men's	Ladies'	Pairs	Ice dance	Total		Men's	Ladies'	Pairs	Ice dance	Total	
Athlete	Event	Points Team points	Points Team points	Points Team points	Points Team points	Points	Rank	Points Team points	Points Team points	Points Team points	Points Team points	Points	Rank
Patrick Chan (M); Kevin Reynolds (M); Kaetlyn Osmond (L); Meagan Duhamel / Eric Radford (P); Kirsten Moore-Towers / Dylan Moscovitch (P); Tessa Virtue / Scott Moir (I)	Team trophy	89.71; 8	62.54; 6	73.10; 9	72.98; 9	32	2 Q	167.92; 9	110.73; 6	129.74; 9	107.56; 9	65	2nd place, silver medalist(s)

== Freestyle skiing ==
9 provisional spots were already filled by the Canadian Freestyle Ski Association. The remainder of the team besides ski cross was announced on January 20, 2014. The remainder of the ski cross team will be announced on January 27. Due to the depth of the Canadian team many athletes ranked high up will not get the chance to go, because of the quota limit of 26. This also meant Canada would not send any women in the aerials event, in which it won two medals in 2002. Megan Gunning was named to the team in ski halfpipe but she was injured preparing for the Winter X Games XVIII, moguls skier Philippe Marquis was named to the team in her place on January 23, 2014. The members of the ski cross team were named on January 27, 2014, to complete the freestyle skiing team.

Aerials

Athlete	Event	Qualification				Final					
Athlete	Event	Jump 1		Jump 2		Jump 1		Jump 2		Jump 3	
Athlete	Event	Points	Rank	Points	Rank	Points	Rank	Points	Rank	Points	Rank
Travis Gerrits	Men's aerials	76.92	19	112.39	10 Q	107.29	6 Q	111.95	7	Did not advance	

Halfpipe

Athlete	Event	Qualification				Final			
Athlete	Event	Run 1	Run 2	Best	Rank	Run 1	Run 2	Best	Rank
Noah Bowman	Men's halfpipe	80.60	77.80	80.60	7 Q	80.40	82.60	82.60	5
Justin Dorey	Men's halfpipe	91.60	6.40	91.60	1 Q	20.40	14.20	20.40	12
Matt Margetts	Men's halfpipe	66.80	17.80	66.80	15	Did not advance			
Mike Riddle	Men's halfpipe	82.20	75.00	82.20	6 Q	71.40	90.60	90.60	2nd place, silver medalist(s)
Rosalind Groenewoud	Women's halfpipe	82.00	78.40	82.00	6 Q	5.40	74.20	74.20	7
Keltie Hansen	Women's halfpipe	8.60	66.20	66.20	13	Did not advance			

Moguls

Athlete	Event	Qualification								Final											
Athlete	Event	Run 1				Run 2				Run 1				Run 2				Run 3			
Athlete	Event	Time	Points	Total	Rank	Time	Points	Total	Rank	Time	Points	Total	Rank	Time	Points	Total	Rank	Time	Points	Total	Rank
Alexandre Bilodeau	Men's moguls	25.03	18.50	24.70	1 Q	Bye				24.78	16.17	22.49	8 Q	25.91	18.11	23.89	3 Q	24.81	20.01	26.31	1st place, gold medalist(s)
Marc-Antoine Gagnon	Men's moguls	25.44	16.90	22.90	5 Q	Bye				25.79	17.61	23.45	4 Q	25.61	18.24	24.16	2 Q	25.56	17.4	23.35	4
Mikaël Kingsbury	Men's moguls	25.75	17.95	23.81	2 Q	Bye				26.32	18.72	24.31	3 Q	26.37	18.97	24.54	1 Q	25.25	18.62	24.71	2nd place, silver medalist(s)
Philippe Marquis	Men's moguls	25.65	16.52	22.43	6 Q	Bye				24.58	17.91	24.32	2 Q	24.07	15.6	22.25	9	Did not advance			
Chloé Dufour-Lapointe	Women's moguls	30.80	16.92	22.64	2 Q	Bye				31.90	16.36	21.65	3 Q	31.97	16.44	21.70	2 Q	31.71	16.30	21.66	2nd place, silver medalist(s)
Justine Dufour-Lapointe	Women's moguls	32.02	17.04	22.28	3 Q	Bye				31.82	16.22	21.54	4 Q	31.96	16.38	21.64	3 Q	31.56	17.02	22.44	1st place, gold medalist(s)
Maxime Dufour-Lapointe	Women's moguls	31.22	15.32	20.88	8 Q	Bye				31.90	15.04	20.33	11 Q	31.25	13.10	18.64	12	Did not advance			
Audrey Robichaud	Women's moguls	33.55	15.98	20.61	9 Q	Bye				33.20	15.64	20.41	10 Q	33.50	15.70	20.35	10	Did not advance			

Ski cross

Athlete	Event	Seeding		Round of 16	Quarterfinal	Semifinal	Final	
Athlete	Event	Time	Rank	Position	Position	Position	Position	Rank
Chris Del Bosco	Men's ski cross	1:15.91	2	3	Did not advance			17
Dave Duncan	Men's ski cross	1:17.31	6	4	Did not advance			26
Brady Leman	Men's ski cross	1:16.43	3	1 Q	1 Q	1 FA	4	4
Kelsey Serwa	Women's ski cross	1:21.45	1	1 Q	1 Q	2 FA	2	2nd place, silver medalist(s)
Georgia Simmerling	Women's ski cross	1:22.52	8	1 Q	DNF	Did not advance		14
Marielle Thompson	Women's ski cross	1:21.56	3	1 Q	1 Q	1 FA	1	1st place, gold medalist(s)

Qualification legend: FA – Qualify to medal round; FB – Qualify to consolation round

Slopestyle

Athlete	Event	Qualification				Final			
Athlete	Event	Run 1	Run 2	Best	Rank	Run 1	Run 2	Best	Rank
Alex Beaulieu-Marchand	Men's slopestyle	20.00	85.60	85.60	6 Q	5.00	21.40	21.40	12
Dara Howell	Women's slopestyle	88.80	35.20	88.80	1 Q	94.20	48.40	94.20	1st place, gold medalist(s)
Kim Lamarre	Women's slopestyle	85.40	38.00	85.40	2 Q	15.00	85.00	85.00	3rd place, bronze medalist(s)
Yuki Tsubota	Women's slopestyle	76.60	81.00	81.00	4 Q	71.60	28.40	71.60	6
Kaya Turski	Women's slopestyle	14.60	28.00	28.00	19	Did not advance			

== Ice hockey ==
=== Men's tournament ===
Canada qualified a men's team by being one of the 9 highest ranked teams in the IIHF World Ranking following the 2012 World Championships.

The following is the Canadian roster for the men's ice hockey tournament at the 2014 Winter Olympics.

No.	Pos.	Name	Height	Weight	Birthdate	Birthplace	2013–14 team
1	G	Roberto Luongo	191 cm (6 ft 3 in)	93 kg (205 lb)	4 April 1979	Montreal, QC	(Canada) Vancouver Canucks (NHL)
2	D	Duncan Keith	183 cm (6 ft 0 in)	85 kg (187 lb)	16 July 1983	Winnipeg, MB	(United States) Chicago Blackhawks (NHL)
5	D	Dan Hamhuis	185 cm (6 ft 1 in)	95 kg (209 lb)	13 December 1982	Smithers, BC	(Canada) Vancouver Canucks (NHL)
6	D	Shea Weber – A	191 cm (6 ft 3 in)	97 kg (214 lb)	14 August 1985	Sicamous, BC	(United States) Nashville Predators (NHL)
8	D	Drew Doughty	185 cm (6 ft 1 in)	92 kg (203 lb)	8 December 1989	London, ON	(United States) Los Angeles Kings (NHL)
9	F	Matt Duchene	180 cm (5 ft 11 in)	91 kg (201 lb)	16 January 1991	Haliburton, ON	(United States) Colorado Avalanche (NHL)
10	F	Patrick Sharp	185 cm (6 ft 1 in)	89 kg (196 lb)	27 December 1981	Winnipeg, MB	(United States) Chicago Blackhawks (NHL)
12	F	Patrick Marleau	188 cm (6 ft 2 in)	100 kg (220 lb)	15 December 1979	Aneroid, SK	(United States) San Jose Sharks (NHL)
14	F	Chris Kunitz	183 cm (6 ft 0 in)	90 kg (200 lb)	26 September 1979	Regina, SK	(United States) Pittsburgh Penguins (NHL)
15	F	Ryan Getzlaf	193 cm (6 ft 4 in)	100 kg (220 lb)	10 May 1985	Regina, SK	(United States) Anaheim Ducks (NHL)
16	F	Jonathan Toews – A	188 cm (6 ft 2 in)	96 kg (212 lb)	29 April 1988	Winnipeg, MB	(United States) Chicago Blackhawks (NHL)
19	D	Jay Bouwmeester	193 cm (6 ft 4 in)	98 kg (216 lb)	27 September 1983	Edmonton, AB	(United States) St. Louis Blues (NHL)
20	F	John Tavares	183 cm (6 ft 0 in)	90 kg (200 lb)	20 September 1990	Mississauga, ON	(United States) New York Islanders (NHL)
22	F	Jamie Benn	188 cm (6 ft 2 in)	93 kg (205 lb)	18 July 1989	Victoria, BC	(United States) Dallas Stars (NHL)
24	F	Corey Perry	191 cm (6 ft 3 in)	95 kg (209 lb)	16 May 1985	Peterborough, ON	(United States) Anaheim Ducks (NHL)
26	F	Martin St. Louis	172 cm (5 ft 8 in)	82 kg (181 lb)	18 June 1975	Laval, QC	(United States) Tampa Bay Lightning (NHL)
27	D	Alex Pietrangelo	191 cm (6 ft 3 in)	93 kg (205 lb)	10 October 1990	King City, ON	(United States) St. Louis Blues (NHL)
31	G	Carey Price	190 cm (6 ft 3 in)	99 kg (218 lb)	16 August 1987	Vancouver, BC	(Canada) Montreal Canadiens (NHL)
37	F	Patrice Bergeron	188 cm (6 ft 2 in)	88 kg (194 lb)	24 July 1985	L'Ancienne-Lorette, QC	(United States) Boston Bruins (NHL)
41	G	Mike Smith	191 cm (6 ft 3 in)	98 kg (216 lb)	22 March 1982	Kingston, ON	(United States) Phoenix Coyotes (NHL)
44	D	Marc-Édouard Vlasic	185 cm (6 ft 1 in)	91 kg (201 lb)	30 March 1987	Montreal, QC	(United States) San Jose Sharks (NHL)
61	F	Rick Nash	193 cm (6 ft 4 in)	99 kg (218 lb)	16 June 1984	Brampton, ON	(United States) New York Rangers (NHL)
76	D	P. K. Subban	183 cm (6 ft 0 in)	98 kg (216 lb)	13 May 1989	Toronto, ON	(Canada) Montreal Canadiens (NHL)
77	F	Jeff Carter	193 cm (6 ft 4 in)	95 kg (209 lb)	1 January 1985	London, ON	(United States) Los Angeles Kings (NHL)
87	F	Sidney Crosby – C	180 cm (5 ft 11 in)	90 kg (200 lb)	7 August 1987	Cole Harbour, NS	(United States) Pittsburgh Penguins (NHL)

Forward Steven Stamkos was also selected but was unable to participate due to injury. He was replaced by Martin St. Louis.

Group stage

Team	Pld	W	OTW	OTL	L	GF	GA	GD	Pts	Qualification
Canada	3	2	1	0	0	11	2	+9	8	Quarterfinals
Finland	3	2	0	1	0	15	7	+8	7	Quarterfinals
Austria	3	1	0	0	2	7	15	−8	3	
Norway	3	0	0	0	3	3	12	−9	0	

Source: IIHF

13 February 2014; 21:00	Canada	3–1 (0–0, 2–0, 1–1)	Norway	Bolshoy Ice Dome, Sochi; Attendance: 10,261

Game reference

Carey Price
Goalies
Lars Haugen
Referees:
(Canada) Mike Leggo
(Sweden) Marcus Vinnerborg
Linesmen:
(United States) Andy McElman
(United States) Chris Woodworth

S. Weber (D. Keith, P. Bergeron) – 26:20	1–0
J. Benn (P. Bergeron, D. Doughty) – 35:19	2–0
	2–1	40:22 – P. Thoresen (M. Olimb) (PP)
D. Doughty (R. Getzlaf, P. Marleau) – 41:47	3–1

10 min
Penalties
6 min
38
Shots
20

14 February 2014; 21:00	Canada	6–0 (2–0, 4–0, 0–0)	Austria	Bolshoy Ice Dome, Sochi; Attendance: 8,969

Game reference

Roberto Luongo
Goalies
Bernhard Starkbaum (out 40:00)
Mathias Lange (in 40:00)
Referees:
(Canada) Dave Jackson
(Russia) Konstantin Olenin
Linesmen:
(Canada) Lonnie Cameron
(Slovakia) Miroslav Valach

D. Doughty (J. Toews) – 5:24	1–0
S. Weber (C. Perry, R. Getzlaf) – 10:12	2–0
J. Carter (P. Marleau, S. Crosby) – 22:39	3–0
J. Carter (P. Marleau, A. Pietrangelo) – 24:09	4–0
J. Carter (P. Marleau, S. Weber) – 34:33	5–0
R. Getzlaf (SH) – 36:48	6–0

8 min
Penalties
2 min
46
Shots
23

16 February 2014; 21:00	Finland	1–2 (OT) (0–1, 1–0, 0–0, 0–1)	Canada	Bolshoy Ice Dome, Sochi; Attendance: 11,263

Game reference

Tuukka Rask
Goalies
Carey Price
Referees:
(Czech Republic) Antonín Jeřábek
(Canada) Kevin Pollock
Linesmen:
(Belarus) Ivan Dedioulia
(Canada) Brad Kovachik

	0–1	13:44 – D. Doughty (S. Weber, S. Crosby) (PP)
T. Ruutu (J. Jokinen, O. Väänänen) – 38:00	1–1
	1–2	62:32 – D. Doughty (J. Carter)

2 min
Penalties
2 min
15
Shots
27

Quarterfinals

19 February 2014; 21:00	Canada	2–1 (1–1, 0–0, 1–0)	Latvia	Bolshoy Ice Dome, Sochi; Attendance: 9,825

Game reference

Carey Price
Goalies
Kristers Gudļevskis
Referees:
(United States) Tim Peel
(Finland) Jyri Rönn
Linesmen:
(Canada) Brad Kovachik
(Finland) Sakari Suominen

P. Sharp (R. Nash) – 13:37	1–0
	1–1	15:41 – L. Dārziņš (A. Kulda, J. Sprukts)
S. Weber (D. Doughty, J. Toews) (PP) – 53:06	2–1

6 min
Penalties
6 min
57
Shots
16

Semifinals

21 February 2014; 21:00	United States	0–1 (0–0, 0–1, 0–0)	Canada	Bolshoy Ice Dome, Sochi; Attendance: 11,172

Game reference
Jonathan Quick	Goalies	Carey Price	Referees: (United States) Brad Meier (Canada) Kelly Sutherland; Linesmen: (Belarus) Ivan Dedioulia (Canada) Greg Devorski
0–1 / 21:41 – J. Benn (J. Bouwmeester)			Referees: (United States) Brad Meier (Canada) Kelly Sutherland; Linesmen: (Belarus) Ivan Dedioulia (Canada) Greg Devorski
4 min	Penalties	6 min	Referees: (United States) Brad Meier (Canada) Kelly Sutherland; Linesmen: (Belarus) Ivan Dedioulia (Canada) Greg Devorski
31	Shots	37	Referees: (United States) Brad Meier (Canada) Kelly Sutherland; Linesmen: (Belarus) Ivan Dedioulia (Canada) Greg Devorski

Gold medal game

23 February 2014; 16:00	(silver) Sweden	0–3 (0–1, 0–1, 0–1)	Canada (gold)	Bolshoy Ice Dome, Sochi; Attendance: 11,076

Game reference

Henrik Lundqvist
Goalies
Carey Price
Referees:
(United States) Brad Meier
(Canada) Kelly Sutherland
Linesmen:
(Canada) Derek Amell
(Canada) Greg Devorski

0–1	12:55 – J. Toews (J.Carter, S. Weber)
0–2	35:43 – S. Crosby
0–3	49:04 – C. Kunitz

6 min
Penalties
4 min
24
Shots
36

=== Women's tournament ===
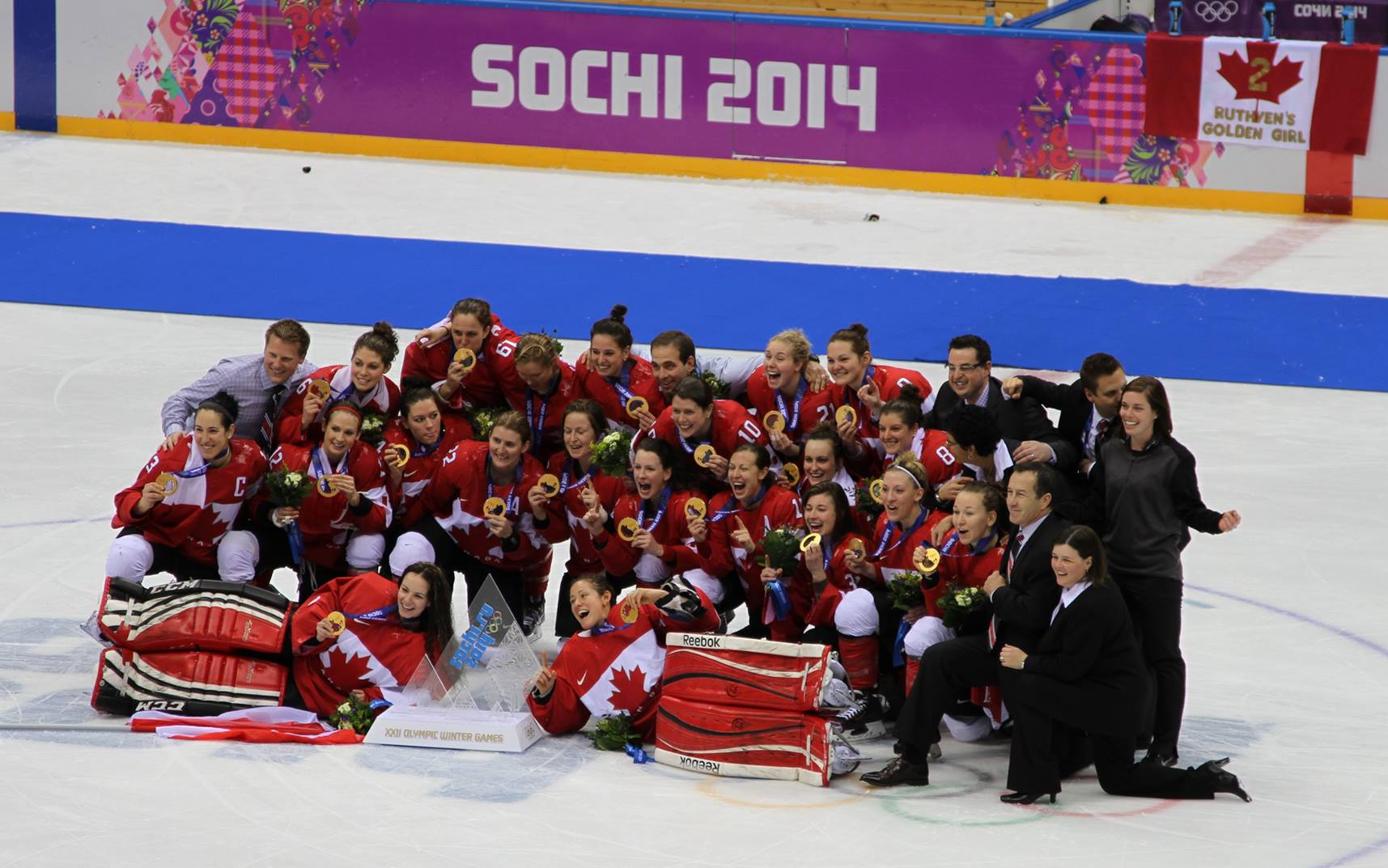
Gold medal team Canada

The women's team qualified by being one of the 5 highest ranked teams in the IIHF World Ranking following the 2012 Women's World Championships.

On December 23 the roster was announced.

The following is the Canadian roster in the women's ice hockey tournament of the 2014 Winter Olympics.

No.	Pos.	Name	Height	Weight	Birthdate	Birthplace	2013–14 team
1	G	Shannon Szabados	175 cm (5 ft 9 in)	65 kg (143 lb)	6 August 1986	Edmonton, AB	(Canada) NWT Centralized Roster
2	F	Meghan Agosta-Marciano	168 cm (5 ft 6 in)	67 kg (148 lb)	12 February 1987	Windsor, ON	(Canada) Montreal Stars (CWHL)
3	D	Jocelyne Larocque	170 cm (5 ft 7 in)	63 kg (139 lb)	19 May 1988	Ste. Anne, MB	(Canada) Calgary Inferno (CWHL)
5	D	Lauriane Rougeau	173 cm (5 ft 8 in)	75 kg (165 lb)	12 April 1990	Pointe-Claire, QC	(United States) Cornell Big Red (NCAA)
6	F	Rebecca Johnston	170 cm (5 ft 7 in)	76 kg (168 lb)	24 September 1989	Sudbury, ON	(Canada) Toronto Furies (CWHL)
8	D	Laura Fortino	164 cm (5 ft 5 in)	62 kg (137 lb)	30 January 1991	Hamilton, ON	(United States) Cornell Big Red (NCAA)
9	F	Jennifer Wakefield	175 cm (5 ft 9 in)	77 kg (170 lb)	15 June 1989	Scarborough, ON	(Canada) Toronto Furies (CWHL)
10	F	Gillian Apps	183 cm (6 ft 0 in)	80 kg (180 lb)	2 November 1983	North York, ON	(Canada) Brampton Thunder (CWHL)
12	D	Meaghan Mikkelson	175 cm (5 ft 9 in)	88 kg (194 lb)	4 January 1985	Regina, SK	(Canada) Calgary Inferno (CWHL)
13	F	Caroline Ouellette – C	180 cm (5 ft 11 in)	77 kg (170 lb)	25 May 1979	Montreal, QC	(Canada) Montreal Stars (CWHL)
15	F	Mélodie Daoust	163 cm (5 ft 4 in)	71 kg (157 lb)	7 January 1992	Valleyfield, QC	(Canada) McGill Martlets (CIS)
16	F	Jayna Hefford – A	163 cm (5 ft 4 in)	63 kg (139 lb)	14 May 1977	Trenton, ON	(Canada) Brampton Thunder (CWHL)
18	D	Catherine Ward – A	168 cm (5 ft 6 in)	67 kg (148 lb)	27 February 1987	Montreal, QC	(Canada) Montreal Stars (CWHL)
19	F	Brianne Jenner	175 cm (5 ft 9 in)	70 kg (150 lb)	4 May 1991	Oakville, ON	(United States) Cornell Big Red (NCAA)
21	F	Haley Irwin	170 cm (5 ft 7 in)	78 kg (172 lb)	6 June 1988	Thunder Bay, ON	(Canada) Montreal Stars (CWHL)
22	F	Hayley Wickenheiser – A	178 cm (5 ft 10 in)	77 kg (170 lb)	12 August 1978	Shaunavon, SK	(Canada) Calgary Dinos (CIS)
24	F	Natalie Spooner	178 cm (5 ft 10 in)	80 kg (180 lb)	17 October 1990	Scarborough, ON	(Canada) Toronto Furies (CWHL)
27	D	Tara Watchorn	178 cm (5 ft 10 in)	76 kg (168 lb)	30 May 1990	Ajax, ON	(Canada) Calgary Inferno (CWHL)
29	F	Marie-Philip Poulin	169 cm (5 ft 7 in)	72 kg (159 lb)	28 March 1991	Quebec City, QC	(United States) Boston University Terriers (NCAA)
31	G	Geneviève Lacasse	173 cm (5 ft 8 in)	67 kg (148 lb)	5 May 1989	Montreal, QC	(United States) Boston Blades (CWHL)
32	G	Charline Labonté	175 cm (5 ft 9 in)	78 kg (172 lb)	15 October 1982	Greenfield Park, QC	(Canada) Montreal Stars (CWHL)

Group stage

Team	Pld	W	OTW	OTL	L	GF	GA	GD	Pts	Qualification
Canada	3	3	0	0	0	11	2	+9	9	Semifinals
United States	3	2	0	0	1	14	4	+10	6	Semifinals
Finland	3	0	1	0	2	5	9	−4	2	Quarterfinals
Switzerland	3	0	0	1	2	3	18	−15	1	Quarterfinals

Source: IIHF

8 February 2014; 17:00	Canada	5–0 (2–0, 3–0, 0–0)	Switzerland	Shayba Arena, Sochi; Attendance: 4,386

Game reference

Charline Labonté
Goalies
Florence Schelling
Referee:
(Norway) Aina Hove
Linesmen:
(United States) Alicia Hanrahan
(Slovakia) Michaela Kúdelová

J. Larocque (N. Spooner) – 01:25	1–0
T. Watchorn (R. Johnston) – 06:30	2–0
H. Wickenheiser (SH) – 23:54	3–0
M-P. Poulin (J. Hefford, R. Johnston) – 32:28	4–0
R. Johnston (M-P. Poulin) – 36:10	5–0

2 min
Penalties
4 min
69
Shots
14

10 February 2014; 19:00	Finland	0–3 (0–0, 0–0, 0–3)	Canada	Shayba Arena, Sochi; Attendance: 4,837

Game reference

Noora Räty
Goalies
Shannon Szabados
Referee:
(United Kingdom) Joy Tottman
Linesmen:
(Sweden) Therese Bjorkman
(United States) Laura Johnson

0–1	49:27 – M. Agosta-Marciano (PP)
0–2	52:24 – J. Hefford
0–3	56:36 – R. Johnston (J. Hefford, M-P. Poulin)

10 min
Penalties
12 min
14
Shots
42

12 February 2014; 16:30	Canada	3–2 (0–0, 0–1, 3–1)	United States	Shayba Arena, Sochi; Attendance: 4,812

Game reference

Charline Labonté
Goalies
Jessica Vetter
Referee:
(Finland) Anna Eskola
Linesmen:
(Czech Republic) Ilona Novotná
(Czech Republic) Zuzana Svobodová

	0–1	37:34 – H. Knight (A. Carpenter, A. Schleper) (PP)
M. Agosta-Marciano (H. Wickenheiser) (PP) – 42:24	1–1
H. Wickenheiser (N. Spooner, M. Agosta-Marciano) – 43:54	2–1
M. Agosta-Marciano – 54:55	3–1
	3–2	58:55 – A. Schleper

8 min
Penalties
10 min
31
Shots
27

Semifinals

17 February 2014; 21:00	Canada	3–1 (3–0, 0–1, 0–0)	Switzerland	Shayba Arena, Sochi; Attendance: 3,378

Game reference

Shannon Szabados
Goalies
Florence Schelling
Referee:
(United States) Erin Blair
Linesmen:
(United States) Alicia Hanrahan
(Czech Republic) Ilona Novotná

N. Spooner (H. Wickenheiser) – 07:29	1–0
N. Spooner (C. Ward, H. Wickenheiser) (PP) – 11:10	2–0
M. Daoust (J. Wakefield) – 11:33	3–0
	3–1	25:14 – J. Lutz (S. Benz, L. Benz) (PP)

12 min
Penalties
10 min
48
Shots
22

Gold medal game

20 February 2014; 21:00	(gold) Canada	3–2 OT (0–0, 0–1, 2–1) (OT 1–0)	United States (silver)	Bolshoy Ice Dome, Sochi; Attendance: 10,639

Game reference

Shannon Szabados
Goalies
Jessie Vetter
Referee:
(United Kingdom) Joy Tottman
Linesmen:
(Czech Republic) Ilona Novotná
(Czech Republic) Zuzana Svobodová

	0–1	31:57 – M. Duggan (J. Lamoureux)
	0–2	42:01 – A. Carpenter (H. Knight, K. Stack)
B. Jenner (M. Mikkelson, J. Larocque) – 56:34	1–2
M-P. Poulin (R. Johnston, H. Irwin) (EA) – 59:05	2–2
M-P. Poulin (L. Fortino) (PP2) – 68:10	3–2

10 min
Penalties
14 min
31
Shots
29

== Luge ==
Based on world rankings between November 1, 2013, and December 31, 2013, Canada has qualified 3 men, 3 women, 1 doubles team, and a relay team.

On December 17, 2013, Canada nominated athletes for all but one spot on the women's roster to the Olympic team. The final spot on the women's roster was decided by a race off which was won by Arianne Jones and she was added to the team on December 23, 2013.

Men

Athlete	Event	Run 1		Run 2		Run 3		Run 4		Total	
Athlete	Event	Time	Rank	Time	Rank	Time	Rank	Time	Rank	Time	Rank
Samuel Edney	Singles	52.783	14	52.546	6	52.268	11	52.180	9	3:29.777	11
John Fennell	Singles	53.350	27	53.561	30	52.879	27	52.926	29	3:32.716	27
Mitchel Malyk	Singles	53.367	28	53.401	29	52.756	=24	52.633	24	3:32.157	26
Tristan Walker; Justin Snith	Doubles	49.857	4	49.983	6	—N/a				1:39.840	4

Women

Athlete	Event	Run 1		Run 2		Run 3		Run 4		Total	
Athlete	Event	Time	Rank	Time	Rank	Time	Rank	Time	Rank	Time	Rank
Alex Gough	Singles	50.464	5	50.402	5	50.286	4	50.426	5	3:21.578	4
Arianne Jones	Singles	50.993	13	50.837	15	50.745	11	50.608	10	3:23.183	13
Kimberley McRae	Singles	50.465	6	50.454	6	50.356	5	50.620	=11	3:21.895	5

Mixed team relay

Athlete	Event	Run 1		Run 2		Run 3		Total	
Athlete	Event	Time	Rank	Time	Rank	Time	Rank	Time	Rank
Sam Edney; Alex Gough; Justin Snith; Tristan Walker	Team relay	54.643	4	56.197	5	56.555	5	2:47.395	4

== Short track speed skating ==
Canada qualified five skaters of each gender for the Olympics during World Cup 3 and 4 in November 2013. They qualified the maximum number of starting places with 3 for each gender in each distance (500, 1000 and 1500 m) and both a men's and women's relay team.

The team of 10 was nominated for the Games on August 29, 2013, and which skaters were competing in each individual distances was announced on January 14. Jessica Gregg was the 5th woman to qualify for the team but she did not skate in any individual distances or in the relay.

Men

Athlete	Event	Heat		Quarterfinal		Semifinal		Final	
Athlete	Event	Time	Rank	Time	Rank	Time	Rank	Time	Rank
Charle Cournoyer	500 m	41.180	1 Q	41.060	2 Q	40.945	2 FA	41.617	3rd place, bronze medalist(s)
Charle Cournoyer	1000 m	1:24.787	1 Q	1:25.204	5	Did not advance			17
Michael Gilday	1500 m	2:16.468	2 Q	—N/a		DSQ		Did not advance	17
Charles Hamelin	500 m	1:18.871	4	Did not advance					32
Charles Hamelin	1000 m	1:25.742	1 Q	1:40.408	4	Did not advance			14
Charles Hamelin	1500 m	2:16.903	1 Q	—N/a		2:14.480	1 FA	2:14.985	1st place, gold medalist(s)
François Hamelin	1500 m	2:13.935	2 Q	—N/a		2:16.473	4 FB	2:21.592	9
Olivier Jean	500 m	41.616	1 Q	41.760	4	Did not advance			13
Olivier Jean	1000 m	1:26.089	1 Q	1:24.935	3	Did not advance			9
Charle Cournoyer; Michael Gilday; Charles Hamelin; François Hamelin; Olivier Jean	5000 m relay	—N/a				6:48.186	4 FB	6:43.747	6

Women

Athlete	Event	Heat		Quarterfinal		Semifinal		Final	
Athlete	Event	Time	Rank	Time	Rank	Time	Rank	Time	Rank
Marie-Ève Drolet	1000 m	1:31.273	2 Q	1:31.668	2	Did not advance			12
Marie-Ève Drolet	1500 m	2:24.859	2 Q	—N/a		2:19.516	3 FB	2:25.870	8
Jessica Hewitt	500 m	43.447	2 Q	1:00.971	4	Did not advance			13
Valérie Maltais	500 m	44.093	1 Q	43.550	3	Did not advance			9
Valérie Maltais	1000 m	1:28.771 OR	1 Q	1:29.037	1 Q	1:56.511	4 FB	1:36.863	6
Valérie Maltais	1500 m	2:27.721	2 Q	—N/a		2:23.069	3 FB	2:24.711	6
Marianne St-Gelais	500 m	43.729	1 Q	43.595	2 Q	44.069	3 FB	44.359	7
Marianne St-Gelais	1000 m	2:05.206	4	Did not advance					28
Marianne St-Gelais	1500 m	2:27.071	4	—N/a		Did not advance			22
Marie-Ève Drolet; Jessica Hewitt; Valérie Maltais; Marianne St-Gelais	3000 m relay	—N/a				4:08.871	2 FA	4:10.641	2nd place, silver medalist(s)

Qualification legend: ADV – Advanced due to being impeded by another skater; FA – Qualify to medal round; FB – Qualify to consolation round

== Skeleton ==
Canada announced the four athletes for Sochi in December 2013.

Athlete	Event	Run 1		Run 2		Run 3		Run 4		Total	
Athlete	Event	Time	Rank	Time	Rank	Time	Rank	Time	Rank	Time	Rank
John Fairbairn	Men's	57.34	11	56.92	4	56.91	7	56.96	10	3:48.13	7
Eric Neilson	Men's	57.41	12	57.01	8	57.25	14	57.10	14	3:48.77	13
Mellisa Hollingsworth	Women's	59.68	15	59.70	16	58.68	10	58.15	2	3:56.21	11
Sarah Reid	Women's	59.14	7	59.17	8	58.27	4	58.15	2	3:54.73	7

== Ski Jumping ==
The ski jumping team was named on January 26, 2014, in Vancouver. Alexandra Pretorius later withdrew due to injury and was not replaced.

Men

Athlete	Event	Qualification			First round			Final			Total	
Athlete	Event	Distance	Points	Rank	Distance	Points	Rank	Distance	Points	Rank	Points	Rank
Mackenzie Boyd-Clowes	Normal hill	95.0	113.4	21 Q	96.0	114.4	36	Did not advance				
Dusty Korek	Normal hill	92.5	107.4	28 Q	93.5	111.1	39	Did not advance				
Trevor Morrice	Normal hill	86.0	88.7	47	Did not advance							
Matthew Rowley	Normal hill	90.5	100.0	41	Did not advance							
Mackenzie Boyd-Clowes	Large hill	124.0	105.5	19 Q	132.0	120.1	19 Q	123.5	117.8	24	237.9	25
Dusty Korek	Large hill	109.0	82.7	42	Did not advance							
Trevor Morrice	Large hill	113.0	84.5	40 Q	121.5	103.4	42	Did not advance				
Matthew Rowley	Large hill	110.5	88.4	38 Q	DSQ			Did not advance				
Mackenzie Boyd-Clowes; Dusty Korek; Trevor Morrice; Matthew Rowley	Team large hill	—N/a			488.0	399.2	12	Did not advance				

Women

Athlete	Event	First round			Final			Total	
Athlete	Event	Distance	Points	Rank	Distance	Points	Rank	Points	Rank
Taylor Henrich	Normal hill	97.5	118.2	7	96.0	112.2	14	230.4	13
Atsuko Tanaka	Normal hill	97.5	117.8	8	90.7	113.5	12	231.3	12

== Snowboarding ==
Canada pre-qualified six athletes in late October for snowboarding at the 2014 Games in Sochi. The full roster was announced on January 21, 2014.

Alpine
Men

Athlete	Event	Qualification		Round of 16	Quarterfinal	Semifinal	Final	
Athlete	Event	Time	Rank	Opposition Time	Opposition Time	Opposition Time	Opposition Time	Rank
Jasey-Jay Anderson	Giant slalom	1:39.47	13 Q	Marguč (SLO); L +0.47	Did not advance			
Michael Lambert	Giant slalom	1:43.69	27	Did not advance				
Matthew Morison	Giant slalom	1:39.62	14 Q	Bussler (GER); L +0.30	Did not advance			
Jasey-Jay Anderson	Slalom	59.77	15 Q	Košir (SLO); L +0.44	Did not advance			
Michael Lambert	Slalom	59.80	16 Q	Wild (RUS); L +1.78	Did not advance			
Matthew Morison	Slalom	59.66	18	Did not advance				

Women

Athlete	Event	Qualification		Round of 16	Quarterfinal	Semifinal	Final	
Athlete	Event	Time	Rank	Opposition Time	Opposition Time	Opposition Time	Opposition Time	Rank
Caroline Calvé	Giant slalom	1:48.79	8 Q	Ilyukhina (RUS); W −0.03	Takeuchi (JPN); L +4.00	Did not advance		
Ariane Lavigne	Giant slalom	1:51.69	14 Q	Zogg (SUI); W −0.12	Zavarzina (RUS); L +7.27	Did not advance		
Marianne Leeson	Giant slalom	1:47.41	5 Q	Jenny (SUI); W −0.30	Meschik (AUT); L +0.30	Did not advance		
Caroline Calvé	Slalom	1:06.15	26	Did not advance				
Ariane Lavigne	Slalom	1:05.60	17	Did not advance				
Marianne Leeson	Slalom	1:06.26	27	Did not advance				

Freestyle
Men

Athlete	Event	Qualification				Semifinal				Final			
Athlete	Event	Run 1	Run 2	Best	Rank	Run 1	Run 2	Best	Rank	Run 1	Run 2	Best	Rank
Crispin Lipscomb	Halfpipe	29.25	65.25	65.25	12	Did not advance							
Derek Livingston	Halfpipe	34.25	70.25	70.25	10	Did not advance							
Brad Martin	Halfpipe	31.25	22.50	31.25	19	Did not advance							
Mark McMorris	Slopestyle	29.50	89.25	89.25	7 QS	55.50	89.25	89.25	3 QF	33.75	88.75	88.75	3rd place, bronze medalist(s)
Maxence Parrot	Slopestyle	91.75	97.50	97.50	1 QF	Bye				47.00	87.25	87.25	5
Charles Reid	Slopestyle	54.50	75.50	75.50	9 QS	46.25	43.50	46.25	14	Did not advance			
Sebastien Toutant	Slopestyle	74.25	87.25	87.25	3 QF	Bye				54.50	58.50	58.50	9

Qualification Legend: QF – Qualify directly to final; QS – Qualify to semifinal

Women

Athlete	Event	Qualification				Semifinal				Final			
Athlete	Event	Run 1	Run 2	Best	Rank	Run 1	Run 2	Best	Rank	Run 1	Run 2	Best	Rank
Alexandra Duckworth	Halfpipe	42.25	69.75	69.75	7 QS	30.50	25.75	30.50	11	Did not advance			
Mercedes Nicoll	Halfpipe	43.50	26.50	43.50	12	Did not advance							
Katie Tsuyuki	Halfpipe	45.75	54.25	54.25	9 QS	55.50	56.25	56.25	7	Did not advance			
Jenna Blasman	Slopestyle	60.25	51.50	60.25	6 QS	33.25	10.50	33.25	11	Did not advance			
Spencer O'Brien	Slopestyle	82.75	65.00	82.25	3 QF	Bye				30.00	35.00	35.00	12

Qualification Legend: QF – Qualify directly to final; QS – Qualify to semifinal

Snowboard cross

Athlete	Event	Seeding		Round of 16	Quarterfinal	Semifinal	Final	
Athlete	Event	Time	Rank	Position	Position	Position	Position	Rank
Rob Fagan	Men's snowboard cross	CAN		DSQ	Did not advance			25
Kevin Hill	Men's snowboard cross	CAN		3 Q	2 Q	DNF FB	2	7
Jake Holden	Men's snowboard cross	CAN		4	Did not advance			25
Chris Robanske	Men's snowboard cross	CAN		2 Q	DSQ	Did not advance		17
Dominique Maltais	Women's snowboard cross	1:22.26	3	—N/a	1 Q	1 FA	2	2nd place, silver medalist(s)
Maëlle Ricker	Women's snowboard cross	1:22.44	4	—N/a	DNF	Did not advance		21

Qualification legend: FA – Qualify to medal round; FB – Qualify to consolation round

== Speed skating ==
The members of the team were decided following the Olympic Selections and Canadian Single Distances Championships held December 28 – January 3. The team was named on January 22, 2014:

Men

Athlete	Event	Race 1		Race 2		Final	
Athlete	Event	Time	Rank	Time	Rank	Time	Rank
Vincent De Haître	1000 m	—N/a				1:10.04	20
Vincent De Haître	1500 m	—N/a				1:49.42	33
William Dutton	500 m	35.278	18	35.17	11	70.44	14
William Dutton	1000 m	—N/a				1:10.61	26
Mathieu Giroux	1500 m	—N/a				1:47.65	19
Mathieu Giroux	5000 m	—N/a				6:35.77	22
Jamie Gregg	500 m	35.17	13	35.1	8	70.27	11
Gilmore Junio	500 m	35.15	11	35.09	7	70.25	10
Lucas Makowsky	1500 m	—N/a				1:48.51	28
Denny Morrison	1000 m	—N/a				1:08.43	2nd place, silver medalist(s)
Denny Morrison	1500 m	—N/a				1:45.22	3rd place, bronze medalist(s)
Muncef Ouardi	500 m	35.395	23	35.6	29	70.99	25
Muncef Ouardi	1000 m	—N/a				1:11.07	32

Women

Athlete	Event	Race 1		Race 2		Final	
Athlete	Event	Time	Rank	Time	Rank	Time	Rank
Ivanie Blondin	3000 m	—N/a				4:18.69	24
Ivanie Blondin	5000 m	—N/a				7:20.10	14
Anastasia Bucsis	500 m	39.272	27	39.25	28	78.52	28
Kali Christ	1000 m	—N/a				1:17.41	21
Kali Christ	1500 m	—N/a				1:58.63	16
Marsha Hudey	500 m	39.59	32	39.63	33	79.22	32
Kaylin Irvine	1000 m	—N/a				1:17.24	18
Christine Nesbitt	500 m	38.53	11	38.61	12	77.15	12
Christine Nesbitt	1000 m	—N/a				1:15.62	9
Christine Nesbitt	1500 m	—N/a				1:58.67	17
Brittany Schussler	1000 m	—N/a				1:18.53	30
Brittany Schussler	1500 m	—N/a				2:00.65	26
Brittany Schussler	3000 m	—N/a				4:14.65	19
Brianne Tutt	1500 m	—N/a				2:03.69	35
Danielle Wotherspoon-Gregg	500 m	39.76	33	39.56	32	79.32	33

Team pursuit

Athlete	Event	Quarterfinal	Semifinal	Final	
Athlete	Event	Opposition Time	Opposition Time	Opposition Time	Rank
Mathieu Giroux; Lucas Makowsky; Denny Morrison	Men's team pursuit	United States; W 3:43.30	South Korea; L 3:45.28	Final B Poland; L 3:44.27	4
Ivanie Blondin; Kali Christ; Christine Nesbitt; Brittany Schussler	Women's team pursuit	Russia; L 3:02.06	Did not advance	Final C United States; W 3:02.44	5

== See also ==
- Canada at the 2014 Winter Paralympics
- Canada at the 2014 Commonwealth Games
- Canada at the 2014 Summer Youth Olympics
