= Ski jumping at the 2014 Winter Olympics – Men's normal hill individual =

Men's normal hill individual at the XXII Olympic Winter Games
- Venue: RusSki Gorki Jumping Center
- Dates: 8–9 February 2014
- Competitors: 61 from 20 nations
- Winning score: 278.0

Medalists
1st place, gold medalist(s)		Kamil Stoch	Poland
2nd place, silver medalist(s)		Peter Prevc	Slovenia
3rd place, bronze medalist(s)		Anders Bardal	Norway

The men's normal hill individual ski jumping competition for the 2014 Winter Olympics in Sochi, Russia, was held on 8–9 February 2014 at RusSki Gorki Jumping Center in the Esto-Sadok village on the northern slope of Aibga Ridge in Krasnaya Polyana.

== Results ==
=== Qualifying ===
50 ski jumpers qualify for the finals. The top 10 ski jumpers from the World Cup season pre-qualify for the finals. The top 40 ski jumpers from qualifying fill the final 40 spots in the finals.

Rank	Bib	Name	Country	Distance (m)	Distance points	Judges points	Total	Notes
1	43	Michael Hayböck	Austria	101.0	72.0	55.5	128.6	Q
2	37	Andreas Wank	Germany	102.5	75.0	55.5	127.9	Q
3	33	Reruhi Shimizu	Japan	101.5	73.0	54.0	126.2	Q
4	42	Anders Fannemel	Norway	100.0	70.0	55.0	124.6	Q
5	46	Maciej Kot	Poland	98.5	67.0	54.0	123.7	Q
6	7	Roman Koudelka	Czech Republic	99.5	69.0	54.0	121.3	Q
7	50	Taku Takeuchi	Japan	97.5	65.0	52.5	119.1	Q
8	44	Jan Matura	Czech Republic	97.0	64.0	54.0	118.5	Q
9	51	Thomas Morgenstern	Austria	99.5	69.0	52.5	118.3	Q
10	38	Jakub Janda	Czech Republic	98.5	67.0	51.5	117.0	Q
11	10	Sebastian Colloredo	Italy	97.0	64.0	54.0	116.9	Q
12	30	Anders Jacobsen	Norway	95.0	60.0	53.5	115.9	Q
13	32	Dawid Kubacki	Poland	95.5	61.0	53.0	115.7	Q
14	49	Jernej Damjan	Slovenia	93.5	57.0	52.5	115.6	Q
15	39	Rune Velta	Norway	95.5	61.0	54.0	115.1	Q
16	45	Richard Freitag	Germany	94.0	58.0	54.0	114.4	Q
16	15	Kim Hyun-Ki	South Korea	96.0	62.0	54.0	114.4	Q
18	17	Choi Se-Ou	South Korea	96.5	63.0	51.5	113.7	Q
18	16	Ilmir Hazetdinov	Russia	96.0	62.0	52.5	113.7	Q
20	35	Yuta Watase	Japan	95.0	60.0	52.5	113.5	Q
21	31	Mackenzie Boyd-Clowes	Canada	95.0	60.0	52.0	113.4	Q
22	48	Jan Ziobro	Poland	95.0	60.0	52.5	113.2	Q
23	36	Gregor Deschwanden	Switzerland	99.0	68.0	46.5	111.7	Q
24	28	Lukáš Hlava	Czech Republic	92.5	55.0	51.5	108.7	Q
25	27	Denis Kornilov	Russia	92.0	54.0	52.5	109.6	Q
26	13	Anders Johnson	United States	92.5	55.0	51.5	107.9	Q
27	40	Janne Ahonen	Finland	89.0	48.0	51.5	107.8	Q
28	14	Dusty Korek	Canada	92.5	55.0	51.0	107.4	Q
29	34	Mikhail Maksimochkin	Russia	91.0	52.0	51.0	107.2	Q
30	24	Olli Muotka	Finland	91.0	52.0	50.5	107.0	Q
31	47	Jurij Tepeš	Slovenia	89.5	49.0	51.0	106.9	Q
32	21	Kaarel Nurmsalu	Estonia	92.0	54.0	51.0	106.6	Q
33	26	Ronan Lamy Chappuis	France	91.0	52.0	51.0	106.2	Q
34	9	Choi Heung-Chul	South Korea	90.0	50.0	50.0	105.9	Q
35	19	Peter Frenette	United States	93.0	56.0	52.0	105.3	Q
36	29	Jarkko Määttä	Finland	91.5	53.0	51.0	104.6	Q
37	41	Anssi Koivuranta	Finland	89.5	49.0	51.0	104.5	Q
38	25	Davide Bresadola	Italy	90.5	51.0	51.0	104.3	Q
39	22	Alexey Romashov	Russia	90.5	51.0	49.5	102.6	Q
40	1	Nicholas Alexander	United States	90.0	50.0	49.0	100.7	Q
41	5	Matthew Rowley	Canada	90.5	51.0	51.0	100.0	
42	6	Kang Chil-Ku	South Korea	89.0	48.0	49.5	99.3	
43	4	Vladimir Zografski	Bulgaria	89.0	48.0	50.5	97.8	
44	23	Roberto Dellasega	Italy	89.5	49.0	49.0	96.4	
45	3	Sorin Iulian Pitea	Romania	86.0	42.0	49.0	90.2	
46	18	Alexey Pchelintsev	Kazakhstan	85.5	41.0	47.5	89.9	
47	11	Trevor Morrice	Canada	86.0	42.0	49.0	88.7	
48	8	Nico Polychronidis	Greece	83.5	37.0	47.5	85.0	
49	12	Marat Zhaparov	Kazakhstan	83.0	36.0	47.5	84.9	
50	20	Nicholas Fairall	United States	80.5	31.0	44.5	77.3	
51	2	Siim-Tanel Sammelselg	Estonia	73.0	16.0	45.0	66.2	
*	52	Robert Kranjec	Slovenia	100.5	71.0	N/A	N/A	Q
*	53	Thomas Diethart	Austria	99.5	69.0	N/A	N/A	Q
*	54	Andreas Wellinger	Germany	96.5	63.0	N/A	N/A	Q
*	55	Anders Bardal	Norway	98.5	67.0	N/A	N/A	Q
*	56	Simon Ammann	Switzerland	100.0	70.0	N/A	N/A	Q
*	57	Severin Freund	Germany	104.0	78.0	N/A	N/A	Q
*	58	Gregor Schlierenzauer	Austria	104.0	78.0	N/A	N/A	Q
*	59	Noriaki Kasai	Japan	98.5	67.0	N/A	N/A	Q
*	60	Peter Prevc	Slovenia	101.5	73.0	N/A	N/A	Q
*	61	Kamil Stoch	Poland	100.0	70.0	N/A	N/A	Q

1: These skiers are pre-qualified; they perform jumps in the qualification round, but are not ranked with the non-pre-qualified jumpers.

=== Final ===
The final was started at 21:30.

				Round 1			Final round			Total
Rank	Bib	Name	Country	Distance (m)	Points	Rank	Distance (m)	Points	Rank	Points
1st place, gold medalist(s)	50	Kamil Stoch	Poland	105.5	142.0	1	103.5	136.0	1	278.0
2nd place, silver medalist(s)	49	Peter Prevc	Slovenia	102.5	134.8	3	99.0	130.5	3	265.3
3rd place, bronze medalist(s)	44	Anders Bardal	Norway	101.5	135.8	2	98.5	128.3	5	264.1
4	42	Thomas Diethart	Austria	99.0	132.6	5	98.0	125.7	9	258.3
5	32	Michael Hayböck	Austria	101.0	133.4	4	98.5	124.6	11	258.0
6	43	Andreas Wellinger	Germany	96.0	125.8	14	101.5	131.3	2	257.1
7	48	Noriaki Kasai	Japan	101.5	131.2	8	100.0	124.6	11	255.8
7	35	Maciej Kot	Poland	101.5	131.6	7	98.5	124.2	14	255.8
9	38	Jernej Damjan	Slovenia	99.5	128.6	11	101.0	126.1	7	254.7
10	26	Andreas Wank	Germany	101.0	132.6	5	97.0	120.8	19	253.4
11	47	Gregor Schlierenzauer	Austria	96.0	123.9	18	101.0	129.7	4	253.3
12	30	Anssi Koivuranta	Finland	99.5	126.1	13	101.5	126.7	6	252.8
13	37	Jan Ziobro	Poland	101.0	130.6	9	99.0	121.8	17	252.4
14	40	Thomas Morgenstern	Austria	97.5	125.6	15	101.0	126.0	8	251.6
15	31	Anders Fannemel	Norway	98.0	123.7	20	98.5	125.4	10	249.1
16	2	Roman Koudelka	Czech Republic	98.5	122.5	24	99.5	124.3	13	246.8
17	45	Simon Ammann	Switzerland	97.5	125.5	16	98.5	121.1	18	246.6
18	22	Reruhi Shimizu	Japan	99.5	122.2	25	99.5	124.2	14	246.4
19	27	Jakub Janda	Czech Republic	98.5	125.2	17	96.5	118.6	21	243.8
20	34	Richard Freitag	Germany	100.5	121.4	26	97.5	122.3	16	243.7
21	24	Yuta Watase	Japan	99.5	123.0	22	97.0	120.0	20	243.0
22	28	Rune Velta	Norway	97.5	122.8	23	96.5	118.6	21	241.4
23	33	Jan Matura	Czech Republic	96.5	123.9	18	95.5	115.6	25	239.5
24	39	Taku Takeuchi	Japan	98.0	123.1	21	95.5	116.3	24	239.4
25	25	Gregor Deschwanden	Switzerland	100.5	120.7	27	96.5	118.6	21	239.3
26	36	Jurij Tepeš	Slovenia	100.0	127.0	12	93.0	109.7	29	236.7
27	19	Anders Jacobsen	Norway	97.5	119.3	28	93.5	115.0	26	234.3
28	4	Sebastian Colloredo	Italy	97.0	118.9	29	94.0	113.7	27	232.6
29	29	Janne Ahonen	Finland	97.0	118.9	29	92.5	110.3	28	229.2
30	23	Mikhail Maksimochkin	Russia	104.0	129.6	10	90.5	98.3	31	227.9
31	46	Severin Freund	Germany	99.5	108.9	44	93.5	108.8	30	217.7
32	21	Dawid Kubacki	Poland	97.5	118.3	31				
33	18	Jarkko Määttä	Finland	96.5	116.9	32				
34	9	Choi Se-Ou	South Korea	95.0	116.2	33				
35	1	Nicholas Alexander	United States	96.0	116.0	34				
36	8	Ilmir Hazetdinov	Russia	94.0	114.8	35				
37	20	Mackenzie Boyd-Clowes	Canada	96.0	114.4	36				
38	11	Kaarel Nurmsalu	Estonia	95.0	113.3	37				
39	13	Olli Muotka	Finland	92.5	113.0	38				
40	6	Dusty Korek	Canada	93.5	111.1	39				
41	15	Ronan Lamy Chappuis	France	91.0	111.0	40				
42	7	Kim Hyun-Ki	South Korea	92.5	109.2	41				
43	3	Choi Heung-Chul	South Korea	95.0	109.1	42				
44	12	Alexey Romashov	Russia	92.0	109.0	43				
45	10	Peter Frenette	United States	91.5	107.2	45				
46	17	Lukáš Hlava	Czech Republic	91.5	105.7	46				
47	5	Anders Johnson	United States	92.0	104.2	47				
48	16	Denis Kornilov	Russia	89.0	103.2	48				
	14	Davide Bresadola	Italy							DSQ
	41	Robert Kranjec	Slovenia							DNS
