= Ski jumping at the 2015 Winter Universiade – Men's individual normal hill =

The men's individual normal hill competition of the 2015 Winter Universiade was held at the Sporting Centre FIS Štrbské Pleso on January 27.

== Results ==
Rank	Bib	Name	Country	Round 1 Distance (m)	Round 1 Points	Round 1 Rank	Final Round Distance (m)	Final Round Points	Final Round Rank	Total Points
1st place, gold medalist(s)	50	Vladimir Zografski	Bulgaria	95.0	123.1	1	94.0	125.7	2	248.8
2nd place, silver medalist(s)	52	Ilmir Hazetdinov	Russia	90.0	118.3	5	94.5	125.9	1	244.2
3rd place, bronze medalist(s)	14	Evgeni Klimov	Russia	92.5	121.0	3	91.5	120.7	3	241.7
4	51	Mikhail Maksimochkin	Russia	90.5	118.6	4	90.5	116.7	4	235.3
5	53	Junshiro Kobayashi	Japan	89.5	115.4	6	91.0	116.7	4	232.1
6	48	Miran Zupančič	Slovenia	95.5	122.1	2	86.5	108.4	14	230.5
7	47	Stanisław Biela	Poland	91.5	113.7	7	91.0	114.3	6	228.0
8	45	Andrzej Zapotoczny	Poland	89.0	110.6	10	91.0	114.2	7	224.8
9	6	Kanta Takanashi	Japan	91.5	111.8	9	89.0	109.8	11	221.6
10	32	Mitja Mežnar	Slovenia	91.0	112.2	8	89.5	109.1	12	221.3
11	13	Minato Mabuchi	Japan	87.0	109.4	11	88.5	110.5	10	219.9
12	49	Alexey Romashov	Russia	88.5	107.9	12	90.0	111.2	9	219.1
13	38	Ziga Mandl	Slovenia	88.0	107.0	13	88.5	108.1	15	215.1
14	29	Thomas Ortner	Austria	88.5	106.1	14	88.0	107.8	16	213.9
15	46	Jakub Kot	Poland	87.5	104.6	18	88.0	107.5	18	212.1
16	43	Alexander Sardyko	Russia	82.5	99.2	28	92.5	112.8	8	212.0
17	44	Čestmír Kožíšek	Czech Republic	85.0	106.0	15	87.5	105.8	19	211.8
18	36	Thomas Lackner	Austria	85.0	104.0	19	89.0	107.7	17	211.7
19	19	Sabirzhan Muminov	Kazakhstan	86.5	101.2	23	91.0	109.1	12	210.3
20	33	Björn Koch	Austria	86.0	102.8	21	88.0	105.8	19	208.6
20	28	Joakim Larsen Aune	Norway	88.0	105.7	16	86.0	102.9	22	208.6
22	31	Stian Andre Skinnes	Norway	88.5	105.1	17	86.5	101.7	27	206.8
23	9	Jan Mayländer	Germany	88.0	103.5	20	86.5	102.4	24	205.9
24	1	Tobias Simon	Germany	87.0	102.0	22	86.5	102.3	25	204.3
25	20	Ossi-Pekka Valta	Finland	83.5	98.4	29	88.0	104.7	21	203.1
26	37	Ernest Prislic	Slovenia	86.0	101.2	23	86.0	101.8	26	203.0
27	39	Shotaro Hosoda	Japan	84.0	100.2	25	85.0	100.9	28	201.1
28	15	Frans Tähkävuori	Finland	82.0	98.0	30	86.5	102.8	23	200.8
29	30	Florian Menz	Germany	86.0	99.6	26	86.0	100.1	29	199.7
30	40	Roman Sergeevich Trofimov	Russia	83.0	99.6	26	84.0	97.7	30	197.3
31	34	Michael Lunardi	Italy	84.0	97.4	31				97.4
32	7	Riku Tähkävuori	Finland	85.5	96.6	32				96.6
33	35	Lukas Müller	Austria	82.5	96.4	33				96.4
34	41	Grzegorz Miętus	Poland	81.0	96.2	34				96.2
35	22	Vitaliy Kalinichenko	Ukraine	83.5	96.0	35				96.0
36	42	Andrzej Gąsienica	Poland	78.5	87.8	36				87.8
37	2	Alexander Henningsen	Norway	77.5	84.2	37				84.2
38	26	Andriy Klymchuk	Ukraine	80.0	82.8	38				82.8
39	27	Thomas Juffinger	Austria	78.5	81.9	39				81.9
40	12	Aliaksei Muravitski	Belarus	75.0	80.3	40				80.3
41	25	Faik Yüksel	Turkey	77.5	78.9	41				78.9
42	17	Jan Souček	Czech Republic	71.0	74.5	42				74.5
43	21	Vít Háček	Czech Republic	72.0	73.1	43				73.1
44	24	Matej Likar	Slovenia	74.5	71.8	44				71.8
45	5	Shynggys Kalykov	Kazakhstan	72.0	71.7	45				71.7
46	23	Andriy Kalinchuk	Ukraine	73.0	71.1	46				71.1
47	10	Raiko Heide	Estonia	64.0	51.9	47				51.9
48	16	Mojmir Nosal	Slovakia	59.0	47.9	48				47.9
49	3	Li Chao	China	64.5	47.2	49				47.2
50	8	Vatalii Dodyuk	Ukraine	62.0	46.9	50				46.9
51	4	Igor Yakibyuk	Ukraine	60.0	42.8	51				42.8
52	18	Wang Bingrong	China	54.0	38.1	52				38.1
53	11	Mustafa Öztaşyonar	Turkey	54.5	31.0	53				31.0
