= Romashov =

Romashov (Russian: Ромашов) is a Russian masculine surname originating from the given name Roman (and not from the word romashka); its feminine counterpart is Romashova. It may refer to

- Alexey Romashov (born 1992), Russian ski jumper
