= Ilmir Hazetdinov =

Russian ski jumper (born 1991)

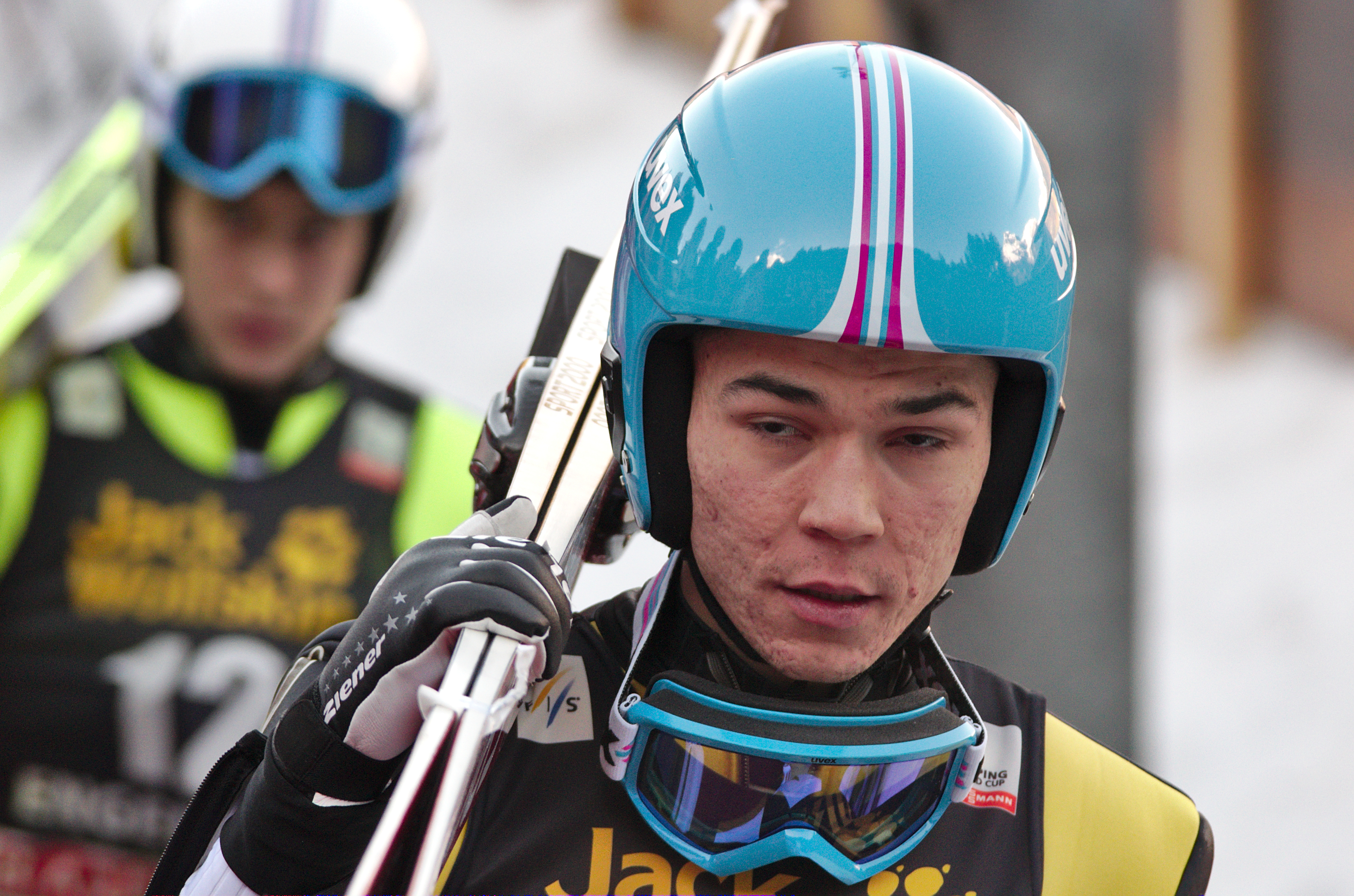

Personal information
- Born: 28 October 1991 (age 35) Ulyanovsk, Russian SSR, Soviet Union

Sport
- Sport: Skiing
Medal record
Men's ski jumping
Representing Russia
Winter Universiade
| Gold medal – first place | 2015 Osrblie | Team NH |
| Silver medal – second place | 2015 Osrblie | Individual NH |

Ilmir Hazetdinov (Tatar: Илмир Ришат улы Хәзетдинов, Russian: Ильмир Ришатович Хазетдинов; born 28 October 1991 in Ulyanovsk) is a Russian ski jumper. He is of Tatar descent.

Hazetdinov competed at the 2014 Winter Olympics for Russia. He placed 18th in the normal hill qualifying round, and 35th in the first jump of the final round, failing to advance. He placed 32nd in the large hill qualifying round, and 29th in the final. He was also a member of the Russian team that placed 9th in the team event.

Hazetdinov made his World Cup debut in March 2012. As of September 2014, his best finish is 7th, in a team event at Lahti in 2011–12. His best individual finish is 31st, at a large hill event at Engelberg in 2013–14.
