= Jarkko Määttä =

Finnish ski jumper (born 1994)

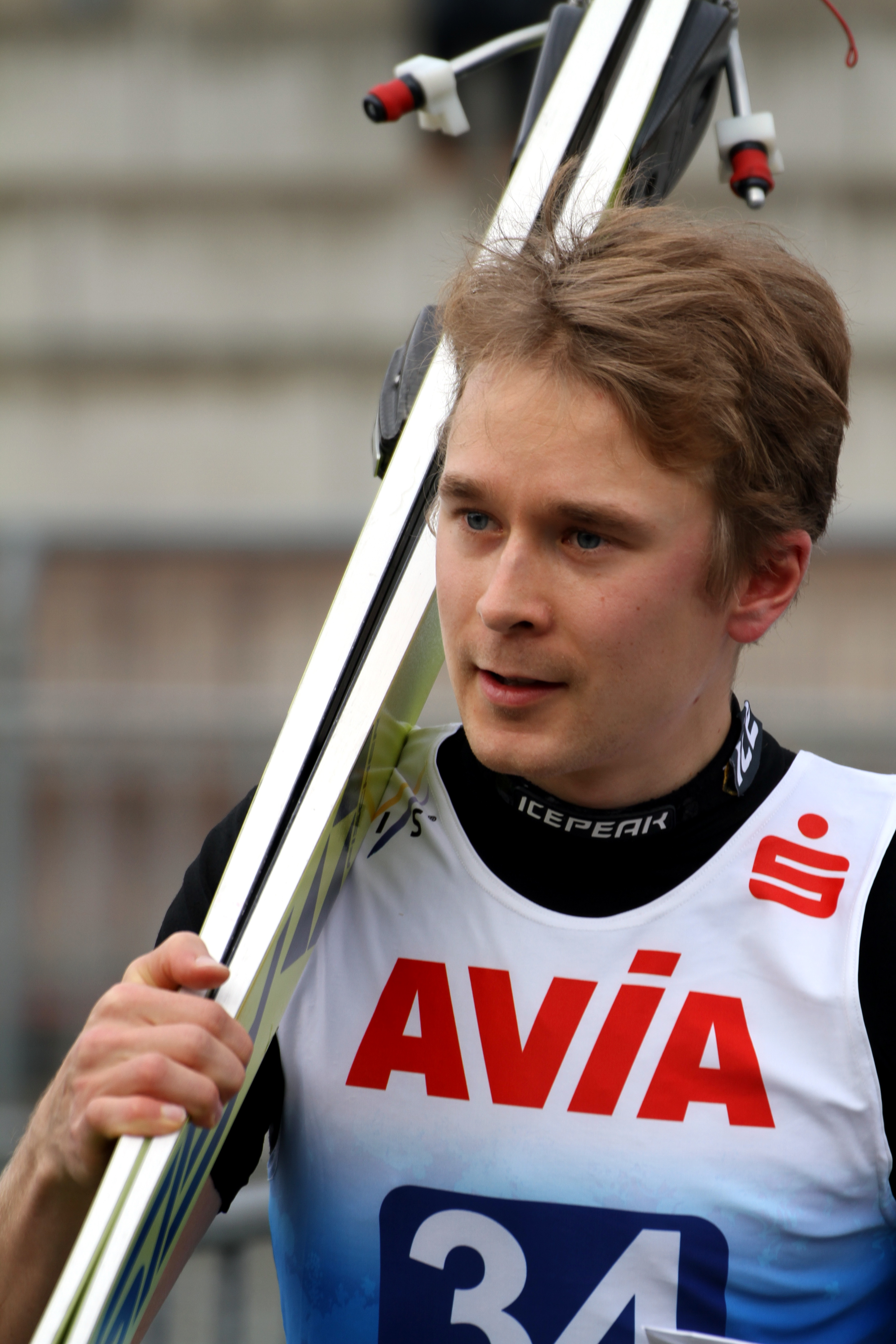
- Määttä in Klingenthal in 2017

Personal information
- Nationality: Finland
- Born: 28 December 1994 (age 31) Iisalmi, Finland
- Height: 1.69 m (5 ft 7 in)

Sport
- Sport: Skiing
- Club: Kainuun Hiihtoseura

World Cup career
- Seasons: 2010–present

Achievements and titles
- Personal bests: 213 m (699 ft); Planica, 22 March 2015
- Updated on 13 May 2015

Jarkko Määttä (born 28 December 1994) is a Finnish ski jumper.

Määttä competed at the 2014 Winter Olympics for Finland. He placed 36th in the normal hill qualifying round and 32nd in the first jump of the final round, but did not advance. He then placed 33rd in the large hill qualifying round and 43rd on the first jump of the final, also failing to advance. He was also a member of the Finnish team that placed eighth in the team event.

Määttä made his World Cup debut in November 2010. His current best World Cup finish is fourth, in a team event at Klingenthal on 22 November 2014; his best individual World Cup finish is ninth, in a large hill event at Lahti in the same season. His best overall World Cup finish is 32nd, in 2014–15.
