= Alexey Pchelintsev =

Kazakhstani ski jumper (born 1991)

Personal information
- Born: April 18, 1991 (age 35) Almaty, Kazakh SSR, Soviet Union

Sport
- Sport: Skiing

Alexey Pchelintsev (born April 18, 1991 in Almaty) is a Kazakhstani ski jumper who placed 46th in the normal hill qualifying round and the large hill qualifying round of the 2014 Winter Olympics, failing to advance.

Pchelintsev made his World Cup debut in January 2012. His best team finish is 10th, at Zakopane in 2014. His best individual finish is 53rd, at a ski flying event at Tauplitz in 2012.
