= Heidi Widmer =

Canadian cross-country skier (born 1991)

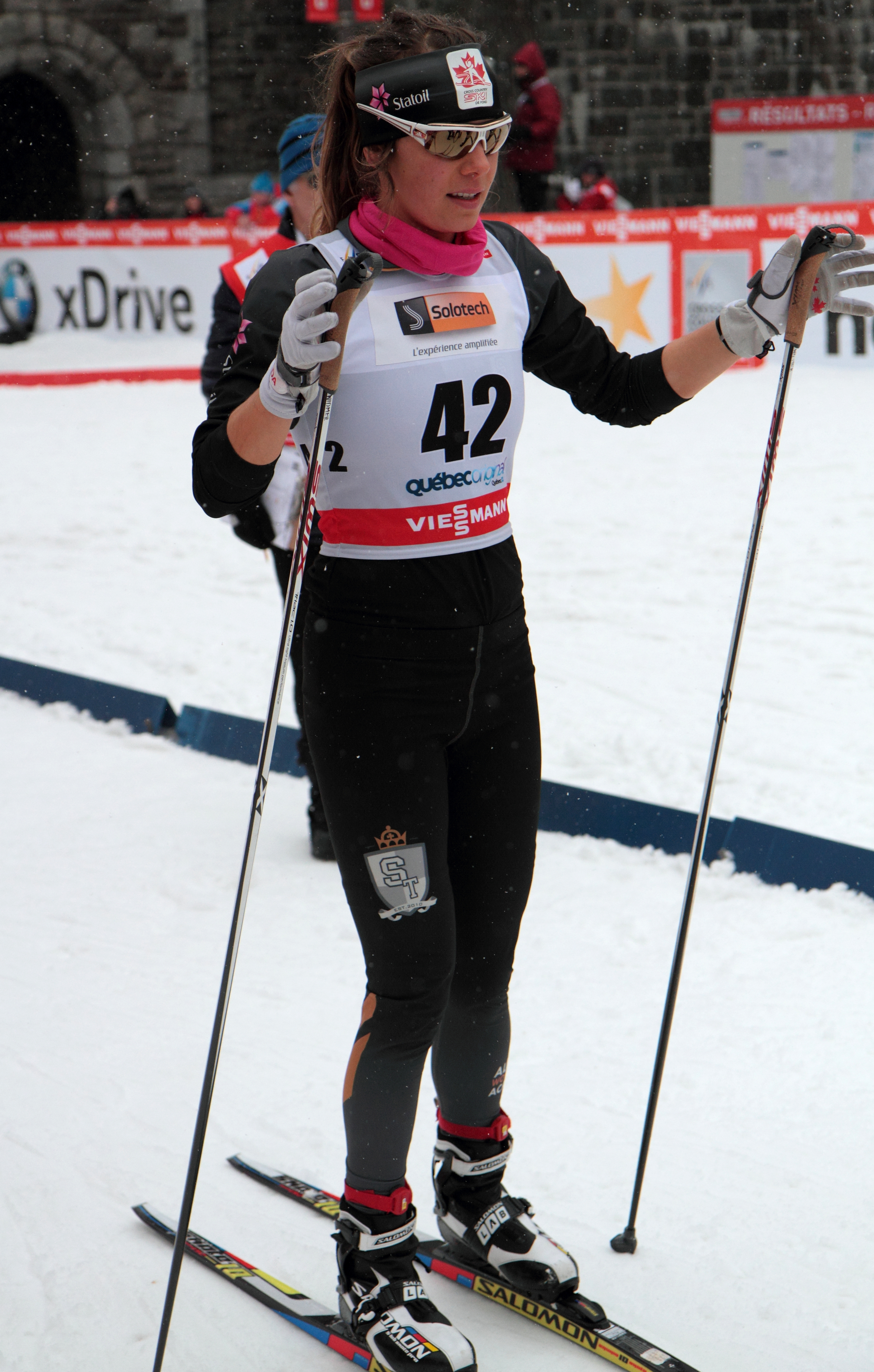

Personal information
- Nationality: Canada; Switzerland
- Born: February 28, 1991 (age 35) Banff, Alberta, Canada

Sport
- Sport: Skiing
- Club: SAS Bern

World Cup career
- Seasons: 9 – (2008–2009, 2011, 2013–2018)
- Indiv. starts: 21
- Indiv. podiums: 0
- Team starts: 4
- Team podiums: 0
- Overall titles: 0 – (99th in 2016)
- Discipline titles: 0

Heidi Widmer (born February 28, 1991, in Banff, Alberta) is a Canadian Olympic cross-country skier. In 2015, Widmer moved to Davos, Switzerland to race and train with the Swiss national team. Philip Widmer is the older brother of Heidi Widmer.

== Cross-country skiing results ==
All results are sourced from the International Ski Federation (FIS).

=== Olympic Games ===
Year	Age	10 km individual	15 km skiathlon	30 km mass start	Sprint	4 × 5 km relay	Team sprint
2014	23	55	—	50	42	—	—

=== World Cup ===
==== Season standings ====
Season	Age	Discipline standings			Ski Tour standings			
Season	Age	Overall	Distance	Sprint	Nordic Opening	Tour de Ski	World Cup Final	Ski Tour Canada
2008	17	NC	—	NC	—N/a	—	—	—N/a
2009	18	NC	—	NC	—N/a	—	—	—N/a
2011	20	NC	—	NC	—	—	—	—N/a
2013	22	NC	NC	NC	—	—	—	—N/a
2014	23	NC	NC	NC	—	—	—	—N/a
2015	24	NC	—	NC	—	—	—N/a	—N/a
2016	25	99	NC	65	—	DNF	—N/a	—
2017	26	NC	—	NC	—	DNF	—	—N/a
2018	27	NC	—	NC	—	—	—	—N/a
