= Marinus Kraus =

German ski jumper

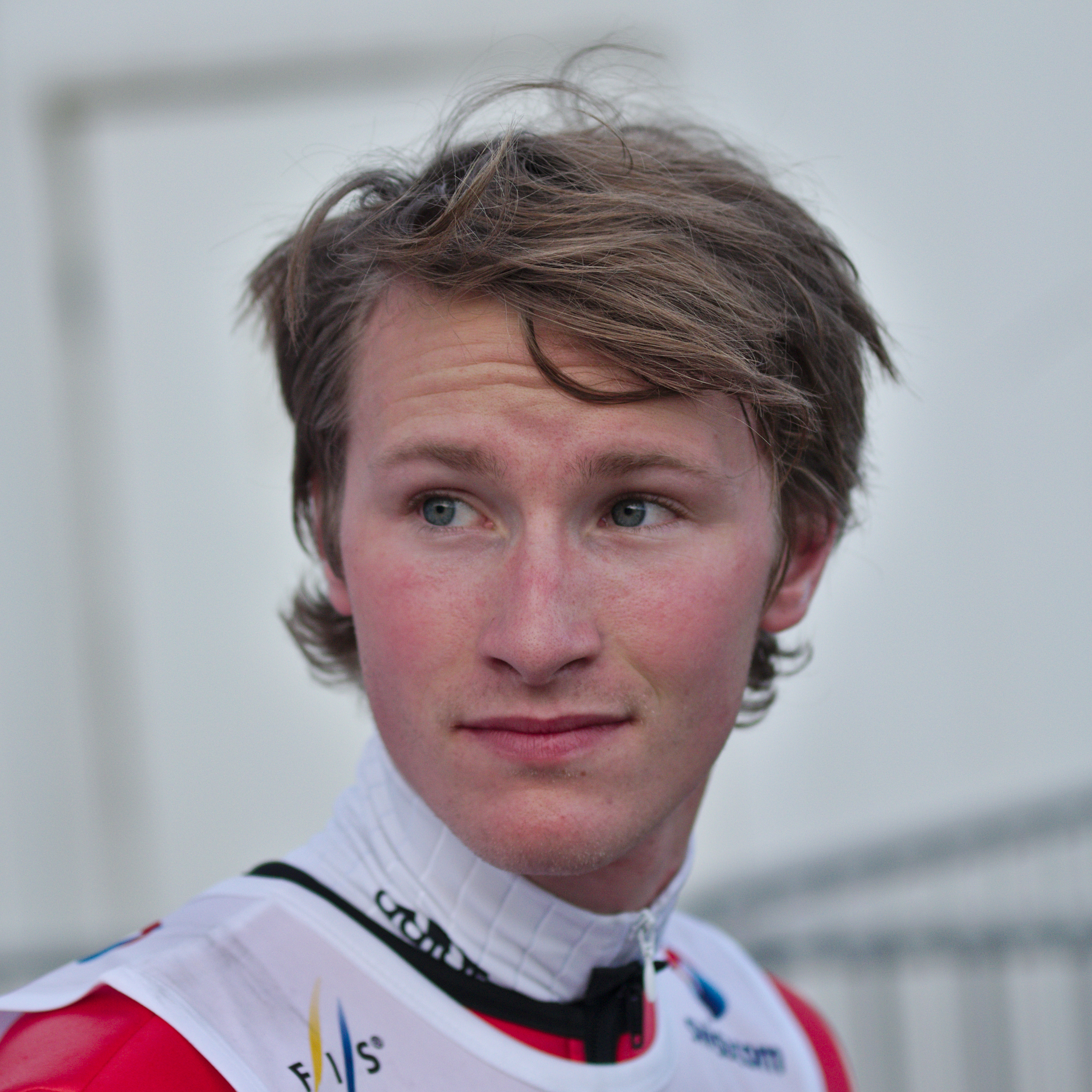

Personal information
- Full name: Marinus Kraus
- Nationality: Germany
- Born: 13 February 1991 (age 35) Oberaudorf, Germany

Sport
- Sport: Skiing
- Club: WSV Oberaudorf

World Cup career
- Seasons: 2010–2022
- Indiv. starts: 60
- Indiv. podiums: 1

Achievements and titles
- Personal bests: 222 m (728 ft); Vikersund, 15 February 2015
Medal record
Representing Germany
Men's ski jumping
Olympic Games
Gold medal – first place	2014 Sochi	Team LH
- Updated on 12 February 2017

Marinus Kraus (born 13 February 1991) is a German ski jumper.

Kraus's debut in FIS Ski Jumping World Cup took place in January 2013 in Vikersund. His best result in World Cup is a second place in Kuusamo in November 2013.
