= Ariane Lavigne =

Canadian snowboarder (born 1984)

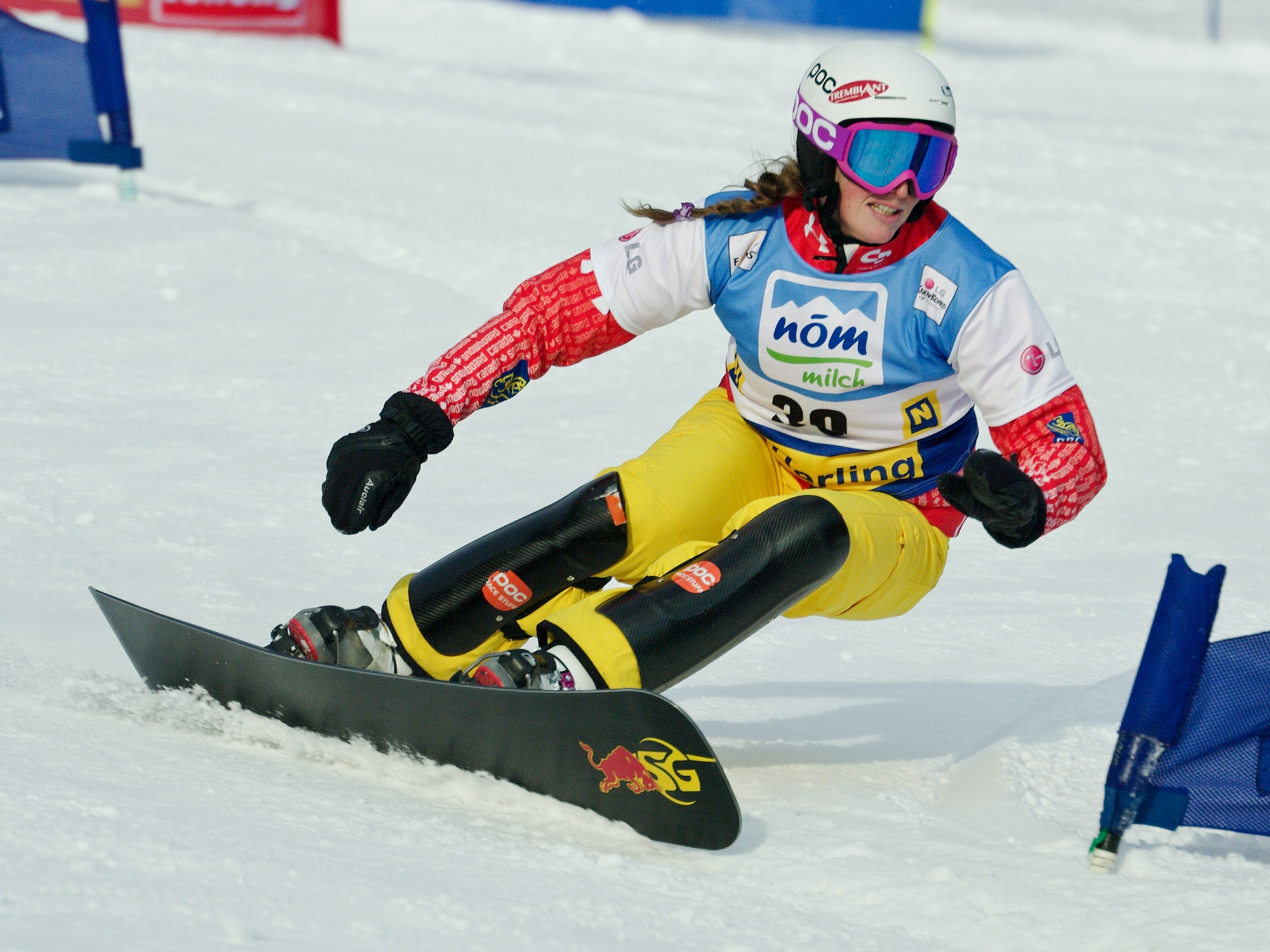

Personal information
- Born: 8 October 1984 (age 41) Sainte-Agathe-des-Monts, Quebec, Canada
- Height: 1.70 m (5 ft 7 in)
- Weight: 62 kg (137 lb)

Sport
- Country: Canada
- Sport: Snowboarding
- Event(s): Parallel slalom Parallel giant slalom

Ariane Lavigne (born 8 October 1984) is a Canadian snowboarder. She competed in the slalom events at the 2014 Winter Olympics for Canada.
