= Morgan Pridy =

Canadian alpine skier

Personal information
- Born: September 10, 1990 (age 35) Vancouver, British Columbia, Canada
- Height: 1.73 m (5 ft 8 in)

Skiing career
- Sport: Alpine skiing
- Disciplines: Super-G, combined.

Morgan Pridy (born October 9, 1990 in Vancouver, British Columbia) is a Canadian specializing in Super-G and alpine skiing combined. He represented Canada in these event sat the 2014 Winter Olympics. Pridy currently resides in Whistler, British Columbia and is the Men's Head Coach for the BC Ski Team.
