= Nicholas Fairall =

American ski jumper

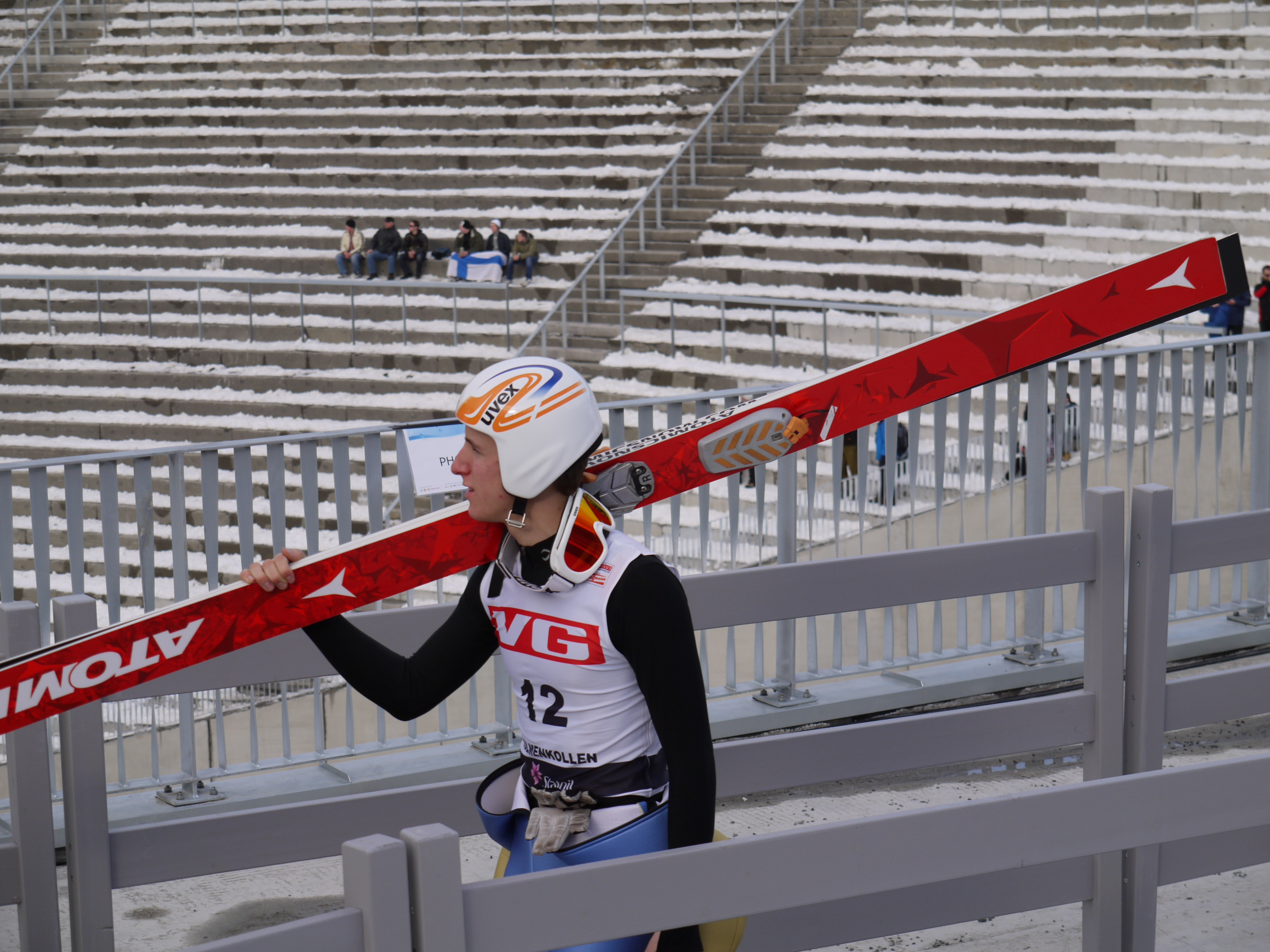
- Fairall in Oslo, 2010

Personal information
- Nationality: United States
- Born: June 6, 1989 (age 37) New London, New Hampshire, U.S.

Sport
- Sport: Skiing
- Club: Andover Outing Club

World Cup career
- Seasons: 2009; 2013–2015

Nicholas Fairall (born July 6, 1989) is an American former ski jumper who competed for the United States in the men's normal hill individual competition at the 2014 Winter Olympics. He is a graduate of Proctor Academy in Andover, New Hampshire.

On January 5, 2015, Fairall suffered serious spinal injuries in Bischofshofen, during qualification for the final event of the 2014–15 Four Hills Tournament. After landing a seemingly routine jump of 123 meters, he lost balance and suddenly fell violently forward head-first and flipped over. A year later, Fairall returned to Bischofshofen and gave an interview in which he discussed the progress of his recovery and continued love for ski jumping. Despite using a wheelchair, Fairall was present at the event as a keen spectator.
