= Alexey Romashov =

Russian ski jumper (born 1992)

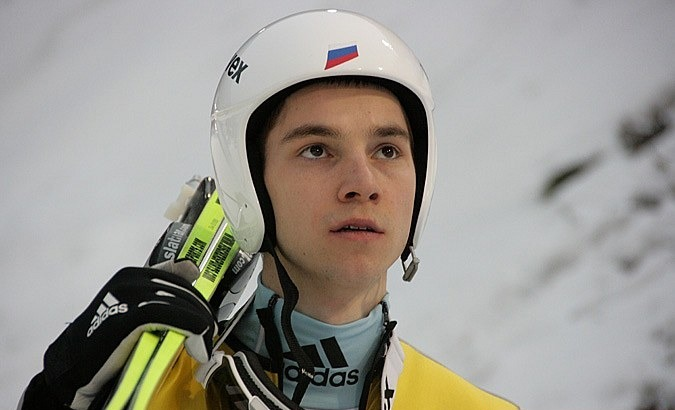
- Alexey Romashov at the World Championships 2013

Personal information
- Full name: Alexey Gennadyevich Romashov
- Nationality: Russian
- Born: 29 April 1992 (age 34) Saint Petersburg, Russia

Sport
- Sport: Skiing

Alexey Gennadyevich Romashov (Russian: Алексей Геннадьевич Ромашов; born 29 April 1992) is a Russian ski jumper.

== Career ==
Romashov competed at the 2014 Winter Olympics for Russia. He placed 39th in the normal hill qualifying round, and 43rd in the first jump of the final round, failing to advance. He placed 34th in the large hill qualifying round, and 46th in the first jump of the final round, failing to advance. He was also a member of the Russian team that placed 9th in the team event.

As of September 2014, his best showing at the World Championships is 9th, in the 2013 team event. His best individual finish is 34th, in the 2013 normal hill event.

Romashov made his World Cup debut in November 2012. As of September 2014, his best finish is 6th, in pair of team events in 2012–13. His best individual finish is 22nd, at a large hill event at Kuusamo in 2013–14. His best World Cup overall finish is 61st, in 2012–13.
