= Reruhi Shimizu =

Japanese ski jumper

Medal record

Men's ski jumping

Representing Japan

Olympic Games
Bronze medal – third place	2014 Sochi	Team large hill

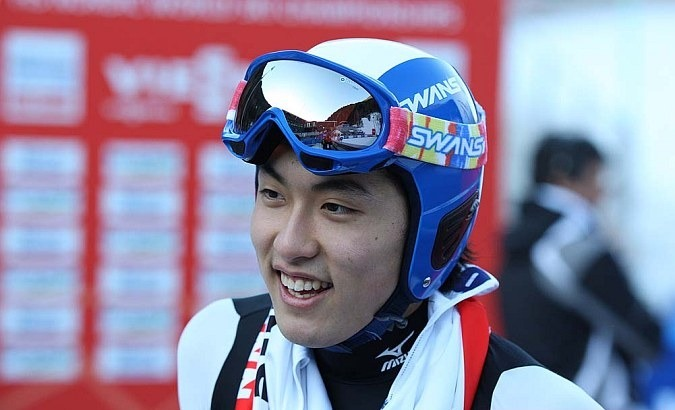

Reruhi Shimizu (清水 礼留飛, Shimizu Reruhi; born 4 December 1993) is a Japanese ski jumper from Myōkō, Niigata.

Shimizu's debut in FIS Ski Jumping World Cup took place in November 2012 in Lillehammer. On 23 November 2013, he won bronze at a team event with Japan in Klingenthal at large hill.

His first name, Reruhi, refers to Austrian military officer Theodor Edler von Lerch, who introduced skiing to Japan in 1911.
