= Dusty Korek =

Canadian ski jumper

Dusty Korek (born April 19, 1995, in Edmonton, Alberta) is a Canadian ski jumper of Polish descent. He competed for Canada at the 2014 Winter Olympics in Men's normal hill individual.
