= Olli Muotka =

Finnish Nordic combined skier and ski jumper

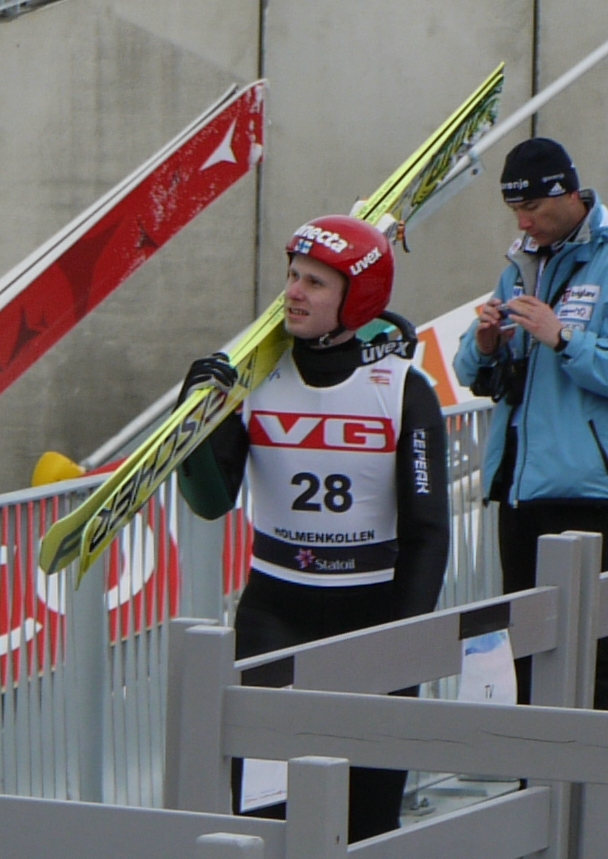

Personal information
- Born: 14 July 1988 (age 38) Rovaniemi, Finland
- Height: 179 cm (5 ft 10 in)
- Weight: 61 kg (134 lb)
Medal record
Men's ski flying
Representing Finland
World Championships
Bronze medal – third place	2010 Planica	Team

Olli Muotka (born 14 July 1988, in Rovaniemi) is a Finnish ski jumper and former Nordic combined athlete.

Before 2007 Muotka competed mainly in Nordic combined, in the Junior World Ski Championships and World Cup B competitions.

Since 2007 Muotka started to concentrate on ski jumping. In 2007 Junior World Ski Championships he finished eighth in the normal hill and won a bronze medal in the team competition. He made his Continental Cup debut in December 2007, his best result being a twelfth place from Zakopane in February 2008. He made his World Cup debut in January 2010 in Sapporo, collecting his first World Cup points with a fourteenth place.

Muotka earned a bronze in the team event at the FIS Ski-Flying World Championships 2010 in Planica.
