= Matthew Rowley =

Canadian ski jumper

Matthew Rowley (born June 4, 1993 in Red Deer, Alberta) is a retired Canadian Olympic ski jumper. Rowley retired after being disqualified in the 2014 Olympics in Sochi.

== Olympic career ==
In 2014, Rowley competed in the Winter Olympics that took place in Sochi, Russia. He was disqualified due to a suit violation.
