= Trevor Morrice =

Canadian ski jumper

Trevor Morrice (born September 23, 1991, Calgary) is a Canadian ski jumper who has competed since 2006. At the 2010 Winter Olympics, he finished 12th in the team large hill, 51st in the individual normal hill, at Sochi 2014 Winter Olympics, he qualified for the Large hill competition and finished 42nd.

Morrice's best career International finish was Silver in an FIS Cup HS77 event at Switzerland in 2006. Trevor began coaching in 2010 and after an almost 3 and a 1/2 years away from active competition Trevor came out of retirement. He placed 11th in a Continental Cup competition in Sapporo, Japan which helped him qualify for the 2014 Canadian Olympic Ski Jumping team. In 2015 Trevor competed in Vikersund, Norway where he jumped 154 meters his Longest competitive jump, finishing 34th in the qualification round he needed top 30 to qualify for the next competitive round.

Trevor parents are Brent and Terri and he also has a brother, Brendon.
