= Biathlon at the 2014 Winter Olympics – Women's relay =

Women's relay at the XXII Olympic Winter Games
- Pictogram for biathlon
- Venue: Laura Biathlon & Ski Complex
- Date: 21 February 2014
- Competitors: 68 from 17 nations
- Winning time: 1:10:02.5

Medalists
1st place, gold medalist(s)		Vita Semerenko; Juliya Dzhyma; Valentyna Semerenko; Olena Pidhrushna	Ukraine
2nd place, silver medalist(s)		Fanny Welle-Strand Horn; Tiril Eckhoff; Ann Kristin Aafedt Flatland; Tora Berger	Norway
3rd place, bronze medalist(s)		Eva Puskarčíková; Gabriela Soukalová; Jitka Landová; Veronika Vítková	Czech Republic

The Women's 4 × 6 kilometre relay biathlon competition of the Sochi 2014 Olympics was held at Laura Biathlon & Ski Complex on 21 February 2014.

== Summary ==
Ukraine won their first ever gold Olympic medal in biathlon (and the second gold winter Olympic medal, the first one since 1994 (won by Oksana Baiul), ahead of Russia, the defending champion, and Norway. It also became the fourth nation — after France, Russia, and Germany — to ever win the Olympic gold medal in women's biathlon relay.

For the first time Germany failed to reach the podium in Olympic women's relay. Franziska Preuß, who was running the first leg, fell and broke a pole. After that, Germany was never in the medal contention. Marie-Laure Brunet, running the first leg for France, collapsed, so France did not finish.

On 27 November 2017, the IOC disqualified Olga Vilukhina and Yana Romanova for doping violations and stripped Russia of the silver medal. Fellow teammate Olga Zaitseva was sanctioned on 1 December 2017. On 24 September 2020, the Court of Arbitration for Sport removed the sanctions from biathletes Olga Vilukhina and Yana Romanova, but upheld them on their teammate Olga Zaitseva. Medals in this event were redistributed by the IOC on 19 May 2022. The Czech team was awarded the medals on 4 March 2023 during the Biathlon World Cup in Nové Město na Moravě.

== Results ==
The race was started at 18:30.

Rank	Bib	Country	Time	Penalties (P+S)	Deficit
1st place, gold medalist(s)	2	Ukraine Vita Semerenko; Juliya Dzhyma; Valentyna Semerenko; Olena Pidhrushna	1:10:02.5; 16:56.4; 17:16.3; 17:40.9; 18:08.9	0+1 0+4; 0+0 0+1; 0+0 0+0; 0+0 0+3; 0+1 0+0	—
2nd place, silver medalist(s)	4	Norway Fanny Welle-Strand Horn; Tiril Eckhoff; Ann Kristin Aafedt Flatland; Tora Berger	1:10:40.1; 17:40.5; 16:57.9; 17:43.6; 18:18.1	0+1 0+4; 0+1 0+2; 0+0 0+1; 0+0 0+0; 0+0 0+1	+37.6
3rd place, bronze medalist(s)	10	Czech Republic Eva Puskarčíková; Gabriela Soukalová; Jitka Landová; Veronika Vítková	1:11:25.7; 17:54.2; 16:30.6; 18:42.4; 18:18.5	0+7 0+7; 0+2 0+2; 0+0 0+2; 0+3 0+2; 0+2 0+1	+1:23.2
4	6	Belarus Liudmila Kalinchik; Nadezhda Skardino; Nadzeya Pisarava; Darya Domracheva	1:11:33.4; 18:39.0; 17:38.3; 18:02.1; 17:14.0	0+4 1+4; 0+2 1+3; 0+0 0+1; 0+2 0+0; 0+0 0+0	+1:30.9
5	8	Italy Dorothea Wierer; Nicole Gontier; Michela Ponza; Karin Oberhofer	1:11:43.3; 16:49.7; 18:46.0; 18:06.5; 18:01.1	1+5 0+4; 0+2 0+1; 1+3 0+3; 0+0 0+0; 0+0 0+0	+1:40.8
6	14	United States Susan Dunklee; Hannah Dreissigacker; Sara Studebaker; Annelies Cook	1:12:14.2; 17:02.6; 18:08.3; 17:55.6; 19:07.7	0+7 0+6; 0+2 0+1; 0+3 0+3; 0+0 0+0; 0+2 0+2	+2:11.7
7	7	Canada Rosanna Crawford; Megan Imrie; Megan Heinicke; Zina Kocher	1:12:21.5; 17:20.7; 17:41.7; 17:38.1; 19:41.0	0+6 2+6; 0+2 0+1; 0+2 0+2; 0+0 0+0; 0+2 2+3	+2:19.0
8	12	Switzerland Selina Gasparin; Elisa Gasparin; Aita Gasparin; Irene Cadurisch	1:12:34.3; 17:17.6; 17:55.8; 17:56.1; 19:24.8	0+6 0+3; 0+3 0+1; 0+0 0+1; 0+0 0+1; 0+3 0+0	+2:31.8
9	11	Poland Krystyna Pałka; Magdalena Gwizdoń; Weronika Nowakowska-Ziemniak; Monika Hojnisz	1:12:34.4; 19:39.0; 17:06.8; 17:21.7; 18:26.9	4+5 0+3; 4+3 0+1; 0+0 0+1; 0+2 0+0; 0+0 0+1	+2:31.9
10	1	Germany Franziska Preuß; Andrea Henkel; Franziska Hildebrand; Laura Dahlmeier	1:13:44.2; 19:46.7; 17:25.1; 17:59.4; 18:33.0	0+5 0+1; 0+3 0+1; 0+1 0+0; 0+1 0+0; 0+0 0+0	+3:41.7
11	13	Kazakhstan Galina Vishnevskaya; Elena Khrustaleva; Darya Usanova; Marina Lebedeva	1:15:54.7; 17:36.6; 18:35.5; 18:17.4; 21:25.2	0+5 0+8; 0+0 0+2; 0+2 0+2; 0+0 0+2; 0+3 0+2	+5:52.2
12	17	Japan Fuyuko Suzuki; Yuki Nakajima; Miki Kobayashi; Rina Suzuki	LAP; 17:33.2; 18:47.0; 19:23.3; LAP	0+6 0+5; 0+0 0+1; 0+2 0+2; 0+1 0+1; 0+3 0+1	
13	9	Slovakia Jana Gereková; Paulína Fialková; Terézia Poliaková; Martina Chrapánová	LAP; 17:51.3; 18:57.7; 19:48.0; LAP	4+11 1+8; 0+2 1+3; 1+3 0+2; 3+3 0+0; 0+3 0+3	
14	16	China Song Chaoqing; Zhang Yan; Tang Jialin; Song Na	LAP; 18:40.2; 18:41.1; 18:40.0; LAP	0+6 0+5; 0+1 0+2; 0+2 0+0; 0+0 0+1; 0+3 0+2	
15	15	Estonia Kadri Lehtla; Grete Gaim; Daria Yurlova; Johanna Talihärm	LAP; 18:03.8; 19:14.8; 19:58.1; LAP	0+5 1+8; 0+2 0+1; 0+1 0+1; 0+2 1+3; 0+0 0+3	
	5	France Marie-Laure Brunet; Marie Dorin Habert; Anaïs Chevalier; Anaïs Bescond			DNF
DSQ (2)	3	Russia Yana Romanova; Olga Zaitseva; Ekaterina Shumilova; Olga Vilukhina	1:10:28.9; 16:56.3; 17:43.2; 17:43.3; 18:06.1	0+1 0+3; 0+0 0+1; 0+1 0+1; 0+0 0+0; 0+0 0+1	+26.4
