= Biathlon at the 2014 Winter Olympics – Qualification =

The following is about the qualification rules and the quota allocation for the biathlon at the 2014 Winter Olympics.

== Quota allocation ==
A total quota of 220 athletes are allowed at the Games (113 men and 107 women). Countries are assigned quotas using a combination of the Nation Cup scores of their top 3 athletes in the individual, sprint, and relay competitions at the 2012 in Ruhpolding, Germany and 2013 World Championships in Nové Město na Moravě, Czech Republic.

An athlete also must meet requirements before competing: During the 2012/13 or 2013/14 Biathlon World Cup season the athlete must have two results at IBU Cup, Open European Championships, World Championships or World Cup in the Sprint or Individual that at a maximum is 20% behind the average time of the top three athletes. Or, two placings in the top half at the Junior World Championships. They also can have a combination of both criteria (one of each). All relay members must meet this requirement as well.

If a nation rejects a quota spot, it will go to nations 28 (for women) and 29 (for men) and so on until all quotas have been distributed. A country qualifying more the four athletes must lower their teams to three or less athletes to have redistribution had effect, considering countries that reject a quota spot from five to four athletes can still start the maximum of four athletes in any event (with 88 for men and 87 for women being the maximum number of starters an event can have).

== Qualification table by country ==
Nations	Men's	Women's	Total
Andorra	–	1	1
Australia	1	1	2
Austria	6	3	9^{5}
Belarus	5	5	10
Bosnia and Herzegovina	–	1	1
Brazil	–	1	1
Bulgaria	5	1	6
Canada	4	4	8^{1}
China	1	4	5
Czech Republic	5	5	10
Estonia	5	4	9
Finland	2	2	4^{2}
France	6	6	12
Germany	6	6	12
Great Britain	1	1	2
Greece	–	1	1
Hungary	–	1	1
Italy	5	5	10
Japan	1	4	5
Kazakhstan	5	5	10
Latvia	1	1	2
Lithuania	1	1	2
Moldova	–	1	1
Norway	6	6	12
Poland	5	5	10
Romania	1	1	2
Russia	6	6	12
Serbia	1	–	1
Slovakia	4	4	8^{3}
Slovenia	5	1	6
South Korea	1	1	2
Spain	1	1	2
Sweden	5	–	5^{4}
Switzerland	5	4	9
Ukraine	5	6	11
United States	5	5	10
Total: 36 NOCs	111	105	216

1. Canada qualified five athletes per gender, but elected to only send four.
2. Finland qualified five athletes per gender, but elected to only send two.
3. Slovakia qualified five athletes per gender, but elected to only send four.
4. Sweden qualified five female athletes, but elected to send none.
5. Austria qualified four women but decided to send only three.

== Qualification standings ==
Below are the final official standings. Countries not qualified can still qualify pending reallocation.

Qualified through World Championships
Qualified through reallocation

Men

Ranking	NOC	2012 points	2013 points	Total	Athletes
1	France	1204	1229	2433	6
2	Norway	1177	1223	2400	6
3	Germany	1131	1086	2217	6
4	Russia	1011	1065	2076	6
5	Austria	1038	997	2035	6
6	Czech Republic	982	983	1965	5
7	Italy	1004	940	1944	5
8	Sweden	894	953	1847	5
9	United States	848	904	1752	5
10	Slovenia	916	826	1742	5
11	Ukraine	898	816	1714	5
12	Switzerland	884	753	1637	5
13	Canada	752	882	1634	~~5~~ 4
14	Bulgaria	776	757	1533	5
15	Slovakia	752	780	1532	~~5~~ 4
16	Belarus	796	717	1513	5
17	Estonia	666	664	1330	5
18	Kazakhstan	670	595	1265	5
19	Poland	570	467	1037	5
20	Finland	508	524	1032	~~5~~ 2
21	Latvia	524	486	1010	1
22	Japan	598	366	964	1
23	Lithuania	395	522	917	1
24	China	369	529	898	1
25	Romania	164	577	741	1
26	Great Britain	289	370	659	1
27	Serbia	292	357	649	1
28	South Korea	271	329	600	1
29	Spain	258	219	477	1
30	~~Belgium~~	241	141	382	~~1~~ 0
31	Australia	134	155	289	1
32	Hungary	134	115	249	1
33	Turkey	136	100	236	
34	Netherlands	66	154	220	
35	Macedonia	77	97	174	
36	Croatia	87	82	169	
37	Bosnia and Herzegovina	73	69	142	
38	Moldova	40	62	102	
39	Denmark*	76	16	92	
40	Greece	36	20	56	
41	Uzbekistan	32	–	32	
Total					

Women

Ranking	NOC	2012 points	2013 points	Total	Athletes
1	Norway	1104	1175	2279	6
2	Ukraine	1013	1235	2248	6
3	Russia	1073	1174	2247	6
4	Germany	1155	1057	2212	6
5	France	1195	1009	2204	6
6	Belarus	1042	930	1972	5
7	Poland	928	972	1900	5
8	Slovakia	902	906	1808	5
9	Italy	796	991	1787	5
10	~~Sweden~~	994	726	1740	~~5~~ 0
11	Czech Republic	749	929	1678	5
12	United States	814	817	1631	5
13	Canada	812	722	1534	~~5~~ 4
14	Kazakhstan	702	649	1351	5
15	Finland	705	630	1335	~~5~~ 2
16	Switzerland	572	753	1325	4
17	Austria	679	636	1315	~~4~~ 3
18	Estonia	739	560	1299	4
19	Japan	699	535	1234	4
20	China	421	750	1171	4
21	Slovenia	518	652	1170	1
22	Bulgaria	595	568	1163	1
23	Romania	553	514	1067	1
24	Lithuania	484	408	892	1
25	Great Britain	450	318	768	1
26	South Korea	356	371	727	1
27	Latvia	343	233	576	1
28	Andorra	182	174	356	1
29	Spain	114	165	279	1
30	~~New Zealand~~	119	100	219	~~1~~ 0
30	Hungary	111	108	219	1
32	Brazil	86	72	158	1
33	Moldova	79	61	140	1
34	Australia	62	66	128	1
35	Bosnia and Herzegovina	64	52	116	1
36	~~Turkey~~	52	56	108	
37	Greece	26	68	94	1
38	Netherlands	77	0	77	
39	Denmark*	65	–	65	
Total					

- Denmark's points consists of athletes from Greenland, an autonomous country within the Kingdom of Denmark.
