= Biathlon at the 2014 Winter Olympics – Mixed relay =

Mixed relay at the XXII Olympic Winter Games
- Pictogram for biathlon
- Venue: Laura Biathlon & Ski Complex
- Date: 19 February 2014
- Competitors: 64 from 16 nations
- Winning time: 1:09:17.0

Medalists
1st place, gold medalist(s)		Tora Berger; Tiril Eckhoff; Ole Einar Bjørndalen; Emil Hegle Svendsen	Norway
2nd place, silver medalist(s)		Veronika Vítková; Gabriela Soukalová; Jaroslav Soukup; Ondřej Moravec	Czech Republic
3rd place, bronze medalist(s)		Dorothea Wierer; Karin Oberhofer; Dominik Windisch; Lukas Hofer	Italy

The mixed relay competition of the Sochi 2014 Olympics was held at Laura Biathlon & Ski Complex on 19 February 2014.

== Results ==
The race was started at 18:30.

Rank	Bib	Country	Time	Penalties (P+S)	Deficit
1st place, gold medalist(s)	2	Norway Tora Berger; Tiril Eckhoff; Ole Einar Bjørndalen; Emil Hegle Svendsen	1:09:17.0; 15:55.6; 16:11.9; 17:50.9; 19:16.6	0+0 0+2; 0+0 0+2; 0+0 0+0; 0+0 0+0; 0+0 0+0	—
2nd place, silver medalist(s)	1	Czech Republic Veronika Vítková; Gabriela Koukalová; Jaroslav Soukup; Ondřej Moravec	1:09:49.6; 16:01.9; 16:05.5; 18:33.1; 19:08.1	0+4 0+3; 0+0 0+1; 0+3 0+0; 0+1 0+1; 0+0 0+1	+32.6
3rd place, bronze medalist(s)	4	Italy Dorothea Wierer; Karin Oberhofer; Dominik Windisch; Lukas Hofer	1:10:15.2; 15:57.9; 16:28.0; 18:46.6; 19:02.7	0+1 0+5; 0+0 0+1; 0+0 0+1; 0+1 0+3; 0+0 0+0	+58.2
4	12	Slovakia Jana Gereková; Anastasiya Kuzmina; Pavol Hurajt; Matej Kazár	1:11:04.7; 16:33.1; 16:33.3; 18:49.3; 19:09.0	0+5 0+5; 0+3 0+2; 0+2 0+0; 0+0 0+2; 0+0 0+1	+1:47.7
5	5	France Marie Dorin Habert; Anaïs Bescond; Jean-Guillaume Béatrix; Martin Fourcade	1:12:04.3; 16:18.4; 17:11.9; 18:37.8; 19:56.2	1+3 0+5; 0+0 0+2; 1+3 0+1; 0+0 0+1; 0+0 0+1	+2:47.3
6	3	Ukraine Natalya Burdyga; Mariya Panfilova; Andriy Deryzemlya; Serhiy Semenov	1:12:05.2; 16:06.4; 17:07.3; 19:23.0; 19:28.5	0+2 1+6; 0+0 0+1; 0+1 0+1; 0+0 1+3; 0+1 0+1	+2:48.2
7	11	United States Susan Dunklee; Hannah Dreissigacker; Tim Burke; Lowell Bailey	1:12:20.1; 16:02.5; 17:55.5; 19:02.9; 19:19.2	1+8 0+5; 0+2 0+1; 1+3 0+1; 0+3 0+1; 0+0 0+3	+3:03.1
8	9	Austria Lisa Hauser; Katharina Innerhofer; Daniel Mesotitsch; Friedrich Pinter	1:12:34.8; 17:39.7; 16:46.3; 18:38.2; 19:30.6	0+0 1+7; 0+0 1+3; 0+0 0+2; 0+0 0+1; 0+0 0+1	+3:17.8
9	8	Belarus Liudmila Kalinchik; Nastassia Dubarezava; Vladimir Chepelin; Evgeny Abramenko	1:13:11.8; 16:29.6; 17:45.2; 19:27.9; 19:29.1	0+5 0+4; 0+0 0+0; 0+3 0+2; 0+2 0+2; 0+0 0+0	+3:54.8
10	10	Canada Megan Imrie; Rosanna Crawford; Brendan Green; Scott Perras	1:13:27.7; 17:49.8; 16:46.6; 19:00.0; 19:51.3	0+0 0+8; 0+0 0+2; 0+0 0+1; 0+0 0+2; 0+0 0+3	+4:10.7
12	13	Switzerland Elisa Gasparin; Selina Gasparin; Benjamin Weger; Simon Hallenbarter	1:13:33.9; 17:27.7; 16:44.3; 19:12.4; 20:09.5	0+4 0+5; 0+2 0+2; 0+1 0+1; 0+2 0+1; 0+0 0+1	+4:16.9
12	14	Poland Krystyna Pałka; Magdalena Gwizdoń; Łukasz Szczurek; Krzysztof Pływaczyk	1:13:36.0; 16:09.9; 16:45.8; 20:28.9; 20.11.4	0+2 0+4; 0+0 0+1; 0+1 0+1; 0+1 0+0; 0+0 0+2	+4:19.0
13	15	Kazakhstan Elena Khrustaleva; Darya Usanova; Yan Savitskiy; Anton Pantov	1:15:46.4; 16:56.5; 17:30.3; 20:08.5; 21:11.1	0+2 0+4; 0+0 0+0; 0+1 0+0; 0+1 0+2; 0+0 0+2	+6:29.4
14	16	Estonia Kadri Lehtla; Daria Yurlova; Kauri Kõiv; Daniil Steptšenko	LAP; 17:09.6; 18:58.8; 19:24.8; LAP	4+10 1+7; 0+3 0+1; 1+3 0+1; 0+1 0+2; 3+3 1+3	
DSQ	7	Germany Evi Sachenbacher-Stehle; Laura Dahlmeier; Daniel Böhm; Simon Schempp	1:10:58.3; 16:27.6; 16:39.0; 18:38.7; 19:13.0	0+3 0+6; 0+2 0+2; 0+0 0+1; 0+1 0+3; 0+0 0+0	+1:41.3
DSQ (4)	6	Russia Olga Zaitseva; Olga Vilukhina; Evgeniy Garanichev; Anton Shipulin	1:11:04.4; 16:35.7; 16:39.3; 19:08.2; 18:41.2	0+2 1+6; 0+1 0+2; 0+1 0+1; 0+0 1+3; 0+0 0+0	+1:47.4

On 27 November 2017, IOC disqualified Olga Vilukhina for doping violations. On 19 May 2022, the IOC reallocated the standings due to the disqualification of the Russian team.
