= Estonia at the 2014 Winter Olympics =

- IOC code: EST
- NOC: Estonian Olympic Committee
- Website: www.eok.ee (in Estonian)

in Sochi
- Competitors: 25 in 6 sports
- Flag bearers: Indrek Tobreluts (opening); Karel Tammjärv (closing)
- Medals: Gold 0 Silver 0 Bronze 0 Total 0

Winter Olympics appearances (overview)
- 1928; 1932; 1936; 1948–1988; 1992; 1994; 1998; 2002; 2006; 2010; 2014; 2018; 2022; 2026

Other related appearances
- Soviet Union (1956–1988)

Estonia competed at the 2014 Winter Olympics in Sochi, Russia from 7 to 23 February 2014. On 24 January 2014, 25 athletes were officially named to the Estonian Olympic team.

== Alpine skiing ==
According to the quota allocation released on January 20, 2014, Estonia had two athletes in qualification position.

Athlete	Event	Run 1		Run 2		Total	
Athlete	Event	Time	Rank	Time	Rank	Time	Rank
Warren Cummings Smith	Men's giant slalom	1:28.25	48	1:29.17	45	2:57.42	45
Warren Cummings Smith	Men's slalom	55.08	54	1:02.20	27	1:57.28	26
Triin Tobi	Women's giant slalom	1:34.65	68	1:34.52	=61	3:09.17	61
Triin Tobi	Women's slalom	1:11.43	57	1:09.02	47	2:20.45	46

== Biathlon ==
Based on their performance at the 2012 and 2013 Biathlon World Championships Estonia qualified 5 men and 4 women.

Men

Athlete	Event	Time	Misses	Rank
Kalev Ermits	Individual	57:04.5	2 (1+1+0+0)	70
Kauri Kõiv	Sprint	26:47.1	3 (2+1)	54
Kauri Kõiv	Pursuit	38:10.2	3 (1+0+0+2)	46
Kauri Kõiv	Individual	58:17.3	7 (1+2+2+2)	78
Roland Lessing	Sprint	27:06.3	3 (0+3)	66
Daniil Steptšenko	Sprint	26:40.5	2 (1+1)	50
Daniil Steptšenko	Pursuit	40:52.0	7 (1+1+1+4)	59
Daniil Steptšenko	Individual	56:14.4	3 (1+2+0+0)	62
Indrek Tobreluts	Sprint	26:46.5	3 (0+3)	53
Indrek Tobreluts	Pursuit	38:00.5	3 (0+0+2+1)	45
Indrek Tobreluts	Individual	53:02.5	2 (0+1+0+1)	29
Kauri Kõiv; Roland Lessing; Daniil Steptšenko; Indrek Tobreluts	Team relay	LAP	15 (12+3)	17

Women

Athlete	Event	Time	Misses	Rank
Grete Gaim	Sprint	24:18.2	2 (1+1)	71
Grete Gaim	Individual	51:28.5	2 (0+0+0+2)	58
Kadri Lehtla	Sprint	24:13.3	4 (2+2)	69
Kadri Lehtla	Individual	49:44.8	2 (1+0+1+0)	44
Johanna Talihärm	Sprint	23:09.3	0 (0+0)	48
Johanna Talihärm	Pursuit	37:52.5	5 (2+0+0+3)	55
Johanna Talihärm	Individual	55:16.5	6 (2+1+0+3)	73
Daria Yurlova	Sprint	24:01.1	2 (1+1)	67
Daria Yurlova	Individual	55:18.0	6 (0+2+2+2)	74
Kadri Lehtla; Grete Gaim; Daria Yurlova; Johanna Talihärm	Team relay	LAP	14 (1+13)	16

Mixed

Athlete	Event	Time	Misses	Rank
Kauri Kõiv; Kadri Lehtla; Daniil Steptšenko; Daria Yurlova	Team relay	LAP	23 (6+17)	15

== Cross-country skiing ==
According to the quota allocation released on January 20, 2014, Estonia had five athletes in qualification position and received two more places as next eligible in the waiting list.

Distance
Men

Athlete	Event	Classical		Freestyle		Final		
Athlete	Event	Time	Rank	Time	Rank	Time	Deficit	Rank
Algo Kärp	15 km classical	—N/a				42:16.5	+3:46.8	42
Aivar Rehemaa	15 km classical	—N/a				41:49.8	+3:20.1	40
Aivar Rehemaa	30 km skiathlon	38:04.3	48	35:09.3	51	1:13:47.2	+5:31.8	51
Aivar Rehemaa	50 km freestyle	—N/a				1:52:22.1	+5:26.9	44
Raido Ränkel	15 km classical	—N/a				43:38.9	+5:09.2	61
Karel Tammjärv	15 km classical	—N/a				42:27.7	+3:58.0	42
Karel Tammjärv	50 km freestyle	—N/a				1:53:23.0	+6:27.8	49
Algo Kärp; Aivar Rehemaa; Raido Ränkel; Karel Tammjärv	4×10 km relay	—N/a				1:32:52.6	+4:10.6	10

Women

Athlete	Event	Final		
Athlete	Event	Time	Deficit	Rank
Triin Ojaste	10 km classical	31:54.3	+3:36.5	45

Sprint

Athlete	Event	Qualification		Quarterfinal		Semifinal		Final	
Athlete	Event	Time	Rank	Time	Rank	Time	Rank	Time	Rank
Peeter Kümmel	Men's sprint	3:44.03	52	Did not advance					
Raido Ränkel	Men's sprint	3:43.82	51	Did not advance					
Siim Sellis	Men's sprint	3:48.06	59	Did not advance					
Peeter Kümmel; Raido Ränkel	Men's team sprint	—N/a				24:26.49	7	Did not advance	
Triin Ojaste	Women's sprint	2:47.07	48	Did not advance					

== Figure skating ==
Estonia had achieved the following quota places.

Athlete	Event	SP		FS		Total	
Athlete	Event	Points	Rank	Points	Rank	Points	Rank
Viktor Romanenkov	Men's singles	61.55	23 Q	78.44	24	139.99	24
Jelena Glebova	Ladies' singles	46.19	29	Did not advance			

== Nordic combined ==
According to the quota allocation released on January 20, 2014, Estonia had four athletes in qualification position.

Athlete	Event	Ski jumping			Cross-country		Total	
Athlete	Event	Distance	Points	Rank	Time	Rank	Time	Rank
Kristjan Ilves	Normal hill/10 km	97.5	117.3	17	26:26.8	44	27:23.8	41
Kristjan Ilves	Large hill/10 km	125.0	117.2	8	25:24.5	43	26:11.5	34
Han Hendrik Piho	Normal hill/10 km	90.5	102.8	43	25:47.4	40	27:42.4	43
Han Hendrik Piho	Large hill/10 km	118.0	95.3	37	24:00.0	32	24:15.0	36
Karl-August Tiirmaa	Normal hill/10 km	89.5	99.9	45	26:23.2	43	28:29.2	44
Karl-August Tiirmaa	Large hill/10 km	123.0	104.3	21	26:06.4	44	27:45.4	44

== Ski jumping ==
Estonia qualified two athletes.

Athlete	Event	Qualification			First round			Final			Total	
Athlete	Event	Distance	Points	Rank	Distance	Points	Rank	Distance	Points	Rank	Points	Rank
Kaarel Nurmsalu	Men's normal hill	92.0	106.6	32 Q	95.0	113.3	37	Did not advance				
Kaarel Nurmsalu	Men's large hill	125.0	103.6	24 Q	124.5	105.9	41	Did not advance				
Siim-Tanel Sammelselg	Men's normal hill	73.0	66.2	51	Did not advance							
Siim-Tanel Sammelselg	Men's large hill	107.5	69.0	49	Did not advance							
