= Biathlon at the 2014 Winter Olympics – Women's individual =

Women's individual at the XXII Olympic Winter Games
- Pictogram for biathlon
- Venue: Laura Biathlon & Ski Complex
- Date: 14 February 2014
- Competitors: 82 from 32 nations
- Winning time: 43:19.6

Medalists
| 1st place, gold medalist(s) | | Darya Domracheva | Belarus |
| 2nd place, silver medalist(s) | | Selina Gasparin | Switzerland |
| 3rd place, bronze medalist(s) | | Nadezhda Skardino | Belarus |

The Women's 15 kilometre individual biathlon competition of the Sochi 2014 Olympics was held at Laura Biathlon & Ski Complex on 14 February 2014.

== Schedule ==
All times are (UTC+4).

| Date | Time | Round |
|---|---|---|
| 14 February | 18:00–19:32 | Final |

== Results ==
The race was started at 18:00.

| Rank | Bib | Name | Country | Time | Penalties (P+S+P+S) | Deficit |
|---|---|---|---|---|---|---|
| 1st place, gold medalist(s) | 13 | Darya Domracheva | Belarus | 43:19.6 | 1 (0+1+0+0) | — |
| 2nd place, silver medalist(s) | 27 | Selina Gasparin | Switzerland | 44:35.3 | 0 (0+0+0+0) | +1:15.7 |
| 3rd place, bronze medalist(s) | 18 | Nadezhda Skardino | Belarus | 44:57.8 | 0 (0+0+0+0) | +1:38.2 |
| 4 | 30 | Gabriela Soukalova | Czech Republic | 45:17.1 | 2 (0+1+0+1) | +1:57.5 |
| 5 | 45 | Anaïs Bescond | France | 45:34.0 | 2 (0+2+0+0) | +2:14.4 |
| 6 | 23 | Veronika Vítková | Czech Republic | 45:46.0 | 1 (0+0+0+1) | +2:26.4 |
| 7 | 62 | Juliya Dzhyma | Ukraine | 45:49.9 | 1 (0+1+0+0) | +2:30.3 |
| 8 | 25 | Olena Pidhrushna | Ukraine | 45:59.5 | 1 (0+0+0+1) | +2:39.9 |
| 9 | 21 | Kaisa Mäkäräinen | Finland | 46:02.5 | 3 (0+1+0+2) | +2:42.9 |
| 10 | 57 | Krystyna Pałka | Poland | 46:27.3 | 0 (0+0+0+0) | +3:07.7 |
| 11 | 31 | Teja Gregorin | Slovenia | 46:38.7 | 2 (1+0+0+1) | +3:19.1 |
| 12 | 50 | Monika Hojnisz | Poland | 46:44.3 | 2 (1+0+0+1) | +3:24.7 |
| 13 | 63 | Laura Dahlmeier | Germany | 46:45.7 | 1 (1+0+0+0) | +3:26.1 |
| 14 | 32 | Karin Oberhofer | Italy | 46:46.6 | 2 (0+0+0+2) | +3:27.0 |
| DSQ | 2 | Olga Zaitseva | Russia | 47:06.9 | 2 (0+0+1+1) | +3:47.3 |
| 16 | 15 | Tora Berger | Norway | 47:12.6 | 3 (1+2+0+0) | +3:53.0 |
| 17 | 58 | Marie-Laure Brunet | France | 47:13.6 | 0 (0+0+0+0) | +3:54.0 |
| 18 | 10 | Tiril Eckhoff | Norway | 47:20.4 | 3 (0+1+1+1) | +4:00.8 |
| 19 | 1 | Valj Semerenko | Ukraine | 47:28.2 | 2 (1+0+1+0) | +4:08.6 |
| 20 | 79 | Evi Sachenbacher-Stehle | Germany | 47:30.4 | 3 (3+0+0+0) | +4:10.8 |
| 21 | 8 | Éva Tófalvi | Romania | 47:30.8 | 1 (0+0+1+0) | +4:11.2 |
| 22 | 43 | Eva Puskarčíková | Czech Republic | 47:34.6 | 1 (0+0+0+1) | +4:15.0 |
| 23 | 60 | Hannah Dreissigacker | United States | 47:51.7 | 2 (1+0+0+1) | +4:32.1 |
| 24 | 59 | Elise Ringen | Norway | 47:54.0 | 2 (0+0+0+2) | +4:34.4 |
| 25 | 61 | Liudmila Kalinchik | Belarus | 48:06.2 | 2 (0+1+0+1) | +4:46.6 |
| 26 | 80 | Marine Bolliet | France | 48:12.1 | 2 (0+2+0+0) | +4:52.5 |
| 27 | 35 | Anastasiya Kuzmina | Slovakia | 48:14.1 | 4 (0+1+0+3) | +4:54.5 |
| 28 | 51 | Katharina Innerhofer | Austria | 48:28.3 | 4 (1+1+1+1) | +5:08.7 |
| 29 | 37 | Vita Semerenko | Ukraine | 48:29.2 | 3 (0+0+0+3) | +5:09.6 |
| 30 | 3 | Megan Imrie | Canada | 48:32.7 | 2 (1+0+1+0) | +5:13.1 |
| 31 | 14 | Weronika Nowakowska-Ziemniak | Poland | 48:35.2 | 4 (1+1+2+0) | +5:15.6 |
| 32 | 78 | Magdalena Gwizdoń | Poland | 48:44.1 | 2 (1+1+0+0) | +5:24.5 |
| 33 | 7 | Elisa Gasparin | Switzerland | 48:46.9 | 3 (1+1+1+0) | +5:27.3 |
| 34 | 5 | Susan Dunklee | United States | 48:54.1 | 5 (1+1+2+1) | +5:34.5 |
| 35 | 47 | Nadzeya Pisarava | Belarus | 48:55.4 | 3 (0+3+0+0) | +5:35.8 |
| 36 | 33 | Lisa Hauser | Austria | 48:56.4 | 1 (0+0+0+1) | +5:36.8 |
| 37 | 66 | Irene Cadurisch | Switzerland | 49:01.0 | 1 (0+0+1+0) | +5:41.4 |
| 38 | 24 | Franziska Hildebrand | Germany | 49:06.4 | 2 (0+2+0+0) | +5:46.8 |
| 39 | 19 | Marie Dorin Habert | France | 49:06.5 | 4 (2+1+0+1) | +5:46.9 |
| 40 | 53 | Darya Usanova | Kazakhstan | 49:13.5 | 2 (1+0+0+1) | +5:53.9 |
| 41 | 70 | Galina Vishnevskaya | Kazakhstan | 49:26.9 | 2 (1+1+0+0) | +6:07.3 |
| 42 | 20 | Diana Rasimovičiūtė | Lithuania | 49:32.5 | 3 (1+1+0+1) | +6:12.9 |
| 43 | 64 | Alexia Runggaldier | Italy | 49:35.6 | 1 (1+0+0+0) | +6:16.0 |
| 44 | 52 | Kadri Lehtla | Estonia | 49:44.8 | 2 (1+0+1+0) | +6:25.2 |
| 45 | 74 | Nicole Gontier | Italy | 49:51.2 | 4 (0+1+2+1) | +6:31.6 |
| 46 | 54 | Zhang Yan | China | 49:57.0 | 0 (0+0+0+0) | +6:37.4 |
| 47 | 11 | Elena Khrustaleva | Kazakhstan | 50:00.1 | 3 (2+1+0+0) | +6:40.5 |
| 48 | 28 | Laure Soulie | Andorra | 50:04.2 | 3 (1+1+0+1) | +6:44.6 |
| 49 | 82 | Olga Podchufarova | Russia | 50:13.3 | 2 (0+1+0+1) | +6:53.7 |
| 50 | 49 | Jana Gereková | Slovakia | 50:20.8 | 5 (0+1+1+3) | +7:01.2 |
| 51 | 83 | Megan Heinicke | Canada | 50:26.8 | 4 (3+0+0+1) | +7:07.2 |
| 52 | 17 | Fuyuko Suzuki | Japan | 50:27.4 | 3 (0+1+0+2) | +7:07.8 |
| 53 | 48 | Yana Romanova | Russia | 50:42.1 | 4 (1+1+2+0) | +7:22.5 |
| 54 | 39 | Victoria Padial | Spain | 50:48.5 | 3 (1+0+1+1) | +7:28.9 |
| 55 | 41 | Sara Studebaker | United States | 50:53.4 | 4 (2+1+1+0) | +7:33.8 |
| 56 | 55 | Ann Kristin Flatland | Norway | 51:00.0 | 4 (1+2+0+1) | +7:40.4 |
| 57 | 4 | Tang Jialin | China | 51:03.7 | 3 (0+1+0+2) | +7:44.1 |
| 58 | 65 | Grete Gaim | Estonia | 51:28.5 | 2 (0+0+0+2) | +8:08.9 |
| 59 | 76 | Martina Chrapánová | Slovakia | 52:00.5 | 5 (2+0+1+2) | +8:40.9 |
| 60 | 68 | Jitka Landová | Czech Republic | 52:05.7 | 6 (2+1+2+1) | +8:46.1 |
| 61 | 67 | Ekaterina Glazyrina | Russia | 52:13.7 | 4 (1+0+2+1) | +8:54.1 |
| 62 | 46 | Aita Gasparin | Switzerland | 52:14.9 | 5 (1+3+1+0) | +8:55.3 |
| 63 | 44 | Zina Kocher | Canada | 53:00.7 | 8 (1+4+0+3) | +9:41.1 |
| 64 | 81 | Lanny Barnes | United States | 53:02.2 | 3 (1+0+1+1) | +9:42.6 |
| 65 | 84 | Alina Raikova | Kazakhstan | 53:15.6 | 3 (1+0+1+1) | +9:56.0 |
| 66 | 71 | Terézia Poliaková | Slovakia | 53:19.8 | 6 (0+3+1+2) | +10:00.2 |
| 67 | 73 | Rosanna Crawford | Canada | 53:29.8 | 5 (2+1+1+1) | +10:10.2 |
| 68 | 77 | Miki Kobayashi | Japan | 54:01.0 | 4 (1+2+1+0) | +10:41.4 |
| 69 | 26 | Mun Ji-Hee | South Korea | 54:06.7 | 3 (0+0+2+1) | +10:47.1 |
| 70 | 56 | Emőke Szőcs | Hungary | 54:12.3 | 6 (1+1+1+3) | +10:52.7 |
| 71 | 6 | Amanda Lightfoot | Great Britain | 54:38.1 | 5 (1+2+1+1) | +11:18.5 |
| 72 | 29 | Desislava Stoyanova | Bulgaria | 54:41.1 | 6 (1+2+0+3) | +11:21.5 |
| 73 | 9 | Johanna Talihärm | Estonia | 55:16.5 | 6 (2+1+0+3) | +11:56.9 |
| 74 | 75 | Daria Yurlova | Estonia | 55:18.0 | 6 (0+2+2+2) | +11:58.4 |
| 75 | 42 | Yuki Nakajima | Japan | 56:00.2 | 6 (3+2+1+0) | +12:40.6 |
| 76 | 12 | Jaqueline Mourão | Brazil | 57:22.6 | 7 (1+2+3+1) | +14:03.0 |
| 77 | 72 | Song Na | China | 59:43.3 | 6 (0+2+2+2) | +16:23.7 |
| 78 | 36 | Lucy Glanville | Australia | 1:01:00.7 | 4 (1+0+1+2) | +17:41.1 |
| | 16 | Žanna Juškāne | Latvia | DNF | 6 (2+2+2) | |
| | 34 | Tanja Karišik | Bosnia and Herzegovina | DNF | 1 (1) | |
| | 38 | Franziska Preuß | Germany | DNF | 5 (2+3) | |
| | 69 | Rina Suzuki | Japan | DNF | 2 (0+2) | |
| | 22 | Mari Laukkanen | Finland | DNS | | |
| | 40 | Dorothea Wierer | Italy | DNS | | |

On 27 November 2017, IOC disqualified Yana Romanova for doping violations.
