= Biathlon at the 2014 Winter Olympics – Women's sprint =

Women's sprint at the XXII Olympic Winter Games
- Pictogram for biathlon
- Venue: Laura Biathlon & Ski Complex
- Date: 9 February 2014
- Competitors: 84 from 33 nations
- Winning time: 21:06.8

Medalists
1st place, gold medalist(s)		Anastasiya Kuzmina	Slovakia
2nd place, silver medalist(s)		Olga Vilukhina	Russia
3rd place, bronze medalist(s)		Vita Semerenko	Ukraine

The Women's 7.5 km sprint biathlon competition of the Sochi 2014 Olympics took place at Laura Biathlon & Ski Complex on 9 February 2014. It was won by Anastasiya Kuzmina from Slovakia, who was the defending champion. Olga Vilukhina from Russia won the silver medal, and Vita Semerenko from Ukraine won the bronze. Semerenko had competed in this event at the Olympics but never previously won an Olympic medal.

== Summary ==
Evi Sachenbacher-Stehle took an early lead in the event, after missing one target in the standing shooting. Soon, her result was improved by four seconds by Anaïs Bescond, also with one missing target. Kuzmina, who started 33rd (compared to Bescond's 14th starting number) shot flawlessly and edged Bescond by 29.9 seconds. Later Bescond was pushed from the medal position first by Karin Oberhofer (2 seconds), and then by Vilukhina (8 seconds to Oberhofer). Semerenko, who after the second shooting was fifth, by 5.9 km was second, ahead of Vilukhina, but at the finish line lost 2.2 seconds to Vilukhina, taking bronze and pushing Oberhofer out of the medal position. Dorothea Wierer, who was third after the standing shooting (behind Kuzmina and Vilukhina) finished sixth.

On 27 November 2017, Russian biathlete Olga Vilukhina was stripped of her olympic medal due to doping violations. Her teammate Yana Romanova was also disqualified. On 1 December 2017, Olga Zaitseva from Russia was disqualified. On 24 September 2020, the Court of Arbitration for Sport removed the sanctions from biathletes Olga Vilukhina, Yana Romanova, but upheld them on their teammate Olga Zaitseva.

== Schedule ==
All dates and times are (UTC+4).

Date	Time	Round
9 February 2014	18:30–19:36	Final

== Results ==
The race was started at 18:30.

Rank	Bib	Name	Country	Time	Penalties (P+S)	Deficit
1st place, gold medalist(s)	33	Anastasiya Kuzmina	Slovakia	21:06.8	0 (0+0)	—
2nd place, silver medalist(s)	56	Olga Vilukhina	Russia	21:26.7	0 (0+0)	+19.9
3rd place, bronze medalist(s)	62	Vita Semerenko	Ukraine	21:28.5	0 (0+0)	+21.7
4	46	Karin Oberhofer	Italy	21:34.7	0 (0+0)	+27.9
5	14	Anaïs Bescond	France	21:36.7	1 (1+0)	+29.9
6	64	Dorothea Wierer	Italy	21:37.4	0 (0+0)	+30.6
7	39	Weronika Nowakowska-Ziemniak	Poland	21:37.6	1 (1+0)	+30.8
8	41	Elisa Gasparin	Switzerland	21:38.2	0 (0+0)	+31.4
9	22	Darya Domracheva	Belarus	21:38.6	1 (1+0)	+31.8
10	19	Tora Berger	Norway	21:40.6	1 (1+0)	+33.8
11	6	Evi Sachenbacher-Stehle	Germany	21:40.8	1 (0+1)	+34.0
12	43	Valj Semerenko	Ukraine	21:44.9	1 (0+1)	+38.1
13	58	Selina Gasparin	Switzerland	21:46.5	1 (0+1)	+39.7
14	11	Susan Dunklee	United States	21:48.3	1 (0+1)	+41.5
15	49	Teja Gregorin	Slovenia	21:48.9	1 (0+1)	+42.1
16	55	Veronika Vítková	Czech Republic	21:50.8	0 (0+0)	+44.0
17	17	Nadezhda Skardino	Belarus	21:50.9	0 (0+0)	+44.1
18	10	Tiril Eckhoff	Norway	21:51.4	1 (0+1)	+44.6
19	81	Yana Romanova	Russia	21:53.4	0 (0+0)	+46.6
20	60	Marie Dorin Habert	France	21:55.0	0 (0+0)	+48.2
21	82	Monika Hojnisz	Poland	21:55.1	0 (0+0)	+48.3
22	34	Andrea Henkel	Germany	22:01.5	1 (0+1)	+54.7
22	47	Éva Tófalvi	Romania	22:01.5	1 (1+0)	+54.7
24	68	Ann Kristin Flatland	Norway	22:10.6	1 (0+1)	+1:03.8
25	71	Rosanna Crawford	Canada	22:10.8	1 (0+1)	+1:04.0
26	30	Olena Pidhrushna	Ukraine	22:12.8	1 (0+1)	+1:06.0
27	5	Lisa Hauser	Austria	22:15.6	0 (0+0)	+1:08.8
DSQ	61	Olga Zaytseva	Russia	22:16.6	1 (1+0)	+1:09.8
29	16	Gabriela Soukalová	Czech Republic	22:17.5	3 (3+0)	+1:10.7
30	51	Kaisa Mäkäräinen	Finland	22:18.4	2 (0+2)	+1:11.6
31	40	Megan Imrie	Canada	22:19.5	1 (0+1)	+1:12.7
32	12	Zina Kocher	Canada	22:25.5	2 (1+1)	+1:18.7
33	8	Krystyna Pałka	Poland	22:27.8	1 (1+0)	+1:21.0
34	65	Nastassia Dubarezava	Belarus	22:29.7	1 (0+1)	+1:22.9
35	42	Synnøve Solemdal	Norway	22:32.1	2 (1+1)	+1:25.3
36	31	Mari Laukkanen	Finland	22:37.3	2 (0+2)	+1:30.5
37	45	Liudmila Kalinchik	Belarus	22:37.8	2 (1+1)	+1:31.0
38	27	Michela Ponza	Italy	22:47.0	0 (0+0)	+1:40.2
39	25	Fuyuko Suzuki	Japan	22:47.4	1 (0+1)	+1:40.6
40	67	Magdalena Gwizdoń	Poland	22:51.2	2 (1+1)	+1:44.4
41	50	Franziska Preuß	Germany	22:53.1	2 (2+0)	+1:46.3
42	23	Juliya Dzhyma	Ukraine	22:55.5	3 (1+2)	+1:48.7
43	1	Jana Gereková	Slovakia	22:58.0	3 (1+2)	+1:51.2
44	74	Sara Studebaker	United States	22:59.5	1 (1+0)	+1:52.7
45	37	Eva Puskarčíková	Czech Republic	23:00.9	1 (1+0)	+1:54.1
46	73	Laura Dahlmeier	Germany	23:03.2	2 (0+2)	+1:56.4
47	84	Anaïs Chévalier	France	23:03.4	1 (0+1)	+1:56.6
48	79	Johanna Talihärm	Estonia	23:09.3	0 (0+0)	+2:02.5
49	59	Zhang Yan	China	23:09.4	0 (0+0)	+2:02.6
50	24	Jitka Landová	Czech Republic	23:16.9	2 (1+1)	+2:10.1
51	54	Diana Rasimovičiūtė	Lithuania	23:18.6	2 (1+1)	+2:11.8
52	3	Victoria Padial	Spain	23:21.5	1 (0+1)	+2:14.7
53	57	Annelies Cook	United States	23:23.4	2 (0+2)	+2:16.6
54	80	Nicole Gontier	Italy	23:26.3	4 (1+3)	+2:19.5
55	52	Tang Jialin	China	23:26.7	2 (0+2)	+2:19.9
56	53	Marie-Laure Brunet	France	23:27.4	0 (0+0)	+2:20.6
57	29	Elena Khrustaleva	Kazakhstan	23:29.6	2 (2+0)	+2:22.8
58	66	Darya Usanova	Kazakhstan	23:33.3	1 (1+0)	+2:26.5
59	78	Megan Heinicke	Canada	23:34.5	3 (1+2)	+2:27.7
60	7	Ekaterina Shumilova	Russia	23:38.4	2 (0+2)	+2:31.6
61	48	Desislava Stoyanova	Bulgaria	23:48.1	2 (1+1)	+2:41.3
62	77	Martina Chrapánová	Slovakia	23:48.3	2 (0+2)	+2:41.5
63	21	Song Chaoqing	China	23:49.5	1 (1+0)	+2:42.7
64	9	Galina Vishnevskaya	Kazakhstan	23:52.0	3 (2+1)	+2:45.2
65	63	Hannah Dreissigacker	United States	23:55.0	4 (1+3)	+2:48.2
66	2	Laure Soulie	Andorra	23:57.8	2 (1+1)	+2:51.0
67	69	Daria Yurlova	Estonia	24:01.1	2 (1+1)	+2:54.3
68	72	Yuki Nakajima	Japan	24:12.9	2 (1+1)	+3:06.1
69	38	Kadri Lehtla	Estonia	24:13.3	4 (2+2)	+3:06.5
70	44	Emőke Szőcs	Hungary	24:15.4	2 (0+2)	+3:08.6
71	15	Grete Gaim	Estonia	24:18.2	2 (1+1)	+3:11.4
72	70	Paulína Fialková	Slovakia	24:27.1	5 (3+2)	+3:20.3
73	83	Marina Lebedeva	Kazakhstan	24:31.9	2 (1+1)	+3:25.1
74	4	Mun Ji-Hee	South Korea	24:32.0	1 (0+1)	+3:25.2
75	20	Amanda Lightfoot	Great Britain	24:48.9	3 (2+1)	+3:42.1
76	28	Katharina Innerhofer	Austria	24:49.0	4 (1+3)	+3:42.2
77	18	Jaqueline Mourão	Brazil	25:06.4	1 (0+1)	+3:59.6
78	26	Tanja Karišik	Bosnia and Herzegovina	25:06.8	2 (1+1)	+4:00.0
79	32	Žanna Juškāne	Latvia	25:36.5	6 (2+4)	+4:29.7
80	75	Rina Suzuki	Japan	25:40.6	2 (0+2)	+4:33.8
81	35	Miki Kobayashi	Japan	25:52.3	5 (1+4)	+4:45.5
82	36	Lucy Glanville	Australia	26:57.1	2 (0+2)	+5:50.3
83	76	Song Na	China	27:01.5	4 (3+1)	+5:54.7
84	13	Alexandra Camenscic	Moldova	27:37.0	5 (2+3)	+6:30.2
