= Biathlon at the 2014 Winter Olympics – Men's pursuit =

Men's pursuit at the XXII Olympic Winter Games
- Pictogram for biathlon
- Venue: Laura Biathlon & Ski Complex
- Date: 10 February 2014
- Competitors: 59 from 21 nations
- Winning time: 33:48.6

Medalists
1st place, gold medalist(s)		Martin Fourcade	France
2nd place, silver medalist(s)		Ondřej Moravec	Czech Republic
3rd place, bronze medalist(s)		Jean-Guillaume Béatrix	France

The men's pursuit competition of the Sochi 2014 Olympics was held at Laura Biathlon & Ski Complex on 10 February 2014. Martin Fourcade won the gold medal.

== Qualification ==
Countries were assigned quotas using a combination of the Nation Cup scores of their top 3 athletes in the individual, sprint, and relay competitions at the 2012 World Championships in Ruhpolding, Germany, and the 2013 World Championships in Nové Město na Moravě, Czech Republic. The top 20 nations would be able to start four athletes in the sprint, while nations 21 through 28 could start one each. Nations below 28 could only start if any nation decided to vacate a quota spot.

During the 2012–13 or 2013–14 Biathlon World Cup season the athlete must have two results at IBU Cup, Open European Championships, World Championships or World Cup in the Sprint or Individual that at a maximum 20% behind the average time of the top three athletes. Or, two placings in the top half at the Junior World Championships. They also can have a combination of both criteria (one of each).

For the pursuit race the top 60 athletes in the sprint race qualified to compete.

== Schedule ==
All dates and times are (UTC+4).

Date	Time	Round
10 February	19:00	Final

== Results ==
The race was started at 19:00.

Rank	Bib	Name	Country	Start	Time	Penalties (P+P+S+S)	Deficit
1st place, gold medalist(s)	6	Martin Fourcade	France	0:12	33:48.6	1 (0+0+1+0)	—
2nd place, silver medalist(s)	8	Ondřej Moravec	Czech Republic	0:15	34:02.7	0 (0+0+0+0)	+14.1
3rd place, bronze medalist(s)	14	Jean-Guillaume Béatrix	France	0:39	34:12.8	1 (0+0+1+0)	+24.2
4	1	Ole Einar Bjørndalen	Norway	0:00	34:14.5	3 (0+1+1+1)	+25.9
5	15	Simon Schempp	Germany	0:43	34:27.7	1 (0+0+0+1)	+39.1
6	9	Emil Hegle Svendsen	Norway	0:29	34:28.8	1 (0+1+0+0)	+40.2
7	7	Simon Eder	Austria	0:14	34:28.9	2 (1+0+0+1)	+40.3
8	17	Andrejs Rastorgujevs	Latvia	0:47	34:36.9	1 (0+0+1+0)	+48.3
9	2	Dominik Landertinger	Austria	0:01	34:37.5	3 (0+0+1+2)	+48.9
10	13	Nathan Smith	Canada	0:36	34:37.7	1 (0+0+1+0)	+49.1
11	20	Christoph Sumann	Austria	0:52	34:43.0	0 (0+0+0+0)	+54.4
12	18	Fredrik Lindström	Sweden	0:48	34:45.7	3 (0+0+1+2)	+57.1
13	4	Anton Shipulin	Russia	0:06	34:47.1	3 (0+1+1+1)	+58.5
14	27	Evgeniy Garanichev	Russia	1:10	34:47.7	1 (0+0+1+0)	+59.1
15	21	Erik Lesser	Germany	0:53	34:53.1	3 (1+1+0+1)	+1:04.5
16	12	Lukas Hofer	Italy	0:35	34:53.1	2 (1+0+0+1)	+1:04.5
17	36	Simon Fourcade	France	1:31	35:15.0	1 (0+0+1+0)	+1:26.4
18	34	Arnd Peiffer	Germany	1:28	35:21.4	1 (0+0+1+0)	+1:32.8
19	3	Jaroslav Soukup	Czech Republic	0:06	35:35.0	4 (0+0+2+2)	+1:46.4
20	46	Simon Desthieux	France	1:45	35:35.6	1 (0+0+1+0)	+1:47.0
21	19	Tim Burke	United States	0:50	35:37.0	2 (1+0+0+1)	+1:48.4
22	37	Matej Kazár	Slovakia	1:31	35:38.4	3 (1+0+1+1)	+1:49.8
23	26	Klemen Bauer	Slovenia	1:07	35:39.8	4 (0+1+2+1)	+1:51.2
24	11	Dominik Windisch	Italy	0:34	35:40.0	4 (1+0+2+1)	+1:51.4
25	5	Jean-Philippe Leguellec	Canada	0:10	35:45.3	3 (0+0+2+1)	+1:56.7
26	39	Tarjei Bø	Norway	1:37	35:50.5	2 (0+1+0+1)	+2:01.9
27	42	Tobias Arwidson	Sweden	1:38	35:51.2	0 (0+0+0+0)	+2:02.6
28	43	Yan Savitskiy	Kazakhstan	1:40	35:57.0	1 (0+1+0+0)	+2:08.4
29	25	Björn Ferry	Sweden	1:03	36:06.9	3 (1+0+2+0)	+2:18.3
30	10	Jakov Fak	Slovenia	0:33	36:11.2	6 (2+1+1+2)	+2:22.6
31	55	Johannes Thingnes Bø	Norway	2:18	36:12.4	1 (1+0+0+0)	+2:23.8
32	28	Dmitry Malyshko	Russia	1:15	36:17.0	2 (0+1+1+0)	+2:28.4
33	24	Carl Johan Bergman	Sweden	1:02	36:20.9	3 (0+1+0+2)	+2:32.3
34	23	Brendan Green	Canada	0:58	36:21.2	4 (2+1+1+0)	+2:32.6
35	22	Andriy Deryzemlya	Ukraine	0:56	36:21.5	3 (0+0+1+2)	+2:32.9
36	38	Daniel Mesotitsch	Austria	1:33	36:23.4	3 (1+0+1+1)	+2:34.8
37	35	Lowell Bailey	United States	1:31	36:34.8	3 (0+1+1+1)	+2:46.2
38	41	Serhiy Semenov	Ukraine	1:37	36:48.1	3 (0+2+1+0)	+2:59.5
39	48	Tomas Kaukėnas	Lithuania	1:53	36:49.8	3 (1+0+0+2)	+3:01.2
40	29	Vladimir Chepelin	Belarus	1:16	36:57.2	1 (0+0+1+0)	+3:08.6
41	47	Christian De Lorenzi	Italy	1:52	36:58.2	2 (1+1+0+0)	+3:09.6
42	58	Christoph Stephan	Germany	2:22	37:18.8	1 (0+0+0+1)	+3:30.2
43	32	Artem Pryma	Ukraine	1:24	37:39.3	4 (0+1+2+1)	+3:50.7
44	53	Indrek Tobreluts	Estonia	2:13	38:00.5	3 (0+0+2+1)	+4:11.9
45	54	Kauri Kõiv	Estonia	2:14	38:10.2	3 (1+0+0+2)	+4:21.6
46	30	Cornel Puchianu	Romania	1:17	38:19.8	6 (0+2+1+3)	+4:31.2
47	49	Krasimir Anev	Bulgaria	1:55	38:47.6	5 (0+1+3+1)	+4:59.0
48	51	Janez Marič	Slovenia	2:08	38:58.4	3 (0+1+0+2)	+5:09.8
49	33	Sergey Novikov	Belarus	1:27	38:59.5	3 (0+1+1+1)	+5:10.9
50	56	Evgeny Abramenko	Belarus	2:22	39:11.5	5 (0+0+4+1)	+5:22.9
51	52	Pavol Hurajt	Slovakia	2:12	39:14.3	1 (1+0+0+0)	+5:25.7
52	45	Leif Nordgren	United States	1:44	39:31.4	7 (3+2+1+1)	+5:42.8
53	44	Serhiy Sednev	Ukraine	1:43	39:33.8	3 (1+0+1+1)	+5:45.2
54	60	Vladimir Iliev	Bulgaria	2:22	39:44.6	7 (3+1+2+1)	+5.56.0
55	57	Yuryi Liadov	Belarus	2:22	39:46.2	4 (1+1+0+2)	+5:57.6
56	40	Serafin Wiestner	Switzerland	1:37	39:48.1	7 (2+1+3+1)	+5:59.5
57	59	Sergey Naumik	Kazakhstan	2:22	40:06.5	4 (1+0+2+1)	+6:17.9
58	50	Daniil Steptšenko	Estonia	2:07	40:52.0	7 (1+1+1+4)	+7:03.4
	31	Michal Šlesingr	Czech Republic	1:18	DNS		
–	16	Evgeny Ustyugov	Russia	0:46	~~34:25.3~~ DSQ	1 (0+1+0+0)	+36.7
