= Biathlon at the 2014 Winter Olympics – Men's relay =

Men's relay at the XXII Olympic Winter Games
- Pictogram for biathlon
- Venue: Laura Biathlon & Ski Complex
- Date: 22 February 2014
- Competitors: 76 from 19 nations
- Winning time: 1:12:15.9

Medalists
1st place, gold medalist(s)		Erik Lesser; Daniel Böhm; Arnd Peiffer; Simon Schempp	Germany
2nd place, silver medalist(s)		Christoph Sumann; Daniel Mesotitsch; Simon Eder; Dominik Landertinger	Austria
3rd place, bronze medalist(s)		Tarjei Bø; Johannes Thingnes Bø; Ole Einar Bjørndalen; Emil Hegle Svendsen	Norway

The men's relay competition of the Sochi 2014 Olympics was held at Laura Biathlon & Ski Complex on 22 February 2014.

On 15 February 2020, the International Biathlon Union announced that because of a doping violation, Evgeny Ustyugov and Russian men's 4 × 7.5 km relay team had been disqualified for the gold medal. In September 2025 the IOC Executive Board approved medal reallocations. On 15 February 2026, the reallocated teams were awarded medals during a special ceremony at the 2026 Winter Olympics.

== Results ==
The race started at 18:30.

Rank	Bib	Country	Time	Penalties (P+S)	Deficit
1st place, gold medalist(s)	1	Germany Erik Lesser; Daniel Böhm; Arnd Peiffer; Simon Schempp	1:12:19.4; 17:13.7; 18:17.4; 17:54.5; 18:53.8	0+1 0+1; 0+0 0+0; 0+0 0+1; 0+0 0+0; 0+1 0+0	+3.5
2nd place, silver medalist(s)	3	Austria Christoph Sumann; Daniel Mesotitsch; Simon Eder; Dominik Landertinger	1:12:45.7; 17:26.7; 18:11.4; 18:04.1; 19:03.5	0+4 0+3; 0+1 0+0; 0+2 0+0; 0+0 0+2; 0+1 0+1	+29.8
3rd place, bronze medalist(s)	5	Norway Tarjei Bø; Johannes Thingnes Bø; Ole Einar Bjørndalen; Emil Hegle Svendsen	1:13:10.3; 17:03.4; 18:07.6; 18:12.6; 19:46.7	0+2 1+3; 0+0 0+0; 0+1 0+0; 0+0 0+0; 0+1 1+3	+54.4
4	16	Italy Christian De Lorenzi; Dominik Windisch; Markus Windisch; Lukas Hofer	1:13:15.5; 17:36.0; 18:01.4; 18:54.2; 18:43.9	0+4 0+7; 0+0 0+2; 0+2 0+1; 0+2 0+2; 0+0 0+2	+59.6
5	9	Slovenia Peter Dokl; Jakov Fak; Klemen Bauer; Janez Marič	1:13:43.1; 18:04.4; 17:33.3; 18:03.9; 20:01.5	0+1 0+4; 0+0 0+0; 0+0 0+0; 0+1 0+1; 0+0 0+3	+1:27.2
6	12	Canada Jean-Philippe Le Guellec; Scott Perras; Brendan Green; Nathan Smith	1:13:46.2; 17:47.2; 18:04.3; 18:24.4; 19:30.3	0+4 1+6; 0+0 1+3; 0+1 0+0; 0+1 0+1; 0+2 0+2	+1:30.3
7	6	France Alexis Bœuf; Jean-Guillaume Béatrix; Simon Desthieux; Martin Fourcade	1:13:46.4; 17:35.4; 18:13.0; 18:42.9; 19:15.1	0+3 0+4; 0+0 0+0; 0+1 0+2; 0+0 0+2; 0+2 0+0	+1:30.5
8	10	Ukraine Dmytro Pidruchnyi; Andriy Deryzemlya; Artem Pryma; Serhiy Semenov	1:14:21.1; 17:35.4; 18:17.4; 18:59.9; 19:28.4	0+6 0+1; 0+2 0+0; 0+2 0+1; 0+1 0+0; 0+1 0+0	+2:05.2
9	2	Sweden Tobias Arwidson; Björn Ferry; Fredrik Lindström; Carl Johan Bergman	1:14:32.0; 18:02.6; 18:18.2; 18:52.9; 19:18.3	0+4 0+1; 0+0 0+0; 0+0 0+0; 0+3 0+0; 0+1 0+1	+2:16.1
10	7	Czech Republic Michal Krčmář; Jaroslav Soukup; Tomáš Krupčík; Ondřej Moravec	1:15:11.9; 17:37.1; 18:14.8; 19:54.3; 19:25.7	0+3 0+2; 0+0 0+0; 0+1 0+1; 0+2 0+1; 0+0 0+0	+2:56.0
11	11	Slovakia Pavol Hurajt; Tomáš Hasilla; Miroslav Matiaško; Matej Kazár	1:15:23.8; 17:33.4; 18:37.8; 19:21.0; 19:51.6	0+3 1+6; 0+0 0+0; 0+0 0+2; 0+1 0+1; 0+2 1+3	+3:07.9
12	17	Belarus Sergey Novikov; Vladimir Chepelin; Yuryi Liadov; Evgeny Abramenko	1:16:02.3; 18:21.3; 18:52.2; 19:01.8; 19:47.0	0+1 0+4; 0+0 0+1; 0+1 0+0; 0+0 0+1; 0+0 0+2	+3:46.4
13	8	Switzerland Claudio Böckli; Ivan Joller; Serafin Wiestner; Benjamin Weger	1:16:15.8; 18:28.3; 19:11.6; 18:50.0; 19:45.9	0+3 0+7; 0+0 0+3; 0+0 0+3; 0+3 0+0; 0+1 0+1	+3:59.9
14	13	Bulgaria Michail Kletcherov; Ivan Zlatev; Vladimir Iliev; Krasimir Anev	1:17:38.4; 18:25.9; 20:40.4; 19:14.9; 19:17.2	0+3 2+5; 0+0 0+1; 0+1 2+3; 0+2 0+1; 0+0 0+0	+5:22.5
15	18	United States Lowell Bailey; Russell Currier; Sean Doherty; Leif Nordgren	1:17:39.1; 17:20.7; 20:11.3; 19:37.3; 20:29.8	3+8 0+4; 0+0 0+0; 3+3 0+2; 0+3 0+0; 0+2 0+2	+5:23.2
16	14	Estonia Daniil Steptšenko; Kalev Ermits; Kauri Kõiv; Roland Lessing	LAP; 18:05.5; 20:08.4; 19:31.2; LAP	2+7 1+5; 0+1 0+0; 0+0 1+3; 1+3 0+0; 1+3 0+2	
17	15	Kazakhstan Anton Pantov; Sergey Naumik; Alexandr Trifonov; Dias Keneshev	LAP; 18:13.3; 19:18.0; 20:02.4; LAP	0+4 0+6; 0+0 0+3; 0+3 0+1; 0+0 0+0; 0+1 0+2	
18	19	Poland Krzysztof Pływaczyk; Łukasz Szczurek; Łukasz Słonina; Rafał Lepel	LAP; 17:53.7; 21:29.1; 20:57.5; LAP	1+7 1+5; 0+0 0+0; 1+3 1+3; 0+2 0+0; 0+2 0+2	
DSQ	4	Russia ~~Alexey Volkov~~; ~~Evgeny Ustyugov~~; ~~Dmitry Malyshko~~; ~~Anton Shipulin~~	~~1:12:15.9~~; 17:19.5; 18:15.9; 18:04.8; 18:35.7	0+4 0+4; 0+1 0+1; 0+1 0+2; 0+0 0+1; 0+2 0+0	—
