= Ski jumping at the 2014 Winter Olympics – Qualification =

The following is about the qualification rules and the quota allocation for the ski jumping events at the 2014 Winter Olympics.

== Qualification rules ==
=== Quotas ===
The quotas will be allocated using the Olympic Quota Allocation List, which is calculated using the FIS World Cup standings and Continental Cup Standings from seasons 2012/13 and 2013/14 added together. The quotas will be distributed by assigning one quota place per athlete downwards on the list until the total of 60 male and 30 female competitors is reached (including the host nation quota). When a nation has received the maximum of 5 male quotas or four female quotas, its athletes won't count on the allocation list. After the 60 male and 30 female quotas are distributed, if there are less than 12 NOCs with at least four competitors allocated quota places, the next nation with three allocated quota places will be allocated an additional quota place. This will continue until there are 12 NOCs with four competitors. Any remaining quotas will be distributed until the quota limit of 70 is reached.

== Quota allocation ==
Final allocation as of February 3, 2014. Alexandra Pretorius of Canada withdrew due to injury and will be replaced by Gyda Enger of Norway.

=== Current summary ===
NOC	Athletes			Total
NOC	Men	Women	Men's team	Total
Austria	5	2	X	7
Bulgaria	1			1
Canada	4	~~3~~ 2	X	6
Czech Republic	5		X	5
Estonia	2			2
Finland	5	1	X	6
France	~~5~~ 1	3		4
Germany	5	4	X	9
Greece	1			1
Italy	~~4~~ 3	2		5
Japan	5	3	X	8
Kazakhstan	2			2
Norway	5	~~3~~ 4	X	9
Poland	5		X	5
Romania	1			1
Russia	5	1	X	6
Slovenia	5	4	X	9
South Korea	4		X	4
Switzerland	~~5~~ 2	1		3
United States	4	3	X	7
Total: 20 NOCs	70	30	12	100

=== Next eligible NOC per event ===
If a country rejects a quota spot then additional quotas become available. Countries in bold indicate that country received a rejected quota spot. Here are the top 10 eligible countries per event. Note: a country can be eligible for more than one quota spot per event in the reallocation process. Countries in bold have received a reallocation of a quota spot in the respective event, while countries with a strike have rejected their quota.

Men's	Women's
**South Korea**; **Canada**; **South Korea**; **Romania**; **Canada**; **Estonia**; **Greece**; ~~United States~~; **Kazakhstan**; Romania	**Norway**; United States; Japan; Netherlands; Czech Republic; Austria; Russia; Italy; China; Switzerland
