= Yuki Nakashima =

Yuki Nakashima may refer to:

- Yuki Nakashima (footballer)
- Yuki Nakashima (actress)

== See also ==
- Yuki Nakajima, Japanese biathlete
