= Miki Kobayashi =

Japanese biathlete (born 1987)

Personal information
- Nationality: Japanese
- Born: 10 November 1987 (age 37)

Sport
- Sport: Biathlon

Miki Kobayashi (小林美貴, Kobayashi Miki, born 10 November 1987) is a Japanese biathlete. She competed at the 2014 Winter Olympics in Sochi, in the individual, sprint and relay.
