= Song Na =

Chinese biathlete

Personal information
- Nationality: Chinese
- Born: 30 August 1995 (age 29); Heilongjiang, China

Sport
- Sport: Biathlon

Song Na (born 30 August 1995) is a Chinese biathlete. She was born in Heilongjiang. She competed at the 2014 Winter Olympics in Sochi, in the sprint and individual competitions.
