= Grete Gaim =

Estonian biathlete (born 1993)

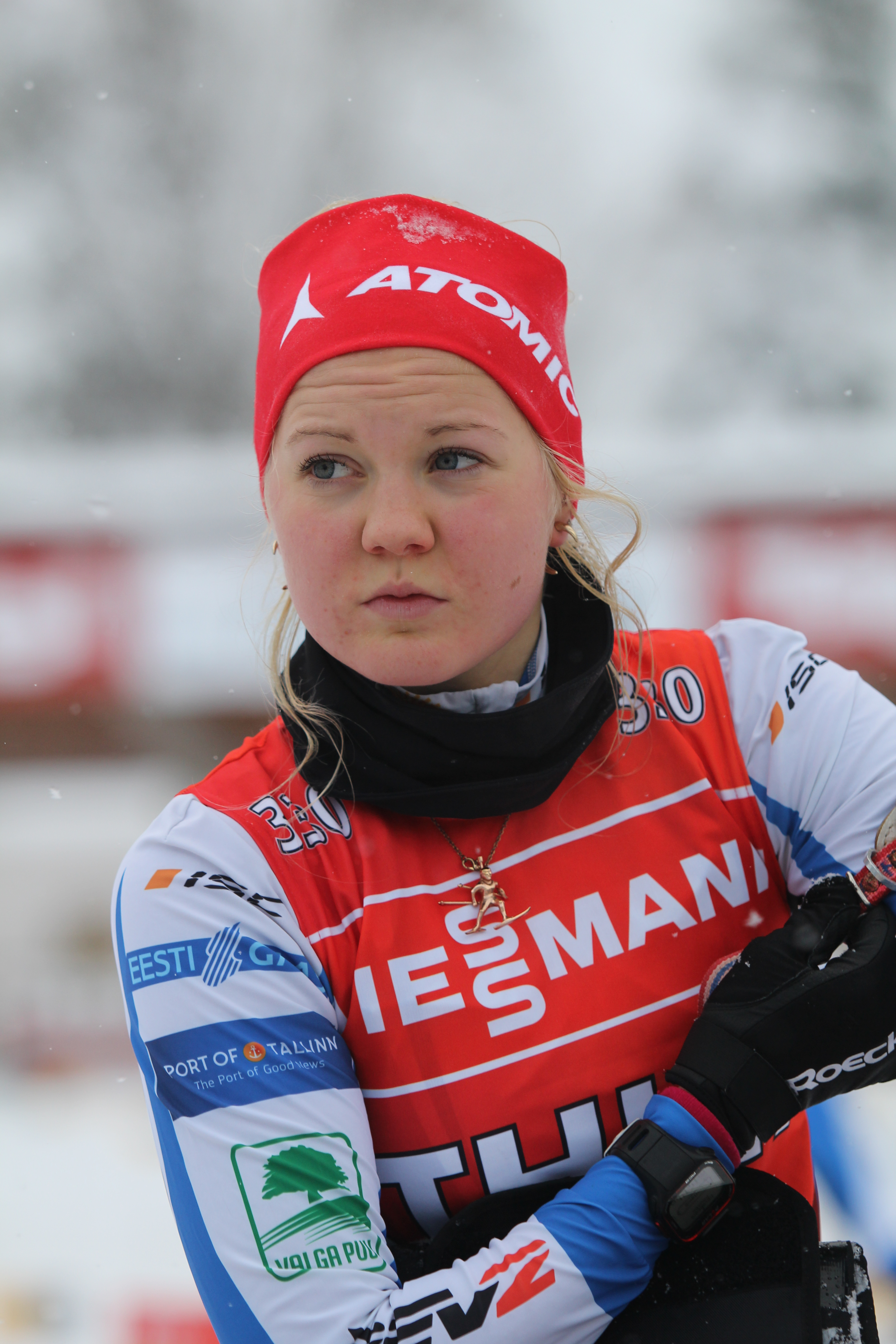

Personal information
- Nationality: Estonian
- Born: 21 May 1993 (age 33) Elva, Estonia

Sport
- Sport: Biathlon
Medal record
Youth World Championships
Gold medal – first place	2012 Kontiolahti	7.5 km pursuit

Grete Gaim (born 21 May 1993 in Elva) is an Estonian biathlete. She competed at the Biathlon World Championships 2013, and at the 2014 Winter Olympics in Sochi, in sprint and individual.

== Career ==
Grete Gaim made her international debut at the Biathlon Junior World Championship in 2010 in Torsby, where she placed 63rd in the individual and 48th in the sprint, not finishing the pursuit. In the relay, she was tenth. This was followed by the junior races of the European Championships in Otepää, where the she placed 45th in the individual, 34th in the sprint, and 42nd in the pursuit. A year later Gaim was at the Junior World Championships in Nové Město na Moravě 50th in the individual, 19th in the sprint, 18th in the pursuit and with Johanna Talihärm and Daria Yurlova 6th in relay competition. At the same place, she also took part in the junior races of the 2011 Summer Biathlon World Championships in the course of the year and came 18th in the sprint and 17th in the pursuit race.

At the start of the 2011/12 season, Gaim started in Östersund as part of the IBU Cup in her first races in the performance area and was 51st in the sprint. She was 81st in her first sprint. In Nové Město na Moravě she was able to achieve her best result so far in the highest racing series with a 75th place in the sprint. In the relay, a 14th place alongside Kristel Viigipuu, Daria Yurlova and Johanna Talihärm in Oberhof was the best result so far. The European Championships 2012 in Osrblie became their first international women's championship. Finishing 16th in the sprint, Gaim achieved one of the best placings by an Estonian biathlete in a top international race. She no longer competed in the pursuit race.

Her biggest achievement to date is the gold medal in the pursuit at the World Junior Championships, held in Kontiolahti, Finland in February 2012 . The win came as a surprise as she started the race 01:12 behind after the previous sprint in which she had finished tenth. At the start of the 2013/14 season she won in Östersund in a single as 39th World Cup points for the first time
