= Ivan Zlatev =

Bulgarian biathlete (born 1990)

Personal information
- Born: 1 August 1990 (age 35) Bansko, Bulgaria
- Height: 5 ft 10 in (178 cm)

Sport
- Sport: Skiing
- Updated on February 18, 2014

Ivan Zlatev (Bulgarian: Иван Златев) (born 1 August 1990) is a Bulgarian biathlete. He competed at the 2014 Winter Olympics in Sochi, in sprint and individual.
