= Rina Mitsuhashi =

Japanese biathlete (born 1990)

Rina Mitsuhashi, nee Suzuki (鈴木李奈, Suzuki Rina, born April 2, 1990) is a Japanese biathlete. She was born in Hokkaido. She competed at the 2014 Winter Olympics in Sochi, in the individual and sprint competitions.

== Biathlon results ==
All results are sourced from the International Biathlon Union.

=== Olympic Games ===
0 medals

Event	Individual	Sprint	Pursuit	Mass start	Relay	Mixed relay
(Russia) 2014 Sochi	DNF	80th	—	—	13th	—
(South Korea) 2018 Pyeongchang	—	85th	—	—	17th	—

=== World Championships ===
0 medals

Event	Individual	Sprint	Pursuit	Mass start	Relay	Mixed relay
(Norway) 2016 Oslo	57th	83rd	—	—	19th	—
(Austria) 2017 Hochfilzen	75th	92nd	—	—	—	—

*During Olympic seasons competitions are only held for those events not included in the Olympic program.
