= Ukraine at the 2014 Winter Olympics =

- IOC code: UKR
- NOC: National Olympic Committee of Ukraine
- Website: www.noc-ukr.org (in Ukrainian and English)

in Sochi
- Competitors: 43 (19 men, 24 women) in 9 sports
- Flag bearers: Valentina Shevchenko (opening); Vita Semerenko (closing)
- Medals Ranked 20th: Gold 1 Silver 0 Bronze 1 Total 2

Winter Olympics appearances (overview)
- 1994; 1998; 2002; 2006; 2010; 2014; 2018; 2022; 2026

Other related appearances
- Czechoslovakia (1924–1936); Poland (1924–1936); Romania (1924–1936); Soviet Union (1956–1988); Unified Team (1992)

Ukraine competed at the 2014 Winter Olympics in Sochi, Russia, from 7 to 23 February 2014. The National Olympic Committee of Ukraine sent a total of 43 athletes.

The women's relay victory gave Ukraine its second Winter Games gold medal ever. The first was won by Oksana Baiul at the 1994 Winter Olympics. On 22 February, cross-country skier Maryna Lisohor was excluded from the Olympics after testing positive for trimetazidine.

== Competitors ==
The following is the list of number of competitors participating at the Games per sport/discipline.

Sport	Men	Women	Total
Alpine skiing	1	1	2
Biathlon	5	6	11
Cross-country	2	6	8
Figure skating	3	3	6
Freestyle skiing	2	4	6
Luge	4	2	6
Nordic combined	1	0	1
Short track speed skating	0	1	1
Snowboarding	1	1	2
Total	19	24	43

== Medalists ==
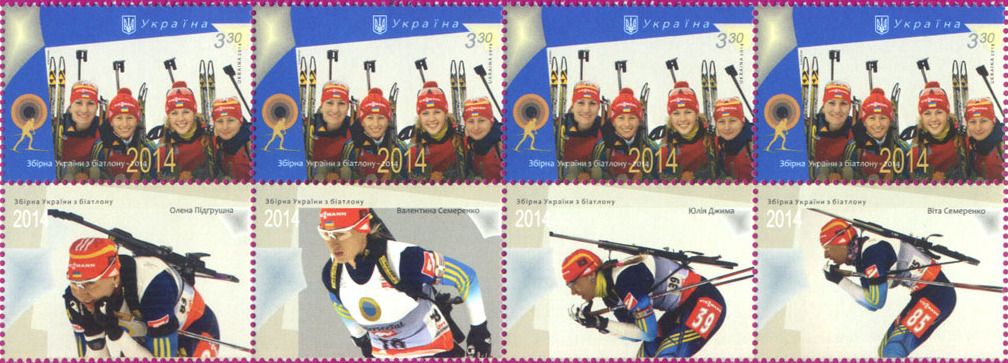
2014 Ukrainian stamp commemorating the gold medal

Medal	Name	Sport	Event	Date
Gold	Vita Semerenko; Juliya Dzhyma; Valj Semerenko; Olena Pidhrushna	Biathlon	Women's relay	21 February
Bronze	Vita Semerenko	Biathlon	Women's sprint	9 February

== Alpine skiing ==
Ukraine qualified 2 berths, one male and one female.

Athlete	Event	Run 1		Run 2		Total	
Athlete	Event	Time	Rank	Time	Rank	Time	Rank
Dmytro Mytsak	Men's giant slalom	1:34.22	67	1:37.18	64	3:11.40	60
Dmytro Mytsak	Men's slalom	1:01.57	72	DSQ			
Dmytro Mytsak	Men's super-G	—N/a				1:28.51	52
Bohdana Matsotska	Women's giant slalom	1:25.25	48	1:25.28	45	2:50.53	43
Bohdana Matsotska	Women's super-G	—N/a				1:31.58	27

== Biathlon ==
Based on their performance at the 2012 and 2013 Biathlon World Championships, Ukraine qualified 5 men and 6 women.

Men

Athlete	Event	Time	Misses	Rank
Andriy Deryzemlya	Sprint	25:29.0	1 (0+1)	22
Andriy Deryzemlya	Pursuit	36:21.5	3 (0+0+1+2)	36
Andriy Deryzemlya	Individual	54:40.0	3 (0+2+1+0)	46
Dmytro Pidruchnyi	Individual	55:53.4	3 (1+0+1+1)	55
Artem Pryma	Sprint	25:57.6	1 (0+1)	32
Artem Pryma	Pursuit	37:39.3	4 (0+1+2+1)	44
Artem Pryma	Individual	58:35.2	7 (3+1+0+3)	81
Serhiy Sednev	Sprint	26:16.8	1 (1+ 0)	44
Serhiy Sednev	Pursuit	39:33.8	3 (1+0+1+1)	54
Serhiy Semenov	Sprint	26:10.4	1 (1+0)	41
Serhiy Semenov	Pursuit	36:48.1	3 (0+2+1+0)	39
Serhiy Semenov	Individual	51:07.9	1 (1+0+0+0)	9
Andriy Deryzemlya; Dmytro Pidruchnyi; Artem Pryma; Serhiy Semenov	Team relay	1:14:21.1	7 (0+7)	9

Women

Athlete	Event	Time	Misses	Rank
Juliya Dzhyma	Sprint	22:55.5	3 (1+2)	42
Juliya Dzhyma	Pursuit	DNS		
Juliya Dzhyma	Individual	45:49.9	1 (0+1+0+0)	7
Juliya Dzhyma	Mass start	38:10.8	4 (0+0+2+2)	22
Olena Pidhrushna	Sprint	22:12.8	1 (0+1)	26
Olena Pidhrushna	Pursuit	31:54.2	1 (0+0+0+1)	22
Olena Pidhrushna	Individual	45:59.5	1 (0+0+0+1)	8
Olena Pidhrushna	Mass start	36:37.1	0 (0+0+0+0)	7
Valj Semerenko	Sprint	21:44.9	1 (0+1)	12
Valj Semerenko	Pursuit	30:23.6	1 (1+0+0+0)	5
Valj Semerenko	Individual	47:28.2	2 (1+0+1+0)	19
Valj Semerenko	Mass start	37:03.5	2 (0+0+2+0)	12
Vita Semerenko	Sprint	21:28.5	0 (0+0)	3rd place, bronze medalist(s)
Vita Semerenko	Pursuit	30:40.3	2 (0+1+1+0)	10
Vita Semerenko	Individual	48:29.2	3 (0+0+0+3)	29
Vita Semerenko	Mass start	37:16.1	1 (0+0+1+0)	16
Juliya Dzhyma; Olena Pidhrushna; Valj Semerenko; Vita Semerenko	Team relay	1:10:02.5	5 (0+5)	1st place, gold medalist(s)

Mixed

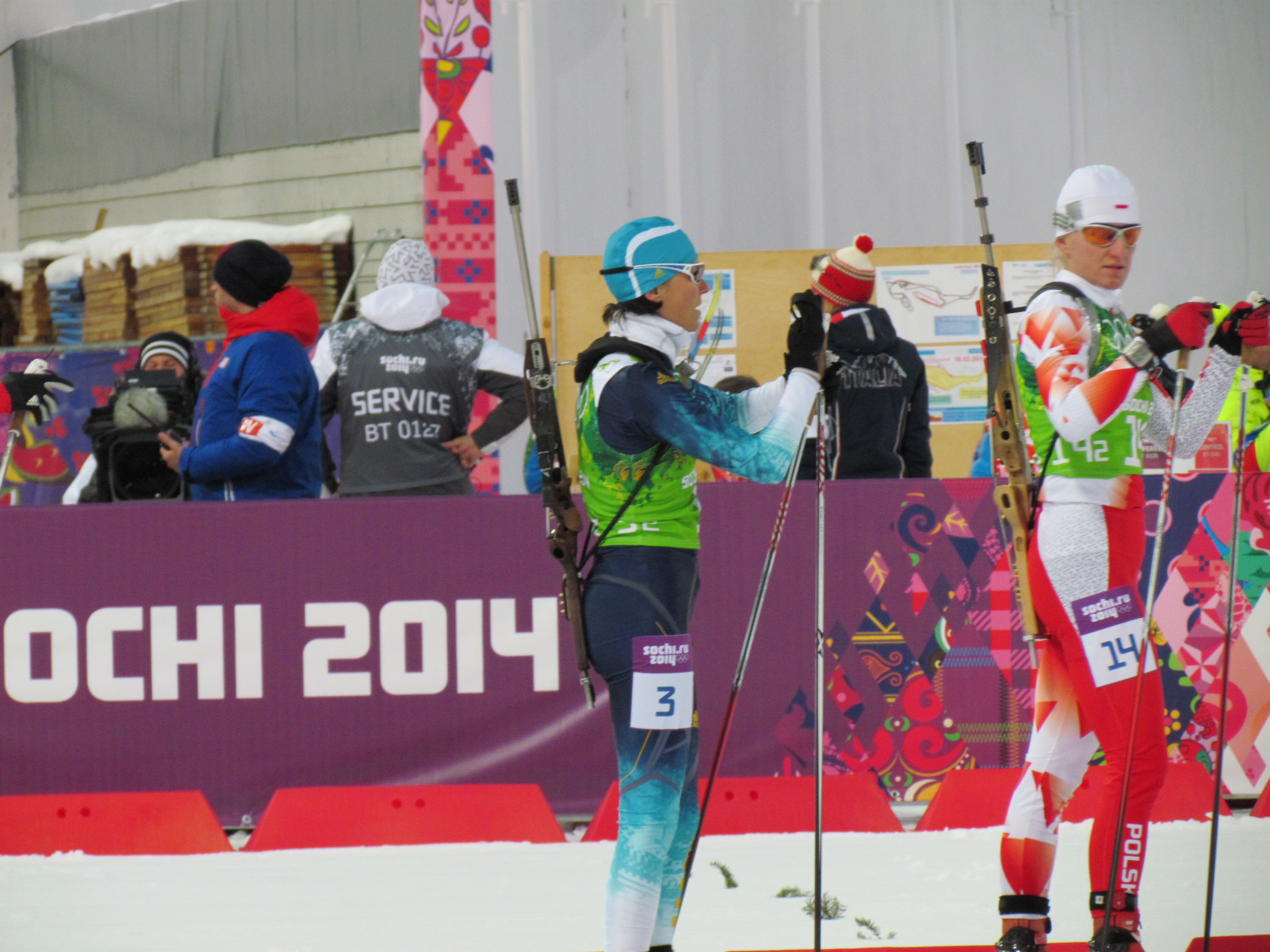
Mariya Panfilova (left)

Athlete	Event	Time	Misses	Rank
Natalya Burdyga; Mariya Panfilova; Andriy Deryzemlya; Serhiy Semenov	Team relay	1:12:05.2	9 (1+8)	7

== Cross-country skiing ==
Ukraine qualified 7 berths.

Distance
Men

Athlete	Event	Final		
Athlete	Event	Time	Deficit	Rank
Oleksii Krasovskyi	15 km classical	44:35.4	+6:05.7	69

Women

Athlete	Event	Classical		Freestyle		Final		
Athlete	Event	Time	Rank	Time	Rank	Time	Deficit	Rank
Maryna Antsybor	15 km skiathlon	21:06.1	49	21:01.9	44	42:42.5	+4:08.9	49
Maryna Antsybor	30 km freestyle	—N/a				1:16:22.7	+5:17.5	35
Tetyana Antypenko	10 km classical	—N/a				31:06.9	+2:49.1	28
Tetyana Antypenko	15 km skiathlon	21:19.5	51	21:41.6	52	43:40.3	+5:06.7	52
Kateryna Hryhorenko	10 km classical	—N/a				32:03.5	+3:45.7	46
Kateryna Hryhorenko	15 km skiathlon	21:11.6	50	21:01.2	43	42:47.2	+4:13.6	49
Kateryna Hryhorenko	30 km freestyle	—N/a				1:17:53.0	+6:47.8	38
Marina Lisogor	10 km classical	—N/a				33:35.4	+5:17.6	58
Valentina Shevchenko	10 km classical	—N/a				30:33.0	+2:15.2	22
Valentina Shevchenko	15 km skiathlon	20:17.0	34	20:00.6	18	40:50.7	+2:17.1	27
Valentina Shevchenko	30 km freestyle	—N/a				1:12:42.6	+1:37.4	14
Maryna Antsybor; Tetyana Antypenko; Kateryna Hryhorenko; Valentina Shevchenko	4×5 km relay	—N/a				56:56.1	+3:53.4	12

Sprint
Men

Athlete	Event	Qualification		Quarterfinal		Semifinal		Final	
Athlete	Event	Time	Rank	Time	Rank	Time	Rank	Time	Rank
Oleksii Krasovskyi	Sprint	4:35.08	81	did not advance					
Ruslan Perekhoda	Sprint	3:43.61	50	did not advance					
Oleksii Krasovskyi; Ruslan Perekhoda	Team sprint	—N/a				25:31.13	11	did not advance	

Women

Athlete	Event	Qualification		Quarterfinal		Semifinal		Final	
Athlete	Event	Time	Rank	Time	Rank	Time	Rank	Time	Rank
Maryna Antsybor	Sprint	2:40.55	34	did not advance					
Marina Lisogor	Sprint	2:53.22	58	did not advance					
Kateryna Serdyuk	Sprint	2:44.12	45	did not advance					
Marina Lisogor; Kateryna Serdyuk	Team sprint	—N/a				DNS		did not advance	

According to press reports Lisogor and Serdyuk had refused to start because they had been denied to wear black arm bands to honor those killed in the violent clashes Ukraine's capital Kyiv the previous day. The National Olympic Committee of Ukraine claimed Serdyuk was injured.

== Figure skating ==
Ukraine has achieved the following quota places:

Athlete	Event	SP/OD		FS/FD		Total	
Athlete	Event	Points	Rank	Points	Rank	Points	Rank
Yakov Godorozha	Men's singles	62.65	21 Q	119.54	19	182.19	20
Natalia Popova	Ladies' singles	47.42	27	did not advance			
Julia Lavrentieva / Yuri Rudyk	Pairs	48.45	20	did not advance			
Siobhan Heekin-Canedy / Dmitri Dun	Ice dancing	41.90	24	did not advance			

Team trophy

Athlete	Event	Short program/Short dance						Free skate/Free dance					
Athlete	Event	Men's	Ladies'	Pairs	Ice dance	Total		Men's	Ladies'	Pairs	Ice dance	Total	
Athlete	Event	Points Team points	Points Team points	Points Team points	Points Team points	Points	Rank	Points Team points	Points Team points	Points Team points	Points Team points	Points	Rank
Yakov Godorozha (M); Natalia Popova (L); Julia Lavrentieva / Yuri Rudyk (P); Siobhan Heekin-Canedy / Dmitri Dun (I)	Team trophy	60.51; 3	53.44; 3	46.34; 2	49.19; 2	10	9	did not advance					

== Freestyle skiing ==
Ukraine qualified 7 berths, three male and four female (all aerial).

Aerials

Athlete	Event	Qualification				Final					
Athlete	Event	Jump 1		Jump 2		Jump 1		Jump 2		Jump 3	
Athlete	Event	Points	Rank	Points	Rank	Points	Rank	Points	Rank	Points	Rank
Oleksandr Abramenko	Men's aerials	109.50	6 Q	BYE		119.03	3 Q	113.12	6	did not advance	
Mykola Puzderko	Men's aerials	98.41	12	77.88	14	did not advance					
Nadiya Didenko	Women's aerials	DNS				did not advance					
Olga Polyuk	Women's aerials	70.76	12	74.97	9	did not advance					
Anastasiya Novosad	Women's aerials	56.84	18	74.34	10	did not advance					
Nadiya Mokhnatska	Women's aerials	52.44	19	69.31	11	did not advance					

== Luge ==
Ukraine has qualified a total of six athletes and a spot in the team relay.

Athlete	Event	Run 1		Run 2		Run 3		Run 4		Total	
Athlete	Event	Time	Rank	Time	Rank	Time	Rank	Time	Rank	Time	Rank
Andriy Kis	Men's singles	53.533	30	53.358	28	53.046	29	52.859	28	3:32.796	28
Andriy Mandziy	Men's singles	53.653	33	53.660	32	53.227	32	53.062	30	3:33.602	31
Oleksandr Obolonchyk; Roman Zakharkiv	Men's doubles	51.795	19	51.233	16	—N/a				1:43.028	17
Olena Shkhumova	Women's singles	51.211	18	51.092	19	51.128	17	1:01:416	31	3:34.847	31
Olena Stetskiv	Women's singles	52.064	28	51.553	26	51.991	28	51.889	26	3:27.497	26
Andriy Kis; Oleksandr Obolonchyk; Olena Shkhumova; Roman Zakharkiv	Mixed team relay	55.671	10	56.882	10	58.502	12	—N/a		2:51.055	11

== Nordic combined ==
Ukraine qualified one male athlete.

Athlete	Event	Ski jumping			Cross-country		Total	
Athlete	Event	Distance	Points	Rank	Time	Rank	Time	Rank
Viktor Pasichnyk	Normal hill/10 km	95.0	112.1	27	26:13.5	42	27:31.5	42
Viktor Pasichnyk	Large hill/10 km	122.5	104.6	20	23:59.6	31	25:37.6	30

== Short track speed skating ==
Ukraine qualified 1 woman in the 1000 m for the Olympics during World Cup 3 and 4 in November 2013.

Women

Athlete	Event	Heat		Quarterfinal		Semifinal		Final	
Athlete	Event	Time	Rank	Time	Rank	Time	Rank	Time	Rank
Sofiya Vlasova	1000 m	1:32.495	4	did not advance					26

Qualification legend: ADV – Advanced due to being impeded by another skater; FA – Qualify to medal round; FB – Qualify to consolation round

== Snowboarding ==
Ukraine qualified 2 berths, one male and one female (all parallel).

Alpine

Athlete	Event	Qualification		Round of 16	Quarterfinal	Semifinal	Final	
Athlete	Event	Time	Rank	Opposition Time	Opposition Time	Opposition Time	Opposition Time	Rank
Yosyf Penyak	Men's giant slalom	1:41.14	23	did not advance				
Yosyf Penyak	Men's slalom	1:00.17	19	did not advance				
Annamari Chundak	Women's giant slalom	1:53.71	21	did not advance				
Annamari Chundak	Women's slalom	1:05.76	21	did not advance				

== Concerns and controversies ==
On 19 February 2014, Ukrainian athletes asked for and were refused permission by the International Olympic Committee (IOC) to wear black armbands to honour those killed in the violent clashes in Ukraine's capital Kyiv on the previous day. According to IOC spokesman Mark Adams, "They weren't forbidden to wear armbands. The Ukrainian NOC met with IOC officials informally yesterday. They discussed what should be done, and they reached the conclusion there were other ways of marking this moment. Some athletes have taken other views and other ways of doing things". IOC president Thomas Bach offered his condolences "to those who have lost loved ones in these tragic events".

Alpine skier Bohdana Matsotska refused to participate further at the Olympic Games in protest against the violence. She and her father posted a message on Facebook stating, "In solidarity with the fighters on the barricades of the Maidan, and as a protest against the criminal actions made towards the protesters, the irresponsibility of the president and his issues with the government, we refuse further performance at the Olympic Games in Sochi 2014". Matsotska was reportedly followed by about thirty Ukrainian athletes who left Sochi and returned to their country (mostly after having competed), leaving a dozen present at the Games.

On 20 February 2014, the Ukrainian NOC reported that as many as half of the Ukrainian athletes at the Olympics had left the games to return home. But according to Ukrainian NOC president Serhiy Bubka they had returned home in compliance with their original schedule, and their departure was thus not related to the riots in Kyiv. According to Bubka, the remaining athletes did plan to participate in the closing ceremony. In a statement on 20 February 2014, the Ukrainian team had expressed condolences for the dead and stated, "We are thinking about our families and loved ones back home in Ukraine, and we are doing our best to honour them on the fields of play here in Sochi. We appeal for peace and mutual understanding to find a positive way forward for Ukraine".

Figure skater Natalia Popova stated after finishing her figure skating short program on 20 February, "That’s very unfortunate because you just want peace everywhere. But all I can do is just focus on my performance and, hopefully, my skating can inspire the people back in Ukraine to be more peaceful with each other". Olympic biathlete Olena Pidhrushna at a news conference after her women's relay victory asked for a minute's silence in memory of the people who died in Kyiv.

== See also ==
- Ukraine at the 2014 Summer Youth Olympics
