= Biathlon at the 2014 Winter Olympics – Men's sprint =

Men's sprint at the XXII Olympic Winter Games
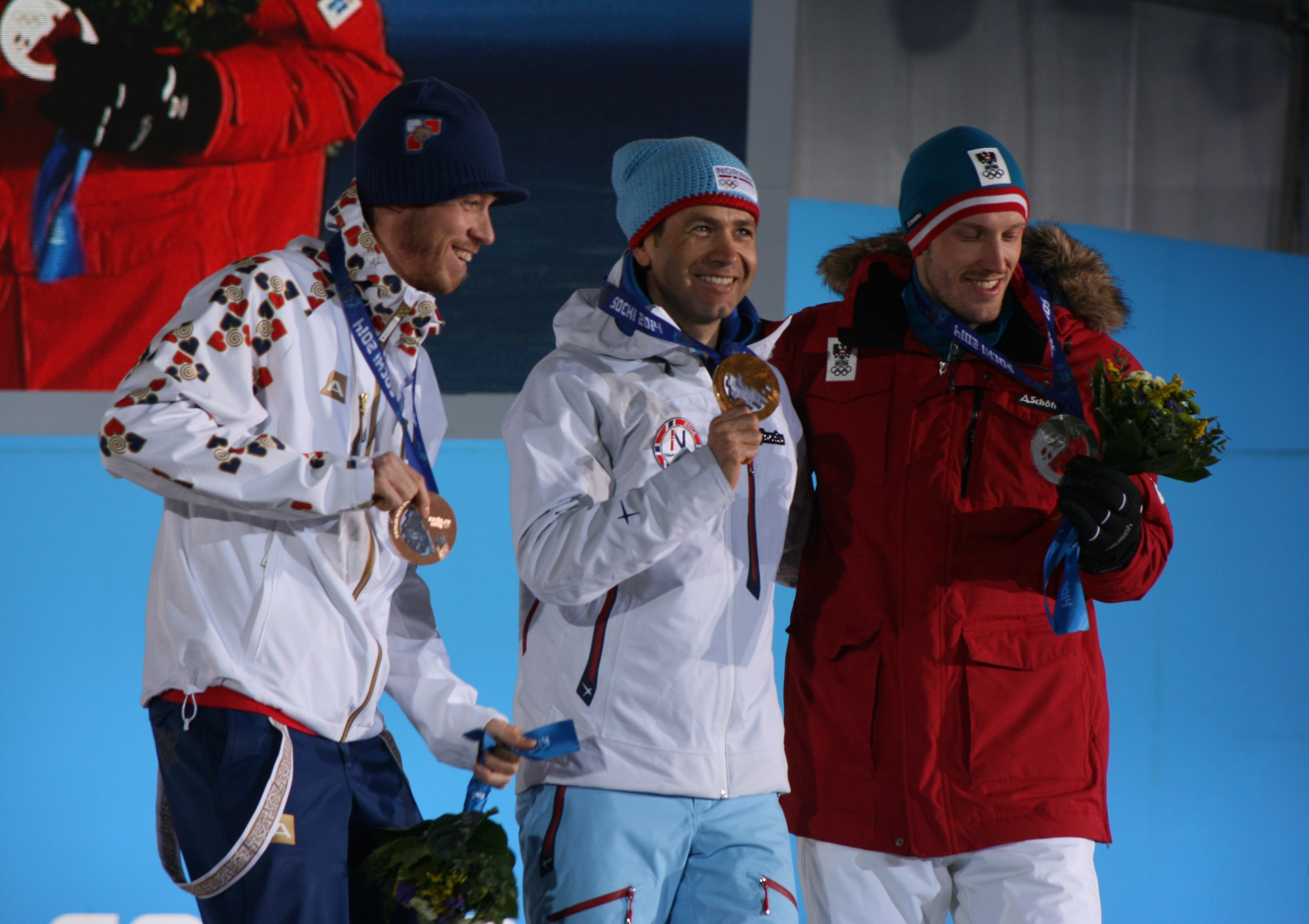
- Medalists
- Venue: Laura Biathlon & Ski Complex
- Date: 8 February 2014
- Competitors: 87 from 31 nations
- Winning time: 24:33.5

Medalists
1st place, gold medalist(s)		Ole Einar Bjørndalen	Norway
2nd place, silver medalist(s)		Dominik Landertinger	Austria
3rd place, bronze medalist(s)		Jaroslav Soukup	Czech Republic

The men's sprint competition of the Sochi 2014 Olympics was held at Laura Biathlon & Ski Complex on 8 February 2014. It was 10 kilometres in length (6.2 miles).

The defending Olympic Champion was Vincent Jay of France, who has retired since the previous Olympics. The defending World Champion is Emil Hegle Svendsen of Norway.

== Qualification ==
Countries were assigned quotas using a combination of the Nation Cup scores of their top 3 athletes in the individual, sprint, and relay competitions at the 2012 World Championships in Ruhpolding, Germany, and the 2013 World Championships in Nové Město na Moravě, Czech Republic. The top 20 nations would be able to start four athletes in the sprint, while nations 21 through 28 could start one each. Nations below 28 could only start if any nation decided to vacate a quota spot.

During the 2012–13 or 2013–14 Biathlon World Cup season the athlete must have two results at IBU Cup, Open European Championships, World Championships or World Cup in the Sprint or Individual that at a maximum 20% behind the average time of the top three athletes. Or, two placings in the top half at the Junior World Championships. They also can have a combination of both criteria (one of each).

== Schedule ==
All dates and times are (UTC+4).

Date	Time	Round
8 February	18:30–20:20	Final

== Results ==
The race was started at 18:30.

Ole Einar Bjørndalen won the event with a time of 24:33.5, 1.3 seconds ahead of silver medalist Dominik Landertinger. Bjørndalen missed one of the targets but was able to use his speed to make up the lost time. Jaroslav Soukup finished third for the bronze medal.

The gold medal was Bjørndalen's 12th Olympic medal, equaling a record set by fellow Norwegian Bjørn Dæhlie. At 40 years old, he is also the oldest man ever to win an Olympic gold medal in an individual event at the Winter Games. Bjørndalen won his 3rd gold medal in the Olympic men's sprint.

Rank	Bib	Name	Country	Time	Penalties (P+S)	Deficit
1st place, gold medalist(s)	24	Ole Einar Bjørndalen	Norway	24:33.5	1 (0+1)	—
2nd place, silver medalist(s)	15	Dominik Landertinger	Austria	24:34.8	0 (0+0)	+1.3
3rd place, bronze medalist(s)	40	Jaroslav Soukup	Czech Republic	24:39.2	0 (0+0)	+5.7
4	48	Anton Shipulin	Russia	24:39.9	1 (0+1)	+6.4
5	65	Jean-Philippe Leguellec	Canada	24:43.2	0 (0+0)	+9.7
6	39	Martin Fourcade	France	24:45.9	1 (1+0)	+12.4
7	30	Simon Eder	Austria	24:47.2	0 (0+0)	+13.7
8	6	Ondřej Moravec	Czech Republic	24:48.1	0 (0+0)	+14.6
9	29	Emil Hegle Svendsen	Norway	25:02.8	1 (0+1)	+29.3
10	72	Jakov Fak	Slovenia	25:06.5	0 (0+0)	+33.0
11	37	Dominik Windisch	Italy	25:07.6	1 (1+0)	+34.1
12	75	Lukas Hofer	Italy	25:08.8	1 (0+1)	+35.3
13	1	Nathan Smith	Canada	25:09.7	0 (0+0)	+36.2
14	57	Jean-Guillaume Béatrix	France	25:12.1	1 (1+0)	+38.6
15	55	Simon Schempp	Germany	25:16.4	0 (0+0)	+42.9
16	8	Evgeny Ustyugov	Russia	~~25:19.1~~ DSQ	1 (1+0)	+45.6
17	35	Andrejs Rastorgujevs	Latvia	25:20.2	1 (1+0)	+46.7
18	2	Fredrik Lindström	Sweden	25:21.0	0 (0+0)	+47.5
19	43	Tim Burke	United States	25:23.3	1 (0+1)	+49.8
20	32	Christoph Sumann	Austria	25:25.5	0 (0+0)	+52.0
21	62	Erik Lesser	Germany	25:26.7	1 (0+1)	+53.2
22	31	Andriy Deryzemlya	Ukraine	25:29.0	1 (0+1)	+55.5
23	51	Brendan Green	Canada	25:31.7	1 (1+0)	+58.2
24	70	Carl Johan Bergman	Sweden	25:35.9	1 (0+1)	+1:02.4
25	36	Björn Ferry	Sweden	25:36.4	2 (2+0)	+1:02.9
26	54	Klemen Bauer	Slovenia	25:40.7	2 (1+1)	+1:07.2
27	68	Evgeniy Garanichev	Russia	25:43.0	1 (0+1)	+1:09.5
28	46	Dmitry Malyshko	Russia	25:48.5	0 (0+0)	+1:15.0
29	19	Vladimir Chepelin	Belarus	25:49.7	1 (0+1)	+1:16.2
30	13	Cornel Puchianu	Romania	25:50.7	0 (0+0)	+1:17.2
31	27	Michal Šlesingr	Czech Republic	25:51.7	1 (1+0)	+1:18.2
32	77	Artem Pryma	Ukraine	25:57.6	1 (0+1)	+1:24.1
33	50	Sergey Novikov	Belarus	26:00.8	0 (0+0)	+1:27.3
34	38	Arnd Peiffer	Germany	26:01.2	3 (2+1)	+1:27.7
35	26	Lowell Bailey	United States	26:04.1	2 (1+1)	+1:30.6
36	64	Simon Fourcade	France	26:04.2	2 (1+1)	+1:30.7
37	21	Matej Kazár	Slovakia	26:04.8	3 (2+1)	+1:31.3
38	69	Daniel Mesotitsch	Austria	26:06.6	2 (0+2)	+1:33.1
39	52	Tarjei Bø	Norway	26:10.1	3 (0+3)	+1:36.6
40	14	Serafin Wiestner	Switzerland	26:10.2	2 (1+1)	+1:36.7
41	67	Serhiy Semenov	Ukraine	26:10.4	1 (1+0)	+1:36.9
42	82	Tobias Arwidson	Sweden	26:11.8	1 (1+0)	+1:38.3
43	16	Yan Savitskiy	Kazakhstan	26:13.0	1 (1+0)	+1:39.5
44	18	Serhiy Sednev	Ukraine	26:16.8	1 (1+0)	+1:43.3
45	73	Leif Nordgren	United States	26:17.4	0 (0+0)	+1:43.9
46	3	Simon Desthieux	France	26:18.2	2 (0+2)	+1:44.7
47	81	Christian De Lorenzi	Italy	26:25.4	2 (1+1)	+1:51.9
48	4	Tomas Kaukėnas	Lithuania	26:26.2	2 (0+2)	+1:52.7
49	45	Krasimir Anev	Bulgaria	26:28.0	3 (3+0)	+1:54.5
50	44	Daniil Steptšenko	Estonia	26:40.5	2 (1+1)	+2:07.0
51	86	Janez Marič	Slovenia	26:41.3	1 (0+1)	+2:07.8
52	56	Pavol Hurajt	Slovakia	26:45.8	0 (0+0)	+2:12.3
53	66	Indrek Tobreluts	Estonia	26:46.5	3 (0+3)	+2:13.0
54	5	Kauri Kõiv	Estonia	26:47.1	3 (2+1)	+2:13.6
55	34	Johannes Thingnes Bø	Norway	26:51.0	4 (2+2)	+2:17.5
56	61	Evgeny Abramenko	Belarus	26:55.0	2 (1+1)	+2:21.5
57	80	Yuryi Liadov	Belarus	26:55.1	2 (1+1)	+2:21.6
58	11	Christoph Stephan	Germany	26:55.4	2 (1+1)	+2:21.9
59	71	Sergey Naumik	Kazakhstan	26:55.5	1 (0+1)	+2:22.0
60	59	Vladimir Iliev	Bulgaria	26:55.9	4 (2+2)	+2:22.4
61	87	Russell Currier	United States	26:58.5	4 (4+0)	+2:25.0
62	58	Ahti Toivanen	Finland	26:58.6	2 (1+1)	+2:25.1
63	41	Benjamin Weger	Switzerland	27:00.5	1 (1+0)	+2:27.0
64	17	Krzysztof Pływaczyk	Poland	27:02.3	1 (0+1)	+2:28.8
65	74	Tomáš Hasilla	Slovakia	27:05.4	3 (2+1)	+2:31.9
66	76	Roland Lessing	Estonia	27:06.3	3 (0+3)	+2:32.8
67	42	Lee-Steve Jackson	Great Britain	27:07.5	1 (0+1)	+2:34.0
68	83	Martin Otčenáš	Slovakia	27:07.8	3 (1+2)	+2:34.3
69	20	Milanko Petrović	Serbia	27:08.2	3 (1+2)	+2:34.7
70	12	Michail Kletcherov	Bulgaria	27:13.6	2 (1+1)	+2:40.1
71	28	Hidenori Isa	Japan	27:15.2	3 (1+2)	+2:41.7
72	25	Peter Dokl	Slovenia	27:20.1	1 (1+0)	+2:46.6
73	33	Alexei Almoukov	Australia	27:24.6	2 (0+2)	+2:51.1
74	78	Scott Perras	Canada	27:32.1	3 (2+1)	+2:58.6
75	63	Tomáš Krupčík	Czech Republic	27:39.3	2 (1+1)	+3:05.8
76	85	Ivan Zlatev	Bulgaria	27:48.5	2 (1+1)	+3:15.0
77	53	Łukasz Szczurek	Poland	27:57.2	2 (2+0)	+3:23.7
78	7	Jarkko Kauppinen	Finland	27:57.8	3 (2+1)	+3:24.3
79	47	Károly Gombos	Hungary	28:04.3	1 (0+1)	+3:30.8
80	49	Anton Pantov	Kazakhstan	28:05.0	4 (2+2)	+3:31.5
81	23	Markus Windisch	Italy	28:14.4	2 (1+1)	+3:40.9
82	22	Lee In-Bok	South Korea	28:35.9	1 (0+1)	+4:02.4
83	10	Ren Long	China	28:53.2	4 (0+4)	+4:19.7
84	9	Victor Lobo Escolar	Spain	28:53.3	4 (4+0)	+4:19.8
85	60	Grzegorz Guzik	Poland	29:17.2	5 (4+1)	+4:43.7
86	84	Rafał Lepel	Poland	29:25.8	2 (1+1)	+4:52.3
87	79	Dias Keneshev	Kazakhstan	30:06.8	4 (2+2)	+5:33.3
