= Kazakhstan at the 2014 Winter Olympics =

- IOC code: KAZ
- NOC: National Olympic Committee of the Republic of Kazakhstan
- Website: www.olympic.kz (in Kazakh, Russian, and English)

in Sochi
- Competitors: 52 in 10 sports
- Flag bearers: Yerdos Akhmadiyev (opening and closing)
- Medals Ranked 26th: Gold 0 Silver 0 Bronze 1 Total 1

Winter Olympics appearances (overview)
- 1994; 1998; 2002; 2006; 2010; 2014; 2018; 2022; 2026

Other related appearances
- Soviet Union (1956–1988); Unified Team (1992)

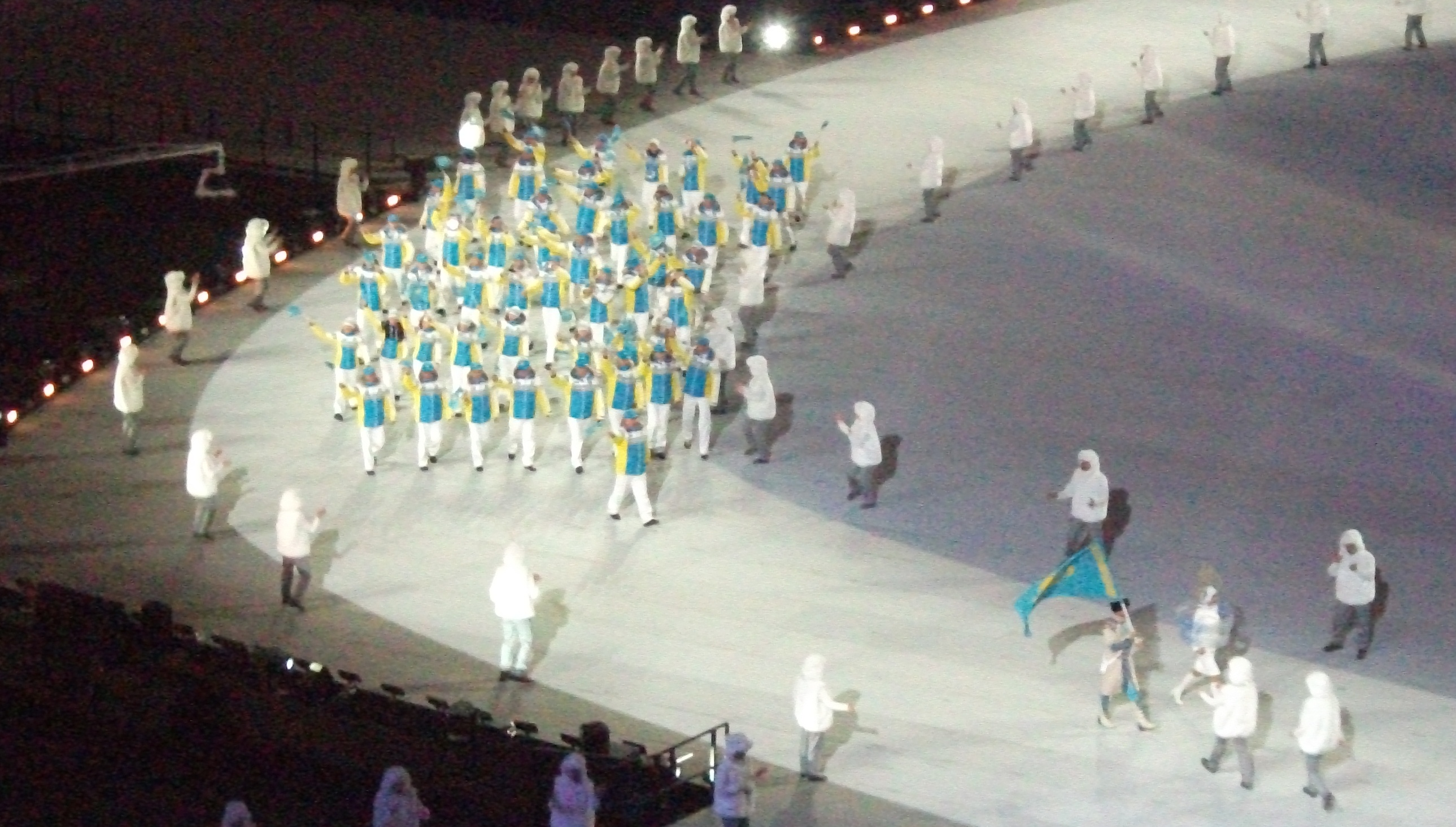
Team Kazakhstan at the Opening Ceremony.

Kazakhstan competed at the 2014 Winter Olympics in Sochi, Russia, from 7 to 23 February 2014. Kazakhstan's team consisted of 52 athletes competing in 11 sports, an increase of 14 athletes from four years prior.

== Medalists ==
Medal	Name	Sport	Event	Date
Bronze	Denis Ten	Figure skating	Men's singles	14 February

== Alpine skiing ==
According to the final quota allocation released on 20 January 2014, Kazakhstan had four athletes in qualification position. Lyudmila Fedotova was selected to compete but she did not participate in any of her scheduled events.

Athlete	Event	Run 1		Run 2		Total	
Athlete	Event	Time	Rank	Time	Rank	Time	Rank
Martin Khuber	Men's downhill	—				2:13.51	42
Martin Khuber	Men's super-G	—				1:22.60	41
Martin Khuber	Men's combined	1:59.42	42	1:00.44	31	2:59.86	33
Dmitriy Koshkin	Men's downhill	—				2:14.63	43
Dmitriy Koshkin	Men's super-G	—				1:21.50	30
Igor Zakurdayev	Men's downhill	—				2:11.28	33
Igor Zakurdayev	Men's super-G	—				1:23.13	45
Igor Zakurdayev	Men's combined	1:57.62	37	57.02	29	2:54.64	26

== Biathlon ==
Based on their performance at the 2012 and 2013 Biathlon World Championships, Kazakhstan qualified 5 men and 5 women.

Men

Athlete	Event	Time	Misses	Rank
Dias Keneshev	Sprint	30:06.8	4 (2+2)	87
Sergey Naumik	Sprint	26:55.5	1 (0+1)	59
Sergey Naumik	Individual	58:03.2	5 (0+1+2+2)	76
Sergey Naumik	Pursuit	40:06.5	4 (1+0+2+1)	58
Anton Pantov	Sprint	28:05.0	4 (2+2)	80
Anton Pantov	Individual	52:51.5	0 (0+0+0+0)	27
Yan Savitskiy	Sprint	26:13.0	1 (1+0)	43
Yan Savitskiy	Pursuit	35:57.0	1 (0+1+0+0)	29
Yan Savitskiy	Individual	52:00.0	1 (0+1+0+0)	20
Alexandr Trifonov	Individual	1:00:08.9	5 (1+1+2+1)	85
Dias Keneshev; Sergey Naumik; Anton Pantov; Alexandr Trifonov	Team relay	LAP	10 (0+10)	18

Women

Athlete	Event	Time	Misses	Rank
Elena Khrustaleva	Sprint	23:29.6	2 (2+0)	57
Elena Khrustaleva	Pursuit	33:06.5	0 (0+0+0+0)	37
Elena Khrustaleva	Individual	50:00.1	3 (2+1+0+0)	47
Marina Lebedeva	Sprint	24:31.9	2 (1+1)	73
Alina Raikova	Individual	53:15.6	3 (1+0+1+1)	65
Darya Usanova	Sprint	23:33.3	1 (1+0)	58
Darya Usanova	Pursuit	33:54.6	2 (1+0+0+1)	41
Darya Usanova	Individual	49:13.5	2 (1+0+0+1)	40
Galina Vishnevskaya	Sprint	23:52.0	3 (2+1)	64
Galina Vishnevskaya	Individual	49:26.9	2 (1+1+0+0)	41
Elena Khrustaleva; Marina Lebedeva; Darya Usanova; Galina Vishnevskaya	Team relay	1:15:54.7	13 (0+13)	12

Mixed

Athlete	Event	Time	Misses	Rank
Elena Khrustaleva; Anton Pantov; Yan Savitskiy; Darya Usanova	Team relay	1:15:46.4	6 (0+6)	14

== Cross-country skiing ==
According to the final quota allocation released on 20 January 2014, Kazakhstan had eleven athletes in qualification position.

Distance
Men

Athlete	Event	Classical		Freestyle		Final		
Athlete	Event	Time	Rank	Time	Rank	Time	Deficit	Rank
Yerdos Akhmadiyev	15 km classical	—				43:02.2	+4:32.5	54
Yerdos Akhmadiyev	50 km freestyle	—				1:53:07.4	+6:12.2	48
Nikolay Chebotko	15 km classical	—				41:14.1	+2:44.4	33
Sergey Cherepanov	30 km skiathlon	37:36.8	43	35:26.4	55	1:13:39.7	+5:24.3	49
Sergey Cherepanov	50 km freestyle	—				1:57:24.2	+10:29.0	54
Alexey Poltoranin	15 km classical	—				39:43.2	+1:13.5	9
Alexey Poltoranin	30 km skiathlon	36:01.5	6	32:17.7	16	1:08:51.5	+36.1	16
Mark Starostin	30 km skiathlon	38:57.8	54	36:03.8	56	1:15:36.6	+7:21.2	56
Mark Starostin	50 km freestyle	—				1:49:34.1	+2:38.9	33
Yevgeniy Velichko	15 km classical	—				41:16.4	+2:46.7	34
Yevgeniy Velichko	30 km skiathlon	36:53.8	30	33:37.0	35	1:11:05.6	+2:50.2	32
Yevgeniy Velichko	50 km freestyle	—				1:58:10.6	+11:15.4	55
Sergey Cherepanov; Mark Starostin; Yevgeniy Velichko; Denis Volotka	4×10 km relay	—				1:34:11.9	+5:29.9	13

Women

Athlete	Event	Classical		Freestyle		Final		
Athlete	Event	Time	Rank	Time	Rank	Time	Deficit	Rank
Yelena Kolomina	10 km classical	—				31:20.1	+3:02.3	33
Yelena Kolomina	15 km skiathlon	20:27.8	41	20:44.5	38	41:52.2	+3:18.6	40
Yelena Kolomina	30 km freestyle	—				1:21:50.0	+10:44.8	48
Tatyana Ossipova	10 km classical	—				32:20.1	+4:02.3	49
Tatyana Ossipova	15 km skiathlon	21:31.3	53	22:15.9	58	44:29.0	+5:55.4	57
Tatyana Ossipova	30 km freestyle	—				1:23:52.6	+12:47.4	51
Anastassiya Slonova	10 km classical	—				31:56.6	+3:38.8	43
Anastassiya Slonova	15 km skiathlon	20:40.3	43	20:31.8	35	41:52.8	+3:19.2	41

Sprint
Men

Athlete	Event	Qualification		Quarterfinal		Semifinal		Final	
Athlete	Event	Time	Rank	Time	Rank	Time	Rank	Time	Rank
Nikolay Chebotko	Sprint	3:37.88	30 Q	3:39.66	5	did not advance			
Roman Ragozin	Sprint	3:38.56	33	did not advance					
Denis Volotka	Sprint	3:46.92	58	did not advance					
Nikolay Chebotko; Alexey Poltoranin	Team sprint	—				23:28.50	4 q	24:01.38	8

Women

Athlete	Event	Qualification		Quarterfinal		Semifinal		Final	
Athlete	Event	Time	Rank	Time	Rank	Time	Rank	Time	Rank
Yelena Kolomina	Sprint	2:46.37	46	did not advance					
Tatyana Ossipova	Sprint	2:51.44	57	did not advance					
Yelena Kolomina; Anastassiya Slonova	Team sprint	—				17:49.66	6	did not advance	

== Figure skating ==
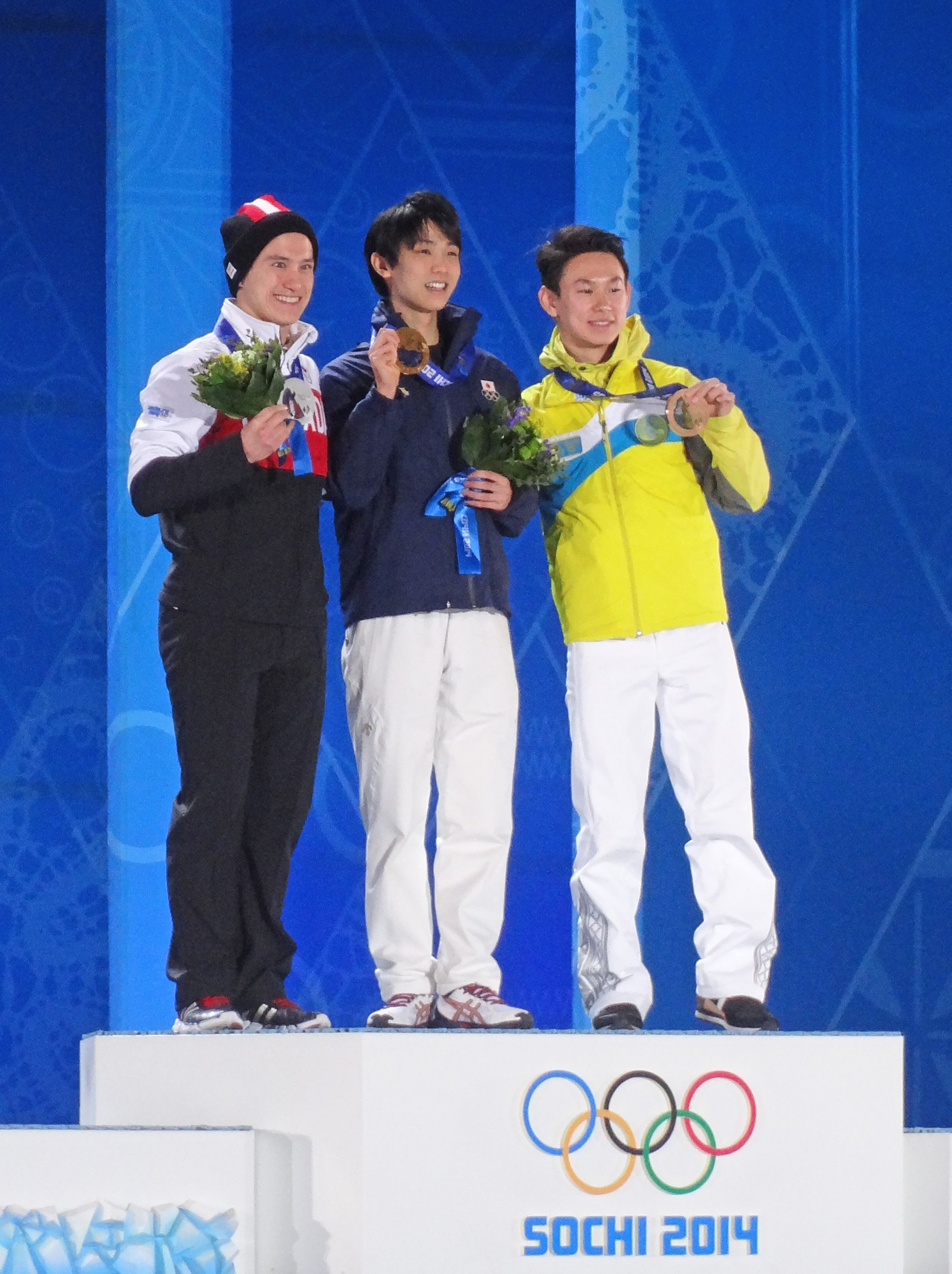
Denis Ten won bronze in the men's singles

By finishing with the silver medal at the 2013 World Figure Skating Championships, Denis Ten managed to qualify two skaters for Kazakhstan. In 2018, Ten was stabbed to death in Almaty by two carjackers.

Athlete	Event	SP		FS		Total	
Athlete	Event	Points	Rank	Points	Rank	Points	Rank
Abzal Rakimgaliev	Men's singles	64.18	20 Q	110.22	22	174.40	22
Denis Ten	Men's singles	84.06	9 Q	171.04	3	255.10	3rd place, bronze medalist(s)

== Freestyle skiing ==
Aerials

Athlete	Event	Qualification				Final					
Athlete	Event	Jump 1		Jump 2		Jump 1		Jump 2		Jump 3	
Athlete	Event	Points	Rank	Points	Rank	Points	Rank	Points	Rank	Points	Rank
Sergey Berestovskiy	Men's aerials	82.84	16	85.30	11	did not advance					
Baglan Inkarbek	Men's aerials	60.16	20	79.31	13	did not advance					
Zhanbota Aldabergenova	Women's aerials	74.82	9	78.12	5 Q	76.23	8 Q	68.44	6	did not advance	
Zhibek Arapbayeva	Women's aerials	63.44	16	58.87	13	did not advance					

Moguls

Athlete	Event	Qualification								Final											
Athlete	Event	Run 1				Run 2				Run 1				Run 2				Run 3			
Athlete	Event	Time	Points	Total	Rank	Time	Points	Total	Rank	Time	Points	Total	Rank	Time	Points	Total	Rank	Time	Points	Total	Rank
Dmitriy Barmashov	Men's moguls	DNF				32.87	2.71	5.21	16	Did not advance											
Pavel Kolmakov	Men's moguls	25.73	15.53	21.4	11	25.75	15.84	21.7	4 Q	25.3	15.75	21.82	11 Q	25.73	14.16	20.03	10	did not advance			
Dmitriy Reiherd	Men's moguls	24.93	15.62	21.86	7 QF	Bye				25.21	16.99	23.1	5 Q	24.71	17.13	23.48	5 Q	24.21	16.22	22.8	5
Yuliya Galysheva	Women's moguls	30.89	15.48	21.17	6 Q	Bye				30.73	15.51	21.26	5 Q	30.52	15.28	21.12	7	did not advance			
Darya Rybalova	Women's moguls	33.34	11.53	16.24	23	DNS				Did not advance											

== Luge ==
Kazakhstan qualified a place in the women's singles after receiving a reallocation spot (the next country not yet represented in each event) during the 2013–14 Luge World Cup.

Athlete	Event	Run 1		Run 2		Run 3		Run 4		Total	
Athlete	Event	Time	Rank	Time	Rank	Time	Rank	Time	Rank	Time	Rank
Elizaveta Axenova	Women's singles	52.068	29	51.836	30	52.340	30	51.841	25	3:28.085	28

== Short track speed skating ==
Men

Athlete	Event	Heat		Quarterfinal		Semifinal		Final	
Athlete	Event	Time	Rank	Time	Rank	Time	Rank	Time	Rank
Aidar Bekzhanov	500 m	41.800	3	did not advance					20
Aidar Bekzhanov	1500 m	2:19.713	5	—		did not advance			29
Denis Nikisha	1500 m	2:16.452	6	—		did not advance			31
Nurbergen Zhumagaziyev	500 m	42.680	4	did not advance					29
Abzal Azhgaliyev; Aidar Bekzhanov; Aslan Daumov; Denis Nikisha; Nurbergen Zhumagaziyev	5000 m relay	—				6:47.152	2 FA	6:54.630	5

Women

Athlete	Event	Heat		Quarterfinal		Semifinal		Final	
Athlete	Event	Time	Rank	Time	Rank	Time	Rank	Time	Rank
Inna Simonova	500 m	44.387	4	did not advance					25
Inna Simonova	1000 m	1:32.599	3	did not advance					21
Inna Simonova	1500 m	2:30.499	4	—		did not advance			25

Qualification legend: ADV – Advanced due to being impeded by another skater; FA – Qualify to medal round; FB – Qualify to consolation round

== Ski jumping ==
According to the final quota allocation released on 20 January 2014, Kazakhstan had one athlete in qualification position.

Athlete	Event	Qualification			First round			Final			Total	
Athlete	Event	Distance	Points	Rank	Distance	Points	Rank	Distance	Points	Rank	Points	Rank
Alexey Pchelintsev	Men's normal hill	85.5	89.9	46	did not advance							
Alexey Pchelintsev	Men's large hill	109.0	75.8	46	did not advance							
Marat Zhaparov	Men's normal hill	83.0	84.9	49	did not advance							
Marat Zhaparov	Men's large hill	104.5	73.2	48	did not advance							

== Snowboarding ==
According to the final quota allocation released on 20 January 2014, Kazakhstan had one athlete in qualification position.

Alpine

Athlete	Event	Qualification		Round of 16	Quarterfinal	Semifinal	Final	
Athlete	Event	Time	Rank	Opposition Time	Opposition Time	Opposition Time	Opposition Time	Rank
Valeriya Tsoy	Women's giant slalom	1:54.57	23	did not advance				
Valeriya Tsoy	Women's slalom	1:08.67	32	did not advance				

== Speed skating ==
Based on the results from the fall World Cups during the 2013–14 ISU Speed Skating World Cup season, Kazakhstan earned the following start quotas:

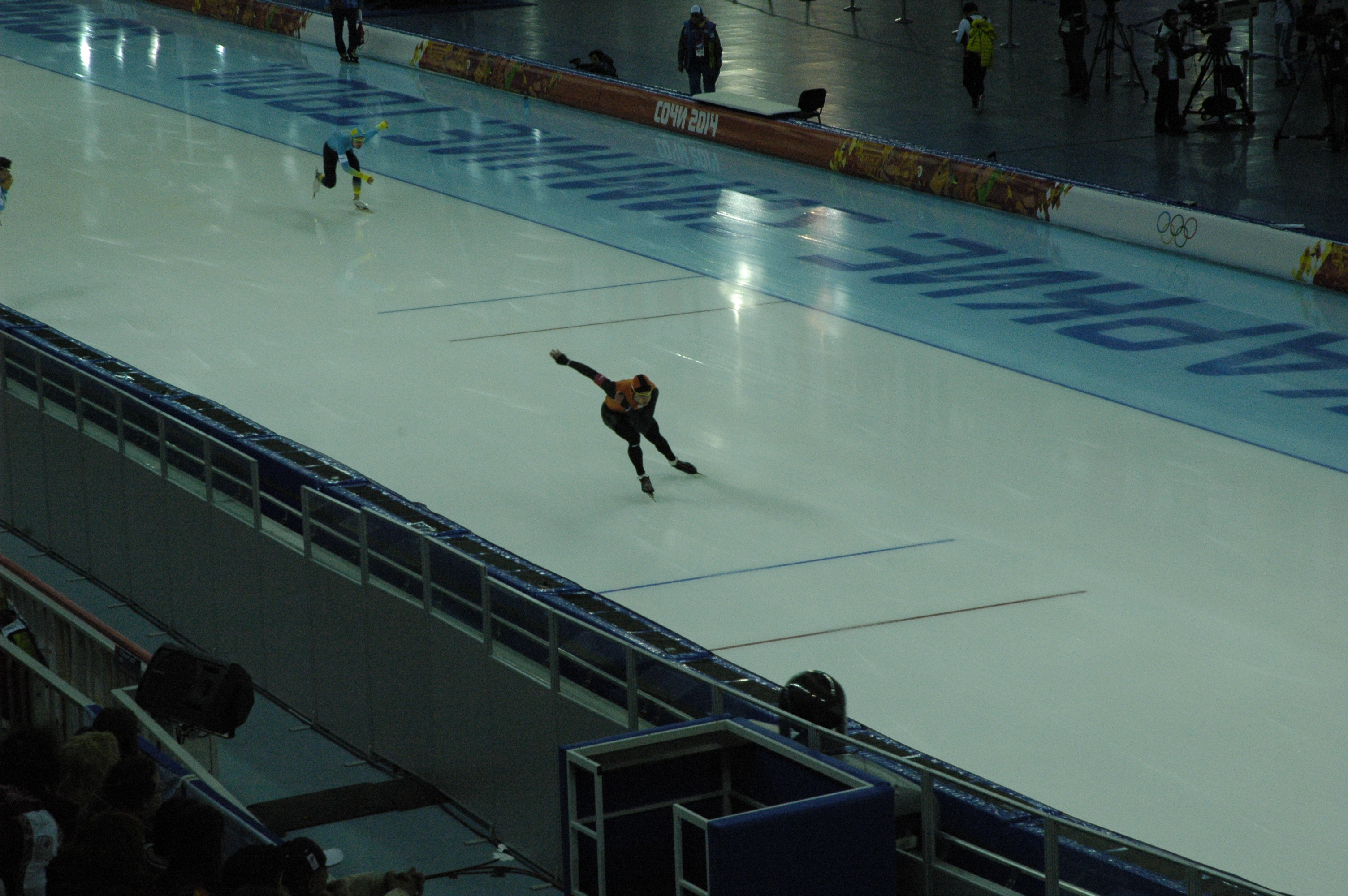
Aleksandr Zhigin (left) riding the 1500 m

Men

Athlete	Event	Race 1		Race 2		Final	
Athlete	Event	Time	Rank	Time	Rank	Time	Rank
Dmitry Babenko	1500 m	—				1:48.67	30
Dmitry Babenko	5000 m	—				6:28.26	15
Dmitry Babenko	10000 m	—				13:33.18	12
Roman Krech	500 m	35.04	9	35.00	6	70.04	7
Roman Krech	1000 m	—				1:09.63	13
Denis Kuzin	1000 m	—				1:09.10	7
Denis Kuzin	1500 m	—				1:45.69	8
Fyodor Mezentsev	1000 m	—				1:11.08	33
Fyodor Mezentsev	1500 m	—				1:49.70	33
Aleksandr Zhigin	1500 m	—				1:49.48	34

Women

Athlete	Event	Race 1		Race 2		Final	
Athlete	Event	Time	Rank	Time	Rank	Time	Rank
Yekaterina Aydova	500 m	34:30.3	22	38.80	19	77.85	22
Yekaterina Aydova	1000 m	—				1:17.25	19
Yekaterina Aydova	1500 m	—				2:00.93	28

== See also ==
- Kazakhstan at the 2014 Summer Youth Olympics
- Kazakhstan at the 2014 Winter Paralympics
