= Darja Jurlova =

Estonian biathlete (born 1992)

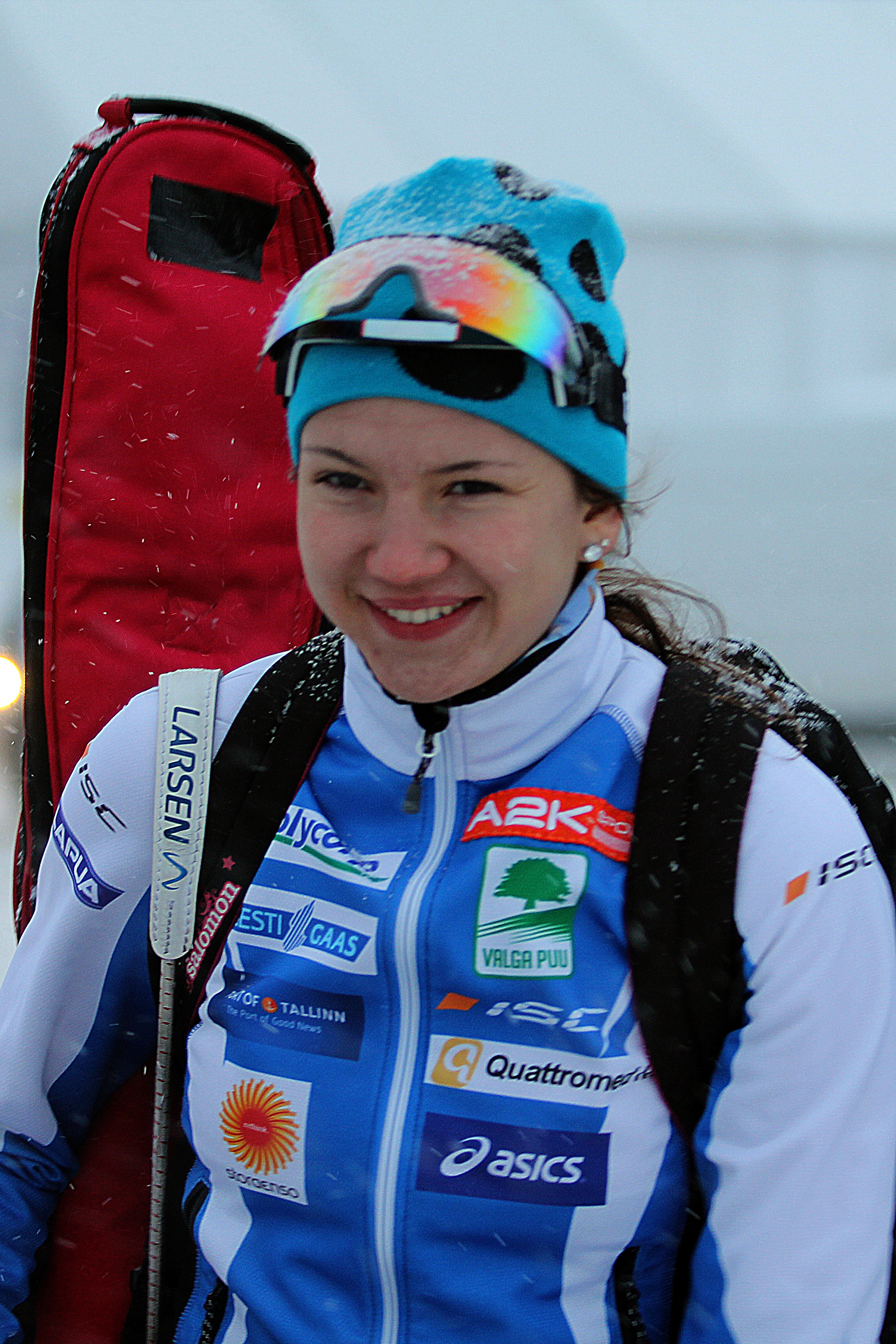
Daria Yurlova.

Darja Jurlova (also spelled Daria Yurlova, born 3 March 1992) is a former Estonian biathlete. She was born in Narva. She competed at the Biathlon World Championships 2011, 2012, 2013 and 2015. She competed at the 2014 Winter Olympics in Sochi, in sprint and individual.
