= Yuki Nakajima =

Japanese biathlete (born 1990)

Personal information
- Nationality: Japanese
- Born: 21 May 1990 (age 35) Niigata Prefecture, Japan

Sport
- Sport: Biathlon

Yuki Nakajima (中島由貴, Nakajima Yuki; born 21 May 1990) is a Japanese biathlete. She was born in the Niigata Prefecture. She competed at the Biathlon World Championships 2012 and 2013, and at the 2014 Winter Olympics in Sochi, in the individual and sprint competitions.
