= Daniil Steptšenko =

Estonian biathlete (born 1986)

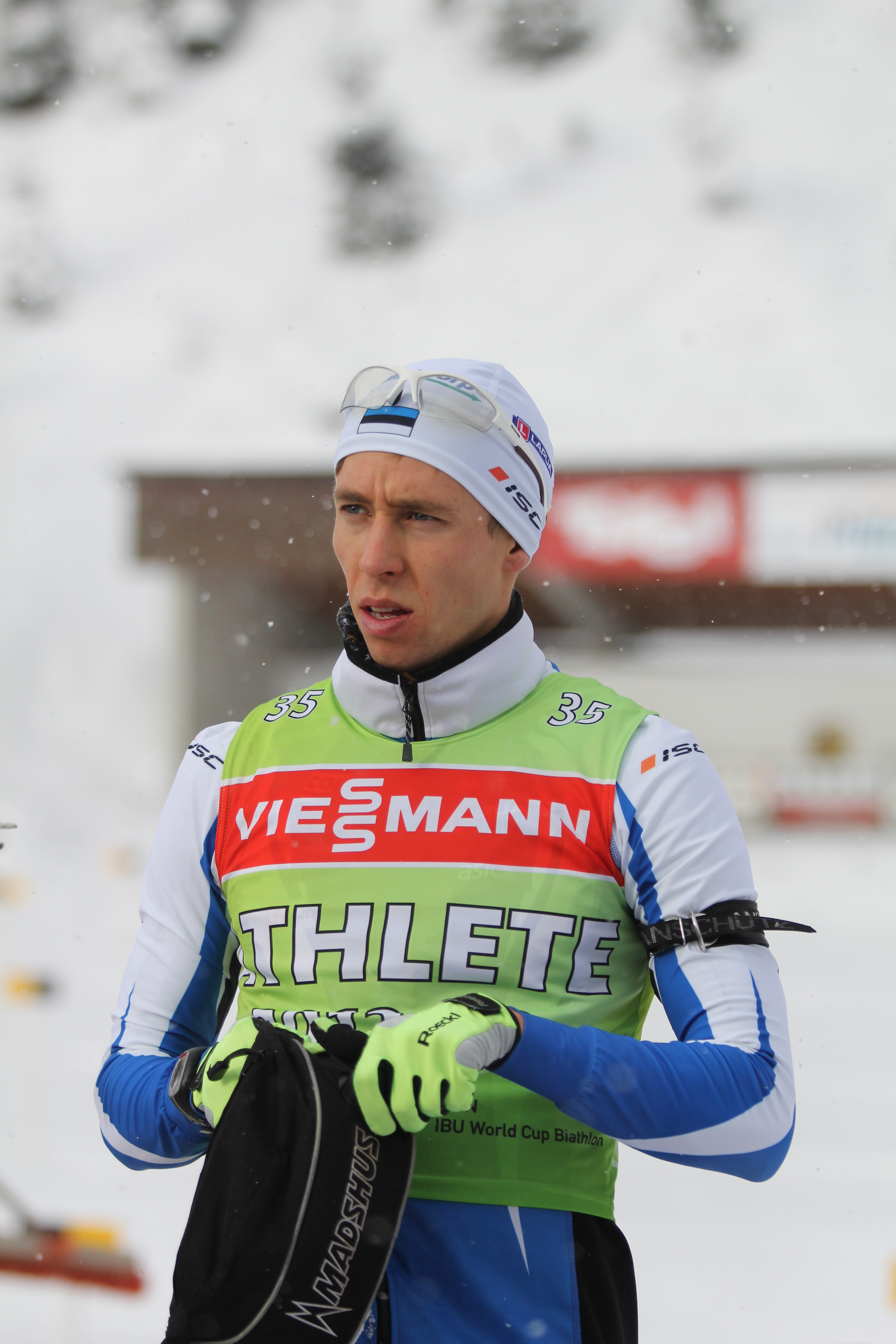
- Steptšenko in Hochfilzen in 2012.

Personal information
- Full name: Daniil Steptšenko
- Born: 13 August 1986 (age 39) Narva, then part of Estonian SSR, Soviet Union
- Height: 1.85 m (6 ft 1 in)

Sport

Professional information
- Sport: Biathlon
- Club: Akke
- World Cup debut: 4 January 2008
- Retired: 21 June 2014

Olympic Games
- Teams: 1 (2014)
- Medals: 0

World Championships
- Teams: 4 (2010, 2011, 2012, 2013)
- Medals: 0

World Cup
- Seasons: 6 (2007/08, 2009/10–2013/14)
- All victories: 0
- All podiums: 0
Medal record
Men's biathlon
Representing Estonia
Summer Junior World Championships
Gold medal – first place	2007 Otepää	4 km sprint

Daniil Steptšenko (born 13 August 1986) is a former Estonian biathlete.

Steptšenko was born in Narva. He competed at the 2014 Winter Olympics for Estonia where his best individual finish was 50th in the sprint.

Citing a lack of funds and support from the Estonian biathlon team, Steptšenko retired from the sport after the 2013–14 season.
