= Kadri Lehtla =

Estonian biathlete (born 1985)

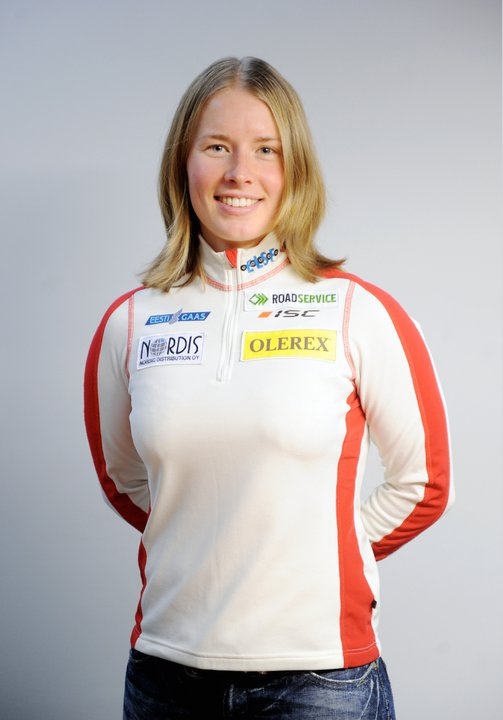
Kadri Lehtla

Kadri Lehtla (born 3 May 1985 in Tallinn) is an Estonian former biathlete. She made her debut 2006 in the IBU Cup with a 36th Place in a sprint in Forni Avoltri. Her best result in the IBU Cup was a 4th place in Östersund in the beginning of the 2011/12 IBU Cup season. She had her debut in the 2008–09 Biathlon World Cup with a 97th place in an Individual in Östersund.

She competed at the 2010 and 2014 Winter Olympics.

== Biathlon results ==
All results are sourced from the International Biathlon Union.

=== Olympic Games ===
Event	Individual	Sprint	Pursuit	Mass start	Relay	Mixed relay
(Canada) 2010 Vancouver	44th	63rd	—	—	17th	—
(Russia) 2014 Sochi	44th	69th	—	—	15th	16th
