= Snowboarding at the 2014 Winter Olympics – Qualification =

These are the qualification rules and the quota allocation for the snowboarding events at the 2014 Winter Olympics.

== Qualification standard ==
An athlete must have placed in the top 30 at a World Cup event after July 2012 or at the 2013 World Championships in that respective event and also have a minimum number of FIS points (100 for all events, except slopestyle which is 50 points).

A total of 252 quota spots are available to athletes to compete at the games. A maximum of 24 athletes can be entered by a National Olympic Committee, with a maximum of 14 men or 14 women.

== Allocation of quotas ==
At the end of the qualification period of January 19, 2014 quotas will be awarded using the Olympic Quota Allocation List (which includes all results of the World Cups from July 2012 and the results of the 2013 World Championship). The spots will be awarded to each country per athlete appearing on the list starting at number one per event until a maximum for each event is reached. Once an NOC has reached the maximum of 4 quota spots in an event, it will no longer be counted for the allocation of quotas. If a nation goes over the total of 14 per sex or 26 total it is up to that nation to select its team to meet the rules by January 22, 2014. Any vacated spots will be then awarded in that event starting from the first athlete not to be awarded a quota.

Maximum athletes per event

| Event | Parallel | Halfpipe | Snowboard Cross | Slopestyle | Total |
|---|---|---|---|---|---|
| Men | 32 | 40 | 40 | 30 | 142 |
| Women | 32 | 30 | 24 | 24 | 110 |
| Total | 64 | 70 | 64 | 54 | 252 |

== Qualification summary ==
Assigned quota list was published on January 25. Some countries qualifying more than one quota can choose to enter the same athlete for both events.

| NOC | Men | | | | Women | | | | Total | Athletes |
| NOC | Parallel | Halfpipe | Snowboardcross | Slopestyle | Parallel | Halfpipe | Snowboardcross | Slopestyle | Total | Athletes |
|---|---|---|---|---|---|---|---|---|---|---|
| Andorra | | | 1 | | | | | | 1 | 1 |
| Australia | | 3 | 3 | 1 | | 4 | 2 | 1 | 14 | 11 |
| Austria | 4 | | ~~4~~ 3 | 3 | 4 | | 2 | 1 | 17 | 17 |
| Belgium | | | | 1 | | | | | 1 | 1 |
| Brazil | | | | | | | 1 | | 1 | 1 |
| Bulgaria | 1 | | | | | | 1 | | 2 | 2 |
| Canada | 3 | 3 | 4 | 4 | 3 | 3 | 2 | 2 | 24 | 24 |
| China | | 2 | | | | 4 | | | 6 | 6 |
| Croatia | | | | | | 1 | | | 1 | 1 |
| Czech Republic | | | 2 | | 1 | 1 | 1 | 1 | 6 | 5 |
| Finland | | 4 | 2 | 4 | | 1 | | 2 | 13 | 11 |
| France | 1 | 2 | 3 | | ~~1~~ | ~~4~~ 3 | 4 | | 13 | 13 |
| Germany | ~~4~~ 3 | 1 | 2 | | 4 | | | | 10 | 10 |
| Great Britain | | 2 | | 2 | | | 1 | 2 | 7 | 7 |
| Ireland | | 1 | | 1 | | | | | 2 | 1 |
| Italy | 4 | | 4 | | 2 | | 2 | | 12 | 12 |
| Japan | ~~1~~ | 4 | | ~~2~~ 1 | 1 | ~~4~~ 1 | 1 | | 8 | TBD |
| Kazakhstan | | | | | 1 | | | | 1 | 1 |
| Netherlands | | 2 | | | ~~1~~ 2 | | 1 | 1 | 6 | 6 |
| New Zealand | | | | | | 1 | | 4 | 5 | 5 |
| Norway | | | 1 | 4 | 1 | | 1 | 2 | 9 | 9 |
| Poland | | 1 | 2 | | 2 | 1 | | | 6 | 6 |
| Russia | 4 | 3 | 3 | 1 | 4 | ~~1~~ | ~~1~~ | | 15 | 15 |
| Serbia | | | | | 1 | | | | 1 | 1 |
| Slovenia | 4 | 2 | ~~2~~ 1 | | 1 | 1 | | 1 | 10 | 10 |
| South Korea | 2 | 2 | | | | | | | 4 | 4 |
| Spain | | | 3 | | | 1 | | | 4 | 4 |
| Sweden | | | | 2 | | | | | 2 | 2 |
| Switzerland | 4 | 4 | 2 | 2 | 4 | 3 | ~~3~~ 2 | 3 | 24 | 24 |
| Ukraine | 1 | | | | 1 | | | | 2 | 2 |
| United States | ~~2~~ 1 | 4 | 4 | 4 | ~~1~~ | 4 | 3 | 4 | 24 | 23 |
| Total: 31 NOCs | 32 | 40 | 40 | 30 | 32 | ~~30~~ 29 | 24 | 24 | 251 | 243 |

=== Next eligible NOC per event ===
If a country rejects a quota spot then additional quotas become available. Countries in bold indicate that country received a rejected quota spot. Here the top 12 eligible countries per event. Note: a country can be eligible for more than one quota spot per event in the reallocation process.

Men

| Parallel | Halfpipe | Snowboard Cross | Slopestyle |
|---|---|---|---|
| ~~Canada~~; ~~Japan~~; **South Korea**; **South Korea**; ~~Great Britain~~; **Bulgaria**; Ukraine; South Korea; Czech Republic; Poland; Czech Republic; United States | Belgium; Spain; Russia; Slovenia; Canada; China; Norway; Bahamas; France; France; Czech Republic; Netherlands | **Spain**; ~~Japan~~; ~~France~~; **Russia**; Netherlands; Germany; Argentina; Czech Republic; Russia; Norway; Australia; Great Britain | **Austria**; Japan; Sweden; Italy; Australia; Netherlands; Australia; Belgium; Germany; New Zealand; Czech Republic; Italy |

Women

| Parallel | Halfpipe | Snowboard Cross | Slopestyle |
|---|---|---|---|
| **Netherlands**; ~~Japan~~; ~~Italy~~; ~~Canada~~; ~~South Korea~~; ~~Netherlands~~; **Serbia**; China; Poland; France; Slovenia; China | **Czech Republic**; ~~Canada~~; **Croatia**; **Poland**; ~~Poland~~; ~~Finland~~; ~~Finland~~; **Switzerland**; ~~South Korea~~; ~~Poland~~; ~~Finland~~; ~~Czech Republic~~ | **France**; ~~Canada~~; ~~United States~~; **Australia**; Germany; Canada; Poland; Russia; Czech Republic; Spain; Russia; Czech Republic | Hungary; Poland; Canada; Canada; Netherlands; Australia; Finland; Slovenia; Finland; Great Britain; Czech Republic; Australia |
