= Biathlon at the 2014 Winter Olympics – Women's pursuit =

Women's pursuit at the XXII Olympic Winter Games
- Pictogram for biathlon
- Venue: Laura Biathlon & Ski Complex
- Date: 11 February 2014
- Competitors: 57 from 23 nations
- Winning time: 29:30.7

Medalists
1st place, gold medalist(s)		Darya Domracheva	Belarus
2nd place, silver medalist(s)		Tora Berger	Norway
3rd place, bronze medalist(s)		Teja Gregorin	Slovenia

The women's 10 km pursuit biathlon competition of the Sochi 2014 Olympics was held at Laura Biathlon & Ski Complex on 11 February 2014.

In the pursuit competition, the competitors start times were determined according to the results of the Women's sprint held two days earlier, with the sprint champion Anastasiya Kuzmina starting first. None of the sprint medalists won a medal in the pursuit. Instead, Darya Domracheva of Belarus became the champion, with Tora Berger of Norway winning the silver medal, and Teja Gregorin of Slovenian winning the bronze. Gregorin's medal became the first ever medal of Slovenia in biathlon.

== Qualification ==
Countries were assigned quotas using a combination of the Nation Cup scores of their top 3 athletes in the individual, sprint, and relay competitions at the 2012 World Championships in Ruhpolding, Germany, and the 2013 World Championships in Nové Město na Moravě, Czech Republic. The top 20 nations would be able to start four athletes in the sprint, while nations 21 through 28 could start one each. Nations below 28 could only start if any nation decided to vacate a quota spot.

During the 2012–13 or 2013–14 Biathlon World Cup season the athlete must have two results at IBU Cup, Open European Championships, World Championships or World Cup in the Sprint or Individual that at a maximum 20% behind the average time of the top three athletes. Or, two placings in the top half at the Junior World Championships. They also can have a combination of both criteria (one of each).

For the pursuit race the top 60 athletes in the sprint race qualified to compete.

== Schedule ==
All dates and times are (UTC+4).

Date	Time	Round
11 February 2014	19:00	Final

== Results ==
The race was started at 19:00.

Rank	Bib	Name	Country	Start	Time	Penalties (P+P+S+S)	Deficit
1st place, gold medalist(s)	9	Darya Domracheva	Belarus	0:32	29:30.7	1 (0+0+0+1)	—
2nd place, silver medalist(s)	10	Tora Berger	Norway	0:34	30:08.3	1 (0+0+0+1)	+37.6
3rd place, bronze medalist(s)	15	Teja Gregorin	Slovenia	0:42	30:12.7	1 (0+0+1+0)	+42.0
4	29	Gabriela Soukalová	Czech Republic	1:11	30:18.3	1 (0+0+0+1)	+47.6
5	12	Valj Semerenko	Ukraine	0:38	30:23.6	1 (1+0+0+0)	+52.9
6	1	Anastasiya Kuzmina	Slovakia	0:00	30:29.1	2 (0+1+0+1)	+58.4
7	2	Olga Vilukhina	Russia	0:20	30:32.9	1 (0+1+0+0)	+1:02.2
8	4	Karin Oberhofer	Italy	0:28	30:37.8	1 (0+0+1+0)	+1:07.1
9	24	Ann Kristin Flatland	Norway	1:04	30:40.2	0 (0+0+0+0)	+1:09.5
10	3	Vita Semerenko	Ukraine	0:22	30:40.3	2 (0+1+1+0)	+1:09.6
DSQ	28	Olga Zaytseva	Russia	1:10	30:43.0	0 (0+0+0+0)	+1:12.3
12	5	Anaïs Bescond	France	0:30	30:43.7	2 (0+0+1+1)	+1:13.0
13	17	Nadezhda Skardino	Belarus	0:44	30:43.7	1 (0+0+0+1)	+1:13.0
14	20	Marie Dorin Habert	France	0:48	30:53.6	1 (0+0+1+0)	+1:22.9
15	13	Selina Gasparin	Switzerland	0:40	30:59.1	2 (0+0+1+1)	+1:28.4
16	30	Kaisa Mäkäräinen	Finland	1:12	31:02.3	3 (0+0+2+1)	+1:31.6
17	6	Dorothea Wierer	Italy	0:31	31:03.2	2 (0+0+2+0)	+1:32.5
18	14	Susan Dunklee	United States	0:42	31:11.6	4 (0+1+0+3)	+1:40.9
19	21	Monika Hojnisz	Poland	0:48	31:14.0	2 (0+0+0+2)	+1:43.3
20	7	Weronika Nowakowska-Ziemniak	Poland	0:31	31:25.4	2 (1+0+1+0)	+1:54.7
21	16	Veronika Vítková	Czech Republic	0:44	31:42.9	2 (1+0+0+1)	+2:12.2
22	26	Olena Pidhrushna	Ukraine	1:06	31:54.2	1 (0+0+0+1)	+2:23.5
23	19	Yana Romanova	Russia	0:47	31:55.1	2 (0+1+1+0)	+2:24.4
24	18	Tiril Eckhoff	Norway	0:45	32:12.3	6 (0+1+2+3)	+2:41.6
25	32	Zina Kocher	Canada	1:19	32:15.1	4 (0+2+0+2)	+2:44.4
26	23	Éva Tófalvi	Romania	0:55	32:15.3	3 (1+2+0+0)	+2:44.6
27	11	Evi Sachenbacher-Stehle	Germany	0:34	32:16.6	6 (2+1+1+2)	+2:45.9
28	31	Megan Imrie	Canada	1:13	32:22.7	2 (1+0+1+0)	+2:52.0
29	22	Andrea Henkel	Germany	0:55	32:30.4	3 (0+1+1+1)	+2:59.7
30	46	Laura Dahlmeier	Germany	1:56	32:38.8	1 (0+0+0+1)	+3:08.1
31	8	Elisa Gasparin	Switzerland	0:31	32:42.8	5 (2+1+1+1)	+3:12.1
32	39	Fuyuko Suzuki	Japan	1:41	32:49.0	1 (0+0+0+1)	+3:18.3
33	37	Liudmila Kalinchik	Belarus	1:31	32:54.9	2 (0+0+0+2)	+3:24.2
34	33	Krystyna Pałka	Poland	1:21	32:56.3	3 (1+0+1+1)	+3:25.6
35	43	Jana Gereková	Slovakia	1:51	32:57.7	4 (2+0+0+2)	+3:27.0
36	35	Synnøve Solemdal	Norway	1:25	33:04.3	3 (1+0+0+2)	+3:33.6
37	57	Elena Khrustaleva	Kazakhstan	2:23	33:06.5	0 (0+0+0+0)	+3:35.8
38	40	Magdalena Gwizdoń	Poland	1:44	33:14.3	2 (1+0+1+0)	+3:43.6
39	27	Lisa Hauser	Austria	1:09	33:25.0	3 (1+0+1+1)	+3:54.3
40	41	Franziska Preuß	Germany	1:46	33:34.0	3 (0+2+1+0)	+4:03.3
41	58	Darya Usanova	Kazakhstan	2:27	33:54.6	2 (1+0+0+1)	+4:23.9
42	45	Eva Puskarčíková	Czech Republic	1:54	33:59.0	2 (0+0+1+1)	+4:28.3
43	51	Diana Rasimovičiūtė	Lithuania	2:12	34:07.1	2 (0+0+0+2)	+4:36.4
44	47	Anaïs Chevalier	France	1:57	34:14.5	1 (1+0+0+0)	+4:43.8
45	25	Rosanna Crawford	Canada	1:04	34:15.6	7 (2+3+2+0)	+4:44.9
46	52	Victoria Padial	Spain	2:15	34:30.3	2 (1+0+0+1)	+4:59.6
47	60	Ekaterina Shumilova	Russia	2:32	34:34.2	3 (0+2+1+0)	+5:03.5
48	38	Michela Ponza	Italy	1:40	34:36.4	3 (1+1+0+1)	+5:05.7
49	54	Nicole Gontier	Italy	2:20	34:37.5	6 (2+2+0+2)	+5:06.8
50	55	Tang Jialin	China	2:20	34:40.4	2 (0+1+0+1)	+5:09.7
51	44	Sara Studebaker	United States	1:53	35:00.0	5 (3+1+0+1)	+5:29.3
52	50	Jitka Landová	Czech Republic	2:10	35:37.6	5 (0+2+3+0)	+6:06.9
53	49	Zhang Yan	China	2:03	36:12.1	2 (0+2+0+0)	+6:41.4
54	53	Annelies Cook	United States	2:17	36:20.9	5 (2+1+1+1)	+6:50.2
55	48	Johanna Talihärm	Estonia	2:03	37:52.5	5 (2+0+0+3)	+8:21.8
56	34	Nastassia Dubarezava	Belarus	1:23	41:01.8*	12 (1+4+4+3)	+11:31.1
	59	Megan Heinicke	Canada	2:28	DNF	8 (2+1+3+2)	
	36	Mari Laukkanen	Finland	1:31	DNS		
	42	Juliya Dzhyma	Ukraine	1:49	DNS		
	56	Marie-Laure Brunet	France	2:21	DNS		

* Includes four-minute penalty

On 27 November 2017, IOC disqualified Olga Vilukhina and Yana Romanova for doping violations.
