= Ski jumping at the 2014 Winter Olympics =

Ski jumping at the XXII Olympic Winter Games
- Venue: RusSki Gorki Jumping Center, Krasnaya Polyana, Russia
- Dates: 8–17 February 2014
- Competitors: 100 from 20 nations

Ski jumping at the 2014 Winter Olympics was held at the RusSki Gorki Jumping Center, Krasnaya Polyana, Russia. The events were held between 8 and 17 February 2014. Women competed in ski jumping for the first time in the history of Winter Olympic Games. A total of four ski jumping events were held.

== Competition schedule ==
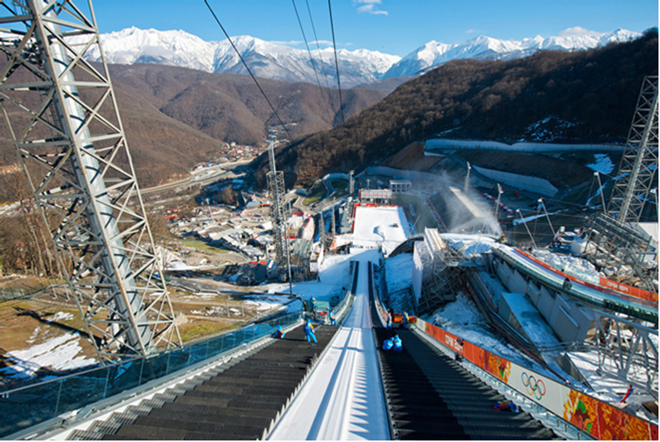
The view of the normal hill from the top.

The following is the competition schedule for all four events.

All times are (UTC+4).

Date	Time	Event
8 February	20:30	Men's individual normal hill qualification
9 February	21:30	Men's individual normal hill
11 February	21:30	Women's individual normal hill
14 February	21:30	Men's individual large hill qualification
15 February	21:30	Men's individual large hill
17 February	21:15	Men's team large hill

== Medal summary ==
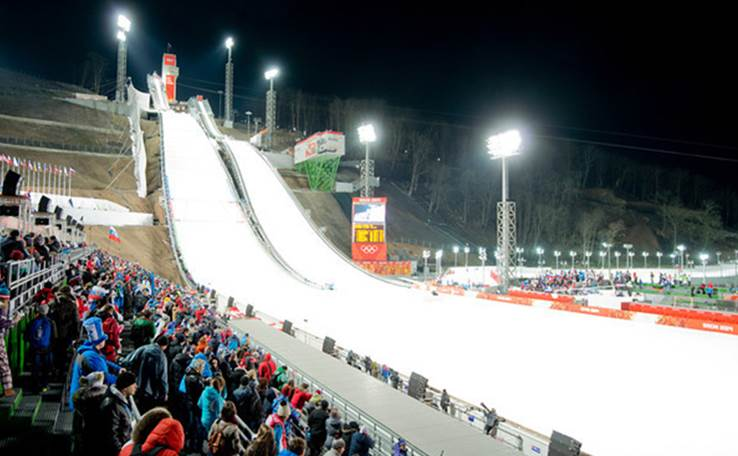
RusSki Gorki Jumping Center, the venue for the ski jumping competitions.

=== Medal table ===
Rank	Nation	Gold	Silver	Bronze	Total
1	Germany	2	0	0	2
1	Poland	2	0	0	2
3	Austria	0	2	0	2
4	Japan	0	1	1	2
4	Slovenia	0	1	1	2
6	France	0	0	1	1
6	Norway	0	0	1	1
Totals (7 entries)		4	4	4	12

=== Events ===
Event	Gold		Silver		Bronze	
Men's individual normal hill	Kamil Stoch; Poland	278.0	Peter Prevc; Slovenia	265.3	Anders Bardal; Norway	264.1
Men's individual large hill	Kamil Stoch; Poland	278.7	Noriaki Kasai; Japan	277.4	Peter Prevc; Slovenia	274.8
Men's team large hill	Germany; Andreas Wank; Marinus Kraus; Andreas Wellinger; Severin Freund	1041.1	Austria; Michael Hayböck; Thomas Morgenstern; Thomas Diethart; Gregor Schlierenzauer	1038.4	Japan; Reruhi Shimizu; Taku Takeuchi; Daiki Ito; Noriaki Kasai	1024.9
Women's individual normal hill	Carina Vogt; Germany	247.4	Daniela Iraschko-Stolz; Austria	246.2	Coline Mattel; France	245.2

== Qualification ==
A maximum of 100 athletes (70 male and 30 female) were allowed to qualify for the ski jumping events. The quotas were allocated using the Olympic Quota Allocation List, which was calculated using the FIS World Cup standings and Continental Cup Standings from seasons 2012–13 and 2013–14 added together.

== Participating nations ==
100 athletes from 20 nations participated, with number of athletes in parentheses. Greece made its Olympic debut in the sport.

- Austria (7)
- Bulgaria (1)
- Canada (6)
- Czech Republic (5)
- Estonia (2)
- Finland (6)
- France (5)
- Germany (9)
- Greece (1)
- Italy (5)
- Japan (8)
- Kazakhstan (2)
- Norway (9)
- Poland (5)
- Romania (1)
- Russia (6)
- Slovenia (9)
- South Korea (4)
- Switzerland (3)
- United States (7)
