= Yurina Yamada =

Japanese ski jumper

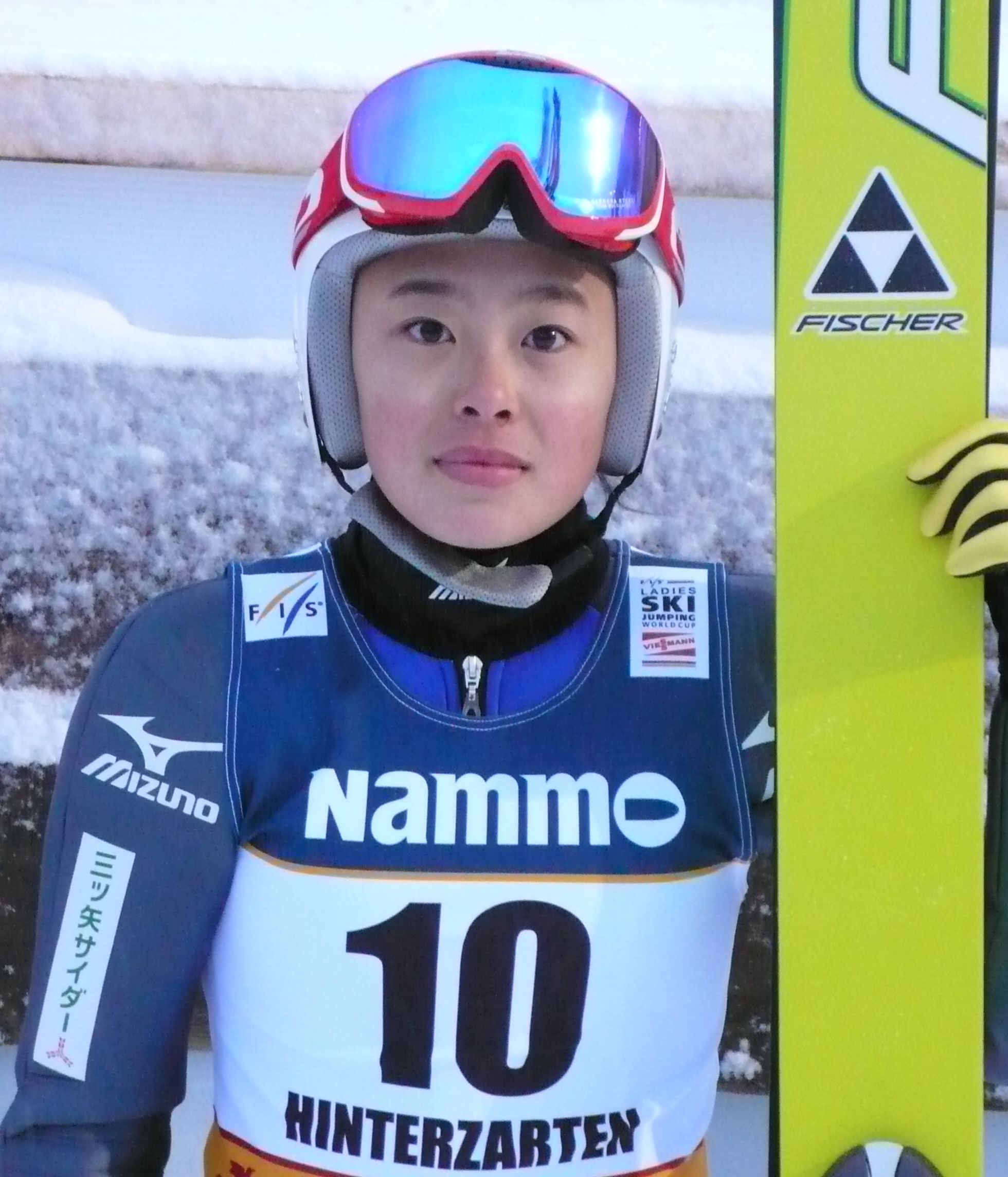

Personal information
- Nationality: Japanese
- Born: 12 July 1996 (age 28); Nagano Prefecture

Sport
- Sport: Ski jumping

Yurina Yamada (山田 優梨菜, Yamada Yurina; born 12 July 1996) is a Japanese ski jumper. She was born in Nagano. She was part of the Japanese team that won gold medals at the 2012 Junior World Championships in Erzurum. She also won a team gold medal at the 2014 Junior World Championships in Val di Fiemme. She competed at the 2014 Winter Olympics in Sochi, in the ladies normal hill.
