= Biathlon at the 2014 Winter Olympics – Women's mass start =

Women's mass start at the XXII Olympic Winter Games
- Pictogram for biathlon
- Venue: Laura Biathlon & Ski Complex
- Date: 17 February 2014
- Competitors: 30 from 15 nations
- Winning time: 35:25.6

Medalists
1st place, gold medalist(s)		Darya Domracheva	Belarus
2nd place, silver medalist(s)		Gabriela Soukalová	Czech Republic
3rd place, bronze medalist(s)		Tiril Eckhoff	Norway

The Women's 12.5 kilometre mass start biathlon competition of the Sochi 2014 Olympics was held at Laura Biathlon & Ski Complex on 17 February 2014.

== Results ==
The race was started at 19:00.

Rank	Bib	Name	Country	Time	Penalties (P+P+S+S)	Deficit
1st place, gold medalist(s)	2	Darya Domracheva	Belarus	35:25.6	1 (0+0+0+1)	—
2nd place, silver medalist(s)	10	Gabriela Soukalová	Czech Republic	35:45.8	1 (0+0+0+1)	+20.2
3rd place, bronze medalist(s)	12	Tiril Eckhoff	Norway	35:52.9	1 (0+1+0+0)	+27.3
4	7	Teja Gregorin	Slovenia	36:05.0	0 (0+0+0+0)	+39.4
5	19	Monika Hojnisz	Poland	36:20.5	0 (0+0+0+0)	+54.9
6	9	Kaisa Mäkäräinen	Finland	36:27.1	2 (0+0+1+1)	+1:01.5
7	21	Olena Pidhrushna	Ukraine	36:37.1	0 (0+0+0+0)	+1:11.5
8	13	Veronika Vítková	Czech Republic	36:49.3	0 (0+0+0+0)	+1:23.7
9	5	Selina Gasparin	Switzerland	36:54.9	2 (0+1+1+0)	+1:29.3
10	17	Anaïs Bescond	France	36:55.3	3 (0+0+3+0)	+1:29.7
11	25	Susan Dunklee	United States	36:57.9	3 (0+1+1+1)	+1:32.3
12	11	Valj Semerenko	Ukraine	37:03.5	2 (0+0+2+0)	+1:37.9
13	18	Karin Oberhofer	Italy	37:03.6	2 (0+0+1+1)	+1:38.0
14	4	Tora Berger	Norway	37:07.8	2 (0+1+1+0)	+1:42.2
15	8	Nadezhda Skardino	Belarus	37:08.0	2 (0+0+1+1)	+1:42.4
16	6	Vita Semerenko	Ukraine	37:03.5	2 (0+0+2+0)	+1:37.9
17	14	Andrea Henkel	Germany	37:19.2	1 (0+0+1+0)	+1:53.6
18	29	Krystyna Pałka	Poland	37:33.9	2 (1+0+1+0)	+2:08.3
19	22	Weronika Nowakowska-Ziemniak	Poland	37:35.2	4 (1+0+2+1)	+2:09.6
20	26	Éva Tófalvi	Romania	37:50.9	2 (1+0+0+1)	+2:25.3
21	3	Olga Vilukhina	Russia	38:05.3	2 (1+0+0+1)	+2:39.7
22	16	Juliya Dzhyma	Ukraine	38:10.8	4 (0+0+2+2)	+2:45.2
DSQ	20	Olga Zaitseva	Russia	38:14.2	1 (0+0+1+0)	+2:48.6
24	28	Ann Kristin Flatland	Norway	38:15.6	2 (0+1+1+0)	+2:50.0
25	24	Dorothea Wierer	Italy	38:37.4	3 (1+2+0+0)	+3:11.8
26	1	Anastasiya Kuzmina	Slovakia	38:50.3	5 (0+2+2+1)	+3:24.7
27	30	Megan Imrie	Canada	38:59.0	5 (1+0+1+3)	+3:33.4
28	15	Franziska Hildebrand	Germany	39:09.5	3 (1+0+1+1)	+3:43.9
DSQ	23	Evi Sachenbacher-Stehle	Germany	35:53.9	0 (0+0+0+0)	+28.3
	27	Elisa Gasparin	Switzerland	DNF	1 (0+1)	

On 27 November 2017, IOC disqualified Olga Vilukhina for doping violations.
