= Belarus at the 2014 Winter Olympics =

- IOC code: BLR
- NOC: Belarus Olympic Committee
- Website: www.noc.by (in Russian and English)

in Sochi
- Competitors: 25 in 5 sports
- Flag bearers: Aleksei Grishin (opening); Darya Domracheva (closing)
- Medals Ranked 8th: Gold 5 Silver 0 Bronze 1 Total 6

Winter Olympics appearances (overview)
- 1994; 1998; 2002; 2006; 2010; 2014; 2018; 2022; 2026

Other related appearances
- Poland (1924–1936); Soviet Union (1952–1988); Unified Team (1992); Individual Neutral Athletes (2026)

Belarus competed at the 2014 Winter Olympics in Sochi, Russia, from 7 to 23 February 2014. Belarus' team consisted of 26 athletes, competing in five sports.

With five gold medals won this was Belarus' most successful Winter Olympics. The five gold medals was also the most won by the country at any Olympics since independence.

== Competitors ==
Sport	Men	Women	Total
Alpine skiing	1	1	2
Biathlon	5	5	10
Cross-country skiing	4	1	5
Freestyle skiing	4	2	6
Short track speed skating	1	1	2
Total	15	10	25

== Medalists ==
Medal	Name	Sport	Event	Date
Gold	Darya Domracheva	Biathlon	Women's pursuit	February 11
Gold	Darya Domracheva	Biathlon	Women's individual	February 14
Gold	Alla Tsuper	Freestyle skiing	Women's aerials	February 14
Gold	Darya Domracheva	Biathlon	Women's mass start	February 17
Gold	Anton Kushnir	Freestyle skiing	Men's aerials	February 17
Bronze	Nadezhda Skardino	Biathlon	Women's individual	February 14

== Alpine skiing ==
According to the final quota allocation released on 20 January 2014, Belarus had two athletes in qualification position.

Athlete	Event	Run 1		Run 2		Total	
Athlete	Event	Time	Rank	Time	Rank	Time	Rank
Yuri Danilochkin	Men's downhill	—				2:10.58	31
Yuri Danilochkin	Men's super-G	—				1:22.45	38
Yuri Danilochkin	Men's combined	DNF					
Yuri Danilochkin	Men's giant slalom	DNF					
Yuri Danilochkin	Men's slalom	DNF					
Maria Shkanova	Women's super-G	—				DNF	
Maria Shkanova	Women's giant slalom	1:26.79	52	1:23.79	41	2:50.58	44
Maria Shkanova	Women's slalom	59.67	33	57.56	31	1:57.23	29

== Biathlon ==
Based on their performance at the 2012 and 2013 Biathlon World Championships, Belarus qualified 5 men and 5 women.

Men

Athlete	Event	Time	Misses	Rank
Yauhen Abramenka	Sprint	26:55.0	2 (1+1)	56
Yauhen Abramenka	Pursuit	39:11.5	5 (0+0+4+1)	51
Yauhen Abramenka	Individual	55:38.8	3 (1+1+1+0)	53
Uladzimir Chapelin	Sprint	25:49.7	1 (0+1)	29
Uladzimir Chapelin	Pursuit	36:57.2	1 (0+0+1+0)	41
Uladzimir Chapelin	Individual	54:59.2	3 (1+1+0+1)	49
Aliaksandr Darozhka	Individual	58:27.7	5 (2+0+2+1)	80
Yuryi Liadau	Sprint	26:55.1	2 (1+1)	57
Yuryi Liadau	Pursuit	39:46.2	4 (1+1+0+2)	56
Siarhei Novikau	Sprint	26:00.8	0 (0+0)	33
Siarhei Novikau	Pursuit	38:59.5	3 (0+1+1+1)	50
Siarhei Novikau	Individual	55:41.7	2 (0+1+1+0)	54
Yauhen Abramenka; Uladzimir Chapelin; Yuryi Liadau; Siarhei Novikau	Team relay	1:16:02.3	5 (0+5)	13

Women

Athlete	Event	Time	Misses	Rank
Darya Domracheva	Sprint	21:38.6	1 (1+0)	9
Darya Domracheva	Pursuit	29:30.7	1 (0+0+0+1)	1st place, gold medalist(s)
Darya Domracheva	Individual	43:19.6	1 (0+1+0+0)	1st place, gold medalist(s)
Darya Domracheva	Mass start	35:25.6	1 (0+0+0+1)	1st place, gold medalist(s)
Nastassia Dubarezava	Sprint	22:29.7	1 (0+1)	34
Nastassia Dubarezava	Pursuit	41:01.8	12 (1+4+4+3)	56
Lyudmila Kalinchik	Sprint	22:37.8	2 (1+1)	37
Lyudmila Kalinchik	Pursuit	32:54.9	2 (0+0+0+2)	33
Lyudmila Kalinchik	Individual	48:06.2	2 (0+1+0+1)	25
Nadzeya Pisareva	Individual	48:55.4	3 (0+3+0+0)	35
Nadezhda Skardino	Sprint	21:50.9	0 (0+0)	17
Nadezhda Skardino	Pursuit	30:43.7	1 (0+0+0+1)	13
Nadezhda Skardino	Individual	44:57.8	0 (0+0+0+0)	3rd place, bronze medalist(s)
Nadezhda Skardino	Mass start	37:08.0	2 (0+0+1+1)	16
Darya Domracheva; Lyudmila Kalinchik; Nadzeya Pisareva; Nadezhda Skardino	Team relay	1:11:33.4	9 (1+8)	5

Mixed

Athlete	Event	Time	Misses	Rank
Yauhen Abramenka; Uladzimir Chapelin; Nastassia Dubarezava; Lyudmila Kalinchik	Team relay	1:13:11.8	9 (0+9)	10

== Cross-country skiing ==
According to final quota allocation released on 20 January 2014, Belarus had five athletes in qualification position.

Distance
Men

Athlete	Event	Classical		Freestyle		Final		
Athlete	Event	Time	Rank	Time	Rank	Time	Deficit	Rank
Sergei Dolidovich	15 km classical	—				42:55.4	+4:25.7	53
Sergei Dolidovich	30 km skiathlon	36:57.2	32	33:55.9	38	1:11:28.1	+3:12.7	34
Sergei Dolidovich	50 km freestyle	—				1:47:09.5	+14.3	5
Aliaksei Ivanou	50 km freestyle	—				1:52:52.9	+5:57.7	46
Alexander Lasutkin	15 km classical	—				42:45.1	+4:15.4	49
Alexander Lasutkin	30 km skiathlon	38:46.9	52	35:12.2	54	1:14:39.4	+6:24.0	55
Michail Semenov	15 km classical	—				43:36.0	+5:06.3	59
Michail Semenov	30 km skiathlon	36:48.2	29	32:54.5	19	1:10:13.3	+1:57.9	24
Michail Semenov	50 km freestyle	—				1:47:36.0	+40.8	17
Sergei Dolidovich; Aliaksei Ivanou; Alexander Lasutkin; Michail Semenov	4×10 km relay	—				1:34:40.1	+5:58.1	14

Women

Athlete	Event	Classical		Freestyle		Final		
Athlete	Event	Time	Rank	Time	Rank	Time	Deficit	Rank
Alena Sannikova	10 km classical	—				31:42.2	+3:24.4	40
Alena Sannikova	15 km skiathlon	21:46.4	55	21:47.0	54	44:09.7	5:36.1	53
Alena Sannikova	30 km freestyle	—				1:18:46.3	+7:41.1	42

Sprint

Athlete	Event	Qualification		Quarterfinal		Semifinal		Final	
Athlete	Event	Time	Rank	Time	Rank	Time	Rank	Time	Rank
Michail Semenov	Men's sprint	3:42.93	48	Did not advance					
Valiantsina Kaminskaya	Women's sprint	2:46.76	47	Did not advance					

== Freestyle skiing ==
According to the final quota allocation released on 20 January 2014, Belarus had six athletes in qualification position. The full list of Belarusian freestyle skiing team was officially announced on 22 January 2014.

Aerials

Athlete	Event	Qualification				Final					
Athlete	Event	Jump 1		Jump 2		Jump 1		Jump 2		Jump 3	
Athlete	Event	Points	Rank	Points	Rank	Points	Rank	Points	Rank	Points	Rank
Dmitri Dashinski	Men's aerials	106.64	8	117.19	1 Q	108.41	5 Q	100.45	8	did not advance	
Aleksei Grishin	Men's aerials	76.82	20	88.94	9	Did not advance					
Anton Kushnir	Men's aerials	107.52	7	115.38	2 Q	119.03	2 Q	115.84	3 Q	134.50	1st place, gold medalist(s)
Denis Osipau	Men's aerials	81.86	17	111.05	5 Q	99.36	9	did not advance			
Hanna Huskova	Women's aerials	44.08	22	52.60	15	Did not advance					
Alla Tsuper	Women's aerials	66.15	14	77.52	6 Q	99.18	1 Q	88.50	4 Q	98.01	1st place, gold medalist(s)

== Short track speed skating ==
Based on their performance at World Cup 3 and 4 in November 2013, Belarus qualified 1 man (1500 m) and 1 woman (1500 m). For the first time ever a Belarusian male athlete qualified in the sport.

Athlete	Event	Heat		Semifinal		Final	
Athlete	Event	Time	Rank	Time	Rank	Time	Rank
Maksim Siarheyeu	Men's 1500 m	2:19.505	5	Did not advance			28
Volha Talayeva	Women's 1500 m	2:27.817	6	Did not advance			32
