= Biathlon at the 2014 Winter Olympics – Men's mass start =

Men's mass start at the XXII Olympic Winter Games
- Pictogram for biathlon
- Venue: Laura Biathlon & Ski Complex
- Date: 18 February 2014
- Competitors: 30 from 13 nations
- Winning time: 42:29.1

Medalists
1st place, gold medalist(s)		Emil Hegle Svendsen	Norway
2nd place, silver medalist(s)		Martin Fourcade	France
3rd place, bronze medalist(s)		Ondřej Moravec	Czech Republic

The men's mass start competition of the Sochi 2014 Olympics was held at Laura Biathlon & Ski Complex. The race was initially scheduled for the evening of 16 February 2014, but it was rescheduled for the following morning due to poor visibility conditions. However, fog caused two additional delays on 17 February 2014, so the race was not run until the afternoon of 18 February.

== Results ==
The race started at 14:30.

Rank	Bib	Name	Country	Time	Penalties (P+P+S+S)	Deficit
1st place, gold medalist(s)	9	Emil Hegle Svendsen	Norway	42:29.1	0 (0+0+0+0)	—
2nd place, silver medalist(s)	2	Martin Fourcade	France	42:29.1	1 (1+0+0+0)	+0.0
3rd place, bronze medalist(s)	4	Ondřej Moravec	Czech Republic	42:42.9	0 (0+0+0+0)	+13.8
4	25	Jakov Fak	Slovenia	42:57.2	2 (0+1+1+0)	+28.1
5	8	Evgeniy Garanichev	Russia	43:25.3	3 (0+1+1+1)	+56.2
6	18	Fredrik Lindström	Sweden	43:30.5	2 (0+1+0+1)	+1:01.4
7	3	Dominik Landertinger	Austria	43:32.8	2 (1+0+0+1)	+1:03.7
8	12	Johannes Thingnes Bø	Norway	43:34.2	1 (1+0+0+0)	+1:05.1
9	28	Brendan Green	Canada	43:38.3	2 (1+1+0+0)	+1:09.2
10	22	Jean-Philippe Leguellec	Canada	43:41.6	1 (0+0+0+1)	+1:12.5
11	13	Anton Shipulin	Russia	43:48.2	3 (0+1+1+1)	+1:19.1
12	23	Björn Ferry	Sweden	43:48.3	3 (1+1+1+0)	+1:19.2
13	10	Simon Schempp	Germany	43:48.3	3 (2+1+0+0)	+1:19.2
14	21	Andrejs Rastorgujevs	Latvia	43:53.1	3 (0+1+1+1)	+1:24.0
15	27	Matej Kazár	Slovakia	44:25.6	2 (0+1+1+0)	+1:56.5
16	11	Simon Eder	Austria	44:30.7	4 (1+1+1+1)	+2:01.6
17	7	Jean-Guillaume Béatrix	France	44:34.2	3 (0+0+2+1)	+2:05.1
18	16	Arnd Peiffer	Germany	44:35.0	4 (0+1+2+1)	+2:05.9
19	14	Evgeny Ustyugov	Russia	~~44:37.3~~ DSQ	3 (0+0+1+2)	+2:08.2
20	15	Dmitry Malyshko	Russia	44:42.9	4 (1+0+3+0)	+2:13.8
21	30	Tim Burke	United States	44:55.9	4 (2+0+2+0)	+2:26.8
22	1	Ole Einar Bjørndalen	Norway	45:08.3	6 (2+0+0+4)	+2:39.2
23	29	Lowell Bailey	United States	45:19.2	5 (2+1+1+1)	+2:50.1
24	6	Jaroslav Soukup	Czech Republic	45:22.2	4 (0+1+0+3)	+2:53.1
25	26	Dominik Windisch	Italy	45:28.4	5 (1+1+3+0)	+2:59.3
26	5	Erik Lesser	Germany	45:34.2	4 (0+0+2+2)	+3:05.1
27	20	Christoph Sumann	Austria	45:39.0	4 (1+2+1+0)	+3:09.9
	17	Lukas Hofer	Italy	DNF	4 (2+2+0)	
	19	Nathan Smith	Canada	DNF	5 (2+3)	
	24	Simon Fourcade	France	DNF	2 (2)	
