= Slovenia at the 2014 Winter Olympics =

- IOC code: SLO
- NOC: Olympic Committee of Slovenia
- Website: www.olympic.si (in Slovene and English)

in Sochi
- Competitors: 66 in 8 sports
- Flag bearers: Tomaž Razingar (opening); Žan Košir (closing)
- Medals Ranked 16th: Gold 2 Silver 2 Bronze 4 Total 8

Winter Olympics appearances (overview)
- 1992; 1994; 1998; 2002; 2006; 2010; 2014; 2018; 2022; 2026

Other related appearances
- Yugoslavia (1924–1988)

Slovenia competed at the 2014 Winter Olympics in Sochi, Russia, from 7 to 23 February 2014. Sixty-six competitors were chosen to participate, in eight sports. For the first time since the country's independence, the Slovenia men's national ice hockey team qualified for the Olympic tournament (although previously, Yugoslavia's teams at the Olympics consisted mostly of Slovenian players).

On 12 February, Tina Maze won the women's downhill, becoming the first ever Winter Olympic gold medalist for Slovenia. Maze's skiing time was identical to that of Dominique Gisin of Switzerland, so two gold medals were awarded, this being the first time that an Olympic gold medal in alpine skiing was shared. Maze went on to win a second gold in giant slalom. Peter Prevc and Žan Košir each won one silver and one bronze medal in ski jumping and snowboarding, respectively. Vesna Fabjan won bronze in the women's cross-country sprint and Teja Gregorin another bronze in the women's biathlon pursuit, bringing the total number of medals to 8.

Eight medals is an all-time Olympic record for Slovenia. In fact, Slovenia won more medals in Sochi than at all previous Winter Olympics combined.

== Medalists ==
Medal	Name	Sport	Event	Date
Gold	Tina Maze	Alpine skiing	Women's downhill	12 February
Gold	Tina Maze	Alpine skiing	Women's giant slalom	18 February
Silver	Peter Prevc	Ski jumping	Normal hill individual	9 February
Silver	Žan Košir	Snowboarding	Men's parallel slalom	22 February
Bronze	Vesna Fabjan	Cross-country skiing	Women's sprint	11 February
Bronze	Teja Gregorin	Biathlon	Women's pursuit	11 February
Bronze	Peter Prevc	Ski jumping	Men's large hill individual	15 February
Bronze	Žan Košir	Snowboarding	Men's parallel giant slalom	19 February

== Summary ==
On 21 January 2014, the Olympic Committee of Slovenia officially confirmed 66 competitors who would represent the country at the Sochi Winter Olympics. Following the national ice hockey team securing a place at the Olympic tournament by winning the group at the qualification tournament, Sochi saw the largest Slovenian delegation at Winter Olympics to date. Tomaž Razingar, the captain of the ice hockey team, was chosen as the flag bearer at the opening ceremony. Slovenia sent competitors in 8 sports, apart from ice hockey also in alpine skiing, biathlon, freestyle skiing, snowboarding, Nordic combined, ski jumping, and cross-country skiing.

Pre-games favourites included alpine skier Tina Maze, a double silver medallist from Vancouver, who won the 2013 Alpine Skiing World Cup with a huge margin and victories in all five disciplines in a single season, biathlete Jakov Fak, bronze medallist from Vancouver where he represented Croatia, snowboarder Rok Marguč, the 2013 World Champion in parallel slalom, and the Slovenian ski jumping team, together with Peter Prevc (2nd in the World Cup standings prior to the Olympics) at both individual events. Petra Majdič, who won bronze in Vancouver in cross-country skiing, concluded her competitive career in 2011 and came to Sochi as the leader of Slovenian delegation.

The first days of the Olympics saw several injuries in the Slovenian team. Alpine skier Rok Perko fell at the downhill training and broke his nose, consequently he did not appear in neither the downhill nor the super-G races. Snowboarder Cilka Sadar suffered a knee injury at halfpipe training which also caused her withdrawal from the competition. Matija Mihič, who qualified for snowboard cross, suffered a knee injury before coming to Sochi and did not travel to Russia. Ski jumper Robert Kranjec fell at the qualifications of the normal hill event. He had to skip the normal hill event but managed to compete at the large hill and at the team event.

Alpine skiing turned out to be the most successful sport for Slovenia in Sochi. Following a 4th place in combined, Tina Maze won the gold medal in downhill on 12 February, tying with Dominique Gisin of Switzerland. Maze then finished 5th in super-G and won her second gold medal in giant slalom. In slalom, Maze finished on the 8th place and concluded the Olympics as best individual skier in Sochi. Other Slovenian skiers were moderately successful, with Maruša Ferk and Ilka Štuhec finishing 10th in combined and downhill, respectively. Among the men, the best result was 11th place of Mitja Valenčič in slalom.

In biathlon, Jakov Fak was defending his bronze medal from Vancouver but finished 10th in sprint. Following less successful performances in pursuit and individual events, Fak finished 4th in mass start. Teja Gregorin won a bronze medal in pursuit, improving the 15th place from the sprint event. This was also first medal in biathlon for Slovenia, since Jakov Fak's bronze from Vancouver was won for Croatia. Gregorin then finished 11th in individual event and 5th in mass start. The latter result was later improved to a 4th place, following the disqualification of Evi Sachenbacher-Stehle of Germany. Slovenia did not compete in the mixed relay since Andreja Mali failed to qualify for the Olympics individually. In the men's relay, Slovenia recorded another successful result, finishing 6th.

Cross-country skiing saw only female participants compete for Slovenia. Vesna Fabjan and Katja Višnar made it to semi-finals in sprint. Višnar placed 5th in her group and finished 9th overall while Fabjan finished 2nd in her group and advanced to the finals. There, she won a bronze medal, thus succeeding Majdič on the podium in this discipline. The women's relay team finished in 11th place, and Višnar and Alenka Čebašek finished the team sprint as 10th.

Filip Flisar was the sole representative of Slovenia in freestyle skiing. He won his round of 16 and quarterfinals groups but then fell in the semifinals. In the small final, Flisar finished on the 2nd place, thus finishing 6th overall and improving his achievement from Vancouver, where he was 8th. After the race, the Slovenian and Canadian teams filed a complaint to FIS, pointing out presumed irregularities in the equipment of French competitors. The complaint was rejected as it was filed too late.

At the ice hockey tournament, the Slovenian team was considered an underdog. Slovenia qualified for Olympics for the first time since independence, by beating Belarus, Denmark and Ukraine at the qualification tournament (however, the Yugoslavian teams that competed at the Olympics five times consisted mostly of Slovenian players). Slovenia played in the Group A. In the first game, Slovenia played against the host nation, Russia. After two quick Russian goals at the beginning of the game, Žiga Jeglič scored twice in the second third. Russia won 5–2, but the Slovenian team received a very positive feedback for their Olympic debut. In the following game, Slovenia defeated Slovakia 3–1; goal scorers for Slovenia were Rok Tičar, Tomaž Razingar and Anže Kopitar. In the last group match, Slovenia lost to United States 5–1, Marcel Rodman scored a goal for Slovenia in the last minute of the match. The victory against Slovakia assured Slovenia 3rd place in Group A and 8th place in playoff standings. In the qualification playoffs, Slovenia defeated Austria 4–0. Goal scorers were Kopitar, Jan Urbas, Sabahudin Kovačevič and Jan Muršak. Robert Kristan was commended for his defences as the goalie. In the quarterfinals, Slovenia lost 0–5 to Sweden and finished 7th in the overall standings. Despite this defeat, the 2014 Olympic tournament saw the best performance of the Slovenian team in history. Foreign commentators praised the achievements of the team coming from a country with 150 professional players, seven skating rinks and one NHL star player (Kopitar of Los Angeles Kings).

In Nordic combined, Slovenia's best result was a 16th place of Marjan Jelenko at large hill/10 km event. Since Slovenia qualified only three competitors, they did not participate in the team competition.

Ski jumping was the next sport where the stakes were high for Slovenia. Peter Prevc came to Sochi as 2nd-ranked in the World Cup standings and Slovenia won both team events of the season. Following his fall in the qualifications for the normal hill event, Robert Kranjec missed the competition. Prevc was third after the first round and gained another place in the finals, winning a silver medal and finishing just after Kamil Stoch of Poland. This was the first medal for Slovenia in Sochi and the first individual Olympic medal in ski jumping for independent Slovenia (in Salt Lake City, Slovenia finished 3rd in the team event). In addition to Prevc's medal, Jernej Damjan finished 9th and Jurij Tepeš 26th. At the large hill, Kranjec returned but failed to reach the final round. Prevc was fourth after the first round and again gained one place in the finals, winning his second Olympic medal, a bronze. At the team large hill event, Slovenian team finished on the 5th place after excellent performance by Prevc (who set best results in both series) and somehow weaker jumps by Kranjec, Damjan and Tepeš. In the inaugural women's normal hill event, Maja Vtič finished 6th after a weaker landing in the first series. Katja Požun finished 11th.

In snowboarding, Slovenia was represented by three competitors in freestyle and five in alpine disciplines. Cilka Sadar could not start in slopestyle because of an injury at a training. In halfpipe, the best result was achieved by Tim-Kevin Ravnjak, who finished 8th in the final round. Since the introduction of parallel disciplines to the Olympics, Slovenia always had at least one competitor in quarterfinals but never higher. In parallel giant slalom, Žan Košir, Rok Flander and Rok Marguč secured places in the quarterfinals. Only Košir advanced to the semifinals, where he lost to Nevin Galmarini of Switzerland. In the third place race, Košir defeated Patrick Bussler of Germany, thus winning bronze, the first medal for Slovenian snowboarders. In parallel slalom, Košir made it to the finals, where he won his second Olympic medal, a silver, coming second to Vic Wild of Russia.

Košir's silver medal was the final medal for Slovenia at the Sochi Olympics. Following this win, Košir was chosen as the flag bearer for Slovenia at the closing ceremony.

== Alpine skiing ==
Slovenia's team consisted of eight athletes. Only seven competed as skier Rok Perko was injured during training and could not compete.

Men

Athlete	Event	Run 1		Run 2		Total	
Athlete	Event	Time	Rank	Time	Rank	Time	Rank
Klemen Kosi	Downhill	—N/a				2:08.98	24
Klemen Kosi	Super-G	—N/a				1:21.27	29
Klemen Kosi	Giant slalom	1:26.61	43	1:26.75	36	2:53.36	37
Klemen Kosi	Combined	1:56.41	30	DSQ			
Klemen Kosi	Slalom	DNF					
Žan Kranjec	Giant slalom	1:23.82	29	1:24.66	21	2:48.48	23
Žan Kranjec	Slalom	DNF					
Mitja Valenčič	Slalom	48.32	11	55.82	15	1:44.14	11

Women

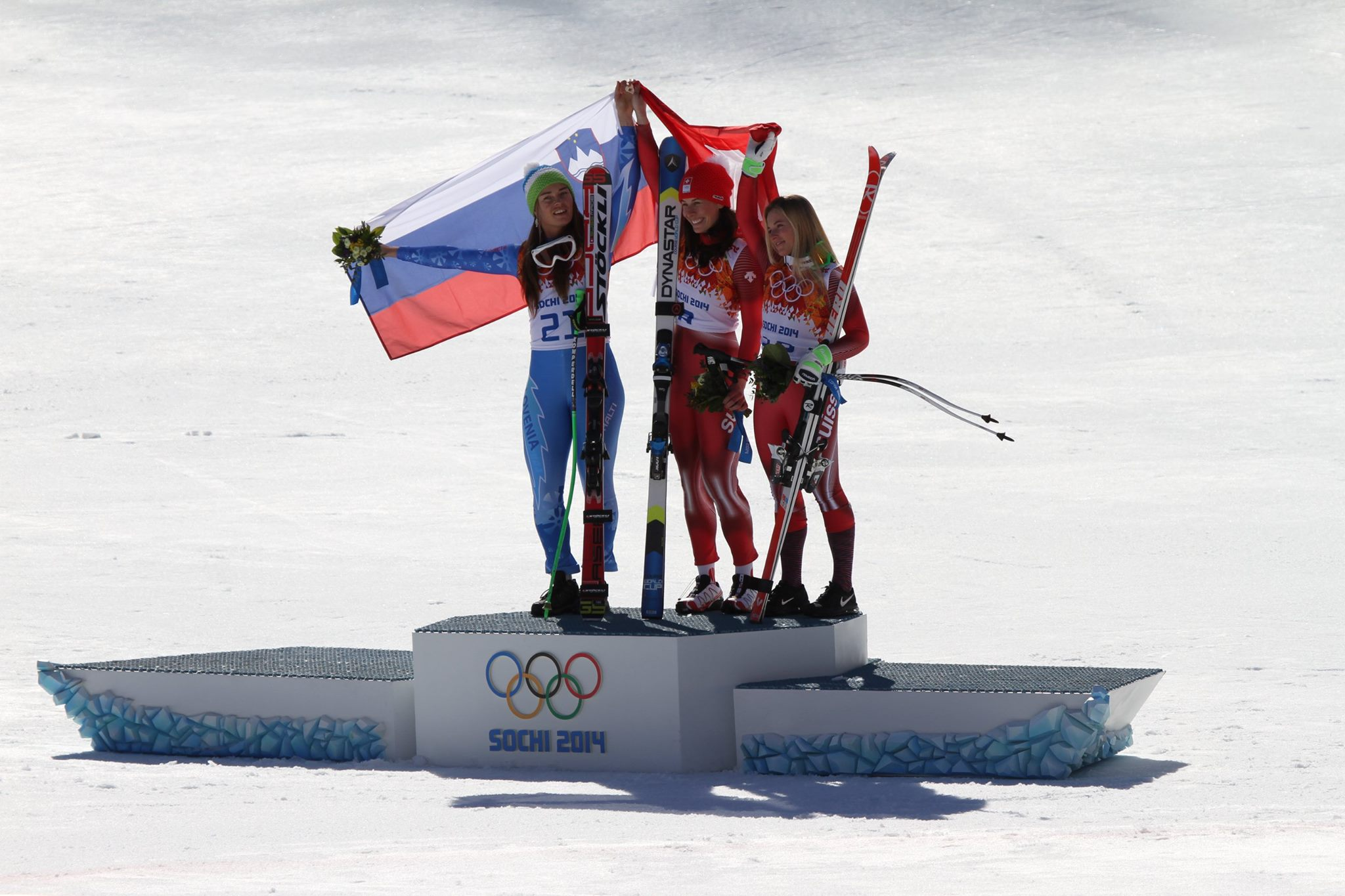
Women's downhill podium

Athlete	Event	Run 1		Run 2		Total	
Athlete	Event	Time	Rank	Time	Rank	Time	Rank
Maruša Ferk	Downhil	—N/a				1:43.24	18
Maruša Ferk	Super-G	—N/a				1:28.19	16
Maruša Ferk	Giant slalom	1:22.57	31	DNF			
Maruša Ferk	Slalom	57.43	26	52.73	13	1:50.16	19
Maruša Ferk	Combined	1:44.87	17	52.02	10	2:36.89	10
Katarina Lavtar	Giant slalom	1:21.22	19	1:19.42	=15	2:40.64	20
Katarina Lavtar	Slalom	DNS					
Tina Maze	Downhill	—N/a				1:41.57	1st place, gold medalist(s)
Tina Maze	Super-G	—N/a				1:26.28	5
Tina Maze	Giant slalom	1:17.88	1	1:18.99	11	2:36.87	1st place, gold medalist(s)
Tina Maze	Slalom	53.29	3	52.96	14	1:46.25	8
Tina Maze	Combined	1:43.54	3	51.71	7	2:35.25	4
Ilka Štuhec	Downhill	—N/a				1:42.65	10
Ilka Štuhec	Super-G	—N/a				1:27.69	13
Ilka Štuhec	Giant slalom	1:23.03	34	1:21.82	31	2:44.85	31
Ilka Štuhec	Combined	1:44.26	11	DNF			

== Biathlon ==
Based on their performance at the 2012 and 2013 Biathlon World Championships, Slovenia qualified 5 men and 1 woman.

Athlete	Event	Time	Misses	Rank
Klemen Bauer	Men's sprint	25:40.7	2 (1+1)	26
Klemen Bauer	Men's pursuit	35:39.8	4 (0+1+2+1)	24
Klemen Bauer	Men's individual	55:29.1	5(2+0+1+2)	52
Peter Dokl	Men's sprint	27:20.1	1 (1+0)	72
Peter Dokl	Men's individual	57:51.5	3 (0+2+0+1)	74
Jakov Fak	Men's sprint	25:06.5	0 (0+0)	10
Jakov Fak	Men's pursuit	36:11.2	6 (2+1+1+2)	31
Jakov Fak	Men's individual	53:17.6	4 (1+0+1+2)	32
Jakov Fak	Men's mass start	42:57.2	2 (0+1+1+0)	4
Janez Marič	Men's sprint	26:41.3	1 (0+1)	51
Janez Marič	Men's pursuit	38:58.4	3 (0+1+0+2)	49
Janez Marič	Men's individual	56:22.4	3 (1+1+0+1)	63
Klemen Bauer; Peter Dokl; Jakov Fak; Janez Marič	Men's team relay	1:13:43.1	5 (0+5)	6
Teja Gregorin	Women's sprint	21:48.9	1 (0+1)	15
Teja Gregorin	Women's pursuit	30:12.7	1 (0+0+1+0)	3rd place, bronze medalist(s)
Teja Gregorin	Women's individual	46:38.7	2 (1+0+0+1)	11
Teja Gregorin	Women's mass start	36:05.0	0 (0+0+0+0)	4

== Cross-country skiing ==
Distance

Athlete	Event	Classical		Freestyle		Final		
Athlete	Event	Time	Rank	Time	Rank	Time	Deficit	Rank
Alenka Čebašek	Women's 10 km classical	—N/a				31:13.6	+2:55.8	30
Barbara Jezeršek	Women's 10 km classical	—N/a				31:40.0	+3:22.2	38
Barbara Jezeršek	Women's 15 km skiathlon	19:48.9	15	20:05.8	22	40:29.5	+1:55.9	19
Barbara Jezeršek	Women's 30 km freestyle	—N/a				1:15:35.8	+4:30.6	31
Nika Razinger	Women's 10 km classical	—N/a				33:54.1	+5:36.3	57
Katja Višnar	Women's 10 km classical	—N/a				32:47.0	+4:29.2	51
Alenka Čebašek; Vesna Fabjan; Barbara Jezeršek; Katja Višnar	Women's 4×5 km relay	—N/a				56:37.0	+3:34.3	11

Sprint

Athlete	Event	Qualification		Quarterfinal		Semifinal		Final	
Athlete	Event	Time	Rank	Time	Rank	Time	Rank	Time	Rank
Alenka Čebašek	Women's sprint	2:35.94	14 Q	2:37.69	4	did not advance			
Vesna Fabjan	Women's sprint	2:34.13	4 Q	2:37.22	2 Q	2:36.02	2 Q	2:35.89	3rd place, bronze medalist(s)
Nika Razinger	Women's sprint	2:36.55	17 Q	2:43.61	6	did not advance			
Katja Višnar	Women's sprint	2:32.47	2 Q	2:36.45	1 Q	2:37.76	5	did not advance	
Alenka Čebašek; Katja Višnar	Women's team sprint	—N/a				17:00.32	6 q	16:57.98	10

== Freestyle skiing ==
Ski cross

Athlete	Event	Seeding		Round of 16	Quarterfinal	Semifinal	Final	
Athlete	Event	Time	Rank	Position	Position	Position	Position	Rank
Filip Flisar	Men's ski cross	1:17.35	7	1 Q	1 Q	4 FB	2	6

Qualification legend: FA – Qualify to medal round; FB – Qualify to consolation round

== Ice hockey ==
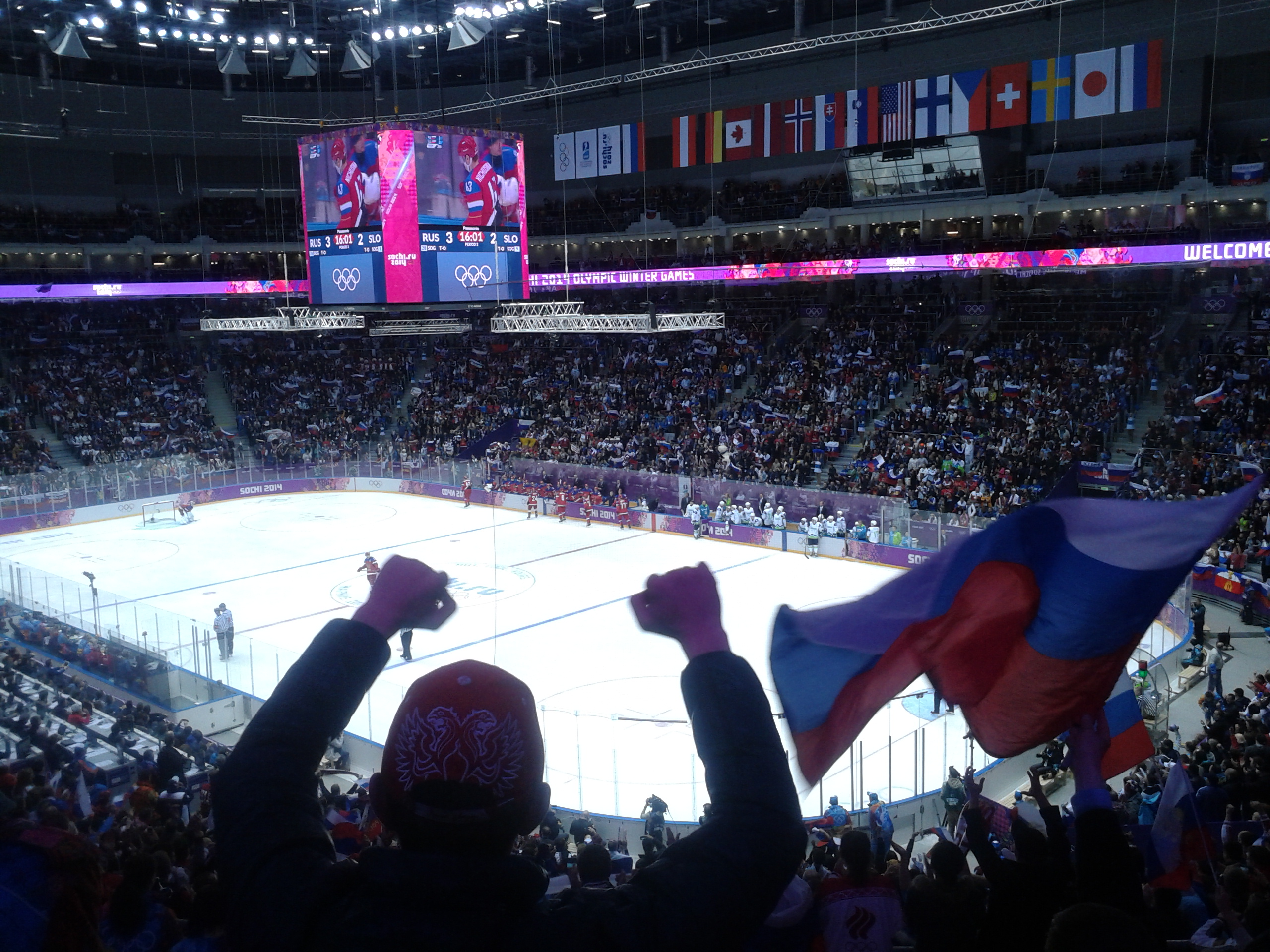
Slovenia vs. Russia

Slovenia qualified a men's team by winning the qualification tournament, this was the first time the nation qualified an ice hockey team to the Olympics.

=== Men's tournament ===
Roster

The following is the Slovenian roster in the men's ice hockey tournament of the 2014 Winter Olympics.

No.	Pos.	Name	Height	Weight	Birthdate	Birthplace	2013–14 team
1	G	Andrej Hočevar	183 cm (6 ft 0 in)	83 kg (183 lb)	21 November 1984	Ljubljana	(France) Dauphins d'Épinal (FRA)
4	D	Andrej Tavželj	188 cm (6 ft 2 in)	95 kg (209 lb)	14 March 1984	Jesenice	(France) Dragons de Rouen (FRA)
7	D	Klemen Pretnar	180 cm (5 ft 11 in)	82 kg (181 lb)	31 August 1986	Bled	(Austria) VSV (AUT)
8	F	Žiga Jeglič	185 cm (6 ft 1 in)	80 kg (180 lb)	24 February 1988	Kranj	(Germany) Ingolstadt (DEL)
9	F	Tomaž Razingar – C	186 cm (6 ft 1 in)	98 kg (216 lb)	25 April 1979	Jesenice	(Sweden) Troja/Ljungby (SWE-2)
11	F	Anže Kopitar – A	193 cm (6 ft 4 in)	103 kg (227 lb)	24 August 1987	Jesenice	(United States) Los Angeles Kings (NHL)
12	F	David Rodman	185 cm (6 ft 1 in)	83 kg (183 lb)	10 September 1983	Jesenice	(Sweden) Oskarshamn (SWE-2)
14	D	Matic Podlipnik	180 cm (5 ft 11 in)	82 kg (181 lb)	9 August 1992	Jesenice	(Czech Republic) Dukla Jihlava (CZE-2)
15	D	Blaž Gregorc	190 cm (6 ft 3 in)	95 kg (209 lb)	18 January 1990	Jesenice	(Czech Republic) Pardubice (CZE)
16	F	Aleš Mušič	176 cm (5 ft 9 in)	82 kg (181 lb)	28 June 1982	Ljubljana	(Slovenia) Olimpija Ljubljana (AUT)
17	D	Žiga Pavlin	193 cm (6 ft 4 in)	97 kg (214 lb)	30 April 1985	Kranj	(Sweden) Troja/Ljungby (SWE-2)
19	F	Žiga Pance	185 cm (6 ft 1 in)	89 kg (196 lb)	1 January 1989	Ljubljana	(Italy) Bolzano-Bozen Foxes (AUT)
22	F	Marcel Rodman – A	186 cm (6 ft 1 in)	85 kg (187 lb)	25 September 1981	Jesenice	(Germany) Schwenninger Wild Wings (DEL)
24	F	Rok Tičar	180 cm (5 ft 11 in)	82 kg (181 lb)	3 May 1989	Jesenice	(Germany) Kölner Haie (DEL)
26	F	Jan Urbas	192 cm (6 ft 4 in)	98 kg (216 lb)	26 January 1989	Ljubljana	(Germany) Red Bull München (DEL)
28	D	Aleš Kranjc	182 cm (6 ft 0 in)	91 kg (201 lb)	29 July 1981	Jesenice	(Germany) Kölner Haie (DEL)
33	G	Robert Kristan	182 cm (6 ft 0 in)	85 kg (187 lb)	4 April 1983	Jesenice	(Slovakia) Nitra (SVK)
39	F	Jan Muršak	180 cm (5 ft 11 in)	85 kg (187 lb)	20 January 1988	Maribor	(Russia) CSKA Moscow (KHL)
40	G	Luka Gračnar	179 cm (5 ft 10 in)	85 kg (187 lb)	31 October 1993	Jesenice	(Austria) Red Bull Salzburg (AUT)
51	D	Mitja Robar	177 cm (5 ft 10 in)	86 kg (190 lb)	4 January 1983	Maribor	(Germany) Krefeld Pinguine (DEL)
55	F	Robert Sabolič	183 cm (6 ft 0 in)	90 kg (200 lb)	18 September 1988	Jesenice	(Germany) Ingolstadt (DEL)
71	F	Bostjan Goličič	183 cm (6 ft 0 in)	88 kg (194 lb)	12 June 1989	Kranj	(France) Diables Rouges de Briançon (FRA)
86	D	Sabahudin Kovačevič	190 cm (6 ft 3 in)	95 kg (209 lb)	26 February 1986	Jesenice	(Kazakhstan) Saryarka Karagandy (VHL)
91	F	Miha Verlič	194 cm (6 ft 4 in)	86 kg (190 lb)	21 August 1991	Maribor	(Slovenia) Olimpija Ljubljana (AUT)
92	F	Anže Kuralt	175 cm (5 ft 9 in)	80 kg (180 lb)	31 October 1991	Kranj	(France) Dauphins d'Épinal (FRA)

Group stage

Team	Pld	W	OTW	OTL	L	GF	GA	GD	Pts	Qualification
United States	3	2	1	0	0	15	4	+11	8	Quarterfinals
Russia	3	1	1	1	0	8	5	+3	6	
Slovenia	3	1	0	0	2	6	11	−5	3	
Slovakia	3	0	0	1	2	2	11	−9	1	

Source: IIHF

13 February 2014; 16:30	Russia	5–2 (2–0, 1–2, 2–0)	Slovenia	Bolshoy Ice Dome, Sochi; Attendance: 11,653

Game reference

Semyon Varlamov
Goalies
Robert Kristan
Referees:
(Canada) Dave Jackson
(Czech Republic) Vladimír Šindler
Linesmen:
(Canada) Lonnie Cameron
(Canada) Chris Carlson

A. Ovechkin (E. Malkin, A. Semin) – 1:17	1–0
E. Malkin (A. Ovechkin, E. Medvedev) – 3:54	2–0
	2–1	21:43 – Ž. Jeglič (M. Robar)
I. Kovalchuk (E. Malkin, A. Radulov) (PP) – 37:48	3–1
	3–2	38:52 – Ž. Jeglič (R. Sabolič, A. Kopitar)
V. Nichushkin (A. Tereshchenko) – 43:59	4–2
A. Belov (N. Nikitin, A. Tereshchenko) – 47:53	5–2

6 min
Penalties
6 min
35
Shots
14

15 February 2014; 12:00	Slovakia	1–3 (0–0, 0–0, 1–3)	Slovenia	Bolshoy Ice Dome, Sochi; Attendance: 7,438

Game reference

Jaroslav Halák
Goalies
Robert Kristan
Referees:
(Russia) Konstantin Olenin
(United States) Tim Peel
Linesmen:
(Canada) Derek Amell
(Belarus) Ivan Dedioulia

	0–1	43:23 – R. Tičar (Ž. Jeglič, R. Sabolič) (PP)
	0–2	48:59 – T. Razingar (J. Urbas, M. Rodman)
	0–3	49:22 – A. Kopitar (J. Muršak)
T. Jurčo (T. Záborský, Z. Chára) (PP) – 59:42	1–3

8 min
Penalties
10 min
28
Shots
31

16 February 2014; 16:30	Slovenia	1–5 (0–2, 0–2, 1–1)	United States	Shayba Arena, Sochi; Attendance: 4,892

Game reference

Luka Gračnar
Goalies
Ryan Miller
Referees:
(Canada) Mike Leggo
(Finland) Jyri Rönn
Linesmen:
(Slovakia) Miroslav Valach
(Canada) Mark Wheler

	0–1	1:04 – P. Kessel (J. Pavelski)
	0–2	4:33 – P. Kessel (J. Pavelski, B. Orpik)
	0–3	31:05 – P. Kessel (J. van Riemsdyk, J. Pavelski)
	0–4	32:17 – R. McDonagh (B. Wheeler, T. Oshie)
	0–5	43:26 – D. Backes (R. Callahan, D. Brown)
M. Rodman (D. Rodman, J. Urbas) – 59:42	1–5

4 min
Penalties
6 min
18
Shots
28

Qualification playoffs

18 February 2014; 12:00	Slovenia	4–0 (2–0, 1–0, 1–0)	Austria	Bolshoy Ice Dome, Sochi; Attendance: 6,821

Game reference

Robert Kristan
Goalies
Mathias Lange
Referees:
(Canada) Dave Jackson
(Czech Republic) Vladimír Šindler
Linesmen:
(United States) Tommy George
(United States) Chris Woodworth

A. Kopitar (R. Tičar, Ž. Jeglič) (PP) – 5:29	1–0
J. Urbas (S. Kovačević) (SH) – 11:57	2–0
S. Kovačević (D. Rodman, J. Muršak) – 23:21	3–0
J. Muršak (D. Rodman) (EN) – 57:02	4–0

6 min
Penalties
10 min
35
Shots
30

Quarterfinals

19 February 2014; 12:00	Sweden	5–0 (1–0, 0–0, 4–0)	Slovenia	Bolshoy Ice Dome, Sochi; Attendance: 7,325

Game reference

Henrik Lundqvist
Goalies
Robert Kristan
Referees:
(United States) Brad Meier
(Czech Republic) Vladimír Šindler
Linesmen:
(Canada) Chris Carlson
(Canada) Mark Wheler

A. Steen (D. Alfredsson, E. Karlsson) (PP) – 18:50	1–0
D. Sedin (L. Eriksson) – 41:42	2–0
L. Eriksson (N. Bäckström, J. Oduya) – 48:04	3–0
C. Hagelin (N. Kronwall, Ji. Ericsson) – 51:27	4–0
C. Hagelin (E. Karlsson) – 56:10	5–0

8 min
Penalties
8 min
38
Shots
19

== Nordic combined ==
Athlete	Event	Ski jumping			Cross-country		Total	
Athlete	Event	Distance	Points	Rank	Time	Rank	Time	Rank
Gašper Berlot	Normal hill/10 km	92.5	106.3	35	24:44.9	31	26:25.9	34
Gašper Berlot	Large hill/10 km	120.0	96.4	34	23:46.6	28	25:56.6	33
Marjan Jelenko	Normal hill/10 km	99.0	123.9	7	24:53.2	32	25:23.2	21
Marjan Jelenko	Large hill/10 km	124.5	109.1	14	23:08.6	20	24:28.6	16
Mitja Oranič	Normal hill/10 km	93.5	109.2	30	25:17.4	34	26:36.4	37
Mitja Oranič	Large hill/10 km	118.5	96.7	33	24:29.8	40	27:38.8	39

== Ski jumping ==
Slovenia qualified nine quota places in ski jumping.

Men

Athlete	Event	Qualification			First round			Final			Total	
Athlete	Event	Distance	Points	Rank	Distance	Points	Rank	Distance	Points	Rank	Points	Rank
Jernej Damjan	Normal hill	93.5	115.6	14 Q	99.5	128.6	11 Q	101.0	126.1	7	254.7	9
Jernej Damjan	Large hill	126.0	115.9	8 Q	130.5	124.7	13 Q	124.5	121.2	20	245.9	17
Robert Kranjec	Normal hill	BYE			DNS			did not advance				
Robert Kranjec	Large hill	BYE			125.5	108.1	37	did not advance				
Peter Prevc	Normal hill	BYE			102.5	134.8	3 Q	99.0	130.5	3	265.8	2nd place, silver medalist(s)
Peter Prevc	Large hill	BYE			135.0	134.5	4 Q	131.0	140.3	1	274.8	3rd place, bronze medalist(s)
Jurij Tepeš	Normal hill	89.5	106.9	31 Q	100.0	127.0	12 Q	93.0	109.7	29	236.7	26
Jurij Tepeš	Large hill	123.5	107.9	15 Q	124.5	118.2	23 Q	131.0	124.0	16	242.2	20
Jernej Damjan; Robert Kranjec; Peter Prevc; Jurij Tepeš	Team large hill	—N/a			515.0	488.2	5 Q	524.0	507.4	5	995.6	5

Women

Athlete	Event	First round			Final			Total	
Athlete	Event	Distance	Points	Rank	Distance	Points	Rank	Points	Rank
Eva Logar	Normal hill	90.0	100.1	28	88.0	99.0	26	199.1	27
Katja Požun	Normal hill	96.5	113.9	17	99.5	119.7	7	233.6	11
Špela Rogelj	Normal hill	91.5	102.0	26	86.5	97.6	27	199.6	26
Maja Vtič	Normal hill	100.5	120.1	6	100.5	121.8	3	241.9	6

== Snowboarding ==
Slovenia qualified a total of nine athletes for the following events. Matija Mihič qualified for snowboard cross but had to stay at home because of knee injury.

Alpine

Athlete	Event	Qualification		Round of 16	Quarterfinal	Semifinal	Final	
Athlete	Event	Time	Rank	Opposition Time	Opposition Time	Opposition Time	Opposition Time	Rank
Rok Flander	Men's giant slalom	1:37.53	6 Q	Bergmann (GER); W −0.34	Bussler (GER); L +0.40	did not advance		
Rok Flander	Men's slalom	1:00.30	22	did not advance				
Žan Košir	Men's giant slalom	1:37.82	8 Q	P Schoch (SUI); W −1.17	Prommegger (AUT); W −0.53	Galmarini (SUI); L +1.36	Bussler (GER); W −2.26	3rd place, bronze medalist(s)
Žan Košir	Men's slalom	58.92	2 Q	Anderson (CAN); W −0.44	Galmarini (SUI); W −0.20	March (ITA); W DSQ	Wild (RUS); L +0.11	2nd place, silver medalist(s)
Rok Marguč	Men's giant slalom	1:37.33	4 Q	Anderson (CAN); W −0.47	Galmarini (SUI); L +0.09	did not advance		
Rok Marguč	Men's slalom	59.52	12 Q	Bussler (GER); L +0.84	did not advance			
Izidor Šušteršič	Men's giant slalom	1:41.02	21	did not advance				
Izidor Šušteršič	Men's slalom	DSQ		did not advance				
Glorija Kotnik	Women's giant slalom	1:57.68	24	did not advance				
Glorija Kotnik	Women's slalom	1:05.94	23	did not advance				

Freestyle

Athlete	Event	Qualification				Semifinal				Final			
Athlete	Event	Run 1	Run 2	Best	Rank	Run 1	Run 2	Best	Rank	Run 1	Run 2	Best	Rank
Jan Kralj	Men's halfpipe	59.75	27.75	59.75	15	did not advance							
Tim-Kevin Ravnjak	Men's halfpipe	68.75	76.50	76.50	5 QS	72.00	75.50	75.50	6 QS	72.25	16.50	72.25	8
Cilka Sadar	Women's slopestyle	DNS				did not advance							

Qualification Legend: QF – Qualify directly to final; QS – Qualify to semifinal

== See also ==
- Slovenia at the 2014 Summer Youth Olympics
