= Germany at the 2014 Winter Olympics =

- IOC code: GER
- NOC: German Olympic Sports Confederation
- Website: www.dosb.de (in German, English, and French)

in Sochi
- Competitors: 153 in 15 sports
- Flag bearers: Maria Höfl-Riesch (opening); Felix Loch (closing)
- Medals Ranked 5th: Gold 9 Silver 5 Bronze 5 Total 19

Winter Olympics appearances (overview)
- 1928; 1932; 1936; 1948; 1952; 1956–1988; 1992; 1994; 1998; 2002; 2006; 2010; 2014; 2018; 2022; 2026

Other related appearances
- United Team of Germany (1956–1964); East Germany (1968–1988); West Germany (1968–1988)

Germany competed at the 2014 Winter Olympics in Sochi, Russia, from 7 to 23 February 2014. The first round of nominations was on 18 December, the second round on 23 January. Germany sent 153 athletes (76 men, 77 women). Chef de Mission was Michael Vesper. The outfitting was held in January at the Erding Air Base.

During the Games, Germany had a German House, that was located in the village of Estosadok, on the Mzymta River, 4 kilometers (2.5 mi) upstream from Krasnaya Polyana (Mountain Cluster).

German president Joachim Gauck did not attend the 2014 Winter Olympics. He has not said publicly that the decision was a political gesture.

On 21 February it was announced that biathlete Evi Sachenbacher-Stehle had tested positive for methylhexanamine and was sent home from Sochi.

== Medalists ==
Medals by sport
Sport	1st place, gold medalist(s)	2nd place, silver medalist(s)	3rd place, bronze medalist(s)	Total
Alpine skiing	1	1	1	3
Biathlon	1	1	0	2
Cross-country skiing	0	0	1	1
Figure skating	0	0	1	1
Luge	4	1	0	5
Nordic combined	1	1	1	3
Ski jumping	2	0	0	2
Snowboarding	0	1	1	2
Total	9	5	5	19

Medals by date
Day	Date	1st place, gold medalist(s)	2nd place, silver medalist(s)	3rd place, bronze medalist(s)	Total
Day 1	8 February	0	0	0	0
Day 2	9 February	1	0	0	1
Day 3	10 February	1	0	0	1
Day 4	11 February	2	1	0	3
Day 5	12 February	2	0	1	3
Day 6	13 February	1	1	0	2
Day 7	14 February	0	0	0	0
Day 8	15 February	0	1	1	2
Day 9	16 February	0	0	0	0
Day 10	17 February	1	0	0	1
Day 11	18 February	0	0	2	2
Day 12	19 February	0	0	0	0
Day 13	20 February	0	1	0	1
Day 14	21 February	0	0	0	0
Day 15	22 February	1	1	1	3
Day 16	23 February	0	0	0	0
Total		9	5	5	19

Multiple medalists
Name	Sport	1st place, gold medalist(s)	2nd place, silver medalist(s)	3rd place, bronze medalist(s)	Total
Erik Lesser	Biathlon	1	1	0	2
Maria Höfl-Riesch	Alpine skiing	1	1	0	2
Felix Loch	Luge	2	0	0	2
Natalie Geisenberger	Luge	2	0	0	2
Tobias Wendl	Luge	2	0	0	2
Tobias Arlt	Luge	2	0	0	2
Eric Frenzel	Nordic Combined	1	0	1	2
Fabian Rießle	Nordic Combined	0	1	1	2
Total		8	6	5	19

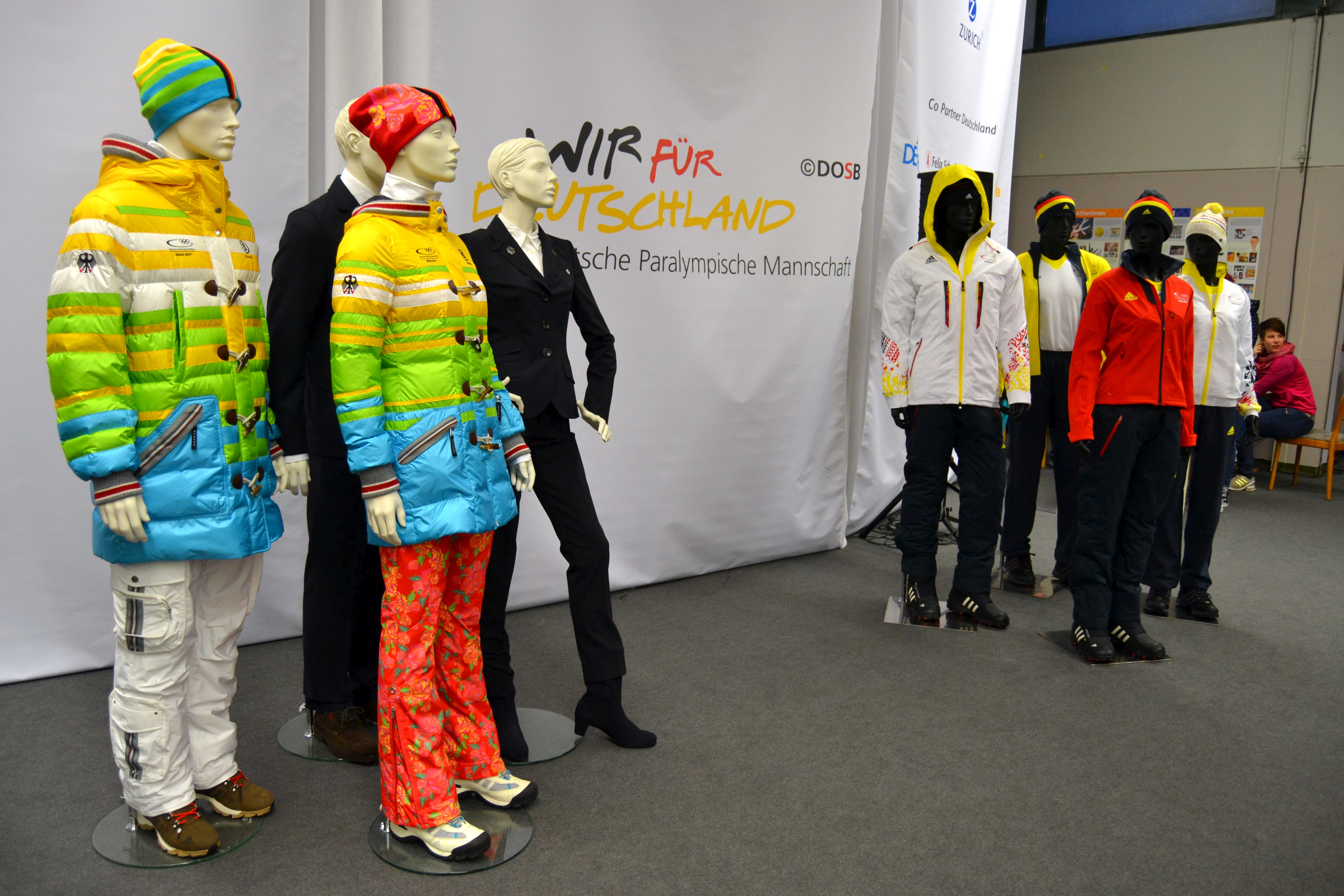
Olympic team clothing

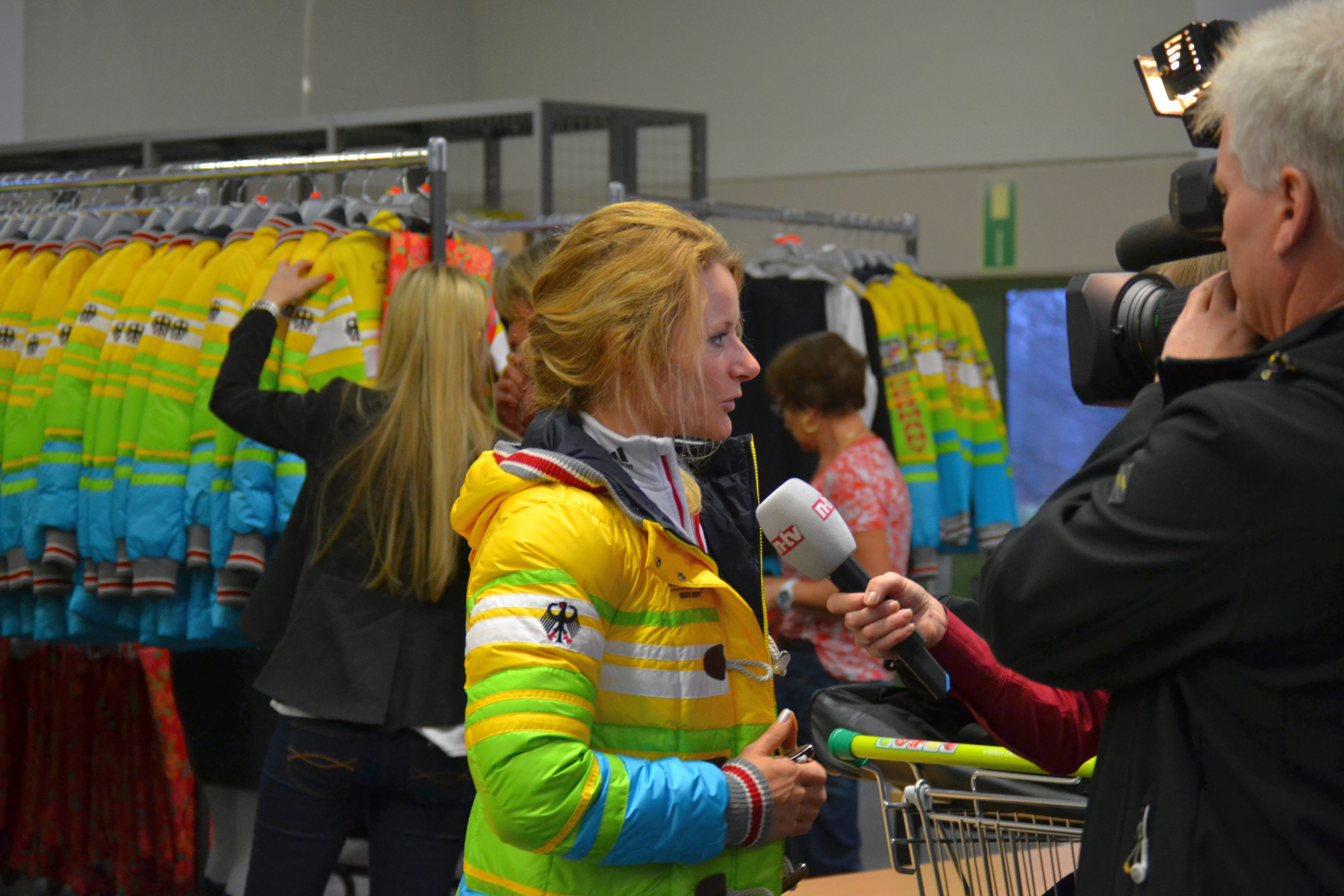
Claudia Nystad at the outfitting on media day (20 January) on Erding Air Base

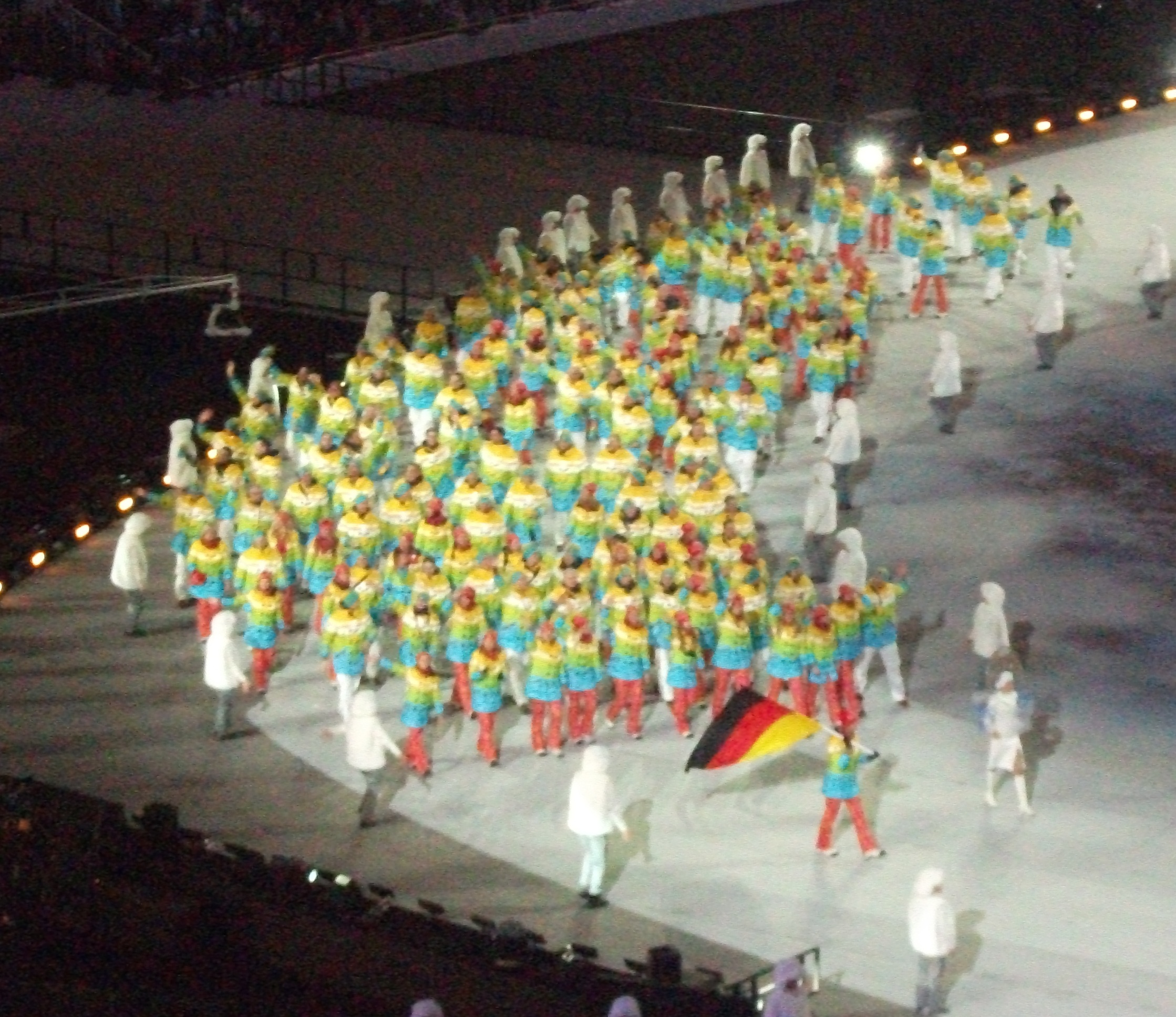
Team Germany at the Opening Ceremony.

Medal	Name	Sport	Event	Date
Gold	Felix Loch	Luge	Men's singles	9 February
Gold	Maria Höfl-Riesch	Alpine skiing	Women's combined	10 February
Gold	Natalie Geisenberger	Luge	Women's singles	11 February
Gold	Carina Vogt	Ski jumping	Women's normal hill individual	11 February
Gold	Eric Frenzel	Nordic combined	Individual normal hill/10 km	12 February
Gold	Tobias Wendl; Tobias Arlt	Luge	Men's doubles	12 February
Gold	Natalie Geisenberger; Felix Loch; Tobias Wendl; Tobias Arlt	Luge	Mixed team relay	13 February
Gold	Severin Freund; Marinus Kraus; Andreas Wank; Andreas Wellinger	Ski jumping	Team large hill	17 February
Gold	Daniel Böhm; Erik Lesser; Arnd Peiffer; Simon Schempp	Biathlon	Men's relay	22 February
Silver	Tatjana Hüfner	Luge	Women's singles	11 February
Silver	Erik Lesser	Biathlon	Men's individual	13 February
Silver	Maria Höfl-Riesch	Alpine skiing	Women's super-G	15 February
Silver	Fabian Rießle; Björn Kircheisen; Johannes Rydzek; Eric Frenzel	Nordic combined	Team large hill/4 × 5 km	20 February
Silver	Anke Karstens	Snowboarding	Women's parallel slalom	22 February
Bronze	Aliona Savchenko; Robin Szolkowy	Figure skating	Pairs	12 February
Bronze	Stefanie Böhler; Nicole Fessel; Denise Herrmann; Claudia Nystad	Cross-country skiing	Women's 4×5 km relay	15 February
Bronze	Viktoria Rebensburg	Alpine skiing	Women's giant slalom	18 February
Bronze	Fabian Rießle	Nordic combined	Individual large hill/10 km	18 February
Bronze	Amelie Kober	Snowboarding	Women's parallel slalom	22 February

== Alpine skiing ==
Germany qualified seven quota places in alpine skiing.

Men

Athlete	Event	Run 1		Run 2		Total	
Athlete	Event	Time	Rank	Time	Rank	Time	Rank
Fritz Dopfer	Giant slalom	1:22.59	11	1:24.38	=17	2:46.97	12
Fritz Dopfer	Slalom	48.46	14	54.26	4	1:42.72	=4
Stefan Luitz	Giant slalom	DSQ					
Stefan Luitz	Slalom	50.79	37	DNF			
Felix Neureuther	Giant slalom	1:22.51	8	1:24.08	=11	2:46.59	8
Felix Neureuther	Slalom	47.57	7	DNF			

Women

Athlete	Event	Run 1		Run 2		Total	
Athlete	Event	Time	Rank	Time	Rank	Time	Rank
Christina Geiger	Slalom	DSQ					
Maria Höfl-Riesch	Downhill	—N/a				1:42.74	13
Maria Höfl-Riesch	Super-G	—N/a				1:26.07	2nd place, silver medalist(s)
Maria Höfl-Riesch	Combined	1:43.72	5	50.90	3	2:34.62	1st place, gold medalist(s)
Maria Höfl-Riesch	Giant slalom	DNS					
Maria Höfl-Riesch	Slalom	53.11	2	52.62	9	1:45.73	4
Viktoria Rebensburg	Downhill	—N/a				1:42.76	15
Viktoria Rebensburg	Super-G	—N/a				1:27.08	9
Viktoria Rebensburg	Giant slalom	1:19.24	6	1:17.90	1	2:37.14	3rd place, bronze medalist(s)
Barbara Wirth	Giant slalom	1:21.35	21	1:20.38	27	2:41.73	25
Barbara Wirth	Slalom	56.31	16	52.69	11	1:49.00	14

== Biathlon ==
Based on their performance at the 2012 and 2013 Biathlon World Championships, Germany qualified 6 men and 6 women.

Men

Athlete	Event	Time	Misses	Rank
Andreas Birnbacher	Individual	52:17.9	2 (1+0+0+1)	22
Daniel Böhm	Individual	51:09.4	1 (0+1+0+0)	10
Erik Lesser	Sprint	25:26.7	1 (0+1)	21
Erik Lesser	Pursuit	34:53.1	3 (1+1+0+1)	16
Erik Lesser	Individual	49:43.9	0 (0+0+0+0)	2nd place, silver medalist(s)
Erik Lesser	Mass start	45:34.2	4 (0+0+2+2)	26
Arnd Peiffer	Sprint	26:01.2	3 (2+1)	34
Arnd Peiffer	Pursuit	34:53.1	1 (0+0+1+0)	19
Arnd Peiffer	Mass start	44:35.0	4 (0+1+2+1)	18
Simon Schempp	Sprint	25:16.4	0 (0+0)	15
Simon Schempp	Pursuit	34:14.5	1 (0+0+0+1)	6
Simon Schempp	Individual	51:50.3	1 (0+1+0+0)	16
Simon Schempp	Mass start	43:48.3	3 (2+1+0+0)	13
Christoph Stephan	Sprint	26:55.4	2 (1+1)	58
Christoph Stephan	Pursuit	37:18.8	1 (0+0+0+1)	43
Daniel Böhm; Erik Lesser; Arnd Peiffer; Simon Schempp	Team relay	1:12:19.4	2 (0+2)	1st place, gold medalist(s)

Women

Athlete	Event	Time	Misses	Rank
Laura Dahlmeier	Sprint	23:03.2	2 (0+2)	46
Laura Dahlmeier	Pursuit	32:38.8	1 (0+0+0+1)	30
Laura Dahlmeier	Individual	46:45.7	1 (1+0+0+0)	13
Andrea Henkel	Sprint	22:01.5	1 (0+1)	22
Andrea Henkel	Pursuit	32:30.4	3 (0+1+1+1)	29
Andrea Henkel	Mass start	37:19.2	1 (0+0+1+0)	17
Franziska Hildebrand	Individual	49:06.4	2 (0+2+0+0)	38
Franziska Hildebrand	Mass start	39:09.5	3 (1+0+1+1)	28
Franziska Preuß	Sprint	22:53.1	2 (2+0)	41
Franziska Preuß	Pursuit	33:34.0	3 (0+2+1+0)	40
Franziska Preuß	Individual	DNF	5 (2+3)	DNF
Evi Sachenbacher-Stehle	Sprint	21:40.8	1 (0+1)	11
Evi Sachenbacher-Stehle	Pursuit	32:16.6	6 (2+1+1+2)	27
Evi Sachenbacher-Stehle	Individual	47:30.4	3 (3+0+0+0)	20
Evi Sachenbacher-Stehle	Mass start	35:25.6	0 (0+0+0+0)	DSQ
Laura Dahlmeier; Andrea Henkel; Franziska Hildebrand; Franziska Preuß	Team relay	1:13:44.2	6 (0+6)	11

Mixed

Athlete	Event	Time	Misses	Rank
Evi Sachenbacher-Stehle; Laura Dahlmeier; Daniel Böhm; Simon Schempp	Team relay	1:10:58.3	9 (0+9)	DSQ

== Bobsleigh ==
Men

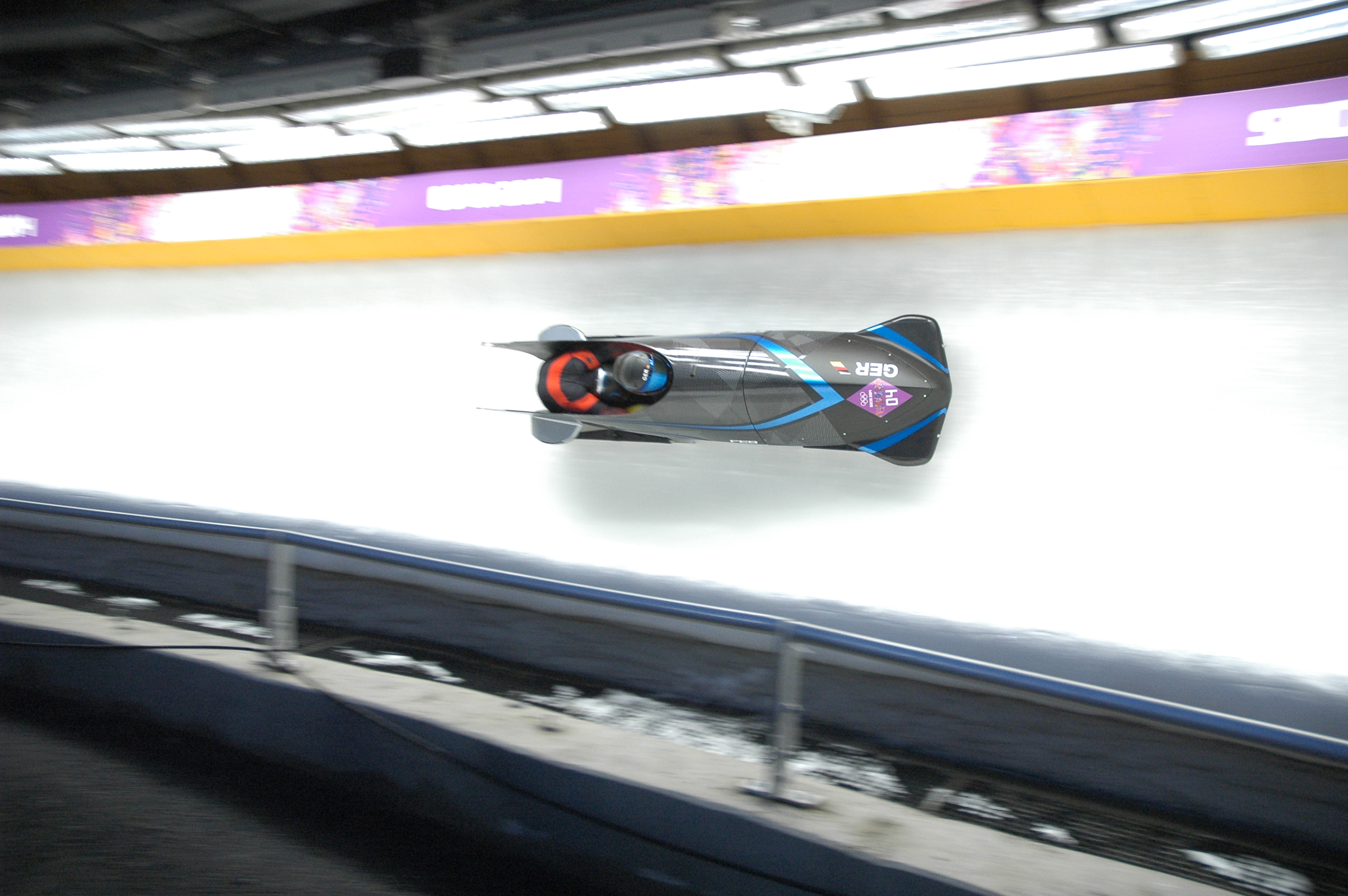
GER-1 two-man sled

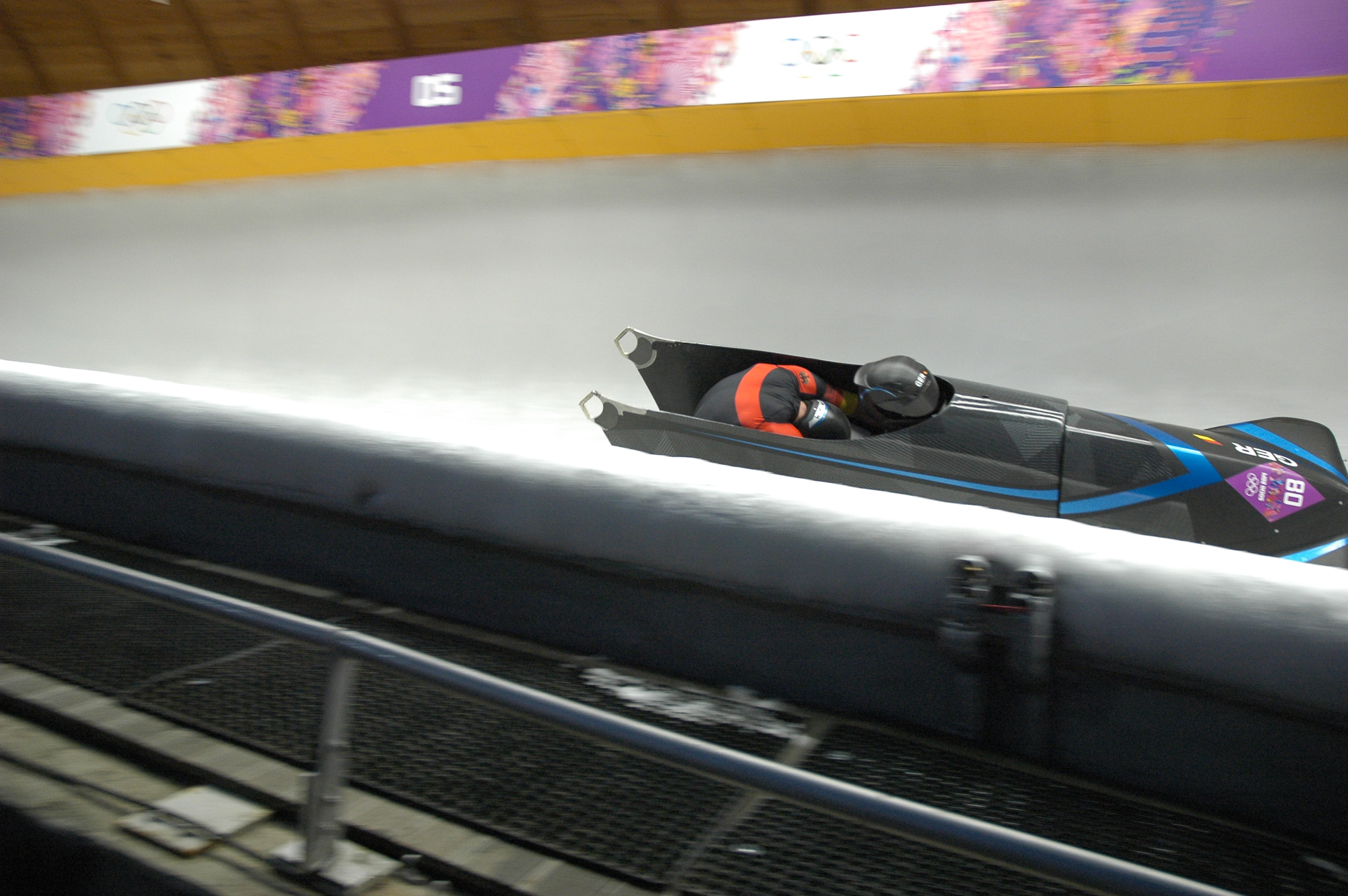
GER-2 two-man sled

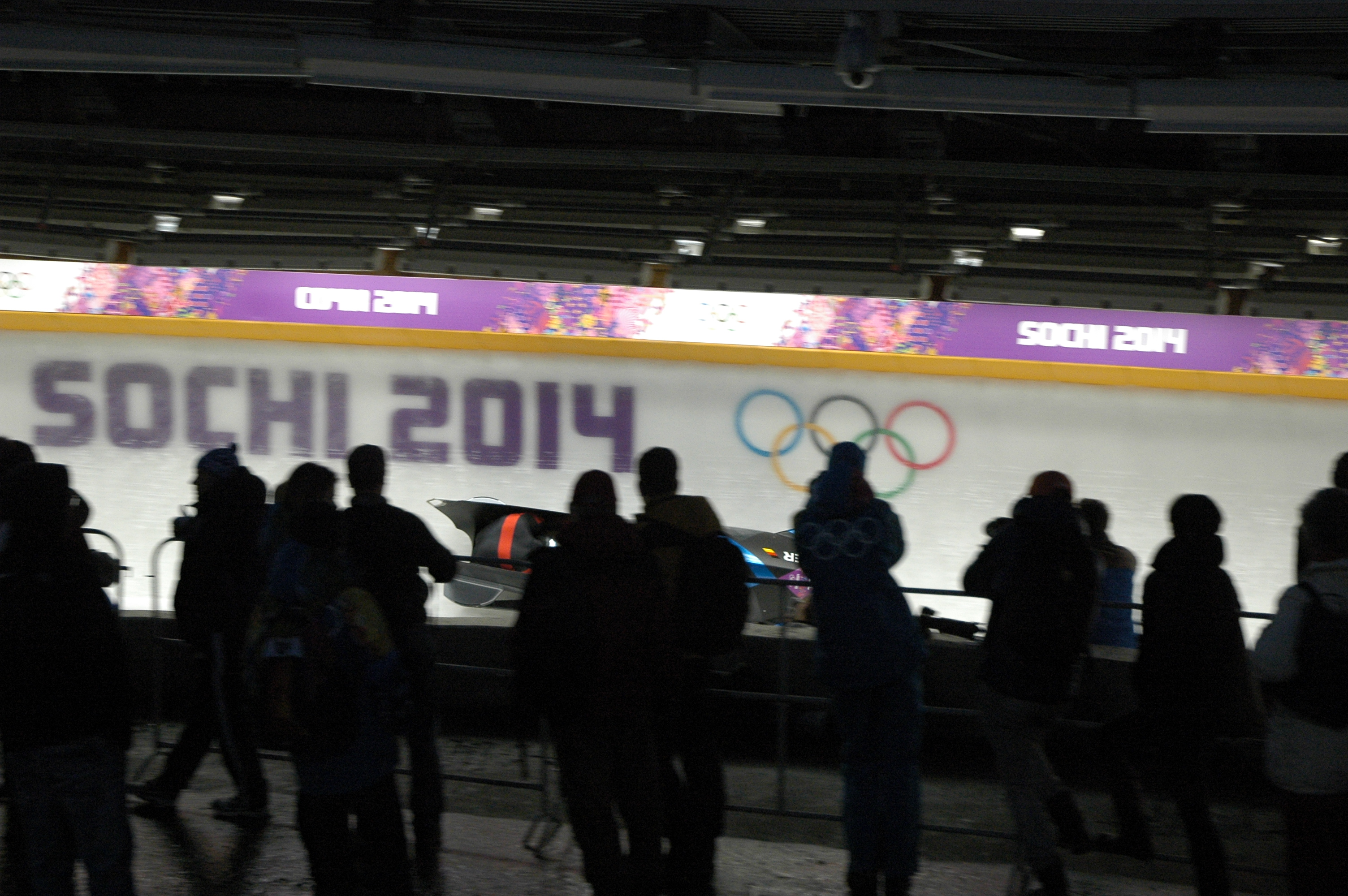
GER-3 two-man sled

Athlete	Event	Run 1		Run 2		Run 3		Run 4		Total	
Athlete	Event	Time	Rank	Time	Rank	Time	Rank	Time	Rank	Time	Rank
Maximilian Arndt*; Alexander Rödiger	Two-man	56.98	14	56.92	12	57.22	16	57.08	=16	3:48.20	15
Jannis Bäcker; Francesco Friedrich*	Two-man	56.50	5	56.88	10	56.63	9	56.84	=10	3:46.85	8
Thomas Florschütz*; Kevin Kuske	Two-man	56.63	9	56.89	11	56.77	11	56.71	5	3:47.00	11
Maximilian Arndt*; Marco Hübenbecker; Martin Putze; Alexander Rödiger	Four-man	54.88	1	55.47	=7	55.47	4	55.60	=7	3:41.42	4
Jannis Bäcker; Gregor Bermbach; Francesco Friedrich*; Thorsten Margis	Four-man	55.15	5	55.43	=5	55.81	8	55.41	5	3:41.80	8
Joshua Bluhm; Thomas Florschütz*; Kevin Kuske; Christian Poser	Four-man	55.06	2	55.42	4	55.50	5	55.53	6	3:41.51	5

* – Denotes the driver of each sled

Women

Athlete	Event	Run 1		Run 2		Run 3		Run 4		Total	
Athlete	Event	Time	Rank	Time	Rank	Time	Rank	Time	Rank	Time	Rank
Franziska Fritz; Sandra Kiriasis*	Two-woman	57.95	6	58.08	5	58.06	4	58.20	6	3:52.29	5
Cathleen Martini*; Christin Senkel	Two-woman	57.99	7	58.42	11	58.17	5	58.13	=3	3:52.71	7
Stephanie Schneider; Anja Schneiderheinze-Stöckel*	Two-woman	58.17	9	58.30	8	58.53	11	58.74	12	3:53.74	10

* – Denotes the driver of each sled

== Cross-country skiing ==
Germany had 20 quota places, but only 15 achieved the national criteria.

Distance
Men

Athlete	Event	Classical		Freestyle		Final		
Athlete	Event	Time	Rank	Time	Rank	Time	Deficit	Rank
Tobias Angerer	30 km skiathlon	36:00.6	4	32:17.6	15	1:08:49.7	+34.3	15
Thomas Bing	30 km skiathlon	36:27.7	20	34:34.1	46	1:11:32.9	+3:17.5	37
Thomas Bing	50 km freestyle	—N/a				1:49:56.1	+3:00.9	36
Hannes Dotzler	15 km classical	—N/a				39:49.9	+1:20.2	11
Hannes Dotzler	30 km skiathlon	36:04.3	12	32:09.2	11	1:08:44.8	+29.4	13
Jens Filbrich	15 km classical	—N/a				40:08.5	+1:38.8	14
Erik Lesser	50 km freestyle	—N/a				1:51:55.8	+5:00.6	42
Arnd Peiffer	50 km freestyle	—N/a				1:51:31.5	+4:36.3	40
Axel Teichmann	15 km classical	—N/a				39:42.4	+1:12.7	8
Axel Teichmann	30 km skiathlon	36:20.4	19	33:21.4	32	1:10:13.3	+1:57.9	23
Axel Teichmann	50 km freestyle	—N/a				1:51:03.4	+4:08.2	39
Tim Tscharnke	15 km classical	—N/a				40:41.3	+2:11.6	26
Tobias Angerer; Hannes Dotzler; Jens Filbrich; Axel Teichmann	4×10 km relay	—N/a				1:31:18.8	+2:36.8	9

Women

Athlete	Event	Classical		Freestyle		Final		
Athlete	Event	Time	Rank	Time	Rank	Time	Deficit	Rank
Stefanie Böhler	10 km classical	—N/a				29:04.3	+46.5	6
Stefanie Böhler	15 km skiathlon	20:00.8	26	20:39.7	37	41:20.0	+2:46.4	35
Nicole Fessel	10 km classical	—N/a				30:27.0	+2:09.2	21
Nicole Fessel	15 km skiathlon	19:24.8	9	20:09.3	26	40:11.4	+1:37.8	14
Nicole Fessel	30 km freestyle	—N/a				DNF		
Claudia Nystad	15 km skiathlon	20:40.7	44	20:52.0	42	42:08.8	+3:35.2	43
Katrin Zeller	10 km classical	—N/a				30:38.5	+2:20.7	25
Katrin Zeller	15 km skiathlon	19:57.6	23	20:16.7	29	40:49.7	+2:16.1	26
Katrin Zeller	30 km freestyle	—N/a				1:12:41.4	+1:36.2	12
Stefanie Böhler; Nicole Fessel; Denise Herrmann; Claudia Nystad	4×5 km relay	—N/a				53:03.6	+0.9	3rd place, bronze medalist(s)

Sprint
Men

Athlete	Event	Qualification		Quarterfinal		Semifinal		Final	
Athlete	Event	Time	Rank	Time	Rank	Time	Rank	Time	Rank
Thomas Bing	Sprint	3:38.30	32	did not advance					
Sebastian Eisenlauer	Sprint	3:39.00	35	did not advance					
Tim Tscharnke	Sprint	3:37.75	28 Q	3:46.81	4	did not advance			
Josef Wenzl	Sprint	3:38.10	31	did not advance					
Hannes Dotzler; Tim Tscharnke	Team sprint	—N/a				23:36.23	1 Q	23:57.02	7

Women

Athlete	Event	Qualification		Quarterfinal		Semifinal		Final	
Athlete	Event	Time	Rank	Time	Rank	Time	Rank	Time	Rank
Lucia Anger	Sprint	2:40.22	31	did not advance					
Denise Herrmann	Sprint	2:35.11	8 Q	2:34.87	1 Q	2:36.94	4	did not advance	
Hanna Kolb	Sprint	2:40.17	30 Q	2:38.43	6	did not advance			
Claudia Nystad	Sprint	2:41.13	35	did not advance					
Stefanie Böhler; Denise Herrmann	Team sprint	—N/a				16:58.98	4 q	16:24.97	4

== Curling ==
Germany qualified a men's team by winning the final qualification tournament.

Summary

Team	Event	Group stage										Semifinal	Final / BM	
Team	Event	Opposition Score	Opposition Score	Opposition Score	Opposition Score	Opposition Score	Opposition Score	Opposition Score	Opposition Score	Opposition Score	Rank	Opposition Score	Opposition Score	Rank
John Jahr; Christopher Bartsch; Sven Goldemann; Peter Rickmers; Felix Schulze	Men's tournament	CAN; L 8–11	GBR; L 6–7	NOR; L 5–8	CHN; L 7–11	USA; L 5–8	SUI; W 8–7	SWE; L 4–8	DEN; L 3–6	RUS; L 7–8	10	Did not advance		

=== Men's tournament ===
Preliminary round

Final round robin standings
Team	Skip	Pld	W	L	PF	PA	EW	EL	BE	SE	S%	Qualification
Sweden	Niklas Edin	9	8	1	60	44	38	30	18	8	86%	Playoffs
Canada	Brad Jacobs	9	7	2	69	53	39	36	14	7	84%	Playoffs
China	Liu Rui	9	7	2	67	50	41	37	11	5	85%	Playoffs
Norway	Thomas Ulsrud	9	5	4	52	53	36	33	18	5	86%	Tiebreaker
Great Britain	David Murdoch	9	5	4	51	49	37	35	15	8	83%	Tiebreaker
Denmark	Rasmus Stjerne	9	4	5	54	61	32	37	17	4	81%	
Russia	Andrey Drozdov	9	3	6	58	70	36	38	13	7	77%	
Switzerland	Sven Michel	9	3	6	47	46	31	34	22	7	83%	
United States	John Shuster	9	2	7	47	58	30	39	14	7	80%	
Germany	John Jahr	9	1	8	53	74	38	39	10	9	76%	

Round-robin

Draw 1

Monday, February 10, 9:00 am

Sheet D	1	2	3	4	5	6	7	8	9	10	Final
Germany (Jahr)	0	2	2	0	0	1	0	1	2	0	8
Canada (Jacobs) 🔨	2	0	0	3	2	0	2	0	0	2	11

Draw 3

Tuesday, February 11, 2:00 pm

Sheet C	1	2	3	4	5	6	7	8	9	10	Final
Great Britain (Murdoch) 🔨	1	0	0	0	2	0	2	0	1	1	7
Germany (Jahr)	0	1	1	1	0	2	0	1	0	0	6

Draw 4

Wednesday, February 12, 9:00 am

Sheet B	1	2	3	4	5	6	7	8	9	10	Final
Norway (Ulsrud) 🔨	2	0	0	0	2	0	1	0	0	3	8
Germany (Jahr)	0	0	1	0	0	2	0	0	2	0	5

Draw 5

Wednesday, February 12, 7:00 pm

Sheet A	1	2	3	4	5	6	7	8	9	10	Final
Germany (Jahr)	0	1	0	2	0	2	1	0	1	0	7
China (Liu) 🔨	2	0	3	0	2	0	0	1	0	3	11

Draw 7

Friday, February 14, 9:00 am

Sheet C	1	2	3	4	5	6	7	8	9	10	Final
United States (Shuster)	0	0	4	0	0	0	4	0	0	X	8
Germany (Jahr) 🔨	0	1	0	1	0	1	0	1	1	X	5

Draw 8

Friday, February 14, 7:00 pm

Sheet D	1	2	3	4	5	6	7	8	9	10	Final
Switzerland (Michel)	1	0	2	0	1	0	0	2	0	1	7
Germany (Jahr) 🔨	0	2	0	1	0	2	1	0	2	0	8

Draw 9

Saturday, February 15, 2:00 pm

Sheet A	1	2	3	4	5	6	7	8	9	10	Final
Sweden (Edin) 🔨	0	1	0	2	2	0	1	0	2	X	8
Germany (Jahr)	0	0	1	0	0	2	0	1	0	X	4

Draw 11

Sunday, February 16, 7:00 pm

Sheet C	1	2	3	4	5	6	7	8	9	10	Final
Germany (Jahr)	0	0	2	0	0	1	0	0	0	X	3
Denmark (Stjerne) 🔨	0	2	0	1	0	0	2	0	1	X	6

Draw 12

Monday, February 17, 2:00 pm

Sheet B	1	2	3	4	5	6	7	8	9	10	Final
Germany (Jahr)	0	0	2	0	2	0	1	0	1	1	7
Russia (Drozdov) 🔨	2	0	0	2	0	2	0	2	0	0	8

== Figure skating ==
Germany will compete in all events.

Athlete	Event	SP/OD		FS/FD		Total	
Athlete	Event	Points	Rank	Points	Rank	Points	Rank
Peter Liebers	Men's singles	86.04	5 Q	153.83	9	239.87	8
Nathalie Weinzierl	Ladies' singles	57.63	10 Q	89.73	21	147.36	18
Aliona Savchenko / Robin Szolkowy	Pairs	79.64	2 Q	136.14	4	215.78	3rd place, bronze medalist(s)
Maylin Wende / Daniel Wende	Pairs	59.25	12 Q	107.00	13	166.25	13
Tanja Kolbe / Stefano Caruso	Ice dancing	54.43	19 Q	76.13	19	130.56	19
Nelli Zhiganshina / Alexander Gazsi	Ice dancing	60.91	10 Q	89.86	12	150.77	11

Team trophy

Athlete	Event	Short program/Short dance						Free skate/Free dance					
Athlete	Event	Men's	Ladies'	Pairs	Ice dance	Total		Men's	Ladies'	Pairs	Ice dance	Total	
Athlete	Event	Points Team points	Points Team points	Points Team points	Points Team points	Points	Rank	Points Team points	Points Team points	Points Team points	Points Team points	Points	Rank
Peter Liebers (M); Nathalie Weinzierl (L); Maylin Wende / Daniel Wende (P); Nelli Zhiganshina / Alexander Gazsi (ID)	Team trophy	79.61; 5	52.16; 2	60.82; 5	58.04; 5	17	8	did not advance					

== Freestyle skiing ==
Halfpipe

Athlete	Event	Qualification				Final			
Athlete	Event	Run 1	Run 2	Best	Rank	Run 1	Run 2	Best	Rank
Sabrina Cakmakli	Women's halfpipe	64.80	16.60	64.80	14	Did not advance			

Moguls

Athlete	Event	Qualification								Final											
Athlete	Event	Run 1				Run 2				Run 1				Run 2				Run 3			
Athlete	Event	Time	Points	Total	Rank	Time	Points	Total	Rank	Time	Points	Total	Rank	Time	Points	Total	Rank	Time	Points	Total	Rank
Laura Grasemann	Women's moguls	37.72	3.54	6.81	26	33.46	11.10	15.76	12	did not advance											

Ski cross

Athlete	Event	Seeding		Round of 16	Quarterfinal	Semifinal	Final	
Athlete	Event	Time	Rank	Position	Position	Position	Position	Rank
Daniel Bohnacker	Men's ski cross	1:17.59	13	3	did not advance			19
Florian Eigler	Men's ski cross	1:18.91	26	2 Q	2 Q	3 FB	4	8
Thomas Fischer	Men's ski cross	1:18.06	19	2 Q	DNF	did not advance		16
Andreas Schauer	Men's ski cross	DNF	31	2 Q	3	did not advance		12
Anna Wörner	Women's ski cross	1:22.95	9	2 Q	3	did not advance		9
Heidi Zacher	Women's ski cross	1:24.24	15	3	did not advance			18

Qualification legend: FA – Qualify to medal round; FB – Qualify to consolation round

Slopestyle

Athlete	Event	Qualification				Final			
Athlete	Event	Run 1	Run 2	Best	Rank	Run 1	Run 2	Best	Rank
Benedikt Mayr	Men's slopestyle	67.60	7.20	67.60	20	did not advance			
Lisa Zimmermann	Women's slopestyle	20.00	67.20	67.20	14	did not advance			

== Ice hockey ==
Germany qualified a women's team by winning a qualification tournament.

Summary

Key:

- OT – Overtime
- GWS – Match decided by penalty-shootout

Team	Event	Group stage				Semifinal	Final / BM	
Team	Event	Opposition Score	Opposition Score	Opposition Score	Rank	Opposition Score	Opposition Score	Rank
Germany women's	Women's tournament	Russia; L 1–4	Sweden; L 0–4	Japan; W 4–0	3	5th-8th place semifinal Finland; L 1–2	7th place game Japan; W 3–2	7

=== Women's tournament ===
On 15 January 2014, head coach Klaus Kathan nominated the following roster:

No.	Pos.	Name	Height	Weight	Birthdate	Birthplace	2013–14 team
3	F	Sophie Kratzer	171 cm (5 ft 7 in)	74 kg (163 lb)	20 April 1989	Landshut	(Germany) ESC Planegg-Würmtal (DFEL)
4	D	Jessica Hammerl	161 cm (5 ft 3 in)	63 kg (139 lb)	10 July 1988	Landshut	(Germany) TSV Erding II (EBB)
5	F	Manuela Anwander	164 cm (5 ft 5 in)	68 kg (150 lb)	9 January 1992	Gräfelfing	(Germany) ERC Ingolstadt (DFEL)
6	D	Bettina Evers	167 cm (5 ft 6 in)	70 kg (150 lb)	17 August 1981	Hannover	(Germany) ESC Planegg-Würmtal (DFEL)
7	F	Nina Kamenik	161 cm (5 ft 3 in)	57 kg (126 lb)	27 April 1985	Berlin	(Germany) OSC Berlin (DFEL)
8	F	Julia Zorn	170 cm (5 ft 7 in)	73 kg (161 lb)	6 February 1990	Gräfelfing	(Germany) ESC Planegg-Würmtal (DFEL)
10	D	Anja Weisser	174 cm (5 ft 9 in)	74 kg (163 lb)	2 October 1991	Marktoberdorf	(Canada) University of Prince Edward Island (CIS)
12	D	Susann Götz	163 cm (5 ft 4 in)	65 kg (143 lb)	14 December 1982	Bad Muskau	(Germany) OSC Berlin (DFEL)
13	G	Ivonne Schröder	177 cm (5 ft 10 in)	67 kg (148 lb)	25 July 1988	Bad Muskau	(Germany) ELV Tornado Niesky (OLO)
14	F	Jacqueline Janzen	178 cm (5 ft 10 in)	83 kg (183 lb)	29 November 1993	Villingen	(Germany) ECDC Memmingen Indians (DFEL)
15	F	Andrea Lanzl	162 cm (5 ft 4 in)	67 kg (148 lb)	8 October 1987	Starnberg	(Germany) ERC Ingolstadt (DFEL)
17	F	Sara Seiler	169 cm (5 ft 7 in)	65 kg (143 lb)	25 January 1983	Hausham	(Germany) ERC Ingolstadt (DFEL)
18	D	Susanne Fellner	159 cm (5 ft 3 in)	59 kg (130 lb)	26 February 1985	Ravensburg	(Germany) ECDC Memmingen Indians (DFEL)
22	F	Kerstin Spielberger	169 cm (5 ft 7 in)	61 kg (134 lb)	14 December 1995	Burghausen	(Germany) EHC Klostersee U18 (JBL)
23	D	Tanja Eisenschmid	170 cm (5 ft 7 in)	63 kg (139 lb)	20 April 1993	Marktoberdorf	(United States) University of North Dakota (NCAA)
24	D	Lisa Schuster	169 cm (5 ft 7 in)	70 kg (150 lb)	28 May 1987	Munich	(Germany) OSC Berlin (DFEL)
25	F	Franziska Busch	163 cm (5 ft 4 in)	68 kg (150 lb)	20 October 1985	Seesen	(Germany) ECDC Memmingen Indians (DFEL)
26	F	Monika Bittner	156 cm (5 ft 1 in)	59 kg (130 lb)	29 January 1988	Peißenberg	(Germany) ESC Planegg-Würmtal (DFEL)
27	G	Viona Harrer	169 cm (5 ft 7 in)	55 kg (121 lb)	5 November 1986	Rosenheim	(Germany) EC Bad Tölz (OLS)
30	G	Jennifer Harß	175 cm (5 ft 9 in)	65 kg (143 lb)	14 July 1987	Füssen	(Germany) ERC Sonthofen (EBL)
81	F	Maritta Becker	168 cm (5 ft 6 in)	63 kg (139 lb)	11 March 1981	Heilbronn	(Germany) ERC Ingolstadt (DFEL)

Preliminary round Group B

Team	Pld	W	OTW	OTL	L	GF	GA	GD	Pts	Qualification
Russia	3	3	0	0	0	9	3	+6	9	Quarterfinals
Sweden	3	2	0	0	1	6	3	+3	6	Quarterfinals
Germany	3	1	0	0	2	5	8	−3	3	5–8th place semifinals
Japan	3	0	0	0	3	1	7	−6	0	5–8th place semifinals

Source: IIHF

9 February 2014; 17:00	Russia	4–1 (0–0, 0–1, 4–0)	Germany	Shayba Arena, Sochi; Attendance: 5,048

Game reference

Yulia Leskina
Goalies
Viona Harrer
Referee:
(Finland) Anna Eskola
Linesmen:
(United States) Laura Johnson
(Czech Republic) Ilona Novotná

	0–1	26:48 – F. Busch (M. Anwander)
I. Gavrilova (A. Khomich, Y. Smolentseva) – 45:04	1–1
O. Sosina (I. Dyubanok, T. Burina) (PP) – 48:49	2–1
Y. Smolentseva (A. Shibanova) – 49:27	3–1
O. Sosina (I. Dyubanok, Y. Smolentseva) – 52:15	4–1

4 min
Penalties
8 min
37
Shots
15

11 February 2014; 14:00	Germany	0–4 (0–1, 0–0, 0–3)	Sweden	Shayba Arena, Sochi; Attendance: 4,015

Game reference

Jennifer Harß
Goalies
Kim Martin Hasson
Referee:
(Norway) Aina Hove
Linesmen:
(Canada) Stephanie Gagnon
(Slovakia) Michaela Kúdelová

0–1	01:00 – E. Nordin (E. Eliasson, E. Grahm)
0–2	47:42 – C. Östberg (A. Borgqvist)
0–3	50:31 – J. Olofsson (C. Östberg, M. Löwenhielm)
0–4	51:35 – P. Winberg (A. Borgqvist)

4 min
Penalties
10 min
21
Shots
29

13 February 2014; 12:00	Japan	0–4 (0–1, 0–1, 0–2)	Germany	Shayba Arena, Sochi; Attendance: 2,618

Game reference

Nana Fujimoto
Goalies
Viona Harrer
Referee:
(Canada) Melanie Bordeleau
Linesmen:
(Sweden) Therese Bjorkman
(France) Carlotte Girard

0–1	13:23 – M. Anwander (S. Kratzer, M. Becker) (PP)
0–2	20:48 – F. Busch (A. Lanzl)
0–3	58:31 – K. Spielberger (T. Eisenschmid, N. Kamenik)
0–4	59:28 – F. Busch (S. Gotz)

8 min
Penalties
10 min
30
Shots
25

5–8th place semifinal

16 February 2014; 12:00	Finland	2–1 (2–0, 0–1, 0–0)	Germany	Shayba Arena, Sochi; Attendance: 2,009

Game reference

Noora Räty
Goalies
Jennifer Harß
Referee:
(Norway) Aina Hove
Linesmen:
(Slovakia) Michaela Kúdeľová
(Czech Republic) Zuzana Svobodová

J. Hiirikoski (R. Välilä) (PP) – 01:15	1–0
M. Karvinen (R. Välilä, S. Tapani) – 08:32	2–0
	2–1	28:59 – B. Evers (S. Götz) (PP)

8 min
Penalties
8 min
27
Shots
21

Seventh place game

18 February 2014; 12:00	Germany	3–2 (1–1, 2–0, 0–1)	Japan	Shayba Arena, Sochi; Attendance: 2,012

Game reference

Viona Harrer
Goalies
Nana Fujimoto
Akane Konishi
Referee:
(Canada) Melanie Bordeleau
Linesmen:
(Sweden) Therese Bjorkman
(Slovakia) Michaela Kúdeľová

S. Götz (F. Busch, J. Janzen) (PP) – 09:18	1–0
	1–1	13:04 – H. Kubo (C. Osawa)
J. Zorn (F. Busch, S. Götz) – (PP) 24:30	2–1
S. Seiler (L. Schuster, S. Kratzer) – 35:49	3–1
	3–2	42:56 – H. Yoneyama (H. Kubo, S. Suzuki)

8 min
Penalties
12 min
23
Shots
29

== Luge ==
Germany earned the maximum quota of ten spots.

Men

Athlete	Event	Run 1		Run 2		Run 3		Run 4		Total	
Athlete	Event	Time	Rank	Time	Rank	Time	Rank	Time	Rank	Time	Rank
Andi Langenhan	Singles	52.707	8	52.480	4	52.073	7	52.095	4	3:29.355	4
Felix Loch	Singles	52.185	2	51.964	1	51.613	1	51.764	1	3:27.526	1st place, gold medalist(s)
David Möller	Singles	52.781	13	52.865	16	52.312	14	52.281	15	3:30.239	14
Tobias Wendl; Tobias Arlt	Doubles	49.373	1	49.560	1	—N/a				1:38.933	1st place, gold medalist(s)
Toni Eggert; Sascha Benecken	Doubles	50.274	10	49.944	4	—N/a				1:40.218	8

Women

Athlete	Event	Run 1		Run 2		Run 3		Run 4		Total	
Athlete	Event	Time	Rank	Time	Rank	Time	Rank	Time	Rank	Time	Rank
Natalie Geisenberger	Singles	49.891	1	49.923	1	49.765	1	50.189	1	3:19.768	1st place, gold medalist(s)
Tatjana Hüfner	Singles	50.393	3	50.187	2	50.048	2	50.279	2	3:20.907	2nd place, silver medalist(s)
Anke Wischnewski	Singles	50.490	7	50.476	9	50.462	7	50.532	7	3:21.960	6

Mixed team relay

Athlete	Event	Run 1		Run 2		Run 3		Total	
Athlete	Event	Time	Rank	Time	Rank	Time	Rank	Time	Rank
Tobias Arlt; Natalie Geisenberger; Felix Loch; Tobias Wendl	Team relay	54.095	1	55.639	1	55.915	1	2:45.649	1st place, gold medalist(s)

== Nordic combined ==
Germany qualified a maximum of five athletes and a spot in the team relay.

Athlete	Event	Ski jumping			Cross-country		Total	
Athlete	Event	Distance	Points	Rank	Time	Rank	Time	Rank
Tino Edelmann	Normal hill/10 km	98.0	124.0	=5	23:57.2	16	24:27.2	9
Eric Frenzel	Normal hill/10 km	103.0	131.5	1	23:50.2	12	23:50.2	1st place, gold medalist(s)
Eric Frenzel	Large hill/10 km	139.5	129.0	1	23:57.9	30	23:57.9	10
Björn Kircheisen	Large hill/10 km	129.0	113.2	11	22:26.6	4	23:29.6	4
Fabian Rießle	Normal hill/10 km	95.5	116.5	19	23:19.6	6	24:19.6	8
Fabian Rießle	Large hill/10 km	130.0	115.1	9	22:33.1	8	23:29.1	3rd place, bronze medalist(s)
Johannes Rydzek	Normal hill/10 km	98.0	121.2	12	23:26.5	8	24:07.5	6
Johannes Rydzek	Large hill/10 km	129.5	112.7	12	22:46.4	13	23:51.4	8
Fabian Rießle; Björn Kircheisen; Johannes Rydzek; Eric Frenzel	Team large hill/4×5 km	516.5	481.7	1	47:13.8	3	47:13.8	2nd place, silver medalist(s)

== Short track speed skating ==
Germany qualified 1 man and 1 woman during World Cup 3 and 4 in November 2013.

Men

Athlete	Event	Heat		Quarterfinal		Semifinal		Final	
Athlete	Event	Time	Rank	Time	Rank	Time	Rank	Time	Rank
Robert Seifert	500 m	41.624	3	did not advance					17
Robert Seifert	1000 m	1:29.468	4	did not advance					29
Robert Seifert	1500 m	2:16.555	4	—N/a		did not advance			22

Women

Athlete	Event	Heat		Semifinal		Final	
Athlete	Event	Time	Rank	Time	Rank	Time	Rank
Anna Seidel	1500 m	2:25.700	3 Q	2:20.405	5	Did not advance	17

Qualification legend: ADV – Advanced due to being impeded by another skater; FA – Qualify to medal round; FB – Qualify to consolation round

== Skeleton ==
Athlete	Event	Run 1		Run 2		Run 3		Run 4		Total	
Athlete	Event	Time	Rank	Time	Rank	Time	Rank	Time	Rank	Time	Rank
Alexander Kröckel	Men's	57.21	8	57.36	17	57.03	10	56.69	4	3:48.29	9
Frank Rommel	Men's	57.19	7	56.95	5	57.33	15	57.00	13	3:48.47	11
Sophia Griebel	Women's	59.43	11	59.20	9	58.74	13	58.75	17	3:56.12	10
Anja Huber	Women's	59.17	8	59.13	7	58.63	9	58.31	5	3:55.24	8
Marion Thees	Women's	59.25	9	59.42	15	58.89	18	58.67	15	3:56.23	13

== Ski jumping ==
Germany qualified nine quota places in ski jumping.

Men

Athlete	Event	Qualification			First round			Final			Total	
Athlete	Event	Distance	Points	Rank	Distance	Points	Rank	Distance	Points	Rank	Points	Rank
Richard Freitag	Normal hill	94.0	114.4	=16 Q	100.5	121.4	26 Q	97.5	122.3	16	243.7	20
Richard Freitag	Large hill	118.5	104.4	21 Q	122.5	118.6	22 Q	126.5	123.5	17	242.1	21
Severin Freund	Normal hill	BYE			99.5	108.9	44 QR	93.5	108.8	30	217.7	31
Severin Freund	Large hill	BYE			138.0	140.2	3 Q	129.5	132.0	6	272.2	4
Marinus Kraus	Large hill	130.0	120.2	4 Q	131.0	117.7	24 Q	140.0	139.7	2	257.4	6
Andreas Wank	Normal hill	102.5	127.9	2 Q	101.0	132.6	=5 Q	97.0	120.8	19	253.4	10
Andreas Wellinger	Normal hill	BYE			96.0	125.8	14 Q	101.5	131.3	2	257.1	6
Andreas Wellinger	Large hill	BYE			117.0	96.6	45	did not advance				
Severin Freund; Marinus Kraus; Andreas Wank; Andreas Wellinger	Team large hill	—N/a			533.0	519.0	1 Q	528.0	522.1	2	1041.1	1st place, gold medalist(s)

Women

Athlete	Event	First round			Final			Total	
Athlete	Event	Distance	Points	Rank	Distance	Points	Rank	Points	Rank
Katharina Althaus	Normal hill	90.5	103.2	24	92.5	108.6	17	211.8	23
Gianina Ernst	Normal hill	90.5	100.3	27	87.5	92.4	29	192.7	28
Ulrike Gräßler	Normal hill	94.0	110.5	21	91.5	104.4	24	214.9	22
Carina Vogt	Normal hill	103.0	126.8	1	97.5	120.6	5	247.4	1st place, gold medalist(s)

== Snowboarding ==
Alpine
Men

Athlete	Event	Qualification		Round of 16	Quarterfinal	Semifinal	Final	
Athlete	Event	Time	Rank	Opposition Time	Opposition Time	Opposition Time	Opposition Time	Rank
Stefan Baumeister	Giant slalom	1:40.72	20	did not advance				
Stefan Baumeister	Slalom	59.72	14 Q	Mathies (AUT); L +0.45	did not advance			
Alexander Bergmann	Giant slalom	1:38.49	11 Q	Flander (SLO); L −0.34	did not advance			
Alexander Bergmann	Slalom	1:00.60	24	did not advance				
Patrick Bussler	Giant slalom	1:36.94	3 Q	Morison (CAN); W −0.30	Flander (SLO); W −0.40	Wild (RUS); L +2.61	Košir (SLO); L +2.26	4
Patrick Bussler	Slalom	59.01	5 Q	Marguč (SLO); W −0.84	Karl (AUT); L +0.15	did not advance		

Women

Athlete	Event	Qualification		Round of 16	Quarterfinal	Semifinal	Final	
Athlete	Event	Time	Rank	Opposition Time	Opposition Time	Opposition Time	Opposition Time	Rank
Selina Jörg	Giant slalom	1:49.26	11 Q	Zavarzina (RUS); L +13.53	did not advance			
Selina Jörg	Slalom	1:04.47	7 Q	Karstens (GER); L+0.02	did not advance			
Anke Karstens	Giant slalom	1:59.29	25	did not advance				
Anke Karstens	Slalom	1:05.14	10 Q	Jörg (GER); W −0.02	Ledecká (CZE); W −0.30	Kober (GER); W −0.09	Dujmovits (AUT); L +0.12	2nd place, silver medalist(s)
Amelie Kober	Giant slalom	DSQ		did not advance				
Amelie Kober	Slalom	1:05.46	14 Q	Kummer (SUI); W −0.10	Meschik (AUT); W −0.01	Karstens (GER); L +0.09	Boccacini (ITA); W −0.13	3rd place, bronze medalist(s)
Isabella Laböck	Giant slalom	1:52.01	18	did not advance				
Isabella Laböck	Slalom	1:04.44	6 Q	Meschik (AUT); L +0.24	did not advance			

Halfpipe

Athlete	Event	Qualification				Semifinal				Final			
Athlete	Event	Run 1	Run 2	Best	Rank	Run 1	Run 2	Best	Rank	Run 1	Run 2	Best	Rank
Johannes Hoepfl	Men's halfpipe	61.25	65.50	65.50	22	did not advance							

Qualification Legend: QF – Qualify directly to final; QS – Qualify to semifinal

Snowboard cross

Athlete	Event	Seeding		Round of 16	Quarterfinal	Semifinal	Final	
Athlete	Event	Time	Rank	Position	Position	Position	Position	Rank
Paul Berg	Men's snowboard cross	CAN		1 Q	4	did not advance		=13
Konstantin Schad	Men's snowboard cross	CAN		1 Q	4	did not advance		=13

Qualification legend: FA – Qualify to medal final; FB – Qualify to consolation final

== Speed skating ==
Based on the results from the fall World Cups during the 2013–14 ISU Speed Skating World Cup season, Germany earned the following start quotas:

Men

Athlete	Event	Race 1		Race 2		Final	
Athlete	Event	Time	Rank	Time	Rank	Time	Rank
Alexej Baumgärtner	5000 m	—N/a				6:34.34	21
Alexej Baumgärtner	10000 m	—N/a				13:44.39	13
Patrick Beckert	1500 m	—N/a				1:48.08	23
Patrick Beckert	5000 m	—N/a				6:21.18	8
Patrick Beckert	10000 m	—N/a				13:14.26	6
Moritz Geisreiter	5000 m	—N/a				6:24.79	10
Moritz Geisreiter	10000 m	—N/a				13:20.26	8
Nico Ihle	500 m	34.99	7	35.11	9	70.1	8
Nico Ihle	1000 m	—N/a				1:08.86	4
Robert Lehmann	1500 m	—N/a				1:48.24	27
Samuel Schwarz	500 m	35.69	34	35.68	34	71.37	34
Samuel Schwarz	1000 m	—N/a				1:08.89	5

Women

Athlete	Event	Race 1		Race 2		Final	
Athlete	Event	Time	Rank	Time	Rank	Time	Rank
Monique Angermüller	1000 m	—N/a				DSQ	
Monique Angermüller	1500 m	—N/a				2:00.32	24
Stephanie Beckert	3000 m	—N/a				4:13.54	17
Stephanie Beckert	5000 m	—N/a				7:07.79	8
Judith Hesse	500 m	DSQ					
Judith Hesse	1000 m	—N/a				1:15.84	11
Gabriele Hirschbichler	500 m	39.82	34	39.69	34	79.51	34
Gabriele Hirschbichler	1000 m	—N/a				1:18.00	26
Gabriele Hirschbichler	1500 m	—N/a				2:01.18	30
Bente Kraus	3000 m	—N/a				4:10.16	11
Bente Kraus	5000 m	—N/a				7:10.66	11
Claudia Pechstein	1500 m	—N/a				1:59.47	19
Claudia Pechstein	3000 m	—N/a				4:05.26	4
Claudia Pechstein	5000 m	—N/a				6:58.39	5
Denise Roth	500 m	39.08	23	38.69	15	77.78	21
Jenny Wolf	500 m	37.93	8	37.73	5	75.67	6
Jenny Wolf	1000 m	—N/a				1:17.99	25
