= Luge at the 2014 Winter Olympics – Qualification =

The following is about the qualification rules and the quota allocation for the luge at the 2014 Winter Olympics.

== Qualification rules ==
A total of 110 quota spots are available to athletes to compete at the games. A maximum 38 men, 28 women, and 18 doubles teams will initially qualify. The qualification is based on the cumulative world ranking points from November 1, 2013 until of December 31st, 2013. 8 athletes will be added after this point, first to fill qualified relay teams who did not qualify individuals in all three disciplines, then from nations that meet minimum standards who were not already qualified. The host has the right to enter a competitor in the men's, doubles, and women's competitions provided they meet minimum standards.

== Quota allocation ==
Current allocation is according to the world rankings after the applicable five races. Two allocations will additionally be given in each of the three races with priority given to nations who need them to compete in the relay, followed by nations who are not yet qualified.

=== Current summary ===
Nations	Men's	Doubles	Women's	Relay	Athletes
Australia	1				1
Austria	3	2	3	X	10
Bulgaria	1				1
Canada	3	1	3	X	8
Czech Republic	1	1	1	X	4
France			1		1
Germany	3	2	3	X	10
Independent Olympic Participants	1				1
Italy	3	2	3	X	10
Japan	1				1
Kazakhstan			1		1
Latvia	3	2	2	X	9
Moldova	1				1
Norway	3				3
Poland	1	1	2	X	5
Romania	1	1	1	X	4
Russia	3	2	3	X	10
Slovakia	1	2	1	X	6
South Korea	1	1	1	X	4
Switzerland	1		1		2
Chinese Taipei	1				1
Tonga	1				1
Ukraine	2	1	2	X	6
United States	3	2	3	X	10
Total: 24 NOCs	39	20	31	13	110

=== Men's ===
The top 38, with each nation allowed a maximum of 3, after five of five races. The two additional quotas are also listed.

Number of sleds	Athletes total	Nation
3	24	Germany; Austria; Italy; United States; Latvia; Canada; Russia; Norway
2	2	~~Slovenia~~; Ukraine
1	12	Switzerland; Slovakia; Czech Republic; ~~Great Britain~~; Poland; Romania; Japan; Tonga; Australia; Moldova; India; South Korea; Bulgaria; ~~Netherlands~~; Chinese Taipei
40	~~40~~ 39	

- India and South Korea (the next two unrepresented nations) get the additional quota spots, as no nations were able to use them to complete a relay.
  - Slovenia and Great Britain rejected their quota spots. The next three nations in the rankings (Bulgaria, Netherlands and Chinese Taipei) received the quotas. Netherlands rejected their quota, and as the last country with an athlete in qualification, this meant only 39 athletes would compete.

=== Doubles ===
The top 18, with each nation allowed a maximum of 2, after five of five races. The two additional quotas are also listed.

Number of sleds	Athletes total	Nation
2	28	Germany; Austria; Italy; Latvia; United States; Russia; Slovakia
1	12	Canada; Czech Republic; Poland; Ukraine; Romania; South Korea
20	40	

- Romania and South Korea receive the team relay allocations to complete a team.

=== Women's ===
The top 28, with each nation allowed a maximum of 3, after five of five races. The additional quotas are also listed

Number of sleds	Athletes total	Nation
3	18	Germany; United States; Russia; Austria; Canada; Italy
2	6	Latvia; Poland; Ukraine
1	4	Switzerland; Romania; Slovakia; France; Czech Republic; South Korea; Kazakhstan
31	31	

- Czech Republic and South Korea receive the team relay allocations to complete a team. Since the men's singles competition did not use its last quota, a spot also goes to Kazakhstan (the next best ranked nation without representation).

=== Team Relay ===
The team relay world ranking.

Criteria	Teams	Nation
Qualified sleds in all events	10	Germany; United States; Italy; Austria; Canada; Latvia; Poland; Slovakia; Russia; Ukraine
Team relay quotas	2	Czech Republic; South Korea
	12	
