= 2014 Winter Olympics Parade of Nations =

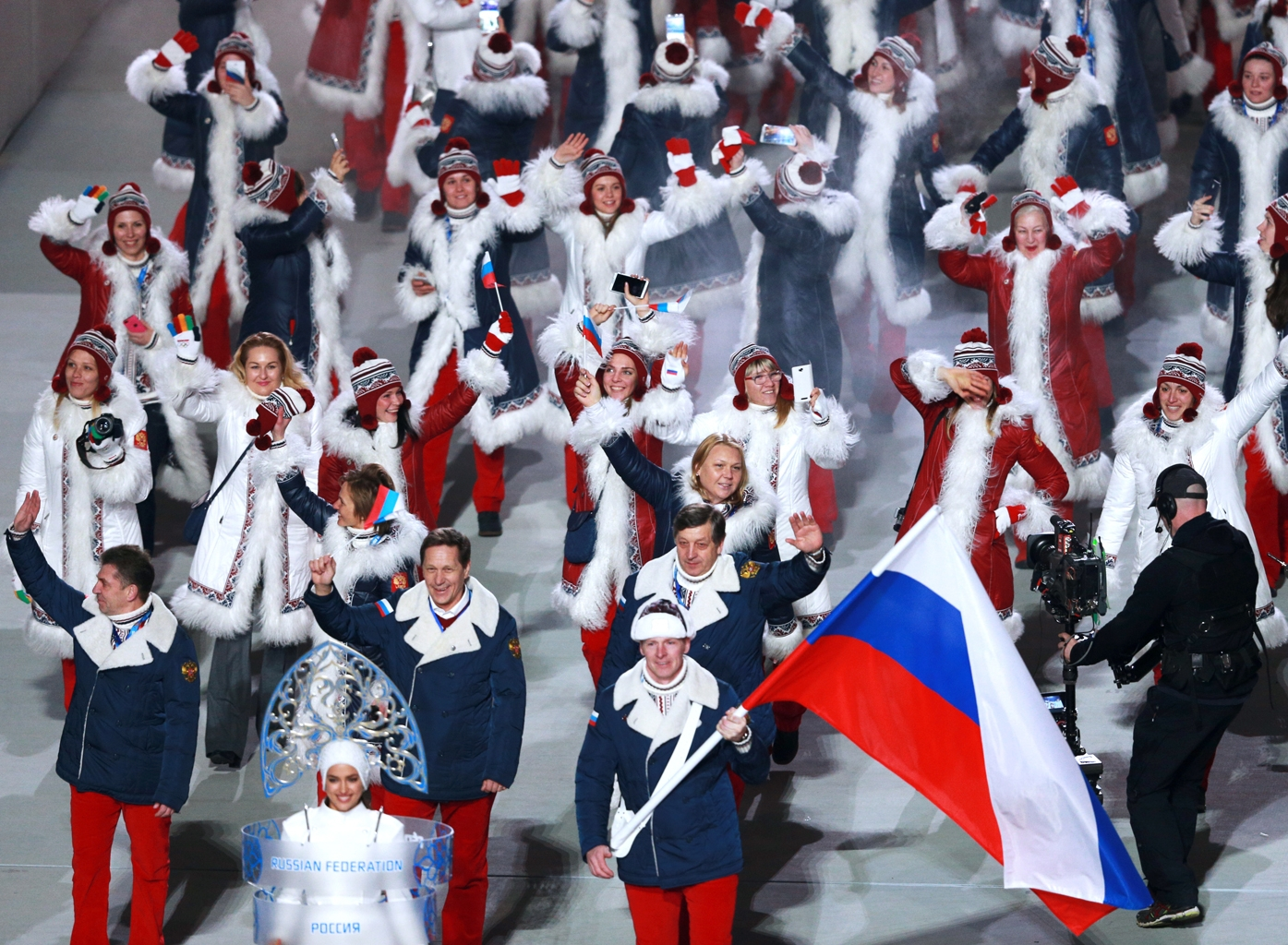
2014 Winter Olympics opening ceremony (2014-02-07)

2014 Winter Olympics Parade of Nations was part of the opening ceremony at the 2014 Winter Olympics. The national team from each nation participating in the Olympic Games was preceded by their national flag flag bearer into Fisht Olympic Stadium in the host city of Sochi, Russia. The flag bearer was an athlete of each national delegation chosen, to represent the athletes, either by the National Olympic Committee or by the national team.

The order of the parade was by Olympic tradition with Greece, originator of the modern games, entering first. The host nation, Russia, entered last. The nations entered in Russian alphabetic order. As each national team entered their name was announced by IOC guidelines in the official languages and customs: French, then English and Russian.

== List ==
Below is a list of parading countries and their announced flag bearer, in the same order as the parade. This is sortable by country name, flag bearer's name, or flag bearer's sport. Names are given in the form officially designated by the IOC.

Order	Nation	Russian	Romanisation	Flag bearer	Sport
1	Greece	Греция	Gretsiya	Panagiota Tsakiri	Cross-country skiing
2	Australia	Австралия	Avstraliya	Alex Pullin	Snowboarding
3	Austria	Австрия	Avstriya	Mario Stecher	Nordic combined
4	Azerbaijan	Азербайджан	Azerbaydzhan	Rahman Khalilov	Official
5	Albania	Албания	Albaniya	Erjon Tola	Alpine skiing
6	Andorra	Андорра	Andorra	Mireia Gutierrez	Alpine skiing
7	Argentina	Аргентина	Argentina	Cristian Simari Birkner	Alpine skiing
8	Armenia	Армения	Armeniya	Sergey Mikayelyan	Cross-country skiing
9	British Virgin Islands	Британские Виргинские острова	Britanskiye Virginiskiye Ostrova	Peter Crook	Freestyle skiing
10	Belarus	Республика Беларусь	Respublika Belarus'	Aleksei Grishin	Freestyle skiing
11	Belgium	Бельгия	Bel'giya	Hanna Mariën	Bobsleigh
12	Bermuda	Бермуды (Displayed); Бермудские Острова (Announced)	Bermudy; Bermudskiye Ostrova	Tucker Murphy	Cross-country skiing
13	Bulgaria	Болгария	Bolgariya	Maria Kirkova	Alpine skiing
14	Bosnia and Herzegovina	Босния и Герцеговина	Bosniya i Gertsegovina	Žana Novaković	Alpine skiing
15	Brazil	Бразилия	Braziliya	Jaqueline Mourão	Biathlon; Cross-country skiing
16	Macedonia	Бывшая югославская Республика Македония	Byvshaya Yugoslavskaya Respublika Makedoniya	Darko Damjanovski	Cross-country skiing
17	Great Britain	Великобритания	Velikobritaniya	Jon Eley	Short track speed skating
18	Hungary	Венгрия	Vengriya	Bernadett Heidum	Short track speed skating
19	Venezuela	Венесуэла	Venesuela	Antonio Jose Pardo Andretta	Alpine skiing
20	Virgin Islands	Виргинские острова, США	Virginiskiye Ostrova, SShA	Jasmine Campbell	Alpine skiing
21	Germany	Германия	Germaniya	Maria Höfl-Riesch	Alpine skiing
22	Hong Kong	Гонконг, Китай	Gonkong, Kitay	Pan-To Barton Lui	Short track speed skating
23	Georgia	Грузия	Gruziya	Nino Tsiklauri	Alpine skiing
24	Denmark	Дания	Daniya	Lene Nielsen	Curling
25	Dominica	Доминика	Dominika	Gary di Silvestri	Cross-country skiing
26	Zimbabwe	Зимбабве	Zimbabve	Luke Steyn	Alpine skiing
27	Israel	Израиль	Izrail'	Vladislav Bykanov	Short track speed skating
28	Iran	Иран	Iran	Hossein Saveh-Shemshaki	Alpine skiing
29	Ireland	Ирландия	Irlandiya	Conor Lyne	Alpine skiing
30	Iceland	Исландия	Islandiya	Sævar Birgisson	Cross-country skiing
31	Spain	Испания	Ispaniya	Javier Fernández	Figure skating
32	Italy	Италия	Italiya	Armin Zöggeler	Luge
33	Kazakhstan	Казахстан	Kazakhstan	Yerdos Akhmadiyev	Cross-country skiing
34	Cayman Islands	Каймановы острова	Kaymanovy Ostrova	Dow Travers	Alpine skiing
35	Canada	Канада	Kanada	Hayley Wickenheiser	Hockey
36	Cyprus	Кипр	Kipr	Constantinos Papamichael	Alpine skiing
37	Kyrgyzstan	Кыргызстан	Kyrgyzstan	Dmitry Trelevski	Alpine skiing
38	China	Китайская Народная Республика	Kitayskaya Narodnaya Respublika	Tong Jian	Figure skating
39	Latvia	Латвия	Latviya	Sandis Ozoliņš	Hockey
40	Lebanon	Ливан	Livan	Alexandre Mohbat	Alpine skiing
41	Lithuania	Литва	Litva	Deividas Stagniūnas	Figure skating
42	Liechtenstein	Лихтенштейн	Likhtenshteyn	Tina Weirather	Alpine skiing
43	Luxembourg	Люксембург	Lyuksemburg	Kari Peters	Cross-country skiing
44	Malta	Мальта	Mal'ta	Elise Pellegrin	Alpine skiing
45	Morocco	Марокко	Marokko	Adam Lamhamedi	Alpine skiing
46	Mexico	Мексика	Meksika	Hubertus Von Hohenlohe	Alpine skiing
47	Moldova	Молдова	Moldova	Victor Pinzaru	Cross-country skiing
48	Monaco	Монако	Monako	Olivier Jenot	Alpine skiing
49	Mongolia	Монголия	Mongoliya	Bold Byambadorj	Cross-country skiing
50	Independent Olympic Participants	Независимые олимпийские участники	Nezavisimye olimpiyskiye uchastniki	Volunteer from SOCOG	–
51	Nepal	Непал	Nepal	Dachhiri Sherpa	Cross-country skiing
52	Netherlands	Нидерланды	Niderlandy	Jorien ter Mors	Short track speed skating Speed skating
53	New Zealand	Новая Зеландия	Novaya Zelandiya	Shane Dobbin	Speed skating
54	Norway	Норвегия	Norvegiya	Aksel Lund Svindal	Alpine skiing
55	Pakistan	Пакистан	Pakistan	Muhammad Karim	Alpine skiing
56	Paraguay	Парагвай	Paragvay	Julia Marino	Freestyle skiing
57	Peru	Перу	Peru	Roberto Carcelen	Cross-country skiing
58	Poland	Польша	Pol'sha	Dawid Kupczyk	Bobsleigh
59	Portugal	Португалия	Portugaliya	Arthur Hanse	Alpine skiing
60	South Korea	Республика Корея	Respublika Koreya	Lee Kyou-Hyuk	Speed skating
61	Romania	Румыния	Rumyniya	Éva Tófalvi	Biathlon
62	San Marino	Сан-Марино	San-Marino	Vincenzo Michelotti	Alpine skiing
63	Serbia	Сербия	Serbiya	Milanko Petrović	Biathlon; Cross-country skiing
64	Slovakia	Словакия	Slovakiya	Zdeno Chára	Hockey
65	Slovenia	Словения	Sloveniya	Tomaž Razingar	Hockey
66	United States	Соединенные Штаты Америки	Soyedinennyye Shtaty Ameriki	Todd Lodwick	Nordic combined
67	Tajikistan	Таджикистан	Tadzhikistan	Alisher Kudratov	Alpine skiing
68	Thailand	Таиланд	Thailand	Kanes Sucharitakul	Alpine skiing
69	Chinese Taipei	Китайский Тайбэй	Kitayskiy Taybey	Sung Ching-yang	Speed skating
70	Timor-Leste	Восточный Тимор	Vostochnyy Timor	Yohan Goutt Gonçalves	Alpine skiing
71	Togo	Того	Togo	Mathilde-Amivi Petitjean	Cross-country skiing
72	Tonga	Тонга	Tonga	Bruno Banani	Luge
73	Turkey	Турция	Turtsiya	Alper Uçar	Figure skating
74	Uzbekistan	Узбекистан	Uzbekistan	Kseniya Grigoreva	Alpine skiing
75	Ukraine	Украина	Ukraina	Valentina Shevchenko	Cross-country skiing
76	Philippines	Филиппины	Filippiny	Michael Christian Martinez	Figure skating
77	Finland	Финляндия	Finlyandiya	Enni Rukajärvi	Snowboarding
78	France	Франция	Frantsiya	Jason Lamy-Chappuis	Nordic combined
79	Croatia	Хорватия	Khorvatiya	Ivica Kostelić	Alpine skiing
80	Montenegro	Черногория	Chernogoriya	Tarik Hadžić	Alpine skiing
81	Czech Republic	Чехия	Chekhiya	Šárka Strachová	Alpine skiing
82	Chile	Чили	Chili	Dominique Ohaco	Freestyle skiing
83	Switzerland	Швейцария	Shveytsariya	Simon Ammann	Ski jumping
84	Sweden	Швеция	Shvetsiya	Anders Södergren	Cross-country skiing
85	Estonia	Эстония	Estoniya	Indrek Tobreluts	Biathlon
86	Jamaica	Ямайка	Yamayka	Marvin Dixon	Bobsleigh
87	Japan	Япония	Yaponiya	Ayumi Ogasawara	Curling
88	Russia	Россия (Displayed); Российская Федерация (Announced)	Rossiya; Rossiyskaya Federatsiya	Alexandr Zubkov	Bobsleigh

== See also ==
- 2014 Winter Paralympics Parade of Nations
