= 2014 Winter Olympics closing ceremony flag bearers =

During the closing ceremony in Sochi, Russia most of the 88 nations competing selected one member of their delegation to be the flagbearer. Some countries for example, Morocco chose the same athlete (Adam Lamhamedi) as the opening ceremony. On the other hand, some countries such as Luxembourg had already left the Olympic village, and therefore a volunteer carried the flags for those countries.

== Countries and flagbearers ==
Below is a list of all parading countries with their announced flag bearer, sorted in the order in which they appeared in the parade. This is sortable by country name under which they entered, the flag bearer's name, or the flag bearer's sport. Names are given as were officially designated by the International Olympic Committee (IOC).

| Order | Nation | Russian | Romanisation | Flag bearer | Sport |
|---|---|---|---|---|---|
| 1 | Greece | Греция | Gretsiya | Alexandros Kefalas | Skeleton |
| 2 | Australia | Австралия | Avstraliya | David Morris | Freestyle skiing |
| 3 | Austria | Австрия | Avstriya | Julia Dujmovits | Snowboarding |
| 4 | Azerbaijan | Азербайджан | Azerbaidzhan | Alexei Sitnikov | Figure skating |
| 5 | Albania | Албания | Albaniya | Suela Mëhilli | Alpine skiing |
| 6 | Andorra | Андорра | Andorra | Laure Soulie | Biathlon |
| 7 | Argentina | Аргентина | Argentina | Sebastiano Gastaldi | Alpine skiing |
| 8 | Armenia | Армения | Armeniya | Arman Serebrakian | Alpine skiing |
| 9 | British Virgin Islands | Британские Виргинские острова | Britanskiye Virginiskiye Ostrova | Peter Crook | Freestyle skiing |
| 10 | Belarus | Беларусь | Belarus' | Darya Domracheva | Biathlon |
| 11 | Belgium | Бельгия | Bel'giya | Bart Swings | Speed skating |
| 12 | Bermuda | Бермуды | Bermudy | Volunteer | – |
| 13 | Bulgaria | Болгария | Bolgariya | Nikola Chongarov | Alpine skiing |
| 14 | Bosnia and Herzegovina | Босния и Герцеговина | Bosniya i Gertsegovina | Žana Novaković | Alpine skiing |
| 15 | Brazil | Бразилия | Braziliya | Isadora Williams | Figure skating |
| 16 | Macedonia | Бывшая югославская Республика Македония | Byvshaya Yugoslavskaya Respublika Makedoniya | Volunteer | – |
| 17 | Great Britain | Великобритания | Velikobritaniya | Lizzy Yarnold | Skeleton |
| 18 | Hungary | Венгрия | Vengriya | Szandra Lajtos | Short track speed skating |
| 19 | Venezuela | Венесуэла | Venesuela | Antonio Jose Pardo Andretta | Alpine skiing |
| 20 | Virgin Islands | Виргинские острова,США | Virginiskiye Ostrova, SShA | Jasmine Campbell | Alpine skiing |
| 21 | Germany | Германия | Germaniya | Felix Loch | Luge |
| 22 | Hong Kong | Гонконг, Китай | Gonkong, Kitai | Volunteer | – |
| 23 | Georgia | Грузия | Gruziya | Elene Gedevanishvili | Figure skating |
| 24 | Denmark | Дания | Daniya | Martin Møller | Cross-country skiing |
| 25 | Dominica | Доминика | Dominika | Gary di Silvestri | Cross-country skiing |
| 26 | Zimbabwe | Зимбабве | Zimbabve | Luke Steyn | Alpine skiing |
| 27 | Israel | Израиль | Izrail' | Vladislav Bykanov | Short track speed skating |
| 28 | India | Индия | Indiya | Himanshu Thakur | Alpine skiing |
| 29 | Iran | Иран | Iran | Mohammad Kiyadarbandsari | Alpine skiing |
| 30 | Ireland | Ирландия | Irlandiya | Seamus O'Connor | Snowboarding |
| 31 | Iceland | Исландия | Islandiya | Helga María Vilhjálmsdóttir | Alpine skiing |
| 32 | Spain | Испания | Ispaniya | Laura Orgué | Cross-country skiing |
| 33 | Italy | Италия | Italiya | Arianna Fontana | Short track speed skating |
| 34 | Kazakhstan | Казахстан | Kazakhstan | Yerdos Akhmadiyev | Cross-country skiing |
| 35 | Cayman Islands | Каймановы острова | Kaimanovy Ostrova | Dow Travers | Alpine skiing |
| 36 | Canada | Канада | Kanada | Kaillie Humphries; Heather Moyse | Bobsleigh |
| 37 | Cyprus | Кипр | Kipr | Alexandra Taylor | Alpine skiing |
| 38 | Kyrgyzstan | Кыргызстан | Kyrgyzstan | Evgeniy Timofeev | Alpine skiing |
| 39 | China | Китайская Народная Республика | Kitaiskaya Narodnaya Respublika | Liu Qiuhong | Short track speed skating |
| 40 | Latvia | Латвия | Latviya | Daumants Dreiškens | Bobsleigh |
| 41 | Lebanon | Ливан | Livan | Jackie Chamoun | Alpine skiing |
| 42 | Lithuania | Литва | Litva | Agnė Sereikaitė | Short track speed skating |
| 43 | Liechtenstein | Лихтенштейн | Likhtenshtein | Volunteer | – |
| 44 | Luxembourg | Люксембург | Lyuksemburg | Volunteer | – |
| 45 | Malta | Мальта | Mal'ta | Elise Pellegrin | Alpine skiing |
| 46 | Morocco | Марокко | Marokko | Adam Lamhamedi | Alpine skiing |
| 47 | Mexico | Мексика | Meksika | Hubertus Von Hohenlohe | Alpine skiing |
| 48 | Moldova | Молдова | Moldova | Victor Pinzaru | Cross-country skiing |
| 49 | Monaco | Монако | Monako | Rudy Rinaldi* | Bobsleigh |
| 50 | Mongolia | Монголия | Mongoliya | Otgontsetseg Chinbat | Cross-country skiing |
| 51 | Nepal | Непал | Nepal | Dachhiri Sherpa | Cross-country skiing |
| 52 | Netherlands | Нидерланды | Niderlandy | Bob de Jong | Speed skating |
| 53 | New Zealand | Новая Зеландия | Novaya Zelandiya | Jossi Wells | Freestyle skiing |
| 54 | Norway | Норвегия | Norvegiya | Ole Einar Bjørndalen | Biathlon |
| 55 | Pakistan | Пакистан | Pakistan | Muhammad Karim | Alpine skiing |
| 56 | Paraguay | Парагвай | Paragvai | Volunteer | – |
| 57 | Peru | Перу | Peru | Roberto Carcelen | Cross-country skiing |
| 58 | Poland | Польша | Pol'sha | Zbigniew Bródka | Speed skating |
| 59 | Portugal | Португалия | Portugaliya | Camille Dias | Alpine skiing |
| 60 | South Korea | Республика Корея | Respublika Koreya | Lee Kyou-Hyuk | Speed skating |
| 61 | Romania | Румыния | Rumyniya | Éva Tófalvi | Biathlon |
| 62 | San Marino | Сан-Марино | San-Marino | Federica Selva | Alpine skiing |
| 63 | Serbia | Сербия | Serbiya | Nevena Ignjatović | Alpine skiing |
| 64 | Slovakia | Словакия | Slovakiya | Anastasiya Kuzmina | Biathlon |
| 65 | Slovenia | Словения | Sloveniya | Zan Kosir | Snowboarding |
| 66 | United States | Соединенные Штаты Америки | Soyedinennye Shtaty Ameriki | Julie Chu | Hockey |
| 67 | Tajikistan | Таджикистан | Tadzhikistan | Alisher Kudratov | Alpine skiing |
| 68 | Thailand | Таиланд | Thailand | Kanes Sucharitakul | Alpine skiing |
| 69 | Chinese Taipei | Китайский Тайбэй | Kitaiskii Taibei | Mackenzie Blackburn | Short track seed skating |
| 70 | Timor-Leste | Тимор-Лесте | Timor-Leste | Yohan Goutt Gonçalves | Alpine skiing |
| 71 | Togo | Того | Togo | Alessia Afi Dipol | Alpine skiing |
| 72 | Tonga | Тонга | Tonga | Bruno Banani | Luge |
| 73 | Turkey | Турция | Turtsiya | Tuğba Kocaağa | Alpine skiing |
| 74 | Uzbekistan | Узбекистан | Uzbekistan | Kseniya Grigoreva | Alpine skiing |
| 75 | Ukraine | Украина | Ukraina | Vita Semerenko | Biathlon |
| 76 | Philippines | Филиппины | Filippiny | Volunteer | – |
| 77 | Finland | Финляндия | Finlyandiya | Iivo Niskanen | Cross-country skiing |
| 78 | France | Франция | Frantsiya | Martin Fourcade | Biathlon |
| 79 | Croatia | Хорватия | Horvatiya | Vedrana Malec | Cross-country skiing |
| 80 | Montenegro | Черногория | Chernogoriya | Volunteer | – |
| 81 | Czech Republic | Чехия | Chekhiya | Ondřej Moravec | Biathlon |
| 82 | Chile | Чили | Chili | Yonathan Fernandez | Cross-country skiing |
| 83 | Switzerland | Швейцария | Shveitsariya | Patrizia Kummer | Snowboarding |
| 84 | Sweden | Швеция | Shvetsiya | Charlotte Kalla | Cross-country skiing |
| 85 | Estonia | Эстония | Estoniya | Karel Tammjärv | Cross-country skiing |
| 86 | Jamaica | Ямайка | Yamaika | Volunteer | – |
| 87 | Japan | Япония | Yaponiya | Ayumi Ogasawara | Curling |
| 88 | Russia | Россия | Rossiya | Maxim Trankov | Figure skating |

*Rudy Rinaldi of Monaco was the reserve athlete (and thus did not compete) in the 2-man bobsledding event.
