= Zimbabwe at the 2014 Winter Olympics =

- IOC code: ZIM
- NOC: Zimbabwe Olympic Committee

in Sochi, Russia 7–23 February 2014
- Competitors: 1 in 1 sport
- Flag bearer (opening): Luke Steyn
- Flag bearer (closing): Luke Steyn
- Medals: Gold 0 Silver 0 Bronze 0 Total 0

Winter Olympics appearances (overview)
- 2014; 2018–2026

The Southeast African country of Zimbabwe competed at the 2014 Winter Olympics held in Sochi, Russia, from 7 to 23 February 2014. It was the nation's first appearance at the Winter Olympics. The Zimbabwean delegation consisted of one athlete competing in alpine skiing, Luke Steyn. Steyn was the flagbearer for both the opening and closing ceremonies. He was unsuccessful in securing a medal in his Olympic debut.

== Background ==
Zimbabwe made its Summer Olympic debut at the 1980 Games in Moscow, Soviet Union, after gaining independence earlier that year. Its colonial predecessor Southern Rhodesia (competing as Rhodesia) had previously debuted at the Games in 1928.

Zimbabwe had never sent a delegation to the Winter Olympics prior to 2014. It does not snow in Zimbabwe, a subtropical country where winter temperatures reach up to 21 °C (70 °F). Accordingly, while Luke Steyn was born in the Zimbabwean capital Harare, he moved to Switzerland when he was two years old and was raised in Europe. Commenting on his heritage, Steyn said in an interview before the Games:

Once it is in your blood, it is in your blood. I feel still very connected to Zimbabwe and Africa as a whole. I spend as many holidays as I can there. When I am not training or in university, I am in Zimbabwe or in other parts of Africa. The beauty of Africa always makes you want to go back there.

Steyn qualified for the Games through the Olympic quota allocation system. He was Zimbabwe's flag bearer during the opening and closing ceremonies.

== Alpine skiing ==
Steyn was 20 years old at the time of his Olympic debut in Sochi, Russia. He trained in Colorado, United States, where he was attending university. He competed in the men's giant slalom race held on 19 February. In the first run, he placed 61st with a time of 1 minute and 32.2 seconds. In his second, he placed 59th with a time of 1 minute and 34.35 seconds. He ultimately finished 57th out of 72 athletes who completed the event, with a total time of 3 minutes and 6.55 seconds. He did not finish the first run of the men's slalom race, held on 22 February.

Athlete	Event	Run 1		Run 2		Total	
Athlete	Event	Time	Rank	Time	Rank	Time	Rank
Luke Steyn	Men's giant slalom	1:32.20	61	1:34.35	59	3:06.55	57
Luke Steyn	Men's slalom	DNF					

== See also ==
- Tropical nations at the Winter Olympics
