= Bruno Banani (luger) =

Tongan luger (born 1987)

Personal information
- Nationality: Tongan
- Born: Fuahea Semi; December 4, 1987 (age 38)

Sport
- Country: Tonga
- Sport: Luge
Medal record
Luge
Representing Tonga
American-Pacific Championships
Bronze medal – third place	2012 Calgary	Men's singles

Bruno Banani (born Fuahea Semi; 4 December 1987) is a Tongan luger who adopted his current name as part of a marketing ploy.

== Biography ==
A 21-year-old computer science student, he was selected by his country to attempt to qualify for the luge events at the 2010 Winter Olympics, as the first ever Tongan to participate in the Winter Olympic Games. Along with Taniela Tufunga, a young recruit in the Tonga Defence Service who was his training partner and potential replacement, he travelled to Germany for training. He ultimately failed to qualify for the Games. He did, however, qualify to take part in the FIL World Luge Championships 2011 (which took place in January), where he finished 36th (last but one), eliminated after the first run with a time of 56.698.

In the meantime, he had been sponsored by a marketing firm, Makai, which presented him to the public under the name "Bruno Banani" – the name of a German underwear firm. He entered into an "endorsement deal" with the latter, "promoting [its] new line dubbed Coconut Power", which the company said "was inspired by him, attributing his sporting prowess to the quality of the coconuts he consumes". To enhance his appeal, he was presented as the son of a coconut farmer, although his father in reality was a cassava farmer. Makai reportedly obtained a passport for Semi under this new name, and he was universally referred to in the media, as well as by the International Luge Federation and the Chinese Olympic Committee, as "Banani". German media were reportedly "fascinated" by this Tongan luger bearing such a coincidental name; ZDF reportedly "suggested that the touching, exotic story of the luger from the South Sea bore similarities to that of the Jamaican bobsled team" at the 1988 Winter Olympics. Before this transformation, some media had referred to Semi by his true name, including the Samoa Observer and Radio Australia, based on an article in Matangi Tonga. In December 2011, the Vancouver Sun referred to him as Banani, adding that when he had first arrived in Germany he had been "going by his given name Fuahea Semi":

"[H]e apparently changed his name, although he denies it. During a chance encounter in Whistler Village on Thursday, he insisted Bruno Banani is on his passport and birth certificate, neither of which he had with him. However, Matangi Tongo [sic] online clearly ran a photo of him as Fuahea Semi when he was recruited back in December 2008."

That same month, in December 2011, Semi (under the name Banani) won a bronze medal at the American-Pacific Championships in Calgary. He also qualified for the FIL World Luge Championships 2012, by finishing eighteenth in the qualifiers. The World Championships took place in February; Semi (under the name Banani) finished 34th out of 37, with a time of 56.326 in his single run. Simultaneously, he was continuing to train with the German luge team, including three time Olympic gold medallist Georg Hackl and Olympic silver medallist David Möller, with an aim to qualify for the 2014 Winter Olympics.

The Vancouver Sun article on his name change had apparently gone unnoticed, but the following month, in January 2012, the German magazine Der Spiegel uncovered anew and reported on the name change which had taken place as a marketing ploy. This time, the revelation was echoed in other media articles (some of which contained errors themselves, such as The Daily Telegraph referring to Semi's home country as the "island of Tonga"). Mid-February, shortly before the beginning of the World Luge Championships, Semi continued to be sponsored by his "namesake" company, which had devoted a webpage to him.

International Olympic Committee Vice President Thomas Bach responded by saying the name change was "in bad taste", a "perverse marketing idea". He confirmed, however, that if Semi qualified for the 2014 Olympics and if his passport did indeed bear the name "Bruno Banani", the IOC would be unable to prevent him from competing under that name. Subsequently, Semi had his name legally changed to "Bruno Banani".

In December 2013, Semi qualified for the luge event at the 2014 Winter Olympics, becoming the first ever Tongan scheduled to compete in Winter Olympic Games. He competed in the men's singles, under the name Banani, and finished thirty-second out of thirty-nine, with a combined time of 3:33.676, six seconds behind gold medal winner Felix Loch. His fastest run was in 53.162 seconds.

Athlete	Event	Run 1		Run 2		Run 3		Run 4		Total	
Athlete	Event	Time	Rank	Time	Rank	Time	Rank	Time	Rank	Time	Rank
Bruno Banani	Men's singles	53.656	34	53.637	31	53.162	30	53.221	33	3:33.676	32

In 2017, Banani was again attempting to qualify for the 2018 Winter Olympics, but he was unsuccessful.
