= Malta at the 2014 Winter Olympics =

- IOC code: MLT
- NOC: Malta Olympic Committee
- Website: www.nocmalta.org

in Sochi 7–23 February 2014
- Competitors: 1 in 1 sport
- Flag bearers: Élise Pellegrin (opening and closing)
- Medals: Gold 0 Silver 0 Bronze 0 Total 0

Winter Olympics appearances (overview)
- 2014; 2018; 2022; 2026

Malta sent a delegation to compete at the 2014 Winter Olympics in Sochi, Russia from 7 to 23 February 2014, with one competitor, alpine skier Élise Pellegrin. This was Malta's debut at the Winter Olympics. Pellegrin was designated as the flag bearer for both the parade of nations during the opening ceremony and the closing ceremony. She took part in the women's giant slalom and the women's slalom, and her best result was 42nd in the women's slalom.

== Background ==
Malta first sent a delegation to compete in the Summer Olympics in the 1928 Amsterdam Games. They have competed in most Summer Olympics since, missing the Olympics only in five occasions between 1932 and 1976. These were in 1932, 1952, 1956, 1964, and 1976. In spite of this, the 2014 Winter Olympics in Sochi, held from 7 to 23 February 2014, was their Winter Olympics debut. Élise Pellegrin was the only competitor sent to the Sochi games, and she would also be the only competitor in the designation sent to Pyeongchang in 2018. As the only athlete, Pellegrin was chosen as the flag bearer for both the parade of nations during the opening ceremony, and the closing ceremony. In Sochi, Malta was one of 18 countries who only had one representative in the Games.

== Competitors ==
Sport	Men	Women	Total
Alpine skiing	0	1	1
Total	0	1	1

== Alpine skiing ==
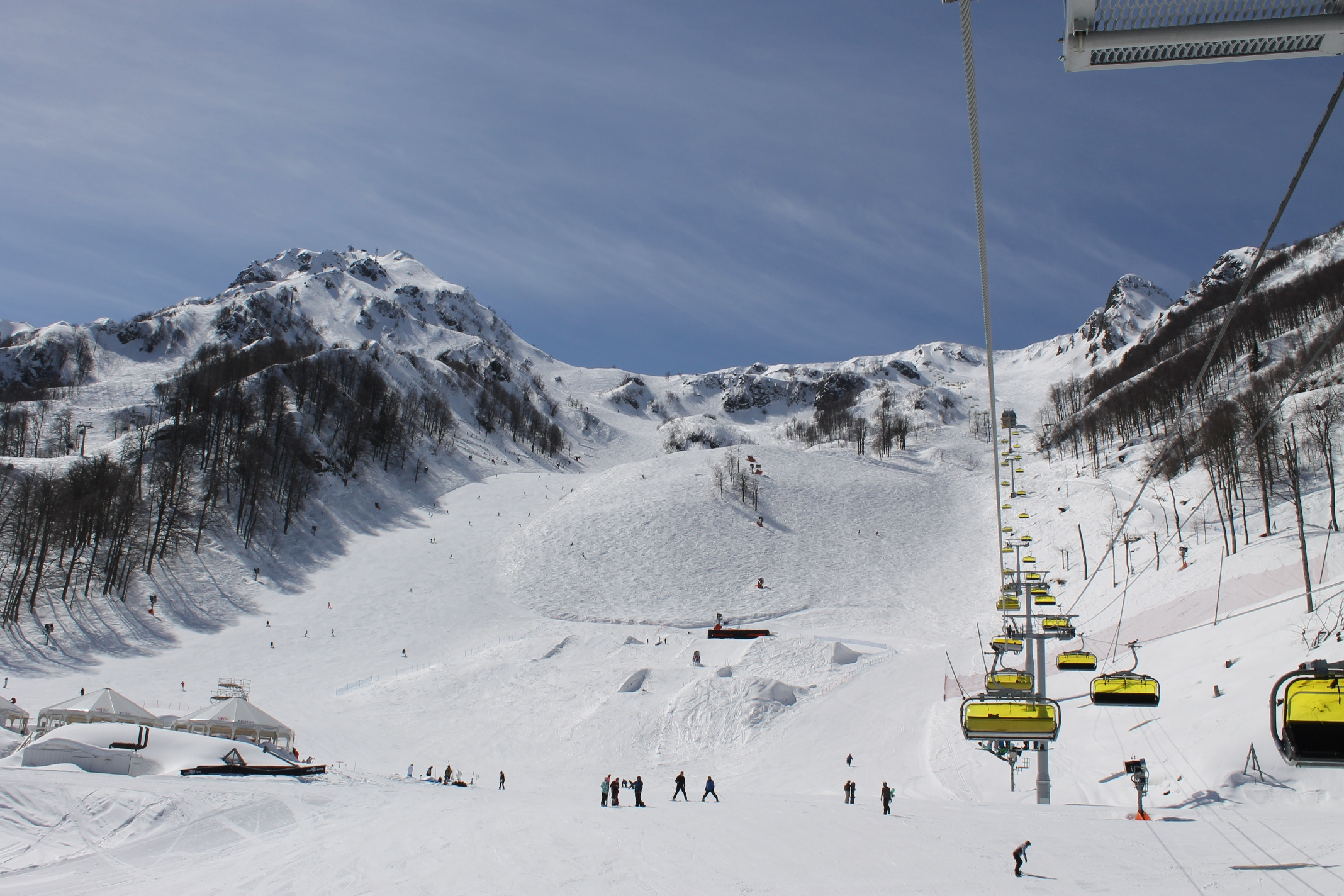
Rosa Khutor Alpine Resort, where the alpine skiing events were held.

According to the final quota allocation released on January 20, 2014 Malta had qualified one athlete. Born in France, Élise Pellegrin has Maltese citizenship because her great-grandfather was Malta-born, giving her the opportunity to compete for the country. Before the competition, Pellegrin said, "I'm really excited and proud to represent Malta – my roots are from there and it's very important to me". Her mother cried "tears of happiness" when Pellegrin announced she was going to represent Malta. On February 18, Pellegrin finished the giant slalom race in 65th position out of 67 skiers who completed both runs. On February 21, she finished the slalom race in 42nd position out of 49 skiers who completed both runs.

Athlete	Event	Run 1		Run 2		Total	
Athlete	Event	Time	Rank	Time	Rank	Time	Rank
Élise Pellegrin	Women's giant slalom	1:36.85	72	1:36.27	64	3:13.12	65
Élise Pellegrin	Women's slalom	1:07.10	52	1:02.73	39	2:09.83	42

== See also ==
- Malta at the 2014 Summer Youth Olympics
