= Sochi Light Metro =

Planned Public Transport System in Sochi, Russia

Overview
- Owner: Sochi City council
- Locale: Russia, Sochi
- Transit type: Light metro
- Number of lines: 3
- Number of stations: 24

Operation
- Operation will start: 2028
- Operator: Moscow Metro

Technical
- System length: 86.4 km (53.69 mi)
- Track gauge: 1,520 mm (4 ft 11 27/32 in) (Russian gauge)

Sochi Light Metro was a planned public transportation system in Sochi, Russia, with an intended completion date of 2013. The system was intended to be used during the 2014 Winter Olympics. The plans for the light metro were abandoned in favor of the reconstruction of the railway.

== History ==
According to a press release of Sochi Olympics, a light rail system was originally proposed which would span 36 km, but eventually a Russian-style light metro system was chosen instead. After Moscow's Butovskaya Line and Saint Petersburg's Nadzemny Express, the Sochi Light Metro would have been Russia's third light metro, among 11 Russian rail rapid transit systems altogether.

Due to a crisis, the project was changed from a light metro to a scaled-down commuter-style railway called the Sochi Aeroexpress. The line will connect the airport with Krasnaya Polyana with an intermediate stop in Adler. The abbreviated version will include a 2.8 km tunnel.

The estimated construction budget is $758,8 million. Original plans for the system were the building of three interconnected lines, with a total of 86.4 km of track and 24 stations running in a mixture of underground, mountain tunnels, elevated, and at-grade construction:

- Olympic Village — Grushevaya Polyana, 49.9 km, 6 stations; according to the ongoing construction, the airport Sochi is not connected to this line. The airport Sochi is connected only by a dead-end station to Adler railway station.
- Olympic Village — Mamayka, via Adler Station and Downtown Sochi (with possible extension to Dagomys and Uch-Dere westwards): 36.3 km, 20 stations;
- Mamayka — Grushevaya Polyana, via Adler Station and Sochi International Airport: 69.9 km, 17 stations.

In December 2008 RZD announced it would be tendering for 54 dual voltage (AC and DC), 160 km/h (99 mph) trains with capacities of about 1000 passengers for use in southern Russia, and for use during the Sochi Olympics. In February 2009 Bombardier Transportation was reported as the winner with its «Spacium» train design. In December 2009 the formal contract for 54 trains (valued $598 million) was signed with Siemens. Siemens designates the train type Desiro RUS, the trains have been named Ласточка (Lastochka, Swallow).

A news report of January 27, 2012 by Rail.co website (United Kingdom) stated that the rail link between Adler and the Sochi International Airport will be operational later that year.

As of December 31, 2013, the scaled-down version of the system, the Sochi Aeroexpress, is in operation, on a route between Sochi and the Sochi International Airport with a stop in Adler.
