= Tonga at the 2014 Winter Olympics =

- IOC code: TGA
- NOC: Tonga Sports Association and National Olympic Committee
- Website: www.oceaniasport.com/tonga

in Sochi
- Competitors: 1 in 1 sport
- Flag bearers: Bruno Banani (opening and closing)
- Medals: Gold 0 Silver 0 Bronze 0 Total 0

Winter Olympics appearances (overview)
- 2014; 2018; 2022; 2026

Tonga sent a delegation to compete at the 2014 Winter Olympics in Sochi, Russia from 7–23 February 2014. This was the Pacific island nation's debut at the Winter Olympic Games. The Tongan delegation consisted of one luge athlete, Bruno Banani, who had changed his name in a marketing gimmick to match that of German brand Bruno Banani. In his event, the men's singles, he came in 32nd place out of 39 competitors.

== Background ==
The Tonga Sports Association and National Olympic Committee was recognized by the International Olympic Committee on 1 January 1984. The Kingdom made its Olympic debut at the 1984 Summer Olympics, and has appeared at every Summer Olympic Games since then. These Sochi Olympics were the Kingdom's debut at the Winter Olympic Games. The 2014 Winter Olympics were held from 7–23 February 2014; a total of 2,780 athletes representing 88 National Olympic Committees took part. Bruno Banani, a luger, was the only athlete Tonga sent to Sochi. Banani was selected as the flag bearer for both the opening ceremony and closing ceremony.

== Luge ==
Tonga qualified for a place in the men's singles when Bruno Banani finished in the top 38 (with a maximum of three per nation qualifying) during an event in the 2013–14 Luge World Cup. He took up luge in 2009 having previously trained in rugby, and had failed to qualify for the 2010 Winter Olympics by being a single point short after crashing in the final qualifying race. Banani, whose birth name is Fuahea Semi, had attracted media attention by changing his name to that of a German lingerie company, as part of a marketing ploy. His name change was criticised by International Olympic Committee Vice President Thomas Bach, who described it as being "in bad taste".

Banani was 26 years old at the time of the Sochi Olympics. The men's singles competition was held on 8–9 February, with two runs being contested each day; the final mark of each athlete was the sum of all four of their runs. On the first day, Banani's run times were 53.656 seconds and 53.637 seconds. Overnight, he was in 33rd place out of 39 competitors, and three seconds behind the leader. On the second day, he posted run times of 53.162 seconds and 53.221 seconds for his fourth and final run. Banani finished 32nd out of 39 competitors, with a combined time of 3 minutes and 33.676 seconds. Felix Loch of Germany won the gold medal with a total time of 3 minutes and 27.526 seconds, the silver medal was taken by Albert Demchenko of Russia, and the bronze medal was earned by Armin Zöggeler of Italy.

Athlete	Event	Run 1		Run 2		Run 3		Run 4		Total	
Athlete	Event	Time	Rank	Time	Rank	Time	Rank	Time	Rank	Time	Rank
Bruno Banani	Men's singles	53.656	34	53.637	31	53.162	30	53.221	33	3:33.676	32

== See also ==
- Tropical nations at the Winter Olympics
- Tonga at the 2014 Commonwealth Games
- Tonga at the 2014 Summer Youth Olympics
