= Marvin Dixon =

Jamaican bobsledder

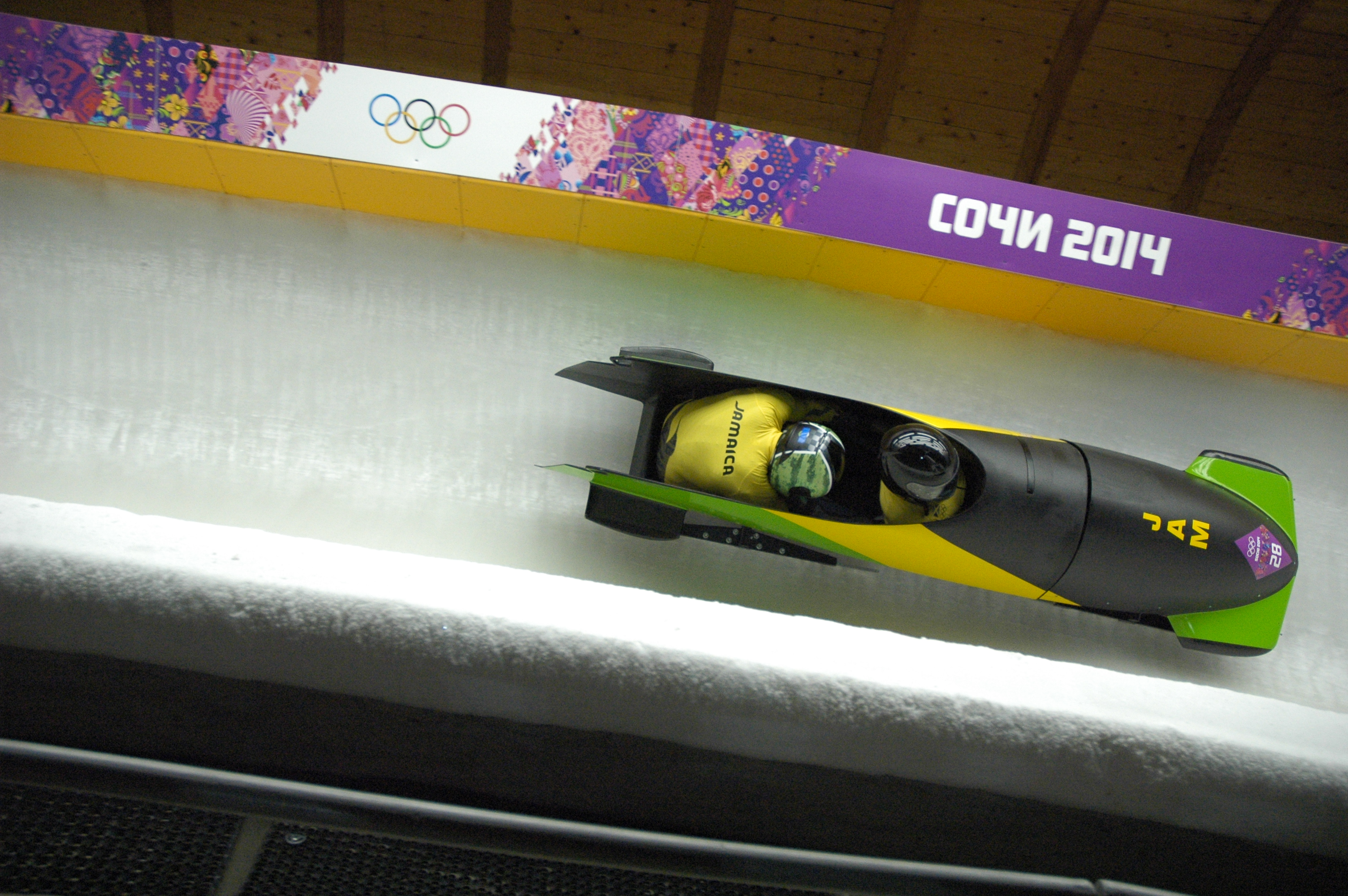
- Dixon at the 2014 Winter Olympics

Sport
- Country: Jamaica
- Sport: Bobsleigh

Marvin Dixon (born on September 9, 1983) is a member of the Jamaica national bobsleigh team and competed in the 2014 Winter Olympics in the two-man bobsled.

Dixon was born on August 9, 1983, in Rockfort, St. Andrews, Jamaica. He has been a Jamaica National team member since May 2007.

He was selected to carry the Jamaican flag at the 2014 Winter Olympics opening ceremony.

Before bobsleigh, Dixon was a track & field athlete in high school, where he ran 100m, 200m, and also 400m along with Damien Shalon Cox.

Olympic Games
| Preceded by Usain Bolt | Flagbearer for Jamaica; Sochi 2014 | Succeeded by Shelly-Ann Fraser-Pryce |
