= Bruno Banani =

German fashion company

- Type: GmbH
- Industry: Textile
- Genre: Fashion
- Founded: Chemnitz (1993)
- Founder: Wolfgang Jassner; Klaus Jungnickel; Jan Jassner
- Headquarters: Germany
- Products: Undergarments; Men's clothing Women's clothing
- Net income: €82.5 million (2009)
- Number of employees: 95
- Website: brunobanani.com

Bruno Banani is a German fashion company with headquarters in Chemnitz. On 11 March 2009, Bruno Banani launched a product range using the eco-friendly fiber Biophyl from Advansa with class 1 Oeko-tex standard rating.

The marketing rights for the perfumes with the brand name Bruno Banani are held by the COTY company.

Prior to the 2010 Winter Olympics, German media took an interest in a Tongan luger training in Germany, who was apparently also called Bruno Banani. In January 2012, it was revealed that his real name was Fuahea Semi, and that his renaming had been a marketing ploy. In 2013, Semi officially changed his name to Bruno Banani, and competed under that name.

== Bibliography ==
- Stuart Slatter, David Lovett, Corporate Recovery: Managing Companies in Distress, Beard Books, 1999. ISBN 1-58798-242-0.
- Karl-Heinz von Lackum, Mit Branding an die Spitze!: Wie sie auch ohne Werbemillionen die Konkurrenz, Gabler, April 2004. ISBN 3-409-12668-6.
