= Matangi Tonga =

Online Tongan newspaper

Matangi Tonga is an online newspaper providing Tongan news in both English and Tongan. It is operated by Vava'u Press. The newspaper's Nukuʻalofa office was destroyed in the fires and rioting in November 2006.
