= Luke Steyn =

Zimbabwean alpine skier (born 1993)

Personal information
- Full name: Luke Henri Steyn
- National team: Zimbabwe
- Born: 7 June 1993 (age 31); Harare, Zimbabwe

Sport
- Sport: Alpine skiing
- Event: Giant slalom

Luke Henri Steyn (born 7 June 1993) is a Zimbabwean alpine skier. Steyn competed for Zimbabwe at the 2014 Winter Olympics in Sochi, becoming the first Winter Olympian to represent the country. He finished in 57th place in the men's giant slalom event, and did not finish in the men's slalom event.

Steyn was born in Harare, but left at the age of two to Switzerland, where he eventually was exposed to snow and skiing. He is a dual citizen of Zimbabwe and the United Kingdom.

Steyn graduated from the University of Colorado in 2016 with a Bachelor of Business Administration and received a master's degree in real estate finance from the University of Cambridge in 2018. He is also a student ambassador at the London Business School. He has lived in Zimbabwe, Switzerland, Monaco, France, Italy, Austria, the United States, and South Africa.

== See also ==
- Zimbabwe at the 2014 Winter Olympics
