= Bulgaria at the 2014 Winter Olympics =

- IOC code: BUL
- NOC: Bulgarian Olympic Committee
- Website: www.bgolympic.org (in Bulgarian and English)

in Sochi
- Competitors: 18 in 6 sports
- Flag bearers: Maria Kirkova (opening); Nikola Chongarov (closing)
- Medals: Gold 0 Silver 0 Bronze 0 Total 0

Winter Olympics appearances (overview)
- 1936; 1948; 1952; 1956; 1960; 1964; 1968; 1972; 1976; 1980; 1984; 1988; 1992; 1994; 1998; 2002; 2006; 2010; 2014; 2018; 2022; 2026; 2030

Bulgaria competed at the 2014 Winter Olympics in Sochi, Russia, from 7 to 23 February 2014. The Bulgarian team consisted of 18 athletes in 6 sports. The team will also consist of 21 officials.

== Alpine skiing ==
According to the quota allocation released on 30 December 2013, Bulgaria qualified four athletes. The team was officially announced on 20 January 2014.

Athlete	Event	Run 1		Run 2		Total	
Athlete	Event	Time	Rank	Time	Rank	Time	Rank
Nikola Chongarov	Men's combined	1:58.68	41	53.73	18	2:52.41	23
Nikola Chongarov	Men's downhill	—				2:12.57	38
Nikola Chongarov	Men's slalom	51.12	40	DNF			
Nikola Chongarov	Men's super-G	—				1:22.59	39
Georgi Georgiev	Men's combined	1:57.69	38	DNF			
Georgi Georgiev	Men's downhill	—				2:12.49	36
Georgi Georgiev	Men's slalom	DNF					
Georgi Georgiev	Men's super-G	—				1:22.72	41
Stefan Prisadov	Men's giant slalom	DNF					
Stefan Prisadov	Men's slalom	DNF					
Maria Kirkova	Women's giant slalom	1:24.11	37	1:23.48	40	2:47.59	36
Maria Kirkova	Women's slalom	1:02.33	42	DNF			

== Biathlon ==
Based on their performance at the 2012 and 2013 Biathlon World Championships, Bulgaria qualified 5 men and 1 woman. The team was officially announced on 20 January 2014.

Men

Athlete	Event	Time	Misses	Rank
Krasimir Anev	Sprint	26:28.0	3 (3+0)	49
Krasimir Anev	Pursuit	38:47.6	5 (0+1+3+1)	48
Krasimir Anev	Individual	53:30.3	2 (0+0+2+0)	36
Vladimir Iliev	Sprint	26:55.9	4 (2+2)	60
Vladimir Iliev	Pursuit	39:44.6	7 (3+1+2+1)	55
Vladimir Iliev	Individual	53:52.6	3 (2+0+0+1)	39
Miroslav Kenanov	Individual	58:01.1	1 (0+0+1+0)	75
Michail Kletcherov	Sprint	27:13.6	2 (1+1)	70
Michail Kletcherov	Individual	56:41.8	2 (0+0+1+1)	68
Ivan Zlatev	Sprint	27:48.5	2 (1+1)	76
Krasimir Anev; Vladimir Iliev; Michail Kletcherov; Ivan Zlatev	Team relay	1:17:38.4	10 (2+8)	15

Women

Athlete	Event	Time	Misses	Rank
Desislava Stoyanova	Sprint	23:48.1	2 (1+1)	61
Desislava Stoyanova	Individual	54:41.1	6 (1+2+0+3)	72

== Cross-country skiing ==
According to the quota allocation released on 30 December 2013, Bulgaria qualified four athletes. The team was officially announced on 20 January 2014.

Distance

Athlete	Event	Classical		Freestyle		Final		
Athlete	Event	Time	Rank	Time	Rank	Time	Deficit	Rank
Andrey Gridin	Men's 30 km skiathlon	39:56.3	58	35:11.9	53	1:15:44.7	7:29.3	57
Andrey Gridin	Men's 50 km freestyle	—				1:51:41.7	+4:46.5	41
Veselin Tsinzov	Men's 15 km classical	—				42:06.3	+3:36.6	41
Veselin Tsinzov	Men's 30 km skiathlon	39:01.1	57	34:40.1	49	1:14:12.0	+5:56.6	53
Veselin Tsinzov	Men's 50 km freestyle	—				DNF		
Antoniya Grigorova-Burgova	Women's 15 km skiathlon	22:12.5	57	21:40.9	51	44:27.9	+5:54.3	56
Antoniya Grigorova-Burgova	Women's 30 km freestyle	—				1:23:05.6	+12:00.4	50
Teodora Malcheva	Women's 30 km freestyle	—				DNF		

Sprint

Athlete	Event	Qualification		Quarterfinal		Semifinal		Final	
Athlete	Event	Time	Rank	Time	Rank	Time	Rank	Time	Rank
Andrey Gridin	Men's sprint	3:50.57	64	Did not advance					
Andrey Gridin; Veselin Tsinzov	Men's team sprint	—				25:11.06	10	Did not advance	
Antoniya Grigorova-Burgova	Women's sprint	2:54.31	60	Did not advance					
Teodora Malcheva	Women's sprint	2:49.66	54	did not advance					

== Luge ==
Bulgaria received a reallocation quota spot in luge.

Athlete	Event	Run 1		Run 2		Run 3		Run 4		Total	
Athlete	Event	Time	Rank	Time	Rank	Time	Rank	Time	Rank	Time	Rank
Stanislav Benyov	Men's singles	55.040	38	55.006	37	54.558	36	54.476	38	3:39.080	38

== Ski jumping ==
According to the quota allocation released on 30 December 2013, Bulgaria qualified one athlete. The team was officially announced on 20 January 2014.

Athlete	Event	Qualification			First round			Final			Total	
Athlete	Event	Distance	Points	Rank	Distance	Points	Rank	Distance	Points	Rank	Points	Rank
Vladimir Zografski	Men's normal hill	89.0	97.8	43	Did not advance							
Vladimir Zografski	Men's large hill	112.0	87.9	39 Q	110.0	89.3	47	Did not advance				

== Snowboarding ==
According to the quota allocation released on 30 December 2013, Bulgaria qualified one athlete. The team was officially announced on 20 January 2014. Bulgaria also received a reallocation quota in men's parallel events.

Alpine

Athlete	Event	Qualification		Round of 16	Quarterfinal	Semifinal	Final	
Athlete	Event	Time	Rank	Opposition Time	Opposition Time	Opposition Time	Opposition Time	Rank
Radoslav Yankov	Men's giant slalom	1:42.08	25	Did not advance				
Radoslav Yankov	Men's slalom	1:00.24	21	Did not advance				

Snowboard cross

Athlete	Event	Seeding		Quarterfinal	Semifinal	Final	
Athlete	Event	Time	Rank	Position	Position	Position	Rank
Aleksandra Zhekova	Women's snowboard cross	1:24.29	11	2 Q	2 FA	5	5

Qualification legend: FA – Qualify to medal final; FB – Qualify to consolation final
