= Luge at the 2014 Winter Olympics =

Luge at the XXII Olympic Winter Games
- Venue: Sliding Center Sanki, Krasnaya Polyana, Russia
- Dates: 8–13 February 2014
- Competitors: 110 from 24 nations

Luge at the 2014 Winter Olympics was held at the Sliding Center Sanki near Krasnaya Polyana, Russia. The four events were scheduled for 8–13 February 2014.

In April 2011 the International Olympic Committee approved the addition of the mixed team relay event (one sled from each of the other three events compete per country), meaning luge will have four events on the program for the first time.

In December 2017, IOC concluded that two Russian lugers Albert Demchenko and Tatiana Ivanova had committed an anti-doping violation and stripped Russia of 2 silver medals. In January 2018, both athletes successfully appealed against the IOC decision at the Court of Arbitration for Sport and both medals were returned to Russia.

== Competition schedule ==
The following is the competition schedule for all four events. All times are (UTC+4).

Date	Time	Event
8 February	18:30	Men's singles runs 1 and 2
9 February	18:30	Men's singles runs 3 and 4
10 February	18:45	Women's singles runs 1 and 2
11 February	18:30	Women's singles runs 3 and 4
12 February	18:15	Doubles runs 1 and 2
13 February	20:15	Team relay

== Medal summary ==
=== Medal table ===
* Host nation (Russia)

Rank	Nation	Gold	Silver	Bronze	Total
1	Germany	4	1	0	5
2	Russia*	0	2	0	2
3	Austria	0	1	0	1
4	Latvia	0	0	2	2
5	Italy	0	0	1	1
5	United States	0	0	1	1
Totals (6 entries)		4	4	4	12

=== Events ===
Event	Gold		Silver		Bronze	
Men's singles	Felix Loch; Germany	3:27.526	Albert Demchenko; Russia	3:28.002	Armin Zöggeler; Italy	3:28.797
Women's singles	Natalie Geisenberger; Germany	3:19.768	Tatjana Hüfner; Germany	3:20.907	Erin Hamlin; United States	3:21.145
Doubles	Tobias Wendl and Tobias Arlt; Germany	1:38.933	Andreas Linger and Wolfgang Linger; Austria	1:39.455	Andris Šics and Juris Šics; Latvia	1:39.790
Team relay	Germany; Natalie Geisenberger; Felix Loch; Tobias Arlt; Tobias Wendl	2:45.649	Russia; Tatiana Ivanova; Albert Demchenko; Alexander Denisyev; Vladislav Antonov	2:46.679	Latvia; Elīza Tīruma; Mārtiņš Rubenis; Andris Šics; Juris Šics	2:47.295

== Qualification ==
A total quota of 110 athletes were allowed to compete at the Games. Countries were assigned quotas using the world rankings of results from 1 November 2012 to 31 December 2013.

== Participating nations ==
110 athletes from 24 nations were participating. Both Kazakhstan and Tonga (also making its Winter Olympics debut) marked their first Olympic appearances in the sport. India's athlete competed as an Independent Olympic Participants, as the Indian Olympic Association was suspended by the International Olympic Committee; the suspension was later lifted, but not before India's athlete had already competed under the Independent Olympic Participant banner. IOC decision to disqualify Russia was nullified by the Court of Arbitration for Sport.

- Australia (1 athlete)
- Austria (10)
- Bulgaria (1)
- Canada (8)
- Czech Republic (4)
- France (1)
- Germany (10)
- Independent Olympic Participants (1)
- Italy (10)
- Japan (1)
- Kazakhstan (1)
- Latvia (9)
- Moldova (1)
- Norway (3)
- Poland (5)
- Romania (4)
- Russia (10)
- Slovakia (6)
- South Korea (4)
- Switzerland (2)
- Chinese Taipei (1)
- Tonga (1)
- Ukraine (6)
- United States (10)
