= 2014 Winter Olympics =

Multi-sport event in Sochi, Russia

XXII Olympic Winter Games
- Emblem of the 2014 Winter Olympics
- Location: Sochi, Russia
- Motto: Hot. Cool. Yours. (Russian: Жаркие. Зимние. Твои., romanised: Zharkie. Zimnie. Tvoi)
- Nations: 88
- Athletes: 2,865 (1,762 men, 1,103 women)
- Events: 98 in 7 sports (15 disciplines)
- Opening: 7 February 2014
- Closing: 23 February 2014
- Opened by: President Vladimir Putin
- Closed by: IOC President Thomas Bach
- Cauldron: Irina Rodnina; Vladislav Tretiak
- Stadium: Fisht Olympic Stadium

The 2014 Winter Olympics, officially called the XXII Olympic Winter Games (Russian: XXII Олимпийские зимние игры, romanised: XXII Olimpiyskiye zimniye igry) and commonly known as Sochi 2014 (Сочи 2014), were an international winter multi-sport event that was held from 7 to 23 February 2014 in Sochi, Russia. Opening rounds in certain events were held on 6 February 2014, the day before the opening ceremony.

These were the first Olympic Games under the International Olympic Committee (IOC) presidency of Thomas Bach. Both the Olympics and Paralympics were organised by the Sochi Organizing Committee (SOOC). Sochi was selected as the host city on 4 July 2007, during the 119th IOC Session held in Guatemala City, Guatemala. It was the first Olympics to be held in a CIS state and former Warsaw Pact state after the Revolutions of 1989 and the collapse of the Soviet Union in 1991. The Russian Soviet Federative Socialist Republic previously hosted the Summer Olympics in 1980.

A record ninety-eight medal events in fifteen winter sport disciplines were held during the Games. A number of new competitions—a total of twelve accounting for gender—were held during the Games, including biathlon mixed relay, women's ski jumping, mixed-team figure skating, mixed-team luge, half-pipe skiing, ski and snowboard slopestyle, and snowboard parallel slalom. The events were held around two clusters of new venues: an Olympic Park constructed in Sochi's Imeretinsky Valley on the coast of the Black Sea, with Fisht Olympic Stadium, and the Games' indoor venues located within walking distance; and snow events in the resort settlement of Krasnaya Polyana.

The 2014 Winter Olympics were the most expensive Games in the history of the Olympics. While originally budgeted at US$12 billion, major cost overruns caused this figure to expand to US$51 billion, more than three times the cost of the 2012 London Olympics and even surpassing the estimated cost of US$44 billion for the 2008 Summer Olympics in Beijing. The 2014 Games achieved a record broadcast audience of 2.1 billion people worldwide.

In 2016, an independent report commissioned by the World Anti-Doping Agency confirmed allegations that the Russian Olympic team had been involved in a state-sponsored doping program, active from at least late 2011 through August 2015. The program was active during the Winter Olympics in Sochi, and athletes had benefited from the cover-up. The IOC stripped thirteen medals from Russian athletes in 2017, but nine were reinstated by the Court of Arbitration for Sport. In December 2017, the IOC voted to suspend the Russian Olympic Committee, with an option for whitelisted athletes to compete independently during the 2018 Winter Olympics.

== Bidding process ==
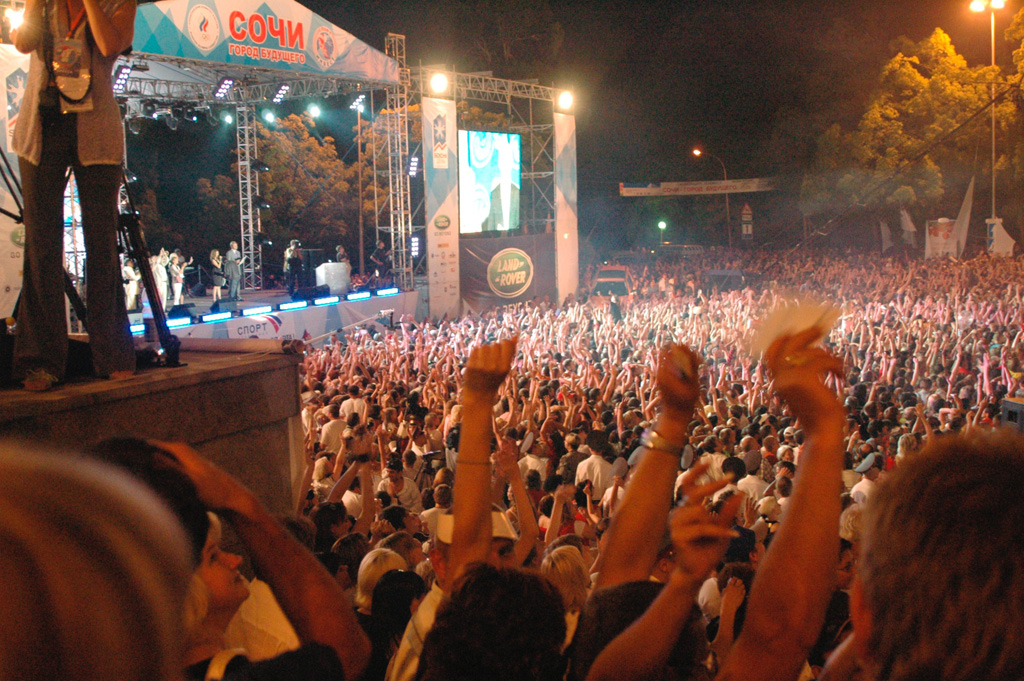
Fans celebrating Sochi's bid win

Sochi was elected on 4 July 2007 during the 119th International Olympic Committee (IOC) session held in Guatemala City, Guatemala, defeating bids from Salzburg, Austria; and Pyeongchang, South Korea. This is the first time that the Russian Federation has hosted the Winter Olympics. The Soviet Union was the host of the 1980 Summer Olympics held in and around Moscow.

2014 host city election – ballot results
City	Country	Round	
City	Country	1	2
Sochi	Russia	34	51
Pyeongchang	South Korea	36	47
Salzburg	Austria	25	—

== Cost and financing ==
As of October 2013, the estimated combined cost of the 2014 Winter Olympics had topped US$51 billion. This amount included the cost for Olympic games themselves and cost of Sochi infrastructural projects (roads, railroads, power plants). This total is over four times the initial budget of $12 billion (compared to the $8 billion spent for the 2010 Winter Olympics in Vancouver), and made the Sochi games the most expensive Olympics in history, exceeding the estimated $44 billion cost of the 2008 Summer Olympics in Beijing, which hosted 3 times as many events. Dmitry Kozak was the main overseer for the events in Sochi.

In its final budget published in June 2014, Olimpstroy—the state corporation that oversaw the Sochi Olympics development—reported the total allocated funds for the 2014 Sochi Winter Olympics of 1,524 billion rubles (US$49.5 billion). However, only about a fifth of that budget ($10.8 billion) was directly related to the Olympic games, while the rest went into urban and regional regeneration and the conversion of the Sochi region into an all-year round sea and alpine resort. The breakdown table below is based on a report that has analysed the distribution of Olimpstroy's $49.5 billion budget. Estimates also suggest that additional unrecoverable operational costs (including for security) could have added another $3 billion.

=== The breakdown of the 2014 Sochi Winter Olympics costs ===
Costs breakdown
Item	Cost	
Item	million RUB	million US$
Direct Olympics costs (a)+(b)+(c)	331,098	10,753
(a) Olympic venues	221,592	7,197
Coastal Cluster	96,366	3,130
Fisht Olympic Stadium	18,994	617
Bolshoy Ice Dome	10,102	328
Shayba Arena	3,484	113
Adler Arena Skating Centre	7,406	241
Iceberg Skating Palace	8,127	264
Ice Cube Curling Centre	735	24
Main Media Centre	17,426	566
The Olympic Park	9,871	321
Olympic Village (3000 places)	12,217	397
A complex for Olympic partners (1285 apartments)	8,003	260
Mountain Cluster	125,226	4,067
Rosa Khutor Extreme Park (freestyle skiing, snowboarding)	3,393	110
Rosa Khutor Alpine Skiing Centre	11,911	387
Sanki Sliding Centre (bobsleigh, luge, skeleton)	7,487	243
RusSki Gorki Jumping Centre (ski jumps, Nordic combined)	9,889	321
Laura Centre (biathlon and cross-country) and Olympic Village (1100 places)	74,525	2,420
Main Alpine Olympic Village (2600 places) at Rosa Khutor	18,021	585
(b) Site preparation and supporting infrastructure	85,370	2,773
Key infrastructure for Olympic venues (roads, energy, water, waste, security), planning and other works	81,413	2,644
SOCOG office building	3,957	129
(c) Operational costs (part of)	24,135	784
Opening/closing ceremonies (equipment and organisation)	3,444	112
Broadcasting and photo equipment	13,330	433
Vehicles for visitors and logistics	6,958	226
Live Sites city programme	403	13
INDIRECT COSTS (d)+(e)	1,193,348	38,758
(d) Skiing and tourist resorts	189,937	6,169
Gazprom Alpine Tourist Centre	60,723	1,972
Rosa Khutor	35,078	1,139
Gornaya Karusel/Gorky Gorod	72,728	2,362
Alpika Service	21,408	695
(e) Other projects	1,003,411	32,589
Hotels and health resorts	130,755	4,247
Formula One racing	11,982	389
Olympic University	12,946	420
Combined road and railroad linking the two clusters	317,224	10,303
Railways and rail terminals	38,015	1,235
Road infrastructure	189,532	6,156
Sochi Airport	22,895	744
Sochi Seaport	27,673	899
Housing projects	11,379	370
Power generation and grids	74,305	2,413
Gasification projects	46,048	1,496
Other engineering, water, waste, telecommunications and other infrastructure	104,912	3,407
Nature and culture parks	11,346	369
Two hospitals	4,399	143
Total (a)+(b)+(c)+(d)+(e)	1,524,445	49,511

== Venues ==
Location of Sochi on the eastern coast of the Black Sea in Europe.

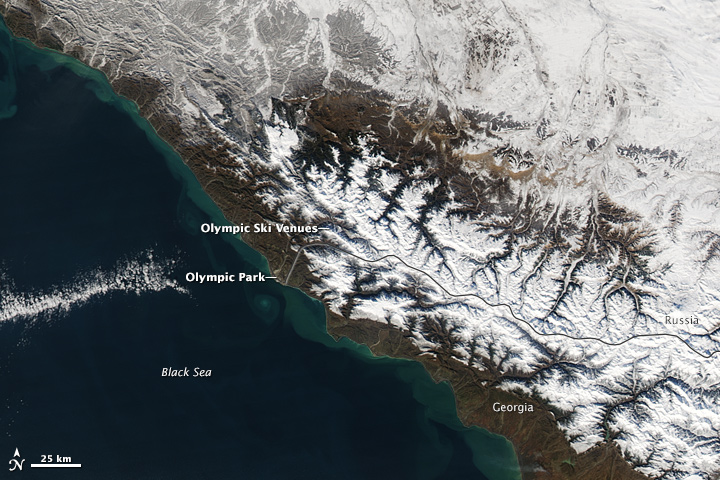
Sochi from space, showing locations of Olympic park and ski venues

With an average February temperature of 8.3 °C (46.9 °F) and a humid subtropical climate, Sochi is the warmest city to host a Winter Olympic Games. Sochi 2014 is the 12th straight Olympics to outlaw smoking; all Sochi venues, Olympic Park bars and restaurants and public areas were smoke-free during the Games. It is also the first time that an Olympic Park has been built for hosting winter games.

=== Sochi Olympic Park (Coastal Cluster) ===
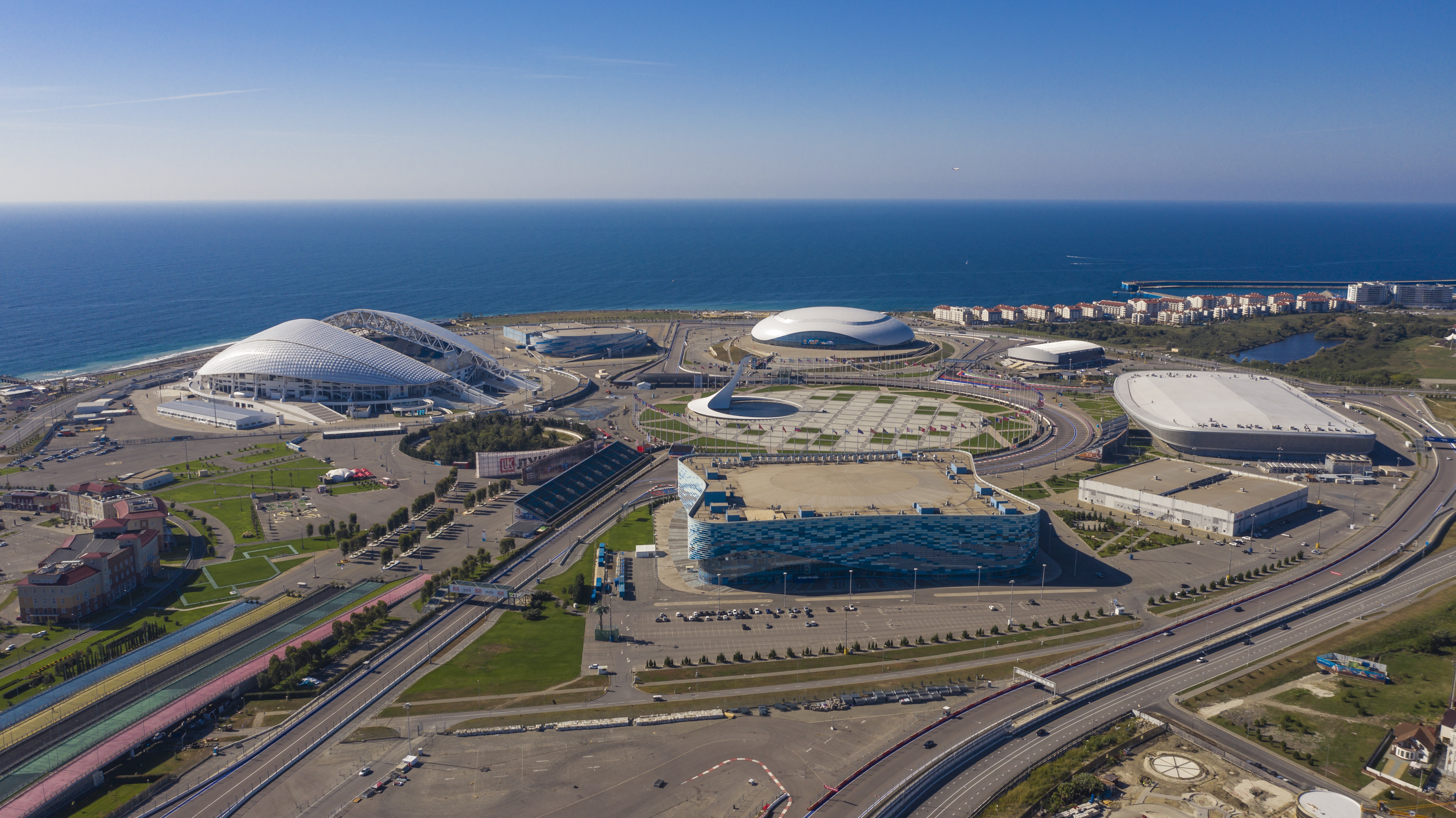
Aerial view of the Sochi Olympic Park

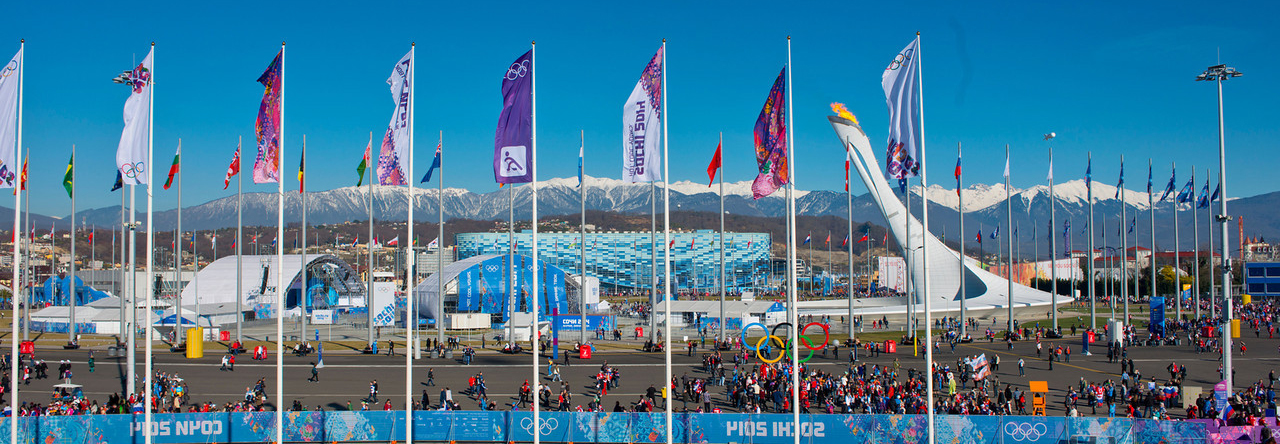
Panoramic view of the Sochi Olympic Park

The Sochi Olympic Park was built by the Black Sea coast in the Imeretinsky Valley, about 4 km (2.5 miles) from Russia's border with Abkhazia/Georgia. The venues were clustered around a central water basin on which the Medals Plaza is built, allowing all indoor venues to be within walking distance. It also features "The Waters of the Olympic Park" (designed by California-based company WET), a choreographed fountain which served as the backdrop in the medals awards and the opening and closing ceremonies of the event. The new venues include:

- Fisht Olympic Stadium – ceremonies (opening/closing) 40,000 spectators
- Bolshoy Ice Dome – ice hockey (final), 12,000 spectators
- Shayba Arena – ice hockey, 7,000 spectators
- Adler Arena Skating Center – speed skating, 8,000 spectators
- Iceberg Skating Palace – figure skating, short track speed skating, 12,000 spectators
- Ice Cube Curling Center – curling, 3,000 spectators
- Main Olympic village
- International broadcasting centre and main press room
A sketch of the layout of Sochi Olympic Park.

=== Krasnaya Polyana (Mountain Cluster) ===
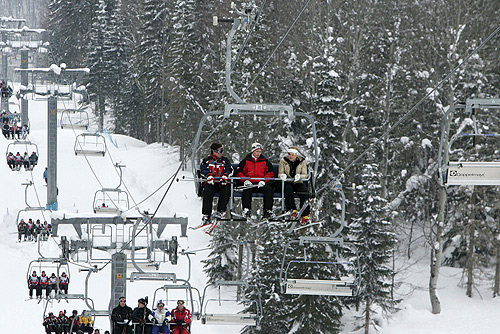
Chairlift in Krasnaya Polyana

- Laura Biathlon & Ski Complex – biathlon, cross-country skiing
- Rosa Khutor Extreme Park – freestyle skiing and snowboarding
- Rosa Khutor Alpine Resort – alpine skiing
- Sliding Center Sanki – bobsleigh, luge and skeleton
- RusSki Gorki Jumping Center – ski jumping and Nordic combined (both ski jumping and cross-country skiing on a 2 km route around the arena)
- Roza Khutor plateau Olympic Village
2014 Winter Olympics Mountain Cluster Venues

=== Post-Olympic usage ===
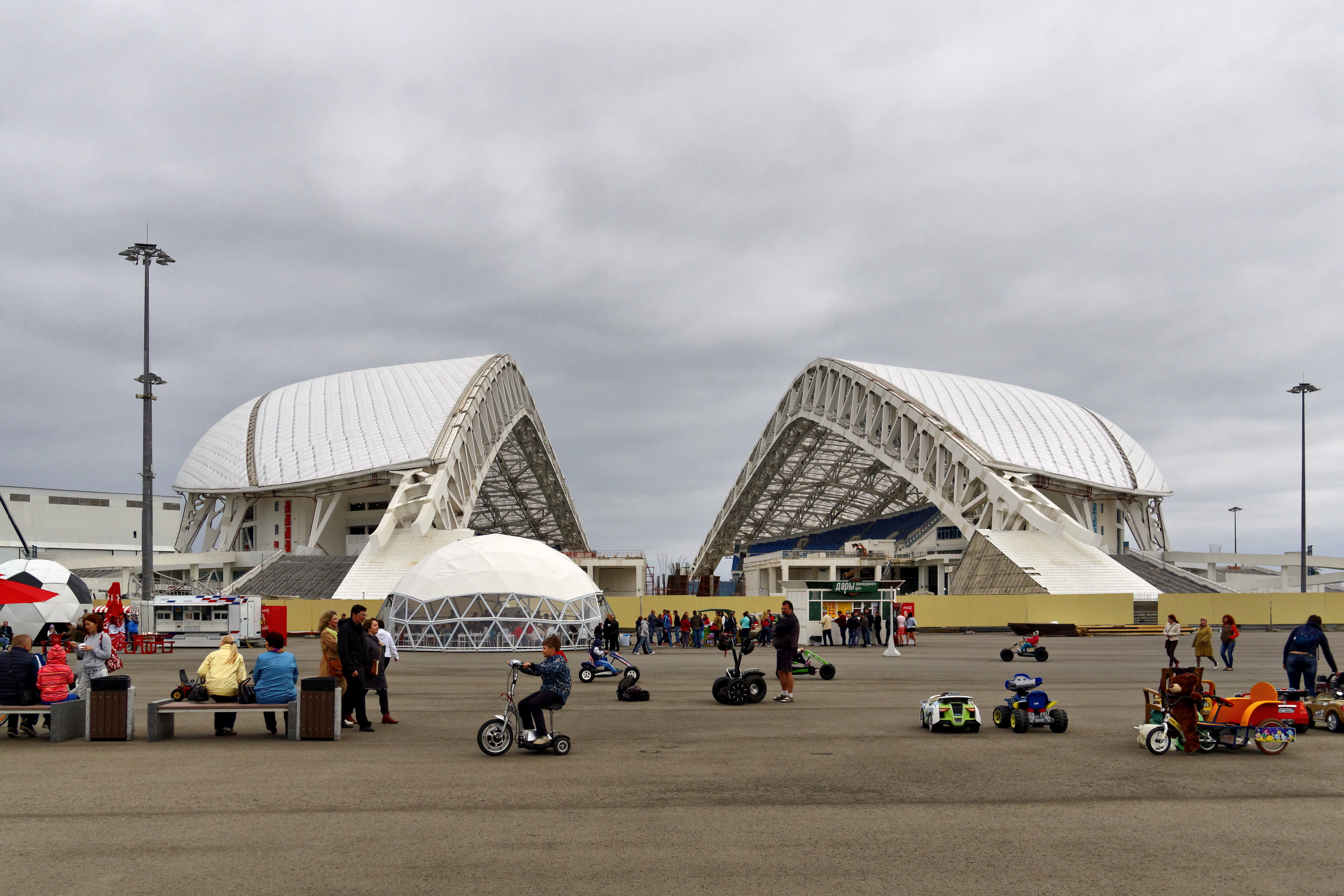
Fisht Olympic Stadium under re-construction in 2015.

A street circuit known as the Sochi Autodrom was constructed in and around Olympic Park. Its primary use is to host the Formula One Russian Grand Prix, which held its inaugural edition in October 2014.

In January 2015, work began on adapting Fisht Olympic Stadium into an open-air football stadium to host matches during the 2018 FIFA World Cup.

A new ice hockey team in the Kontinental Hockey League, HC Sochi Leopards, now plays in Bolshoy Arena.

== Construction ==
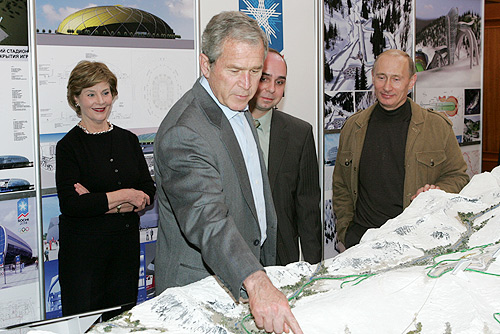
Vladimir Putin with George W. Bush and Laura Bush examining the models of the Olympic facilities for Sochi, April 2008

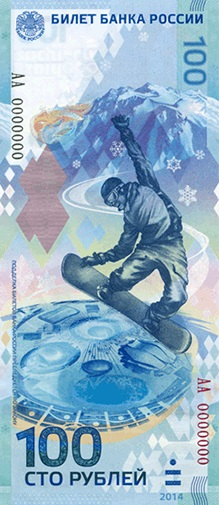
100 Russian ruble banknote issued in 2013 by the Central Bank of Russia

The Olympic infrastructure was constructed according to a Federal Target Program (FTP). In June 2009, the Games' organisers reported they were one year ahead in building the main Olympic facilities as compared to recent Olympic Games. In November 2011, IOC President Jacques Rogge was in Sochi and concluded that the city had made significant progress since he last visited eighteen months earlier.

=== Telecommunications ===
According to the FTP, US$580 million would be spent on construction and modernisation of telecommunications in the region. Avaya was named by the Sochi Organizing Committee as the official supplier of telecommunications equipment. Avaya provided the data network equipment, including switches, routers, security, telephones and contact-centre systems. It provided engineers and technicians to design and test the systems, and worked with other technology partners to provide athletes, dignitaries and fans information about the Games.

The 2014 Olympics is the first "fabric-enabled" Games using Shortest Path Bridging (SPB) technology. The network is capable of handling up to 54 Tbit/s of traffic.

Infrastructure built for the games included:

- A network of TETRA mobile radio communications for 100 user groups (with capacity of 10,000 subscribers);
- 712 km (442 mi) of fibre-optic cables along the Anapa-Dzhubga-Sochi highways and Dzhubga–Krasnodar branch;
- Digital broadcasting infrastructure, including radio and television broadcasting stations (building and communications towers) with coverage from Grushevaya Polyana (Pear Glade) to Sochi and Anapa cities. The project also included construction of infocommunications centre for broadcasting abroad via three HDTV satellites.

During the Games, the core networks of Rostelecom and Transtelekom were used.

In January 2012, the newest equipment for the television coverage of the Games arrived in the port of Adler. Prepared specifically for the Games, a team of regional specialists and the latest technology provide a qualitatively new level of television production in the region.

The fibre-optic channel links Sochi between Adler and Krasnaya Polyana. The 46-kilometre-long (29 mi) channel enables videoconferencing and news reporting from the Olympics.

In November 2013, it was reported that the fibre-optic cable that was built by the Federal Communications Agency, Rossvyaz, had no operator. With Rostelecom and Megafon both refusing to operate it, the line was transferred to the ownership of the state enterprise Center for Monitoring & Development of Infocommunication Technologies (Russian: Центр МИР ИТ).

Russian mobile phone operator Megafon expanded and improved Sochi's telecom infrastructure with over 700 new 2G/3G/4G cell towers. Sochi was the first Games to offer 4G connectivity at a speed of 10 MB/sec.

In January 2014, Rostelecom reported that it had connected the Olympic media centre in Sochi to the Internet and organised channels of communication with the main media centre of the Olympic Games in the coastal cluster and press centre in Moscow. The media centre was built at total cost of 17 million rubles.

=== Power infrastructure ===
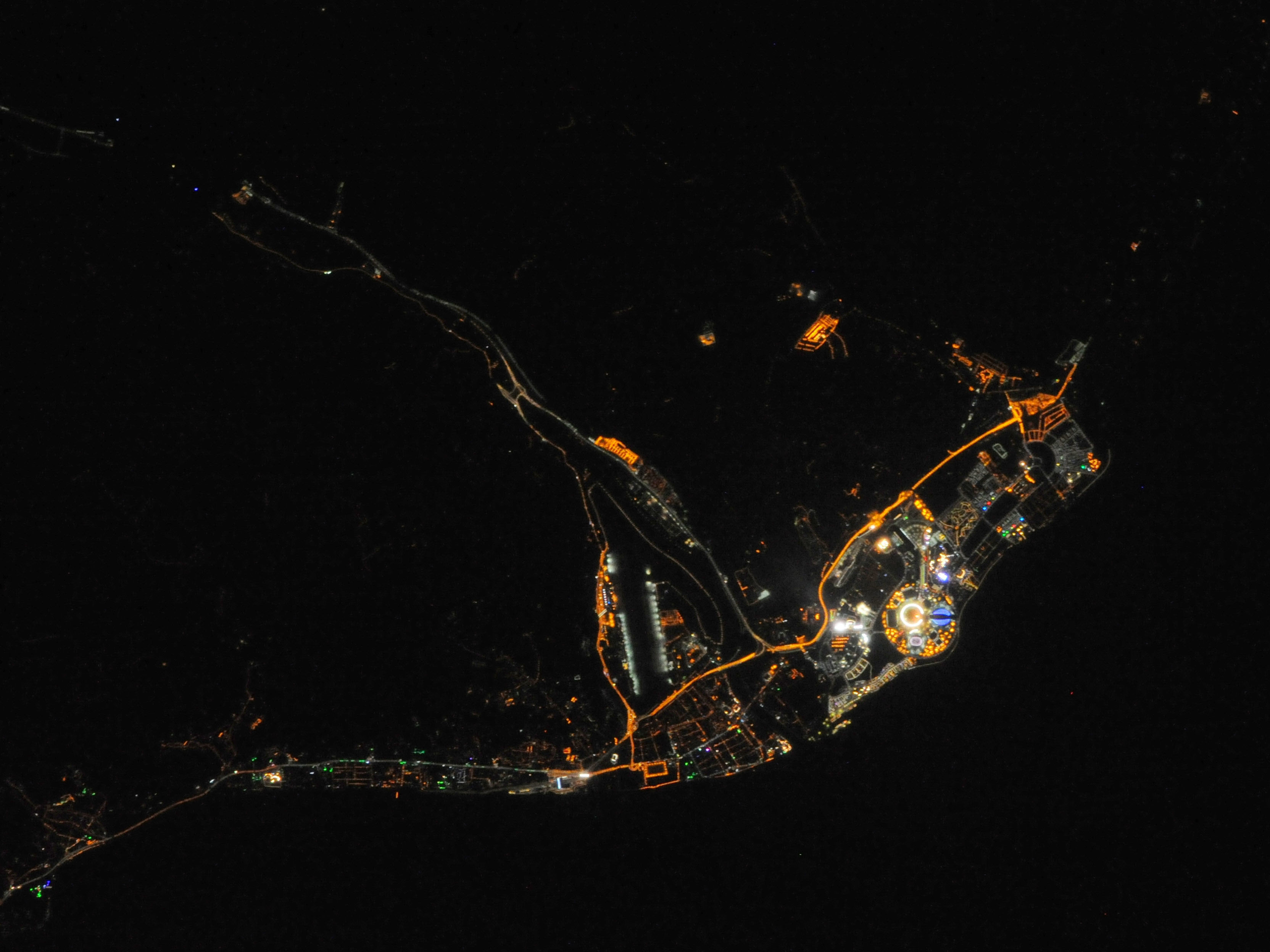
Night view of Sochi during the Olympics, taken by Expedition 38 members from the International Space Station

A five-year strategy for increasing the power supply of the Sochi region was presented by Russian energy experts during a seminar on 29 May 2009, held by the Sochi 2014 Organizing Committee, and attended by International Olympic Committee (IOC) experts and officials from the Russian Ministry of Regional Development, the Russian Ministry of Energy, the State Corporation Olimpstroy and the Krasnodar Krai administration.

According to the strategy, the capacity of the regional energy network would increase by two and a half times by 2014, guaranteeing a stable power supply during and after the Games.

The power demand of Sochi at the end of May 2009 was 424 MW. The power demand of the Olympic infrastructure was expected to be about 340 MW.

- Poselkovaya electrical substation became operational in early 2009.
- Sochi thermal power station reconstructed (expected power output was 160 MW)
- Laura and Rosa Khutor electrical substations were completed in November 2010
- Mzymta electrical substation was completed in March 2011
- Krasnopolyanskaya hydroelectric power station was completed in 2010
- Adler CHP station design and construction was completed in 2012. Expected power output was 360 MW
- Bytkha substation, under construction with two transformers 25 MW each, includes dependable microprocessor-based protection

Earlier plans also include building combined cycle (steam and gas) power stations near the cities of Tuapse and Novorossiysk and construction of a cable-wire powerline, partially on the floor of the Black Sea.

=== Transportation ===
The transport infrastructure prepared to support the Olympics includes many roads, tunnels, bridges, interchanges, railroads and stations in and around Sochi. Among others, 8 flyovers, 102 bridges, tens of tunnels and a bypass route for heavy trucks – 367 km (228 mi) of roads were paved.

The Sochi Light Metro is located between Adler and Krasnaya Polyana connecting the Olympic Park, Sochi International Airport, and the venues in Krasnaya Polyana.

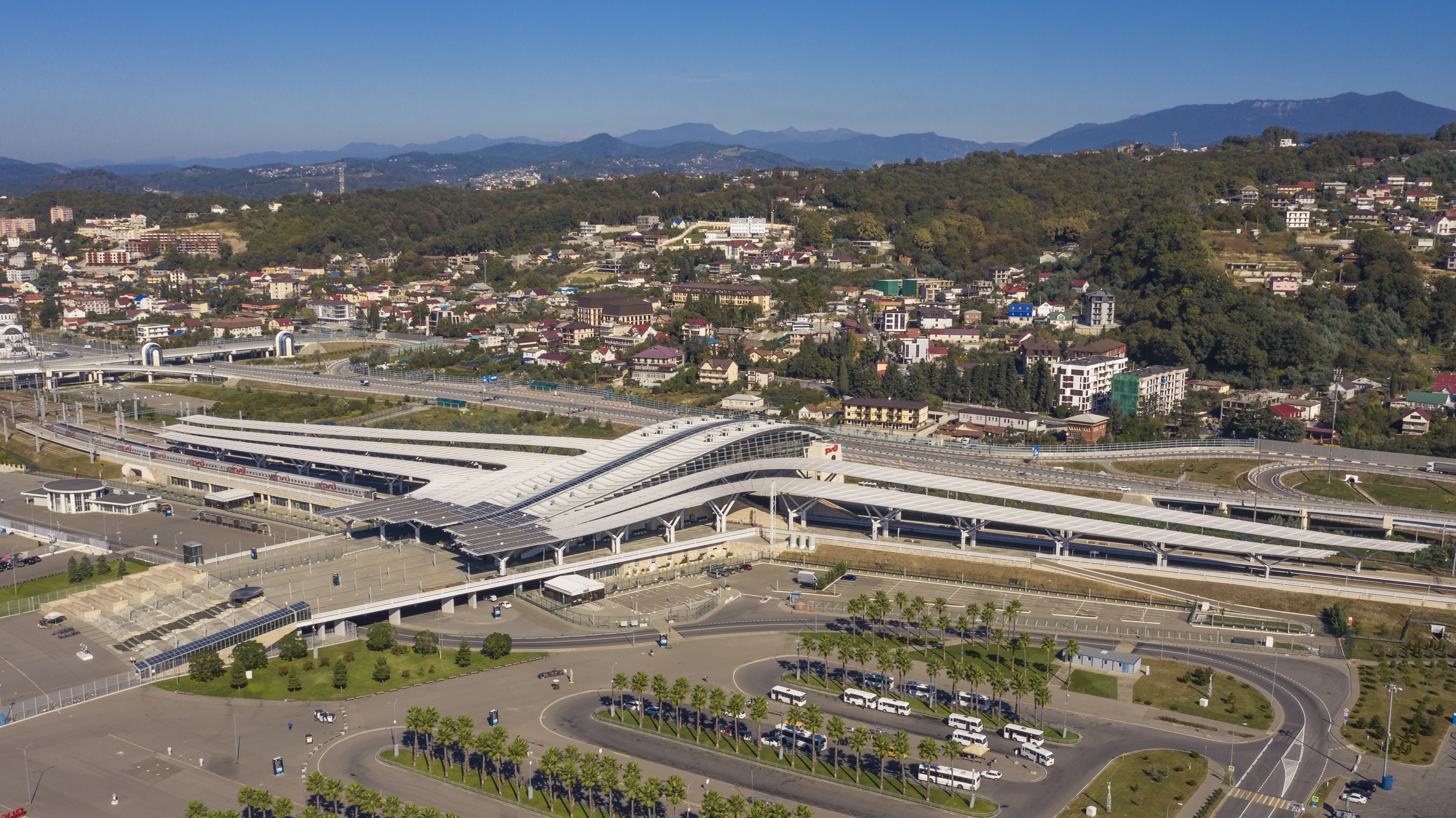
Olympic Park railway station

The existing 102 km (63-mile), Tuapse-to-Adler railroad was renovated to provide double track throughout, increasing capacity and enabling a reliable regional service to be provided and extending to the airport. In December 2009, Russian Railways ordered 38 Siemens Mobility Desiro trains for delivery in 2013 for use during the Olympics, with an option for a further 16 partly built in Russia.

At Sochi International Airport, a new terminal was built along a 3.5 km (2.2-mile) runway extension, overlapping the Mzymta River.

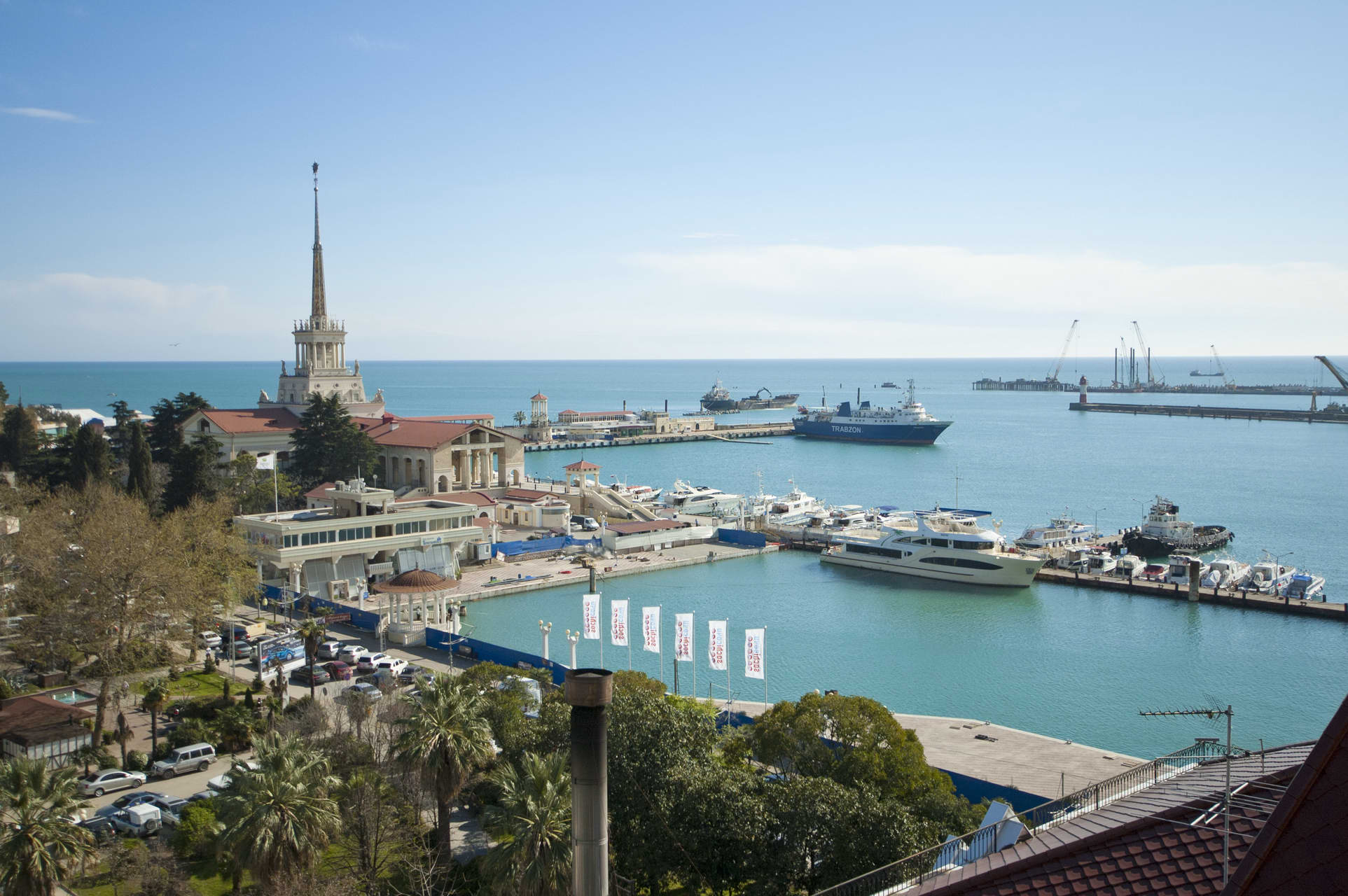
Sochi seaport

At the Port of Sochi, a new offshore terminal 1.5 km (0.93 mi) from the shore allows docking for cruise ships with capacities of 3,000 passengers. The cargo terminal of the seaport would be moved from the centre of Sochi.

Roadways were detoured, some going around the construction site and others being cut off.

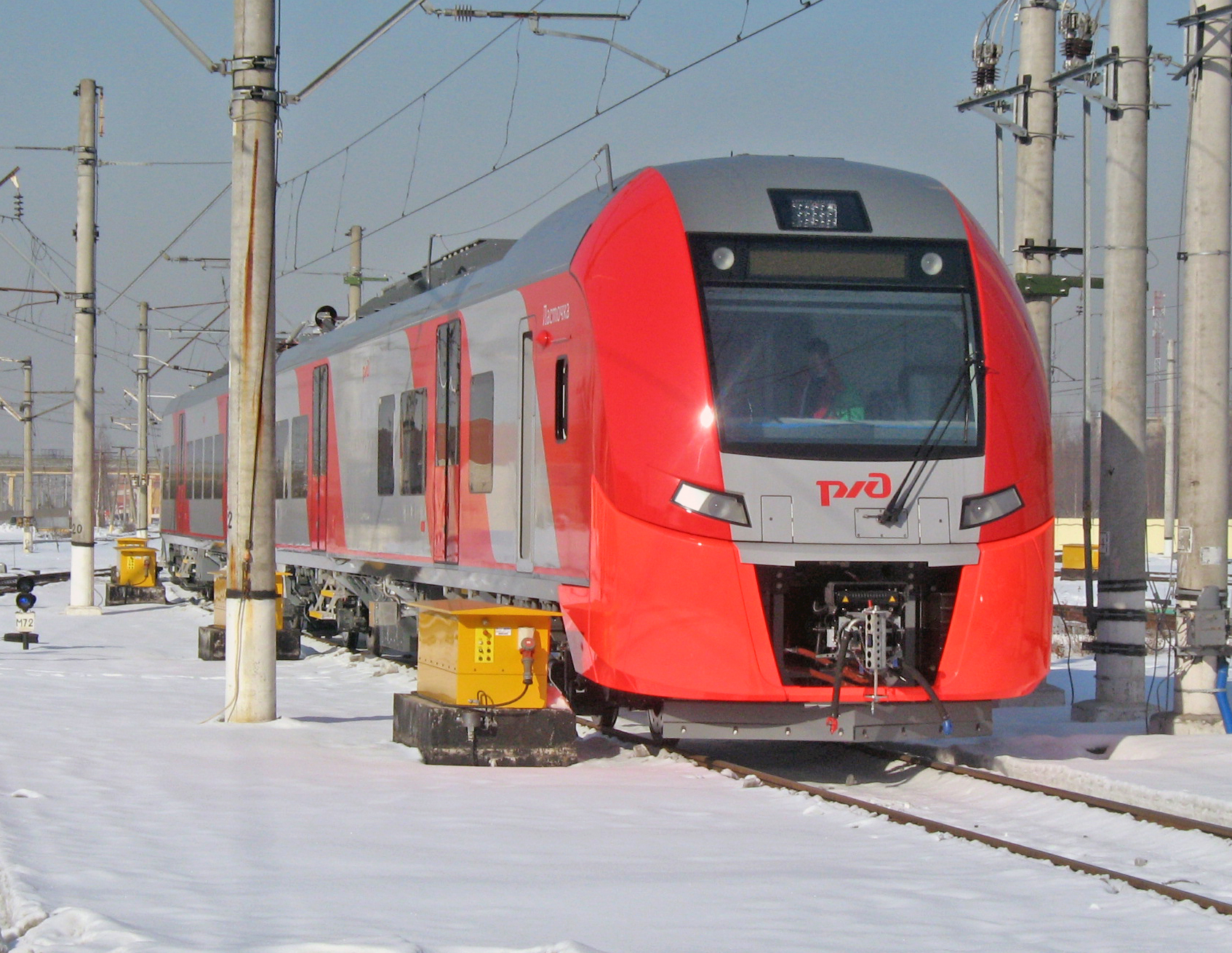
A "Lastochka" (Siemens Desiro) train, which serves the Tuapse–Sochi route

In May 2009, Russian Railways started the construction of tunnel complex No. 1 (the final total is six) on the combined road (automobile and railway) from Adler to Alpica Service Mountain Resort in the Krasnaya Polyana region. The tunnel complex No. 1 is located near Akhshtyr in Adlersky City District, and includes:

- Escape tunnel, 2.25 kilometres (1.40 mi), completed in 2010
- Road tunnel, 2,153 metres (7,064 ft), completed in 2013
- One-track railway tunnel, 2,473 metres (8,114 ft), completed in 2013

Russian Railways president Vladimir Yakunin stated the road construction costed more than 200 billion rubles.

In addition, Sochi's railway stations were renovated. These are Dagomys, Sochi, Matsesta, Khosta, Lazarevskaya, and Loo railway stations. In Adler, a new railway station was built while the original building was preserved, and in the Olympic park cluster, a new station was built from scratch, the Olympic Park railway station. Another new railway station was built in Estosadok, close to Krasnaya Polyana.

=== Other infrastructure ===
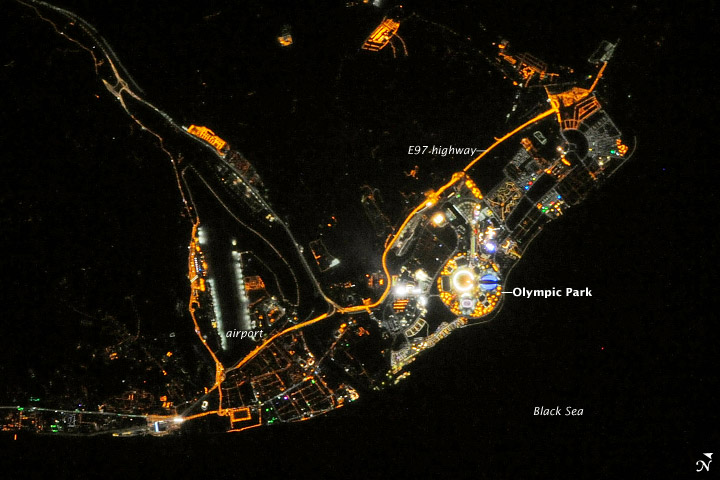
Sochi at night from space

Funds were spent on the construction of hotels for 10,300 guests. The first of the Olympic hotels, Zvezdny (Stellar), was rebuilt anew. Significant funds were spent on the construction of an advanced sewage treatment system in Sochi, designed by Olimpstroy. The system meets BREF standards and employs top available technologies for environment protection, including tertiary treatment with microfiltration.

Six post offices were opened at competition venues, two of them in the main media centre in Olympic Park and in the mountain village of Estosadok. In addition to standard services, customers had access to unique services including two new products, Fotomarka and Retropismo. Fotomarka presents an opportunity to get a stylised sheet of eight souvenir stamps with one's own photos, using the services of a photographer in the office. Retropismo service allows a customer to write with their own stylus or pen on antique paper with further letters, winding string and wax seal affixing. All the new sites and post offices in Sochi were opened during the Olympics until late night 7 days a week, and employees were trained to speak English.

== The Games ==
=== Torch relay ===
Torch relay in Moscow

On 29 September 2013, the Olympic torch was lit in Ancient Olympia, beginning a seven-day journey across Greece and on to Russia, then the torch relay started at Moscow on 7 October 2013 before passing 83 Russian cities and arriving at Sochi on the day of the opening ceremony, 7 February 2014. It is the longest torch relay in Olympic history, a 60,000-kilometre (40,000-mile) route that passes through all regions of the country, from Kaliningrad in the west to Chukotka in the east.

The Olympic torch reached the North Pole for first time via a nuclear-powered icebreaker (50 Let Pobedy). The torch was also passed for the first time in space, though not lit for the duration of the flight for safety reasons, on flight Soyuz TMA-11M to the International Space Station (ISS). The spacecraft itself was adorned with Olympic-themed livery including the Games' emblem. Russian cosmonauts Oleg Kotov and Sergey Ryazansky waved the torch on a spacewalk outside the ISS. The torch returned to Earth five days later on board Soyuz TMA-09M. The torch also reached Europe's highest mountain, Mount Elbrus, and Siberia's Lake Baikal.

=== Opening ceremony ===
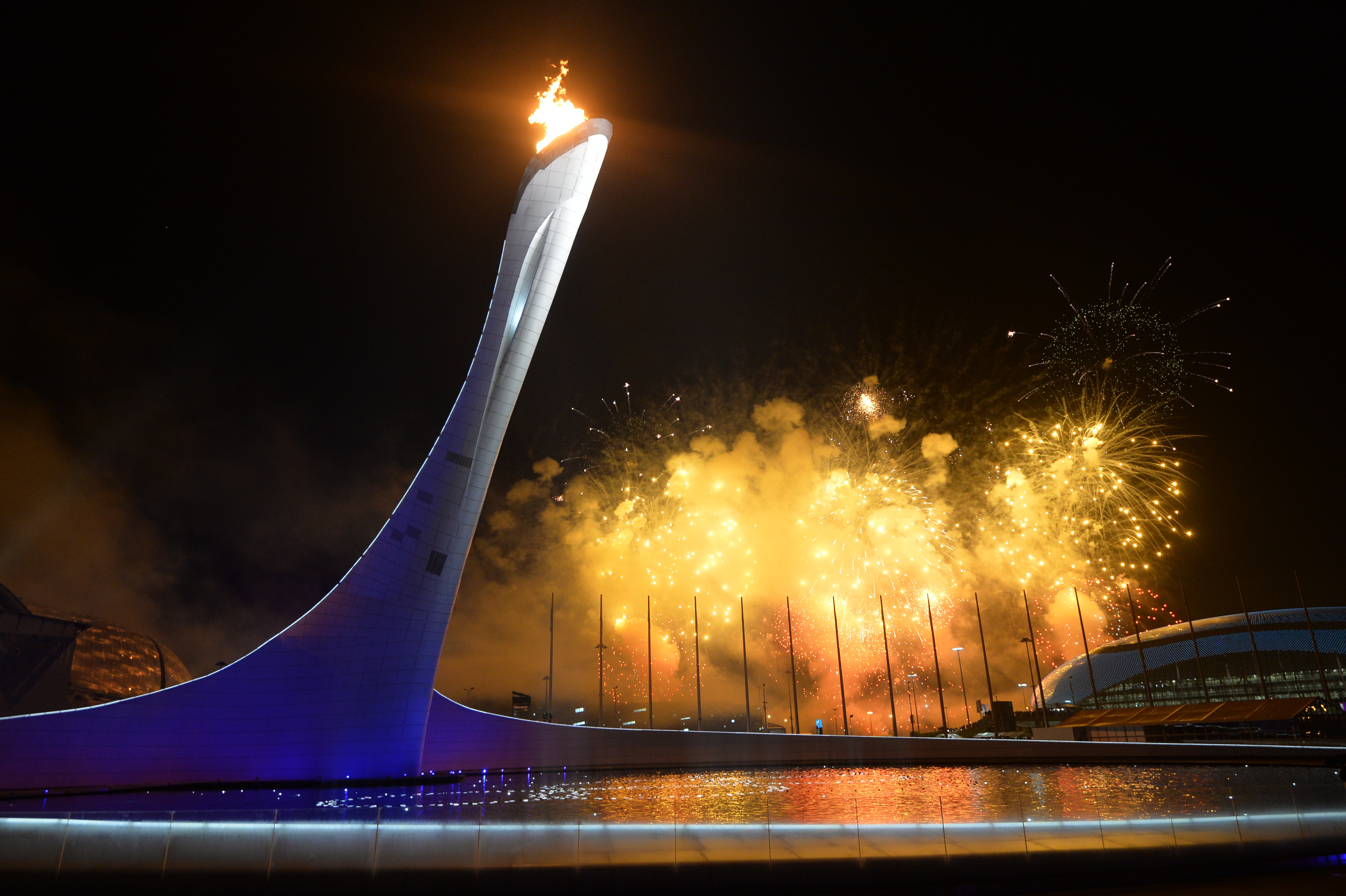
Fireworks over Fisht Olympic Stadium following the lighting of the Olympic Cauldron.

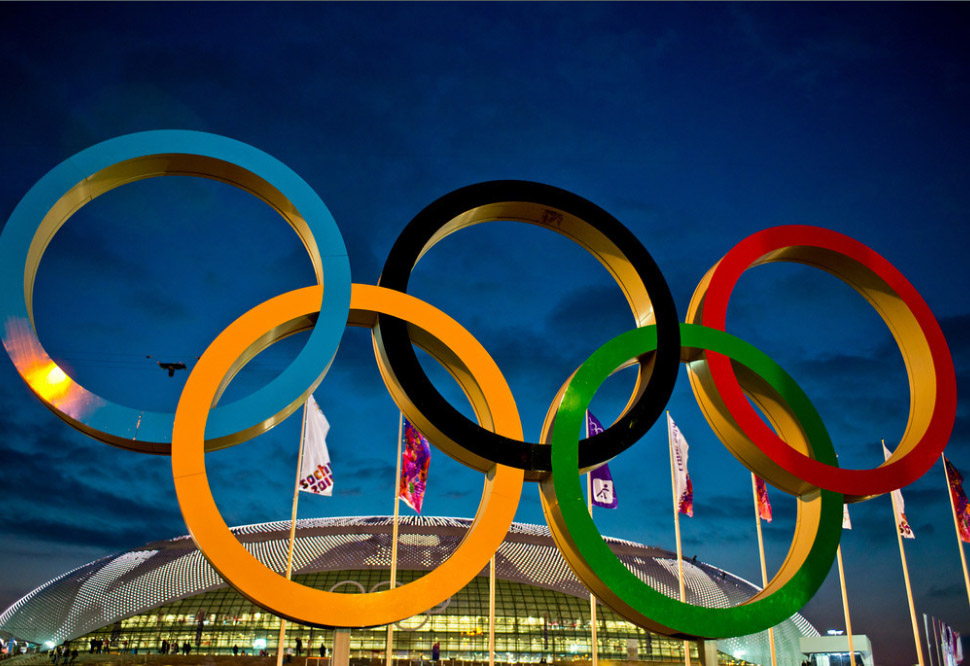
The Olympic Rings at Sochi Olympic Park

The opening ceremony of the 2014 Winter Olympics was held on 7 February 2014 at Fisht Olympic Stadium, an indoor arena built specifically for the ceremonies. The ceremony featured scenes based around aspects of Russian history and arts, including ballet, classical music, the Russian Revolution, and the age of the Soviet Union. The opening scene of the ceremony featured a notable technical error, where one of five snowflakes, which were to expand to form the Olympic rings, malfunctioned and did not expand (a mishap mocked by the organisers at the closing ceremony where one of the roundrelay dance groups symbolising the Olympic rings "failed" to expand). The torch was taken into the stadium by Maria Sharapova, who then passed it to Yelena Isinbayeva who, in turn, passed it to wrestler Aleksandr Karelin. Karelin then passed the torch to gymnast Alina Kabaeva. Figure skater Irina Rodnina took the torch and was met by former ice hockey goalkeeper Vladislav Tretiak, who exited the stadium to jointly light the Olympic cauldron located near the centre of Olympic Park.

=== Participating National Olympic Committees ===
A record 88 nations qualified to compete, which beat the previous record of 82 set at the previous Winter Olympics in Vancouver. The number of athletes who qualified per country is listed in the table below (number of athletes shown in parentheses). Seven nations made their Winter Olympics debut: Dominica, Malta, Paraguay, Timor-Leste, Togo, Tonga, and Zimbabwe. Meanwhile, the Philippines returned to the Winter games after a 22-year absence, and Thailand, Virgin Islands, Luxembourg and Venezuela returned after 8 years. The Winter debut of Malta meant that for the first time ever, all of the current members of the European Olympic Committees participated at the Winter Olympics.

Kristina Krone qualified to compete in her second consecutive games for Puerto Rico, but the island's Olympic Committee once again chose not to send her to compete. Similarly, South Africa decided not to send alpine skier Sive Speelman to Sochi. Algeria also did not enter its only qualified athlete, Mehdi-Selim Khelifi.

India's athletes originally competed as Independent Olympic Participants and marched under the Olympic flag during the opening ceremony, as India was originally suspended in December 2012 over the election process of the Indian Olympic Association. On 11 February, the Indian Olympic Association was reinstated and India's athletes were allowed the option to compete under their own flag from that time onward. Although Shiva Keshavan competed as an Independent athlete and is recorded as such, he was permitted to walk under the flag of India at the closing ceremony.

The participating countries at the 2014 Winter Olympics Debuting countries at the Winter Olympics Yellow circle is host city (Sochi)

Number of participating athletes by country: 100+ / 30–99 / 10–29 / 4–9 / 1–3

Participating National Olympic Committees (number of qualifying athletes)
Albania (2); Andorra (6); Argentina (7); Armenia (4); Australia (60); Austria (130); Azerbaijan (4); Belarus (25); Belgium (7); Bermuda (1); Bosnia and Herzegovina (5); Brazil (13); British Virgin Islands (1); Bulgaria (18); Canada (217); Cayman Islands (1); Chile (6); China (66); Chinese Taipei (3); Croatia (11); Cyprus (2); Czech Republic (88); Denmark (12); Dominica (2); Estonia (25); Finland (103); France (116); Georgia (4); Germany (153); Great Britain (56); Greece (7); Hong Kong (1); Hungary (16); Iceland (5); India (2); Iran (5); Ireland (5); Israel (5); Italy (113); Jamaica (2); Japan (113); Kazakhstan (52); Kyrgyzstan (1); Latvia (58); Lebanon (2); Liechtenstein (4); Lithuania (9); Luxembourg (1); Macedonia (3); Malta (1); Mexico (1); Moldova (4); Monaco (5); Mongolia (2); Montenegro (2); Morocco (2); Nepal (1); Netherlands (41); New Zealand (15); Norway (134); Pakistan (1); Paraguay (1); Peru (3); Philippines (1); Poland (58); Portugal (2); Romania (24); Russia (232) (host); San Marino (2); Serbia (8); Slovakia (63); Slovenia (66); South Korea (71); Spain (20); Sweden (106); Switzerland (163); Tajikistan (1); Thailand (2); Timor-Leste (1); Togo (2); Tonga (1); Turkey (6); Ukraine (43); United States (222); Uzbekistan (3); Venezuela (1); Virgin Islands (1); Zimbabwe (1)
NOCs that participated in 2010, but not in 2014.	NOCs that participated in 2014, but not in 2010.
Algeria; Colombia; Ethiopia; Ghana; North Korea; Senegal; South Africa	British Virgin Islands; Dominica; Timor-Leste; Luxembourg; Malta; Paraguay; Philippines; Thailand; Togo; Tonga; Venezuela; Virgin Islands; Zimbabwe

==== National houses ====
During the Games some countries had a national house, a meeting place for supporters, athletes and other followers. Houses could be either free for visitors to access or have limited access by invitation only.

Nation	Location	Name	Website
Austria	Mountain Cluster	Austria Tirol House	
Canada	Coastal Cluster (Next to Fisht Olympic Stadium)	Canada House	
China	Zhemchuzhina hotel	China House	
Czech Republic	Adler	Czech House	
France	Gornaya Karusel (Mountain Cluster)	Club France	Official website
Germany	Estosadok, Krasnaya Polyana (Mountain Cluster)	German House	Official website
Italy	Olympic Park (Coastal Cluster)	Italy House	Official website
Japan	Olympic Park (Coastal Cluster)	Japan House	
Latvia	Radisson Hotel	Latvian House	
Netherlands	Azimut Hotel Resort (near Coastal Cluster)	Holland Heineken House	Official website
Russia	Olympic Park (Coastal Cluster)	Russia House	
Slovakia	Sochi railway station	Slovak Point	
South Korea	Olympic Park (Coastal Cluster)	Korea House	
Switzerland	Olympic Park (Coastal Cluster)	House of Switzerland	Official website
United States	Olympic Park (Coastal Cluster)	USA House	Official website

=== Sports ===
The 2014 Winter Olympics featured 98 medal events over 15 disciplines in 7 sports. A total of twelve new events were contested, making it the largest Winter Olympics to date.

1. Biathlon
  - Biathlon (11)
2. Bobsleigh
  - Bobsleigh (3)
  - Skeleton (2)
3. Curling
  - Curling (2)
4. Ice hockey
  - Ice hockey (2)
5. Luge
  - Luge (4)
6. Skating
  - Figure skating (5)
  - Short track speed skating (8)
  - Speed skating (12)
7. Skiing
  - Alpine skiing (10)
  - Cross-country skiing (12)
  - Freestyle skiing (10)
  - Nordic combined (3)
  - Ski jumping (4)
  - Snowboarding (10)

Numbers in parentheses indicate the number of medal events contested in each separate discipline.

==== New events ====
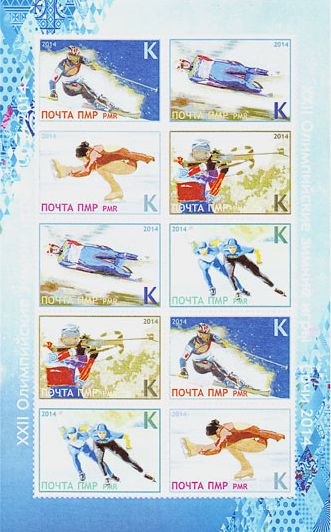
Postage stamps of Transnistria, Sochi Olympic Games (2014)

On 6 April 2011, the IOC accepted a number of events that were submitted by their respective sports federations to be considered for inclusion into the official program of these Olympic Games. The events included a Figure skating team event, Women's ski jumping, Mixed relay biathlon, Ski half-pipe, and Team relay luge.

On 4 July 2011, the IOC announced that three events would be added to the program. These events, which were officially declared by Olympic Committee President Jacques Rogge on 4 July 2011, were: Ski slopestyle, Snowboard slopestyle, Snowboard parallel special slalom.

Team alpine skiing was also presented as a candidate for inclusion in the Olympic program but the executive board of the IOC rejected this proposal. The International Ski Federation persisted with the nomination and this was considered. There were reports of bandy possibly being added to the sports program, but the IOC rejected this request. Subsequently, the international governing body, Federation of International Bandy, decided that Irkutsk and Shelekhov in Russia would host the 2014 Bandy World Championship just before the Olympics.

On 28 November 2006, the executive board of the IOC decided not to include ski mountaineering, ski-orienteering, or winter triathlon in the review process of the program.

=== Closing ceremony ===
The closing ceremony was held on 23 February 2014 between 20:14 MSK (UTC+4) and 22:25 MSK (UTC+4) at the Fisht Olympic Stadium in Sochi. The ceremony was dedicated to Russian culture featuring world-renowned Russian stars like conductor and violinist Yuri Bashmet, conductor Valery Gergiev, pianist Denis Matsuev, singer Hibla Gerzmava and violinist Tatiana Samouil. These artists were joined by performers from the Bolshoi and Mariinsky theaters.

== Medals ==
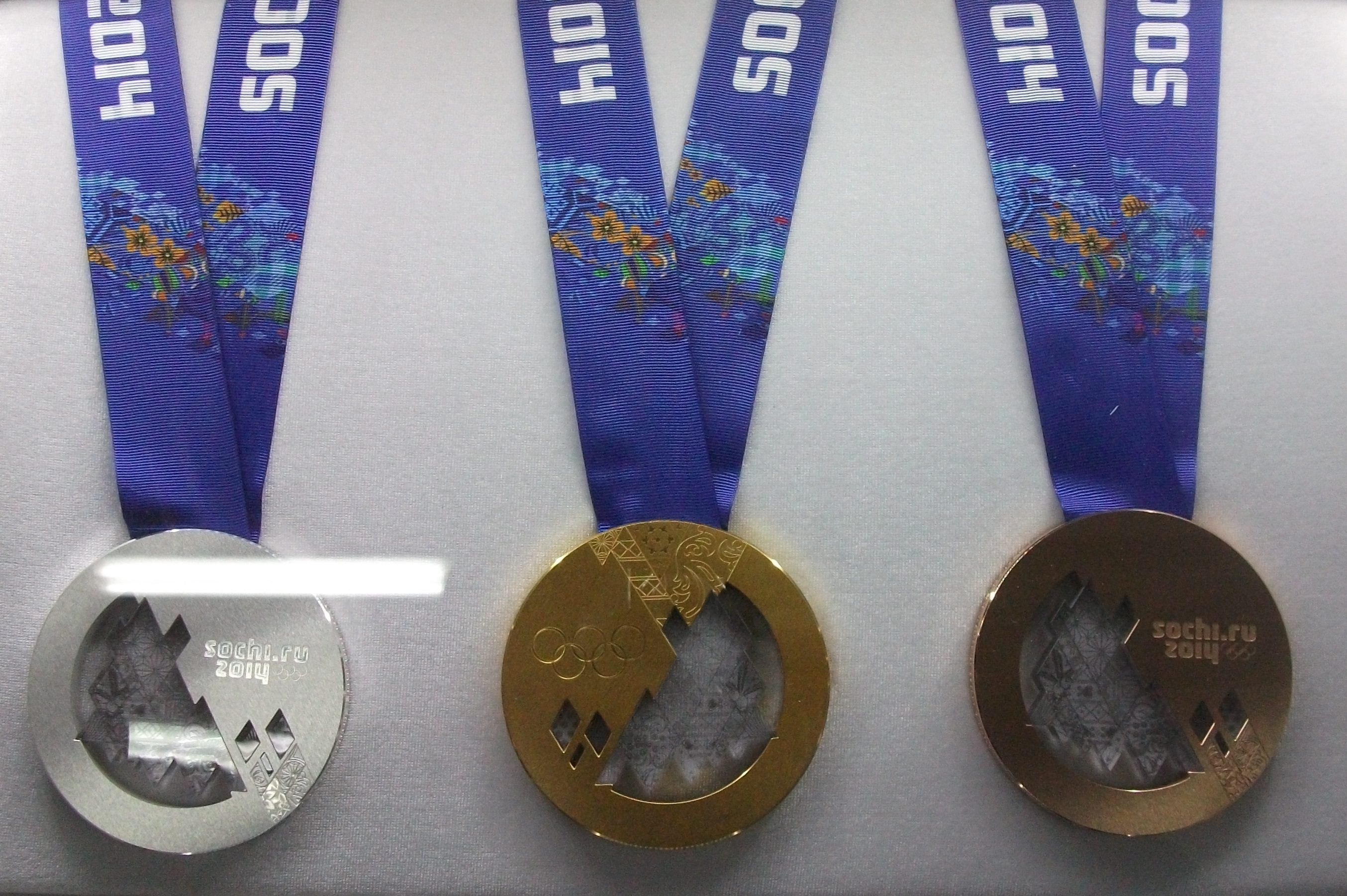
Medals of the 2014 Winter Olympics

Sochi's medal design was unveiled in May 2013. The design is intended to resemble Sochi's landscape, with a semi-translucent section containing a "patchwork quilt" of diamonds representing mountains; the diamonds themselves contain designs that reflect Russia's regions. Those who won gold medals on 15 February received special medals with fragments of the Chelyabinsk meteor, marking the first anniversary of the event where pieces of the cosmic body fell into the Chebarkul Lake in the Ural Mountains in central Russia.

=== Medal table ===
The top ten listed NOCs by number of gold medals are listed below. The host nation, Russia, is highlighted.

‡ = Post-competition changes in medal standings (totals after changes)

* Host nation (Russia)

2014 Winter Olympics medal table
Rank	NOC	Gold	Silver	Bronze	Total
1	Norway	11	6	10	27
2	Russia*‡	10	10	9	29
3	Canada	10	10	5	25
4	United States‡	9	9	10	28
5	Germany	9	5	5	19
6	Netherlands	8	7	9	24
7	Switzerland‡	7	2	2	11
8	Belarus	5	0	1	6
9	Austria	4	9	4	17
10	France	4	4	7	15
11–26	Remaining NOCs	22	35	37	94
Totals (26 entries)		99	97	99	295

=== Podium sweeps ===
Date	Sport	Event	NOC	Gold	Silver	Bronze
8 February	Speed skating	Men's 5000 metres	Netherlands	Sven Kramer	Jan Blokhuijsen	Jorrit Bergsma
10 February	Speed skating	Men's 500 metres	Netherlands	Michel Mulder	Jan Smeekens	Ronald Mulder
13 February	Freestyle skiing	Men's slopestyle	United States	Joss Christensen	Gus Kenworthy	Nick Goepper
16 February	Speed skating	Women's 1500 metres	Netherlands	Jorien ter Mors	Ireen Wüst	Lotte van Beek
18 February	Speed skating	Men's 10000 metres	Netherlands	Jorrit Bergsma	Sven Kramer	Bob de Jong
20 February	Freestyle skiing	Men's ski cross	France	Jean-Frédéric Chapuis	Arnaud Bovolenta	Jonathan Midol
22 February	Cross-country skiing	Women's 30 kilometre freestyle	Norway	Marit Bjørgen	Therese Johaug	Kristin Størmer Steira
23 February	Cross-country skiing	Men's 50 kilometre freestyle	Russia	Alexander Legkov^{[a]}	Maxim Vylegzhanin^{[a]}	Ilia Chernousov

^{a} Legkov and Vylegzhanin were initially disqualified by the IOC for doping offenses in November 2017, and their 2014 Olympic medals (gold and silver respectively) were stripped. However, their results were restored on 1 February 2018 following a successful appeal.

== Calendar ==
In the following calendar each blue box represents one or more event competition(s), such as a qualification round, on that day. The yellow boxes represent medal-awarding finals for a sport with in each box the number of finals that were contested on that day.

All dates are MSK (UTC+4)

OC	Opening ceremony	●	Event competitions	1	Event finals	EG	Exhibition gala	CC	Closing ceremony

February	6th Thu	7th Fri	8th Sat	9th Sun	10th Mon	11th Tue	12th Wed	13th Thu	14th Fri	15th Sat	16th Sun	17th Mon	18th Tue	19th Wed	20th Thu	21st Fri	22nd Sat	23rd Sun	Events
Ceremonies		OC																CC	—N/a
Alpine skiing				1	1		1		1	1	1		1	1		1	1		10
Biathlon			1	1	1	1		1	1			1	1	1		1	1		11
Bobsleigh											●	1	●	1			●	1	3
Cross-country skiing			1	1		2		1	1	1	1			2			1	1	12
Curling					●	●	●	●	●	●	●	●	●	●	1	1			2
Figure skating	●		●	1		●	1	●	1		●	1		●	1		EG		5
Freestyle skiing	●		1		1	1		1	1			1	1		2	1			10
Ice hockey			●	●	●	●	●	●	●	●	●	●	●	●	1	●	●	1	2
Luge			●	1	●	1	1	1											4
Nordic combined							1						1		1				3
Short track speed skating					1			1		2			1			3			8
Skeleton								●	1	1									2
Ski jumping			●	1		1			●	1		1							4
Snowboarding	●		1	1		1	1				1		1	2			2		10
Speed skating			1	1	1	1	1	1		1	1		1	1		●	2		12
Daily medal events			5	8	5	8	6	6	6	7	4	5	7	8	6	7	7	3	98
Cumulative total			5	13	18	26	32	38	44	51	55	60	67	75	81	88	95	98	98
February	6th Thu	7th Fri	8th Sat	9th Sun	10th Mon	11th Tue	12th Wed	13th Thu	14th Fri	15th Sat	16th Sun	17th Mon	18th Tue	19th Wed	20th Thu	21st Fri	22nd Sat	23rd Sun	Total events

== Security ==
=== Measures ===
Security during both the Olympics and Paralympics were handled by over 40,000 law enforcement officials, including police and the Russian Armed Forces. A presidential decree signed by President Vladimir Putin took effect on 7 January, requiring that any protests and demonstrations in Sochi and the surrounding area through 21 March (the end of the Paralympics) be approved by the Federal Security Service. For the duration of the decree, travel restrictions were also in effect in and around Sochi: "controlled" zones, dubbed the "ring of steel" by the media, covered the Coastal and Mountain clusters which encompass all of the Games' venues and infrastructure, including transport hubs such as railway stations. To enter controlled areas, visitors were required to pass through security checkpoints with X-ray machines, metal detectors and explosive material scanners. Several areas were designated as "forbidden", including Sochi National Park and the border with Abkhazia. An unmanned aerial vehicle squadron, along with S-400 and Pantsir-S1 air defense rockets were used to protect Olympic airspace. Four gunboats were also deployed on the Black Sea to protect the coastline.

A number of security organisations and forces began stationing in and around Sochi in January 2014; Russia's Ministry of Emergency Situations (EMERCOM) was stationed in Sochi for the Games beginning on 7 January 2014. A group of 10,000 Internal Troops of the Ministry of Interior also provided security services during the Games. In mid-January, 1,500 Siberian Regional Command troops were stationed in a military town near Krasnaya Polyana. A group of 400 Cossacks in traditional uniforms were also present to accompany police patrols. The 58th Army unit of the Russian Armed Forces were defending the Georgia–Russia border. The United States also supplied Navy ships and other assets for security purposes.

All communication and Internet traffic by Sochi residents was captured and filtered through deep packet inspection systems at all mobile networks using the SORM system.

Former professional speed skater and current deputy of the Russian State Duma Svetlana Zhurova has stated that the 2014 Sochi Olympics were Vladimir Putin's personal project to showcase Russia to the world.

=== Incidents and threats ===
Organisers received several threats prior to the Games. In a July 2013 video release, Chechen Islamist commander Dokka Umarov called for attacks on the Games, stating that the Games were being staged "on the bones of many, many Muslims killed ... and buried on our lands extending to the Red Sea".

Threats were received from the group Vilayat Dagestan, which had claimed responsibility for the Volgograd bombings under the demands of Umarov, and a number of National Olympic Committees had also received threats via e-mail, threatening that terrorists would kidnap or "blow up" athletes during the Games. However, while the IOC did state that the letters "[contained] no threat and appears to be a random message from a member of the public", the U.S. ski and snowboarding teams hired a private security agency to provide additional protection during the Games.

== Media ==
=== Broadcasting rights ===
In most regions, broadcast rights to the 2014 Winter Olympics were packaged together with broadcast rights for the 2016 Summer Olympics, but some broadcasters obtained rights to further games as well. Domestic broadcast rights were sold by Sportfive to a consortium of three Russian broadcasters: Channel One, VGTRK, and NTV Plus.

In the United States, the 2014 Winter Olympics were the first in a new, US$4.38 billion contract with NBCUniversal, extending its broadcast rights to the Olympic Games through 2020.

In Canada, after losing the 2010 and 2012 Games to Bell Media and Rogers Media, the Canadian Broadcasting Corporation re-gained broadcast rights to the Olympics for the first time since 2008, gaining rights to the 2014 and 2016 Games. Bell and Rogers sub-licensed pay-TV rights for their TSN, Sportsnet and Réseau des sports networks, as well as TVA Group's TVA Sports.

In Australia, after all three major commercial networks pulled out of bidding on rights to both the 2014 and 2016 Games due to cost concerns, the IOC awarded broadcast rights to just the 2014 Winter Olympics to Network Ten for A$20 million.

=== Filming ===
Several broadcasters used the Games to trial the emerging ultra high definition television (UHDTV) standard. Both NTV Plus and Comcast filmed portions of the Games in 4K resolution; Comcast offered its content through smart TV apps, while NTV+ held public and cinema viewings of the content. NHK filmed portions of the Games in 8K resolution for public viewing. Olympic sponsor Panasonic filmed the opening ceremony in 4K.

== Concerns and controversies ==
A variety of concerns over the Games, or Russia's hosting of the Games, had been expressed by various entities. Concerns were shown over Russia's policies surrounding the LGBT community, including the government's denial of a proposed Pride House for the Games on moral grounds, and a federal law passed in June 2013 which criminalised the distribution of "propaganda of non-traditional sexual relationships" among minors. Severe cost overruns made the 2014 Winter Olympics the most expensive Olympics in history, with Russian politician Boris Nemtsov citing allegations of corruption among government officials, and Allison Stewart of the Saïd Business School at the University of Oxford citing tight relationships between the government and construction firms. It was reported that Putin's annexation of Crimea may have been intended to distract local Russians from corruption stories related to the Games.

American broadcaster NBC largely avoided broadcasting material critical of Russia, although several segments deemed "overly friendly to Russia" were criticised by some commentators.

Following the closing ceremony, commentators evaluated the Games to have been successful overall.

=== Circassian genocide ===
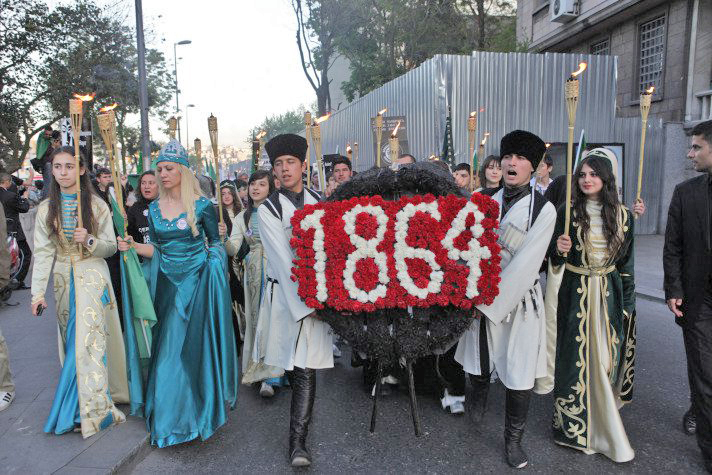
Circassians in Turkey commemorate the Circassian genocide in Taksim, Istanbul

Some Circassian organisations objected to the Games being held on land their ancestors held until 1864, when most of them were displaced at the end of the Russian-Circassian War (1763–1864), in the Circassian genocide. The use of Krasnaya Polyana ("Red Hill" or "Red Glade") as an event site was considered insensitive, as it was named for a group of Circassians who were defeated in a bloody battle with Russians while attempting to return home over it in 1864. Some Circassian groups demanded that the Games be cancelled or moved unless Russia apologised for their actions. Other groups did not outright object to the Games, but suggested that symbols of Circassian history and culture be incorporated into the Games, as Australia, the United States and Canada did for their indigenous cultures in 2000, 2002, and 2010 respectively.

=== Russian doping scandal ===
Following the Games, reports began to emerge that the Russian Olympic team had participated in a state-run doping program, which supplied their athletes with performance-enhancing drugs. These allegations first emerged in a December 2014 documentary by German public broadcaster ARD, and were detailed further in a May 2016 report by The New York Times—which published allegations by Dr. Grigory Rodchenkov, the former director of Russia's anti-doping laboratory. Rodchenkov alleged that a conspiracy of corrupt anti-doping officials, FSB intelligence agents, and compliant Russian athletes used banned substances to gain an unfair advantage during the Games. Rodchenkov stated that the FSB tampered with over 100 urine samples as part of a cover-up, and that at least fifteen of the Russian medals won in Sochi were the result of doping.

The World Anti-Doping Agency (WADA) commissioned an independent report by Richard McLaren, which corroborated claims that Russian authorities had been discreetly swapping out urine samples that tested positive for performance-enhancing substances. The report concluded that the program had been operating from "at least late 2011 to August 2015", and had covered up 643 positive samples across Olympic and non-Olympic sports. As a result, WADA considered the Russian Anti-Doping Agency to be non-compliant with the World Anti-Doping Code, and recommended that Russia be banned from competing in the 2016 Summer Olympics.

Russia was not banned from the 2016 Olympics by the IOC, a decision that was widely criticised by both athletes and writers; the IOC only required Russia's athletes to be cleared by an internal panel and their respective sports federations. The IAAF had suspended Russia from international track and field events due to the scandal, but did allow Darya Klishina to participate in the Olympics because she was confirmed not to be a part of a doping program, despite claims that surfaced in her appeal that a sample of Klishina's that had been collected on 26 February 2014 had yielded an illegal testosterone/epitestosterone ratio of 8.5 had been subject to a "SAVE" order by the Ministry of Sport on 3 March 2014. The International Paralympic Committee suspended the Russian Paralympic Committee and banned the team from the 2016 Summer Paralympics.

On 5 December 2017, the IOC voted to suspend the Russian Olympic Committee, thus banning it from sending athletes under the Russian flag to the 2018 Winter Olympics. Cleared Russian athletes were allowed to participate as "Olympic Athletes from Russia" (OAR). Two of them – curler Alexander Krushelnitskiy, who won a bronze medal, and bobsledder Nadezhda Sergeeva – failed drug tests during the Games.

The IOC's Oswald Commission disqualified and banned 43 Russian athletes, and stripped thirteen medals they earned in Sochi. In December 2017, 42 of the 43 punished athletes appealed to the Court of Arbitration for Sport (CAS). On 1 February 2018, the CAS found that the IOC provided insufficient evidence and cleared 28 athletes from IOC sanctions. In total, Russian athletes won back 9 of the 13 medals collected. For 11 other athletes, the CAS decided that there was sufficient evidence to uphold their Sochi sanctions, but reduced their lifetime bans to only the 2018 Winter Olympics. The IOC said in a statement that "the result of the CAS decision does not mean that athletes from the group of 28 will be invited to the [2018 Winter Olympic] Games. Not being sanctioned does not automatically confer the privilege of an invitation" and that "this [case] may have a serious impact on the future fight against doping". The IOC found it important to note that the CAS Secretary General "insisted that the CAS decision does not mean that these 28 athletes are innocent” and that they would consider an appeal against the court's decision. Later that month, the Russian Olympic Committee was reinstated by the IOC, despite failed doping tests during the 2018 Olympics, and the Russian Anti-Doping Agency was re-certified in September, despite the Russian officials not accepting the McLaren report.

=== Subsequent events ===
Just 4 days after the closing of the Games, Russian troops entered Ukrainian Crimea and started the formal annexation of Crimea by the Russian Federation. Russia formally incorporated Crimea into its territory on 14 March 2014. This marked the second of three times (2008, 2014, and 2022) that Russia under Vladimir Putin invaded a neighbouring country during or immediately after the Olympic games.

== See also ==
- 2014 Winter Paralympics
- Olympic Games held in Russia
  - 1980 Summer Olympics – Moscow
  - 2014 Winter Olympics – Sochi
- List of IOC country codes
- 2014 Summer Youth Olympics

Winter Olympics
Preceded by Vancouver	XXII Olympic Winter Games; Sochi; 2014	Succeeded by Pyeongchang
