= 2011–12 Biathlon World Cup – Pursuit Women =

The 2011–12 Biathlon World Cup – Pursuit Women will start at Sunday December 4, 2011 in Östersund and will finish Sunday March 17, 2012 in Khanty-Mansiysk. Defending titlist is Kaisa Mäkäräinen of Finland.

== Competition format ==
This is a pursuit competition. The biathletes' starts are separated by their time differences from a previous race, most commonly a sprint race. The contestants ski a distance of 10 kilometres (6.2 mi) over five laps. On four of the laps, the contestants shoot at targets; each miss requires the contestant to ski a penalty loop of 150 metres (490 ft). There are two prone shooting bouts and two standing bouts, in that order. The contestant crossing the finish line first is the winner.

To prevent awkward and/or dangerous crowding of the skiing loops, and overcapacity at the shooting range, World Cup Pursuits are held with only the 60 top ranking biathletes after the preceding race. The biathletes shoot (on a first-come, first-served basis) at the lane corresponding to the position they arrived for all shooting bouts.

Points are awarded for each event, according to each contestant's finish. When all events are completed. the contestant with the highest number of points is declared the season winner.

== 2010–11 Top 3 Standings ==
Medal	Athlete	Points
Gold:	(Finland) Kaisa Mäkäräinen	343
Silver:	(Germany) Andrea Henkel	303
Bronze:	(Sweden) Helena Ekholm	279

== Medal winners ==
Event:	Gold:	Time	Silver:	Time	Bronze:	Time
Östersund details	Tora Berger; Norway	33:56.9 (0+0+0+1)	Kaisa Mäkäräinen; Finland	34:30.1 (1+0+0+1)	Magdalena Neuner; Germany	35:21.3 (0+1+2+1)
Hochfilzen details	Darya Domracheva; Belarus	29:34.4 (1+0+1+0)	Olga Zaitseva; Russia	29:34.7 (0+0+0+1)	Magdalena Neuner; Germany	29:37.5 (0+0+0+2)
Hochfilzen (2) details	Olga Zaitseva; Russia	31:52.2 (0+0+0+0)	Helena Ekholm; Sweden	32:21.3 (0+0+0+1)	Darya Domracheva; Belarus	32:36.9 (1+1+0+1)
Nové Město details	Tora Berger; Norway	31:00.3 (0+1+2+0)	Helena Ekholm; Sweden	31:18.2 (0+0+0+0)	Marie Laure Brunet; France	31:25.4 (0+0+0+0)
Holmenkollen details	Magdalena Neuner; Germany	30:31.1 (0+1+1+0)	Olga Zaitseva; Russia	31:07.6 (0+0+0+0)	Darya Domracheva; Belarus	31:22.5 (0+0+2+0)
Kontiolahti details	Kaisa Mäkäräinen; Finland	32:23.0 (0+1+0+0)	Magdalena Neuner; Germany	32:58.9 (0+1+1+2)	Darya Domracheva; Belarus	33:00.0 (2+0+2+0)
Biathlon World Championships 2012 details	Darya Domracheva; Belarus	29:39.6 (0+1+1+0)	Magdalena Neuner; Germany	30:04.7 (0+1+0+2)	Olga Vilukhina; Russia	30:55.0 (0+0+1+0)
Khanty-Mansiysk details	Darya Domracheva; Belarus	32:44.5 (0+1+1+0)	Kaisa Mäkäräinen; Finland	33:09.3 (1+1+0+0)	Vita Semerenko; Ukraine	33:16.6 (0+0+1+1)

== Standings ==
#	Name	ÖST	HOC1	HOC2	NOV	HOL	KON	WCH	KHA	Total
1	Darya Domracheva (BLR)	25	60	48	43	48	48	60	60	392
2	Magdalena Neuner (GER)	48	48	29	36	60	54	54	43	372
3	Tora Berger (NOR)	60	32	43	60	43	40	43	40	361
4	Kaisa Mäkäräinen (FIN)	54	30	40	31	40	60	21	54	330
5	Olga Zaitseva (RUS)	26	54	60	40	54	43	36	—	313
6	Helena Ekholm (SWE)	34	29	54	54	25	29	40	30	295
7	Andrea Henkel (GER)	31	43	38	34	30	34	30	36	276
8	Marie Laure Brunet (FRA)	36	34	27	48	36	14	38	38	271
9	Marie Dorin Habert (FRA)	23	36	34	27	34	26	32	34	246
10	Olga Vilukhina (RUS)	4	38	32	23	38	36	48	—	219
11	Tina Bachmann (GER)	38	27	—	12	31	38	27	27	200
12	Anastasiya Kuzmina (SVK)	32	31	21	13	20	31	22	28	198
13	Vita Semerenko (UKR)	28	—	31	24	—	20	34	48	185
14	Krystyna Pałka (POL)	27	24	28	32	10	18	14	31	184
15	Synnøve Solemdal (NOR)	24	16	26	21	24	27	17	22	177
16	Anna Bogaliy-Titovets (RUS)	30	40	36	8	—	24	18	14	170
17	Svetlana Sleptsova (RUS)	40	23	16	29	—	—	25	24	157
18	Zina Kocher (CAN)	17	18	11	11	12	32	15	29	145
19	Teja Gregorin (SLO)	16	19	0	28	11	28	29	—	131
20	Miriam Gössner (GER)	3	3	13	30	22	21	19	16	127
21	Valj Semerenko (UKR)	43	17	0	22	—	17	0	23	122
22	Natalya Burdyga (UKR)	13	8	5	38	15	19	—	18	116
23	Michela Ponza (ITA)	15	20	22	14	7	12	1	25	116
24	Veronika Vítková (CZE)	—	22	0	20	32	—	23	2	99
25	Elise Ringen (NOR)	29	26	—	10	13	0	20	0	98
26	Weronika Nowakowska-Ziemniak (POL)	1	10	20	26	—	9	24	6	96
27	Selina Gasparin (SUI)	0	11	23	—	19	3	28	9	93
28	Sophie Boilley (FRA)	19	5	25	6	18	16	0	—	89
29	Anais Bescond (FRA)	12	1	0	2	23	25	13	10	86
30	Franziska Hildebrand (GER)	14	—	18	—	29	0	0	19	80
31	Jana Gereková (SVK)	0	6	—	15	1	22	10	26	80
32	Éva Tófalvi (ROU)	21	28	0	18	—	—	—	—	67
33	Mari Laukkanen (FIN)	7	0	9	0	27	0	16	0	59
34	Anna Maria Nilsson (SWE)	0	12	14	0	0	—	31	0	57
35	Liudmila Kalinchik (BLR)	—	0	10	19	5	10	11	1	56
36	Susan Dunklee (USA)	9	0	—	—	6	—	5	32	52
37	Agnieszka Cyl (POL)	22	25	0	—	2	—	3	—	52
38	Bente Landheim (NOR)	0	14	—	16	0	13	9	0	52
39	Andreja Mali (SLO)	5	0	4	0	8	6	7	20	50
40	Yana Romanova (RUS)	—	7	—	—	—	30	—	12	49
41	Magdalena Gwizdoń (POL)	0	—	7	—	14	1	26	—	48
42	Ekaterina Glazyrina (RUS)	—	—	—	25	9	—	—	13	47
43	Kadri Lehtla (EST)	—	—	—	—	21	23	0	—	44
44	Ekaterina Yurlova (RUS)	—	21	19	—	—	—	—	—	40
45	Anna Karin Strömstedt (SWE)	0	—	12	0	26	—	0	0	38
46	Nastassia Dubarezava (BLR)	8	0	8	5	0	7	8	0	36
47	Karin Oberhofer (ITA)	0	4	24	3	—	0	—	—	31
48	Tang Jialin (CHN)	—	—	30	—	—	—	—	—	30
49	Anna Boulygina (RUS)	—	—	—	—	28	—	—	—	28
50	Ekaterina Shumilova (RUS)	—	—	—	17	—	0	—	11	28
51	Olena Pidhrushna (UKR)	18	—	—	9	—	0	—	—	27
52	Nadezhda Skardino (BLR)	0	0	0	0	4	2	12	7	25
53	Sara Studebaker (USA)	2	0	—	0	16	5	0	0	23
54	Anastasia Zagoruiko (RUS)	—	—	—	—	—	15	—	8	23
55	Monika Hojnisz (POL)	10	13	—	—	—	—	—	—	23
56	Tiril Eckhoff (NOR)	—	—	—	—	0	0	—	21	21
57	Fanny Welle-Strand Horn (NOR)	20	—	—	—	0	—	—	—	20
58	Megan Imrie (CAN)	0	—	17	0	0	—	2	0	19
59	Katja Haller (ITA)	—	—	—	0	17	0	0	—	17
60	Marina Korovina (NOR)	—	—	—	—	—	—	—	17	17
61	Olga Poltoranina (KAZ)	—	0	15	1	—	—	—	—	16
62	Maren Hammerschmidt (GER)	—	—	—	—	—	—	—	15	15
62	Carolin Hennecke (GER)	—	15	—	—	—	—	—	—	15
64	Diana Rasimovičiūtė (LTU)	6	—	0	0	—	4	0	5	15
65	Natalia Sorokina (RUS)	11	—	3	—	—	—	—	—	14
66	Laure Soulie (AND)	—	9	0	0	0	0	4	—	13
67	Jenny Jonsson (SWE)	—	—	—	—	—	11	0	—	11
68	Juliya Dzhyma (UKR)	—	—	—	—	—	8	0	3	11
69	Elisabeth Högberg (SWE)	—	—	—	7	—	—	—	—	7
70	Fuyuko Suzuki (JPN)	—	—	0	0	0	0	6	—	6
71	Nadine Horchler (GER)	—	—	6	—	—	—	—	—	6
72	Aleksandra Alikina (RUS)	—	—	—	—	—	—	—	4	4
72	Gabriela Soukalová (CZE)	—	—	—	4	—	—	—	—	4
74	Marine Bolliet (FRA)	—	2	2	—	0	—	—	0	4
75	Emilia Yordanova (BUL)	—	—	—	0	3	—	0	—	3
76	Iryna Kryuko (BLR)	—	—	1	0	0	—	—	0	1
