= 2011–12 Biathlon World Cup – Individual Women =

The 2011–12 Biathlon World Cup – Individual Women began on Thursday December 1, 2011 in the Östersund and finished on Wednesday March 7, 2012 in the Ruhpolding at the Biathlon World Championships 2012 event. The defending titlist was Helena Ekholm of Sweden.

== Competition format ==
The 15 kilometres (9.3 mi) individual race is the oldest biathlon event; the distance is skied over five laps. The biathlete shoots four times at any shooting lane, in the order of prone, standing, prone, standing, totalling 20 targets. For each missed target a fixed penalty time, usually one minute, is added to the skiing time of the biathlete. Competitors' starts are staggered, normally by 30 seconds.

== 2010–11 Top 3 Standings ==
Medal	Athlete	Points
Gold:	(Sweden) Helena Ekholm	173
Silver:	(Ukraine) Valj Semerenko	159
Bronze:	(Russia) Olga Zaitseva	138

== Medal winners ==
Event:	Gold:	Time	Silver:	Time	Bronze:	Time
Östersund details	Darya Domracheva; Belarus	47:15.6 (1+1+0+0)	Anna Maria Nilsson; Sweden	48:24.1 (1+0+0+0)	Magdalena Neuner; Germany	48:57.3 (0+1+0+2)
Nové Město details	Kaisa Mäkäräinen; Finland	45:03.3 (0+1+1+0)	Helena Ekholm; Sweden	45:25.3 (0+0+0+1)	Magdalena Neuner; Germany	45:36.2 (0+1+0+1)
Biathlon World Championships 2012 details	Tora Berger; Norway	42:30.0 (1+0+0+0)	Marie Laure Brunet; France	43:26.4 (0+0+0+1)	Helena Ekholm; Sweden	43:41.1 (1+0+0+0)

== Standings ==
#	Name	ÖST	NOV	WCH	Total
1	Helena Ekholm (SWE)	36	54	48	138
2	Kaisa Mäkäräinen (FIN)	43	60	13	116
3	Darya Domracheva (BLR)	60	40	16	116
4	Magdalena Neuner (GER)	48	48	18	114
5	Tora Berger (NOR)	12	36	60	108
6	Olga Zaitseva (RUS)	27	43	38	108
7	Marie Dorin Habert (FRA)	30	34	43	107
8	Teja Gregorin (SLO)	29	27	30	86
9	Anastasiya Kuzmina (SVK)	34	20	31	85
10	Olena Pidhrushna (UKR)	40	15	27	82
11	Marie Laure Brunet (FRA)	26	0	54	80
12	Anna Maria Nilsson (SWE)	54	24	0	78
13	Olga Vilukhina (RUS)	17	19	34	70
14	Andrea Henkel (GER)	24	25	21	70
15	Franziska Hildebrand (GER)	38	31	—	69
16	Svetlana Sleptsova (RUS)	0	29	36	65
17	Synnøve Solemdal (NOR)	28	32	2	62
18	Natalya Burdyga (UKR)	5	23	29	57
19	Zina Kocher (CAN)	6	26	15	47
20	Vita Semerenko (UKR)	8	14	25	47
21	Michela Ponza (ITA)	11	0	32	43
22	Jenny Jonsson (SWE)	25	18	0	43
23	Susan Dunklee (USA)	0	0	40	40
24	Ekaterina Glazyrina (RUS)	—	38	—	38
25	Jana Gereková (SVK)	10	0	28	38
26	Kadri Lehtla (EST)	—	17	19	36
27	Nadezhda Skardino (BLR)	0	28	7	35
28	Fanny Welle-Strand Horn (NOR)	23	4	8	35
29	Valj Semerenko (UKR)	32	0	0	32
30	Ekaterina Yurlova (RUS)	31	0	—	31
31	Weronika Nowakowska-Ziemniak (POL)	0	11	20	31
32	Éva Tófalvi (ROU)	0	30	0	30
33	Sabrina Buchholz (GER)	18	12	—	30
34	Tina Bachmann (GER)	19	10	0	29
35	Nastassia Dubarezava (BLR)	0	16	12	28
36	Veronika Vítková (CZE)	—	0	26	26
37	Fuyuko Suzuki (JPN)	2	0	23	25
38	Iana Romanova (RUS)	0	—	24	24
39	Anais Bescond (FRA)	0	22	0	22
40	Agnieszka Cyl (POL)	22	—	—	22
40	Elena Khrustaleva (RUS)	—	—	22	22
42	Elise Ringen (NOR)	9	13	0	22
43	Megan Imrie (CAN)	0	21	0	21
44	Krystyna Pałka (POL)	21	0	0	21
45	Emelie Larsson (SWE)	20	—	—	20
46	Sophie Boilley (FRA)	4	2	14	20
47	Magdalena Gwizdon (POL)	0	0	17	17
48	Katja Haller (ITA)	16	0	0	16
49	Romana Schrempf (AUT)	15	0	1	16
50	Jori Mørkve (NOR)	14	—	—	14
51	Laure Bosc (FRA)	13	—	—	13
52	Laure Soulie (AND)	7	5	0	12
53	Megan Heinicke (CAN)	—	—	11	11
54	Reka Ferencz (ROU)	0	0	10	10
55	Anna Bogaliy-Titovets (RUS)	1	9	—	10
56	Iris Waldhuber (AUT)	0	—	9	9
57	Olga Poltoranina (KAZ)	0	8	0	8
58	Karin Oberhofer (ITA)	0	7	—	7
59	Ekaterina Vinogradova (ARM)	0	6	—	6
60	Eveli Saue (EST)	—	—	6	6
61	Miriam Gössner (GER)	0	0	5	5
62	Lanny Barnes (USA)	0	—	4	4
63	Kristel Viigipuu (EST)	3	1	0	4
64	Andreja Mali (SLO)	0	3	0	3
65	Sara Studebaker (USA)	0	0	3	3
