= 2011–12 Biathlon World Cup – Mass start Women =

The 2011–12 Biathlon World Cup – Mass start Women will start at January 8, 2012, in Oberhof and will finish in Khanty-Mansiysk. Defending titlist is Darya Domracheva of Belarus.

== Competition format ==
In the mass start, all biathletes start at the same time and the first across the finish line wins. In this 12.5 kilometres (7.8 mi) competition, the distance is skied over five laps; there are four bouts of shooting (two prone, two standing, in that order) with the first shooting bout being at the lane corresponding to your bib (Bib #10 shoots at lane #10 regardless of position in race.) with rest of the shooting bouts being at the lane in the position they arrived (Arrive at the lane in fifth place, you shoot at lane five.). As in sprint races, competitors must ski one 150 m penalty loop for each miss. Here again, to avoid unwanted congestion, World Cup Mass starts are held with only the 30 top ranking athletes on the start line (half that of the Pursuit as here all contestants start simultaneously).

== 2010–11 Top 3 Standings ==
Medal	Athlete	Points
Silver:	(Belarus) Darya Domracheva	236
Gold:	(Germany) Magdalena Neuner	228
Bronze:	(Norway) Tora Berger	206

== Medal winners ==
Event:	Gold:	Time	Silver:	Time	Bronze:	Time
Oberhof details	Magdalena Neuner; Germany	40:02.2 (1+1+1+0)	Tora Berger; Norway	40:14.7 (1+0+1+0)	Andrea Henkel; Germany	40:34.2 (1+0+0+0)
Antholz-Anterselva details	Darya Domracheva; Belarus	35:03.6 (2+0+0+0)	Anastasiya Kuzmina; Slovakia	35:28.8 (0+0+0+1)	Magdalena Neuner; Germany	35:35.7 (0+0+0+2)
Holmenkollen details	Andrea Henkel; Germany	38:01.2 (1+0+0+0)	Darya Domracheva; Belarus	38:27.8 (1+1+1+1)	Teja Gregorin; Slovenia	38:28.4 (0+0+0+0)
World Championships details	Tora Berger; Norway	35:41.6 (0+1+0+0)	Marie Laure Brunet; France	35:49.7 (0+0+0+1)	Kaisa Mäkäräinen; Finland	35:54.3 (0+0+0+1)
Khanty-Mansiysk details	Darya Domracheva; Belarus	39:01.4 (1+0+0+2)	Tora Berger; Norway	39:11.4 (0+0+0+1)	Kaisa Mäkäräinen; Finland	39:34.0 (2+0+1+1)

== Standings ==
#	Name	OBE	ANT	HOL	WCH	KHA	Total
1	Darya Domracheva (BLR)	36	60	54	40	60	250
2	Tora Berger (NOR)	54	43	30	60	54	241
3	Marie Laure Brunet (FRA)	38	26	40	54	40	198
4	Andrea Henkel (GER)	48	28	60	28	31	195
5	Kaisa Mäkäräinen (FIN)	29	30	32	48	48	187
6	Anastasiya Kuzmina (SVK)	20	54	29	34	43	180
7	Magdalena Neuner (GER)	60	48	—	31	38	176
8	Marie Dorin Habert (FRA)	34	32	34	38	34	172
9	Helena Ekholm (SWE)	40	34	43	26	26	169
10	Vita Semerenko (UKR)	32	38	—	36	30	136
11	Teja Gregorin (SLO)	27	31	48	28	—	134
12	Tina Bachmann (GER)	24	18	28	43	21	134
13	Synnøve Solemdal (NOR)	21	25	36	23	14	119
14	Krystyna Pałka (POL)	14	27	31	16	29	117
15	Svetlana Sleptsova (RUS)	25	40	14	17	20	116
16	Olga Vilukhina (RUS)	23	21	38	22	—	104
17	Olga Zaitseva (RUS)	43	36	23	0	—	102
18	Michela Ponza (ITA)	26	19	24	13	17	99
19	Elise Ringen (NOR)	13	13	19	19	25	89
20	Franziska Hildebrand (GER)	15	16	26	—	27	84
21	Veronika Vítková (CZE)	—	—	27	27	24	78
22	Anna Bogaliy-Titovets (RUS)	30	15	—	—	28	73
23	Valj Semerenko (UKR)	28	22	—	—	23	73
24	Weronika Nowakowska-Ziemniak (POL)	—	24	—	32	15	71
25	Natalya Burdyga (UKR)	16	17	20	—	18	71
26	Zina Kocher (CAN)	—	—	12	18	32	61
27	Ekaterina Yurlova (RUS)	18	23	18	—	—	59
28	Jana Gerekova (SVK)	—	—	—	30	22	52
29	Susan Dunklee (USA)	—	14	—	25	13	52
30	Olena Pidhrushna (UKR)	19	29	—	—	—	48
31	Nastassia Dubarezava (BLR)	31	—	15	—	—	46
32	Miriam Gössner (GER)	—	11	21	—	12	44
33	Anna Maria Nilsson (SWE)	22	—	—	21	—	43
34	Tiril Eckhoff (NOR)	—	—	—	—	36	36
35	Selina Gasparin (SUI)	—	—	17	15	—	32
36	Mari Laukkanen (FIN)	—	—	16	14	—	30
37	Diana Rasimovičiūtė (LTU)	12	—	—	—	16	28
38	Anna Boulygina (RUS)	—	—	25	—	—	25
39	Anaïs Bescond (FRA)	—	—	—	24	—	24
40	Sophie Boilley (FRA)	—	—	22	—	—	22
41	Fuyuko Suzuki (JPN)	—	—	—	20	—	20
41	Nadezhda Skardino (BLR)	—	20	—	—	—	20
43	Ekaterina Glazyrina (RUS)	—	—	—	—	19	19
44	Marine Bolliet (FRA)	17	—	—	—	—	17
45	Éva Tófalvi (ROU)	—	—	13	—	—	13
46	Magdalena Gwizdon (POL)	—	—	—	12	—	12
46	Katja Haller (SUI)	—	12	—	—	—	12
48	Andreja Mali (SLO)	—	—	—	—	11	11
48	Fanny Welle-Strand Horn (NOR)	11	—	—	—	—	11
