= 2011–12 Biathlon World Cup – Pursuit Men =

The 2011–12 Biathlon World Cup – Pursuit Men will start at Sunday December 4, 2011 in Östersund and will finish Sunday March 17, 2012 in Khanty-Mansiysk. Defending titlist is Tarjei Bø of Norway.

== Competition format ==
This is a pursuit competition. The biathletes' starts are separated by their time differences from a previous race, most commonly a sprint race. The contestants ski a distance of 12.5 kilometres (7.8 mi) over five laps. On four of the laps, the contestants shoot at targets; each miss requires the contestant to ski a penalty loop of 150 metres (490 ft). There are two prone shooting bouts and two standing bouts, in that order. The contestant crossing the finish line first is the winner.

To prevent awkward and/or dangerous crowding of the skiing loops, and overcapacity at the shooting range, World Cup Pursuits are held with only the 60 top ranking biathletes after the preceding race. The biathletes shoot (on a first-come, first-served basis) at the lane corresponding to the position they arrived for all shooting bouts.

Points are awarded for each event, according to each contestant's finish. When all events are completed. the contestant with the highest number of points is declared the season winner.

== 2010-11 Top 3 Standings ==
Medal	Athlete	Points
Gold:	(Norway) Tarjei Bø	334
Silver:	(France) Martin Fourcade	320
Bronze:	(Norway) Emil Hegle Svendsen	304

== Medal winners ==
Event:	Gold:	Time	Silver:	Time	Bronze:	Time
Östersund details	Martin Fourcade; France	32:56.0 (0+0+0+0)	Emil Hegle Svendsen; Norway	33:21.5 (0+0+1+1)	Jaroslav Soukup; Czech Republic	33:22.9 (0+1+0+0)
Hochfilzen details	Emil Hegle Svendsen; Norway	33:09.0 (1+0+1+0)	Tarjei Bø; Norway	33:09.1 (0+0+1+0)	Benjamin Weger; Switzerland	33:13.9 (1+0+0+0)
Hochfilzen (2) details	Andreas Birnbacher; Germany	35:40.3 (0+0+0+0)	Ole Einar Bjørndalen; Norway	35:40.5 (0+0+0+0)	Simon Fourcade; France	35:41.6 (1+0+0+0)
Nové Město details	Anton Shipulin; Russia	34:50.8 (0+0+1+0)	Martin Fourcade; France	35:01.9 (1+0+1+1)		
Nové Město details	Anton Shipulin; Russia	34:50.8 (0+0+1+0)	Arnd Peiffer; Germany	35:01.9 (1+0+1+1)		
Holmenkollen details	Arnd Peiffer; Germany	31:44.0 (0+0+0+0)	Emil Hegle Svendsen; Norway	32:15.2 (0+1+0+1)	Evgeniy Garanichev; Russia	32:20.3 (0+0+1+1)
Kontiolahti details	Ole Einar Bjørndalen; Norway	33:43.8 (2+0+0+0)	Martin Fourcade; France	33:57.6 (0+1+0+2)	Dmitry Malyshko; Russia	34:06.5 (1+0+1+0)
Biathlon World Championships 2012 details	Martin Fourcade; France	33:39.4 (1+1+0+2)	Carl Johan Bergman; Sweden	33:44.6 (0+1+1+0)	Anton Shipulin; Russia	34:01.5 (1+0+0+0)
Khanty-Mansiysk details	Martin Fourcade; France	34:47.1 (0+0+1+0)	Arnd Peiffer; Germany	35:06.7 (0+0+0+1)	Emil Hegle Svendsen; Norway	35:21.8 (1+1+0+0)

== Standings ==
#	Name	ÖST	HOC1	HOC2	NOV	HOL	KON	WCH	KHA	Total
1	Martin Fourcade (FRA)	60	17	36	54	43	54	60	60	384
2	Emil Hegle Svendsen (NOR)	54	60	17	32	54	43	40	48	348
3	Arnd Peiffer (GER)	19	32	14	54	60	—	24	54	257
4	Tarjei Bø (NOR)	43	54	43	20	21	—	36	40	257
5	Ole Einar Bjørndalen (NOR)	14	40	54	26	31	60	14	—	239
6	Andreas Birnbacher (GER)	38	26	60	29	30	—	29	27	239
7	Benjamin Weger (SUI)	36	48	40	18	27	36	25	—	230
8	Carl Johan Bergman (SWE)	40	43	—	34	22	—	54	34	227
9	Anton Shipulin (RUS)	18	36	—	60	—	34	48	28	224
10	Simon Fourcade (FRA)	12	6	48	43	23	31	38	—	201
11	Lowell Bailey (USA)	28	24	16	23	29	29	21	15	185
12	Andrei Makoveev (RUS)	13	30	28	31	—	28	22	25	177
13	Evgeniy Garanichev (RUS)	—	9	—	36	48	40	27	16	176
14	Björn Ferry (SWE)	27	31	24	24	—	12	30	26	174
15	Dmitry Malyshko (RUS)	—	20	2	40	19	48	—	43	172
16	Evgeny Ustyugov (RUS)	24	27	30	28	36	—	—	17	162
17	Tim Burke (USA)	32	0	—	25	38	30	13	20	158
18	Jakov Fak (SLO)	20	19	0	11	40	—	34	30	154
19	Michal Šlesingr (CZE)	29	13	—	9	32	17	12	38	150
20	Fredrik Lindström (SWE)	26	4	0	38	—	6	31	31	136
21	Simon Schempp (GER)	30	25	19	13	13	—	32	—	132
22	Florian Graf (GER)	15	34	23	4	34	—	3	14	126
23	Lukas Hofer (ITA)	25	21	0	15	—	32	28	5	126
24	Dominik Landertinger (AUT)	0	18	20	—	24	—	10	36	108
25	Jay Hakkinen (USA)	17	0	32	14	16	27	—	1	107
26	Jaroslav Soukup (CZE)	48	0	22	10	—	—	20	0	100
27	Christoph Sumann (AUT)	23	14	21	—	1	38	0	—	97
28	Daniel Mesotitsch (AUT)	0	38	0	—	11	—	43	—	92
29	Simon Hallenbarter (SUI)	7	7	15	—	20	10	0	32	91
30	Ondřej Moravec (CZE)	16	0	—	19	0	7	26	22	90
31	Alexis Bœuf (FRA)	0	28	13	22	0	—	23	—	86
32	Jean-Guillaume Béatrix (FRA)	—	—	29	0	17	16	0	23	85
33	Markus Windisch (ITA)	0	11	—	7	25	21	11	10	85
34	Timofey Lapshin (RUS)	—	23	25	—	7	26	—	0	81
35	Michael Greis (GER)	31	22	0	—	—	—	18	0	71
36	Serhiy Semenov (UKR)	3	15	0	—	—	23	0	29	70
37	Simon Eder (AUT)	22	0	38	—	—	—	7	—	67
38	Brendan Green (CAN)	9	8	1	21	28	—	—	—	67
39	Jean Philippe Leguellec (CAN)	—	—	34	0	15	—	15	0	64
40	Alexey Volkov (RUS)	—	—	31	30	—	—	—	—	61
41	Klemen Bauer (SLO)	—	—	0	—	14	22	9	18	61
42	Lars Berger (NOR)	34	10	9	0	0	—	1	—	54
43	Matej Kazar (SVK)	—	—	—	—	—	24	17	11	52
44	Krasimir Anev (BUL)	0	12	11	—	—	—	—	24	47
45	Andriy Deryzemlya (UKR)	5	—	—	—	—	—	19	21	45
46	Vincent Jay (FRA)	0	—	18	17	10	—	—	—	45
47	Rune Brattsveen (NOR)	11	0	—	—	18	15	—	—	44
48	Daniel Böhm (GER)	—	—	—	8	—	25	—	7	40
49	Christian De Lorenzi (ITA)	0	—	—	—	26	0	4	6	36
50	Daniel Graf (GER)	21	—	—	—	14	—	—	—	35
51	Ivan Joller (SUI)	—	3	26	—	5	—	0	—	34
52	Erik Lesser (GER)	—	—	—	12	—	19	—	—	31
53	Magnús Jónsson (SWE)	0	0	—	27	3	0	—	—	30
54	Michail Kletcherov (BUL)	2	16	12	—	0	—	—	0	30
55	Michael Rösch (GER)	—	29	—	—	—	—	—	—	29
56	Olexander Bilanenko (UKR)	—	0	27	—	0	—	—	—	27
57	Russell Currier (USA)	—	—	—	6	—	18	—	0	24
58	Jarkko Kauppinen (FIN)	—	—	—	2	—	20	—	—	22
59	Sergey Novikov (BLR)	—	—	—	—	6	0	16	—	22
60	Vladimir Iliev (BUL)	—	—	0	—	—	—	—	19	19
61	Serguei Sednev (UKR)	—	0	—	16	—	1	—	—	17
62	Indrek Tobreluts (EST)	—	—	0	3	—	13	—	0	16
63	Scott Perras (CAN)	—	—	—	0	8	—	0	8	16
64	Alexander Os (NOR)	—	—	—	—	—	14	—	0	14
65	Lars Helge Birkeland (NOR)	10	—	—	—	4	—	—	—	14
66	Benedikt Doll (GER)	—	—	—	—	—	—	—	13	13
67	Henrik L'Abée-Lund (NOR)	—	—	—	—	—	—	—	12	12
68	Janez Maric (SLO)	—	—	—	—	—	11	0	—	11
69	Martin Eng (NOR)	—	—	10	—	—	—	—	—	10
70	Aliaksandr Babchyn (BLR)	—	—	—	—	—	9	—	—	9
71	Friedrich Pinter (AUT)	0	—	0	—	—	—	—	9	9
72	Maksim Burtasov (RUS)	—	—	—	—	9	—	—	—	9
73	Zdeněk Vítek (CZE)	0	5	4	0	—	—	—	0	9
74	Andrejs Rastorgujevs (LAT)	8	—	—	—	—	0	—	0	8
75	Junji Nagai (JPN)	0	—	—	—	0	—	8	—	8
76	Pavol Hurajt (SVK)	—	—	—	0	—	—	—	8	8
77	Yuryi Liadov (BLR)	—	—	—	—	—	8	—	—	8
78	Leif Nordgren (USA)	—	—	8	—	—	—	—	—	8
79	Tomasz Sikora (POL)	—	0	7	—	—	—	0	0	7
80	Artem Pryma (UKR)	—	—	—	5	—	—	0	2	7
81	Roman Pryma (UKR)	0	—	—	—	2	5	—	—	7
82	Sven Grossegger (AUT)	6	—	0	0	—	—	—	—	6
83	Dušan Šimočko (SVK)	0	—	0	—	—	—	6	—	6
84	Tomas Holubec (CZE)	—	—	6	—	—	—	—	—	6
85	Lois Habert (FRA)	0	—	5	1	—	—	—	—	6
86	Yan Savitskiy (KAZ)	—	—	—	0	—	—	5	—	5
87	Dominik Windisch (ITA)	—	—	—	—	—	4	—	—	4
88	Evgeny Abramenko (BLR)	4	0	—	—	0	0	—	0	4
89	Roland Lessing (EST)	—	2	—	—	—	0	2	—	4
90	Nathan Smith (CAN)	—	—	—	—	—	—	0	3	3
91	Rene Laurent Vuillermoz (ITA)	—	—	—	—	—	3	—	—	3
92	Vladimir Alenishko (BLR)	—	—	3	0	—	—	—	—	3
93	Timo Antila (FIN)	—	—	—	—	—	2	—	—	2
94	Alexsandr Chervyhkov (KAZ)	1	1	—	—	—	—	—	—	2
