= 2011–12 Biathlon World Cup – Mass start Men =

The 2011–12 Biathlon World Cup – Mass start Men will start at January 8, 2012 in Oberhof. Defending titlist is Emil Hegle Svendsen of Norway.

== Competition format ==
In the mass start, all biathletes start at the same time and the first across the finish line wins. In this 15.0 kilometres (9.3 mi) competition, the distance is skied over five laps; there are four bouts of shooting (two prone, two standing, in that order) with the first shooting bout being at the lane corresponding to your bib (Bib #10 shoots at lane #10 regardless of position in race.) with rest of the shooting bouts being at the lane in the position they arrived (Arrive at the lane in fifth place, you shoot at lane five.). As in sprint races, competitors must ski one 150 m penalty loop for each miss. Here again, to avoid unwanted congestion, World Cup Mass starts are held with only the 30 top ranking athletes on the start line (half that of the Pursuit as here all contestants start simultaneously).

== 2010–11 Top 3 Standings ==
Medal	Athlete	Points
Gold:	(Norway) Emil Hegle Svendsen	244
Silver:	(France) Martin Fourcade	230
Bronze:	(Norway) Tarjei Bø	211

== Medal winners ==
Event:	Gold:	Time	Silver:	Time	Bronze:	Time
Oberhof details	Andreas Birnbacher; Germany	38:34.6 (0+0+0+0)	Simon Fourcade; France	38:38.9 (0+1+0+0)	Emil Hegle Svendsen; Norway	39:04.2 (0+1+2+0)
Antholz-Anterselva details	Andreas Birnbacher; Germany	38:45.7 (0+0+1+0)	Anton Shipulin; Russia	38:45.8 (0+0+1+0)	Martin Fourcade; France	38:46.0 (0+0+0+1)
Holmenkollen details	Emil Hegle Svendsen; Norway	40:44.1 (0+1+1+0)	Andreas Birnbacher; Germany	40:50.4 (0+0+0+0)	Evgeniy Garanichev; Russia	41:01.9 (0+0+1+1)
World Championships details	Martin Fourcade; France	38:25.4 (0+1+1+0)	Björn Ferry; Sweden	38:38.4 (0+0+0+0)	Fredrik Lindström; Sweden	38:28.8 (0+1+1+0)
Khanty-Mansiysk details	Emil Hegle Svendsen; Norway	40:44.1 (0+1+0+1)	Arnd Peiffer; Germany	40:50.4 (1+1+1+1)	Anton Shipulin; Russia	41:01.9 (0+0+2+0)

== Standings ==
#	Name	OBE	ANT	HOL	WCH	KHA	Total
1	Andreas Birnbacher (GER)	60	60	54	43	43	260
2	Emil Hegle Svendsen (NOR)	48	27	60	23	60	218
3	Martin Fourcade (FRA)	28	48	40	60	26	202
4	Fredrik Lindström (SWE)	40	43	14	48	30	175
5	Anton Shipulin (RUS)	32	54	26	12	48	172
6	Simon Fourcade (FRA)	54	29	22	40	14	159
7	Dimitry Malyshko (RUS)	23	38	43	—	38	142
8	Arnd Peiffer (GER)	36	14	—	36	54	140
9	Carl Johan Bergman (SWE)	31	24	18	38	29	140
10	Evgeniy Garanichev (RUS)	—	25	48	32	31	136
11	Michal Šlesingr (CZE)	19	40	20	29	28	136
12	Björn Ferry (SWE)	27	23	—	54	23	127
13	Evgeny Ustyugov (RUS)	17	22	38	31	16	124
14	Jaroslav Soukup (CZE)	22	36	17	30	12	117
15	Alexis Bœuf (FRA)	38	34	15	26	0	113
16	Jakov Fak (SLO)	43	32	36	—	—	111
17	Ole Einar Bjørndalen (NOR)	—	31	24	34	21	110
18	Florian Graf (GER)	18	26	23	—	40	107
19	Daniel Mesotitsch (AUT)	34	16	12	27	18	107
20	Tarjei Bø (NOR)	—	19	32	24	32	107
21	Lowell Bailey (USA)	25	20	27	16	17	105
22	Tim Burke (USA)	—	21	34	18	19	92
23	Lukas Hofer (ITA)	13	11	—	25	36	85
24	Andrei Makoveev (RUS)	29	18	—	13	22	82
25	Benjamin Weger (SUI)	16	30	30	0	—	76
26	Timofey Lapshin (RUS)	26	—	—	—	34	60
27	Simon Schempp (GER)	20	—	25	15	—	60
28	Ondřej Moravec (CZE)	—	—	—	28	27	55
29	Simon Hallenbarter (SUI)	—	13	16	—	25	54
30	Klemen Bauer (SLO)	21	—	—	20	13	54
31	Jean-Guillaume Béatrix (FRA)	—	15	19	—	15	49
32	Alexey Volkov (RUS)	—	17	28	—	—	45
33	Andriy Deryzemlya (UKR)	—	—	—	22	20	42
34	Markus Windisch (ITA)	—	—	11	21	—	32
35	Brendan Green (CAN)	—	—	31	—	—	31
36	Michael Rösch (GER)	30	—	—	—	—	30
37	Jean-Philippe Leguellec (CAN)	—	—	29	—	—	29
38	Michail Kletcherov (BUL)	—	28	—	—	—	28
39	Lars Berger (NOR)	24	—	—	—	—	24
39	Serhiy Semenov (UKR)	—	—	—	—	24	24
41	Krasimir Anev (BUL)	12	12	—	—	—	24
42	Christian De Lorenzi (ITA)	—	—	21	—	—	21
43	Michael Greis (GER)	—	—	—	19	—	19
44	Dominik Landertinger (AUT)	—	—	—	17	—	17
45	Christoph Sumann (AUT)	15	—	—	—	—	15
46	Sergey Novikov (BLR)	—	—	—	14	—	14
47	Artem Pryma (UKR)	14	—	—	—	—	14
48	Rune Brattsveen (NOR)	—	—	13	—	—	13
49	Simon Eder (AUT)	11	—	—	—	—	11
