= 2011–12 Biathlon World Cup – Mixed relay =

The 2011–12 Biathlon World Cup – Mixed Relay will start at Sunday December 18, 2011 in Hochfilzen and will finish Thursday March 1, 2012 in Ruhfolding at Biathlon World Championships 2012 event.

== Competition format ==
The relay teams consist of four biathletes. Legs 1 and 2 are done by the women, legs 3 and 4 by the men. The women's legs are 6 km and men's legs are 7.5 km., Every athlete leg skied over three laps, with two shooting rounds; one prone, one standing. For every round of five targets there are eight bullets available, though the last three can only be single-loaded manually one at a time from spare round holders or bullets deposited by the competitor into trays or onto the mat at the firing line. If after eight bullets there are still misses, one 150 m penalty loop must be taken for each missed target remaining. The first-leg participants start all at the same time, and as in cross-country skiing relays, every athlete of a team must touch the team's next-leg participant to perform a valid changeover. On the first shooting stage of the first leg, the participant must shoot in the lane corresponding to their bib number (Bib #10 shoots at lane #10 regardless of position in race.), then for the remainder of the relay, the relay team shoots at the lane in the position they arrived (Arrive at the range in 5th place, you shoot at lane five.).

== Medal winners ==
Event:	Gold:	Time	Silver:	Time	Bronze:	Time
Hochfilzen details	Russia; Olga Vilukhina; Olga Zaitseva; Alexey Volkov; Anton Shipulin	1:13:33.4 (0+0) (0+3) (0+2) (0+0) (0+0) (0+0) (0+0) (0+0)	Czech Republic; Veronika Vítková; Gabriela Soukalová; Ondřej Moravec; Michal Šlesingr	1:14:00.4 (0+1) (0+2) (0+0) (0+0) (0+1) (0+0) (0+0) (0+1)	France; Marie Dorin Habert; Sophie Boilley; Alexis Bœuf; Simon Fourcade	1:14:11.9 (0+0) (0+2) (0+2) (0+2) (0+0) (0+1) (0+2) (0+0)
Kontiolahti details	France; Sophie Boilley; Anais Bescond; Jean-Guillaume Béatrix; Vincent Jay	1:26:22.9 (0+0) (0+0) (0+3) (0+2) (0+0) (0+0) (0+0) (0+0)	Ukraine; Natalya Burdyga; Olena Pidhrushna; Andriy Deryzemlya; Serguei Sednev	1:26:23.9 (0+0) (0+0) (0+0) (0+0) (0+0) (0+2) (0+1) (0+1)	Slovakia; Jana Gerekova; Anastasiya Kuzmina; Matej Kazar; Miroslav Matiaško	1:27:06.5 (0+1) (0+3) (0+1) (0+2) (0+0) (0+0) (0+0) (0+1)
World Championships 2012 details	Norway; Tora Berger; Synnøve Solemdal; Ole Einar Bjørndalen; Emil Hegle Svendsen	1:12:29.3 (0+0) (0+0) (0+1) (0+3) (0+2) (1+3) (0+0) (0+2)	Slovenia; Andreja Mali; Teja Gregorin; Klemen Bauer; Jakov Fak	1:12:49.5 (0+1) (0+0) (0+1) (0+0) (0+3) (0+2) (0+0) (0+0)	Germany; Andrea Henkel; Magdalena Neuner; Andreas Birnbacher; Arnd Peiffer	1:13:02.1 (0+2) (0+1) (0+1) (0+2) (0+0) (0+0) (0+1) (1+3)

== Standings ==
#	Name	HOC	KON	WCH	Total
1	Russia	60	43	40	143
2	France	48	60	30	138
3	Germany	40	40	48	128
4	Ukraine	34	54	27	115
5	Sweden	43	28	43	114
6	Slovakia	29	48	36	113
7	Czech Republic	54	24	34	112
8	Belarus	31	34	38	103
9	Italy	36	31	32	99
10	United States	27	38	29	94
11	Norway	—	27	60	87
12	Poland	32	26	28	86
13	Finland	23	36	25	84
14	Slovenia	28	—	54	82
15	Bulgaria	30	29	19	78
16	Estonia	19	32	26	77
17	Japan	21	30	24	75
18	Canada	38	—	23	61
19	Lithuania	20	23	16	59
20	Switzerland	25	—	31	56
21	China	16	25	15	56
22	Austria	26	—	20	46
23	Kazakhstan	24	—	21	45
24	Romania	22	—	22	44
25	United Kingdom	18	—	17	35
25	Latvia	17	—	18	17
27	South Korea	15	—	0	15
