= 2011–12 Biathlon World Cup – Individual Men =

The 2011–12 Biathlon World Cup – Individual Men will start at Wednesday November 30, 2011 in Östersund and will finish Tuesday March 6, 2012 in Ruhpolding at Biathlon World Championships 2012 event. Defending titlist is Emil Hegle Svendsen of Norway.

== Competition format ==
The 20 kilometres (12 mi) individual race is the oldest biathlon event; the distance is skied over five laps. The biathlete shoots four times at any shooting lane, in the order of prone, standing, prone, standing, totalling 20 targets. For each missed target a fixed penalty time, usually one minute, is added to the skiing time of the biathlete. Competitors' starts are staggered, normally by 30 seconds.

== 2010-11 Top 3 Standings ==
Medal	Athlete	Points
Gold:	(Norway) Emil Hegle Svendsen	188
Silver:	(Norway) Tarjei Bø	172
Bronze:	(France) Martin Fourcade	133

== Medal winners ==
Event:	Gold:	Time	Silver:	Time	Bronze:	Time
Östersund details	Martin Fourcade; France	53:29.8 (0+0+0+1)	Michal Šlesingr; Czech Republic	55:24.1 (0+1+0+0)	Simon Schempp; Germany	55:24.3 (1+0+0+0)
Nové Město details	Andrei Makoveev; Russia	47:19.0 (0+0+0+0)	Emil Hegle Svendsen; Norway	48:18.7 (1+0+0+1)	Björn Ferry; Sweden	48:33.8 (0+0+0+1)
Biathlon World Championships 2012 details	Jakov Fak; Slovenia	46:48.2 (0+0+0+1)	Simon Fourcade; France	46:55.2 (0+0+1+0)	Jaroslav Soukup; Czech Republic	47:00.5 (0+1+0+0)

== Standings ==
#	Name	ÖST	NOV	WCH	Total
1	Simon Fourcade (FRA)	28	43	54	125
2	Jakov Fak (SLO)	34	19	60	113
3	Emil Hegle Svendsen (NOR)	20	54	34	108
4	Martin Fourcade (FRA)	60	31	16	107
5	Jaroslav Soukup (CZE)	24	27	48	99
6	Daniel Mesotitsch (AUT)	29	40	28	97
7	Michal Šlesingr (CZE)	54	0	38	92
8	Andreas Birnbacher (GER)	13	34	43	90
9	Dominik Landertinger (AUT)	43	13	26	82
10	Simon Eder (AUT)	26	38	18	82
11	Andrei Makoveev (RUS)	21	60	—	81
12	Arnd Peiffer (GER)	1	32	36	69
13	Fredrik Lindström (SWE)	15	23	31	69
14	Tarjei Bø (NOR)	16	28	23	67
15	Alexey Volkov (RUS)	30	15	20	65
16	Simon Schempp (GER)	48	11	0	59
17	Jean-Philippe Leguellec (CAN)	27	24	0	51
18	Ondřej Moravec (CZE)	0	21	29	50
19	Evgeniy Garanichev (RUS)	31	18	—	49
20	Krasimir Anev (BUL)	2	25	22	49
21	Björn Ferry (SWE)	0	48	0	48
22	Rune Brattsveen (NOR)	36	7	0	43
23	Markus Windisch (ITA)	7	16	19	42
24	Evgeny Ustyugov (RUS)	40	—	0	40
25	Klemen Bauer (SLO)	0	0	40	40
26	Anton Shipulin (RUS)	11	29	—	40
27	Michael Greis (GER)	9	—	30	39
28	Christoph Sumann (AUT)	38	0	0	38
29	Vincent Jay (FRA)	0	26	12	38
30	Florian Graf (GER)	0	36	—	36
31	Lowell Bailey (USA)	32	0	3	35
32	Jay Hakkinen (USA)	23	0	10	33
33	Sergey Novikov (BLR)	0	0	32	32
34	Carl Johan Bergman (SWE)	22	9	—	31
35	Lukas Hofer (ITA)	10	—	21	31
36	Artem Pryma (UKR)	0	14	17	31
37	Jean-Guillaume Béatrix (FRA)	—	30	—	30
38	Timofey Lapshin (RUS)	—	0	27	27
39	Tomáš Holubec (CZE)	18	0	8	26
40	Alexis Bœuf (FRA)	25	0	0	25
41	Vladimir Iliev (BUL)	0	0	25	25
42	Andriy Deryzemlya (UKR)	0	0	24	24
43	Brendan Green (CAN)	0	22	—	22
44	Tomasz Sikora (POL)	17	0	4	21
45	Yan Savitskiy (KAZ)	0	8	13	21
46	Olexander Bilanenko (UKR)	—	20	0	20
47	Roland Lessing (EST)	8	12	0	20
48	Serguei Sednev (UKR)	19	—	—	19
49	Daniel Böhm (GER)	—	17	—	17
50	Kauri Koiv (EST)	0	—	15	15
51	Michail Kletcherov (BUL)	0	0	14	14
52	Andrejs Rastorgujevs (LAT)	14	—	0	14
53	Christian De Lorenzi (ITA)	0	4	9	13
54	Benjamin Weger (SUI)	12	0	0	12
55	Hidenori Isa (JPN)	—	0	11	11
56	Simon Hallenbarter (SUI)	6	0	5	11
57	Indrek Tobreluts (EST)	0	10	0	10
58	Dimitry Malyshko (RUS)	—	2	6	8
59	Janez Maric (SLO)	0	0	7	7
60	Sven Grossegger (AUT)	0	6	—	6
61	Lois Habert (FRA)	0	5	—	5
62	Vasja Rupnik (SLO)	5	0	—	5
63	Florent Claude (FRA)	4	0	—	4
64	Vladimir Alenishko (BLR)	0	3	0	3
65	Junji Nagai (JPN)	3	0	0	3
66	Lars Elge Birkeland (NOR)	0	—	2	2
67	Matej Kazar (SVK)	0	0	1	1
68	Sergey Naumik (KAZ)	—	1	0	1
