= 2011–12 Biathlon World Cup =

Biathlon competition

Discipline	Men	Women
Overall	(France) Martin Fourcade	(Germany) Magdalena Neuner
Nations Cup	Russia	Russia
Individual	(France) Simon Fourcade	(Sweden) Helena Ekholm
Sprint	(France) Martin Fourcade	(Germany) Magdalena Neuner
Pursuit	(France) Martin Fourcade	(Belarus) Darya Domracheva
Mass start	(Germany) Andreas Birnbacher	(Belarus) Darya Domracheva
Relay	France	France
- Mixed: Russia

Competition

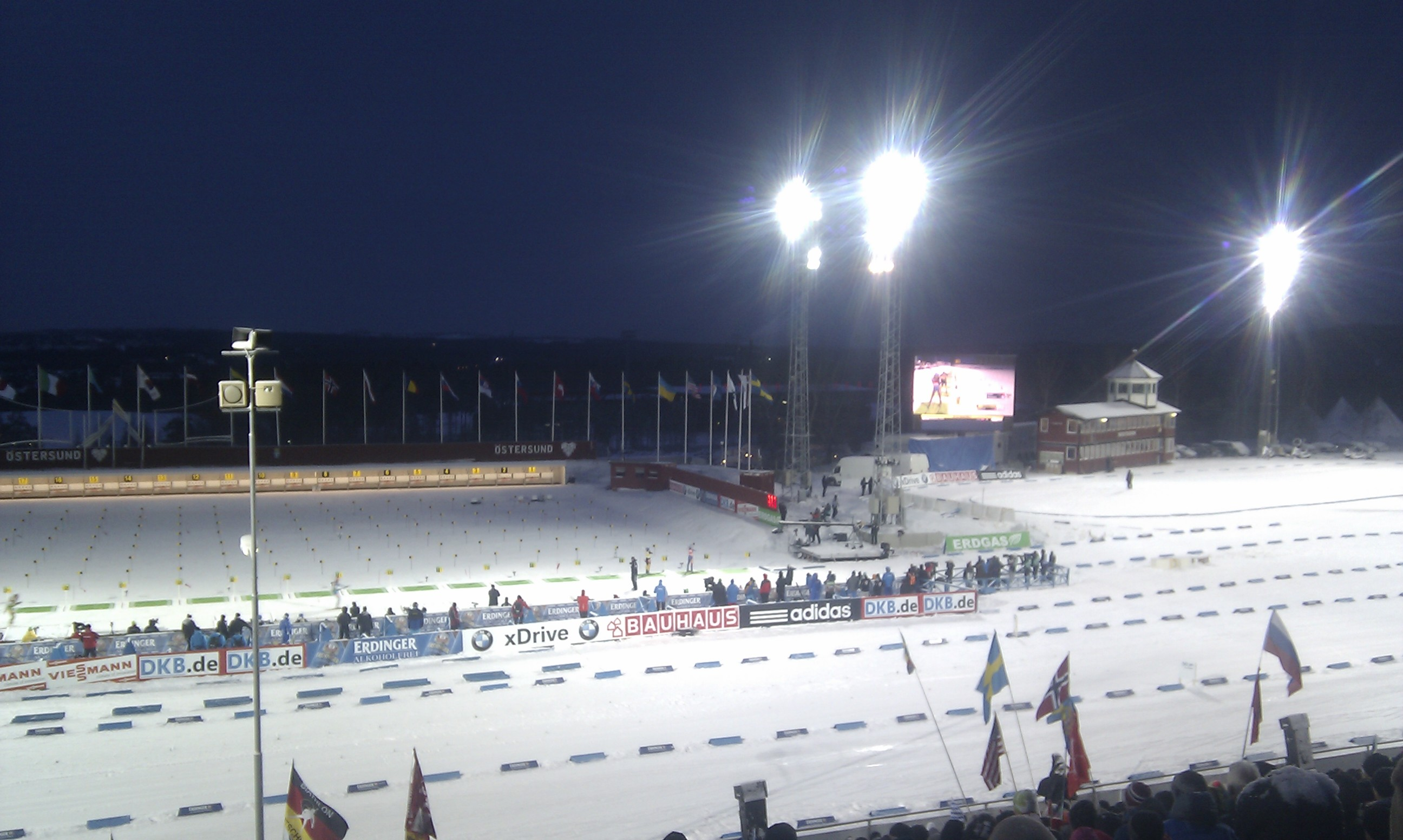
2011–12 World Cup in Östersund

The 2011–12 Biathlon World Cup was a multi-race tournament over a season of biathlon, organised by the International Biathlon Union. The season started on 30 November 2011 in Östersund, Sweden and ended on 18 March 2012 in Khanty-Mansiysk, Russia.

== Calendar ==
Below is the IBU World Cup calendar for the 2011–12 season.

Location	Date	Individual	Sprint	Pursuit	Mass start	Relay	Mixed relay	Details
(Sweden) Östersund	30 November–4 December	●	●	●				details
(Austria) Hochfilzen	7 December–11 December		●	●		●		details
(Austria) Hochfilzen	15–18 December		●	●			●	details
(Germany) Oberhof	4–8 January		●		●	●		details
(Czech Republic) Nové Město	11–15 January	●	●	●				details
(Italy) Antholz-Anterselva	19–22 January		●		●	●		details
(Norway) Holmenkollen	2–5 February		●	●	●			details
(Finland) Kontiolahti	10–12 February		●	●			●	details
(Germany) Ruhpolding	29 February–11 March	●	●	●	●	●	●	World Championships
(Russia) Khanty-Mansiysk	16–18 March		●	●	●			details
Total		3	10	8	5	4	3	

== World Cup podiums ==
=== Men ===
Stage	Date	Place	Discipline	Winner	Second	Third	Yellow bib (After competition)	Det.
1	30 November 2011	(Sweden) Östersund	20 km Individual	(France) Martin Fourcade	(Czech Republic) Michal Šlesingr	(Germany) Simon Schempp	(France) Martin Fourcade	Detail
1	2 December 2011	(Sweden) Östersund	10 km Sprint	(Sweden) Carl Johan Bergman	(Norway) Tarjei Bø	(Norway) Emil Hegle Svendsen	(France) Martin Fourcade	Detail
1	4 December 2011	(Sweden) Östersund	12.5 km Pursuit	(France) Martin Fourcade	(Norway) Emil Hegle Svendsen	(Czech Republic) Jaroslav Soukup	(France) Martin Fourcade	Detail
2	9 December 2011	(Austria) Hochfilzen	10 km Sprint	(Sweden) Carl Johan Bergman	(Russia) Andrei Makoveev	(Switzerland) Benjamin Weger	(France) Martin Fourcade	Detail
2	10 December 2011	(Austria) Hochfilzen	12.5 km Pursuit	(Norway) Emil Hegle Svendsen	(Norway) Tarjei Bø	(Switzerland) Benjamin Weger	(Sweden) Carl Johan Bergman	Detail
3	15 December 2011	(Austria) Hochfilzen	10 km Sprint	(Norway) Tarjei Bø	(France) Martin Fourcade	(Russia) Timofey Lapshin	(Norway) Tarjei Bø	Detail
3	17 December 2011	(Austria) Hochfilzen	12.5 km Pursuit	(Germany) Andreas Birnbacher	(Norway) Ole Einar Bjørndalen	(France) Simon Fourcade	(Norway) Tarjei Bø	Detail
4	7 January 2012	(Germany) Oberhof	10 km Sprint	(Germany) Arnd Peiffer	(France) Simon Fourcade	(Italy) Lukas Hofer	(Norway) Tarjei Bø	Detail
4	8 January 2012	(Germany) Oberhof	15 km Mass Start	(Germany) Andreas Birnbacher	(France) Simon Fourcade	(Norway) Emil Hegle Svendsen	(Norway) Emil Hegle Svendsen	Detail
5	12 January 2012	(Czech Republic) Nové Město na M.	20 km Individual	(Russia) Andrei Makoveev	(Norway) Emil Hegle Svendsen	(Sweden) Björn Ferry	(Norway) Emil Hegle Svendsen	Detail
5	14 January 2012	(Czech Republic) Nové Město na M.	10 km Sprint	(Norway) Emil Hegle Svendsen	(France) Simon Fourcade	(France) Martin Fourcade	(Norway) Emil Hegle Svendsen	Detail
5	15 January 2012	(Czech Republic) Nové Město na M.	12.5 km Pursuit	(Russia) Anton Shipulin	(France) Martin Fourcade	(France) Simon Fourcade	(Norway) Emil Hegle Svendsen	Detail
6	20 January 2012	(Italy) Antholz-Anterselva	10 km Sprint	(Sweden) Fredrik Lindström	(Russia) Evgeny Garanichev	(France) Martin Fourcade	(France) Martin Fourcade	Detail
6	21 January 2012	(Italy) Antholz-Anterselva	15 km Mass Start	(Germany) Andreas Birnbacher	(Russia) Anton Shipulin	(France) Martin Fourcade	(France) Martin Fourcade	Detail
7	2 February 2012	(Norway) Oslo Holmenkollen	10 km Sprint	(Russia) Evgeny Garanichev	(Germany) Arnd Peiffer	(Norway) Emil Hegle Svendsen	(France) Martin Fourcade	Detail
7	4 February 2012	(Norway) Oslo Holmenkollen	12.5 km Pursuit	(Germany) Arnd Peiffer	(Norway) Emil Hegle Svendsen	(Russia) Evgeny Garanichev	(Norway) Emil Hegle Svendsen	Detail
7	5 February 2012	(Norway) Oslo Holmenkollen	15 km Mass Start	(Norway) Emil Hegle Svendsen	(Germany) Andreas Birnbacher	(Russia) Evgeny Garanichev	(Norway) Emil Hegle Svendsen	Detail
8	11 February 2012	(Finland) Kontiolahti	10 km Sprint	(France) Martin Fourcade	(Russia) Timofey Lapshin	(Switzerland) Benjamin Weger	(France) Martin Fourcade	Detail
8	12 February 2012	(Finland) Kontiolahti	12.5 km Pursuit	(Norway) Ole Einar Bjørndalen	(France) Martin Fourcade	(Russia) Dmitry Malyshko	(France) Martin Fourcade	Detail
WC	3 March 2012	(Germany) Ruhpolding	10 km Sprint	(France) Martin Fourcade	(Norway) Emil Hegle Svendsen	(Sweden) Carl Johan Bergman	(France) Martin Fourcade	Detail
WC	4 March 2012	(Germany) Ruhpolding	12.5 km Pursuit	(France) Martin Fourcade	(Sweden) Carl Johan Bergman	(Russia) Anton Shipulin	(France) Martin Fourcade	Detail
WC	6 March 2012	(Germany) Ruhpolding	20 km Individual	(Slovenia) Jakov Fak	(France) Simon Fourcade	(Czech Republic) Jaroslav Soukup	(France) Martin Fourcade	Detail
WC	11 March 2012	(Germany) Ruhpolding	15 km Mass Start	(France) Martin Fourcade	(Sweden) Björn Ferry	(Sweden) Fredrik Lindström	(France) Martin Fourcade	Detail
9	16 March 2012	(Russia) Khanty-Mansiysk	10 km Sprint	(France) Martin Fourcade	(Germany) Arnd Peiffer	(Sweden) Fredrik Lindström	(France) Martin Fourcade	Detail
9	17 March 2012	(Russia) Khanty-Mansiysk	12.5 km Pursuit	(France) Martin Fourcade	(Germany) Arnd Peiffer	(Norway) Emil Hegle Svendsen	(France) Martin Fourcade	Detail
9	18 March 2012	(Russia) Khanty-Mansiysk	15 km Mass Start	(Norway) Emil Hegle Svendsen	(Germany) Arnd Peiffer	(Russia) Anton Shipulin	(France) Martin Fourcade	Detail

=== Women ===
Stage	Date	Place	Discipline	Winner	Second	Third	Yellow bib (After competition)	Det.
1	1 December 2011	(Sweden) Östersund	15 km Individual	(Belarus) Darya Domracheva	(Sweden) Anna Maria Nilsson	(Germany) Magdalena Neuner	(Belarus) Darya Domracheva	Detail
1	3 December 2011	(Sweden) Östersund	7.5 km Sprint	(Germany) Magdalena Neuner	(Norway) Tora Berger	(Finland) Kaisa Mäkäräinen	(Germany) Magdalena Neuner	Detail
1	4 December 2011	(Sweden) Östersund	10 km Pursuit	(Norway) Tora Berger	(Finland) Kaisa Mäkäräinen	(Germany) Magdalena Neuner	(Germany) Magdalena Neuner	Detail
2	9 December 2011	(Austria) Hochfilzen	7.5 km Sprint	(Germany) Magdalena Neuner	(Finland) Kaisa Mäkäräinen	(Russia) Olga Zaitseva	(Germany) Magdalena Neuner	Detail
2	10 December 2011	(Austria) Hochfilzen	10 km Pursuit	(Belarus) Darya Domracheva	(Russia) Olga Zaitseva	(Germany) Magdalena Neuner	(Germany) Magdalena Neuner	Detail
3	16 December 2011	(Austria) Hochfilzen	7.5 km Sprint	(Russia) Olga Zaitseva	(Belarus) Darya Domracheva	(Sweden) Helena Ekholm	(Germany) Magdalena Neuner	Detail
3	17 December 2011	(Austria) Hochfilzen	10 km Pursuit	(Russia) Olga Zaitseva	(Sweden) Helena Ekholm	(Belarus) Darya Domracheva	(Germany) Magdalena Neuner	Detail
4	6 January 2012	(Germany) Oberhof	7.5 km Sprint	(Germany) Magdalena Neuner	(Belarus) Darya Domracheva	(Russia) Olga Zaitseva	(Germany) Magdalena Neuner	Detail
4	8 January 2012	(Germany) Oberhof	12.5 km Mass Start	(Germany) Magdalena Neuner	(Norway) Tora Berger	(Germany) Andrea Henkel	(Germany) Magdalena Neuner	Detail
5	11 January 2012	(Czech Republic) Nové Město na M.	15 km Individual	(Finland) Kaisa Mäkäräinen	(Sweden) Helena Ekholm	(Germany) Magdalena Neuner	(Germany) Magdalena Neuner	Detail
5	13 January 2012	(Czech Republic) Nové Město na M.	7.5 km Sprint	(Russia) Olga Zaitseva	(Norway) Tora Berger	(Germany) Magdalena Neuner	(Germany) Magdalena Neuner	Detail
5	15 January 2012	(Czech Republic) Nové Město na M.	10 km Pursuit	(Norway) Tora Berger	(Sweden) Helena Ekholm	(France) Marie-Laure Brunet	(Germany) Magdalena Neuner	Detail
6	19 January 2012	(Italy) Antholz-Anterselva	7.5 km Sprint	(Germany) Magdalena Neuner	(Finland) Kaisa Mäkäräinen	(Belarus) Darya Domracheva	(Germany) Magdalena Neuner	Detail
6	22 January 2012	(Italy) Antholz-Anterselva	12.5 km Mass Start	(Belarus) Darya Domracheva	(Slovakia) Anastázia Kuzminová	(Germany) Magdalena Neuner	(Germany) Magdalena Neuner	Detail
7	2 February 2012	(Norway) Oslo Holmenkollen	7.5 km Sprint	(Germany) Magdalena Neuner	(Belarus) Darya Domracheva	(Norway) Tora Berger	(Germany) Magdalena Neuner	Detail
7	4 February 2012	(Norway) Oslo Holmenkollen	10 km Pursuit	(Germany) Magdalena Neuner	(Russia) Olga Zaitseva	(Belarus) Darya Domracheva	(Germany) Magdalena Neuner	Detail
7	5 February 2012	(Norway) Oslo Holmenkollen	12.5 km Mass Start	(Germany) Andrea Henkel	(Belarus) Darya Domracheva	(Sweden) Helena Ekholm	(Germany) Magdalena Neuner	Detail
8	11 February 2012	(Finland) Kontiolahti	7.5 km Sprint	(Germany) Magdalena Neuner	(Finland) Kaisa Mäkäräinen	(Belarus) Darya Domracheva	(Germany) Magdalena Neuner	Detail
8	12 February 2012	(Finland) Kontiolahti	10 km Pursuit	(Finland) Kaisa Mäkäräinen	(Germany) Magdalena Neuner	(Belarus) Darya Domracheva	(Germany) Magdalena Neuner	Detail
WC	3 March 2012	(Germany) Ruhpolding	7.5 km Sprint	(Germany) Magdalena Neuner	(Belarus) Darya Domracheva	(Ukraine) Vita Semerenko	(Germany) Magdalena Neuner	Detail
WC	4 March 2012	(Germany) Ruhpolding	10 km Pursuit	(Belarus) Darya Domracheva	(Germany) Magdalena Neuner	(Russia) Olga Vilukhina	(Germany) Magdalena Neuner	Detail
WC	7 March 2012	(Germany) Ruhpolding	15 km Individual	(Norway) Tora Berger	(France) Marie-Laure Brunet	(Sweden) Helena Ekholm	(Germany) Magdalena Neuner	Detail
WC	11 March 2012	(Germany) Ruhpolding	12.5 km Mass Start	(Norway) Tora Berger	(France) Marie-Laure Brunet	(Finland) Kaisa Mäkäräinen	(Germany) Magdalena Neuner	Detail
9	16 March 2012	(Russia) Khanty-Mansiysk	7.5 km Sprint	(Germany) Magdalena Neuner	(Ukraine) Vita Semerenko	(Belarus) Darya Domracheva	(Germany) Magdalena Neuner	Detail
9	17 March 2012	(Russia) Khanty-Mansiysk	10 km Pursuit	(Belarus) Darya Domracheva	(Finland) Kaisa Mäkäräinen	(Ukraine) Vita Semerenko	(Germany) Magdalena Neuner	Detail
9	18 March 2012	(Russia) Khanty-Mansiysk	12.5 km Mass Start	(Belarus) Darya Domracheva	(Norway) Tora Berger	(Finland) Kaisa Mäkäräinen	(Germany) Magdalena Neuner	Detail

=== Men's team ===
Event	Date	Place	Discipline	Winner	Second	Third
2	11 December 2011	(Austria) Hochfilzen	4x7.5 km Relay	Norway Rune Brattsveen; Lars Berger; Emil Hegle Svendsen; Tarjei Bø	Russia Anton Shipulin; Andrei Makoveev; Evgeny Ustyugov; Dmitry Malyshko	France Vincent Jay; Simon Fourcade; Alexis Boeuf; Martin Fourcade
4	5 January 2012	(Germany) Oberhof	4x7.5 km Relay	Italy Christian De Lorenzi; Markus Windisch; Dominik Windisch; Lukas Hofer	Russia Anton Shipulin; Evgeniy Garanichev; Evgeny Ustyugov; Alexey Volkov	Sweden Tobias Arwidson; Björn Ferry; Fredrik Lindström; Carl Johan Bergman
6	22 January 2012	(Italy) Antholz-Anterselva	4x7.5 km Relay	France Jean-Guillaume Béatrix; Simon Fourcade; Alexis Boeuf; Martin Fourcade	Germany Michael Rösch; Andreas Birnbacher; Florian Graf; Arnd Peiffer	Austria Simon Eder; Tobias Eberhard; Daniel Mesotitsch; Dominik Landertinger
WC	9 March 2012	(Germany) Ruhpolding	4x7.5 km Relay	Norway Ole Einar Bjørndalen; Rune Brattsveen; Tarjei Bø; Emil Hegle Svendsen	France Jean-Guillaume Béatrix; Simon Fourcade; Alexis Boeuf; Martin Fourcade	Germany Simon Schempp; Andreas Birnbacher; Michael Greis; Arnd Peiffer

=== Women's team ===
Event	Date	Place	Discipline	Winner	Second	Third
2	11 December 2011	(Austria) Hochfilzen	4x7.5 km Relay	Norway Fanny Horn; Elise Ringen; Synnove Solemdal; Tora Berger	France Marie-Laure Brunet; Anais Bescond; Sophie Boilley; Marie Dorin Habert	Russia Svetlana Sleptsova; Natalia Guseva; Anna Bogaliy-Titovets; Olga Zaitseva
4	4 January 2012	(Germany) Oberhof	4x7.5 km Relay	Russia Anna Bogaliy-Titovets; Svetlana Sleptsova; Olga Zaitseva; Olga Vilukhina	Norway Fanny Horn; Elise Ringen; Synnove Solemdal; Tora Berger	France Marie Dorin Habert; Anais Bescond; Marine Bolliet; Sophie Boilley
6	21 January 2012	(Italy) Antholz-Anterselva	4x7.5 km Relay	France Marie-Laure Brunet; Sophie Boilley; Anais Bescond; Marie Dorin Habert	Belarus Nadezhda Skardino; Liudmila Kalinchik; Natassia Dubarezava; Darya Domracheva	Russia Ekaterina Glazyrina; Svetlana Sleptsova; Olga Zaitseva; Olga Vilukhina
WC	10 March 2012	(Germany) Ruhpolding	4x7.5 km Relay	Germany Tina Bachmann; Magdalena Neuner; Miriam Gössner; Andrea Henkel	France Marie-Laure Brunet; Sophie Boilley; Anais Bescond; Marie Dorin Habert	Norway Fanny Horn; Elise Ringen; Synnove Solemdal; Tora Berger

=== Mixed Relay ===
Event	Date	Place	Discipline	Winner	Second	Third
3	18 December 2011	(Austria) Hochfilzen	4x7.5 km Relay	Russia Olga Vilukhina; Olga Zaitseva; Alexey Volkov; Anton Shipulin	Czech Republic Veronika Vítková; Gabriela Soukalová; Ondřej Moravec; Michal Šlesingr	France Marie Dorin Habert; Sophie Boilley; Alexis Boeuf; Simon Fourcade
8	10 February 2012	(Finland) Kontiolahti	4x7.5 km Relay	France Sophie Boilley; Anais Bescond; Jean-Guillaume Béatrix; Vincent Jay	Ukraine Natalya Burdyga; Olena Pidhrushna; Andriy Deryzemlya; Serhiy Sednev	Slovakia Jana Gereková; Anastasiya Kuzmina; Matej Kazár; Miroslav Matiaško
WC	1 March 2012	(Germany) Ruhpolding	4x7.5 km Relay	Norway Tora Berger; Synnove Solemdal; Ole Einar Bjørndalen; Emil Hegle Svendsen	Slovenia Andreja Mali; Teja Gregorin; Klemen Bauer; Jakov Fak	Germany Andrea Henkel; Magdalena Neuner; Andreas Birnbacher; Arnd Peiffer

== Standings: Men ==
=== Overall ===
Pos.		Points
1.	(France) Martin Fourcade	1100
2.	(Norway) Emil Hegle Svendsen	1035
3.	(Germany) Andreas Birnbacher	837
4.	(Germany) Arnd Peiffer	736
5.	(France) Simon Fourcade	716

- Final standings after 26 races.

=== Individual ===
Pos.		Points
1.	(France) Simon Fourcade	125
2.	(Slovenia) Jakov Fak	113
3.	(Norway) Emil Hegle Svendsen	108
4.	(France) Martin Fourcade	107
5.	(Czech Republic) Jaroslav Soukup	99

- Final standings after 3 races.

=== Sprint ===
Pos.		Points
1.	(France) Martin Fourcade	423
2.	(Norway) Emil Hegle Svendsen	378
3.	(Sweden) Carl Johan Bergman	287
4.	(Germany) Arnd Peiffer	270
5.	(Russia) Andrei Makoveev	261

- Final standings after 10 races.

=== Pursuit ===
Pos.		Points
1.	(France) Martin Fourcade	384
2.	(Norway) Emil Hegle Svendsen	348
3.	(Germany) Arnd Peiffer	257
4.	(Norway) Tarjei Bø	257
5.	(Norway) Ole Einar Bjørndalen	239

- Final standings after 8 races.

=== Mass start ===
Pos.		Points
1.	(Germany) Andreas Birnbacher	260
2.	(Norway) Emil Hegle Svendsen	218
3.	(France) Martin Fourcade	202
4.	(Sweden) Fredrik Lindström	175
5.	(Russia) Anton Shipulin	172

- Final standings after 5 races.

=== Relay ===
Pos.		Points
1.	France	198
2.	Norway	190
3.	Russia	189
4.	Germany	183
5.	Austria	166

- Final standings after 4 races.

=== Nation ===
Pos.		Points
1.	Russia	7070
2.	France	7044
3.	Germany	6901
4.	Norway	6712
5.	Sweden	6333

- Final standings after 20 races.

== Standings: Women ==
=== Overall ===
Pos.		Points
1.	(Germany) Magdalena Neuner	1216
2.	(Belarus) Darya Domracheva	1188
3.	(Norway) Tora Berger	1056
4.	(Finland) Kaisa Mäkäräinen	1011
5.	(Sweden) Helena Ekholm	898

- Final standings after 26 races.

=== Individual ===
Pos.		Points
1.	(Sweden) Helena Ekholm	138
2.	(Finland) Kaisa Mäkäräinen	116
3.	(Belarus) Darya Domracheva	116
4.	(Germany) Magdalena Neuner	114
5.	(Norway) Tora Berger	109

- Final standings after 3 races.

=== Sprint ===
Pos.		Points
1.	(Germany) Magdalena Neuner	571
2.	(Belarus) Darya Domracheva	471
3.	(Finland) Kaisa Mäkäräinen	402
4.	(Norway) Tora Berger	374
5.	(Russia) Olga Zaitseva	334

- Final standings after 10 races.

=== Pursuit ===
Pos.		Points
1.	(Belarus) Darya Domracheva	392
2.	(Germany) Magdalena Neuner	372
3.	(Norway) Tora Berger	361
4.	(Finland) Kaisa Mäkäräinen	330
5.	(Russia) Olga Zaitseva	313

- Final standings after 8 races.

=== Mass start ===
Pos.		Points
1.	(Belarus) Darya Domracheva	250
2.	(Norway) Tora Berger	242
3.	(France) Marie-Laure Brunet	202
4.	(Germany) Andrea Henkel	197
5.	(Finland) Kaisa Mäkäräinen	190

- Final standings after 5 races.

=== Relay ===
Pos.		Points
1.	France	216
2.	Norway	205
3.	Russia	192
4.	Germany	179
5.	Belarus	177

- Final standings after 4 races.

=== Nation ===
Pos.		Points
1.	Russia	7089
2.	Germany	7084
3.	France	6857
4.	Norway	6716
5.	Belarus	6490

- Final standings after 20 races.

== Standings: Mixed ==
=== Mixed Relay ===
Pos.		Points
1.	Russia	143
2.	France	138
3.	Germany	128
4.	Ukraine	115
5.	Sweden	114

- Final standings after 3 races.

== Medal table ==
Rank	Nation	Gold	Silver	Bronze	Total
1	Germany	17	9	10	36
2	Norway	14	12	6	32
3	France	11	12	8	31
4	Russia	8	8	12	28
5	Belarus	6	6	6	18
6	Sweden	3	6	7	16
7	Finland	2	5	3	10
8	Slovenia	1	1	1	3
9	Italy	1	0	0	1
10	Czech Republic	0	2	2	4
10	Ukraine	0	2	2	4
12	Slovakia	0	1	1	2
13	Switzerland	0	0	3	3
14	Austria	0	0	1	1
Totals (14 entries)		63	64	62	189

== Achievements ==
First World Cup career victory

- Andrei Makoveev (RUS), 29, in his 8th season — the WC 5 Individual in Nové Město; first podium was 2006-07 Sprint in Khanty-Mansiysk
- Fredrik Lindström (SWE), 22, in his 4th season — the WC 6 Sprint in Antholz; it also was his first podium
- Evgeniy Garanichev (RUS), 23, in his 2nd season — the WC 7 Sprint in Holmenkollen; first podium was 2011-12 Sprint in Antholz
- Jakov Fak (SLO), 24, in his 6th season — the World Championships Individual in Ruhpolding; first podium was 2008-09 Individual in Pyeong Chang

First World Cup podium

- Anna Maria Nilsson (SWE), 28, in her 10th season — no. 2 in the WC 1 Individual in Östersund
- Jaroslav Soukup (CZE), 29, in his 9th season — no. 3 in the WC 1 Pursuit in Östersund
- Timofey Lapshin (RUS), 23, in his 1st season — no. 3 in the WC 3 Sprint in Hochfilzen (2)
- Evgeniy Garanichev (RUS), 23, in his 2nd season — no. 2 in the WC 6 Sprint in Antholz
- Dmitry Malyshko (RUS), 24, in his 1st season — no. 3 in the WC 8 Pursuit in Kontiolahti
- Olga Vilukhina (RUS), 23, in her 3rd season — no. 3 in the World Championships Pursuit in Ruhpolding

Victory in this World Cup (all-time number of victories in parentheses)

Men

- Martin Fourcade (FRA), 8 (14) first places
- Emil Hegle Svendsen (NOR), 4 (28) first places
- Andreas Birnbacher (GER), 3 (4) first places
- Arnd Peiffer (GER), 2 (6) first places
- Carl Johan Bergman (SWE), 2 (3) first places
- Ole Einar Bjørndalen (NOR), 1 (93) first place
- Tarjei Bø (NOR), 1 (6) first place
- Anton Shipulin (RUS), 1 (2) first place
- Andrei Makoveev (RUS), 1 (1) first place
- Fredrik Lindström (SWE), 1 (1) first place
- Evgeniy Garanichev (RUS), 1 (1) first place
- Jakov Fak (SLO), 1 (1) first place

Women

- Magdalena Neuner (GER), 10 (34) first places
- Darya Domracheva (BLR), 6 (9) first places
- Tora Berger (NOR), 4 (16) first places
- Olga Zaitseva (RUS), 3 (12) first places
- Kaisa Mäkäräinen (FIN), 2 (5) first places
- Andrea Henkel (GER), 1 (21) first place

== Retirements ==
Following are notable biathletes who announced their retirement:

- Ekaterina Vinogradova (ARM)
- Nina Klenovska (BUL)
- Wang Chunli (CHN)
- Eveli Saue (EST)
- Sabrina Buchholz (GER)
- Magdalena Neuner (GER)
- Katja Haller (ITA)
- Christa Perathoner (ITA)
- Kari Eie (NOR)
- Birgitte Roeksund (NOR)
- Anna Bogaliy-Titovets (RUS)
- Uliana Denisova (RUS)
- Helena Ekholm (SWE)
- Anna Maria Nilsson (SWE)
- Laura Spector (USA)
- Tomasz Sikora (POL)
- Frode Andresen (NOR)
- Ilmars Bricis (LAT) (comeback in 2016–17 season)
