= 2010–11 Biathlon World Cup – Mixed relay =

The 2010–11 Biathlon World Cup – Mixed Relay will start at Sunday December 19, 2010 in Pokljuka and will finish Thursday March 3, 2011 in Khanty-Mansiysk at Biathlon World Championships 2011 event.

== Competition format ==
The relay teams consist of four biathletes. Legs 1 and 2 are done by the women, legs 3 and 4 by the men. The women's legs are 6 km and men's legs are 7.5 km., Every athlete leg skied over three laps, with two shooting rounds; one prone, one standing. For every round of five targets there are eight bullets available, though the last three can only be single-loaded manually one at a time from spare round holders or bullets deposited by the competitor into trays or onto the mat at the firing line. If after eight bullets there are still misses, one 150 m penalty loop must be taken for each missed target remaining. The first-leg participants start all at the same time, and as in cross-country skiing relays, every athlete of a team must touch the team's next-leg participant to perform a valid changeover. On the first shooting stage of the first leg, the participant must shoot in the lane corresponding to their bib number (Bib #10 shoots at lane #10 regardless of position in race.), then for the remainder of the relay, the relay team shoots at the lane in the position they arrived (Arrive at the range in 5th place, you shoot at lane five.).

== Medal winners ==
Event:	Gold:	Time	Silver:	Time	Bronze:	Time
Pokljuka details	Sweden; Helena Ekholm; Anna Carin Zidek; Fredrik Lindström; Carl Johan Bergman	1:17:52.0 (0+1) (0+0) (0+0) (0+2) (0+0) (0+2) (0+3) (0+2)	Ukraine; Olena Pidhrushna; Vita Semerenko; Serhiy Semenov; Serguei Sednev	1:17:52.3 (0+2) (0+1) (0+0) (0+2) (0+1) (0+0) (0+0) (0+1)	France; Marie-Laure Brunet; Marie Dorin; Vincent Jay; Martin Fourcade	1:17:53.3 (0+0) (0+1) (0+0) (0+1) (0+3) (0+2) (0+3) (0+0)
Presque Isle details	Germany; Kathrin Hitzer; Magdalena Neuner; Alexander Wolf; Daniel Böhm	1:13:31.6 (0+0) (0+2) (0+1) (0+1) (0+2) (0+1) (0+2) (0+2)	France; Marie-Laure Brunet; Sophie Boilley; Vincent Jay; Alexis Bœuf	1:13:59.5 (0+0) (0+2) (0+3) (0+1) (0+0) (0+0) (0+1) (0+0)	Russia; Svetlana Sleptsova; Natalia Guseva; Ivan Tcherezov; Maxim Tchoudov	1:14:33.0 (0+1) (0+2) (0+2) (0+1) (0+0) (0+2) (0+2) (0+3)
World Championships 2011 details	Norway; Tora Berger; Ann Kristin Flatland; Ole Einar Bjørndalen; Tarjei Bø	1:14:22.5 (0+1) (0+0) (0+1) (0+1) (0+2) (0+1) (0+0) (0+1)	Germany; Andrea Henkel; Magdalena Neuner; Arnd Peiffer; Michael Greis	1:14:45.4 (0+2) (0+0) (0+0) (0+0) (0+1) (0+2) (0+2) (0+1)	France; Marie-Laure Brunet; Marie Dorin; Alexis Bœuf; Martin Fourcade	1:15:38.7 (0+2) (0+2) (0+0) (0+3) (0+0) (0+1) (0+0) (0+0)

== Standings ==
#	Name	POK	PRI	WCH	Total
1	France	48	54	48	150
2	Germany	34	60	54	148
3	Sweden	60	38	43	141
4	Russia	43	48	38	129
5	Italy	38	43	40	121
6	Norway	29	31	60	120
7	Ukraine	54	30	34	118
8	Slovenia	40	40	25	105
9	United States	30	36	28	94
10	Finland	27	32	32	91
11	Poland	23	34	24	81
12	Slovakia	36	—	29	66
13	Belarus	32	—	31	63
14	Estonia	31	—	27	58
15	Canada	28	29	—	57
16	Czech Republic	22	—	30	52
17	Switzerland	19	—	26	45
17	Kazakhstan	26	—	19	45
19	Japan	24	—	20	44
20	China	21	—	21	42
21	Bulgaria	25	—	16	41
22	Romania	20	—	18	38
23	Austria	—	—	36	36
24	Latvia	—	—	23	23
25	Great Britain	—	—	22	22
26	Lithuania	—	—	17	17
27	South Korea	—	—	15	15
