= 2011–12 Biathlon World Cup – World Cup 3 =

Coordinates: 47°28′N 12°37′E

The 2011–12 Biathlon World Cup – World Cup 3 was held in Hochfilzen, Austria, from 15 December until 18 December 2011. This was the second World Cup event in Hochfilzen in 2011–12 season, due to the lack of snow in Annecy.

== Schedule of events ==
The time schedule of the event stands below

Date	Time	Events
December 15	14:30 CET	Men's 10 km Sprint
December 16	14:30 CET	Women's 7.5 km Sprint
December 17	12:00 CET	Men's 12.5 km Pursuit
December 17	14:30 CET	Women's 10 km Pursuit
December 18	14:30 CET	Mixed Relay

== Medal winners ==
=== Men ===
Event:	Gold:	Time	Silver:	Time	Bronze:	Time
10 km Sprint details	Tarjei Bø; Norway	23:57.2 (1+0)	Martin Fourcade; France	24:01.2 (1+1)	Timofey Lapshin; Russia	24:14.4 (0+0)
12.5 km Pursuit details	Andreas Birnbacher; Germany	35:40.3 (0+0+0+0)	Ole Einar Bjørndalen; Norway	35:40.5 (0+0+0+0)	Simon Fourcade; France	35:41.6 (1+0+0+0)

=== Women ===
Event:	Gold:	Time	Silver:	Time	Bronze:	Time
7.5 km Sprint details	Olga Zaitseva; Russia	20:36.6 (0+1)	Darya Domracheva; Belarus	20:50.5 (1+1)	Helena Ekholm; Sweden	21:06.8 (1+0)
10 km Pursuit details	Olga Zaitseva; Russia	31:52.2 (0+0+0+0)	Helena Ekholm; Sweden	32:21.3 (0+0+0+1)	Darya Domracheva; Belarus	32:36.9 (1+1+0+1)

=== Mixed ===
Event:	Gold:	Time	Silver:	Time	Bronze:	Time
2 x 6 km + 2 x 7.5 km Relay details	Russia; Olga Vilukhina; Olga Zaitseva; Alexey Volkov; Anton Shipulin	1:13:33.4 (0+0) (0+3) (0+2) (0+0) (0+0) (0+0) (0+0) (0+0)	Czech Republic; Veronika Vítková; Gabriela Soukalová; Ondřej Moravec; Michal Šlesingr	1:14:00.4 (0+1) (0+2) (0+0) (0+0) (0+1) (0+0) (0+0) (0+1)	France; Marie Dorin Habert; Sophie Boilley; Alexis Bœuf; Simon Fourcade	1:14:11.9 (0+0) (0+2) (0+2) (0+2) (0+0) (0+1) (0+2) (0+0)

== Achievements ==
Best performance for all time

- Timofey Lapshin (RUS), 3rd place in Sprint
- Jean-Guillaume Béatrix (FRA), 4th place in Sprint
- Tomas Holubec (CZE), 9th place in Sprint
- Martin Eng (NOR), 11th place in Sprint
- Vladimir Iliev (BUL), 20th place in Sprint
- Vladimir Alenishko (BLR), 33rd place in Sprint
- Mario Dolder (SUI), 34th place in Sprint
- Rolands Puzulis (LAT), 69th place in Sprint
- Jialin Tang (CHN), 6th place in Sprint
- Nastassia Dubarezava (BLR), 10th place in Sprint
- Anna Karin Strömstedt (SWE), 16th place in Sprint
- Romana Schrempf (AUT), 21st place in Sprint
- Megan Imrie (CAN), 25th place in Sprint and 24th place in Pursuit
- Elisa Gasparin (SUI), 41st place in Sprint
- Iryna Kryuko (BLR), 40th place in Pursuit

First World Cup race

- Manuel Fernandez Musso (ESP), 104th place in Sprint
- Ane Skrove Nossum (NOR), 34th place in Sprint
- Birgitte Roeksund (NOR), 35th place in Sprint
- Iryna Kryuko (BLR), 46th place in Sprint
