= 2011–12 Biathlon World Cup – World Cup 6 =

Coordinates: 46°51′N 12°6′E

The 2011–12 Biathlon World Cup – World Cup 6 was held in Antholz, Italy, from 19 January until 22 January 2012.

== Schedule of events ==
Date	Time	Events
January 19	14:30 CET	Women's 7.5 km Sprint
January 20	14:30 CET	Men's 10 km Sprint
January 21	12:45 CET	Women's 4 x 6 km Relay
January 21	15:15 CET	Men's 15 km Mass Start
January 22	12:00 CET	Women's 12.5 km Mass Start
January 22	15:00 CET	Men's 4 x 7.5 km Relay

== Medal winners ==
=== Men ===
Event:	Gold:	Time	Silver:	Time	Bronze:	Time
10 km Sprint details	Fredrik Lindström; Sweden	24:37.9 (0+0)	Evgeniy Garanichev; Russia	24:56.1 (0+0)	Martin Fourcade; France	24:57.0 (0+0)
15 km Mass Start details	Andreas Birnbacher; Germany	38:45.7 (0+0+1+0)	Anton Shipulin; Russia	38:45.8 (0+0+1+0)	Martin Fourcade; France	38:46.0 (0+0+0+1)
4 x 7.5 km Relay details	France; Jean-Guillaume Béatrix; Simon Fourcade; Alexis Bœuf; Martin Fourcade	1:12:14.7 (0+1) (0+0) (0+1) (0+2) (0+0) (0+1) (0+1) (0+1)	Germany; Michael Rösch; Andreas Birnbacher; Florian Graf; Arnd Peiffer	1:12:26.7 (0+1) (0+1) (0+0) (0+2) (0+1) (0+1) (0+0) (1+3)	Austria; Simon Eder; Tobias Eberhard; Daniel Mesotitsch; Dominik Landertinger	1:12:56.4 (0+0) (0+1) (0+0) (0+2) (0+1) (0+3) (0+1) (0+1)

=== Women ===
Event:	Gold:	Time	Silver:	Time	Bronze:	Time
7.5 km Sprint details	Magdalena Neuner; Germany	20:27.7 (0+1)	Kaisa Mäkäräinen; Finland	20:45.2 (0+0)	Darya Domracheva; Belarus	20:58.2 (2+0)
4 x 6 km Relay details	France; Marie Laure Brunet; Sophie Boilley; Anais Bescond; Marie Dorin Habert	1:17:06.5 (0+0) (0+2) (0+1) (0+3) (0+2) (0+1) (0+0) (0+0)	Belarus; Nadezhda Skardino; Liudmila Kalinchik; Nastassia Dubarezava; Darya Domracheva	1:17:09.0 (0+1) (0+0) (0+0) (0+2) (0+2) (0+3) (0+1) (0+1)	Russia; Ekaterina Glazyrina; Svetlana Sleptsova; Olga Zaitseva; Olga Vilukhina	1:17:27.9 (0+2) (0+1) (0+1) (0+2) (0+1) (1+3) (0+1) (0+0)
12.5 km Mass Start details	Darya Domracheva; Belarus	35:03.6 (2+0+0+0)	Anastasiya Kuzmina; Slovakia	35:28.8 (0+0+0+1)	Magdalena Neuner; Germany	35:35.7 (0+0+0+2)

== Achievements ==
Best performance for all time

- Fredrik Lindström (SWE), 1st place in Sprint
- Evgeniy Garanichev (RUS), 2nd place in Sprint
- Scott Perras (CAN), 29th place in Sprint
- Martin Bogdanov (BUL), 51st place in Sprint
- Michail Kletcherov (BUL), 13th place in Mass Start
- Susan Dunklee (USA), 17th place in Sprint
- Ingela Andersson (SWE), 44th place in Sprint
