= 2011–12 Biathlon World Cup – World Cup 5 =

Coordinates: 49°34′N 16°5′E

The 2011–12 Biathlon World Cup – World Cup 5 is held in Nové Město, Czech Republic, from 11 January until 15 January 2012.

== Schedule of events ==
| Date | Time | Events |
|---|---|---|
| January 11 | 14:15 CET | Women's 15 km Individual |
| January 12 | 14:15 CET | Men's 20 km Individual |
| January 13 | 14:30 CET | Women's 7.5 km Sprint |
| January 14 | 13:45 CET | Men's 10 km Sprint |
| January 15 | 12:45 CET | Women's 10 km Pursuit |
| January 15 | 14:30 CET | Men's 12.5 km Pursuit |

== Medal winners ==
=== Men ===
| Event: | Gold: | Time | Silver: | Time | Bronze: | Time |
|---|---|---|---|---|---|---|
| 20 km Individual details | Andrei Makoveev; Russia | 47:19.0 (0+0+0+0) | Emil Hegle Svendsen; Norway | 48:18.7 (1+0+0+1) | Björn Ferry; Sweden | 48:33.8 (0+0+0+1) |
| 10 km Sprint details | Emil Hegle Svendsen; Norway | 27:13.1 (0+1) | Simon Fourcade; France | 27:15.8 (1+2) | Martin Fourcade; France | 27:22.7 (1+1) |
| 12.5 km Pursuit details | Anton Shipulin; Russia | 34:50.8 (0+0+1+0) | Martin Fourcade; France | 35:01.9 (1+0+1+1) | | |
| 12.5 km Pursuit details | Anton Shipulin; Russia | 34:50.8 (0+0+1+0) | Arnd Peiffer; Germany | 35:01.9 (1+0+1+1) | | |

=== Women ===
| Event: | Gold: | Time | Silver: | Time | Bronze: | Time |
|---|---|---|---|---|---|---|
| 15 km Individual details | Kaisa Mäkäräinen; Finland | 45:03.3 (0+1+1+0) | Helena Ekholm; Sweden | 45:25.3 (0+0+0+1) | Magdalena Neuner; Germany | 45:36.2 (0+1+0+1) |
| 7.5 km Sprint details | Olga Zaitseva; Russia | 23:08.1 (0+0) | Tora Berger; Norway | 23:33.6 (1+1) | Magdalena Neuner; Germany | 23:42.6 (0+3) |
| 10 km Pursuit details | Tora Berger; Norway | 31:00.3 (0+1+2+0) | Helena Ekholm; Sweden | 31:18.2 (0+0+0+0) | Marie Laure Brunet; France | 31:25.4 (0+0+0+0) |

== Achievements ==
Best performance for all time

- Andrei Makoveev (RUS), 1st place in Individual
- Milanko Petrovic (SRB), 51st place in Individual
- Stefan Gavrila (ROU), 73rd place in Individual
- Manuel Fernandez Musso (ESP), 92nd place in Individual
- Russell Currier (USA), 6th place in Sprint
- Dmitry Malyshko (RUS), 9th place in Sprint and 5th place in Pursuit
- Vasja Rupnik (SLO), 15th place in Sprint
- Kauri Koiv (EST), 22nd place in Sprint
- Ahti Toivanen (FIN), 37th place in Sprint
- Evgeniy Garanichev (RUS), 7th place in Pursuit
- Ekaterina Glazyrina (RUS), 6th place in Individual and Sprint
- Megan Imrie (CAN), 20th place in Individual
- Emőke Szőcs (HUN), 62nd place in Individual
- Yuki Nakajima (JPN), 79th place in Individual and 56th in Sprint
- Lili Drcar (SLO), 81st place in Individual
- Baiba Bendika (LAT), 88th place in Individual
- Olga Vilukhina (RUS), 5th place in Sprint
- Ekaterina Shumilova (RUS), 30th place in Sprint and 24th in Pursuit
- Luminita Piscoran (ROU), 35th place in Sprint
- Martina Chrapanova (SVK), 48th place in Sprint
- Annalies Cook (USA), 51st place in Sprint
- Eevamari Oksanen (FIN), 58th place in Sprint
- Zanna Juskane (LAT), 63rd place in Sprint
- Grete Gaim (EST), 75th place in Sprint
- Natalya Burdyga (UKR), 6th place in Pursuit
- Bente Lendheim (NOR), 25th place in Pursuit

First World Cup race

- Jacquemine Baud (FRA), 64th place in Individual
- Paulina Fialkova (SVK), 84th place in Sprint
