= Megan Tandy =

Canadian biathlete

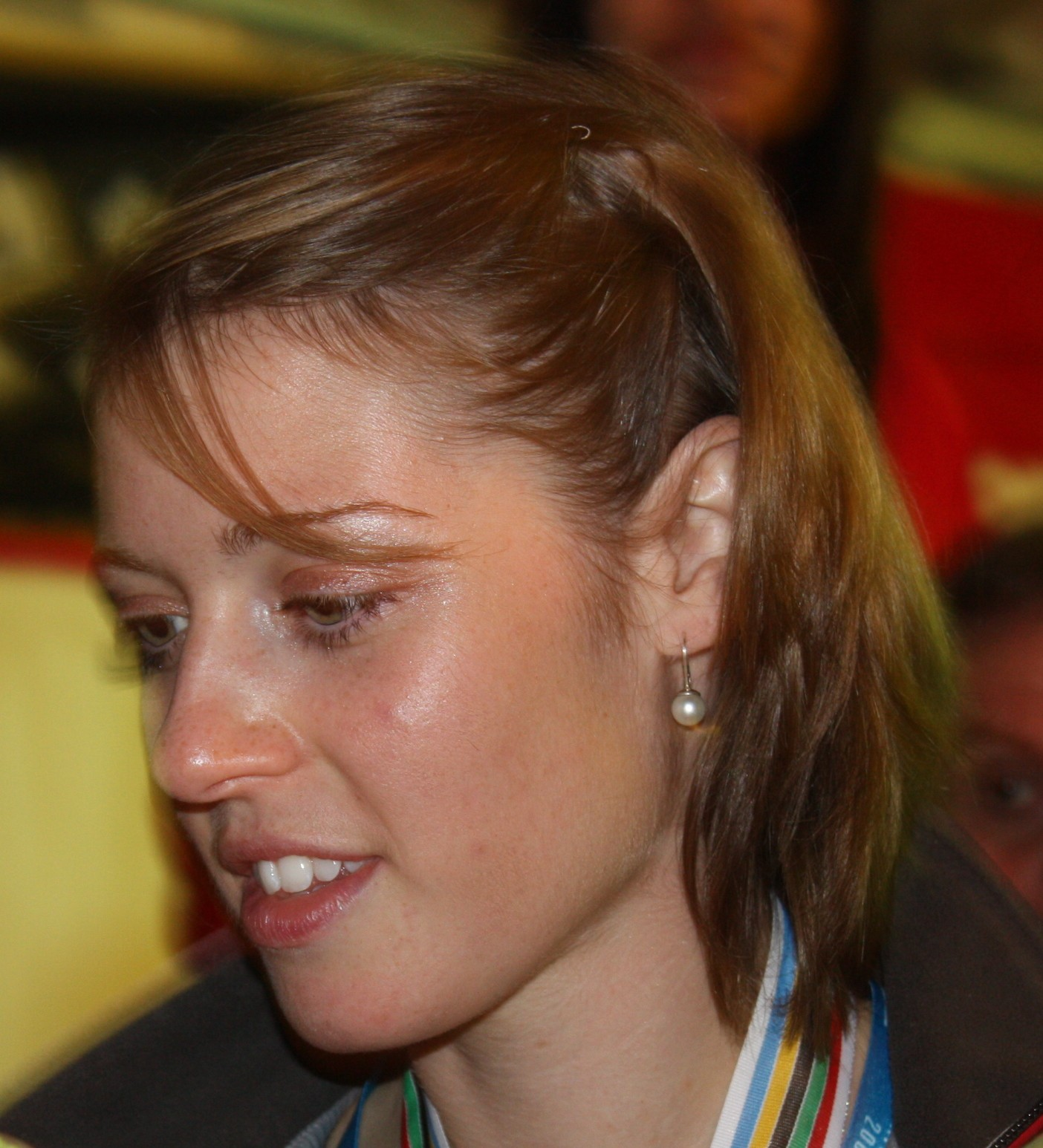
- Tandy in 2009

Personal information
- Born: 10 September 1988 (age 37) Victoria, British Columbia, Canada
- Height: 170 cm (5 ft 7 in)
- Weight: 59 kg (130 lb)

Sport
- Sport: Skiing
- Club: BC High Performance Club; Squamish, British Columbia
- Updated on 17 February 2010

Megan Tandy (formerly Megan Heinicke; born 10 September 1988) is a Canadian biathlete.

== Career ==
Tandy was raised in Prince George, British Columbia.

She competed at the 2010 Winter Olympics in Vancouver in the women's sprint (7.5 km), pursuit (10 km), mass start (12.5 km) and individual (15 km) competitions.

She placed 46th in the sprint on 13 February 2010 with a time of 22:07.7 and no penalties, resulting in a +2:12.1 deficit. In the pursuit on 16 February, she placed 36th with a time of 34:02.2 with one penalty, resulting in a +3:46.2 deficit.

Along with Canadian biathletes Zina Kocher, Sandra Keith, Rosanna Crawford, and Megan Imrie, she posed for the Bold Beautiful Biathlon calendar to raise money to cover annual expenses for training and competition.

In January 2014 she was named to the 2014 Winter Olympic team.

== Personal life ==
Megan Tandy married coach Ilmar Heinicke weeks after the 2010 Olympics and took her husband's surname. Her son, Predo, was born in November 2010. Tandy and Heinicke separated in September 2014.

=== 2018 Winter Olympics ===
In January 2018, Tandy was named to Canada's 2018 Olympic team.

== Biathlon results ==
All results are sourced from the International Biathlon Union.

=== Olympic Games ===
0 medals

Event	Individual	Sprint	Pursuit	Mass start	Relay	Mixed relay
(Canada) 2010 Vancouver	49th	45th	35th	—	14th	
(Russia) 2014 Sochi	51st	59th	DNF	—	7th	—
(South Korea) 2018 Pyeongchang	—	57th	DNS	—	—	—

:*The mixed relay was added as an event in 2014.

=== World Championships ===
0 medals

Event	Individual	Sprint	Pursuit	Mass start	Relay	Mixed relay
(Germany) 2012 Ruhpolding	30th	52nd	42nd	—	13th	—
(Czech Republic) 2013 Nové Město	50th	54th	44th	—	12th	15th
(Finland) 2015 Kontiolahti	21st	23rd	27th	23rd	9th	—
(Austria) 2017 Hochfilzen	43rd	64th	—	—	16th	—

*During Olympic seasons competitions are only held for those events not included in the Olympic program.
