= 2011–12 Biathlon World Cup – World Cup 1 =

Coordinates: 63°11′N 14°38′E

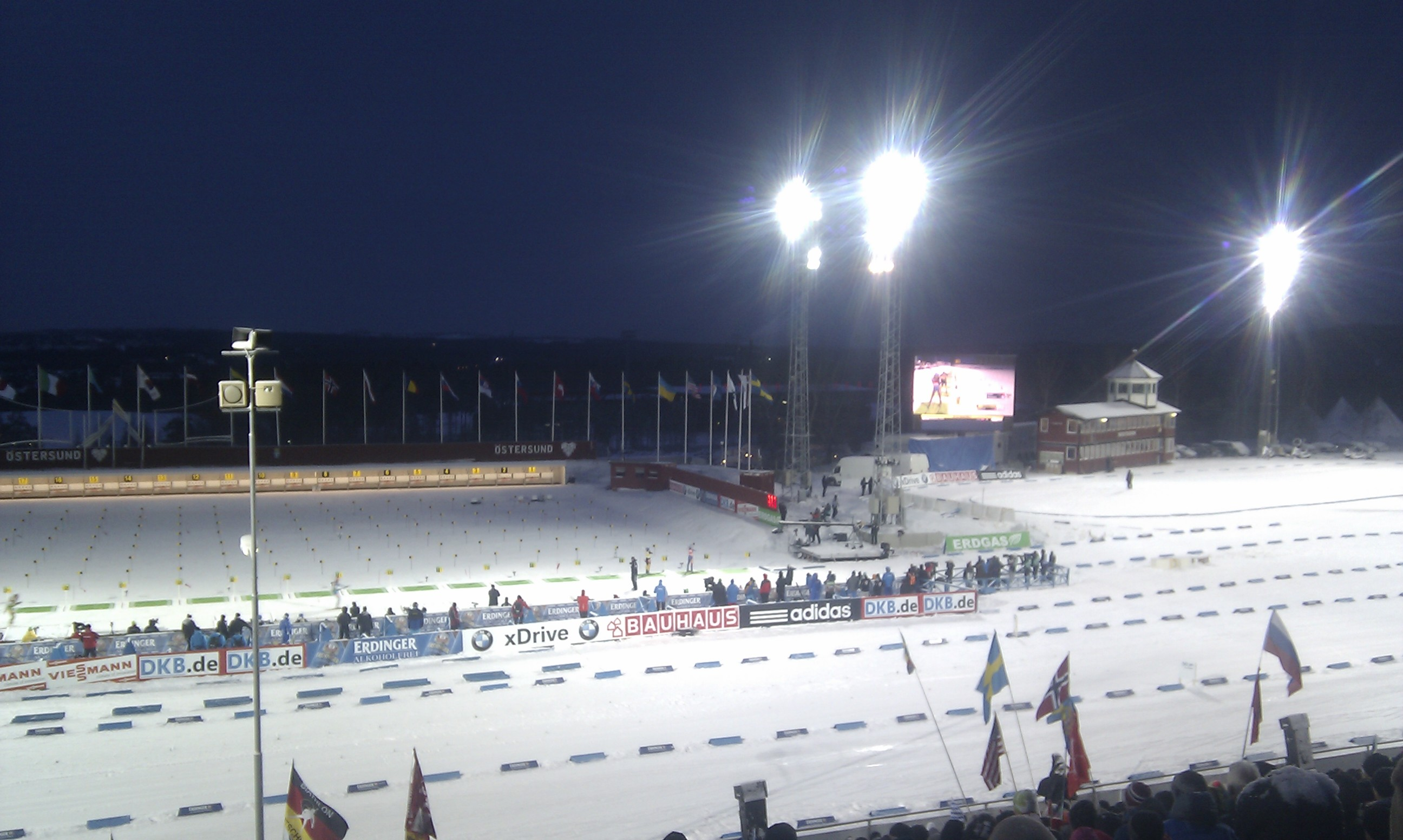
World cup in Östersund

The 2011–12 Biathlon World Cup – World Cup 1 is the opening event of the season and is held in Östersund, Sweden, from 30 November until 4 December 2011.

== Schedule of events ==
The time schedule of the event stands below

Date	Time	Events
November 30	17:15 CET	Men's 20 km Individual
December 1	17:15 CET	Women's 15 km Individual
December 2	16:15 CET	Men's 10 km Sprint
December 3	14:30 CET	Women's 7.5 km Sprint
December 4	12:15 CET	Men's 12.5 km Pursuit
December 4	14:30 CET	Women's 10 km Pursuit

== Medal winners ==
=== Men ===
Event:	Gold:	Time	Silver:	Time	Bronze:	Time
20 km Individual details	Martin Fourcade; France	53:29.8 (0+0+0+1)	Michal Šlesingr; Czech Republic	55:24.1 (0+1+0+0)	Simon Schempp; Germany	55:24.3 (1+0+0+0)
10 km Sprint details	Carl Johan Bergman; Sweden	24:22.5 (0+0)	Tarjei Bø; Norway	24:30.1 (0+0)	Emil Hegle Svendsen; Norway	23:35.5 (0+1)
12.5 km Pursuit details	Martin Fourcade; France	32:56.0 (0+0+0+0)	Emil Hegle Svendsen; Norway	33:21.5 (0+0+1+1)	Jaroslav Soukup; Czech Republic	33:22.9 (0+1+0+0)

=== Women ===
Event:	Gold:	Time	Silver:	Time	Bronze:	Time
15 km Individual details	Darya Domracheva; Belarus	47:15.6 (1+1+0+0)	Anna Maria Nilsson; Sweden	48:24.1 (1+0+0+0)	Magdalena Neuner; Germany	48:57.3 (0+1+0+2)
7.5 km Sprint details	Magdalena Neuner; Germany	22:01.7 (0+1)	Tora Berger; Norway	22:01.9 (0+1)	Kaisa Mäkäräinen; Finland	22:16.9 (2+0)
10 km Pursuit details	Tora Berger; Norway	33:56.9 (0+0+0+1)	Kaisa Mäkäräinen; Finland	34:30.1 (0+1+0+1)	Magdalena Neuner; Germany	35:21.3 (0+1+2+1)

== Achievements ==
Best performance for all time

- Evgeniy Garanichev (RUS), 10th place in Individual
- Je-Uk Jun (KOR), 83rd place in Individual
- Stefan Gavrila (ROU), 84th place in Individual and 83rd place in Sprint
- Lowell Bailey (USA), 5th place in Sprint
- Sven Grossegger (AUT), 10th place in Sprint
- Dušan Šimočko (SVK), 17th place in Sprint
- Dominik Windisch (ITA), 23rd place in Sprint
- Lars Helge Birkeland (NOR), 29th place in Sprint
- Aliaksandr Babchyn (BLR), 37th place in Sprint
- Alexandr Trifonov (KAZ), 53rd place in Sprint
- Scott Gow (CAN), 80th place in Sprint
- Mario Dolder (SUI), 89th place in Sprint
- Jaroslav Soukup (CZE), 3rd place in Pursuit
- Anna Maria Nilsson (SWE), 2nd place in Individual
- Olena Pidhrushna (UKR), 5th place in Individual
- Synnøve Solemdal (NOR), 13th place in Individual and 4th place in Sprint
- Emelie Larsson (SWE), 21st place in Individual
- Romana Schrempf (AUT), 26th place in Individual
- Laure Bosc (FRA), 28th place in Individual
- Elise Ringen (NOR), 32nd place in Individual, 20th place in Sprint and 12th in Pursuit
- Kristel Viigipuu (EST), 38th place in Individual
- Darya Yurkevich (BLR), 51st place in Individual
- Martina Chrapanova (SVK), 55th place in Individual
- Sanna Markkanen (FIN), 69th place in Individual
- Elin Mattsson (SWE), 72nd place in Individual
- Chardine Sloof (NED), 78th place in Individual and 71st in Sprint
- Anete Brice (LAT), 83rd place in Individual
- Susan Dunklee (USA), 28th place in Sprint
- Darya Usanova (KAZ), 35th place in Sprint
- Niya Dimitrova (BUL), 52nd place in Sprint
- Nastassia Dubarezava (BLR), 33rd place in Pursuit

First World Cup race

- Florent Claude (FRA), 37th place in Individual
- Lars Helge Birkeland (NOR), 42nd place in Individual
- Aliaksandr Babchyn (BLR), 73rd place in Individual
- Mario Dolder (SUI), 94th place in Individual
- Scott Gow (CAN), 101st place in Individual
- Maksim Burtasov (RUS), 92nd place in Sprint
- Marcis Paeglitis (LAT), 102nd place in Sprint
- Franziska Hildebrand (GER), 6th place in Individual
- Susan Dunklee (USA), 45th place in Individual
- Darya Usanova (KAZ), 56th place in Individual
- Anna Kistanova (KAZ), 80th place in Individual
- Grete Gaim (EST), 81st place in Sprint
- Ingela Andersson (SWE), 82nd place in Sprint
- Galina Okolzdayeva (KAZ), 84th place in Sprint
- Baiba Bendika (LAT), 93rd place in Sprint
