= 2011–12 Biathlon World Cup – World Cup 7 =

Coordinates: 59°55′N 10°39′E

The 2011–12 Biathlon World Cup – World Cup 7 was held in Holmenkollen, Oslo, Norway, from 2 February until 5 February 2012.

== Schedule of events ==
Date	Time	Events
February 2	11:30 CET	Women's 7.5 km Sprint
February 2	14:30 CET	Men's 10 km Sprint
February 4	13:15 CET	Women's 10 km Pursuit
February 4	15:15 CET	Men's 12.5 km Pursuit
February 5	13:15 CET	Women's 12.5 km Mass Start
February 5	15:15 CET	Men's 15 km Mass Start

== Medal winners ==
=== Men ===
Event:	Gold:	Time	Silver:	Time	Bronze:	Time
10 km Sprint details	Evgeniy Garanichev; Russia	25:22.2 (0+0)	Arnd Peiffer; Germany	25:22.9 (0+0)	Emil Hegle Svendsen; Norway	25:34.0 (0+2)
12.5 km Pursuit details	Arnd Peiffer; Germany	31:44.0 (0+0+0+0)	Emil Hegle Svendsen; Norway	32:15.2 (0+1+0+1)	Evgeniy Garanichev; Russia	32:20.3 (0+0+1+1)
15 km Mass Start details	Emil Hegle Svendsen; Norway	40:44.1 (0+1+1+0)	Andreas Birnbacher; Germany	40:50.4 (0+0+0+0)	Evgeniy Garanichev; Russia	41:01.9 (0+0+1+1)

=== Women ===
Event:	Gold:	Time	Silver:	Time	Bronze:	Time
7.5 km Sprint details	Magdalena Neuner; Germany	20:41.9 (0+0)	Darya Domracheva; Belarus	21:20.1 (0+1)	Tora Berger; Norway	21:30.8 (1+0)
10 km Pursuit details	Magdalena Neuner; Germany	30:31.1 (0+1+1+0)	Olga Zaitseva; Russia	31:07.6 (0+0+0+0)	Darya Domracheva; Belarus	31:22.5 (0+0+2+0)
12.5 km Mass Start details	Andrea Henkel; Germany	38:01.2 (1+0+0+0)	Darya Domracheva; Belarus	38:27.8 (1+1+1+1)	Teja Gregorin; Slovenia	38:28.4 (0+0+0+0)

== Achievements ==
Best performance for all time

- Evgeniy Garanichev (RUS), 1st place in Sprint
- Brendan Green (CAN), 9th place in Sprint
- Scott Perras (CAN), 27th place in Sprint
- Maksim Burtasov (RUS), 38th place in Sprint and 32nd in Pursuit
- Karolis Zlatkauskas (LTU), 71st place in Sprint
- Martin Rammelg (EST), 82nd place in Sprint
- Ivan Zlatev (BUL), 86th place in Sprint
- Vincent Naveau (BEL), 87th place in Sprint
- Edin Hodzic (SRB), 88th place in Sprint
- Dmitry Malyshko (RUS), 4th place in Mass Start
- Megan Imrie (CAN), 17th place in Sprint
- Mari Laukkanen (FIN), 20th place in Sprint and 14th in Pursuit
- Luminita Piscoran (ROU), 26th place in Sprint
- Annelies Cook (USA), 33rd place in Sprint
- Tiril Eckhoff (NOR), 45th place in Sprint
- Natalija Kocergina (LTU), 52nd place in Sprint
- Elin Mattsson (SWE), 58th place in Sprint
- Naoko Azegami (JPN), 68th place in Sprint
- Dafinka Koeva (BUL), 74th place in Sprint
- Anna-Carin Strömstedt (SWE), 15th place in Pursuit
- Emilia Yordanova (BUL), 38th place in Pursuit

First World Cup race

- Christoffer Eriksson (SWE), 49th place in Sprint
- Gabriel Stegmayr (SWE), 79th place in Sprint
- Mykhaylo Serdyuk (UKR), 80th place in Sprint
- Vasil Chorbadzhiev (BUL), 89th place in Sprint
- Kateryna Tseselska (UKR), 66th place in Sprint
- Yan Zhang (CHN), 67th place in Sprint
- Jitka Landová (CZE), 71st place in Sprint
- Florina-Ioana Cirstea (ROU), 73rd place in Sprint
