= Zina Kocher =

Canadian biathlete

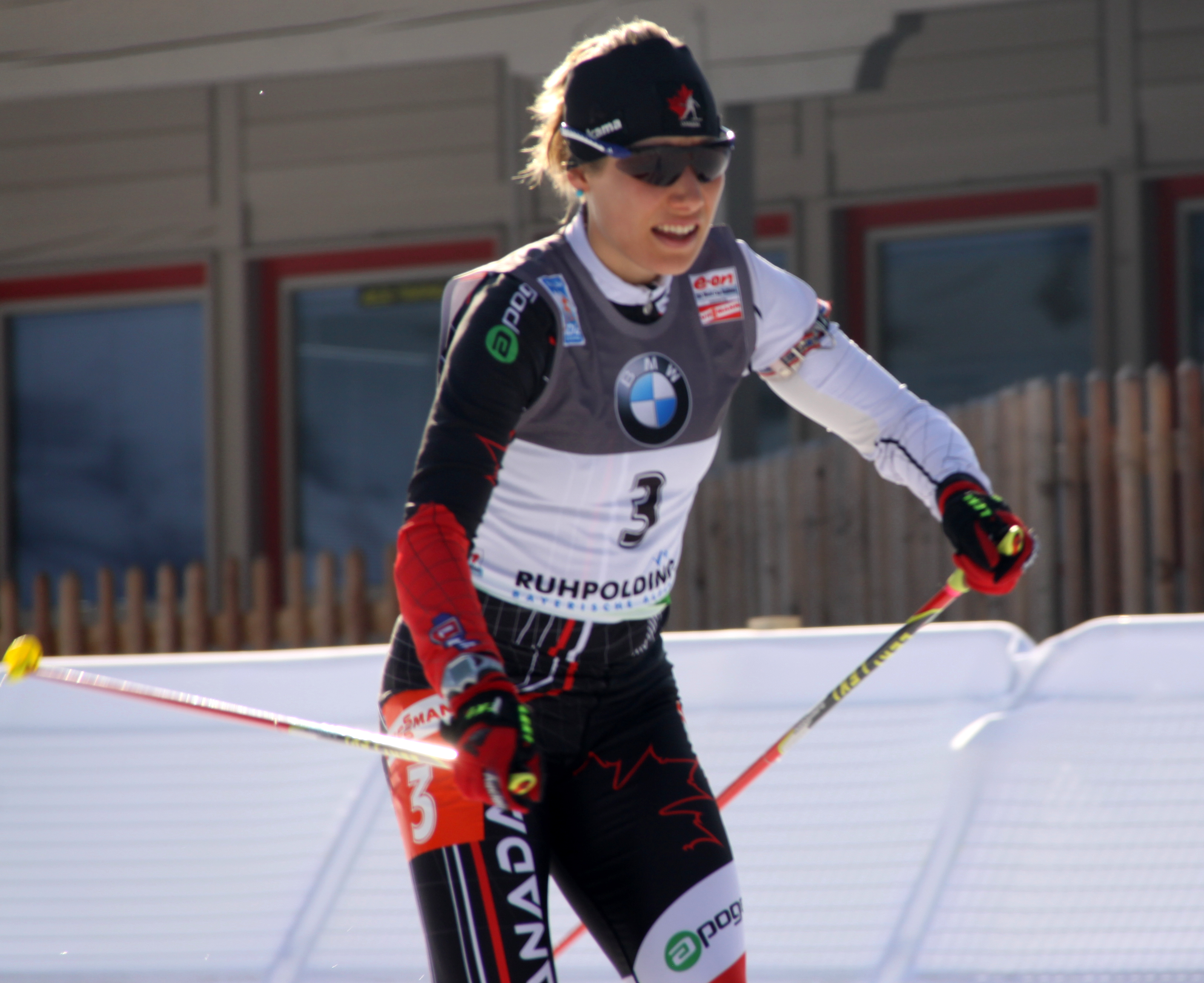
Zina Kocher

Zina Kocher (born December 5, 1982, in Red Deer, Alberta) is a Canadian cross-country skier and former biathlete. She competed for Team Canada in biathlon at the 2006, 2010, 2014 Winter Olympics and in 12 editions of the Biathlon World Championships.

== Career ==
Kocher started out competing as a cross-country skier, and was introduced to the sport of biathlon at the 1998 Alberta Winter Games. After graduating from high school in 2000, she moved to Canmore to train full-time. She subsequently was selected to compete for Canada at the 2001 Junior World Championships, before embarking on her first full-time Biathlon World Cup campaign in the 2003-04 season, during which she took five top 30 finishes.

In the opening race of the 2006-07 season, a 15 km individual competition in Östersund, Sweden, Kocher finished third, becoming the first Canadian biathlete to make the podium in a top-level international event since Myriam Bédard ten years earlier. After a two-year period where she struggled with illness, Kocher took a fourth place in a pursuit at the third meeting of the 2009–10 season in Pokljuka, Slovenia, shooting 20 out of 20 targets in an event for the first time, having already taken a tenth place in the sprint at the same meeting. At the 2014 Winter Olympics in Sochi, Russia, she was part of the Canadian team that finished eighth in the women's relay, the best ever Canadian finish in that event.

Kocher retired from biathlon competition in March 2016, and by January 2017 she had enrolled as a student of massage therapy at Mount Royal University. She subsequently competed in the 2017 national cross-country ski championships in Canmore: having trained on a part-time basis, she won the 5 km competition and finished second in the 30 km event, in a field containing members of the Canadian national cross-country ski team. She subsequently decided to switch to part-time studies and return to competition as a cross-country skier with the aim of being selected for the 2018 Winter Olympics, partly in memory of Richard Boruta, her former biathlon coach, who had been killed in a climbing accident in August 2017. Kocher won the 51 km freestyle race at the Gatineau Loppet in February 2018.

== Bold Beautiful Biathlon ==
She was part of a group of five athletes (along with Canadian biathletes Megan Tandy, Sandra Keith, Rosanna Crawford, and Megan Imrie), who posed for the Bold Beautiful Biathlon calendar. Although Zina Kocher was one of the few fully funded athletes in the national biathlon program, she took the initiative to find opportunities for extra funding. Kocher felt the calendar would build a new image for young Canadian girls to look up to; the image of a healthy, athletic body. The nude photos were taken by Rachel Boekel and Adrian Marcoux in Canmore, Alberta. The concept was that each athlete will be featured on two pages of the calendar, and there will be four group photos. The calendar was called Bold Beautiful Biathlon, and sold for $25. The biathletes were inspired by a calendar that was done featuring Olympic cross-country skiers, Sara Renner and Beckie Scott in 2001. Renner and Scott, along with three other teammates, tastefully took their clothes off for a calendar to raise funds.

== Personal life ==
Kocher married Alex Lawson in the summer of 2017. She is a trained doula.

== See also ==
- List of Canadian sports personalities
