= 2011–12 Biathlon World Cup – World Cup 9 =

Coordinates: 61°00′N 69°01′E

The 2011–12 Biathlon World Cup – World Cup 9 was held in Khanty-Mansiysk, Russia, from 16 March until 18 March 2012.

== Schedule of events ==
Date	Time	Events
March 16	11:00 CET	Men's 10 km Sprint
March 16	13:30 CET	Women's 7.5 km Sprint
March 17	11:30 CET	Men's 12.5 km Pursuit
March 17	13:45 CET	Women's 10 km Pursuit
March 18	11:30 CET	Men's 15 km Mass Start
March 18	12:45 CET	Women's 12.5 km Mass Start

== Medal winners ==
=== Men ===
Event:	Gold:	Time	Silver:	Time	Bronze:	Time
10 km Sprint details	Martin Fourcade; France	26:40.2 (0+0)	Arnd Peiffer; Germany	26:45.5 (0+1)	Fredrik Lindström; Sweden	26:46.9 (0+0)
12.5 km Pursuit details	Martin Fourcade; France	34:47.1 (0+0+1+0)	Arnd Peiffer; Germany	35:06.7 (0+0+0+1)	Emil Hegle Svendsen; Norway	35:21.8 (1+1+0+0)
15 km Mass Start details	Emil Hegle Svendsen; Norway	43:15.7 (0+1+0+1)	Arnd Peiffer; Germany	43:39.2 (1+1+1+1)	Anton Shipulin; Russia	43:47.5 (0+0+2+0)

=== Women ===
Event:	Gold:	Time	Silver:	Time	Bronze:	Time
7.5 km Sprint details	Magdalena Neuner; Germany	22:11.5 (1+1)	Vita Semerenko; Ukraine	22:14.7 (0+0)	Darya Domracheva; Belarus	22:27.7 (0+1)
10 km Pursuit details	Darya Domracheva; Belarus	32:44.5 (0+1+1+0)	Kaisa Mäkäräinen; Finland	33:09.3 (1+1+0+0)	Vita Semerenko; Ukraine	33:16.6 (0+0+1+1)
12.5 km Mass Start details	Darya Domracheva; Belarus	39:01.4 (1+0+0+2)	Tora Berger; Norway	39:11.4 (0+0+0+1)	Kaisa Mäkäräinen; Finland	39:34.0 (2+0+1+1)

== Achievements ==
Best performance for all time

- Simon Kocevar (SLO), 69th place in Sprint
- Arturs Kolesnikovs (LAT), 81st place in Sprint
- Benedikt Doll (GER), 28th place in Pursuit
- Nathan Smith (CAN), 38th place in Pursuit
- Sergey Klyachin (RUS), 46th place in Pursuit
- Milanko Petrovic (SRB), 50th place in Pursuit
- Florian Graf (GER), 5th place in Mass Start
- Juliya Dzhyma (UKR), 17th place in Sprint
- Tiril Eckhoff (NOR), 24th place in Sprint, 20th in Pursuit and 7th in Mass Start
- Marina Korovina (RUS), 24th place in Pursuit
- Maren Hammerschmidt (GER), 26th place in Pursuit
- Aleksandra Alikina (RUS), 37th place in Pursuit

First World Cup race

- Benedikt Doll (GER), 32nd place in Sprint
- Sergey Klyachin (RUS), 48th place in Sprint
- Marina Korovina (RUS), 33rd place in Sprint
- Maren Hammerschmidt (GER), 34th place in Sprint
- Aleksandra Alikina (RUS), 39th place in Sprint
