= Anna Maria Uusitalo =

Swedish biathlete

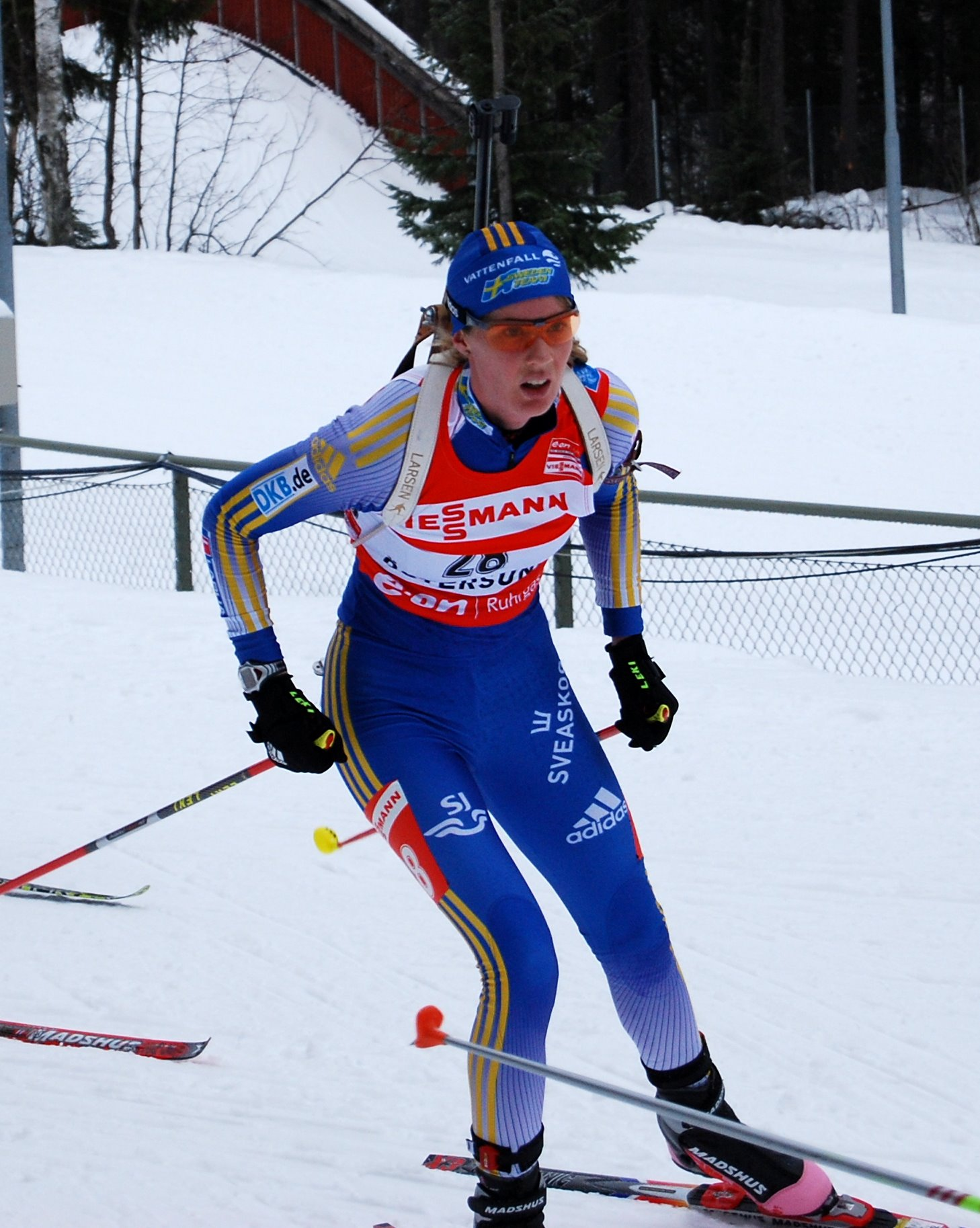
- Anna Maria Uusitalo competing for Sweden during the IBU World Biathlon Championships in Östersund, Sweden in February 2008

Personal information
- Nationality: Swedish
- Born: 13 May 1983 (age 43) Östersund, Sweden

Sport

Anna Maria Uusitalo (née Anna Maria Nilsson, born 13 May 1983 in Östersund, Sweden) is a Swedish former biathlete. She represented Sweden at the 2010 Winter Olympics in Vancouver. On 24 April 2012 Uusitalo officially announced her retirement from biathlon.
