= Natalya Otchenash =

Ukrainian biathlete (born 1983)

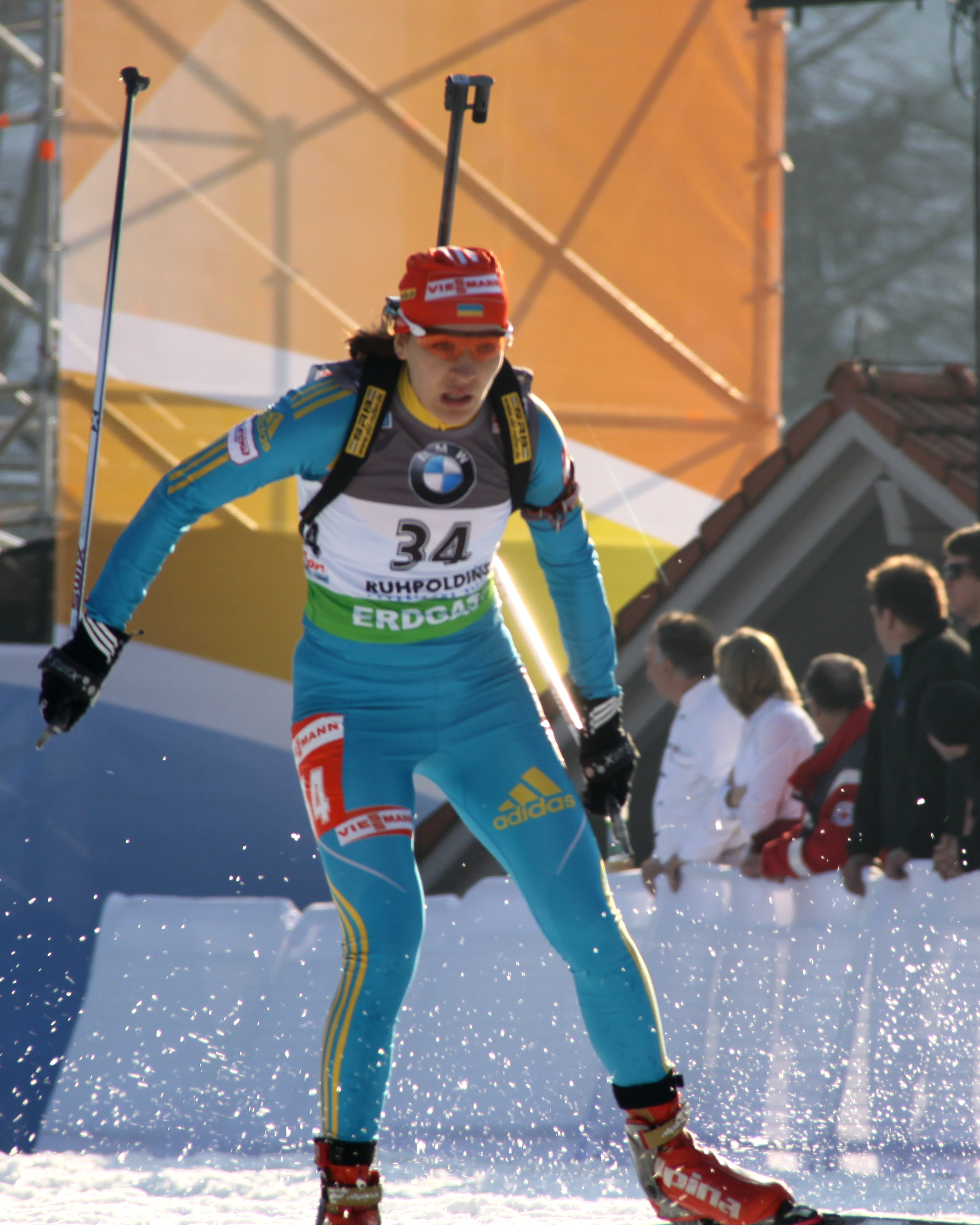

Personal information
- Born: 26 October 1983 (age 42) Chaykovsky, Russia
- Height: 1.65 m (5 ft 5 in)

Sport
- Sport: Skiing
- Club: Dynamo, Kharkiv

World Cup career
- Seasons: 2001–2009 (for Russia); 2010–2016 (for Ukraine)
- Indiv. podiums: 1
- Indiv. wins: 0
Medal record
Women's biathlon
Representing Ukraine
European Championships
| Gold medal – first place | 2015 Otepää | Relay |
Representing Russia
European Championships
| Gold medal – first place | 2003 Forni Avoltri | Junior sprint |
| Gold medal – first place | 2003 Forni Avoltri | Junior pursuit |
| Gold medal – first place | 2003 Forni Avoltri | Junior 3 x 6 km Relay |
| Gold medal – first place | 2004 Minsk | Junior 3 x 6 km Relay |
| Silver medal – second place | 2004 Minsk | Junior individual |
- Updated on May 13, 2016

Natalya Otchenash (Ukrainian: Наталія Отченаш, romanized: Natalya Otchenash, née Natalya Burdyga (Ukrainian: Наталія Леонідівна Бурдига, romanized: Natalya Leonidivna Burdyga; born 26 October 1983), is a retired Russian-Ukrainian biathlete. In May 2015 she decided to retire, but in December 2015 she came back and performed at the Biathlon World Cup Stage #1 in Sweden. This was her last season - after it she announced about retirement due to family reasons.

== Personal life ==
Since April 2017, Natalya Otčenáš has been married to former Slovak biathlete Martin Otčenáš.

== Performances ==
| Level | Year | Event | IN | SP | PU | MS | RL | MRL |
Representing Russia
| EBCH | 2003 | Forni Avoltri, Italy | | 1 | 1 | | 1 | |
| JBWCH | 2004 | Maurienne, France | 40 | 16 | DNS | | | |
| EBCH | 2004 | Minsk, Belarus | 2 | 4 | 4 | | 1 | |
| EBCH | 2009 | Ufa, Russia | 17 | 9 | 13 | | | |
Representing Ukraine
| BWCH | 2011 | Khanty-Mansiysk, Russia | 18 | | | | | |
| BWCH | 2012 | Ruhpolding, Germany | 12 | 49 | DNS | | 6 | 14 |
| BWCH | 2013 | Nové Město na Moravě, Czech Republic | | | | | | 9 |
| OLY | 2014 | Sochi, Russia | | | | | | 7 |
| EBCH | 2015 | Otepää, Estonia | | 20 | | | 1 | |

=== World Cup ===
==== Podiums ====
| Season | Place | Competition | Placement |
Representing Ukraine
| 2011–12 | Kontiolahti, Finland | Mixed relay | 2 |
| 2014–15 | Antholz, Italy | Relay | 3 |
| 2015–16 | Presque Isle, United States | Relay | 2 |

==== Positions ====
| Season | Individual | Sprint | Pursuit | Mass starts | TOTAL |
Representing Russia
| 2009–10 | 40 | 82 | 58 | | 64 |
Representing Ukraine
| 2010–11 | 37 | 52 | 33 | | 45 |
| 2011–12 | 18 | 23 | 22 | 25 | 21 |
| 2012–13 | | 49 | 46 | 43 | 49 |
| 2013–14 | 51 | 43 | 45 | 26 | 38 |
| 2014–15 | 57 | 42 | 41 | 34 | 43 |
