= Megan Imrie =

Canadian biathlete

Personal information
- Full name: Megan Imrie
- Born: 14 February 1986 (age 40) Falcon Lake, Canada
- Website: MeganImrie.com

Sport

Professional information
- Sport: Biathlon
- Club: Falcon Sports Club
- World Cup debut: 29 November 2007

Olympic Games
- Teams: 2 (2010, 2014)
- Medals: 0

World Championships
- Teams: 3 (2008, 2009, 2012)
- Medals: 0

World Cup
- Seasons: 7 (2007/08–2013/14)
- All podiums: 0

Megan Imrie (born 14 February 1986) is a Canadian former biathlete who is also active in rodeo and long-distance running. She competed for Canada at the 2010 Winter Olympics and the 2014 Winter Olympics.

Along with Canadian biathletes Zina Kocher, Sandra Keith, Rosanna Crawford, and Megan Tandy, she posed for the Bold Beautiful Biathlon calendar to raise money to cover annual expenses for training and competition.

Imrie retired from the sport at the end of the 2013–14 season.
