= Andrei Makoveev =

Russian biathlete

Andrei Makoveev (born 16 October 1982) is a retired Russian biathlete. His best result at the Biathlon World Championships 2011 was in the sprint, where he placed fourth behind Peiffer, Fourcade and Bø.

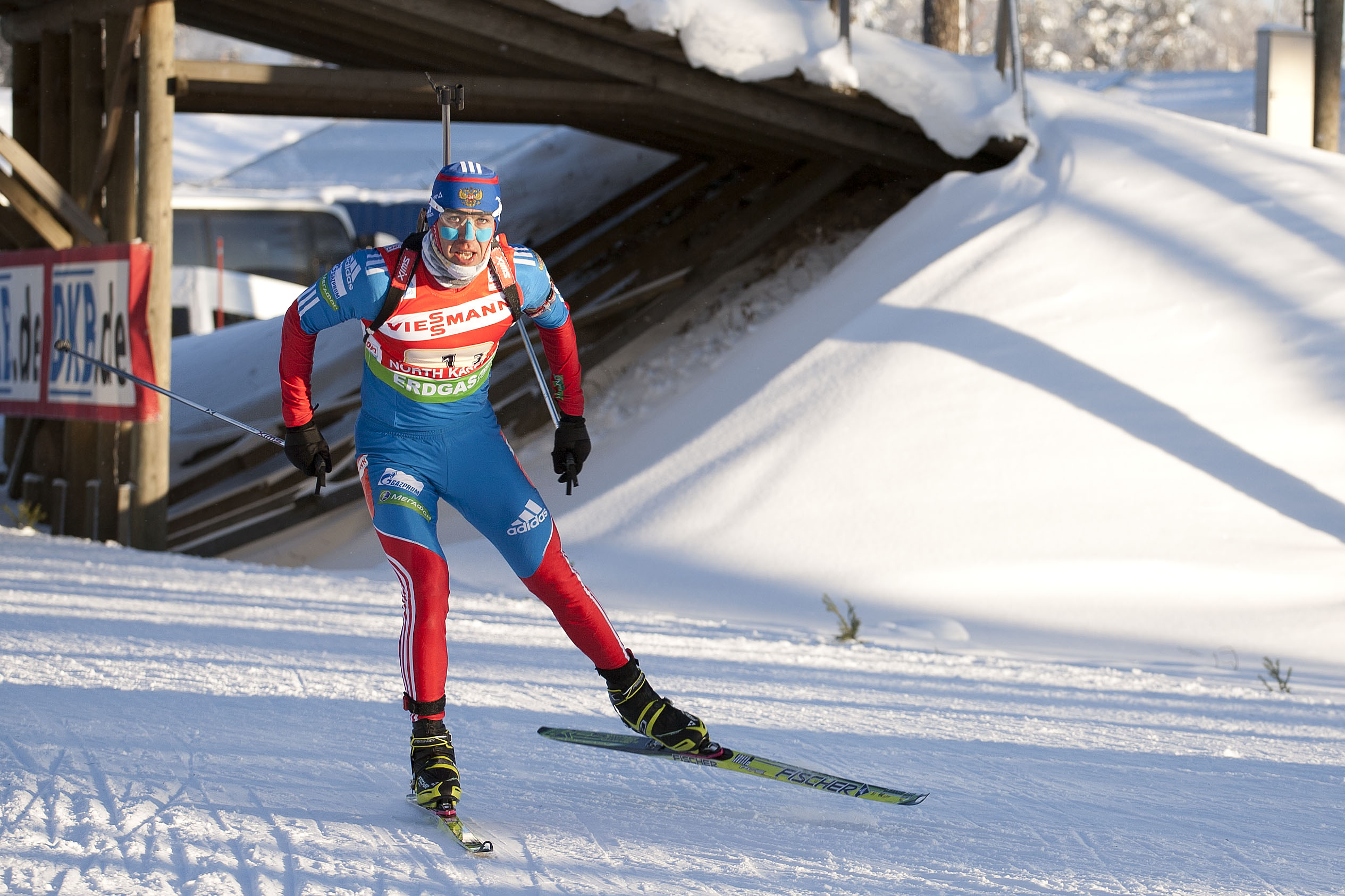
Kontiolahti, Finland, 10 February 2012
