= Nastassia Kinnunen =

Belarusian cross-country skier (born 1985)

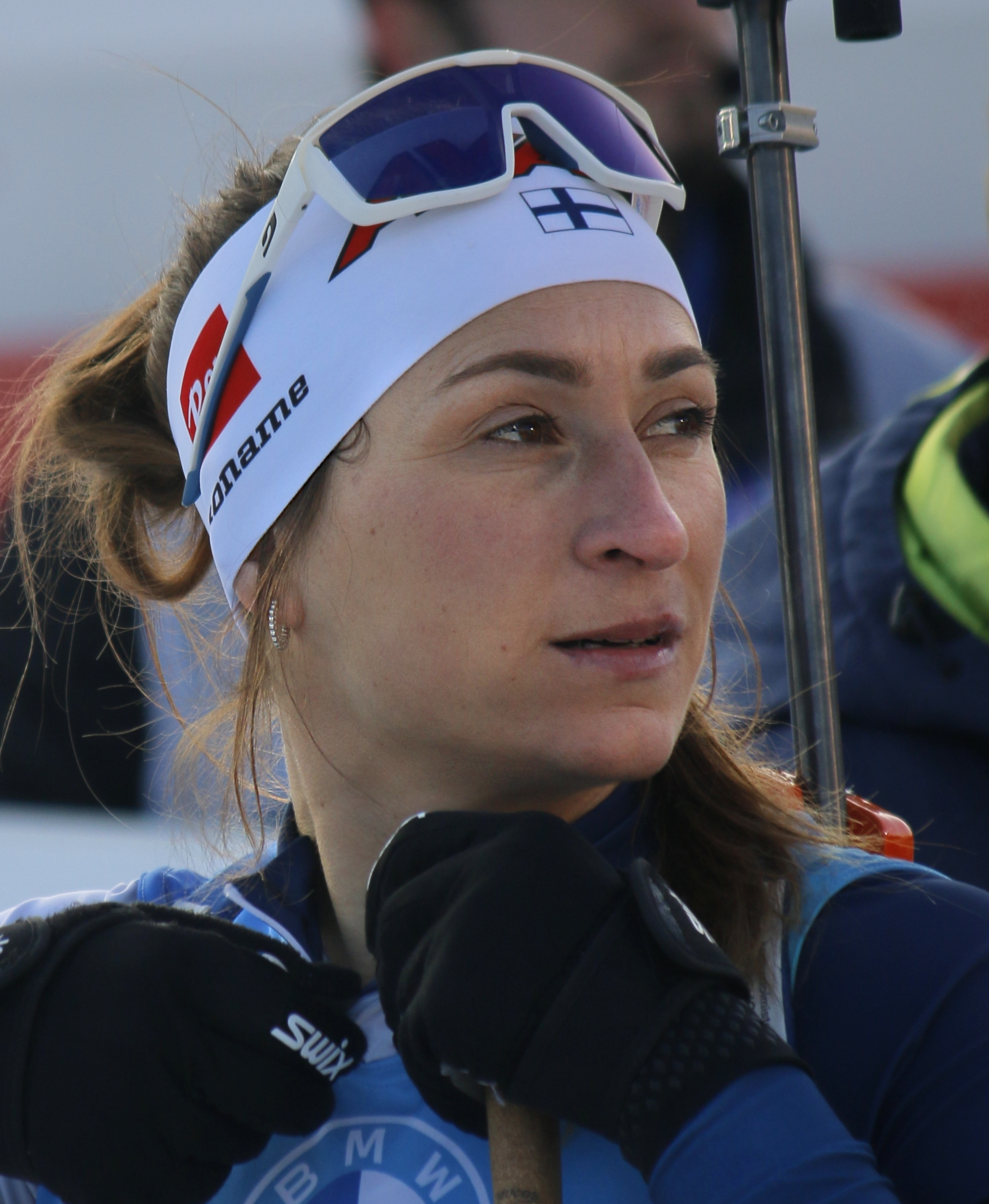
- Kinnunen in 2023

Personal information
- Nationality: Belarus; Finland
- Born: 14 March 1985 (age 41) Haradok, Vitebsk Oblast, Belarus SSR, Soviet Union
- Height: 1.71 m (5 ft 7 in)
- Weight: 63 kg (139 lb)

Sport

Professional information
- Sport: Biathlon
- World Cup debut: 10 December 2010

Nastassia Kinnunen (née Dubarezava; born 14 March 1985) is a Finnish former biathlete and cross-country skier. At the 2010 Winter Olympics in Vancouver, she finished 11th in the 4 x 5 km relay, 42nd in the individual sprint, 45th in the 30 km, and 54th in the 7.5 km + 7.5 km double pursuit.

At the FIS Nordic World Ski Championships 2009 in Liberec, Dubarezava finished 41st in the 30 km, 55th in the 7.5 km + 7.5 km double pursuit, and 60th both in the individual sprint and the 10 km events.

Her best World Cup finish was 7th for Finland in the 4 x 5 km relay in Kontiolahti (2022) while her best individual finish was a 19th place in her final race ever, an individual sprint event in Oslo, Norway in 2023.

== Personal life ==
Born in Haradok, Belarusian SSR, Kinnunen moved to Finland in 2017, and she received Finnish citizenship in 2020. She has a daughter with her Finnish husband.

== Biathlon results ==
All results are sourced from the International Biathlon Union.

=== Olympic Games ===
0 medals

Event	Individual	Sprint	Pursuit	Mass start	Relay	Mixed relay
(China) 2022 Beijing	51st	75th	—	—	16th	—

=== World Championships ===
0 medals

Event	Individual	Sprint	Pursuit	Mass start	Relay	Mixed relay	Single Mixed relay
(Slovenia) 2021 Pokljuka	—	80th	—	—	14th	—	—
(Germany) 2023 Oberhof	60th	61st	—	—	13th	—	—

*During Olympic seasons competitions are only held for those events not included in the Olympic program.
