= Sophie Boilley =

French biathlete (born 1989)

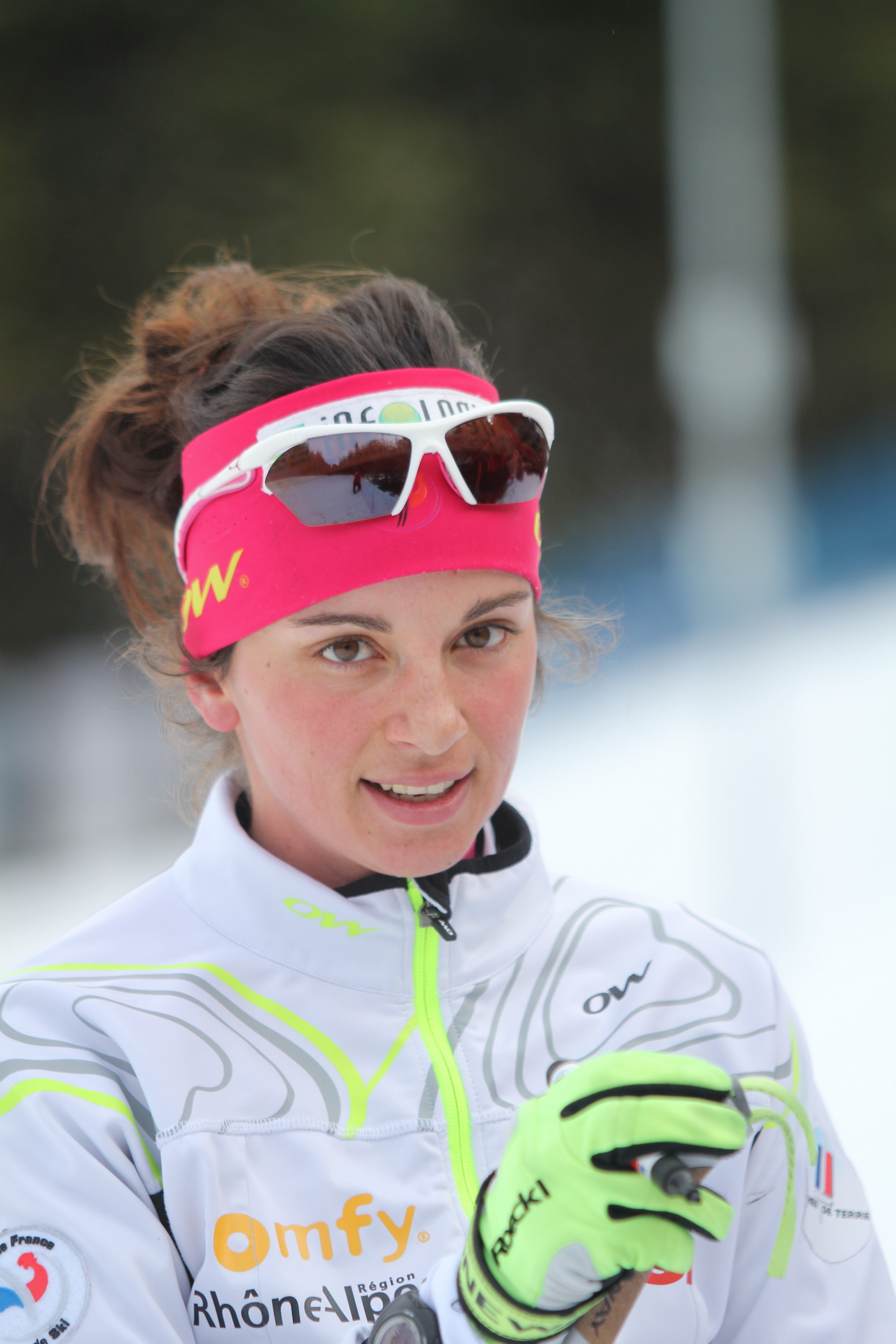

Personal information
- Born: 18 December 1989 (age 36) Valence, Drôme, France

Sport

World Championships
- Teams: 3 (2011, 2012, 2013)
- Medals: 2

World Cup
- Seasons: 5 (2010/11–2014/15)
- All victories: 2
Medal record
Representing France
Women's biathlon
World Championships
Silver medal – second place	2011 Khanty-Mansiysk	4 × 6 km relay
Silver medal – second place	2012 Ruhpolding	4 × 6 km relay
Junior World Championships
Gold medal – first place	2010 Torsby	10 km pursuit
Silver medal – second place	2010 Torsby	7.5 km sprint
Bronze medal – third place	2009 Canmore	7.5 km sprint
Youth World Championships
Silver medal – second place	2008 Ruhpolding	7.5 km pursuit

Sophie Boilley (born 18 December 1989) is a retired French biathlete and soldier.

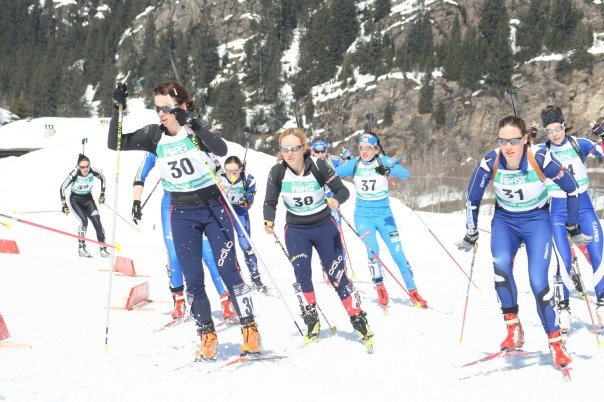
Sophie Boilley (N° 30) in 2009

Boilley was born in Valence, Drôme. She competed at the Biathlon World Championships 2011, and won a silver medal in the relay with the French team.

== Biathlon results ==
=== World Championships ===
2 medals (2 silver)

Event	Individual	Sprint	Pursuit	Mass start	Relay	Mixed relay
(Russia) 2011 Khanty-Mansiysk	49th	33rd	38th	—	Silver	—
(Germany) 2012 Ruhpolding	27th	40th	45th	—	Silver	—
(Czech Republic) 2013 Nové Město	45th	16th	28th	—	6th	—

=== World Cup ===
Relay victories

2 victories

No.	Season	Date	Location	Discipline	Level	Team
1	2011–12	21 January 2012	(Italy) Antholz-Anterselva	Relay	Biathlon World Cup	Brunet / Boilley / Bescond / Dorin Habert
2	2011–12	10 February 2012	(Finland) Kontiolahti	Mixed Relay	Biathlon World Cup	Boilley / Bescond / Béatrix / Jay
