= 2011–12 Biathlon World Cup – Sprint Men =

Sports event in the 2011-12 Biathlon World Cup

The 2011–12 Biathlon World Cup – Sprint Men will start at Friday December 2, 2011 in Östersund and will finish Friday March 16, 2012 in Khanty-Mansiysk. Defending titlist is Tarjei Bø of Norway.

== Competition format ==
The 10 kilometres (6,23 mi) sprint race is the third oldest biathlon event; the distance is skied over three laps. The biathlete shoots two times at any shooting lane, first prone, then standing, totalling 10 targets. For each missed target the biathlete has to complete a penalty lap of around 150 metres. Competitors' starts are staggered, normally by 30 seconds.

== 2010-11 Top 3 Standings ==
Medal	Athlete	Points
Gold:	(Norway) Tarjei Bø	393
Silver:	(Norway) Emil Hegle Svendsen	369
Bronze:	(Germany) Arnd Peiffer	333

== Medal winners ==
Event:	Gold:	Time	Silver:	Time	Bronze:	Time
Östersund details	Carl Johan Bergman; Sweden	24:22.5 (0+0)	Tarjei Bø; Norway	24:30.1 (0+0)	Emil Hegle Svendsen; Norway	24:35.5 (0+1)
Hochfilzen details	Carl Johan Bergman; Sweden	24:41.9 (0+0)	Andrei Makoveev; Russia	24:51.1 (0+0)	Benjamin Weger; Switzerland	25:01.5 (0+0)
Hochfilzen (2) details	Tarjei Bø; Norway	23:57.2 (1+0)	Martin Fourcade; France	24:01.2 (1+1)	Timofey Lapshin; Russia	24:14.4 (0+0)
Oberhof details	Arnd Peiffer; Germany	25:57.5 (1+0)	Simon Fourcade; France	25:58.6 (0+0)	Evgeny Ustyugov; Russia	26:02.3 (0+0)
Nové Město details	Emil Hegle Svendsen; Norway	27:13.1 (0+1)	Simon Fourcade; France	27:15.8 (1+2)	Martin Fourcade; France	27:22.7 (1+1)
Antholz details	Fredrik Lindström; Sweden	24:37.9 (0+0)	Evgeniy Garanichev; Russia	24:56.1 (0+0)	Martin Fourcade; France	24:57.0 (0+0)
Holmenkollen details	Evgeniy Garanichev; Russia	25:22.2 (0+0)	Arnd Peiffer; Germany	25:22.9 (0+0)	Emil Hegle Svendsen; Norway	25:34.0 (0+2)
Kontiolahti details	Martin Fourcade; France	24:58.2 (0+1)	Timofey Lapshin; Russia	24:59.0 (0+0)	Benjamin Weger; Switzerland	24:59.8 (0+0)
Biathlon World Championships 2012 details	Martin Fourcade; France	24:18.6 (1+1)	Emil Hegle Svendsen; Norway	24:33.7 (1+1)	Carl Johan Bergman; Sweden	24:36.3 (0+0)
Khanty-Mansiysk details	Martin Fourcade; France	26:40.2 (0+0)	Arnd Peiffer; Germany	26:45.5 (0+1)	Fredrik Lindström; Sweden	26:46.9 (0+0)

== Standings ==
#	Name	ÖST	HOC1	HOC2	OBE	NOV	ANT	HOL	KON	WCH	KHA	Total
1	Martin Fourcade (FRA)	43	19	54	—	48	48	31	60	60	60	423
2	Emil Hegle Svendsen (NOR)	48	43	0	38	60	18	48	29	54	40	378
3	Carl Johan Bergman (SWE)	60	60	0	34	34	4	15	—	48	32	287
4	Arnd Peiffer (GER)	8	23	0	60	27	40	54	—	4	54	270
5	Andrei Makoveev (RUS)	0	54	24	40	40	28	18	26	8	23	261
6	Tarjei Bø (NOR)	54	38	60	—	21	1	13	0	24	38	249
7	Evgeny Ustyugov (RUS)	0	40	28	48	28	38	36	—	11	19	248
8	Andreas Birnbacher (GER)	38	30	15	17	31	43	29	—	25	20	248
9	Fredrik Lindström (SWE)	19	0	3	30	36	60	—	1	38	48	235
10	Simon Fourcade (FRA)	0	15	38	54	54	20	0	10	40	0	231
11	Lowell Bailey (USA)	40	27	20	0	20	5	34	40	21	21	228
12	Evgeniy Garanichev (RUS)	0	11	—	—	22	54	60	22	29	26	224
13	Michal Šlesingr (CZE)	34	29	0	32	24	27	27	7	16	28	224
14	Tim Burke (USA)	29	0	0	5	30	29	26	28	31	43	221
15	Benjamin Weger (SUI)	28	48	14	26	2	31	16	48	5	—	218
16	Björn Ferry (SWE)	15	34	22	19	0	36	—	23	36	18	203
17	Anton Shipulin (RUS)	11	26	0	14	43	34	—	31	28	14	201
18	Ole Einar Bjørndalen (NOR)	32	22	26	—	16	0	40	43	20	0	199
19	Alexis Bœuf (FRA)	23	32	23	0	25	13	43	0	32	0	191
20	Dmitry Malyshko (RUS)	—	31	0	28	32	0	19	36	—	30	176
21	Jakov Fak (SLO)	0	0	36	0	0	32	38	—	30	31	167
22	Florian Graf (GER)	21	36	18	36	0	16	24	—	7	0	158
23	Lukas Hofer (ITA)	13	12	0	43	7	31	—	30	10	5	151
24	Timofey Lapshin (RUS)	—	18	48	25	—	—	0	54	—	2	147
25	Daniel Mesotitsch (AUT)	17	28	0	27	0	6	4	0	43	0	125
26	Klemen Bauer (SLO)	0	0	25	31	0	0	22	17	0	29	124
27	Jean-Guillaume Béatrix (FRA)	—	—	43	16	1	22	7	8	0	25	122
28	Simon Schempp (GER)	6	9	43	22	8	—	6	—	22	0	116
29	Markus Windisch (ITA)	0	20	0	0	0	0	11	27	34	16	108
30	Jay Hakkinen (USA)	2	0	0	13	10	19	17	25	0	22	108
31	Simon Hallenbarter (SUI)	0	0	1	—	0	25	28	0	17	36	107
32	Ondřej Moravec (CZE)	0	0	0	0	18	15	23	14	23	12	105
33	Jean-Philippe Leguellec (CAN)	0	0	0	—	6	14	21	—	27	34	102
34	Christoph Sumann (AUT)	20	17	19	12	0	—	0	34	0	0	102
35	Brendan Green (CAN)	27	7	17	—	9	7	32	—	—	—	99
36	Simon Eder (AUT)	3	25	27	15	0	3	20	—	0	—	93
37	Serhiy Semenov (UKR)	7	4	2	18	—	8	—	5	19	24	87
38	Michael Greis (GER)	25	21	0	—	—	9	—	—	15	15	85
39	Artem Pryma (UKR)	—	—	—	23	15	21	—	—	6	17	82
40	Russell Currier (USA)	—	—	—	—	38	0	—	38	0	4	80
41	Krasimir Anev (BUL)	0	10	9	29	0	24	—	0	0	8	80
42	Lars Berger (NOR)	30	3	12	20	5	0	0	—	9	—	79
43	Aleksey Volkov (RUS)	0	—	34	0	23	11	—	4	—	—	72
44	Rune Brattsveen (NOR)	9	13	—	0	—	—	25	21	—	0	68
45	Jaroslav Soukup (CZE)	36	0	16	0	12	0	0	0	0	0	64
46	Serguei Sednev (UKR)	0	0	0	8	14	26	—	15	0	0	63
47	Sven Grossegger (AUT)	31	0	29	0	0	0	0	—	—	0	60
48	Michail Kletcherov (BUL)	0	24	0	0	0	23	0	12	0	0	59
49	Dominik Landertinger (AUT)	16	0	10	0	0	0	8	—	13	6	53
50	Magnús Jónsson (SWE)	10	0	0	—	29	—	12	0	0	—	51
51	Michael Rösch (GER)	—	14	0	24	—	0	0	13	—	—	51
52	Dušan Šimočko (SVK)	24	0	0	—	0	0	—	—	26	0	50
53	Vincent Jay (FRA)	0	0	32	0	13	0	2	0	—	—	47
54	Daniel Böhm (GER)	—	—	—	10	3	—	—	32	—	0	45
55	Christian De Lorenzi (ITA)	0	—	—	0	0	0	30	0	0	13	43
56	Indrek Tobreluts (EST)	0	0	4	2	11	—	—	24	0	0	41
57	Matej Kazar (SVK)	0	0	6	6	0	—	0	6	12	10	40
58	Rene Laurent Vuillermoz (ITA)	—	—	—	—	—	17	0	20	—	—	37
59	Sergey Novikov (BLR)	—	0	0	9	0	10	0	0	18	0	37
60	Andriy Deryzemlya (UKR)	0	0	0	4	0	0	—	3	0	27	34
61	Tomáš Holubec (CZE)	0	0	32	0	0	0	0	—	—	—	32
62	Martin Eng (NOR)	—	—	30	1	—	—	—	—	—	0	31
63	Zdeněk Vítek (CZE)	5	16	0	—	0	0	9	—	0	0	30
64	Vasja Rupnik (SLO)	0	0	0	0	26	2	0	0	0	0	28
65	Henrik L'Abée-Lund (NOR)	—	—	—	21	0	—	—	—	—	7	28
66	Daniel Graf (GER)	26	—	—	—	—	—	1	0	—	—	27
67	Dominik Windisch (ITA)	18	5	0	3	0	0	—	0	0	—	26
68	Scott Perras (CAN)	0	0	0	—	0	12	14	—	0	0	26
69	Friedrich Pinter (AUT)	22	0	0	0	0	0	—	—	—	3	25
70	Vladimir Iliev (BUL)	0	0	21	0	0	0	—	0	0	1	22
71	Aliaksandr Babchyn (BLR)	4	0	0	—	0	0	0	17	0	0	21
72	Olexander Bilanenko (UKR)	0	0	13	7	0	—	0	—	—	—	20
73	Kauri Kõiv (EST)	0	0	0	0	19	0	—	0	0	0	19
74	Christian Stebler (SUI)	—	—	—	0	—	0	0	19	0	0	19
75	Erik Lesser (GER)	—	—	—	—	0	—	—	18	—	0	18
76	Pavol Hurajt (SVK)	—	—	0	0	17	0	0	0	0	0	17
77	Ivan Joller (SUI)	0	1	5	—	0	0	10	0	1	—	17
78	Yan Savitskiy (KAZ)	—	0	—	—	0	0	—	—	14	—	14
79	Evgeny Abramenko (BLR)	14	0	0	0	0	—	0	0	—	0	14
80	Lars Helge Birkeland (NOR)	12	0	—	—	—	0	0	0	—	0	12
81	Andrejs Rastorgujevs (LAT)	0	0	0	0	—	0	—	0	0	11	11
82	Roman Pryma (UKR)	0	0	0	—	—	0	0	11	—	—	11
83	Yuryi Liadov (BLR)	0	—	—	11	—	0	0	0	0	0	11
84	Sergey Naumik (KAZ)	—	—	11	—	0	0	—	—	0	—	11
85	Oleg Berezhnoy (UKR)	—	—	—	—	0	—	0	9	—	—	9
86	Benedikt Doll (GER)	—	—	—	—	—	—	—	—	—	9	9
87	Vladimir Alenishko (BLR)	—	0	8	0	0	0	—	—	0	—	8
88	Tomasz Sikora (POL)	0	8	0	0	0	0	—	—	0	0	8
89	Janez Marič (SLO)	0	6	0	0	0	0	0	0	2	—	8
90	Mario Dolder (SUI)	—	—	7	0	—	—	—	—	—	—	7
91	Ahti Toivanen (FIN)	0	0	0	0	4	0	—	2	0	0	6
92	Ted Armgren (SWE)	—	—	—	0	0	0	5	0	—	—	5
93	Junji Nagai (JPN)	0	0	0	0	—	0	0	0	3	—	3
94	Maksim Burtasov (RUS)	0	—	—	—	—	—	3	—	—	0	3
95	Alexsandr Chervyhkov (KAZ)	1	2	0	—	—	—	—	—	0	—	3
96	Lois Habert (FRA)	0	0	0	1	0	0	—	—	—	—	1
