= 2011–12 Biathlon World Cup – Relay Men =

The 2011–12 Biathlon World Cup – Relay Men will start at Sunday December 11, 2011 in Hochfilzen and will finish Friday March 9, 2012 in Ruhpolding at Biathlon World Championships 2012 event. Defending titlist is Norwegian team.

== Competition format ==
The relay teams consist of four biathletes, who each ski 7.5 kilometres (4.7 mi), each leg skied over three laps, with two shooting rounds; one prone, one standing. For every round of five targets there are eight bullets available, though the last three can only be single-loaded manually one at a time from spare round holders or bullets deposited by the competitor into trays or onto the mat at the firing line. If after eight bullets there are still misses, one 150 m penalty loop must be taken for each missed target remaining. The first-leg participants start all at the same time, and as in cross-country skiing relays, every athlete of a team must touch the team's next-leg participant to perform a valid changeover. On the first shooting stage of the first leg, the participant must shoot in the lane corresponding to their bib number (Bib #10 shoots at lane #10 regardless of position in race.), then for the remainder of the relay, the relay team shoots at the lane in the position they arrived (Arrive at the range in 5th place, you shoot at lane five.).

== 2010–11 Top 3 Standings ==
Medal	Country	Points
Gold:	Norway	216
Silver:	Germany	199
Bronze:	Ukraine	163

== Medal winners ==
Event:	Gold:	Time	Silver:	Time	Bronze:	Time
Hochfilzen details	Norway; Rune Brattsveen; Lars Berger; Emil Hegle Svendsen; Tarjei Bø	1:14:52.9 (0+1) (0+3) (0+0) (1+3) (0+0) (0+0) (0+0) (0+0)	Russia; Anton Shipulin; Andrei Makoveev; Evgeny Ustyugov; Dimitry Malyshko	1:15:06.8 (0+0) (0+0) (0+0) (0+1) (0+1) (0+1) (0+2) (0+0)	France; Vincent Jay; Simon Fourcade; Alexis Bœuf; Martin Fourcade	1:15:23.9 (0+0) (0+2) (0+0) (0+0) (0+1) (0+0) (0+2) (0+1)
Oberhof details	Italy; Christian de Lorenzi; Markus Windisch; Dominik Windisch; Lukas Hofer	1:30:49.1 (0+0) (0+1) (0+0) (0+1) (0+1) (0+1) (0+0) (0+1)	Russia; Anton Shipulin; Evgeniy Garanichev; Evgeny Ustyugov; Alexey Volkov	1:30:55.2 (0+0) (0+2) (0+2) (0+3) (0+0) (2+3) (0+2) (0+1)	Sweden; Tobias Arwidson; Björn Ferry; Fredrik Lindström; Carl Johan Bergman	1:31:21.8 (0+0) (0+0) (0+0) (0+1) (0+0) (0+1) (0+3) (0+1)
Antholtz details	France; Jean-Guillaume Béatrix; Simon Fourcade; Alexis Bœuf; Martin Fourcade	1:12:14.7 (0+1) (0+0) (0+1) (0+2) (0+0) (0+1) (0+1) (0+1)	Germany; Michael Rösch; Andreas Birnbacher; Florian Graf; Arnd Peiffer	1:12:26.7 (0+1) (0+1) (0+0) (0+2) (0+1) (0+1) (0+0) (1+3)	Austria; Simon Eder; Tobias Eberhard; Daniel Mesotitsch; Dominik Landertinger	1:12:56.4 (0+0) (0+1) (0+0) (0+2) (0+1) (0+3) (0+1) (0+1)
World Championships 2012 details	Norway; Ole Einar Bjørndalen; Rune Brattsveen; Tarjei Bø; Emil Hegle Svendsen	1:17:26.8 (0+0) (1+3) (0+0) (0+2) (0+1) (0+1) (0+0) (0+0)	France; Jean-Guillaume Béatrix; Simon Fourcade; Alexis Bœuf; Martin Fourcade	1:17:56.5 (0+1) (0+1) (0+1) (0+1) (0+1) (0+0) (0+2) (0+3)	Germany; Simon Schempp; Andreas Birnbacher; Michael Greis; Arnd Peiffer	1:18:19.8 (0+0) (0+1) (0+1) (0+3) (0+2) (0+0) (0+1) (0+2)

== Standings ==
#	Name	HOC	OBE	ANT	WCH	Total
1	France	48	36	60	54	198
2	Norway	60	40	30	60	190
3	Russia	54	54	43	38	189
4	Germany	38	43	54	48	183
5	Austria	40	38	48	40	166
6	Italy	29	60	29	43	161
7	Sweden	43	48	40	25	156
8	Belarus	34	28	38	30	130
9	Ukraine	31	31	34	34	130
10	Czech Republic	36	32	27	32	127
11	United States	32	30	31	31	124
12	Slovenia	30	34	32	27	123
13	Switzerland	28	23	29	36	116
14	Slovakia	25	25	26	29	105
15	Bulgaria	27	29	22	24	102
16	Estonia	23	24	23	23	93
17	Japan	22	27	24	18	91
18	Canada	26	—	36	28	90
19	Latvia	18	26	21	22	87
20	Poland	21	22	25	19	87
21	Lithuania	19	21	20	20	80
22	Great Britain	16	20	19	13	68
23	Finland	20	19	—	21	60
24	Kazakhstan	24	—	—	26	50
25	Serbia	—	—	18	16	34
26	China	17	—	—	17	34
27	Romania	—	—	17	—	17
28	Belgium	—	—	—	15	15
29	South Korea	—	—	—	14	14
30	Croatia	—	—	—	12	12
