= 2011–12 Biathlon World Cup – Sprint Women =

The 2011–12 Biathlon World Cup – Sprint Women will start on Saturday December 3, 2011 in Östersund and will finish Friday March 16, 2012 in Khanty-Mansiysk. Defending titlist is Magdalena Neuner of Germany.

== Competition format ==
The 7.5 kilometres sprint race is the third oldest biathlon event; the distance is skied over three laps. The biathlete shoots two times at any shooting lane, first prone, then standing, totalling 10 targets. For each missed target the biathlete has to complete a penalty lap of around 150 metres. Competitors' starts are staggered, normally by 30 seconds.

== 2010-11 Top 3 Standings ==
Medal	Athlete	Points
Gold:	(Germany) Magdalena Neuner	404
Silver:	(Finland) Kaisa Mäkäräinen	391
Bronze:	(Norway) Tora Berger	356

== Medal winners ==
Event:	Gold:	Time	Silver:	Time	Bronze:	Time
Östersund details	Magdalena Neuner; Germany	22:01.7 (0+1)	Tora Berger; Norway	22:01.9 (0+1)	Kaisa Mäkäräinen; Finland	22:16.9 (2+0)
Hochfilzen details	Magdalena Neuner; Germany	21:09.2 (0+0)	Kaisa Mäkäräinen; Finland	21:24.1 (1+0)	Olga Zaitseva; Russia	21:31.9 (1+0)
Hochfilzen (2) details	Olga Zaitseva; Russia	20:36.6 (0+1)	Darya Domracheva; Belarus	20:50.5 (1+1)	Helena Ekholm; Sweden	21:06.8 (1+0)
Oberhof details	Magdalena Neuner; Germany	22:27.6 (0+0)	Darya Domracheva; Belarus	23:04.9 (0+1)	Olga Zaitseva; Russia	23:11.0 (0+0)
Nové Město details	Olga Zaitseva; Russia	23:08.1 (0+0)	Tora Berger; Norway	23:33.6 (1+1)	Magdalena Neuner; Germany	23:42.6 (0+3)
Antholz details	Magdalena Neuner; Germany	20:27.7 (0+1)	Kaisa Mäkäräinen; Finland	20:45.2 (0+0)	Darya Domracheva; Belarus	20:58.2 (2+0)
Holmenkollen details	Magdalena Neuner; Germany	20:41.9 (0+0)	Darya Domracheva; Belarus	21:20.1 (0+1)	Tora Berger; Norway	21:30.8 (1+0)
Kontiolahti details	Magdalena Neuner; Germany	23:07.4 (1+0)	Kaisa Mäkäräinen; Finland	23:19.7 (1+0)	Darya Domracheva; Belarus	23:24.4 (2+0)
Biathlon World Championships 2012 details	Magdalena Neuner; Germany	21:07.0 (0+0)	Darya Domracheva; Belarus	21:22.2 (0+0)	Vita Semerenko; Ukraine	21:44.6 (0+0)
Khanty-Mansiysk details	Magdalena Neuner; Germany	22:11.5 (1+1)	Vita Semerenko; Ukraine	22:14.7 (0+0)	Darya Domracheva; Belarus	22:27.7 (0+1)

== Standings ==
#	Name	ÖST	HOC1	HOC2	OBE	NOV	ANT	HOL	KON	WCH	KHA	Total
1	Magdalena Neuner (GER)	60	60	43	60	48	60	60	60	60	60	571
2	Darya Domracheva (BLR)	40	40	54	54	31	48	54	48	54	48	471
3	Kaisa Mäkäräinen (FIN)	48	54	32	43	27	54	32	54	14	43	401
4	Tora Berger (NOR)	54	25	17	27	54	43	48	31	38	36	373
5	Olga Zaitseva (RUS)	12	48	60	48	60	0	38	43	25	—	334
6	Helena Ekholm (SWE)	16	43	48	10	32	40	17	28	43	40	317
7	Olga Vilukhina (RUS)	11	36	30	31	40	38	22	32	34	—	274
8	Anastasiya Kuzmina (SVK)	22	38	18	30	3	34	36	40	31	22	274
9	Andrea Henkel (GER)	34	34	27	40	26	—	40	25	7	38	271
10	Marie Laure Brunet (FRA)	40	24	13	24	43	6	31	13	40	30	264
11	Synnøve Solemdal (NOR)	43	32	24	23	15	36	34	14	9	29	259
12	Vita Semerenko (UKR)	25	1	40	29	21	25	—	11	48	54	254
13	Marie Dorin Habert (FRA)	31	29	38	0	12	10	43	18	32	21	234
14	Tina Bachmann (GER)	14	27	4	9	0	32	25	34	19	19	183
15	Anna Bogaliy-Titovets (RUS)	29	28	19	19	24	14	—	36	0	6	175
16	Teja Gregorin (SLO)	0	20	0	38	29	30	3	24	30	0	174
17	Svetlana Sleptsova (RUS)	32	5	14	28	17	31	0	—	36	10	173
18	Krystyna Pałka (POL)	27	30	23	11	25	1	0	9	20	27	173
19	Zina Kocher (CAN)	26	9	0	—	18	0	16	29	23	32	153
20	Miriam Gössner (GER)	19	0	0	4	4	26	26	38	4	25	146
21	Weronika Nowakowska-Ziemniak (POL)	7	3	34	13	36	23	—	5	21	0	141
22	Jana Gereková (SVK)	0	8	0	0	23	15	29	27	0	34	136
23	Natalya Burdyga (UKR)	4	0	0	34	30	22	13	15	0	16	134
24	Veronika Vítková (CZE)	—	18	0	14	28	7	30	—	16	20	133
25	Valj Semerenko (UKR)	36	19	0	17	0	28	—	0	0	29	129
26	Selina Gasparin (SUI)	15	26	0	—	—	2	27	10	29	19	128
27	Michela Ponza (ITA)	2	23	29	26	0	13	0	7	18	9	127
28	Nastassia Dubarezava (BLR)	0	0	31	36	34	0	7	1	6	11	126
29	Franziska Hildebrand (GER)	23	—	16	0	0	29	28	0	12	15	123
30	Anais Bescond (FRA)	17	17	0	16	0	8	9	30	22	0	119
31	Elise Ringen (NOR)	21	31	—	12	2	11	0	0	27	14	118
32	Mari Laukkanen (FIN)	0	0	9	—	7	9	21	22	26	12	106
33	Liudmila Kalinchik (BLR)	0	0	28	—	19	21	0	8	13	0	89
34	Karin Oberhofer (ITA)	10	11	22	21	22	0	—	0	—	—	86
35	Susan Dunklee (USA)	13	4	0	6	0	24	6	0	0	31	84
36	Olena Pidhrushna (UKR)	20	0	0	20	16	27	—	0	—	—	83
37	Ekaterina Glazyrina (RUS)	—	—	—	—	38	17	2	—	—	23	80
38	Laure Soulie (AND)	5	14	0	15	10	12	10	6	8	0	80
39	Sophie Boilley (FRA)	28	2	8	0	0	0	23	17	1	0	79
40	Nadezhda Skardino (BLR)	0	12	0	18	14	20	0	4	10	1	79
41	Diana Rasimovičiūtė (LTU)	18	0	0	32	0	—	—	0	0	26	76
42	Magdalena Gwizdoń (POL)	3	0	26	0	0	0	4	19	24	—	76
43	Andreja Mali (SLO)	0	13	11	2	8	0	11	0	15	13	73
44	Éva Tófalvi (ROU)	24	15	5	0	20	4	0	0	0	0	68
45	Anna Maria Nilsson (SWE)	9	21	0	0	1	0	0	—	28	5	64
46	Agnieszka Cyl (POL)	0	22	12	—	—	16	0	0	11	—	61
47	Ekaterina Yurlova (RUS)	0	10	21	8	—	19	0	—	—	—	58
48	Juliya Dzhyma (UKR)	—	—	—	7	—	—	—	22	2	24	55
49	Fanny Welle-Strand Horn (NOR)	30	0	0	22	—	—	0	0	—	—	52
50	Sara Studebaker (USA)	0	0	0	0	0	0	18	26	0	4	48
51	Anna Karin Strömstedt (SWE)	0	0	25	0	9	0	14	0	0	0	48
52	Megan Imrie (CAN)	8	0	16	—	0	0	24	—	0	0	48
53	Tang Jialin (CHN)	—	0	38	—	—	—	0	0	0	—	38
54	Katja Haller (ITA)	—	—	—	—	—	18	19	0	0	—	37
55	Marine Bolliet (FRA)	0	6	0	25	0	3	1	0	—	0	35
56	Kadri Lehtla (EST)	—	—	—	—	0	0	12	20	0	—	32
57	Yana Romanova (RUS)	—	0	—	—	—	—	—	23	—	3	26
58	Fuyuko Suzuki (JPN)	0	0	0	6	0	0	0	0	17	—	23
59	Bente Landheim (NOR)	0	0	—	0	0	0	5	16	0	0	21
60	Luminita Piscoran (ROU)	0	0	0	0	6	0	15	0	0	0	21
61	Romana Schrempf (AUT)	0	0	20	0	0	0	—	0	—	—	20
62	Anna Boulygina (RUS)	—	—	—	—	—	—	20	—	—	—	20
63	Tiril Eckhoff (NOR)	—	—	—	—	—	0	0	0	—	17	17
64	Carolin Hennecke (GER)	—	16	—	—	—	—	—	—	—	—	16
65	Paulina Bobak (POL)	—	—	3	—	—	0	0	12	—	—	15
66	Elisabeth Högberg (SWE)	—	0	0	—	13	0	0	0	—	—	13
67	Ekaterina Shumilova (RUS)	—	—	—	0	11	—	—	0	—	0	11
68	Olga Poltoranina (KAZ)	0	0	10	—	0	0	—	—	0	—	10
69	Annalies Cook (USA)	—	—	0	0	0	0	8	2	0	—	10
70	Marina Korovina (RUS)	—	—	—	—	—	—	—	—	—	8	8
71	Ane Skrove Nossum (NOR)	—	—	7	0	0	—	—	—	—	0	7
72	Laure Bosc (FRA)	0	7	0	—	—	—	—	—	—	—	7
73	Maren Hammerschmidt (GER)	—	—	—	—	—	—	—	—	—	7	7
74	Nadine Horchler (GER)	—	—	2	—	—	5	—	—	—	—	7
75	Darya Usanova (KAZ)	6	0	0	—	—	0	—	—	0	—	6
76	Birgitte Roeksund (NOR)	—	—	6	—	—	0	—	—	—	—	6
77	Dorothea Wierer (ITA)	0	0	0	0	5	0	0	0	0	—	5
78	Amanda Lightfoot (GBR)	—	—	—	0	0	0	—	—	5	—	5
79	Jenny Jonsson (SWE)	0	0	—	1	0	0	0	4	0	—	5
80	Elena Khrustaleva (KAZ)	—	—	—	—	—	—	—	—	4	—	4
81	Pauline Macabies (FRA)	—	—	—	3	—	—	—	—	—	—	3
82	Aleksandra Alikina (RUS)	—	—	—	—	—	—	—	—	—	2	2
83	Ekaterina Vinogradova (ARM)	0	0	1	0	0	0	—	—	—	—	1
84	Reka Ferencz (ROU)	1	0	0	0	0	0	—	—	0	—	1
