= 2011–12 Biathlon World Cup – Overall Women =

== 2010–11 Top 3 Standings ==
Medal	Athlete	Points
Gold:	(Finland) Kaisa Mäkäräinen	1005
Silver:	(Germany) Andrea Henkel	972
Bronze:	(Sweden) Helena Ekholm	971

== Events summary ==
Event:	Winner:	Second:	Third:
Östersund 15 km Individual details	Darya Domracheva; Belarus	Anna Maria Nilsson; Sweden	Magdalena Neuner; Germany
Östersund 7.5 km Sprint details	Magdalena Neuner; Germany	Tora Berger; Norway	Kaisa Mäkäräinen; Finland
Östersund 10 km Pursuit details	Tora Berger; Norway	Kaisa Mäkäräinen; Finland	Magdalena Neuner; Germany
Hochfilzen 7.5 km Sprint details	Magdalena Neuner; Germany	Kaisa Mäkäräinen; Finland	Olga Zaitseva; Russia
Hochfilzen 10 km Pursuit details	Darya Domracheva; Belarus	Olga Zaitseva; Russia	Magdalena Neuner; Germany
Hochfilzen (2) 7.5 km Sprint details	Olga Zaitseva; Russia	Darya Domracheva; Belarus	Helena Ekholm; Sweden
Hochfilzen (2) 10 km Pursuit details	Olga Zaitseva; Russia	Helena Ekholm; Sweden	Darya Domracheva; Belarus
Oberhof 7.5 km Sprint details	Magdalena Neuner; Germany	Darya Domracheva; Belarus	Olga Zaitseva; Russia
Oberhof 12.5 km Mass start details	Magdalena Neuner; Germany	Tora Berger; Norway	Andrea Henkel; Germany
Nové Město 15 km Individual details	Kaisa Mäkäräinen; Finland	Helena Ekholm; Sweden	Magdalena Neuner; Germany
Nové Město 7.5 km Sprint details	Olga Zaitseva; Russia	Tora Berger; Norway	Magdalena Neuner; Germany
Nové Město 10 km Pursuit details	Tora Berger; Norway	Helena Ekholm; Sweden	Marie Laure Brunet; France
Antholz 7.5 km Sprint details	Magdalena Neuner; Germany	Kaisa Mäkäräinen; Finland	Darya Domracheva; Belarus
Antholz 12.5 km Mass start details	Darya Domracheva; Belarus	Anastasiya Kuzmina; Slovakia	Magdalena Neuner; Germany
Holmenkollen 7.5 km Sprint details	Magdalena Neuner; Germany	Darya Domracheva; Belarus	Tora Berger; Norway
Holmenkollen 10 km Pursuit details	Magdalena Neuner; Germany	Olga Zaitseva; Russia	Darya Domracheva; Belarus
Holmenkollen 12.5 km Mass start details	Andrea Henkel; Germany	Darya Domracheva; Belarus	Teja Gregorin; Slovenia
Kontiolahti 7.5 km Sprint details	Magdalena Neuner; Germany	Kaisa Mäkäräinen; Finland	Darya Domracheva; Belarus
Kontiolahti 10 km Pursuit details	Kaisa Mäkäräinen; Finland	Magdalena Neuner; Germany	Darya Domracheva; Belarus
World Championships 7.5 km Sprint details	Magdalena Neuner; Germany	Darya Domracheva; Belarus	Vita Semerenko; Ukraine
World Championships 10 km Pursuit details	Darya Domracheva; Belarus	Magdalena Neuner; Germany	Olga Vilukhina; Russia
World Championships 15 km Individual details	Tora Berger; Norway	Marie Laure Brunet; France	Helena Ekholm; Sweden
World Championships 12.5 km Mass start details	Tora Berger; Norway	Marie Laure Brunet; France	Kaisa Mäkäräinen; Finland
Khanty-Mansiysk 7.5 km Sprint details	Magdalena Neuner; Germany	Vita Semerenko; Ukraine	Darya Domracheva; Belarus
Khanty-Mansiysk 10 km Pursuit details	Darya Domracheva; Belarus	Kaisa Mäkäräinen; Finland	Vita Semerenko; Ukraine
Khanty-Mansiysk 12.5 km Mass start [ details]	Darya Domracheva; Belarus	Tora Berger; Norway	Kaisa Mäkäräinen; Finland

== Standings ==
#	Name	ÖST IN	ÖST SP	ÖST PU	HOC SP	HOC PU	HOC SP	HOC PU	OBE SP	OBE MS	NME IN	NME SP	NME PU	ANT SP	ANT MS	HOL SP	HOL PU	HOL MS	KON SP	KON PU	WCH SP	WCH PU	WCH IN	WCH MS	KHM SP	KHM PU	KHM MS	Total
1.	Magdalena Neuner (GER)	48	60	48	60	48	43	29	60	60	48	48	36	60	48	60	60	—	60	54	60	54	~~18~~	31	60	43	38	1216
2	Darya Domracheva (BLR)	60	40	~~25~~	40	60	54	48	54	36	40	31	43	48	60	54	48	54	48	48	54	60	~~16~~	40	48	60	60	1188
3	Tora Berger (NOR)	~~12~~	54	60	25	32	~~17~~	43	27	54	36	54	60	43	43	48	43	30	31	40	38	43	60	60	36	40	54	1054
4	Kaisa Mäkäräinen (FIN)	43	48	54	54	30	32	40	43	29	60	27	31	54	30	32	40	32	54	60	~~14~~	21	~~13~~	48	43	54	48	1007
5	Helena Ekholm (SWE)	36	~~16~~	34	43	29	48	54	~~10~~	40	54	32	54	40	34	17	25	43	28	29	43	40	48	26	40	30	26	893
6	Olga Zaitseva (RUS)	27	12	26	48	54	60	60	48	43	43	60	40	dsq	36	38	54	23	43	43	25	36	38	dsq	—	—	—	857
7	Marie Laure Brunet (FRA)	26	40	36	24	34	13	27	24	38	0	43	48	~~6~~	26	31	36	40	13	14	40	38	54	54	30	38	40	807
8	Andrea Henkel (GER)	24	34	31	34	43	27	38	40	48	25	26	34	—	28	40	30	60	25	34	~~7~~	30	21	29	38	36	31	806
9	Marie Dorin Habert (FRA)	30	31	23	29	36	38	34	0	34	34	12	27	~~10~~	32	43	34	34	18	26	32	32	43	38	21	34	34	749
10	Anastasiya Kuzmina (SVK)	34	22	32	38	31	18	21	30	20	20	~~3~~	~~13~~	34	54	36	20	29	40	31	31	22	31	34	22	28	43	721
11	Olga Vilukhina (RUS)	17	11	4	36	38	30	32	31	23	19	40	23	38	21	22	38	38	32	36	34	48	34	22	—	—	—	667
12	Vita Semerenko (UKR)	8	25	28	1	—	40	31	29	32	14	21	24	25	38	—	—	—	11	20	48	34	25	36	54	48	30	622
13	Synnøve Solemdal (NOR)	28	43	24	32	16	24	26	23	21	32	15	21	36	25	34	24	36	14	27	~~9~~	17	~~2~~	23	29	22	14	606
14	Tina Bachmann (GER)	19	14	38	27	27	4	—	9	24	10	0	12	32	18	25	31	28	34	38	19	27	0	43	19	27	21	546
15	Teja Gregorin (SLO)	29	0	16	20	19	0	0	38	27	27	29	28	30	31	3	11	48	24	28	30	29	30	28	0	—	—	525
16	Svetlana Sleptsova (RUS)	0	32	40	5	23	14	16	28	25	29	17	29	31	40	0	—	14	—	—	36	25	36	17	10	24	20	511
17	Krystyna Pałka (POL)	21	27	27	30	24	23	28	11	14	0	25	32	1	27	0	10	31	9	18	20	14	0	16	27	31	29	495
18	Anna Bogaliy-Titovets (RUS)	1	29	30	28	40	19	36	19	30	9	24	8	14	15	—	—	—	36	24	0	18	—	—	6	14	28	428
19	Zina Kocher (CAN)	6	26	17	9	18	0	11	—	—	26	18	11	0	—	16	12	12	29	32	23	15	15	18	32	29	32	407
20	Michela Ponza (ITA)	11	2	15	23	20	29	22	26	26	0	0	14	13	19	0	7	24	7	12	18	1	32	13	9	25	17	385
21	Natalya Burdyga (UKR)	5	4	13	0	8	0	5	34	16	23	30	38	22	17	13	15	20	15	19	0	—	29	—	16	18	18	378
22	Valj Semerenko (UKR)	32	36	43	19	17	0	—	28	17	0	0	22	28	22	—	—	—	0	17	0	0	0	—	29	23	23	356
23	Franziska Hildebrand (GER)	38	23	14	—	—	16	18	0	15	31	0	—	29	16	28	29	26	0	0	12	0	—	—	15	19	27	356
24	Weronika Nowakowska-Ziemniak (POL)	0	7	1	3	10	34	20	13	—	11	36	26	23	24	—	—	—	5	9	21	24	20	32	0	6	15	340
25	Veronika Vítková (CZE)	—	—	—	18	22	0	0	14	—	0	28	20	7	—	30	32	27	—	—	16	23	26	27	20	2	24	336
26	Elise Ringen (NOR)	9	21	29	31	26	—	—	12	13	13	2	10	11	13	0	13	19	0	0	27	20	0	19	14	0	25	327
27	Miriam Gössner (GER)	0	19	3	0	3	0	13	4	—	0	4	30	26	11	26	22	21	38	21	4	19	5	—	25	16	12	322
28	Jana Gerekova (SVK)	10	0	0	8	6	0	—	0	—	0	23	15	15	—	29	1	—	27	22	0	10	28	30	34	26	22	306
29	Selina Gasparin (SUI)	0	15	0	26	11	0	23	—	—	—	—	—	2	—	27	19	17	10	3	29	28	0	15	19	9	—	253
30	Anais Bescond (FRA)	0	17	12	17	1	0	0	16	—	22	0	2	8	—	9	23	—	30	25	22	13	0	24	0	10	—	251
#	Name	ÖST IN	ÖST SP	ÖST PU	HOC SP	HOC PU	HOC SP	HOC PU	OBE SP	OBE MS	NME IN	NME SP	NME PU	ANT SP	ANT MS	HOL SP	HOL PU	HOL MS	KON SP	KON PU	WCH SP	WCH PU	WCH IN	WCH MS	KHM SP	KHM PU	KHM MS	Total
31	Anna Maria Nilsson (SWE)	54	9	0	21	12	0	14	0	22	24	1	0	0	—	0	0	—	—	—	28	31	0	21	5	0	—	242
32	Olena Pidhrushna (UKR)	40	20	18	0	—	0	—	20	19	15	16	9	27	29	—	—	—	0	0	—	—	27	—	—	—	—	240
33	Nastassia Dubarezava (BLR)	0	0	8	0	0	31	8	36	31	16	34	5	0	—	7	0	15	1	7	6	8	12	—	11	0	—	236
34	Susan Dunklee (USA)	0	13	9	4	0	0	—	6	—	0	0	—	24	14	6	6	—	0	—	0	5	40	25	31	32	13	228
35	Sophie Boilley (FRA)	4	28	19	2	5	8	25	0	—	2	0	6	0	—	23	18	22	17	16	1	0	14	—	0	—	—	210
36	Mari Laukkanen (FIN)	0	0	7	0	0	9	9	—	—	0	7	0	9	—	21	27	16	22	0	26	16	0	14	12	0	—	195
37	Ekaterina Yurlova (RUS)	31	0	—	10	21	21	19	8	18	0	—	—	19	23	0	—	18	—	—	—	—	—	—	—	—	—	188
38	Ekaterina Glazyrina (RUS)	—	—	—	—	—	—	—	—	—	38	38	25	17	—	2	9	—	—	—	—	—	—	—	23	13	19	184
39	Éva Tófalvi (ROU)	0	24	21	15	28	5	0	0	—	30	20	18	4	—	0	—	13	0	—	0	—	0	—	0	—	—	178
40	Nadezhda Skardino (BLR)	0	0	0	12	0	0	0	18	—	28	14	0	20	20	0	4	—	4	2	10	12	7	—	1	7	—	159
41	Magdalena Gwizdon (POL)	0	3	0	0	—	26	7	0	—	0	0	—	0	—	4	14	—	19	1	24	26	17	12	—	—	—	153
42	Liudmila Kalinchik (BLR)	—	0	—	0	0	28	10	—	—	—	19	19	21	—	0	5	—	8	10	13	11	—	—	0	1	—	145
43	Andreja Mali (SLO)	0	0	5	13	0	11	4	2	—	3	8	0	0	—	11	8	—	0	6	15	7	0	—	13	20	11	137
44	Agnieszka Cyl (POL)	22	0	22	22	25	12	—	—	—	—	—	—	16	—	0	2	—	0	—	11	3	—	—	—	—	—	135
45	Karin Oberhofer (ITA)	0	10	0	11	4	22	24	21	—	7	22	3	0	—	—	—	—	0	0	—	—	—	—	—	—	—	124
46	Diana Rasimovičiūtė (LTU)	—	18	6	0	—	0	—	32	12	0	0	0	0	—	—	—	—	0	4	0	0	0	—	26	5	16	119
47	Fanny Welle-Strand Horn (NOR)	23	30	20	0	—	0	—	22	11	4	—	—	—	—	0	0	—	0	—	—	—	8	—	—	—	—	118
48	Kadri Lehtla (EST)	—	—	—	—	—	—	—	—	—	17	0	—	0	—	12	21	—	20	23	0	0	19	—	—	—	—	112
49	Laure Soulie (AND)	7	5	—	14	9	0	0	15	—	5	10	0	12	—	10	0	—	6	0	8	4	0	—	0	—	—	105
50	Iana Romanova (RUS)	0	—	—	0	7	—	—	—	—	—	—	—	—	—	—	—	—	23	30	—	—	24	—	3	12	—	99
51	Megan Imrie (CAN)	0	8	0	0	—	16	17	—	—	21	0	0	0	—	24	0	—	—	—	0	2	0	—	0	0	—	88
52	Anna Karin Strömstedt (SWE)	—	0	0	0	—	25	12	0	—	0	9	0	0	—	14	26	—	0	—	0	0	0	—	0	0	—	86
53	Katja Haller (ITA)	16	0	—	0	—	0	—	—	—	0	0	0	18	12	19	17	—	0	0	0	0	0	—	—	—	—	82
54	Tiril Eckhoff (NOR)	—	—	—	—	—	—	—	—	—	—	—	—	—	—	—	—	—	—	—	—	—	—	—	17	21	36	74
55	Sara Studebaker (USA)	0	0	2	0	0	0	—	0	—	0	0	0	0	—	18	16	—	26	5	0	0	3	—	4	0	—	74
56	Fuyuko Suzuki (JPN)	2	0	—	0	—	0	0	6	—	0	0	0	0	—	0	0	—	0	0	17	6	23	20	—	—	—	74
57	Anna Boulygina (RUS)	—	—	—	—	—	—	—	—	—	—	—	—	—	—	20	28	25	—	—	—	—	—	—	—	—	—	73
58	Bente Landheim (NOR)	0	0	0	0	14	—	—	0	—	0	0	16	0	—	5	0	—	16	13	0	9	—	—	0	0	—	73
59	Jialin Tang (CHN)	—	—	—	0	—	38	30	—	—	—	—	—	—	—	0	—	—	0	—	0	—	0	—	—	—	—	68
60	Juliya Dzhyma (UKR)	—	—	—	—	—	—	—	7	—	—	—	—	—	—	—	—	—	22	8	2	0	—	—	24	3	—	66
#	Name	ÖST IN	ÖST SP	ÖST PU	HOC SP	HOC PU	HOC SP	HOC PU	OBE SP	OBE MS	NME IN	NME SP	NME PU	ANT SP	ANT MS	HOL SP	HOL PU	HOL MS	KON SP	KON PU	WCH SP	WCH PU	WCH IN	WCH MS	KHM SP	KHM PU	KHM MS	Total
61	Jenny Jonsson (SWE)	25	0	0	0	—	—	—	1	—	18	0	—	0	—	0	—	—	4	11	0	0	0	—	—	—	—	59
62	Marine Bolliet (FRA)	0	0	—	6	2	0	2	25	17	0	—	—	3	—	1	0	—	0	—	—	—	—	—	0	0	—	56
63	Ekaterina Shumilova (RUS)	—	—	—	—	—	—	—	0	—	—	11	17	—	—	—	—	—	0	0	—	—	—	—	0	11	—	39
64	Romana Schrempf (AUT)	15	0	—	0	—	20	0	0	—	0	0	—	0	—	—	—	—	0	—	—	—	1	—	—	—	—	36
65	Olga Poltoranina (KAZ)	0	0	—	0	0	10	15	—	—	8	0	1	0	—	—	—	—	—	—	0	—	0	—	—	—	—	34
66	Carolin Hennecke (GER)	—	—	—	16	15	—	—	—	—	—	—	—	—	—	—	—	—	—	—	—	—	—	—	—	—	—	31
67	Sabrina Buchholz (GER)	18	0	—	—	—	—	—	0	—	12	0	—	—	—	0	0	—	0	—	—	—	—	—	—	—	—	30
68	Elena Khrustaleva (KAZ)	—	—	—	—	—	—	—	—	—	—	—	—	—	—	—	—	—	—	—	4	—	22	—	—	—	—	26
69	Marina Korovina (RUS)	—	—	—	—	—	—	—	—	—	—	—	—	—	—	—	—	—	—	—	—	—	—	—	8	17	—	25
70	Anastasia Zagoruiko (RUS)	—	—	—	—	—	—	—	—	—	—	—	—	—	—	—	—	—	0	15	—	—	—	—	0	8	—	23
71	Monika Hojnisz (POL)	—	0	10	0	13	—	—	0	—	0	0	—	—	—	—	—	—	—	—	—	—	—	—	—	—	—	23
72	Maren Hammerschmidt (GER)	—	—	—	—	—	—	—	—	—	—	—	—	—	—	—	—	—	—	—	—	—	—	—	7	15	—	22
73	Luminita Piscoran (ROU)	0	0	—	0	—	0	—	0	—	0	6	0	0	—	15	0	—	0	0	0	—	0	—	0	0	—	21
74	Emelie Larsson (SWE)	20	0	—	0	—	0	—	—	—	—	—	—	—	—	—	—	—	—	—	—	—	—	—	—	—	—	20
75	Laure Bosc (FRA)	13	0	0	7	0	0	—	—	—	—	—	—	—	—	—	—	—	—	—	—	—	—	—	—	—	—	20
76	Elisabeth Högberg (SWE)	0	—	—	0	—	0	—	—	—	0	13	7	0	—	0	—	—	0	—	—	—	0	—	—	—	—	20
77	Paulina Bobak (POL)	0	—	—	—	—	3	0	—	—	—	—	—	0	—	0	0	—	12	0	—	—	0	—	—	—	—	15
78	Jori Mørkve (NOR)	14	0	—	0	0	0	—	—	—	—	—	—	—	—	—	—	—	—	—	—	—	—	—	—	—	—	14
79	Natalia Sorokina (RUS)	—	0	11	—	—	0	3	—	—	—	—	—	—	—	—	—	—	—	—	—	—	—	—	—	—	—	14
80	Nadine Horchler (GER)	—	—	—	—	—	2	6	—	—	—	—	—	5	—	—	—	—	—	—	—	—	—	—	—	—	—	13
81	Megan Heinicke (CAN)	—	—	—	—	—	—	—	—	0	—	—	—	—	—	—	—	—	—	—	0	0	11	—	—	—	—	11
82	Reka Ferencz (ROU)	0	1	0	0	—	0	—	0	—	0	0	—	0	—	—	—	—	—	—	0	0	10	—	—	—	—	11
83	Annalies Cook (USA)	—	—	—	—	—	0	0	0	—	0	0	0	0	—	8	0	—	2	0	0	—	0	—	—	—	—	10
84	Iris Waldhuber (AUT)	0	0	0	0	—	0	—	—	—	—	—	—	0	—	—	—	—	—	—	0	—	9	—	0	0	—	9
85	Ane Skrove Nossum (NOR)	—	—	—	—	—	7	0	0	—	0	0	—	—	—	—	—	—	—	—	—	—	—	—	0	0	—	7
86	Ekaterina Vinogradova (ARM)	0	0	—	0	0	1	0	0	—	6	0	—	0	—	—	—	—	—	—	—	—	—	—	—	—	—	7
87	Darya Usanova (KAZ)	0	6	0	0	—	0	0	—	—	—	—	—	0	—	—	—	—	—	—	0	—	0	—	—	—	—	6
88	Birgitte Roeksund (NOR)	—	—	—	—	—	6	0	—	—	—	—	—	0	—	—	—	—	—	—	—	—	—	—	—	—	—	6
89	Eveli Saue (EST)	—	—	—	—	—	—	—	—	—	—	—	—	—	—	0	—	—	—	—	—	—	6	—	—	—	—	6
90	Aleksandra Alkina (RUS)	—	—	—	—	—	—	—	—	—	—	—	—	—	—	—	—	—	—	—	—	—	—	—	2	4	—	6
#	Name	ÖST IN	ÖST SP	ÖST PU	HOC SP	HOC PU	HOC SP	HOC PU	OBE SP	OBE MS	NME IN	NME SP	NME PU	ANT SP	ANT MS	HOL SP	HOL PU	HOL MS	KON SP	KON PU	WCH SP	WCH PU	WCH IN	WCH MS	KHM SP	KHM PU	KHM MS	Total
91	Dorothea Wierer (ITA)	0	0	—	0	0	0	0	0	—	0	5	0	0	—	0	0	—	0	—	0	—	0	—	—	—	—	5
92	Amanda Lightfoot (GBR)	—	—	—	—	—	—	—	0	—	0	0	—	0	—	—	—	—	—	—	5	0	0	—	—	—	—	5
93	Gabriela Soukalová (CZE)	—	—	—	—	—	—	—	—	—	0	0	4	0	—	—	—	—	—	—	—	—	—	—	—	—	—	4
94	Lanny Barnes (USA)	0	0	—	—	—	—	—	—	—	—	—	—	—	—	—	—	—	—	—	0	—	4	—	—	—	—	4
95	Kristel Viigipuu (EST)	3	0	—	0	—	0	—	0	—	1	0	—	—	—	—	—	—	0	0	0	—	0	—	—	—	—	4
96	Emilia Yordanova (BUL)	0	0	—	0	—	0	—	0	—	0	0	0	0	—	0	3	—	0	—	0	0	0	—	0	—	—	3
97	Pauline Macabies (FRA)	—	—	—	—	—	—	—	3	—	—	—	—	—	—	—	—	—	—	—	—	—	—	—	—	—	—	3
98	Iryna Kryuko (BLR)	—	—	—	—	—	0	1	0	—	—	0	0	0	—	0	0	—	0	—	—	—	0	—	0	0	—	1
