= Biathlon World Championships 2012 – Men's sprint =

Men's sprint at the Biathlon World Championships 2012
- Date: 3 March 2012
- Competitors: 138 from 41 nations
- Winning time: 24:18.6

Medalists
gold medal	Martin Fourcade	France
silver medal	Emil Hegle Svendsen	Norway
bronze medal	Carl Johan Bergman	Sweden

The men's sprint competition of the Biathlon World Championships 2012 was held on March 3, 2012 at 12:30 local time.

== Results ==
Rank	Bib	Name	Country	Penalties (P+S)	Time	Deficit
1st place, gold medalist(s)	9	Martin Fourcade	France	2 (1+1)	24:18.6	—
2nd place, silver medalist(s)	1	Emil Hegle Svendsen	Norway	2 (1+1)	24:33.7	+15.1
3rd place, bronze medalist(s)	41	Carl Johan Bergman	Sweden	0 (0+0)	24:36.3	+17.7
4	18	Daniel Mesotitsch	Austria	0 (0+0)	24:45.7	+27.1
5	5	Simon Fourcade	France	2 (2+0)	24:54.0	+35.4
6	14	Fredrik Lindström	Sweden	1 (0+1)	24:54.2	+35.6
7	24	Björn Ferry	Sweden	0 (0+0)	25:00.5	+41.9
8	8	Markus Windisch	Italy	0 (0+0)	25:04.5	+45.9
9	33	Alexis Bœuf	France	2 (1+1)	25:17.2	+58.6
10	12	Tim Burke	United States	1 (0+1)	25:17.4	+58.8
11	4	Jakov Fak	Slovenia	1 (1+0)	25:19.3	+1:00.7
12	34	Evgeniy Garanichev	Russia	0 (0+0)	25:22.5	+1:03.9
13	30	Anton Shipulin	Russia	1 (0+1)	25:23.7	+1:05.1
14	21	Jean-Philippe Leguellec	Canada	1 (0+1)	25:28.6	+1:10.0
15	57	Dušan Šimočko	Slovakia	0 (0+0)	25:31.1	+1:12.5
16	11	Andreas Birnbacher	Germany	2 (0+2)	25:31.4	+1:12.8
17	26	Tarjei Bø	Norway	3 (0+3)	25:31.6	+1:13.0
18	42	Ondřej Moravec	Czech Republic	2 (2+0)	25:31.9	+1:13.3
19	20	Simon Schempp	Germany	2 (0+2)	25:32.1	+1:13.5
20	27	Lowell Bailey	United States	0 (0+0)	25:33.8	+1:15.2
21	28	Ole Einar Bjørndalen	Norway	3 (1+2)	25:34.9	+1:16.3
22	43	Serhiy Semenov	Ukraine	1 (0+1)	25:35.8	+1:17.2
23	58	Sergey Novikov	Belarus	0 (0+0)	25:38.1	+1:19.5
24	17	Simon Hallenbarter	Switzerland	1 (1+0)	25:39.6	+1:21.0
25	10	Michal Šlesingr	Czech Republic	2 (1+1)	25:46.6	+1:28.0
26	32	Michael Greis	Germany	3 (2+1)	25:47.4	+1:28.8
27	45	Yan Savitskiy	Kazakhstan	0 (0+0)	25:48.8	+1:30.2
28	29	Dominik Landertinger	Austria	2 (1+1)	25:49.9	+1:31.3
29	62	Matej Kazár	Slovakia	2 (1+1)	25:50.2	+1:31.6
30	2	Evgeny Ustyugov	Russia	2 (0+2)	25:52.0	+1:33.4
31	15	Lukas Hofer	Italy	3 (1+2)	25:52.3	+1:33.7
32	37	Lars Berger	Norway	4 (1+3)	26:00.8	+1:42.2
33	6	Andrei Makoveev	Russia	3 (1+2)	26:01.2	+1:42.6
34	40	Florian Graf	Germany	2 (1+1)	26:02.2	+1:43.6
35	19	Artem Pryma	Ukraine	1 (0+1)	26:02.3	+1:43.7
36	7	Benjamin Weger	Switzerland	2 (0+2)	26:02.6	+1:44.0
37	13	Arnd Peiffer	Germany	3 (1+2)	26:03.6	+1:45.0
38	52	Junji Nagai	Japan	1 (0+1)	26:05.1	+1:46.5
39	50	Janez Marič	Slovenia	2 (1+1)	26:07.9	+1:49.3
40	56	Ivan Joller	Switzerland	0 (0+0)	26:11.1	+1:52.5
41	16	Christoph Sumann	Austria	0 (0+0)	26:11.3	+1:52.7
42	63	Andriy Deryzemlya	Ukraine	2 (1+1)	26:15.5	+1:56.9
43	25	Jaroslav Soukup	Czech Republic	2 (0+2)	26:15.7	+1:57.1
44	36	Klemen Bauer	Slovenia	4 (0+4)	26:16.6	+1:58.0
45	88	Nathan Smith	Canada	2 (1+1)	26:21.9	+2:03.3
46	35	Simon Eder	Austria	2 (0+2)	26:25.1	+2:06.5
47	47	Christian Stebler	Switzerland	3 (1+2)	26:27.6	+2:09.0
48	38	Jean-Guillaume Béatrix	France	3 (1+2)	26:29.5	+2:10.9
49	22	Michail Kletcherov	Bulgaria	2 (2+0)	26:31.2	+2:12.6
50	54	Scott Perras	Canada	2 (0+2)	26:32.2	+2:13.6
51	106	Kazuya Inomata	Japan	1 (0+1)	26:37.2	+2:18.6
52	3	Krasimir Anev	Bulgaria	3 (2+1)	26:38.7	+2:20.1
53	95	Stefan Gavrila	Romania	1 (1+0)	26:38.8	+2:20.2
54	67	Tomasz Sikora	Poland	2 (1+1)	26:39.2	+2:20.6
55	89	Marc-André Bédard	Canada	2 (1+1)	26:43.0	+2:24.4
56	71	Hidenori Isa	Japan	2 (0+2)	26:43.4	+2:24.8
57	66	Vladimir Iliev	Bulgaria	2 (2+0)	26:46.2	+2:27.6
58	55	Roland Lessing	Estonia	3 (1+2)	26:50.4	+2:31.8
59	114	Kauri Koiv	Estonia	1 (1+0)	26:52.2	+2:33.6
60	64	Christian de Lorenzi	Italy	3 (2+1)	26:54.5	+2:35.9
61	79	Miroslav Kenanov	Bulgaria	0 (0+0)	27:00.5	+2:41.9
62	70	Tomas Kaukėnas	Lithuania	1 (0+1)	27:02.7	+2:44.1
63	31	Russell Currier	United States	3 (1+2)	27:07.0	+2:48.4
64	49	Zdeněk Vítek	Czech Republic	3 (1+2)	27:08.4	+2:49.8
65	113	Milanko Petrović	Serbia	2 (1+1)	27:09.5	+2:50.9
66	65	Aliaksandr Babchyn	Belarus	3 (1+2)	27:09.6	+2:51.0
67	46	Magnus Jonsson	Sweden	3 (1+2)	27:14.3	+2:55.7
68	60	Dominik Windisch	Italy	4 (3+1)	27:14.6	+2:56.0
69	59	Indrek Tobreluts	Estonia	4 (3+1)	27:15.6	+2:57.0
69	105	Vladimir Alenishko	Belarus	0 (0+0)	27:15.6	+2:57.0
71	53	Jarkko Kauppinen	Finland	2 (0+2)	27:16.9	+2:58.3
71	61	Vasja Rupnik	Slovenia	3 (3+0)	27:16.9	+2:58.3
73	77	Krzysztof Plywaczyk	Poland	2 (2+0)	27:17.5	+2:58.9
74	69	Miroslav Matiaško	Slovakia	3 (1+2)	27:22.6	+3:04.0
74	76	Danil Steptsenko	Estonia	1 (0+1)	27:22.6	+3:04.0
76	93	Pavol Hurajt	Slovakia	2 (1+1)	27:27.4	+3:08.8
77	92	Alexandr Chervyakov	Kazakhstan	2 (1+1)	27:32.4	+3:13.8
78	75	Rolands Pužulis	Latvia	1 (0+1)	27:42.8	+3:24.2
79	111	Yuryi Liadov	Belarus	3 (2+1)	27:45.5	+3:26.9
80	84	Alexandr Trifonov	Kazakhstan	2 (0+2)	27:47.1	+3:28.5
81	112	Edgars Piksons	Latvia	2 (0+2)	27:47.8	+3:29.2
82	98	Timo Antila	Finland	3 (2+1)	27:48.2	+3:29.6
83	48	Andrejs Rastorgujevs	Latvia	1 (1+0)	27:52.5	+3:33.9
84	23	Serguei Sednev	Ukraine	3 (1+2)	27:53.3	+3:34.7
85	82	Łukasz Szczurek	Poland	1 (0+1)	28:13.2	+3:54.6
86	130	Zhang Chengye	China	2 (1+1)	28:15.0	+3:56.4
87	81	Alexei Almoukov	Australia	2 (2+0)	28:17.1	+3:58.5
88	109	Lee-Steve Jackson	Great Britain	3 (1+2)	28:21.8	+4:03.2
89	132	Artūrs Koļesņikovs	Latvia	0 (0+0)	28:26.4	+4:07.8
90	74	Jun Je-uk	South Korea	3 (2+1)	28:35.5	+4:16.9
91	39	Jay Hakkinen	United States	5 (4+1)	28:37.0	+4:18.4
92	124	Mikito Tachizaki	Japan	3 (2+1)	28:40.8	+4:22.2
93	51	Sergey Naumik	Kazakhstan	4 (2+2)	28:44.9	+4:26.3
94	73	Pedro Quintana Arias	Spain	2 (1+1)	28:52.7	+4:34.1
95	120	Ren Long	China	2 (2+0)	28:57.3	+4:38.7
96	137	Rafal Lepel	Poland	0 (0+0)	29:03.6	+4:45.0
97	44	Ahti Toivanen	Finland	6 (4+2)	29:07.7	+4:49.1
98	127	Manuel Fernandez Musso	Spain	2 (0+2)	29:11.5	+4:52.9
99	129	Oystein Slettemark	Greenland	4 (1+3)	29:15.2	+4:56.6
100	91	Samuel Pulido Serrano	Spain	2 (1+1)	29:21.1	+5:02.5
101	118	Pascal Langer	Belgium	2 (1+1)	29:30.5	+5:11.9
102	107	Chen Haibin	China	1 (0+1)	29:34.3	+5:15.7
103	85	Ahmet Üstüntaş	Turkey	1 (1+0)	29:37.7	+5:19.1
104	131	Kevin Kane	Great Britain	3 (1+2)	29:39.8	+5:21.2
105	138	Marcel Laponder	Great Britain	2 (0+2)	29:40.6	+5:22.0
106	135	Thorsten Langer	Belgium	2 (2+0)	29:41.5	+5:22.9
107	108	Milan Szabo	Hungary	4 (2+2)	29:50.8	+5:32.2
108	100	Lee In-bok	South Korea	5 (3+2)	29:59.5	+5:40.9
109	90	Li Zhonghai	China	4 (3+1)	30:01.7	+5:43.1
110	122	Damir Rastić	Serbia	5 (1+4)	30:02.5	+5:43.9
111	97	Vincent Naveau	Belgium	2 (2+0)	30:08.2	+5:49.6
112	78	Karolis Zlatkauskas	Lithuania	5 (2+3)	30:13.2	+5:54.6
113	103	Victor Pinzaru	Moldova	1 (1+0)	30:15.3	+5:56.7
114	115	Herbert Cool	Netherlands	3 (0+3)	30:16.1	+5:57.5
115	116	Kim Yong-gyu	South Korea	4 (1+3)	30:16.3	+5:57.7
116	126	Aleksandr Lavrinovič	Lithuania	3 (1+2)	30:20.3	+6:01.7
117	96	Karoly Gombos	Hungary	5 (1+4)	30:29.7	+6:11.1
118	101	Anuzar Yunusov	Uzbekistan	2 (1+1)	30:43.2	+6:24.6
119	123	Orhangazi Civil	Turkey	1 (0+1)	30:53.1	+6:33.2
120	86	Stefan Lopatić	Bosnia and Herzegovina	4 (3+1)	30:56.7	+6:34.5
121	139	Karol Dombrovski	Lithuania	4 (1+3)	30:58.1	+6:38.1
122	83	Darko Damjanovski	Macedonia	4 (2+2)	31:01.7	+6:43.1
123	134	Laurentiu Vamanu	Romania	5 (3+2)	31:05.2	+6:46.6
124	102	Edin Hodžić	Serbia	2 (0+2)	31:05.9	+6:47.3
125	117	Nemanja Košarac	Bosnia and Herzegovina	6 (3+3)	31:18.9	+7:00.3
126	128	Kim Jong-min	South Korea	5 (2+3)	31:28.1	+7:09.5
127	121	Dejan Krsmanović	Serbia	4 (1+3)	31:36.6	+7:18.0
128	72	Thierry Langer	Belgium	4 (3+1)	31:54.1	+7:35.5
129	68	Pete Beyer	Great Britain	6 (3+3)	32:26.5	+8:07.9
130	119	Dyllan Harmer	Australia	0 (0+0)	32:42.3	+8:23.7
131	99	Jurica Veverec	Croatia	5 (4+1)	33:09.3	+8:50.7
132	136	Istvan Muskatal	Hungary	5 (2+3)	33:33.1	+9:14.5
133	94	Gjorgji Icoski	Macedonia	4 (2+2)	33:39.3	+9:20.7
134	80	Aqqaluartaa Olsen	Greenland	7 (3+4)	33:49.3	+9:30.7
135	125	Tomislav Crnković	Croatia	5 (1+4)	34:08.1	+9:49.5
136	87	Dino Butković	Croatia	7 (4+3)	35:38.5	+11:19.9
	104	Athanassios Tsakiris	Greece	3 (0+3)	DNF	
	133	Kleanthis Karamichas	Greece	(2+)	DNF	
	110	Ville Simola	Finland		DNS	
