= 2011–12 Biathlon World Cup – Relay Women =

International sporting competition

The 2011–12 Biathlon World Cup – Relay Women will start at Sunday December 11, 2011 in Hochfilzen and will finish Friday March 10, 2012 in Ruhpolding at Biathlon World Championships 2012 event. Defending titlist is German team.

== Competition format ==
The relay teams consist of four biathletes, who each ski 6 kilometres (3.7 mi), each leg skied over three laps, with two shooting rounds; one prone, one standing. For every round of five targets there are eight bullets available, though the last three can only be single-loaded manually one at a time from spare round holders or bullets deposited by the competitor into trays or onto the mat at the firing line. If after eight bullets there are still misses, one 150 m penalty loop must be taken for each missed target remaining. The first-leg participants start all at the same time, and as in cross-country skiing relays, every athlete of a team must touch the team's next-leg participant to perform a valid changeover. On the first shooting stage of the first leg, the participant must shoot in the lane corresponding to their bib number (Bib #10 shoots at lane #10 regardless of position in race.), then for the remainder of the relay, the relay team shoots at the lane in the position they arrived (Arrive at the range in 5th place, you shoot at lane five.).

== 2010–11 Top 3 Standings ==
Medal	Country	Points
Gold:	Germany	206
Silver:	Sweden	190
Bronze:	Russia	177

== Medal winners ==
Event:	Gold:	Time	Silver:	Time	Bronze:	Time
Hochfilzen details	Norway; Fanny Welle-Strand Horn; Elise Ringen; Synnøve Solemdal; Tora Berger	1:07:13.3 (0+2) (0+2) (0+1) (0+3) (0+0) (0+0) (0+0) (0+2)	France; Marie Laure Brunet; Anais Bescond; Sophie Boilley; Marie Dorin Habert	1:07:26.9 (0+0) (0+0) (0+1) (0+2) (0+0) (0+0) (0+0) (0+0)	Russia; Svetlana Sleptsova; Natalia Sorokina; Anna Bogaliy-Titovets; Olga Zaitseva	1:07:42.7 (0+3) (0+0) (0+3) (0+0) (0+0) (0+0) (0+0) (0+0)
Oberhof details	Russia; Anna Bogaliy-Titovets; Svetlana Sleptsova; Olga Zaitseva; Olga Vilukhina	1:19:32.0 (0+2) (0+2) (0+2) (0+0) (0+3) (0+3) (0+0) (0+1)	Norway; Fanny Welle-Strand Horn; Elise Ringen; Synnøve Solemdal; Tora Berger	1:19:37.9 (0+0) (2+3) (0+1) (0+1) (0+2) (0+2) (0+1) (0+1)	France; Marie Dorin Habert; Anais Bescond; Marine Bolliet; Sophie Boilley	1:20:38.4 (0+1) (0+0) (1+3) (1+3) (0+1) (0+2) (0+0) (0+2)
Antholtz details	France; Marie Laure Brunet; Sophie Boilley; Anais Bescond; Marie Dorin Habert	1:17:06.5 (0+0) (0+2) (0+1) (0+3) (0+2) (0+1) (0+0) (0+0)	Belarus; Nadezhda Skardino; Liudmila Kalinchik; Nastassia Dubarezava; Darya Domracheva	1:17:09.0 (0+1) (0+0) (0+0) (0+2) (0+2) (0+3) (0+1) (0+1)	Russia; Ekaterina Glazyrina; Svetlana Sleptsova; Olga Zaitseva; Olga Vilukhina	1:17:27.9 (0+2) (0+1) (0+1) (0+2) (0+1) (1+3) (0+1) (0+0)
World Championships 2012 details	Germany; Tina Bachmann; Magdalena Neuner; Miriam Gössner; Andrea Henkel	1:09:33.0 (0+1) (0+0) (0+3) (1+3) (0+2) (0+1) (0+0) (0+0)	France; Marie-Laure Brunet; Sophie Boilley; Anaïs Bescond; Marie Dorin	1:10:01.5 (0+1) (0+0) (0+1) (0+0) (0+1) (0+2) (0+1) (0+1)	Norway; Fanny Welle-Strand Horn; Elise Ringen; Synnøve Solemdal; Tora Berger	1:10:12.5 (0+1) (0+3) (0+1) (0+2) (0+1) (0+3) (0+1) (0+0)

== Standings ==
#	Name	HOC	OBE	ANT	WCH	Total
1	France	54	48	60	54	216
2	Norway	60	54	43	48	205
3	Russia	48	60	48	36	192
4	Germany	38	43	38	60	179
5	Belarus	40	40	54	43	177
6	Ukraine	34	34	40	38	146
7	Poland	43	32	34	32	141
8	Sweden	30	36	31	40	137
9	Italy	36	31	36	29	132
10	Slovakia	29	38	27	34	128
11	Czech Republic	31	30	30	31	122
12	Bulgaria	28	28	29	24	109
13	Canada	32	—	32	28	92
14	United States	27	—	28	30	85
15	Estonia	—	27	24	27	78
16	Japan	24	—	25	26	75
17	Romania	—	29	23	21	73
18	Austria	—	—	26	25	51
19	Finland	26	—	—	23	49
20	Kazakhstan	23	—	—	22	47
21	China	25	—	—	16	41
22	Switzerland	—	—	—	20	20
23	Great Britain	—	—	—	19	19
24	Lithuania	—	—	—	18	18
25	South Korea	—	—	—	17	17
26	Latvia	—	—	—	15	15
