= 2011–12 Biathlon World Cup – World Cup 4 =

Coordinates: 50°42′N 10°44′E

The 2011–12 Biathlon World Cup – World Cup 4 was held in Oberhof, Germany, from 4 January until 8 January 2012. It was the fourth of nine scheduled events on the World Cup schedule, with both men and women competing in three different disciplines.

== Schedule of events ==
Date	Time	Events
January 4	18:15 CET	Women's 4 x 6 km Relay
January 5	18:20 CET	Men's 4 x 7.5 km Relay
January 6	18:30 CET	Women's 7.5 km Sprint
January 7	14:30 CET	Men's 10 km Sprint
January 8	13:30 CET	Women's 12.5 km Mass Start
January 8	15:30 CET	Men's 15 km Mass Start

== Medal winners ==
=== Men ===
Event:	Gold:	Time	Silver:	Time	Bronze:	Time
4 x 7.5 km Relay details	Italy; Christian de Lorenzi; Markus Windisch; Dominik Windisch; Lukas Hofer	1:30:49.1 (0+0) (0+1) (0+0) (0+1) (0+1) (0+1) (0+0) (0+1)	Russia; Anton Shipulin; Evgeniy Garanichev; Evgeny Ustyugov; Alexey Volkov	1:30:55.2 (0+0) (0+2) (0+2) (0+3) (0+0) (2+3) (0+2) (0+1)	Sweden; Tobias Arwidson; Björn Ferry; Fredrik Lindström; Carl Johan Bergman	1:31:21.8 (0+0) (0+0) (0+0) (0+1) (0+0) (0+1) (0+3) (0+1)
10 km Sprint details	Arnd Peiffer; Germany	25:57.5 (1+0)	Simon Fourcade; France	25:58.6 (0+0)	Evgeny Ustyugov; Russia	26:02.3 (0+0)
15 km Mass Start details	Andreas Birnbacher; Germany	38:34.6 (0+0+0+0)	Simon Fourcade; France	38:38.9 (0+1+0+0)	Emil Hegle Svendsen; Norway	39:04.2 (0+1+2+0)

=== Women ===
Event:	Gold:	Time	Silver:	Time	Bronze:	Time
4 x 6 km Relay details	Russia; Anna Bogaliy-Titovets; Svetlana Sleptsova; Olga Zaitseva; Olga Vilukhina	1:19:32.0 (0+2) (0+2) (0+2) (0+0) (0+3) (0+3) (0+0) (0+1)	Norway; Fanny Welle-Strand Horn; Elise Ringen; Synnøve Solemdal; Tora Berger	1:19:37.9 (0+0) (2+3) (0+1) (0+1) (0+2) (0+2) (0+1) (0+1)	France; Marie Dorin Habert; Anais Bescond; Marine Bolliet; Sophie Boilley	1:20:38.4 (0+1) (0+0) (1+3) (1+3) (0+1) (0+2) (0+0) (0+2)
7.5 km Sprint details	Magdalena Neuner; Germany	22:27.6 (0+0)	Darya Domracheva; Belarus	23:04.9 (0+1)	Olga Zaitseva; Russia	23:11.0 (0+0)
12.5 km Mass Start details	Magdalena Neuner; Germany	40:02.2 (1+1+1+0)	Tora Berger; Norway	40:14.7 (1+0+1+0)	Andrea Henkel; Germany	40:34.2 (1+0+0+0)

== Achievements ==
Best performance of all time

- Yuryi Liadov (BLR), 30th place in Sprint
- Milanko Petrovic (SRB), 61st place in Sprint
- Ville Simola (FIN), 63rd place in Sprint
- Stefan Gavrila (ROU), 76th place in Sprint
- Nastassia Dubarezava (BLR), 7th place in Sprint
- Natalya Burdyga (UKR), 8th place in Sprint
- Diana Rasimovičiūtė (LTU), 9th place in Sprint
- Marine Bolliet (FRA), 16th place in Sprint
- Laure Soulie (AND), 26th place in Sprint
- Ingela Andersson (SWE), 58th place in Sprint
- Seora Kim (KOR), 74th place in Sprint

First World Cup race

- Simon Kocevar (SLO), 80th place in Sprint
- Arturs Kolesnikovs (LAT), 91st place in Sprint
- Juliya Dzhyma (UKR), 34th place in Sprint
- Irene Cadurisch (SUI), 69th place in Sprint
- Eevamari Oksanen (FIN), 79th place in Sprint
- Yuki Nakajima (JPN), 81st place in Sprint
- Mika Torii (JPN), 84th place in Sprint
