= Rafał Lepel =

Polish biathlete

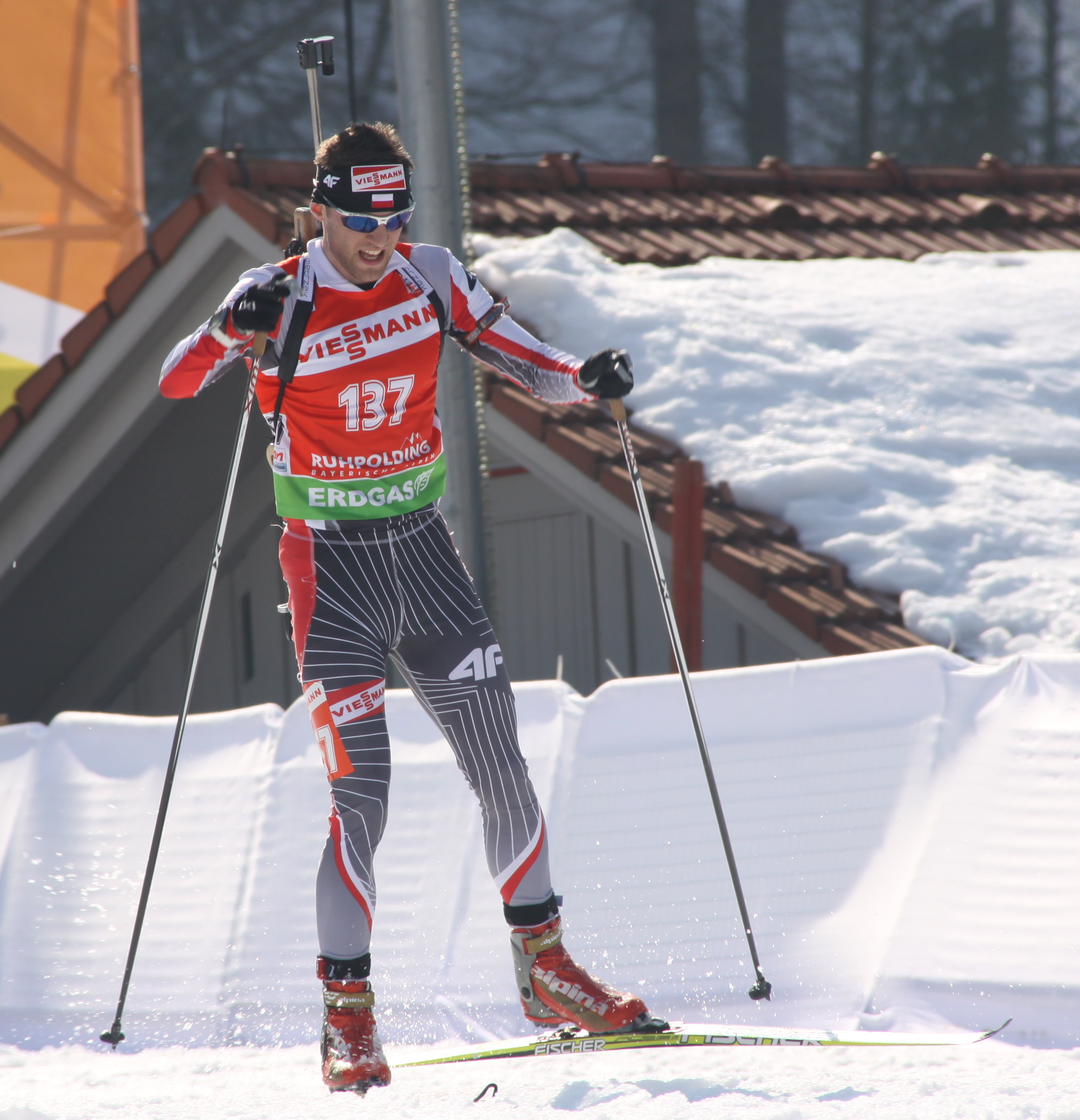

Personal information
- Nationality: Polish
- Born: 13 February 1990 (age 35)

Sport
- Sport: Biathlon

Rafał Lepel (born 13 February 1990) is a retired Polish biathlete. He competed at the Biathlon World Championships 2012 in Ruhpolding, in 10 km sprint. He competed at the 2014 Winter Olympics in Sochi, in the sprint contest.
