= 2011–12 Biathlon World Cup – World Cup 2 =

Coordinates: 47°28′N 12°37′E

The 2011–12 Biathlon World Cup – World Cup 2 is held in Hochfilzen, Austria, from 9 December until 11 December 2011.

== Schedule of events ==
The time schedule of the event stands below

Date	Time	Events
December 9	10:30 CET	Men's 10 km Sprint
December 9	14:30 CET	Women's 7.5 km Sprint
December 10	11:00 CET	Men's 12.5 km Pursuit
December 10	14:00 CET	Women's 4 x 6 km Relay
December 11	10:30 CET	Men's 4 x 7.5 km Relay
December 11	14:30 CET	Women's 10 km Pursuit

== Medal winners ==
=== Men ===
Event:	Gold:	Time	Silver:	Time	Bronze:	Time
10 km Sprint details	Carl Johan Bergman; Sweden	24:41.9 (0+0)	Andrei Makoveev; Russia	24:51.1 (0+0)	Benjamin Weger; Switzerland	25:01.5 (0+0)
12.5 km Pursuit details	Emil Hegle Svendsen; Norway	33:09.0 (1+0+1+0)	Tarjei Bø; Norway	33:09.1 (0+0+1+0)	Benjamin Weger; Switzerland	33:13.9 (1+0+0+0)
4 x 7.5 km Relay details	Norway; Rune Brattsveen; Lars Berger; Emil Hegle Svendsen; Tarjei Bø	1:14:52.9 (0+1) (0+3) (0+0) (1+3) (0+0) (0+0) (0+0) (0+0)	Russia; Anton Shipulin; Andrei Makoveev; Evgeny Ustyugov; Dimitry Malyshko	1:15:06.8 (0+0) (0+0) (0+0) (0+1) (0+1) (0+1) (0+2) (0+0)	France; Vincent Jay; Simon Fourcade; Alexis Bœuf; Martin Fourcade	1:15:23.9 (0+0) (0+2) (0+0) (0+0) (0+1) (0+0) (0+2) (0+1)

=== Women ===
Event:	Gold:	Time	Silver:	Time	Bronze:	Time
7.5 km Sprint details	Magdalena Neuner; Germany	21:09.2 (0+0)	Kaisa Mäkäräinen; Finland	21:24.1 (1+0)	Olga Zaitseva; Russia	21:31.9 (1+0)
10 km Pursuit details	Darya Domracheva; Belarus	29:34.4 (1+0+1+0)	Olga Zaitseva; Russia	29:34.7 (0+0+0+1)	Magdalena Neuner; Germany	29:37.5 (0+0+0+2)
4 x 6 km Relay details	Norway; Fanny Welle-Strand Horn; Elise Ringen; Synnøve Solemdal; Tora Berger	1:07:13.3 (0+2) (0+2) (0+1) (0+3) (0+0) (0+0) (0+0) (0+2)	France; Marie Laure Brunet; Anais Bescond; Sophie Boilley; Marie Dorin Habert	1:07:26.9 (0+0) (0+0) (0+1) (0+2) (0+0) (0+0) (0+0) (0+0)	Russia; Svetlana Sleptsova; Natalia Sorokina; Anna Bogaliy-Titovets; Olga Zaitseva	1:07:42.7 (0+3) (0+0) (0+3) (0+0) (0+0) (0+0) (0+0) (0+0)

== Achievements ==
Best performance for all time

- Andrei Makoveev (RUS), 2nd place in Sprint
- Florian Graf (GER), 7th place in Sprint
- Tomas Kaukėnas (LTU), 47th place in Sprint
- Miroslav Kenanov (BUL), 49th place in Sprint
- Rolands Puzulis (LAT), 95th place in Sprint
- Samuel Pulido Serrano (ESP), 104th place in Sprint
- Timofey Lapshin (RUS), 18th place in Pursuit
- Elise Ringen (NOR), 10th place in Sprint
- Laure Soulie (AND), 27th place in Sprint
- Marine Bolliet (FRA), 35th place in Sprint
- Bente Landheim (NOR), 44th place in Sprint and 27th in Pursuit
- Galina Vishnevskaya (KAZ), 83rd place in Sprint

First World Cup race

- Dmitry Malyshko (RUS), 10th place in Sprint
- Timofey Lapshin (RUS), 23rd place in Sprint
- Carolin Hennecke (GER), 25th place in Sprint
- Alexia Runggaldier (ITA), 61st place in Sprint
