= Timofey Lapshin =

Russian-South Korean biathlete (born 1988)

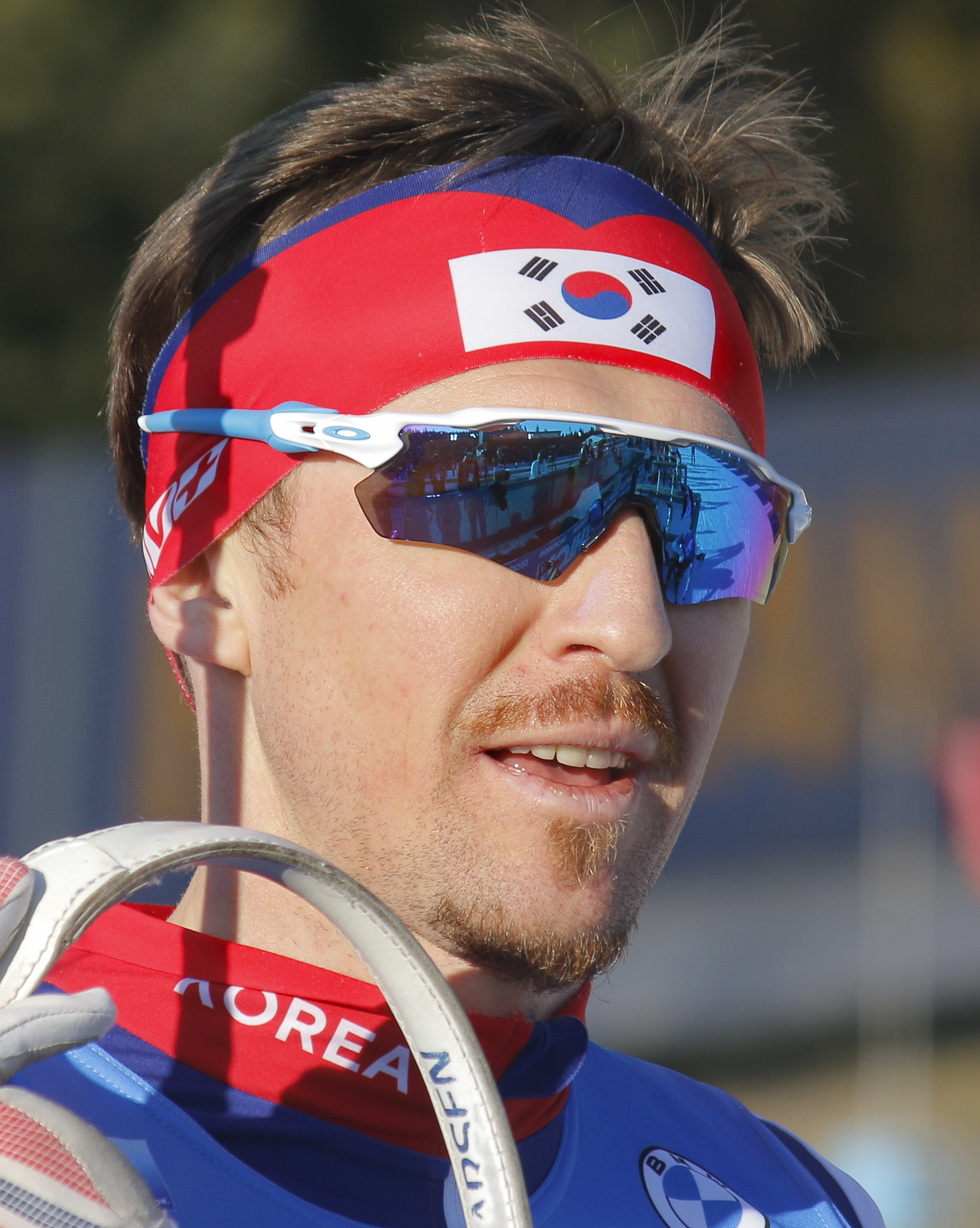

Personal information
- Full name: Timofey Lapshin
- Nationality: South Korean
- Born: 3 February 1988 (age 38) Krasnoyarsk, Russian SFSR, Soviet Union

Sport

Professional information
- Sport: Biathlon
- World Cup debut: 9 December 2011

Olympic Games
- Teams: 2 (2018, 2022)

World Championships
- Teams: 6 (2012, 2015, 2019)
- Medals: 0

World Cup
- Seasons: 8 (2011/12–)
- Individual victories: 0
- All victories: 2
- Individual podiums: 3
- All podiums: 6
Medal record
Men's biathlon
Representing Russia
Junior World Championships
Silver medal – second place	2009 Canmore	4 × 7.5 km relay
- Updated on 22 March 2015

Timofey Alekseyevich Lapshin (Russian: Тимофей Алексеевич Лапшин, Korean: 티모페이 알렉세예비치 랍신; born 3 February 1988) is a South Korean (since 2017) and Russian (until 2016) biathlete.

He debuted in the Biathlon World Cup on 9 December 2011 in Hochfilzen, Austria. He has won silver medal at Biathlon Junior World Championships.

Lapshin served a 12 month competition ban in 2021 for an anti-doping rule violation in relation to unintentional use of tuaminoheptane following reanalysis of a 2013 sample.

== Biathlon results ==
All results are sourced from the International Biathlon Union.

=== Olympic Games ===
0 medals

Event	Individual	Sprint	Pursuit	Mass start	Relay	Mixed relay
(South Korea) 2018 Pyeongchang	20th	16th	22nd	25th	—	—
(China) 2022 Beijing	76th	82nd	-	-	—	—

=== World Championships ===
0 medals

Event	Individual	Sprint	Pursuit	Mass start	Relay	Mixed relay	Single mixed relay
Representing Russia
(Germany) 2012 Ruhpolding	14th	—	—	—	—	—	—N/a
(Finland) 2015 Kontiolahti	58th	27th	40th	—	—	—	—N/a
Representing South Korea
(Sweden) 2019 Östersund	34th	79th	—	—	26th	20th	20th
(Italy) 2020 Rasen-Antholz	58th	17th	50th	—	27th	27th	16th
(Germany) 2023 Oberhof	66th	26th	38th	—	—	21st	25th
(Czech Republic) 2024 Nové Město na Moravě	25th	30th	35th	30th	24th	25th	15th

*During Olympic seasons competitions are only held for those events not included in the Olympic program.
