= 2011–12 Biathlon World Cup – World Cup 8 =

Coordinates: 62°46′N 29°51′E

The 2011–12 Biathlon World Cup – World Cup 8 will be held in Kontiolahti, Finland, from 10 February until 12 February 2012.

== Schedule of events ==
Date	Time	Events
February 10	12:00 CET	Mixed 2x6+2x7.5 km Relay
February 11	10:30 CET	Men's 10 km Sprint
February 11	12:30 CET	Women's 7.5 km Sprint
February 12	12:15 CET	Men's 12.5 km Pursuit
February 12	13:00 CET	Women's 10 km Pursuit

== Medal winners ==
=== Men ===
Event:	Gold:	Time	Silver:	Time	Bronze:	Time
10 km Sprint details	Martin Fourcade; France	24:58.2 (0+1)	Timofey Lapshin; Russia	24:59.0 (0+0)	Benjamin Weger; Switzerland	24:59.8 (0+0)
12.5 km Pursuit details	Ole Einar Bjørndalen; Norway	33:43.8 (2+0+0+0)	Martin Fourcade; France	33:57.6 (0+1+0+2)	Dmitry Malyshko; Russia	34:06.5 (1+0+1+0)

=== Women ===
Event:	Gold:	Time	Silver:	Time	Bronze:	Time
7.5 km Sprint details	Magdalena Neuner; Germany	23:07.4 (1+0)	Kaisa Mäkäräinen; Finland	23:19.7 (1+0)	Darya Domracheva; Belarus	23:24.4 (2+0)
10 km Pursuit details	Kaisa Mäkäräinen; Finland	32:23.0 (0+1+0+0)	Magdalena Neuner; Germany	32:58.9 (0+1+1+2)	Darya Domracheva; Belarus	33:00.0 (2+0+2+0)

=== Mixed ===
Event:	Gold:	Time	Silver:	Time	Bronze:	Time
2 x 6 km + 2 x 7.5 km Relay details	France; Sophie Boilley; Anais Bescond; Jean-Guillaume Béatrix; Vincent Jay	1:26:22.9 (0+0) (0+0) (0+3) (0+2) (0+0) (0+0) (0+0) (0+0)	Ukraine; Natalya Burdyga; Olena Pidhrushna; Andriy Deryzemlya; Serguei Sednev	1:26:23.9 (0+0) (0+0) (0+0) (0+0) (0+0) (0+2) (0+1) (0+1)	Slovakia; Jana Gerekova; Anastasiya Kuzmina; Matej Kazar; Miroslav Matiaško	1:27:06.5 (0+1) (0+3) (0+1) (0+2) (0+0) (0+0) (0+0) (0+1)

== Achievements ==
Best performance for all time

- Timofey Lapshin (RUS), 2nd place in Sprint
- Christian Stebler (SUI), 22nd place in Sprint
- Erik Lesser (GER), 23rd place in Sprint and 22nd in Pursuit
- Aliaksandr Babchyn (BLR), 24th place in Sprint
- Karolis Zlatkauskas (LTU), 49th place in Sprint
- Haibin Chen (CHN), 72nd place in Sprint
- Arturs Kolesnikovs (LAT), 84th place in Sprint
- Edin Hodzic (SRB), 85th place in Sprint
- Dmitry Malyshko (RUS), 3rd place in Pursuit
- Matej Kazar (SVK), 17th place in Pursuit
- Lukas Kristejn (CZE), 44th place in Pursuit
- Juliya Dzhyma (UKR), 19th place in Sprint
- Yan Zhang (CHN), 64th place in Sprint
- Anete Brice (LAT), 79th place in Sprint
- Kadri Lehtla (EST), 18th place in Pursuit
- Anastasia Zagoruiko (RUS), 26th place in Pursuit

First World Cup race

- Lukas Kristejn (CZE), 56th place in Sprint
- Michal Krcmar (CZE), 73rd place in Sprint
- Anastasia Zagoruiko (RUS), 44th place in Sprint
