= Bente Landheim =

Norwegian biathlete

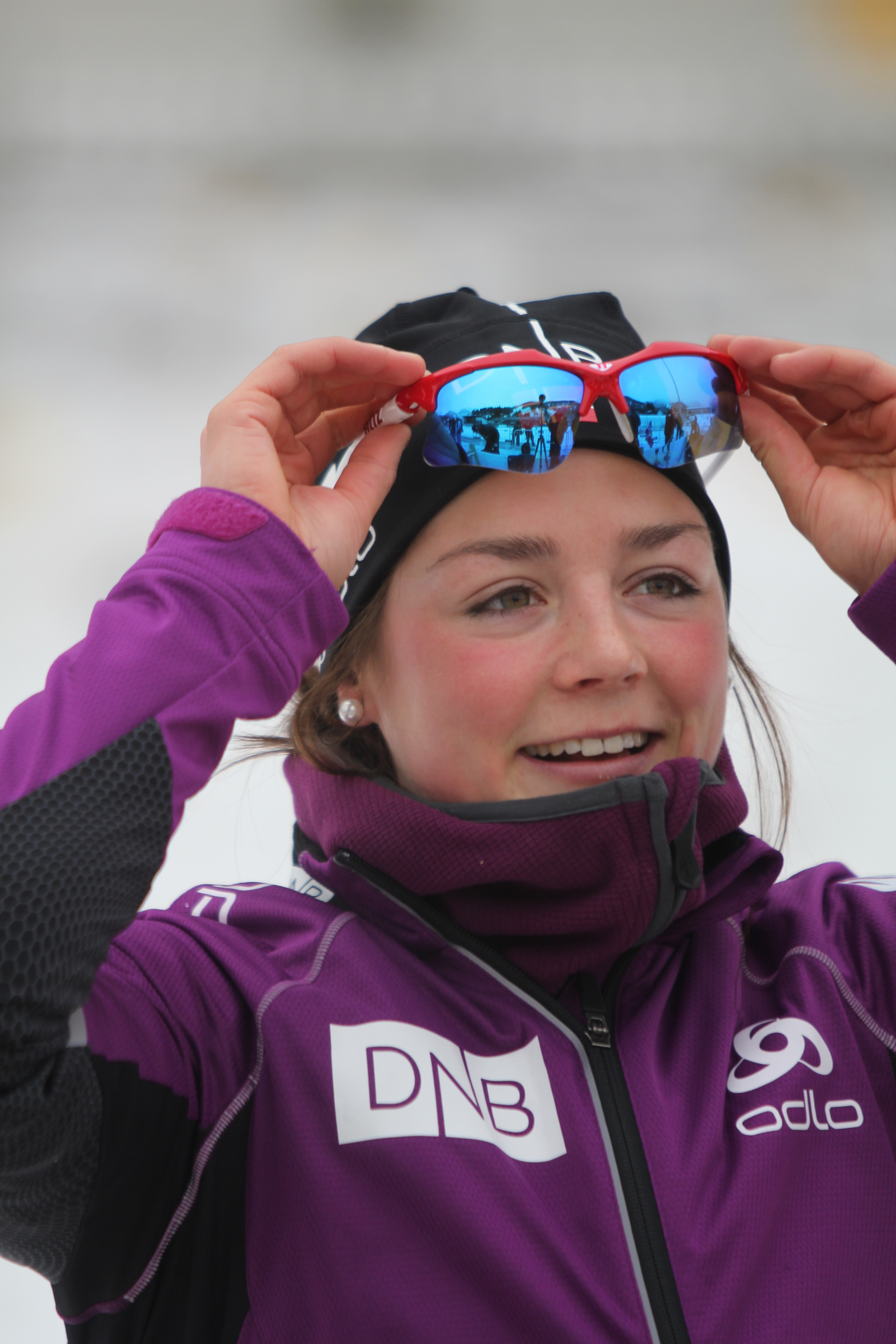
- Landheim in 2011

Personal information
- Born: 25 May 1990 (age 36)

Sport

Professional information
- Sport: Biathlon
- Club: Tynset IF
- World Cup debut: 2011

World Championships
- Teams: 1 (2012)
- Medals: 0
Medal record
Women's biathlon
Representing Norway
European Championships
Bronze medal – third place	2014 Nové Město	4 x 6 km relay
Bronze medal – third place	2016 Tuymen	Mixed 2 x 6 + 2 x 7.5 km relay

Bente Landheim (born 1990) is a Norwegian biathlete.

She competed at the Biathlon World Championships 2012, and won bronze medal in the relay at the Biathlon European Championships 2014, and in mixed relay at the 2016 IBU Open European Championships.
