= Evgeny Ustyugov =

Russian biathlete (born 1985)

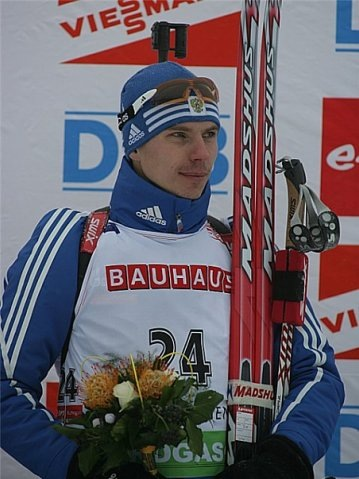

Personal information
- Full name: Evgeny Romanovich Ustyugov
- Born: 4 June 1985 (age 41) Krasnoyarsk, RSFSR, Soviet Union
- Height: 1.68 m (5 ft 6 in)

Sport

Professional information
- Sport: Biathlon
- World Cup debut: 8 January 2009
- Retired: 5 April 2014

Olympic Games
- Teams: 2 (2010, 2014)
- Medals: 0 (0 gold)

World Championships
- Teams: 4 (2009, 2011, 2012, 2013)
- Medals: 2 (0 gold)

World Cup
- Seasons: 6 (2008/09–2013/14)
- Individual victories: 3
- All victories: 6
- Individual podiums: 12
- All podiums: 24
- Discipline titles: 1: 1 Mass start (2009–10)
Medal record
Event	1st	2nd	3rd
Olympic Games	0	0	0
Biathlon World Championships	0	0	0
Biathlon European Championships	0	1	0
Total	0	1	0
Men's biathlon
Representing Russia
Olympic Games
Disqualified	2010 Vancouver	15 km mass start
Disqualified	2014 Sochi	4 × 7.5 km relay
Disqualified	2010 Vancouver	4 × 7.5 km relay
World Championships
Disqualified	2011 Khanty-Mansiysk	15 km mass start
Disqualified	2011 Khanty-Mansiysk	4 × 7.5 km relay
European Championships
Silver medal – second place	2009 Ufa	10 km sprint
Disqualified	2011 Ridanna	20 km individual
Junior World Championships
Gold medal – first place	2006 Presque Isle	15 km individual
Gold medal – first place	2006 Presque Isle	12.5 km pursuit
Silver medal – second place	2006 Presque Isle	4 × 7.5 km relay

Evgeny Romanovich Ustyugov (Russian: Евгений Романович Устюгов; born 4 June 1985) is a Russian former biathlete. Born to cross-country skiers, Ustyugov was introduced to biathlon at the age of three. He started his career in junior tournaments in 2005, before going professional three years later in the European Championships. He was Olympic champion in the men's 15 km mass start event at the 2010 Winter Olympics in Vancouver, British Columbia, Canada until the win was revoked for doping violations. Prior to the 2010 Olympic Games, his best World Championship finish in an individual event was 20th place.

Together with Anton Shipulin, Alexey Volkov and Dmitry Malyshko he won the gold medal in the men's relay at the 2014 Winter Olympics, in Sochi, Russia. After the end of the 2013–14 World Cup, Ustyugov announced his retirement.

In February 2020, it was announced that because of a doping violation he had been disqualified from all results in the 2013–14 season, including the 2014 Olympics. In October 2020 it was revealed that due to new testing his Vancouver 2010 medal would also be revoked due to doping. In November 2024, almost 15 years after the Vancouver Olympic Games, the CAS rejected Ustyugov's appeal for the deprivation of the Olympic gold medal. In May 2025, the decision of the Swiss Federal Tribunal was to reject the appeals of Ustyugov leaving the International Olympic Committee to formally reallocate Ustyugov's medals — a gold and a bronze from 2010 and a relay gold from 2014 — to other athletes. In September 2025 the IOC Executive Board approved the medal reallocations. The medals were officially reawarded at the Milano Cortina Olympic Winter Games on 15 February 2026 in the Antholz-Anterselva Biathlon Arena after the regularly scheduled pursuit race (men) was finished.

== Early life ==
Evgeny Ustyugov was born in Krasnoyarsk, Soviet Union, on 4 June 1985, to an athletic family; his mother Olga Rudolfovna and father Roman Valeryevich were professional cross-country skier. Ustygov and his brother Alexander began skiing at the age of three. Ustyugov did not participate on club sports as they were too distant from home. For a long time skiing, and also climbing and Alpine skiing were his hobbies. In school he often participated on sport events. He discovered biathlon in the 1997 event "Pionerskaya Pravda" (Пионерская Правда). His family agreed upon Ustygov's wish to become a professional biathlete; his first coach was Viktor Ermakov.

== Career ==
=== Early career ===
Ustyugov competed his first junior championship in Kontiolahti, Finland, in 2005, reaching 12th place in the individual and 42nd and 36th in the sprint and pursuit competitions, respectively. At the Biathlon Youth World Championships in Presque Isle, Maine he was second in the relay, first in the individual and pursuit, and fourth in the sprint. At the European Championships in Langdorf-Arbersee Ustyugov won the relay competition.

=== 2007–08 season ===
The first junior "Izhevsk Rifle" (Ижевская винтовка), a national individual tournament, took place in December 2007. Ustyugov was second, with two misses and +0:39 time difference between himself and the winner, Andrey Dubasov.

At the first stage of the new season, Ustyugov participated in all events at the European Championships in Geilo, Norway. In sprint, he became 32nd with two misses, half a minute behind the Norwegian Kokon Andersen. At the second sprint event, Ustyugov was 36th, producing four misses and being 2 minutes behind the winner, the German Daniel Graf. In the second stage of the championships, in Torsby, Sweden, he also participated on all events. In the sprint event he became 37th with two misses, 2 minutes behind the Russian Andrei Prokunin.

In the pursuit event, Ustygov became 23rd, 3 minutes and 37 seconds behind Prokunin. The third stage took place in Obertilliach, Austria, where he was 2nd at the individual event, making two misses. The winner was Frenchman Jean Frederic, who was four seconds behind Ustyugov. As a sprinter Ustyugov was 12th, missing one target and being 1 minute and 7 seconds ahead of the winner, Prokunin. In April 2008, Ustyogv was part of the Krasnoyarsk Krai relay composed of Nikolay Kozlov, Kiril Sherbakov and Oleg Milovanov. They were awarded the silver medal at the 2008 Russian Championships.

=== 2008–09 season ===
In this season, Ustyugov only competed on two stages at the European Championships – at the second in Obertilliach, and at the third in Martell, Italia. In Obertilliach, he was fourth in the individual competition, 1 minute and 48 seconds behind the winner Lars Berger, missing three targets. In sprint he became 13th, missing 3 targets. First was the Norwegian Hans Martin Gjedrem, who was 1 minute and 31 seconds ahead Ustyugov. In Martell he skipped the pursuit and only started in the sprint event. He won the sprint competition, without making any misses. Second was the Norwegian Frode Andresen, who was 16 and a half seconds behind the champion.

Ustyugov left out the pursuit competition as he was on the way to the "Izhevsk Rifle". The event took place on 27 December 2008 in Novosibirsk as opposed to Udmurtia in the previous year. In individual he missed one target, but was eventually 26 seconds ahead runner-up, Russia's ex-captain Sergei Rozhkov. Thanks to the good results in this season, Ustyugov could compete at the Biathlon World Championships and the next World Championships.

The man debuted at the 2008–09 Biathlon World Cup in Oberhof on 8 January 2009. In the relay competition he replaced Ivan Tcherezov, who suffered from a high haemoglobin level. Ustyugov only got to know it about one hour before the start. Although he was second behind Norwegian Emil Hegle Svendsen, the Russian team's second place was nullified because Dmitri Yaroshenko was positively tested for doping. He finished his debut season in Khanty-Mansiysk, Russia, as seventh – his best result at that time.

Although finishing in Ruhpolding 22nd and 29th in pursuit and spring, respectively, Ustyugov came 8th at the World Championships sprint event in Rasen-Antholz, Italy. At the ninth and last stage in Khanty-Mansisk, Ustyugov started as sixth, missed tree targets, and finished seventh at the pursuit event.

At the 2009 Russian Championships, Ustyugov participated at three from five races. He was sixth at the sprint, eleventh at the pursuit, and ninth at the relay competition, in the latter as a part with the Krasnoyarsk Krai team.

At the European Championships in Ufa, Russia, Ustyugov participated at the sprint and pursuit events. At the first, he came in second, 11 second behind Norwegian Rune Brattsveen, missing one target. In pursuit, Ustyugov finished 11th with four misses, 1 minute and 32 behind the German winner Daniel Böhm.

=== 2009–10 season ===
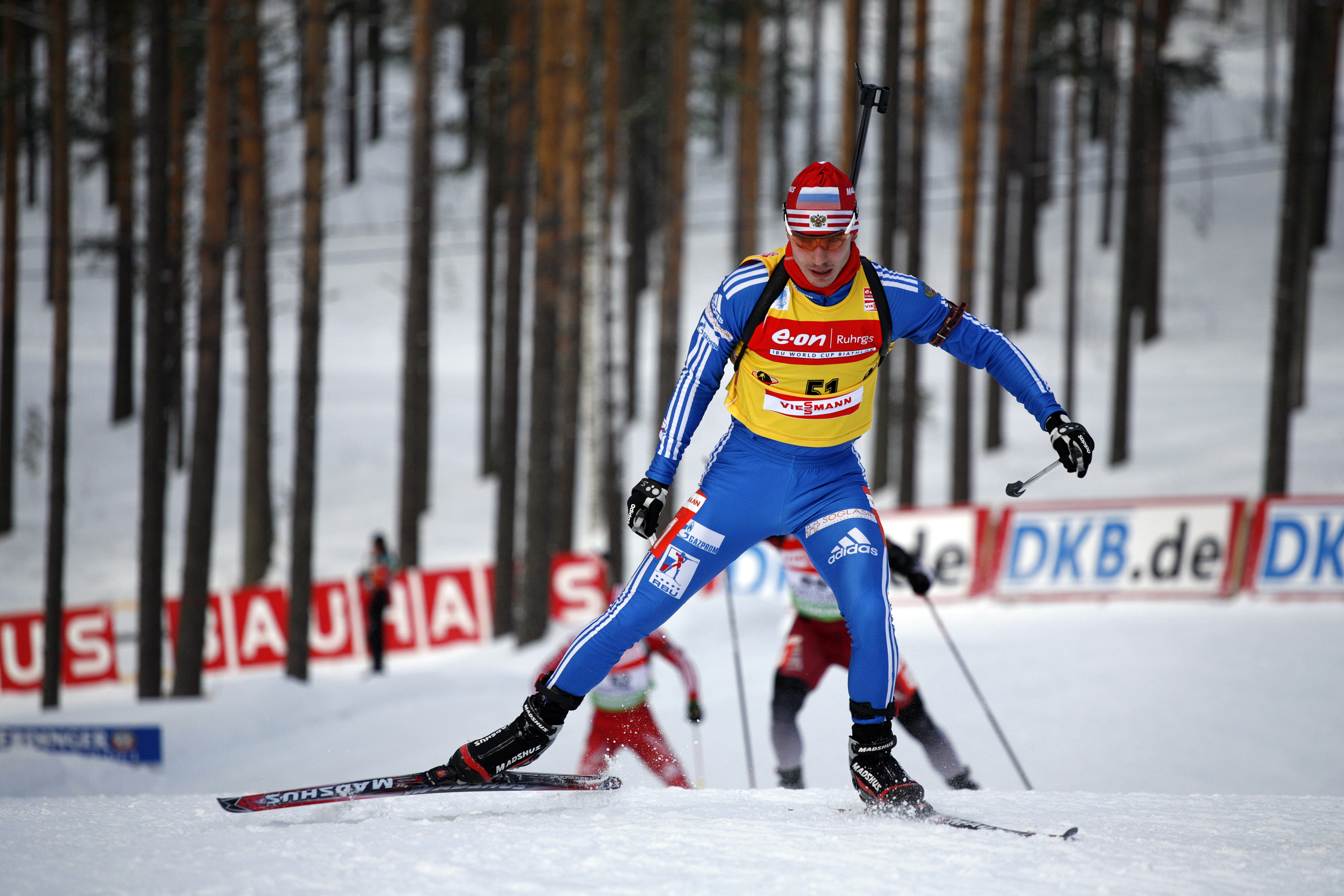
Ustyugov wore a yellow jersey, marking the overall leader at the 10 km sprint event in Kontiolahti, Finland, 13 March 2010

On 11 December 2009, Ustyugov was third in the sprint event in Hochfilzen. Nine days later he won the pursuit stage in Pokljuka, and on 9 January he also won the sprint event in Oberhof, despite missing three targets. On 27 March 2010, Ustuygov was awarded the Crystal Globe for his mass start performance. Counting the overall points from the previous events, he got 197, second behind to Svendsen, who had 34 points.

At the end of the 2009–10 season, Ustyugov was fourth in the overall ranking, behind Ivan Tcherezov, Christoph Sumann and Svendsen, but first in the Russian ranking list, earning 1275 points. The skier was nominated at the 2010 Biathlon World Awards in the category "Best Biathlete 2010", with Svendsen, Sumann, Björn Ferry and Vincent Jay. Svendsen became the winner. Because of troubles with his rifle, Ustyugov was 47th at the sprint event in Rasen-Antholz. At the 2010 Russian Championships, he only participated in the relay competition, finishing 8th as a member of the Krasnoyarsk team.

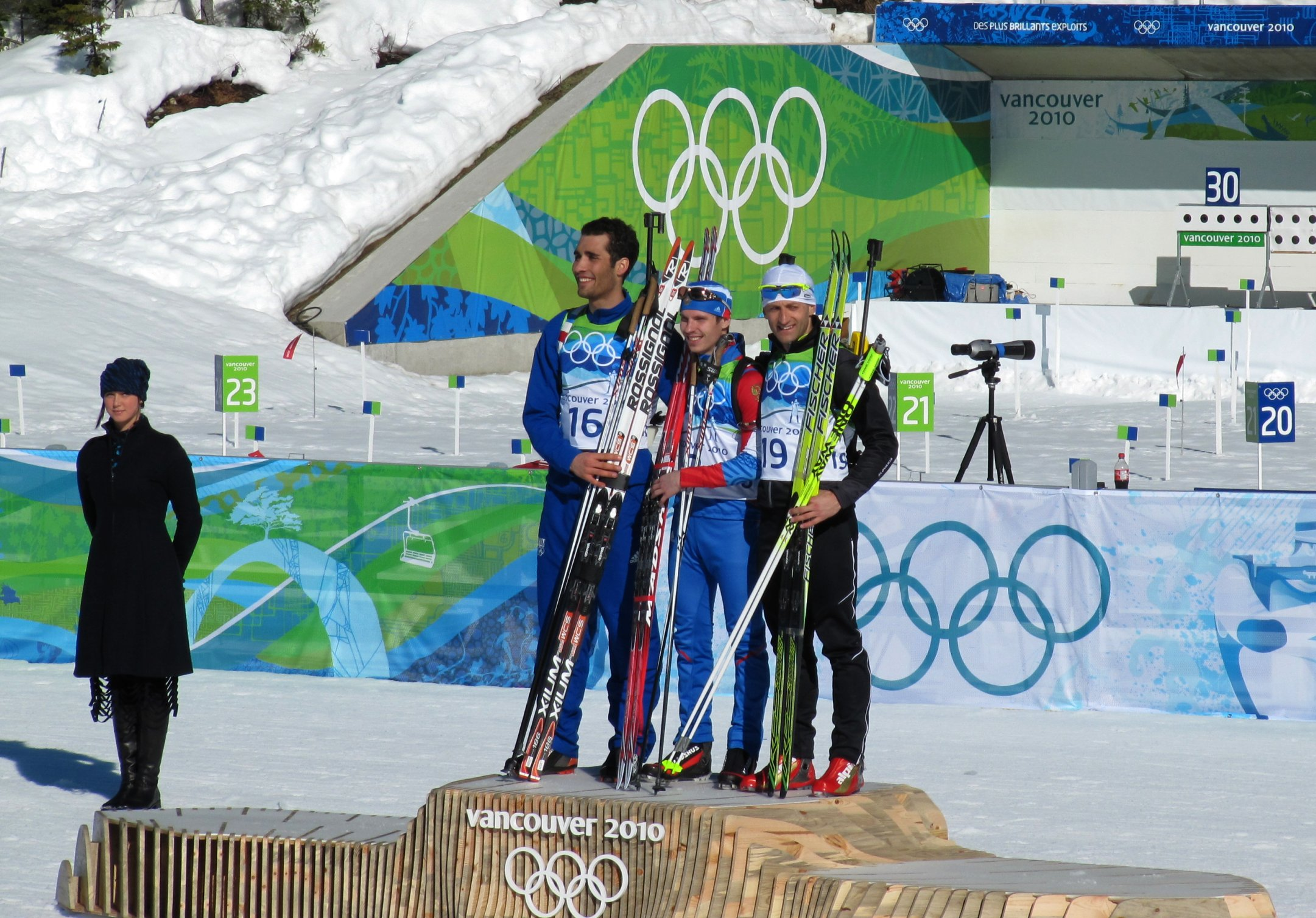
Ustuygov won the 15 km mass start competition on 21 February 2010 in Vancouver.

Men's biathlon at the Olympic Games started with the spring competition on 14 February 2010. Then-coach Vladimir Barnashov suggested that snow and rain influenced the skier's performance. Ustuyugov missed two targets and finished 15th, 1 minute and 40 seconds behind winner Vincent Jay. Two days later, he achieved the same result in the pursuit event, but now missing four targets. If counting the time only, Ustyugov finished third behind only Dominik Landertinger and Christoph Sumann. On 18 February, Ustuygov came in fourth in the individual event; winner was Emil Svendsen, who 49 seconds faster than Ustyugov.

Ustyugov became the first Russian since 1996 to win the mass start event on 21 February. Up to that date, no Russian could win gold in this discipline at neither World Championships nor Olympic Games. Silver went to the French Martin Fourcade, and bronze to the Slovak Pavol Hurajt. His relay team – Ivan Tcherezov, Anton Shipulin, Maxim Tchoudov – received the bronze medal on 26 February.The Austrian team came in second,0.2 seconds faster than the Russians. Norway won this competition.

=== 2010–11 season ===
Ustyugov's relay team finished 14th at the fourth stage of the 2010–11 Biathlon World Cup in Oberhof. The last skier in the Russian team, he was third before the last shooting until producing eight misses and subsequently running five penalty loops. He was seventh in the individual competition in Ruhpolding, around 1 minute ahead winner Emil Svendsen. In the pursuit event he received an injury on his left forearm, finishing 31st.

In the individual race of the 2011 European Championships, Ustuygov received the silver medal, missing three targets. Winner was the Ukrainian Artem Pryma, who was 9.7 seconds faster than Ustyugov. Ustuygov stated that he won't participate in the next European Championships due to conditions of growth.

At the Biathlon World Championships 2011 in Khanty-Mansisk, Ustyugov won two silver medals; first in relay with Anton Shipulin, Maxim Maximov, and Ivan Tcherezov, second in mass start, losing there to Emil Svendsen. After the final shooting he had 10-seconds advantage to Svendsen, but the latter overtook him with 5 seconds advantage.

Ustyugov got an invitation for the fun event, the World Team Challenge, which was reschuled in March 2011 because the stadium's roof collapsed in December 2010. The Russian pair, Ustyugov and Svetlana Sleptsova, won the event, beating Germans Katrin Hitzer and Florian Graf by 11.5 seconds.

=== 2011–12 season ===
On 10 June 2011, Ustyugov was made honorary citizen of Krasnoyarsk, becoming the youngest person in the city's history to receive this honour.

At the first stage of the 2011–12 Biathlon World Cup on 30 November 2011, Ustyugov finished fifth in the 20 km individual event in Östersund, Sweden. After the race, he noted: "Today it was hard to start as the beginner in the first race; still, I could not manage my excitement. Short: it is hard to start first. Ustyugov was third at the sprint event in Oberhof, Germany, on 7 January 2012, shooting down all targets. After the fifth stage, he climbed up to the 8th rank in the world ranking list.

Ustyugov, who took up the 13th position in sprint in Nové Město, Czech Republic, commented his result: "My well-being was good – I skied almost synchronously with the leaders. Condition and skis were just great. At the slope, even Simon Fourcade could not overtake me".

== Personal life ==
=== Graduation ===
Ustyugov intended to enrol to the Physical Faculty for Culture at the Pedagogical Institute, but his grades hindered enrolment. He then sent his documents to the Divnogorsk Olympic Reserve School. A year later after taking the documents and handing in the required exams, he was enrolled at a daily mechanical faculty at the Siberian State Technological University. Bearing the difficult subjects and the physical overwork in mind he chose a different faculty, forest engineering, and studied extramurally (outside of the university). On 21 June 2010 he received a diploma by the Siberian State Technological University in forest engineering.

=== Family ===
On 28 August 2009, Ustyugov married professional biathlete Alexandra Bondarenko. She gave birth to Veronika Ustyugova on 20 September 2010.

== Biathlon results ==
All results are sourced from the International Biathlon Union.

=== Olympic Games ===
Event	Individual	Sprint	Pursuit	Mass start	Relay	Mixed relay
(Canada) 2010 Vancouver	DSQ (4th)	15th	15th	DSQ (1st)	DSQ (3rd)	—N/a
(Russia) 2014 Sochi	38th	16th	5th	19th	DSQ (1st)	—

*Mass start was added as an event in 2006, with the mixed relay being added in 2014.

=== World Championships ===
Event	Individual	Sprint	Pursuit	Mass start	Relay	Mixed relay
(South Korea) 2009 Pyeongchang	55th	47th	20th	—	6th	—
(Russia) 2011 Khanty-Mansiysk	13th	29th	12th	DSQ (2nd)	DSQ (2nd)	6th
(Germany) 2012 Ruhpolding	50th	30th	DNS	10th	—	—
(Czech Republic) 2013 Nové Město	48th	9th	16th	16th	4th	—

*During Olympic seasons competitions are only held for those events not included in the Olympic program.

=== Junior/Youth World Championships ===
3 medals (2 gold, 1 silver)

Event	Individual	Sprint	Pursuit	Relay
(Finland) 2005 Kontiolahti	12th	42nd	36th	—
(United States) 2006 Presque Isle	Gold	4th	Gold	Silver

=== Individual victories ===
2 victories (1 Sp, 1 Pu)

Season	Date	Location	Discipline	Level
2009–10; 3 victories (1 Sp, 1 Pu)	20 December 2009	(Slovenia) Pokljuka	12.5 km pursuit	Biathlon World Cup
2009–10; 3 victories (1 Sp, 1 Pu)	9 January 2010	(Germany) Oberhof	10 km sprint	Biathlon World Cup

*Results are from UIPMB and IBU races which include the Biathlon World Cup, Biathlon World Championships and the Winter Olympic Games.
