= Carl Johan Bergman =

Swedish biathlete (born 1978)

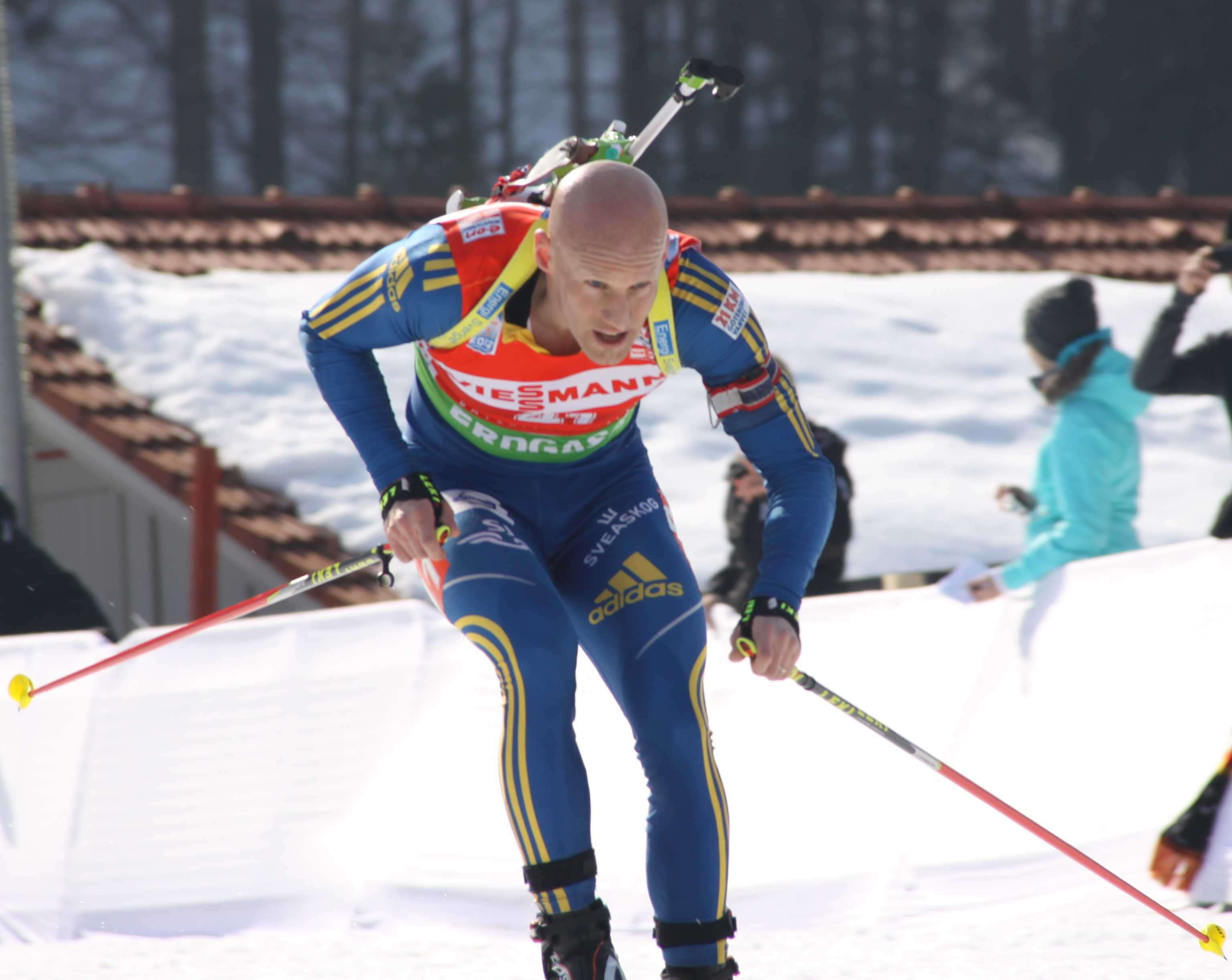
- Carl Johan Bergman in March 2012 during the World Championships in Ruhpolding, Bavaria, Germany.

Personal information
- Full name: Carl Johan Bergman
- Born: 14 March 1978 (age 48) Ekshärad, Sweden
- Height: 1.74 m (5 ft 9 in)
- Website: cjbergman.com

Sport

Professional information
- Sport: Biathlon
- Club: Ekshärhad SF
- World Cup debut: 9 January 2000
- Retired: 23 March 2014

Olympic Games
- Teams: 4 (2002, 2006, 2010, 2014)
- Medals: 1

World Championships
- Teams: 11 (2001, 2003, 2004, 2005, 2006, 2007, 2008, 2010, 2011, 2012, 2013)
- Medals: 6 (1 gold)

World Cup
- Seasons: 15 (1999/00–2013/14)
- Individual victories: 3
- All victories: 7
- Individual podiums: 13
- All podiums: 25
Medal record
Men's biathlon
Representing Sweden
International biathlon competitions
Event	1st	2nd	3rd
World Championships	1	2	3
Total	1	2	3
Olympic Games
Bronze medal – third place	2010 Vancouver	4 × 7.5 km relay
World Championships
Gold medal – first place	2007 Antholz-Anterselva	Mixed relay
Silver medal – second place	2009 Pyeongchang	Mixed relay
Silver medal – second place	2012 Ruhpolding	12.5 km pursuit
Bronze medal – third place	2010 Khanty-Mansiysk	Mixed relay
Bronze medal – third place	2011 Khanty-Mansiysk	4 × 7.5 km relay
Bronze medal – third place	2012 Rupholding	10 km sprint

Carl Johan Bergman (born 14 March 1978) is a former Swedish biathlete. He lives in Lillehammer, Norway with his Norwegian wife, Liv Kjersti Eikeland. He is 5 ft 8 1/2 in (174.0 cm), and weighs 152 pounds (69 kg; 10 st 12 lb).

He studies computer science at the Norwegian University of Science and Technology in Trondheim. His mother is called Birgitta, his father is Lennart, and he has a younger sister called Johanna.

In March 2014, Bergman confirmed that he would be retiring from the sport at the end of the 2013–14 season.

== World Cup ==
Bergman has been competing in the World Cup since 2001–02. During his career he has finished the overall season in 61st (2001–02), 40th (2002–03), 24th (2003–04), 14th (2004–05), and he finished the 2005–06 season in 11th place.

The 2005–06 season was Bergmans best season, he finished 11th in the overall standings, 375 points behind champion Ole Einar Bjørndalen, and 256 behind second place Raphaël Poirée. He was only 33 points behind Michael Greis who was tenth, which would have been disappointing for Bergman as the top ten biathletes have all their travel and accommodation costs covered by the IBU. Bergman came tenth in the sprint standings, 63 points behind Tomasz Sikora. He was eighth in the pursuit standings, 118 points behind Bjørndalen. In the individual standings he came 30th, 110 behind Greis, and in the mass start he was 23rd, 130 points behind Bjørndalen.

Bergman also claimed his first World Cup win in the 2005–06 season, in a sprint race in Kontiolahti, after hitting all ten targets he finished 6.5 seconds ahead of Sikora, and 12.5 seconds ahead of Sven Fischer, who came third. That season he also finished third twice (pursuit and sprint in Pokljuka), fourth once, fifth twice, and sixth once.

== Olympics ==
Bergman had a disappointing 2006 Winter Olympics. He was selected for all five events, but except for the relay in which Sweden came fourth, he failed to finish inside the top twenty in any of the events. Bergman put it down to having a bad stomach. In the first event, the 20 km individual, Bergman finished 23rd, he hit 17/20 targets, and was 3:07.9 behind winner Michael Greis. In the 10 km sprint, he was 53rd,3:09.9 behind Sven Fischer, even though he hit all ten targets. Bergman decided not to compete in the 12.5 km pursuit. The next event was the relay, Sweden finished fourth, 43.6 second behind Germany, then in the final event, the 15 km mass start, Bergman finished 29th, 3:34.4 behind Greis, hitting 16/20 targets. He also competed in the 2002 Winter Olympics. He took part in the individual (40th), sprint (28th), pursuit (36th), and Sweden came 14th in the relay.

In 2026, his 2010 relay 4th was turned into a bronze medal with the disqualification of the Russian team.

== Shooting ==
His shooting average has been in the low 80% range for the last few years. In 1999–00 it was only 73%, with an 83% prone average but a 64% standing average. He improved for the next two years averaging 75% in 2000–01 and 87% in 2001–02. But in 2002–03 it was down to 81%, and then 83% in 2003–04. In 2004–05 he averaged 83% again, making him the 24th-best shot on the tour. His average increased again in 2005–06, to 85% (86% prone, 83% standing), after hitting 314/369 targets, making him the 15th-best shot in the World Cup.

== Biathlon results ==
All results are sourced from the International Biathlon Union.

=== Olympic Games ===
Event	Individual	Sprint	Pursuit	Mass start	Relay	Mixed relay
(United States) 2002 Salt Lake City	40th	28th	36th	—N/a	14th	—N/a
(Italy) 2006 Turin	23rd	53rd	DNS	29th	4th	—N/a
(Canada) 2010 Vancouver	61st	42nd	19th	—	Bronze	—N/a
(Russia) 2014 Sochi	37th	24th	34th	—	10th	—

*Mass start was added as an event in 2006, with the mixed relay being added in 2014.

=== World Championships ===
5 medals (1 gold, 2 silver, 3 bronze)

Event	Individual	Sprint	Pursuit	Mass start	Relay	Mixed relay
(Slovenia) 2001 Pokljuka	DNS	66th	—	—	16th	—N/a
(Russia) 2003 Khanty-Mansiysk	75th	27th	27th	—	7th	—N/a
(Germany) 2004 Oberhof	9th	36th	21st	28th	6th	—N/a
(Austria) 2005 Hochfilzen	39th	8th	11th	15th	7th	13th
(Slovenia) 2006 Pokljuka	—N/a	—N/a	—N/a	—N/a	—N/a	6th
(Italy) 2007 Antholz-Anterselva	39th	34th	23rd	—	7th	Gold
(Sweden) 2008 Östersund	24th	28th	29th	—	6th	4th
(South Korea) 2009 Pyeongchang	—	79th	—	27th	9th	Silver
(Russia) 2010 Khanty-Mansiysk	—N/a	—N/a	—N/a	—N/a	—N/a	Bronze
(Russia) 2011 Khanty-Mansiysk	11th	47th	28th	29th	Bronze	4th
(Germany) 2012 Ruhpolding	—	Bronze	Silver	6th	16th	—
(Czech Republic) 2013 Nové Město	35th	54th	34th	—	11th	—

*During Olympic seasons competitions are only held for those events not included in the Olympic program.
**The mixed relay was added as an event in 2005.

=== Individual victories ===
3 victories (3 Sp)

Season	Date	Location	Discipline	Level
2005–06; 1 victory (1 Sp)	16 March 2006	(Finland) Kontiolahti	10 km sprint	Biathlon World Cup
2011–12; 2 victories (2 Sp)	2 December 2011	(Sweden) Östersund	10 km sprint	Biathlon World Cup
2011–12; 2 victories (2 Sp)	9 December 2011	(Austria) Hochfilzen	10 km sprint	Biathlon World Cup

*Results are from UIPMB and IBU races which include the Biathlon World Cup, Biathlon World Championships and the Winter Olympic Games.
