= Lars Berger =

Norwegian biathlete and cross-country skier

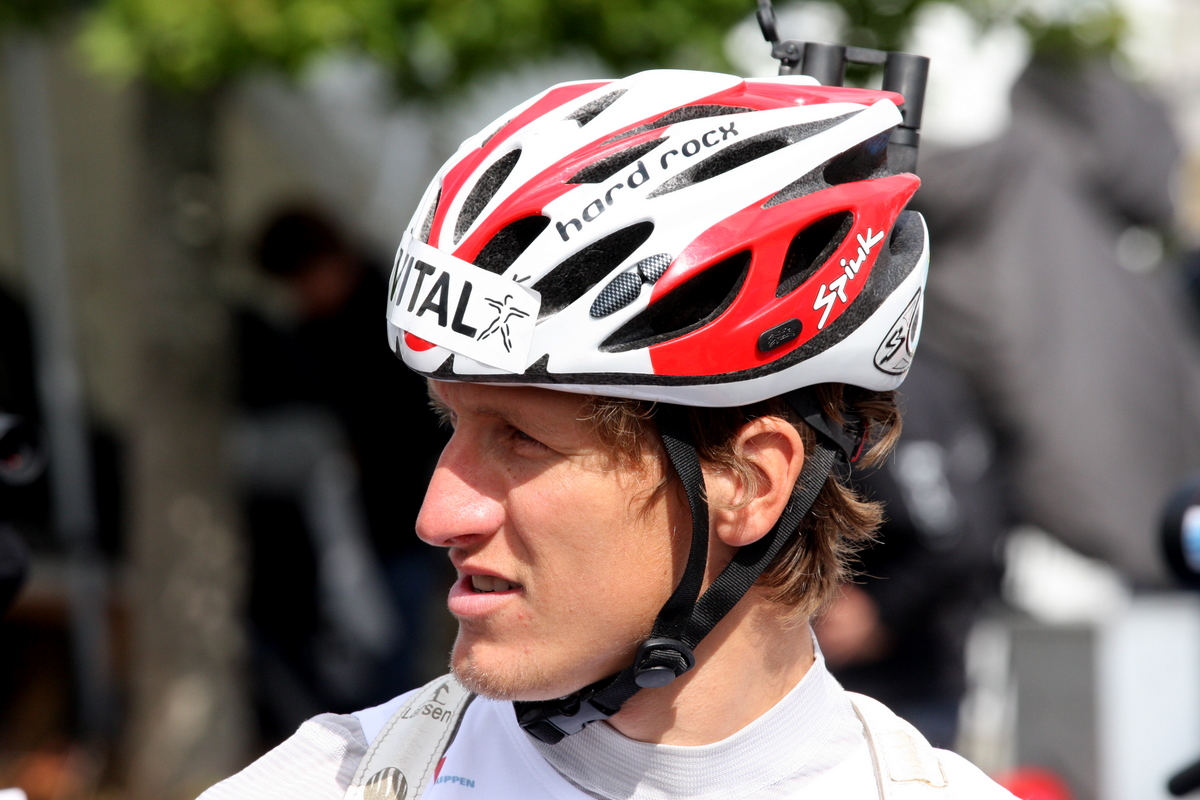

Personal information
- Full name: Lars Berger
- Born: 1 May 1979 (age 47) Levanger Municipality, Norway
- Height: 1.89 m (6 ft 2 in)

Sport

Professional information
- Sport: Biathlon; Cross-country skiing
- Club: Dombås IL; Byåsen IL
- World Cup debut: 4 January 2001; 22 November 2003
- Retired: 27 April 2015

Olympic Games
- Teams: 1 (2010); 1 (2010)
- Medals: 0; 1 (0 gold)

World Championships
- Teams: 7 (2004, 2005, 2006, 2007, 2009, 2011, 2012); 2 (2005, 2007)
- Medals: 5 (1 gold); 3 (3 gold)

World Cup
- Seasons: 14 (2000/01–2013/14)
- Individual victories: 7 (biathlon); 0 (cross-country skiing)
- All victories: 11 (biathlon); 1 (cross-country skiing)
- Individual podiums: 16 (biathlon); 1 (cross-country skiing)
- All podiums: 27 (biathlon); 2 (cross-country skiing)
Medal record
Men's biathlon
Representing Norway
World Championships
Gold medal – first place	2009 Pyeongchang	4 × 7.5 km relay
Silver medal – second place	2004 Oberhof	15 km mass start
Silver medal – second place	2004 Oberhof	4 × 7.5 km relay
Silver medal – second place	2007 Antholz-Anterselva	4 × 7.5 km relay
Silver medal – second place	2009 Pyeongchang	10 km sprint
Men's cross-country skiing
Representing Norway
Olympic Games
Silver medal – second place	2010 Vancouver	4 × 10 km relay
World Championships
Gold medal – first place	2005 Oberstdorf	4 × 10 km relay
Gold medal – first place	2007 Sapporo	15 km
Gold medal – first place	2007 Sapporo	4 × 10 km relay

Lars Berger (born 1 May 1979) is a former Norwegian biathlete and cross-country skier.

== Life and career ==
Fellow former biathlete Tora Berger is his sister. Berger's family moved to Lesja Municipality in Oppland county in 1985. At the age of six, Berger started cross-country skiing, but during his teens he decided to try out biathlon.

Berger joined the national biathlon team in 2001. During the 2004 Biathlon World Championships in Oberhof, Germany, he won silver medals in the 15 km mass start and the 4 × 7.5 km relay. Berger also won two gold medals in the military world championships that same year (cross-country and patrol). Berger finished fifth in the 2004 overall World Cup, and won several gold medals from the Norwegian Biathlon Championships. At the 2007 Biathlon World Championships in Rasen-Antholz, Italy, Berger was part of the Norwegian team that won silver in the 4 × 7.5 km relay. After several disappointing races, mainly due to unstable shooting, Berger was thrown off the Norwegian national team ahead of the 2008/2009 season. He revenged this by retrieving two world cup victories in sprint events, a silver in the World Championship sprint, and contributed to the gold in the men's relay. He was regarded as perhaps the fastest skier on the biathlon tour, but his lack of shooting accuracy often prevented him from producing consistent and winning results.

Berger also competed in cross-country skiing from 2002. He won the 30 km and relay at the 2003 Norwegian cross-country skiing championships in Molde Municipality. Berger won a gold in the 4 × 10 km at the 2005 FIS Nordic World Ski Championships in Oberstdorf and finished 4th in the 15 km in those same championships. Berger won the gold medal in the 15 km at the Nordic Skiing World Championships in Sapporo in 2007.

Berger is the first person to win medals at the World Championships in biathlon and Nordic skiing in the same year. He is also the only athlete to win gold in relays in both World Championships (in Nordic skiing in 2005 and 2007, in biathlon in 2009).

In 2014, Berger won gold medal in the men's 15 km cross county skiing in the military world championship in Sodankylä, Finland.

On 27 April 2015, Berger announced his retirement from the sport. He cited a "chronic knee injury" as his reason for retiring.

Though Berger only participated in the 2010 Olympics, in both cross-country skiing and biathlon, he did travel to the Olympic Games as a reserve athlete in biathlon in both 2002 and 2014.

== Biathlon results ==
All results are sourced from the International Biathlon Union.

=== Olympic Games ===
Event	Individual	Sprint	Pursuit	Mass start	Relay
(Canada) 2010 Vancouver	—	46th	23rd	—	—

=== World Championships ===
5 medals (1 gold, 4 silver)

Event	Individual	Sprint	Pursuit	Mass start	Relay	Mixed relay
(Germany) 2004 Oberhof	24th	14th	11th	Silver	Silver	—N/a
(Austria) 2005 Hochfilzen	—	44th	32nd	—	—	—
(Slovenia) 2006 Pokljuka	—N/a	—N/a	—N/a	—N/a	—N/a	23rd
(Italy) 2007 Antholz-Anterselva	49th	14th	11th	17th	Silver	—
(South Korea) 2009 Pyeongchang	34th	Silver	5th	29th	Gold	4th
(Russia) 2011 Khanty-Mansiysk	65th	14th	19th	14th	—	—
(Germany) 2012 Ruhpolding	—	32nd	40th	—	—	—

*During Olympic seasons competitions are only held for those events not included in the Olympic program.
**The mixed relay was added as an event in 2005.

=== Overall record ===
Result	Individual	Sprint	Pursuit	Mass start	Relay	Mixed relay	Total
1st place	–	7	–	–	4	–	11
2nd place	–	2	2	1	5	–	10
3rd place	–	3	1	–	2	–	6
4–10	2	14	9	1	3	1	30
11–20	–	14	16	9	1	1	41
21–40	7	24	25	12	–	1	69
41–60	10	21	7	–	–	–	38
Others	4	4	–	–	–	–	8
DNF	–	–	–	–	–	–	0
DSQ	–	–	–	–	1	–	1
Starts	23	89	60	23	16	3	214

*Results in all UIPMB and IBU World Cup races.

=== Junior/Youth World Championships ===
Event	Individual	Sprint	Pursuit	Relay
(Slovenia) 1999 Pokljuka	11th	9th	5th	—

=== Individual victories ===
7 victories (7 Sp)

Season	Date	Location	Discipline	Level
2003–04; 3 victories (3 Sp)	11 December 2003	(Austria) Hochfilzen	10 km sprint	Biathlon World Cup
2003–04; 3 victories (3 Sp)	27 February 2004	(United States) Lake Placid	10 km sprint	Biathlon World Cup
2003–04; 3 victories (3 Sp)	11 March 2004	(Norway) Oslo Holmenkollen	10 km sprint	Biathlon World Cup
2008–09; 2 victories (2 Sp)	20 December 2008	(Austria) Hochfilzen	10 km sprint	Biathlon World Cup
2008–09; 2 victories (2 Sp)	13 March 2009	(Canada) Vancouver	10 km sprint	Biathlon World Cup
2010–11; 1 victory (1 Sp)	14 January 2011	(Germany) Ruhpolding	10 km sprint	Biathlon World Cup
2013–14; 1 victory (1 Sp)	6 December 2013	(Austria) Hochfilzen	10 km sprint	Biathlon World Cup

*Results are from UIPMB and IBU races which include the Biathlon World Cup, Biathlon World Championships and the Winter Olympic Games.

== Cross-country skiing results ==
All results are sourced from the International Ski Federation (FIS).

=== Olympic Games ===
- 1 medal – (1 silver)

Year	Age	15 km individual	30 km skiathlon	50 km mass start	Sprint	4 × 10 km relay	Team sprint
2010	30	—	—	—	—	Silver	—

=== World Championships ===
- 3 medals – (3 gold)

Year	Age	15 km individual	30 km skiathlon	50 km mass start	Sprint	4 × 10 km relay	Team sprint
2005	25	4	—	—	—	Gold	—
2007	27	Gold	—	—	—	Gold	—

=== World Cup ===
==== Season standings ====
Season	Age	Discipline standings			Ski Tour standings		
Season	Age	Overall	Distance	Sprint	Nordic Opening	Tour de Ski	World Cup Final
2004	24	81	54	—	—N/a	—N/a	—N/a
2005	25	93	59	—	—N/a	—N/a	—N/a
2006	26	NC	NC	—	—N/a	—N/a	—N/a
2007	27	78	46	—	—N/a	—	—N/a
2008	28	144	85	—	—N/a	—	—
2010	30	130	84	—	—N/a	—	—
2012	32	107	67	—	—	—	—

==== Team podiums ====
- 1 victory – (1 RL)
- 2 podiums – (2 RL)

No.	Season	Date	Location	Race	Level	Place	Teammates
1	2003–04	23 November 2003	Beitostølen, Norway	4 × 10 km Relay C/F	World Cup	2nd	Svartedal / Hjelmeset / Hofstad
2	2011–12	20 November 2011	Sjusjøen, Norway	4 × 10 km Relay C/F	World Cup	1st	Rønning / Krogh / Northug

Awards
Preceded by Stein Johnson	Egebergs Ærespris; 2006	Succeeded by Frode Andresen
