= Biathlon World Championships 2012 =

Sports competition in Ruhpolding, Germany

- Host city: Ruhpolding
- Country: Germany
- Events: 11
- Opening: 1 March
- Closing: 11 March
- Website: www.ruhpolding2012.com

The 45th Biathlon World Championships were held in Ruhpolding, Germany, from 1 to 11 March 2012.

There were total of 11 competitions held: sprint, pursuit, individual, mass start and relay races for men and women, and a mixed relay. All events during the championships also counted for the 2011–12 Biathlon World Cup season.

== Schedule of events ==
The schedule of the event stands below. All times in CET.

Date	Time	Event
1 March	15:30	2 × 6 km + 2 × 7.5 km mixed relay
3 March	12:30	Men's 10 km sprint
3 March	15:30	Women's 7.5 km sprint
4 March	13:15	Men's 12.5 km pursuit
4 March	16:00	Women's 10 km pursuit
6 March	15:15	Men's 20 km individual
7 March	15:15	Women's 15 km individual
9 March	15:15	Men's 4 × 7.5 km relay
10 March	15:15	Women's 4 × 6 km relay
11 March	13:30	Men's 15 km mass start
11 March	16:00	Women's 12.5 km mass start

== Medal winners ==
=== Men ===
Event	Gold		Silver		Bronze	
10 km sprint	Martin Fourcade; France	24:18.6 (1+1)	Emil Hegle Svendsen; Norway	24:33.7 (1+1)	Carl Johan Bergman; Sweden	24:36.3 (0+0)
12.5 km pursuit	Martin Fourcade; France	33:39.4 (1+1+0+2)	Carl Johan Bergman; Sweden	33:44.6 (0+1+1+0)	Anton Shipulin; Russia	34:01.5 (1+0+0+0)
20 km individual	Jakov Fak; Slovenia	46:48.2 (0+0+0+1)	Simon Fourcade; France	46:55.2 (0+0+1+0)	Jaroslav Soukup; Czech Republic	47:00.5 (0+1+0+0)
4 × 7.5 km relay	Norway Ole Einar Bjørndalen; Rune Brattsveen; Tarjei Bø; Emil Hegle Svendsen	1:17:26.8 (0+0) (1+3) (0+0) (0+2) (0+1) (0+1) (0+0) (0+0)	France Jean-Guillaume Béatrix; Simon Fourcade; Alexis Bœuf; Martin Fourcade	1:17:56.5 (0+1) (0+1) (0+1) (0+1) (0+1) (0+0) (0+2) (0+3)	Germany Simon Schempp; Andreas Birnbacher; Michael Greis; Arnd Peiffer	1:18:19.8 (0+0) (0+1) (0+1) (0+3) (0+2) (0+0) (0+1) (0+2)
15 km mass start	Martin Fourcade; France	38:25.4 (0+1+1+0)	Björn Ferry; Sweden	38:28.4 (0+0+0+0)	Fredrik Lindström; Sweden	38:28.8 (0+1+1+0)

=== Women ===
Event	Gold		Silver		Bronze	
7.5 km sprint	Magdalena Neuner; Germany	21:07.0 (0+0)	Darya Domracheva; Belarus	21:22.2 (0+0)	Vita Semerenko; Ukraine	21:44.6 (0+0)
10 km pursuit	Darya Domracheva; Belarus	29:39.6 (0+1+1+0)	Magdalena Neuner; Germany	30:04.7 (0+1+0+2)	Olga Vilukhina; Russia	30:55.0 (0+0+1+0)
15 km individual	Tora Berger; Norway	42:30.0 (1+0+0+0)	Marie-Laure Brunet; France	43:26.4 (0+0+0+1)	Helena Ekholm; Sweden	43:41.1 (1+0+0+0)
4 × 6 km relay	Germany Tina Bachmann; Magdalena Neuner; Miriam Gössner; Andrea Henkel	1:09:33.0 (0+1) (0+0) (0+3) (1+3) (0+2) (0+1) (0+0) (0+0)	France Marie-Laure Brunet; Sophie Boilley; Anaïs Bescond; Marie Dorin Habert	1:10:01.5 (0+1) (0+0) (0+1) (0+0) (0+1) (0+2) (0+1) (0+1)	Norway Fanny Horn; Elise Ringen; Synnøve Solemdal; Tora Berger	1:10:12.5 (0+1) (0+3) (0+1) (0+2) (0+1) (0+3) (0+1) (0+0)
12.5 km mass start	Tora Berger; Norway	35:41.6 (0+0+1+0)	Marie-Laure Brunet; France	35:49.7 (0+0+0+1)	Kaisa Mäkäräinen; Finland	35:54.3 (0+0+0+1)

=== Mixed ===
Event	Gold		Silver		Bronze	
2 × 6 + 2 × 7.5 km W+M relay	Norway Tora Berger; Synnøve Solemdal; Ole Einar Bjørndalen; Emil Hegle Svendsen	1:12:29.3 (0+0) (0+0) (0+1) (0+3) (0+2) (0+2) (0+0) (0+2)	Slovenia Andreja Mali; Teja Gregorin; Klemen Bauer; Jakov Fak	1:12:49.5 (0+1) (0+0) (0+1) (0+0) (0+3) (0+2) (0+0) (0+0)	Germany Andrea Henkel; Magdalena Neuner; Andreas Birnbacher; Arnd Peiffer	1:13:02.1 (0+2) (0+1) (0+1) (0+2) (0+0) (0+0) (0+1) (1+3)

== Medal table ==
=== Top nations ===
Rank	Nation	Gold	Silver	Bronze	Total
1	Norway (NOR)	4	1	1	6
2	France (FRA)	3	5	0	8
3	Germany (GER)	2	1	2	5
4	Belarus (BLR)	1	1	0	2
4	Slovenia (SLO)	1	1	0	2
6	Sweden (SWE)	0	2	3	5
7	Russia (RUS)	0	0	2	2
8	Czech Republic (CZE)	0	0	1	1
8	Finland (FIN)	0	0	1	1
8	Ukraine (UKR)	0	0	1	1
Totals (10 entries)		11	11	11	33

=== Top athletes ===
All athletes with two or more medals.

Rank	Biathlete	Gold	Silver	Bronze	Total
1	Martin Fourcade (FRA)	3	1	0	4
2	Tora Berger (NOR)	3	0	1	4
3	Magdalena Neuner (GER)	2	1	1	4
4	Emil Hegle Svendsen (NOR)	2	1	0	3
5	Ole Einar Bjørndalen (NOR)	2	0	0	2
6	Darya Domracheva (BLR)	1	1	0	2
6	Jakov Fak (SLO)	1	1	0	2
8	Andrea Henkel (GER)	1	0	1	2
8	Synnøve Solemdal (NOR)	1	0	1	2
10	Marie-Laure Brunet (FRA)	0	3	0	3
11	Simon Fourcade (FRA)	0	2	0	2
12	Carl Johan Bergman (SWE)	0	1	1	2
13	Andreas Birnbacher (GER)	0	0	2	2
13	Arnd Peiffer (GER)	0	0	2	2
