= 2004–05 Biathlon World Cup =

Biathlon competition

2004–05 World Cup
Discipline	Men	Women
Overall	(Norway) Ole Einar Bjørndalen	(France) Sandrine Bailly
Nations Cup	Norway	Russia
Individual	(Germany) Michael Greis (Norway) Ole Einar Bjørndalen	(Russia) Olga Pyleva
Sprint	(Norway) Ole Einar Bjørndalen	(Germany) Kati Wilhelm
Pursuit	(Germany) Sven Fischer	(France) Sandrine Bailly
Mass start	(France) Raphaël Poirée (Norway) Ole Einar Bjørndalen	(Russia) Olga Zaitseva
Relay	Norway	Russia

Competition

The 2004–05 Biathlon World Cup was a multi-race tournament over a season of biathlon, organised by the International Biathlon Union. The Biathlon World Championships 2005 were part of the Biathlon World Cup.

The men's overall World Cup was won by Norway's Ole Einar Bjørndalen, while Sandrine Bailly of France claimed the women's overall World Cup.

== Calendar ==
Below is the World Cup calendar for the 2004–05 season.

Location	Date	Individual	Sprint	Pursuit	Mass start	Relay	Mixed relay
(Norway) Beitostolen	2–5 December		●	●		●	
(Norway) Oslo	9–12 December	●	●	●			
(Sweden) Östersund	15–19 December		●	●	●		
(Germany) Oberhof	6–9 January		●	●		●	
(Germany) Ruhpolding	12–16 January		●	●		●	
(Italy) Antholz	19–23 January	●	●	●			
(Italy) Cesana San Sicario	9–13 February	●	●			●	
(Slovenia) Pokljuka	16–20 February		●	●	●		
(Austria) Hochfilzen	4–13 March	●	●	●	●	●	
(Russia) Khanty-Mansiysk	16–19 March		●	●	●		
Total		4	10	9	4	5	0

== World Cup Podium ==
=== Men ===
Stage	Date	Place	Discipline	Winner	Second	Third	Yellow bib (After competition)	Det.
1	2 December 2004	(Norway) Beitostølen	10 km Sprint	(Norway) Ole Einar Bjørndalen	(Russia) Nikolay Kruglov	(France) Raphaël Poirée	(Norway) Ole Einar Bjørndalen	Detail
1	4 December 2004	(Norway) Beitostølen	12.5 km Pursuit	(Germany) Sven Fischer	(Russia) Nikolay Kruglov	(Russia) Sergei Rozhkov	(Russia) Nikolay Kruglov	Detail
2	9 December 2004	(Norway) Oslo Holmenkollen	20 km Individual	(Germany) Sven Fischer	(Norway) Ole Einar Bjørndalen	(Poland) Tomasz Sikora	(Germany) Sven Fischer	Detail
2	11 December 2004	(Norway) Oslo Holmenkollen	10 km Sprint	(Norway) Ole Einar Bjørndalen	(France) Raphaël Poirée	(Norway) Halvard Hanevold	(Norway) Ole Einar Bjørndalen	Detail
2	12 December 2004	(Norway) Oslo Holmenkollen	12.5 km Pursuit	(Germany) Sven Fischer	(France) Raphaël Poirée	(Norway) Ole Einar Bjørndalen	(Norway) Ole Einar Bjørndalen	Detail
3	15 December 2004	(Sweden) Östersund	10 km Sprint	(Norway) Stian Eckhoff	(Norway) Frode Andresen	(Russia) Sergei Rozhkov	(France) Raphaël Poirée	Detail
3	17 December 2004	(Sweden) Östersund	12.5 km Pursuit	(Norway) Egil Gjelland	(Russia) Sergei Rozhkov	(France) Raphaël Poirée	(France) Raphaël Poirée	Detail
3	19 December 2004	(Sweden) Östersund	15 km Mass Start	(France) Raphaël Poirée	(Russia) Sergei Rozhkov	(Russia) Ivan Tcherezov	(France) Raphaël Poirée	Detail
4	7 January 2005	(Germany) Oberhof	10 km Sprint	(Germany) Sven Fischer	(Norway) Frode Andresen	(Norway) Egil Gjelland	(France) Raphaël Poirée	Detail
4	9 January 2005	(Germany) Oberhof	12.5 km Pursuit	(France) Raphaël Poirée	(Germany) Sven Fischer	(Germany) Alexander Wolf	(France) Raphaël Poirée	Detail
5	15 January 2005	(Germany) Ruhpolding	10 km Sprint	(Norway) Ole Einar Bjørndalen	(France) Raphaël Poirée	(Italy) René-Laurent Vuillermoz	(France) Raphaël Poirée	Detail
5	16 January 2005	(Germany) Ruhpolding	12.5 km Pursuit	(Norway) Ole Einar Bjørndalen	(Norway) Lars Berger	(Germany) Ricco Groß	(France) Raphaël Poirée	Detail
6	19 January 2005	(Italy) Antholz-Anterselva	20 km Individual	(Norway) Ole Einar Bjørndalen	(China) Zhang Chengye	(Russia) Nikolay Kruglov	(France) Raphaël Poirée	Detail
6	21 January 2005	(Italy) Antholz-Anterselva	10 km Sprint	(Norway) Ole Einar Bjørndalen	(Norway) Frode Andresen	(Germany) Sven Fischer	(France) Raphaël Poirée	Detail
6	23 January 2005	(Italy) Antholz-Anterselva	12.5 km Pursuit	(Norway) Ole Einar Bjørndalen	(Russia) Sergei Tchepikov	(Norway) Halvard Hanevold	(Norway) Ole Einar Bjørndalen	Detail
7	9 February 2005	(Italy) Turin	20 km Individual	(Germany) Michael Greis	(Russia) Sergei Tchepikov	(Russia) Sergei Rozhkov	(France) Raphaël Poirée	Detail
7	11 February 2005	(Italy) Turin	10 km Sprint	(Russia) Sergei Rozhkov	(Sweden) Björn Ferry	(Belarus) Alexander Syman	(France) Raphaël Poirée	Detail
8	16 February 2005	(Slovenia) Pokljuka	10 km Sprint	(Belarus) Alexander Syman	(Russia) Sergei Rozhkov	(Germany) Andreas Birnbacher	(France) Raphaël Poirée	Detail
8	18 February 2005	(Slovenia) Pokljuka	12.5 km Pursuit	(Russia) Nikolay Kruglov	(Russia) Sergei Rozhkov	(Germany) Andreas Birnbacher	(France) Raphaël Poirée	Detail
8	20 February 2005	(Slovenia) Pokljuka	15 km Mass Start	(Norway) Ole Einar Bjørndalen	(France) Raphaël Poirée	(Norway) Stian Eckhoff	(France) Raphaël Poirée	Detail
WC	5 March 2005	(Austria) Hochfilzen	10 km Sprint	(Norway) Ole Einar Bjørndalen	(Germany) Sven Fischer	(Latvia) Ilmārs Bricis	(Germany) Sven Fischer	Detail
WC	6 March 2005	(Austria) Hochfilzen	12.5 km Pursuit	(Norway) Ole Einar Bjørndalen	(Russia) Sergei Tchepikov	(Germany) Sven Fischer	(Germany) Sven Fischer	Detail
WC	9 March 2005	(Austria) Hochfilzen	20 km Individual	(Czech Republic) Roman Dostál	(Germany) Michael Greis	(Germany) Ricco Groß	(Germany) Sven Fischer	Detail
WC	13 March 2005	(Austria) Hochfilzen	15 km Mass Start	(Norway) Ole Einar Bjørndalen	(Germany) Sven Fischer	(France) Raphaël Poirée	(Germany) Sven Fischer	Detail
9	16 March 2005	(Russia) Khanty-Mansiysk	10 km Sprint	(Germany) Sven Fischer	(Belarus) Oleg Ryzhenkov	(Norway) Halvard Hanevold	(Germany) Sven Fischer	Detail
9	17 March 2005	(Russia) Khanty-Mansiysk	12.5 km Pursuit	(Norway) Ole Einar Bjørndalen	(Ukraine) Andriy Deryzemlya	(Poland) Tomasz Sikora	(Germany) Sven Fischer	Detail
9	19 March 2005	(Russia) Khanty-Mansiysk	15 km Mass Start	(France) Raphaël Poirée	(Norway) Ole Einar Bjørndalen	(Russia) Sergei Rozhkov	(Norway) Ole Einar Bjørndalen	Detail

=== Women ===
Stage	Date	Place	Discipline	Winner	Second	Third	Yellow bib (After competition)	Det.
1	2 December 2004	(Norway) Beitostølen	7.5 km Sprint	(Germany) Uschi Disl	(Germany) Andrea Henkel	(Russia) Albina Akhatova	(Germany) Uschi Disl	Detail
1	4 December 2004	(Norway) Beitostølen	10 km Pursuit	(Germany) Uschi Disl	(Russia) Olga Pyleva	(Germany) Martina Glagow	(Germany) Uschi Disl	Detail
2	9 December 2004	(Norway) Oslo Holmenkollen	15 km Individual	(Germany) Martina Glagow	(Russia) Svetlana Ishmouratova	(Poland) Magdalena Gwizdoń	(Germany) Uschi Disl	Detail
2	11 December 2004	(Norway) Oslo Holmenkollen	7.5 km Sprint	(Russia) Olga Zaitseva	(Russia) Olga Pyleva	(Slovenia) Tadeja Brankovič	(Germany) Uschi Disl	Detail
2	12 December 2004	(Norway) Oslo Holmenkollen	10 km Pursuit	(France) Sandrine Bailly	(Russia) Olga Zaitseva	(Belarus) Olena Zubrilova	(Germany) Uschi Disl	Detail
3	16 December 2004	(Sweden) Östersund	7.5 km Sprint	(France) Sandrine Bailly	(Russia) Olga Zaitseva	(Slovenia) Tadeja Brankovič	(Germany) Uschi Disl	Detail
3	18 December 2004	(Sweden) Östersund	10 km Pursuit	(Russia) Olga Zaitseva	(France) Sandrine Bailly	(Russia) Olga Pyleva	(Russia) Olga Pyleva	Detail
3	19 December 2004	(Sweden) Östersund	12.5 km Mass Start	(Norway) Liv Grete Poirée	(Russia) Olga Zaitseva	(Norway) Linda Tjørhom	(Russia) Olga Pyleva	Detail
4	8 January 2005	(Germany) Oberhof	7.5 km Sprint	(Norway) Linda Tjørhom	(Germany) Uschi Disl	(Germany) Kati Wilhelm	(Russia) Olga Zaitseva	Detail
4	9 January 2005	(Germany) Oberhof	10 km Pursuit	(Germany) Uschi Disl	(Germany) Kati Wilhelm	(Norway) Linda Tjørhom	(Germany) Uschi Disl	Detail
5	14 January 2005	(Germany) Ruhpolding	7.5 km Sprint	(Russia) Olga Pyleva	(Russia) Svetlana Tchernousova	(Germany) Martina Glagow	(Russia) Olga Pyleva	Detail
5	16 January 2005	(Germany) Ruhpolding	10 km Pursuit	(Russia) Olga Pyleva	(China) Liu Xianying	(Norway) Linda Tjørhom	(Russia) Olga Pyleva	Detail
6	20 January 2005	(Italy) Antholz-Anterselva	15 km Individual	(Belarus) Olena Zubrilova	(Sweden) Anna Carin Olofsson	(Russia) Olga Pyleva	(Russia) Olga Pyleva	Detail
6	22 January 2005	(Italy) Antholz-Anterselva	7.5 km Sprint	(Germany) Kati Wilhelm	(Norway) Tora Berger	(Norway) Linda Tjørhom	(Russia) Olga Pyleva	Detail
6	23 January 2005	(Italy) Antholz-Anterselva	10 km Pursuit	(France) Sandrine Bailly	(Norway) Tora Berger	(Germany) Simone Denkinger	(Russia) Olga Pyleva	Detail
7	10 February 2005	(Italy) Turin	15 km Individual	(Russia) Anna Bogaliy	(Russia) Olga Pyleva	(Germany) Kati Wilhelm	(Russia) Olga Pyleva	Detail
7	12 February 2005	(Italy) Turin	7.5 km Sprint	(Germany) Kati Wilhelm	(Poland) Magdalena Gwizdoń	(China) Liu Xianying	(Russia) Olga Pyleva	Detail
8	17 February 2005	(Slovenia) Pokljuka	7.5 km Sprint	(France) Sandrine Bailly	(China) Kong Yingchao	(Norway) Gro Marit Istad-Kristiansen	(Germany) Kati Wilhelm	Detail
8	19 February 2005	(Slovenia) Pokljuka	10 km Pursuit	(France) Sandrine Bailly	(China) Kong Yingchao	(Russia) Olga Zaitseva	(Germany) Kati Wilhelm	Detail
8	20 February 2005	(Slovenia) Pokljuka	12.5 km Mass Start	(France) Sandrine Bailly	(Russia) Olga Pyleva	(Germany) Kati Wilhelm	(Germany) Kati Wilhelm	Detail
WC	5 March 2005	(Austria) Hochfilzen	7.5 km Sprint	(Germany) Uschi Disl	(Russia) Olga Zaitseva	(Belarus) Olena Zubrilova	(Russia) Olga Pyleva	Detail
WC	6 March 2005	(Austria) Hochfilzen	10 km Pursuit	(Germany) Uschi Disl	(China) Liu Xianying	(Russia) Olga Zaitseva	(Russia) Olga Pyleva	Detail
WC	8 March 2005	(Austria) Hochfilzen	15 km Individual	(Germany) Andrea Henkel	(China) Sun Ribo	(Norway) Linda Tjørhom	(Russia) Olga Pyleva	Detail
WC	13 March 2005	(Austria) Hochfilzen	12.5 km Mass Start	(Norway) Gro Marit Istad-Kristiansen	(Sweden) Anna Carin Olofsson	(Russia) Olga Pyleva	(Russia) Olga Pyleva	Detail
9	16 March 2005	(Russia) Khanty-Mansiysk	7.5 km Sprint	(Germany) Katrin Apel	(Russia) Svetlana Ishmouratova	(Germany) Simone Denkinger	(Russia) Olga Pyleva	Detail
9	17 March 2005	(Russia) Khanty-Mansiysk	10 km Pursuit	(Germany) Kati Wilhelm	(France) Sandrine Bailly	(Russia) Olga Zaitseva	(France) Sandrine Bailly	Detail
9	19 March 2005	(Russia) Khanty-Mansiysk	12.5 km Mass Start	(Russia) Olga Zaitseva	(Germany) Kati Wilhelm	(Russia) Anna Bogaliy	(France) Sandrine Bailly	Detail

=== Men's team ===
Event	Date	Place	Discipline	Winner	Second	Third
1	6 December 2004	(Norway) Beitostolen	4x7.5 km Relay	Norway Halvard Hanevold; Stian Eckhoff; Egil Gjelland; Ole Einar Bjørndalen	Germany Peter Sendel; Ricco Gross; Andreas Birnbacher; Sven Fischer	Russia Filipp Shulman; Nikolay Kruglov; Sergei Tchepikov; Sergei Rozhkov
4	6 January 2005	(Germany) Oberhof	4x7.5 km Relay	Sweden David Ekholm; Björn Ferry; Mattias Nilsson; Carl Johan Bergman	Germany Daniel Graf; Ricco Gross; Sven Fischer; Michael Greis	Russia Sergei Rozhkov; Pavel Rostovtsev; Nikolay Kruglov; Ivan Tcherezov
5	13 January 2005	(Germany) Ruhpolding	4x7.5 km Relay	Norway Egil Gjelland; Stian Eckhoff; Halvard Hanevold; Ole Einar Bjørndalen	Germany Alexander Wolf; Ricco Gross; Sven Fischer; Michael Greis	Austria Christoph Sumann; Wolfgang Perner; Wolfgang Rottmann; Ludwig Gredler
7	13 February 2005	(Italy) Cesana San Sicario	4x7.5 km Relay	Norway Frode Andresen; Egil Gjelland; Stian Eckhoff; Halvard Hanevold	Russia Ivan Tcherezov; Nikolay Kruglov; Sergei Tchepikov; Sergei Rozhkov	Germany Daniel Graf; Sven Fischer; Andreas Birnbacher; Alexander Wolf
WC	12 March 2005	(Austria) Hochfilzen	4x7.5 km Relay	Norway Halvard Hanevold; Stian Eckhoff; Egil Gjelland; Ole Einar Bjørndalen	Russia Sergei Rozhkov; Nikolay Kruglov; Pavel Rostovtsev; Sergei Tchepikov	Austria Daniel Mesotitsch; Friedrich Pinter; Wolfgang Rottmann; Christoph Sumann

=== Women's team ===
Event	Date	Place	Discipline	Winner	Second	Third
1	5 December 2004	(Norway) Beitostolen	4x6 km Relay	Russia Albina Akhatova; Olga Pyleva; Anna Bogaliy; Olga Zaitseva	Germany Uschi Disl; Katja Beer; Kati Wilhelm; Martina Glagow	France Delphyne Peretto; Christelle Gros; Florence Baverel-Robert; Sandrine Bailly
4	6 January 2005	(Germany) Oberhof	4x6 km Relay	Germany Uschi Disl; Katrin Apel; Andrea Henkel; Kati Wilhelm	Russia Olga Pyleva; Julija Makarova; Svetlana Ishmouratova; Olga Zaitseva	Slovenia Andreja Koblar; Teja Gregorin; Dijana Grudiček; Tadeja Brankovič
5	13 January 2005	(Germany) Ruhpolding	4x6 km Relay	Russia Olga Pyleva; Anna Bogaliy; Svetlana Ishmouratova; Olga Zaitseva	Germany Uschi Disl; Katrin Apel; Martina Glagow; Kati Wilhelm	Norway Linda Tjorhom; Tora Berger; Gro Marit Istad-Kristiansen; Liv Grete Poiree
7	13 February 2005	(Italy) Cesana San Sicario	4x6 km Relay	Russia Olga Pyleva; Svetlana Ishmouratova; Anna Bogaliy; Olga Zaitseva	France Delphyne Peretto; Christelle Gros; Anne-Laure Mignerey; Sandrine Bailly	Belarus Ekaterina Ivanova; Olga Nazarova; Lyudmila Ananko; Olena Zubrilova
WC	12 March 2005	(Austria) Hochfilzen	4x6 km Relay	Russia Olga Pyleva; Svetlana Ishmouratova; Anna Bogaliy; Olga Zaitseva	Germany Uschi Disl; Katrin Apel; Andrea Henkel; Kati Wilhelm	Belarus Ekaterina Ivanova; Olga Nazarova; Lyudmila Ananko; Olena Zubrilova

== Standings: Men ==
=== Overall ===
Pos.		Points
1.	(Norway) Ole Einar Bjørndalen	923
2.	(Germany) Sven Fischer	912
3.	(France) Raphaël Poirée	869
4.	(Russia) Sergei Tchepikov	672
5.	(Russia) Sergei Rozhkov	656

- Final standings after 27 races.

=== Individual ===
Pos.		Points
1.	(Norway) Ole Einar Bjørndalen	130
1.	(Germany) Michael Greis	130
3.	(Germany) Sven Fischer	127
4.	(Russia) Sergei Tchepikov	114
5.	(Poland) Tomasz Sikora	104

- Final standings after 4 races.

=== Sprint ===
Pos.		Points
1.	(Norway) Ole Einar Bjørndalen	330
2.	(Germany) Sven Fischer	323
3.	(France) Raphaël Poirée	277
4.	(Russia) Sergei Tchepikov	247
5.	(Russia) Sergei Rozhkov	236

- Final standings after 10 races.

=== Pursuit ===
Pos.		Points
1.	(Germany) Sven Fischer	326
2.	(Norway) Ole Einar Bjørndalen	317
3.	(France) Raphaël Poirée	274
4.	(Russia) Sergei Rozhkov	272
5.	(Germany) Ricco Groß	250

- Final standings after 9 races.

=== Mass Start ===
Pos.		Points
1.	(France) Raphaël Poirée	146
1.	(Norway) Ole Einar Bjørndalen	146
3.	(Germany) Sven Fischer	123
4.	(Poland) Tomasz Sikora	108
5.	(Norway) Stian Eckhoff	103

- Final standings after 4 races.

=== Relay ===
Pos.		Points
1.	Norway	200
2.	Germany	181
3.	Russia	178
4.	Austria	155
5.	France	151

- Final standings after 5 races.

=== Nation ===
Pos.		Points
1.	Norway	4889
2.	Germany	4746
3.	Russia	4632
4.	France	4435
5.	Austria	4003

- Final standings after 19 races.

== Standings: Women ==
=== Overall ===
Pos.		Points
1.	(France) Sandrine Bailly	847
2.	(Germany) Kati Wilhelm	833
3.	(Russia) Olga Pyleva	830
4.	(Russia) Olga Zaitseva	752
5.	(Germany) Uschi Disl	659

- Final standings after 27 races.

=== Individual ===
Pos.		Points
1.	(Russia) Olga Pyleva	123
2.	(Germany) Martina Glagow	115
3.	(Russia) Svetlana Ishmouratova	104
4.	(France) Sandrine Bailly	90
5.	(Sweden) Anna Carin Olofsson	89

- Final standings after 4 races.

=== Sprint ===
Pos.		Points
1.	(Germany) Kati Wilhelm	305
2.	(France) Sandrine Bailly	294
3.	(Russia) Olga Zaitseva	292
4.	(Germany) Uschi Disl	282
5.	(Russia) Olga Pyleva	266

- Final standings after 10 races.

=== Pursuit ===
Pos.		Points
1.	(France) Sandrine Bailly	322
2.	(Russia) Olga Pyleva	298
3.	(Russia) Olga Zaitseva	290
4.	(Germany) Kati Wilhelm	281
5.	(Germany) Uschi Disl	247

- Final standings after 9 races.

=== Mass Start ===
Pos.		Points
1.	(Russia) Olga Zaitseva	136
2.	(Russia) Olga Pyleva	129
3.	(Germany) Kati Wilhelm	126
4.	(France) Sandrine Bailly	110
5.	(China) Liu Xianying	94

- Final standings after 4 races.

=== Relay ===
Pos.		Points
1.	Russia	200
2.	Germany	188
3.	Norway	163
4.	France	159
5.	Belarus	150

- Final standings after 5 races.

=== Nation ===
Pos.		Points
1.	Russia	4910
2.	Germany	4815
3.	Norway	4367
4.	France	4206
5.	China	4012

- Final standings after 19 races.

== Medal table ==
Rank	Nation	Gold	Silver	Bronze	Total
1	Norway	21	8	13	42
2	Germany	18	14	15	47
3	Russia	13	22	16	51
4	France	9	7	4	20
5	Belarus	2	1	5	8
6	Sweden	1	3	0	4
7	Czech Republic	1	0	0	1
8	China	0	6	1	7
9	Poland	0	1	3	4
10	Ukraine	0	1	0	1
11	Slovenia	0	0	3	3
12	Austria	0	0	2	2
13	Italy	0	0	1	1
13	Latvia	0	0	1	1
Totals (14 entries)		65	63	64	192

== Achievements ==
Victory in this World Cup (all-time number of victories in parentheses)

Men

- Ole Einar Bjørndalen (NOR), 12 (55) first places
- Sven Fischer (GER), 5 (30) first places
- Raphaël Poirée (FRA), 3 (37) first places
- Sergei Rozhkov (RUS), 1 (4) first place
- Stian Eckhoff (NOR), 1 (1) first place
- Egil Gjelland (NOR), 1 (1) first place
- Michael Greis (GER), 1 (1) first place
- Alexandr Syman (BLR), 1 (1) first place
- Nikolay Kruglov (RUS), 1 (1) first place
- Roman Dostál (CZE), 1 (1) first place

Women

- Sandrine Bailly (FRA), 6 (13) first places
- Uschi Disl (GER), 5 (29) first places
- Kati Wilhelm (GER), 3 (9) first places
- Olga Zaitseva (RUS), 3 (5) first places
- Olga Pyleva (RUS), 2 (10) first places
- Liv Grete Poirée (NOR), 1 (21) first place
- Olena Zubrilova (BLR), 1 (20) first place
- Martina Glagow (GER), 1 (6) first place
- Andrea Henkel (GER), 1 (4) first place
- Katrin Apel (GER), 1 (4) first place
- Linda Tjørhom (NOR), 1 (3) first place
- Anna Bogaliy-Titovets (RUS), 1 (3) first place
- Gro Marit Istad Kristiansen (NOR), 1 (3) first place
- Svetlana Tchernousova (RUS), 1 (1) first place

== Retirements ==
Following notable biathletes retired during or after the 2004–05 season:

- Petr Garabík (CZE)
- Vesa Hietalahti (FIN)
- Carsten Heymann (GER)
- Devis Da Canal (ITA)
- Alexei Kobelev (RUS)
- Sergei Konovalov (RUS)
- Sanna-Leena Perunka (FIN)
- Corinne Niogret (FRA)
- Anna Sprung (AUT)
