= Biathlon World Championships 2007 – Men's mass start =

Below are the results of the 2007 Biathlon World Championships 2007 for the men's mass start, which took place on 11 February 2007.

== Results ==
Rank	Athlete	Nation	P1	P2	S1	S2	T	Result
1	Michael Greis	(Germany) GER	0	0	2	0	2	37:52.1
2	Andreas Birnbacher	(Germany) GER	0	0	0	0	0	+15.4
3	Raphaël Poirée	(France) FRA	1	0	0	0	1	+28.1
4	Ole Einar Bjørndalen	(Norway) NOR	0	0	2	2	4	+36.3
5	Sven Fischer	(Germany) GER	0	0	1	1	2	+40.3
6	Frode Andresen	(Norway) NOR	1	0	1	1	3	+41.8
7	Christoph Sumann	(Austria) AUT	1	0	0	1	2	+47.5
8	Simon Fourcade	(France) FRA	0	0	1	0	1	+49.7
9	Jay Hakkinen	(United States) USA	1	0	0	1	2	+52.9
10	Mattias Jr. Nilsson	(Sweden) SWE	0	0	2	0	2	+52.9
11	Vincent Defrasne	(France) FRA	1	1	0	0	2	+58.9
12	Nikolay Kruglov, Jr.	(Russia) RUS	0	1	0	0	1	+1:00.5
13	Sergei Rozhkov	(Russia) RUS	1	0	0	0	1	+1:03.9
14	Alexander Wolf	(Germany) GER	2	0	1	0	3	+1:14.1
15	Björn Ferry	(Sweden) SWE	0	0	1	2	3	+1:27.6
16	Ivan Tcherezov	(Russia) RUS	0	1	0	1	2	+1:42.7
17	Lars Berger	(Norway) NOR	0	1	1	2	4	+1:57.0
18	Halvard Hanevold	(Norway) NOR	1	0	1	1	3	+2:08.8
19	Olexander Bilanenko	(Ukraine) UKR	0	1	0	1	2	+2:08.9
20	Michal Šlesingr	(Czech Republic) CZE	0	1	1	2	4	+2:09.7
21	Tomasz Sikora	(Poland) POL	1	2	2	1	6	+2:25.2
22	Maxim Tchoudov	(Russia) RUS	0	1	1	3	5	+2:35.4
23	Michael Roesch	(Germany) GER	1	2	2	1	6	+2:36.6
24	Tim Burke	(United States) USA	1	2	2	1	6	+2:36.6
25	Andriy Deryzemlya	(Ukraine) UKR	1	0	2	1	4	+2:44.0
26	Alexei Korobeynikov	(Ukraine) UKR	0	2	2	0	4	+3:19.3
27	Matthias Simmen	(Switzerland) SUI	2	2	1	3	8	+3:41.0
28	Christian De Lorenzi	(Italy) ITA	2	1	1	2	6	+3:41.2
29	Daniel Mesotitsch	(Austria) AUT	1	2	2	1	6	+3:42.1
30	Rene Laurent Vuillermoz	(Italy) ITA	2	0	1	1	4	+4:33.2
