= List of Winter Olympics venues: C–G =

For the Winter Olympics, there are a total of 11 venues starting with the letter 'C,' two venues starting with the letter 'D,' three venues starting with the letter 'E,' two venues starting with the letter 'F,' and three letters starting with the letter 'F.'

== C ==
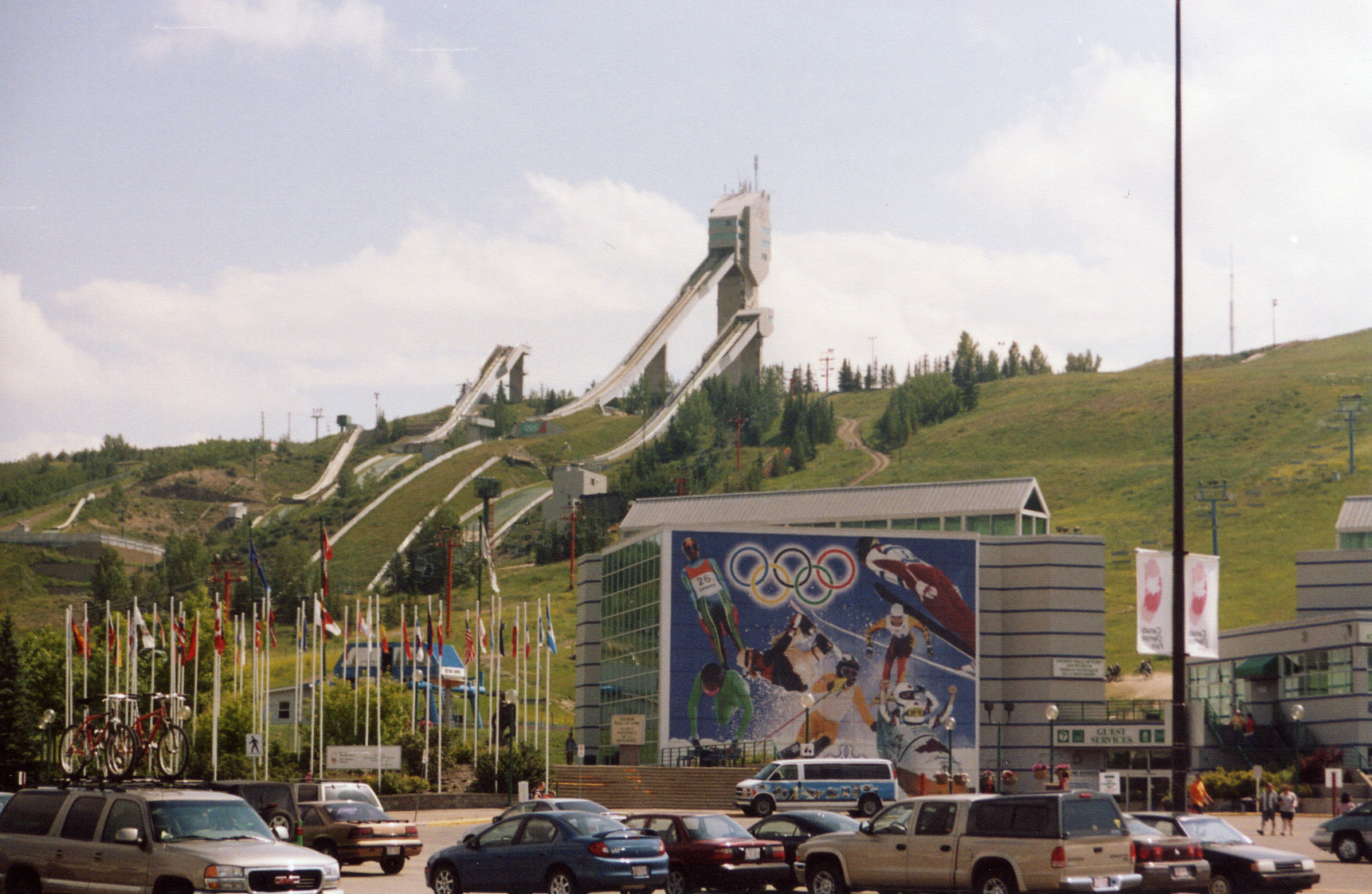
For the 1988 Winter Olympics in Calgary, Canada Olympic Park hosted the bobsleigh, freestyle skiing (demonstration), luge, ski jumping, and the ski jumping part of Nordic combined.

Venue	Games	Sports	Capacity	Ref.
Rogers Arena (was known as General Motors Place at the time of the games, but due to the no-commercialization policy, it was renamed Canada Hockey Place during the games)	2010 Vancouver	Ice hockey (final)	18,630	
Canada Olympic Park (includes bobsleigh/luge track)	1988 Calgary	Bobsleigh, Freestyle skiing (demonstration), Luge, Nordic combined (ski jumping), Ski jumping	25,000 (bobsleigh/luge); 35,000 (ski jumping); 15,000 (freestyle)	
Canmore Nordic Centre	1988 Calgary	Biathlon, Cross-country skiing, Nordic combined (cross-country skiing)	Not listed.	
Capital Indoor Stadium	2022 Beijing	Figure Skating; Short Track Speed Skating	17,345	
Central Stadium	2014 Sochi	Ceremonies (opening/ closing)	45,000	
Cesana Pariol	2006 Turin	Bobsleigh, Luge, Skeleton	4,400	
Cesana San Sicario	2006 Turin	Biathlon	4,700	
Chamrousse	1968 Grenoble	Alpine skiing (men)	Not listed.	
Cresta Run	1928 St. Moritz	Skeleton	Not listed.	
Cresta Run	1948 St. Moritz	Skeleton	Not listed.	
Cypress Mountain	2010 Vancouver	Freestyle skiing, snowboarding	8,000	

== D ==
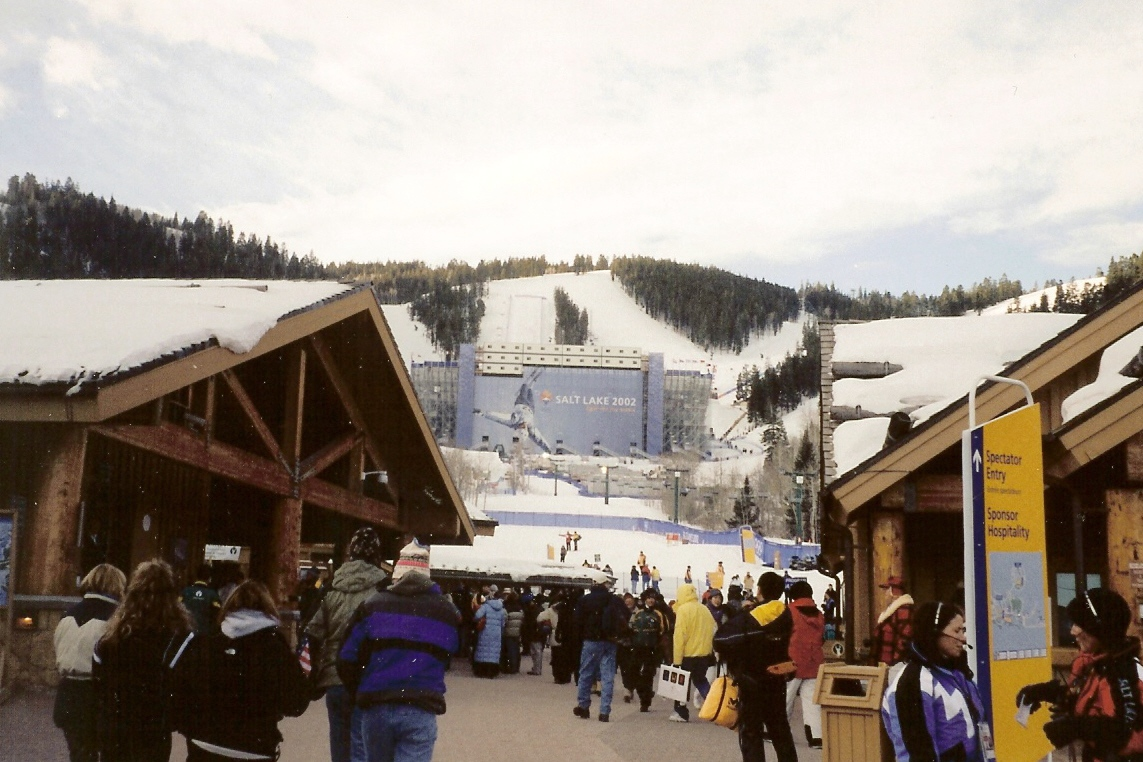
The aerials venue at the resort during the 2002 Winter Olympics in Salt Lake City. Deer Valley hosted all of the freestyle skiing and the slalom part of the alpine skiing events.

Venue	Games	Sports	Capacity	Ref.
Dæhlenenga	1952 Oslo	Bandy (demonstration), Ice hockey	Not listed	
Deer Valley	2002 Salt Lake City	Alpine skiing (slalom), Freestyle skiing	13,400	

== E ==
Venue	Games	Sports	Capacity	Ref.
E Center	2002 Salt Lake City	Ice hockey (final)	10,500	
Eisschnellaufbahn	1964 Innsbruck	Speed skating	Not listed.	
Eisschnellaufbahn	1976 Innsbruck	Speed skating	7,000	

== F ==
Venue	Games	Sports	Capacity	Ref.
Father David Bauer Olympic Arena	1988 Calgary	Ice hockey	2,000	
Freestyle Skiing Center and Snowboard Park	2014 Sochi	Freestyle skiing, Snowboarding	8,000 (freestyle skiing); 8,000 (snowboarding)	

== G ==
Venue	Games	Sports	Capacity	Ref.
Gjøvik Olympic Cavern Hall	1994 Lillehammer	Ice hockey	5,300	
Große Olympiaschanze	1936 Garmisch-Partenkirchen	Cross-country skiing, Nordic combined, Ski jumping	40,000	
Gudiberg	1936 Garmisch-Partenkirchen	Alpine skiing (combined - slalom)	24,000	
