= Sergei Rozhkov (biathlete) =

Russian biathlete

Personal information
- Full name: Sergei Leonidovich Rozhkov
- Born: 1 April 1972 (age 54) Murmansk, RSFSR, Soviet Union
- Height: 1.75 m (5 ft 9 in)

Sport

Professional information
- Sport: Biathlon
- World Cup debut: 7 December 1995

Olympic Games
- Teams: 2 (2002, 2006)
- Medals: 0

World Championships
- Teams: 11 (1996, 1997, 1998, 1999, 2000, 2001, 2002, 2003, 2004, 2005, 2007)
- Medals: 7 (1 gold)

World Cup
- Seasons: 13 (1995/96–2007/08)
- Individual victories: 4
- All victories: 11
- Individual podiums: 20
- All podiums: 49
- Discipline titles: 1: 1 Individual (2000–01)
Medal record
Men's biathlon
Representing Russia
World Championships
Gold medal – first place	2000 Lahti	4 × 7.5 km relay
Silver medal – second place	1996 Ruhpolding	Team event
Silver medal – second place	1999 Kontiolahti	4 × 7.5 km relay
Silver medal – second place	2003 Khanty-Mansiysk	4 × 7.5 km relay
Silver medal – second place	2005 Hochfilzen	4 × 7.5 km relay
Silver medal – second place	2005 Khanty-Mansiysk	Mixed relay
Bronze medal – third place	1998 Hochfilzen	Team event

Sergei Leonidovich Rozhkov (Russian: Серге́й Леони́дович Рожко́в; born 1 April 1972) is a former Russian biathlete.

== Biathlon results ==
All results are sourced from the International Biathlon Union.

=== Olympic Games ===
Event	Individual	Sprint	Pursuit	Mass start	Relay
(United States) 2002 Salt Lake City	12th	51st	27th	—N/a	4th
(Italy) 2006 Turin	—	—	—	20th	—

*Mass start was added as an event in 2006.

=== World Championships ===
7 medals (1 gold, 5 silver, 1 bronze)

Event	Individual	Sprint	Pursuit	Mass start	Team	Relay	Mixed relay
(Germany) 1996 Ruhpolding	—	—	—N/a	—N/a	Silver	—	—N/a
(Slovakia) 1997 Brezno-Osrblie	4th	—	—	—N/a	—	—	—N/a
(Slovenia) 1998 Pokljuka	—N/a	—N/a	6th	—N/a	Bronze	—N/a	—N/a
(Finland) 1999 Kontiolahti	—	53rd	18th	—	—N/a	Silver	—N/a
(Norway) 2000 Oslo Holmenkollen	40th	9th	11th	—	—N/a	Gold	—N/a
(Slovenia) 2001 Pokljuka	4th	20th	15th	7th	—N/a	4th	—N/a
(Norway) 2002 Oslo Holmenkollen	—N/a	—N/a	—N/a	17th	—N/a	—N/a	—N/a
(Russia) 2003 Khanty-Mansiysk	11th	15th	4th	25th	—N/a	Silver	—N/a
(Germany) 2004 Oberhof	6th	7th	10th	14th	—N/a	5th	—N/a
(Austria) 2005 Hochfilzen	—	14th	17th	27th	—N/a	Silver	Silver
(Italy) 2007 Antholz-Anterselva	15th	—	—	13th	—N/a	—	—

*During Olympic seasons competitions are only held for those events not included in the Olympic program.
**Team was removed as an event in 1998, and pursuit was added in 1997 with mass start being added in 1999 and the mixed relay in 2005.

=== Individual victories ===
4 victories (2 In, 2 Sp)

Season	Date	Location	Discipline	Level
1995–96; 1 victory (1 In)	7 March 1996	(Slovenia) Pokljuka	20 km individual	Biathlon World Cup
2000–01; 1 victory (1 In)	14 December 2000	(Italy) Antholz-Anterselva	20 km individual	Biathlon World Cup
2003–04; 1 victory (1 Sp)	19 December 2003	(Slovakia) Brezno-Osrblie	10 km sprint	Biathlon World Cup
2004–05; 1 victory (1 Sp)	13 February 2005	(Italy) Sansicario	10 km sprint	Biathlon World Cup

*Results are from UIPMB and IBU races which include the Biathlon World Cup, Biathlon World Championships and the Winter Olympic Games.
