= Andrea Henkel =

German biathlete (born 1977)

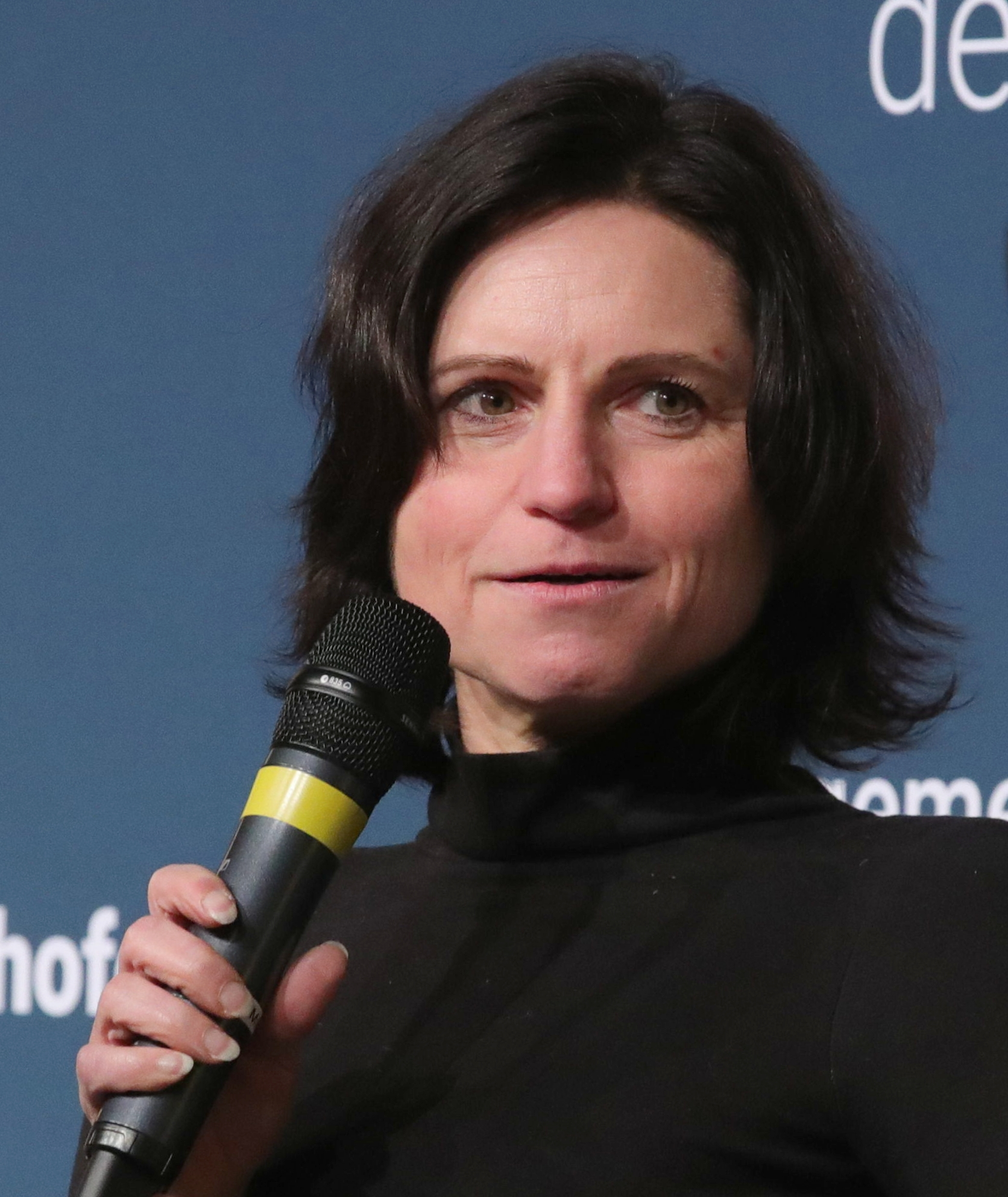
- Henkel in 2023

Personal information
- Full name: Andrea Henkel
- Born: 10 December 1977 (age 48) Ilmenau, Bezirk Suhl, East Germany
- Height: 1.58 m (5 ft 2 in)

Sport

Professional information
- Sport: Biathlon
- Club: WSV Oberhof 05
- World Cup debut: 16 March 1995
- Retired: 23 March 2014

Olympic Games
- Teams: 4 (2002, 2006, 2010, 2014)
- Medals: 4 (2 gold)

World Championships
- Teams: 14 (1999, 2000, 2001, 2002, 2003, 2004, 2005, 2006, 2007, 2008, 2009, 2011, 2012, 2013)
- Medals: 16 (8 gold)

World Cup
- Seasons: 17 (1994/95, 1998/99–2013/14)
- Individual races: 377
- All races: 443
- Individual victories: 22
- All victories: 46
- Individual podiums: 59
- All podiums: 106
- Overall titles: 1 (2006–07)
- Discipline titles: 1: 1 Individual (2006–07)
Medal record
Women's biathlon
Representing Germany
Event	1st	2nd	3rd
Olympic Games	2	1	1
World Championships	8	6	2
Junior World Championships	1	0	0
Total (21 medals)	11	7	3
Olympic Games
Gold medal – first place	2002 Salt Lake City	15 km individual
Gold medal – first place	2002 Salt Lake City	4 × 7.5 km relay
Silver medal – second place	2006 Torino	4 × 6 km relay
Bronze medal – third place	2010 Vancouver	4 × 6 km relay
World Championships
Gold medal – first place	2005 Hochfilzen	15 km individual
Gold medal – first place	2007 Antholz-Anterselva	12.5 km mass start
Gold medal – first place	2007 Antholz-Anterselva	4 × 6 km relay
Gold medal – first place	2008 Östersund	7.5 km sprint
Gold medal – first place	2008 Östersund	10 km pursuit
Gold medal – first place	2008 Östersund	4 × 6 km relay
Gold medal – first place	2011 Khanty-Mansiysk	4 × 6 km relay
Gold medal – first place	2012 Ruhpolding	4 × 6 km relay
Silver medal – second place	2000 Oslo	4 × 7.5 km relay
Silver medal – second place	2001 Pokljuka	4 × 7.5 km relay
Silver medal – second place	2005 Hochfilzen	4 × 6 km relay
Silver medal – second place	2009 Pyeongchang	4 × 6 km relay
Silver medal – second place	2011 Khanty-Mansiysk	Mixed relay
Silver medal – second place	2013 Nové Město	15 km individual
Bronze medal – third place	2009 Pyeongchang	Mixed relay
Bronze medal – third place	2012 Ruhpolding	Mixed relay
Junior World Championships
Gold medal – first place	1997 Forni Avoltri	7.5 km sprint
Silver medal – second place	1997 Forni Avoltri	3 × 7.5 km relay
Bronze medal – third place	1997 Forni Avoltri	7.5 km team

Andrea Burke (née Henkel; born 10 December 1977) is a retired German professional biathlete and the younger sister of Manuela Henkel, a successful cross-country skier. She trained at SV Großbreitenbach. Andrea Henkel started out as a cross-country skier but later specialised in biathlon when women's biathlon became an Olympic sport.

Since the 1998/99 season, she was a regular member of the German team in the Biathlon World Cup. After several top-ten results, she could win her first World Cup event in 1999, her second year. She was most successful in the 2006/07 season, which she finished first in the overall standings.

Henkel has won four Olympic medals: one gold medal at the 2002 Winter Olympics in the 15 km individual, and a gold (2002), silver (2006) and bronze (2010) medal in relay competitions. She is also the first biathlete to become world champion in each individual event: 2005 in the 15 km individual, 2007 in the 12.5 km mass start, and 2008 in the 7.5 km sprint and subsequent 10 km pursuit. She has won a total of eight gold, six silver and two bronze medals at world championships. She retired from the sport at the end of the 2013/14 season.

== Other Achievements ==
- Biathlon Overall World Cup
  - 1 × overall winner (2006–07)
  - 5 × best German athlete in the Overall World Cup (5th in 1999-2000 and 2000–01; 1st in 2006–07; 2nd in 2010–11, 3rd in 2012–13)
- Biathlon discipline World Cup
  - 1 × Individual discipline World Cup winner (2006–07)
- race victories in Biathlon World Cup^{1}
  - 4 × Individual victories
  - 5 × Sprint victories
  - 8 × Pursuit victories
  - 5 × Mass Start victories
  - 14 × Relay victories

(^{1} race victories in Olympic Games and World Championships are included)

Season	Overall			Sprint			Pursuit			Individual			Mass Start		
Season	Races	Points	Position	Races	Points	Position	Races	Points	Position	Races	Points	Position	Races	Points	Position
1998–99	-	188	14th	–	–	–	–	–	–	–	–	–	–	–	–
1999–00	25/25	378	5th	–	–	–	–	–	–	–	–	–	–	–	–
2000–01	23/26	635	5th	9/10	210	10th	7/8	210	5th	4/4	110	4th	3/4	61	18th
2001–02	-	378	13th	–	98	17th	–	119	15th	–	117	4th	–	44	14th
2002–03	20/23	344	17th	8/9	135	15th	6/7	129	14th	3/3	33	19th	3/4	47	19th
2003–04	20/26	221	29th	8/10	64	29th	7/9	115	19th	3/3	8	41st	2/4	34	29th
2004–05	23/27	431	14th	8/10	134	18th	8/9	153	12th	3/4	54	15th	4/4	87	7th
2005–06	23/26	531	7th	9/10	171	14th	6/8	172	8th	3/3	52	12th	–	136	–
2006–07	23/27	870	1st	8/10	313	3rd	7/8	267	3rd	4/4	140	1st	4/5	116	19th
2007–08	26/26	766	3rd	10/10	299	4th	8/8	289	2nd	3/3	46	14th	5/5	125	6th
2008–09	26/26	838	5th	10/10	320	6th	7/7	234	4th	4/4	102	9th	5/5	157	5th
2009–10	25/25	781	4th	10/10	248	11th	6/6	194	5th	4/4	126	2nd	5/5	169	3rd
2010–11	26/26	972	2nd	10/10	349	4th	7/7	303	2nd	4/4	115	8th	5/5	205	4th
2011–12	26/26	806	8th	10/10	271	9th	8/8	276	7th	3/3	70	14th	5/5	196	4th
2012–13	26/26	856	3rd	10/10	307	7th	8/8	279	2nd	3/3	131	2nd	5/5	147	12th
2013–14	22/22	545	10th	8/8	183	11th	8/8	207	8th	2/2	55	11th	3/3	100	6th

=== Olympic Games ===
Event	Individual	Sprint	Pursuit	Mass Start	Relay	Mixed Relay
(United States) 2002 Salt Lake City	Gold	25th	13th	—N/a	Gold	—N/a
(Italy) 2006 Turin	4th	–	–	13th	Silver	—N/a
(Canada) 2010 Vancouver	6th	27th	10th	9th	Bronze	—N/a
(Russia) 2014 Sochi	–	22nd	29th	17th	11th	-

=== World Championships ===
Event	Individual	Sprint	Pursuit	Mass Start	Relay	Mixed Relay
(Finland) 1999 Kontiolahti	–	12th	18th	–	–	–
(Norway) 1999 Oslo	26th	–	–	20th	–	–
(Norway) 2000 Oslo	40th	8th	5th	16th	Silver	–
(Slovenia) 2001 Pokljuka	9th	11th	5th	–	Silver	–
(Russia) 2003 Khanty-Mansiysk	16th	–	–	–	–	–
(Germany) 2004 Oberhof	26th	–	–	–	–	–
(Austria) 2005 Hochfilzen	Gold	–	–	7th	Silver	–
(Slovenia) 2006 Pokljuka	Not held in an Olympic season					10th
(Italy) 2007 Antholz-Anterselva	6th	23rd	10th	Gold	Gold	–
(Sweden) 2008 Oestersund	22nd	Gold	Gold	22nd	Gold	–
(South Korea) 2009 Pyeongchang	10th	6th	DSQ	5th	Silver	Bronze
(Russia) 2011 Khanty-Mansiysk	46th	20th	4th	13th	Gold	Silver
(Germany) 2012 Ruhpolding	20th	34th	11th	12th	Gold	Bronze
(Czech Republic) 2013 Nové Město na Moravě	Silver	33rd	6th	13th	5th	13th

=== Individual victories ===
22 victories (5 Sp, 8 Pu, 4 In, 5 MS)

Season	Year	Event	Competition	Level
1999/00; 2 victories (1 Pu,1 MS)	19 December 1999	(Slovenia) Pokljuka	12.5 km Mass Start	Biathlon World Cup
1999/00; 2 victories (1 Pu,1 MS)	22 January 2000	(Italy) Antholz	10 km Pursuit	Biathlon World Cup
2001/02; 1 victory (1 In)	11 February 2002	(United States) Salt Lake City	15 km Individual	Winter Olympic Games
2004/05; 1 victory (1 In)	8 March 2005	(Austria) Hochfilzen	15 km Individual	Biathlon World Championships
2006/07; 6 victories (2 Sp, 1 Pu, 2 In, 1 MS)	8 December 2006	(Austria) Hochfilzen	7.5 km Sprint	Biathlon World Cup
2006/07; 6 victories (2 Sp, 1 Pu, 2 In, 1 MS)	9 December 2006	(Austria) Hochfilzen	10 km Pursuit	Biathlon World Cup
2006/07; 6 victories (2 Sp, 1 Pu, 2 In, 1 MS)	13 December 2006	(Austria) Hochfilzen	15 km Individual	Biathlon World Cup
2006/07; 6 victories (2 Sp, 1 Pu, 2 In, 1 MS)	11 February 2007	(Italy) Antholz	12.5 km Mass Start	Biathlon World Championships
2006/07; 6 victories (2 Sp, 1 Pu, 2 In, 1 MS)	28 February 2007	(Finland) Lahti	15 km Individual	Biathlon World Cup
2006/07; 6 victories (2 Sp, 1 Pu, 2 In, 1 MS)	8 March 2007	(Norway) Oslo	7.5 km Sprint	Biathlon World Cup
2007/08; 4 victories (1 Sp, 2 Pu, 1 MS)	19 January 2008	(Italy) Antholz	10 km Pursuit	Biathlon World Cup
2007/08; 4 victories (1 Sp, 2 Pu, 1 MS)	20 January 2008	(Italy) Antholz	12.5 km Mass Start	Biathlon World Cup
2007/08; 4 victories (1 Sp, 2 Pu, 1 MS)	9 February 2008	(Sweden) Östersund	7.5 km Sprint	Biathlon World Championships
2007/08; 4 victories (1 Sp, 2 Pu, 1 MS)	10 February 2008	(Sweden) Östersund	10 km Pursuit	Biathlon World Championships
2008/09; 2 victories (1 Sp, 1 Pu)	9 January 2009	(Germany) Oberhof	7.5 km Sprint	Biathlon World Cup
2008/09; 2 victories (1 Sp, 1 Pu)	21 March 2009	(Norway) Trondheim	10 km Pursuit	Biathlon World Cup
2009/10; 2 victories (1 Pu, 1 MS)	10 January 2010	(Germany) Oberhof	12.5 km Mass Start	Biathlon World Cup
2009/10; 2 victories (1 Pu, 1 MS)	24 January 2010	(Italy) Antholz	10 km Pursuit	Biathlon World Cup
2010/11; 2 victories (1 Sp, 1 Pu)	11 February 2011	(United States) Fort Kent	7.5 km Sprint	Biathlon World Cup
2010/11; 2 victories (1 Sp, 1 Pu)	12 February 2011	(United States) Fort Kent	10 km Pursuit	Biathlon World Cup
2011/12; 1 victory (1 MS)	5 February 2012	(Norway) Oslo	12.5 km Mass Start	Biathlon World Cup
2013/14; 1 victory (1 Pu)	18 January 2014	(Italy) Antholz	10 km Pursuit	Biathlon World Cup

*Results are from IBU races which include the Biathlon World Cup, Biathlon World Championships and the Winter Olympic Games.

== Personal life ==
On 25 October 2014 Henkel married the American biathlete Tim Burke.
