= Olga Zaitseva =

Russian biathlete (born 1978)

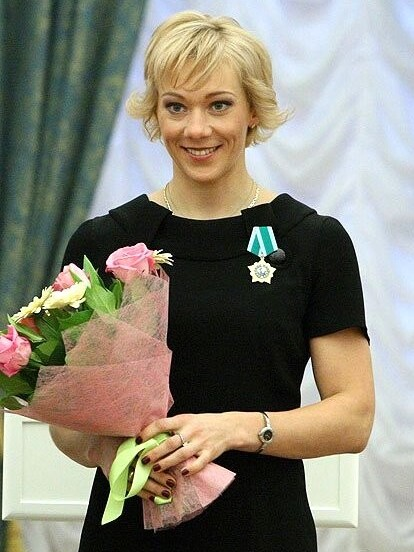
- Zaitseva at an awards ceremony in the Kremlin in 2010

Personal information
- Full name: Olga Alekseyevna Zaitseva
- Nickname: "Bunny" (Russian: Зайка)
- Born: 16 May 1978 (age 48) Moscow, Russian SFSR, Soviet Union
- Height: 1.68 m (5 ft 6 in)
- Weight: 66 kg (146 lb)
- Website: www.zajceva.ru

Sport

Professional information
- Sport: Biathlon
- Club: Dynamo Moscow, CSKA Moscow
- World Cup debut: 12 February 2000
- Retired: 24 January 2015

Olympic Games
- Teams: 4 (2002, 2006, 2010, 2014)
- Medals: 3 (2 gold)

World Championships
- Teams: 8 (2003, 2004, 2005, 2009, 2010, 2011, 2012, 2013)
- Medals: 8 (3 gold)

World Cup
- Seasons: 12 (1999/00, 2001/02–2005/06, 2008/09–2013/14)
- Individual races: 174
- All races: 208
- Individual victories: 12
- All victories: 26
- Individual podiums: 37
- All podiums: 60
- Discipline titles: 1: 1 Mass start (2004–05)
Medal record
Women's biathlon
Representing Russia
Olympic Games
Gold medal – first place	2006 Turin	4 × 6 km relay
Gold medal – first place	2010 Vancouver	4 × 6 km relay
Silver medal – second place	2010 Vancouver	12.5 km mass start
Disqualified	2014 Sochi	4 × 6 km relay
World Championships
Gold medal – first place	2005 Hochfilzen	4 × 6 km relay
Gold medal – first place	2009 Pyeongchang	12.5 km mass start
Gold medal – first place	2009 Pyeongchang	4 × 6 km relay
Silver medal – second place	2005 Hochfilzen	7.5 km sprint
Silver medal – second place	2005 Khanty-Mansiysk	Mixed relay
Bronze medal – third place	2005 Hochfilzen	10 km pursuit
Bronze medal – third place	2009 Pyeongchang	7.5 km sprint
Bronze medal – third place	2009 Pyeongchang	10 km pursuit
Junior World Championships
Gold medal – first place	1998 Jericho/Valcartier	Team
Bronze medal – third place	1998 Jericho/Valcartier	Individual

Olga Alekseyevna Zaitseva (Russian: Ольга Алексеевна Зайцева; born 16 May 1978) is a former Russian biathlete. She began her career in 1994. After not competing in the 2014–15 season, Zaitseva announced her retirement on 24 January 2015. Shortly afterwards she announced that she had been appointed as caretaker head coach of the Russian biathlon team.

== Record ==
=== Olympic Games ===
Zaitseva has won two gold medals and one silver medal at the Winter Olympic Games.

On 1 December 2017, she was disqualified from the 2014 Winter Olympics for doping offences. She appealed this decision to the Court of Arbitration for Sport in 2018. After a postponement that lasted until 2020, the Court of Arbitration for Sport upheld her disqualification; however, it lifted her lifetime ban from all Olympic Games.

Event	Individual	Sprint	Pursuit	Mass Start	Relay	Mixed Relay
(United States) 2002 Salt Lake City	37th	—	—	—	—	—N/a
(Italy) 2006 Torino	—	9th	19th	15th	Gold	—N/a
(Canada) 2010 Vancouver	26th	7th	7th	Silver	Gold	—N/a
(Russia) 2014 Sochi	DSQ (15th)	DSQ (28th)	DSQ (11th)	DSQ (23rd)	DSQ (2nd)	DSQ (4th)

=== World Championships ===
Zaitseva has won eight medals — three gold, two silver and three bronze. All her World Championship medals Zaitseva won in two Championships: 2005 Hochfilzen, Austria and 2009 Pyeongchang, South Korea.

Event	Individual	Sprint	Pursuit	Mass Start	Relay	Mixed Relay
(Russia) 2003 Khanty-Mansiysk	32nd	—	—	—	—	—N/a
(Germany) 2004 Oberhof	49th	—	—	20th	—	—N/a
(Austria) 2005 Hochfilzen	—	Silver	Bronze	17th	Gold	Silver^{[b]}
(South Korea) 2009 Pyeongchang	14th	Bronze	Bronze	Gold	Gold	5th
(Russia) 2011 Khanty-Mansiysk	—	4th	12th	6th	8th	6th
2012 Ruhpolding, Germany	6th	16th	7th	DSQ	7th	5th
(Czech Republic) 2013 Nové Město	6th	4th	4th	5th	4th	6th

=== World Cup ===
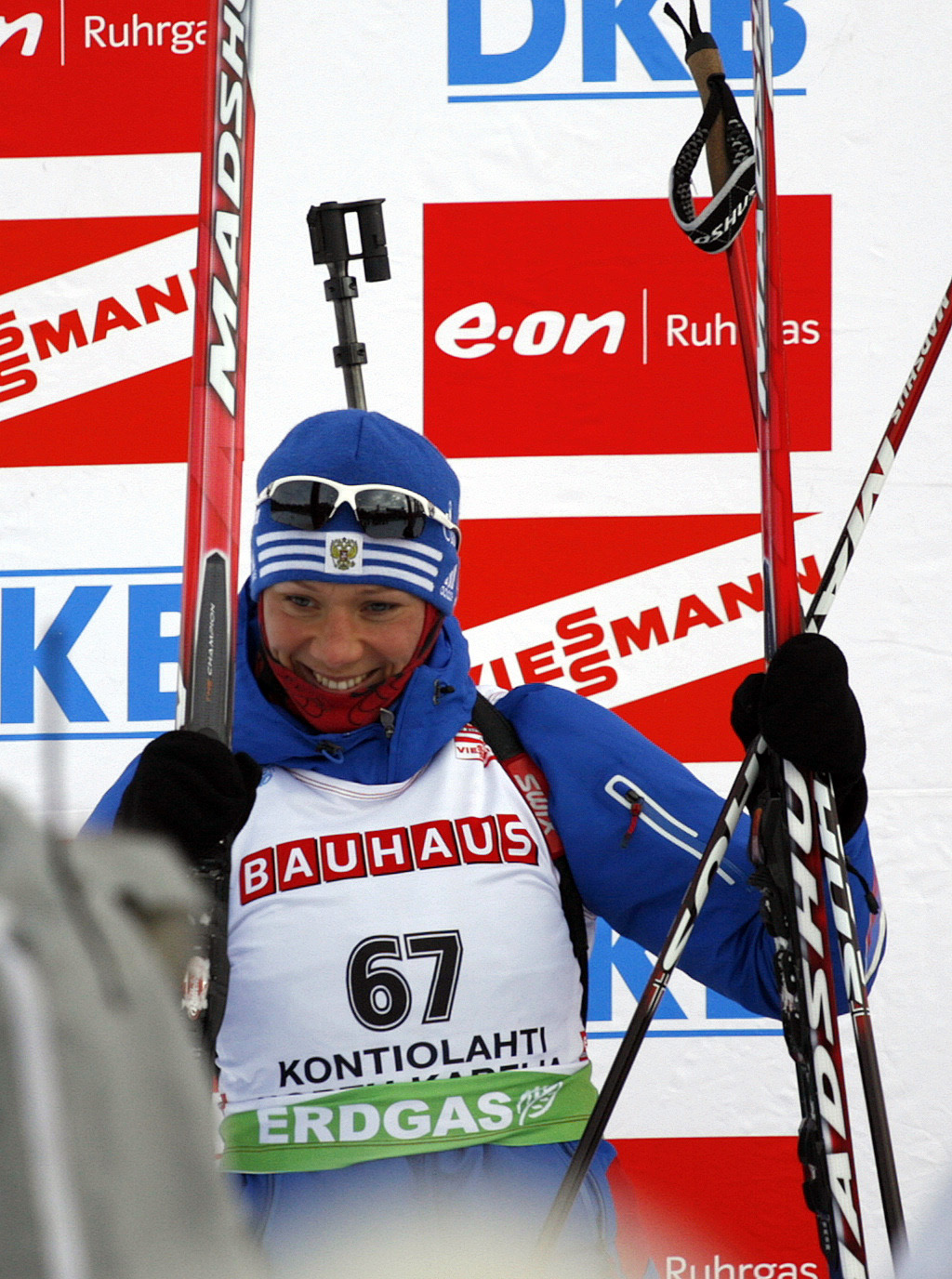
Olga Zaitseva Kontiolahti 2010

During her first 1999—2000 World Cup season, Zaitseva only appeared in one race, didn't scoring for the overall standings. Starting from the second half 2001—02 season, she became a regular in the Russian World Cup team. The best result is the 4th place in the 2004—05 season and winning the mass start discipline cup of the same season. All her results from the 2013-14 season after Sochi were voided due to doping offences.

No.	Season	Individual			Sprint			Pursuit			Mass Start			Overall		
No.	Season	Races	Points	Position	Races	Points	Position	Races	Points	Position	Races	Points	Position	Races	Points	Position
1	2001–02	1/4	–	–	4/8	24	44th	4/9	39	36th	1/3	16	31st	10/24	79	42nd
2	2002–03	2/3	50	14th	8/9	103	23rd	6/7	133	12th	3/4	10	36th	19/23	296	19th
3	2003–04	2/3	14	30th	8/10	208	11th	7/9	209	9th	4/4^{[c]}	55	19th	21/26	489	10th
4	2004–05	2/4	20	36th	9/10	292	3rd	8/9	290	3rd	4/4^{[c]}	136	1st	23/27	752	4th
5	2005–06	2/3	66	8th	8/10	165	15th	6/8	135	14th	4/5	77	14th	20/26	443	15th
6	2006–07	Temporary retirement from the sport due to marriage and childbirth.														
7	2007–08	Temporary retirement from the sport due to marriage and childbirth.														
8	2008–09^{[d]}	4/4^{[c]}	113	5th	10/10^{[c]}	308	7th	7/7^{[c]}	219	7th	5/5^{[c]}	162	4th	26/26^{[e]}	834	6th
9	2009–10^{[d]}	3/4	58	24th	9/10	281	7th	5/6	207	3rd	5/5^{[c]}	154	5th	22/25	719	8th
10	2010–11^{[d]}	3/4	138	3rd	8/10	242	13th	5/7	131	17th	4/5	131	11th	20/26	642	12th
11	2011–12^{[d]}	2/3	70	6th	5/10	228	2nd	4/8	180	2nd	1/5	43	4th	12/26	521	3rd

*Key:Races—number of entered races/all races; Points—won World Cup points; Position—World Cup season ranking.
**2011–12 season in progress. Statistics as of 15 January 2012.

==== World Cup wins ====
Over the course of her career, Zaitseva has reached twelve personal World Cup wins. In the history of the International Biathlon Union she is ranked twelfth for all-time career victories. In addition, she has won twelve relay races and two mixed relay events as part of the Russian World Cup team.

Individual wins (13)
No.	Date	Location	Discipline
1	5 December 2002	Östersund, Sweden	Sprint
2	22 February 2003	Östersund, Sweden	Individual
3	11 December 2004	Oslo – Holmenkollen, Norway	Sprint
4	18 December 2004	Östersund, Sweden	Pursuit
5	19 March 2005	Khanty-Mansiysk, Russia	Mass Start
6	27 November 2005	Östersund, Sweden	Pursuit
7	22 February 2009	Pyeongchang, South Korea (WCH)	Mass Start
8	19 March 2009	Trondheim, Norway	Sprint
9	13 January 2011	Ruhpolding, Germany	Individual
10	16 December 2011	Hochfilzen, Austria	Sprint
11	17 December 2011	Hochfilzen, Austria	Pursuit
12	13 January 2012	Nove Mesto, Czech Republic	Sprint
13	6 January 2013	Oberhof, Germany	Pursuit

Relay wins (14)
No.	Date	Location	Discipline
1	16 January 2003	Ruhpolding, Germany	Mixed Relay
2	13 February 2003	Oslo – Holmenkollen, Norway	Relay
3	5 December 2004	Beitostølen, Norway	Relay
4	12 January 2005	Ruhpolding, Germany	Relay
5	13 February 2005	Torino – Cesana San Sicario, Italy	Relay
6	11 March 2005	Hochfilzen, Austria (WCH)	Relay
7	11 January 2006	Ruhpolding, Germany	Relay
8	23 February 2006	Torino – Cesana San Sicario, Italy (OG)	Relay
9	21 February 2009	Pyeongchang, South Korea (WCH)	Relay
10	13 December 2009	Hochfilzen, Austria	Relay
11	23 February 2010	Vancouver, Canada (OG)	Relay
12	22 January 2011	Antholz – Anterselva, Italy	Relay
13	18 December 2011	Hochfilzen, Austria	Mixed Relay
14	4 January 2012	Oberhof, Germany	Relay

- Key:WCH—World Championships; OG—Olympic Games.
  - 2011–12 season in progress. Statistics as of 15 January 2012.

=== Overall record ===
As of January 2012, Zaitseva has competed in a total of 208 races at senior level, winning 26 of them (a 12.5 win percentage), including 174 races with 12 wins (a 6.9 win percentage) in individual events. She has claimed at least two wins in each discipline of biathlon. Zaitseva has reached a total of 60 World Cup podiums (28.8%): 37 in individual races (21.3%) and 23 in team events (67.6%). In addition, she has achieved 120 top ten finishes — 57.7% of all the races she has entered (including 88 top ten results (50.6%) in individual races).

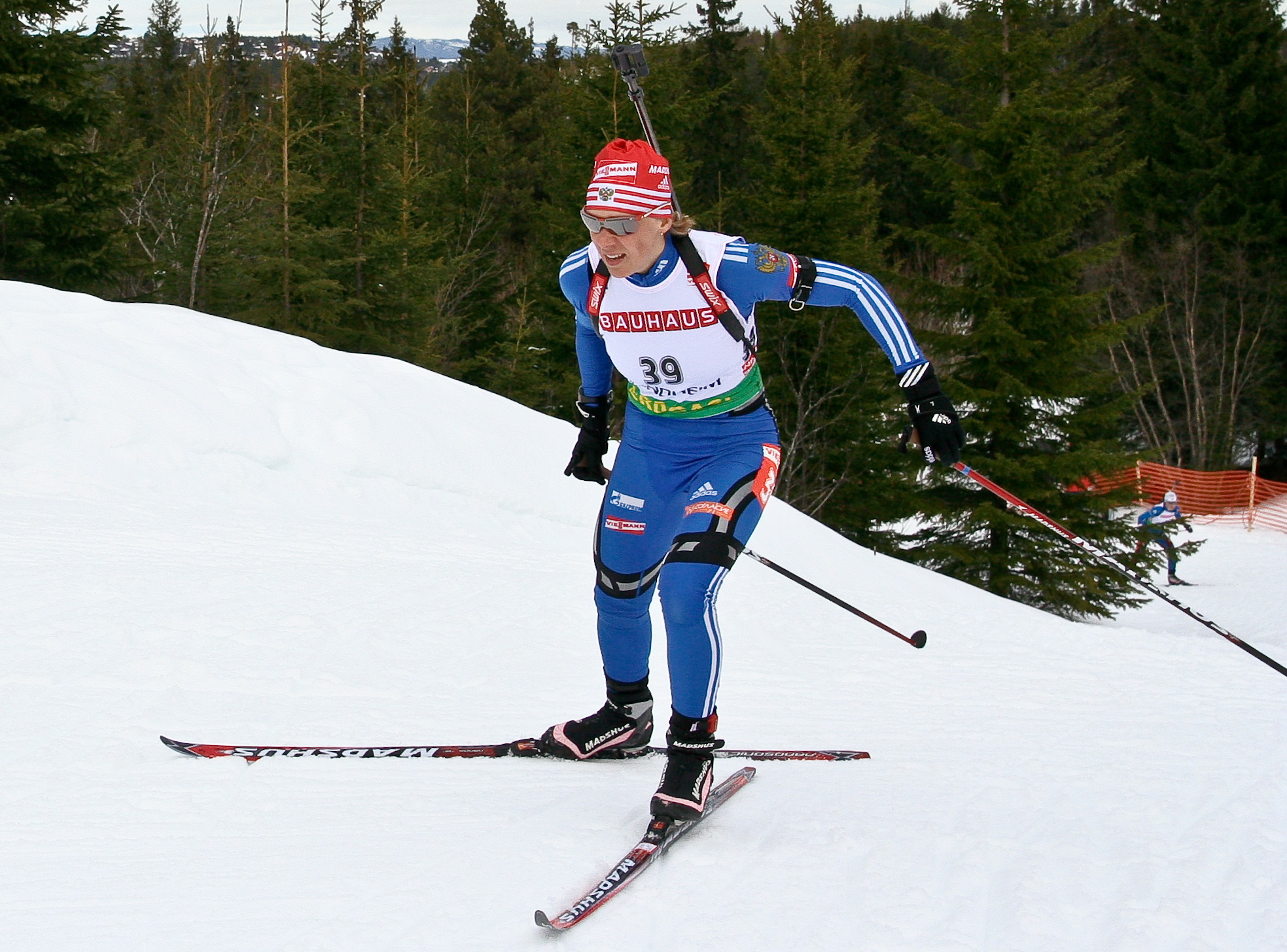
Olga Zaitseva strive for victory on 19 March 2009

Result	Individual	Sprint	Pursuit	Mass Start	Relay	Mixed Relay	Total		
Result	Individual	Sprint	Pursuit	Mass Start	Relay	Mixed Relay	Individual events	Team events	All events
1st Place	2	5	3	2	12	2	12	14	26
2nd Place	2	3	4	2	5	1	11	6	17
3rd Place	—	7	6	1	3	—	14	3	17
Podiums	4	15	13	5	20	3	37	23	60
Top 10	9	35	29	15	25	7	88	32	120
Points	16	61	50	29	25	7	156	32	188
Other	5	9	2	2^{[f]}	2^{[g]}	—	18	2	20
Starts	21	70	52	31	27	7	174	34	208

*Results in all IBU World Cup races. Statistics as of 15 January 2012.

== Achievements and honours ==
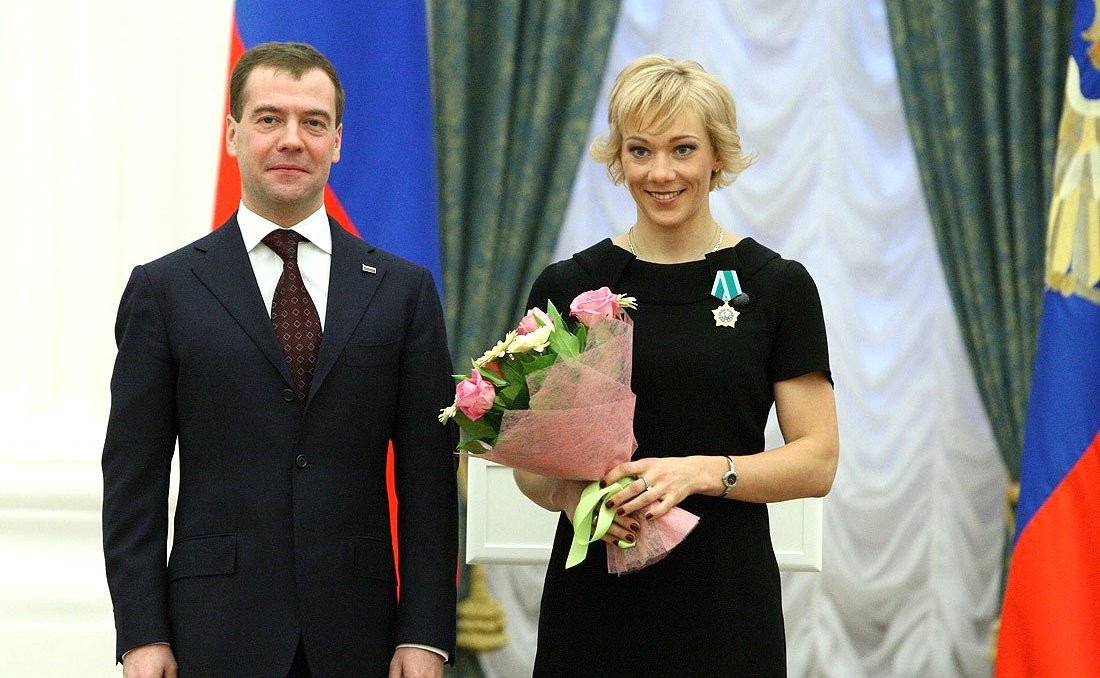
Olga Zaitseva with the President of Russia Dmitriy Medvedev at the awards ceremony in the Kremlin in March 2010

Sport titles

- Winter Olympics
  - 2010 – Gold medal in the Relay, silver medal in the 12.5 km Mass Start
  - 2006 – Gold medal in the Relay
- World Championships
  - 2009 – Gold medal in the 12.5 km Mass Start and Relay, bronze in the 7.5 km Sprint and 10 km Pursuit
  - 2005 – Gold medal in the Relay, silver in the 7.5 km Sprint and Mixed Relay and bronze in the 10 km Pursuit.
- Mass Start World Cup winner — 2004–05

State Decorations and Awards

- The Order of Friendship (5 March 2010).
- Medal of the Order "For Merits to the Fatherland" 2nd Class (22 February 2007).
- Medal of the Order "For Merits to the Fatherland" 2nd Class (17 January 2003).
- Honoured Master of Sports (2005).

Other awards

- The Best Russian Athlete of the Year according to the vote at Sportbox.ru — 2011.

== Personal life ==
Zaitseva has two sisters: Elena (b. 1976) and Oksana (b. 1973), who was her coach.

On 30 September 2006, Zaitseva married Milan Augustin, a Slovak biathlon coach; they had a son Aleksandr in 2007, but divorced in 2013. In October 2015, Zaitseva gave birth to her second son Stepan. Around that time, she stopped coaching and was employed as a consultant for the Russian biathlon team. She was expected to return to coaching in 2016.

== Notes ==
a. ^{1} ^{2} The mixed relay, contested for the first time in the World Championships, was held in 2005.
b. ^{1} The mixed relay was held in Khanty-Mansiysk, Russia.
c. ^{1} ^{2} ^{3} ^{4} ^{5} ^{6} ^{7} Until 2010—11 season it was required to leave out the result of the worst discipline race for the final result of discipline world cup (if there were four discipline races or more during the season), so the points in respective columnes «Points» is represented after deduction of the result of the worst discipline race.
d. ^{1} ^{2} ^{3} ^{4} Since 2008—09 season it was applied another points system in World Cup. Earlier biathlete got 50 points for win and top-30 was awarded. Now World Cup give 60 points and top-40 awarded.
e. ^{1} Until 2010—11 season it was required to leave out the results of the three worst races for the final result of overall world cup, so the points in respective column «Points» is represented after deduction of the results of the three worst discipline races.
f. ^{1} Did not finish (DNF).
g. ^{1} Disqualified (DSQ).
