= Stian Eckhoff =

Norwegian biathlete (born 1979)

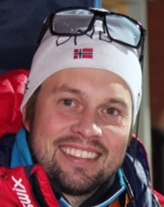

Personal information
- Full name: Stian Kampenhaug Eckhoff
- Born: 3 September 1979 (age 46) Trondheim, Norway
- Height: 1.78 m (5 ft 10 in)

Sport

Professional information
- Sport: Biathlon
- Club: Fossum IF
- World Cup debut: 11 February 2000

Olympic Games
- Teams: 1 (2006)
- Medals: 1 (0 gold)

World Championships
- Teams: 3 (2003, 2004, 2005)
- Medals: 1 (1 gold)

World Cup
- Seasons: 10 (1999/00–2008/09)
- Individual victories: 2
- All victories: 8
- Individual podiums: 7
- All podiums: 18
Medal record
Men's biathlon
Representing Norway
World Championships
Gold medal – first place	2005 Hochfilzen	4 × 7.5 km relay
Junior World Championships
Silver medal – second place	1999 Pokljuka	4 × 7.5 km relay

Stian Kampenhaug Eckhoff (born 3 September 1979) is a former Norwegian biathlete. He has 2 World Cup victories and in the 2004–05 season, Eckhoff placed tenth overall. Since his retirement he has become involved in coaching the Norwegian national biathlon team, and was appointed head coach of the Norwegian women's biathlon programme ahead of the 2014–15 season. He is the brother of fellow biathlete Tiril Eckhoff.

== Biathlon results ==
All results are sourced from the International Biathlon Union.

=== Olympic Games ===
Event	Individual	Sprint	Pursuit	Mass start	Relay
(Italy) 2006 Turin	16th	16th	21st	—	5th

=== World Championships ===
1 medal (1 gold)

Event	Individual	Sprint	Pursuit	Mass start	Relay	Mixed relay
(Russia) 2003 Khanty-Mansiysk	35th	35th	33rd	9th	—	—N/a
(Germany) 2004 Oberhof	48th	28th	19th	25th	—	—N/a
(Austria) 2005 Hochfilzen	27th	—	—	14th	Gold	10th

*During Olympic seasons competitions are only held for those events not included in the Olympic program.
**The mixed relay was added as an event in 2005.

=== Individual victories ===
2 victories (2 Sp)

Season	Date	Location	Discipline	Level
2004–05; 1 victory (1 Sp)	15 December 2004	(Sweden) Östersund	10 km sprint	Biathlon World Cup
2005–06; 1 victory (1 Sp)	26 November 2005	(Sweden) Östersund	10 km sprint	Biathlon World Cup

*Results are from UIPMB and IBU races which include the Biathlon World Cup, Biathlon World Championships and the Winter Olympic Games.
