= Michael Greis =

German biathlete (born 1976)

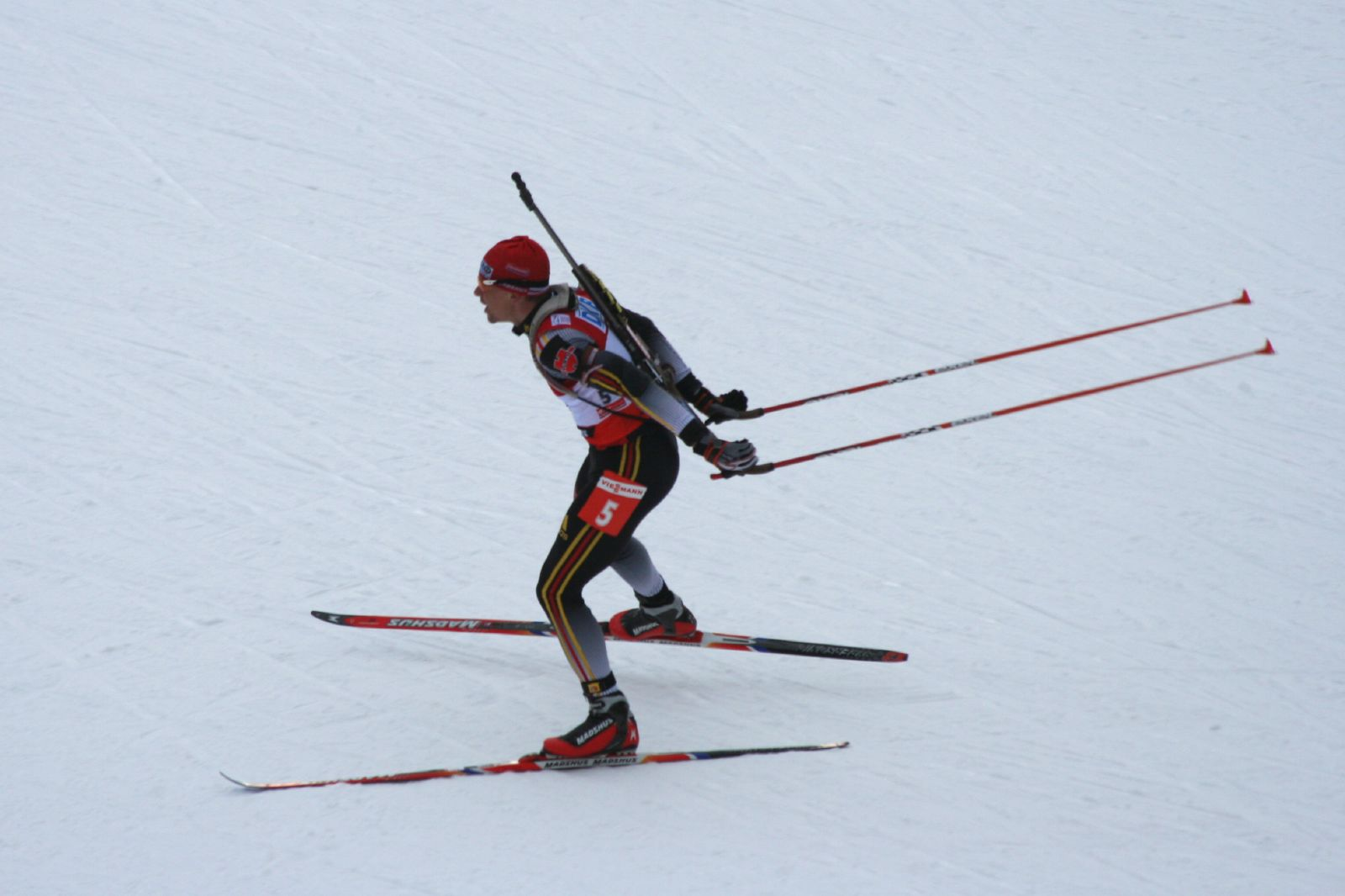
- Greis at the World Championships in Antholz-Anterselva.

Personal information
- Full name: Michael Greis
- Nickname: Michi
- Born: 18 August 1976 (age 50) Füssen, West Germany
- Height: 1.77 m (5 ft 10 in)

Sport

Professional information
- Sport: Biathlon
- Club: SK Nesselwang
- World Cup debut: 28 February 2001
- Retired: 5 December 2012

Olympic Games
- Teams: 3 (2002, 2006, 2010)
- Medals: 3 (3 gold)

World Championships
- Teams: 9 (2002, 2003, 2004, 2005, 2007, 2008, 2009, 2011, 2012)
- Medals: 12 (3 gold)

World Cup
- Seasons: 13 (2000/01–2012/13)
- Individual victories: 11
- All victories: 21
- Individual podiums: 34
- All podiums: 64
- Overall titles: 1 (2006–07)
- Discipline titles: 4: 3 Individual (2004–05, 2005–06, 2008–09); 1 Sprint (2006–07)
Medal record
Men's biathlon
Representing Germany
Olympic Games
Gold medal – first place	2006 Turin	20 km individual
Gold medal – first place	2006 Turin	15 km mass start
Gold medal – first place	2006 Turin	4 × 7.5 km relay
World Championships
Gold medal – first place	2004 Oberhof	4 × 7.5 km relay
Gold medal – first place	2007 Antholz-Anterselva	15 km mass start
Gold medal – first place	2008 Östersund	Mixed relay
Silver medal – second place	2005 Hochfilzen	20 km individual
Silver medal – second place	2007 Antholz-Anterselva	20 km individual
Silver medal – second place	2011 Khanty-Mansiysk	Mixed relay
Bronze medal – third place	2005 Khanty-Mansiysk	Mixed relay
Bronze medal – third place	2007 Antholz-Anterselva	4 × 7.5 km relay
Bronze medal – third place	2008 Östersund	4 × 7.5 km relay
Bronze medal – third place	2009 Pyeongchang	4 × 7.5 km relay
Bronze medal – third place	2009 Pyeongchang	Mixed relay
Bronze medal – third place	2012 Ruhpolding	4 × 7.5 km relay

Michael Greis (German pronunciation: [ˈmɪçaʔeːl ˈɡʁaɪs]; born 18 August 1976) is a German former biathlete.

== Career ==
Greis first competed at the 2002 Winter Olympics in Salt Lake City, finishing 15th and 16th in the 10 km sprint and 12.5 km pursuit events in the biathlon.

Greis won the World Cup in the individual category in 2004/05, and was a member of the winning 4 × 7.5 km relay team in the 2004 Biathlon World Championships, and took silver in the individual 20 km category at the 2005 World Championships.

At the 2006 Winter Olympics, Greis came into the games heading the World Cup standings and took the first Olympic gold of the games with victory in the individual 20 km ahead of the defending Olympic champion Ole Einar Bjørndalen. He was also a member of the German team that won the 4 × 7.5 km relay.

On 25 February 2006 Greis won the men's 15 km event and became the first person to capture three gold medals at the Turin Olympic Games. (Koreans Jin Sun-Yu and Ahn Hyun Soo became the second and third later on the same day with victories in short track speed skating.)

Greis was named German sportsman of the year, along with fellow biathlete Kati Wilhelm, by journalists.

In the 2006/07 World Cup season, Greis won the Overall and the Sprint competition.

In the 2007/08 World Cup season Greis managed onto the podium on a regular basis, attaining three victories, three 2nd places as well as three 3rds. At the season's World Champs in Östersund Greis did not participate in the sprint and in the pursuit but being anchor both in the men's Relay and the mixed Relay, helped to secure a gold and a bronze for his team.

Prior to the 2008/09 World Cup season Greis had had a serious disagreement with the Germans' head coach Frank Ullrich the reason being Ullrich's authoritative management of the team, which resulted in Greis' departure from Ullrich's jurisdiction to train on his own. This yielded him quite a solid performance throughout the year, with another two World Cup victories and the relay bronze at the Biathlon World Championships 2009 in South Korea.

Greis participated in the 2010 Olympic Games in Vancouver, Canada which turned to be a disappointing performance for his fans as he finished in the mediocre 10th place twice, in the Individual and the Mass Start, along with coming 5th in the relay and the pursuit, adding to a streak of unsuccessful Olympic performances by the German biathlon male team when not a single German won any medal in biathlon for the first time in the Olympic history.

After the first round of the 2012–13 World Cup, Greis announced his retirement on 5 December 2012 citing a lack of motivation, making the 20 km in Östersund on 28 November his last competition as he had dropped the sprint and pursuit. After retiring, Greis studied International Management at Ansbach University of Applied Sciences. He also worked as a pundit for Eurosport. Subsequently in 2016 he was appointed as head coach at the national biathlon training centre for east Switzerland at Lenzerheide, where he coached youth biathletes. After two years in this post, in April 2018 he was announced as head coach of the United States men's biathlon team. After one season in this role, in May 2019 he was named as head coach for the Polish women's biathlon team.

== Biathlon results ==
All results are sourced from the International Biathlon Union.

=== Olympic Games ===
3 medals (3 gold)

Event	Individual	Sprint	Pursuit	Mass start	Relay
(United States) 2002 Salt Lake City	—	15th	16th	—N/a	—
(Italy) 2006 Turin	Gold	33rd	8th	Gold	Gold
(Canada) 2010 Vancouver	10th	21st	5th	10th	5th

*Mass start was added as an event in 2006.

=== World Championships ===
12 medals (3 gold, 3 silver, 6 bronze)

Event	Individual	Sprint	Pursuit	Mass start	Relay	Mixed relay
(Norway) 2002 Oslo Holmenkollen	—N/a	—N/a	—N/a	19th	—N/a	—N/a
(Russia) 2003 Khanty-Mansiysk	—	29th	DNS	—	—	—N/a
(Germany) 2004 Oberhof	—	5th	9th	21st	Gold	—N/a
(Austria) 2005 Hochfilzen	Silver	6th	5th	10th	6th	Bronze
(Italy) 2007 Antholz-Anterselva	Silver	19th	12th	Gold	Bronze	5th
(Sweden) 2008 Östersund	36th	—	—	13th	Bronze	Gold
(South Korea) 2009 Pyeongchang	19th	7th	13th	DNF	Bronze	Bronze
(Russia) 2011 Khanty-Mansiysk	7th	9th	11th	20th	7th	Silver
(Germany) 2012 Ruhpolding	11th	26th	23rd	22nd	Bronze	—

*During Olympic seasons competitions are only held for those events not included in the Olympic program.
**The mixed relay was added as an event in 2005.

=== Individual victories ===
11 victories (3 In, 4 Sp, 2 Pu, 2 MS)

Season	Date	Location	Discipline	Level
2004–05; 1 victory (1 In)	9 February 2005	(Italy) Turin	20 km individual	Biathlon World Cup
2005–06; 2 victories (1 In, 1 MS)	11 February 2006	(Italy) Turin	20 km individual	Winter Olympic Games
2005–06; 2 victories (1 In, 1 MS)	25 February 2006	(Italy) Turin	15 km mass start	Winter Olympic Games
2006–07; 2 victories (1 Sp, 1 MS)	14 December 2006	(Austria) Hochfilzen	10 km sprint	Biathlon World Cup
2006–07; 2 victories (1 Sp, 1 MS)	11 February 2007	(Italy) Antholz-Anterselva	15 km mass start	Biathlon World Championships
2007–08; 4 victories (2 Sp, 2 Pu)	12 January 2008	(Germany) Ruhpolding	10 km sprint	Biathlon World Cup
2007–08; 4 victories (2 Sp, 2 Pu)	13 January 2008	(Germany) Ruhpolding	12.5 km pursuit	Biathlon World Cup
2007–08; 4 victories (2 Sp, 2 Pu)	18 January 2008	(Italy) Antholz-Anterselva	10 km sprint	Biathlon World Cup
2007–08; 4 victories (2 Sp, 2 Pu)	29 February 2008	(South Korea) Pyeongchang	12.5 km pursuit	Biathlon World Cup
2008–09; 2 victories (1 In, 1 Sp)	3 December 2008	(Sweden) Östersund	20 km individual	Biathlon World Cup
2008–09; 2 victories (1 In, 1 Sp)	19 March 2009	(Norway) Trondheim	10 km sprint	Biathlon World Cup

*Results are from UIPMB and IBU races which include the Biathlon World Cup, Biathlon World Championships and the Winter Olympic Games.

== See also ==
- List of multiple Olympic gold medalists in one event

Awards
Preceded by (Germany) Ronny Ackermann	German Sportsman of the Year; 2006	Succeeded by (Germany) Fabian Hambüchen
