= Biathlon Junior World Championships 1998 =

Biathlon event in the United States and Canada

The 1998 Biathlon Junior World Championships was held in Jericho, Vermont, USA and Valcartier, Canada from February 22 to March 1, 1998. There was to be a total of 8 competitions: sprint, individual, team and relay races for men and women.

== Medal winners ==
=== Junior Women ===
Event:	Gold:	Time	Silver:	Time	Bronze:	Time
Individual details	Simone Denkinger; Germany	38:56.8 (1+1+0)	Michela Ponza; Italy	41:16.2 (0+1+0)	Olga Zaitseva; Russia	41:47.1 (0+3+1)
Sprint details	Gro Marit Istad Kristiansen; Norway	28:39.9 (2+0)	Linda Tjørhom; Norway	28:54.1 (0+0)	Martina Glagow; Germany	29:05.0 (0+0)
Relay	Germany; Nicole Nordhaus; Simone Denkinger; Martina Glagow		Norway; Liv Kjersti Eikeland; Linda Tjørhom; Gro Marit Istad Kristiansen		Italy; Barbara Kostner; Michela Ponza; Claudia Messelod	
Team	Russia; Olga Zaitseva; Larissa Pitatileva; Anna Bogaliy; Natalia Geleveria		Germany; Sabine Flatscher; Miriam Bauer; Nicole Nordhaus; Martina Glagow		Czech Republic; Radka Doskocilova; Lenka Faltusová; Denisa Pelikánová; Jana Pesková	

=== Junior Men ===
Event:	Gold:	Time	Silver:	Time	Bronze:	Time
Individual details	Jörn Wollschlaeger; Germany	48:15.2 (1+0+1)	Mike Muth; Germany	49:40.2 (0+0+2)	Andrei Prokunin; Russia	49:45.0 (1+3+0)
Sprint details	Andrei Prokunin; Russia	32:20.4 (0+0)	Jörn Wollschlaeger; Germany	32:34.7 (1+0)	Syver Berg-Domaas; Norway	32:52.2 (2+0)
Relay	Germany; Mike Muth; Jörn Wollschlaeger; Björn Sterzing; Alexander Wolf		Russia; Alexei Boltenko; Oleksiy Korobeinikov; Dimitri Babich; Andrei Prokunin		Norway; Jon Kristian Svaland; Rune Morten Johansen; Syver Berg-Domaas; Hans Proesch	
Team	Norway; Syver Berg-Domaas; Hans Proesch; Rune Morten Johansen; Jon Kristian Svaland		Germany; Björn Sterzing; Fabian Mund; Alexander Wolf; Jörn Wollschlaeger		Italy; Patrick Oberegger; Patrick Rabanser; Alexander Inderst; Ivan Romanin	

== Medal table ==
Rank	Nation	Gold	Silver	Bronze	Total
1	Germany (GER)	4	4	1	9
2	Norway (NOR)	2	2	3	7
3	Russia (RUS)	2	1	2	5
4	Italy (ITA)	0	1	2	3
Totals (4 entries)		8	8	8	24
