= Tomasz Sikora =

Polish biathlete

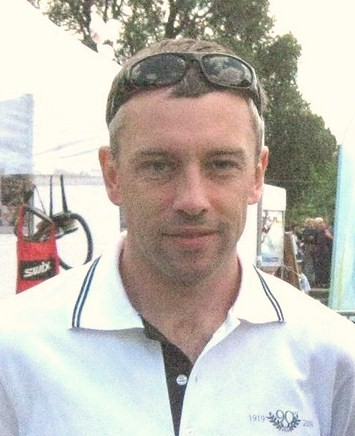

Personal information
- Full name: Tomasz Wacław Sikora
- Born: 21 December 1973 (age 52) Wodzisław Śląski, Poland
- Height: 1.82 m (6 ft 0 in)

Sport

Professional information
- Sport: Biathlon
- Club: AZS AWF Katowice
- Skis: Fischer
- World Cup debut: 4 March 1993

Olympic Games
- Teams: 5 (1994, 1998, 2002, 2006, 2010)
- Medals: 1 (0 gold)

World Championships
- Teams: 16 (1995, 1996, 1997, 1998, 1999, 2000, 2001, 2002, 2003, 2004, 2005, 2006, 2007, 2008, 2009, 2012)
- Medals: 3 (1 gold)

World Cup
- Seasons: 20 (1992/93–2011/12)
- Individual victories: 5
- All victories: 5
- Individual podiums: 23
- All podiums: 24
- Discipline titles: 1: 1 Sprint (2005–06)
Medal record
Men's biathlon
Representing Poland
Event	1st	2nd	3rd
Olympic Games	0	1	0
World Championships	1	1	1
European Championships	6	5	2
Total	7	7	3
Olympic Games
Silver medal – second place	2006 Turin	15 km mass start
World Championships
Gold medal – first place	1995 Antholz-Anterselva	20 km individual
Silver medal – second place	2004 Oberhof	20 km individual
Bronze medal – third place	1997 Brezno-Osrblie	Team event
European Championships
Gold medal – first place	2000 Zakopane	12.5 km pursuit
Gold medal – first place	2004 Minsk	20 km individual
Gold medal – first place	2004 Minsk	12.5 km pursuit
Gold medal – first place	2007 Bansko	10 km sprint
Gold medal – first place	2007 Bansko	12.5 km pursuit
Gold medal – first place	2008 Nové Město	20 km individual
Silver medal – second place	1997 Windischgarsten	20 km individual
Silver medal – second place	2000 Zakopane	4 × 7.5 km relay
Silver medal – second place	2001 Houte Marienne	4 × 7.5 km relay
Silver medal – second place	2002 Kontiolahti	20 km individual
Silver medal – second place	2004 Minsk	10 km sprint
Bronze medal – third place	2002 Kontiolahti	10 km sprint
Bronze medal – third place	2004 Minsk	4 × 7.5 km relay

Tomasz Sikora (born 21 December 1973) is a former Polish biathlete.

== Life and career ==
Sikora was born in Wodzisław Śląski. In 1993, he finished second in 10 km sprint at the Junior World Championships in Ruhpolding. He was world champion in 1995 (20 km), runner-up in the world championships in 2004 (also 20 km) and bronze medalist in 1997 (team competition). On 25 February 2006 he was placed second in the 15 km mass start at the 2006 Winter Olympics in Turin, winning the second and final medal for Poland in those Olympics.

On 23 March 2006 Sikora won the IBU World Cup sprint title, beating Ole Einar Bjørndalen by 5 points. On January 10, 2009, he took the lead in the overall world cup classification, which he lost 42 days later. At last he was 2nd in overall IBU World Cup 2009 and 2nd in IBU World Cup 2009 sprint. He was chosen the best biathlete 2009, in voting of national team coaches. In 2010 he won the fans' award.

Sikora retired after the 2011–12 season.

== Biathlon results ==
All results are sourced from the International Biathlon Union.

=== Olympic Games ===
1 medal (1 silver)

Event	Individual	Sprint	Pursuit	Mass start	Relay
(Norway) 1994 Lillehammer	—	32nd	—N/a	—N/a	8th
(Japan) 1998 Nagano	47th	28th	—N/a	—N/a	5th
(United States) 2002 Salt Lake City	46th	31st	25th	—N/a	9th
(Italy) 2006 Turin	21st	19th	18th	Silver	13th
(Canada) 2010 Vancouver	7th	29th	18th	11th	—

*Pursuit was added as an event in 2002, with mass start being added in 2006.

=== World Championships ===
3 medals (1 gold, 1 silver, 1 bronze)

Event	Individual	Sprint	Pursuit	Mass start	Team	Relay	Mixed relay
(Italy) 1995 Antholz-Anterselva	Gold	29th	—N/a	—N/a	18th	7th	—N/a
(Germany) 1996 Ruhpolding	6th	15th	—N/a	—N/a	9th	7th	—N/a
(Slovakia) 1997 Brezno-Osrblie	28th	17th	21st	—N/a	Bronze	6th	—N/a
(Slovenia) 1998 Pokljuka	—N/a	—N/a	14th	—N/a	5th	—N/a	—N/a
(Finland) 1999 Kontiolahti	14th	59th	—	—	—N/a	14th	—N/a
(Norway) 2000 Oslo Holmenkollen	32nd	21st	47th	18th	—N/a	11th	—N/a
(Slovenia) 2001 Pokljuka	18th	15th	16th	20th	—N/a	6th	—N/a
(Norway) 2002 Oslo Holmenkollen	—N/a	—N/a	—N/a	25th	—N/a	—N/a	—N/a
(Russia) 2003 Khanty-Mansiysk	9th	11th	7th	14th	—N/a	—	—N/a
(Germany) 2004 Oberhof	Silver	17th	6th	4th	—N/a	11th	—N/a
(Austria) 2005 Hochfilzen	5th	9th	10th	5th	—N/a	8th	8th
(Slovenia) 2006 Pokljuka	—N/a	—N/a	—N/a	—N/a	—N/a	—N/a	8th
(Italy) 2007 Antholz-Anterselva	21st	5th	7th	21st	—N/a	13th	11th
(Sweden) 2008 Östersund	30th	11th	11th	21st	—N/a	17th	6th
(South Korea) 2009 Pyeongchang	9th	16th	4th	6th	—N/a	13th	8th
(Germany) 2012 Ruhpolding	37th	54th	51st	—	—N/a	LPD	13th

*During Olympic seasons competitions are only held for those events not included in the Olympic program.
**Team was removed as an event in 1998, and pursuit was added in 1997 with mass start being added in 1999 and the mixed relay in 2005.

=== Individual victories ===
5 victories (1 In, 1 Sp, 1 Pu, 2 MS)

Season	Date	Location	Discipline	Level
1994–95; 1 victory (1 In)	16 February 1995	(Italy) Antholz-Anterselva	20 km individual	Biathlon World Championships
2005–06; 1 victory (1 MS)	19 March 2006	(Finland) Kontiolahti	15 km mass start	Biathlon World Cup
2007–08; 2 victories (1 Sp, 1 MS)	5 January 2008	(Germany) Oberhof	10 km sprint	Biathlon World Cup
2007–08; 2 victories (1 Sp, 1 MS)	9 March 2008	(Russia) Khanty-Mansiysk	15 km mass start	Biathlon World Cup
2008–09; 1 victory (1 MS)	7 December 2008	(Sweden) Östersund	12.5 km pursuit	Biathlon World Cup

*Results are from UIPMB and IBU races which include the Biathlon World Cup, Biathlon World Championships and the Winter Olympic Games.

== See also ==
- List of athletes with the most appearances at Olympic Games

Olympic Games
Preceded by Henryk Gruth	Flagbearer for Poland; Lillehammer 1994	Succeeded by Mariusz Siudek
