= Biathlon World Championships 2007 – Mixed relay =

Below are the 2007 Biathlon World Championships mixed relay results held in Antholz, Italy on 8 February 2007.

== Results ==
Rank	Nation	P	S	T	Result	Behind
1	Sweden (SWE)	0+6	0+7	0+13	1:20:04.7	0
2	France (FRA)	0+1	0+1	0+2	1:20:32.3	+27.6
3	Norway (NOR)	0+5	0+6	0+11	1:20:41.1	+36.4
4	Slovenia (SLO)	0+2	2+9	2+11	1:21:15.8	+1:11.1
5	Germany (GER)	3+9	0+3	3+12	1:21:28.9	+1:24.2
6	Italy (ITA)	0+6	0+5	0+11	1:21:30.0	+1:25.3
7	China (CHN)	0+1	1+7	1+8	1:21:44.0	+1:39.3
8	Czech Republic (CZE)	0+4	0+6	0+10	1:21:53.2	+1:48.5
9	Russia (RUS)	0+6	0+5	0+11	1:22:22.7	+2:18.0
10	Ukraine (UKR)	0+5	0+5	0+10	1:22:32.5	+2:27.8
11	Poland (POL)	0+5	0+5	0+10	1:23:29.1	+3:24.4
12	Estonia (EST)	0+2	1+8	1+10	1:23:44.2	+3:39.5
13	Belarus (BLR)	0+3	2+5	2+8	1:23:50.2	+3:45.5
14	Canada (CAN)	0+0	1+10	1+10	1:24:58.9	+4:54.2
15	Slovakia (SVK)	0+7	1+10	1+17	1:26:23.3	+6:18.6
16	Finland (FIN)	1+8	0+4	1+12	1:26:56.6	+6:51.9
17	Latvia (LAT)	0+3	6+9	6+12	1:27:31.1	+7:26.4
18	Bulgaria (BUL)	1+8	3+8	4+16	1:28:15.4	+8:10.7
19	Kazakhstan (KAZ)	0+4	2+9	2+13	1:28:19.4	+8:14.7
20	Japan (JPN)	2+10	2+9	4+19	1:33:34.4	+13:29.7
21	Belgium (BEL)	0+3	2+8	2+11	1:34:17.2	+14:12.5
-	United States (USA)	-	-	-	DNS	-
