= Gro Marit Istad Kristiansen =

Norwegian biathlete (born 1978)

Personal information
- Born: 9 February 1978 (age 48)

Sport
Medal record
Women's biathlon
Representing Norway
World Championships
Gold medal – first place	2004 Oberhof	4 × 6 km relay
Gold medal – first place	2005 Hochfilzen	Mass start 12.5 km
Junior World Championships
Gold medal – first place	1997 Forni Avoltri	3 × 7.5 km relay
Gold medal – first place	1998 Jericho/Valcartier	Sprint
Silver medal – second place	1998 Jericho/Valcartier	Relay

Gro Marit Istad Kristiansen (born 9 February 1978) is a retired Norwegian biathlete from Voss Municipality. She has been on the Norwegian elite team since 1998. In 1998 she became junior world champion in the sprint event, and she won her first triumph as a senior at the 2005 World Championships where she won the 12.5 km mass start.
