= Sven Fischer =

German biathlete (born 1971)

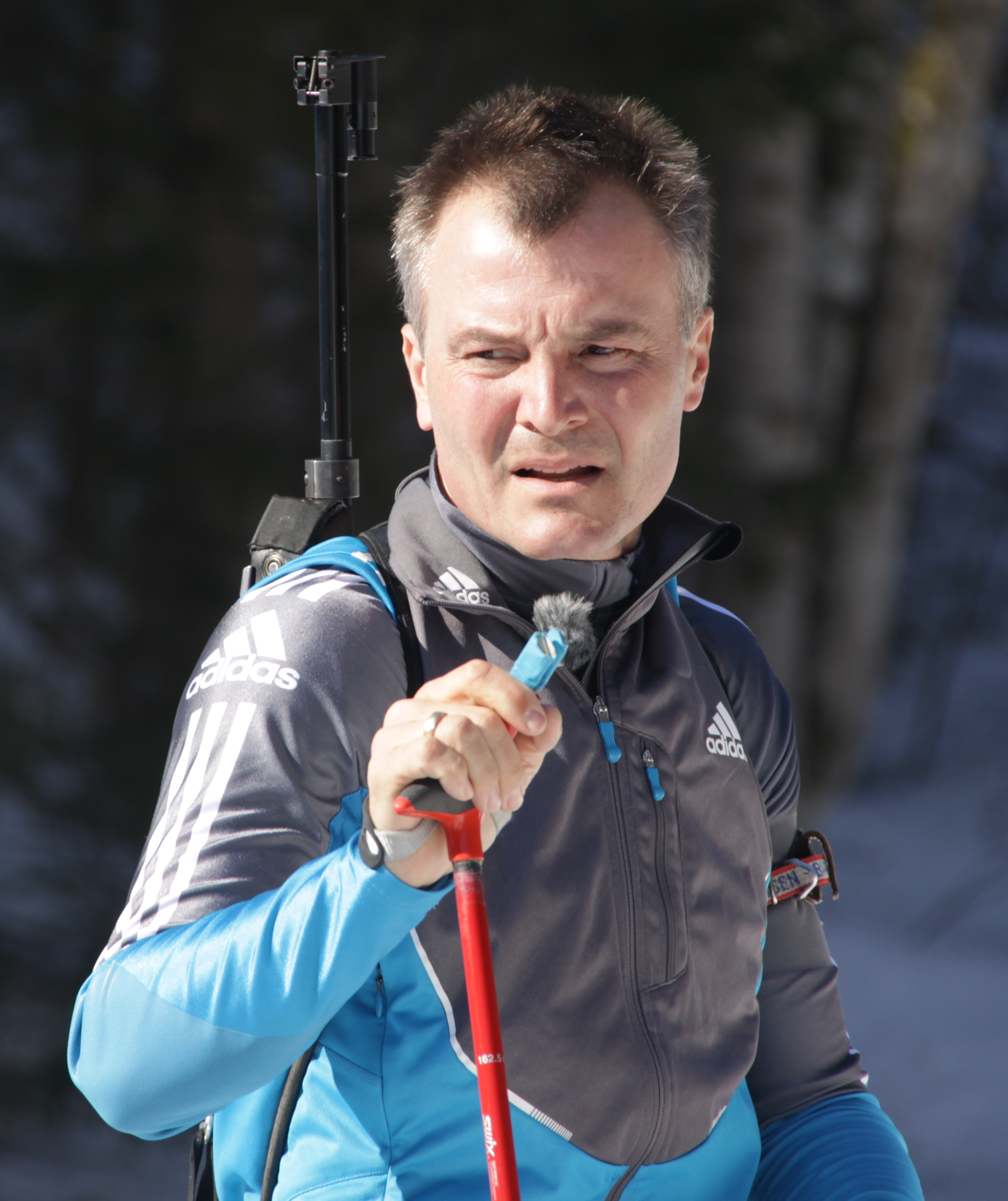
- Fischer in Ruhpolding, Germany, in 2012.

Personal information
- Full name: Sven Fischer
- Born: 16 April 1971 (age 55) Schmalkalden, Thuringia, East Germany
- Height: 1.85 m (6 ft 1 in)
- Weight: 82 kg (181 lb)

Sport

Professional information
- Sport: Biathlon
- Club: WSV Oberhof 05
- World Cup debut: 17 December 1992
- Retired: 18 March 2007

Olympic Games
- Teams: 4 (1994, 1998, 2002, 2006)
- Medals: 8 (4 gold)

World Championships
- Teams: 14 (1993, 1995, 1996, 1997, 1998, 1999, 2000, 2001, 2002, 2003, 2004, 2005, 2006, 2007)
- Medals: 20 (7 gold)

World Cup
- Seasons: 15 (1992–93 – 2006–07)
- Individual races: 294
- All races: 371
- Individual victories: 33
- All victories: 59
- Individual podiums: 90
- All podiums: 150
- Overall titles: 2 (1996–97, 1998–99)
- Discipline titles: 8: 4 Sprint (1992–93, 1993–94, 1998–99, 2001–02); 2 Pursuit (1997–98, 2004–05); 2 Mass start (1998–99, 2000–01)
Medal record
Men's biathlon
Representing Germany
Olympic Games
Gold medal – first place	1994 Lillehammer	4 × 7.5 km relay
Gold medal – first place	1998 Nagano	4 × 7.5 km relay
Gold medal – first place	2006 Turin	10 km sprint
Gold medal – first place	2006 Turin	4 × 7.5 km relay
Silver medal – second place	2002 Salt Lake City	10 km sprint
Silver medal – second place	2002 Salt Lake City	4 × 7.5 km relay
Bronze medal – third place	1994 Lillehammer	20 km individual
Bronze medal – third place	2006 Turin	12.5 km pursuit
World Championships
Gold medal – first place	1993 Borovets	Team event
Gold medal – first place	1995 Antholz-Anterselva	4 × 7.5 km relay
Gold medal – first place	1997 Brezno-Osrblie	4 × 7.5 km relay
Gold medal – first place	1999 Oslo	20 km individual
Gold medal – first place	1999 Oslo	15 km mass start
Gold medal – first place	2003 Khanty-Mansiysk	4 × 7.5 km relay
Gold medal – first place	2004 Oberhof	4 × 7.5 km relay
Silver medal – second place	1996 Ruhpolding	4 × 7.5 km relay
Silver medal – second place	1998 Hochfilzen	Team event
Silver medal – second place	2002 Oslo	15 km mass start
Silver medal – second place	2003 Khanty-Mansiysk	15 km mass start
Silver medal – second place	2005 Hochfilzen	10 km sprint
Silver medal – second place	2005 Hochfilzen	15 km mass start
Bronze medal – third place	1993 Borovets	4 × 7.5 km relay
Bronze medal – third place	1999 Kontiolahti	12.5 km pursuit
Bronze medal – third place	2000 Lahti	4 × 7.5 km relay
Bronze medal – third place	2001 Pokljuka	12.5 km pursuit
Bronze medal – third place	2001 Pokljuka	15 km mass start
Bronze medal – third place	2005 Hochfilzen	12.5 km pursuit
Bronze medal – third place	2007 Antholz-Anterselva	4 × 7.5 km relay

Sven Fischer (born 16 April 1971) is a German former biathlete. He trained with the WSV Oberhof 05 club, and was coached by Frank Ullrich and Fritz Fischer (national coaches) and Klaus Siebert (club coach). After the 2006/07 biathlon season, he retired. Fischer also won the overall World Cup twice, in 1997 and 1999, as well as eight season World Cups in various disciplines.

== Background ==
Fischer, who stands at 1.85 m (6 ft 1 in) and weighs 85 kg (187 lb), was born in Schmalkalden, Thuringia (former East Germany). His apparent talents for athletics was discovered early and already in third grade he was training three times a week in the BSG Werkzeugkombinat sports club. In the fifth grade, he became district champion of his age class.

In September 1983, the boarding school Kinder- und Jugendsportschule (KJS) accepted him on a biathlon youth scholarship. After his exam in 1989, he joined the army studying to become a sports teacher. The German reunification and the fall of the Berlin Wall and subsequent unification of the East and West German armies, forced him to leave the military in 1990.

He instead started training for international sport events, but in 1989, when Fischer was eighteen, he had problems with both his kneecaps after a growth spurt as a youth. As a result he sat out the whole of the 1989 season and thought he might have to retire from the sport at his young age. However, in the 1990 season when he came back he found that he had become more powerful than before his injury, and in December 1990, he celebrated his first European cup victory in sprint in Hochfilzen. One week later he participated in his first world cup relay. He was soon rewarded B–status and because of success in the German Championship in 1992 he qualified for the world cup in Pokljuka in December 1992.

In 1993, he won a World Championship gold medal in the 10 km Team in Borovets, Bulgaria, and a world cup race, in sprint, in Kontiolahti, Finland. In 1994, he won the Olympic bronze medal in the 20 km individual.

Fischer was an integral part of the German biathlon team until his retirement.

Fischer has eight biathlon victories at the Holmenkollen ski festival, three in individual (1995, 1999, 2004), two in sprint (1995, 1999), two in pursuit (2002, 2004), and one in mass start (2001).

== Career ==
Fischer won the World Cup overall on two occasions (1996/97 and 1998/99), he's also come second twice (1993/94 and 2004/05), and third three times (1995/96, 1997/98, and 1999/2000). In the 2004/05 season Fischer lost the World Cup by only eleven points, which he most probably would have earned had he competed in the final race of the year, but he missed it because of a cold.

In the Olympics, Fischer won four gold medals, one of them in the sprint in 2006 Winter Olympics, and the other three in the relay (1994, 1998, and 2006). He also won two silver, and two bronze.

In the World Championships, Fischer amassed seven gold medals, six silver, and seven bronze. Four of his gold medals were won in relays, one in the team event, one in the individual, and one in the mass start. In the sprint he has one of his silver medals (Hochfilzen 2005). He has three bronze from the pursuit (Kontiolahti 1999, Pokljuka 2001, and Hochfilzen 2005). In the mass start he has one gold (Oslo Holmenkollen 1999), two silver (Khanty-Mansiysk 2003 and Hochfilzen 2005), and one bronze (Pokljuka 2001). His remaining silver and two bronze came in the relay (silver in Ruhpolding 1996, bronzes in Borovets 1993 and Lahti 2000).

== Biathlon results ==
All results are sourced from the International Biathlon Union.

=== Olympic Games ===
8 medals (4 gold, 2 silver, 2 bronze)

Event	Individual	Sprint	Pursuit	Mass start	Relay
(Norway) 1994 Lillehammer	Bronze	7th	—N/a	—N/a	Gold
(Japan) 1998 Nagano	16th	29th	—N/a	—N/a	Gold
(United States) 2002 Salt Lake City	29th	Silver	12th	—N/a	Silver
(Italy) 2006 Turin	17th	Gold	Bronze	17th	Gold

*Pursuit was added as an event in 2002, with mass start being added in 2006.

=== World Championships ===
20 medals (7 gold, 6 silver, 7 bronze)

Event	Individual	Sprint	Pursuit	Mass start	Team	Relay	Mixed relay
(Bulgaria) 1993 Borovets	DNS	20th	—N/a	—N/a	Gold	Bronze	—N/a
(Italy) 1995 Antholz-Anterselva	DNS	26th	—N/a	—N/a	14th	Gold	—N/a
(Germany) 1996 Ruhpolding	22nd	19th	—N/a	—N/a	6th	Silver	—N/a
(Slovakia) 1997 Brezno-Osrblie	5th	24th	23rd	—N/a	—	Gold	—N/a
(Slovenia) 1998 Pokljuka	—N/a	—N/a	4th	—N/a	Silver	—N/a	—N/a
(Finland) 1999 Kontiolahti	Gold	7th	Bronze	Gold	—N/a	4th	—N/a
(Norway) 2000 Oslo Holmenkollen	19th	40th	13th	13th	—N/a	Bronze	—N/a
(Slovenia) 2001 Pokljuka	11th	5th	Bronze	Bronze	—N/a	12th	—N/a
(Norway) 2002 Oslo Holmenkollen	—N/a	—N/a	—N/a	Silver	—N/a	—N/a	—N/a
(Russia) 2003 Khanty-Mansiysk	22nd	12th	11th	Silver	—N/a	Gold	—N/a
(Germany) 2004 Oberhof	16th	8th	23rd	11th	—N/a	Gold	—N/a
(Austria) 2005 Hochfilzen	4th	Silver	Bronze	Silver	—N/a	6th	—
(Slovenia) 2006 Pokljuka	—N/a	—N/a	—N/a	—N/a	—N/a	—N/a	10th
(Italy) 2007 Antholz-Anterselva	20th	43rd	17th	5th	—N/a	Bronze	—

*During Olympic seasons competitions are only held for those events not included in the Olympic program.
**Team was removed as an event in 1998, and pursuit was added in 1997 with mass start being added in 1999 and the mixed relay in 2005.

=== Individual victories ===
33 victories (6 In, 13 Sp, 10 Pu, 4 MS)

Season	Date	Location	Discipline	Level
1992–93; 1 victory (1 Sp)	20 March 1993	(Finland) Kontiolahti	10 km sprint	Biathlon World Cup
1993–94; 2 victories (1 In, 1 Sp)	20 January 1994	(Italy) Antholz-Anterselva	20 km individual	Biathlon World Cup
1993–94; 2 victories (1 In, 1 Sp)	12 March 1994	(Canada) Hinton	10 km sprint	Biathlon World Cup
1995–96; 2 victories (1 In, 1 Sp)	14 December 1995	(Norway) Oslo Holmenkollen	20 km individual	Biathlon World Cup
1995–96; 2 victories (1 In, 1 Sp)	16 December 1995	(Norway) Oslo Holmenkollen	10 km sprint	Biathlon World Cup
1996–97; 3 victories (2 Sp, 1 Pu)	30 November 1996	(Norway) Lillehammer	10 km sprint	Biathlon World Cup
1996–97; 3 victories (2 Sp, 1 Pu)	1 December 1996	(Norway) Lillehammer	12.5 km pursuit	Biathlon World Cup
1996–97; 3 victories (2 Sp, 1 Pu)	8 March 1997	(Japan) Nagano	10 km sprint	Biathlon World Cup
1997–98; 1 victory (1 Pu)	20 December 1997	(Finland) Kontiolahti	12.5 km pursuit	Biathlon World Cup
1998–99; 6 victories (1 In, 3 Sp, 1 Pu, 1 MS)	19 December 1998	(Slovakia) Brezno-Osrblie	10 km sprint	Biathlon World Cup
1998–99; 6 victories (1 In, 3 Sp, 1 Pu, 1 MS)	20 December 1998	(Slovakia) Brezno-Osrblie	12.5 km pursuit	Biathlon World Cup
1998–99; 6 victories (1 In, 3 Sp, 1 Pu, 1 MS)	26 February 1999	(United States) Lake Placid	10 km sprint	Biathlon World Cup
1998–99; 6 victories (1 In, 3 Sp, 1 Pu, 1 MS)	11 March 1999	(Norway) Oslo Holmenkollen	20 km individual	Biathlon World Championships
1998–99; 6 victories (1 In, 3 Sp, 1 Pu, 1 MS)	12 March 1999	(Norway) Oslo Holmenkollen	10 km sprint	Biathlon World Cup
1998–99; 6 victories (1 In, 3 Sp, 1 Pu, 1 MS)	13 March 1999	(Norway) Oslo Holmenkollen	15 km mass start	Biathlon World Championships
1999–2000; 2 victories (2 Pu)	12 March 2000	(Finland) Lahti	12.5 km pursuit	Biathlon World Cup
1999–2000; 2 victories (2 Pu)	18 March 2000	(Russia) Khanty-Mansiysk	12.5 km pursuit	Biathlon World Cup
2000–01; 2 victories (2 MS)	7 January 2001	(Germany) Oberhof	15 km mass start	Biathlon World Cup
2000–01; 2 victories (2 MS)	18 March 2001	(Norway) Oslo Holmenkollen	15 km mass start	Biathlon World Cup
2001–02; 3 victories (1 Sp, 2 Pu)	20 January 2002	(Germany) Ruhpolding	12.5 km pursuit	Biathlon World Cup
2001–02; 3 victories (1 Sp, 2 Pu)	9 March 2002	(Sweden) Östersund	10 km sprint	Biathlon World Cup
2001–02; 3 victories (1 Sp, 2 Pu)	23 March 2002	(Norway) Oslo Holmenkollen	12.5 km pursuit	Biathlon World Cup
2002–03; 1 victory (1 Sp)	20 February 2003	(Sweden) Östersund	10 km sprint	Biathlon World Cup
2003–04; 2 victories (1 In, 1 MS)	22 January 2004	(Italy) Antholz-Anterselva	20 km individual	Biathlon World Cup
2003–04; 2 victories (1 In, 1 MS)	6 March 2004	(United States) Fort Kent	15 km mass start	Biathlon World Cup
2004–05; 5 victories (1 In, 2 Sp, 2 Pu)	4 December 2004	(Norway) Beitostølen	12.5 km pursuit	Biathlon World Cup
2004–05; 5 victories (1 In, 2 Sp, 2 Pu)	9 December 2004	(Norway) Oslo Holmenkollen	20 km individual	Biathlon World Cup
2004–05; 5 victories (1 In, 2 Sp, 2 Pu)	12 December 2004	(Norway) Oslo Holmenkollen	12.5 km pursuit	Biathlon World Cup
2004–05; 5 victories (1 In, 2 Sp, 2 Pu)	7 January 2005	(Germany) Oberhof	10 km sprint	Biathlon World Cup
2004–05; 5 victories (1 In, 2 Sp, 2 Pu)	16 March 2005	(Russia) Khanty-Mansiysk	10 km sprint	Biathlon World Cup
2005–06; 3 victories (1 In, 1 Sp, 1 Pu)	15 December 2005	(Slovakia) Brezno-Osrblie	20 km individual	Biathlon World Cup
2005–06; 3 victories (1 In, 1 Sp, 1 Pu)	18 December 2005	(Slovakia) Brezno-Osrblie	12.5 km pursuit	Biathlon World Cup
2005–06; 3 victories (1 In, 1 Sp, 1 Pu)	14 February 2006	(Italy) Turin	10 km sprint	Winter Olympic Games

*Results are from UIPMB and IBU races which include the Biathlon World Cup, Biathlon World Championships and the Winter Olympic Games.

== See also ==
- List of multiple Olympic gold medalists
