= Martina Beck =

German biathlete

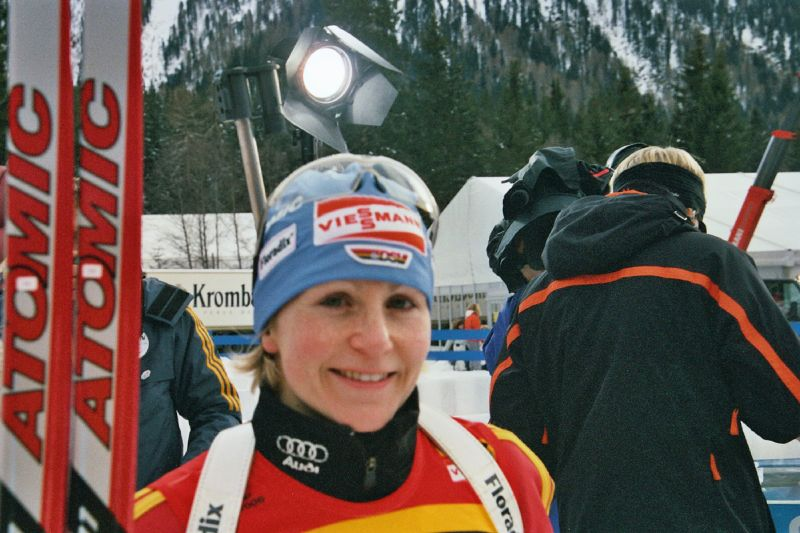
- Martina Beck in Antholz (2006)

Medal record

Women's biathlon

Representing Germany

Olympic Games
Silver medal – second place	2006 Turin	15 km individual
Silver medal – second place	2006 Turin	10 km pursuit
Silver medal – second place	2006 Turin	4 × 6 km relay
Bronze medal – third place	2010 Vancouver	4 × 6 km relay

World Championships
Gold medal – first place	2003 Khanty-Mansiysk	10 km pursuit
Gold medal – first place	2007 Antholz-Anterselva	4 × 6 km relay
Gold medal – first place	2008 Östersund	4 × 6 km relay
Silver medal – second place	2001 Pokljuka	12.5 km mass start
Silver medal – second place	2004 Oberhof	10 km pursuit
Silver medal – second place	2007 Antholz-Anterselva	12.5 km mass start
Silver medal – second place	2008 Östersund	15 km individual
Silver medal – second place	2009 Pyeongchang	4 × 6 km relay
Bronze medal – third place	2003 Khanty-Mansiysk	4 × 6 km relay
Bronze medal – third place	2004 Oberhof	7.5 km sprint
Bronze medal – third place	2004 Oberhof	4 × 6 km relay
Bronze medal – third place	2007 Antholz-Anterselva	15 km individual

Junior World Championships
Gold medal – first place	1998 Jericho/Valcartier	Relay
Gold medal – first place	1999 Pokljuka	7.5 km sprint
Gold medal – first place	1999 Pokljuka	10 km pursuit
Gold medal – first place	1999 Pokljuka	3 × 7.5 km relay
Silver medal – second place	1997 Forni Avoltri	7.5 km sprint
Silver medal – second place	1997 Forni Avoltri	3 × 7.5 km relay
Silver medal – second place	1998 Jericho/Valcartier	Team
Bronze medal – third place	1997 Forni Avoltri	7.5 km team
Bronze medal – third place	1998 Jericho/Valcartier	Sprint

Martina "Molly" Beck (née Glagow; 21 September 1979 in Garmisch-Partenkirchen, West Germany) is a retired German biathlete. She now lives in Mittenwald in Bavaria. She was most successful in the 2002–03 season, when she was the first German to win the women's overall Biathlon World Cup. She is also a three-times world champion and three-times Olympic silver medalist.

She married the Austrian biathlete Günther Beck on 24 July 2008 and is now known as Martina Beck. She has one daughter named Hilde (born 1 April 2011).

== Career ==
Beck's father, Martin Glagow, is a former army officer and ski technician: he waxed Martina's skis until the end of the 2004–05 season, and was also a wax technician for the British biathlon team from 2000 until his retirement in 2011. Although Beck stands only 1.58 m (5 ft 2 in) tall, she was a strong skier, but was renowned for her shooting ability: she was regularly among the female athletes with the highest accuracy rate, leading the shooting statistics in the 2003–04 season with a rate of 89 percent. Her father attributed her shooting ability to family inheritance: he had won multiple divisional shooting championships, and he noted that his father was also a good marksman.

She became a member of the German World Cup team in 2000, when she impressed by winning an event in her first year and even finished third in the mass start World Cup standings. Later, she became the first German biathlete to win the women's Biathlon World Cup in the 2002–03 season, alongside the pursuit World Cup; in 2005–06, she finished third in the overall standings and won the mass start standings. In 2007–08, she was the best biathlete in the individual discipline. As of 17 March 2008, she has won a total of 12 individual world cup events.

During the 2006 Winter Olympics in Turin, Beck won three silver medals: one in the sprint competition, one in the pursuit, and one in the relay. At world championships, she has won a total of eleven medals: she was World Champion thrice, in 2003 in the pursuit (together with Sandrine Bailly) and in 2007 and 2008 in the relay.

Beck retired from the sport after the 2009–10 season.

== Achievements ==
- Winter Olympics:
  - 2006: 3 × Silver (Individual, Pursuit, Relay)
  - 2010: 1 × Bronze (Relay)
- Biathlon World Championships:
  - 2001: 1 × silver (mass start)
  - 2003: 1 × gold (pursuit), 1 × bronze (relay)
  - 2004: 1 × silver (pursuit), 2 × bronze (sprint, relay)
  - 2007: 1 × gold (relay), 1 × silver (mass start), 1 × bronze (individual)
  - 2008: 1 × gold (relay), 1 × silver (individual)
- Biathlon World Cup overall:
  - 1 × overall World Cup winner (2002/03), 1 × World Cup pursuit winner (2002/03), 1 × World Cup individual winner (2007/08)
- Biathlon World Cup victories:
  - 14 (as of: 7 December 2008)
- Holmenkollen ski festival victories
  - Three (as of 2006) - 2003 (pursuit), 2004 (individual), and 2006 (sprint)
