= Biathlon World Championships 2005 =

40th edition of the Biathlon World Championships

- Host city: Hochfilzen
- Country: Austria
- Events: 8
- Opening: 4 March 2005
- Closing: 13 March 2005

The 40th Biathlon World Championships were held in 2005 for the third time in Hochfilzen, Austria from 4 to 13 March. Approximately 80,000 spectators went to see the competitions. The mixed relay, contested for the first time in the World Championships, was held in Khanty-Mansiysk, Russia.

== Schedule ==
Date	Time	Event
5 March	10:00	Men's 10 km sprint
5 March	14:00	Women's 7.5 km sprint
6 March	10:00	Men's 12.5 km pursuit
6 March	13:00	Women's 10 km pursuit
8 March	14:15	Women's 15 km individual
9 March	14:15	Men's 20 km individual
11 March	14:15	Women's 4 × 6 km relay
12 March	14:45	Men's 4 × 7.5 km relay
13 March	10:45	Women's 12.5 km mass start
13 March	12:45	Men's 15 km mass start
20 March	13:00	Mixed 4 × 6 km relay

== Medal winners ==
=== Men ===
Event	Gold		Silver		Bronze	
10 km sprint	Ole Einar Bjørndalen; Norway	24:37.5 (1+0)	Sven Fischer; Germany	24:48.0 (1+0)	Ilmārs Bricis; Latvia	25:01.5 (0+0)
12.5 km pursuit	Ole Einar Bjørndalen; Norway	36:41.4 (0+1+1+1)	Sergei Tchepikov; Russia	37:20.6 (0+0+0+0)	Sven Fischer; Germany	37:32.1 (2+0+1+0)
20 km individual	Roman Dostál; Czech Republic	1:00:24.5 (0+0+0+1)	Michael Greis; Germany	1:00:33.9 (0+0+0+0)	Ricco Groß; Germany	1:00:51.4 (1+0+0+1)
4 × 7.5 km relay	Norway Halvard Hanevold; Stian Eckhoff; Egil Gjelland; Ole Einar Bjørndalen	1:21:59.2 (0+2) (0+3) (0+0) (0+1) (0+1) (0+0) (0+0) (0+0)	Russia Sergei Rozhkov; Nikolay Kruglov, Jr. Pavel Rostovtsev; Sergei Tchepikov	1:22:25.2 (0+0) (0+0) (0+0) (0+1) (0+1) (0+0) (0+2) (0+1)	Austria Daniel Mesotitsch; Friedrich Pinter; Wolfgang Rottmann; Christoph Sumann	1:22:42.5 (0+0) (0+2) (0+0) (0+0) (0+0) (0+1) (0+0) (0+1)
15 km mass start	Ole Einar Bjørndalen; Norway	40:51.9 (1+0+2+0)	Sven Fischer; Germany	41:03.8 (0+1+1+1)	Raphaël Poirée; France	41:12.5 (0+0+1+1)

=== Women ===
Event	Gold		Silver		Bronze	
7.5 km sprint	Uschi Disl; Germany	21:58.6 (0+0)	Olga Zaitseva; Russia	22:02.1 (0+0)	Olena Zubrilova; Belarus	22:25.2 (0+0)
10 km pursuit	Uschi Disl; Germany	33:32.5 (1+0+2+1)	Liu Xianying; China	33:50.4 (0+1+1+2)	Olga Zaitseva; Russia	34:13.1 (0+1+1+2)
15 km individual	Andrea Henkel; Germany	52:37.5 (0+1+0+0)	Sun Riboun; China	53:07.7 (0+1+0+1)	Linda Tjørhom; Norway	53:11.8 (1+0+0+0)
4 × 6 km relay	Russia Olga Pyleva; Svetlana Ishmouratova; Anna Bogaliy-Titovets; Olga Zaitseva	1:13:44.4 (0+1) (0+0) (0+2) (0+1) (0+0) (0+0) (0+3) (0+0)	Germany Uschi Disl; Katrin Apel; Andrea Henkel; Kati Wilhelm	1:14:25.8 (0+3) (1+3) (0+2) (0+0) (0+1) (0+0) (0+2) (0+1)	Belarus Ekaterina Ivanova; Olga Nazarova; Lyudmila Ananko; Olena Zubrylava	1:14:37.6 (0+0) (1+3) (0+0) (0+2) (0+0) (0+1) (0+0) (0+3)
12.5 km mass start	Gro Marit Istad Kristiansen; Norway	41:40.3 (0+1+0+3)	Anna Carin Olofsson; Sweden	41:44.0 (0+1+1+1)	Olga Pyleva; Russia	41:48.7 (1+1+1+0)

=== Mixed ===
Event	Gold		Silver		Bronze	
4 × 6 km W+M relay	Russia Olga Pyleva; Svetlana Ishmouratova; Ivan Cherezov; Nikolay Kruglov, Jr.	1:13:24.1 (0+1) (0+2) (0+2) (0+0) (0+1) (0+0) (0+1) (0+2)	Russia Anna Bogaliy-Titovets; Olga Zaitseva; Sergey Tchepikov; Sergey Rozhkov	1:13:31.4 (0+0) (0+0) (1+3) (0+0) (0+0) (0+0) (0+1) (0+3)	Germany Uschi Disl; Kati Wilhelm; Michael Greis; Ricco Groß	1:13:58.3 (1+3) (0+3) (0+1) (0+2) (0+0) (0+0) (0+0) (0+3)

== Medal summary ==
Rank	Nation	Gold	Silver	Bronze	Total
1	Norway (NOR)	5	0	1	6
2	Germany (GER)	3	4	2	9
3	Russia (RUS)	1	3	2	6
4	Czech Republic (CZE)	1	0	0	1
5	China (CHN)	0	2	0	2
6	Sweden (SWE)	0	1	0	1
7	Belarus (BLR)	0	0	2	2
8	Austria (AUT)	0	0	1	1
8	France (FRA)	0	0	1	1
8	Latvia (LAT)	0	0	1	1
Totals (10 entries)		10	10	10	30
