= Cesana San Sicario =

Venue of the 2006 Winter Olympics in Italy

Coordinates: 44.95812°N 6.80620°E

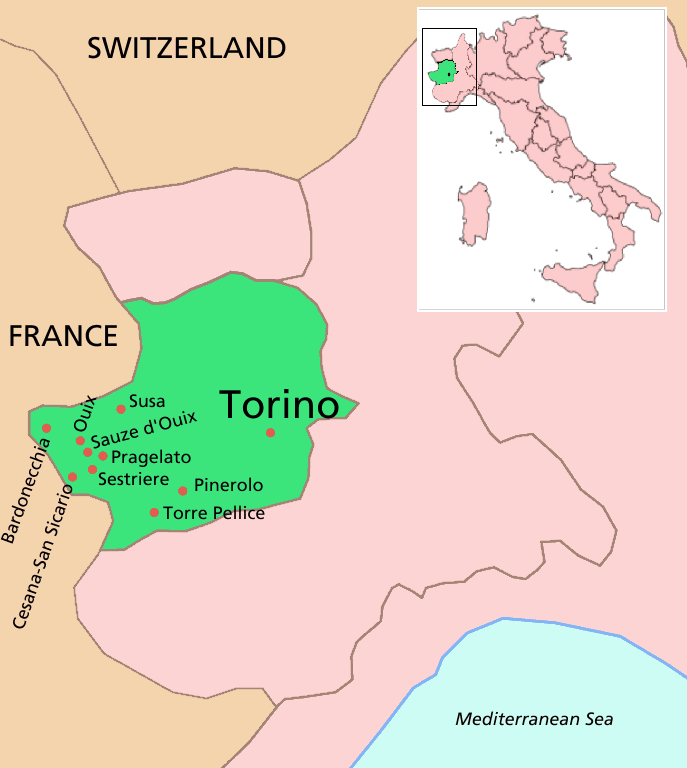
Location of the town shown on the map

Cesana San Sicario, located in Cesana Torinese, Italy was a location of a venue for the 2006 Winter Olympics in Turin, Italy. The biathlon facility is built for 6,500 spectators.

The accommodation is located in Cesana and lies in a large ski area named Via Lattea. It is directly connected to the winter venues in Monginevro and Sestriere.

The elevation of this area varies between 1630 and 1680 meters. The course is located near Cesana Pariol where the Winter Olympics's bobsled, luge and skeleton events were held. These venues were built as special venues for the Olympic Games with varying heights and difficulties. The facility is part of Torino Olympic Park, created to manage all of the venues used for the 2006 Winter Olympics.

== See also ==
- San Sicario Fraiteve
