= Biathlon at the 2006 Winter Olympics =

Biathlon at the XX Olympic Winter Games
- Venue: Cesana San Sicario
- Dates: 11–25 February
- No. of events: 10
- Competitors: 204 from 37 nations

Biathlon at the 2006 Winter Olympics consisted of ten biathlon events. They were held at the Cesana-San Sicario arena. The events began on 11 February and ended on 25 February 2006. Approximately 6,500 spectators were expected by the organizing committee. In these games, biathlon events were open to both men and women but they raced in different distances in their own events.

Men from 28 nations and women from 27 nations qualified to participate in the events. Only seven nations in total took home medals, Germany winning the most (5 gold, 4 silver, 2 bronze). Six biathletes won 3 medals each: Albina Akhatova, Kati Wilhelm, Martina Glagow, Michael Greis, Ole Einar Bjørndalen, and Sven Fischer. Greis won the most gold medals, with a total of three.

== Qualification ==
The top 20 countries at the International Biathlon Union Nations Cup ranking of 2004–05 are permitted to pick four biathletes for each event, and five biathletes for the whole Olympics. The top five may send a sixth biathlete as a reserve. The countries seeded 21st to 28th (27th for women) may send a maximum of one biathlete. Other countries may not send biathletes unless the top 28 countries do not fill their quota. These restrictions apply to each gender, so that the countries who appear in the top 20 in both the men's and the women's list are able to send five men and five women. All entries were to have been submitted to the organizing committee by 30 January 2006.

The following table lists the 28 nations that qualified for the men's events and the 27 nations that qualified for the women's events:

Rank	Men	Women	Rank	Men	Women
1	Norway	Russia	15	Estonia	Japan
2	Germany	Germany	16	Slovenia	Romania
3	Russia	Norway	17	United States	Finland
4	France	France	18	Slovakia	Canada
5	Austria	China	19	Canada	Moldova
6	Belarus	Belarus	20	Japan	Latvia
7	Sweden	Slovenia	21	Great Britain	Sweden
8	Ukraine	Czech Republic	22	China	Kazakhstan
9	Czech Republic	Bulgaria	23	Kazakhstan	Lithuania
10	Poland	Italy	24	Bulgaria	Estonia
11	Italy	Slovakia	25	Lithuania	Great Britain
12	Switzerland	Ukraine	26	Australia	Bosnia and Herzegovina
13	Latvia	Poland	27	Romania	Austria
14	Finland	United States	28	Hungary	

== Medal summary ==
=== Medal table ===
Of the thirty-seven competing nations, seven of them took home all the medals. With over double the medals of any other nation, Germany ranked number one.

Rank	Nation	Gold	Silver	Bronze	Total
1	Germany	5	4	2	11
2	Russia	2	1	2	5
3	France	2	0	2	4
4	Sweden	1	1	0	2
5	Norway	0	3	3	6
6	Poland	0	1	0	1
7	Ukraine	0	0	1	1
Totals (7 entries)		10	10	10	30

=== Men's events ===
Event	Gold		Silver		Bronze	
Individual	Michael Greis; Germany	54:23.0	Ole Einar Bjørndalen; Norway	54:39.0	Halvard Hanevold; Norway	55:31.9
Sprint	Sven Fischer; Germany	26:11.6	Halvard Hanevold; Norway	26:19.8	Frode Andresen; Norway	26:31.3
Pursuit	Vincent Defrasne; France	35:20.2	Ole Einar Bjørndalen; Norway	35:22.9	Sven Fischer; Germany	35:35.8
Mass start	Michael Greis; Germany	47:20.0	Tomasz Sikora; Poland	47:26.3	Ole Einar Bjørndalen; Norway	47:32.9
Relay	Germany; Ricco Groß; Michael Rösch; Sven Fischer; Michael Greis	1:21:51.5	Russia; Ivan Tcherezov; Sergei Tchepikov; Pavel Rostovtsev; Nikolay Kruglov, Jr.	1:22:12.4	France; Julien Robert; Vincent Defrasne; Ferréol Cannard; Raphaël Poirée	1:22:35.1

=== Women's events ===
Event	Gold		Silver		Bronze	
Individual	Svetlana Ishmouratova; Russia	49:24.1	Martina Glagow; Germany	50:34.9	Albina Akhatova; Russia	50:55.0
Sprint	Florence Baverel-Robert; France	22:31.4	Anna Carin Olofsson; Sweden	22:33.8	Lilia Efremova; Ukraine	22:38.0
Pursuit	Kati Wilhelm; Germany	36:43.6	Martina Glagow; Germany	37:57.2	Albina Akhatova; Russia	38:05.0
Mass start	Anna Carin Olofsson; Sweden	40:36.5	Kati Wilhelm; Germany	40:55.3	Uschi Disl; Germany	41:18.4
Relay	Russia; Anna Bogaliy-Titovets; Svetlana Ishmouratova; Olga Zaitseva; Albina Akhatova	1:16:12.5	Germany; Martina Glagow; Andrea Henkel; Katrin Apel; Kati Wilhelm	1:17:03.2	France; Delphyne Peretto; Florence Baverel-Robert; Sylvie Becaert; Sandrine Bailly	1:18:38.7

Olga Pyleva of Russia originally placed second in the women's individual race, but was found to be in violation of anti-doping rules when she tested positive for carphedon, and she was then disqualified.

== Participating nations ==
Thirty-seven nations qualified biathletes to compete in the events. Below is a list of the competing nations; in parentheses are the number of national competitors.

- Argentina (1)
- Austria (6)
- Australia (1)
- Bosnia and Herzegovina (2)
- Belarus (10)
- Bulgaria (6)
- Canada (7)
- Chile (2)
- China (6)
- Croatia (1)
- Czech Republic (10)
- Spain (1)
- Estonia (6)
- Finland (1)
- France (9)
- Great Britain (2)
- Germany (10)
- Greece (1)
- Hungary (2)
- Italy (10)
- Japan (9)
- Kazakhstan (2)
- South Korea (1)
- Latvia (9)
- Lithuania (2)
- Moldova (4)
- Norway (10)
- Poland (10)
- Romania (5)
- Russia (12)
- Serbia and Montenegro (1)
- Slovenia (8)
- Switzerland (2)
- Slovakia (10)
- Sweden (6)
- Ukraine (10)
- United States (9)

== See also ==
- Biathlon at the 2006 Winter Paralympics
