= Biathlon World Championships 2002 =

Sports competition in Oslo, Norway

- Host city: Oslo
- Country: Norway
- Events: 2
- Opening: 24 March 2002
- Closing: 24 March 2002

The 37th Biathlon World Championships held in 2002 for the third time in Oslo, Norway were only for the mass start because these events were not part of the Olympic programme in Salt Lake City.

== Men's results ==
=== 15 km mass start ===
Medal	Name	Nation	Penalties	Result
1st place, gold medalist(s)	Raphaël Poirée	FRA	1+0+0+1	37:57.8
2nd place, silver medalist(s)	Sven Fischer	GER	1+0+1+2	+ 17.9
3rd place, bronze medalist(s)	Frode Andresen	NOR	0+2+1+2	+ 26.5

== Women's results ==
=== 12.5 km mass start ===
Medal	Name	Nation	Penalties	Result
1st place, gold medalist(s)	Olena Zubrilova	UKR	0+0+0+0	37:09.5
2nd place, silver medalist(s)	Olga Pyleva	RUS	0+0+1+0	+ 21.3
3rd place, bronze medalist(s)	Olga Nazarova	BLR	0+1+0+0	+ 37.7

== Medal table ==
Place	Nation	1st place, gold medalist(s)	2nd place, silver medalist(s)	3rd place, bronze medalist(s)	Total
1	France	1	0	0	1
1	Ukraine	1	0	0	1
3	Germany	0	1	0	1
3	Russia	0	1	0	1
5	Belarus	0	0	1	1
5	Norway	0	0	1	1
