= Proksch =

Proksch is a surname. Notable people with the surname include:

- Alfred Proksch (1908–2011), Austrian athlete
- Alfred Proksch (politician) (1891–1981), Austrian Nazi party official
- Josef Proksch (1794–1864), Czech pianist and composer
- Marie Proksch (1836–1900), Czech pianist, music educator, and composer
- Mark Proksch (born 1978), American comedian, actor, and writer
- Peter Proksch (1935–2012), Austrian artist
- Udo Proksch (1934–2001), Austrian fraudster and killer
