= Udo Proksch =

Austrian businessman and criminal

- Born: 29 May 1934; Rostock, Nazi Germany
- Died: 27 June 2001 (aged 67); Graz, Austria
- Resting place: Heiligenstädter Friedhof, Döbling, Vienna
- Occupations: Businessperson, designer, restaurateur
- Known for: planting a time bomb on the freighter Lucona in 1977 as part of an insurance fraud
- Partners: several high-ranking politicians who were shareholders in Proksch's company
- Status: Deceased
- Motive: Financial gain
- Convictions: Murder (6 counts); Attempted murder (6 counts)
- Penalty: Life imprisonment
- Wanted since: 1988
- Time at large: more than a year

Details
- Date: 23 January 1977
- Location: Indian Ocean
- Killed: 6
- Injured: 6
- Weapon: Time bomb
- Date apprehended: 2 October 1989
- Imprisoned at: Graz-Karlau Prison

Udo Proksch (29 May 1934 – 27 June 2001) was an Austrian businessman and industrialist. In 1991, he was convicted of the murder of six people as part of a major insurance fraud. Proksch died in prison.

== Lucona sinking ==
In 1977, the ship Lucona sank in the Indian Ocean, after an explosion, killing six people. Proksch, the owner of the cargo, also then owner of famous Viennese confectioners' Demel, claimed US$20 million from his insurance company, saying that the ship was carrying expensive uranium mining equipment. Fraud was suspected; but investigations were obstructed by powerful Austrian politicians who were friends of Proksch.

In 1988, Proksch fled to the Philippines after Hans Pretterebner published a book about the scandal.

In 1989, he returned to Vienna incognito, but was recognized and arrested. In 1990, Lucona was located by American shipwreck hunter David Mearns, who discovered that the ship had been sunk by a time bomb.

On 11 March 1991, Proksch was sentenced to 20 years in prison. A year later, the sentence was increased to a lifelong term in prison. Several ex-ministers were also eventually convicted over their involvement. The ex-minister of foreign affairs was sentenced for forging documents authenticating the cargo. Two other ministers were dismissed for obstructing the investigations. The minister of defence Karl Lütgendorf, a shareholder in the Proksch firm, had given permission to deliver explosives to sabotage the ship; he killed himself when his role in the case became clear.

Proksch died on 27 June 2001, during heart surgery in the prison hospital.

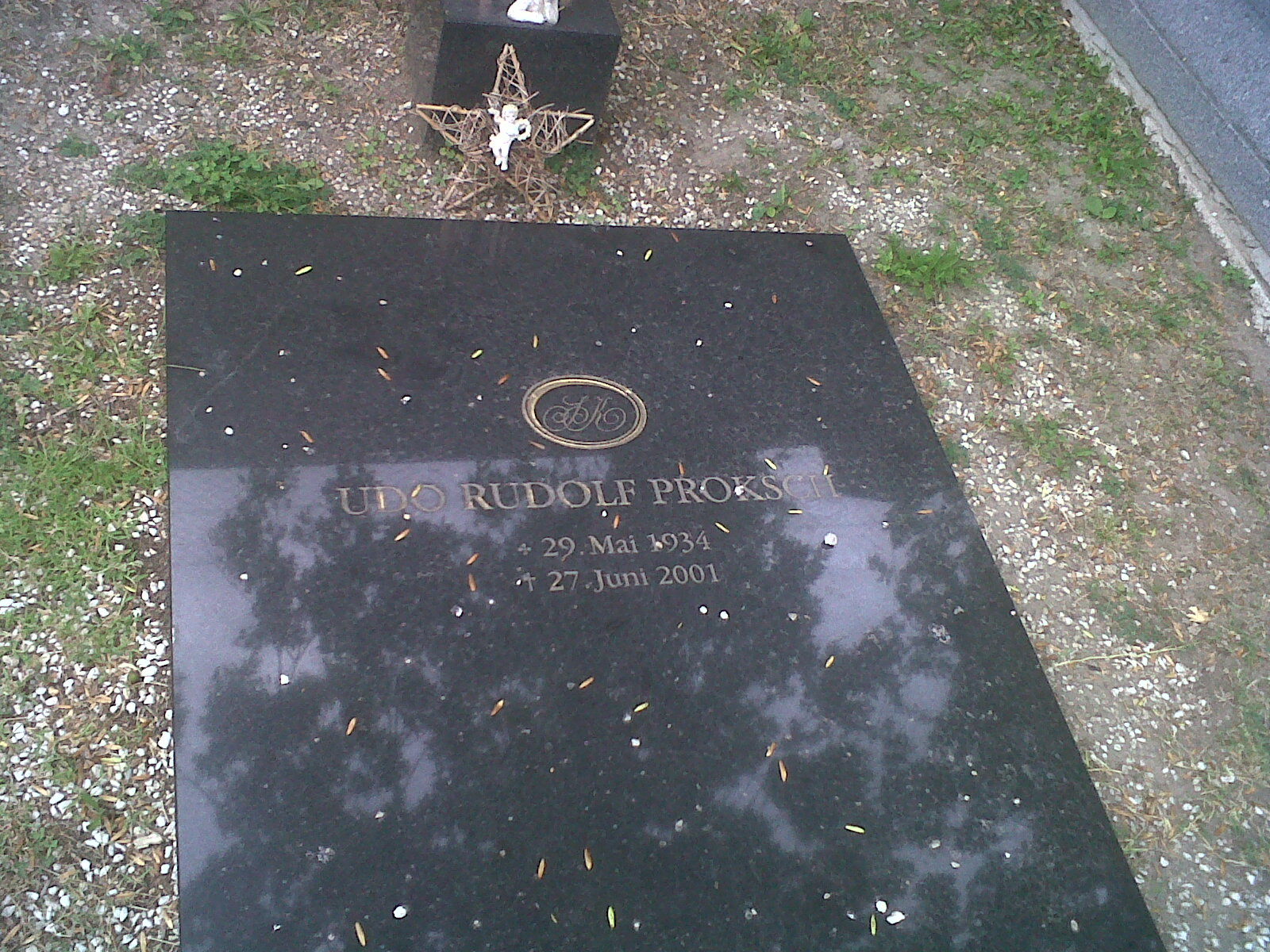
Tombstone of Proksch's grave at the Heiligenstädter Friedhof

Proksch was the first husband of the actress Daphne Wagner, daughter of Wieland Wagner, great-granddaughter of the composer Richard Wagner and great-great-granddaughter of Franz Liszt.

== Works about Proksch and the Lucona case ==
- 1988: Hans Pretterebner publishes a book about the Lucona case, Der Fall Lucona.
- 1993: The Lucona Affair, a film about the Lucona case (starring David Suchet).
- 2004: The art group monochrom stages Udo 77, a musical about the life of Udo Proksch.
- 2010: A documentary about Proksch, entitled Udo Proksch: Out of Control and directed by Robert Dornhelm is released.
- 2023: Drain the Oceans (Season 6, Episode 6), television documentary by National Geographic.

== See also ==
- Proksch
