= Hochfilzen =

- Municipality
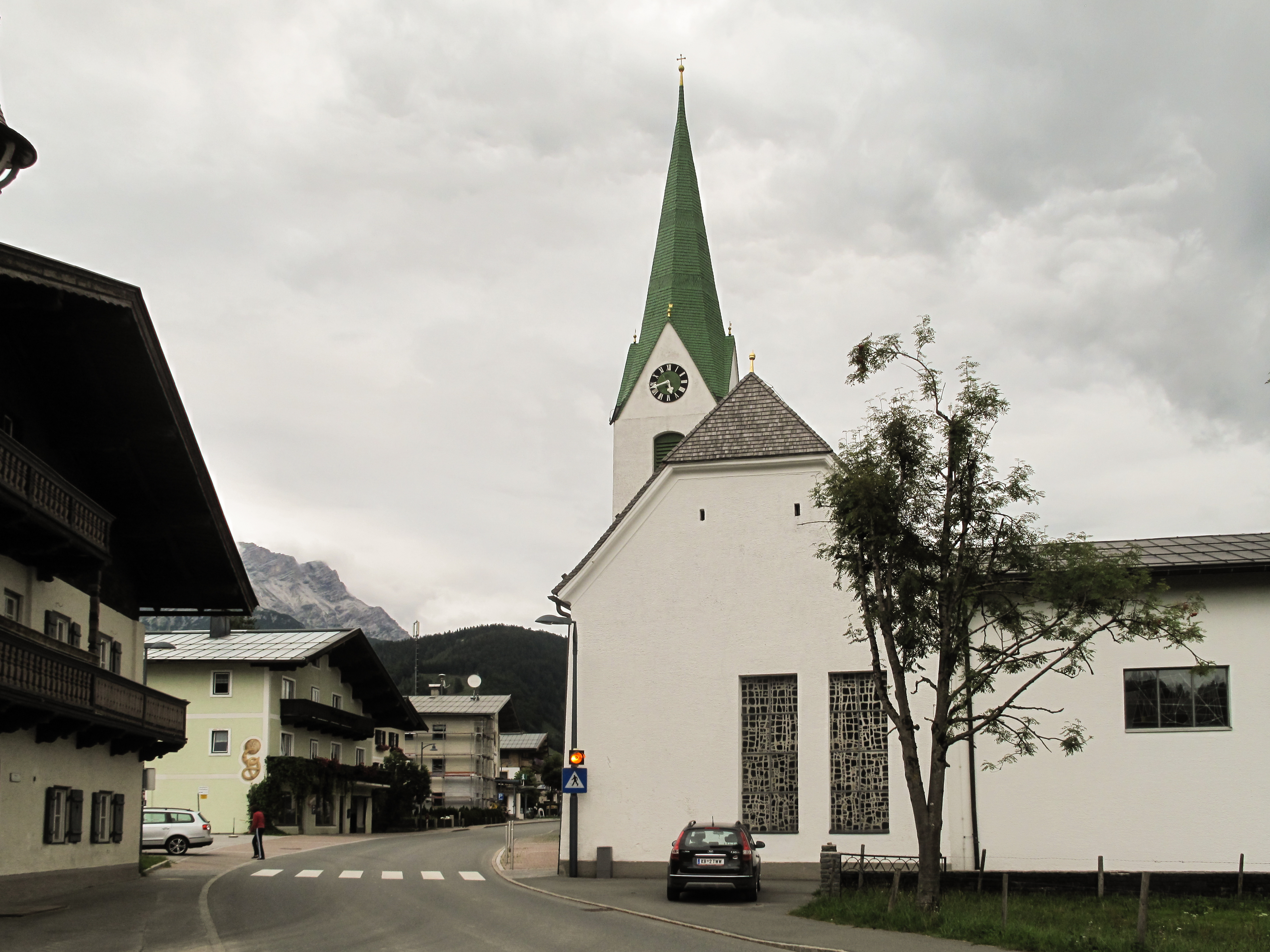
- Church of Our Lady of the Snow

- Coat of arms

- Location within Austria
- Coordinates: 47°28′10″N 12°37′21″E
- Country: Austria
- State: Tyrol
- District: Kitzbühel

Government
  - Mayor: Konrad Walk (Bürgerliste)

Area
  - Total: 32.68 km^{2} (12.62 sq mi)
- Elevation: 959 m (3,146 ft)

Population (2018-01-01)
  - Total: 1,196
  - Density: 36.60/km^{2} (94.79/sq mi)
- Time zone: UTC+1 (CET)
  - Summer (DST): UTC+2 (CEST)
- Postal code: 6395
- Area code: 05359
- Vehicle registration: KB
- Website: Gemeinde Hochfilzen

Hochfilzen is a town and municipality in the Kitzbühel district of the Austrian state of Tyrol. It is located in the Pillersee valley 5 km east of Fieberbrunn. Population was 1,147 in 2016.

It is a popular winter sports resort, especially for cross-country skiing. In 2017 (9 to 19 February) it hosted the Biathlon World Championships, as it also did in 2005, 1998 and 1978, and it is a regular venue in the annual IBU World Cup series.

== Training area ==
In 1875 Hochfilzen was joined to the railway network and soon afterwards a military training area was established here. The training area is used today by the Austrian Bundesheer as an army sports centre for biathlon as well as survival training by the Jagdkommando. The training area was once one of the scenes in the Lucona Scandal, which shook Austrian politics at the end of the 1970s.

== Population ==
Historical population
| Year | Pop. | ±% |
|---|---|---|
| 1869 | 285 | — |
| 1880 | 332 | +16.5% |
| 1890 | 341 | +2.7% |
| 1900 | 376 | +10.3% |
| 1910 | 453 | +20.5% |
| 1923 | 465 | +2.6% |
| 1934 | 499 | +7.3% |
| 1939 | 526 | +5.4% |
| 1951 | 645 | +22.6% |
| 1961 | 956 | +48.2% |
| 1971 | 1,098 | +14.9% |
| 1981 | 1,059 | −3.6% |
| 1991 | 1,111 | +4.9% |
| 2001 | 1,109 | −0.2% |
| 2011 | 1,123 | +1.3% |

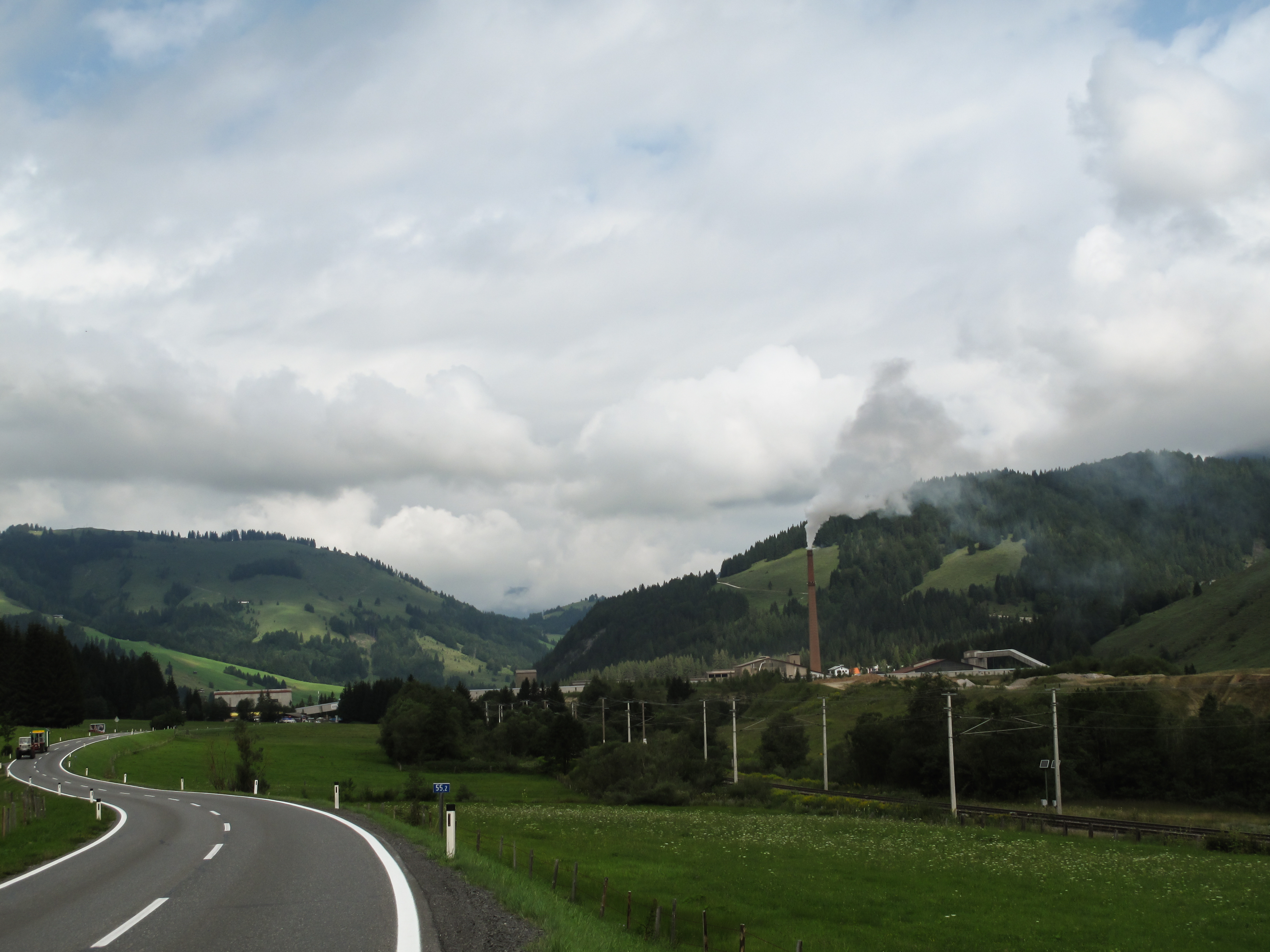
Hochfilzen, road panorama with smoking chimney

== See also ==
- Wiesensee (Tirol), a glacial lake in the northwest corner of the municipality
