= Niki Lauda =

Austrian racing driver (1949–2019)

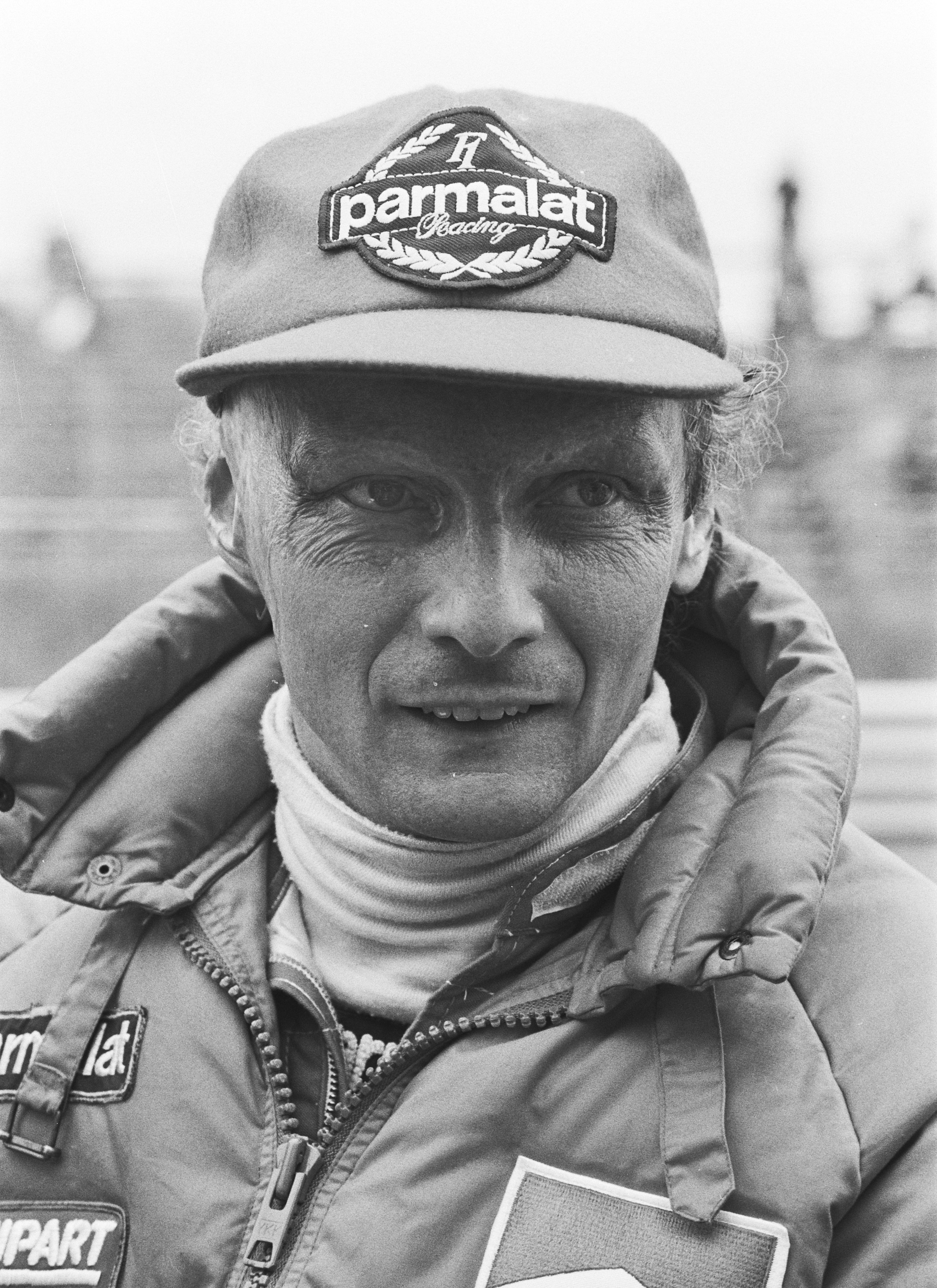
- Lauda at the 1982 Dutch Grand Prix
- Born: Andreas Nikolaus Lauda; 22 February 1949; Vienna, Allied-occupied Austria
- Died: 20 May 2019 (aged 70); Zürich, Switzerland
- Resting place: Heiligenstädter Friedhof
- Spouses: Marlene Knaus (m. 1976; div. 1991) Birgit Wetzinger (m. 2008)
- Children: 4, including Mathias

Formula One World Championship career
- Nationality: (Austria) Austrian
- Active years: 1971–1979, 1982–1985
- Team(s): March, BRM, Ferrari, Brabham, McLaren
- Entries: 177 (171 starts)
- Championships: 3 (1975, 1977, 1984)
- Wins: 25
- Podiums: 54
- Career points: 420.5
- Pole positions: 24
- Fastest laps: 24
- First entry: 1971 Austrian Grand Prix
- First win: 1974 Spanish Grand Prix
- Last win: 1985 Dutch Grand Prix
- Last entry: 1985 Australian Grand Prix

Andreas Nikolaus "Niki" Lauda (22 February 1949 – 20 May 2019) was an Austrian racing driver, motorsport executive, and aviation entrepreneur, who competed in Formula One from 1971 to 1979 and from 1982 to 1985. Lauda won three Formula One World Drivers' Championship titles and—at the time of his retirement—held the record for most podium finishes (54); he won 25 Grands Prix across 13 seasons, and remains the only driver to have won a World Drivers' Championship with both Ferrari and McLaren.

Born and raised in Vienna, Lauda was the grandson of local industrialist Hans Lauda. Starting his career in karting, he progressed to Formula Vee and privateer racing in the late 1960s. After his career stalled, Lauda took out a £30,000 bank loan and secured a place in European Formula Two with March Engineering in 1971, making his Formula One debut with the team at the Austrian Grand Prix; he later admitted that it should have never worked. He was promoted to a full-time seat in 1972, ending the season with a non-classified championship finish, while winning the British Formula Two Championship. Lauda moved to BRM for the 1973 season, scoring his maiden points finish in Belgium and earning a seat with Ferrari the following year alongside Clay Regazzoni. Lauda took his maiden podium in his debut for Ferrari, and his maiden victory three races later at the Spanish Grand Prix. After winning five Grands Prix in his 1975 campaign, Lauda won his first title, becoming the first Ferrari-powered World Drivers' Champion in 11 years.

While leading the 1976 championship—amid a fierce title battle with James Hunt—Lauda was seriously injured during the German Grand Prix at the Nürburgring, suffering severe burns and other life-changing injuries when his Ferrari 312T2 caught fire during a crash. He returned to racing six weeks later at the Italian Grand Prix, eventually losing the title to Hunt by one point. Lauda remained at Ferrari in 1977, winning several races on the way to his second championship and clinching the title at the United States Grand Prix. He eventually left Ferrari, where he was replaced by Gilles Villeneuve, and signed with Brabham in 1978, achieving podiums in every race he finished that season, with victories in Sweden and Italy. Amid a winless 1979 season for Brabham, which had moved to Ford Cosworth V8 engines, Lauda left the team after the Italian Grand Prix, and took a two-year hiatus from racing.

He returned with McLaren in 1982, winning multiple races. After a winless 1983 campaign, Lauda was partnered by Alain Prost the following season, where he beat Prost to his third title by a record half-point. (Note: From 1980 until 2022, half-points were awarded in Formula One for incomplete races that had run between two laps and 75% of the scheduled race distance.) With seven years between his second and third championships, Lauda holds the record for the longest period in the history of the sport between World Championship victories, breaking Jack Brabham's record of six. Lauda retired after the 1985 season—taking his final victory at the Dutch Grand Prix—having achieved 25 race wins, 24 pole positions, 24 fastest laps, and 54 podiums in Formula One.

Outside of Formula One, Lauda won the Nürburgring 24 Hours in 1973 with Alpina, and the inaugural BMW M1 Procar Championship in 1979 with Project Four. In aviation, Lauda founded and managed three airlines: Lauda Air from 1985 to 1999, Niki from 2003 to 2011, and Lauda from 2016 onwards. He returned to Formula One in an advisory role at Ferrari in 1993, and was the team principal of Jaguar from 2001 to 2002. From 2012 until his death, Lauda was the non-executive chairman and co-owner of Mercedes, winning six consecutive World Constructors' Championships with the team from 2014 to 2019. Lauda was inducted into the International Motorsports Hall of Fame in 1993.

== Early years in racing ==
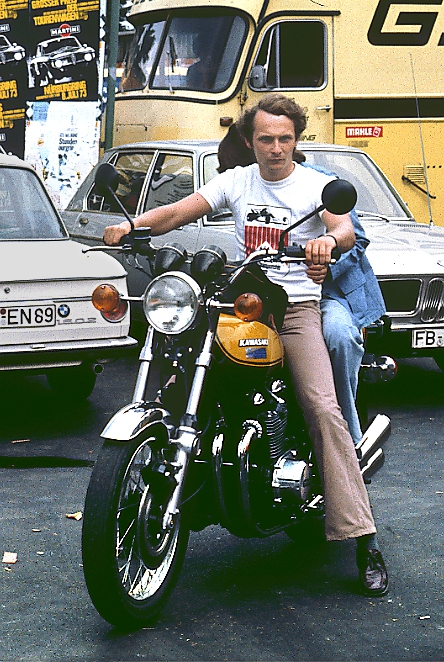
Lauda at the Nürburgring in 1973, three years before his accident

Lauda was born on 22 February 1949 in Vienna, Austria, to a wealthy paper manufacturing family. His paternal grandfather was the Viennese-born industrialist Hans Lauda.

Lauda became a racing driver despite his family's disapproval. After starting out with a Mini, Lauda moved on into Formula Vee, as was normal in Central Europe, but rapidly moved up to drive in private Porsche and Chevron sports cars. With his career stalled, he took out a £30,000 bank loan, secured by a life insurance policy, to buy his way into the fledgling March team as a Formula Two driver in 1971. Because of his family's disapproval, he had an ongoing feud with them over his racing ambitions and abandoned further contact.

Lauda was quickly promoted to the Formula One team, but drove for March in Formula One and Formula Two in 1972. Although the latter cars were good and Lauda's driving skills impressed March principal Robin Herd, March's 1972 Formula One season was catastrophic. Perhaps the lowest point of the team's season came at the Canadian Grand Prix at Mosport Park, where both March cars were disqualified within three laps of each other, just past three-quarters of the race distance.

In 1973, Lauda took out another bank loan to buy his way into the BRM team. Lauda was instantly quick, but the team was in decline. Although the BRM P160E was fast and easy to drive it was not reliable and its engine lacked power. Lauda's popularity was on the rise after he was running third at the Monaco Grand Prix that year before a gearbox failure ended his race prematurely, resulting in Enzo Ferrari becoming interested. When his BRM teammate Clay Regazzoni left to rejoin Ferrari in 1974, team owner Enzo Ferrari asked him what he thought of Lauda. Regazzoni spoke so favorably of Lauda that Ferrari promptly signed him, paying him enough to clear his debts.

== Ferrari (1974–1977) ==
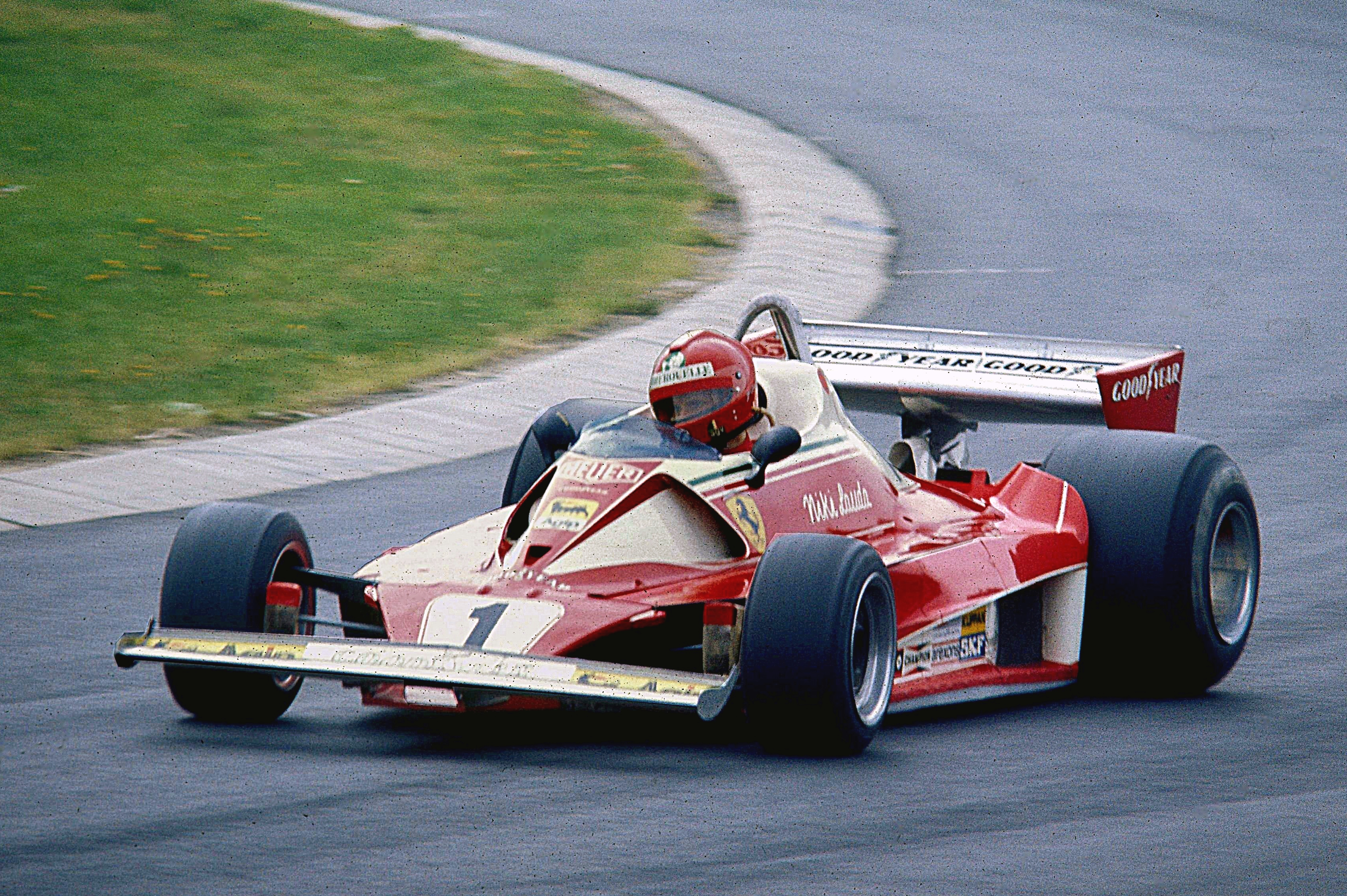
Lauda practicing at the Nürburgring during the 1976 German Grand Prix

After an unsuccessful start to the 1970s, culminating in a disastrous start to the 1973 season, Ferrari regrouped completely under Luca di Montezemolo and were resurgent in 1974. The team's faith in the little-known Lauda was quickly rewarded by a second-place finish in his debut race for the team, the season-opening Argentine Grand Prix. His first Grand Prix (GP) victory—and the first for Ferrari since 1972—followed only three races later in the Spanish Grand Prix. Although Lauda became the season's pacesetter, achieving six consecutive pole positions, a mixture of inexperience and mechanical unreliability meant Lauda won only one more race that year, the Dutch GP. He finished fourth in the Drivers' Championship and demonstrated immense commitment to testing and improving the car.

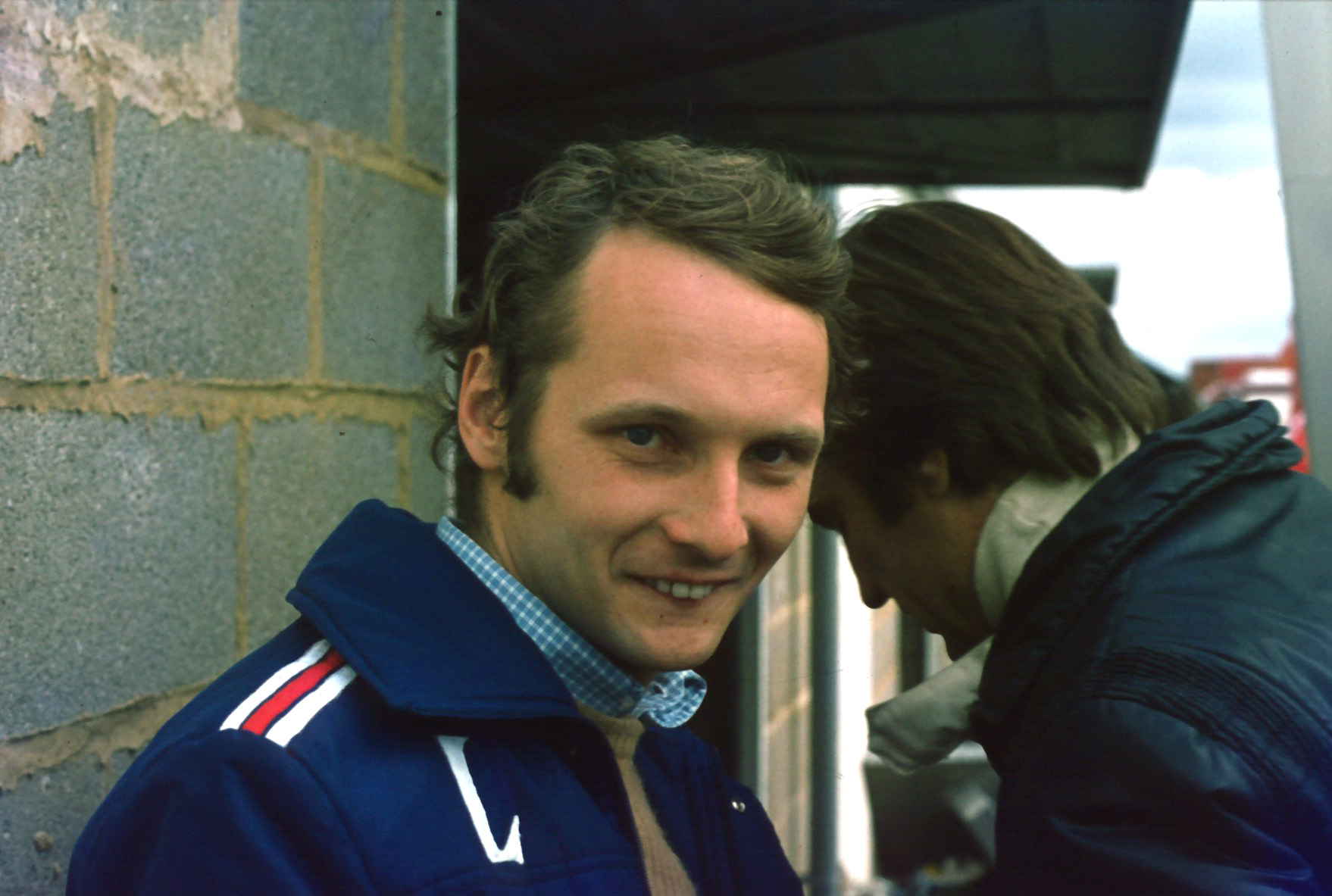
Lauda in 1975

The 1975 Formula One season started slowly for Lauda; after no better than a fifth-place finish in the first four races, he won four of the next five driving the new Ferrari 312T. His first World Championship was confirmed with a third-place finish at the Italian Grand Prix at Monza; Lauda's teammate Regazzoni won the race and Ferrari clinched their first Constructors' Championship in 11 years. Lauda then picked up a fifth win at the last race of the year, the United States GP at Watkins Glen.

He also became the first driver to lap the Nürburgring Nordschleife in under seven minutes, which was considered a huge feat as the Nordschleife section of the Nürburgring was two miles longer than it is today. Lauda did not win the German Grand Prix from pole position there that year; after battling hard with Patrick Depailler for the lead for the first half of the race, Lauda led for the first nine laps but suffered a puncture at the Wippermann, nine miles into the 10th lap and was passed by Carlos Reutemann, James Hunt, Tom Pryce and Jacques Laffite.

Lauda made it back to the pits with a damaged front wing and a destroyed left front tyre. The Ferrari pit changed the destroyed tyre and Lauda managed to make it to the podium in third behind Reutemann and Laffite after Hunt retired and Pryce had to slow down because of a fuel leak. Lauda was known for giving away any trophies he won to his local garage in exchange for his car to be washed and serviced.

Unlike 1975 and amidst tensions between Lauda and Montezemolo's successor, Daniele Audetto, Lauda dominated the start of the 1976 Formula One season, winning four of the first six races and finishing second in the other two. By the time of his fifth win of the year at the British GP, he had more than doubled the points of his closest challengers Jody Scheckter and James Hunt, and a second consecutive World Championship appeared a formality. It was a feat not achieved since Jack Brabham's victories in 1959 and 1960. He also looked set to win the most races in a season, a record held by the late Jim Clark since 1963.

=== 1976 Nürburgring crash ===
A week before the 1976 German Grand Prix at the Nürburgring, even though he was the fastest driver on that circuit at the time, Lauda urged his fellow drivers to boycott the race, largely because of the 23-kilometre (14 mi) circuit's safety arrangements, citing the organisers' lack of resources to properly manage such a huge circuit, including lack of fire marshals, fire and safety equipment, and safety vehicles. Formula One was quite dangerous at the time (three of the drivers present that day later died in Formula One incidents: Tom Pryce in 1977; Ronnie Peterson in 1978; and Patrick Depailler in 1980), but a majority of the drivers voted against the boycott and the race went ahead.

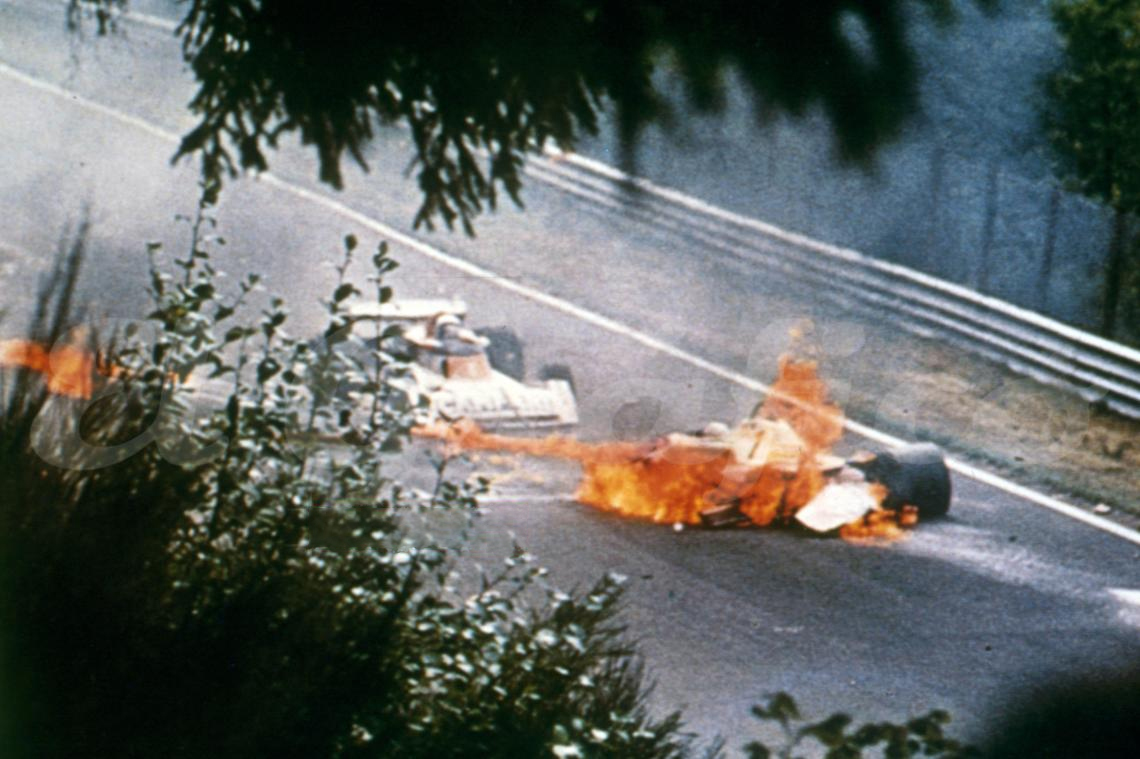
Lauda's car on fire

On 1 August 1976, during the second lap at the very fast left kink before Bergwerk, Lauda was involved in an accident where his Ferrari swerved off the track, hit an embankment, burst into flames, and made contact with Brett Lunger's Surtees-Ford car. Unlike Lunger, Lauda was trapped in the wreckage. Drivers Arturo Merzario, Lunger, Guy Edwards, and Harald Ertl arrived at the scene a few moments later, but before Merzario was able to pull him from his car, Lauda suffered severe burns to his head and hands and inhaled hot toxic gases that damaged his lungs and blood. In an interview with BBC Radio 5 Live, Lauda said:

There were basically two or three drivers trying to get me out of the car, but one was Arturo Merzario, the Italian guy, who also had to stop there at the scene, because I blocked the road; and he really came into the car himself, and uh, triggered my, my seatbelt loose, and then pulled me out. It was unbelievable, how he could do that, and I met him afterwards, and I said, 'How could you do it?!'. He said, 'Honestly, I do not know, but to open your seatbelt was so difficult, because you were pushing so hard against it, and when it was open, I got you out of the car like a feather...'.

— "I Was There – May 21, 2019"; "Niki Lauda speaks in 2015"

As Lauda was wearing a modified helmet, it did not fit properly; the foam had compressed and it slid off his head after the accident, leaving his face exposed to the fire. Although Lauda was conscious and able to stand immediately after the accident, he later lapsed into a coma. While in the hospital, he was given the last rites.

Lauda suffered extensive scarring from the burns to his head, losing most of his right ear as well as the hair on the right side of his head, his eyebrows, and his eyelids. He chose to limit reconstructive surgery to replacing the eyelids and restoring their functionality. After the accident he always wore a cap to cover the scars on his head. He arranged for sponsors to use the cap for advertising.

With Lauda out of the contest, Carlos Reutemann was taken on as his replacement. Ferrari boycotted the Austrian Grand Prix in protest at what they saw as preferential treatment shown toward McLaren driver James Hunt at the Spanish and British Grands Prix.

The corner where the accident happened was subsequently named Lauda Links (Lauda Left).

=== Return to racing ===
Lauda missed only two races, appearing at the Monza press conference six weeks after the accident with his fresh burns still bandaged. He finished fourth in the Italian Grand Prix, whilst being, by his own admission, absolutely petrified. Formula One journalist Nigel Roebuck recalls seeing Lauda in the pits, peeling the blood-soaked bandages off his scarred scalp. He also had to wear a specially adapted crash helmet so as not to be in too much discomfort. In Lauda's absence, Hunt had mounted a late charge to reduce Lauda's lead in the World Championship standings. Hunt and Lauda were friends away from the circuit, and their personal on-track rivalry, while intense, was considered cleanly contested and fair. Following up with wins in the Canadian and United States Grands Prix, Hunt stood only three points behind Lauda before the final race of the season: the Japanese Grand Prix.

Lauda qualified third, one place behind Hunt. On race day there was torrential rain, and Lauda retired his car after two laps. He later said that he felt it was unsafe to continue under those conditions, especially since his eyes were watering excessively because of his fire-damaged tear ducts and inability to blink. Hunt led much of the race before his tyres blistered and a pit stop dropped him down the order. He recovered to place third in the race, thus winning the title by a single point. Hunt later stated that what Lauda did was an act of bravery.

Lauda's previously good relationship with Ferrari was severely affected by his decision to withdraw from the Japanese Grand Prix, and he endured a difficult 1977 season; he won the championship through consistency rather than outright pace. Lauda disliked his new teammate, Reutemann, who had served as his replacement driver. Lauda was not comfortable with this move and felt he had been let down by Ferrari. "We never could stand each other, and instead of taking pressure off me, they put on even more by bringing Carlos Reutemann into the team." Having announced his decision to quit Ferrari at season's end, Lauda left earlier, after he won the Drivers' Championship at the United States Grand Prix, because of the team's decision to run the unknown Gilles Villeneuve in a third car at the Canadian Grand Prix.

== Brabham and first retirement (1978–1979) ==
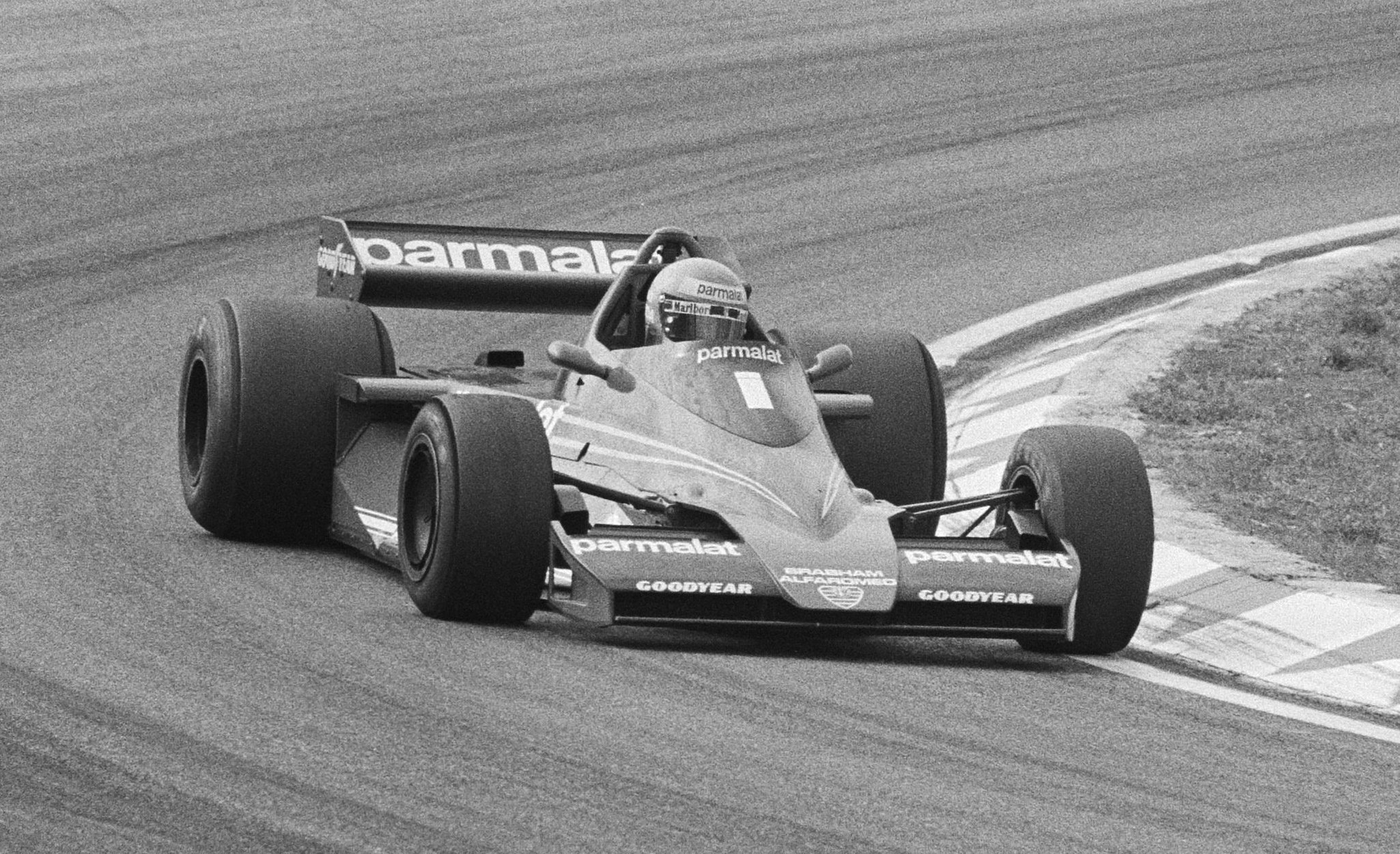
Lauda in the Brabham-Alfa Romeo at Zandvoort (1978)

Joining Parmalat-sponsored Brabham-Alfa Romeo in 1978 for a $1 million salary, Lauda endured two unsuccessful seasons, remembered mainly for his one race in the Brabham BT46B, a radical design known as the Fan Car: it won its first and only race at the Swedish GP, but Brabham did not use the car in Formula One again. Other teams vigorously protested the fan car's legality and Brabham team owner Bernie Ecclestone, who at the time was maneuvering for acquisition of Formula One's commercial rights, did not want to fight a protracted battle over the car, but the victory in Sweden remained official.

The Brabham BT46 Alfa Romeo flat-12 began the 1978 season at the third race in South Africa. It suffered from a variety of troubles that forced Lauda to retire the car nine out of 14 races. Lauda's best results, apart from the win in Sweden, was a win in Italy after the penalisation of Mario Andretti and Gilles Villeneuve, second places in Monaco and Great Britain, and a third in the Netherlands.

The Alfa flat-12 engine was too wide for ground effect designs in that the opposed cylinder banks impeded with the venturi tunnels, so Alfa designed a V12 for 1979. It was the fourth 12-cylinder engine design that propelled the Austrian in Formula One since 1973. Lauda's 1979 Formula One season was again marred by retirements and poor pace, even though he won the non-championship 1979 Dino Ferrari Grand Prix with the Brabham-Alfa. In the single-make BMW M1 Procar Championship, driving for the British Formula Two team Project Four Racing (led by Ron Dennis) when not in a factory entry, Lauda won three races for P4 plus the series. Decades later, Lauda won a BMW Procar exhibition race event before the 2008 German Grand Prix.

In September, Lauda finished fourth in Monza, and won the non-WC Imola event, still with the Alfa V12 engine. After that, Brabham returned to the familiar Cosworth V8. In late September, during practice for the 1979 Canadian Grand Prix, Lauda cut short a practice session and promptly informed team principal Ecclestone, that he wished to retire immediately, as he had no more desire to "continue the silliness of driving around in circles." Lauda, who in the meantime had founded Lauda Air, a charter airline, returned to Austria to run the company full-time.

== McLaren comeback, third world title, and second retirement (1982–1985) ==
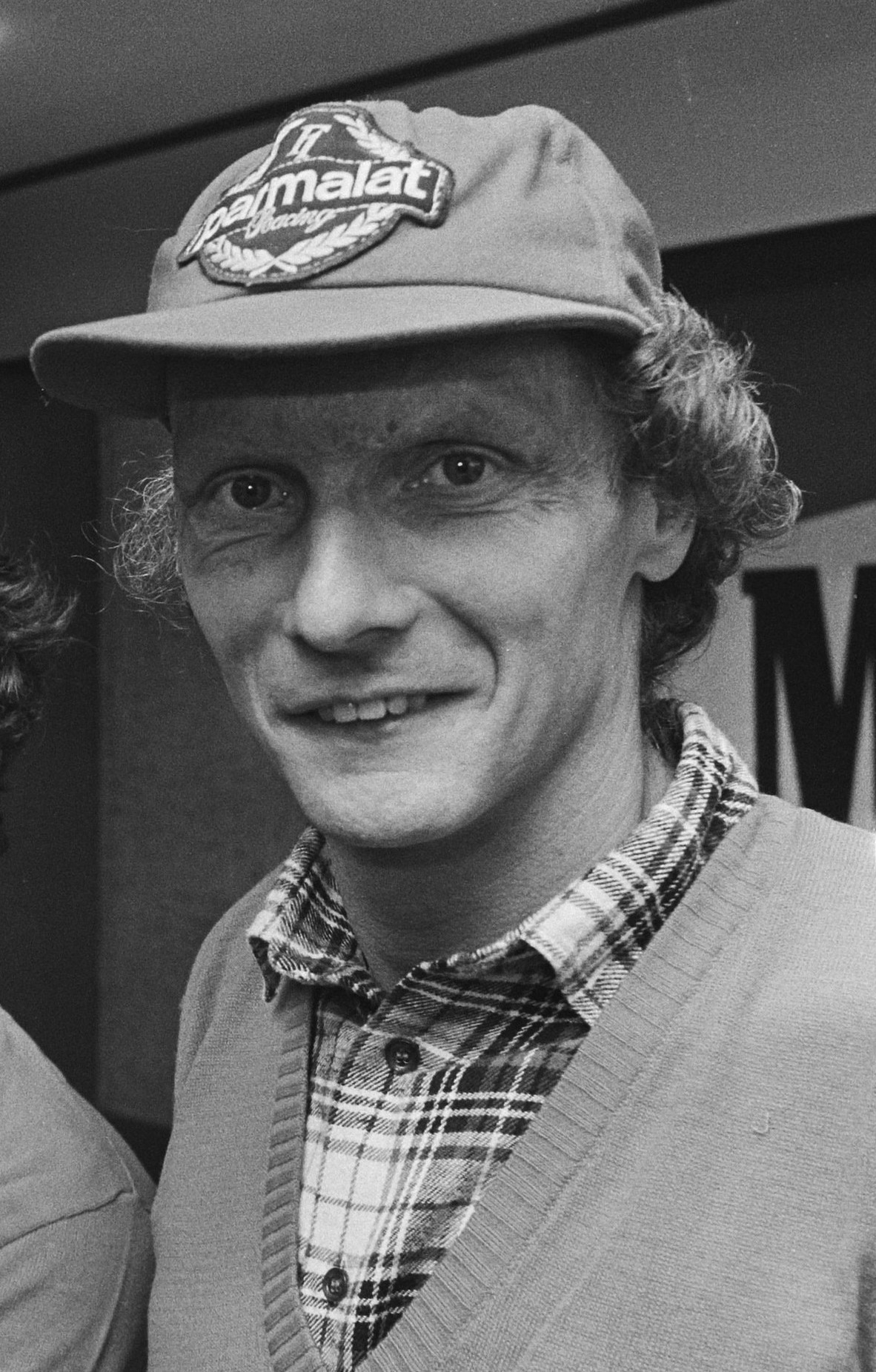
Lauda in 1984

In 1982, Lauda returned to racing, for an unprecedented $3 million salary. After a successful test with McLaren, the only problem was to convince then team sponsor Marlboro that he was still capable of winning. Lauda proved he was when, in his third race back, he won the Long Beach Grand Prix. Before the opening race of the season at Kyalami race track in South Africa, Lauda was the organiser of the so-called "drivers' strike"; Lauda had seen that the new Super Licence required the drivers to commit themselves to their present teams and realised that this could hinder a driver's negotiating position. The drivers, with the exception of Teo Fabi, barricaded themselves in a banqueting suite at Sunnyside Park Hotel until they had won the day.

The 1983 season proved to be transitional for the McLaren team as they were making a change from Ford-Cosworth engines, to TAG-badged Porsche turbo engines, and Lauda did not win a race that year, with his best finish being second at Long Beach behind his teammate John Watson. Some political maneuvering by Lauda forced a furious chief designer John Barnard to design an interim car earlier than expected to get the TAG-Porsche engine some much-needed race testing; Lauda nearly won the last race of the season in South Africa.

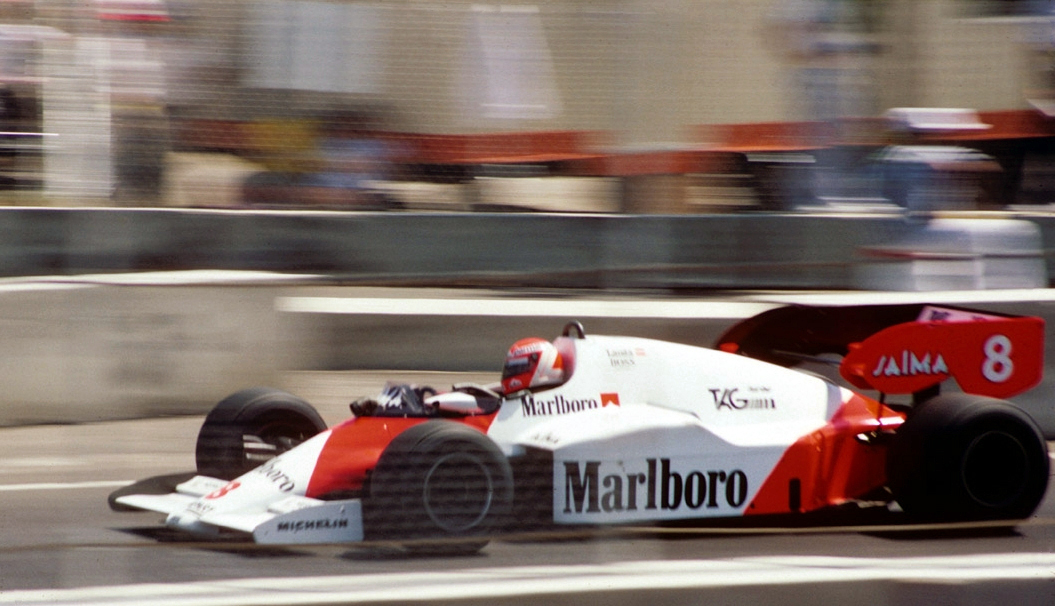
Five years after his first retirement, Lauda won his third title driving a McLaren MP4/2.

Lauda won a third world championship in 1984 by half a point over teammate Alain Prost, due only to half points being awarded for the shortened 1984 Monaco Grand Prix. His Austrian Grand Prix victory that year is so far the only time an Austrian has won his home Grand Prix. Initially, Lauda did not want Prost to become his teammate, as he presented a much faster rival. However, during the two seasons together, they had a good relationship and Lauda later said that beating the talented Frenchman was a big motivator for him.

The whole season continued to be dominated by Lauda and Prost, who won 12 of 16 races. Lauda won five races, while Prost won seven. However, Lauda, who set a record for the most pole positions in a season during the 1975 season, rarely matched his teammate in qualifying. Lauda's championship win came in Portugal, when he had to start in eleventh place on the grid, while Prost qualified on the front row. Prost did everything he could, starting from second and winning his seventh race of the season, but Lauda's calculating drive (which included setting the fastest race lap), passing car after car, saw him finish second behind his teammate which gave him enough points to win his third title.

His second place was a lucky one though as Nigel Mansell was in second for much of the race. As it was his last race with Lotus before joining Williams in 1985, Lotus boss Peter Warr refused to give Mansell the brakes he wanted for his car and the Englishman retired with brake failure on lap 52. As Lauda had passed the Toleman of rookie Ayrton Senna for third place only a few laps earlier, Mansell's retirement elevated him to second behind Prost.

Lauda signed an initial letter of intent to leave McLaren team and join Renault for the 1985 season. The agreement was not implemented and Lauda stayed with McLaren for the 1985 season.

The 1985 season was a disappointment for Lauda, with eleven retirements from the fourteen races he started. He did not start the Belgian Grand Prix at Spa-Francorchamps after crashing and breaking his wrist during practice, and he later missed the European Grand Prix at Brands Hatch; John Watson replaced him for that race. He did manage fourth at the San Marino Grand Prix, 5th at the German Grand Prix, and a single race win at the Dutch Grand Prix where he held off a fast-finishing Prost late in the race. This proved to be his last Grand Prix victory, as after announcing his impending retirement at the 1985 Austrian Grand Prix, he retired for good at the end of that season.

Lauda's final Formula One Grand Prix drive was the inaugural Australian Grand Prix in Adelaide, South Australia. After qualifying 16th, a steady drive saw him leading by lap 53. The McLaren's ceramic brakes suffered on the street circuit and he crashed out of the lead at the end of the long Brabham Straight on lap 57 when his brakes finally failed. He was one of only two drivers in the race who had driven in the non-championship 1984 Australian Grand Prix, the other being 1982 World Champion Keke Rosberg, who won in Adelaide in 1985 and took Lauda's place at McLaren in 1986.

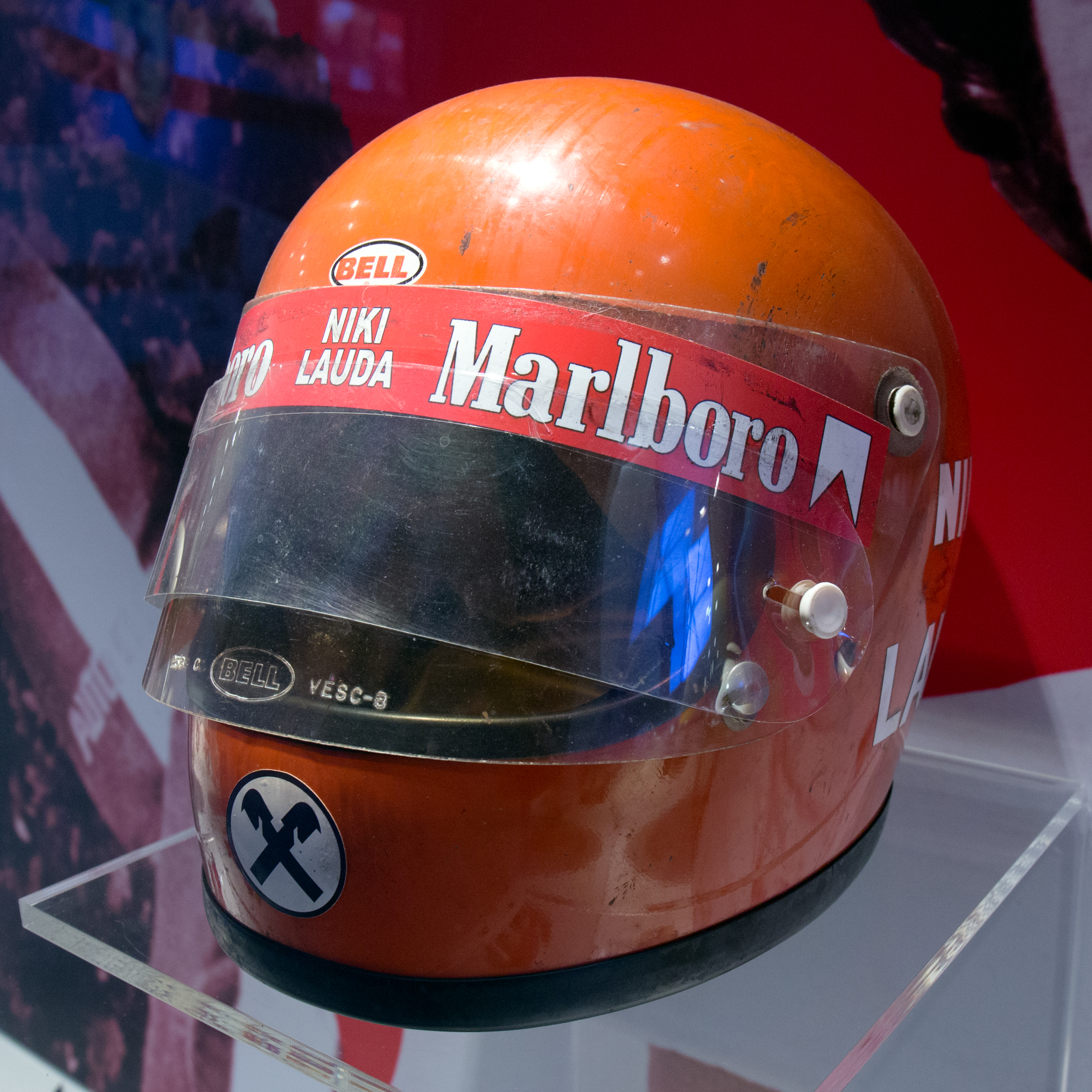
Lauda's helmet from the 1970s, at the Museo Ferrari in Maranello

=== Helmet ===
Lauda's helmet was originally painted plain red with his full name written on both sides and the Raiffeisen Bank logo in the chin area. He wore a modified AGV helmet in the weeks following his Nürburgring accident so as the lining would not aggravate his burned scalp too badly. In 1982, upon his return to McLaren, his helmet was white and featured the red "L" logo of Lauda Air instead of his name on both sides, complete with branding from his personal sponsor Parmalat on the top. From 1983 to 1985, the red and white were reversed to evoke memories of his earlier helmet design.

== Later management roles ==
In 1993, Lauda returned to Formula One in a managerial position when Luca di Montezemolo offered him a consulting role at Ferrari. Halfway through the 2001 season, Lauda assumed the role of team principal of the Jaguar Formula One team. The team failed to improve and Lauda was made redundant, together with 70 other key figures, at the end of 2002.

In September 2012, Lauda was appointed non-executive chairman of the Mercedes-AMG Petronas Motorsport. He took part in negotiations to sign Lewis Hamilton to a three-year deal with Mercedes in 2013. He remained at Mercedes until his death in 2019, winning six World Constructors' Championships with the team.

== Roles beyond Formula One ==
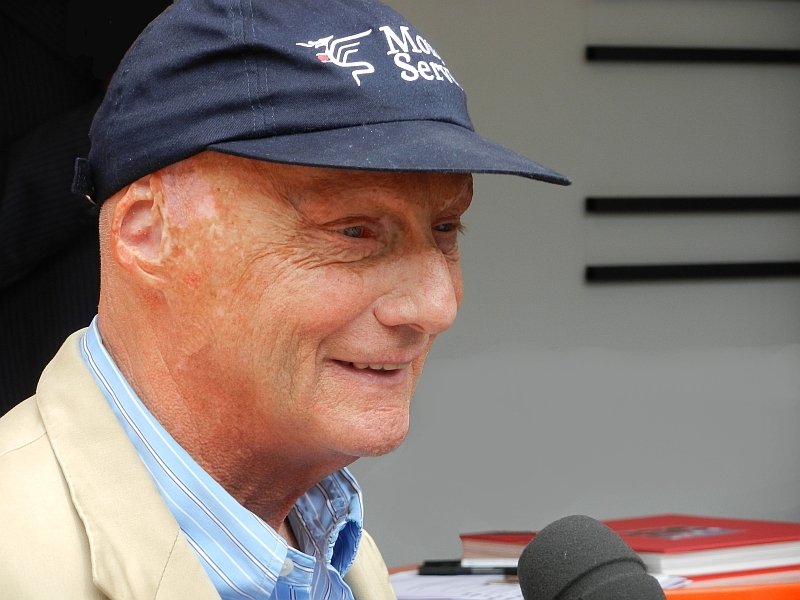
Lauda in 2011

In 1985, Lauda returned to running his airline, Lauda Air, on his second Formula One retirement. During his time as airline manager, he was appointed consultant at Ferrari as part of an effort by Montezemolo to rejuvenate the team. After selling his Lauda Air shares to majority partner Austrian Airlines in 1999, he managed the Jaguar Formula One racing team from 2001 to 2002.

In late 2003, he started a new airline, Niki. Similar to Lauda Air, Niki merged with its major partner Air Berlin in 2011. In early 2016, Lauda took over chartered airline Amira Air and renamed the company LaudaMotion. As a result of Air Berlin's insolvency in 2017, LaudaMotion took over the Niki brand and asset after an unsuccessful bid by Lufthansa and IAG. Lauda held an airline transport pilot's licence and from time to time acted as a captain on the flights of his airline.

Lauda was inducted into the International Motorsports Hall of Fame in 1993 and from 1996 provided commentary on Grands Prix for Austrian and German television on RTL. In May 2010, he was criticized for calling Robert Kubica a "polack", an ethnic slur for Polish people, on air at the Monaco Grand Prix.

Lauda is sometimes known by the nickname "the Rat", "SuperRat" or "King Rat" because of his prominent buck teeth. He was associated with both Parmalat and Viessmann, sponsoring the ever-present cap he wore from 1976 to hide the severe burns he sustained in his Nürburgring accident. Lauda said in a 2009 interview with the German newspaper Die Zeit that an advertiser was paying €1.2 million for the space on his red cap.

In 2005, the Austrian post office issued a stamp honouring him. In 2008, American sports television network ESPN ranked him 22nd on their "top drivers of all-time" list.

Lauda wrote five books: The Art and Science of Grand Prix Driving (titled Formula 1: The Art and Technicalities of Grand Prix Driving in some markets) (1975); My Years With Ferrari (1978); The New Formula One: A Turbo Age (1984); Meine Story (titled To Hell and Back in some markets) (1986); Das dritte Leben (en. The third life) (1996). Lauda credited Austrian journalist Herbert Volker with editing the books.

== In popular culture ==
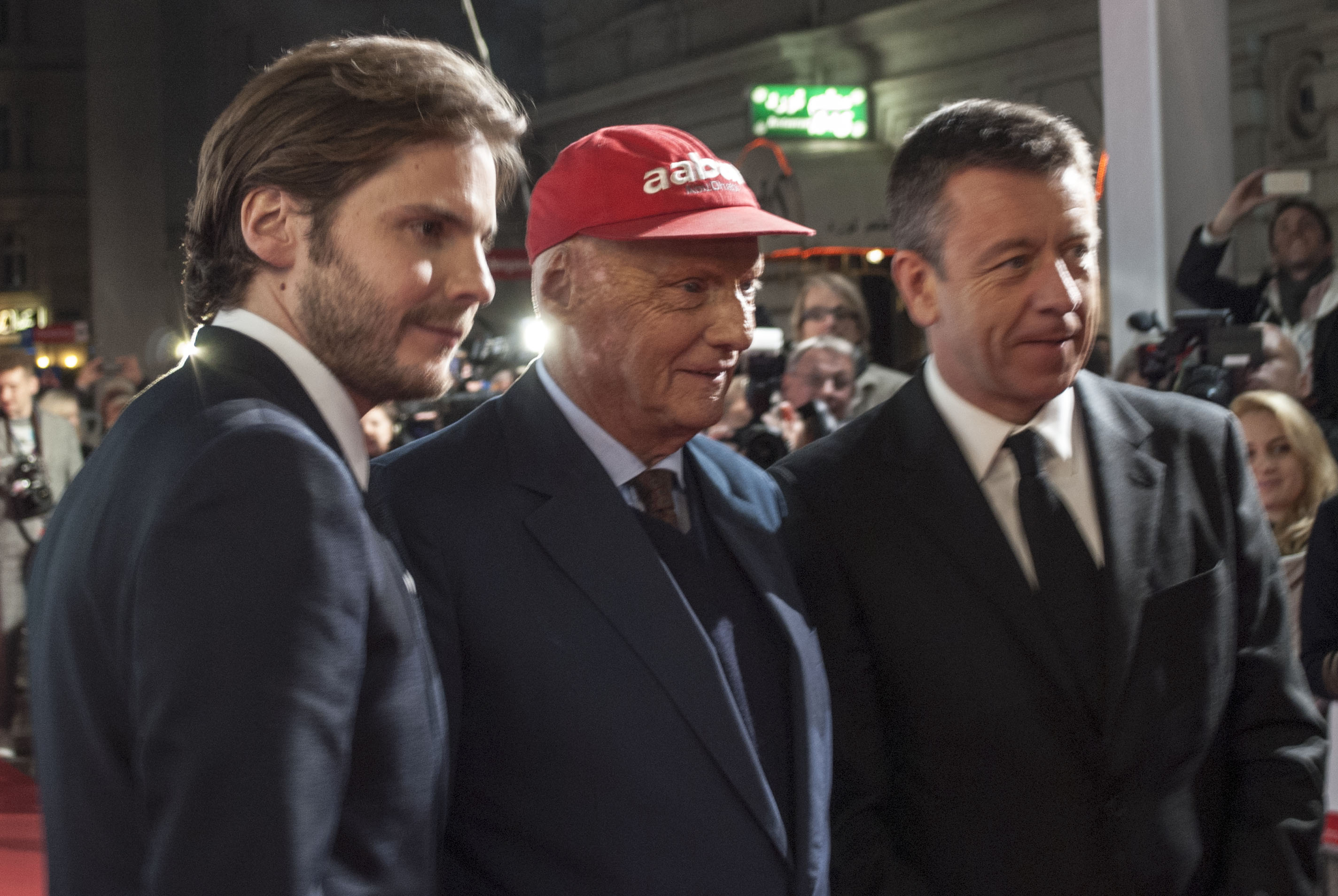
Daniel Brühl, Lauda and Peter Morgan at the premiere of Rush in Vienna, Austria in 2013

The 1976 battle between Lauda and James Hunt was dramatized in the film Rush (2013), where Lauda was played by Daniel Brühl—a portrayal that was nominated for a BAFTA Film Award as well as a Golden Globe. Lauda made a cameo appearance at the end of the film. Lauda said of Hunt's death, "When I heard he'd died age 45 of a heart attack I wasn't surprised, I was just sad." He also said that Hunt was one of the very few people he liked, one of a smaller number of people he respected, and the only person he had envied.

Lauda appeared in an episode of Mayday titled "Niki Lauda: Testing the Limits" regarding the events of Lauda Air Flight 004, and described running an airline as more difficult than winning three Formula 1 championships.

In the 2024 Netflix miniseries Senna, based on the life and career of Ayrton Senna, Lauda is portrayed by German actor Johannes Heinrichs.

The character Nick Lambda in the 1977 racing anime Arrow Emblem: Hawk of the Grand Prix is clearly based on Lauda.

== Personal life ==
Lauda dated Mariella von Reininghaus from 1968 to 1975. In 1976, he married the Chilean-Austrian Marlene Knaus. They divorced in 1991. Lauda and Knaus had two sons, Mathias, a racing driver, and Lukas, who acted as Mathias's manager. In 1992, Lauda briefly dated racing driver Giovanna Amati.

In 2008, he married Birgit Wetzinger, a flight attendant for his airline. In 2005, Wetzinger donated a kidney to Lauda after the kidney he received from his brother in 1997 failed. In September 2009, Birgit gave birth to twins, Max and Mia.

Lauda spoke fluent German, English, and Italian.

Lauda came from a Catholic family. In a 2014 interview with Zeit he stated that he left the church for a time to avoid paying church taxes, but went back when he had his two children baptised.

== Death and legacy ==
On 20 May 2019, Lauda died in his sleep aged 70 at the University Hospital of Zürich where he had been undergoing kidney dialysis. He had experienced a period of ill health exacerbated by his lung injuries from the 1976 accident. He had a double lung transplant the previous year and kidney transplants in 1997 and 2005.

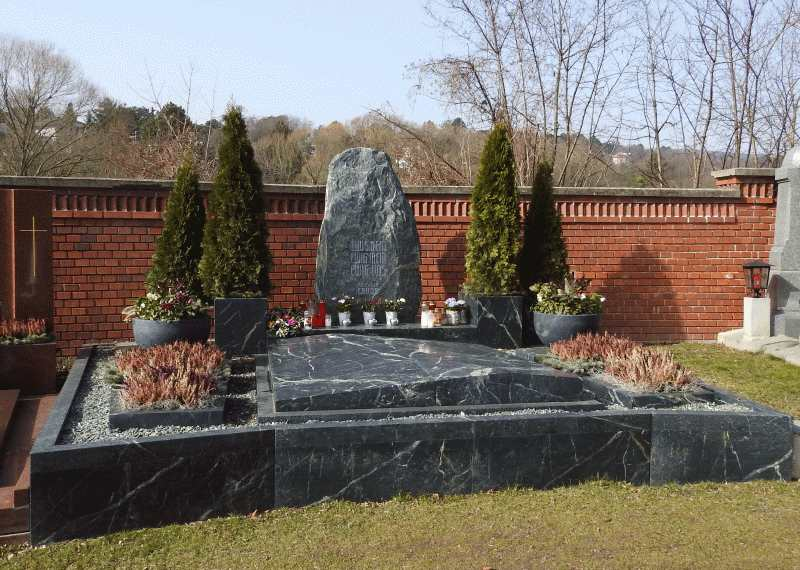
Lauda's grave in Vienna

At the 2019 Monaco Grand Prix, current and former drivers and teams paid tributes on social media and during the pre-race Wednesday press conference. A moment of silence was held before the race. Throughout the weekend, fans and drivers wore red caps in his honour, with the Mercedes team painting their halo device red with the message "Niki we miss you" instead of their usual silver scheme. The Haas VF-19's shark-fin engine cover was painted red with Lauda's name and the years of his birth and death. Lewis Hamilton and Sebastian Vettel wore helmets in Lauda's honour, and when Hamilton won the race he dedicated it to Lauda.

Lauda's funeral at St. Stephen's Cathedral in Vienna was attended by prominent Formula One figures, including Gerhard Berger, Toto Wolff, Jackie Stewart, former FIA president Jean Todt, Alain Prost, Nelson Piquet, Jean Alesi, Lewis Hamilton, David Coulthard, Nico Rosberg, Valtteri Bottas, René and Hans Binder, and René Rast. Arnold Schwarzenegger and Austrian politicians, including Alexander Van der Bellen, also attended. In accordance with his wishes, Lauda was buried in Heiligenstädter Friedhof, wearing the Ferrari racing suit he wore from 1974 to 1977.

== Racing record ==
=== Career summary ===
| Season | Series | Team | Races | Wins | Poles | F/Laps | Podiums | Points | Position |
|---|---|---|---|---|---|---|---|---|---|
| 1970 | World Sportscar Championship | Bosch Wien | 1 | 0 | 0 | 0 | 0 | 1 | NC |
| 1970 | Interserie | Bosch Racing Team | 4 | 0 | 0 | 0 | 0 | 6 | 15th |
| 1971 | European Formula Two | March Engineering | 9 | 0 | 0 | 0 | 0 | 8 | 10th |
| 1971 | Formula One | STP March Racing Team | 1 | 0 | 0 | 0 | 0 | 0 | NC |
| 1972 | European Formula Two | March Engineering | 11 | 0 | 2 | 0 | 3 | 25 | 5th |
| 1972 | Formula One | STP March Racing Team | 12 | 0 | 0 | 0 | 0 | 0 | NC |
| 1972 | British Formula Two | March Engineering | 4 | 1 | 0 | 1 | 4 | 31 | **1st** |
| 1973 | Formula One | Marlboro-BRM | 14 | 0 | 0 | 0 | 0 | 2 | 17th |
| 1973 | European Touring Car Championship | BMW Alpina | 1 | 1 | 1 | 0 | 1 | 32 | 7th |
| 1973 | World Sportscar Championship | BMW Alpina | 1 | 0 | 0 | 0 | 0 | 0 | NC |
| 1974 | Formula One | SEFAC Ferrari | 15 | 2 | 9 | 3 | 5 | 38 | 4th |
| 1974 | World Sportscar Championship | Ford Köln | 1 | 0 | 0 | 0 | 0 | 0 | NC |
| 1975 | Formula One | SEFAC Ferrari | 14 | 5 | 9 | 2 | 8 | 64.5 | **1st** |
| 1976 | Formula One | SEFAC Ferrari | 14 | 5 | 3 | 4 | 9 | 68 | **2nd** |
| 1977 | Formula One | SEFAC Ferrari | 14 | 3 | 2 | 3 | 10 | 72 | **1st** |
| 1978 | Formula One | Parmalat Racing | 16 | 2 | 1 | 4 | 7 | 44 | 4th |
| 1979 | Formula One | Parmalat Racing | 13 | 0 | 0 | 0 | 0 | 4 | 14th |
| 1979 | BMW M1 Procar Championship | Project Four Racing | 8 | 3 | 1 | 3 | 4 | 78 | **1st** |
| 1982 | Formula One | Marlboro McLaren International | 14 | 2 | 0 | 1 | 3 | 30 | 5th |
| 1983 | Formula One | Marlboro McLaren International Team | 15 | 0 | 0 | 1 | 2 | 12 | 10th |
| 1984 | Formula One | Marlboro McLaren TAG Turbo | 16 | 5 | 0 | 5 | 9 | 72 | **1st** |
| 1985 | Formula One | Marlboro McLaren TAG Turbo | 14 | 1 | 0 | 1 | 1 | 14 | 10th |

=== Complete European Formula Two Championship results ===
(key) (Races in bold indicate pole position; races in italics indicate fastest lap.)

| Year | Entrant | Chassis | Engine | 1 | 2 | 3 | 4 | 5 | 6 | 7 | 8 | 9 | 10 | 11 | 12 | 13 | 14 | Pos. | Pts |
|---|---|---|---|---|---|---|---|---|---|---|---|---|---|---|---|---|---|---|---|
| 1971 | March Engineering | March 712M | Cosworth FVA | HOC; Ret | THR; 10 | NÜR; 6 | JAR; 7 | PAL; DNQ | ROU; 4 | MAN; Ret | TUL; Ret | ALB; Ret | VLL; 7 | VLL | | | | 10th | 8 |
| 1972 | March Engineering | March 722 | Ford BDA | MAL; 2 | THR; 3 | **HOC**; Ret | PAU; Ret | PAL; DNQ | **HOC**; Ret | ROU; Ret | ÖST; Ret | IMO; 3 | MAN; Ret | PER | SAL; 6 | ALB | HOC; 9 | 5th | 25 |

=== Complete British Formula Two results ===
(key) (Races in bold indicate pole position; races in italics indicate fastest lap.)

| Year | Entrant | Chassis | Engine | 1 | 2 | 3 | 4 | 5 | Pos. | Pts |
|---|---|---|---|---|---|---|---|---|---|---|
| 1972 | March Engineering | March 722 | Ford BDA | MAL; 2 | OUL; 1 | THR; 3 | CRY | OUL; 2 | **1st** | **31** |

=== Complete Formula One World Championship results ===
(key) (Races in bold indicate pole position; races in italics indicate fastest lap.)

| Year | Entrant | Chassis | Engine | 1 | 2 | 3 | 4 | 5 | 6 | 7 | 8 | 9 | 10 | 11 | 12 | 13 | 14 | 15 | 16 | 17 | WDC | Pts |
|---|---|---|---|---|---|---|---|---|---|---|---|---|---|---|---|---|---|---|---|---|---|---|
| 1971 | STP March Racing Team | March 711 | Ford Cosworth DFV 3.0 V8 | RSA | ESP | MON | NED | FRA | GBR | GER | AUT; Ret | ITA | CAN | USA | | | | | | | NC | 0 |
| 1972 | STP March Racing Team | March 721 | Ford Cosworth DFV 3.0 V8 | ARG; 11 | RSA; 7 | | | | | | | | | | | | | | | | NC | 0 |
| 1972 | STP March Racing Team | March 721X | Ford Cosworth DFV 3.0 V8 | | | ESP; Ret | MON; 16 | BEL; 12 | | | | | | | | | | | | | NC | 0 |
| 1972 | STP March Racing Team | March 721G | Ford Cosworth DFV 3.0 V8 | | | | | | FRA; Ret | GBR; 9 | GER; Ret | AUT; 10 | ITA; 13 | CAN; DSQ | USA; NC | | | | | | NC | 0 |
| 1973 | Marlboro-BRM | BRM P160C | BRM P142 3.0 V12 | ARG; Ret | BRA; 8 | | | | | | | | | | | | | | | | 17th | 2 |
| 1973 | Marlboro-BRM | BRM P160D | BRM P142 3.0 V12 | | | RSA; Ret | | | | | | | | | | | | | | | 17th | 2 |
| 1973 | Marlboro-BRM | BRM P160E | BRM P142 3.0 V12 | | | | ESP; Ret | BEL; 5 | MON; Ret | SWE; 13 | FRA; 9 | GBR; 12 | NED; Ret | GER; Ret | AUT; DNS | ITA; Ret | CAN; Ret | USA; Ret | | | 17th | 2 |
| 1974 | SEFAC Ferrari | Ferrari 312B3 | Ferrari 001/11 3.0 F12 | ARG; 2 | BRA; Ret | **RSA**; 16 | **ESP**; 1 | BEL; 2 | **MON**; Ret | SWE; Ret | **NED**; 1 | **FRA**; 2 | **GBR**; 5 | **GER**; Ret | **AUT**; Ret | **ITA**; Ret | CAN; Ret | USA; Ret | | | 4th | 38 |
| 1975 | SEFAC Ferrari | Ferrari 312B3 | Ferrari 001/11 3.0 F12 | ARG; 6 | BRA; 5 | | | | | | | | | | | | | | | | **1st** | **64.5** |
| 1975 | SEFAC Ferrari | Ferrari 312T | Ferrari 015 3.0 F12 | | | RSA; 5 | **ESP**; Ret | **MON**; 1 | **BEL**; 1 | SWE; 1 | **NED**; 2 | **FRA**; 1 | GBR; 8 | **GER**; 3 | **AUT**; 6 | **ITA**; 3 | **USA**; 1 | | | | **1st** | **64.5** |
| 1976 | SEFAC Ferrari | Ferrari 312T | Ferrari 015 3.0 F12 | BRA; 1 | RSA; 1 | USW; 2 | | | | | | | | | | | | | | | **2nd** | **68** |
| 1976 | SEFAC Ferrari | Ferrari 312T2 | Ferrari 015 3.0 F12 | | | | ESP; 2 | **BEL**; 1 | **MON**; 1 | SWE; 3 | FRA; Ret | **GBR**; 1 | GER; Ret | AUT | NED | ITA; 4 | CAN; 8 | USA; 3 | JPN; Ret | | **2nd** | **68** |
| 1977 | SEFAC Ferrari | Ferrari 312T2 | Ferrari 015 3.0 F12 | ARG; Ret | BRA; 3 | RSA; 1 | **USW**; 2 | ESP; DNS | MON; 2 | BEL; 2 | SWE; Ret | FRA; 5 | GBR; 2 | GER; 1 | **AUT**; 2 | NED; 1 | ITA; 2 | USA; 4 | CAN | JPN | **1st** | **72** |
| 1978 | Parmalat Racing | Brabham BT45C | Alfa Romeo 115-12 3.0 F12 | ARG; 2 | BRA; 3 | | | | | | | | | | | | | | | | 4th | 44 |
| 1978 | Parmalat Racing | Brabham BT46 | Alfa Romeo 115-12 3.0 F12 | | | **RSA**; Ret | USW; Ret | MON; 2 | BEL; Ret | ESP; Ret | | FRA; Ret | GBR; 2 | GER; Ret | AUT; Ret | NED; 3 | ITA; 1 | USA; Ret | CAN; Ret | | 4th | 44 |
| 1978 | Parmalat Racing | Brabham BT46B | Alfa Romeo 115-12 3.0 F12 | | | | | | | | SWE; 1 | | | | | | | | | | 4th | 44 |
| 1979 | Parmalat Racing | Brabham BT48 | Alfa Romeo 1260 3.0 V12 | ARG; Ret | BRA; Ret | RSA; 6 | USW; Ret | ESP; Ret | BEL; Ret | MON; Ret | FRA; Ret | GBR; Ret | GER; Ret | AUT; Ret | NED; Ret | ITA; 4 | | | | | 14th | 4 |
| 1979 | Parmalat Racing | Brabham BT49 | Ford Cosworth DFV 3.0 V8 | | | | | | | | | | | | | | CAN; WD | USA | | | 14th | 4 |
| 1982 | Marlboro McLaren International | McLaren MP4B | Ford Cosworth DFV 3.0 V8 | RSA; 4 | BRA; Ret | USW; 1 | SMR | BEL; DSQ | MON; Ret | DET; Ret | CAN; Ret | NED; 4 | GBR; 1 | FRA; 8 | GER; DNS | AUT; 5 | SUI; 3 | ITA; Ret | CPL; Ret | | 5th | 30 |
| 1983 | Marlboro McLaren International Team | McLaren MP4/1C | Ford Cosworth DFV 3.0 V8 | BRA; 3 | USW; 2 | | | | | | | | | | | | | | | | 10th | 12 |
| 1983 | Marlboro McLaren International Team | McLaren MP4/1C | Ford Cosworth DFY 3.0 V8 | | | FRA; Ret | SMR; Ret | MON; DNQ | BEL; Ret | DET; Ret | CAN; Ret | GBR; 6 | GER; DSQ | AUT; 6 | | | | | | | 10th | 12 |
| 1983 | Marlboro McLaren International Team | McLaren MP4/1E | TAG TTE PO1 1.5 V6 t | | | | | | | | | | | | NED; Ret | ITA; Ret | EUR; Ret | RSA; 11 | | | 10th | 12 |
| 1984 | Marlboro McLaren TAG Turbo | McLaren MP4/2 | TAG TTE PO1 1.5 V6 t | BRA; Ret | RSA; 1 | BEL; Ret | SMR; Ret | FRA; 1 | MON; Ret | CAN; 2 | DET; Ret | DAL; Ret | GBR; 1 | GER; 2 | AUT; 1 | NED; 2 | ITA; 1 | EUR; 4 | POR; 2 | | **1st** | **72** |
| 1985 | Marlboro McLaren TAG Turbo | McLaren MP4/2B | TAG TTE PO1 1.5 V6 t | BRA; Ret | POR; Ret | SMR; 4 | MON; Ret | CAN; Ret | DET; Ret | FRA; Ret | GBR; Ret | GER; 5 | AUT; Ret | NED; 1 | ITA; Ret | BEL; DNS | EUR | RSA; Ret | AUS; Ret | | 10th | 14 |

=== Complete Formula One non-championship results ===
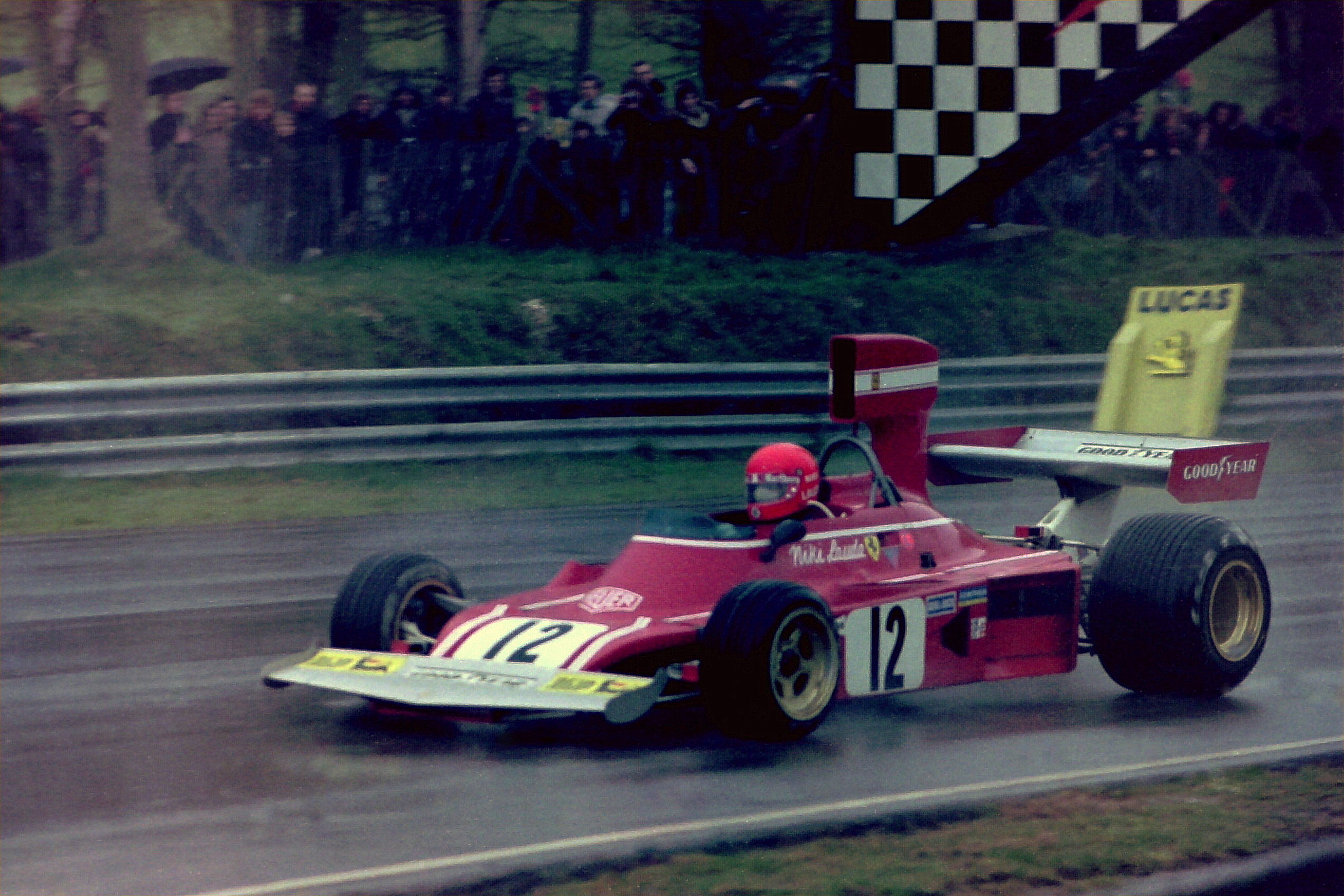
Lauda at the 1974 Race of Champions

(key) (Races in bold indicate pole position; races in italics indicate fastest lap.)

| Year | Entrant | Chassis | Engine | 1 | 2 | 3 | 4 | 5 | 6 |
|---|---|---|---|---|---|---|---|---|---|
| 1972 | STP March Racing Team | March 721 | Ford Cosworth DFV 3.0 V8 | ROC | BRA | INT | OUL | REP; DNS | VIC |
| 1973 | Marlboro-BRM | BRM P160D | BRM P142 3.0 V12 | ROC; Ret | INT; 5 | | | | |
| 1974 | SEFAC Ferrari | Ferrari 312B3 | Ferrari 001/11 3.0 F12 | PRE | ROC; 2 | INT | | | |
| 1975 | SEFAC Ferrari | Ferrari 312T | Ferrari 015 3.0 F12 | ROC | INT; 1 | SUI | | | |
| 1976 | SEFAC Ferrari | Ferrari 312T2 | Ferrari 015 3.0 F12 | ROC; Ret | INT | | | | |
| 1978 | Parmalat Racing | Brabham BT45C | Alfa Romeo 115-12 3.0 F12 | INT; DNS | | | | | |
| 1979 | Parmalat Racing | Brabham BT48 | Alfa Romeo 1260 3.0 V12 | ROC; 5 | GNM | DIN; 1 | | | |

=== Complete BMW M1 Procar Championship results ===
(key) (Races in bold indicate pole position; races in italics indicate fastest lap.)

| Year | Entrant | 1 | 2 | 3 | 4 | 5 | 6 | 7 | 8 | DC | Pts |
|---|---|---|---|---|---|---|---|---|---|---|---|
| 1979 | BMW Motorsport | ZOL; Ret | **MCO**; 1 | DIJ; 8 | SIL; 1 | HOC; 1 | ÖST; Ret | ZAN; Ret | MNZ; 2 | 1st | 78 |

=== Other race results ===
- Nürburgring 24 Hours: 1st, 1973
- 1,000 km of Spa Francorchamps: 1st, 1973
- 4 hours of Monza: 1st, 1973
- 4 hours of Zandvoort: 1st,1974, 3rd, 1972
- Diepholz SRP/GT: 1st, 1970
- 6 hours of Nurbugring: 2nd, 1971
- 9 hours of Kyalami: 3rd, 1972
- Taurenpokal Salzburgring: 1st, 1971
- Nurburgring Inaugural Saloon Car Race: 2nd, 1984

== Books ==
- Lauda, Niki. Technik und Praxis des Grand-Prix-Sports (in German). Stuttgart; Vienna: Stuttgart Motorbuch-Verlag; Orac.
  - Lauda, Niki (1977). The Art and Science of Grand Prix Driving (a.k.a. Formula 1: The Art and Technicalities of Grand Prix Driving). Translated by Irving, David. Osceola, Wis.: Motorbooks International. ISBN 9780879380496. OCLC 483675371.
- Lauda, Niki (1977). Protokoll: meine Jahre mit Ferrari. Stuttgard; Vienna: Stuttgart Motorbuch-Verlag; Orac. ISBN 9783853688434. OCLC 3869352.
  - Lauda, Niki (1978). My Years with Ferrari. Osceola, Wis.: Motorbooks International. ISBN 9780879380595. OCLC 3842607. AKA For the Record: My Years with Ferrari (British edition).
- Lauda, Niki (1982). Die neue Formel 1. Stuttgart; Vienna: Stuttgart Motorbuch-Verlag; Orac. ISBN 9783853689103. OCLC 1072406853.
  - Lauda, Niki (1984). The New Formula One: A Turbo Age. Osceola, Wis.: Motorbooks International. ISBN 9780879381790. OCLC 10456956.
- Lauda, Niki; Völker, Herbert (1985). Niki Lauda: Meine Story. Stuttgard; Vienna: Stuttgart Motorbuch-Verlag; Orac. ISBN 9783701500253. OCLC 38110109.
  - Lauda, Niki; Völker, Herbert (1986). To Hell and Back: An Autobiography. Translated by Crockett, E. J. London: Stanley Paul. ISBN 9780091642402. OCLC 476752274.
- Lauda, Niki (1996). Das dritte Leben. Munich: Heyne. ISBN 9783453115729. OCLC 40286522.

== See also ==
- Formula One drivers from Austria
- Hunt–Lauda rivalry
- Lauda Air Italy
- Sport in Austria

== Bibliography ==
- Folley, Malcolm (2009). Senna Versus Prost. Random House. ISBN 978-1-84605-540-9.
- Lang, Mike (1981). Grand Prix!. Sparkford, Yeovil, Somerset : Newbury Park, Calif., USA: Haynes Pub. Group. ISBN 978-0-85429-380-3.
- Lauda, Niki; Völker, Herbert (1986). To Hell and Back. London: Vintage. ISBN 978-0-09-164240-2.
- Rubython, Tom (31 October 2011). In the Name of Glory. Myrtle. ISBN 978-0-9565656-9-3. OCLC 757931377.
- Zapelloni, Umberto; Comte, Michel (2004). Formula Ferrari. Hodder & Stoughton. ISBN 0-340-83471-4.

Sporting positions
| Preceded by James Hunt | BRDC International Trophy; Winner; 1975 | Succeeded by James Hunt |
| Preceded by Emerson Fittipaldi | Formula One World Champion; 1975 | Succeeded by James Hunt |
| Preceded by James Hunt | Formula One World Champion; 1977 | Succeeded by Mario Andretti |
| Preceded by Inaugural | BMW M1 Procar Championship; Champion; 1979 | Succeeded by Nelson Piquet |
| Preceded by Nelson Piquet | Formula One World Champion; 1984 | Succeeded by Alain Prost |
Awards and achievements
| Preceded by Nadia Comăneci | BBC Overseas Sports Personality of the Year; 1977 | Succeeded by Muhammad Ali |
| Preceded by Nelson Piquet | Autosport; International Racing Driver Award; 1984 | Succeeded by Alain Prost |
| Preceded by Lewis Hamilton | FIA Personality of the Year; 2019 | Succeeded by Lewis Hamilton |
