= Hans Pretterebner =

Austrian politician (1944–2024)

Member of the National Council of Austria
- In office 7 November 1994 – 28 September 1995

Personal details
- Born: 8 April 1944 Haselsdorf-Tobelbad, Reichsgau Steiermark, Germany
- Died: 12 October 2024 (aged 80) Vienna, Austria
- Party: FPÖ
- Occupation: Journalist

Hans Pretterebner (8 April 1944 – 12 October 2024) was an Austrian journalist and politician. A member of the Freedom Party, he served in the National Council from 1994 to 1995.

He helped uncover the Lucona scandal that occupied Austrian politics from the late 1970s to the early 1990s.

Pretterebner died in Vienna on 12 October 2024, at the age of 80.
