= Wiesensee (Tirol) =

Lake in Austria

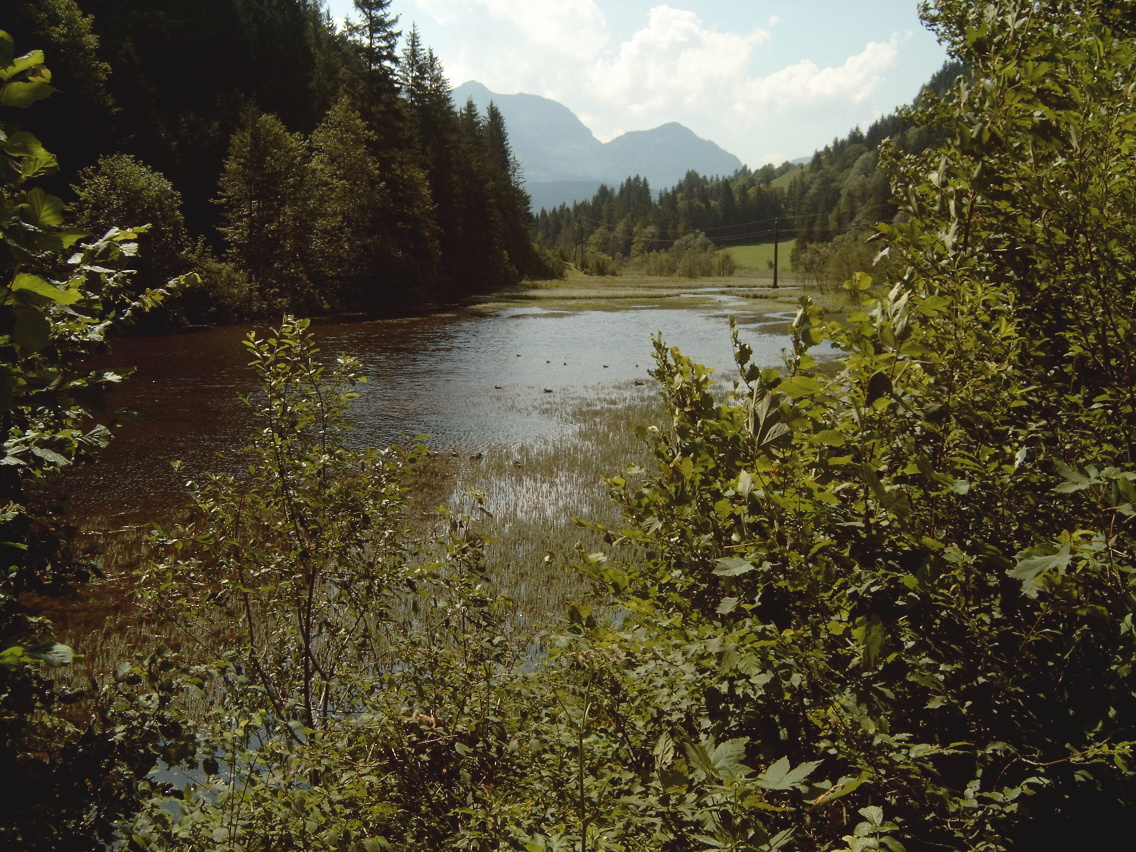
- Northwestern shore, view to the south

- Location within Tyrol, Austria
- Location: Tyrol, Austria
- Coordinates: 47.4966°N 12.6085°E
- Part of: Danube basin
- Primary outflows: Katzelbach→Grieslbach →Loferbach→Saalach →Salzach→Inn →Danube→Black Sea
- Max. length: 220 metres (720 ft)
- Surface elevation: 927 metres (3,041 ft)

Wiesensee (German pronunciation: [ˈviːzənzeː]) is a small lake in the northwest corner of the Hochfilzen municipality of Tyrol, Austria.

== Location ==
It lies between Pillersee and Hochfilzen in Austria, near the village of Unterwarming. It gives its name to the Wiesenseetal (Wiesensee Valley).

== Hydrology ==
Wiesensee is fed from the south and drained to the north by the Katzelbach stream. It is close to the source of the Katzelbach and 1.7 kilometres (1.1 mi) from the valley watershed separating that stream from the Dunkelbach river, however both ultimately progress to the Inn river and then to the Danube. The lake is gradually silting up and the southern end has become a reed bed.

== Amenities ==
Alongside Wiesensee are the Klettergarten Wiesensee (Rock Climbing Area), with 25 climbing routes, and the Kneipp water therapy trail.
