= Gerald Freihofner =

Austrian journalist (1946–2019)

Gerald Freihofner (30 July 1946 – 21 October 2019) was an Austrian journalist. Born in Steyr, Upper Austria, between 1974 and 1990, he was managing editor of the domestic political section of the Wochenpresse (renamed to the Wirtschaftswoche in 1991). His reports in many title stories regarding the Lucona contributed to the resignation of two government ministers. Between 1995 and 2000, he was a guest professor at the Danube University Krems (EJA – Europäische Journalismus Akademie). He led the Friedrich Funder Institute for journalist education and media research. He was also active as an independent journalist in Vienna and Lower Austria.
