= Wochenpresse =

Wochenpresse was an Austrian weekly periodical founded by Fritz Molden soon after World War II as a subsidiary of the daily newspaper Die Presse. In 1955 it became an independent publication, in 1993 it was taken over by the German economic weekly Wirtschaftswoche and continued publication as Austrian edition. In 1996 the magazine folded.

Well known editors include Hubertus Czernin, Klaus Khittl, Peter Michael Lingens, Lucian O. Meysels, Duglore Pizzini und Rudolph J. Wojta. Gerald Freihofner was the deputy editor-in-chief of Wochenpresse between 1982 and 1991.

== See also ==
- List of magazines in Austria
