= Heiligenstädter Friedhof =

Cemetery in Vienna, Austria

Coordinates: 48°15′37″N 16°20′48″E

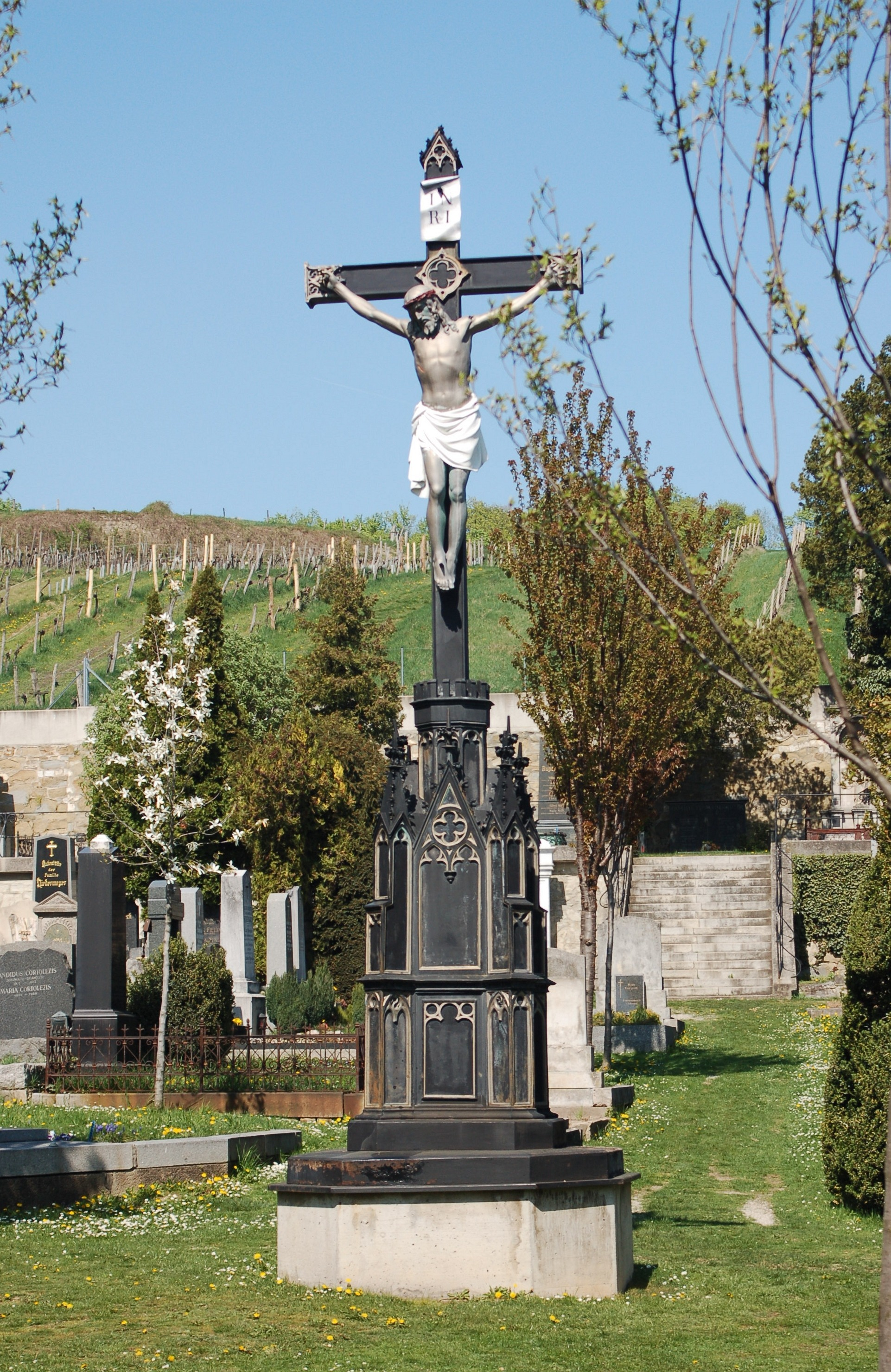
Monument at the cemetery

Heiligenstädter Friedhof is a cemetery in Döbling, the 19th district of Vienna, Austria.

It is named after the Heiligenstadt neighbourhood (municipality) of Döbling. The cemetery is among the oldest of the Austrian capital, with an ossuary existing at the site from approx. 1500 and the first walls around the yard being erected in 1831. It comprises an area of 20,315 square metres, with 13,000 grave sites.

== Famous people ==
Among the famous people buried at Heiligenstädter Friedhof are:

- Walter Berry (1929–2000), Austrian opera singer
- Ödön von Horváth (1901–1938), Austro-Hungarian writer
- Udo Proksch (1934–2001), Austrian insurance fraudster
- Niki Lauda (1949–2019), Austrian formula one driver
