= Craig T. Mullen =

American deep-sea explorer, notable for his contributions to underwater exploration

Craig T. Mullen (born October 4, 1943) is a deep-sea explorer who is notable for extensive technological and research contributions to the world of underwater exploration.

== Military career ==
Craig Mullen was a Navy diving officer during the Vietnam War and served in the Navy's Deep Submergence Program Office and as the Director of Operations at the Navy's Supervisor of Diving, Salvage and Ocean Engineering. Mullen served two tours in Vietnam, finishing his naval service directing the missing in action search for air crews lost at sea off the coast of Vietnam. He led a team of civilian technicians and divers in searching for remains among the aircraft wreckage located by sonar.

== Professional career ==
In 1974, Mullen joined Alcoa Marine, a subsidiary of the Aluminum Company of America, as the Vice President of Operations. He directed the operations of the company's state-of-art deep ocean research vessel R/V Alcoa Seaprobe, which provided the first photos of the USS Monitor off Cape Hatteras, South Carolina. The Seaprobe, an all-aluminum vessel built specifically for deep ocean research and recovery, had a unique search pod utilizing experimental sonar and state-of-the-art cameras to sweep the ocean floor and transmit sonar and image data to the ship, which was up to three miles above.

In 1980 he was part of a management buy-out that acquired Alcoa's interests in ALCOA Marine, Inc. He initially served as its vice president of operations and later as president and a member of its board of directors.

After the buy-out, ALCOA Marine was renamed Eastport International and became a world leader in deep ocean technology development and operations. Eastport set private sector depth records for successful undersea operations in water depths in excess of 5,000 meters as early as 1991, when the company located the shipwreck Lucona in the deep waters of the Indian Ocean. Eastport was the Navy's choice to support its deep ocean search and recovery needs for over 20 years and played a key role in projects including the recovery of the space shuttle Challenger, the search for Korean Air Lines Flight 007, the recovery of the South African Airways Helderberg SA 182, the recovery of TWA Flight 800, as well as many classified military recoveries.

Under Mullen's guidance, Eastport worked internationally and was selected by foreign governments (South Africa, Austria, Italy, Japan, Korea), Lloyd's of London, and various private parties to locate, document, and recover shipwrecks, aircraft, and space hardware from record-breaking depths in all of the world's oceans. Eastport was also an early leader in the development of robotic technology now used by international telecommunications firms to install and service subsea fiber optic telecommunications/data cables and adapted for theme park usage. Eastport also redesigned and rebuilt the Jaws ride for Universal Studios and later, multiple water placed dinosaur action-animatronics in the Islands of Adventure ride, taking its engineering skills in an entirely new direction.

In 1993 Mullen negotiated a merger between Eastport and Oceaneering International, Inc., a major, publicly traded, international oilfield services company with growing government business, and remained the President of a newly formed subsidiary, Oceaneering Advanced Technologies (OTECH) Group. The new subsidiary contained all of Oceaneering's non-oilfield businesses including US Navy search and recovery, Space Systems, Environmental Services, Marine Construction and Ocean Cable Operations. Mullen led Oceaneering Technologies for over five years, diversifying its business base and growing revenues.

In 1998 Mullen formed Sconset Marine, and was active in assisting technology start-up companies manage business development, raising capital, and guide technology development.

== Research work ==
In 2003 Mullen co-founded the AURORA Trust Foundation to advance the world's understanding of the ocean environment and its submerged cultural heritage. AURORA is active in the Mediterranean, discovering numerous ancient shipwreck sites. In 2004, Mullen co-founded the venture firm HLP-Capital to invest in international business opportunities, primarily in the Mediterranean, in the process also creating two new marine companies, Deep Blue Surveys (engaged in hydrographic surveys) and Deep Blue Ship Charters (active in the luxury yacht industry).

Mullen has traveled and published widely, and has worked in most of the counties bordering the Mediterranean Sea from Lebanon to Spain. He is at ease working at the executive and high levels of government.

== Professional affiliations ==
Mullen is a Fellow of the Explorers Club and has carried five Explorers Club expedition flags on major ocean expeditions to Malta, Ventotene, Syracuse Sicily, Hvar Croatia and the Florida Keys.

He is on the Board of Directors for the Marine Resources Development Foundation.
