= Karl Lütgendorf =

Austrian politician (1914–1981)

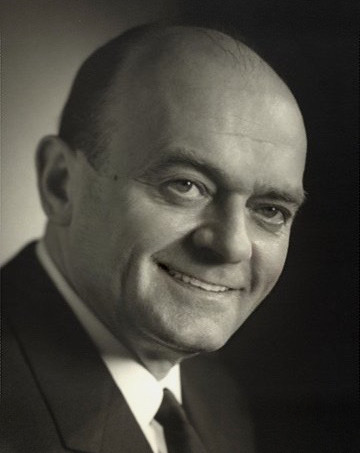
Karl Lütgendorf

Karl Ferdinand Lütgendorf, born Karl Ferdinand Freiherr von Lütgendorf (15 October 1914 – 9 October 1981) was an Austrian soldier and politician who served as the Defense Minister of Austria from 1971 to 1977. He died in 1981, in an apparent suicide, after the discovery of his part in the Lucona affair.

He was a descendant of the air pioneer Joseph Maximilian Freiherr von Lütgendorf.
