= Marie Proksch =

Czech pianist, music educator and composer

Marie Proksch (1836 – 17 May 1900) was a Bohemian pianist, music educator and composer.

== Biography ==
Marie Proksch was the daughter of blind pianist Josef Proksch (1794–1864) who also taught music to Bedřich Smetana. Proksch was born in Prague, where she studied music under her father.

She went on a concert tour in 1856/57, which included a several-month stay in Paris, and became known as a concert pianist.

After the death of her father in 1864, she took control with her brother Theodore Proksch of her father's Musikbildungsanstalt Institute (a music school founded in 1830) in Prague.

After her brother died in 1876, she began composing pieces for piano.
