= Josef Proksch =

Bohemian-German pianist and composer

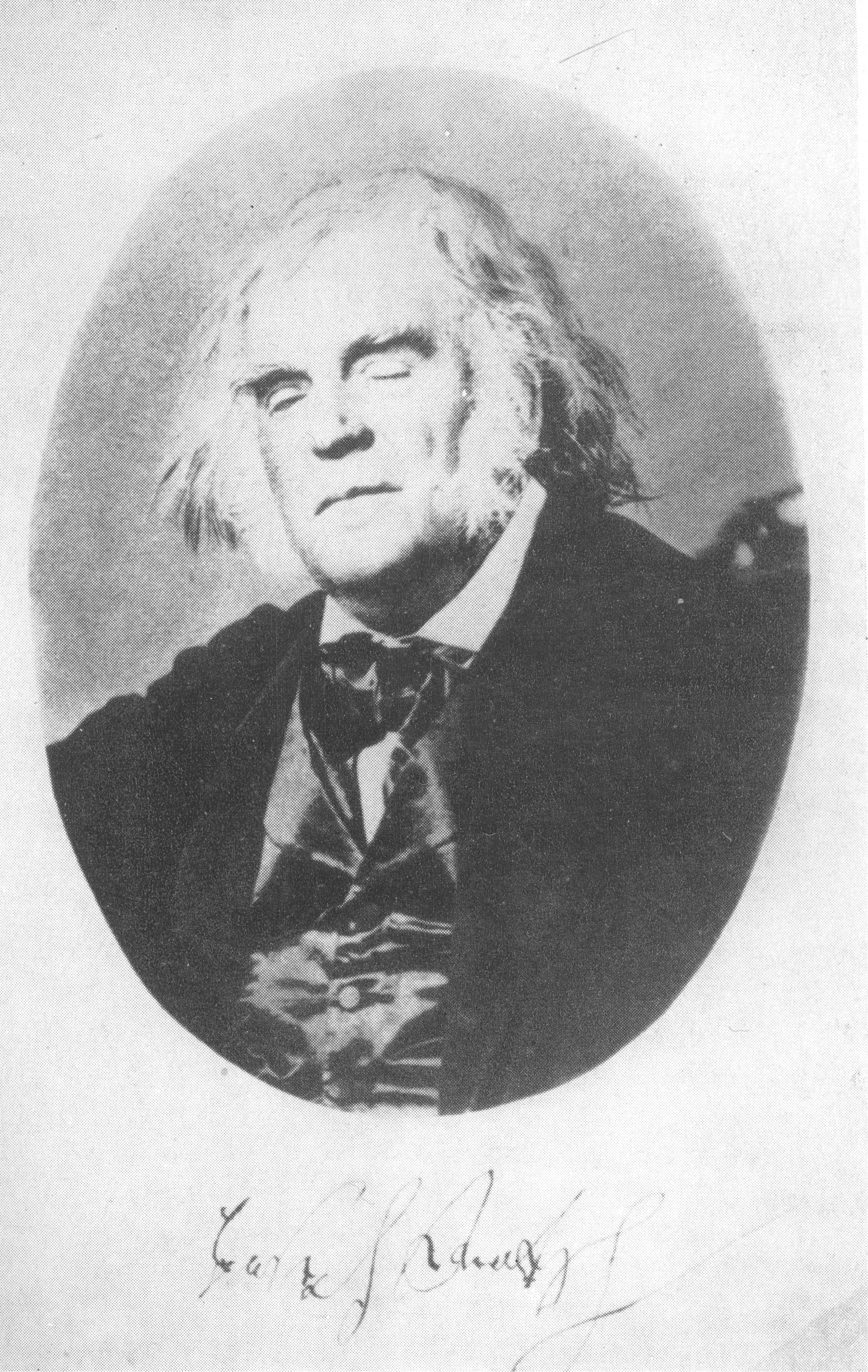
Josef Proksch

Josef Proksch or Joseph Proksch (4 August 1794, Reichenberg (now Liberec) – 20 December 1864, Prague) was a Bohemian-German pianist and composer. His daughter, Marie Proksch, was also a well-known pianist and composer.

== Biography ==
Proksch, who became blind at the age of 13, was a pupil of Jan Antonín Koželuh. In 1830, Proksch opened the Musikbildungsanstalt (Music Academy) in Prague. His teaching method of having several students play simultaneously during piano lessons was continued for over a hundred years. His most famous student was Bedřich Smetana, whom Proksch taught piano and music theory from 1843 to 1847.

== Selected works ==
Besides pedagogical works for piano, Proksch wrote a concerto for three pianos, piano sonatas, masses, and cantatas, and adapted numerous orchestral works to four to eight pianos for use in his lessons.

- Versuch einer rationellen Lehrmethode im Pianoforte-Spiel – 50 volumes, pedagogical work (1841–1864)
- Die Kunst des Ensembles im Pianoforte-Spiel – 7 volumes, pedagogical work (1859)
