= Lucona =

Cargo ship, sunk in 1977 and a political scandal in Austria

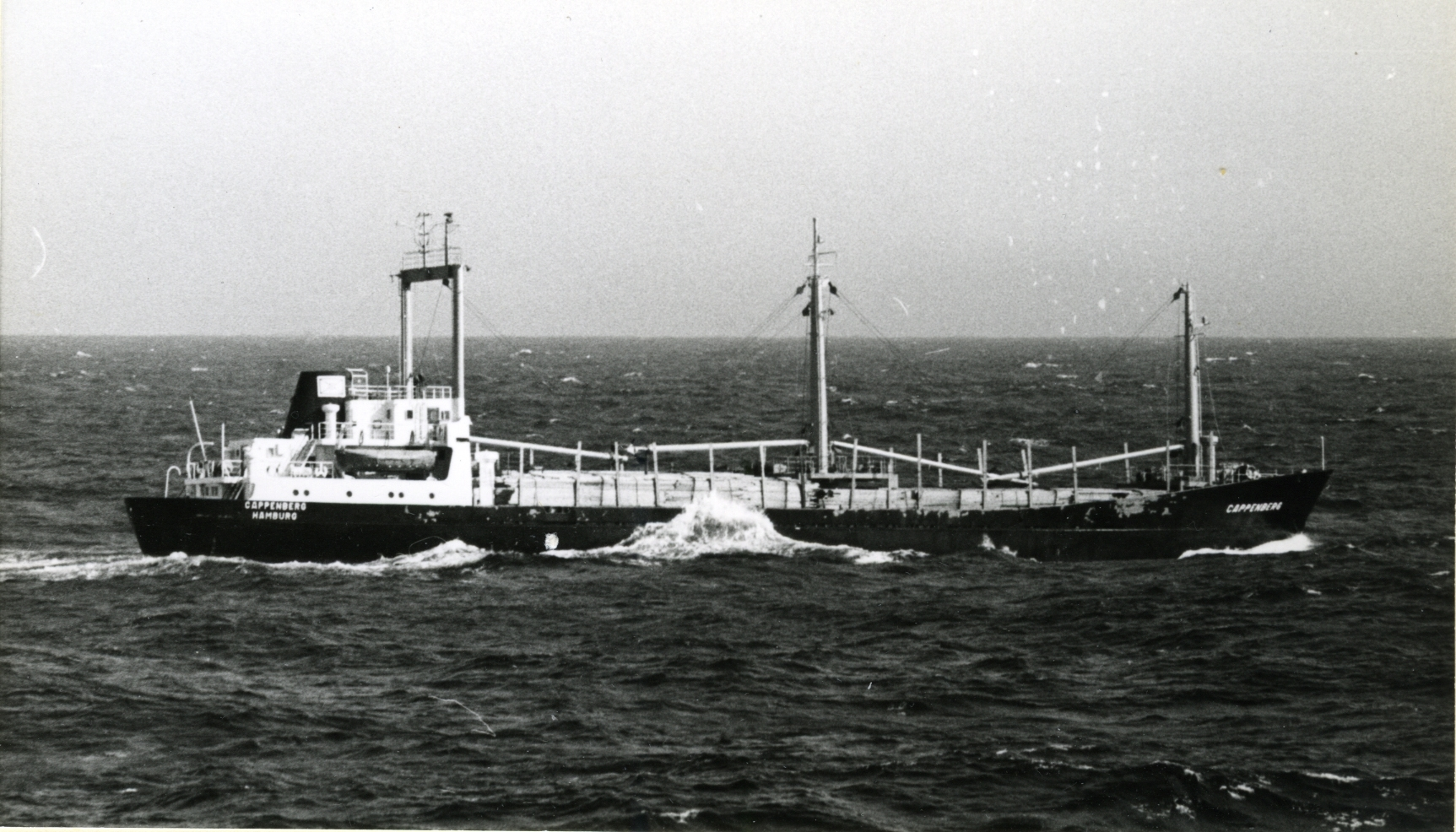
The Cappenberg, a sister ship of the Lucona

MV Lucona was a cargo ship that sank in the Indian Ocean after a powerful time bomb hidden on board exploded. The blast on 23 January 1977 resulted in the death of six people. Six others survived. The motive was insurance fraud. The subsequent investigation, political scandals, discovery of the shipwreck and murder trials were a major controversy in Austria for nearly 15 years.

== Destruction of the ship ==
The MV Lucona was a commonplace Dutch owned cargo ship leased to Zapata AG, a company owned by well-connected Austrian businessman Udo Proksch. Proksch was a well-known and eccentric high society figure and political operative in Vienna.

The ship sailed from the port of Chioggia, Italy in early January, 1977, bound for Hong Kong. The ship's manifest indicated that the cargo was expensive uranium enrichment equipment. There were 12 people on board. Ten were crew members led by the ship's master, Jacob Puister. The two passengers were Puister's wife and the chief engineer's fiancée.

On 23 January 1977, after 17 days at sea, the ship was near the Indian island Minicoy north of the Maldive Islands. The weather was good and there were no previous problems. Suddenly, a powerful explosion shook the ship, shattering the windows in the wheelhouse. Within 40 seconds, it was clear that the Lucona was sinking and Puister ordered the crew to abandon ship. Some crew members who were below deck at the time were unable to do so, and the ship sank rapidly. An inflatable life raft deployed automatically, and the six survivors were able to board it. They were rescued by a Turkish tanker ship the following day.

After the Lucona sank, Proksch, the owner of the cargo, filed an insurance claim for 212 million schilling (approx. US$20 million), certifying that the cargo was valuable uranium enrichment machinery.

== Investigation ==
Beginning later in 1977, the Austrian investigative journalist Hans Pretterebner wrote a series of magazine articles alleging corruption in the sinking of the Lucona. Credible allegations emerged that former Austrian Defense Minister Karl Lütgendorf had helped provide the explosives used to sink the ship. Lütgendorf was found shot to death in his car in 1981. His death was ruled a suicide but some observers believe that it was a murder.

In 1983, Proksch and his accomplice Hans Peter Daimler were charged with murder and fraud. The Austrian Justice Minister Harald Ofner intervened to prevent the case from proceeding, but the courts overruled that decision. In 1984, law enforcement officials searched locations associated with Proksch and Daimler, finding incriminating documents. Austrian Interior Minister Karl Blecha tried to stop the investigation but a court overruled him the following day.

In 1985, Proksch and Daimler were arrested. Austrian Foreign Minister Leopold Gratz intervened by endorsing forged documents indicating the men's innocence and the men were released.

Proksch then fled to the Philippines and Daimler fled to Germany. In the Philippines, Proksch got plastic surgery to change his appearance and obtained a forged passport and identity documents.

Pretterrebner's book Der Fall Lucona: Ost-Spionage, Korruption und Mord im Dunstkreis der Regierungsspitze : ein Sittenbild der Zweiten Republik (The Lucona Case: Eastern Espionage, Corruption and Murder in the Circle of the Government Leadership) was published in 1987. It became a best seller in Austria, drawing additional attention to the scandal.

Proksch tried to return to Vienna in October 1989 but customs officials at Heathrow Airport near London detected his real identity and he was detained when he arrived in Austria.

== Murder trials and discovery of the shipwreck ==
In his defense at trial, Proksch argued that the ship could have been sunk by a mine or a submarine. Presiding judge Hans Christian Leiningen-Westerburg authorized hiring a deep-sea shipwreck investigation company to find the wreckage of the Lucona, using a worldwide competitive bidding process that selected Eastport International, an American company operated by Craig T. Mullen. The judge participated in the exploration on the Indian Ocean.

The Lucona was located in 1991 by American shipwreck hunter David Mearns after a lengthy search. It was the first wreck that he discovered at great depth, 4,200 metres (13,799 feet). Working as a project manager for Eastport International and using Oceaneering’s unmanned mini-subs, Mearns confirmed that the ship had been sunk by a time bomb concealed within the ship, and that the cargo was actually worthless scrap metal.

After five months of planning and preparation, the Eastport International support ship MV Valiant Service sailed from Singapore on 12 January 1991. There were two devices essential to the mission. Ocean Explorer 600 was a side scan sonar device towed far behind the ship at great depths, used for surveying the ocean floor in the general area where the Lucona was believed to have sunk, to determine the location of the shipwreck. The Magellan 725 was a remotely operated underwater vehicle capable of operating at great depths and which had the capability to take photos and shoot video of the shipwreck after it had been located.

The team began their active searching on 23 January, which was 14 years to the day after the Lucona sank. On the eighth day of searching the seafloor, the operations continued after midnight, and the team located the wreckage in the early hours of 31 January 1991.

The bow was discovered first. When the stern, including the superstructure and the bridge, was found, it became clear that the forward cargo hold had been obliterated and the ship was "literally severed in half", according to Mearns. The steel hull plates in that area were "splayed outward" which proved that the source of the explosion was within the ship, in the forward cargo hold. Munitions experts estimated that 100 to 200 kilograms of explosives would have been needed. The scrap metal cargo was scattered around the wreck, including some antiquated coal mining equipment. The defense theory that a submarine or a mine had sunk the ship was refuted.

While fraud had long been suspected, investigations were obstructed for years by powerful Austrian politicians who were friends of Proksch. Eventually, several ex-ministers were convicted over their involvement in the cover-up. The ex-Minister of Foreign Affairs, Leopold Gratz, was sentenced for forging documents authenticating the cargo, and Finance Minister Hannes Androsch was dismissed for obstructing the investigations. Minister of Defense Karl Lütgendorf, a shareholder in the Proksch firm, had given permission to deliver explosives to sabotage the ship, and committed suicide when that became known.

Proksch was found guilty of murder and fraud, and sentenced to 20 years in prison on March 11, 1991. Daimler was tried and convicted in Germany and sentenced to 14 years in prison for aiding and abetting murder and other crimes. He was sentenced in absentia to life in prison in Austria.

Robert Schindler, the prosecutor, commented that convicting Proksch was a defeat for the "cynical arrogance of power" that Blecha, Gratz, Offner and other corrupt officials used to cover up the Lucona scandal for years.

Proksch died on 27 June 2001 during heart surgery in the prison hospital.

== Works about the Lucona case ==
- Pretterebner, Hans (1989). Der Fall Lucona: Ost-Spionage, Korruption und Mord im Dunstkreis der Regierungsspitze (The Lucona Case: Eastern Espionage, Corruption and Murder in the Circle of the Government Leadership) (in German). Knaur. ISBN 9783426040157.
- 1993: The Lucona Affair, a film based on Pretterrebner's book about the Lucona, starring David Suchet
- 8 April 2023: Drain the Oceans (Season 6, Episode 6), "$20 Million Time Bomb" – television documentary about the Lucona by National Geographic TV.

== See also ==
- Coffin ship (insurance)
- Gerald Freihofner
