= January 2010 in sports =

<<	January 2010					>>
Su	Mo	Tu	We	Th	Fr	Sa
					1	2
3	4	5	6	7	8	9
10	11	12	13	14	15	16
17	18	19	20	21	22	23
24	25	26	27	28	29	30
31
Sports

This list shows notable sports-related deaths, events, and notable outcomes that occurred in January 2010.

== Deaths in January ==
- 29 Tom Brookshier
- 27 Ruben Kruger
- 19 Bill McLaren
- 10 Bill Patterson

== Current sporting seasons ==
=== American football 2009 ===
- NFL
- NCAA Division I FBS

=== Auto racing 2010 ===
- GP2 Asia Series
- Rolex Sports Car Series

=== Basketball 2009 ===
- NBA
- NCAA Division I men
- NCAA Division I women
- Euroleague
- Eurocup
- EuroChallenge
- ASEAN Basketball League
- Australia
- France
- Germany
- Greece
- Iran
- Israel
- Italy
- Philippines
  - Philippine Cup
- Russia
- Spain
- Turkey

=== Cricket 2009–2010 ===
- Australia:
  - Sheffield Shield
  - Ford Ranger Cup
- Bangladesh:
  - National League
- India:
  - Ranji Trophy
- New Zealand:
  - Plunket Shield
- Pakistan:
  - Quaid-i-Azam Trophy
- South Africa:
  - SuperSport Series
- Sri Lanka:
  - Premier Trophy
- Zimbabwe:
  - Logan Cup

=== Football (soccer) 2009 ===
National teams competitions

- African Cup of Nations
- 2011 FIFA Women's World Cup qualification (UEFA)
- 2011 AFC Asian Cup qualification

International clubs competitions

- UEFA (Europe) Champions League
- Europa League
- UEFA Women's Champions League
- Copa Libertadores (South America)
- AFC (Asia) Champions League
- CONCACAF (North & Central America) Champions League
- OFC (Oceania) Champions League

Domestic (national) competitions

- Australia
- England
- France
- Germany
- Iran
- Italy
- Scotland
- Spain

=== Golf 2010 ===
- PGA Tour
- European Tour

=== Ice hockey 2009 ===
- National Hockey League

=== Rugby union 2009 ===
- Heineken Cup
- European Challenge Cup
- English Premiership
- Celtic League
- LV Cup
- Top 14

=== Winter sports ===
- Alpine Skiing World Cup
- Biathlon World Cup
- Cross-Country Skiing World Cup
- Freestyle Skiing World Cup
- Nordic Combined World Cup
- Ski Jumping World Cup
- Snowboard World Cup
- Speed Skating World Cup

== Days of the month ==
=== January 31, 2010 (Sunday) ===
==== Alpine skiing ====
- Women's World Cup in St. Moritz, Switzerland:
  - Super-G: (1) Lindsey Vonn (USA) (2) Andrea Fischbacher (AUT), Marie Marchand-Arvier (FRA)
- Men's World Cup in Kranjska Gora, Slovenia:
  - Slalom: (1) Reinfried Herbst (AUT) (2) Marcel Hirscher (AUT) (3) Julien Lizeroux (FRA)

==== American football ====
- NFL: Pro Bowl at Miami Gardens, Florida:
  - AFC All-Stars 41, NFC All-Stars 34.
    - Houston Texans quarterback Matt Schaub is the game's MVP.

==== Automobile Racing ====
- The 24 Hours of Daytona comes to a close, with Action Express Racing winning in a Porsche in the DP class and SpeedSource winning in a Mazda RX-8 in the GT class.

==== Bandy ====
- Men's World Championship in Moscow, Russia:
  - 3rd place game: (bronze) Finland 4–3 Kazakhstan
  - Final: (silver) Russia 5–6 (2OT) (gold) Sweden
    - Sweden win the title for the second straight time and tenth overall.

==== Cricket ====
- Pakistan in Australia:
  - 5th ODI in Perth:
    - Pakistan 212 (49.3 overs); Australia 213/8 (49.2 overs). **Australia win by 2 wickets, win the 5-match series 5–0**.
- Associates Twenty20 Series in Kenya:
  - Scotland 109/8 (20/20 ov); Uganda 109 (20/20 ov) in Nairobi. **Match tied (Scotland win the one-over eliminator)**.

==== Darts ====
- Players Championship Finals in Purfleet, England:
  - Final: Paul Nicholson (AUS) def. Mervyn King (ENG) 13–11

==== Football (soccer) ====
- African Cup of Nations in Angola:
  - Final: (silver) Ghana 0–1 (gold) Egypt
    - Mohamed Nagy's goal in the 85th minute gives Egypt their third successive title and seventh overall.
- AFC Champions League qualifying play-off, Semi-final Round:
  - Đà Nẵng (Vietnam) 0–3 (Thailand) Muang Thong United

==== Golf ====
- PGA Tour:
  - Farmers Insurance Open in La Jolla, California:
    - Winner: Ben Crane (USA) 275 (−13)
      - Crane wins his first PGA Tour title since 2005 and his third overall.
  - News:
    - John Daly backs away from his retirement announcement of the previous day, telling the director of the AT&T Pebble Beach National Pro-Am that he plans to play in that event in two weeks' time. (ESPN)
- European Tour:
  - The Commercialbank Qatar Masters in Qatar:
    - Winner: Robert Karlsson (SWE) 273 (−15)
      - Karlsson returns from an eye injury last season to win his 10th European Tour title.
- Champions Tour:
  - Mitsubishi Electric Championship at Hualalai in Kaʻupulehu-Kona, Hawaii
    - Winner: Tom Watson (USA) 194 (−22)
      - The limited-field opening event of the Champions Tour season sees Watson earn his 13th victory on that tour.

==== Handball ====
- European Men's Championship in Austria:
  - Bronze medal game: Poland 26–29 (bronze) Iceland
  - Final: (silver) Croatia 21–25 (gold) France
    - France win the European title for the second time and complete a treble of Olympic, World and European titles.

==== Luge ====
- World Cup in Cesana, Italy:
  - Women:

==== Nordic combined ====
- World Cup in Seefeld, Austria:
  - HS100 / 10 km:

==== Ski jumping ====
- World Cup in Oberstdorf, Germany:
  - HS 213 (Ski flying):

==== Snooker ====
- Welsh Open in Newport, Wales:
  - Final: John Higgins (SCO) (2) def. Ali Carter (ENG) (1) 9–4

==== Tennis ====
- Australian Open in Melbourne, Australia, day 14:
  - Men's singles - Final:
    - **Roger Federer** (SUI) [1] def. Andy Murray (GBR) [5] 6–3, 6–4, 7–6(11)
      - Federer wins his fourth Australian Open title and extends his record of Grand Slam titles to 16.
  - Mixed doubles - Final:
    - **Cara Black** (ZIM)/**Leander Paes** (IND) [1] def. Ekaterina Makarova (RUS)/Jaroslav Levinský (CZE) 7–5, 6–3
      - Black and Paes win their second Grand Slam title together. Paes wins his 11th Grand Slam title and gets level with fellow Indian Mahesh Bhupathi. Black wins her ninth Grand Slam title and completes a career Grand Slam in mixed doubles.

=== January 30, 2010 (Saturday) ===
==== Alpine skiing ====
- Women's World Cup in St. Moritz, Switzerland:
  - Downhill:
- Men's World Cup in Kranjska Gora, Slovenia:
  - Giant slalom:

==== Bandy ====
- Men's World Championship in Moscow, Russia:
  - Group B 4th place game: Mongolia 5–5 (1–2 pen.) Hungary
  - Group B 2nd place game: Latvia 7–4 Netherlands
  - Qualification game: United States 9–6 Canada
    - USA will remain in Group A and Canada in Group B.
  - Semifinals:
    - Sweden 9–4 Finland
    - Russia 16–3 Kazakhstan

==== Cricket ====
- U-19 World Cup Final in Lincoln, New Zealand:
  - Australia 207/9 (50 overs); Pakistan 182 (46.4 overs). **Australia win by 25 runs**.
- Associates Twenty20 Series in Kenya:
  - Uganda 123/9 (20/20 ov); Kenya 127/2 (17.2/20 ov) in Nairobi. **Kenya win by 8 wickets**.

==== Figure skating ====
- Four Continents Championships in Jeonju, South Korea:
  - Men: (gold) Adam Rippon (USA) 225.78 (silver) Tatsuki Machida (JPN) 217.48 (bronze) Kevin Reynolds (CAN) 212.99

==== Football (soccer) ====
- African Cup of Nations in Angola:
  - 3rd place: (bronze) Nigeria 1–0 Algeria
- AFC Champions League qualifying play-off, Semi-final Round:
  - Singapore Armed Forces 3–0 (Indonesia) Sriwijaya
  - Al-Karamah (Syria) 0–1 (United Arab Emirates) Al-Wahda

==== Freestyle skiing ====
- World Cup in Mont Gabriel, Canada:
  - Men's aerials:
  - Women's aerials:

==== Futsal ====
- European Championship in Hungary:
  - Third place play-off: Azerbaijan 3–5 (bronze) Czech Republic
  - Final: (silver) Portugal 2–4 (gold) Spain
    - Spain win the title for the third straight time and fifth overall.

==== Handball ====
- European Men's Championship in Austria:
  - 5th/6th place: Denmark 34–27 Spain
  - Semifinals:
    - Croatia 24–21 Poland
    - Iceland 28–36 France

==== Luge ====
- World Cup in Cesana, Italy:
  - Men:
  - Doubles:

==== Nordic combined ====
- World Cup in Seefeld, Austria:
  - HS100 / 10 km:

==== Ski jumping ====
- World Cup in Oberstdorf, Germany:
  - HS 213 Team (Ski flying):

==== Snowboarding ====
- World Cup in Calgary, Canada:
  - Men's half-pipe:
  - Women's half-pipe:
  - Men's slopestyle:
  - Women's slopestyle:

==== Tennis ====
- Australian Open in Melbourne, Australia, day 13:
  - Women's singles - Final:
    - **Serena Williams** (USA) [1] def. Justine Henin (BEL) [WC] 6–4, 3–6, 6–2
      - Williams wins her fifth Australian Open and 12th Grand Slam singles title.
  - Men's doubles - Final:
    - **Bob Bryan** (USA)/**Mike Bryan** (USA) [1] def. Daniel Nestor (CAN)/Nenad Zimonjić (SRB) [2] 6–3, 6–7(5), 6–3
      - Bob and Mike Bryan win their fourth Australian Open in five years and eighth Grand Slam men's doubles title.

=== January 29, 2010 (Friday) ===
==== Alpine skiing ====
- Women's World Cup in St. Moritz, Switzerland:
  - Super combined: (gold) Anja Pärson (SWE) 2:00.54 (silver) Michaela Kirchgasser (AUT) 2:00.97 (bronze) Lindsey Vonn (USA) 2:01.46
- Men's World Cup in Kranjska Gora, Slovenia:
  - Giant slalom: (gold) Ted Ligety (USA) 2:22.02 (silver) Marcel Hirscher (AUT) 2:22.36 (bronze) Kjetil Jansrud (NOR) 2:22.53

==== Cricket ====
- Pakistan in Australia:
  - 4th ODI in Perth:
    - Australia 277/8 (50 overs); Pakistan 142 (37.5 overs). **Australia win by 135 runs, lead the 5-match series 4–0**.

==== Figure skating ====
- Four Continents Championships in Jeonju, South Korea:
  - Ladies: (gold) Mao Asada (JPN) 183.96 (silver) Akiko Suzuki (JPN) 173.72 (bronze) Caroline Zhang (USA) 160.78
  - Ice Dance: (gold) Kaitlyn Weaver/Andrew Poje (CAN) 166.16 (silver) Allie Hann-McCurdy/Michael Coreno (CAN) 159.56 (3) Madison Hubbell/Keiffer Hubbell (USA) 154.20

==== Golf ====
- After missing the cut at the Farmers Insurance Open, two-time major winner John Daly announced his retirement.

==== Tennis ====
- Australian Open in Melbourne, Australia, day 12:
  - Men's singles – Semifinals:
    - Roger Federer (SUI) [1] def. Jo-Wilfried Tsonga (FRA) [10] 6–2, 6–3, 6–2
  - Women's doubles – Final:
    - **Serena Williams** (USA)/**Venus Williams** (USA) [2] def. Cara Black (ZIM)/Liezel Huber (USA) [1] 6–4, 6–3
      - The Williams sisters win their 4th Australian Open and 11th Grand Slam doubles title.

=== January 28, 2010 (Thursday) ===
==== Bandy ====
- Men's World Championship in Moscow, Russia: (teams in **bold** advance to the semifinals)
  - Group A:
    - United States 4–9 **Kazakhstan**
    - Norway 5–9 **Finland**
    - **Russia** 7–4 **Sweden**
      - Final standings: Russia 10 points, Sweden 8, Finland 6, Kazakhstan 4, Norway 2, USA 0.
  - Group B:
    - Netherlands 4–3 Mongolia
    - Latvia 7–6 Hungary
      - Final standings: Canada 8 points, Latvia, Netherlands 5, Mongolia, Hungary 1.
      - Canada advance to the qualification game.

==== Basketball ====
- Euroleague Top 16, matchday 1:
  - Group E: Regal FC Barcelona (Spain) 79–69 (Greece) Maroussi Athens
  - Group F: Montepaschi Siena (Italy) 76–72 (Israel) Maccabi Tel Aviv
  - Group G: Asseco Prokom Gdynia (Poland) 89–65 (Lithuania) Žalgiris Kaunas
  - Group H:
    - Khimki Moscow Region (Russia) 83–70 (Croatia) Cibona Zagreb
    - Caja Laboral Baskonia (Spain) 85–89 (Greece) Olympiacos Piraeus

==== Cricket ====
- ICC Intercontinental Cup in Nairobi:
  - Kenya 91 and 323; Scotland 306 and 110/2. **Scotland win by 8 wickets**.
    - Standings: Scotland 49 points (3 matches), Afghanistan 43 (3), Zimbabwe XI 23 (2), Kenya 23 (4), Netherlands 15 (2), Ireland 12 (3), Canada 3 (3).

==== Figure skating ====
- Four Continents Championships in Jeonju, South Korea:
  - Ice Dance – standings after Original Dance: (1) Kaitlyn Weaver/Andrew Poje (CAN) 81.09 (2) Allie Hann-McCurdy/Michael Coreno (CAN) 78.10 (3) Huang Xintong/Zheng Xun (CHN) 77.33
  - Pairs: (gold) Zhang Dan/Zhang Hao (CHN) 192.22 (silver) Keauna McLaughlin/Rockne Brubaker (USA) 170.17 (bronze) Meagan Duhamel/Craig Buntin (CAN) 158.02
  - Men – Short Program: (1) Kevin Reynolds (CAN) 81.60 (2) Song Nan (CHN) 72.95 (3) Brandon Mroz (USA) 70.88

==== Football (soccer) ====
- African Cup of Nations in Angola:
  - Semifinals:
    - Ghana 1–0 Nigeria
    - Algeria 0–4 Egypt
- Copa Libertadores First Stage, first leg:
  - Junior (Colombia) 2–2 (Uruguay) Racing

==== Futsal ====
- European Championship in Hungary:
  - Semifinals:
    - Azerbaijan 3–3 (3–5 pen.) Portugal
    - Czech Republic 1–8 Spain

==== Handball ====
- European Men's Championship in Austria: (teams in **bold** advance to the semifinals)
  - Group I in Vienna:
    - Norway 34–35 **Iceland**
    - Russia 30–31 Austria
    - **Croatia** 27–23 Denmark
      - Final standings: Croatia 9 points, Iceland 8, Denmark 6, Norway 4, Austria 3, Russia 0.
  - Group II in Innsbruck:
    - Germany 26–26 Czech Republic
    - Slovenia 32–40 Spain
    - **Poland** 24–29 **France**
      - Final standings: France 9 points, Poland, Spain 7, Czech Republic 3, Germany, Slovenia 2.

==== Tennis ====
- Australian Open in Melbourne, Australia, day 11:
  - Women's singles – Semifinals:
    - Serena Williams (USA) [1] def. Li Na (CHN) [16] 7–6(4), 7–6(1)
    - Justine Henin (BEL) def. Zheng Jie (CHN) 6–1, 6–0
  - Men's singles – Semifinals:
    - Andy Murray (GBR) [4] def. Marin Čilić (CRO) [14] 3–6, 6–4, 6–4, 6–2

=== January 27, 2010 (Wednesday) ===
==== Bandy ====
- Men's World Championship in Moscow, Russia: (teams in **bold** advance to the semifinals)
  - Group A:
    - **Sweden** 13–2 Norway
    - Finland 6–5 Kazakhstan
    - **Russia** 19–5 United States
      - Standings (after 4 games): Russia, Sweden 8 points, Finland 4, Norway, Kazakhstan 2, USA 0.
  - Group B:
    - Canada 15–1 Hungary
    - Mongolia 1–7 Latvia
      - Standings: Canada 8 points (4 games), Latvia, Netherlands 3 (3), Mongolia, Hungary 1 (3).
      - Canada advance to the qualification game.

==== Basketball ====
- Euroleague Top 16, matchday 1:
  - Group E: Panathinaikos Athens (Greece) 59–64 (Serbia) Partizan Belgrade
  - Group F: Real Madrid (Spain) 77–70 (Turkey) Efes Pilsen Istanbul
  - Group G: CSKA Moscow (Russia) 86–78 (Spain) Unicaja Málaga

==== Cricket ====
- India in Bangladesh:
  - 2nd Test in Mirpur, day 4:
    - Bangladesh 233 and 312; India 544/8d and 2/0. **India win by 10 wickets, win the 2-match series 2–0**.

==== Figure skating ====
- Four Continents Championships in Jeonju, South Korea:
  - Ice Dance – Compulsory Dance: (1) Kaitlyn Weaver/Andrew Poje (CAN) 32.67 (2) Huang Xintong/Zheng Xun (CHN) 30.12 (3) Allie Hann-McCurdy/Michael Coreno (CAN) 29.89
  - Pairs – Short Program: (1) Zhang Dan/Zhang Hao (CHN) 65.86 (2) Keauna McLaughlin/Rockne Brubaker (USA) 64.56 (3) Meagan Duhamel/Craig Buntin (CAN) 56.90
  - Ladies – Short Program: (1) Akiko Suzuki (JPN) 58.88 (2) Amanda Dobbs (USA) 57.56 (3) Mao Asada (JPN) 57.22

==== Football (soccer) ====
- Copa Libertadores First Stage, first leg:
  - Juan Aurich (Peru) 2–0 (Mexico) Estudiantes Tecos
  - Real Potosí (Bolivia) 1–1 (Brazil) Cruzeiro
  - Newell's Old Boys (Argentina) 0–0 (Ecuador) Emelec

==== Tennis ====
- Australian Open in Melbourne, Australia, day 10:
  - Men's singles – Quarterfinals:
    - Roger Federer (SUI) [1] def. Nikolay Davydenko (RUS) [6] 2–6, 6–3, 6–0, 7–5
    - Jo-Wilfried Tsonga (FRA) [10] def. Novak Djokovic (SRB) [3] 7–6(8), 6–7(5), 1–6, 6–3, 6–1
  - Women's singles – Quarterfinals:
    - Serena Williams (USA) [1] def. Victoria Azarenka (BLR) [7] 4–6, 7–6(4), 6–2
    - Li Na (CHN) [16] def. Venus Williams (USA) [6] 2–6, 7–6(4), 7–5

=== January 26, 2010 (Tuesday) ===
==== Alpine skiing ====
- Men's World Cup in Schladming, Austria:
  - Slalom: (gold) Reinfried Herbst (AUT) 1:45.91 (silver) Silvan Zurbriggen (SUI) 1:46.47 (bronze) Manfred Pranger (AUT) 1:46.73
    - Slalom standings (after 7 of 9 events): (1) Herbst 405 (2) Julien Lizeroux (FRA) 402 (3) Ivica Kostelic (CRO) 302
    - Overall standings (after 25 of 34 events): (1) Benjamin Raich (AUT) 903 (2) Carlo Janka (SUI) 829 (3) Didier Cuche (SUI) 746

==== Bandy ====
- Men's World Championship in Moscow, Russia: (teams in **bold** advance to the semifinals)
  - Group A:
    - Finland 13–2 United States
    - Kazakhstan 0–12 **Sweden**
    - **Russia** 12–2 Norway
      - Standings (after 3 games): Russia, Sweden 6 points, Finland, Norway, Kazakhstan 2, USA 0.
  - Group B:
    - Mongolia 2–18 Canada
    - Latvia 5–5 (3–2 pen.) Netherlands
      - Standings: Canada 6 points (3 games), Netherlands 3 (3), Hungary, Latvia, Mongolia 1 (2).
      - Canada advance to the qualification game.

==== Basketball ====
- ULEB Eurocup Last 16, matchday 1:
  - Group I:
    - Le Mans (France) 63–68 (Germany) ALBA Berlin
    - DKV Joventut (Spain) 74–72 (Greece) Aris BSA 2003
  - Group J:
    - Galatasaray Café Crown (Turkey) 79–85 (Russia) UNICS Kazan
    - Power Elec Valencia (Spain) 75–79 (Israel) Hapoel Jerusalem
  - Group K:
    - Panellinios BC (Greece) 70–62 (Germany) Brose Baskets
    - Benetton Basket (Italy) 69–76 (Spain) Bizkaia Bilbao Basket
  - Group L:
    - ČEZ Nymburk (Czech Republic) 60–65 (Serbia) Crvena zvezda
    - Gran Canaria 2014 (Spain) 73–65 (Turkey) Türk Telekom

==== Cricket ====
- India in Bangladesh:
  - 2nd Test in Mirpur, day 3:
    - Bangladesh 233 and 228/1 (Tamim Iqbal 151); India 544/8d. Bangladesh trail by 83 runs with 9 wickets remaining.
- Pakistan in Australia:
  - 3rd ODI in Adelaide:
    - Australia 286/6 (50 overs); Pakistan 246 (47.4 overs). **Australia win by 40 runs, lead the 5-match series 3–0**.

==== Football (soccer) ====
- Copa Libertadores First Stage, first leg:
  - Deportivo Táchira (Venezuela) 1–0 (Paraguay) Libertad
  - Colón (Argentina) 3–2 (Chile) Universidad Católica
- (Israel) Toto Cup Final in Ramat Gan:
  - Hapoel Ra'anana 0–1 **Beitar Jerusalem**

==== Futsal ====
- European Championship in Hungary:
  - Quarterfinals:
    - Russia 0–0 (6–7 pen.) Spain
    - Serbia 1–5 Portugal

==== Handball ====
- European Men's Championship in Austria: (teams in **bold** advance to the semifinals)
  - Group I in Vienna:
    - Russia 30–38 Iceland
    - Croatia 26–23 Austria
    - Norway 23–24 Denmark
      - Standings (after 4 games): Croatia 7 points, Iceland, Denmark 6, Norway 4, Austria 1, Russia 0.
  - Group II in Innsbruck:
    - Slovenia 28–37 France
    - Germany 20–25 Spain
    - **Poland** 35–34 Czech Republic
      - Standings (after 4 games): France, Poland 7 points, Spain 5, Slovenia, Czech Republic 2, Germany 1.

==== Tennis ====
- Australian Open in Melbourne, Australia, day 9:
  - Men's singles – Quarterfinals:
    - Andy Murray (GBR) [5] def. Rafael Nadal (ESP) [2] 6–3, 7–6(4), 3–0, ret.
    - Marin Čilić (CRO) [14] def. Andy Roddick (USA) [7] 7–6(4), 6–3, 3–6, 2–6, 6–3
  - Women's singles – Quarterfinals:
    - Justine Henin (BEL) def. Nadia Petrova (RUS) [19] 7–6(3), 7–5
    - Zheng Jie (CHN) def. Maria Kirilenko (RUS) 6–1, 6–3

=== January 25, 2010 (Monday) ===
==== Bandy ====
- Men's World Championship in Moscow, Russia:
  - Group A:
    - Norway 3–12 Kazakhstan
    - Sweden 14–6 United States
    - Finland 4–12 Russia
  - Group B:
    - Netherlands 1–17 Canada
    - Hungary 5–5 (2–3 pen.) Mongolia

==== Cricket ====
- India in Bangladesh:
  - 2nd Test in Mirpur, day 2:
    - Bangladesh 233; India 459/5 (Sachin Tendulkar 143, Rahul Dravid 111 retd hurt). India lead by 226 runs with 5 wickets remaining in the 1st innings.
      - Tendulkar scores his 45th Test century and Dravid his 29th, and they combine for their fourth double-century partnership.

==== Football (soccer) ====
- African Cup of Nations in Angola:
  - Quarterfinals:
    - Egypt 3–1 (ET) Cameroon
      - Ahmed Hassan scores two goals for Egypt and one own goal on his 170th cap.
    - Zambia 0–0 (4–5 pen.) Nigeria

==== Futsal ====
- European Championship in Hungary:
  - Quarterfinals:
    - Czech Republic 3–3 (3–1 pen.) Italy
    - Azerbaijan 3–3 (4–2 pen.) Ukraine

==== Golf ====
- PGA Tour:
  - Bob Hope Classic in Palm Desert, California:
    - Winner: Bill Haas (USA) 330 (−30)
      - Haas collects his first PGA Tour win in an event that his father Jay Haas won in 1988.

==== Handball ====
- European Men's Championship in Austria:
  - Group I in Vienna:
    - Croatia 26–26 Iceland
    - Norway 30–27 Austria
    - Russia 28–34 Denmark
      - Standings (after 3 games): Croatia 5 points, Iceland, Denmark, Norway 4, Austria 1, Russia 0.

==== Tennis ====
- Australian Open in Melbourne, Australia, day 8:
  - Men's singles – 4th round:
    - Roger Federer (SUI) [1] def. Lleyton Hewitt (AUS) [22] 6–2 6–3 6–4
    - Novak Djokovic (SRB) [3] def. Łukasz Kubot (POL) 6–1 6–2 7–5
    - Nikolay Davydenko (RUS) [6] def. Fernando Verdasco (ESP) [9] 6–2 7–5 4–6 6–7(5) 6–3
    - Jo-Wilfried Tsonga (FRA) [10] def. Nicolás Almagro (ESP) [26] 6–3 6–4 4–6 6–7(6) 9–7
  - Women's singles – 4th round:
    - Serena Williams (USA) [1] def. Samantha Stosur (AUS) [13] 6–4 6–2
    - Li Na (CHN) [16] def. Caroline Wozniacki (DEN) [4] 6–4 6–3
    - Venus Williams (USA) [6] def. Francesca Schiavone (ITA) [17] 3–6 6–2 6–1
    - Victoria Azarenka (BLR) [7] def. Vera Zvonareva (BLR) [9] 4–6 6–4 6–0

=== January 24, 2010 (Sunday) ===
==== Alpine skiing ====
- Men's World Cup in Kitzbühel, Austria:
  - Slalom: (gold) Felix Neureuther (GER) 1:37.35 (silver) Julien Lizeroux (FRA) 1:37.74 (bronze) Giuliano Razzoli (ITA) 1:38.34
  - Combined: (gold) Ivica Kostelić (CRO) 3:33.64 (silver) Silvan Zurbriggen (SUI) 3:35.86 (bronze) Benjamin Raich (AUT) 3:36.05
- Women's World Cup in Cortina, Italy:
  - Giant slalom: (gold) Tanja Poutiainen (FIN) 2:26.51 (silver) Viktoria Rebensburg (GER) 2:27.56 (bronze) Kathrin Hölzl (GER) 2:27.96

==== American football ====
- NFL Conference Championships:
  - AFC Championship Game: (1) Indianapolis Colts 30, (5) New York Jets 17
    - The Jets take a 17–6 lead in the second quarter before Peyton Manning throws three touchdown passes against the league's number one defense. This will be the Colts' fourth trip to the Super Bowl, all in Miami.
  - NFC Championship Game: (1) New Orleans Saints 31, (2) Minnesota Vikings 28 (OT)
    - In the first NFC Championship game ever played at the Superdome, Garrett Hartley's 40-yard field goal in overtime sends the Saints to their first ever Super Bowl. The Vikings commit five turnovers.

==== Badminton ====
- BWF Super Series:
  - Malaysia Super Series:

==== Bandy ====
- Men's World Championship in Moscow, Russia:
  - Group A:
    - Russia 14–2 Kazakhstan
    - Sweden 8–1 Finland
    - United States 5–10 Norway
  - Group B:
    - Netherlands 5–4 Hungary
    - Canada 15–2 Latvia

==== Biathlon ====
- World Cup 6 in Antholz-Anterselva, Italy:
  - 10 km Pursuit Women: (gold) Andrea Henkel (GER) 30:59.8 (1 penalty loop) (silver) Magdalena Neuner (GER) 31:23.1 (4) (bronze) Ann Kristin Flatland (NOR) 31:44.7 (1)
    - Overall standings (14 of 25 events): (1) Helena Jonsson (SWE) 536 points (2) Henkel 465 (3) Simone Hauswald (GER) 452
    - Pursuit standings (3 of 6 events): (1) Henkel 129 points (2) Svetlana Sleptsova (RUS) 126 (3) Neuner 121
  - 12.5 km Pursuit Men: (gold) Daniel Mesotitsch (AUT) 31:50.4 (1 penalty loop) (silver) Arnd Peiffer (GER) 31:52.1 (1) (bronze) Dominik Landertinger (AUT) 32:10.1 (3)
    - Overall standings (14 of 25 events): (1) Simon Fourcade (FRA) 429 points (2) Evgeny Ustyugov (RUS) 414 (3) Christoph Sumann (AUT) 404
    - Pursuit standings (3 of 6 events): (1) Simon Eder (AUT) 125 points (2) Landertinger 112 (3) Peiffer 108

==== Cricket ====
- India in Bangladesh:
  - 2nd Test in Mirpur, day 1:
    - Bangladesh 233; India 69/0. India trail by 164 runs with 10 wickets remaining in the 1st innings.
- Pakistan in Australia:
  - 2nd ODI in Sydney:
    - Australia 267/6 (50 overs); Pakistan 127 (37.3 overs). **Australia win by 140 runs, lead the 5-match series 2–0**.
- ICC Intercontinental Cup in Dambulla, Sri Lanka:
  - Ireland 405 and 202; Afghanistan 474 and 137/3. **Afghanistan win by 7 wickets**.
    - Standings: Afghanistan 43 points (3 matches), Scotland 29 (2), Zimbabwe XI 23 (2), Kenya 23 (3), Netherlands 15 (2), Ireland 12 (3), Canada 3 (3).

==== Cross-country skiing ====
- World Cup in Rybinsk, Russia:
  - Women's Team Sprint Freestyle: (gold) Germany (Stefanie Böhler, Evi Sachenbacher-Stehle) (silver) Slovenia (Katja Visnar, Vesna Fabjan) (bronze) Russia (Irina Khazova, Olga Rocheva)
  - Men's Team Sprint Freestyle: (gold) Russia (Nikolay Morilov, Alexey Petukhov) (silver) Italy (Fabio Pasini, Loris Frasnelli) (bronze) Germany (Tim Tscharnke, Josef Wenzl)

==== Cycling ====
- UCI ProTour:
  - Tour Down Under in Australia:
    - Stage 6 – Adelaide, 90 km (56 mi):
      - General classification:

==== Football (soccer) ====
- African Cup of Nations in Angola:
  - Quarterfinals:
    - Angola 0–1 Ghana
    - Ivory Coast 2–3 (ET) Algeria
      - Madjid Bougherra scores in injury time to level the score at 2–2, and Hamer Bouazza's goal 2 minutes into extra time puts Algeria in the semifinals for the first time in 20 years.

==== Freestyle skiing ====
- World Cup in Lake Placid, United States:
  - Men's skicross: (gold) Christopher Del Bosco (CAN) (silver) Andreas Matt (AUT) (bronze) David Duncan (CAN)
    - Skicross standings (after 7 of 12 events): (1) Michael Schmid (SUI) 435 (2) Matt 306 (3) Del Bosco 297
  - Women's skicross: (gold) Kelsey Serwa (CAN) (silver) Fanny Smith (SUI) (bronze) Ophélie David (FRA)
    - Skicross standings (after 7 of 12 events): (1) David 475 (2) Ashleigh McIvor (CAN) 437 (3) Serwa 292

==== Futsal ====
- European Championship in Hungary: (teams in **bold** advance to the quarterfinals)
  - Group C: **Serbia** 4–3 **Russia**
    - Final standings: Serbia 6 points, Russia 3, Slovenia 0.
  - Group D: **Portugal** 1–6 **Spain**
    - Final standings: Spain 6 points, Portugal, Belarus 1.

==== Golf ====
- PGA Tour:
  - Bob Hope Classic in Palm Desert, California:
    - Heavy rain on Thursday washed out that day's play. The last of five scheduled rounds will be played on Monday.
- European Tour:
  - Abu Dhabi Golf Championship in United Arab Emirates:
    - Winner: Martin Kaymer (DEU) 267 (−21)
      - Kaymer returns to the site of his first European Tour win, in this event in 2008, and wins his fifth career title.

==== Handball ====
- European Men's Championship in Austria:
  - Group II in Innsbruck:
    - Germany 22–24 France
    - Poland 32–26 Spain
    - Slovenia 35–37 Czech Republic
      - Standings (after 3 games): Poland, France 5 points, Spain 3, Czech Republic, Slovenia 2, Germany 1.

==== Luge ====
- European Championships in Sigulda, Latvia:
  - Men: (gold) Albert Demtschenko (RUS) 1:36.748 (silver) Wolfgang Kindl (AUT) 1:36.974 (bronze) Daniel Pfister (AUT) 1:37.062
  - Teams: (gold) Latvia (Anna Orlova, Martins Rubenis, Andris Sics/Juris Sics) 2:16.992 (silver) Austria (Veronika Halder, Wolfgang Kindl, Andreas Linger/Wolfgang Linger) 2:17.022 (bronze) Germany (Corinna Martini, Johannes Ludwig, Tobias Wendl/Tobias Arlt) 2:17.076

==== Nordic combined ====
- World Cup in Schonach, Germany:
  - HS96 / 4 x 5 km team: (gold) Germany (Georg Hettich, Eric Frenzel, Björn Kircheisen, Tino Edelmann) 42:49.4 (silver) France (Sébastien Lacroix, Maxime Laheurte, Jonathan Felisaz, Jason Lamy-Chappuis) 43:37.7 (bronze) Austria (Lukas Klapfer, Wilhelm Denifl, Marco Pichlmayer, Tobias Kammerlander) 43:50.5

==== Rugby union ====
- Heineken Cup pool stage, matchday 6: (teams in **bold** advance to the quarterfinals; teams in italics parachute into the Amlin Challenge Cup)
  - Pool 2:
    - **Biarritz** (France) 41–20 (Scotland) Glasgow Warriors
    - Newport Gwent Dragons (Wales) 23–32 (England) Gloucester
    - Final standings: Biarritz 23 points, Gloucester 17, Glasgow Warriors 9, Dragons 6.
  - Pool 5:
    - Harlequins (England) 20–45 (Wales) Cardiff Blues
    - Sale Sharks (England) 13–19 (France) **Toulouse**
    - Final standings: Toulouse 23 points, Cardiff Blues 18, Sale Sharks 14, Harlequins 2.
  - Quarterfinal matchups:
    - Munster (Ireland) – (England) Northampton Saints
    - Biarritz (France) – (Wales) Ospreys
    - Toulouse (France) – (France) Stade Français
    - Leinster (Ireland) – (France) Clermont
- Amlin Challenge Cup pool stage, matchday 6: (teams in **bold** advance to the quarterfinals)
  - Pool 1: Leeds Carnegie (England) 9–18 (France) **Bourgoin**
    - Final standings: Bourgoin 23 points, Leeds 19, Overmach Parma 8, București Oaks 7.
  - Quarterfinal matchups:
    - Connacht (Ireland) – (France) Bourgoin
    - Toulon (France) – (Wales) Scarlets
    - London Wasps (England) – (England) Gloucester
    - Newcastle Falcons (England) – (Wales) Cardiff Blues

==== Short track speed skating ====
- European Championships in Dresden, Germany:

==== Snowboarding ====
- World Cup in Stoneham, Canada:
  - Men's parallel giant slalom: (gold) Benjamin Karl (AUT) (silver) Andreas Prommegger (AUT) (bronze) Jasey-Jay Anderson (CAN)
    - Standings (after 6 of 9 events): (1) Karl 4260 points (2) Anderson 3800 (3) Prommegger 3280
  - Women's parallel giant slalom: (gold) Svetlana Boldykova (RUS) (silver) Alena Zavarzina (RUS) (bronze) Nathalie Desmares (FRA)
    - Standings (after 6 of 9 events): (1) Fraenzi Maegert-Kohli (SUI) 3020 (2) Nicolien Sauerbreij (NED) 2980 (3) Zavarzina 2666

==== Ten-pin bowling ====
- Kelly Kulick becomes the first woman to win an event against men on the PBA Tour, defeating Chris Barnes 265–195 to win the Tournament of Champions.

==== Tennis ====
- Australian Open in Melbourne, Australia, day 7:
  - Men's singles – 4th round:
    - Rafael Nadal (ESP) [2] def. Ivo Karlović (CRO) 6–4 4–6 6–4 6–4
    - Marin Čilić (CRO) [14] def. Juan Martín del Potro (ARG) [4] 5–7 6–4 7–5 5–7 6–3
    - Andy Murray (GBR) [5] def. John Isner (USA) [33] 7–6(4) 6–3 6–2
    - Andy Roddick (USA) [7] def. Fernando González (CHI) [11] 6–3 3–6 4–6 7–5 6–2
  - Women's singles – 4th round:
    - Maria Kirilenko (RUS) def. Dinara Safina (RUS) [2] 5–4 Ret.
    - Nadia Petrova (RUS) [19] def. Svetlana Kuznetsova (RUS) [3] 6–3 3–6 6–1
    - Zheng Jie (CHN) def. Alona Bondarenko (UKR) [31] 7–6(5) 6–4
    - Justine Henin (BEL) def. Yanina Wickmayer (BEL) 7–6(3) 1–6 6–3

=== January 23, 2010 (Saturday) ===
==== Alpine skiing ====
- Men's World Cup in Kitzbühel, Austria:
  - Downhill: (gold) Didier Cuche (SUI) 1:53.74 (silver) Andrej Šporn (SLO) 1:54.02 (bronze) Werner Heel (ITA) 1:54.13
    - Downhill standings (after 6 of 8 races): (1) Cuche 396 (2) Carlo Janka (SUI) 308 (3) Manuel Osborne-Paradis (CAN) 235
    - Overall standings (after 22 of 34 races): (1) Janka 793 (2) Benjamin Raich (AUT) 743 (3) Cuche 726
- Women's World Cup in Cortina, Italy:
  - Downhill: (gold) Lindsey Vonn (USA) 1:37.70 (silver) Maria Riesch (GER) 1:38.12 (bronze) Anja Paerson (SWE) & Nadja Kamer (SUI) 1:38.56
    - Downhill standings (after 5 of 8 races): (1) Vonn 500 (2) Riesch 316 (3) Paerson 275
    - Overall standings (after 22 of 33 races): (1) Vonn 1094 (2) Riesch 1018 (3) Kathrin Zettel (AUT) 829

==== Biathlon ====
- World Cup 6 in Antholz-Anterselva, Italy:
  - 10 km Sprint Men: (gold) Arnd Peiffer (GER) 24:27.4 (0 penalties) (silver) Dominik Landertinger (AUT) 24:33.4 (1) (bronze) Christoph Stephan (GER) 24:42.5 (0)
    - Overall standings (after 13 of 25 races): (1) Evgeny Ustyugov (RUS) 412 points (2) Simon Fourcade (FRA) 395 (3) Tim Burke (USA) 393
    - Sprint standings (after 6 of 10 races): (1) Ole Einar Bjørndalen (NOR) 201 points (2) Landertinger 192 (3) Michael Greis (GER) 191

==== Bobsleigh ====
- World Cup and European championships in Igls, Austria:
  - Two-man: (gold) Beat Hefti/Thomas Lamparter (SUI) 1:44.01 (silver) André Lange/Kevin Kuske (GER) 1:44.12 (bronze) Daniel Schmid/Juerg Egger (SUI) 1:44.37
    - Final standings: (1) Ivo Rüegg (SUI) 1514 (2) Thomas Florschütz (GER) 1475 (3) Karl Angerer (GER) 1474

==== Cricket ====
- ICC Intercontinental Shield in Dubai:
  - United Arab Emirates 361 and 282/9d; Uganda 373 and 79/6. **Match drawn**.
    - Standings: Uganda 29 points (2 matches), United Arab Emirates 17 (2), Namibia 6 (1), Bermuda 0 (1).

==== Cross-country skiing ====
- World Cup in Rybinsk, Russia:
  - Women's Sprint Freestyle: (gold) Vesna Fabjan (SLO) (silver) Magda Genuin (ITA) (bronze) Justyna Kowalczyk (POL)
    - Overall standings: (1) Kowalczyk 1285 points (2) Petra Majdič (SLO) 1147 (3) Aino-Kaisa Saarinen (FIN) 909
  - Men's Sprint Freestyle: (gold) Nikolay Morilov (RUS) (silver) Alexey Petukhov (RUS) (bronze) Nikita Kriukov (RUS)
    - Overall standings: (1) Petter Northug (NOR) 1060 points (2) Lukáš Bauer (CZE) 763 (3) Marcus Hellner (SWE) 627

==== Cycling ====
- UCI ProTour:
  - Tour Down Under in Australia:
    - Stage 5 – Snapper Point to Willunga, 148 km (92 mi):
      - General classification:

==== Figure skating ====
- European Championships in Tallinn, Estonia:
  - Ladies: (gold) Carolina Kostner (ITA) 173.46 (silver) Laura Lepistö (FIN) 166.37 (bronze) Elene Gedevanishvili (GEO) 164.54
    - Kostner wins the title for the third time in four years. Gedevanishvili wins the first ever medal for Georgia in figure skating championships.
- U.S. Championships in Spokane, Washington:
  - Senior Ice Dancing: (gold) Meryl Davis/Charlie White 222.29 (silver) Tanith Belbin/Benjamin Agosto 218.51 (bronze) Emily Samuelson/Evan Bates 190.69
    - Davis and White win their second consecutive title.
  - Senior Ladies: (gold) Rachael Flatt 200.11 (silver) Mirai Nagasu 188.78 (bronze) Ashley Wagner 184.70.
    - Flatt wins her first national title. Olympic silver medallist Sasha Cohen finishes fourth and fails to qualify for the 2010 Olympics.

==== Futsal ====
- European Championship in Hungary: (teams in **bold** advance to the quarterfinals)
  - Group A: **Czech Republic** 6–5 Hungary
    - Final standings: **Azerbaijan** 6 points, Czesh Republic 3, Hungary 0.
  - Group B: **Ukraine** 2–4 **Italy**
    - Final standings: Italy 6 points, Ukraine 3, Belgium 0.

==== Handball ====
- European Men's Championship in Austria: (teams in **bold** advance to the Main Round)
  - Group A in Graz:
    - **Croatia** 30–28 **Russia**
    - **Norway** 31–29 Ukraine
      - Final standings: Croatia 6 points, Norway 4, Russia 2, Ukraine 2.
  - Group B in Linz:
    - **Denmark** 22–27 **Iceland**
    - **Austria** 37–31 Serbia
      - Final standings: Iceland, Denmark 4 points, Austria 3, Serbia 1.

==== Luge ====
- European Championships in Sigulda, Latvia:
  - Women: (gold) Tatiana Ivanova (RUS) 1:25.517 (silver) Corinna Martini (GER) 1:25.842 (bronze) Nina Reithmayer (AUT) 1:26.007
  - Doubles: (gold) Andreas Linger/Wolfgang Linger (AUT) 1:24.415 (silver) Tobias Wendl/Tobias Arlt (GER) 1:24.977 (bronze) Tobias Schiegl/Markus Schiegl (AUT) 1:25.023

==== Nordic combined ====
- World Cup in Schonach, Germany:
  - HS96 / 10 km: (gold) Jason Lamy-Chappuis (FRA) 21:34.5 (silver) Pavel Churavý (CZE) 21:36.6 (bronze) Alessandro Pittin (ITA) 21:38.9
    - Standings (after 14 of 19 events): (1) Lamy-Chappuis 969 points (2) Felix Gottwald (AUT) 589 (3) Magnus Moan (NOR) 542

==== Rugby union ====
- Heineken Cup pool stage, matchday 6: (teams in **bold** advance to the quarterfinals; teams in italics parachute into the Amlin Challenge Cup)
  - Pool 3:
    - Viadana (Italy) 20–59 (France) **Clermont Auvergne**
    - **Ospreys** (Wales) 17–12 (England) Leicester Tigers
      - Final standings: Clermont 21 points, Ospreys 20, Leicester 18, Viadana 0.
  - Pool 4:
    - Bath (England) 10–28 (Ireland) Ulster
    - Edinburgh (Scotland) 9–7 (France) **Stade Français**
      - Final standings: Stade Français 18 points, Ulster 17, Edinburgh 13, Bath 7.
  - Pool 6:
    - Brive (France) 17–20 (Wales) Scarlets
    - London Irish (England) 11–11 (Ireland) **Leinster**
      - Leinster secure a home quarterfinal. This result also secures a Heineken Cup quarterfinal berth for **Northampton Saints** as one of the top two runners-up.
      - Final standings: Leinster 22 points, Scarlets 17 (8–1 on head-to-head competition points), London Irish 17, Brive 1.
- Amlin Challenge Cup pool stage, matchday 6: (teams in **bold** advance to the quarterfinals)
  - Pool 1: Overmach Parma (Italy) 16–9 (Romania) București Oaks
    - Standings: Leeds Carnegie, Bourgoin 19 points (5 matches); Overmach Parma 8 (6); București Oaks 7 (6).
  - Pool 2: Olympus Madrid (Spain) 0–66 (Ireland) **Connacht**
    - Connacht secure the top seed for the quarterfinals, meaning that they avoid a quarterfinal against a Heineken Cup team.
    - Final standings: Connacht 26 points, Montpellier 19, Worcester Warriors 13, Olympus Madrid 0.
  - Pool 3:
    - Rovigo (Italy) 8–56 (England) Saracens
    - **Toulon** (France) 42–10 (France) Castres
      - Final standings: Toulon 23 points, Saracens 22, Castres 11, Rovigo 0
  - Pool 4: Rugby Roma Olimpic (Italy) 6–55 (France) Bayonne
    - Final standings: **London Wasps** 22 points, Bayonne 19, Racing Métro 16, Roma 0.

==== Skeleton ====
- World Cup and European championships in Igls, Austria:
  - Men: (gold) Martins Dukurs (LAT) 1:46.14 (silver) Frank Rommel (GER) 1:46.39 (bronze) Aleksandr Tretyakov (RUS) 1:46.49
    - Final standings: (1) Dukurs 1694 points (2) Rommel 1466 (3) Sandro Stielicke (GER) 1438

==== Ski jumping ====
- World Cup in Zakopane, Poland:
  - HS 134: (gold) Gregor Schlierenzauer (AUT) 295.6 points (silver) Simon Ammann (SUI) 288.1 (bronze) Thomas Morgenstern (AUT) 276.2
    - Individual standings (after 16 of 23 events): (1) Ammann 1099 (2) Schlierenzauer 996 (3) Morgenstern 699

==== Snowboarding ====
- World Cup in Quebec City, Canada:
  - Men's big air: (gold) Janne Korpi (FIN) (silver) Stefan Falkeis (AUT) (bronze) Jaakko Ruha (FIN)
    - Final standings: (1) Stefan Gimpl (AUT) 4300 points (2) Gian-Luca Cavigelli (SUI) 3320 (3) Matevz Pristavec (SLO) 1620

==== Tennis ====
- Australian Open in Melbourne, Australia, day 6:
  - Men's singles – 3rd round:
    - Roger Federer (SUI) [1] def. Albert Montañés (ESP) [31] 6–3 6–4 6–4
    - Novak Djokovic (SRB) [3] def. Denis Istomin (UZB) 6–1 6–1 6–2
    - Nikolay Davydenko (RUS) [6] def. Juan Mónaco (ARG) [30] 6–0 6–3 6–4
    - Fernando Verdasco (ESP) [9] def. Stefan Koubek (AUT) 6–1 ret.
    - Jo-Wilfried Tsonga (FRA) [10] def. Tommy Haas (GER) [18] 6–4 3–6 6–1 7–5
  - Women's singles – 3rd round:
    - Serena Williams (USA) [1] def. Carla Suárez Navarro (ESP) [32] 6–0 6–3
    - Caroline Wozniacki (DEN) [4] def. Shahar Pe'er (ISR) [29] 6–4 6–0
    - Venus Williams (USA) [6] def. Casey Dellacqua (AUS) 6–1 7–6(4)
    - Victoria Azarenka (BLR) [7] def. Tathiana Garbin (ITA) 6–0 6–2
    - Vera Zvonareva (BLR) [9] def. Gisela Dulko (ARG) 6–1 7–5
    - Francesca Schiavone (ITA) [17] def. Agnieszka Radwańska (POL) [10] 6–2 6–2

=== January 22, 2010 (Friday) ===
==== Alpine skiing ====
- Men's World Cup in Kitzbühel, Austria:
  - Super-G: (gold) Didier Cuche (SUI) 1:17.94 (silver) Michael Walchhofer (AUT) 1:18.22 (bronze) Georg Streitberger (AUT) 1:18.23
    - Super-G standings (after 4 of 6 races): (1) Walchhofer 260 (2) Aksel Lund Svindal (NOR) 194 (3) benjamin Raich (AUT) 158
    - Overall standings (after 21 of 34 races): (1) Carlo Janka (SUI) 769 (2) Benjamin Raich (AUT) 743 (3) Cuche 626
- Women's World Cup in Cortina, Italy:
  - Super-G: (gold) Lindsey Vonn (USA) 1:21.74 (silver) Fabienne Suter (SUI) 1:22.41 (bronze) Anja Paerson (SWE) 1::22.48
    - Super-G standings (after 4 of 6 races): (1) Vonn 340 (2) Suter 170 (3) Elisabeth Görgl (AUT) 162
    - Overall standings (after 21 of 33 races): (1) Vonn 994 (2) Maria Riesch (GER) 938 (3) Kathrin Zettel (AUT) 829

==== Biathlon ====
- World Cup 6 in Antholz-Anterselva, Italy:
  - 7.5 km Sprint Women: (gold) Magdalena Neuner (GER) 20:19.7 (1 penalty lap) (silver) Andrea Henkel (GER) 20:32.9 (0) (bronze) Sandrine Bailly (FRA) 20:48.3 (0)
    - Sprint standings (after 6 of 10 races): (1) Kati Wilhelm (GER) 208 (2) Anna Carin Olofsson-Zidek (SWE) 207 (3) Helena Jonsson (SWE) 206
    - Overall standings (after 13 of 25 races): (1) Helena Jonsson (SWE) 536 (2) Anna Carin Olofsson-Zidek (SWE) 435 (3) Kati Wilhelm (GER) 427

==== Bobsleigh ====
- World Cup in Igls, Austria:
  - Two-woman: (gold) Shauna Rohbock/Michelle Rzepka (USA) 1:47.13 (silver) Cathleen Martini/Romy Logsch (GER) 1:47.44 (bronze) Kaillie Humphries/Heather Moyse (CAN) 1:47.46
    - Final standings: (1) Sandra Kiriasis (GER) 1608 (2) Humphries 1563 (3) Martini 1545
- European championships in Igls, Austria:
  - Two-woman: (gold) Cathleen Martini/Romy Logsch (GER) 1:47.44 (silver) Sabina Rafner/Hanne Schenk (SUI) 1:47.61 (bronze) Sandra Kiriasis/Christin Senkel (GER) 1:47.82

==== Cricket ====
- Pakistan in Australia:
  - 1st ODI in Brisbane:
    - Pakistan 274 (49.4 overs); Australia 275/5 (48.3 overs, Cameron White 105). **Australia win by 5 wickets, lead the 5-match series 1–0**.

==== Cross-country skiing ====
- World Cup in Rybinsk, Russia:
  - Women's Sprint Freestyle: (gold) Vesna Fabjan (SLO) (silver) Magda Genuin (ITA) (bronze) Justyna Kowalczyk (POL)
    - Sprint standings (after 8 of 12 events): (1) Petra Majdic (SLO) 422 (2) Kowalczyk 339 (3) Aino-Kaisa Saarinen (FIN) 295
    - Overall standings (after 20 of 31 events): (1) Kowalczyk 1285 (2) Petra Majdic (SLO) 1147 (3) Aino-Kaisa Saarinen (FIN) 909
  - Men's Sprint Freestyle: (gold) Nikolay Morilov (RUS) (silver) Alexey Petukhov (RUS) (bronze) Nikita Kriukov (RUS)
    - Sprint standings (after 8 of 12 events): (1) Ola Vigen Hattestad (NOR) 250 (2) Kriukov 248 (3) Petukhov 241
    - Overall standings (after 20 of 31 events): (1) Petter Northug (NOR) 1060 (2) Lukáš Bauer (CZE) 763 (3) Marcus Hellner (SWE) 627

==== Cycling ====
- UCI ProTour:
  - Tour Down Under in Australia:
    - Stage 4 – Norwood to Goolwa, 149.5 km (92.9 mi):
      - General classification:

==== Figure skating ====
- European Championships in Tallinn, Estonia:
  - Ladies – Short Program: (1) Carolina Kostner (ITA) 65.80 (2) Kiira Korpi (FIN) 64.26 (3) Laura Lepistö (FIN) 62.96
  - Ice Dancing: (gold) Oksana Domnina/Maxim Shabalin (RUS) 199.25 (silver) Federica Faiella/Massimo Scali (ITA) 195.86 (bronze) Jana Khokhlova/Sergei Novitski 189.67
    - Domnina and Shabalin win their second title in three years.
- U.S. Championships in Spokane, Washington:
  - Senior Ice Dancing – standings after Original Dance: (1) Meryl Davis/Charlie White 113.53 (2) Tanith Belbin/Benjamin Agosto 111.91 (3) Emily Samuelson/Evan Bates 96.96

==== Freestyle skiing ====
- World Cup in Lake Placid, United States:
  - Men's aerials: (gold) Anton Kushnir (BLR) 253.10 (silver) Warren Shouldice (CAN) 251.55 (bronze) Ryan Blais (CAN) 250.80
    - Aerials standings (after 5 of 6 events): (1) Kushnir 440 (2) Zongyang Jia (CHN) 236 (3) Guangpu Qi (CHN) 185
  - Women's aerials: (gold) Lydia Lassila (AUS) 203.38 (silver) Nina Li (CHN) 197.56 (bronze) Zhang Xin (CHN) 181.72
    - Aerials standings (after 5 of 6 events): (1) Li 336 (2) Xinxin Guo 306 (3) Mengtao Xu 278

==== Futsal ====
- European Championship in Hungary: (teams in **bold** advance to the quarterfinals)
  - Group C: Slovenia 0–2 **Serbia**
    - Standings: **Russia**, Serbia 3 points (1 match), Slovenia 0 (2).
  - Group D: Belarus 5–5 Portugal
    - Standings: **Spain** 3 points (1 match), Portugal 1 (1), Belarus 1 (2).

==== Handball ====
- European Men's Championship in Austria: (teams in **bold** advance to the Main Round)
  - Group C in Innsbruck:
    - **Germany** 30–29 Sweden
    - **Poland** 30–30 **Slovenia**
      - Final standings: Poland 5 points, Slovenia 4, Germany 3, Sweden 0.
  - Group D in Wiener Neustadt:
    - **France** 24–24 **Spain**
    - Hungary 26–33 **Czech Republic**
      - Final standings: Spain 5 points, France 4, Czech Republic 2, Hungary 1.

==== Rugby union ====
- Heineken Cup pool stage, matchday 6: (teams in **bold** advance to the quarterfinals; teams in italics assured of at least a berth in the Amlin Challenge Cup quarterfinals)
  - Pool 1:
    - **Munster** (Ireland) 12–9 (England) Northampton Saints
      - Munster also assure themselves a home quarterfinal. This result also secures a spot in the Heineken Cup quarterfinals for their Irish rivals **Leinster**.
    - Perpignan (France) 34–6 (Italy) Benetton Treviso
      - Final standings: Munster 24 points, Northampton Saints 19, Perpignan 11, Benetton Treviso 5.
- Amlin Challenge Cup pool stage, matchday 6: (teams in **bold** advance to the quarterfinals)
  - Pool 2: Montpellier (France) 8–3 (England) Worcester Warriors
    - Standings: **Connacht** 21 points (5 matches), Montpellier 19 (6), Worcester Warriors 13 (6), Olympus Madrid 0 (5).
  - Pool 5:
    - **Newcastle Falcons** (England) 20–3 (Italy) Petrarca Padova
    - Montauban (France) 27–20 (France) Albi
      - Final standings: Newcastle Falcons 23 points, Montauban 21, Albi 12, Petrarca Padova 1.

==== Skeleton ====
- World Cup in Igls, Austria:
  - Women: (gold) Anja Huber (GER) 1:49.57 (silver) Kerstin Szymkowiak (GER) 1:49.93 (bronze) Mellisa Hollingsworth (CAN) 1:49.96
    - Final standings: (1) Hollingsworth 1646 points (2) Shelley Rudman (GBR) 1604 (3) Szymkowiak 1574
- European championships in Igls, Austria:
  - Women: (gold) Anja Huber (GER) 1:49.57 (silver) Kerstin Szymkowiak (GER) 1:49.93 (bronze) Shelley Rudman (GBR) 1:50.25

==== Ski jumping ====
- World Cup in Zakopane, Poland:
  - HS 134: (gold) Gregor Schlierenzauer (AUT) 289.8 (silver) Simon Ammann (SUI) 278.1 (bronze) Thomas Morgenstern (AUT) 266.2
    - Individual standings (after 16 of 24 events): (1) Ammann 1019 (2) Schlierenzauer 896 (3) Morgenstern 639

==== Snowboarding ====
- World Cup in Stoneham, Canada:
  - Men's half-pipe: (gold) Janne Korpi (FIN) 45.7 (silver) Jeff Batchelor (CAN) 44.3 (bronze) Antti Autti (FIN) 41.8
    - Halfpipe standings (after 4 of 12 events): (1) Korpi 1730 (2) Kazuhiro Kokubo (JPN) 1600 (3) Autti 1360
  - Women's half-pipe: (gold) Xuetong Cai (CHN) 46.6 (silver) Zhifeng Sun (CHN) 42.7 (bronze) Xu Chen (CHN) 40.5
    - Halfpipe standings (after 4 of 12 events): (1) Cai 2240 (2) Sun 1805 (3) Chen 1390

==== Tennis ====
- Australian Open in Melbourne, Australia, day 5:
  - Men's singles – 3rd round:
    - Rafael Nadal (ESP) [2] def. Philipp Kohlschreiber (GER) [27] 6–4 6–2 2–6 7–5
    - Juan Martín del Potro (ARG) [4] def. Florian Mayer (GER) 6–3 0–6 6–4 7–5
    - Andy Murray (GBR) [5] def. Florent Serra (FRA) 7–5 6–1 6–4
    - Andy Roddick (USA) [7] def. Feliciano López (ESP) 6–7(4) 6–4 6–4 7–6(3)
  - Women's singles – 3rd round:
    - Dinara Safina (RUS) [2] def. Elena Baltacha (GBR) 6–1 6–2
    - Svetlana Kuznetsova (RUS) [3] def. Angelique Kerber (GER) 3–6 7–5 6–4
    - Alona Bondarenko (UKR) [31] def. Jelena Janković (SRB) [8] 6–2 6–3

=== January 21, 2010 (Thursday) ===
==== Biathlon ====
- World Cup 6 in Antholz-Anterselva, Italy:
  - 20 km Individual Men: (gold) Serguei Sednev (UKR) 54:06.7 (0 penalty minutes) (silver) Daniel Mesotitsch (AUT) 54:51.6 (2) (bronze) Alexis Bœuf (FRA) 55:01.0 (1)
    - Individual standings (after 3 of 4 races): (1) Christoph Sumann (AUT) 136 (2) Sednev 114 (3) Mesotitsch 99
    - Overall standings (after 12 of 25 events): (1) Evgeny Ustyugov (RUS) 412 (3) Emil Hegle Svendsen (NOR) 384 (3) Tim Burke (USA) 373

==== Cricket ====
- India in Bangladesh:
  - 1st Test in Chittagong, day 5:
    - India 243 and 413/8d; Bangladesh 242 and 301 (Mushfiqur Rahim 101). **India win by 113 runs, lead the 2-match series 1–0**.

==== Cycling ====
- UCI ProTour:
  - Tour Down Under in Australia:
    - Stage 3 – Unley to Stirling, 132.5 km (82.3 mi):
      - General classification:

==== Figure skating ====
- European Championships in Tallinn, Estonia:
  - Ice Dancing – standings after Original Dance: (1) Oksana Domnina/Maxim Shabalin (RUS) 104.27 (2) Federica Faiella/Massimo Scali (ITA) 99.15 (3) Jana Khokhlova/Sergei Novitski 96.46
  - Men: (gold) Evgeni Plushenko (RUS) 255.39 (silver) Stéphane Lambiel (SUI) 238.54 (bronze) Brian Joubert (FRA) 236.45
    - Plushenko wins his sixth European title.
- U.S. Championships in Spokane, Washington:
  - Senior Compulsory Dance: (1) Meryl Davis/Charlie White 45.42 (2) Tanith Belbin/Benjamin Agosto 45.02 (3) Kimberly Navarro/Brent Bommentre 37.60
  - Senior Ladies Short Program: (1) Mirai Nagasu 70.06 (2) Sasha Cohen 69.63 (3) Rachael Flatt 69.35

==== Football (soccer) ====
- African Cup of Nations in Angola: (teams in **bold** advance to the quarterfinals)
  - Group D:
    - Gabon 1–2 **Zambia**
    - **Cameroon** 2–2 Tunisia
      - Final standings: Zambia, Cameroon, Gabon 4 points, Tunisia 3.

==== Freestyle skiing ====
- World Cup in Lake Placid, United States:
  - Men's moguls: (gold) Guilbaut Colas (FRA) 26.51 (silver) Dale Begg-Smith (AUS) 25.95 (bronze) Jesper Bjoernlund (SWE) 25.44
    - Moguls standings (after 7 of 12 events): (1) Begg-Smith 555 (2) Bjoernlund 412 (3) Colas 370
  - Women's moguls: (gold) Hannah Kearney (USA) 25.13 (silver) Shannon Bahrke (USA) 24.96 (bronze) Heather McPhie (USA) 24.08
    - Moguls standings (after 7 of 12 events): (1) Jennifer Heil (CAN) 505 (2) McPhie 416 (3) Kearney 366

==== Futsal ====
- European Championship in Hungary: (teams in **bold** advance to the quarterfinals)
  - Group A: **Azerbaijan** 6–1 Czech Republic
    - Standings: Azerbaijan 6 points (2 matches), Hungary, Czech Republic 0 (1).
  - Group B: Belgium 2–4 **Ukraine**
    - Standings: **Italy**, Ukraine 3 points (1 match), Belgium 0 (2).

==== Handball ====
- European Men's Championship in Austria:
  - Group A in Graz:
    - Ukraine 25–28 Croatia
    - Norway 28–24 Russia
  - Group B in Linz:
    - Serbia 23–28 Denmark
    - Austria 37–37 Iceland

==== Rugby union ====
- Amlin Challenge Cup pool stage, matchday 6: (teams in **bold** advance to the quarterfinals)
  - Pool 4: Racing Métro (France) 19–17 (England) **London Wasps**
    - Standings: Wasps 23 points (6 matches), Racing Métro 16 (6), Bourgoin 14 (5), Rugby Roma Olimpic 0 (5).

==== Snowboarding ====
- World Cup in Stoneham, Canada:
  - Men's snowboard cross: (gold) Pierre Vaultier (FRA) (silver) Graham Watanabe (USA) (bronze) Shaun Palmer (USA)
    - Snowboard cross standings (after 5 of 12 races): (1) Vaultier 4800 (2) Watanabe 2120 (3) Nate Holland (USA) 1860
  - Women's snowboard cross: (gold) Maëlle Ricker (CAN) (silver) Helene Olafsen (NOR) (bronze) Dominique Maltais (CAN)
    - Snowboard cross standings (after 5 of 12 races): (1) Ricker 3960 (2) Olafsen 3050 (3) Maltais 2860

==== Tennis ====
- Australian Open in Melbourne, Australia, day 4:
  - Men's singles – 2nd round:
    - Roger Federer (SUI) [1] def. Victor Hănescu (ROU) 6–2 6–3 6–2
    - Novak Djokovic (SRB) [3] def. Marco Chiudinelli (SUI) 3–6 6–1 6–1 6–3
    - Nikolay Davydenko (RUS) [6] def. Illya Marchenko (UKR) 6–3 6–3 6–0
    - Fernando Verdasco (ESP) [9] def. Ivan Sergeyev (UKR) 6–1 6–2 6–2
    - Jo-Wilfried Tsonga (FRA) [10] def. Taylor Dent (USA) 6–4 6–3 6–3
  - Women's singles – 2nd round:
    - Serena Williams (USA) [1] def. Petra Kvitová (CZE) 6–2 6–1
    - Caroline Wozniacki (DEN) [4] def. Julia Görges (GER) 6–3 6–1
    - Venus Williams (USA) [6] def. Sybille Bammer (AUT) 6–2 7–5
    - Victoria Azarenka (BLR) [7] def. Stefanie Vögele (SUI) 6–4 6–0
    - Vera Zvonareva (RUS) [9] def. Iveta Benešová (CZE) 6–0 6–3
    - Agnieszka Radwańska (POL) [10] def. Alla Kudryavtseva (RUS) 6–0 6–2

=== January 20, 2010 (Wednesday) ===
==== Biathlon ====
- World Cup 6 in Antholz-Anterselva, Italy:
  - 15 km Individual Women: (gold) Magdalena Neuner (GER) 43:14.4 (3 penalty minutes) (silver) Kati Wilhelm (GER) 43:19.9 (1) (bronze) Andrea Henkel (GER) 43:41.8 (2)
    - Individual standings (after 3 of 4 races): (1) Helena Jonsson (SWE) 120 (2) Anna Carin Olofsson-Zidek (SWE) 108 (3) Henkel 102
    - Overall standings (after 12 of 25 races): (1) Helena Jonsson (SWE) 536 (2) Anna Carin Olofsson-Zidek (SWE) 435 (3) Wilhelm 404

==== Cricket ====
- India in Bangladesh:
  - 1st Test in Chittagong, day 4:
    - India 243 and 413/8d (Gautam Gambhir 116); Bangladesh 242 and 67/2. Bangladesh require another 348 runs with 8 wickets remaining.

==== Cycling ====
- UCI ProTour:
  - Tour Down Under in Australia:
    - Stage 2 – Gawler to Hahndorf, 133 km (83 mi):
      - General classification:

==== Figure skating ====
- European Championships in Tallinn, Estonia:
  - Men – Short Program: (1) Evgeni Plushenko (RUS) 91.30 (2) Brian Joubert (FRA) 88.55 (3) Yannick Ponsero (FRA) 82.40
    - Plushenko sets a World Record for the Short Program, an improvement of 0.64 point to his mark at the 2006 Winter Olympics.
  - Pairs: (gold) Yuko Kavaguti/Alexander Smirnov (RUS) 213.15 (silver) Aliona Savchenko/Robin Szolkowy (GER) 211.72 (bronze) Maria Mukhortova/Maxim Trankov (RUS) 202.03
    - Kavaguti/Smirnov win their first European title, upsetting three-times defending champions Savchenko/Szolkowy. They set a World Record for the Free Skating segment of 139.23, an improvement of 0.34 point to the old record of Shen Xue/ Zhao Hongbo (CHN).

==== Football (soccer) ====
- African Cup of Nations in Angola: (teams in **bold** advance to the quarterfinals)
  - Group C:
    - **Egypt** 2–0 Benin
    - **Nigeria** 3–0 Mozambique
      - Final standings: Egypt 9 points, Nigeria 6, Benin, Mozambique 1.
- 2011 Asian Cup qualification: (teams in **bold** advance to the final tournament)
  - Group A: Yemen 3–0 **Bahrain**
    - Standings (after five matches): Bahrain, **Japan** 12 points, Yemen 6, Hong Kong 0.

==== Freestyle skiing ====
- World Cup in Blue Mountain, Canada:
  - Men's skicross: (gold) Andreas Matt (AUT) (silver) Lars lewen (SWE) (bronze) Patrick Koller (AUT)
    - Skicross standings (after 6 of 12 events): (1) Michael Schmid (SUI) 390 (2) Xavier Kuhn (FRA) 271 (3) Matt 226
  - Women's skicross: (gold) Marte Hoeie Gjefsen (NOR) (silver) Ashleigh McIvor (CAN) (bronze) Sasa Faric (SLO)
    - Skicross standings (after 6 of 12 events): (1) Ophélie David (FRA) 415 (2) McIvor 387 (3) Julia Murray (CAN) 279

==== Futsal ====
- European Championship in Hungary:
  - Group C: Russia 5–1 Slovenia
  - Group D: Spain 9–1 Belarus

==== Handball ====
- European Men's Championship in Austria:
  - Group C in Innsbruck:
    - Slovenia 34–34 Germany
    - Poland 27–24 Sweden
  - Group D in Wiener Neustadt:
    - Czech Republic 20–21 France
    - Hungary 25–34 Spain

==== Tennis ====
- Australian Open in Melbourne, Australia, day 3:
  - Men's singles – 2nd round:
    - Rafael Nadal (ESP) [2] def. Lukáš Lacko (SVK) 6–2 6–2 6–2
    - Juan Martín del Potro (ARG) [4] def. James Blake (USA) 6–4 6–7(3) 5–7 6–3 10–8
    - Andy Murray (GBR) [5] def. Marc Gicquel (FRA) 6–1 6–4 6–3
    - Andy Roddick (USA) [7] def. Thomaz Bellucci (BRA) 6–3 6–4 6–4
  - Women's singles – 1st round:
    - Caroline Wozniacki (DEN) [4] def. Aleksandra Wozniak (CAN) 6–4, 6–0
    - Victoria Azarenka (BLR) [7] def. Stéphanie Cohen-Aloro (FRA) 6–2 6–0
    - Vera Zvonareva (RUS) [9] def. Kristína Kučová (SVK) 6–2 6–0
  - Women's singles – 2nd round:
    - Dinara Safina (RUS) [2] def. Barbora Záhlavová-Strýcová (CZE) 6–3 6–4
    - Svetlana Kuznetsova (RUS) [3] def. Anastasia Pavlyuchenkova (RUS) 6–2 6–2
    - Justine Henin (BEL) def. Elena Dementieva (RUS) [5] 7–5 7–6(6)
    - Jelena Janković (SRB) [8] def. Katie O'Brien (GBR) 6–2 6–2

=== January 19, 2010 (Tuesday) ===
==== Cricket ====
- India in Bangladesh:
  - 1st Test in Chittagong, day 3:
    - India 243 & 122/1 (22.2 ov); Bangladesh 242. India lead by 123 runs with 9 wickets remaining.

==== Cycling ====
- UCI ProTour:
  - Tour Down Under in Australia:
    - Stage 1 – Clare to Tanunda, 141 km (88 mi): (gold) André Greipel (GER) (Team HTC–Columbia) 3h 15' 30" (silver) Gert Steegmans (BEL) (Team RadioShack) s.t. (bronze) Jürgen Roelandts (BEL) (Omega Pharma–Lotto) s.t.
      - General classification: (1) Greipel 3h 15' 20" (2) Steegmans + 4" (3) Martin Kohler (SUI) (BMC Racing Team) + 4"

==== Figure skating ====
- European Championships in Tallinn, Estonia:
  - Ice Dancing – Compulsory Dance: (1) Oksana Domnina/Maxim Shabalin (RUS) 42.78 (2) Jana Khokhlova/Sergei Novitski (RUS) 37.87 (3) Federica Faiella/Massimo Scali (ITA) 37.47
  - Pairs – Short Program: (1) Aliona Savchenko/Robin Szolkowy (GER) 74.12 (2) Yuko Kavaguti/Alexander Smirnov (RUS) 73.92 (3) Maria Mukhortova/Maxim Trankov (RUS) 73.54

==== Football (soccer) ====
- African Cup of Nations in Angola: (teams in **bold** advance to the quarterfinals)
  - Group B: Burkina Faso 0–1 **Ghana**
    - Final standings: **Côte d'Ivoire** 4 points, Ghana 3, Burkina Faso 1.

==== Futsal ====
- European Championship in Hungary:
  - Group A: Hungary 1–3 Azerbaijan
  - Group B: Italy 4–0 Belgium

==== Handball ====
- European Men's Championship in Austria:
  - Group A in Graz:
    - Croatia 25–23 Norway
    - Russia 37–33 Ukraine
  - Group B in Linz:
    - Denmark 33–29 Austria
    - Iceland 29–29 Serbia
  - Group C in Innsbruck:
    - Germany 25–27 Poland
    - Sweden 25–27 Slovenia
  - Group D in Wiener Neustadt:
    - France 29–29 Hungary
    - Spain 37–25 Czech Republic

==== Tennis ====
- Australian Open in Melbourne, Australia, day 2:
  - Men's singles – 1st round:
    - Roger Federer (SUI) [1] def. Igor Andreev (RUS) 4–6, 6–2, 7–6(2), 6–0
    - Novak Djokovic (SRB) [3] def. Daniel Gimeno Traver (ESP) 7–5, 6–3, 6–2
    - Nikolay Davydenko (RUS) [6] def. Dieter Kindlmann (GER) 6–1, 6–0, 6–3
    - Marcel Granollers (ESP) def. Robin Söderling (SWE) [8] 5–7, 2–6, 6–4, 6–4, 6–2
    - Fernando Verdasco (ESP) [9] def. Carsten Ball (AUS) 6–7(4), 7–6(1), 7–5, 6–2
    - Jo-Wilfried Tsonga (FRA) [10] def. Sergiy Stakhovsky (UKR) 6–3, 6–4, 6–4
  - Women's singles – 1st round:
    - Serena Williams (USA) [1] def. Urszula Radwańska (POL) 6–2, 6–1
    - Venus Williams (USA) [6] def. Lucie Šafářová (CZE) 6–2, 6–2
    - Jelena Janković (SRB) [8] def. Monica Niculescu (ROU) 6–4, 6–0
    - Agnieszka Radwańska (POL) [10] def. Tatjana Malek (GER) 6–1, 6–0
    - In a 4-hour 19-minute marathon, the longest women's match by time in a Grand Slam event in the open era, Barbora Záhlavová-Strýcová (CZE) defeats Regina Kulikova (RUS) 7–6(5), 6–7(10), 6–3.

=== January 18, 2010 (Monday) ===
==== Cricket ====
- Pakistan in Australia:
  - 3rd Test in Hobart, day 5:
    - Australia 519/8d and 219/5d; Pakistan 301 and 206. **Australia win by 231 runs, and win the 3-match series 3–0**.
      - Australia get their 12th straight Test win over Pakistan, and equal the record winning streak of Sri Lanka over Bangladesh.
- India in Bangladesh:
  - 1st Test in Chittagong, day 2:
    - India 243 (Sachin Tendulkar 105*, Shahadat Hossain 5–71, Shakib Al Hasan 5–62); Bangladesh 59/3 (17.0 ov). Bangladesh trail by 184 runs with 7 wickets remaining in the 1st innings.
      - Tendulkar scores his 44th Test century.

==== Football (soccer) ====
- African Cup of Nations in Angola: (teams in **bold** advance to the quarterfinals)
  - Group A:
    - **Angola** 0–0 **Algeria**
    - Mali 3–1 Malawi
      - Final standings: Angola 5 points, Algeria, Mali 4 (Algeria advance on head-to-head), Malawi 3.

==== Tennis ====
- Australian Open in Melbourne, Australia, day 1:
  - Men's singles – 1st round:
    - Rafael Nadal (ESP) [2] def. Peter Luczak (AUS) 7–6(0), 6–1, 6–4
    - Juan Martín del Potro (ARG) [4] def. Michael Russell (USA) 6–4, 6–4, 3–6, 6–2
    - Andy Murray (GBR) [5] def. Kevin Anderson (RSA) 6–1, 6–1, 6–2
    - Andy Roddick (USA) [7] def. Thiemo de Bakker (NED) 6–1, 6–4, 6–4
  - Women's singles – 1st round:
    - Dinara Safina (RUS) [2] def. Magdaléna Rybáriková (SVK) 6–4, 6–4
    - Svetlana Kuznetsova (RUS) [3] def. Anastasia Rodionova (AUS) 6–1, 6–2
    - Elena Dementieva (RUS) [5] def. Vera Dushevina (RUS) 6–2, 6–1

=== January 17, 2010 (Sunday) ===
==== Alpine skiing ====
- Men's World Cup in Wengen, Switzerland:
  - Slalom: (gold) Ivica Kostelić (CRO) (silver) Andre Myhrer (SWE) (bronze) Reinfried Herbst (AUT)
    - Overall standings (after 20 of 34 races): (1) Carlo Janka (SUI) 757 points (2) Benjamin Raich (AUT) 739 (3) Didier Cuche (SUI) 526
    - Slalom standings (after 5 of 9 races): (1) Herbst 305 points (2) Julien Lizeroux (FRA) 286 (3) Kostelić 240
- Women's World Cup in Maribor, Slovenia:
  - Slalom: (gold) Kathrin Zettel (AUT) (silver) Tina Maze (SLO) (bronze) Maria Riesch (GER)
    - Overall standings (after 20 from 33 races): (1) Riesch 922 points (2) Lindsey Vonn (USA) 894 (3) Zettel 829
    - Slalom standings (after 7 from 8 races): (1) Riesch 433 points (2) Zettel 410 (3) Sandrine Aubert (FRA) 361

==== American football ====
- NFL Divisional Playoffs: (seedings in parentheses)
  - NFC: (2) Minnesota Vikings 34, (3) Dallas Cowboys 3
    - Brett Favre passes for four touchdowns, three of them to Sidney Rice, and leads the Vikings to the NFC Championship Game against the New Orleans Saints at the Superdome.
  - AFC: (5) New York Jets 17, (2) San Diego Chargers 14
    - Buoyed by 128 yards (including a 53-yard touchdown run) from Shonn Greene and three missed field goals by Nate Kaeding, the Jets will head to the AFC Championship Game next Sunday against the Indianapolis Colts at Lucas Oil Stadium. Philip Rivers throws for 298 yards and a touchdown for the Chargers, but was intercepted twice.

==== Badminton ====
- Korea Open Super Series in Seoul:
  - Men's singles: Lee Chong Wei (MAS)
  - Women's singles: Wang Shixian (CHN)
  - Men's doubles: Jung Jae Sung/Lee Yong Dae (KOR)
  - Women's doubles: Cheng Shu/Zhao Yunlei (CHN)
  - Mixed doubles: He Hanbin/Yu Yang (CHN)

==== Biathlon ====
- World Cup 5 in Ruhpolding, Germany:
  - 4 x 7.5 km Relay Men: (gold) Russia (Ivan Tcherezov, Anton Shipulin, Maxim Tchoudov, Evgeny Ustyugov) 1:22:29.8 (0 penalty loops+2 extra bullets) (silver) Norway (Halvard Hanevold, Tarjei Bø, Ole Einar Bjørndalen, Emil Hegle Svendsen) 1:22:58.4 (0+6) (bronze) Austria (Daniel Mesotitsch, Friedrich Pinter, Tobias Eberhard, Dominik Landertinger) 1:24:04.6 (1+9)
    - Standings (after 4 of 5 races): (1) Norway 208 points (2) Austria 199 (3) Russia 197

==== Bobsleigh ====
- World Cup in St. Moritz, Switzerland:
  - Four-man: (gold) André Lange, René Hoppe, Kevin Kuske, Martin Putze (GER) 2:10.13 (silver) Karl Angerer, Alex Mann, Andreas Bredau, Gregor Bermbach (GER) 2:10.38 (bronze) Alexandr Zubkov, Filipp Yegorov, Dmitry Trunenkov, Petr Moiseev (RUS) 2:10.48
    - Standings (after 6 of 8 races): (1) Steven Holcomb (USA) 1455 points (2) John Napier (USA) 1186 (3) Jānis Miņins (LAT) 1162

==== Cricket ====
- England in South Africa:
  - 4th Test in Johannesburg, day 4:
    - England 180 and 169 (42.5 ov); South Africa 423/7d. **South Africa win by an innings and 74 runs, 4-match series drawn 1–1**.
- Pakistan in Australia:
  - 3rd Test in Hobart, day 4:
    - Australia 519/8d & 219/5d (Simon Katich 100); Pakistan 301 & 103/4 (34.2 ov). Pakistan require another 335 runs with 6 wickets remaining.
      - Katich scores his ninth Test century, and Ricky Ponting scores 89 runs for a career-high aggregate of 298.
- India in Bangladesh:
  - 1st Test in Chittagong, day 1:
    - India 213/8 (63.0 ov)

==== Cross-country skiing ====
- World Cup in Otepää, Estonia:
  - Women's Sprint Classic: (gold) Hanna Falk (SWE) (silver) Petra Majdič (SLO) (bronze) Aino-Kaisa Saarinen (FIN)
    - Overall standings: (1) Justyna Kowalczyk (POL) 1221 points (2) Majdič 1113 (3) Saarinen 892
  - Men's Sprint Classic: (gold) Emil Jönsson (SWE) (silver) Ola Vigen Hattestad (NOR) (bronze) Nikita Kriukov (RUS)
    - Overall standings: (1) Petter Northug (NOR) 1060 points (2) Lukáš Bauer (CZE) 763 (3) Marcus Hellner (SWE) 627

==== Figure skating ====
- Canadian Championships in London, Ontario:
  - Senior Men: (gold) Patrick Chan 268.02 (silver) Vaughn Chipeur 222.10 (bronze) Kevin Reynolds 216.49
    - Chan wins the title for the third straight year.
- U.S. Championships in Spokane, Washington:
  - Senior Men: (gold) Jeremy Abbott 263.66 (silver) Evan Lysacek 238.63 (bronze) Johnny Weir 232.09
    - Abbott wins his second consecutive title.

==== Football (soccer) ====
- African Cup of Nations in Angola:
  - Group D:
    - Gabon 0–0 Tunisia
    - Cameroon 3–2 Zambia
      - Standings (after 2 matches): Gabon 4 points, Cameroon 3, Tunisia 2, Zambia 1.
- 2011 Asian Cup qualification: (teams in **bold** advance to the final tournament)
  - Group D: Vietnam 1–2 **China**
    - Standings: China PR 13 points (6 matches), **Syria** 11 (5), Vietnam 5 (6), Lebanon 1 (5).

==== Golf ====
- PGA Tour:
  - Sony Open in Hawaii in Honolulu, Hawaii:
    - Winner: Ryan Palmer (USA) 265 (−15)
      - In the first full-field event of the season, Palmer wins his third career title.
- European Tour:
  - Joburg Open in Johannesburg, South Africa:
    - Winner: Charl Schwartzel (RSA) 261 (−23)
      - Schwartzel sets a tournament record as he wins his second consecutive title and the 6th of his career.

==== Luge ====
- World Cup in Oberhof, Germany:
  - Men: (gold) Andi Langenhan (GER) 1:31.383 (silver) Johannes Ludwig (GER) 1:31.466 (bronze) Jan-Armin Eichhorn (GER) 1:31.477
    - Standings (after 7 of 8 races): (1) Armin Zöggeler (ITA) 605 points (2) Albert Demtschenko (RUS) 524 (3) David Möller (GER) 436
  - Teams: (gold) Germany (David Möller, Tatjana Hüfner, Patric Leitner/Alexander Resch) 2:29.779 (silver) Austria (Daniel Pfister, Nina Reithmayer, Andreas Linger/Wolfgang Linger) 2:30.258 (bronze) Italy (Armin Zöggeler, Sandra Gasparini, Christian Oberstolz/Patrick Gruber) 2:30.684
    - Final standings: (1) Germany 400 points (2) Austria 395 (3) Canada 341

==== Nordic combined ====
- World Cup in Chaux-Neuve, France:
  - HS100 / 10 km: (gold) Magnus Moan (NOR) 24:10.8 (silver) Jason Lamy-Chappuis (FRA) 24:11.8 (bronze) Mario Stecher (AUT) 24:24.4
    - Standings (after 13 of 19 events): (1) Lamy-Chappuis 869 points (2) Felix Gottwald (AUT) 589 (3) Moan 542

==== Rugby union ====
- Heineken Cup pool stage, matchday 5: (teams in **bold** advance to the quarterfinals; teams in italics assured of at least an Amlin Challenge Cup quarterfinal; teams in ~~strike~~ are eliminated from all European competition)
  - Pool 1: Northampton Saints (England) 34–0 (France) ~~Perpignan~~
    - Standings: Munster 20 points, Northampton Saints 18, Perpignan 6, ~~Benetton Treviso~~ 5.
  - Pool 5: **Toulouse** (France) 33–21 (England) ~~Harlequins~~
    - Standings: Toulouse 19 points, Sale Sharks 13 (5–4 on head-to-head competition points), Cardiff Blues 13, Harlequins 2.
  - Pool 6: Scarlets (Wales) 31–22 (England) London Irish
    - Standings: Leinster 20 points, London Irish 15, Scarlets 13, ~~Brive~~ 0.

==== Ski jumping ====
- World Cup in Sapporo, Japan:
  - HS 134: (gold) Simon Ammann (SUI) 293.1 points (139.5m/135.0m) (silver) Noriaki Kasai (JPN) 255.7 (131.0m/123.0m) (bronze) Martin Koch (AUT) 255.4 (136.0m/119.5m)
    - World Cup standings (after 14 of 23 events): (1) Ammann 939 points (2) Gregor Schlierenzauer (AUT) 796 (3) Andreas Kofler (AUT) 587

==== Speed skating ====
- World Sprint Championships in Obihiro, Japan:
  - Ladies' final classification: (gold) Lee Sang-hwa (KOR) 154.580 (silver) Sayuri Yoshii (JPN) 154.830 (bronze) Jenny Wolf (GER) 155.110
  - Men's final classification: (gold) Lee Kyou-hyuk (KOR) 139.910 (silver) Lee Kang-seok (KOR) 140.880 (bronze) Keiichiro Nagashima (JPN) 141.060

==== Snooker ====
- Masters in London, England:
  - Final: **Mark Selby** (ENG) (7) def. Ronnie O'Sullivan (ENG) (1) 10–9
    - Selby rallies from 6–9 down to win the title for the second time in three years.

==== Snowboarding ====
- World Cup in Nendaz, Switzerland:
  - Men's parallel giant slalom: (gold) Michael Lambert (CAN) (silver) Andreas Prommegger (AUT) (bronze) Benjamin Karl (AUT)
    - Standings (after 5 of 9 events): (1) Karl 3260 points (2) Jasey-Jay Anderson (CAN) 3200 (3) Lambert 2580
  - Women's parallel giant slalom: (gold) Ekaterina Tudegesheva (RUS) (silver) Nicolien Sauerbreij (NED) (bronze) Fraenzi Maegert-Kohli (SUI)
    - Standings (after 5 of 9 events): (1) Sauerbreij 2530 (2) Maegert-Kohli 2520 (3) Amelie Kober (GER) 2470

=== January 16, 2010 (Saturday) ===
==== Alpine skiing ====
- Men's World Cup in Wengen, Switzerland:
  - Downhill: (gold) Carlo Janka (SUI) (silver) Manuel Osborne-Paradis (CAN) (bronze) Marco Buechel (LIE)
    - Overall standings (after 19 of 34 races): (1) Janka 757 points (2) Benjamin Raich (AUT) 689 (3) Didier Cuche (SUI) 526
    - Downhill standings (after 5 of 8 races): (1) Cuche 296 points (2) Janka 284 (3) Osborne-Paradis 224
- Women's World Cup in Maribor, Slovenia:
  - Giant slalom: (gold) Kathrin Zettel (AUT) (silver) Maria Riesch (GER) (bronze) Anja Paerson (SWE)
    - Overall standings (after 19 from 33 races): (1) Lindsey Vonn (USA) 894 points (2) Riesch 862 (3) Zettel 729
    - Giant slalom standings (after 5 from 7 races): (1) Zettel 365 points (2) Kathrin Hölzl (GER) 331 (3) Tina Maze (SLO) 222

==== American football ====
- NFL Divisional Playoffs (seedings in parentheses):
  - NFC: (1) New Orleans Saints 45, (4) Arizona Cardinals 14
    - Reggie Bush scores two touchdowns – including an 83-yard punt return – and the Saints go marching into next Sunday's NFC Championship Game as the hosts.
  - AFC: (1) Indianapolis Colts 20, (6) Baltimore Ravens 3
    - Peyton Manning throws for two touchdowns and the Ravens commit six turnovers as the Colts advance to host next week's AFC Championship Game.

==== Auto racing ====
- Dakar Rally in Argentina and Chile, final standings:
  - Motorcycles: (gold) Cyril Despres (FRA) (KTM) 51h 10' 37" (silver) Pal Anders Ullevalseter (NOR) (KTM) 52h 13' 29" (bronze) Francisco López Contardo (CHI) (Aprilia) 52h 20' 25"
  - All-terrain vehicle (Quad): (gold) Marcos Patronelli (ARG) (Yamaha) 64h 17' 44" (silver) Alejandro Patronelli (ARG) (Yamaha) 66h 40' 43" (bronze) Juan Manuel González Corominas (ESP) (Yamaha) 69h 25' 15"
  - Cars: (gold) Carlos Sainz/Lucas Cruz (ESP) (Volkswagen) 47h 10' 00" (silver) Nasser Al-Attiyah (QAT)/Timo Gottschalk (GER) (Volkswagen) 47h 12' 12" (bronze) Mark Miller (USA)/Ralph Pitchford (RSA) (Volkswagen) 47h 42' 51"
  - Trucks: (gold) Vladimir Chagin/Sergey Savostin/Eduard Nikolaev (RUS) (Kamaz) 55h 04' 47" (silver) Firdaus Kabirov/Aydar Belyaev/Andrey Mokeev (RUS) (Kamaz) 56h 17' 55" (bronze) Marcel van Vliet/Herman Vaanholt/Gerard van Veenendaal (NED) (GINAF) 65h 48' 07"

==== Biathlon ====
- World Cup 5 in Ruhpolding, Germany:
  - 15 km Mass Start Men: (gold) Emil Hegle Svendsen (NOR) 39:19.5 (0 penalty loop) (silver) Evgeny Ustyugov (RUS) 39:24.6 (1) (bronze) Simon Eder (AUT) 39:29.4 (1)
    - Overall standings (after 11 of 25 events): (1) Ustyugov 412 points (2) Svendsen 384 (3) Simon Fourcade (FRA) 368
  - 12.5 km Mass Start Women: (gold) Helena Jonsson (SWE) 40:58.7 (0 penalty loops) (silver) Simone Hauswald (GER) 41:21.8 (2) (bronze) Magdalena Neuner (GER) 41:33.7 (5)
    - Overall standings (after 11 of 25 events): (1) Jonsson 536 points (2) Anna Carin Olofsson-Zidek (SWE) 435 (3) Svetlana Sleptsova (RUS) 357

==== Bobsleigh ====
- World Cup in St. Moritz, Switzerland:
  - Two-man: (gold) Lyndon Rush/Lascelles Brown (CAN) & André Lange/Kevin Kuske (GER) 2:12.34 (bronze) Edwin Van Calker/Sybren Jansma (NED) 2:12.48
    - Standings (after 7 of 8 races): (1) Ivo Rüegg (SUI) 1362 points (2) Thomas Florschütz (GER) 1291 (3) Karl Angerer (GER) 1282
  - Two-woman: (gold) Cathleen Martini/Romy Logsch (GER) 2:14.89 (silver) Sandra Kiriasis/Christin Senkel (GER) 2:14.90 (bronze) Claudia Schramm/Berit Wiacker (GER) 2:15.07
    - Standings (after 7 of 8 races): (1) Kiriasis 1432 (2) Kaillie Humphries (CAN) 1363 (3) Martini 1335

==== Cricket ====
- England in South Africa:
  - 4th Test in Johannesburg, day 3:
    - England 180 & 48/3 (13.2 ov); South Africa 423/7d. England trail by 195 runs with 7 wickets remaining.
- Pakistan in Australia:
  - 3rd Test in Hobart, day 3:
    - Australia 519/8d & 59/1 (18.0 ov); Pakistan 301 (Salman Butt 102). Australia lead by 277 runs with 9 wickets remaining.

==== Cross-country skiing ====
- World Cup in Otepää, Estonia:
  - Women's 10 km Classic: (gold) Justyna Kowalczyk (POL) 26:52.7 (silver) Marit Bjørgen (NOR) 26:56.9 (bronze) Aino-Kaisa Saarinen (FIN) 27:22.6
    - Overall standings: (1) Kowalczyk 1189 points (2) Petra Majdič (SLO) 1067 (3) Saarinen 849
  - Men's 15 km Classic: (gold) Lukáš Bauer (CZE) 36:45.7 (silver) Andrus Veerpalu (EST) 37:02.6 (bronze) Jaak Mae (EST) 37:27.3
    - Overall standings: (1) Petter Northug (NOR) 1060 points (2) Bauer 763 (3) Marcus Hellner (SWE) 627

==== Figure skating ====
- Canadian Championships in London, Ontario:
  - Senior Pairs: (gold) Jessica Dubé/Bryce Davison 198.27 (silver) Anabelle Langlois/Cody Hay 183.42 (bronze) Meagan Duhamel/Craig Buntin 172.18
    - Dubé and Davison win their third title.
  - Senior Women: (gold) Joannie Rochette 208.23 (silver) Cynthia Phaneuf 182.55 (bronze) Myriane Samson 151.10
    - Rochette wins the title for the sixth straight year.
  - Senior Ice Dancing: (gold) Tessa Virtue/Scott Moir 221.95 (silver) Vanessa Crone/Paul Poirier 184.70 (bronze) Kaitlyn Weaver/Andrew Poje 184.40
    - Virtue and Moir win their third straight title.
- U.S. Championships in Spokane, Washington:
  - Senior Pairs: (gold) Caydee Denney/Jeremy Barrett 190.30 (silver) Amanda Evora/Mark Ladwig 173.78 (bronze) Rena Inoue/John Baldwin 173.18
    - Denney and Barrett win their first national title.

==== Football (soccer) ====
- African Cup of Nations in Angola: (teams in **bold** advance to the quarterfinals)
  - Group C:
    - Nigeria 1–0 Benin
    - Mozambique 0–2 **Egypt**
      - Standings (after 2 matches): Egypt 6 points, Nigeria 3, Benin, Mozambique 1.

==== Freestyle skiing ====
- World Cup in Deer Valley, United States:
  - Men's moguls: (gold) Guilbaut Colas (FRA) (silver) Dale Begg-Smith (AUS) (bronze) Alexandre Bilodeau (CAN)
    - Standings (after 6 of 12 events): (1) Begg-Smith 475 points (2) Jesper Bjoernlund (SWE) 352 (3) Colas 270
  - Women's moguls: (gold) Jennifer Heil (CAN) (silver) Heather McPhie (USA) (bronze) Michelle Roark (USA)
    - Standings (after 6 of 12 events): (1) Heil 505 points (2) McPhie 356 (3) Kristi Richards (CAN) 272

==== Horse racing ====
- Zenyatta, unbeaten winner of the 2009 Breeders' Cup Classic, will not be retired as a broodmare as originally planned, but will race in 2010. (The Blood-Horse)

==== Luge ====
- World Cup in Oberhof, Germany:
  - Doubles: (gold) André Florschütz/Torsten Wustlich (GER) 1:25.567 (silver) Tobias Wendl/Tobias Arlt (GER) 1:25.633 (bronze) Patric Leitner/Alexander Resch (GER) 1:26.001
    - Standings (after 7 of 8 races): (1) Florschütz/Wustlich 542 points (2) Leitner/Resch 500 (3) Christian Oberstolz/Patrick Gruber (ITA) 462
  - Women: (gold) Tatjana Hüfner (GER) 1:25.936 (silver) Anke Wischnewski (GER) 1:26.203 (bronze) Natalie Geisenberger (GER) 1:26.322
    - Standings (after 7 of 8 races): (1) Hüfner 670 points (2) Geisenberger 610 (3) Wischnewski 470

==== Nordic combined ====
- World Cup in Chaux-Neuve, France:
  - HS100 / 10 km: (gold) Magnus Moan (NOR) 23:30.7 (silver) Jason Lamy-Chappuis (FRA) 23:34.9 (bronze) Todd Lodwick (USA) 23:37.8
    - Standings (after 12 of 19 events): (1) Lamy-Chappuis 789 points (2) Felix Gottwald (AUT) 553 (3) Tino Edelmann (GER) 480

==== Rugby union ====
- Heineken Cup pool stage, matchday 5: (teams in **bold** advance to the quarterfinals; teams in italics assured of at least an Amlin Challenge Cup quarterfinal; teams in ~~strike~~ are eliminated from all European competition)
  - Pool 1: ~~Benetton Treviso~~ (Italy) 7–44 (Ireland) Munster
    - Standings: Munster 20 points (5 matches), Northampton Saints 13 (4), Perpignan 6 (4), Benetton Treviso 5 (5).
  - Pool 2: Gloucester (England) 23–8 (France) **Biarritz**
    - Standings: Biarritz 18 points, Gloucester 12, Glasgow Warriors 9, ~~Newport Gwent Dragons~~ 6.
  - Pool 3:
    - Leicester Tigers (England) 47–8 (Italy) ~~Viadana~~
    - Clermont Auvergne (France) 27–7 (Wales) Ospreys
    - Standings: Leicester 17 points, Ospreys 16 (5–4 on head-to-head competition points), Clermont 16, Viadana 0.
  - Pool 4: Stade Français (France) 15–13 (England) ~~Bath~~
    - Standings: Stade Français 17 points, Ulster 13, Edinburgh 9, Bath 6.
  - Pool 5: Cardiff Blues (Wales) 36–19 (England) Sale Sharks
    - Standings: Toulouse 14 points (4 matches), Sharks 13 (5 matches; 5–4 on head-to-head competition points), Blues 13 (5), ~~Harlequins~~ 2 (4).
  - Pool 6: Leinster (Ireland) 27–10 (France) ~~Brive~~
    - Standings: Leinster 20 points (5 matches), London Irish 15 (4), Scarlets 8 (4), Brive 0 (5).
- Amlin Challenge Cup pool stage, matchday 5: (teams in **bold** advance to the quarterfinals, teams in ~~strike~~ are eliminated)
  - Pool 1: ~~Overmach Parma~~ (Italy) 16–38 (England) Leeds Carnegie
    - Standings: Leeds Carnegie, Bourgoin 19 points, ~~București Oaks~~ 6, Overmach Parma 4.
  - Pool 2: ~~Worcester Warriors~~ (England) 54–3 (Spain) ~~Olympus Madrid~~
    - Standings: **Connacht** 21 points, ~~Montpellier~~ 15, Worcester Warriors 12, Olympus Madrid 0.
  - Pool 4: ~~Bayonne~~ (France) 27–14 (France) ~~Racing Métro~~
    - Standings: **London Wasps** 22 points, Bayonne 14, Racing Métro 12, ~~Rugby Roma Olimpic~~ 0.
  - Pool 5: ~~Petrarca Padova~~ (Italy) 23–31 (France) Montauban
    - Standings: Newcastle Falcons 19 points, Montauban 17, ~~Albi~~ 11, Petrarca Padova 1.

==== Ski jumping ====
- World Cup in Sapporo, Japan:
  - HS 134: (gold) Thomas Morgenstern (AUT) 271.5 points (131.5m/131.0m) (silver) Andreas Wank (GER) 267.5 (126.0m/136.5m) (bronze) Daiki Ito (JPN) 266.3 (133.5m/128.0m)
    - World Cup standings (after 13 of 23 events): (1) Simon Ammann (SUI) 839 points (2) Gregor Schlierenzauer (AUT) 796 (3) Andreas Kofler (AUT) 587

==== Speed skating ====
- World Sprint Championships in Obihiro, Japan:
  - Ladies' classification (after day 1): (1) Lee Sang-hwa (KOR) 77.080 (2) Sayuri Yoshii (JPN) 77.370 (3) Jenny Wolf (GER) 77.470
  - Men's classification (after day 1): (1) Lee Kyou-hyuk (KOR) 69.940 (2) Ronald Mulder (NED) 70.480 (3) Keiichiro Nagashima (JPN) 70.505

==== Tennis ====
- ATP World Tour:
  - Medibank International Sydney in Sydney, Australia:
    - Final: **Marcos Baghdatis** (CYP) def. Richard Gasquet (FRA) 6–4, 7–6(2).
      - Baghdatis wins the fourth title of his career.
  - Heineken Open in Auckland, New Zealand:
    - Final: **John Isner** (USA) def. Arnaud Clément (FRA) 6–3, 5–7, 7–6(2)
      - Isner wins his first career title.
- WTA Tour:
  - Moorilla Hobart International in Hobart, Australia:
    - Final: **Alona Bondarenko** (UKR) def. Shahar Pe'er (ISR) 6–2, 6–4
      - Bondarenko wins the second WTA Tour title of her career.
- Exhibition tournaments:
  - AAMI Classic in Melbourne, Australia:
    - Final: **Fernando Verdasco** (ESP) def. Jo-Wilfried Tsonga (FRA) 7–5, 6–3

=== January 15, 2010 (Friday) ===
==== Alpine skiing ====
- Men's World Cup in Wengen, Switzerland:
  - Super combined: (gold) Bode Miller (USA) (silver) Carlo Janka (SUI) (bronze) Silvan Zurbriggen (SUI)
    - Overall standings (after 18 of 34 races): (1) Benjamin Raich (AUT) 689 points (2) Janka 657 (3) Aksel Lund Svindal (NOR) 486
    - Combined standings (after 3 of 4 races): (1) Raich 186 points (2) Janka 180 (3) Miller 145

==== Biathlon ====
- World Cup 5 in Ruhpolding, Germany:
  - 4 x 6 km Relay Women: (gold) Sweden (Elisabeth Högberg, Anna Carin Olofsson-Zidek, Anna Maria Nilsson, Helena Jonsson) 1:17:31.5 (0 penalty, 6 reloads) (silver) Russia (Iana Romanova, Anna Boulygina, Olga Medvedtseva, Olga Zaitseva) 1:17:48.1 (0, 8) (bronze) Norway (Liv Kjersti Eikeland, Ann Kristin Flatland, Solveig Rogstad, Tora Berger) 1:18:00.5 (0, 6)
    - Standings (after 4 of 5 events): (1) Russia 228 points (2) Germany 200 (3) Sweden 191

==== Cricket ====
- England in South Africa:
  - 4th Test in Johannesburg, day 2:
    - England 180; South Africa 215/2 (63.2 ov, Graeme Smith 105). South Africa lead by 35 runs with 8 wickets remaining in the 1st innings.
- Pakistan in Australia:
  - 3rd Test in Hobart, day 2:
    - Australia 519/8d (Ricky Ponting 209, Michael Clarke 166); Pakistan 94/4 (36.0 ov). Pakistan trail by 425 runs with 6 wickets remaining in the 1st innings.
      - Ponting scores his fifth Test double-century and the highest score by an Australian batsman in five years, while Clarke makes his highest Test score.

==== Figure skating ====
- Canadian Championships in London, Ontario:
  - Senior Women Short Program: (1) Cynthia Phaneuf 66.30 (2) Joannie Rochette 64.15 (3) Amélie Lacoste 53.99
  - Senior Pairs Short Program: (1) Anabelle Langlois/Cody Hay 65.47 (2) Jessica Dubé/Bryce Davison 62.87 (3) Meagan Duhamel/Craig Buntin 62.38
  - Senior Ice Dancing – standings after Original Dance: (1) Tessa Virtue/Scott Moir 114.13 (2) Kaitlyn Weaver/Andrew Poje 94.79 (3) Vanessa Crone/Paul Poirier 94.77
  - Senior Men Short Program: (1) Patrick Chan 90.14 (2) Vaughn Chipeur 78.87 (3) Joey Russell 74.04
- U.S. Championships in Spokane, Washington:
  - Senior Pairs Short Program: (1) Caydee Denney/Jeremy Barrett 63.01 (2) Caitlin Yankowskas/John Coughlin 62.09 (3) Amanda Evora/Mark Ladwig 58.76
  - Senior Men Short Program: (1) Jeremy Abbott 87.85 (2) Evan Lysacek 83.69 (3) Johnny Weir 83.51

==== Football (soccer) ====
- African Cup of Nations in Angola: (teams in **bold** advance to the quarterfinals)
  - Group B: **Ivory Coast** 3–1 Ghana
    - Standings: Côte d'Ivoire 4 points (2 matches), Burkina Faso 1 (1), Ghana 0 (1).

==== Freestyle skiing ====
- World Cup in Deer Valley, United States:
  - Men's aerials: (gold) Anton Kushnir (BLR) (silver) Qi Guangpu (CHN) (bronze) Dmitri Dashinski (BLR)
    - Standings after 4 of 6 events: (1) Kushnir 340 points (2) Jia Zongyang (CHN) 236 (3) Qi 185
  - Women's aerials: (gold) Lydia Lassila (AUS) (silver) Xu Mengtao (CHN) (bronze) Nina Li (CHN)
    - Standings after 4 of 6 events: (1) Guo Xinxin (CHN) 290 points (2) Xu 269 (3) Nina 256

==== Rugby union ====
- Heineken Cup pool stage, matchday 5: (teams in ~~strike~~ are eliminated)
  - Pool 2: Glasgow Warriors (Scotland) 29–25 (Wales) ~~Newport Gwent Dragons~~
    - Standings: Biarritz 18 points (4 matches), Glasgow Warriors 9 (5), Gloucester 8 (4), Newport Gwent Dragons 6 (5).
  - Pool 4: Ulster (Ireland) 21–13 (Scotland) Edinburgh
    - Standings: Ulster 13 points (5 matches), Stade Français 13 (4), Edinburgh 9 (5), Bath 6 (4).
- Amlin Challenge Cup pool stage, matchday 5: (teams in **bold** advance to the quarterfinals, teams in ~~strike~~ are eliminated)
  - Pool 2: **Connacht** 20–10 (France) ~~Montpellier~~
    - Standings: Connacht 21 points (5 matches), Montpellier 15 (5), ~~Worcester Warriors~~ 7 (4), ~~Olympus Madrid~~ 0 (4).
  - Pool 3: ~~Castres Olympique~~ (France) 47–0 (Italy) ~~Rovigo~~
    - Standings: Toulon 18 points, Saracens 17, Castres Olympique 11, Rovigo 0.
  - Pool 5: ~~Albi~~ (France) 14–16 (England) Newcastle Falcons
    - Standings: Newcastle Falcons 19 points (5 matches), Montauban 12 (4), Albi 11 (5), Petrarca Padova 1 (4).

==== Skeleton ====
- World Cup in St. Moritz, Switzerland:
  - Men: (gold) Eric Bernotas (USA) 1:09.15 (silver) Kristan Bromley (GBR) 1:09.22 (bronze) Martins Dukurs (LAT) 1:09.33
    - Standings after 7 of 8 events: (1) Dukurs 1469 points (2) Sandro Stielicke (GER) 1270 (3) Frank Rommel (GER) 1256
  - Women: (gold) Shelley Rudman (GBR) 2:20.42 (silver) Mellisa Hollingsworth (CAN) 2:20.46 (bronze) Kerstin Szymkowiak (GER) 2:20.68
    - Standings after 7 of 8 events: (1) Hollingsworth 1446 points (2) Rudman 1412 (3) Szymkowiak 1364

==== Snowboarding ====
- World Cup in Veysonnaz, Switzerland:
  - Men's snowboard cross: (gold) Pierre Vaultier (FRA) (silver) David Speiser (GER) (bronze) Nick Baumgartner (USA)
    - Standings after 5 of 8 events: (1) Vaultier 3800 points (2) Nate Holland (USA) 1740 (3) Robert Fagan (CAN) 1620
  - Women's snowboard cross: (gold) Helene Olafsen (NOR) (silver) Dominique Maltais (CAN) (bronze) Maëlle Ricker (CAN)
    - Standings after 5 of 8 events: (1) Ricker 2960 points (2) Maltais 2260 (3) Olafsen 2250

==== Tennis ====
- WTA Tour:
  - Medibank International Sydney in Sydney, Australia:
    - Final: **Elena Dementieva** (RUS) def. Serena Williams (USA) 6–3, 6–2
      - Dementieva wins this tournament for the second straight year and her 15th career title.

=== January 14, 2010 (Thursday) ===
==== Basketball ====
- Euroleague Regular Season Game 10: (teams in **bold** advance to the Top 16 stage, teams in ~~strike~~ are eliminated)
  - Group A:
    - **Cibona Zagreb** (Croatia) 73–71 (France) ~~ASVEL Villeurbanne~~
    - ~~Fenerbahçe Ülker İstanbul~~ (Turkey) 68–76 (Lithuania) **Žalgiris Kaunas**
    - **Regal FC Barcelona** (Spain) 85–70 (Italy) **Montepaschi Siena**
      - Final standings: Regal FC Barcelona 10–0, Montepaschi Siena 8–2, Žalgiris Kaunas, Cibona Zagreb, ASVEL Villeurbanne, Fenerbahçe Ülker 3–7.
      - Barcelona become the first team to go through the Regular Season unbeaten since CSKA Moscow in 2004–05.
  - Group C:
    - **Maroussi Athens** (Greece) 83–75 (Israel) **Maccabi Tel Aviv**
    - ~~Lottomatica Roma~~ (Italy) 69–48 (Slovenia) ~~Union Olimpija Ljubljana~~
    - **CSKA Moscow** (Russia) 84–83 (Spain) **Caja Laboral Baskonia**
      - Final standings: CSKA Moscow 8–2, Caja Laboral Baskonia 7–3, Maccabi Tel Aviv 6–4, Maroussi Athens, Lottomatica Roma 4–6, Union Olimpija Ljubljana 1–9.

==== Biathlon ====
- World Cup 5 in Ruhpolding, Germany:
  - 10 km Sprint Men: (gold) Emil Hegle Svendsen (NOR) 23:27.5 (0 penalties) (silver) Ole Einar Bjørndalen (NOR) 23:30.7 (0) (bronze) Michael Greis (GER) 24:01.0 (0)
    - Overall standings (after 10 of 25 races): (1) Evgeny Ustyugov (RUS) 358 points (2) Simon Fourcade (FRA) 341 (3) Tim Burke (USA) 339
    - Sprint standings (after 5 of 10 races): (1) Bjørndalen 201 points (2) Greis 191 (3) Svendsen 186

==== Cricket ====
- England in South Africa:
  - 4th Test in Johannesburg, day 1:
    - England 180 (47.5 ov, Dale Steyn 5–51); South Africa 29/0 (12.0 ov). South Africa trail by 151 runs with 10 wickets remaining in the 1st innings.
- Pakistan in Australia:
  - 3rd Test in Hobart, day 1:
    - Australia 302/3 (90.0 ov, Ricky Ponting 137*, Michael Clarke 111*).
      - Ponting scores his 39th Test century, and together with Clarke they make a 231-run partnership, their highest in two years.

==== Figure skating ====
- Canadian Championships in London, Ontario:
  - Senior Compulsory Dance: (1) Tessa Virtue/Scott Moir 43.98 (2) Vanessa Crone/Paul Poirier 37.27 (3) Kaitlyn Weaver/Andrew Poje 36.87

==== Football (soccer) ====
- African Cup of Nations in Angola:
  - Group A:
    - Mali 0–1 Algeria
    - Angola 2–0 Malawi
      - Standings (after 2 matches): Angola 4 points, Malawi, Algeria 3, Mali 1.

==== Freestyle skiing ====
- World Cup in Deer Valley, United States:
  - Men's moguls: (gold) Dale Begg-Smith (AUS) (silver) Guilbaut Colas (FRA) (bronze) Dmitriy Reiherd (KAZ)
    - Standings (after 5 of 12 events): (1) Begg-Smith 395 points (2) Jesper Bjoernlund (SWE) 326 (3) Alexandre Bilodeau (CAN) 205
  - Women's moguls: (gold) Jennifer Heil (CAN) & Heather McPhie (USA) (bronze) Shannon Bahrke (USA)
    - Standings (after 5 of 12 events): (1) Heil 405 points (2) Hannah Kearney (USA) 276 (3) Kristi Richards (CAN) 236

==== Rugby union ====
- Amlin Challenge Cup pool stage, matchday 5: (teams in ~~strike~~ are eliminated)
  - Pool 1: Bourgoin (France) 33–15 (Romania) ~~București Oaks~~
    - Standings: Bourgoin 19 points (5 matches), Leeds Carnegie 14 (4), București Oaks 6 (5), ~~Overmach Parma~~ 4 (4).
  - Pool 3: Saracens (England) 28–9 (France) Toulon
    - Standings: Toulon 18 points (5 matches), Saracens 17 (5), ~~Castres Olympique~~ 6 (4), ~~Rovigo~~ 0 (4).
  - Pool 4: London Wasps (England) 50–16 (Italy) ~~Rugby Roma Olimpic~~
    - Standings: London Wasps 22 points (5 matches), Racing Métro 12 (4), ~~Bayonne~~ 10 (4), Rugby Roma Olimpic 0 (5).

=== January 13, 2010 (Wednesday) ===
==== Basketball ====
- Euroleague Regular Season Game 10: (teams in **bold** advance to the Top 16 stage, teams in ~~strike~~ are eliminated)
  - Group B:
    - ~~Entente Orléans Loiret~~ (France) 60–75 (Turkey) **Efes Pilsen Istanbul**
    - ~~Lietuvos Rytas Vilnius~~ (Lithuania) 71–73 (Spain) **Unicaja Málaga**
    - **Olympiacos Piraeus** (Greece) 81–60 (Serbia) **Partizan Belgrade**
      - Final standings: Olympiacos Piraeus 8–2, Unicaja Málaga 7–3, Partizan Belgrade 5–5, Efes Pilsen Istanbul, Lietuvos Rytas Vilnius 4–6, Entente Orléans Loiret 2–8.
  - Group D:
    - **Asseco Prokom Gdynia** (Poland) 75–70 (Russia) **Khimki Moscow Region**
    - ~~Armani Jeans Milano~~ (Italy) 66–75 (Spain) **Real Madrid**
    - ~~EWE Baskets Oldenburg~~ (Germany) 64–67 (Greece) **Panathinaikos Athens**
      - Final standings: Real Madrid, Panathinaikos Athens 8–2, Khimki Moscow Region 6–4, Asseco Prokom Gdynia 4–6, Armani Jeans Milano 3–7, EWE Baskets Oldenburg 1–9.

==== Biathlon ====
- World Cup 5 in Ruhpolding, Germany:
  - 7.5 km Sprint Women: (gold) Anna Carin Olofsson-Zidek (SWE) 23:49.6 (0 penalty loops) (silver) Olga Medvedtseva (RUS) 24:19.4 (0) (bronze) Magdalena Neuner (GER) 24:30.2 (2)
    - Overall standings (after 10 of 25 races): (1) Helena Jonsson (SWE) 476 points (2) Olofsson-Zidek 412 (3) Svetlana Sleptsova (RUS) 357
    - Sprint standings (after 5 of 10 races): (1) Olofsson-Zidek 207 points (2) Jonsson 206 (3) Medvedtseva 192

==== Cricket ====
- Tri-series in Bangladesh:
  - Final in Mirpur:
    - India 245 (48.2 overs, Suresh Raina 106); Sri Lanka 249/6 (48.3 overs). **Sri Lanka win by 4 wickets**.

==== Football (soccer) ====
- African Cup of Nations in Angola:
  - Group D:
    - Cameroon 0–1 Gabon
    - Zambia 1–1 Tunisia

==== Freestyle skiing ====
- World Cup in Alpe d'Huez, France:
  - Men's skicross: (gold) Christopher Delbosco (CAN) (silver) Tomas Krauz (CZE) (bronze) Ted Piccard (FRA)
    - Standings after 5 of 12 events: (1) Michael Schmid (SUI) 340 points (2) Xavier Kuhn (FRA) 257 (3) Audun Groenvold (NOR) 216
  - Women's skicross: (gold) Kelsey Serwa (CAN) (silver) Ophélie David (FRA) (bronze) Ashleigh McIvor (CAN)
    - Standings after 5 of 12 events: (1) David 370 points (2) McIvor 307 (3) Julia Murray (CAN) 253

=== January 12, 2010 (Tuesday) ===
==== Alpine skiing ====
- Women's World Cup in Flachau, Austria:
  - Slalom: (gold) Marlies Schild (AUT) (silver) Maria Riesch (GER) (bronze) Kathrin Zettel (AUT)
    - Overall standings after 18 from 33 races: (1) Lindsey Vonn (USA) 894 points (2) Riesch 782 (3) Zettel 629
    - Slalom standings after 6 from 8 races: (1) Riesch 373 points (2) Schild 320 (3) Sandrine Aubert (FRA) 316

==== Football (soccer) ====
- African Cup of Nations in Angola:
  - Group C:
    - Egypt 3–1 Nigeria
    - Mozambique 2–2 Benin

=== January 11, 2010 (Monday) ===
==== Baseball ====
- Mark McGwire, tied for eighth on Major League Baseball's career home run list, admits to having used steroids for a decade, including in 1998 when he set the single-season home run record. (ESPN)

==== Cricket ====
- Tri-series in Bangladesh:
  - 6th Match in Mirpur:
    - Bangladesh 247/6 (50 overs); India 249/4 (43 overs, Virat Kohli 102*). **India win by 6 wickets**.
      - Final standings: India 13 points, Sri Lanka 12, Bangladesh 0.

==== Football (soccer) ====
- African Cup of Nations in Angola:
  - Group A: Malawi 3–0 Algeria
  - Group B: Ivory Coast 0–0 Burkina Faso

=== January 10, 2010 (Sunday) ===
==== Alpine skiing ====
- Men's World Cup in Adelboden, Switzerland:
  - Slalom: (gold) Julien Lizeroux (FRA) (silver) Marcel Hirscher (AUT) (bronze) Ivica Kostelić (CRO)
    - Overall standings (after 17 of 34 races): (1) Benjamin Raich (AUT) 639 points (2) Carlo Janka (SUI) 577 (3) Didier Cuche (SUI) 476
    - Slalom standings (after 4 of 9 races): (1) Reinfried Herbst (AUT) 245 points (2) Lizeroux 241 (3) Silvan Zurbriggen (SUI) 150
- Women's World Cup in Haus im Ennstal, Austria:
  - Super-G: (gold) Lindsey Vonn (USA) (silver) Anja Paerson (SWE) (bronze) Nadia Fanchini (ITA) & Martina Schild (SUI)
    - Overall standings (after 17 of 33 races): (1) Vonn 894 points (2) Maria Riesch (GER) 702 (3) Kathrin Zettel (AUT) 569
    - Super-G standings (after 3 of 7 races): (1) Vonn 240 points (2) Nadia Styger (SUI) 145 (3) Elisabeth Görgl (AUT) 136

==== American football ====
- NFL Wild Card Weekend (seeds in parentheses):
  - AFC: (6) Baltimore Ravens 33, (3) New England Patriots 14
    - The Patriots suffer their worst home playoff loss since 1978 as Ray Rice begins the game with an 88-yard touchdown run and the Ravens score 24 first quarter points.
  - NFC: (4) Arizona Cardinals 51, (5) Green Bay Packers 45 (OT)
    - Karlos Dansby scores the Cardinals' winning touchdown on a 17-yard fumble return, after the Packers rally from a 21-point deficit to tie the score in regulation time. The game sets NFL playoff records for total points (96) and touchdowns (13). In a losing effort, Aaron Rodgers becomes the 12th quarterback in history to pass for 400 yards in a postseason game.

==== Biathlon ====
- World Cup 4 in Oberhof, Germany:
  - 12.5 km Mass Start Women: (gold) Andrea Henkel (GER) 40:53.6 (2 penalty loops) (silver) Helena Jonsson (SWE) 41:17.0 (2) (bronze) Tora Berger (NOR) 41:33.9 (2)
    - Overall standings (after 9 of 25 events): (1) Jonsson 450 points (2) Anna Carin Olofsson-Zidek (SWE) 352 (3) Svetlana Sleptsova (RUS) 337
  - 15 km Mass Start Men: (gold) Ole Einar Bjørndalen (NOR) 38:57.3 (1 penalty loop) (silver) Tim Burke (USA) 40:00.2 (2) (bronze) Tomasz Sikora (POL) 40:37.9 (3)
    - Bjørndalen wins his third event of the season from six starts.
    - Overall standings (after 9 of 25 events): (1) Burke 329 points (2) Evgeny Ustyugov (RUS) 326 (3) Simon Fourcade (FRA) 301

==== Bobsleigh ====
- World Cup in Königssee, Germany:
  - Four-man: (gold) André Lange, René Hoppe, Kevin Kuske, Martin Putze (GER) 1:37.07 (silver) Steven Holcomb, Justin Olsen, Steve Mesler, Curtis Tomasevicz (USA) 1:37.10 (bronze) John Napier, Charles Berkeley, Steven Langton, Christopher Fogt (USA) 1:37.31
    - Standings (after 6 of 8 races): (1) Holcomb 1263 points (2) Jānis Miņins (LAT) 1130 (3) Lyndon Rush (CAN) 1057

==== Cricket ====
- Tri-series in Bangladesh:
  - 5th Match in Mirpur:
    - Sri Lanka 213 (46.1 overs); India 214/2 (32.4 overs). **India win by 8 wickets**.
      - Standings: Sri Lanka 12 points (4 matches), India 9 (3), Bangladesh 0 (3).
      - Sri Lanka and India advance to the final.

==== Cross-country skiing ====
- Tour de Ski:
  - Stage 8 in Val di Fiemme, Italy:
    - Women's 9 km Freestyle Handicap, Final Climb: (gold) Kristin Størmer Steira (NOR) 35:49.8 (silver) Riitta-Liisa Roponen (FIN) 35:52.8 (bronze) Yevgeniya Medvedeva (RUS) 35:53.7
      - Final Tour de Ski standings: (gold) Justyna Kowalczyk 2:37:54.5 (POL) (silver) Petra Majdič (SLO) 2:38:13.7 (bronze) Arianna Follis (ITA) 2:39:06.7
      - World Cup overall standings: (1) Kowalczyk 1089 points (2) Majdič 1022 (3) Aino-Kaisa Saarinen (FIN) 789
    - Men's 10 km Freestyle Handicap, Final Climb: (gold) Lukáš Bauer (CZE) 33:43.4 (silver) Marcus Hellner (SWE) 33:45.8 (bronze) Jean-Marc Gaillard (FRA) 33:45.9
      - Final Tour de Ski standings: (gold) Bauer 4:13:10.6 (silver) Petter Northug (NOR) 4:14:27.0 (bronze) Dario Cologna (SUI) 4:14:42.8
      - World Cup overall standings: (1) Northug 1060 points (2) Bauer 663 (3) Hellner 627

==== Darts ====
- BDO World Darts Championship in Frimley Green, England:
  - Men's final: **Martin Adams** (ENG) def. Dave Chisnall (ENG) 7–5
    - Adams wins the title for the second time in four years.

==== Football (soccer) ====
- African Cup of Nations in Angola:
  - Group A: Angola 4–4 Mali
    - Mali rally from 4-goal deficit with 12 minutes remaining and score two goals in injury time.

==== Freestyle skiing ====
- World Cup in Calgary, Canada:
  - Men's aerials: (gold) Jia Zongyang (CHN) (silver) Anton Kushnir (BLR) (bronze) Alexei Grishin (BLR)
    - Standings after 3 of 6 events: (1) Kushnir 240 points (2) Jia 236 (3) Timofei Slivets (BLR) 112
  - Women's aerials: (gold) Li Nina (CHN) (silver) Evelyne Leu (SUI) (bronze) Guo Xinxin (CHN)
    - Standings after 3 of 6 events: (1) Guo 240 points (2) Li 196 (3) Xu Mengtao (CHN) 189

==== Golf ====
- PGA Tour:
  - SBS Championship in Kapalua, Hawaii:
    - Winner: Geoff Ogilvy (AUS) 270 (−22)
      - Ogilvy wins the event for the second straight year, giving him seven PGA Tour wins in all.
- European Tour:
  - Africa Open in East London, South Africa:
    - Winner: Charl Schwartzel (RSA) 272 (−20)
      - Schwartzel wins his fourth European Tour title.

==== Luge ====
- World Cup in Winterberg, Germany:
  - Women: (gold) Natalie Geisenberger (GER) 1:53.179 (silver) Tatjana Hüfner (GER) 1:53.189 (bronze) Erin Hamlin (USA) 1:53.329
    - Standings (after 6 of 8 races): (1) Hüfner 570 points (2) Geisenberger 540 (3) Anke Wischnewski (GER) 385
  - Teams: (gold) Germany (Johannes Ludwig, Tatjana Hüfner, Tobias Wendl/Tobias Arlt) 2:25.827 (silver) Austria (Wolfgang Kindl, Nina Reithmayer, Andreas Linger/Wolfgang Linger) 2:26.392 (bronze) United States (Bengt Walden, Erin Hamlin, Mark Grimmette/Brian Martin) 2:26.663
    - Standings (after 4 of 5 races): (1) Austria 310 points (2) Germany 300 (3) Canada 295

==== Nordic combined ====
- World Cup in Val di Fiemme, Italy:
  - HS134 / 10 km: (gold) Bill Demong (USA) 33:49.9 (silver) Todd Lodwick (USA) 34:05.2 (bronze) Eric Frenzel (GER) 34:14.0
    - Standings (after 11 of 19 events): (1) Jason Lamy-Chappuis (FRA) 709 points (2) Felix Gottwald (AUT) 533 (3) Tino Edelmann (GER) 480

==== Short track speed skating ====
- World Junior Championships in Taipei City, Chinese Taipei:
  - Men's final overall standings: (gold) Noh Jinkyu (KOR) 68 points (silver) Antoine Gelinas-Beaulieu (CAN) 63 (bronze) Park Seyeong (KOR) 47
  - Women's final overall standings: (gold) Choi Jihyun (KOR) 115 points (silver) Lee Mi-Yeon (KOR) 68 (bronze) Song Jaewon (KOR) 42

==== Skeleton ====
- World Cup in Königssee, Germany:
  - Team:

==== Ski jumping ====
- World Cup in Tauplitz-Bad Mitterndorf, Austria:
  - HS 200 (Ski flying): (gold) Gregor Schlierenzauer (AUT) 401.7 points (203.0m/205.0m) (silver) Robert Kranjec (SLO) 392.6 (198.5m/204.5m) (bronze) Harri Olli (FIN) 388.0 (199.5m/200.5m)
    - World Cup standings (after 12 of 23 events): (1) Schlierenzauer 796 points (2) Simon Ammann (SUI) 794 (3) Andreas Kofler (AUT) 587

==== Snowboarding ====
- World Cup in Bad Gastein, Austria:
  - Men's snowboard cross: (gold) Nate Holland (USA) (silver) Pierre Vaultiern (FRA) (bronze) Mario Fuchs (AUT)
    - Standings after 4 of 7 events: (1) Vaultier 2800 points (2) Robert Fagan (USA) 1490 (3) Holland 1480
  - Women's snowboard cross: (gold) Lindsey Jacobellis (USA) (silver) Helene Olafsen (NOR) (bronze) Sandra Frei (SUI)
    - Standings after 4 of 7 events: (1) Maëlle Ricker (CAN) 2360 points (2) Jacobellis 1530 (3) Dominique Maltais (CAN) 1460

==== Speed skating ====
- European Championships in Hamar, Norway:
  - Men's overall standings: (gold) Sven Kramer (NED) 150.227 points (silver) Enrico Fabris (ITA) 150.776 (bronze) Ivan Skobrev (RUS) 152.178
    - Kramer becomes the first ever skater to win the title four straight times.
  - Women's overall standings: (gold) Martina Sáblíková (CZE) 162.825 points (silver) Ireen Wüst (NED) 164.204 (bronze) Daniela Anschütz-Thoms (GER) 165.343
    - Sáblíková wins the title for the second time in four years.

==== Tennis ====
- ATP World Tour:
  - Brisbane International in Brisbane, Australia:
    - Final: **Andy Roddick** (USA) def. Radek Štěpánek (CZE) 7–6(2), 7–6(7)
      - Roddick wins his 28th career title.
  - Chennai Open in Chennai, India:
    - Final: **Marin Čilić** (CRO) def. Stanislas Wawrinka (SUI) 7–6(2), 7–6(3)
      - Čilić wins this tournaments for the second straight year, and his fourth title overall.

=== January 9, 2010 (Saturday) ===
==== Alpine skiing ====
- Men's World Cup in Adelboden, Switzerland:
  - Giant slalom: Cancelled due bad weather.
- Women's World Cup in Haus im Ennstal, Austria:
  - Downhill: (gold) Lindsey Vonn (USA) (silver) Nadja Kamer (SUI) (bronze) Ingrid Jacquemod (FRA)
    - Overall standings (after 16 of 33 races): (1) Vonn 794 points (2) Maria Riesch (GER) 695 (3) Kathrin Zettel (AUT) 569
    - Downhill standings (after 4 of 8 races): (1) Vonn 400 points (2) Riesch 236 (3) Anja Paerson (SWE) 215

==== American football ====
- NFL Wild Card Weekend (seeds in parentheses):
  - AFC: (5) New York Jets 24, (4) Cincinnati Bengals 14
    - The Bengals become the first victims of the postseason as Mark Sanchez goes 12 of 15 for 182 yards to secure the Jets' victory in a rematch of their "Win and in" game from Week 17.
  - NFC: (3) Dallas Cowboys 34, (6) Philadelphia Eagles 14
    - The Cowboys pick up their first playoff win since 1996, scoring on five straight second-quarter drives to defeat the Eagles for the second week in a row, and hand them their third loss to Dallas this season.

==== Biathlon ====
- World Cup 4 in Oberhof, Germany:
  - 10 km Sprint Men: (gold) Evgeny Ustyugov (RUS) 28:45.0 (0 penalties) (silver) Michael Greis (GER) 28:47.8 (1) (bronze) Carl Johan Bergman (SWE) 28:53.2 (0)
    - Overall standings after 8 of 25 events: (1) Ustyugov 283 points (2) Tim Burke (USA) 275 (3) Simon Fourcade (FRA) 265
    - Sprint standings after 4 of 10 events: (1) Ole Einar Bjørndalen (NOR) 147 points (2) Ustyugov 146 (3) Greis 143

==== Bobsleigh ====
- World Cup in Königssee, Germany:
  - Two-man: (gold) Thomas Florschütz/Richard Adjei (GER) 1:38.17 (silver) André Lange/Kevin Kuske (GER) 1:38.22 (bronze) Beat Hefti/Thomas Lamparter (SUI) 1:38.23
    - Standings (after 6 of 8 races): (1) Ivo Rüegg (SUI) 1202 points (2) Florschütz 1115 (3) Karl Angerer (GER) 1090
  - Two-woman: (gold) Cathleen Martini/Romy Logsch (GER) 1:41.04 (silver) Kaillie Humphries/Heather Moyse (CAN) 1:41.33 (bronze) Sandra Kiriasis/Christin Senkel (GER) 1:41.43
    - Standings (after 6 of 8 races): (1) Kiriasis 1222 (2) Humphries 1171 (3) Helen Upperton (CAN) 1122

==== Cross-country skiing ====
- Tour de Ski:
  - Stage 7 in Val di Fiemme, Italy:
    - Women's 10 km Classic Mass Start: (gold) Petra Majdič (SLO) 34:06.4 (silver) Elena Kolomina (KAZ) 34:06.5 (bronze) Marianna Longa (ITA) 34:07.4
      - Standings (after 7 of 8 stages): (1) Majdič 2:01:08.3 (2) Justyna Kowalczyk (POL) 2:01:39.7 (3) Arianna Follis (ITA) 2:02:04.8
    - Men's 20 km Classic Mass Start: (gold) Lukáš Bauer (CZE) 59:03.5 (silver) Petter Northug (NOR) 59:35.0 (bronze) Axel Teichmann (GER) 59:35.8
      - Standings (after 7 of 8 stages): (1) Northug 3:39:18.9 (2) Bauer 3:39:27.2 (3) Teichmann (GER) 3:40:49.2

==== Football (soccer) ====
- African Cup of Nations:
  - Togo withdraws from the tournament following the attack on the team bus yesterday, in which three people were killed and nine injured, including two players.

==== Freestyle skiing ====
- World Cup in Calgary, Canada:
  - Men's moguls: (gold) Dale Begg-Smith (AUS) (silver) Alexandre Bilodeau (CAN) (bronze) Alexandr Smyshlyaev (RUS)
    - Standings (after 4 of 12 events): (1) Begg-Smith 295 points (2) Jesper Bjoernlund (SWE) 281 (3) Bilodeau 205
  - Women's moguls: (gold) Jennifer Heil (CAN) (silver) Aiko Uemura (JPN) (bronze) Nicola Sudova (CZE)
    - Standings (after 4 of 12 events): (1) Heil 305 points (2) Kristi Richards (CAN) 223 (3) Sudova 222
- World Cup in Les Contamines, France:
  - Men's skicross: (gold) Xavier Kuhn (FRA) (silver) Stanley Hayer (CAN) (bronze) Tomas Krauz (CZE)
    - Standings (after 4 of 12 events): (1) Michael Schmid (SUI) 295 points (2) Kuhn 225 (3) Audun Groenvold (NOR) 180
  - Women's skicross: (gold) Ashleigh McIvor (CAN) (silver) Julia Murray (CAN) (bronze) Karin Huttary (AUT)
    - Standings (after 4 of 12 events): (1) Ophélie David (FRA) 290 points (2) McIvor 247 (3) Murray 203

==== Luge ====
- World Cup in Winterberg, Germany:
  - Doubles: (gold) Christian Oberstolz/Patrick Gruber (ITA) 1:28.597 (silver) Gerhard Plankensteiner/Oswald Haselrieder (ITA) 1:28.805 (bronze) Patric Leitner/Alexander Resch (GER) 1:28.990
    - Standings (after 6 of 8 races): (1) André Florschütz/Torsten Wustlich (GER) 442 points (2) Oberstolz/Gruber 440 (3) Leitner/Resch 430
  - Men: (gold) Armin Zöggeler (ITA) 1:47.601 (silver) Albert Demtschenko (RUS) 1:47.621 (bronze) David Möller (GER) 1:47.652
    - Standings (after 6 of 8 races): (1) Zöggeler 555 points (2) Demtschenko 464 (3) Möller 381

==== Nordic combined ====
- World Cup in Val di Fiemme, Italy:
  - HS134 / 10 km: (gold) Felix Gottwald (AUT) 24:44.5 (silver) Magnus Moan (NOR) 24:45.3 (bronze) Eric Frenzel (GER) 24:46.5
    - Standings (after 10 of 19 events): (1) Jason Lamy-Chappuis (FRA) 673 points (2) Gottwald 483 (3) Tino Edelmann (GER) 480

==== Ski jumping ====
- World Cup in Tauplitz-Bad Mitterndorf, Austria:
  - HS 200 (Ski flying): (gold) Robert Kranjec (SLO) 382.5 points (195.0m/200.0m) (silver) Simon Ammann (SUI) 382.0 (195.0m/200.0m) (bronze) Martin Koch (AUT) 270.2 (192.0m/201.5m)
    - World Cup standings (after 11 of 23 events): (1) Ammann 749 points (2) Gregor Schlierenzauer (AUT) 696 (3) Andreas Kofler (AUT) 561

==== Tennis ====
- ATP World Tour:
  - Qatar ExxonMobil Open in Doha, Qatar:
    - Final: **Nikolay Davydenko** (RUS) def. Rafael Nadal (ESP) 0–6, 7–6(8), 6–4
      - Davydenko wins his 20th career title.
- WTA Tour:
  - Brisbane International in Brisbane, Australia:
    - Final: **Kim Clijsters** (BEL) def. Justine Henin (BEL) 6–3, 4–6, 7–6(6)
      - Clijsters wins her 36th career title and denies Henin a win on her first tournament since May 2008.
  - ASB Classic in Auckland, New Zealand:
    - Final: **Yanina Wickmayer** (BEL) def. Flavia Pennetta (ITA) 6–3, 6–2
      - Wickmayer wins her third career WTA Tour title.
- Hopman Cup in Perth, Australia:
  - Final: **Spain** def. Great Britain 2–1
    - Laura Robson (GBR) def. María José Martínez Sánchez (ESP) 6–1, 7–6(2)
    - Tommy Robredo (ESP) def. Andy Murray (GBR) 1–6, 6–4, 6–3
    - Martínez Sánchez/Robredo (ESP) def. Robson/Murray (GBR) 7–6(6), 7–5
      - Spain win the title for the third time.
- Exhibition tournaments:
  - Hong Kong Tennis Classic in Causeway Bay, Hong Kong:
    - Final: **Team Russia** def. Team Europe 2–1
      - Yevgeny Kafelnikov (RUS) def. Stefan Edberg (SWE) 7–5, 6–4
      - Maria Sharapova (RUS) def. Caroline Wozniacki (DEN) 7–5, 6–3
      - Wozniacki/Edberg (EUR) def. Vera Zvonareva/Kafelnikov (RUS) 6–4, 6–3

=== January 8, 2010 (Friday) ===
==== Alpine skiing ====
- Women's World Cup in Haus im Ennstal, Austria:
  - Downhill: (gold) Lindsey Vonn (USA) (silver) Anja Paerson (SWE) (bronze) Maria Riesch (GER)
    - Overall standings (after 15 of 33 races): (1) Vonn 694 points (2) Riesch 659 (3) Kathrin Zettel (AUT) 569
    - Downhill standings (after 3 of 8 races): (1) Vonn 300 points (2) Riesch 200 (3) Paerson 170

==== Biathlon ====
- World Cup 4 in Oberhof, Germany:
  - 7.5 km Sprint Women: (gold) Simone Hauswald (GER) 22:15.1 (0 penalties) (silver) Helena Jonsson (SWE) 22:23.8 (1) (bronze) Ann Kristin Flatland (NOR) 22:32.6 (0)
    - Overall standings after 8 of 25 events: (1) Jonsson 396 points (2) Anna Carin Olofsson-Zidek (SWE) 323 (3) Svetlana Sleptsova (RUS) 312
    - Sprint standings after 4 of 10 events: (1) Jonsson 180 points (2) Kati Wilhelm (GER) 157 (3) Sleptsova 155

==== Cricket ====
- Tri-series in Bangladesh:
  - 4th Match in Mirpur:
    - Bangladesh 249/9 (50 overs); Sri Lanka 252/1 (42.5 overs, Upul Tharanga 118*, Mahela Jayawardene 108). **Sri Lanka win by 9 wickets**.
      - Standings: Sri Lanka 12 points (3 matches), India 4 (2), Bangladesh 0 (3).
      - Sri Lanka advance to the final.

==== Darts ====
- BDO World Darts Championship in Frimley Green, England:
  - Women's final: Trina Gulliver (ENG) def. Rhian Edwards (WAL) 2–0
    - Gulliver wins the title for the eighth time.

==== Freestyle skiing ====
- World Cup in Calgary, Canada:
  - Men's moguls: (gold) Dale Begg-Smith (AUS) (silver) Vincent Marquis (CAN) (bronze) Alexandr Smyshlyaev (RUS)
    - Standings (after 3 of 12 events): (1) Jesper Bjoernlund (SWE) 245 points (2) Begg-Smith 195 (3) Bryon Wilson (USA) 160
  - Women's moguls: (gold) Jennifer Heil (CAN) (silver) Nicola Sudova (CZE) (bronze) Margarita Marbler (AUT)
    - Standings (after 3 of 12 events): (1) Kristi Richards (CAN) 220 points (2) Heil 205 (3) Hannah Kearney (USA) 184

==== Skeleton ====
- World Cup in Königssee, Germany:
  - Men: (gold) Martins Dukurs (LAT) 1:35.29 (silver) Sandro Stielicke (GER) 1:35.63 (bronze) Frank Rommel (GER) 1:35.84
    - Standings after 6 of 8 events: (1) Dukurs 1269 points (2) Rommel 1211 (3) Stielicke 1102
  - Women: (gold) Mellisa Hollingsworth (CAN) 1:38.26 (silver) Kerstin Szymkowiak (GER) 1:38.50 (bronze) Shelley Rudman (GBR) 1:38.73
    - Standings after 6 of 8 events: (1) Hollingsworth 1236 points (2) Rudman 1187 (3) Szymkowiak 1164

=== January 7, 2010 (Thursday) ===
==== American football ====
- NCAA bowl games:
  - 2010 Citi BCS National Championship Game in Pasadena, California:
    - (1) Alabama 37, (2) Texas 21
      - The Crimson Tide are declared unanimous national champions since they also topped the Associated Press season-ending poll. Mark Ingram II, who rushes for 116 yards and two touchdowns, becomes the fifth player in history to win the Heisman Trophy and national championship in the same season. Nick Saban becomes the only coach since 1936 to win national championships with two different schools.

==== Basketball ====
- Euroleague Regular Season Game 9: (teams in **bold** advance to the Top-16 stage, teams in ~~strike~~ are eliminated)
  - Group A:
    - Žalgiris Kaunas (Lithuania) 68–61 (Croatia) Cibona Zagreb
    - ASVEL Villeurbanne (France) 64–90 (Spain) **Regal FC Barcelona**
      - Standings: Regal FC Barcelona 9–0, **Montepaschi Siena** 8–1, ASVEL Villeurbanne, Fenerbahçe Ülker 3–6, Cibona Zagreb, Žalgiris Kaunas 2–7.
  - Group B:
    - Efes Pilsen Istanbul (Turkey) 85–93 (OT) (Greece) **Olympiacos Piraeus**
    - **Unicaja Málaga** (Spain) 72–88 (France) ~~Entente Orléans Loiret~~
      - Standings: Olympiacos Piraeus 7–2, Unicaja Málaga 6–3, **Partizan Belgrade** 5–4, Lietuvos Rytas Vilnius 4–5, Efes Pilsen Istanbul 3–6, Entente Orléans Loiret 2–7.
  - Group C:
    - **Maccabi Tel Aviv** (Israel) 79–59 (Italy) Lottomatica Roma
    - ~~Union Olimpija Ljubljana~~ (Slovenia) 77–80 (OT) (Russia) **CSKA Moscow**
      - Standings: CSKA Moscow, **Caja Laboral Baskonia** 7–2, Maccabi Tel Aviv 6–3, Maroussi Athens, Lottomatica Roma 3–6, Union Olimpija Ljubljana 1–8.
  - Group D:
    - **Khimki Moscow Region** (Russia) 79–63 (Italy) Armani Jeans Milano
      - Standings: **Real Madrid**, **Panathinaikos Athens** 7–2, Khimki Moscow Region 6–3, Armani Jeans Milano, Asseco Prokom Gdynia 3–6, ~~EWE Baskets Oldenburg~~ 1–8.

==== Biathlon ====
- World Cup 4 in Oberhof, Germany:
  - 4 x 7.5 km Relay Men: (gold) Norway (Halvard Hanevold, Tarjei Bø, Emil Hegle Svendsen, Ole Einar Bjørndalen) 1:17:03.3 (0 penalty loops+7 extra bullets) (silver) France (Vincent Jay, Vincent Defrasne, Simon Fourcade, Martin Fourcade) 1:17:30.8 (0+7) (bronze) Germany (Christoph Stephan, Michael Greis, Arnd Peiffer, Simon Schempp) 1:17:45.5 (0+9)
    - Standings after 3 of 5 races: (1) France 157 points (2) Norway 154 (3) Austria 151

==== Cricket ====
- England in South Africa:
  - 3rd Test in Cape Town, day 5:
    - South Africa 291 and 447/7d; England 273 and 296/9. **Match drawn, England lead the 4-match series 1–0**.
- Tri-series in Bangladesh:
  - 3rd Match in Mirpur:
    - Bangladesh 296/6 (50 ov); India 297/4 (47.3 ov, MS Dhoni 101*). **India win by 6 wickets**.
      - Standings: Sri Lanka 8 points, India 4, Bangladesh 0.

==== Cross-country skiing ====
- Tour de Ski:
  - Stage 6 in Toblach, Italy:
    - Women's 5 km Classic: (gold) Justyna Kowalczyk (POL) 12:37.6 (silver) Aino-Kaisa Saarinen (FIN) 12:49.2 (bronze) Petra Majdič (SLO) 12:52.4
      - Standings (after 6 of 8 stages): (1) Kowalczyk 1:27:32.8 (2) Majdič 1:27:46.9 (3) Arianna Follis (ITA) 1:27:56.0
    - Men's 10 km Classic: (gold) Daniel Rickardsson (SWE) 23:14.5 (silver) Lukáš Bauer (CZE) 23:16.2 (bronze) Petter Northug (NOR) 23:20.7
      - Standings (after 6 of 8 stages): (1) Northug 2:40:48.9 (2) Marcus Hellner (SWE) 2:41:09.0 (3) Axel Teichmann (GER) 2:41:18.4

==== Snowboarding ====
- World Cup in Kreischberg, Austria:
  - Men's half-pipe: (gold) Daisuke Murakami (JPN) (silver) Patrick Burgener (SUI) (bronze) Tore Viken Holvik (NOR)
    - Standings after 3 of 6 events: (1) Kazuhiro Kokubo (JPN) 1600 points (2) Kohei Kudo (JPN) 1140 (3) Murakami 1110
  - Women's half-pipe: (gold) Šárka Pančochová (CZE) (silver) Sun Zhifeng (CHN) (bronze) Chen Xu (CHN)
    - Standings after 3 of 6 events: (1) Cai Xuetong (CHN) 1240 (2) Pancochova 1100 (3) Sophie Rodriguez (FRA) 1050

=== January 6, 2010 (Wednesday) ===
==== Alpine skiing ====
- Men's World Cup in Zagreb, Croatia:
  - Slalom: (gold) Giuliano Razzoli (ITA) (silver) Manfred Mölgg (ITA) (bronze) Julien Lizeroux (FRA)
    - Overall standings (after 16 of 34 races): (1) Benjamin Raich (AUT) 589 points (2) Carlo Janka (SUI) 575 (3) Didier Cuche (SUI) 476
    - Slalom standings (after 3 of 9 races): (1) Reinfried Herbst (AUT) 245 points (2) Lizeroux 141 (3) Razzoli 140

==== American football ====
- NCAA bowl games:
  - GMAC Bowl in Mobile, Alabama:
    - Central Michigan 44, Troy 41 (2 OT)
- NFL news:
  - The Washington Redskins name Mike Shanahan, former Super Bowl winning coach of the Denver Broncos, as their new head coach, signing a five-year contract.

==== Baseball ====
- MLB news:
  - Andre Dawson is elected to the Hall of Fame. For the first time in history, two players fall less than 10 votes short of induction in the same election—Bert Blyleven, 5 votes short, and Roberto Alomar, 8 votes short. Alomar also receives the highest percentage of votes ever for a first-time candidate who was not elected to the Hall.

==== Basketball ====
- Euroleague Regular Season Game 9: (teams in **bold** advance to the Top-16 stage, teams in ~~strike~~ are eliminated)
  - Group A:
    - **Montepaschi Siena** (Italy) 101–58 (Turkey) Fenerbahçe Ülker İstanbul
  - Group B:
    - **Partizan Belgrade** (Serbia) 97–67 (Lithuania) Lietuvos Rytas Vilnius
  - Group C:
    - **Caja Laboral Baskonia** (Spain) 73–65 (Greece) Maroussi Athens
  - Group D:
    - **Panathinaikos Athens** (Greece) 74–66 (Poland) Asseco Prokom Gdynia
    - **Real Madrid** (Spain) 73–60 (Germany) ~~EWE Baskets Oldenburg~~

==== Biathlon ====
- World Cup 4 in Oberhof, Germany:
  - 4 x 6 km Relay Women: (gold) Russia (Anna Bogaliy-Titovets, Anna Boulygina, Olga Medvedtseva, Svetlana Sleptsova) 1:14:23.6 (0 penalty, 8 reloads) (silver) Germany (Martina Beck, Simone Hauswald, Tina Bachmann, Andrea Henkel) 1:14:23.9 (0, 11) (bronze) France (Marie-Laure Brunet, Sylvie Becaert, Marie Dorin, Sandrine Bailly) 1:15:24.5 (0, 8)
    - Standings (after 3 of 5 events): (1) Russia 174 points (2) Germany 157 (3) France 150

==== Cricket ====
- England in South Africa:
  - 3rd Test in Cape Town, day 4:
    - South Africa 291 and 447/7d (Graeme Smith 183); England 273 and 132/3 (51.0 ov). England need another 334 runs with 7 wickets remaining.
- Pakistan in Australia:
  - 2nd Test in Sydney, day 4:
    - Australia 127 and 381 (Michael Hussey 134*); Pakistan 333 and 139 (Nathan Hauritz 5–53). **Australia win by 36 runs, lead the 3-match series 2–0**.
      - Australia win their 11th successive Test against Pakistan and secure the series win, as they become the sixth team in history to win a Test after trailing by more than 200 runs on the first innings.

==== Cross-country skiing ====
- Tour de Ski:
  - Stage 5 from Cortina d'Ampezzo to Toblach, Italy:
    - Women's 16 km Freestyle Handicap start: (gold) Arianna Follis (ITA) 34:34.8 (silver) Petra Majdič (SLO) + 3.4 (bronze) Justyna Kowalczyk (POL) + 4.1
      - Standings (after 5 of 8 stages): (1) Follis 1:14:51.1 (2) Majdič + 0.4 (3) Kowalczyk + 4.1
    - Men's 36 km Freestyle Handicap start: (gold) Petter Northug (NOR) 1:25:38.0 (silver) Dario Cologna (SUI) + 0.4 (bronze) Marcus Hellner (SWE) + 0.8
      - Standings (after 5 of 8 stages): (1) Northug 2:17:28.2 (2) Cologna + 0.4 (3) Hellner + 1.2

==== Football (soccer) ====
- 2011 Asian Cup qualification, matchday 5: (teams in **bold** qualify for the final tournament)
  - Group A:
    - Yemen 2–3 **Japan**
    - **Bahrain** 4–0 Hong Kong
      - Standings: Bahrain 12 points (4 matches), Japan 12 (5), Yemen 3 (4), Hong Kong 0 (5).
  - Group B:
    - Indonesia 1–2 Oman
    - Kuwait 2–2 Australia
      - Standings: Kuwait, Australia 8 points, Oman 7, Indonesia 3.
  - Group C:
    - **United Arab Emirates** 1–0 Malaysia
      - Standings: **Uzbekistan** 9 points (3 matches), UAE 6 (3), Malaysia 0 (4).
  - Group D:
    - **China** 0–0 **Syria**
    - Lebanon 1–1 Vietnam
      - Standings: Syria 11 points, China 10, Vietnam 5, Lebanon 1.
  - Group E:
    - Singapore 1–3 **Iran**
    - Thailand 0–0 Jordan
      - Standings: Iran 10 points, Thailand, Singapore 6, Jordan 5.

==== Ski jumping ====
- Four Hills Tournament:
  - World Cup in Bischofshofen, Austria:
    - HS 140: (gold) Thomas Morgenstern (AUT) 264.7 points (133.0m/136.0m) (silver) Janne Ahonen (FIN) 264.0 (134.0m/133.5m) (bronze) Simon Ammann (SUI) 261.5 (136.0m/131.5m)
      - Four Hills Tournament final standings: (gold) Andreas Kofler (AUT) 1027.2 points (silver) Gregor Schlierenzauer (AUT) 1013.9 (bronze) Wolfgang Loitzl (AUT) 1011.6
      - World Cup standings (after 10 of 23 events): (1) Ammann 669 points (2) Schlierenzauer 651 (3) Kofler 521

==== Snowboarding ====
- World Cup in Kreischberg, Austria:
  - Men's parallel giant slalom: (gold) Jasey Jay Anderson (CAN) (silver) Andreas Prommegger (AUT) (bronze) Benjamin Karl (AUT)
    - Standings (after 4 of 9 events): (1) Anderson 3050 points (2) Karl 2660 (3) Mathieu Bozzetto (FRA) 1700
  - Women's parallel giant slalom: (gold) Nicolien Sauerbreij (NED) (silver) Alexa Loo (CAN) (bronze) Fraenzi Maegert-Kohli (SUI)
    - Standings (after 4 of 9 events): (1) Amelie Kober (GER) 2180 (2) Doris Guenther (AUT) 1990 (3) Maegert-Kohli 1920

=== January 5, 2010 (Tuesday) ===
==== American football ====
- NCAA bowl games:
  - FedEx Orange Bowl in Miami Gardens, Florida:
    - (10) Iowa 24, (9) Georgia Tech 14

==== Cricket ====
- England in South Africa:
  - 3rd Test in Cape Town, day 3:
    - South Africa 291 & 312/2 (80.0 ov, Graeme Smith 162*); England 273 (Morné Morkel 5–75). South Africa lead by 330 runs with 8 wickets remaining.
      - Smith scores his 19th Test century and becomes the second captain in history to score 6000 Test runs.
- Pakistan in Australia:
  - 2nd Test in Sydney, day 3:
    - Australia 127 and 286/8; Pakistan 333. Australia lead by 80 runs with 2 wickets remaining.
- Tri-series in Bangladesh:
  - 2nd Match in Mirpur:
    - India 279/9 (50 ov, Chanaka Welegedara 5–66); Sri Lanka 283/5 (48 ov, Thilan Samaraweera 105*). **Sri Lanka win by 5 wickets**.
      - Standings: Sri Lanka 8 points (2 matches), India, Bangladesh 0 (1).

==== Freestyle skiing ====
- World Cup in St. Johann in Tirol/Oberndorf, Austria:
  - Men's skicross: (gold) Simon Stickl (GER) (silver) Daron Rahlves (USA) (bronze) David Duncan (CAN)
    - Standings (after 3 of 12 events): (1) Michael Schmid (SUI) 250 points (2) Audun Groenvold (NOR) 166 (3) Stickl 140
  - Women's skicross: (gold) Ophélie David (FRA) (silver) Méryll Boulangeat (FRA) (bronze) Julia Murray (CAN)
    - Standings (after 3 of 12 events): (1) David 240 points (2) Anna Holmlund (SWE) 200 (3) Ashleigh McIvor (CAN) 147

==== Ice hockey ====
- World Junior Championships in Saskatoon, Saskatchewan, Canada:
  - Gold medal game: (silver) Canada 5–6 (OT) (gold) United States
    - John Carlson scores 4:31 minutes into overtime to give the title to USA for the second time and stop Canada's championships streak at five and their winning streak at 15. Jordan Eberle, who scores twice in the last 3 minutes of regulation time to send the game to overtime, is named the MVP of the championships.
  - Bronze medal game: Switzerland 4–11 (bronze) Sweden
    - The Tre Kronor score the most goals in a bronze medal game in championships history.

=== January 4, 2010 (Monday) ===
==== American football ====
- NCAA bowl games:
  - Tostitos Fiesta Bowl in Glendale, Arizona:
    - (6) Boise State 17, (4) TCU 10
      - The Broncos win the first ever BCS bowl game other than the National Championship Game between two unbeaten teams, at the same site of the game that put them on the national map, and finish unbeaten for the second time in four seasons.
- NFL news:
  - The Washington Redskins, who ended the 2009 season at 4–12, fire head coach Jim Zorn and his entire staff.
  - The Buffalo Bills relieve interim coach Perry Fewell and his staff of their duties; Fewell will apply to become permanent head coach after filling in following Dick Jauron's sacking in November.

==== Cricket ====
- England in South Africa:
  - 3rd Test in Cape Town, day 2:
    - South Africa 291 (Jacques Kallis 108, James Anderson 5–63); England 241/7 (82.0 ov). England trail by 50 runs with 3 wickets remaining in the 1st innings.
- Pakistan in Australia:
  - 2nd Test in Sydney, day 2:
    - Australia 127; Pakistan 331/9 (96.0 ov). Pakistan lead by 204 runs with 1 wicket remaining in the 1st innings.
- Tri-series in Bangladesh:
  - 1st Match in Mirpur:
    - Bangladesh 260/7 (50 ov); Sri Lanka 261/3 (44.5 ov, Tillakaratne Dilshan 104). **Sri Lanka win by 7 wickets**.

==== Cross-country skiing ====
- Tour de Ski:
  - Stage 4 in Prague, Czech Republic:
    - Women's Sprint Freestyle: (gold) Natalya Korostelyova (RUS) 2:45.7 (silver) Celine Brun-Lie (NOR) + 0.9 (bronze) Alena Procházková (SVK) + 2.2
      - Standings (after 4 of 8 stages): (1) Aino-Kaisa Saarinen (FIN) 40:16.3 (2) Justyna Kowalczyk (POL) + 24.9 (3) Petra Majdič (SLO) + 29.7
    - Men's Sprint Freestyle: (gold) Emil Jönsson (SWE) 2:26.5 (silver) Marcus Hellner (SWE) + 1.4 (bronze) Simen Østensen (NOR) + 3.0
      - Standings (after 4 of 8 stages): (1) Jönsson 51:50.2 (2) Hellner + 43.8 (3) Østensen + 44.3

==== Ice hockey ====
- World Junior Championships in Saskatoon, Saskatchewan, Canada:
  - Relegation round:
    - Slovakia 2–5 Czech Republic
    - Latvia 6–4 Austria
      - Final standings: Czech Republic 9 points, Slovakia 6, Latvia 3, Austria 0.
  - 5th place: Russia 3–4 Finland

==== Tennis ====
- WTA Tour:
  - Brisbane International in Brisbane, Australia:
    - Justine Henin (BEL) makes a comeback to the Tour after 20-months retirement and defeats #2 seed Nadia Petrova (RUS) 7–5, 7–5.

=== January 3, 2010 (Sunday) ===
==== Alpine skiing ====
- Women's World Cup in Zagreb, Croatia:
  - Slalom: (gold) Sandrine Aubert (FRA) (silver) Kathrin Zettel (AUT) (bronze) Susanne Riesch (GER)
    - Overall standings (after 14 of 33 races): (1) Maria Riesch (GER) 599 points (2) Lindsey Vonn (USA) 594 (3) Zettel 569
    - Slalom standings (after 5 of 8 races): (1) Aubert 316 points (2) Maria Riesch 293 (3) Šárka Záhrobská (CZE) 253

==== American football ====
- NFL Week 17 – end of regular season (division champions in **bold**, teams that earned a first-round bye in **bold italics**, teams that earned wild card berths in italics):
  - Buffalo Bills 30, **Indianapolis Colts** 7
    - The Colts lose their second straight game, but still end the season with a league-best 14–2 record.
  - Cleveland Browns 23, Jacksonville Jaguars 17
    - The Jags lose their fourth straight game and miss the playoffs.
  - **Minnesota Vikings** 44, New York Giants 7
    - The Vikings earn a first-round bye in the NFC playoffs.
  - Atlanta Falcons 20, Tampa Bay Buccaneers 10
  - Houston Texans 34, **New England Patriots** 27
    - The Texans, who rally from 14 points down in the fourth quarter, are eliminated from the playoffs on a tiebreaker because the Ravens and Jets both win.
  - Carolina Panthers 23, **New Orleans Saints** 10
    - The Saints end the season with three straight losses after a 13–0 start.
  - Chicago Bears 37, Detroit Lions 23
  - San Francisco 49ers 28, St. Louis Rams 6
    - The Rams suffer their eighth straight loss and end the season with a league-worst 1–15 record, that earn them the top selection at the draft. They would also become the 9th team to finish a season at 1–15.
  - Pittsburgh Steelers 30, Miami Dolphins 24
    - The Steelers are eliminated from the playoff on a tiebreaker despite their win, thus the 2003–2004 New England Patriots remain the last repeat Super Bowl champions, while the Dolphins, the host team for Super Bowl XLIV, are also eliminated from the postseason with their third straight loss.
  - Green Bay Packers 33, **Arizona Cardinals** 7
    - The teams will meet again in the Wild Card round at Arizona on January 10.
  - Baltimore Ravens 21, Oakland Raiders 13
    - The Ravens claim an AFC wild card berth with this win, and will meet the New England Patriots in the Wild Card round at Foxboro on January 10.
  - **Dallas Cowboys** 24, Philadelphia Eagles 0
    - The Cowboys clinch the NFC East title, and earn home field advantage in a rematch against the Eagles in the Wild Card round on January 9.
  - **San Diego Chargers** 23, Washington Redskins 20
    - The Chargers extend their winning streak to 11 games.
  - Tennessee Titans 17, Seattle Seahawks 13
    - Chris Johnson breaks Marshall Faulk's record for total yards from scrimmage and becomes the sixth player to rush for 2,000 yards in a season.
  - Kansas City Chiefs 44, Denver Broncos 24
    - Despite the Broncos' Kyle Orton becoming the sixth quarterback this season to pass for 400 yards in a game, they are eliminated from the playoffs with this loss.
  - Sunday Night Football: New York Jets 37, **Cincinnati Bengals** 0
    - A crushing win in the last regular-season game at Giants Stadium gives the Jets an AFC wild card berth and a rematch with the Bengals in Cincinnati on January 9.

==== Cricket ====
- England in South Africa:
  - 3rd Test in Cape Town, day 1:
    - South Africa 279/6 (83.2 ov, Jacques Kallis 108*)
      - Kallis scores his 33rd Test century and the seventh in 28 matches against England.
- Pakistan in Australia:
  - 2nd Test in Sydney, day 1:
    - Australia 127 (44.2 ov, Mohammad Asif 6/41); Pakistan 14/0. Pakistan trail by 113 runs with 10 wickets remaining in the first innings.
      - Asif claims a career-best six-wicket haul as Australia score their worst innings total at home in 13 years.

==== Cross-country skiing ====
- Tour de Ski:
  - Stage 3 in Oberhof, Germany:
    - Women's Sprint Classic: (gold) Petra Majdič (SLO) 4:18.8 (silver) Justyna Kowalczyk (POL) + 2.1 (bronze) Aino-Kaisa Saarinen (FIN) + 3.6
      - Standings (after 3 of 8 stages): (1) Kowalczyk 37:56.1 (2) Saarinen 38:00.4 (3) Kristin Størmer Steira (NOR) 38:26.2
    - Men's Sprint Classic: (gold) Eldar Rønning (NOR) 3:55.0 (silver) Petter Northug (NOR) + 2.1 (bronze) Axel Teichmann (GER) + 3.1
      - Standings (after 3 of 8 stages): (1) Northug 49:58.0 (2) Teichmann 50:07.8 (3) Emil Jönsson (SWE) 50.18.9

==== Darts ====
- PDC World Darts Championship in London, England:
  - Final: **Phil Taylor** (ENG) def. Simon Whitlock (AUS) 7–3
    - Taylor wins the title for the 13th time, in its 17th edition.

==== Football (soccer) ====
- (England) FA Cup third round:
  - In one of the biggest upsets in the Cup's history, Manchester United lose 0–1 at home to Leeds United of Football League One.

==== Ice hockey ====
- World Junior Championships in Saskatoon, Saskatchewan, Canada:
  - Semifinals:
    - **Canada** 6–1 Switzerland
      - Canada advance to the final for the ninth straight time, and extend their winning streak to 15 games.
    - Sweden 2–5 **United States**
      - USA reach the final for the third time in history and the first since 2004. Both previous finals were also against Canada.
  - Relegation round:
    - Czech Republic 10–2 Latvia
      - Standings (after 2 games): Czech Republic, Slovakia 6 points, Austria, Latvia 0.
      - Austria and Latvia will be relegated to Division I for the 2011 Championship, and will be replaced in the Top Division by Germany and Norway who won their respective Division I groups.

==== Luge ====
- World Cup in Königssee, Germany:
  - Men: (gold) Albert Demtschenko (RUS) 1:34.176 (silver) Armin Zöggeler (ITA) 1:34.549 (bronze) David Möller (GER) 1:34.640
    - Standings (after 5 of 8 races): (1) Zöggeler 455 points (2) Demtschenko 379 (3) Felix Loch (GER) 329
  - Teams: (gold) Germany (Felix Loch, Tatjana Hüfner, Tobias Wendl/Tobias Arlt) 2:38.302 (silver) Austria (Daniel Pfister, Nina Reithmayer, Andreas Linger/Wolfgang Linger) 2:38.951 (bronze) Canada (Samuel Edney, Alex Gough, Chris Moffat/Mike Moffat) 2:39.077
    - Standings (after 3 of 5 races): (1) Canada 240 points (2) Austria 225 (3) Germany 200

==== Nordic combined ====
- World Cup in Oberhof, Germany:
  - HS140 / 10 km: (gold) Johnny Spillane (USA) 28:13.3 (silver) Felix Gottwald (AUT) 28:44.1 (bronze) Björn Kircheisen (GER) 28:52.4
    - Standings (after 9 of 19 events): (1) Jason Lamy-Chappuis (FRA) 647 points (2) Tino Edelmann (GER) 462 (3) Gottwald 383

==== Ski jumping ====
- Four Hills Tournament:
  - World Cup in Innsbruck, Austria:
    - HS 130: (gold) Gregor Schlierenzauer (AUT) 251.1 points (130.0m/122.0m) (silver) Simon Ammann (SUI) 237.8 (128.5m/117.5m) (bronze) Janne Ahonen (FIN) 237.4 (128.0m/117.5m)
      - Four Hills Tournament standings (after 3 of 4 events): (1) Andreas Kofler (AUT) 772.2 points (2) Schlierenzauer 757.6 (3) Wolfgang Loitzl (AUT) 750.7
      - World Cup standings (after 9 of 23 events): (1) Schlierenzauer 611 points (2) Ammann 609 (3) Kofler 476

=== January 2, 2010 (Saturday) ===
==== American football ====
- NCAA bowl games:
  - International Bowl in Toronto, Canada:
    - South Florida 27, Northern Illinois 3
  - PapaJohns.com Bowl in Birmingham, Alabama:
    - UConn 20, South Carolina 7
  - AT&T Cotton Bowl Classic in Arlington, Texas:
    - Ole Miss 21, (19) Oklahoma State 7
  - AutoZone Liberty Bowl in Memphis, Tennessee:
    - Arkansas 20, East Carolina 17 (OT)
      - Alex Tejada's 37-yard field goal in overtime wins the game for the Razorbacks, after the Pirates' kicker Ben Hartman misses two FG attempts in the last minute of regulation time and another one in OT.
  - Valero Energy Alamo Bowl in San Antonio, Texas:
    - Texas Tech 41, Michigan State 31

==== Cross-country skiing ====
- Tour de Ski:
  - Stage 2 in Oberhof, Germany:
    - Women's 10 km Classic Handicap start: (gold) Justyna Kowalczyk (POL) 28:10.0 (silver) Aino-Kaisa Saarinen (FIN) + 2.8 (bronze) Kristin Størmer Steira (NOR) + 5.7
      - Standings (after 2 of 8 stages): (1) Kowalczyk 34:30.0 (2) Saarinen 34:32.8 (3) Størmer Steira 34:35.7
    - Men's 15 km Classic Handicap start: (gold) Petter Northug (NOR) 39:45.8 (silver) Maxim Vylegzhanin (RUS) + 0.1 (bronze) Matti Heikkinen (FIN) + 0.7
      - Standings (after 2 of 8 stages): (1) Northug 47:07.8 (2) Vylegzhanin 47:07.9 (3) Heikkinen 47:08.6

==== Ice hockey ====
- World Junior Championships in Saskatoon, Saskatchewan, Canada:
  - Quarterfinals:
    - Russia 2–3 (OT) **Switzerland**
      - Nino Niederreiter's goal with 32 seconds remaining in the third period sends the game to overtime, and his second goal with 14 seconds left in the extra period wins the game for the Swiss.
    - **United States** 6–2 Finland
  - Relegation round:
    - Slovakia 3–2 Austria
      - Standings: Slovakia 6 points (2 games), Czech Republic 3 (1), Latvia 0 (1), Austria 0 (2).

==== Luge ====
- World Cup in Königssee, Germany:
  - Women: (gold) Tatjana Hüfner (GER) 1:35.324 (silver) Natalie Geisenberger (GER) 1:35.550 (bronze) Steffi Sieger (GER) 1:35.867
    - Standings (after 5 of 8 races): (1) Hüfner 485 points (2) Geisenberger 440 (3) Anke Wischnewski (GER) 325
  - Doubles: (gold) Tobias Wendl/Tobias Arlt (GER) 1:34.496 (silver) André Florschütz/Torsten Wustlich (GER) 1:34.584 (bronze) Andreas Linger/Wolfgang Linger (AUT) 1:34.590
    - Standings (after 5 of 8 races): (1) Florschütz/Wustlich 410 points (2) Linger/Linger & Patric Leitner/Alexander Resch (GER) 360

==== Nordic combined ====
- World Cup in Oberhof, Germany:
  - HS140 / 10 km: (gold) Hannu Manninen (FIN) (silver) Felix Gottwald (AUT) (bronze) Jason Lamy Chappuis (FRA)
    - Standings (after 8 of 19 events): (1) Lamy-Chappuis 597 points (2) Tino Edelmann (GER) 440 (3) Gottwald 303

==== Tennis ====
- Capitala World Tennis Championship in Abu Dhabi, United Arab Emirates:
  - Final: **Rafael Nadal** (ESP) def. Robin Söderling (SWE) 7–6 (3), 7–5

=== January 1, 2010 (Friday) ===
==== American football ====
- NCAA bowl games:
  - BCS games:
    - Rose Bowl Game presented by citi in Pasadena, California:
      - (8) Ohio State 26, (7) Oregon 17
    - Allstate Sugar Bowl in New Orleans:
      - (5) Florida 51, (3) Cincinnati 24
        - 2007 Heisman Trophy winner Tim Tebow throws for 533 yards and 4 touchdowns in his final college game, as the Bearcats suffer their first loss this season.
  - Non-BCS games:
    - Outback Bowl in Tampa, Florida:
      - Auburn 38, Northwestern 35 (OT)
    - Konica Minolta Gator Bowl in Jacksonville, Florida:
      - Florida State 33, (16) West Virginia 21
        - Retiring Seminoles head coach Bobby Bowden exits with a win against the school he coached before coming to Tallahassee in 1976.
    - Capital One Bowl in Orlando, Florida:
      - (13) Penn State 19, (12) LSU 17
        - A 21-yard field goal by kicker Collin Wagner with 57 seconds left in the game gives the Nittany Lions their 11th win of the season, after the Tigers rally from 13-point deficit to take a 17–16 lead.

==== Cross-country skiing ====
- Tour de Ski:
  - Stage 1 in Oberhof, Germany:
    - Women's 2.5 km Freestyle: (gold) Petra Majdič (SLO) 6:35.3 (silver) Natalya Korostelyova (RUS) 6:37.4 (bronze) Justyna Kowalczyk (POL) 6:41.6
    - Men's 3.75 km Freestyle: (gold) Petter Northug (NOR) 7:37.4 (silver) Marcus Hellner (SWE) 7:38.2 (bronze) Axel Teichmann (GER) 7:39.4

==== Football (soccer) ====
- (Japan) Emperor's Cup Final in Tokyo:
  - **Gamba Osaka** 4–1 Nagoya Grampus
    - Gamba Osaka win the Cup for the second successive time and third overall.

==== Ski jumping ====
- Four Hills Tournament:
  - World Cup in Garmisch-Partenkirchen, Germany:
    - HS 140: (gold) Gregor Schlierenzauer (AUT) 277.7 points (136.5m/137.5m) (silver) Wolfgang Loitzl (AUT) 272.5 (135.0m/135.0m) (bronze) Simon Ammann (SUI) 272.4 (132.0m/143.5 hill record)
      - Four Hills Tournament standings (after 2 of 4 events): (1) Andreas Kofler (AUT) 537.1 points (2) Loitzl 517.9 (3) Janne Ahonen (FIN) 512.5
      - World Cup standings (after 8 of 23 events): (1) Ammann 529 points (2) Schlierenzauer 511 (3) Kofler 426
