= December 2009 in sports =

<<	December 2009					>>
Su	Mo	Tu	We	Th	Fr	Sa
		1	2	3	4	5
6	7	8	9	10	11	12
13	14	15	16	17	18	19
20	21	22	23	24	25	26
27	28	29	30	31
Science; Sports

This list shows notable sports-related deaths, events, and notable outcomes that occurred in December of 2009.

== Deaths in December ==
- 28: James Owen Sullivan
- 24: George Michael
- 17: Chris Henry

== Current sporting seasons ==
=== American football 2009 ===
- NFL
- NCAA Division I FBS

=== Auto racing 2009 ===
- Sprint Cup begins Feb 14
  - Chase
- IRL IndyCar Series begins Mar 14
- World Rally Championship begins Feb 14
- Formula Two begins Apr 17
- Nationwide Series begins Feb 13
- Camping World Truck Series begins Feb 12
- GP2 Series begins May 8
- GP3 Series
- WTTC begins Mar 7
- V8 Supercar begins Feb 18
- American Le Mans begins Mar 20
- Le Mans Series
- A1 Grand Prix begin Feb 28-->
- GP2 Asia Series
- Superleague Formula begin Apr 4
- Rolex Sports Car Series begins Jan 30
- FIA GT1 World Championship begins Apr 3
- FIA GT2 European Championship begins Apr 3
- Formula Three
- World Series by Renault begins Apr 17
- Deutsche Tourenwagen Masters
- Super GT-->
- Major League Baseball -->
- Nippon Professional Baseball-->

=== Basketball 2009 ===
- NBA
- NCAA Division I men
- NCAA Division I women
- Euroleague
- Eurocup
- EuroChallenge
- ASEAN Basketball League
- Australia
- France
- Germany
- Greece
- Iran
- Israel
- Italy
- Philippines
  - Philippine Cup
- Russia
- Spain
- Turkey

=== Cricket 2009–2010 ===
- Australia:
  - Sheffield Shield
  - Ford Ranger Cup
- Bangladesh:
  - National League
- India:
  - Ranji Trophy
- New Zealand:
  - Plunket Shield
- Pakistan:
  - Quaid-i-Azam Trophy
- South Africa:
  - SuperSport Series
- Sri Lanka:
  - Premier Trophy
- Zimbabwe:
  - Logan Cup

=== Football (soccer) 2009 ===
National teams competitions

- 2011 FIFA Women's World Cup qualification (UEFA)
- 2011 AFC Asian Cup qualification

International clubs competitions

- UEFA (Europe) Champions League
- Europa League
- UEFA Women's Champions League
- CONCACAF (North & Central America) Champions League
- OFC (Oceania) Champions League

Domestic (national) competitions

- Australia
- England
- France
- Germany
- Iran
- Italy
- Scotland
- Spain

=== Golf 2010 ===
- European Tour

=== Ice hockey 2009 ===
- National Hockey League

=== Rugby union 2009 ===
- Heineken Cup
- European Challenge Cup
- English Premiership
- Celtic League
- LV Cup
- Top 14

=== Winter sports ===
- Alpine Skiing World Cup
- Biathlon World Cup
- Bobsleigh World Cup
- Cross-Country Skiing World Cup
- Freestyle Skiing World Cup
- Luge World Cup
- Nordic Combined World Cup
- Skeleton World Cup
- Ski Jumping World Cup
- Snowboarding World Cup
- Speed Skating World Cup

== Days of the month ==
=== December 31, 2009 (Thursday) ===
==== American football ====
- NCAA bowl games:
  - Bell Helicopters Armed Forces Bowl in Fort Worth:
    - Air Force 47, Houston 20
  - Brut Sun Bowl in El Paso:
    - Oklahoma 31, (21) Stanford 27
  - Texas Bowl in Houston:
    - Navy 35, Missouri 13
  - Insight Bowl in Tempe:
    - Iowa State 14, Minnesota 13
  - Chick-fil-A Bowl in Atlanta:
    - (11) Virginia Tech 37, Tennessee 14

==== Ice hockey ====
- World Junior Championships in Saskatchewan, Canada: (teams in **bold** advance to the semifinals, teams in italics secure quarterfinals berths, teams in ~~strike~~ go to relegation round)
  - Group A in Saskatoon:
    - Switzerland 4–1 ~~Slovakia~~
    - United States 4–5 (SO) **Canada**
      - Canada rally from 2 goals down with 10 minutes remaining to tie the score in regulation time and then win the shootout 3–2.
      - Final standings: Canada 11 points, USA 10, Switzerland 6, Slovakia 3, ~~Latvia~~ 0.
  - Group B in Regina:
    - **Sweden** 7–1 Finland
    - Russia 5–2 ~~Czech Republic~~
      - Final standings: Sweden 12 points, Russia 9, Finland 6, Czech Republic 3, ~~Austria~~ 0.
- Spengler Cup Final in Davos, Switzerland:
  - HC Dinamo Minsk (Belarus) 3–1 (Switzerland) HC Davos

=== December 30, 2009 (Wednesday) ===
==== American football ====
- NCAA bowl games:
  - Roady's Humanitarian Bowl in Boise:
    - Idaho 43, Bowling Green 42
  - Pacific Life Holiday Bowl in San Diego:
    - (22) Nebraska 33, (20) Arizona 0

==== Cricket ====
- England in South Africa:
  - 2nd Test in Durban, day 5:
    - South Africa 343 and 133; England 574/9d. **England win by an innings and 98 runs, lead the 4-match series 1–0.**
- Pakistan in Australia:
  - 1st Test in Melbourne, day 5:
    - Australia 454/5d and 225/8d; Pakistan 258 and 251. **Australia win by 170 runs, lead the 3-match series 1–0.**

==== Ice hockey ====
- World Junior Championships in Saskatchewan, Canada: (teams in italics secure quarterfinals berths, teams in ~~strike~~ go to relegation round)
  - Group A in Saskatoon:
    - Switzerland 7–5 ~~Latvia~~
      - Standings: Canada, USA 9 points (3 games), Slovakia, Switzerland 3 (3), Latvia 0 (4).
  - Group B in Regina:
    - Finland 10–1 ~~Austria~~
      - Standings: Sweden 9 points (3 games), Russia, Finland 6 (3), Czech Republic 3 (3), Austria 0 (4).

=== December 29, 2009 (Tuesday) ===
==== Alpine skiing ====
- Men's World Cup in Bormio, Italy:
  - Downhill: (gold) Andrej Jerman (SLO) (silver) Didier Defago (SUI) (bronze) Michael Walchhofer (AUT)
    - Overall standings (after 15 of 34 races): (1) Carlo Janka (SUI) 575 points (2) Benjamin Raich (AUT) 565 (3) Didier Cuche (SUI) 476
    - Downhill standings (after 4 of 8 races): (1) Cuche 251 points (2) Walchhofer 200 (3) Janka 184
- Women's World Cup in Lienz, Austria:
  - Slalom: (gold) Marlies Schild (AUT) (silver) Sandrine Aubert (FRA) (bronze) Kathrin Zettel (AUT)
    - Overall standings (after 13 of 33 races): (1) Lindsey Vonn (USA) 594 points (2) Maria Riesch (GER) 549 (3) Zettel 489
    - Slalom standings (after 4 of 8 races): (1) Riesch 243 points (2) Schild 220 (3) Aubert 216

==== American football ====
- NCAA bowl games:
  - EagleBank Bowl in Washington
    - UCLA 30, Temple 21
  - Champs Sports Bowl in Orlando
    - (25) Wisconsin 20, (15) Miami (FL) 14

==== Cricket ====
- England in South Africa:
  - 2nd Test in Durban, day 4:
    - South Africa 343 & 76/6 (32.0 ov); England 575/9d (Ian Bell 141). South Africa trail by 156 runs with 4 wickets remaining.
- Pakistan in Australia:
  - 1st Test in Melbourne, day 4:
    - Australia 454/5d and 225/8d (Shane Watson 120*, Mohammad Aamer 5/79); Pakistan 258 and 170/3. Pakistan require another 252 runs with 7 wickets remaining.
      - Watson scores his maiden Test century and Australia's first hundred this summer, while Aamer becomes the youngest fast bowler in history to claim five-wickets in an innings.

==== Ice hockey ====
- World Junior Championships in Saskatchewan, Canada: (teams in italics secure quarterfinals berths)
  - Group A in Saskatoon:
    - Latvia 1–12 United States
    - Canada 8–2 Slovakia
      - Standings: Canada, USA 9 points (3 games), Slovakia 3 (3), Switzerland 0 (2), Latvia 0 (3).
  - Group B in Regina:
    - Austria 1–7 Czech Republic
    - Sweden 4–1 Russia
      - Standings: Sweden 9 points (3 games), Russia 6 (3), Finland 3 (2), Czech Republic 3 (3), Austria 0 (3).

==== Ski jumping ====
- Four Hills Tournament:
  - World Cup in Oberstdorf, Germany:
    - HS 137: (gold) Andreas Kofler (AUT) 265.2 points (125.0 m/134.0 m) (silver) Janne Ahonen (FIN) 253.3 (116.5 m/137.0 m) (bronze) Thomas Morgenstern (AUT) 250.3 (124.5 m/126.5 m)
      - World Cup standings (after 7 of 23 events): (1) Simon Ammann (SUI) 469 points (2) Gregor Schlierenzauer (AUT) 411 (3) Kofler 379

=== December 28, 2009 (Monday) ===
==== Alpine skiing ====
- Women's World Cup in Lienz, Austria:
  - Giant slalom: (gold) Kathrin Hölzl (GER) 2:16.61 (silver) Manuela Mölgg (ITA) 2:16.66 (bronze) Taïna Barioz (FRA) 2:16.72
    - Overall standings (after 12 of 33 races): (1) Lindsey Vonn (USA) 581 points (2) Maria Riesch (GER) 531 (3) Kathrin Zettel (AUT) 429
    - Giant slalom standings (after 4 of 7 races): (1) Hölzl 281 points (2) Zettel 265 (3) Tina Maze (SLO) 202

==== American football ====
- NFL Monday Night Football, Week 16 (division champion in **bold**):
  - Chicago Bears 36, **Minnesota Vikings** 30 (OT)
    - The Vikings' loss gives the New Orleans Saints home advantage throughout the NFC playoffs.
- NCAA bowl games:
  - Advocare V100 Independence Bowl in Shreveport:
    - Georgia 44, Texas A&M 20

==== Cricket ====
- England in South Africa:
  - 2nd Test in Durban, day 3:
    - South Africa 343; England 386/5 (123.0 ov, Alastair Cook 118). England led by 43 runs with 5 wickets remaining in the 1st innings.
- Pakistan in Australia:
  - 1st Test in Melbourne, day 3:
    - Australia 454/5d & 111/3 (34.0 ov); Pakistan 258. Australia led by 307 runs with 7 wickets remaining.

==== Ice hockey ====
- World Junior Championships in Saskatchewan, Canada:
  - Group A in Saskatoon:
    - Canada 6–0 Switzerland
      - Standings (after 2 games): Canada, USA 6 points, Slovakia 3, Switzerland, Latvia 0.
  - Group B in Regina:
    - Finland 0–2 Russia
      - Standings (after 2 games): Sweden, Russia 6 points, Finland 3, Austria, Czech Republic 0.

=== December 27, 2009 (Sunday) ===
==== American football ====
- NFL Week 16 (division champions in **bold**, teams assured of playoff berths in italics):
  - Atlanta Falcons 31, Buffalo Bills 3
  - **Cincinnati Bengals** 17, Kansas City Chiefs 10
    - Five days after the Bengals attended the funeral of their teammate Chris Henry, they clinch the AFC North.
  - Cleveland Browns 23, Oakland Raiders 9
    - The Raiders' Sebastian Janikowski makes a 61-yard field goal at the end of the first half, becoming the fourth kicker in NFL history to connect from 60-plus yards.
  - Green Bay Packers 48, Seattle Seahawks 10
  - Houston Texans 27, Miami Dolphins 20
  - **New England Patriots** 35, Jacksonville Jaguars 7
    - The Pats clinch the AFC East title.
  - Tampa Bay Buccaneers 20, **New Orleans Saints** 17 (OT)
  - Carolina Panthers 41, New York Giants 9
    - The Panthers rout the Giants in their last game at Giants Stadium. The Jets will close out Giants Stadium next week when they host the Bengals.
  - Pittsburgh Steelers 23, Baltimore Ravens 20
  - San Francisco 49ers 20, Detroit Lions 6
  - **Arizona Cardinals** 31, St. Louis Rams 10
  - New York Jets 29, **Indianapolis Colts** 15
    - The Colts' record regular-season winning streak ends after 23 games. Peyton Manning becomes the fourth quarterback in NFL history with 50,000 career passing yards.
  - Philadelphia Eagles 30, Denver Broncos 27
  - Sunday Night Football: Dallas Cowboys 17, Washington Redskins 0
    - The Cowboys' win gives them the last playoff berth in the NFC and sets up a home showdown with the Eagles for the NFC East title next week.
- NCAA bowl games:
  - Gaylord Hotels Music City Bowl in Nashville
    - Clemson 21, Kentucky 13

==== Cricket ====
- England in South Africa:
  - 2nd Test in Durban, day 2:
    - South Africa 343; England 103/1 (26.2 ov). England trail by 240 runs with 9 wickets remaining in the 1st innings.
- Pakistan in Australia:
  - 1st Test in Melbourne, day 2:
    - Australia 454/5d; Pakistan 109/4. Pakistan trail by 345 runs with 6 wickets remaining in the 1st innings.
- Sri Lanka in India:
  - 5th ODI in New Delhi:
    - Sri Lanka 83/5 (23.3 ov). **No result. India win the 5-match series 3–1**.

==== Ice hockey ====
- World Junior Championships in Saskatchewan, Canada:
  - Group A in Saskatoon:
    - United States 3–0 Switzerland
    - Slovakia 8–3 Latvia
      - Standings: USA 6 points (2 matches), Canada 3 (1), Slovakia 3 (2), Switzerland 0 (1), Latvia 0 (2).
  - Group B in Regina:
    - Austria 3–7 Sweden
    - Czech Republic 3–4 Finland
      - The Finns rally from 3-goal deficit with less than 3 minutes left in the second period.
      - Standings: Sweden 6 points (2 games), Russia, Finland 3 (1), Austria, Czech Republic 0 (2).

=== December 26, 2009 (Saturday) ===
==== American football ====
- NCAA bowl games:
  - Little Caesars Pizza Bowl in Detroit:
    - Marshall 21, Ohio 17
  - Meineke Car Care Bowl in Charlotte:
    - (17) Pittsburgh 19, UNC 17
  - Emerald Bowl in San Francisco:
    - (24) USC 24, Boston College 13

==== Cricket ====
- England in South Africa:
  - 2nd Test in Durban, day 1:
    - South Africa 175/5 (61.0 ov)
- Pakistan in Australia:
  - 1st Test in Melbourne, day 1:
    - Australia 305/3 (90.0 ov)
      - The string of century near-misses continue with Shane Watson dismissed at 93 and Simon Katich at 98, following his 99 in the previous match.

==== Ice hockey ====
- World Junior Championships in Saskatchewan, Canada:
  - Group A in Saskatoon:
    - Latvia 0–16 Canada
    - Slovakia 3–7 United States
  - Group B in Regina:
    - Czech Republic 1–10 Sweden
    - Russia 6–2 Austria

=== December 25, 2009 (Friday) ===
==== American football ====
- NFL Week 16: (team in **bold** clinches division title)
  - **San Diego Chargers** 42, Tennessee Titans 17
    - The Chargers win their tenth straight game and secure a first-round bye in the AFC playoffs.

==== Basketball ====
- NBA Christmas Day games:
  - Miami Heat 93, New York Knicks 87
  - Boston Celtics 86, Orlando Magic 77
  - Cleveland Cavaliers 102, Los Angeles Lakers 87
  - Phoenix Suns 124, Los Angeles Clippers 93
  - Portland Trail Blazers 107, Denver Nuggets 96

=== December 24, 2009 (Thursday) ===
==== American football ====
- NCAA bowl games:
  - Sheraton Hawaʻi Bowl in Honolulu:
    - SMU 45, Nevada 10
      - The Mustangs easily win their first bowl appearance since the program was shut down by the NCAA in 1987 due to massive violations of NCAA rules.

==== Cricket ====
- Sri Lanka in India:
  - 4th ODI in Kolkata:
    - Sri Lanka 315/6 (50 overs, Upul Tharanga 118); India 317/3 (48.1 overs, Gautam Gambhir 150*, Virat Kohli 107). **India win by 7 wickets, lead the 5-match series 3–1**.

=== December 23, 2009 (Wednesday) ===
==== American football ====
- NCAA bowl games:
  - SDCCU Poinsettia Bowl in San Diego:
    - (23) Utah 37, Cal 27
      - The Utes win their ninth straight bowl appearance, tying USC for second on the all-time list behind Florida State's 11.

==== Auto racing ====
- Formula One news:
  - Seven-time champion Michael Schumacher announces he will come back from retirement and drive for Mercedes Grand Prix team in 2010 season. BBC

=== December 22, 2009 (Tuesday) ===
==== American football ====
- NCAA bowl games:
  - Maaco Bowl Las Vegas in Las Vegas:
    - (14) BYU 44, (18) Oregon State 20

==== Freestyle skiing ====
- World Cup in Innichen/San Candido, Italy:
  - Men's skicross: (gold) Michael Schmid (SUI) (silver) Audun Groenvold (NOR) (bronze) Conradign Netzer (SUI)
    - Standings after 2 of 12 events: (1) Schmid 200 points (2) Groenvold 130 (3) Xavier Kuhn (FRA) 125
  - Women's skicross: (gold) Anna Holmlund (SWE) (silver) Ophelie David (FRA) (bronze) Sanna Lüdi (SUI)
    - Standings after 2 of 12 events: (1) Holmund 200 points (2) David 140 (3) Ashleigh McIvor (CAN) 125

=== December 21, 2009 (Monday) ===
==== Alpine skiing ====
- Men's World Cup in Alta Badia, Italy:
  - Slalom: (gold) Reinfried Herbst (AUT) 1:49.31 (silver) Silvan Zurbriggen (SUI) 1:49.39 (bronze) Manfred Pranger (AUT) 1:49.48
    - Overall standings after 14 of 34 races: (1) Benjamin Raich (AUT) 565 points (2) Carlo Janka (SUI) 553 (3) Aksel Lund Svindal (NOR) 443
    - Slalom standings after 2 of 9 races: (1) Herbst 200 points (2) Zurbriggen 102 (3) Pranger 89

==== American football ====
- NFL Monday Night Football, Week 15:
  - New York Giants 45, Washington Redskins 12

==== Basketball ====
- College basketball news:
  - Kentucky defeats Drexel 88–44, making the Wildcats the first NCAA Division I men's team with 2,000 all-time wins. (AP via ESPN)
- NBA:
  - The Sacramento Kings make the biggest comeback in 13 years as they rally from a 35-points deficit with 8:50 remaining in the third quarter to beat the Chicago Bulls 102–98.

==== Cricket ====
- Sri Lanka in India:
  - 3rd ODI in Cuttack:
    - Sri Lanka 239 (44.2 overs); India 242/3 (42.4 overs). **India win by 7 wickets, lead the 5-match series 2–1**.

==== Freestyle skiing ====
- World Cup in Innichen/San Candido, Italy:
  - Men's skicross: (gold) Michael Schmid (SUI) (silver) Xavier Kuhn (FRA) (bronze) Casey Puckett (USA)
  - Women's skicross: (gold) Anna Holmlund (SWE) (silver) Ashleigh McIvor (CAN) (bronze) Ophélie David (FRA)

==== Ice hockey ====
- New Jersey Devils goaltender Martin Brodeur sets a new NHL record for career shutouts with 104 as the Devils defeat the Pittsburgh Penguins 4–0 in Pittsburgh. (AP via ESPN)

=== December 20, 2009 (Sunday) ===
==== Alpine skiing ====
- Men's World Cup in Alta Badia, Italy:
  - Giant slalom: (gold) Massimiliano Blardone (ITA) 2:35.76 (silver) Davide Simoncelli (ITA) 2:36.19 (bronze) Cyprien Richard (FRA) 2:37.39
    - Overall standings (after 13 of 34 races): (1) Benjamin Raich (AUT) 565 points (2) Carlo Janka (SUI) 553 (3) Didier Cuche (SUI) 436
    - Giant slalom standings (after 4 of 7 races): (1) Raich 235 points (2) Blardone 230 (3) Ted Ligety (USA) 192
- Women's World Cup in Val-d'Isère, France:
  - Super-G: (gold) Fränzi Aufdenblatten (SUI) 1:26.43 (silver) Nadia Styger (SUI) 1:26.66 (bronze) Lindsey Vonn (USA) 1:26.69
    - Overall standings (after 11 of 32 races): (1) Vonn 581 points (2) Maria Riesch (GER) 531 (3) Kathrin Zettel (AUT) 384
    - Super-G standings (after 2 of 7 races): (1) Vonn 140 points (2) Elisabeth Görgl (AUT) 124 (3) Styger 116

==== American football ====
- NFL Week 15 (division champions in **bold**, teams assured of playoff berths in italics):
  - New England Patriots 17, Buffalo Bills 10
  - Houston Texans 16, St. Louis Rams 13
  - Atlanta Falcons 10, New York Jets 7
  - **Arizona Cardinals** 31, Detroit Lions 24
  - Tennessee Titans 27, Miami Dolphins 24 (OT)
  - Cleveland Browns 41, Kansas City Chiefs 34
  - Tampa Bay Buccaneers 24, Seattle Seahawks 7
  - Baltimore Ravens 31, Chicago Bears 7
  - Oakland Raiders 20, Denver Broncos 19
  - **San Diego Chargers** 27, Cincinnati Bengals 24
    - The Chargers win their ninth straight game.
  - Philadelphia Eagles 27, San Francisco 49ers 13
  - Pittsburgh Steelers 37, Green Bay Packers 36
    - Ben Roethlisberger connects with Mike Wallace for the tying touchdown on the game's final play, with Jeff Reed's extra point winning the game. The winning play also makes Roethlisberger the 10th quarterback in history to throw for 500 yards in a game.
  - Sunday Night Football: Carolina Panthers 26, **Minnesota Vikings** 7
- NCAA bowl games:
  - New Orleans Bowl in New Orleans: Middle Tennessee 42, Southern Miss 32

==== Biathlon ====
- World Cup 3 in Pokljuka, Slovenia:
  - 10 km pursuit women: (gold) Svetlana Sleptsova (RUS) 34:03.2 (2 penalty loops) (silver) Magdalena Neuner (GER) 34:39.5 (3) (bronze) Anna Bogaliy-Titovets (RUS) 34:46.4 (2)
    - Overall standings after 7 of 25 events: (1) Helena Jonsson (SWE) 342 points (2) Anna Carin Olofsson-Zidek (SWE) 298 (3) Sleptsova 272
    - Pursuit standings after 2 of 6 events: (1) Sleptsova 114 points (2) Jonsson 96 (3) Andrea Henkel (GER) 69
  - 12.5 km pursuit men: (gold) Evgeny Ustyugov (RUS) 34:50.9 (2 penalty loops) (silver) Roland Lessing (EST) 35:00.2 (0) (bronze) Simon Eder (AUT) 35:01.8 (2)
    - Overall standings after 7 of 25 events: (1) Tim Burke (USA) 253 points (2) Simon Fourcade (FRA) 246 (3) Christoph Sumann (AUT) 225
    - Pursuit standings after 2 of 6 events: (1) Eder 102 points (2) Ustyugov 100 (3) Burke 69

==== Bobsleigh ====
- World Cup in Altenberg, Germany:
  - Four-man: (gold) André Lange, René Hoppe, Kevin Kuske, Martin Putze (GER) 1:47.23 (silver) Steven Holcomb, Justin Olsen, Steve Mesler, Curtis Tomasevicz (USA) 1:47.99 (bronze) Yevgeni Popov, Denis Moiseychenkov, Andrey Yurkov, Alexey Kireev (RUS) 1:48.23
    - Standings (after 5 of 8 races): (1) Holcomb 1053 points (2) Jānis Miņins (LAT) 938 (3) Lyndon Rush (CAN) 913

==== Cricket ====
- England in South Africa:
  - 1st Test in Centurion, day 5:
    - South Africa 418 and 301/7d; England 356 and 228/9. **Match drawn. 4-match series level 0–0.**
- West Indies in Australia:
  - 3rd Test in Perth, day 5:
    - Australia 520/7d and 150; West Indies 312 and 323. **Australia win by 35 runs, win the 3-match series 2–0**.

==== Cross-country skiing ====
- World Cup in Rogla, Slovenia:
  - Women's 15 km classic mass start: (gold) Justyna Kowalczyk (POL) (silver) Marit Bjørgen (NOR) (bronze) Anna Haag (SWE)
    - Overall standings (after 8 of 20 events): (1) Bjørgen 447 points (2) Kowalczyk 397 (3) Petra Majdič (SLO) 383
    - Distance standings (after 4 events): (1) Bjørgen 235 points (2) Irina Khazova (RUS) 221 (3) Charlotte Kalla (SWE) 218
  - Men's 30 km classic mass start: (gold) Petter Northug (NOR) (silver) Alexander Legkov (RUS) (bronze) Maxim Vylegzhanin (RUS)
    - Overall standings (after 8 of 20 events): (1) Northug 440 points (2) John Kristian Dahl (NOR) 200 (3) Legkov 187
    - Distance standings (after 4 events): (1) Northug 260 points (2) Legkov 187 (3) Matti Heikkinen (FIN) 160

==== Football (soccer) ====
- (Colombia) Colombian Primera A Clausura Final, second leg: (first leg score in parentheses)
  - Independiente Medellín 2–2 (1–0) Atlético Huila. Independiente Medellín win 3–2 on aggregate.
    - Independiente win the championship for the fifth time.

==== Freestyle skiing ====
- World Cup in Changchun, China:
  - Men's aerials: (gold) Jia Zongyang (CHN) (silver) Qi Guangpu (CHN) (bronze) Anton Kushnir (BLR)
    - Standings after 2 of 6 events: (1) Kushnir 160 points (2) Jia 136 (3) Liu Zhongqing (CHN) 100
  - Women's aerials: (gold) Xu Mengtao (CHN) (silver) Guo Xinxin (CHN) (bronze) Zhang Zin (CHN)
    - Standings after 2 of 6 events: (1) Guo 180 points (2) Xu 160 (3) Li Nina (CHN) 100

==== Golf ====
- European Tour:
  - South African Open in Paarl, South Africa:
    - Winner: Richie Ramsay (SCO) 275 (−13)^{PO}
      - Ramsay wins his first European Tour title.

==== Handball ====
- World Women's Championship in Nanjing, China:
  - 3rd place: (bronze) Norway 31–26 Spain
  - Final: (silver) France 22–25 (gold) **Russia**
    - Russia win the title for the third straight time and fourth in last five championships.

==== Nordic combined ====
- World Cup in Ramsau, Austria:
  - HS98 / 10 km: (gold) Björn Kircheisen (GER) 23:29.7 (silver) Magnus Moan (NOR) 23:30.1 (bronze) Felix Gottwald (AUT) 23:30.4
    - Overall standings (after 7 of 19 events): (1) Jason Lamy-Chappuis (FRA) 537 points (2) Tino Edelmann (GER) 424 (3) Petter Tande (NOR) 271

==== Rugby union ====
- Heineken Cup pool stage, matchday 4:
  - Pool 1: Perpignan (France) 14–37 (Ireland) Munster
    - Standings: Munster 15 points, Northampton 13, Perpignan 6, Treviso 5.
  - Pool 2: Gloucester (England) 19–6 (Scotland) Glasgow Warriors
    - Standings: Biarritz 18 points, Gloucester 8, Newport, Worcester 5.
  - Pool 4: Stade Français (France) 29–16 (Ireland) Ulster
    - This match was originally intended to be held in Brussels the previous day, but heavy snowfall forced its move to Paris.
    - Standings: Stade Français 13 points, Ulster, Edinburgh 9, Bath 6.
  - Pool 5: Sale Sharks (England) 21–17 (England) ~~Harlequins~~
    - Standings: Toulouse 14 points, Sale 13, Cardiff 9, Harlequins 2.
- Amlin Challenge Cup pool stage, matchday 4:
  - Pool 1: Leeds Carnegie (England) 47–0 (Romania) ~~București Oaks~~
    - Standings: Leeds, Bourgoin 14 points, București 6, ~~Parma~~ 4.
  - Pool 3: ~~Rovigo~~ (Italy) 7–30 (France) Toulon
    - Standings: Toulon 18 points, Saracens 13, ~~Castres~~ 6, Rovigo 0.
  - Pool 5: Albi (France) 38–16 (Italy) ~~Petrarca Padova~~
    - Standings: Newcastle 15 points, Montauban 12, Albi 10, Padova 1 (3).

==== Ski jumping ====
- World Cup in Engelberg, Switzerland:
  - HS 137: (gold) Simon Ammann (SUI) 144.8 points (141.0 m equal hill record) (silver) Bjørn Einar Romøren (NOR) 140.4 (138.0 m) (bronze) Daiki Ito (JPN) 132.6 (134.5 m)
    - The final round is cancelled due to poor weather conditions.
    - Overall standings (after 6 of 23 events): (1) Ammann 424 points (2) Gregor Schlierenzauer (AUT) 382 (3) Romøren 279

==== Snowboarding ====
- World Cup in Telluride, United States:
  - Men's team snowboard cross: (gold) Xavier De La Rue/Pierre Vaultier (FRA) (silver) Nate Holland/Nick Baumgartner (USA) (bronze) Mike Robertson/Drew Neilson (CAN)
  - Women's team snowboard cross: (gold) Lindsey Jacobellis/Faye Gulini (USA) (silver) Maëlle Ricker/Dominique Maltais (CAN) (bronze) Simona Mieler/Tanja Frieden (SUI)

=== December 19, 2009 (Saturday) ===
==== Alpine skiing ====
- Men's World Cup in Val Gardena, Italy:
  - Downhill: (gold) Manuel Osborne-Paradis (CAN) 2:01.27 (silver) Mario Scheiber (AUT) 2:01.40 (bronze) Johan Clarey (FRA) & Ambrosi Hoffmann (SUI) 2:01.52
    - Overall standings (after 12 of 34 races): (1) Carlo Janka (SUI) 540 points (2) Benjamin Raich (AUT) 515 (3) Didier Cuche (SUI) 410
    - Downhill standings (after 3 of 8 races): (1) Cuche 206 points (2) Janka 160 (3) Michael Walchhofer (AUT) 140
- Women's World Cup in Val-d'Isère, France:
  - Downhill: Cancelled

==== American football ====
- NFL Week 15 (division champion in **bold**):
  - Dallas Cowboys 24, **New Orleans Saints** 17
    - The Saints' bid for a perfect season ends.
- NCAA bowl games:
  - New Mexico Bowl in Albuquerque, New Mexico: Wyoming 35, Fresno State 28 (2 OT)
  - St. Petersburg Bowl in St. Petersburg, Florida: Rutgers 45, UCF 24
- Amos Alonzo Stagg Bowl (Division III championship) in Salem, Virginia:
  - Wisconsin-Whitewater 35, Mount Union 28
    - The Warhawks win their second national title in three years, making them 2–3 in the two teams' five consecutive Stagg Bowl matchups.

==== Biathlon ====
- World Cup 3 in Pokljuka, Slovenia:
  - 7.5 km sprint women: (gold) Svetlana Sleptsova (RUS) 24:57.0 (0 penalties) (silver) Anna Bogaliy-Titovets (RUS) 25:40.4 (1) (bronze) Magdalena Neuner (GER) 25:59.6 (2)
    - Overall standings after 6 of 25 events: (1) Helena Jonsson (SWE) 306 points (2) Anna Carin Olofsson-Zidek (SWE) 264 (3) Sleptsova 212
    - Sprint standings after 3 of 10 events: (1) Jonsson 126 points (2) Olofsson-Zidek 122 (3) Olga Medvedtseva (RUS) 116
  - 10 km sprint men: (gold) Ivan Tcherezov (RUS) 28:10.0 (0 penalties) (silver) Dominik Landertinger (AUT) 28:21.1 (1) (bronze) Thomas Frei (SUI) 28:52.4 (1)
    - Overall standings after 6 of 25 events: (1) Christoph Sumann (AUT) 225 points (2) Tim Burke (USA) 215 (3) Simon Fourcade (FRA) 214
    - Sprint standings after 3 of 10 events: (1) Ole Einar Bjørndalen (NOR) 120 points (2) Burke 103 (3) Fourcade 101

==== Bobsleigh ====
- World Cup in Altenberg, Germany:
  - Two-man: (gold) André Lange/Kevin Kuske (GER) 1:49.81 (silver) Thomas Florschütz/Marc Kühne (GER) 1:50.47 (bronze) Ivo Rüegg/Cedric Grand (SUI) 1:50.71
    - Standings (after 5 of 8 races): (1) Rüegg 1010 points (2) Karl Angerer (GER) 914 (3) Florschütz 890
  - Two-woman: (gold) Kaillie Humphries/Heather Moyse (CAN) 1:53.60 (silver) Helen Upperton/Jennifer Ciochetti (CAN) 1:54.03 (bronze) Shauna Rohbock/Michelle Rzepka (USA) 1:54.11
    - Standings (after 5 of 8 races): (1) Sandra Kiriasis (GER) 1022 (2) Humphries 961 (3) Rohbock 953

==== Cricket ====
- England in South Africa:
  - 1st Test in Centurion, day 4:
    - South Africa 418 & 301/7d (Hashim Amla 100); England 356 & 11/1 (6.0 ov). England require another 353 runs with 9 wickets remaining.
- West Indies in Australia:
  - 3rd Test in Perth, day 4:
    - Australia 520/7d & 150; West Indies 312 & 308/9 (91.0 ov). West Indies require another 51 runs with 1 wicket remaining.

==== Cross-country skiing ====
- World Cup in Rogla, Slovenia:
  - Women's sprint classic: (gold) Marit Bjørgen (NOR) (silver) Justyna Kowalczyk (POL) (bronze) Petra Majdič (SLO)
    - Overall standings (after 7 of 20 events): (1) Bjørgen 362 points (2) Majdič 332 (3) Aino-Kaisa Saarinen (FIN) 308
    - Sprint standings (after 4 events): (1) Majdič 260 points (2) Bjørgen 212 (3) Kowalczyk 185
  - Men's sprint classic: (gold) Petter Northug (NOR) (silver) Tobias Angerer (GER) (bronze) Jesper Modin (SWE)
    - Overall standings (after 7 of 20 events): (1) Northug 340 points (2) John Kristian Dahl (NOR) 200 (3) Ola Vigen Hattestad (NOR) 170
    - Sprint standings (after 4 events): (1) Dahl 200 points (2) Northug 180 (3) Hattestad 170

==== Football (soccer) ====
- FIFA Club World Cup in Abu Dhabi, United Arab Emirates:
  - Bronze medal match: (bronze) **Pohang Steelers** (South Korea) 1–1 (4–3 pen.) (Mexico) Atlante
  - Final: (silver) Estudiantes (Argentina) 1–2 (ET) (gold) (Spain) **Barcelona**
    - Barcelona win the title for the first time and their sixth trophy of the year.

==== Freestyle skiing ====
- World Cup in Changchun, China:
  - Men's aerials: (gold) Anton Kushnir (BLR) (silver) Liu Zhongqing (CHN) (bronze) Wu Chao (CHN)
  - Women's aerials: (gold) Guo Xinxin (CHN) (silver) Li Nina (CHN) (bronze) Xu Mengtao (CHN)

==== Nordic combined ====
- World Cup in Ramsau, Austria:
  - HS98 / 10 km: (gold) Jason Lamy Chappuis (FRA) 25:45.6 (silver) Tino Edelmann (GER) 25:47.7 (bronze) Alessandro Pittin (ITA) 25:49.3
    - Overall standings (after 6 of 19 events): (1) Lamy-Chappuis 505 points (2) Edelmann 384 (3) Eric Frenzel (GER) 240

==== Rugby union ====
- Heineken Cup pool stage, matchday 4: (teams in ~~strike~~ are eliminated)
  - Pool 1: Benetton Treviso (Italy) 18–21 (England) Northampton Saints
    - Standings: Northampton 13 points (4 matches), Munster 10 (3), Perpignan 6 (3), Treviso 5 (4).
  - Pool 2: Newport Gwent Dragons (Wales) 8–26 (France) Biarritz
    - Standings: Biarritz 18 points (4 matches), Newport 5 (4), Glasgow 5 (3), Gloucester 4 (3).
  - Pool 3:
    - Ospreys (Wales) 45–19 (Italy) ~~Viadana~~
    - Leicester Tigers (England) 20–15 (France) Clermont Auvergne
      - Standings: Ospreys 16 points, Leicester, Clermont 12, Viadana 0.
  - Pool 4: Edinburgh (Scotland) 9–6 (England) Bath
    - Standings: Stade Français, Ulster 9 points (3 matches), Edinburgh 9 (4), Bath 6 (4).
  - Pool 5: Toulouse (France) 23–7 (Wales) Cardiff Blues
    - Standings: Toulouse 14 points (4 matches), Sale 9 (3), Cardiff 9 (4), Harlequin 1 (3).
  - Pool 6:
    - London Irish (England) 34–13 (France) ~~Brive~~
    - Leinster (Ireland) 39–7 (Wales) Scarlets
      - Standings: Leinster, London Irish 15, Scarlets 8, Brive 0.
- Amlin Challenge Cup pool stage, matchday 4: (teams in ~~strike~~ are eliminated)
  - Pool 2: ~~Olympus Madrid~~ (Spain) 6–42 (France) Montpellier
    - Standings: Connacht 17 points, Montpellier 15, ~~Worcester~~ 7, Madrid 0.
  - Pool 3:
    - Rovigo (Italy) – (France) Toulon, postponed to Sunday (snow)
    - Saracens (England) 18–14 (France) Castres Olympique
      - Standings: Toulon 13 points (3 matches), Saracens 13 (4), Castres 6 (4), Rovigo 0 (3).
  - Pool 4: ~~Rugby Roma Olimpic~~ (Italy) 3–53 (France) Racing Métro
    - Standings: London Wasps 17 points, Racing Métro 12, Bayonne 10, Roma 0.
  - Pool 5: Albi (France) – (Italy) Petrarca Padova postponed

==== Ski jumping ====
- World Cup in Engelberg, Switzerland:
  - HS 137: (gold) Gregor Schlierenzauer (AUT) 265.6 points (137.0 m, 130.0 m) (silver) Simon Ammann (SUI) 264.6 (138.0, 129.0) (bronze) Andreas Kofler (AUT) 250.5 (132.0, 128.0)
    - Overall standings (after 5 of 23 events): (1) Schlierenzauer 342 (2) Ammann 324 points (3) Kofler 226

==== Snowboarding ====
- World Cup in Telluride, United States:
  - Men's snowboard cross: (gold) Pierre Vaultier (FRA) (silver) Robert Fagan (CAN) (bronze) Ross Powers (USA)
    - Standings after 2 of 7 events: (1) Vaultier 2000 points (2) Seth Wescott (USA) 1200 (3) Fagan 1090
  - Women's snowboard cross: (gold) Maëlle Ricker (CAN) (silver) Simona Meiller (SUI) (bronze) Dominique Maltais (CAN)
    - Standings after 2 of 7 events: (1) Ricker 2000 points (2) Maltais 1200 (3) Aleksandra Zhekova (BUL) 1160

==== Volleyball ====
- NCAA Division I women's tournament:
  - Championship game in Tampa, Florida: Penn State 3, Texas 2.
    - The Nittany Lions rally from a 2-set deficit to win the title for the third straight time and extend their winning streak to 102 games.

=== December 18, 2009 (Friday) ===
==== Alpine skiing ====
- Men's World Cup in Val Gardena, Italy:
  - Super-G: (gold) Aksel Lund Svindal (NOR) 1:38.35 (silver) Carlo Janka (SUI) 1:38.47 (bronze) Patrick Staudacher (ITA) 1:38.52
    - Overall standings (after 11 of 34 races): (1) Janka 540 points (2) Benjamin Raich (AUT) 515 (3) Svindal 388
    - Super-G standings (after 3 of 6 races): (1) Michael Walchhofer (AUT) 180 (2) Raich & Svindal 154
- Women's World Cup in Val-d'Isère, France:
  - Super combined: (gold) Lindsey Vonn (USA) 2:37.55 (silver) Maria Riesch (GER) 2:38.71 (bronze) Elisabeth Görgl (AUT) 2:38.91
    - Overall standings (after 10 of 33 races): (1) Riesch & Vonn 521 (3) Kathrin Zettel (AUT) 362

==== American football ====
- NCAA Division I FCS:
  - NCAA Division I Football Championship Game in Chattanooga, Tennessee (seeds in parentheses):
    - (2) Villanova 23, (1) Montana 21

==== Cricket ====
- England in South Africa:
  - 1st Test in Centurion, day 3:
    - South Africa 418 & 9/1 (4.0 ov); England 356. South Africa led by 71 runs with 9 wickets remaining.
- West Indies in Australia:
  - 3rd Test in Perth, day 3:
    - Australia 520/7d & 137/8 (47.0 ov); West Indies 312. Australia led by 345 runs with 2 wickets remaining.
- Sri Lanka in India:
  - 2nd ODI in Visakhapatnam:
    - India 301/7 (50 ov, MS Dhoni 107); Sri Lanka 302/7 (49.1 ov, Tillakaratne Dilshan 123). **Sri Lanka win by 3 wickets. 5-match series level 1–1**.

==== Handball ====
- World Women's Championship in China:
  - Semifinals:
    - France 27–23 Spain
    - Norway 20–28 Russia

==== Ice hockey ====
- New Jersey Devils goaltender Martin Brodeur makes his 1,030th NHL regular-season appearance, breaking the league record for goaltenders previously held by Patrick Roy, as the Devils beat the Ottawa Senators 4–2. (AP via ESPN)

==== Nordic combined ====
- World Cup in Ramsau, Austria:
  - HS98 / 10 km: (gold) Jason Lamy Chappuis (FRA) 22:03.6 (silver) Felix Gottwald (AUT) 22:06.3 (bronze) Magnus Moan (NOR) 22:10.7
    - Overall standings (after 5 of 19 events): (1) Lamy-Chappuis 405 points (2) Tino Edelmann (GER) 304 (3) Eric Frenzel (GER) 240

==== Rugby union ====
- Amlin Challenge Cup pool stage, matchday 4: (teams in ~~strike~~ are eliminated)
  - Pool 2: Connacht (Ireland) 19–7 (England) Worcester Warriors
    - Standings: Connacht 17 points (4 matches), Montpellier 10 (3), Worcester 7 (4), ~~Olympus Madrid~~ 0 (3).
  - Pool 5: Montauban (France) 24–19 (England) Newcastle Falcons
    - Standings: Newcastle 15 points (4 matches), Montauban 12, Albi 5 (3), Padova 1 (3).

==== Six-red snooker ====
- Six-red World Championship in Killarney, Ireland:
  - Final: Mark Davis (ENG) def. Mark Williams (WAL) 6–3

==== Ski jumping ====
- World Cup in Engelberg, Switzerland:
  - HS 137: (gold) Simon Ammann (SUI) 270.4 points (137.5 m, 133.0 m) (silver) Gregor Schlierenzauer (AUT) 268.2 (136.5, 132.5) (bronze) Thomas Morgenstern (AUT) 243.5 (132.5, 125.0)
    - Overall standings (after 4 of 23 events): (1) Ammann 244 points (2) Schlierenzauer 242 (3) Harri Olli (FIN) & Andreas Kofler (AUT) 166

==== Skeleton ====
- World Cup in Altenberg, Germany:
  - Men: (gold) Michi Halilovic (GER) 1:56.39 (silver) Aleksandr Tretyakov (RUS) 1:56.60 (bronze) Frank Rommel (GER) 1:56.63
    - Standings after 5 of 8 events: (1) Martins Dukurs (LAT) 1044 points (2) Rommel 1011 (3) Sandro Stielicke (GER) 892
  - Women: (gold) Kerstin Szymkowiak (GER) 1:59.50 (silver) Marion Trott (GER) 2:00.21 (bronze) Anja Huber (GER) 2:00.28
    - Standings after 5 of 8 events: (1) Mellisa Hollingsworth (CAN) 1011 points (2) Shelley Rudman (GBR) 987 (3) Szymkowiak 954

=== Swimming ===
- World records broken:
  - Long course:
    - Men's 50 m freestyle: César Cielo (BRA) 20.91, São Paulo, Brazil
  - Short course:
    - Men's 4 × 100 m medley relay: United States (Nick Thoman, Mark Gangloff, Michael Phelps, Nathan Adrian) 3:20.71, Manchester, Great Britain
    - Women's 200 m breast: Rebecca Soni (USA) 2:14.57, Manchester, Great Britain
    - Women's 400 m medley: Julia Smit (USA) 4:21.04, Manchester, Great Britain
    - Women's 4 × 100 m medley relay: United States (Margaret Hoelzer, Jessica Hardy, Dana Vollmer, Amanda Weir) 3:47.97, Manchester, Great Britain

=== December 17, 2009 (Thursday) ===
==== American football ====
- National Football League Week 15 Thursday Night Football (unbeaten team and division champion in **bold**):
  - **Indianapolis Colts** 35, Jacksonville Jaguars 31
    - The Colts extend their record regular-season win streak to 23, and become the third team in NFL history to start a season 14–0.

==== Basketball ====
- Euroleague Regular Season Game 8: (teams in **bold** advance to the Top-16 round, teams in ~~strike~~ are eliminated)
  - Group A:
    - **Regal FC Barcelona** (Spain) 89–55 (Lithuania) Žalgiris Kaunas
      - Standings: Barcelona 8–0; **Siena** 7–1; ASVEL, Fenerbahçe Ülker 3–5; Cibona 2–6; Žalgiris 1–7.
  - Group B:
    - Efes Pilsen Istanbul (Turkey) 77–79 (Spain) **Unicaja Málaga**
    - ~~Entente Orléans Loiret~~ (France) 75–72 (Serbia) Partizan Belgrade
      - Standings: **Olympiacos**, Unicaja 6–2; Lietuvos Rytas, Partizan 4–4; Efes Pilsen 3–5; Orléans 1–7.
  - Group C:
    - **CSKA Moscow** (Russia) 77–72 (Israel) Maccabi Tel Aviv
      - Standings: CSKA, **Caja Laboral** 6–2; Maccabi 5–3; Maroussi, Roma 3–5; ~~Olimpija~~ 1–7.
  - Group D:
    - **Panathinaikos Athens** (Greece) 67–76 (Spain) **Real Madrid**
    - Armani Jeans Milano (Italy) 82–69 (Poland) Asseco Prokom Gdynia
      - Standings: Real Madrid, Panathinaikos 6–2; Khimki 5–3; Milano, Asseco Prokom 3–5; EWE Baskets 1–7.

==== Biathlon ====
- World Cup 3 in Pokljuka, Slovenia:
  - 15 km individual women: (gold) Helena Jonsson (SWE) 43:04.1 (0 penalties) (silver) Anna Carin Olofsson-Zidek (SWE) 43:26.7 (1) (bronze) Anastasiya Kuzmina (SVK) 43:31.4 (1)
    - Overall standings after 5 of 25 events: (1) Jonsson 277 points (2) Olofsson-Zidek 234 (3) Olga Medvedtseva (RUS) 184
    - Individual standings after 2 of 4 events: (1) Jonsson 120 points (2) Olofsson-Zidek 108 (3) Valj Semerenko (UKR) 74
  - 20 km individual men: (gold) Christoph Sumann (AUT) 52:19.8 (1 penalty) (silver) Simon Fourcade (FRA) 52:34.0 (1) (bronze) Alexander Os (NOR) 52:50.5 (1)
    - Overall standings after 5 of 25 events: (1) Sumann 225 (2) Emil Hegle Svendsen (NOR) 206 (3) Tim Burke (USA) 181
    - Individual standings after 2 of 4 events: (1) Sumann 108 points (2) Burke 81 (3) Fourcade 79

==== Cricket ====
- England in South Africa:
  - 1st Test in Centurion, day 2:
    - South Africa 418 (Jacques Kallis 120); England 88/1 (23.0 ov). England trail by 330 runs with 9 wickets remaining in the 1st innings.
- West Indies in Australia:
  - 3rd Test in Perth, day 2:
    - Australia 520/7d; West Indies 214/2 (46.0 ov, Chris Gayle 102). West Indies trail by 306 runs with 8 wickets remaining in the 1st innings.

==== Football (soccer) ====
- UEFA Europa League group stage, Matchday 6: (teams in **bold** advance to the round of 32)
  - Group A:
    - **Ajax** (Netherlands) 1–3 (Belgium) **Anderlecht**
    - Dinamo Zagreb (Croatia) 1–2 (Romania) Timişoara
      - Final standings: Anderlecht, Ajax 11 points, Dinamo Zagreb 6, Timişoara 5.
  - Group B:
    - **Lille** (France) 3–1 (Czech Republic) Slavia Prague
    - Genoa (Italy) 1–2 (Spain) **Valencia**
      - Final standings: Valencia 12 points, Lille 10, Genoa 7, Slavia Prague 3.
  - Group C:
    - **Hapoel Tel Aviv** (Israel) 1–0 (Germany) **Hamburg**
    - Rapid Wien (Austria) 3–3 (Scotland) Celtic
      - Final standings: Hapoel Tel Aviv 12 points, Hamburg 10, Celtic 6, Rapid Wien 5.
  - Group G:
    - Lazio (Italy) 0–1 (Bulgaria) Levski Sofia
    - **Villarreal** (Spain) 0–1 (Austria) **Red Bull Salzburg**
      - Final standings: Red Bull Salzburg 18 points, Villarreal 9, Lazio 6, Levski Sofia 3.
  - Group H:
    - Steaua București (Romania) 1–1 (Netherlands) **Twente**
    - **Fenerbahçe** (Turkey) 1–0 (Moldova) Sheriff Tiraspol
      - Final standings: Fenerbahçe 15 points, Twente 8, Sheriff Tiraspol 5, Steaua București 4.
  - Group I:
    - **Benfica** (Portugal) 2–1 (Greece) AEK Athens
    - **Everton** (England) 0–1 (Belarus) BATE Borisov
      - Final standings: Benfica 15 points, Everton 9, BATE 7, AEK Athens 4.

==== Handball ====
- World Women's Championship in China:
  - 9th place: Austria 25–41 Hungary
  - 11th place: Angola 26–25 China
  - 7th place: Germany 35–25 Romania
  - 5th place: Denmark 33–31 South Korea

==== Rugby union ====
- Amlin Challenge Cup pool stage, matchday 4: (teams in ~~strike~~ are eliminated)
  - Pool 1: Bourgoin (France) 31–10 (Italy) ~~Overmach Parma~~
    - Standings: Bourgoin 14 points (4 matches), Leeds Carnegie 9 (3), Bucharest Oaks 6 (3), Overmach Parma 4 (4).
  - Pool 4: Bayonne (France) 3–12 (England) London Wasps
    - Standings: London Wasps 17 points (4 matches), Bayonne 10 (4), Racing Métro 7 (3), ~~Roma~~ 0 (3).

==== Snowboarding ====
- World Cup in Telluride, United States:
  - Men's parallel giant slalom: (gold) Jasey Jay Anderson (CAN) (silver) Michael Lambert (CAN) (bronze) Rok Flander (SLO)
    - Standings (after 3 of 9 events): (1) Benjamin Karl (AUT) 2060 points (2) Anderson 2050 (3) Mathieu Bozzetto (FRA) 1560
  - Women's parallel giant slalom: (gold) Alena Zavarzina (RUS) (silver) Marion Kreiner (AUT) (bronze) Ina Meschik (AUT)
    - Standings (after 3 of 9 events): (1) Amelie Kober (GER) 2060 (2) Doris Guenther (AUT) 1700 (3) Claudia Riegler (AUT) 1500

=== December 16, 2009 (Wednesday) ===
==== Basketball ====
- Euroleague Regular Season Game 8: (teams in **bold** advance to the Top-16 round, teams in ~~strike~~ are eliminated)
  - Group A:
    - Cibona Zagreb (Croatia) 80–77 (Turkey) Fenerbahçe Ülker İstanbul
    - **Montepaschi Siena** (Italy) 83–74 (France) ASVEL Villeurbanne
      - Standings: **Barcelona** 7–0, Siena 7–1, ASVEL, Fenerbahçe Ülker 3–5, Cibona 2–6, Žalgiris 1–6.
  - Group B:
    - Lietuvos Rytas Vilnius (Lithuania) 83–89 (OT) (Greece) Olympiacos Piraeus
      - Standings: Olympiacos 6–2, Unicaja 5–2, Partizan 4–3, Lietuvos Rytas 4–4, Efes Pilsen 3–4, ~~Orléans~~ 0–7.
  - Group C:
    - **Caja Laboral Baskonia** (Spain) 62–53 (Slovenia) ~~Union Olimpija Ljubljana~~
    - Lottomatica Roma (Italy) 74–87 (Greece) Maroussi Athens
      - Standings: Caja Laboral 6–2, Maccabi, **CSKA Moscow** 5–2, Maroussi, Roma 3–5, Olimpija 1–7.
  - Group D:
    - EWE Baskets Oldenburg (Germany) 49–62 (Russia) Khimki Moscow Region
      - Standings: **Panathinaikos** 6–1, Real Madrid 5–2, Khimki 5–3, Asseco Prokom 3–4, Milano 2–5, EWE Baskets 1–7.

==== Cricket ====
- England in South Africa:
  - 1st Test in Centurion, day 1:
    - South Africa 262/4 (Jacques Kallis 112*)
- West Indies in Australia:
  - 3rd Test in Perth, day 1:
    - Australia 339/3
      - Simon Katich is dismissed on 99 for the second time in his career.

==== Football (soccer) ====
- FIFA Club World Cup in Abu Dhabi, United Arab Emirates:
  - Fifth place match: TP Mazembe (Democratic Republic of the Congo) 2–3 (New Zealand) Auckland City
  - Semifinal 2: Atlante (Mexico) 1–3 (Spain) Barcelona
- UEFA Europa League group stage, Matchday 6: (teams in **bold** advance to the round of 32)
  - Group D:
    - **Hertha BSC** (Germany) 1–0 (Portugal) **Sporting CP**
    - Heerenveen (Netherlands) 5–0 (Latvia) Ventspils
      - Final standings: Sporting CP 11 points, Hertha BSC 10, Heerenveen 8, Ventspils 3.
  - Group E:
    - CSKA Sofia (Bulgaria) 0–3 (Italy) **Roma**
    - Basel (Switzerland) 2–3 (England) **Fulham**
      - Final standings: Roma 13 points, Fulham 11, Basel 9, CSKA Sofia 1.
  - Group F:
    - **Panathinaikos** (Greece) 3–0 (Romania) Dinamo București
    - Sturm Graz (Austria) 1–0 (Turkey) **Galatasaray**
      - Final standings: Galatasaray 13 points, Panathinaikos 12, Dinamo București 6, Sturm Graz 4.
  - Group J:
    - **Club Brugge** (Belgium) 1–0 (France) Toulouse
    - Partizan (Serbia) 1–0 (Ukraine) **Shakhtar Donetsk**
      - Final standings: Shakhtar Donetsk 13 points, Club Brugge 11, Toulouse 7, Partizan 3.
  - Group K:
    - Sparta Prague (Czech Republic) 0–3 (Denmark) **Copenhagen**
    - CFR Cluj (Romania) 0–2 (Netherlands) **PSV Eindhoven**
      - Final standings: PSV Eindhoven 14 points, Copenhagen 10, Sparta Prague 7, CFR Cluj 3.
  - Group L:
    - **Athletic Bilbao** (Spain) 0–3 (Germany) **Werder Bremen**
    - Nacional (Portugal) 5–1 Austria Wien
      - Final standings: Werder Bremen 16 points, Athletic Bilbao 10, Nacional 5, Austria Wien 2.
- (Colombia) Colombian Primera A Clausura Final, first leg:
  - Atlético Huila 0–1 Independiente Medellín

=== December 15, 2009 (Tuesday) ===
==== Basketball ====
- 2010 FIBA World Championship Draw:
  - Group A: Argentina Serbia Australia Germany Angola Jordan
  - Group B: United States Slovenia Brazil Croatia Iran Tunisia
  - Group C: Greece Turkey Puerto Rico Russia China Ivory Coast
  - Group D: Spain France Canada Lithuania New Zealand Lebanon

==== Cricket ====
- Pakistan in New Zealand:
  - 3rd Test in Napier, day 5:
    - Pakistan 223 and 455; New Zealand 471 and 90/0. **Match drawn. 3-match series drawn 1–1**.
- Sri Lanka in India:
  - 1st ODI in Rajkot:
    - India 414/7 (50 ov, Virender Sehwag 146); Sri Lanka 411/8 (50 ov, Tillakaratne Dilshan 160). **India win by 3 runs, lead the 5-match series 1–0**

==== Football (soccer) ====
- FIFA Club World Cup in Abu Dhabi, United Arab Emirates:
  - Semifinal 1: Pohang Steelers (South Korea) 1–2 (Argentina) Estudiantes

==== Handball ====
- World Women's Championship in China: (teams in **bold** advance to the semifinals, teams in ~~strike~~ are eliminated)
  - Group 1 in Yangzhou:
    - ~~Germany~~ 25–21 ~~Angola~~
    - **France** 35–20 ~~Austria~~
    - ~~Denmark~~ 25–30 **Russia**
      - Final standings: France, Russia 8 points, Denmark 6, Germany 4, Austria, Angola 2.
  - Group 2 in Suzhou:
    - ~~Hungary~~ 25–21 ~~China~~
    - **Norway** 27–24 **Spain**
    - ~~Romania~~ 34–34 ~~South Korea~~
      - Final standings: Norway 8 points, Spain 7, Korea 6, Romania 5, Hungary 4, China 0.

==== Snowboarding ====
- World Cup in Telluride, United States:
  - Men's parallel giant slalom: (gold) Matthew Morison (CAN) (silver) Benjamin Karl (AUT) (bronze) Mathieu Bozzetto (FRA)
  - Women's parallel giant slalom: (gold) Fraenzi Maegert-Kohli (SUI) (silver) Amelie Kober (GER) (bronze) Kimiko Zakreski (CAN)

=== December 14, 2009 (Monday) ===
==== American football ====
- NFL Monday Night Football, Week 14:
  - San Francisco 49ers 24, Arizona Cardinals 9

==== Cricket ====
- Pakistan in New Zealand:
  - 3rd Test in Napier, day 4:
    - Pakistan 223 & 347/4 (141.0 ov); New Zealand 471. Pakistan led by 99 runs with 6 wickets remaining.

=== December 13, 2009 (Sunday) ===
==== Alpine skiing ====
- Men's World Cup in Val-d'Isère, France:
  - Giant slalom: (gold) Marcel Hirscher (AUT) 2:16.28 (silver) Massimiliano Blardone (ITA) 2:17.05 (bronze) Benjamin Raich (AUT) 2:17.60
    - Giant slalom standings (after 3 of 7 races): (1) Raich 185 points (2) Carlo Janka (SUI) 160 (3) Ted Ligety (USA) 156
    - Overall standings (after 10 of 34 races): (1) Raich 486 points (2) Janka 460 (3) Didier Cuche (SUI) 384
- Women's World Cup in Åre, Sweden:
  - Slalom: (gold) Sandrine Aubert (FRA) 1:43.24 (silver) Maria Riesch (GER) 1:43.69 (bronze) Susanne Riesch (GER) 1:44.20
    - Slalom standings (after 3 of 8 races): (1) Maria Riesch 225 points (2) Šárka Záhrobská (CZE) 168 (3) Susanne Riesch 160
    - Overall standings (after 9 of 33 races): (1) Maria Riesch 441 points (2) Lindsey Vonn (USA) 421 (3) Kathrin Zettel (AUT) 330

==== American football ====
- NFL Week 14 (division champions in **bold**; teams clinching a playoff berth in italics):
  - **New Orleans Saints** 26, Atlanta Falcons 23
    - The Saints remain unbeaten and secure a first-round bye in the NFC playoffs.
  - Green Bay Packers 21, Chicago Bears 14
  - **Indianapolis Colts** 28, Denver Broncos 16
    - The Colts set a new NFL record with their 22nd consecutive regular-season win, and also secure home-field advantage throughout the AFC playoffs. The Broncos' Brandon Marshall sets an NFL single-game record with 21 receptions.
  - Buffalo Bills 16, Kansas City Chiefs 10
  - Minnesota Vikings 30, Cincinnati Bengals 10
  - New England Patriots 20, Carolina Panthers 10
  - New York Jets 26, Tampa Bay Buccaneers 3
  - Miami Dolphins 14, Jacksonville Jaguars 10
  - Baltimore Ravens 48, Detroit Lions 3
  - Houston Texans 34, Seattle Seahawks 7
  - Washington Redskins 34, Oakland Raiders 13
  - Tennessee Titans 47, St. Louis Rams 7
  - San Diego Chargers 20, Dallas Cowboys 17
  - Sunday Night Football: Philadelphia Eagles 45, New York Giants 38

==== Biathlon ====
- World Cup 2 in Hochfilzen, Austria:
  - 4 x 6 km relay women: (gold) Russia (Svetlana Sleptsova, Anna Boulygina, Iana Romanova, Olga Zaitseva) 1:13.37.0 (0 penalty, 6 reloads) (silver) France (Marie-Laure Brunet, Sylvie Becaert, Marie Dorin, Sandrine Bailly) 1:13:40.8 (0, 7) (bronze) Sweden (Elisabeth Högberg, Anna Carin Olofsson-Zidek, Anna-Maria Nilsson, Helena Jonsson) 1:13:41.6 (0, 3)
    - Standings (after two of five events): (1) Russia 114 points (2) Germany 103 (3) France 102
  - 4 x 7.5 km relay men: (gold) Austria (Simon Eder, Daniel Mesotitsch, Dominik Landertinger, Christoph Sumann) 1:16:13.1 (0 penalty loops, 6 reloads) (silver) Russia (Ivan Tcherezov, Evgeny Ustyugov, Nikolay Kruglov Jr., Maxim Tchoudov) 1:16:38.8 (1, 5) (bronze) Germany (Christoph Stephan, Arnd Peiffer, Michael Greis, Simon Schempp 1:16:45.1 (0, 5)
    - Standings (after two of five events): (1) Austria 108 points (2) France 103 (3) Russia 97

==== Bobsleigh ====
- World Cup in Winterberg, Germany:
  - Four-man: (gold) United States (Steven Holcomb, Justin Olsen, Steve Mesler, Curtis Tomasevicz) 1:50.70 (silver) Germany (André Lange, René Hoppe, Kevin Kuske, Martin Putze) 1:50.80 (bronze) Germany (Karl Angerer, Andreas Udvari, Alex Mann, Gregor Bermbach) 1:50.95
    - Standings (after 4 of 8 races): (1) Holcomb 843 points (2) Jānis Miņins (LAT) 754 (3) Lyndon Rush (CAN) 721

==== Cricket ====
- Pakistan in New Zealand:
  - 3rd Test in Napier, day 3:
    - Pakistan 223 & 128/0 (56.0 ov); New Zealand 471 (Daniel Vettori 134). Pakistan trail by 120 runs with 10 wickets remaining.

==== Cross-country skiing ====
- World Cup in Davos, Switzerland:
  - Women's sprint freestyle: (gold) Petra Majdič (SLO) (silver) Marit Bjørgen (NOR) (bronze) Aino-Kaisa Saarinen (FIN)
    - Overall standings (after 6 of 20 events): (1) Majdič 272 points (2) Saarinen 263 (3) Bjørgen 262
    - Sprint standings (after 3 events): (1) Majdič 200 points (2) Hanna Falk (SWE) 176 (3) Vesna Fabjan (SLO) 114
  - Men's sprint freestyle: (gold) John Kristian Dahl (NOR) (silver) Petter Northug (NOR) (bronze) Alexey Petukhov (RUS)
    - Overall standings (after 6 of 20 events): (1) Northug 240 points (2) Dahl 200 (3) Petukhov 160
    - Sprint standings (after 3 events): (1) Dahl 200 points (2) Petukhov 160 (3) Ola Vigen Hattestad (NOR) 160

==== Football (soccer) ====
- CECAFA Cup in Kenya:
  - Third place playoff: (bronze) Zanzibar 1–0 Tanzania
  - Final: (gold) **Uganda** 2–0 (silver) Rwanda
    - Uganda win the title for the second straight time and 11th overall.
- South Asian Football Federation Cup Final in Dhaka, Bangladesh:
  - Maldives 0–0 (1–3 pen.) **India**
    - India win the title for the fifth time.
- (Argentina) Argentine Primera División – Apertura, final matchday:
  - (12) Boca Juniors 2–0 (1) **Banfield**
  - (2) Newell's Old Boys 0–2 (8) San Lorenzo
    - Final standings: Banfield 41 points, Newell's Old Boys 39.
      - Banfield win their first ever championship.
- (Uruguay) Primera División Uruguaya – Apertura, final matchday:
  - (10) Cerrito 2–5 (1) **Nacional**
  - (3) Defensor Sporting 2–2 (2) Liverpool
    - Final standings: Nacional 36 points, Liverpool, Defensor Sporting 29.
      - Nacional win the title for the 42nd time.
- (Venezuela) Primera División Venezolana – Apertura, final matchday:
  - (1) Deportivo Italia 0–1 (5) Deportivo Lara
  - (7) Deportivo Anzoátegui 2–0 (2) Caracas
  - (3) **Deportivo Táchira** 1–0 (16) Centro Italo
    - Final standings: Deportivo Táchira 37 points, Deportivo Italia 36, Caracas 35.
      - Deportivo Táchira win the title for the seventh time.
- Primera División de Paraguay – Clausura, final matchday:
  - (1) **Nacional** 0–0 (6) Olimpia
  - (7) Tacuary 1–0 (2) Libertad
    - Standings: Nacional 41 points, Libertad 40.
      - Nacional win their seventh title after a break of 63 years.
- (Peru) Campeonato Descentralizado playoff, second leg: (first leg score in parentheses)
  - **Universitario de Deportes** 1–0 (1–0) Alianza Lima. Universitario win 2–0 on aggregate.
    - Universitario win the title for the 25th time.
- (Mexico) Primera División de México Apertura Liguilla Final, second leg: (first leg score in parentheses)
  - Cruz Azul 1–2 (3–4) **Monterrey**. Monterrey win 6–4 on aggregate.
    - Monterrey win the title for the third time.

==== Golf ====
- European Tour:
  - Alfred Dunhill Championship in Mpumalanga, South Africa:
    - Winner: Pablo Martín (ESP) 271 (−17)
- Off-season men's events:
  - The Shark Shootout in Naples, Florida:
    - Winners: Jerry Kelly & Steve Stricker

==== Handball ====
- World Women's Championship in China: (teams in **bold** advance to the semifinals, teams in ~~strike~~ are eliminated)
  - Group 1 in Yangzhou:
    - ~~Austria~~ 26–29 ~~Germany~~
    - Russia 23–24 France
    - ~~Angola~~ 28–23 Denmark
      - Standings: Russia, France, Denmark 6 points, Austria, Angola, Germany 2.
  - Group 2 in Suzhou:
    - South Korea 28–28 ~~Hungary~~
    - ~~China~~ 19–34 Norway
    - **Spain** 26–25 ~~Romania~~
      - Standings: Spain 7 points, Norway 6, Korea 5, Romania 4, Hungary 2, China 0.

==== Luge ====
- World Cup in Lillehammer, Norway:
  - Women: (gold) Tatjana Hüfner (GER) 1:37.579 (silver) Natalie Geisenberger (GER) 1:37.595 (bronze) Erin Hamlin (USA) 1:37.616
    - World Cup standings (after 4 of 8 events): (1) Hüfner 385 points (2) Geisenberger 355 (3) Anke Wischnewski (GER) 265
  - Men: (gold) Albert Demtschenko (RUS) 1:40.356 (silver) Armin Zöggeler (ITA) 1:40.406 (bronze) Felix Loch (RUS) 1:40.674
    - World Cup standings (after 4 of 8 events): (1) Zöggeler 370 points (2) Loch 290 (3) Demtschenko 279

==== Nine-ball ====
- Mosconi Cup in Las Vegas, Nevada, United States, day 4:
  - Team Europe 7–11 Team USA
    - Ralf Souquet (GER) def. Shane Van Boening (USA) 6–3
    - Dennis Hatch (USA) def. Niels Feijen (NLD) 6–0
    - Thorsten Hohmann (GER) def. Johnny Archer (USA) 6–1
    - Shane Van Boening (USA) def. Ralf Souquet (GER) 6–2
      - Team USA win the Mosconi Cup for the first time in 4 years and 11th time overall.

==== Rugby union ====
- Heineken Cup pool stage, matchday 3:
  - Pool 2: Biarritz (France) 49–13 (Wales) Newport Gwent Dragons
    - Standings: Biarritz 14 points, Newport Gwent Dragons, Glasgow Warriors 5, Gloucester 4.
  - Pool 3: Clermont Auvergne (France) 40–30 (England) Leicester Tigers
    - Standings: Ospreys, Clermont Auvergne 11 points, Leicester Tigers 8, Viadana 0.
  - Pool 4: Bath (England) 16–9 (Scotland) Edinburgh
    - Standings: Stade Français, Ulster 9 points, Bath, Edinburgh 5.
  - Pool 5: Harlequins (England) 19–29 (England) Sale Sharks
    - Standings: Toulouse 10 points, Sale Sharks, Cardiff Blues 9, Harlequins 1.

==== Snooker ====
- Pukka Pies UK Championship in Telford, England:
  - Final:
    - Ding Junhui (CHN) (13) def. John Higgins (SCO) (2) 10–8

==== Snowboarding ====
- World Cup in Seoul, South Korea:
  - Men's big air: (gold) Gian-Luca Cavigelli (SUI) (silver) Stefan Gimpl (AUT) (bronze) Markku Koski (FIN)
    - Standings (after 4 of 5 events): (1) Gimpl 3800 points (2) Cavigelli 3100 (3) Gjermund Braaten (NOR) 1460

==== Speed skating ====
- World Cup 5 in Salt Lake City, United States
  - 1000 m women: (gold) Christine Nesbitt (CAN) 1:13.36 (silver) Wang Beixing (CHN) 1:14.01 (bronze) Nao Kodaira (JPN) 1:14.17
    - Standings after 4 of 7 races: (1) Nesbitt 400 points (2) Annette Gerritsen (NED) 205 (3) Kodaira 202
  - 1000 m men: (gold) Shani Davis (USA) 1:06.67 (silver) Lee Kyou-hyuk (KOR) 1:07.07 (bronze) Mika Poutala (FIN) 1:07.24
    - Standings after 4 of 7 races: (1) Davis 400 points (2) Mo Tae-bum (KOR) 215 (3) Lee 212
  - Team pursuit women: (gold) Russia (Yekaterina Abramova, Galina Likhachova, Yekaterina Shikhova) 2:57.18 (silver) Canada (Kristina Groves, Christine Nesbitt, Cindy Klassen) 2:57.35 (bronze) Germany (Daniela Anschütz-Thoms, Stephanie Beckert, Katrin Mattscherodt) 2:57.36
    - Standings after 3 of 4 races: (1) Canada 280 points (2) Russia 230 (3) Japan 190
  - Team pursuit men: (gold) Norway (Håvard Bøkko, Mikael Flygind-Larsen, Henrik Christiansen) 3:39.55 (silver) Italy (Matteo Anesi, Enrico Fabris, Luca Stefani) 3:39.72 (bronze) Canada (Steven Elm, Lucas Makowsky, Mathieu Giroux) 3:40.34
    - Standings after 3 of 4 races: (1) Netherlands 260 points (2) Norway 230 (3) Canada 186

==== Swimming ====
- European Short Course Championships in Istanbul, Turkey:
  - Women's 50 m freestyle: (gold) Hinkelien Schreuder (NED) 23.32 CR (silver) Ranomi Kromowidjojo (NED) 23.58 (bronze) Dorothea Brandt (GER) 23.74
  - Men's 50 m butterfly: (gold) Johannes Dietrich (GER) 22.07 CR (silver) Frédérick Bousquet (FRA) 22.17 (bronze) Yevgeny Korotyshkin (RUS) 22.34
  - Women's 400 m individual medley: (gold) Hannah Miley (GBR) 4:25.66 (silver) Mireia Belmonte García (ESP) 4:27.60 (bronze) Zsuzsanna Jakabos (HUN) 4:28.46
  - Men's 200 m breaststroke: (gold) Dániel Gyurta (HUN) 2:00.67 WR (silver) Grigory Falko (RUS) 2:02.50 (bronze) Maxim Shcherbakov (RUS) 2:03.76
  - Women's 200 m freestyle: (gold) Federica Pellegrini (ITA) 1:51.17 WR (silver) Evelyn Verrasztó (HUN) 1:52.61 (bronze) Femke Heemskerk (NED) 1:54.20
  - Men's 200 m freestyle: (gold) Paul Biedermann (GER) 1:39.81 CR (silver) Danila Izotov (RUS) 1:40.08 (bronze) Nikita Lobintsev (RUS) 1:41.52
  - Women's 200 m backstroke: (gold) Alexianne Castel (FRA) 2:02.67 (silver) Jenny Mensing (GER) 2:03.31 (bronze) Pernille Larsen (DEN) 2:03.50
  - Men's 4 × 50 m freestyle: (gold) France (Amaury Leveaux, Jérémy Stravius, David Maitre, Frédérick Bousquet) 1:22.96 (silver) Croatia (Duje Draganja, Alexei Puninski, Mario Todorović, Mario Delač) 1:23.18 (bronze) Italy (Marco Orsi, Federico Bocchia, Filippo Magnini, Luca Dotto) 1:23.64

=== December 12, 2009 (Saturday) ===
==== Alpine skiing ====
- Men's World Cup in Val-d'Isère, France:
  - Super-G: (gold) Michael Walchhofer (AUT) 1:20.78 (silver) Ted Ligety (USA) 1:21.06 (bronze) Werner Heel (ITA) 1:21.53
    - Super-G standings (after 2 of 6 races): (1) Walchhofer 160 points (2) Benjamin Raich (AUT) 125 (3) Ligety 112
    - Overall standings (after 9 of 34 races): (1) Carlo Janka (SUI) 460 points (2) Raich 426 (3) Didier Cuche (SUI) 384
- Women's World Cup in Åre, Sweden:
  - Giant slalom: (gold) Tessa Worley (FRA) 2:23.22 (silver) Tina Maze (SLO) 2:23.79 (bronze) Kathrin Zettel (AUT) 2:23.91
    - Giant slalom standings (after 3 of 7 races): (1) Zettel 220 points (2) Kathrin Holzl (GER) 181 (3) Maze 170
    - Overall standings (after 8 of 33 races): (1) Lindsey Vonn (USA) 389 points (2) Maria Riesch (GER) 361 (3) Zettel 280

==== American football ====
- NCAA Division I FBS:
  - Army–Navy Game in Philadelphia: Navy 17, Army 3
    - Navy wins the game for the eighth straight year.
  - Mark Ingram II wins the Heisman Trophy. The Alabama running back edges out his Stanford counterpart Toby Gerhart in the closest vote in the award's history, becoming the Crimson Tide's first Heisman winner and the third straight sophomore to win the award.
- NCAA Division I FCS:
  - Semifinal in Missoula, Montana (unbeaten team in **bold**):
    - (1) **Montana** 24, Appalachian State 17
  - Other games:
    - SWAC Championship Game in Birmingham, Alabama:
      - Prairie View A&M 30, Alabama A&M 24
- NCAA Division II Football Championship in Florence, Alabama:
  - Northwest Missouri State 30, Grand Valley State 23
    - The Bearcats win their third Division II national title and end a streak of four consecutive losses in the championship game.

==== Basketball ====
- 2010 FIBA World Championship:
  - FIBA announces the four wild cards that will participate in the World Championship to be held in Turkey:
    - Germany
    - Lebanon
    - Lithuania
    - Russia

==== Biathlon ====
- World Cup 2 in Hochfilzen, Austria:
  - 10 km pursuit women: (gold) Helena Jonsson (SWE) 34:09.1 (1 penalty) (silver) Svetlana Sleptsova (RUS) 34:40.8 (2) (bronze) Olga ZaitsevaR(RUS) 34:45.1 (2)
    - Overall standings after 4 of 25 events: (1) Jonsson 217 points (2) Anna Carin Olofsson-Zidek (SWE) 180 (3) Sleptsova 152
  - 12.5 km pursuit men: (gold) Emil Hegle Svendsen (NOR) 34:36.7 (1) (silver) Simon Eder (AUT) 34:38.3 (1) (bronze) Ole Einar Bjørndalen (NOR) 34:39.8 (3)
    - Overall standings after 4 of 25 events: (1) Svendsen 206 points (2) Bjørndalen 168 (3) Christoph Sumann (AUT) 165

==== Bobsleigh ====
- World Cup in Winterberg, Germany:
  - Two-man: (gold) Beat Hefti/Thomas Lamparter (SUI) 1:53.17 (silver) Karl Angerer/Gregor Bermbach (GER) 1:53.24 (bronze) Ivo Rüegg/Roman Handschin (SUI) 1:53.28
    - Standings (after 4 of 8 races): (1) Rüegg 810 points (2) Steven Holcomb (USA) 770 (3) Angerer 722
  - Two-woman: (gold) Cathleen Martini/Romy Logsch (GER) 1:56.65 (silver) Sandra Kiriasis/Berit Wiacker (GER) 1:57.26 (bronze) Erin Pac/Elana Meyers (USA) 1:57.27
    - Standings (after 4 of 8 races): (1) Martini 885 points (2) Kiriasis 830 (3) Shauna Rohbock (USA) 753

==== Cricket ====
- Pakistan in New Zealand:
  - 3rd Test in Napier, day 2:
    - Pakistan 223; New Zealand 346/6 (106.0 ov, Daniel Vettori 100*). New Zealand led by 123 runs with 4 wickets remaining in the 1st innings.
- Sri Lanka in India:
  - 2nd T20I in Chandigarh:
    - Sri Lanka 206/7 (20/20 ov); India 211/4 (19.1/20 ov). **India win by 6 wickets. 2-match series drawn 1–1**.

==== Cross-country skiing ====
- World Cup in Davos, Switzerland:
  - Women's 10 km freestyle: (gold) Irina Khazova (RUS) (silver) Charlotte Kalla (SWE) (bronze) Kristina Šmigun-Vähi (EST)
  - Men's 15 km freestyle: (gold) Matti Heikkinen (FIN) (silver) Marcus Hellner (SWE) (bronze) Maurice Manificat (FRA)

==== Curling ====
- European Championships in Aberdeen, Scotland:
- Men, final:
  - (gold) **Sweden** 6–5 (silver) Switzerland (11 ends)
    - Niklas Edin skips Sweden to their sixth title and the first since 2001.
  - Men, world challenge game 2:
    - **Denmark** 10–5 Netherlands
      - Denmark win best-of-3 series 2–0.
  - Women, final:
    - (silver) Switzerland 5–7 (gold) **Germany**
      - Andrea Schöpp skips Germany to her seventh European title, and the first since 1998.
  - Women, world challenge game 2:
    - Finland 3–6 **Latvia**
      - Latvia win best-of-3 series 2–0.

==== Football (soccer) ====
- FIFA Club World Cup in Abu Dhabi, United Arab Emirates:
  - Quarterfinal 2: Auckland City (New Zealand) 0–3 (Mexico) Atlante

==== Freestyle skiing ====
- World Cup at Suomu, Finland:
  - Men's moguls: (gold) Jesper Bjoernlund (SWE) (silver) Bryon Wilson (USA) (bronze) Nathan Roberts (USA)
    - Standings (after 2 of 12 events): (1) Bjoernlund 200 points (2) Wilson 160 (3) Alexandre Bilodeau (CAN) 110
  - Women's moguls: (gold) Hannah Kearney (USA) (silver) Kristi Richards (CAN) (bronze) Jennifer Heil (CAN)
    - Standings (after 2 of 12 events): (1) Richards 180 points (2) Kearney 160 (3) Heil 105

==== Handball ====
- World Women's Championship in China: (teams in **bold** advance to the semifinals, teams in ~~strike~~ are eliminated)
  - Group 1 in Yangzhou:
    - ~~Germany~~ 22–34 Russia
    - France 33–24 ~~Angola~~
    - Denmark 30–27 Austria
      - Standings: Russia, Denmark 6 points, France 4, Austria 2, Angola, Germany 0.
  - Group 2 in Suzhou:
    - Romania 40–19 China
    - Norway 27–28 South Korea
    - Hungary 21–21 Spain
      - Standings: Spain 5 points, Romania, Korea, Norway 4, Hungary 1, China 0.

==== Luge ====
- World Cup in Lillehammer, Norway:
  - Doubles: (gold) Andreas Linger/Wolfgang Linger (AUT) 1:36.829 (silver) Christian Oberstolz/Patrick Gruber (ITA) 1:36.917 (bronze) Gerhard Plankensteiner/Oswald Haselrieder (ITA) 1:37.053
    - World Cup standings (after 4 of 8 events): (1) André Florschütz/Torsten Wustlich (GER) 325 points (2) Patric Leitner/Alexander Resch (GER) 300 (3) Linger/Linger 290

==== Mixed martial arts ====
- UFC 107 in Memphis
  - Lightweight Championship bout: B.J. Penn (USA) def. Diego Sanchez (USA) via TKO (cut) at 2:37 of round 5
    - Penn retain the UFC Lightweight Championship.

==== Nine-ball ====
- Mosconi Cup in Las Vegas, Nevada, United States, day 3:
  - Team Europe 5–9 Team USA
    - Niels Feijen (NLD) / Thorsten Hohmann (GER) def. Dennis Hatch (USA) / Corey Deuel (USA) 6–1
    - Ralf Souquet (GER) / Mika Immonen (FIN) def. Shane Van Boening (USA) / Óscar Domínguez (USA) 6–4
    - Dennis Hatch (USA) def. Niels Feijen (NLD) 6–4
    - Corey Deuel (USA) / Johnny Archer (USA) def. Thorsten Hohmann (GER) / Darren Appleton (ENG) 6–5
    - Mika Immonen (FIN) def. Óscar Domínguez (USA) 6–4

==== Rugby union ====
- Heineken Cup pool stage, matchday 3:
  - Pool 1: Northampton Saints (England) 30–18 (Italy) Benetton Treviso
    - Standings: Munster 10 points, Northampton Saints 9, Perpignan 6, Benetton Treviso 4.
  - Pool 3: Viadana (Italy) 7–62 (Wales) Ospreys
    - Standings: Ospreys 11 points (3 matches), Leicester Tigers 8 (2), Clermont 6 (2), Viadana 0 (3).
  - Pool 4: Ulster (Ireland) 23–13 (France) Stade Français
    - Standings: Stade Français, Ulster 9 points (3 matches), Edinburgh 4 (2), Bath 1 (2).
  - Pool 5: Cardiff Blues (Wales) 15–9 (France) Toulouse
    - Standings: Toulouse 10 points (3 matches), Blues 9 (3), Sale Sharks 4 (2), Harlequins 1 (2).
  - Pool 6:
    - Scarlets (Wales) 7–32 (Ireland) Leinster
    - Brive (France) 3–36 (England) London Irish
      - Standings: London Irish, Leinster 10 points, Scarlets 8, Brive 0.
- Amlin Challenge Cup pool stage, matchday 3:
  - Pool 1:
    - București Oaks (Romania) 6–10 (England) Leeds Carnegie
    - Overmach Parma (Italy) 14–9 (France) Bourgoin
      - Standings: Leeds Carnegie, Bourgoin 9 points, Bucharest Oaks 6, Overmach Parma 4.
  - Pool 2: Worcester Warriors (England) 21–26 (Ireland) Connacht
    - Standings: Connacht 13 points, Montpellier 10 points, Worcester Warriors 7, Olympus Madrid 0.
  - Pool 4:
    - London Wasps (England) 22–18 (France) Bayonne
    - Racing Métro (France) 62–0 (Italy) Rugby Roma Olimpic
      - Standings: London Wasps 13 points, Bayonne 10, Racing Métro 7, Roma 0.
  - Pool 5: Petrarca Padova (Italy) 16–35 (France) Albi
    - Standings: Newcastle Falcons 14 points, Montauban 8, Albi 5, Petrarca Padova 1.
- IRB Sevens World Series:
  - South Africa Sevens in George, Western Cape
    - Cup Final: New Zealand 21–12 Fiji

==== Speed skating ====
- World Cup 5 in Salt Lake City, United States
  - 500 m women: (gold) Wang Beixing (CHN) 37.02 (silver) Jenny Wolf (GER) 37.17 (bronze) Lee Sang-hwa (KOR) 37.24
    - Standings (after 8 of 12 races): (1) Wolf 760 points (2) Wang 680 (3) Lee 505
  - 500 m men: (gold) Lee Kyou-hyuk (KOR) 34.26 (silver) Lee Kang-seok (KOR) 34.28 (bronze) Tucker Fredricks (USA) 34.35
    - Standings (after 8 of 12 races): (1) Lee Kang-seok 523 points (2) Lee Kyou-hyuk 521 (3) Mika Poutala (FIN) 501
  - 1500 m women: (gold) Christine Nesbitt (CAN) 1:52.76 (silver) Kristina Groves (CAN) 1:53.32 (bronze) Jennifer Rodriguez (USA) 1:54.19
    - Standings (after 5 of 6 races): (1) Groves 410 points (2) Nesbitt 360 (3) Ireen Wüst (NED) 257
  - 5000 m men: (gold) Enrico Fabris (ITA) 6:06.06 (silver) Bob de Jong (NED) 6:08.76 (bronze) Ivan Skobrev (RUS) 6:10.58
    - Standings (after 5 of 6 races): (1) Sven Kramer (NED) 400 (2) de Jong 380 (3) Skobrev 325

==== Snooker ====
- Pukka Pies UK Championship in Telford, England:
  - Semi-finals:
    - John Higgins (SCO) (2) def. Ronnie O'Sullivan (ENG) (3) 9–8

==== Swimming ====
- European Short Course Championships in Istanbul, Turkey:
  - Women's 50 m backstroke: (gold) Sanja Jovanović (CRO) 25.70 WR (silver) Aleksandra Gerasimenya (BLR) 26.12 (bronze) Ksenia Moskvina (RUS) 26.38
  - Men's 50 m breaststroke: (gold) Aleksander Hetland (NOR) 26.19 (silver) Alessandro Terrin (ITA) 26.24 (bronze) Csaba Szilágyi (SRB) 26.31
  - Women's 400 m freestyle: (gold) Coralie Balmy (FRA) 3:56.55 (silver) Lotte Friis (DEN) 3:59.06 (bronze) Ophelie Cyrielle Etienne (FRA) 3:59.94
  - Men's 100 m backstroke: (gold) Arkady Vyatchanin (RUS) & Stanislav Donets (RUS) 48.97 WR (bronze) Aschwin Wildeboer (ESP) 49.05
  - Women's 100 m breaststroke: (gold) Caroline Ruhnau (GER) 1:04.84 CR (silver) Moniek Nijhuis (NED) 1:04.96 (bronze) Jennie Johansson (SWE) 1:05.19
  - Men's 100 m individual medley: (gold) Duje Draganja (CRO) 51.20 (silver) Sergey Fesikov (RUS) 51.29 (bronze) Peter Mankoč (SLO) 51.52
  - Women's 100 m butterfly: (gold) Inge Dekker (NED) 55.74 (silver) Diane Bui Duyet (FRA) 55.93 (bronze) Jeanette Ottesen (DEN) 56.02
  - Men's 200 m butterfly: (gold) Nikolay Skvortsov (RUS) 1:49.46 ER (silver) Paweł Korzeniowski (POL) 1:50.13 (bronze) Dinko Jukić (AUT) 1:50.32
  - Women's 4 × 50 m medley relay: (gold) Netherlands (Hinkelien Schreuder, Moniek Nijhuis, Inge Dekker, Ranomi Kromowidjojo) 1:42.69 WBT (silver) Sweden (Emma Svensson, Josefin Lillhage, Sarah Sjöström, Claire Hedenskog) 1:45.13 (bronze) Russia (Ksenia Moskvina, Daria Deeva, Olga Klyuchnikova, Svetlana Fedulova) 1:46.10
  - Men's 1500 m freestyle: (gold) Jan Wolfgarten (GER) 14:20.44 (silver) Federico Colbertaldo (ITA) 14:25.68 (bronze) Mads Glæsner (DEN) 14:26.74

=== December 11, 2009 (Friday) ===
==== Alpine skiing ====
- Men's World Cup in Val-d'Isère, France:
  - Super combined:
    - (gold) Benjamin Raich (AUT) 2:07.71 (silver) Marcel Hirscher (AUT) 2:08.60 (bronze) Manfred Moelgg (ITA) & Romed Baumann (AUT) 2:09.26
      - Overall standings after 8 of 34 races: (1) Carlo Janka (SUI) 460 points (2) Raich 381 (3) Didier Cuche (SUI) 355

==== American football ====
- NCAA Division I FCS:
  - Semifinal in Villanova, Pennsylvania:
    - (2) Villanova 14, William & Mary 13

==== Biathlon ====
- World Cup 2 in Hochfilzen, Austria:
  - 7.5 km sprint women: (gold) Anna Carin Olofsson-Zidek (SWE) 23:10.8 (0 penalty loops) (silver) Helena Jonsson (SWE) 23:21.9 (0) (bronze) Olga Zaitseva (RUS) 24:00.5 (1)
    - Overall standings after 3 of 25 events: (1) Jonsson 157 points (2) Olofsson-Zidek 146 (3) Olga Medvedtseva (RUS) 124
    - Sprint standings after 2 of 10 events: (1) Jonsson 97 points (2) Olofsson-Zidek 92 (3) Medvedtseva 92
  - 10 km sprint men: (gold) Ole Einar Bjørndalen (NOR) 26:14.0 (0) (silver) Nikolay Kruglov Jr. (RUS) 26:20.7 (0) (bronze) Evgeny Ustyugov (RUS) 26:24.1 (1)
    - Overall standings after 3 of 25 events: (1) Emil Hegle Svendsen (NOR) 146 points (2) Tim Burke (USA) 123 (3) Christoph Sumann (AUT) 122
    - Sprint standings after 2 of 10 events: (1) Bjørndalen 120 (2) Svendsen 86 (3) Sumann 74

==== Cricket ====
- Pakistan in New Zealand:
  - 3rd Test in Napier, day 1:
    - Pakistan 223 (Imran Farhat 117*); New Zealand 47/0 (19.0 ov). New Zealand trail by 176 runs with 10 wickets remaining in the 1st innings.

==== Curling ====
- European Championships in Aberdeen, Scotland:
  - Men, semifinal:
    - (bronze) Norway 5–8 **Switzerland**
      - Switzerland will play against Sweden in the Final.
  - Men, world challenge game 1:
    - Denmark 6–2 Netherlands
  - Women, semifinal:
    - (bronze) Denmark 5–6 **Germany**
      - Germany will meet Switzerland in the final.
  - Women, world challenge game 1:
    - Finland 4–6 Latvia

==== Football (soccer) ====
- FIFA Club World Cup in Abu Dhabi, United Arab Emirates:
  - Quarterfinal 1: TP Mazembe (Democratic Republic of the Congo) 1–2 (South Korea) Pohang Steelers

==== Freestyle skiing ====
- World Cup in Suomu, Finland:
  - Men's moguls: (gold) Jesper Bjoernlund (SWE) (silver) Bryon Wilson (USA) (bronze) Alexandre Bilodeau (CAN)
  - Women's moguls: (gold) Kristi Richards (CAN) (silver) Aiko Uemura (JPN) (bronze) Hannah Kearney (USA)

==== Golf ====
- Following a tumultuous two weeks in which he faced allegations of numerous extramarital affairs, Tiger Woods admits to infidelity and announces he is taking an indefinite leave from professional golf in an attempt to save his marriage. (ESPN)

==== Nine-ball ====
- Mosconi Cup in Las Vegas, Nevada, United States, day 2:
  - Team Europe 2–7 Team USA
    - Shane Van Boening (USA) / Johnny Archer (USA) def. Ralf Souquet (GER) / Niels Feijen (NLD) 6–2
    - Thorsten Hohmann (GER) def. Corey Deuel (USA) 6–4
    - Óscar Domínguez (USA) / Dennis Hatch (USA) def. Mika Immonen (FIN) / Darren Appleton (ENG) 6–4
    - Johnny Archer (USA) def. Darren Appleton (ENG) 6–5

==== Rugby union ====
- Heineken Cup pool stage, matchday 3:
  - Pool 1: Munster (Ireland) 24–23 (France) Perpignan
    - Standings: Munster 10 points (3 matches), Perpignan 6 (3), Northampton Saints, Benetton Treviso 4 (2).
  - Pool 2: Glasgow Warriors (Scotland) 33–11 (England) Gloucester
    - Standings: Biarritz 9 points (2 matches), Newport Gwent Dragons 5 (2), Glasgow Warriors 5 (3), Gloucester 4 (3).
- Amlin Challenge Cup pool stage, matchday 3:
  - Pool 2: Montpellier (France) 57–24 (Spain) Olympus Madrid
    - Standings: Montpellier 10 points (3 matches), Connacht 9 (2), Worcester Warriors 6 (2), Olympus Madrid 0 (3).
  - Pool 3:
    - Castres Olympique (France) 9–23 (England) Saracens
    - Toulon (France) 73–3 (Italy) Rovigo
      - Standings: Toulon 13 points, Saracens 9, Castres 5, Rovigo 0.

==== Skeleton ====
- World Cup in Winterberg, Germany:
  - Men: (gold) Martins Dukurs (LAT) 1:59.06 (silver) Frank Rommel (GER) 1:59.81 (bronze) Aleksandr Tretyakov (RUS) 1:59.87
    - Standings after 4 of 8 races: (1) Dukurs 860 points (2) Rommel 811 (3) Sandro Stielicke (GER) 764
  - Women: (gold) Kerstin Szymkowiak (GER) 2:04.72 (silver) Mellisa Hollingsworth (CAN) 2:05.22 (bronze) Svetlana Trunova (RUS) 2:05.49
    - Standings after 4 of 8 races: (1) Hollingsworth 835 points (2) Shelley Rudman (GBR) 819 (3) Szymkowiak 729

==== Speed skating ====
- World Cup 5 in Salt Lake City, United States
  - 500 m women: (gold) Jenny Wolf (GER) 37.00 WR (silver) Wang Beixing (CHN) 37.14 (bronze) Lee Sang-hwa (KOR) 37.24
    - Standings (after 7 of 12 races): (1) Wolf 680 pts (2) Wang 580 (3) Lee 435
  - 500 m men: (gold) Lee Kyou-hyuk (KOR) 34.26 (silver) Yuya Oikawa (JPN) 34.27 (bronze) Mika Poutala (FIN) 34.31
    - Standings (after 7 of 12 races): (1) Poutala 465 pts (2) Lee Kang-seok (KOR) 443 (3) Lee Kyou-hyuk 421
  - 3000 m women: (gold) Martina Sáblíková (CZE) 3:56.29 (silver) Stephanie Beckert (GER) 3:57.78 (bronze) Kristina Groves (CAN) 3:58.67
    - Standings (after 5 of 6 races): (1) Sáblíková 460 points (2) Beckert 430 (3) Daniela Anschütz-Thoms 315
  - 1500 m men: (gold) Shani Davis (USA) 1:41.04 WR (silver) Chad Hedrick (USA) 1:42.19 (bronze) Mo Tae-bum (KOR) 1:42.85
    - Standings (after 5 of 6 races): (1) Davis 480 points (2) Håvard Bøkko (NOR) 350 (3) Hedrick 268

==== Snooker ====
- Pukka Pies UK Championship in Telford, England:
  - Semi-finals:
    - Ding Junhui (CHN) (13) def. Stephen Maguire (ENG) (4) 9–5

==== Swimming ====
- European Short Course Championships in Istanbul, Turkey:
  - Women's 800 m freestyle: (gold) Lotte Friis (DEN) 8:08.02 (silver) Erika Villaécija García (ESP) 8:13.93 (bronze) Ophelie Cyrielle Etienne (FRA) 8:16.20
  - Men's 400 m individual medley: (gold) László Cseh (HUN) 3:57.27 WR (silver) Dávid Verrasztó (HUN) 4:00.10 (bronze) Gal Nevo (ISR) 4:00.55
  - Women's 200 m breaststroke: (gold) Rikke Møller-Pedersen (DEN) 2:16.66 ER (silver) Nađa Higl (SRB) 2:17.52 (bronze) Joline Hoestman (SWE) 2:19.28
  - Men's 100 m breaststroke: (gold) Robin van Aggele (NED) 56.29 ER (silver) Dániel Gyurta (HUN) 56.72 (bronze) Igor Borysik (UKR) 56.97
  - Women's 100 m freestyle: (gold) Inge Dekker (NED) 51.35 CR (silver) Ranomi Kromowidjojo (NED) 51.44 (bronze) Jeanette Ottesen (DEN) 52.18
  - Women's 100 m backstroke: (gold) Ksenia Moskvina (RUS) 56.36 ER (silver) Sanja Jovanović (CRO) 56.93 (bronze) Aleksandra Gerasimenya (BLR) 57.23
  - Men's 100 m butterfly: (gold) Yevgeny Korotyshkin (RUS) 48.93 CR (silver) Peter Mankoč (SLO) 49.65 (bronze) Ivan Lenđer (SRB) 49.79
  - Women's 50 m butterfly: (gold) Inge Dekker (NED) & Hinkelien Schreuder (NED) 25.00 CR (bronze) Ingvild Snildal (NOR) 25.10
  - Men's 50 m backstroke: (gold) Stanislav Donets (RUS) 22.76 ER (silver) Thomas Rupprath (GER) 22.85 (bronze) Aschwin Wildeboer (ESP) 23.07
  - Women's 4 × 50 m freestyle: (gold) Netherlands (Inge Dekker, Hinkelien Schreuder, Saskia de Jonge, Ranomi Kromowidjojo) 1:33.25 WBT (silver) Sweden (Emma Svensson, Josefin Lillhage, Claire Hedenskog, Sarah Sjöström) 1:35.46 (bronze) Germany (Dorothea Brandt, Daniela Samulski, Lisa Vitting, Daniela Schreiber) 1:36.73

=== December 10, 2009 (Thursday) ===
==== American football ====
- NFL Week 14:
  - Cleveland Browns 13, Pittsburgh Steelers 6

==== Basketball ====
- Euroleague Regular Season Game 7: (teams in **bold** advance to the Top-16 round, teams in ~~strike~~ are eliminated)
  - Group A:
    - Cibona Zagreb (Croatia) 68–80 (Spain) **Regal FC Barcelona**
    - Žalgiris Kaunas (Lithuania) 72–83 (Italy) **Montepaschi Siena**
      - Standings: Barcelona 7–0, Siena 6–1, ASVEL, Fenerbahçe Ülker 3–4, Cibona, Žalgiris 1–6.
  - Group B:
    - Olympiacos Piraeus (Greece) 89–68 (Spain) Unicaja Málaga
    - Partizan Belgrade (Serbia) 93–92 (Turkey) Efes Pilsen Istanbul
      - Standings: Olympiacos, Unicaja 5–2, Lietuvos Rytas, Partizan 4–3, Efes Pilsen 3–4, ~~Orléans~~ 0–7.
  - Group C:
    - Maccabi Tel Aviv (Israel) 82–91 (Spain) Caja Laboral Baskonia
    - Lottomatica Roma (Italy) 57–72 (Russia) **CSKA Moscow**
      - Standings: Caja Laboral, CSKA Moscow, Maccabi 5–2, Roma 3–4, Maroussi 2–5, Olimpija 1–6.

==== Curling ====
- European Championships in Aberdeen, Scotland: (teams in **bold** advance to the playoff, teams in italics clinch tiebreak berths, teams in ~~strike~~ are eliminated)
  - Women, draw 9:
    - **Denmark** 7–5 ~~Scotland~~
    - ~~Finland~~ 2–7 **Germany**
    - **Switzerland** 6–7 Russia
    - ~~Norway~~ 2–10 Sweden
    - ~~Italy~~ 9–5 ~~England~~
      - Final standings: Switzerland 7 wins, Denmark, Germany, Sweden, Russia 6, Scotland 5, Norway 4, Finland 3, Italy 2, England 0.
  - Men, tiebreak:
    - **Scotland** 7–2 France
  - Women, tiebreak:
    - Sweden 4–5 **Russia**
  - Men, playoffs: (seeding in parentheses)
    - (1) Norway 3–7 (2) **Sweden**
      - Sweden advance to the final, Norway go to semifinal
    - (3) **Switzerland** 7–3 (4) Scotland
      - Switzerland go to semifinal
  - Women, playoffs: (seeding in parentheses)
    - (1) **Switzerland** 8–5 (2) Denmark
      - Switzerland advance to the final, Denmark go to semifinal
    - (3) **Germany** 10–4 (4) Russia
      - Germany go to semifinal

==== Football (soccer) ====
- CECAFA Cup in Kenya:
  - Semifinals: Tanzania 1–2 **Rwanda**

==== Handball ====
- World Women's Championship in China: (teams in **bold** advance to the Main Round, teams in ~~strike~~ are eliminated)
  - Group A:
    - ~~Congo~~ 28–36 ~~Brazil~~
    - **Germany** 15–29 **France**
    - ~~Sweden~~ 27–23 **Denmark**
      - Final standings: Denmark 8 points, France, Germany, Sweden 6, Brazil 4, Congo 0.
  - Group B:
    - ~~Thailand~~ 25–18 ~~Australia~~
    - **Austria** 31–32 ~~Ukraine~~
    - **Russia** 23–21 **Angola**
      - Final standings: Russia 10 points, Austria, Angola, Ukraine 6, Thailand 2, Australia 0.
  - Group C:
    - ~~Tunisia~~ 34–16 ~~Chile~~
    - **Norway** 25–24 **Romania**
    - **Hungary** 35–28 ~~Japan~~
      - Final standings: Norway 10 points, Romania 8, Hungary 6, Japan, Tunisia 3, Chile 0.
  - Group D:
    - ~~Argentina~~ 24–28 ~~Kazakhstan~~
    - **China** 35–21 ~~Ivory Coast~~
    - **Spain** 28–27 **South Korea**
      - Final standings: Spain 10 points, Korea 8, China 6, Côte d'Ivoire 3, Kazakhstan 2, Argentina 1.

==== Nine-ball ====
- Mosconi Cup in Las Vegas, Nevada, United States, day 1:
  - Team Europe 1–4 Team USA
    - Team USA def. Team Europe 6–4
    - Johnny Archer (USA) / Dennis Hatch (USA) def. Niels Feijen (NLD) / Darren Appleton (ENG) 6–5
    - Shane Van Boening (USA) def. Mika Immonen (FIN) 6–3
    - Corey Deuel (USA) / Óscar Domínguez (USA) def. Ralf Souquet (GER) / Thorsten Hohmann (GER) 6–2
    - Ralf Souquet (GER) def. Óscar Domínguez (USA) 6–5

==== Rugby union ====
- Amlin Challenge Cup pool stage, matchday 3:
  - Pool 5: Newcastle Falcons (England) 17–6 (France) Montauban
    - Standings: Newcastle 14 points (3 matches), Montauban 8 (3), Petrarca Padova 1 (2), Albi 0 (2).
- The Varsity Match in London:
  - Oxford 27–31 Cambridge
    - The Light Blues, captained by former Australia international Dan Vickerman, avenge last year's defeat at the hands of the Dark Blues.

==== Snooker ====
- Pukka Pies UK Championship in Telford, England:
  - Quarter-finals:
    - John Higgins (SCO) (2) def. Liang Wenbo (CHN) 9–2
    - Ronnie O'Sullivan (ENG) (3) def. Mark Selby (ENG) (7) 9–3

==== Swimming ====
- European Short Course Championships in Istanbul, Turkey:
  - Men's 400 m freestyle: (gold) Paul Biedermann (GER) 3:34.55 CR (silver) Nikita Lobintsev (RUS) 3:35.75 (bronze) Mads Glæsner (DEN) 3:36.82
  - Men's 200 m backstroke: (gold) Stanislav Donets (RUS) 1:48.62 CR (silver) Radosław Kawecki (POL) 1:49.13 (bronze) Evgeny Aleshin (RUS) 1:49.31
  - Women's 200 m individual medley: (gold) Evelyn Verrasztó (HUN) 2:04.64 WR (silver) Francesca Segat (ITA) 2:06.21 (bronze) Hannah Miley (GBR) 2:06.96
  - Women's 200 m butterfly: (gold) Aurore Mongel (FRA) 2:03.22 CR (silver) Petra Granlund (SWE) 2:03.82 (bronze) Franziska Hentke (GER) 2:04.68
  - Men's 200 m individual medley: (gold) Markus Rogan (AUT) 1:51.72 ER (silver) Vytautas Janušaitis (LTU) 1:52.22 (bronze) Alan Cabello Forns (ESP) 1:53.04
  - Men's 50 m freestyle: (gold) Frédérick Bousquet (FRA) 20.53 (silver) Duje Draganja (CRO) 20.70 (bronze) Sergey Fesikov (RUS) 20.84
  - Women's 50 m breaststroke: (gold) Moniek Nijhuis (NED) 29.68 CR (silver) Jane Trepp (EST) 29.82 (bronze) Janne Schaefer (GER) 29.92
  - Men's 4 × 50 m medley relay: (gold) Russia (Stanislav Donets, Sergey Geybel, Yevgeny Korotyshkin, Sergey Fesikov) 1:31.80 WBT (silver) Germany (Thomas Rupprath, Hendrik Feldwehr, Johannes Dietrich, Stefan Herbst) 1:32.02 (bronze) France (Benjamin Stasiulis, Hugues Duboscq, Frédérick Bousquet, Amaury Leveaux) 1:32.13

=== December 9, 2009 (Wednesday) ===
==== Basketball ====
- Euroleague Regular Season Game 7: (teams in **bold** advance to the Top-16 round, teams in ~~strike~~ are eliminated)
  - Group A:
    - Fenerbahçe Ülker İstanbul (Turkey) 61–68 (France) ASVEL Villeurbanne
      - Standings: **Barcelona** 6–0, Siena 5–1, Villeurbanne, Fenerbahçe Ülker 3–4, Cibona, Žalgiris 1–5.
  - Group B:
    - Lietuvos Rytas Vilnius (Lithuania) 77–72 (France) ~~Entente Orléans Loiret~~
      - Standings: Unicaja 5–1, Olympiacos 4–2, Lietuvos Rytas 4–3, Efes Pilsen, Partizan 3–3, Orléans 0–7.
  - Group C:
    - Maroussi Athens (Greece) 74–62 (Slovenia) Union Olimpija Ljubljana
      - Standings: Maccabi 5–1, CSKA Moscow, Caja Laboral 4–2, Roma 3–3, Maroussi 2–5, Olimpija 1–6.
  - Group D:
    - Khimki Moscow Region (Russia) 82–87 (OT) (Greece) **Panathinaikos Athens**
    - Asseco Prokom Gdynia (Poland) 82–76 (Spain) Real Madrid
    - Armani Jeans Milano (Italy) 79–51 (Germany) EWE Baskets Oldenburg
      - Standings: Panathinaikos 6–1, Real Madrid 5–2, Khimki 4–3, Asseco Prokom 3–4, Milano 2–5, EWE Baskets 1–6.

==== Cricket ====
- Sri Lanka in India:
  - 1st T20I in Nagpur:
    - Sri Lanka 215/5 (20/20 ov); India 186/9 (20/20 ov). **Sri Lanka win by 29 runs, lead the 2-match series 1–0**.

==== Curling ====
- European Championships in Aberdeen, Scotland: (teams in **bold** advance to the playoff, teams in italics secure tie break berth, teams in ~~strike~~ are eliminated)
  - Men, draw 8:
    - Switzerland 6–5 Scotland
    - **Sweden** 9–1 ~~Finland~~
    - ~~Czech Republic~~ 3–9 **Norway**
    - ~~Denmark~~ 8–2 ~~Italy~~
    - Germany 8–6 France
      - Standings: Norway, Sweden 7 wins, France, Scotland, Switzerland 5, Germany 4, Denmark 3, Czech Republic, Finland 2, Italy 0.
  - Women, draw 8:
    - ~~Italy~~ 9–10 ~~Finland~~
    - Denmark 6–7 **Switzerland**
    - Norway 5–7 Scotland
    - ~~England~~ 7–8 Germany
    - Russia 4–5 Sweden
      - Standings: Switzerland 7 wins, Denmark, Germany, Russia, Scotland, Sweden 5, Norway 4, Finland 3, Italy 1, England 0.
  - Men, draw 9:
    - **Sweden** 3–10 **Norway**
    - Scotland 9–4 ~~Italy~~
    - ~~Finland~~ 6–9 ~~Germany~~
    - ~~Czech Republic~~ 4–10 France
    - **Switzerland** 7–3 ~~Denmark~~
      - Final standings: Norway 8 wins, Sweden 7, Switzerland, Scotland, France 6, Germany 5, Denmark 3, Finland, Czech Republic 2, Italy 0.

==== Football (soccer) ====
- CECAFA Cup in Kenya:
  - Semifinals: **Uganda** 2–1 Zanzibar
- FIFA Club World Cup in Abu Dhabi, United Arab Emirates:
  - First round: **Auckland City** (New Zealand) 2–0 (United Arab Emirates) Al-Ahli
- UEFA Champions League group stage, Matchday 6: (teams in **bold** advance to the round of 16, teams in italics advance to the round of 32 in Europa League, teams in ~~strike~~ are eliminated)
  - Group E:
    - Liverpool (England) 1–2 (Italy) **Fiorentina**
    - **Lyon** (France) 4–0 (Hungary) ~~Debrecen~~
      - Final standings: Fiorentina 15 points, Lyon 13, Liverpool 7, Debrecen 0.
  - Group F:
    - **Internazionale** (Italy) 2–0 (Russia) Rubin Kazan
    - ~~Dynamo Kyiv~~ (Ukraine) 1–2 (Spain) **Barcelona**
      - Final standings: Barcelona 11 points, Inter 9, Rubin Kazan 6, Dynamo Kyiv 5.
  - Group G:
    - **Stuttgart** (Germany) 3–1 (Romania) Unirea Urziceni
    - **Sevilla** (Spain) 1–0 (Scotland) ~~Rangers~~
      - Final standings: Sevilla 13 points, Stuttgart 9, Unirea Urziceni 8, Rangers 2.
  - Group H:
    - **Olympiacos** (Greece) 1–0 (England) **Arsenal**
    - Standard Liège (Belgium) 1–1 (Netherlands) ~~AZ~~
      - Final standings: Arsenal 13 points, Olympiacos 10, Standard Liège 5, AZ 4.
- (Chile) Primera División Chilena Clausura playoff final, second leg: (first leg score in parentheses)
  - Universidad Católica 2–4 (2–2) **Colo-Colo**. Colo-Colo win 6–4 on aggregate.
    - Colo-Colo win the championship for the 29th time.

==== Handball ====
- World Women's Championship in China: (teams in **bold** advance to the Main Round, teams in ~~strike~~ are eliminated)
  - Group A:
    - France 29–22 ~~Congo~~
    - Brazil 21–28 **Denmark**
    - Sweden 27–33 Germany
      - Standings: Denmark 8 points, Germany 6, Sweden, France 4, Brazil 2, Congo 0.
  - Group B:
    - Angola 36–16 ~~Thailand~~
    - ~~Australia~~ 7–40 Ukraine
    - Austria 19–32 **Russia**
      - Standings: Russia 8 points, Austria, Angola 6, Ukraine 4, Thailand, Australia 0.
  - Group C:
    - ~~Chile~~ 19–38 Japan
    - Hungary 19–25 **Norway**
    - **Romania** 39–22 ~~Tunisia~~
      - Standings: Romania, Norway 8 points, Hungary 4, Japan 3, Tunisia 1, Chile 0.
  - Group D:
    - ~~Kazakhstan~~ 22–30 Ivory Coast
    - China 12–27 **Spain**
    - **South Korea** 36–15 ~~Argentina~~
      - Standings: Spain, Korea 8 points, China 4, Côte d'Ivoire 3, Argentina 1, Kazakhstan 0.

==== Snooker ====
- Pukka Pies UK Championship in Telford, England:
  - Quarter-finals:
    - Ding Junhui (CHN) (13) def. Ali Carter (ENG) (5) 9–8
    - Stephen Maguire (SCO) (4) def. Peter Lines (ENG) 9–5

=== December 8, 2009 (Tuesday) ===
==== Cricket ====
- West Indies in Australia:
  - 2nd Test in Adelaide, day 5:
    - West Indies 451 and 317 (Chris Gayle 165*); Australia 439 and 212/5. **Match drawn, Australia lead the 3-match series 1–0**.
- ICC Intercontinental Shield:
  - Namibia v United Arab Emirates in Windhoek, day 4:
    - Namibia 369 & 237; United Arab Emirates 297 & 311/6 (64.1 ov, Khurram Khan 109). **United Arab Emirates win by 4 wickets**.
      - Standings (1 match each): Uganda 20 points, UAE 14, Namibia 6, Bermuda 0.

==== Curling ====
- European Championships in Aberdeen, Scotland: (teams in **bold** advance to the playoff, teams in italics secure tie break berth, teams in ~~strike~~ are eliminated)
  - Men, draw 6:
    - Czech Republic 5–10 Sweden
    - Germany 7–10 Scotland
    - Switzerland 13–4 ~~Italy~~
    - France 7–5 Norway
    - ~~Denmark~~ 9–3 Finland
      - Standings: Scotland, Norway, Sweden, France 5 wins, Switzerland 3, Czech Republic, Finland, Germany 2, Denmark 1, Italy 0.
  - Women, draw 6:
    - Norway 9–3 Denmark
    - Russia 7–8 Finland
    - Italy 4–7 Germany
    - Sweden 2–8 Scotland
    - ~~England~~ 2–8 Switzerland
      - Standings: Russia, Switzerland 5 wins, Sweden, Denmark 4, Germany, Scotland, Norway 3, Finland 2, Italy 1, England 0.
  - Men, draw 7:
    - ~~Italy~~ 1–9 Germany
    - ~~Czech Republic~~ 4–7 ~~Denmark~~
    - Sweden 6–5 France
    - ~~Finland~~ 2–8 Switzerland
    - Scotland 5–9 Norway
      - Standings: Norway, Sweden 6 wins, France, Scotland 5, Switzerland 4, Germany 3, Czech Republic, Denmark, Finland 2, Italy 0.
  - Women, draw 7:
    - Germany 6–3 Russia
    - Norway 9–7 ~~England~~
    - Denmark 5–4 Sweden
    - Switzerland 10–6 ~~Italy~~
    - ~~Finland~~ 4–7 Scotland
      - Standings: Switzerland 6 wins, Denmark, Russia 5, Scotland, Sweden, Norway, Germany 4, Finland 2, Italy 1, England 0.

==== Football (soccer) ====
- CECAFA Cup in Kenya:
  - Quarterfinals:
    - **Tanzania** 4–0 Eritrea
    - **Rwanda** 4–1 Zimbabwe
- UEFA Champions League group stage, Matchday 6: (teams in **bold** advance to the round of 16, teams in italics advance to the round of 32 in Europa League, teams in ~~strike~~ are eliminated)
  - Group A:
    - Juventus (Italy) 1–4 (Germany) **Bayern Munich**
    - ~~Maccabi Haifa~~ (Israel) 0–1 (France) **Bordeaux**
      - Final standings: Bordeaux 16 points, Bayern Munich 10, Juventus 8, Maccabi Haifa 0.
      - Maccabi Haifa become the first team in the Champions League history to lose all matches in the group stage and fail to score a goal.
  - Group B:
    - Wolfsburg (Germany) 1–3 (England) **Manchester United**
    - ~~Beşiktaş~~ (Turkey) 1–2 (Russia) **CSKA Moscow**
      - Final standings: Manchester United 13 points, CSKA Moscow 10, Wolfsburg 7, Beşiktaş 4.
  - Group C:
    - ~~Zürich~~ (Switzerland) 1–1 (Italy) **Milan**
    - Marseille (France) 1–3 (Spain) **Real Madrid**
      - Final standings: Real Madrid 13 points, Milan 9, Marseille 7, Zürich 4.
  - Group D:
    - **Chelsea** (England) 2–2 (Cyprus) ~~APOEL~~
    - Atlético Madrid (Spain) 0–3 (Portugal) **Porto**
      - Final standings: Chelsea 14 points, Porto 12, Atlético Madrid, APOEL 3.

==== Snooker ====
- Pukka Pies UK Championship in Telford, England:
  - Round of 16:
    - Mark Selby (ENG) (7) def. Stephen Hendry (SCO) (10) 9–5
    - John Higgins (SCO) (2) def. Neil Robertson (AUS) (9) 9–8
    - Stephen Maguire (SCO) (4) def. Stuart Bingham (ENG) 9–3
    - Liang Wenbo (CHN) def. Mark King (SCO) (16) 9–2
    - Ding Junhui (CHN) (13) def. Shaun Murphy (ENG) (1) 9–3
    - Ronnie O'Sullivan (ENG) (3) def. Peter Ebdon (ENG) (14) 9–3
    - Stephen Maguire (SCO) (4) def. Stuart Bingham (ENG) 9–3
    - Peter Lines (ENG) def. Mark Williams (WAL) (15) 9–8
    - Ali Carter (ENG) (5) def. Stephen Lee (ENG) 9–5

=== December 7, 2009 (Monday) ===
==== American football ====
- NFL Monday Night Football, Week 13:
  - Green Bay Packers 27, Baltimore Ravens 14

==== Baseball ====
- Hall of Fame balloting:
  - The Veterans Committee announces the results of its biennial elections for non-playing personnel. Whitey Herzog, former manager of four teams, most notably the St. Louis Cardinals, and former National League umpire Doug Harvey are elected from the ballot for managers and umpires. No candidate is elected from the executives' ballot. (Hall of Fame press release)

==== Cricket ====
- West Indies in Australia:
  - 2nd Test in Adelaide, day 4:
    - West Indies 451 & 284/8 (93.0 ov, Chris Gayle 155*); Australia 439. West Indies led by 296 runs with 2 wickets remaining.
- ICC Intercontinental Shield:
  - Namibia v United Arab Emirates in Windhoek, day 3:
    - Namibia 369 & 134/3 (66.0 ov); United Arab Emirates 297. Namibia led by 206 runs with 7 wickets remaining.

==== Curling ====
- European Championships in Aberdeen, Scotland:
  - Women, draw 4:
    - England 3–10 Sweden
    - Scotland 3–6 Russia
    - Germany 10–5 Norway
    - Finland 4–6 Switzerland
    - Denmark 8–2 Italy
      - Standings: Russia 4 wins, Denmark, Sweden, Switzerland 3, Germany, Scotland, Norway 2, Italy 1, England, Finland 0.
  - Men, draw 5:
    - Norway 9–7 Finland
    - France 7–5 Switzerland
    - Denmark 3–8 Scotland
    - Italy 2–8 Sweden
    - Czech Republic 4–7 Germany
      - Standings: Norway 5 wins, France, Scotland, Sweden 4, Czech Republic, Finland, Germany, Switzerland 2, Denmark, Italy 0.
  - Women, draw 5:
    - Scotland 5–11 Switzerland
    - Sweden 7–5 Italy
    - England 3–10 Finland
    - Germany 4–7 Denmark
    - Norway 5–9 Russia
      - Standings: Russia 5 wins, Denmark, Sweden, Switzerland 4, Germany, Scotland, Norway 2, Finland, Italy 1, England 0.

==== Football (soccer) ====
- CECAFA Cup in Kenya:
  - Quarterfinals:
    - **Uganda** 1–0 Kenya
    - Zambia 0–0 (3–4 pen.) **Zanzibar**

==== Handball ====
- World Women's Championship in China: (teams in **bold** advance to the Main Round)
  - Group A:
    - Germany 32–30 Brazil
    - Denmark 37–24 Congo
    - France 23–21 Sweden
      - Standings: Denmark 6 points, Germany, Sweden 4, Brazil, France 2, Congo 0.
  - Group B:
    - Ukraine 41–13 Thailand
    - Angola 21–28 Austria
    - Russia 48–8 Australia
      - Standings: Russia, Austria 6 points, Angola 4, Ukraine 2, Australia, Thailand 0.
  - Group C:
    - Japan 31–31 Tunisia
    - **Norway** 44–15 Chile
    - **Romania** 31–25 Hungary
      - Standings: Norway, Romania 6 points, Hungary 4, Tunisia, Japan 1, Chile 0.
  - Group D:
    - Ivory Coast 19–19 Argentina
    - **South Korea** 33–25 China
    - **Spain** 30–12 Kazakhstan
      - Standings: Spain, Korea 6 points, China 4, Côte d'Ivoire, Argentina 1, Kazakhstan 0.

==== Ice hockey ====
- NHL news:
  - New Jersey Devils goaltender Martin Brodeur collects his 103rd career shutout in the Devils' 3–0 win over the Buffalo Sabres, tying the league record of Terry Sawchuk. (AP via ESPN)

==== Snooker ====
- Pukka Pies UK Championship in Telford, England:
  - Round of 32:
    - Ronnie O'Sullivan (ENG) (3) def. Matthew Stevens (WAL) 9–3
    - Ali Carter (ENG) (5) def. Rory McLeod (ENG) 9–7
    - Ding Junhui (CHN) (13) def. Mike Dunn (ENG) 9–5
    - Peter Lines (ENG) def. Marco Fu (HKG) (8) 9–3

=== December 6, 2009 (Sunday) ===
==== Alpine skiing ====
- Men's World Cup in Beaver Creek, United States:
  - Giant slalom: (gold) Carlo Janka (SUI) (silver) Benjamin Raich (AUT) (bronze) Aksel Lund Svindal (NOR)
    - Overall standings after 7 of 34 races: (1) Janka 460 points (2) Didier Cuche (SUI) 355 (3) Raich 281
- Women's World Cup in Lake Louise, Canada:
  - Super-G: (gold) Elisabeth Görgl (AUT) (silver) Lindsey Vonn (USA) (bronze) Ingrid Jacquemod (FRA)
    - Overall standings after 7 of 33 races: (1) Vonn 389 points (2) Maria Riesch (GER) 361 (3) Kathrin Zettel (AUT) 220

==== American football ====
- NFL Week 13 (teams in **bold** have clinched division title):
  - Philadelphia Eagles 34, Atlanta Falcons 7
    - Michael Vick runs for a touchdown and throws for another in his return to Atlanta, where he played before his imprisonment.
  - Chicago Bears 17, St. Louis Rams 9
  - Cincinnati Bengals 23, Detroit Lions 13
  - **Indianapolis Colts** 27, Tennessee Titans 17
    - The Colts tie an NFL record with their 21st consecutive regular-season win.
  - Jacksonville Jaguars 23, Houston Texans 18
  - Oakland Raiders 27, Pittsburgh Steelers 24
  - Denver Broncos 44, Kansas City Chiefs 13
  - Miami Dolphins 22, New England Patriots 21
  - Carolina Panthers 16, Tampa Bay Buccaneers 6
  - **New Orleans Saints** 33, Washington Redskins 30 (OT)
    - The Saints remain unbeaten and clinch the NFC South title. Drew Brees becomes the fifth quarterback this season to pass for at least 400 yards in a game.
  - San Diego Chargers 30, Cleveland Browns 23
  - New York Giants 31, Dallas Cowboys 24
  - Seattle Seahawks 20, San Francisco 49ers 17
  - Sunday Night Football: Arizona Cardinals 30, Minnesota Vikings 17
- NCAA Division I FBS:
  - BCS bowl game matchups (unbeaten teams in **bold**):
    - BCS National Championship Game, January 7 in Pasadena, California: **Texas** vs. **Alabama**
    - Rose Bowl, January 1 in Pasadena, California: Ohio State vs. Oregon
    - Sugar Bowl, January 1 in New Orleans: **Cincinnati** vs. Florida
    - Fiesta Bowl, January 4 in Glendale, Arizona: **Boise State** vs. **TCU**
      - This will be the first time ever that two unbeaten teams play in a BCS game other than the National Championship Game, and also the first time ever that two teams from the non-automatic qualifying conferences earn BCS berths in the same season.
    - Orange Bowl, January 5 in Miami Gardens, Florida: Iowa vs. Georgia Tech

==== Auto racing ====
- V8 Supercars:
  - Telstra 500 in Sydney, New South Wales

==== Badminton ====
- BWF Super Series:
  - Super Series Masters Finals in Johor Bahru, Malaysia:
    - Men's singles: Lee Chong Wei (MAS)
    - Women's singles: Wong Mew Choo (MAS)
    - Men's doubles: Jung Jae Sung/Lee Yong Dae (KOR)
    - Women's doubles: Wong Pei Tty/Chin Eei Hui (MAS)
    - Mixed doubles: Joachim Fischer Nielsen/Christinna Pedersen (DEN)

==== Biathlon ====
- World Cup 1 in Östersund, Sweden:
  - Men's 4 x 7.5 km relay: (gold) France (Vincent Jay, Vincent Defrasne, Simon Fourcade, Martin Fourcade) 1:15:10.3 (1 penalty loops + 7 extra shots) (silver) Norway (Emil Hegle Svendsen, Alexander Os, Lars Berger, Ole Einar Bjørndalen 1:15:24.0 (3+11) (bronze) Austria (Daniel Mesotitsch, Simon Eder, Dominik Landertinger, Christoph Sumann) 1:15:28.5 (1+8)
  - Women's 4 x 6 km relay: (gold) Germany (Martina Beck, Andrea Henkel, Simone Hauswald, Kati Wilhelm) 1:10:52.5 (0 penalty loops + 9 extra shots) (silver) Russia (Svetlana Sleptsova, Anna Boulygina, Olga Zaitseva, Olga Medvedtseva) 1:11:10.9 (0+9) (bronze) France (Marie-Laure Brunet, Sylvie Becaert, Marie Dorin, Sandrine Bailly) 1:12:17.7 (0+10)

==== Bobsleigh ====
- World Cup in Cesana, Italy:
  - Four-man: (gold) United States (Steven Holcomb, Justin Olsen, Steve Mesler, Curtis Tomasevicz) 1:51.22 (silver) Switzerland (Ivo Rüegg, Roman Handschin, Cedric Grand, Patrick Bloechliger) 1:51.63 (bronze) Canada (Lyndon Rush, Chris le Bihan, Dan Humphries, Lascelles Brown) 1:51.67
    - Standings (after 3 of 8 races): (1) Holcomb 618 points (2) Rush 593 (3) Jānis Miņins (LAT) 586

==== Cricket ====
- Sri Lanka in India:
  - 3rd Test in Mumbai, day 5:
    - Sri Lanka 393 and 309 (Kumar Sangakkara 137); India 726/9d. **India win by an innings and 24 runs, win the 3-match series 2–0**.
      - The win takes India to the top of the ICC Test Championship for the first time.
- Pakistan in New Zealand:
  - 2nd Test in Wellington, day 4:
    - Pakistan 264 and 239; New Zealand 99 and 263. **Pakistan win by 141 runs. 3-match series level 1–1**.
- West Indies in Australia:
  - 2nd Test in Adelaide, day 3:
    - West Indies 451 and 0 for 23; Australia 439. Australia led by 35 runs with 10 wickets remaining.
- ICC Intercontinental Shield:
  - Namibia v United Arab Emirates in Windhoek, day 2:
    - Namibia 369; United Arab Emirates 185/3 (58.0 ov). United Arab Emirates trail by 184 runs with 7 wickets remaining in the 1st innings.

==== Cross-country skiing ====
- World Cup in Düsseldorf, Germany:
  - Women's team sprint freestyle: (gold) Italy (Magda Genuin, Arianna Follis) (silver) Sweden (Ida Ingemarsdotter, Hanna Falk) (bronze) Norway (Celine Brun-Lie, Maiken Caspersen Falla)
  - Men's team sprint freestyle: (gold) Russia (Nikolay Morilov, Alexey Petukhov) (silver) Norway (Eirik Brandsdal, Anders Gløersen) (bronze) Sweden (Robin Bryntesson, Björn Lind)

==== Curling ====
- European Championships in Aberdeen, Scotland: (unbeaten teams in **bold**)
  - Men, draw 3:
    - Scotland 2–3 Czech Republic
    - Denmark 5–7 Sweden
    - France 11–6 Finland
    - Switzerland 10–3 Germany
    - **Norway** 8–6 Italy
  - Women, draw 3:
    - Finland 3–8 Norway
    - England 7–11 Denmark
    - Sweden 7–6 Switzerland
    - Italy 5–11 **Russia**
    - Scotland 5–2 Germany
      - Standings: Russia 3 wins, Denmark, Scotland, Sweden, Switzerland, Norway 2, Italy, Germany 1, England, Finland 0.
  - Men, draw 4:
    - Denmark 6–7 France
    - **Norway** 10–2 Germany
    - Italy 6–7 Czech Republic
    - Scotland 15–1 Finland
    - Sweden 6–5 Switzerland
      - Standings: Norway 4 wins, France, Scotland, Sweden 3, Czech Republic, Finland, Switzerland 2, Germany 1, Denmark, Italy 0.

==== Field hockey ====
- Men's Champions Trophy in Melbourne, Australia:
  - Fifth place match: England 2–5 **Spain**
  - Third place match: Netherlands 2–4 (bronze) **South Korea**
  - Final: (gold) **Australia** 5–3 (silver) Germany
    - The Kookaburras rallied from a 3–1 half-time deficit to win the Trophy for a record 10th time.

==== Figure skating ====
- ISU Grand Prix:
  - Grand Prix Final in Tokyo, Japan:
    - Junior Ice Dance: (gold) Ksenia Monko/Kirill Khaliavin (RUS) 141.21 (silver) Elena Ilinykh/Nikita Katsalapov (RUS) 139.36 (bronze) Maia Shibutani/Alex Shibutani (USA) 138.75
    - Junior Ladies: (gold) Kanako Murakami (JPN) 160.53 (silver) Polina Shelepen (RUS) 159.29 (bronze) Christina Gao (USA) 151.47

==== Football (soccer) ====
- (Brazil) Campeonato Brasileiro Série A: (teams in **bold** qualify for 2010 Copa Libertadores)
  - Final standings: **Flamengo** 67 points, **Internacional**, **São Paulo** 65, **Cruzeiro**, Palmeiras 62.
    - Flamengo win their sixth national championship and the first since 1992.
- (South Korea) K-League Championship Final, second leg: (first leg score in parentheses)
  - **Jeonbuk Hyundai Motors** 3–1 (0–0) Seongnam Ilhwa Chunma. Jeonbuk Hyundai Motors win 3–1 on aggregate.
    - Joenbuk win their first ever championship.

==== Golf ====
- Off-season men's events:
  - Chevron World Challenge in Thousand Oaks, California
    - Winner: Jim Furyk

==== Handball ====
- World Women's Championship in China:
  - Group A:
    - Congo 23–36 Germany
    - Brazil 23–26 Sweden
    - Denmark 24–16 France
  - Group B:
    - Australia 10–45 Austria
    - Ukraine 20–28 Angola
    - Thailand 8–45 Russia
  - Group C:
    - Chile 14–48 Hungary
    - Tunisia 25–36 Norway
    - Japan 28–37 Romania
  - Group D:
    - Ivory Coast 26–35 South Korea
    - Argentina 15–33 Spain
    - Kazakhstan 13–25 China

==== Luge ====
- World Cup in Altenberg, Germany:
  - Women: (gold) Tatjana Hüfner (GER) 1:47.555 (silver) Natalie Geisenberger (GER) 1:47.744 (bronze) Anke Wischnewski (GER) 1:47.994
    - World Cup standings (after three of eight events): (1) Hüfner 285 points (2) Geisenberger 270 (3) Wischnewski 210
  - Teams: (gold) Germany (Felix Loch, Tatjana Hüfner, Tobias Wendl/Tobias Arlt) 2:25.742 (silver) United States (Tony Benshoof, Erin Hamlin, Christian Niccum/Dan Joye) 2:26.680 (bronze) Canada (Samuel Edney, Alex Gough, Chris Moffat/Mike Moffat) 2:26.941
    - World Cup standings (after two of five events): (1) Canada 170 points (2) United States 145 (3) Austria 140

==== Nordic combined ====
- World Cup in Lillehammer, Norway:
  - HS138 / 10 km: (gold) Tino Edelmann (GER) (silver) Anssi Koivuranta (FIN) (bronze) Jason Lamy Chappuis (FRA)
    - Standings after 4 of 19 events: (1) Lamy Chappuis 305 points (2) Edelmann 254 (3) Eric Frenzel (GER) 225

==== Ski jumping ====
- World Cup in Lillehammer, Norway:
  - HS 138: (gold) Simon Ammann (SUI) 277.1 points (146.0 (hill record)/129.5 meters) (silver) Harri Olli (FIN) 267.6 (142.0/126.0) (bronze) Emmanuel Chedal (FRA) 265.0 (138.5/127.5)
    - Overall World Cup standings (after 3 of 24 events): (1) Gregor Schlierenzauer (AUT) 162 pts (2) Ammann 144 (3) Pascal Bodmer (GER) 143

==== Snooker ====
- Pukka Pies UK Championship in Telford, England:
  - Round of 32:
    - Mark Selby (ENG) (7) def. Jamie Cope (ENG) 9–8
    - Liang Wenbo (CHN) def. Ryan Day (WAL) (8) 9–3
    - Neil Robertson (AUS) (9) def. Tom Ford 9–3
    - Stuart Bingham (ENG) def. Joe Perry (ENG) (12) 9–4
    - John Higgins (SCO) (2) def. Ricky Walden (ENG) 9–7
    - Stephen Hendry (SCO) (10) def. Steve Davis (ENG) 9–6
    - Stephen Lee (ENG) def. Mark Allen (NIR) (11) 9–8
    - Peter Ebdon (ENG) (14) def. Judd Trump (ENG) 9–4

==== Snowboarding ====
- World Cup in Limone Piemonte, Italy:
  - Men's parallel slalom: Cancelled
  - Women's parallel slalom: Cancelled

==== Speed skating ====
- World Cup 4 in Calgary, Canada:
  - 1000 m women: (gold) Christine Nesbitt (CAN) 1:14.03 (silver) Annette Gerritsen (NED) 1:14.48 (bronze) Monique Angermüller (GER) 1:14.68
  - 1000 m men: (gold) Shani Davis (USA) 1:06.91 (silver) Lee Kyou-hyuk (KOR) 1:07.61 (bronze) Denny Morrison (CAN) 1:07.77
  - Team pursuit women: (gold) Canada (Kristina Groves, Christine Nesbitt, Brittany Schussler) 2:55.79 (silver) Japan (Masako Hozumi, Maki Tabata, Shiho Ishizawa) 2:59.79 (bronze) Germany (Isabell Ost, Stephanie Beckert, Katrin Mattscherodt) 3:00.25
  - Team pursuit men: (gold) Netherlands (Sven Kramer, Carl Verheijen, Jan Blokhuijsen) 3:38.05 (silver) Canada (Denny Morrison, Lucas Makowsky, Mathieu Giroux) 3:39.17 (bronze) Norway (Håvard Bøkko, Sverre Lunde Pedersen, Fredrik van der Horst) 3:41.59

==== Tennis ====
- Davis Cup Final in Barcelona, day 3:
  - **Spain** 5–0 Czech Republic
    - Rafael Nadal (ESP) def. Jan Hájek (CZE) 6–3, 6–4
    - David Ferrer (ESP) def. Lukáš Dlouhý (CZE) 6–4, 6–2

=== December 5, 2009 (Saturday) ===
==== Alpine skiing ====
- Men's World Cup in Beaver Creek, United States:
  - Downhill: (gold) Carlo Janka (SUI) 1:43.49 (silver) Didier Cuche (SUI) 1:43.51 (bronze) Aksel Lund Svindal (NOR) 1:43.53
    - Overall standings (after 6 of 34 races): (1) Janka 360 points (2) Cuche 319 (3) Benjamin Raich (AUT) 201
- Women's World Cup in Lake Louise, Canada:
  - Downhill: (gold) Lindsey Vonn (USA) 1:50.06 (silver) Maria Riesch (GER) 1:50.41 (bronze) Emily Brydon (CAN) 1:50.76
    - Overall standings (after 6 of 33 races): (1) Riesch 316 points (2) Vonn 309 (3) Kathrin Zettel (AUT) 220

==== American football ====
- NCAA Division I FBS (unbeaten teams in **bold**):
  - Conference championship games (BCS rankings in parentheses):
    - SEC Championship Game in Atlanta: (2) **Alabama** 32, (1) Florida 13
      - The Crimson Tide book a spot in the National Championship Game, with Mark Ingram II running for three touchdowns. Florida's consolation prize is likely to be the Sugar Bowl.
    - Big 12 Championship Game in Arlington, Texas: (3) **Texas** 13, (22) Nebraska 12
      - Hunter Lawrence's 46-yard field goal with :01 left in the game seals the Big 12 title for the Longhorns, and will likely earn them a berth in the National Championship Game.
    - ACC Championship Game in Tampa, Florida: (10) Georgia Tech 39, Clemson 34
      - Jonathan Dwyer's 15-yard touchdown run with 1:20 left gives the Yellow Jackets their first outright conference title since 1990 and a trip to the Orange Bowl.
    - Conference USA Championship in Greenville, North Carolina: East Carolina 38, (21) Houston 32
  - Other BCS Top 10 games:
    - (5) **Cincinnati** 45, (15) Pittsburgh 44
      - After the Panthers score a touchdown with 1:36 left for a 44–38 lead, the snap is bobbled on the extra point attempt, allowing Tony Pike to lead a 4-play 61-yard drive capped by a 29-yard touchdown pass to Armon Binns. With the win, the Bearcats earn the Big East automatic BCS bowl berth.
    - (6) **Boise State** 42, New Mexico State 7
      - The Broncos complete their second consecutive unbeaten regular season and third in the last four years, but are not assured of a BCS bowl berth, because TCU is higher in the BCS rankings, and only one "non-BCS conferences" champion can earn an automatic BCS bowl berth.
  - Played earlier this week: (7) Oregon
  - Regular season completed: (4) **TCU**, (8) Ohio State, (9) Iowa
  - Other games:
    - Arizona 21, (18) USC 17
    - Washington 42, (19) California 10
- NCAA Division I FCS:
  - Playoffs, quarterfinals (unbeaten team in **bold**; seeds in parentheses):
    - (1) **Montana** 51, Stephen F. Austin 0
    - Appalachian State 35, (4) Richmond 31
    - (2) Villanova 46, New Hampshire 7
    - William & Mary 24, (3) Southern Illinois 3
  - Other games:
    - Gridiron Classic in Indianapolis: Butler 28, Central Connecticut State 23

==== Biathlon ====
- World Cup 1 in Östersund, Sweden:
  - Women's 7.5 km sprint: (gold) Tora Berger (NOR) 21:21.5 (0 penalties) (silver) Olga Medvedtseva (RUS) 21:28.3 (0) (bronze) Kaisa Mäkäräinen (FIN) 21:31.5 (0)
    - Overall World Cup standings (after two of 25 events): (1) Helena Jonsson (SWE) 103 points (2) Berger 87 (3) Anna Carin Olofsson-Zidek (SWE) & Medvedtseva 86
  - Men's 10 km sprint: (gold) Ole Einar Bjørndalen (NOR) 23:30.1 (0 penalties) (silver) Emil Hegle Svendsen (NOR) 23:55.2 (1) (bronze) Tim Burke (USA) 24:07.3 (0)
    - Overall World Cup standings (after two of 25 events): (1) Svendsen 114 points (2) Burke 102 (3) Christoph Sumann (AUT) 84

==== Bobsleigh ====
- World Cup in Cesana, Italy:
  - Two-man: (gold) Beat Hefti/Thomas Lamparter (SUI) 1:52.37 (silver) Ivo Rüegg/Cedric Grand (SUI) 1:52.59 (bronze) Steven Holcomb/Curtis Tomasevicz (USA) 1:52.87
    - Standings (after 3 of 8 races): (1) Rüegg 610 points (2) Holcomb 602 (3) Alexandr Zubkov (RUS) 552
  - Two-woman: (gold) Shauna Rohbock/Michelle Rzepka (USA) 1:56.09 (silver) Cathleen Martini/Romy Logsch (GER) 1:56.43 (bronze) Sandra Kiriasis/Berit Wiacker (GER) 1:56.45
    - Standings (after 3 of 8 races): (1) Martini 660 points (2) Kiriasis 620 (3) Rohbock 561

==== Cricket ====
- Sri Lanka in India:
  - 3rd Test in Mumbai, day 4:
    - Sri Lanka 393 & 274/6 (93.0 ov, Kumar Sangakkara 133*); India 726/9d. Sri Lanka trail by 59 runs with 4 wickets remaining.
- Pakistan in New Zealand:
  - 2nd Test in Wellington, day 3:
    - Pakistan 264 & 239; New Zealand 99 & 70/3 (33.0 ov). New Zealand require another 335 runs with 7 wickets remaining.
- West Indies in Australia:
  - 2nd Test in Adelaide, day 2:
    - West Indies 451; Australia 174/0 (48.0 ov). Australia trail by 277 runs with 10 wickets remaining in the 1st innings.
- ICC Intercontinental Shield:
  - Namibia v United Arab Emirates in Windhoek, day 1:
    - Namibia 255/5 (96.0 ov)

==== Cross-country skiing ====
- World Cup in Düsseldorf, Germany:
  - Women's sprint freestyle: (gold) Hanna Falk (SWE) (silver) Natalia Korosteleva (RUS) (bronze) Vesna Fabjan (SLO)
  - Men's sprint freestyle: (gold) Alexey Petukhov (RUS) (silver) Anders Gløersen (NOR) (bronze) Eirik Brandsdal (NOR)

==== Curling ====
- European Championships in Aberdeen, Scotland: (unbeaten teams in **bold**)
  - Men, draw 1:
    - Germany 8–5 Denmark (9 ends)
    - Italy 5–6 France
    - Norway 8–7 Switzerland (11 ends)
    - Sweden 2–3 Scotland
    - Finland 9–8 Czech Republic (11 ends)
  - Women, draw 1:
    - Russia 8–5 England
    - Germany 7–4 Sweden (9 ends)
    - Scotland 6–11 Italy (9 ends)
    - Denmark 9–4 Finland (9 ends)
    - Switzerland 6–4 Norway (9 ends)
  - Men, draw 2:
    - **Finland** 9–7 Italy
    - Switzerland 9–6 Czech Republic
    - Germany 4–10 Sweden (8 ends)
    - **Norway** 8–5 Denmark (9 ends)
    - France 2–5 **Scotland**
  - Women, draw 2:
    - **Switzerland** 10–2 Germany (7 ends)
    - Italy 6–7 Norway (11 ends)
    - **Russia** 10–1 Denmark (6 ends)
    - Scotland 7–4 England (9 ends)
    - Sweden 9–2 Finland (8 ends)

==== Field hockey ====
- Men's Champions Trophy in Melbourne, Australia: (teams in **bold** advance to the final)
  - England 3–2 South Korea
  - **Australia** 10–3 Spain
  - Netherlands 4–3 **Germany**
    - Final standings: Australia 12 points, Germany, Netherlands 9, Korea 7, England 4, Spain 2.

==== Figure skating ====
- ISU Grand Prix:
  - Grand Prix Final in Tokyo, Japan:
    - Junior Ice Dance – Original Dance: (1) Ksenia Monko/Kirill Khaliavin (RUS) 55.70 (2) Maia Shibutani/Alex Shibutani (USA) 55.21 (3) Elena Ilinykh/Nikita Katsalapov (RUS) 54.35
    - Junior Ladies – Short Program: (1) Polina Shelepen (RUS) 59.54 (2) Kanako Murakami (JPN) 59.52 (3) Ksenia Makarova (RUS) 55.38
    - Senior Pairs: (gold) Shen Xue/Zhao Hongbo (CHN) 214.25 (WR) (silver) Pang Qing/Tong Jian (CHN) 201.86 (bronze) Aliona Savchenko/Robin Szolkowy (GER) 200.38
      - Shen/Zhao win the title for the sixth time and set world records for both Free Skating (138.89) and Total, to add to the world best mark in Short Program they set on Thursday.
    - Senior Men: (gold) Evan Lysacek (USA) 249.45 (silver) Nobunari Oda (JPN) 243.36 (bronze) Johnny Weir (USA) 237.35
    - Senior Ladies: (gold) Kim Yuna (KOR) 188.86 (silver) Miki Ando (JPN) 185.94 (bronze) Akiko Suzuki (JPN) 174.00

==== Football (soccer) ====
- CECAFA Cup in Kenya: (teams in **bold** advance to the quarterfinals)
  - Group B:
    - **Eritrea** 3–1 Somalia
    - **Zimbabwe** 0–1 **Rwanda**
      - Final standings: Rwanda 9 points, Eritrea, Zimbabwe 4, Somalia 0.
- CAF Confederation Cup Finals, second leg: (first leg score in parentheses)
  - Stade Malien (Mali) 2–0 (0–2) (Algeria) ES Sétif. 2–2 on aggregate, Stade Malien win 3–2 in penalty shootout.
- OFC Champions League Group stage, Matchday 3:
  - Group B: PRK Hekari United (Papua New Guinea) 2–1 (Solomon Islands) Marist FC
    - Standings: Tafea FC 7 points, Lautoka F.C. 6, Hekari United 4, Marist 0.
- (Japan) J.League:
  - Final standings: Kashima Antlers 66 points, Kawasaki Frontale 64, Gamba Osaka 60. Top three teams qualify for AFC Champions League Group stage.
- (Ecuador) Ecuadorian Championship playoff, second leg: (first leg score in parentheses)
  - **Deportivo Quito** 3–2 (1–1) Deportivo Cuenca. Deportivo Quito win 4–3 on aggregate.
    - Deportivo win the title for the second straight year and fourth time overall.
- (Chile) Primera División Chilena Clausura playoff final, first leg:
  - Colo-Colo 2–2 Universidad Católica

==== Handball ====
- World Women's Championship in China:
  - Group A:
    - France 20–22 Brazil
    - Sweden 28–19 Congo
    - Germany 26–27 Denmark
  - Group B:
    - Angola 39–9 Australia
    - Austria 52–11 Thailand
    - Russia 27–18 Ukraine
  - Group C:
    - Romania 51–17 Chile
    - Norway 34–19 Japan
    - Hungary 33–25 Tunisia
  - Group D:
    - South Korea 39–21 Kazakhstan
    - Spain 29–18 Ivory Coast
    - China 26–15 Argentina

==== Luge ====
- World Cup in Altenberg, Germany:
  - Men: (gold) Felix Loch (GER) 1:48.911 (silver) Armin Zoggeler (ITA) 1:48.969 (bronze) Albert Demtschenko (RUS) 1:49.049
    - World Cup standings (after three of eight events): (1) Zöggeler 285 points (2) Loch 220 (3) David Möller (GER) 191
  - Doubles: (gold) André Florschütz/Torsten Wustlich (GER) 1:24.460 (silver) Peter Penz/Georg Fischler (AUT) 1:24.479 (bronze) Christian Oberstolz/Patrick Gruber (ITA) 1:24.565
    - World Cup standings (after three of eight events): (1) Florschütz/Wustlich 270 points (2) Patric Leitner/Alexander Resch (GER) 250 (3) Oberstolz/Gruber 200

==== Nordic combined ====
- World Cup in Lillehammer, Norway:
  - HS138 / 10 km: (gold) Jason Lamy Chappuis (FRA) (silver) Petter Tande (NOR) (bronze) Eric Frenzel (GER)
    - Standings after 3 of 19 events: (1) Lamy Chappuis 245 points (2) Hannu Manninen (FIN), Tande & Frenzel 180

==== Rugby union ====
- End of year tests:
  - Week 6:
    - Barbarians 25–18 New Zealand in London
- IRB Sevens World Series:
  - Dubai Sevens in Dubai:
    - Cup Final: New Zealand 24–12 Samoa

==== Speed skating ====
- World Cup 4 in Calgary, Canada:
  - 500 m women: (gold) Jenny Wolf (GER) 37.21 (silver) Wang Beixing (CHN) 37.60 (bronze) Lee Sang-hwa (KOR) 37.64
  - 500 m men: (gold) Lee Kyou-hyuk (KOR) 34.28 (silver) Mika Poutala (FIN) 34.38 (bronze) Tucker Fredricks (USA) 34.50
  - 1500 m women: (gold) Kristina Groves (CAN) 1:54.35 (silver) Christine Nesbitt (CAN) 1:54.43 (bronze) Elma de Vries (NED) 1:54.55
  - 5000 m men: (gold) Sven Kramer (NED) 6:11.11 (silver) Ivan Skobrev (RUS) 1:54.43 (bronze) Bob de Jong (NED) 6:13.80

==== Ski jumping ====
- World Cup in Lillehammer, Norway:
  - HS 138: (gold) Gregor Schlierenzauer (AUT) 268.9 pts (125.5/141.0 metres) (silver) Thomas Morgenstern (AUT) 265.4 (130.0/134.0) (bronze) Adam Małysz (POL) 259.8 (127.5/134.5)
    - Overall World Cup standings (after two of 24 events): (1) Bjørn Einar Romøren (NOR) 114 pts (2) Schlierenzauer 112 (3) Pascal Bodmer (GER) 98

==== Snooker ====
- Pukka Pies UK Championship in Telford, England:
  - Round of 32:
    - Shaun Murphy (ENG) (1) def. Gerard Greene (NIR) 9–5
    - Stephen Maguire (SCO) (4) def. Michael Holt (ENG) 9–6
    - Mark Williams (WAL) (15) def. Graeme Dott (SCO) 9–2
    - Anthony Hamilton (ENG) (16) def. Mark King (ENG) 9–2

==== Tennis ====
- Davis Cup Final in Barcelona, day 2:
  - **Spain** 3–0 Czech Republic
    - Feliciano López/Fernando Verdasco def. Tomáš Berdych/Radek Štěpánek 7–6, 7–5, 6–2
      - Spain win the Cup for the fourth time and becomes the first nation to successfully defend the title since 1998.

=== December 4, 2009 (Friday) ===
==== Alpine skiing ====
- Men's World Cup in Beaver Creek, United States:
  - Super combined: (gold) Carlo Janka (SUI) 2:32.26 (silver) Didier Defago (SUI) 2:32.69 (bronze) Natko Zrnčić-Dim (CRO) 2:32.75
    - Overall standings (after 5 of 34 races): (1) Janka 260 points (2) Didier Cuche (SUI) 239 (3) Benjamin Raich (AUT) 201
- Women's World Cup in Lake Louise, Canada:
  - Downhill: (gold) Lindsey Vonn (USA) 1:26.13 (silver) Emily Brydon (CAN) 1:26.65 (bronze) Maria Riesch (GER) 1:26.93
    - Overall standings (after 5 of 33 races): (1) Riesch 236 points (2) Kathrin Zettel (AUT) 220 (3) Vonn 209

==== American football ====
- NCAA Division I FBS:
  - MAC Championship Game in Detroit:
    - Central Michigan 20, Ohio 10
      - The Chippewas win the MAC crown for the third time in four years, with quarterback Dan LeFevour passing for two touchdowns to set a new FBS record for combined TDs passing, running, and receiving in a career with 148, surpassing the previous record of Colt Brennan of Hawaiʻi and Graham Harrell of Texas Tech.

==== Basketball ====
- NBA:
  - The New Jersey Nets end their 18-game losing streak from the start of the season with a 97–91 win over the Charlotte Bobcats, in the first game of general manager Kiki Vandeweghe as head coach.

==== Cricket ====
- Sri Lanka in India:
  - 3rd Test in Mumbai, day 3:
    - Sri Lanka 393 & 11/0 (3.0 ov); India 726/9d (Virender Sehwag 293, MS Dhoni 100*). Sri Lanka trail by 322 runs with 10 wickets remaining.
- Pakistan in New Zealand:
  - 2nd Test in Wellington, day 2:
    - Pakistan 264 & 64/2 (23.0 ov); New Zealand 99. Pakistan led by 229 runs with 8 wickets remaining.
- West Indies in Australia:
  - 2nd Test in Adelaide, day 1:
    - West Indies 336/6 (85.0 ov, Dwayne Bravo 104)
- England in South Africa:
  - 5th ODI in Durban:
    - **Match abandoned without a ball bowled. England win the 5-match series 2–1**.

==== Figure skating ====
- ISU Grand Prix:
  - Grand Prix Final in Tokyo, Japan:
    - Junior Men: (gold) Yuzuru Hanyu (JPN) 206.77 (silver) Song Nan (CHN) 204.99 (bronze) Ross Miner (USA) 196.09
    - Junior Pairs: (gold) Sui Wenjing/Han Cong (CHN) 160.45 (silver) Narumi Takahashi/Mervin Tran (JPN) 145.80 (bronze) Zhang Yue/Wang Lei 137.19
    - Senior Men – Short Program: (1) Daisuke Takahashi (JPN) 89.95 (2) Evan Lysacek (USA) 89.85 (3) Nobunari Oda (JPN) 87.65
    - Senior Ladies – Short Program: (1) Miki Ando (JPN) 66.20 (2) Kim Yuna (KOR) 65.64 (3) Alena Leonova (RUS) 61.60
    - Senior Ice Dance: (gold) Meryl Davis/Charlie White (USA) 169.44 (silver) Tessa Virtue/Scott Moir (CAN) 168.22 (bronze) Nathalie Péchalat/Fabian Bourzat (FRA) 147.62

==== Football (soccer) ====
- 2010 FIFA World Cup Draw in Cape Town:
  - Group A: South Africa Mexico Uruguay France
    - South Africa will play against Mexico in the opening match in Johannesburg on June 11.
  - Group B: Argentina Nigeria South Korea Greece
  - Group C: England United States Algeria Slovenia
  - Group D: Germany Australia Serbia Ghana
  - Group E: Netherlands Denmark Japan Cameroon
  - Group F: Italy Paraguay New Zealand Slovakia
  - Group G: Brazil North Korea Ivory Coast Portugal
  - Group H: Spain Switzerland Honduras Chile
- CECAFA Cup in Kenya: (teams in **bold** advance to the quarterfinals)
  - Group A:
    - **Zambia** 6–0 Djibouti
    - **Kenya** 2–0 Ethiopia
      - Standings: Zambia 9 points, Kenya 6, Ethiopia 3, Djibouti 0.
  - Group C:
    - Burundi 0–1 **Tanzania**
    - **Zanzibar** 0–0 **Uganda**
      - Standings: Uganda 7 points, Tanzania 6, Zanzibar 4, Burundi 0.

==== Skeleton ====
- World Cup in Cesana, Italy:
  - Men: (gold) Jon Montgomery (CAN) 1:55.54 (silver) Martins Dukurs (LAT) 1:56.01 (bronze) Jeff Pain (CAN) 1:56.05
    - Standings after 3 of 8 races: (1) Dukurs 635 points (2) Sandro Stielicke (GER) 604 (3) Frank Rommel (GER) 601
  - Women: (gold) Shelley Rudman (GBR) 2:04.72 (silver) Marion Trott (GER) 1:57.81 (bronze) Mellisa Hollingsworth (CAN) 1:58.13
    - Standings after 3 of 8 races: (1) Rudman 627 points (2) Hollingsworth 625 points (3) Amy Gough (CAN) 554

==== Speed skating ====
- World Cup 4 in Calgary, Canada:
  - 500 m women: (gold) Jenny Wolf (GER) 37.33 (silver) Wang Beixing (CHN) 37.34 (silver) Lee Sang-hwa (KOR) 37.34
  - 500 m men: (gold) Mika Poutala (FIN) 34.38 (silver) Joji Kato (JPN) 34.45 (silver) Jamie Gregg (CAN) 34.45
  - 3000 m women: (gold) Stephanie Beckert (GER) 3:56.80 (silver) Martina Sáblíková (CZE) 3:56.83 (bronze) Daniela Anschütz-Thoms (GER) 3:58.07
  - 1500 m men: (gold) Chad Hedrick (USA) 1:42.14 (silver) Shani Davis (USA) 1:42.19 (bronze) Denny Morrison (CAN) 1:42.74

==== Tennis ====
- Davis Cup Final in Barcelona, day 1:
  - Spain 2–0 Czech Republic
    - Rafael Nadal (ESP) def. Tomáš Berdych (CZE) 7–5, 6–0, 6–2
    - David Ferrer (ESP) def. Radek Štěpánek (CZE) 1–6, 2–6, 6–4, 6–4, 8–6

=== December 3, 2009 (Thursday) ===
==== American football ====
- NFL Week 13:
  - Bills Toronto Series: New York Jets 19, Buffalo Bills 13
- NCAA Division I FBS BCS Top 10:
  - The Civil War: (7) Oregon 37, (16) Oregon State 33
    - The Civil War game decides the Pac-10 Champion for the first time ever as Oregon clinches its first trip to the Rose Bowl Game in 15 years. The game also sees Oregon running back LeGarrette Blount return from a suspension after punching a Boise State player immediately after the Ducks' first game.
- Division I FCS news:
  - Hofstra University votes to close its football program after this season, citing large monetary losses. The school becomes the second in the Colonial Athletic Association to drop the sport in the last two weeks, following Northeastern. Current scholarship holders can keep their scholarships; those who seek to transfer to other schools may do so with the transfer waiting period waived. (ESPN)

==== Basketball ====
- Euroleague Regular Season Game 6: (teams in **bold** advance to the Top-16 round)
  - Group A:
    - Montepaschi Siena (Italy) 90–64 (Croatia) Cibona Zagreb
    - **Regal FC Barcelona** (Spain) 89–55 (Turkey) Fenerbahçe Ülker İstanbul
    - ASVEL Villeurbanne (France) 77–67 (Lithuania) Žalgiris Kaunas
      - Standings: Barcelona 6–0, Siena 5–1, Fenerbahçe Ülker 3–3, Villeurbanne 2–4, Cibona, Žalgiris 1–5.
  - Group B:
    - Efes Pilsen Istanbul (Turkey) 77–62 (Lithuania) Lietuvos Rytas Vilnius
      - Standings: Unicaja 5–1, Olympiacos 4–2, Efes Pilsen, Lietuvos Rytas, Partizan 3–3, Orléans 0–6.
  - Group C:
    - Union Olimpija Ljubljana (Slovenia) 65–82 (Israel) Maccabi Tel Aviv
      - Standings: Maccabi 5–1, CSKA Moscow, Caja Laboral 4–2, Roma 3–3, Maroussi, Olimpija 1–5.
  - Group D:
    - EWE Baskets Oldenburg (Germany) 80–82 (Poland) Asseco Prokom Gdynia
    - Panathinaikos Athens (Greece) 80–68 (Italy) Armani Jeans Milano
      - Standings: Real Madrid, Panathinaikos 5–1, Khimki 4–2, Asseco Prokom 2–4, Milano, EWE Baskets 1–5.

==== Biathlon ====
- World Cup 1 in Östersund, Sweden:
  - Men's 20 km Individual: (gold) Emil Hegle Svendsen (NOR) 52:43.7 (1 penalty) (silver) Tim Burke (USA) at 53:19.2 (1) (bronze) Christoph Sumann (AUT) 53:33.2 (1)

==== Cricket ====
- Sri Lanka in India:
  - 3rd Test in Mumbai, day 2:
    - Sri Lanka 393; India 443/1 (79.0 ov, Virender Sehwag 284*). India led by 50 runs with 9 wickets remaining in the 1st innings.
      - Sehwag's score is the highest in one day of a Test match in 76 years and third highest ever. He also becomes the eighth player in history who scores six Test double-centuries, and reaches the 200 mark in 168 balls, the second fastest ever.
- Pakistan in New Zealand:
  - 2nd Test in Wellington, day 1:
    - Pakistan 161/6 (58.0 ov)

==== Field hockey ====
- Men's Champions Trophy in Melbourne, Australia:
  - South Korea 5–5 Spain
  - England 2–3 Netherlands
  - Germany 3–1 Australia
    - Standings: Australia, Germany 9 points, Korea 7, Netherlands 6, Spain 2, England 1.

==== Figure skating ====
- ISU Grand Prix:
  - Grand Prix Final in Tokyo, Japan:
    - Junior Pairs – Short Program: (1) Sui Wenjing/Han Cong (CHN) 56.80 (2) Narumi Takahashi/Mervin Tran (JPN) 54.44 (3) Ksenia Stolbova/Fedor Klimov (RUS) 48.90
    - Junior Men – Short Program: (1) Song Nan (CHN) 71.70 (2) Ross Miner (USA) 70.85 (3) Yuzuru Hanyu (JPN) 69.85
    - Senior Pairs – Short Program: (1) Shen Xue/Zhao Hongbo (CHN) 75.36 (WR) (2) Aliona Savchenko/Robin Szolkowy (GER) 73.14 (3) Maria Mukhortova/Maxim Trankov (RUS) 69.78
      - Shen/Zhao better their own record by exactly 1 point.
    - Senior Ice Dance – Original Dance: (1) Meryl Davis/Charlie White (USA) 65.80 (2) Tessa Virtue/Scott Moir (CAN) 64.01 (3) Nathalie Péchalat/Fabian Bourzat (FRA) 56.93

==== Football (soccer) ====
- CECAFA Cup in Kenya: (teams in **bold** advance to the quarterfinals)
  - Group B:
    - Eritrea 1–2 **Rwanda**
    - Somalia 0–2 Zimbabwe
      - Standings: Rwanda 6 points, Zimbabwe 4, Eritrea 1, Somalia 0.
- UEFA Europa League group stage, Matchday 5: (teams in **bold** advance to the round of 32, teams in ~~strike~~ are eliminated)
  - Group D:
    - ~~Ventspils~~ (Latvia) 0–1 (Germany) Hertha BSC
    - **Sporting CP** (Portugal) 1–1 (Netherlands) Heerenveen
      - Standings: Sporting CP 11 points, Hertha BSC 7, Heerenveen 5, Ventspils 3.
  - Group E:
    - Fulham (England) 1–0 (Bulgaria) ~~CSKA Sofia~~
    - Roma (Italy) 2–1 (Switzerland) Basel
      - Standings: Roma 10 points, Basel 9, Fulham 8, CSKA Sofia 1.
  - Group F:
    - **Galatasaray** (Turkey) 1–0 (Greece) Panathinaikos
    - Dinamo București (Romania) 2–1 (Austria) ~~Sturm Graz~~
      - Standings: Galatasaray 13 points, Panathinaikos 9, Dinamo București 6, Sturm Graz 1.
  - Group J:
    - **Shakhtar Donetsk** (Ukraine) 0–0 (Belgium) Club Brugge
    - Toulouse (France) 1–0 (Serbia) ~~Partizan~~
      - Standings: Shakhtar Donetsk 13 points, Club Brugge 8, Toulouse 7, Partizan 0.
  - Group K:
    - **PSV Eindhoven** (Netherlands) 1–0 (Czech Republic) Sparta Prague
    - Copenhagen (Denmark) 2–0 (Romania) ~~CFR Cluj~~
      - Standings: PSV Eindhoven 11 points, Copenhagen, Sparta Prague 7, CFR Cluj 3.
  - Group L:
    - ~~Austria Wien~~ 0–3 (Spain) **Athletic Bilbao**
    - **Werder Bremen** (Germany) 4–1 (Portugal) ~~Nacional~~
      - Standings: Werder Bremen 13 points, Athletic Bilbao 10, Nacional, Austria Wien 2.

=== December 2, 2009 (Wednesday) ===
==== Basketball ====
- Euroleague Regular Season Game 6:
  - Group B:
    - Entente Orléans Loiret (France) 84–88 (Greece) Olympiacos Piraeus
    - Unicaja Málaga (Spain) 64–72 (Serbia) Partizan Belgrade
      - Standings: Unicaja 5–1, Olympiacos 4–2, Lietuvos Rytas 3–2, Partizan 3–3, Efes Pilsen, 2–3, Orléans 0–6.
  - Group C:
    - CSKA Moscow (Russia) 78–65 (Greece) Maroussi Athens
    - Caja Laboral Baskonia (Spain) 67–60 (Italy) Lottomatica Roma
      - Standings: Maccabi 4–1, CSKA Moscow, Caja Laboral 4–2, Roma 3–3, Olimpija 1–4, Maroussi 1–5.
  - Group D:
    - Real Madrid (Spain) 70–59 (Russia) Khimki Moscow Region
      - Standings: Real Madrid 5–1, Panathinaikos 4–1, Khimki 4–2, Milano, Asseco Prokom, EWE Baskets 1–4.
- NBA:
  - The New Jersey Nets lose to the Dallas Mavericks 117–101 and set a record for the worst start of a season with 18 straight losses. General manager Kiki Vandeweghe is appointed as head coach and will take charge on December 4 against the Charlotte Bobcats.

==== Biathlon ====
- World Cup 1 in Östersund, Sweden:
  - Women's 15 km Individual: (gold) Helena Jonsson (SWE) 43:01.4 (1 penalty) (silver) Anna Carin Olofsson-Zidek (SWE) 43:27.6 (2) (bronze) Darya Domracheva (BLR) 44:17.8 (2)

==== Cricket ====
- Sri Lanka in India:
  - 3rd Test in Mumbai, day 1:
    - Sri Lanka 366/8 (89.0 ov, Tillakaratne Dilshan 109)

==== Football (soccer) ====
- CECAFA Cup in Kenya: (teams in **bold** advance to the quarterfinals)
  - Group A:
    - **Zambia** 1–0 Ethiopia
    - Kenya 2–0 Djibouti
      - Standings: Zambia 6 points, Ethiopia, Kenya 3, Djibouti 0.
  - Group C:
    - **Uganda** 2–0 Burundi
      - Standings: Uganda 6 points, Zanzibar, Tanzania 3, Burundi 0.
- UEFA Europa League group stage, Matchday 5: (teams in **bold** advance to the round of 32, teams in ~~strike~~ are eliminated)
  - Group A:
    - ~~Timişoara~~ (Romania) 1–2 (Netherlands) **Ajax**
    - Anderlecht (Belgium) 0–1 (Croatia) Dinamo Zagreb
      - Standings: Ajax 11 points, Anderlecht 8, Dinamo Zagreb 6, Timişoara 2.
  - Group B:
    - Valencia (Spain) 3–1 (France) Lille
    - ~~Slavia Prague~~ (Czech Republic) 0–0 (Italy) Genoa
      - Standings: Valencia 9 points, Lille, Genoa 7, Slavia Prague 3.
  - Group C:
    - ~~Celtic~~ (Scotland) 2–0 (Israel) **Hapoel Tel Aviv**
    - **Hamburg** (Germany) 2–0 (Austria) ~~Rapid Wien~~
      - Standings: Hamburg 10 points, Hapoel Tel Aviv 9, Celtic 5, Rapid Wien 4.
  - Group G:
    - **Red Bull Salzburg** (Austria) 2–1 (Italy) ~~Lazio~~
    - ~~Levski Sofia~~ (Bulgaria) 0–2 (Spain) **Villarreal**
      - Standings: Red Bull Salzburg 15 points, Villarreal 9, Lazio 6, Levski Sofia 0.
  - Group H:
    - Sheriff Tiraspol (Moldova) 1–1 (Romania) ~~Steaua București~~
    - Twente (Netherlands) 0–1 (Turkey) **Fenerbahçe**
      - Standings: Fenerbahçe 12 points, Twente 7, Sheriff Tiraspol 5, Steaua București 3.
  - Group I:
    - ~~BATE Borisov~~ (Belarus) 1–2 (Portugal) **Benfica**
    - ~~AEK Athens~~ (Greece) 0–1 (England) **Everton**
      - Standings: Benfica 12 points, Everton 9, BATE, AEK Athens 4.
- Copa Sudamericana Finals, second leg: (first leg score in parentheses)
  - Fluminense (Brazil) 3–0 (1–5) (Ecuador) **LDU Quito**. LDU Quito win 5–4 on aggregate.
    - LDU win their third international trophy in the last 17 months, following the 2008 Copa Libertadores and 2009 Recopa Sudamericana.
- (South Korea) K-League Championship Final, first leg:
  - Seongnam Ilhwa Chunma 0–0 Jeonbuk Hyundai Motors

=== December 1, 2009 (Tuesday) ===
==== Field hockey ====
- Men's Champions Trophy in Melbourne, Australia:
  - Spain 4–5 Germany
  - Netherlands 1–2 South Korea
  - Australia 2–1 England
    - Standings: Australia 9 points, Germany, Korea 6, Netherlands 3, England, Spain 1.

==== Football (soccer) ====
- CECAFA Cup in Kenya: (teams in **bold** advance to the quarterfinals)
  - Group B:
    - Eritrea 0–0 Zambia
  - Group C:
    - Tanzania 1–0 Zanzibar
