= 2009–10 Biathlon World Cup – Overall Women =

== 2008–09 Top 3 Standings ==
Medal	Athlete	Points
Gold:	(Sweden) Helena Jonsson	952
Silver:	(Germany) Kati Wilhelm	952
Bronze:	(Norway) Tora Berger	894

== Events summary ==
Event:	Winner:	Second:	Third:
Östersund 15 km Individual details	Helena Jonsson; Sweden	Anna Carin Olofsson-Zidek; Sweden	Darya Domracheva; Belarus
Östersund 7.5 km Sprint details	Tora Berger; Norway	Olga Medvedtseva; Russia	Kaisa Mäkäräinen; Finland
Hochfilzen 7.5 km Sprint details	Anna Carin Olofsson-Zidek; Sweden	Helena Jonsson; Sweden	Olga Zaitseva; Russia
Hochfilzen 10 km Pursuit details	Helena Jonsson; Sweden	Svetlana Sleptsova; Russia	Olga Zaitseva; Russia
Pokljuka 15 km Individual details	Helena Jonsson; Sweden	Anna Carin Olofsson-Zidek; Sweden	Anastasiya Kuzmina; Slovakia
Pokljuka 7.5 km Sprint details	Svetlana Sleptsova; Russia	Anna Bogaliy-Titovets; Russia	Magdalena Neuner; Germany
Pokljuka 10 km Pursuit details	Svetlana Sleptsova; Russia	Magdalena Neuner; Germany	Anna Bogaliy-Titovets; Russia
Oberhof 7.5 km Sprint details	Simone Hauswald; Germany	Helena Jonsson; Sweden	Ann Kristin Flatland; Norway
Oberhof 12.5 km Mass start details	Andrea Henkel; Germany	Helena Jonsson; Sweden	Tora Berger; Norway
Ruhpolding 7.5 km Sprint details	Anna Carin Olofsson-Zidek; Sweden	Olga Medvedtseva; Russia	Magdalena Neuner; Germany
Ruhpolding 12.5 km Mass start details	Helena Jonsson; Sweden	Simone Hauswald; Germany	Magdalena Neuner; Germany
Antholz-Anterselva 15 km Individual details	Magdalena Neuner; Germany	Kati Wilhelm; Germany	Andrea Henkel; Germany
Antholz-Anterselva 7.5 km Sprint details	Magdalena Neuner; Germany	Andrea Henkel; Germany	Sandrine Bailly; France
Antholz-Anterselva 10 km Pursuit details	Andrea Henkel; Germany	Magdalena Neuner; Germany	Ann Kristin Flatland; Norway
2010 Winter Olympics 7.5 km Sprint details	Anastasiya Kuzmina; Slovakia	Magdalena Neuner; Germany	Marie Dorin; France
2010 Winter Olympics 10 km Pursuit details	Magdalena Neuner; Germany	Anastasiya Kuzmina; Slovakia	Marie-Laure Brunet; France
2010 Winter Olympics 15 km Individual details	Tora Berger; Norway	Elena Khrustaleva; Kazakhstan	Darya Domracheva; Belarus
2010 Winter Olympics 12.5 km Mass start details	Magdalena Neuner; Germany	Olga Zaitseva; Russia	Simone Hauswald; Germany
Kontiolahti 7.5 km Sprint details	Darya Domracheva; Belarus	Olga Zaitseva; Russia	Kati Wilhelm; Germany
Kontiolahti 10 km Pursuit details	Darya Domracheva; Belarus	Magdalena Neuner; Germany	Simone Hauswald; Germany
Oslo 7.5 km Sprint details	Simone Hauswald; Germany	Darya Domracheva; Belarus	Anna Carin Olofsson-Zidek; Sweden
Oslo 10 km Pursuit details	Simone Hauswald; Germany	Darya Domracheva; Belarus	Anna Carin Olofsson-Zidek; Sweden
Oslo 12.5 km Mass start details	Simone Hauswald; Germany	Vita Semerenko; Ukraine	Magdalena Neuner; Germany
Khanty-Mansiysk 7.5 km Sprint details	Iana Romanova; Russia	Marie-Laure Brunet; France	Helena Jonsson; Sweden
Khanty-Mansiysk 12.5 km Mass start details	Magdalena Neuner; Germany	Sandrine Bailly; France	Anastasia Kuzmina; Slovakia

== Standings ==
#	Name	ÖST IN	ÖST SP	HOC SP	HOC PU	POK IN	POK SP	POK PU	OBE SP	OBE MS	RUH SP	RUH MS	ANT IN	ANT SP	ANT PU	OLY SP	OLY PU	OLY IN	OLY MS	KON SP	KON PU	OSL SP	OSL PU	OSL MS	KHA SP	KHA MS	Total
1.	Magdalena Neuner (GER)	–	–	12	13	23	48	54	–	–	48	48	60	60	54	54	60	31	60	40	54	38	34	48	34	60	933
2	Simone Hauswald (GER)	~~9~~	~~0~~	43	36	14	36	30	60	36	23	54	32	36	43	15	25	–	48	29	48	60	60	60	43	23	854
3	Helena Jonsson (SWE)	60	43	54	60	60	29	36	54	54	26	60	–	–	–	29	27	0	31	32	32	17	27	13	48	21	813
4	Andrea Henkel (GER)	~~14~~	21	24	38	40	~~0~~	31	~~3~~	60	38	34	48	54	60	14	31	38	32	38	34	27	19	43	29	28	781
5	Anna Carin Olofsson-Zidek (SWE)	54	32	60	34	54	30	34	25	29	60	23	–	–	–	21	43	24	28	22	28	48	48	32	28	18	775
6	Darya Domracheva (BLR)	48	0	13	21	25	43	38	14	32	43	36	–	–	–	34	26	48	38	60	60	54	54	34	22	27	770
7	Kati Wilhelm (GER)	24	38	36	23	~~15~~	40	32	43	31	28	40	54	23	18	~~11~~	29	43	~~16~~	48	38	31	29	31	16	38	733
8	Olga Zaitseva (RUS)	0	29	48	48	–	0	–	–	38	24	26	43	34	40	36	36	15	54	54	40	25	43	19	31	36	719
9	Marie-Laure Brunet (FRA)	36	27	25	18	28	~~7~~	–	24	26	–	32	30	27	29	38	48	29	26	36	19	29	38	20	54	43	682
10	Teja Gregorin (SLO)	~~0~~	18	17	25	32	28	40	15	23	29	38	26	31	32	32	32	~~5~~	40	~~7~~	15	19	30	30	11	25	588
11	Svetlana Sleptsova (RUS)	43	25	30	54	–	60	60	40	25	20	–	–	5	12	28	23	–	27	–	–	36	31	15	12	26	572
12	Tora Berger (NOR)	27	60	27	32	–	–	–	19	48	34	28	–	15	–	8	40	60	23	12	26	13	3	22	27	40	564
13	Olga Medvedtseva (RUS)	32	54	38	24	36	24	23	22	15	54	31	–	11	3	19	21	20	43	–	–	–	–	–	40	32	542
14	Valj Semerenko (UKR)	40	14	0	–	34	15	20	38	18	–	–	19	38	34	18	18	28	22	43	43	4	10	40	25	17	538
15	Anna Boulygina (RUS)	~~0~~	28	14	15	0	1	24	29	30	40	21	–	30	19	43	38	–	11	11	31	9	24	29	36	16	499
16	Sandrine Bailly (FRA)	15	6	34	30	–	38	25	28	27	36	0	–	48	36	26	14	0	36	0	–	0	–	26	13	54	492
17	Marie Dorin (FRA)	~~0~~	1	~~0~~	12	31	~~0~~	8	36	13	15	20	12	28	30	48	24	0	25	23	24	30	21	24	38	29	492
18	Martina Beck (GER)	28	30	31	43	–	–	–	5	43	25	43	36	22	–	–	–	12	–	10	22	28	36	36	0	12	462
19	Vita Semerenko (UKR)	21	5	21	16	5	27	28	23	40	–	–	18	13	15	7	0	19	–	18	30	22	22	54	18	31	453
20	Anastasiya Kuzmina (SVK)	23	4	22	40	48	5	3	–	–	–	–	–	21	24	60	54	2	34	–	–	0	–	23	32	48	443
21	Ann Kristin Flatland (NOR)	–	10	0	10	–	–	–	48	–	32	17	–	43	48	31	34	27	30	28	–	16	15	27	0	14	430
22	Kaisa Mäkäräinen (FIN)	26	48	26	19	0	32	29	21	21	30	30	–	7	–	0	0	0	–	14	27	10	9	25	14	30	418
23	Iana Romanova (RUS)	20	0	9	6	43	0	–	–	–	31	19	27	0	13	–	–	0	–	16	25	43	32	38	60	34	416
24	Sylvie Becaert (FRA)	4	22	8	22	~~0~~	~~3~~	21	20	12	6	22	34	32	38	12	12	11	–	31	18	21	6	16	15	22	415
25	Tina Bachmann (GER)	–	–	40	31	0	0	22	27	28	27	29	13	40	31	–	–	–	–	30	9	23	23	17	0	24	414
26	Oksana Khvostenko (UKR)	38	31	0	–	26	0	–	0	–	–	–	31	25	17	30	19	34	12	34	36	0	–	21	20	20	394
27	Liudmila Kalinchik (BLR)	0	0	28	28	11	0	–	10	–	19	15	–	–	–	24	28	32	24	25	16	40	26	18	0	19	363
28	Anna Bogaliy-Titovets (RUS)	–	–	–	–	38	54	48	26	34	0	–	–	0	–	–	–	16	–	27	14	34	40	28	–	–	359
29	Olena Pidhrushna (UKR)	31	36	5	–	17	0	1	0	22	–	–	29	3	10	23	20	9	29	17	23	20	18	12	8	13	346
30	Nadezhda Skardino (BLR)	0	0	29	29	13	34	26	16	24	9	25	–	–	–	13	15	13	19	–	–	12	17	14	0	15	323
#	Name	ÖST IN	ÖST SP	HOC SP	HOC PU	POK IN	POK SP	POK PU	OBE SP	OBE MS	RUH SP	RUH MS	ANT IN	ANT SP	ANT PU	OLY SP	OLY PU	OLY IN	OLY MS	KON SP	KON PU	OSL SP	OSL PU	OSL MS	KHA SP	KHA MS	Total
31	Zina Kocher (CAN)	0	7	23	20	2	31	43	–	16	11	24	0	26	27	0	–	0	–	21	29	0	12	11	1	11	315
32	Agnieszka Cyl (POL)	0	27	1	11	10	14	27	0	20	–	–	25	29	25	0	16	36	18	1	6	2	16	–	3	–	287
33	Éva Tófalvi (ROU)	–	0	0	–	0	16	16	7	–	0	–	21	1	7	27	22	30	17	6	7	26	25	–	9	–	237
34	Song Chaoqing (CHN)	18	40	7	7	29	0	19	30	19	17	16	–	–	–	9	0	0	–	–	–	–	–	–	–	–	211
35	Elena Khrustaleva (KAZ)	0	0	10	0	18	0	–	17	–	8	–	16	0	1	40	30	54	14	–	–	–	–	–	–	–	208
36	Selina Gasparin (SUI)	0	0	0	–	22	0	–	18	–	–	–	40	17	23	0	0	1	–	–	–	32	28	–	17	–	198
37	Weronika Nowakowska (POL)	0	0	0	–	0	0	0	–	–	–	–	14	4	9	5	13	40	20	19	20	14	8	–	23	–	189
38	Wang Chunli (CHN)	6	34	16	26	8	0	–	34	17	–	27	–	–	–	0	6	8	–	–	–	–	–	–	–	–	182
39	Julie Carraz-Collin (FRA)	1	0	0	3	30	22	14	0	–	13	14	7	24	20	–	–	–	–	13	3	15	–	–	–	–	179
40	Juliane Doll (GER)	29	17	0	9	7	0	17	0	–	0	18	28	12	21	–	–	–	–	–	–	–	–	–	–	–	158
41	Kong Yingchao (CHN)	7	19	32	27	1	25	13	0	14	0	13	–	–	–	0	–	0	–	–	–	–	–	–	–	–	151
42	Natalia Levchenkova (MDA)	30	23	18	0	16	0	–	1	–	0	12	24	0	14	0	0	4	–	0	–	–	–	–	–	–	142
43	Dijana Ravnikar (SLO)	25	16	11	0	0	0	–	12	–	0	–	0	8	5	4	2	6	–	0	0	5	20	–	19	–	133
44	Katja Haller (ITA)	5	–	0	–	3	0	0	–	–	7	–	17	18	28	3	0	23	–	0	11	0	5	–	2	–	122
45	Krystyna Pałka (POL)	13	24	0	–	0	0	–	–	–	0	–	1	0	0	20	17	26	21	–	–	–	–	–	–	–	122
46	Andreja Mali (SLO)	19	16	0	0	0	0	–	9	–	0	–	22	0	–	10	8	22	15	0	0	0	–	–	–	–	121
47	Kathrin Hitzer (GER)	2	0	–	–	9	–	–	–	–	–	–	–	–	–	–	–	–	–	20	21	24	0	–	27	–	103
48	Anna Maria Nilsson (SWE)	0	20	19	5	0	0	–	0	–	0	–	–	–	–	25	0	17	13	9	0	–	–	–	–	–	99
49	Diana Rasimovičiūtė (LTU)	10	–	0	–	–	–	–	31	–	22	–	–	–	–	16	7	11	–	–	–	0	0	–	–	–	97
50	Madara Liduma (LAT)	17	13	0	–	0	4	0	0	–	16	–	0	0	–	0	3	0	–	24	17	0	–	–	–	–	94
51	Magdalena Gwizdon (POL)	0	11	0	–	0	23	18	0	–	–	–	6	9	11	6	10	0	–	–	–	–	–	–	–	–	94
52	Michela Ponza (ITA)	34	0	0	–	0	0	–	–	–	0	–	38	0	4	0	0	14	–	–	–	–	–	–	–	–	90
53	Lilia Vaygina-Efremova (UKR)	0	10	20	17	0	0	15	0	–	–	–	–	–	–	–	–	–	–	15	12	–	–	–	–	–	89
54	Olga Kudrashova (BLR)	11	0	0	2	0	0	–	32	–	2	–	–	–	–	–	–	25	–	0	8	0	7	–	0	–	87
55	Anais Bescond (FRA)	–	–	–	–	12	0	–	0	–	14	–	0	20	26	–	–	–	–	3	1	–	–	–	–	–	76
56	Karin Oberhofer (ITA)	–	–	0	–	0	12	0	–	–	0	–	23	2	6	0	0	0	–	0	10	0	14	–	5	–	72
57	Liu Xianying (CHN)	–	–	4	–	–	18	4	4	–	10	–	–	–	–	0	11	21	–	–	–	–	–	–	–	–	72
58	Zdenka Vejnarova (CZE)	0	0	0	0	0	11	11	–	–	21	–	0	19	8	0	0	0	–	0	0	0	0	–	–	–	70
59	Ekaterina Yurlova (RUS)	–	–	–	–	–	–	–	13	–	–	–	10	–	–	–	–	–	–	26	13	3	2	–	0	–	67
60	Magda Rezlerová (CZE)	0	0	3	0	0	0	0	–	–	0	–	15	14	0	22	9	0	–	0	–	–	–	–	–	–	63
#	Name	ÖST IN	ÖST SP	HOC SP	HOC PU	POK IN	POK SP	POK PU	OBE SP	OBE MS	RUH SP	RUH MS	ANT IN	ANT SP	ANT PU	OLY SP	OLY PU	OLY IN	OLY MS	KON SP	KON PU	OSL SP	OSL PU	OSL MS	KHA SP	KHA MS	Total
61	Sofia Domeij (SWE)	0	0	0	–	0	21	12	11	–	5	–	–	–	–	0	0	–	–	0	0	7	0	–	6	–	62
62	Tadeja Brankovič-Likozar (SLO)	–	0	0	–	–	0	–	0	–	4	–	20	16	16	0	–	0	–	–	–	–	–	–	–	–	56
63	Veronika Vítková (CZE)	–	–	–	–	–	19	2	–	–	0	–	11	0	–	17	4	0	–	–	–	–	–	–	–	–	53
64	Natalya Burdyga (RUS)	12	–	6	14	19	–	–	–	–	–	–	–	–	–	–	–	–	–	–	–	–	–	–	–	–	51
65	Megan Tandy (CAN)	0	–	0	–	6	20	6	–	–	–	–	–	–	–	0	5	0	–	0	2	0	0	–	10	–	49
66	Kadri Lehtla (EST)	0	3	0	–	0	11	5	0	–	0	–	0	0	–	0	–	0	–	5	5	18	1	–	0	–	48
67	Synnøve Solemdal (NOR)	–	–	–	–	–	–	–	–	–	–	–	–	–	–	–	–	–	–	–	–	11	11	–	24	–	46
68	Marina Lebedeva (KAZ)	0	0	0	0	0	26	10	0	–	0	–	0	0	0	0	0	0	–	0	–	0	–	-	0	–	36
69	Jana Gerekova (SVK)	4	0	0	–	0	0	0	–	–	0	–	0	0	–	1	1	0	–	8	0	8	13	–	0	–	35
70	Mihaela Purdea (ROU)	16	0	2	0	0	2	0	0	–	1	–	9	0	–	2	0	0	–	–	–	–	–	–	–	–	32
71	Sabrina Buchholz (GER)	–	–	–	–	–	0	–	–	–	–	–	–	–	–	–	–	–	–	–	–	–	–	–	30	–	30
72	Liv Kjersti Eikeland (NOR)	0	0	0	1	21	–	–	8	–	0	–	–	–	–	0	–	0	–	0	0	0	–	–	–	–	30
73	Liu Yuan-Yuan (CHN)	0	12	0	–	0	0	–	0	–	18	–	–	–	–	–	–	–	–	–	–	–	–	–	–	–	30
74	Olga Nazarova (BLR)	0	–	0	–	27	0	–	0	–	0	–	–	0	–	0	–	–	–	–	–	–	–	–	–	–	27
75	Nina Klenovska (BUL)	8	0	0	–	0	0	0	0	–	12	–	–	–	–	0	–	0	–	0	–	0	0	–	7	–	27
76	Anna Lebedeva (KAZ)	0	–	0	–	–	–	–	0	–	0	–	0	0	22	0	0	3	–	0	–	0	0	–	0	–	25
77	Dong Xue (CHN)	0	0	0	0	24	0	–	0	–	0	–	–	–	–	–	–	–	–	–	–	–	–	–	–	–	24
78	Liudmila Ananko (BLR)	0	8	15	–	–	0	–	0	–	–	–	–	–	–	–	–	–	–	–	–	–	–	–	–	–	23
79	Fuyuko Suzuki (JPN)	22	0	0	–	0	0	–	0	–	0	–	0	0	–	0	0	0	–	0	–	0	–	–	–	–	22
80	Natalya Sokolova (RUS)	–	–	–	–	–	–	–	–	–	–	–	–	–	–	–	–	–	–	–	–	–	–	–	21	–	21
81	Haley Johnson (USA)	0	0	0	–	20	0	–	0	–	0	–	0	0	0	0	–	0	–	–	–	–	–	–	–	–	20
82	Lanny Barnes (USA)	0	0	0	–	0	0	0	–	–	0	–	0	0	–	0	–	18	–	0	–	0	–	–	–	–	18
83	Mari Laukkanen (FIN)	0	0	0	–	–	9	7	0	–	0	–	0	0	2	0	–	0	–	–	–	–	–	–	0	–	18
84	Alexandra Stoian (ROU)	0	0	0	–	0	17	0	0	–	0	–	0	0	–	0	–	–	–	–	–	–	–	–	–	–	17
85	Kari Henneseid Eie (NOR)	–	–	–	–	0	0	0	2	–	0	–	5	10	0	–	–	–	–	0	0	0	0	–	–	–	17
86	Megan Imrie (CAN)	–	0	0	0	0	0	0	–	–	0	–	0	0	0	0	–	0	–	9	0	6	0	–	0	–	15
87	Jenny Jonsson (SWE)	0	–	–	–	0	0	–	6	–	0	–	3	0	–	–	–	–	–	2	4	0	–	–	–	–	15
88	Gro Marit Istad Kristiansen (NOR)	0	0	–	–	0	13	0	0	–	–	–	–	–	–	0	–	–	–	0	–	–	–	–	–	–	13
89	Elisabeth Högberg (SWE)	0	0	0	4	0	0	9	–	–	0	–	–	–	–	–	–	0	–	0	0	0	–	–	0	–	13
90	Paulina Bobak (POL)	0	2	0	–	0	8	0	0	–	0	–	0	0	1	–	–	–	–	–	–	–	–	–	–	–	11
91	Solveig Rogstad (NOR)	–	–	0	8	–	–	–	0	–	0	–	–	–	–	–	–	0	–	–	–	–	–	–	–	–	8
92	Martina Halinárová (SVK)	0	0	–	–	0	0	0	–	–	0	–	8	0	0	0	0	0	–	–	–	–	–	–	–	–	8
93	Laure Soulie (AND)	–	–	–	–	–	–	–	–	–	–	–	4	0	0	–	–	–	–	–	–	0	4	–	–	–	8
94	Sara Studebaker (USA)	0	0	0	–	0	0	–	–	–	0	–	0	0	–	0	0	7	–	0	0	0	0	–	–	–	7
95	Lyubov Filimonova (KAZ)	0	0	0	–	0	6	0	0	–	0	–	0	0	–	0	–	0	–	0	–	0	0	–	0	–	6
96	Oksana Yakovleva (UKR)	–	–	–	–	0	–	–	–	–	0	–	0	6	–	–	–	–	–	–	–	–	–	–	–	–	6
97	Barbora Tomesova (CZE)	0	0	0	–	–	–	–	–	–	–	–	–	–	–	–	–	–	–	4	0	1	0	–	0	–	5
98	Magdalena Nykiel (POL)	–	–	–	–	–	–	–	–	–	–	–	–	–	–	–	–	–	–	0	0	0	–	–	4	–	4
99	Reka Ferencz (ROU)	–	–	0	–	4	0	–	0	–	0	–	–	–	–	–	–	0	–	–	–	0	–	–	0	–	4
100	Lyudmyla Pysarenko (UKR)	–	–	–	–	–	–	–	0	–	3	–	–	–	–	–	–	–	–	–	–	–	–	–	–	–	3
101	Mun Ji-Hee (KOR)	0	0	0	–	0	0	–	0	–	0	–	2	0	–	0	–	0	–	–	–	–	–	–	–	–	2
#	Name	ÖST IN	ÖST SP	HOC SP	HOC PU	POK IN	POK SP	POK PU	OBE SP	OBE MS	RUH SP	RUH MS	ANT IN	ANT SP	ANT PU	OLY SP	OLY PU	OLY IN	OLY MS	KON SP	KON PU	OSL SP	OSL PU	OSL MS	KHA SP	KHA MS	Total
