= Biathlon World Championships 2007 – Women's individual =

Below are the results of the 2007 Biathlon World Championships 2007 for the men's relay, which took place on 7 February 2007.

== Results ==
Rank	Athlete	Nation	Ski Time	P1	S1	P2	S2	T	Result	Behind
1st place, gold medalist(s)	Linda Grubben	(Norway) NOR	46:24.3	0	0	0	0	0	46:24.3	0
2nd place, silver medalist(s)	Florence Baverel-Robert	(France) FRA	47:30.8	0	0	0	0	0	47:30.8	+1:06.5
3rd place, bronze medalist(s)	Martina Glagow	(Germany) GER	46:59.9	1	0	0	0	1	47:59.9	+1:35.6
4	Tora Berger	(Norway) NOR	47:09.2	0	0	1	0	1	48:09.2	+1:44.9
5	Anna Carin Olofsson	(Sweden) SWE	44:23.7	0	2	0	2	4	48:23.7	+1:59.4
6	Andrea Henkel	(Germany) GER	45:35.5	1	1	0	1	3	48:35.5	+2:11.2
7	Ekaterina Iourieva	(Russia) RUS	47:49.6	0	1	0	0	1	48:49.6	+2:25.3
8	Kaisa Mäkäräinen	(Finland) FIN	47:02.7	0	1	0	1	2	49:02.7	+2:38.4
9	Sandrine Bailly	(France) FRA	48:39.3	0	0	0	1	1	49:39.3	+3:15.0
10	Oksana Khvostenko	(Ukraine) UKR	47:41.8	1	0	1	0	2	49:41.8	+3:17.5
11	Olga Kudrashova	(Belarus) BLR	46:50.7	3	0	0	0	3	49:50.7	+3:26.4
12	Katja Haller	(Italy) ITA	48:52.4	1	0	0	0	1	49:52.4	+3:28.1
13	Teja Gregorin	(Slovenia) SLO	47:04.9	0	0	0	3	3	50:04.9	+3:40.6
14	Qiao Yin	(China) CHN	48:08.5	1	0	0	1	2	50:08.5	+3:44.2
15	Madara Liduma	(Latvia) LAT	46:08.6	0	3	0	1	4	50:08.6	+3:44.3
16	Liudmila Ananko	(Belarus) BLR	47:09.8	1	1	0	1	3	50:09.8	+3:45.5
17	Martina Halinarova	(Slovakia) SVK	49:12.8	0	1	0	0	1	50:12.8	+3:48.5
18	Helena Jonsson	(Sweden) SWE	47:16.5	1	1	1	0	3	50:16.5	+3:52.2
19	Irina Mozhevitina	(Kazakhstan) KAZ	50:24.4	0	0	0	0	0	50:24.4	+4:00.1
20	Vita Semerenko	(Ukraine) UKR	48:25.1	0	1	0	1	2	50:25.1	+4:00.8
21	Anna Maria Nilsson	(Sweden) SWE	48:32.8	0	0	1	1	2	50:32.8	+4:08.5
22	Tatiana Moiseeva	(Russia) RUS	47:35.8	1	1	1	0	3	50:35.8	+4:11.5
23	Tadeja Brankovič	(Slovenia) SLO	46:36.4	1	0	2	1	4	50:36.4	+4:12.1
24	Michela Ponza	(Italy) ITA	47:37.4	1	0	2	0	3	50:37.4	+4:13.1
25	Krystyna Pałka	(Poland) POL	48:42.7	2	0	0	0	2	50:42.7	+4:18.4
26	Delphine Peretto	(France) FRA	48:53.3	0	1	1	0	2	50:53.3	+4:29.0
27	Xianying Liu	(China) CHN	47:55.8	1	0	1	1	3	50:55.8	+4:31.5
28	Eveli Saue	(Estonia) EST	47:59.1	2	1	0	0	3	50:59.1	+4:34.8
29	Zina Kocher	(Canada) CAN	49:00.2	1	0	0	1	2	51:00.2	+4:35.9
30	Liv Kjersti Eikeland	(Norway) NOR	50:03.5	0	0	1	0	1	51:03.5	+4:39.2
31	Kathrin Hitzer	(Germany) GER	46:10.8	2	2	1	0	5	51:10.8	+4:46.5
32	Magdalena Gwizdon	(Poland) POL	48:16.7	0	1	1	1	3	51:16.7	+4:52.4
33	Zdenka Vejnarova	(Czech Republic) CZE	48:23.7	0	1	0	2	3	51:23.7	+4:59.4
34	Natalya Sokolova	(Belarus) BLR	47:27.1	1	0	2	1	4	51:27.1	+5:02.8
35	Andreja Mali	(Slovenia) SLO	49:27.2	0	0	1	1	2	51:27.2	+5:02.9
36	Valj Semerenko	(Ukraine) UKR	48:31.7	0	2	0	1	3	51:31.7	+5:07.4
37	Yingchao Kong	(China) CHN	47:42.5	1	2	0	1	4	51:42.5	+5:18.2
38	Gerda Krumina	(Latvia) LAT	49:47.6	0	1	0	1	2	51:47.6	+5:23.3
39	Dijana Grudicek	(Slovenia) SLO	48:57.5	0	0	2	1	3	51:57.5	+5:33.2
40	Nadezhda Skardino	(Belarus) BLR	50:00.3	0	1	1	0	2	52:00.3	+5:36.0
41	Pavlina Filipova	(Bulgaria) BUL	49:28.4	0	1	0	2	3	52:28.4	+6:04.1
42	Viktoria Afanasjeva	(Kazakhstan) KAZ	49:29.1	1	0	0	2	3	52:29.1	+6:04.8
43	Olga Anisimova	(Russia) RUS	48:29.2	1	1	2	0	4	52:29.2	+6:04.9
44	Selina Gasparin	(Switzerland) SUI	49:46.9	1	0	1	1	3	52:46.9	+6:22.6
45	Katarzyna Ponikwia	(Poland) POL	49:52.0	1	2	0	0	3	52:52.0	+6:27.7
46	Magda Rezlerova	(Czech Republic) CZE	48:05.0	1	3	0	1	5	53:05.0	+6:40.7
47	Sandra Keith	(Canada) CAN	50:08.2	1	1	0	1	3	53:08.2	+6:43.9
48	Ann Kristin Flatland	(Norway) NOR	50:10.0	2	0	1	0	3	53:10.0	+6:45.7
49	Sylvie Becaert	(France) FRA	50:10.2	0	0	1	2	3	53:10.2	+6:45.9
50	Tracy Barnes	United States	50:22.5	0	2	1	0	3	53:22.5	+6:58.2
51	Anna Bogaliy-Titovets	(Russia) RUS	48:29.9	2	1	2	0	5	53:29.9	+7:05.6
52	Oksana Yakovleva	(Ukraine) UKR	50:40.5	0	1	1	1	3	53:40.5	+7:16.2
53	Lanny Barnes	United States	50:58.1	1	0	2	0	3	53:58.1	+7:33.8
54	Xue Dong	(China) CHN	48:21.6	1	1	2	2	6	54:21.6	+7:57.3
55	Sona Mihokova	(Slovakia) SVK	50:22.5	1	1	1	1	4	54:22.5	+7:58.2
56	Roberta Fiandino	(Italy) ITA	49:29.4	1	0	2	2	5	54:29.4	+8:05.1
57	Dana Plotogea	(Romania) ROU	49:32.3	1	0	3	1	5	54:32.3	+8:08.0
58	Megumi Izumi	(Japan) JPN	53:35.8	0	0	0	1	1	54:35.8	+8:11.5
59	Diana Rasimovičiūtė	(Lithuania) LTU	47:42.7	1	3	2	1	7	54:42.7	+8:18.4
60	Mihaela Purdea	(Romania) ROU	50:46.1	0	1	0	3	4	54:46.1	+8:21.8
61	Sonya Erasmus	(Canada) CAN	52:48.6	1	0	0	1	2	54:48.6	+8:24.3
62	Susanna Porela	(Finland) FIN	51:49.3	1	1	0	1	3	54:49.3	+8:25.0
63	Tagne Tahe	(Estonia) EST	50:51.6	0	2	2	0	4	54:51.6	+8:27.3
64	Alexandra Rusu	(Romania) ROU	51:24.6	0	3	0	1	4	55:24.6	+9:00.3
65	Carolyn Treacy Bramante	United States	52:25.2	0	1	0	2	3	55:25.2	+9:00.9
66	Pirjo Urpilainen	(Finland) FIN	52:36.2	0	2	1	0	3	55:36.2	+9:11.9
67	Sirli Hanni	(Estonia) EST	50:36.8	2	2	1	0	5	55:36.8	+9:12.5
68	Nina Kadeva	(Bulgaria) BUL	51:43.9	0	2	0	2	4	55:43.9	+9:19.6
69	Olga Dudchenko	(Kazakhstan) KAZ	52:50.7	0	0	3	0	3	55:50.7	+9:26.4
70	Paulina Bobak	(Poland) POL	50:53.1	2	0	3	0	5	55:53.1	+9:28.8
71	Irina Nikoultchina	(Bulgaria) BUL	47:53.7	3	2	2	1	8	55:53.7	+9:29.4
72	Radka Popova	(Bulgaria) BUL	53:13.1	0	1	0	2	3	56:13.1	+9:48.8
73	Marie Pierre Parent	(Canada) CAN	53:29.1	0	1	2	0	3	56:29.1	+10:04.8
74	Éva Tófalvi	(Romania) ROU	49:31.6	1	2	4	0	7	56:31.6	+10:07.3
75	Karin Oberhofer	(Italy) ITA	51:33.8	2	0	2	1	5	56:33.8	+10:09.5
76	Tamami Tanaka	(Japan) JPN	50:36.3	1	1	1	3	6	56:36.3	+10:12.0
77	Zuzana Tryznova	(Czech Republic) CZE	49:56.8	1	2	2	2	7	56:56.8	+10:32.5
78	Aleksandra Vasiljevic	(Bosnia and Herzegovina) BIH	53:34.7	1	0	2	1	4	57:34.7	+11:10.4
79	Petra Slezakova	(Slovakia) SVK	54:40.3	1	1	0	1	3	57:40.3	+11:16.0
80	Triin Peips	(Estonia) EST	52:48.7	1	0	0	4	5	57:48.7	+11:24.4
81	Nathalie Santer-Bjørndalen	(Belgium) BEL	48:08.7	2	3	3	2	10	58:08.7	+11:44.4
82	Galina Golushko	(Kazakhstan) KAZ	52:57.0	1	2	1	2	6	58:57.0	+12:32.7
83	Emma Fowler	(United Kingdom) GBR	52:38.0	2	3	2	0	7	59:38.0	+13:13.7
84	Jana Gerekova	(Slovakia) SVK	51:25.5	0	3	3	3	9	1:00:26.0	+14:01.2
85	Erin Graham	United States	54:12.5	1	3	2	1	7	1:01:12.5	+14:48.2
86	Kyoung-Mi Chu	(South Korea) KOR	57:26.8	0	2	1	1	4	1:01:26.8	+15:02.5
87	Liga Glazere	(Latvia) LAT	52:10.1	3	2	3	2	10	1:02:10.1	+15:45.8
88	Uiloq Slettemark	(Greenland) GRL	56:17.1	1	3	2	1	7	1:03:17.1	+16:52.8
89	Mariona Aubert	(Spain) ESP	54:25.7	4	2	2	3	11	1:05:25.7	+19:01.4

Did not start:

- Sofia Domeij, (Sweden) SWE
- Saskia Santer, (Belgium) BEL
- Lenka Munclingerova, (Czech Republic) CZE

Did not finish:

- Kati Wilhelm, (Germany) GER
