= 2009–10 Biathlon World Cup – Sprint Women =

The 2009–10 Biathlon World Cup – Sprint Women Started on Saturday December 5, 2009 in Östersund and finished Thursday March 25, 2010 in Khanty-Mansiysk. Defending titlist is Helena Jonsson of Sweden.

== Competition format ==
The 10 kilometres (6,23 mi) sprint race is the third oldest biathlon event; the distance is skied over three laps. The biathlete shoots two times at any shooting lane, first prone, then standing, totalling 10 targets. For each missed target the biathlete has to complete a penalty lap of around 150 metres. Competitors' starts are staggered, normally by 30 seconds.

== 2008–09 Top 3 Standings ==
Medal	Athlete	Points
Gold:	(Sweden) Helena Jonsson	372
Silver:	(Germany) Magdalena Neuner	358
Bronze:	(Norway) Tora Berger	352

== Medal winners ==
Event:	Gold:	Time	Silver:	Time	Bronze:	Time
Östersund details	Tora Berger; Norway	21:21.5 (0+0)	Olga Medvedtseva; Russia	21:28.3 (0+0)	Kaisa Mäkäräinen; Finland	21:31.5 (0+0)
Hochfilzen details	Anna Carin Olofsson-Zidek; Sweden	23:10.8 (0+0)	Helena Jonsson; Sweden	23:21.9 (0+0)	Olga Zaitseva; Russia	24:00.5 (0+1)
Pokljuka details	Svetlana Sleptsova; Russia	24:57.0 (0+0)	Anna Bogaliy-Titovets; Russia	25:40.4 (1+0)	Magdalena Neuner; Germany	25:59.6 (1+1)
Oberhof details	Simone Hauswald; Germany	22:15.1 (0+1)	Helena Jonsson; Sweden	22:23.8 (1+0)	Ann Kristin Flatland; Norway	22:32.6 (0+1)
Ruhpolding details	Anna Carin Olofsson-Zidek; Sweden	23:49.6 (0+0)	Olga Medvedtseva; Russia	24:19.4 (0+0)	Magdalena Neuner; Germany	24:30.2 (0+2)
Antholz details	Magdalena Neuner; Germany	20:19.7 (0+1)	Andrea Henkel; Germany	20:32.9 (0+0)	Sandrine Bailly; France	20:48.3 (0+0)
2010 Winter Olympics details	Anastasiya Kuzmina; Slovakia	19:55.6 (1+0)	Magdalena Neuner; Germany	19:57.1 (0+1)	Marie Dorin; France	20:06.5 (0+0)
Kontiolahti details	Darya Domracheva; Belarus	21:17.5 (0+0)	Olga Zaitseva; Russia	21:25.9 (0+0)	Kati Wilhelm; Germany	21:31.0 (0+0)
Oslo details	Simone Hauswald; Germany	20:42.4 (0+0)	Darya Domracheva; Belarus	20:47.3 (0+0)	Anna Carin Olofsson-Zidek; Sweden	20:56.8 (0+0)
Khanty-Mansiysk details	Iana Romanova; Russia	20:59.3 (0+0)	Marie Laure Brunet; France	21:10.2 (0+0)	Helena Jonsson; Sweden	21:14.8 (0+0)

== Standings ==
#	Name	ÖST	HOC	POK	OBE	RUH	ANT	OLY	KON	OSL	KHA	Total
1	Simone Hauswald (GER)	0	43	36	60	23	36	15	29	60	43	345
2	Magdalena Neuner (GER)	–	12	48	–	48	60	54	40	38	34	334
3	Helena Jonsson (SWE)	43	54	29	54	26	–	29	32	17	48	332
4	Anna Carin Olofsson-Zidek (SWE)	32	60	30	25	60	–	21	22	48	28	326
5	Kati Wilhelm (GER)	38	36	40	43	28	23	~~11~~	48	31	16	303
6	Darya Domracheva (BLR)	0	13	43	14	43	–	34	60	54	22	283
7	Olga Zaitseva (RUS)	29	48	0	–	24	34	36	54	25	31	281
8	Marie-Laure Brunet (FRA)	27	25	7	24	–	27	38	36	29	54	267
9	Olga Medvedtseva (RUS)	54	38	24	22	54	11	19	–	–	40	262
10	Svetlana Sleptsova (RUS)	25	30	60	40	20	5	28	–	36	12	256
11	Andrea Henkel (GER)	21	24	0	3	38	54	14	38	27	29	248
12	Anna Boulygina (RUS)	28	14	~~1~~	29	40	30	43	11	9	36	240
13	Sandrine Bailly (FRA)	6	34	38	28	36	48	26	0	0	13	229
14	Marie Dorin (FRA)	1	0	0	36	15	28	48	23	30	38	219
15	Tora Berger (NOR)	60	27	–	19	34	15	8	12	13	27	215
16	Ann Kristin Flatland (NOR)	10	0	–	48	32	43	31	28	16	0	208
17	Kaisa Mäkäräinen (FIN)	48	26	32	21	30	7	0	14	10	14	202
18	Teja Gregorin (SLO)	18	17	28	15	29	31	32	~~7~~	19	11	200
19	Valj Semerenko (UKR)	14	0	15	38	–	38	18	43	4	25	195
20	Tina Bachmann (GER)	–	40	0	27	27	40	–	30	23	0	187
21	Sylvie Becaert (FRA)	22	8	~~3~~	20	6	32	12	31	21	15	167
22	Iana Romanova (RUS)	0	9	0	–	31	0	–	16	43	60	159
23	Vita Semerenko (UKR)	5	21	27	23	–	13	7	18	22	18	154
24	Martina Beck (GER)	30	31	–	5	25	22	–	10	28	0	151
25	Liudmila Kalinchik (BLR)	0	28	0	10	19	–	24	25	40	0	146
26	Anastasiya Kuzmina (SVK)	4	22	5	–	–	21	60	–	0	32	144
27	Anna Bogaliy-Titovets (RUS)	–	–	54	26	0	0	–	27	34	–	141
28	Oksana Khvostenko (UKR)	31	0	0	0	–	25	30	34	0	20	140
29	Zina Kocher (CAN)	7	23	31	–	11	26	0	21	0	1	120
30	Nadezhda Skardino (BLR)	0	29	34	16	9	–	13	–	12	0	113
31	Olena Pidhrushna (UKR)	36	5	0	0	–	3	23	17	20	8	112
32	Song Chaoqing (CHN)	40	7	0	30	17	–	9	–	–	–	103
33	Éva Tófalvi (ROU)	0	0	16	7	0	1	27	6	26	9	92
34	Julie Carraz-Collin (FRA)	0	0	22	0	13	24	–	13	15	–	87
35	Wang Chunli (CHN)	34	16	0	34	–	–	0	–	–	–	84
36	Selina Gasparin (SUI)	0	0	0	18	–	17	0	–	32	17	84
37	Agnieszka Cyl (POL)	27	1	14	0	–	29	0	1	2	3	77
38	Kong Yingchao (CHN)	19	32	25	0	0	–	0	–	–	–	76
39	Elena Khrustaleva (KAZ)	0	10	0	17	8	0	40	–	–	–	75
40	Dijana Ravnikar (SLO)	16	11	0	12	0	8	4	0	5	19	75
41	Kathrin Hitzer (GER)	0	–	–	–	–	–	–	20	24	27	71
42	Diana Rasimovičiūtė (LTU)	–	0	–	31	22	–	16	–	0	–	69
43	Weronika Nowakowska (POL)	0	0	0	–	–	4	5	19	14	23	65
44	Anna Maria Nilsson (SWE)	20	19	0	0	0	–	25	0	–	–	64
45	Madara Liduma (LAT)	13	0	4	0	16	0	0	24	0	–	57
46	Zdenka Vejnarova (CZE)	0	0	11	–	21	19	0	0	0	0	51
47	Sofia Domeij (SWE)	0	0	21	11	5	–	0	0	7	6	50
48	Magdalena Gwizdon (POL)	11	0	23	0	–	9	6	–	–	–	49
49	Lilia Vaygina-Efremova (UKR)	10	20	0	0	–	–	–	15	–	–	45
50	Krystyna Pałka (POL)	24	0	0	–	0	0	20	–	–	–	44
51	Ekaterina Yurlova (RUS)	–	–	–	13	–	–	–	26	3	0	42
52	Natalia Levchenkova (MDA)	23	18	0	1	0	0	0	0	–	–	42
53	Magda Rezlerová (CZE)	0	3	0	–	0	14	22	0	–	–	39
54	Anais Bescond (FRA)	–	–	0	0	14	20	–	3	–	–	37
55	Kadri Lehtla (EST)	3	0	11	0	0	0	0	5	18	0	37
56	Veronika Vítková (CZE)	–	–	19	–	0	0	17	–	–	–	36
57	Liu Xianying (CHN)	–	4	18	4	10	–	0	–	–	–	36
58	Synnøve Solemdal (NOR)	–	–	–	–	–	–	–	–	11	24	35
59	Andreja Mali (SLO)	16	0	0	9	0	0	10	0	0	–	35
60	Olga Kudrashova (BLR)	0	0	0	32	2	–	–	0	0	0	34
61	Sabrina Buchholz (GER)	–	–	0	–	–	–	–	–	–	30	30
62	Megan Tandy (CAN)	–	0	20	–	–	–	0	0	0	10	30
63	Liu Yuan-Yuan (CHN)	12	0	0	0	18	–	–	–	–	–	30
64	Katja Haller (ITA)	–	0	0	–	7	18	3	0	0	2	30
65	Juliane Doll (GER)	17	0	0	0	0	12	–	–	–	–	29
66	Marina Lebedeva (KAZ)	0	0	26	0	0	0	0	0	0	0	26
67	Liudmila Ananko (BLR)	8	15	0	0	–	–	–	–	–	–	23
68	Natalya Sokolova (RUS)	–	–	–	–	–	–	–	–	–	21	21
69	Tadeja Brankovič-Likozar (SLO)	0	0	0	0	4	16	0	–	–	–	20
70	Nina Klenovska (BUL)	0	0	0	0	12	–	0	0	0	7	19
71	Karin Oberhofer (ITA)	–	0	12	–	0	2	0	0	0	5	19
72	Alexandra Stoian (ROU)	0	0	17	0	0	0	0	–	–	–	17
73	Jana Gereková (SVK)	0	0	0	–	0	0	1	8	8	0	17
74	Megan Imrie (CAN)	0	0	0	–	0	0	0	9	6	0	15
75	Gro Marit Istad Kristiansen (NOR)	0	–	13	0	–	–	0	0	–	–	13
76	Kari Henneseid Eie (NOR)	–	–	0	2	0	10	–	0	0	–	12
77	Paulina Bobak (POL)	2	0	8	0	0	0	–	–	–	–	10
78	Mari Laukkanen (FIN)	0	0	9	0	0	0	0	–	–	0	9
79	Liv Kjersti Eikeland (NOR)	0	0	–	8	0	–	0	0	0	–	8
80	Jenny Jonsson (SWE)	–	–	0	6	0	0	–	2	0	–	8
81	Mihaela Purdea (ROU)	0	2	2	0	1	0	2	–	–	–	7
82	Lyubov Filimonova (KAZ)	0	0	6	0	0	0	0	0	0	0	6
83	Oksana Yakovleva (UKR)	–	–	–	–	0	6	–	–	–	–	6
84	Natalya Burdyga (RUS)	–	6	–	–	–	–	–	–	–	–	6
85	Barbora Tomesova (CZE)	0	0	–	–	–	–	–	4	1	0	5
86	Magdalena Nykiel (POL)	–	–	–	–	–	–	–	0	0	4	4
87	Lyudmyla Pysarenko (UKR)	–	–	–	0	3	–	–	–	–	–	3
