= Latvia at the 2010 Winter Olympics =

- IOC code: LAT
- NOC: Latvian Olympic Committee
- Website: www.olimpiade.lv (in Latvian and English)

in Vancouver, Canada
- Competitors: 58 in 9 sports
- Flag bearer: Martins Dukurs
- Medals Ranked 23rd: Gold 0 Silver 2 Bronze 0 Total 2

Winter Olympics appearances (overview)
- 1924; 1928; 1932; 1936; 1948–1988; 1992; 1994; 1998; 2002; 2006; 2010; 2014; 2018; 2022; 2026

Other related appearances
- Soviet Union (1956–1988)

Latvia participated at the 2010 Winter Olympics in Vancouver, British Columbia, Canada, with 58 athletes in 9 sports, which tied the biggest Latvian delegation to the Olympics ever.

At the Games, Haralds Silovs became the first athlete in Olympic games to participate in both short track (1500m) and long track (5000m) speed skating, and the first to compete in two different disciplines on the same day.

Bobsledder Jānis Miņins, who was among the favourites in four-man bobsleigh, missed the Olympics, because of an appendix surgery he went through, when he had already arrived in Canada just days before the Olympic start. He participated also in several trainings for the four-man event, but after crashing twice, decided not to start.

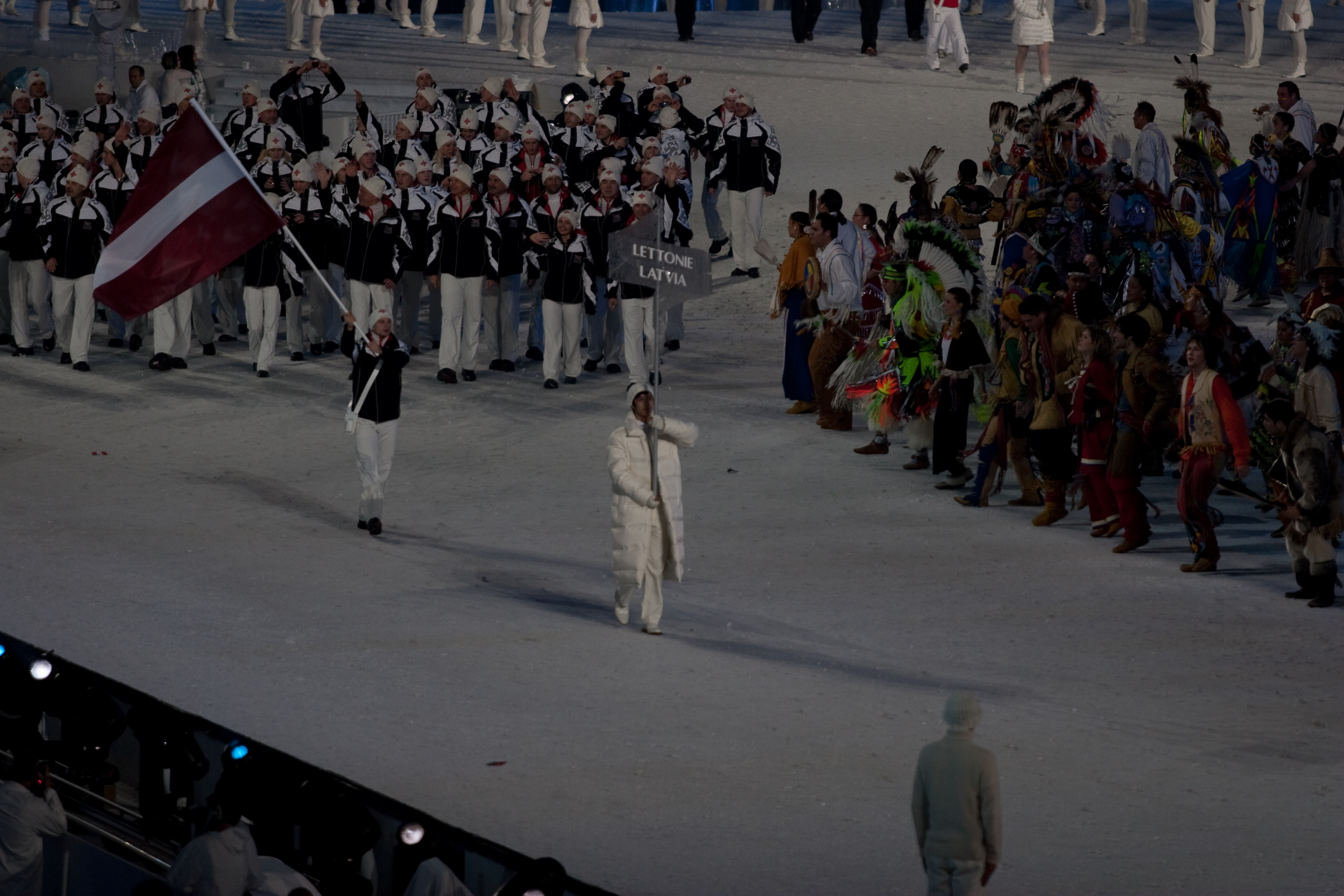
The athletes entering the stadium during the opening ceremonies.

== Medalists ==
| Medal | Name | Sport | Event | Date |
|---|---|---|---|---|
| Silver | Andris Šics; Juris Šics | Luge | Doubles | February 17 |
| Silver | Martins Dukurs | Skeleton | Men's | February 19 |

== Alpine skiing ==
Men

| Athlete | Event | Final | |
| Athlete | Event | Time | Rank |
|---|---|---|---|
| Roberts Rode | Downhill | 2:03.36 | 58 |
| Roberts Rode | Combined | - | DNF |
| Kristaps Zvejnieks | Giant slalom | 2:58.62 | 62 |
| Kristaps Zvejnieks | Slalom | 1:51.29 | 37 |

Women

| Athlete | Event | Final | |
| Athlete | Event | Time | Rank |
|---|---|---|---|
| Liene Fimbauere | Giant slalom | 2:46.93 | 51 |
| Liene Fimbauere | Slalom | 2:02.11 | 49 |

== Biathlon ==
Men

| Athlete | Event | Final | | |
| Athlete | Event | Time | Misses | Rank |
|---|---|---|---|---|
| Ilmārs Bricis | Sprint | 25:41.3 | 2 (1+1) | 14 |
| Ilmārs Bricis | Pursuit | 36:14.9 | 4 (0+0+2+2) | 32 |
| Ilmārs Bricis | Individual | 108:33.9 | 6 (3+1+1+1) | 74 |
| Kaspars Dumbris | Individual | 56:30.1 | 5 (2+0+2+1) | 73 |
| Kristaps Lībietis | Sprint | 27:32.5 | 1 (1+0) | 64 |
| Kristaps Lībietis | Individual | 56:02.4 | 3 (2+0+1+0) | 70 |
| Edgars Piksons | Sprint | 28:23.0 | 2 (1+1) | 78 |
| Edgars Piksons | Individual | 52:52.5 | 2 (1+1+0+0) | 37 |
| Andrejs Rastorgujevs | Sprint | 27:05.3 | 3 (2+1) | 50 |
| Andrejs Rastorgujevs | Pursuit | 41:35.9 | 9 (2+2+3+2) | 58 |
| Edgars Piksons; Ilmārs Bricis; Andrejs Rastorgujevs; Kristaps Lībietis | Relay | 1:35:15.5 | 7+16 | 18 |

Women

| Athlete | Event | Final | | |
| Athlete | Event | Time | Misses | Rank |
|---|---|---|---|---|
| Līga Glāzere | Sprint | 22:47.7 | 1 (0+1) | 69 |
| Līga Glāzere | Individual | 50:20.3 | 5 (3+0+1+1) | 78 |
| Žanna Juškāne | Sprint | 23:32.4 | 3 (1+2) | 79 |
| Žanna Juškāne | Individual | 53:36.4 | 7 (3+1+1+2) | 84 |
| Gerda Krūmiņa | Sprint | 22:09.3 | 1 (0+1) | 48 |
| Gerda Krūmiņa | Pursuit | 34:02.6 | 3 (0+0+2+1) | 57 |
| Gerda Krūmiņa | Individual | 48:00.1 | 4 (0+3+1+0) | 69 |
| Madara Līduma | Sprint | 22:23.8 | 4 (2+2) | 57 |
| Madara Līduma | Pursuit | 37:58.7 | 4 (0+2+1+1) | 38 |
| Madara Līduma | Individual | 47:30.2 | 6 (0+3+1+2) | 67 |
| Žanna Juškāne; Madara Līduma; Līga Glāzere; Gerda Krūmiņa | Relay | 1:18:56.2 | 4+12 | 19 |

== Bobsleigh ==
Two-man

| Sled | Athletes | Final | | | | | |
| Sled | Athletes | Run 1 | Run 2 | Run 3 | Run 4 | Total | Rank |
|---|---|---|---|---|---|---|---|
| LAT I | Daumants Dreiškens; Edgars Maskalāns | 52.16 | 52.32 | 52.17 | 52.43 | 3:29.08 | 8 |

Four-man

| Sled | Athletes | Final | | | | | |
| Sled | Athletes | Run 1 | Run 2 | Run 3 | Run 4 | Total | Rank |
|---|---|---|---|---|---|---|---|
| LAT I | Jānis Miņins; Daumants Dreiškens; Oskars Melbārdis; Intars Dambis | DNS | | | | | |
| LAT II | Edgars Maskalāns; Pāvels Tulubjevs; Raivis Broks; Mihails Arhipovs | 51.60 | 51.42 | 51.85 | 51.78 | 3:26.65 | 11 |

== Cross-country skiing ==
Men

| Athlete | Event | Final | |
| Athlete | Event | Time | Rank |
|---|---|---|---|
| Jānis Paipals | 15km freestyle | 38:18.0 | 72 |
| Jānis Paipals | 30km pursuit | LAP | 54 |
| Jānis Paipals | Sprint | 4:04.48 | 62 |

Women

| Athlete | Event | Final | |
| Athlete | Event | Time | Rank |
|---|---|---|---|
| Anete Brice | 10km freestyle | 30:51.8 | 70 |

== Ice hockey ==
=== Men's tournament ===
Roster

The following is the Latvian roster in the men's ice hockey tournament of the 2010 Winter Olympics.

| No. | Pos. | Name | Height | Weight | Birthdate | Birthplace | 2009–10 team |
|---|---|---|---|---|---|---|---|
| 31 | G | Edgars Masaļskis | 177 cm (5 ft 10 in) | 75 kg (165 lb) | 31 March 1980 | Riga | (Latvia) Dinamo Riga (KHL) |
| 1 | G | Ervīns Muštukovs | 184 cm (6 ft 0 in) | 75 kg (165 lb) | 7 April 1984 | Riga | (Latvia) Dinamo-Juniors Riga (BLR) |
| 30 | G | Sergejs Naumovs | 178 cm (5 ft 10 in) | 78 kg (172 lb) | 4 April 1969 | Riga | (Latvia) Dinamo Riga (KHL) |
| 8 | D | Oskars Bārtulis | 188 cm (6 ft 2 in) | 92 kg (203 lb) | 21 January 1987 | Ogre | (United States) Philadelphia Flyers (NHL) |
| 13 | D | Guntis Galviņš | 186 cm (6 ft 1 in) | 87 kg (192 lb) | 25 January 1986 | Talsi | (Latvia) Dinamo Riga (KHL) |
| 2 | D | Rodrigo Laviņš | 178 cm (5 ft 10 in) | 85 kg (187 lb) | 3 August 1974 | Riga | (Latvia) Dinamo Riga (KHL) |
| 71 | D | Georgijs Pujacs | 185 cm (6 ft 1 in) | 95 kg (209 lb) | 11 June 1981 | Riga | (Russia) Sibir Novosibirsk (KHL) |
| 26 | D | Krišjānis Rēdlihs | 189 cm (6 ft 2 in) | 80 kg (180 lb) | 15 January 1981 | Riga | (Latvia) Dinamo Riga (KHL) |
| 3 | D | Arvīds Reķis | 180 cm (5 ft 11 in) | 90 kg (200 lb) | 1 January 1979 | Jūrmala | (Germany) Grizzly Adams Wolfsburg (DEL) |
| 7 | D | Kārlis Skrastiņš – C | 188 cm (6 ft 2 in) | 93 kg (205 lb) | 9 July 1974 | Riga | (United States) Dallas Stars (NHL) |
| 11 | D | Kristaps Sotnieks | 180 cm (5 ft 11 in) | 80 kg (180 lb) | 29 January 1987 | Riga | (Latvia) Dinamo Riga (KHL) |
| 75 | F | Ģirts Ankipāns | 183 cm (6 ft 0 in) | 83 kg (183 lb) | 29 November 1975 | Riga | (Latvia) Dinamo Riga (KHL) |
| 21 | F | Armands Bērziņš | 192 cm (6 ft 4 in) | 90 kg (200 lb) | 27 December 1983 | Riga | (Latvia) Dinamo Riga (KHL) |
| 47 | F | Mārtiņš Cipulis | 180 cm (5 ft 11 in) | 81 kg (179 lb) | 29 November 1980 | Cēsis | (Latvia) Dinamo Riga (KHL) |
| 10 | F | Lauris Dārziņš | 190 cm (6 ft 3 in) | 90 kg (200 lb) | 28 January 1985 | Riga | (Latvia) Dinamo Riga (KHL) |
| 16 | F | Kaspars Daugaviņš | 183 cm (6 ft 0 in) | 93 kg (205 lb) | 18 May 1988 | Riga | (United States) Binghamton Senators (AHL) |
| 9 | F | Mārtiņš Karsums | 178 cm (5 ft 10 in) | 90 kg (200 lb) | 26 February 1986 | Riga | (Latvia) Dinamo Riga (KHL) |
| 87 | F | Gints Meija | 183 cm (6 ft 0 in) | 80 kg (180 lb) | 4 September 1987 | Riga | (Latvia) Dinamo Riga (KHL) |
| 17 | F | Aleksandrs Ņiživijs – A | 177 cm (5 ft 10 in) | 77 kg (170 lb) | 16 September 1976 | Riga | (Latvia) Dinamo Riga (KHL) |
| 24 | F | Miķelis Rēdlihs | 180 cm (5 ft 11 in) | 80 kg (180 lb) | 1 July 1984 | Riga | (Latvia) Dinamo Riga (KHL) |
| 88 | F | Aleksejs Širokovs | 182 cm (6 ft 0 in) | 86 kg (190 lb) | 20 February 1981 | Riga | (Russia) Amur Khabarovsk (KHL) |
| 5 | F | Jānis Sprukts | 190 cm (6 ft 3 in) | 104 kg (229 lb) | 31 January 1982 | Riga | (Latvia) Dinamo Riga (KHL) |
| 12 | F | Herberts Vasiļjevs – A | 181 cm (5 ft 11 in) | 80 kg (180 lb) | 23 May 1976 | Riga | (Germany) Krefeld Pinguine (DEL) |

==== Group play ====
Latvia played in Group B.

Round-robin

All times are local (UTC-8).

| 16 February 2010; 21:00 | Russia | 8–2 (3–0, 1–0, 4–2) | Latvia | Canada Hockey Place, Vancouver; Attendance: 16,862 |

Game reference

Evgeni Nabokov
Goalies
Edgars Masaļskis
Referees:
(United States) Dennis LaRue
(Sweden) Marcus Vinnerborg
Linesmen:
(United States) Peter Feola
(Canada) Jay Sharrers

| D. Zaripov (S. Fedorov, I. Nikulin) – 2:38 | 1–0 |
| A. Radulov (S. Fedorov, D. Kalinin) – 7:46 | 2–0 |
| A. Ovechkin (A. Semin) – 19:25 | 3–0 |
| E. Malkin (M. Afinogenov, I. Kovalchuk) (PP) – 38:18 | 4–0 |
| | 4–1 | 40:33 – H. Vasiļjevs (A. Ņiživijs, M. Cipulis) |
| A. Ovechkin (P. Datsyuk) – 40:59 | 5–1 |
| D. Zaripov (S. Zinovyev) – 41:30 | 6–1 |
| I. Kovalchuk (E. Malkin, F. Tyutin) – 43:04 | 7–1 |
| | 7–2 | 43:35 – Ģ. Ankipāns (J. Sprukts, M. Karsums) |
| A. Morozov (A. Markov) – 58:57 | 8–2 |

10 min
Penalties
16 min
45
Shots
20

| 19 February 2010; 16:30 | Czech Republic | 5–2 (3–0, 1–2, 1–0) | Latvia | Canada Hockey Place, Vancouver; Attendance: 16,984 |

Game reference

Tomáš Vokoun
Goalies
Edgars Masaļskis
Referees:
(Finland) Jyri Rönn
(United States) Chris Rooney
Linesmen:
(Finland) Stefan Fonselius
(United States) Thor Nelson

| D. Krejčí (M. Erat, T. Fleischmann) – 2:30 | 1–0 |
| M. Michálek (M. Židlický, T. Plekanec) – 3:33 | 2–0 |
| J. Jágr (M. Židlický, T. Kaberle) (PP) – 5:07 | 3–0 |
| T. Kaberle (P. Eliáš, M. Židlický) (PP) – 26:33 | 4–0 |
| | 4–1 | 35:30 – K. Sotnieks (H. Vasiļjevs) |
| | 4–2 | 38:26 – Ģ. Ankipāns (M. Karsums, G. Pujacs) (PP) |
| P. Eliáš (SH) (EN) – 59:42 | 5–2 |

10 min
Penalties
26 min
39
Shots
18

| 20 February 2010; 16:30 | Latvia | 0–6 (0–3, 0–2, 0–1) | Slovakia | Canada Hockey Place, Vancouver; Attendance: 17,023 |

Game reference

Edgars Masaļskis
Goalies
Jaroslav Halák
Referees:
(Canada) Dan O'Halloran
(Sweden) Marcus Vinnerborg
Linesmen:
(Ukraine) Andriy Kicha
(United States) Brian Murphy

| 0–1 | 2:44 – Ľ. Višňovský (J. Stümpel, R. Zedník) (PP) |
| 0–2 | 9:11 – R. Zedník (M. Handzuš, Ľ. Bartečko) |
| 0–3 | 17:08 – J. Stümpel (Ž. Pálffy) |
| 0–4 | 21:07 – Mari. Hossa (J. Stümpel) (PP) |
| 0–5 | 22:20 – M. Handzuš |
| 0–6 | 57:20 – I. Baranka (M. Štrbák, M. Handzuš) |

6 min
Penalties
8 min
21
Shots
37

Standings

| Team | Pld | W | OTW | OTL | L | GF | GA | GD | Pts | Qualification |
|---|---|---|---|---|---|---|---|---|---|---|
| Russia | 3 | 2 | 0 | 1 | 0 | 13 | 6 | +7 | 7 | Quarterfinals |
| Czech Republic | 3 | 2 | 0 | 0 | 1 | 10 | 7 | +3 | 6 | |
| Slovakia | 3 | 1 | 1 | 0 | 1 | 9 | 4 | +5 | 5 | |
| Latvia | 3 | 0 | 0 | 0 | 3 | 4 | 19 | −15 | 0 | |

Source: IIHF

==== Final rounds ====
Qualification playoff

| 23 February 2010; 19:00 | Czech Republic | 3–2 (OT) (2–0, 0–0, 0–2, 1–0) | Latvia | UBC Thunderbird Arena, Vancouver; Attendance: 5,448 |

Game reference

Tomáš Vokoun
Goalies
Edgars Masaļskis
Referees:
(Canada) Bill McCreary
(Switzerland) Brent Reiber
Linesmen:
(Slovakia) Milan Novak
(Germany) Felix Winnekens

| T. Rolinek (F. Kuba, M. Havlát) (PP) – 5:52 | 1–0 |
| T. Fleischmann (D. Krejčí, R. Červenka) – 11:06 | 2–0 |
| | 2–1 | 52:02 – M. Cipulis (A. Ņiživijs, K. Rēdlihs) |
| | 2–2 | 56:19 – M. Rēdlihs (A. Bērziņš, L. Dārziņš) |
| D. Krejčí (T. Fleischmann) – 65:10 | 3–2 |

10 min
Penalties
10 min
50
Shots
26

== Luge ==
| Athlete(s) | Event | Run 1 | | Run 2 | | Run 3 | | Run 4 | | Total | |
| Athlete(s) | Event | Time | Rank | Time | Rank | Time | Rank | Time | Rank | Time | Rank |
|---|---|---|---|---|---|---|---|---|---|---|---|
| Inārs Kivlenieks | Men's | 48.960 | 18 | 49.065 | 19 | 49.259 | 18 | 48.920 | 18 | 3:18.204 | 18 |
| Guntis Rēķis | Men's | 49.275 | 25 | 49.625 | 27 | 49.476 | 26 | 49.071 | 26 | 3:17.447 | 26 |
| Mārtiņš Rubenis | Men's | 48.818 | 13 | 48.831 | 11 | 49.064 | 11 | 48.809 | 11 | 3:15.525 | 11 |
| Agnese Koklača | Women's | 42.627 | 27 | 42.334 | 24 | 43.091 | 27 | 42.336 | 24 | 2:50.388 | 24 |
| Anna Orlova | Women's | 41.998 | 11 | 41.947 | 14 | 42.260 | 13 | 42.100 | 13 | 2:48.305 | 13 |
| Maija Tīruma | Women's | 41.773 | 4 | 41.933 | 8 | 42.012 | 8 | 41.936 | 9 | 2:47.654 | 9 |
| Andris Šics & Juris Šics | Doubles | 41.420 | 2 | 41.549 | 2 | | | | | 1:22.969 | 2nd place, silver medalist(s) |
| Oskars Gudramovičs & Pēteris Kalniņš | Doubles | 41.982 | 12 | 42.013 | 12 | | | | | 1:23.995 | 12 |

== Short track speed skating ==
Men

| Athlete | Event | Heats | | Quarterfinals | | Semifinals | | Final | |
| Athlete | Event | Time | Rank | Time | Rank | Time | Rank | Time | Rank |
|---|---|---|---|---|---|---|---|---|---|
| Haralds Silovs | 500 m | 41.673 | 2 Q | 41.837 | 3 | - | - | | 12 |
| Haralds Silovs | 1000 m | 1:25.951 | 2 Q | 1:50.292 | 4 | - | - | | 14 |
| Haralds Silovs | 1500 m | - | - | 2:14.900 | 2 Q | 2:14.009 | 4 QB | 2:19.435 | 10 |

== Skeleton ==
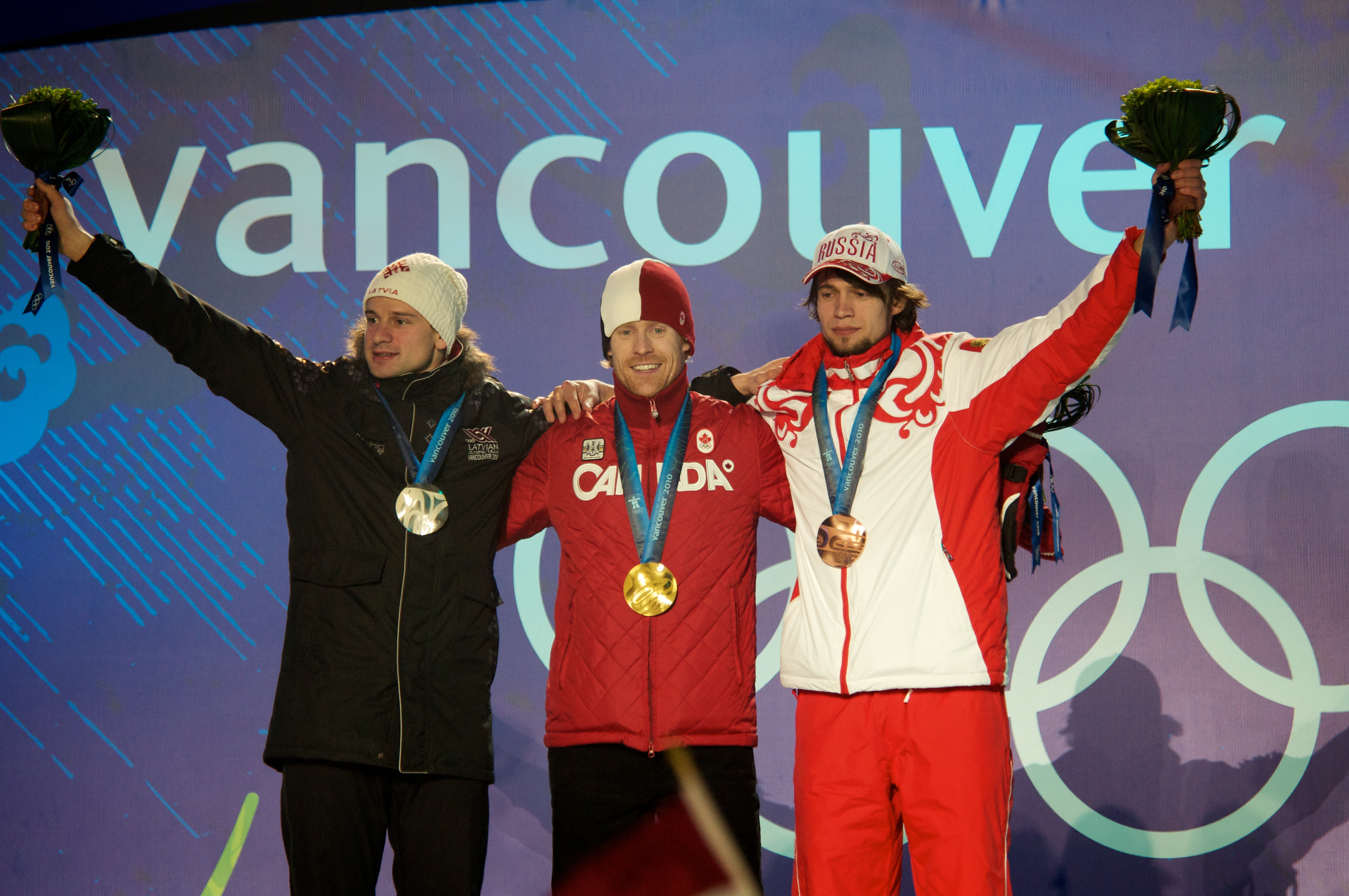
Martins Dukurs (left) at the 2010 Winter Olympics men's skeleton medal ceremony.

| Athlete(s) | Event | Run 1 | | Run 2 | | Run 3 | | Run 4 | | Total | |
| Athlete(s) | Event | Time | Rank | Time | Rank | Time | Rank | Time | Rank | Time | Rank |
|---|---|---|---|---|---|---|---|---|---|---|---|
| Martins Dukurs | Men's | 52.32 | 1 | 52.59 | 2 | 52.28 | | 52.61 | | 3:29.80 | 2nd place, silver medalist(s) |
| Tomass Dukurs | Men's | 52.94 | 8 | 52.88 | 4 | 52.62 | | 52.69 | | 3:31.13 | 4 |

== Speed skating ==
Men

| Athlete | Event | Final | |
| Athlete | Event | Time | Rank |
|---|---|---|---|
| Haralds Silovs | 5000 m | 6:35.69 | 20 |
