= Biathlon at the 2010 Winter Olympics – Women's relay =

Women's relay at the XXI Olympic Winter Games
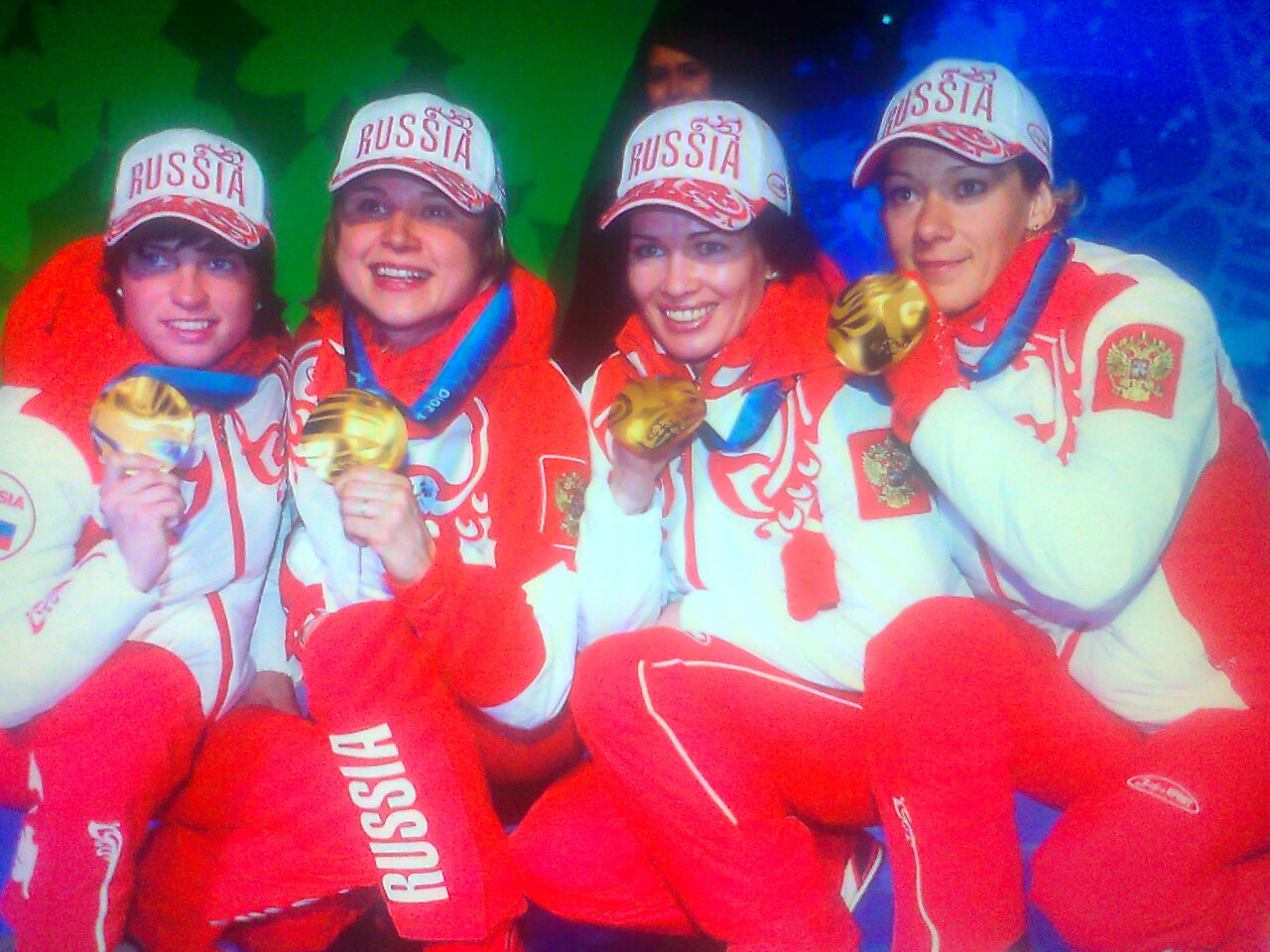
- Russian women's biathlon team with their gold medals
- Venue: Whistler Olympic Park
- Date: 23 February 2010
- Competitors: 19 teams from 19 nations
- Winning time: 1:09:36.3

Medalists
| 1st place, gold medalist(s) | | Svetlana Sleptsova; Anna Bogaliy-Titovets; Olga Medvedtseva; Olga Zaytseva | Russia |
| 2nd place, silver medalist(s) | | Marie-Laure Brunet; Sylvie Becaert; Marie Dorin; Sandrine Bailly | France |
| 3rd place, bronze medalist(s) | | Kati Wilhelm; Simone Hauswald; Martina Beck; Andrea Henkel | Germany |

The Women's 4 × 6 kilometre relay biathlon competition of the Vancouver 2010 Olympics was held at Whistler Olympic Park in Whistler, British Columbia on 23 February 2010. The race consisted of four laps of cross-country skiing, each lap a total of 6 km. Every 2 km there would be a shooting zone, the first one is prone and the second one is standing. Any misses in the shooting zones count as penalties which must be completed by going around a penalty loop right after the second shooting zone. There were four racers per team, each completing one lap. As all the teams started together, the team that crossed the finish line first would win.

== Results ==
The following are the results of the event.

| Rank | Bib | Country | Time | Penalties (P+S) | Deficit |
|---|---|---|---|---|---|
| 1st place, gold medalist(s) | 1 | Russia Svetlana Sleptsova; Anna Bogaliy-Titovets; Olga Medvedtseva; Olga Zaitseva | 1:09:36.3; 17:24.4; 17:17.3; 17:27.7; 17:26.9 | 0+2 0+3; 0+0 0+0; 0+1 0+1; 0+0 0+0; 0+1 0+2 | 0.0 |
| 2nd place, silver medalist(s) | 4 | France Marie-Laure Brunet; Sylvie Becaert; Marie Dorin; Sandrine Bailly | 1:10:09.1; 17:22.6; 17:17.6; 18:34.2; 16:54.7 | 2+4 0+4; 0+0 0+2; 0+0 0+1; 2+3 0+1; 0+1 0+0 | +32.8 |
| 3rd place, bronze medalist(s) | 2 | Germany Kati Wilhelm; Simone Hauswald; Martina Beck; Andrea Henkel | 1:10:13.4; 17:26.0; 17:16.2; 18:12.0; 17:19.2 | 0+2 0+3; 0+1 0+0; 0+0 0+0; 0+1 0+1; 0+0 0+2 | +37.1 |
| 4 | 5 | Norway Liv Kjersti Eikeland; Ann Kristin Flatland; Solveig Rogstad; Tora Berger | 1:10:34.1; 18:20.4; 16:52.6; 18:21.2; 16:59.9 | 0+1 0+2; 0+0 0+2; 0+0 0+0; 0+0 0+0; 0+1 0+0 | +57.8 |
| 5 | 3 | Sweden Elisabeth Högberg; Anna Carin Zidek; Anna Maria Nilsson; Helena Jonsson | 1:10:47.2; 17:46.7; 17:25.9; 18:16.8; 17:17.8 | 0+2 0+1; 0+0 0+1; 0+0 0+0; 0+2 0+0; 0+0 0+0 | +1:10.9 |
| 6 | 7 | Ukraine Olena Pidhrushna; Valj Semerenko; Oksana Khvostenko; Vita Semerenko | 1:11:08.2; 17:36.9; 17:56.3; 17:44.7; 17:50.3 | 0+2 0+6; 0+0 0+1; 0+1 0+3; 0+1 0+0; 0+0 0+2 | +1:31.9 |
| 7 | 8 | Belarus Liudmila Kalinchik; Darya Domracheva; Olga Kudrashova; Nadezhda Skardino | 1:11:34.0; 17:40.0; 17:28.7; 18:27.4; 17:57.9 | 0+1 0+2; 0+1 0+1; 0+0 0+1; 0+0 0+0; 0+0 0+0 | +1:57.7 |
| DSQ (8) | 12 | Slovenia Dijana Ravnikar; Andreja Mali; Tadeja Brankovič-Likozar; Teja Gregorin | 1:12:02.4; 17:50.4; 18:18.2; 18:07.8; 17:46.0 | 0+4 0+2; 0+0 0+1; 0+1 0+1; 0+2 0+0; 0+1 0+0 | +2:26.1 |
| 8 | 6 | China Wang Chunli; Liu Xianying; Kong Yingchao; Song Chaoqing | 1:12:16.9; 17:44.7; 17:47.7; 19:10.4; 17:34.1 | 0+2 0+6; 0+1 0+2; 0+1 0+1; 0+0 0+3; 0+0 0+0 | +2:40.6 |
| 9 | 10 | Romania Dana Plotogea; Éva Tófalvi; Mihaela Purdea; Réka Ferencz | 1:12:32.9; 18:10.6; 17:47.8; 18:23.2; 18:11.3 | 0+1 0+6; 0+0 0+1; 0+0 0+2; 0+1 0+3; 0+0 0+0 | +2:56.6 |
| 10 | 17 | Italy Michela Ponza; Katja Haller; Karin Oberhofer; Roberta Fiandino | 1:12:54.2; 18:20.5; 17:58.2; 18:19.3; 18:16.2 | 0+4 0+4; 0+1 0+1; 0+0 0+0; 0+0 0+2; 0+3 0+1 | +3:17.9 |
| 11 | 11 | Poland Krystyna Pałka; Magdalena Gwizdoń; Weronika Nowakowska-Ziemniak; Agnieszka Cyl | 1:12:54.3; 18:21.2; 19:10.2; 17:55.7; 17:27.2 | 0+5 1+7; 0+2 0+2; 0+3 1+3; 0+0 0+1; 0+0 0+1 | +3:18.0 |
| 12 | 15 | Slovakia Martina Halinárová; Anastasiya Kuzmina; Natália Prekopová; Jana Gereková | 1:13:15.8; 18:27.1; 17:09.3; 19:41.7; 17:57.7 | 0+2 1+9; 0+1 0+2; 0+0 0+1; 0+0 1+3; 0+1 0+3 | +3:39.5 |
| 13 | 9 | Kazakhstan Elena Khrustaleva; Anna Lebedeva; Lyubov Filimonova; Marina Lebedeva | 1:13:42.9; 17:42.1; 18:00.8; 18:52.6; 19:07.4 | 0+4 0+5; 0+0 0+1; 0+1 0+1; 0+1 0+2; 0+2 0+1 | +4:06.6 |
| 14 | 18 | Canada Megan Imrie; Zina Kocher; Rosanna Crawford; Megan Tandy | 1:14:25.5; 18:18.9; 18:04.9; 19:50.9; 18:10.8 | 1+7 0+5; 0+1 0+3; 0+2 0+1; 1+3 0+0; 0+1 0+1 | +4:49.2 |
| 15 | 14 | Czech Republic Veronika Vítková; Magda Rezlerová; Gabriela Soukalová; Zdeňka Vejnarová | 1:14:37.5; 17:51.1; 18:25.9; 18:23.7; 19:56.8 | 2+4 1+6; 0+1 0+1; 0+0 1+3; 0+0 0+1; 2+3 0+1 | +5:01.2 |
| 16 | 19 | United States Sara Studebaker; Lanny Barnes; Haley Johnson; Laura Spector | 1:15:47.5; 17:53.2; 18:52.5; 19:01.5; 20:00.3 | 1+8 0+4; 0+1 0+0; 0+1 0+1; 0+3 0+0; 1+3 0+3 | +6:11.2 |
| 17 | 16 | Estonia Kadri Lehtla; Eveli Saue; Sirli Hanni; Kristel Viigipuu | 1:17:55.5; 18:49.8; 18:15.4; 20:06.6; 20:43.7 | 2+9 0+7; 0+2 0+2; 0+1 0+1; 1+3 0+1; 1+3 0+3 | +8:19.2 |
| 18 | 13 | Latvia Žanna Juškāne; Madara Līduma; Līga Glāzere; Gerda Krūmiņa | 1:18:56.2; 21:06.7; 18:09.7; 20:51.6; 18:48.2 | 2+5 2+7; 2+3 0+2; 0+1 0+1; 0+0 2+3; 0+1 0+1 | +9:19.9 |

Teja Gregorin was the only competitor who failed the 2017 doping retests from the 2010 Winter Olympics. In October 2017, the International Biathlon Union said that her two samples tested positive for GHRP-2, a banned substance which stimulates the body to produce more growth hormone, in samples taken the week before competition started. She was disqualified in December 2017.
