= Natália Prekopová =

Slovak biathlete (born 1989)

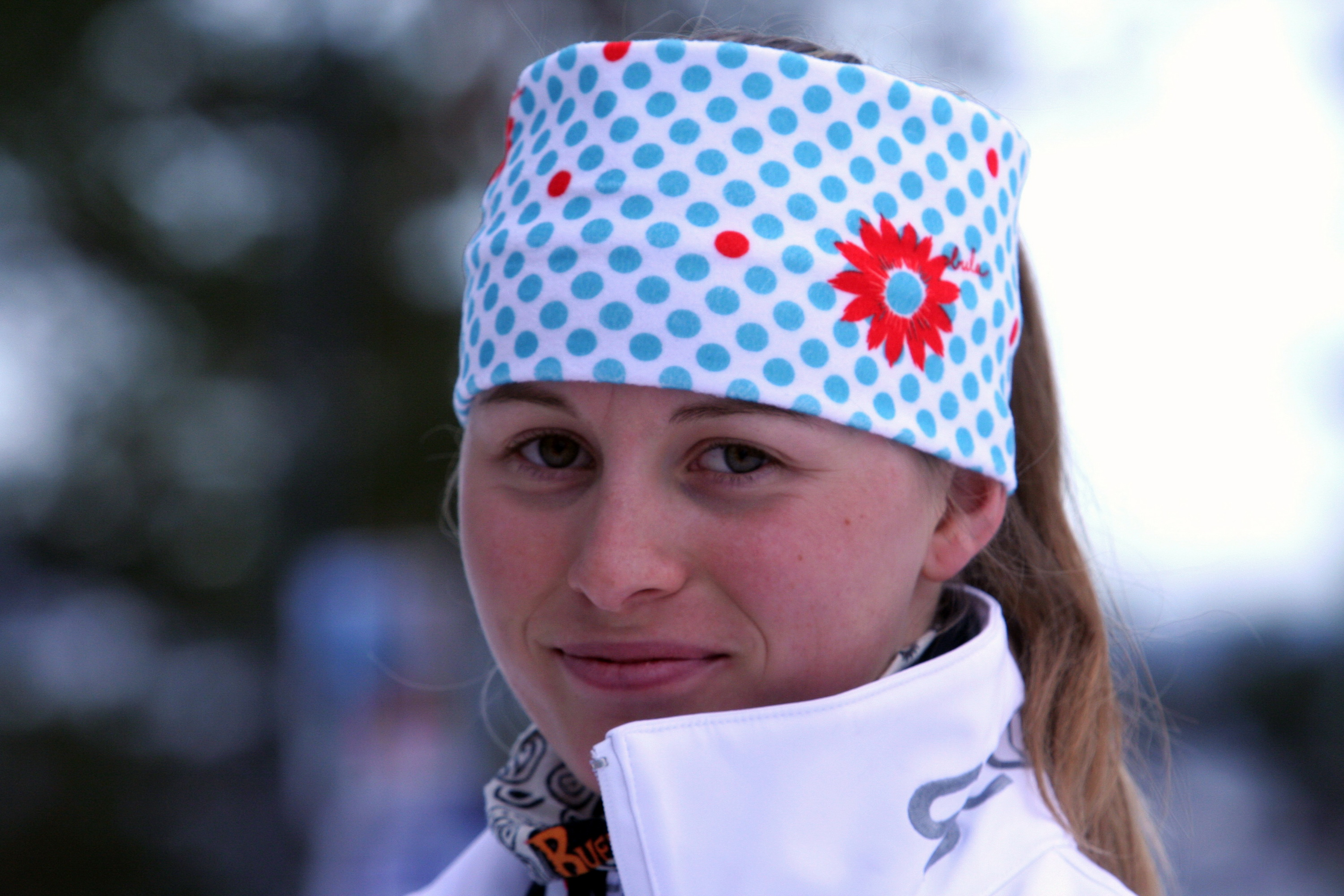
- Natalia Prekopova in Oslo in 2010

Personal information
- Full name: Natália Prekopová
- Born: 31 May 1989 (age 37) Ilava, Czechoslovakia (present day Slovakia)

Sport

Professional information
- Sport: Biathlon
- Club: VŠC Dukla Banská Bystrica
- World Cup debut: 12 December 2008

Olympic Games
- Teams: 1 (2010)
- Medals: 0

World Championships
- Teams: 2 (2009, 2011)
- Medals: 0

World Cup
- Seasons: 8 (2008/09–2015/16)
- All victories: 0
- All podiums: 0
Medal record
Women's biathlon
Representing Slovakia
Summer European Championships
Bronze medal – third place	2010 Brezno-Osrblie	Mixed relay
Youth World Championships
Bronze medal – third place	2008 Ruhpolding	10 km individual

Natália Prekopová (born 31 May 1989) is a former Slovak biathlete.

== Career ==
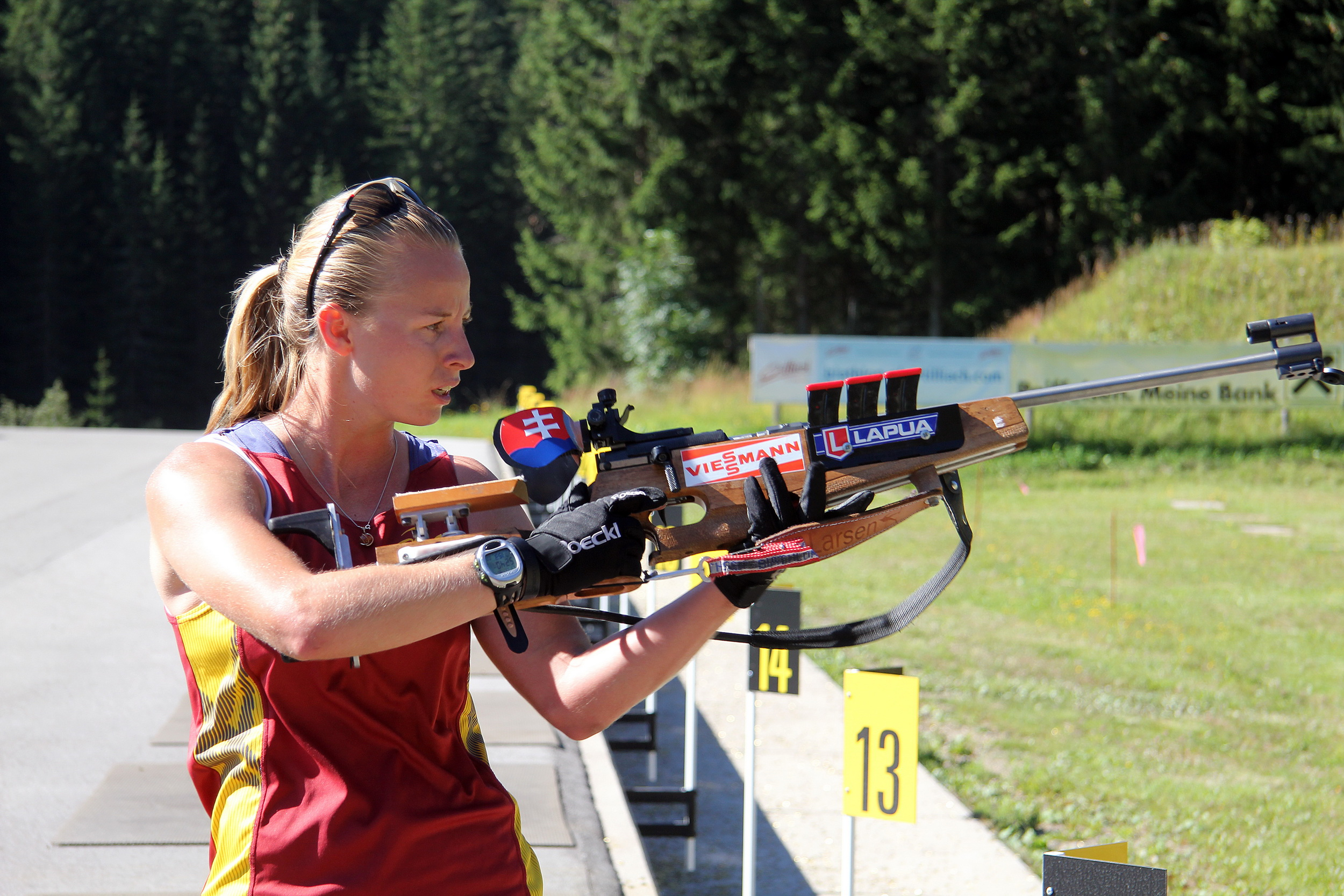
Prekopova training in Obertilliach in 2012

Prekopová competed in the 2010 Winter Olympics for Slovakia. She finished 13th as a part of the Slovakian women's relay team.

As of February 2013, her best performance at the Biathlon World Championships is 13th, as part of the Slovakian women's relay team, in 2009. Her best individual result at the Biathlon World Championships is 68th, in the 2009 sprint.

As of February 2013, Prekopová's best result at a Biathlon World Cup event is 9th, achieved twice with the Slovakian women's relay team and mixed relay teams. Her best individual performance in a Biathlon World Cup event is 56th, in the sprint at Kontiolahti in 2009/10.

Prekopová retired from biathlon after the end of the 2015–16 season.
