= Biathlon at the 2010 Winter Olympics – Women's individual =

Women's individual at the XXI Olympic Winter Games
- Pictogram for biathlon
- Venue: Whistler Olympic Park
- Date: 18 February 2010
- Competitors: 87 from 31 nations
- Winning time: 40:52.8

Medalists
1st place, gold medalist(s)		Tora Berger	Norway
2nd place, silver medalist(s)		Elena Khrustaleva	Kazakhstan
3rd place, bronze medalist(s)		Darya Domracheva	Belarus

The Women's 15 kilometre individual biathlon competition of the Vancouver 2010 Olympics was held at Whistler Olympic Park in Whistler, British Columbia on 18 February 2010.

== Results ==
Rank	Bib	Name	Country	Time	Penalties (P+S+P+S)	Deficit
1st place, gold medalist(s)	2	Tora Berger	Norway	40:52.8	1 (0+0+0+1)	
2nd place, silver medalist(s)	7	Elena Khrustaleva	Kazakhstan	41:13.5	0 (0+0+0+0)	+20.7
3rd place, bronze medalist(s)	34	Darya Domracheva	Belarus	41:21.0	1 (0+1+0+0)	+28.2
4	52	Kati Wilhelm	Germany	41:57.3	1 (0+0+1+0)	+1:04.5
5	71	Weronika Nowakowska	Poland	41:57.5	1 (0+0+0+1)	+1:04.7
6	26	Andrea Henkel	Germany	42:32.4	2 (0+0+1+1)	+1:39.6
7	15	Agnieszka Cyl	Poland	42:32.5	1 (0+1+0+0)	+1:39.7
8	3	Oksana Khvostenko	Ukraine	42:38.6	0 (0+0+0+0)	+1:45.8
9	53	Liudmila Kalinchik	Belarus	42:39.1	1 (0+1+0+0)	+1:46.3
10	18	Magdalena Neuner	Germany	42:42.1	3 (1+2+0+0)	+1:49.3
11	14	Éva Tófalvi	Romania	42:43.4	1 (0+0+0+1)	+1:50.6
12	8	Marie-Laure Brunet	France	42:44.4	2 (0+1+0+1)	+1:51.6
13	62	Valj Semerenko	Ukraine	42:44.5	1 (0+0+0+1)	+1:51.7
14	35	Ann Kristin Flatland	Norway	43:06.4	2 (0+1+1+0)	+2:13.6
15	51	Krystyna Pałka	Poland	43:09.6	1 (0+1+0+0)	+2:16.8
16	81	Olga Kudrashova	Belarus	43:11.3	0 (0+0+0+0)	+2:18.5
17	11	Anna Carin Olofsson-Zidek	Sweden	43:12.1	2 (1+0+0+1)	+2:19.3
18	40	Katja Haller	Italy	43:12.4	0 (0+0+0+0)	+2:19.6
19	9	Andreja Mali	Slovenia	43:14.4	0 (0+0+0+0)	+2:21.6
20	31	Liu Xianying	China	43:16.2	2 (1+0+0+1)	+2:23.4
21	49	Olga Medvedtseva	Russia	43:25.9	2 (2+0+0+0)	+2:33.1
22	78	Vita Semerenko	Ukraine	43:30.8	2 (1+0+0+1)	+2:38.0
23	66	Lanny Barnes	United States	43:31.8	0 (0+0+0+0)	+2:39.0
24	38	Anna Maria Nilsson	Sweden	43:44.0	1 (1+0+0+0)	+2:51.2
25	16	Anna Bogaliy-Titovets	Russia	43:46.3	3 (1+0+1+1)	+2:53.5
26	4	Olga Zaitseva	Russia	43:46.8	3 (2+1+0+0)	+2:54.0
27	22	Michela Ponza	Italy	43:54.4	1 (0+0+0+1)	+3:01.6
28	63	Nadezhda Skardino	Belarus	44:09.4	1 (0+0+1+0)	+3:16.6
29	54	Martina Beck	Germany	44:12.0	2 (0+2+0+0)	+3:19.2
30	86	Sylvie Becaert	France	44:13.2	3 (1+1+1+0)	+3:20.4
30	33	Diana Rasimovičiūtė	Lithuania	44:13.2	3 (1+0+1+1)	+3:20.4
32	46	Olena Pidhrushna	Ukraine	44:15.9	2 (0+2+0+0)	+3:23.1
33	37	Wang Chunli	China	44:18.0	3 (0+2+0+1)	+3:25.2
34	1	Sara Studebaker	United States	44:27.3	1 (0+0+1+0)	+3:34.5
35	41	Dijana Ravnikar	Slovenia	44:27.4	2 (1+0+0+1)	+3:34.6
DSQ (36)	28	Teja Gregorin	Slovenia	44:29.1	3 (0+1+0+2)	+3:36.3
36	13	Natalia Levchenkova	Moldova	44:34.9	2 (0+1+1+0)	+3:42.1
37	36	Anna Lebedeva	Kazakhstan	44:36.3	2 (0+0+0+2)	+3:43.5
38	27	Anastasiya Kuzmina	Slovakia	45:16.0	5 (2+1+1+1)	+4:23.2
39	17	Selina Gasparin	Switzerland	45:23.6	3 (0+1+0+2)	+4:30.8
40	68	Mihaela Purdea	Romania	45:27.7	3 (0+2+0+1)	+4:34.9
41	5	Eveli Saue	Estonia	45:27.9	2 (1+0+0+1)	+4:35.1
42	42	Mari Laukkanen	Finland	45:36.4	3 (1+0+1+1)	+4:43.6
43	73	Martina Halinárová	Slovakia	45:38.7	3 (0+1+0+2)	+4:45.9
44	45	Kadri Lehtla	Estonia	45:43.0	2 (1+0+1+0)	+4:50.2
45	30	Kaisa Mäkäräinen	Finland	45:46.4	4 (2+1+1+0)	+4:53.6
45	50	Jana Gerekova	Slovakia	45:46.4	4 (1+0+1+2)	+4:53.6
47	10	Nina Klenovska	Bulgaria	45:49.8	3 (0+1+1+1)	+4:57.0
48	6	Helena Jonsson	Sweden	45:52.9	4 (1+2+0+1)	+5:00.1
49	44	Megan Tandy	Canada	46:04.3	3 (1+1+0+1)	+5:11.5
50	70	Marie Dorin	France	46:17.7	4 (2+1+0+1)	+5:24.9
51	43	Sandrine Bailly	France	46:28.8	5 (1+0+3+1)	+5:36.0
52	58	Song Chaoqing	China	46:30.3	4 (1+1+0+2)	+5:37.5
52	12	Fuyuko Suzuki	Japan	46:30.3	3 (1+1+0+1)	+5:37.5
54	59	Zdenka Vejnarova	Czech Republic	46:38.0	4 (2+1+1+0)	+5:45.2
55	57	Iana Romanova	Russia	46:41.0	4 (1+0+2+1)	+5:48.2
56	64	Lyubov Filimonova	Kazakhstan	46:45.4	3 (0+1+1+1)	+5:52.6
57	83	Kong Yingchao	China	46:46.2	4 (0+2+1+1)	+5:53.4
58	74	Magdalena Gwizdon	Poland	46:46.7	4 (0+3+1+0)	+5:53.9
59	84	Gabriela Soukalová	Czech Republic	46:49.8	2 (1+0+0+1)	+5:57.0
60	82	Solveig Rogstad	Norway	46:55.1	4 (2+1+0+1)	+6:02.3
61	69	Megan Imrie	Canada	47:05.8	4 (2+1+0+1)	+6:13.0
62	60	Tadeja Brankovič-Likozar	Slovenia	47:09.5	4 (1+1+2+0)	+6:16.7
63	56	Magda Rezlerova	Czech Republic	47:13.1	5 (0+3+1+1)	+6:20.3
64	77	Laura Spector	United States	47:19.3	2 (0+0+0+2)	+6:26.5
65	39	Haley Johnson	United States	47:19.4	4 (2+1+0+1)	+6:26.6
66	25	Madara Līduma	Latvia	47:30.2	6 (0+3+1+2)	+6:37.4
67	21	Veronika Vítková	Czech Republic	47:33.4	4 (0+2+1+1)	+6:40.6
68	47	Gerda Krumina	Latvia	48:00.1	4 (0+3+1+0)	+7:07.3
69	67	Liv Kjersti Eikeland	Norway	48:00.7	5 (0+1+1+3)	+7:07.9
70	79	Marina Lebedeva	Kazakhstan	48:04.9	3 (0+0+2+1)	+7:12.1
71	32	Zina Kocher	Canada	48:19.3	6 (1+0+0+5)	+7:26.5
72	19	Mun Ji-Hee	South Korea	48:53.9	5 (0+0+2+3)	+8:01.1
73	87	Reka Ferencz	Romania	48:54.9	4 (2+0+1+1)	+8:02.1
74	61	Karin Oberhofer	Italy	49:18.6	7 (0+1+2+4)	+8:25.8
75	85	Rosanna Crawford	Canada	49:22.1	4 (1+2+0+1)	+8:29.3
76	72	Elisabeth Högberg	Sweden	49:46.5	4 (1+1+0+2)	+8:53.7
77	65	Liga Glazere	Latvia	50:20.3	5 (3+0+1+1)	+9:27.5
78	80	Christa Perathoner	Italy	50:23.3	5 (1+1+1+2)	+9:30.5
79	75	Lubomira Kalinova	Slovakia	50:38.7	7 (2+0+2+3)	+9:45.9
80	55	Dana Plotogea	Romania	51:01.1	7 (1+3+1+2)	+10:08.3
81	48	Sarah Murphy	New Zealand	52:54.9	6 (1+2+0+3)	+12:02.1
82	20	Andrijana Stipaničić	Croatia	53:06.1	5 (1+3+0+1)	+12:13.3
83	76	Zanna Juskane	Latvia	53:36.4	7 (3+1+1+2)	+12:43.6
84	23	Panagiota Tsakiri	Greece	54:36.3	7 (1+2+1+3)	+13:43.5
85	24	Victoria Padial Hernandez	Spain	56:41.8	8 (1+4+0+3)	+15:49.0
	29	Tanja Karišik	Bosnia and Herzegovina	DNF	4 (1+1+2+ )	

Teja Gregorin was the only competitor who failed the 2017 doping retests from the 2010 Winter Olympics. In October 2017, the International Biathlon Union said that her two samples tested positive for GHRP-2, a banned substance which stimulates the body to produce more growth hormone, in samples taken the week before competition started. She was disqualified in December 2017.

== See also ==
- Biathlon at the 2010 Winter Paralympics – Women's individual
