= Biathlon at the 2010 Winter Olympics – Women's pursuit =

Women's pursuit at the XXI Olympic Winter Games
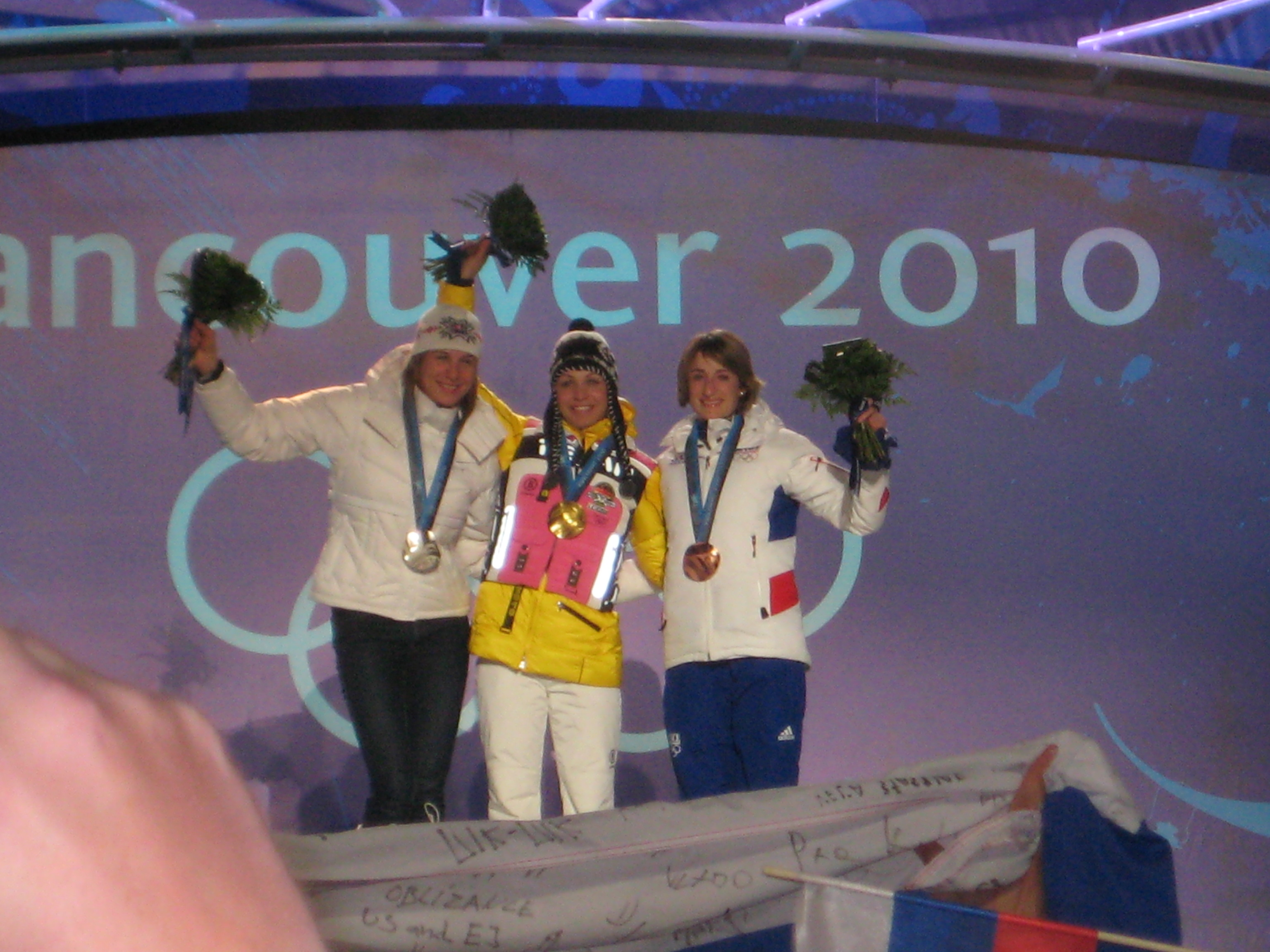
- The medalists for the event. From left: Anastasiya Kuzmina (silver), Magdalena Neuner (gold) and Marie-Laure Brunet (bronze)
- Venue: Whistler Olympic Park
- Date: 16 February 2010
- Competitors: 60 from 24 nations
- Winning time: 30:16.0

Medalists
1st place, gold medalist(s)		Magdalena Neuner	Germany
2nd place, silver medalist(s)		Anastasiya Kuzmina	Slovakia
3rd place, bronze medalist(s)		Marie-Laure Brunet	France

The women's 10 kilometre pursuit biathlon competition of the Vancouver 2010 Olympics was held at Whistler Olympic Park in Whistler, British Columbia on 16 February 2010.

Observers and participants reported that the race start was confused and disorganized. U.S. coach Per Nilsson stated that he had never seen an Olympic biathlon as poorly managed as the 16 February women's race.

== Results ==
Rank	Bib	Name	Country	Start.	Time	Penalties (P+P+S+S)	Deficit
1st place, gold medalist(s)	2	Magdalena Neuner	Germany	0:02	30:16.0	2 (0+0+1+1)	0.00
2nd place, silver medalist(s)	1	Anastasiya Kuzmina	Slovakia	0:00	30:28.3	2 (0+1+1+0)	+12.3
3rd place, bronze medalist(s)	6	Marie-Laure Brunet	France	0:28	30:44.3	0 (0+0+0+0)	+28.3
4	20	Anna Carin Zidek	Sweden	0:58	30:55.4	1 (1+0+0+0)	+39.4
5	33	Tora Berger	Norway	1:46	31:07.2	0 (0+0+0+0)	+51.2
6	4	Anna Boulygina	Russia	0:12	31:08.1	1 (0+1+0+0)	+52.1
7	7	Olga Zaytseva	Russia	0:28	31:20.3	2 (0+1+1+0)	+1:04.3
8	10	Ann Kristin Flatland	Norway	0:34	31:33.3	1 (1+0+0+0)	+1:17.3
DSQ (9)	9	Teja Gregorin	Slovenia	0:34	31:38.6	2 (0+0+1+1)	+1:22.6
9	27	Andrea Henkel	Germany	1:20	31:40.5	3 (1+0+1+1)	+1:24.5
10	5	Elena Khrustaleva	Kazakhstan	0:25	31:42.1	3 (1+0+1+1)	+1:26.1
11	30	Kati Wilhelm	Germany	1:32	31:43.3	1 (0+0+0+1)	+1:27.3
12	17	Liudmila Kalinchik	Belarus	0:51	31:48.2	2 (0+0+1+1)	+1:32.2
13	12	Helena Jonsson	Sweden	0:47	31:53.8	2 (0+0+2+0)	+1:37.8
14	8	Darya Domracheva	Belarus	0:32	31:57.2	4 (0+2+0+2)	+1:41.2
15	26	Simone Hauswald	Germany	1:19	31:58.6	4 (1+0+1+2)	+1:42.6
16	3	Marie Dorin	France	0:11	32:03.2	2 (0+1+0+1)	+1:47.2
17	13	Svetlana Sleptsova	Russia	0:48	32:06.9	3 (1+0+0+2)	+1:50.9
18	14	Éva Tófalvi	Romania	0:50	32:26.3	2 (0+1+0+1)	+2:10.3
19	22	Olga Medvedtseva	Russia	1:06	32:31.9	3 (0+0+2+1)	+2:15.9
20	18	Olena Pidhrushna	Ukraine	0:52	32:34.0	2 (1+0+0+1)	+2:18.0
21	11	Oksana Khvostenko	Ukraine	0:43	32:54.3	1 (0+0+1+0)	+2:38.3
22	23	Valj Semerenko	Ukraine	1:13	32:57.6	3 (0+1+2+0)	+2:41.6
23	21	Krystyna Pałka	Poland	0:59	33:07.6	2 (1+0+1+0)	+2:51.6
24	42	Agnieszka Cyl	Poland	2:00	33:08.4	1 (1+0+0+0)	+2:52.4
25	28	Nadezhda Skardino	Belarus	1:22	33:11.0	2 (0+0+1+1)	+2:55.0
26	15	Sandrine Bailly	France	0:50	33:15.0	5 (1+0+1+3)	+2:59.0
27	36	Weronika Nowakowska	Poland	1:54	33:24.2	2 (0+0+1+1)	+3:08.2
28	29	Sylvie Becaert	France	1:26	33:34.8	3 (1+0+2+0)	+3:18.8
29	51	Liu Xianying	China	2:19	33:41.2	2 (0+0+1+1)	+3:25.2
30	35	Magdalena Gwizdoń	Poland	1:53	33:45.8	2 (0+1+1+0)	+3:29.8
31	19	Magda Rezlerová	Czech Republic	0:55	33:46.9	5 (0+0+1+4)	+3:30.9
32	31	Andreja Mali	Slovenia	1:37	33:53.9	2 (1+0+1+0)	+3:37.9
33	25	Diana Rasimovičiūtė	Lithuania	1:16	33:58.4	5 (0+0+3+2)	+3:42.4
34	50	Wang Chunli	China	2:18	34:01.8	2 (0+0+0+2)	+3:45.8
35	46	Megan Tandy	Canada	2:12	34:02.2	1 (1+0+0+0)	+3:46.2
36	24	Veronika Vítková	Czech Republic	1:15	34:02.5	3 (1+0+1+1)	+3:46.5
37	57	Madara Līduma	Latvia	2:28	34:02.6	3 (0+0+2+1)	+3:46.6
38	37	Dijana Ravnikar	Slovenia	1:54	34:02.7	1 (0+0+1+0)	+3:46.7
39	40	Jana Gerekova	Slovakia	1:58	34:20.1	4 (0+3+0+1)	+4:04.1
40	41	Sofia Domeij	Sweden	1:59	34:23.8	2 (1+0+0+1)	+4:07.8
41	34	Vita Semerenko	Ukraine	1:47	34:26.4	5 (2+0+1+2)	+4:10.4
42	32	Song Chaoqing	China	1:43	34:46.6	5 (1+2+0+2)	+4:30.6
43	52	Anna Lebedeva	Kazakhstan	2:20	34:49.8	2 (0+1+0+1)	+4:33.8
44	59	Kaisa Mäkäräinen	Finland	2:32	34:50.0	2 (0+1+1+0)	+4:34.0
45	45	Sara Studebaker	United States	2:10	35:00.1	2 (1+0+0+1)	+4:44.1
46	16	Anna Maria Nilsson	Sweden	0:50	35:16.9	6 (1+2+2+1)	+5:00.9
47	56	Selina Gasparin	Switzerland	2:28	35:53.5	5 (2+1+1+1)	+5:37.5
48	39	Mihaela Purdea	Romania	1:57	36:08.5	4 (1+0+0+3)	+5:52.5
49	43	Michela Ponza	Italy	2:00	36:11.9	1 (0+1+0+0)	+5:55.9
50	38	Katja Haller	Italy	1:55	36:20.9	5 (1+2+2+0)	+6:04.9
51	49	Dana Plotogea	Romania	2:17	36:38.8	3 (0+0+2+1)	+6:22.8
52	47	Karin Oberhofer	Italy	2:13	36:40.3	6 (2+3+1+0)	+6:24.3
53	44	Fuyuko Suzuki	Japan	2:02	36:41.9	1 (0+0+0+1)	+6:25.9
54	60	Zdeňka Vejnarová	Czech Republic	2:33	37:30.6	6 (1+1+3+1)	+7:14.6
55	53	Natalia Levchenkova	Moldova	2:23	37:38.5	4 (1+0+0+3)	+7:22.5
56	48	Gerda Krumina	Latvia	2:14	37:58.7	4 (0+2+1+1)	+7:42.7
	55	Eveli Saue	Estonia	2:28	LAP	7 (1+2+4+ )	
	58	Marina Lebedeva	Kazakhstan	2:31	LAP	5 (1+2+2+ )	
	54	Martina Halinarova	Slovakia	2:23	LAP	6 (1+2+3+ )	

Teja Gregorin was the only competitor who failed the 2017 doping retests from the 2010 Winter Olympics. In October 2017, the International Biathlon Union said that her two samples tested positive for GHRP-2, a banned substance which stimulates the body to produce more growth hormone, in samples taken the week before competition started. She was disqualified in December 2017.

== See also ==
- Biathlon at the 2010 Winter Paralympics – Women's pursuit
