= Biathlon at the 2010 Winter Olympics – Women's sprint =

Women's sprint at the XXI Olympic Winter Games
- Pictogram for biathlon
- Venue: Whistler Olympic Park
- Date: 13 February 2010
- Competitors: 89 from 31 nations
- Winning time: 19:55.6

Medalists
1st place, gold medalist(s)		Anastasiya Kuzmina	Slovakia
2nd place, silver medalist(s)		Magdalena Neuner	Germany
3rd place, bronze medalist(s)		Marie Dorin	France

The Women's 7.5 kilometre sprint biathlon competition of the Vancouver 2010 Olympics was held at Whistler Olympic Park in Whistler, British Columbia on 13 February 2010. This competition started at 1:00 p.m. PST.

== Results ==
Rank	Bib	Name	Country	Time	Penalties (P+S)	Deficit
1st place, gold medalist(s)	19	Anastasiya Kuzmina	Slovakia	19:55.6	1 (1+0)	
2nd place, silver medalist(s)	31	Magdalena Neuner	Germany	19:57.1	1 (0+1)	+1.5
3rd place, bronze medalist(s)	10	Marie Dorin	France	20:06.5	0 (0+0)	+10.9
4	47	Anna Boulygina	Russia	20:07.5	0 (0+0)	+12.1
5	29	Elena Khrustaleva	Kazakhstan	20:20.4	0 (0+0)	+24.8
6	67	Marie-Laure Brunet	France	20:23.3	0 (0+0)	+27.7
7	25	Olga Zaytseva	Russia	20:23.4	0 (0+0)	+27.8
8	37	Darya Domracheva	Belarus	20:27.4	0 (0+0)	+31.8
DSQ (9)	44	Teja Gregorin	Slovenia	20:29.2	0 (0+0)	+33.6
9	63	Ann Kristin Aafedt Flatland	Norway	20:29.7	1 (0+1)	+34.1
10	60	Oksana Khvostenko	Ukraine	20:38.9	0 (0+0)	+43.3
11	50	Helena Jonsson	Sweden	20:42.5	0 (0+0)	+46.9
12	15	Svetlana Sleptsova	Russia	20:43.1	0 (0+0)	+47.5
13	27	Éva Tófalvi	Romania	20:45.1	0 (0+0)	+49.5
14	28	Sandrine Bailly	France	20:45.3	2 (1+1)	+49.7
15	71	Anna Maria Nilsson	Sweden	20:45.5	0 (0+0)	+49.9
16	70	Liudmila Kalinchik	Belarus	20:46.1	0 (0+0)	+50.5
17	75	Olena Pidhrushna	Ukraine	20:47.3	1 (0+1)	+51.7
18	18	Magda Rezlerová	Czech Republic	20:51.0	0 (0+0)	+55.4
19	43	Anna Carin Olofsson-Zidek	Sweden	20:53.5	1 (1+0)	+57.9
20	81	Krystyna Pałka	Poland	20:54.3	0 (0+0)	+58.7
21	49	Olga Medvedtseva	Russia	21:01.6	1 (1+0)	+1:06.0
22	32	Valj Semerenko	Ukraine	21:08.3	0 (0+2)	+1:12.7
23	58	Veronika Vítková	Czech Republic	21:10.9	0 (0+0)	+1:15.3
24	21	Diana Rasimovičiūtė	Lithuania	21:11.2	2 (1+1)	+1:15.6
25	11	Simone Hauswald	Germany	21:14.1	2 (1+1)	+1:18.5
26	56	Andrea Henkel	Germany	21:15.7	2 (1+1)	+1:20.1
27	84	Nadezhda Skardino	Belarus	21:17.6	0 (0+0)	+1:22.0
28	89	Sylvie Becaert	France	21:21.6	2 (1+1)	+1:26.0
29	38	Kati Wilhelm	Germany	21:27.2	3 (2+1)	+1:31.6
30	20	Andreja Mali	Slovenia	21:32.6	0 (0+0)	+1:37.0
31	86	Song Chaoqing	China	21:38.2	2 (1+1)	+1:42.6
32	45	Tora Berger	Norway	21:42.1	2 (1+1)	+1:46.5
33	13	Vita Semerenko	Ukraine	21:42.3	3 (0+3)	+1:46.7
34	73	Magdalena Gwizdoń	Poland	21:48.9	0 (0+2)	+1:53.3
35	26	Weronika Nowakowska	Poland	21:49.4	3 (0+3)	+1:53.8
36	41	Dijana Ravnikar	Slovenia	21:49.7	1 (0+1)	+1:54.1
37	59	Katja Haller	Italy	21:51.0	1 (0+1)	+1:55.4
38	87	Mihaela Purdea	Romania	21:52.2	1 (0+1)	+1:56.6
39	66	Jana Gerekova	Slovakia	21:54.0	3 (1+2)	+1:58.4
40	12	Sofia Domeij	Sweden	21:55.0	1 (0+1)	+1:59.4
41	54	Agnieszka Cyl	Poland	21:55.2	0 (0+2)	+1:59.6
42	46	Michela Ponza	Italy	21:55.7	2 (1+1)	+2:00.1
43	51	Fuyuko Suzuki	Japan	21:58.0	1 (1+0)	+2:02.4
44	65	Sara Studebaker	United States	22:05.3	1 (0+1)	+2:09.7
45	76	Megan Tandy	Canada	22:07.7	0 (0+0)	+2:12.1
46	5	Karin Oberhofer	Italy	22:08.9	3 (1+2)	+2:13.3
47	80	Gerda Krumina	Latvia	22:09.3	1 (0+1)	+2:13.7
48	62	Dana Plotogea	Romania	22:12.3	0 (0+2)	+2:16.7
49	74	Wang Chunli	China	22:13.4	3 (3+0)	+2:17.8
50	39	Liu Xianying	China	22:14.6	3 (1+2)	+2:19.0
51	24	Anna Lebedeva	Kazakhstan	22:15.1	0 (0+2)	+2:19.5
52	3	Natalia Levchenkova	Moldova	22:18.2	2 (1+1)	+2:22.6
53	35	Martina Halinarova	Slovakia	22:19.0	2 (1+1)	+2:23.4
54	68	Eveli Saue	Estonia	22:23.3	2 (1+1)	+2:27.7
55	57	Selina Gasparin	Switzerland	22:23.4	4 (2+2)	+2:27.8
56	16	Madara Līduma	Latvia	22:23.8	4 (2+2)	+2:28.2
57	85	Marina Lebedeva	Kazakhstan	22:27.0	1 (0+1)	+2:31.4
58	69	Kaisa Mäkäräinen	Finland	22:27.3	3 (0+3)	+2:31.7
59	53	Zdeňka Vejnarová	Czech Republic	22:28.5	2 (1+1)	+2:32.9
60	6	Kong Yingchao	China	22:30.9	2 (1+1)	+2:35.3
61	7	Nina Klenovska	Bulgaria	22:32.4	3 (1+2)	+2:36.8
62	17	Mun Ji-Hee	South Korea	22:34.1	2 (1+1)	+2:38.5
63	48	Kadri Lehtla	Estonia	22:34.2	2 (2+0)	+2:38.6
64	64	Zina Kocher	Canada	22:35.8	3 (1+2)	+2:40.2
65	83	Gro Kristiansen	Norway	22:41.0	5 (3+2)	+2:45.4
66	61	Lyubov Filimonova	Kazakhstan	22:44.4	2 (1+1)	+2:48.8
67	52	Mari Laukkanen	Finland	22:45.0	4 (3+1)	+2:49.4
68	36	Liga Glazere	Latvia	22:47.7	1 (0+1)	+2:52.1
69	23	Liv Kjersti Eikeland	Norway	22:51.9	4 (1+3)	+2:56.3
70	77	Veronika Zvařičová	Czech Republic	22:52.9	0 (0+2)	+2:57.3
71	22	Rosanna Crawford	Canada	23:04.6	0 (0+0)	+3:09.0
72	78	Roberta Fiandino	Italy	23:11.6	4 (3+1)	+3:16.0
73	1	Olga Nazarova	Belarus	23:11.7	3 (0+3)	+3:16.1
74	55	Tadeja Brankovič-Likozar	Slovenia	23:13.3	4 (1+3)	+3:17.7
75	30	Megan Imrie	Canada	23:17.0	3 (1+2)	+3:21.4
76	9	Laura Spector	United States	23:18.1	2 (1+1)	+3:22.5
77	82	Lanny Barnes	United States	23:26.0	1 (1+0)	+3:30.4
78	72	Zanna Juskane	Latvia	23:32.4	3 (1+2)	+3:36.8
79	33	Haley Johnson	United States	23:35.4	4 (1+3)	+3:39.8
80	79	Lubomira Kalinova	Slovakia	23:47.2	5 (3+2)	+3:51.6
81	34	Sarah Murphy	New Zealand	23:49.7	3 (2+1)	+3:54.1
82	2	Kristel Viigipuu	Estonia	23:57.1	0 (0+2)	+4:01.5
83	88	Sirli Hanni	Estonia	23:57.8	2 (2+0)	+4:02.2
84	4	Alexandra Stoian	Romania	24:04.6	4 (3+1)	+4:09.0
85	40	Panagiota Tsakiri	Greece	24:28.8	3 (1+2)	+4:33.2
86	42	Victoria Padial Hernandez	Spain	24:55.5	2 (1+1)	+4:59.9
87	8	Tanja Karišik	Bosnia and Herzegovina	25:24.1	2 (2+0)	+5:28.5
—	14	Andrijana Stipaničić	Croatia	DNS		

Teja Gregorin was the only competitor who failed the 2017 doping retests from the 2010 Winter Olympics. In October 2017, the International Biathlon Union said that her two samples tested positive for GHRP-2, a banned substance which stimulates the body to produce more growth hormone, in samples taken the week before competition started. She was disqualified in December 2017.
