= Roberta Fiandino =

Italian biathlete (born 1985)

Personal information
- Born: October 17, 1985 Cuneo, Italy

Sport
- Sport: Skiing
- Updated on March 2, 2013

Roberta Fiandino (born October 17, 1985 in Cuneo) is a retired Italian biathlete.

Fiandino competed in the 2010 Winter Olympics for Italy. She finished 11th as a part of the Italian women's relay team, and 73rd in the sprint.

As of February 2013, her best performance at the Biathlon World Championships is 5th, as part of the Italian mixed relay team, in 2008. Her best individual result at the Biathlon World Championships is 25th, in the 2008 and 2011 individual races.

As of February 2013, Fiandino's best result at a Biathlon World Cup event is 5th, with the Italian women's relay team at Antholz in 2010/11. Her best individual performance in a Biathlon World Cup event is 16th, in the sprint at Antholz in 2008/09. Her best overall finish in the Biathlon World Cup is 61st, in 2008/09.
