= Žanna Juškāne =

Latvian biathlete (born 1989)

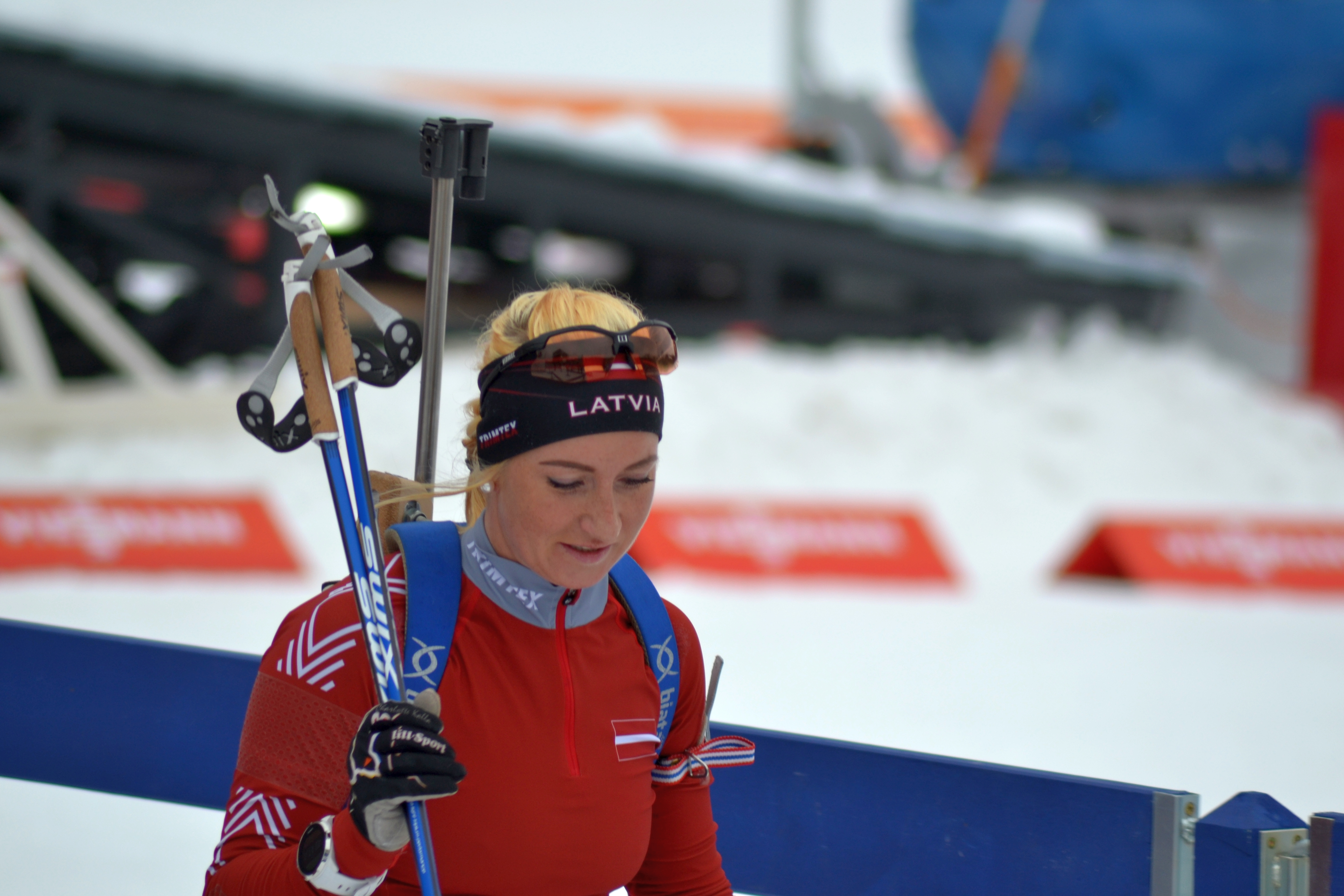

Personal information
- Born: 5 October 1989 (age 36) Rēzekne, Latvian SSR, Soviet Union

Sport
- Sport: Skiing
- Updated on February 28, 2013

Žanna Juškāne (born 5 October 1989 in Rēzekne) is a Latvian biathlete.

Juškāne competed in the 2010 Winter Olympics for Latvia. Her best finish was 19th, as part of the Latvian relay team. Her best individual showing was 79th, in the sprint. She also placed 84th in the individual.

As of February 2013, her best performance at the Biathlon World Championships is 18th, as part of the 2011 Latvian mixed relay team. Her best individual performance is 72nd, in the 2012 sprint.

As of February 2013, Juškāne's best performance in the Biathlon World Cup is 10th, as part of the women's relay team at Oberhof in 2007/08. Her best individual result is 56th, in an individual race at Östersund in 2012/13.
