= Sonya Erasmus =

Canadian biathlete

Sonya Erasmus Zurevinski (born September 13, 1984) is a Canadian former biathlete.

Erasmus won her first international biathlon races at the Biathlon World Junior Championships 2002 in Ridnaun. In the single, she finished 52nd and 53rd in the sprint.

In 2003, in Kościelisko, she ranked 51st in the single 51st and 47th in the sprint, 48th in the pursuit 48th. She ranked 13th for the season. She was awarded the BC Premier's Athletics Award in 2003.

In 2007, she was on the Canadian team that ranked 14th at the worlds.

Her husband is David Zurevinski, a national level biathlete. Erasmus coaches biathlon in Vanderhoof, British Columbia
