= Anna Lebedeva =

Kazakhstani biathlete (born 1981)

Personal information
- Full name: Anna Petrovna Lebedeva
- Born: December 26, 1981 (age 44) Alekseevka (Akkol), Kazakh SSR, Soviet Union
- Height: 178 cm (5 ft 10 in)

Sport
- Sport: Skiing
- Updated on December 01, 2023

Anna Petrovna Lebedeva (Kazakh: Анна Петровна Лебедева, born December 26, 1981, in Alekseevka) is a Kazakh biathlete.

Lebedeva competed in the 2006 and 2010 Winter Olympics for Kazakhstan. Her best performance was 14th as part of the 2010 Kazakh relay team. Her best individual finish was 38th, in the 2010 individual. In 2006, she finished 52nd in the sprint, was lapped in the pursuit and placed 49th in the individual. In 2010, she also placed 52nd in the sprint and 44th in the pursuit.

As of February 2013, her best performance at the Biathlon World Championships is 11th, as part of the 2010 Kazakh mixed relay team. Her best individual performance is 27th, in the 2009 sprint.

As of February 2013, Lebedeva's best Biathlon World Cup result is 7th, as part of the Kazakh women's relay team in Antholz during the 2010/11 season. Her best individual performance is 19th, in the pursuit at Antholz in 2009/10. Her best overall finish in the Biathlon World Cup is 58th, in 2005/06.

Anna Lebedeva currently works as a children's cross-country ski coach in her hometown (2023).
