= Gerda Krūmiņa =

Latvian biathlete (born 1984)

Personal information
- Born: 26 November 1984 (age 41) Cēsis, Latvian SSR, Soviet Union

Sport
- Sport: Skiing
- Updated on 28 February 2013

Gerda Krūmiņa (born 26 November 1984 in Cēsis) is a Latvian biathlete.

Krūmiņa competed in the 2006 and 2010 Winter Olympics for Latvia. Her best finish was 18th, as part of the 2006 Latvian relay team. Her best individual showing was 48th, in the 2010 sprint. In 2006, she finished 74th in the sprint and 70th in the individual. In 2010, she was 48th in the sprint 57th in the pursuit and 69th in the individual, along with a 19th place finish in the relay.

As of February 2013, her best performance at the Biathlon World Championships is 17th, as part of the 2007 Latvian mixed relay team. Her best individual performance is 38th, in the 2007 individual.

As of February 2013, Krūmiņa's best performance in the Biathlon World Cup is 10th, as part of the women's relay team at Oberhof in 2007/08. Her best individual result is 22nd, in the sprint at Pokljuka in 2007/08. Her best overall finish in the Biathlon World Cup is 71st, in 2007/08.
