= Līga Glāzere =

Latvian biathlete (born 1986)

Personal information
- Born: 20 December 1986 Vecpiebalga, Latvian SSR, Soviet Union

Sport
- Sport: Skiing
- Updated on 28 February 2013

Līga Glāzere (born 20 December 1986 in Cēsis) is a Latvian biathlete.

Glāzere competed in the 2010 Winter Olympics for Latvia. Her best finish was 19th, as part of the Latvian relay team. Her best individual showing was 69th, in the sprint. She also placed 78th in the individual.

As of February 2013, her best performance at the Biathlon World Championships is 20th, as part of the 2008 and 2009 Latvian women's relay team. Her best individual performance is 65th, in the 2009 individual.

As of February 2013, Glāzere's best performance in the Biathlon World Cup is 10th, as part of the women's relay team at Oberhof in 2007/08. Her best individual result is 57th, achieved twice, once in a sprint and once in an individual.
