= Lyubov Filimonova =

Russian-born Kazakh biathlete (born 1988)

Personal information
- Born: August 31, 1988 (age 37) Moscow, Russian SSR, Soviet Union
- Height: 175 cm (5 ft 9 in)

Sport
- Sport: Skiing
- Updated on February 28, 2013

Lyubov Filimonova (born August 31, 1988, in Moscow) is a Russian-born Kazakh biathlete.

Filimonova competed in the 2010 Winter Olympics for Kazakhstan. Her best performance was finishing 14th as a part of the Kazakh relay team. Her best individual result was 57th in the individual. She also finished 67th in the sprint.

As of February 2013, Filimonova's best performance in the Biathlon World Cup is 10th, as part of the Kazakh women's relay team at Ruhpolding in 2009/10. Her best individual result is 35th, in the sprint at Pokljuka in 2009/10. Her best overall finish in the Biathlon World Cup is 95th, in 2009/10.
