= Selina Gasparin =

Swiss biathlete (born 1984)

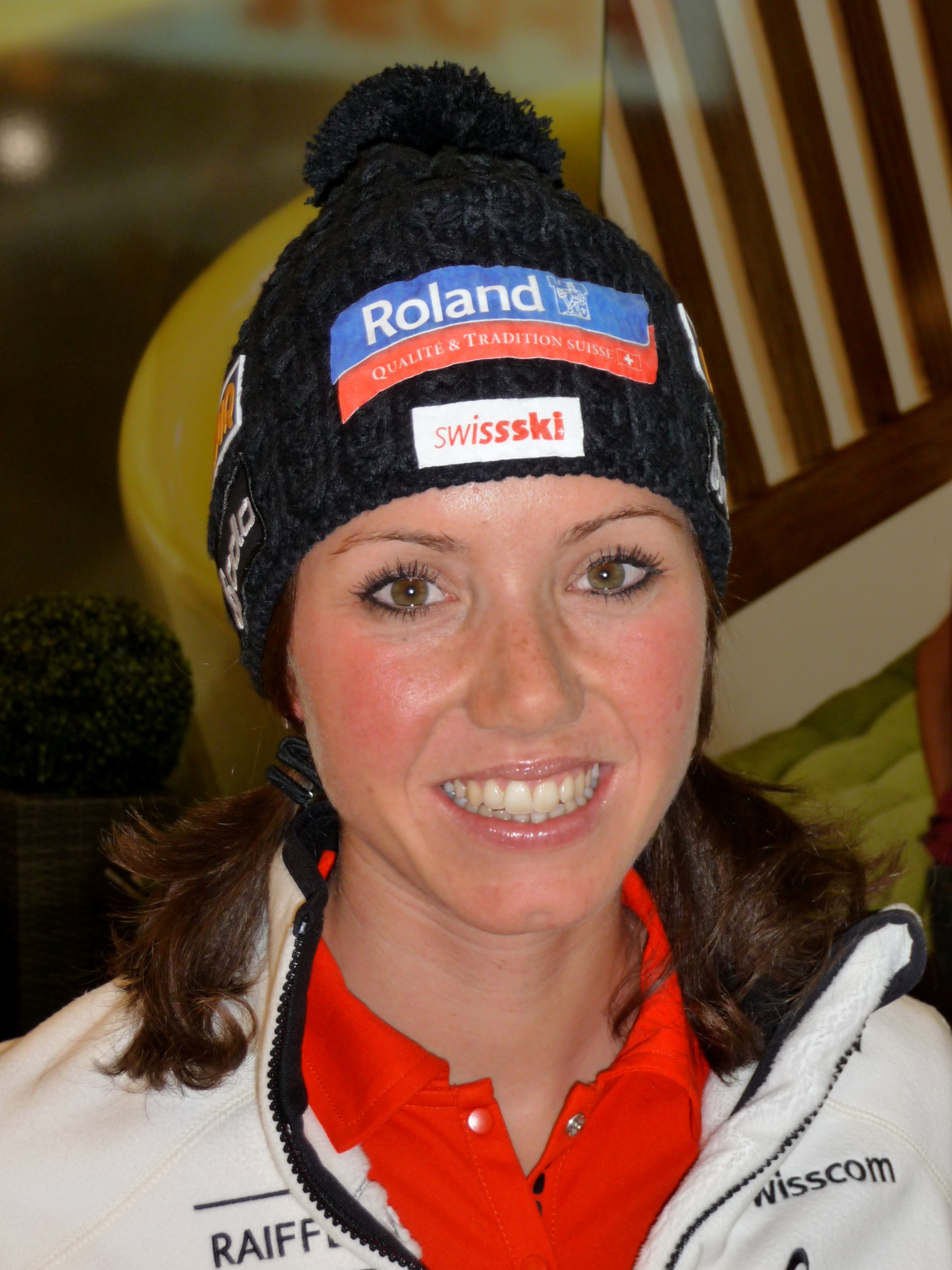
- Gasparin in 2010

Personal information
- Born: 3 April 1984 (age 42) Samedan, Switzerland
- Height: 163 cm (5 ft 4 in)

Sport
- Sport: Skiing

World Cup career
- Indiv. podiums: 3
- Indiv. wins: 2
Medal record
Women's biathlon
Representing Switzerland
Olympic Games
Silver medal – second place	2014 Sochi	Individual
- Updated on 14 February 2014

Selina Gasparin (born 3 April 1984) is a Swiss former biathlete. She won the silver medal in the individual event at the 2014 Winter Olympics, becoming the first Swiss female biathlete to win an Olympic medal. During the 2013–14 Biathlon World Cup season, she won sprint races in Hochfilzen and Annecy. She competed in four Winter Olympics between 2010 and 2022 and retired at the end of the 2021–22 season.

== Biography ==
Gasparin competed in the 2010 Winter Olympics for Switzerland. Her best performance was 40th in the individual. She also finished 56th in the sprint and 48th in the pursuit.

Early in her career Gasparin was the only woman in the Swiss biathlon World Cup team. The situation changed in 2011 when her younger sister Elisa Gasparin joined the team.

She won a silver medal in the Individual event at the 2014 Winter Olympics. Gasparin's medal made her the first Swiss female biathlete to win an Olympic medal.

As of February 2013, her best performance at the Biathlon World Championships was 10th, as part of the 2012 Swiss mixed relay team. Her best individual performance is 12th in the 2012 sprint.

As of February 2013, Gasparin's best individual performance in the Biathlon World Cup is 4th in the individual at Östersund in 2012/13. Her best overall finish in the Biathlon World Cup is 29th, in 2010/11 and 2011/12.

On 6 December 2013, Gasparin won her first World Cup event, a sprint race in Hochfilzen. A week later she took another win in sprint in Annecy-Le Grand Bornand.

She is the older sister of fellow biathletes Elisa Gasparin and Aita Gasparin. She married Russian cross-country skier and fellow Olympic medalist Ilia Chernousov in June 2014. In September 2014 Gasparin announced that she was pregnant and would miss the 2014-15 season.

She retired at the end of the 2021-22 season. After retiring from competition, Gasparin became head coach for youth at Swiss-Ski.

== Biathlon results ==
=== Olympic Games ===
Event	Individual	Sprint	Pursuit	Mass Start	Relay	Mixed Relay
(Canada) 2010 Vancouver	40th	56th	48th	–	–	—N/a
(Russia) 2014 Sochi	Silver	13th	15th	10th	9th	12th
(South Korea) 2018 Pyeongchang	65th	41st	39th	–	6th	–
(China) 2022 Beijing	62nd	–	–	–	–	–

=== Individual victories ===
2 victories (2 Sp)

Date	Event	Competition	Level
6 December 2013	(Austria) Hochfilzen	7.5 km Sprint	Biathlon World Cup
14 December 2013	(France) Annecy	7.5 km Sprint	Biathlon World Cup

== Cross-country skiing results ==
All results are sourced from the International Ski Federation (FIS).

=== World Championships ===
Year	Age	10 km individual	15 km skiathlon	30 km mass start	Sprint	4 × 5 km relay	Team sprint
2013	28	31	—	—	—	—	—

=== World Cup ===
==== Season standings ====
Season	Age	Discipline standings			Ski Tour standings			
Season	Age	Overall	Distance	Sprint	Nordic Opening	Tour de Ski	Ski Tour 2020	World Cup Final
2013	28	103	74	—	—	—	—N/a	—
2018	33	87	—	60	—	DNF	—N/a	—
2020	35	NC	NC	NC	—	DNF	—	—N/a
