= Jana Daubnerová =

Slovak biathlete (born 1984)

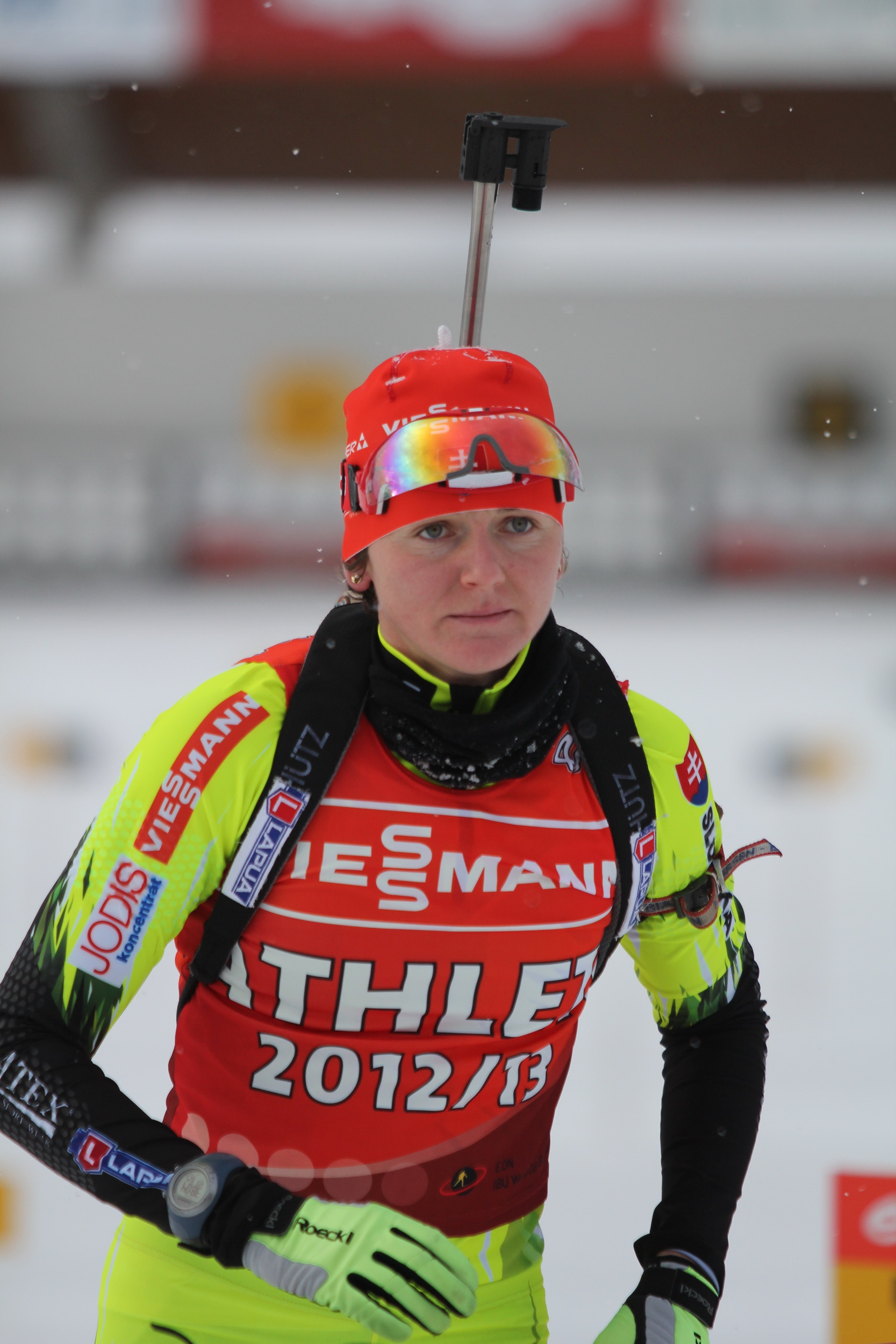
- Gereková during the World Cup in Hochfilzen 2012.

Personal information
- Full name: Jana Daubnerová
- Nationality: Slovakia
- Born: Jana Gereková; 27 November 1984 (age 41) Liptovský Mikuláš, Czechoslovakia

Sport
- Sport: Skiing
- Club: Liptovsky Hradok
- Updated on 28 February 2013

Jana "Janka" Daubnerová (née Gereková, born 27 November 1984 in Liptovský Mikuláš) is a Slovak former biathlete.

== Career ==
Gereková competed in the 2006 and 2010 Winter Olympics for Slovakia. Her best performance was 13th as part of the 2010 Slovak relay team. Her best individual finish was 40th, in both the 2010 sprint and pursuit. She also finished 59th in the 2006 individual and 47th in the 2010 individual.

As of February 2013, her best performance at the Biathlon World Championships is 7th, as part of the 2011 Slovak women's relay team and the 2012 and 2013 mixed relay teams. Her best individual performance is 8th, in the 2011 pursuit.

As of February 2013, Gereková has finished on the podium once in the Biathlon World Cup, winning a bronze as part of the Slovak mixed relay team in Kontiolahti during the 2011/12 season. Her best individual performance is 6th, achieved twice in sprint races during the 2012/13 season. Her best overall finish in the Biathlon World Cup is 28th, in 2011/12. f

== World Cup podiums ==
Season	Location	Event	Rank
2011/12	Kontiolahti	Mixed Relay	3rd place, bronze medalist(s)
