= Mihaela Purdea =

Romanian biathlete (born 1982)

Personal information
- Born: 17 December 1982 Bistrița, Romania

Sport
- Sport: Skiing
- Updated on 28 February 2013

Mihaela Purdea (born in Bistrița on 17 December 1982) is a Romanian biathlete.

Purdea competed in the 2006 and 2010 Winter Olympics for Romania. Her best performance was 10th, as part of the 2010 Romanian relay team. Her best individual performance came in the 2010 sprint, where she finished 39th. In 2006, she finished 77th in the sprint and 75th in the individual, as well as 14th in the relay. In 2010, she finished 49th in the pursuit and 41st in the individual.

As of February 2013, her best performance at the Biathlon World Championships is 8th, as part of the 2009 Romanian women's relay team. Her best individual performance is 44th, in the 2009 sprint.

As of February 2013, Purdea's best performance in the Biathlon World Cup is 6th, as part of the women's relay team at Ruhpolding in 2007/08. Her best individual result is 25th in the individual race at Östersund in 2009/10. Her best overall finish in the Biathlon World Cup is 70th, in 2009/10.
