= Madara Līduma =

Latvian biathlete (born 1982)

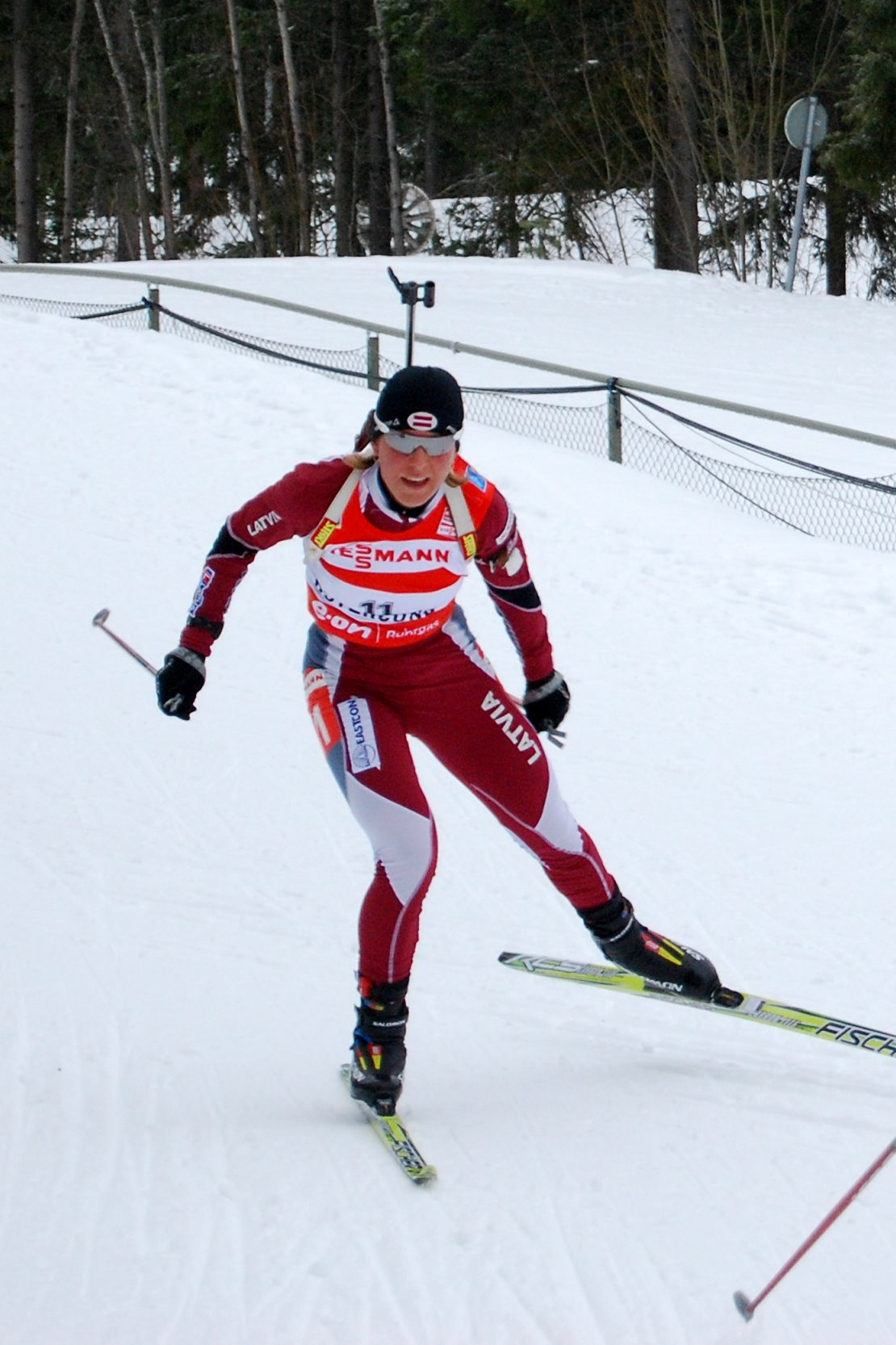

Personal information
- Born: 10 August 1982 (age 43) Gulbene, Latvia
- Height: 1.67 m (5 ft 5 1/2 in)

Sport
- Sport: Skiing

World Cup career
- Seasons: 2004- 2011
- Indiv. podiums: 0
- Indiv. wins: 0
- Updated on January 31, 2022

Madara Līduma (born 10 August 1982 in Gulbene, Latvia) is a former World Cup-level Latvian biathlete.

Her career's greatest achievement is the 10th place at the 2006 Torino Olympics 15 kilometre individual race. Due to financial difficulties, she decided to end her professional career in the autumn of 2011.

== World Cup totals ==
Season	Place
2004-05	62
2005-06	37
2006-07	56
2007-08	41
2008-09	64
