= Slovakia at the 2010 Winter Olympics =

- IOC code: SVK
- NOC: Slovak Olympic and Sports Committee
- Website: www.olympic.sk (in Slovak)

in Vancouver
- Competitors: 73 in 8 sports
- Flag bearers: Žigmund Pálffy (opening); Pavol Hurajt (closing)
- Medals Ranked 16th: Gold 1 Silver 2 Bronze 0 Total 3

Winter Olympics appearances (overview)
- 1994; 1998; 2002; 2006; 2010; 2014; 2018; 2022; 2026

Other related appearances
- Czechoslovakia (1924–1992)

Slovakia competed at the 2010 Winter Olympics in Vancouver, British Columbia, Canada. Slovak athletes earned their first gold medal ever in the Winter Olympics with Anastasiya Kuzmina's gold in the women's biathlon sprint event.

== Medalists ==
| Medal | Name | Sport | Event | Date |
|---|---|---|---|---|
| Gold | Anastasiya Kuzmina | Biathlon | Women's sprint | 13 February |
| Silver | Anastasiya Kuzmina | Biathlon | Women's pursuit | 16 February |
| Silver | Pavol Hurajt | Biathlon | Men's mass start | 21 February |

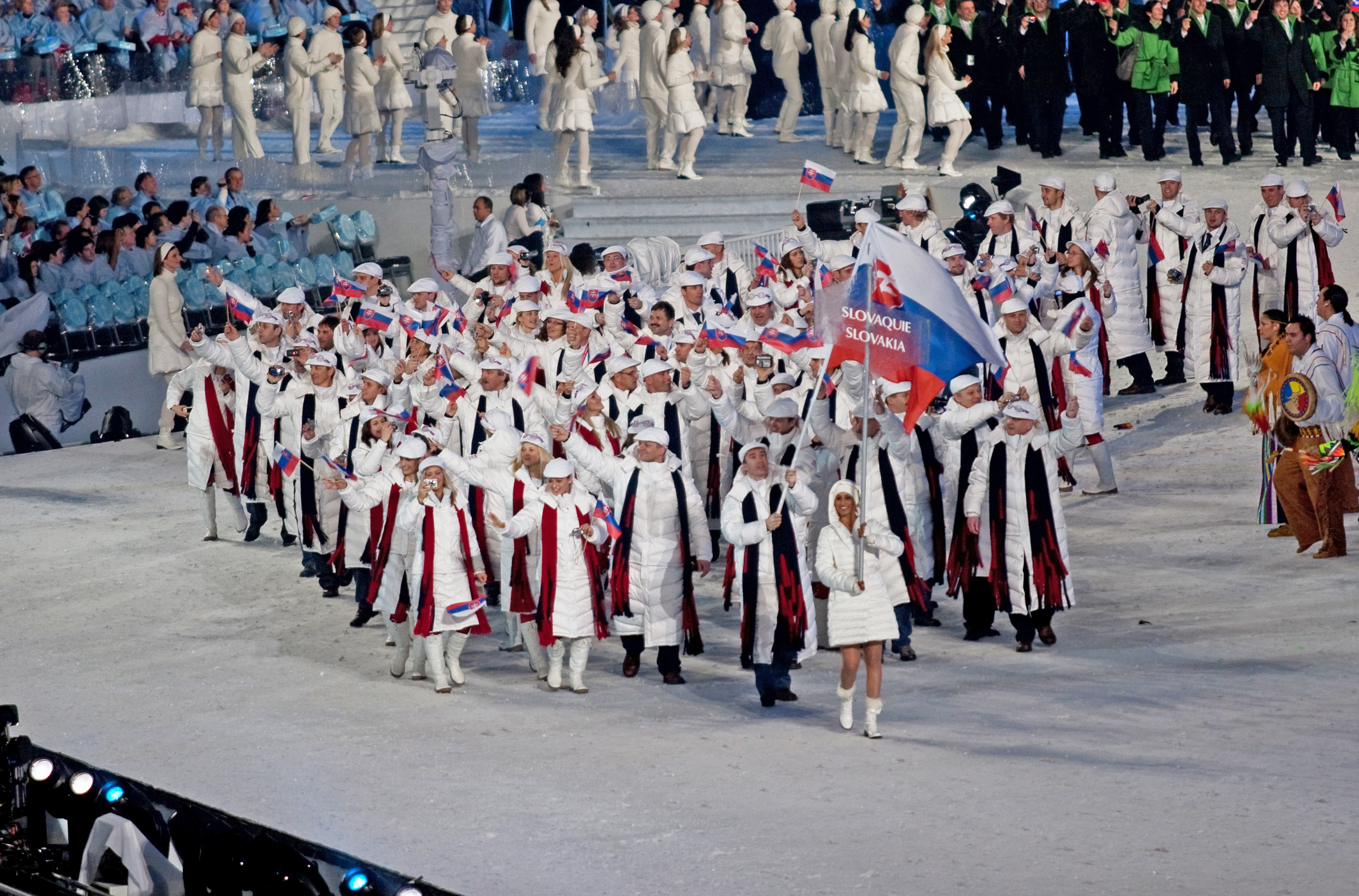
The athletes entering the stadium during the opening ceremonies.

== Alpine skiing ==
Men

| Athlete | Event | Final | | | |
| Athlete | Event | Run 1 | Run 2 | Total | Rank |
|---|---|---|---|---|---|
| Jaroslav Babušiak | Combined | DNF | | | DNF |
| Jaroslav Babušiak | Downhill | | | 1:59.99 | 52 |
| Jaroslav Babušiak | Giant slalom | 1:22.22 | 1:24.90 | 2:47.12 | 44 |
| Jaroslav Babušiak | Slalom | 52.10 | 54.76 | 1:46.86 | 30 |
| Jaroslav Babušiak | Super-G | | | 1:35.25 | 37 |

Women

| Athlete | Event | Final | | | |
| Athlete | Event | Run 1 | Run 2 | Total | Rank |
|---|---|---|---|---|---|
| Jana Gantnerová | Giant slalom | 1:20.00 | 1:15.73 | 2:35.73 | 35 |
| Jana Gantnerová | Slalom | 53.54 | 53.92 | 1:47.46 | 24 |
| Veronika Zuzulová | Giant slalom | 1:18.96 | DNS | | |
| Veronika Zuzulová | Slalom | 52.11 | 53.03 | 1:45.14 | 10 |

== Biathlon ==
Men

| Athlete | Event | Final | | |
| Athlete | Event | Time | Misses | Rank |
|---|---|---|---|---|
| Pavol Hurajt | Sprint | 25:15.0 | 1 (0+1) | 7 |
| Pavol Hurajt | Pursuit | 35:12.8 | 3 (1+0+0+2) | 16 |
| Pavol Hurajt | Mass start | 35:52.3 | 0 | 2nd place, silver medalist(s) |
| Pavol Hurajt | Individual | 49:39.0 | 1 (0+0+1+0) | 4 |
| Marek Matiaško | Sprint | 27:37.4 | 3 (1+2) | 66 |
| Marek Matiaško | Individual | 52:47.9 | 2 (0+1+0+1) | 33 |
| Miroslav Matiaško | Sprint | 28:15.9 | 4 (1+3) | 76 |
| Miroslav Matiaško | Individual | 53:29.2 | 3 (1+1+0+1) | 47 |
| Dušan Šimočko | Sprint | 28:11.4 | 3 (1+2) | 75 |
| Dušan Šimočko | Individual | 51:20.6 | 2 (0+0+2+0) | 18 |

Men's relay

| Athlete | Event | Final | | |
| Athlete | Event | Time | Misses | Rank |
|---|---|---|---|---|
| Miroslav Matiaško; Marek Matiaško; Dušan Šimočko; Pavol Hurajt | 4 x 7.5 km relay | 1:28:54.1 | 14 (2+12) | 14 |

Women

| Athlete | Event | Final | | |
| Athlete | Event | Time | Misses | Rank |
|---|---|---|---|---|
| Jana Gereková | Sprint | 21:54.0 | 3 (1+2) | 40 |
| Jana Gereková | Pursuit | 34:17.4 | 4 (0+3+0+1) | 40 |
| Jana Gereková | Individual | 45:46.4 | 4 (1+0+1+2) | 46 |
| Martina Halinárová | Sprint | 22:19.0 | 2 (1+1) | 54 |
| Martina Halinárová | Pursuit | LAP | 6 (1+2+3+ ) | LAP |
| Martina Halinárová | Individual | 45:38.7 | 3 (0+1+0+2) | 44 |
| Ľubomíra Kalinová | Sprint | 23:47.2 | 5 (3+2) | 81 |
| Ľubomíra Kalinová | Individual | 50:38.7 | 7 (2+0+2+3) | 80 |
| Anastasiya Kuzmina | Sprint | 19:55.6 | 1 (1+0) | 1st place, gold medalist(s) |
| Anastasiya Kuzmina | Pursuit | 30:28.3 | 2 (0+1+1+0) | 2nd place, silver medalist(s) |
| Anastasiya Kuzmina | Mass start | 36:02.9 | 3 (1+1+1+0) | 8 |
| Anastasiya Kuzmina | Individual | 45:16.0 | 5 (2+1+1+1) | 39 |

Women's relay

| Athlete | Event | Final | | |
| Athlete | Event | Time | Misses | Rank |
|---|---|---|---|---|
| Martina Halinárová; Anastasiya Kuzmina; Natália Prekopová; Jana Gereková | 4 x 6 km relay | 1:13:15.8 | 12 (1+11) | 13 |

== Bobsleigh ==
Two-man

| Athletes | Run 1 | Run 2 | Run 3 | Run 4 | Total | Rank |
|---|---|---|---|---|---|---|
| Milan Jagnešák; Petr Narovec | 53.18 | 53.16 | 52.73 | 52.99 | 3:32.06 | 20 |

Four-man

| Athletes | Run 1 | Run 2 | Run 3 | Run 4 | Total | Rank |
|---|---|---|---|---|---|---|
| Milan Jagnešák; Martin Tešovič; Marcel Lopuchovský; Petr Narovec | 55.25 | DNS | | | | |

== Cross-country skiing ==
Men

| Athlete | Event | Qualification | | Quarterfinal | | Semifinal | | Final | |
| Athlete | Event | Time | Rank | Time | Rank | Time | Rank | Time | Rank |
|---|---|---|---|---|---|---|---|---|---|
| Martin Bajčičák | 15 km freestyle | | | | | | | 34:59.3 | 23 |
| Martin Bajčičák | 30 km pursuit | | | | | | | 1:17:58.1 | 25 |
| Ivan Bátory | 15 km freestyle | | | | | | | 35:38.1 | 40 |
| Michal Malák | 15 km freestyle | | | | | | | 36:22.8 | 54 |
| Peter Mlynár | Sprint | 3:55.76 | 57 | DNQ | | | | | 57 |

Women

Alena Procházková participated only for one event due to inflammation of the trachea.

| Athlete | Event | Qualification | | Quarterfinal | | Semifinal | | Final | |
| Athlete | Event | Time | Rank | Time | Rank | Time | Rank | Time | Rank |
|---|---|---|---|---|---|---|---|---|---|
| Alena Procházková | Sprint | 3:46.16 | 16 Q | 3:40.1 | 4 | DNQ | | | 18 |

== Figure skating ==
| Athlete(s) | Event | CD | | SP/OD | | FS/FD | | Total | |
| Athlete(s) | Event | Points | Rank | Points | Rank | Points | Rank | Points | Rank |
|---|---|---|---|---|---|---|---|---|---|
| Ivana Reitmayerová | Ladies' | | | 41.94 | 28 | DNQ | | | |

== Ice hockey ==
=== Men's tournament ===
Roster

The following is the Slovak roster in the men's ice hockey tournament of the 2010 Winter Olympics.

| No. | Pos. | Name | Height | Weight | Birthdate | Birthplace | 2009–10 team |
|---|---|---|---|---|---|---|---|
| 31 | G | Peter Budaj | 185 cm (6 ft 1 in) | 91 kg (201 lb) | 18 September 1982 | Banská Bystrica | (United States) Colorado Avalanche (NHL) |
| 41 | G | Jaroslav Halák | 180 cm (5 ft 11 in) | 82 kg (181 lb) | 13 May 1985 | Bratislava | (Canada) Montreal Canadiens (NHL) |
| 35 | G | Rastislav Staňa | 185 cm (6 ft 1 in) | 88 kg (194 lb) | 10 January 1980 | Košice | (Russia) Severstal (KHL) |
| 7 | D | Ivan Baranka | 191 cm (6 ft 3 in) | 91 kg (201 lb) | 19 May 1985 | Ilava | (Russia) Spartak Moscow (KHL) |
| 33 | D | Zdeno Chára – C | 206 cm (6 ft 9 in) | 116 kg (256 lb) | 18 March 1977 | Trenčín | (United States) Boston Bruins (NHL) |
| 68 | D | Milan Jurčina | 193 cm (6 ft 4 in) | 111 kg (245 lb) | 7 June 1983 | Liptovský Mikuláš | (United States) Columbus Blue Jackets (NHL) |
| 14 | D | Andrej Meszároš | 188 cm (6 ft 2 in) | 100 kg (220 lb) | 13 October 1985 | Považská Bystrica | (United States) Tampa Bay Lightning (NHL) |
| 44 | D | Andrej Sekera | 183 cm (6 ft 0 in) | 91 kg (201 lb) | 8 June 1986 | Bojnice | (United States) Buffalo Sabres (NHL) |
| 77 | D | Martin Štrbák | 191 cm (6 ft 3 in) | 96 kg (212 lb) | 15 January 1975 | Prešov | (Russia) HC MVD (KHL) |
| 17 | D | Ľubomír Višňovský | 180 cm (5 ft 11 in) | 84 kg (185 lb) | 11 August 1976 | Topoľčany | (Canada) Edmonton Oilers (NHL) |
| 23 | F | Ľuboš Bartečko | 183 cm (6 ft 0 in) | 86 kg (190 lb) | 14 July 1976 | Kežmarok | (Sweden) Färjestad (SEL) |
| 8 | F | Martin Cibák | 185 cm (6 ft 1 in) | 89 kg (196 lb) | 17 May 1980 | Liptovský Mikuláš | (Russia) Spartak Moscow (KHL) |
| 38 | F | Pavol Demitra – A | 183 cm (6 ft 0 in) | 91 kg (201 lb) | 29 November 1974 | Dubnica nad Váhom | (Canada) Vancouver Canucks (NHL) |
| 10 | F | Marián Gáborík | 185 cm (6 ft 1 in) | 90 kg (200 lb) | 14 February 1982 | Trenčín | (United States) New York Rangers (NHL) |
| 26 | F | Michal Handzuš | 196 cm (6 ft 5 in) | 98 kg (216 lb) | 11 March 1977 | Banská Bystrica | (United States) Los Angeles Kings (NHL) |
| 91 | F | Marcel Hossa | 192 cm (6 ft 4 in) | 100 kg (220 lb) | 12 October 1981 | Ilava | (Latvia) Dinamo Riga (KHL) |
| 81 | F | Marián Hossa – A | 187 cm (6 ft 2 in) | 95 kg (209 lb) | 12 January 1979 | Stará Ľubovňa | (United States) Chicago Blackhawks (NHL) |
| 82 | F | Tomáš Kopecký | 191 cm (6 ft 3 in) | 91 kg (201 lb) | 5 February 1982 | Ilava | (United States) Chicago Blackhawks (NHL) |
| 24 | F | Žigmund Pálffy | 178 cm (5 ft 10 in) | 82 kg (181 lb) | 5 May 1972 | Skalica | (Slovakia) HK 36 Skalica (SVK) |
| 92 | F | Branko Radivojevič | 183 cm (6 ft 0 in) | 94 kg (207 lb) | 24 November 1980 | Piešťany | (Russia) Spartak Moscow (KHL) |
| 18 | F | Miroslav Šatan | 191 cm (6 ft 3 in) | 87 kg (192 lb) | 22 October 1974 | Topoľčany | (United States) Boston Bruins (NHL) |
| 15 | F | Jozef Stümpel | 191 cm (6 ft 3 in) | 101 kg (223 lb) | 20 July 1972 | Nitra | (Kazakhstan) Barys Astana (KHL) |
| 20 | F | Richard Zedník | 185 cm (6 ft 1 in) | 91 kg (201 lb) | 6 January 1976 | Banská Bystrica | (Russia) Lokomotiv Yaroslavl (KHL) |

Defenceman Richard Lintner was initially selected, but was replaced by Ivan Baranka.

==== Group play ====
Slovakia played in Group B.

Round-robin

All times are local (UTC-8).

| 17 February 2010; 21:00 | Czech Republic | 3–1 (1–0, 2–1, 0–0) | Slovakia | Canada Hockey Place, Vancouver; Attendance: 16,924 |

Game reference

Tomáš Vokoun
Goalies
Jaroslav Halák
Referees:
(Switzerland) Brent Reiber
(Canada) Brad Watson
Linesmen:
(United States) Shane Heyer
(Canada) Sylvain Losier

| P. Eliáš (M. Havlát, M. Blaťák) – 9:02 | 1–0 |
| | 1–1 | 20:47 – M. Gáborík (Mari. Hossa, P. Demitra) |
| J. Jágr (R. Červenka) – 37:56 | 2–1 |
| T. Plekanec (J. Jágr, M. Židlický) – 39:58 | 3–1 |

8 min
Penalties
12 min
24
Shots
35

| 18 February 2010; 21:00 | Slovakia | 2–1 (SO) (0–0, 0–1, 1–0, 0–0, 1–0) | Russia | Canada Hockey Place, Vancouver; Attendance: 17,202 |

Game reference
| Jaroslav Halák | Goalies | Ilya Bryzgalov | Referees: (Switzerland) Danny Kurmann (Canada) Bill McCreary; Linesmen: (Canada) Jay Sharrers (Germany) Felix Winnekens |
| / 0–1 / 25:32 – A. Morozov (A. Markov, S. Zinovyev); Mari. Hossa (Demitra, Marc. Hossa) – 49:48 / 1–1 | | | Referees: (Switzerland) Danny Kurmann (Canada) Bill McCreary; Linesmen: (Canada) Jay Sharrers (Germany) Felix Winnekens |
| J. Stümpel; P. Demitra (miss); Mari. Hossa (miss); J. Stümpel (miss); M. Handzuš (miss); M. Gáborík (miss); P. Demitra | Shootout | (miss) A. Morozov; A. Ovechkin; (miss) P. Datsyuk; (miss) A. Ovechkin; (miss) I. Kovalchuk; (miss) A. Ovechkin; (miss) E. Malkin | Referees: (Switzerland) Danny Kurmann (Canada) Bill McCreary; Linesmen: (Canada) Jay Sharrers (Germany) Felix Winnekens |
| 10 min | Penalties | 6 min | Referees: (Switzerland) Danny Kurmann (Canada) Bill McCreary; Linesmen: (Canada) Jay Sharrers (Germany) Felix Winnekens |
| 32 | Shots | 37 | Referees: (Switzerland) Danny Kurmann (Canada) Bill McCreary; Linesmen: (Canada) Jay Sharrers (Germany) Felix Winnekens |

| 20 February 2010; 16:30 | Latvia | 0–6 (0–3, 0–2, 0–1) | Slovakia | Canada Hockey Place, Vancouver; Attendance: 17,023 |

Game reference

Edgars Masaļskis
Goalies
Jaroslav Halák
Referees:
(Canada) Dan O'Halloran
(Sweden) Marcus Vinnerborg
Linesmen:
(Ukraine) Andriy Kicha
(United States) Brian Murphy

| 0–1 | 2:44 – Ľ. Višňovský (J. Stümpel, R. Zedník) (PP) |
| 0–2 | 9:11 – R. Zedník (M. Handzuš, Ľ. Bartečko) |
| 0–3 | 17:08 – J. Stümpel (Ž. Pálffy) |
| 0–4 | 21:07 – Mari. Hossa (J. Stümpel) (PP) |
| 0–5 | 22:20 – M. Handzuš |
| 0–6 | 57:20 – I. Baranka (M. Štrbák, M. Handzuš) |

6 min
Penalties
8 min
21
Shots
37

Standings

| Team | Pld | W | OTW | OTL | L | GF | GA | GD | Pts | Qualification |
|---|---|---|---|---|---|---|---|---|---|---|
| Russia | 3 | 2 | 0 | 1 | 0 | 13 | 6 | +7 | 7 | Quarterfinals |
| Czech Republic | 3 | 2 | 0 | 0 | 1 | 10 | 7 | +3 | 6 | |
| Slovakia | 3 | 1 | 1 | 0 | 1 | 9 | 4 | +5 | 5 | |
| Latvia | 3 | 0 | 0 | 0 | 3 | 4 | 19 | −15 | 0 | |

Source: IIHF

==== Final rounds ====
Qualification playoff

| 23 February 2010; 21:00 | Slovakia | 4–3 (3–1, 0–2, 1–0) | Norway | Canada Hockey Place, Vancouver; Attendance: 17,583 |

Game reference

Jaroslav Halák
Goalies
Pål Grotnes
Referees:
(Russia) Vyacheslav Bulanov
(Canada) Marc Joannette
Linesmen:
(Ukraine) Andriy Kicha
(Canada) Sylvain Losier

| M. Handzuš (M. Gáborík, Mari. Hossa) (PP) – 7:03 | 1–0 |
| M. Gáborík (P. Demitra, Z. Chára) (PP) – 9:48 | 2–0 |
| | 2–1 | 18:06 – M. Zuccarello (J. Holøs) |
| R. Zedník (J. Stümpel, Ž. Pálffy) (PP) – 18:52 | 3–1 |
| | 3–2 | 27:27 – T. Vikingstad (P. Thoresen, M. Zuccarello) |
| | 3–3 | 39:59 – A. Bastiansen (M. Olimb, P. Thoresen) |
| M. Šatan (Ľ. Višňovský, R. Zedník) – 48:41 | 4–3 |

4 min
Penalties
29 min
40
Shots
19

Quarterfinal

| 24 February 2010; 21:00 | Sweden | 3–4 (0–0, 2–3, 1–1) | Slovakia | Canada Hockey Place, Vancouver; Attendance: 17,493 |

Game reference

Henrik Lundqvist
Goalies
Jaroslav Halák
Referees:
(Canada) Bill McCreary
(Finland) Jyri Rönn
Linesmen:
(United States) Peter Feola
(Canada) Jean Morin

| | 0–1 | 27:34 – M. Gáborík (Mari. Hossa, P. Demitra) (PP) |
| | 0–2 | 28:11 – A. Sekera (R. Zedník, Ž. Pálffy) |
| P. Hörnqvist (P. Forsberg) – 33:49 | 1–2 |
| H. Zetterberg (T. Enström) – 34:26 | 2–2 |
| | 2–3 | 39:12 – P. Demitra (Z. Chára, Mari. Hossa) (PP) |
| | 2–4 | 49:01 – T. Kopecký (Mari. Hossa, Demitra) |
| D. Alfredsson (N. Bäckström, L. Eriksson) – 49:39 | 3–4 |

10 min
Penalties
6 min
29
Shots
14

Semifinal

| 26 February 2010; 18:30 | Canada | 3–2 (2–0, 1–0, 0–2) | Slovakia | Canada Hockey Place, Vancouver; Attendance: 17,799 |

Game reference

Roberto Luongo
Goalies
Jaroslav Halák
Referees:
(United States) Dennis LaRue
(Finland) Jyri Rönn
Linesmen:
(Finland) Stefan Fonselius
(United States) Thor Nelson

| P. Marleau (S. Weber, S. Niedermayer) – 13:30 | 1–0 |
| B. Morrow (C. Pronger, R. Getzlaf) – 15:17 | 2–0 |
| R. Getzlaf (C. Perry, C. Pronger) (PP) – 36:54 | 3–0 |
| | 3–1 | 51:35 – Ľ. Višňovský (J. Stümpel) |
| | 3–2 | 55:07 – M. Handzuš (R. Zedník, M. Šatan) |

2 min
Penalties
4 min
28
Shots
21

Bronze medal game

| 27 February 2010; 19:00 | (bronze) Finland | 5–3 (1–0, 0–3, 4–0) | Slovakia | Canada Hockey Place, Vancouver; Attendance: 17,322 |

Game reference

Miikka Kiprusoff
Goalies
Jaroslav Halák
Referees:
(Canada) Paul Devorski
(Canada) Brad Watson
Linesmen:
(Czech Republic) Petr Blümel
(Russia) Yuri Oskirko

| S. Salo (PP) – 18:50 | 1–0 |
| | 1–1 | 29:56 – M. Gáborík (P. Demitra, Z. Chára) (PP) |
| | 1–2 | 35:38 – Mari. Hossa (M. Handzuš, P. Demitra) (PP2) |
| | 1–3 | 38:45 – P. Demitra (Mari. Hossa) (SH) |
| N. Hagman (K. Timonen) (PP) – 45:06 | 2–3 |
| O. Jokinen (J. Ruutu) – 46:41 | 3–3 |
| O. Jokinen (J. Pitkänen, M. Kiprusoff) (PP) – 48:41 | 4–3 |
| V. Filppula (K. Timonen) (EN) – 59:49 | 5–3 |

14 min
Penalties
18 min
33
Shots
22

=== Women's tournament ===
Roster

The following is the Slovak roster in the women's ice hockey tournament of the 2010 Winter Olympics.

| Position | Name | Height | Weight | Birthdate | Birthplace | 2009–10 team |
|---|---|---|---|---|---|---|
| G | Jana Budajová | 166 | 53 | 16 November 1992 | Liptovský Mikuláš | HK Poprad |
| G | Monika Kvaková | 164 | 58 | 15 December 1988 | Žiar nad Hronom | HC Slovan Bratislava |
| G | Zuzana Tomčíková | 179 | 72 | 23 April 1988 | Zvolen | Bemidji State Beavers |
| D | Petra Babiaková | 175 | 70 | 27 July 1977 | Zvolen | HC Slovan Bratislava |
| D | Barbora Brémová | 168 | 60 | 24 August 1991 | Košice | HC Slovan Bratislava |
| D | Iveta Karafiátová – C | 178 | 75 | 14 May 1988 | Bratislava | Linköpings HC |
| D | Michaela Matejová | 169 | 57 | 2 March 1986 | Martin | SC Reinach |
| D | Petra Országhová | 168 | 58 | 7 April 1981 | Banská Bystrica | HC Slovan Bratislava |
| D | Edita Raková | 171 | 62 | 18 May 1978 | Humenné | HC Slovan Bratislava |
| F | Natalie Babonyová | 175 | 70 | 22 October 1983 | Oshawa, Canada | Toronto Crush |
| F | Nikoleta Celárová | 168 | 60 | 27 February 1983 | Kežmarok | HC Slovan Bratislava |
| F | Janka Čulíková | 178 | 75 | 30 June 1983 | Martin | HK Spišská Nová Ves |
| F | Nicol Čupková | 169 | 57 | 4 November 1992 | Košice | HC Slovan Bratislava |
| F | Anna Džurňáková – A | 168 | 58 | 24 January 1983 | Kežmarok | HC Slovan Bratislava |
| F | Nikola Gápová | 171 | 62 | 19 June 1989 | Poprad | HC Slovan Bratislava |
| F | Maria Herichová | 175 | 70 | 12 June 1990 | Poprad | HC Slovan Bratislava |
| F | Petra Jurčová | 168 | 60 | 22 June 1987 | Košice | HC Slovan Bratislava |
| F | Jana Kapustová – A | 178 | 75 | 11 August 1983 | Žilina | Tornado Moscow |
| F | Zuzana Moravčíková | 169 | 57 | 23 October 1980 | Ružomberok | HC Slovan Bratislava |
| F | Petra Pravlíková | 168 | 58 | 4 June 1985 | Levoča | Tornado Moscow |
| F | Martina Veličková | 171 | 62 | 17 February 1989 | Prešov | HC Slovan Bratislava |

==== Group play ====
Slovakia played in Group A.

Round-robin

All times are local (UTC-8).

| 13 February 2010; 17:00 | Canada | 18–0 (7–0, 6–0, 5–0) | Slovakia | Canada Hockey Place, Vancouver; Attendance: 16,496 |

Game reference

Kim St-Pierre
Goalies
Zuzana Tomčíková
Referee:
Joy Tottman (Great Britain)

| Irwin (Vaillancourt, Johnston) – 1:39 | 1–0 |
| Bonhomme (Hefford, MacLeod) – 3:06 | 2–0 |
| Agosta (Ouellette, Wickenheiser) (PP) – 5:38 | 3–0 |
| MacLeod (Bonhomme, Ouellette) – 8:21 | 4–0 |
| Agosta (Kellar, Sostorics) – 11:34 | 5–0 |
| Kingsbury (Piper, Apps) – 15:09 | 6–0 |
| Sostorics (Hefford, Agosta) – 16:20 | 7–0 |
| Vaillancourt (Johnston) – 23:42 | 8–0 |
| Poulin (PP) – 27:21 | 9–0 |
| Agosta (Hefford, Ouellette) – 30:19 | 10–0 |
| Hefford (Wickenheiser) (SH) – 32:00 | 11–0 |
| Ouellette (Apps, Sostorics) (SH) – 32:44 | 12–0 |
| MacLeod (Poulin, Sostorics) – 36:42 | 13–0 |
| Hefford (Agosta, MacLeod) – 44:23 | 14–0 |
| Irwin (Vaillancourt, Ward) – 44:37 | 15–0 |
| Piper (Wickenheiser) – 46:54 | 16–0 |
| Hefford (Ouellette, Kellar) – 51:03 | 17–0 |
| Kingsbury (Botterill) – 52:52 | 18–0 |

10 min
Penalties
12 min
67
Shots
9

| 15 February 2010; 19:00 | Sweden | 6–2 (3–2, 1–0, 2–0) | Slovakia | UBC Winter Sports Centre, Vancouver; Attendance: 5,323 |

Game reference

Sara Grahn
Goalies
Zuzana Tomčíková
Referee:
Aina Høve (Norway)

| Winberg (Holmlöv, Holst) (PP) – 5:01 | 1–0 |
| | 1–1 | 9:52 – Džurňáková (Babonyová, Herichová) |
| Winberg (Eliasson, Holmlöv) (PP) – 12:11 | 2–1 |
| | 2–2 | 13:29 – Čupková (Čulíková, Kapustová) |
| Asserholt (Myrén, Östberg) – 16:07 | 3–2 |
| Winberg (E. Andersson) – 29:07 | 4–2 |
| Holmlöv (Holst, G. Andersson) (PP) – 46:08 | 5–2 |
| Winberg (Nordin) – 53:20 | 6–2 |

10 min
Penalties
16 min
48
Shots
16

| 17 February 2010; 19:00 | Slovakia | 2–5 (1–0, 0–1, 1–4) | Switzerland | UBC Winter Sports Centre, Vancouver; Attendance: 5,272 |

Game reference

Zuzana Tomčíková
Goalies
Florence Schelling
Referee:
Ulla Sipilä (Finland)

| Čulíková (Čupková) – 7:10 | 1–0 |
| | 1–1 | 35:39 – S. Marty |
| Čulíková (Kapustová, Čupková) – 40:19 | 2–1 |
| | 2–2 | 50:35 – S. Marty (Nussbaum) |
| | 2–3 | 51:18 – Benz (Meier, Schelling) |
| | 2–4 | 56:28 – Lehmann (Leimgruber) (SH) |
| | 2–5 | 58:25 – S. Marty (Hafliger, Benz) |

12 min
Penalties
12 min
33
Shots
45

Standings

| Team | Pld | W | OTW | OTL | L | GF | GA | GD | Pts | Qualification |
|---|---|---|---|---|---|---|---|---|---|---|
| Canada | 3 | 3 | 0 | 0 | 0 | 41 | 2 | +39 | 9 | Semifinals |
| Sweden | 3 | 2 | 0 | 0 | 1 | 10 | 15 | −5 | 6 | Semifinals |
| Switzerland | 3 | 1 | 0 | 0 | 2 | 6 | 15 | −9 | 3 | 5–8th classification |
| Slovakia | 3 | 0 | 0 | 0 | 3 | 4 | 29 | −25 | 0 | 5–8th classification |

Source: ESPN

==== Classification rounds ====
Fifth place semifinal

| 20 February 2010; 19:00 | Russia | 4–2 (2–0, 1–1, 1–1) | Slovakia | UBC Winter Sports Centre, Vancouver; Attendance: 5,488 |

Game reference

Irina Gashennikova
Goalies
Zuzana Tomčíková
Referee:
Aina Høve (Norway)
Linesmen:
Annica Flöden (Sweden)
Kerry Rumble (Canada)

| Sotnikova (Lebedeva) – 7:34 | 1–0 |
| Gavrilova (Sergina, Smolentseva) (PP) – 18:16 | 2–0 |
| | 2–1 | 23:24 – Pravlíková (Veličková) (PP) |
| Terentieva (Kapustina, Dyubanok) (SH) – 33:45 | 3–1 |
| | 3–2 | 40:31 – Kapustová (Veličková) |
| Gavrilova (PP) – 50:26 | 4–2 |

8 min
Penalties
8 min
43
Shots
19

Seventh place game

| 22 February 2010; 14:00 | China | 3–1 (0–1, 1–0, 2–0) | Slovakia | UBC Winter Sports Centre, Vancouver; Attendance: 5,284 |

Game reference

Shi Yao
Goalies
Zuzana Tomčíková
Referee:
Joy Tottman (Great Britain)

| | 0–1 | 10:37 – Pravlíková (Jurčová, Veličková) |
| Wang L. (Yu, Jiang) – 37:15 | 1–1 |
| Sun (Zhang S., Jin) – 45:04 | 2–1 |
| Wang L. (Zhang B.) – 51:44 | 3–1 |

4 min
Penalties
6 min
32
Shots
21

== Luge ==
Women's singles

| Athlete | Run 1 | Run 2 | Run 3 | Run 4 | Total | Rank |
|---|---|---|---|---|---|---|
| Veronika Sabolová | 41.999 | 41.925 | 42.563 | 42.055 | 2:48.542 | 14 |
| Jana Šišajová | 42.297 | 42.172 | 42.529 | 48.101 | 2:55.099 | 27 |

Men's singles

| Athlete | Run 1 | Run 2 | Run 3 | Run 4 | Total | Rank |
|---|---|---|---|---|---|---|
| Jozef Ninis | 49.196 | 49.153 | 49.643 | 49.039 | 3:17.414 | 24 |

Doubles

| Athlete | Run 1 | Run 2 | Total | Rank |
|---|---|---|---|---|
| Ján Harniš & Branislav Regec | 42.018 | 41.924 | 1:23.942 | 11 |

== Ski jumping ==
Men

| Athlete | Event | Qualifying | | | First round | | | Final | | |
| Athlete | Event | Distance (m) | Points | Rank | Distance (m) | Points | Rank | Distance (m) | Points | Rank |
|---|---|---|---|---|---|---|---|---|---|---|
| Tomáš Zmoray | Normal hill | 94.5 | 107.5 | 42 | DNQ | | | | | |
| Tomáš Zmoray | Large hill | 119.5 | 100.6 | 40 Q | 108.0 | 77.4 | 43 | DNQ | | |
