= Vatra =

Vatra ("hearth" or "fireplace" in Albanian and Romanian, and "fire" in Serbo-Croatian) may refer to:

== Geography ==
- Vatra, Botoşani County, a village in Hudeşti Commune, Botoşani County, Romania
- Vatra, Teleorman County, a village in Troianul Commune, Teleorman County, Romania
- Vatra, Moldova, a town in the Municipality of Chişinău

== Other ==
- Vatra (literary magazine), a literary magazine published in Romania
- Vatra (Slovak magazine), a Slovak magazine
- Vatra (band), a Croatian rock band
- Vatra (album), musical album of the band Divlje Jagode
- Vatra, the Pan-Albanian Federation of America, an Albanian organization in USA

== See also ==
- Baro Vatra, a village in Bangladesh
- Nëna e Vatrës, Albanian protector of the hearth
- Vatër, the fireplace or hearth in Albanian folklore
