= Martin Tešovič =

Slovak athlete

Personal information
- Born: 26 October 1974 (age 51) Bratislava, Slovakia
- Height: 1.82 m (6 ft 0 in)
- Weight: 105 kg (231 lb)
Medal record
Men's weightlifting
Representing Slovakia
World Championships
| Gold medal – first place | 1997 Chiangmai | – 99 kg |
| Bronze medal – third place | 2005 Doha | – 105 kg |
European Championships
| Gold medal – first place | 2007 Strasbourg | – 105 kg |
| Bronze medal – third place | 1999 La Coruña | – 105 kg |

Martin Tešovič (born 26 October 1974) is a Slovak bobsledder and weightlifter.

== Early and personal life ==
Having been involved in sports since childhood, Tešovič wanted to play football, but it did not appeal to him. Tešovič developed an interest in bobsleigh following a discussion with Milan Jagnešák, who asked if he could try the sport. The former initially refused but eventually decided to try it.

Tešovič has a son named Šimon with his girlfriend, Katarína.

== Career ==
=== Weightlifting ===
Tešovič competed in three Summer Olympics: 1996 (10th place; middle heavyweight), 2004 (no total, 105 kg category), and 2012 (11th; 105kg category with a total of 363kg). He won the gold medal at the 1997 World Weightlifting Championships in the men's sub-heavyweight class (99kg) with a total of 400kg. He finished third place at the 2005 World Weightlifting Championships, with a total of 412kg and was only 1kg behind the silver medalist Alexandru Bratan. Tešovič was supposed to participate at the 2008 Summer Olympics but did not enter the event due to Achilles tendon.

=== Bobsleigh ===
At the 2010 Winter Olympics, Tešovič teamed up with Milan Jagnešák, Marcel Lopuchovský, and Petr Narovec. They crashed out in the first round, but were eventually saved. At the 2013–14 Bobsleigh World Cup in Lake Placid, Tešovič finished fifth place during the four-man event with Jagnešák, Lukáš Kožienka, and Juraj Mokráš.
