= Juraj Mokráš =

Slovak bobsledder

Personal information
- Nationality: Slovakian
- Born: 28 December 1990 (age 35) Považská Bystrica, Czechoslovakia
- Height: 1.89 m (6 ft 2 in)
- Weight: 87 kg (192 lb)

Sport
- Country: Slovakia
- Sport: Bobsleigh

Juraj Mokráš (born 28 December 1990) is a Slovak bobsledder.

== Early life ==
Prior to his bobsleigh career, Mokráš was a track and field athlete who competed in the triple jump at the 2008 World Junior Championships in Athletics. He was introduced to bobsleigh by his friend who watched 2010 Winter Olympics. Mokráš took the sport as a possible opportunity in a sport in which he could establish himself at the top level.

== Career ==
Mokráš made his bobsleigh debut during the 2010–11 Bobsleigh World Cup at the Utah Olympic Park Track, where he teamed up with Milan Jagnešák in the two-man category. They finished eleventh place in the first round and improved to ninth place.

At the 2011–12 Bobsleigh World Cup, Mokráš formed a partnership with Róbert Chorvát in the two-man bobsleigh category. They later teamed up with Milan Jagnešák and Martin Tešovič in the four-man category, finishing 18th place. However, the quartet dropped to 20th place in the fourth round.

At the 2014 Winter Olympics, Mokráš teamed up with Jagnešák, Petr Narovec, and Lukáš Kožienka in the four-man bobsleigh category. They finished 25th place and did not advance to the final race.
