= Milo Urban =

Slovak writer, translator and journalist (1904–1982)

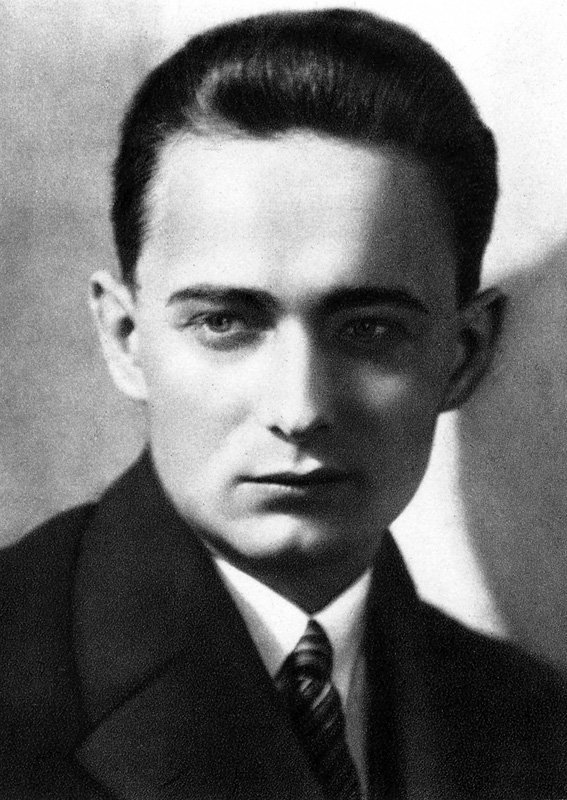
- Born: 24 August 1904; Rabcsicse, Austria-Hungary
- Died: 10 March 1982 (aged 77); Bratislava, Czechoslovakia
- Occupations: Writer, journalist
- Spouse: Žofia Urbanová-Paňáková
- Writing career
- Pen name: Ján Rovňan ml.
- Language: Slovak

Milo Urban (pseudonyms: Ján Rovňan ml., Podbabjagurský) (24 August 1904 – 10 March 1982) was Slovak writer, translator, journalist and an important representative of modern Slovak literature.

== Biography ==
Urban finished elementary school in Zázrivá and Podhorany, and then attended the gymnasia in Trstená and Ružomberok. From 1921, he worked as a journalist and editor for various newspapers and magazines. Between 1940 and 1945, Urban was editor-in-chief of Gardista, a propagandist magazine published by the Hlinka Guard, the paramilitary wing of the ruling Slovak People's Party in the clerico-fascist Slovak State.

Towards the end of World War II he fled the advancing Red Army to Austria, but was deported back to Czechoslovakia in 1947. The following year, Urban was put on trial for his role as editor of Gardista during the war, found guilty of collaboration and deprived of his publishing rights. From the 1950s he made a living as a translator. Urban died in Bratislava in 1982.

== Works ==
=== Stories, novellas, novels ===
- 1920 - Ej, ten tanec, story (published in the magazine Vatra)
- Nešťastník
- Už je pozde
- V zhone žitia
- Vanitas vanitatum
- Typograf
- 1922 - Jašek Kutliak spod Bačinky (Jašek Kutliak from Under Bučinka), novella
- 1926 - Za vyšným mlynom (Beyond the Upper Mill), this work was used as a model to Eugen Suchoň's opera Krútňava
- 1928 - Výkriky bez ozveny (Calls Without Echo), collection of novellas
  - V súmraku
  - Štefan Koňarčík-Chrapek a Pán Boh
  - Rozprávka o Labudovi
  - Mičinova kobyla
  - Tajomstvo Pavla Hrona
  - Svedomie a Staroba
- 1932 - Z tichého frontu (From the Silent Front), collection of novellas
  - Skok do priepasti
  - Nie!
  - Roztopené srdce
  - Pred dražbou
  - Drevený chlieb
  - Človek, ktorý hľadá šťastie
- 1927 - Živý bič (The Living Whip), novel (1st part of the trilogy)
- 1930 - Hmly na úsvite (Fog at Dawn), free continuation of Živý bič (2nd part of the pentalogy)
- 1940 - V osídlach (In the Snares), free continuation of Živý bič (3rd part of the pentalogy)
- 1943 - Novely (Novellas)
- 1957 - Zhasnuté svetlá (Lights Doused), free continuation of Živý bič (4th part of the pentalogy)
- 1964 - Kto seje vietor (Who Sows the Wind), free continuation of Živý bič (5th part of the pentalogy)
- 1996 - Železom po železe

=== Essays ===
- 1970 - Zelená krv: Spomienky hájnikovho syna (Green Blood: Memories of the gamekeeper's son)
- 1992 - Kade-tade po Halinde
- 1994 - Na brehu krvavej rieky
- 1995 - Sloboda nie je špás

=== Other works ===
- 1920 / 1921 - Zavrhnutý, poem (published in the magazine Vatra)
- 1925 - Otroci predsudkov, play (excerpt published in the magazine Slovenský národ)
- 1934 - Česká literatúra a Slováci, lecture
- 1991 - Beta, kde si? , play (only year of inscenation, not published)

=== Translations ===
- 1951 - selection from Russian tales
- 1954 - Igor Newerly: Pamiątka z Celulozy
- 1959 - Aleksander Fredro: Pan Geldhab (Mr. Geldhab)
- 1960 - Karel Čapek and Josef Čapek: Zo života hmyzu (Pictures from the Insects' Life)
- 1961 - Karel Čapek: Matka (The Mother)
