= Milan Jagnešák =

Slovak bobsledder

Personal information
- Nationality: Slovak
- Born: 29 August 1969 (age 56) Rabčice, Czechoslovakia
- Height: 1.79 m (5 ft 10 in)
- Weight: 101 kg (223 lb)

Sport
- Country: Slovakia
- Sport: Bobsleigh
- Retired: 2014

Milan Jagnešák (born 29 August 1969) is a former Slovak bobsledder who serves as president of the Slovak Bobsleigh Federation. He competed in four Winter Olympics between 2002 and 2014.

== Early life ==
Jagnešák was born on 29 August 1969 in Rabčice. He has a younger brother named Peter. Jagnešak started bobsleigh in 1998 and thought of becoming a three-time participant in the Winter Olympic Games someday.

== Bobsleigh career ==
At the 2001–02 Bobsleigh World Cup, Jagnešák teamed up with Robert Kresťanko in the two-man bobsleigh category, finishing 30th place. They also at the finished 25th, 8th, and 27th places – respectively in the 2006–07 Bobsleigh World Cup, 2008–09 Bobsleigh World Cup, 2009–10 seasons.

On 6 December 2008, Jagnešák finished 14th place at another two-man bobsleigh event, this time with David Rolet. However, Jagnešák was taken to the hospital upon suffering from muscle injury that would rule him out until January.

During the seventh round of 2009–10 Bobsleigh World Cup, Jagnešák teamed up with Marcel Lopuchovský, David Rolet, and Andrej Benda in the four-man bobsleigh category. They finished the lowest position at 29th place.

At the 2010 Winter Olympics, Jagnešák finished 20th in the two-man category with Lopuchovský, becoming the oldest bobsleigh pilot at 40 years old. The pair also teamed up with Martin Tešovič and Petr Narovec the four-man event.

During the 2010–11 Bobsleigh World Cup at the Utah Olympic Park Track, he teamed up with newcomer Juraj Mokráš in the two-man category. They finished eleventh place in the first round and improved to ninth place.

At the 2014 Winter Olympics, Jagnešák teamed up with Petr Nárovec, Lukáš Kožienka, and Juraj Mokráš in the four-man bobsleigh category. They finished 25th place and did not advance to the fourth round.

== Coaching career ==
Jagnešák is also a coach for Viktória Čerňanská at the 2022 Winter Olympics. In February 2022, he was tested positive for COVID-19 and had to spend eight days in quarantine.

== Personal life ==
Jagnešák is married to Zdenka with two children named Barbora and Šimon. The family lives in Bratislava, Slovakia, where he spends his free time cycling.

Jagnešák has been friends with former Italian bobsledder Ivo Ferriani for twenty years.

== Controversy ==
On 2 February 2017, Jagnešák was involved in a scandal where he requested custody, afraid of them not influencing co-accusations. Jagnešák was released from jail the same year on 10 February.

In 2020, Jagnešák was accused of being among 24 people who published false news reports. Markíza confirmed that he was not one of them and apologised to him.
