= Lukáš Kožienka =

Slovak bobsledder

Personal information
- Nationality: Slovak
- Born: 30 June 1989 (age 36) Trstená, Czechoslovakia
- Education: Matej Bel University
- Height: 1.87 m (6 ft 2 in)
- Weight: 95 kg (209 lb)

Sport
- Country: Slovakia
- Sport: Bobsleigh

Lukáš Kožienka (born 30 June 1989) is a Slovak bobsledder and weightlifter.

== Career ==
=== Weightlifting ===
Kožienka was a weightlifter in the European Junior and U23 Weightlifting Championships. He earned 330 points during the 2007 weightlifting tournament in Trenčín on 15 December 2007.

During the 2014 World Weightlifting Championships, he finished 27th place in the category over 105 kg, but did not score points for Slovakia for Olympic qualification.

=== Bobsleigh ===
In 2013, Kožienka was offered to play bobsleigh by Milan Jagnešák. At the 2014 Winter Olympics, they teamed up with Petr Narovec and Juraj Mokráš in the four-man bobsleigh category, finishing 25th place.

At the 2013–14 Bobsleigh World Cup, Kožienka finished tenth place in the two-man bobsleigh category with Milan Jagnešák. The following season, this time Michal Tkáč as his partner, they finished 31st place.

At the 2017–18 Bobsleigh World Cup in Altenberg, Kožienka teamed up with Radek Matoušek, Vladimír Šimík, and Jakub Fendek in the four-man bobsleigh category. They made it to the top ten by finishing tenth place, ranked nine.

At the 2018–19 Bobsleigh World Cup, Kožienka teamed up with Pavol Táborský in the two-man bobsleigh category. They finished 23rd and 28th places, respectively in the first and second round.
