= Rabčice =

Village in Slovakia

- Municipality
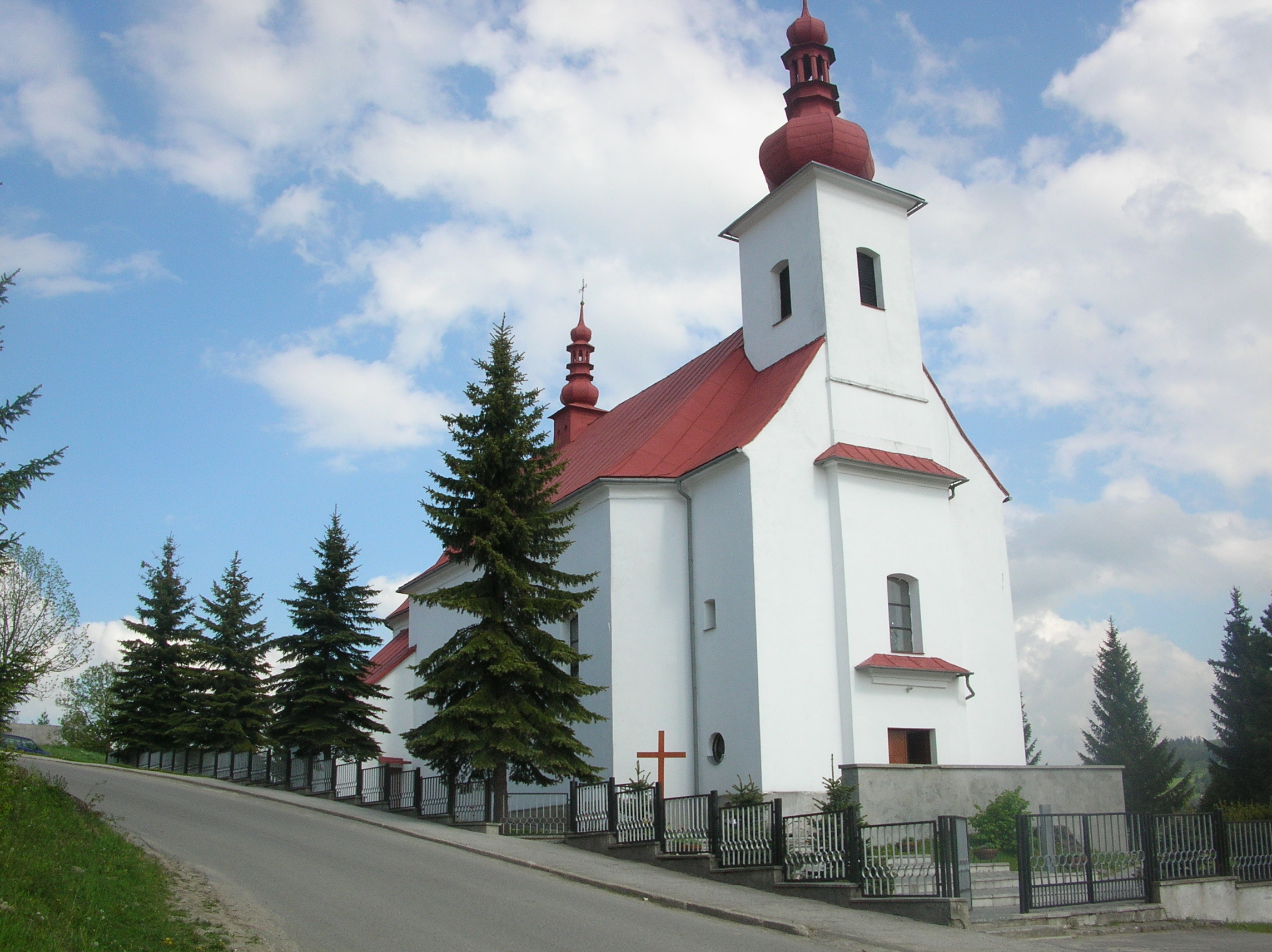
- Baroque church in the village

- Flag

- Location of Rabčice in the Žilina Region Location of Rabčice in Slovakia
- Coordinates: 49.50°N 19.53°E
- Country: Slovakia
- Region: Žilina Region
- District: Námestovo District
- First mentioned: 1616

Area
  - Total: 22.18 km^{2} (8.56 sq mi)
- Elevation: 718 m (2,356 ft)

Population (2025)
  - Total: 2,121
- Time zone: UTC+1 (CET)
  - Summer (DST): UTC+2 (CEST)
- Postal code: 294 5
- Area code: +421 43
- Vehicle registration plate (until 2022): NO
- Website: www.rabcice.sk

Rabčice (Hungarian: Rabcsice) is a village and municipality in Námestovo District in the Žilina Region of northern Slovakia.

== History ==
In historical records the village was first mentioned in 1616.

== Geography ==
The municipality lies at an altitude of 718 metres (2,356 ft) and covers an area of 22.18 km^{2} (8.56 sq mi) (2025).

== Population ==
Population statistic (10 years)
Year	1995	2005	2015	2025
Count	1700	1910	2007	2121
Difference		+12.35%	+5.07%	+5.68%

Population statistic
Year	2024	2025
Count	2101	2121
Difference		+0.95%

It has a population of 2121 people (31 December 2025).

=== Ethnicity ===
Census 2021 (1+ %)
Ethnicity	Number	Fraction
Slovak	1984	98.02%
Not found out	81	4%
Total	2024	

In year 2021 was 2024 people by ethnicity 1984 as Slovak, 81 as Not found out, 6 as Polish, 3 as Czech, 1 as Italian, 1 as Romani, 1 as Russian, 1 as German and 1 as Other.

Note on population: The difference values of population numbers in the table "Population statistic" and in the sections "Ethnicity" & "Religion" is caused by the use of various statistical methods.

=== Religion ===
Census 2021 (1+ %)
Religion	Number	Fraction
Roman Catholic Church	1901	93.92%
None	76	3.75%
Not found out	33	1.63%
Total	2024	

In year 2021 was 2024 people by religion 1901 from Roman Catholic Church, 76 from None, 33 from Not found out, 3 from Christian Congregations in Slovakia, 3 from Ad hoc movements, 2 from Greek Catholic Church, 2 from Buddhism, 1 from Calvinist Church, 1 from Other and not ascertained christian church, 1 from Evangelical Church and 1 from Bahá'i Community.

== Notable people ==
- Milan Jagnešák, Slovak bobsledder
- Milo Urban, Slovak writer
