= Natalie Babonyová =

Canadian ice hockey player (born 1993)

- Born: October 22, 1983 (age 42) Oshawa, Ontario, Canada
- Height: 5 ft 5 in (165 cm)
- Weight: 121 lb (55 kg; 8 st 9 lb)
- Position: Forward
- Golden Blades team: Toronto Crush
- National team: Slovakia
- Playing career: 2009–present

Natalie Babonyová (born October 22, 1983) is a Canadian former ice hockey forward. Babonyova played ice hockey internationally for Slovakia and took part in the 2010 Winter Olympics.

== Early life ==
Babonyová was born and raised in Canada as the daughter of Slovak immigrants from Poprad and Cernina. Her grandfather, Anton Babony, was known as an ice hockey goaltender from Poprad. Her godfather is Poprad native and former NHL player Peter Ihnačák.

== Playing career ==
In 2009, Slovakia competed in the 2009 IIHF Women's World Championship Division I, which was played in Graz, Austria. She assisted Janka Čulíková for Slovakia's sixth goal in a 9–4 win against Norway in her nation's opening game of the tournament. Babonyová was part of the Slovak team that qualified for the top division of the 2011 World Women's Championships.

Babonyová competed for Slovakia at the Mountain Cup international tournament in Europe during December 2009. The tournament was contested in Romanshorn, Switzerland. Babonyová scored two goals as Slovakia finished second behind the Swiss.

In 2010 she played for the Toronto Crush in a women's league in the Greater Toronto Area.

=== Vancouver Winter Games ===
Babonyová played for Slovakia in the 2010 Olympics. Her first Olympic women's ice hockey game came on February 13, 2010, against the team representing the country of her birth, Canada. Slovakia lost the game by an 18-0 mark and Babonyova was penalized for cross checking in the second period. Her first Olympic point came on February 15 in a 6-2 loss to Sweden. She finished the Olympic tournament with an eighth place finish.

== Career statistics ==
=== Winter Olympics ===
Year	GP	Goals	Assists	Points	PIM	+/-
2010 Vancouver Olympics	5	0	1	1	4	-5
