= Cernina =

- Municipality
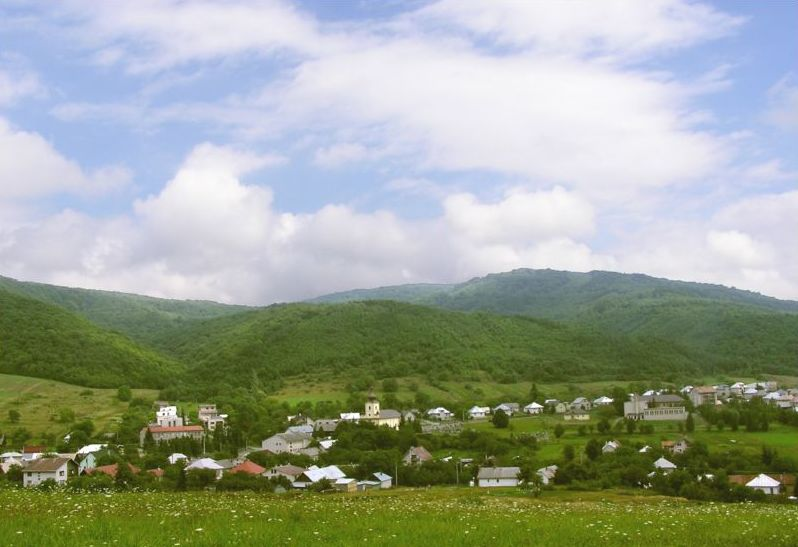

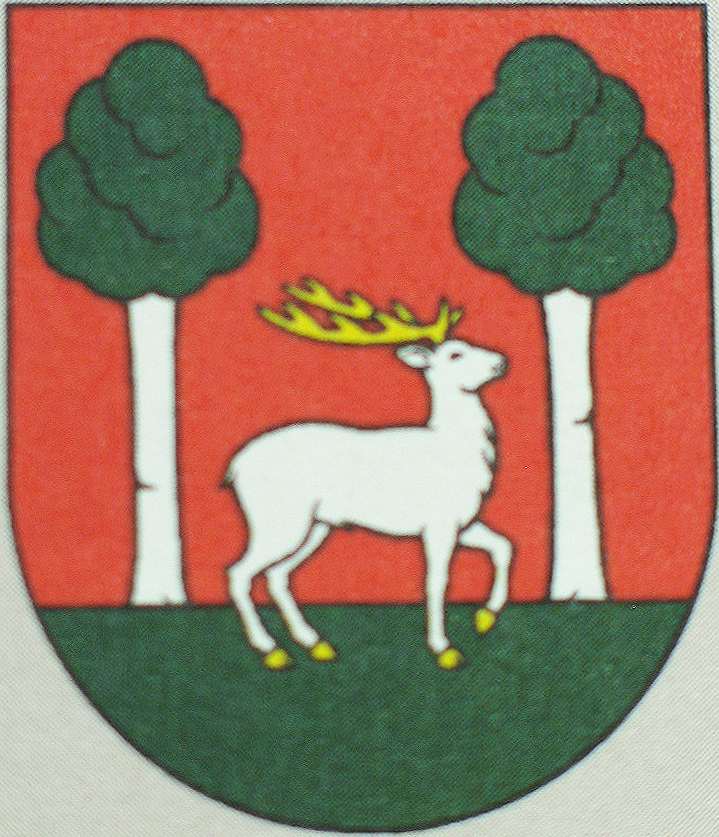
- Flag Coat of arms

- Location of Cernina in the Prešov Region Location of Cernina in Slovakia
- Coordinates: 49.30°N 21.48°E
- Country: Slovakia
- Region: Prešov Region
- District: Svidník District
- First mentioned: 1275

Area
  - Total: 13.12 km^{2} (5.07 sq mi)
- Elevation: 323 m (1,060 ft)

Population (2025)
  - Total: 575
- Time zone: UTC+1 (CET)
  - Summer (DST): UTC+2 (CEST)
- Postal code: 901 6
- Area code: +421 54
- Vehicle registration plate (until 2022): SK
- Website: cernina.sk

Cernina (Hungarian: Felsőcsernye, until 1899: Czernyina; Rusyn: Цернина) is a village and municipality in Svidník District in the Prešov Region of north-eastern Slovakia.

== History ==
In historical records the village was first mentioned in 1275.

== Geography ==
The municipality lies at an altitude of 323 metres (1,060 ft) and covers an area of 13.12 km^{2} (5.07 sq mi) (2025).

== Population ==
Population statistic (10 years)
Year	1995	2005	2015	2025
Count	611	593	590	575
Difference		−2.94%	−0.50%	−2.54%

Population statistic
Year	2024	2025
Count	573	575
Difference		+0.34%

It has a population of 575 people (31 December 2025).

=== Ethnicity ===
Census 2021 (1+ %)
Ethnicity	Number	Fraction
Slovak	514	88.46%
Rusyn	211	36.31%
Romani	51	8.77%
Not found out	12	2.06%
Total	581	

In year 2021 was 581 people by ethnicity 514 as Slovak, 211 as Rusyn, 51 as Romani, 12 as Not found out, 5 as Ukrainian, 2 as Russian, 2 as Moravian and 1 as Czech.

Note on population: The difference values of population numbers in the table "Population statistic" and in the sections "Ethnicity" & "Religion" is caused by the use of various statistical methods.

=== Religion ===
Census 2021 (1+ %)
Religion	Number	Fraction
Greek Catholic Church	433	74.53%
Roman Catholic Church	57	9.81%
None	38	6.54%
Eastern Orthodox Church	21	3.61%
Jehovah's Witnesses	18	3.1%
Total	581	

In year 2021 was 581 people by religion 433 from Greek Catholic Church, 57 from Roman Catholic Church, 38 from None, 21 from Eastern Orthodox Church, 18 from Jehovah's Witnesses, 5 from Not found out, 3 from Paganism and natural spirituality, 2 from Apostolic Church, 1 from Evangelical Church, 1 from Church of the Brethren, 1 from Buddhism and 1 from Ad hoc movements.

== Genealogical resources ==
The records for genealogical research are available at the state archive "Statny Archiv in Presov, Slovakia"

- Roman Catholic church records (births/marriages/deaths): 1750-1896 (parish B)
- Greek Catholic church records (births/marriages/deaths): 1752-1895 (parish A)

== See also ==
- List of municipalities and towns in Slovakia
