= Vatra (Slovak magazine) =

Vatra was a Slovak language magazine published monthly after the Second World War by Slovak emigrants in Great Britain between 1948 and 1952. Originally the paper of Slovak Youth in Great Britain, Vatra brought its readers as much news from the home country as it could gather, as well as announcements of activities by various groups of countrymen in England and elsewhere in exile. All 1948 - 1952 issues are held in the British Library. Today's Vatra is published on the Internet with articles mainly on Slovak history.
