= Petr Narovec =

Slovak bobsledder

Petr Narovec (born 15 April 1977) is a bobsledder. Born in the Czech Republic, he has since been a naturalised citizen of Slovakia.

== Career ==
Narovec finished 20th place in the four-man bobsleigh category at the 2009–10 Bobsleigh World Cup in Lake Placid, New York. He also finished 20th place at the 2010 Winter Olympics in the two-man category whilst crashing out in the four-man category.
